= Asian Americans in arts and entertainment =

Asian Americans have been involved in the U.S. entertainment industry since the 19th century, when Afong Moy started a series of shows that evolved into essentially one-woman shows. In the mid-19th century, Chang and Eng Bunker (the original Siamese Twins) became naturalized citizens and were successful performers in the United States. Sadakichi Hartman, originally from Japan, was a successful playwright in the 1890s. Acting roles in television, film, and theater were relatively few, and many available roles were for narrow, stereotypical characters. Early Asian American actors such as Sessue Hayakawa, Anna May Wong, and Bruce Lee encountered a movie-making culture and industry that wanted to cast them as caricatures. Some, like actress Merle Oberon, hid their ethnicity to avoid discrimination by Hollywood's racist laws.

In the 21st Century, Asian Americans are gained greater visibility in mainstream U.S. film, television, music, and digital media.

Digital platforms such as YouTube have provided new visibility for some Asian American comedians, musicians, and filmmakers. Notable YouTubers include comedians such as Ryan Higa and Kevin Wu; entertainers such as Dan Chan and Christine Gambito; musicians such as MC Jin, Far East Movement, Sam Tsui, David Choi, and Kina Grannis; and the filmmaking group Wong Fu Productions. These entertainers have gained notable followings, mainly with young Asian American students, through solo and collaborative videos, short films and tours.

Several Asian American fashion designers have risen to prominence in the world of fashion, such as Vera Wang, Anna Sui, and Monique Lhuillier. Sandy Liang and her fashion label brand has garnered attention especially in New York City for pieces that exude and revolutionize femininity and romance.

In literature, Asian American authors have received recognition in both fiction and nonfiction. Some include Linda Sue Park's A Single Shard, Cynthia Kadohata's Kira-Kira, Erin Entrada Kelly's Hello, Universe, and Tae Keller's When You Trap a Tiger receiving Newbery Medals. Maxine Hong Kingston and Bharati Mukherjee won National Book Critics Circle Awards in 1976 and 1988 for their respective works The Woman Warrior and The Middleman and Other Stories.

Additionally, other Asian American music artists have broken out into mainstream audiences beyond the Asian American community. Popular artists and performers include those such as Bruno Mars, Darren Criss, Awkwafina, Jhené Aiko, Olivia Rodrigo, Conan Gray, and The Slants.

Asians have been influential in fine arts as both subjects and artists, despite Asian American artwork being rather underrepresented in many art collections and museums. Some recognized artists include Sueo Serisawa, David Choe, Isamu Noguchi, and George Tsutakawa. Notable architects include Minoru Yamasaki (World Trade Center), Maya Lin (Vietnam Veterans Memorial), and Fazlur Rahman Khan (John Hancock Center and the Willis Tower). Asian American graphic artists such as Larry Hama (Marvel Comics' G.I. Joe series) and Jim Lee (Batman: Hush, Superman: For Tomorrow, Fantastic Four, X-Men) have also been influential in the comic book industry.

== Award (Golden Globe and Academy Awards) ==
Actor/actress	Award	Category of the award	Project	Year	Notes
Miyoshi Umeki	Academy	Best Supporting Actress	Sayonara	1958	1st East Asian-American actress and Japan born actress to win an Oscar
Richard Chew	Academy	Film Editing	Star Wars: A New Hope	1978	1st Asian-American to win a film editing Oscar
Haing Ngor	Academy	Best Supporting Actor	The Killing Fields	1985	1st East Asian-American actor to win an Oscar
Aziz Ansari	Golden Globe	Best Actor in Television Comedy	Master of None	2018	1st Asian-American actor to win a Golden Globe for acting in television
Ke Huy Quan	Academy/ Golden Globe	Best Supporting Actor	Everything Everywhere All at Once	2023	1st Asian-American actor to win an Oscar as well as a Golden Globe
Ali Wong	Golden Globe	Best Actress	Beef	2024	1st Asian-American actor to win a Golden Globe in a Limited Series
Ali Wong	Golden Globe	Best Performance in Stand-Up Comedy on Television	Single Lady	2025	2nd person to win the award

== 19th century ==
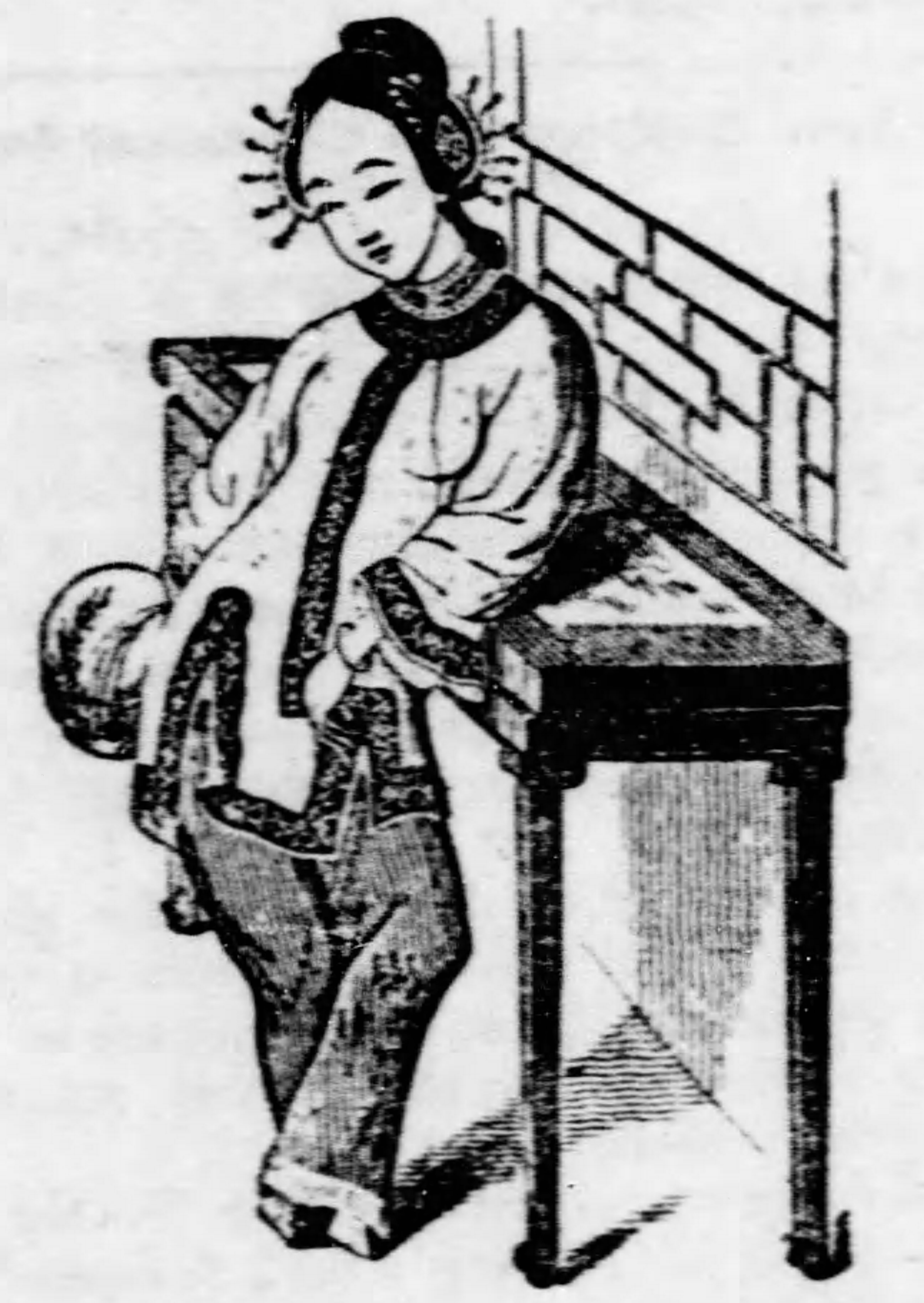
Afong Moy depicted in the Pittsburgh Gazette, Thursday, May 19, 1836

In 1834, Afong Moy, the first recorded Chinese woman to arrive in the United States, began appearing in public exhibition that combined performance with the display of Chinese material culture and language. Her performances would later evolve into more one-woman shows only. She would later go onto to meet U.S. President Andrew Jackson. She was the first Chinese person to meet a U.S. president. Her performances were recreated for the 2022 theatrical work: The Chinese Lady, at the Public Theater in New York City, which was written by Lloyd Suh, directed by Ralph B. Peña, and co-produced by the Ma-Yi Theatre Company. Moy was also the subject of the 2019 book named, The Chinese Lady: Afong May in Early America by curator emeritus at the National Museum of American History, Nancy E. Davis.

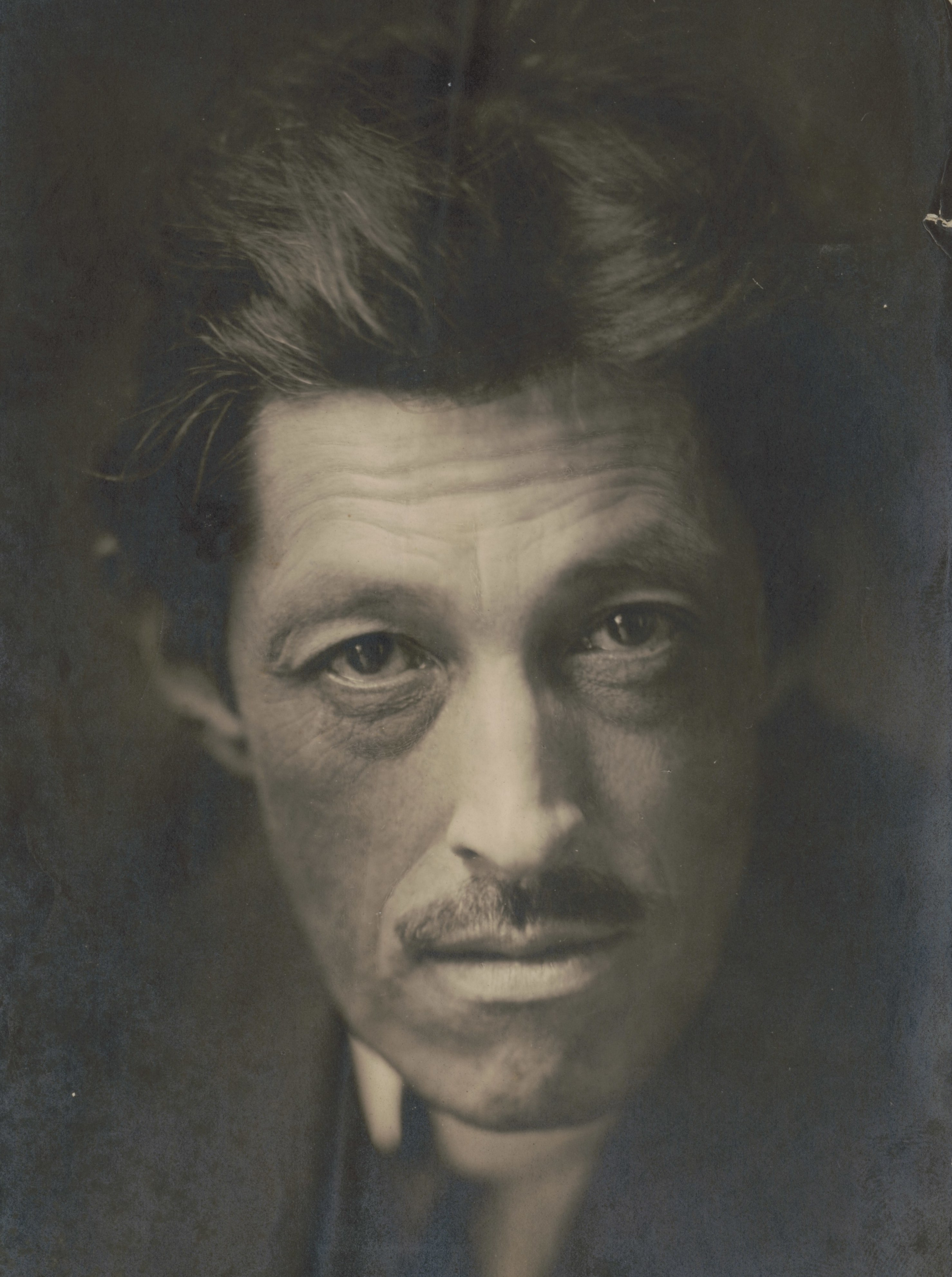
Sadakichi Hartmann, 1913

Sadakichi Hartman, was born in Nagasaki Prefecture, Japan in 1867. His mother, Osada Harman, was also from Japan. He migrated to the United States, arriving in Philadelphia in 1882. He became active as a playwright in the 1890s. Between 1890 and 1900, he wrote the following controversial plays classified as Symbolist theatrical works:

- Christ: A Dramatic Poem in Three Acts (1893)
- Buddha: A Drama in Twelve Scenes (1897)

Along with plays, he wrote a collection of short stories in Schopenhauer in the Air: Seven Stories (1899).

He was later an influential art critic and, in 1901, he authored the two volume History of American Art in 1901. At the dawn of the 20th century, he was an occasional performer in 1905 at the Miner's Theater in New York City.

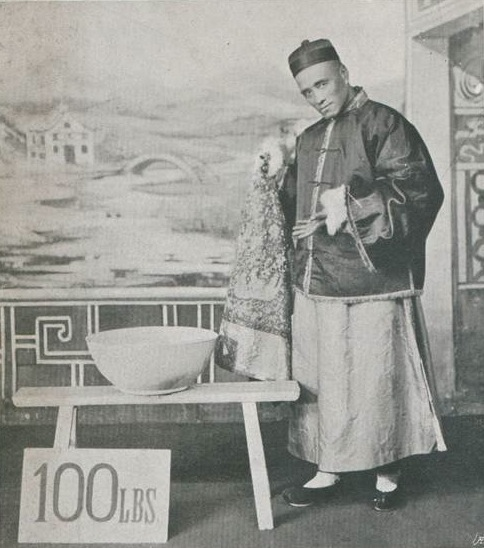
Ching Ling Foo at the 1898 Trans-Mississippi and International Exposition in Omaha, Nebraska

Magician Chung Ling Foo brought his show from China to the 1898 Trans-Mississippi International Exposition in Omaha, Nebraska. His shows were at the Chinese Village of the exposition. He did a following show in 1899 at the same village.

Chang and Eng Bunker had a long career as public performers in the United States. Cheng and Eng Bunker were conjoined twins who become widely known in the 19th century as the "Siamese Twins." They were born in 1811 in a village sixty miles from Bangkok. Cheng and Eng were conjoined at the chest at birth, thus starting their career as a human spectacle. They were gawked at in their own country before coming to America at age eighteen. Touring city to city, they were well received, giving performances that featured their unique physiognomy and also highlighted their distinctive wit and innate intelligence. After ten years, at the age of twenty-eight, Chang and Eng retired and decided to settle down in Wilkes County in western North Carolina where they also adopted the surname "Bunker." In North Carolina, they married sisters Sarah Anne and Adelaide Yates and began their lives as southern gentlemen by managing their individual households, plantations, and slaves. The former Siamese Twins from the countryside outside of Bangkok became the wealthiest men in the county and the patriarchs of two large families (between the two, there were twenty-one children). When need be, they returned to touring in order to accumulate more funds. In 1874, both Chang and Eng died at age sixty-two.

Despite few Asian/Asian-American entertainers in the 19th century, many entertainment platforms attempt to depict accurate occurrences in 19th-century Asia, such as Dunhuang Performative Arts company and their performances exhibiting the journey of the Silk Road in "Dunhuang, My Dreamland." The show portrays Daoist priest Wang Yuanlu in accurate garb and performed by an appropriate actor, Chen Yizong. The playwright sets the stage at the Dunhuang Magao Caves which was historically important for travelers along the Silk Road, especially Buddhist monks from India and central Asia while on their journey to Chang'an (now Xi'an). Among meditations, the caves were used to reference the monastery's texts and records.

== Actor/actress transitions from film to television and vice versa ==
Name	From	To	Examples
Anna May Wong	Film	Television	From silent films to The Gallery of Madame Liu-Tsong (1951)
Phillip Ahn	Film	Television	From films in the 1930s to Kung Fu (1972)
Myoshi Umeki	Film	Television	From films in the 1950s (including Sayonara, for which she received an Academy Award) to The Courtship of Eddie's Father (1969–1972)
France Nuyen	Film	Television	From films in the 1950s to St. Elsewhere (1986–1988)
Bruce Lee	Television Film	Film Television	From The Green Hornet to film. From films made in Hong Kong (1940s) to US television (1960s).
George Takei	Film	Television	From film in the late 1950s to cast member of Star Trek (1966–1969).
Pat Morita	Television	Film	From Happy Days (1970s) to The Karate Kid (1980s)
Ming-Na Wen	Film	Television	From Joy Luck Club (1993) to Dr.Jing-Mei "Deb" Chen on ER from (1994–1995) and (1999–2004)

== Film ==
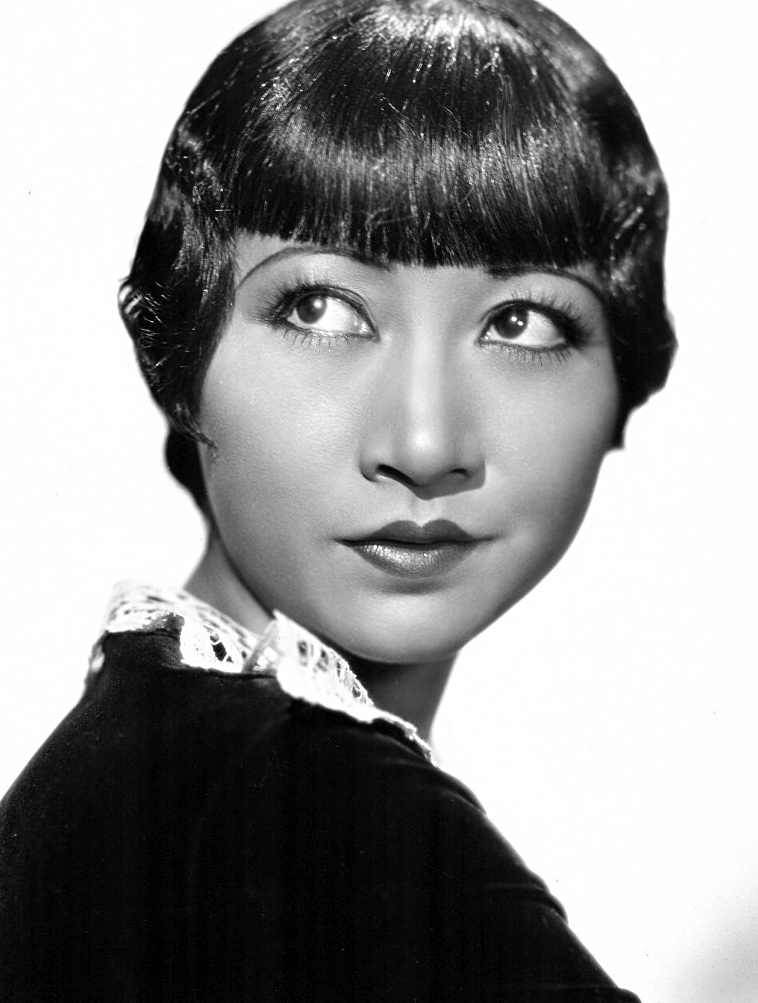
Anna May Wong in a Paramount Pictures publicity photo, circa 1935

=== Film actors / actresses ===
==== 1920s ====
===== Anna May Wong =====
Anna May Wong was the first Asian American to become an international acting star. She became a fashion icon during the silent film era, beginning with her success in the film The Toll of the Sea (1922), the first color feature to be made in Hollywood. During her career she sought roles that portrayed Chinese and Asian Americans in a positive light, but these films never became famous except for a select few, such as Daughter of Shanghai (1937).

In 1935, Wong wanted to be cast in the film adaptation of The Good Earth, but lost the role to white actress Luise Rainer. Due to anti-miscegenation laws, producers did not even consider Wong to play the role, even when she publicly explained her desire for the role. She found out that "she was never considered because the producers wanted a white male actor for the Chinese lead, and anti-miscegenation laws prevented a nonwhite woman to be cast opposite a white man."

Frustrated by being stereotyped and typecast during her career in the United States, she moved to Europe, where she appeared in many plays and films, most notably the British film Piccadilly (1929).

She later returned to the United States in an ironic twist, at a time when American studios were searching Europe for fresh new talent, despite the fact that she was an American. She returned with promises of leading roles, but these did not come about. She eventually stopped acting in professional films, and turned to stage, cabaret, B movies, and anti-Japanese propaganda films such as Bombs Over Burma (1943) due to her advocacy against the Japanese aggression in China. She was set to make her comeback with the film Flower Drum Song (1961), but was unable to, due to failing health. Despite a prolific career, Wong's only film to have ever been a truly big success was Shanghai Express (1932). For her later work in television, see Television 1950s.

On February 8, 1960, Wong became the first Asian American actress to receive a star on the Hollywood Walk of Fame.

===== Sessue Hayakawa =====
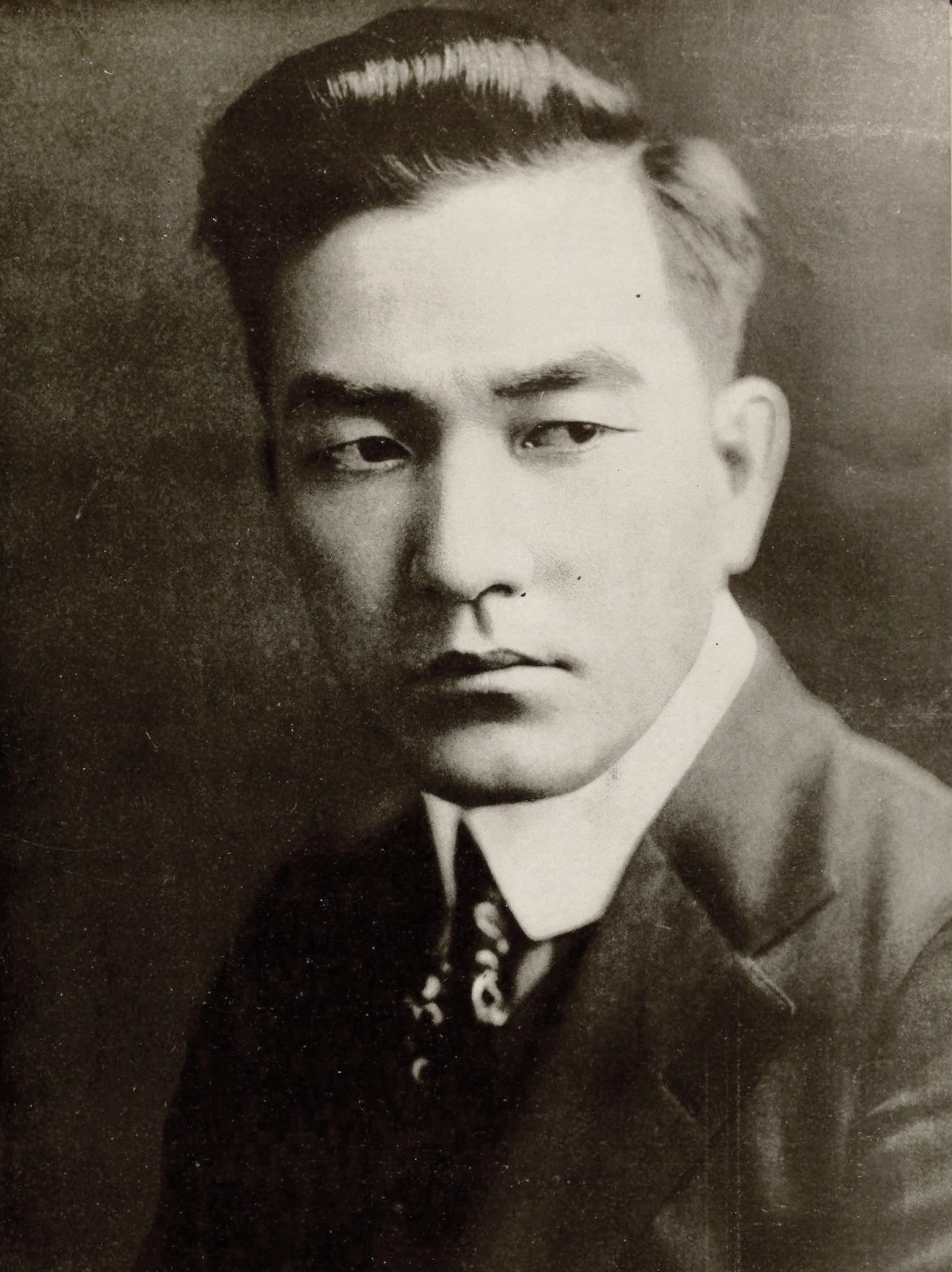
Sessue Hayakawa in 1918

Sessue Hayakawa was the first and one of the few Asian American/Asian actors to find stardom in the United States and Europe, and was also the first leading Asian male actor in the United States. He became the first male sex symbol of Hollywood long before and the precursor to Rudolph Valentino. His fame rivaled that of Douglas Fairbanks and Charlie Chaplin.

Hayakawa's career began during the silent film era, leading into sound pictures in his later life. He became a film actor in a somewhat reluctant and accidental manner when the famous producer Thomas Ince saw his theater play The Typhoon and wanted to turn it into a silent film. When it was released, the film was an instant hit. With rising stardom, he was eventually offered a film contract by Famous Players–Lasky (now Paramount Pictures).

His second film with the production company, The Cheat (1915), was a success and made him a romantic hit with U.S. female audiences. He became a leading man of romance films, considered a heartthrob and a sex symbol; many actresses wanted to work with him in films, in which he was often cast as the exotic male Asian lover whom women desired.

After years of being typecast as a villain and exotic Asian lover that white women could not have, Hayakawa decided to start his own production company, where he eventually made 23 films; he produced, starred in, and directed them, and contributed to their design, writing and editing. His films also influenced the way the United States viewed Asians.

He personally chose American actress Marin Sais to appear opposite him in his films such as The City of Dim Faces and His Birthright. Hayakawa's collaboration with Sais ended with the film Bonds of Honor (1919).

In 1919, Hayakawa made what is generally considered one of his best films, The Dragon Painter.

After some bad business, he left the United States and for the next 15 years he worked in Europe and Japan, where he made many popular films and plays, such as the film The Great Prince Shan, and the play Samurai, which he performed for the king and queen of the United Kingdom at that time, King George V and Queen Mary, and a stage play version of The Three Musketeers.

His fame in France came from France's fascination with anything Asian. In the 1930s, with the rise of Talkies and growing anti-Japanese sentiment due to World War II. During the war, he tried to perform in Europe but eventually became trapped by the Germans, and for years was not able to work as an actor until Humphrey Bogart tracked him and down and offered him a role in his film Tokyo Joe (1949), which became a hit. Afterwards, he did another successful film, Three Came Home (1950).

After the war, Hayakawa's image in films was as the honorable villain, as which he became typecast. He starred in what is considered to be the most famous film of his career, The Bridge on the River Kwai (1957), for which he was nominated for both an Academy Award and Golden Globe Award.

On February 8, 1960, in a joint ceremony with Anna May Wong, Hayakawa became the first Asian American actor to receive a star on the Hollywood Walk of Fame.

==== 1930s ====
===== Merle Oberon and Philip Ahn =====
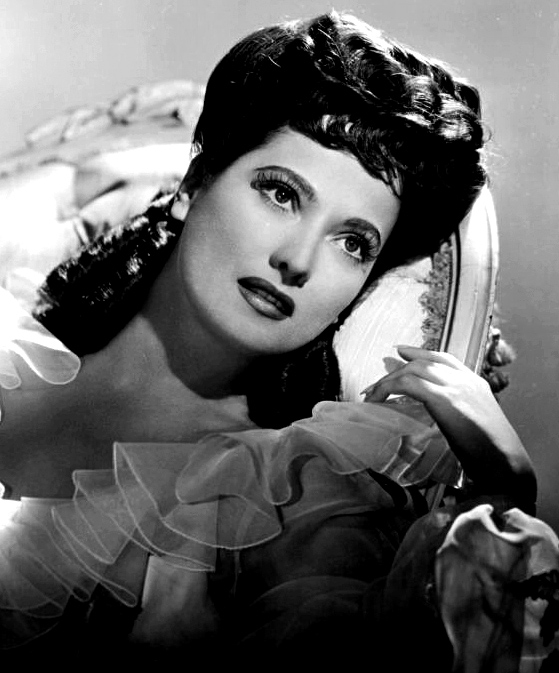
Merle Oberon in 1943

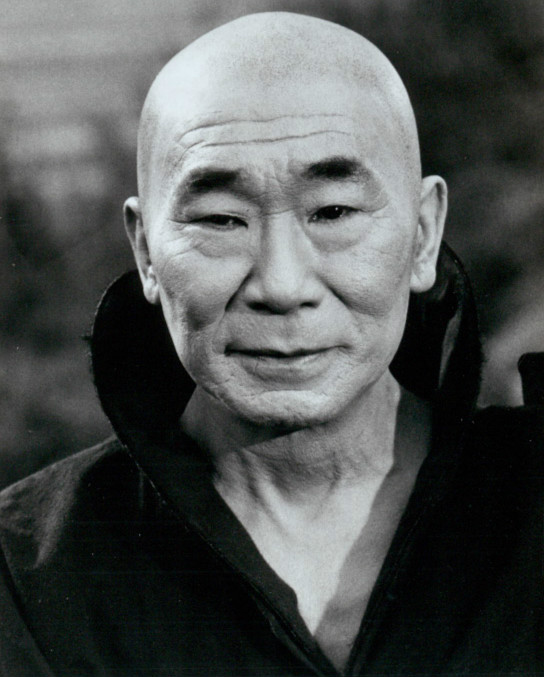
Phillip Ahn as Master Kan on the television series Kung Fu (1972–1975)

Merle Oberon, an actress of Old Hollywood, starred in many successful films, and was nominated for an Oscar for Best Actress for the film The Dark Angel (1935). She is most renowned for her performance in the film version of Wuthering Heights (1939). In the United Kingdom, she starred in the successful films The Private Life of Henry VIII (1933) and The Scarlet Pimpernel (1934). Despite her success as an actress, Oberon hid her Indian heritage due to her history of discrimination growing up. She invented a fake story of the origin of her birth and early life.

Philip Ahn's first film was A Scream in the Night (1934). He portrayed the character Master Kan in the television series Kung Fu (1972–1975). He was the first Korean American film actor to receive a star on the Hollywood Walk of Fame.

==== 1950s ====
===== Miyoshi Umeki, Frances Nuyen, and James Shigeta =====
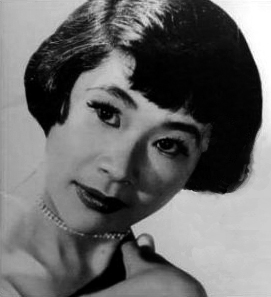
1957 Academy Award winner Miyoshi Umeki

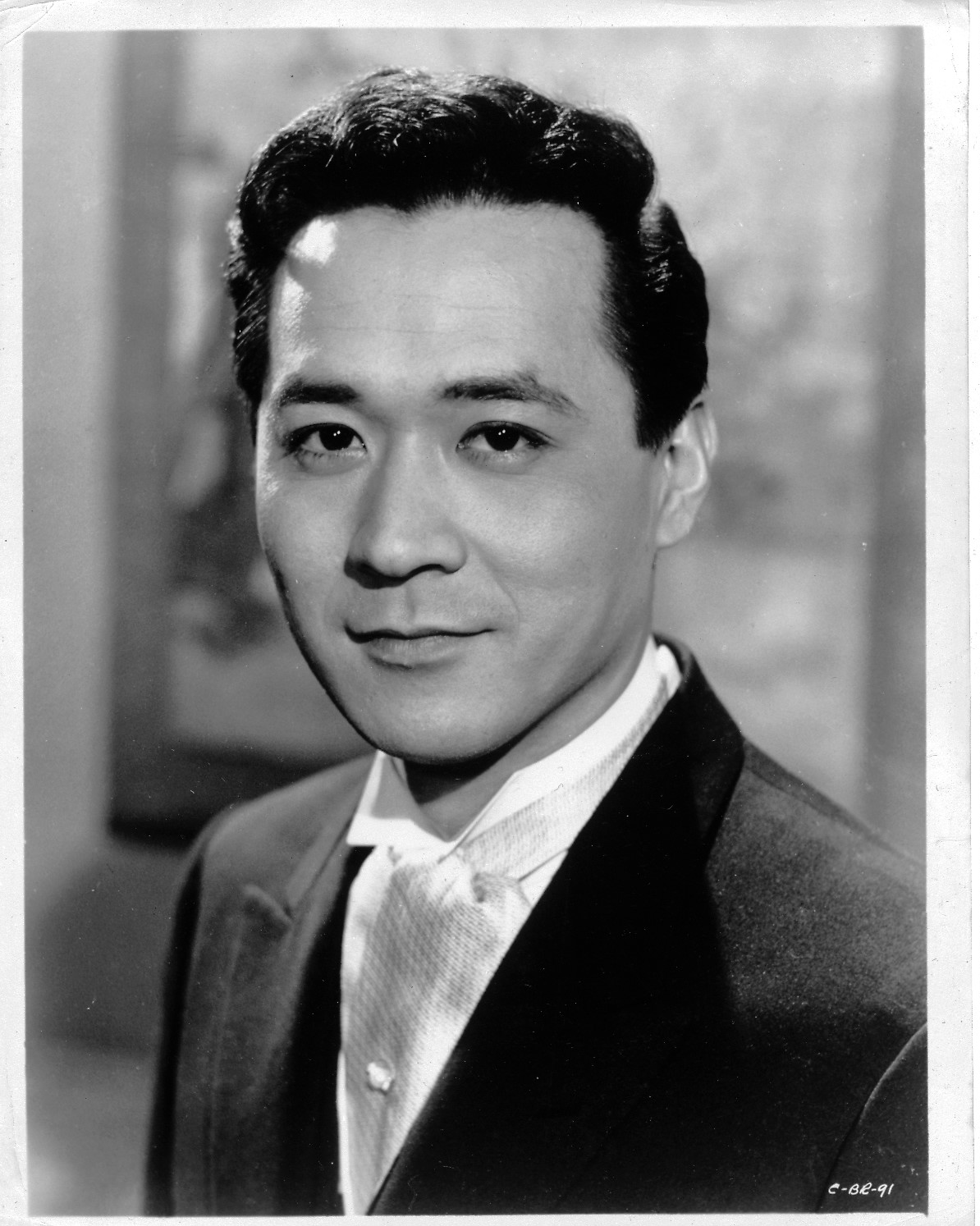
James Shigeta (1961)

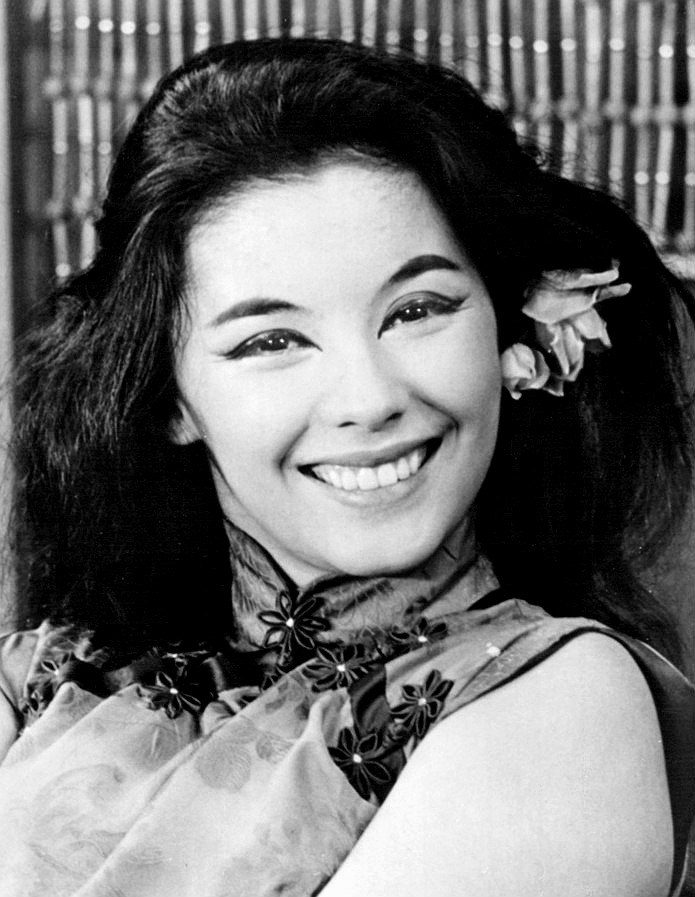
France Nuyen (1958)

Miyoshi Umeki won the Academy Award for Best Supporting Actress in for Sayonara (1957).

Following the legacy of Sessue Hayakawa, James Shigeta often in his early career in the late 1950s–1960s played romantic male lead roles, even interracial ones, which as an actor of Asian descent during his time were almost non-existent.

France Nguyễn Vân Nga (later changed to France Nuyen) portrayed Liat in the 1958 film South Pacific. In the same year, she was in The World of Suzie Wong on Broadway with William Shatner. She was later cast to reprise her role of Suzie Wong in the 1960 film The World of Suzie Wong, but was later replaced by Nancy Kwan. Nuyen played Dr. Paulette Kiem in the television series St. Elsewhere (1986–1988).

==== 1960s–1970s ====
===== Bruce Lee =====
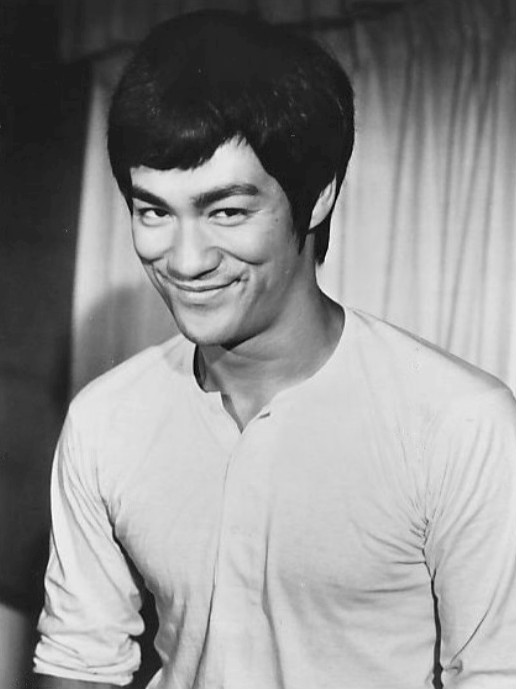
Bruce Lee in 1973

Bruce Lee was the action director in The Wrecking Crew (1968) and a main character in the 1960 television series The Green Hornet. He was in a variety of films up to Enter the Dragon (1973), one of the highest-grossing films of the 1970s, with a US gross of $100 million.

However, he abandoned Hollywood in the early 1970s and achieved worldwide fame in Hong Kong. Lee has made a substantial impact with martial arts and entertainment. He claimed to not fit into the established martial arts scene in San Francisco when he arrived in 1959. He encountered a diverse group of martial artists within the Bay Area who held a similar philosophy. Lee signed a two-film contract, eventually bringing his family over to Hong Kong as well. Towards the end of 1972, he was a major movie star in Asia.

===== Female character roles =====
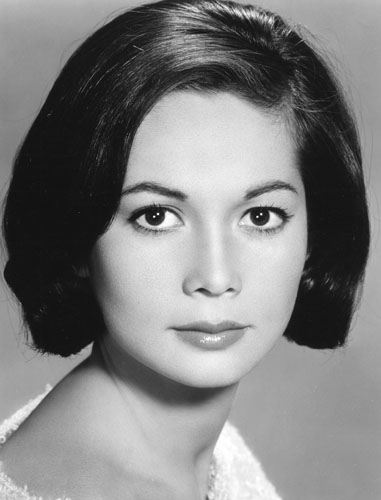
Nancy Kwan, circa 1964

Nai Bonet, originally from Vietnam, was a cast member of John Goldfarg, Please Come Home! (1965). She played a variety of characters in films until 1980.

From the 1960s to the 1970s, Midori Arimoto portrayed a variety of characters in films ranging from Krakatoa, East of Java (1968) to Kill the Golden Goose (1977).

Nancy Kwan, after the release of her film The World of Suzie Wong (1960), became a popular film actress in the 1960s.

===== 1979 and the 1970s box office =====
Star Trek: The Motion Picture (1979) featured George Takei and Persis Khambatta, originally from India, as crew members of the USS Enterprise. Also in 1979, Toshiro Sugo played the villain's henchman in the 007 film Moonraker. Star Trek: The Motion Picture, Moonraker, and Enter the Dragon (1973) featuring Bruce Lee, are among the top 30 highest-grossing films of the 1970s, with Enter the Dragon being among the top 10.

==== 1980s–2000s ====
===== Sho Kosugi =====
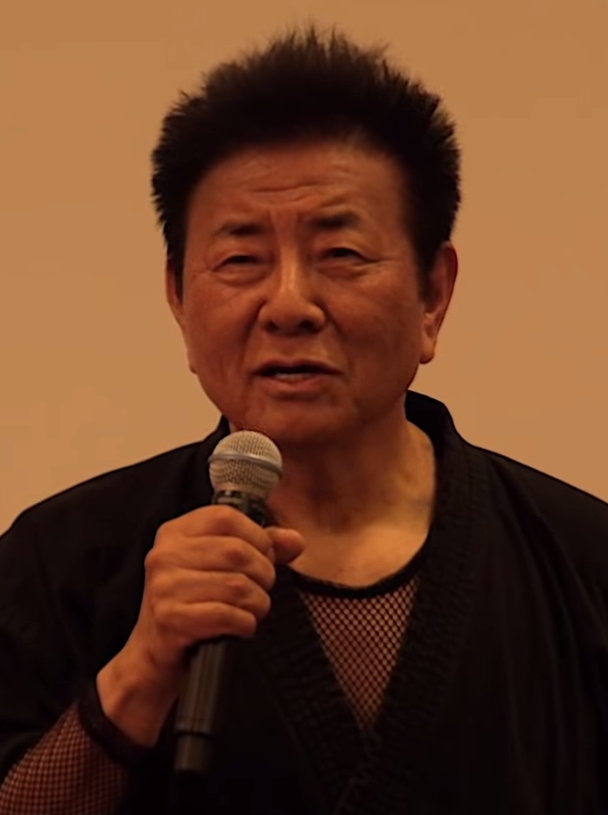
Sho Kosugi in 2018

Sho Kosugi achieved stardom in the United States and internationally during the 1980s. After thrilling audiences as the third lead and villain in Enter the Ninja (1981), he was given the solo lead starring role as the hero in the follow-up film Revenge of the Ninja (1983).

Like Bruce Lee did with Kung Fu in the 1970s, Kosugi ignited a worldwide Ninja craze in the 1980s with his films. Similar to the Bruceploitation phenomenon that followed Lee's death, many copy-cat ninja films were made following the worldwide popularity of Sho's early ninja films. A number of films produced in Hong Kong and Taiwan even used Sho's image on their posters and home video covers, despite the fact that Kosugi was not involved in these productions. Kosugi's image as a ninja was used, and continues to be used, on unsanctioned T-shirts, posters, fans, collectibles, and video game covers like The Last Ninja.

Following his starring role in Revenge of the Ninja, he was the lead star in six more American films: Ninja III: The Domination (1984), 9 Deaths of the Ninja (1985), Pray For Death (1985), Rage of Honor (1987), Black Eagle (1988), and Journey of Honor (1991), which he also produced and co-wrote. He also received "special appearance" credit in the American films Aloha Summer (1988) and Blind Fury (1989), and was the third lead in the Japanese film Kyokuto Kuroshakai (1993). He co-starred in the NBC TV series The Master, where he played the lead villain and also doubled for actor Lee Van Cleef in most of the fight scenes.

Kosugi also served as fight choreographer, ninja technical advisor, and stunt coordinator on many of his projects. He directed two V-cinema movies in Japan starring his son Kane Kosugi. While working in Japan, Kosugi had a high-profile role in the prestigious long-running NHK Taiga Drama TV series Ryūkyū no Kaze (Dragon Spirit) (1993), and was a special guest star in two episodes of the 1994–1995 TV series Ninja Sentai Kakuranger, part of the long running Super Sentai series.

After 16 years off the silver screen, Kosugi returned as the lead villain in Ninja Assassin (2009), produced by Hollywood heavyweights the Wachowskis, Joel Silver and Grant Hill, and directed by James McTeigue: "If you've ever watched any ninja films from the 1980s, you know that Sho Kosugi is the ninja; he is the man," said McTeigue.

===== Mako Iwamatsu, Pat Morita, and Lou Diamond Phillips =====
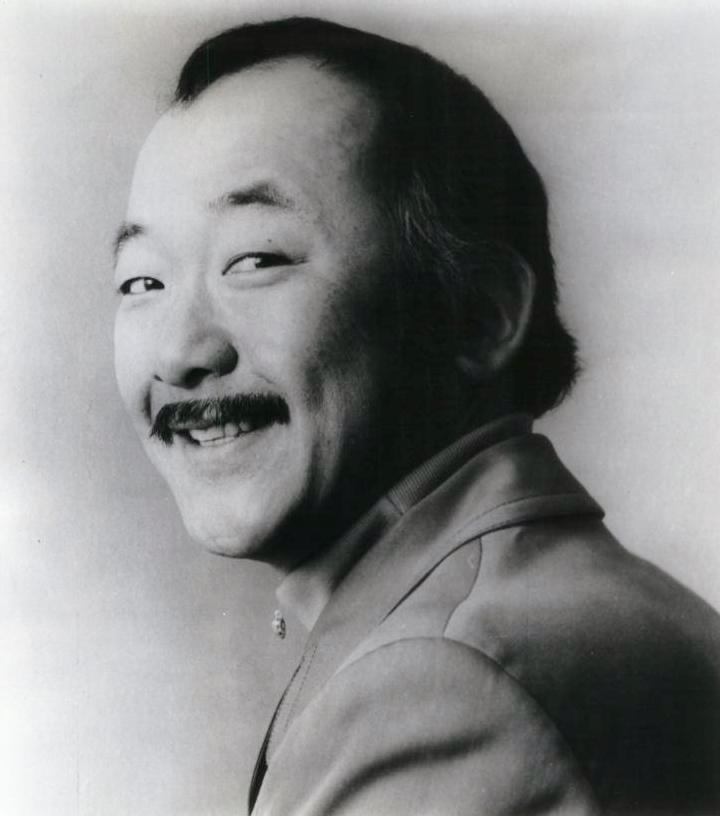
Pat Morita in 1971

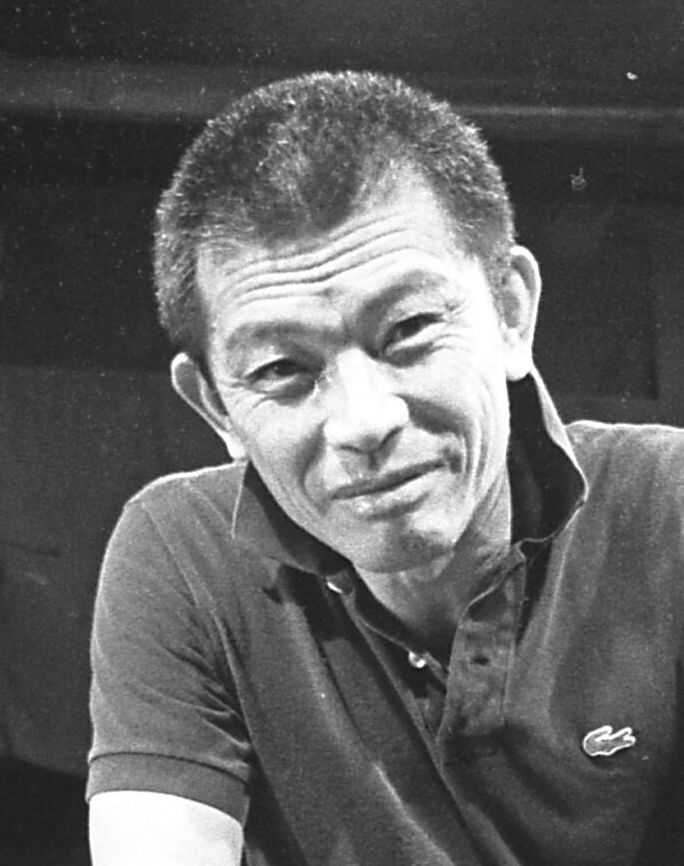
Mako Iwamatsu (Mako), 1986

Mako Iwamatsu was nominated for the Academy Award for Best Supporting Actor for The Sand Pebbles (1966). He also starred in Conan the Barbarian (1982) and its sequel Conan the Destroyer (1984), Tucker: The Man and His Dream (1988), Seven Years in Tibet (1997), The Bird People in China (1998) and Pearl Harbor (2001).

Pat Morita was nominated for the Academy Award for Best Supporting Actor for the The Karate Kid (1984), and Haing Ngor won the Academy Award for Best Supporting Actor for The Killing Fields (1984).

Lou Diamond Phillips had leading roles in several motion pictures, including La Bamba (1987), Stand and Deliver (1988), Young Guns (1988) and Che (2008).

==== The 2000s ====
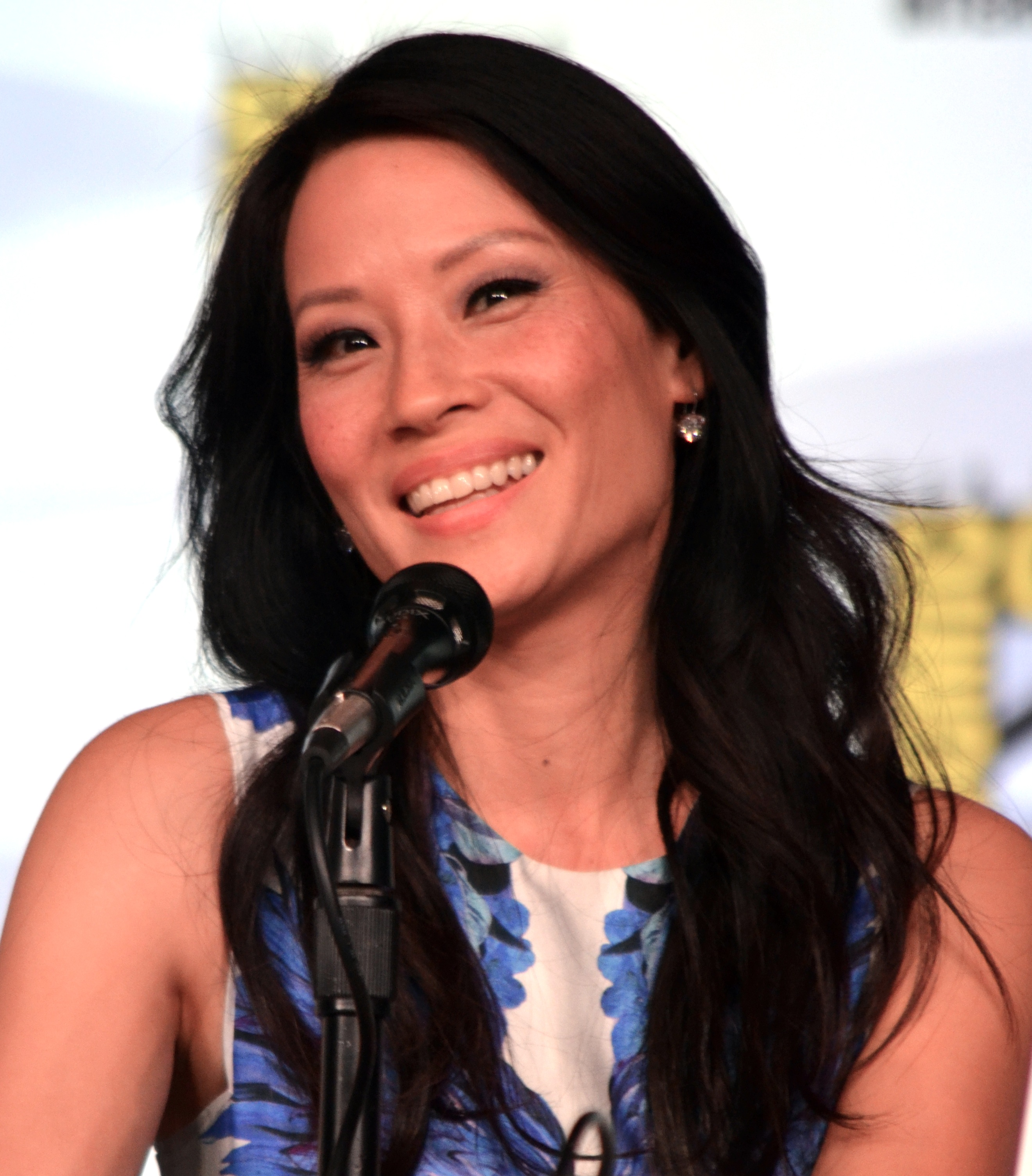
Lucy Liu, television and film actress

Lucy Liu was one of the lead actresses in the Charlie's Angels movies. She appeared in Rob Marshall's Chicago (2002) and Quentin Tarentino's Kill Bill: Volume 1 (2003), the latter for which she was paid $5.5 million. She was the first Asian American woman to host Saturday Night Live, in 2000. She also had hit releases with Kung Fu Panda (2008) and its sequel, Kung Fu Panda 2 (2011).

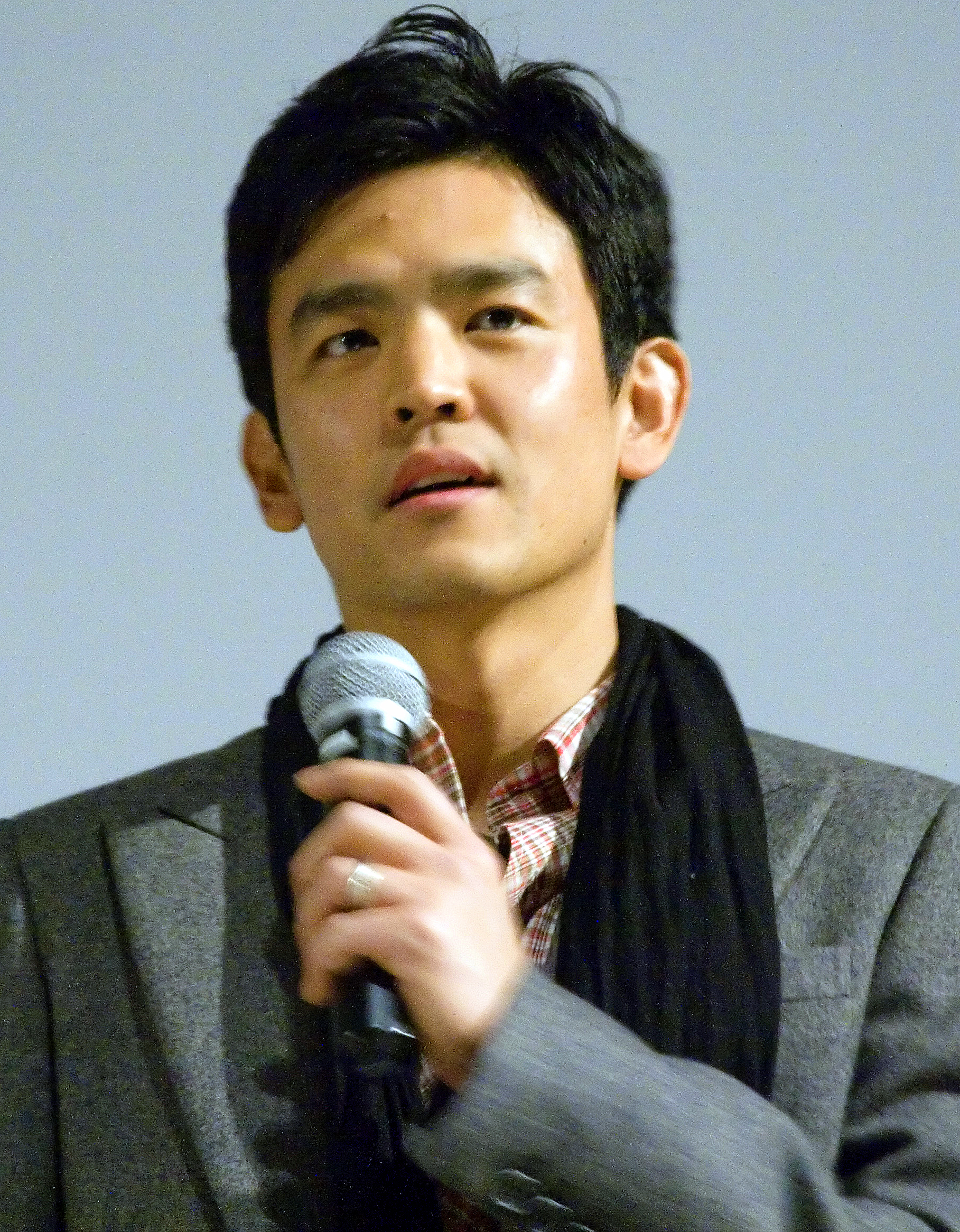
John Cho, television and film actor

John Cho, a Korean-born American actor, portrayed Hikaru Sulu in the Star Trek reboot. He appeared in the first American Pie series and the Harold & Kumar series, along with Indian American actor Kal Penn.

Penn also starred in The Namesake, and taught a course and seminar on images of Asian Americans in the media at the University of Pennsylvania.

Cho also starred in Searching, the first mainstream Hollywood thriller headlined by an Asian-American actor.

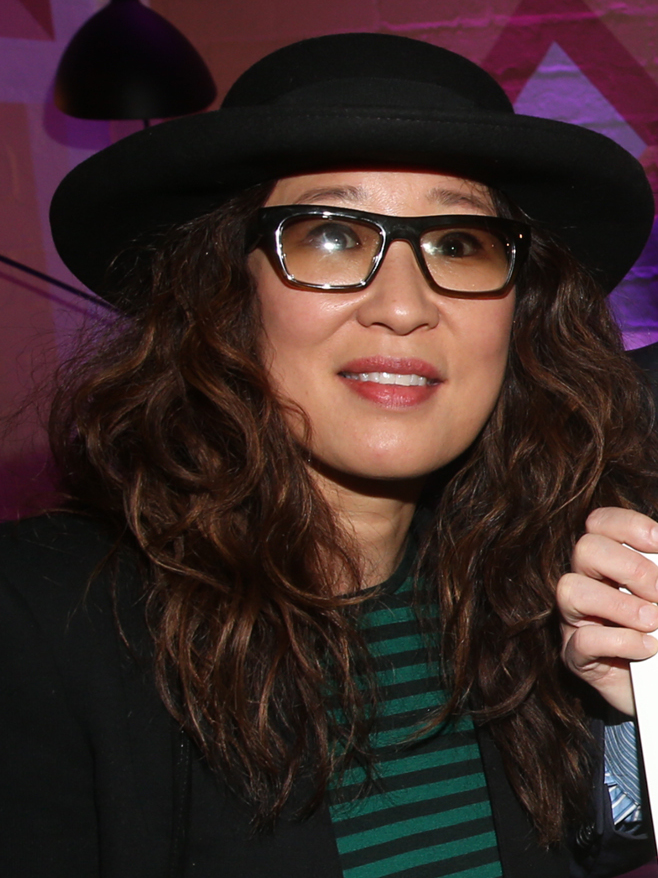
Sandra Oh, television and film actor

Sandra Oh, a Canadian-American actress of Korean descent, has been a mainstay in film for well over two decades, having portrayed many scene-stealing supporting characters in films such as Double Happiness, Bean, Last Night, The Princess Diaries, Under the Tuscan Sun, Sideways, Hard Candy, Rabbit Hole, Catfight, and Meditation Park.

Making waves in the entertainment industry, Korean-born, US-raised actor Ki Hong Lee rose to international fame as Minho in the film adaptation of James Dashner's book series The Maze Runner.

Ming-Na Wen, Jordan Nagai, and Ryan Potter starred in highly impacting voice roles in the animated Disney and Pixar films Mulan (1998), Up (2009), and Big Hero 6 (2014).

Maggie Q, after achieving fame in Hong Kong, has since starred in big budget and big box office films Mission: Impossible III (2006) and Live Free or Die Hard (2007). She played Tori Wu in The Divergent Series.

Daniel Henney, having gained fame overseas in South Korea, has since starred in American films X-Men Origins: Wolverine (2009), The Last Stand (2013), and the animated Oscar-winning Disney film Big Hero 6 (2014).

The international star Joan Chen (Chong Chen) was featured in numerous films from China, the United States, Australia, and many other countries. She has won numerous awards for her acting and has also directed a film.

South-Korean actor and superstar Lee Byung-hun, has already starred in numerous American production including Red 2 (2013), G.I. Joe: The Rise of Cobra (2009), G.I. Joe: Retaliation (2013) and Terminator Genisys (2015). Indian superstar and actress Priyanka Chopra is beginning to work in American cinema and is currently filming the action comedy Baywatch (2017).

2017 was a landmark year for Asian-American actors in major film projects. Jacob Batalon, a Filipino-American actor, starred as Ned in Spider-Man: Homecoming. Kumail Nanjiani, a Pakistani American actor, starred as the male lead in The Big Sick, a film which he also co-wrote. Hong Chau received nominations for Best Supporting Actress from the Golden Globes and Screen Actors Guild for her role of Ngoc Lan Tran in Downsizing. Kelly Marie Tran and Veronica Ngo, both of Vietnamese descent, starred in the space opera Star Wars: The Last Jedi as Rose Tico and Paige Tico, respectively.

In 2018, Daniel Wu was the male lead in Tomb Raider, a first for a franchise in Hollywood. Wu, who is one of Hong Kong's biggest film stars, previously starred alongside Oscar-winner Kevin Spacey in Chinese-American writer-director Dayyan Eng's indie film Inseparable (2011). He also starred and produced Into the Badlands, the AMC TV series loosely based on The Monkey King.

Also in 2018, Aziz Ansari, star of the Netflix original comedy series Master of None, won a Golden Globe award for Best Actor in a Television Series Music or Comedy. He is the first person of Asian descent to win this award, making him the first to win a best actor award in a television category. He also won Outstanding Writing For a Comedy Series at the 2017 Emmy Awards. Ansari created the show because he was not being cast in interesting roles, and took issue with Indian representation on television. These characters were stereotyped roles, and actors were asked to do Indian accents. Ansari turned down a role in the 2007 film Transformers because he refused to do an Indian accent.

In 2020, Awkwafina was the first person of Asian descent to win a Golden Globe Award for best actress in a musical or comedy, for The Farewell. Directed by Lulu Wang, the film follows the lives of a Chinese-American family dealing with the death of their grandmother. This film was also nominated for Best Foreign Language film, but lost to the South Korean film Parasite.

=== Film directors ===
M. Night Shyamalan has directed a number of movies, including Signs, The Village, Unbreakable, and the Academy Award-nominated The Sixth Sense.

Mira Nair has acclaimed movies including Salaam Bombay, Monsoon Wedding, and The Namesake to her credit.

Director Justin Lin brought attention to the experiences of Asian Americans through his movie Better Luck Tomorrow, which had an almost exclusively Asian American cast. He has since directed The Fast and the Furious: Tokyo Drift, its prequel Fast & Furious, and the sequels Fast Five, Fast & Furious 6, and F9. Outside of the Fast and Furious saga, he directed Star Trek Beyond.

Cary Fukunaga, an American of Japanese and Swedish descent, won the directing and cinematography awards at the 2009 Sundance Film Festival for Sin Nombre. His 2011 film adaptation of Charlotte Brontë's Jane Eyre, starring Mia Wasikowska and Michael Fassbender, was also well received.

Jennifer Yuh Nelson is a storyboard artist and film director. She directed Kung Fu Panda 2 (becoming the first female director to solely direct a major American animated film and the first Asian-American to direct a major American animated film), Kung Fu Panda 3, and The Darkest Minds.

Wayne Wang is a pioneering director and writer of Asian American cinema, having made notable films such as Chan is Missing, Dim Sum: A Little Bit of Heart, Life Is Cheap... But Toilet Paper Is Expensive, Chinese Box, A Thousand Years of Good Prayers, The Princess of Nebraska, The Joy Luck Club, and Eat a Bowl of Tea. He was well known in the 90s for directing the hit independent film Smoke, and has had mainstream success with the films Anywhere but Here, Maid in Manhattan, and Snow Flower and the Secret Fan.

Gregg Araki is an influential American independent filmmaker of Japanese ancestry, who is known for his often playful, punk-influenced work dealing with young, often gay, members of Generation X trying to define themselves in the wake of the AIDS epidemic, rampant consumerism, and childhood trauma. His films The Doom Generation, The Living End and Nowhere were seen to exemplify the alienation and hedonistic abandon of their times, while his 2004 film Mysterious Skin, featuring Joseph Gordon-Levitt in a dramatic role, was highly acclaimed for a dark and realistic portrait of the effects of child sexual abuse.

Dayyan Eng, who is known as Wu Shixian in China, is a Chinese-American of mixed ancestry. His film Bus 44 was the first-ever Chinese language short film to win an award at Venice Film Festival and Sundance Film Festival, and to be invited to Cannes Film Festival Director's Fortnight. He was also the first American to write and direct a Chinese film (Waiting Alone), and the only non-Chinese national to date to have a film nominated for Best Picture at the Chinese academy awards. Eng's 2011 indie film Inseparable, starring Oscar-winner Kevin Spacey and Daniel Wu, was the first fully Chinese-funded film to have a Hollywood star in the lead, and was on The Wall Street Journal's "Top 10 Most Notable Asian Films of 2011". In 2017, Eng directed the indie summer box office fantasy-comedy Wished, which held the highest audience scores for local Chinese comedies across all four ticketing platforms. It was subsequently optioned to be remade in the US as an American film.

So Yong Kim is a Korean American independent filmmaker who was awarded the Special Jury Prize at Sundance for her debut feature, In Between Days, which was shot in Toronto, but was loosely based on her own experiences growing up in Los Angeles as a newly arrived immigrant who felt alienated from the surrounding world. Its protagonist is a teenage Korean girl transplanted to North America who must take responsibility for her own life, as her mother is not around much, and her father is estranged. A raw, largely improvised romance shot digitally with first-time actors, In Between Days received enough attention for Kim to make her next film, the childhood drama Treeless Mountain, in her birth country of South Korea. Her latest and third feature, For Ellen, is set in the United States and stars Paul Dano as a man going through a divorce.

The 2018 film Crazy Rich Asians, directed by Jon M. Chu, features several Asian American actors in prominent roles, including Constance Wu. The film was nominated for Best Motion Picture – Musical or Comedy and Best Performance by an Actress in a Motion Picture – Musical or Comedy at the 2019 Golden Globe Awards.

Minari, directed by Lee Isaac Chung, featured an almost entirely Asian cast, including Asian-Americans Steven Yeun and Alan Kim, who received several award nominations for their performances. Chung is the first Asian born in the United States to be nominated for the Academy Award for Best Director, and was also nominated for Academy Award for Best Original Screenplay.

The 2019 film Always Be My Maybe, directed by Nahnatchka Khan, features Asian American actors Ali Wong and Randall Park. The film denies the popular impression that being an Asian American also means being a model minority.

=== Other notable film contributors ===
==== Makeup and hairstyling ====
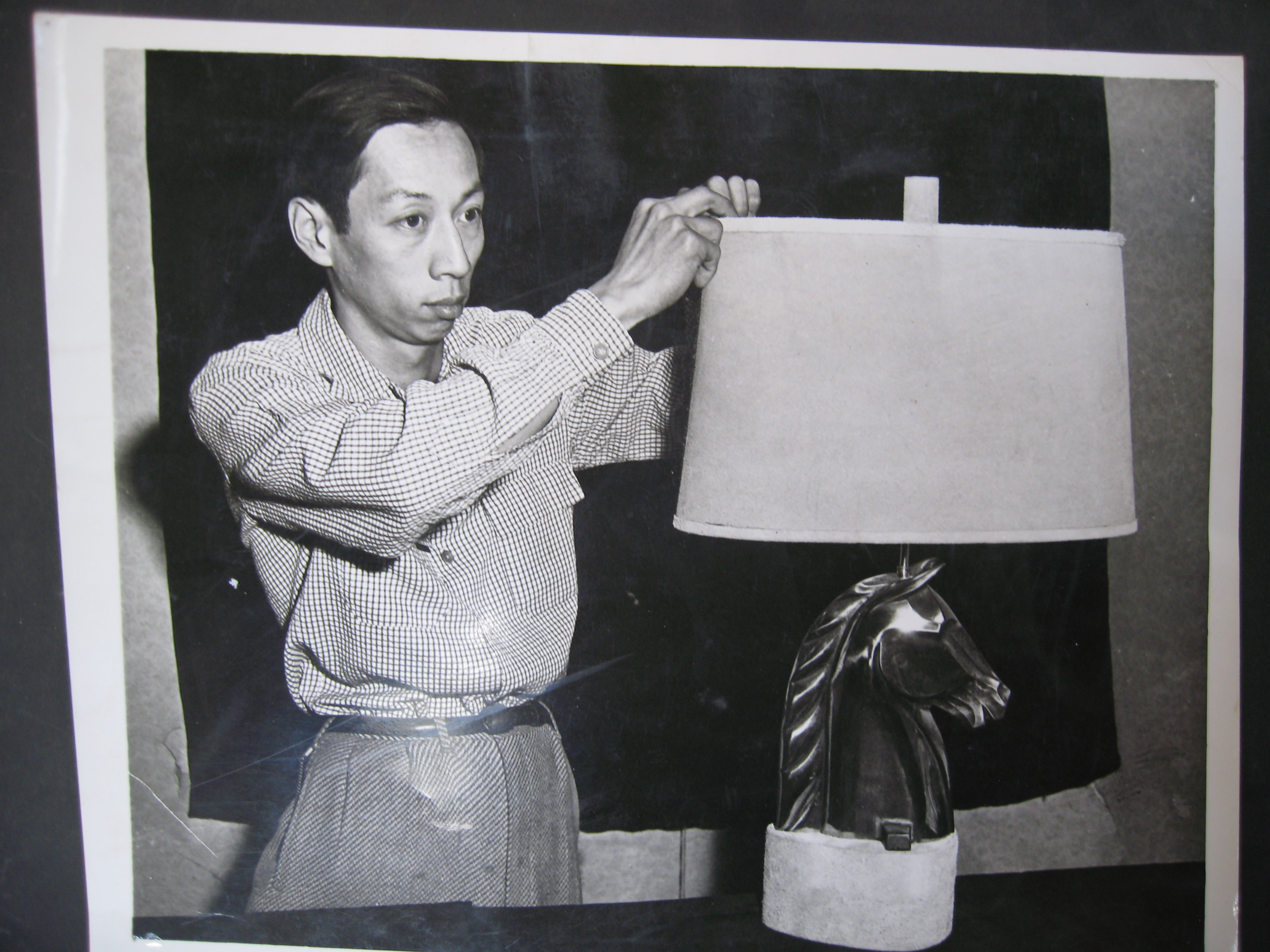
Wah Chang

Kazu Hiro won the Academy Award for Best Makeup and Hairstyling in 2018 and 2020, winning the second award as an American citizen.

==== Prop design ====
Wah Chang was the designer for many of the props on the Star Trek series as well as The Time Machine, which received an Academy Award for special effects.

==== Director of photography ====
Larry Fong was the director of photography on Hollywood hits 300, Watchmen, Super 8, and Suckerpunch.

==== Film editing ====
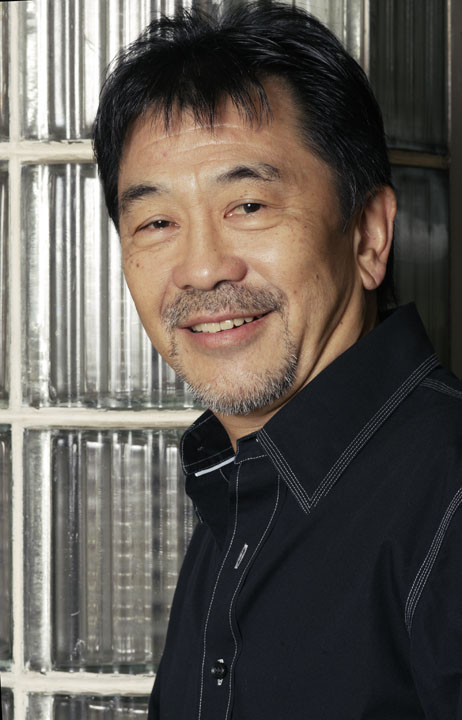
Richard Chew (2009)

Mark Yoshikawa was the editor of several of Terrence Malick's films, including The New World, The Tree of Life, and Knight of Cups.

Richard Chew was the first Asian-American to win a Film Editing Oscar (Star Wars: A New Hope, 1977). He also earned an Oscar nomination for his work on One Flew Over the Cuckoo's Nest. Both rank in the 30 highest-grossing films of the 1970s.

Chew's feature film career spans five decades, with credits including The Conversation, My Favorite Year, Risky Business, Clean and Sober, Singles, Shanghai Noon, and I Am Sam.

==== Cinematography ====
Curt Apduhan is a NATAS News/Documentary Cinematography Emmy-winning cinematographer for the Sundance Channel feature documentary Amargosa, about a dancer who performs in an opera house in a California ghost town.

==== Production illustration ====
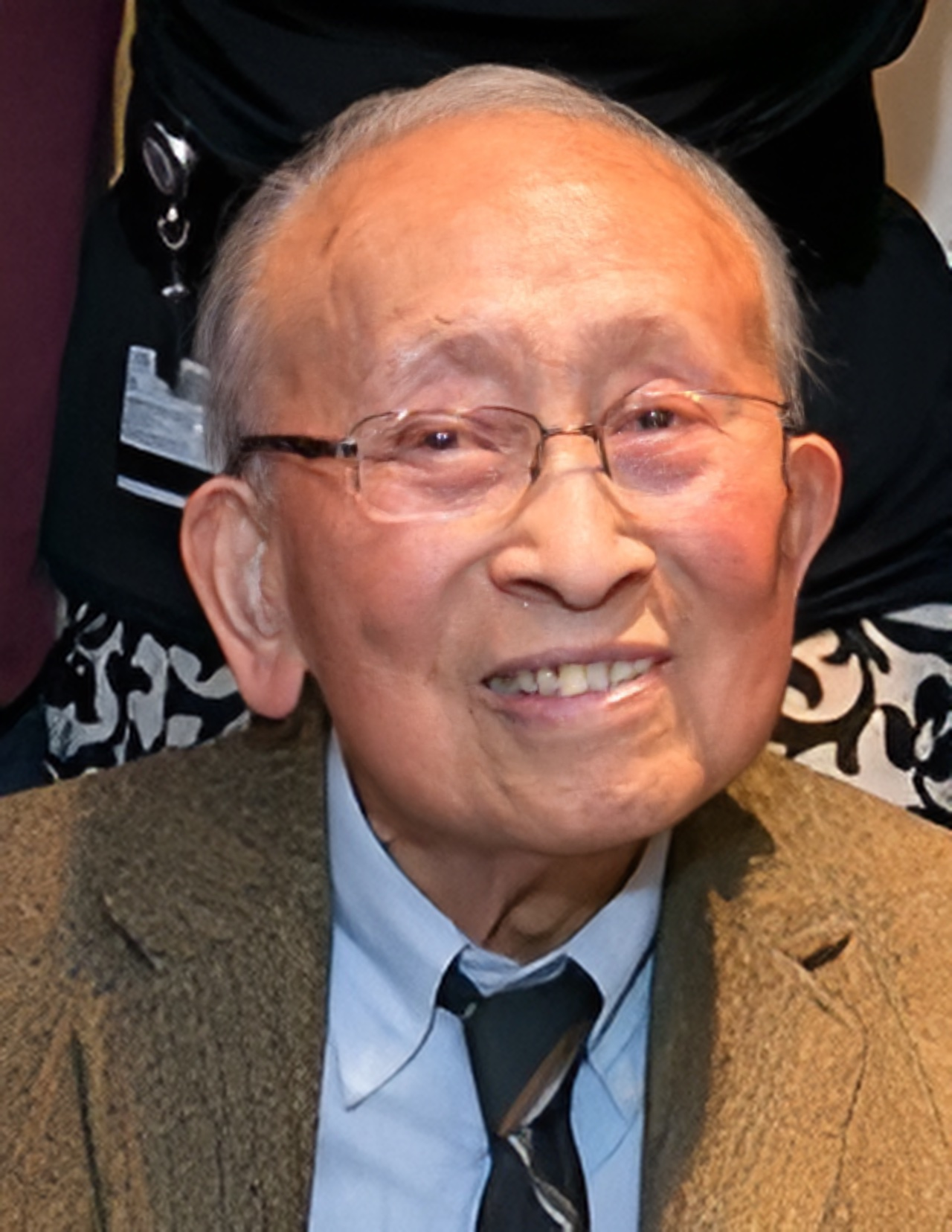
Tyrus Wong

Tyrus Wong was a production illustrator and sketch artist for Walt Disney Studio's Bambi (1942) as well as the following Warner Brothers Studio films: Sands of Iwo Jima (1949), April in Paris (1952), Calamity Jane (1953), Rebel Without a Cause (1955), Auntie Mame (1959), Harper (1963), PT 109 (1963), and The Wild Bunch (1969). In 2001, he was awarded by the Walt Disney Company the award of Disney Legends.

=== Films with Asian-American leads ===
Flower Drum Song is a 1961 film.

The Joy Luck Club is a 1993 movie, based on the 1989 best-selling novel of the same name written by Amy Tan. It is the story of four women who were born in China and eventually came to America, and of their daughters. It was directed by Wayne Wang, and stars Tsai Chin, Kieu Chinh, Lisa Lu, France Nuyen, Rosalind Chao, Lauren Tom, Tamlyn Tomita, and Ming-Na Wen.

The Namesake is a 2006 film directed by Mira Nair and written by Sooni Taraporevala based on the novel of the same name by Jhumpa Lahiri. The movie depicts the struggles of Ashoke and Ashima Ganguli (Irrfan Khan and Tabu), first-generation immigrants from the East Indian state of West Bengal to the United States, and their American-born children Gogol (Kal Penn) and Sonia (Sahira Nair). The film takes place primarily in Kolkata and New York City.

Crazy Rich Asians is a 2018 romantic comedy directed by Jon M. Chu. The film follows the life of Rachel Chu (Constance Wu) and Nick Young (Henry Golding) to attend his best friend's wedding in Singapore. Nick fails to mention that he is the son of one of the country's wealthiest families, and Rachel must navigate her journey as she meets his family for the first time. It was the first major Hollywood picture with an all-Asian principal cast since The Joy Luck Club in 1993.

Always Be My Maybe is a 2019 romantic comedy directed by Nahnatchka Khan. It was written by Ali Wong, Randall Park, and Michael Golamco. The film follows the lives of Sasha Tran (Ali Wong) and Marcus Kim (Randall Park), who are childhood neighbors and friends in San Francisco.

To All The Boys I've Loved Before is a 2018 romance film directed by Susan Johnson based on a novel by Jenny Han and released by Netflix on August 17, 2018. The film stars Lana Condor and Noah Centineo. The critical success of the film led to two sequels, To All the Boys: P.S. I Still Love You (2020) and To All the Boys: Always and Forever (2021), alongside a spin-off series titled XO, Kitty.

Shang-Chi and the Legend of the Ten Rings is a 2021 superhero film directed by Destin Daniel Cretton, starring Chinese-Canadian Simu Liu in the titular role alongside Awkwafina, Tony Leung, and Michelle Yeoh. The film revolves around Shang-Chi, who abandons his father Wenwu (Leung) and his terrorist organization, the Ten Rings, living a normal life in San Francisco before being called back by his father for a final mission.

Everything Everywhere All at Once is a 2022 absurdist comedy-drama co-directed by the Daniels, starring Michelle Yeoh, Stephanie Hsu, and Ke Huy Quan. The film centers around Evelyn Wang (Yeoh) travelling through dimensions to fight prime evil Jobu Tupaki while resolving her relationship with her alienated daughter Joy (Hsu).

Joy Ride is a 2023 comedy directed by Adele Lim. It follows Audrey Sullivan (Ashley Park), Kat Huang (Stephanie Hsu), Lolo (Sherry Cola), and Deadeye (Sabrina Wu) as they go on a hilarious adventure.

Quiz Lady is a 2023 comedy film directed by Jessica Wu. The film follows the lives of two sisters. It stars Sandrah Oh and Awkwafina.

The Half of It is a 2020 coming-of age-film directed by Alice Wu. It follows a closeted Chinese-American teenager who secretly writes love letters to her crush. The film stars actress Leah Lewis.

== Theater ==
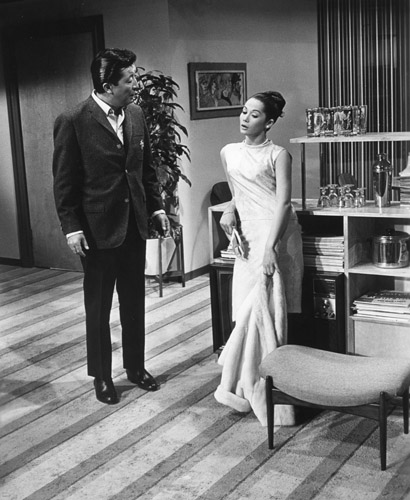
Jack Soo and Nancy Kwan in Flower Drum Song

=== 1950s ===
The musical Flower Drum Song was based on the 1957 novel The Flower Drum Song, by Chinese-American author C. Y. Lee, which in turn was based on the San Francisco nightclub Forbidden City that was popular for military men in transit during World War II. Rodgers and Hammerstein adapted it into a musical produced on Broadway in 1958 and on film in 1961, and both starred a number of Asian American actors. Largely remembered for the hit song "I Enjoy Being A Girl", it was not produced with an all-Asian American cast until a 2002 Broadway revival.

The 1958–1959 Broadway production of The World of Suzie Wong was based on the 1957 novel of the same name. It starred France Nuyen (born France Nguyễn Vân Nga) and William Shatner, and featured Mary Mon Toy. It later became the British-American feature film The World of Suzie Wong (1960), with Nancy Kwan as Suzie Wong. Nuyen went on to portray Dr. Paulette Kiem on the 1980s television series St. Elsewhere (1986–1988).

=== 1960s ===
East West Players logo (2013)

In 1965, frustrated with the limited opportunities given to them, actors Mako, James Hong, Beulah Quo, Pat Li, and June Kim, together with Guy Lee and Yet Lock, formed East West Players (EWP), a Los Angeles-based Asian American theater company – the first of its kind. They produced their own shows to allow Asian American actors the opportunity to perform a wide range of leading roles. As the need still exists, EWP continues today. Dozens of other Asian American theater companies have since formed in major cities throughout the US, providing similar outlets.

=== 1980s ===
In 1988, playwright David Henry Hwang's Broadway hit M. Butterfly won a Tony Award for Best Play, among other awards.

=== 1990s ===
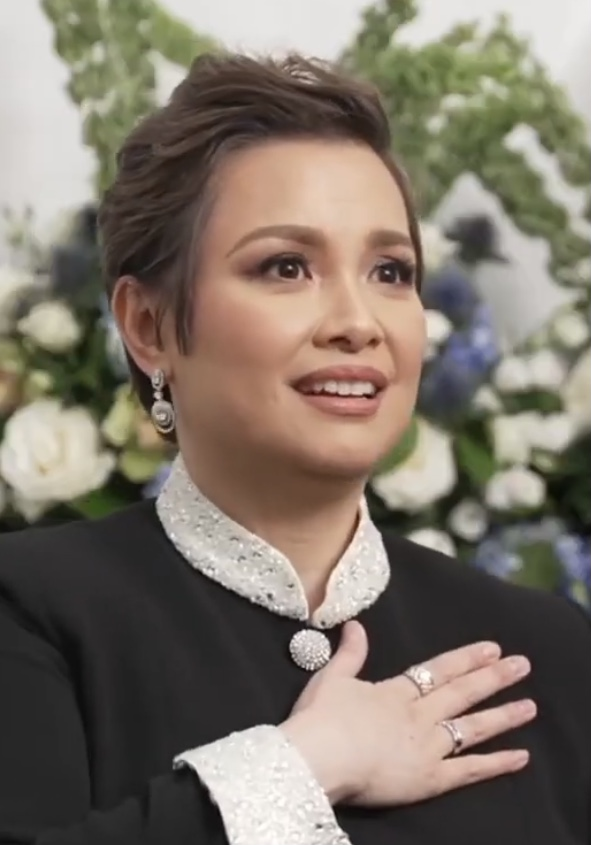
Lea Salonga (2021)

When Miss Saigon opened at the Broadway Theatre in 1991, Filipino actress and singer Lea Salonga played the lead role of Kim. For her performance, she won the Drama Desk, Outer Critics Circle, Theatre World, and Tony awards, becoming the first actress of Asian descent to win the Tony Award for Best Actress in a Musical.

Margaret Cho won the American Comedy Award for Best Female Comedian in 1994. Comedian Byron Yee's show Paper Son was awarded "Outstanding Solo Show" at the New York International Fringe Festival.

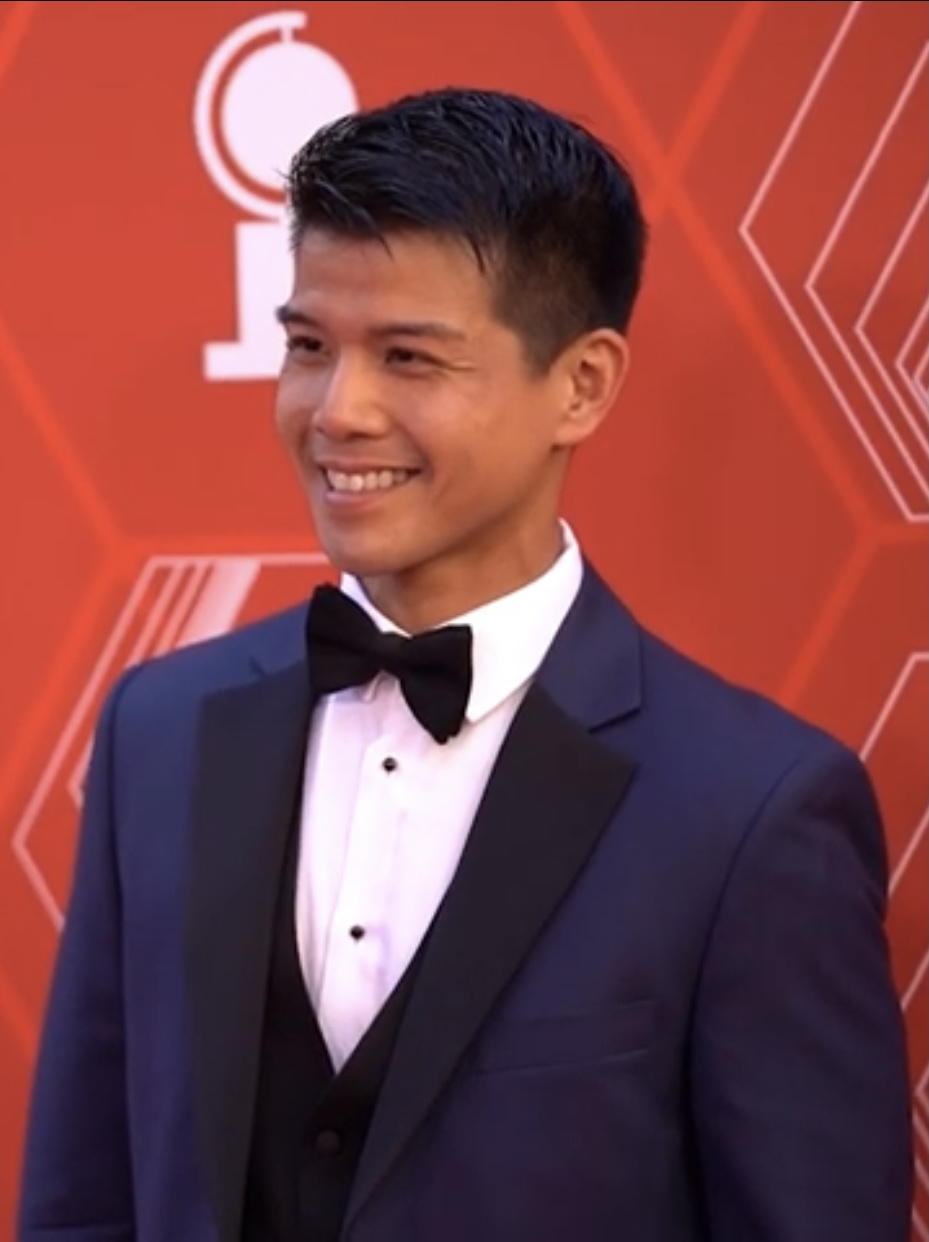
Telly Leung (2021)

=== 2000s ===
Telly Leung started his Broadway career in 2002 as a performer in Flower Drum Song. He later performed in Pacific Overtures, Wicked, Rent (both on Broadway as a performer and as Angel at the Hollywood Bowl), and Godspell. He originated the role of Young Sam in George Takei's Allegiance.

In the 2005 Broadway production of the Tony Award-winning musical The 25th Annual Putnam County Spelling Bee, Deborah S. Craig originated the role of Marcy Park, the first Korean-American character on Broadway.

BD Wong, who starred in the Broadway production of M. Butterfly, is the only actor to have won a Tony Award, a Drama Desk Award, an Outer Critics Circle Award, a Clarence Derwent Award, and a Theatre World Award.

Disgraced, a play about Islamophobia, written by Pakistani American Ayad Akhtar, won the 2013 Pulitzer Prize for Drama. Actors who have played the lead role include Aasif Mandvi and Hari Dhillon.

Allegiance, which ran on Broadway from October 2015 to February 2016, is set during the Japanese American internment of World War II (with a framing story set in the present day), and was inspired by the personal experiences of George Takei, who stars in the musical along with Lea Salonga.

Phillipa Soo starred as Natasha Rostova in Natasha, Pierre & The Great Comet of 1812 in the Off-Broadway production, and as Elizabeth Schuyler in the original Broadway cast of Hamilton, which won a cast Grammy Award for musical theater album.

Kimiko Glenn starred as Dawn in the original Broadway cast of Waitress, the musical adaption of the film of the same name.

=== Theater set design ===
==== Ming Cho Lee ====
Ming Cho Lee was a Chinese-American professor at Yale School of Drama. He won the 2013 Tony Award for Lifetime Achievement as an acclaimed set designer for theater. He won the following awards as well:

- Drama Desk Awards for Outstanding Set Design (several awards, starting with Billy in 1969)
- The Helen Hayes Awards
  - Six awards for Outstanding Set Design, Resident Production, from 1996 to 2002
  - Helen Hayes Tribute Award (2006)
- 1983 Tony Award for Best Scenic Design for K2
- 2002 National Medal of Arts
- 1995 Obie Award for Sustained Excellence
- 2013 Tony Award for Lifetime Achievement

== Television ==
=== Television actors / actresses ===
==== 1950s ====
Anna May Wong was the first actress as well as acting professional of Asian descent to be the leading star of a US television series with The Gallery of Madame Liu-Tsong, where she played a detective and Chinese art dealer. For her work in the motion picture industry, please see Film: 1920s-Anna May Wong.

===== 1960s–1970s =====
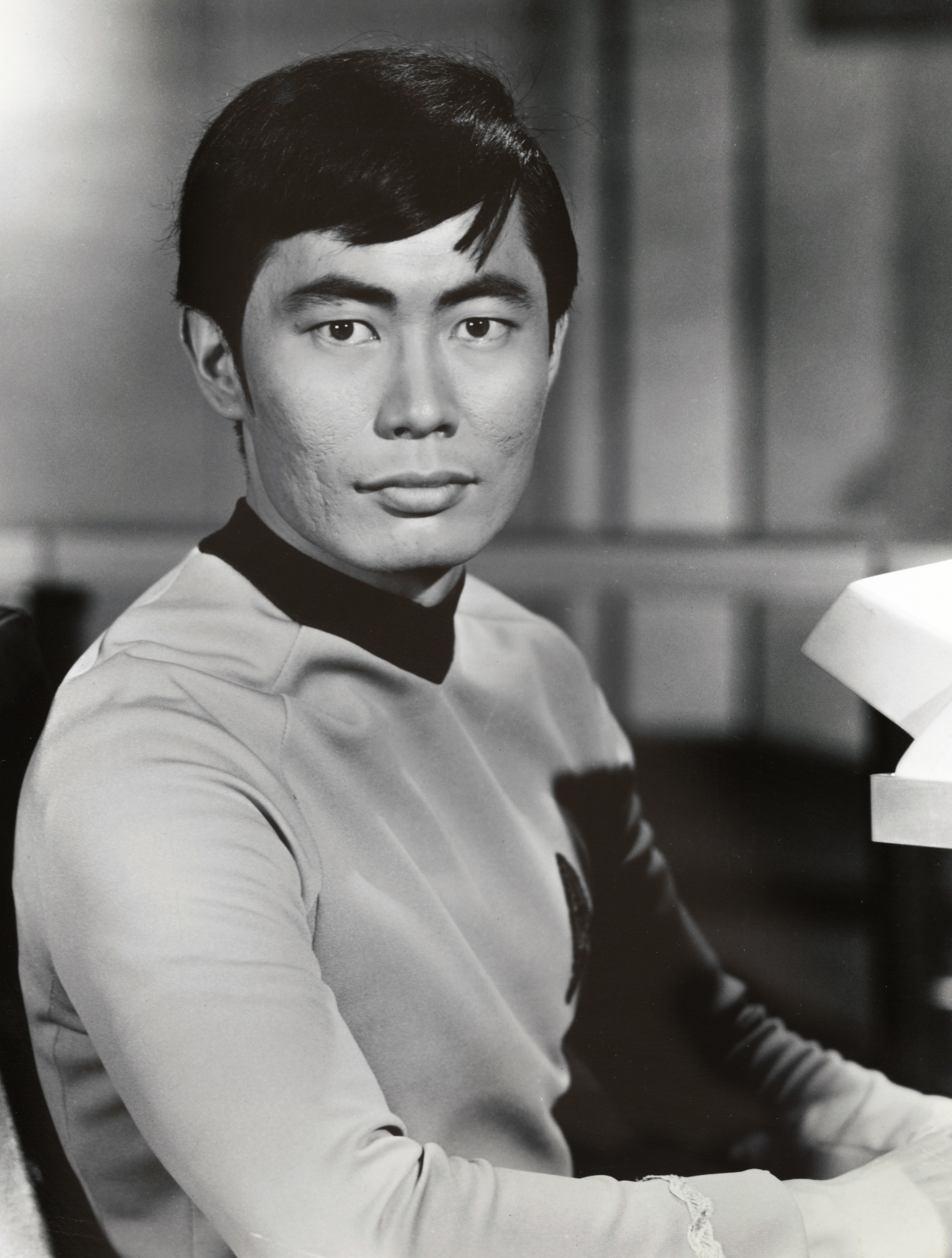
George Takei as Lieutenant Hikaru Sulu in the 1960s show Star Trek

Academy Award winner Miyoshi Umeki was the housekeeper/nanny who offered sage advice in The Courtship of Eddie's Father (1969–1972), a television series that starred Bill Bixby as the father/widower.

George Takei and Pat Morita became famous for supporting roles in Star Trek and Happy Days, respectively. In 1976, Morita starred on the first American sitcom centered on a person of Asian descent, Mr. T and Tina, and went on to become widely known as the mentor Mr. Miyagi in The Karate Kid movies of the 1980s.

Other Asian Americans from this period include Bruce Lee on The Green Hornet and Jack Soo of Barney Miller. Also noteworthy were Philip Ahn and Keye Luke, who portrayed Master Kan and Master Po on the television series Kung Fu; Keye Luke was the voice of Charlie Chan on the 1972 animated series The Amazing Chan and the Chan Clan, which featured a mystery-solving Chinese American family.

==== 1980s–1990s ====
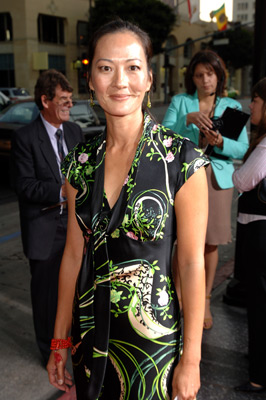
Rosalind Chao (2005)

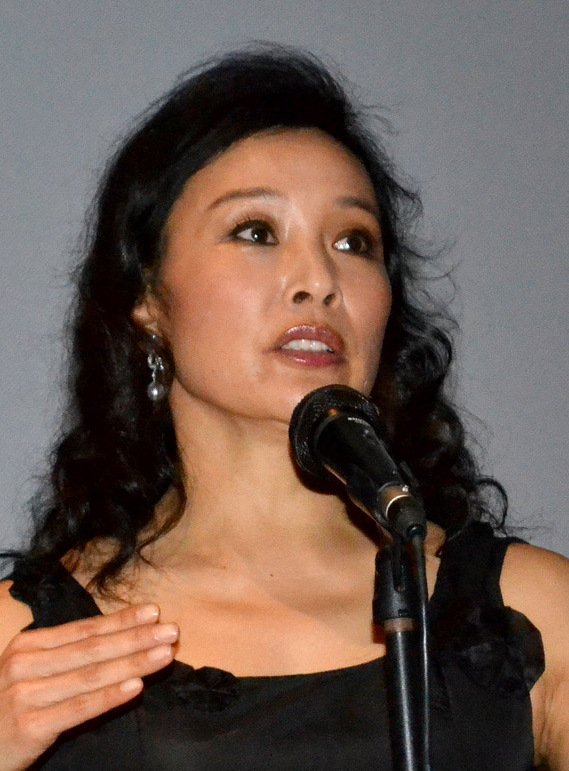
Joan Chen (2012)

France Nuyen (born Francis Nguyễn Vân Nga) played Dr. Paulette Kiem on the 1980s television series St. Elsewhere (1983–1988). Prior to that, she was an actress in the motion picture industry. (Please see Miyoshi Umeki, Frances Nuyen, and James Shigeta.) Rosalind Chao played Soon-Lee Klinger on AfterMASH (1983–1985), and portrayed Keiko O'Brien on Star Trek: The Next Generation (1987–1994) and Star Trek: Deep Space Nine (1993–1999).

Chinese American actress Joan Chen had a major role on David Lynch's cult classic television series Twin Peaks, which ran from 1990 to 1991. Like many other original cast members, she also had a scene in the prequel film Twin Peaks: Fire Walk with Me, which was deleted and later released in 2014 along with other deleted scenes in Twin Peaks: The Missing Pieces. Chen did not her reprise her role as Josie Packard in the limited event series in 2017.

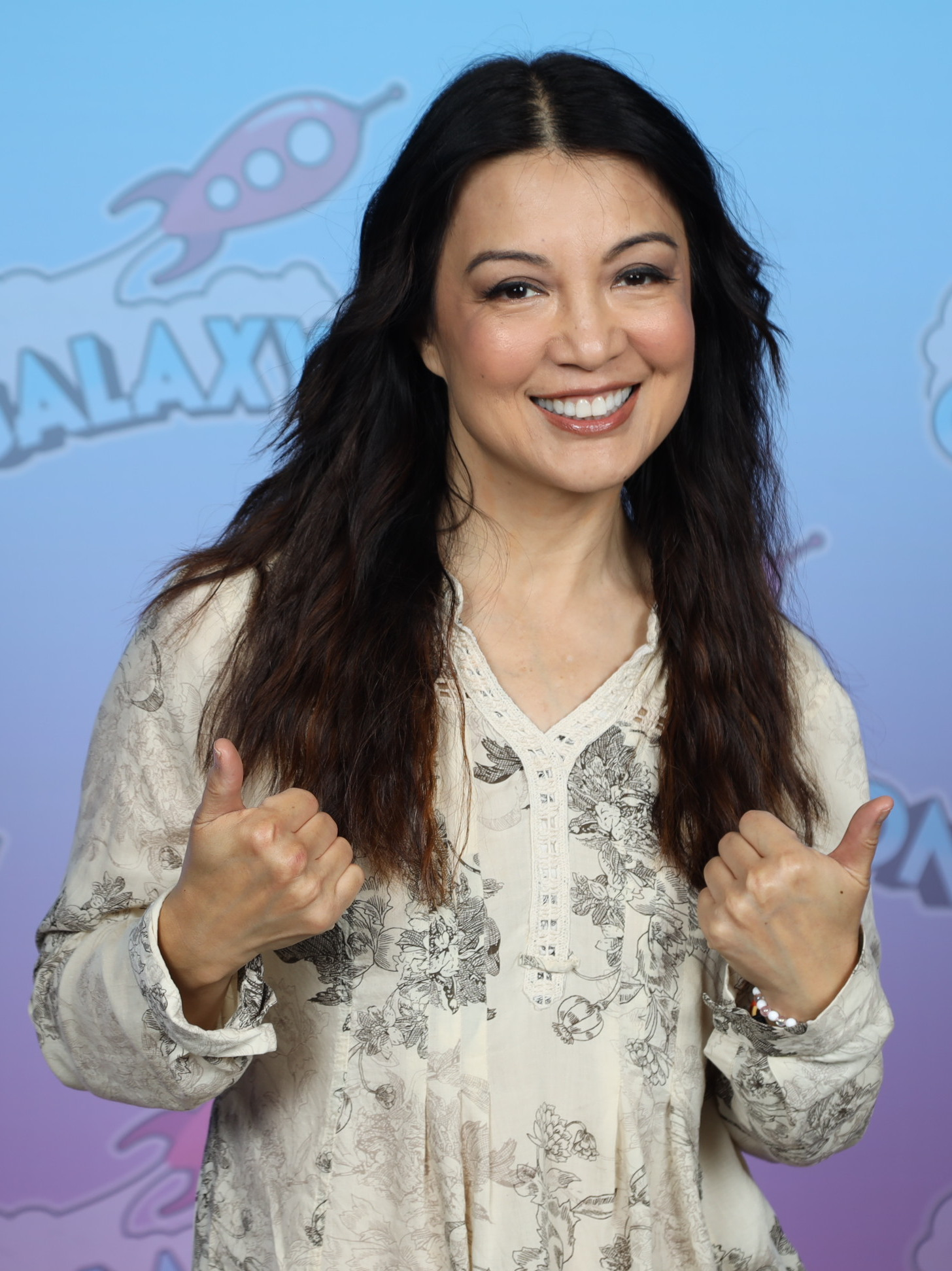
Ming-Na Wen (2023)

After landing a role on As the World Turns, Ming-Na Wen starred as Dr. Deb Chen in the medical drama television series ER from 1995 to 2004, and played a lead role in The Joy Luck Club (1993). She starred in other successful television series such as Stargate Universe, and lent her voice to the protagonist in the animated film Mulan (1998).

Mark-Paul Gosselaar and Jennie Kwan were known to teen and children audiences for their roles on the television series Saved by the Bell and California Dreams respectively. The late Thuy Trang is known for her role as the original yellow ranger Trini Kwan on the children's television series Mighty Morphin Power Rangers, and other Asian American actors have since starred in the Power Rangers franchise.

==== 1990s–2000s ====
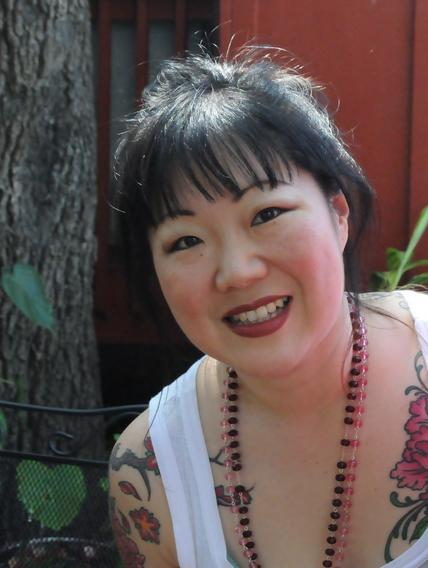
Margaret Cho

Margaret Cho, stand-up comedian and actress, had a leading role in her own comedy series All-American Girl in the 1990s. Her character was a Korean-American (as is Cho) who struggled with her family and cultural issues in San Francisco. The series included other Asian American actors such as Amy Hill. Despite being groundbreaking in prime-time television, All American Girl was canceled after one season due to low ratings. After its run, due to the way it was handled and the pressures that were forced on her to conform to vague mainstream expectations to try to make the series a success, Cho suffered from drug and alcohol addiction, and attempted suicide. Cho has since regained popularity and success from her 2000 one-woman show I'm the One That I Want and through her current involvement on Drop Dead Diva on Lifetime.

Lucy Liu had a major role on the television series Ally McBeal from 1998 to 2002, for which she was nominated for an Emmy Award. She now plays Joan Watson alongside Jonny Lee Miller (Sherlock Holmes) on Elementary.

==== 2000s ====
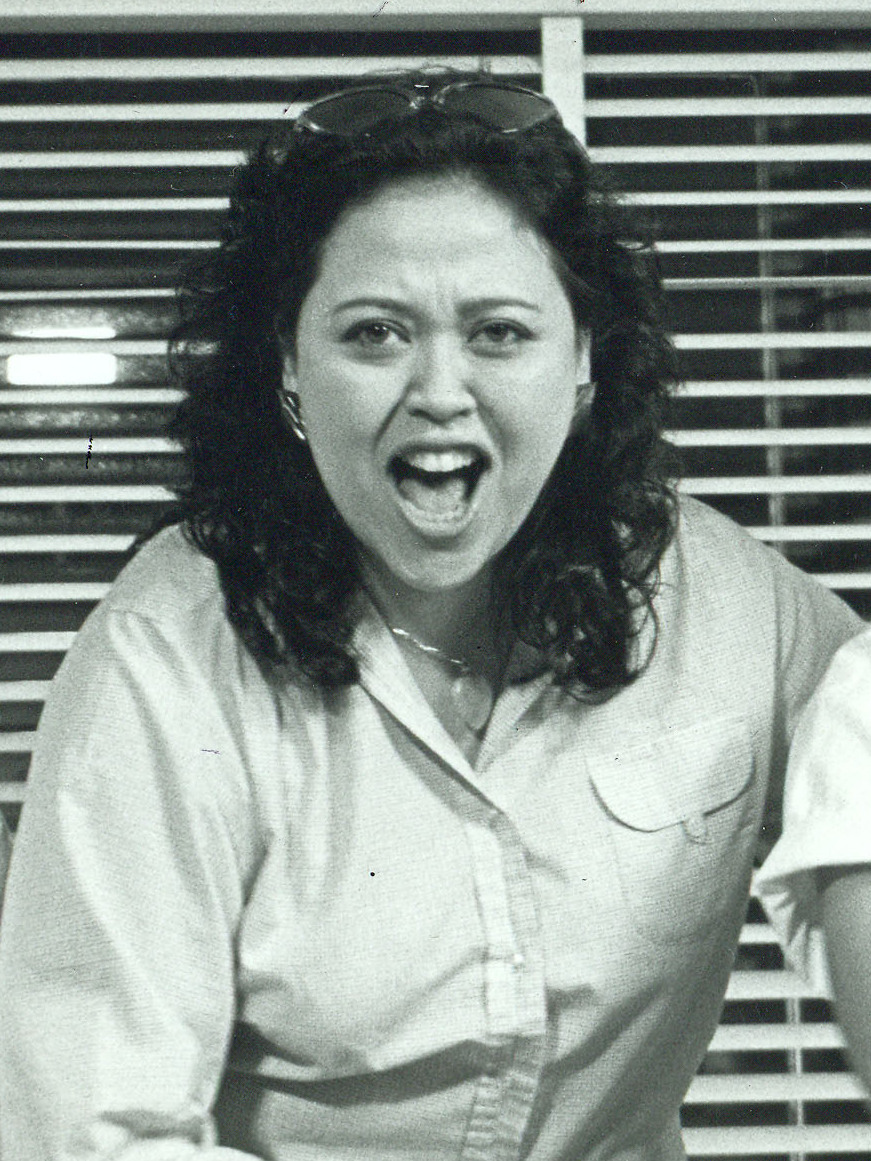
Amy Hill in a scene from the short film Dim Sum Takeouts (1983)

Amy Hill has been a mainstay of U.S. television for years as a recurring/character actress. Her notable roles include Mrs. DePaulo on That's So Raven, Mama Tohru on Jackie Chan Adventures, Mrs. Hasagawa on Lilo & Stitch: The Series, Ah-Mah Jasmine Lee on The Life and Times of Juniper Lee, Judy Harvey on Enlightened, Mah Mah on American Dad!, Dr. Wagerstein on UnREAL, and Lourdes Chan on Crazy Ex-Girlfriend.

Daniel Dae Kim and Sendhil Ramamurthy have achieved recognition as sex symbols for their respective roles on Lost. Kim moved on to Hawaii Five-0 and Heroes. Ramamurthy moved on to the television series Covert Affairs and Beauty & the Beast. Masi Oka starred on the cast of the television series Heroes, and is the only lead actor on the series to be nominated for either an Emmy Award or Golden Globe Award. James Kyson Lee also starred on Heroes.

Although not an actor, Jon Gosselin received sex symbol status from appearing on the reality series Jon and Kate Plus 8.

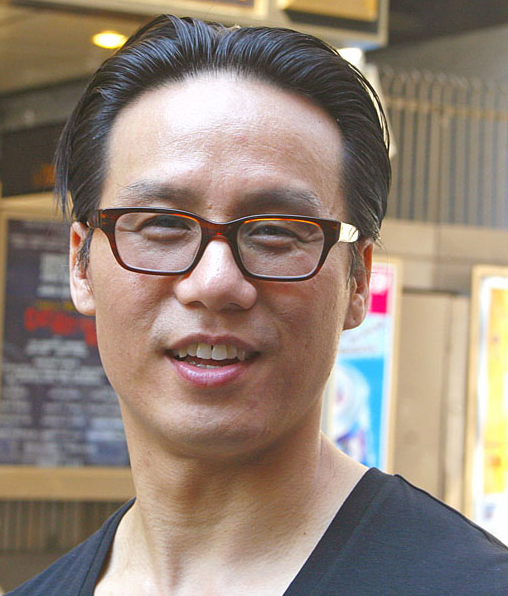
BD Wong (2008)

BD Wong, who starred in the Broadway production of M. Butterfly, is the only actor to have won a Tony Award, a Drama Desk Award, an Outer Critics Circle Award, a Clarence Derwent Award, and a Theatre World Award., He currently stars on Law & Order: Special Victims Unit after being featured in the series Oz.

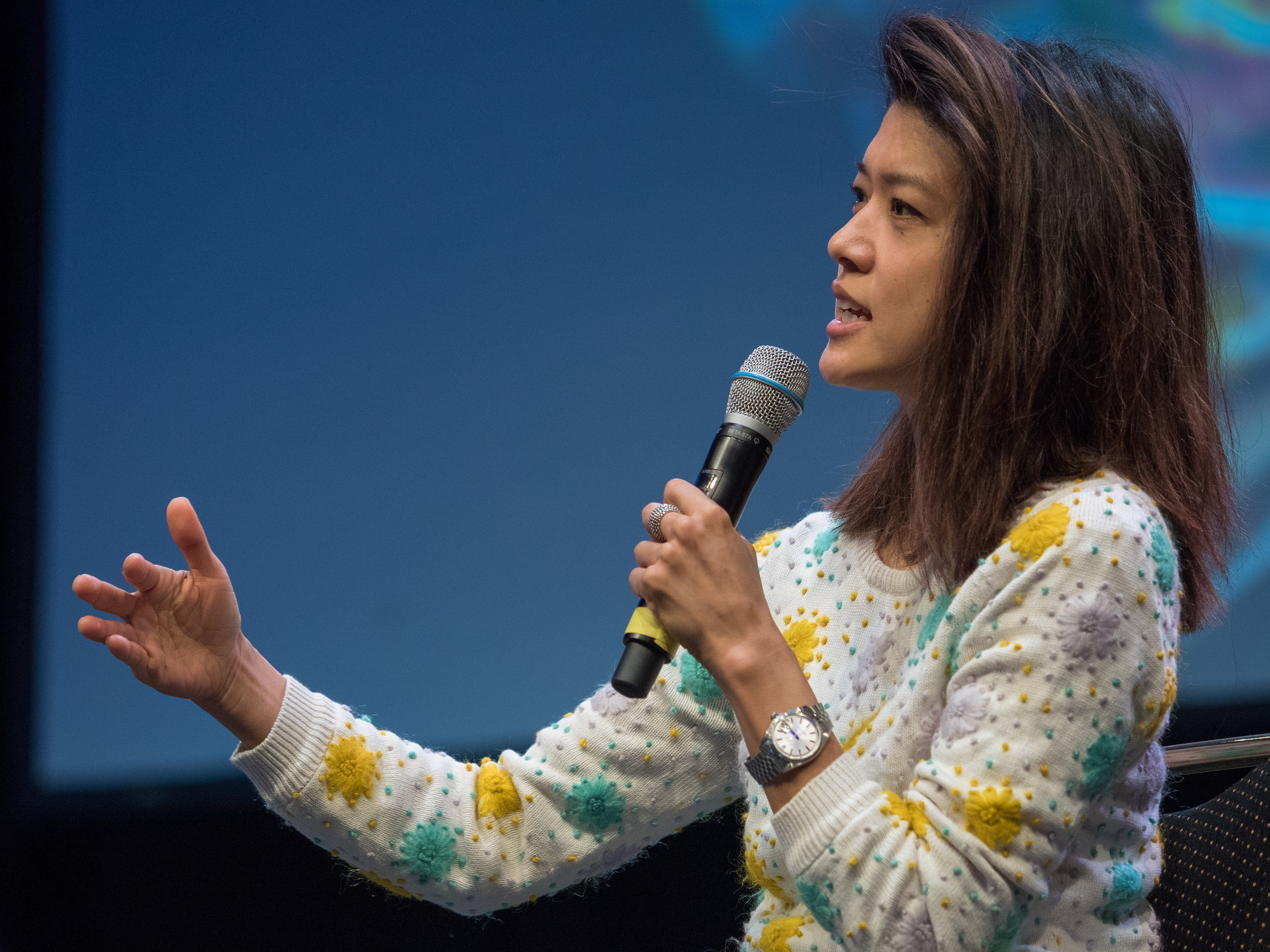
Grace Park

Asian American and Canadian actress Grace Park rose to fame on Battlestar Galactica and Edgemont (from Canada), and is now a cast member of Hawaii Five-0.

Kal Penn was formerly a regular on the medical television series House M.D. in one of his best-known roles. He later had a recurring role on How I Met Your Mother. Asian American actress Charlyne Yi was also a regular on House, and was with the series from 2011 until it ended.

Maggie Q, of Vietnamese, Polish and Irish descent, who first rose to fame in Hong Kong, achieved international fame when she starred as the title role on the television series Nikita. She also has a in role on the series Designated Survivor.

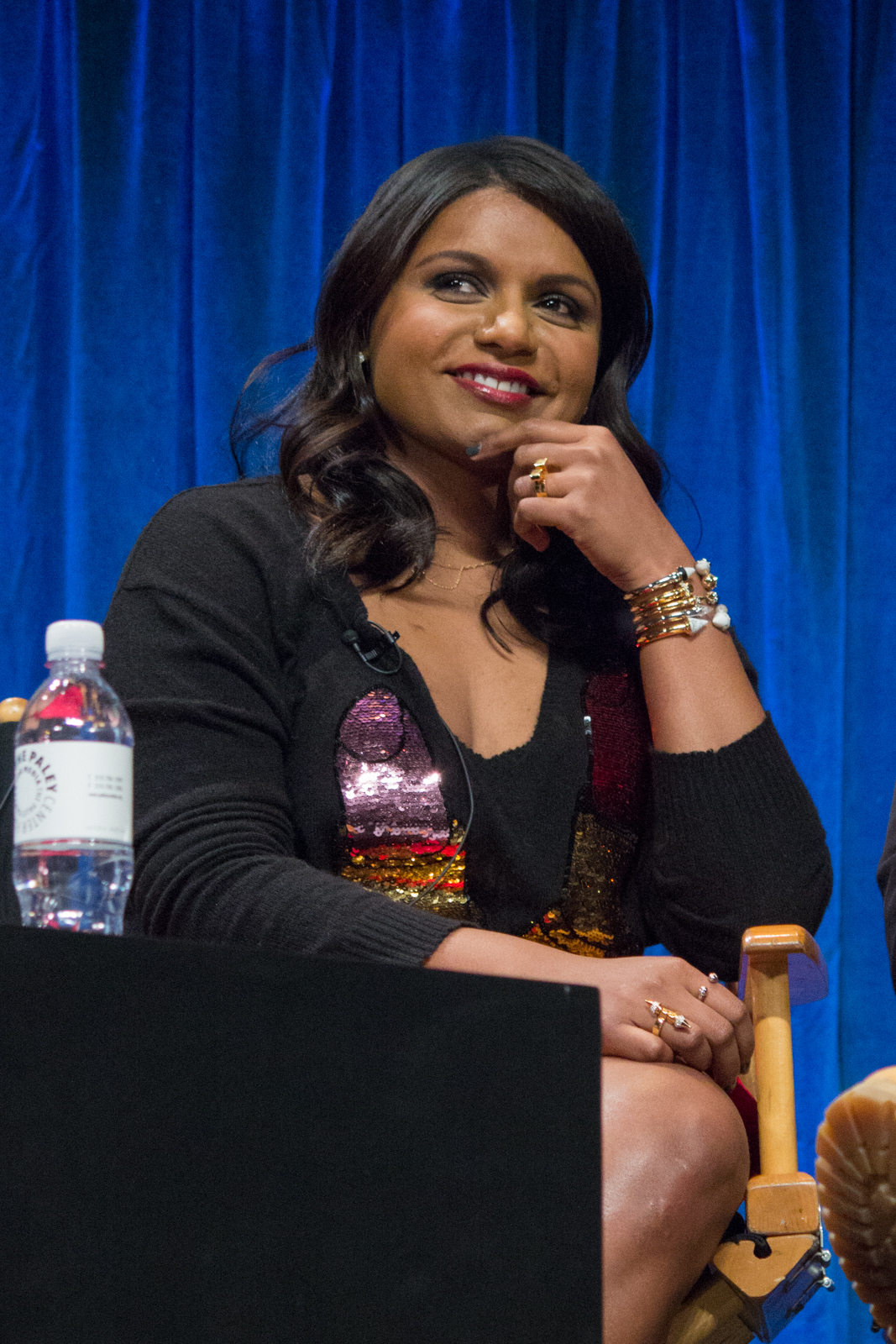
Mindy Kaling was the first South Asian American actor to be the series lead of a television show.

Mindy Kaling was a regular on the United States version of The Office since the beginning of the series in 2005 until 2012. She was then the series lead and creator of her own television series, The Mindy Project, which is the first U.S. television series with a South Asian American lead.

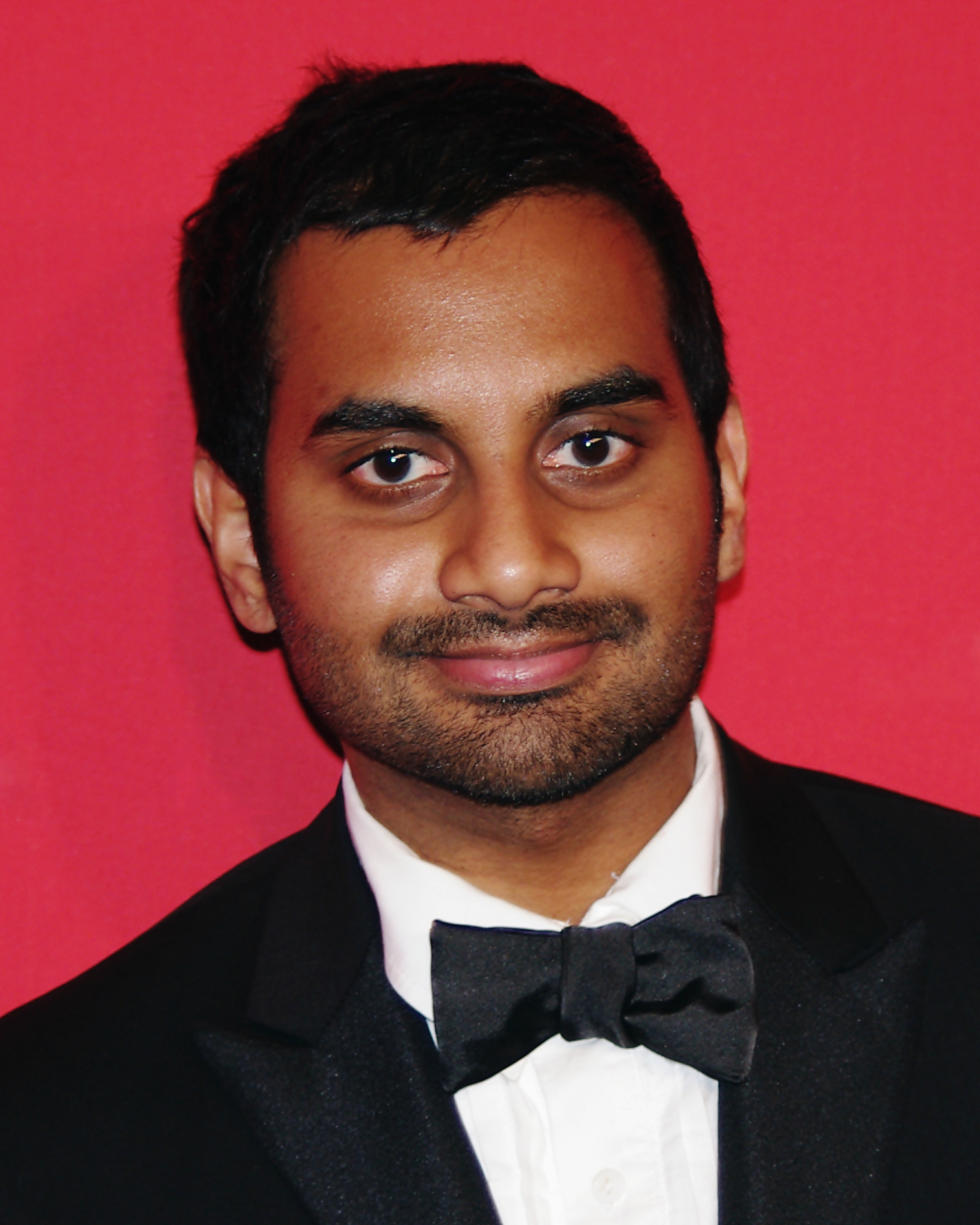
Aziz Ansari was the first Asian American actor to win a Golden Globe for acting in television.

Aziz Ansari was a series regular on the NBC comedy television series Parks and Recreation. He portrays the lead on his own series, Master of None. He made history by becoming the first Asian American actor to win a Golden Globe for acting in television.

Parminder Nagra (British Asian) was featured as a cast member on the medical drama ER as Dr. Neela Rasgotra for five seasons, from 2003 to 2009, the end of the series. She appeared on The Blacklist during the series' first season.

Archie Panjabi (British Asian) starred in the acclaimed CBS television series The Good Wife.

Reiko Aylesworth was part of the cast of the series 24.

Sonja Sohn was a series regular on the entire run of The Wire.

Brenda Song is a Thai-Hmong American actress known to younger audiences for starring in several Disney Channel productions, including The Suite Life of Zack & Cody, The Suite Life on Deck, Stuck in the Suburbs (2004), and Wendy Wu: Homecoming Warrior (2006). Ryan Potter first rose to prominence on the children's television series Supah Ninjas.

The U.S. television series Survivor created teams along racial lines during Survivor: Cook Islands. People of East and Southeast Asian ancestry composed the Asian American tribe. Asian American Yul Kwon won the season.

Tila Tequila was the star of the two-season MTV show A Shot at Love with Tila Tequila.

Olivia Munn, from Oklahoma of Chinese descent on her mother's side, is an actress, model, and television personality best known as a correspondent on The Jon Stewart Show. She co-hosted G4's Attack of the Show!, and appeared in movies such as Iron Man 2 (2010). South Korea-born SuChin Pak was a news correspondent frequently seen on MTV News and is now the host of G Word for Planet Green. Jamie Chung is a Korean-American actress and former reality television personality. She first gained fame in 2004 as a cast member on the MTV reality series The Real World: San Diego. She also appeared on its spin-off series, Real World/Road Rules Challenge: The Inferno II. She is regarded by many as the Real World alumna with the most successful media career.

Korean-American actress Yun Jin Kim and the Asian Canadian Sandra Oh of the ABC television series Lost and Grey's Anatomy, respectively, were during their series' runs the main two Asian American actors in lead roles on network television (the latter is still on air), although both part of large-ensemble casts, where minority characters are more likely to be found. Oh was nominated for many Emmy Awards, including Best Lead Actress in a Drama Series for her role in the BBC America series Killing Eve, and won a Golden Globe Award.

Korean-American actor Steven Yeun plays one of the leading roles as Glenn Rhee in AMC's The Walking Dead. Arden Cho is a Korean-American actress, singer and model, starring on the prominent television series Teen Wolf as Kira Yukimura.

Jenna Ushkowitz, Darren Criss and Harry Shum, Jr. of the teen series Glee are also prominent Asian American actors currently on network television. Darren Criss is a half-Filipino actor who also recently gained fame through the viral hit A Very Potter Musical and now Broadway theatre.

Danny Pudi and Ken Jeong are series regular on the NBC comedy series Community and through the run of the series, Pudi's character became the series' breakout character mainly due to the character's personality, popular culture references, and style of meta comedy. Jo Koy is a stand-up comic whose routines frequently focus on his Filipino heritage and life as an Asian-American. He was a frequent panelist on E!'s late night show Chelsea Lately and has two Netflix specials: Jo Koy: Comin' In Hot and Jo Koy: In His Elements. Ali Wong, stand-up comedian, actress, and writer, had a leading role in 2019 film Always Be My Maybe with Randall Park, who is also an Asian American comedian, actor, and writer. In addition, Netflix features stand-up specials by Ali Wong, Baby Cobra and Hard Knock Wife.

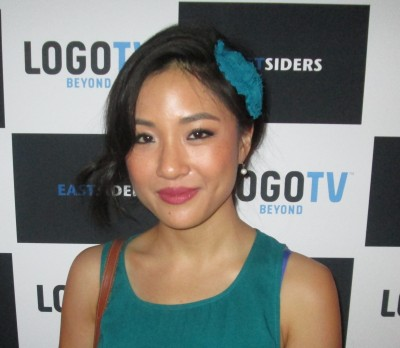
Constance Wu

The first American sitcom, Fresh Off the Boat, starring an all Asian-American family since Margaret Cho's All American Girl aired in February 2015, gaining overall critical acclaim among the television series community. Among its cast is Randall Park, Constance Wu, Hudson Yang and Ian Chen. It is loosely based on food personality Eddie Huang's book, Fresh Off the Boat: A Memoir.

The sitcom Dr. Ken featured an Asian American family and aired from 2015 to 2017.

Chloe Bennet is a Chinese-European American who gained fame as a pop star in China under the name, Wāng Kěyíng (汪可盈). She stars on Marvel's Agents of S.H.I.E.L.D. as one of the main leads alongside Ming-Na Wen. Daniel Henney, who is a half Korean American, also first gained fame overseas in South Korea had since been a recurring guest-star on CBS' Hawaii Five-0 and now stars on Criminal Minds: Beyond Borders.

Also a recurring guest star on Hawaii Five-0 is Ian Anthony Dale, who also starred on The Event and now stars on Murder in the First.

Ki Hong Lee has become well known for portraying Dong Nguyen in the Netflix series Unbreakable Kimmy Schmidt.

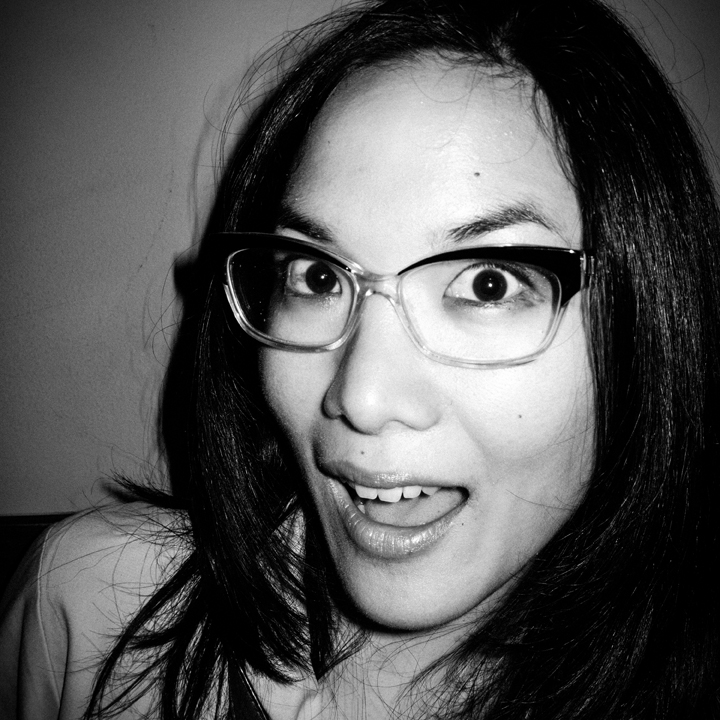
Ali Wong

==== 2020s ====
In 2024, Ali Wong won the Golden Globe for actress in a limited series for her portrayal of the character Amy Lau in the Netflix comedy-drama television mini-series Beef.

Lola Tung has risen in prominence as an actress after portraying Isabell "Belly" Conklin in the Amazon Prime series The Summer I Turned Pretty (2022), which is adapted after the young-adult novel trilogy of the same name written by Jenny Han.

=== Television writers ===
Mindy Kaling, a Dartmouth graduate, has been involved from the beginning in the production of the American series of The Office, having originally been the only female writer on a staff of eight; since the show's eighth season she has been an executive producer. She has since created her own show, The Mindy Project which she produces, writes, and stars in.

James Wong, a Hong Kong-born writer raised in the US, was a writer, co-executive producer and consulting producer of The X-Files in its first, second and fourth seasons (1993–1997); co-creator, producer and writer of the TV series Space: Above and Beyond (1995–1996); and writer, consulting producer and co-executive producer of Millennium in its first and second seasons (1996–1998). Before The X-Files, Wong had worked as a writer on police dramas such as 21 Jump Street, The Commish, Booker and Wiseguy as well as on the script for the independent crime film The Boys Next Door (1984), starring Charlie Sheen in his first leading role.

Wong later wrote, produced and directed horror and action films such as Final Destination (2000) and the Jet Li-starring The One (2001), and he was hired by 20th Century Fox to direct Dragonball Evolution (2009), although like other producers and crew members on that production, complained of having little creative input as the studio made all the major decisions.

Jenny Han is a Korean-American writer and producer of the Amazon Prime series The Summer I Turned Pretty, which is also a #1 New York Times bestselling young-adult romance novel trilogy she authored.

=== Television channels ===
In 2007, Myx TV became the first Asian American music, entertainment and lifestyle network.

== Fashion design ==
Many Asian Americans have made their mark in the fashion world. Vera Wang, friend to Anna Wintour, and Anna Sui have been working as highly accomplished and awarded fashion designers for years. Philippine-born Monique Lhuillier's dresses are on the Hollywood red carpet and Vietnamese-American Chloe Dao won Project Runway in spring 2006. Other designers include Phillip Lim, 2006 CFDA Emerging Talent Award Winner Doo-Ri Chung, and 2005 Winner Derek Lam; all three have been featured in Vogue magazine several times. Sandy Liang and her eponymous brand have found cult success, particularly in New York City, and have been compared to Miu Miu and Supreme. At the Fashion Institute of Technology, 23 percent of the nearly 1,200 students now enrolled are either Asian or Asian American. In 2023, the Netflix reality series Bling Empire: New York featured Asian American socialites including celebrity jewelry designer Lynn Ban, who was originally from Singapore.

== Internet ==
With the advent of YouTube, young Asian Americans have become more prominent, gaining large followings through filmmaking, comedy, or music. This includes video bloggers/comedians such as The Fung Brothers, Kevin Wu, Anna Akana, Ryan Higa, Eugene Lee Yang of The Try Guys and the filmmaking group Wong Fu Productions. The latter's growing influence is evident especially in Wong Fu Productions' annual concert series, International Secret Agents (ISA), which often sell out, and in which many popular Asian American guest performers appear, including Far East Movement or Poreotics. Kevin Wu's recent appearance on the 17th season of The Amazing Race marked another significant venture into mainstream media. These along with other rising Asian American talents have shared and documented their journey in Asian American blogs, including channelAPA.com Amped Asia magazine, Hyphen magazine, and Mochi.

Raks Geek, founded by Chinese/Singaporean American Dawn Xiana Moon, is a majority Asian-American bellydance and fire performance company best known for their bellydancing Wookiee viral video and other cosplay/nerd-themed dance work. The group's diverse roster features Hmong and Filipino performers as well, and most have performed around the world.

Brothers Jimmy Wong and Freddie Wong also own popular YouTube channels, with the former acting in and the latter producing the web series Video Game High School.

Mark Edward Fischbach is another example of a popular Asian American on YouTube. His YouTube channel and name online, Markiplier, is dedicated to gaming videos and comedy. With about 20 million subscribers and his channel reaching about 9 billion total views, Markiplier's internet fame has helped him raise over 3 million dollars for charity. In 2016, Markiplier won the Make-A-Wish Foundation's celebrity of the year award alongside voice actor Tom Kenny and the Dallas Cowboys football team. Fischbach will be making his feature directorial debut in late January 2025 with the release of the film Iron Lung, which was directed, written, and financed by himself. Production began in April 2023, and is based on the 2022 horror game Iron Lung.

Emily Sim, born August 27, 1995, who goes by Emirichu online, is a Korean-American storytime YouTuber who is most famous for her animations. She talks about her experience growing up Asian American in quite a few videos. On June 28, 2020, she had uploaded a video called “My Asian-American identity crisis” where she talks about her struggles to accept her background growing up.

Stand-up comedian Catherine Chen (Cat Ce) created a podcast with a variety of guests called Cat Jam in the Car. Some of the guests included:

- Los Angeles Lakers owner Johnny Buss
- Television personality Jenn Sterger
- Stand-up comedian Craig Shoemaker
- Chinese Australian actress Shuang Hu

Stephanie Soo is an internet journalist who runs three YouTube channels: Stephanie Soo, Rotten Mango, and MissMangoButt. Best known for her true crime podcast, Rotten Mango, in which she covers various true crime cases and notably, the trial of Sean Combs in 2025.

== Literature ==
Asian American writers have received numerous top awards in fiction and nonfiction writing.

Women writers have been particularly prominent for their work of telling a wide range of stories of immigrant experience, changing cultures and aspects of Asian American imagination, spanning continents, eras and points of view. Maxine Hong Kingston won the National Book Critics Circle Award in 1976 for her memoir The Woman Warrior. Michi Weglyn received the Anisfield-Wolf Book Award in 1977. Hisaye Yamamoto received an American Book Award for Lifetime Achievement in 1986. Bharati Mukherjee won the National Book Critics Circle Award in 1988 for her short story collection The Middleman and Other Stories. Amy Tan has received popular acclaim for The Joy Luck Club which was adapted into a critically acclaimed film. Jessica Hagedorn received a 1990 American Book Award for her novel Dogeaters. Karen Tei Yamashita was named the recipient of the National Book Foundation's Medal for Distinguished Contribution to American Letters in 2021.

Asian American writers have also received several awards for both children's and young-adult fiction. Taro Yashima won the Children's Book Award in 1955 for his book Crow Boy. Linda Sue Park, Cynthia Kadohata, Erin Entrada Kelly, and Tae Keller received the Newbery Medal for A Single Shard, Kira-Kira, Hello, Universe, and When You Trap a Tiger, respectively. Thanhha Lai received the National Book Award for Young People's Literature for the verse novel Inside Out & Back Again, Kadohata received the award for The Thing About Luck, and Malinda Lo received the award for Last Night at the Telegraph Club

Several writers have received the Hemingway Foundation/PEN Award for best debut book of fiction, including Chang-Rae Lee for the novel Native Speaker, Ha Jin for the short story collection Ocean of Words, Jhumpa Lahiri for the short story collection Interpreter of Maladies, Akhil Sharma for the novel An Obedient Father, Yiyun Li for the short story collection A Thousand Years of Good Prayers, and Weike Wang for the novel Chemistry. Further, Jin received the National Book Award for Fiction for his novel Waiting and Lahiri received a 2000 Pulitzer Prize for Fiction for her Interpreter of Maladies. Viet Thanh Nguyen received the 2016 Pulitzer Prize for Fiction for The Sympathizer. Charles Yu received the 2020 National Book Award for Fiction for Interior Chinatown.

Major films have been based on Asian American novels, such as Jhumpa Lahiri's The Namesake (2007) and Amy Tan's The Joy Luck Club. Others have been created based on stories about Asian American communities.

Early notable writers include "1.5 Generation" who spent their early childhoods or young adult lives outside of the United States. Writers include Bryan Thao Worra, Bao Phi and Anida Yoeu Ali.

Kumail Nanjiani, a Pakistani American, co-wrote the romantic comedy The Big Sick, a film in which he also starred as the eponymous male lead. He received a nomination for the Academy Award for Best Original Screenplay for his efforts.

Lin Yutang and his work "Chinatown Family" strays from the film representation of Asian Americans and attempts to depict the accurate representation of Asian Americans during the 1950s. Lin's works were considered Orientalist, seeing as they were a polar opposite to the style of most Asian American writers after 1965. Yet, Lin's works are still ignored when studying the history of Asian American genealogy and subjectivity.

Throughout the 1990s there was a growing amount of Asian American queer writings and today the list of contributing writers is long. To name a few: Merle Woo (1941), Russell Leong (1950), Dwight Okita (1958), Norman Wong (1963), Chay Yew (1965), and Justin Chin (1969).

In 2025 Arthur Sze became the first Asian American United States Poet Laureate.

== Music ==
=== Rock ===
William David Chin, nicknamed "Charlie Chin", was the guitarist for Cat Mother's & the All Night Newsboys. His nickname, "Chop Chop" or "Charlie", was given to him as one of the only children of Asian kid on Upper East Side. In the Rolling Stone, Ben Fong-Torres wrote that he was "the only Chinese in rock" at the time.

In addition, late guitarist Eddie Van Halen is a renowned musician with Asian roots; his mother was of Indonesian ethnic origin.

John Myung of the progressive metal band Dream Theater is considered an important metal bassists on account of his complex playing styles and harmonics.

James Yoshinobu Iha (井葉吉伸, Iha Yoshinobu) is a Japanese-American rock guitarist best known as a member of the alternative rock band the Smashing Pumpkins.

Chi Cheng a Chinese American was the late original bassist for the critically acclaimed experimental metal band Deftones. He is well known for playing unconventional bass lines in metal arrangements particularly their most popular single "Change" which features a reggae/dub bass line. The Deftones lead singer Chino Moreno is also part Chinese as well and is known for his ethereal and haunting vocal styles.

=== Hip hop and R&B ===
Christopher "Fresh Kid Ice" Wong Won is noted for being the first Asian American rapper noticed in hip hop. When his group 2 Live Crew started to gain traction in the mid- to late 1980s, Wong Won noted that many fans had no clue that he was Asian until the group's music videos were released. When asked about Asians in hip hop in the early days, Wong Won mentioned that most of his Asian peers were involved in either disc jockeying or breakdancing.

Chad Hugo a Filipino-American makes up one half of the Neptunes alongside his partner Pharrell Williams

Asian Americans are increasingly enjoying success in mainstream hip hop and R&B such as MC Jin. A few notable examples are multi-racial Amerie, Cassie, Jhené Aiko, Ne-Yo, who is one-quarter Chinese, Filipino-American Nicole Scherzinger who is of Filipino, Hawaiian, and Ukrainian descent, apl.de.ap of The Black Eyed Peas, H.E.R. who is half-Filipino, and Jin. There are many more Asian Americans represented in local hip-hop scenes, including rising acts like Baiyu and the Blue Scholars. The Asian American actress Awkwafina also started her entertainment career as a viral internet rapper. In 2010 and 2011, half-Filipino singer-songwriter Bruno Mars broke into the Top 10 with his singles "Just the Way You Are" and "Grenade". In 2018, he became the second unaccompanied Asian American artist to win the Grammy Award for Album of the Year. In October 2010, Far East Movement became the first Asian American band to break into the Top 10 of the Billboard Hot 100 with their single "Like a G6", which eventually reached No. 1. Jay Park's fourth album "Everything You Wanted", released in 2016, charted at #3 on Billboard's World album chart as well as #3 on iTune's U.S. R&B chart. Hawaii's Jason Tom perpetuates the hip hop vocal art of beatboxing and is ranked as one of the top 150 professional vocal percussion artists in the world. In 2015, media company 88rising was founded and Dumbfoundead and Rich Brian, along with other Asian rappers, are signed to this record label.

=== Desi hip hop ===
There are also major underground hip hop artists who have developed a following, such as the Pakistani American rapper Bohemia who is known as the creator of Punjabi rap music.

There is a genre of music called Desi hip hop due to its contributions and influences by many nations including the US by the South Asian diaspora including South Asian Americans especially by pioneers such as Pakistani-American Bohemia himself. Desi hip hop is one of only two music genres to have been either created by Asian Americans or have been contributed to musically by the community (in this case South Asian Americans) to the genre.

=== Asian American jazz ===
Asian American jazz is a musical genre and movement in the United States begun in the 20th century by Asian American jazz musicians that has produced a number of very prominent artists. Along with Desi Hip Hop who has many origins including the US it is currently one of only two musical genres to have been created by Asian Americans or been influenced by them. Some Asian-American Jazz artists are Toshiko Akiyoshi (piano), Vijay Iyer (piano), Rudresh Mahanthappa (alto saxophone), Jon Jang (piano), Tiger Okoshi (trumpet), Yasushi Nakamura (bass), Connie Han (piano), Joey Alexander (piano) and Hitomi Oba (tenor saxophone).

Jazz musician Charles Mingus, whose mother was descended from a Chinese national, was influential in American jazz.

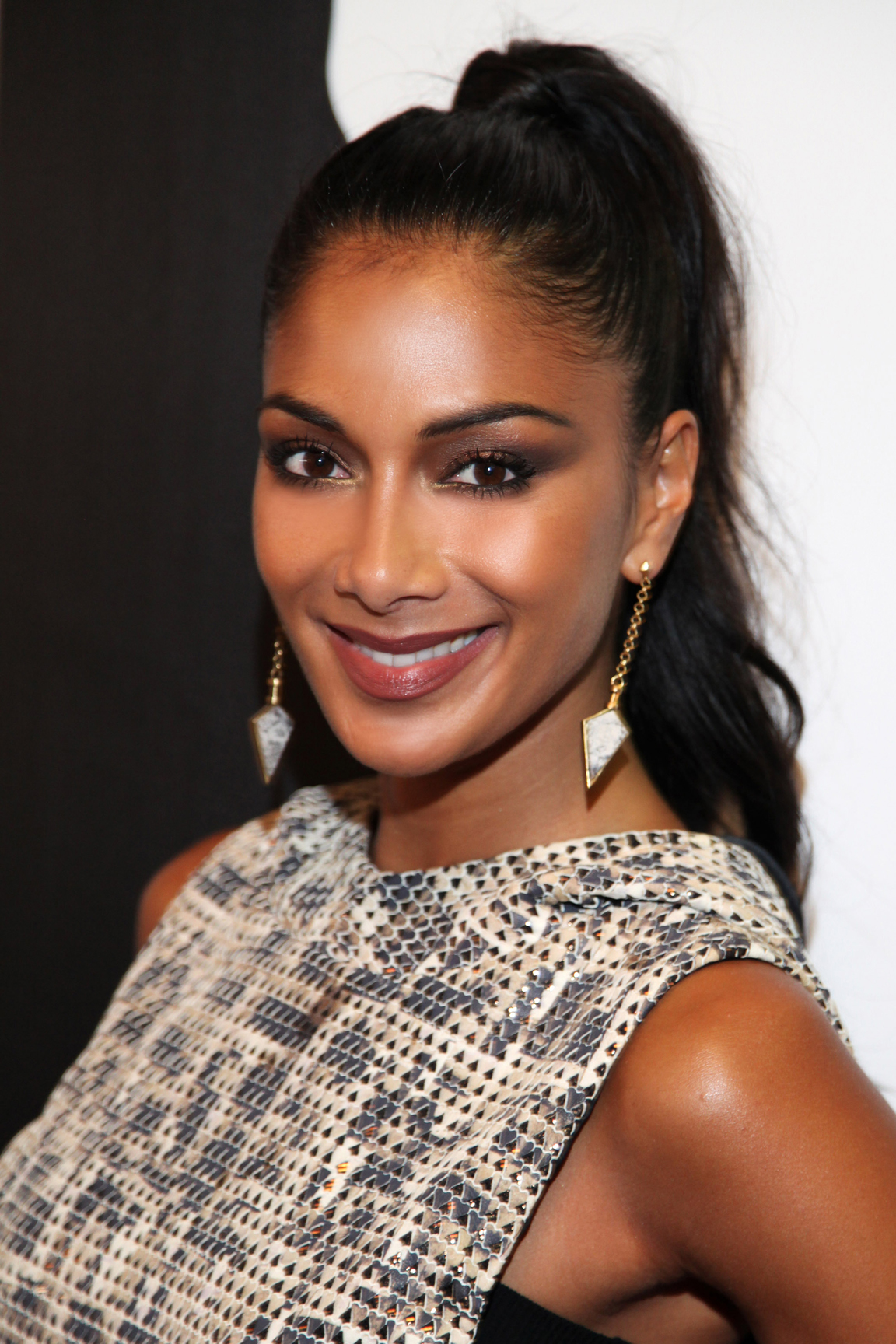
Nicole Scherzinger (2012) is a Filipino American singer.

=== Popular music ===
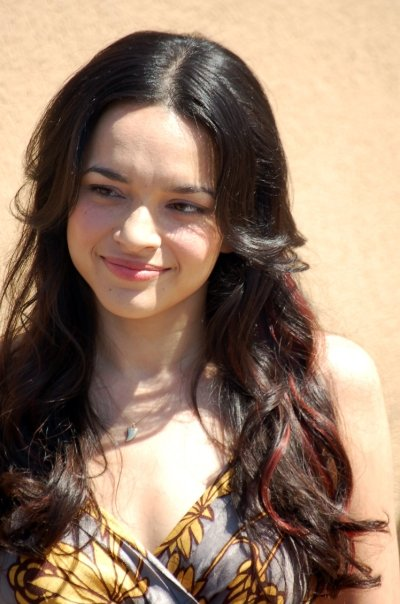
Norah Jones is an Indian American Grammy Award-winning singer, songwriter, pianist, keyboardist, guitarist, and actress.

In popular music, Asian Americans are a sizable influence, including pop divas such as part-Filipinos Olivia Rodrigo, Vanessa Hudgens, Nicole Scherzinger, and Bruno Mars

Folk singer-songwriter and Dawn Xiana Moon was the first to blend traditional Chinese music with Americana, pop, and jazz in the mid-2000s, and Vienna Teng is notable for a folk pop without the Eastern influences.

Asian Americans play in a handful of "all-American" bands, including quarter-Indonesian Eddie Van Halen, James Iha of The Smashing Pumpkins, Korean American bassist and a founding member of the progressive metal group Dream Theater John Myung, Keralan Indian Kim Thayil of Soundgarden, Karen O the Korean American lead vocalist of rock band Yeah Yeah Yeahs, part-Filipino Kirk Hammett of Metallica, Japanese-born Satomi Matsuzaki, bassist and vocalist of experimental rock band Deerhoof, Korean American JinJoo Lee, guitarist of the dance-rock band DNCE, Kazu Makino the Japanese-American singer and guitarist of the indie rock band Blonde Redhead, Japanese bassist and singer Toko Yasuda of Enon, Cambodian-born singer Chhom Nimol of Dengue Fever, Dustin Wong from Ponytail, Indian Tony Kanal of No Doubt, half-Japanese Miki Berenyi of Lush, John Famiglietti of HEALTH, Richard On of O.A.R., Joey Santiago of Pixies, Kenny Choi of Daphne Loves Derby, Hoobastank's Doug Robb and former member Derek Kwan, and Linkin Park's Mike Shinoda a Japanese American and Joseph Hahn, a Korean American. The main vocalist of American independent electronic music duo Knower Genevieve Artadi is Filipino American. Mike Park is prominent in the independent music sphere as a member of Skankin' Pickle, The Bruce Lee Band, and The Chinkees, as well as being the founder of Asian Man Records.

Don Ho was a Grammy Award-winning Hawaiian pop singer and entertainer. Tia Carrere is a Hawaiian singer, actress, and former model best known as Cassandra Wong in the Wayne's World movies and for her leading role on the television series Relic Hunter; her album Hawaiiana was nominated for a Grammy. Grammy Award-winning singer-songwriter Norah Jones is also included among notable Asian American performers. Nadia Ali, singer-songwriter and the former front-woman of iiO is prominent in the electronic dance music genre, with her work having attained both critical and commercial success. Rising pop artist Conan Gray who became viral on TikTok in 2020 is also Japanese-American.

Debuting as a 16-year-old independent singer-songwriter in 2018, Joseph Samuels has focused on concepts of populism, Asian culture, internet culture, celebrity culture, consumerism, post-postmodernism, and other social music phenomena.

Internationally, US-born Leehom Wang is a well-known musician in mainland China and Taiwan, and also played a part in Ang Lee's 2007 film Lust, Caution. In the heavy metal genre, Aja Kim, has achieved notoriety as lead vocalist in the role of Bruce 'Lee' Chickinson for the tribute band, The Iron Maidens. Also US-born is singer Ailee, whose captivating voice caught the attention of Korean R&B singer, Wheesung. Her vocal prowess and captivating voice won her many awards and is the reason she is dubbed the "Korean Beyonce."

There are also bands like the indie pop duo Cibo Matto, Run River North that plays folk-influenced rock and The Slants, that make pop-rock and are best known for their landmark trademark case against the United States Patent and Trademark Office.

The popular mass media company 88rising was also founded by Asian-American Sean Miyashiro with the mission to increase Asian and Asian American representation in mainstream media and music.

=== Indie music ===
There are also many Asian American artists gaining success in the indie music scene. This includes Japanese-American indie rock singer-songwriter Mitski, Korean-American Michelle Zauner who is the musician behind Japanese Breakfast, Chinese-American singer-songwriter and YouTuber mxmtoon, Vietnamese-American singer, songwriter, and producer Casey Luong who releases lo-fi music under the stage name keshi, and half-Japanese R&B artist UMI.

=== Classical ===
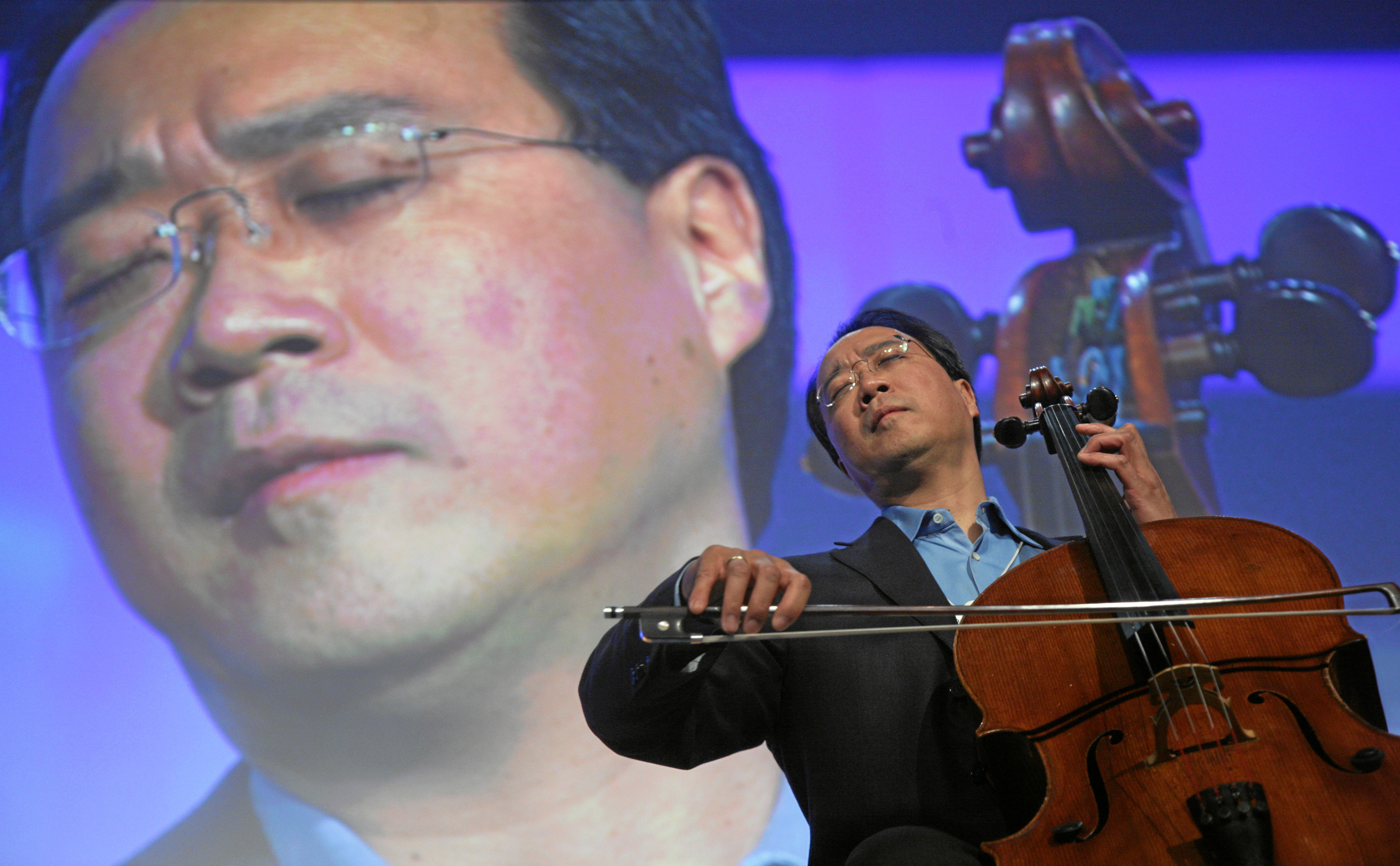
Yo-Yo Ma, world-renowned cellist

In classical music, cellist Yo-Yo Ma, conductor Zubin Mehta, and violinist Anne Akiko Meyers are among the many examples of significant Asian American figures. The classical violinists Sarah Chang and Midori Gotō have each been awarded the prestigious Avery Fisher Prize, as has Ma. The composer Bright Chang has received extensive recognition for his work, including being invited to be composer-in-residence at the New York City Ballet. Hunan, China-born New York City resident Tan Dun is a contemporary classical composer, known for his Grammy and Oscar-award-winning scores for the movies Crouching Tiger, Hidden Dragon and Hero.

== Fine arts ==
=== Painting ===
Asian American art is one of the last genres to be added to modern day collections; however, many notable painters have drawn inspiration from art techniques of Asian-origin. In the 19th century, painters like Whistler and Van Gogh used various Japanese works as models for their artwork. At the same time, many Japanese painters were moving to California to blend their work with what would become new Western Techniques. Asian American art can mostly be traced back to the West Coast with artists also popping up in New York.

Tyrus Wong (1910–2016), who emigrated to the US from China, is considered to be one of the influential artists of the 20th century. He was a muralist for the Works Progress Administration. As well as having been a production illustrator for films such as Bambi (1942), some of his paintings are now or have been exhibited in art museums. Examples include Deer on Cliff (1960s) and The Cove (1960s) which had been exhibited at the Armand Hammer Museum. When he was about two years old, the last imperial dynasty of China, the Qing Dynasty, had come to an end.

Paul Horiuchi was a Japanese-born American painter best known for his abstract collages of torn, hand-colored mulberry paper. Active in Seattle, he created the glass mural behind the Seattle Center amphitheater in 1962.

Indian-American Faris McReynolds is a Los Angeles-based artist and musician. Sueo Serisawa helped establish the California Impressionist style of painting. Los Angeles-based artists James Jean and David Choe have received domestic and international recognition within the Lowbrow art scene.

Martin Wong was a San Francisco and New York-based queer painter that made notable contributions to the 1980s East Village art scene. Wong was also involved with the growing New York graffiti art scene of this time and collected pieces from artists like Futura 2000 and Keith Haring.

Japanese Internment Camps following WWII put a halt to a lot of Asian American artists. Art that resulted from this time serves as some of the only documentation of the trials and tribulations of the many Japanese Americans who were forced into camps.

Roger Shimomura is a painter and printmaker whose works combine pop culture motifs, racial stereotypes, and evocations of his childhood experiences in the Minidoka internment camp during World War II.

Abstract expressionism exploded onto the scene in the 1950s, drawing inspiration from calligraphy.

=== Sculpture ===
Isamu Noguchi was one of the most important American sculptors of the 20th century. Born in Los Angeles to a Japanese poet father and American writer mother, he spent most of his childhood in Japan, and his drew both from traditional Japanese aesthetics and international modernism. He worked many mediums, including clay, wood, and stainless steel, but is particularly associated with stone. In 1935 he began a career-long collaboration with dancer Martha Graham for whom he designed some 20 stage sets. Major works include the Unesco headquarters peace garden in Paris, the Sunken Garden for the Beinecke Library at Yale University, and the Billy Rose Sculpture Garden for the Israeli Museum in Jerusalem.

George Tsutakawa was a Seattle-based painter and sculptor best known for his avant-garde bronze fountain designs. His son Gerard Tsutakawa, who apprenticed with his father, is a contemporary Pacific Northwest sculptor.

=== Curating ===
Irene Mei Zhi Shum is a contemporary art curator, arts executive based in New York City, and cofounder of the Williamsburg Biannual.

Joseph Samuels is the founder of the Bird Foundation, a non-profit organization that raises funds for the purpose of educating and saving children and women.

Herb Tam is the curator and director of exhibitions at the Museum of Chinese in America.

=== Book arts ===
Colette Fu is a pop-up book artist who designed China's largest pop-up book. She was awarded a Fulbright Fellowship to create a pop-up book of the 25 ethnic minorities residing in Yunnan Province, China, from where her family descends.

=== Architecture ===
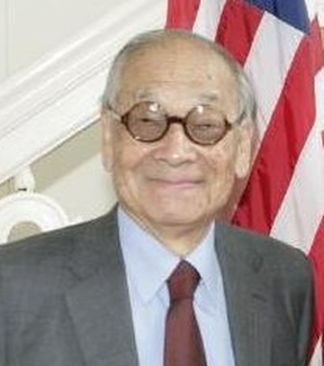
I. M. Pei, world-renowned architect

Notable works of world architecture have been designed by Asian Americans, such as the Louvre Pyramid (I. M. Pei), the World Trade Center (Minoru Yamasaki), and the Vietnam Veterans Memorial (Maya Lin). In commercial architecture, Gyo Obata is a founding partner of HOK (formerly Hellmuth, Obata + Kassabaum), which designed the National Air and Space Museum in Washington D.C. and the Taipei World Trade Center. Fazlur Rahman Khan designed the John Hancock Center and the Willis Tower (formerly Sears Tower), both in Chicago.

Goil Amornvivat is an architect and television personality who provides commentary on architecture and design. His television work has been driven by the desire to raise visibility of Asians in America and broaden Asian male identity.

=== Graphic artists ===
Larry Hama is best known as the original writer of the Marvel Comics GI Joe series. When he went to DC comics in the 1970s, he upended the long-standing tradition of coloring Asian characters yellow by confronting the head of the production department.

Jim Lee is a comic book artist and one of the founders of Image Comics. He is currently the Chief Creative Officer of DC Comics along with its publisher. He has created comic books featuring Batman, Superman, X-Men, and more.

Dave Halili (of Japanese, Filipino, Chinese, Pacific Islander and European heritage) is a contemporary American fine arts illustrator, graffiti writer and graphic designer of album cover paintings, posters, logos, T-shirts and other graphical merchandise. His best-known works are the album & CD /record covers for Ice-T and tour apparel for bands such as No Doubt, Stone Temple Pilots, Kurtis Blow, Fishbone and others.

Asian Americans are gaining prominence in Los Angeles, the "Mural Capital of the World", including Nisha Sembi, Lady Aiko, Hueman, and Erin Yoshi.

Lady Aiko is a well-known street artist who started out working for Takashi Murakami in Brooklyn until the late 1990s. She has international works installed in many cities including Miami's Wynwood Walls in 2009, New York City's Bowery Wall in 2013 and Coney Art Walls in 2015, 2016 and 2017.

Gene Luen Yang is a Chinese-American cartoonist who has written many children's graphic novels such Dragon Hoops, Secret Coders, and American Born Chinese, which was adapted into a Disney+ series.

=== Fine Art Institutions ===
LA Artcore, an art foundation in Los Angeles in the artist district of Los Angeles and in Little Tokyo as well, was founded by Lydia Takeshita. Lydia Takeshita lived part of her youth in the Japanese internment camps of 1942. As a former tenured professor at California State University, Los Angeles, she used her retirement years to work full-time to run LA Artcore, which she founded with the help of her former students. Her efforts were greatly appreciated in the Los Angeles Artist District and the art community in Los Angeles. She and her foundation helped to create the artist district, and she stood up for the rights of local residents there when they were at risk of losing their homes. LA Artcore moved the Union Center for the Arts building in 1998, and its neighbor in the building was the Asian American theater company East West Players.

== Portrayal of Asian Americans in media ==
=== Dragon Lady and Lotus Blossom dichotomy ===
Asian American characters and their representation in mainstream media, especially in the film and entertainment industry, are often one-dimensional and lacking in depth. East Asian Americans in the film and media industry are often fetishized and exoticized, perpetuating damaging images of Asian women as either the "dragon lady" or "lotus flower" dichotomy. An example is Lucy Liu's dragon lady character O-Ren Ishii in Kill Bill, as well as Anna May Wong's character in Daughter of the Dragon. According to author Kent Ono, "Usually yellow peril discourse constructs and Asian-white dialectic emphasizing the powerful, threatening potential of Asians and Asian Americans, while simultaneously constructing whites as vulnerable, threatened, or otherwise in danger." These limiting and offensive roles offered to Asian Americans further the US's exoticism and fetishism of Asian women, leading to terms such as "yellow fever". According to Rosalind S. Chou in her book, Asian American Sexual Politics: The Construction of Race, Gender, and Sexuality, stereotypical portrayals of Asian Americans which lead to phenomenon's such as yellow fever can be particularly damaging to real life interracial relationships where she writes "it can be difficult to distinguish genuine interest from interest resting on fabricated constructions of an othered person." South Asian portrayal in cinema often involve "Kama Sutra" type analogies or imagery, an example being white actor Mike Myers and his role as Pitka in the movie The Love Guru.

=== Model minority ===
In The New York Times Magazine in January 1966, "Success Story, Japanese-American Style", the term "model minority" was coined by sociologist William Petersen. It was used in order to describe Japanese Americans as ethnic minorities who, despite marginalization, have achieved success in the United States. While it was first used to depict Japanese Americans, it has since evolved to characterize Asian Americans in general, specifically East Asians (i.e. Chinese, Japanese, and Korean) and the South Asian community. However, this concept has faced major criticism from the Asian American community. According to Asian Americans Advancing Justice - Los Angeles, "the misperception that Asian Americans are doing fine on their own has serious policy implications... politicians won't talk about our community's needs if they assume people don't require assistance."

This stereotype is often portrayed in media, such as television and film. Characters such as George Huang in Law & Order: SVU, Cristina Yang in Grey's Anatomy, and Archie Kao in CSI: Crime Scene Investigation are all examples of this. In addition, in the second edition of her book, Unraveling the Model Minority Stereotype: Listening to Asian American Youth, Professor Stacy J. Lee argues that the ostensibly sterling stereotype was constructed to silence the charges of racial inequality and to delegitimize the protests of racial discrimination. Bob H. Suzuki also questions the validity of the stereotype, contending that it is only media hype, more myth than reality. Suzuki further argued that, deceptively flattering and favorable on the surface, the model minority stereotype is inaccurate, overgeneralized, and a liability for Asian Americans. The commendation of Asian Americans as a model minority implicitly denigrates other racial groups as well.

== See also ==
- Portrayal of East Asians in American film and theater
- Asian-American theatre
- Asian American Dance Theatre
- Asian American Arts Centre
- Dragon Lady
- List of Asian Academy Award winners and nominees
- Asian Americans in broadcast journalism
