= Lí (surname 黎) =

Chinese family name

Li (黎)
- Li in Chinese character
- Language: Chinese

Origin
- Language: Old Chinese

Other names
- Variant forms: Lai, Lei
- Derivative: Lê (Vietnamese)

Lí (Chinese: 黎) is a Chinese surname. It mostly appears in Central and South China (including Hong Kong and Macao) where it is transliterated as Lai or Lei (from Cantonese).

It is around the 81st most common in Mainland China.

In Vietnam, it is spelled Lê and is one of the four most common surnames among ethnic Vietnamese people.

It is listed 262nd in the Song dynasty classic Hundred Family Surnames.

Some Hlai people in Hainan Island also use Lí as a surname.

== Origin ==
Around the Yangtze River, any Jiuli (九黎) people got surname Li (黎) as a tribal name. In Ancient China, descendants of Shaohao were surnamed Li on Licheng County (黎城). During the Xia dynasty, descendants of Emperor Yao were surnamed Li (黎) in Licheng County (黎城).

In Vietnam, some Chinese Li (黎) families changed their surname to Vietnamese Hà or Hồ (胡).

== Notable people ==
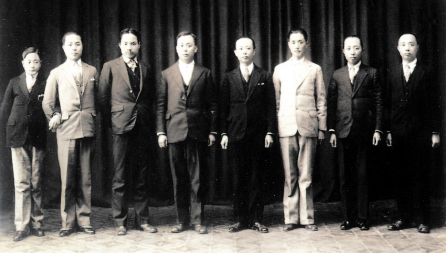
The eight Li brothers

- Leon Lai (黎明), actor and Cantopop singer
- Li Yuanhong, 4th president of the Republic of China
- Jimmy Lai, Hong Kong businessman and politician
- Gigi Lai, singer and TVB actress
- Humberto Lay (黎孙), Peruvian pastor and politician
- Lai Ka Ying, Hong Kong astronaut
- Lai Lok-yi, Hong Kong singer
- Lai Man-Wai, film director
- Newton Lai (黎漢持), Hong Kong actor
- Wayne Lai, Hong Kong actor
- Li Zhaohuan (黎照寰; 1898–1969) President of Shanghai Jiao Tong University
- The eight Li brothers of Xiangtan, including:
  - Li Jinxi (1890–1978)
  - Li Jinhui (1891–1967)
  - Chin Yang Lee (Li Jinyang; 1915–2018), author of novel The Flower Drum Song
- Li Minghui (1909–2003), singer and actress, daughter of Li Jinhui
- Lai Tat-wing a.k.a. Lai Tat Tat Wing, Hong Kong comics artist
- Na Li (黎娜), Chinese and American electrical engineer and applied mathematician

== See also ==
- Lê, Vietnamese version
