= Eight Li brothers =

Distinguished 20th-century Chinese family

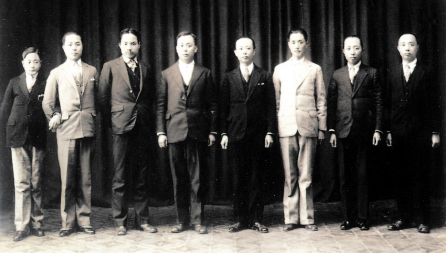
The Eight Li brothers in Beijing, 1930. From right to left (oldest to youngest): Jinxi, Jinhui, Jinyao, Jinshu, Jinjiong, Jinming, Jinguang, Jinyang.

The Eight Li Brothers, also referred to as the Eight Stallions of the Li Family (Chinese: 黎氏八骏), are eight brothers from the Li family of Xiangtan, Hunan, China who lived during the 20th century. They included the linguist Li Jinxi, the musician Li Jinhui, and the novelist Chin Yang Lee (Li Jinyang), who wrote The Flower Drum Song which was adapted into a Broadway musical and an Oscar-nominated Hollywood film Flower Drum Song.

== Background ==
The Li 黎 clan of Xiangtan lived in Hunan Province since the Qing dynasty. Some of its members included: Li Jiyun, Li Peijing, Li Jingsong, Li Liewen and his son Norman N. Li.

The Li brothers were the sons of scholar Li Song'an (黎松安) and his wife Huang Geng (黄赓). Their grandfather, Li Baotang (黎葆堂), was a Qing imperial official. The brothers were all born in their family home in Lingjiao Village, Zhonglupu Town, Xiangtan County. They also had three sisters, who were trained in calligraphy but did not receive the same level of education as the brothers.

== The Eight Brothers ==
The eldest brother, Li Jinxi (黎锦熙; 1890–1978), was a linguist and associate of Mao Zedong, and served as President of Beijing Normal University.

The second brother, Li Jinhui (黎锦晖; 1891–1967), was a songwriter in the shidaiqu genre, founded the Bright Moon Song and Dance Troupe.

The third brother, Li Jinyao (黎锦曜; 1895–1953), was a mining engineer and chief editor of the China Mining Journal (中华矿学杂志). He died in Hainan while prospecting for mining resources.

The fourth brother, Li Jinshu (黎锦纾; 1899–1954), was an educator. He received a Ph.D. from the University of Berlin. Li Jinshu became a Communist Party member in 1925 while studying in Germany. After returning to China, he dedicated himself to the promotion of education among the common people, and published the book The Art of Education.

The fifth brother, Li Jinjiong (黎锦炯; 1901–1981), was a railway and bridge engineer. He designed the Luan River Bridge in 1929 in North China. An engineer in the Ministry of Railways, he participated in the design of the Baoji–Chengdu, Chengdu–Chongqing, and Yingtan–Xiamen railways, as well as the Nanjing and Wuhan Yangtze River Bridges.

The sixth brother, Li Jinming (黎锦明; 1905–1999), was a writer best known for the novel The Shadow of Dust (尘影), one of the first Chinese novels about peasant movements.

The seventh brother, Li Jinguang (黎锦光; 1909–1993), was a composer and songwriter who wrote "Evening Primrose", which was performed by Yoshiko Yamaguchi. He worked in Jinhui's troupe and served for a decade as music editor at Pathé Records.

The eighth and youngest brother, Li Jinyang (黎锦扬; 1915–2018), known in the West as Chin Yang (C.Y.) Lee, was an author who wrote the 1957 novel The Flower Drum Song, about Chinese immigrants in the United States. It was adapted into the Broadway musical Flower Drum Song and the eponymous 1961 film which was nominated for five Academy Awards. He was the only Li brother who settled abroad. He died just short of his 103rd birthday.

== Legacy ==
The family home of the Li brothers in Lingjiao, Xiangtan, is preserved as a protected historic site of Hunan.
