= Fengyang Flower Drum =

Chinese traditional folk song

Fengyang Flower Drum (simplified Chinese: 凤阳花鼓; traditional Chinese: 鳳陽花鼓; pinyin: Fèng yáng huāgǔ) is a traditional Chinese folk song, a form of Quyi, from Fengyang County, Anhui Province that was developed during the late Ming Dynasty. Originally, it was performed by two seated female singers (usually sisters-in-law). It was typically performed in public for gratuities, as Fengyang County was prone to flooding from the Yellow River.

== History ==
Fengyang Flower Drum by Teresa Teng (1967).

The Fengyang Flower Drum song was associated with beggars from Fengyang County which experienced a disastrous series of flood and drought during the late Ming Dynasty, forcing residents to sing for money. It is classed as one of the speech-song (说唱; Shuōchàng) folk arts of Quyi.

The form was popularized by its appearance in The Good Earth, the 1937 film adaptation of a novel by Pearl S. Buck. Chou Wen-Chung, an American emigrant from China, incorporated it into his 1949 composition Landscapes.

== See also ==
- The Flower Drum Song (novel)
  - Flower Drum Song (musical)
  - Flower Drum Song (film)
