= Mark Shaw (photographer) =

American photographer

- Born: Mark Schlossman; June 25, 1921; New York City, New York, U.S.
- Died: January 26, 1969 (aged 47); New York City, U.S.
- Education: New York University; Pratt Institute
- Known for: Photography, film and television advertisement
- Spouses: Geri Trotta (m. 1949; div. 1960) Pat Suzuki (m. 1960; div. 1965)
- Patrons: Kennedy family
- Website: markshawphoto.com

Mark Shaw (June 25, 1921 – January 26, 1969) was an American fashion and celebrity photographer in the 1950s and 1960s. He worked for Life magazine from 1952 to 1968, during which time 27 issues of Life carried cover photos by Shaw. Shaw's work also appeared in Esquire, Harper's Bazaar, Mademoiselle, and many other publications. He is best known for his photographs of John F. Kennedy, his wife Jacqueline Kennedy, and their children, Caroline and John F. Kennedy Jr. In 1964, many of these images were published in the book The John F. Kennedys: A Family Album, which became a bestseller.

== Early life ==
Shaw was born Mark Schlossman to working-class parents of Eastern European heritage in New York City and grew up on the Lower East Side. His mother Rebecca (or Reva) Silverstein (also Kanzer) (1895–1960) was a seamstress of Russian and Polish extraction; his father Joseph Charles Schlossman was a laborer and/or salesman of Austrian descent. They divorced while Mark was still a boy. Later he attended New York University, where he studied industrial design, and Pratt Institute, where he studied engineering and likely was exposed to photography as well.

In December 1941, Shaw completed ROTC training with a lieutenant's commission. A month after the attack on Pearl Harbor, he enlisted in the U.S. Army Air Force as Mark Schlossman, recording his occupation at enlistment as "photographer". He served as a pilot throughout World War II, and was highly decorated, flying fighters with the British forces in the North African Campaign and later flying transports over The Hump from India to China. Due to his expertise with multiengine planes, he was then assigned to Russian General Georgy Zhukov as his personal pilot. Shaw also flew one of the escort planes accompanying General Douglas MacArthur on his way to Tokyo to accept the Japanese surrender.

At some point during or soon after the war, Mark (and his mother) changed their surname (Schlossman) to "Shaw", probably in order to sound more "American", which was a common motivation for name changes at the time.

== Career ==
After the war, Shaw began his professional photography career in New York City, managing the photographic studio at Harper's Bazaar, where he came under the influence and mentorship of art director Alexey Brodovitch. From 1946 to 1948, Shaw did fashion photography for Harper's Bazaar and began acquiring advertising clients as well.

In 1949, Shaw married Geraldine "Geri" Trotta, who was a professional fashion and travel writer for several publications including Mademoiselle. The couple bought a brownstone on the East side of midtown Manhattan. Shaw established his photography studio in a carriage house behind their home. Starting in 1951, Shaw contributed fashion images to Mademoiselle.

In 1952, Shaw became a freelance photographer for Life magazine and preferred freelancing throughout his career so that he could retain the rights to all of his work—a goal which he was able to achieve even with his most famous images. Trotta's connections further expanded Mark's access to celebrities and public figures, and his career flourished. Freelancing on over 100 assignments for Life, Shaw photographed many actresses, actors, politicians, and other celebrities, while also frequently working photo shoots in the fashion industry. He was the first photographer to portray the Paris fashion collections backstage in color.

In 1953, probably because of his fashion experience, Shaw was assigned to photograph the young actress Audrey Hepburn during the filming of Paramount's Sabrina. Evasive at first, Hepburn became comfortable with Shaw's presence over a two-week period and allowed him to record many of her casual and private moments. This produced some of his best-known images, though most of the negatives were subsequently lost for many years. Life published several of these photos in the December 7, 1953 issue, which also carried a Shaw cover of Hepburn.

The revealing, true-to-life photos that Mark took of Audrey are typical of his work and his photographic philosophy. He called his favorite pictures "snapshots." He preferred shooting on location to shooting in a studio—even though most of his financial success came from big ad campaigns, much of which was studio work. He liked a natural look and in order to keep his subjects relaxed he worked with as little photographic equipment as possible.

— Juliet Cuming, Charmed by Audrey: Life on the Set of Sabrina

Also during the 1950s, Shaw and fellow fashion and portrait photographer Richard Avedon contributed concurrently to a well-known, long-running ad campaign for Vanity Fair lingerie. Shaw won numerous Art Directors Club awards for his creative images in this campaign.

By the late 1950s, Shaw's career was reaching its zenith. Among the famous figures he photographed were Brigitte Bardot, Cary Grant, Danny Kaye, Grace Kelly, Nico, Pablo Picasso, Yves St. Laurent, Elizabeth Taylor, and many others. For example, in 1957 Shaw portrayed fashion designer Coco Chanel, actress Jeanne Moreau, and model Suzy Parker during a single shoot in Chanel's Paris apartment and fashion house. Life published several of these photos with a story on Chanel that appeared in the issue of August 19, 1957 (which was also Chanel's birthday).

In 1959, Life chose Shaw to photograph Jacqueline Kennedy while her husband, Senator John F. Kennedy, was running for president. This assignment was the beginning of an enduring working relationship and personal friendship with the Kennedys that would eventually lead to Shaw's acceptance as the Kennedys' de facto "family photographer". He visited them at the White House and at Hyannisport; during this time he produced his most famous photographs, portraying the couple and their children in both official and casual settings. In 1964, Shaw published a collection of these images in his book The John F. Kennedys: A Family Album, which was very successful.

Late in his career Shaw also worked in film, directing numerous television commercials for major companies.

== Personal life ==
In 1960, Shaw and his first wife Geri Trotta divorced. He and singer Pat Suzuki married on March 28, 1960. They had a son, David, two years later, and divorced in February 1965.

== Death ==
On January 26, 1969, Shaw died at his New York City apartment. His death was initially reported as a heart attack. An autopsy later revealed that Shaw had died of "acute and chronic intravenous amphetamine poisoning". At the time of his death, Shaw was being treated by physician Dr. Max Jacobson. Nicknamed "Dr. Feelgood" and "Miracle Max", Jacobson administered "vitamin shots" that consisted of a mixture of multivitamins, steroids, animal organ cells, hormones, placenta, bone marrow, and high doses of amphetamine to a number of high-profile celebrity clients. Shaw's death drew attention to Jacobson's practice which was publicly exposed in the media in December 1972. Jacobson eventually lost his medical license in 1975.

== Legacy ==
Following Shaw's death, his estate, including his large body of photographic work, passed to his ex-wives. In 1994, Shaw's son David Shaw and his wife Juliet Cuming took over management of Mark Shaw's photographic legacy and later purchased Geri Trotta's share of the collection. In 1999, they established the Mark Shaw Photographic Archive, in East Dummerston, Vermont, which is now the sole legal proprietor of Mark Shaw images.

Prior to founding the Archive, David Shaw had a career as a film and music video cinematographer, and Juliet Cuming directed music videos (including White Zombie's "Thunder Kiss '65"). They have two children. The couple also operate a nonprofit, Earth Sweet Home, which promotes sustainable building and design techniques. The Archive itself is housed in an off-the-grid straw-bale structure which they built themselves following sustainable principles. The building is powered by wind and solar energy.

In December 2005, a few months after Geri Trotta's death, the long-lost negatives from 60 rolls of film Mark Shaw had shot on his 1953 Audrey Hepburn assignment were found in Trotta's residence. Selections from these rediscovered images were published in 2009 in the book Charmed by Audrey: Life on the Set of Sabrina.

== Works ==
=== Notable photographs ===
- Jackie and Caroline on the Beach, Hyannis Port, 1959. Image, notes at Monroe Gallery
- JFK Walking in the Dunes, Hyannis Port, 1959. Image, notes at Monroe Gallery
- Audrey Walking Away, Beverly Hills, 1953. Image, notes at Monroe Gallery
- Audrey Under the Hair Dryer, Paramount Back Lot, 1953. Image, notes at Monroe Gallery
- Coco Lies on Divan, Paris, 1957. Image, notes at Andrew Wilder Gallery
- Vanity Fair Butterfly Robe Arm Out, New York, c. 1955. Image, notes at Andrew Wilder Gallery
- Vanity Fair Sheer Gown, New York, c. 1955. Image, notes at Andrew Wilder Gallery
- White Gown with Pearls, Paris, 1954. Image, notes at Andrew Wilder Gallery
- Henrietta Tiarks, the Dutchess of Bedford, Palais Royale, Paris, 1959. Image, notes at Andrew Wilder Gallery

=== Photographic Books ===
- The John F. Kennedys: A Family Album, Farrar, Straus, 1964.
- Messenger of Peace: The Visit of Pope Paul VI to the United States in the Cause of Peace, Trinity House, 1965. (Editor, photojournal.)
- The Catch and the Feast, Weybright and Talley, 1969. (Photographer; text by Joie McGrail and Bill McGrail. A wild game cookbook.)
- The John F. Kennedys: A Family Album, Rizzoli, 2003. ISBN 978-0-7893-1026-2. (Expanded edition, including new images.)
- Charmed by Audrey: Life on the Set of Sabrina, Palace Press, 2009. ISBN 978-1-933784-87-8. (Text by Juliet Cuming and David Taylor.)
- Dior Glamour: 1952-1962, Rizzoli, 2010. ISBN 978-0847841851. (Photographer; text by Natasha Fraser-Cavassoni)

== Awards ==
- Art Directors Club awards in 1950, 51, 52, 53, 54, 55, 57, 59, 60, 61, 62, and 65 including two gold medals.
- 1957 Art Directors Club - Award of Distinctive Merit, Editorial Art (Magazine Covers) (for Life cover of Rosalind Russell, November 12, 1956)
- 1957 Art Directors Club - Award of Distinctive Merit, Editorial Art (Non-Fiction - Two Colors)
- American Television Commercial Festival (Clio) award: Television/Cinema, Best, 1964: "Night Ride" ad for Breck Shampoo (Director, Cameraman), Young & Rubicam agency, New York.
- American Television Commercial Festival (Clio) award: Television/Cinema, Best, 1964: "Ford Has Changed" ad for Ford Motor Company (Director), J. Walter Thompson agency, New York.
- American Television Commercial Festival (Clio) award: Television/Cinema, Best, 1967: "Words on Paper" ad for IBM typewriter (Production Company), Benton & Bowles agency, New York.
