= Patrick Adiarte =

Filipino actor (1943–2025)

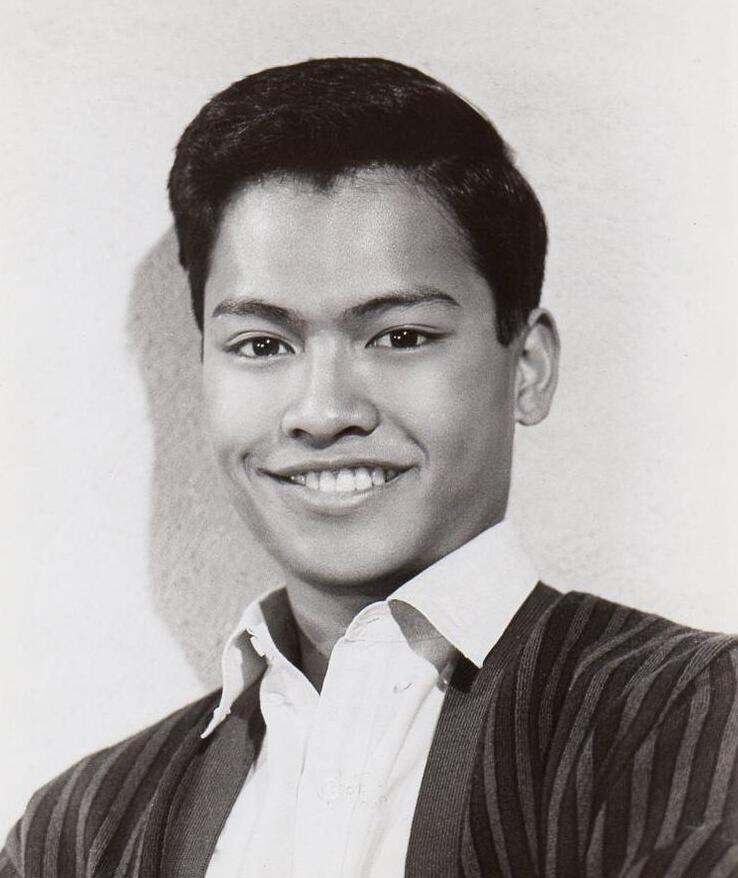
- Adiarte in a publicity photo for Flower Drum Song (1961)
- Born: Patrick Robert Adiarte; August 2, 1942; Manila, Philippines
- Died: April 15, 2025 (aged 82); Los Angeles, California, U.S.
- Occupation: Actor
- Years active: 1956–1974, 1996
- Spouse: Loni Ackerman (m. 1985; div. 1992)

Patrick Robert Adiarte (August 2, 1942 – April 15, 2025) was a Filipino actor, known for his portrayal of characters with Asian or other foreign origins in American film and television productions. His roles included Prince Chulalongkorn in the Rodgers and Hammerstein musical The King and I, Wang San in Flower Drum Song, college student T.J. Padmanagham in High Time, and Ho-Jon in the television series M*A*S*H. He was a regular dancer on Hullabaloo.

== Early life ==
Adiarte's father was killed during the liberation of Manila and his mother fled to the U.S. with Patrick, who was six, and his sister. They settled in New York in 1949, their mother took on jobs to support her children. An actress and singer in the Philippines, she took her children to Broadway auditions in the hope of them getting roles and making money, one open call was for The King and I.

== Later life ==
After leaving acting, Adiarte taught tap dance at Santa Monica College but was forced into retirement in March 2020 after the COVID-19 pandemic broke-out. He was married to actress Loni Ackerman from 1985 to 1992.

== Death ==
Adiarte died of pneumonia in a Los Angeles-area hospital, on April 15, 2025, at age 82.

== Filmography ==
Film
| Year | Title | Role | Notes |
|---|---|---|---|
| 1956 | The King and I | Prince Chulalongkorn | |
| 1960 | High Time | T.J. Padmanagham | |
| 1961 | Flower Drum Song | Wang San | |
| 1965 | John Goldfarb, Please Come Home! | Prince Ammud | |
| 1966 | Step Out of Your Mind | Barney | |
Television
| Year | Title | Role | Notes |
| 1961 | The Enchanted Nutcracker | Prince | TV movie |
| 1967 | The Final War of Olly Winter | Vietcong Guerrilla | 1 episode |
| 1968 | It Takes a Thief | Crown Prince | 1 episode |
| 1970 | Ironside | Loi Tala | 1 episode |
| 1971 | Bonanza | Swift Eagle | 1 episode |
| 1972 | The Brady Bunch | David | 2 episodes |
| 1972 | Hawaii Five-O | David | 1 episode |
| 1972-1973 | M*A*S*H | Ho-Jon | 7 episodes |
| 1973 | Temperatures Rising | | 1 episode |
| 1974 | Kojak | Leonard Wong | 2 episodes |

== Stage ==
=== As actor ===
Theatre credits
| Year | Title | Role | Venue | Refs. |
|---|---|---|---|---|
| 1951 | The King and I | Royal Child (replacement) | St. James Theatre, Broadway | |
| 1954 | The King and I | Prince Chulalongkorn (replacement), Royal Child | North American tour | |
| 1956 | The King and I | Prince Chulalongkorn | New York City Center | |
| 1958 | Flower Drum Song | Wang San | St. James Theatre, Broadway | |
| 1962 | Flower Drum Song | Wang San | Pittsburgh Civic Light Opera | |

=== As director ===
1977: Starting Here, Starting Now at the Old Vat Room at Arena Stage
