= Putao xianzi =

Putao xianzi (葡萄仙子 The Grape Fairy) is a popular children's opera by Chinese composer Li Jinhui, originally written 1922-1923 and most notably staged in a revised and expanded version in Shanghai in 1927. It was one of the most successful of the composer's children's operas. It gave its name to Wong Tin-lam's Hong Kong-made Mandarin film Angel of the Vineyard starring Chung Ching in 1956.
