= Pat Suzuki =

American singer

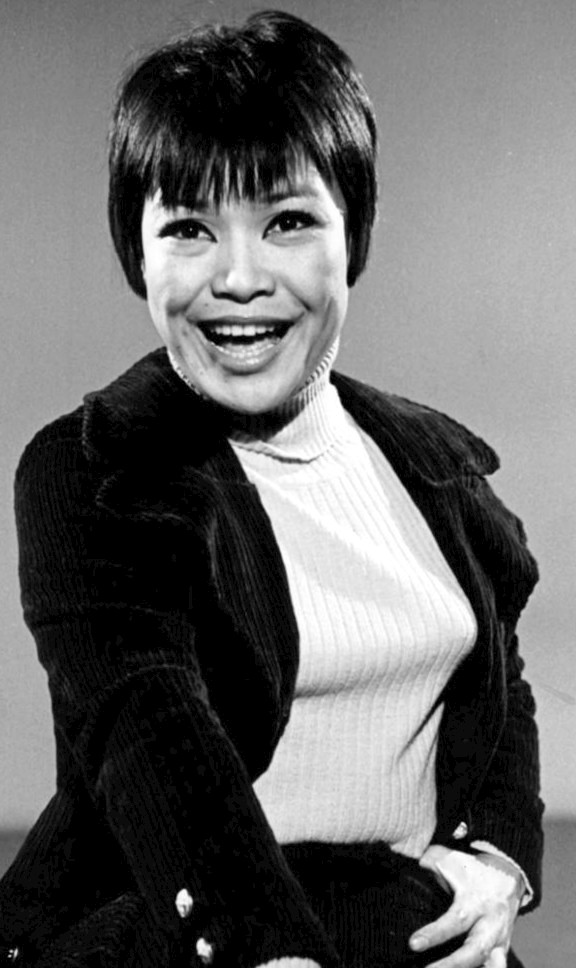
- Suzuki in 1967

Background information
- Born: Chiyoko Suzuki; September 22, 1930 (age 96); Cressey, California, United States
- Genre: Traditional pop
- Instrument: Voice
- Label: RCA Victor

Signature
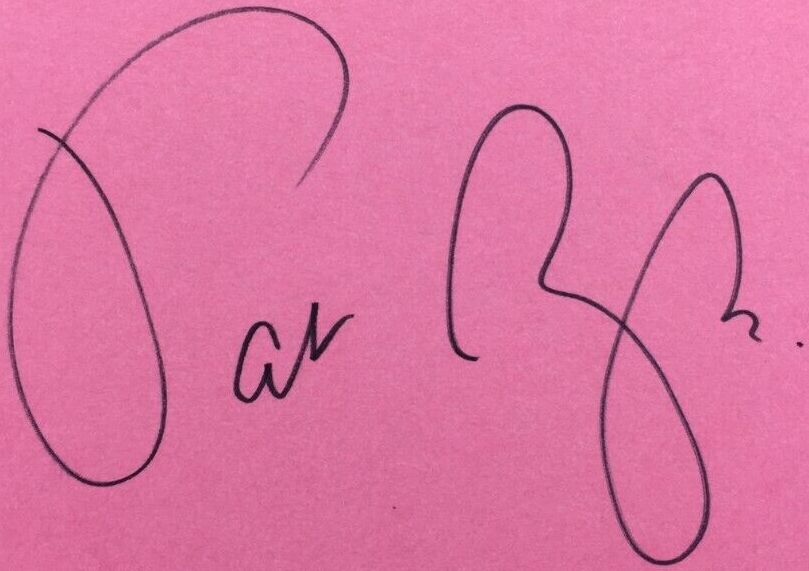

Pat Suzuki (born Chiyoko Suzuki; Japanese: 鈴木千代子, Hepburn: Suzuki Chiyoko; September 22, 1930) is an American popular singer and actress, who is best known for her role in the original Broadway production of the musical Flower Drum Song, and her performance of the song "I Enjoy Being a Girl" in the show.

== Early life ==
Suzuki is a Nisei or second-generation Japanese American, and was born Chiyoko Suzuki, to Chiyosaku and Aki Suzuki, as the fourth of their four daughters. Aki was a musician who played traditional Japanese instruments. When Suzuki was growing up, she was nicknamed "Chibi", which is Japanese for 'short person' or 'small child', as the youngest sister. Suzuki lived with her family in Cressey, California.

In February 1942, a few months after the United States entered World War II, U.S. President Franklin D. Roosevelt signed Executive Order 9066. Under XO 9066, the Suzuki family and more than 110,000 other Japanese American residents of the U.S. Pacific coast states were forced to evacuate their homes and enter American internment camps. The Suzukis were sent to the Merced Assembly Center and later, the Granada War Relocation Center in Colorado. The Suzuki family left Granada to work on a sugar beet farm and returned to California after the war.

During the early 1950s, Suzuki attended five colleges, and graduated from San Jose State University, earning teaching credentials for elementary and secondary schools. After deciding against a career in education, she decided to travel to Europe, but ran out of money in New York, so she obtained a part in a touring production of the play, The Teahouse of the August Moon.

== Career ==
While touring with the company, Suzuki took on gigs singing in nightclubs to cover her expenses, and ended up becoming a local celebrity at the Colony Club in Seattle in 1955, appearing for three years and more than 2,000 consecutive performances. Bing Crosby attended one of her shows at the club in 1957. Her singing so impressed Crosby that he helped her obtain a recording contract with RCA Victor. She recorded several albums for RCA Victor, including her 1958 eponymous album, Pat Suzuki (also known as Miss Pony Tail, after the nickname she had acquired during the Colony Club years), and went on to win the Downbeat National Disc Jockey Poll award for "America's best new female singer" that year. She received national exposure after appearances on several network television programs, including her television debut on The Lawrence Welk Show, The Frank Sinatra Show on ABC and Tonight Starring Jack Paar (March 1958).

After appearing on Jack Paar, Richard Rodgers called Suzuki to offer her the role of Linda Low, one of the leads in the Rodgers and Hammerstein Broadway production of the musical Flower Drum Song in 1958. She actually turned down the role at first ("I thought it was too big for me"), for which she later won the Theatre World Award for an outstanding New York City stage debut performance, in 1959. Suzuki's rendition of "I Enjoy Being a Girl" is deemed to be the definitive recording. Suzuki's performance of the song inspired Christine Jorgensen, who described "I Enjoy Being a Girl" as her theme song and performed it on the nightclub circuit until at least the 1970s. Suzuki and Flower Drum Song costar Miyoshi Umeki were photographed by Philippe Halsman for the December 22, 1958 cover of Time.

I was seven months pregnant at the time and I would have had some trouble playing a stripper.

— Pat Suzuki, on not playing Linda Low in the 1961 film Flower Drum Song, from a 1963 interview with Bob Thomas

However, Suzuki did not appear in the 1961 film version of Flower Drum Song. Actress Nancy Kwan performed the role in the film and singer B. J. Baker dubbed her singing voice. Suzuki had married photographer Mark Shaw on March 28, 1960 and had given birth to their son David shortly before the film was being shot; in addition, Kwan had recently become notable for starring in The World of Suzie Wong.

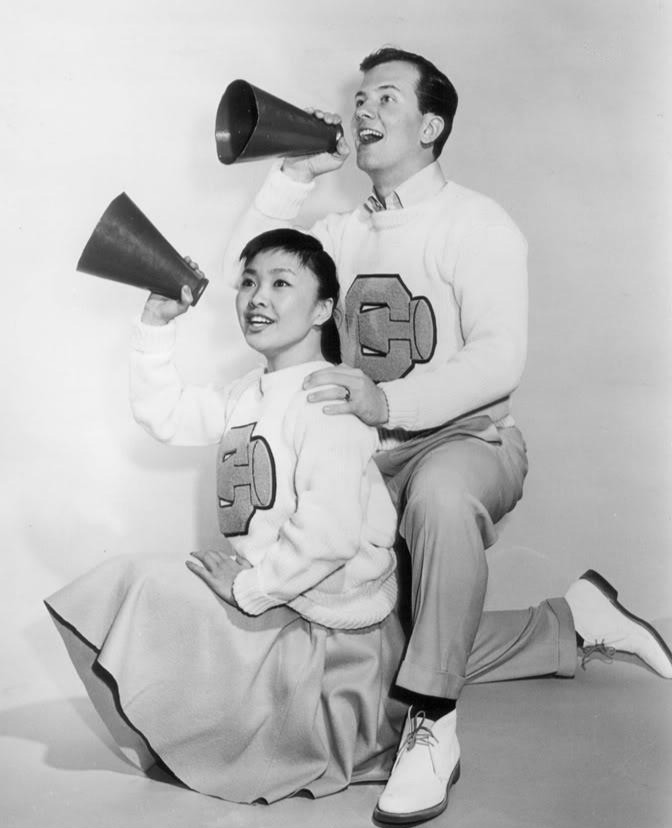
Pat Suzuki with the host on The Pat Boone Chevy Showroom in 1959

In 1960 Suzuki was nominated for a Grammy Award in the Best Female Pop Vocal Performance category, for her album "Broadway '59". When Shaw was serving as the photographer for John F. Kennedy, the couple became close friends with the Kennedys, and Suzuki performed at Kennedy's inaugural ball in 1961 as a Hawaiian politician in a stereotypical accent, which Suzuki later described as "pretty corny."

However, Suzuki had largely retired from show business after David's birth. She returned to touring nightclubs in 1963 (including several on the Sunset Strip), and later performed on The Red Skelton Show in early 1964. Reportedly, Shaw had returned home one day to the New York apartment they shared with their son and, after describing his exciting fashion shoot earlier that day, enquired about Suzuki's activities, prompting her to launch the nightclub tour. Suzuki and Shaw divorced amicably in 1965.

Throughout the 1970s, Suzuki appeared regularly on stage. She played the role of Ma Eng in the off-Broadway production of Frank Chin's The Year of the Dragon. She also appeared in Pat Morita's short-lived television sitcom Mr. T and Tina, the first sitcom starring an Asian American family.

In 1999, Taragon Records released The Very Best of Pat Suzuki on compact disc. The compilation album collected recordings originally made for her first four albums on RCA Victor, including a performance of "Love, Look Away", the torch song for the character of Helen Chao in Flower Drum Song (music by Richard Rodgers and lyrics by Oscar Hammerstein II), originally issued on her 1959 album, Pat Suzuki's Broadway '59.

Suzuki‘s original LPs are on display at the Museum of Pop Culture in Seattle, Washington.

Suzuki continues to sing and act on stage in small and major venues such as Lincoln Center. She has actively supported Asian American civil rights, and, together with Sab Shimono, hosted the 2018 podcast Order 9066, which detailed the history of Executive Order 9066 with first-person accounts.

=== How High the Moon ===
Suzuki's haunting studio cover version of "How High the Moon" (music by Morgan Lewis and lyrics by Nancy Hamilton) was released on her eponymous album in 1958. The cover is anachronistically featured in the motion picture Biloxi Blues during the opening credits and in a later dance scene between the characters Eugene Jerome and Daisy (played by Matthew Broderick and Penelope Ann Miller, respectively).

The same recording is also featured in the 1989 film Eat a Bowl of Tea.

== Personal life ==
Suzuki married photographer Mark Shaw in March 1960. The couple divorced in 1965.

== Discography ==
- 1958 - The Many Sides of Pat Suzuki (Vik)
- 1958 - Pat Suzuki (Vik)
- 1959 - Pat Suzuki's Broadway '59 (RCA Victor)
- 1959 - Flower Drum Song (Original Broadway Cast) (Columbia)
- 1960 - Looking at You (RCA)

== See also ==
- List of Japanese Americans
- List of jazz vocalists
- Timeline of music in the United States (1950–69)
