= I Enjoy Being a Girl =

1958 song by Rodgers and Hammerstein

Song
- Published: 1958
- Songwriter: Oscar Hammerstein II
- Composer: Richard Rodgers

"I Enjoy Being a Girl" is a show tune from the 1958 Rodgers and Hammerstein musical Flower Drum Song. It is the showpiece for the character of Linda Low, the lead showgirl. The musical is a comedic love story about growing up Chinese in America, the clash between the traditional values of the old country and the modern ways of America.

Though Flower Drum Song was not as successful as other Rodgers and Hammerstein musicals, the song "I Enjoy Being a Girl" has remained a popular choice for recording vocalists, including Doris Day, Peggy Lee, Barbara McNair, Pat Suzuki, Lea Salonga, Florence Henderson, and Phranc. The lyrics praise the traditional values of being a woman who longs to be the object of a man's affection.

== Soundtrack recordings ==
The original Broadway cast recording from 1958 includes the version sung by Pat Suzuki, who originated the role of Linda Low. When the musical was rewritten and revived by David Henry Hwang in 2002, Sandra Allen recorded a new version. The version recorded for the 1961 film soundtrack is credited to the character (Linda Low) rather than the actress (Nancy Kwan) as it was sung by B. J. Baker, who is not of Asian descent.

== Cover versions ==
The song has been covered by Sarah Jessica Parker in a Gap commercial in 2005 and went viral as the parody "I Enjoy Being Al Gore" (recorded by the Capitol Steps in 1998). Comedian Roseanne Barr released an album entitled "I Enjoy Being a Girl" in 1990, covering the song as its last track. The song also appeared in a film starring Barr, Look Who's Talking Too, albeit covered by Jodi Benson. It was also covered in Episode 24 of season 3 of "The Muppet Show", when Cheryl Ladd and Miss Piggy bash a dummy and Kermit in Ladd's dressing room. On a 1965 episode of The Entertainers, Carol Burnett, Chita Rivera and Caterina Valente performed a version of the song on a graveyard set, all costumed as Morticia Addams.

Transgender pioneer and activist Christine Jorgensen notably performed the song in nightclubs during the late 1960s.
