= Li Jinxi =

Chinese linguist (1890–1978)

- 黎锦熙
- Born: February 2, 1890; Xiangtan, Hunan, China
- Died: March 27, 1978 (aged 88)
- Occupations: Linguist, lexicographer, educator

Li Jinxi (Chinese: 黎锦熙; pinyin: Lí Jǐnxī; Wade–Giles: Li Chin-hsi; February 2, 1890 – March 27, 1978) was a Chinese linguist and educator. In 1911, he graduated from the Hunan Teachers College. He participated in the China Alliance Committee in his early years and launched the Jiusan Society in 1946. He was the chief editor of Changsha Newspaper and professor of Hunan No.1 Normal College.

After that he held the positions of the Dean of the College of Arts of Beijing Normal College (now Beijing Normal University), Peking University, Yanjing University, the National Northwest Joint University (now Northwest University), Hunan University and Beijing Normal University as the president of Literary College.

After 1949, he became the president of the Chinese Language College of Beijing Normal University, a committee member of the Chinese Academy of Social Sciences, a committee member of the Chinese Writing Reform Committee, and the standing committee of the Jiusan Society.

He devoted his life to studying and teaching language, studying Chinese grammar and Bopomofo (which originates to Zhang Binglin and Wu Zhihui).

== Early life ==
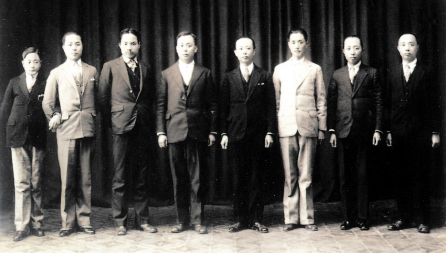
The eight Li brothers in Beijing, 1930. From right to left (oldest to youngest): Jinxi, Jinhui, Jinyao, Jinshu, Jinjiong, Jinming, Jinguang, Jinyang.

Born into a scholarly family in Xiangtan, Hunan, China, Li was the oldest of the eight Li brothers. He studied classic works from his childhood. He also learned poetry, painting, engraving and flute. From the age of 12, he began to write diaries, and never stopped in the following 70 years.

In 1905, he passed the imperial examination at the county level and obtained a xiucai degree. In 1906, he was admitted to the No.1 Middle School of Hunan Province (湖南省立一中). In 1907, he studied at the Beijing Railway School (北京铁路学校). In 1908, he was admitted to Hunan Advanced Normal School (湖南优级师范学堂). After his graduation, he took the editor of Changsha Daily (长沙日报), and in the same year, he joined the Chinese Revolutionary Alliance led by Sun Yat-sen. In 1912, he started the Hunan Public Newspaper (湖南公报) with Zhang Pingzi.

He also compiled the Compilation Bureau of Hunan Province (湖南省立编译局). He chose Journey to the West as the text when compiling the teaching materials, to the surprise of the educational circles. For Li, foundation of the new country was bound to the reform of the old education system, where primary and secondary school students were still bound to learn the Four Books and Five Classics, and practice the outdated eight-legged essay writing.

== Academic contribution ==
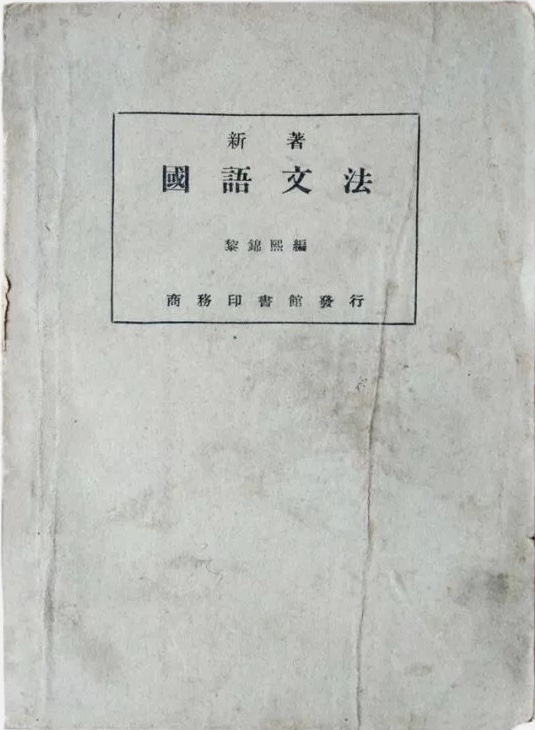
New Chinese Grammar

Li Jinxi studied modern Chinese grammar theory, and advocated the Mandarin revolution. His book, New Chinese Grammar (新著国语文法), published in 1924 by Shanghai Commercial Press, was a comprehensive and systematic description of the modern Chinese grammar. This book, the summary of his long years' Chinese teaching experience, was applied to the high school education, so it produced a lasting effect on student generations in China from 1920s through 1950s. When Li Jinxi devoted himself in proceeding the reform of Mandarin, he especially focused on promoting the alphabetic writing invented by Zhang Binglin and advocated by Wu Zhihui, for adult literacy project (扫盲运动) and children literacy education. However, the July 7th incident of 1937 left phonetic molds in the Japanese occupied territory. As a result, his dream of promoting the phonetic alphabetic failed.

Li Jinxi wrote more than 300 papers and more than 30 books on languages, Chinese word-formation studies and modern Chinese grammar.

== Relationship with Mao Zedong ==
Li met a young Mao Zedong (1893-1976) while working for a newspaper. Li would ask Mao to transcribe some manuscripts, but Mao refused.

Li Jinxi founded the Hunan Public Newspaper (湖南公报), Public Statement (公言) and some other publications with Yang Changji, Xu Teli and others, to publicize the people's thought. He often asked Mao Zedong and other students to help transcribe manuscripts in order to get a certain reward.

Decades later, Li Jinxi said, "When I was starting newspapers in Hunan, three young people helped transcribe manuscripts. The first one transcribed whatever he was given. The second one always gave his opinions whenever he found the wrong places of manuscripts. The third one would refuse to transcribe whenever he disagreed with the content. These three young men with different attitudes of transcribing manuscripts had their different achievements later. The first stayed unknown to the public. The second later became a famous writer, whose name was Tian Han. The third became a great man."

In September, 1915, Li Jinxi went to Beijing for work and separated from Mao. By the year 1920, Mao Zedong had written to Li Jinxi six times. He praised Li Jinxi for his learning ability. He said that Li Jinxi was a good friend and teacher with whom he could discuss knowledge. Li Jinxi also spoke highly of Mao Zedong. Several decades later, Li Jinxi took a great risk preserving the letters Chairman Mao gave him, and after the founding of the People's Republic of China (PRC), he handed over the letters as relics to the relevant department.

After the founding of the PRC, Mao Zedong and Li Jinxi also met. Mao Zedong used to visit Li Jinxi's home and engage in fruitful discussions. Later, because of security reasons, Mao Zedong had to invite Li Jinxi to Zhongnanhai, and conversed about education and language reform. Their relationship lasted 60 years until Mao's death in 1976.

== Works ==
- New Chinese Grammar (新著国语文法) Commercial Press 1924
- Mandarin Movement Survey (国语运动史纲) Commercial Press 1934
- Constructive "public language" Literature (建设的"大众语"文学) Commercial Press 1936
- Phonetic Chinese characters (注音汉字) Commercial Press 1936
- Mandarin Dictionary (国语辞典) Commercial Press 1937
- Phonetic Symbols and Simplified (注音符号与简体字) Commercial Press 1937
- Chinese Grammar Tutorial (中国语法教程) Tianjin Public Press 1952
