= Li Jinhui =

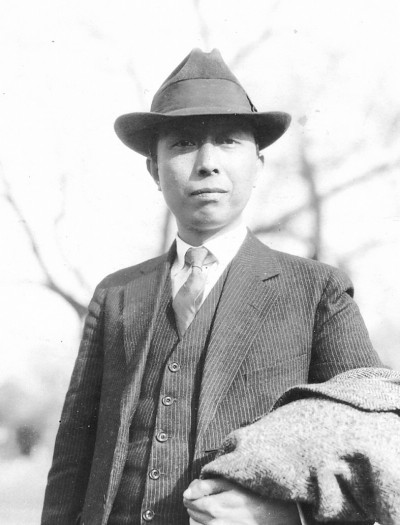
- Born: 5 September 1891; Xiangtan, Hunan, Qing China
- Died: 15 February 1967 (aged 75); Shanghai, PR China
- Occupations: Producer, composer, songwriter
- Spouse: Xu Lai (m. 1930–1935)
- Children: Li Minghui; Li Xiaofeng; Li Lili (adopted)

Chinese name
- Traditional Chinese: 黎錦暉
- Simplified Chinese: 黎锦晖
Transcriptions
Standard Mandarin
- Hanyu Pinyin: Lí Jǐnhuī
- Wade–Giles: Li2 Chin3-hui1
- Musical career
- Genres: Shidaiqu, Mandopop
- Instrument: Guqin

Li Jinhui (Chinese: 黎錦暉; pinyin: Lí Jǐnhuī; 5 September 1891 – 15 February 1967 although some sources suggest he died 1968) was a Chinese composer and songwriter born in Xiangtan, Hunan, Qing China. He created a new musical form with shidaiqu after the fall of the Qing Dynasty—moving away from established musical forms. The Nationalist government attempted to ban Li's music. Critics branded his music as "Yellow Music", a form of pornography, because of its sexual associations and he was branded a "corruptor" of public morals. This kind of music was banned in China after the Chinese Communist Revolution in 1949, and Li was eventually hounded to his death, a victim of political persecution in 1967 during the height of the Cultural Revolution.

== Early years ==
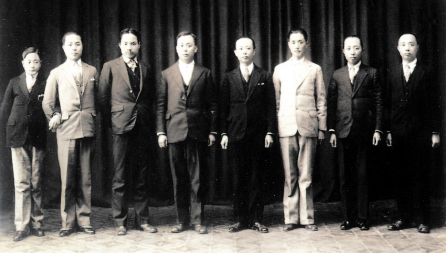
The eight Li brothers in Beijing, 1930. From right to left (oldest to youngest): Jinxi, Jinhui, Jinyao, Jinshu, Jinjiong, Jinming, Jinguang, Jinyang.

Born into a scholarly family in Xiangtan, Hunan, Li Jinhui was the second oldest of the renowned eight Li brothers. His older brother Li Jinxi was a linguist and acquaintance of Mao Zedong, and his youngest brother Chin Yang Lee (Li Jinyang) later became an author in the US.

Li grew up studying the Confucian classics and attending progressive schools like Shaoshan and Xiangtan. In total he had 8 brothers, including Li Jinxi. One of the earliest instruments Li studied was the guqin.

During his teenage years, he became fascinated with Chinese folk music, which he later incorporated into his revolutionary new musical style. Even as a student at Changsha Normal High School, Li's musical aptitude was apparent; the teen served as a musician, choir director, and part-time music instructor before he graduated in 1911.

== Career ==
After a brief stint in Beijing working as the new National Assembly's secretary from 1911 to 1914, Li returned to his native Hunan to direct other student choirs. Li's burgeoning career began in a dramatic way. He wrote several satirical political songs for a Changsha newspaper, but one such song so angered a local warlord that Li received a beating for it.

Li decided in 1916 to move back to Beijing, where he became involved in the New Culture Movement centered at Peking University. He participated in the May 4th Movement of 1919. In Beijing, Li also delved deeper into his lifelong pursuit of his two passions: the pedagogy of language and folk music. A Mandarin Chinese and music teacher, Li spent his time writing textbooks about effective classroom language instruction and exploring many musical genres. He was inspired by the Hunanese flower-drum opera, which is performed over a stage theatre monologue. Because of this, it can be said that the very first inspirations of Chinese popular music are derived from these forms.

As the head of the division of Peking University's Institute for the Promotion and Practice of Music focused on Hunan music, Li began adapting, transcribing, and performing regional Chinese folk songs to celebrate and reach the common people of China. However, Li's efforts were shunned by his colleagues because he failed to focus on the European Romantic music which was in vogue at the time or on traditional musical forms like the kunqu opera. Instead Li focused on the folk songs, which were considered to be "vulgar" and common.

In 1920, Li organized the Bright Moon Song and Dance Troupe, the name of which Li derived from the New Culture Movement's rhetoric; Li described the focus of his musical endeavors, declaring, "we raise a banner of a 'music for the common people,' like the bright moon in the sky, shining across the land for all the people to enjoy". In that same year, Li also became the editor of the Common People's Weekly Magazine, and the next year became an editor at the China Book Bureau, and the following year was promoted to be the principal of the National Language Institute in Shanghai.

Also in 1922, Li began editing the children's magazine Little Friend, which soon became the nation's best selling periodical. In Little Friend, Li promoted anti-feudalist attitudes, national use of Mandarin Chinese, family values, sharing, harmony with nature, and good citizenship through nursery rhymes and children's operas. The songs were stripped down to just the melody, written in simplified notation, and they fused Chinese instrumentation with guitars, violins and pianos.

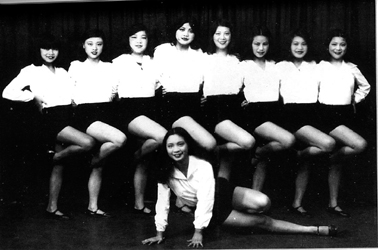
The Bright Moon Song and Dance Troupe, with Wang Renmei in the front

Though Li's early work is completely innocent and educational in content, it still met with disapprobation from some critics despite its immense popularity. This resistance may be due to the manner in which these songs were performed. Beginning in 1923, Li's broke the taboo of not allowing women to perform on stage when he hired young girls to sing and dance in his school musical productions, including The Sparrow and the Child and The Little Painter. Even more controversial was his decision to allow his own daughter, Li Minghui, to perform. Minghui grew to become a singer, actress and child film star, but she was also brutally criticized for her public performances due to the traditional distrust of entertainers as "tawdry and shameful". In 1927 he organized the "Chinese Dance School" (simplified Chinese: 中华歌舞学校; traditional Chinese: 中華歌舞學校; pinyin: Zhōnghuá gēwǔ xuéxiào) and then the "Chinese Song and Dance Troupe" (simplified Chinese: 中华歌舞团; traditional Chinese: 中華歌舞團; pinyin: Zhōnghuá gēwǔtuán).

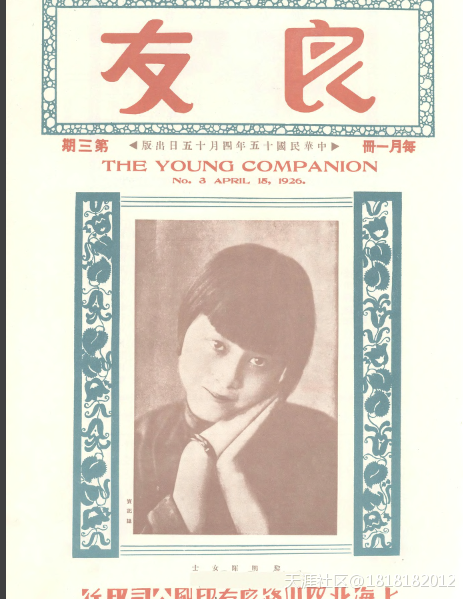
Li Minghui on the cover of Liangyou.

Although Li was forced to disband the Bright Moonlight group due to pressure from the Kuomintang (KMT) and financial troubles, he established the Beauty School for Girls in 1928 so that he could continue to work with a group of his pupils. After a financially unsuccessful tour with his girls, Li released a wildly popular album called Family Love Songs and later released Patriotic Songs in 1932. Armed with the success of his first album, Li reconstituted the Bright Moon Song and Dance Troupe in 1929 and toured around the country. The tour began mostly as political squeeze due to the National Revolutionary Army during the Northern Expedition. When he was situated at Singapore, that was when his "period song" compositions began. The style would have some western influence and it moved Chinese music to a new direction. Those period songs would then be labeled as shidaiqu.

As radio became more widely accessible, so then did Li's jazz, for which he received vicious criticism as "Yellow (or pornographic) Music." One 1934 reviewer said of Li that he is "vulgar and depraved beyond the hope of redemption…[but] as popular as ever". His greatest source of Jazz influence came from American Buck Clayton who worked with Li for two years. Clayton played a major role in shaping the musical scores written by Li. Li's revolutionary Chinese jazz music dominated the nightlife scene, and it was performed at cabarets, cafes and nightclubs around southeast Asia. Li himself led the first all-Chinese jazz band, which played at an upscale Shanghai nightclub. Li's songs were often performed by different "song-and-dance troupes" composed of female singers and male musicians, many of whom had formerly been members of Li's groups. Among the stars who came to prominence due to Li's efforts were Wang Renmei, Nie Er, and Zhou Xuan. Zhou Xuan would later become one of the Seven great singing stars of the Republic of China.

In 1931, Li's troupe merged with the Lianhua Film Company. Li began writing music for films like Romance at the Dancehall, one of China's first musical talkies. Li's music began to be associated with the urban mass marketing of the female image, and an obsession with stardom and commercialism. By 1934, the musical and star-driven movement he began progressed without him. In 1949 he was a composer for the Shanghai Animation Film Studio. Li continued to compose music the rest of his life, though he would eventually pay dearly for his fame. Classified as a founder of Yellow Music by the Chinese Communist Party (CCP), he became a victim of political persecution during the Cultural Revolution.

== Personal life ==
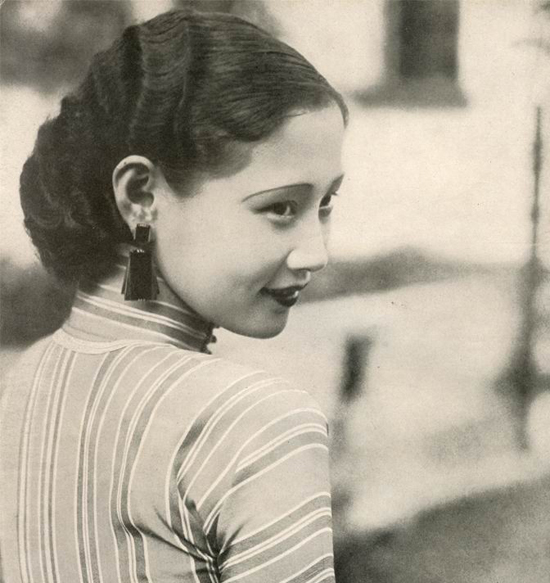
Li's wife Xu Lai

In 1930, Li married Xu Lai, a member of the Bright Moon Troupe. She gave birth to a daughter named Xiaofeng. In 1933, Xu Lai became a movie star with the Mingxing Film Company. Their marriage broke down after the sudden death of Xiaofeng in 1935, and the couple divorced in November that year. Li was devastated by the loss of his daughter and wife. It was an acrimonious divorce and he requested compensation from Xu Lai for the investment he had made in training her. Xu later married Kuomintang general Tang Shengming and worked as a Juntong secret agent during the Second Sino-Japanese War.

Li Jinhui had a daughter, Li Minghui (1909–2003), from an earlier marriage. She is considered China's first pop singer, performing songs written by Li Jinhui.

Li also adopted Qian Zhenzhen, the daughter of Qian Zhuangfei, a legendary CCP secret agent. She changed her name to Li Lili, and became one of the most famous Chinese actresses of the 1930s.

== Legacy ==
Though a controversial figure in his time, Li Jinhui contributed hundreds of songs to the musical community released by many major recording companies, including Great China, Pathe-EMI and RCA-Victor. He also discovered and catapulted into stardom some of Shanghai's most famous recording artists and actress during the late 1920s to 1940s. In his lifetime, critics derided his work as "Yellow Music" because of its sexual associations. His work was labeled pornographic and was accepted only by select groups. His music movement would later grow into the cantopop and mandopop phenomenon, which became the main genre of music in Hong Kong and Taiwan respectively in the 20th century.

== Works ==
- Putao xianzi (葡萄仙子 The Grape Fairy) 1923/1927 children's opera
- San hudie (Three Butterflies), 1926 children's opera
- Maque yu xiaohai (The Magpie and the Little Child), 1927 children's opera

== See also ==
- Roman Tam
- Cui Jian
- Li Lili
- Wang Renmei
