= Flower Drum Song (film) =

1961 musical film by Henry Koster

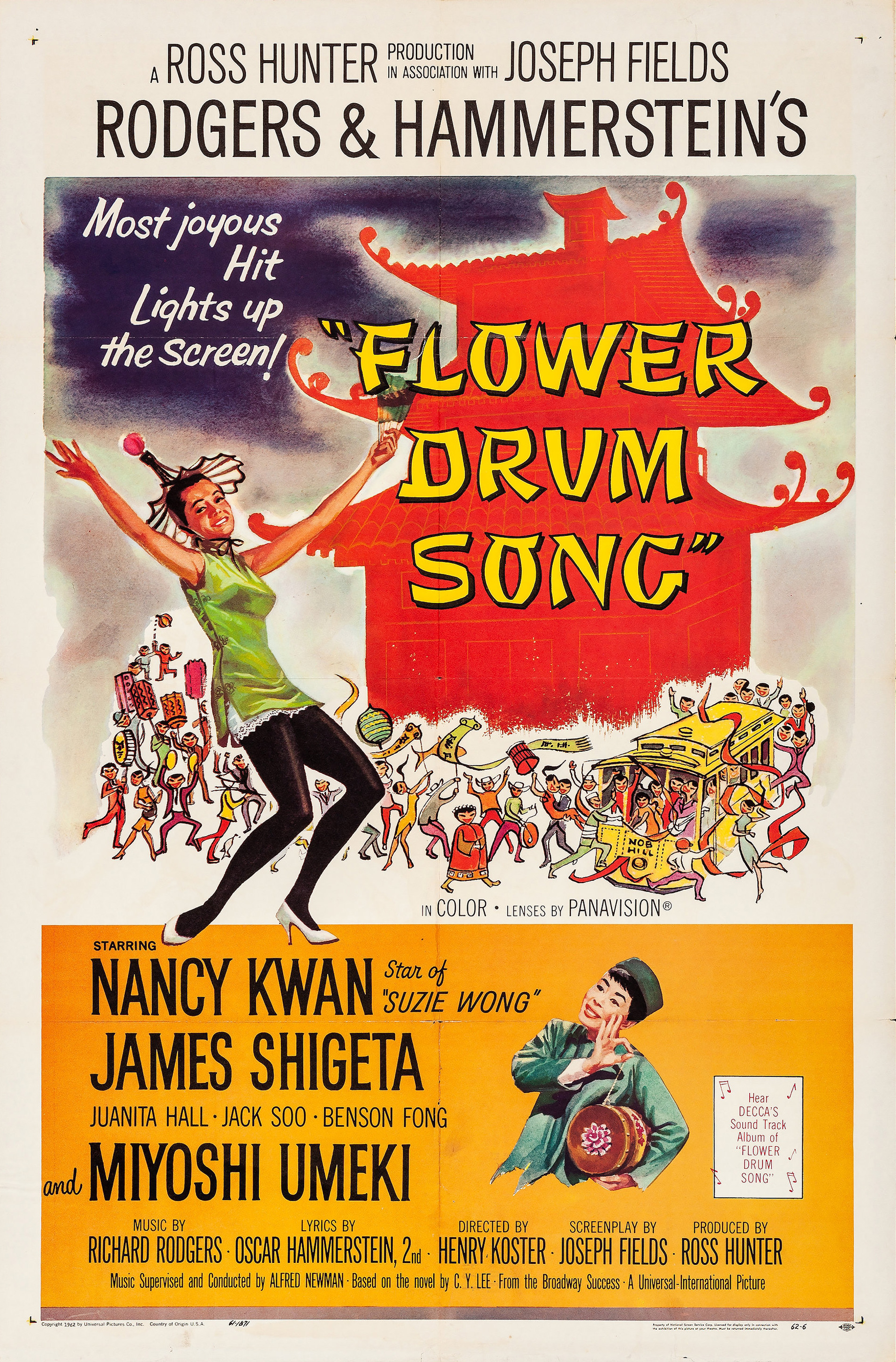
- Theatrical release poster
- Directed by: Henry Koster
- Screenplay by: Joseph Fields
- Based on: Flower Drum Song (musical) by Richard Rodgers Oscar Hammerstein II /Joseph Fields; The Flower Drum Song (1957 novel) by C. Y. Lee
- Produced by: Ross Hunter; Joseph Fields
- Starring: Nancy Kwan; James Shigeta; Miyoshi Umeki; Jack Soo; Benson Fong; Juanita Hall
- Cinematography: Russell Metty
- Edited by: Milton Carruth
- Music by: Richard Rodgers; Alfred Newman; Oscar Hammerstein II (lyrics)
- Production company: Hunter-Fields Productions
- Distributed by: Universal-International
- Release date: November 9, 1961
- Running time: 132 minutes
- Country: United States
- Language: English
- Budget: $4 million
- Box office: $5 million (US/ Canada rentals)

Flower Drum Song is a 1961 American musical film directed by Henry Koster, adapted from the Rodgers and Hammerstein musical Flower Drum Song, premiered on Broadway in 1958, which in turn was based on the 1957 novel by Chinese American author Chin Yang Lee. The film stars Nancy Kwan, James Shigeta, Miyoshi Umeki, Jack Soo, Benson Fong and Juanita Hall. It was nominated for five Academy Awards and two Golden Globe Awards, including Best Motion Picture – Musical or Comedy.

Flower Drum Song is the first major Hollywood feature film to have a majority Asian-American cast in a contemporary Asian-American story. It would be the last film to do so for more than 30 years, until The Joy Luck Club (1993). In 2008, Flower Drum Song was selected for preservation in the United States National Film Registry by the Library of Congress as being "culturally, historically, or aesthetically significant".

== Plot ==
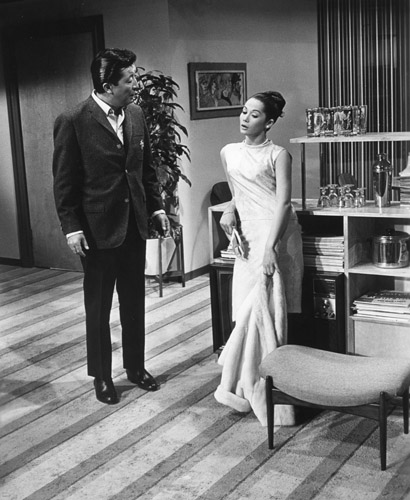
Sammy Fong (Jack Soo) and Linda Low (Nancy Kwan) in Flower Drum Song

Mei Li, a young stowaway on a ship, immigrates illegally with her father from China to Chinatown, San Francisco. After landing, the Lis seek the address of Madam Fong, mother of Sammy Fong, to whom Mei is promised in an arranged marriage. While asking where to find Madam Fong, Mei performs a flower drum song to earn money ("A Hundred Million Miracles"). Sammy, the owner of the Celestial Gardens (Note: Inspired by the actual Forbidden City nightclub.) nightclub, already is romantically involved with his leading showgirl Linda Low. The Lis arrive at the Celestial Gardens during a show ("Fan Tan Fannie").

Sammy does his best to dissuade Mei from marrying him, introducing her to Madame Liang, sister-in-law of Master Wang. Liang and Wang bemoan the gap between immigrants and their offspring ("The Other Generation") as Wang's younger son, Wang San, gives his own take on the gap. Dissolving the marriage contract is harder than Sammy imagined. Wang is persuaded by Liang to allow Mei to fall in love naturally with his eldest son Wang Ta, and the Lis move in with Wang. However, Ta is dazzled by the charms of Linda, who flirts with him ("I Enjoy Being a Girl"). On a date, Linda convinces Ta to give her his fraternity pin, designating that they are "going steady".

When Mei sees Ta sneaking back in after the date, she mistakes his friendly greeting as a welcome to the household and starts to warm to America ("I Am Going to Like It Here"). Linda plans to use Ta to force a commitment from Sammy out of jealousy, but Sammy gets wise to her scheme when Linda attends a party to celebrate both Ta's graduation from university and Liang's graduation from citizenship classes. Liang compares the citizens of the U.S. to a mix of different ingredients ("Chop Suey"). At the party, Linda has Frankie Wing, the club emcee, pose as her brother to grant permission for Linda to marry Ta. Hearing this, Mei becomes discouraged, and Ta and his father argue over his marriage plans. Ta argues he is old enough to make his own decisions, but the father says he will let Ta know when he is old enough.

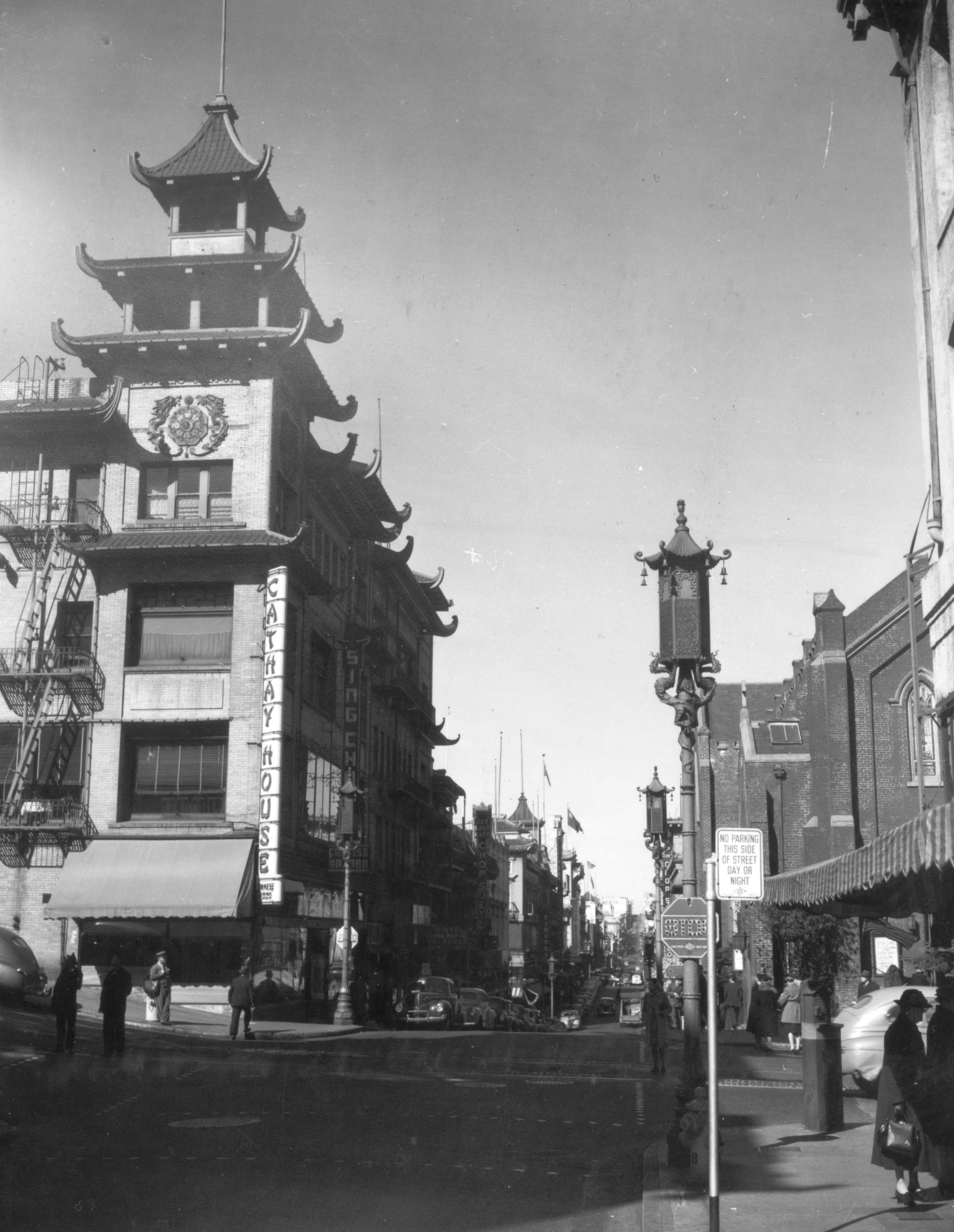
Grant Avenue, Chinatown's "western street with eastern manners" (1945)

Riding on a float at the New Year's Parade, Linda sings about Chinatown's "western street with eastern manners" ("Grant Avenue"). To sabotage Linda, Sammy invites Ta and his family to the Celestial Gardens, where they see Frankie Wing recall girls he has known ("Gliding Through My Memoree") and Linda's burlesque nightclub act ("Fan Tan Fannie"). Shocked at her performance, Ta leaves, distraught. Seamstress Helen Chao, Ta's childhood friend who deeply loves him, accompanies him. Drunk in his misery over Linda, Ta ends up spending the night at Helen's apartment, where she declares her unrequited love ("Love, Look Away").

In the morning, Mei comes to deliver Wang’s coat for Helen to mend and becomes distressed when she discovers Ta's jacket in Helen's kitchen. When Ta wakes up, he remains oblivious of Helen's affections, even as she pleads for him to stay, and he leaves quickly. Now realizing Mei is a better match for him than Linda ("You Are Beautiful"), he speaks with Mei, only to have her reject him, saying she once loved him, but not anymore.

Me and her father leave Wang's house and pursue the marriage contract with Sammy. Sammy has proposed to Linda, who daydreams about wedded life ("Sunday"); however, the contract with Mei is binding. To convince Mei to break the contract, Sammy enumerates his many faults ("Don't Marry Me"). Before the wedding, Ta goes to see Mei, and they both realize they are in love. They agree to come up with a way to get Mei out of her marriage contract. Serendipitously, Mei watches a TV Western on the late show where an illegal Mexican woman declares she is an illegal alien to avoid an unwanted marriage.

The day of the wedding, before she is to sip from a goblet (sealing her marriage to Sammy), Mei declares the marriage contract null and void because she entered the United States illegally. Ta can marry Mei, and Sammy decides to marry Linda, resulting in a double wedding.

== Cast ==
- Nancy Kwan – Linda Low (singing dubbed by B.J. Baker), a showgirl at Celestial Gardens, Sammy's nightclub
- James Shigeta – Wang Ta, older son of Master Wang Chi-Yang
- Miyoshi Umeki – Mei Li, arranged bride for Sammy Fong
- Benson Fong – Wang Chi-Yang, master of the Wang household
- Jack Soo – Samuel Adams "Sammy" Fong, owner of the Celestial Gardens nightclub
- Juanita Hall – Madame Liang, sister-in-law of Master Wang Chi-Yang
- Reiko Sato – Helen Chao (singing dubbed by Marilyn Horne), a seamstress raised in America with unrequited love for Wang Ta
- Patrick Adiarte – Wang San, younger son of Master Wang Chi-Yang
- Kam Tong – Dr. Han Li (singing dubbed by John Dodson), Mei Li's father
- Victor Sen Yung – Frankie Wing, emcee at the Celestial Gardens
- Soo Yong – Madame Yen Fong, Sammy's mother
- James Hong – Headwaiter at the Celestial Gardens

== Music ==
Although the score of Flower Drum Song did not produce many hit tunes, "I Enjoy Being a Girl" has been recorded by such performers as Doris Day, Peggy Lee, Pat Suzuki, and Phranc, and it has been used in other movies and shows, and "Love, Look Away" was recorded by Tony Bennett.

Compared with the Broadway musical on which it is based, the film rearranged the order of the songs. According to David Henry Hwang, the song "Like a God" was dropped from the film because studio executives were worried it could "offend audiences in the American South". Alfred Newman, the film's music supervisor and score conductor, wrote a letter to producer Ross Hunter protesting the excision of music arrangers from the credits during post-production; Hunter agreed to reinsert a credit for Ken Darby, the associate music supervisor.

=== Soundtrack ===
Flower Drum Song: The Motion Picture Sound Track

Soundtrack album by Various artists
- Released: 1961
- Length: 50:34
- Label: Decca

Professional ratings
Review scores
Source	Rating
New Record Mirror	4/5

The 1961 soundtrack album from the film was critically praised; Variety lauded Newman's "rousing orchestration". Shortly after its release by Decca Records, both the monaural and stereo versions of the soundtrack charted on the list of bestselling records, according to Billboard's Top LP's list. For the film soundtrack album, the performers were credited by role, not name, since "several of the performers in the movie don't do their own singing." The singing voice of the character Linda Low (portrayed by Nancy Kwan) was dubbed by B.J. Baker, a white studio singer who had worked with Elvis Presley, Frank Sinatra, Bobby Darin, The Righteous Brothers, and Sam Cooke.

The torch song "Love, Look Away" sung by Helen Chao (portrayed by Reiko Sato) was dubbed in by the American opera singer Marilyn Horne, who was offered the job by Alfred Newman after Horne's triumphant début with the San Francisco Opera in Wozzeck. Horne and Newman were friends through her extensive background singing on film soundtracks. In addition, Dr. Han Li (portrayed by Kam Tong) is dubbed by John Dodson.

The film soundtrack was reissued on CD by Decca Broadway on September 24, 2002, which added a bonus track of "Love, Look Away" (2:27), recorded by Rosemary Clooney around 1958.

All tracks are written by Richard Rodgers (music) and Oscar Hammerstein II (lyrics).

Side 1
No.	Title	Performer(s)	Length
1.	"Main Title—Overture 'Flower Drum Song'" (Instrumental)	Orchestra	5:05
2.	"A Hundred Million Miracles"	Miyoshi Umeki, Kam Tong, Chorus and Orchestra	3:43
3.	"The Other Generation"	Juanita Hall, Benson Fong, Patrick Adiarte, Cherrylene Lee, Virginia Ann Lee and Orchestra	3:27
4.	"I Enjoy Being a Girl"	B.J. Baker and Orchestra	4:10
5.	"I Am Going to Like It Here"	Miyoshi Umeki and Orchestra	2:30
6.	"Chop Suey"	Juanita Hall, James Shigeta, Patrick Adiarte, Orchestra and Chorus	2:32
7.	"Grant Avenue"	B. J. Baker, Orchestra and Chorus	3:16

Side 2
No.	Title	Performer(s)	Length
1.	"Dream Ballet"	Orchestra	5:15
2.	"Gliding Through My Memoree / Fan Tan Fanny"	B. J. Baker, Victor Sen Yung, Chorus and Orchestra	4:31
3.	"Love Look Away"	Marilyn Horne and Orchestra	2:26
4.	"Sunday"	B. J. Baker, Jack Soo and Orchestra	4:11
5.	"You Are Beautiful"	James Shigeta and Orchestra	3:35
6.	"Don't Marry Me"	Miyoshi Umeki, Jack Soo and Orchestra	3:01
7.	"Finale: Wedding Procession + Wedding Ceremony / End Title"	Miyoshi Umeki, B. J. Baker, Chorus and Orchestra	3:01

== Production ==
After the novel was released and became a bestseller, options were offered to author C.Y. Lee to produce a movie or stage adaptation. Lee was torn between the movie offer, which was more lucrative at $50,000, but would force him to give up all rights, or the stage offer from Joseph Fields, which only gave him $3,000 but only relinquished stage rights. After getting drunk the night of the decision, Lee could not remember the offer he chose, but his agent congratulated him on making the right choice the next morning. It turns out Lee had chosen the offer from Fields, who initially wanted to produce a play and eventually a movie, but after Fields mentioned the novel to Rodgers and Hammerstein, they signed on to write the musical.

The 1961 film adaptation of Flower Drum Song was produced by Universal Studios, a break for Rodgers and Hammerstein, who had previously had their films produced by Twentieth Century Fox. The screenplay was written by Joseph Fields, who had previously collaborated with Hammerstein on the libretto for the musical, but had not previously written a major musical film; likewise, the director Henry Koster and producer Ross Hunter were working on their first musical feature film. San Francisco watercolorist Dong Kingman painted the opening title sequence, which traces the journey of Mei Li from Hong Kong. Hermes Pan provided the choreography. Principal photography began on March 20, 1961; the film was largely shot at Stage 12 of the Universal Studios Lot, on a 51,300 ft^{2} (4,770 m^{2}) set built to reproduce Chinatown, including the opening scenes at Saint Mary's Square (complete with a replica of the stainless steel statue of Sun Yat-Sen sculpted by Beniamino Bufano), at a cost of $310,000.

=== Casting ===
The film was the first to feature a cast almost entirely consisting of Asian Americans (one of the few speaking white parts being that of a mugger), including dancers, though three of the singers used for dubbing were not Asian. At the time, the practice of yellowface was more common than Asian actors playing Asian roles (see Examples of yellowface).

Starring in the movie were Nancy Kwan, James Shigeta, Benson Fong, James Hong, Reiko Sato, Victor Sen Yung, and the original Broadway cast members Jack Soo, Miyoshi Umeki, and Juanita Hall (an African American actress who had previously played the Tonkinese Bloody Mary in the Broadway and film productions of Rodgers and Hammerstein's South Pacific).

For an episode of the contemporary TV show Wagon Train, white actor Arnold Stang was cast in yellowface wearing rubber eyelids. For this casting decision, the reason given was that "all of Hollywood's Oriental actors were busy making Flower Drum Song".

Anna May Wong had been scheduled to play the part of Madam Liang, but she died in February 1961, before production began. Kwan was cast in the role of Linda Low when she met Ross Hunter, the producer of Flower Drum Song, at a party after he saw her film debut in the 1960 film adaptation of The World of Suzie Wong. Kwan's hiring was announced in February 1961.

=== Changes from musical and novel ===
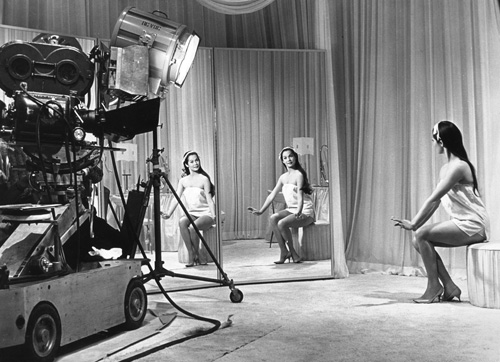
Nancy Kwan on set.

Among changes for the film, the song "Like a God" was changed from a song into a presentation of Beat poetry. The film (and earlier stage version) is more light-hearted than the novel upon which it is based. For example, while Helen is simply left alone and broken-hearted in the musical and film versions, Ta's rejection of her prompts her to commit suicide in the novel. In the novel, Mei Li does not arrive in Chinatown illegally, nor does she have an arranged marriage with Sammy Fong (the character was created for the musical and film).

=== Filming locations ===
Although set in San Francisco, only a few scenes were actually filmed on location, including a scene with Kwan and Shigeta on Twin Peaks. However, neither Kwan nor Shigeta actually filmed at this location. Doubles stood in for them for the long shots of the car arriving and leaving Twin Peaks. The close-ups of Kwan and Shigeta in the car were process shots filmed at Universal Studios in Hollywood with the view from Twin Peaks projected on a screen behind them.

The film includes scenes from the 1961 San Francisco Chinese New Year Festival and Parade.

== Awards and honors ==
Award	Category	Nominee(s)	Result
Academy Awards	Best Art Direction – Color	Alexander Golitzen, Joseph C. Wright and Howard Bristol	Nominated
Academy Awards	Best Cinematography – Color	Russell Metty	Nominated
Academy Awards	Best Costume Design – Color	Irene Sharaff	Nominated
Academy Awards	Best Scoring of a Musical Picture	Alfred Newman and Ken Darby	Nominated
Academy Awards	Best Sound	Waldon O. Watson	Nominated
Directors Guild of America Awards	Outstanding Directorial Achievement in Motion Pictures	Henry Koster	Nominated
Golden Globe Awards	Best Motion Picture – Musical		Nominated
Golden Globe Awards	Best Actress in a Motion Picture – Musical or Comedy	Miyoshi Umeki	Nominated
Grammy Awards	Best Sound Track Album or Recording of Original Cast From a Motion Picture or Television	Alfred Newman and Ken Darby	Nominated
Laurel Awards	Top Musical		Nominated
Laurel Awards	Top Female Supporting Performance	Juanita Hall	4th Place
National Film Preservation Board	National Film Registry		Inducted
Writers Guild of America Awards	Best Written American Musical	Joseph Fields	Nominated

== Release ==
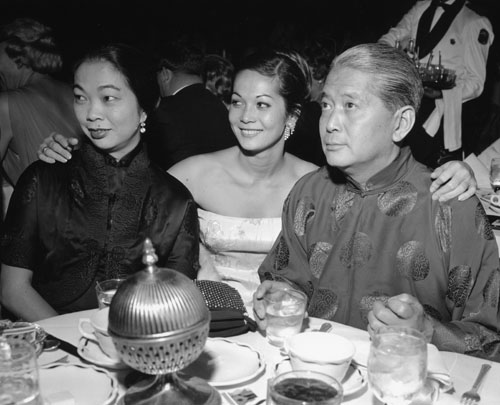
Nancy Kwan with her father and step-mother at the film's premiere.

Flower Drum Song premiered in New York City at Radio City Music Hall on November 9, 1961. The initial plan was to have the premiere on November 17 in San Francisco, at the Golden Gate Theatre, to benefit local hospitals, including the San Francisco Chinese Hospital. The Golden Gate Theatre premiere would be followed by a three-day Flower Drum Festival in Chinatown. A private screening was held for President John F. Kennedy and his family at the Kennedy Compound in Hyannis Port on November 24. The film was widely released near Christmas.

It has been asserted the film was the only Hollywood adaptation of a Rodgers and Hammerstein musical to lose money. The production rights were reported as costing $1 million and the budget was $4 million, while gross revenues have been reported as $10.7 million. Since half of gross revenues are actually returned as "rentals" to the studio, and since movies at the time needed to make back at least twice their production and advertising budgets to be profitable, the movie's $5 million rental return was a loss for the studio.

== Reception ==
Reviewing for The New York Times after the premiere, Bosley Crowther called the film neither "subtle or fragile ... It is gaudy and gaggy and quite melodic." Life called it "gay, tuneful and well worth the admission". However, Variety thought that "much of the fundamental charm, grace and novelty of Rodgers & Hammerstein's Flower Drum Song has been overwhelmed by the sheer opulence and glamour [of the film]".

As a boomer Asian American, you didn't often see people that looked like you on TV. And the idea that the younger generation, at least, was portrayed as American [in the movie] was unusual. So growing up, the musical represented one of the few positive portrayals of people that looked like me. And then, at another point in my life, it became something to be demonized.

— David Henry Hwang, 2001 Los Angeles Times article

David H. Lewis in 2006 called it "a bizarre pastiche of limping mediocracy". He comments that since the 1958 version of the musical was only rarely revived for decades after its initial run, the film "would in future years come to stand for the stage musical it so crassly misrepresented" and would serve as the version that academics and latter-day theatre critics would judge when they analyzed the musical. James Deaville countered that Koster and Hunter "wanted to make the musical more relevant and accessible ... [by] intensify[ing] the generational conflict ... [and] required spelling out much that the musical left to the audience's imagination."

Some Asian-Americans have found the film offensive in later years due to common stereotypes and what was seen as miscasting Japanese American actors Shigeta and Umeki in Chinese American roles. David Henry Hwang, who revised the musical for a 2001 revival, "had a secret soft spot for the movie version. 'It was kind of a guilty pleasure ... and one of the only big Hollywood films where you could see a lot of really good Asian actors onscreen, singing and dancing and cracking jokes.'" Writer Joanna Lee praised the film's portrayal of Asian Americans as "prominent and legitimate American citizens".

On the review aggregator website Rotten Tomatoes, 79% of 56 critics' reviews are positive, with an average rating of 6.2/10. The website's consensus reads: "Flower Drum Song's story may be somewhat skimpy, but this Rodgers and Hammerstein adaptation blooms with brilliant songs and choreography."

=== Home media ===
The film was first issued on VHS in 1986, then reissued in 1991 followed by a LaserDisc version in 1992 by MCA Home Video. The LaserDisc and VHS versions of the film were cropped to a 1.33:1 ratio using pan and scan with the exception of the "I Enjoy Being a Girl" sequence. After the VHS and LaserDisc versions went out of print, the film was unavailable on home media for many years, while most of the other video versions of Rodgers and Hammerstein movies were released on DVD by other studios.

Universal Studios Home Entertainment (in association with the estates of Rodgers and Hammerstein) finally released a DVD version on November 7, 2006, with extra features on the making and casting of the movie. It includes interviews with David Henry Hwang, Pat Suzuki, and Nancy Kwan, and pictures from the 1958 and 2002 Broadway rehearsals and practice sessions, as well as pictures of Rodgers, Hammerstein, and Fields. On May 24, 2022, the film was released on high definition Blu-ray disc.

== See also ==
- List of American films of 1961
