= Flower Drum Song =

Musical by Rodgers and Hammerstein premiered in 1958

- Original Broadway poster (1958)
- Music: Richard Rodgers
- Lyrics: Oscar Hammerstein II
- Book: Oscar Hammerstein II; Joseph Fields; David Henry Hwang (2002 revised version)
- Basis: The Flower Drum Song by C. Y. Lee
- Productions: 1958 Broadway; 1960 West End; 1961 film adaptation; 2002 Broadway revival

Flower Drum Song was the eighth musical by the team of Rodgers and Hammerstein. It is based on the 1957 novel, The Flower Drum Song, by Chinese-American author C. Y. Lee. It premiered on Broadway in 1958 and was then performed in the West End and on tour. It was adapted for a 1961 musical film.

After their extraordinary early successes, beginning with Oklahoma! in 1943, Richard Rodgers and Oscar Hammerstein II had written two musicals in the 1950s that did not do well and sought a new hit to revive their fortunes. Lee's novel focuses on a father, Wang Chi-yang, a wealthy refugee from China, who clings to traditional values in San Francisco's Chinatown. Rodgers and Hammerstein shifted the focus of the musical to his son, Wang Ta, who is torn between his Chinese roots and assimilation into American culture. The team hired Gene Kelly to make his debut as a stage director with the musical and scoured the country for a suitable Asian – or at least, plausibly Asian-looking – cast. The musical, more light-hearted than Lee's novel, was profitable on Broadway and was followed by a national tour.

After the release of the 1961 film version, the musical was rarely produced, as it presented casting issues and fears that Asian-Americans would take offense at how they are portrayed. When it was put on the stage, lines and songs that might be offensive were often cut. The piece did not return to Broadway until 2002, after a successful run in Los Angeles, in a new version that includes most of the original songs, with a book by playwright David Henry Hwang. Hwang's story differs greatly from the original book but retains the Chinatown setting and the inter-generational and immigrant themes, while emphasizing the romantic relationships. It received mostly poor reviews in New York and closed after six months but had a short tour and has since been produced regionally.

== Background ==
=== Novel ===
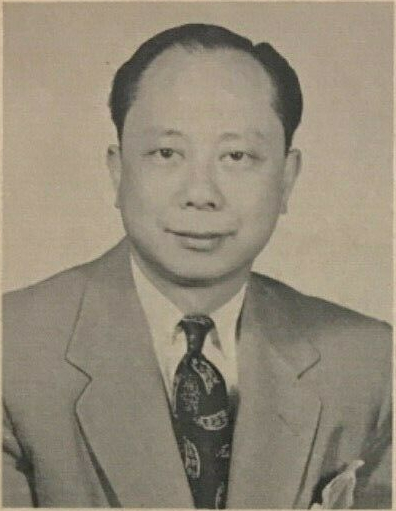
C.Y. Lee

C.Y. Lee fled war-torn China in the 1940s and came to the United States, where he attended Yale University's playwriting program, graduating in 1947 with an M.F.A. degree. By the 1950s, he was barely making a living writing short stories and working as a Chinese teacher, translator and journalist for San Francisco Chinatown newspapers. He had hoped to break into playwriting, but instead wrote a novel about Chinatown, The Flower Drum Song (originally titled Grant Avenue). Lee initially had no success selling his novel, but his agent submitted it to the publishing house of Farrar, Straus and Cudahy. The firm sent the manuscript to an elderly reader for evaluation. The reader was found dead in bed, the manuscript beside him with the words "Read this" scrawled on it. The publishing house did, and bought Lee's novel, which became a bestseller in 1957.

Lee's novel centers on Wang Chi-yang, a 63-year-old man who fled China to avoid the communists. The wealthy refugee lives in a house in Chinatown with his two sons. His sister-in-law, Madam Tang, who takes citizenship classes, is a regular visitor and urges Wang to adopt Western ways. While his sons and sister-in-law are integrating into American culture, Wang stubbornly resists assimilation and speaks only two words of English, "Yes" and "No". Wang also has a severe cough, which he does not wish to have cured, feeling that it gives him authority in his household. Wang's elder son, Wang Ta, woos Linda Tung, but on learning that she has many men in her life, drops her; he later learns she is a nightclub dancer. Linda's friend, seamstress Helen Chao, who has been unable to find a man despite the shortage of eligible women in Chinatown, gets Ta drunk and seduces him. On awakening in her bed, he agrees to an affair, but eventually abandons her, and she commits suicide.

Impatient at Ta's inability to find a wife, Wang arranges for a picture bride for his son. However, before the picture bride arrives, Ta meets a young woman, May Li, who with her father has recently come to San Francisco. The two support themselves by singing depressing flower drum songs on the street. Ta invites the two into the Wang household, with his father's approval, and he and May Li fall in love. He vows to marry her after she is falsely accused by the household servants of stealing a clock, though his father forbids it. Wang struggles to understand the conflicts that have torn his household apart; his hostility toward assimilation is isolating him from his family. In the end, taking his son's advice, Wang decides not to go to the herbalist to seek a remedy for his cough, but walks to a Chinese-run Western clinic, symbolizing that he is beginning to accept American culture.

=== Genesis of the musical ===
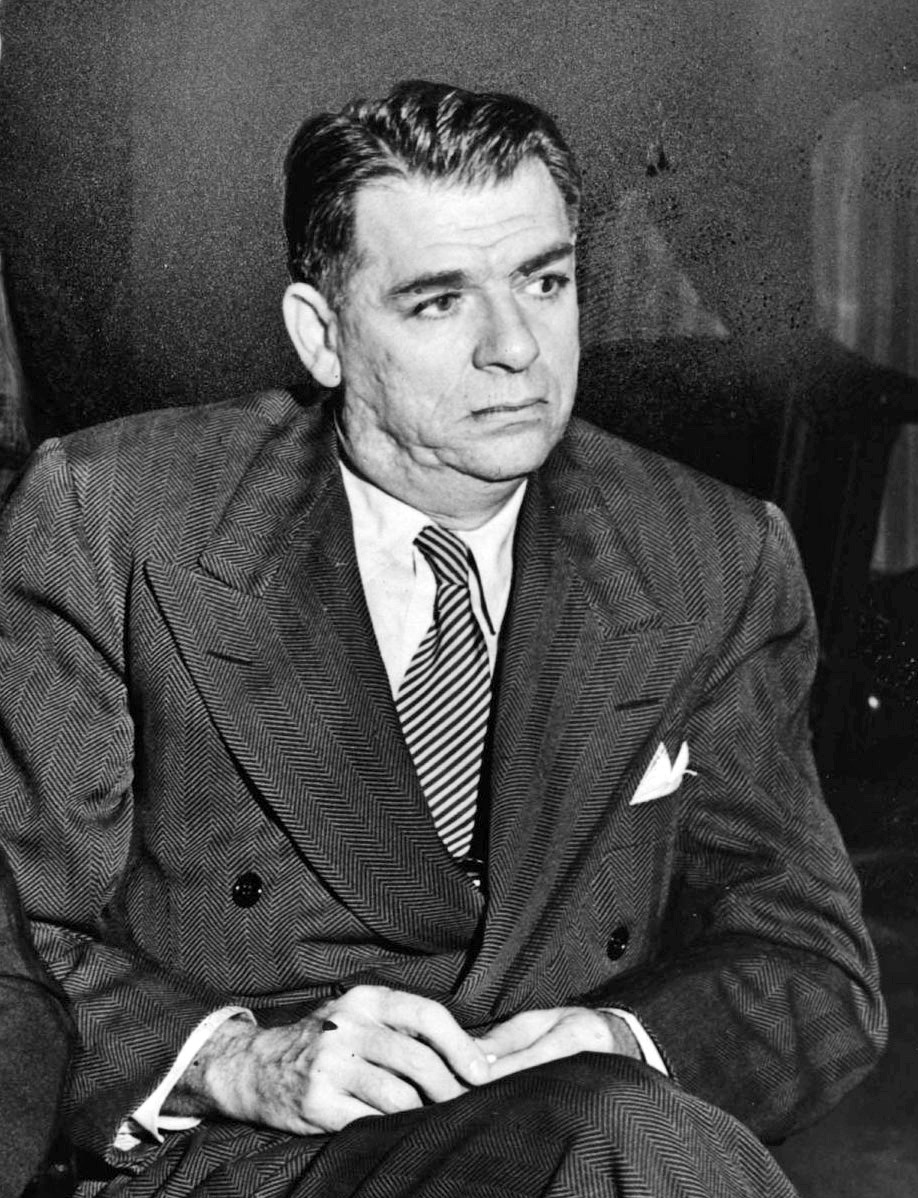
Oscar Hammerstein II

Rodgers and Hammerstein, despite extraordinary successes earlier in their partnership, such as Oklahoma!, Carousel and South Pacific, had suffered back-to-back Broadway relative failures in the mid-1950s with Me and Juliet and Pipe Dream. While Oklahoma! had broken new ground in 1943, any new project in the late 1950s would have to compete with modern musicals and techniques, like the brutal realism in West Side Story, and with other Broadway musical hits such as The Music Man, My Fair Lady and The Pajama Game. Rodgers and Hammerstein had made it their rule to begin work on their next musical as soon as the last opened on Broadway, but by the start of 1957, six months after Pipe Dream closed, the pair had no new stage musical in prospect. They had, however, been working since 1956 on the popular television version of Cinderella, which was broadcast on CBS on March 31, 1957. Rodgers was still recovering from an operation for cancer in a tooth socket, and he was drinking heavily and suffering from depression. In June 1957, Rodgers checked himself into Payne Whitney Psychiatric Clinic, and he remained there for twelve weeks. According to his daughters, Mary and Linda, this did not put a stop to his drinking.

Hammerstein, meanwhile, was in Los Angeles at the filming of South Pacific. While at the commissary, he met longtime friend, Joe Fields, who mentioned that he was negotiating for the rights to The Flower Drum Song. Intrigued by the title, Hammerstein asked for a copy of the novel, and decided that it had potential as a musical – the lyricist described it as "sort of a Chinese Life with Father". Hammerstein consulted with Rodgers, and they agreed to make it their next work, to be written and produced in association with Fields. Hammerstein began work in mid-1958. In July, however, he fell ill and was hospitalized for a month. This forced him to hurry his writing, as the production team had hoped to have the show in rehearsal by the start of September; this was postponed by two weeks. In interviews, however, Hammerstein pointed out that he had, when necessary, written songs for previous shows while in rehearsals for them.

The musical retained Lee's "central theme – a theme coursing through much 20th-century American literature: the conflict between Old World immigrants and their New World offspring". Hammerstein and Fields shifted the focus of the story, however, from the elder Wang, who is central to Lee's novel, to his son Ta. They also removed darker elements of Lee's work, including Helen Chao's suicide after her desperate fling with Ta, added the festive nightclub subplot and emphasized the romantic elements of the story. This made the musical more lighthearted and comedic than the novel. According to David Lewis in his book about the musical, "Mr. Hammerstein and his colleagues were evidently in no mood to write a musical drama or even to invest their comedic approach with dramatic counterpoint of the sort that Jud Fry had given Oklahoma! ... [They] took the safest commercial route by following the eldest son's search for love – the most popular theme at the time with Broadway audiences." Lewis notes that Chao's role, though diminished in the musical, nevertheless gives it some of its darkest moments, and she serves much the same purpose as Jud Fry: to be, in Hammerstein's words, "the bass fiddle that gives body to the orchestration of the story". Though the new story was less artistically adventurous than the earlier Rodgers and Hammerstein hits, it was innovative, even daring in its treatment of Asian-Americans, "an ethnic group that had long been harshly caricatured and marginalized in our mainstream pop culture."

=== 1958 plot ===
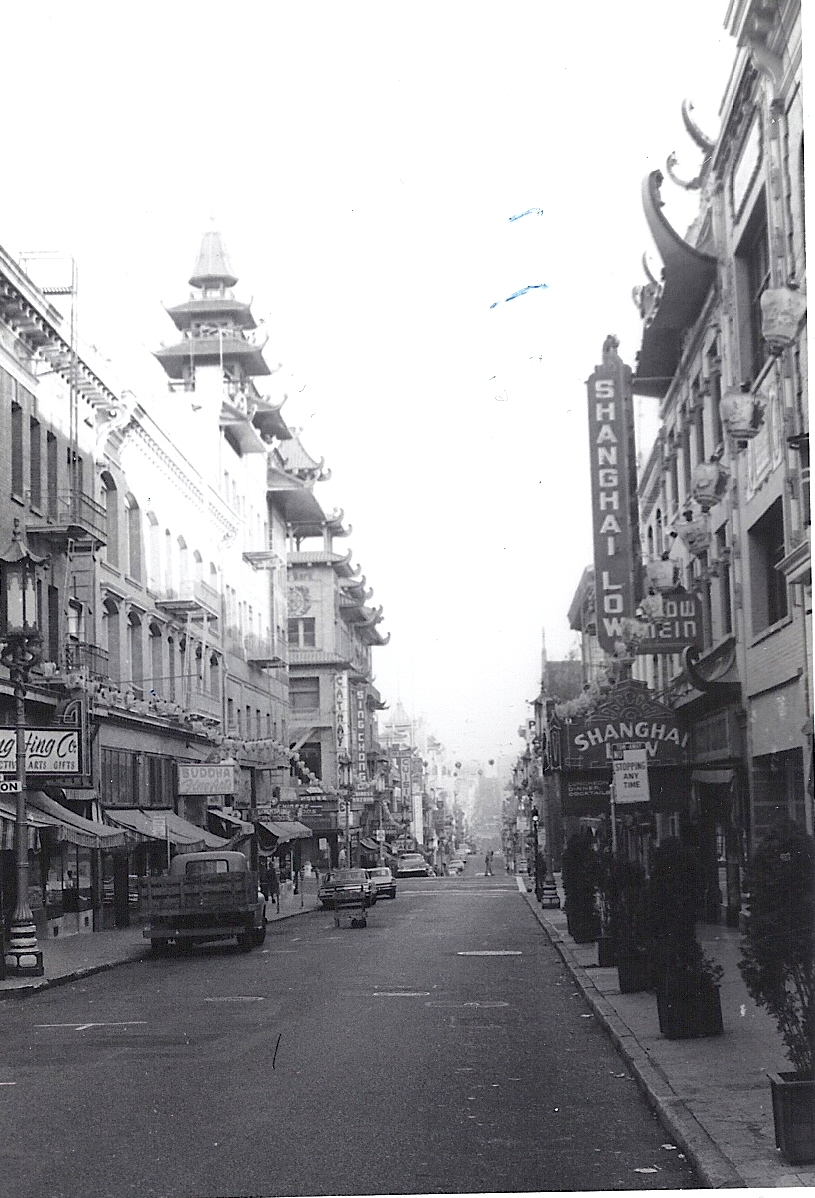
"Grant Avenue, San Francisco, California, U.S.A.", c. 1960s.

Act I: Wang Ta, a young Chinese-American man living in his father's house in San Francisco's Chinatown, discusses the problems of finding a wife with his aunt, Madam Liang ("You Are Beautiful") before hurrying off on a blind date. Nightclub owner Sammy Fong arrives with an offer for Ta's immigrant father, Master Wang, a very old-fashioned Chinatown elder. Sammy's picture bride has just arrived from China, illegally, but the shy Mei Li is clearly the wrong girl for Sammy, who already has an assertive girlfriend, a characteristic he likes. Sammy offers to sign the contract over to the Wang family: this would free Sammy from the contract and arrange a suitable wife for Ta. Sammy has taken the liberty of bringing the girl and her father with him; Wang is charmed ("A Hundred Million Miracles") and invites them to live in his home on the understanding that if the proposed marriage falls through, Fong will still be bound to marry Mei Li.

Ta's blind date proves to be the thoroughly Americanized Linda Low, who is Sammy Fong's girlfriend and a stripper at his club. On the date with Ta ("I Enjoy Being a Girl"), Linda lies to Ta about her career and family. Ta, knowing that Chinese-Americans with college degrees find it hard to get a job befitting their education, plans to go to law school, postponing the likely career struggle by three years. The impetuous Ta asks Linda to marry him. She agrees, but she needs family consent and lies, saying that she has a brother who will approve the marriage. Ta returns home and meets Mei Li, who is immediately attracted to him ("I Am Going to Like It Here"), though Ta is unimpressed. That changes when Ta sees her in a Western dress ("Like a God").

Linda comes to Madam Liang's graduation party from citizenship school with Linda's "brother" (actually the comedian from Sammy's nightclub) and presents herself as Ta's intended, with her "brother" giving his consent for the marriage. The extroverted, Americanized woman is not what Wang has in mind for his elder son, and Wang and Ta argue. Sammy Fong arrives and quickly penetrates Linda's scheme: Linda, frustrated by the five years she has been seeing Sammy, is determined to marry someone, and if Sammy won't step forward, she will settle for Ta. Sammy quickly strikes back by inviting the Wangs, Mei Li and her father to watch the show at his "Celestial Bar" ("Fan Tan Fannie"). Linda does her striptease, realizing too late who is sitting at the best table. Sammy's special guests storm out, except for Ta, who is so humiliated that he does not know what to do. He is led away by childhood friend Helen Chao, a seamstress who fits Linda's costumes for her, and whose love for Ta is unrequited. Linda, goaded beyond endurance when Sammy raises his glass to her, dumps a champagne bucket over his head.

Act II: The drunken Ta spends the night at Helen's apartment ("Ballet"). In the morning, Mei Li delivers Master Wang's coat for Helen to mend and is distressed to see Ta's dinner jacket there. Mei Li jumps to conclusions and leaves horrified. Ta leaves the lonely Helen, totally oblivious to her attempts to interest him. Wang wants the bar and its "evil spirits" shut down; his sister-in-law informs him that free enterprise cannot be shut down, and the two wonder at the foibles of the younger generation ("The Other Generation"). Ta arrives home to admit that his father was right, Mei Li is the girl for him. But now, Mei Li wants nothing to do with him, and the Lis leave the Wang home. Sammy Fong and Linda decide to get married ("Sunday"), but when he goes to the Three Family Association (a benevolent association) to announce Linda as his bride, he finds Mei Li and her father there, and the elders insist that he honor his betrothal to the immigrant girl.

Ta brings Mei Li a wedding gift of a pair of his mother's earrings that she wore on her wedding day and tries unsuccessfully to hide the fact that he is now deeply in love with her. The wedding procession moves down San Francisco's Grant Avenue with the bride, heavily veiled, carried on a sedan chair ("Wedding Parade"). Sammy drinks from the traditional wedding goblet, then offers the goblet to his new bride. Unveiled, Mei Li confesses to Sammy's mother that she cannot marry Sammy as she is an illegal alien – a tactic she learned by watching American television. The contract is void, and that gives both Sammy and Ta the opportunity to marry their true loves, Linda and Mei Li.

=== Casting and tryouts ===
According to Rodgers biographer Meryle Secrest, Rodgers, Hammerstein and Fields had hoped to engage Yul Brynner as director. Brynner, who had gained fame in the team's 1951 hit, The King and I, was an accomplished director. However, he was busy starring in The Sound and the Fury, and they could not negotiate his release from Twentieth-Century Fox. Instead, they hired actor and dancer Gene Kelly, who had never directed on stage before. Kelly felt that the work would not be one of Rodgers and Hammerstein's best, but "as long as I crammed the show brim-full of every joke and gimmick in the book, I could get it to work".

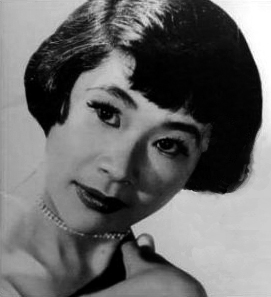
Miyoshi Umeki played Mei Li

The three producers sought Chinese, or at least Asian, actors to fill the cast, an idea that was, at the time, considered "very risky". In the 1950s, there were relatively few Asian-American actors; Rodgers believed that Asians avoided acting because of shyness. Critics note, in any case, that Asian-Americans "had found few opportunities in mainstream theatre." Joshua Logan recommended a young Japanese actress, Miyoshi Umeki, whom he had discovered and cast the previous year opposite Marlon Brando in the film Sayonara (for which she won the Best Supporting Actress Oscar); she was cast as Mei Li. They cast Keye Luke, well known as Charlie Chan's Number One Son, as Master Wang. Rodgers and Hammerstein considered young talent from The King and I who might fit the parts, and came up with teenager Patrick Adiarte, a Filipino-American who had played several of the young princes as he grew up, before finishing as the crown prince, Chulalongkorn. A talented dancer, he was cast as Wang San, Ta's thoroughly Americanized younger brother. Pat Suzuki, a Japanese-American who had been interned during World War II, was a recent arrival in New York who had made strong positive impressions for her singing on such television programs as The Tonight Show (with Jack Paar) and The Ed Sullivan Show. She became the first Linda Low, as Ta's nightclub love interest was renamed.

The team found it difficult to fill the remaining places in the company with Asian performers, especially in the chorus. Four other shows with Asian themes had opened or were in rehearsal in New York, and the demand for the few Asian actors was strong. Kelly and the show's choreographer, Carol Haney, journeyed to cities across the country to seek out talent. Agents were sent to other cities; in Honolulu, they found nightclub singer and native Hawaiian Ed Kenney, who would originate Wang Ta. Meanwhile, in New York, the three producers were visiting dance schools. An advertisement in New York Chinatown newspapers received one response. No formal audition was held in San Francisco's Chinatown, and the only find was Forbidden City nightclub comedian Goro "Jack" Suzuki (who soon changed his name to Jack Soo), who was cast as Frankie Wing, comedian at Sammy Fong's Celestial Bar. The role of Fong proved difficult to cast. Initially, it was given to Larry Storch, a nightclub comic, but during the Boston tryouts, it was given to another Caucasian, Larry Blyden, who was married to Carol Haney, the show's choreographer. The role of Madam Liang, Master Wang's sister-in-law, fell to Juanita Hall, a light-skinned African American who had played a Tonkinese (Vietnamese) woman, Bloody Mary, in South Pacific. Another African-American performer, Diahann Carroll, was considered for the cast but not hired. Rodgers later wrote, "what was important was that the actors gave the illusion of being Chinese. This demonstrates one of the most wonderful things about theatre audiences. People want to believe what they see on a stage, and they will gladly go along with whatever is done to achieve the desired effect. Ask them to accept Ezio Pinza as a Frenchman [in South Pacific], Yul Brynner as Siamese and they are prepared to meet you nine tenths of the way even before the curtain goes up."

When rehearsals began in September 1958, Hammerstein was absent, still recuperating from his surgery. Rodgers was present, but kept falling asleep. Hammerstein was told by his son James that Kelly was ineffective as a director, and began attending rehearsals. A number of changes were made to the songs. "My Best Love", a song for Master Wang, was at first thought better suited to his sister-in-law, but when Juanita Hall could not make it work, the song was cut entirely. Rodgers and Hammerstein transformed a song entitled "She Is Beautiful" into "You Are Beautiful". The team decided to include a song for Sammy Fong to explain to Mei Li that they should not wed. In the span of a few hours, they wrote the lyrics and music to "Don't Marry Me". Once the songs were finalized, Robert Russell Bennett, who had orchestrated several of the creators' most successful previous shows, did the same for the score of Flower Drum Song.

The musical opened for tryouts on October 27, 1958, at Boston's Shubert Theatre. The audience gave it an enthusiastic response, causing Rodgers to leave his seat repeatedly and race to the back of the theatre, looking for someone to hug. The Boston critics thought well of the work, stating that after the show was polished, it was likely to be a hit. Shortly after the Boston opening, Fields suffered a heart attack, and, after his release from the hospital, he had to return to New York to recuperate. Author C. Y. Lee, who had quietly watched the rehearsals, recalled that, at the Boston performances, Hammerstein would have a secretary mark on the script any sound of the chairs squeaking, as indicating that the audience was restless. Hammerstein rewrote some of the book to expand the focus from Ta himself to the romantic relationships of the two couples.

== Productions ==
=== Original Broadway production ===
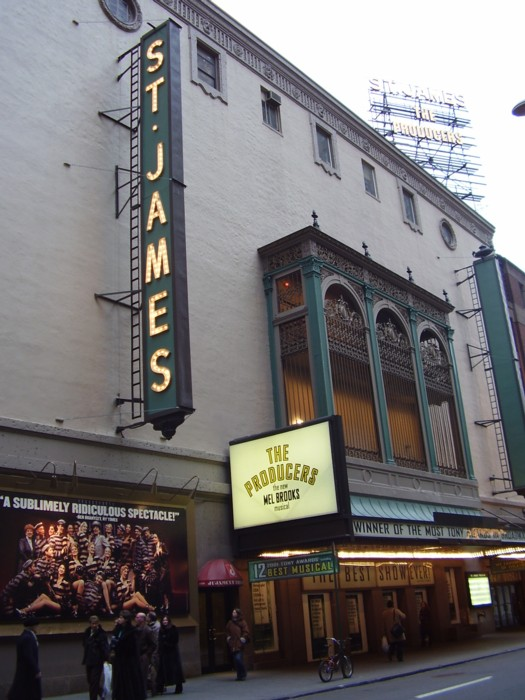
St. James Theatre in 2006

After the Boston tryouts, Flower Drum Song opened on Broadway at the St. James Theatre on December 1, 1958. Sets were designed by Oliver Smith, costumes by Irene Sharaff and lighting by Peggy Clark.

C.Y. Lee sat in the audience on the first night; he later stated that he had been nervous and was "bowled over" by the positive audience reaction. The show attracted considerable advance sales; even when these were exhausted, sales remained strong and sellouts were the norm. Cast album sales were similar to previous Rodgers and Hammerstein hits. The show received six Tony Award nominations, but won only one Tony (Best Conductor and Musical Director, for Salvatore Dell'Isola). It was overshadowed that year by Redhead, which though it received only slightly better reviews than Flower Drum Song and had a considerably shorter run, dominated the Tony Awards in the musical categories. Flower Drum Song ran for 600 performances, a longer run than any of the shows with which it had competed for Asian performers.

Midway through the run, Larry Blyden left the show and was replaced in the role of Sammy Fong by Jack Soo, with Larry Leung assuming the role of Frankie Wing. The production returned $125,000 profit to its backers on an investment of $360,000. Attendance began to decline in December 1959, though it continued to draw at above the 70% of capacity level which a Broadway play then needed to meet expenses. With the summer approaching, generally a bad time for attendance, it was decided to close the show, and the last Broadway performance was given on May 7, 1960.

In his autobiography, Rodgers wrote of the effect the success of Flower Drum Song had on his state of mind:

The entire experience of working on Flower Drum Song was rewarding in many ways, not the least of which was that it convinced me that I had overcome all traces of my depression. My only thought was to keep on doing what I was doing, and I saw nothing in the future that could stop me.

=== Subsequent productions ===
The show opened in London's Palace Theatre on March 24, 1960, and ran for 464 performances. Fewer Asian performers were used in London; the West End production starred Yau Shan Tung as Mei Li, Kevin Scott as Ta, George Minami as Wang, Harriet Yamasaki ("Yama Saki") as Linda Low, Tim Herbert as Sammy Fong and Ida Shepley as Madam Liang. The production used Haney's choreography, Bennett's orchestrations and the Broadway set and costume designs, but was directed and supervised by Jerome Whyte. Both the production and the London cast album were well received.

Following the closure of the Broadway production, a U.S. national tour began on May 10, 1960, in Detroit. Four of the New York leads, Hall, Soo, Kenney and Luke, joined the tour. By this time, Hammerstein was in his final illness (he died in August 1960), and none of the three producers accompanied the show on the road. After three weeks in Detroit, the show moved to Los Angeles, where the premiere attracted a star-studded audience, including three Scandinavian princesses. San Francisco gave the show a rapturous reception when it opened at the Curran Theatre on August 1. Lee and Fields, both present for the local premiere, were given ovations. Geary Street, on which the theatre is located, was decorated with Chinese lanterns, and a marching band of "Chinese girl musicians" played outside. The tour continued to be successful, spending 21 weeks in Chicago alone. It closed on October 14, 1961, in Cleveland, a month before the film of the musical opened.

Lewis calls the 1961 film version of Flower Drum Song, starring Umeki, Soo, Hall and Suzie Wong star Nancy Kwan, "a bizarre pastiche of limping mediocrity". He comments that since the 1958 version of the musical was rarely revived, the film "would in future years come to stand for the stage musical it so crassly misrepresented" and would serve as the version that academics and latter-day theatre critics would judge when they analyzed the musical. The film was the only Hollywood adaptation of a Rodgers and Hammerstein musical to lose money. Nevertheless, it was nominated for five Academy Awards and featured choreography by Hermes Pan. As early as mid-1961, the musical was licensed for local productions. That summer, the San Diego Civic Light Opera filled the 4,324-seat Balboa Park Bowl to overflowing for a highly successful run of the musical. It was less successfully revived by that company five years later; though it still attracted large crowds, local critics complained that Hammerstein's view of Asians was outdated. Other early productions included successful revivals by the St. Louis Municipal Opera in 1961 and 1965 and revivals in the San Francisco area in 1963 and 1964, both times with Soo as Sammy Fong.

The musical proved difficult to produce for amateur and school groups, however, because it requires a cast either Asian or made up as Asian. Even professional companies found it difficult to round up an entire cast of Asian singer-dancer-actors. By the late 1960s, the musical was rarely staged, and was often relegated to dinner theater productions. The Rodgers & Hammerstein Organization, which licenses the partnership's works, believes that the work's loss of popularity was due in part to increased racial sensitivity in the U. S. after the civil rights movement. In addition, producers found the show to be thinly plotted, and the songs not integrated as organically with the characters and story, as compared with Rodgers and Hammerstein's most popular musicals.

Flower Drum Song came to be seen by some as stereotypical and patronizing towards Asians, and that it was "inauthentic, even offensive in its relentlessly upbeat picture of a big-city Chinatown". In 1983, the announcement that it would be produced in San Francisco started a furor; the producers pointedly stated that the show would be set in the 1930s and would have "a greater sensitivity toward the Chinese immigration problems at that time". They added a scene in which Mei Li listens apprehensively to a radio broadcast warning about the dangers to the United States caused by Asian immigration. Many lines of dialogue were cut, and producer Fred Van Patten stated that "[w]hat we've done is cut things in the show that Asians said to make white people laugh." The song "Chop Suey" was deleted, as was Master Wang's line that all white men look alike (based on a line in C. Y. Lee's novel, in which Wang states that all foreigners look alike). The author gave a rare public interview to defend his novel and the musical adaptation. The production, which had been scheduled for a three-week run, closed early. A well-attended production in Oakland in 1993 adhered strictly to the 1958 script, though part of the ballet was cut for lack of rehearsal time; a more heavily censored 1996 production in San Mateo also did well at the box office.

=== 2002 revival ===
In 1996, while attending the successful revival of The King and I, Chinese-American playwright David Henry Hwang considered whether other Rodgers and Hammerstein shows could be revived and decided to work on Flower Drum Song. To Chinese Americans, the musical "represented political incorrectness incarnate. But [Hwang] had a secret soft spot for the movie version. 'It was kind of a guilty pleasure ... and one of the only big Hollywood films where you could see a lot of really good Asian actors onscreen, singing and dancing and cracking jokes.'" Ted Chapin, president of the Rodgers & Hammerstein Organization, announced that an unnamed "Asian playwright" had approached him about revising Flower Drum Song. Chapin called the musical "a naive, old fashioned, anti-feminist story with a truly great score. ... It's one that ... needs changes." Rodgers' will urged his heirs to do what they believed he would have agreed to (Hammerstein's instructions are unknown), but during her lifetime, his widow Dorothy had refused to countenance major changes in the plays. Hwang's involvement was soon revealed, and in 1997, C. Y. Lee announced that the rewrite had his approval.

Hwang was given a free hand with dialogue; he was not allowed to change lyrics. Hwang was inexperienced at writing musicals, and the producers hired veteran Robert Longbottom to direct the production and collaborate on the new script, "really a new musical which has a pre-existing score." Only the character names, the San Francisco Chinatown setting and some of the relationships were retained, but the pair sought to be faithful to the spirit of both Lee's novel and the musical's original concept of old-world and older generation values struggling with new-world temptations and the desires of the younger generation. This concept is reflected in the struggle for survival of Wang's Chinese opera company, as it competes with the more modern, Americanized night club run by Ta. The role of Mei-li (as spelled in the revision) was expanded. The character of Madam Liang was changed "from the wise-owl aunt" to a "savvy career woman" in show business. Chinatown is portrayed as a more gritty and difficult place for new immigrants, and the pursuit of material success is given a more cynical face, especially in Act II. The song "The Other Generation" was deleted; "My Best Love", which had been cut in tryouts in 1958, was restored in its place, and "The Next Time It Happens" was imported from Pipe Dream. New orchestrations were by Don Sebesky and music director David Chase. According to The New York Times, Hwang "has reshaped the story to elucidate two of his own abiding thematic interests: the idea of the theater as a prism for society and the generational clashes of diversely assimilated immigrants."

In September 2000, after development through a series of workshops, the new version was presented at two well-attended workshops for potential backers. The show failed to raise enough money for an immediate Broadway run, but Hwang hoped that an extended Los Angeles run would lead to raising additional funds. The revival was originally planned for the 2,000-seat Ahmanson Theatre in Los Angeles, but to save money he moved it to the nearby 739-seat Mark Taper Forum. Producer Gordon Davidson engaged an all-Asian cast, including Broadway star Lea Salonga as Mei-li. When it finally opened on October 14, 2001, the production received rave reviews from the Los Angeles critics. The show regularly sold out and was so popular it became the first show at the Taper to extend its scheduled run. It finally closed on January 13, 2002.

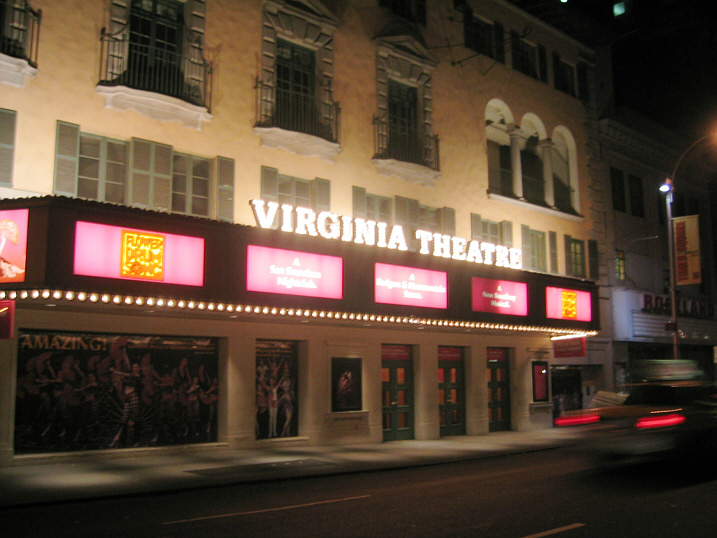
Virginia Theatre marquee showing Flower Drum Song

The success of the Los Angeles run sparked sufficient investment to move the show to Broadway. Half the cast was dismissed after the Los Angeles run for unstated reasons. Mary Rodgers later commented that Randall Duk Kim replaced Tzi Ma as Wang because she had admired Kim's performance as the Kralahome in the 1996 revival of The King and I, but Kim was unavailable for the Los Angeles run. Hwang considerably altered and trimmed his long script during Broadway rehearsals and previews; "The Next Time It Happens" was removed from the show. During the runup to the Broadway opening, the show received mostly positive publicity.

Opening night at the Virginia Theatre on October 17, 2002, was attended by veterans of the film and 1958 production. Though it received warm applause from the audience, the critics mostly panned it. Attendance was near-capacity during the first month of the run, but then dropped off precipitously. The producers hoped the show could hold out long enough to get a boost from the Tony Awards (though nominated for three, including best book, it won none), but in February, they announced that the show would close on March 16, 2003, after 169 performances. The show's backers lost their entire investment.

The production was directed and choreographed by Longbottom, with scenic design by Robin Wagner, costume design by Gregg Barnes and lighting design by Natasha Katz. Critic Karen Wada, in her afterword to the published script, blamed "the sluggish economy, post-September 11 jitters, the New York Times' mixed review, and unusually bitter winter weather" for the unexpectedly short run. Lee also felt that the influential Times review had hurt the show's acceptance, but commented that Hwang added some dialogue to Act II after the Los Angeles run that Lee felt slowed the show down. The closing was followed by a national tour that garnered mixed reviews, although Hwang stated that it was well received in every city except New York.

Subsequent productions have favored the Hwang script, although the older version remains available for license and has received occasional revivals, including a 2006 staged concert as part of Ian Marshall Fisher's Lost Musicals series. A review in London's The Times compared this production with "the much grander production of Show Boat currently docked at the Albert Hall" and judged that "Flower Drum Song makes the more stimulating experience."

==== 2002 plot ====
Prologue: In 1960, Wu Mei-li, a performer in Chinese opera, flees China with a flower drum after her father dies in prison for defying the Communists ("A Hundred Million Miracles").

Act I: On arrival in the United States, Mei-li goes to the Golden Pearl Theatre in San Francisco's Chinatown, where little-attended Chinese opera is presented by her father's old friend Wang Chi-yang and Wang's foster brother Chin. One night a week, Wang's son Ta turns the theater into a nightclub, starring the very assimilated Linda Low, a Chinese-American stripper from Seattle. Linda's constant companion is a gay costume designer, Harvard (so named by his success-obsessed Chinese parents). The nightclub is profitable; the Chinese opera is not. Mei-li joins the opera company ("I Am Going to Like It Here") and is soon attracted to the indifferent Ta, who favors Linda. Mei-li is fascinated by Linda, who urges her to adopt the American lifestyle ("I Enjoy Being a Girl"). Linda is soon signed by talent agent Rita Liang, who pushes Wang to turn the theater into a club full-time ("Grant Avenue"), and he reluctantly opens Club Chop Suey.

Ta slowly is becoming attracted to Mei-li, who now serves as a waitress, but he has competition from fortune cookie factory worker Chao, whom Mei-li met on the slow journey from China, and who is rapidly becoming discontented with America. Wang is also unhappy, despite the club's success, and it is no consolation the crowd is having a good time – after all, in the old country, no crowd ever came to his theater expecting to enjoy themselves. Outraged at Harvard's poor acting skills, Wang takes the stage in his place, his stage instincts take over ("Gliding Through My Memories"), and he is soon an enthusiastic supporter of the change, taking the stage name Sammy Fong. Linda advises Mei-li to put on one of her old stripper dresses to attract Ta, but the stratagem backfires, since Ta is attracted to Mei-li because of her wholesomeness. Ta and Mei-li quarrel; she takes her flower drum and leaves Club Chop Suey.

Act II: Several months pass, and Club Chop Suey has become even flashier ("Chop Suey"). Ta can not forget Mei-li, and his uncle Chin (a janitor under the new regime) advises Ta to pursue her ("My Best Love"). He finds her in a fortune cookie factory working alongside Chao. Mei-li tells Ta that she and Chao have decided to return to China together, or at least to Hong Kong, then administered by the British. Meanwhile, Wang now finds himself attracted to Madam Liang, and the two have dinner together, though they decide not to marry ("Don't Marry Me"). They marry anyway.

Linda announces that she is leaving for Los Angeles, as Wang's "Sammy Fong" act has effectively taken over the show, and she has received a better offer. Ta intercepts Mei-li at the docks and persuades her to remain in America; Ta leaves Club Chop Suey and the two become street performers as Chao departs for Hong Kong. Harvard announces his intention to return home and attempt a reconciliation with his disappointed parents. Despite his irritation at Ta, Wang allows him to marry Mei-li at the club (which now features Ta's Chinese opera one day a week), as the company celebrates how Chinese and American cultures have converged to create this happy moment (Finale: "A Hundred Million Miracles").

== Critical reception ==
=== Original productions ===
Of the seven major New York newspaper drama reviewers, five gave the show very positive reviews. For example, New York Journal American critic John McClain stated, "Flower Drum Song is a big fat Rodgers and Hammerstein hit, and nothing written here will have the slightest effect on the proceeds." The New York Daily Mirror termed it, "Another notable work by the outstanding craftsmen of our musical theatre ... a lovely show, an outstanding one in theme and treatment." Less enthusiastic, however, was the longtime New York Times critic, Brooks Atkinson, who repeatedly described it as merely "pleasant". UPI's drama critic, Jack Gaver, scored it as "well north of Me and Juliet and Pipe Dream" but "well south" of Oklahoma!, Carousel, South Pacific and even the team's first flop, Allegro. Ward Morehouse applauded Suzuki for having "a brassy voice and the assurance of a younger Ethel Merman" and termed the production "an excellent Broadway show" though "[p]erhaps it doesn't belong in the same world ... as The King and I and Carousel." Critic Kenneth Tynan, in The New Yorker magazine, alluded to the show The World of Suzie Wong in dismissing Flower Drum Song with the spoonerism, "a world of woozy song".

When the national tour of the show visited the city of its setting, most San Francisco reviewers gave the show very positive reviews, though the Oakland Tribune critic described the musical as one "which has little by way of witty dialogue, outstanding songs or vigorous choreography". Nevertheless, she called the touring production superior to the Broadway one.

=== 2002 revival ===
Michael Phillips of the Los Angeles Times called the show "wholly revised and gleefully self-aware ... a few tons short of a mega-musical – no fake helicopters here, no power ballads saccharine enough to stop Communism in its tracks." The Hollywood Reporter thought the revival was, "while not perfect, an exhilarating accomplishment". Variety called it "a bold theatrical operation, an artistic success".

Critics reviewing the New York production generally gave it poor reviews. Ben Brantley of The New York Times applauded the creative team's "honorable intentions" in bringing back a work thought to be "terminally out-of-date", but felt both the new Mei-li and the show in general lacked personality. Howard Kissel of the New York Daily News termed it "an entertaining, albeit vulgar revival", and Clive Barnes of the New York Post found it no more memorable than the earlier version. The review in Talkin' Broadway is scathing, criticizing Hwang's use of the songs and characters, and the orchestrations, and commenting: "Hwang's book lacks much of the charm, warmth, and wit of the original, and never takes the high road where the low road will do. ... Hwang felt it necessary to reduce the original, uniquely colorful story into just another backstager with a love triangle and lame jokes." Michael Kuchwara commented in his lukewarm review for Associated Press: "Then there's Linda Low's gay confidante, Harvard. Talk about stereotypes. If you are going to perpetuate one at least give him better jokes." On the other hand, both USA Today and Time magazine gave it positive reviews. The CurtainUp review was mostly positive and observed that Hwang and Longbottom "were able to keep numbers like 'Chop Suey' and milk it for its razzle-dazzle fun while using its condescending stereotyping as a springboard to satirize attitudes towards Asians." Brantley disagreed, writing, "because the show's satiric point of view is so muddled, there's no verve in such numbers, no joy in the performing of them."

In 2006, David Lewis compared the original script to Hwang's version:

History never completely goes away. Hwang's champions are unlikely to fade away, either, in rhetorical defeat. Dick and Oscar and Joe mined C. Y. Lee's novel for the generational conflict and for the three women who substantiated Ta's honorable search for love. Those themes, like it or not, still resonate today.

== Music and recordings ==
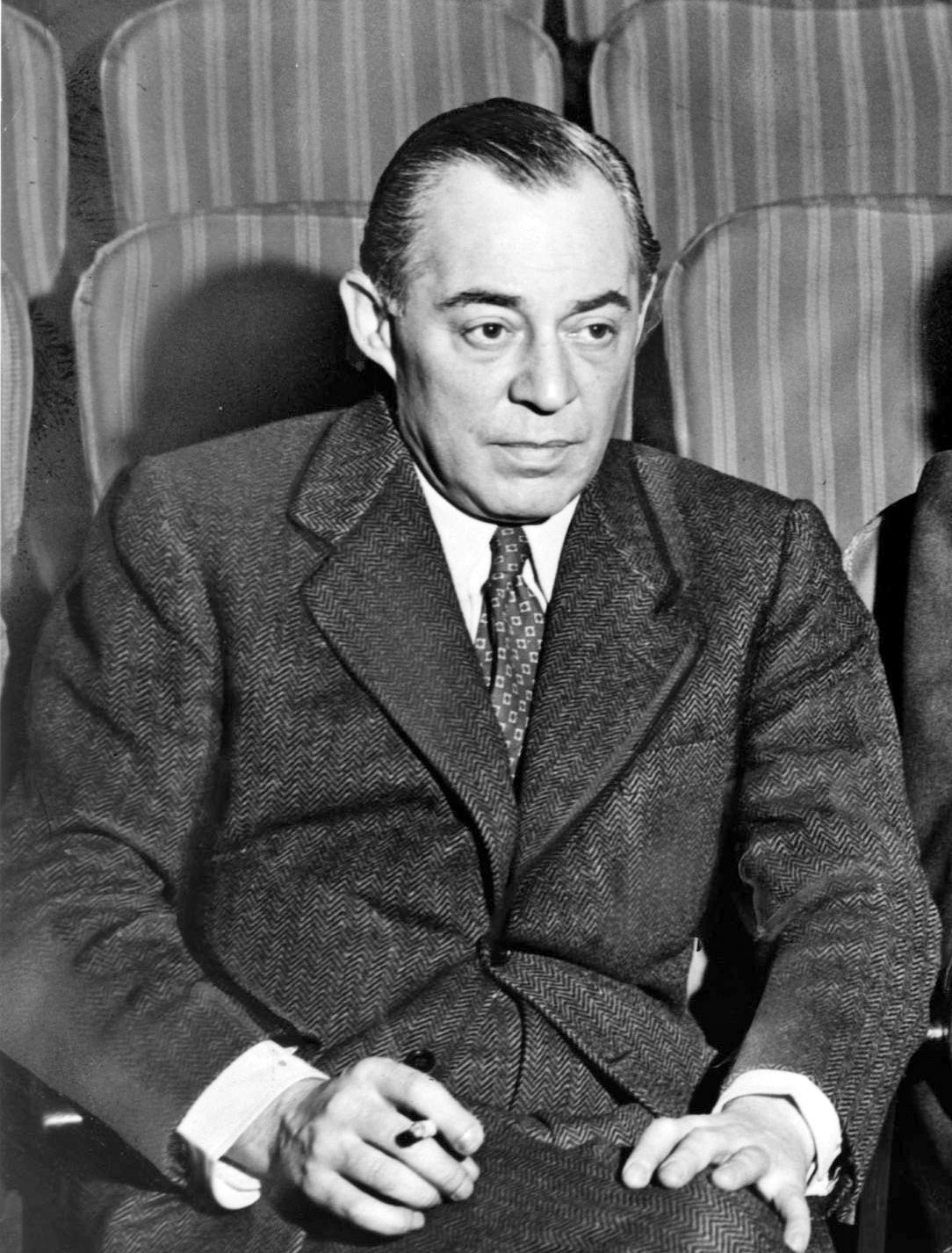
Richard Rodgers

Rodgers and Hammerstein sought to give the new work an Eastern flavor, without using existing oriental music. According to Ben Brantley in his review of the 2002 Broadway revival, the use by Rodgers "of repetitive Eastern musical structures gives the numbers a sing-song catchiness that, for better or worse, exerts a sticky hold on the memory." The most oriental-sounding song in the work is "A Hundred Million Miracles", which provides the eight-note drumbeat which is the musical signature of the work from overture to curtain. Hammerstein wrote Mei Li's first act song, "I Am Going to Like It Here", in a Malaysian poetic form called pantoum in which the second and fourth lines of each stanza become the first and third lines of the next. One critic thought that the 2001 version's orchestrations "boast more Asian accents and a jazzier edge than the original", but another felt that they "pale in comparison" to Bennett's typically lilting sound.

As with many of Rodgers and Hammerstein's musicals, the work features a ballet at the start of the second act, choreographed in the original production by Carol Haney. The ballet dramatizes the confused romantic longings of Wang Ta towards the women in his life, and ends as he awakens in Helen Chao's bed. Thomas Hischak, in his The Rodgers and Hammerstein Encyclopedia, notes that the ballets in Oklahoma! and Carousel (choreographed by Agnes de Mille) broke new ground in illustrating facets of the characters beyond what is learned in songs and dialogue, but describes the ballet in Flower Drum Song as "pleasant but not memorable". Although Hischak describes Rodgers as "the greatest waltz composer America has ever seen", Flower Drum Song was the first Rodgers and Hammerstein musical not to feature one.

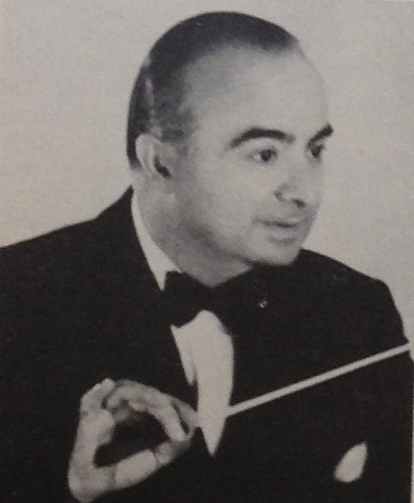
Salvatore Dell'Isola won a Tony in 1958 as music director and conducted the cast album.

Several of the characters are given "I am" songs that introduce them to the audience, allowing the character to express his dreams or desires and for onlookers to establish empathy with the character. Linda Low, for example, expresses her self-confidence with "I Enjoy Being a Girl"; we learn Mei Li's hopes with the quieter "I Am Going to Like It Here". Although not a formal musical number, the brief "You Be the Rock, I'll Be the Roll", sung and danced by Linda and by Wang San, Ta's Americanized teenage brother, was described by Lewis as "virtually the first self-consciously rock and roll ditty ever sung" in a Broadway musical. Patrick Adiarte, who originated the role of Wang San, however, saw it as "corny stuff ... put in there to get a laugh". Helen Chao's sad "Love, Look Away" is described by Lewis as "arguably the most tautly crafted blues song Dick and Oscar ever wrote".

Having decided that record companies were profiting more from the sales of their cast albums than they were, Rodgers and Hammerstein formed their own record company to produce the cast recording for the original production of Flower Drum Song. The album sold a relatively modest 300,000 copies, compared with sales of over a million copies for Rodgers and Hammerstein's next and final musical, The Sound of Music. Still, it was certified as a gold record for having at least a million dollars in sales, and it spent 67 weeks in the U.S. Top 40, three of them at number 1, and also did well in the UK when the show opened there in 1960. The original cast album is relatively complete, even including parts of the Wedding Parade, though it does not include the ballet.

In 1960, the London cast recording was released. According to Hischak, the individual performers do not sing as well as the New York cast; the London recording's strong points are the nightclub numbers. The 1961 album from the film uses a larger orchestra and, according to Hischak, has a fuller sound than the Broadway recording. It features dubbing by the opera singer Marilyn Horne ("Love, Look Away") and band singer B. J. Baker (for Linda Low's songs). A cast album for Hwang's revision was released in 2002 featuring strong performances from Lea Salonga as Mei-li and Jose Llana as Wang Ta. This was nominated for a Grammy, though it did not win. Hischak notes that it is unfair to compare the later version with its earlier predecessors, as Hwang's version "has some of the dark corners and richness of a musical play".

== Musical numbers (original version) ==
Act I

- Overture
- You Are Beautiful – Ta and Madam Liang
- A Hundred Million Miracles – Mei Li, Dr. Li, Wang, Madam Liang and Liu Ma
- I Enjoy Being a Girl – Linda and Company
- I Am Going to Like It Here – Mei Li
- Like a God – Ta
- Chop Suey – Madam Liang, Wang and Ensemble
- Don't Marry Me – Sammy Fong and Mei Li
- Grant Avenue – Linda and Ensemble
- Love, Look Away – Helen
- Fan Tan Fannie – Frankie and Girls
- Gliding Through My Memories – Frankie and Girls
- Finale: Grant Avenue – Linda and Girls

Act II

- Ballet
- Love, Look Away (Reprise) – Helen
- The Other Generation – Madam Liang and Wang
- Sunday – Linda and Sammy Fong
- The Other Generation (Reprise) – Wang San and Children
- Wedding Parade – Mei Li and Dancers
- Finale – Company

The 2002 revival restored "My Best Love", a song that was cut from the original production, which is sung by Chin. "The Other Generation" was cut from the revival.

== Cast ==
The principal casts of major productions of the musical (and of the film) have been as follows:

| | Mei Li | Linda Low | Wang Chi-yang | Wang Ta | Madam Liang | Sammy Fong | Helen Chao | Frankie Wing |
|---|---|---|---|---|---|---|---|---|
| 1958 Broadway | Miyoshi Umeki | Pat Suzuki | Keye Luke | Ed Kenney | Juanita Hall | Larry Blyden | Arabella Hong | Jack Soo |
| 1960 London | Yau Shan Tung | Yama Saki | George Minami | Kevin Scott | Ida Shepley | Tim Herbert | Joan Pethers | Leon Thau |
| 1961 film | Miyoshi Umeki | Nancy Kwan* | Benson Fong | James Shigeta | Juanita Hall | Jack Soo | Reiko Sato* | Victor Sen Yung |
| 2002 Broadway | Lea Salonga | Sandra Allen | Randall Duk Kim | Jose Llana | Jodi Long | – | – | – |

*Linda Low's singing voice was dubbed by B. J. Baker, and Chao's "Love, Look Away" was dubbed by Marilyn Horne.
Dashes indicate roles cut from 2002 production. The 2002 production also featured Alvin Ing as Chin, Allen Liu as Harvard and Hoon Lee as Chao.

== Awards and nominations ==
=== Original Broadway production ===
| Year | Award | Category | Nominee | Result | Ref |
|---|---|---|---|---|---|
| 1958 | Tony Award | Best Musical | | Nominated | |
| 1958 | Tony Award | Best Performance by a Leading Actor in a Musical | Larry Blyden | Nominated | |
| 1958 | Tony Award | Best Performance by a Leading Actress in a Musical | Miyoshi Umeki | Nominated | |
| 1958 | Tony Award | Best Choreography | Carol Haney | Nominated | |
| 1958 | Tony Award | Best Conductor and Musical Director | Salvatore Dell'Isola | Won | |
| 1958 | Tony Award | Best Costume Design | Irene Sharaff | Nominated | |

=== 2002 Broadway revival ===
| Year | Award | Category | Nominee | Result | Ref |
|---|---|---|---|---|---|
| 2002 | Tony Award | Best Book of a Musical | David Henry Hwang | Nominated | |
| 2002 | Tony Award | Best Choreography | Robert Longbottom | Nominated | |
| 2002 | Tony Award | Best Costume Design | Gregg Barnes | Nominated | |
| 2004 | Grammy Award | Best Musical Show Album | | Nominated | |
