= Chin Yang Lee =

American writer and journalist

- 黎錦揚
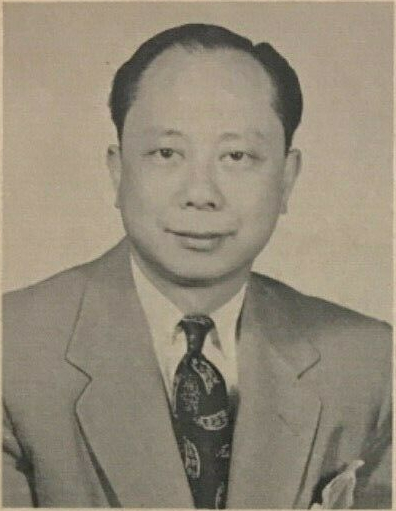
- Lee in c. 1957
- Pronunciation: Lí Jǐnyáng
- Born: December 23, 1915; Xiangtan, Hunan, Republic of China
- Died: November 8, 2018 (aged 102); Los Angeles, California, U.S.
- Citizenship: United States
- Education: Master of Fine Arts; Bachelor of Arts
- Alma mater: Yale University; National Southwestern Associated University
- Known for: The Flower Drum Song
- Spouse: Joyce Lackey (m. 1963; died 1997)

Chinese name
- Traditional Chinese: 黎錦揚
- Simplified Chinese: 黎锦扬
Transcriptions
Standard Mandarin
- Hanyu Pinyin: Lí Jǐnyáng
- Wade–Giles: Li Chin-yang

Signature (Chinese)
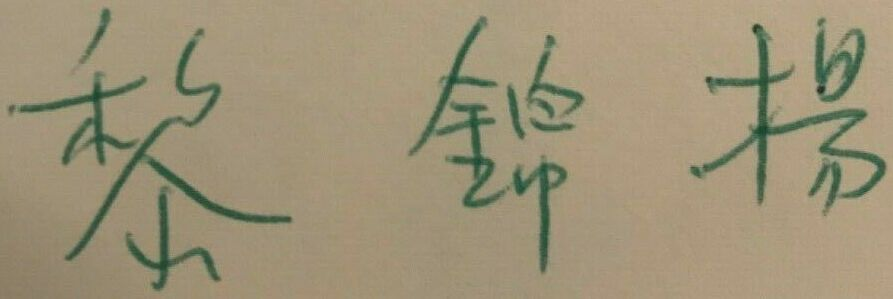

Signature
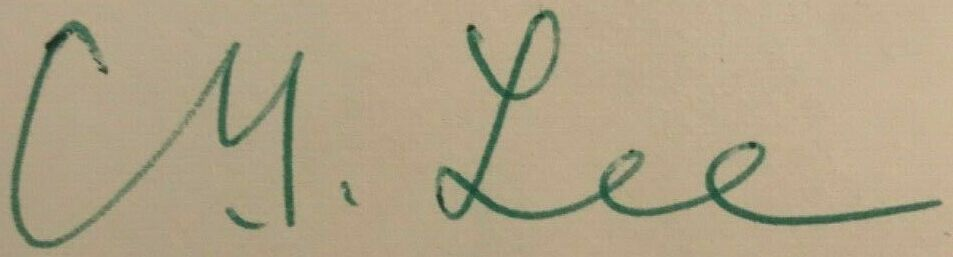

Chin Yang Lee (Chinese: 黎錦揚; pinyin: Lí Jǐnyáng; December 23, 1915 – November 8, 2018) was a Chinese-American author best known for his 1957 novel The Flower Drum Song, which inspired the Rodgers and Hammerstein musical Flower Drum Song and the eponymous 1961 film which was nominated for five Academy Awards.

== Early life ==
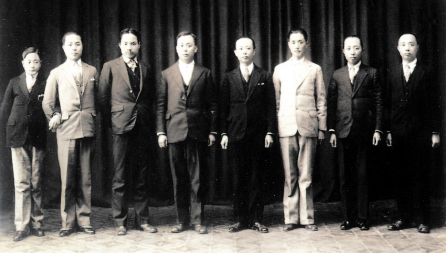
The eight Li brothers in Beijing, 1930. C.Y. Lee (left) was the youngest.

Chin Yang Lee (Li Jinyang) was born in 1915 into a scholarly family in Xiangtan, Hunan, China, the youngest of the eight Li brothers who all achieved national or international fame. His eldest brother, Li Jinxi, was the "father of the Chinese phonetic alphabet" and teacher of Mao Zedong. The second oldest, Li Jinhui, was a pioneering musician considered the "father of Chinese popular music".

He earned a Bachelor of Arts degree from National Southwestern Associated University in 1942. He then worked as a secretary for chiefdom of Mangshi at the China–Burma border.

In 1943, during the Second Sino-Japanese War, Lee emigrated to the United States. After briefly attending Columbia University, Lee transferred to Yale to study playwriting with a professor who had taught Eugene O'Neill, Lee's favorite playwright, earning a Master of Fine Arts degree in playwriting from Yale University in 1947.

== Career ==
After Yale, Lee moved to Chinatown, Los Angeles. Lee violated the law by taking a part-time job, in Los Angeles, for the San Francisco daily newspaper, Chinese World, originally established in 1892, as the Mon Hing Yat Bo, jeopardizing his immigration status. The editor of the San Francisco-based Chinese World invited him to move to San Francisco and work full time for both the English and Chinese editions.

In the early 1950s, Lee was a journalist living in Chinatown, San Francisco, and working for San Francisco Chinatown newspapers, Chinese World and, later, Young China.

== The Flower Drum Song ==
By the 1950s, Lee was making a living writing short stories and working as a Chinese teacher, translator and journalist for San Francisco Chinatown newspapers. He had hoped to break into playwriting, but instead wrote a novel about Chinatown, The Flower Drum Song (originally titled Grant Avenue, expanded from a short story to a novel), written while living above a Filipino night club on Kearny Street. Lee initially had no success selling his novel, but his agent submitted it to the publishing house of Farrar, Straus and Cudahy. The firm sent the manuscript to an elderly reader for evaluation. The reader was found dead in bed, the manuscript beside him with the words "Read this" scrawled on it. The publishing house did so, and bought Lee's novel, which became a bestseller in 1957.

The novel, about generational conflict within an Asian American family over an arranged marriage in San Francisco's Chinatown, was adapted into the Rodgers and Hammerstein musical Flower Drum Song, opening in 1958. The original production was the first Broadway show to feature Asian American players. The 1961 film jump-started the careers of the first generation of Asian American actors, including Nancy Kwan, James Shigeta, and Jack Soo. Lee was interviewed on the 2006 DVD release of the movie.

On October 2, 2001, the Mark Taper Forum in Los Angeles premiered David Henry Hwang's adaptation of Rodgers and Hammerstein's Flower Drum Song to glowing reviews, in the first major theatrical production that had an all-Asian cast of actors and voices. Its initial run was extended, and after several months, the production moved to Broadway, where the reviews were less than stellar. Lee had worked with Hwang on the rewriting of the musical.

== Personal life ==
Lee married Joyce Lackey, an American writer, in 1963. They had two children, Angela and Jay. Joyce died in 1997. In his later life, Lee lived in Alhambra, California. On November 8, 2018, he died of kidney failure in Los Angeles, at the age of 102.

== Works ==
- 10,000 Apologies (2006)

=== Novels ===
- The Flower Drum Song (1957)
- Lover's Point (1958)
- The Sawbwa and His Secretary (1959)
- Madame Goldenflower (1960), Farrar Straus & Cudahy
- Cripple Mah and the New Order (1961)
- The Virgin Market (1964)
- The Land of the Golden Mountain (1967)
- The Days of the Tong Wars (1974)
- China Saga (1987), Grove Press, ISBN 1-55584-056-6
- The Second Son of Heaven (1990), William Morrow, ISBN 0-688-05140-5
- Gate of Rage: A Novel of One Family Trapped by the Events at Tiananmen Square (1991), William Morrow, ISBN 0-688-09764-2

=== Short stories ===
Many of Lee's short stories were published by the New Yorker magazine after the success of his first novel:

- "A Man of Habit"
- "Sawbwa Fang And The Communist"
- "Sawbwa's Domestic Quarrel"
- "Sawbwa Fang's Sense of Justice"
- "Sawbwa Fang, Dr. Streppone, And The Leeches"

=== Plays ===
- Mama From China (2004)

== Sources ==
- The Chronology of American Literature (2004), edited by Daniel S. Burt. Published by Houghton Mifflin Company.
