= The Flower Drum Song =

1957 novel by C. Y. Lee

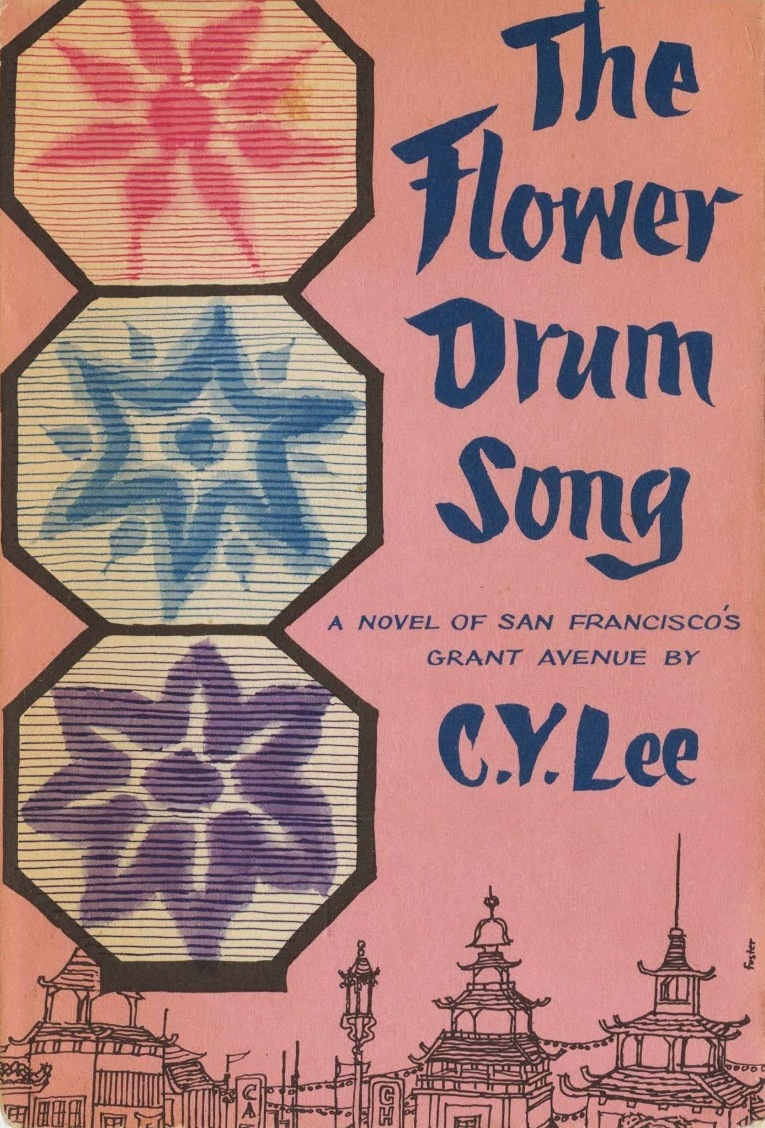
- First edition (publ. Farrar, Straus and Cudahy)
- Author: C. Y. Lee
- Language: English
- Publisher: Farrar, Straus and Cudahy
- Publication date: 1957
- LC Class: PZ4.L4772 Fl

The Flower Drum Song is a novel by Chinese-American author C. Y. Lee, first published in 1957. The novel tells the story of Chinese immigrants in San Francisco, and was a bestseller in its time. It is the basis of 1958 musical Flower Drum Song, and later a movie of the same title was released in 1961, starring Nancy Kwan and James Shigeta.

== Background ==
Author C. Y. Lee fled the Chinese Civil War in the 1940s and came to the United States, where he attended Yale University's playwriting program, graduating in 1947 with a Master of Fine Arts degree. By the 1950s, he was barely making a living writing short stories and working as a Chinese teacher, translator and journalist for San Francisco Chinatown newspapers. He had hoped to break into playwriting, but instead wrote a novel about Chinatown, The Flower Drum Song (originally titled Grant Avenue). Lee initially had no success selling his novel, but his agent submitted it to the publishing house of Farrar, Straus and Cudahy. The firm sent the manuscript to an elderly reader for evaluation; he was subsequently found dead in bed, the manuscript beside him with the words "Read this" scrawled on it. The publishing house did so, and bought Lee's novel, which became a bestseller in 1957.

== Synopsis ==
Lee's novel centers on Wang Chi-yang, a 63-year-old man who fled China to avoid the communists. The wealthy refugee lives in a house in the Chinatown district of San Francisco with his two sons. A regular visitor to the household is his sister-in-law Madam Tang, who is taking citizenship classes and urges Wang to adopt Western ways. While his sons and sister-in-law are integrating into American culture, Wang stubbornly resists assimilation and speaks only two words of English, "yes" and "no". Wang also has a severe cough, which he does not wish to have cured, feeling that it gives him authority in his household. Wang's elder son, Wang Ta, woos Linda Tung, but on learning that she has many men in her life, drops her; he later learns she is a nightclub dancer. Linda's friend, seamstress Helen Chao, who has been unable to find a man despite the shortage of eligible women in Chinatown, gets Ta drunk and seduces him. On awakening in her bed, he agrees to an affair, but eventually abandons her, and she commits suicide.

Impatient at Ta's inability to find a wife, Wang arranges for a picture bride for his son. However, before the new bride arrives, Ta meets a young woman, May Li, who with her father has recently come to San Francisco. The two support themselves by singing depressing songs on the street. With his father's approval, Ta invites the two into the Wang household, and he and May Li fall in love. He vows to marry her after she is falsely accused by the household servants of stealing a clock, though his father stands in opposition. Wang struggles to understand the conflicts that have torn his household apart; his hostility toward assimilation is isolating him from his family. In the end, taking his son's advice, Wang decides not to go to the herbalist to seek a remedy for his cough, but instead enters a Chinese-run Western clinic, symbolizing the beginning of his acceptance of American culture.
