= 30th Academy Awards =

- Date: March 26, 1958
- Site: RKO Pantages Theatre, Hollywood, California, United States
- Hosted by: Bob Hope; Rosalind Russell; David Niven; James Stewart; Jack Lemmon; Donald Duck (voice of Clarence Nash by premade animation)
- Produced by: Jerry Wald
- Directed by: Trevor Newman

Highlights
- Best Picture: The Bridge on the River Kwai
- Most awards: The Bridge on the River Kwai (7)
- Most nominations: Sayonara (10)

TV in the United States
- Network: NBC

The 30th Academy Awards ceremony was held on March 26, 1958, to honor the best films of 1957.

Two violent deaths surrounded the Oscars during this ceremony. A plane crash took the life of producer Mike Todd, ending the then-latest marriage of Elizabeth Taylor, at that time a contender for the film Raintree County. Lana Turner, in the running for Peyton Place, would soon be embroiled in a major scandal when Johnny Stompanato, her boyfriend, was killed in her Beverly Hills home. The Best Actress award, however, was won by a relative newcomer, Joanne Woodward, who made her own dress for the occasion, causing presenter Joan Crawford to remark that she was "setting the cause of Hollywood glamour back twenty years by making her own clothes".

As in the previous year, the blacklisting of certain writers led to anomalies in the writing awards. The Academy Award for Best Screenplay Based on Material from Another Medium was awarded to Pierre Boulle for The Bridge on the River Kwai, despite the fact that he did not speak English, because the actual writers, Carl Foreman and Michael Wilson, were blacklisted at the time and had not received screen credit. Foreman and Wilson have since been acknowledged by the academy as the true recipients of the award, though Boulle remains listed as an official winner.

Bob Hope hosted the event, greeting the crowd saying, "Thank you, comrades" and adding they were "the nicest group of filthy capitalists I've ever seen." Hope joked about staying at a hotel in Moscow during his goodwill tour there where "they have TV in every room, only it watches you." Kim Novak accepted the writing award for Boulle, saying that her late boss Harry Cohn was "very, very proud of this film, Bridge on the River Kwai, as all of us at Columbia are."

Peyton Place tied the record for the most nominations without a win (9) set by The Little Foxes (1941). This record would stand until 1977 when The Turning Point received 11 nominations without a win, which is the record to date (The Color Purple tied the record in 1985). Peyton Place also set the record for most unsuccessful acting nominations, with five; this record has been tied once, by Tom Jones at the 36th Academy Awards.

For the first time in Oscar history, during the time period (1944–2008) when Best Picture was limited to five nominees, the Best Director nominees aligned completely with the Best Picture nominees. This would only occur four more times before the Best Picture category's re-expansion in 2009. As of the 97th Academy Awards, Designing Woman is the last film to win the Oscar for Best Original Screenplay when nominated solely in that category.

== Awards ==
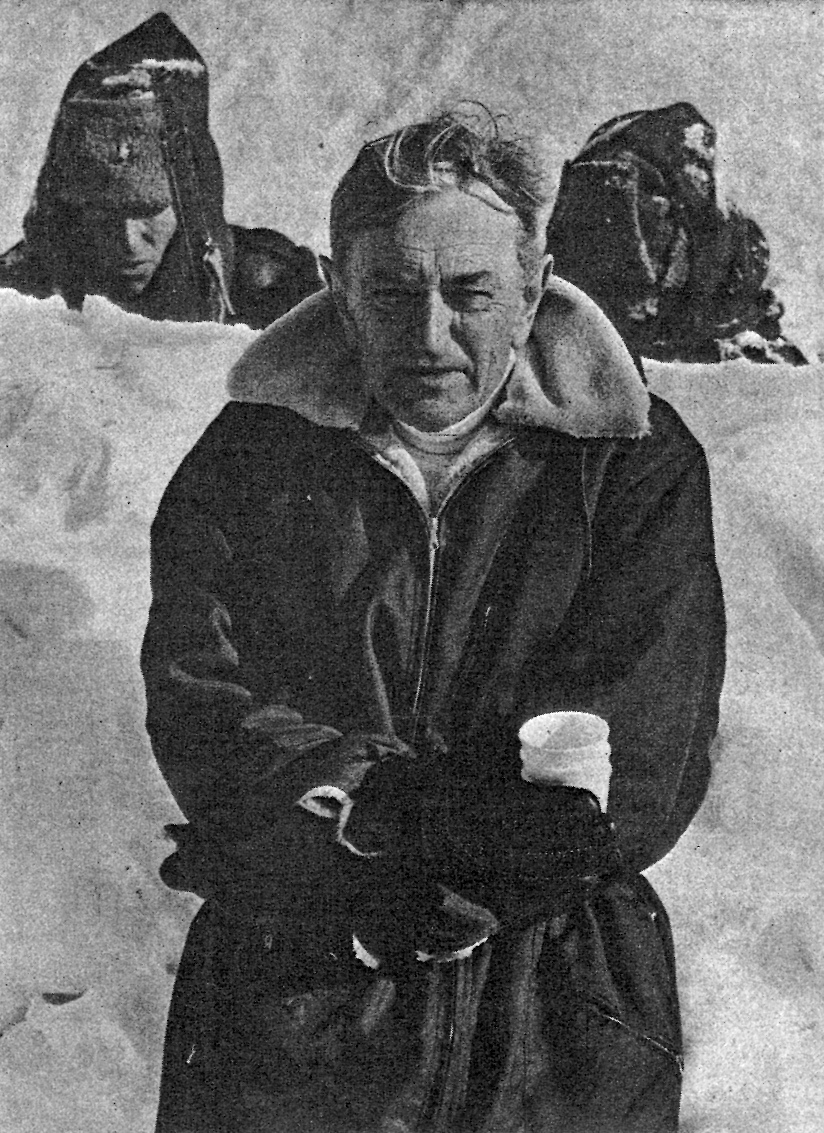
David Lean; Best Director winner

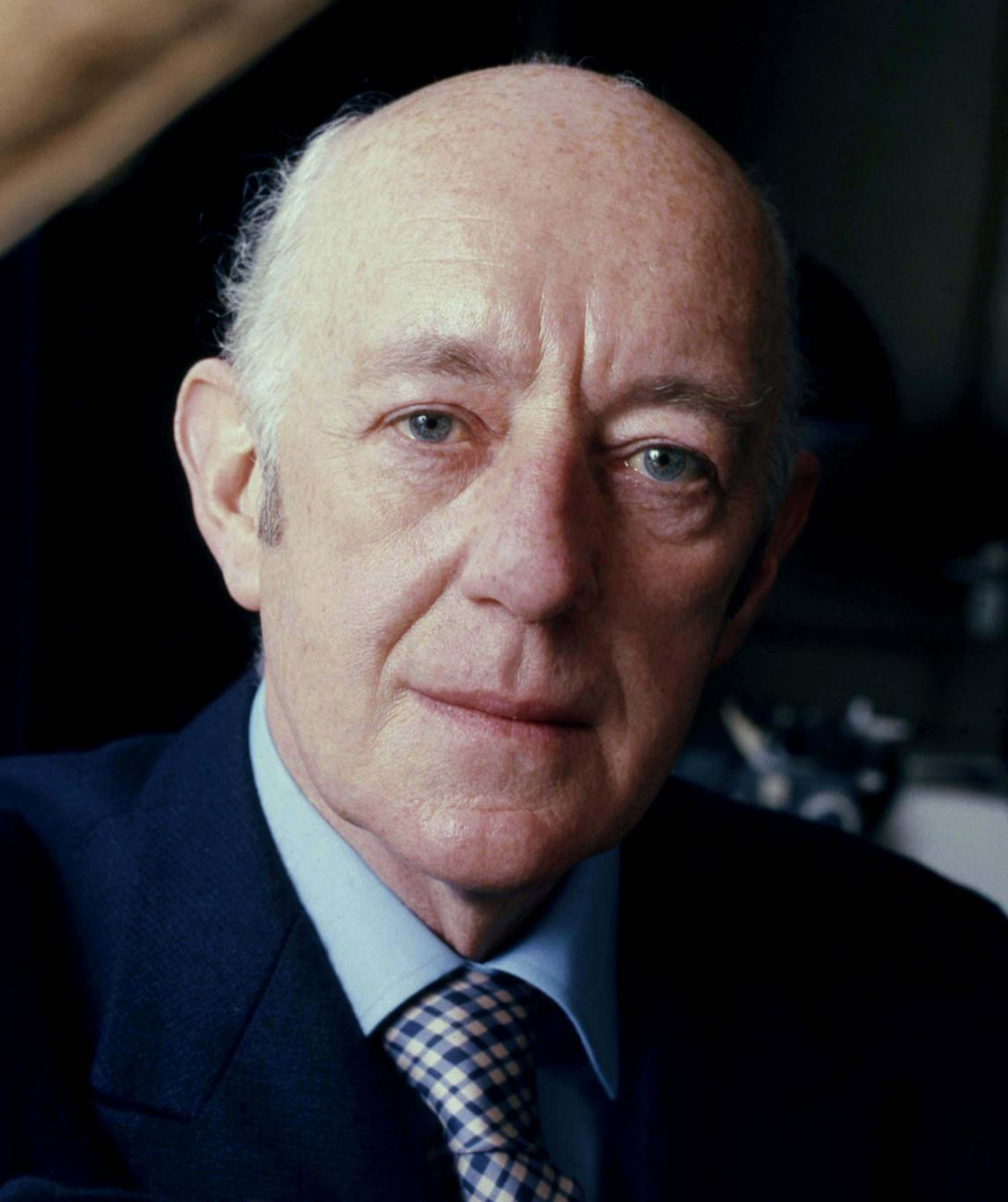
Alec Guinness; Best Actor winner

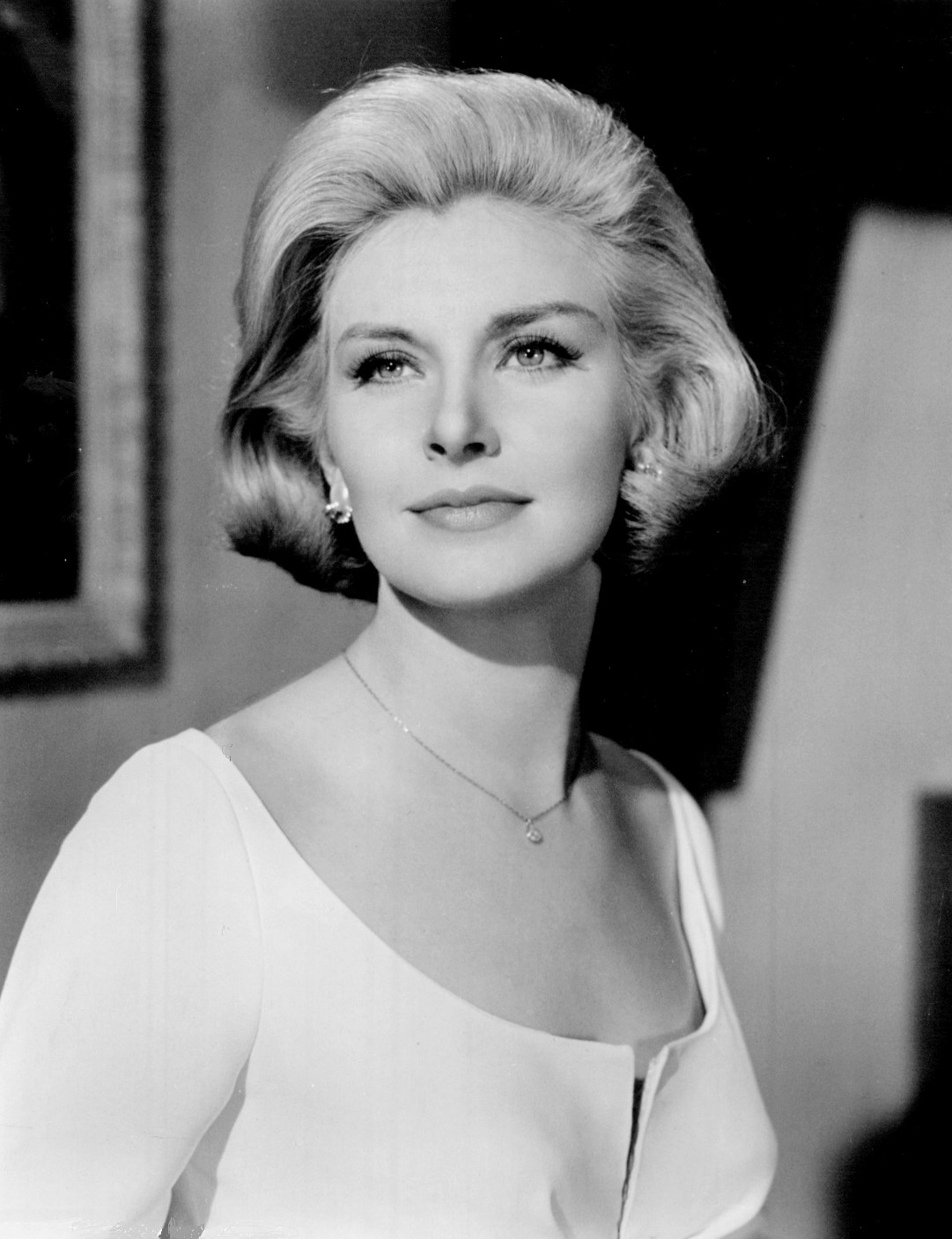
Joanne Woodward; Best Actress winner

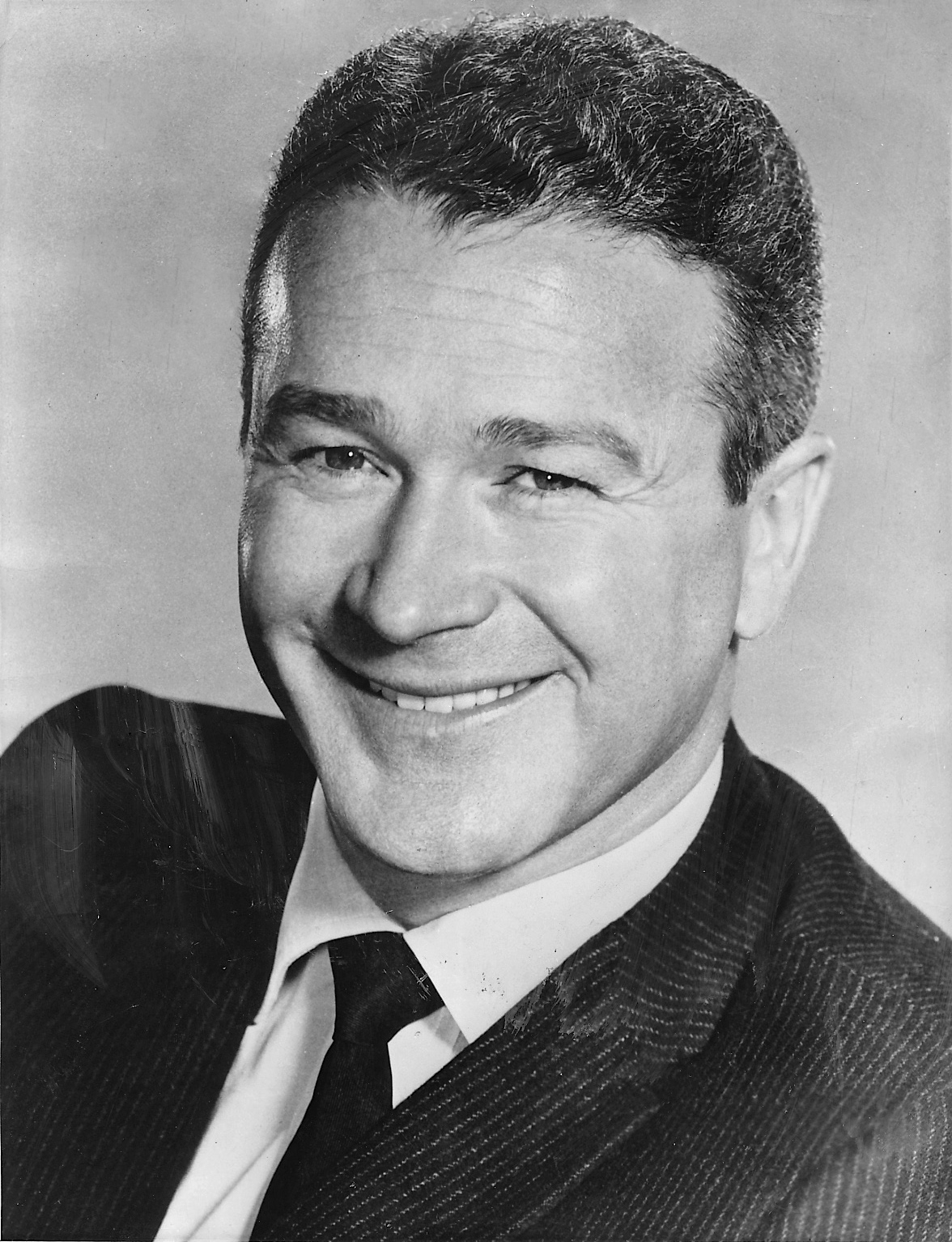
Red Buttons; Best Supporting Actor winner

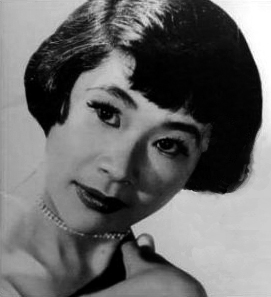
Miyoshi Umeki; Best Supporting Actress winner

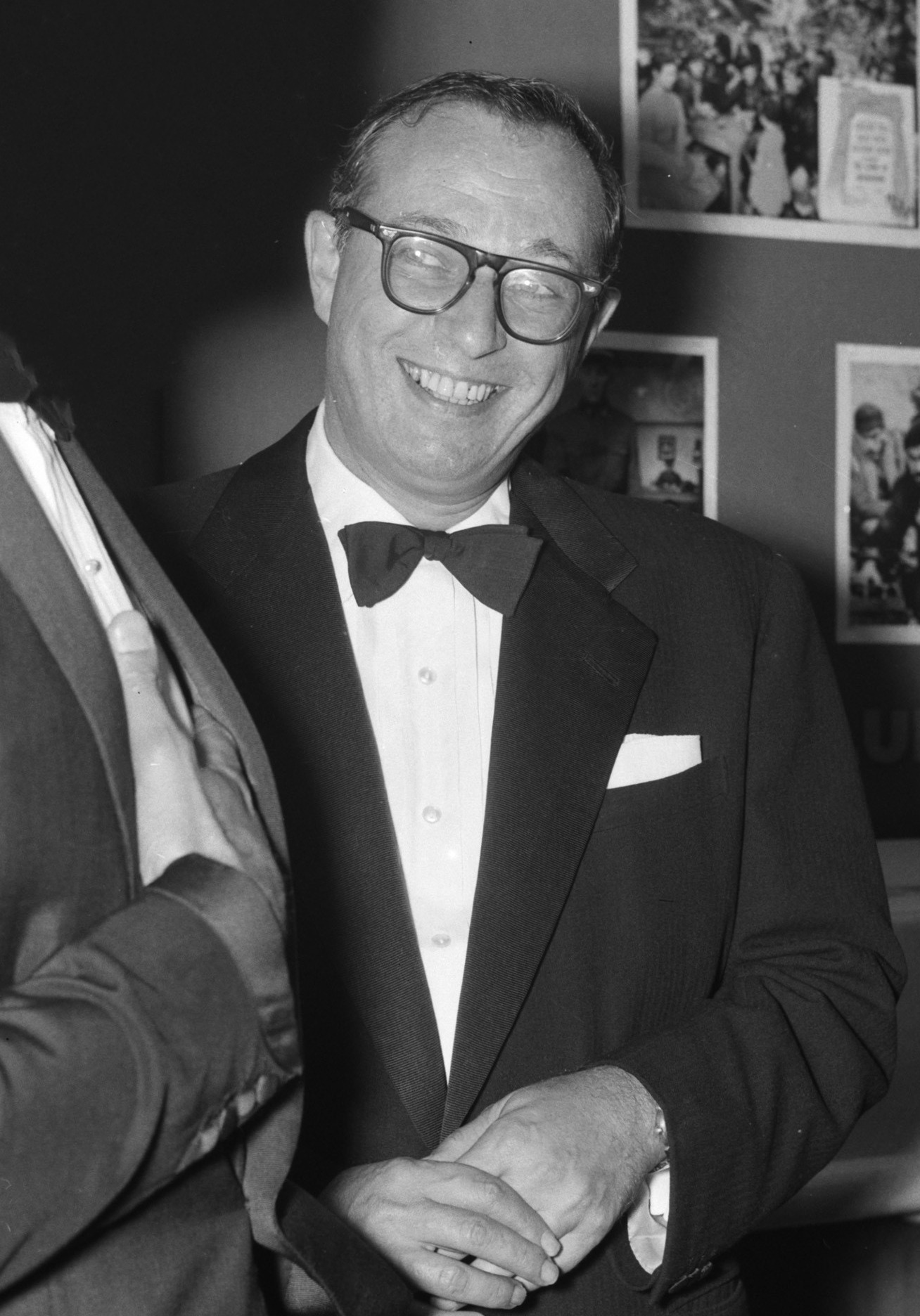
Carl Foreman; Best Adapted Screenplay co-winner

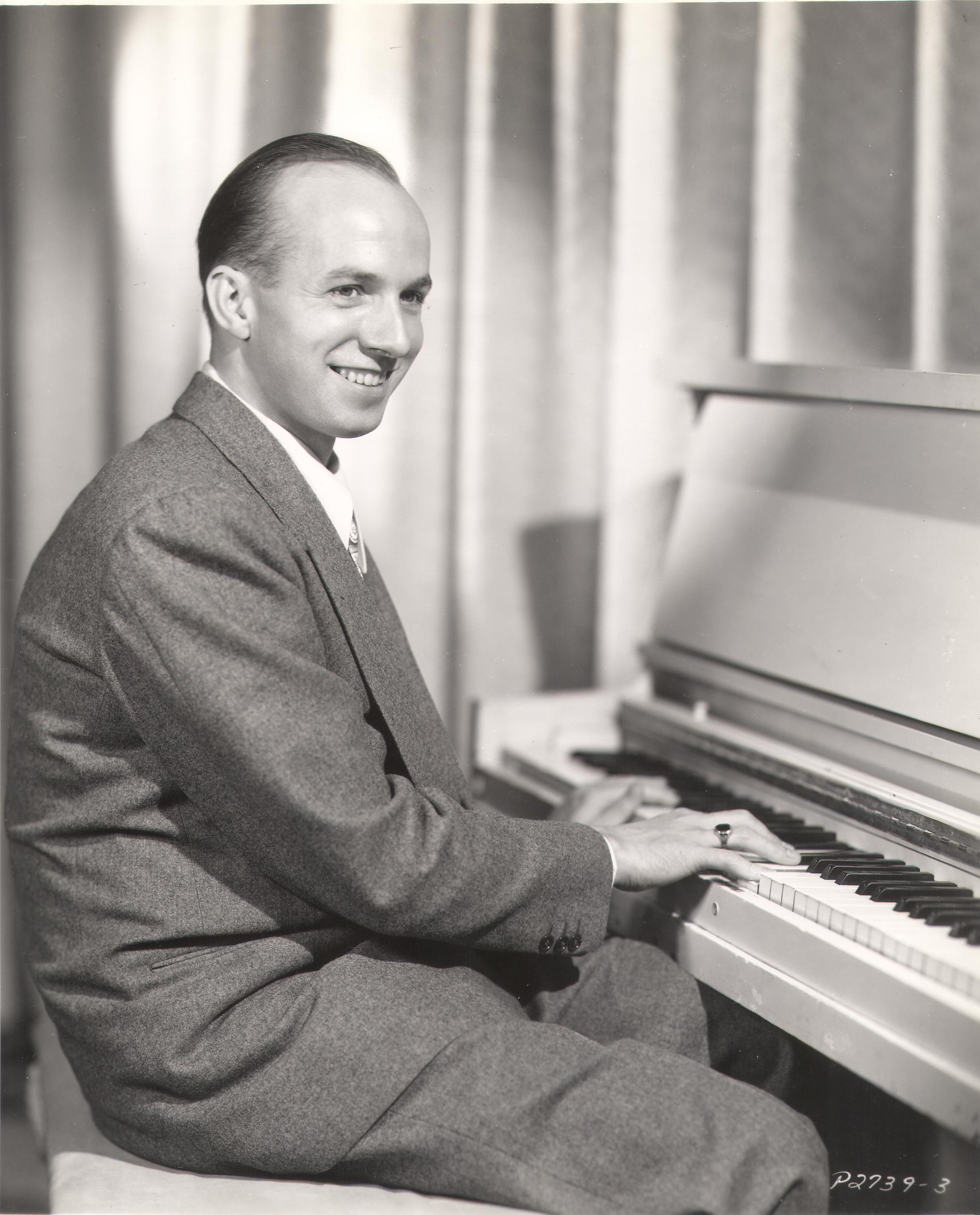
Jimmy Van Heusen; Best Original Song co-winner

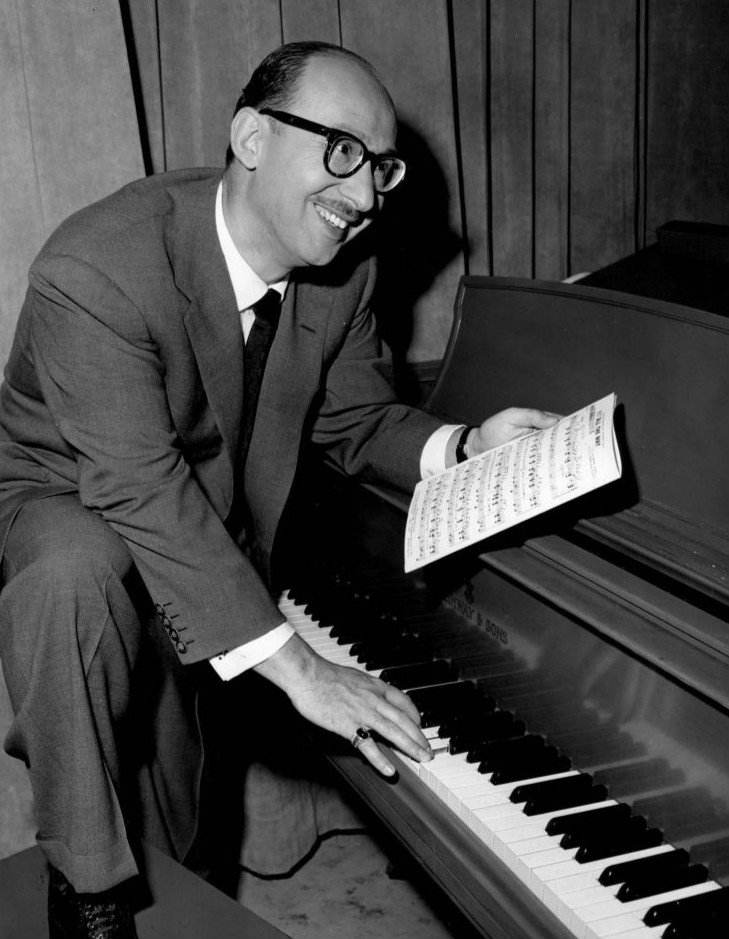
Sammy Cahn; Best Original Song co-winner

Nominees were announced on February 18, 1958. Winners are listed first and highlighted in boldface.

**Best Motion Picture**: **The Bridge on the River Kwai – Sam Spiegel, producer**; 12 Angry Men – Henry Fonda and Reginald Rose, producers; Peyton Place – Jerry Wald, producer; Sayonara – William Goetz, producer; Witness for the Prosecution – Arthur Hornblow Jr., producer	**Best Directing**: **David Lean – The Bridge on the River Kwai**; Sidney Lumet – 12 Angry Men; Mark Robson – Peyton Place; Joshua Logan – Sayonara; Billy Wilder – Witness for the Prosecution
**Best Actor**: **Alec Guinness – The Bridge on the River Kwai as Colonel Nicholson**; Marlon Brando – Sayonara as Major Lloyd "Ace" Gruver; Anthony Franciosa – A Hatful of Rain as Polo Pope; Charles Laughton – Witness for the Prosecution as Sir Wilfrid Robarts Q.C.; Anthony Quinn – Wild Is the Wind as Gino	**Best Actress**: **Joanne Woodward – The Three Faces of Eve as Eve White/Eve Black/Jane**; Deborah Kerr – Heaven Knows, Mr. Allison as Sister Angela; Anna Magnani – Wild Is the Wind as Gioia; Elizabeth Taylor – Raintree County as Susanna Drake; Lana Turner – Peyton Place as Constance MacKenzie
**Best Actor in a Supporting Role**: **Red Buttons – Sayonara as Airman Joe Kelly**; Vittorio De Sica – A Farewell to Arms as Major Alessandro Rinaldi; Sessue Hayakawa – The Bridge on the River Kwai as Colonel Saito; Arthur Kennedy – Peyton Place as Lucas Cross; Russ Tamblyn – Peyton Place as Norman Page	**Best Actress in a Supporting Role**: **Miyoshi Umeki – Sayonara as Katsumi Kelly**; Carolyn Jones – The Bachelor Party as The Girl; Elsa Lanchester – Witness for the Prosecution as Miss Plimsoll; Hope Lange – Peyton Place as Selena Cross; Diane Varsi – Peyton Place as Allison MacKenzie
**Best Writing (Story and Screenplay -- Written Directly for the Screen)**: **Designing Woman – George Wells**; Funny Face – Leonard Gershe; I Vitelloni – Federico Fellini, Tullio Pinelli and Ennio Flaiano; Man of a Thousand Faces – Ralph Wheelwright, R. Wright Campbell, Ivan Goff and Ben Roberts; The Tin Star – Barney Slater, Joel Kane and Dudley Nichols	**Best Writing (Screenplay -- Based on Material from Another Medium)**: **The Bridge on the River Kwai – Michael Wilson, Carl Foreman and Pierre Boulle based on the novel by Pierre Boulle**; 12 Angry Men – Reginald Rose based on his teleplay; Heaven Knows, Mr. Allison – John Lee Mahin and John Huston from the novel by Charles Shaw; Peyton Place – John Michael Hayes based on the novel by Grace Metalious; Sayonara – Paul Osborn based on the novel by James Michener
**Best Foreign Language Film**: **Nights of Cabiria (Italy)**; Mother India (India); The Devil Strikes at Night (West Germany); Gates of Paris (France); Nine Lives (Norway)	**Best Documentary (Feature)**: **Albert Schweitzer – Jerome Hill**; On the Bowery – Lionel Rogosin; Torero! – Manuel Barbachano Ponce
**Best Short Subject (Live Action)**: **The Wetback Hound – Larry Lansburgh**; A Chairy Tale – Norman McLaren; City of Gold – Tom Daly; Foothold on Antarctica – James Carr; Portugal – Ben Sharpsteen	**Best Short Subject (Cartoon)**: **Birds Anonymous – Edward Selzer**; One Droopy Knight – William Hanna and Joseph Barbera; Tabasco Road – Edward Selzer; Trees and Jamaica Daddy – Stephen Bosustow; The Truth About Mother Goose – Walt Disney
**Best Music (Scoring)**: **The Bridge on the River Kwai – Malcolm Arnold**; An Affair to Remember – Hugo Friedhofer; Boy on a Dolphin – Hugo Friedhofer; Perri – Paul J. Smith; Raintree County – Johnny Green	**Best Music (Song)**: **"All the Way" from The Joker Is Wild – Music by Jimmy Van Heusen; Lyrics by Sammy Cahn**; "An Affair to Remember" from An Affair to Remember – Music by Harry Warren; Lyrics by Leo McCarey and Harold Adamson; "April Love" from April Love – Music by Sammy Fain; Lyrics by Paul Francis Webster; "Tammy" from Tammy and the Bachelor – Music and Lyrics by Ray Evans and Johnny Livingston; "Wild Is the Wind" from Wild Is the Wind – Music by Dimitri Tiomkin; Lyrics by Ned Washington
**Best Sound Recording**: **Sayonara – George Groves**; Gunfight at the O.K. Corral – George Dutton; Les Girls – Wesley C. Miller; Pal Joey – John P. Livadary; Witness for the Prosecution – Gordon E. Sawyer	**Best Art Direction**: **Sayonara – Art Direction: Ted Haworth; Set Decoration: Robert Priestley**; Funny Face – Art Direction: Hal Pereira and George W. Davis; Set Decoration: Samuel M. Comer and Ray Moyer; Les Girls – Art Direction: William A. Horning and Gene Allen; Set Decoration: Edwin B. Willis and Richard Pefferle; Pal Joey – Art Direction: Walter Holscher; Set Decoration: William Kiernan and Louis Diage; Raintree County – Art Direction: William A. Horning and Urie McCleary; Set Decoration: Edwin B. Willis and Hugh Hunt
**Best Cinematography**: **The Bridge on the River Kwai – Jack Hildyard**; An Affair to Remember – Milton Krasner; Funny Face – Ray June; Peyton Place – William C. Mellor; Sayonara – Ellsworth Fredericks	**Best Costume Design**: **Les Girls – Orry-Kelly**; An Affair to Remember – Charles LeMaire; Funny Face – Edith Head and Hubert de Givenchy; Pal Joey – Jean Louis; Raintree County – Walter Plunkett
**Best Film Editing**: **The Bridge on the River Kwai – Peter Taylor**; Gunfight at the O.K. Corral – Warren Low; Pal Joey – Viola Lawrence and Jerome Thoms; Sayonara – Arthur P. Schmidt and Philip W. Anderson; Witness for the Prosecution – Daniel Mandell	**Best Special Effects**: **The Enemy Below – Walter Rossi**; The Spirit of St. Louis – Louis Lichtenfield

=== Honorary Awards ===
- To Charles Brackett for outstanding service to the Academy.
- To B. B. Kahane for distinguished service to the motion picture industry.
- To Gilbert M. "Broncho Billy" Anderson, motion picture pioneer, for his contributions to the development of motion pictures as entertainment.
- To The Society of Motion Picture and Television Engineers for their contributions to the advancement of the motion picture industry.

=== Jean Hersholt Humanitarian Award ===
- Samuel Goldwyn

== Presenters and performers ==
=== Presenters ===
- June Allyson (Presenter: Best Special Effects)
- Fred Astaire and Dana Wynter (Presenters: Best Foreign Language Film)
- Ernest Borgnine and Cyd Charisse (Presenters: Best Documentary)
- Joan Collins (Presenter: Cinematography Award)
- Gary Cooper (Presenter: Best Picture)
- Wendell Corey and Robert Ryan (Presenters: Costume Design Award)
- Bette Davis (Presenter: Honorary Awards)
- Doris Day and Clark Gable (Presenters: Writing Awards)
- Anita Ekberg and Vincent Price (Presenters: Best Scoring)
- Cary Grant (Presenter: Best Actor)
- Rock Hudson and Jennifer Jones (Presenters: Short Subjects Awards)
- Van Johnson and Dorothy Malone (Presenters: Best Sound Recording)
- Hope Lange and Ronald Reagan (Presenters: Scientific and Technical Awards)
- Sophia Loren (Presenter: Best Director)
- Paul Newman and Joanne Woodward (Presenters: Best Film Editing)
- Gregory Peck and Eva Marie Saint (Presenters: Best Art Direction)
- Anthony Quinn (Presenter: Best Supporting Actress)
- Lana Turner (Presenter: Best Supporting Actor)
- John Wayne (Presenter: Best Actress)

=== Performers ===
- Anna Maria Alberghetti, Ann Blyth, Shirley Jones, Tab Hunter, Jimmie Rodgers and Tommy Sands ("April Love" from April Love)
- Vic Damone ("An Affair to Remember" from An Affair to Remember)
- Kirk Douglas and Burt Lancaster ("It's Great Not to Be Nominated")
- Rock Hudson and Mae West ("Baby, It's Cold Outside")
- Dean Martin ("All the Way" from The Joker Is Wild)
- Johnny Mathis ("Wild Is the Wind" from Wild Is the Wind)
- Debbie Reynolds ("Tammy" from Tammy and the Bachelor)

== Multiple nominations and awards ==
Films with multiple nominations
Nominations	Film
10	Sayonara
9	Peyton Place
8	The Bridge on the River Kwai
6	Witness for the Prosecution
4	An Affair to Remember
4	Funny Face
4	Pal Joey
4	Raintree County
3	12 Angry Men
3	Les Girls
3	Wild is the Wind
2	Gunfight at the O.K. Corral
2	Heaven Knows, Mr. Allison

Films with multiple awards
Awards	Film
7	The Bridge on the River Kwai
4	Sayonara

== See also ==
- 15th Golden Globe Awards
- 1957 in film
- 9th Primetime Emmy Awards
- 10th Primetime Emmy Awards
- 11th British Academy Film Awards
- 12th Tony Awards
