= 1957 Academy Awards =

1957 Academy Awards may refer to:

- 29th Academy Awards, the Academy Awards ceremony that took place in 1957
- 30th Academy Awards, the 1958 ceremony honoring the best in film for 1957
