= Sayonara (novel) =

1953 novel by James A. Michener

- Cover of the first edition
- Author: James A. Michener
- Language: English
- Publisher: Random House
- Publication date: 1953
- Publication place: United States
- Media type: Print
- Pages: 243pp.

Sayonara (1954) is a novel published by American author James A. Michener. Set during the early 1950s, it tells the story of Major Gruver, an American soldier stationed in Japan, who falls in love with Hana-ogi, a Japanese performer. The novel follows their cross-cultural Japanese romance and illuminates the racism of the post-World War II time period.

== Plot summary ==
After shooting down his seventh MiG over Korea, Air Force Major Lloyd Gruver is recalled to lighter duties in Kobe, a transfer arranged by Brigadier General Mark Webster. On his way to collect his orders, he is told he will be accompanying Airman Joe Kelly, who has gone above his superiors to obtain special permission from his congressman to marry Katsumi, a Japanese citizen, despite contemporary laws which invalidate the marriage.

When they land in Kobe, Lloyd receives two surprises: Joe asks him to be his best man and Eileen Webster appears, the daughter of the General and his fiancée of four years; the transfer is plainly meant to commit them to marriage. While dining with the Websters at the Officers' Club, a Marine Corps officer enters with Fumiko, a Japanese beauty, and Lloyd joins the Websters in volubly declaring their scorn for any American friendly with the Japanese; the General subsequently issues an order banning Japanese guests from the Club, leading to a scene the next day when the same officer attempts to reenter with Fumiko. A few days later, Lloyd attends the Takarazuka Revue with the Websters, where he recognizes Fumiko as one of the performers. That night, Lloyd and Eileen go on a date where his impulsive marriage proposal is met with doubt, as his father, four-star General Harry Gruver, is notorious throughout the Army for his stable yet loveless marriage.

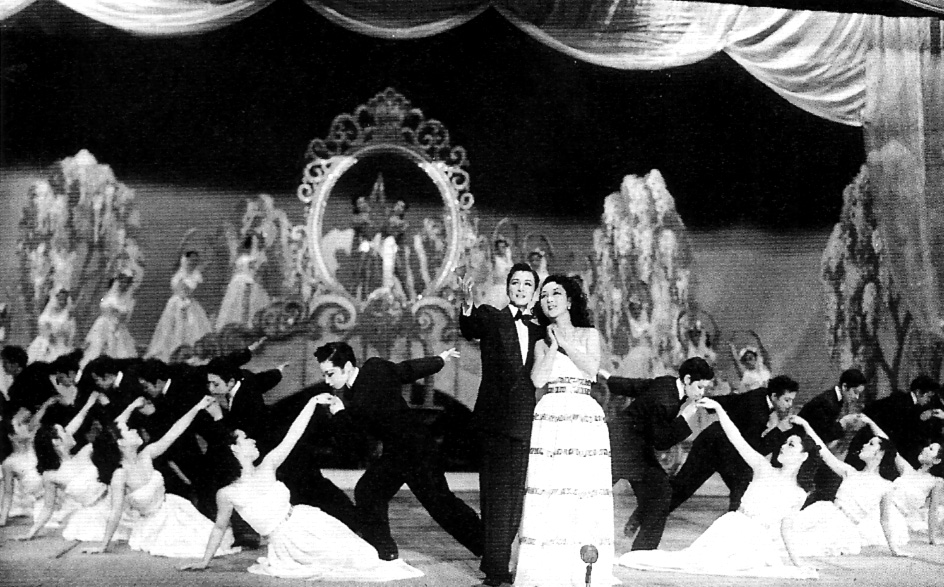
The Takarazuka Revue, shown here during a performance of "The elegy of a white flower" (March 1951), is well-known for its all-female cast, including traditionally male roles.

Lloyd's service as Joe's best man earns him angry lectures from Eileen's parents for encouraging the interracial marriage and he reiterates his general opposition, claiming this was an exception because he knows Joe personally. After another fight with Eileen during which he voices his fear she is becoming her overbearing mother, they part on cold terms. He reports to Itami Airfield for his next assignment, where he is befriended by Lieutenant Mike Bailey, the Marine pilot who is dating Fumiko, and together they go watch the Takarazuka performers returning to their dormitory. To provide a plausible cover story, Lloyd accompanies Mike to a meeting with Fumiko at a local restaurant, as the Keihanshin Kyūkō Railway, the operator of the Revue, has prohibited any relationships for its performers, including dalliances with American soldiers; nevertheless, they are caught by other Takarazuka members, cutting the evening short.

In the barracks that night, Mike explains his goals: "when I come to any country I want to do three things. Eat the food of that country, in this case sukiyaki which is horrible. Drink the liquor which is also horrible. And make love to the girls, which in the case of Fumiko-san would be delirious." Watching the Takarazuka procession again the next day, Lloyd is drawn to one of the women that caught them with Fumiko, Hana-ogi, who plays masculine roles.

Mrs. Nancy Webster, the General's wife, senses the frosty emotions between Lloyd and Eileen and asks if he has changed his mind about marriage and military service. After agreeing to call on Eileen for dinner tomorrow, Lloyd visits the blissful newlyweds Joe and Katsumi; Eileen coolly rejects his invitations, so he attends the Takarazuka staging of Madame Butterfly with the couple instead, where he is mesmerized by Hana-ogi's performance. Lloyd begs Katsumi to introduce him to her, but Hana-ogi holds a generally anti-American attitude, as her brother and father were killed by Americans during the war; they manage a short conversation, translated through Katsumi, leaving Lloyd obsessed. As his crush intensifies, one night he ambushes her during the procession, kissing her first on the hand and then the lips. Fumiko counsels him to stop, as Hana-ogi's family relies on her Takarazuka income, but Lloyd and Hana-ogi are enflamed by their mutual attraction, impulsively purchasing train tickets together to spend a day away from the scrutiny of their peers in a rural village, then making love despite not understanding each other's native tongue.

Lloyd confesses he loves Hana-ogi to Mike, who warns him that any public display of interracial affection will result in his arrest and asks if he is afraid of American women. Lloyd responds: "I did not think [Eileen] could take a wounded man and make him whole, for my mother in thirty years of married life had never once, so far as I knew, done for my father the simple healing act that Katsumi Kelly had done for her man the other night." The next day, Katsumi visits to tell Lloyd they have arranged a house for him and Hana-ogi, where they spend many happy nights together, delighting in the discovery of new language and finding common background.

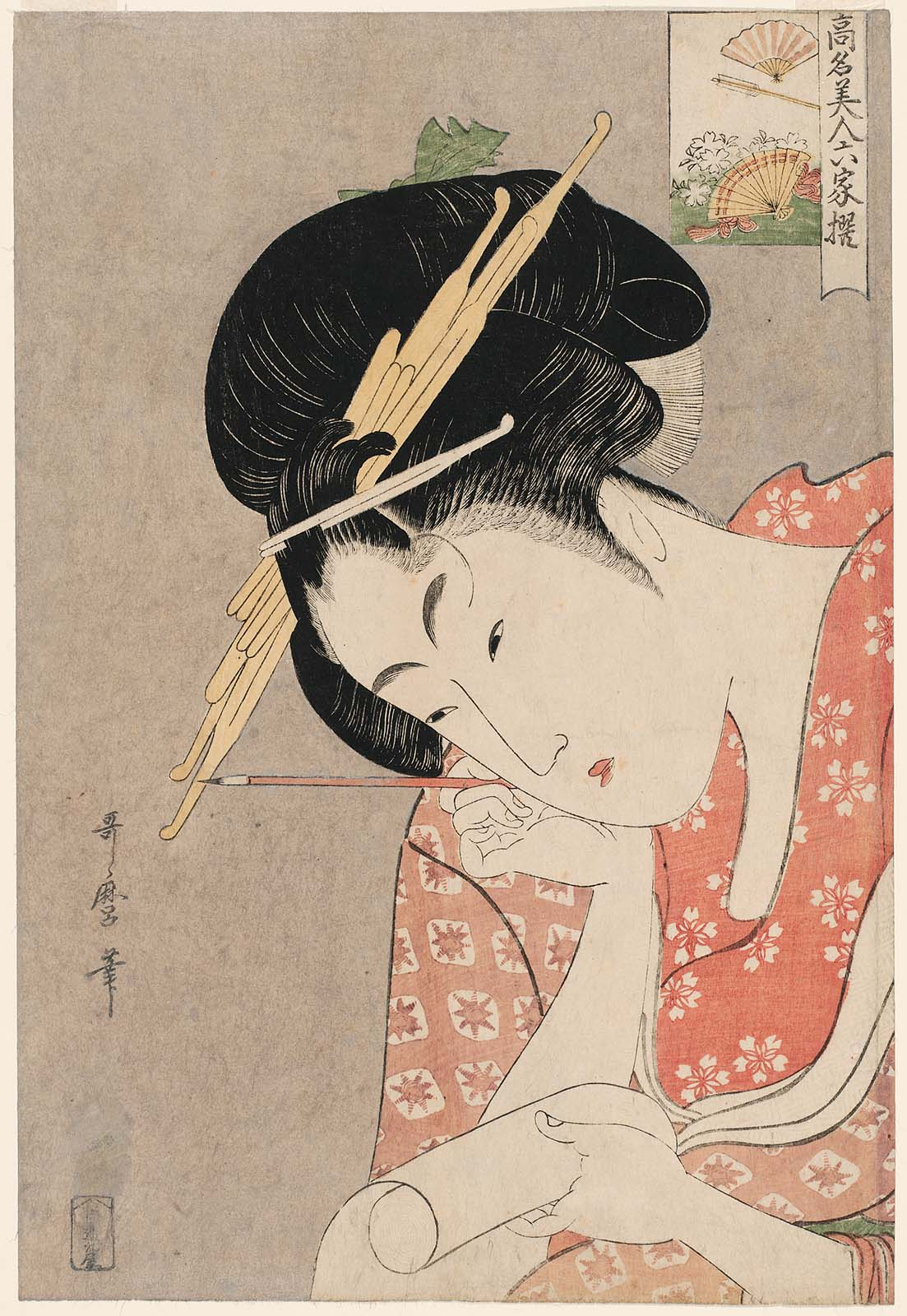
The oiran Hanaōgi of the Ōgiya brothel, a print by Utamaro from the Kōmei Bijin Rokkasen, c. 1795–1796; the name is written as a rebus in the upper right corner: fan-arrow flower-fan or Ōgi-ya Hana-ōgi.

Katsumi, denied access to the post exchange due to the prejudice of Lieutenant Colonel Calhoun Craford, asks Lloyd to purchase American-style panties for her; embarrassed by the errand, he realizes how profoundly unhappy the American wives are when they loudly judge his confusion and presumptive Japanese girlfriend. Hana-ogi tells him the story of her namesake, the oiran Hanaōgi of the Ōgiya brothel, a famed beauty who disappeared for years, rumored to have run off with a lover, then returned and worked until she was old and forgotten. Lloyd and Hana-ogi are caught one night holding hands at a movie; he is reported to General Webster, who sends for General Gruver and threatens to court-martial Lloyd for defying the anti-miscegenation orders.

During a frank discussion with his father, Lloyd explains why he dislikes Nancy and Harry advises him that marrying Hana-ogi would limit his career, defusing the situation by promising that Lloyd will marry Eileen; however, after Harry leaves, Lloyd and Hana-ogi resume their affair instead, now sharing the little house of Joe and Katsumi. Lloyd learns how lucky he is, immersed in a neighborhood of Japanese couples with varying happiness, and decides to start the paperwork to marry Hana-ogi; she rejects his proposal and instead takes him to a museum in Kyoto to view ukiyo-e prints of the oiran Hanaōgi. He is confused, calling the depictions in the prints from masters including Shunchō and Utamaro "ugly" and "disgusting"; Hana-ogi explains she wanted him to better understand her background and why she continues to reject his proposals.

The happy quartet is dismantled swiftly: Craford orders Joe back to the United States, which would leave the pregnant Katsumi alone, as their marriage remains illegal in the United States; General Webster and the Keihanshin Kyūkō Railway also issue orders to separate Lloyd and Hana-ogi, sending them to Randolph Field and Tokyo, respectively. The transfers are scheduled to take effect in five days. Lloyd dines with the Websters again at the Officer's Club, where Eileen briefly reconciles with Lloyd, protesting the separation of Joe from Katsumi to her parents and congratulating Lloyd on his newfound bravery for insisting he will marry Hana-ogi: "'Remember the time I asked you if you ever felt like just grabbing me and hauling me off to some shack?' We both smiled awkwardly at this and she said, 'That's just about what you did, wasn't it? But with somebody else.' She kissed me on the cheek and said good-naturedly, 'Well, I'm glad you turned out to be a man and not a mouse.'"

The night before their shared separations, the two couples attend a bunraku tragedy. When Joe misses his flight home, Lloyd accompanies the military police to the house, where they find the bodies of Joe and Katsumi, who have ended their lives; Lloyd warns Hana-ogi away from the scene with a pet phrase, which is the last time they see each other. The next day Lloyd meets with General Webster, who gives him a telegram saying that Congress is working on legislation to recognize Japanese wives and a brief farewell letter from Hana-ogi before offering him a ride to the air field, accompanied by Eileen.

== Publication ==
The novel was serialized in McCall's as "Sayonara Means Goodbye" in the October, November, and December 1953 issues prior to being published as a book in spring 1954. It originally was scheduled for publication by Random House in July 1953.

== Reception ==
In a 1954 review, Time compared the story to Madame Butterfly but found the execution of the moral message overbearing: "Michener is so busy swatting interracial injustice that he beats the life out of his story long before it is time to say sayonara". Kirkus Reviews also compared it to Butterfly and said it suited "a far more feminine [...] audience than The Bridges of Toko-Ri" [sic], adding the earlier novel by Michener "might be more practical in its understanding and tolerance." Reviewing for The New York Times, Vern Sneider noted "Sayonara is far from being Michener at his best", calling "his two main characters [little] more than shadows and his plot ... contrived and preachy." Jack Mason called it a "moving story" but added "the novel will be discussed mostly for its opinion of the American girl".

== Adaptations ==
Sayonara was made into a film of the same name, released in 1957; it was directed by Joshua Logan and featured Marlon Brando and Miiko Taka as Major Gruver and Hana-ogi, respectively. Miyoshi Umeki won an Academy Award in 1958 for her portrayal of Katsumi in that film, which changes the ending to have Gruver marry Hana-ogi at Brando's insistence.

In addition, the novel was adapted by William Luce into a musical of the same name, premiering at the Paper Mill Playhouse in 1987, with music by George Fischoff and lyrics by Hy Gilbert. It starred Richard White as Gruver and June Angela as Hana-ogi. Writing for The New York Times, Alvin Klein called it "purely and purposefully sumptuous ... a spectacle with a soul." The musical was revived and revised in 1993 by the 5th Avenue Musical Theatre Company (Seattle) and Theatre Under the Stars (Houston), featuring Sala Iwamatsu as Hana-ogi during its premiere run in Houston.
