= The Challenge (1982 film) =

- Film poster by C.W. Taylor
- Directed by: John Frankenheimer
- Written by: Richard Maxwell; John Sayles
- Produced by: Ron Beckman; Robert L. Rosen
- Starring: Scott Glenn; Toshirō Mifune; Donna Kei Benz
- Cinematography: Kôzô Okazaki
- Edited by: Jack Wheeler; John W. Wheeler
- Music by: Jerry Goldsmith
- Production company: CBS Theatrical Films
- Distributed by: Embassy Pictures
- Release date: July 23, 1982
- Running time: 109 minutes
- Country: United States
- Languages: English; Japanese
- Box office: $3.6 million

The Challenge is a 1982 American action film directed by John Frankenheimer from a screenplay by John Sayles and Richard Maxwell, and starring Scott Glenn and Toshirō Mifune. The plot follows a down-on-his-luck boxer (Glenn) who is hired to transport a valuable katana to Japan, where he becomes embroiled in a blood feud between two martial artist brothers. It was released by Embassy Pictures on July 23, 1982, and received mixed reviews.

== Plot ==
A katana, one of a pair known as "The Equals", was an heirloom of the Yoshida family, passed down through the generations before being lost during World War II. It was finally tracked down and recovered in California by siblings Toshio and Akiko. Hoping to return the katana to its rightful owner, their father Toru, Toshio hires down-on-his luck prize fighter Rick Murphy to smuggle the sword back to Japan.

Upon their arrival, Murphy and Toshio are captured by thugs working for Toru's estranged brother Hideo, a well-connected kuromaku (or "black curtain" in English, a fixer who works behind the scenes for Yakuza). Toshio is murdered and Murphy is faced with the prospect of being killed by Hideo. Murphy learns that the sword is a fake and himself a decoy, intended to ward off potential thieves.

Murphy escapes Hideo's thugs and awakens in Akiko's family home and after a brief stay departs with his money. Hideo's thugs, led by his interpreter and bodyguard Ando, find Murphy and give him two choices: infiltrate Yoshida's martial arts school and obtain the sword, or be beheaded. He takes the infiltration option, yet finds himself being drawn into the ways of Japanese etiquette and tradition to the point where he returns the sword to Toru after having the perfect opportunity to escape with it. Murphy then humbly asks Toru if he can be forgiven and taken back in because he wants to learn the ways of Bushido. Toru agrees, but only if Murphy follows Toru's conditions.

Murphy continues to bumble his way through life at Toru's school until, after a treacherous and almost fatal attempt by one of the higher members of the school to steal the sword, he leaves and is found in a hotel in Kyoto by Toru's surviving child, his daughter Akiko. Finding romance, they go out to see the sights and sounds of the city, including watching a Shinto ceremony. During the hub-bub of the crowded parade, Murphy and Akiko get separated and Hideo's henchmen kidnap her and deliver her to her uncle. Toru, laden with ancient weaponry, ventures out to Hideo's industrial complex where he is shot and wounded by Ando. Ando is slain by Hideo for this, and Murphy – who has joined him in his quest – opts to fight Hideo to defend his sensei. Murphy manages to kill Hideo and present "The Equals" to Toru.

== Cast ==
- Scott Glenn as Rick Murphy
- Toshiro Mifune as Satoru "Toru" Yoshida
- Donna Kei Benz as Akiko Yoshida
- Atsuo Nakamura as Hideo Yoshida
- Calvin Jung as Ando
- Clyde Kusatsu as Gō
- Kiyoaki Nagai as Kubo
- Kenta Fukasaku as Jiro
- Sab Shimono as Toshio Yoshida
  - Ryuji Yamashita as young Toshio
- Shōgo Shimada as Shin'ichi Yoshida
- Yoshio Inaba as Kenzo
- Seiji Miyaguchi as Old Man
- Miiko Taka as Machiko Yoshida
- Kazunaga Tsuji as Hashimoto
- Naoto Fujita as Tanaka
- Masao Hisanori as Oshima
- Sanae Nakahara as Bar Hostess

== Production ==
=== Writing ===
Richard Maxwell's original screenplay was set in Hong Kong and concerned Chinese characters.

John Sayles, who had worked on the horror films Piranha (1978), Alligator (1980) and The Howling (1981), was then brought in by director John Frankenheimer to rework the script in only five days to give to Scott Glenn. Sayles says this time limit was due to the fact the Writers Guild and Directors Guild were doing on strike. He also claims Frankenheimer wanted to cast Toshiro Mifune, with whom he had made Grand Prix, which meant the film changed from a Chinese story to Japanese one.

Sayles rewrote the script in several days, and Scott Glenn agreed to make the movie. The Writers Guild strike was pushed back enabling Sayles to be flown to Japan to work on the script. Sayles rewrote the script again in the Imperial Hotel in Tokyo while Frankenheimer cast the film. To help get into the mindset of the Japanese characters, Sayles read Zen and the Art of Archery, The Book of Five Rings and The Art of War.

=== Casting ===
Yoko Shimada, Toshiro Mifune's Japanese co-star in the 1980 historical drama miniseries Shōgun, was the first choice to play Akiko, but was rejected by director John Frankenheimer because he wanted an actress fluent in English. Donna Kei Benz, the Japanese American actress eventually cast, did not speak Japanese and took a four-month crash course in language, etiquette, and martial arts.

Japanese actor Atsuo Nakamura's English dialogue was dubbed by an uncredited Paul Frees. Frees had done the same for Mifune in Frankenheimer's 1966 sports drama film Grand Prix and Jack Smight's 1976 war film Midway.

This was the final film of Japanese American actress Miiko Taka, who also worked as Mifune's interpreter.

The sword fight sequences were choreographed by Ryû Kuze, a veteran Japanese kenjutsu master who had worked with Mifune on Akira Kurosawa's jidaigeki films Yojimbo (1961) and Sanjuro (1962).

Steven Seagal, credited as 'Steve Seagal', served as a martial arts coordinator.

=== Filming ===
The film was shot almost entirely on-location in Osaka and Kyoto, Japan. The Kyoto International Conference Center was used as the location of Hideo's headquarters. The scenes of Yoshida's compound were shot at the Shōkoku-ji Buddhist temple.

According to lead actor Scott Glenn, the script initially focused on the surrogate father-son relationship that developed between his character and Toshiro Mifune's. However, upon filming, Glenn realized that character-driven scenes were being shortened or removed in favor of genre elements. Glenn stated: "I remember Mifune came to me, and he said, "Look, this is what's happening. I'm disappointed, and I know you are, but this is what it is. So you can either have your heart broken every day, or you can use this experience as an opportunity to be spending time in the most interesting time in Japan and let me be your tour guide." Glenn said that the time he spent in Japan with his family and Mifune made up for his disappointment over the script changes.

== Alternate version ==
A re-edited version of the film entitled Sword of the Ninja was created for television. In this version, about ten minutes of footage are cut, some of the graphic violence of the original version is removed, and "fades" are added to make room for commercial breaks.

== Reception ==
Critic Dennis Schwartz gave the film a C+ grade, calling it a "pointless", "low-level Chuck Norris flick". He enjoyed Frankenheimer's directing and Mifune's performance, questioning why they chose to make such a film. Time Out wrote that the "elaborate combat will please fans", but that The Yakuza was a much better film in the genre. Janet Maslin for The New York Times was unimpressed with the film's "regrettably vicious streak" and wrote that the film had unused potential. However, she praised Toshirō Mifune's performance as adding weight to the film. Adam Lippe, writing for Examiner.com, had a better opinion of the film, calling it "grimy, off-putting, and just right for the moment". On a "Dogs of the Week" segment for the television show Sneak Previews, Gene Siskel stated that he went to see the film in expectation that it would be bad, but found it to be OK in terms of in quality, with memorable characters and strong themes of honor and tradition.

On Rotten Tomatoes, The Challenge holds a rating of 53% from 17 reviews.

== Notes ==
- Sayles, John (1998). Smith, Gavin (ed.). Sayles on Sayles. Faber & Faber/Farrar, Straus and Giroux. ISBN 0-571-19280-7.
