= Miiko Taka =

American actress (1925–2023)

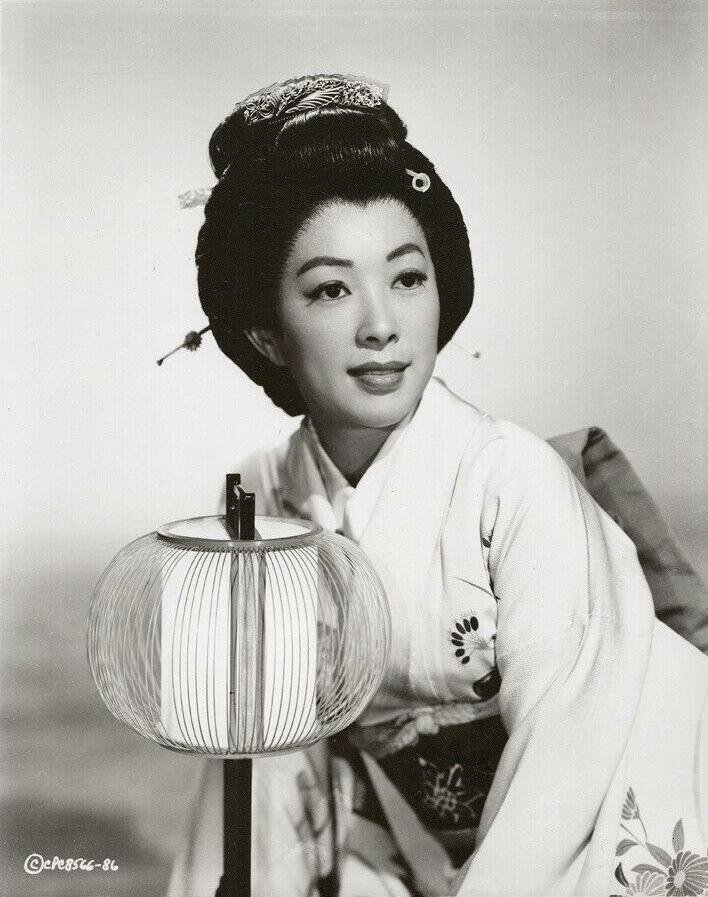
- Taka in a publicity photo for Cry for Happy (1961)
- Born: Miiko Shikata; July 24, 1925; Seattle, Washington, U.S.
- Died: January 4, 2023 (aged 97); Las Vegas, Nevada, U.S.
- Resting place: Rose Hills Memorial Park
- Other name: Betty Ishimoto
- Years active: 1957–1982
- Spouses: Dale Ishimoto (m. 1944; div. 1958) Lennie Blondheim (m. 1963; died 2002) Reginald Hsu (m. 2003)
- Children: 2

Signature (Japanese)
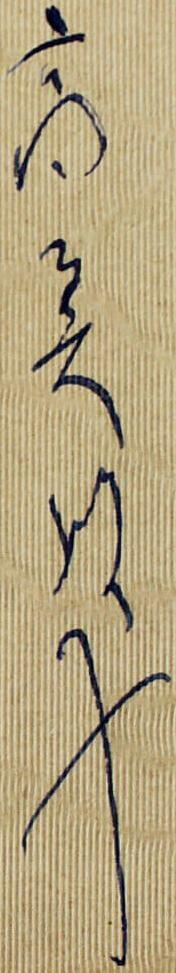

Signature
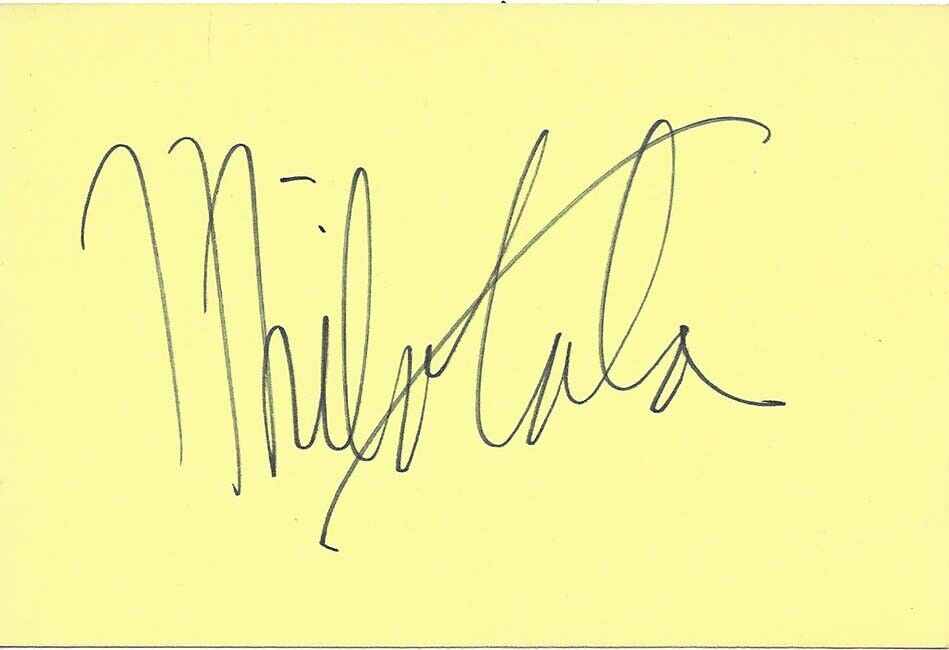

Miiko Shikata (Japanese: 志方以子, Hepburn: Shitaka Miiko) (July 24, 1925 – January 4, 2023), known professionally as Miiko Taka (高美以子, Taka Miiko), was an American actress. She was known for her film and television roles from the late 1950s until the early 1980s. Her best known role was as an elegant Japanese dancer starring with Marlon Brando in the romantic drama Sayonara (1957).

== Early years ==
Taka was born on July 24, 1925 in Seattle, but raised in Los Angeles as a Nisei; her parents had immigrated from Japan. In 1942, following the signing of Executive Order 9066, she was interned with her family at the Gila River War Relocation Center in Arizona.

== Career ==
After Audrey Hepburn, director Joshua Logan's first choice for the role of Hana-ogi, turned him down, he looked to cast an unknown actress. Taka, who at the time was working as a clerk at a travel agency in Los Angeles, was discovered by a talent scout at a local Nisei festival and brought to Warner Bros. for a screen test, and subsequently offered the part. Although she had had no previous acting experience, Variety gave her a positive review for the role, and Warner Bros. gave her a term contract after completing Sayonara.

After Sayonara, she worked in films with James Garner, Bob Hope, Cary Grant, Glenn Ford, Miyoshi Umeki and Toshirō Mifune (alongside whom she also worked in the 1980 television miniseries Shõgun). She also served as an interpreter for Mifune and Akira Kurosawa when they visited Hollywood.

== Personal life ==
Taka married Japanese-American actor Dale Ishimoto in Baltimore, Maryland in 1944, and they had one son, Greg Shikata, who works in the film industry, and one daughter. They divorced in 1958.

Taka married Los Angeles television news director Lennie Blondheim in 1963. She resided in Las Vegas, Nevada. Following Blondheim's death in 2002, she married Reginald Hsu in 2003.

=== Death ===
Taka died on January 4, 2023, at the age of 97. She is interred at Rose Hills Memorial Park.

== Filmography ==
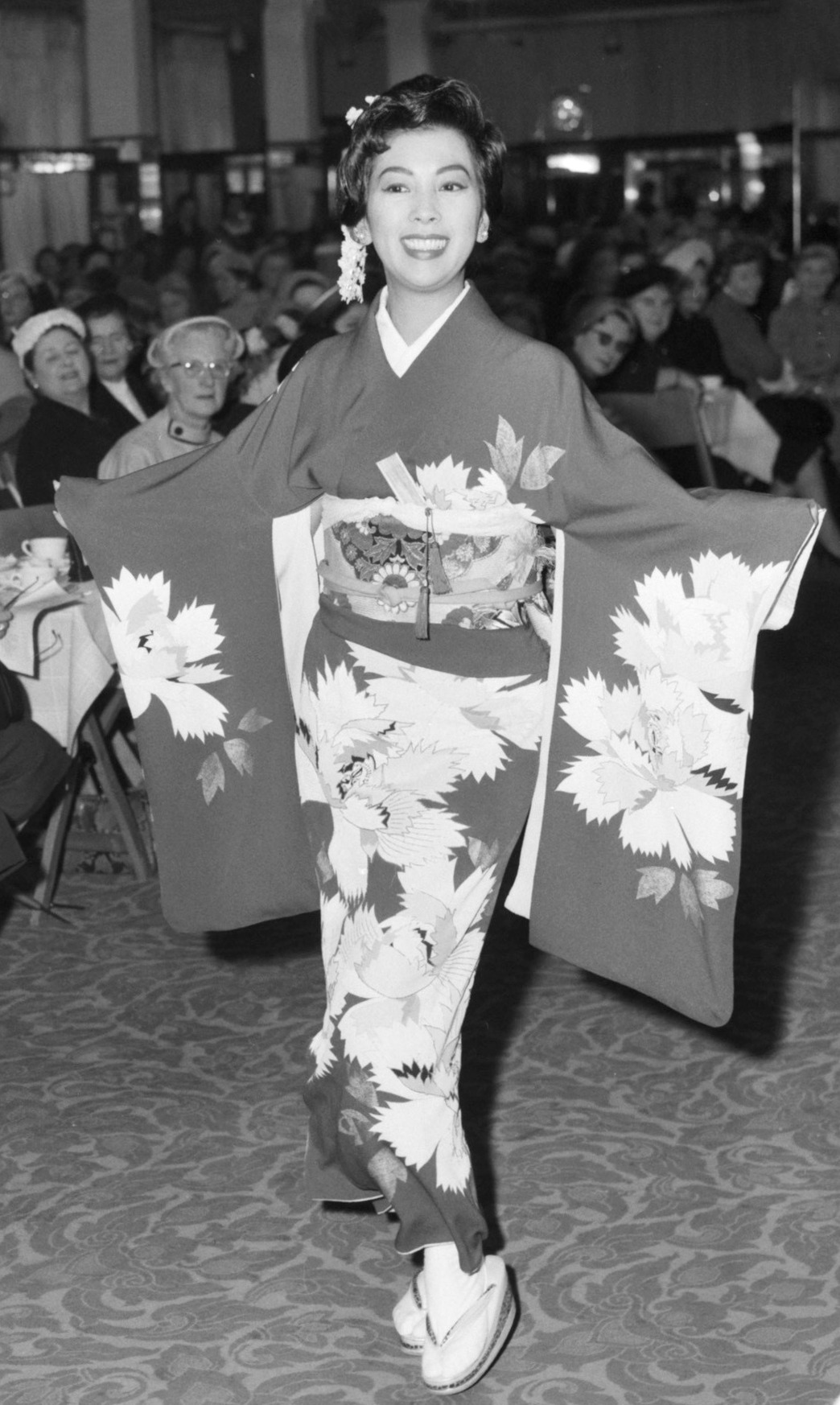
Taka in 1958.

=== Film ===
Year	Title	Role	Notes
1957	Sayonara	Hana-ogi	
1958	Panda and the Magic Serpent	Fish Spirit (voice)	English dub
1960	Hell to Eternity	Ester	
1961	Cry for Happy	Chiyoko	
1961	Operation Bottleneck	Ari	
1963	A Global Affair	Fumiko	
1965	The Art of Love	Chou Chou	
1966	Walk, Don't Run	Aiko Kurawa	
1968	The Power	Mrs. Van Zandt	
1973	Lost Horizon	Nurse	
1975	Paper Tiger	Madame Kagoyama	
1976	Midway		TV version only, uncredited
1978	The Big Fix	Saleswoman	
1982	The Challenge	Yoshida's wife	

=== Television ===
Year	Title	Role	Notes
1959	Hawaiian Eye	Sumiko	Episode: "Second Day of Infamy"
1959	Alcoa Theatre	Nika Shioya	Episode: "Small Bouquet"
1961	Adventures in Paradise	Renge Yoshikawa	Episode: "The Wonderful Nightingale"
1965	The Man from U.N.C.L.E.	Jade	Episode: "The Hong Kong Shilling Affair"
1965	The F.B.I.	Akiko Maddock	Episode: "The Problem of the Honorable Wife"
1965	I Spy	Yoshino Tasuko	Episode: "Tigers of Heaven"
1967	The Girl from U.N.C.L.E.	Madame Dao	Episode: "The Fountain of Youth Affair"
1967	The Wild Wild West	Haruko Ishida	Episode: "The Night of the Deadly Blossom"
1972	Anna and the King	Poor Peasant	Episode: "The Baby"
1974	The Brian Keith Show	Mrs. Browning	Episode: "Sean, the Dad"
1974	Judge Dee and the Monastery Murders	Jade Mirror	TV movie
1975	The Lives of Jenny Dolan	Secretary	TV movie
1976	The Moneychangers	Mom	Miniseries
1977	Billy: Portrait of a Street Kid	Receptionist	TV movie
1978	A Family Upside Down	Mrs. Taka	TV movie
1980	Shōgun	Kiri	Miniseries

== See also ==
- History of the Japanese in Los Angeles
