= Sayonara (1957 film) =

1957 film by Joshua Logan

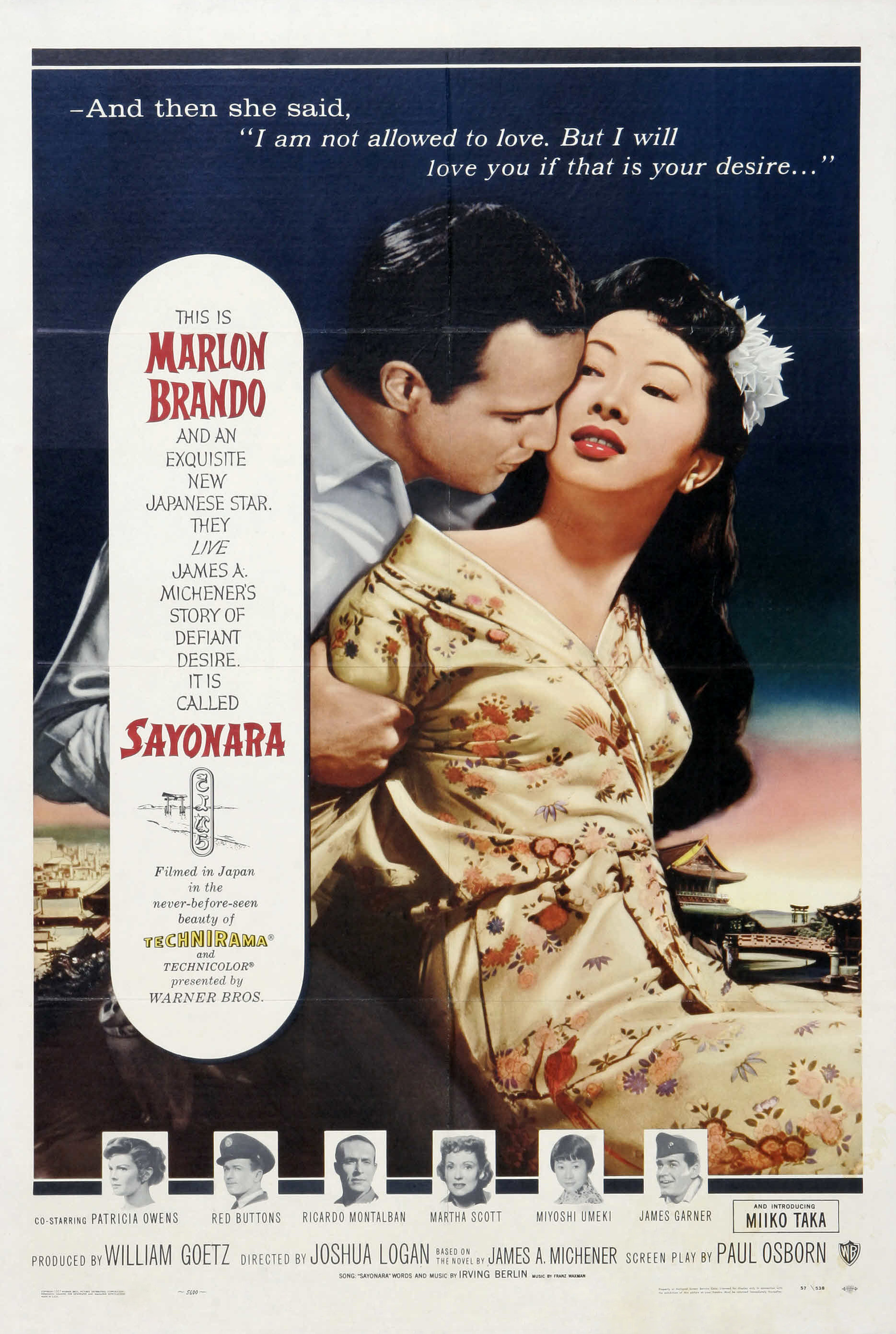
- Theatrical release poster
- Directed by: Joshua Logan
- Screenplay by: Paul Osborn
- Based on: Sayonara (1954 novel) by James Michener
- Produced by: William Goetz
- Starring: Marlon Brando; Patricia Owens; Red Buttons; Ricardo Montalbán; Martha Scott; Miyoshi Umeki; James Garner; Miiko Taka
- Cinematography: Ellsworth Fredricks
- Edited by: Arthur P. Schmidt; Philip W. Anderson
- Music by: Franz Waxman
- Production companies: Pennebaker Productions; William Goetz Productions
- Distributed by: Warner Bros. Pictures
- Release dates: December 5, 1957 (New York, premiere); December 25, 1957 (U.S.)
- Running time: 147 minutes
- Country: United States
- Languages: English; Japanese
- Budget: $3.2 million
- Box office: $26.3 million

Sayonara is a 1957 American romantic drama film directed by Joshua Logan, adapted by Paul Osborn from James A. Michener's 1954 novel. It stars Marlon Brando, Patricia Owens, James Garner, Martha Scott, Miyoshi Umeki, Red Buttons, Miiko Taka and Ricardo Montalbán. It tells the story of an American Air Force pilot during the Korean War who falls in love with a famous Japanese dancer. "Sayonara" is the Japanese word for goodbye.

Unlike many 1950s romantic dramas, Sayonara deals squarely with racism and prejudice. The film was released by Warner Bros. Pictures on December 25, 1957, to critical acclaim and commercial success. At the 30th Academy Awards the film was nominated in ten categories and won four, including Best Supporting Actor for Buttons and Best Supporting Actress for Umeki. The latter award made Umeki the first East Asia-born woman to win an Oscar.

== Plot ==
United States Air Force fighter pilot Major Lloyd "Ace" Gruver, the son of an Army general, is stationed at Itami Air Force Base near Kobe, Japan. He has been reassigned from combat duties in Korea by General Webster, the father of his fiancée, Eileen. While Ace and Eileen have been together for years, their relationship has become strained.

Airman Joe Kelly, Ace's enlisted crew chief, is about to wed a Japanese woman, Katsumi, in spite of the disapproval of the military establishment, which will not recognize the interracial marriage because it is generally illegal under American law. The Air Force, including Ace, is against the marriage. Ace and Joe have an argument during which Ace uses a racial slur to describe Katsumi. Ace eventually apologizes, then agrees to be Joe's best man at the wedding.

Ace falls in love with a Japanese entertainer, Hana-ogi, who is the lead performer for the all-female "Matsubayashi", a Takarazuka-like theater company, whom he meets through Katsumi. Eileen realizes that Ace's attentions are no longer focused on her and begins a friendship with a famous Kabuki performer, Nakamura. After overhearing that Joe's house has been under surveillance by the Army, she believes that Ace is in danger and goes there to warn him.

Joe suffers further prejudice at the hands of openly hostile Colonel Crawford, pulling extra duty and all the less attractive assignments. When Joe and others who are married to Japanese are targeted for transfer back to the United States, Joe realizes that he will not be able to take Katsumi, who is now pregnant. Ace goes to General Webster and pleads Joe's case, asking that he be allowed to remain in Japan. When the General refuses on the grounds that he cannot allow an exception, Ace says that he will be in the same situation, since he intends to marry Hana-ogi. Eileen and her mother are present for the exchange, and Ace apologizes for hurting her. Eileen realizes Ace never loved her the way he loves Hana-ogi and leaves to see Nakamura.

Joe and Katsumi's home is raided up by the military police and Ace is taken into custody by General Webster, where he is confined to quarters. He is told that he will most likely be sent back to the United States and Hana-ogi will be sent to Tokyo. Joe goes AWOL, and two Military Police seek Ace's help to find Joe through his local connections so he can be sent back to the U.S. and not be reported missing, which could lead to charges ranging from deliberately missing a movement — a serious offense in wartime — all the way to desertion. Ace, accompanied by Captain Bailey, finds Joe and Katsumi who had secretly returned to their home and committed double suicide rather than be parted. Hana-ogi later arrives unnoticed and alone outside Joe and Katsumi's home. There, she opens a window and, still unseen, whispers a tearful "sayonara" to Joe, Katsumi, and Ace, although nobody hears her. Hana-ogi then leaves through the rear gate.

After exiting Joe's home, Ace and Bailey are attacked by Japanese holding anti-American signs. However, sympathetic Japanese neighbors intervene to help the Americans, resulting in widespread fighting in the street. Ace and Bailey escape during the scuffles.

The loss of Joe and Katsumi strengthens Ace's resolve to marry Hana-ogi, and Ace goes to the theater company to find her. There, he learns Hana-ogi has already left Kobe for Tokyo a week ahead of schedule. General Webster, believing the crisis with Ace is averted, apologizes for what happened to Joe and Katsumi and says that laws will soon be passed to allow interracial marriages in the United States.

Ace leaves Kobe and flies to Tokyo. He tracks down Hana-ogi at her new venue in a Tokyo theater and pleads with her again to become his wife. They leave the theater and Hana-ogi announces to the waiting Japanese and American reporters that they intend to wed. When a military newspaper reporter asks Ace how he will explain his marriage to the "big brass" as well as to the Japanese, Ace says, "Tell 'em we said, 'Sayonara.'"

== Cast ==
- Marlon Brando as Major Lloyd "Ace" Gruver, USAF
- Patricia Owens as Eileen Webster
- James Garner as Captain Mike Bailey, USMC
- Martha Scott as Mrs. Webster
- Miiko Taka as Hana-ogi
- Miyoshi Umeki as Katsumi Kelly
- Red Buttons as Airman Joe Kelly
- Ricardo Montalbán as Nakamura
- Kent Smith as Lieutenant General Mark Webster
- Reiko Kuba as Fumiko
- Soo Yong as Teruko
- Douglass Watson as Colonel Crawford
- Harlan Warde as American Consul
- William Wellman Jr. as Stars and Stripes reporter

== Production ==
=== Casting ===
According to director Joshua Logan, Marlon Brando was the first choice. He turned it down so they offered the part to Rock Hudson who had too many obligations at Universal. They tried Brando again who was reluctant, so they offered the female lead to Audrey Hepburn. Brando eventually agreed to do it if they changed the ending of the novel so the two lovers got married instead of the American leaving. When Hepburn turned Logan down, he looked to cast an unknown actress. Miiko Taka, who at the time was working as a clerk at a travel agency in Los Angeles, was discovered by a talent scout at a local Nisei festival. She was cast despite having no previous acting experience. Logan cast Ricardo Montalbán after claiming he was unable to find a Japanese actor for the role.

Brando affected a nondescript Southern accent for Gruver, despite the objections of director Logan, who did not think a Southern accent was appropriate for a general's son who was educated at West Point. Logan later admitted to the author and journalist Truman Capote about Brando, "I've never worked with such an exciting, inventive actor. So pliable. He takes direction beautifully, and yet he always has something to add. He's made up this Southern accent for the part; I never would have thought of it myself, but, well, it's exactly right – it's perfection." Ricardo Montalbán, born in Mexico to Spanish immigrants, plays a Japanese character in “yellowface” makeup. Montalbán modeled his performance on Seki Sano, a well-known Japanese acting teacher under whom he had trained.

Garner wrote in his memoirs that he actively lobbied to play his role, one of the few times in his career he did this. It had originally been cast with John Smith, but Garner succeeded in getting the part.

=== Filming ===
Principal photography began on January 7, 1957. Filming took place on-location in Japan: in Kobe, Kyoto, Osaka, Tokyo, Takamatsu, and at Itami Air Base. Production then moved to Los Angeles for studio interiors at Warner Bros. Studios Burbank. A scene at an officer's club was filmed at Yamashiro Historic District. A sequence was filmed at Hollywood Burbank Airport.

=== Music ===
The title song "Sayonara" was written by Irving Berlin and performed by Miiko Taka.

== Reception ==
=== Box office ===
It was number one at the US box office for five consecutive weeks in 1958. It earned $10.5 million in theatrical rentals in the United States and Canada and $5 million overseas. Kinematograph Weekly said the film "fell heavily short of expectations" at the British box office.

=== Critical response ===
Sayonara received widespread critical acclaim, particularly for its writing and cinematography, in addition to the acting ability of its cast. It won four Academy Awards, including acting honors for co-stars Red Buttons and Miyoshi Umeki. Review aggregator Rotten Tomatoes reports that 82% of critics out of 57 have given the film a positive review, with a rating average of 7.6/10, with the website's critics consensus reading, "As sumptuously staged as it is ponderously paced, Sayonara flutters by on the strength of its touching story and solidly assembled cast.".

=== Later analysis ===
In an article for the Los Angeles Times in 2003, Scarlet Cheng stated that the film "while calling for tolerance, also views the Japanese woman (so quiet, so subservient) as clearly superior to her American counterpart (so demanding, so loud). The Brando character, Maj. Lloyd, on R & R in Japan, doesn’t start out with this appreciation. As the movie opens, he’s trying to persuade another soldier to give up his Japanese girlfriend -- by showing him a picture of his own fiancee...Soon afterward, though, the good major breaks off his long-standing engagement -- to take up with a Japanese stage actress...Of course, the object of his affection is no mere chorine, but in fact, the star of the show, adored by thousands of fans -- a fitting partner for an America hero."

=== Accolades ===
Award	Category	Nominee(s)	Result
Academy Awards	Best Picture	William Goetz	Nominated
Academy Awards	Best Director	Joshua Logan	Nominated
Academy Awards	Best Actor	Marlon Brando	Nominated
Academy Awards	Best Supporting Actor	Red Buttons	Won
Academy Awards	Best Supporting Actress	Miyoshi Umeki	Won
Academy Awards	Best Adapted Screenplay	Paul Osborn	Nominated
Academy Awards	Best Art Direction	Ted Haworth, Robert Priestley	Won
Academy Awards	Best Cinematography	Ellsworth Fredricks	Nominated
Academy Awards	Best Film Editing	Arthur P. Schmidt, Philip W. Anderson	Nominated
Academy Awards	Best Sound	George Groves	Won
British Academy Film Awards	Most Promising Newcomer to Film	Red Buttons	Nominated
David di Donatello Awards	Best Foreign Actor	Marlon Brando	Won (Note: Tied with Charles Laughton for Witness for the Prosecution.)
Directors Guild of America Awards	Outstanding Directorial Achievement in Motion Pictures	Joshua Logan	Nominated
Golden Globe Awards	Best Motion Picture – Drama		Nominated
Golden Globe Awards	Best Actor in a Motion Picture – Drama	Marlon Brando	Nominated
Golden Globe Awards	Best Supporting Actor – Motion Picture	Red Buttons	Won
Golden Globe Awards	Best Supporting Actress – Motion Picture	Miyoshi Umeki	Nominated
Golden Globe Awards	Best Director – Motion Picture	Joshua Logan	Nominated
Golden Globe Awards	Most Promising Newcomer – Male	James Garner	Won
Laurel Awards	Top Drama		Nominated
Laurel Awards	Top Male Supporting Performance	Red Buttons	Won
Laurel Awards	Top Male Supporting Performance	Ricardo Montalbán	Nominated
Laurel Awards	Top Music Composer	Franz Waxman	Nominated
New York Film Critics Circle Awards	Best Film		Nominated
New York Film Critics Circle Awards	Best Actor	Marlon Brando	Nominated
Writers Guild of America Awards	Best Written American Drama	Paul Osborn	Nominated

==== Best-of lists ====
The film is also recognized by American Film Institute in these lists:

- 2002: AFI's 100 Years...100 Passions – Nominated
- 2005: AFI's 100 Years of Film Scores – Nominated

== Legacy ==
Alongside the less successful Japanese War Bride (1952) and The Teahouse of the August Moon (1956), Sayonara is considered by some scholars to have increased racial tolerance in the United States by openly discussing interracial marriage. Other scholars have argued that it is one in a long list of films stereotyping Asian American women as "lotus blossom, geisha girl, china doll, or Suzie Wong".

== See also ==
- List of American films of 1957

== Bibliography ==
- Provencher, Ken (Spring 2014). "Bizarre Beauty: 1950s Runaway Production in Japan". The Velvet Light Trap. 73 (73). Austin, Texas: University of Texas Press: 39–50. doi:10.7560/VLT7304. ISSN 1542-4251. S2CID 142842143.
- Schallert, Edwin (December 26, 1957). "'Sayonara' Exerts Spell for Viewers". Los Angeles Times. Los Angeles. p. Part II p. 14. - Clipping at Newspapers.com.
