= Wild Is the Wind (1957 film) =

1957 film directed by George Cukor

Wild is the Wind
- Directed by: George Cukor
- Written by: Arnold Schulman; Vittorio Nino Novarese
- Based on: La Lupa; 1880 short story by Giovanni Verga
- Produced by: Hal B. Wallis
- Starring: Anna Magnani; Anthony Quinn
- Cinematography: Charles Lang
- Edited by: Warren Low
- Music by: Dimitri Tiomkin
- Distributed by: Paramount Pictures
- Release date: December 11, 1957
- Running time: 114 minutes
- Country: United States
- Language: English
- Box office: $1.5 million

Wild is the Wind is a 1957 American drama film directed by George Cukor and starring Anna Magnani, Anthony Quinn, and Anthony Franciosa. It tells the story of an American rancher who, after his wife dies, goes to Italy to marry her sister, but finds that she falls in love with his young ranch hand.

The screenplay was adapted by Arnold Schulman from the 1947 Italian film Fury, which was in turn loosely based on Giovanni Verga's novella La Lupa. The title song, "Wild Is the Wind", was performed by Johnny Mathis. The Italian title was 'Selvaggio è il vento', literal translation of the original English.

== Plot ==
Gino (Anthony Quinn) is a sheepherder in Nevada who travels to Italy to marry Gioia (Anna Magnani), the sister of his wife, who died a number of years previously.

He brings her back to his ranch, but struggles with the memory of his dead wife, even calling Gioia by his last wife's name. With Gino feeling disappointed with her, Gioia feels neglected and resentful that she is constantly being compared with her late sister and found wanting.

She turns outside of her marriage to fulfill her needs and has an affair with Bene (Anthony Franciosa), a ranch hand whom Gino raised from boyhood and considers as almost a son.

Only then does Gino realize how much he needs Gioia; he pleads with her to stay at the ranch instead of returning to Italy.

== Cast ==
- Anna Magnani as Gioia
- Anthony Quinn as Gino
- Anthony Franciosa as Bene
- Joseph Calleia as Alberto
- Dolores Hart as Angela/Angie
- Lili Valenty as Teresa
- James Flavin as Wool Buyer
- Dick Ryan as Priest
- Iphigenie Castiglioni as Party Guest
- Joseph Vitale as Party Guest
- Ruth Lee as Party Guest
- Frances Morris as Party Guest

== Production ==
=== Development ===
Anna Magnani had made a successful film for Hal Wallis, The Rose Tattoo (1955). He wanted to make a follow up and she said she would only do a remake of the Italian film, Furia (1947). According to Arnold Schulman this was because Magnani "was in love with Rossellini at one time and wanted to be in this particular movie which he was planning to do. When he pushed her aside and fell in love with somebody else — not Ingrid Bergman — she vowed that some day she'd make the movie without him as a kind of vengeance."

Wallis obtained the rights to Furia and the contract specified the original writer of that movie would get credit on any remake. Wallis arranged for various writers to take a pass at the material. Philip Yordan wrote a screenplay and Dalton Trumbo rewrote this script. These scripts were not used in the final film.

Arnold Schulman felt the original was "a dumb story, basically the same story the musical The Most Happy Fella is taken from: the mail-order wife." He pitched an idea for a take on the movie which appealed to Wallis who signed him to turn it into a screenplay, then called Obsession. It would be Schulman's first produced feature screenplay.

Schulman originally worked on the script with director John Sturges. As writing progressed, there were concerns about Sturges' suitabilty for the project and he left, replaced by George Cukor. Schulman said "Sturges considered himself an action director, and at the point that it was clear the project was turning into a love story with real people, he either quit or moved on. Cukor was obviously the choice to direct Magnani, the great actress of the day."

Schulman said the experience of developing the script with Wallis and Cukor was very enjoyable. He considered the screenplay a complete original nothing like the Italian film. However Paramount insisted that the original Italian author be credited on the final to protect the studio legally.

Dolores Hart was under contract to Wallis; it was her second film.

=== Shooting ===
Filming took place over sixteen weeks. Magnani was reportedly difficult during the shoot, complaining about the script and her wardrobe and clashing with Quinn. She also had an affair with Franciosa despite him also marrying Shelley Winters during the shoot.

"She was a pain in the ass," said Schulman. "She held up the filming. She asked for a Jeep to be sent to her home in Italy, or she wasn't going to work the next day. She got in bed and played sick." Schulman added that Quinn, Magnani and Fanciosa always wanted more close ups. "It was awful," he said. "I remember it very well: the weather, bad food, the motel... But Cukor had infinite patience. Though in most ways he didn't impose his personality on the film, what he did bring to it was his sensitivity about people and the human condition."

The cost of this film and Walllis' The Sad Sack together was a reported $4 million.

== Release ==
The film was the official American entry at the 8th Berlin International Film Festival.

Variety praised "Top grade perfermances, some unusual film sequences and expert production."

Schulman later said "There were sections of the film that became really stupid in order to conform to Magnani's revenge: getting even with Rossellini". However he liked moments of the movie and "the fact that this was the first picture that I can recall where the woman committed adultery and wasn't killed or punished at the end. In this one, the husband begged her for forgiveness, which was a revolutionary way of looking at things. That I liked. That was the honest way to do it. I felt the other way was a cliche, and Cukor agreed with me."

== Awards and nominations ==
Award	Category	Nominee(s)	Result
Academy Awards	Best Actor	Anthony Quinn	Nominated
Academy Awards	Best Actress	Anna Magnani	Nominated
Academy Awards	Best Song	"Wild Is the Wind"; Music by Dimitri Tiomkin; Lyrics by Ned Washington	Nominated
Berlin International Film Festival	Golden Bear	George Cukor	Nominated
Berlin International Film Festival	Best Actress	Anna Magnani	Won
British Academy Film Awards	Best Foreign Actress	Anna Magnani	Nominated
David di Donatello Awards	Best Actress	Anna Magnani	Won
Golden Globe Awards	Best Motion Picture – Drama		Nominated
Golden Globe Awards	Best Actress in a Motion Picture – Drama	Anna Magnani	Nominated
Laurel Awards	Top Male Dramatic Performance	Anthony Quinn	4th Place

== See also ==
- List of American films of 1957
- The Misfits (1961 film), for a comparison of exactly the same theme and scene of lassoing wild Reno horses from a truck, three years later.

== Notes ==
- McGilligan, Patrick (1997). "Arnold Schulman: Nothing but Regrets". Backstory 3 : interviews with screenwriters of the 1960s. Berkeley: University of California Press. pp. 298–327.
