= Cry for Happy =

1961 film by George Marshall

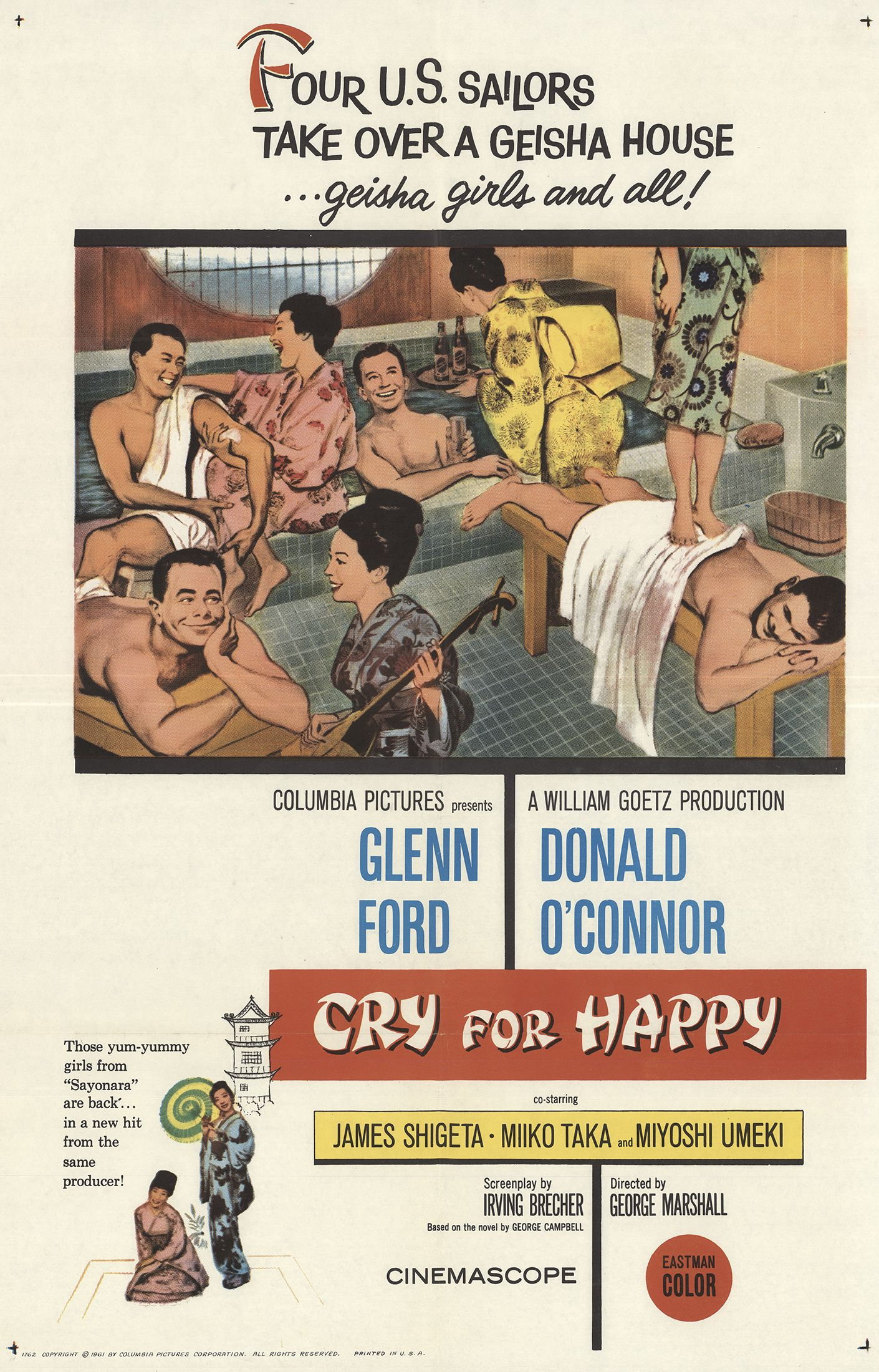
- 1961 Theatrical Poster
- Directed by: George Marshall
- Screenplay by: Irving Brecher
- Based on: Cry for Happy; 1958 novel by George Campbell
- Produced by: William Goetz
- Starring: Glenn Ford; Donald O'Connor
- Cinematography: Burnett Guffey
- Edited by: Chester W. Schaeffer
- Music by: George Duning
- Production company: William Goetz Productions
- Distributed by: Columbia Pictures
- Release date: January 1961
- Running time: 110 minutes
- Country: United States
- Language: English
- Box office: $1.8 million

Cry for Happy is a 1961 American CinemaScope comedy film directed by George Marshall and starring Glenn Ford and Donald O'Connor. It is a service comedy set in Japan and largely filmed there. The title song is sung during the opening credits by Miyoshi Umeki, who has a major role in the movie.

== Plot ==
During the Korean War, Andy Cyphers, a Navy photographer and his three-man team occupy a Tokyo geisha house, though it is off-limits and four girls are living there.

At first, the men misunderstand the geishas' occupation. Later, romance develops. Complications ensue when a tongue-in-cheek remark made to the press by Cyphers saying he was fighting in the Korean War to help Japanese orphans gets publicity in the United States, and the Navy starts to look into the situation. The sailors and the geishas decide to quickly convert the geisha house into a temporary orphanage with local children agreeing to pose as orphans in exchange for ice cream. Surprisingly, the ruse is successful and thousands of Americans donate money, leading to Cyphers establishing a legitimate orphanage. A double wedding is held between two of the sailors and two of the geishas, while the other two men consider following suit.

== Cast ==
- Glenn Ford as CPO Andy Cyphers
- Donald O'Connor as Murray Prince
- Miiko Taka as Chiyoko
- James Shigeta as Suzuki
- Miyoshi Umeki as Harue
- Michi Kobi as Hanakichi
- Howard St. John as Vice Adm. Admiral B. Bennett
- Joe Flynn as MacIntosh
- Chet Douglas as Lank
- Tsuruko Kobayashi as Koyuki
- Harriet E. MacGibbon as Mrs. Bennett
- Robert Kino as Mr. Endo
- Bob Okazaki as Izumi
- Harlan Warde as Chaplain
- Nancy Kovack as Camile Cameron
- Ted Knight as Lt. Glick
- Bill Quinn as Alan Lyman
- Ciyo Nakasone as Keiko

== Reception ==
Bosley Crowther of The New York Times wrote that "a great deal of nonsense" took place in the film—"nonsense of the sort that betokens a desperate scriptwriter at work ... Don't be surprised, indeed, at anything that happens in this knockabout film, derived from a novel by George Campbell, which must have been better, at least. And don't be disappointed, since you have been solemnly warned."

Variety called the film a "disappointment," with humor that was "uneven and largely low, exaggerated or obvious, and the stars have little to sink their thespic teeth into."

Harrison's Reports rated the film, "Good," with "some of the raciest lines we've heard yet in the new 'adult' wave of American films. This approach to burlesque comedy is going to bring new cries from censors and those demanding that pictures here be classified."

Roger Angell of The New Yorker called the film an "irritating work, which made me want to cry, all right, but not for happy."

Charles Stinson of the Los Angeles Times called the film "a moderately amusing effort — even if you've seen all its gags three dozen times before, which you certainly have." Stinson added that the one thing which distinguished Cry for Happy from the many other service comedies was Irving Brecher's dialogue, which was "professionally trim and bright but he could not resist lacing it with some of the stiffest shots of double-entendre heard on screen in a long time. Half a dozen lines are more than risque and at least one is far too raw even for a service comedy. This is enough to mark this film off the family list."

The Monthly Film Bulletin wrote, "Any film which expends most of its energies on a protracted joke about how far you can go with a geisha could hardly fail to be as charmless and witless as this."

== See also ==
- List of American films of 1961
