= Ted Haworth =

American production designer (1917–1993)

- Born: September 26, 1917; Cleveland, Ohio, US
- Died: February 18, 1993 (aged 75); Sundance, Utah, US
- Occupations: Production designer Art director
- Years active: 1950–1992

Edward S. Haworth (September 26, 1917 – February 18, 1993) was an American production designer and art director. Active from 1950 to 1992, he was the production designer or art director on more than 50 feature films. He won an Academy Award for Best Art Direction for Sayonara (1957) and was nominated for the same award for five other films: Marty (1955), Some Like It Hot (1959), Pepe (1960), The Longest Day (1962), and What a Way to Go! (1964).

== Early years ==
Haworth was born in Cleveland in 1917 and grew up in the suburb of Willoughby, Ohio. His father, William, was a playwright and theatrical producer. He attended the University of Southern California.

== Art direction ==
Haworth began working in the motion picture business as an illustrator, set designer, and assistant art director at Warner Brothers. His first screen credit as art director was in 1951 on Alfred Hitchcock's Strangers on a Train.

He earned his first Academy Award nomination for art direction on Marty (1955). His work on Marty has been described as "an extraordinary example of the monochrome world". He won the Oscar for art direction two year later for his work on Sayonara (1957). Writing in The New York Times, Bosley Crowther touted Haworth's work on Sayonara as "handsome Japanese surroundings—outdoor gardens, graceful, sliding-paneled homes and delicate teahouses, shown in colors of exceptional taste and blend."

He was also nominated for the same award for his work on Some Like It Hot (1959), Pepe (1960), The Longest Day (1962), and What a Way to Go! (1964). His other notable works include Friendly Persuasion (1956), Invasion of the Body Snatchers (1956), Ride the Wild Surf (1964), The Beguiled (1971), Jeremiah Johnson (1972), and The Sailor Who Fell From Grace With the Sea (1976).

== Personal life and later years ==
Haworth had three marriages, to Miriam Severy, Hallie Stagner, and Anna Wackevitch. All three marriages ended in divorce. He had four children: production designer Sean Haworth, pop artist Jann Haworth, and daughters Maria and Holly.

From 1973 until his death in 1993, Haworth lived in Sundance, Utah. He was in an automobile accident in December 1992 and developed a blood clot in his brain. He died three months later in February 1993, at age 75.

He was posthumously inducted into the Art Directors Guild Hall of Fame in 2009.

== Filmography ==
- Southside 1-1000 (1950, production designer)
- Strangers on a Train (1951, art director)
- Flight to Mars (1951, production design)
- Aladdin and His Lamp (1952, production designer)
- Mutiny (1952, art director)
- Without Warning! (1952, production designer)
- I Confess (1953, art director)
- Carnival Story (1954, production designer)
- Down Three Dark Streets (1954, production designer)
- His Majesty O'Keefe (1954, art director)
- The Kentuckian (1955, production designer)
- Marty (1955, art director)
- The Naked Street (1955, production designer)
- Friendly Persuasion (1956, art director)
- Invasion of the Body Snatchers (1956, production designer)
- The Bachelor Party (1957, art director)
- Four Girls in Town (1957, art director)
- Sayonara (1957, art director)
- I Want To Live! (1958, set decorator)
- The Goddess (1958, art director)
- The Naked and the Dead (1958, art director)
- Some Like It Hot (1959, art director)
- Middle of the Night (1959, production designer)
- Pepe (1960)
- Who Was That Lady? (1960)
- The Outsider (1961, art director)
- Escape from East Berlin (1962, production designer)
- The Longest Day (1962, art director for the American sequence)
- Ride the Wild Surf (1964, production designer)
- What a Way to Go! (1964, art director)
- Wild and Wonderful (1964, art director)
- The Glory Guys (1965, production designer)
- Maya (1966, art director)
- The Professionals (1966, art director)
- Seconds (1966, art director)
- The Way West (1967, art director)
- Half a Sixpence (1968, production designer)
- Villa Rides (1968, production designer)
- The Kremlin Letter (1970, production designer)
- The Beguiled (1971, production designer)
- The Getaway (1972, art director)
- Jeremiah Johnson (1972, art director)
- Pat Garrett and Billy the Kid (1973, art director)
- Claudine (1974, production designer)
- Harry and Tonto (1974, art director)
- The Killer Elite (1975, production designer)
- The Sailor Who Fell From Grace With the Sea (1976, production designer)
- Telefon (1977, production designer)
- Somebody Killed Her Husband (1978, production designer)
- Bloodline (1979, production designer)
- When You Comin' Back, Red Ryder? (1979, production designer)
- Rough Cut (1980, production designer)
- Carbon Copy (1981, production designer)
- Death Hunt (1981, production designer)
- Jinxed! (1982, production designer)
- Blame It on the Night (1984, production designer)
- The Legend of Billie Jean (1985, production designer)
- Poltergeist II: The Other Side (1986, production designer)
- *batteries not included (1987, production designer)
- Mr. Baseball (1992, production designer)

== See also ==
- Art Directors Guild Hall of Fame
