= 15th Golden Globe Awards =

Film award ceremony in 1958

- Date: February 22, 1958

Highlights
- Best Picture: The Bridge on the River Kwai

The 15th Golden Globe Awards, honoring the best in film for 1957 films, were held on February 22, 1958.

== Film ==
=== Best Film - Drama ===
The Bridge on the River Kwai

- Wild is the Wind
- Sayonara
- 12 Angry Men
- Witness for the Prosecution

=== Best Film - Comedy or Musical ===
Les Girls

- Don't Go Near the Water
- Love in the Afternoon
- Pal Joey
- Silk Stockings

=== Best Actor - Drama ===
Alec Guinness - The Bridge on the River Kwai

- Marlon Brando - Sayonara
- Henry Fonda - 12 Angry Men
- Anthony Franciosa - A Hatful of Rain
- Charles Laughton - Witness for the Prosecution

=== Best Actress - Drama ===
Joanne Woodward - The Three Faces of Eve

- Marlene Dietrich - Witness for the Prosecution
- Deborah Kerr - Heaven Knows, Mr. Allison
- Anna Magnani - Wild Is the Wind
- Eva Marie Saint - A Hatful of Rain

=== Best Actor - Comedy or Musical ===
Frank Sinatra - Pal Joey

- Maurice Chevalier - Love in the Afternoon
- Glenn Ford - Don't Go Near the Water
- David Niven - My Man Godfrey
- Tony Randall - Will Success Spoil Rock Hunter?

=== Best Actress - Comedy or Musical ===
Taina Elg - Les Girls
Kay Kendall - Les Girls

- Cyd Charisse - Silk Stockings
- Audrey Hepburn - Love in the Afternoon
- Jean Simmons - This Could Be the Night

=== Best Supporting Actor ===
Red Buttons - Sayonara

- Lee J. Cobb - 12 Angry Men
- Sessue Hayakawa - The Bridge on the River Kwai
- Nigel Patrick - Raintree County
- Ed Wynn - The Great Man

=== Best Supporting Actress ===
Elsa Lanchester - Witness for the Prosecution

- Mildred Dunnock - Peyton Place
- Hope Lange - Peyton Place
- Heather Sears - The Story of Esther Costello
- Miyoshi Umeki - Sayonara

=== Best Director ===
David Lean - The Bridge on the River Kwai

- Joshua Logan - Sayonara
- Sidney Lumet - 12 Angry Men
- Billy Wilder - Witness for the Prosecution
- Fred Zinnemann - A Hatful of Rain

=== Best Foreign Language Film ===
Confessions of Felix Krull (West Germany)
Tizoc (Mexico)
Woman in a Dressing Gown (United Kingdom)
Yellow Crow (Kiiroi karasu) (Japan)

=== Best Film Promoting International Understanding ===
The Happy Road

=== Henrietta Award (World Film Favorites) ===
Tony Curtis
Doris Day

=== Special Achievement Award ===
Hugo Friedhofer
Zsa Zsa Gabor
Bob Hope
LeRoy Prinz
Jean Simmons

== Television ==
=== Best TV Show ===
The Mickey Mouse Club

=== Television Achievement ===
Jack Benny
Eddie Fisher
Alfred Hitchcock
Mike Wallace

== New Star of the Year - Actor ==
James Garner
John Saxon
Patrick Wayne

== New Star of the Year - Actress ==
Sandra Dee
Carolyn Jones
Diane Varsi

== Cecil B. DeMille Award ==
Buddy Adler
