= Ellsworth Fredricks =

American cinematographer (1904–1993)

- Born: June 2, 1904; The Bronx, New York, U.S.
- Died: August 16, 1993 (aged 89); San Marcos, California, U.S.
- Occupation: Cinematographer

Ellsworth Fredricks (June 2, 1904 – August 16, 1993) was an American cinematographer. He was nominated for the Academy Award for Best Cinematography for the film Sayonara.

During World War II, he served in the United States Army Signal Corps as a major and as the official cinematographer of President Franklin D. Roosevelt. Fredericks died in August 1993 in San Marcos, California, at the age of 89.

== Selected filmography ==
- Invasion of the Body Snatchers (1956)
- Sayonara (1957)
- The Scorpio Letters (1967)
