= William Goetz =

American film producer (1903–1969)

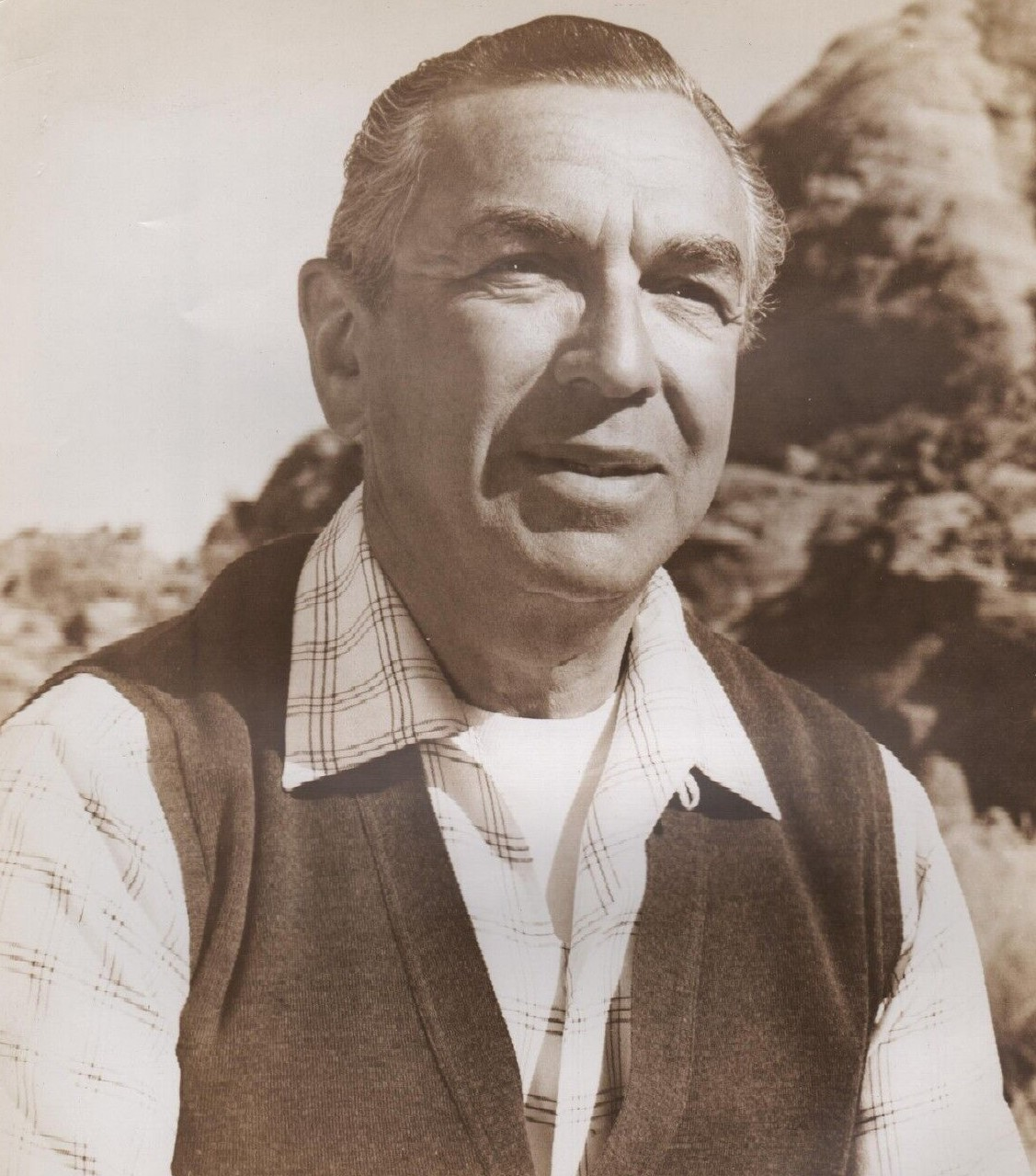
- Born: William B. Goetz; March 24, 1903; Philadelphia, Pennsylvania, U.S.
- Died: August 15, 1969 (aged 66); Holmby Hills, Los Angeles, California, U.S.
- Resting place: Hillside Memorial Park Cemetery
- Other name: Bill Goetz
- Occupations: Film producer, studio executive
- Years active: 1924–1966
- Spouse: Edith Mayer (m. 1930–1969)
- Children: 2
- Relatives: Louis B. Mayer (father-in-law); Irene Mayer Selznick (sister-in-law); David O. Selznick (brother-in-law)

William B. Goetz (March 24, 1903 – August 15, 1969) was an American film producer and studio executive. Goetz was one of the founders of Twentieth Century Pictures, and later served as vice president of 20th Century Fox after the studio's merger with the Fox Film Company. At Universal-International, he served as the head of production from 1946 until 1953.

== Early life ==
Born to a Jewish working-class family in Philadelphia, Pennsylvania, Goetz was the youngest of eight children. His mother died when he was ten years old and shortly thereafter his father abandoned the family. Raised by older brothers, at the age of twenty-one he followed some of his brothers to Hollywood where he found work as a crew hand at one of the large studios. After a few years, he gained production responsibilities and, in 1930, was made an associate producer at the Fox Company.

== Career ==
In 1932, Goetz received the financial support necessary from his new father-in-law, Louis B. Mayer, to become a minor partner with Joseph Schenck, the former president of United Artists, and Darryl F. Zanuck from Warner Bros. to create Twentieth Century Pictures. Zanuck was named president, and Goetz served as vice-president.

Successful from the very beginning, their 1934 film The House of Rothschild was nominated for Academy Award for Best Picture. In 1935, Twentieth Century bought the financially strapped Fox Films to create 20th Century Fox.

Goetz served as vice president of 20th Century Fox, but in 1942, he took charge of the studio temporarily when Zanuck, a veteran of World War I, joined the United States military effort in World War II. Goetz liked the top role in the company, and after Zanuck returned, relationships became strained.

In 1943, Goetz resigned to form International Pictures, his own independent company with Leo Spitz, a former lawyer who worked as a movie company advisor. Their partnership ended its short-lived existence when they made a deal in July 1946 to merge with the British Rank Organisation's distribution arm and Universal Pictures.

Goetz was made president and placed in charge of production for the newly merged Universal-International studio. Although one of the studio executives who formulated the 1947 Waldorf Statement, Goetz later softened his stand on the issue.

In 1949, Goetz called upon his close friendship with MCA head Lew Wasserman, one of the more powerful agents in Hollywood.

They revolutionized the motion picture industry when they agreed to a deal where James Stewart was signed to a profit participation deal to act in a Universal film. In lieu of a salary for his performance, Stewart was guaranteed half of the film's profits, and the concept was negotiated for other stars who recognized the value of their own box-office drawing power.

In 1953, two years after Decca Records acquired the studio, Goetz was replaced by Edward Muhl in his position at Universal-International. Becoming an independent producer and making Sayonara, a 1957 film nominated for an Academy Award for Best Picture, he signed a six-picture deal with Columbia Pictures and produced Me and the Colonel, They Came to Cordura, The Mountain Road, Song Without End and Cry for Happy.

== Personal life ==
=== Marriage and children ===
In March 1930, Goetz married Edith Mayer (1905–1988), daughter of Metro-Goldwyn-Mayer studio head Louis B. Mayer – who was less than enthusiastic about the match. The couple had two daughters, Judith and Barbara. Goetz and Mayer remained married until his death in 1969.

Goetz's sister-in-law was theatrical producer Irene Mayer Selznick. Goetz's brother-in-law was film producer David O. Selznick to whom Irene was married from April 1930 to 1949.

=== Politics ===
Goetz was a liberal Democrat and enthusiastically campaigned for Adlai Stevenson II in the 1952 presidential election. The producer angered his Republican Party father-in-law, Louis B. Mayer, when he announced plans to host a party for Stevenson at the Beverly Hills Hotel.

Mayer was further angered when he learned that the party was to be co-hosted by film executive Dore Schary, the man with whom Mayer had worked with (and often fought with) at MGM and who replaced Mayer as the head of Metro in 1951. Although Mayer adored his daughter Edith, he had a difficult relationship with Goetz.

This episode further strained their relationship, and Mayer never spoke to his son-in-law again.

=== Hobbies ===
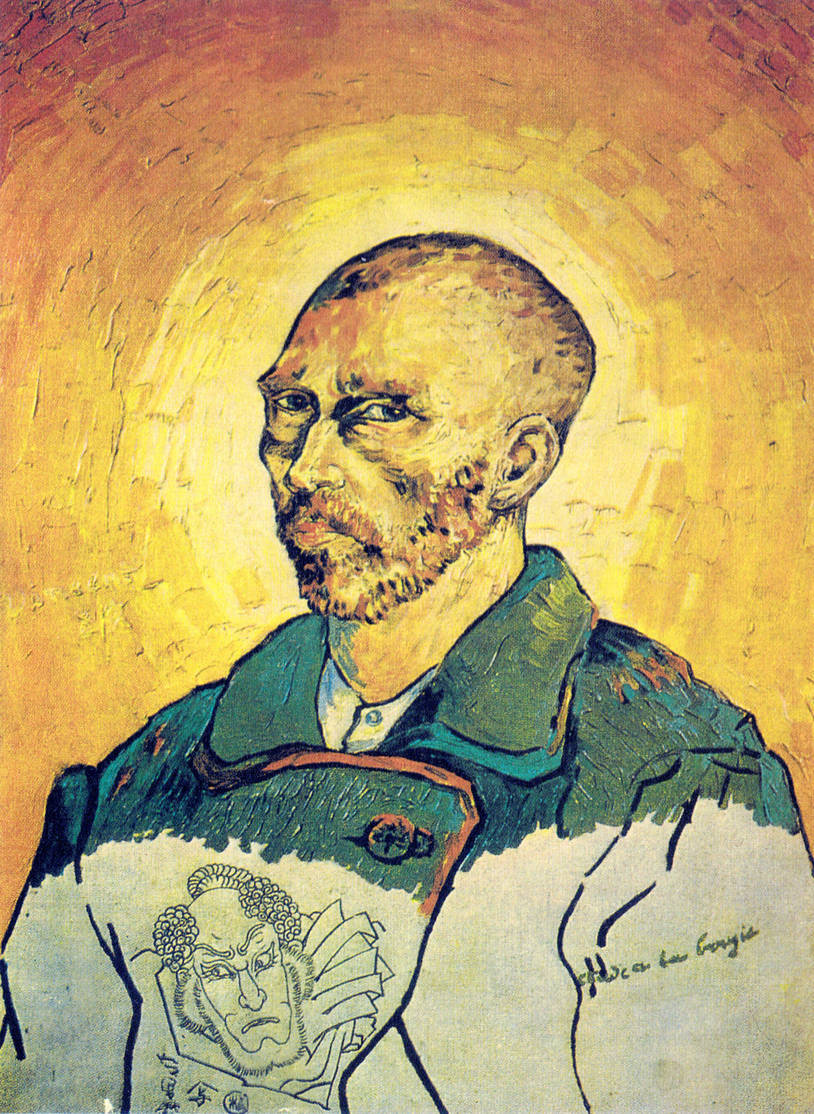
In 1949, a controversy erupted over the Vincent van Gogh self-portrait called Study by Candlelight

A very wealthy man, Goetz raised thoroughbred racehorses. His horse Your Host won the 1950 Santa Anita Derby and subsequently sired Kelso, a Hall of Fame inductee and one of the greatest horses in racing history.

Goetz and his wife also were major investors in art, acquiring a significant collection of Impressionist and Post-Impressionist works. They owned paintings and sculptures by artists such as Edgar Degas, Paul Gauguin, Claude Monet, Paul Cézanne, Berthe Morisot, Édouard Manet, Pierre-Auguste Renoir, Pablo Picasso, Amedeo Modigliani, Chaïm Soutine, Pierre Bonnard, Jean-Baptiste-Camille Corot, and Henri Fantin-Latour.

In 1949, a controversy erupted over a Vincent van Gogh self-portrait titled Study by Candlelight that Goetz had purchased two years earlier. The painting was declared a fake by art expert Willem Sandberg and the artist's nephew, V. W. van Gogh, resulting in an international debate among art experts.

The painting remained controversial and was not put up for auction with the rest of the Goetz collection following Edith Goetz's death in 1987. The painting was exhibited April 13–25, 2013 in the Nevada Museum of Art in Reno, Nevada.

=== Death ===
On August 15, 1969, Goetz died of cancer at his Holmby Hills, Los Angeles home at the age of 66. He was buried in Hillside Memorial Park Cemetery in Culver City, California.
