= Miyoshi Umeki =

Japanese-American actress and singer (1929–2007)

- 梅木 美代志
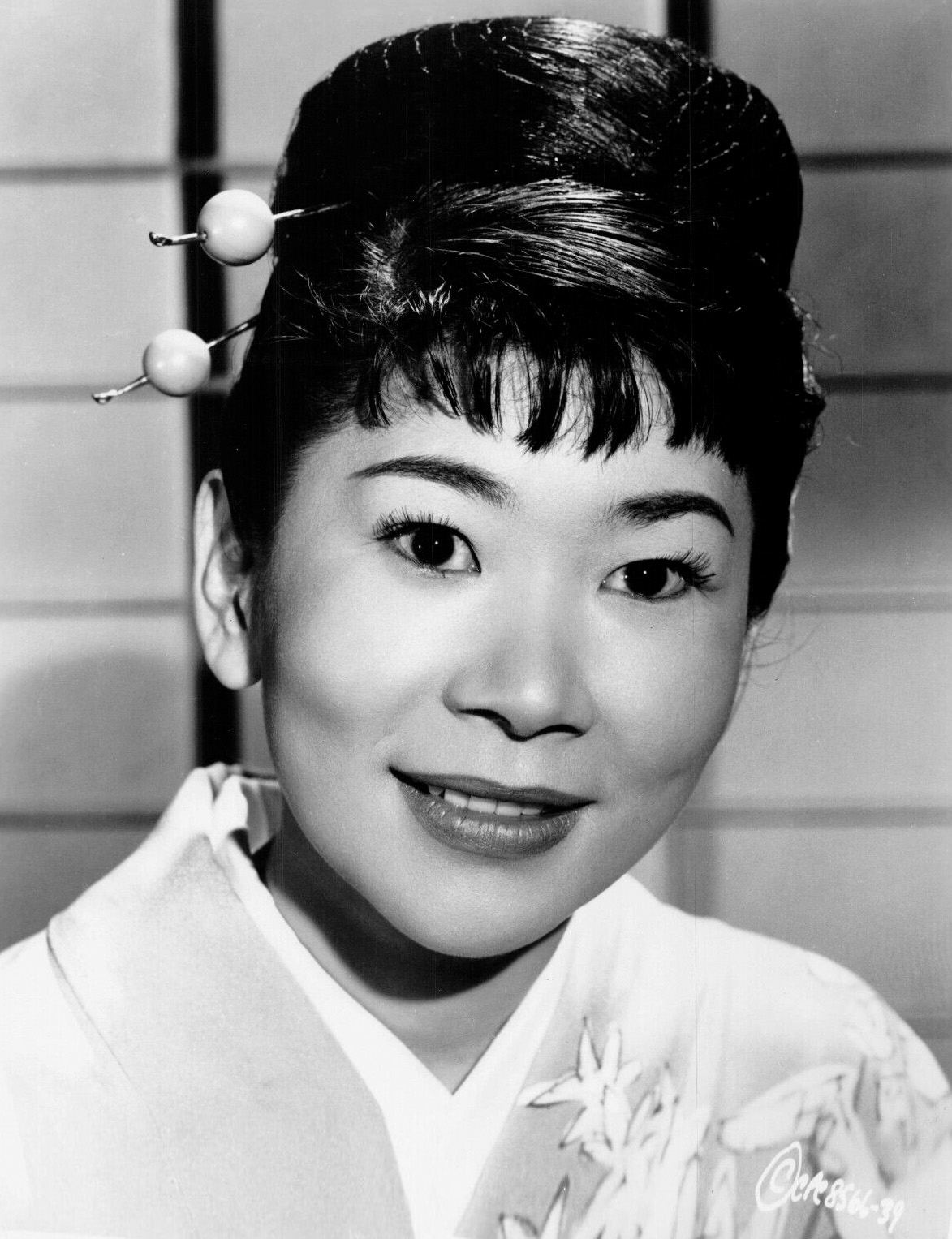
- Umeki in 1957
- Born: May 8, 1929; Otaru, Hokkaido, Japan
- Died: August 28, 2007 (aged 78); Licking, Missouri, U.S.
- Other name: Nancy Umeki
- Citizenship: japan(~1950); United States (from mid-1960s)
- Occupations: Singer, actress
- Years active: 1953–1972
- Spouses: Frederick Winfield "Wynn" Opie (m. 1958; div. 1967) Randall Firevod Hood (m. 1968; died 1976)
- Children: 1
- Awards: See below

Signature (Japanese)
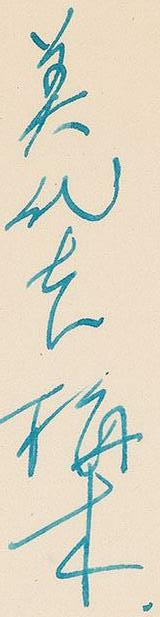

Japanese name
- Kanji: 梅木 美代志
- Hiragana: うめき みよし
- Katakana: ウメキ ミヨシ

Signature
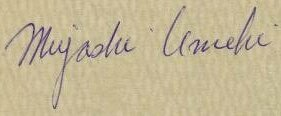

Miyoshi Umeki (梅木 美代志, Umeki Miyoshi; or ミヨシ・ウメキ Miyoshi Umeki, May 8, 1929 – August 28, 2007) was a Japanese and American singer and actress. She was the first East Asia-born woman to win an Academy Award for acting, winning Best Supporting Actress for her performance in Sayonara (1957). She was also a three-time Golden Globe nominee, and was nominated for a Tony Award for Best Actress in a Musical for her performance in Rodgers and Hammerstein's Flower Drum Song.

== Early life ==
Born in Otaru, Hokkaido, Umeki was the youngest of nine children. Her father owned an iron factory. After World War II, she began her career as a nightclub singer in Japan, using the name Nancy Umeki. Her early influences were traditional kabuki theater and American pop music. Later in one of her appearances on The Merv Griffin Show, she treated viewers to her impression of singer Billy Eckstine, one of her American favorites growing up.

== Career ==
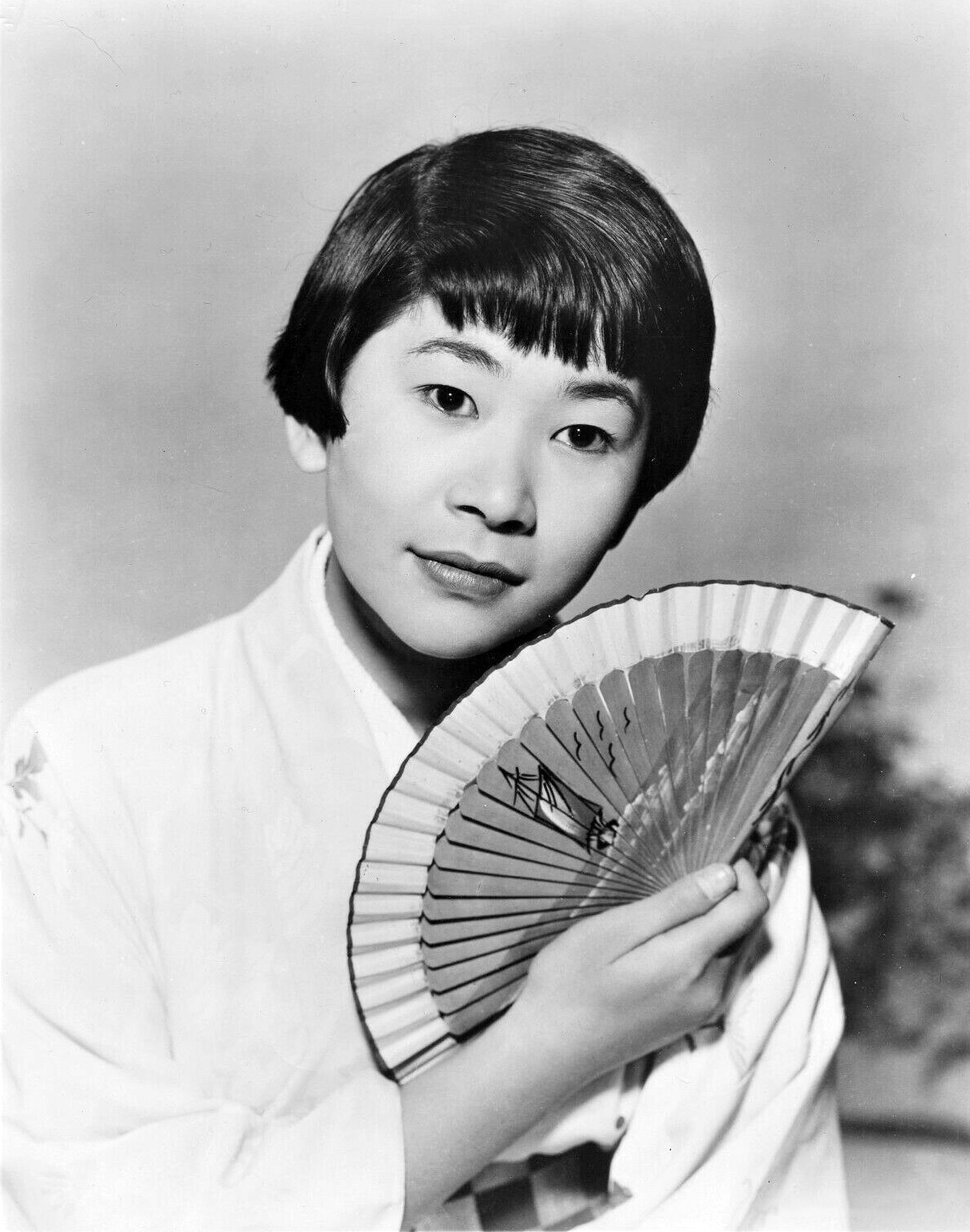
Umeki in a publicity photo for Sayonara (1957)

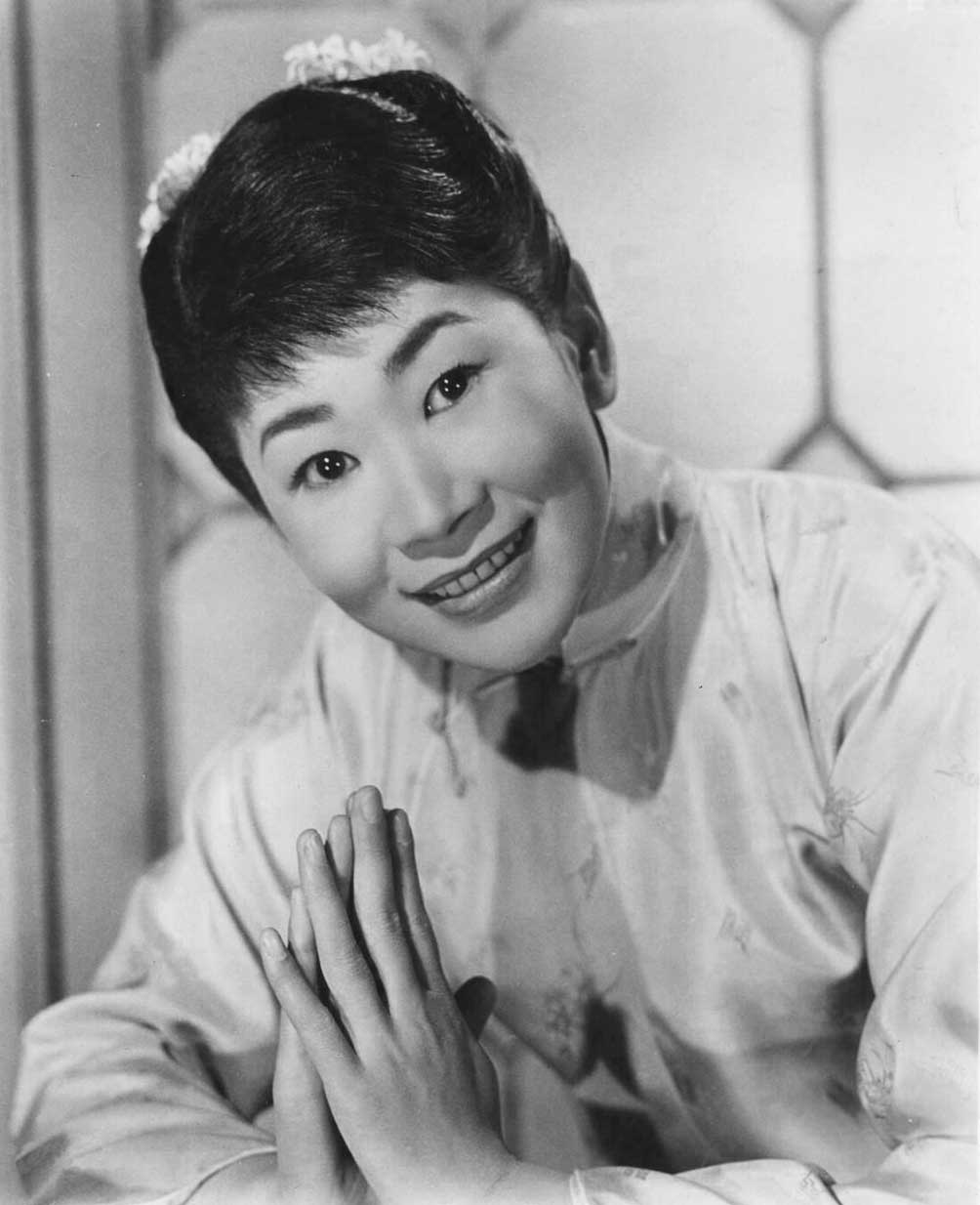
Umeki in a publicity photo for Flower Drum Song (1961)

Umeki was best known for her Oscar-winning role as Katsumi in Sayonara (1957), as Mei Li in both the Broadway musical and 1961 film Flower Drum Song, and as Mrs. Livingston in the television series The Courtship of Eddie's Father. She was a shin Issei, or post-1945 immigrant from Japan.

She recorded for RCA Victor Japan from 1950 to 1954 and appeared in the film Seishun Jazu Musume. She recorded mostly American jazz standards, which she sang partially in Japanese and partially in English, or solely in either language. Some of the songs she sang during this period were "It Isn't Fair", "Sentimental Me", "My Foolish Heart", "With A Song In My Heart", "Again", "Vaya con Dios", "(How Much Is) That Doggie in the Window?", and "I'll Walk Alone". She moved to the United States in 1955. After appearing on the Arthur Godfrey Talent Scouts (she was a series regular for one season), she signed with the Mercury Records label and released several singles and two albums. Her appearances on Godfrey's program brought her to the attention of director Joshua Logan, who cast her in Sayonara, for which she won an Academy Award for Best Supporting Actress. She was the first Asian to win an Academy Award for acting.

In 1958, she appeared twice on the variety show The Gisele MacKenzie Show in which she performed "How Deep Is the Ocean". That same year, she was also nominated for a Tony Award for Best Leading Actress in a Musical for her performance in the Broadway premiere production of Rodgers and Hammerstein's Flower Drum Song, where she played Mei Li. The show was directed by Gene Kelly and ran for two years. A cover story in Time stated "the warmth of her art works a kind of tranquil magic". Umeki appeared in Universal Studios' film adaptation of the musical in 1961. She was nominated for a Golden Globe Award for Flower Drum Song. Although a guest on many television variety shows, she appeared in only three more movies through 1962, including Cry for Happy (also 1961), The Horizontal Lieutenant (1962), and A Girl Named Tamiko (1963). From 1969 to 1972, she appeared in The Courtship of Eddie's Father as Mrs. Livingston the housekeeper, for which she was nominated for another Golden Globe Award. She retired from acting following the end of the series.

== Personal life and death ==
Umeki's first marriage, to television director Frederick Winfield "Wynn" Opie in 1958, ended in divorce in 1967. The couple had one son, Michael H. Opie, born in 1964. She married Randall Firevod Hood in 1968, and he adopted her son, changing the boy's name to Michael Randall Hood (February 11, 1964 – August 27, 2018). The couple operated a Los Angeles-based business renting editing equipment to film studios and university film programs. Randall Hood died in 1976. Her son, Michael Hood, was a police sergeant.

According to Umeki's son (who died 11 years after his mother), Umeki lived in Sherman Oaks, California, for a number of years, then moved to Licking, Missouri, to be near her son and his family, which included three grandchildren. Known as Miyoshi Hood, she died there on August 28, 2007, aged 78, from cancer.

== Discography ==
=== RCA Victor Japan (1950–1954) ===
During her singing career in Japan, Miyoshi recorded the following songs:

- "Sleepy My Love" (1950)
- "Under the Moonlight" (1950)
- "Don't Say That Person's Name" (1950)
- "Evening Whisper" (1950)
- "I Feel Like Crying" (1950)
- "I'm Waiting for You" (1950)
- "One Night of Sorrow" (1951)
- "Misery" (1951)
- "It Isn't Fair" (1951)
- "Sentimental Me" (1951)
- "My Foolish Heart" (1953)
- "Why Don't You Believe Me?" (live) (1953)
- "Again" (1953)
- "Manhattan Moon" (1953)
- "With A Song In My Heart" (1953)
- "I'll Walk Alone" (1953)
- "My Baby's Coming Home" (1953)
- "Silent Night" (1953)
- "I'm Walking Behind You" (1953)
- "(How Much Is) That Doggie in the Window?" (1953)
- "Sayonara (The Japanese Farewell Song)" (1953)
- "My Ichiban Tomodachi" (1953)
- "Vaya con Dios" (1954)
- "Kiss Me Again Stranger" (1954)
- "My Ichiban Tomodachi" (live) (1954)
- "Sayonara (The Japanese Farewell Song)" (live) (1954)

Two other Japanese language songs were recorded in 1952.

=== Singles on Mercury Records (1955–1959) ===
She signed with Mercury Records in 1955 and recorded the following 45 rpm singles:

- "How Deep Is the Ocean/Why Talk" (1955)
- "The Little Lost Dog/The Story You're About to Hear Is True" (1956)
- "The Mountain Beyond the Moon/Oh What Good Company We Could Be" (with Red Buttons) (1957)
- "Sayonara (The Japanese Farewell Song)/Be Sweet Tonight" (1957)
- "Sayonara/On and On" (1957)

Miyoshi recorded a version of "Pick Yourself Up" for Mercury Records in 1959, but the song was never released.

=== Albums on Mercury Records ===
Miyoshi Sings For Arthur Godfrey (MG-20165) (1956)
Tracks:

- "If I Give My Heart to You"
- "China Nights (支那の夜 Shina no yoru)"
- "I'm in the Mood for Love"
- "My Baby's Coming Home"
- "How Deep Is the Ocean?"
- "Slowly Go Out of Your Mind"
- "Teach Me Tonight"
- "Hanna Ko San"
- "Can't Help Loving That Man"
- "'S Wonderful"
- "Over the Rainbow"
- "Sayonara (The Japanese Farewell Song)"

Miyoshi (album) (MG-20568) (1959)
Tracks:

- "My Heart Stood Still"
- "My Ship"
- "You Make Me Feel So Young"
- "They Can't Take That Away from Me"
- "Sometimes I'm Happy"
- "I'm Old Fashioned"
- "That Old Feeling"
- "Gone with the Wind"
- "Jeepers Creepers"
- "Wonder Why"
- "I Could Write a Book"

Miyoshi – Singing Star of Rodgers and Hammerstein's Flower Drum Song (MGW-12148) (1958) (reissue of the Arthur Godfrey album with some tracks replaced)
Tracks:

- "Sayonara"
- "If I Give My Heart to You"
- "China Nights (支那 の夜 Shina no yoru)"
- "I'm in the Mood for Love"
- "My Baby's Coming Home"
- "How Deep Is the Ocean?"
- "Slowly Go Out of Your Mind"
- "Teach Me Tonight"
- "Hanna Ko San"
- "Can't Help Loving That Man"
- "Over the Rainbow"
- "The Little Lost Dog"

=== Film themes ===
Miyoshi Umeki recorded two theme songs for films in which she appeared:

- "Sayonara" for Sayonara (1957)
- "Cry for Happy" for Cry for Happy (1961)

=== Cast recordings ===
Flower Drum Song (Broadway Original Cast; 1958), Sony Records
Flower Drum Song (Film Soundtrack; 1961), Decca Records

Tracks by Miyoshi Umeki:

- "A Hundred Million Miracles"
- "I Am Going to Like It Here"
- "Don't Marry Me"
- "Wedding Parade/A Hundred Million Miracles"

== Filmography ==
Film
Year	Title	Role	Notes
1953	Seishun Jazz musume (青春ジャズ娘 Seishun jazu musume)	Kashu (歌手, "singer" in Japanese)	
1956	Around the World Revue	Nancy Umeki	Also known as Universal Musical Short 2655: Around the World Revue
1957	Sayonara	Katsumi	Academy Award for Best Supporting Actress; Nominated – Golden Globe Award for Best Supporting Actress – Motion Picture
1961	Cry for Happy	Harue	
1961	Flower Drum Song	Mei Li	Nominated – Golden Globe Award for Best Actress – Motion Picture Musical or Comedy
1962	The Horizontal Lieutenant	Akiko	
1962	A Girl Named Tamiko	Eiko	

== Television ==
Television
Year	Title	Role	Notes
1955	Arthur Godfrey and His Friends	Herself	Regular performer
1957	The Perry Como Show	Herself	1 episode
1958–1961	The Dinah Shore Chevy Show	Herself	episode #2.32 (1958) episode #4.16 (1960) episode #5.17
1958	What's My Line?	Herself – Mystery Guest	episode #414 (dated May 11, 1958)
1958	The Ford Show (Tennessee Ernie Ford)	Herself	episode #2.25
1958	Bing Crosby's White Christmas: All-Star Show	Herself	episode: "It Might as Well Be Spring"
1959	The Pat Boone Chevy Showroom	Herself	episode #2.2
1959	Toast of the Town	Singer	
1961	Here's Hollywood	Herself	episode dated December 27, 1961
1961–1962	The Donna Reed Show	Kimi	2 episodes: "The Geisha Girl" (1961) and "Aloha, Kimi" (1962)
1962	The Andy Williams Show	Herself	episode dated October 11, 1962 episode dated December 13, 1962
1962	Hallmark Hall of Fame	Lotus-Blossom	episode: "The Teahouse of the August Moon"
1962	Sam Benedict	Sumiko Matsui	episode: "Tears for a Nobody Doll"
1963	Rawhide	Nami	episode: "Incident of the Geisha"
1963	Dr. Kildare	Hana Shigera	episode: "One Clear Bright Thursday Morning"
1964	Burke's Law	Mary 'Lotus Bud' Ling	episode: "Who Killed the Paper Dragon?"
1964	The Virginian	Kim Ho	episode: "Smile of a Dragon"
1964	Mister Ed	Ako Tenaka	episode: "Ed in the Peace Corps"
1964	The Celebrity Game	Herself	episode dated April 19, 1964
1969	The Queen & I	Japanese Bride	episode: "The Trousseau"
1969–1972	The Courtship of Eddie's Father	Mrs. Livingston	66 episodes; Nominated – Golden Globe Award for Best Supporting Actress – Series, Miniseries or Television Film
1971	This Is Your Life	Herself	For Bill Bixby
1971	The Pet Set	Herself	episode dated June 30, 1971
1971	The Merv Griffin Show	Herself	episode dated March 29, 1971
1972	Salute to Oscar Hammerstein II	Herself	CBS TV special

== Awards and nominations ==
Year	Award	Category	Nominated work	Results	Ref.
1957	Academy Awards	Best Supporting Actress	Sayonara	Won	
1957	Golden Globe Awards	Best Supporting Actress – Motion Picture	Sayonara	Nominated	
1961	Golden Globe Awards	Best Actress in a Motion Picture – Musical or Comedy	Flower Drum Song	Nominated	
1970	Golden Globe Awards	Best Supporting Actress – Television	The Courtship of Eddie's Father	Nominated	
1959	Tony Awards	Best Leading Actress in a Musical	Flower Drum Song	Nominated	
