= The World of Suzie Wong =

1957 novel by Richard Mason

- Author: Richard Mason
- Language: English
- Publisher: Collins
- Publication date: 1957
- Publication place: United Kingdom
- Media type: Print (hardback and paperback)
- Pages: 383 pp

The World of Suzie Wong is a 1957 novel by British writer Richard Mason. The main characters are Robert Lomax, a young British artist living in Hong Kong, and Suzie Wong, the title character, a Chinese woman who works as a prostitute. The novel has been adapted into a play (opening on Broadway in 1958 starring France Nuyen and William Shatner), a 1960 film (starring Nancy Kwan and William Holden), and a ballet. Other authors have written two unofficial sequels.

== Plot ==
Robert Lomax is a young Briton who, after completing his National Service, goes to work on a plantation in British Malaya. During his time in Malaya, Lomax decides to pursue a new career as an artist for a year.

Lomax visits Hong Kong in search of inspiration for his paintings. He checks into the Nam Kok Hotel, not realising at first that it is a brothel catering mainly to British and American sailors. However, this only makes the hotel more charming in Lomax's eyes, and a better source of subject matter for his paintings.

Lomax quickly befriends most of the hotel's bargirls, but is fascinated by the archetypal "hooker with a heart of gold", Suzie Wong. Wong previously introduced herself to him as Wong Mee-ling, a rich virgin whose father owns four houses and more cars than she can count, and who later pretends not to recognise him at the hotel. Lomax had originally decided that he would not have sex with any of the bargirls at the hotel because he lacks the funds to pay for their services. However, it soon emerges that Suzie Wong is interested in him not as a customer but as a serious love interest. Although Wong becomes the kept woman of two other men, and Robert Lomax briefly becomes attracted to a young British nurse, Lomax and Wong are eventually united and the novel ends happily with them marrying.

== Development ==
Mason received inspiration to create the novel when he stayed at the Luk Kwok Hotel in 1956 and observed the prostitution services offered there.

== Film, TV and theatrical adaptations ==
The novel was adapted into a stage play in 1958 by Paul Osborn, directed by Joshua Logan, produced by David Merrick, and starred William Shatner and France Nuyen. Tsai Chin played the title role in the West End 1959 production.

The story was later adapted into the 1960 film largely based on the earlier play, directed by Richard Quine and starring William Holden, Nancy Kwan, Sylvia Syms, and Michael Wilding. Ray Stark was the Executive Producer. Originally France Nuyen was to repeat the role, but she fell ill and had to be replaced by Nancy Kwan.

In March 2006, the Hong Kong Ballet premiered a dance adaptation by Stephen Jefferies, entitled Suzie Wong.

In 2010, scenes from Stephen Jefferies' ballet were used by director Brian Jamieson in the film biography To Whom It May Concern: Ka Shen's Journey, to draw parallels between the screen character of Suzie Wong and the life of actress Nancy Kwan.

== Sequels ==
In 2008, Sebastian Gerard wrote an unauthorised sequel to the novel, For Goodness Sake: the Afterlife of Suzie Wong. The book is set in 1998 Hong Kong, 47 years after the events in Mason's book. Gerard's novel explores the experience of Dr. Marco Podesta, a Vietnam War veteran in Hong Kong for research. The book is Gerard's interpretation of what might have happened after the ending of the film, which was slightly more ambiguous than the ending in Mason's novel. Gerard's novel speculates that there might have been a real Robert and Suzie, who were the inspiration for the story, and that only through them could we know if such an improbable romance might have endured.

An unofficial modern interpretation of the World of Suzie Wong by Leon Pang was written in 2010 titled Suzie. A character in the book takes the name of Suzie Wong in an attempt to latch on to the fame of the original character. The novel explores 60 years of changes in Hong Kong and themes include poverty, the rise of China, global employment instability in 2008, outsourcing and the failings of capitalism.

== Locations ==
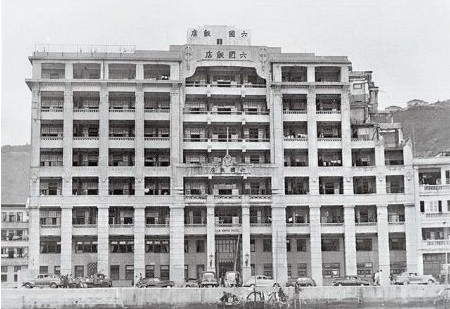
The Luk Kwok Hotel in 1933 facing Victoria Harbour

The Nam Kok Hotel featured in the story is based on the Luk Kwok Hotel on Gloucester Road in Wan Chai, where Mason stayed, although the building is now more modern, the site having been redeveloped in the 1980s. Also, unlike the hotel in the book, the modern hotel is not a brothel, but is one of many small smart hotels on Hong Kong Island.

== Reception ==
The novel received good reviews during its release.

== See also ==
- Prostitution in Hong Kong
