= The World of Suzie Wong (play) =

1958 stage play

- Original language: English
- Written by: Paul Osborn
- Characters: Suzie Wong; Robert Lomax
- Setting: 1950s Hong Kong

Premiere
- Date: October 14, 1958
- Place: Broadhurst Theatre, Broadway district, Manhattan, New York County, New York City, New York State, United States of America

The World of Suzie Wong is a 1958-premiered stage play, adapted from the eponymous 1957 novel by Richard Mason, The World of Suzie Wong. The play was in turn adapted into the 1960 Hollywood British-American feature film The World of Suzie Wong. The novel was adapted into a play by playwright Paul Osborn. It is one of the major elements of the Suzie Wong franchise.

== Plot ==
The play dramatizes the story of the eponymous Richard Mason novel, The World of Suzie Wong, upon which it is based.

== History ==
The play opened for the 1958-1959 Broadway season in New York City on October 14, 1958. It opened at the Broadhurst Theatre for the 1958–1959 season, and went on to the 54th Street Theatre for the 1959–1960 season. It closed its first Broadway run on January 2, 1960. The Broadway run was directed by Joshua Logan, with sets designed by Jo Mielziner, and costumes designed by Dorothy Jeakins; and starring France Nuyen as Suzie Wong, and William Shatner as Robert Lomax. During its first shows, the play was constantly improved from being a turgid drama to having a more comedic tone, evolving from a play that was panned to an award-winning play. At the time she was cast, France Nuyen spoke little English and learned her lines phonetically. Mary Mon Toy also gained notability through her role as Minnie Ho in the Broadway production.

The play opened for the 1959-1960 West End season in London. The West End run starred Tsai Chin as the title character. Peter Coe later signed on as director.

== Film adaptation ==
The play was adapted into an eponymous motion picture feature film, The World of Suzie Wong, that premiered in 1960. France Nuyen, who played Suzie Wong on Broadway, would go on to be cast for the film adaptation, but fell ill during filming, and needed to be replaced by Nancy Kwan. In lieu of William Shatner, the film cast an older male lead, William Holden, which changed the dynamic between the male and female leads.

== Awards and honours ==
- Winner: 1959 Theatre World Award — France Nuyen as Suzie Wong
- Winner: 1959 Theatre World Award — William Shatner as Robert Lomax
- Nominee: 1959 Tony Awards Best Costume Design (Play or Musical) — Dorothy Jeakins
