= Geeta Novotny =

American singer & actor

- Born: Geeta Bhatnagar; St. Louis, Missouri, U.S.
- Occupations: Musician, actor, journalist
- Instrument: Vocals
- Years active: since 1994
- Website: geetanovotny.com

Geeta Novotny (born Geeta Bhatnagar) is an American singer, actor, writer and columnist. As a classical singer, Novotny has performed principal roles nationally with opera companies and symphony orchestras at Carnegie Hall, the American Ballet Theatre, the Metropolitan Opera, the Los Angeles Opera and the Aspen Music Festival. Novotny has sung lead vocals on film soundtracks and has a career as a principal stage and film actor. She is also a project leader and roster artist for the charitable organization Sing For Hope. Novotny is an artist on the David Lynch Foundation Music Online Record Label.

Novotny and her sister, Dana, comprise the vocal duo The Bhatnagar Sisters. They released their first CD in 2002 entitled Duets. This duo performs everything from opera and art song to musical theatre, pop, and jazz works.

== Early life and education ==
In 1998, Novotny graduated with a Bachelor of Fine Arts in Vocal Performance from Carnegie Mellon University in Pittsburgh, PA, where she was a two-time recipient of the Harry G. Archer Award Scholarship and the Charlotte Black Memorial Scholarship.

== Career highlights ==
=== 2002 to 2004 ===
In 2002, Novotny completed the apprenticeship with the Utah Opera where she toured. Prior to that, she performed as the First Prioress in Dialogues des Carmélites with the Aspen Opera Theater Center and performed the title role in Rossini's La Cenerentola with the Fort Worth Touring Opera.

Novotny made her solo debut at Carnegie Hall in 2002 as a soloist in Mendelssohn's A Midsummer Night's Dream. The Sisters first performed this work at the Aspen Music Festival with the Aspen Chamber Symphony.

Some highlights include performances as the alto soloist, along with her soprano sister, Dana Bhatnagar-Vachharajani, in Mozart's Requiem with the Pro Arte Chorale and the Haddonfield Symphony in 2004. Prior to that, Novotny made her New Jersey Symphony Orchestra debut as a soloist in Much Ado About Shakespeare. These performances she reprised with her sister; performing as the soloists in Mendelssohn's A Midsummer Night's Dream; along with performing the vocal solos of: Thomas Arne's Three Shakespeare Songs and Chilcot's Orpheus With His Lute.

Novotny and her sister were the Grand Prize Winners of the 2003 International Young Artist Peninsula Music Festival Competition in Palos Verdes, California. For Novotny and her sister, this achievement had been an addition to the above-mentioned honor of their Carnegie Hall debuts as the soloists in Mendelssohn's A Midsummer Night's Dream.

In 2003, Novotny performed as the mezzo-soprano soloist with the Metropolitan Opera Orchestra, with the American Ballet Theatre at the Metropolitan Opera House in Frederick Ashton's ballet The Dream. That same year, Novotny performed the role of Maddalena in Rigoletto with the Amarillo Opera.

=== 2005 to 2006 ===
In 2006 Novotny completed her third consecutive year with the Los Angeles Opera portraying the lead female role of Rosina in their nationally acclaimed tour of Figaro's American Adventure, an original children's adaptation of the opera The Barber of Seville. In 2005, Novotny made her mainstage principal role debut with the Los Angeles Opera as the Third Noble Orphan in Der Rosenkavalier.

That same year, Novotny sang the theme song and lead vocal solos for the soundtrack of the film Shanghai Red.

Also in these years, Novotny acted in three independent films: Mended Spectacle, A Mellow Apple, and A.S.K.. She has also performed off-Broadway as a principal actor and music composer with the South Asian Rasa Theater Company at the Theatre Row Theater in New York City.

=== 2007 to 2008 ===
Novotny performed as a soloist as the character of Magdalene in Splendor of Wagner with the Bakersfield Symphony Orchestra, the Roswell Symphony Orchestra, and the Santa Maria Philharmonic. She also performed the title role in the Handel opera Flavio with Pocket Opera in San Francisco.

That same year, Novotny performed the title role in Carmen with the Bakersfield Symphony Orchestra, the Roswell Symphony Orchestra, and the Santa Maria Philharmonic.

In 2008, Novotny reprised her Carmen with Christopher Campbell as Don José, for concerts with the Trinity Lutheran Manhattan Beach Concert Series and the RHUMC Concert Series in Southern California. Also that year, Novotny performed as a soloist for the annual Holiday Concert at the Hearst Castle under the auspices of the Pacific Repertory Opera. That same year, she also produced and sang the theme song, for the soundtrack for the penultimate edit of the documentary film Nancy Kwan – To Whom It May Concern: Ka Shen's Journey.

=== 2009 to 2010 ===
Novotny performed as the alto soloist in Beethoven's Symphony No. 9 and as a soloist in a concert of music Music from the French Revolution both with the Bakersfield Symphony Orchestra. Also in that season, Novotny portrayed Carmen with the Intimate Opera.

=== 2010 to present ===
In 2011, Novotny performed concerts at venues such as The Music in the Mansion Recital Series at the historical Beverly Hills Greystone Mansion and The Previews Concerts Series in Manhattan Beach, California, and at California State University, Bakersfield.

Novotny performed as a soloist in Mendelssohn's A Midsummer Night's Dream with the Bakersfield Symphony Orchestra and the Bakersfield Masterworks Chorale.

Upcoming in 2011, Novotny will also be headlining at a concert at the Musical Instrument Museum (MIM) in Phoenix, Arizona.

=== Other performance experience ===
Novotny's other roles include Le Mort in Stravinsky's Le rossignol with the Aspen Opera Theater Center; and Mrs. Nolan in The Medium with the 92nd Street Y in New York City.

Her musical theatre roles include: Anita in West Side Story, Mrs. Jones in Street Scene, Dolly in Hello Dolly!, Baroness Schrader in The Sound of Music, and Lucinda in Into the Woods.

She has also performed as the alto soloist in oratorio works such as: Vivaldi's Gloria, Handel's Messiah, the Bach Magnificat, the Mozart Coronation Mass, Libby Larsen's Eleanor Roosevelt, and has been a soloist with Pittsburgh's, River City Brass Band.

=== Journalist and teacher ===
Novotny is also a writer as she was a music columnist and contributing writer for the New York City-based magazine The Indian American from 2006 to 2009.

Novotny is also a voice teacher.

== Charitable endeavors ==
=== David Lynch Foundation ===
Novotny and Summers in the production of Ave Maria

Novotny was a launching artist with the David Lynch Foundation Music Online Record Label.

DLF Music released an audio and video track of Novotny performing the Gounod / Bach Ave Maria with Andy Summers, on electric guitar. All funds raised went to support the work of DLF.

=== Sing For Hope ===
She is a project leader and roster artist for the charitable organization Sing For Hope. Novotny has sung under the auspices of Sing For Hope for concerts honoring Muhammad Yunus; and for the 2008 Fortune Most Powerful Women's Summit.

As the West Coast Project Leader for Sing For Hope, Novotny arranged a benefit concert for Sing For Hope in partnership with the 2010 International Women's Festival in Santa Barbara, California.

== CD release ==
- 2002: Duets - Dana and Geeta Bhatnagar
