= Twilight Time (home video label) =

Specialty DVD and Blu-ray label releasing limited editions of classic and vintage films

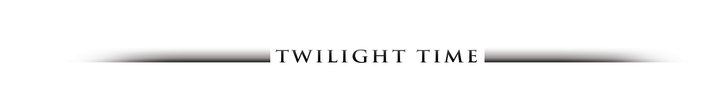
- Type: Private
- Industry: Home video
- Founded: 2011
- Founder: Brian Jamieson; Nick Redman
- Defunct: June 30, 2020
- Fate: Absorbed by Screen Archives Entertainment, effective July 1, 2020
- Headquarters: Auburn, Washington, U.S.
- Products: DVDs and Blu-rays
- Owner: RED JAM, LLC.
- Website: Screen Archives

Twilight Time was a boutique home media label specializing in releasing limited edition DVD and Blu-ray discs of classic films, founded in 2011. All titles were sold online exclusively through Screen Archives Entertainment until July 1, 2015, when the company launched its own online store.

On May 9, 2020, Twilight Time announced it would be ceasing operations on June 30, 2020. That same month, Screen Archives Entertainment announced that it had reached an agreement to acquire the rights to Twilight Time's back catalogue and inventory, consisting of 380 films in total.

== History ==
Twilight Time began in 2011 as the brainchild of Brian Jamieson and Nick Redman, both veterans of the motion picture and music industry. Both founded the company as a way to release vintage films for the classic DVD collector. Initially, Twilight Time licensed 20 films from 20th Century Fox's catalog to release on DVD and, when possible, in high definition on Blu-ray. The goal was to release films of varying genres that had never been released on home video in the United States. Twilight Time's initial focus was on films of the 1950s and 1960s in what Redman called "the Cinemascope period, those gorgeous widescreen entertainments that had it all—beauty, glamour, drama." But, he added, "We will also be selectively tackling the earlier years—the 1930s and 40s—and sampling every genre, presenting, hopefully, something for everyone." Ultimately, according to Jamieson, "Twilight Time will be serving both the collectible drive of film enthusiasts, and, in a larger sense, the cause of cinema literacy." Their first title, The Kremlin Letter, was scheduled to be released on January 25, 2011, but for unknown reasons, the release was pushed back by two months.

On September 1, 2011, Twilight Time announced a deal with their second film studio, Sony Pictures, to license and release titles from the Columbia Pictures library beginning in November 2011. The first titles to be released under this partnership included Ray Harryhausen's 1961 science fiction-fantasy classic, Mysterious Island, followed by the original Fright Night, the horror-comedy cult favorite written and directed by Tom Holland. Twilight Time only released Columbia Pictures on Blu-ray if a previous Sony DVD version is already available.

While initially limiting their releases to one title per month, Twilight Time later announced that beginning in November 2011, they would begin releasing two titles per month. Towards the end of 2013, releases began to see an output of three titles per month. In an interview with NixPix, Nick Redman confirmed that Twilight Time's monthly output would continue to increase, stating, "2014 is already shaping into a significant commitment of 50 to 60 titles," which means an average of four to five titles per month.

Twilight Time announced two new studio deals in 2013. Nick Redman confirmed a deal with MGM in September 2013. The deal includes all the United Artists catalog, MGM titles from 1986 to the present, and all of the titles released through Cannon, Polygram, and Orion. As well, Twilight Time announced its first international deal in October 2013 with Protagonist Pictures. The deal gave Twilight Time the US distribution rights to movies from the Film4 library, including films from directors Ken Loach, Neil Jordan, and Paul Greengrass.

On July 1, 2015, Twilight Time began direct-to-consumer sales when they announced they would begin offering their titles through their own website as an alternative to their existing sales through Screen Archives Entertainment.

=== Closure announcement and reacquisition ===
On May 10, 2020, Twilight Time announced the closure of the company. The company stated they will cease selling and producing discs on June 30, 2020. Their catalogue consists of 380 films in total.

However, on May 14, 2020, Screen Archives Entertainment announced per their official Facebook page that they had reached an agreement to purchase distribution rights to Twilight Time's back catalogue and inventory. In the announcement, Screen Archives wrote:

Screen Archives Entertainment has reached an agreement with Twilight Time Movies to purchase the company’s extensive Twilight Time Movies inventory or back catalog effective July 1, 2020. The agreement ensures that the Twilight Time label will continue indefinitely, according to the principals. Screen Archives has served as the primary distribution partner to Twilight Time since its beginning, working with the late Nick Redman and co-founder Brian Jamieson. Jamieson, a veteran studio executive and filmmaker will continue to provide marketing expertise and support to Screen Archives during the transition. Screen Archives president Craig Spaulding said, “Having worked with Brian and Nick over the years, we took this step because we have always enjoyed a good relationship with Brian (and Nick). We wanted to keep our relationship going and continue to capitalize on Brian’s years of expertise in the industry.

== Release approach ==
Due to the declining home video market for older and little-known films, most major film studios have opted to stop releasing those titles via conventional retail methods. Instead, studios like Warner Bros., Universal Pictures, Sony Pictures, and MGM have adopted a manufacture-on-demand (MOD) policy. Such titles are sometimes released on DVD-R recordable media, otherwise known as burn-on-demand (BOD); the two terms are not synonymous. MOD releases are designed to minimise costs, so often use existing transfers without any restoration or remastering, or extra features.

All Twilight Time titles are factory pressed DVDs and/or Blu-rays from a restored transfer. All titles are limited editions with only 3,000 units of each format created and are not repressed once sold out. As they are geared toward music aficionados, all feature an isolated music score. Additionally, all releases include an 8-page booklet on the film, with original essays, film stills and poster art. Other extras will be made available whenever possible.

== Controversy ==
In September 2012, Twilight Time released a collectors' edition Blu-ray of Night of the Living Dead (1990). It was supervised by original cinematographer Frank Prinzi, who tinted many of the scenes darker blue. Though director Tom Savini praised the reissue, fans complained. Others also noticed that some of the sound effects had been removed, such as the camera shutter sound that played over the end credits between photograph transitions. Twilight Time promised to alert customers if future editions of their discs differed from the original.

== Reissues ==
In June 2014, Twilight Time announced they were re-licensing some of their sold-out titles for re-release, a departure from their initial stance that all titles would be strictly limited to 3,000 units. Twilight Time did not re-release all their sold-out titles, only the ones they felt that they could improve upon. The reissues are completely new editions, standing out from the original releases; for instance, with new bonus features or new high-definition restorations. The first four reissues are to be released in 2015. Three of the first four reissues were Christine, Fright Night and Journey to the Center of the Earth.

== See also ==
- The Criterion Collection
- Arrow Films
- Blue Underground
- Severin Films
- Shout! Studios
- Synapse Films
- Warner Archive Collection
- Film Score Monthly
- Varèse Sarabande
- La-La Land Records
- Intrada Records
