= To Whom It May Concern: Ka Shen's Journey =

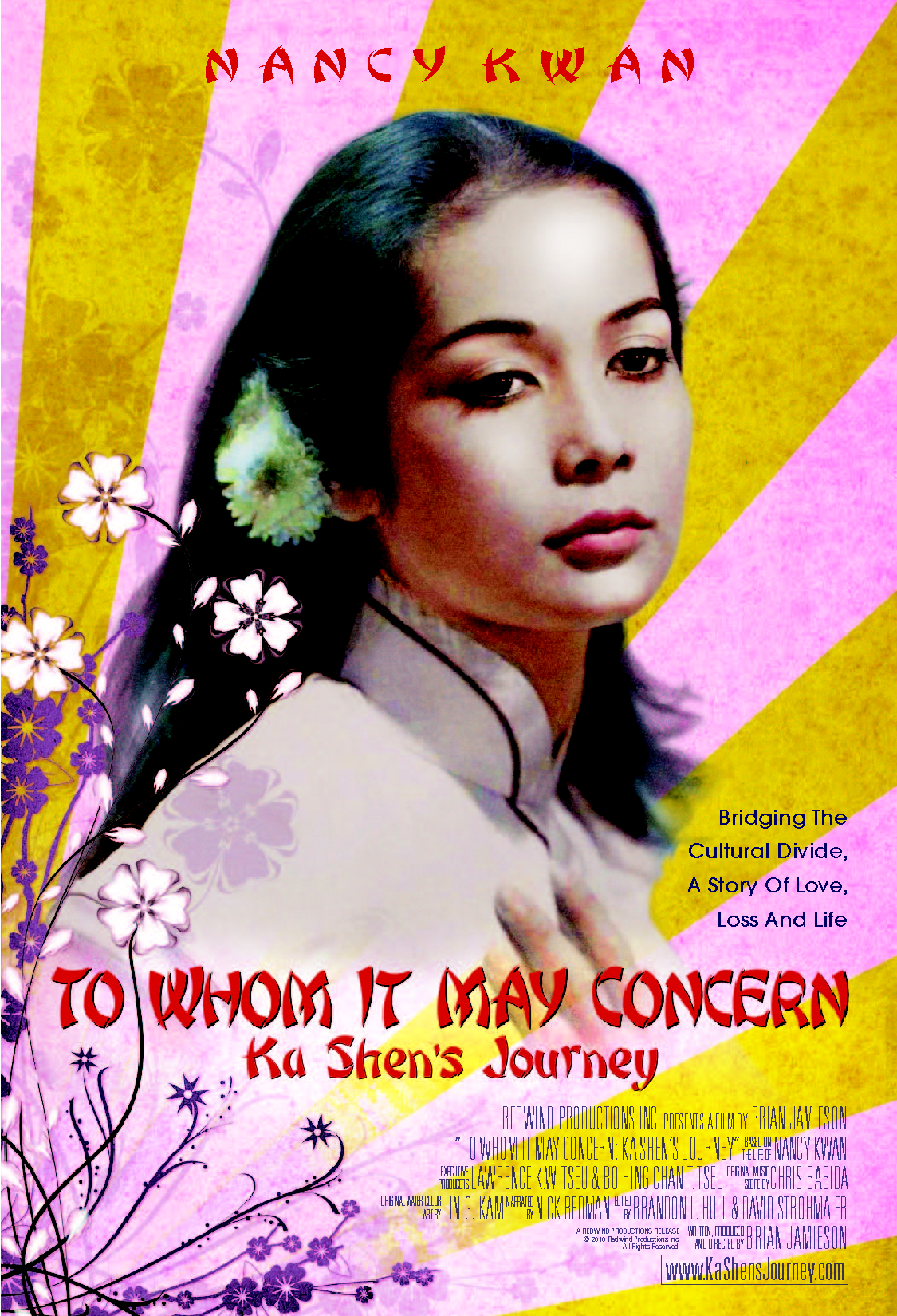
- Film release poster
- Directed by: Brian Jamieson
- Written by: Brian Jamieson
- Screenplay by: Brian Jamieson
- Produced by: Brian Jamieson; Lawrence K.W. Tseu; Bo Hing Chan Tseu
- Starring: Nancy Kwan; Sandra Allen; Marciano Batista; Joan Chen; Edward S. Feldman; Bey Logan; Norbert Meisel; France Nguyen; Vivian Wu
- Narrated by: Nick Redman
- Cinematography: Dave Strohmaier; Brandon L. Hull; Craig McCourry
- Edited by: Brandon L. Hull; David Strohmaier
- Music by: Chris Babida
- Production company: Redwind Productions
- Distributed by: Locomotive Distribution
- Release date: December 2009 (Women in Film Festival)
- Running time: 108 minutes
- Country: United States
- Languages: English; Cantonese

To Whom It May Concern: Ka Shen's Journey
- Chinese: 家倩的人生之旅
Transcriptions
Standard Mandarin
- Hanyu Pinyin: Jiā Qiàn de Rén Shēng Zhī Lǚ
Yue: Cantonese
- Jyutping: gaa1 sin6 dik1 jan4 sang1 zi1 leoi5

To Whom It May Concern: Ka Shen's Journey (Chinese: 家倩的人生之旅) is a 2009 docudrama about actress Nancy Kwan. Directed and written by former Warner Bros. executive Brian Jamieson, the film depicts Kwan's meteoric rise to fame when she was selected to star in the 1960 film The World of Suzie Wong and the 1961 film Flower Drum Song. In an era when White people played the Asian roles in Hollywood, Kwan's achievement was groundbreaking. The film portrays Kwan's being cast for inconspicuous roles after her early success.

To Whom It May Concern was filmed in locations in several countries, including Cambodia, Hong Kong, and the United States. In Cambodia's 12th-century temple Angkor Wat, Kwan grapples with the death of her son, Bernie Pock, from AIDS at the age of 33 in 1996.

The film is being screened in film festivals internationally. It was awarded "Best Feature Documentary" by American International Film Festival and WorldFest-Houston International Film Festival. Reviewers praised the documentary for its judicious use of archival footage and poignant interviews with Kwan. Several reviewers characterized the clips of Kwan's watching "The World of Suzie Wong" as unnecessary and unpolished.

== Background ==
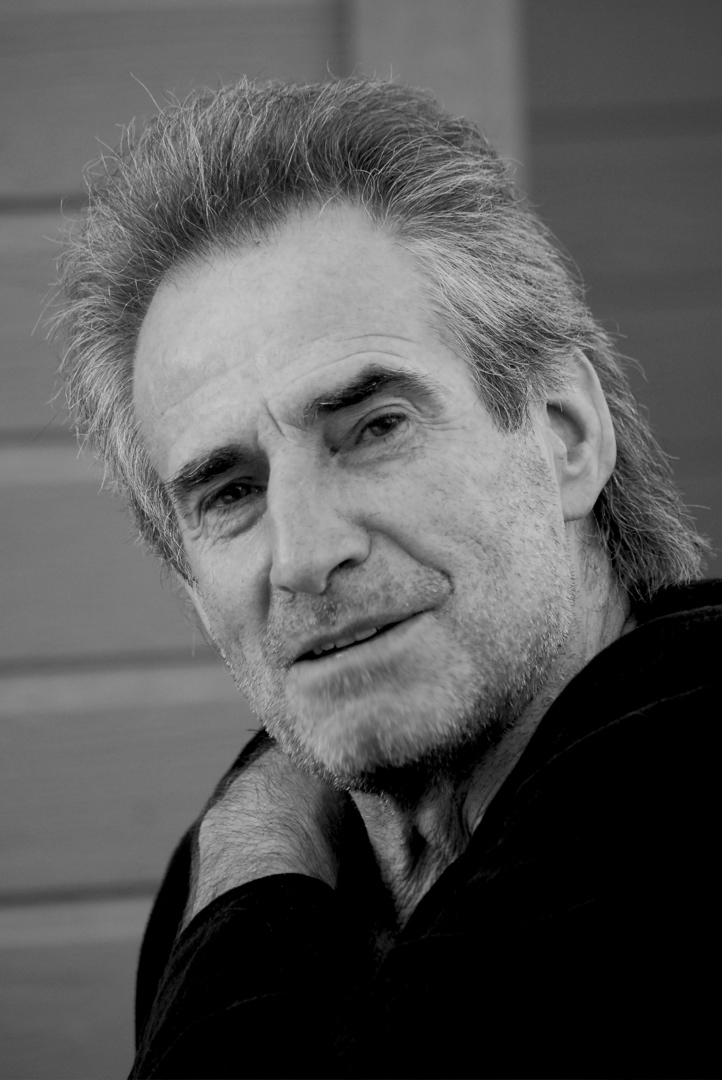
Director Brian Jamieson in 2009

A fan of Nancy Kwan's, Brian Jamieson, an executive at the home entertainment division of Warner Bros., started to examine her life while his company was deciding whether to re-release several of Kwan's films. As a youth in New Zealand, Jamieson watched movies in which Caucasian actors portrayed Asian characters. Pondering why studios made this decision, he was fascinated in 1960 when he watched The World of Suzie Wong by how Kwan became the first Asian lead in a Hollywood film. In 2000, Jamieson began trying to convince his colleagues to re-release three of Nancy Kwan's films, The Main Attraction, Honeymoon Hotel and Tamahine. After three fruitless years, he came up with a second idea: creating a 30-minute documentary of Kwan's life titled The World of Nancy Kwan and bundling it with five films. In addition to The Main Attraction, Honeymoon Hotel, Tamahine, all of which were owned by Warner Bros., Jamieson intended to include The World of Suzie Wong and Flower Drum Song. The latter two were owned by Paramount Pictures and Universal Studios, respectively, so he planned to license the films from the two companies. Saying that he viewed "a story here that was bigger than the sum of its parts", he decided to create the documentary. Jamieson said he hosted screenings at the Warner Bros. and that although people enjoyed the film, they did not promise to accept the project.

Jamieson met Kwan through her niece, Veronica Kwan-Rubinek, a financial analyst at Warner Bros. beginning in 1987. In 2003, Kwan-Rubinek phoned Jamieson, telling him a film archivist suggested that she consult Jamieson to find a film poster from The World of Suzie Wong. Jamieson possessed a collection of the posters he had prepared for a potential Kwan documentary. He brought them to Kwan-Rubinek's office. While they drank coffee together, Kwan-Rubinek perused the collection and selected one she admired. After Jamieson gave it to her, she discovered a second poster. She inquired whether he would give her that one too so she could give it to her aunt. Jamieson asked her who her aunt was, and she responded, "Nancy Kwan". Shocked, Jamieson, responded, "Oh, God! Had I known you were related to Nancy Kwan when you arrived at Warners in 1987, you would have been my best friend!" One month later, Kwan-Rubinek invited Jamieson to have lunch with herself, Nancy Kwan, and Linda Lo. Jamieson and Kwan discussed Jamieson's documentary plan and their favorite films—they both admired John Ford's The Searchers. The lunch lasted three hours and the two met later multiple times at the Sportsmen's Lodge to discuss how to order the film.

The film's title, To Whom it May Concern: Ka Shen's Journey, is a reference to two elements in Kwan's life. The greeting "to whom it may concern" is a connection to a crucial phrase in the 1960 film The World of Suzie Wong, in which Kwan starred. The subtitle alludes to Kwan's childhood Chinese name, Ka Shen.

== Production ==
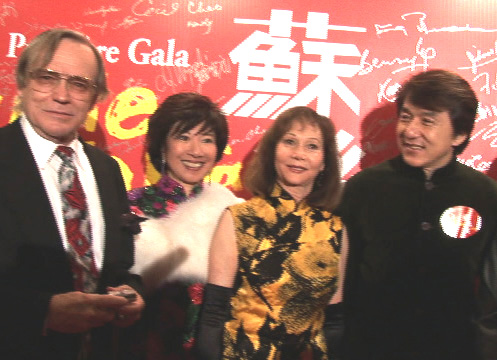
Norbert Meisel (Kwan's husband), Chairwoman of the Hong Kong Ballet Cissy Pao-Watari, Nancy Kwan, and Jackie Chan at the Sha Tin Town Hall at the Hong Kong Ballet's premiere gala of the ballet Suzie Wong on 17 March 2006

The film was shot in multiple countries. Several scenes in the film are filmed in Cambodia at its 12th-century temple complex Angkor Wat. Some scenes were shot in Hong Kong, and others in San Francisco, Los Angeles, and Kansas City. The film's international sales rights were purchased by New York-based Locomotive Distribution.

During the production process, Hong Kong Ballet contacted Kwan, asking if she would travel to Hong Kong and help them publicize their new ballet version of The World of Suzie Wong. Hong Kong Ballet would not fund the cost of trip. Jamieson wrote that Kwan was divided about whether to go. After traveling to Tokyo to attend their film festival in 2005, Jamieson visited Hong Kong for a brief period of time. He wrote that he serendipitously met the Hong Kong Ballet chairwoman at a Starbucks and negotiated a deal with her. He would pay for Kwan's traveling fees, and Hong Kong Ballet would allow him to film the performances. The deal contributed six-and-a-half minutes of ballet footage to the documentary. The ballet's music composer was Chris Babida. Touched by Babida's music, Jamieson chose him to compose the documentary's closing credits music, writing that Babida "could perfectly capture the differences between Nancy's cultural backgrounds".

The Angkor Wat temple complex scenes were filmed over a period of eight days beginning March 7, 2007. Jamieson rented a bus and hired a driver, a security guard, three cameramen, and an English-speaking guide. The setting was chosen because it was a "spiritual place", Kwan "leans towards the Buddhist beliefs", and it was a location in which Kwan perhaps would feel more able to discuss her son's death, Jamieson said.

== Synopsis ==
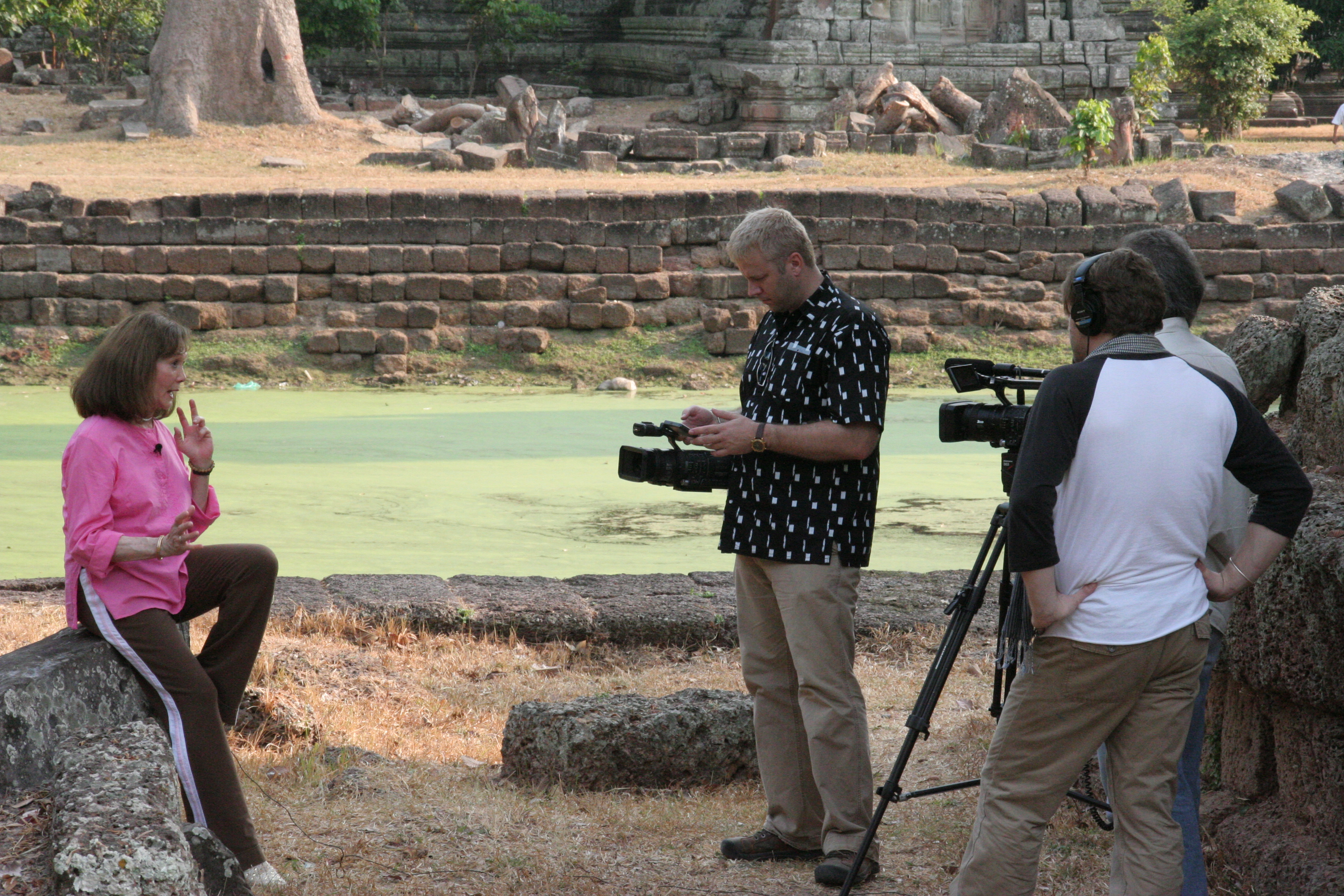
Nancy Kwan in Cambodia on March 5, 2007

The film largely proceeds chronologically with Kwan serving both as the person being interviewed and as the narrator. Her colleagues in Hollywood were generally interviewed in Los Angeles. Her family members and companions in her youth were interviewed in Hong Kong.

Born to a Chinese architect and a Scottish model, Nancy Kwan was more interested in dancing than acting. In her adolescence, she attended the Royal Ballet School in London. After returning to Hong Kong from London, she mingled with people who were in a fervor that Hollywood's The World of Suzie Wong would be filmed there. Following the withdrawal from contention of France Nuyen, who played Suzie Wong on Broadway, Kwan auditioned for the role, clinching it. Producer Ray Stark had noticed Kwan while she was watching the auditions and asked her to do a screen test.

Actress Joan Chen and film producer Bey Logan commented about Kwan's impact on the film industry for Asian actors. In an era when Caucasian actors played Asian roles because studios doubted Asians could achieve comparable success to whites at the box office, Kwan shattered the glass ceiling. When Kwan was cast in the lead role for the 1961 Flower Drum Song, she seemed to be in an era in which Asian actors were embraced. The entire cast was Asian. However, the time of Asian actors being cast in prominent roles proved fleeting. In the late 1960 to 1980s, she was able to land only a string of inconspicuous roles in films and TV series, such as The Wrecking Crew, Kung Fu (TV series), Hawaii Five-O, and The A-Team. In 1972, Kwan returned to Hong Kong to assist in caring for her sick father. Remaining in Hong Kong for ten years, she not only continued acting but also became a producer.

Director Brian Jamieson transitions from Kwan's stardom to her absolute love for her son, Bernhard Pock. Pock became a "poet, martial artist and stuntman". In 1995, he directed Rebellious, a small-budget film in which Kwan had a leading role. To Whom It May Concern depicted Nancy Kwan contending with the heartbreaking death of her son, Bernie, in 1996 at the age of 33. Pock had been infected with HIV from his girlfriend. He pleaded to his mother to visit and comfort his ailing girlfriend. Kwan said: "He asked me to go (help her) and I went. I did it for my son." Kwan was initially reluctant to talk about her son's death. Taking her to Cambodia on a spiritual trip, where she strode around the ruins of Angkor Wat, Jamieson convinced her to talk about the disheartening experience.

== Reception ==
=== Critical reception ===
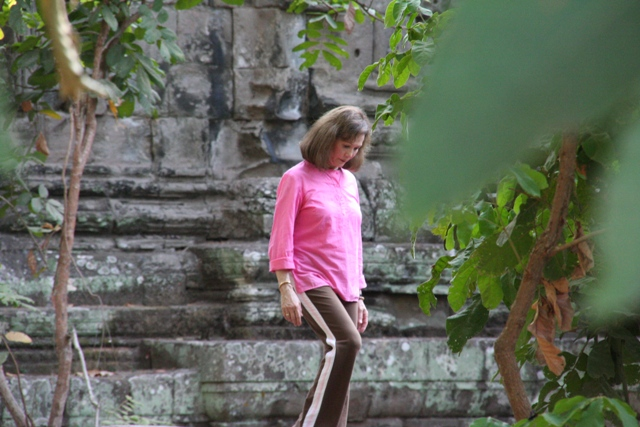
Nancy Kwan in Cambodia on March 5, 2007

Through highs and lows, triumph and heartache, Kwan perseveres and symbolizes hope for all. Crafting a celebration of Kwan’s life, director Brian Jamieson captivatingly portrays the progression of Asian-American actors in Hollywood and how Kwan inspired millions.

— Tanya Mohajerani of Cinequest Film Festival

Russell Edwards of Variety characterized the film as "solid if pedestrian". He praised the film's use of footage from Hong Kong wartime events as "well researched", but stated that the "awkward cutaways" of Kwan's attending Hong Kong Ballet's adaptation of The World of Suzie Wong should have been excised. Opining that the section about the death of Bernhard Pock, Kwan's son, is "tainted by an unhealed bitterness", he characterized Kwan's and Meisel's statements about Pock's wife as "rais[ing] more questions than they answer" and contaminating an "otherwise affectionate portrait". Sophia Dembling of the Dallas Observer agreed with Edwards that she preferred "fewer uncomfortably close shots" of Kwan's attendance at the Hong Kong Ballet adaptation. Dembling also wrote that the footage of Hong Kong before and during war was "fascinating" and that scenes from Kwan's movies and interviews were "interesting". Film critic Mel Neuhaus differed from Edwards' and Demblings's opinions about the film's portrayal of Kwan at the Hong Kong Ballet. He said that the footage "brilliantly sets this tale in motion" as a "remarkable framing story". Kwan, a dancer–actress, observes the dance performance, deliberating about " intertwining connections between her signature role and the tragic consequences of her post-movie star life. Neuhaus remarked that Kwan's "soulful pain [is] achingly evident".

Neuhaus had a generally positive impression of the film. He wrote, "The movie isn't merely a visual fan letter to a beautiful actress—it's perhaps the ultimate depiction of life imitating art."

According to the World Journal, Chinese people, who are bound by traditional ideas, frequently delay treatment for AIDS. Monterey, California, city councilman Mitchell Ing, stated that Kwan, whose son died of AIDS, hopes that the issue will gain more exposure when people watch the film.

Katelan Cunningham wrote in District Quarterly, a quarterly magazine published by Savannah College of Art and Design students, that despite the film's convincing her to see Kwan's initial films, it "did not do justice to Kwan". She criticized the film for being "hurried and at times haphazard", making the 104 minutes "laboriously long".

AsianWeek's Gregory Wong wrote that the documentary was a "very moving story" about Kwan's rise to stardom. Calling the film a "compelling and rousing journey" through Kwan's life, Tanya Mohajerani of Cinequest Film Festival praised its "vivid detail" in depicting both the happiness and trials Kwan faces. Actor and writer Jack Ong was engrossed by the film, writing that despite his having watched it many times, To Whom It May Concern is "such a satisfying, interesting and beautiful documentary that I definitely plan to watch it again and again". After watching the film at its premiere in Hong Kong, director Li Qiankuan, who chairs the China Film Association, told the audience: "I just saw this wonderful movie, and I'm very touched." Addressing Kwan, who was in attendance, he said, "You're a great movie star, but even more, you're a great mother with heart and courage."

=== Screenings ===
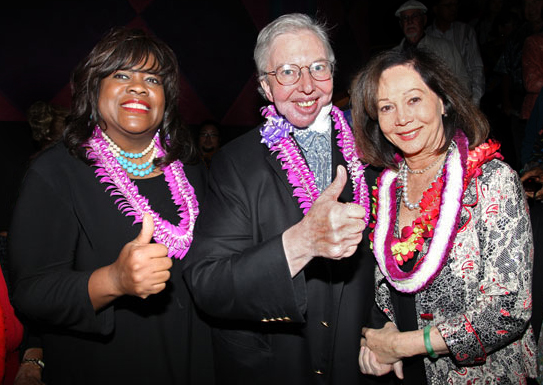
Roger Ebert and his wife Chaz Hammel-Smith gave the thumbs up to Nancy Kwan at the Hawaii International Film Festival on October 20, 2010.

To Whom It May Concern premiered in 2009 at the Women in Film and Television Association Film Festival. On March 22, 2010, it debuted to an approaching capacity in Hong Kong at the Hong Kong Convention and Exhibition Centre. Kwan attended the premiere, sitting in a front-row seat and shedding tears because, she said, "I'm still emotional". When she rose to speak to the attendees, they gave her a thunderous ovation. In April 2010, the film was screened at the Asia Premiere in Hong Kong and Singapore International Film Festival, as well as at the 2010 Kansas International Film Festival. The film was shown at the Hawaii International Film Festival on October 16, 2010, to a full theater.

On June 22, 2010, the documentary was screened at Texas Theatre, where director Jamieson was in attendance to answer questions. On October 30, 2010, the film was screened by Lions Clubs International at Victoria, British Columbia. Kwan attended the screening, where Jo-Ann Roberts of CBC Radio One facilitated a question-and-answer session with her. The Chinese American Museum screened both the documentary and The World of Suzie Wong at the AMC Monterey Park on May 22, 2011.

American Film Institute screened the film at Grauman's Egyptian Theatre on August 11, 2011, and showed the Flower Drum Song to commemorate the 50th anniversary of Kwan's catapult to stardom. Kwan attended the screening and answered questions posed to her by the audience. To Whom It May Concern is being screened in the United States and international film festivals. In October 2011, the film was screened at the San Diego Asian Film Festival.

=== Accolades ===
To Whom It May Concern received the awards for "Best Feature Documentary" and "Best Director" at the American International Film Festival. At the WorldFest-Houston International Film Festival, it was awarded "Best Feature Documentary".
