= Richard Mason (novelist, born 1919) =

British novelist (1919–1997)

Richard Mason (16 May 1919 – 13 October 1997), published also under the pen name Richard Lakin, was a British novelist best known for his 1957 publication The World of Suzie Wong. His novels usually concerned Britons' experiences in exotic foreign locations, especially in Asia.

== Personal life ==
Born into a middle-class family in Hale, near Manchester, he attended The Downs Malvern, a private boarding school, from September 1928 to 1933. There he was taught by novelist W. H. Auden, and at the age of 14 wrote a juvenile novel (criticised by Auden as "no good" and now lost). A passage in his second novel, The Wind Cannot Read (1946), may shed some light on Auden's critique: "When I was a boy at school I had written a story about a man and a woman. The English master was a poet with a great understanding of human nature, and in red ink at the end he had written, 'Yes, my dear, but people do not fall in love as quickly as all that, you know.' I think my characters had declared their mutual love at a second meeting." His later novels allude to school bullying, and a fictional character mentions a painful separation from his mother, instances that may give some flavour of his own experience of boarding school. (The Downs Malvern, where he was a pupil from the age of nine, is a considerable distance from Hale.)

He later attended St Marys School and Bryanston School (1933–36) in Dorset, and published articles in the local press and a film magazine between 1933 and 1938. After working for the British Council, he served in the Royal Air Force from 1939 until 1944. Attached to the 14th Army as an intelligence officer, he was taught Japanese in a three-month crash course taken in India, to interrogate prisoners of war in India and Burma. (The course was taken with life-long friend Islay Lyons, a Welsh photographer.) In The Wind Cannot Read, the Michael Quinn character receives this training in flats overlooking the harbour of Mumbai, where the 14th Army was indeed stationed. More RAF-related experiences found fictional expression in his first, pseudonymous novel, The Body Fell on Berlin (1943), written as Richard Lakin (Lakin appears as his middle name in the German edition of The World of Suzie Wong).

In 1948, he eloped with and married the writer and public relations officer Anne Cumming, who had previously been married to Henry Lyon Young. Cumming was notorious as a sexual free spirit, who was best known in avant garde literary circles. The two travelled through most of the countries of Europe, and logged 8,000 miles of travel in Africa in a second-hand car. They separated in 1958 and were later divorced.

In the 1960s, he restored an apartment in Rome and then went on to raise sheep on an estate in Wales with his second wife, Sarett Rudley, a television mystery writer best known for a number of Alfred Hitchcock Presents teleplays. He was to remain close friends with both ex-wives.

In the early 1970s, Mason returned to Rome, where he met his third wife Margot ("Maggie") Wolf in 1972, with whom he had a son, Theo, and a daughter, Jessica. The couple were popular hosts, and Mason worked on his sculpting from a rooftop workshop and garden. "After Suzie, the ideas just wouldn't come. The book has been good for us, like an inheritance, really. We’re not rich, but we live comfortably", Mason remarked in a 1988 interview.

Long a cigarette smoker, he died of head and neck/lung cancer, in Rome. He is interred in the Protestant Cemetery, Rome (near Percy Shelley), where his headstone is inscribed with the words "Though on the sign it is written: 'Don't pluck these blossoms'—it is useless against the wind, which cannot read". (This poem, quoted in Basil Chamberlain's A Handbook of Colloquial Japanese also prefaces The Wind Cannot Read).

== Career ==
Mason's first novel, The Body Fell on Berlin, was a murder mystery set during the war. Jasper Doyle, an intelligence officer formerly of Scotland Yard, is posted to Fenmallham Airdrome, England, from which RAF bombers depart for missions over occupied Europe and Germany. In reviewing some photos taking during a bombing run over Berlin he spots what looks suspiciously like a body - which seems to have been very neatly disposed of indeed . . . . The setting is keenly observed, as are the many convincing characters.

His second novel, The Wind Cannot Read, was written in India between February and May 1944, sometimes in temperatures over 100 degrees, after the day's duties. It was based partly on his wartime experiences learning Japanese and won the John Llewellyn Rhys Prize in 1948. (The character "Peter" featured in it was based on his friend Lyons, while the Michael Quinn character is transparently himself.) Mason also did a surprisingly competent job of writing the screenplay for the 1958 film version, starring Dirk Bogarde. Many of the themes of love transcending cultural boundaries, also developed later in The World of Suzie Wong, make their first appearance here. The movie setting, Red Fort in Delhi, departs from the Mumbai setting of the novel, but provides visual interest, and complements the novel by providing a rich portrait of the city and of Indian life. The novel and film were sufficiently successful that Mason was subsequently able to devote himself entirely to writing and travel, including visits to the Caribbean and Polynesia.

The Wind Cannot Read was followed by another mystery novel Angel Take Care (also written as Richard Lakin, 1947). Easily the most charming of Mason's novels, it details the amusing experiences of a newly-formed husband and wife detective team as they attempt to determine the fate of a missing person.

Mason's next novel The Shadow and the Peak, set in Jamaica, was filmed in 1958 as Passionate Summer (alternately titled "Storm over Jamaica"). In this time frame Mason also produced films and wrote several scripts. With W. P. Lipscomb, he wrote the screenplay for the 1956 film version of Nevil Shute's novel A Town Like Alice.

In search of inspiration for his next book, he suspected that he would find it in Hong Kong. "I had felt I needed background for a book and something in me said Hong Kong was a place where I would immediately find material, so I simply bought a ticket," he commented to an interviewer. Mason's delight in his observations there did indeed inspire him to write his best-known book, The World of Suzie Wong (1957), a tale of an artist's surprisingly tender romance with a Hong Kong prostitute. It quickly became a well-reviewed bestseller, The Times Literary Supplement, for example, calling it "extremely readable" and noting that it was "written with uncommon skill and intelligence." It also added a somewhat controversial expression, "Suzie Wong" (a seductive East Asian woman), to the English language. It was quickly adapted into a 1958 Broadway play, starring William Shatner and France Nuyen, as well as the 1960 film The World of Suzie Wong, starring William Holden and Nancy Kwan. It was Kwan's first film role.

Mason wrote the first draft of the novel in Hong Kong in three months in 1956, but upon returning to England he felt he had been too close to the material to judge it properly and put the manuscript away in a cabinet. Setting this draft behind him, he rewrote the entire novel from scratch over the course of a year.

The primary setting is a hotel brothel called Nam Kok, based on the actual Luk Kwok hotel where Mason himself stayed. (The hotel has since been replaced by an upscale concrete and glass construction that bears no resemblance.) The novel's success owes much to psychological insight, a strength apparent in all of Mason's novels, deft and often touching characterisation, and a love story that explores the difficulties inherent in a relationship between a respectable British artist and a Hong Kong prostitute, forced into the trade from economic necessity. (China had been embroiled in a turbulent civil war compounded by Japanese invasion in the period immediately preceding the events of the novel.) The psychological pressures bearing upon the essentially conservative Suzie, and the social consequences for her lover Robert Lomax, are particularly well developed. Mason, however, felt that the novel fell short of its potential and would have been stronger had he explored more fully life as it was then being lived in Hong Kong.

The film differs significantly from the novel in a number of ways (Lomax, for example, is transformed into an American, a major character is omitted altogether, and Suzie's travails with the legal system and health make no appearance). However, filmed on location, it is full of visual interest. Mason himself thought well of the film except for the performance of Holden, who he felt was nothing like Lomax, and "more like an American banker".

Mason's 1962 espionage novel The Fever Tree was set in India and Nepal. Written in 1961 with the help of Sarett, while working in creative isolation on Elba, it was to be his last. From this point forward he lived entirely on royalties earned from his publications and films and spent time learning sculpting from the Rome-based artist Robert Cook.

== Bibliography ==
=== Fiction ===
- The Body Fell on Berlin, Hodder & Stoughton, London 1943 (as Richard Lakin)
- The Wind Cannot Read, Hodder & Stoughton, London 1946; screenplay 1958
- Angel Take Care, 1947 (as Richard Lakin)
- The Shadow and the Peak, Hodder & Stoughton, London 1949, film 1958
- The World of Suzie Wong, Collins, London 1957
- The Fever Tree, Collins, London 1962
