= Brian Jamieson (director) =

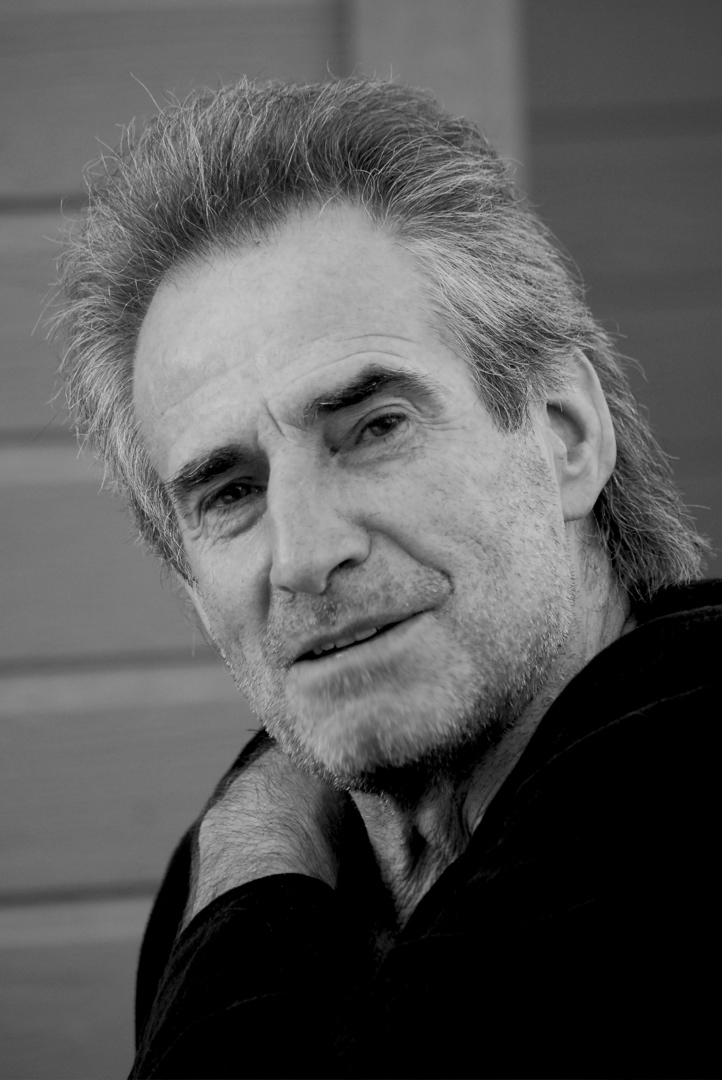
- Jamieson in 2009
- Occupations: Film director, producer, studio executive
- Known for: To Whom It May Concern: Ka Shen's Journey

Brian Jamieson is a director, producer, and studio executive.

== Career ==
Jamieson is from New Zealand.

Jamieson first entered the film industry with the New Zealand branch of Warner Bros. in 1977. He was later transferred to the United Kingdom. After his success publicizing Steven Spielberg's Close Encounters of the Third Kind and Peter Yates' The Deep, he was named the International Publicist of the Year.

He moved to the United States in 1984. During the 1980s, he was in charge of all the company's theatrical marketing in Latin America, the Far East, South Africa, Europe, Australia and New Zealand; he was later promoted to head of International Marketing and Publicity, which made him responsible for home video marketing internationally. He also collaborated with Stanley Kubrick to promote Full Metal Jacket; they continued to work together until Eyes Wide Shut, Kubrick's last film before his death in 1999.

The Times Colonist called Jamieson a "respected film preservationist". In his work at Warner Home Video, Jamieson shepherded the restorations of numerous classical films. In 2002, Jamieson helped produce Charlie: The Life and Art of Charles Chaplin, with Richard Schickel, which was shown at the 2003 Cannes Film Festival. Two years later, he collaborated with Schickel to reconstruct The Big Red One, by Sam Fuller. The two readded 47 minutes of previously cut material. The reconstruction won several awards, including the Seattle Film Critics Awards and the Los Angeles Film Critics Association Awards. He later released a reconstruction of Sam Peckinpah's 1969 film The Wild Bunch.

By March 2006 he had opened his own production agency, Redwind Productions, and in 2007 released the company's first production, Cannes All Access, a look at the social impact of the Cannes Film Festival.

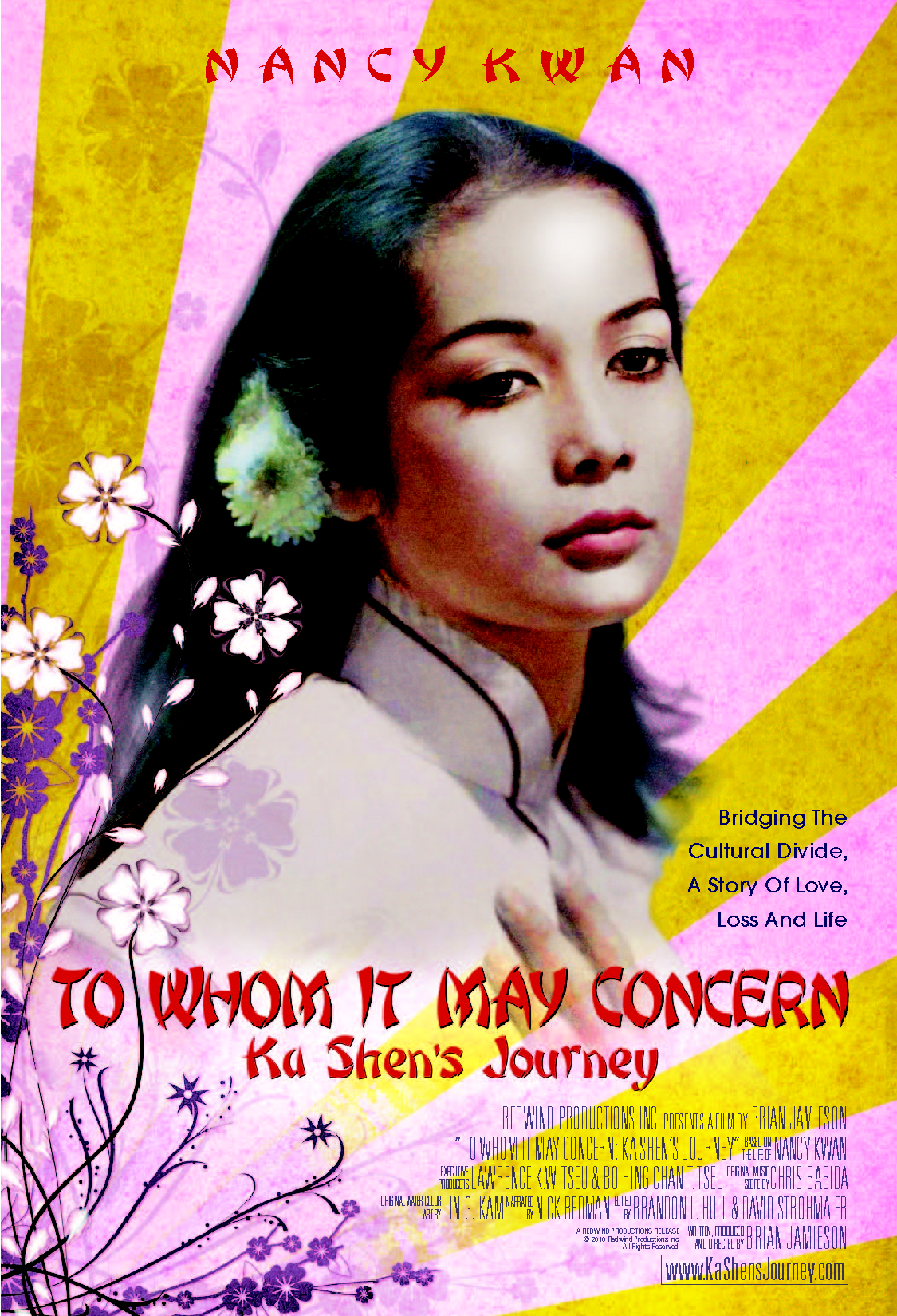
To Whom It May Concern was Jamieson's directorial debut

In 2010 he made his directorial debut with To Whom It May Concern: Ka Shen's Journey, which tells how Nancy Kwan ensured that Asians could play Asian characters with her success in 1960's The World of Suzie Wong. The film received several awards, including the Women's International Film and Television Showcase (WIFTS) Diversity Award, as well as the Best Feature Documentary from both the American International Film Festival (AIFF) and the WorldFest-Houston International Film Festival. Jamieson himself received the Best Director award from the AIFF.

== Cinema history ==
According to the WIFTS Foundation, Jamieson was one of the first directors to include documentaries with home video releases of classic movies as a way to promote "cinema literacy". He later established Twilight Time with Nick Redman, which serves to release limited runs of classic movies not yet on DVD. As of August 2011, the label has already released Michael Curtiz's 1954 film The Egyptian, with plans to release Cy Endfield 1961 film Mysterious Island and Tom Holland's 1985 film Fright Night by the end of the year. Jamieson notes that it is a "win-win" project, with film lovers getting access to rare classic movies and studios able to release and profit from undervalued productions without financial investment.
