= The Main Attraction (film) =

1962 British film by Daniel Petrie

- 1961 theatrical poster
- Directed by: Daniel Petrie
- Written by: John Patrick
- Produced by: John Patrick
- Starring: Pat Boone; Nancy Kwan
- Cinematography: Geoffrey Unsworth
- Edited by: Geoffrey Foot
- Music by: Andrew Adorian
- Production company: Seven Arts Productions
- Distributed by: Metro-Goldwyn-Mayer Inc.
- Release date: January 1963
- Running time: 85 minutes
- Countries: United Kingdom; United States
- Language: English
- Budget: over $1 million

The Main Attraction is a 1962 British-American drama film directed by Daniel Petrie, and starring Pat Boone, Nancy Kwan and Mai Zetterling. It was written by John Patrick. The music soundtrack was written by Boone and Jeff Corey and performed by Boone. A young drifter causes problems for a small European circus.

== Plot ==
Eddie is a singing drifter who wants to travel around the world. He works in an Italian café, but is fired when he gets into a brawl with a drunken customer. At the same time he meets Gina a ventriloquist in a visiting circus. Soon enough Eddie helps Gina out with her act and they become lovers. All is well until Eddie moves on, falling in love with another circus performer, Tessa; this is complicated by the jealousy of Gina's ex-husband, Bozo.

Eddie runs off after a fight, fearing he has killed Bozo, but runs into Tessa on a bus. They return to the circus.

== Cast ==
- Pat Boone as Eddie
- Nancy Kwan as Tessa
- Mai Zetterling as Gina
- Yvonne Mitchell as Elenora Moreno
- Kieron Moore as Ricco Moreno
- John Le Mesurier as Bozo

== Production ==
The film was the first in a multi-picture deal between MGM and Seven Arts.

Pat Boone says he was talked into doing the film by Ray Stark who encouraged Boone to try a straight dramatic role. Boone agreed because Hollywood was making fewer musicals at the time. He also felt that "the film's moral is good." "I want to develop as an entertainer and also an actor", he said. "I realise I can't always be an ex teenager... I want to take on anything that a guy my age would be called up on to do in the movies with one exception: it must be family entertainment. I wouldn't want to make a picture that I wouldn't permit my children to see."

The film was originally called Maria.

Stark and writer-producer John Patrick wanted Boone's character to sleep with Nancy Kwan's. Boone was reluctant and refused to shoot a scene with them in bed together. However, as he did not have script approval he filmed scenes which indicated his character slept with Kwan's.

=== Filming ===
Filming started February 5, 1962. There were seven weeks of studio filming in London, followed by three weeks location work in Tuscany, Italy. In order to play his role, Boone learned how to play the guitar and do basic trapeze tricks.

After filming was completed, Boone said he would oppose release of the film unless it was given approval by the US censor, the Shurlock office. Boone was worried some scenes had been re-shot to be more lurid and sexy – something Ray Stark denied. "There have been no changes at all in the film", said Stark. "It is exactly the same film that Pat Boone saw when he attended its world premiere in London some weeks ago."

"I am terribly concerned about the board's reaction to certain scenes", said Boone. "Because as long as I have anything to do with it, no Pat Boone picture will ever be released without a seal of approval."

Boone offered to reshoot any objectionable scenes, even do the whole movie over again without pay.

Seven Arts compromised and agreed to cut some scenes in exchange for Boone going on a publicity tour for the movie.

== Reception ==
The Monthly Film Bulletin wrote: "Only a richly flamboyant production could do justice to the extravagance of the plot. But the film as a whole is as timid as Pat Boone's attempt to be bold and bad – although the latter spectacle has a kind of freakish interest, as if Snow White had decided to behave like the wicked Queen. Even the circus setting – the last resort of the unimaginative film-maker – lacks its customary vitality. However, Mai Zetterling has a few moments of drunken splendour which are bloodshot beacons of light in an otherwise dimly soppy little film.

According to Diabolique magazine "it's a weird film, not quite successful, but interesting which benefits from being shot in Europe. And there is a catchy theme tune. The public didn’t particularly like it. Pat Boone said it was because it was too sexy for something starring him, and he's probably right. It was a role that needed an Elvis."

Leonard Maltin said: "Boone is fatally out of his depth..."
