= The World of Suzie Wong (film) =

1960 drama film directed by Richard Quine

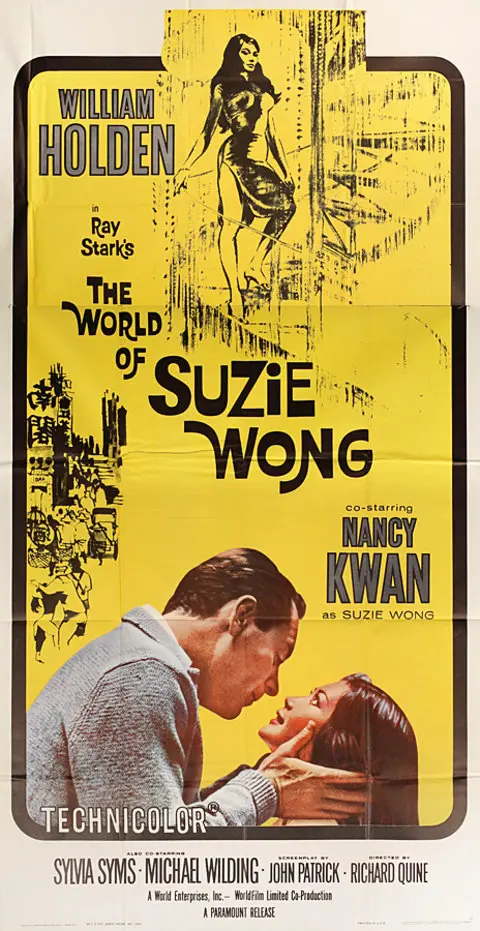
- Original poster
- Directed by: Richard Quine
- Written by: John Patrick; Based on the play by Paul Osborn
- Produced by: Ray Stark
- Starring: William Holden; Nancy Kwan; Sylvia Syms; Michael Wilding
- Cinematography: Geoffrey Unsworth
- Edited by: Bert Bates
- Music by: George Duning
- Production companies: World Enterprises, Inc. Worldfilm, Ltd; Paramount British Pictures, Ltd
- Distributed by: Paramount Pictures
- Release date: November 10, 1960 (US)
- Running time: 126 minutes
- Countries: United Kingdom; United States
- Language: English
- Budget: $2,000,000
- Box office: $7,300,000 (US and Canada)

The World of Suzie Wong is a 1960 British-American romantic drama film directed by Richard Quine and starring William Holden and Nancy Kwan. The screenplay by John Patrick was adapted from the 1958 stage play by Paul Osborn, which was based on the 1957 novel of the same title by Richard Mason.

== Plot ==
American architect Robert Lomax (William Holden) is living in Hong Kong for a year to try and make a living as an artist. While aboard a ferry, he meets Mi-Ling (Nancy Kwan), a smartly dressed young woman who claims her father is wealthy. When the ferry docks, they part ways.

Robert looks for an inexpensive living place in Wan Chai, a poor area known for prostitution. By chance, he sees Mi-Ling leaving the run-down Nam Kok Hotel. When he inquires inside, the hotel owner replies that he does not know any Mi-Ling, but he and Robert negotiate a monthly room rate. At the bar adjoining the hotel, Robert sees Mi-Ling dressed in a slinky red cheongsam and with a sailor. He learns her real name is Suzie Wong, and she is the bar's most popular girl.

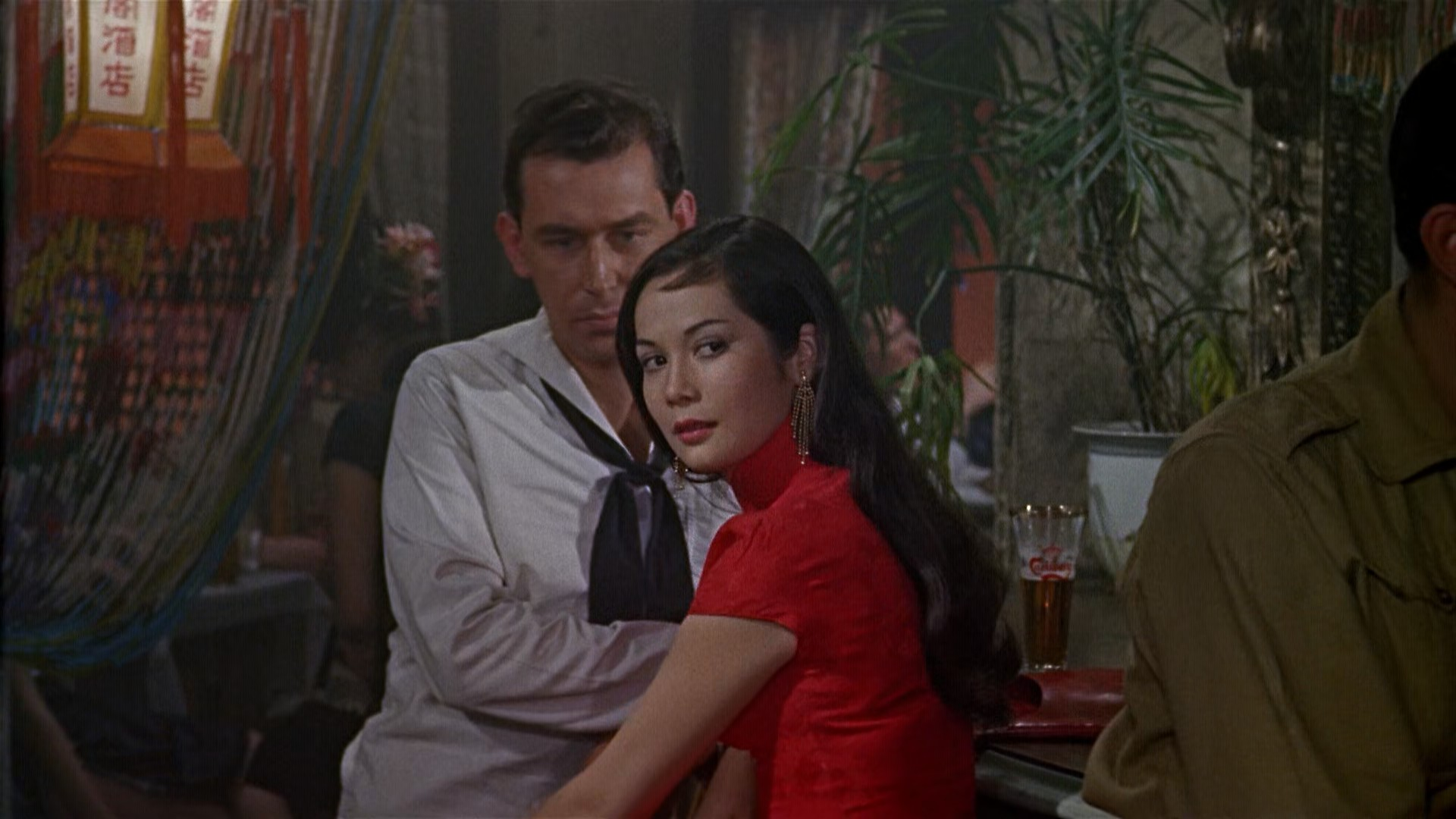
Suzie Wong with a sailor (screenshot from trailer)

The following day, Robert visits a Western bank and sets up an account with banker Mr. O'Neill, who also provides him letters of introduction. His secretary and daughter, Kay (Sylvia Syms), is immediately attracted to Robert.

Robert hires Suzie to pose for him. He eventually learns that she was forced into prostitution after being abandoned when she was ten. Suzie begins falling in love with Robert, but he dissuades her, though he keeps her as his muse. Meanwhile, Kay discreetly pursues Robert. One night after a party at Kay's house, Robert invites her to see his paintings but is embarrassed to find Suzie on his bed. After Kay departs, Robert orders Suzie out. As she is leaving, a sailor whom she spurned earlier that evening beats her in the stairwell. Enraged, Robert punches the sailor.

Suzie accepts her client Ben's (Michael Wilding) offer to be his mistress to make Robert jealous. When Ben reconciles with his wife, he asks Robert to tell Suzie the news. She is so hurt by the rejection that Robert finally admits he loves her and asks her to stay with him.

Soon the couple is living together in the hotel, with Robert painting more enthusiastically than ever. Curious about Suzie's daily absences, he follows her up a hillside path to a small house. He finds Suzie visiting her baby son, whom she has kept secret. Robert accepts the child.

Robert faces financial difficulties when his paintings fail to sell. Both Kay and Suzie offer him money, but he refuses. When Suzie pays his rent and wants to resume working as a prostitute to help him, he angrily drives her away. Robert quickly regrets his actions and spends days searching for Suzie. Meanwhile, Kay informs Robert that a portrait of Suzie has sold in London. Robert reveals that he has lost Suzie. Kay, misunderstanding, says he can find another model; she romantically pursues Robert but he rebuffs her.

Robert finds Suzie waiting outside the hotel. She asks for his help to retrieve her son, who is in danger due to the heavy rains. Robert and Suzie force their way up the hillside house, but the baby has been killed by a landslide. After the funereal temple ceremony for her son, Robert asks Suzie to marry him. She agrees.

== Cast ==
- William Holden as Robert Lomax
- Nancy Kwan as Suzie Wong
- Sylvia Syms as Kay O'Neill
- Michael Wilding as Ben Marlowe
- Laurence Naismith as O'Neill
- Andy Ho as Ah Tong
- Jacqui Chan as Gwennie Lee
- Yvonne Shima as Minnie Ho

== Production ==
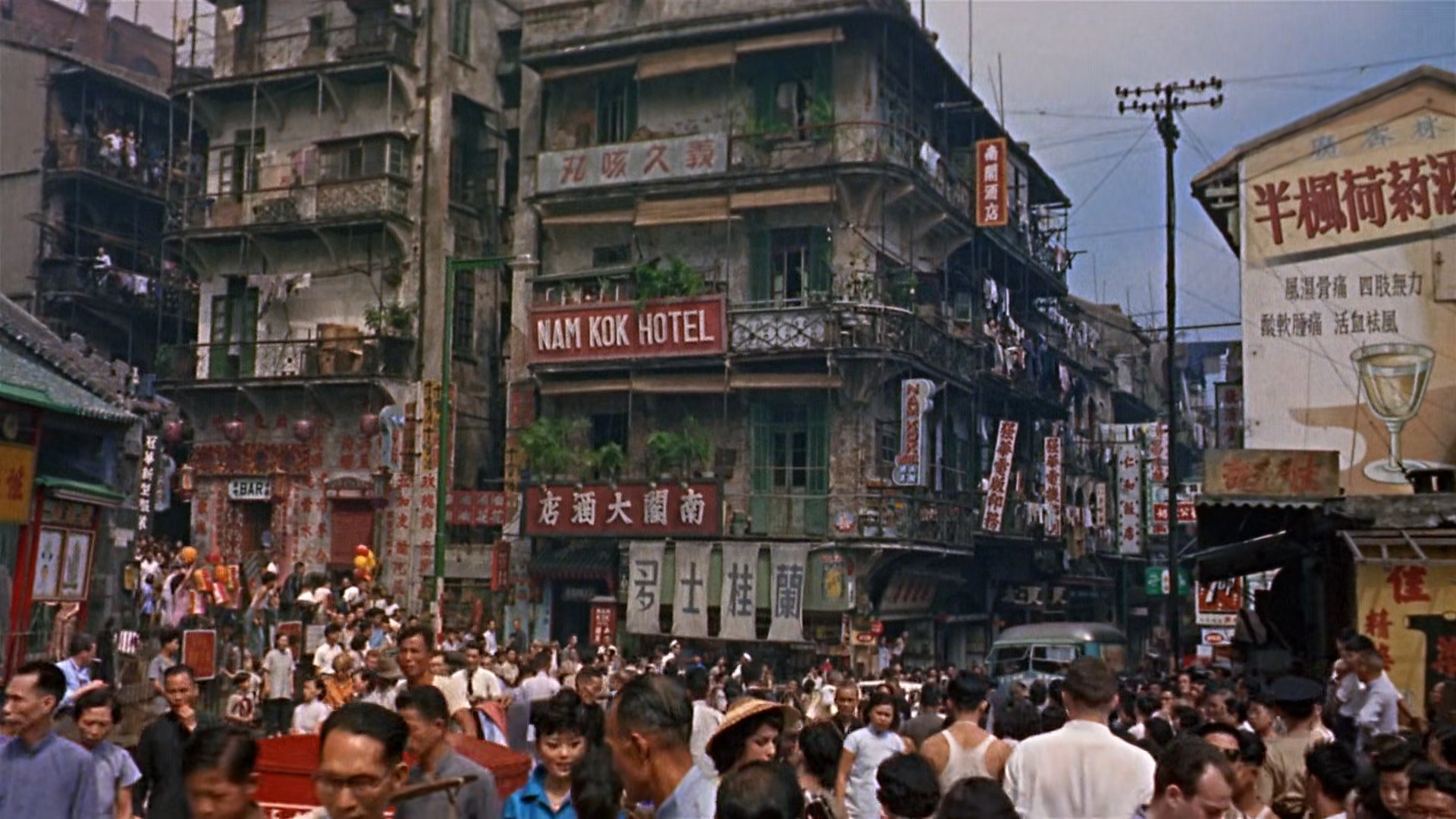
The film featured many scenes filmed in Hong Kong. Here, a screenshot of the film's trailer shows the fictional Nam Kok Hotel (Chinese: 南國大酒店; Jyutping: naam4 gwok3 daai6 zau2 dim3) (inspired by the 1950s Hong Kong's Luk Kwok Hotel) in Sheung Wan, Hong Kong. Shot location: 22.284156°N 114.150208°E

France Nuyen, who had played the role of Suzie Wong in the Broadway production opposite William Shatner and was familiar to film audiences from her appearance in South Pacific, originally signed to reprise the role on screen. After five weeks of location shooting in Hong Kong, the cast and crew – including original director Jean Negulesco – moved to London to film interiors.

Nuyen was romantically involved with Marlon Brando, and rumors of his affair with Barbara Luna was causing her distress. She began overeating, and before long was unable to fit into the body-hugging silk cheongsams her character was required to wear. Unwilling to halt production until she could lose enough weight for the production's requirements, executive producer Ray Stark replaced her with Nancy Kwan, who was touring the United States and Canada as the understudy to the lead in the road company performing the play. Stark had auditioned her for the film but had felt that she was too inexperienced to handle the lead.

Stark also fired the director, Negulesco, and replaced him with Richard Quine. Everyone involved in the completed Hong Kong scenes was required to return to reshoot them with Kwan, and all the unpublished publicity with Nuyen, including an article and photo layout for Esquire, had to be redone.

The film's title song was written by Sammy Cahn and Jimmy Van Heusen. Artist Dong Kingman acted as the film's technical advisor and painted sets for the film. The movie features location filming in Hong Kong, and art direction and production design by John Box, Syd Cain, Liz Moore, Roy Rossotti and R. L. M. Davidson at MGM British Studios.

Sylvia Syms had just made Ferry to Hong Kong in Hong Kong.

The film premiered at Radio City Music Hall in New York City.

== Locations ==
Although set in Wanchai, the film featured locations from around Hong Kong, sometimes misrepresenting their geographical proximity for cinematic effect. The film serves as a valuable historical record of 1960s Hong Kong. Locations seen in the film include Tsim Sha Tsui, Central/Sheung Wan (especially around Ladder Street), Yau Ma Tei, Sai Ying Pun, Aberdeen and Telegraph Bay.

== Critical reception and reputation ==
On Rotten Tomatoes, the film has an approval rating of 38% based on eight reviews, with an average rating of 5.75 out of 10.

When the film was released it attracted a mixed response. Bosley Crowther of The New York Times observed that sceptics could assume "that what we have here is a tale so purely idealized in the telling that it wafts into the realm of sheer romance. But the point is that idealization is accomplished so unrestrainedly and with such open reliance upon the impact of elemental clichés that it almost builds up the persuasiveness of real sincerity. Unless you shut your eyes and start thinking, you might almost believe it to be true." He added, "Mr. Patrick's screenplay contrives such a winning yum-yum girl that, even if she is invented, she's a charming little thing to have around . . . And a new girl named Nancy Kwan plays her so blithely and innocently that even the ladies should love her. She and the scenery are the best things in the film."

Variety said, "Holden gives a first-class performance, restrained and sincere. He brings authority and compassion to the role. Kwan is not always perfect in her timing of lines (she has a tendency to anticipate) and appears to lack a full range of depth or warmth, but on the whole she manages a fairly believable portrayal."

Some years after the film's release, the London listing magazine Time Out commented that because the film is "denied the chance of being honest about its subject, it soon degenerates into euphemistic soap opera, with vague gestures towards bohemianism and lukewarm titillation."

In 2013, the Japanese American Citizens League called out Katy Perry's geisha-styled performance on the American Music Awards, as "the latest rendition of the bad movie we've all seen before. There is a persistent strain in our culture that refuses to move beyond the stereotype of Asian women as exotic and subservient. These stereotypes have been reinforced in our popular culture through plays and movies from our distant past such as Madame Butterfly and The World of Suzie Wong."

== Box office ==
The film was regarded as a "money maker" at the British box office in 1961.

== Awards and nominations ==
Nancy Kwan was nominated for the Golden Globe Award for Best Actress – Motion Picture Drama but lost to Greer Garson in Sunrise at Campobello. George Duning was nominated for the Golden Globe Award for Best Original Score but lost to Dimitri Tiomkin for The Alamo.

== Home media ==
The film was released on Region 1 DVD on June 29, 2004. It is in anamorphic widescreen format with an audio track and subtitles in English.

== See also ==
- List of American films of 1960
