= Nancy Kwan =

Chinese-American actress (born 1939)

- 關家蒨
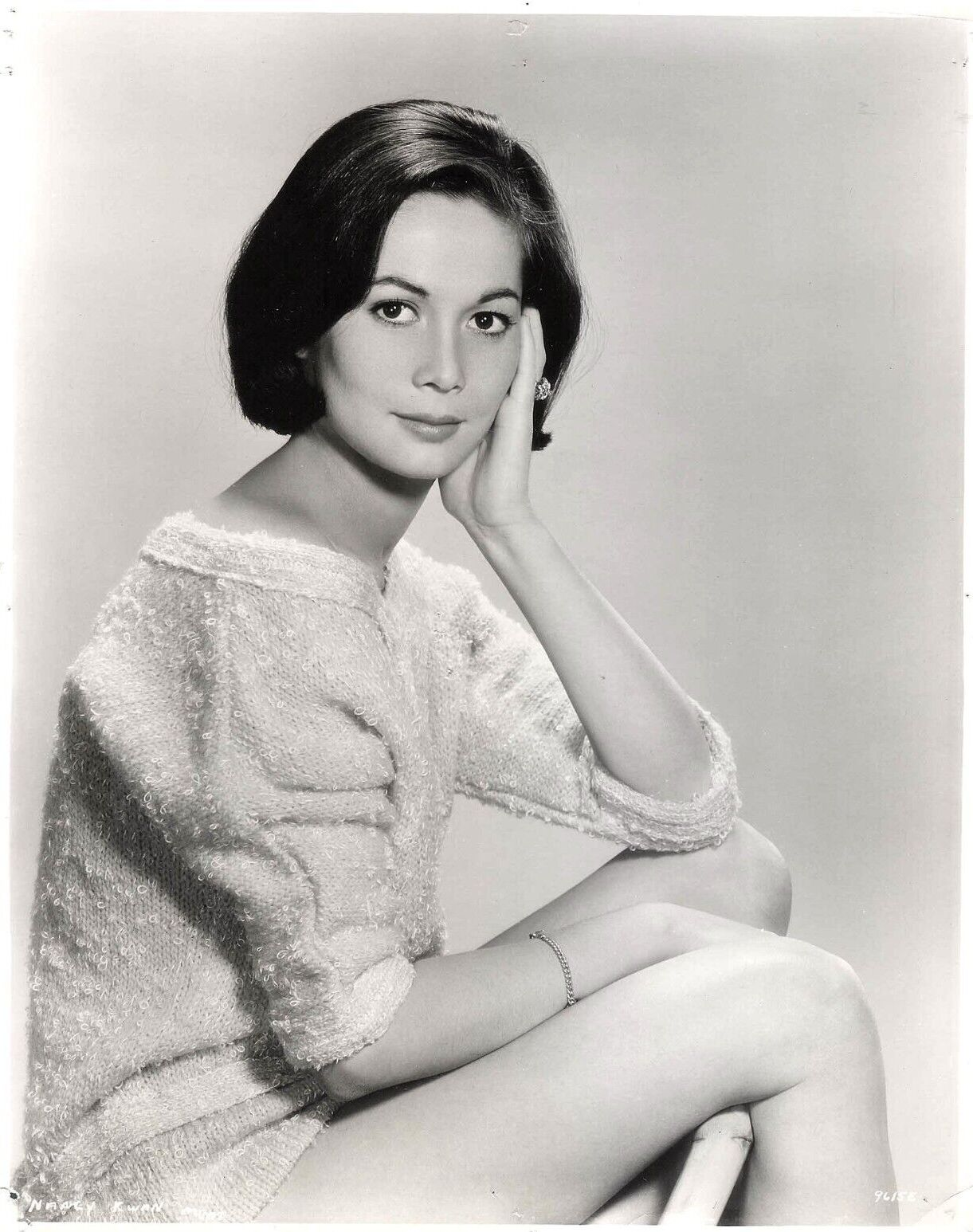
- Kwan in 1964
- Born: May 19, 1939 (age 87); British Hong Kong
- Education: Maryknoll Convent School; Royal Ballet School
- Occupations: Actress; Restaurateur
- Years active: 1960–present
- Known for: Flower Drum Song; The World of Suzie Wong; Fate Is the Hunter; The Wild Affair
- Spouses: Peter Pock (m. 1962; div. 1968); David Giler (m. 1970; div. 1972); Norbert Meisel (m. 1976)
- Children: Bernhard Pock (1963–1996)
- Relatives: Loke Yew (great-grandfather)

Chinese name
- Traditional Chinese: 關家蒨
- Simplified Chinese: 关家蒨
Transcriptions
Standard Mandarin
- Hanyu Pinyin: Guān Jiāqiàn
- Wade–Giles: Kuan Chia-ch'ien
Yue: Cantonese
- Jyutping: Gwaan1 Gaa1sin6
Southern Min
- Hokkien POJ: Kwan Ka Shen
- Website: nancy-kwan.com

Nancy Kwan Ka-shen (Chinese: 關家蒨; Jyutping: Gwaan1 Gaa1sin6; born May 19, 1939) is a Chinese-American actress whose career included more than fifty English language film and television roles. Kwan's career coincided with Hollywood's casting of more Asian roles in the 1960s, and she became an Eastern sex symbol in the 1960s.

== Biography ==
=== Early life ===
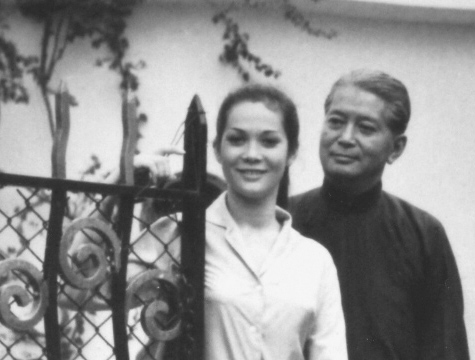
Nancy Kwan and her father, Kwan Wing-hong, 1956

Kwan was born in Hong Kong on May 19, 1939, and grew up in Kowloon Tong district. Kwan's father was Kwan Wing-hong, a Cantonese architect and her mother was Marquita Scott, a White British model of English and Scottish ancestry. (Note: Nancy Kwan is "half-Chinese, three-eighths English, one-eighth Scot, blended with a touch of Malayan".) Kwan Wing-hong was the son of lawyer Kwan King-sun and Juliann Loke Yuen-ying, daughter of business executive Loke Yew. He attended Cambridge University and met Scott in London. The two married and moved to Hong Kong, where Wing-hong became a prominent architect. In that era, interracial marriage was not widely accepted. Nancy has an older brother, Ka-keung.

In 1941, Kwan's parents divorced when she was two years old. Scott escaped to England during the World War II Japanese invasion and never rejoined the family. She later moved to New York and married an American.

At Christmas 1941, in fear of the Japanese invasion of Hong Kong during World War II, Wing Hong, in the guise of a coolie, escaped from Hong Kong to North China with his two children, whom he hid in wicker baskets. Kwan and her brother were transported by servants, evading Japanese sentries. They remained in exile in western China for five years until the war ended, after which they returned to Hong Kong and lived in a spacious, contemporary home her father had designed. Remaining in Hong Kong with the children, her father married a Chinese woman, whom Kwan called "Mother". Her father and stepmother raised her, in addition to her brother and five half-brothers and half-sisters. Five of Kwan's siblings became lawyers.

All of my brothers and sisters are lawyers. The whole family. So I'm the black sheep. – Nancy Kwan

Except during World War II, Kwan had a comfortable early life. Cared for by an amah (阿嬤), a woman who looks after children, Kwan owned a pony and spent her summers in resorts in Borneo, Macao, and Japan. An affluent man, her father owned a several-acre hilltop property in Kowloon. In her youth, she was called "Ka-shen". She wrote in 1960 that as an eight-year-old, her fortune-teller "predicted travel, fame, and fortune for me". (Note: In 1959, the same fortune teller prophesied that Kwan would assume the lead role in the film The World of Suzie Wong. The first prophecy was fulfilled when Kwan traveled to Toronto to play the female lead Suzie. The second prophecy was fulfilled when the chosen actress was disqualified, after which producer Ray Stark asked her to screen test for the role, which he later gave her. In an interview with The Saturday Evening Post's Pete Martin, published on February 10, 1962, Kwan said that the story was a hoax. She explained, "Never believe those biographies about me. Many writers put things into them to make people read them.")

Kwan attended the Catholic Maryknoll Convent School until she was 13 years old, after which she travelled to Kingsmoor School in Glossop, England a private boarding school that had offered places to refugees in 1938 and 1939, either at no cost or at a reduced rate, that her brother Ka-keung was then attending. Her brother studied to become an architect and she studied to become a dancer.

Kwan's introduction to tai chi sparked a desire to learn ballet. When Kwan was 18, she pursued her dream of becoming a ballet dancer by attending the Royal Ballet School in London. She studied performing arts subjects such as stage make-up and danced every day for four hours. Her studies at the Royal Ballet School ran concurrently with her high-school studies. Because Kwan's high school had deep connections with nearby theatre companies, Kwan was able to take small parts in several of their productions. (Note: Kwan served as a "spear carrier" during an Aida opera performance. She performed in the ballet company's Swan Lake and Sleeping Beauty performances.) Upon graduating from high school, she took a luxurious trip to France, Italy, and Switzerland. Afterwards, she traveled back to Hong Kong, where she started a ballet school.

=== Early career ===
Stage producer Ray Stark posted an advertisement in the Hong Kong Tiger Standard (later renamed The Standard) regarding auditions for the character Suzie Wong for a play. The ad asked applicants to present their pictures, résumés, and proportions. Kwan submitted her application and actually met Stark in a film studio that her father had constructed. After auditioning for Stark, she was asked to screen test to play a character in the then-upcoming film The World of Suzie Wong. Stark preferred Kwan over the other applicants because she "would have more universal acceptance". Another applicant, French actress France Nuyen, played the stage version of the role and had been called a "businessman's delight" by a number of reviewers. Stark disliked this characterization, as well as "happy harlot" characters such as Melina Mercouri in Never on Sunday. Stark wanted an Asian actress because reshaping the eyes of a white actress wouldn't look authentic. He also praised Kwan's features: an "acceptable face" and "being alluringly leggy [and] perfectly formed".

For each screen test, Kwan, accompanied by her younger sister, was chauffeured to the studio by her father's driver. Stark characterized Kwan's first screen test as "pretty dreadful" but one that hinted at her potential. After four weeks of training with drama teachers, including hours of lessons with Pulitzer Prize–winning playwright–screenwriter John Patrick, Kwan's second screen test was a significant improvement.

Although she had not yet become an actress, Stark said, there was a "development of her authority". Once, upon viewing her screen test, Kwan said, "I'm a terrible girl" and "squealed with embarrassment"; acting as a prostitute was a vastly different experience from her comfortable life in Hong Kong. The reaction prompted Stark to forbid her from viewing the dailies. Kwan did a third screen test after four months had passed, and the producers couldn't decide whether to choose Kwan or Nuyen.

Owing to Kwan's lack of acting experience, at Stark's request she travelled to the United States, where she attended acting school in Hollywood and resided at the Hollywood Studio Club, a chaperoned dormitory with other apprentices actresses. She later moved to New York. Kwan signed a seven-year contract with Stark's Seven Arts Productions at a starting salary of $300 a week, even though she was not given one, or any particular role. In 2005, Edward S. Feldman and Tom Barton characterized Kwan's wages and her employment as "indentured servitude". In a retrospective interview, Kwan told Goldsea that she had no prior acting experience and that the $300 a week salary was "a lot of money to me then".

When The World of Suzie Wong began to tour, Kwan was assigned the part of a bargirl. In addition to her small supporting character role, Kwan became an understudy for the production's female lead, France Nuyen. Though Stark and the male lead William Holden preferred Kwan despite her somewhat apprehensive demeanor during the screen test, she did not get the role. Paramount favored the more accomplished France Nuyen, who had been widely praised for her performance in the film South Pacific (1958). Stark acquiesced to Paramount's wishes. Nuyen received the role and Kwan later took Nuyen's place on Broadway. In a September 1960 interview with Associated Press journalist Bob Thomas, she said, "I was bitterly disappointed, and I almost quit and went home when I didn't get the picture." Kwan did not receive the lead role because Stark believed she was too inexperienced at the time. Nuyen won the title role in the ensuing movie because of her powerful portrayal of Suzie Wong during the tour. She moved to England to film the movie, leaving an opening for Kwan to ascend to the lead female role in the touring production. In 1959, one month after Nuyen was selected for the film role and while Kwan was touring in Toronto, Stark told her to screen test again for the film. Kwan responded to his phone call from London, asking, "How can I come? I'm in this show." To provide a pretext for Kwan's sudden hiatus from the touring production, Stark sent a cablegram to her superiors saying her father had become ill and had been hospitalized. Kwan later recalled in an interview about three years later, "So I went to the manager and told him a lie. It was not very nice, but what could I do?" After Kwan accepted the role, the Broadway play producer sued her for leaving with little notice.

Nuyen, who was in an unstable relationship with Marlon Brando, had a nervous breakdown and was fired from the role because of her erratic behavior. (Note: The official reason Paramount Pictures gave for Nuyen's departure was that she had developed "a recurrence of a throat infection that developed into tonsillitis and laryngitis". Richard West of the Los Angeles Times wrote that the speculation was that Nuyen was removed owing to her then-recent weight gain because she binge ate after splitting up with Brando.) The film's director, Jean Negulesco, was fired and replaced by Richard Quine. Kwan, who had never previously been in a film, got the part by beating out over 30 actresses from Hollywood, France, Japan, Korea, and the Philippines. On February 15, 1960, she began filming the movie in London with co-star William Holden.

During the filming, Kwan's only trouble was a lingerie scene. Robert Lomax, as played by Holden, tears off her Western dress and says, "Wear your own kind of clothing! Don't try to copy some European girl!" Director Richard Quine was displeased with Kwan's underclothes: She wore a full-slip rather than a half-slip and bra. Finding the attire too modest and unrealistic, he asked Stark to talk to Kwan. Stark discovered Kwan taking refuge in her dressing room, sobbing hysterically . He warned her, "Nancy, wear the half-slip and bra or you're off the picture. France Nuyen is no longer in it, remember? If you're difficult you'll be off it too. All we want to do is make you the best actress possible." Kwan bashfully returned to the set after lunch having made the requested wardrobe changes and acting as if the events of the morning's shoot had never happened.

Owing to Kwan's evident Eurasian appearance, the film's make-up artists attempted to make her look more Chinese. They plucked her eyebrows and sketched a line across her forehead. In movies where Kwan plays Asian roles, the makeup artists reshaped her brown eyes. Gossip columnist Hedda Hopper wrote that Kwan, as a Eurasian, does not look fully Asian or European. Hopper wrote that the "scattering of freckles across her tip-tilted nose give her an Occidental flavor". The production spanned five months, an unusually lengthy shoot for that time.

=== Stardom ===
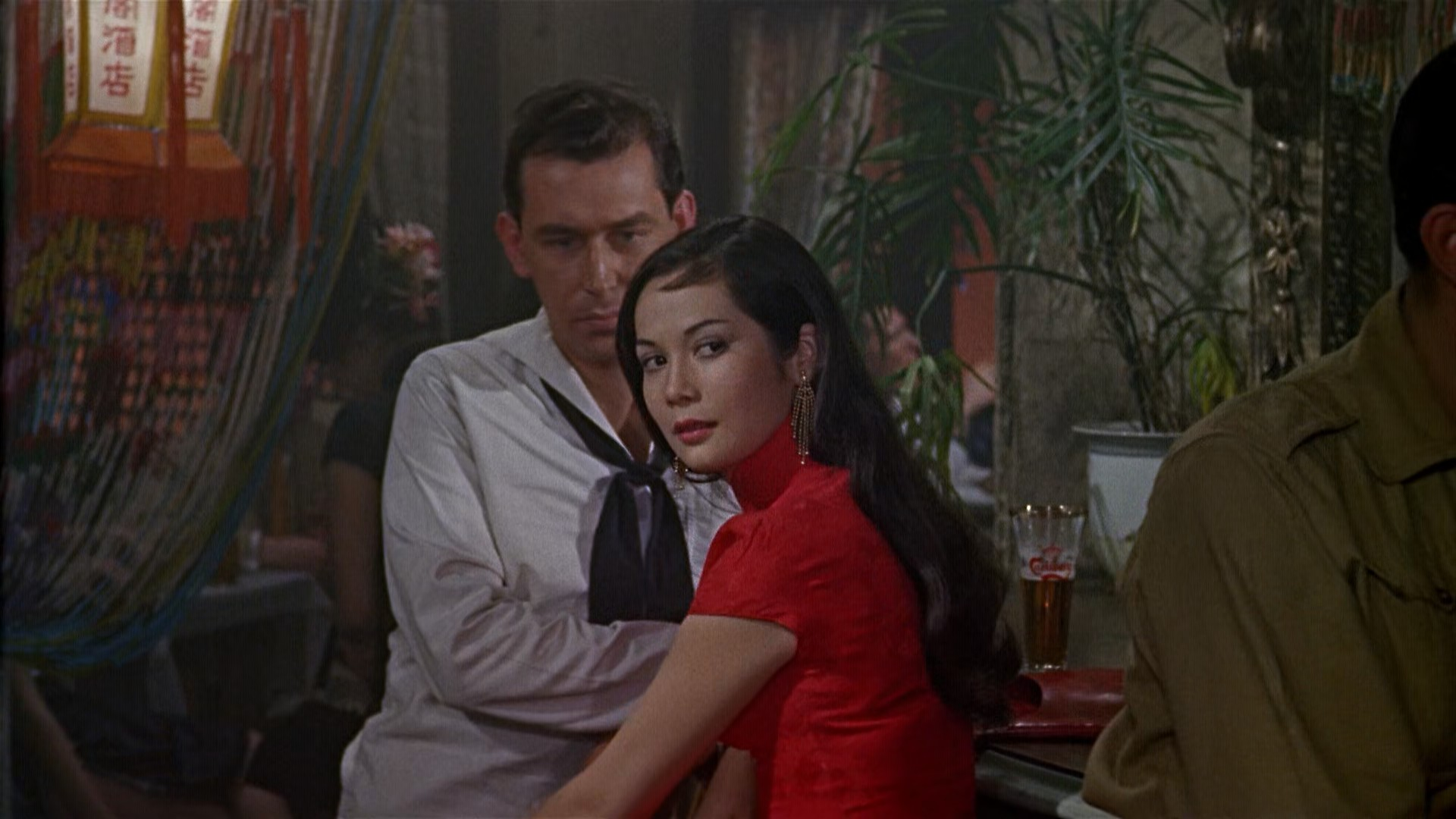
As Suzie Wong in The World of Suzie Wong (1960)

The World of Suzie Wong was a "box-office sensation". Critics lavished praise on Kwan for her performance. She was given the nickname "Chinese Bardot" for her unforgettable dance numbers. Kwan and two other actresses, Ina Balin and Hayley Mills, were awarded the Golden Globe for the "Most Promising Newcomer–Female" in 1960. The following year, she was voted a "Star of Tomorrow". Scholar Jennifer Leah Chan of New York University wrote that Suzie provided an Asian actress—Kwan—with the most significant Hollywood role since actress Anna May Wong's success in the 1920s.

Following The World of Suzie Wong, Kwan was totally unprepared for fame. While she was purchasing fabric in a store on Nathan Road, she found people staring at her from the window. Wondering what they were staring at, it suddenly struck her that she was the focus of attention. Kwan remarked that in Beverly Hills, she could walk without attracting attention. She reasoned, "[It] is better in America because America is much bigger, I guess". When people addressed her father after watching the film, they frequently called him "Mr. Wong", a name that really annoyed him. Kwan said in a 1994 interview with the South China Morning Post that even decades after her film debut and despite her having done over 50 films in the interim, viewers continued to send her many letters about the film.

The scene of Kwan, in repose on a davenport and adorned in a dazzling cheongsam, while showing a "deliciously decadent flash of thigh", became an iconic image. Similarly attired, Kwan appeared on the cover of Life magazine's October 1960 issue, cementing her status as a sex symbol for the 1960s. Nicknamed the "Suzie Wong dress", the cheongsam in the portrait spawned thousands of copycat promotional projects. In a 1962 interview, Kwan said she "loved" the cheongsam, calling it a "national costume". She explained that it "has slits because Chinese girls have pretty legs" and "the slits show their legs". (Note: In her 1962 interview with Pete Martin of The Saturday Evening Post, Kwan commented about the clothes worn by people from different cultures: "Japanese women have pretty necks so they wear a kimono with a collar away from the neck. American girls wear low-cut dresses because they have big busts.")

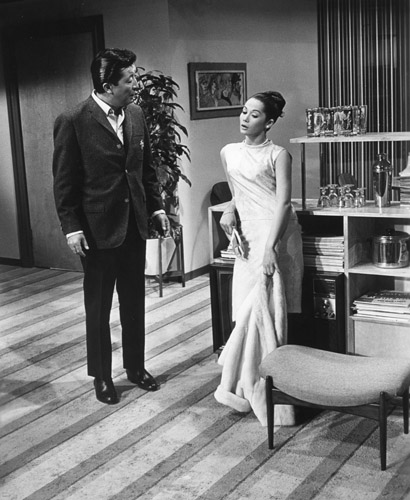
Jack Soo and Nancy Kwan in Flower Drum Song (1961)

Many Chinese and Chinese-Americans were upset after seeing the depiction of Chinese women as promiscuous. Tom Lisanti and Louis Paul write that the wave of unfavorable media attention drove filmmakers to try to capitalize on the attention and create an even bigger production for Kwan's next film. In 1961, she starred in Flower Drum Song playing a similar role. The film was distinguished for being the "first big-budget American film" with an all-Asian cast. (Note: Tom Lisanti and Louis Paul wrote that the film was noted for being the "first big-budget American film with an all–Chinese cast". Despite the film being set in Chinatown, four of the main characters were played by Japanese Americans. Two were Golden Globe Award winner James Shigeta and the first Asian Academy Award-winner Miyoshi Umeki. Non-Chinese actors in the ensemble included Filipino-American Patrick Adiarte and Japanese-American Jack Soo.) Kwan did not have any songs in the musical; the vocals for Linda Low were performed by B. J. Baker. Comparing Suzie Wong and Flower Drum Song, she found the latter much harder because the girl she played was "more go-getter". Her prior ballet education provided a strong foundation for her role in Flower Drum Song, where she had much space to dance. (Note: The film's three-building primary set cost $310,000, spanning 51,000 square feet. Modeled after Grant Avenue in Chinatown, San Francisco, it was up to that point the biggest, most expensive Hollywood sound stage ever designed.)

After starring in The World of Suzie Wong and Flower Drum Song, Kwan experienced a meteoric rise in fame. Scholar Jennifer Leah Chan of New York University chronicled the media attention Kwan received after starring in two Hollywood films, writing that Kwan's fame peaked in 1962. In addition to being featured on the cover of Life magazine, Kwan was the subject of a 1962 article in McCall's, entitled "The China Doll that Men Like".

As a Hollywood icon, Kwan lived in a house atop Laurel Canyon in Los Angeles. She drove a white British sports car and danced to Latin music. She enjoyed listening to Johnny Mathis records and reading Chinese history books. In 1962 (when she was 22), Kwan was dating Swiss actor Maximilian Schell. In an interview that year, she said she did not intend to get married until she was older, perhaps 24 or 25. She said a number of Americans married just to leave home or to "make love". Kwan said this was problematic because she found dialogue and an ability to appreciate and express humor important in a marriage: "You can't just sit around and stare at walls between love-making."

In 1961, Kwan offered to work as a teacher for King's Own Yorkshire Light Infantry. The infantry was training for military deployment in Malaya (now part of Malaysia), and the regiment's commanders believed that the infantrymen should be taught the Chinese language and how to handle chopsticks. Captain Anthony Hare announced that the infantry needed a teacher – an attractive one. He later acknowledged that he specified that the teacher "must be attractive" so that more soldiers would attend the sessions. Kwan, in Hollywood at the time, replied via cable: "Please consider me a candidate as Chinese teacher for Yorkshire Light Infantry. I am fluent in Chinese, fabulous with chopsticks, and fond of uniforms." Captain Hare commented, "Miss Kwan is too beautiful. I think she would be too much of a distraction." Her belated interest was not considered as the infantry had already accepted the application of another Chinese woman.

=== The Nancy Kwan Cut ===
In 1963, Nancy Kwan's long hair, famous from The World of Suzie Wong, was chopped into a sharp modernist bob by Vidal Sassoon for the film The Wild Affair, at the request of director John Krish. Her bob cut in the film drew widespread media attention for the "severe geometry of her new hairstyle". Sassoon's signature bob became known as "the Kwan cut", "the Kwan bob", or just "the Kwan"; photographs of Kwan's new hairstyle appeared in both the American and British editions of Vogue.

=== Later films ===
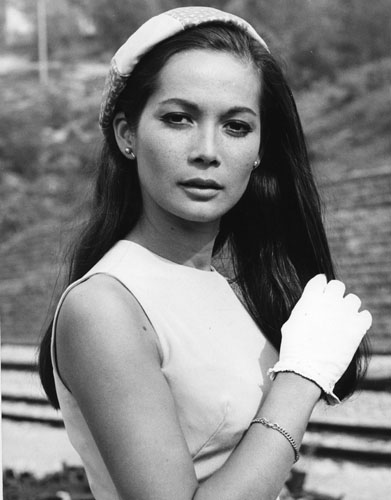
Kwan circa 1966

Kwan's success in her early career couldn't be replicated in later years. Ann Lloyd and Graham Fuller wrote in their book The Illustrated Who's Who of the Cinema: "Her Eurasian beauty and impish sense of humor could not sustain her stardom". Her later films were more varied, comprising movie and television roles in the US and Europe. Kwan discovered that she had to journey to Europe and Hong Kong to escape the ethnic typecasting in Hollywood that limited her to largely Asian roles in spite of her Eurasian appearance.

Her third movie was the British drama film The Main Attraction (1962) with Pat Boone. She played an Italian circus performer who was Boone's love interest. While she was filming the movie in the Austrian Alps, she met Peter Pock, a hotelier and ski instructor, with whom she immediately fell in love. She reflected, "The first time I saw that marvelous-looking man I said, 'That's for me.'" After several weeks, the two married and took up residence in Innsbruck, Tyrol, Austria. Kwan later gave birth to Bernhard "Bernie" Pock. In December 1963, Pock was constructing a luxury hotel in the Tyrolean Alps. During Christmas of that year, Nancy Kwan visited that location and was able to participate in several pre-1964 Winter Olympics events despite being busy with work. Her contract with film production company Seven Arts led her to travel around the world to film movies. She found the separation from her son, Bernie, who was not yet a year old, difficult. She said, "He's coming into a time when he's beginning to assert his personality." Fair-skinned and blue-eyed, Bernie more strongly resembled his father.

In 1963, Kwan starred as the title character in Tamahine. The role called for her to be blue-eyed and so she went to the optician to get the contact lenses needed for that look. Playing an English-Tahitian ward of the head master at an old English public school, she was praised by the Boston Globe for her "charming depict[ion]" of the character. (Note: The Tamahine's energetic nature either charms or bedevils her family members. With a libertine's disregard for clothes, Tamahine, an instructor at Hallow school, is welcomed as a guest to the headmaster's quarters. While at the school, she disrobes with no sense of impropriety; similarly when she returns home, she gleefully casts away all her clothing while cavorting into the ocean. Adorned in only a bra and panties, she tosses flowers to her students from her boudoir. Her "high-jinks" cause all the male students and the headmaster to become infatuated with her. The more conservative teachers are angered by those same hijinks.)

In Fate Is the Hunter (1964), her seventh film, Kwan played an ichthyologist. It was her first role as a Eurasian character. (Note: In Kwan's previous six films, she played non-Eurasian characters. In The World of Suzie Wong (1960), Kwan played a Hong Kong prostitute; in Flower Drum Song (1961), a Chinese-American residing in San Francisco, in The Main Attraction (1962), an Italian circus entertainer; in Tamahine (1963), an English-Tahitian; in The Wild Affair (1963), two English sisters, one of whom was "good", and the other of whom was "bad"; and in Honeymoon Hotel (1964), a New Yorker.) Kwan's roles were predominantly comic characters, which she said were more difficult roles than "straight dramatic work" owing to the necessity of more vigor and precise timing.

Kwan met Bruce Lee when he choreographed the martial arts moves in the film The Wrecking Crew (1969). As part of Kwan's role in the film, she fought Sharon Tate's character by throwing a flying kick. Her martial arts move was based not on karate training, but on her background in dance. Author Darrell Y. Hamamoto noted that this "ironically" tweaked Kwan's "dragon-lady role" number by notably replacing Kung Fu with Western dance moves. She became close friends with Lee and met his wife and two children. In the 1970s, both Kwan and Lee returned to Hong Kong, where they remained friends.

Kwan divorced Peter Pock in June 1968. She married Hollywood screenwriter David Giler in July 1970 in a civil ceremony in Carson City, Nevada. The marriage was Kwan's second and Giler's first. They divorced in 1971.

That year, Kwan returned to Hong Kong with her son because her father was sick. She initially intended to remain for one year to assist him, but ultimately remained for about seven years. She did not stop working, starring as Dr. Sue in the film Wonder Women (1973). While in Hong Kong, Kwan founded a production company, Nancy Kwan Films, which made ads largely targeted at the Southeast Asian market. In the 1980s, she returned to the United States, where she played characters in the television series Fantasy Island, Knots Landing and Trapper John, M.D..

In 1976 Kwan married Norbert Meisel, an actor, director, screenwriter, and producer. Like her first husband Peter Pock, as well as her former fiancé Maximilian Schell, Meisel was Austrian. "I have my Austrian karma," she said in a 2021 interview. "I think it's lifetime."

In a 1993 interview with the St. Petersburg Times, Kwan remarked that her son Bernie was frequently called a "blond, blue-eyed Chinese" because he could speak the language fluently. In 1979, the two returned to the United States because Kwan wanted him to finish his schooling there. Bernie was an actor, a martial artist, and a stunt performer. For the 1991 action comedy film Fast Getaway, fellow stunt performer Kenny Bates and he clasped hands and lept off the Royal Gorge Bridge. They fell 900 ft before being restrained by wire rope 200 ft over the Arkansas River. Bates said their stunt was the "highest 'double drop' ever attempted". Kwan and Bernie recorded a tape about tai chi.

=== Later years ===
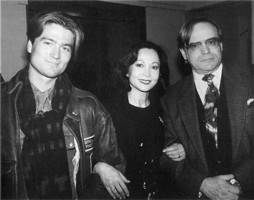
Nancy Kwan with her son, Bernhard "Bernie" Pock, and her husband, Norbert Meisel, 1993

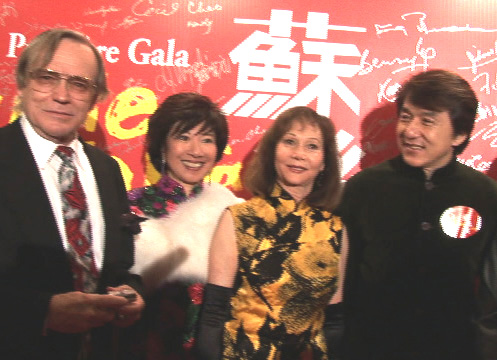
Nancy Kwan and Jackie Chan at the Hong Kong Ballet's premiere gala of Suzie Wong, 2006

In 1987, Nancy Kwan co-founded the restaurant Joss Cuisine. Kwan, producer Ray Stark, and restaurateur and Hong Kong film director Cecile Tang financed the restaurant, located on the Sunset Strip in West Hollywood.

Kwan has sporadically recorded audiobooks. In 1995, Kwan recorded an audiobook for Anchee Min's memoir Red Azalea in what Publishers Weekly called a "coolly understated performance that allows the story's subtleties and unexpected turns to work by themselves". In 2011, she recorded an audiobook for the 1989 memoir When Heaven and Earth Changed Places by Le Ly Hayslip with Jay Wurts. The San Francisco Chronicle's Patricia Holt praised Kwan's intonation in her delivery, writing that "Kwan's faint Asian accent and careful pronunciation of Vietnamese words make Hayslip's weaving of her past and present lives a riveting experience".

In 1993, Kwan played Gussie Yang, a "tough-talking, soft-hearted Hong Kong restaurateur", in the fictional Dragon: The Bruce Lee Story. She played a pivotal role in the film, a character based on Seattle restaurateur and political leader Ruby Chow who hires Bruce Lee as a dishwasher and gives him the funds to open a martial arts school.

In May 1993, she completed a film about Eurasians entitled Loose Woman With No Face, which she wrote, directed, and starred in. She called the film "a slice of life about Euro-Asians in Los Angeles, and it's something I know about".

Around that time, Kwan was asked about whether she was confronted with racism as a leading Asian Hollywood actress in the 1960s. Kwan replied, "That was 30 years ago and (prejudice) wasn't such a heavy issue then. I was just in great Broadway productions that were turned into films. I personally never felt any racial problems in Hollywood." In the 1990s, the number of parts available to her dried up. She attributed this to both her age and the movie business' aversion to casting Asians in non-Asian roles. In earlier years, she had been able to play an Italian and a Tahitian.

In the 1990s, there were more Hollywood films about Asians. Kwan could have capitalized on the trend through a role in the 1993 film The Joy Luck Club. But because the filmmakers refused to excise a line calling The World of Suzie Wong a "...horrible racist film," she passed on the role. (Note: Kwan said Suzie Wong was not a racist movie. If it had been racist, she would not have been in it. She noted that the film was about the biracial relationship between the characters played by Kwan and William Holden. Kwan said, "I'm the product of an interracial marriage. Why is that racist?" Three actresses who played Suzie Wong in stage roles, including France Nguyen, were cast in The Joy Luck Club.)

In November 1993, Kwan co-starred in the two-character play Arthur and Leila about two siblings who struggle with their Chinese identities. It debuted in the Bay Front Theater in Fort Mason, San Francisco, and moved to Los Angeles two weeks later. (Note: Adorned in a bob cut, black tights, and a silk blouse from costume designer Ken Takemoto, Kwan played the character Leila Chin-Abernathy. The stylish and well-dressed Leila is a direct contrast to her scruffy alcoholic brother Arthur, played by Dana Lee. Leila, a wealthy local celebrity, supports her brother, a degenerate gambler, by buying family heirlooms from him. Brother and sister reminisce about their family life; with each family item exchanged, they become closer. Written by Cherylene Lee, who had been in the cast of the 1961 film Flower Drum Song with Kwan, the play received the 1994 Fund for New American Plays award, a $30,000 grant.) Variety reviewer Julio Martinez praised Kwan for her ability to "flo[w] easily between haughty sophistication and girlish insecurity".

In 1994, an article in the South China Morning Post said that she preserved her "dancer's figure" through the Chinese martial art tai chi and frequent dance sessions. That year, she assumed the role of 52-year-old Martha in Singapore Repertory Theatre's showing of Who's Afraid of Virginia Woolf?, an "intense psychological play" by Edward Albee.

In 1995, she produced and acted in the feature film Rebellious. Her son Bernie was the director, writer, and star of the film, which was co-produced by Norbert Meisel.

In 1996, when he was 33, Kwan's son, Bernie, died after contracting AIDS from a girlfriend Kwan had advised him to avoid. Four years after his death, poet and actress Amber Tamblyn compiled her debut poetry book Of the Dawn and dedicated it to Pock. Tamblyn had acted in Rebellious when she was nine, alongside her father Russ Tamblyn. Calling Pock a "big brother", she said he was the "first guy" to convince her to share her poems.

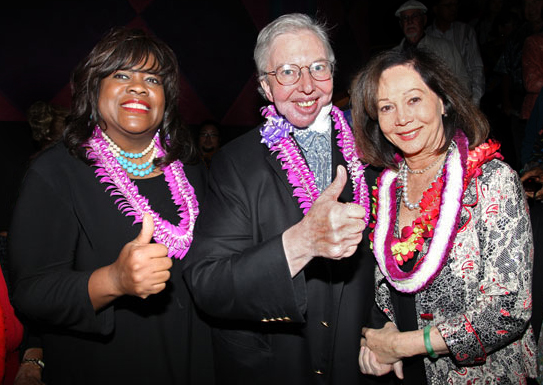
Roger Ebert and his wife Chaz Hammel-Smith gave the thumbs up to Nancy Kwan at the Hawaii International Film Festival on October 20, 2010.

Nancy Kwan has appeared on television commercials into the 1990s and appeared in commercials for the cosmetic "Oriental Pearl Cream". (Note: In the infomercials, Kwan would say an advertising catchphrase coined by copywriter Gary Halbert: "If your friends don't actually accuse you of having had a face-lift, return the empty jar ...")

Kwan has been involved in philanthropy for AIDS awareness. In 1997, she published A Celebration of Life – Memories of My Son, a book about her son who died after being infected with HIV. She contributed the profits from both the book and a movie she made about him to support the study of AIDS and the promotion of AIDS awareness.

On March 17, 2006, cheongsam-wearing Kwan and her husband, Norbert Meisel, attended the debut performance of Hong Kong Ballet's depiction of Suzie Wong at Sha Tin Town Hall. Kwan told The Kansas City Star in 2007 that she had not considered retiring, saying that it leads to trouble. Retirees, she professed, frequently find themselves with nothing to do because they have not readied themselves for it. Kwan said, "I hope I'm working until the day I die. If work is a pleasure, why not?" In 2006, Kwan reunited with Flower Drum Song co-star James Shigeta to perform A. R. Gurney's two-person play Love Letters. They performed the play at Los Angeles' East West Players and San Francisco's Herbst Theatre.

Kwan appeared in Arthur Dong's 2007 documentary Hollywood Chinese, where she joined other Chinese luminaries in discussing past accomplishments and future prospects for people of Chinese descent in the movie industry.

Kwan and her husband Norbert Meisel write and direct films about Asian-Americans. Kwan believes that Asians are not depicted in enough films and TV shows. She and her husband have resolved to create their own scripts and films about Asian characters. In 2007, they wrote, directed, and produced Star of Sunshine, a Bildungsroman film starring Boys Don't Cry actress Cheyenne Rushing, who plays Rachel. An talented pianist growing up in a troubled home, Rachel journeys to find her peripatetic father, a musician who deserted her when she was a child. In Sunshine, Rachel is supported by Kwan, the manager of a jazz club, who knows a secret about her. In the film's final scene, Kwan dances, an activity she has enjoyed since her youth.

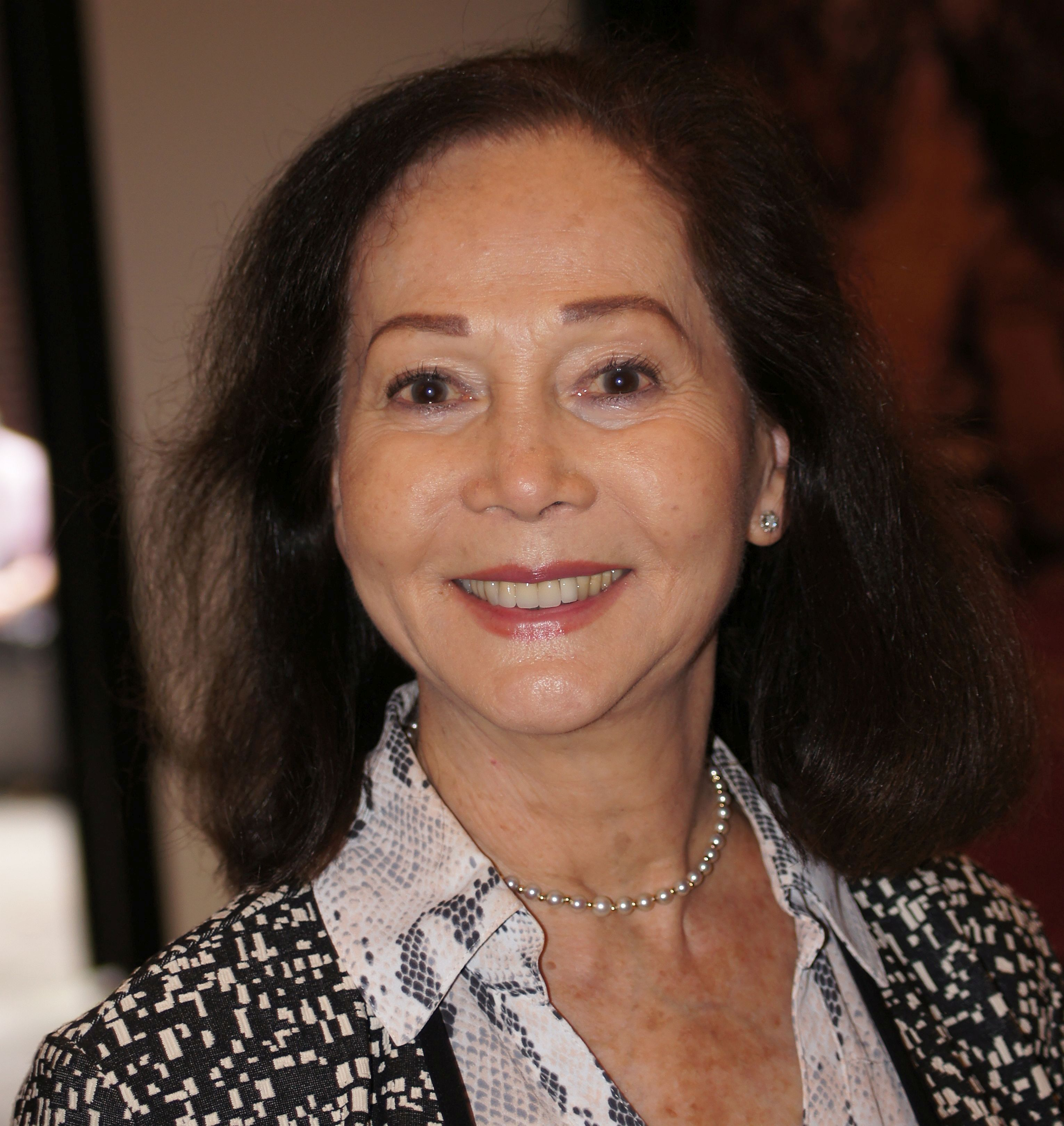
Kwan in 2019

Kwan wrote an introduction to the 2008 book For Goodness Sake: A Novel of the Afterlife of Suzie Wong written by American author James Clapp under the pen name Sebastian Gerard. Clapp became acquainted with Kwan through director Brian Jamieson, who was filming a documentary about Kwan's life. (Note: Clapp, a professor of urbanism who has travelled frequently to teach in Hong Kong, is from California. The novel's title is a tribute to Wong's Chinese Pidgin English. Main character Marco Podesta is, like Clapp, an urbanism professor. His visit to Hong Kong coincides with the transfer of sovereignty over Hong Kong in 1997. He meets and becomes infatuated with a Chinese girl, Lily. Podesta, while strolling through Sheung Wan, discovers a painting featured in a gallery window. The painting's subject, a Chinese girl, wears a ponytail and cheongsam. To Podesta, she is Suzie Wong. He becomes infatuated with her and meets the painting's artist, Robert Lomax, who is either Suzie Wong's male lead or an insane man. Author Clapp was inspired to write the novel when he was traveling on the Star Ferry in 2000 and saw a young lady's flowing ponytail from behind. He said, "Now, I know there are thousands of women in Hong Kong with ponytails, but somehow the film started rolling in my head and I started to write notes.")

Kwan serves as a spokeswoman for the Asian American Voters Coalition, a pan-Asian political organization established in 1986 to support Asian actors.

In her performing arts career, Kwan has appeared in two television series and over 50 films. The Straits Times reported in March 2011 that Kwan continues to serve as a film screenwriter and executive.

Kwan currently resides in Los Angeles and has family members in Hong Kong. Once every few years, she travels to the former colony.

== Filmography ==
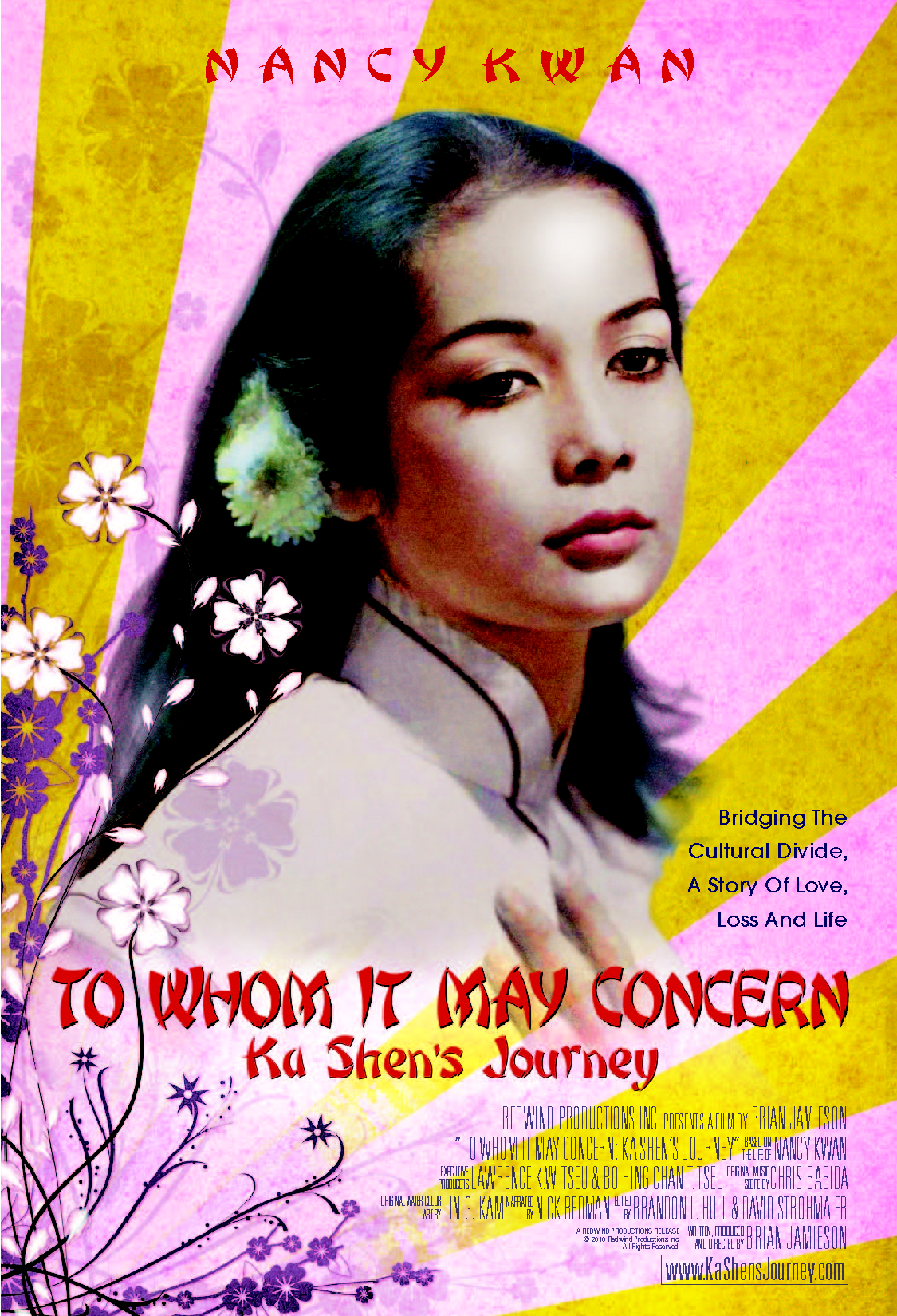
Poster of To Whom It May Concern: Ka Shen's Journey, a 2009 docudrama about the actress.

=== Film ===
Year	Title	Role	Notes
1960	The World of Suzie Wong	Suzie Wong	
1961	Flower Drum Song	Linda Low	
1962	The Main Attraction	Tessa	
1963	Tamahine	Tamahine	
1964	Honeymoon Hotel	Lynn Jenley	
1964	Fate Is the Hunter	Sally Fraser	
1965	The Wild Affair	Marjorie Lee	Filmed in 1963
1966	Lt. Robin Crusoe, U.S.N.	Wednesday	
1966	Drop Dead Darling	Baby	a.k.a. Arrivederci, Baby!
1966	Mong fu sek	Mei Ching	Short
1967	The Peking Medallion	Tina	a.k.a. The Corrupt Ones
1968	Nobody's Perfect	Tomiko Momoyama	
1968	The Wrecking Crew	Wen Yurang	
1969	The Girl Who Knew Too Much	Revel Drue	
1970	The McMasters	Robin	
1971	Karioka etchos de America		
1973	Wonder Women	Dr. Tsu	
1974	Bu zai you chun tian		
1974	The Pacific Connection	Leni	
1975	Fortress in the Sun	Maria	
1975	Supercock	Yuki Chan	
1975	That Lady from Peking	Sue Tenchan	
1976	Project Kill	Lee Su	
1978	Out of the Darkness	Leslie	a.k.a. Night Creature
1980	Streets of Hong Kong	Mei Mei	
1982	Angkor: Cambodia Express	Sue	
1985	Walking the Edge	Christine Holloway	
1988	Keys to Freedom	Dr. Lao	
1989	Night Children	Diane	
1990	Cold Dog Soup	Madame Chang	
1993	Dragon: The Bruce Lee Story	Gussie Yang	
1995	Rebellious	Joni	
1996	For Life or Death	Ling Li	
1998	Mr. P's Dancing Sushi Bar	Mitsuko McFee	
2005	Murder on the Yellow Brick Road	Natalie Chung	
2006	Ray of Sunshine	Lilly	
2016	Paint It Black	Margaret	
2016	Window Horses: The Poetic Persian Epiphany of Rosie Ming	Gloria (voice)	

=== Television ===
Year	Title	Role	Notes
1968–1969	Hawaii Five-O	Rosemary Quong	"Pilot", "Cocoon: Parts 1 & 2"
1974	Kung Fu	Mayli Ho	"The Cenotaph: Parts 1 & 2"
1976	Hadleigh	Kai Yin	"Hong Kong Rock"
1978	Fantasy Island	Adela	"The Appointment/Mr. Tattoo"
1982	Chicago Story	Hoanh Anh	"Not Quite Paradise: Parts 1 & 2"
1983	The Last Ninja	Noriko Sakura	TV film
1984	Trapper John, M.D.	Dr. Lois Miyoshiro	"This Gland Is Your Gland"
1984	Partners in Crime	Anna Chen	"Duke"
1984	Knots Landing	Beverly Mikuriya	"Hanging Fire"
1985	Blade in Hong Kong	Lily	TV film
1986	The A-Team	Lin Wu	"The Point of No Return"
1988	Noble House	Claudia Chen	TV miniseries
1990	Miracle Landing	C.B. Lansing	TV film
1990	Babies	Dr. Liu	TV film
2000	ER	Mrs. Chen	"Rescue Me"

== Awards ==
- 1961 Golden Globe Award for Best Actress – Drama (Nominated) for The World of Suzie Wong
- 1961 Golden Globe Award for Most Promising Newcomer – Female, shared with Ina Balin and Hayley Mills
- Golden Ring Award
- Historymaker for Excellence in the Performing Arts – Chinese American Museum of Los Angeles, California
- Visionary Award – East West Players, April 28, 2003
- Lifetime Achievement Award – Chinatown, Los Angeles, June 2009
- Maverick Award – Hawaii International Film Festival, October 2010
- Lifetime Achievement Award – San Diego Asian Film Festival, October 2011
- Lifetime Achievement Award – Museum of Chinese in America, November 2015
- AHF Inductee & Lifetime Achievement Award - Asian Hall of Fame, 2021

== Bibliography ==
- Pock, Bernie; Kwan, Nancy (1997). A Celebration of Life, Memories of My Son. N&N Publications. ISBN 978-0-9664395-0-2.

== See also ==
- Anna May Wong, a Chinese-American Hollywood actress, active in the early 20th century
- Kevin Kwan, Singapore-American author, distant cousin to Nancy Kwan
