= John LaMotta =

American actor (1939–2014)

- Born: John LaMotta; January 8, 1939; New York City, New York, U.S.
- Died: January 29, 2014 (aged 75); Los Angeles, California, U.S.
- Occupation: Actor
- Years active: 1970s–2000
- Known for: ALF; American Ninja

John LaMotta (January 8, 1939 – January 29, 2014) was an American character actor best known for playing Trevor Ochmonek, the Tanners' grouchy next-door neighbor, on the NBC sitcom ALF from 1986 to 1990, appearing in 40 episodes opposite Liz Sheridan. Earlier in his career, he appeared in action films directed by Sam Firstenberg, including Revenge of the Ninja (1983) and American Ninja (1985).

== Early life ==
John LaMotta was born in Brooklyn, New York, on January 8, 1939.

== Career ==
LaMotta started acting for director Sam Firstenberg in his debut film One More Chance in 1981. Later, he worked in supporting roles in most of Firstenberg's works, like Revenge of the Ninja (1983) and American Ninja (1985). His early television appearances included roles in the series Baretta, Barney Miller, Cagney & Lacey, and Hill Street Blues.

From 1986 to 1990, he played the insensitive neighbor Trevor Ochmonek in Paul Fusco's sitcom ALF. In 2010, he told in an interview: "I thought the show ALF was a piece of shit … worst work I ever did.“

After ALF, LaMotta played numerous small roles in television including the series Growing Pains, ER, and Frasier.

In the last years of his life, he was involved in a theatrical group in Los Angeles.

== Personal life and death ==
LaMotta is the nephew of the infamous boxer Jake LaMotta. He died in Los Angeles, California, in 2014.

== Selected Filmography ==
=== Film ===
- A Place Called Today (1972)
- Mean Johnny Barrows (1976)
- 2076 Olympiad (1977)
- One More Chance (1981)
- Revenge of the Ninja (1983)
- Ninja III: The Domination (1984)
- Breakin' 2: Electric Boogaloo (1984)
- American Ninja (1985)
- Running Scared (1986)
- Why Me? (1990)
- We're Talking Serious Money (1992)
- Bloodfist IV: Die Trying (1992)
- Lookin' Italian (1994)
- The Scout (1994)
- Pet Shop (1994)
- In This Corner (1994)
- Vampire in Brooklyn (1995)
- Fatal Choice (1995)
- Motel Blue (1997)
- The Godson (1998)
- Five Acres (1999)

=== Television ===
- Cagney & Lacey (Season 3, Episode 6 - Dimitrius in Partners)
- Frasier (Dukes, We Hardly Knew Ye, "Where Every Bloke Knows Your Name")
