= Michael Dudikoff =

American actor

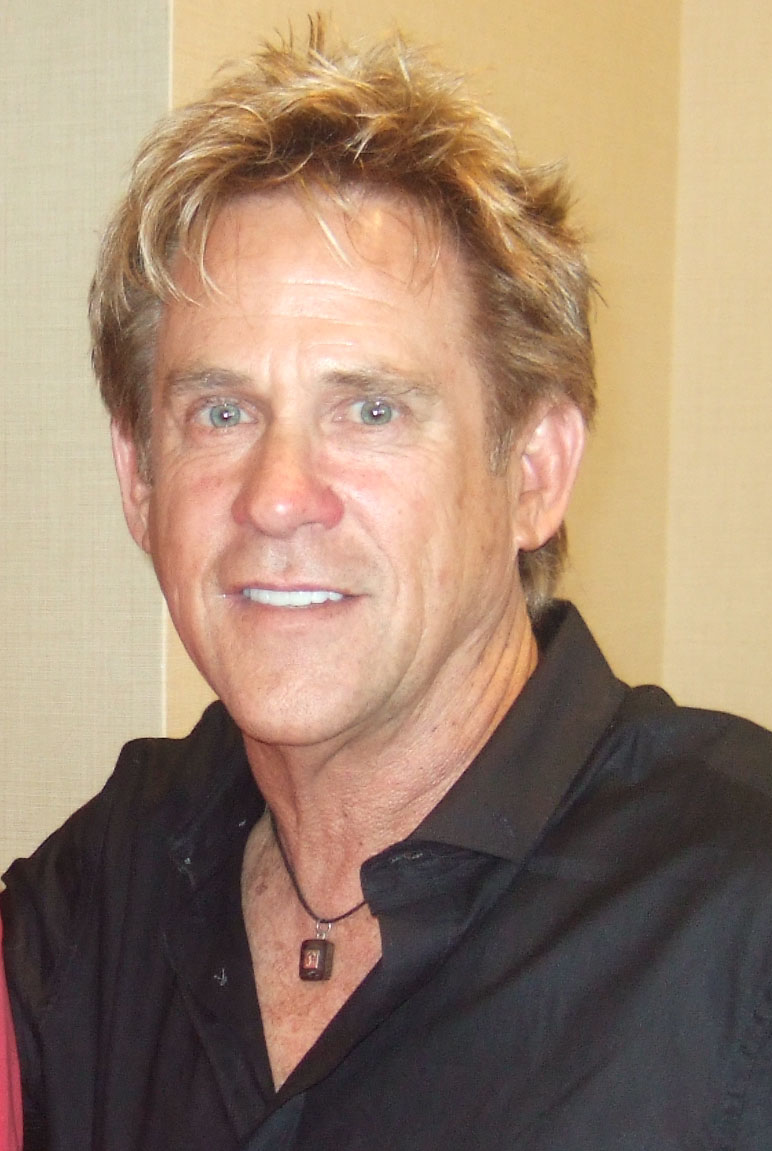
- Dudikoff in 2013
- Born: Michael Joseph Stephen Dudikoff Jr. October 8, 1954 (age 71); Redondo Beach, California, U.S.
- Education: Los Angeles Harbor College
- Occupations: Actor, martial artist
- Years active: 1978–2004, 2013–present
- Spouse: Belle Dudikoff (m. 2004)
- Children: 3

Michael Joseph Stephen Dudikoff Jr., (born October 8, 1954) is an American actor, model and martial artist. Dudikoff began his career as a model, then started landing supporting roles in films and television shows, before getting his break as the lead in the martial arts action film American Ninja (1985).

Dudikoff regularly appeared as an action film leading man, starring in Avenging Force (1986), American Ninja 2: The Confrontation (1987), Platoon Leader (1988), River of Death (1989), American Ninja 4: The Annihilation (1990), Soldier Boyz (1996), Bounty Hunters (1996), Bounty Hunters 2: Hardball (1997), etc.

In the 2000s, Dudikoff started to work in real estate, and made film appearances in the 2010s.

== Early life ==
Dudikoff was born in the Los Angeles suburb of Redondo Beach, California. Dudikoff's father, Michael Sr., was Eastern Orthodox Christian. Born in New York to Russian immigrants Mary Bogdanova and John Dudikoff, Michael Sr. served in the Army before marrying Dudikoff's mother, Rita T. Girardin, a French-Canadian piano player from Quebec. The couple moved to California and had five children; the fourth, Michael Jr., was diagnosed with dyslexia. Michael Dudikoff Jr. graduated from West High School in Torrance, California, and went on to study child psychology at Harbor College.

== Career ==
=== Mid 1970s to 1985: Modeling and early roles ===
To pay for his education, Dudikoff worked at a rehabilitation center for abused youth called Cedar House and waited tables at Beachbum Burt's in Redondo Beach, California. He was eventually approached to do some modelling, and appeared at a shopping mall. During lunch one day, Dudikoff served Max Evans, a fashion editor with Esquire, who had come in with some models. Evans asked Dudikoff to walk in a Newport Beach fashion show, and his mother encouraged him to try it out. After a couple of successful runways, Dudikoff retained an agent at the Mary Webb Davis Agency in Los Angeles. Dudikoff soon entered the high fashion world and counted Calvin Klein and GQ among his clients. He moved quickly to international print modeling and traveled between New York, Los Angeles, and Milan by his late 20s. Dudikoff soon began acting, and he starred in several commercials for companies, including Coppertone, Coca-Cola for Japan, Army Reserve and Stridex.

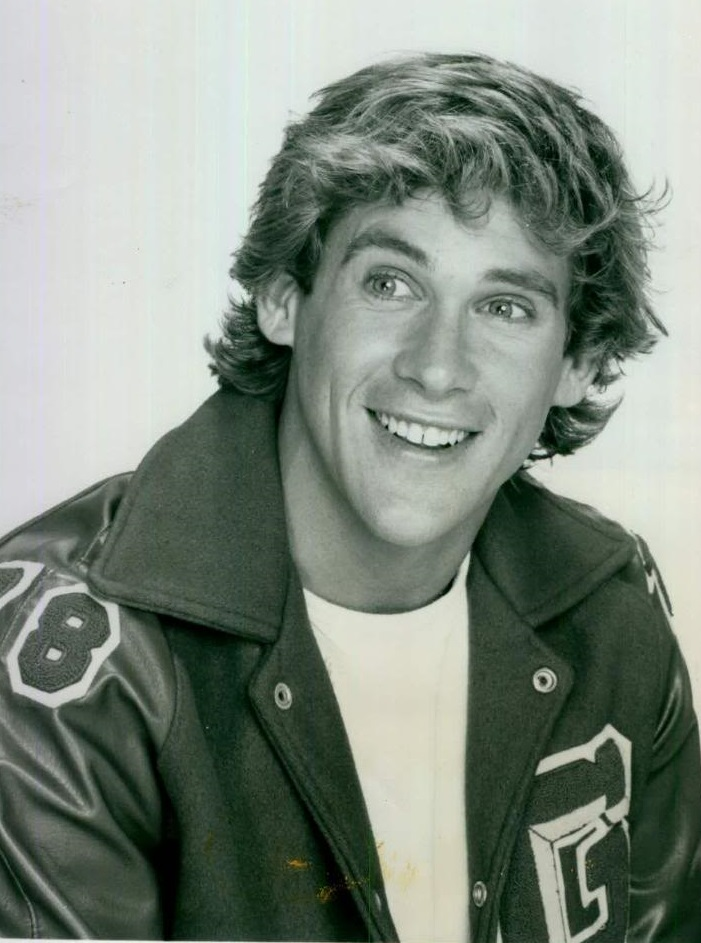
Dudikoff as Douggie Krebs on Star of the Family in 1982

Dudikoff's first television role took place after a meeting with theatrical agent Sid Craig. He went for some readings, and in 1978 he landed a supporting role in one episode of the hit TV show Dallas, and shortly after the part as Joanie's first boyfriend in the American sitcom Happy Days. Dudikoff said the president of Paramount Studio happened to be sitting in the audience while they were filming and gave him a contract.

=== Early 1980s to 1985: Subsequent roles and breakthrough ===
In 1980, Dudikoff acted in The Black Marble. In 1981, Dudikoff acted in Bloody Birthday, and The Best Little Girl in the World. In 1982, Dudikoff acted in Neil Simon's I Ought to Be in Pictures, Making Love, and Tron. Also that year he was one of the leads in the sitcom Star of the Family. In 1983, he acted in Uncommon Valor, one episode of Gimme a Break!, and played Huckleberry Finn in a Columbia Pictures movie-of-the-week called Sawyer & Finn directed by Peter H. Hunt. In 1984, Dudikoff acted in the comedy film Bachelor Party.

In 1985, The Cannon Group, an independent film company with a streak of successful action films, were looking to produce an action film starring Chuck Norris called American Ninja, which Norris turned down. Shortly after, Cannon went on a worldwide search to find who would play Private Joe Armstrong, the American ninja. Over 400 candidates went on to audition for the part. The producer and owner of Cannon, Menahem Golan, and director Sam Firstenberg thought Dudikoff was the obvious choice for the part. Golan even went on to say that he would be the next James Dean. It was a surprise for Dudikoff, who at the time was mostly known for supporting roles in comedies. It was Dudikoff's first collaboration with actor Steve James, who was hired to play the partner of the American ninja, a role he maintained for the first three installments. On a $1 million budget, it went on to gross over $10 million domestically in the US and did extremely well in foreign markets. This success would establish the start of the American Ninja film franchise, with Dudikoff becoming a regular action star for The Cannon Group. That same year, Dudikoff and John Stockwell were co-leads in Albert Pyun's post-apocalyptic film Radioactive Dreams.

=== 1986 to mid-2000s: Action film leading man ===
In 1986, Dudikoff returned to the title role of Joe Armstrong in American Ninja 2: The Confrontation, with Firstenberg directing. The film grossed $4 million domestically in the U.S. That same year, Dudikoff starred as retired secret service agent in Avenging Force, with Steve James, directed by Sam Firstenberg. Also, Dudikoff played the role of Lt. Rudy Bodford in the mini-series North and South, Book II.

In 1987, he had signed an agreement with Cannon Films to star and produce seven films.

In 1988, Dudikoff played the lead in Vietnam war film Platoon Leader, directed by Aaron Norris.

In 1989, Dudikoff starred as an adventurer in Steve Carver's River of Death.

In 1989, Dudikoff turned down American Ninja 3: Blood Hunt because he didn't want to get type cast in martial arts movies and didn't want to go back to South Africa as he was firmly against the Apartheid movement.

In 1990, he starred in the action-horror film Midnight Ride opposite Mark Hamill.

In 1991, Dudikoff acted in the television film The Woman Who Sinned. That year in American Ninja's fourth instalment American Ninja 4: The Annihilation, he returned to the role of Joe Armstrong.

In 1992, Dudikoff starred in The Human Shield directed by Ted Post.

In 1993, Dudikoff co-starred with Ami Dolenz and Stephen Dorff in Arthur Allan Seidelman's Rescue Me. Also that year, Dudikoff was the lead role in the action TV series Cobra. The hour-long show ran for 22 episodes from 1993 to 1994.

In 1994, Dudikoff did his final film with The Cannon Group, called Chain of Command directed by David Worth.

In 1995, Dudikoff starred in Cyberjack, and Soldier Boyz.

In 1996, Dudikoff starred Bounty Hunters, Moving Target, and Crash Dive.

In 1997, Dudikoff starred in Strategic Command, Bounty Hunters 2: Hardball, and The Shooter.

In 1998, Dudikoff starred in Black Thunder, Freedom Strike, Musketeers Forever, and Counter Measures a sequel to Crash Dive. He also played in the Ringmaster starring Jerry Springer.

In 1999, Dudikoff acted in Sidney J. Furie's In Her Defense, Fred Olen Ray's Fugitive Mind, and The Silencer.

In 2001, Dudikoff acted in Ablaze.

In 2002, Dudikoff played the main villain in Gale Force, starring Treat Williams. He also starred in Sam Firstenberg's Quicksand, and Fred Olen Ray's Stranded.

=== 2003 to present day: Current works ===
Moving forward, Dudikoff worked in real estate.

In 2014, Dudikoff was interviewed for The Go-Go Boys: The Inside Story of Cannon Films and Electric Boogaloo: The Wild, Untold Story of Cannon Films, both highly publicized dueling documentaries about The Cannon Group. In 2015, Dudikoff played a supporting role in Navy Seals vs. Zombies, released by Anchor Bay Entertainment. In 2018, Dudikoff acted in Fury of the Fist and the Golden Fleece.

== Personal life ==
Dudikoff and his wife Belle have been married since 2004; they have three children.

== Martial arts and fitness ==
Dudikoff had no martial arts training before making the first American Ninja movie, but he was already very athletic. Fight choreographer Mike Stone, an accomplished martial arts expert, assured the producers that Dudikoff would pick up the moves.

Dudikoff has since trained in Karate, Aikido, Judo, and Brazilian Jiu-Jitsu and attained black belts in Karate, Brazilian Jiu-Jitsu and Judo. He began his training in Brazilian jiu-jitsu with Rorion Gracie and stays connected with the Brazilian jiu-jitsu fighting circuit, including Rigan Machado, an eighth degree red and black belt in Brazilian jiu-jitsu and former world champion.

== Filmography ==
=== Film ===
Year	Title	Role	Notes
1980	The Black Marble	Millie's Houseboy	
1981	Bloody Birthday	Willard	
1982	Making Love	Young Man In Bar #2	
1982	Neil Simon's I Ought to Be in Pictures	Boy On Bus	
1982	Tron	Conscript #2	as Michael J. Dudikoff II
1983	Uncommon Valor	Blaster's Assistant	
1984	Bachelor Party	Ryko	
1985	Radioactive Dreams	Marlowe Hammer	
1985	American Ninja	Private Joe Armstrong	
1986	Avenging Force	Captain Matt Hunter	
1987	American Ninja 2: The Confrontation	Sergeant Joe Armstrong	
1988	Platoon Leader	Lieutenant Jeff Knight	
1989	River of Death	John Hamilton	
1990	Midnight Ride	Lawson	
1990	American Ninja 4: The Annihilation	Agent Joe Armstrong	
1992	The Human Shield	Colonel Doug Matthews	
1992	Rescue Me	Daniel 'Mac' MacDonald	
1994	Chain of Command	Merrill Ross	
1995	Cyberjack	Nick James	
1995	Soldier Boyz	Major Howard Toliver	
1996	Bounty Hunters	Jersey Bellini	Direct-to-video
1997	Moving Target	Sonny	
1997	Strategic Command	Dr. Rick Harding	Direct-to-video
1997	Crash Dive	James Carter	Direct-to-video
1997	Bounty Hunters 2: Hardball	Jersey Bellini	Direct-to-video
1997	The Shooter	Michael Atherton	
1998	Freedom Strike	Tom Dickson	
1998	Black Thunder	Vince Conners	
1998	Counter Measures	Captain Jake Fuller	Direct-to-video
1998	Ringmaster	Rusty	
1998	Musketeers Forever	D'Artagnan	
1999	In Her Defense	Andrew Garfield	
1999	Fugitive Mind	Robert Dean	Direct-to-video
2000	The Silencer	Quinn Simmons	
2001	Ablaze	Gary Daniels	Direct-to-video
2002	Gale Force	Jared	Direct-to-video
2002	Quicksand	Bill Turner	Direct-to-video
2002	Stranded	Ed Carpenter	Direct-to-video
2015	Navy Seals vs. Zombies	Lieutenant Commander Sheer	
2015	The Bouncer	Samuel James	
2018	Fury of the Fist and the Golden Fleece	Superboss	
2021	Landfill	Mr. Lindbergh	
2022	Trail Blazers	Matthew	
TBA	Left Turn	Senator	

=== Television ===
Year	Title	Role	Notes
1978	Dallas	Joe Newcomb	1 episode
1979	Out of the Blue	Lenny	1 episode
1979–1980	Happy Days	Jason / Jim	2 episodes
1981	The Best Little Girl in the World	Chuck	Television film
1982	Star of the Family	Douggie Krebs	10 episodes
1983	Gimme a Break!	Greg Hartman	1 episode
1986	North and South, Book II	Lieutenant Rudy Bodford	6 episodes
1991	The Woman Who Sinned	Evan Ganns	Television film
1993–1994	Cobra	Robert 'Scandal' Jackson Jr.	22 episodes
1994	Historias de la puta mili	Himself	1 episode
2013	Zombie Break Room	'Tank' Dempsey	Television film; also executive producer
2019	Green Valley	Uncle Rik	Television film

=== Video games ===
Year	Title	Role	Notes
1997	Soldier Boyz	Major Howard Toliver	Voice role
2018	B-Team	General Dudikoff	Voice role
