= Steve James (actor) =

American actor (1952–1993)

- Undated headshot of James
- Born: Steven Wall James; February 19, 1952; New York City, New York, U.S.
- Died: December 18, 1993 (aged 41); Burbank, California, U.S.
- Education: LIU Post
- Occupations: Actor, stunt performer
- Years active: 1970–1993
- Spouses: Nava Halimi (m. 1987, divorced); Christine Pan James (m. 1992)
- Children: 1

Steven Wall James (February 19, 1952 – December 18, 1993) was an American actor and stunt performer. He was best-known for his roles in 1980s action films, often from Cannon Films, such as the American Ninja series, The Delta Force (1986), The Exterminator (1980), and Avenging Force (1986). He also portrayed Kung Fu Joe in the 1988 comedy/spoof film I'm Gonna Git You Sucka, and its 1990 television pilot spinoff Hammer, Slammer, & Slade.

== Early life ==
James was born and raised in New York City. His father was trumpet player Hubie James, and his uncle was James Wall, who played Mr. Baxter on the children's television series Captain Kangaroo. His godfather was Joe Seneca who, among many roles, played Danny Glover's character's father in Silverado. Seneca was instrumental in Steve becoming interested in action films as he took him to movies on 42nd Street when he was a child. He graduated from Power Memorial Academy in 1970, then attended C. W. Post College as an Arts and Film major.

James was a long-time practitioner of the Chinese martial art fu jow pai.

== Career ==
Upon graduating he became involved in stage work and TV commercials. James started his film career off as a stunt performer for such New York based film productions as The Wiz, The Warriors, and The Wanderers. He began playing bit parts in the mid-1970s, appearing in films such as The Land That Time Forgot (1974) and The Warriors (1979).

In 1980, James had his first notable role in James Glickenhaus's vigilante film The Exterminator. The film is about two Vietnam veterans played by James and Robert Ginty, who live in the Bronx. James's character is attacked and paralyzed by a street gang, which turns Ginty's character into a vigilante. The film was a success grossing $35 million at the box office launching Ginty's career as an action film leading man.

Moving forward, he was often cast as a sidekick to a lead character in action films and as a supporting character in serious dramas and comedies. He appeared in several low-budget films such as He Knows You're Alone (1980), The Soldier (1982) and Vigilante (1982). He also guest-starred in episodes of television series such as T.J. Hooker and E/R.

In 1984, James acted in John Sayles's critically acclaimed film science-fiction comedy The Brother from Another Planet, starring Joe Morton. With fellow thespians Darryl Edwards, Ren Woods, and Bill Cobbs, they play barflies. Reviewer Deborah Jerome of The Record said that they delivered good performances to the film. That year on television, James acted in an episode of The Dukes of Hazzard.

In 1985, he had a co-starring role alongside Michael Dudikoff in Sam Firstenberg's martial arts action film American Ninja. He reprised his role in its sequels American Ninja 2: The Confrontation (1987), and American Ninja 3: Blood Hunt (1989). He reunited with Firstenberg and Dudikoff for the 1986 action film Avenging Force.

He co-starred with Chuck Norris in The Delta Force (1986) and Hero and the Terror (1988). He also played supporting roles in the drama Mask (1985) and the sports comedy Johnny Be Good (1988).

He played Kung Fu Joe in the 1988 spoof comedy film I'm Gonna Git You Sucka and reprised his role in the television pilot Hammer, Slammer & Slade (1990).

In 1989, he played the lead in Sam Firsteberg's action film Riverbend. In it James plays a black army officer who escapes prison and ends up in small town filled with racists. The film had very limited theatrical release and didn't have any significant home video promotion.

In 1990, he took the lead role in Street Hunter directed by John A. Gallagher. With Gallagher, they wrote the screenplay, and hoped it would launch an action series. James said "I was getting a little tired of being a professional Tonto", and expressed enthusiasm to take on the lead on his own.

In 1993, he appeared in the comedy Weekend at Bernie's II. It was the last film to be released during his lifetime.

Shortly before his death from cancer in December 1993, he had completed filming the 1994 feature film Bloodfist V: Human Target with Don "The Dragon" Wilson and the pilot for the TV series M.A.N.T.I.S.. The pilot first aired on Fox just a few weeks after his death. He was going to audition to play Jax in the Mortal Kombat film; however, his death caused the studio to have Gregory McKinney replace him.

== Personal life ==
While filming The Delta Force in Tel Aviv in 1986, Jones met Israeli model Nava Halimi; she would later make a brief appearance as the girlfriend of James' character in American Ninja 2. James and Halimi married shortly after completing the movie; they had one daughter, Debbie, before divorcing. On December 26, 1992, James married actress and stuntwoman Christine Pan at the Kahala Hilton.

=== Death ===
On December 18, 1993, James died of pancreatic cancer in his home in Burbank, California at age 41.

Eulogies at James' funeral service were delivered by Sidney Poitier (as his widow, Chris, was employed by Poitier), his father Hubie James, his friend John A. Gallagher and Christine Pan James. His urn resides on the mantle of his home in Burbank, California.

== Filmography ==
=== Film ===
Year	Title	Actor	Stunts	Role	Notes
1974	The Land That Time Forgot	Yes	No	1st Sto-Lu	
1974	The Education of Sonny Carson	No	Yes	—N/a	
1978	The Wiz	No	Yes	—N/a	
1978	Oliver's Story	No	Yes	—N/a	
1979	The Warriors	Yes	Yes	Baseball Fury	
1979	The Wanderers	No	Yes	—N/a	
1980	He Knows You're Alone	Yes	Yes	Young Man	
1980	Times Square	Yes	No	Dude	Credited as 'Steve W. James'
1980	The Exterminator	Yes	Yes	Michael Jefferson	
1980	Dressed to Kill	No	Yes	—N/a	
1980	The Mouse and the Woman	Yes	No	Union Man	
1981	Arthur	Yes	Yes	Man Outside Tie Store	Uncredited
1981	Fort Apache the Bronx	No	Yes	—N/a	
1981	Wolfen	No	Yes	—N/a	
1981	Ragtime	No	Yes	—N/a	
1982	Fighting Back	No	Yes	—N/a	
1982	The Soldier	Yes	No	'Duo'	
1982	Hanky Panky	No	Yes	—N/a	
1983	Vigilante	Yes	No	Gibbons	Credited as 'Steve W. James'
1984	The Flamingo Kid	Yes	No	Renaldo	Uncredited
1984	The Brother from Another Planet	Yes	Yes	Odell	
1984	Ghostbusters	No	Yes	—N/a	
1985	Mask	Yes	No	Hospital Intern	
1985	Weird Science	Yes	Yes	Guy at Table	Uncredited
1985	American Ninja	Yes	No	Curtis Jackson	
1985	To Live and Die in L.A.	Yes	No	Jeff Rice	
1986	The Delta Force	Yes	No	Bobby	
1986	P.O.W. The Escape	Yes	No	Johnston	
1986	Avenging Force	Yes	No	Larry Richards	
1987	Hollywood Shuffle	Yes	No	Hood	Credited as 'Steve W. James'
1987	American Ninja 2: The Confrontation	Yes	No	Curtis Jackson	
1988	Johnny Be Good	Yes	No	Coach Sanders	
1988	Hero and the Terror	Yes	No	Robinson	
1988	I'm Gonna Git You Sucka	Yes	No	Kung Fu Joe	
1989	American Ninja 3: Blood Hunt	Yes	No	Curtis Jackson	
1989	Riverbend	Yes	No	Major Samuel Quentin	
1990	Mister Johnson	Yes	No	Aliu	
1990	Street Hunter	Yes	No	Logan Blade	Also screenwrier
1991	McBain	Yes	No	Eastland	
1993	Weekend at Bernie's II	Yes	No	Henry	
1994	Bloodfist V: Human Target	Yes	No	Marcus / Drew Washington	Posthumous release

=== Television ===
Year	Title	Actor	Stunts	Role	Notes
1979-80	The Doctors	Yes	No	Firefighter	5 episodes
1982	Muggable Mary, Street Cop	Yes	No	Park Assailant	Television film
1984	Glitter	Yes	No	Director	Episode: "In Tennis, Love Means Nothing"
1984	T. J. Hooker	Yes	No	Coach Cassius Isley	Episode: "Night Vigil"
1984	E/R	Yes	No	Mr. Luce	Episode: "Only a Nurse"
1984	All My Children	Yes	No	Guard Pinkston	
1984	The Dukes of Hazzard	Yes	No	Carney	Episode: "Danger on the Hazzard Express"
1984	Fatal Vision	Yes	No	US Marshal	Miniseries
1985	Hotel	Yes	No	Kaz	Episode: "Love and Honor"
1985	The Atlanta Child Murders	Yes	Yes	Policeman #1	Miniseries
1986	Moonlighting	Yes	No	Mohammed "Boogaloo" Brown	Episode: "Symphony in Knocked Flat"
1986	C.A.T. Squad	Yes	No	Bud Raines	Television film
1988	C.A.T. Squad: Python Wolf	Yes	No	Bud Raines	Television film
1989	Pee-Wee's Playhouse	Yes	No	Derek	Episode: "Rebarella"
1990	Hammer, Slammer, & Slade	Yes	No	Kung Fu Joe	Unsold pilot
1993	Raven	Yes	No	Paul Dodson	Episode: "Checkmate"
1994	M.A.N.T.I.S.	Yes	No	Antoine Pike	Television film Posthumous release
