= American Ninja =

1985 film

- Theatrical release poster
- Directed by: Sam Firstenberg
- Written by: Paul De Mielche (screenplay); Gideon Amir (story); Avi Kleinberger (story); James R. Silke (uncredited)
- Produced by: Yoram Globus; Menahem Golan
- Starring: Michael Dudikoff; Guich Koock; Judie Aronson
- Cinematography: Hanania Baer
- Edited by: Andy Horvitch; Peter Lee-Thompson; Marcus Manton; Marcel Mindlin; Daniel Wetherbee
- Music by: Michael Linn
- Production companies: Cannon Group; Golan-Globus Productions
- Distributed by: Cannon Film Distributors
- Release date: August 30, 1985
- Running time: 95 minutes
- Country: United States
- Language: English
- Budget: $1 million
- Box office: $10.5 million

American Ninja is a 1985 American martial arts action film produced by Menahem Golan and Yoram Globus's Cannon Films. Directed by Sam Firstenberg, who specialized in this genre in the 1980s, the film stars Michael Dudikoff in the title role and is the first installment in the American Ninja franchise, followed by American Ninja 2: The Confrontation (1987). It had a generally negative reception from critics, and it was a financial success at the box office and on home video.

== Plot ==
As an alternative to prison, young American Joe Armstrong is conscripted into the U.S. Army by a judge. Joe ends up fighting off the Black Star Order of ninjas while stationed in the Philippines. Following an attempted highjacking of the convoy transporting equipment. Joe and his platoon fight off the highjackers and saves the life of Patricia Hickock—daughter of Colonel William Hickock, Joe's commanding officer—But when the rest of Joe's platoon is wiped out by the Black Star ninjas, Joe's popularity with his fellow GIs takes a nosedive even as he is targeted for revenge by the Black Star Master who directs the ninja order.

While they are performing chores on the base, Corporal Curtis Jackson goads Joe into a fight. Jackson proves no match for Joe's ninjitsu expertise, which greatly impresses him and their fellow soldiers. Shortly thereafter, Jackson discovers that Joe is an amnesiac; he remembers very little of his past, other than running with various street gangs and mastering several exotic martial arts. The grateful Patricia organizes a date for herself with Joe. Jackson and another soldier, Charley Madison, sneak Joe off the base. Joe and Patricia are caught during dinner by First Sergeant Rinaldo. Rinaldo is in the middle of a meeting with black marketer Victor Ortega, whose payroll the sergeant is on. To get Joe out of the way, Rinaldo leads him to an abandoned warehouse, ostensibly for dropping off supplies. There Joe is ambushed by ninjas but defeats all of them. Then Joe's truck is stolen, and he gives chase using a motorcycle. The truck driver runs Joe off the road; thinking Joe dead, he brings the truck to Ortega.

Joe hides under the truck, and is brought to the heart of Ortega's operation, which encompasses the Black Star ninja training camp. Ortega is paying the Black Star Order for weapons stolen from the Army, which he then resells to the highest bidder. Joe is discovered but escapes with the aid of Ortega's servant Shinyuki. Returning to the base, Joe is promptly arrested by military police under Rinaldo's false accusation that Joe himself is fencing the arms. Jackson realizes that Joe has been set up, but his protests are wasted on Rinaldo. The Black Star Master infiltrates the base that night and slaughters the on-duty MPs. He then tries to kill Joe, but is thwarted by the sudden arrival of MP reinforcements, none of whom see the Black Star Master fleeing the scene. One of the dead MPs is found with a throwing star lodged in his head, further implicating Joe.

Only Jackson, Charley, and Patricia believe that Joe is innocent of the charges he now faces. They tell Hickock everything they know about the hijacking and murders, but he scoffs at their story. After briskly dismissing them, Colonel Hickock meets Rinaldo privately, revealing that the colonel himself is Ortega's accomplice. Even as Hickock orders Rinaldo to finish off Joe, the Black Star Master kidnaps Patricia since her father is becoming a less-than-reliable partner. Rinaldo attempts to run Joe off the road, only to be killed himself.

Joe returns to Ortega's mansion, where he is reunited with Shinyuki. It is revealed that Shinyuki, a former Japanese holdout soldier, adopted Joe at birth after the boy's parents died. He trained Joe in the ways of ninjitsu until a bomb blast separated the two; each has believed the other to be dead for years. Now Shinyuki completes Joe's training, and they launch a surprise attack on the Black Star training camp. Shinyuki sacrifices his life to help Joe defeat the Black Star Master; meanwhile, Hickock leads his own assault on Ortega's villa to rescue his daughter and to wipe out "loose ends" connecting him with Ortega's weapon-trafficking. Ortega flees by helicopter, with Patricia as his hostage, after gunning down her father. Joe, however, boards Ortega's chopper; he and Patricia jump to safety just before Jackson shoots down the helicopter, killing Ortega.

== Cast ==
- Michael Dudikoff as Private Joe Armstrong
- Steve James as Corporal Curtis Jackson
- Judie Aronson as Patricia Hickock
- Guich Koock as Colonel William T. Hickock
- John Fujioka as Shinyuki
- Don Stewart as Victor Ortega
- John LaMotta as 1SG Rinaldo (as John La Motta)
- Tadashi Yamashita as Black Star Ninja
- Phil Brock as Private Charley Madison
- Richard Norton as MP

== Production ==
=== Casting ===
Originally the studio wanted Chuck Norris to star. Some sources stated he did not want to have to cover up his face. Michael Dudikoff was cast, but had no martial arts experience. He was already very athletic and fight choreographer Mike Stone, who was an accomplished martial arts expert, assured the producers that Dudikoff would pick up the moves.

=== Post-production ===
The film was initially called American Warrior and was released in UK cinemas under that title, but was changed to American Ninja for all other releases. The trailer (included on the DVD) contains the original title. In Germany the film was released under the title American Fighter. It was also the first of three films pairing Michael Dudikoff and Steve James, the other two being Avenging Force (1986) and American Ninja 2: The Confrontation (1987).

== Reception ==
American Ninja received a generally negative reception from critics. On Rotten Tomatoes, the film holds an approval rating of 0% based on 7 reviews, with an average rating of 3.2/10. On Metacritic the film has a weighted average score of 20 out of 100, based on 5 critics, indicating "generally unfavorable" reviews.

== Sequels ==
The official sequels are: American Ninja 2: The Confrontation (1987), American Ninja 3: Blood Hunt (1989), American Ninja 4: The Annihilation (1990). A movie titled American Ninja V was released in 1993, starring David Bradley, but it wasn't a real American Ninja movie: its original name was American Dragons, and Bradley played an unrelated new lead character.

== In popular culture ==
- Lethal Ninja – 1992 (a semi-official entry from brothers Avi Lerner and Danny Lerner, the producers of American Ninja 2: The Confrontation, American Ninja 3: Blood Hunt, American Ninja 4: The Annihilation, and directed by American Ninja 4: The Annihilation director of photography Yossi "Joseph" Wein. Released as American Ninja 5: The Nostradamus Syndrome in South Africa.)
- American Samurai – 1992 (not a sequel, but a similarly themed film from director Sam Firstenberg)
- Featured in Red Letter Media's "Best of the Worst: Cannon Christmas in July" - Voted best of the worst by Jack Packard and Rich Evans resulting in a tie.

== See also ==
- List of American films of 1985
- List of martial arts films
- List of ninja films
