= Human shield (disambiguation) =

A human shield is the deliberate placement of non-combatants in or around combat targets to deter the enemy from attacking them.

Human shield may also refer to:

- Human shield (law)
- Human Shield (political party), a political party in Croatia
- The Human Shield, a 1991 American film
- Human shields in the Israeli-Palestinian conflict
- Use of human shields by Hamas

== See also ==
- Human chain
