= Gale Force =

- Directed by: Jim Wynorski
- Written by: Steve Latshaw
- Starring: Treat Williams
- Release date: 2002
- Country: USA
- Language: English

Gale Force is a 2002 action thriller starring Treat Williams and co-starring Michael Dudikoff, Curtis Armstrong, Susan Walters, Tim Thomerson, Marcia Strassman, and many more. It was directed by Jim Wynorski.

== Plot ==
Renegade L.A. detective Sam (Williams) takes a role as a cast member in a reality TV show where he leads a quartet trying to find ten million dollars in buried cash. But Jared (Dudikoff) secretly lands his violent militia on the island in an effort to slay the cast and steal the money. And Jared is successful: Thanks to a corrupt producer, the renegade mercenaries find the cache of cash and start off with it, but Sam and his intrepid, unarmed teammates interrupt them before they can depart. An explosion-filled chase across the island winds up with the good guys trapped by the heavily armed bad guys, and it looks like the game is over for the TV show survivors. However, Mother Nature, in the guises of a hurricane and tidal wave, has other ideas.

== Cast ==
- Treat Williams as Sam Garrett
- Michael Dudikoff as Jared
- Susan Walters as Susan Billings
- Tim Thomerson as Phillip Edwards
- Marcia Strassman as Kim Nelson
- Curtis Armstrong as Steve Chaney
- Cliff De Young as Stuart McMahon
- Gretchen Palmer as Tina Mason
- William Zabka as Rance
- Marc McClure as Moran
- Dave Hager as Whitney
- Eric James Virgets as Jeffries
- Renee Ridgeley as Julie Connors
- Bruce Nozick as Jack MacRae
- Tamara Davies as Mindi Rain
- Robert Clotworthy as Bill Cassidy

== Production ==
The film was one of the first made by Artisan Advantage, a new branch of Artisan Entertainment which sold theatrical and direct-to-video videocassette titles at low rental prices that retailers got under the prior program only by meeting goals.

== Release ==
Gale Force was released on DVD for the American Market, by Artisan Entertainment on January 15, 2002.

== Reception ==
Reviewer Scott Hettrick of the Sun-Sentinel said the film "gets off to a rousing start with an impressively staged car chase... the best part of the movie. After that, it's back to the low-budget look and patched-together feel that is typical of the movies of director Jim Wynorski... should provide modest entertainment, as long as expectations aren't too high."

== Awards ==
Gale Force received four nominations at the 2003 DVD Exclusive Awards for Best Live Action DVD Premiere Movie, Best Actor for Treat Williams, Best Director for Jim Wynorski, and Best Visual Effects.
