= Bounty Hunters (1996 film) =

- Film Poster
- Directed by: George Erschbamer
- Written by: Jim Cirile & George Erschbamer & Jeffrey Barmash
- Produced by: Jeffrey Barmash; John Dunning
- Starring: Michael Dudikoff; Lisa Howard; Ben Ratner; Erin Fitzgerald; Freddy Andreiuci
- Cinematography: A.J. Vesak
- Edited by: Mark Sanders
- Music by: Norman Orenstein
- Production companies: Cinépix Film Properties; Moonstone Entertainment; Cinevu Films; Bounty Films Production Ltd.
- Distributed by: Moonstone Entertainment; Dimension Films
- Release date: May 31, 1996; (Greece)
- Running time: 98 minutes
- Countries: United States; Canada
- Language: English

Bounty Hunters is a 1996 American-Canadian film starring Michael Dudikoff and Lisa Howard. It was directed by George Erschbamer. The film is followed by Bounty Hunters 2: Hardball.

== Plot ==
Jersey Bellini is a bounty hunter who forms an uneasy partnership with a rival to capture a fugitive

== Cast ==
- Michael Dudikoff as Jersey Bellini
- Lisa Howard as B.B.
- Ben Ratner as Deimos
- Erin Fitzgerald as Starr
- Freddy Andreiuci as Izzy
- Ashanti Williams as 'Word'
- Steve Makaj as O'Conner
- Peter LaCroix as Austraat
- Michael McMillian as Clayton
- Garry Chalk as Wasser
- Mike Mitchell as Ray Colt
- Deryl Hayes as Mr. Hervey
- Angela Moore as Mrs. Hervey
- Claire Riley as Detective Ortega
- Ken Kirzinger as Kesh
- Farhad Dordar as Laredo / Chopper #3
- Lindsay Bourne as Hector
- Alex Green as Arthur Korn
- Jim Johnston as Sergeant
- Ron Robinson as Huge Gangsta
- John Prince as A.D.
- Charles Andrew Payne as French
- George Josef as Ernesto Cabal
- Shonna Baxter as Bimbarella
- Anne Openshaw as Diner Waitress
- Tina McKinney as Bikini Babe
- Carla Elder as Babe #1
- Francine Raymor as Babe #2
- Juliet Reagh as Sexy Dancer

== Reception ==
Comeuppance Reviews gave the film three stars and stated: "Bounty Hunters has humor and inoffensive action, which should please viewers who want a break from more serious viewing.".
