= Bounty Hunters 2: Hardball =

- Film Poster
- Directed by: George Erschbamer
- Written by: John Dunning (Story); Jim Cirile and George Erschbamer & Jeffrey Barmash
- Produced by: Jeffrey Barmash; John Dunning
- Starring: Michael Dudikoff; Lisa Howard; Tony Curtis; Steve Bacic; L. Harvey Gold
- Cinematography: Brian Pearson
- Edited by: Mark Sanders
- Music by: Leon Aronson
- Production companies: Cinépix Film Properties; Moonstone Entertainment; Cinevu Films; Bounty Films Production Ltd.
- Distributed by: Buena Vista Home Video; Dimension Films
- Release dates: March 30, 1997 (Turkey); May 15, 2001 (United States)
- Running time: 92 minutes
- Countries: United States; Canada
- Language: English

Bounty Hunters 2: Hardball is a 1997 American/Canadian action film, starring Michael Dudikoff and Lisa Howard. It was directed by George Erschbamer. The film is a sequel to Bounty Hunters.

== Plot ==
Incompatible fugitive recovery agents, Jersey Bellini (Michael Dudikoff) and B.B. (Lisa Howard) are back in action again for the last time.

== Cast ==
- Michael Dudikoff as Jersey Bellini
- Lisa Howard as B.B.
- Tony Curtis as Wald
- Steve Bacic as Carlos
- L. Harvey Gold as Santos
- Pablo Coffey as Theodore Tyler
- Reese McBeth as 'Chili'
- April Telek as Fiona
- Claire Riley as Lieutenant Ortega
- Garry Chalk as Wasser
- Dale Wilson as Chuck Ramsey
- Alex Green as Bass
- Wayne Knechcel as Vassone
- Harvey Dumansky as Unger
- Robert Moloney as Celia Goffman
- Charles Andre as Bruno
- Randy Bird as Officer Jones
- Kirk Jarrett as Hitman
- Jean Ferguson as The Masseuse
- Glen Barwise as Fiancé (uncredited)

== Reception ==
Robert Pardi from TV Guide gave the film two out of four and stated: "This devil-may-care action picture makes fun of its scenario's staleness while supplying the expected action set pieces; even the tongue-in-cheek performances of the leads don't dissipate the thrills". Pardi concluded about the film: "Directed with considerable gusto, this free-for-all works both on the level of self-parody and as a genuinely exciting Mafia escapade."
