= American Samurai =

- Theatrical release poster
- Directed by: Sam Firstenberg
- Written by: John Corcoran
- Starring: David Bradley; Mark Dacascos
- Production company: Global Pictures
- Distributed by: Cannon Films
- Release dates: December 22, 1992 (Germany); March 3, 1993 (United States); November 3, 1993 (Japan)
- Running time: 87 minutes
- Country: United States
- Language: English

American Samurai is a martial-arts action film directed by Sam Firstenberg, starring David Bradley and Mark Dacascos, and produced by Cannon Films. Filmed in Turkey, it was released in the United States in 1992.

== Plot ==
Samurai master Tatsuya Sanga adopts a baby named Andrew Collins who is the only survivor of a plane crash in the Japanese mountains. Andrew and the samurai's son, Kenjiro, are trained in the warrior’s way. Andrew excels and soon surpasses his stepbrother. Kenjiro leaves his father’s home and joins the Yakuza, swearing revenge on his stepbrother. Ten years later, Andrew works in L.A. as a journalist. He and a female photographer track down an opium-smuggling operation in Turkey. The drug dealers kidnap the girl, forcing Andrew to enter a deadly, illegal weapons based martial-arts tournament whose champion is the lethal Kenjiro.

== Cast ==
- David Bradley as Andrew "Drew" Collins
  - Mariano Edelman as Drew Collins As Teenager
  - Euthymios Logothetis as Drew Collins As Baby
- Mark Dacascos as Kenjiro Sanga
  - Tal Akioshi Kitaoka as Kenjiro Sanga As Teenager
- Valarie Trapp as Janet Ward
- Rex Ryon as Ed Harrison
- Melissa Hellman as Samantha
- John Fujioka as Tatsuya Sanga
- Douvi Cohen as Stephano
- Rocky McDonald as Conan
- Ron Vreeken as McKinney
- Dion Lam as Hsing Yi / Lee
- Antony Szeto as Phan-Xu
- Melnik Dubroviko as Contestant
- Kevin Villis as Contestant
- Avi Mamn as Contestant
- Vladimir Markov as Contestant
- Mark Warren as Turk In Disco / Lars
- Koby Azarly as Turk In Disco
- Shalom Avitan as Turk In Disco
- Baruch Berkin as Hotel Clerk
- Arie Moscuna as Announcer
- Michael Morim as Police Chief
- Misha Gal as Body Guard
- John Slater as Body Guard
- Sigalit Shiry as Belly Dancer

== Home media and alternate versions ==
The DVD is available in Region 1, based on the edited R-rated cut. This version has subtitles added to the days of the tournament (i.e. "Day 2", "Day 3", etc.) Additionally, many scenes of violence or injury are zoomed in on, poorly cropped, or deleted altogether to avoid explicit details. The unrated cut has different dialogue in some scenes, no subtitles, and all of the violence is onscreen and considerably more graphic. This version is not available in the United States but can be found in other regions. There is an uncut Belgian bootleg DVD and the British version has approximately one second of footage cut.

== Reception ==
The film was described as a ”brainless action movie”, whose uncut version is somewhat more enjoyable. It was also compared unfavorably to Die Hard.

== See also ==
- List of American films of 1992
- List of martial arts films
- American Ninja (film series) from Cannon Films
