= Riverbend (film) =

- VHS cover
- Directed by: Sam Firstenberg
- Written by: Samuel Vance
- Produced by: Regina Dale; Troy Dale; Norman Stevens; Samuel Vance
- Starring: Steve James; Margaret Avery; Julius Tennon; Alex Morris; Tony Frank
- Cinematography: Ken Lamkin
- Edited by: Marcus Manton
- Music by: Paul Loomis
- Production company: Prism Entertainment Corporation
- Release date: March 29, 1990
- Running time: 101 minutes
- Country: United States
- Budget: $2 million USD

Riverbend is a 1989 American independent action-drama film directed by Sam Firstenberg. Set in the segregated South during the Civil Rights era, it stars Steve James. The film follows three Black Vietnam War soldiers who, after escaping a corrupt court-martial, arrive in a small Georgia town terrorized by a racist sheriff and lead the Black residents in an armed uprising for justice and self-determination.

Shot on location in Texas, Riverbend was independently financed and distributed on VHS by Paramount’s Prism label. A 6K restoration, produced by Reelblack Renaissance and supervised by Firstenberg and Valerie Vance premiered theatrically in 2025, followed by a Blu-ray release.

== Plot ==
Set in 1966, Riverbend opens with Major Samuel Quinton (Steve James) and fellow Black Vietnam soldiers Tony Marx (Julius Tennon) and Butch Turner (Alex Morris) being transported to face a military court-martial for disobeying an order to destroy a village filled with civilians. Knowing they will not receive a fair trial, the men escape and make their way across the South. They eventually find refuge in Riverbend, Georgia, a small segregated town ruled by a brutal sheriff (Tony Frank) and a corrupt judge.

Hiding in the home of Bell Coleman (Margaret Avery), a widowed teacher raising her son, the fugitives learn that the town’s Black residents live in fear of constant abuse and violence. Quinton convinces his men to stay and help. Using their military training, they organize and train the townspeople in secret to defend themselves and stand up to their oppressors.

When the time comes, the Black townspeople take over the town, capturing the sheriff and his deputies and demanding national attention to the injustice they’ve endured. In the end, they defeat the National Guard. The townspeople unite in the center of town in a demonstration of peace, unity and reconciliation.

Actor	Role
Steve James	Maj. Samuel Quinton
Margaret Avery	Bell Coleman
Tony Frank	Sheriff Jake
Julius Tennon	Sgt. Tony Marx
Alex Morris	Lt. Butch Turner
Tyrees Allen	Gus
Vanessa Tate	Pauline

== Production ==
The script was written by Vietnam War Veteran Samuel Vance and his wife Valerie, besed on Samuel's experiences.

Sam Firstenberg got the assignment of directing Riverbend after being approached by Texan investors which consisted of two couples one white and one black, who had no experience in the film industry. They were familiar with his work and approached him to lure actor Steve James with whom he had several collaborations.

On her casting and receiving the script Margaret Avery said, “I thought, OK, this is another Spook Who Sat by the Door, I didn’t think it was going to go very far, but it’s a great message. There were Black producers involved… 35 years ago, that was quite an accomplishment. That’s what attracted me.”

On the casting Firstenberg explained that they were only "two people from outside, Steve James and Margaret Avery. All the rest, everybody, all the rest of the cast is locally here from Texas. And by the way, this was the request of the financier."

On shooting the film Firstenberg said, "we were in the Waxahachie area. We stayed in DeSoto, Texas. That was our base. The shooting, most of the movie is in Venus, Texas, which is in this area. And I must stress the point that I have a little bit advantage here by being a foreigner, somebody who didn’t go to elementary American school or the high school. So I was able to kind of watch it. And there was no racial tension. I must say so. Maybe some underneath current that I didn’t feel, but not at all. The little town was so helpful to us. As you know, most of the cast of the movie is Black. There are very few white actors. And the crew was like 90%, 95% white persons and very few Black people in the technical crew. But I never felt any tension whatsoever here in Texas."

== Release and going to obscurity ==
Riverbend had a brief theatrical run in February 1989 before being released on VHS through Paramount’s Prism Entertainment label in 1990. On its release Firstenber said "When the movie was finished, when we finished the filming, when we finished the editing, the producers, the local producers sold it to a company in Hollywood. It was a small independent distribution company which somehow managed to give it to a bigger company, Paramount Video. And Paramount Video came out with the movie, from my understanding, with very few copies of the movie for a rental shop — at the time in the 1990s, whoever remembers, there was a rental shop in every corner of every block.I understand that there were a few screenings in the East Coast. There was none in the West Coast, I never heard about any."

It never played Cable TV or had any subsequent home video release in any format and became obscure.

== Rediscovery and restoration ==
In the early 1990s, filmmaker and Reelblack founder Michael J. Dennis said he first encountered the film while working at a Philadelphia video store but overlooked it at the time. Decades later, film historian Charles Woods reintroduced him to the title, emphasizing its significance as a story of Black resistance and self-determination. When Dennis later uploaded the film to his Reelblack YouTube channel, it attracted renewed attention and in 2021 even a note of appreciation from director Sam Firstenberg, sparking the idea to pursue a restoration.

On discovering a 35mm print in South Africa Dennis added: "Yeah, Sam and I, we started talking, like I said, I thought it was going to be cease and desist. We started talking and this magical thing happened: A print, a 35mm print, shows up on eBay while we’re having conversations.So I said well, let me bid on it and see, you know, because it seemed like it would be incredibly rare. Like it might be the only print that exists outside the Library of Congress. So I won the print, we went about restoring that print and then we found out it was missing seven minutes."

Dennis began what he called the film’s first “grindhouse restoration.” The heavily worn reels were scanned in 2K and digitally cleaned by preservationist Craig Rogers of Deaf Crocodile, with missing footage replaced using VHS material under Firstenberg’s supervision. This version premiered at the 2024 Denton Black Film Festival in Texas. It marked the film’s first public screening in more than three decades. The event reunited surviving members of the cast and crew.

Dennis explained that upon meeting producer Valerie Vance she claimed to have a complete 35 mm print of the film and said "she had a mold issue. So we’re back to square one

Dennis also added that he met "Dennis Doros at Missing Movies, he was able locate the negative of the film." Doros discovered the original negative stored at FotoKem in Los Angeles. With the assistance of Valerie Vance, Dennis cleared the rights cleared and materials secured from Amazon/MGM, and launched a full 6K restoration through his label Reelblack Renaissance, in collaboration with preservationist Austin Squitieri of Reel Revival and with supervision by Firstenberg. Dennis also crowdfund $20,000 on Kickstarter for the restoration. The restored version premiered on October 14, 2025, at the Aero Theatre in Santa Monica, followed by a June 19, 2026 Blu-ray release.
