= The Silencer =

2000 action film by Robert Lee

- Directed by: Robert Lee
- Written by: John Curtis
- Produced by: Evan Tylor; John Curtis; Melanie Kilgour (associate producer); David W.G. MacKenzie (executive producer); Gary Howsam (executive producer); Petros Tsaparas (executive producer)
- Starring: Michael Dudikoff; Brennan Elliott; Terence Kelly; Gabrielle Miller
- Cinematography: Henry M. Lebo
- Music by: Peter Allen
- Distributed by: Trimark
- Release date: September 26, 2000
- Running time: 92 minutes
- Language: English

The Silencer is a 2000 action film directed by Robert Lee and starring Michael Dudikoff as a professional assassin hired to train a young man who may not be all he seems.
