= Juliet Reagh =

American actress and model (born 1964)

- Born: September 5, 1964 (age 60)
- Occupation(s): Actress and model
- Known for: Penthouse Pet for April 1987
- Notable work: Futuresport, Bounty Hunters, Bordello of Blood

Juliet Reagh (born September 5, 1964) is an American actress and model. She was the Penthouse Pet for April 1987 under the name "Jenna Persaud".

== Life and career ==
Reagh is from Trinidad and of Indian descent. In April 1987, she was the Pet of the Month for an issue of Penthouse, and, in 1989, Reagh was the Pet of the Year Runner-Up. She appeared in a number of films made in the 1990s.

== Partial filmography ==
- 1998 Futuresport
- 1996 Bounty Hunters
- 1996 Bordello of Blood
- 1992 The Other Woman
