= The Shooter (1997 film) =

1997 Western film

- Film poster
- Directed by: Fred Olen Ray (as Ed Raymond)
- Written by: Tony Giglio
- Produced by: Ashok Amritraj; Andrew Stevens
- Starring: Michael Dudikoff; Randy Travis; Valerie Wildman; Eric Lawson; Robert Donavan; William Smith; Andrew Stevens
- Narrated by: Andrew Stevens
- Cinematography: Gary Graver
- Edited by: Brett Hedlund
- Music by: Deeji Mincey; Boris Zelkin
- Release date: 1997
- Running time: 91 minutes
- Country: United States
- Language: English

The Shooter (also known as Deadly Shooter and Desert Shooter) is a 1997 American Western film directed by Fred Olen Ray (credited as Ed Raymond) and starring Michael Dudikoff.

== Plot ==
Michael Atherton stands up to the unfriendly and controlling family that runs the small, western town he lives in and ends up unheroically beaten up and left for dead. By luck, he is saved by a prostitute attacked by the same group of desperados.

== Cast ==
- Michael Dudikoff as Michael Atherton
- Randy Travis as Kyle Tapert
- Valerie Wildman as Wendy
- Andrew Stevens as Jacob Finch / The Narrator
- William Smith as Jerry Krants
- Robert Donavan as Mayor Pete Sayers
- Eric Lawson as Paul
- Hoke Howell as Duncan
- Libby George as Gina
- Cal Bartlett as Sheriff
