= Cyberjack (film) =

1995 film by Robert Lee

- Film poster
- Directed by: Robert Lee
- Screenplay by: Eric Poppen
- Produced by: Barry L. Collier (executive); John A. Curtis (executive); Masao Takiyama (executive); Robert H. Straight (co-producer); James Thom (associate)
- Starring: Michael Dudikoff; Brion James; Suki Kaiser; Johnny Cuthbert; James Thom
- Cinematography: Alan M. Trow
- Edited by: Derek Whelan
- Music by: George Blondheim
- Production companies: Everest Pictures; Fuji Eight Company; Prism Entertainment; Catalyst Films International
- Distributed by: SPO Entertainment (Japan); Alliance Entertainment (Canada); Turner Home Entertainment (U.S.)
- Release dates: August 4, 1995 (Japan); September 19, 1995 (Canada; United States)
- Running time: 98 minutes
- Country: Canada
- Language: English
- Budget: $2 million

Cyberjack (Japanese: サイバー・ジャック) is a 1995 Canadian–Japanese science-fiction action film directed by Robert Lee, starring Michael Dudikoff, Brion James and Suki Kaiser. Dudikoff stars as a traumatized cop turned janitor trying to stop a violent anarchist terrorist from injecting himself with a revolutionary techno-organic virus, which would make him all-powerful. For its North American video release, the film was retitled Virtual Assassin.

== Plot ==
Haunted by memories of the murder of his partner by anarchist terrorist Nassim, former policeman Nick James has become a debt-ridden shell of his former self, and works as a janitor for computer science firm Quantum. Quantum's top research team is led by the father–daughter team of Phillip and Alex Royce, who are on the verge of a groundbreaking discovery: a computer virus that has been injected with organic components to become a highly efficient anti-hacking "vaccine", capable of protecting the world's computer networks with an unparalleled degree of intelligence. However, despite the reticence of Quantum's boss Neil Jervis, Alex insists that the program is highly unstable and not ready for commercial release. This is confirmed when it escapes the company's mainframe and invades the city's transportation system, causing one of its SkyBus shuttles to crash into a skyscraper with its passengers.

Showing no regard for the risks, Nassim takes over the Quantum headquarters with a heavily armed commando unit, killing several high-ranking officers including Jervis and Alex's father. He then demands to be injected with the virus, which he hopes will grant him the ability to control all of the world's computer infrastructures. James, who has escaped the attack, is Alex's only hope on the inside. Meanwhile, the police has gathered outside the building and activated its "Cyclop" sentry bots, but these make little difference between James and the terrorists.

== Cast ==
- Michael Dudikoff as Nick James
- Brion James as Nassim
- Suki Kaiser as Dr. Alex Royce
- Johnny Cuthbert as Devon
- James Thom as Travis
- Topaz Hasfal-Schou as Meghan
- Garvin Cross as Numb
- Dean McKenzie as Reef
- Duncan Fraser as Dr. Phillip Royce
- Hiro Kanagawa as Kenji
- Alvin Sanders as John
- Jerry Wasserman as Neil Jervis
- Terry Barclay as Horning
- Art Irizawa as Oshiga

== Production ==
Cyberjack was the first production of Everest Entertainment, a new company co-founded by Crackerjack producer John A. Curtis after his exit from North American Releasing, and transposed the same formula to a futuristic setting. Christian Bruyere, until then best known for subsidized, human interest movies, provided production services via his Catalyst Films International outfit. The film marked the directorial debut Chilliwack-raised Robert Lee, who had previously served in an assistant capacity on a pair of NAR science fiction films, Project Shadowchaser and Time Runner, the later of which also featured Brion James.

Local press listed filming starting on August 29, 1994. The film was shot in Vancouver, British Columbia, and the city's Harbor Centre district was enhanced with CGI to give it the requisite cyberpunk look. It features a "SkyBus", a sci-fi reimagining of the city's iconic SeaBus water taxis. Like several locally filmed projects, the film's weaponry reused the futuristic Beretta design created by Syd Mead for the B.C.-shot Timecop. Star Michael Dudikoff received an injury during the shoot, when he was accidentally struck in the eye by a stuntperson. The film had a budget of $2 million.

=== Visual effects ===
The visual effects were done by British company The Magic Camera. CGI supervisor Alan Marques went through three different software suites, including market leader Wavefront, whose glossy images did not mesh with the real world footage. Eventually, it was decided to use LightWave 3D, a program for the Amiga. The lead computer was an Amiga 4000/040 with a Warp Engine accelerator card and 146 megabytes of RAM. The rendering process originally took one hour per frame, before a friend working for Team 17 recommended connecting it to a Raptor Plus rendering engine. This reduced times to about four minutes per frame.

The SkyBus consisted of 15,000 polygons and 46 light sources. Its integration into the miniature streets during the remote hijack scene took one month to process. Some objects were rendered at half resolution and then blown up to 2048p, which gave them a softer, more film-like look. The team continued using the Amiga for its next film project, the James Bond film GoldenEye.

== Release ==
=== Pre-release ===
Post production was scheduled to wrap up in time for a screening at the American Film Market on February 25, 1995. It was shown to Canadian cast and crew at Vancouver's Vogue theater on March 28, 1995. Curtis and his Everest Entertainment partner Robert Straight also traveled to promote the film at the May 1995 Cannes Film Market.

=== Home media ===
The film was released in the co-producing country of Japan before North America, where it retained the title of Cyberjack. Although no release date could be sourced from domestic film databases, some retailers list the VHS street date as August 4, 1995, with a LaserDisc version following on August 21, 1995, both from distributor SPO Entertainment. The DVD was released on September 7, 2001, again by SPO.

In both Canada and the U.S., the film was released on VHS on September 19, 1995, and retitled Virtual Assassin. In Canada, it was distributed by Alliance Entertainment. In the U.S., it was distributed by executive producer Barry Collier's Prism Pictures through Turner Home Entertainment. Prism also released a LaserDisc in cooperation with disc-based media specialist Image Entertainment on November 1, 1995.

=== Festival ===
The film was featured at the 1995 Vancouver International Film Festival, for whom Straight had previously worked, under its original title Cyberjack. It was first shown on September 29 in a midnight screening as part of the "Walk on the Wild Side" selection, an equivalent to Toronto's popular Midnight Madness program. A second, daytime screening took place on October 2.

=== Television ===
By the time it premiered on U.S. TV on the Sci-Fi Channel, the film had reverted to its original title of Cyberjack. It was later featured on the June 24, 2000, episode of the TNT B-movie show MonsterVision hosted by Joe Bob Briggs.

== Reception ==
Cyberjack received mixed to negative reviews. Writing in trade publication Variety, Ken Eisner assessed that "the set-in-the-near-future saga looks way better than its $2 million budget, thanks to nifty special effects and solid set design. Unfortunately, it shoots its visual wad in the first third [...] and the rest settles into routine cat-and-mouse stuff, mostly in a single set. TV Guide assessed that "[t]his futuristic terrorist thriller contains some empty but entertaining plot twists, and an assortment of memorably nasty villains." Gerald Pratley, author of A Century of Canadian Cinema found it "a well done formula film disguised with special effects"

Less impressed was British critic John Elliot who, in his Guide to Home Entertainment, deemed the film "a dull and derivative Die Hard clone". Howard Maxford, author of The A–Z of Science Fiction & Fantasy Films, dismissed it as "little more than a low rent variation on Die Hard, with none of that film's energy." Writing in VideoHound's Sci-Fci Experience, Carol A. Schwartz found that its "inanity wastes some decent f/x and cool gadgets, including a police robot who's a neat riff on RoboCop's ED-209".

== Aftermath ==
According to Robert Lee, the trailer for Cyberjack had so impressed Tom Berenger, for whom he worked as assistant director on another film, that the star had booked him to direct his upcoming production, a British medieval fantasy called Pendragon. However, that project did not materialize. Instead, Lee's next directorial effort was a loose sequel to Crackerjack for prior employer North American Pictures, which was released on October 28, 1996.

=== Video game ===
After falling on hard times during the making of its next film Laserhawk, the embattled Everest Entertainment was taken over by the owner of Vancouver-based video game studio Motion Works, which itself would disappear soon after. Before its demise, Motion Works attempted to monetize the Cyberjack IP by adapting it into a Myst-like point & click adventure game, which used additional views of Vancouver to flesh out the film's world. It was sold on the company's website through the then popular shareware model.
