= Fugitive Mind =

- The DVD cover
- Directed by: Fred Olen Ray
- Written by: Sean McGinly; Tripp Reed
- Produced by: Fred Olen Ray; Andrew Stevens
- Starring: Michael Dudikoff; Heather Langenkamp; Michele Greene; David Hedison
- Cinematography: Theo Angell
- Edited by: Michael Kuge
- Music by: Jay Bolton; David Wurst; Eric Wurst
- Release dates: March 24, 1999 (Greece); September 14, 1999 (United States)
- Running time: 94 minutes
- Country: USA
- Language: English

Fugitive Mind is a 1999 American sci-fi action film directed by Fred Olen Ray and starring Michael Dudikoff and Heather Langenkamp.

== Plot ==
A man finds out that he was brainwashed to kill an important government official.

== Cast ==
- Michael Dudikoff as Robert Dean
- Heather Langenkamp as Suzanne Hicks
- Michele Greene as Robyn
- David Hedison as Senator Davis
- Ian Ogilvy as Dr. Grace
- Judson Earney Scott as Karns
- Chick Vennera as Jimmy Morabito
- Gabriel Dell as Tucker Foley
- John Putch as Dave Bayne
- Barry Newman as Dr. Chamberlain
- Gil Gerard as Karl Gardner

== Release ==
The film had a direct-to-video release in 1999.

== Reception ==
The film has been met with generally mixed reviews. Keith Baley of Radio Times criticized the storyline and the pacing of the film stating, "Plagued by nightmares and flashbacks to events he cannot remember, Michael Dudikoff takes much longer than the audience to realise he's not who he thinks he is, and even longer to find out he's the key element of a planned assassination in this Total Recall inspired thriller. Suspect Device did something similar to this four years earlier (even using one of the same key locations), and at least did it with some zip and crowd-pleasing action. Though director Fred Olen Ray makes this look better than his usual efforts, it's an endless talkfest that becomes as numbing as the many faces that get punched in the course of the movie - which is about as exciting as the action gets."

The film was described as "plain boring". while a review at TV Guide stated, "Once again, Dudikoff shows savvier taste in material than his martial arts contemporaries. Even if the script defies logic once too often, the personable Dudikoff enlists our sympathy for the hero's waking nightmare. Another asset is the film's collection of quietly menacing mad scientists, who make the far-fetched storyline seem all too plausible."
