= Valerie Wildman =

American actress and humanitarian

- Born: Valerie June Wildman; August 6, 1953 (age 73); Miami Beach, Florida, U.S.
- Occupation: Actress
- Years active: 1983–present

Valerie June Wildman (born August 6, 1953) is an American actress and humanitarian.

== Early life ==
Wildman was born in Miami Beach, to Leslie Ames, a Ford model and the first "Revlon" girl.

Wildman holds a master's degree in Counseling and is pursuing a Psy.D. in Clinical Psychology at Meridian University.

== Film career ==
Valerie Wildman’s first major film appearance was in Oliver Stone’s critically acclaimed Salvador, in which she played provocative journalist Pauline Axelrod. She has appeared and starred in numerous films and television shows, including 11 years on Days of Our Lives in the role of Fay Walker and the recurring role of Christine Petit on Beverly Hills, 90210.

== Filmography ==
=== Film ===
Year	Title	Role	Notes
1984	Splash	Wedding Guest	
1985	The Falcon and the Snowman	U.S. Embassy Official	
1986	Salvador	Pauline Axelrod	
1986	A Fine Mess	Anchorwoman	
1987	Beverly Hills Cop II	Gun Club Receptionist	
1990	Internal Affairs	May	
1991	Inner Sanctum	Jennifer Reed	
1991	Neon City	Sandy Randall	
1996	Mars Attacks!	GNN Reporter #2	
1997	The Shooter	Wendy	
2000	Cast Away	Virginia Larson	
2008	Disaster Movie	Samantha Jones	
2014	Earth to Echo	Christine Hastings	

=== Television ===
Year	Title	Role	Notes
1983	St. Elsewhere	Woman In Bar	Episode: "Ties That Bind"
1985	Matt Houston	Beth Thompson	Episode: "The Beach Club Murders"
1986	The A-Team	Sally Vogel	Episode: "Alive at Five"
1987	My Sister Sam	Sara	Episode: "And They Said It Would Never Last "
1987	Hunter	Laura Ormond	Episode: "Turning Point"
1988	The Magical World of Disney	Woman In Black	Episode: "Justin Black"
1988	Down Delaware Road	Ann Heller	Television film
1988	Deadline: Madrid	Christine Martin	Television film
1988	Break of Dawn	Julia Voitek	Television film
1989	Jake and the Fatman	Randy Flowers	Episode: "Snowfall"
1989	Hardball	Joyce Ackerman	Episode: "The Silver Scream"
1989	Monsters	Jacqueline	Episode: "Half as Old as Time"
1990	Freddy's Nightmares	Evelyn Hall	Episode: "Funhouse"
1991-1992	Dangerous Women	Patricia Meadows / Faith Cronin	17 episodes
1992	Dark Justice	Jill	Episode: "Teenage Pajama Party Massacre: Part 1V"
1993	Tales from the Crypt	Woman At Restaurant	Episode: "Came the Dawn"
1994	Murder, She Wrote	Diane Weaver	Episode: "Proof in the Pudding"
1994	Silk Stalkings	Caroline Krane	Episode: "Ask the Dust"
1995	Indictment: The McMartin Trial	Diana Sullivan	Television film
1995	Fast Company	Carrie Pendleton	Television film
1996	Walker, Texas Ranger	Teri Lansing	Episode: "El Coyote: Part 2"
1996	Baywatch Nights	Doris Jennings	Episode: "Backup"
1996	High Incident		Episode: "Nobody Walks in El Camino"
1996	Moloney	Nancy Louds	Episode: "Night of the Gardenia"
1997	Tracey Takes On...	Anna	Episode: "1976"
1997	Skeletons	Belinda	Television film
1997	Chicago Hope	Carolyn Hunter	Episode: "Positive I.D.s"
1997	Fired Up	Silvia	Episode: "Are We Not Friends?"
1998	Star Trek: Voyager	Nevala	Episode: "Message in a Bottle"
1998	Air America	Elisa McCarran	Episode: "The Miracle"
1992-2000	Beverly Hills, 90210	Christine Pettit	8 episodes
2001	Spirit	Marjorie	Television film
2003	Nip/Tuck	Shelly Edwards	Episode: "Kurt Dempsey"
2003	Mystery Woman	Janet Sinclair	Television film
2005	CSI: Crime Scene Investigation	Donna Eiger's Friend	Episode: "King Baby"
2006	Cold Case	Landon In 2006	Episode: "Debut"
2006	Without a Trace	Staci Newman	Episode: "The Stranger"
2009	General Hospital	Deirdre Evans	2 episodes
1999-2011	Days of Our Lives	Fay Walker	121 episodes
2011	The Mentalist	Sheryl	Episode: "The Redshirt"
2013	NCIS	Valerie Kordish	Episode: "Detour"
2013	Hunt for the Labyrinth Killer	Beth Harrington	Television film
2013-2014	Venice: The Series	Nurse	12 episodes
2016	Roadside Stars	Bea	Television film
2023	Bel-Air	Cora	Episode: "Pursuit of Happiness"
2024	Clipped	Sharon	2 episodes

=== Video games ===
Year	Title	Role	Notes
1997	Star Wars Jedi Knight: Dark Forces II	Sariss	
