= Midnight Ride (film) =

- Directed by: Bob Bralver
- Written by: Russell V. Manzatt; Bob Bralver
- Produced by: Ovidio G. Assonitis
- Starring: Michael Dudikoff; Mark Hamill; Savina Geršak; Robert Mitchum
- Cinematography: Roberto D'Ettorre Piazzoli
- Edited by: Claudio M. Cutry
- Music by: Carlo Maria Cordio
- Production company: Cannon Pictures Inc.
- Distributed by: Cannon Pictures Inc.
- Release date: July 20, 1990
- Running time: 93 minutes
- Country: United States
- Language: English

Midnight Ride is a 1990 American action thriller-slasher film directed by Bob Bralver. It stars Michael Dudikoff, Mark Hamill, Savina Geršak, and Robert Mitchum.

== Plot ==
After a heated argument with her military police turned cop husband, Lawson (Michael Dudikoff); Russian immigrant house wife, Lara (Savina Geršak) storms off into the night convinced he's more married to his job than her. On her drive to a friend's house, she takes pity on a mournful hitchhiker Justin Mckay (Mark Hamill), desperately searching for a ride. Her offer of a lift to him plunges her into a night of pure terror as Justin is seriously disturbed, twisted by a tortured childhood which ended in being made to see his little sister's shocking murder and mutilation at the hands of his brutal alcoholic mother (who took a butcher knife to her head and used it like a comb) who systematically slays anyone who harms or offends him on a murderous impulse, as he captures their dying moments on his Polaroid camera.

As Lawson struggles to follow Lara despite a leg in a cast, he is left for dead by Justin, but recovers and now must search the steadily darkening roads for Lara, while her deeply troubled and psychopathic captor Justin continues his uncontrollable slaughter-spree, rampaging through the night leaving behind carnage and fiery devastation on his path of madness. As soon as Justin and Lara reach the hospital, Justin pretends Lara is paranoid and soon encounter Dr. Hardy, Justin's doctor who tried to help Justin when he first met him. While Lawson arrives at the hospital, Justin forces Dr. Hardy to give Lara the treatment of electric shocks. As much as Dr. Hardy tries to persuade Justin not to, he ignores him and gives Lara electric shocks, thus trying to kill her. Lawson comes right out of a ventilation shaft into the room stopping Justin from his insane doing and pursues him down to the engineers room tackling Justin down and throwing him right into a current, electrifying him to death.

Lawson and Lara in the end head to an elevator, where Lawson forgives Lara and says that she is more important than his work. Not realizing that Justin had survived the incident and secretly dressed up as a patient, and now is in the elevator with them. When he is able to, Justin uses his knife to try to kill them both, but Lawson grabs his gun and shoots Justin directly in the head, thus killing him for definite.

== Cast ==
- Michael Dudikoff as Lawson, Lara's Husband
- Mark Hamill as Justin McKay
- Savina Geršak as Lara, Lawson's Wife
- Robert Mitchum as Dr. Hardy
- Pamela Ludwig as Rental Agent
- Timothy Brown as Jordan
- Lezlie Deane as Joan
- Steve Ingrassia as Man With Joan
- Cynthia Szigeti as Mrs. Egan
- Dee Dee Rescher as The Receptionist
- R. A. Rondell as Officer Baker
- Mark A. Pierce as Policeman

== Release ==
The film was released on July 20, 1990 in the United States.
