= American Ninja 2: The Confrontation =

1987 film

- Theatrical release poster
- Directed by: Sam Firstenberg
- Screenplay by: James Booth; Gary Conway
- Story by: Gary Conway
- Produced by: Menahem Golan; Yoram Globus
- Starring: Michael Dudikoff; Steve James; Larry Poindexter; Gary Conway
- Cinematography: Gideon Porath
- Edited by: Michael J. Duthie
- Music by: George S. Clinton
- Production company: Cannon Films
- Distributed by: Cannon Releasing Corporation
- Release date: May 1, 1987
- Running time: 90 minutes
- Country: United States
- Language: English
- Budget: $350,000
- Box office: $4 million

American Ninja 2: The Confrontation is a 1987 American martial arts action film directed by Sam Firstenberg. A sequel to American Ninja (1985), it is the second installment in the American Ninja franchise, followed by American Ninja 3: Blood Hunt (1989). It stars Michael Dudikoff, Steve James, Jeff Weston, Gary Conway, Michelle Botes and Larry Poindexter. The film was less successful than its predecessor, grossing $4 million domestically in the U.S. versus $10.5 million, but it developed a cult following.

== Plot ==
On a remote Caribbean island, US Army Rangers Joe Armstrong and Curtis Jackson investigate the disappearance of several Marines. They soon discover that the disappearances are the work of a drug lord called "The Lion". The Lion has also kidnapped a local scientist and is using his research to engineer a private army of "super-ninjas" from the genetic code of the kidnapped Marines, turning them into brainwashed killing machines. Joe and Curtis must work with Alicia Sanborn, the kidnapped scientist's daughter, to stop The Lion. They infiltrate The Lion's base on Blackbeard Island, where Joe battles The Lion's head ninja while Curtis leads an attack with the local Marines.

== Cast ==
- Michael Dudikoff as Sergeant Joe Armstrong
- Steve James as Sergeant Curtis Jackson
- Jeff Weston as Captain Bill "Wild Bill" Woodward
- Gary Conway as Leo Burke, aka The Lion
- Michelle Botes as Alicia Sanborn
- Larry Poindexter as Sergeant Charlie McDonald
- Mike Stone as Tojo Ken
- Jonathan Pienaar as Taylor

== Production ==
Principal photography began on October 27, 1986 in South Africa under the title American Ninja 2. By November 1986 the production was filming in Johannesburg, Cape Town and Mauritius.

== Reception ==
=== Box office ===
The film opened on May 1, 1987, distributed by Cannon Releasing Corporation. The film earned $1,850,351 in its first ten days of release, playing on 398 screens.

=== Critical response ===
Johanna Steinmetz of the Chicago Tribune stated that the film was a "shameless steal" of the film Dr. No (1962) and Star Wars (1977), for instance when "Joe conjures up Shinyuki for a little moral support, much the way Luke Skywalker communed with Obiwan Kenobi". The review praised Sam Firstenberg action scenes, noting that he "lavishes such care on the shooting and editing of fight scenes ("Lethal Weapon's" Richard Donner could learn plenty by watching these)."

On Metacritic the film has a weighted average score of 39 out of 100, based on 5 critics, indicating "generally unfavorable" reviews.

In his book Horror and Science Fiction Film IV, Donald C. Willis dismissed the film noting "lackluster stunt work-lots of shots of bodies falling onto breakaway tables."

== Sequel ==
A sequel titled American Ninja 3: Blood Hunt, was released in 1989.

== See also ==
- List of American films of 1987
- List of martial arts films
