= Quicksand (2002 film) =

- Directed by: Sam Firstenberg
- Written by: Steve Schoenberg; Ruben Gordon
- Produced by: Frank DeMartini; Rafael Primorac
- Starring: Michael Dudikoff; Brooke Theiss; Richard Kind; Dan Hedaya
- Cinematography: Sameer Reddy
- Edited by: Alison Learned
- Music by: Curt Harpel
- Distributed by: Quantum Entertainment; New Concorde (United States); Cinema Club (UK)
- Release date: March 15, 2002
- Running time: 92 minutes
- Countries: United States; India
- Language: English

Quicksand is a 2002 action film that was released direct-to-video in March 2002 after a short initial run in theatres in Los Angeles in March 2002. The film stars Michael Dudikoff, Brooke Theiss, Richard Kind and Dan Hedaya. In United Kingdom the film was released on DVD in August 2003. The film is directed by Sam Firstenberg.

== Plot ==
When military psychiatrist Bill Turner (Michael Dudikoff) falls for a general's daughter, a dark conspiracy threatens to swallow up everyone involved. Turner's relationship with his new patient, Marine sergeant Randi Stewart (Brooke Theiss), begins to reach well beyond the typical doctor/patient bond, as he soon discovers that she is involved in a far-stretching political conspiracy but can't tell if she is the victim or the perpetrator. Randi's brother, Gordon Stewart is running for political office when their father General Stewart (Dan Hedaya) is murdered and Randi becomes the main suspect. When Turner's feelings toward Randi grow he has to deal with her being a possible murderer. But Turner would more than anything not find out, which leads him getting sucked deeper and deeper into the "Quicksand".

== Cast ==
- Michael Dudikoff as Bill Turner
- Brooke Theiss as Randi Stewart
- Douglas Weston as Gordon Stewart
- Richard Kind as Kensington
- Dan Hedaya as General Stewart
- Michael O'Hagan as Dr. Fuller
- Pamela Salem as Peggy
- Marisa Johnston as Samantha (as Marisa Morell)
- Sameer Dharmadhikari as Handsome Private (as Sameer Dharmadikari)
- Asif Basra as Airman
- Lalith Sharma as Bartender
