= Avenging Force =

1986 American action film

- Theatrical release poster
- Directed by: Sam Firstenberg
- Written by: James Booth
- Produced by: Yoram Globus; Menahem Golan
- Starring: Michael Dudikoff; Steve James; Bill Wallace; John P. Ryan
- Cinematography: Gideon Porath
- Edited by: Michael J. Duthie
- Music by: George S. Clinton
- Production companies: Cannon Films; Golan-Globus Productions
- Release date: September 12, 1986
- Running time: 103 minutes
- Country: United States
- Language: English
- Box office: $4.7 million (U.S. Collection)

Avenging Force is a 1986 American action film directed by Sam Firstenberg. The screenplay was written by James Booth, who co-starred in the film. It was originally intended as a sequel to the 1985 film Invasion U.S.A., which starred Chuck Norris as Matt Hunter. In Avenging Force, Hunter (played by Michael Dudikoff) faces off against a group of far-right extremists known as the Pentangle. The film made $4.7 million at the boxoffice but it gain cult success on home media and since then it's considered a cult film.

== Plot ==
Former US Secret Service agent Captain Matt Hunter has retired to his family's ranch in Louisiana and Texas, with his sister Sarah and grandfather. They drive to New Orleans and meet Matt's old military comrade and local politician Larry Richards. Larry, Matt and their families ride in Larry's float in the Mardi Gras parade. Disguised as revelers, assassins open fire on Larry's float, killing his eldest son.

Matt calls his old boss, Admiral Brown, and learns that the perpetrators are members of a far-right group known as the Pentangle, suspected of operating a hunting club targeting people. The Secret Service asks Matt to infiltrate the organization. Matt declines because of his family, but he sends his and Larry's families to hide out at his ranch.

Professor Elliott Glastenbury is the head of Glastenbury Industries and the leader of the Pentangle. Learning that the families are hiding out at Matt's ranch, Glastenbury orders Pentangle members Delaney, Wallace, and Lavall to attack the ranch, kill the Secret Service agents and Matt's grandfather, and set the ranch ablaze. Matt, Sarah, and Larry's wife all escape, and Larry goes back to rescue his youngest son but is shot in the process. Larry asks Matt to protect his son and dies. Meanwhile, Sarah is taken hostage.

The Pentangle gives Matt two weeks to agree to be hunted, or they will kill Sarah. Two weeks later, Matt shows up at a Pentangle Cajun bayou party. Matt rescues Sarah and escapes into the swamps on foot. The Pentangle hunts him throughout the night, but one by one, Matt eliminates Lavall, Wallace, and Delaney until only Glastenbury remains. Ambushed by Glastenbury, Matt stabs him, which allows both men time to escape.

Matt then confronts Glastenbury at his mansion. They duel with Glastenbury's collection of antique weaponry. Glastenbury appears to have the upper hand, but Matt impales him on one of his own statues and kills him. Matt goes to the hospital to see Sarah, where Brown congratulates him on a job well done. Matt confronts him that only the Secret Service knew that the families were hiding out on Matt's ranch, implying that Brown is the unnamed fifth member of the Pentangle. Matt vows to continue fighting the Pentangle.

== Cast ==
- Michael Dudikoff as Captain Matt Hunter
- Steve James as Larry Richards
- James Booth as Admiral Brown
- Bill Wallace as Wade Delaney
- John P. Ryan as Professor Elliott Glastenbury
- Karl Johnson as Commander Jeb Wallace
- Marc Alaimo as Charles Lavall
- Allison Gereighty as Sarah Hunter

== Release ==
=== Theatrical ===
Avenging Force received a theatrical release in the United States on September 12, 1986, opening at the RKO National Twin in New York City, New York, and other theaters.

=== Home media ===
Avenging Force was released on VHS and Betamax by Media Home Entertainment. In 2014, the film was released on DVD and Blu-ray in the US by Kino Lorber.

== Reception ==
=== Critical response ===
Nina Darnton, in her review of the film for The New York Times, wrote, "The heros themselves, the movie tirelessly points out, are kind men with strict codes of honor and intense personal loyalties. [...] The enemy is unambiguously bad. These kinds of movies are not strong on subtlety." She compared Dudikoff to "a young Clint Eastwood, though Mr. Dudikoff, a former Adidas model, is more agile than Dirty Harry ever was." The Washington Post's Paul Attanasio also noted a perceived lack of subtlety in the film, and wrote that its action sequences are "orchestrated by director Sam (Doctor Ninja) Firstenberg with his usual panache."
