= Rolling Vengeance =

1987 Canadian exploitation film

- Promotional release poster
- Directed by: Steven Hilliard Stern
- Screenplay by: Michael Thomas Montgomery
- Produced by: Steven Hilliard Stern; Jack E. Freedman
- Starring: Don Michael Paul; Lawrence Dane; Ned Beatty; Lisa Howard
- Cinematography: Laszlo George
- Edited by: Ron Wisman
- Music by: Phil Marshall
- Production company: Apollo Pictures
- Distributed by: Apollo Pictures (North America); Manson International Pictures (International)
- Release date: October 2, 1987
- Running time: 90 minutes
- Country: Canada
- Language: English

Rolling Vengeance, also known as Monster Truck, is a 1987 Canadian exploitation film directed by Steven Hilliard Stern and starring Don Michael Paul and Ned Beatty. The movie follows a truck driver who builds a special, eight-ton truck to help get revenge against the rednecks who killed his family and raped his girlfriend. The film script's initial premise centred on a young boy who created special monster trucks in order to eliminate drunk drivers.

== Plot ==
The five drunken sons of influential local business owner Tiny Doyle have been terrorizing the streets of their small town in their pick-up truck.

Local trucker Big Joe Rosso has a wife named Kathy, a son named Joey, and two young daughters named Allison and Kristin. Big Joe and Joey do business with Tiny, delivering liquor to his bar, but that does not stop Tiny's son Vic from driving drunk and running Kathy off the road, killing her, Allison, and Kristin. Thanks to Tiny's influence, the local judge sets Vic free after ordering Vic to pay a $300 fine. Lieutenant Sly, one of the local cops, is sympathetic toward the Rosso family, but Sly is about to retire, and Tiny has a lot of clout in this town.

Enraged and bereaved, Big Joe goes after Vic, but Tiny and his five sons kill Big Joe. Afterwards, they gang rape Joey's girlfriend, Misty. Enraged and frustrated, Joey builds a monster truck out of junked car and truck parts, with seven-foot tall tires, a flame thrower, and a giant retractable combination drill and metal cutter mounted on it. Joey is out to do what the local authorities cannot or will not do: put an end to the Doyles once and for all.

== Cast ==
- Don Michael Paul as Joey Rosso
- Lawrence Dane as Big Joe Rosso
- Ned Beatty as Tiny Doyle
- Lisa Howard as Misty
- Todd Duckworth as Vic Doyle
- Michael J. Reynolds as Lt. Sly Sullivan
- Michael Kirby as Mahoney
- Michael Dyson as Moon Man
- Hugo Dann as Hairlip
- Lawrence King-Phillips as Finger
- Alan C. Peterson as Four Eyes
- Barclay Hope as Steve Tyler
- Susan Hogan as Kathy Rosso
- Alyson Court as Allison Rosso
- Marsha Moreau as Kristin Rosso

== Reception ==
Reception for the film has been mixed, with most reviews upon its initial release being negative. Twitch Film gave a mostly positive review for Rolling Vengeance, stating that although the film didn't go against any genre conventions, it does "play all the right notes to their hilt". Dread Central also praised the film, commenting that it was "a cult film just waiting to be rediscovered". The San Jose Mercury News panned the film, calling it "predictable".
