= Lisa Howard (Canadian actress) =

Canadian actress (born 1963)

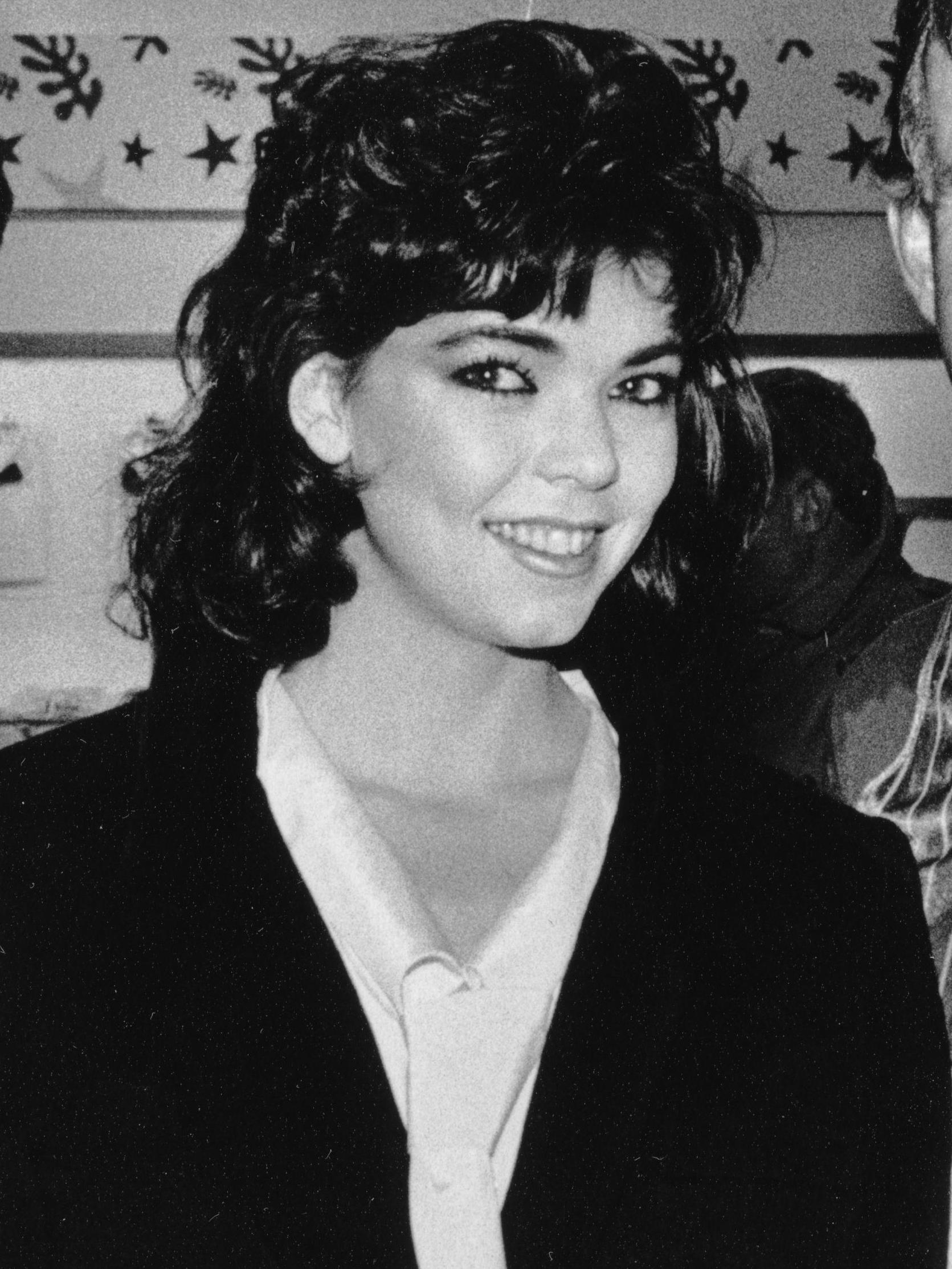
- Howard in 1984
- Born: November 24, 1963 (age 62); London, Ontario, Canada
- Education: Loyalist Collegiate and Vocational Institute; George Brown College
- Years active: 1983–2012
- Spouse: Daniel Cerone (m. 1985)
- Children: 2

Lisa Howard (born November 24, 1963) is a Canadian actress.

== Early life and career ==
Born on November 24, 1963, in London, Ontario, Howard attended Loyalist Collegiate and Vocational Institute and, for one year, George Brown College.

Howard appeared in episodes of Earth: Final Conflict, Tropical Heat, Perry Mason, Days of Our Lives, Wings, Forever Knight, Loving Friends and Perfect Couples, RoboCop: The Series, Cybill, The Pretender and Suddenly Susan. In 1987, she starred in the movie Rolling Vengeance. She played April Ramirez on Days of Our Lives from 1988 to 1991 and from September 1995 to February 1996. Her last credited screen role was a 2009 episode of The Royal. She portrayed Anne Lindsey in Highlander: The Series.

== Personal life ==
Howard is married to producer/writer Daniel Cerone and has two children.

== Filmography ==
=== Film ===
Lisa Howard film credits
Year	Title	Role	Notes
1983	Runners	Schoolgirl	
1985	1918	Constance	
1987	Rolling Vengeance	Misty	
1987	Moonstruck	Patricia	
1989	The War of the Roses	Nurse #2	
1994	Replikator	Lena	
1996	Bounty Hunters	B.B.	
1997	Hardball	B.B.	

=== Television ===
Lisa Howard television credits
Year	Title	Role	Notes
1983	Loving Friends and Perfect Couples	Melissa	2 episodes
1985	Ryan's Hope	Meg Smith	3 episodes
1986	Adderly	Robin	Episode: "Hit-Man Complex"
1986	Easy Prey	Oklahoma Girl #1	Television film
1986	Perry Mason: The Case of the Shooting Star	Sharon Loring	Television film
1986	Hot Shots	Lola	Episode: "Cut Off in His Prime"
1987	I'll Take Manhattan	Stewardess	2 episodes
1988	Almost Grown	Dru Woodward	Episode: "Pilot"
1988–1991	Days of Our Lives	April Ramirez	285 episodes
1991	The Exile	Marilyn	Episode: "The Girl from Brazil"
1991–1993	Tropical Heat	Various role	3 episodes
1992	Wings	Rachel	Episode: "Divorce, American Style"
1992	E.N.G.	Rebecca Kenyan	Episode: "Child's Play"
1992	Forever Knight	Laura Neil	Episode: "Spin Doctor"
1992	Counterstrike	Moya / Ari	Episode: "Cyborg"
1993	Counterstrike	Sam Carvaggio	Episode: "Bad Guys"
1993	Secret Service	Delmonico	Episode: "Blood Money/Fire and Ice"
1994	RoboCop	Brittany	Episode: "Robocop vs. Commander Cash"
1994	Valley of the Dolls	Caitlin North	65 episodes
1994	Janek: The Silent Betrayal	Charlotte	Television film
1994–1996	Highlander: The Series	Anne Lindsey	22 episodes
1995	Hope & Gloria	Lizbeth	Episode: "Manager and Woman"
1996	Cybill	Louise	Episode: "An Officer and a Thespian"
1996–1997	Suddenly Susan	Margo Richmond	4 episodes
1997	The Adventures of Sinbad	Talia	Episode: "The Eye of Kratos"
1997	The Pretender	Annie Lambert	Episode: "Jaroldo!"
1997–2000	Earth: Final Conflict	Lili Marquette / Kala	49 episodes
1998	Sealed with a Kiss	Dr. Lisa Lowen / Gabrielle	Television film
1998	Da Vinci's Inquest	Mistress Harriett	Episode: "The Stranger Inside"
2000	First Wave	Renee Ashford	Episode: "The Harvest"
2005	Everwood	Leslie Hammond	Episode: "Free Fall"
2008	Long Island Confidential	Angela Bonfiglio	Television film
2009	Nip/Tuck	Liz's Date	Episode: "Ricky Wells"
2009	The Royal	Jane Tillotson	Episode: "Compromising Positions"
2012	Body of Proof	Leonard's wife (uncredited)	Episode: "Falling for You"
