= Rene L. Moreno =

American actor (born 1969)

- Born: Rene L. Moreno; December 26, 1969 (age 56); Douglas, Arizona
- Occupation: Actor
- Years active: 1989-present

Rene L. Moreno (born December 26, 1969) is an American actor best known for his role as Private Joseph Ramirez in the television mini-series Band of Brothers, in 2001.

== Early life ==
Moreno was born on December 26, 1969, in Douglas, Arizona, to Mexican parents. He started his acting career in 1989 in a Television series named Teen Angel as Wayne. Since then, he has starred in 32 titles, most notably in Band of Brothers as Technician 5th Grade Joseph Ramirez. He has also starred in video games, such as Ghost Recon Advanced Warfighter, Ultimate Spider-Man, Call of Duty 2, and Tom Clancy's Ghost Recon Advanced Warfighter 2.

== Filmography ==
- 1989 Teen Angel as Wayne
- 1990 Madhouse as Mailroom Runner
- 1990 Young Guns II as Villager #2
- 1993 Shadowhunter as Manny
- 1995 Soldier Boyz as Raul
- 1996 Bio-Dome as Partier
- 1996 Murphy Brown as Bellhop
- 1997 All Lies End in Murder as Markie Valesquez
- 1997 Diagnosis Murder as Brian
- 1998 Caroline in the City as Bullfighter
- 1998 Poodle Springs as Tino
- 1999 Dharma & Greg as Joaquin
- 1999 Tequila Body Shots as Hector
- 2000 City of Angels as Antonio Fernandez
- 2001 Thieves as Chip
- 2001 Band of Brothers as Joseph Ramirez
- 2002 Sun Gods Dionysio
- 2002 Touched by an Angel as Joaquin
- 2002 Providence as Nurse 'Fig' Figueroa
- 2002 ER as Ed
- 2003 Robbery Homicide Division as Victor Zavala
- 2002-2003 Greetings from Tucson as Manny
- 2004 Last Flight Out as Salazar
- 2005 Callback as Zapata Guy
- 2005 Cold Case as Paulo Munoz
- 2007 Heroes as 'Coyote'
- 2007 Ugly Betty as Hector
- 2007 CSI: Crime Scene Investigation as Adam Jiminez
- 2008 Sex and the City as Felix
- 2008 NCIS as Hector Cruz
- 2009 Bones as Barney
- 2010 Weeds as Miguel
- 2015 Runner (TV Movie) as Air Marshall Hernandez
- 2016 Zoobiquity (TV Movie) as Father
- 2018 Chicago P.D. as Victor
- 2019 Shameless as Rinaldo
- 2019 Captive State as Courier
