= Soldier Boyz =

- Poster
- Directed by: Louis Morneau
- Written by: Darryl Quarles
- Produced by: Brad Krevoy; Steve Stabler; Bradley Thomas
- Starring: Michael Dudikoff; Cary-Hiroyuki Tagawa; Tyrin Turner; Channon Roe; Cedrick Terrell; Demetrius Navarro
- Cinematography: Mauro Fiore
- Edited by: Glenn Garland
- Music by: Terry Plumeri
- Distributed by: Motion Picture Corporation of America; Home release: HBO Home Video
- Release dates: October 18, 1995 (Greece); January 26, 1996 (US)
- Running time: 90 minutes
- Country: United States
- Language: English

Soldier Boyz is a 1995 action film directed by Louis Morneau and starring Michael Dudikoff. It was written by Darryl Quarles. The film revolves around a group of convicts on a mission in Vietnam to rescue the daughter of a rich man.

== Plot ==
The film shows a scene of a girl being kidnapped from a charity plane by Vietnamese Hmong rebels (a U.N. supplies as in food and medicine plane) in Vietnam. Then we are taken to the United States to a detention center in Los Angeles where the warden of the center and 6 of the toughest prisoners are hired to rescue the girl, whose name is Gabrielle Prescott, daughter of Jameson Prescott, CEO and billionaire. Warden Toliver and prisoners (by last name only, their first names are never revealed) Butts and "Monster" (black youths), Lopez and Vasquez (Latino youths, with Vasquez being a girl), and Brophy and Lamb (white youths). The group travels to Vietnam with three days to rescue Gabrielle, spending one day to train and the rest of the days to find her.

After winning a battle the group spends the night at a village brothel and has a small celebration, with Brophy sneaking away into the night. The group awakens to find the rebels with Brophy as a hostage and asking the villagers to hand over the rest of the Americans. The group decides to attempt a rescue for Brophy and are successful, however, Lopez and Monster are both killed during the fight. The group runs away into the jungle and is tiredly marching along when Lamb steps on a landmine. While Toliver is trying to disarm the mine, some rebels are slowly getting nearer and nearer to the group. Brophy once again sneaks away but sacrifices himself, bringing another death to the group. Toliver and his men finally arrive at the rebel base camp, with Toliver combing the camp for Gabrielle. After he finds her he returns to the others and hands each of them a set of explosives to be detonated by a timer.

After setting all of the charges, the group is found out and a battle ensues. The group kills scores of rebels but there is no apparent end in sight, forcing the group to retreat. The group is driving away in a stolen armored truck when a missile explodes inches away from the truck. The rebel leader has taken a chopper and followed the band of "soldiers". But Butts had secretly put a charge in the chopper back at the base, and detonates it, killing the rebel leader. The group heads home and the camera shows a chopper flying away into the Vietnamese sunset.

== Cast ==
- Michael Dudikoff as Major Howard Toliver
- Cary-Hiroyuki Tagawa as Vinh Moc
- Dindo Arroyo as Ngo Ma
- Michael Anthony Williams as Du Lich
- David Barry Gray as Lamb
- Tyrin Turner as Butts
- Jacqueline Obradors as Vasquez
- Channon Roe as Brophy
- Cedrick Terrell as "Monster"
- Demetrius Navarro as Lopez
- Jeremiah Birkett as Jenkins
- Rene L. Moreno as Raul
- Don Stroud as Gaton
- Hank Brandt as Jameson Prescott
- Nicole Hansen as Gabrielle Prescott

== Reception ==
Mitch Lovel from The Video Vacuum gave the film two stars and wrote: "The flick is at its best during the scenes where Dudikoff whips his team in shape. It's here where you can see glimpses of a decent movie trying to get out. Once Dudikoff and his "Boyz" start soldiering, it's not much to write home about." Matt Poirier from Direct to Video Connoisseur said about "Soldier Boyz": "It's as bad as the synopsis sounds. I'm not even sure I recommend renting it. It's just so bad. If you see it on TV, and you got nothing else going for a couple of hours like I did, you may want to give it a shot. Otherwise, I'd say this is too silly for even the most seasoned bad movie veteran. Watch a lot of other Dudikoff first, and then come back to this. It should only be seen in the context of Dudikoff as a DTVC Hall of Famer."

On Rotten Tomatoes, the film has 2 reviews listed - both are negative. The only approval rating is from the audience, who have given it a percentage of 37.

== Video game ==
In 1997, Hypnotix and DreamCatcher Interactive released a Soldier Boyz video game adaptation for Microsoft Windows 95.
