= Brion James =

American actor (1945–1999)

- Born: Brion Howard James; February 20, 1945; Redlands, California, U.S.
- Died: August 7, 1999 (aged 54); Malibu, California, U.S.
- Occupation: Actor
- Years active: 1973–1999

Brion Howard James (February 20, 1945 – August 7, 1999) was an American character actor. He portrayed Leon Kowalski in Blade Runner (1982) and appeared in Southern Comfort (1981), 48 Hrs. (1982), Silverado (1985), Red Heat (1988), Tango & Cash (1989), Another 48 Hrs. (1990), The Player (1992), and The Fifth Element (1997). James was frequently cast as an antagonist, appearing more frequently in lower-budget horror and action films and TV shows throughout the 1980s and 1990s. James appeared in more than 100 films before his death in 1999 at the age of 54.

== Early life and education ==
James was born in Redlands, California. He spent his early years in Beaumont, California, where his parents owned and operated a theater; James said, "My story is like Cinema Paradiso. Every night in my life since I was two years old...I ran movies". After graduating from high school in 1964, James attended San Diego State University as a Theater Arts major. Migrating to New York, James immersed himself in the theatre scene, taking on bit roles here and there.

== Career ==
In 1975, James landed a small role in the made-for-television film, The Kansas City Massacre, playing John Dillinger gang member Homer Van Meter. Higher profile roles followed in 1976, with his casting in Nickelodeon and Harry and Walter Go to New York. James also appeared in the television miniseries Roots and popular 1970s shows such as Gunsmoke, The Incredible Hulk, Mork and Mindy, Chico and the Man, CHiPs, and The Rockford Files.

James's career took a sudden upturn in the early 1980s with roles in Southern Comfort and 48 Hrs. (which were both directed by Walter Hill), but it was his performance as Leon Kowalski in the 1982 film Blade Runner that gave him his greatest, most lasting fame. James followed this up with roles in Enemy Mine, Flesh + Blood, A Breed Apart, Silverado, Armed and Dangerous, Red Heat, Steel Dawn, Red Scorpion, Tango & Cash, and Showdown. James had guest spots in the television shows Benson, Quincy, M.E., The A-Team, Little House on the Prairie, The Dukes of Hazzard, Matlock, Miami Vice, Hunter, along with the Hunter take off Sledge Hammer!, and Dynasty. In the 1990s, he appeared in Highlander: The Series, and as Sheriff Bowman in the Millennium season 2 episode "Luminary". He lent his voice to the character of Parasite in Superman: The Animated Series. In 1982, he was in the television film Hear No Evil as Billy Boy Burns.

James starred in the low-budget 1989 supernatural horror film The Horror Show (aka House III), where he played serial killer "Meat Cleaver Max" Jenke. In 1994, he played a grouchy sponsor who became a victim of the gruesome goings-on during a 1939 radio show in the film Radioland Murders. Near the end of his career, he appeared as the amiable General Munro in The Fifth Element (1997), a rare non-villainous role. Two months before his death, James reprised his role as Parasite in Superman 64, a video game based on Superman: The Animated Series.

Concerning his talent for playing villains in films, he stated in an interview in Fangoria magazine, "I consider myself a classical character actor like Lon Chaney, Wallace Beery, Charles Laughton. I always like to play bad guys. I'm real good at psychotic behavior."

== Death ==
James died in 1999 after suffering a heart attack at his home in Malibu, California. He appeared in eight feature films that were released posthumously. The last of these was Phoenix Point (2005). The motion picture The King Is Alive (2000) was dedicated to him.

== Filmography ==
=== Film ===
Year	Title	Role	Notes
1975	Hard Times		Uncredited
1976	Harry and Walter Go to New York	"Hayseed"	
1976	Treasure of Matecumbe	Roustabout	
1976	Bound for Glory	Pick-Up Truck Driver At Border	
1976	Nickelodeon	Bailiff	
1977	Blue Sunshine	Tony	
1978	Corvette Summer	Jeff, Wayne's Carwash Henchman	
1979	KISS Meets the Phantom of the Park	Guard	
1980	Wholly Moses!	Guard At Banquet	
1980	The Jazz Singer	Man In Bar	
1981	The Postman Always Rings Twice	Crapshooter	
1981	Southern Comfort	Cajun Trapper	
1981	Soggy Bottom, U.S.A.	Defalice	
1982	Blade Runner	Leon Kowalski	
1982	48 Hrs.	Inspector Ben Kehoe	
1982	The Ballad of Gregorio Cortez	Captain Rogers	
1984	A Breed Apart	Peyton	
1985	Crimewave	Arthur Coddish	
1985	Flesh & Blood	Karsthans	
1985	Silverado	Hobart	Uncredited
1985	Enemy Mine	Stubbs	
1986	Armed and Dangerous	Tony Lazarus	
1987	Steel Dawn	Tark	
1988	Cherry 2000	Stacy	
1988	Dead Man Walking	Decker	
1988	D.O.A.	Detective Ulmer	
1988	The Wrong Guys	Glen Grunski	
1988	Red Heat	"Streak"	
1988	Nightmare at Noon (aka: Death Street USA)	The Albino	
1988	Red Scorpion	Sergeant Miroslav Krasnov	
1989	The Horror Show	Max Jenke	
1989	Mutator	David Allen	
1989	Circles in a Forest	Mr. Patterson	
1989	Tango & Cash	Requin	
1990	Enid Is Sleeping	Trucker	
1990	Street Asylum	Reverend Mony	
1990	Another 48 Hrs.	Inspector Ben Kehoe / "The Iceman"	
1991	Mom	Nestor Duvalier	
1991	Ultimate Desires	Wolfgang Friedman	
1992	The Player	Joel Levison	
1992	Wishman	Jack "Staten Jack" Rose	
1992	Nemesis	Maritz	
1992	Return to Frogtown	Professor Tanzer	
1993	Time Runner	US Senator John Neila	
1993	Brainsmasher... A Love Story	Detective Brown	Video
1993	Striking Distance	Detective Eddie Eiler	
1993	Showdown	Vice Principal Kowalski	
1993	The Dark	Paul Buckner	
1994	Cabin Boy	Teddy "Big Teddy"	
1994	Future Shock	Jack Porter	
1994	F.T.W.	Sheriff Rudy Morgan	
1994	Savage Land	Cyrus	
1994	Art Deco Detective	Jim Wexler	
1994	Radioland Murders	Bernie King	
1994	The Soft Kill	Ben McCarthy	
1994	Hong Kong '97	Simon Alexander	
1995	Spitfire	Tough Guy	Uncredited
1995	The Nature of the Beast	Sheriff Gordon	
1995	Steel Frontier	General Julius "J.W." Quantrell	
1995	Dominion	Lynwood	
1995	Cyberjack (aka: Virtual Assassin)	Nassim	
1995	The Marshal	Chief Marshal Ollie Mathers	
1995	Indecent Behavior III	Mr. Cowed	Uncredited
1996	The Lazarus Man	Tom Halloran	
1996	Precious Find	Sam Horton	
1996	American Strays	Oris	
1996	Evil Obsession	Stavinski	
1996	Billy Lone Bear	Walsh	
1997	The Killing Jar	Dr. Vincent Garret	
1997	Back in Business	Emery Ryker	
1997	The Fifth Element	General Munro	
1997	Snide and Prejudice	Hermann Goering	
1997	The Setting Son	Junior	
1997	Pterodactyl Woman from Beverly Hills	Salvador Dalí, Sam	
1997	The Underground	Captain Hilton	
1997	Bombshell	Donald	
1998	Jekyll Island	Lawton Goodyear	
1998	Deadly Ransom	Bobby Rico	
1998	In God's Hands	Captain	
1998	Border to Border	Card Shark	
1998	Heist	"Caz"	
1998	Brown's Requiem	Cathcart	
1998	Kai Rabe gegen die Vatikankiller	Mönch	
1998	Joseph's Gift	Frank Childress	
1998	Black Sea 213	Captain Killick	
1998	A Place Called Truth	Hank	
1999	Malevolence	Warden Walker	
1999	Foolish	Ruben Reyes, Talent Scout	Uncredited
1999	Diplomatic Siege	General Stubbs	Posthumous release
1999	Dirt Merchant	Detective Harry Ball	Posthumous release
1999	Arthur's Quest	Trent	Posthumous release
2000	Farewell, My Love	Renault	Posthumous release
2000	The Operator	Vernon Woods	Posthumous release
2000	The King Is Alive	Ashley	Posthumous release
2000	The Thief & the Stripper	"Shoe"	Posthumous release
2005	Phoenix Point	"Spider" Rico	Posthumous release Final film role

=== Television ===
Year	Title	Role	Notes
1974	Get Christie Love!	Trenton	Television film
1974	The Waltons	Henry Ferris Jr.	Episode: "The Birthday"
1975	Gunsmoke	Joe Barnes	Episode: "Manolo"
1977	Roots	Slaver	Miniseries
1977	The Rockford Files	"Clamshell"	Episode: "The Battle of Canoga Park"
1978	Kiss Meets the Phantom of the Park	Second-In-Command Park Security Guard	Television film
1978	The Incredible Hulk	Al	Episode: "Alice in Disco Land"
1978	Mork & Mindy	George	Episode: "Mork's Greatest Hit"
1978	Chico and the Man	"Hog"	Episode: "Waiting for Chongo"
1979	B. J. and the Bear	Bomber, Patrol Officer	2 episodes
1979–1981	CHiPs	Ackerman, Monk	3 episodes
1980	Galactica 1980	Willy	Episode: "Galactica Discovers Earth: Part 1"
1980	The Jeffersons	"Dirty Dog"	Episode: "The Arrival: Part 2"
1981	Benson	Axe-Man	Episode: "The Grass Ain't Greener"
1982	Little House on the Prairie	Amos	Episode: "A Faraway Cry"
1982	Quincy, M.E.	Henry Muller	Episode: "Sleeping Dogs"
1982	Hear No Evil	Billy "Billy Boy" Burns	Television film
1982–1984	The Dukes of Hazzard	Captain Slater, Jenkins	2 episodes
1983	The Gambler: The Adventure Continues	Reece	Television film
1983–1985	The A-Team	David Plout, Ryder	2 episodes
1985	The Fall Guy	Unknown	Episode: "The King of the Stuntmen"
1985	Amazing Stories	Willie Joe	Episode: "Mummy Daddy"
1986	Dynasty	Hawkins	2 episodes
1986	Annihilator	Alien Leader	Television film
1986–1988	Sledge Hammer!	Don Merrill, Felix Ridel	2 episodes
1987	Matlock	Mr. Grock	Episode: "The Author"
1987	The Hitchhiker	Lionel	Episode: "Best Shot"
1988	Miami Vice	Edward Reese	Episode: " Borrasca"
1988–1991	Hunter	Lieutenant Jeff Wadsworth, Thomas Duffy	2 episodes
1991	Tales from the Crypt	Steve Dixon	Episode: "Split Second"
1992	Batman: The Animated Series	Irving	Voice, episode: "Joker's Wild"
1993	Renegade	Eli Starke	Episode: "Moody River"
1993	Rio Diablo	Jake Walker	Television film
1994	Silk Stalkings	Rupert Tarlow	Episode: "T.K.O."
1994	Knight Rider 2010	Jared	Television film
1994	Highlander: The Series	John Durgan / Armand Thorne	Episode: "The Cross of St. Antoine"
1994	M.A.N.T.I.S.	Solomon Box	Episode: "First Steps"
1996	Aaahh!!! Real Monsters	Big Orderly, Chimera	Voice, 2 episodes
1996	Assault on Dome 4	Chairman	Television
1996–1997	Superman: The Animated Series	Rudy Jones / Parasite	Voice, 3 episodes
1997	Walker, Texas Ranger	Rafer Cobb	2 episodes
1997–1999	Todd McFarlane's Spawn	Unknown	Voice, 6 episodes
1998	Millennium	Sheriff Bowman	Episode: "Luminary"
1998	The Sentinel	Warren Chapel	Episode: "Mirror Image"
1998	Men in White	General	Television film
1998	Men in Black: The Series	Drekk	Voice, 2 episodes
1998–1999	The Magnificent Seven	Stuart James	2 episodes

=== Video games ===
Year	Title	Role	Notes
1997	Blade Runner	Leon Kowalski	
1999	Superman 64	Rudy Jones / Parasite	

== Bibliography ==
- Craig Edwards (Spring 1995). "Brion James; Interview by Craig Edwards". Psychotronic Video. 20: 60–64.
