= Rescue Me (film) =

1992 American action film

- Directed by: Arthur Allan Seidelman
- Written by: Michael Snyder
- Produced by: Richard Alfieri
- Starring: Michael Dudikoff; Stephen Dorff; Ami Dolenz; Peter DeLuise; William Lucking; Dee Wallace Stone
- Cinematography: Hanania Baer
- Edited by: Bert Glatstein
- Music by: Joel Hirschhorn; Al Kasha; David Waters
- Production companies: Cannon Pictures; Apollo Pictures
- Distributed by: Cannon Pictures
- Release dates: September 11, 1992 (Germany); December 3, 1993 (United States)
- Running time: 99 minutes
- Language: English

Rescue Me (also known as Street Hunter) is a 1992 American coming-of-age adventure action film directed by Arthur Allan Seidelman and starring Stephen Dorff and Michael Dudikoff.

== Plot ==
When Fraser Sweeney takes a picture of Ginny Grafton (Ami Dolenz), she is kidnapped, and Daniel and Fraser go after the kidnappers. The kidnappers hold her hostage inside the house until she climbs out the bathroom window and escapes the kidnappers, After she escapes the kidnappers, She finds a new boyfriend leaving Fraser unhappy.

== Cast ==
- Stephen Dorff as Fraser Sweeney
- Michael Dudikoff as Daniel "Mac" MacDonald
- William Lucking as Kurt
- Peter DeLuise as Rowdy
- Ami Dolenz as Ginny Grafton
- Dee Wallace as Sarah Sweeney
- Liz Torres as Carney
- Danny Nucci as Todd
- Ty Hardin as Sheriff Gilbert
- Kimberley Kates as Cindy
- Caroline Schlitt as Dawn Johnson
- Jason Kristofer as Billy
- Samantha Phillips as Cherrie

== Legacy ==
Rescue Me was riffed by Rifftrax, the spiritual offshoot of Mystery Science Theater 3000, on September 21, 2018.
