= Tony Frank (actor) =

American actor (1943–2000)

- Born: Tony Lavelle Frank; December 9, 1943; Nacogdoches, Texas, U.S.
- Died: April 18, 2000 (aged 56); Houston, Texas, U.S.
- Resting place: Fairview Church Cemetery; Nacogdoches, Texas, U.S.
- Occupation: Actor
- Years active: 1978–2000
- Spouse: Katherine Swango (m. 1973; div. 1982)

Tony Lavelle Frank (December 9, 1943 – April 18, 2000) was an American actor who appeared in over 60 film and television roles, notably as Salem Jones in the first two installments of North and South (1985–1986).

== Partial filmography ==
- North Dallas Forty (1979) - Rindquist
- Liar's Moon (1981) - Dr. Elton Black
- Tender Mercies (1983) - Man at Motel
- The River Rat (1984) - Poley
- Alamo Bay (1985) - Leroy
- Sweet Dreams (1985) - Bartender
- Extreme Prejudice (1987) - Clarence King
- Johnny Be Good (1988) - Joe Bob
- Talk Radio (1988) - Dino
- Powwow Highway (1989) - Captain Roberts
- Riverbend (1989) - Sheriff Jake
- UHF (1989) - Teri's Father
- Night Game (1989) - Alex Lynch
- Born on the Fourth of July (1989) - Mr. Wilson - Georgia
- Young Guns II (1990) - Judge Bristol
- A Climate for Killing (1991) - Sheriff Elmer Waters
- Convicts (1991) - Sheriff
- Rush (1991) - Nettle
- A Perfect World (1993) - Arch Andrews
- Lone Star (1996) - Fenton
- Varsity Blues (1999) - Clerk
- A Slipping-Down Life (1999) - Zack
- On the Borderline (2001) - Kane
- Cottonmouth (2002) - Judge Voss (final film role)
