= The Human Shield =

- Directed by: Ted Post
- Written by: Mann Rubin
- Starring: Michael Dudikoff
- Distributed by: Cannon Films
- Release date: 1991
- Running time: 88 minutes
- Country: United States
- Language: English

The Human Shield is a 1991 American action film from film studio Cannon Films. It was directed by Ted Post and written by Mann Rubin and stars Michael Dudikoff and Tommy Hinkley. It is about a former government agent who must save his diabetic brother from Iraqi abductors.

== Plot ==
In 1985, during the Iran–Iraq War, Colonel Doug Matthews, is a U.S. Marine hired to help train Iraqi troops to fight off the Iranians. He arrives somewhere in the northern part of Iraq only to discover that stormtroopers are killing people in the nearby village. Doug disagrees with this and attacks Dallai, the leader of the Iraqi troops, but loses.

In 1990, in August, at Baghdad Airport, the news reports that Iraq has invaded Kuwait and that all foreign nationals are to be evacuated. Ben Matthews, Doug's diabetic brother, who is a teacher, is taken away from his wife and child by Iraqi guards for interrogation and is held hostage to lure Doug in to a trap.

== Cast ==
- Michael Dudikoff as Colonel Doug Matthews
- Tommy Hinkley as Ben Matthews
- Hanna Azoulay Hasfari as Lila Haddilh
- Steve Inwood as Ali Dallal
- Uri Gavriel as Tanzi
- Avi Keidar as Sager
- Gil Dagon as David
- Michael Shillo as Joe Albalo
- Roberto Pollack as Bashir
- Irving Kaplan as Sid Cromwell
- Gilat Ankori as Laura Matthews
- Megan Lawson as Laura's Baby
- Michael Eleazar as Iraqi Officer
- Avi Cohen as Blackmarketeer
- Gilya Stern as Stewardess

== Reception ==
Emanuel Levy of Variety magazine called it " a lame, small-budget actioner that exploits its political context without delivering the expected thrills of the genre."
