= Sam Firstenberg =

Israeli-American film director

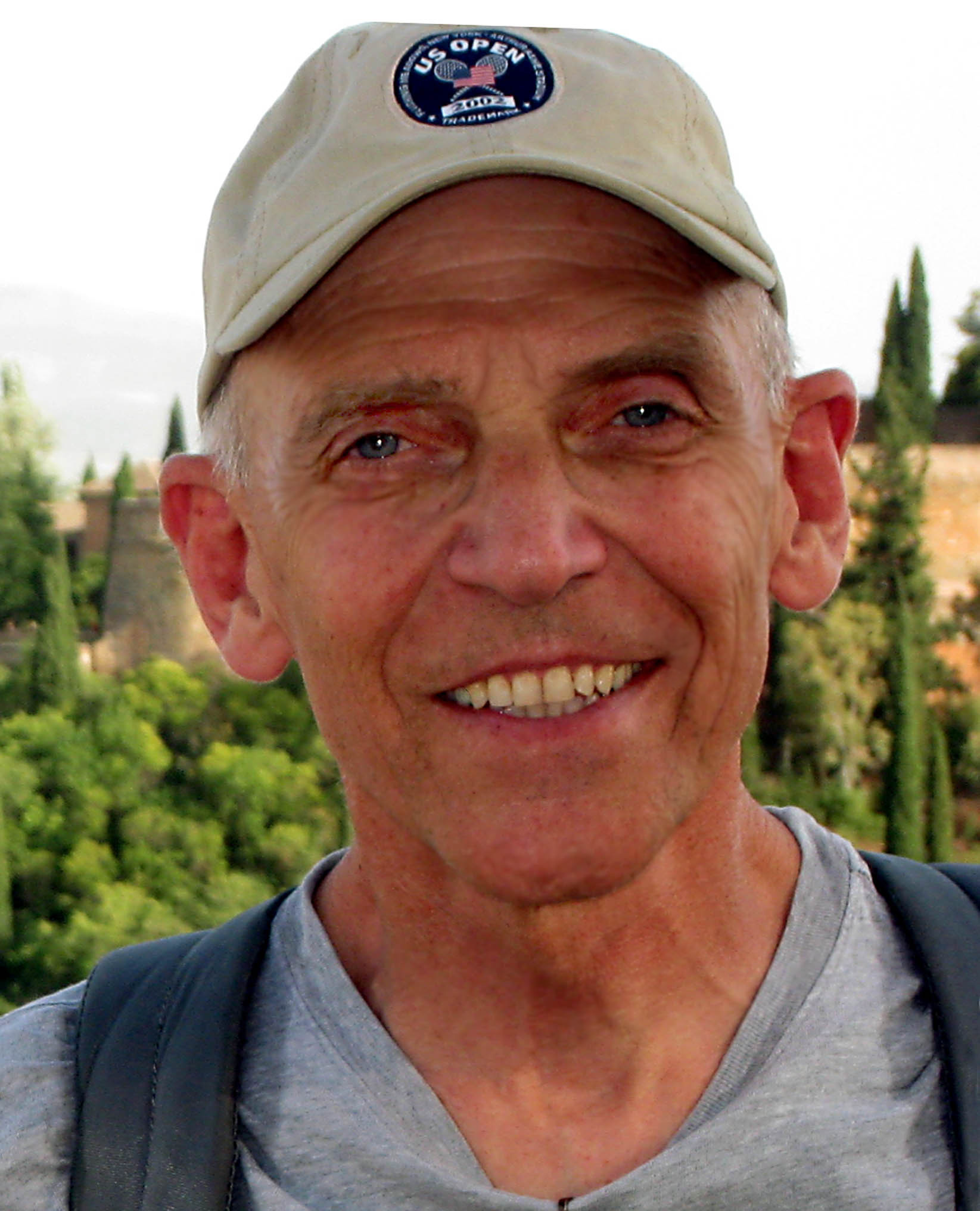
- Born: Shmulik Firstenberg; March 13, 1950 (age 76); Wałbrzych, Poland
- Occupations: Film director, screenwriter, film producer
- Known for: American Ninja; Breakin' 2: Electric Boogaloo
- Website: amfirstenberg.com

Sam Firstenberg (born Shmulik Firstenberg on March 13, 1950) is an Israeli-American film director, screenwriter and film producer.

He is best known for having made low-budget B movies most of his career, among them the first two films in the American Ninja series, American Ninja and American Ninja 2: The Confrontation as well as Riverbend and Breakin' 2: Electric Boogaloo.

Firstenberg's filmography includes genres such as comedy, action, drama, science fiction, thrillers, horror and musicals.

== Personal life ==
Born in Poland to a Jewish family, Sam Firstenberg grew up in Jerusalem. Before attending Loyola Marymount University, he studied filmmaking at Columbia College Hollywood; in 1974, as a second-year student, he gained his first professional film set experience working alongside director Menahem Golan on Lepke (1975). Prior to directing feature films, he worked as a photographer and television cameraman. He has directed 22 theatrical feature films since completing his graduate studies.

== Directing style and approach ==
Firstenberg's visual sensibility was shaped by classic Hollywood cinema as well as Japanese filmmaking, particularly the works of Akira Kurosawa. He was introduced to Hong Kong martial arts cinema by actor Sho Kosugi during the preparation for Revenge of the Ninja (1983).

When working with martial artists and stunt performers without formal acting training, Firstenberg focused on highlighting their natural personality and physical presence rather than forcing conventional dramatic acting. For Michael Dudikoff's stoic, minimal-dialogue portrayal of Joe Armstrong in American Ninja (1985), Firstenberg drew inspiration from James Dean in Rebel Without a Cause and Gary Cooper in High Noon. He has cited Avenging Force (1986) as his best action film, though he later expressed regret over being pressured by Cannon Films to skip filming a planned recovery and training montage for the protagonist in the third act.

Throughout his career, Firstenberg emphasized clear spatial staging, multi-level locations, and readable fight choreography, later criticizing modern action filmmaking for relying heavily on rapid editing and CGI at the expense of physical realism.

== Filmography ==
=== Director ===
- For the Sake of the Dog (1979)
- One More Chance (1981)
- Revenge of the Ninja (1983)
- Ninja III: The Domination (1984)
- Breakin' 2: Electric Boogaloo (1984)
- American Ninja (1985)
- Avenging Force (1986)
- American Ninja 2: The Confrontation (1987)
- Riverbend (1989)
- The Day We Met (1990)
- Delta Force 3: The Killing Game (1991)
- Tropical Heat (1992)
- American Samurai (1992)
- Cyborg Cop (1993)
- Blood Warriors (1993)
- Cyborg Cop II (1994)
- Operation Delta Force (1997)
- Motel Blue (1997)
- McCinsey's Island (1998)
- The Alternate (2000)
- Criss Cross (2001)
- Spiders II: Breeding Ground (2001)
- Quicksand (2002)
- The Interplanetary Surplus Male and Amazon Women of Outer Space (2003)
- The Last Kumite (Pre-production only, then succeeded by Ross W. Clarkson)

=== Writer ===
- For the Sake of the Dog (1979)
- One More Chance (1983)
- Cyborg Cop II (1994)

=== Producer ===
- The Interplanetary Surplus Male and Amazon Women of Outer Space (2003)
- Groove Street (2018)
