= Soldier Boyz (video game) =

1997 video game

- Developer: Hypnotix
- Publishers: DreamCatcher Interactive; MCPA Interactive; Olympic ROM World
- Directors: Jed Weintrob (game and cutscenes); Darren Aronofsky (cutscenes)
- Producers: Brad Krevoy; Steve Stabler; Jed Weintrob
- Designers: Gregory Aranaga; Jed Weintrob; Andrew Osborne; Darren Aronofsky; Jeannette Draper
- Programmers: Tom Kirchner; John Moschetto; Stephen Hadley
- Artist: Mike Taramykin
- Writer: Andrew Osborne
- Platforms: MS-DOS, Windows
- Release: 1997
- Genre: First-person shooter

Soldier Boyz is a 1997 video game by Hypnotix and DreamCatcher Interactive for Microsoft's Windows 95.

== Gameplay ==
The game was an adaptation of the film Soldier Boyz and was a rail shooter that utilized full-motion video to retell the story of the movie. There are some notable changes from the original story, but the end goal is much the same. The game has three difficulty settings: Chump, Punk, and Bad Ass.

== Reception ==
The Soldier Boyz game received a score of 0 out of 5 from Computer Games Strategy Plus, who called it, "one of the worst games to ship in the last few years, one that has no redeeming qualities", and said: "no current shooter is nearly as bad as this game".

A May 2000 review from GameSpot called the game "unsatisfying", saying "It doesn't look good; it doesn't play good" and giving it a 3.8/10. The review criticized the characters as unrelatable, the crosshairs as laggy, and the jungle scenes as "a blurry mass of pixels". The review concluded: "the bottom line is that if you're looking for gory movie violence, you're better off renting a John Woo flick than shelling out money for the predictable gameplay, muddy control, and cliched plot of Soldier Boyz."

Computer Gaming World lambasted the game, stating that it "just might be the game that drives a stake into the heart of FMV". They called the acting "ludicrously overwrought", the gameplay "limp", the controls "redefin[ing] sluggish and unresponsive", and the graphics as akin to having "been shot through a scuba mask smeared with Vaseline".
