= The Cannon Group, Inc. =

Former film studio

- Type: Private
- Industry: Film production
- Founded: October 23, 1967; 59 years ago
- Founders: Dennis Friedland; Christopher C. Dewey
- Defunct: January 21, 1994; 32 years ago
- Fate: Rebranded as Pathé Communications and merged with MGM/UA Communications Co. to form MGM-Pathé Communications
- Successor: MGM-Pathé Communications; New Cannon, Inc.
- Headquarters: Los Angeles, California, United States
- Key people: Menahem Golan; Yoram Globus
- Products: Motion pictures; Video releasing; Cinema chains (UK and Europe)
- Subsidiaries: Cannon Video; Cannon Cinemas; HBO/Cannon Video

The Cannon Group, Inc. was an American group of companies, including Cannon Films, which produced films from 1967 to 1994. The extensive group also owned, amongst others, a large international cinema chain and a video film company that invested heavily in the video market, buying the international video rights to several classic film libraries. The Cannon catalogue encompasses a wide range of different genres. Cannon Films is known for its highly successful 1980s action B movies, such as Missing in Action (1984), American Ninja (1985), and Bloodsport (1988). It also produced the Oscar-nominated films Joe (1970), Runaway Train (1985) and Street Smart (1987).

== 1967–1979: Friedland/Dewey era ==
Cannon Films was incorporated on October 23, 1967. It was formed by Dennis Friedland and Chris Dewey while they were in their early 20s. They had immediate success producing English-language versions of Swedish soft porn films directed by Joseph W. Sarno: Inga (1968), a.k.a. Jag––en oskuld, and To Ingrid, My Love, Lisa (1968), a.k.a. Kvinnolek. By 1970, they had produced films on a larger production scale than a lot of major distributors, such as Joe, starring Peter Boyle, and The Yum-Yum Girls.

They managed this by tightly limiting their budgets to $300,000 per picture—or less, in some cases. The success of Joe brought more attention to the company. As the 1970s moved on, a string of unsuccessful films seriously drained Cannon's capital. This, along with changes to film-production tax laws, led to a drop in Cannon's stock price.

== 1979–1987: Golan-Globus era ==
By 1979, Cannon had hit serious financial difficulties, and Friedland and Dewey sold Cannon to Israeli cousins Menahem Golan and Yoram Globus for $500,000 ($1.79 million in 2025). The two cousins forged a business model of buying bottom-barrel scripts and putting them into production. They produced such films in a variety of genres, although their biggest successes were with action films. They tapped into a ravenous market for B movies in the 1980s. After buying the rights to the 1974 film Death Wish, Cannon produced three sequels to it in the 1980s, all starring Charles Bronson. Despite receiving negative reviews from the critics, these films were financially successful, especially Death Wish II (1982), which earned over $40 million on an $8 million budget.

Other major hits for Cannon were a series of action movies starring Chuck Norris, including Missing in Action (1984), Invasion U.S.A. (1985) and The Delta Force (1986). Missing in Action was criticized heavily as being a preemptive cash-in on the Rambo franchise. James Cameron's story treatment for Rambo: First Blood Part II was floating around Hollywood in 1983, which Golan and Globus reviewed and were "inspired" by. The writers of MIA even gave Cameron credit saying their film was inspired by his script treatment.

The Cannon Group ignited a worldwide ninja craze with "The Ninja Trilogy", a film series which consisted of Enter the Ninja (1981), Revenge of the Ninja (1983), and Ninja III: The Domination (1984), all starring Sho Kosugi, as well as American Ninja (1985) and its sequel American Ninja 2: The Confrontation (1987). Other action/adventure films they produced included the 3-D Treasure of the Four Crowns, King Solomon's Mines, and the vigilante thriller sequel Exterminator 2.

The Cannon Group's biggest financial success was with the 1986 action film Cobra, which starred Sylvester Stallone; not a low-budget film, it earned $160 million on a $25 million budget.

Cannon produced musical and comedy films such as Breakin', Breakin' 2: Electric Boogaloo, The Last American Virgin, and the U.S. release of The Apple (directed by Golan); erotic period drama pictures such as Lady Chatterley's Lover (1981), Bolero, and Mata Hari (1985); science fiction and fantasy films such as Hercules, Lifeforce, and The Barbarians; and serious pictures such as John Cassavetes' Love Streams, Franco Zeffirelli's Otello (a film version of the Verdi opera), Norman Mailer's Tough Guys Don't Dance, and Andrei Konchalovsky's Runaway Train and Shy People.

During these years, Cannon prominently advertised at the Cannes Film Festival each year. Substantial pre-sales of the next years' films (often involving ancillary rights, including international distribution, home video, and television rights to Cannon's productions) were made based on the strong salesmanship skills of Globus. The deposits made from these sales financed production of the first film in the production line-up, which—when completed and delivered to theatre owners around the world—generated enough money to make the next film in the line-up. Slavenburg's Bank in the Netherlands (which had provided Cannon's start-up capital in 1979) and their principal loan officer, Frans Afman, provided bridge financing until the pre-sales amounts were collected; this role was inherited by Credit Lyonnais after their purchase of Slavenburg's in 1983.

In 1982, The Cannon Group, Inc. entered into a relationship with MGM/UA Entertainment Co. with the latter company serving as Cannon's distributor for North American theatrical and video releases; this would not be the last time Cannon dealt with MGM. In 1984, Cannon expanded further into Europe, signing with UGC for French distribution, and acquiring Kenneth Rive's Gala Films, which was absorbed into Cannon Group's U.K. distribution arm. On June 25, 1985, Cannon bought the rights to produce future films based on the comic book character Superman from the Salkinds, and struck a distribution assignment with Warner Bros. Pictures (owners of the Superman property) for a 1987 release. Cannon also further expanded their French assets, with the aim of becoming the largest film distributor in France.

By 1986, output reached an apex with 43 films in one year. Golan remained chairman of the board, while Globus served as president. That year, Cannon attempted to produce film adaptations of the stage plays Zorba and American Buffalo, but these films never materialized. Another film project that ultimately never materialized was a live-action film based on Barbie, with a planned plotline concerning the eponymous doll showing her owner that her dreams could come true. Warner Bros. would eventually release a live-action film based on the property in 2023. Other areas of interest included plans for television adaptation of Cannon properties, and following up their adaptation of Rumpelstiltskin with a total of 12 fairy tale films as the Cannon Movie Tales series; Cannon wound up releasing only a few of the fairy tales.

Film critic Roger Ebert said of Golan-Globus in 1987, "no other production organization in the world today—certainly not any of the seven Hollywood 'majors'—has taken more chances with serious, marginal films than Cannon." That year, Cannon gained its greatest artistic success: its 1986 Dutch production The Assault won the 1987 Academy Award for Best Foreign Language Film and a Golden Globe Award for Best Foreign Language Film. Meanwhile, Otello, based on the opera of the same name, also received a Golden Globe nomination that year.

Golan and Cannon Films tended to over-promote films that did not live up to expectations. For instance, Lifeforce (1985) was to be "the cinematic sci-fi event of the '80s" and Masters of the Universe (1987) was dubbed "the Star Wars of the '80s." Diversifying from film production, Cannon had begun purchasing film distributors and movie theaters. The purchases ranged from European companies (Thorn EMI Screen Entertainment, Tuschinski Theatres, a 49-screen theater chain in the Netherlands, and the 53-screen Cannon Cinema Italia) to the sixth-largest chain in the United States, the 425-screen "marginally profitable" Commonwealth Theaters.

In addition, Cannon also owned the film rights to Spider-Man, and planned to produce a Spider-Man film in the mid-1980s. Golan and Globus agreed to pay Marvel Comics $225,000 over the five-year option period, plus a percentage of the film's revenues. The rights would revert to Marvel if a film was not made by April 1990. Marvel and Sony would eventually complete and release a Spider-Man film in 2002 directed by Sam Raimi after the rights had been re-secured, following a lengthy and messy legal battle between Marvel, Sony and several other parties over the film rights.

Cannon's films proved to be much more popular in the United Kingdom than in its native United States, which is why Cannon acquired several British cinema chains during the 1980s, and founded the mail-order video distribution service Videolog as a joint venture with Columbia House Europe, Ltd. in the mid-1980s. From the mid-1980s until the mid-1990s, Cannon Cinemas were a familiar sight in the United Kingdom until Richard Branson's Virgin Group bought the remaining sites and rebranded them as Virgin Cinemas in 1995. Cannon purchased the assets of Thorn EMI Screen Entertainment from businessman Alan Bond in April 1986 for £175 million; the renamed Cannon Screen Entertainment and archrival The Rank Organization jointly signed a $10 million agreement with the BBC that August for the latter to broadcast both companies' films.

== 1987–1991: Parretti era ==
By 1988, a cooling in the film market and a series of box office disappointments—including the multimillion-dollar production of Superman IV: The Quest for Peace (1987), whose original $36-million budget was slashed to $17 million—had once again put Cannon in financial woes. Concerns about Cannon's financial future had been expressed as early as 1986; one unidentified film executive called the company a "house of cards", with Golan and Globus – between their splashy wheeling and dealing, reports of "penny-pinching" by the duo in terms of business expenses, and numerous lawsuits incurred by the company (including one filed by David Begelman over Cannon's buyout of the Thorn EMI assets; Thorn EMI had been a financing partner of Begelman's Gladden Entertainment) – attaining an unwelcome reputation in the Hollywood community. Dustin Hoffman also filed suit against Cannon, after the company purportedly breached a contract signed with the actor by taking out full-page advertisements to promote Hoffman's involvement with Cannon.

The company signed a $75 million agreement with Warner Bros. Pictures to handle part of their assets; however, the financial loss was staggering. Following the purchase of the Thorn EMI assets, Cannon was severely stretched, and faced bankruptcy; in May 1987, Cannon sold its 2,000-title Thorn-EMI library for $85 million to Weintraub Entertainment Group. Shortly afterwards, Cannon dropped out of the HBO/Cannon Video joint venture with HBO due to Cannon's ongoing financial problems.

The U.S. Securities and Exchange Commission began an investigation into Cannon's financial reports, suspecting that Cannon had fraudulently misstated them. On the verge of failure, Cannon Films was taken over by Pathé Communications, a holding company controlled by Italian financier Giancarlo Parretti. Financed by the French bank Crédit Lyonnais, already involved with Cannon for years, Pathé Communications' takeover of Cannon immediately began a corporate restructuring and refinancing of $250 million to pay off Cannon's debt. By 1989, Golan, citing differences with both Parretti and Globus, resigned from his position and left Cannon to start 21st Century Film Corporation, while Globus remained with Pathé.

One of the final films produced by Golan and Globus that received a wide release under the Cannon Films banner was the post-apocalyptic action film Cyborg. This film was conceived to use both the sets and costumes built for a planned but unmade sequel to Masters of the Universe as well as the ill-fated live-action version of Spider-Man. Both projects were planned to shoot simultaneously under the direction of Albert Pyun. Not to let that pre-production work go to waste, Pyun wrote Cyborg, with Chuck Norris in mind, suggesting it to Cannon Films. Jean-Claude Van Damme was cast in the lead role.

Following Golan's departure from Cannon, he became the head of 21st Century Film Corporation, an independent company. The Cannon Group was renamed and restructured by Parretti with Globus being made co-president of Pathé Communications and chairman of Cannon International and Alan Ladd Jr. was brought in as chairman of Pathé Entertainment. In 1989, Pathé greenlit three films, The Russia House with Sean Connery and Michelle Pfeiffer, Quigley Down Under starring Tom Selleck and Fires Within with Jimmy Smits. They also announced Shattered directed by Wolfgang Petersen, Not Without My Daughter with Sally Field, Company Business starring Gene Hackman and Mikhail Baryshnikov as well as Ridley Scott's Thelma & Louise. They signed a domestic distribution deal with Warner Bros. Pictures for its theatrical product.

Soon after announcing a new slate of films and the distribution deal with Warner Bros., Parretti made a $1.2 billion bid for Metro-Goldwyn-Mayer, backed by Crédit Lyonnais. The bid was accepted and Parretti merged Pathé Communications and MGM to create MGM-Pathé Communications. With the merger, the majority of the former Cannon Group library became part of the MGM library (certain rights for other media and select films during the Thorn EMI merger now lie with other entities). As MGM-Pathé had a distribution deal with Warner Bros. (and who had part financed Parretti's takeover bid), Parretti axed the MGM/UA Home Video department as one of his first acts in charge, resulting in the loss of eighty jobs.

Crédit Lyonnais foreclosed on Parretti in July 1991 after he defaulted on loan payments and sued for the removal of Paretti, his wife Maria Cecconi, his daughter Valentina Parretti, Yoram Globus, Florio Fiorini, Danny Dimbort, Antonio Pares-Neira and Lewis Horowitz from the board of directors.

Parretti – pushed out of management control of MGM-Pathé and the board – proceeded to countersue Crédit Lyonnais, claiming they destroyed his ability to make money at MGM-Pathé, in an attempt to wrestle control back. Parretti was later convicted of perjury and evidence tampering in a Delaware court for statements he made in a 1991 civil case, brought by Credit Lyonnais to validate their removal of Parretti, to the effect that a document he claimed allowed him to retain control of MGM was authentic; he fled the country for Italy before he could be sentenced or extradited to France, where he was wanted on criminal charges related to his use of MGM's French assets.

In 1997, the California Superior Court in Los Angeles entered a final judgement in a separate civil suit against Parretti, ordering him to pay $1.48 billion to Credit Lyonnais. After Federal prosecutors unsealed an indictment against Parretti and Florio Fiorini accusing them of fraud in 1999, Italian authorities arrested both men and held them for extradition to the United States. Parretti was released by the court of appeal in Perugia shortly thereafter, ordered to remain in his home town of Orvieto and report to the police three times a week, even though authorities in Rome had requested he be held pending a decision on the extradition.

== 1989–1997: Cannon Pictures, Inc. era ==
Even as the original Cannon became part of Pathé and subsequently MGM, Parretti opted to reform Cannon in 1989 as his low-budget filmmaking arm (now known as Cannon Pictures, Inc.), led by veteran Italian film producer Ovidio G. Assonitis.

The new Cannon announced their presence at that year's MIFED (Mercato internazionale del film e del documentario) international film market in Milan, with an impressive line-up of multiple new productions and releases, including some with Cannon standbys like Chuck Norris (Fifty/Fifty, Delta Force 2: The Colombian Connection and TOP KICK) and Michael Dudikoff (WINGS, Midnight Ride and American Ninja 4), JAM to be directed by Joel Silberg, Dusted (later released as Death Warrant with Jean-Claude Van Damme), Keaton's Cop with Lee Majors, an untitled film starring Charles Bronson, Crack House with Richard Roundtree and Jim Brown, Rockula, The Rose Garden with Maximilian Schell and Liv Ullmann, The Secret of the Ice Cave with Michael Moriarty and Sally Kellerman and A Man Called Sarge. The new slate of pictures was expected to cost $50 million. The company managed to post a small operating profit before the end of the year. JAM was rebranded as Lambada to cash in on the craze and was released in 1990.

However, the troubles of parent Pathé soon began to affect the re-established Cannon. After the MGM-Pathé merger, Parretti agreed to sell Pathé's 60% majority stake in Cannon Pictures to Assonitis and a group of investors for $14 million. The sale would include the office building at 8200 Wilshire Blvd, where Cannon Pictures was based. Parretti tried to push the deal through quickly to release some capital for MGM-Pathé; however, the deal fell through less than two months later due to financing problems, and MGM-Pathé was granted an easement on financial conditions that were placed upon it by its lenders as part of the MGM buyout.

At the same board meeting, Assonitis and Cannon Pictures vice-chairman William J. Immerman were fired and replaced by Danny Dimbort. Cannon's marketing and casting operations were shut down by Pathé. All of Cannon Pictures' marketing was placed under Pathé's existing operations. Former Cannon Group production head Christopher Pearce was named as Assonitis' replacement and in November 1990, he bought Pathé's stake in Cannon Pictures for $14 million with a deal which allowed Pathé to distribute Lambada, Midnight Ride and American Ninja 4.

Under Pearce, Cannon Pictures announced it would keep contracts with players Charles Bronson, Chuck Norris and Michael Dudikoff signed under Golan's management and revealed a slate of films for 1991, Fifty/Fifty (now starring Peter Weller and Robert Hays), No Place to Hide with Kris Kristofferson and Drew Barrymore, The Hitman (with Norris), as well as The Human Shield and Rescue Me (both with Dudikoff). Richard Inouye joined the company in February 1991 as vice-president and CFO. American Ninja V and the unmade Ants of God were added to the slate at the AFM in 1991 and Warner Home Video signed an agreement to distribute Cannon Pictures' output in North America, UK, Japan, Italy and Australia for ten years.

Cannon Pictures greatly expanded its slate in time for the Cannes Film Festival in 1991 with a total of 18 films, in addition to those already announced, American Kickboxer 1, Black Cat Run with Dudikoff, The Borrower, Deep End and Dream Lover from Boaz Davidson, Delta Force 3: The Killing Game, Ninja: The American Samurai, Solemn Oath and Terminal Bliss had all been added to Cannon's production slate.

When Crédit Lyonnais foreclosed on Parretti in July 1991, the sale of Cannon Pictures was questioned by the bank because Pearce was a board member of MGM-Pathé at the time of the sale and his disclosure of interest had not been documented. Crédit Lyonnais' legal filings against Parretti also named Dimbort, a member of the board of both companies, for receiving $140,000 "for services rendered, although Mr Dimbort did not perform any services to justify payments". Globus was eventually dismissed from the Crédit Lyonnais suits and set up a foreign sales company, Melrose Entertainment, which handled much of Cannon Pictures' sales, alongside that of Global Pictures, another company run by Pearce. In the wake of the Crédit Lyonnais foreclosure on MGM-Pathé, Pearce stepped down as president of Global Pictures, being replaced by Avi Lerner.

In early 1992, there was a middle-management reshuffle at Cannon Pictures with an aim to maximize revenue from Cannon's releases. The Hitman proved to be an early success for the new team. That March, Cannon sued Vision International and its chairman Mark Damon for $15 million over Chuck Norris' involvement in the film, Sidekicks. Cannon Pictures had retained Norris under an "exclusive services" contract that was made in the 1980s by Golan. Cannon Pictures loaned Norris to the makers of Sidekicks for a cameo role under the agreement that he would not appear in more than 30% of the movie; Cannon subsequently objected to Norris receiving "above the title billing" for the film.

At the Cannes Film Festival in 1992, Pearce and Yoram Globus announced they were merging Globus' privately held Melrose Entertainment, Pearce's privately owned Global Pictures and the publicly traded Cannon Pictures into one single entity called the Cannon Entertainment Group. The merger was announced alongside a slate of pictures including Chicago Loop with James Spader, Cold to the Touch with Norris, Teen Angel from Boaz Davidson, Ivory to be directed by Aaron Norris, Delta Force IV: The Deadly Dozen directed by Brian Hutton and White Sun with Dudikoff, as well as a new TV show called Sam Bolt: Texas Ranger, which would later become Walker, Texas Ranger.

Shortly afterwards, they announced that Joe Lara had been signed to an exclusive 10-picture deal with the new company. Lara was then in production on American Cyborg: Steel Warrior which would not be included in the overall deal; however, no films were ultimately made from this deal. By mid-1992, the merger was cancelled after the backers were unable to come to an arrangement with Crédit Lyonnais. Cannon continued with development of Walker, Texas Ranger after CBS picked the series up for 13 episodes. Cash flow problems began to have a serious impact on the company. In October 1992, James Spader sued Cannon Pictures over his $1 million fee for his Chicago Loop pay-or-play deal; and a suit from Michael Dudikoff followed in December, stating he had not been paid from the four films he had made for Cannon.

Cannon Pictures posted a net profit of $1.3 million for the nine months ending September 1992 and secured a new $15 million line of credit from the ING Bank in Amsterdam after Crédit Lyonnais refused to lend more until their loans were fully repaid (said loans weren't due for another four years).

In February 1993, Cannon ran out of money to continue production of Walker, Texas Ranger, due to the indictments of funding partner Banca Nazionale del Lavoro, then embroiled in a scandal over unauthorized loans to Iraq, and producers were desperately trying to raise more money to complete the miniseries. CBS Productions later stepped in with additional funds to complete the production. In August 1993, Cannon reported a net profit of $1 million for its second quarter, double the same period the previous year, due to the success of Walker, Texas Ranger. Cannon Pictures was sued for $14 million in December 1993 by Pictor Insurance Co. and the Peter Miller Corp. for breach of contract over Cannon pulling out of a financing agreement with the two companies.

With this additional pressure, Pearce began exploring selling his stock in Cannon Pictures, but this resulted in another lawsuit being filed against the company and two investment bankers, Robert Blake and Runa Alam, by the Independent Artists Picture Corp. The lawsuit claimed interference and breach of contract in connection with IAPC's plans to buy Cannon Pictures stock in a takeover bid, which would have seen Blake purchase Pearce's stock and Blake and Alam taking control of the day-to-day operations of the company. During this time, Pearce was also exploring a sale to Panda Pictures, but this deal collapsed in yet another lawsuit with Panda claiming $20 million in damages from Cannon Pictures after Pearce reportedly lied about the company's financial condition.

In 1994, Cannon Pictures released its last film, Hellbound, in select theatres in Los Angeles. Shortly afterwards, Pearce sold controlling interest in Cannon Pictures to VMI Acquisitions Inc. The new owners settled some debts at the company, but shortly after the takeover, a group of creditors, including Charles Bronson and Everyvision Inc. sued Cannon Pictures to force it into bankruptcy. The creditors succeeded in pushing the company into Chapter 11 bankruptcy. Soon afterwards, it was discovered Christopher Pearce was selling disputed Cannon titles, including Twin Sitters, Delta Force 3, American Samurai, Street Knight, Tobe Hooper's Night Terrors and American Cyborg: Steel Warrior at the Tokyo Film Festival. A judge blocked all sales made at Tokyo and blocked any further sales that were due to take place at MIFED 1994. To prevent any fraudulent deals at MIFED, a warning appeared in Screen International and other publications stating all business must be done with the court appointed trustee and not with Pearce.

The United States bankruptcy court set a deadline of January 11, 1995 for creditors of Cannon Pictures to submit their claim and evidence of debt. Cannon Pictures, its library of 135 films, as well as 112 films from the company's previous incarnation, 21st Century Film Distribution, officially went up for sale on August 14, 1997 with the auction taking place on September 15. The property was sold to Imperial Entertainment.

In February 1998, a judge ruled that Ovidio G. Assonitis had been wrongfully terminated from the company by Parretti and Pathé. The judge awarded Assonitis $2.9 million in damages, but by this time, Pathé was bankrupt and had been foreclosed on by Credit Lyonnais.

== 2001–2002: New Cannon, Inc. era ==
Despite the protracted death of company in its original and reincarnated forms, Golan returned to the filmmaking business in 2001 with New Cannon, Inc. Golan hired Evgeny Afineevsky to act as the company's president. Afineevsky would be based in Los Angeles, while Golan would be based in Tel Aviv. Crime and Punishment, which was originally shot in 1993 under Golan's 21st Century Film Corporation but was not released before 21st Century's bankruptcy, was their first offering alongside a slate of new films including Death Game, a remake of Fritz Lang's M, Kumite (later made as Final Combat but never released) and Open Heart (released in 2002 as Return from India).

By the 2002 Cannes Film Festival, New Cannon had completed Death Game and Return from India and announced a new project, Beauty and the Beast to be directed by Pharaoh Phillips, alongside sales for previously released films Train to Hell and In Search of A Woman. The company was taken over by Vision Films later that year; Afineevsky went on to form New Generation Films to produce Oy Vey! My Son Is Gay!! from a script by Golan. He went on to make documentaries, Cries from Syria and Winter on Fire: Ukraine's Fight for Freedom, which was nominated for an Academy Award for Best Documentary Feature and the Primetime Emmy Award in the Exceptional Merit in Documentary Filmmaking category.

Golan continued to produce and direct films after New Cannon, including Children of Wax with Armand Assante and Udo Kier, A Dangerous Dance and Marriage Agreement. In 2013, Golan announced sequels to several films he had produced at Cannon in partnership with MGM (successor-in-interest to the original Cannon), including Allan Quatermain and the Jewel of the East with Richard Chamberlain and Sharon Stone returning to their roles, Return of the Delta Force and American Ninja Apprentice with Michael Dudikoff, David Bradley and Steve James' daughter Debbi, alongside new original projects The Sniper with Mickey Rourke and Bruce Willis and The Golem with Al Pacino and Nastassja Kinski; however, Golan died before any were produced.

== 2014: Homage phenomenon ==
=== Rival documentaries ===
In 2014, there were two documentary films released about Cannon Films. RatPac Entertainment released Electric Boogaloo: The Wild, Untold Story of Cannon Films, a documentary about Cannon Films, written and directed by Mark Hartley, and produced by Brett Ratner. That same year, the Israeli documentary The Go-Go Boys: The Inside Story of Cannon Films was launched at the 2014 Cannes Film Festival. As is noted at the end of Electric Boogaloo, Golan and Globus announced The Go-Go Boys shortly after they were approached to appear in Boogaloo, yet in true Cannon fashion, their movie beat Hartley's to release by 3 months.

=== Gunship ===
In 2014, the British synthwave band Gunship was formed, and in the ensuing years, they would release several songs and music videos inspired by 1980s media, including films produced by Cannon. One of the band's main logos was also based on the Cannon logo.

== 2016–present: Rebel Way Entertainment ==
In 2015, Globus sold "Globus Max" and returned to Hollywood to launch a new film production company, Rebel Way Entertainment. The company seeks to reconnect young and web-crazy audiences with the traditional theatrical experience. As of February 2023, their only film is Deported (2020), directed by Tyler Spindel.

== See also ==
- MGM Home Entertainment, whose parent company MGM now owns most of Cannon films' library.
- Skydance Corporation
  - Warner Bros. Home Entertainment, the company now owns most of Cannon films' non-MGM-related back catalog.
  - Paramount Pictures, the company that owns the television rights to most of the Cannon library.
