= Jason Steele (wrestler) =

South African professional wrestler, bodybuilder, & actor

Personal information
- Born: Johannesburg, South Africa
- Years active: 1998-present
- Height: 6 ft 1 in (1.85 m)
- Weight: 250 lb (113 kg)

Jason Steele is a South African wrestler, bodybuilder, and actor.

== Early career ==
=== Bodybuilding ===
In 1997, during his debut at a bodybuilding contest, Steele competed in the junior under-18 division at a weight of 110 lbs and finished in last place. Steele returned the next year after gaining more weight (bulking), weighing in at 187 lbs, and won first place in the junior division.

In 2000, Steele won the junior nationals. He competed again in 2003 as a senior, winning the super heavy weight class. In 2014, Steele secured a spot at the IFBB Nationals by winning the super heavyweight division at the provincial championships.

== Powerlifting (2000-2004) ==
In 2003, Steele competed at the National Bench Press championships, breaking the junior national record with a 565lbs press. In 2009, he pressed 506lbs at a regional event.

== Professional Wrestling career ==
Steele performed for World Wrestling Professionals in 2005 during the first season of WWP Thunderstrike, wrestling as The Gatekeeper.

In 2005, Steele travelled to the United States of America and wrestled for various independent promotions, including the Houston-based promotion Pro Wrestling Alliance which was promoted by Booker T. He used the moniker Jason the Terror and was one-half of The South African Connection team with Ananzi. On June 29, 2007, Steele and Ananzi were defeated by Gabe Hollier and Surfin Surge in PWA Tag Team Qualifying match. On July 21, 2007, they were beaten by The Trump Twins in a PWA Tag Team Tournament Semifinal match.

== PWA ==
Steele, along with Ananzi, trained at the Houston-based PWA run by multiple world champion Booker T. Steele and Ananzi created a tag team and entered the PWA tag team championships, matched against Gabe Hollier and Surfin Surge as well as the Trumps.

== WWP ==
Jason Steele made his debut with WWP Thunderstrike on SABC 2 in late 2008. He had feuds with Angelico and Justin Gabriel and ended the series as one of the top-rated wrestlers in South Africa history.

2009 and 2010 saw Steele wrestle for Colors TV in India on 100% De Dana Dan. He was positioned as the faction heel and antagonist to the Indian wrestlers. Steele dominated the show with notable matches against Sando Paaiji and Murat Bosporus and was seen as a staple of the show. He appeared on a 2009 version of India Has Got Talent with Tornado to promote the newly formed wrestling show.

== Film/Television career ==
In 2016, Steele signed with his talent agent, Sean Fernandez, gaining various commercial roles during that year. As of 2017, Steele has been cast for a Marvel film as well as a Netflix series.

In addition to wrestling and film, Steele has done commercial and music video work. He appeared in a commercial promoting the 2010 FIFA World Cup where he was in a team with muscular men against another from South Africa.

== Filmography ==
=== Film ===
Year	Title	Role	Notes
2010	Maar Pitaee	Strongman	Uncredited
2016	Untitled Marvel Film	Paraplegic Wrestler	

=== Television ===
Year	Title	Role	Notes
2005	WWP Thunderstrike	Gatekeeper	
2008	WWP Thunderstrike	Jason Steele	
2010	100% De Dhana Dhan	Jason Steele	
2010	India's Got Talent	Guest Star	Episode: "23"
