= Joe E. Legend =

Canadian professional wrestler (born 1969)

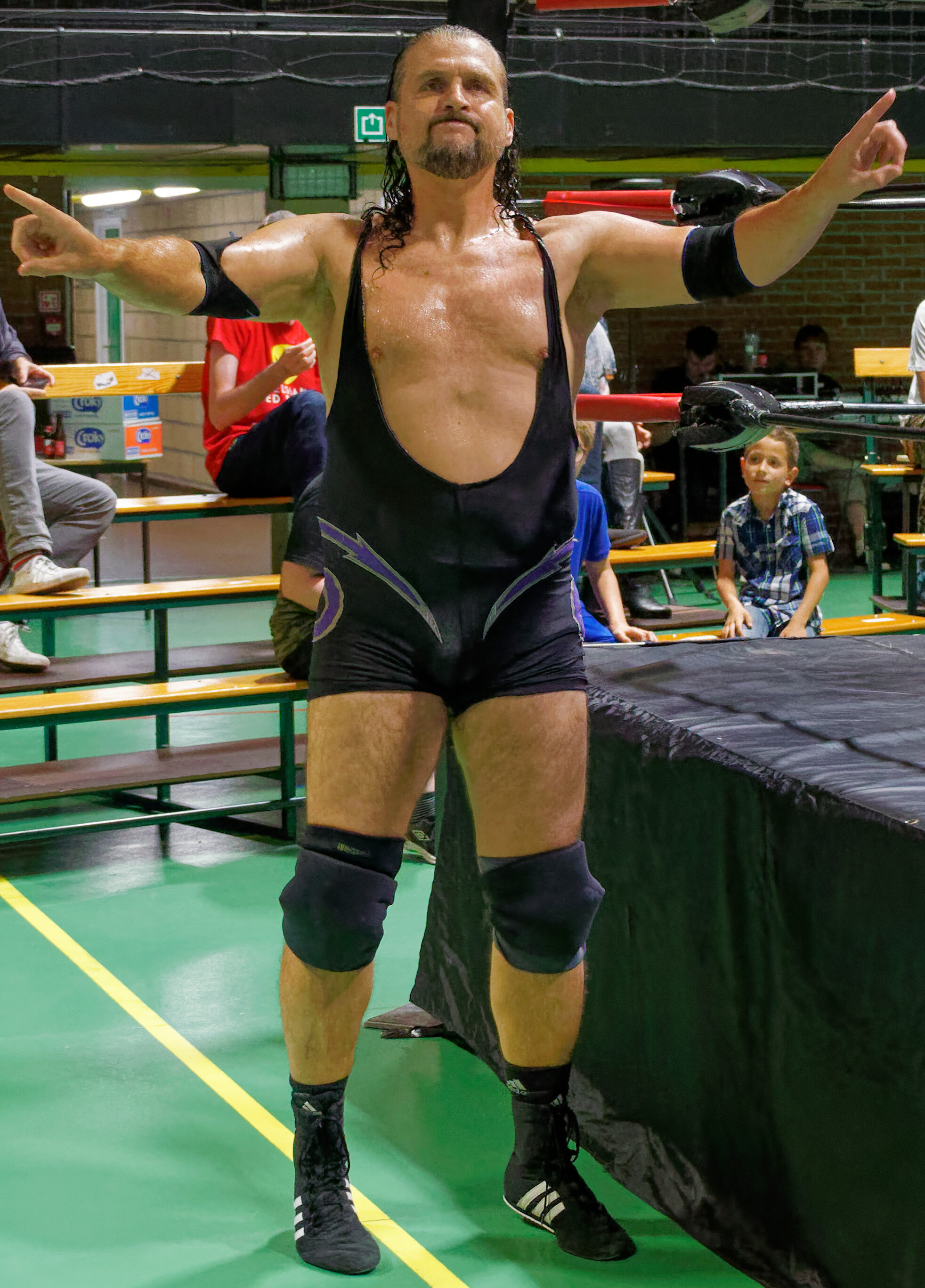
- Legend in 2019

Personal information
- Born: Joseph Edward Hitchen; September 2, 1969 (age 57) Toronto, Ontario, Canada
- Spouse: Svenia Hitchen (m. 2003)
- Children: 2

Professional wrestling career
- Ring name(s): Billy Johnson; Bluto Belushi; Dragon; Joe E. Legend; Joe Legend; Joe Sampson; Just Joe; Legend; Master Joe Storm; Nord; XL-Legend; Joe X-Legend; Joe Ace; Joe Megalodon
- Billed height: 6 ft 1 in (185 cm)
- Billed weight: 252 lb (114 kg)
- Billed from: Toronto, Canada, Canada; Glasgow, Scotland (as Nord) "Parts Unknown" (as Dragon)
- Trained by: Ron Hutchison; Sweet Daddy Siki
- Debut: 1992

Joseph Edward Hitchen (born September 2, 1969) is a Canadian professional wrestler and trainer, known under his ring name Joe E. Legend. He also wrestled for the World Wrestling Federation (WWF, now WWE) from 2000 to 2001 under the ring name Just Joe.

== Professional wrestling career ==
=== Early career (1992–1997) ===
Joe Legend began wrestling in Canada before becoming a part of the successful tag team Sex and Violence with Sexton Hardcastle in the Detroit area. His debut match was against Zakk Wyld (Keith Assoun) in Brampton. Ontario in 1992. From 1992 to 1993 he worked in Japan. During 1997, Sex and Violence were a part of a bigger gang which was known as THUG Life, which was composed of Legend, Hardcastle, Christian Cage, Zakk Wyld, Bloody Bill Skullion and Rhino Richards. Among his catchphrases used was "Heroes come and heroes go, but legends live forever!"

=== Touring Europe (1998–present) ===
Hitchen later competed under XL Legend in the Catch Wrestling Association which is based in Germany. He later teamed with Rhino Richards to win the vacant World Tag Team Championships by defeating Rico de Cuba and August Smisl on October 10, 1998, in Hanover, Germany. The title was vacated in October 1998 when Rhino Richards left the promotion after signing with Extreme Championship Wrestling. Legend found success in Germany and England.

In April 2005, he was one of the lead trainers of Celebrity Wrestling in the United Kingdom on ITV. This Saturday evening reality show saw celebrities learn wrestling and compete in challenge matches. After a few weeks the program was set to be cancelled, but instead was moved to Sunday morning to finish its final episodes.

He can now be found wrestling in and around the United Kingdom for promotions such as All Star Wrestling, working regular shows at Butlins holiday parks after throwing out an open challenge to potential rivals for his Pan Pacific and GSA heavyweight titles. He has also toured Wales for both Orig Williams and Alan Ravenhill.

During his time in the now defunct Frontier Wrestling Alliance he wrestled for the FWA British Heavyweight Championship in a five-way match at The Champions Series Final on January 5, 2006, in Hoddesdon, Hertfordshire, England, but was defeated by Hade Vansen.

Hitchen also has wrestled in many other countries around the continent, countries such as Denmark, Poland, Italy, France, Portugal, Austria, Russia, Switzerland, Netherlands, Belgium and Greece. Overall, he wrestled in more than 24 countries around the world.

In 2014, in February he lost to David Hart Smith in a DWA/PWF match in Germany. Then he lost to Andrei Ivanov in Pro Wrestling Showdown in the Netherlands. In March he lost to Wolfgang in Premier British Wrestling. In April and May he competed in German organizations Deutsche Wrestling Allianz, German Hurricane Wrestling, Westside Xtreme Wrestling and Power of Wrestling.

=== World Wrestling Federation (2000–2001) ===
After a few try-out matches, Joe got signed in June 2000. He made his TV debut on the August 8, 2000 episode of Heat where he lost to WWF Light Heavyweight Champion Dean Malenko as Just Joe in the WWF. His gimmick was that of a messenger who tried to stir the pot. He scored victories over Gangrel, Joey Abs, Brooklyn Brawler and Essa Rios. until being taken off TV that November. He was released from his contract in March 2001.

=== Touring the United States (2003–2004) ===
During his time in the United States, Hitchen competed in the Puerto Rican International Wrestling Association under the ring name Nord. On March 8, 2003, he captured the IWA Intercontinental Heavyweight Championship by defeating Glamour Boy Shane in Toa Baja, Puerto Rico. He lost the championship to Chicano in Bayamón, Puerto Rico on April 19 the same year.

He returned to America in 2004 to compete in the Nashville, Tennessee-based Total Nonstop Action Wrestling. During his time in TNA as part of the Red Shirt Security, he won the NWA World Tag Team Championship with Kevin Northcutt. They held the belts from January 28, 2004 to February 4 of the same year.

=== Russian and Japanese promotions (2006–2010) ===
Hitchen made his debut in Russia as he competed at Independent Wrestling Federation's Wrestliada 2006 in Moscow, Russia, under the ring name Joe Legend. At the July 28, 2007 event he defeated Volcano to become the first IWF World Champion. During his reign he defeated Raven to retain the championship.

In August 2006, he worked for Pro Wrestling NOAH on their Shiny Navigation Tour, and in April 2007, he worked on the Spring Navigation tour. From July to September 2010, he toured with Pro Wrestling Zero1 working the likes of Masato Tanaka, Shinjiro Otani, Ikuto Hidaka, and Sylvester Terkay.

=== World Wrestling Professionals (2007–2014) ===
Joe E. Legend tours annually with World Wrestling Professionals (WWP), a South African promotion currently airing on a nationally broadcast network. He also acts as their scouting agent, having been responsible for bringing Mikey Whiplash, Angelico and Murat over to WWP. Joe Legend worked for WWP in 2007 and 2008 and returned in 2009.

The January 10, 2009 episode of WWP saw Joe Legend defeat PJ Black (better known as Justin Gabriel) to capture the then vacant WWP Heavyweight World Title for the first time.

His most recent appearance for WWP was on a tour of Nigeria in August 2014, where he interfered in Tornado's match, causing him to lose to Nigerian wrestler De Ultimate Commander.

=== Pro Wrestling Showdown (2017) ===
Joe Legend came back 25 November 2017 (Showdown 33), defeating Alexander James in a match for a spot in the Pro Wrestling Showdown World Cup.

=== Unlimited Wrestling (2019) ===
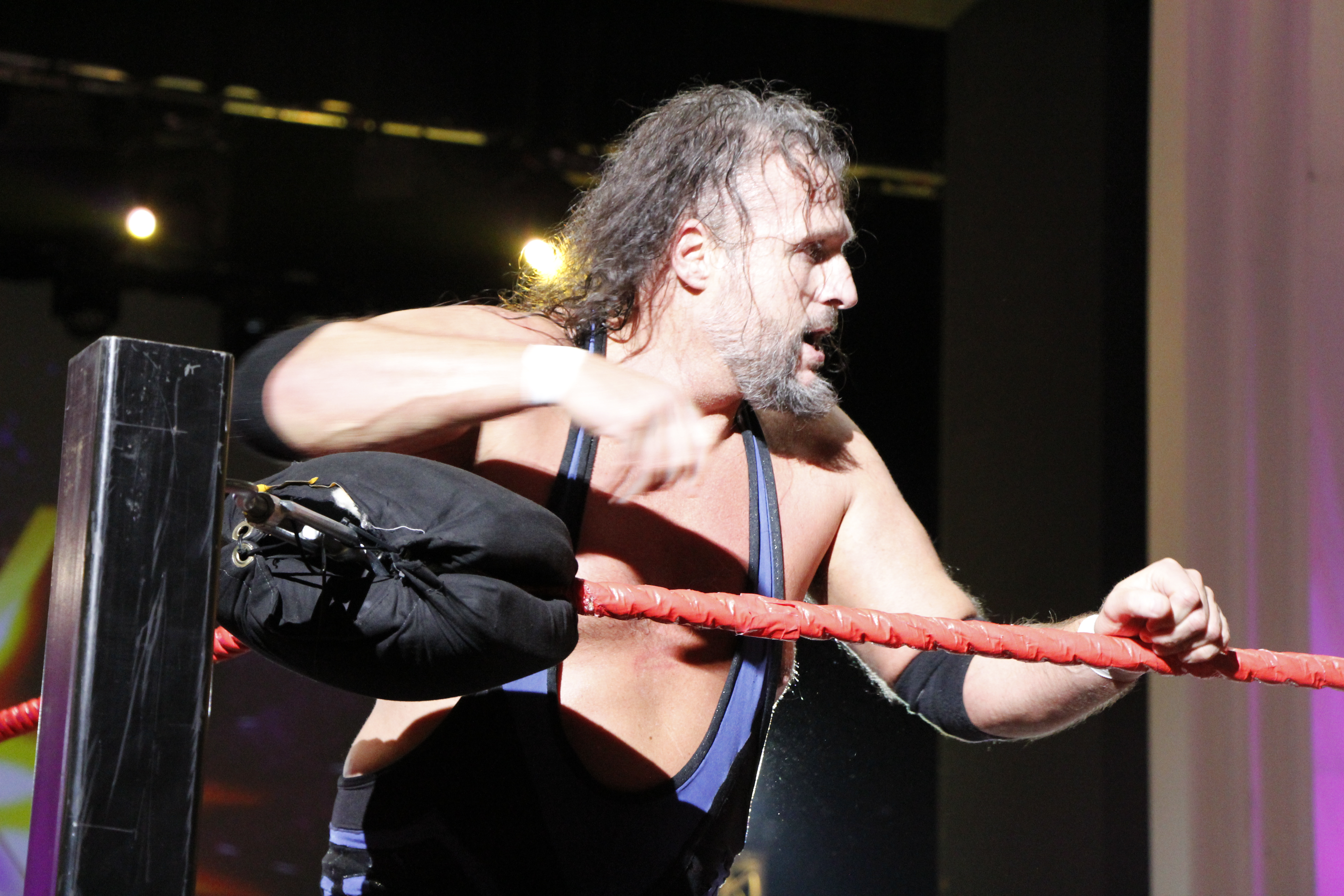
Legend in 2022

Joe Legend joined the German based company Unlimited Wrestling in 2019, where he mostly competes in the most important matches on the card.

== Other media ==
In December 2007, Joe E. Legend became the co-host of The Main Event Radio, the official podcast of TotalWrestling.net.

In May 2009, Hitchen was announced as one of the competitors on the Turkish version of Gladiators, which began filming in September 2009.

Joe E Legend has also acted in several films in France and the UK as well as taking the role of "fight choreographer" for these features. Joe is represented by Jessica Soss of V.S Films and is actively pursuing further roles in film and TV.

== Personal life ==
Hitchen is good friends with fellow professional wrestlers Terry Gerin, Don Callis, Jay Reso, and Adam Copeland. He and his wife, Svenia Hitchen, have twin boys named Connor and Maverick.

== Published works ==
Hitchen is the co-author of Marie's World, published in June 2014 by Austin Macauley Publishers.

== Championships and accomplishments ==
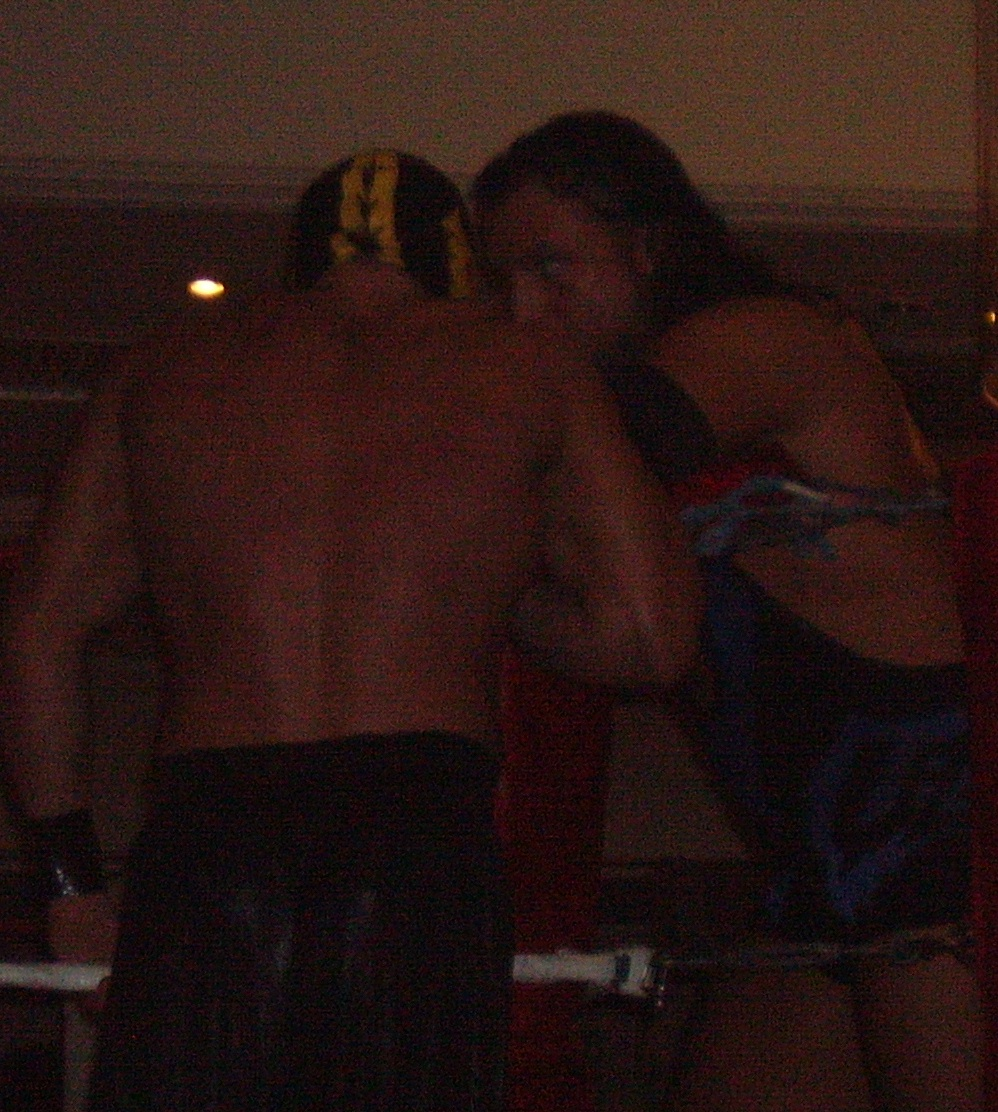
Legend (right) at a wrestling live event in Arklow, Ireland in 2008

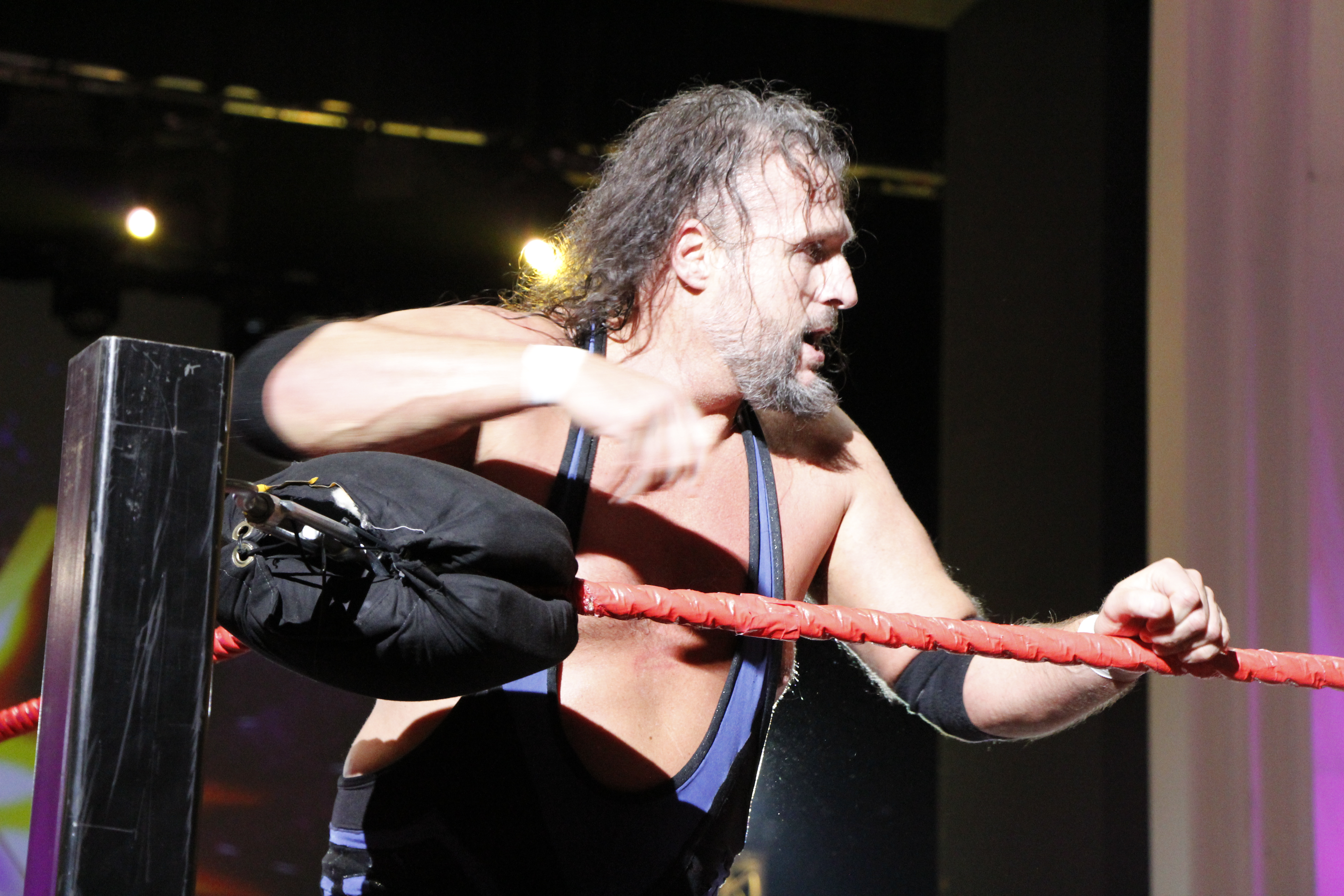
Legend in 2022

- Association Biterroise de Catch
  - ABC Ultimate Championship (1 time)
- Asylum Of Wrestling Maniacs
  - AWM Heavyweight Championship (1 time)
- Athletik Club Wrestling
  - ACW Heavyweight Championship (1 time)
- Atlantic Grand Prix Wrestling
  - AGPW Continental Championship (1 time)
- Catch Wrestling Association
  - CWA World Tag Team Championship (1 time) - with Rhino Richards
- Catch Wrestling Promotion
  - CWP World Heavyweight Championship (1 time, current)
- Deutsche Wrestling Allianz
  - DWA World Heavyweight Championship (1 time)
- Do or Die Wrestling
  - DDW International Championship (1 time)
- Flemish Wrestling Force
  - FWF Tag Team Championship (1 time) - with Jerry Sags
- Rough Wrestling International
  - RWI Heavyweight Championship (1 time)
- German Stampede Wrestling
  - GSW Heavyweight Championship (1 time)
  - Battlefield (2005)
- German Wrestling Promotion
  - GWP World Championship (1 time)
  - GWP WrestlingCorner.de Championship (1 time)
- Herts and Essex Wrestling
  - HEW Heavyweight Championship (2 times)
- Insane Championship Wrestling
  - ICW Brass Knuckles Championship (1 time)
  - ICW/MWCW Mid-West Unified Tag Team Championship (1 time) - with Sexton Hardcastle
- International Wrestling Association
  - IWA Intercontinental Heavyweight Championship (1 time)
  - IWA Television Championship (1 time)
- Independent Wrestling Federation (Russia)
  - IWF World Championship (1 time)
- Pro Wrestling Fighters
  - Buckhorn Wrestling Cup (2009)
- International Catch Wrestling Alliance
  - ICWA World Heavyweight Championship (1 time)
- LDN Wrestling
  - LDN British Heavyweight Championship (1 time)
- Outlaw Championship Wrestling
  - OCW Tag Team Championship (1 time) - with Sexton Hardcastle
- Pennsylvania Championship Wrestling
  - PCW America's Heavyweight Championship (1 time)
  - Giorgio Foods Tag Team Tournament (1999) - with Jason Lee
- Power of Wrestling
  - POW Intercontinental Championship (1 time)
- Pro Wrestling Fighters
  - PWF Buckhorn Wrestling Cup (2009)
- Power Wrestling Entertainment
  - PWE World Championship (1 time)
- Pro Wrestling Illustrated
  - PWI ranked him #140 of the top 500 singles wrestlers in the PWI 500 in 2009
- Pro Wrestling Showdown
  - PWS Heavyweight Championship (1 time)
- Pro Wrestling Xtreme
  - PWX Heavyweight Championship (1 time)
- Pan Pacific Wrestling Association
  - Pan Pacific Heavyweight Championship (1 time)
- Scottish School Of Wrestling
  - SSW Hardcore Championship (1 time)
- Swiss Wrestling Federation
  - SWF Powerhouse Championship (1 time)
- Total Nonstop Action Wrestling
  - NWA World Tag Team Championship (1 time) - with Kevin Northcutt
- World Wide Wrestling League
  - W3L Heavyweight Championship (1 time)
- World Wrestling Professionals
  - WWP World Heavyweight Championship (1 time)
- World Wrestling Superstars
  - WWS Heavyweight Championship (1 time)
- Ring Wars
  - Ring Wars National Championship (1 time)
- Wrestling-Family-Germany Promotion
  - WFG Championship (1 time, inaugural)
  - WFG Title Tournament (2009)
- YAWARA
  - YAWARA Championship (1 time)
- Other titles
  - IMP Tag Team Championship (1 time)
  - GPW Continental Championship (2 times)
  - PPW World Super-Heavyweight Championship (1time)
