= 100% De Dana Dan =

- Starring: Stars of World Wrestling Professionals
- Country of origin: India
- No. of seasons: 1
- No. of episodes: 26

Production
- Camera setup: Multi-camera setup
- Running time: 60 minutes (with commercials)

Original release
- Network: Colors TV
- Release: 29 August – 20 December 2009

100% De Dana Dan (transl. Hit Left and Right) was a short-lived Indian professional wrestling television program produced by the World Wrestling Professionals — a wrestling promotion based in South Africa — that aired on Colors TV. It completed its first and only season, which began on 29 August 2009, and ended on 20 December 2009. 100% De Dana Dan was a hybrid of reality television and wrestling based on 100% Lucha Libre, and saw wrestlers from India facing wrestlers from South Africa in faction warfare. The kayfabe plot of the show involved the Indian wrestlers being trapped in South Africa and stumbling upon an underground fight league headed by Mark Beale and WWP. It was owned by Sirshak Shrestha.

== Overview ==
WWP wrestlers Tornado, Jason Steele and Ananzi were involved in training many of the wrestlers from India. In the middle of 2009, WWP held a tryout in Mumbai, India, searching for athletic candidates for the show. They selected twelve candidates to be trained before the 100% De Dana Dan television tapings in August and September. Bollywood film stars Isha Koppikar and Sharat Saxena had roles in the show. The commentary was done by popular host Mohan Kapoor. Isha Koppikar participated as a live presenter while Saxena was the kayfabe manager of the Indian team.

In highlights from the first season, Tornado became the 100% Heavyweight Champion on the second show and defended the championship for most of its run until being dethroned by the much larger competitor Goonga in the final episode. Tornado won a tournament where the winner would be awarded the WWP Heavyweight World Title, but seeing as he was already the champion, he retained the championship. Sando Paji defeated Tornado to win the 100% Championship but had refused to accept the title, and it was awarded back to Tornado. Ananzi and Jason Steele were featured prominently on the show, with Steele winning a title contender's tournament that lasted several weeks and Ananzi winning a crucial ladder match against Angelico that awarded the winning team keys to a new vehicle. A controversial angle aired where one of the wrestlers competing on the Indian team died in the ring as a result of injuries inflicted by the Nigerian wrestler Kilimanjaro, which later led to an angle where the passed wrestler returned.

== See also ==
- List of professional wrestling television series
