= Adam Rose (wrestler) =

South African professional wrestler (born 1979)

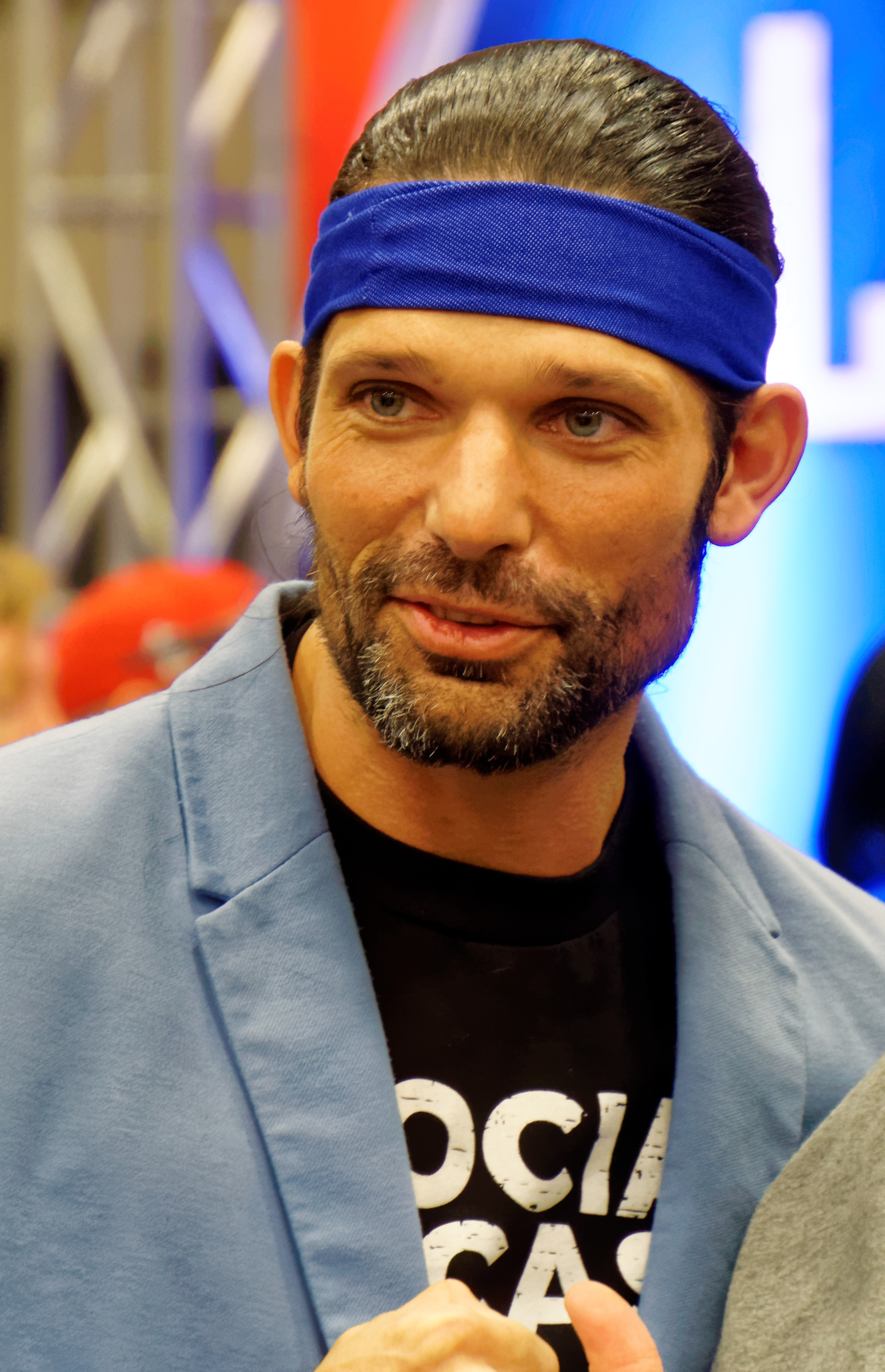
- Leppan in April 2016

Personal information
- Born: Raymond John Leppan; 20 July 1979 (age 47) Johannesburg, Transvaal, South Africa
- Spouse: Cassandra Leppan (m. 2010; div. 2019)
- Children: 2

Professional wrestling career
- Ring name(s): Adam Rose; Aldo Rose; Dameon Duke; Krugar; Leo Kruger; Z-Max
- Billed height: 6 ft 1 in (185 cm)
- Billed weight: 218 lb (99 kg)
- Billed from: Johannesburg, South Africa; Musha Cay, Bahamas
- Trained by: Florida Championship Wrestling; Paul Lloyd Sr.
- Debut: 1995
- Retired: June 14, 2019

Raymond John Leppan (born 20 July 1979) is a South African retired professional wrestler. He is best known for his tenure in WWE under the ring name Adam Rose.

Making his debut on the South African independent circuit in 1995, Leppan signed with WWE in 2010, wrestling in its developmental territory Florida Championship Wrestling (FCW) under the ring name Leo Kruger, where he became a two-time FCW Florida Heavyweight Champion. After FCW folded in 2012, Leppan continued to wrestle in its successor NXT as Leo Kruger, before moving to WWE's main roster, as Adam Rose in early 2014. After a series of controversies, Leppan asked for his release from the promotion in April 2016 and wrestled in the international independent circuit until he retired in June 2019.

== Early life ==
According to an E60 interview, Adam wanted to wrestle from the age of 9. A school drop-out, Leppan ran away from home when he was 14, then spent two years living on the streets and in abandoned buildings. Leppan later described that he had been "spiraling out of control" during that period, which was full of violence and alcohol, and only the thought of becoming a wrestler had helped him escape. Leppan's mother later successfully managed to entice Leppan to return home to Johannesburg from Durban with the prospect of beginning wrestling classes.

== Professional wrestling career ==
=== Early career (1995–2010) ===
Leppan made his professional wrestling debut in 1995 at the age of 15 He eventually wrestled on the South African independent circuit as Z-Max, a character based on The Karate Kid.

He worked in Philadelphia with Paul Lloyd Jr., known as the tag team Pure Juice. He also wrestled as Dameon Duke in World Wrestling Professionals. While there, he won the WWP World Heavyweight Championship by defeating Tornado in 2007 and lost it to Fury the following year.

=== World Wrestling Entertainment / WWE (2010-2016) ===
==== Florida Championship Wrestling (2010–2012) ====
Leppan debuted at a Florida Championship Wrestling (FCW) house show under his real name on 12 February 2010, in a losing effort against David Otunga. He made his televised debut two weeks later, losing to Curt Hawkins.

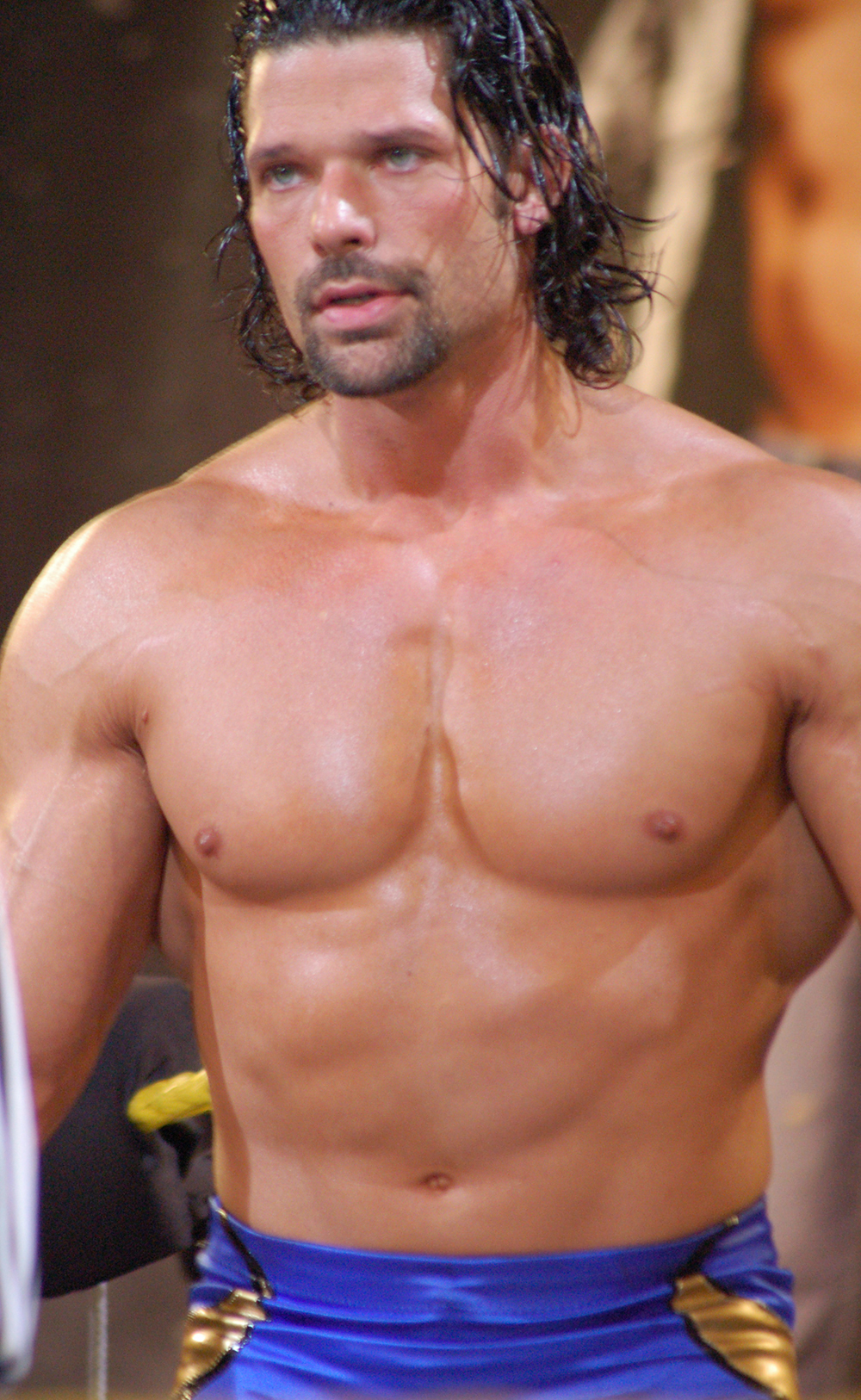
Kruger during an FCW event in February 2011

The following week, Leppan changed his ring name to Leo Kruger, chosen as a tribute to his relative and former President of South Africa Paul Kruger, before losing to Johnny Curtis. On 25 March, Kruger picked up his first televised win by defeating Jacob Novak. At the television tapings on 20 May, Kruger challenged the former Paul Lloyd, Jr. and fellow South African wrestler, Justin Gabriel to a match. At the television tapings on 10 June, Kruger lost to Gabriel, before defeating him in a rematch on 1 July. In mid-2010, Kruger formed a team with Derrick Bateman, known as The Handsome Man Express. The duo challenged Los Aviadores (Hunico and Epico) for the FCW Florida Tag Team Championship on 2 July, but were unsuccessful. On 8 July, Kruger teamed with Tyler Reks to challenge Los Aviadores again for the championship, but was unsuccessful. Kruger then went on a winning streak, defeating Big E Langston, Bateman, Austin Watson, Husky Harris, and Wes Brisco, before finally losing in a mixed tag team match, when he and Kaitlyn lost to Brad Maddox and Jamie Keyes on 9 September. Kruger's final match in 2010 was at the television tapings on 23 September, when he lost to Bo Rotundo. Following the match, Kruger lost feeling in his arm, and it was discovered that he had broken his neck. While recuperating, Kruger became a commentator for the FCW television program.

After Bo Rotundo was injured in September 2011, his FCW Florida Heavyweight Championship was vacated and a tournament set up to determine the new champion. Kruger defeated Percy Watson to make it to the final, a fatal four-way match against Husky Harris, Damien Sandow, and Dean Ambrose. Kruger won the match and the championship, his first in FCW. Kruger then appeared in dark matches prior to the SmackDown television tapings on 20 and 27 September, losing to Trent Barreta and defeating Johnny Curtis respectively. Kruger successfully defended the championship against Harris on 24 October episode of FCW television and on 14 November episode of FCW television, Kruger defeated Harris and Richie Steamboat in a triple threat match to retain the FCW Florida Heavyweight Championship. On 18 December episode of FCW television, Kruger successfully defended the championship against Seth Rollins, after interference from Antonio Cesaro.

In late December 2011, Kruger appeared at several WWE house shows, losing to Alex Riley on 27 and 28 December. On 30 December, he teamed with Riley and Mason Ryan to defeat Tyler Reks, Curt Hawkins, and JTG in a six-man tag team match at a Raw brand house show. On 2 February 2012, Kruger lost the FCW Florida Heavyweight Championship to Mike Dalton. He regained the championship from Dalton three weeks later on 23 February, but lost it that same night to Seth Rollins.

==== NXT (2012–2014) ====
When WWE rebranded its developmental territory, FCW, into NXT Wrestling, Kruger's NXT television debut took place on 27 June 2012 episode of the rebooted WWE NXT taped at Full Sail University, where he defeated Aiden English. On 1 August episode of NXT, Kruger was inserted into the Gold Rush Tournament to crown the first NXT Champion, where he was defeated by Richie Steamboat in the quarter-finals. In September, Kruger's character was altered into that of a deranged hunter and mercenary. In December, Kruger formed an alliance with Kassius Ohno; Kruger and Ohno defeated Tyson Kidd and Justin Gabriel on 2 January 2013 episode of NXT. On 16 January episode of NXT, Kruger defeated Trent Baretta. On 30 January episode of NXT, Ohno and Kruger entered the NXT Tag Team Championship Tournament to crown the inaugural champions and defeated Alex Riley and Derrick Bateman in the first round. On 6 February episode of NXT, Kruger and Ohno were defeated by Adrian Neville and Oliver Grey in the semi-finals. Kruger then moved on to feud with Justin Gabriel when he attempted to attack Gabriel's injured partner, Tyson Kidd; Kruger won the series of matches 2–1. Kruger next set his sights on Bo Dallas's NXT Championship. On 18 July NXT, Kruger won a triple threat match against Sami Zayn and Antonio Cesaro to become number one contender. On 7 August, Kruger fought Dallas for NXT Championship, but lost. Kruger eventually feuded with Zayn with the feud culminated in Zayn winning a two-out-of-three falls match on 1 January 2014 NXT.

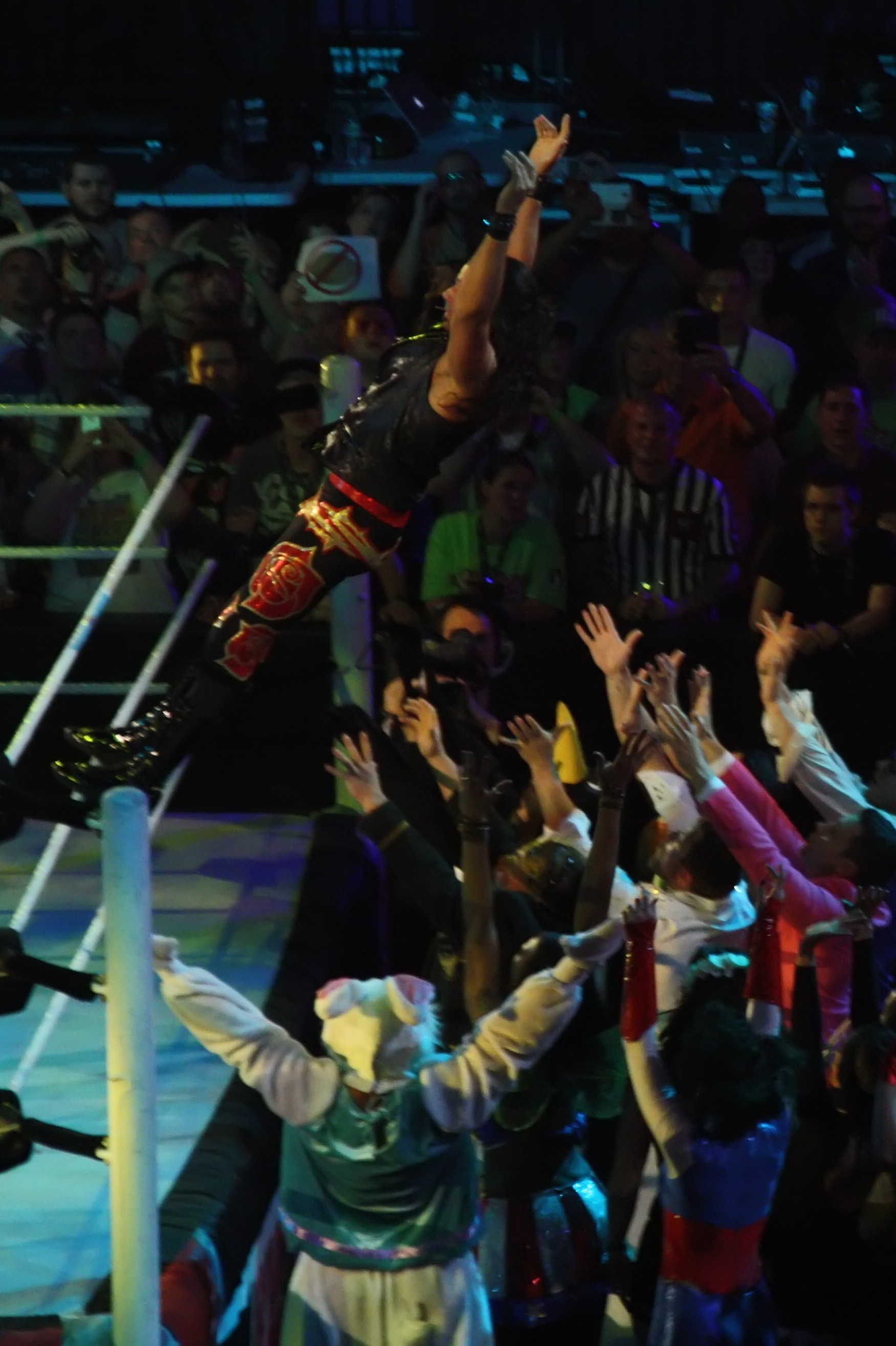
Rose (top) being caught by the Rosebuds during his ring entrance in May 2014

Leppan was then removed from television, and began wrestling at house shows as a new character called Adam Rose. As Rose, he returned to television on 6 March 2014 episode of NXT, with his new character being an organiser of parties with various colourful costumed party-goers, who accompany him during his ring entrance. Rose's supporters are called Rosebuds. The Rose character is loosely based on comedian Russell Brand.

In August 2014, within NXT, Rose and Sami Zayn participated in a tournament for an opportunity at the NXT Tag Team Championship, defeating Justin Gabriel and Tyson Kidd in the first round, but they lost in the second round to Lucha Dragons (Kalisto and Sin Cara), with the Adam Rose character being pinned for the first time. On 4 September episode of NXT, Rose suffered his first singles loss at the hands of Tyson Kidd.

==== The Exotic Express (2014–2015) ====
After WrestleMania XXX, Raw on 7 April, WWE aired introductory vignettes for Rose. Rose made his main roster debut on the 5 May episode of Raw, by interrupting Zeb Colter and Jack Swagger. Rose continued to distract Swagger during his matches, leading to Swagger losing. Rose wrestled his first Raw match on the 26 May episode of Raw in a winning effort against Damien Sandow. During the match Swagger and Colter interfered, holding one of Rose's party members hostage. Rose saved his friend after winning the match despite the distraction. Rose defeated Swagger on the 30 May episode of SmackDown and the 2 June episode of Raw. Rose made his first pay-per-view appearance at Money in the Bank where he defeated Damien Sandow. On the Battleground pre-show, Rose defeated Fandango. After over a month of inactivity, Rose returned on 1 September episode of Raw, where he defeated Titus O'Neil.

On 22 September episode of Raw, Rose teamed with his popular Rosebud, The Bunny (a 'highly athletic individual' in a rabbit suit) for the first time, as they defeated Heath Slater and Titus O'Neil. On the 15th Anniversary episode of SmackDown for 10 October, Rose suffered his first main roster loss at the hands of Kane.

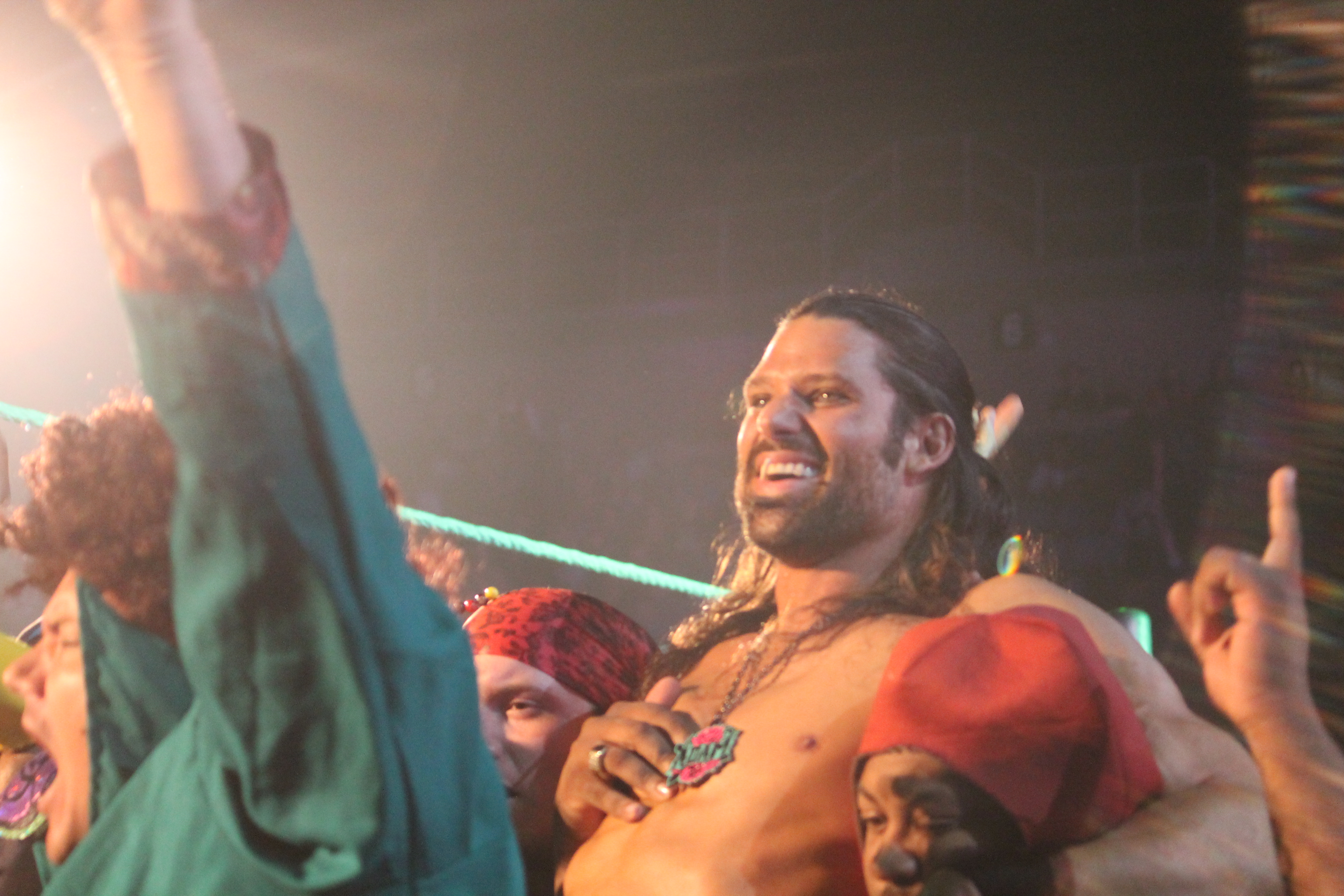
Adam Rose in September 2014

"... they have made him a cheesy party boy made uncool from the beginning by Michael Cole's dorky commentary and dancing".

— Shawn Valentino of the Pro Wrestling Torch Newsletter

On 31 October episode of SmackDown, WWE teased dissension between Rose and The Bunny when R-Truth hinted that The Bunny was upstaging Rose. After The Bunny cost Rose a match, The Bunny was assaulted and abandoned by Rose, but continued supporting Rose for his next match and often started causing Rose to lose some matches after the attempts to help him out backfired. In response, Rose allowed The Bunny to submit to Tyson Kidd during an "inter-species" match, rather than saving him when Kidd placed him in the sharpshooter. The Bunny teamed up with Rose at Survivor Series to take on Slater Gator (Heath Slater and Titus O'Neil) in a tag team match. The Bunny won the match but Rose was clearly displeased. The Bunny and Rose then failed to win a tag team turmoil match, which granted the winners a shot at the WWE Tag Team Championship. In December 2014, the Bunny won a Slammy Award; Rose later explained in a podcast how he had found him in Times Square and hired him.

Rose feuded with Kane, with Kane defeating him and The Bunny sustaining a neck injury from receiving a tombstone piledriver when he was just helping out Rose. On 22 December episode of Raw, Rose snapped after a quick loss to R-Truth and viciously attacked The Bunny, turning heel in the process; this beat down marked The Bunny's last appearance. As part of his heel turn, Rose started to push around his Rosebuds, behaving like a bully. He next feuded with the returning Zack Ryder, with the pair exchanging victories and using Twitter to insult one another, with even William Shatner (whom Rose called "Dad") joining in. Rose was one of the participants in the Second Annual André the Giant Memorial Battle Royal at WrestleMania 31. Rose however did not win the match.

In late April, Fandango split away from Rosa Mendes and Adam Rose was seen talking to her. A week later, Rosa cost Fandango a match with Rose, and became Rose's valet instead after a kiss. On 14 May Rose informed his Rosebuds that the party was "officially over", at this point completely ending his "Party animal" gimmick.

==== Various storylines and departure (2015–2016) ====
On 22 June episode of Raw, Rose's gimmick was slightly altered to a pompous artiste, exclaiming that the WWE Universe had no idea of true art or passion, hyping up the reveal of his "masterpiece" in the process. The storyline was never resolved. Rose re-emerged on 29 August episode of Main Event, sporting generic black boots and tights, a plain grey shirt, glasses, and an altered gimmick again. Though he eventually submitted to Jack Swagger, he declared in a pre-match promo his intentions to "poop on everybody's party". On 5 October episode of Raw, Rose shared a "cryptic message", saying, "All I wanted to do was put smiles on little children's faces. Well, poop." The camera then tilted down onto what seemed to be the Bunny's mascot head. On 3 November edition of Main Event, during and after defeating Fandango, this mystery bunny person was seen at ringside leaving Rose surprised. Rose formed a tag team with Brad Maddox. However, the team would be short-lived as Maddox was released from his contract on 25 November. Following Maddox being released from the company, on 30 November 2015 edition of Raw, Rose debuted a Hollywood Minute-inspired segment entitled The Rose Bush, in which he started talking about all the "dirt" in WWE.

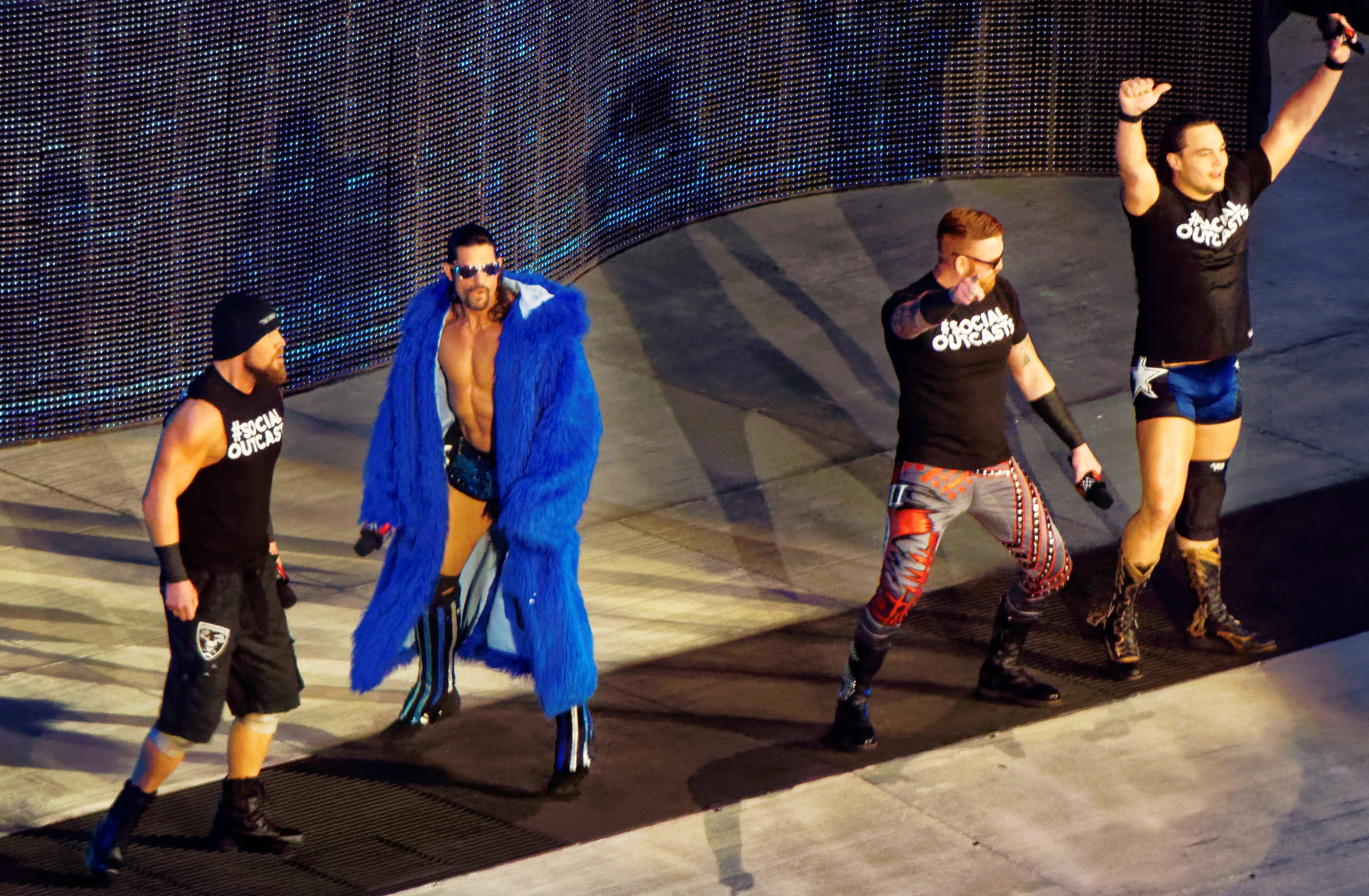
The Social Outcasts in April 2016

On 4 January episode of Raw, Rose, along with Heath Slater, Curtis Axel and Bo Dallas, debuted as a new stable and went on to assist Slater in defeating Dolph Ziggler. On 11 January episode of Raw, now billed as The Social Outcasts, the group would face The Wyatt Family to a no contest when Ryback interfered. On 24 January 2016 SmackDown, the four defeated the team of Goldust, Damien Sandow, Jack Swagger and Zack Ryder in an eight-man tag match. On 8 February episode of Raw, Rose defeated Titus O'Neil. At WrestleMania 32, Rose competed in the Andre the Giant Memorial Battle Royal, but was eliminated by the eventual winner Baron Corbin. On 11 April episode of Raw, Rose lost to Apollo Crews in what would be his final match in WWE.

On 16 April 2016, WWE announced that Leppan was suspended for 60 days after his second violation of the company's Wellness Program. Four days later on 20 April, Leppan publicly addressed his suspension as "not right", saying "I did not do anything knowingly wrong and was taking prescribed medication that my [doctor] and I followed all the correct protocol on". On 3 May, Leppan posted a doctor's handwritten note on his Twitter feed, indicating that he had been prescribing Leppan Adderall XR to treat ADHD. Leppan wrote that WWE had known he had the prescription for over a year. Three weeks later on 11 May, Leppan was arrested in Hillsborough County, Florida for domestic violence and tampering with a witness. Later that day, WWE announced that as a result, Leppan had been suspended indefinitely. Leppan requested his release from WWE and on 23 May 2016, the company announced that it was granted. On 14 June 2016 all charges against Leppan were dropped.

=== Later career and retirement (2016–2019) ===
After his release, Leppan announced his new ring name as Aldo Rose, maintaining the party host gimmick, but as an edgier character. His first match after his release took place on 23 July, losing a match against fellow WWE alumnus Damien Sandow. Rose took an absence from the professional wrestling industry in November. In January 2017, Rose addressed his absence from the industry, stating he had been with his family, and his social media was hacked. In addition, he announced that he had "killed off" the Adam Rose character and returned to his Leo Kruger persona, now renamed Krugar. Since then, however, he began to compete both under the Adam Rose and Krugar name.

On 25 March 2017, Rose defeated Aaron Orion to become the Championship International Wrestling Heavyweight Champion; however, Rose lost the title to Orion the next day. On 21 April, Rose defeated CJ O'Doyle and Axx Clover to become the new Atomic Wrestling Entertainment Heavyweight Champion.

On 18 March 2019, Leppan announced his retirement from pro wrestling, saying that he would be fulfilling the rest of his current bookings, not taking any more after that. In his retirement match on June 14, 2019, for the Atomic Revolutionary Wrestling promotion against Bull James, at ARW's 3rd annual Star Spangled event in Cocoa, Florida, Rose lost via submission when James reversed an attempted submission into a crossface.

== Other media ==
Rose is included as downloadable content for the video game WWE 2K15, and is also playable in WWE 2K16 and mobile game WWE SuperCard.

In May 2015, a documentary by E:60 titled "Behind the Curtain", aired on ESPN, focusing on Leppan, Austin Watson (Xavier Woods), Matthew Polinsky (Corey Graves), and their time in WWE's developmental system, NXT.

== Personal life ==
Leppan has two sons, Maverick and Levi. Maverick was born in 2011 with an omphalocele (a rare abdominal wall defect), and needed immediate surgery after being born to correct the defect. By the age of three, Maverick had outlived his prognosis, had four operations, and needed to be fed through a tube linked to his stomach. Levi was born in 2014.

Leppan is a Christian.

=== Controversy ===
On 11 May 2016, Leppan was arrested in Lutz, Florida by the Hillsborough County Sheriff's Office for tampering with a witness (domestic) and battery domestic assault. The incident took place at 1:30 am ET. The following day at 4:10 pm ET, Leppan was released from custody on a bond of $1,000. WWE officials suspended Leppan indefinitely, citing their "Zero Tolerance" policy for domestic abuse, and would later grant him his request for a release. On 14 June 2016, all charges against Leppan were dropped.

On 17 June 2016, Leppan garnered controversy after releasing a T-shirt via the Pro Wrestling Tees website that featured the mugshot from his domestic violence arrest. Leppan wrote on his Twitter saying "To those who were offended by the mug shot t-shirt... I wasn't. It represented the lowest point in my life and no crime was ever committed". "It represented over coming and pardon the expression but taking a lemon and turning it into lemonade. So bite on my lemon! Get a life!". He also explained that the idea for the shirt came from his wife. The shirt has since been removed from the website.

== Championships and accomplishments ==
- Atomic Revolutionary Wrestling
  - ARW Heavyweight Championship (1 time)
  - ARW Next Level Championship (1 time)
- Atomic Wrestling Entertainment
  - AWE Heavyweight Championship (1 time)
- Blue Water Championship Wrestling
  - BWCW Heavyweight Championship (1 time)
- Championship International Wrestling
  - CIW Heavyweight Championship (1 time)
- Florida Championship Wrestling
  - FCW Florida Heavyweight Championship (2 times)
- Pro Wrestling Illustrated
  - Ranked No. 77 of the top 500 singles wrestlers in the PWI 500 in 2012
- World Wrestling Professionals
  - WWP World Heavyweight Championship (1 time)
- Wrestling Observer Newsletter
  - Worst Gimmick (2014)
