= Angélico =

South African professional wrestler

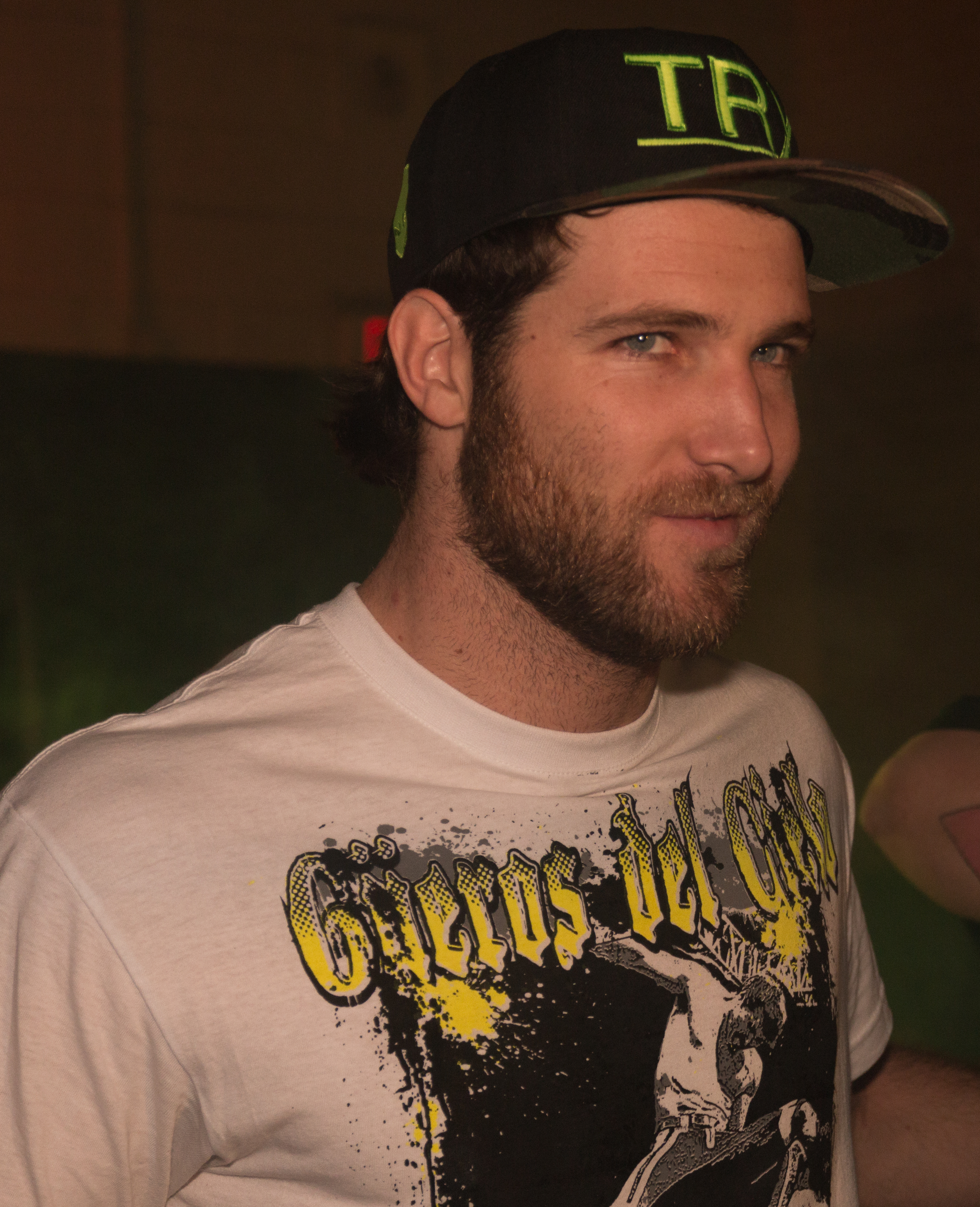
- Angélico in 2015

Personal information
- Born: Adam Bridle; 7 May 1987 (age 39) Johannesburg, Transvaal, South Africa

Professional wrestling career
- Ring name(s): Adam Angel; Adam Bridle; Adam Croft; Angélico; Backpacker Joe; El Angélico
- Billed height: 6 ft 3 in (191 cm)
- Billed weight: 213 lb (97 kg)
- Billed from: Barcelona, Spain; Johannesburg, South Africa
- Trained by: Último Dragón; Negro Navarro; Black Terry
- Debut: 2007

Adam Bridle (born 7 May 1987), better known by the ring name "Angélico" (/ɑːnˈhɛlɪkoʊ/ AHN-heli-coh), is a South African professional wrestler. He is signed to All Elite Wrestling (AEW), where he is an in-ring talent and a producer. He is also known for his work in Lucha Libre AAA Worldwide (AAA), Lucha Underground and World Wrestling Professionals (WWP).

== Professional wrestling career ==
=== Early career (2007–2010) ===
Bridle started his career in 2007 in the short-lived Pro Wrestling Alliance: Africa promotion which was co-owned by Booker T. He debuted under the name Adam Crow before changing it to Angélico, going by the nicknames The Blonde Superman and The Spanish Sensation. When PWA:Africa folded in 2007 due to internal problems, Angélico joined World Wrestling Professionals, a promotion with nationally broadcast television shows in South Africa and India. He toured with WWP and has participated in two of their television shoots, in WWP Thunderstrike and 100% De Dhana Dhan.

Angélico spent six months wrestling in Spain working for numerous independents, including Nu Wrestling Evolution (NWE). His first link to lucha libre was working with Último Dragón and Súper Nova in NWE. In his NWE big show debut on 13 July 2008, Angélico lost to NWE World Champion Orlando Jordan. On 18 July 2008, he lost to Orlando Jordan in a handicap match teaming with El Nazareno. He lost to Juventud Guerrera on 20 July 2008 with Annie Social as his new valet. At an Eventos de Wrestling Europeos card on 26 July 2008, Angélico lost to LSK in an NWL Spanish Championship match. On 13 September 2008, Angélico wrestled three matches on an inter-promotional event pitting the Spanish EWE against the Mexican AAA. He defeated Luka Scott, went to a double count-out with Red Devil, and was defeated in a tag team match pairing with Octagón against Pirata Morgan and Red Devil. Angélico's final match with NWE before becoming a mainstay in Mexico came on 2 November 2008, losing to Vito.

On 21 February 2009, he lost to Jason Steele in one of his biggest matches in WWP. One of his most notable feuds was with WWP wrestler Ananzi throughout 2008 and 2009, and on 22 November 2009 he took part in a ladder match that was edited heavily due to the network, Colours TV, considering most of the match to be too violent for primetime television. On 10 January 2010, he was awarded the previously-vacant WWP Cruiserweight World Championship, becoming the fourth champion in the title's history.

=== Toryumon (2008–2012) ===
Angélico received training from Último Dragón in 2009 and subsequently joined the Toryumon promotion. His Mexican debut took place on 14 December 2008, losing to Satoshi Kajiwara in the torneo cibernetico final of the Young Dragons Cup, an annual tournament in Toryumon showcasing the students of Último Dragón. On 1 March 2009, in a six-man tag team match, he defeated Loco Max, Shigeo Okumura & Skandalo. At Toryumon's Dragonmania IV event on 22 August 2009, he won his first dragon scramble. On 18 October 2009, he teamed with Solar I and Último Dragón to defeat Juventud Guerrera, Negro Navarro and Trauma I. On 20 December 2009, Angélico challenged unsuccessfully for the NWE Cruiserweight Title held by Juventud Guerrera on a Toryumon card. On 17 December 2010, Angélico returned to Mexico, after a nine-month stint in Europe, taking part in Toryumon's 2010 Young Dragons Cup. After surviving the torneo cibernetico portion of the tournament, Angélico defeated Trauma I in the finals to win the Cup. On 27 February 2010, Angélico took part in Toryumon's Yamaha Cup at the Sala del Armas Magdalena Mixhuca del Distrito Federal, teaming with Hijo del Fantasma. In the semi-finals, Angélico and Fantasma defeated Brazo de Oro and Brazo de Platino to advance. In the finals of the tag team tournament and one of Angélico's biggest matches to date, they beat Los Guerreros del Infierno (Rey Bucanero and Último Guerrero), with Angélico going over Bucanero after executing an armbar submission. On 12 March 2012, Angélico and Último Dragón won the 2012 Yamaha Cup.

=== International Wrestling Revolution Group (2009–2012) ===
Angélico joined IWRG in 2009 and was trained by Negro Navarro and Black Terry, primarily in the art of submissions. 18 April 2009 saw Angélico face two of his trainers in a tag team match when he teamed with Super Astro to defeat Negro Navarro and Black Terry. On 25 June 2009, Angélico teamed with Negro Navarro and Bobby Lee, Jr., losing to Fuerza Guerrera, Juventud Guerrera and Ricky Cruz by disqualification. On 7 January 2010, he teamed with Solar I and Ultraman Jr. to beat Negro Navarro, Trauma I and Trauma II. One week later on 14 January 2010, he teamed up with El Pantera and Solar I, defeating Negro Navarro, Bomber Infernal and El Hijo de Pirata Morgan shortly before he would challenge for Negro Navarro's South American Light Heavyweight Championship. He beat his teacher Negro Navarro on 21 January 2010, to become the new South American Light Heavyweight Champion. On 28 February 2010, Angélico was part of a multi-man Steel Cage elimination match where the loser among the final two participants would have to face Chico Che in the main event. Angélico was the second to be eliminated, with 911 beating El Hijo del Diablo to win the match. He would lose the South America Light Heavyweight Championship to Trauma I in his first defense on 11 March 2010. In the start of 2012, Angélico and Dinamic Black participated in the El Protector tournament losing to Centurion and Negro Navarro in the quarter-finals. On 29 April, Angélico and Los Traumas won the Triangular de Tercias, defeating Eterno, Factor and Spartan in the final.

=== Lucha Libre AAA Worldwide (2011, 2013–2017) ===
On 21 March 2011, Angélico made his debut for Lucha Libre AAA Worldwide (AAA), competing in a six-man tag team match, where he, Argenis and Fénix defeated Dark Dragon, Polvo de Estrellas and Tito Santana. In March 2013, Angélico began working regularly for AAA, making his return in the semi-finals of the AAA Fusión Championship tournament. Since returning, Angélico often teams up with Jack Evans under the team name Los Güeros del Cielo ("The Sky Blondes"). Their first PPV match came at AAA's biggest show of the year, Triplemanía XXI, in a five-way elimination tag team match for the vacant AAA World Tag Team Championship. On 18 October 2013, at Héroes Inmortales VII, Angélico and Evans won a four-way match to become the new AAA World Tag Team Champions. At Triplemanía XXII, both Angélico and Evans were part of a ten-way elimination match to unify the AAA Fusión and AAA Cruiserweight Championships. On 7 December 2014, at Guerra de Titanes Angélico and Evans lost the AAA World Tag Team Championships to Joe Líder and Pentagón Jr. in a three-way tag team match that also included Fénix and Myzteziz. Angélico and Evans regained the title from Líder and Pentagón Jr. in a three-way match, also involving Daga and Steve Pain, on 4 October 2015, at Héroes Inmortales IX. They vacated the title on 22 January 2016, due to Angélico suffering a leg injury. On 17 July 2016, Angélico and Evans won the AAA World Tag Team Championship for the third time. They lost the title on 28 August 2016, at Triplemanía XXIV against Drago and Aerostar. On 24 November 2017, Angélico announced his departure from AAA and Mexico altogether.

=== Wrestling New Classic (2012) ===
Bridle made his Japanese debut on 30 August 2012, when he, working under the ring name "Backpacker Joe", teamed with El Hijo del Pantera and Lin Byron in a six-person tag team match, where they defeated Josh O'Brien, Takuya Kito and Yusuke Kodama, with Bridle pinning O'Brien for the win. Following the match, Bridle reintroduced himself as "Adam Angel", starting a partnership and a romance storyline with Lin Byron. Angel and Byron were victorious in intergender tag team matches against the teams of Sonoko Kato and Takuya Kito, and Mio Shirai and Takuya Kito, before suffering their first defeat at the hands of Akira and Syuri on 22 September. On 26 October, Angel entered the WNC Championship tournament, but was eliminated in his first round match by Akira. Afterwards, Angel announced that the match signaled the end of his first tour of WNC.

=== Lucha Underground (2014–2018) ===
Angélico made his television debut on Lucha Underground on 14 January 2015 broadcast in a 4-way Elimination match against Argenis, Aero Star and Cage. Later on, he exchanged victories with Ivelisse and Son of Havoc. On 8 February, Angélico, Ivelisse and Son of Havoc won a tournament to become the inaugural Lucha Underground Trios Champions. During the time Angélico, Havoc and Ivelisse held the championships, they defended and successfully retained them against The Crew (Cortez, Cisco and Bael) in a ladder match on the 20 May episode of Lucha Underground, and against DelAvar Daivari and Big Ryck, & Cage, on 3 June episode. On 29 July, at Ultima Lucha Part 1, they lost the championships to The Disciples of Death (Barrio Negro, Trece and El Sinestro de la Muerte), due to interference from Catrina. They regained the title on 22 November. They would later lose the titles once again due to Angélico suffering an unfortunate injury and Son of Havoc and Ivelisse being forced to defend the titles on their own. After a lengthy absence, Angélico made his return at Ultima Lucha where he attacked Johnny Mundo. On 11 April 2018 Angélico announced his departure from the Lucha Underground.

=== Pro Wrestling Guerrilla (2015) ===
Angelico made his debut for PWG on 24 July at Threemendous IV teaming with Jack Evans unsuccessfully challenging the Young Bucks for the PWG World Tag Team Championship. The first night of Battle of Los Angeles 2015 he and Jack Evans defeated The Inner City Machine Guns (Ricochet and Rich Swann). He then entered the tournament being eliminated by Jack Evans in the first round. The next day Angelico alongside Fénix, Ricochet and Rich Swann were defeated by Mount Rushmore 2.0 (Young Bucks, Roderick Strong and Super Dragon).

=== Westside Xtreme Wrestling (2016–2018) ===
Angelico debuted for wXw entering the 16 Carat Gold 2016, he defeated Trevor Lee in the first round but lost to Drew Galloway in the quarter-finals. Angelico and Jack Evans entered to the World Tag Team League 2016, they end with 1 wins and 2 losses failing to win the tournament. In May 2017, Angelico win the wXw Shotgun Title against Rey Fenix, Penta El Zero M and the champion Emil Sitoci. He lost the championship in July against David Starr in a triple threat match that also includes Emil Sitoci. Angelico then participated in Shortcut to the Top 2017 failing to win the match. In October 2018, Angelico and Jeff Cobb entered the World Tag Team League 2018, they end with 1 wined and two losses failing to win their block.

=== What Culture Pro Wrestling (2017) ===
Angelico made his debut for WCPW on 21 July defeating Drake. Angelico then qualified for the Pro Wrestling World Cup by defeating Icarus in the first round and Morgan Webster in the final. At the tournament, Angelico was defeated by Ricochet in the first round. On 28 August, Angelico was defeated by Drake in a rematch. The next day he and Ricochet unsuccessfully challenged War Machine for the WCPW Tag Team Championships.

=== All Elite Wrestling / Ring of Honor (2019–present) ===
On 8 May 2019, it was reported that Angelico had signed with All Elite Wrestling (AEW). He would reform his team with Jack Evans, now known as The Hybrid2. The team made their debut at AEW's inaugural pay-per-view event Double or Nothing on May 25, losing to Best Friends (Trent Beretta and Chuck Taylor). At Fight for the Fallen on July 13, The Hybrid2 competed in a three-way tag team match against Jungle Boy and Luchasaurus and The Dark Order (Evil Uno and Stu Grayson), which the Dark Order won. At the All Out "Buy In" pre-show on August 31, The Hybrid2 lost to Private Party (Isiah Kassidy and Marq Quen). Angélico obtained his first win in AEW on the October 8 episode of AEW Dark, teaming with Evans and the Lucha Brothers (Fénix and Pentagón Jr.) to defeat Best Friends and Private Party in an eight-man tag team match. He has continued wrestling sporadically for both AEW and its sister promotion Ring of Honor. In August 2025, it was reported that Angelico had begun working as a backstage producer.

== Championships and accomplishments ==
- German Wrestling Federation
  - GWF Berlin Championship (1 time)
  - GWF Light Heavyweight World Cup (2018)
  - GWF Battlefield Winner (2019)
- International Wrestling Revolution Group
  - South American Light Heavyweight Championship (1 time)
  - Triangular de Tercias (2012)
- Lucha Libre AAA Worldwide
  - AAA World Tag Team Championship (3 times) – with Jack Evans
- Lucha Underground
  - Lucha Underground Trios Championship (2 times, inaugural) – with Ivelisse and Son of Havoc
  - Lucha Underground Trios Championship Tournament (2015) – with Ivelisse and Son of Havoc
- Pro Wrestling Illustrated
  - PWI ranked him #117 of the top 500 singles wrestlers in the PWI 500 in 2015
- Swiss Wrestling Entertainment
  - SWE King of Switzerland Championship (1 time)
- Toryumon Mexico
  - Yamaha Cup (2010) – with Hijo del Fantasma
  - Yamaha Cup (2012) – with Último Dragón
  - Young Dragons Cup (2010)
- Westside Xtreme Wrestling
  - wXw Shotgun Championship (1 time)
- World Wrestling Professionals
  - WWP World Cruiserweight Championship (1 time)
- Xtreme Zone Wrestling
  - XZW Gen-X Championship (1 time)

=== Luchas de Apuestas record ===
Winner (wager)	Loser (wager)	Location	Event	Date	Notes
Angélico (hair) and Jack Evans (hair)	Dark Cuervo (hair) and Dark Escoria (hair)	Monterrey, Nuevo León	Verano de Escándalo	June 14, 2015	(Note: Steel cage match.)
