= WWP World Tag Team Championship =

Professional wrestling tag team championship

Details
- Promotion: World Wrestling Professionals
- Date established: April 2004
- Current champion: Inactive
- Date won: 24 December 2018
Statistics
- First champions: The Coalminers (Blacksmith and Woodcarver)
- Most reigns: 2 (The Coalminers)
- Longest reign: Ananzi (Due to partner switch is the longest tag team champion)
- Shortest reign: The Coalminers

The WWP World Tag Team Championship is a professional wrestling championship in the South African professional wrestling promotion World Wrestling Professionals, contested among tag teams of any weight. It was created in April 2004 when WWP debuted its television show, WWP Thunderstrike.

== Title history ==
Wrestlers:	Times:	Date:	Location:	Notes:
The Coalminers (Blacksmith and Woodcarver)	1	April 2004	Johannesburg, South Africa	
Tornado	1	May 2004	Johannesburg, South Africa	Won in a handicap match.
The Coalminers (Blacksmith and Woodcarver)	2	November 2004	Johannesburg, South Africa	
Ananzi and Danie Brits	1	January 2005	Johannesburg, South Africa	
Ananzi and AW Bulldog	1	January 2006	Johannesburg, South Africa	Due to Danie Brits' failure to appear for a scheduled title defense, Ananzi announced that AW Bulldog would be his new tag team partner and co-holder of the WWP Tag Team World Title.
Road Rage (Fury and Rage)	1	November 2006	Johannesburg, South Africa	
Scorpion Kruger and Terri Middoux	1	November 2007	Johannesburg, South Africa	
Kilimanjaro and Kwaito Kid	1	5 December 2007	Johannesburg, South Africa	
The Weasels (Mark Beale and Blacksmith)	1	20 December 2008	Johannesburg, South Africa	
The Madalas (Tornado and Skull)	1	28 February 2009	Johannesburg, South Africa	
The French Connection	1	25 September 2009	Johannesburg, South Africa	
Scared Ice (Johnny Sabin and Vic Scar)	1	unknown	unknown	
Ananzi	1	16 December 2014	Randburg, South Africa	
Ananzi and Kilimanjaro	1	unknown	unknown	After winning the titles alone, Ananzi chose Kilimanjaro as his tag team partner and co-holder of the WWP Tag Team World Title.
Dementors of Chaos (Two Face and Dirty Jackson)	1	7 March 2015	Randfontein, South Africa	
Shaun Koen and Johnny Palazzio	1	18 July 2015	Port Elizabeth, South Africa	
The Sons of Samoa (Afa Jr. and L.A. Smooth)	1	17 April 2017	Port Elizabeth, South Africa	
Inactive		24 December 2018		

== See also ==
- World Wrestling Professionals
