= WWP World Cruiserweight Championship =

Details
- Promotion: World Wrestling Professionals
- Date established: November 1, 2007
- Current champion: Zizoux
- Date won: 2011
Statistics
- First champion: PJ Black
- Longest reign: Angélico (1825+ days)
- Shortest reign: Lizzard (1 week)
- Heaviest champion: PJ Black
- Lightest champion: Lizzard

The WWP World Cruiserweight Championship is a professional wrestling championship in the South African Professional wrestling promotion World Wrestling Professionals, contested exclusively among Cruiserweight (<100 kg (220 lb)) wrestlers. It was created on November 1, 2007, during WWP Thunderstrike's third televised season.

== Title history ==
Wrestlers:	Times:	Date:	Location:
PJ Black	1	November 1, 2007	Johannesburg, South Africa
Lizzard	1	November 14, 2007	Johannesburg, South Africa
The Playa	1	November 21, 2007	Johannesburg, South Africa
Angélico	1	January 10, 2010	Johannesburg, South Africa
Zizoux	1	2011	Johannesburg, South Africa

== See also ==
- World Wrestling Professionals
