= WWP All-Africa Heavyweight Championship =

Details
- Promotion: World Wrestling Professionals
- Date established: 21 March 2009
- Current champion: Kilimanjaro
- Date won: 27 March 2016
Statistics
- First champion: Kilimanjaro
- Most reigns: Ananzi (3)

The WWP All-Africa Heavyweight Championship is a professional wrestling championship in the South African Professional wrestling promotion World Wrestling Professionals, contested exclusively among Heavyweight (>=100 kg (220 lb)) wrestlers born in Africa. It was created on 21 March 2008 when Kilimanjaro defeated Ananzi on an episode of WWP Thunderstrike.

== Title history ==
Wrestlers:	Times:	Date:	Location:
Kilimanjaro	1	21 March 2009	Johannesburg, South Africa
Ananzi	1	25 September 2009	Johannesburg, South Africa
Ryan Cage	1	10 January 2010	Johannesburg, South Africa
Ananzi	2	9 July 2010	Johannesburg, South Africa
Zizou Middoux	1	16 December 2015	Johannesburg, South Africa
Ananzi	3	26 February 2016	Johannesburg, South Africa
Vacant		11 March 2016	
Kilimanjaro	2	26 March 2016	

== See also ==
- World Wrestling Professionals
