= WWP World Heavyweight Championship =

Details
- Promotion: World Wrestling Professionals
- Brand: CPW
- Date established: April 2004
- Date retired: 24 December 2018
Statistics
- First champion: Tornado
- Final champion: Mr. Wrestling
- Most reigns: Tornado & Mr. Wrestling (2 times)
- Longest reign: 3 years (Tornado)
- Shortest reign: 1 month (Dameon Duke)
- Oldest champion: Tornado
- Youngest champion: Dameon Duke
- Heaviest champion: Fury
- Lightest champion: Dameon Duke

The WWP World Heavyweight Championship was a professional wrestling world heavyweight championship in the South African professional wrestling promotion World Wrestling Professionals (WWP), contested exclusively among Heavyweight (>=100 kg (220 lb)) wrestlers. It was created in April 2004 when WWP debuted its television show, WWP Thunderstrike. Tornado has had the longest reign.

== Title history ==
Champion	Reign	Date	Location	Notes
Tornado	1	December 2005	Johannesburg, South Africa	
Dameon Duke	1	April 2007	Johannesburg, South Africa	
Fury	1	2 January 2008	Johannesburg, South Africa	
Vacant		9 January 2009		
Joe E. Legend	1	10 January 2009	Johannesburg, South Africa	Defeated P. J. Black.
Vacated on 10 July 2009
Tornado	2	11 July 2009	Lubambashi, Democratic Republic of Congo	Defeated Dameon Duke.
Mr. Wrestling	1	22 March 2014	Port Elizabeth, South Africa	
Markus Burke	1	16 April 2017	Port Elizabeth, South Africa	
Brody Steele	1	17 September 2017	Prince Edward Island, Canada	Defeated Markus Burke.
Mr. Wrestling	2	31 March 2018	Port Elizabeth, South Africa	Defeated Brody Steele.
Retired on 24 December 2018

== See also ==
- World Wrestling Professionals
