= Champions Pro Wrestling =

South African professional wrestling promotion

WWP- World Wrestling Promotions
- Acronym: WWP
- Founded: 2002
- Style: Sports Entertainment Professional wrestling
- Headquarters: Port Elizabeth, South Africa
- Founder: Mark Beale
- Website: Under upgrade

Champions Pro Wrestling (formerly World Wrestling Professionals) is a South African professional wrestling promotion created in 2002. The promotion was televised in South Africa from 2004 to 2009 and internationally in 2009. CPW is owned by Mark Beale, and is heavily influenced by American mainstream wrestling.

== History ==
=== Establishment ===
World Wrestling Professionals was formed in 1990 in the Eastern Cape city of Nelson Mandela Bay and re-branded to Champions Pro Wrestling in May 2019, It has hosted a number of local shows all year round, and slowly grew to become the number one wrestling federation in South Africa. It was formed by former professional wrestler Mark Beale, with the goal of taking South African wrestling to another level. In 2004, after years of hard work on the road in the hope of getting the product noticed, his idea for a wrestling show was picked up by the South African Broadcasting Corporation, and was given a national contract by SABC2. The show, called WWP Thunderstrike, ran for a number of years on the channel, and was eventually put on hold due to in-house politics.

The CPW then moved on to India to film a weekly show on Colors TV called 100% De Dana Dan, which established the WWP brand in the Middle East. The WWP-branded show WWP G-Force was then filmed and distributed to various networks, and has been shown all over Africa.

The CPW launched the biggest pro wrestling event on the African continent, the CPW wrestling extravaganza Wrestlemonster, which became an instant hit in South Africa, drawing in excess of 18,000 spectators to the event. It also launched the War of Pride extravaganza in Chandigarh, India with a huge contingent of international superstars like Bobby Lashley, Brody Steele, Carlito, Mr Wrestling, and Ananzi. The WWP continues to do roadshows through South Africa and Africa, and currently has a strong presence on the continent.

=== WWP Thunderstrike ===
Champions Pro Wrestling
- Also known as: WWP Thunderstrike
- Starring: Stars of World Wrestling Professionals
- Country of origin: South Africa
- No. of episodes: 1st Season: 20 Episodes; 2nd Season: 30 Episodes; 3rd Season: 30 Episodes; 4th Season: 20 Episodes

Production
- Camera setup: Multi-camera setup
- Running time: 60 minutes (with commercials)

Original release
- Network: SABC2
- Release: December 2004 – 28 April 2009

The promotion, which is managed by Mark Beale, aired 1-hour pre-recorded episodes for SABC2 known as WWP Thunderstrike in the 18:30–19:30PM time-slot every Saturday. It recently completed its fourth season, which began on 13 December 2008 and ended on 28 April 2009. The fourth season was taped during May. WWP Thunderstrike signed a 5-year TV contract with SABC2 during June 2009 that would have allowed them to show over 50 episodes a year until 2012, but due to in-house politics future seasons were put on hold and no new episodes have aired since the end of season 4.

WWP Thunderstrike made its television premiere in December, 2004. After just four months of airing and being the top rated sports show on SABC2, Thunderstrike was pushed one hour forward into a primetime slot (from 14:30 to 15:30). Deon Potgieter, a renowned international author and producer, was responsible creatively for the name along with many of the original storylines and wrestler personas in WWP Thunderstrike's early years. After producing and writing the first 67 episodes, Deon Potgieter withdrew his involvement from the show to produce, direct and write both seasons of the SAFTA winning hit sitcom "Family Bonds". Following his departure the WWP creative team would consist of Mark Beale, Steve Debbes and Abdul Kader.

Television tapings took place in the Urban Brew Studios in Johannesburg and each season was usually filmed for up to seven days in a row. The venue is referred to by the promotion as the Dome of Doom. The first and second seasons aired on Saturday afternoons.

The third series moved to a Wednesday night slot at 22:00, where the show attained its highest ratings to date. In season highlights, WWE developmental star Ray Leppan, who went by the name Dameon Duke, defended his newly won WWP Heavyweight World Title for most of the season and engaged in a three-match title rivalry with Joe "Fury" Steyn, who won the championship in the third match. In the season finale, WWP main eventers took part in an eight-man tag team match with the kayfabe South African defenders taking on the foreign WDP faction.

For the fourth season, SABC2 pushed the show to a primetime slot on Saturday. P. J. Black, who later went on to sign a WWE contract, was given a prominent position in the main event and feuded with Mikey Whiplash throughout the season. He went on to challenge for the WWP Heavyweight World Title against Joe E Legend but subsequently lost. The current and 2-time WWP World Heavyweight Champion Tornado formed a dream team with former arch-rival The Skull and feuded with the leaders of the WDP faction, The Weasels, with the WWP Tag Team World Title at stake during many of their matches.

Season:	Run:	Day:	Timeslot:
First season	11 December 2004 to 23 April 2005	Saturday	14:30 to 15:30
Second season	December, 2005 to April, 2006	Saturday	15:30 to 16:30
Third season	1 November 2006 to 27 February 2008	Wednesday	22:00 to 23:00
Fourth season	13 December 2008 to 28 April 2009	Saturday	18:30 to 19:30

=== 100% De Dana Dan ===
Champions Pro Wrestling
- Also known as: 100% De Dana Dan
- Starring: Stars of World Wrestling Professionals
- Country of origin: India
- No. of episodes: 1st Season: 26 Episodes

Production
- Camera setup: Multi-camera setup
- Running time: 60 minutes (with commercials)

Original release
- Network: Colors TV
- Release: 29 August – 20 December 2009

World Wrestling Professionals aired 1-hour pre-recorded episodes of 100% De Dana Dan for Colours TV every Saturday and Sunday. The first (and only) season, began on 29 August 2009, and ended on 20 December 2009. 100% De Dana Dan is a hybrid of reality television and wrestling based on 100% Lucha, and sees wrestlers from India facing wrestlers from South Africa in faction warfare. The kayfabe plot of the show involved the Indian wrestlers being trapped in South Africa and stumbling upon an underground fight league headed by Mark Beale and WWP.

WWP wrestlers Tornado, Jason Steele and Ananzi were involved in training many of the wrestlers from India. In the middle of 2009, WWP held a tryout in Bombay, India, searching for athletic candidates for the show. They selected twelve candidates to be trained before the 100% De Dana Dan television tapings in August and September.

Bollywood film stars Isha Koppikar and Sharat Saxena had roles in the show. Khoppikar participated as a live presenter while Saxena was the kayfabe manager of the Indian team.

In highlights from the first season, Tornado became the 100% Heavyweight Champion on the second show and defended the championship for most of its run until being dethroned by the much larger competitor Goonga in the final episode. Tornado won a tournament where the winner would be awarded the WWP Heavyweight World Title, but seeing as he was already the champion he retained the championship. Sando Paji defeated Tornado to win the 100% Championship but refused to accept the title and it was awarded back to Tornado. Ananzi and Jason Steele were featured prominently on the show, with Steele winning a title contender's tournament that lasted several weeks and Ananzi winning a crucial ladder match against Angelico that awarded the winning team keys to a new vehicle. A controversial angle aired where one of the wrestlers competing on the Indian team died in the ring as a result of injuries inflicted by the Nigerian wrestler Kilimanjaro, which later led to an angle where the passed wrestler returned.

Season:	Run:	Day:	Timeslot:
First season	29 August 2009 to 22 November 2009	Saturday and Sunday	21:00 to 22:00

=== Roster split (2004–2006) ===
The roster was previously divided into two factions, namely Alkebulan and Def Faxion. The kayfabe storyline entailed that the factions adopted different cultural beliefs, with Def Faxion being based on modernity and materialism, while Alkebulan bore opposite traits, deeply rooted in myth and tradition. Each faction had a championship which was regularly competed for on the WWP Thunderstrike show. The final Def Faxion Heavyweight Champion was The Blacksmith and the final Alkebulan Heavyweight Champion was Ananzi. In late 2006 with the premiere of the third season, the factions were dropped and focus was placed on traditional Heavyweight, Tag Team, Female and Cruiserweight divisions.

=== WrestleMonster (2015) ===
On 18 July 2015 WWP held the first annual WrestleMonster event. WrestlMonster II has been announced for April 2016.

=== Touring ===
Despite the promotion being mainly a product produced for television since 2004, it regularly holds road show tours in various parts of the world such as India, Democratic Republic of the Congo, Nigeria, Greece, Venezuela, Paraguay, and in their home country of South Africa. In November, 2008, WWP drew a sell-out crowd at Carnival City in Johannesburg, South Africa, a first for a South African wrestling promotion since the 1980s wrestling boom. In July, 2009, WWP drew a record 20,000 fans in Lubambashi, DRC, their biggest attendance to date.

=== Training facilities ===
World Wrestling Professionals has five training facilities scattered across South Africa. Shows are sometimes independently held by the training facilities in their respective regions showcasing their top students.

Location:	Managed by:
Wembley Arena, Durban	Tornado
Roodepoort, Johannesburg	Ananzi
Wynberg, Cape Town	Abdul Kader
Wembley Arena, East Rand	Terri Middoux
Port Elizabeth	The Blacksmith

== Championships ==
=== Active championships ===
Championship:	Champion(s):	Held since:
CPW World Heavyweight Championship	Mr. Wrestling	20 March 2018
CPW All-Africa Heavyweight Championship	TJ TREMOR	16 September 2023
CPW World Tag Team Championship	Inactive	24 December 2018
CPW World Ladies Championship	Black Widow	7 May 2017
CPW Commonwealth Championship	Ananzi	16 April 2017

=== Inactive championships ===
Championship:	Champion(s):	Won:
WWP Def Faxion Heavyweight Championship	The Blacksmith	June 2004
WWP Alkebulan Heavyweight Championship	Boerseun	December 2005
WWP World Cruiserweight Championship	Angelico	10 January 2010
WWP Hardcore Championship	Nightmare	20 July 2017
WWP Intercontinental Championship	Devon Shooter	28 August 2016
WWP Developmental Championship	Matthew Hammar	25 September 2017

== Key people ==
- Mark Beale (CEO)
- Abdul Kader (Chairman)
- Steve Debbes (Technical Co-Director)

== International partnerships ==
- Global Force Wrestling
- IHW Wrestling (Canadian Maritimes)
