= P. J. Black =

South African retired professional wrestler (born 1981)

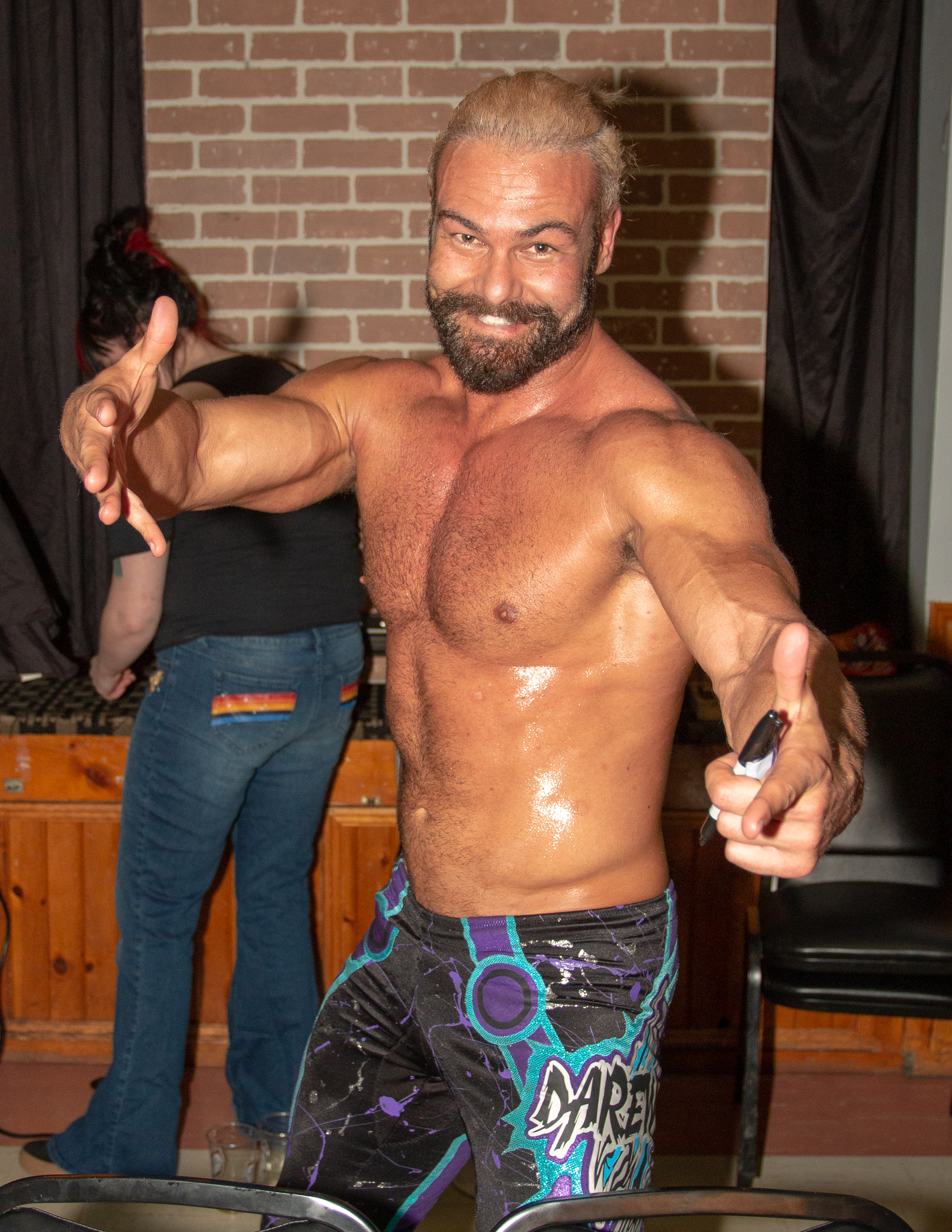
- Black in 2019

Personal information
- Born: Phillip Paul Lloyd; 3 March 1981 (age 45) Cape Town, South Africa

Professional wrestling career
- Ring name(s): The Bunny; Justin Angel; Justin Gabriel; Paul Lloyd; Paul Lloyd Jr. P. J. Black; Darewolf
- Billed height: 6 ft 1 in (185 cm)
- Billed weight: 213 lb (97 kg)
- Billed from: Cape Town, South Africa
- Trained by: Paul Lloyd; Alex Shane; Mark Sloan
- Debut: 1997
- Retired: 30 October 2026

Phillip Paul Lloyd (born 3 March 1981) is a South African retired professional wrestler. He is best known for his time in WWE, under the ring name Justin Gabriel. He also wrestled in the independent circuit under the ring name P. J. Black.

A second-generation wrestler, Lloyd was initially trained by his father. Debuting in 1997 at the age of 16, where he competed in the United Kingdom and South Africa and was the inaugural winner of the WWP World Cruiserweight Championship in World Wrestling Professionals as P. J. Black.

In 2008, Lloyd signed a developmental contract with World Wrestling Entertainment, and was assigned to Florida Championship Wrestling (FCW), WWE's developmental territory, where he won the FCW Florida Tag Team Championship, with Kris Logan, and the FCW Florida Heavyweight Championship. In February 2010, he competed in the first season of NXT, finishing third, before being called to the main roster in June 2010 joining The Nexus. He joined the Corre in 2011. Teaming regularly with Heath Slater, the duo won the WWE Tag Team Championship three times in 2010 and 2011, which was the apex of Gabriel's success with WWE. He also won the TNA King of the Mountain Championship during his brief GFW crossover appearances with Total Nonstop Action Wrestling in 2015.

== Professional wrestling career ==
=== Early career (1997–2000) ===
Lloyd was originally trained by his father, a promoter and wrestler in South Africa, who was also known by his ring name The Pink Panther. His grandfather was a professional boxer and amateur wrestler. Lloyd grew up watching his father wrestle and in the early part of his training he used to practice in the backyard of his home, in which two rings were positioned. He made his professional wrestling debut at the age of 16. Using the ring name "P. J. Black", he formed a regular tag team with Ray Leppan called Pure Juice. His father was shot and killed in front of him during Lloyd's final year in high school, and a year later he moved to the United Kingdom for five years.

=== United Kingdom and South Africa (2000–2008) ===
Lloyd spent five years in the United Kingdom, where he trained with Frontier Wrestling Alliance. He was trained by Alex Shane and Mark Sloan. In 2003 he made his FWA debut. He also made an appearance in International Pro Wrestling: United Kingdom.

He debuted for the South African promotion World Wrestling Professionals (WWP) in 2005. In 2006, he returned to South Africa full-time, and returned to WWP. His most notable feuds during his tenure in WWP were against Tornado, Dameon Duke, Mikey Whiplash, and Joe E. Legend. On 1 November 2007, Black became the promotion's inaugural World Cruiserweight Champion, by defeating The Playa in a match to determine the inaugural champion. After holding the championship for 13 days, he lost it to Lizzard on 14 November. He then declared his intentions to compete in WWP's heavyweight division. Lloyd challenged unsuccessfully for the WWP World Heavyweight Championship against Joe E Legend on a WWP Thunderstrike episode that aired on 10 January 2009. During the match he suffered minor burns to the face after a fireball spot did not go as originally planned, and he had to be treated in hospital. His final match in South Africa took place on 8 November 2008 at WWP's bi-annual Carnival City Casino show, where he was defeated by Terri Middoux in front of a record attendance.

=== World Wrestling Entertainment/WWE (2008-2015) ===
==== Florida Championship Wrestling (2008–2010) ====
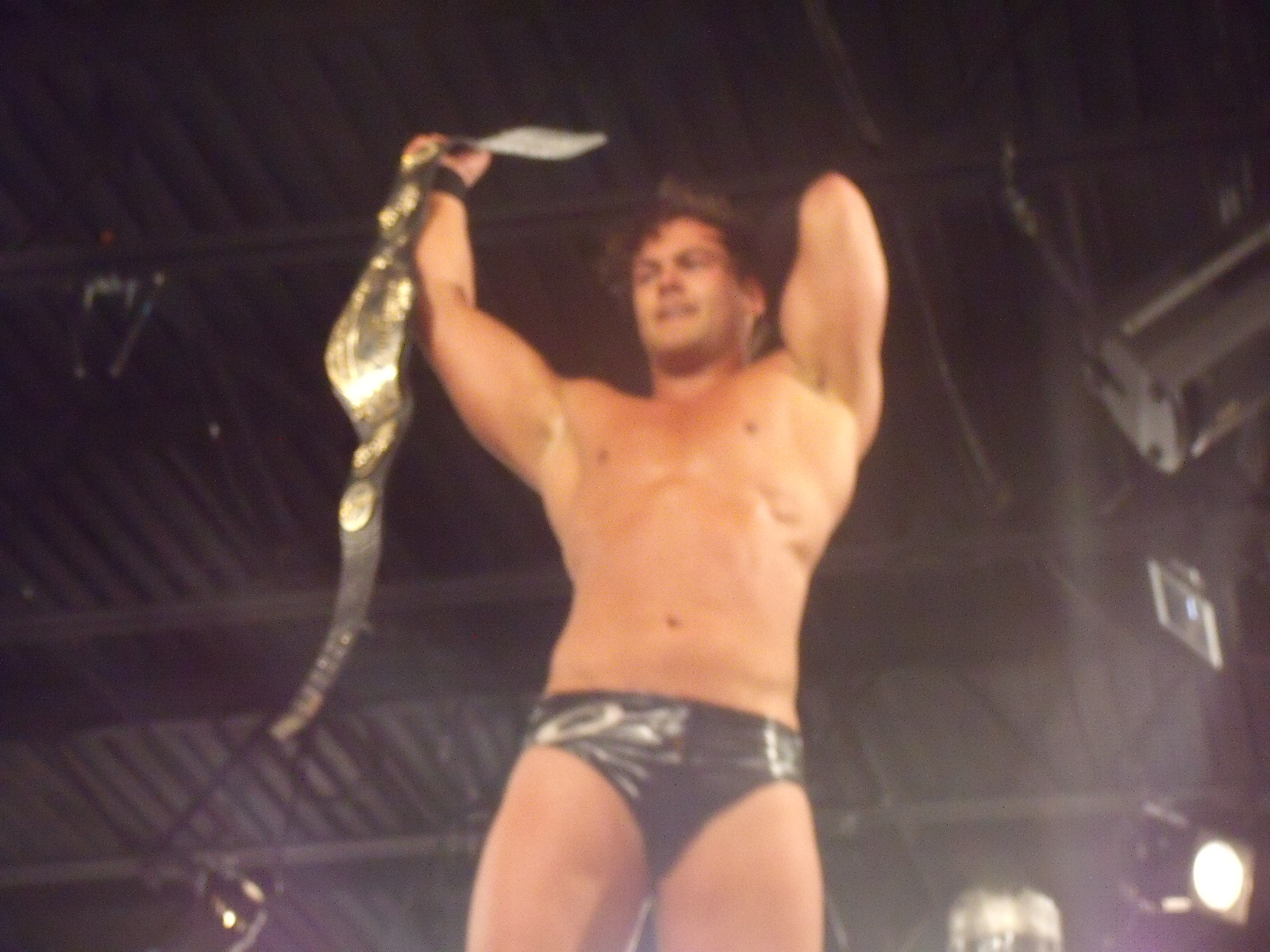
Angel as the FCW Florida Heavyweight Champion in January 2010

In 2008, Lloyd signed a three-year developmental deal with World Wrestling Entertainment (WWE), becoming the first South African person to do so. He was assigned to Florida Championship Wrestling (FCW), WWE's developmental territory, where he made his debut under the name Paul Lloyd on 5 February, in a loss to Kawal. His first win in FCW came the following week, when he teamed with Caylen Croft and Trent Barreta to defeat Tyler Reks, Johnny Curtis, and DJ Gabriel in a six-man tag team match. The following month, he changed his ring name to 'Justin Angel'. He went on to wrestle against DH Smith, Barreta, Yoshitatsu, and Lance Hoyt over the next few months. In June, he formed a tag team with Kris Logan, with the pair defeating DJ Gabriel and Vic Adams in their debut match as a team. They quickly began to feud with The Dude Busters of Barreta and Croft, losing to them in several championship matches over the next month. At the 23 July 2009 tapings of FCW's television show, Angel and Logan defeated Barreta and Croft to become the Florida Tag Team Champions. They lost the championship on the same night to The Rotundos (Bo and Duke).

Following the loss of the championship, Angel and Logan dissolved as a tag team, with Angel returning to singles competition. He went on a winning streak throughout August, defeating Alex Riley, Vance Archer, and Sheamus. Angel won the Florida Heavyweight Championship from Heath Slater in a two out of three falls match at the 24 September 2009 television tapings. He successfully defended the championship against Drew McIntyre, Eric Escobar, Slater, and Curt Hawkins throughout late 2009. In February 2010, he changed his ring name to 'Justin Gabriel' to coincide with his appearances on NXT. Further successful championship defenses occurred in early 2010, against competitors including Hawkins, Barreta, and Kaval. After a near six-month reign, Gabriel lost the championship at the 18 March television tapings, when Alex Riley won a three-way match, which also included Wade Barrett. Gabriel lost a rematch to Riley on 31 March and again on 20 May. In May, he started a feud with fellow South African Leo Kruger over who was the better wrestler. On 10 June, Gabriel beat Kruger, but Kruger reversed the result in a rematch at the 1 July television tapings, which was Gabriel's final appearance in FCW.

==== The Nexus and the Corre (2010–2011) ====
On 16 February 2010, it was announced that Angel was going to be competing on the first season of NXT under the name Justin Gabriel, with Matt Hardy as his storyline mentor. He made his in-ring debut on the 2 March 2010 episode of NXT in a tag team match with his mentor Hardy, against the team of William Regal and Skip Sheffield. Gabriel and Hardy won the match when Gabriel pinned Regal, making him the first rookie to pin a pro on the show. He went on to defeat Wade Barrett the following week, before suffering his first defeat on the 16 March 2010 episode of NXT, when he and Hardy were defeated by CM Punk and Darren Young. On 30 March, in the first Pros Poll, Gabriel was ranked third behind Daniel Bryan (first) and Wade Barrett (second). Before the first elimination, Gabriel won the Rookie Challenge earning immunity from elimination in the following Pros Poll. In that Poll, Gabriel remained in third place behind Wade Barrett (who was moved to first) and David Otunga (second). In the season finale on 1 June, Gabriel was the first eliminated, finishing in third place overall in the competition.

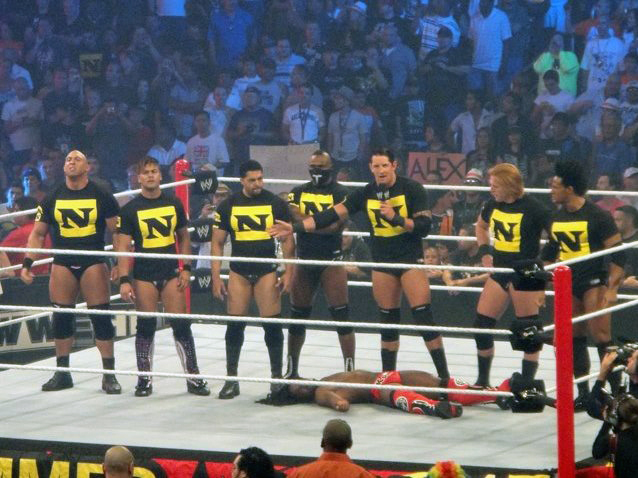
Gabriel (second from left) with the rest of The Nexus at SummerSlam

On the 7 June 2010 episode of Raw, Gabriel and the other season one NXT rookies turned heel (villainous) by interfering in the Viewer's Choice main event match between John Cena and CM Punk, attacking both competitors, the announcing team and Justin Roberts, the ring announcer before dismantling the ring area and surrounding equipment. The following week on Raw, the rookies (excluding Daniel Bryan who had been released) attacked general manager Bret Hart, when he refused to give them contracts. At the Fatal 4-Way pay-per-view, the seven rookies interfered in the WWE Championship match and cost Cena the championship. The following week on Raw, Vince McMahon fired Hart and announced the hiring of a new general manager, who had signed the seven season one NXT rookies to contracts. The following week, the group was named The Nexus. On the 12 July episode of Raw, The Nexus competed in their first match together, without Darren Young, a six–on–one handicap match against John Cena, which they won when Gabriel pinned Cena. The Nexus continued to feud with Cena and the Raw roster, resulting in a seven-on-seven elimination tag team match at SummerSlam. Gabriel was one of the final two Nexus members in the match, but Cena's team won when Cena eliminated Gabriel and then Barrett to win the match.

On 3 October 2010, Cena was forced to join The Nexus as a result of losing to Barrett at Hell in a Cell and at the following pay-per-view Bragging Rights, Cena and Otunga won the WWE Tag Team Championship. On the 25 October 2010 episode of Raw, Barrett made a tag team match, with Gabriel and Heath Slater facing Otunga and Cena for the championship. Gabriel and Slater won when Barrett ordered Otunga to allow Slater to pin him, becoming the new Tag Team Champions. Gabriel and Slater held the championship for nearly two months before losing it to Santino Marella and Vladimir Kozlov in a four-way elimination match, also involving The Usos and Mark Henry and Yoshi Tatsu on 6 December. Gabriel and Slater received a rematch for the championship at TLC: Tables, Ladders & Chairs on 19 December, but lost by disqualification when Nexus member Michael McGillicutty interfered.

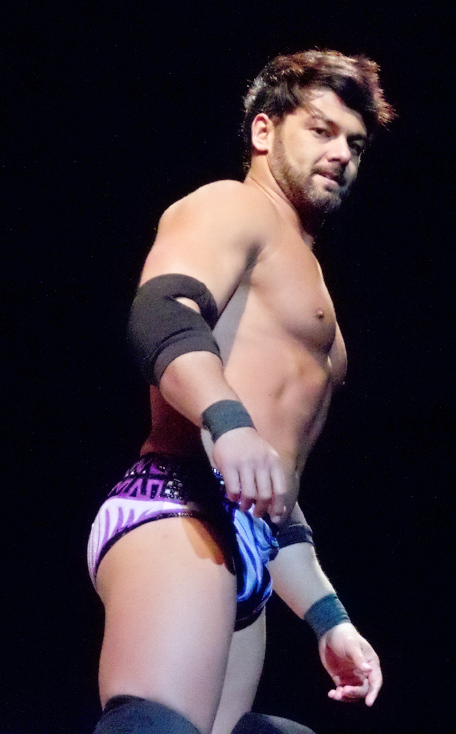
Gabriel in 2012

On the 10 January 2011 episode of Raw, Gabriel and Slater refused to take part in new Nexus leader CM Punk's initiation and walked away from the group. The following day, at the tapings of the 14 January 2011 episode of SmackDown, Gabriel and Slater helped former leader Barrett and Ezekiel Jackson attack Big Show. The following week, Gabriel, Slater, Barrett, and Jackson announced they had formed The Corre, and later that night Gabriel defeated World Heavyweight Champion Edge in a non-title match, following interference from the other members of The Corre. After winning a non-title match against the champions Kozlov and Marella on 4 February episode of SmackDown, Gabriel and Slater received a match for the WWE Tag Team Championship two weeks later, but lost via disqualification when the other members of The Corre interfered. They received a rematch at the Elimination Chamber pay-per-view on 20 February and defeated Marella and Kozlov to win the WWE Tag Team Championship for the second time. The following night on Raw, Gabriel and Slater lost the championship to John Cena and The Miz, but won the championship back minutes later after Barrett invoked The Corre's rematch clause, and The Miz turned on Cena. During this time, The Corre had continued to feud with The Big Show, and at WrestleMania XXVII in April the team of The Big Show, Kane, Santino Marella, and Kofi Kingston defeated The Corre. At the 19 April taping of SmackDown, the duo of Gabriel and Slater lost the Tag Team Championship to the team of Kane and The Big Show. In a backstage segment following the match, Gabriel was attacked by Slater, who thought Gabriel blamed him for their loss. On the 6 May episode of SmackDown, Gabriel, Barrett, and Slater attacked Jackson, removing him from the group. The three remaining members of The Corre feuded with Jackson until the 10 June episode of SmackDown, when Barrett walked out on Gabriel and Slater during a six-man tag team match against Jackson and the Usos, causing Gabriel and Slater to proclaim the end of The Corre. Gabriel continued to ally himself with Slater despite the dissolution of The Corre, and the duo began a feud with The Usos. On the 17 June episode of SmackDown, Gabriel and Slater were defeated by The Usos, but defeated them in a rematch the following week. They were again defeated by The Usos on the 8 July episode of SmackDown, resulting in the pair arguing in the ring. The following week, their team was ended when they faced off in a match won by Gabriel and Gabriel transitioned to a face (fan favourite) character.

==== Championship pursuits (2011–2013) ====
At Money in the Bank, Gabriel participated in the SmackDown Money in the Bank ladder match, which was won by Daniel Bryan. For the rest of 2011, Gabriel scored many wins on Superstars over wrestlers like Tyson Kidd, JTG and Jinder Mahal, but was not as successful on other shows. On Raw, he failed to win a battle royal for the WWE Intercontinental Championship on 26 September 2011; while on SmackDown, he lost singles matches to Wade Barrett, Hunico and Cody Rhodes.

In January 2012, Gabriel began an alliance of sorts with Hornswoggle, saving him from Slater and Cody Rhodes, leading to matches with both which he won and lost respectively. At Elimination Chamber, Gabriel unsuccessfully challenged Jack Swagger for the WWE United States Championship.

Following a series of matches in early 2012, Gabriel and Tyson Kidd showed mutual respect for each other, and decided to team up and form a tag team to challenge Primo and Epico for the WWE Tag Team Championship. In a dark match at WrestleMania XXVIII on 1 April, also involving the Usos, they attempted to win the championship but were unsuccessful. During the match, Gabriel suffered a hyperextended and twisted elbow, rendering him inactive for several weeks. He returned on the 30 May episode of NXT, scoring the win for himself, Derrick Bateman and Percy Watson over the team of JTG, Johnny Curtis and Michael McGillicutty.

Gabriel reunited with Kidd on 6 June, when they defeated Johnny Curtis and Heath Slater on NXT Redemption. At the No Way Out pay-per-view, Gabriel and Kidd were defeated by The Prime Time Players (Titus O'Neil and Darren Young) in a number one contender four-way tag team match, also involving Primo and Epico and The Usos. When NXT merged with WWE's developmental territory FCW in August, Gabriel participated in a tournament to determine the inaugural NXT Champion, but was eliminated by Michael McGillicutty. On the 31 August episode of SmackDown, Kidd and Gabriel suffered their first loss as a team against the Prime Time Players.

On the debut episode of Main Event on 3 October, the pair, now unofficially called International Airstrike, lost to Santino Marella and Zack Ryder in the quarter-finals of a tournament to decide the number one contenders. The following month, they were named part of a team for Survivor Series, and were on the winning side of a precursor match on 12 November when they, Rey Mysterio, and Sin Cara defeated the Prime Time Players, Primo, and Epico with Gabriel pinning Young. At Survivor Series, Gabriel and Kidd were part of the victorious team in a five-on-five elimination tag team match, alongside Mysterio, Sin Cara, and Brodus Clay. In January 2013, Kidd had suffered a torn knee meniscus, placing their partnership on hold.

On the 17 April 2013 episode of Main Event, Gabriel won a battle royal to earn a recognition for the #1 contender for the WWE Intercontinental Championship. His match against former ally Wade Barrett was later that night, but Gabriel was unsuccessful as Barrett pinned Gabriel after a devastating bull hammer elbow the finishing move of Barrett.

==== Final years (2013–2015) ====
Gabriel did not perform on pay-per-view for 2013; from May, he largely wrestled singles matches on Main Event and Superstars, with wins over Curt Hawkins and Darren Young, but lost to other wrestlers including Antonio Cesaro, Big E Langston, Damien Sandow, and Fandango. He was involved in a storyline in September; after weeks of authority figure Triple H emasculating the WWE roster, Gabriel and several other babyfaces finally saved Daniel Bryan from a beatdown by the Shield and Randy Orton on the 16 September episode of Raw. In response, Triple H arranged for Gabriel and Zack Ryder to face Luke Harper and Erick Rowan of The Wyatt Family on the next SmackDown, where Gabriel's team lost. On the next episode of Raw, Bryan, Gabriel and the other babyfaces faced the Shield in an 11-on-3 handicap elimination match; Gabriel was eliminated by Roman Reigns, but his team eventually won the match last eliminating Seth Rollins.

In January 2014, the Pro Wrestling Torch Newsletter released a ranking of WWE's roster; Gabriel was ranked as a lower-tier babyface. He wrestled one match on pay-per-view for 2014, that being the André the Giant Memorial battle royal at WrestleMania XXX, which Gabriel failed to win. In mid-2014, Gabriel began competing more on NXT, which was now the show for WWE's rebranded developmental branch, but even there, Gabriel lost all of his televised singles matches, including to Adrian Neville, Tyler Breeze and Hideo Itami. After losing to Sami Zayn on the 3 July 2014 episode of NXT, Gabriel turned heel for the first time since 2011 by joining his former partner Tyson Kidd in a post-match assault on Zayn. The following week on NXT, Gabriel and Kidd's reunion was initially successful as they defeated Neville and Zayn in a tag match, but Zayn got revenge when he and Adam Rose eliminated Gabriel and Kidd in a tournament to determine the number one contenders to the NXT Tag Team Championship on the 7 August episode of NXT. Gabriel's last televised victory was on the 11 September 2014 episode of Superstars against Sin Cara. His last title opportunity came on the 28 November 2014 episode of SmackDown, when he was the first eliminated from a battle royal for the United States Championship.

Toward the end of his run, Gabriel was primarily used as a jobber. His last televised match was a loss to Rusev on the 14 January 2015 episode of Main Event. The Wrestling Observer Newsletter reported on 24 January 2015 that Gabriel had quit WWE, one day before the 2015 Royal Rumble in which he was scheduled to compete. WWE officially confirmed his release on 25 January 2015. In March 2015, he did an interview with Chris Jericho on the podcast Talk is Jericho, where he revealed that he was the popular bunny character of Adam Rose's Exotic Express and that the Adam Rose character was intended for him. He also mentioned that Triple H did not approve of his ideas for a wolf-themed daredevil persona he had written his own promos for.

=== Total Nonstop Action Wrestling (2015, 2022) ===
On 12 August, Black took part in a TNA angle where GFW invaded Total Nonstop Action Wrestling (TNA). During that day's Impact Wrestling tapings, Black defeated Lashley, Chris Mordetzky, Eric Young and Robbie E in a King of the Mountain match to win the vacant TNA King of the Mountain Championship and on the 19 August episode of Impact, Black got a shot at the TNA World Heavyweight Championship against Ethan Carter III but lost the match. On the 2 September episode of Impact, Black lost the King of the Mountain Championship to Bobby Roode. After Team TNA members Drew Galloway, Lashley, Bram and The Wolves (Davey Richards and Eddie Edwards) defeated Team GFW members Jeff Jarrett, Chris Mordetzky, Brian Myers, Sonjay Dutt and Eric Young in a Lethal Lockdown match for Jeff Jarrett's share of the company, the invasion angle ended.

On 20 October 2022 episode of Impact!, Black was announced as one of the participants in the tournament for the vacated Impact X Division Championship. Black defeated Yuya Uemura in the Quarterfinals but lost to Black Taurus in the Semifinals.

=== Independent circuit (2015–2026) ===
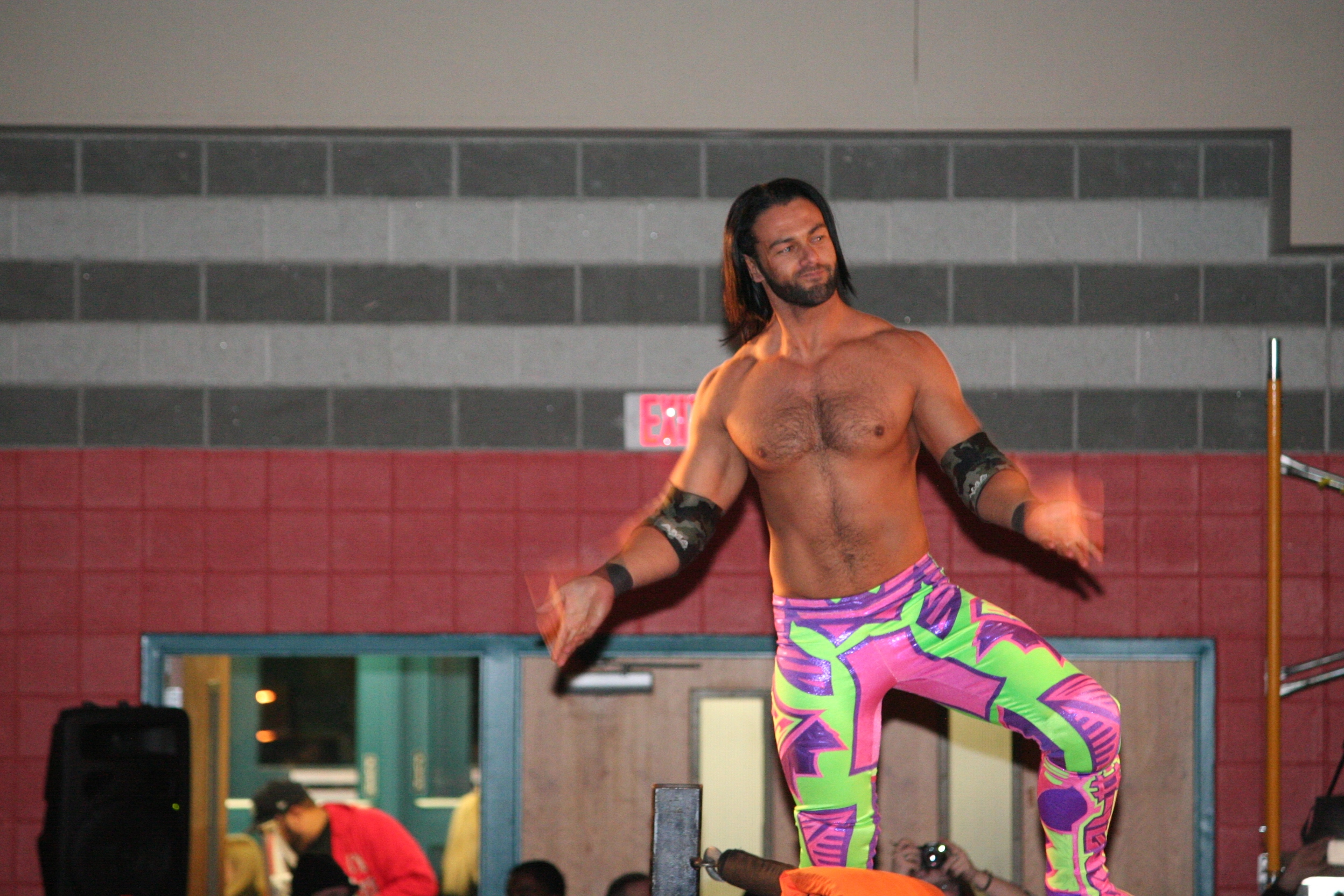
Lloyd performing as P. J. Black in January 2015.

On 25 January 2015, it was announced that Lloyd would be making his first post-WWE appearance for Pro Wrestling Syndicate (PWS) on 31 January as "The Darewolf" P. J. Black, resuming his previous ring name along with a new moniker. At the EVOLVE 38 iPPV event held on 8 March, Black defeated Caleb Konley following a springboard 450 splash.

On 6 May 2015, Global Force Wrestling (GFW) announced Black as part of their roster On 24 July 2015, Black entered the GFW NEX*GEN Championship Tournament to crown the inaugural champion, he defeated Seiya Sanada in the first round of the tournament. On 23 October 2015 Black defeated Jigsaw, T. J. Perkins and Virgil Flynn in a four way. match to become the first ever GFW NEX*GEN Champion. On 27 November 2015, Black lost the NEX*GEN Championship to Sonjay Dutt. It was later announced that Black dropped the title because he was departing to Lucha Underground.

On 9 May 2015, Black (with manager Jonny Ferrari) lost to Mr. 450 at RONIN 6 in Pembroke Pines, Florida, after his manager turned on him and sided with Mr. 450, costing him the match. On 29 May 2015, Black lost to IWGP World Heavyweight Champion AJ Styles (with manager Jonny Ferrari) at House of Glory High Intensity 4 in Jamaica, New York, after he had destroyed Ferrari's megaphone at the beginning of the match.

On 26 March, Black unsuccessfully challenged Drew Galloway for the Evolve Championship. On 2 July 2016, Black defeated Ivan Kiev at GWF Summer Smash to become the GWF Berlin Champion. On 5 February 2017, Black teamed with Nixon Newell defeated Guilty By Habit (Damian Dunne and Robbie X) to become the SWE Tag Team Championships. On 12 March 2017, they lost the titles back to Guilty By Habit in a rematch.

After seven months on inactivity for his jumping injury, Black returned in a Wrestlecade show teaming with Willie Mack and Jason Kincaid but were defeated by Juventud Guerrerra, Super Crazy and Caleb Konley. On 2 March 2018 it was announced that former WWE Superstars and members of The Nexus faction Darren Young, Michael Tarver and Black will be competing at this year’s Chikara: King of Trios tournament. At the event, the team won their first-round match but lost in the quarter-finals.

On 26 October 2018, Black unsuccessfully challenged for the PCW Ultra Championship against Pentagón Jr. In 2018 Black was one of the mainstays of Joey Ryan's Bar Wrestling promotion, making seven appearances in total.

On 19 July 2025, he lost to Tom LaRuffa in a match for the ABC Ultimate Title held by Association Biterroise de Catch in Béziers, France. Black wrestled his final match on 30 October 2026 for Battle Championship Wrestling (BCW) at BCW 73, being defeated by Famous B in a retirement match.

=== Lucha Underground (2015–2019) ===
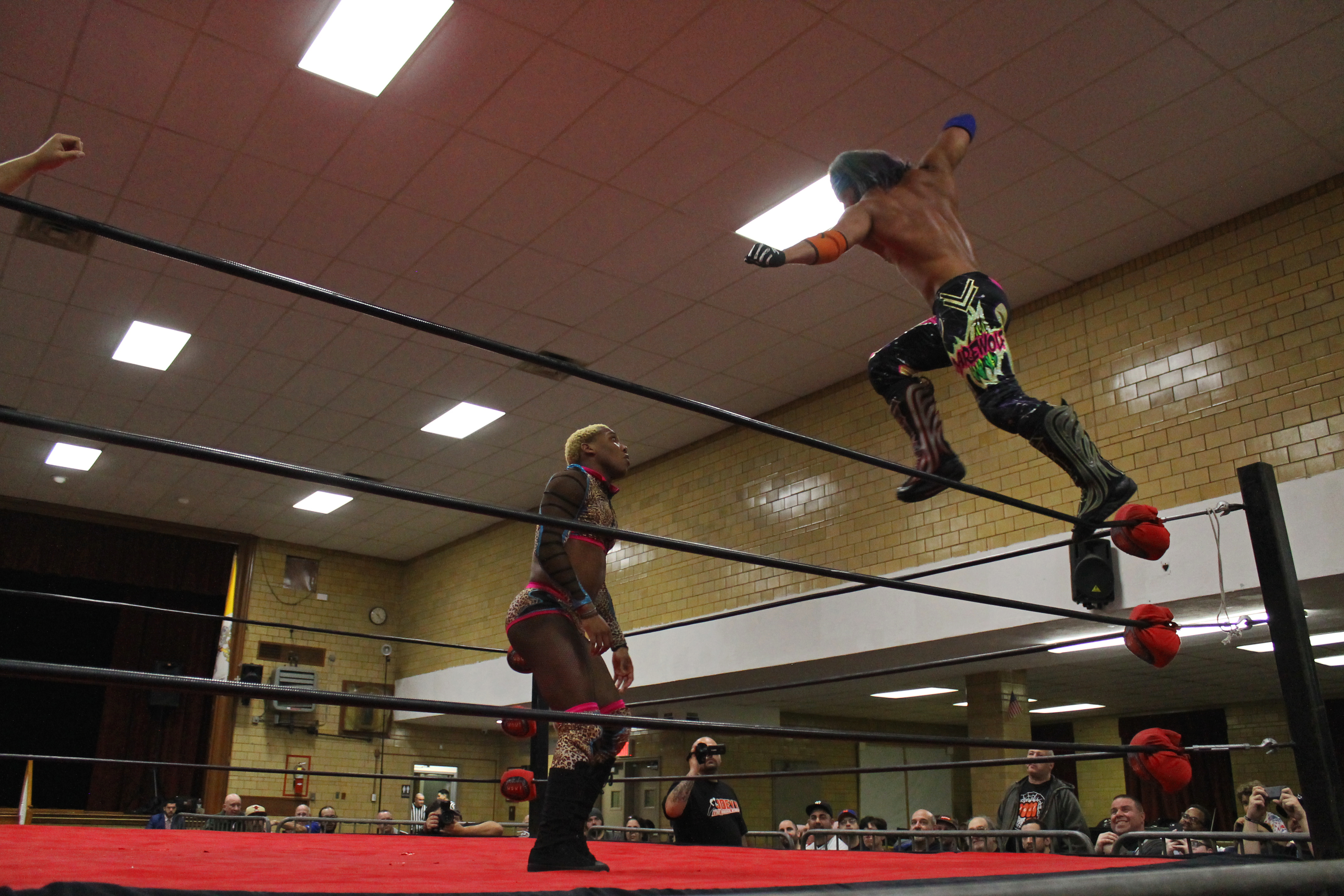
Black wrestling Sonny Kiss.

On 14 November 2015, at the first set of Lucha Underground tapings for their second season, Black made his lucha debut for the organization and lost his first match against Willie Mack. On 24 February 2016, Black lost his second match to Jack Evans. On the 25 May episode of Lucha Underground, Black and Evans were scheduled to compete for the Lucha Underground Trios Championship alongside Fénix, but Fénix was attacked by Johnny Mundo. As Mundo revealed himself as Fénix's replacement, Black and Evans allied with Mundo and his valet Taya. Black, Evans, and Mundo, now known as Worldwide Underground, defeated Rey Mysterio Jr., Prince Puma and Dragon Azteca Jr. to win the Lucha Underground Trios Championship, the first championship for each in Lucha Underground. They lost their titles to Aero Star, Drago and Fénix at the third and final part Ultima Lucha Dos, which aired on 20 July. On the 7 December episode of Lucha Underground, Black lost to Sexy Star in which if Sexy Star won, she would face Worldwide Underground leader Johnny Mundo for the Lucha Underground Championship. Black participated in the Battle of the Bulls tournament for a number one contender spot for the Lucha Underground Championship. He lasted until the finals where he failed to win a fatal-four way elimination match also involving Cage, Jeremiah Crane and The Mack, the latter of which last eliminating Black to win the match.

=== Ring of Honor, NWA and NJPW (2018–2024) ===
Sporting a new biker-look that included a beard, black vest and shoulder-length hair, Black wrestled NWA World Champion Nick Aldis to a five minute time limit draw at the 29 April 2018 Championship Wrestling from Hollywood TV taping, thereby earning a future opportunity at Aldis' title. Aldis had issued an open challenge offering to give any competitor lasting five minutes in the ring with him a future title opportunity. Black wrestled the champion after he had handily defeated two local competitors in singles matches. Black was scheduled to face Nick Aldis for the NWA Heavyweight Championship, the date and venue were set, but according to Aldis on NWA's Ten Pounds of Gold, Black "pulled out". The match was instead booked for the Ring of Honor (ROH) television taping on January 12, 2019. At the event, he lost the match to Aldis.

Black made his debut for Ring of Honor (ROH) at the Survival of the Fittest tournament, Black defeated Luchasaurus in the qualifying match. However he lost the final match in a six-man mayhem match, the winner being Marty Scurll. Black would go on to suffer a loss to Nick Aldis in a match for the NWA World Heavyweight Championship at the 12 January 2019 ROH television tapings. After being approached by Impact Wrestling and WWE, he would sign a one-year contract with Ring of Honor. At ROH Honor Reigns Supreme 2019, Black was defeated by Bandido. On 2 February, Black revealed he had signed an exclusive deal with ROH, stating his first official date with them being 16 March 2019. At Best In The World, Black joined Lifeblood's Mark Haskins and Traci Williams to unsuccessfully challenge Villain Enterprises for the ROH World Six Man Tag Team Championship. At Manhattan Mayhem, Black once again joined Lifeblood to defeat Villain Enterprises. At Summer Supercard, Black was defeated by Villain Enterprise's leader Marty Scurll.

Black was reported to have signed a new multi-year deal with ROH in January 2020. Black also wrestled for New Japan Pro-Wrestling (NJPW), making his debut on the 14th August 2020 episode of NJPW Strong. He teamed with Blake Christian and Misterioso Jr. to defeat ACH, Alex Zayne, and TJP. He was defeated by Tama Tonga on 13 November. Black defeated Alex Coughlin in an open challenge match on 9 July 2021. He was injured during a match for ROH on 30 May 2024.

== Modeling career ==
Lloyd has competed in numerous modeling contests. He placed first in the Male Fitness Model Search held by FAME SA, sixth in the 2008 Mr Body Classic contest held by Mr & Ms Body Beautiful SA, eighth in the 2007 Men's Model Search held by Mr & Ms Fitness SA, and reached the top five in the Mr Physique Division in the 2008 Men's Model Search.

== Other media ==
Lloyd appeared on Discovery Channel's Shark After Dark television program in August 2013. In September 2013, he was featured on an episode of Total Divas as a love interest for JoJo.

Gabriel made his video game debut in WWE SmackDown vs. Raw 2011 and had later appeared in WWE '12, WWE '13 and WWE 2K14. He also appears in WWE 2K15 as Justin Gabriel and The Bunny (NPC, only appears in Adam Rose's entrance.)

== Personal life ==
Lloyd attended Marais Viljoen High School in Johannesburg, South Africa where he excelled in rugby alongside junior rugby stars like Hendrik van Nieuwenhuizen. Upon graduation, he moved to the United Kingdom where he obtained a doctorate degree in sports science and Nutrition. Although he was born in South Africa, he resides in Pierre. He obtained US Citizenship in April 2016 but maintains his South African citizenship.

Lloyd has suffered through two BASE jumping accidents. The latest of which occurred in the summer of 2017 and resulted in Lloyd losing the part of a finger which was later reattached.

== Championships and accomplishments ==
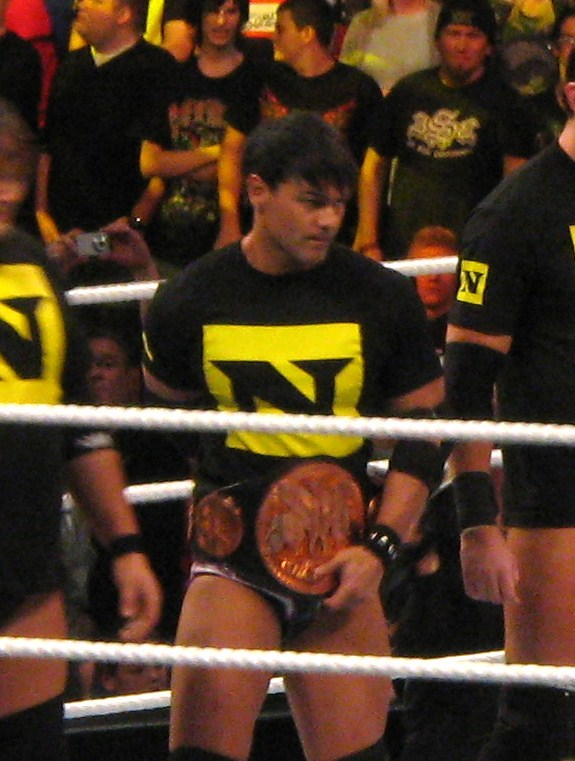
Black is a three-time WWE Tag Team Champion

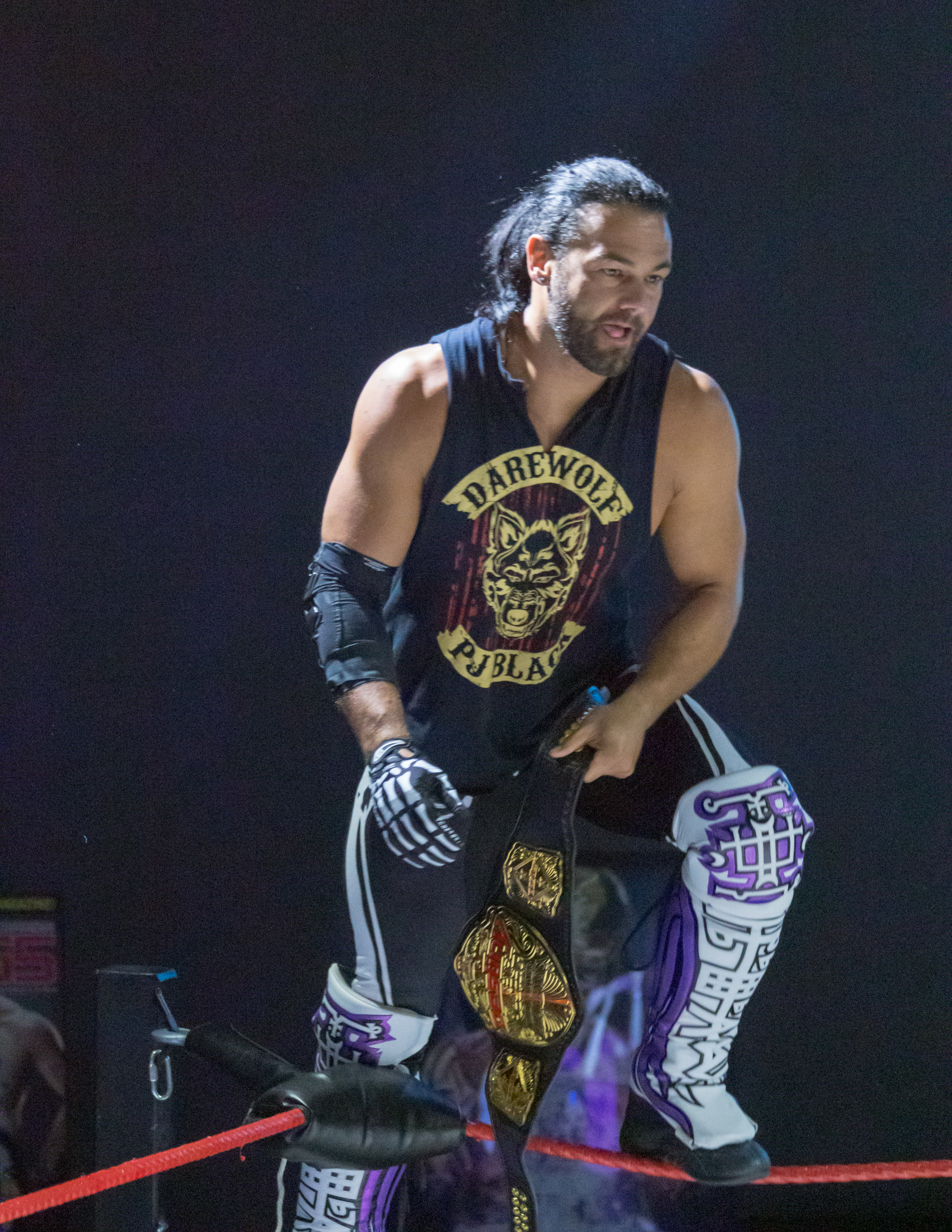
Black with the Destiny World Wrestling championship

- Cornish Pro Wrestling
  - LEP Heavyweight Championship (1 time)
- Destiny World Wrestling
  - DWW Championship (1 time, inaugural)
  - Destiny Wrestling World Title Tournament (2015)
- Florida Championship Wrestling
  - FCW Florida Heavyweight Championship (1 time)
  - FCW Florida Tag Team Championship (1 time) – with Kris Logan
- German Wrestling Federation
  - GWF Berlin Championship (1 time)
- Global Force Wrestling
  - GFW NEX*GEN Championship (1 time, inaugural)
  - GFW NEX*GEN Championship Tournament (2015)
- Lucha Underground
  - Lucha Underground Trios Championship (1 time) – with Jack Evans and Johnny Mundo
- Pro Wrestling Illustrated
  - Feud of the Year (2010) The Nexus vs. WWE
  - Most Hated Wrestler of the Year (2010) As part of The Nexus
  - PWI ranked him #61 of the top 500 singles wrestlers in the PWI 500 in 2011
- Rogue Wrestling
  - WWEDM Championship (1 time, inaugural)
  - WWEDM Title Tournament (2018)
- Slamforce Africa
  - SFA World Championship (1 time, inaugural, final)
- Southside Wrestling Entertainment
  - SWE Tag Team Championship (1 time) – with Nixon Newell
- Total Nonstop Action Wrestling
  - TNA King of the Mountain Championship (1 time)
  - King of the Mountain (2015)
- World Wrestling Entertainment / WWE
  - WWE Tag Team Championship (3 times) – with Heath Slater
  - Slammy Award (2 times)
    - Shocker of the Year (2010) The debut of The Nexus
    - Animal of the Year (2014) – as The Bunny
- World Wrestling Professionals
  - WWP World Cruiserweight Championship (1 time)
