= Tornado (wrestler) =

South African professional wrestler

- A bloody Tornado during one of his battles

Personal information
- Born: Steve Debbes; April 3, 1966 (age 60) Johannesburg, South Africa

Professional wrestling career
- Ring name(s): Tornado; Tornado II; Scorpio; Dynamite Kid; Amigo Kid
- Billed height: 5 ft 10 in (1.78 m)
- Billed weight: 242 lb (110 kg)
- Billed from: Johannesburg, South Africa
- Trained by: Don Charles; Wild Bill Murphy
- Debut: 1985

Steve Debbes (born April 3, 1966), better known by his ring name Tornado, is a South African professional wrestler performing for World Wrestling Professionals. He is a 2-time WWP Heavyweight World Champion and the longest-reigning title holder in the championship's history.

== Career ==
=== Early life ===
Steve Debbes was a former amateur wrestler and Judoka, starting his athletic career at the age of 5. He was a member at the Reitz klub in Gezina, Pretoria. He was trained by Don Charles and Wild Bill Murphy and at the age of 18 he turned professional, debuting under his real name in 1985.

=== All Stars Wrestling (1990–1999) ===
In the early 1990s, wrestling for All Stars Wrestling, he donned the Tornado II gimmick after Danie Brits, the original Tornado, passed it onto him. In his early career he traveled extensively overseas in order to gain experience. Some of the countries he toured included United Arab Emirates, Lebanon, Qatar, Saudi Arabia, Mexico, the United States, Japan and Russia. In 1994, he unmasked for the first time during a match against Steve Austin that took place at the Sun City Superbowl. In 1998, he took part in South Africa's first-ever barbed-wire match against Jacques Roque.

=== International Wrestling Federation (1999–2004) ===
In 1999, shortly after the death of close friend Paul Lloyd, Sr., who was the promoter of All Stars Wrestling, Tornado unmasked himself permanently in honour of his passing and took over the operations of the promotion. At the time International Wrestling Federation: South Africa served as a feeder system to All Stars Wrestling, producing young talent such as Paul Lloyd Sr.'s son and former WWE wrestler Justin Gabriel. Tornado decided to combine All Stars Wrestling with IWF:SA under the IWF banner.

He became the IWF Heavyweight Champion in 2000 and went on to win the IWF-sanctioned All Africa Championship five times.

=== World Wrestling Professionals (2004–Present) ===
In 2004, IWF closed down due to a new Port Elizabeth-based promotion, World Wrestling Professionals, securing a major national television deal with SABC2 and hiring wrestlers from all over the country, including Tornado who had close ties to the promoter of WWP, Mark Beale. Around this period Tornado was still operating the IWF training camp and he tutored many of this generation's top professional wrestlers in South Africa. Tornado captured the WWP World Heavyweight Title in 2005 on the first episode of WWP Thunderstrike. He defeated the Van Der Westhuizen brothers in a handicap match a few weeks later to win the WWP World Tag Team Titles before losing it again to the same tag team.

In 2008, he headlined WWP's Carnival City show in a Steel Cage match against Vincent Skull, a show that drew a record paid crowd for a South African wrestling show. He lost the WWP World Heavyweight Championship after a multi-year reign to newcomer Dameon Duke, who is now signed to WWE. He won the WWP World Tag Team Championship for the second time in February 2009, subsequently losing it to The French Connection in September of that same year. On July 11, 2009, in front of another record crowd of 20,000 people in the Democratic Republic of Congo, Tornado defeated Dameon Duke to win the vacant WWP World Heavyweight Title, becoming a 2-time champion. Tornado had a dominant run on 100% De Dana Dan, a television show airing nationally in India on Colours TV.

== Personal life ==
Tornado's son are also involved in wrestling and also the owner of holiday resort with his wife.

== Championships and accomplishments ==
Tornado executing the Tornadosault

- International Wrestling Federation: South Africa
  - IWF Heavyweight Championship (2 times)
- World Wrestling Professionals
  - WWP All-Africa Heavyweight Championship (5 times)
  - WWP World Heavyweight Championship (2 times)
  - WWP World Tag Team Championship (2 times)
  - WWP 100% Championship (1 time)
- Pro Wrestling Illustrated
  - PWI ranked him #448 of the 500 best singles wrestlers in 1993.
