= List of science fiction action films =

This is a list of science fiction action films.

== 0-9 ==
- 2012 (2009)
- 2.0 (2018)
- 3 Dev Adam (1973)
- 40 Days and Nights (2012)
- The 6th Day (2000)
- 9 (2009)
- The 10th Victim (1965)
- 1990: The Bronx Warriors (1982)
- 2009: Lost Memories (2002)
- 2019, After the Fall of New York (1983)
- 2020 Texas Gladiators (1985, VHS)

== A ==
- Abraxas, Guardian of the Universe (1991)
- Acción mutante (1993)
- The Adjustment Bureau (2011)
- Adrenalin: Fear the Rush (1996)
- The Adventures of Buckaroo Banzai Across the 8th Dimension (1984)
- The Adventures of Pluto Nash (2002)
- AE: Apocalypse Earth (2013)
- Æon Flux (2005)
- Alien Agent (2007)
- Alien Hunter (2003)
- Alien Nation (1988)
- Alien vs Ninja (2010)
- Alien vs. Predator (2004)
- Alienator (1990)
- Aliens (1986)
- Aliens vs. Predator: Requiem (2007)
- Alive (2002)
- All Superheroes Must Die (2011)
- The Amazing Spider-Man (2012)
- The Amazing Spider-Man 2 (2014)
- American Cyborg: Steel Warrior (1993)
- American Warships (2012)
- Android (1982)
- Android Cop (2014)
- Andromedia (1998)
- Andy Colby's Incredible Adventure (1988)
- The Angry Red Planet (1959)
- Ant-Man (2015)
- Ant-Man and the Wasp (2018)
- Ant-Man and the Wasp: Quantumania (2023)
- Appleseed (2004)
- Appleseed Alpha (2014)
- Appleseed Ex Machina (2007)
- Arachnicide (2014)
- Armageddon (1997, Hong Kong)
- Armageddon (1998, United States)
- Armor Hero Atlas (2014)
- Atlantic Rim (2013)
- Atragon (1963)
- Attack the Block (2011)
- Avatar (2004, Singapore)
- Avatar (2009, United States)
- Avatar: The Way of Water (2022)
- The Avengers (2012)
- Avengers Confidential: Black Widow & Punisher (2014)
- Avengers: Age of Ultron (2015)
- Avengers: Endgame (2019)
- Avengers: Infinity War (2018)

== B ==
- Barb Wire (1996)
- Batman: Under the Red Hood (2010)
- Battle Beyond the Stars (1980)
- Battle for the Planet of the Apes (1973)
- Battle in Outer Space (1959)
- Battle: Los Angeles (2011)
- Battle of the Damned (2013)
- Battle of Los Angeles (2011)
- Battlefield Earth (2000)
- Battleship (2012)
- Be Forever Yamato (1980)
- Beastmaster III: The Eye of Braxus (1996)
- Ben 10: Destroy All Aliens (2012)
- Ben 10: Race Against Time (2007)
- Ben 10: Secret of the Omnitrix (2007)
- Beneath the Planet of the Apes (1970)
- Beowulf (1999)
- Beyond Skyline (2007)
- The Black Hole (1979)
- Black Lightning (2009)
- Black Mask (1996)
- Black Mask 2: City of Masks (2002)
- Black Panther (2018)
- Black Panther: Wakanda Forever (2022)
- Blade (1998)
- Blade II (2002)
- Buck Rogers (1939 serial)
- Buck Rogers in the 25th Century (1979)
- Bumblebee (2018)
- Burst City (1982)

== C ==
- Captain America (1979)
- Captain America (1990)
- Captain America II: Death Too Soon
- Captain America: Civil War
- Captain America: The First Avenger
- Captain America: The Winter Soldier
- Captain Marvel
- Casshern
- The Cat
- The Cave
- Chappie
- Cherry 2000
- The Chronicles of Riddick
- The Chronicles of Riddick: Dark Fury
- Çilgin kiz ve üç süper adam
- Circuitry Man
- City Under Siege
- Cloverfield
- Congo
- Conquest of the Planet of the Apes
- The Core
- Cowboy Bebop: The Movie
- Crash and Burn
- Crash of Moons
- The Crazies
- Crime Zone
- Crossworlds
- CyberTracker
- Cyborg
- Cyborg 2
- Cyborg 3: The Recycler
- Cyborg Cop
- Cyborg Cop II
- Cyborg Soldier
- Cyclone

== D ==
- D.A.R.Y.L.
- D4
- Daigoro vs. Goliath
- Daikaijū Tōkyō ni arawaru
- Daikyojū Gappa
- Daimajin
- The Darkest Hour
- Darkman
- Darkman II: The Return of Durant
- Darkman III: Die Darkman Die
- Dawn of the Planet of the Apes
- Dead and Deader
- Dead End Drive-In
- Dead Heat
- Dead Leaves
- Dead or Alive: Final
- Dead Space
- Dear God No!
- Death Machine
- The Death of the Incredible Hulk
- Death Race 2000
- Deathline
- Deathsport
- Deep Sea Monster Reigo
- DeepStar Six
- Déjà Vu
- Demolition Man
- The Demolitionist
- Denizen
- Destroy All Monsters
- Displaced
- District 9
- DNA
- DOA: Dead or Alive
- Dogora
- Dollman
- Dollman vs. Demonic Toys
- Doom
- Doomsday
- Downstream
- Dragonball Evolution
- Dredd
- Dune
- Dünyayı Kurtaran Adam

== E ==
- Eagle Eye
- Eliminators
- Elysium
- The Empire Strikes Back
- Ender's Game
- Enemy Mine
- Equilibrium
- Escape from L.A.
- Escape from Mars
- Escape from New York
- Escape from the Planet of the Apes
- Expect No Mercy
- Electric Dragon 80.000 V
- Encounter
- The End of Evangelion
- Endgame
- Enthiran
- Escaflowne
- Escape from the Bronx
- Eve of Destruction
- Exterminators of the Year 3000

== F ==
- The Fantastic Four (1994)
- The Fanimatrix
- Fantastic Four (2005)
- Fantastic Four: Rise of the Silver Surfer
- Fantastic Voyage
- Far Cry
- Farewell to Space Battleship Yamato
- The Fifth Element
- Final Fantasy VII: Advent Children
- Final Fantasy: The Spirits Within
- Final Yamato
- Firebreather
- Firehead
- Fist of the North Star
- Flash Gordon (1980)
- Flash Gordon (serial film)
- Flash Gordon Conquers the Universe
- Flash Gordon: The Greatest Adventure of All
- Flash Gordon's Trip to Mars
- Forbidden Planet
- Fortress
- Fortress 2: Re-Entry
- Frankenstein Conquers the World
- Frankenstein's Army
- Futurama: Bender's Big Score
- Futurama: The Beast with a Billion Backs
- Futurama: Bender's Game
- Futurama: Into the Wild Green Yonder
- Freejack
- Full Metal Yakuza
- Future Cops
- Future Force
- Future War
- Future X-Cops
- Futureworld

== G ==
- G.I. Joe: Retaliation
- G.I. Joe: The Rise of Cobra
- Gamer
- Gamera
- Gamera 2: Attack of Legion
- Gamera the Brave
- Gamera: Guardian of the Universe
- Gamera: Super Monster
- Gamera vs. Barugon
- Gamera vs. Guiron
- Gamera vs. Gyaos
- Gamera vs. Jiger
- Gamera vs. Viras
- Gamera vs. Zigra
- Gabby's Dollhouse: The Movie
- Gen^{13}
- The Gene Generation
- Generation X
- Ghidorah, the Three-Headed Monster
- Ghost in the Machine
- Ghost in the Shell
- Ghosts of Mars
- Godzilla (1954)
- Godzilla (1977)
- Godzilla (2014)
- Godzilla 1985
- Godzilla 2000
- Godzilla Against Mechagodzilla
- Godzilla: Final Wars
- Godzilla, King of the Monsters!
- Godzilla, Mothra and King Ghidorah: Giant Monsters All-Out Attack
- Godzilla Raids Again
- Godzilla: Tokyo S.O.S.
- Godzilla vs. Biollante
- Godzilla vs. Destoroyah
- Godzilla vs. Gigan
- Godzilla vs. Hedorah
- Godzilla vs. King Ghidorah
- Godzilla vs. Kong
- Godzilla vs. Mechagodzilla
- Godzilla vs. Mechagodzilla II
- Godzilla vs. Megaguirus
- Godzilla vs. Megalon
- Godzilla vs. Mothra
- Godzilla vs. SpaceGodzilla
- Godzilla vs. the Sea Monster
- Gorath
- Gravity
- The Green Goblin's Last Stand
- Green Lantern
- Green Lantern: First Flight
- Guardians of the Galaxy
- Guardians of the Galaxy Vol. 2
- Guardians of the Galaxy Vol. 3
- Gunhed
- The Guyver
- Guyver: Dark Hero

== H ==
- Hard to Be a God
- Hardwired
- Health Warning
- Heavy Metal
- Heavy Metal 2000
- The Hidden
- Hirokin
- Hulk
- Hulk Vs

== I ==
- I Am Number Four
- I Come in Peace (Dark Angel)
- I, Frankenstein
- I, Robot
- Ignition
- Impostor
- In Time
- The Incredible Hulk
- The Incredible Hulk Returns
- Independence Day
- Independence Day: Resurgence
- Interceptor Force 2
- Invasion of Astro-Monster
- The Invincible Iron Man
- The Iron Giant
- Iron Man
- Iron Man 2
- Iron Man 3
- Iron Man: Rise of Technovore
- The Island

== J ==
Jurassic World Rebirth

- JLA Adventures: Trapped in Time
- John Carter
- Johnny Mnemonic
- Judge Dredd
- Judgment Day
- Jurassic Park
- Jurassic Park III
- Jurassic World
- Jurassic World: Dominion
- Jurassic World: Fallen Kingdom
- Justice League: Crisis on Two Earths
- Justice League: Doom
- Justice League: The Flashpoint Paradox
- Justice League: The New Frontier
- Justice League of America
- Justice League: War
- Johnny Mnemonic

== K ==
- Kamen Rider Den-O: I'm Born!
- Karate Cop
- King Kong Appears in Edo
- King Kong Escapes
- King Kong vs. Godzilla
- The King of Fighters
- Knights
- Kong: Skull Island
- Krull
- Kung Fury

== L ==
- Land of Doom
- Last Order: Final Fantasy VII
- The Last Starfighter
- The Lawnmower Man
- Left Behind
- Lego Batman: The Movie – DC Super Heroes Unite
- Lego Star Wars: Bombad Bounty
- Lego Star Wars: The Quest for R2-D2
- Leviathan
- Lockout
- Logan's Run
- Lost in Space
- The Lost World: Jurassic Park

== M ==
- M.D. Geist
- Mad Max
- Mad Max 2
- Mad Max: Beyond Thunderdome
- Mad Max: Fury Road
- The Magic Serpent
- Man of Steel
- Manborg
- Manhunt in Space
- Manticore
- The Matrix
- The Matrix Reloaded
- The Matrix Revolutions
- Max Knight: Ultra Spy
- Max Steel
- Meatball Machine
- Megafault
- Megaforce
- Mega Shark vs. Crocosaurus
- Mega Shark vs. Mecha Shark
- Memories
- Memory Run
- Men in Black
- Men in Black II
- Men in Black 3
- Morons from Outer Space
- Message from Space
- Metal Gear Solid: Philanthropy
- Meteor
- Meteor Apocalypse
- The Meteor Man
- Metropolis
- Mighty Morphin Power Rangers: The Movie
- Das Millionenspiel
- Minority Report
- Mirai Ninja
- Mission to Mars
- The Monster X Strikes Back/Attack the G8 Summit
- Moon 44
- Moon Child
- Moonraker
- Mortal Kombat
- Mortal Kombat Annihilation
- Mothra
- Mothra vs. Godzilla
- Mutant
- Mutant Chronicles
- Mutant Girls Squad
- The Mysterians

== N ==
- Natural City
- Nazis at the Center of the Earth
- Negadon: The Monster from Mars
- Nekrotronic
- Nemesis
- Nemesis 2: Nebula
- Nemesis 3: Prey Harder
- Nemesis 4: Death Angel
- Next Avengers: Heroes of Tomorrow
- The New Barbarians
- Night Is Day
- Night of the Comet
- No Escape

== O ==
- Oblivion
- Ōgon Bat
- Omega Doom
- The Omega Man
- On Line
- The One
- Outland
- Outlander
- Overlord

== P ==
- Pacific Rim
- Pacific Rim: Uprising
- Paycheck
- The Philadelphia Experiment
- Philadelphia Experiment II
- Pitch Black
- Planet Hulk
- Planet of the Apes (1968)
- Planet of the Apes (2001)
- Plughead Rewired: Circuitry Man II
- Popeye Meets the Man Who Hated Laughter
- Post Impact
- The Postman
- Prayer of the Rollerboys
- Predator
- Predator 2
- Predators
- Priest
- Prisoners of the Lost Universe
- Project Shadowchaser
- Project Shadowchaser II
- Project Shadowchaser III
- Project Shadowchaser IV
- Prometheus
- Prototype
- Pterodactyl
- The Purifiers
- Push

== Q ==
- The Quick and the Undead

== R ==
- R.O.T.O.R.
- Ra.One
- Race
- Raptor Island
- Ravagers
- Real Steel
- Rebirth of Mothra
- Rebirth of Mothra II
- Rebirth of Mothra III
- Replicant
- Repo Men
- Resident Evil
- Resident Evil: Afterlife
- Resident Evil: Apocalypse
- Resident Evil: Extinction
- Resident Evil: The Final Chapter
- Resident Evil: Retribution
- Resident Evil: Welcome to Raccoon City
- Resurrection of the Little Match Girl
- Retroactive
- The Return of Godzilla
- Return of the Jedi
- The Return of Swamp Thing
- Return to Frogtown
- Returner
- Revenge Quest
- Reversion
- Riddick
- Rise of the Planet of the Apes
- RoboCop (1987)
- RoboCop (2014)
- RoboCop 2
- RoboCop 3
- RoboGeisha
- Robot Jox
- Robot Wars
- Rock Monster
- The Rocketeer
- Rodan
- Rogue One
- Rollerball (1975)
- Rollerball (2002)
- Runaway
- The Running Man

== S ==
- S.S. Doomtrooper
- Saga of a Star World
- Samurai Princess
- Samurai Sentai Shinkenger vs. Go-onger: GinmakuBang!!
- The Scam Artist
- Scanners
- Scanners II: The New Order
- Scanners III: The Takeover
- Sci-Fighters
- Science Ninja Team Gatchaman: The Movie
- Scorcher
- Screamers
- Serenity
- Shocking Dark
- Silent Rage
- Six: The Mark Unleashed
- Skyline
- Skylines
- Slipstream
- Snake Eyes
- So Close
- Soldier
- Solo
- Solo: A Star Wars Story
- Son of Batman
- Son of Godzilla
- Source Code
- Space Amoeba
- Space Battleship Yamato (1977)
- Space Battleship Yamato (2010)
- Space Battleship Yamato: Resurrection
- Space Marines
- Space Mutiny
- Space Raiders
- Special
- Specter
- Spider-Man (1977)
- Spider-Man (2002)
- Spider-Man 2
- Spider-Man 3
- Split Second
- Star Trek
- Star Trek II: The Wrath of Khan
- Star Trek III: The Search for Spock
- Star Trek V: The Final Frontier
- Star Trek VI: The Undiscovered Country
- Star Trek Beyond
- Star Trek Into Darkness
- Star Wars
- Star Wars: The Clone Wars
- Star Wars: Episode I – The Phantom Menace
- Star Wars: Episode II – Attack of the Clones
- Star Wars: Episode III – Revenge of the Sith
- Star Wars: The Force Awakens
- Star Wars: The Last Jedi
- Star Wars: The Rise of Skywalker
- The Star Wars Holiday Special
- Starcrash
- Stargate
- Stargate: The Ark of Truth
- Stargate: Continuum
- Starship Troopers
- Starship Troopers 2: Hero of the Federation
- Starship Troopers 3: Marauder
- Steel and Lace
- Steel Dawn
- Steel Frontier
- Strange Invaders
- StrayDog: Kerberos Panzer Cops
- Street Fighter
- Super 8
- The Super Inframan
- Super Shark
- Superman: Doomsday
- Superman/Batman: Public Enemies
- Supersonic Man
- Surrogates

== T ==
- Tamala 2010: A Punk Cat in Space
- Tank Girl
- TC 2000
- Teenage Mutant Ninja Turtles (1990)
- Teenage Mutant Ninja Turtles (2014)
- Teenage Mutant Ninja Turtles II: The Secret of the Ooze
- Teenage Mutant Ninja Turtles III
- Teenage Mutant Ninja Turtles: Out of the Shadows
- Tekken
- The Terminator
- Terminator 2: Judgment Day
- Terminator 3: Rise of the Machines
- Terminator: Dark Fate
- Terminator Genisys
- Terminator Salvation
- Terminus
- Terror of Mechagodzilla
- Tetsuo II: Body Hammer
- Tetsuo: The Bullet Man
- They Live
- Thunderbirds
- THX 1138
- The Time Machine
- Timecop
- Timecop 2: The Berlin Decision
- Timeline
- Timequest
- Timerider: The Adventure of Lyle Swann
- Titan A.E.
- TMNT
- Tokyo Gore Police
- The Tomorrow War
- Total Recall (1990)
- Total Recall (2012)
- The Toxic Avenger
- Train to Busan
- Trancers
- Trancers II
- Trancers III
- Transformers
- Transformers: Age of Extinction
- Transformers: Dark of the Moon
- Transformers: The Last Knight
- The Transformers: The Movie
- Transformers: Revenge of the Fallen
- Transformers: Rise of the Beasts
- The Trial of the Incredible Hulk
- Tron
- Tron: Legacy
- Trucks
- Turbo Kid
- Turbo: A Power Rangers Movie
- Turkey Shoot
- Twins Mission

== U ==
- Ultimate Avengers
- Ultimate Avengers 2
- The Ultimate Warrior
- Ultra Warrior
- Ultraviolet
- Universal Soldier
- Universal Soldier II: Brothers in Arms
- Universal Soldier III: Unfinished Business
- Universal Soldier: Day of Reckoning
- Universal Soldier: Regeneration
- Universal Soldier: The Return

== V ==
- V for Vendetta
- Vampirella
- Varan the Unbelievable
- Vendetta dal futuro
- Vexille
- Vice
- Virtuosity
- The Void

== W ==
- The War of the Gargantuas
- War of the Robots
- War of the Worlds
- Warlords of the 21st Century
- Warriors of the Year 2072
- Wasei Kingu Kongu
- Waterworld
- Wedlock
- Werewolves of the Third Reich
- The Wesley's Mysterious File
- Westworld
- What Waits Below
- Wing Commander
- The Wolverine
- Wonderful Days
- The Wraith
- Wyrmwood

== X ==
- The X-Files
- The X-Files: I Want to Believe
- The X from Outer Space
- X-Men:
  - Deadpool
  - Deadpool 2
  - Logan
  - The Wolverine
  - X-Men
  - X-Men: Apocalypse
  - X-Men: Dark Phoenix
  - X-Men: Days of Future Past
  - X-Men: First Class
  - X-Men: The Last Stand
  - X-Men Origins: Wolverine
  - X2

== Y ==
- Yakuza Weapon
- Yamata no Orochi no Gyakushū
- Yamato: The New Voyage
- Yo-Yo Girl Cop
- Young Ones

== Z ==
- Zeiram
- Zombie Wars
- Zone of the Dead

== See also ==
- Lists of horror films
- Lists of science fiction films
- List of science fiction comedy films
- List of science fiction horror films
