= Cyborg Cop III =

- Official DVD cover
- Directed by: Yossi Wein
- Written by: Dennis Dimster (Story); Jeff Albert & Dennis Dimster (Screenplay)
- Produced by: Danny Lerner; David Varod
- Starring: Frank Zagarino; Bryan Genesse; Jenny McShane; Ian Roberts; Justin Illusion
- Cinematography: Rod Stewart
- Edited by: Mac Errington
- Music by: Sam Sklair
- Production company: Nu Image/Millennium Films
- Distributed by: Image Entertainment; New Line Home Video
- Release dates: 1995 (Greece); April 16, 1996 (USA)
- Running time: 94 minutes
- Country: United States
- Language: English

Cyborg Cop III is a 1995 American direct-to-video science-fiction action film, starring Frank Zagarino and Bryan Genesse. Written by Jeff Albert & Dennis Dimster and directed by Yossi Wein, it is the third installment in the Cyborg Cop film series. This film is a standalone sequel to Cyborg Cop (1993) and Cyborg Cop II (1994).

== Plot ==
A scientist intends to turn students into mercenary cyborgs, but a police officer is determined to stop his experiments.

== Cast ==
- Frank Zagarino as Saint Sebastian
- Bryan Genesse as Max Colley
- Jenny McShane as Eveylyn Reed
- Ian Roberts as Sheen
- Justin Illusion as Adam
- Ian Yule as Harvey Cartel
- Michael Brunner as Dr. Phelps
- Hal Orandini as Cooper
- Jurgen Hellberg as Derrick
- Tony Caprari as Seth
- Martin Le Maitre as Lennie
- Tyrone Stevenson as Oscar
- Arthur Berezin as Cyborg #1
- Wade Eastwood as Cyborg #2
- Vadim Dobrin as Cyborg #3

== Reception ==
Richard Scheib from Moria.co gave the film only one star and wrote: "Cyborg Cop III must be the single worst film that Nu World ever put out. It is hard to know where to begin." Mitch Lovell from The Video Vacuum gave Cyborg Cop III only one and a half stars: "Cyborg Cop III is pretty inept in just about every regard. But despite the fact that the cyborg is not a cop (he’s a Phys. Ed. student!!!), there is at least one police station massacre scene that blatantly rips off The Terminator."
