= Project Shadowchaser II =

- Directed by: John Eyres
- Written by: Nick Davis
- Produced by: Jeff Albert (associate producer); Shari Lane Bowles (associate producer); Danny Dimbort (executive producer); John Eyres (producer); Geoff Griffith (producer); Avi Lerner (executive producer); Danny Lerner (co-producer); Trevor Short (executive producer); Gregory Vanger (producer)
- Starring: Frank Zagarino; Bryan Genesse; Beth Toussaint; Daniel Bonjour
- Cinematography: Alan M. Trow
- Edited by: Amanda I. Kirpaul
- Music by: Stephen Edwards
- Distributed by: Nu Image
- Release date: May 1994
- Running time: 94 minutes
- Country: United States
- Language: English

Project Shadowchaser II, also known as Shadowchaser II, Night Scenes: Project Shadowchaser II, Night Siege and Armed And Deadly, is a 1994 American direct-to-video science fiction film by director John Eyres. It is the second installment in the Project Shadowchaser film series.

== Premise ==
A berserk android threatens mankind with nuclear annihilation, and three unlikely heroes must destroy it before it destroys everything.

== Cast ==
- Frank Zagarino as Android
- Bryan Genesse as Frank Meade
- Beth Toussaint as Laurie Webber
- Daniel Bonjour as Ricky
- Todd Jensen as Joe Hutton
- Danny Keogh as John O'Hara
- Jeff Fannell as Carl Reitman
- Hal Orlandini as General McOwell
- Gavin Hood as Tieg
- Robin Smith as Prine
- Laura Steed as Red
- Frank Opperman as Wiggs
- Wilson Dunster as Edward Johnson
- Kimberleigh Stark as Carla
- Ted Le Plat as Jim Clarke
- Gideon Emery as Field Technician
- Adrian Waldron as John O'Hara's Aide
- Greg Latter as Front Gate Guard
- Steve Burgess as Jack Thompson
- Iain Winter as Jesse (as Ian Winter)
- Peter Terry as Pathologist
- Frank Notaro as Coroner
- David Butler as Police Officer
- Melanie Walker as Stewardess
- Mike Huff as Pilot
- David C. Webb as Co-Pilot (as David Webb)
- Jeff Albert as Navigator
- Douglas Bristow as Military Official
- Dan Robbertse as Truck Driver
- John Lesley as President
- Bruce Millar as Presidential Advisor #1
- Paul Beresford as Presidential Advisor #2

== Release ==
=== Home media ===
The film was released on DVD in 2007 by Image Entertainment as a double feature with Project Shadowchaser III.

== Sequel ==
A sequel titled Project Shadowchaser III was released in 1995.

== See also ==
- Project Shadowchaser
- Project Shadowchaser III
- Project Shadowchaser IV
