= American Ninja V =

- Promotional release poster
- Directed by: Bobby Jean Leonard
- Written by: John Bryant Hedberg; Greg Latter; George Saunders
- Produced by: Ovidio G Assonitis
- Starring: David Bradley; Lee Reyes; Pat Morita; James Lew
- Music by: Daniel May
- Distributed by: Cannon Group; Warner Bros. Home Entertainment
- Release date: July 10, 1993
- Running time: 102 minutes
- Country: United States
- Language: English

American Ninja V is a 1993 American direct-to-video martial arts action film starring David Bradley and Lee Reyes. A standalone sequel to American Ninja 4: The Annihilation (1990), it is the fifth and final installment in the American Ninja franchise. It was directed by Bobby Jean Leonard and written by John Bryant Hedber, Greg Latter and George Saunders.

== Plot ==
Lee Reyes plays Hiro, Master Tetsu's grandnephew, who is the last of the true ninja. His granduncle sends him to apprentice under Joe Kastle, who is the American Ninja, to gain experience. Hiro cares only for his Game Gear and has little interest in the ways of the ninja. Joe in addition to being the American Ninja also owns a boat. In order to meet the American Ninja, Lisa "varnishes" his boat when in fact she was asked to "tarnish" it. While having dinner Lisa is kidnapped by 'Viper' and a host of multi-colored ninjas, and so the American Ninja and Hiro sneak onto a plane to Venezuela to save her. It is revealed that Lisa is the daughter of a scientist, under the employ of Glock, who is being forced to develop a nerve gas for a Latin American despot. Before the American Ninja and Hiro can rescue Lisa and her father from 'Viper', the mysterious ninja that appears and reappears with a puff of smoke, the American Ninja must reawaken the ancient ninja tradition within Hiro with a 5-minute training montage. 'Viper' is defeated in a climactic airplane battle scene, and Joe returns to South Florida to kiss Lisa on the bow of his boat.

== Cast ==
- David Bradley as Joe Kastle
- Lee Reyes as Hiro
- Anne Dupont as Lisa
- Pat Morita as Master Tetsu
- James Lew as "The Viper"
- Clement von Franckenstein as Glock
- Marc Fiorini as "Flathead"
- Aharon Ipale as Dr. Strobel
- Norman Burton as U.S. Ambassador On Caracas Halden
- Victor Cardenas as Victor Lebon
- Francisco Moreno as Emil
- Freddy Alvarado as Ramon
- Alfredo Sandoval as Zubino
- Julio Mujica as "Butcher"
- Tadashi Yamashita as Himself

== Production ==
The film is set in Los Angeles, Rome and Venezuela. This film was not originally intended to be part of the American Ninja franchise. Cannon Pictures made it under the title American Dragons (it is even shown on many cable TV stations with this title) but the title was changed to American Ninja V before release. This explains why star David Bradley plays Joe, a different character than the Sean Davidson character he played in American Ninja 3: Blood Hunt and American Ninja 4: The Annihilation. The working title was Little Ninja Man.
