= Danny Keogh =

Ugandan-born South African actor (1948–2019)

- Born: 3 March 1948; Kampala, Protectorate of Uganda
- Died: 23 July 2019 (aged 71)

Danny Keogh (3 March 1948 – 23 July 2019) was a Ugandan-born South African actor known for his roles in South African television programs such as Known Gods, Interrogation Room, and Julius Galt in Charlie Jade.

He was born on 3 March 1948 in Kampala, Uganda.

Danny Keogh played King Dunchaid in the film Northmen: A Viking Saga.

== Film ==
Year	Title	Role	Notes
1977	Golden Rendezvous	Attacker #7	
1978	Someone Like You	Willem Labuschagne	
1978	Witblits and Peach Brandy	Peter	
1978	The Fifth Season	Lukas Mellet	
1980	April 1980	Maj. Harrison	
1987	Shot Down	Manuel	
1987	n’ Wêreld Sonder Grense	Stranger	
1988	Dark Justice	Hamish Burns	
1989	The Rutanga Tapes	Dr. Blunt	
1989	Options	Phillipe	
1989	Kill Slade	Flannigan	
1989	Jobman	Prison Doctor	
1989	Wild Zone	Emilio Cortez	
1989	Forced Alliance	Jack Rattigan	
1990	Sweet murder	Jerry Scott	
1990	The Sandgrass People	Lieutenant Cox	
1990	African Express	Helmut	
1990	The Schoolmaster	Boetman Coetzee	
1990	A.W.O.L.	J.H van der Merwe	
1992	To the Death	Hank	
1994	Project Shadowchaser ll	John O’Hara	
1994	Kalahari Harry	Oscar Kowalski	
1995	The Mangler	Herb Diment	
1995	Hearts and Minds	Andries Fourie	
1997	Jump the Gun	J.J.	
1998	Operation Delta Force 3: Clear Target	Umberto Salvatore	
1999	Pirates of the Plain	Murzol	
2000	Falling Rocks	Gold Digger	
2000	In the Light of the Moon	Hunter	
2001	Pure Blood	Eugene	
2001	Malunde	Andy	
2002	Slash	Jethro	
2002	The Piano Player	James – Lawyer	
2003	Citizen Verdict	Lt. Joe Cook	
2003	Consequence	Pope	
2003	Dissonances	Bill	
2004	Wake of Death	Mac Hoggins	
2007	Goodbye Bafana	Coloner Stander	
2008	Starship Troopers 3: Marauder	Dr. Wiggs	
2008	Skin	Van Tonder	
2009	Tornado and the Kalahari Horse Whisperer	Barrie Burger	
2009	Invictus	Rugby President	
2010	Master Harold...and the Boys	Mr. Prentice	
2010	Death Race 2	Dr. Klein	
2011	Mister Bob	Walker Van Dijk	
2012	Labryinth	Bertrand Pelletier	2 episodes
2013	Zulu	Kruger	
2013	Durban Poison	Klippie	
2014	The Salvation	Calder Jenkins	
2014	Kite	Clive Thornhill	
2014	Northmen - A Viking Saga	King Dunchaid	
2015	Black Sails	Alfred Hamilton	
2016	Detour	Business Man	
2016	The Siege of Jadotville	Gorman's Father	
2016	Dora's Peace	Stavro	
2017	The Forgiven	Rian Blomfeld	
2018	The Harvesters	Oupa	
2018	The Red Sea Diving Resort	General Weiss	
