= David Toussaint =

American dramatist

- Born: April 23, 1964 (age 62); Walnut Creek, California, United States
- Education: University of California, Los Angeles
- Occupations: Writer, commentator, theatre critic, playwright, author
- Relatives: Beth Toussaint (sister)

David Toussaint (born April 23, 1964) is an American writer, commentator, theatre critic, playwright and author.

Toussaint is also a contributor to HuffPost.

== Biography ==
Born on April 23, 1964, to Maynard and Leona Toussaint in Walnut Creek, California, Toussaint is the youngest of five children including Beth Toussaint. While in high school, he was an intern for the Contra Costa Times in Walnut Creek and eventually was hired as an assistant to the real estate editor. From 1977 to 1979, Toussaint attended the American Conservatory Theater and toured as an actor throughout California with the theater's Young Conservatory group. He attended the University of California at Los Angeles with a major in English literature. Toussaint now lives in Manhattan.

== Career ==
Since 1997, Toussaint has written articles for Brides magazine, Conde Nast Traveler, Working Woman, Instinct, Gay Financial Network, Outsider Ink, Caribbean Travel and Life and Diversion magazine. He has been an editor at Conde Nast and a three-time guest editor for Francis Ford Coppola's online magazine Zoetrope, and was a full-time columnist for GayWeddings.com. Currently he writes a weekly column and is a theater critic for EDGE magazine, and is the senior editor for GuySpy.com. In 2003, Toussaint wrote an article entitled Outward Bound on same-sex weddings for Brides magazine. It was the first article on gay and lesbian weddings to be published by any of the five major, top-selling bridal magazines, and its publication created a significant controversy.

Toussaint's book, Gay and Lesbian Weddings: Planning the Perfect Same-Sex Ceremony was published by Ballantine Books in 2004, and his May 2009 ebook, Toussaint, was published by Stay Thirsty Publishing. Toussaint's book "The Gay Couples Guide to Wedding Planning" was published by Sellers Publishing in 2012. His book "DJ: The Dog Who Rescued Me" was published by Turn the Page Publishing in 2013. Toussaint wrote, produced and directed a one-act play, Backstage Bitches, which ran for two consecutive summers in New York City (1998–1999). The play starred a young Jake Robards, son of Jason Robards, in his professional acting debut. Toussaint acted in the 2008 film Dissonance.

== Works ==
=== Non-fiction ===
- "DJ: The Dog Who Rescued ME," Turn the Page Publishing, 2013
- "The Gay Couples Guide to Wedding Planning," Sellers Publishing, 2012
- TOUSSAINT!, Stay Thirsty Press, 2009
- Gay and Lesbian Weddings: Planning the Perfect Same-Sex Ceremony, Ballantine, 2004

=== Short fiction ===
- Fire, Literary Potpourri, 2003
- The Dream of the Rabbits, Snow Monkey, 2002
