= Bryan Genesse =

Canadian actor (born 1964)

- Born: March 20, 1964 (age 62); Hamilton, Ontario, Canada
- Occupation: Actor
- Years active: 1983–present
- Spouse: Brooke Theiss
- Children: 2

Bryan Genesse is a Canadian actor and martial artist, perhaps best known for his action roles on the television series Street Justice, and in early productions of the Nu Image film company.

== Career ==
=== Early years ===
Genesse was born in Hamilton, Ontario, but grew up in Welland, in the same province. At age 13, he got into martial arts in order to stand up to bullies. He discovered his interest for acting when he took part in a high school play, and subsequently attended drama school at George Brown College in Toronto. However, he left after a year to fast track his professional career. Genesse quickly garnered minor roles in Canadian-filmed series, and moved to New York City when he was 19 to further improve his professional network. He remained there for three and a half years, while still pursuing gigs in his native Canada. The actor first gained notice playing womanizing types in raunchy comedies, making his feature debut as the lead in 1985's Screwballs II, followed by two antagonistic turns, as a British rock star in Blake Edwards' Skin Deep and a lecherous, conniving nightclub owner in California Casanova (wrapped in 1989 but belatedly released in 1991).

Genesse was also asked to read for the character of Storm Logan in the new soap opera The Bold and the Beautiful. Mistakenly believing that the character's nickname reflected his lifestyle, when he was in fact a regular lawyer, Genesse went to the audition in streetwear and sporting a spiky hairdo. The shows' producers were taken aback at first, but found the irreverent style to be a welcome departure from daytime drama conventions, and wrote a brand new character to accommodate him, called Rocco Carner. While most press profiles at the time emphasized the sensitive image befitting of a soap star, his slightly edgier persona allowed for sporadic allusions to his martial arts background, and he did pose for a few glamour shots with traditional Asian weapons. Genesse also hosted a semi-fictional children's instructional video made by former Cannon executives to bank on the Teenage Mutant Ninja Turtles phenomenon, entitled How to Become a Teenage Ninja.

=== Transition to action roles ===
While making B&B-related personal appearances in Italy, Genesse was called back to Los Angeles to audition for Stephen Cannell's next series to be shot in Canada, Street Justice, in a role that would take advantage of his interest for martial arts. In addition to starring on the show, he served as fight choreographer. Street Justice led to an image change for Genesse, who was featured on the cover of several martial arts magazines, such as CFW's Inside Kung Fu and Kung Fu Masters.

Following the series' two-season run, Genesse was approached to star in action films made by Nu Image, a fledgling company then primarily based in South Africa. He debuted for them in Night Siege: Project Shadowchaser II opposite Frank Zagarino. The two would become friends and co-star in several more movies. A few months later, Genesse received top billing in Human Timebomb, which Nu Image's U.S. distributor, New Line, chose to rebrand as a sequel to their 1992 film Live Wire in the territory. It was also successful in Japan, and earned the actor a multi-picture contract from Nu Image, with whom he has remained closely associated for most of his career.

Genesse, who had contemplated writing since his early days as a performer, scripted and co-produced 2000's The Alternate, in which he also acted alongside his wife Brooke Theiss, Eric Roberts, Ice-T and Michael Madsen. After Madsen expressed interest in teaming up again, Genesse put together Bad Guys, which marked his second writing credit and his directorial debut. However, the film was affected by turmoil at production company Giants Entertainment and only saw release in a handful of markets.

In 2003, Genesse had a serious accident while filming a combat stunt on Fire, part of Nu Image's Nature Unleashed series of disaster films. He suffered knee, hamstring and back injuries, which left him with walking difficulties. The actor went through a lengthy rehabilitation process in his native Canada, which took between five and six years—partly due to insurance issues—and virtually ended his acting career. He did appear in a minor role in Edison, a 2005 crime drama from Nu Image's premium production arm, Millennium Films.

=== Return to television ===
Following a lengthy hiatus from the screen, Genesse returned to his soap opera roots on The Bold and the Beautiful. He reprised his early role of Rocco Carner, with the first episode of his story arc airing on March 12, 2009.

== Martial arts ==
Genesse's first martial art was taekwondo. He later added other styles to his repertoire, such as hung gar kung fu and Brazilian jiu-jitsu, in which he claims a black belt, awarded in 2014 by Jean-Jacques Machado. He is also a self defense and martial arts professor. After teaching under senior instructors, he opened his own school, named Venom BJJ and located in Valencia, California, as of 2024.

== Personal life ==
Genesse has been married to actress Brooke Theiss since 1994. They have two children, born in 1995 and 2008. He also works as a real estate agent in Southern California.

== Filmography ==
=== Film ===
Year	Title	Role	Notes
1983	The Dead Zone	Unknown	Only mentioned in early biographies. Possible extra or walk-on appearances.
1984	Police Academy	Unknown	Only mentioned in early biographies. Possible extra or walk-on appearances.
1985	Loose Screws	Brad Lovett	Released in the U.S. as Screwballs II
1989	Skin Deep	Rick	
1991	California Casanova	Leech	
1994	Night Siege: Project Shadowchaser II	Frank Meade	Also martial arts coordinator
1995	Human Timebomb	Parker	Also martial arts choreographer Released in the U.S. as Live Wire: Human Timebomb
1995	Cyborg Cop III	Max	Released in the U.S. as Terminal Impact
1995	Terminal Virus	Joe Knight	
1998	Spoiler	Bounty n°1	
1998	The Company Man	Lewis	Released in the U.S. as Deadly Reckoning
1998	Operation Delta Force 3: Clear Target	Hutch	
1999	Cold Harvest	Little Ray	
1999	Traitor's Heart	Nick Brody	
2000	The Guardian	Steve Layton	
2000	The Alternate	The Leader	Also co-producer, writer and fight choreographer Released in the U.S. as Agent of Death
2000	Bad Guys	Jack Ford	Also writer and director Also known as Bad Guys in Hell
2002	The Circuit	Vixton Hack	
2003	Death Train	Ryan	
2003	Sometimes A Hero	Remo	Released in the U.S. as Cold Vengeance
2004	Nature Unleashed: Fire	Jake	
2005	Edison	Campos	Released in the U.S. as Edison Force

=== Television ===
Year	Title	Role	Notes
Unknown	Bizarre	Unknown	
Unknown	Sons and Daughters	Unknown	Also known as An Ounce of Cure
1985	The Littlest Hobo	Hamish Welsh	Episode: "Torque"
1986	Perry Mason: The Case of the Shooting Star	Dak Foster	
1987–89 2009	The Bold and the Beautiful	Rocco Carner	180 episodes
1989	Just the Ten of Us	Blitz	Episode: "Betrayal"
1990	Growing Pains	Shiv	Episode: "Future Shock" Analogous character to the one played on Just the Ten of Us
1991–93	Street Justice	Grady Jameson	44 episodes
1994	Lifestories: Families in Crisis	Bryce	Episode: "A Body to Die For: The Aaron Henry Story"
2001–02	Cold Squad	Dan	8 episodes
2002	Mary Higgins Clark's We'll Meet Again	Tim	
