= Westbeach =

- Genre: Drama
- Created by: Tony Marchant
- Starring: Oliver Cotton; Deborah Grant
- Country of origin: United Kingdom
- Original language: English
- No. of series: 1
- No. of episodes: 10

Production
- Producer: Susi Hush
- Production company: WitzEnd Productions

Original release
- Network: BBC1
- Release: 10 April – 19 June 1993

Westbeach is a British television series produced by WitzEnd Productions for the BBC in 1993.

The series is set in the fictional seaside town of Westbeach (filmed on location in Eastbourne) and deals with two rival families, the Cromers and the Prestons, who control the local businesses. The Preston family owns an upmarket seafront hotel, while the Cromers run an amusement arcade and a fish-and-chip shop. One series of ten episodes was produced.

The Times described the "dismal performance" of the BBC's three new flagship dramas which included Westbeach, the programme only achieved 6.27 million viewers and was ranked 69th.

== Cast ==
- Oliver Cotton – Alan Cromer
- Deborah Grant – Sarah Preston
- Michael Attwell – Ray Cromer
- Debby Bishop – Yola Cromer
- Lesley Duff – Maggie Cromer
- David Horovitch – Hugo Preston
- Annie Lambert – Alex Preston
- Imogen Boorman – Hannah Preston
- Tony Caunter – Bill Cromer
- Lee Ross – Chris Cromer
- Ricco Ross – Greg Dacosta
- Edna Doré – Iris Cromer
- Jo Warne – Betty Cromer
- Cherith Mellor – Jean Cromer
- Ben Porter – Simon Cromer
- Siobhan Burke – Jan Cromer
- Pat Keen – Florrie Dawson
- Alison Lomas – Angela

== Episodes ==
Number	Title	Writer	Broadcast
1	Just Another Saturday	Tony Marchant	10 April 1993
2	Rain or Shines	Lou Wakefield	17 April 1993
3	Come on Bay, Light my Fire	Gerard Macdonald	24 April 1993
4	Presence of Malice	Kieran Prendiville	1 May 1993
5	Young and Shingle	Steve Coombes and Dave Robinson	8 May 1993
6	A Nice Little Erma	Steve Coombes and Dave Robinson	22 May 1993
7	Trouble and Strife	Tony Marchant	29 May 1993
8	Last Chance Saloon	Gerard Macdonald	5 June 1993
9	Pier Pressure	Tony Marchant	12 June 1993
10	Baby You Can Drive My Car	Kieran Prendiville	19 June 1993
