= David Bradley (American actor) =

American actor

- Born: Bradley Simpson; October 2, 1953 (age 72); Texas, U.S.
- Occupation: Actor
- Years active: 1989–1997

David Bradley (born Bradley Simpson, October 2, 1953) is an American actor and martial artist, known for starring in numerous low-budget action movies beginning in the late 1980s. His best-known films are the American Ninja sequels, and the Cyborg Cop films.

== Career ==
Bradley is known for his role as Sean Davidson in American Ninja 3: Blood Hunt and American Ninja 4: The Annihilation. He also stars in a separate film titled, American Ninja V, as Joe Kastle, which is not technically a sequel to the previous American Ninja films, but a different movie altogether. Previous to making films, Bradley worked as a car salesman on Wilshire Boulevard. He attended the screening of American Ninja 3: Blood Hunt in Los Angeles, and director Cedric Sundstrom claimed that he in Bradley found a good balance between vulnerability and physical aspects. According to Sundstrom, Bradley always resented the fact that his character got rescued by Michael Dudikoff's character in the film American Ninja 4: The Annihilation.

== Personal life ==
Bradley is trained in Shotokan Karate (black belt), Taekwondo (4th Dan black belt), Kung Fu, Aikido and weapons.

== Film ==
Year	Title	Role	Notes
1997	Crisis	Alex	Direct-to-video
1997	Expect to Die	Dr. Vincent MaxIntyre	Direct-to-video
1997	Total Reality	Lieutenant Anthony Rand	Direct-to-video
1996	White Cargo	Joe Hargatay	Direct-to-video
1996	Exit	Charles	Direct-to-video
1995	Hard Justice	ATF Agent Nick Adams	Direct-to-video
1994	Blood Run	Brad Kingsbury	Television film
1994	Cyborg Cop II	DEA Agent Jack Ryan	Direct-to-video
1993	Blood Warriors	Wes Healey	Television film
1993	Cyborg Cop	DEA Agent Jack Ryan	Direct-to-video
1993	American Ninja V	Joe Kastle	Direct-to-video
1992	American Samurai	Andrew "Drew" Collins	Direct-to-video
1991	Lower Level	Sam L. Browning	Direct-to-video
1990	American Ninja 4: The Annihilation	Agent Sean Davidson	
1989	American Ninja 3: Blood Hunt	Sean Davidson	First feature film
1989	Murder, She Wrote	Adam Perry	TV series ("Trevor Hudson's Legacy")
