= Nate and the Colonel =

2003 film

- Directed by: Paul Winters
- Written by: Paul Winters
- Starring: Paul Winters; Ricco Ross
- Edited by: Paul Winters
- Music by: Terry Plumeri
- Release date: 2003
- Languages: English, Ojibwe

Nate and the Colonel is a 2003 Western film written, directed and edited by Paul Winters.

The film also stars Winters as Colonel Ben Loftin and Ricco Ross as Nate. Nate and the Colonel is the first feature film to use the Native American Ojibwe language (for the first half of the film, the Native actors only speak in the Ojibwa language with English sub-titles). The film also stars Mark S. Brien and Carlos Milano. Milano also produced the film and accepted the "Best Feature Film Award" at the 2004 American Indian LA Film and TV Awards.

== Plot ==
The year is 1865, and the American Civil War has just ended. Former slave Nate Washington and his boyhood friend, Confederate Colonel Ben Loftin head west together from the Southern United States which lie in ruins. On the Western Plains, they encounter a band of Chippewa Indians who will forever change their lives. Along the way, they must deal with a renegade band of Union Cavalry with a score to settle.
