= Street Justice =

American television series

- Street Justice Season One DVD Cover
- Genre: Crime drama Action
- Created by: David Levinson; Mark Lisson; David H. Balkan
- Directed by: David Winning
- Starring: Carl Weathers; Bryan Genesse; Charlene Fernetz; Marcus Chong
- Composer: Lawrence Shragge
- Countries of origin: Canada; United States
- Original language: English
- No. of seasons: 2
- No. of episodes: 43

Production
- Executive producers: Ann Donahue; Jonathan Glassner; David Levinson
- Producer: N. John Smith
- Production location: Vancouver
- Camera setup: Single-camera
- Running time: 43–45 minutes
- Production companies: Stephen J. Cannell Productions (1991–1992) (season 1); Cannell Entertainment (1992–1993) (season 2)

Original release
- Network: Syndication
- Release: September 29, 1991 – May 29, 1993

Street Justice is a Canadian-American action crime drama series starring Carl Weathers and Bryan Genesse. The series began airing in syndication in 1991, and was canceled in 1993 after two seasons.

== Synopsis ==
The series revolves around U.S. Army Special Forces Soldier-turned-metropolitan police detective, Adam Beaudreaux (Weathers) and Grady Jameson (Genesse), a Canadian martial arts expert. As a child, Grady saved Adam's life when he was wounded-in-action during the Vietnam War. Grady's parents, who were Canadian missionaries, were killed when the Viet Cong burned down their village. After the encounter, the two formed a bond and were together in Vietnam for 10 months until Adam was sent back to the United States and discharged from service. Adam promised Grady that he would come back for him. In 1972, Adam became a police officer and began a 20-year search for the boy who had saved his life. In the intervening years, Grady was forced to steal to survive on the mean streets in Vietnam. He was eventually arrested and imprisoned for 10 1/2 years. Grady learned martial arts in prison in order to stay alive. Adam and Grady are finally reunited in 1991 when Grady finds his way to the U.S. and shows up at Adam's place while in pursuit of the man he holds responsible for his parents' murder.

Adam puts Grady to work at the bar he co-owns with his friend, Malloy (Charlene Fernetz), the daughter of his deceased partner. Grady soon begins helping Adam on cases using the knowledge he picked up living on the streets along with his martial arts training. Miguel Mendez (Marcus Chong) appears early in the series as a gang leader and adversary of Adam and Grady, and is eventually arrested and sent to a youth camp. Following his release, he assists the two from time to time. Chong was credited as a guest star throughout Season 1, then added to the main cast at the beginning of Season 2.

== Cast ==
=== Main ===
- Carl Weathers as Adam Beaudreaux
- Bryan Genesse as Grady Jameson
- Charlene Fernetz as Malloy
- Marcus Chong as Miguel Mendez (Season 2; guest appearances in Season 1)

=== Recurring ===
- Eric McCormack as Detective Eric Rothman (18 episodes)
- Janne Mortil as Detective Tricia Kelsey
- Ken Tremblett as Detective Paul Schuham (11 episodes)
- Leam Blackwood as Lt. Charles Pine

=== Guest stars ===
- Tamsin Kelsey (6 episodes)
- Sandra P. Grant
- Lisa Vultaggio
- Steve Bacic (3 episodes)
- Carrie-Anne Moss (2 episodes)
- Beverley Hendry (2 episodes)
- Ken Camroux (2 episodes)
- Buster Douglas
- Christianne Hirt
- Walter Marsh
- Victor Young (2 episodes)
- John Tench
- Eric Keenleyside (2 episodes)
- Rick Poltaruk
- Wren Robertz
- Kim Coates
- Aki Aleong
- Stephen E. Miller
- Salma Hayek
- Larry Manetti
- Dwight McFee
- Robert McNeil
- Beau Starr
- Pat Harrington Jr.
- Oliver Becker
- Jano Frandsen
- Jill Teed
- Scott Jaeck
- Johnny Cuthbert
- John Novak (2 episodes)
- Roark Critchlow
- Debbie Gibson
- Tom McBeath
- Dustin Nguyen
- Kim Kondrashoff
- Marc Baur
- Roger R. Cross (2 episodes)
- Kevin McNulty (2 episodes)
- Melanie Nicholls-King
- Billy Blanks
- Amy Yasbeck
- Collin Raye
- R. Lee Ermey
- Peter DeLuise
- Don S. Davis
- Steve Kahan
- Omar Epps
- Alfonso Quijada (3 episodes)
- Alex Datcher (2 episodes)
- Travis MacDonald
- Jim Byrnes
- Earl Pastko
- Jay Brazeau
- Kathy Long
- Benjamin Ratner
- Rob Morton
- Steven Williams
- Bo Svenson

=== Notes ===
Marcus Chong and Carrie-Anne Moss would reunite years later in The Matrix.

== Episodes ==
=== Season 1 (1991–92) ===
No. overall	No. in season	Title	Directed by	Written by	Original release date
1	1	"Legacy"	Bill Corcoran	David Levinson & Jonathan Glassner	September 29, 1991
2	2	"Legacy"	Bill Corcoran	David Levinson & Jonathan Glassner	September 29, 1991
While protecting a hitman for a local crime boss, police detective Adam Beaudreaux hires a friend of his to track down Grady Jameson, to whom he feels indebted for saving his life in Vietnam nearly 20 years ago. Grady and Beaudreaux work together when it's revealed that killer was involved with the death of Grady's parents.
3	3	"Loyalties"	Unknown	Unknown	October 5, 1991
Adam is asked to keep a friend's daughter out of a gang.
4	4	"Kid Stuff"	Unknown	Unknown	October 12, 1991
Grady's girlfriend asks him to help kidnap her son from his abusive foster parents.
5	5	"Tables Turned"	Unknown	Unknown	October 19, 1991
Adam agrees to help an attorney who got a rapist he arrested off when the man begins to stalk her.
6	6	"Shadows"	Unknown	Unknown	October 26, 1991
Adam is placed in protective custody when two officers turn up dead.
7	7	"Sanctuary"	Unknown	Unknown	November 2, 1991
Grady takes an abused young woman under his wing.
8	8	"The Group"	Unknown	Unknown	November 9, 1991
The past comes back to haunt Adam when young Asian women are being murdered, and he believes it to be the work of new members of a group of Vietnam vets.
9	9	"Friendly Fire"	Unknown	Unknown	November 16, 1991
10	10	"Self Defense"	Unknown	Unknown	November 23, 1991
11	11	"Bashing"	Unknown	Unknown	November 30, 1991
12	12	"Homecoming"	Unknown	Unknown	January 11, 1992
13	13	"Parenthood"	Unknown	Unknown	January 18, 1992
14	14	"Partner in Crime"	Unknown	Unknown	January 25, 1992
15	15	"Protectors"	Unknown	Unknown	February 1, 1992
16	16	"Backbeat"	Unknown	Unknown	February 15, 1992
17	17	"Debt of Honor"	Unknown	Unknown	February 22, 1992
18	18	"Bad Choices"	Unknown	Unknown	February 29, 1992
19	19	"Eye Witness"	Unknown	Unknown	April 25, 1992
20	20	"The Long Way Home"	Unknown	Unknown	May 2, 1992
21	21	"Catcher"	Unknown	Unknown	May 9, 1992
22	22	"Missing"	Unknown	Unknown	May 16, 1992

=== Season 2 (1992–93) ===
No. overall	No. in season	Title	Directed by	Written by	Original release date
23	1	"Death Warmed Over"	René Bonnière	Jonathan Glassner	October 3, 1992
24	2	"Circle of Death"	Brad Turner	Steven Long Mitchell & Craig W. Van Sickle	October 10, 1992
25	3	"Cross Fire"	René Bonnière	Carleton Eastlake	October 17, 1992
26	4	"Feet of Clay"	Brad Turner	David Kemper	October 24, 1992
27	5	"Each One, Teach One"	Bill Corcoran	Steven Long Mitchell & Craig W. Van Sickle and Jonathan Glassner & Carleton Eastlake	October 31, 1992
28	6	"Country Justice"	David Winning	Jonathan Glassner	November 7, 1992
29	7	"Back From the Dead Again"	Paul Shapiro	Steven Long Mitchell & Craig W. Van Sickle	November 14, 1992
30	8	"Innocent Blood"	David Winning	John Whelpley	November 21, 1992
31	9	"Angel of Death"	David Winning	Paul M. Belous	November 28, 1992
32	10	"Remember Me"	Brad Turner	Vivienne Radkoff	January 9, 1993
33	11	"Black or Blue"	Brad Turner	Jay Huguely	January 16, 1993
34	12	"Bitter Fruit"	Jeff Woolnough	I.C. Rapoport	January 23, 1993
35	13	"A Sense of Duty"	David Winning	Barry Schkolnick	January 30, 1993
36	14	"Obsession"	Brenton Spencer	Barry Schkolnick	February 6, 1993
37	15	"Honor and Trust"	Brad Turner	David Kemper	February 13, 1993
38	16	"On My Honor"	Brenton Spencer	Vivienne Radkoff	February 20, 1993
39	17	"The Cost of Peace"	René Bonnière	Jonathan Glassner	February 27, 1993
40	18	"Countdown"	Brad Turner	Vivienne Radkoff	March 6, 1993
41	19	"Hello Again"	David Winning	Vivienne Radkoff	May 8, 1993
42	20	"The Wall"	Brad Turner	Todd Trotter	May 15, 1993
43	21	"My Brother's Keeper"	René Bonnière	Steven Long Mitchell & Craig W. Van Sickle	May 22, 1993
44	22	"Desperate"	Jeff Woolnough	Carleton Eastlake	May 29, 1993

== Home media ==
Visual Entertainment has released both seasons of Street Justice on DVD in Canada.

On March 22, 2011, VEI released Street Justice: The Complete Series on DVD in Canada. The 10-disc boxset features all 43 episodes of the series.

DVD name	Ep #	Release date
The Complete First Season	21	November 7, 2006
The Complete Second and Final Season	22	November 25, 2008
The Complete Series	43	March 22, 2011

== Awards and nominations ==
Chicago International Film Festival

- Won: Best Direction, Dramatic Series, David Winning (for episode 1.13 "Parenthood", 1993)
