= Operation Delta Force 5: Random Fire =

2000 film by Yossi Wein

- Official DVD cover
- Directed by: Yossi Wein
- Written by: Danny Lerner (Story); Bernard Stone (Screenplay)
- Produced by: Marlow De Mardt; Danny Lerner; Brigid Olen
- Starring: Trae Thomas; Todd Jensen; Anthony Bishop; Gray Lawson; Pepper Sweeney
- Cinematography: Peter Belcher
- Edited by: Amanda I. Kirpaul
- Music by: Serge Colbert
- Production companies: Nu Image / Millennium Films; Martien Holdings A.V.V. City Heat Productions; Operator Films LLC
- Distributed by: Columbia TriStar Home Video
- Release date: 2000 (USA)
- Running time: 91 minutes
- Country: United States
- Language: English

Operation Delta Force 5: Random Fire is a 2000 American direct-to-video action film starring Trae Thomas, Todd Jensen and Anthony Bishop. It was directed by Yossi Wein. A standalone sequel to Operation Delta Force 4: Deep Fault (1999), it is the fifth installment in the Operation Delta Force film series.

== Plot ==
An elite task force is assigned to handle a Middle-Eastern terrorist mastermind who is using mind-control techniques to create an army of willing suicide bombers.

== Cast ==
- Trae Thomas as Brad Kennedy
- Todd Jensen as Bob Johnson
- Anthony Bishop as Skip Loomis
- Gray Lawson as Scott
- Pepper Sweeney as Charlie Moore
- David Dukas as Phil
- Jason Kennett as Richie Troy
- David S. Lee as David Berman
- Nick Boraine as Gary
- Graeme Richards as Cedric
- Andrew Webster as Duke
- Cliff Simon as Austin
- Sean Witting as Vince Oli
- Brendan Pollecutt as Jackson
- Neville Strydom as Bruce a.k.a. "Chopper", Pilot
- Emily Whitefield as Karen Sommers
- Ron Smerczak as General Thompson
- Greg Melvill-Smith as Kito
- Clive Scott as Ambassador Clarence Rodman
- Dudley Correira as Lieutenant Marshall
- Akin Omotoso as Vice Consul Williams
- Tony Caprari as Jafari Bin Kasim
- Annabel Linder as Mrs. Berman
- David Sherwood as Mr. Berman
- Justin Cohen as Ruben Berman
- Justine Breytenbach as Rodman Twin #1
- Melanie Breytenbach as Rodman Twin #2
- Michael Brunner as Dr. Kolavich (uncredited)

== Reception ==
In 2013 MonsterHunter Reviews(website link with his review at external links)gived the review to this film,heres his short summary of this review:

"In this fifth installment, the Delta Force unit returns to track down an evil terrorist who uses mind control to turn his captives into suicide bombers. However, the plot makes so little sense that you start to feel like you're under mind control yourself! Major plot points and character arguments are set up, only to be completely ignored or forgotten minutes later. Overall, it’s a dismal finale to the series that fans can easily skip."

At 2026 on IMDb film had score 3.3/10.
