= The Alternate (film) =

- Directed by: Sam Firstenberg
- Written by: Bryan Genesse
- Produced by: Frank DeMartini
- Starring: Eric Roberts; Bryan Genesse; Ice-T; Michael Madsen; John Beck
- Cinematography: Gerry Lively
- Edited by: Marcus Manton
- Music by: Serge Colbert; Robert J. Schuster
- Production company: Nu Image Films
- Release date: March 1, 2000
- Running time: 95 minutes
- Country: United States
- Language: English
- Budget: $1,700,000

The Alternate (known in the U.S. as Agent of Death) is a 2000 American action film directed by Sam Firstenberg, and starring Eric Roberts, Bryan Genesse, Ice-T and Michael Madsen.

== Plot ==
The president of the United States is kidnapped during a charity event. The kidnapping was orchestrated by his chief of staff to boost the president's popularity for the upcoming elections. However, one of the kidnappers decides the opportunity is too good to pass up and turns it into a real kidnapping while a fellow kidnapper is determined to foil his plan.

== Cast ==
- Eric Roberts as The Alternate
- Bryan Genesse as The Leader
- Ice-T as Agent Williams
- Michael Madsen as Agent Jack Briggs
- John Beck as President John Fallbrook
- Brooke Theiss as Mary
- Larry Manetti as Agent Harris
- Eliza Roberts as Chief of Staff Donaldson
- J. Cynthia Brooks as Mrs. Fallbrook
- Richard Steinmetz as SWAT Leader
- Ronn Moss as Fake President
