= Death, Deceit and Destiny Aboard the Orient Express =

- Directed by: Mark Roper
- Written by: Peter Jobin; Harry Alan Towers (as Peter Welbeck)
- Produced by: Harry Alan Towers
- Starring: Richard Grieco; Christoph Waltz; Romina Mondello; Jennifer Nitsch; Hunter Phoenix; Götz Otto; Hristo Shopov
- Cinematography: Adolfo Bartoli
- Music by: Stelvio Cipriani
- Distributed by: e-m-s the DVD Company
- Release date: 2000
- Running time: 92 min.
- Countries: United States; Canada; Bulgaria
- Language: English

Death, Deceit and Destiny Aboard the Orient Express is a 2000 thriller film about a group of international terrorists who, a few days before the start of the new millennium, lure a group of very rich celebrities and businesspeople on board the Orient Express from Paris to Istanbul in order to extort large sums of money from them. The screenplay for the movie was written by Peter Welbeck (aka Harry Alan Towers) and Peter Jobin. The film, which was directed by Mark Roper, starred Richard Grieco, Joanna Bukovska, Romina Mondello, Christoph Waltz, Sendhil Ramamurthy and Götz Otto.

== Plot ==
When an anonymous benefactor invites a party of celebrities and business magnates to a New Year's celebration aboard the Orient Express, it is the guests' greed which brings them all together. Apart from an enjoyable free trip on the luxury train, the businessmen among the passengers also expect to make a lucrative deal. However, just outside Paris the whole train is taken over by terrorists—without anybody noticing. Jack Chase (Richard Grieco), a young American actor who has also been invited, realizes that one of the waiters is missing but does not know that he has been killed together with all his colleagues.

Very soon the passengers sense that something is wrong. For example, a powerful jamming station on board the train ensures that they cannot contact the outside world via their mobile phones. Then, before dinner, they get to know their host: It is Tarik (Christoph Waltz), a well-known, internationally wanted Arab terrorist, who communicates with them via interactive television. Tarik announces the "Fundamentalist Revolution", the "victory of faith over corruption", and demands one tenth of each of his hostages' fortunes. Tarik himself is in fact on the train disguised as a cook, but no one has so far found out. The captives also learn that the terrorists have rigged the train with explosives: If the train slows, stops or passes the midnight hour the bombs are rigged to blow.

Predictably, the passengers try to do something about their predicament. While the businessmen ponder the question of whether to pay up or not, it is the women who take an active part in fighting the terrorists, most notably Nadia (Joanna Bukovska), a young Russian dancer who has fallen in love with Chase and who even saves his life when he is attacked by one of the thugs. The couple secretly climb on the roof of the train and succeed in finding some of the explosives. In the end, shortly before their arrival in Istanbul, the locomotive, with Tarik in it, is uncoupled from the rest of the train and blown to pieces by the bombs planted by the terrorist himself.

== Themes ==
Although the film was released long before the September 11, 2001 terrorist attacks, the character of Tarik is a thinly disguised Osama bin Laden. There are also some minor but obvious parallels to the 1974 film Murder on the Orient Express, which is based on an Agatha Christie novel. These parallels almost exclusively concern the setting and the constellation of characters: There are no similarities whatsoever regarding the plot.

== Cast ==
- Richard Grieco as Jack Chase
- Nicky Henson as Tom Finlay
- Barry Flatman as Reid Archer
- Jennifer Nitsch as Rita Evans
- Lou Hirsch as Fred Wallace
- Gotz Otto as Boris
- Romina Mondello as Klara
- Christoph Waltz as Tarik
- Yoanna Boukovska as Nadia
- Hunter Phoenix as Natasha
- Nina Muschallik as Polly
- Sendhil Ramamurthy as Nikki
- Jana Karaivanova as Imogen
- Anjela Lauren Smith as Nora
- Hristo Shopov as Chief Du Train
- Dechko Chuntov as Terrorist Leader
- Ilian Simeonov as Terrorist
- Delyan Dabov as Evil Barman
- Antonio Milenov as Evil Steward #1
- Emil Videv as Evil Steward #2
- Michail Elenov as Evil Steward #3
- Hristo Paskalev as Evil Waiter #1
- Daniel Tzotchev as Evil Waiter #2
- Petia as Girl #1
- Rada as Girl #2
