= Ricco Ross =

American actor (born 1958)

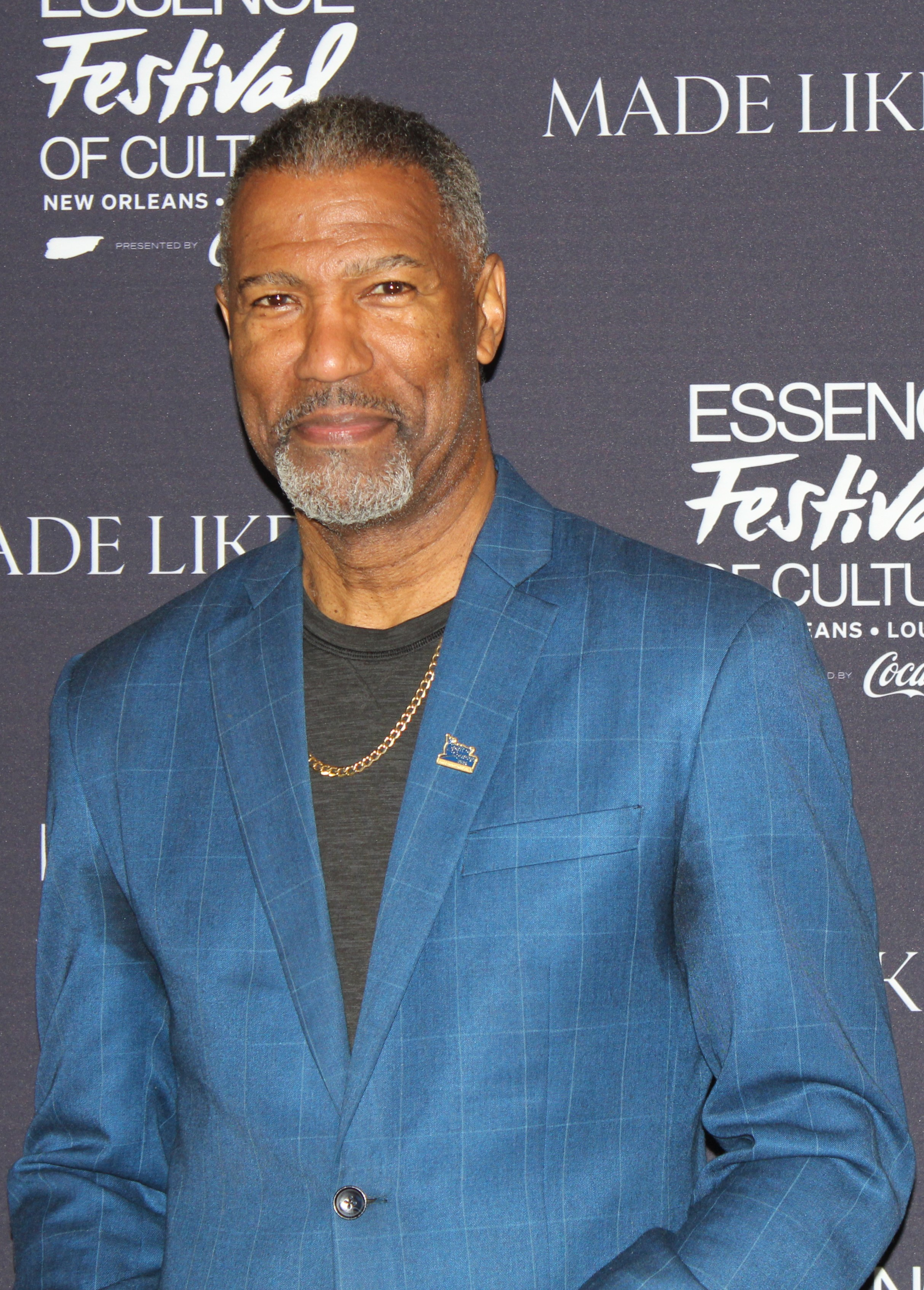
- Ricco Ross at EssenceFest 2025 in July
- Born: Chicago, Illinois, U.S.
- Occupation: Actor
- Years active: 1982–present
- Children: 2

Ricco Ross is an American actor. He is best known for his portrayal of Private Frost in the 1986 science fiction action film Aliens and currently as Horace Bellarie in Tyler Perry's Netflix's drama series Beauty in Black.

== Early life ==
Ross was born in Chicago.

== Career ==
Ross' first television role was as an extra on The Young and the Restless, which was followed by a small part in Hill Street Blues and the male lead in the music video for Whitney Houston's 1985 hit song "Saving All My Love for You". He later played Private Ricco Frost in the film Aliens (1986), and also appeared in the films Death Wish 3 (1985), Spies Like Us (1985), The Dirty Dozen: Next Mission (1985 TV film), "Displaced Person" (1985 episode of American Playhouse), Gulliver's Travels (1996), Mission Impossible (1996), Fierce Creatures (1997), Nate and the Colonel (2003) and Hydra (2009).

From the late 1980s to the early 1990s, he lived and worked in the United Kingdom. He portrayed Greg Dacosta on the BBC1 drama Westbeach. While there, he made guest appearances in Doctor Who (in the 1988 serial The Greatest Show in the Galaxy) and Jeeves and Wooster, and played a supporting role as CIA agent Karl Richfield in the 1991 mini-series Sleepers.

Ross now appears in various commercials as well as TV shows aired throughout the United States.

=== Aliens ===
Ricco Ross originally read for the part of Corporal Hicks. He was then offered the role of Private Drake, but he turned it down in favour of appearing in Full Metal Jacket. However, James Cameron was so impressed with Ross' audition that he wrote the character of Frost specifically for him, and as a result Ross left Kubrick's production to appear in Aliens. In a 2014 interview for the podcast I Was There Too, Ross stated that Private Frost's first name is actually Robert.

=== Stage ===
In 1994 Ross toured Great Britain performing in the play Skin.

== Filmography ==
=== Film ===
Year	Title	Role	Notes
1983	Scarred	-	
1985	The Dirty Dozen: Next Mission	Arlen Dregors	TV movie
1985	Death Wish 3	The Cuban	
1985	Spies Like Us	WAMP Guard	
1986	Aliens	Private Frost	
1987	The Return of Sherlock Holmes	Matthew	TV movie
1987	Body Contact	Smiley	
1988	Crusoe	2nd Victim	
1989	Slipstream	1st Man at Table	
1989	Murder on the Moon	Alvarado	TV movie
1989	The Return of Sam McCloud	Rifkin	TV movie
1992	Project Shadowchaser	Jackson	
1993	Passport to Murder	Dealer	TV movie
1995	Project Shadowchaser 3000	Lennox	Video
1995	Hackers	Second Reporter	
1995	Proteus	Buckley	
1996	Mission: Impossible	Denied Area Security Guard	
1996	Timelock	Tibuck	
1997	Fierce Creatures	TV Journalist	
1997	Wishmaster	Lt. Nathanson	
2000	Octopus	Brickman	
2002	The Tower of Babble	Clint	Short
2003	Nate and the Colonel	Nate Washington	
2007	Alls Well That Ends Well	Billy Shakes	Short
2007	Santa Croce	Crazed Proclaimer	Short
2009	The Least Among You	Marvin Kelly	
2009	Hydra	Broughton	TV movie
2011	Apocalypse According to Doris	Bauer	
2012	Hayabusa: Harukanaru Kikan	Dr. Daniel Clark	
2012	Celestial Guard	Torno	Short
2012	An Average American Marriage	Jerome	TV movie
2012	Potluck	Mike	TV movie
2013	Marriage of Inconvenience	Pastor	Short
2013	Foreclosed	Deputy Drews	Video
2013	Trane and Miles	John Coltrane	Short
2013	You & Me	Doctor	Short
2014	Bermuda Tentacles	Captain Phillips	TV movie
2014	Whipping Boy	Napalm's Father	Short
2014	The New Jersey Americans	Player Ricco	Short
2014	Hidden in the Woods	Ricco	
2015	Story of Eva	Detective Grind	
2015	A Gifted Amateur	Detective Savino	Short
2015	Batgirl Rises	The Riddler	Short
2015	Family Times	Jasmine's Dad	Short
2015	In Between the Gutter and the Stars	Tourist in Love	Short
2015	Stormageddon	Agent Travers	TV movie
2016	Opening Night	Mr. Robertson	
2016	A Husband for Christmas	Roger Burkett	TV movie
2016	The Hidden Toll	Community Director	Short
2017	Capture	Drew	Short
2017	Fat Camp	Fred	
2017	The Possessed	Louis Laveau	
2017	Bobbi Kristina	Uncle Ray	TV movie
2017	The Sandman	Detective Price	
2017	My Christmas Grandpa	Jim	Short
2018	Where Branches Break	Abraham	Short
2019	Night Walk	Saud	
2019	The Wrong Boy Next Door	Principal Perkins	TV movie
2019	A Brother's Honor	Sheppard Granger	
2019	The Shinjuku Five	Ronny Hayes	
2020	She's in Portland	Paul	
2020	TALIENS: Last Stand	Sergeant John Davis	Short
2020	A Christmas for Mary	David	TV movie
2021	Do Something	Detective Dillon	

=== Television ===
Year	Title	Role	Notes
1982	Hill Street Blues	Tyler Bragg	Recurring cast: season 2
1985	American Playhouse	Jackson	Episode: "Displaced Person"
1985	C.A.T.S. Eyes	Edsom	Episode: "Love Byte"
1988	The Play on One	Larry	Episode: "Airbase"
1988-89	Doctor Who	Ringmaster	Serial: "The Greatest Show in the Galaxy"
1989	The Bill	Maxi Silver	Episode: "Duty Elsewhere"
1989	CBS Summer Playhouse	Alvin	Episode: "American Nuclear"
1991	Sleepers	Karl Richfield	Recurring cast
1991	Murder Most Horrid	Gary	Episode: "Mrs Hat and Mrs Red"
1992	Jeeves and Wooster	Liftman Coneybear	Recurring cast: season 3
1992	The Tomorrow People	Sergeant Young	Serial: "The Origin Story"
1993	Westbeach	Greg Dacosta	Main cast
1993	Sitting Pretty	Cliff Monahann	Episode: "Wills of Fire"
1996	Gulliver's Travels	Brobdingnag Scientist	Episode: "Episode #1.1"
1996	Highlander: The Series	Kassim	Episode: "Promises"
1997	JAG	Secret Service #2	Episode: "Washington Holiday"
1997	Babylon 5	Captain Frank	Episode: "The Face of the Enemy"
1997	The Pretender	Larron	Episode: "Back from the Dead Again"
1997	The Practice	Reporter	Episode: "Reasonable Doubts" & "Hide and Seek"
1999	Beverly Hills, 90210	Miles Caufield	Episode: "Agony"
2000	Days of Our Lives	Reggie Morris	Episode: "Episode #1.8729"
2006	ER	Barnard	Episode: "Scoop and Run"
2012	Bite Me	Barnard	Main cast: season 2
2014	Caper	Psycho	Recurring cast
2014	Family Time	-	Episode: "Powering Down"
2014	Match	Detective Purcell	Episode: "Secret Lives"
2015	Escorts	Charles Stone Sr.	Recurring cast
2016	K.C. Undercover	Preacher	Episode: "The Love Jinx"
2019	No Good Nick	Walter Strickland	Episode: "The Pigeon Drop"
2020-22	P-Valley	Pastor R. J. Gilfield	Recurring cast: season 1, guest: season 2
2024–26	Beauty in Black	Horace	Main cast

=== Music video ===
Year	Title	Artist	Role
1985	Saving All My Love for You	Whitney Houston	Producer / Lover
