= Berserker (1987 film) =

1987 American slasher film by Jefferson Richard

- Theatrical release poster
- Directed by: Jefferson Richard
- Written by: Joseph Kaufman; Jefferson Richard
- Produced by: Jules Rivera
- Starring: Greg Dawson; Joseph Alan Johnson; Valerie Sheldon; Beth Toussaint; George "Buck" Flower
- Cinematography: Henning Schellerup
- Edited by: Marcus Manton
- Music by: Chuck Francour; Gary Griffin
- Distributed by: Shapiro Entertainment
- Release date: July 1987
- Running time: 85 minutes
- Country: United States
- Language: English

Berserker (also known as Berserker: The Nordic Curse) is a 1987 American slasher film written and directed by Jefferson Richard. The film centers on a group of campers who are stalked and murdered by a Viking berserker.

== Plot ==
At Rainbow Valley Campground, An elderly couple, Homer and Edna Roberts, clear their campsite and walk through the woods back to the administration building. By nightfall they are lost, and are savagely killed by a bear.

Six teenagers, Josh, Kristi, Shelly, Mike, Kathy, and Larry, decide to camp in Rainbow Valley. As they drive there, Larry reads from a history book about the area, revealing it was settled by Scandinavian descendants of the vikings. They are pulled over by Officer Hill for littering, as Josh had thrown a beer can out the window earlier. He lets them go with a warning, adding that there are wild animals in the campground they are visiting.

Arriving at the camp, they run into owner Pappy Nyquist, who is unfriendly to Josh despite having known him for years. As Josh starts arguing with Pappy, Mike steps in and manages to get the group the Miller campsite for the week.

Out of spite, Josh drives to the Sargent campsite, which Pappy said was still in use. Finding the Roberts’ tent, Josh folds it up and tosses it into the woods. At night, the group have a campfire, and Larry reads from the history book about Viking berserkers. He says that the spirits of the berserkers can possess a living descendant. Josh scares Kristi by grabbing her from behind with an old glove, which he found in the woods. Mike admonishes him for the prank, and tosses the glove away, a tag revealing it belongs to Homer Roberts.

Pappy and Officer Hill, revealed to be cousins, play chess. Hill expresses worry over the kids being in the wilderness with no one to guide them. He heads out to the further campsite, not knowing Josh drove to the closer one.

At the cabin, the teens turn in for the night. Josh waxes nostalgic about being at the campsite with his dad. The discussion turns dark, as there was an incident at the campsite six years ago: a little girl was found dead, with the rumor being she was killed by a bear. Josh’s father left the family shortly after.

Kristi leaves to use the bathroom. Officer Hill returns from the Miller campsite, finding it abandoned. Pappy tells him the teens are at the Sargent place, and offers to check on them. As Kristi has not returned, Mike and Shelly look for her. They find her in the woods, sending her back to the campsite, before sneaking off to have sex. As Mike and Shelly have sex, Kristi is attacked by the berserker. They find the Roberts’ bodies and become separated running back to camp.

Kristi and Shelly are both killed by the berserker, their bodies being discovered by the others. As Mike weeps over his girlfriend’s corpse, Josh says they have to go for help. They head back to the campsite, while Pappy drives over at the same time. The teens get lost in the fog, but eventually make their way towards the Miller campsite. Josh reveals that he parked at the Sargent place, and hid the Roberts’ tent.

The kids make their way through the woods, unknowingly being followed by a bear that has been in the area. They make it to the road, and see Pappy’s truck, but are unable to signal him. Pappy enters the kids’ cabin, but leaves upon finding it empty. Larry finds one of the berserker’s victims, and injures his leg trying to run away. He is too badly hurt to walk on it, and they lack materials for a stretcher, so they have to leave him. Mike realizes they are at the spot where he and Shelly had sex, so he knows the way back to the cabin. He and Kathy head for the cabin while Josh stays with Larry.

Mike and Kathy find Pappy’s truck parked at the cabin, but no sign of Pappy. They find a torn, bloody scrap of Pappy’s shirt nearby. They try starting the truck, but are unsuccessful, as Josh had accidentally run the battery down by playing the radio all day. Pappy’s truck doesn’t have the keys inside, so Mike takes the three-wheel ATV they brought with. Mike goes alone, telling Kathy to barricade herself inside the cabin.

Waiting with Larry, Josh is suddenly mauled by the berserker. The berserker closes in on Larry, but the bear shows up, and the berserker fights it. Larry cheers on the bear as it fights the berserker, eventually driving him off. Larry worries that the bear will attack him, but it wanders off instead. Mike races off to find Officer Hill.

In the morning, Larry makes a crutch to walk on, promising to come back for the surviving Josh. Mike flags down Officer Hill. In the cabin, someone tries to break through the barricade. Larry arrives, and he and his girlfriend Kathy reunite. Their celebration is cut short when they realize the berserker is nearby. Officer Hill arrives, and shoots the berserker. As the survivors leave, the berserker turns back to his human form: Pappy Nyquist, whose eyes suddenly open.

== Cast ==
- Greg Dawson as Josh Winter
- Joseph Alan Johnson as Mike Stone
- Rodney Montague as Larry Fishman
- Valerie Sheldon as Kathy
- Shannon Engemann as Kristi
- Beth Toussaint as Shelly
- Mike Riley as Berserker
- John F. Goff as Officer Walt Hill
- George "Buck" Flower as Pappy Nyquist
- Oscar Rowland as Homer Roberts
- Beverly Rowland as Edna Roberts

== Production ==
Parts of the film were shot at Big Cottonwood Canyon in Utah.

== Release ==
=== Home media ===
The film was released on DVD by Quantum Leap on October 22, 2001. It was later released by Hollywood DVD on August 2, 2004. Vinegar Syndrome released the film on Blu-ray in 2019.

== Reception ==
Andrew Smith from Popcorn Pictures awarded the film a score of 3/10, writing, Berserker sounded great and could have become a little slasher gem but the lack of the berserker on-screen is disappointing and ‘Gentle Ben’ the bear doesn’t have any need to be in here. One to avoid unless you have a burning desire to see every 80s slasher film". Todd Martin from HorrorNews.net offered the film similar criticism, calling it "a boring, confusing, hokey, mess of a film". Will and Roni agreed that the Viking angle was underplayed.
