= American Ninja 4: The Annihilation =

1990 film by Cedric Sundstrom

- Theatrical release poster
- Directed by: Cedric Sundstrom
- Written by: David Geeves
- Produced by: Ovidio G Assonitis
- Starring: Michael Dudikoff; David Bradley; James Booth; Dwayne Alexandre
- Music by: Nic. tenBroek
- Distributed by: Cannon Pictures; MGM/UA Home Video; Warner Home Video
- Release date: August 31, 1990 (South Africa)
- Running time: 99 minutes
- Countries: United States; Lesotho
- Language: English
- Box office: $358,047 (US)

American Ninja 4: The Annihilation is a 1990 American martial arts action film starring Michael Dudikoff, David Bradley, and James Booth. A sequel to American Ninja 3: Blood Hunt (1989), it is the fourth installment in the American Ninja franchise, followed by American Ninja V (1993) and was directed by Cedric Sundstrom. The film marked Michael Dudikoff's final appearance in the American Ninja franchise.

== Plot ==
British Colonel Scarf Mulgrew threatens to nuke New York City unless he is paid 50 million dollars. Agents Sean Davidson, Carl Brackston and Joe Armstrong, a former special forces commando now working as a teacher with the Peace Corps, team up to save the city. The action takes place in Lesotho, and includes a Middle Eastern sheikh who is training a team of ninjas in the countryside.

== Cast ==
- Michael Dudikoff as Agent Joe Armstrong
- David Bradley as Agent Sean Davidson
- Dwayne Alexandre as Agent Carl Brackston
- Robin Stille as Dr. Sarah
- Ken Gampu as Dr. Tamba
- James Booth as Colonel Scarf Mulgrew
- Ron Smerczak as Shiekh Ali Maksood
- Frantz Dobrowsky as Captain O'Reilly
- Kely McClung as Super Ninja
- Jody Abrahams as Pango
- Anthony Fridjhon as Freddie / Treddle
- David Sherwood as Gavin
- Sean Kelly as Norris
- Jamie Bartlett as Segal
- John Pasternak as Carlos
- Robin B. Smith as Schultz
- Montle Moorosi I as Axel
- Shane Safi as Little Special School Child
- Rev'd Fr. (Alan Edward) Clement Mullenger SSM Society of the Sacred Mission as Fr. Hallinger (vicar).

== Release ==
The film was released on South Africa on August 31, 1990 and on March 8, 1991 in the United States.

== Sequel ==
A sequel titled American Ninja V, was released in 1993.
