= Jennifer Nitsch =

German actress (1966–2004)

Jennifer Nitsch (Cologne, December 10, 1966 – Munich, June 13, 2004) was a German television actress.

Nitsch was the daughter of a manager and a housewife. Her parents divorced when she was two years old. She attended the Pädagogium Godesberg school with her brother. Thanks to her great-aunt, a costume mistress at the Cologne Opera, she was a passionate seamstress as a schoolgirl and trained as a costume designer after graduating from high school. As a costume designer's assistant at Westdeutscher Rundfunk, she experienced the filming of a television production and finally decided to become an actress. She trained in film and television at AC&C Studio in Munich, Zurich and New York City.

Nitsch first appeared on camera in small episodic roles in the television series Forsthaus Falkenau and Der Alte. She made her film debut in 1989 as Silke in Hans W. Geißendörfer's Bumerang-Bumerang (de). Her breakthrough as a film and television actress came in 1991 when she played Anette, a crafty female flatmate, in Sönke Wortmann's comedy film Allein unter Frauen (Alone Among Women).

From 1992 to 1993, she had a recurring role as Susanne Junginger in the medical and family series Freunde fürs Leben (Friends for Life). For her portrayal of the married designer Teresa Gärtner in the five-part ZDF series Nur eine kleine Affäre (Just a Little Affair), she was awarded the Bavarian TV Awards in 1994 and the Adolf Grimme Prize in 1995. She subsequently appeared in numerous other film and television productions. Nitsch loved to play emancipated, feisty women who steadfastly follow their own path. Director Dieter Wedel cast her as 'Barbara Sattler' alongside Mario Adorf, Stefan Kurt, Heiner Lauterbach and Maja Maranow in his five-part series Der Schattenmann (1996).
In 1999, she starred alongside Miroslav Nemec in the Christmas thriller Lieber böser Weihnachtsmann (Dear Bad Santa), directed by Ben Verbong.

In March 2002, Nitsch made her debut in the ARD crime series in the 494th Tatort episode Bienzle und der Tag der Rache (Bienzle and the Day of Vengeance) as the suspect Susanne Kuron. In the television comedy In der Höhle der Löwin (In the Lioness's Den), which premiered in June 2003, she played the dedicated surgeon Dr Maja von Wiesenthal alongside Rosemarie Fendel. In April 2004, she appeared alongside Francis Fulton-Smith in the leading role in the television film Geerbtes Glück (Inherited Happiness). Her last film role was the title role in Helmut Metzger's television production Judith Kemp, in which she played a courageous business lawyer in 2004. The successful debut film was to be followed by a television series, which could no longer be realised. Posthumously, Nitsch appeared in December 2004 as medical assistant Ellen Holm in the ZDF crime series Der letzte Zeuge (The Last Witness) in one episode alongside Ulrich Mühe.

Jennifer Nitsch died on 13 June 2004 at the age of 37 when she fell from her fourth-floor attic flat in the Schwabing district of Munich. As she suffered from depression, suicide is assumed, although an accident cannot be completely ruled out. According to the public prosecutor's office, she was heavily intoxicated with a blood alcohol level of 3.1 per mille and had also taken sleeping pills.

She was buried in Sankt Peter-Ording in the cemetery of the Protestant Church of St. Nikolai.

== Filmography ==
- 1989: Boomerang Boomerang, as Silke
- 1991: Alone Among Women, as Anette
- 1993: A Man for My Wife (TV film), as Martina
- 1993: Gefährliche Verbindung (TV film), as Regine
- 1994: Nur eine kleine Affäre (TV miniseries), as Teresa Gärtner
- 1994: International Zone (TV film), as Ina
- 1995–1996: Die Straßen von Berlin (TV series, 6 episodes), as Irene Starnow
- 1996: The Shadow Man (TV miniseries), as Barbara Sattler
- 1997: Life Penalty (TV film), as Katja
- 1998: L'elefante bianco (TV film), as Marianna
- 1998: Women Don't Lie, as Marie
- 1998: Caraibi (TV miniseries), as Isabella
- 1999: Men Are Like Chocolate (TV film), as Linda Lano
- 1999: Die letzte Chance (TV film), as Katharina
- 1999: Chain of Evidence (TV film), as Lisa
- 1999: Lieber böser Weihnachtsmann (TV film), as Kim Ziegler
- 2000: Death, Deceit and Destiny Aboard the Orient Express, as Rita Evans
- 2003: In the Lioness' Den (TV film), as Dr. Maja von Wiesenthal
- 2004: Pact with the Devil, as Bae
- 2004: Judith Kemp (TV film), as Judith Kemp
