= Die Straßen von Berlin =

- Starring: Martin Semmelrogge; Dietrich Mattausch; Ingo Naujoks; Jennifer Nitsch; Uwe Ochsenknecht; Hannes Jaenicke
- Country of origin: Germany

Die Straßen von Berlin (lit. 'The Streets of Berlin') is a German television series.

== See also ==
- List of German television series
