= Beth Toussaint =

American actress (born 1962)

- Born: Elizabeth Toussaint; September 25, 1962 (age 63); Pleasant Hill, California, U.S.
- Other name: Beth Toussaint Coleman
- Occupation: Actress
- Years active: 1987–2006
- Spouse: Jack Coleman (m. 1996)
- Children: 1
- Relatives: David Toussaint (brother)

Elizabeth Toussaint (born September 25, 1962) is an American former actress.

== Life and career ==
Before television roles, Toussaint worked as a model, and appeared in the 1984 music video for Bon Jovi's song "She Don't Know Me", Bob Seger's 1986 song "Like a Rock", and in the 1987 music video for SAGA's song "Only Time Will Tell". Additionally she appeared in the 1987 music video for the song "Big Mistake" by Peter Cetera.

From 1988 to 1989, she was a recurring cast member in the CBS primetime soap opera Dallas as Tracey Lawton, and from 1996 to 1997 in The WB primetime soap opera Savannah. Toussaint also appeared in Cheers, Star Trek: The Next Generation, Melrose Place, Matlock, Babylon 5, Martial Law and The Young and the Restless.

== Personal life ==
Toussaint is married to actor Jack Coleman. The couple has a daughter, born in 1999. Her parents are Leona and Maynard Toussaint, and she is the elder sister of writer David Toussaint.

== Filmography ==
Year	Title	Role	Notes
1987	Berserker	Shelly	film
1988	Dead Heat	Lab Technician	film
1988	Monsters	Lisa	Episode: "Sleeping Dragon"
1988–1989	Dallas	Tracey Lawton	Recurring role, seasons 12-13
1989	Growing Pains	Morgan Chase	Episode: "Coughing Boy"
1989	Booker	Jessica Barber	Episode: "Wheels and Deals – Part 1"
1990	Star Trek: The Next Generation	Ishara Yar	Episode: "Legacy"
1990	Matlock	Andrea Todd	Episode: "The Mother"
1990	MacGyver	Dawn Rigel	Episode: "The Visitor"
1991	21 Jump Street	Samantha Billings	Episode: "In the Name of Love"
1991	Cheers	Paula	Episode: "Rat Girl"
1991	Blackmail	Charlene	TV movie
1992	Nightmare Cafe	Angela	Episode: "Dying Well Is the Best Revenge"
1992	Mann & Machine	Anna Ruggiero	Episode: "Truth or Consequences"
1992	Danger Island	Karen	TV movie
1992	Lady Boss	Venus Maria	TV movie
1992	Matlock	Yolanda Bergstrom	Episode: "The Legacy"
1992	Melrose Place	Colleen Patterson	Episode: "Jake vs. Jake"
1993	The Commish	Karen Welsh	Episode: "The Heart Is a Lonely Sucker"
1994	Project Shadowchaser II	Laurie Webber	film
1994	Green Dolphin Beat	Nicole	TV movie
1994	Fortune Hunter	Maggie Ford	Episode: "Triple Cross"
1994	Babylon 5	Anna Sheridan	Episode: "Revelations"
1994	Breach of Conduct	Paula Waite	TV movie
1995	The Return of Hunter	Vicki Morgan Sherry	TV movie
1995	Marker	Risa	Episode: “Spanish Laughter”
1995	Legend	Beth McMillan	Episode: "Bone of Contention"
1996–1997	Savannah	Veronica Koslowski	Series regular
1997	Deadly Games	Belinda	Episode: "The Ex-Girlfriend"
1998	Martial Law	Gabriella Zane	Episode: "Dead Ringers"
1999	Any Day Now	Attorney	Episode: "I'm Not Emotional"
1999	Hijack	Valerie Miller	film
2000	Scream 3	Female Caller (voice)	film
2000	Fortress 2: Re-Entry	Karen Brennick	film
2005	Red Eye	Lydia Keefe	film
2006	The Young and the Restless	Hope Adams Wilson	Recurring role, 9 episodes
