= Ron Smerczak =

English-South African actor (1949–2019)

- Born: 3 July 1949; Windsor, Berkshire, England
- Died: 12 May 2019 (aged 69); Chicago, Illinois, U.S
- Citizenship: United Kingdom; South Africa
- Occupation: Actor
- Years active: 1972–2019

Ron Smerczak (3 July 1949 – 12 May 2019) was a British-South African actor who appeared in South African telenovelas and contributed to South African cinema.

== Early life ==
Smerczak was born on 3 July 1949 in the UK. Smerczak attended the National Youth Theatre of Great Britain from 1965 to 1970 and the Royal Academy of Dramatic Art London from 1969 to 1971. Thereafter, Smerczak completed his graduation from University of Cardiff.

== Acting career ==
Smerczak appeared several films including American Ninja 4: The Annihilation, Who Am I?, and Cyborg Cop.

== Partial filmography ==
- House of Whipcord (1974) – Ted
- One Away (1976) – Young Policeman at Roadblock
- Kill and Kill Again (1981) – Marduks guard (uncredited)
- Prisoners of the Lost Universe (1983) – Head Trader
- Torn Allegiance (1984) – Pte. Stan Archer
- Deadly Passion (1985) – Plainclothes Cop
- Shaka Zulu (1986, TV Mini-Series) – Ogle
- Master of Dragonard Hill (1987) – Sergeant
- Scavengers (1988) – Captain Barlow
- Return of the Family Man (1989) – The Family Man
- American Eagle (1989) – Edward Slovak
- Toxic Effect (1989) – Jonathan Forbes
- Burndown (1990) – Mason
- The Fourth Reich (1990) – General Karlowa
- American Ninja 4: The Annihilation (1990) – Maksood
- Oh Shucks! Here Comes UNTAG (1990) – Nigel Shady
- Incident at Victoria Falls (1992, TV Movie) – Lt. Grisholm
- Cyborg Cop (1993) – Callan
- Jock of the Bushveld (1994) – Seedling
- Freefall (1994) – John Horner
- Trigger Fast (1994) – Sgt. Tring
- The Mangler (1995) – Officer Steele
- Lunarcop (1995) – Aragon
- Cry, the Beloved Country (1995) – Captain van Jaarsveld
- Dangerous Ground (1997) – Interrogation Policeman
- Who Am I? (1998) – Morgan
- Beings (1998) – PC Jim Blythe
- Operation Delta Force 3: Clear Target (1998) – Professor Johnson
- Traitor's Heart (1999) – Senator John Mahoney
- Kin (2000) – Hans
- Operation Delta Force 5: Random Fire (2000) – General Thompson
- The Little Unicorn (2001) – Sam the Vet
- Witness to a Kill (2001) – Gunther
- Glory Glory (2002) – Packer
- Pets (2002) – Sonny
- Stander (2003) – Wild Coast Cop
- Dead Easy (2004) – Bud Klein
- Beauty and the Beast (2005) – Ragnar
- Straight Outta Benoni (2005) – Priest
- The Secret of Terror Castle (2009) – Worthington
- Finding Lenny (2009) – Arthur Jackson
- Amelia (2009) – Reporter #3
- The Algiers Murders (2013) – Detective Don Bastick
- Cry of Love (2016) – Ben
- Harry's Game (2017) – Detective Don
