= Frank Zagarino =

American actor

- Occupations: Actor, producer, director, personal trainer

Frank Zagarino is an American personal trainer and former actor, who starred in a number of low budget action movies.

One of his early roles was in the movie Barbarian Queen (1985) in which he played opposite Lana Clarkson. Like several other American B movie stars he made many of his movies in Europe, especially in Italy. He starred in Ten Zan: The Ultimate Mission (1988) an Italian production filmed in North Korea, one of few foreign films filmed in that country (according to director Ferdinando Baldi, Zagarino was jailed for two days in North Korea because the Koreans suspected he was an American spy because he liked taking photos). He later appeared in American movies such as Project Shadowchaser (1992) and its three sequels, and Operation Delta Force (1997). He also appeared in the computer game Command & Conquer: Tiberian Sun (1999) as Nod Commander Anton Slavik.

He has also produced a number of films and directed three.

== Selected filmography ==
- 1985 Barbarian Queen
- 1988 Striker
- 1988 Ten Zan: The Ultimate Mission
- 1989 Cyborg - Il guerriero d'acciaio
- 1992 Project Shadowchaser
- 1994 Project Shadowchaser II
- 1995 Without Mercy
- 1995 Project Shadowchaser III
- 1995 Cyborg Cop III
- 1996 Project Shadowchaser IV
- 1997 Operation Delta Force (TV film)
- 1998 Armstrong (TV film)
