= Dangerous Ground (1997 film) =

- Theatrical release poster
- Directed by: Darrell Roodt
- Written by: Greg Latter; Darrell Roodt
- Produced by: Gillian Gorfil; Darrell Roodt
- Starring: Ice Cube; Elizabeth Hurley; Ving Rhames
- Cinematography: Paul Gilpin
- Edited by: David Heitner
- Music by: Stanley Clarke
- Production companies: Ghettobird Productions; Cube Vision Productions
- Distributed by: New Line Cinema
- Release date: February 12, 1997
- Running time: 95 minutes
- Country: United States
- Language: English
- Budget: $28 million
- Box office: $5.4 million

Dangerous Ground is a 1997 American action thriller film starring Ice Cube and Elizabeth Hurley, directed by Darrell Roodt and written by Greg Latter and Roodt.

== Plot ==
In 1983 South Africa, a young Vusi organizes a radical student protest that is soon put down by police, Vusi is captured and forced to leave for the United States where he settles down in the San Francisco Bay Area.

Fourteen years later, Vusi returns to South Africa to attend his father's funeral at the village he grew up in. He is unable to bring himself to slaughter a cow as part of the funeral ritual. Vusi's younger brother Ernest, a former soldier, constantly berates him for his choice to run away to U.S. instead of taking part in "the struggle". This angers Vusi, who tells Ernest: "I was in the struggle while you were still pissing in your pants." While talking with his mother, Vusi wonders why his youngest brother Steven was not at the funeral. His mother admits that they have not seen Steven in a while. She provides Vusi with two addresses and sends him out to find Steven.

The first address Vusi checks is Steven's apartment in Johannesburg, where he meets his brother's neighbor Karen. He gives her his contact information, in case she hears any information. After checking the second address, Vusi starts driving out of Soweto. He is confronted by three armed criminals who steal his car, jacket, and shirt. The gunmen also break his father's spear, a family heirloom. Vusi returns to his hotel and calls his fiancée to tell her what has happened to him. He receives a note from Karen telling him to meet her at The Summit Club.

At the club, Vusi discovers Karen's occupation as a stripper. She reports hearing noises, coming from Steven's apartment. After the show, the pair returns to the apartment complex and agrees to check the room. Karen climbs along the outside of the building to Steven's open window, where a bandit attacks her. The ruffian flees, knocking over Vusi in his escape. The encounter causes Vusi to wonder what is actually going on with Steven. Karen finally confesses that Steven had borrowed cocaine on "credit" from a drug dealer named Muki. Steven was initially planning to sell the drug and make enough money for Karen and him to travel to the United States and visit Vusi. Steven instead took the money and drugs for himself.

With the truth revealed, Karen suggests they check out the local clubs to see if they can find any leads. At a hard-rock club Vusi finds out about Karen's crack cocaine addiction, after watching her take a hit from a pipe. He confronts her about it, and suspects she was the one who got Steven hooked on the drug. The duo are accosted by white supremacist punks outside the club. Two of them pin Vusi to a wall at gunpoint, while the leader of the gang strikes Karen for associating with a "kaffir". Vusi manages to get the upper hand on the punks, while Karen grabs the gun and hands it over to Vusi. Vusi holds the leader of the team at gunpoint, before knocking him out and pistol-whipping the other roughneck. Back at the apartment, Karen asks Vusi to visit her drug dealer and purchase a gram of crack for her, or she will not tell him anything else about Steven. Vusi reluctantly accepts her terms.

Karen's drug dealer, Sam, is initially suspicious of Vusi. He becomes relaxed when Vusi reveals that he knows Karen. Sam tells Vusi that Muki will not allow him to sell to Karen. Muki reportedly suspects that Karen and Steven may be working together to hide the money. Sam charges an extra 50 dollars and tells Vusi to stay in the apartment. Vusi answers the door to find Steven, who flees from him down an alley. Vusi returns to the apartment, where he is confronted by a switchblade-wielding Sam. Sam demands to know why he left. Vusi pulls a gun and forces Sam over to the window, interrogating him on the whereabouts of Muki. Sam replies "you don't find Muki, Muki finds you." Sam returns the money to Vusi, along with the drugs Karen asked for.

Vusi heads back to Karen's place. Karen learns that Vusi revealed his status as Steven's brother to Sam. She figures that Muki will find out about the connection and becomes paranoid. They leave her apartment and head towards Vusi's hotel room. The next morning, Vusi drops Karen back at her apartment. He is then confronted by one of Muki's men in his car, which is stopped by more of Muki's collaborators, and Vusi is captured. He is placed in the trunk of another car. Vuki is transported to a soccer stadium, where Muki is waiting to meet him. Muki tells Vusi about his brother's massive debt of 45,000 rand. He threatens to have the entire Madlazi family killed to settle the debt. But he will agree to spare Steven's life and leave them alone, if Vusi is able to bring him 15,000 U.S. dollars in two days.

Karen tells Vusi that Steven headed for Sun City, in order to gamble back the money he needs to pay back the debt. The pair head out for the casino. They drive through an Afrikaner Weerstandsbeweging (AWB, Afrikaner Resistance Movement) rally and then arrive at the casino. Karen and Vusi split up to search the casino. While playing on a slot machine, Karen is approached by Steven who immediately asks her for some cocaine. Karen informs him that his father has died, information which saddens Steven. Steven tells her that he only managed to make back 2,000 of the 45,000 rand which he owes to Muki, but that he still has 5 grams of Muki's product stashed away. Karen heads up to Steven's room with him. Steven shoots over half a gram of crack into his arm. An arriving Vusi locates Steven and becomes outraged at Karen, for allowing his brother to become an addict. He calms down and the trio leaves the casino.

Vusi is only able to get 14,100 dollars to pay back Muki. The trio heads off to the hotel to pay off the debt. Steven yells at Muki for trashing his apartment, but is told to be quiet by Vusi. Muki is pleased with the money Vusi was able to bring him. Vusi promises to pay him the rest of the money by the next day. Muki tells Steven that the word is out that anyone can mess with Muki, and that he must send a message despite their deal. Muki then shoots Steven with Vusi's gun, which had been confiscated on the way in earlier. A man in the apartment, who is revealed to be a detective sergeant, is disgusted at Muki's actions. While Steven's body is moved out, Muki takes a large hit from a bong. He had offered the bong to Steven before fatally shooting him.

Steven's corpse is brought back to the village for burial. There, Vusi recruits Ernest to help him take revenge on Muki. While in the village, Vusi's spear is repaired. Vusi is finally able to slaughter a goat, as part of Steven's funeral. Ernest leads Vusi and Karen to a weapons' cache he had buried. With the weapons needed to take their revenge, the trio goes back to Sam's apartment. Under threat of torture, they convince Sam to help them by carrying in a bomb that Ernest had put in a present box.

At Muki's place, Sam attempts to warn Muki's men of the bomb in the box. The bomb explodes, killing Sam and the two men guarding the door. Vusi and Ernest move through the apartment, killing Muki's henchmen. Vusi is almost shot by Muki's wife in a hot tub, but is able to see her drawing a gun and kills her first. Ernest checks a back room only to be jumped by the drug-crazed Muki before reacting. Muki holds him hostage, in order to get Vusi to drop his weapons. Vusi drops his gun and sees Karen sneaking up behind Muki. She lets off a burst by her rifle into the ceiling, giving Vusi an opportunity to approach Muki and stab him with his father's spear. Muki is stabbed three times in the stomach, and falls out of a window and onto the roof of a car below. The trio flee the building as police show up to investigate the crime scene.

In the final scene, Vusi convinces his fiancée to come to South Africa and settle in his village. She agrees to be on a plane heading there as soon as possible. Karen considers checking into a drug rehabilitation facility to seek treatment for her addiction. Vusi instead suggests that she should come live with them, in order to get some fresh air away from Johannesburg.

== Cast ==
- Ice Cube as Vusi Madlazi
- Elizabeth Hurley as Karen
- Ving Rhames as Muki
- Ron Smerczak as Interrogation police officer
- Sechaba Morojele as Ernest Madlazi
- Eric Miyeni as Steven Madlazi
- Greg Latter as Sam
- Thokozani Nkosi as Young Vusi
- Robin B. Smith as Iron Guard
- Prophets of Da City as group in nightclub

== Reception ==
The film holds an 8% rating from Rotten Tomatoes, based on 13 reviews.

The New York Times reviewer Stephen Holden wrote, "Dangerous Ground is too exploitative and finally too unconvincing to be trusted on any level."

== Soundtrack ==
A soundtrack containing hip hop music was released on February 11, 1997, by Jive Records. It peaked at number 20 on the Billboard 200 and number 3 on the Top R&B/Hip-Hop Albums.
