= Project Shadowchaser III =

- Directed by: John Eyres
- Written by: Nick Davis
- Produced by: Shari Lane Bowles (producer); Danny Dimbort (executive producer); John Eyres (producer); Paul Eyres (producer); Avi Lerner (executive producer); Trevor Short (executive producer); Gregory Vanger (producer)
- Starring: Sam Bottoms; Musetta Vander; Christopher Atkins; Frank Zagarino
- Cinematography: Mark Morris
- Edited by: Amanda I. Kirpaul
- Music by: Stephen Edwards
- Distributed by: Nu Image
- Release date: November 21, 1995
- Running time: 99 minutes
- Country: United States
- Language: English

Project Shadowchaser III, also known as Shadowchaser III, Project Shadowchaser 3000 and Edge Of Darkness, is a 1995 American direct-to-video science fiction film by director John Eyres. It is the third installment in the Project Shadowchaser film series.

== Premise ==
The third chapter in this science fiction series finds a space station in dire trouble after colliding with an old mining vessel that has been deserted...except for one murderous android!

== Cast ==
- Sam Bottoms as Kody
- Musetta Vander as Rea
- Christopher Atkins as Snake
- Frank Zagarino as Android
- Christopher Neame as Renko
- Ricco Ross as Lennox
- Aubrey Morris as Professor
- Robina Alston as Dee
- Bill Kirchenbauer as Wheels
- Mark Phelan as Mac
- Andrew Lamond as Daniel Peterson
- Kelly Hunt as Tanya Deal
- Scott Williams as Yuri Pastov
- Elizabeth Giordano as Tatiana
- Raymond Lynch as Yakav
- Red Horton as Man #1

== Release ==
=== Home media ===
The film was released on DVD in 2007 by Image Entertainment as a double feature with Project Shadowchaser II.

== Sequel ==
A sequel titled Project Shadowchaser IV was released in 1996.

== See also ==
- Project Shadowchaser
- Project Shadowchaser II
- Project Shadowchaser IV
