= Cyborg Cop =

- Promotional release poster
- Directed by: Sam Firstenberg
- Written by: Greg Latter
- Produced by: Danny Lerner
- Starring: David Bradley; John Rhys-Davies; Todd Jensen; Alonna Shaw; Ron Smerczak
- Edited by: Alan Pattillo
- Production company: Millennium Films
- Distributed by: Vidmark Entertainment
- Release date: 1993
- Running time: 95 minutes
- Country: United States
- Language: English

Cyborg Cop is a 1993 American direct-to-video science-fiction action film starring David Bradley, John Rhys-Davies, Todd Jensen, Alonna Shaw, and Rufus Swart as the Cyborg. It was directed by Sam Firstenberg and written by Greg Latter. It is the first installment in the Cyborg Cop film series. The film has two sequels, Cyborg Cop II and Cyborg Cop III. The latter was released in 1995 as Terminal Impact.

== Plot ==
Ex-DEA officer Jack Ryan has quit his job following a terrible shoot-out. Jack Ryan receives a message for help from his brother Phillip, who had been employed for a dangerous military mission in the Caribbean. Jack Ryan is unaware that his brother is being used for an unprecedented scientific experiment: Professor Joachim Kessel has developed a technique to turn any soldier into a Cyborg - a half-human, half-robot creature - virtually indestructible. Thanks to his army of Cyborgs, Kessel wants to take over the Caribbean, and Jack Ryan will become a kind of "Cop of the Cyborgs" to stop the man.

== Cast ==
- David Bradley as DEA Agent Jack Ryan
- Todd Jensen as Phillip Ryan
- John Rhys-Davies as Professor Joachim Kessel
- Alonna Shaw as Cathy
- Ron Smerczak as Callan
- Rufus Swart as Cyborg
- Anthony Fridjon as Hogan
- Shalom Kenan as Steve
- Robert Whitehead as Dr. Stechman
- Steven Leader as Frankie
- Robert Reynolds as Johnson
- Ernest Ndlovu as Sergeant

== Release ==
=== Theatrical ===
In the Philippines, the film was theatrically released by Solar Films as Universal Warrior on August 26, 1993.

=== Home media ===
Cyborg Cop was released direct-to-video in the United States in 1994.

== Reception ==
Critical reception was generally, although not universally, poor. Halliwell's Film Guide, for example, described it as "dim standard robot action fodder" with a "violent, cliché-ridden plot".

== Sequel ==
A sequel titled Cyborg Cop II was released in 1994.
