= American Ninja 3: Blood Hunt =

1989 film by Cedric Sundstrom

- Theatrical release poster
- Directed by: Cedric Sundstrom
- Screenplay by: Cedric Sundstorm
- Story by: Gary Conway
- Produced by: Harry Alan Towers
- Starring: Steve James; Michele Chan; Calvin Jung; Marjoe Gortner; David Bradley
- Cinematography: George Bartels
- Edited by: Michael J. Duthie; Bernard Weiser
- Music by: George S. Clinton
- Production company: Breton Film Productions Ltd.
- Distributed by: Cannon International
- Release date: February 24, 1989 (Los Angeles)
- Running time: 89 minutes
- Country: United States
- Language: English
- Box office: $902,152

American Ninja 3: Blood Hunt is a 1989 American martial arts action film directed by Cedric Sundstrom and starring David Bradley. It is based on a story by Gary Conway. A sequel to American Ninja 2: The Confrontation (1987), it is the third installment in the American Ninja franchise, followed by American Ninja 4: The Annihilation (1991).

== Plot ==
A powerful terrorist known as "The Cobra", has infected Sean Davidson, the American Ninja, with a deadly virus. He uses Sean as a test subject in his biological warfare experiments. Sean and his partners Curtis Jackson and Dexter have no choice but to fight The Cobra and his army of genetically-engineered ninja clones led by the female ninja Chan Lee.

== Cast ==
- David Bradley as Sean Davidson
  - Stephen Webber as Young Sean Davidson
- Steve James as Sergeant Curtis Jackson
- Marjoe Gortner as "The Cobra"
- Michele B. Chan as Chan Lee
- Yehuda Efroni as General Andreas
- Calvin Jung as Izumo
- Evan J. Klisser as Dexter
- Grant Preston as Minister of Interior
- Mike Huff as Dr. Holger
- Alan Swerdlow as Police Captain
- Thapelo Mofokeng as Police Sergeant
- Eckard Rabe as Sean's Father
- John Barrett as Joe Simpson (uncredited)
- Mike Stone as Tournament Arbiter (uncredited)

== Production ==
The film, shot in South Africa (not mentioned on the credits), was the first in the American Ninja series to feature a lead actor other than Michael Dudikoff (playing Joe Armstrong in the first two American Ninja movies as well as in American Ninja 4: The Annihilation together with David Bradley's character Sean Davidson); Bradley was cast after Kurt McKinney turned down the offer.

== Release ==
=== Home media ===
American Ninja 3: Blood Hunt was released on home video in the United Kingdom by Pathé in September 1989.

== Reception ==
=== Critical response ===
It was received poorly by critics. "Cart." of Variety described the film as a "cheap-looking pic" and "Even for this level of by-the-numbers action filmmaking, Cedric Sundtrom script is incredibly lame and his staging of chop-socky violence is little better." David Nusair of Reel Film Reviews gave it 1.5 out of 4 and called it "An obvious low point for the American Ninja movies"

== Sequel ==
A sequel titled American Ninja 4: The Annihilation, was released in 1990.
