= Mark Roper =

South African writer and film director (born 1958)

- Born: 16 March 1958 (age 68); Johannesburg, South Africa
- Occupation: Film director
- Years active: 1984–present
- Notable work: Project Shadowchaser IV; Death, Deceit and Destiny Aboard the Orient Express

Mark Roper (born 16 March 1958) is a South African writer and film director. He worked mainly as assistant director on more than forty films since 1984.

== Selected filmography ==
- Project Shadowchaser IV (1996)
- Death, Deceit and Destiny Aboard the Orient Express (2000)
- High Adventure (2001)
- The Sea Wolf (2001, also released as SeaWolf: The Pirate's Curse)
- Marines (2003)
