= Methodemic =

British heavy metal band

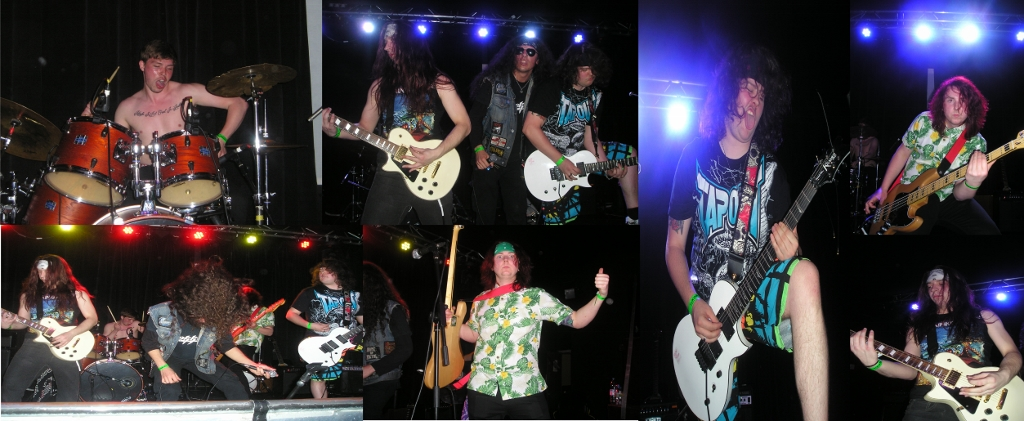

Background information
- Origin: Birmingham, England
- Genres: Heavy metal, Speed metal, Power metal, Progressive metal, Hard rock
- Years active: 2013–2016, 2022–present
- Members: Declan Moore; Andy Dyer Jr; Andy Morris; Kyle Moore
- Past members: Reece Lloyd; Daniel Riley; Emily Levy; Nathanial Hellier-Allport; Mitch Jay Barlow
- Website: www.methodemic.co.uk

Methodemic, previously known as Sweet Murder, are a British heavy metal band formed in Birmingham in 2013. The band released their debut EP, Aftermath, in October 2013. In 2014, singer Andy Dyer left the band and was replaced by Emily Levy. The band disbanded in 2016 and, after a failed reunion attempt in 2017, reformed with the original lead singer in 2022.

== History ==
=== Formation and debut EP (2013) ===
The band was founded in May 2013 by Andy Dyer, Reece Lloyd, and Declan Moore shortly after Dyer's and Lloyd's former band, Exide, dissolved. Former Exide manager Andy "Bear" Warner initially conceived of the band as a reformation of Exide. However, after auditions were held, Declan Moore joined as a second guitarist. The band's name is an alteration of the last track of Black Sabbath's album 13, Methademic.

By August 2013, bassist Andy "Butter" Morris and drummer Nathan Hellier-Allport had joined the band to complete the lineup. The band recorded their debut EP, Aftermath, in September 2013 and released it on 10 October 2013. The band promoted its release with an official launch party at the 02 Academy in Birmingham on 10 October 2013.

=== Second EP and breakup 2014–2016 ===
In 2014, the band began work on their debut album, initially titled Liberty Or Death, scheduled to release in later that year. In January 2014, guitarist Reece Lloyd left over "musical and personal differences". The band intended to continue as a four-piece band. On 4 May 2014, the band announced that Daniel Riley would join the band as their new rhythm guitarist. After three weeks, the band separated from Daniel Riley and would not provide further details.

On 1 July 2014, the band publicized that the successor to Aftermath was close to completion and the recording planned for November. They also revealed that a metal adaptation of a pop song would be featured on the album. On 1 November 2014, two days before the planned studio session, Dyer quit the band. On 30 November 2014, Emily Levy filled the lead singer role. In 2015, the band released a self-titled four track EP. The band opened for the Norwegian metal band Hydra on their Northern Symphony festival pre-show in Dudley.

=== Attempted reunions 2016–2017 ===
After the original band ended, Moore and Dyer reconciled and discussed reuniting Methodemic under the new name Sweet Murder. They planned to perform Methodemic songs and release new material. However, they settled on forming a new band called Rumrunner. The band disbanded in early 2018.

=== Reunion 2022–present ===
In April 2022, Spanish DJ Luis Celaa interviewed Andy Dyer on Radio Pacifikaos. When asked about his future musical plans, Dyer expressed his enthusiasm to reunite Methodemic, but had no definitive plans. In September 2022, the band reunited at the suggestion of Andy Morris with Kyle Moore, the younger brother of Declan Moore, as their drummer. The band's first performance since reforming was on 4 August 2023 at the Tamworth Cavern in Staffordshire. They opened for local Tamworth band Chemikill. The band resumed studio sessions in August 2023. Their EP Metamorphosis is forthcoming in early 2024.

== Musical style ==
The band's music has been described as a mix of traditional heavy metal, speed metal, power metal and hard rock. Fans dub the style "dog metal" because the band's sound is a mixed breed of many heavy metal styles and subgenres.

== Gallery ==
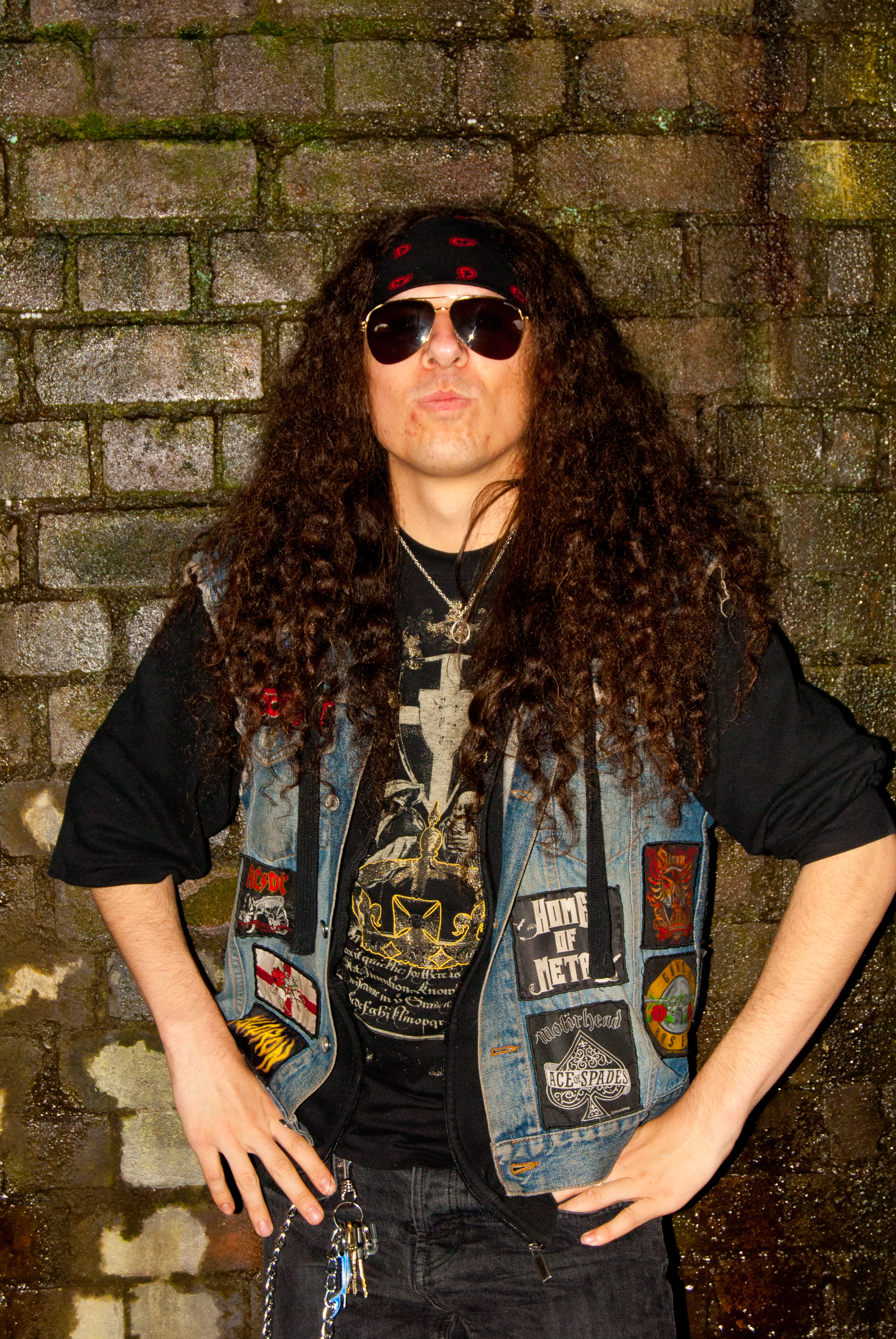
The band's founder Andy Dyer Jr

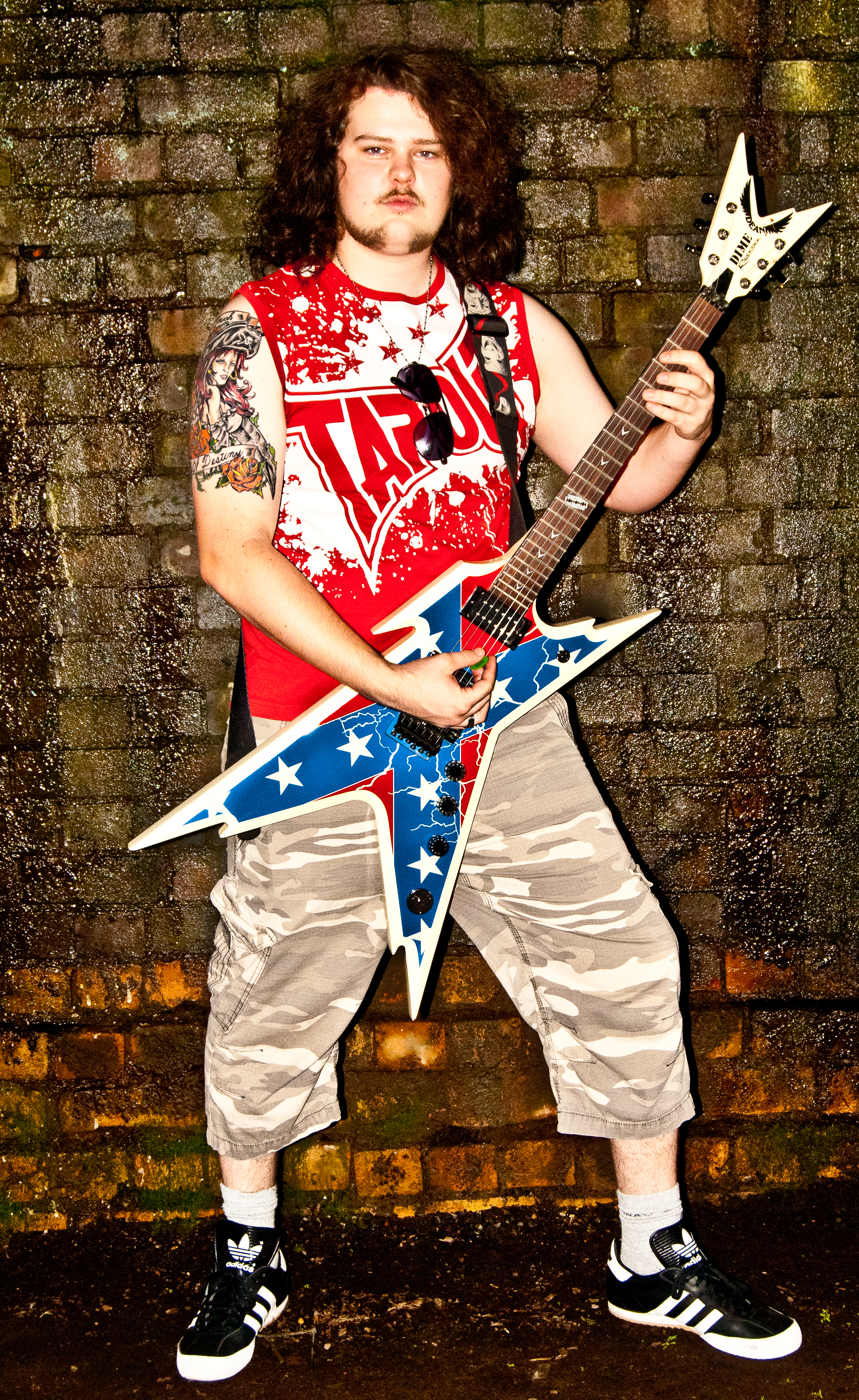
Co-founder Declan Moore

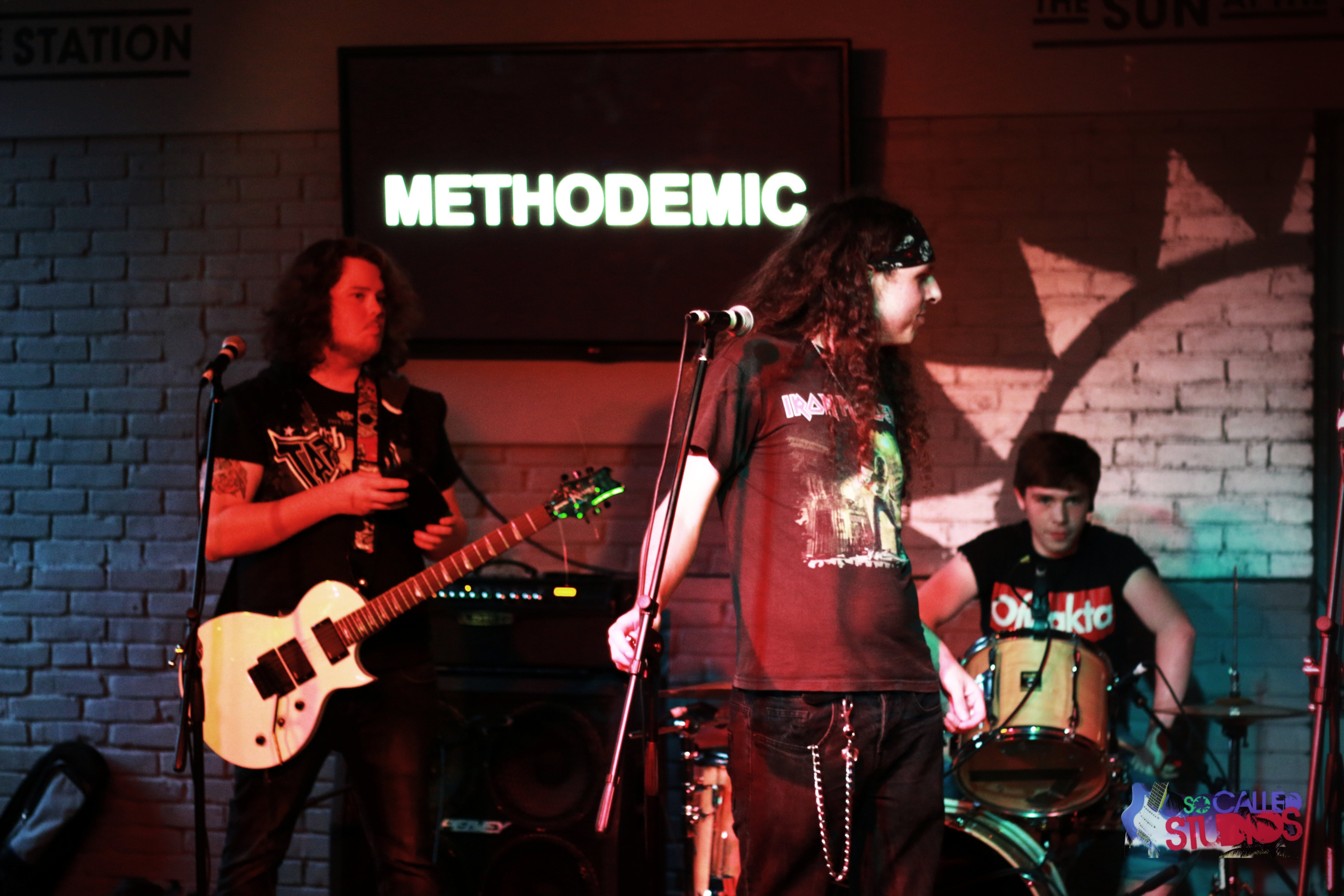
Moore, Dyer and Hellier-Allport on stage in 2014

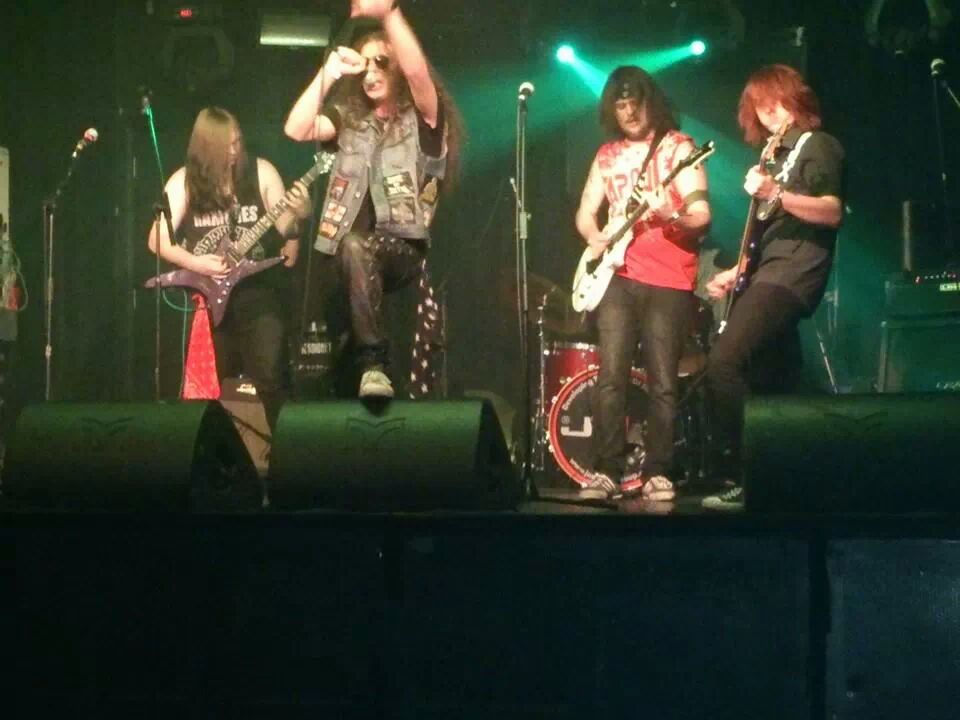
The original line-up at the 02 Academy 2 Birmingham in 2013

== Members ==
- Declan Moore – lead guitar, rhythm guitar, backing vocals (May 2013 – March 2016, September 2022 – present)
- Andy "Butter" Morris – bass guitar, keyboards, synths, backing vocals (August 2013 – March 2016, September 2022 – present)
- Andy Dyer Jr – lead vocals, backing vocals (May 2013 – November 2014, September 2022 – present)
- Kyle Moore – drums, percussion, backing vocals (September 2022 – present)

=== Former members ===
- Nathanial Hellier-Allport – drums, percussion, backing vocals (July 2013 – January 2016)
- Emily Levy – lead vocals, backing vocals (December 2014 – February 2016)
- Reece Lloyd – rhythm guitar, acoustic guitar (May 2013 – January 2014)
- Daniel Riley – rhythm guitar, acoustic guitar, backing vocals (May–June 2014)
- Mitch Jay Barlow – drums, percussion (December 2015 – March 2016)

== Discography ==
- Aftermath (2013)
- Methodemic (2015)
- Metamorphosis (2024)
