= Gay Financial Network =

The Gay Financial Network (GFN), a print and digital publication, was established in April 1998 or 1999 by Walter Schubert, Jr., founder and CEO of The Schubert Group LLC, and the first openly gay member of the New York Stock Exchange. In 2007, Schubert launched an online version of GFN.

GFN aimed to highlight gay-owned and gay-managed business and to alert readers about businesses that practiced discrimination on the basis of sexual orientation. Schubert, GFN's publisher, was a founding board member of the National Gay and Lesbian Chamber of Commerce.

GFN was the first gay-specific company to be advertised in The Wall Street Journal, on February 18, 2000. Some have viewed GFN as an example of merging gay activism and gay marketing.
