= Project Shadowchaser =

- Official DVD cover
- Directed by: John Eyres
- Written by: Stephen Lister
- Produced by: Geoff Griffiths and John Eyres
- Starring: Frank Zagarino; Martin Kove; Meg Foster; Paul Koslo; Joss Ackland; Ricco Ross
- Cinematography: Alan M. Trow
- Edited by: Delhak Wreen
- Music by: Gary Pinder
- Distributed by: EGM
- Release date: July 2, 1992
- Running time: 97 minutes
- Country: United States
- Language: English

Project Shadowchaser, also known as Shadowchaser and Project: Shadowchaser, is a 1992 American direct-to-video science fiction film by director John Eyres. It is the first installment in the Project Shadowchaser film series.

== Plot ==
Armed terrorists, led by a super android named Romulus (Frank Zagarino), take over a high rise hospital with the president's daughter Sarah (Meg Foster) as hostage. The android has been corrupted by its government creator Kinderman (Joss Ackland).

The FBI, led by Trevanian (Paul Koslo), gets the hospital architect, Desilva (Martin Kove), out of cryogenic prison and desperately asks for his help.

Desilva has a criminal past, but is thought the only person who can find a way to design a surprise raid. However, a mistake is made and, instead of the architect, an ex-pro football player, serving "cryo-time" for murder, is revived. The football player pretends to be Dixon (the architect) to stay out of prison; however, when the FBI's plan goes wrong, Desilva must face the android alone.

== Cast ==
- Frank Zagarino as Romulus
- Meg Foster as Sarah
- Joss Ackland as Kinderman
- Paul Koslo as FBI Special Agent Trevanian
- Martin Kove as Desilva

== Production ==
Project Shadowchaser was shot at Pinewood Studios. Most of the set was reused from Alien 3.

The special effects supervisor on the film was Brian Smithies.

Cinematographer Alan Trow had worked with director Richard Driscoll on an earlier film low budget film The Comic (1985). Work on that film led to a partnership with producer/director John Eyres on this and other action films.

=== Notability ===
The film was notable by the reunion of Martin Kove and Meg Foster, who previously worked together on the first season of Cagney & Lacey as Detectives Victor Isbecki and Christine Cagney, respectively, until Foster was replaced by Sharon Gless for the remainder of the series.

== Release ==
=== Home media ===
The film was released on videocassette in the summer of 1992 by Prism Pictures. Prior to August 4, 2015, the film had never been released onto region 1 DVD, until Echo Bridge Home Entertainment acquired the rights and released it through the Termination Collection, bundled with 4 additional movies as well. It had also popped up through AT&T U-Verse's screen pack, also under license from Echo Bridge.

== Reception ==
=== Critical response ===
Creature Feature gave the movie 3.5 out of 5 stars, praising the script as well as finding the action rousing. It also stated that this was better than many of its bigger budget counterpart. Moira, however, gave the movie one out of five stars, finding it "amazingly silly." TV Guide gave the movie one star, although it did like the twist ending revealing the terrorist true motives. The work of the director was found to be impressive but marred by unrealistic miniature effects

== Sequel ==
A sequel titled Project Shadowchaser II was released in 1994.

== See also ==
- Project Shadowchaser II
- Project Shadowchaser III
- Project Shadowchaser IV
