= Robin B. Smith =

South African actor

Personal information
- Born: 28 February 1955 (age 71) Cape Town, South Africa

Professional wrestling career
- Ring name: The Commandant
- Debut: 1997
- Retired: 1997

Robin Beauclerk Smith (born 28 February 1955) is a South African actor whose professional career began in theater whilst still in high school in 1970. He attended the University of Cape Town Drama School after school and worked at The Space Theater in Cape Town doing Socio Political shows during apartheid. He moved to Johannesburg in 1979 to continue his career in theatre, and to get into television, which was based there. He broke into movies during the heyday of the B grade action movies in the 1980s, and was for a short time in 1997, a wrestling manager for the then WWF now WWE. He was known in the World Wrestling Federation as The Commandant, who managed the South African Truth Commission for 9 months in 1997.

Born in South Africa, he is a film and stage actor, as well as a voice artist. He appeared in many South African and international movies throughout the 1980s and 1990s and is still working as an actor, voice artist and director, based in Cape Town South Africa.

== Career ==
=== Professional wrestling ===
Smith became a professional wrestling manager in early 1997. Bret Hart visited South Africa and met Smith. Hart recommended him for a role as a manager in the World Wrestling Federation (WWF), however he never fought as a wrestler. Smith made his wrestling debut in Tennessee in the United States Wrestling Association (USWA). He managed under the name Commandant, and managed a stable of paramilitary wrestlers including "Interrogator", "Tank" and "Recon" as the "Truth Commission"; a take on the similarly named Truth and Reconciliation Commission in South Africa.

This team won the USWA Tag Team Championship three times. In June 1997, the Truth Commission made their WWF debut. Smith made promos on WWF about the Truth Commission and attacking the United States for not having discipline. He was hated by the fans. "Sniper" replaced "Tank" on the commission. He was interviewed by Sunny, but scared her by yelling at her. During the summer of 1997 the group lost only to The Legion of Doom. In September, Smith was replaced by The Jackyl; the reason for Smith's departure was because Smith wasn't trained to wrestle and the WWF needed a manager who could take bumps and take part in the matches. Smith returned to South Africa, ending his wrestling career.

=== Acting ===
Robin Smith first appeared professionally in 1970 in the theater production "Hadrian V11" whilst still at high school in Cape Town South Africa. Two more professional appearances onstage before leaving school led to him attending the University of Cape Town Drama school after completing his schooling at St. Georges Grammar School. Two and a half years into the 3-year course, he left Drama School to work at the Space Theater in Cape Town, founded by the author Athol Fugard, actress Yvonne Bryceland, and her photographer husband Brian Asbury to raise public awareness during the dark years of Apartheid. He moved to Johannesburg in 1979 to continue his career in the theater and to try to break into TV, which only first came to South Africa in 1976. He has appeared in more than 100 feature films and TV shows to date, is an accomplished stage performer and a prolific voice artist. He returned to Cape Town, his home town, in 2006, and continues to work in film, TV and theater.

== Selected filmography ==
- Die Troudag van Tant Ralie (1975) - Darts player (uncredited)
- My Country My Hat (1983) - Policeman
- Torn Allegiance (1984) - Willits
- Deadly Passion (1985) - Hank the Bouncer
- The Hidden Farms (1985, Short) - Koos de Wet
- Vyfster: Die Slot (1986) - Gabba
- n Wêreld Sonder Grense (1987) - Phil
- Scavengers (1987) - Patrick
- Red Scorpion (1987) - Russian Officer
- Blind Justice (1988) - Max
- Paradise Road (1988) - Langert
- Diamond in the Rough (1988) - Connors' Superior
- The Schoolmaster (1988)
- Merchants of War (1989) - Harry Gere
- Brutal Glory (1989) - Bus Driver
- Jobman (1989) - Cop #2
- Screen Two (1989, TV Series) - Charlie Clarke
- Accidents (1989) - Raymond Oscar
- Death Force (1989) - Robert McCullam - Private Investigator
- Reason to Die (1990) - Otto
- Any Man's Death (1990) - Ulrich
- Return to Justice (1990) - Cheever
- The Revenger (1990) - Chuck
- The Schoolmaster (1990) - van Wyk
- The Fourth Reich (1990) - Sgt Meintjes
- American Ninja 4: The Annihilation (1990) - Schultz
- Deadly Hunter (a.k.a. Pursuit) (1991) - Crazy Ezra
- Die Prince van Pretoria (1992) - Cragge
- Bopha! (1993) - Retleif
- Orkney Snork Nie! 2 (nog 'n movie) (1993) - Arri
- Project Shadowchaser 2 (1993) - Prine
- Cyborg Cop II (1994) - Fats
- Guns of Honour (1994, TV Movie) - Le Blanc
- Never say Die (1994) - Angel
- Lipstiek Dipstiek (1994) - Frikkie, security guard
- the Redemption (1994)
- Lunar Cop (1995) - Stopper
- Hearts & Minds (1995) - Willem
- Dangerous Ground (1997) - Iron Guard
- Fools (1997) - Whiteman
- Black Velvet Band (1997, TV Movie) - Vermeer
- Tarzan and the Lost City (1998) - High Priest (uncredited)
- An Old Womans Tale (1998, TV Movie) - Neels
- Running Free (1998) - Blacksmith
- Africa (1999) - Garage Owner
- The Meeksville Ghost (2001) - Ox
- Glory, Glory (a.k.a. Hooded Angels) (2002) - Silus
- Stander (2003) - Loud Speaker Cop
- Proteus (2003) - Munster
- Berserker - Hell's Warrior (2004) - Bystander
- Red Dust (2004) - Duty Officer
- Man to Man (2005) - Douglas
- Coup (2006, TV Movie) - Horn
- The Fall (2006) - Luigi / One Legged Actor
- Running Riot (2006) - Vladimir Brutonov
- Forestry in Africa (2006)
- Poena Is Koning (2007) - Security guard
- The Scorpion King 2 (2008) - High Priest
- The Seven of Daran (2008) - Van Pelt
- Deadly Harvest (2008, TV Movie) - Sailor
- Invictus (2009) - Johan De Villiers
- Master Harold...and the Boys (2010) - Man in Bar / Radio news reader
- Beauty (2011) - Gideon
- Il console italiano (2011) - Police Captain
- Angus Buchan's Ordinary People (2012) - Herman Visser
- Leonardo (2012, TV Series)
- Bordering on Bad Behavior (2014) - Australian Minister
- Strikdas (2015) - Adriaan Blignaut
- Snaaks Genoeg (2016) - Dawid van der Merwe
- The Kissing Booth (2018) - Pavilion Security
- Fried Barry (2020) - Alien preacher
