= Project Shadowchaser IV =

- Directed by: Mark Roper
- Written by: Boaz Davidson; Danny Lerner; B.J. Nelson; Mark Roper
- Produced by: Danny Dimbort (executive producer); Avi Lerner (executive producer); Danny Lerner (producer); Trevor Short (executive producer); Yossi Wein (producer)
- Starring: Frank Zagarino; Todd Jensen; Jennifer MacDonald; Greg Melvill-Smith; Brian O'Shaughnessy
- Cinematography: Rod Stewart
- Edited by: Alain Jakubowicz
- Music by: Robert O. Ragland
- Distributed by: Nu Image
- Release date: December 20, 1996
- Running time: 99 minutes
- Country: United States
- Language: English

Project Shadowchaser IV, also known as Shadowchaser IV, Shadowchaser: The Gates Of Time, Orion's Key and Alien Chaser, is a 1996 American direct-to-video science fiction film by director Mark Roper. It is the fourth and final installment in the Project Shadowchaser film series.

== Premise ==
After two archaeologists discover an ancient alien artifact in Africa, they must run for their lives from both the unstoppable guardian and protector that awakens as a result, and their greedy, madman employer, both of whom want the artifact.

== Cast ==
- Frank Zagarino as Sirius
- Todd Jensen as Michael Cavanaugh
- Jennifer MacDonald as Corinne Cavanaugh
- Greg Melvill-Smith as Silver (as Greg Melvill Smith)
- Brian O'Shaughnessy as Professor Morton
- Dave Ridley as Operative #1
- Cordell McQueen as Operative #2 & Arturus
- Greg Poustie as Operative #3
- Chris Olley as Operative #4
- Lesley Fong as Operative #5
- Zane Meas as Operative #6
- Kim Windo as Operative #7
- Roly Jansen as Operative #8
- Tyrone Stevenson as Operative #9
- Bismilla Mdaka as Badimo Sangoma
- Struan Frost as Joey Cavanaugh
- Lindelani Buthelezi as Moses
- Samson Kombule as Sangoma 1
- Pamela Nomvete as Doctor Olin
- Italie Solomons as Policeman in Clinic
- Ian Yule as Odd Job
- Hector Rabotabi as James
- Lucky Mtshali as Dwarf in Bar (as Lucky)
- Vera Blacker as Sister George
- Thato Pitso as 12-year-old boy
- Dick Reineke as Leary
- Professor Mavuso as Doctor 1
- Sello Sebotsane as Sergeant Makojane
- Magi Williams as Jasmine
- Norman Coombes as Father Donald
- Neethling Du Plessis as Orion
- Michael Lewis as Procyon

== Release ==
=== Home media ===
The DVD was released in 1999 by Image Entertainment under license from A-Pix Entertainment. The DVD has now been discontinued and as of March 18, 2010, no plans have been made to release a new DVD of the film.

== See also ==
- Project Shadowchaser
- Project Shadowchaser II
- Project Shadowchaser III
