= Operation Delta Force =

American film series

Operation Delta Force is a telefilm and direct-to-video film series comprising 5 entries.

== Films ==
Film	U.S. release date	Director(s)	Screenwriter(s)	Producer(s)
Operation Delta Force	1997	Sam Firstenberg	David Sparling	Danny Lerner
Operation Delta Force 2: Mayday	1998	Yossi Wein	David Sparling	Danny Lerner
Operation Delta Force 3: Clear Target	1998	Mark Roper	David Sparling	Danny Lerner
Operation Delta Force 4: Deep Fault	1999	Mark Roper	David Sparling	Danny Lerner
Operation Delta Force 5: Random Fire	2000	Yossi Wein	Bernard Stone	Marlow De Mardt, Danny Lerner & Brigid Olen

=== Operation Delta Force (1997) ===
Focusing on the activities of an elite group of US soldiers (Delta Force) as they combat a terrorist group in southern Africa, the film's title apparently attempted to capitalize on the earlier Chuck Norris films The Delta Force and its sequels Delta Force 2: The Colombian Connection and Delta Force 3: The Killing Game.

=== Operation Delta Force 2: Mayday (1998) ===
With global safety at stake, Delta Force - the world's most elite combat unit - is called to eliminate a dangerous international criminal who threatens to unleash nuclear terror unless he receives $25 billion in exchange.

=== Operation Delta Force 3: Clear Target (1998) ===
The anti-terrorist group Delta Force is called into action once again, to deal with a crazed genius who threatens to unleash a biological weapon with the power to kill everyone in New York City.

=== Operation Delta Force 4: Deep Fault (1999) ===
A scientist who worked on a secret government project to develop a weapon to initiate a massive earthquake, has continued his work and now seeks revenge for the cancelation of the project.

=== Operation Delta Force 5: Random Fire (2000) ===
An elite task force is assigned to handle a Middle-Eastern terrorist mastermind who is using mind-control techniques to create an army of willing suicide bombers.
