= Cyborg Cop II =

- Promotional release poster
- Directed by: Sam Firstenberg
- Screenplay by: Jon Stevens
- Story by: Sam Firstenberg
- Produced by: Danny Lerner; David Varod
- Starring: David Bradley; Morgan Hunter; Jill Pierce; Victor Melleney
- Cinematography: Yossi Wein
- Edited by: Marcus Manton
- Music by: Bob Mithoff
- Distributed by: New Line Home Video
- Release date: 1994
- Running time: 97 minutes
- Country: United States
- Language: English

Cyborg Cop II is a 1994 American direct-to-video science-fiction action film directed by Sam Firstenberg and written by Jon Stevens and Firstenberg. It is a sequel to the 1993 film Cyborg Cop, and stars David Bradley, Morgan Hunter, Jill Pierce, and Victor Melleney. It is the second installment in the Cyborg Cop film series.

== Plot ==
Crime boss Jesse Starkraven leads his gang in an attack on a drug den not cooperating with Starkraven's demands; the assault quickly turns into a hostage situation when police arrive. Renegade DEA agent Jack Ryan arrives and attempts to negotiate with Starkraven, but this fails when Starkraven recognizes Ryan as the officer who killed his brother Harlan during a crime some time prior. Starkraven kills several hostages including Ryan's partner before he is finally captured. Subsequently, Starkraven is convicted of killing a cop and sentenced to death.

While awaiting his sentence on death row, Starkraven is kidnapped by government agents under the guise of a prison transfer. He is taken into the custody of the "Anti-Terrorism Group" and converted into a cyborg alongside several other test subjects. Now dubbed "Spartacus" by the scientists, he is meant to lead the army of cyborg soldiers. Meanwhile, Ryan learns of Starkraven's apparent escape and begins conducting an investigation to find him against the orders of his boss, Captain Salerno. He collaborates with former sheriff Sam Pickens, who is still well respected in the community even after being removed from office for looking too far into the ATG's activity.

During a party to celebrate the success of the project, head scientist Dr. Owns takes a woman into the room where Spartacus and the other cyborgs are awaiting activation. While they have a romantic encounter, Spartacus suddenly awakens and attacks them, killing the woman while taking Owns hostage. Spartacus seizes and destroys all but one control bracelet, which he keeps for himself to give himself control over the other cyborgs. He has the other cyborgs kill everyone at the party by burning down the building before leaving in a truck with Owns held hostage for a second facility, where more cyborgs are being created.

ATG project leader Liz McDowell arrives the next day to review the incident and attempts to track down Spartacus quietly. However, Ryan's investigation brings him to her attention. She sends agents to follow him, but he swiftly dispatches them. Later, he breaks into an ATG office to gather information. He is detected by dogs and confronted by security guards, but escapes after discovering proof that Starkraven was taken by the ATG for conversion into a cyborg. Meanwhile, Spartacus and some of the other cyborgs travel to a gas station to steal fuel for their recharging generators. Ryan arrives and saves a woman and young boy from them, but is defeated by Spartacus and nearly killed, but he survives when authorities arrive and critically damage Spartacus, forcing the cyborgs to retreat. Ryan is arrested and brought before McDowell, who warns him not to interfere with the ATG. He subsequently escapes from her men and travels to Pickens' home in order to prepare for an assault on Spartacus's headquarters.

Spartacus announces his intention to conquer cities and convert all humans into cyborgs, establishing an empire with himself as the leader, and dispatches two cyborgs to kill Ryan. Ryan manages to defeat and destroy them, but not before they kill Pickens. McDowell arrives and is convinced by Ryan to team up with him, providing the weaponry necessary to destroy Spartacus. The two arm themselves and travel to the facility where the cyborgs are hiding, destroying a number of them on their way to the lab. Once they get there, Spartacus appears on a video screen and reveals that he has taken Ryan's son hostage. The cyborgs bring Ryan and McDowell before Spartacus, who tells them he will turn Ryan's son into a cyborg before converting them as well. Ryan overpowers the cyborgs, frees his son and fights Spartacus, managing to steal the control bracelet and deactivate the other cyborgs. Spartacus is dropped into electric cables by a magnet, and is killed when Ryan pours liquid onto him, electrocuting him. Ryan, his son and McDowell flee the facility before bombs they set earlier detonate, destroying it.

== Cast ==
- David Bradley as DEA Agent Jack Ryan
- Morgan Hunter as Jesse Starkraven / Spartacus Cyborg
- Jill Pierce as Liz McDowell
- Victor Melleney as Sam Pickens
- Douglas Bristow as Dr. Owns
- Dale Cutts as Captain Salerno
- Adrian Waldron as Jon Travis
- Hector Rabotabi as Mike Alvarez
- Kimberleigh Stark as Gloria Alvarez
- Michael McGovern as Warden Chuck Hunter
- David C. Webb as Eddie Richards
- Frank Notaro as "Stix"
- Robin B. Smith as "Fats"
- Norman Coombes as Mayor Spencer Davis
- Ken Gampu as Police Chief
- Isaac Mavimbela as Carter
- Darryl Werner as Cyborg #1
- Vadim Dobrin as Cyborg #2
- Arthur Berezin as Cyborg #3
- Tyrone Stevenson as Cyborg #4

== Release ==
The film was released on VHS.

== Sequel ==
A sequel titled Cyborg Cop III was released in 1995.
