= The Legend of the Hidden City =

South African action adventure series

The Legend of the Hidden City is a South African action adventure series, directed by David Lister, which was broadcast by SABC and SABC2 between 1996 and 1998 as two series with a total of 39 episodes. It was also shown by Sky1 and Five in the United Kingdom, Network 2 (as part of the children's strand The Den in Ireland), Channel 2 in Jordan, ZBC in Zimbabwe,KBC in Kenya, Fun Channel in The Middle East, Kids Channel in Israel, Canal Famille in Québec, Canada and by YTV in Canada.

== Plot ==
The series followed the lives of archaeology students who discover an ancient city in the wilderness unknown to civilisation. As the series progresses, the youngsters Dean and Thabo who survived the helicopter crash (as does Dean's girlfriend Nina but they believe she's dead for much of the series), endure tests and riches, made friends with the inhabitants of the city.

== Production ==
The series was produced by Dandelion Distribution Ltd, Wehmeyer Productions, SABC (Series 1 only) and Six Street Studios. It was filmed on location and at Johannesburg and Knysna.

A compilation of episodes from the first series was later released on DVD as a film called The Lost City.

=== Series 1 ===
26 half hour episodes.

==== Cast ====
- Brendan Pollecutt as Dean
- Fezile Mpela as Thabo (All episodes except episode 23)
- Robert Finlayson as Lord Ram (later King Ram in episodes 14-26)
- Gina Borthwick as Princess Kama
- Danielle Crouse as Nina (Episodes 1-2/6-26)
- Nkhensani Manganyi as Briah
- Wilson Dunster as Ammon
- Adrienne Pearce as Kabeth
- Andre Jacobs as Morgan
- Clive Scott as King Nerada
- Victor Melleney as Supreme Counsellor Kuth
- Owen Sejake as Inquisitor Balik
- Keith Grenville as Professor Saunders
- Nicky Rebelo as Colonel Senek
- David Dukas as Commander Julak (Episodes 4-5/12-13/24-26)
- Peter Krummeck
- Sello Sebotsane as Oteth
- Michael Richard
- Bill Flynn
- Dale Cutts
- Anthony Bishop as Monek
- Ray Ntlokwana
- Leila Henriques as Commander Nefret
- Michael Swinton
- Charles Kinsman
- John Lesley as Counsellor Murhat
- Iain Winter
- Peter Piccolo
- Brigid Erin Jones as Princess Kama’s Aunt
- Di Appleby
- Robert Fridjohn
- Lisa Hall
- Wandile Mthetwa as the Bolinga Warrior
- Frank Opperman
- Greg Latter
- Norman Coombes
- Gordon Mulholland
- Liz Staughton
- Cathy Minaar
- Peter Gordon
- Sam Williams
- Stephanie Kronson
- Hennie Oosthuizen as the Doctor
- John Maytham
- Gillian Garlick
- Sechaba Morojele as King Ram's Guard (Episode 15)
- Ashley Hayden
- Ulrich Chateris
- Amanda Wilson
- Roley Jansen
- Peter Grobler
- Org Smal
- Jan Tooley
- James Whyle
- Peter Guy
- Thomas Hall
- Julian Munro
- Zane Hannan
- Len Sparrow Hawk
- Tim Mahoney
- David Sherwood as Stall Trader (Episode 15)
- Macair Cox
- Grant Sutherland
- Lillian Dube
- Zukile Quobose
- Samantha Bembridge
- Nick Borain
- Flip Theron
- Kim Van Schoor
- Cait Pocock
- Robin Smith
- Gil Oved
- Ashley Taylor
- Debi Brown
- Shelley Heskin

==== Production crew ====
- Co-Executive Producer: Awie Bosman
- Executive Producer: Noel Cronin
- Line Producer: Peter Clausing
- Production/Costume Designer: Hans Nel
- Director of Photography: Johan Scheepers
- Film Editor: Johan Lategan
- Music Composed by: Toby Langton-Gilks
- Written by: Lindsay Du Plessis, Sheila Keen, Niall Johnson and Stephanie Pickover
- Produced by: Tokkie Wehmeyer
- Directed by: David Lister

=== Series 2 ===
13 half hour episodes

==== Cast ====
- Brendan Pollecutt as Dean
- Fezile Mpela as Thabo
- Robert Finlayson as King Ram
- Gina Borthwick as Queen Kama
- Danny Keogh as Darlock (Episodes 1-12)
- David Dukas as Commander Julak (later Prince Julak in episodes 8-13)
- Nkhensani Manganyi as Briah
- Robert Whitehead as Marek (Episodes 1-8/11-13)
- Wilson Dunster as Ammon
- Adrienne Pearce as Kabeth
- Andre Jacobs as Morgan
- Michael McCabe
- Carrie Glyn
- David Sherwood as Kari's Father
- John Lesley as Counsellor Murhat
- Sechaba Morojele as Inquisitor Larek
- Candice Hillebrand as Kari (Episodes 6/8-13)
- Cait Pocock
- Wandile Mthetwa as Bolinga Warrior
- Donald Woodburn
- Anne Power
- Shelly Meskin
- Alexandra Bowles
- Jonathan Pienaar
- Peter Perry
- Joseph Morapedi
- Sam Williams
- Pats Bookholane
- Greg Melvill-Smith as the Prison Warden
- Neville Thomas as Kanek
- Andrew Horne
- Rick Rogers
- Peter Fenwick
- Leonard Mkhizi
- Timothy Christie
- Sityhilelo Bontsi
- James Edwards
- Simon Dowdeswell
- Vanessa Pike
- Robert McCarthy
- Matthew Roberts
- Hennie Oosthuizen as the Doctor
- Eric Nobbs
- Roland Visser
- Bismillah Nduka
- Richard Nwamba
- Nicholas Ashby
- Iain Winter-Smith
- Candice Herman
- Chris Chameleon
- Roderick Jaftha
- Danielle Crouse as Nina Saunders (Episodes 1-2)
- Andre Marais

==== Production crew ====
- Executive Producer: Noel Cronin
- Line Producer: Johann Schoeman
- Production/Costume Designer: Hans Nel
- Director of Photography: Vincent C. Cox
- Film Editor: Johan Lategan
- Music Composed by: Toby Langton-Gilks
- Written by: Lindsay Du Plessis
- Produced by: Tokkie Wehmeyer
- Directed by: David Lister
- Script Editor: Awie Bosman
