= Gloria Mudau =

South African actress (1927-2011)

- Born: Gloria Mampye Nkomo; 17 January 1927
- Died: September 5, 2011 (aged 86); Alberton, Gauteng, South Africa
- Resting place: Avalon Cemetery, Soweto, Gauteng
- Occupations: Actress, teacher
- Years active: 1986–2008
- Known for: S'gudi S'naysi, Khululeka
- Children: 5

Gloria Mampye Mudau (née Nkomo) (17 January 1927 – 5 September 2011) was a South African actress and educator, best remembered for her comedic television roles on SABC shows such as S'gudi S'naysi ('It's Good It's Nice') and Khululeka ('Be Free').

She began her acting career later in life, after working as a teacher, and became one of the beloved faces of early democratic South African television. She was better known as Louise.

== Career ==
Mudau has been a school teacher since the 1950s. In 1986, she began her acting career in the long-running SABC Zulu comedy series S'gudi S'naysi working for Roberta Durrant, a film director and owner of Penguin Films. She gained national fame for her role as Sis' Louise in the comedy series, where she portrayed a character that became part of South Africa's daily household TV culture.

In 1994, she starred in the comedy-drama Khululeka, a series created to educate first-time voters during South Africa's transition to democracy. She played the role of Sis Pretty, the wife of Hamilton (played by Corney Mabaso), in the show's sixth season in 2004.

Mudau was praised for her ability to bring warmth and subtle humour to her roles, despite being a reserved person off-screen. She stopped acting around 2008, only a few years before her death.

== Personal life and death ==
Gloria Mudau was a mother to five children—four daughters and a son—and had eight grandchildren and a great-grandchild at the time of her death. She died at her daughter's Muofhe Mudau's home in Alberton, Gauteng on 5 September 2011, after a long illness, reported a heart problem. She was 84 years old.
