= Booi =

Booi is a surname that may refer to:

- Allen Booi, South African actor
- Chumani Booi (born 1980), South African rugby union player
- Dawid Boois (born 1952), Namibian politician and educator
- Mnyamezeli Booi
- Ncediwe Nobevu-Booi
- Siyabonga Booi (born 1986), South African cricketer
- Vuyelwa Booi, South African actress, singer and television presenter

== See also ==
- Booij, Dutch surname, probably of the same origin
