= Danie =

Danie is a given name. Notable people with the name include:

- Danie Brits, retired South African professional wrestler and former South African Heavyweight Champion
- Danie Coetzee (born 1977), South African rugby union footballer
- Danie Craven (1910–1993), former Western Province, Eastern Province, Northern Transvaal and Springbok rugby union player
- Danie G. Krige, South African Mining Engineer who pioneered the field of geostatistics
- Danie Gerber (born 1958), former South African rugby union player, who played for South Africa between 1980 and 1992
- Danie Keulder (born 1973), former Namibian cricketer
- Danie Mellor (born 1971), Indigenous Australian artist, winner of the 2009 National Aboriginal & Torres Strait Islander Art Award
- Danie Rossouw (born 1978), South African rugby union footballer who plays as a loose forward
- Danie Visser (born 1961), former professional tennis player from South Africa
- Danie Voges, retired South African professional wrestler who is a former 2-time South African Heavyweight Champion

== See also ==
- Danie Craven Stadium, multi-purpose stadium at Coetzenburg in Stellenbosch, South Africa
- Danie Theron Medal, South African military decoration that was in use from 1970 to 2003
