= Mpela =

Mpela is a surname. Notable people with the surname include:

- Bouro Mpela (born 1975), DR Congolese singer and dancer
- Fezile Mpela (born 1973), South African actor, presenter, singer and rapper
