= Fezile =

Fezile is a masculine given name. Notable people with the name include:

- Fezile Bhengu (born 1954), South African politician
- Fezile Mkhize (born 1991), South African actor, physician and model
- Fezile Mpela (born 1973), South African actor, presenter, singer and rapper
