= S'gudi S'naysi =

South African Zulu sitcom

- Genre: Comedy, Sitcom
- Created by: Roberta Durrant
- Written by: Richard Beynon
- Directed by: Roberta Durrant
- Starring: Joe Mafela (as S’dumo); Daphney Hlomuka (as Sis’ May); Thembi Mtshali (as Thoko); Gloria Mudau (as Louise); Israel Thabede (as Mfundisi)
- Country of origin: South Africa
- Original language: Zulu
- No. of seasons: 6
- No. of episodes: 78

Production
- Producer: Roberta Durrant
- Production locations: Soweto, Gauteng, South Africa
- Camera setup: Multi-camera
- Running time: 30 minutes
- Production company: Penguin Films

Original release
- Network: SABC TV2 (seasons 1–5); CCV-TV (season 6)
- Release: 1 January 1986 – 31 December 1993

S'gudi S'naysi ("It’s Good, It’s Nice") is a popular South African television sitcom that originally aired on the South African Broadcasting Corporation (SABC) from 1986 to 1993. The series, which spans six seasons with a total of 78 half-hour episodes, was created by Roberta Durrant and produced by Penguin Films.

== Overview ==
The series follows the misadventures of an unemployed man, S’dumo, who is taken in as a lodger by a family. Despite numerous money-making schemes, S’dumo consistently fails to pay his rent, relying on his charm to get by, particularly with the ladies. The show is set in a middle-class household in Protea East, Soweto and explores the dynamics between S’dumo and his hosts, which include Sis’ May, a widowed aunt, and her niece, Thoko, an aspiring actress.

== Plot ==
S’dumo, portrayed by Joe Mafela, is a lovable but lazy lodger who moves in with Sis' May (Daphney Hlomuka) and her niece Thoko (Thembi Mtshali) in their Protea East, Soweto home. Sis' May, struggling to make ends meet following the death of her husband David, places an ad for a lodger, and S’dumo applies. Throughout the series, S’dumo devises various get-rich-quick schemes, but none ever succeed, much to the frustration of Sis' May. Despite his lack of success in financial matters, he manages to charm his housemates and win their affection. The show also features a quirky neighbour, Louisa (Gloria Mudau), who is suspicious of S’dumo’s antics and often acts as a foil to his schemes. Another recurring character is the Mfundisi (Israel Thabede), a well-meaning but confused religious figure who occasionally visits for tea.

== Cast ==
- Joe Mafela as S’dumo, the charming but lazy lodger.
- Daphney Hlomuka as Sis' May, the widowed aunt and head of the household.
- Thembi Mtshali as Thoko, Sis' May's beautiful niece and aspiring actress and singer.
- Gloria Mudau as Louise, Sis' May's gossipy neighbour.
- Israel Thabede as Mfundisi, a religious figure who visits the household and loves tea and cake.
- Don Mlangeni Nawa as Laqhasha, a debt collector who often clashes with S'dumo over money he owed to the Mpumalanga Bottlestore
- James Fakazi Msomi as FK and Thando Gumbi as Gundi, the naughty friends of S'dumo who frequent his Sis May's rented room

== Reception and legacy ==
S'gudi S'naysi became one of the most popular and beloved sitcoms in South African television history. Its relatable characters, humour, and portrayal of everyday life in South Africa resonated with audiences. The series consistently topped the SABC’s viewing figures and earned high ratings throughout its run.

The show also made a significant contribution to the careers of its cast, particularly Joe Mafela, who became a household name through his role as S’dumo. His performance was widely praised for bringing warmth and humour to the character of S’dumo, a role that showcased his comedic timing and charm.

== Awards ==
The series won several awards, including:

- Best Drama (1997) - Roberta Durrant for S'gudi S'naysi.
- Best Actor (1997) - Joe Mafela for his role in S'gudi S'naysi.
- Best Script (1997) - Richard Beynon for S'gudi S'naysi.
