= Act of Piracy =

1988 film by John "Bud" Cardos

- Directed by: John "Bud" Cardos
- Written by: Hal Reed
- Produced by: Edgar Bold; Igo Kantor
- Starring: Gary Busey; Belinda Bauer; Ray Sharkey; Nancy Mulford
- Cinematography: Vincent G. Cox
- Edited by: Ettie M. Feldman
- Music by: Morton Stevens
- Production companies: Laurelwood Productions; Toron Screen Corporation; Major Arts Corporation Productions
- Distributed by: Major Releasing Corporation
- Release date: March 16, 1990 (U.S.)
- Running time: 101 minutes
- Countries: United States; South Africa
- Language: English

Act of Piracy is a 1988 American–South African thriller film directed by John "Bud" Cardos and starring Gary Busey, Belinda Bauer, Ray Sharkey and Nancy Mulford. Busey and Bauer play a separated couple who must reunite to free their children from a group of terrorists, among whom is the man's deceitful new girlfriend.

== Plot ==
Ted Andrews persuades his ex-wife Sandy to let their kids Mark and Tracey accompany him and his girlfriend Laura Warner on a journey on his multimillion-dollar yacht to Australia, which he plans to sell upon his arrival there. However, after a few days, it turns out that Laura is member of a terrorist organization led by Jack Wilcox, who wants the boat as a base for his operations. Jack takes over the yacht and only Ted can escape, while Mark and Tracey are kept as hostages. Together with Sandy, Ted starts an international search to find Wilcox, and rescue their children.

== Cast ==
- Gary Busey as Ted Andrews
- Belinda Bauer as Sandy Andrews
- Ray Sharkey as Jack Wilcox
- Nancy Mulford as Laura Warner
- Dennis Casey Park as Dennis
- Arnold Vosloo as Sean Stevens
- Ken Gampu as Herb Bunting
- Anthony Fridjohn as Philip O'Connor
- Mathew Stewardson as Mark Andrews
- Candice Hillebrand as Tracey Andrews
- Nadia Bilchik as Maria
- Roly Jansen as Carlos Ortiz
- Gordon Mulholland as Captain Jenkins
- Thoko Ntshinga as Cynthia
- Melody O'Brian as Nadine Andrews
- Brian O'Shaughnessy as Skipper
- Eckard Rabe as Agent Harris
- Joe Stewardson as Agent Johnson
- Christobel D'Orthez as Karen Daly
- Thys Du Plooy as Ahmed
- Allen Booi as George Chibanda
- Douglas Bristow as C.W. Andrews

== Production ==
=== Development ===
The film's working title was Barracuda, after the ship featured in the story. It was produced by Laurelwood Productions of California in association with the Toron Screen Corporation of South Africa, and part of the financing came from the latter country. This attracted scrutiny, as it breached Hollywood's cultural boycott against the Apartheid regime. Executive producer and South African industry veteran Edgar Bold said: "Our view is that we have no problems making movies here if they're worth making. This movie involves Greece and Africa, so we are shooting the African scenes here in Africa." On the same topic, Busey declared: "I'm an artist, not a politician." He also noted that the film itself was not segregated. However, actress Belinda Bauer was announced to be making the film in Mauritius, rather than South Africa.

=== Filming ===
Principal photography debuted on October 26, 1987. The early part of filming included some exteriors on the Greek island of Skiathos, but the bulk of it took place in Johannesburg, South Africa. Busey planned to be back in the U.S. by January 1988 to start work on his next project.

== Release ==
=== Theatrical ===
It was initially reported that Lorimar had pre-bought the film's U.S. theatrical rights. The company later clarified that it had only acquired the video rights. Act of Piracy was pegged for a Spring 1988 release in the U.S. However, due to financial problems at the distributor, the film was shelved for about two years before receiving a limited release. It opened in Florida and Texas on March 16, 1990, through Major Releasing Corporation and Blossom Pictures.

=== Home media ===
The film was released on U.S. videotape on September 26, 1990, by Lorimar Home Video, and later re-issued by Lorimar's new parent Warner Home Video. It was seen in many international markets first, including the U.K. and Australia, where CBS Fox Video handled both releases in December 1989.

== Reception ==
Act of Piracy had received mostly negative reviews. Roger Hurlburt of the South Florida Sun Sentinel heavily panned the film, which he found "ineptly directed by John 'Bud' Cardos, wretchedly scripted and cheaply made". Alluding to Busey's recent motorcycle accident, he added that "[t]his abominable, often laughable attempt at high adventure and intrigue is enough to put him back into traction." The U.K.'s Lincolnshire Echo called it "a classic case of a promising thriller gone wrong," adding that "the film is made on the cheap, the script is weak, the acting wooden." In The Age of Melbourne, Jim Murphy wrote: "Seldom have I found a leading actor as irritating as Gary Busey playing chip-on-the-shoulder ex-Vietnam divorcee Ted Andrews," adding that the film was "a far-fetched, contrived action piece (with badly staged action)." His Sydney Morning Herald counterpart Tony Squires was more lenient. He acknowledged that "[t]here's not a lot going for this film", but "[d]espite this being a shoot em up yarn with decidedly average production values", he inexplicably "wanted to see poor Ted's battle through the end." TV Guide was also moderately favorable, acknowledging a "[v]iolent, no-frills thriller that's simply loaded with testosterone."

== Soundtrack ==
The film's original score was composed by Morton Stevens, and was his last before passing away. It bears some similarities with the works of Jerry Goldsmith, of whom Stevens had been the assistant. The orchestra was conducted by Ken Thorne. It was released in 1991 by Prometheus Records, the sister label of Belgian film music magazine Soundtrack!, on a CD that also features Stevens' score for Great White as a bonus.
