= Soweto Green =

1995 South African comedy film

- Directed by: David Lister
- Starring: John Kani; L.Scott Caldwell; Casper de Vries
- Release date: 1995
- Language: English Afrikaans

Soweto Green is a 1995 South African comedy film directed by David Lister and starring John Kani, L. Scott Caldwell and Casper de Vries.

== Plot ==
Following the election of Nelson Mandela as president, a middle-class American couple relocate from Los Angeles to Johannesburg to help build the new society. There reality and expectations soon begin to clash.

== Release ==
24 March 1995.

== Cast ==
- John Kani as Dr. Curtis Tshabalala
- L. Scott Caldwell as Cora Tshabalala
- Casper de Vries as Adrian Fluit
- Sandra Prinsloo as Amanda Fluit
- Cobus Rossouw as Voseie Fluit
- Zukile Ggobose as Looksmart
- Nkhensani Manganyi as Thandeka
- Connie Mfuku as Mawe
- Daphney Hlomuka as Tryphina
- Muso Sefatsa as Thandeka
- Sue Pam Grant as Amelia
- Martin Le Maitre as Aubrey
- Francois Stemmer as Leon
- Dambuza Mdledle as Dr. Davel
- Thulane Grubane as Uncle Ho
- Babsy Selela as Lenin
- Nadia Bilchik as Kugel 1
- Eleni Cousins as Kugel 2
- Crispin De Nuys as Mao
- Barbara Nielsen as Eva
- Greg Melvill-Smith as Fritz
- Alan T. Mark as Malhond
