= Greg Melvill-Smith =

South African actor (1961-2016)

- Born: Greg Melvill-Smith; 1961; South Africa
- Died: 31 May 2016 (aged 55); Johannesburg, South Africa
- Education: Tshwane University of Technology
- Occupations: Actor, Director, Writer, Voice artist
- Years active: 1985–2016
- Spouse: Kenda Melvill-Smith
- Children: 2

Greg Melvill-Smith (1961 – 31 May 2016) was a South African actor, director, writer and voice artist. A founding member of the South African Guild of Actors (SAGA), Melvill-Smith is best known for the roles in the television serials such as; Die Vierde Kabinet, 7de Laan, One Way and Isidingo as well as many stage plays across the country.

== Personal life ==
Melvill-Smith was born in 1961 in South Africa. In 1984, he completed the National Diploma in Drama at Pretoria Technikon (currently known as Tshwane University of Technology).

He was married to Kenda and was a father of two daughters: Kaila and Natasha.

In October 2015, Melvill-Smith was diagnosed with cancer. He died on 31 May 2016 at the age of 55 from liver and kidney cancer. The memorial service was held on 4 June 2016 at St Peter's Prep School Chapel, Wittkoppen Road in Johannesburg.

== Career ==
After completing the diploma, he joined the Loft Theatre Company at NAPAC in 1985. Then he performed in many stage plays for three years under the company. Then he moved to Johannesburg in 1988 and worked as a freelance actor. Since then, he acted in many theatre plays such as; The Queen (1995), Love! Valour! Compassion! (1996), King Lear (1998), Vlerkdans (1999), Anthony and Cleopatra (1999) and Sella ou Storie (2004). In 2005, he appeared in Horror Scope at the Grahamstown Festival where he played the role "Tchaikovsky" in a Salon Music production in Pretoria. Then in 2008, he performed in an Actors Centre production Faustus.

In the meantime, he made notable roles in the two plays: Kwamanzi and Horn of Sorrow, both made European tours. He then wrote and directed the stage play Walking Tall. Besides, he directed the operas such as Don Pasquale in 2001, and then Lucia Di Lamamoor and De Fledermaus in 2002. His contribution to Industrial Theatre presentations was significant where he also worked as member of the Theatre Sports team. He conducted Environmental Theatre Workshops, for about six years. In the meantime, he was also involved in Early Man workshops deals with anthropological heritage of South Africa.

As a presenter, he worked on the television program In Touch. In 1991, he appeared in the TV1 drama Die Sonkring with the role "Landdros". After that, he made notable appearances in the serials; 7de Laan, Wild at Heart and The Coconuts. In 2006, he joined with the cast of SABC3 drama serial One Way. He continued to play the role "Nathan" in the second season as well. In 2015, he acted in the Vuzu Amp serial aYeYe with the role "Wallie". Then he made a supportive role of "Mr Edwards" in the eleventh season of kykNET soap opera Binnelanders. In the same year, he joined with the second season of Hollywood period drama adventure serial Black Sails and played the role "Admiral Hennessey".

In 1988, he made his film debut with the role of "bar fighter" in the film Blind Justice. Since then he acted in many feature films, such as; The Sorcerer's Apprentice for Peakviewing Productions, Mr Bones, Drum, The Bang Bang Club, Night Drive and District 9.

== Filmography ==
Year	Film	Role	Genre	Ref.
1988	Blind Justice	Bar fighter	Films	
1988	Paradise Road	Sgt. Major Smale	Films	
1989	Saartjie	Mr. van Heerden	TV series	
1989	The Tattoo Chase	Cameraman	Films	
1989	Brutal Glory	Doorman	Video	
1989	Barney Barnato	Schneider's Thug	TV mini series	
1990	That Englishwoman	Officer in charge of farm removals	Films	
1990	Die Binnekring	Melville	TV movie	
1990	Killer Instinct	German Colleague	Films	
1991	Tödliche Geschäfte	Foreman	Films	
1991	Die Sonkring	Landdros	TV series	
1992	Timber	Kevin Gates	TV movie	
1992	The Angel, the Bicycle and the Chinaman's Finger	Cronin	Films	
1993	African Skies	Sergeant	TV series	
1993	Tropical Heat	Arthur	TV series	
1994	MMG Engineers	Mike Thomas	TV series	
1994	Triptiek	Majoor van Niekerk	TV series	
1994	Guns of Honor	Haze	TV movie	
1994	Where Angels Tread	Archer Household	TV series	
1995	Soweto Green	Malhond	Films	
1995	Forgotten Hat	Dad	Films	
1995	The Secret Force	Skully Ball	Films	
1996	Jackpot	Reg Levinson	TV series	
1996	Homeland	George Slater	TV series	
1996	Rhodes	Captain Widdowson	TV mini series	
1996	Project Shadowchaser IV	Silver	Films	
1997	Tarzan: The Epic Adventures	Harry	TV series	
1997	Merchant of Death	Harry	Films	
1997	Operation Delta Force 2: Mayday	Harry	TV movie	
1997	Black Velvet Band	Harry	TV movie	
1997	The Legend of the Hidden City	Harry	TV series	
1998	Sweepers	Harry	Films	
1998	Die Vierde Kabinet	Smith	TV series	
	7de Laan	Guest role	TV series	
1999	Iemand om lief te hê	Harry	TV series	
1999	Cold Harvest	Harry	Films	
1999	Dazzle	Harry	Films	
2000	Operation Delta Force 5: Random Fire	Harry	Films	
2001	The Sorcerer's Apprentice	Mike Clark	Films	
2001	Mr. Bones	Harry	Films	
2002	Arsenaal	Smith	TV series	
2002	Hooded Angels	Confederate general	Films	
2003	Hoodlum & Son	Police Sergeant	Films	
2004	Oh Schuks ... I'm Gatvol!	Australian Bruce	Films	
2004	Berserker	Lead Viking	Films	
2004	A Case of Murder	Assistant Station Master	Films	
2004	Drum	Major Att Spengler	Films	
2004	Platinum	Alexander Merensky	TV series	
2004	The Eastern Bride	Michael	Video	
2005	Blood of Beasts	Thorsson	Films	
2006	One Way	Nathan	TV series	
2006	Wild at Heart	Cory	TV series	
2006	Sibahle	Wilhelm	Short films	
2008	Triomf	AWB militant	Films	
2008	The Coconuts	Jan	TV series	
2009	District 9	Interviewer	Films	
2010	The Bang Bang Club	Jacques Hugo	Films	
2010	Night Drive	Jack Darwin	Films	
2015	The Message	Vorster	TV movie	
2015	aYeYe	Wallie	TV series	
2015	Binnelanders	Mr Edwards	TV series	
2015	Black Sails	Admiral Hennessey	TV series	
2015	Roer Jou Voete	Bernhardt de Witt	TV series	
2016	The Journey Is the Destination	F. W. de Klerk	Films	
2016	Sokhulu & Partners	Principal Ryan	TV series	
2016	Igazi	Harry	TV series	
	Isidingo	Guest role	TV series	
