= Daphney Hlomuka =

South African actress (1949-2008)

- Born: Daphney Hlomuka; 1949; Durban, South Africa
- Died: 1 October 2008 (aged 58–59); Johannesburg, Gauteng
- Occupation: Actress
- Years active: 1968–2008

Duduzile Daphney Ngubane (née Hlomuka; 1949 – 1 October 2008) was a South African English-Zulu language script translator, television, film, radio and stage actress. On the small screen, Hlomuka was perhaps best known to audiences for her role as MaMkhize (Mrs Mhlongo) in the television drama series, Hlala Kwabafileyo, and as Sis May in the comedy, S'gudi S'naysi, opposite Joe Mafela.

== Biography ==
Hlomuka was born in Durban, South Africa, but raised in KwaMashu during the Apartheid era. She began acting in the theater in Durban in 1968, and was considered to be a protégé of the Durban-based playwright, Welcome Msomi. Her earliest theater credits included performances in two of Msomi's theatrical productions: Qombeni and Umabatha, which was a Zulu adaptation of William Shakespeare's Macbeth. Umabatha became one of Msomu's most famous works. Hlomuka worked in Zulu-language radio plays in the interim between Qombeni and Umabatha.

She left South Africa briefly during the 1970s to tour with the cast of Ipi Tombi in Europe. During the 1960s and 1970s, roles on screen or stage for black actors in South Africa were often difficult to find due to Apartheid. Hlomuka often appeared off-screen as a radio actor in several popular Zulu drama series.

Hlomuka finally had success on South African television during the 1980s when she was cast in the role of MaMhlongo in the dramatic television series, Hlala Kwabafileyo. Her character, MaMhlongo, was the wife and widow of a wealthy tycoon. To this day in South Africa, the word MaMgobhozi, which originated from the series and Ruth Cele's character, describes the gossip habits attributed to women.

She also appeared in the 1980s television comedy, S'gudi S'naysi, opposite well known actor, Joe Mafela. Mafela portrayed the tenant, S'dumo. Hlomuka's character, Sis May, was S'dumo's well-intentioned, tolerant landlady. The series was popular during its run.

Hlomuka's film and television credits spanned the 1980s, 1990s and 2000s (decade). She appeared in the 1995 film, Soweto Green as a maid and housekeeper named Tryphina, opposite actor John Kani. She also starred as Queen Ntombazi in the 1986 South African television miniseries, Shaka Zulu. She also starred on the SABC 1 series Gugu no Andile, as her aunt. She also appeared in the 1996 syndicated television series, Tarzan: The Epic Adventures.

Her most recent roles included Rhythm City, as well as a controversial Nguni language adaptation of the Shakespearean romantic tragedy, Romeo and Juliet.

Daphney Hlomuka died of kidney cancer at Charlotte Maxeke Hospital in Johannesburg on 1 October 2008, at the age of 59. She was survived by her husband, Elliot Ngubane, and their four children.

== Filmography ==
- S'gudi Snaysi (1986)
- Hlala Kwabafileyo (1990)
- Ubambo Lwami (1996)
- uGugu no Andile (2008)
