= Prisoners of the Lost Universe =

1983 British film

- Theatrical release poster
- Directed by: Terry Marcel
- Screenplay by: Terry Marcel; Harry Robertson
- Story by: Terry Marcel; Harry Robertson
- Produced by: Harry Robertson
- Starring: Richard Hatch; Kay Lenz; John Saxon
- Cinematography: Derek Browne
- Edited by: Alan Jones
- Music by: Harry Robertson
- Production companies: Marcel/Robertson; United Media Finance Ltd.
- Distributed by: Premier Releasing
- Release date: 15 August 1983 (United States)
- Running time: 84 minutes
- Country: United Kingdom
- Language: English

Prisoners of the Lost Universe is a 1983 British fantasy science fiction action film directed by Terry Marcel and written by Marcel and Harry Robertson. Shot in South Africa, three people are transported to a parallel universe when an earthquake occurs just as the scientist is experimenting with his "matter" transmitter. The trio must escape the strange world of Vonya while dealing with a number of villains.

== Cast ==
- Richard Hatch as Dan Roebuck
- Kay Lenz as Carrie Madison
- John Saxon as Kleel
- Larry Taylor as Vosk
- Peter O'Farrell as Malachi
- Ray Charleson as The Greenman
- Kenneth Hendel as Dr Hartmann
- Philip Van der Byl as The Manbeast
- Dawn Abraham as Shareen
- Ron Smerczak as Head Trader
- Charles Comyn as Treet
- Ian Steadman as 1st Prisoner
- Bill Flynn as 2nd Prisoner
- Danie Voges as Giant Nabu
- Myles Robertson as Waterbeast
