= Penguin Films =

South African film and television production company

- Type: Private
- Industry: Film; TV
- Founded: 1982; 44 years ago
- Founder: Roberta Durrant
- Headquarters: Cape Town, South Africa
- Products: Feature films Television series
- Website: penguinfilms.co.za

Penguin Films is a South African film and television production company based in Cape Town, South Africa. It is noted for its work in feature films, long-form drama and comedy and educational programming.

Established in 1982, it has achieved both local and international acclaim, with multiple award-winning productions across film festivals, television award ceremonies and children’s programming.

== History ==
Founded in 1982 by Roberta Durrant, Penguin Films first gained prominence with its groundbreaking democracy-education series Khululeka ("Be Free"), commissioned by the Matla Trust and broadcast between 1994 and 2009. The series was designed to inform South Africa’s first-time voters on democratic principles following the end of apartheid.

In collaboration with the Wits University's Centre for Applied Legal Studies, Penguin Films produced Future Imperfect (1993–2000), a talk show hosted by Professor Dennis Davis profiling South African leaders in exile.

Over the ensuing decades, Penguin Films expanded into feature-film production and long-form television, forging partnerships with local broadcasters such as M-Net, kykNET, South African Broadcasting Corporation and international networks including Disney Channel and Showmax.

== Filmography ==
=== Feature films ===
- Inside Out (1998) – Distributed by Ster Kinekor and Icon Entertainment
- Skilpoppe (2004) – Premiered as M-Net Movie of the Month
- Felix (2013) – Distributed by Off the Fence; sold to the UK, Italy, Turkey, Australia and most of Africa
- Ingoma (2016) – Won six SAFTAs, including Best Made-for-TV Movie
- Krotoa (2017) – Distributed by Shoreline Entertainment (USA)

=== Television ===
==== Drama series ====
- Saints and Sinners (Seasons 1–3) – Mzansi Magic/M-Net
- Rng of Lies – M-Net telenovela
- Sara se Geheim – kykNET
- Home Affairs – SABC (International Emmy nominations; Golden Rose special mention; Banff finalist)
- Sokhulu and Partners – SABC (International Emmy nominations)
- Ambitions – eTV
- Isikizi – Mzansi Magic
- Z’bondiwe – eTV
- Izingane Zobaba
- Montana
- Shreds and Dreams
- Forced Love – SABC

==== Children’s programming ====
- Disney Cookabout – Co-production with The Walt Disney Company; broadcast on SABC and Disney Channels in the UK, South Africa, Turkey and Greece. It won the 2017 SAFTA for Best Children’s Programme; nominated for the 2017 International Emmy Kids Awards

==== Sitcoms ====
- S'gudi Snaysi (It’s Good, It’s Nice) – SABC
- Going Up (Seasons 1–4) – SABC
- About Us – SABC
- Madam & Eve (Seasons 1–3) – eTV
- SOS – eTV
- Fishy Feshuns
- Going Up Again
- Mazinyo dot Q
- Stokvel – various seasons on SABC/eTV

== Awards and nominations ==
In April 2007, Penguin Films retained the publicity and event management agency Celebrity Services Africa to handle publicity for the international award nominations of Home Affairs 2, as well as for the upcoming series of Home Affairs. The show, an ensemble drama that explores the interconnected lives of six women, was nominated for both the Banff International Television Award and the Rose d'Or, two prestigious international accolades.

The company's founder, Roberta Durrant is a Lifetime Achievement Award holder.

=== Film awards ===
- Krotoa

Best Film Awards

- Harlem International Film Festival: Best Film
- Montreal International Black Film Festival: Best Narrative Feature
- Depth of Field International Film Festival: Best of Show
- IndieFEST Film Awards: Best of Show
- Accolade Global Film Competition: Award of Excellence Special Mention ( Women Filmmakers)
- World Woman Awards: World Platinum Award
- Filmmakers World Festival: Diamond Award
- International Film Festival for Women, Social Issues and Zero Discrimination: Award of Excellence
- International Movie Awards: Platinum Award
- Felix

Awards and accolades

- TIFF Kids Young People’s Jury Award: Best Feature Film Audience Choice
- Durban International Film Festival: Lucas Award (2013)
- Frankfurt Lucas Film Festival: Lucas Award
- Cinekid Audience Award: Best Film
- Pan African Film Festival (Amsterdam Awards): Best Film
- Tumbleweeds Festival (USA): Audience Award
- European Youth Film Festival (Belgium): Best Film
- Ale Kino Festival (Poland): Best Feature Film

=== Television awards ===
Awards and nominations

- SAFTA Wins:
  - Best Made-for-TV Movie: Ingoma (2016)
  - Best Children’s Programme: Disney Cookabout (2017)
  - Best Ensemble TV Comedy (2010, 2012)
  - Best Editing for Drama (2016)
- Tempo Award
  - Best Television Series: Sara se Geheim (2018)
  - International Emmy nominations: Home Affairs (2006, 2007), Sokhulu and Partners (2009) and Stokvel (Sitcom category, 2004)
- Rose d’Or Awards
  - Special Mention: Home Affairs (2007)
  - Bronze Rose: Madam & Eve (2002)
- Banff World Media Festival
  - Finalist: Home Affairs (2007)

== Other productions ==
- Arendsvlei:
  - 156-episode Afrikaans telenovela for kykNET & kie (transmission commenced 1 October 2018)
- Die Sentrum:
  - First original Afrikaans telenovela for SABC 2
- Love, Lies and Hybrids: Made-for-TV feature for M-Net and Showmax
