= Danie Voges =

- Voges (right) dominating an opponent in a match from the early part of his career

Personal information
- Born: January 1, 1954 Johannesburg, South Africa
- Died: January 10, 2021 (aged 67) Johannesburg, South Africa

Professional wrestling career
- Ring name(s): Danie Voges; Donny Voges; Danie Vogues; Danie "The Hulk of Africa" Voges
- Billed height: 6 ft 5 in (1.96 m)
- Billed weight: 275 lb (125 kg)
- Billed from: Johannesburg, South Africa
- Debut: 1982
- Retired: 1999

Danie Voges (1 January 1954 – January 10, 2021) was a South African professional wrestler who is a former 2-time South African Heavyweight Champion.

== Career ==
=== Early life ===
Danie Voges was a multi-time Springbok amateur wrestling champion before debuting in 1982 for Bronco Universal Promotions.

=== Bronco Universal Promotions/Interworld Wrestling Promotions (1982–1992) ===
Danie Voges made his professional wrestling debut in 1982 under his real name. In February 1986, Danie Voges defeated Hans Booch in Cape Town, South Africa. On 6 March 1986, Danie Voges emerged victorious against the Mexican Mongol in what was described at the time to be one of the bloodiest matches in South African wrestling history. On 27 March 1986, Danie Voges and Tornado Danie Brits defeated Hans Rooks and John Powers in a two-out-of-three falls match 2 to 1. Nearly a decade after his debut, in August 1986 he captured the previously vacant South African Heavyweight Title, becoming the fifth champion in the title's history and succeeding Jan Wilkens. On 25 September 1986, Danie Voges successfully defended the South African Heavyweight Title against Hacksaw Higgins. In October 1986, Danie Voges had a three-match title series all over the country with Kevin Wacholz over the South African Heavyweight Title. On 10 September 1987, Danie Voges successfully defended the South African Heavyweight Title against Mark Calloway in Durban, South Africa. On 4 June 1988, Danie Voges teamed up with Steve Simpson and Kalahari Boerboel to beat Gama Singh, Black Bart and Bill Irwin in a six-man tag team match. On 21 September 1989, Danie Voges teamed up with former tag team partner Danie Brits for the first time in over three years to take on Munro and Big Ox Baker at the Portuguese Hall for Interworld Wrestling Promotions. In June 1990, he lost the South African Heavyweight Title to Danie Brits. Two months later, in August 1990, Voges would capture the title for the second time from Brits.

=== World Wrestling Council (1994) ===
In 1994, Danie Voges and Danie Brits toured Puerto Rico's World Wrestling Council promotion. They competed in the tag team division under the name The Fighting Springboks.

=== All Stars Wrestling (1993–1999) ===
On 21 May 1994, Danie Voges and Gama Singh lost to Giant Warrior and Danie Brits in a tag team match. On 22 July 1994, Danie Voges teamed up with Danie Brits, losing to the American Wrecking Crew of Robbie Rage and Mike Fury at the Sun City Superbowl in an inter-promotional supercard. On 30 September 1995, Danie Voges challenged unsuccessfully for the Super-Heavyweight Title held by Giant Warrior. On 29 March 1996, Danie Voges defeated The Viking by disqualification in Johannesburg, South Africa. On 14 December 1996, Danie Voges teamed up with Gama Singh to defeat Giant Warrior and Magic Dragon. Voges retired in 1999.

== In Films ==
Danie Voges appeared in Prisoners of the Lost Universe (1983) as Giant Nabu. He also appeared in Thieves of Fortune (1990) as Gomez.

== Personal life ==
Danie Voges is the direct uncle of World Wrestling Professionals wrestler Ananzi, who he also trained. Voges is the real-life half-brother of former Fighting Springboks tag team partner Danie Brits. Danie Voges was the head coach of Egerton wrestling club, brought in by Mr Schulk Smuts (Former principal of Egerton Primary school) and Mr Koekomoer to coach in Ladysmith at Egerton Primary School. He had a unique liberal coaching style and was found always saying to his wrestlers "My coaching ends at practice. It's up to you now".

== Championships and accomplishments ==
- All Stars Wrestling
  - IWF Super-Heavyweight Title
  - IWF Tag Team Titles (w/ Danie Brits)
- Bronco Universal Promotions
  - South African Heavyweight Title (2 times)
- Universal Wrestling Federation
  - UWF South African Heavyweight Title
- Pro Wrestling Illustrated
  - PWI ranked him #334 of the 500 best singles wrestlers in 1994
