= The Villagers (TV series) =

South African soapie

- Title shot from the first season of The Villagers in 1976 of sheave wheels on top of a gold mine shaft tower.
- Written by: John Cundill
- Directed by: Gray Hofmeyr
- Starring: Brian O'Shaughnessy; Gordon Mulholland; Clive Scott
- Country of origin: South Africa
- Original language: English
- No. of seasons: 3

Production
- Running time: 25 minutes

Original release
- Release: 5 April 1976 – 1978

The Villagers is the first English-language drama produced for South African television, first airing in April 1976 on SABC, only four months after television was first broadcast nationwide in South Africa. It was acclaimed at the time for its high quality and was well received by audiences, gaining a cult following in later years. The drama was written by John Cundill and directed by Gray Hofmeyr. It is regarded as the forerunner to the long running South African television series Isidingo, a soap opera also set in a gold mining town on the Witwatersrand.

== Premise ==
Set in a small mining town on the Witwatersrand, it focuses on the operations of the fictional Village Reef gold mine. The story is set following the unexpected death of the mine's general manager; it is widely anticipated that the assistant manager, Buller Wilmot, will be appointed to the position. However, the role is given instead to Hilton McRae, a newcomer. The story focuses on both the community's adjustment to McRae's leadership and the McRae family's adaptation to life in a small town.

== Cast ==
- Brian O'Shaughnessy (Buller Wilmot)
- Gordon Mulholland (Hilton McRae)
- Graham Clarke (Nick Wilmot)
- Stuart Brown (Chesa Labuschagne)
- Clive Scott (Ted Dixon)
- Valerie Dunlop (Diana McRae)
- Beryl Gordon (Betsie Wilmot)
- Diana Cox (Wendy McRae)
- Mary-Anne Duval (Sally Wilmot)
- Barbara Itzler (Cynthia Holmes)
- Doreen Lamb (Connie Labuschagne)
- Moira Winslow (Nell Clay)
- Dale Cutts (Basil Clay)
- Victor Melleney (C.P. Bradley)
- Ian Hamilton (Dugald Fitzgerald)
- Nigel Vermaas (Dr. Chris de Villiers)
- Aubrey Ellis (Doep du Plessis)
- David Sherwood (Simon McRae)
- Albert Raphael (Rocky Roxburgh)
- Ian Lawrence (Wally Bradford)
- Magda Beukes (Adele Venter)
