= Gordon Mulholland =

British actor (1921–2010)

Gordon Mulholland (30 April 1921, Cape Town, South Africa – 30 June 2010, East London, South Africa) was a South African actor best known for his performances in the TV soap opera The Villagers and the movie Jock of the Bushveld.

== Early life ==
He was born in Cape Town in 1921 to parents Sam Mulholland and Nell. It was not a happy upbringing; he was the only child of five to survive childhood. His mother was the main breadwinner while his father was described as crook and a drunkard. He was eventually taken into care at Nazareth House. He attended Marist Brothers College but failed to complete matric.

== Career ==
During World War II, he joined the army entertainment corps and entertained the troops as a stand-up comedian in North Africa and Italy, performing with Sid James and Laurence Harvey. After the war ended, he left for London and performed at variety and music halls including the Windmill Theatre. He eventually migrated to West End theatres, performing in productions such as Guys and Dolls and Kiss Me Kate. He later starred in minor roles in British film productions.

He returned to South Africa in 1967, making his career in theatre and on Springbok Radio with Adrian Steed and Cyril Green. When television arrived in South Africa in 1976, he starred in The Villagers as mining boss Hilton McRae. He performed in theatre with Rex Garner and Clive Scott, and some of his major productions included Fiddler on the Roof and My Fair Lady.

== Marriage ==
Mulholland was married twice, first to Muff Evans and secondly to actress Diane Wilson, whom he married in 1963 but divorced in 1972. He had three sons from the two marriages: Sean, Matthew and Jamie.

== Death ==
Mulholland suffered a stroke in 2009, leaving his left side paralyzed, and after spending a year in a nursing home, he was brought back to East London and died at his son's home.

== Selected filmography ==
=== Film ===
- Treasure Island (1950) – Durgin
- The Lady Craved Excitement (1950) – A Lunatic
- Cheer the Brave (1951)
- Hands of Space (1961)
- Coast of Skeletons (1965) – Mr. Spyker
- Der Rivonia-Prozess (1966) – Farmer (uncredited)
- Kruger Miljoene (1967) – Balloon observer (voice, uncredited)
- The Cape Town Affair (1967) – Warrant Officer du Plessis
- The Professor and the Beauty Queen (1967) – Joe
- Stop Exchange (1970)
- Vengeance Cops (1971) – Capt. Venter (voice, uncredited)
- Z.E.B.R.A. (1971) – Charles Lester (English version) (voice, uncredited)
- One Away (1976) – Detective, 'Big man'
- Mister Deathman (1977) – Dr. Halstead
- Jock of the Bushveld (1986) – Tom Barnett
- Act of Piracy (1988) – Captain Jenkins
- Headhunter (1988) – Prof. Robert Sinclair
- Rising Storm (1989) – Whitefish Aldana
- River of Death (1989) – Fanjul
- The Evil Below (1989) – Max Cash Senior
- Accidents (1989) – Tom Black
- Act of Piracy (1990) – Loring
- Traitor's Heart (1999) – Donald Brody

=== Television ===
- The Villagers (1976-1978)
- Westgate (1981) – Warren Bartlett
