= Thandi Brewer =

South African showrunner (died 2019)

- Died: 12 June 2019
- Occupations: Showrunner, screenwriter, film producer, director, script editor

Thandi Brewer (died 12 June 2019) was a South African showrunner, screenwriter, film producer, director, and script editor.

== Early life and family ==
Brewer was born in South Africa and lived in Lower Houghton, Johannesburg, before relocating to the rural Hennops River region.

She came from a family that worked in the South African entertainment industry. Her grandfather was Jimmy Hunter, a stand-up comic and producer of Jimmy Hunter's Brighton Follies. Her father, Bill Brewer, was a cartoonist, actor, musician, composer, writer, and critic for the Sunday Times (South Africa). Her mother, British-born actress and writer Fiona Fraser, received a Lifetime Achievement Award at the Naledi Theatre Awards in 2005.

Brewer began performing as a child, appearing in a diaper commercial at six months old. Her early acting credits include the films Majuba and Escape Route Cape Town, and at age 5, she starred in the radio show Thandi Time.

== Career ==
=== Theatre and early writing ===
As a writer and director for the stage, Brewer's work included My Mother, Myself, Two Singers - Khuluma, Letters of Love, Lust, and Living, Alice in Africa, Azanyan Fairytales, The Will to Die, and Alternatives Anonymous. Her second play, Please Hold I'm Coming, was performed at the Civic Theatre in Johannesburg.

In 1995, her first play, Samuel's Fugue, won the Soundscapes competition for Best South African Play and was broadcast the same year, earning her a nomination for an Artes Award for Best Script in 1996. She went on to write for the series Dynamite Diepkloof Dudes and her script Nodedancing was a finalist in the Xencat/Channel 4 script writing competition.

=== Television and film ===
Brewer wrote and directed the 26-part drama 37 Honey Street for SABC 2, which featured one of the first lesbian kisses on South African television. She created and produced Usindiso/Redemption!! with Bridget Pickering. The series was a regional semi-finalist for best drama at the 2008 International Emmy Awards, won four SAFTAs, and peaked at 4.3 million viewers per episode on SABC 1.

Her other notable productions include Sticks and Stones, the first South African series to include audiovisual description for visually impaired audiences, and the political thriller End Game, which aired on SABC 1. She also created the 156-part telenovela Keeping Score for SABC 2.

Her feature film screenplays include The Story of an African Farm, starring Richard E. Grant, and The Chemo Club, which was nominated for a WGSA Muse Award in 2015 and marked her directorial debut. She also worked as a script doctor on Otelo Burning.

== Advocacy and industry roles ==
Brewer was a founding member and the first Chair of the Writers' Guild of South Africa (WGSA). She also served on the executive committee of the South African Screen Federation (SASFED), as Co-Secretary in 2009 and holding the Communications position in 2010.

She was a screenwriting mentor for several programs, including the NFVF Spark writers programme, M-Net's East African programme in Kenya, and the Namibian Film Commission's short film slate. She also served as the screenwriting Chair for AFDA.

== Personal life ==
Brewer was public about her experiences with cancer, which included a double mastectomy. She died on 12 June 2019.

== Selected filmography ==
=== Writer ===
- 2004: The Story of an African Farm
- 2011: 37 Honey Street (TV series)
- 2013: End Game (TV series)
- 2019: The Chemo Club (also director)

=== Script Doctor ===
- 1998: Otelo Burning

=== Actress ===
- 1968: Majuba: Heuwel van Duiwe – Klein Johanna
- 1993: African Skies (TV series) – Donna
