= South African Heavyweight Championship =

Inactive professional wrestling championship

South African Heavyweight Title

Details
- Promotion: Interworld Wrestling Promotions
- Date established: 1950
- Date retired: 1990
Statistics
- First champion(s): Willie Liebenberg
- Most reigns: 2 (Tied: Mr X, Danie Voges)
- Longest reign: Jan Wilkens (10 years)
- Shortest reign: Danie Brits (1 month)
- Oldest champion: Jan Wilkens
- Youngest champion: Danie Brits
- Heaviest champion: Jan Wilkens
- Lightest champion: Danie Brits

The South African Heavyweight Title is an inactive professional wrestling championship that was once competed for in the now-defunct South African professional wrestling promotion Interworld Wrestling Promotions, contested exclusively among Heavyweight (110 kg (240 lb)) wrestlers. It was created in 1950 and the first champion was Willie Liebenberg. The last champion to win it was Danie Voges, who subsequently retired the belt in 1990.

== Title history ==
| Wrestlers | Reign | Date | Location | Notes |
|---|---|---|---|---|
| Willie Liebenberg | 1 | 1950 | Johannesburg, South Africa | |
| Mr X (Percy Hall) | 1 | 3 April 1954 | Johannesburg, South Africa | |
| Mr X (Percy Hall) | 2 | 1965 | Johannesburg, South Africa | |
| Jan Wilkens | 1 | 1974 | Johannesburg, South Africa | Declared vacant in 1984 when Jan Wilkens retires. |
| Danie Voges | 1 | August 1986 | Pretoria, South Africa | Defeated Danie Brits to win the title. |
| Danie Brits | 1 | June 1990 | Cape Town, South Africa | |
| Danie Voges | 2 | August 1990 | Cape Town, South Africa | |

== See also ==
- CWA World Heavyweight Championship
- EWU World Super Heavyweight Championship
