= John Cundill =

- Born: May 30, 1936; Germiston, South Africa
- Died: February 2016 (aged 79); Maleny, Queensland, Australia
- Education: University of Cape Town (B.A.
- Occupations: Television and film scriptwriter playwright journalist
- Spouse: Mirella Cundill
- Children: Liam, Nicky and Scott
- Relatives: Algy Cundill (father)
- Writing career
- Period: 1976–2001
- Genre: Television

John Cundill (1936–2016) was a South African born television scriptwriter, playwright, journalist and actor. He is best known in South Africa as the television scriptwriter for The Villagers and Westgate series. He would later write several screenplays for Australian films and television shows.

== Early life ==
Cundill was born on 30 May 1936 in Germiston, South Africa. His father, Algy Cundill was a mine manager at a large mine owned by Gold Fields. He would be educated at St John's College in Houghton, Johannesburg. After high school, he attended the University of Cape Town where he wanted to study drama, but on his father's insistence, obtained a Bachelor of Arts degree.

== Career ==
Before becoming a journalist, he appeared on stage in Cape Town in Doctor in the House with Nigel Hawthorne in 1958. By 1963, he had joined the Johannesburg-based newspaper, The Star, and would also serve as their foreign correspondent in London and New York. Leaving the newspaper, he would work for a public relations firm Group Editors.

In 1966, writing plays as a hobby, he would win a SABC English radio play prize for To The End of the Road. With the introduction of television at the SABC in 1976, he would write the scripts for the television drama series The Villagers, set on a mine in the Witwatersrand and ran from 1976 until 1978. His next television series was a 26-episode comedy called Oh George. Other television series during the 1980s included Westgate, a boardroom family drama and 1922, a historical mining drama set during the Rand Rebellion. In 1986, he would write the screenplay for Jock of the Bushveld, based on the book of the same name by Percy Fitzpatrick.

In 1988, he immigrated to Australia and worked in Perth and Sydney where he co-wrote screenplays for television and films. He would retire later to Maleny, Queensland, where he continued to write plays such as Unforced Errors, The Eulogy and Up The Tiber and acted on stage.

== Death ==
He was diagnosed with cancer in 2015 and died aged 79 in February 2016 in Maleny, Queensland. He left behind a wife Mirella and three children, Liam, Nicky and Scott.

== Selected credits ==
Following is a list of his works:

- The Villagers, 1976–78, (writer)
- Duet, 1977, (writer)
- The Chicken Run, 1979, (writer)
- Oh George!, 1979, (writer)
- Westgate, 1981, (writer)
- Westgate II, 1982, (writer)
- The Earth Mover, 1983, (writer)
- The Hiding of Black Bill, 1983, (writer)
- The Outcast, 1983, (co-writer)
- 1922, 1984, (writer)
- Two Weeks in Paradise, 1985, (writer)
- Westgate III, 1985, (co-writer)
- Jock of the Bushveld, 1986, (writer)
- The Mantis Project, 1987, (co-writer)
- John Ross: An African Adventure, 1987, (co-writer)
- Embassy, 1990, (co-writer)
- Jackaroo, 1990, (writer)
- The Angel, the Bicycle and the Chinaman's Finger, 1992, (co-writer)
- Love in Limbo, 1993, (writer)
- Secrets, 1993, (co-writer)
- Ship to Shore, 1993, (co-writer 2 episodes)
- Heartland, 1994, (co-writer 2 episodes)
- G.P., 1994, (co-writer 1 episode)
- Janus, 1995, (co-writer 1 episode)
- Never Tell Me Never, 1998, (writer)
- Askari, 2001, (co-writer)

== Awards and nominations ==
- Three SABC drama awards
- 1978 winner Olive Schreiner Prize for two short plays – Redundant and Waiting
- 1995 winner Logie Awards for Janus – Most Outstanding Drama Series
- 1991 winner Logie Awards for Jackaroo – Most Popular Telemovie or Mini Series
- 2008 winner National One Act Playwriting Competition – Audience Choice : Nancy Cato Award for The Eulogy
