= Thieves of Fortune =

1989 film by Michael MacCarthy

- Directed by: Michael MacCarthy
- Starring: Michael Nouri; Lee Van Cleef; Shawn Weatherly
- Release date: 1990
- Running time: 100 minutes
- Countries: United States; South Africa
- Language: English

Thieves of Fortune (other titles - Chameleon and May the Best Man Win) is a 1990 American - South African action film directed by Michael MacCarthy. It is Lee Van Cleef's last film, released the year after he died of a heart attack.

== Premise ==
To inherit a large fortune, a woman must undertake a series of challenging and potentially dangerous tasks, while also pursuing a romantic relationship with the man she loves.

== Production ==
Originally filmed in 1988 on location in South Africa.

== Release ==
The film was released in South African cinemas on 19 October 1990, and went straight to video in America on 31 May 1990.

== Cast ==
- Michael Nouri as Comandante Juan Luis Ferreira
- Lee Van Cleef as Don Sergio Danielo Christophoro (Last appearing film role)
- Shawn Weatherly as Petra Christopher / Peter
- Craig Gardner as H.H. Christopher
- Liz Torres as Rosa "Big Rosa", Prostitute
- Russel Savadier as Miguel, Juan Luis' Sidekick
- John Hussey as Sir Nigel, Sergio's Lawyer
- Jon Maytham as Flagstead, Nigel's Secretary
- Michael Fisher as Mr. Forstman
- Tony Caprari as Chief Priest / Eavesdropper
- Joe Ribeiro as Police Inspector
- Charles Kinsman as Nunzio
- Nadia Bilchik as Isobella, 2nd Prostitute
- Nobby Clark as "Spur" McGuigan
- Claudia Udy as Marissa, Sergio's Nurse
- Danie Voges as Gomez, Police Inspector's Goon
- Graham Weir as Pirana, Gomez's Sidekick
- Alan Pierce as Mr. Christopher
- Pamela Perry as Luella Christopher, H.H.'s Mother
- Lance Ellington as The Balladeer (voice) (uncredited)
- Sandra Prinsloo (uncredited)
- Marius Weyers (uncredited)
