= The Story of an African Farm (film) =

2004 South African film

- Directed by: David Lister
- Written by: Thandi Brewer; Bonnie Rodini; Olive Schreiner (novel)
- Produced by: Ross Garland; Bonnie Rodini; Cindy Rodkin
- Starring: Richard E. Grant; Armin Mueller-Stahl
- Cinematography: Peter Tischhauser
- Edited by: Josh Galvin
- Music by: J.B. Arthur
- Distributed by: Freestyle Releasing (US)
- Release date: 8 October 2004
- Running time: 97 minutes
- Countries: United States; South Africa
- Language: English

The Story of an African Farm, released in the United States as Bustin' Bonaparte: The Story of an African Farm, is a 2004 South African film directed by David Lister and based on the 1883 novel of the same name by South African author Olive Schreiner.

== Plot ==
The setting is a farm on the slopes of a Karoo Kopje, South Africa, during the 1870s. Fat Tant Sannie (Karin van der Laag) looks after her charges, the sweet Em (Anneke Weidemann) and the independent Lyndall (Kasha Kropinski), with a strict Biblical hand - it was Em's father's dying wish. Gentle Otto (Armin Mueller-Stahl), the farm manager, runs the farm and cares for Waldo, his son. Waldo (Luke Gallant) is bright, and busy building a model of a sheep-shearing machine that he hopes will make them all rich. Things change when the sinister, eccentric Bonaparte Blenkins (Richard E. Grant) with bulbous nose and chimney pot hat arrives. Their childhood is disrupted by the bombastic Irishman who claims blood ties with Wellington and Queen Victoria and so gains uncanny influence over the girls' stepmother, Tant Sannie.

== Cast ==
- Armin Mueller-Stahl as Otto
- Richard E. Grant as Bonaparte Blenkins
- Karin van der Laag as Tant Sannie
- Kasha Kropinski as Lyndall
- Luke Gallant .as Waldo
- Anneke Weidemann as Em
- Elriza Swanepoel as Trana
- Nichol Petersen as Tant Sannie's Maid
- Chris-Jan Steenkamp as Sheep Shearer
