= Sandra Prinsloo =

South African actress (born 1947)

- Born: 15 September 1947 (age 79); Union of South Africa
- Education: University of Pretoria
- Occupation: Actress
- Known for: Her role as Kate Thompson in The Gods Must Be Crazy

Sandra Prinsloo (born 15 September 1947), also known as Sandra Prinzlow, is a South African actress best known internationally for her role as Kate Thompson in the 1980 film The Gods Must Be Crazy. Prinsloo has also appeared in numerous South African television, film, and stage productions.

== Early life and career ==
Prinsloo has stated that she never expected to become an actress.

"I was a ballet dancer from a very early age and I remember that I occasionally ushered at the Breytenbach Theatre in Pretoria when I was in high school. That’s the first time I came into contact with professional stage acting, but I never thought I’d be an actress . . . . I think I was far too shy in those days to ever think I could be an actress. So it wasn’t like I had this great big burning passion to become an actress, not at all. I preferred an academic life, in a way. When I went to university, I thought that was going to be what I was going to do".

Prinsloo matriculated from the Afrikaanse Hoër Meisieskool and then completed her B.A. honours in drama at the University of Pretoria. Soon after, she became a member of the Performing Arts Council Transvaal acting company. "One night we were performing and it was as if something absolutely magical happened. It was as if a golden net was cast down. Everything was magical that evening and everybody felt it in the cast ... It was something enchanting that happens in the exchange of the energy between the audience and the actors".

Prinsloo has said that after that night, she realised that acting was her calling.

== Film career ==
In addition to her well-known role in The Gods Must Be Crazy, Prinsloo has had major roles in Target of an Assassin (1979), Quest for Love (1988), Die Prins van Pretoria (1992), Soweto Green (1995), 'n Paw Paw Vir My Darling (2015), Twee Grade van Moord (2016).

== Television career ==
Prinsloo was in the original cast of Egoli: Place of Gold, South Africa's first soap opera. For many years, she hosted her own talk show, RaakPraat met Sandra, on South Africa television. She has also conducted a series of interviews with personalities and celebrities for South African TV, Sandra Op 'n Drafstap.

Prinsloo has acted in a number of South African television series and movies throughout her career, including Erfsondes (2012); Hartland (2011); Known Gods (2005); Saints, Sinners, and Settlers (1999); and Konings (1991) among others.

== Theatre career ==
Prinsloo has performed in more than 100 different productions, often playing leading roles in works by South African and international dramatists.

In 1985, Prinsloo and fellow actor John Kani caused a South African audience walk-out when performing the play Miss Julie by August Strindberg. In the title role, Prinsloo played a white woman seducing a black man. The play marked the first on-stage occurrence of a black man kissing a white woman under the Apartheid regime.

The play's producer, Bobby Heaney, speculated that the walk-out was "part of a well planned campaign by conservative whites". Both Kani and Prinsloo had to be escorted into the parking lot after each performance of Miss Julie, as there was fear that the actors would be attacked by "enraged right-wingers". Prinsloo reportedly received obscene hate mail and both received death threats.

When interviewed in 2014 for the 21 Icons Project, a series of short films about South Africans "who have shaped the world around them", Prinsloo commented that "I thought [the play] would cause a stir, but I didn't think it would cause a minor revolution. People were very small-minded and I suppose you live in a bit of a fool's paradise when you’re an actor".

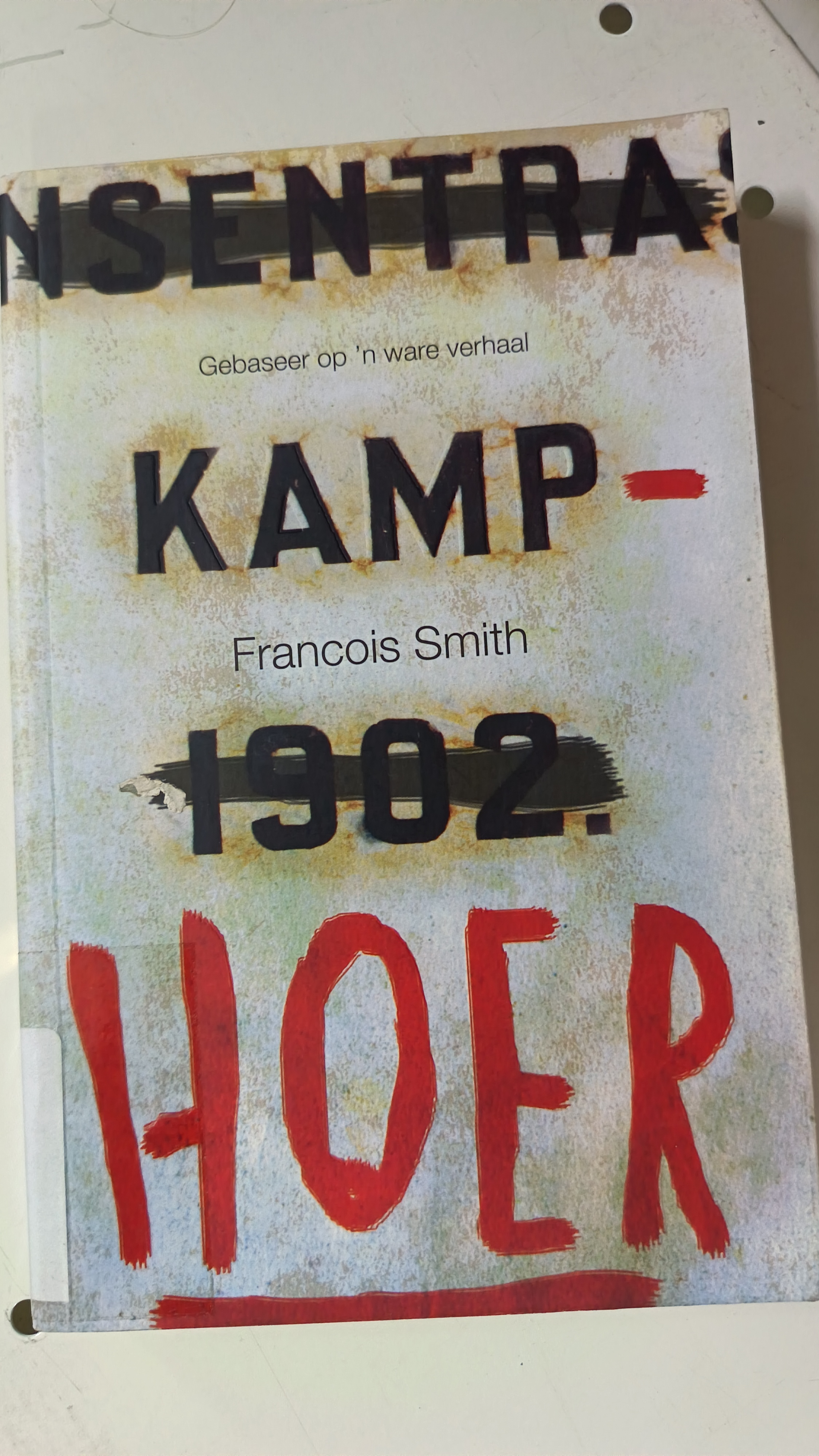
Kamp Hoer boek, by Francois Smith

The actors later performed the play at the Edinburgh Festival. In 1986, Heaney directed a TV movie of the play for Swedish and Finnish television, which starred both Prinsloo and Kani.

Prinsloo returned to the Edinburgh Festival in 2012 with The Sewing Machine, an English-language translation of the Afrikaans-language play, Die Naaimasjien. In the 2000s, Prinsloo appeared on the South African stage in productions of Oskar en die Pienk Tannie; Janneman; Nag, Ma (Night Mother); and Liefde, Anna.

In October 2015, Prinsloo portrayed South African journalist, Jani Allan in Jani at the Aardklop festival. In 2020 Prinsloo performed a one woman show, Kamphoer – die verhaal van Susan Nell, based on the novel ‘Kamphoer’ written by Francois Smit and the non-fiction publication ‘The Boer Whore’ by Nico Moolman.

== Awards ==
In 2013, Prinsloo received the ACT Lifetime Achievement Award for Theatre. The awards are offered annually by the Arts and Culture Trust (ACT) of South Africa in order to "honour arts professionals whose extraordinary careers have had a profound and lasting impact on arts, culture and heritage, and whose lifetime achievements have contributed significantly to the enrichment of cultural life in South Africa".

In 2014, Prinsloo was the recipient of a national order by the South African government, the Order of Ikhamanga in silver, for those whose outstanding work has benefited South Africa. National orders are bestowed on South Africa's Freedom Day. The orders celebrate human achievement in various fields, honouring men and women who have left definitive footprints in both the struggle for liberation and in building a better South Africa.

In 2018, Prinsloo was the recipient of a Lifetime Achievement Award from the Naledi Theatre Awards. The awards are offered annually by the Naledi Theatre Awards Committee.

== Education ==
Prinsloo matriculated from the Afrikaanse Hoër Meisieskool. She holds the degree B.A. (Honours) from the University of Pretoria.

== Partial filmography ==
- A Kind of Madness (2025)
- The Seagull (Die Seemeeu) (2019)
- Twee Grade van Moord (2016)
- 'n Paw-Paw vir My Darling (2015)
- Soweto Green (1995)
- The Prince of Pretoria (1993)
- In the Name of Blood (1990)
- Quest for Love (1988)
- Thieves of Fortune (1988)
- Jewel of the Gods (1989)
- The Outcast (1984)
- Claws (1982)
- The Gods Must Be Crazy (1980)
- Listen to My Story (1976)
- Target of an Assassin (1976)
- No Gold for a Dead Diver (1974) – as Sandra Prinzlow
- Love Nights in the Taiga (1967)
