= Barney Barnato (TV series) =

- Genre: Adventure
- Created by: David Lister
- Starring: Sean Taylor; Graham Hopkins; Lyn Hooker; Richard Cox
- Country of origin: South Africa
- Original language: English
- No. of episodes: 7

Production
- Running time: 48 minutes

Original release
- Network: SABC
- Release: 9 April 1990

Barney Barnato is a television mini-series based on the life of British diamond mining magnate Barney Barnato. It was produced in South Africa, West Germany, and the United Kingdom. It was first shown on television in South Africa by the South African Broadcasting Corporation on 9 April 1990.

== Plot ==
A young and impoverished Barney Barnato emigrated from England to South Africa in 1870. There he first works at a circus and falls in love with and later marries Fanny. The ambitious Barnato uses his business acumen to establish himself within the rough business world of diamond mining and trading in Kimberley. Often crossing paths with the equally ambitious Cecil Rhodes. During this time he becomes one of the richest men in the British Empire. He has to defend himself and his fortune from a number of competitors. When Barnato opposes Rhodes (now Prime Minister of the Cape Colony) in his efforts to start a war with the Boer Republics Barnato becomes the victim of a plot involving one of his nephews. The series ends with Barnato being thrown overboard a cruise ship and his death being portrayed to the public as a suicide.

== Cast ==
- Sean Taylor as Barney Barnato
- Graham Hopkins as Cecil John Rhodes
- Vinette Ebrahim as Fanny Bees
- Richard Cox as Harry Barnato
- Amadeus August as Schneider
- Manfred Seipold as Mr. Sonnenberg
- Claudia Demarmels as Mrs. Schneider
- Fiona Ramsay as Lily
- Clive Scott as Payne
