= Chasing Your Tomorrows =

Studio album by Candîce
- Released: January 17, 2003
- Studios: Urban Rhythm Factory, Australia
- Length: 42:04
- Label: Musketeer Records
- Producers: Clive Young; Brian O Shea

Chasing Your Tomorrows is the debut studio album by South African singer Candîce. It was released in 2003.

== Track listing ==
1. "Hello"
2. "It's The Music"
3. "I Know What I Like"
4. "While You're Here"
5. "Disappointed"
6. "Dumb"
7. "The Sweetest Kiss"
8. "Chasing Your Tomorrows"
9. "You're Really Here"
10. "You Don't Know What Love Is For"
11. "Unexperienced"

== Singles ==
- "Hello" - November 2002 (South Africa), 21 June 2004 (UK)

Musketeer Records - Sony Music, Produced by Clive Young, Marty Frederickson and Jeremy Wheatley
UK Promo CD Track listing

- "Hello" - (C. Young, R. Cain) - 3:48
