= Booij =

Booij or Booy is a Dutch surname. It can be of patronymic origin, derived from short forms of the Germanic names Bodo or Boudewijn, or it can be an occupational surname, referring to a bode ("messenger" or "constable"). The form "De Booij" is only occupational of origin. The surname can be spelled with an ij digraph or a "y", though usually the latter abroad. The name "Van Booij" or "Van Booy" does not exist in the Low Countries. In 2007 the number of Booij or Booy name carriers in The Netherlands were 2649.

- Foeke Booy (born 1962), Dutch football striker and manager
- Geert Booij (born 1947), Dutch linguist, creator of construction morphology
- James Marnix de Booij, later Jim de Booy (1885–1969), Dutch politician, Minister of Defense 1944–46
- Minke Booij (born 1977), Dutch field hockey player
- Simon Van Booy (born 1975), British-born American writer
- Theodoor de Booij, later de Booy, (1882–1919), Dutch-born American archaeologist, discoverer of the extinct DeBooy's rail

== See also ==
- Booi, Afrikaans surname, probably of the same origin
