= The Sorcerer's Apprentice (2001 film) =

Film directed by David Lister

- Directed by: David Lister
- Written by: Johann Wolfgang von Goethe (story); Brett Morris (script)
- Based on: The Sorcerer's Apprentice by Johann Wolfgang von Goethe
- Produced by: Peter H. Matthews, Elizabeth Matthews
- Starring: Kelly LeBrock; Robert Davi
- Cinematography: Buster Reynolds
- Music by: Mark Thomas
- Production company: Peakviewing Productions
- Release date: 2001
- Running time: 89 minutes
- Country: United Kingdom
- Language: English

The Sorcerer's Apprentice is a 2001 British film directed by David Lister and starring Robert Davi and Kelly LeBrock.

The film was made in South Africa but is set in England.

== Outline ==
The wicked sorceress Morgana (Kelly LeBrock) plans to rule the world, but for fourteen hundred years all her efforts have failed. Once in every century, she tries to recover Fingall's magic staff and unite it with a magic stone in the possession of the wizard Merlin, a combination of devastating power. Merlin, now an elderly man living under the name of Milner (Robert Davi), still has the stone.

Milner befriends a neighbour, a fourteen-year-old boy called Ben Clark (Byron Taylor), who has recently migrated from South Africa, and sees that he has the same scar as a bearer of Fingall's staff that he had known in the 6th century. Ben is fascinated by magic, and Milner begins to teach him to be a magician. The staff of Fingall is now on display in a museum of which Ben's father (Greg Melvill-Smith) is the curator. As Morgana enters the story, Ben has to make his own choice between good and evil.

== Cast ==
- Kelly LeBrock as Morgana
- Robert Davi as Milner / Merlin
- Byron Taylor as Ben Clark
- Anne Power as Carol Clark
- Greg Melvill-Smith as Mike Clark
- Dale Cutts as Fingall
- Gideon Emery as Sly
- Martin Le Maitre as Filo
- Clinton Dooley as Mark Evans
- Roxanne Burger as Nicole
- Terence Reis as First Knight
- Lawrence Joffe as Second Knight
- Sean Taylor as schoolteacher
