= A Case of Murder =

2004 film directed by Clive Morris

- U.S. poster
- Directed by: Clive Morris
- Written by: Clive Morris
- Produced by: Felix Meyburgh Jr.; Clive Morris; Richard Harry Nosworthy
- Starring: Steve Hofmeyr; Candice Hillebrand; Gideon Emery
- Cinematography: Felix Meyburgh Jr.
- Edited by: Felix Meyburgh Jr.
- Release date: 2004
- Country: South Africa
- Language: English

A Case of Murder is a 2004 action/crime/thriller film which had its release in South Africa on 2 July 2004.

It was based on a true story of a hideous murder, where the victim's body was disposed of in a suitcase.

The film was dedicated to the memory of veteran actor Ramalao Makhene, who died shortly after shooting was completed.

== Plot ==
Two brothers, together with one of their wives, plot to kill the old man they live with and steal his pension. When they try to dispose of the body, things start to go horribly wrong.

== Cast ==
- Steve Hofmeyr as Jack Norkem
- Candice Hillebrand as Colleen Norkem
- Gideon Emery as Eric Norkem
- Anthony Fridjohn as Uncle Angel
- Ben Kruger as Bushy
- Ramolao Makhene as Alpheus
- Clare Marshall as Gerty
- Nicky Rebello as Sergeant Corrie
