= Candîce Hillebrand =

Candice Hillebrand
- Also known as: Candîce
- Born: 19 January 1977 (age 49); Johannesburg, Republic of South Africa
- Genres: Pop; pop-country; valzer
- Occupations: Singer-songwriter, actress
- Years active: 1988–present
- Label: Musketeer Records

Candice Hillebrand (also known as Candîce) (born 19 January 1977 in Johannesburg, South Africa) is a South African-born actress and singer-songwriter. She has also worked as a presenter and model. She is known for playing Nina Williams in the 2009 Tekken live-action movie, based on the popular video game series, Tekken.

== Career ==
Hillebrand's on-screen career started early in life by hosting South African children's television channel, KTV, at the age of 13. Hillebrand went on to appear in numerous commercials and has acted in both TV and film. In 2002, she signed with Musketeer Records and released her debut album, Chasing Your Tomorrows in 2003. She has also appeared in Maxim magazine.

In 2008, Hillebrand was offered the role of Nina Williams, a character in the film adaptation of the popular video game series, Tekken.

== Discography ==
=== Albums ===
- Chasing Your Tomorrows – (2003)

=== Singles ===
- "Hello" – (2002)

== Filmography ==
- Act of Piracy – Tracey Andrews (1988)
- Accidents – Rebecca Powers (1988)
- Tyger, Tyger Burning Bright (1989)
- The Adventures of Sinbad – Deanna (1998)
- The Legend of the Hidden City – Kari (1999)
- Falling Rocks (2000)
- Othello: A South African Tale – Desdemona (2004)
- A Case of Murder – Colleen Norkem (2004)
- Beauty and the Beast – Ingrid (2005)
- Tekken – Nina Williams (2009)
- Blood of the Vikings (2014)
