= Nico Moolman =

South African historian and writer (1948–2026)

- Born: Nico Moolman; 15 January 1948; South Africa
- Died: 25 August 2025 (aged 77); Utrecht,Kwazulu-Natal
- Other name: Zembe malaisha "The Axe That Gathers"
- Occupations: Historian; Museum curator; Author; poet; musician
- Notable work: The Boer Whore

Nico Moolman (15 January 1948 – 25 August 2025) was a South African writer, amateur historian, and cultural collector. He is best known for his historical research on the Anglo-Boer War and as the author of the book The Boer Whore, which served as the direct inspiration for the acclaimed Afrikaans novel and stage production, Kamphoer.

== Early life and career ==
Moolman lived and worked in the Vaal Triangle for the greater part of his life, where for many years he worked at Iscor—later known as Mittal—in Vanderbijlpark. Despite his corporate career, he harbored a lifelong passion for history, with a particular focus on the Anglo-Boer War 1899–1902. Over the course of several decades, he dedicated himself to collecting, preserving, and digitizing historical photographs, glass negatives, and archival documents, many of which he later donated to the Bloemfontein Archives.

== Literary contribution and The Boer Whore ==
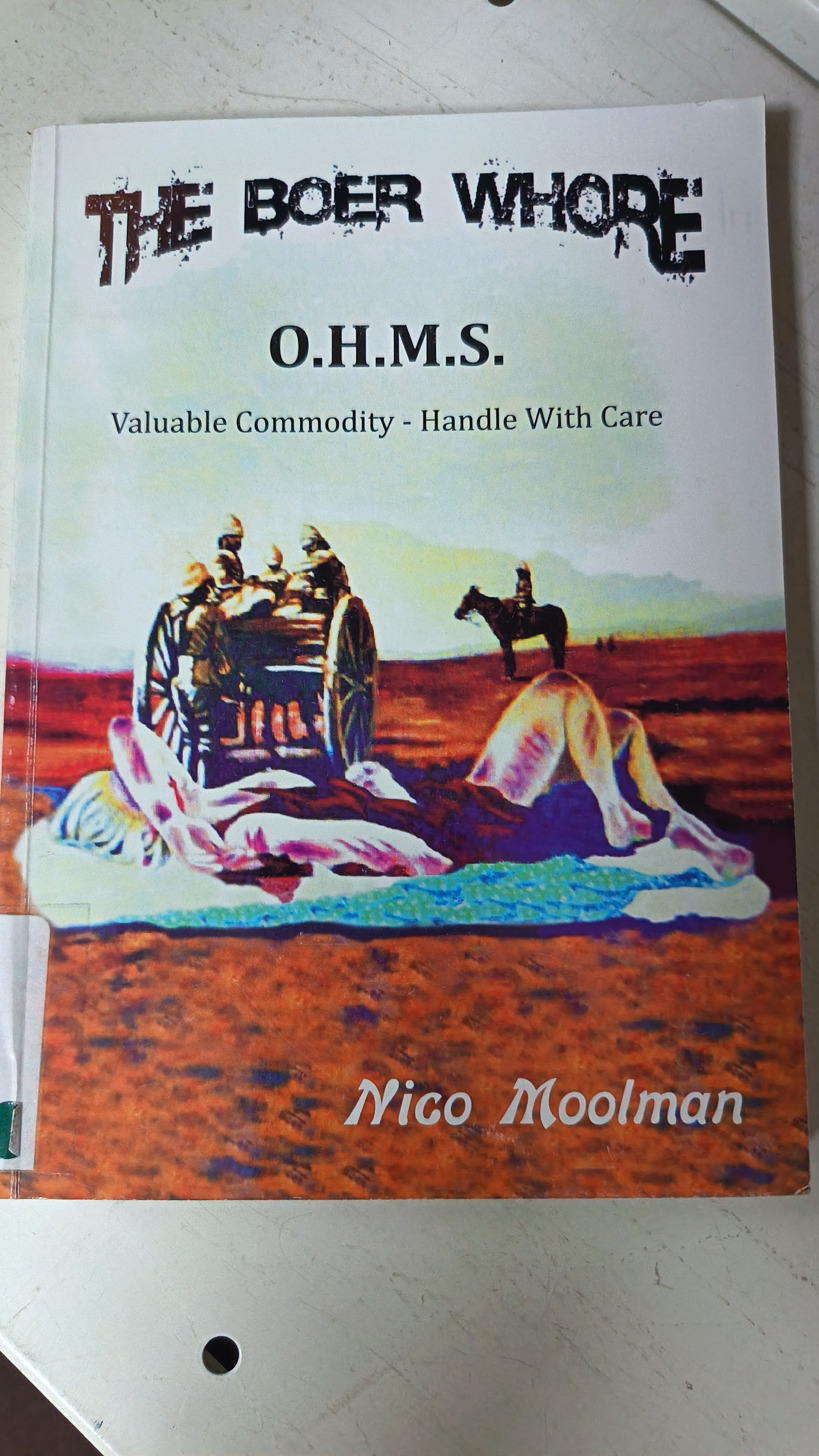
The Boer Whore, by Nico Moolman

During his lifetime, Moolman wrote more than 16 books, most of which were self-published. His best-known work is the historical documentary narrative The Boer Whore published in (2012).

During his archival research, Moolman came across the true and tragic story of Susan Nell, a young girl who was raped by British officers and left for dead in the Winburg concentration camp during the Anglo-Boer War. However, she survived after a Basotho couple found and cared for her in a cave; she eventually traveled to Europe and became one of the world's first female psychiatrists. This historical account later served as the basis for Francois Smith's debut novel Kamphoer (Tafelberg), as well as the highly successful one-woman show of the same name starring Sandra Prinsloo.

== Buskruit en Laventel Plaasmuseum ==
Moolman and his wife, Naomi (whom he married in 1970), later settled on the farm Cesaréa, just outside Utrecht in KwaZulu-Natal. There, he ran his own house museum, named the Buskruit en Laventel Plaasmuseum (known in English as Cordite and Cologne). The museum houses a massive collection of historical cultural treasures, military plaques, and Africana.

In March 2021 Moolman was honored in Utrecht by the Russian ambassador to South Africa, Ilya Rogachev, for his extensive research into the historical ties between the Boers and the Russians who fought on the side of the Boer republics during the Anglo-Boer War.

=== Mysoektog documentary ===
In 2021 Moolman,Wessel Mostert, Tumelo Mokoena, Piet Lombard, Theo Molebatsi, Twin Mosia, Leon Meyer, and Dawie Fourie took a horse-cart journey across South Africa, starting in Vereeniging, Gauteng, and passing through different towns in the Free State before ending up in Utrecht, KwaZulu-Natal province. The team filmed a documentary called My Soektog using a Cape cart, including six horses, and reenacted how traveling was done in the old days.

== Death ==
Moolman passed away in Utrecht on 25 August 2025 at the age of 77, shortly after finalizing his last poetry collection, Amper daar.

== Selected bibliography ==
- Kuier in 'n Plaaskombuis (2005)
- South Africa at a Canter: A Cultural Rhapsody.
- The Boer Whore (2012)
- Dankie, Generaal: Op die spoor van 'n oorlogspeurder
- Karrenmelk vir Ta Nonnie (2015)
- Sij
- Die Pienk Traaisiekel.
- Uit Ouma se Uitsetkist
- Die groot Kwilt
- Amper daar (Digbundel, 2025)
