= David Lister (director) =

Film and TV director

- Citizenship: South African
- Occupations: Film and Television Director
- Notable work: The Legend of the Hidden City; The Last Leprechaun; Soweto Green

David Lister is a South African-born film and television director, now residing in Australia.

David Lister grew up on a farm in Mpumalanga Province, South Africa. He trained as a painter and sculptor in Pretoria before being employed as a scene painter, set designer and head of the props department at the Performing Arts Council in Transvaal. After a brief period as a documentary cameraman at SABC TV, he departed to the UK and studied at the London Film School 1972–1974. He then returned to South Africa to work as a director in the film and television industry.

Around 2005, he moved to Australia.

== Selected filmography ==
- 1984 – River Horse Lake
- 1983 – My Friend Angelo (TV period drama)
- 1987 – John Ross: An African Adventure
- 1988 – Barney Barnato (TV series about the South African mine mogul Barney Barnato)
- 1990 – The Rutanga Tapes (also known as Desert Chase)
- 1993 – Oh Shucks! Here Comes UNTAG (also known as Kwagga Strikes Back)
- 1991 – Konings (TV drama)
- 1994 – Where Angels Tread (TV drama)
- 1995 – Soweto Green
- 1996–1998 – The Legend of the Hidden City (TV series)
- 1997 – Panic Mechanic
- 1998 – The Last Leprechaun
- 1999 – Dazzle
- 2001 – The Meeksville Ghost
- 2001 – Askari
- 2001 – The Sorcerer's Apprentice
- 2002 – Pets
- 2003 – Beauty and the Beast
- 2004 – The Story of an African Farm (also known as Bustin' Bonaparte)
- 2005–2006 – Known Gods (TV series)
- 2009 – Malibu Shark Attack (TV film)
- 2009 – Beauty and the Beast
