= Allen Booi =

South African actor (1943-2020)

- Born: 1943
- Died: 20 July 2020 (aged 77); Johannesburg, South Africa
- Occupation: Actor
- Years active: 1987–2020
- Children: 2

Allen Booi (1943 – 20 July 2020) was a South African actor. He was best known for his roles in the series Tsha Tsha and After Nine.

== Career ==
In 1988, Booi made his film debut with Mercenary Fighters directed by Riki Shelach. He also appeared in the films Diamond in the Rough and Act of Piracy. The following year in 1989, Booi made his television debut in Inkom' Edla Yodwa and appeared in the films In the Name of Blood and The Evil Below. He went on to play Gagashe in the series Ubambo Lwami.

In 2003, Booi joined the cast of the SABC 1 drama series Tsha Tsha as the character Mike, a role he played until 2006. In the meantime, he made supporting and guest appearances in series such as Zero Tolerance, Zone 14 and After 9. Then in 2007, he starred as Godfrey Xaba in the SABC1 miniseries After Nine.

Booi had guest roles in the television series Generations, A Place Called Home, Muvhango, Isidingo and The Queen. His other notable television roles came through Mfo Kamkhize, Mongezi, Sdididi, Odessa, Phindi, 14th Floor, Getting it Right, Timber, Inxhaki Ka Sam, Ubambo Lwami, Khululeka, Going Up, Soul City, Backstage, and Mponeng. In July 2020, before his death, he was supposed to go to Cape Town to start shooting for a role.

== Personal life ==
Booi was a Catholic. In 2019, he became ill due to a mild heart attack. He died on 20 July 2020 at the age of 77 in Johannesburg at his residence. He was survived by his wife, Cathy and two children.

== Filmography ==
=== Film ===
Year	Title	Role	Notes
1988	Mercenary Fighters	Sgt. Obote	
1988	Diamond in the Rough	Rory	
1988	Act of Piracy	George Chibanda	
1989	In the Name of Blood	Coroner	
1989	The Evil Below	Father Dasard	
1990	The Sandgrass People	Thomas	
2014	The Blanket	Mr. Ntombeni	
2018	Looking for love	Mr. Dube	

=== Television ===
Year	Title	Role	Notes
1989	Inkom' Edla Yodwa		
1989	Vleuels	Josef	
1994	Dark Desires: Thelma	Lt. Friemans	Television film
2003	Tsha Tsha	Mike	
2004	Zero Tolerance	Pule Marafe	
2005	Zone 14	Bra Zakes	
2007	After 9	Godfrey Xaba	
	Generations		Guest
2009	A Place Called Home		Guest
2009	Society	Senior Pastor	
2009	Wild at Heart	Bill	
2010	Intersexions	Priest	
2011	Intsika	Chief Zamokhanyo	
2011	90 Plein Street	Pastor Jonas	
	Muvhango		Guest
2012	Room 9	Felokwake	
2013	Zabalaza	Richard	
2013	Isibaya	Mofokeng	
	Isidingo	Muzi	
2015	Jozi Streets	Oom Piet	
2016	Igazi	King Mbangatha	
2018	The Queen	Judge	
2018	Umqhele		Television film
2021	Dead Places	Daniel	
