= Roberta Durrant =

South African sitcom producer (born 1951)

- Born: Roberta Durrant; 1951 (age 74–75)
- Education: University of Stellenbosch (B.A.)
- Occupations: Actress, director, producer
- Years active: 1970s – present
- Known for: Drama and film producer
- Notable work: Madam & Eve; Stokvel; Ring of Lies; S'gudi Snaysi; Fishy Feshuns; Home Affairs
- Spouse: Uwe Jansch
- Awards: Two Lifetime Achievement Awards

Roberta Durrant (born 1951) is a South African sitcom creator, actress, director, producer and showrunner.

As the founder of Penguin Films, she has been involved in creating and producing numerous television series and films that reflect South Africa's diverse cultures and histories. She was described as 'Mama of Comedy' in a 2015 News24 article.

== Early life and education ==
Durrant graduated with a BA in Drama from Stellenbosch University in 1971. She majored in drama and English. During her university years, she was a member of the Gisela Taeger-Berger Modern Dance Group. Her early career included acting and directing in theatre, both in South Africa and London, where she collaborated with notable figures like Steven Berkoff and directed award-winning plays such as Paradise is Closing Down and Don Juan at the Edinburgh Festival.

== Career ==
=== Television ===
Durrant has been a pivotal figure in South African television, creating and producing several long-running, award-winning series. Her notable works include Madam & Eve, Stokvel, Ring of Lies, S'gudi Snaysi and Fishy Feshuns. She also produced the Emmy-nominated series Home Affairs, which delved into the interconnected lives of South African women. In recent years, she has continued to shape the television landscape with telenovelas like Skemergrond and Diepe Waters, and the Showmax series Mince Jou Hare.

=== Film ===
Durrant's filmography includes directing and producing feature films that have garnered international acclaim. Her 2013 film Felix won several international awards and was showcased at various children's film festivals. In 2017, she directed Krotoa, a historical drama about a young Khoi woman who became an interpreter for Jan van Riebeeck. The film sparked discussions on colonialism and identity and won multiple international awards, including Best Film at the Harlem International Film Festival and the Montreal International Black Film Festival.

== Selected works ==
=== Television series ===
- S'gudi Snaysi
- Madam & Eve
- Stokvel
- Home Affairs
- Zokhulu and Partners
- Ring of Lies
- Montana
- Izingane Zobaba
- Shreds and Dreams
- Saints and Sinners
- Z'bondiwe
- Isikizi
- Forced Love
- Going Up
- About Us
- SOS
- Fishy Feshuns
- Going Up Again
- Mazinyo dot Q
- Diepe Waters
- Arendsvlei
- Skemergrond
- Mince Jou Hare
- Projek Dina

=== Feature films ===
- Felix (2013)
- Krotoa (2017)
- Love, Lies and Hybrids (2021)
- Pinky Pinky (2020)
- Herb & Moon (2021)
- Inside Out (1998)
- Skilpoppe
- Ingoma

== Awards and honor ==
- Lifetime Achievement Award, National Film and Video Foundation of South Africa (2012)
- Golden Plumes Award for 30-year contribution to South African Broadcast and Television Industry (2006)
- Lifetime Achievement Award at Silwerskermfees (2024)
- International Emmy Awards nominations for Home Affairs and Sokhulu and Partners
- Golden Rose Award (Bronze) for Madam & Eve at Rose d'Or Festival in Switzerland (2002)
- Runner-up in International Emmy Awards for Stokvel (2004)
- Multiple SAFTA awards including Best Ensemble TV Comedy, Best Editing for Drama, Best Made for TV Movie, Best Children's Programme, Best Art Direction, and Best Editing

== Mentorship and advocacy ==
Beyond her creative endeavors, Durrant is committed to mentoring emerging talent in the industry. She has trained and upskilled numerous writers, directors, editors and producers, emphasizing the importance of diversity and inclusion in storytelling. Her mentorship has helped launch the careers of several notable South African creatives.
