= Danie Brits =

South African professional wrestler (1965–2020)

Personal information
- Born: 3 March 1965 Johannesburg, South Africa
- Died: 3 September 2020 Johannesburg, South Africa

Professional wrestling career
- Ring name(s): Danie 'The Legend' Britz; Danie Britz; Tornado I The Masked Tornado
- Billed height: 6 ft 0 in (1.83 m)
- Billed weight: 235 lb (107 kg)
- Billed from: Johannesburg, South Africa
- Debut: 1983
- Retired: 2015

Danie Brits was a South African professional wrestler and former South African Heavyweight Champion, known for his work in many of South Africa's major promotions in the past and for his 1980s stint as The Masked Tornado.

== Career ==
=== Early career ===
Danie Brits was an accomplished amateur wrestler and judoka before entering professional wrestling. Prior to the 1990s, doing professional wrestling and amateur wrestling at the same time in South Africa was forbidden. Due to his devotion to both sports and being one of the top amateur wrestling competitors in the country, Brits wrestled under a mask upon his professional wrestling debut in 1983, going by the names Tornado and The Masked Tornado.

=== Bronco Universal Promotions/Interworld Wrestling Promotions (1983–92) ===
Danie Brits made his ring debut in 1983 for Bronco Universal Promotions which was operated by legendary promoter Bull Hefer. On 28 November 1987, Danie Brits challenged unsuccessfully for the World Middleweight Title against Gama Singh. On 21 September 1989, Danie Brits teamed up with Danie Voges for the first time in over three years to take on Munro and Big Ox Baker at the Portuguese Hall for Interworld Wrestling Promotions. He won the South African Heavyweight Title from Danie Voges in June 1990, becoming the sixth champion in the title's history. Just prior to winning the championship he unmasked and started using his real name. The Tornado mask and gimmick was passed on to Steve Debbes, who became Tornado II.

=== All Stars Wrestling/International Wrestling Federation (1993–2004) ===
On 12 April 1993, he defeated Gama Singh. On 21 May 1994, Danie Brits teamed up with Giant Warrior who was his arch-rival at the time to defeat Gama Singh and Danie Voges in a tag team match. On 22 July 1994, Danie Brits teamed up with Danie Voges, losing to the American Wrecking Crew of Robbie Rage and Mike Fury at the Sun City Superbowl in an inter-promotional supercard. In September, 1995, Danie Brits received an injury to the eye after having an object thrown at him by a spectator in his All Stars Wrestling match with Giant Warrior, after which he was forced to have a major operation. On 20 September 1996, Danie Brits wrestled the American Man Mountain Rock at an All Stars Wrestling show promoted by Paul Lloyd, father of WWE star Justin Gabriel. On 29 November 1997, Danie Brits took on and lost to Rage at the famed Orient Theatre in East London. On 30 March 1999, Danie Brits faced Gama Singh at the Orient Theatre in what would be their very last encounter.

=== World Wrestling Professionals (2004–07) ===
In 2004, he joined World Wrestling Professionals and was billed Danie "The Legend" Brits. He took part in the first and second seasons of WWP Thunderstrike, which was airing on national television in South Africa. He teamed up with his nephew Ananzi and won the WWP Tag Team World Title. During a house show in Durban they caused a legitimate riot and were forced out of the building by police escort. Danie Brits failed to show up at one of the second season tapings due to illness and was thus relieved of his title status. In 2007, Danie Brits retired after a 20-year career in professional wrestling.

== Personal life ==
Danie Brits is the uncle of World Wrestling Professionals wrestler Ananzi and is the half-brother of former tag team partner and rival Danie Voges. In July 2009, he was honoured at an African Punishment Wrestling Association event at Danie van Zyl Recreation Centre for his achievements in South African professional wrestling. He donated the original Tornado mask to the promotion's academy.

He died on 3 September 2020 at 55.

== Championships and accomplishments ==
- All Stars Wrestling/International Wrestling Federation
  - IWF Heavyweight Title
  - IWF Tag Team Titles (w/ Danie Voges)
- Bronco Universal Promotions
  - South African Heavyweight Title
- Universal Wrestling Federation
  - UWF South African Heavyweight Title
  - UWF Middleweight Title
- World Confederation of Wrestling
  - WCA World Title
- World Wrestling Professionals
  - WWP Tag Team World Title (w/ Ananzi)
- Pro Wrestling Illustrated
  - PWI ranked him #302 of the 500 best singles wrestlers in 1994
