= Vuyelwa Booi =

South African actress singer and television presenter (born 1981)

- Born: Vuyelwa Booi; 6 April 1981 (age 45); Soweto, South Africa
- Education: Potchefstroom High School for Girls; Midrand University
- Occupations: actress, singer and television presenter
- Years active: 1994–present

Vuyelwa Booi (born 6 April 1981) is a South African actress, singer and television presenter. She is best known for the roles in the films Chappie, Swartwater and Sink.

== Personal life ==
Booi was born on 6 April 1981 in Soweto, Johannesburg, South Africa. She attended primary school at the Dominican Convent in Belgravia, Johannesburg. Then she completed her high school life in Potchefstroom High School for Girls and matriculated in 1998. During school ages, she started singing in the choir and performed in the school plays. She completed an associate degree in Theatre Arts at Midrand University, which is currently known as Midrand Graduate Institute.

In 2015, she opened about that she suffered from depression for many years.

== Career ==
In 1997, she was selected to the North West Youth Choir and made a tour in Europe in July. During this tour, she was able to perform in five countries, participated in competitions as well as choir festivals. In 2000, she got the opportunity to perform a lead role in an Industrial play at the Market Theatre. In 2001, she joined with the cast of the SABC2 soap opera 7de Laan. In the soapie, she played the role as "Alyce Morapedi" until 2004. In 2005, she moved to New York and studied drama further after enrolled with the New York Film Academy. However, she could not complete the course.

After return to South Africa in December 2005, Vuyelwa joined with a musical play Drumstruck performed off-Broadway. Then in 2006, she made backing vocals for musician Wyclef Jean for the remix of the 2006 FIFA World Cup theme song along with Shakira. After two years, she joined again with the soapie 7de Laan in November 2006. In the meantime, she got the lead role of "Pabi" of the SABC1 youth drama Soul Buddyz season three. Then she made a guest appearance on the SABC2 music game show Noot vir Noot. At that time, she was invited to host the SABC2 lifestyle magazine series Pasella.

In 2010, she replaced Dosto Noge as the host of the SABC2 consumer rights show "Speak Out" for its fourth season. In 2015, she replaced Anele Mdoda as host of the docu-reality series Dream School SA. In the same year, she made her film debut with Hollywood blockbuster Chappie and later played the role "Maria" in the film Sink. In 2017, she joined the cast of Swartwater and played the role "Portia Malefe".

== Filmography ==
| Year | Film | Role | Genre | Ref. |
|---|---|---|---|---|
| 1994 | Soul City | Poppie Langa | TV series | |
| 1998 | Isidingo | Thandi | TV series | |
| 2005 | Soul Buddyz 3 | Pabi | TV series | |
| 2008 | On the Couch | Lulama | TV series | |
| 2008 | 7de Laan | Alyce Morapedi | TV series | |
| 2010 | Intersexions | Sheryl | TV series | |
| 2013 | Geraamtes in die Kas | Dr. Palesa Ramaphosa | TV series | |
| 2013 | Thola | Paballo Mokwena | TV series | |
| 2014 | The Last Doorman | Vuyo | Short film | |
| 2015 | Chappie | Field Reporter | Film | |
| 2015 | Sink | Maria | Film | |
| 2017 | Swartwater | Portia Malefe | TV series | |
| 2018 | iKhaya | Teacher | TV series | |
| 2020 | Inconceivable | Tumi Sejeng | TV series | |
| 2020 | Spoorloos2 | Adjutant Nkonyeni | TV series | |
| 2021 | Hush Money | Grace Dukashe | TV series | |
