= Madam & Eve =

Comic strip

- Logotype
- Illustrator: Rico Schacherl
- Launch date: July 1992

Madam & Eve is a daily comic strip originating in South Africa. The strip, by Stephen Francis and Rico Schacherl, is syndicated in 13 publications and claims a daily readership of over 4 million people. The strip was first published in July 1992, in a black and white weekly format in The Weekly Mail (now the Mail & Guardian) and in a monthly colour format in Living magazine. In 1993 the creators added five daily cartoons, also in black and white. In 2000 Madam & Eve was made into a television sitcom.

== Concept ==
A satirical strip, it started in 1992 and was based around the theme of a middle-class white woman, Gwen Anderson ("Madam"), and her black maid, Eve Sisulu, coming to terms with the new South Africa as the Apartheid era drew to a close. Theirs is a relationship of affectionate squabbling.

Perhaps in the spirit of equality, neither character is portrayed as particularly sympathetic. Madam is always coming up with silly ideas in order to fit in more with the new way of life. Eve meanwhile keeps coming up with ways of obtaining extra cash out of Madam and others.

== Political humor ==
The strip often pokes fun at political figures, both South African and elsewhere in the world (much in the same way, though not as consistently, as the US strip Doonesbury). Past targets have included former South African president Thabo Mbeki, former South African president Jacob Zuma, businessman Schabir Shaik and Winnie Mandela. Further afield, jabs have been directed at US President George W. Bush, Vice President Dick Cheney, Pop star Michael Jackson and UK Prime Minister Tony Blair.

Even Nelson Mandela has been a source of fun. Although he is usually highly regarded both in and out of South Africa, Madam and Eve has treated him no differently from any other politician. For example, when he and Frederik Willem de Klerk jointly won the Nobel Peace Prize in 1993, a series of strips had their lawyers discussing its sharing with Mandela insisting on a 60–40% split on the grounds that he had featured on more magazine covers and Hollywood movies.

== Creators ==
The idea for Madam & Eve originated with Stephen Francis, an American expatriate. The three founding creators of the Madam & Eve strip, Harry Dugmore, Rico Schacherl, and Stephen Francis, first worked together on Laughing Stock, a satirical magazine launched in Johannesburg in 1988. Following the closure of the magazine (after 13 issues), the three worked on other projects in the greeting card division of the same company. That company folded, and the trio launched Madam & Eve in July 1992. Dugmore left the partnership in 2001.

=== Rico Schacherl ===
Known professionally by his first name, Rico is a cartoonist and illustrator living and working in Johannesburg, South Africa. He was born in Austria in 1966. After less-than-successful studies in graphic design and architecture during the late 80s, Rico decided to get a job as a cartoonist.

=== Stephen Francis ===
Stephen Francis, born in the US in 1949, moved to South Africa in 1988 with his then wife, Wendy, whom he met at the South African consulate in New York City. His parents live in New Jersey. The fifth anniversary Madam & Eve book credits many of the strip's original ideas, including the title, to Francis.

=== Harry Dugmore ===
Harry Dugmore, born 1961, was the native South African of the founding group. Harry was described in 2000 as handling all of the business for the partnership. He left Rapid Phase in 2001.

== Main characters ==
Cover of the 2000 Madam & Eve cartoon collection: The Madams are Restless.

=== Madam ===
Gwen Anderson, also known as Madam, is a typical white South African woman. The original "Madam" is loosely based on Stephen Francis' own mother-in-law, also named Gwen. Of her family we have met one son, Eric, and her mother and aunt.

=== Eve ===
Eve Sisulu is Madam's "domestic maintenance assistant." Eve frequently opens a booth selling different goods and services for a side income, and is sometimes found asleep on her ironing board, both deliberate homages to Charles Schulz' Peanuts (Lucy and Snoopy, respectively). When Schulz died, a tribute cartoon appeared showing Eve sleeping on a doghouse and Snoopy sleeping on an ironing board.

=== Mother Anderson ===
The character of Mother Anderson was originally introduced as Abigail ("Mother") Anderson in 1993. The character visited Madam & Eve on a trip from England, and soon disappeared again from the comic strip. Her first appearance was so popular that the character returned in 1994 and has stayed in the comic since, as a permanent character. A twin sister, Edith, was introduced in 1995, but a year after that character's appearance "Mother Anderson" became known as "Edith Anderson," the name which has stuck since. She is well known for her addiction to gin and tonic. She is often referred to as "Gogo" (a South African affectionate term for an older woman) in more recent strips.

=== Thandi Sisulu ===
Thandi Sisulu was introduced in 1994 as Lizeka's baby sister. She has often been "paired" with 80-year-old Mother Anderson. Since Eric and Lizeka no longer appear regularly, Thandi is described, as of 2005, as "Eve's precocious cousin who lives next door."

== Recurring characters ==
=== Eric Anderson ===
Eric Anderson, Gwen's son, was introduced in early 1993 as a college student. The character was allowed to graduate from college a few years later, but remained unemployed. When the character reappears it has been said he had been on a trip to India or Tibet. The illustrator's (real name: Enrico Schacherl) real-life brother's name also happens to be Erich.

=== Lizeka ===
Lizeka was introduced as Eric's college girlfriend in late 1993. Being Zulu, she allowed the writers to explore humour in having an "interracial couple." As of 2005, this character has all but disappeared from the strip.

=== The Mielie Lady ===
Another inspiration of Stephen Francis: Francis would be frequently awoken from naps by a woman street vendor, calling out that she had Mielies (known as ears of corn in the USA & Canada, and maize elsewhere). The writers originally spelled the word "mealies," but settled on "mielies" by 1996. The woman who peddles them past Madam & Eve's house is often paired with Mother Anderson, who often gives chase, wielding a "kattie" (catapult) for having had her nap interrupted.

=== Dr. Kumalo ===
Madam's recurring psychiatrist who appeared as a replacement for the old doctor. When he first appeared she thought he was a witchdoctor.

=== Parktown prawns ===
The parktown prawn is a large King cricket that manages to create regular havoc in Madam's household whenever it appears, due to its repugnant shape and difficulty to kill using normal insecticides.

The prawns in the cartoon behave like university students who are on holiday – insecticide gives them a drug-trip, and they call it 'zol' – a South African slang term for cannabis.

The Prawns have been known to leave a prawn-shaped silhouette in frying pans applied to them to kill them, and to get amusement from scaring the ladies in the Anderson house.

=== Three Guys on the Back of a Bakkie ===
Three enigmatic laborers sitting on the back of a bakkie (pickup truck) often appear in strips which have Madam stuck in traffic. Typically, they do nothing but stare at her with otherwise blank expressions, which drives Madam nuts: "It never fails! For years, wherever I go in traffic, I always end up behind these same three guys on the back of a bakkie!" — from the strip of 2 November 2006.

=== The Dustbin Men ===
Appearing yearly before Christmas, the area's dustbin men are trying to collect their "Christmas bonus" from Madam and Mother Anderson. While they become more and more creative in their efforts by the year, the latter become more and creative in avoiding paying the bonus.

=== Other characters ===
- The "little aliens" occasionally come to earth and to decide whether South Africans have morally developed as a species, if not, they will nuke them.
- The tokoloshes are small creatures from African folklore who try to take the characters away at night if they don't have bricks under their beds.

== Books ==
=== Annual collections ===
1. The Madam & Eve Collection – First published September 1993, reprinted 1999 – ISBN 0-620-17869-8
2. Free at Last – First published 1994 – ISBN 0-14-024833-1
3. All Aboard for the Gravy Train – First published 1995 – ISBN 0-14-025652-0
4. Somewhere over the Rainbow Nation – First published 1996, reprinted 1998 – ISBN 0-14-026420-5
5. Madams Are from Mars, Maids Are from Venus – First published 1997, reprinted 1998 – ISBN 0-14-026656-9
6. Madam & Eve's Greatest Hits: Five Year Anniversary Special Edition – First published 1998 – ISBN 0-14-028241-6
7. It's a Jungle Out There – First published 1998 – ISBN 0-86486-411-6
8. International Maid of Mystery – First published 1999 – ISBN 0-86486-443-4
9. The Madams are Restless – First published 2000 – ISBN 0-620-26306-7
10. Crouching Madam, Hidden Maid – First published 2001 – ISBN 0-620-27931-1
11. Madam & Eve: 10 Wonderful Years – First published 2002 – ISBN 0-620-29248-2
12. The Maidtrix – First published 2003 – ISBN 0-620-30709-9
13. Gin & Tonic for the Soul – First published 2004 – ISBN 0-620-30709-9
14. Desperate Housemaids – First published 2005 – ISBN 0-620-34459-8
15. Madams of the Caribbean – First published 2006 – ISBN 0-620-37052-1
16. Bring me my (new) Washing Machine – First published 2007 – ISBN 978-0-620-39600-4
17. Unplugged – First published 2008 – ISBN 978-0-620-41662-7
18. Strike While the Iron is Hot – First published 2009 – ISBN 978-1-77009-779-7
19. Twilight of the Vuvuzelas – First published 2010 – ISBN 978-1-77009-878-7
20. The Pothole at the End of the Rainbow – First published 2011 – ISBN 978-1-4314-0252-6
21. Twenty – First published 2012 – ISBN 978-1-4314-0451-3
22. Keep Calm and Take Another Tea Break – First published 2013 – ISBN 978-1-4314-0843-6
23. Send in the Clowns – First published 2014 – ISBN 978-1-4314-2031-5
24. Shed Happens – First published October 2015 by Jacana – ISBN 978-1-4314-2270-8
25. Take Us To Your Leader (Note: Pre publication this book was titled Take Me To Your Leader and this variation of the cover design can still erroneously be seen in some places online.) – First published 7 October 2016 by Jacana – ISBN 978-1-4314-2430-6
26. Hadeda La Land – First published 2017 – ISBN 978-1-4314-2567-9
27. The Guptas Ate My Homework – First published 2018 – ISBN 978-1-4314-2732-1
28. The Fourth Domestic Revolution – First published 2019 by Jacana – ISBN 978-1-4314-2940-0
29. Days Of Our Lockdown Lives – First published 20 October 2020 by Jacana – ISBN 978-1-4314-3060-4
30. Family Meeting – First published 2021 by Jacana – ISBN 978-1-4314-3163-2
31. Unmasked – First published 2022 by Jacana – ISBN 978-1-4314-3290-5
32. There's a Blue Light at the End of the Tunnel – First published 2023 by Jacana – ISBN 978-1-4314-3422-0
33. Homework Of National Unity – First published 23 October 2024 by Jacana – ISBN 978-1-4314-3542-5
34. Madam: Impossible - First published 4 November 2025 (Note: The publisher's web site lists the publishing date as October but it was actually released on 4 November 2025.) by Jacana Media – ISBN 9781431436354

=== Special collections ===
1. Has Anyone seen my Vibrating Cellphone? – First printed 2000 – ISBN 0-620-25271-5
2. Madam & Eve's SA Survival Handbook – First printed 2001 – ISBN 0-620-27930-3
3. Mother Anderson's Secret Book of Wit & Wisdom – First printed 2011 – ISBN 978-1-4314-0107-9

The first of these was a special edition produced with Vodacom. The second featured the Madam & Eve characters with text by Gus Silber.

== TV show ==
A thirty-minute live action TV show was produced and shown on South African TV. The TV show appeared on eTV in 2000. In 2002 the show was nominated for the Rose d'Or Competition. The cast consists of

- Val Donald Bell – Gwen "Madam" Anderson
- Tina Jaxa – Eve Sisulu
- Pat Sanders – Gwen's mother. Pat Sanders died in July 2005. The Madam & Eve comic strip dated 27 July 2005 was dedicated to her.
- Joe Mafela – Sol
- Jenny Steyn – Marge, Gwen's neighbour

The show was directed by Mark Graham and produced by Penguin Films.

== International coverage ==
Some art from Madam and Eve has been placed into galleries, such as the exhibit at the Caisa Gallery, Helsinki, Finland, which lasted until 30 June 2005. The comic has also been covered and reviewed internationally, including a New York Times article by Bill Keller, published on 5 April 1993, a Washington Post article by Paul Taylor, France's newspaper Liberation, in 1994, and the international magazine The Economist, in 1997. Their cartoon collection books have been published in Denmark, France and Sweden, and some cartoons are occasionally reprinted in a comics magazine in Norway.

In the run-up to the first free elections in South Africa, the UK Newspaper "The Guardian" (known in the US and elsewhere as the "Manchester Guardian"), ran the strip for several weeks.

Because the comic is available online, and the books are available internationally, the cartoonists have, on occasion, explained some topics to their international readers through their characters. Many of these have been translations, such as mielies being corn or maize, or a "robot" being a traffic light/signal.

== See also ==
- South African comics
