= Beauty and the Beast (2005 film) =

- Directed by: David Lister
- Written by: Paul Anthony
- Produced by: Janet Blandford; Stephen Margolis
- Starring: Jane March; William Gregory Lee; Justin Whalin; David Dukas; Greg Melvill-Smith; Candicé Hillebrand; Marcel Van Heerden; Russel Savadier; Steven van Niekerk; Lee Ann Shepherd; Ron Smerczak; Aubrey Lovett; Etienne Oelofse; Etienne Changuion; Antony Jardin
- Cinematography: Buster Reynolds
- Edited by: Peter Davies
- Music by: Mark Thomas
- Release date: 18 October 2005
- Running time: 90 minutes
- Country: South Africa
- Language: English

Beauty and the Beast (also known as Blood of Beasts) is a 2005 British-South African film which is based on the folktale "Beauty and the Beast" and is set during the time of the Vikings.

== Plot ==
In a land ruled by Vikings, the daughter of King Thorsson: Freya is due to wed one of her father's mightiest clan warriors. Before their engagement is set, the ailing king decides to take one last expedition to Gungnir, a foreboding island that was said to be enchanted by Odin and is rumored to be home to a monstrous beast. Before the clan departs, Freya bargains with Sven that she will only marry him if her father returns safely. He reluctantly agrees, unaware that Freya's heart belongs to that of her childhood friend Agnar, thought to have been lost to the isle.

Upon arriving to the island of Gungnir: Thorsson's army is attacked by the monstrous beast, a gruesome berserker cloaked in the skin of a large brown bear. Sven, looking to usurp Thorsson's throne upon his death, plans to desert him on the island to the mercy of the beast. While a few clan members loyal to Thorsson try to reason with Sven, he takes the surviving clan and sails homeward. Upon his arrival back home, Sven declares himself the clan's new leader much to the disdain of Freya who despairs over her father's disappearance.

Encouraged by Freya's lady-in-waiting Ingrid, Eric tells the princess that her father may still be alive on the isle. Freya and Ingrid resolve to venture to Gungnir Island alone with the hope of finding the king. While trying to free Thorsson from the Beast's prison, Freya challenges the Beast to a duel to ensure the freedom of her father and Ingrid. As the Beast is about to deliver the final strike, he hesitates upon seeing a familiar pendant that belonged to Agnar. Freya decides to remain on the island to allow Ingrid and Thorsson to escape.

Under Sven's harsh rule, Eric condemns the clan that they have been acting like cowards. He also proclaims that he will save the king's daughter himself if Sven does not dare. Sven, unwilling to appear cowardly, angrily agrees to send an army back to fight the beast and rescue Freya.

As time passes, Freya and the Beast begin to develop a friendship. She learns about the origin of Odin's curse upon him, and the final memories of her beloved Agnar before his death. Sven returns to the island with an army to confront the Beast, but Freya tries to stop them, telling them that the beast is not a monster. Believing that the Beast has bewitched her, Sven refuses to listen to her pleas. Sven and the Beast fight and the battle ends with Sven's archers shooting him, presumably killing the monster. Upon his defeat, Sven orders the warrior's to set Gungnir Island and the Beast's body ablaze as the clan sails back home.

Thorsson fully recovers from his illness and is reinstated as the clan leader. During their wedding celebration, the Beast journeys to Freya's homeland and challenges Sven to a trial by combat for Freya's hand in marriage. The Beast then reveals his identity as Agnar to prove himself worthy of the trail. The two fight and just as Sven gains the upper hand, Freya jumps in front of the Beast to save him from Sven's sword. Sven is killed, and Freya's sacrifice lift's Odin's curse, restoring Agnar back to his human form.

Agnar professes his love for Freya before the princess dies in his arms. The film ends as the clan watches her funeral pyre being set ablaze.

== Cast ==
- Jane March as Freya
- William Gregory Lee as Sven
- Justin Whalin as Eric
- David Dukas as Agnar/Beast
- Greg Melvill-Smith as Thorsson
- Candîce Hillebrand as Ingrid

== Production ==
The movie was filmed in both the United Kingdom and South Africa.

== Reception ==
Scott Weinberg of DVDTalk notes that the DVD cover misleadingly looks like Lord of the Rings, and not "the Halloween-costumed lunatic combination of Beauty and the Beast and The 13th Warrior that it so painfully is." He says the film manages to be "so bad it's good" and suggests catching it on cable television, and concludes "But don't mistake that opinion for a hearty recommendation".
