= Nkhensani Manganyi =

South African actress and fashion designer

- Occupations: Actress and fashion designer

Nkhensani Manganyi (also known as Nkhensani Nkosi) is a South African-born actress and fashion designer.

== Career ==
=== As fashion designer ===
In 2000 Manganyi started the fashion house Stoned Cherrie. The company developed a high profile in South Africa for its use of images of apartheid-era heroes as a recurring motif in its designs of T-shirts and cutaway tops. One of the company's better-known T-shirt designs featured cover from the magazine Drum with the face of the anti-apartheid activist Stephen Biko, murdered by the state security forces in 1977, whose face remains a powerful political symbol of the resistance movement to apartheid.

Her work also includes eyewear and upholstery. She has travelled through Africa as a spokesperson for diversity in African fashion. An image of Manganyi, as Nkhensani Nkosi, working in her Johannesburg studio is included in the book The Language of Fashion Design as an example of how designers develop their collection. Some of Nkosi's work was exhibited at the Fashion Institute of Technology as part of the exhibition Black Fashion Designers from December 2016 to May 2017.

=== Acting and popular media ===
Manganyi's film acting credits include Legend of the Hidden City, Tarzan: The Epic Adventures and Kickboxer 5.

In 2003, Manganyi was a judge on the South African run of the television series Popstars. She commented at the time: "In the past the criticism that (Popstars) is heavily American influenced could be relevant, but I think our new format has helped to change that."
