= Jan Wilkens =

South African professional wrestler

Personal information
- Born: 2 July 1942 Johannesburg, South Africa
- Died: 19 April 2026 (aged 83) Potchefstroom, South Africa

Professional wrestling career
- Ring name(s): Jan Wilkens; Jan Wilko; Jan Wilkins
- Billed height: 6 ft 5 in (1.96 m)
- Billed weight: 280 lb (130 kg)
- Billed from: Johannesburg, South Africa
- Debut: 1955
- Retired: 1987

Jan Wilkens (2 July 1942 in Johannesburg – 19 April 2026) was a South African professional wrestler who was a former South African Heavyweight Champion and six-time EWU World Super Heavyweight Champion.

== Career ==
=== Joint Promotions/Ring Wrestling Stars (1965) ===
Jan Wilkens toured England's Joint Promotions in 1965 and 1966 in his early twenties. On 6 December and 14 December 1965, he defeated Gord Nelson twice by knockout. On 15 December 1965, Wilkens defeated Paul Vachon at the Royal Albert Hall in London On 28 December 1965, he beat Paul Vachon by knockout in Swindon. On 10 January 1966, Wilkens defeated Paul Vachon once again by knockout at Wembley, Middlesex. In Bournemouth on 11 January 1966, Wilkens defeated Vachon. On 19 January 1966, he beat Paul Cox at the Royal Albert Hall. On 25 January 1966, Jan Wilkens defeated Paul Vachon in Chelmsford in what would be Wilkens' final match in England.

=== New Japan Pro-Wrestling (1973) ===
Jan Wilkens toured New Japan Pro-Wrestling in 1973 with fellow Bronco Universal Promotions regular Manie van Zyl as part of the NJPW Big Fight Series. On 2 April 1973, in Ōita, Japan, Wilkens teamed up with Jozsef Molnar to lose to Seiji Sakaguchi and Kotetsu Yamamoto. On 7 April 1973 in Fukushima, he teamed up with Molnar and lost to Seiji Sakaguchi and Osamu Kido. On 12 April 1973 in Sendai, Wilkens teamed up with Manie van Zyl, losing to Seiji Sakaguchi and Kotetsu Yamamoto. In his final match with New Japan Pro-Wrestling on 18 April 1973 in Osaka, Jan Wilkens lost to Antonio Inoki in a singles match in 20:12 when Inoki made him submit to the Octopus Hold.

=== Bronco Universal Promotions/Interworld Wrestling Promotions (1955–1987) ===
Jan Wilkens debuted in 1964 at the age of 21, immediately making an impact on the pro wrestling scene because of his size and ring fervour. On 2 August 1973, Jan Wilkens lost to Otto Wanz in a match to determine the first Catch Wrestling Association CWA World Heavyweight Champion. In 1974, Wilkens defeated Percy Hall to win the South African Heavyweight Title. He became the first EWU World Superheavyweight Champion in the same year. In 1975, Don Leo Jonathan defeated Jan Wilkens to become the second EWU World Super Heavyweight Champion in the title's history before Jan Wilkens subsequently won it back soon after. On 30 October 1976, he lost the title to Seiji Sakaguchi, but regained it on 13 November 1976, to become a 3-time champion. In March, 1980, Wilkens teamed up with Apollo to defeat Sailor White 1 and Sailor White 2 in a tag team match in Johannesburg. In May, 1980, he defeated Angelo Mosca in Cape Town at the Good Hope Centre to retain the South African Heavyweight Title. On 3 October 1981, Blackjack Mulligan defeated Jan Wilkens to win the EWU World Super Heavyweight Championship. A year later, in October, 1982, Wilkens won the EWU World Super Heavyweight Championship back from Blackjack Mulligan. On 13 February 1984, Jan Wilkens lost the championship to Big John Studd, winning it back five days later on 18 February 1984. On 6 October 1984, Hercules Ayala defeated Jan Wilkens to win the EWU World Super Heavyweight Championship. On 3 November 1984, Jan Wilkens defeated Hercules Ayala to become a 6-time EWU World Super Heavyweight Champion. Jan Wilkens announced his retirement in 1984.

After a short time away from professional wrestling, he returned in 1985. In January and August, 1985, he defeated Dalibar Singh twice in Durban. On 5 March 1986, Wilkens defended the EWU World Super Heavyweight Championship against Dirty Jack Burch at the Good Hope Centre in Cape Town, winning via disqualification. Wilkens took revenge on Burch on 26 March 1986 by winning cleanly at the Good Hope Centre. On 28 April 1986, Jan Wilkens lost to Igor Volkoff at the Good Hope Centre. On 10 May 1986, he defeated Scott MacDonald at the Portuguese Hall to retain the EWU World Super Heavyweight Championship. On 29 June 1986, Wilkens defeated Kevin Wacholz to successfully defend the EWU World Super Heavyweight Championship. Jan Wilkens retired in 1987, having his final match and tribute in Cape Town.

== Championships and accomplishments ==
- European Wrestling Union

- EWU World Super Heavyweight Championship (6 times)

- Interworld Wrestling Promotions

- South African Heavyweight Championship (1 time)

== Death ==
Wilkens died at the age of 83 on his farm outside Potchefstroom, where he had lived and farmed for many years.
