= Nadia Bilchik =

South African television personality

- Born: 1964 (age 60–61); South Africa
- Education: University of Cape Town
- Alma mater: Trinity College London
- Occupation: Journalist

Nadia Bilchik (born 1964) is the president of Greater Impact Communications, a professional speaker, and Editorial Producer at CNN.

== Biography ==
Bilchik was born in 1964 to a Jewish family in Johannesburg, South Africa. She received a licentiate in Speech and Drama from Trinity College London and a degree in Drama and English from University of Cape Town. In 1997, she moved to Atlanta. She previously anchored and hosted feature programs for CNN International, CNN Airport Network, and MNet Television in South Africa. In early 2011, she interviewed Nelson Mandela's daughter and granddaughters about his life for CNN. She currently hosts Weekend Morning Passport with T.J. Holmes.

As a speaker, she hosted the launch event for the Georgia Restaurant Association with speaker Ted Turner. She also hosted the opening of SOS Children's Villages in South Africa with Nelson Mandela.

== Books ==
- "The Little Book of Big Networking Ideas: A Guide to Expert Networking"
- "Life After College (Hundreds of Heads Survival Guides"
- "Small Changes: Big Impact"

== Filmography ==
- Acts of Piracy
- Thieves of Fortune
- Soweto Green
