= Joe Mafela =

South African actor, film director and singer (1942–2017)

- Born: Joseph Dau Mafela; 25 June 1942; Sibasa, South Africa
- Died: 18 March 2017 (aged 74); Johannesburg, Soweto South Africa
- Resting place: Westpark Cemetery, Johannesburg
- Occupations: Actor; Musician; Comedian; Producer; Director; Businessman; Writer
- Years active: 1962–2017
- Notable work: Sgudi Snaysi; Generations
- Spouse: Andronica Mafela (m. 1971; died 2017)
- Children: 2

Joe "Sdumo" Mafela (25 June 1942 – 18 March 2017) was a South African actor, writer, producer, director, singer, and businessman.

== Career ==
Mafela was born in Sibasa, Transvaal, South Africa, and brought up in Kliptown and White City Jabavu, in Soweto, near Johannesburg, and then his family remained until 1990 in the Tshiawelo Township that had been set aside for Venda people under Apartheid. He began acting in movies at the age of twenty-two. He played the role of an editor in the movie, Real News. He joined the South African film company SA Films, and over the following 20 years he worked as a producer and director as well as a film actor. He also managed the multi-ethnic dance troupes Mzumba, Sangoma, and the Gold Reef Dancers, which performed in feature films, theaters, and hotels and appeared on four continents. In 1974 Mafela co-starred in the first all-black movie made in South Africa, as Peter Pleasure in Udeliwe. He worked with director Peter R. Hunt (famed for the James Bond movie On Her Majesty's Secret Service) in the 1976 film Shout at the Devil.

With the advent of television in South Africa in 1976, Mafela worked almost continuously in that medium. In 1986 he was cast as the unemployed lodger S'dumo in the Zulu language comedy series 'Sgudi 'Snaysi. The success of 'Sgudi 'Snaysi ("Is Good, Is Nice") – which ran to 78 episodes on SABC – led to roles in other series, often produced by Mafela's own production company Penguin Films. It also encouraged Mafela to enter the advertising industry, working as Creative Director of Black Communications at BBDO South Africa and, since 1992, as a director of Sharrer Advertising in Johannesburg.

Mafela conceptualised and starred in early Chicken Licken television commercials, and authored the company's "It's good, good, good, it's good its nice" jingle during the making of a Chicken Licken commercial in 1986.

In 1996, Gallo Records released the album Shebeleza Fela, with the popular hit "Shebeleza (Congo Mama)". It was a huge success, and "Shebeleza" was a theme song during the Africa Cup of Nations in 1996. Since then, Mafela recorded and released several other albums of Zulu-language songs.

Sometimes called "the face of South African entertainment", and "South Africa's Bill Cosby", he starred as recently as 2011 in the thriller Retribution. Nonetheless, the aging Mafela complained in 2012 that it was hard for him to get acting work. He said he has been told that he is "old and cold". He was in a car accident on 18 March 2017, on the M1 north of Johannesburg, where two cars were involved. He died immediately, leaving behind his wife and four children. He was laid to rest on 29 March 2017 at the Westpark Cemetery in Johannesburg.

== Awards ==
In 2004 Mafela was awarded a special Duku Duku award for their services to the South African television industry. In 2005 he was awarded a Theatre Management of South Africa Lifetime Achievement award at the Naledi Theatre Awards.

== Filmography ==
- Zulu (1964)
- uDeliwe (unknown)
- Tokoloshe (1971)
- Shout at the Devil (1976)
- Escape from Angola (1976)
- Inyakanyaka (1977)
- A Game for Vultures (1979)
- The gods must be crazy(1981)
- 'Sgudi 'Snaysi (1986) (TV)
- Red Scorpion (1989)
- Khululeka (1993) (TV)
- Madam & Eve (2000) (TV)
- Fela's TV (2004) (TV)
- Going Up! (1998) (TV)
- Generations: The Legacy (2015–2017)

== Discography ==
- "Shebeleza Felas" (1995)
- "The Fort E No. 4" (2007)
- "Greatest Moments" (2015)
