= Fezile Mpela =

South African actor

- Born: Fezile Mpela; 16 November 1973 (age 52); Krugersdorp, South Africa
- Education: Tshwane University of Technology
- Occupations: Actor, Singer, Voice artist, Presenter, MC
- Years active: 1992–present
- Height: 1.70 m (5 ft 7 in)
- Spouse: Marilyn Natasha (2014-2018)

Fezile Mpela (born 16 November 1973) is a South African actor, singer, voice artist, presenter and MC. He is best known for the roles in the television serials such as; Mzansi, 7de Laan, Erfsondes and Getroud met Rugby.

== Personal life ==
Mpela was born on 16 November 1973 in Krugersdorp, South Africa. He graduated with a degree in drama at the Pretoria Technikon, which is currently known as Tshwane University of Technology.

In 2014, he married Marilyn Natasha, but later divorced in 2018. In October 2019, Natasha died by suicide where she hung herself at her parents' home in Tembisa, Johannesburg.

== Career ==
In April 1994, he joined M-Net as a continuity presenter. In 1994, he got the opportunity to host The All Africa Film Awards. Since then, he had the privilege to host many award ceremonies in the preceding years including: the Loerie Awards, The SAMA Awards in 2005, Mr and Mrs Pretoria, and many M-Net events. From 2003 to 2004, he hosted the South African version of the international cooking show Ready Steady Cook telecast on SABC2. In August 2008, he hosted the SABC2 game show Where Were You?.

In 2003, he made television acting debut with the DStv's kykNET and M-Net serial Song vir Katryn by playing the role "Hoffie". In 2005, he played the lead role of "Vusi" in the first season of Mzansi. Even though his role became very popular, he quit from the serial due to other commitments where he was replaced by Thapelo Mokoena for the second season. In 2007, he appeared in the SABC2 drama comedy Andries Plak by playing the lead role "Paulus Tshukudu". Then in April 2008, he made a guest role "Prosper Baloyi" in the SABC1 drama serial Mtunzini.com. In the same year, he played the lead role "Lucky" in the SABC1 mini-series Izingane zoBaba, which was an adaptation of William Shakespeare's King Lear. In 2009, he was appointed as the narrator of the first season of the genealogy documentary serial Who Do You Think You Are?.

In 2011, he joined with the SABC1 drama serial Intsika and played the role of "corrupt mayor Malusi". Then in 2012, he worked as the voice over artist for the M-Net reality competition serial MasterChef South Africa for three seasons. In 2013, he played the role "Thato "TT" Mgale" in the SABC3 drama series High Rollers. After receiving popularity for his role, he continued to play the role until the conclusion of the third season. Meanwhile, he won the Golden Horn Award for Best Supporting Actor in a TV Drama Series at the SAFTAs for his role in the series Donkerland. In 2016, he appeared in the kykNET soap opera Getroud met Rugby with the role "Ike", where he later played the role for three seasons.

Mpela also made supportive roles in the films such as; Drum, The Lion King and Born Free 2. In 2006, he acted in two direct-to-video films: Coup! and Folge deinem Herzen. Apart from television and cinema, he made extensive theatre appearances where he played in the stage plays: Songs and Tales from Africa, Kapt'uit op Afrikaans, Joseph and the Amazing Technicolour Dreamcoat, Too Many Cooks, Museum of Modern Mistakes, The Blacks, Roses and Angels, and Private Venture.

== Filmography ==
Year	Film	Role	Genre	Ref.
1993	Generations		TV series	
1995	Sleurstroom	Patrick	TV series	
1996	Born Free: A New Adventure	Nuru	TV movie	
1997	Carpe Diem	Hoender	TV series	
1997	The Legend of the Hidden City	Thabo	TV series	
1998	Kirikou and the Sorceress	L'Oncle	TV series	
1998	Die Vierde Kabinet	Hooky Evans	TV movie	
2000	7de Laan	Sello	TV series	
2003	Song vir Katryn	Hoffie	TV series	
2003	Scout's Safari		TV series	
2004	Drum	Todd Matshikiza	Film	
2005	City Ses'la	Justice Storm	TV series	
2005	Gaz'lam	Rehab Counsellor	TV series	
2005	Hard Copy	Tito Matlala	TV series	
2005	Mzansi	Vusi	TV series	
2006	Mtunzini.com	Prosper	TV series	
2008	Transito	Majoor Mkhize	TV series	
2007	Andries Plak	Paulus Tshukudu	TV series	
2008	Izingane zoBaba	Eddie Luthuli	TV series	
2009	Fluiters	Sam Gumede	TV series	
2010	Erfsondes	Themba	TV series	
2010	Hola Mpinji!	1st Hand Car Dealer/Gunman	TV series	
2011	Intsika	Malusi	TV series	
2011	Winnie Mandela	Cyril Ramaposa	Film	
2011	A Million Colours	Reverend Moloka	Film	
2012	4Play: Sex Tips for Girls	Vincent	TV series	
2012	iNkaba	Zama	TV series	
2013	High Rollers	TT Mogale	TV series	
2013	Let Heaven Wait	Mr Dube	TV series	
2013	Donkerland	Zwide	TV series	
2014	Gauteng Maboneng	Khanyo	TV series	
2015	Bloedbroers	Abraham Mphubani	TV series	
2015	While You Weren't Looking	Actor	TV series	
2015	Dis ek, Anna	Magistrate Motsepe	TV series	
2015	n Pawpaw Vir My Darling	Cyril Phosa	TV series	
2016	Getroud met rugby	Ike	TV series	
2019	Holiday in the Wild		Film	
2019	Shadow	Dr Madi	TV series	
2025	A scam Called Love	Mandla Cele	Film	
