= Clive Scott (actor) =

South African actor (1937–2021)

- Born: Robert Clive Cleghorn; 4 July 1937; Parkview, Johannesburg, South Africa
- Died: 28 July 2021 (aged 84)
- Education: Webber Douglas Academy of Dramatic Art
- Occupation: Actor
- Years active: 1969–2016

Robert Clive Cleghorn (4 July 1937 – 28 July 2021) was a South African radio, film, television and theatre actor and director best known for his performances in the TV soap operas The Villagers and Isidingo.

== Biography ==
Clive Scott was born in Parkview, Johannesburg, South Africa, in 1937, as Robert Clive Cleghorn and went to school in Springs. After the death of his father, his mother settled with him in Muizenberg, Cape Town. He completed his schooling at St. George's Grammar School becoming Head Boy in 1955. His earlier adult career was in banking including a two-year stint in Rhodesia. Having had enough of banking he left for the United Kingdom for three months but ended up staying twelve years. He studied acting at the Webber Douglas Academy of Dramatic Art before taking up acting at various repertory theatres in England. In 1965, Scott performed in The Mousetrap in London. Returning to South Africa in 1970, Scott appeared in one of the first South African television dramas in 1976, The Villagers as Ted Dixon, a series of 76 episodes over three years, and this popular series made him a household name. He has also starred in a number of South African television advertisements. He was also a public speaker and had an interest in esoteric matters. He died on 28 July 2021 at the age of 84.

== Filmography ==
=== Films ===
Year	Title	Role	Notes
1969	Battle of Britain	'A' Station Pilot	Uncredited
1972	My Way	Lionel, reporter	
1973	The Baby Game		
1974	Bait	The Professor in 'The Lesson'	
1975	Sell A Million	Willie van Rensburg	
1976	The Diamond Mercenaries	Sky 4 Pilot	
1976	Funny People	Disgruntled diner	Uncredited
1979	Home Before Midnight		Uncredited
1980	Skelms	Capt. Vlok	
1985	Magic Is Alive, My Friends	Harrison	
1988	Blind Justice	Auctioneer	
1989	Killer Instinct	Mr. Bumbry	
1990	Sweet Murder	Waiter	
1990	The Fourth Reich	Event Announcer	
1992	No Hero	Barry	
1995	Live Wire 2: Human Timebomb	Crocker	
1998	Operation Delta Force 3: Clear Target	Pat Sunland	
1999	Traitor's Heart	Deputy Director Jefferson	
2000	Operation Delta Force 5: Random Fire	Ambassador Clarence Rodman	
2003	Sumuru	Miner	
2003	Citizen Verdict	Judge Thomas Halvern	
2003	Stander	Bank 9 Officer	
2003	Beat the Drum	Pieter Botha	
2005	Duma	Tourist #3 - Eager Man	
2011	Winnie Mandela	Judge FL Rumpff	
2016	Kalushi: The Story of Solomon Mahlangu	Mr. Bragg	(final film role)

=== Television ===
Year	Title	Role	Notes
1971	Doctor Who	Linwood	1 episode
1971	The Last of the Baskets	Mr. Holroyd	1 episode
1976	The Villagers	Ted Dixon	
1981	Oh George!	George Firkel	
1989	Barney Barnato	Payne	
1993	Sweating Bullets	Martin Rush	1 episode
1994	Where Angels Tread		TV movie
1994	Dark Desires: Diana	Charles Walker	TV movie
1997	The Adventures of Sinbad	Midir	1 episode
1997	Operation Delta Force 2: Mayday	Sunland	TV movie
1997	Pride of Africa	Smit	TV movie
1998	Isidingo: The Need	Ted Dixon	TV series
2003	Red Water	Grandpa Gautreau	
2004	Platinum	Henman	TV movie
2008	The Devil's Whore	Minister	1 episode
2009	Wild at Heart	Professor	
