= Julie Adams filmography =

List of performances by an American actress

Julie Adams (born Betty May Adams; October 17, 1926 – February 3, 2019) was an American actress, billed as Julia Adams in her early career. Known for her role in Creature from the Black Lagoon (1954) as well as numerous television guest roles. She starred in a number of films in the 1950s, including Bend of the River (1952), opposite James Stewart. Adams also had an extensive television career including roles as Paula Denning on the 1980s soap opera Capitol, and Eve Simpson on Murder, She Wrote.

== Feature films ==
Feature length films of Julie Adams
Year	Title	Role	Notes	Ref(s)
1949	Red, Hot and Blue	Starlet	Uncredited	
1949	The Dalton Gang	Polly Medford		
1950	Hostile Country	Ann Green		
1950	Marshal of Heldorado	Ann	as Betty Adams	
1950	Crooked River	Ann Hayden	as Betty Adams	
1950	Colorado Ranger	Ann	as Betty Adams	
1950	West of the Brazos	Ann Greene		
1950	Fast on the Draw	Ann		
1950	For Heaven's Sake	Joe's Mother	Scenes deleted	
1951	Bright Victory	Chris Paterson	Credited as Julia Adams	
1951	Hollywood Story	Sally Rousseau / Amanda Rousseau	Credited as Julia Adams	
1952	Finders Keepers	Sue Kipps		
1952	Bend of the River	Laura Baile	Credited as Julia Adams; With James Stewart	
1952	The Treasure of Lost Canyon	Myra Wade	Credited as Julia Adams	
1952	Horizons West	Lorna Hardin	Credited as Julia Adams	
1952	The Lawless Breed	Rosie McCoy	Credited as Julia Adams	
1953	The Mississippi Gambler	Ann Conant	Credited as Julia Adams	
1953	The Man from the Alamo	Beth Anders	Credited as Julia Adams	
1953	The Stand at Apache River	Valerie Kendrick		
1953	Wings of the Hawk	Raquel Noriega	Credited as Julia Adams	
1954	Creature from the Black Lagoon	Kay Lawrence	Credited as Julia Adams	
1954	Francis Joins the WACS	Captain Jane Parker	With Donald O'Connor	
1955	Six Bridges to Cross	Ellen Gallagher		
1955	The Looters	Sheryl Gregory		
1955	One Desire	Judith Watrous	credited as Julia Adams	
1956	The Private War of Major Benson	Dr. Kay Lambert		
1956	Away All Boats	Nadine MacDougall	With Jeff Chandler	
1957	Four Girls in Town	Kathy Conway		
1957	Slaughter on Tenth Avenue	Daisy 'Dee' Pauley		
1957	Slim Carter	Clover Doyle		
1958	Tarawa Beachhead	Ruth Campbell		
1959	The Gunfight at Dodge City	Pauline Howard		
1960	Raymie	Helen		
1962	The Underwater City	Monica Powers		
1965	Tickle Me	Vera Radford		
1967	Valley of Mystery	Joan Simon		
1971	The Last Movie	Mrs. Anderson		
1974	McQ	Elaine		
1975	The Wild McCullochs	Hannah McCulloch		
1975	Psychic Killer	Dr. Laura Scott		
1976	The Killer Inside Me	Mother		
1978	Goodbye, Franklin High	Janice Armer		
1978	The Fifth Floor	Nurse Hannelord		
1984	Champions	Emma Hussey		
1988	Black Roses	Mrs. Miller		
1990	Catchfire	Martha		
2006	World Trade Center	Allison's Grandmother		
2011	Carnage	Secretary		
2018	The Lucky Southern Star	Grandma	Short, last film role	

== Television films ==
Television films of Julie Adams
Date	Title	Role	Ref(s)
1971	The Trackers	Dora Paxton	
1973	Go Ask Alice	Dorothy	
1976	Six Characters in Search of an Author	The Mother	
1978	Greatest Heroes of the Bible	The Queen	
1988	Broken Angel		
1993	The Conviction of Kitty Dodds	Margaret	

== Recurring television roles ==
Recurring series roles of Julie Adams
Year(s)	Series	Role	Episodes	Ref(s)
1969-1970	General Hospital	Denise Wilton		
1971–1972	The Jimmy Stewart Show	Dorothy	24 episodes	
1981–1982	Code Red	Ann Rorchek	19 episodes	
1982–1987	Capitol	Paula Denning	3 episodes	
1987–1993	Murder, She Wrote	Eve Simpson	10 episodes	

== Television guest appearances ==
Television guest appearances of Julie Adams
Date	Series	Episode	Role	Ref(s)
April 1, 1949	Your Show Time	"The Tenor"	as Betty Adams	
November 3, 1955	Lux Video Theatre	"Appointment for Love"		
February 20, 1956	Studio One	"Circle of Guilt"		
January 10, 1957	Lux Video Theatre	"Just Across the Street"		
June 13, 1957	Lux Video Theatre	"Design for November"		
November 14, 1957	Climax!	"Two Tests for Tuesday"	Coleen	
January 19, 1958	The Loretta Young Show	"The Hidden One"		
March 14, 1958	Zane Grey Theatre	"Man of Fear"	Julie Brand	
April 10, 1958	NBC Matinee Theater	"A Case of Fear"		
April 17, 1958	Playhouse 90	"The Dungeon"	Janice Ohringer	
June 29, 1958	Alfred Hitchcock Presents	"Little White Frock"	Carol Longsworth	
October 2, 1958	Yancy Derringer	"Return to New Orleans"	Amanda Eaton	
November 15, 1958	Zane Grey Theatre	"The Tall Shadow"	Nora Jepson	
December 8, 1958	Goodyear Theatre	"Points Beyond"	Marion Ewell	
February 22, 1959	Maverick	"The Brasada Spur"	Wilma White	
February 24, 1959	Alcoa Presents: One Step Beyond	"Epilogue"	Helen Archer	
March 6, 1959	77 Sunset Strip	"The Fifth Stair"	Margot Wendice	
May 1, 1959	The Adventures of Ellery Queen	"The Curse of Aden"		
May 15, 1959	77 Sunset Strip	"Canine Caper"	Marie La Shelle	
May 19, 1959	Steve Canyon	"Project U.F.O."	Amanda Crown	
October 10, 1959	The Man and the Challenge	"Experiments in Terror"	Linda Webb	
November 22, 1959	Alfred Hitchcock Presents	"Dead Weight"	Peg Valence	
December 6, 1959	The Alaskans	"Doc Booker"	Clara	
January 4, 1960	Cheyenne	"Gold, Glory and Custer - Prelude"	Irene Travers	
January 11, 1960	Cheyenne	Gold, Glory and Custer - Requiem"	Irene Travers	
January 24, 1960	Maverick	"The White Widow"	Belle Morgan	
February 8, 1960	Goodyear Theatre	"Minister Accused"	Betty Fordham	
March 4, 1960	77 Sunset Strip	"Safari"	Miriam Galbraith	
April 13, 1960	Hawaiian Eye	"Murder, Anyone?"	Sara Crane	
May 24, 1960	The Rifleman	"Nora"	Nora Sanford	
August 18, 1960	Markham	"Crash in the Desert"	Stacey Winters	
August 25, 1960	Wrangler	"The Affair with Browning's Woman"	Eve Browning	
October 22, 1960	Checkmate	"Face in the Window"	Janet Evans	
September 21, 1960	Tate	"The Return of Jessica Jackson"	Mary Hardin	
November 18, 1960	Michael Shayne	"This is it, Michael Shayne"	Beatrice Drake	
January 5, 1961	Outlaws	"Return to New March"	Juill Ramsur	
January 7, 1961	Bonanza	"The Courtship"	Helen Layton	
January 10, 1961	Alfred Hitchcock Presents	"Summer Shade"	Phyllis Kendall	
January 16, 1961	Surfside 6	"Facts on the Fire"	Merilee Williams	
January 25, 1961	Hawaiian Eye	"Robinson Koyoto"	Gloria Matthews	
March 17, 1961	77 Sunset Strip	"Open and Close in One"	Norma Kellogg	
October 30, 1961	Surfside 6	"Laugh for the Lady"	Julie Owens	
March 19, 1962	The Andy Griffith Show	"The County Nurse"	Mary Simpson	
March 20, 1962	The Dick Powell Show	"330 Independence S.W."	Robin	
April 19, 1962	Dr. Kildare	"The Horn of Plenty"	Ginny Nelson	
May 2, 1962	Checkmate	"The Someday Man"	Jean Damion	
March 16, 1963	The Gallant Men	"A Taste of Peace"	Captain Meg Thorpe	
April 4, 1963	Perry Mason	"The Case of the Lover's Leap"	Valerie Comstock	
October 17, 1963	Perry Mason	"The Case of the Deadly Verdict"	Janice Barton	
November 10, 1963	Arrest and Trial	"Inquest into a Bleeding Heart"	Eleanor Safford	
January 10, 1964	77 Sunset Strip	"Alimony League"	Anne Kenzie	
May 28, 1964	Kraft Suspense Theatre	"The Robrioz Ring"	Ellen Yarnell	
September 24, 1964	Perry Mason	"The Case of the Missing Button"	Janice Blake	
April 29, 1965	Kraft Suspense Theatre	"Kill No More"	Joanne Clay	
September 19, 1965	Perry Mason	"The Case of the Fatal Fortune"	Patricia L. Kean	
October 11, 1965	Twelve O'Clock High	"Big Brother"	Lieutenant Betty Russo	
November 17, 1965	Amos Burke, Secret Agent	"Deadlier than the Male"	Carla Cabral	
November 18, 1965	The Long, Hot Summer	"Bitter Harvest"	Leona Mills	
April 6, 1966	The Virginian	"No Drums, No Trumpets"	Marian Clay	
October 31, 1966	The Big Valley	"Target"	Janet Masters	
April 4, 1967	The Girl from U.N.C.L.E.	"The High and the Deadly Affair	Julia Douglas	
December 30, 1967	Mannix	"Then the Drink Takes the Man"	Liza	
February 8, 1968	The Mod Squad	"Scion of Death"	Nancy Ryan	
February 12, 1968	The Big Valley	"The Emperor of Rice"	Edna Wesley	
October 29, 1968	The Mod Squad	"You Can't Tell the Players Without a Programmer"	Samantha Semple	
October 31, 1968	Ironside	"I, the People"	Norma Howard	
November 20, 1968	The Outsider	"One Long-Stemmed American Beauty"	Laura Carlvic	
1968	This Is the Life	"Run Away to Home"	Ruth	
January 19, 1969	My Friend Tony	"Voices"	Karen Kent Walker	
October 7, 1969	Marcus Welby, M.D.	"Don't Ignore the Miracles"	Claire Berwick	
November 9, 1969	The F.B.I.	"Blood Tie"	Denise Kriton	
October 11, 1970	The Bold Ones: The New Doctors	"Killer on the Loose"	Lynn Craig	
November 18, 1970	Dan August	"Epitaph for a Swinger"	Patricia Fairley	
January 24, 1971	The Bold Ones: The New Doctors	"An Absence of Loneliness"	Lynn Craig	
February 24, 1971	The Young Lawyers	"And the Walls Came Tumbling Down"	Alice Graham	
January 19, 1972	Night Gallery	"The Miracle at Camafeo"	Gay Melcor	
November 15, 1972	Cannon	"Child of Fear"	Meg Lucas	
February 14, 1973	Search	"The Clayton Lewis Document"	Jeanette Lewis	
October 7, 1973	Mannix	"Little Girl Lost"	Edie Reynolds	
September 11, 1974	Lucas Tanner	"A Matter of Love"	Mrs. Walker	
January 20, 1975	Kolchak: The Night Stalker	"Mr. R.I.N.G."	Mrs. Avery Walker	
February 17, 1975	Caribe	"The Plastic Connection"	Mrs. Bladell	
February 27, 1975	The Streets of San Francisco	"Labyrinth"	Judith	
October 21, 1975	Marcus Welby, M.D.	"An End and a Beginning"	Lee Morgan	
September 19, 1975	Mobile One	"The Pawn"	Alma Marvin	
November 13, 1975	Ellery Queen	"The Adventure of Veronica's Veils"	Jennifer Packard	
November 19, 1975	Cannon	"The Wedding March"	Sylvia Killian	
February 9, 1976	Medical Center	"The Stranger"	Ellie Wolfe	
January 2, 1977	McMillan & Wife	"Dark Sunrise"	Dorothy Wininger	
November 11, 1977	Quincy, M.E.	"Main Man"	Mrs. Daniels	
May 25, 1977	This Is the Life	"Man in the Middle"	Alice	
February 22, 1978	Police Woman	"Murder with Pretty People"	Eleanor Simpson	
May 4, 1978	The Runaways	"Melinda and the Pinball Wizard"	Mother	
May 12, 1978	The Incredible Hulk	"Life and Death"	Ellen	
January 10, 1980	Quincy, M.E.	"Honor Thy Elders"	Sharon Ross	
March 30, 1980	Trapper John, M.D.	"Hot Line"	Lorrie Malcolm	
January 21, 1981	Vega$	"Murder by Mirrors"	Margaret Sorenson	
February 3, 1981	Too Close for Comfort	"A Fine Romance"	Sylvia Walker	
August 9, 1982	Cagney & Lacey	"Better than Equal"	Helen Granger	
November 24, 1982	Quincy, M.E.	"Science for Sale"	Dr. Chris Winston	
November 24, 1984	Too Close for Comfort	"Divorce Chicago Style"	Sylvia Walker	
September 8, 1993	Beverly Hills, 90210	"So Long, Farewell, Auf Wiedersehen, Goodbye"	Arlene Beevis	
October 27, 1993	Beverly Hills, 90210	"Twenty Years Ago Today"	Arlene Beevis	
February 13, 1997	Diagnosis: Murder	"Hard-Boiled Murder"	Edie Reynolds Fallon	
January 25, 1999	Melrose Place	"A Fist Full of Secrets"	Mrs. Damarr	
April 16, 1999	Sliders	"Roads Taken"	Old Maggie Beckett	
April 24, 2000	Family Law	"Second Chance"	Bonnie	
October 4, 2006	Lost	"A Tale of Two Cities"	Amelia	
October 29, 2006	Cold Case	"Static"	Dottie Mills	
October 31, 2007	CSI: NY	"Boo"	Betty Willens	
January 21, 2008	Lost: Missing Pieces	"The Envelope"	Amelia	

== Sources ==
- Aaker, Everett (2024). Television Western Players of the Fifties: A Biographical Encyclopedia of All Regular Cast Members in Western Series, 1949-1959. Jefferson, North Carolina: McFarland & Company. ISBN 978-1-4766-0635-4.
- Brooks, Tim; Marsh, Earle F. (2003). The Complete Directory to Prime Time Network and Cable TV Shows, 1946-Present (8th ed.). New York: Ballantine Books. ISBN 0-345-45542-8.
- Garver, Kathy (2015). Surviving Cissy: My Family Affair of Life in Hollywood. Simon and Schuster. ISBN 978-1-63076-116-5.
- Gianakos, Larry James (1980). Television Drama Series Programming: A Comprehensive Chronicle, 1947-1959. Bloomsbury Academic. ISBN 0-8108-1330-0.
- Gianakos, Larry James (1978). Television Drama Series Programming: A Comprehensive Chronicle, 1959-1975. Bloomsbury Academic. ISBN 0-8108-1116-2.
- Gianakos, Larry James (1981). Television Drama Series Programming: A Comprehensive Chronicle, 1975-1980. Bloomsbury Academic. ISBN 0-8108-1438-2.
- Gianakos, Larry James (1983). Television Drama Series Programming: A Comprehensive Chronicle, 1980-1982. Bloomsbury Academic. ISBN 0-8108-1626-1.
- Gianakos, Larry James (1987). Television Drama Series Programming: A Comprehensive Chronicle, 1982-1984. Bloomsbury Academic. ISBN 0-8108-1876-0.
- Hill, Ona L. (2012). Raymond Burr: A Film, Radio and Television Biography. Jefferson, North Carolina: McFarland & Company. ISBN 978-0-7864-9137-7.
- Katz, Ephraim; Nolen, Ronald Dean (2013). The Film Encyclopedia: The Complete Guide to Film and the Film Industry. HarperCollins. ISBN 978-0-06-227711-4.
- Joyner, C. Courtney (2015). The Westerners: Interviews with Actors, Directors, Writers and Producers. Jefferson, North Carolina: McFarland & Company. ISBN 978-0-7864-5568-3.
- LaGuardia, Robert (1977). From Ma Perkins to Mary Hartman: The Illustrated History of Soap Operas. Ballantine Books. ISBN 978-0-345-25562-4.
- Lentz, Harris M. (1997). Television Westerns Episode Guide: All United States Series, 1949-1996. Jefferson, North Carolina: McFarland & Company. ISBN 978-0-7864-7386-1.
- McFadden, Robert D. (2019-02-04). "Julie Adams, Seized by Creature in 'Black Lagoon,' Dies at 92". The New York Times. ISSN 0362-4331.
- Magers, Boyd; Fitzgerald, Michael G. (1999). Westerns Women: Interviews with 50 Leading Ladies of Movie and Television Westerns from the 1930s to the 1960s. Jefferson, North Carolina: McFarland & Company. ISBN 978-0-7864-0672-2.
- Monush, Barry (2003). Screen World Presents the Encyclopedia of Hollywood Film Actors: From the silent era to 1965. Hal Leonard. ISBN 978-1-55783-551-2.
- Parish, James Robert (1997). The Unofficial Murder, She Wrote Casebook. Kensington Books. ISBN 978-1-57566-210-7.
- Robinson, Dale; Fernandes, David (2012). The Definitive Andy Griffith Show Reference: Episode-by-Episode, with Cast and Production Biographies and a Guide to Collectibles. Jefferson, North Carolina: McFarland & Company. ISBN 978-1-4766-0187-8.
- Rouse, Sarah; Loughney, Katharine (1989). 3 Decades of Television: A Catalog of Television Programs Acquired by the Library of Congress, 1949-1979. Library of Congress. ISBN 978-0-8444-0544-5.
- Schnakenberg, Robert (2014-10-21). The Encyclopedia Shatnerica: An A to Z Guide to the Man and His Universe. Philadelphia: Quirk Books. ISBN 978-1-59474-776-2.
- Ward, Jack (1993). Television Guest Stars: An Illustrated Career Chronicle for 678 Performers of the Sixties and Seventies. Jefferson, North Carolina: McFarland & Company. ISBN 978-0-89950-807-8.
- Weaver, Tom; Schecter, David; Kiss, Robert J. (2017). Universal Terrors, 1951-1955: Eight Classic Horror and Science Fiction Films. Jefferson, North Carolina: McFarland & Company. ISBN 978-1-4766-2776-2.
- Weaver, Tom (2025). They Fought in the Creature Features: Interviews with 23 Classic Horror, Science Fiction and Serial Stars. Jefferson, North Carolina: McFarland & Company. ISBN 978-1-4766-1686-5.
