= Messenger of Death =

1988 film by J. Lee Thompson

- Theatrical release poster
- Directed by: J. Lee Thompson
- Written by: Paul Jarrico
- Based on: novel The Avenging Angel by Rex Burns
- Produced by: Pancho Kohner
- Starring: Charles Bronson; Trish Van Devere; Laurence Luckinbill; Daniel Benzali; Marilyn Hassett; John Ireland
- Cinematography: Gideon Porath
- Edited by: Peter Lee-Thompson
- Music by: Robert O. Ragland
- Distributed by: Cannon Films
- Release date: September 16, 1988 (U.S.)
- Running time: 91 mins.
- Country: United States
- Language: English
- Budget: [Unknown]
- Box office: $3,074,681 (USA)

Messenger of Death is a 1988 American vigilante action thriller film starring Charles Bronson. It is about an attempt by a water company to start a family feud among fundamentalist Mormons to take the family's land for the company.

The movie marks the eighth collaboration between Bronson and director J. Lee Thompson (following 1976's St. Ives, 1977's The White Buffalo, 1980's Caboblanco, 1983's 10 to Midnight, 1984's The Evil That Men Do, 1986's Murphy's Law, and 1987's Death Wish 4: The Crackdown).

== Plot ==
Children play outside a rural Colorado home. They belong to Orville Beecham and his three wives. Two masked men pull up in a truck and wait for the children to go inside. They proceed to kill the three mothers, who are sister wives, and the children. The police arrive before the father, Orville, who returns to find his family massacred.

Arriving on the scene with the chief of police, Barney Doyle is a Denver newspaper reporter, Garret Smith. They were having lunch with a wealthy local businessman, Homer Foxx, to discuss how to get Barney elected Denver mayor when Barney was called about the murders.

Garret does a news story on the massacre. Orville is in a local jail, there "for his own protection." Orville is reluctant to talk to Garret but does reveal that his father, Willis Beecham, may have been involved. Willis lives in a compound with his followers. He is an excommunicated fundamentalist Mormon who practices polygamy, as do his son and followers. Willis is the sect's prophet.

Willis tells the reporter that he believes that it was his brother, Zenas Beecham, who killed Orville's family. Willis and Zenas are alienated from each other by a doctrinal dispute.

Garret, aided by a local editor named Jastra Watson, begins to investigate if Zenas could be behind the killings. Zenas lives in a different Colorado county on a large farm that happens to sit on an artesian lake that a large corporation, The Colorado Water Company, has wanted for years. Zenas tells the reporter that Willis probably killed the family of his own son because Willis preaches blood atonement. The symbol of both brothers is an avenging angel, which is alleged to be an early Mormon symbol with a doctrinal counterpart reflecting the idea of blood atonement.

As soon as Orville is released from jail, he returns to his father's compound and plots to attack Zenas in retaliation. Garret tries to warn Zenas, but it's too late. Armed men back each man and they open fire. Garret gets them to agree to a cease fire, but a third-party shoots Zenas (not one of the followers) and the shooting begins again. Zenas and Willis both are killed.

Garret realizes what is happening—The Colorado Water Company is behind everything. The company has hired an assassin and a junior partner to murder Orville's family, counting on the feud between the brothers to eliminate the rest.

Garret is approached by the junior assassin to make a deal, but the senior assassin kills his partner. It turns out the person who hired the assassin is Foxx, the businessman trying to get the police chief elected mayor.

The assassin shows up at a fundraising party for Doyle thrown by Foxx, where he attempts to kill Garret. The reporter gains the upper hand and gets the assassin to reveal that it was Foxx who was responsible for all of the murders. Foxx steals the chief's gun and kills himself.

== Cast ==
- Charles Bronson as Garret Smith
- Trish Van Devere as Jastra Watson
- Laurence Luckinbill as Homer Foxx
- Daniel Benzali as Chief Barney Doyle
- Marilyn Hassett as Josephine Fabrizio
- Charles Dierkop as Orville Beecham
- Jeff Corey as Willis Beecham
- John Ireland as Zenas Beecham
- Penny Peyser as Trudy Pike
- Jon Cedar as Saul
- Gene Davis as Junior Assassin
- John Solari as Senior Assassin
- Tom Everett as Wiley
- Duncan Gamble as Lieutenant Scully
- Bert Williams as Sheriff Roy Yates
- Cheryl Waters as Magda Beecham
- Maria Mayenzet as Esther Beecham
- Margaret Howell as Naomi Beecham
- Warner Loughlin as Ruth Beecham
- Kimberly Beck as Piety Beecham
- Beverly Thompson as Mrs. Lucy Bigelow
- Don Kennedy as Cyrus Pike
- Susan Bjurman as Mrs. Doyle

== Production ==
The film was based on a novel The Avenging Angel by Rex Burns which was published in 1983. It was the fifth in a series of novels starring Denver detective Gabe Wager. The New York Times said "There is plenty of action in the book, culminating in a real Western shoot-out. And, of course, we learn a lot - perhaps more than we want to - about Wager's emotional life. Still, Mr. Burns is a skillful and sensitive writer, and The Avenging Angel moves in a big, logical curve up to its wingding ending. It is as welcome as its predecessors."

Filming took place in LA and Colorado in 1987.

Bronson had just made Death Wish IV and expressed interest in making different types of films. "I prefer to play different characters in films. And I wouldn't want to be in a weekly TV series. I imagine a lot of series stars fall asleep playing the same guy every week. Some of them relax when they know their show is signed for a whole season. I admire Tom Selleck; he keeps bringing new things to his series."

"It's a nice script," said co star Trish Van Devere. "It's a Charles Bronson movie without much violence; I think that's why it interested him."

Marilyn Hassett said "It's nice to be playing just an ordinary, all-American girl after a career cast as serious, emotionally disturbed or crippled people."

== Reception ==
=== Critical response ===
In the New York Times, Richard F. Shepard wrote that if the film "were a novel, it could be called a decent page turner, one that holds the eye and makes one wonder whodunit... Mr. Bronson is more a messenger of peace, an intermediary between the warring factions who is more shot upon than shooting. He does not even tote a gun in this movie... Bronson fans need not worry that their hero and his movies are going soft, however. There are enough bodies, car-crushings and lingering scenes of victims crossing over into death to slake any aficionado's thirst for blood."

In the Los Angeles Times, Kevin Thomas called it "a solid, efficient mystery, crisply directed by J. Lee Thompson...a genre piece from start to finish, nothing more, nothing less. But its cast is effective, and it gains from its Colorado locations, which include two religious communities that have the look of the real thing."
