= Murphy's Law (film) =

1986 thriller film by J. Lee Thompson

- Theatrical release poster
- Directed by: J. Lee Thompson
- Written by: Gail Morgan Hickman
- Produced by: Pancho Kohner
- Starring: Charles Bronson; Carrie Snodgress; Robert F. Lyons; Richard Romanus; Kathleen Wilhoite; Angel Tompkins
- Cinematography: Alex Phillips Jr.
- Edited by: Peter Lee-Thompson; Charles Simmons
- Music by: Marc Donahue; Valentine McCallum
- Production company: Cannon Films
- Distributed by: Cannon Films
- Release date: April 18, 1986 (U.S.)
- Running time: 100 minutes
- Country: United States
- Language: English
- Budget: $8 million
- Box office: $9,947,631 (U.S.)

Murphy's Law is a 1986 American neo-noir action thriller film directed by J. Lee Thompson from a screenplay by Gail Morgan Hickman. It stars Charles Bronson, Kathleen Wilhoite, and Carrie Snodgress, with a supporting cast featuring Robert F. Lyons, Richard Romanus, Angel Tompkins and Lawrence Tierney.

Bronson plays an antisocial detective of the Los Angeles Police Department (LAPD) who is miserable due to the failures of both his marriage and his career. His former foe returns to seek revenge, framing the detective for the murders of his ex-wife, her boyfriend, and several of his own associates. On the run from the police, the detective teams-up with a petty thief who he had earlier arrested.

Murphy's Law was released by Cannon Films on April 18, 1986. The film marked the sixth collaboration between Bronson and director J. Lee Thompson (following 1976's St. Ives, 1977's The White Buffalo, 1980's Caboblanco, 1983's 10 to Midnight, and 1984's The Evil That Men Do).

== Plot ==
Jack Murphy, a hardened, antisocial alcoholic LAPD detective, frequently escapes the harsh reality that his ex-wife has become a stripper and his career is going nowhere by drinking. His world is turned upside down, however, when he is framed by ex-convict Joan Freeman for putting her in prison earlier in his career.

Freeman murders the detective's ex-wife and her boyfriend and begins killing off his associates while framing him for the crimes. The same police force he works for places him under arrest with Arabella McGee, a foul-mouthed petty thief he locked away. Murphy escapes from jail while still handcuffed to McGee and they pursue the real killer. While in pursuit of Freeman, who has managed to kill all of those on her hit list save Murphy, Arabella is kidnapped by Freeman and taken to the building where she was first arrested by Murphy.

Murphy calls for reinforcements and is met with skepticism, unaware that the officer he notified, Ed Reineke, is a mole for mobster Frank Vincenzo. Vincenzo is seeking vengeance against Murphy for the latter killing his brother earlier in the film. Murphy heads attempts to rescue Arabella, but is ambushed by Freeman. Meanwhile, Arabella is bound and gagged at the bottom of an elevator shaft. Reineke trains his gun on Murphy. Freeman quickly dispatches Reineke with an arrow. Unaware of what has transpired, Vincenzo and his two bodyguards enter the building to exact their vengeance. Murphy easily dispatches the bodyguards before goading Vincenzo into trying to kill him. Vincenzo attacks Murphy but Murphy shoots him dead. Freeman sends the elevator down in an attempt to kill Arabella. Murphy saves her in the nick of time, but Freeman shoots an arrow into Arabella's back, goading Murphy into a confrontation. She attacks Murphy with an axe, wounds him, and he knocks her over the railing of the staircase on the top floor. She manages to take hold of the axe wedged in the railing. She tries to get Murphy to help her, but he lets her fall to her death. Murphy is loaded into the back of an ambulance with a still-living Arabella, and they are taken to the hospital.

== Cast ==
- Charles Bronson as Det. Jack Murphy
- Kathleen Wilhoite as Arabella McGee
- Carrie Snodgress as Joan Freeman
- Robert F. Lyons as Det. Art Penney
- Richard Romanus as Frank Vincenzo
- James Luisi as Sgt. Ed Reineke
- Bill Henderson as Ben Wilcove
- Angel Tompkins as Jan Murphy
- Janet MacLachlan as Dr. Lovell
- Clifford A. Pellow as Lt. Nachman
- Lawrence Tierney as Cameron
- Jerome Thor as Judge Kellerman
- Mischa Hausserman as Dave Manzarek
- Cal Haynes as Reese
- Hans Howes as Santana
- Joseph Roman as Carl
- Chris De Rose as Tony Vincenzo
- Frank Annese as Kelly
- Paul McCallum as Hog
- Dennis Hayden as Sonny
- Tony Montero as Max
- David Hayman as Jack

== Production ==
Shooting took place in Los Angeles. The climactic sequence was filmed at the Bradbury Building.

Joan Jett was strongly considered for the role of Arabella, but Kathleen Wilhoite ultimately won out due to her greater acting experience. However, Jett remained friends with Charles Bronson and his wife Jill Ireland, who later inspired her song "Don't Surrender". Madonna, Rae Dawn Chong, and Apollonia Kotero were also considered; the producers passed on Madonna because her asking price was too high.

The film score was written music by Marc Donahue and Valentine McCallum, Charles Bronson's step-son.

== Reception ==
=== Critical response ===
Variety gave a mixed review of Murphy's Law, referring to the film as a "very violent urban crime meller, is tiresome but too filled with extreme incident to be boring." The New York Times described the film's plot as "flimsy" and noted that "it seems we're meant to be drawn into this nonexistent story. Yet there's nothing, not even the obligatory injustice done to Jack Murphy, that gives the movie even the pretense of emotional power or intrigue."

Online film database Allmovie gave the film one and a half stars out of five, describing it as an "often silly but fitfully amusing potboiler [that] is one of the better Charles Bronson vehicles from his 1980s era."
