= The Long Rope =

The Long Rope may refer to:

== Films ==
- The Long Rope (1953 film), British crime drama directed by Wolf Rilla; original title The Large Rope
- The Long Rope (1961 film), American western directed by William Witney

== Television and radio ==
- "The Long Rope", a 1949 episode of American radio series The Adventures of Philip Marlowe
- "The Long Rope", a 1960 episode of American TV western Cheyenne
