= The Hitcher (1986 film) =

1986 American action horror film by Robert Harmon

- Theatrical release poster
- Directed by: Robert Harmon
- Written by: Eric Red
- Produced by: David Bombyk; Kip Ohman
- Starring: Rutger Hauer; C. Thomas Howell; Jeffrey DeMunn; Jennifer Jason Leigh
- Cinematography: John Seale
- Edited by: Frank J. Urioste
- Music by: Mark Isham
- Production companies: HBO Pictures; Silver Screen Partners
- Distributed by: Tri-Star Pictures
- Release date: February 21, 1986
- Running time: 97 minutes
- Country: United States
- Language: English
- Budget: $7.9 million
- Box office: $5.8 million

The Hitcher is a 1986 American action horror film directed by Robert Harmon and written by Eric Red. It stars Rutger Hauer as the title character, a murderous hitchhiker who stalks a young motorist (C. Thomas Howell) across the highways of West Texas. Jeffrey DeMunn and Jennifer Jason Leigh appear in supporting roles.

Released in the United States on February 21, 1986, the film was originally met with tepid critical and commercial response, grossing $5.8 million on a $7.9 million budget. In later years, it has been reappraised as a cult classic. The film was followed by a 2003 sequel, The Hitcher II: I've Been Waiting, which featured Howell reprising his role, and a 2007 remake.

== Plot ==
Jim Halsey, a young man delivering a car from Chicago to San Diego, spots a man hitchhiking in the West Texas desert and gives him a ride. The hitchhiker, who calls himself John Ryder, forces Jim's leg down on the accelerator when they pass a stranded car. Ryder states he murdered and dismembered the driver and intends to do the same to Jim, threatening him with a switchblade. Terrified, Jim asks what Ryder wants. He replies, "I want you to stop me." When Jim notices that Ryder's seat belt is unbuckled and the passenger door is ajar, he shoves Ryder out of the moving car.

Relieved, Jim continues his journey. When he sees Ryder in the back of a family car, Jim tries to warn the occupants, but has a minor accident. He comes across the family's blood-soaked car and vomits. Ryder corners Jim but simply tosses him the keys from Jim's car. Ryder leaves with a trucker and nearly runs Jim down with the truck, which crashes into the pumps of a gas station. As Jim flees, Ryder causes the station to explode.

At a roadside diner, Jim meets Nash, a waitress who cooks him lunch while he calls the police. He finds a severed finger among his French fries, indicating Ryder's proximity. The police arrive and arrest Jim, whom Ryder is framing for his murders. Though the police doubt his guilt, they lock him up overnight as protocol. Jim wakes to find the cell door unlocked and the officers murdered. He panics and flees with a revolver. At a gas station, he sees two officers, takes them hostage, and forces one of them to drive. Jim speaks on the radio to Captain Esteridge, the officer in charge of the manhunt. As Esteridge convinces Jim to surrender, Ryder pulls alongside and kills the two officers.

The patrol car crashes, and Ryder disappears again. After briefly considering suicide, Jim reaches a café, where Ryder confronts him. He points out Jim's revolver is unloaded. Ryder leaves him several bullets and departs. Jim boards a bus, where he meets Nash and explains his situation. After a police car pulls the bus over, Jim surrenders. The furious officers accuse him of killing their colleagues and are about to kill him. Nash appears with Jim's revolver, disarms the officers, and flees with Jim in their patrol car. As the police chase after them, Ryder joins the chase and murders the officers by causing a massive car accident and shooting down a police helicopter.

Jim and Nash abandon the patrol car and hike to a motel. While Jim is in the shower, Ryder abducts Nash. Jim searches for her. Captain Esteridge discovers Jim and enlists him to negotiate with Ryder, who is at the wheel of a large Mack truck. Ryder has gagged and tied Nash between the truck and its trailer hitch, and is threatening to tear her apart. Esteridge tells Jim that his men cannot shoot Ryder because his foot would slip off the clutch, causing the truck to roll. Jim enters the cab with Ryder, who gives him a revolver and tells him to shoot, but Jim is unable to do so. Ryder, disappointed, releases the clutch, killing Nash.

Ryder is taken into custody. Esteridge gives Jim a ride, but Jim, believing the police cannot hold Ryder, takes Esteridge's revolver and vehicle to chase down Ryder's prison bus. Ryder kills the deputies and leaps through Jim's windshield as the bus crashes. Jim slams on his brakes, sending Ryder through the windshield and onto the road. Ryder challenges Jim to run him over, which he does. When Jim leaves his car to look at Ryder's body, Ryder jumps up, but Jim shoots him repeatedly with a shotgun, killing him. Jim leans against Esteridge's car in a daze and smokes a cigarette as the sun sets.

== Cast ==
- Rutger Hauer as John Ryder
- C. Thomas Howell as Jim Halsey
- Jennifer Jason Leigh as Nash
- Jeffrey DeMunn as Captain Esteridge
- John M. Jackson as Sergeant Starr
- Billy Greenbush as Trooper Donner
- Jack Thibeau as Trooper Prestone
- Armin Shimerman as Interrogation Sergeant
- Gene Davis as Trooper Dodge
- Jon Van Ness as Trooper Hapscomb
- Henry Darrow as Trooper Hancock
- Tony Epper as Trooper Conners
- Tom Spratley as Proprietor

== Production ==
=== Development ===
When writer Eric Red was 20 years old, he made a short film entitled Gunman's Blues in the hopes of getting the opportunity to direct a feature-length film. When no offers came, he moved from New York City to Austin, Texas, taking a drive-away car cross-country. While driving from one city to another, he got the idea for a film from The Doors song "Riders on the Storm". He found that the "elements of the song – a killer on the road in a storm plus the cinematic feel of the music – would make a terrific opening for a film". Red had a lot of time to think about the song and it inspired ideas for the story. During his seven-month stay in Austin, he drove a taxi cab and wrote The Hitcher. In 1983, he sent a letter to several Hollywood producers asking if he could send them a copy of the screenplay for The Hitcher. His letter concluded: "It (the story) grabs you by the guts and does not let up and it does not let go. When you read it, you will not sleep for a week. When the movie is made, the country will not sleep for a week". Script development executive David Bombyk received a copy of Red's letter and was intrigued by the description of the film. Red sent him a script that was approximately 190 pages in length (one page traditionally equals one minute of screen time).

=== Screenplay ===
In the original script, an entire family is slaughtered in their station wagon, an eyeball is discovered inside of a hamburger, a woman is tied to a truck and a pole and then torn in half, two teenagers engage in sex, shootings and car crashes. In its original form, Bombyk found the script to be "extremely brutal and extremely gory", but he and personal manager Kip Ohman (who later became co-producers of the film) also saw in it "a level of challenge, intensity and poetry". Bombyk and Ohman were worried about getting it into good enough shape to show their boss, producer Ed Feldman, and his partner, Charles Meeker, and prove to them that it was more than an exploitation film. Bombyk worked with Red via several long-distance phone calls to Texas and eventually the writer moved to Los Angeles. Red agreed to work with Ohman on the script until it was ready to be shown to Feldman and Meeker. They liked the script but wondered, "how could we manage to translate it to the screen without making a slasher movie?" Meeker said.

Feldman and Meeker decided to come on board as executive producers. Ohman and Red spent six months reworking the script, removing most of what Ohman felt was repetitive violence. Once they got it in good enough shape, Ohman gave it back to Bombyk and also to David Madden, a production executive for 20th Century Fox. Within a few days, Madden called back and told them the script was "terrific". The studio was not comfortable with the subject matter but felt that the writing was unique and interesting enough to give the filmmakers a letter-of-intent to distribute the film. This would allow them to get financing and then, once filming was completed, the studio would reimburse them for the budget.

=== Casting ===
The film's producers then went looking for an inexpensive director. Still photographer-turned-cameraman Robert Harmon was given a copy of the script by his agent and called his agent early next morning, telling him that he wanted to do it. In February 1984, Harmon met the producers to talk about the script. He recalled that "even the exact actions that remained in the script were described in much bloodier and gorier detail". The producers were impressed with him and the fact that he also envisioned the film as a Hitchcockian thriller. However, Harmon objected to the eyeball in the hamburger scene and never planned to show the girl getting ripped in half.

In early drafts of the script, John Ryder had been described as skeletal in nature and so slender actors with lean faces were considered, like David Bowie, Sting, Sam Shepard, Harry Dean Stanton, and Terence Stamp. Harmon was set on casting Stamp and even carried around his picture to pitch meetings. Stamp received a copy of the script but turned down the role. Sam Elliott was offered the role but an agreement could not be reached on his salary. Michael Ironside was also considered for the role. Singer mentioned Dutch actor Rutger Hauer. While in L.A. for a short visit, Hauer read the script. Even though he was looking for non-villainous roles, he recalled how the script "really got a hold of me ... I thought, 'If I do one more villain, I should do this.' I couldn't refuse it." The one reservation Hauer had was with the scene where the girl is torn apart and Feldman told him, "you are the bad guy and you'll be the baddest bad guy there ever was!" Red mentioned to Hauer that he had Rolling Stones guitarist Keith Richards in mind when he wrote the part of Ryder. Furthermore, Red felt that the character should have an electronic voice box.

For the role of Jim Halsey, the producers mentioned Matthew Modine, Tom Cruise, and Emilio Estevez. They agreed on C. Thomas Howell and liked his look. At the time, Howell was being more selective with the roles he took and heard that the script was a generic thriller. Harmon personally gave Howell a copy of the script. He could not put it down and "couldn't believe the things that happened to my character in the first 12 pages. I knew I wanted to do it". He also wanted to work with Hauer. Unbeknownst to Hauer, Howell found him "frightening, intimidating, and that he was in a constant state of fear, almost as if he really was John Ryder and I really was Jim Halsey".

Jennifer Jason Leigh agreed to do the film because she wanted to work with Hauer again (they co-starred in Flesh + Blood), and loved the character of Nash because "there was a real person there".

In addition, veteran character actors Billy Green Bush (known for playing ill-fated police officers in Electra Glide in Blue and Jason Goes to Hell: The Final Friday), Gene Davis (known for playing the naked psychopathic killer Warren Stacy in 10 to Midnight), Armin Shimerman (who would later be the voice of General Skarr in The Grim Adventures of Billy & Mandy), and Emmy-winner Henry Darrow, have supporting roles as police officers who pursue Jim Halsey.

=== Pre-production ===
Fox ultimately rejected the project over the budget and saw it as a "straight-out horror movie". Madden also admitted that he would have "argued to soften the movie. There were some people at the studio who thought it was pretty gross". Feldman and Meeker optioned the film themselves, paying Red $25,000. Major studios like Universal Pictures and Warner Bros. passed on it, as did smaller ones like Orion Pictures and New World Pictures. Many executives liked the script but balked at the girl being ripped apart scene. At least two studios were willing to consider making it but only if Harmon was replaced. However, the film's producers had faith in their director and stuck by Harmon.

Independent producer Donna Dubrow heard about The Hitcher while working on another film and to her it sounded like "Duel with a person". When she went to work for Silver Screen Partners/Home Box Office, she contacted Feldman, a former employer, and asked for a copy of the script. She submitted it to her boss, HBO senior vice-president Maurice Singer. He liked it and sent it back to New York to be read by Michael Fuchs, HBO chairman and chief operating officer. They needed Fuchs' approval to get the film made. It would not be easy to convince him because it was not the kind of material that he liked and he did not want to make it. However, Dubrow had to go back to New York on other business and met with Fuchs. She mentioned the script for The Hitcher and pitched the Hitchcockian thriller angle. When she returned to L.A., Singer told her that Fuchs agreed to make the film but with the stipulation that the girl would not be torn apart and the violence would be reduced. The film's budget was set at $5.8 million.

Over the next few months, the filmmakers negotiated two key scenes in the script: the girl getting ripped apart and the eyeball in the hamburger. For the latter scene, Harmon just changed the body part to a finger. As for the former, everyone at HBO/Silver Screen, except Dubrow, wanted it changed. Fuchs did not want the girl to die and Dubrow argued that this would change the story significantly. There were arguments about how the girl should die and Dubrow remembers, "they were trying to make her death not horrible, when – by the nature of the script – it had to be". The studio even suggested softening her death by having a funeral. The filmmakers refused to back down and Silver Screen executives finally relented at the last minute.

=== Filming ===
Principal photography began on February 11, 1985 and lasted for nine weeks, finishing in April 1985.

== Release ==
=== Theatrical ===
Contractually, TriStar Pictures was obligated to distribute any film by HBO/Silver Screen. After TriStar representatives saw an early screening, studio president David Matalon remarked, "it's the best film that we have for 1986". The Hitcher opened in 800 theaters on February 21, 1986, and made $2.1 million during its opening weekend, going on to gross $5.8 million in North America.

=== Home media ===
The Hitcher has been released on VHS, laserdisc and DVD, though the film did not receive a high-definition release until 2019, when a Blu-ray and DVD mediabook set was released by Alive Fernsehjuwelen GmbH. This release presented the film uncut for the first time in Germany, though picture quality was not ideal, as the remaster was sourced from a 35mm German release print, the best film element known to exist at the time. However, British label Second Sight Films, while preparing a release of their own, discovered the original film elements to be held by Warner Bros. Pictures, owners of the HBO Films library, and were ultimately able to complete a 4K restoration of the film supervised by director Harmon. This restored version was released in both 4K and standard Blu-ray formats by Second Sight in the UK on September 30, 2024, and by Warner Bros. Home Entertainment in North America a few weeks later on October 22.

== Reception ==
=== Critical response ===
On the review aggregator website Rotten Tomatoes, The Hitcher holds a 63% approval rating based on 46 critic reviews. The consensus reads: "Its journey is never quite as revelatory as it could be, but The Hitcher stands as a white-knuckle vision of horror, bolstered by Rutger Hauer's menacing performance.” On Metacritic, the film has a weighted average score of 32 out of 100, based on 13 critics, indicating "generally unfavorable reviews". Audiences polled by CinemaScore gave the film an average grade of "C+" on an A+ to F scale.

Roger Ebert of The Chicago Sun-Times awarded The Hitcher a rare zero stars rating, objecting to the way violence was used in the film (particularly the death of Leigh's character); the fact "the killer is not given a viewpoint, a grudge, or indeed even a motive", and how the film's primary dramatic tension is not between good and evil but rather "that there is something sadomasochistic going on between the two men." Gene Siskel also gave the film zero stars, calling it "a nauseating thriller" and "a thinly veiled but more gruesome ripoff of Steven Spielberg's Duel". In her review for The New York Times, Janet Maslin criticized what she saw as the film's lack of intensity and originality, and wrote, "Mr. Harmon, making his feature debut, displays a much surer hand for action than for character, though even some of the action footage here looks meaninglessly overblown". Variety called it "a highly unimaginative slasher ... with a script that has many holes." In his review for The Washington Post, Paul Attanasio wrote, "The script (by Eric Red) is laconic in a dull way, much Cain but hardly able. And Harmon and his cinematographer, John Seale, have shot the movie in such brown murk, you can hardly make anything out. By the end, you're willing to forgive Ryder his worst if someone would just change the light bulb". In his review for The Globe and Mail, Jay Scott interpreted the film as a "slasher movie about gay panic, a nasty piece of homophobic angst for the age of AIDS". A rare positive review came from Newsweek magazine's Jack Kroll who called it, "an odyssey of horror and suspense that's as tightly wound as a garrote and as beautifully designed as a guillotine". Leonard Maltin awarded the film a score of 2 1/2 out of 4 stars (his most frequently used rating), criticizing the film's violence as being "genuinely grisly and unappealing" while also noting that the film wasn't without interest.

While most reviewers criticized the sadistic nature of the film's violence in general and Nash's death in particular, one of the film's producers said that the film's commercial failure was because of a lack of violence and that Nash's death should have been shown: "There's other gore in the movie, other killings, but this is the main one. It's the motivation for the hero. You can't show all the killings we showed and then not show the main one. It's cheating the audience".

Hauer would go on to say that critics misunderstood the film, calling it an allegory in which Ryder represents evil. The film has since been acknowledged as a cult classic and one of Hauer's most iconic roles.

In 2024, filmmaker Christopher Nolan cited it as one of his favorite films, saying "As a teenager, I never questioned the logic of this 80’s chiller, but now it seems mind-bendingly arbitrary plot-wise ... However, it does feature the criminally under-appreciated Rutger Hauer in his finest and most influential Euro-psycho performance this side of Blade Runner."

In 2013, GamesRadar+ named John Ryder one of the "50 Creepiest Movie Psychopaths.

== Other media ==
=== Sequel ===
The film spawned a sequel, The Hitcher II: I've Been Waiting, in 2003, with Howell reprising his role as Jim Halsey.

=== Remake ===
The Hitcher, produced by Michael Bay and directed by Dave Meyers, was released on January 19, 2007, starring Sean Bean as John Ryder, Zachary Knighton as Jim Halsey, and Neal McDonough as Esteridge. The remake eliminated the character of Nash in favor of Jim's girlfriend, Grace Andrews, portrayed by Sophia Bush.

== See also ==
- List of cult films
