= St. Ives (1976 film) =

1976 film by J. Lee Thompson

- Theatrical release poster
- Directed by: J. Lee Thompson
- Written by: Barry Beckerman
- Based on: The Procane Chronicle; 1972 novel by Oliver Bleeck
- Starring: Charles Bronson; John Houseman; Harry Guardino; Harris Yulin; Dana Elcar; Maximilian Schell; Jacqueline Bisset
- Cinematography: Lucien Ballard
- Edited by: Michael F. Anderson
- Music by: Lalo Schifrin
- Distributed by: Warner Bros.
- Release date: July 23, 1976 (Chicago)
- Running time: 94 minutes
- Country: United States
- Language: English
- Box office: $2.3 million

St. Ives is a 1976 American crime thriller film directed by J. Lee Thompson and starring Charles Bronson, John Houseman, Jacqueline Bisset, and Maximilian Schell.

The film was the first of nine collaborations between Bronson and director J. Lee Thompson.

== Plot ==
Abner Procane hires Raymond St. Ives, a crime reporter, novelist, and ex-policeman, to return five journals stolen from his safe.

St. Ives becomes embroiled in the task and the deaths of those involved in the theft. The ledgers are eventually returned minus four pages which detail Procane's plan for a robbery. St. Ives decides to join up with Procane and Janet and pull off the robbery.

== Cast ==
- Charles Bronson as Raymond St. Ives
- John Houseman as Abner Procane
- Jacqueline Bisset as Janet Whistler
- Maximilian Schell as Dr. John Constable
- Burr DeBenning as officer Fran
- Harris Yulin as Det. Carl Oller
- Dana Elcar as Lt. Charlie Blunt
- Harry Guardino as Det. Frank Deal
- Joseph Roman as Seymour
- Jerome Thor as Marshal Chasman
- Michael Lerner as Myron Green
- Robert Englund as Hood
- Jeff Goldblum as Hood
- George Sawaya as Arab Bagman

== Production ==
The novel The Procane Chronicle was published in 1972 written by Ross Thomas under the pen name "Oliver Bleeck". The New York Times said "it should find ready acceptance among readers who like sophistication amid the welter." Film rights were bought in 1972 by Warner Bros. Pictures who announced it would be made by director Dick Richards as the first of a two-picture deal (the other being W.W. and the Dixie Dancekings). Stanley Canter and Sidney Beckerman were to produce.

The film took a number of years to be made. Eventually Charles Bronson signed to star, with J. Lee Thompson to direct. They went on to make eight more films together: The White Buffalo, Caboblanco, 10 to Midnight, Murphy's Law, The Evil That Men Do, Death Wish 4: The Crackdown, Messenger of Death and Kinjite: Forbidden Subjects.

Bronson's wife Jill Ireland often appeared in his films, but not in St Ives. The female lead went to Jacqueline Bisset, who said the film "was less violent than most of Bronson's films, there is more of a romance."

According to Phil Hardy in his book The Overlook Film Encyclopedia: The Gangster Film, Ingmar Bergman visited the set and reported that Charles Bronson was "scandalously underestimated".

The movie is also notable for early film appearances by Michael Lerner, Jeff Goldblum, and Robert Englund. Goldblum played a maniacal street punk, as he did in Death Wish (1974).

== Reception ==
=== Critical response ===
The film's box office performance was described as "modest". On Rotten Tomatoes it has an approval rating of 44% based on 9 reviews.

Roger Ebert of the Chicago Sun-Times gave the film 2 stars out of 4 and called it "an ambitious Charles Bronson picture that looks good but finally doesn't quite work. It's got atmosphere, an interesting cast and some nice action scenes. But it bogs down in those speculations that are the bane of all crime mysteries." Richard Eder of The New York Times wrote a modest recommendation, stating that the film "takes itself neither too seriously nor too lightly. Its occasional wit avoids heavy parody; its action avoids heavy reliance on violence, car chases and other such mechanical paraphernalia ... [Bronson] manages a pleasantly tried skepticism while the bodies fall all around."

Arthur D. Murphy of Variety wrote that the film "merely confirms a point: Eliminate gratuitous, offensive and overdone violence from a dull and plodding film story, and all you've got left is a dull and plodding film." Gene Siskel of the Chicago Tribune gave the film 1.5 stars out of 4 and wrote, "The pace of the film is as lethargic as the acting." He added, "'St. Ives' is the kind of picture that introduces critical off-camera incidents at will. It's a mystery that doesn't play fair. It is neither possible to solve nor worth trying."

Charles Champlin of the Los Angeles Times wrote that the film "is what the trade calls a Charles Bronson starrer. It is also what the trade calls a program picture, competent, familiar and uninspired." Gary Arnold of The Washington Post wrote that the film was "easy enough to string along with in an undemanding mood," though "Charles Bronson never seems remotely plausible as the sort of literary Shamus Raymond St. Ives is purported to be."
