= Joseph Roman =

American actor and gym instructor

- Roman in Quincy, M.E., 1976
- Born: Joseph Spallina Roman; May 23, 1923; May 23, 1927 (sources differ); Philadelphia, Pennsylvania, U.S.
- Died: November 4, 2017; November 5, 2017; February 6, 2018 (sources differ)
- Occupations: Actor, gym instructor
- Years active: 1954–1991

Joseph Spallina Roman (May 23, 1923/1927 – November 4/5, 2017 or February 6, 2018) was an American actor and gym instructor. He was best known for playing Sgt. Brill in the American medical drama television series Quincy, M.E. from 1976 to 1983.

Roman was born in Philadelphia, Pennsylvania. At the age of fifteen, he was a gym instructor for YMCA Philadelphia, and by two years later owned his own gym. He appeared in four films with longtime pal and actor Charles Bronson. He also guest-starred in television programs including Columbo, Studio One and Decoy, and played the recurring role of Maury in the NBC sitcom television series You Again?. He performed in two Broadway plays, Twilight Walk and Infidel Caesar.

Roman died on November 4/5, 2017 or February 6, 2018.

== Filmography ==
=== Film ===
Year	Title	Role	Notes
1991	Bugsy	Moe Sedway	
1986	Murphy's Law	Carl (as Joseph Spallina Roman)	
1979	Love and Bullets	Coroner	
1977	Run for the Roses	TV Interviewer	
1977	The White Buffalo	Silky Smith (as Joe Roman)	
1976	St. Ives	Seymour	

=== Television ===
Year	Title	Role	Notes
1986	You Again?	Maury (as Joseph S. Roman)	3 episodes
1976–1983	Quincy, M.E.	Sgt. Brill	147 episodes
1976	Hunter	Hotel Manager	1 episode
1976	Columbo	Shop Foreman	1 episode
1976	Helter Skelter	The Bailiff (as Joe Roman)	1 episode
1958	Decoy	Frank Bernardino	1 episode
1955	You Are There	Soldier 3	1 episode
1954	The Stranger		1 episode
1952–1954	Studio One	Floor Manager; Sgt. Ray Whitley; Turk	3 episodes
1954	Danger		2 episodes
