= Robert O. Ragland =

- Birth name: Robert Oliver Ragland
- Born: July 3, 1931; Chicago, Illinois
- Died: April 18, 2012 (age 80); Los Angeles, California
- Genres: Film score
- Occupations: Composer; conductor; orchestrator
- Years active: 1969-2004

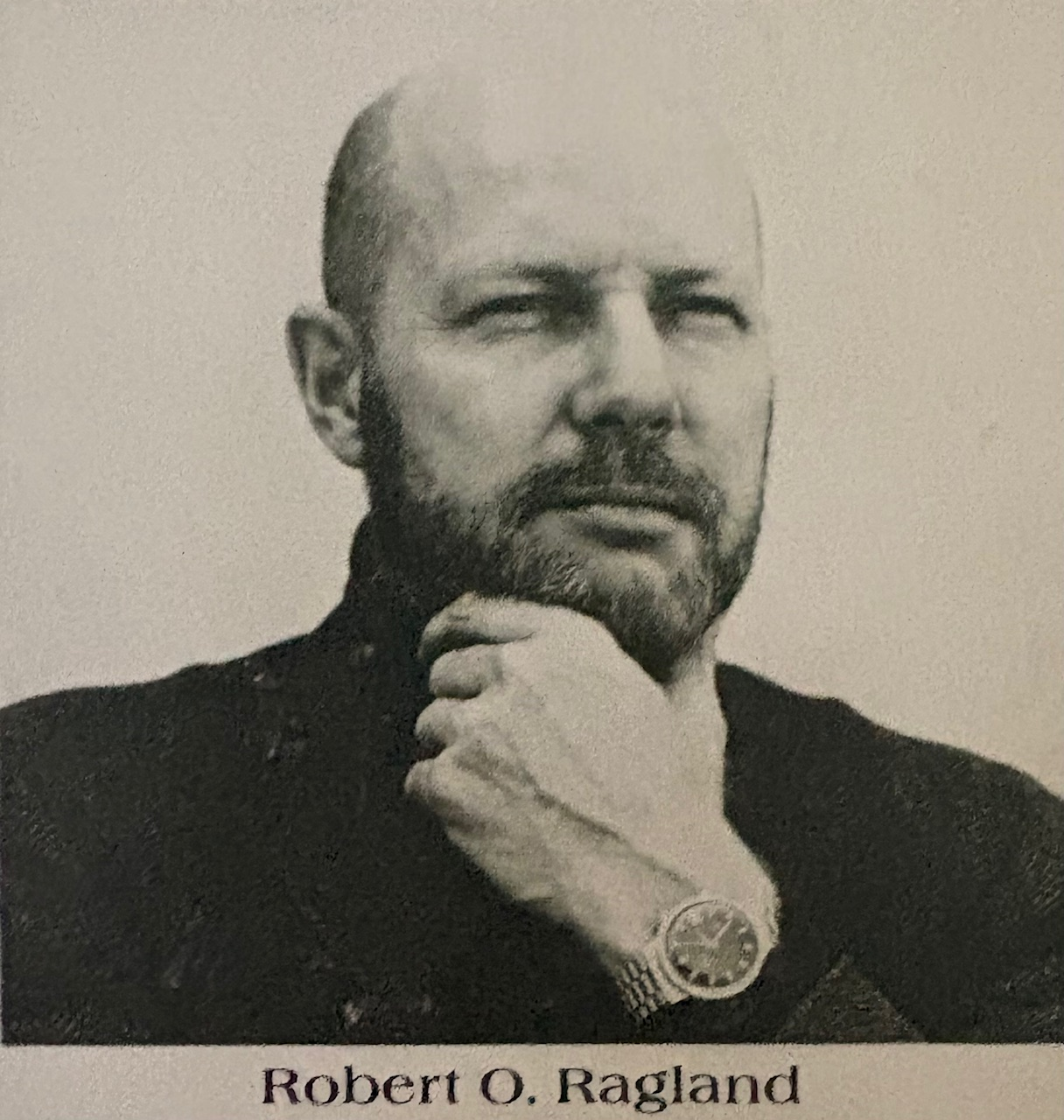
Ragland, circa 1975

Robert Oliver Ragland (July 3, 1931 – April 18, 2012) was an American film score composer, best known for his soundtracks to numerous genre films ranging from blaxploitation (Abby), to horror (Mansion of the Doomed, The Supernaturals), to monster movies (Q, Grizzly), to thrillers (10 to Midnight) and action films (Assassination, Messenger of Death). Throughout his career, he worked with cult filmmakers including William Girdler, Menahem Golan, Larry Cohen, and J. Lee Thompson.

== Biography ==
Ragland was born in Chicago. He attended Northwestern University and also earned degrees at the American Conservatory of Music in Chicago and the University of Music and Performing Arts Vienna. He served as a music arranger for the Dorsey Brothers Orchestra in his early years.

Outside of scoring music for film and television, he often served as a music arranger and orchestrator for singers including Marvin Gaye and Pat Boone and rock bands including Nelson (band) and Dokken. Ragland was married to Martha Montgomery Newman from 1972 to 2005 after the death of her husband, nine-time Oscar winning composer Alfred Newman (composer).

He died, aged 80, on April 18, 2012, at Cedars-Sinai Medical Center in Los Angeles.

== Selected filmography ==
=== Composer ===
- Weekend with the Babysitter (1969)
- Cindy and Donna (1970)
- The Yin and the Yang of Mr. Go (1970)
- The Touch of Satan (1971)
- The Thing with Two Heads (1972)
- The Daring Dobermans (1973)
- Abby (1974)
- Seven Alone (1974)
- Wonder Woman (1975)
- Sharks' Treasure (1975)
- Return to Macon County (1975)
- Grizzly (1976)
- Pony Express Rider (1976)
- Mansion of the Doomed (1976)
- Project: Kill (1976)
- Rooster: Spurs of Death! (1977)
- Jaguar Lives! (1979)
- The Glove (1979)
- Mountain Family Robinson (1979)
- Lovely But Deadly (1981)
- A Time to Die (1982)
- Q (1982)
- 10 to Midnight (1983)
- Evils of the Night (1985)
- The Supernaturals (1986)
- Assassination (1987)
- Prettykill (1987)
- Moon in Scorpio (1987)
- Deep Space (1988)
- Messenger of Death (1988)
- The Fifth Monkey (1990)
- Tarzán (1991-1992)
- No Place to Hide (1993)
- The Raffle (1994)
- The Fear (1995)
- Project Shadowchaser IV (1996)
- Plato's Run (1996)
- Evil Obsession (1997)
- Motel Blue (1997)
- Top of the World (1997)
- Lima: Breaking the Silence (1999)
- Crime and Punishment (2002)
- Downtown: A Street Tale (2004)

=== Actor ===
- The Day of the Locust (1975) - Guest #5
