= The Alien Encounters =

1979 film

- Directed by: James T. Flocker
- Written by: James T. Flocker
- Produced by: David E. Jackson
- Starring: Augie Tribach; Matthew Boston
- Cinematography: Holger Kasper
- Music by: William Loose
- Release date: 1979
- Running time: 92 minutes
- Country: United States
- Language: English

The Alien Encounters is a 1979 science fiction film written and directed by James T. Flocker and starring Augie Tribach and Matthew Boston. It is an American B movie

== Plot ==
An unemployed astronomer loses his job when a radio telescope is destroyed while he is hearing messages from outer space. He then tracks down a scientist who is building a machine to extend life, only to discover the scientist is dead. He visits with the scientist's wife and son, and discovers about the scientist's own encounter with UFOs. An alien probe which has landed on Earth from Barnard's Star. The machine known as a betatron which has remarkable rejuvenating effects.

== Cast ==
Actor	Role
Augie Tribach	Allan Reed
Matthew Boston	Steve Arlyn
Phil Catalli	Wally
Bonnie Henry	Elaine Stafford
Patricia Hunt	Mrs. Arlyn
Amy Ballor	Melissa
Skye Tollefson	Laurie
Steve Abbott	Rancher
Chris Love-Jackson	Susan Reed
Lukas Jackson	Luke Reed
Gene Davis	Man In Black #1
Mark Purdy	Man In Black #2

== Reception ==
Described by leading science fiction author David Wingrove in his Science Fiction Source Book as a "Deathly dull B-movie UFO story with dire effects and no real encounters at all...Endless desert scenes and interminable talk-overs disguise crank concerns of writer/director James T. Flocker", the film received generally poor reviews. Fantastic Movie Musings found the movie to be okay for its low budget, that it has some interesting points.

== Production ==
Filmed in and around the Calico Mountains including Mule Canyon Road and scenes on the lake bed, off Ghost Town Road and Interstate 15, 7 miles north of Barstow, California.
