= Rex Burns =

American author (born 1935)

- Born: Raoul Sehler; 1935 (age 90–91); San Diego, California, U.S.
- Education: Stanford University; University of Minnesota
- Writing career
- Genre: Crime fiction
- Notable work: The Alvarez Journal
- Notable awards: Edgar Award for best first novel, 1976
- Website: rexburns.com

Rex Burns (born 1935 in San Diego, California), born Raoul Stephen Sehler, is an American author of crime fiction. He has published numerous books, stories, articles, and reviews.

== Personal life ==
Burns graduated from Stanford University with a degree in English and creative writing. He went on to pursue a PhD in American Studies at the University of Minnesota, but his studies were temporarily interrupted by a term in the US Marine Corps, where he rose to the rank of Captain. Until 2000, when he retired, Burns was a professor of American literature at the University of Colorado Denver.

== Career ==
At the age of 40, Burns began writing novels. His first, The Alvarez Journal, won the Edgar Award for best first novel. The book introduced Gabriel Wager, a hard-drinking Mexican-American detective with the Denver police force. The Wager series lasted for ten more books, one of which (The Avenging Angel) was adapted into the 1988 film Messenger of Death, starring Charles Bronson.

== Bibliography ==
To date, Burns has written sixteen novels in three different series (plus another novel under the pseudonym "Tom Sehler").

Gabriel Wager Series

1. The Alvarez Journal (1975)
2. The Farnsworth Score (1977)
3. Speak for the Dead (1978)
4. Angle of Attack (1979)
5. The Avenging Angel (1983)
6. Strip Search (1984)
7. Ground Money (1986)
8. The Killing Zone (1988)
9. Endangered Species (1993)
10. Blood Line (1995)
11. The Leaning Land (1997)

Devlin Kirk Series

1. Suicide Season (1987)
2. Parts Unknown (1990)
3. Body Guard (1991)

Touchstone Agency Mysteries

1. Body Slam (2014)
2. Crude Carrier (2014)

As "Tom Sehler"

- When Reason Sleeps (1991)

Fables

1. The Frogs of Sawhill Ponds, Vol. 1
2. The Frogs of Sawhill Ponds, Vol. 2

Non-fiction

- Success in America: The Yeoman Dream and the Industrial Revolution (1976)
- Crime Classics: The Mystery Story from Poe to the Present (1990)
