= Eugene M. Davis =

American actor

Eugene M. Davis (born January 27, 1952) is an American actor known for playing the psychotic killer Warren Stacy in the 1983 film 10 to Midnight with Charles Bronson; he also played a killer in another Bronson vehicle, 1988's Messenger of Death. His other credits include the psychological thriller Fear X (2003) and a role as a cross-dressing police informant in the Al Pacino movie Cruising (1980).

== Personal life ==
He is the brother of actor Brad Davis and the son of dentist Dr. Eugene Davis and Anne Creel Davis. He was raised in Titusville, Florida, attended and graduated from Titusville High School.

== Filmography ==
Year	Title	Role	Notes
1974-1980	The Rockford Files	Mickey Long	2 episodes
1979	The Alien Encounters	'Man In Black' #1	TV movie
1980	Cruising	DaVinci	
1980	Night Games	Timothy	
1983	10 to Midnight	Warren Stacy	
1986	The Hitcher	Trooper Dodge	
1988	Black Eagle	Steve Henderson	
1988	Messenger of Death	Junior Assassin	
1988	War and Remembrance	Telephone Talker (Devilfish)	1 episode
1988	Honor Bound	Chester Wind River	
1992	Universal Soldier	Lieutenant	
1992	Stay Tuned	Frankensteinfeld	
1997	The Relic	Martini	
2000	Nostradamus	Bill MacNulty	
2002	Santa, Jr.	Digregorio	TV movie
2003	Fear X	Ed	
2004	Just Desserts	Wesley King	TV movie
2005	Annie's Point	Pawnshop Owner	TV movie
2006	Hidden Places	Tom Walker	TV movie
2008	Shark Swarm	Sheriff Dexter Murray	TV movie
2009	Meteor	Whitaker	Episode #1.2
