= Eddie Garrett =

American actor (1927–2010)

- Born: Edward Gehrt; November 19, 1927
- Died: May 13, 2010 (aged 82)

Edward Gehrt (November 19, 1927 – May 13, 2010) was an American actor best known for his role on the NBC television series, Quincy, M.E., in which he portrayed a silver-haired photographer for the Los Angeles coroner's office in more than 100 episodes of the series.

Garrett was born as Edward Gehrt on November 19, 1927, to parents, Robert and Anna Gehrt. He was raised in Milwaukee, Wisconsin He became interested in acting by doing impressions of Bing Crosby for his parents. Ultimately, Garrett learned more than 100 voices and impressions, which he would later use in a nightclub act that lasted more than 16 years.

Both of Garrett's parents died within nine months of each other when he was 13 years old. He was sent to live with aunts, first in Sacramento, California and then to Los Angeles.

His film credits included a role as a bartender in the 1977 film, Looking for Mr. Goodbar, opposite Diane Keaton and a police officer in the 1971 film, Dirty Harry, starring Clint Eastwood. On television, Garrett was best known for playing a coroner's office photographer in more than 100 episodes of Quincy, M.E. throughout the 1980s. His other television credits included roles on Medical Center, Batman (episode 39) and Ironside. Garrett also appeared on The Odd Couple, opposite Jack Klugman, a personal friend.

In 2006, Garrett published a book, I Saw Stars ... In the 40s and 50s. His book included more than one hundred photographs which he had taken of actors as a high school student.

Garrett died of a stroke at the Eisenhower Medical Center in Rancho Mirage, California, on May 13, 2010, at the age of 82. He was survived by his wife, Maggie Hartshorn, whom he married in 1957, and two stepdaughters, Carla Jean Hartshorn and Susan Licursi.

== Partial filmography ==
- Don't Make Waves (1967) – Sheriff (uncredited)
- Speedway (1968) – Passenger in Elevator (uncredited)
- Dirty Harry (1971) – Policeman (uncredited)
- Mame (1974) – Party Guest (uncredited)
- Jacqueline Susann's Once Is Not Enough (1975) – Maitre d' at Polo Lounge
- Harry and Walter Go to New York (1976) – Restaurant Patron (uncredited)
- New York City (1977) – Reporter
- Looking for Mr. Goodbar (1977) – Bartender
- Meteor (1979) – Reporter (uncredited)
