= List of Quincy, M.E. episodes =

This is a list of episodes from Quincy, M.E., an American crime investigation and mystery series. It was originally broadcast on NBC from October 3, 1976, to May 11, 1983. The show stars Jack Klugman as a medical examiner in Los Angeles who solves crimes and deals with social issues of the time.

Over the course of eight seasons, 148 episodes were produced.

== Series overview ==
As of this writing, all seven seasons of this series have been released on DVD.

Season	Episodes	Originally released	
Season	Episodes	First released	Last released
1	4	October 3, 1976	January 2, 1977
2	13	February 4, 1977	May 27, 1977
3	20	September 16, 1977	March 10, 1978
4	23	September 21, 1978	April 12, 1979
5	22	September 20, 1979	April 30, 1980
6	18	September 16, 1980	May 6, 1981
7	24	October 28, 1981	May 12, 1982
8	24	September 29, 1982	May 11, 1983

== Episodes ==
=== Season 1 (1976–77) ===
No. overall	No. in season	Title	Directed by	Written by	Original release date	Prod. code
1	1	"Go Fight City Hall... to the Death!"	E.W. Swackhamer	Glen A. Larson & Lou Shaw	October 3, 1976	45572
2	2	"Who's Who in Neverland"	Steven H. Stern	Story by : Richard M. Powell; Teleplay by : Michael Kozoll & Richard M. Powell	October 10, 1976	45568
3	3	"A Star is Dead"	Noel Black	Lou Shaw & Michael Kozoll & Glen A. Larson	November 28, 1976	45570
4	4	"Hot Ice, Cold Hearts"	Bruce Kessler	Sean Baine	January 2, 1977	45571

=== Season 2 (1977) ===
No. overall	No. in season	Title	Directed by	Written by	Original release date	Prod. code
5	1	"Snake Eyes"	Joel Oliansky	Story by : Lou Shaw; Teleplay by : Joel Oliansky & Michael Sloan	February 4, 1977	45573/45574
6	2	"Snake Eyes"	Joel Oliansky	Story by : Lou Shaw; Teleplay by : Joel Oliansky & Michael Sloan	February 4, 1977	45573/45574
7	3	"...The Thigh Bone's Connected to the Knee Bone..."	Alex March	Story by : Tony Lawrence & Lou Shaw; Teleplay by : Lou Shaw	February 11, 1977	45569
8	4	"Visitors in Paradise"	Ivan Dixon	Michael Sloan	February 18, 1977	46906
9	5	"The Two Sides of Truth"	Ron Satlof	Gene Thompson	February 25, 1977	46909
10	6	"Hit and Run at Danny's"	Alvin Ganzer	Gregory S. Dinallo	March 11, 1977	46904
11	7	"Has Anybody Here Seen Quincy?"	Steven H. Stern	Michael Sloan & Glen A. Larson	March 18, 1977	46916
12	8	"A Good Smack in the Mouth"	Jackie Cooper	Story by : Glen A. Larson & Jack Klugman; Teleplay by : Gregory S. Dinallo	April 15, 1977	46923
13	9	"The Hot Dog Murder"	Alex March	B.W. Sandefur	April 22, 1977	46907
14	10	"An Unfriendly Radiance"	Corey Allen	Rudolph Bochert	April 29, 1977	46911
15	11	"Sullied Be Thy Name"	Jackie Cooper	Story by : Gregory S. Dinallo; Teleplay by : Gregory S. Dinallo & Irving Pearlberg	May 6, 1977	46926
16	12	"Valleyview"	Ron Satlof	Story by : Susan Woolen; Teleplay by : Susan Woolen & Irving Pearlberg	May 13, 1977	46908
17	13	"Let Me Light the Way"	David Moessinger	Story by : David Moessinger & Carole Saraceno; Teleplay by : David Moessinger	May 27, 1977	46925

=== Season 3 (1977–78) ===
No. overall	No. in season	Title	Directed by	Written by	Original release date	Prod. code
18	1	"No Deadly Secret"	Jackie Cooper	Wallace Ware	September 16, 1977	48011
19	2	"A Blow to the Head... a Blow to the Heart"	Corey Allen	Mann Rubin	September 23, 1977	48004
20	3	"A Dead Man's Truth"	Vic Morrow	Adrian Leeds	September 30, 1977	48007
21	4	"A Question of Time"	Ray Danton	Irv Pearlberg	October 14, 1977	48005
22	5	"Death Casts a Vote"	Ron Staff	William Froug	October 21, 1977	48009
23	6	"Tissue of Truth"	Ray Danton	Max McClellan	October 28, 1977	48013
24	7	"Holding Pattern"	Ron Satlof	Story by : Adam Singer; Teleplay by : Robert Hamner	November 4, 1977	48017
25	8	"Main Man"	Ray Danton	S : Ray Danton; T : Irving Pearlberg	November 11, 1977	48026
26	9	"The Hero Syndrome"	Gerald Mayer	Albert Aley	November 18, 1977	48021
27	10	"Touch of Death"	Alexander Singer	Joe Hyams & Pat Strong	December 2, 1977	48024
28	11	"The Deadly Connection"	Alex March	Sheldon Stark	December 9, 1977	48003
29	12	"Last of the Dinosaurs"	Ray Danton	Leonard Stadd	December 16, 1977	48020
30	13	"Crib Job"	Alex March	Milton S. Gelman	January 6, 1978	48022
31	14	"Matters of Life and Death"	Paul Krasny	Albert Aley	January 20, 1978	48030
32	15	"Passing"	David Alexander	S : Lois Gibson; T : Samuel D. Shamsharoff; S/T : Mann Rubin	January 27, 1978	48023
33	16	"Accomplice to Murder"	Paul Krasny	Frank Telford	February 3, 1978	48031
34	17	"Ashes to Ashes"	Herb Wallerstein	S : Charles McDaniel; T : Max Hodge	February 10, 1978	48028
35	18	"Gone But Not Forgotten"	Paul Krasny	Tom Sawyer & Reyn Parke	February 17, 1978	48033
36	19	"Double Death"	Robert Douglas	Albert Aley	March 3, 1978	48037
37	20	"Requiem for the Living"	Rowe Wallerstein	Story by : Ray Danton; Teleplay by : Irving Pearlberg	March 10, 1978	48039

=== Season 4 (1978–79) ===
No. overall	No. in season	Title	Directed by	Written by	Original release date
38	1	"The Last Six Hours"	Corey Allen	Steve Greenberg & Aubrey Solomon	September 21, 1978
39	2	"Speed Trap"	Ron Satlof	S : Pamela Glasser; T : Steve Greenberg & Aubrey Solomon	October 12, 1978
40	3	"A Test for Living"	Ron Satlof	T : Patrick Mathews & James Rosin; S/T : Jack Klugman	October 19, 1978
41	4	"Death by Good Intentions"	Ron Satlof	S : Howard Dimsdale & Michael Halperin; T : Robert Crais	October 26, 1978
42	5	"Images"	Ray Danton	S : Ray Danton; T : Steve Greenberg & Aubrey Solomon	November 2, 1978
43	6	"Even Odds"	Ray Danton	Pamela Glasser	November 9, 1978
44	7	"Dead and Alive"	Jim Benson	James Rosin	November 16, 1978
45	8	"No Way to Treat a Body"	Ron Satlof	Robert Crais & Bill Seal	November 30, 1978
46	9	"A Night to Raise the Dead"	Gene Nelson	S : Peter J. Thompson; T : Michael Halperin	December 7, 1978
47	10	"A Question of Death"	Ray Danton	S : Peter J. Thompson & Robert Crais; S/T : Steve Greenberg & Aubrey Solomon	January 4, 1979
48	11	"House of No Return"	Harvey S. Laidman	S : Deborah Klugman; T : Aubrey Solomon; S/T : Steve Greenberg	January 11, 1979
49	12	"A Small Circle of Friends"	Peter J. Thompson	S : Jack Morton; S/T : Steve Greenberg & Aubrey Solomon	January 18, 1979
50	13	"The Depth of Beauty"	Ray Danton	S : Barbara Evans; S/T : Robert Crais	January 25, 1979
51 52	14 15	"Walk Softly Through the Night: Parts 1 & 2"	Paul Krasny	David Moessinger	February 1, 1979
53	16	"Aftermath"	Tony Mordente	S : Peter J. Thompson; T : Steve Greenberg & Aubrey Solomon	February 7, 1979
54	17	"Dark Angel"	Ray Danton	Robert Crais	February 7, 1979
55	18	"Physician, Heal Thyself"	Corey Allen	Steve Greenberg & Aubrey Solomon	February 22, 1979
56	19	"Promises to Keep"	Harvey S. Laidman	S : Jack Klugman; T : Erich Collier	March 1, 1979
57	20	"Semper-Fidelis"	Tony Mordente	S : Maurice Klugman; T : Robert Crais	March 15, 1979
58	21	"An Ounce of Prevention"	Kenneth Gilbert	S : Larry Tuch & Sol Weisel; S/T : Steve Greenberg & Aubrey Solomon & Robert Crais	March 22, 1979
59	22	"The Death Challenge"	Ron Satlof	Richard M. Bluel & Pat Fielder	March 24, 1979
60	23	"The Eye of the Needle"	Ron Satlof	T : Robert Crais; S/T : A.L. Christopher	April 12, 1979

=== Season 5 (1979–80) ===
No. overall	No. in season	Title	Directed by	Written by	Original release date
61	1	"No Way to Treat a Flower"	Ray Danton	Jeff Freilich & Christopher Trumbo	September 20, 1979
62	2	"Dead Last"	Ray Danton	W.T. Zacha & E. Nick Alexander	September 27, 1979
63	3	"By the Death of a Child"	Alan Cooke	Robert Crais	October 4, 1979
64	4	"Never a Child"	Ray Danton	Sam Egan	October 11, 1979
65	5	"Hot Ice"	Ray Danton	S : Ralph Wallace Davenport; T : Robert Crais	October 18, 1979
66	6	"Sweet Land of Liberty"	Robert Loggia	Erich Collier	October 25, 1979
67	7	"Mode of Death"	Rod Holcomb	S : Deborah Klugman; T : Steve Greenberg & Aubrey Solomon	November 1, 1979
68	8	"Nowhere to Run"	Jeffrey Hayden	Linda Elstad & Sam Egan	November 8, 1979
69	9	"The Money Plague"	Rod Holcomb	S : Allan Cole & Chris Bunch; T : Sam Egan	November 15, 1979
70	10	"For the Benefit of My Patients"	Jeremiah Morris	S : Phillip Edelman; S/T : Erich Collier	November 22, 1979
71	11	"Murder by S.O.P."	Paul Krasny	Robert Crais	November 29, 1979
72	12	"Honor Thy Elders"	Ray Danton	Sam Egan	January 10, 1980
73	13	"Diplomatic Immunity"	Ray Danton	Steve Greenberg & Gregory Crossman	January 17, 1980
74	14	"Riot"	Rod Holcomb	Allan Cole & Chris Bunch	January 31, 1980
75	15	"Cover-up"	Paul Stanley	Michael Halperin	February 7, 1980
76	16	"Unhappy Hour"	Ray Danton	Sam Egan	February 14, 1980
77	17	"The Winning Edge"	Georg Fenady	William Cairncross & Lester William Berke	February 21, 1980
78	18	"New Blood"	John Peyser	Jeri Taylor	February 28, 1980
79	19	"T.K.O."	Lawrence Doheny	S : Deborah Klugman; S/T : Sam Egan	March 13, 1980
80	20	"The Final Gift"	Georg Fenady	T : R. A. Cinader; S/T : Marjorie Worcester	March 20, 1980
81	21	"Deadly Arena"	Jeffrey Hayden	S : R. A. Cinader; S/T : Sam Egan	March 27, 1980
82	22	"No Way to Treat a Patient"	Georg Fenady	R. A. Cinader	April 30, 1980

=== Season 6 (1980–81) ===
No. overall	No. in season	Title	Directed by	Written by	Original release date
83	1	"Last Rights"	Georg Fenady	Sam Egan	September 16, 1980
84	2	"A Matter of Principle"	Ron Satlof	Steve Greenberg & Aubrey Solomon	November 12, 1980
85	3	"Last Day, First Day"	Leslie H. Martinson	Preston Wood	November 19, 1980
86	4	"The Night Killer"	Jeffrey Hayden	Jeri Taylor	November 26, 1980
87	5	"The Hope of Elkwood"	Richard Benedict	S : James Rosin; T : Michael Braverman	December 3, 1980
88	6	"Welcome to Paradise Palms"	Georg Fenady	S : Jon Dalke & Ray Danton; T : David Moessinger	December 17, 1980
89	7	"By Their Faith"	Ron Satlof	Erich Collier	January 7, 1981
90	8	"Stain of Guilt"	Ray Danton	Sam Egan	January 14, 1981
91	9	"Dear Mummy"	Georg Fenady	Michael Braverman	January 21, 1981
92	10	"Headhunter"	Michael Vejar	Fred J. McKnight	February 4, 1981
93	11	"Scream to the Skies"	Ron Satlof	Michael Braverman	February 11, 1981
94	12	"Jury Duty"	Georg Fenady	Preston Wood	February 18, 1981
95	13	"Who Speaks for the Children"	Georg Fenady	Michael Braverman	February 25, 1981
96	14	"Seldom Silent, Never Heard"	Jeffrey Hayden	Sam Egan, Maurice Klugman	March 4, 1981
97	15	"Of All Sad Words"	Bob Bender	Jeri Taylor	March 11, 1981
98	16	"To Kill in Plain Sight"	Ray Austin	S : Chris Bunch & Allan Cole; T : Geoffrey Fischer	March 18, 1981
99	17	"Sugar and Spice"	Georg Fenady	Jeri Taylor	April 1, 1981
100	18	"Vigil of Fear"	Bob Bender	S : Steve Greenberg & Aubrey Solomon; S/T : Leo Garen	May 6, 1981

=== Season 7 (1981–82) ===
No. overall	No. in season	Title	Directed by	Written by	Original release date
101	1	"Memories of Allison"	Georg Fenady	Sam Egan	October 28, 1981
102	2	"The Golden Hour"	Georg Fenady	Sebastian Milito, Deborah Klugman	November 4, 1981
103	3	"Slow Boat to Madness: Part 1"	Daniel Haller	Sam Egan, Marc Scott Taylor	November 11, 1981
104	4	"Slow Boat to Madness: Part 2"	Daniel Haller	Sam Egan, Marc Scott Taylor	November 18, 1981
105	5	"D.U.I."	Georg Fenady	Michael Braverman	December 2, 1981
106	6	"For Want of a Horse"	Ray Danton	Jeri Taylor	December 9, 1981
107	7	"Gentle Into That Good Night"	David Moessinger	Jeri Taylor	December 16, 1981
108	8	"Dead Stop"	Ray Danton	Linda Cowgill	December 23, 1981
109	9	"Bitter Pill"	Georg Fenady	Sam Egan, David Chomsky	January 2, 1982
110	10	"Guns Don't Die"	Bob Bender	Jeri Taylor	January 13, 1982
111	11	"When Luck Ran Out"	Georg Fenady	Paul Haggard Jr., Jo Lynne Michael	January 20, 1982
112	12	"Smoke Screen"	Georg Fenady	Michael McGreevey	January 27, 1982
113	13	"For Love of Joshua"	David Moessinger	Michael Braverman	February 3, 1982
114	14	"Into the Murdering Mind"	Georg Fenady	Michael Braverman; Linda J. Cowgill	February 10, 1982
115	15	"To Clear the Air"	Lester Wm. Berke	Sam Egan	February 17, 1982
116	16	"The Shadow of Death"	Georg Fenady	Jeri Taylor	February 24, 1982
117	17	"The Flight of the Nightingale"	William Cairncross	Gene Church, E. Paul Edwards	March 3, 1982
118	18	"Stolen Tears"	Georg Fenady	Sam Egan	March 17, 1982
119	19	"The Face of Fear"	Bob Bender	Michael Braverman	March 24, 1982
120	20	"Expert in Murder"	Michael J. Kane	Sam Egan, Marc Scott Taylor	March 31, 1982
121	21	"The Unquiet Grave"	Georg Fenady	Jeri Taylor	April 7, 1982
122	22	"The Last of Leadbottom"	Michael Braverman	Michael Braverman	April 28, 1982
123	23	"Deadly Protection"	Paul Krasny	Michael McGreevey, Fred Long	May 5, 1982
124	24	"The Mourning After"	Jeri Taylor	Sam Egan	May 12, 1982

=== Season 8 (1982–83) ===
No. overall	No. in season	Title	Directed by	Written by	Original release date
125	1	"Baby Rattlesnakes"	Georg Fenady	Jeri Taylor	September 29, 1982
126	2	"Ghost of a Chance"	Ray Danton	Steve Greenberg, Aubrey Solomon	October 6, 1982
127	3	"Give Me Your Weak"	Georg Fenady	Sam Egan	October 27, 1982
128	4	"Dying for a Drink"	Georg Fenady	Michael Braverman	November 3, 1982
129	5	"Unreasonable Doubt"	Richard Benedict	Lee Sheldon	November 10, 1982
130	6	"Sleeping Dogs"	Georg Fenady	Preston Wood	November 17, 1982
131	7	"Science for Sale"	Ray Danton	S : Diana Marcus & Chris Abbott & Nancy Faulkner; T : Erich Collier	November 24, 1982
132	8	"Next Stop, Nowhere"	Ray Danton	Sam Egan	December 1, 1982
133	9	"Across the Line"	Georg Fenady	Fred McKnight	December 8, 1982
134	10	"Sword of Honor, Blade of Death"	Ray Danton	Michael Braverman	December 15, 1982
135	11	"The Law Is a Fool"	Georg Fenady	S : Jack Klugman; T : David Karp	January 5, 1983
136	12	"Guilty Until Proven Innocent"	Ray Danton	Allison Hock	January 12, 1983
137	13	"Cry for Help"	Ray Austin	Jeri Taylor	January 19, 1983
138	14	"A Loss for Words"	Georg Fenady	Sam Egan	January 26, 1983
139	15	"Beyond the Open Door"	Georg Fenady	David Moessinger	February 2, 1983
140	16	"On Dying High"	Ray Danton	Michael Braverman	February 9, 1983
141	17	"Quincy's Wedding: Part 1"	David Moessinger	Jeri Taylor	February 16, 1983
142	18	"Quincy's Wedding: Part 2"	Jeri Taylor	Jeri Taylor	February 23, 1983
143	19	"Murder on Ice"	Mel Ferber	Lee Sheldon	March 9, 1983
144	20	"Women of Valor"	Georg Fenady	Sebastian Milito, Deborah Klugman	March 16, 1983
145	21	"Suffer the Little Children"	William Cairncross	David Karp	March 23, 1983
146	22	"An Act of Violence"	Michael Braverman	Michael Braverman	April 27, 1983
147	23	"Whatever Happened to Morris Perlmutter?"	Sam Egan	Sam Egan	May 4, 1983
148	24	"The Cutting Edge"	Georg Fenady	Jeri Taylor	May 11, 1983
