= Quincy, M.E. =

American mystery medical drama TV series (1976–1983)

- Genre: Medical drama; Mystery; Forensic pathology procedural
- Created by: Glen A. Larson; Lou Shaw
- Starring: Jack Klugman; Garry Walberg; John S. Ragin; Val Bisoglio; Robert Ito; Joseph Roman; Eddie Garrett; Marc Scott Taylor; Anita Gillette
- Theme music composer: Glen A. Larson & Stu Phillips
- Opening theme: Original "Untitled" Score
- Country of origin: United States
- No. of seasons: 8
- No. of episodes: 148 (list of episodes)

Production
- Running time: 60 min (seasons 2–8; also syndication); 90 min (season 1)
- Production companies: Glen A. Larson Productions; Universal Television

Original release
- Network: NBC
- Release: October 3, 1976 – May 11, 1983

Quincy, M.E. (also called Quincy) is an American mystery medical drama television series from Universal Studios that was broadcast on NBC from October 3, 1976, to May 11, 1983. Jack Klugman starred in the title role as a Los Angeles County medical examiner who routinely engages in police investigations.

Possibly inspired by the book Where Death Delights by Marshall Houts, a former FBI agent, the show also resembled the earlier Canadian television series Wojeck, broadcast by CBC Television. John Vernon, who played the Wojeck title role, later guest-starred in the third-season episode "Requiem for the Living". Quincy's character is loosely modeled on Los Angeles' "Coroner to the Stars" Thomas Noguchi.

Quincy was originally broadcast as 90-minute telefilms as part of the NBC Sunday Mystery Movie rotation in the autumn of 1976, alongside Columbo, McCloud and McMillan (formerly McMillan & Wife). The series proved popular enough that after four episodes of Quincy, M.E. were broadcast during the 1976–1977 season in the extended format, Quincy was spun off into its own weekly one-hour series without a typical 60-minute pilot. Instead, a two-hour episode kicked off a thirteen-episode shortened run of the series, which concluded the 1976–1977 season, while NBC canceled the Mystery Movie format in the spring of 1977.

Many of the guest actors in Quincy appeared in multiple episodes in different roles, a frequent occurrence on several Glen A. Larson TV programs. Writers Lou Shaw and Tony Lawrence received an Edgar Award from the Mystery Writers of America in 1978 for the second-season episode "...The Thigh Bone's Connected to the Knee Bone...".

== Synopsis ==
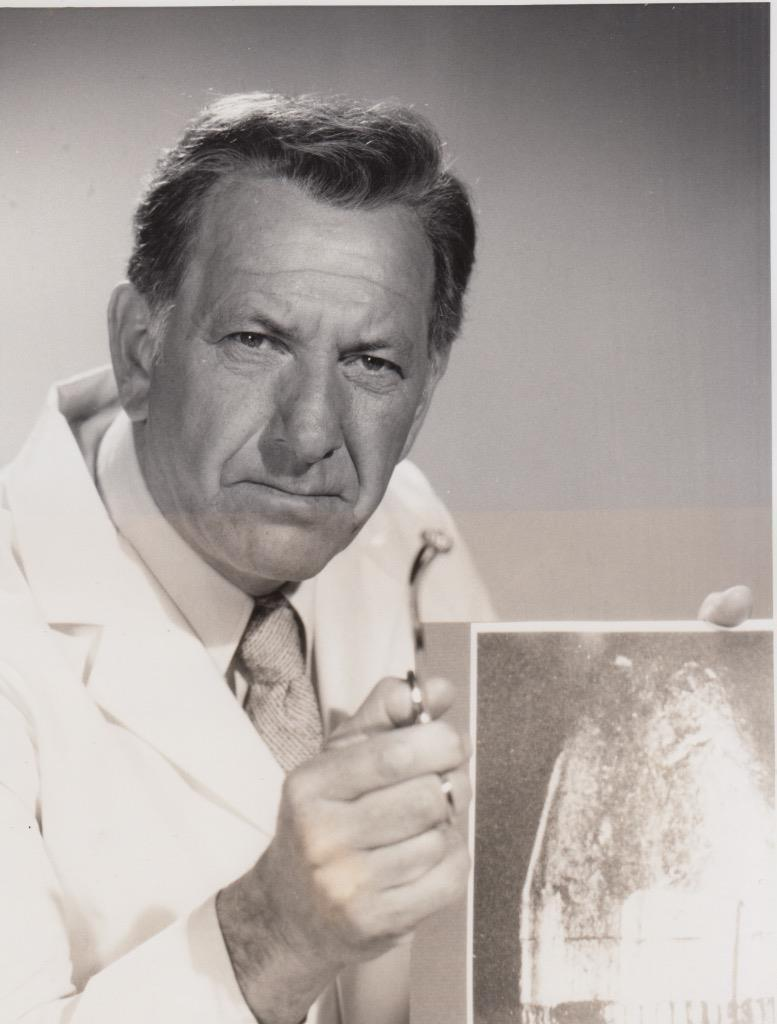
Jack Klugman as Quincy

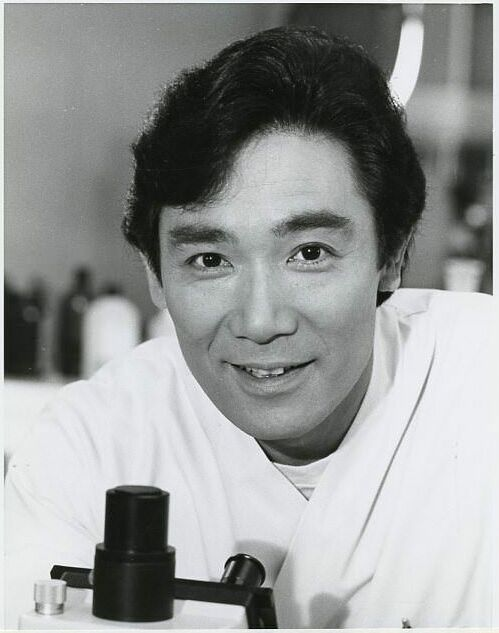
Robert Ito as Sam Fujiyama

The series starred Jack Klugman as Dr. Quincy, a resolute, excitable, ethical and highly proficient Medical Examiner (forensic pathologist) for the Los Angeles County Coroner's Office, working to ascertain facts about and reasons for possible suspicious deaths. His colleagues, friends and wife all address him by his surname or the shortened "Quince". The character's first name was never given, although in the third-season episode "Accomplice to Murder", his name is shown on a business card as "R. Quincy"; and in early episodes, the name "Dr. R. Quincy" appears on his office door. (It appears not even Klugman himself knew what Quincy's first name was supposed to have been; whenever he was asked, he would reply "Doctor!")

While engaged in para-police investigations, Quincy frequently comes into conflict with his boss, Dr. Robert Asten (John S. Ragin), and the police, in particular LAPD Homicide Lieutenant Frank Monahan (Garry Walberg). Quincy and Asten would usually tussle about halfway into an episode, after which time Quincy would successfully solve the case, outsmarting the LAPD and his argumentative boss. Both Monahan and Asten frequently had their own theories about a particular case, which were usually at odds with Quincy's deductions. In early episodes, Quincy's relationship with both men was often volatile and nearly adversarial; this changed markedly in later episodes, where Quincy appears to have much closer professional and personal relationships with the two. Frequently, however, the entire investigation would be handled by Quincy with little or no cooperation from the police. Quincy is assisted in the lab by the faithful and adept Sam Fujiyama (Robert Ito).

It is revealed in the episode "The Last of Leadbottom" that Quincy is a retired Captain in the US Navy and remains in the Naval Reserve. In the episode "Crib Job", he notes he originally wanted to be a railroad engineer, after revealing a number of facts about the dangers of the occupation. A well-liked man, Quincy lives on a sailboat permanently moored in Marina Del Rey, California, and frequents Danny's, a restaurant and lounge at the marina owned by his friend Danny Tovo (Val Bisoglio).

Quincy is quite successful with women. He was once married, but lost his wife, Helen, to cancer. In the Mystery Movie installments and earliest first-season episodes, Quincy has a regular girlfriend, an airline flight attendant named Lee Potter (portrayed by Lynnette Mettey) who sometimes accompanies him on his cases (such as in "...The Thighbone's Connected to the Knee Bone..."). After Lee, Quincy dated several women until near the end of the seventh season, when he remarries (Dr. Emily Hanover, played by Anita Gillette who had previously portrayed Helen in a flashback) and sells the sailboat in the episode "Quincy's Wedding".

Quincy occasionally drives an antique car (which is shown in Season 4, Episode 1 to be an antique Packard Town Car), but friends sometimes ask why he drives his "work car" (the county coroner's removal vehicle, a 1976 AMC Matador station wagon (California reg plate: 999853) in the first two seasons and a 1975 Ford LTD station wagon for the rest of the series) on his day off. In reply to the queries, Quincy claims that his car is being repaired.

As originally conceived as part of NBC's Mystery Movie format, the early seasons of Quincy, M.E. contained elements of whodunit or howcatchem and focused primarily on Quincy's own criminal investigation; a typical episode would find Quincy determining the actual murderer (instead of the LAPD) or the true cause of a suspicious or unusual death. Later seasons' episodes began to introduce themes of social responsibilities; Quincy would find himself conducting his own para-police investigation that reveals situations such as a disreputable plastic surgeon and the reasons his botched surgeries are not stopped, flaws in drunk driving laws, lax airline safety, dumping of hazardous waste, the proliferation of handguns, autism, anorexia nervosa, hazing, teenage alcoholism, Tourette's syndrome, orphan drugs, and a controversial episode about the dangers of punk rock.

Quincy, M.E. was one of the first American dramatic series to use a format like this to further a social agenda. Klugman himself even came to testify before the US Congress about some of these issues (such as orphan drugs in 1982), describing what he had learned about a difficult or complex social concern as a result of its use in one of the show's episodes.

In 2008, Klugman sued NBC, asserting that the network had concealed profits from the show which were owed to him.

== Legacy and influence ==
The Canadian series Wojeck (1966–68) and especially the British series The Expert (1968–76) were centered around forensic investigators and routinely showed detailed forensic investigations long before Quincy was even conceived. However, American TV had not explored this genre of storytelling; while many American detective series had depicted rudimentary physical evidence analysis such as fingerprints and bullet comparisons, Quincy, M.E. was the first American series to regularly present the in-depth forensic investigations which would be the hallmark of later detective shows such as CSI: Crime Scene Investigation, NCIS, Diagnosis: Murder, Crossing Jordan, et al. Klugman appeared twice on Diagnosis: Murder, as, respectively, Dr. Jeff Everden and Det. Harry Trumble, and once on Crossing Jordan as Dr. Leo Gelber.

== Cast ==
A total of 148 episodes of Quincy, M.E. were produced, with Jack Klugman appearing in all but one of them. In "Has Anybody Here Seen Quincy?" (season 2, episode 7), Dr. Asten talks to Quincy twice on the phone, but Quincy's voice is not heard, and he is never seen on screen. Klugman refused to appear in this episode because he disliked a scene when a body delivered to the morgue turns out to still be living. Klugman thought it ludicrous that a medical examiner of Quincy's expertise would fail to notice it.

Conversely, Klugman was the only regular cast member who appeared in the final episode of the series ("The Cutting Edge"), which was a backdoor pilot for a proposed series about a revolutionary new clinic. NBC did not pick up the new series, however.

Eddie Garrett portrayed a forensic photographer in approximately 113 episodes of the series. Joseph Roman appeared as Sgt. Brill, Lt. Monahan's partner. Marc Scott Taylor, technical advisor for the series beginning in season four, also appeared in the recurring role of Mark, a lab technician. John Nolan also played the recurring role of John the bartender in 86 episodes. Jonathan Segal played the recurring role of the laboratory technician Jeff Sellers.

Anita Gillette portrayed both of Quincy's wives. Until marrying Dr. Emily Hanover near the end of the series, Quincy had been a widower, having lost his first wife, Helen, before the events of the series. Anita Gillette was cast as the late Helen Quincy for the flashback scenes in the episode, "Promises to Keep", before being hired as Dr. Hanover.

== Home media ==
Universal Studios has released Seasons 1 and 2 of Quincy, M.E. on DVD in regions 1, 2 and 4. Season 3 was released in Region 1 on June 2, 2009, four years after the release of Seasons 1 and 2.

On September 7, 2012, it was announced that Shout! Factory had acquired the rights to the series in Region 1. It subsequently released seasons 4 – 8 on DVD.

In June 2011, Madman Entertainment announced that it had acquired the distribution rights to the series in Region 4. It subsequently released seasons 3 – 5 on DVD.

The DVDs separate the 90-minute and 60-minute episodes into first and second seasons, although they aired during the same broadcast season (1976–1977). Traditionally, the 1977–1978 season was considered the second, etc.

In 2013, Acorn Media acquired the rights to the series in Region 2. It released season 3 on March 4, 2013.

DVD Name	Ep#	Release dates		
DVD Name	Ep#	Region 1	Region 2	Region 4
Seasons 1 & 2	17	June 7, 2005	December 5, 2005	July 20, 2006
Season 1	4	February 13, 2018 (re-release)	N/A	N/A
Season 2	13	TBA	N/A	N/A
Season 3	20	June 2, 2009	March 4, 2013	July 20, 2011
Season 4	23	December 18, 2012	TBA	November 16, 2011
Season 5	22	March 19, 2013	TBA	March 21, 2012
Season 6	18	July 9, 2013	TBA	TBA
Season 7	24	November 11, 2014	TBA	TBA
Season 8	24	March 10, 2015	TBA	TBA
Seasons 6–8	66	N/A	N/A	November 2, 2022
The Complete Collection	148	N/A	N/A	November 2, 2022

== Episodes ==
Season	Episodes	Originally released	
Season	Episodes	First released	Last released
1	4	October 3, 1976	January 2, 1977
2	13	February 4, 1977	May 27, 1977
3	20	September 16, 1977	March 10, 1978
4	23	September 21, 1978	April 12, 1979
5	22	September 20, 1979	April 30, 1980
6	18	September 16, 1980	May 6, 1981
7	24	October 28, 1981	May 12, 1982
8	24	September 29, 1982	May 11, 1983

== International broadcasts ==
=== United States ===
The series is currently running in a late evening and early morning slot on Get TV and on Universal Crime streaming channel.

=== Canada ===
The series was first broadcast nationally in Canada in 1976 on CBC.

=== Australia ===
Quincy, M.E. currently airs on the Seven Network's digital-only channel 7mate daily at 11 am and 3 am.

=== United Kingdom ===
The series was first broadcast nationally in the United Kingdom in 1977 on the ITV network (albeit at differing times due to the then regional structure of the network). Repeats of the full series were initially shown on BBC1 on afternoons in the late 1980s and early 1990s, and between the late 1990s and early 2010 it frequently ran daily on ITV and (more recently) ITV3, in various time slots—usually 8 a.m., 2 p.m., and early morning. The show was shown on Universal Channel, with episodes on Sunday morning, and one episode at 8 a.m. (repeating at 4 p.m. and 5 a.m. the following morning) through the week. After a brief appearance on YourTV in the daytime, Quincy M.E. appeared last as a twice-daily run on ITV4 from May 2016 to July 2020 (afternoon and repeated the following morning). The series was normally billed in TV listings magazines as simply Quincy, as in the UK a medical examiner is called a forensic scientist; and it was felt the M.E. acronym would be unfamiliar to British viewers.

=== Japan ===
Quincy, M.E. has aired on the TV Asahi network since 1979. Tsuneyuki Serizawa, who supervised the Japanese edition, was a friend of Thomas Noguchi. Doctor Detective Quincy was the Japanese title.

=== Germany ===
Thirteen episodes were first aired from 1981 through 1983 by the public broadcaster ARD. Then, in the early 1990s, 133 episodes were aired by the commercial television station RTL. Since April 2010, kabel eins has aired the first five seasons on weekdays. In 2012 and 2013, the episodes were aired by the RTL partner station RTL Nitro. Since 2015 they have been broadcast by Sat.1 Gold, a partner station of kabel eins. All episodes shown on German TV are dubbed into German.

=== Italy ===
The series appeared in Italy in the mid-1980s on the TV channel Italia 1. The first four episodes have never been dubbed into Italian; hence they have never been aired on TV, and can be found only (with subtitles) in DVDs. Moreover, many episodes were shortened to about 50 minutes for the Italian version.
