= Cheyenne (TV series) =

American Western television series (1955–1962)

- Also known as: Warner Bros. Presents ... Cheyenne; Cheyenne: Bronco; The Cheyenne Show: Bronco; Sugarfoot
- Genre: Traditional Western (subgenre)
- Developed by: Roy Huggins
- Starring: Clint Walker
- Theme music composer: William Lava; Stan Jones
- Country of origin: United States
- Original language: English
- No. of seasons: 7
- No. of episodes: 107 (list of episodes)

Production
- Executive producer: William T. Orr
- Producers: Roy Huggins; Arthur W. Silver; Sidney Biddel; Burt Dunne; William L. Stuart; Oren W. Haglund (production manager); Harry Blackledge (wardrobe); Gordon Bau (make-up)
- Production location: California
- Running time: 41-43 min. (Season 1); 50-52 min. (Seasons 2-7)
- Production company: Warner Bros. Television

Original release
- Network: ABC
- Release: September 20, 1955 – December 17, 1962

Related
- Bronco; Maverick; Sugarfoot

L. Q. Jones (Smitty) and Clint Walker (Cheyenne)

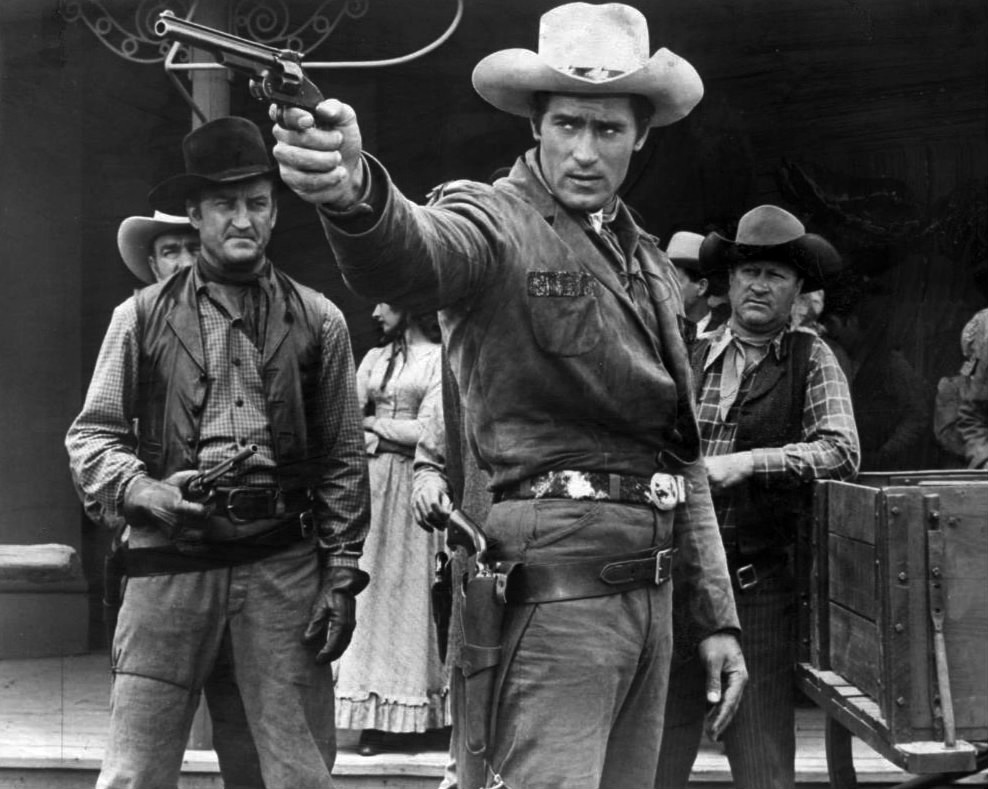
Clint Walker as Cheyenne Bodie

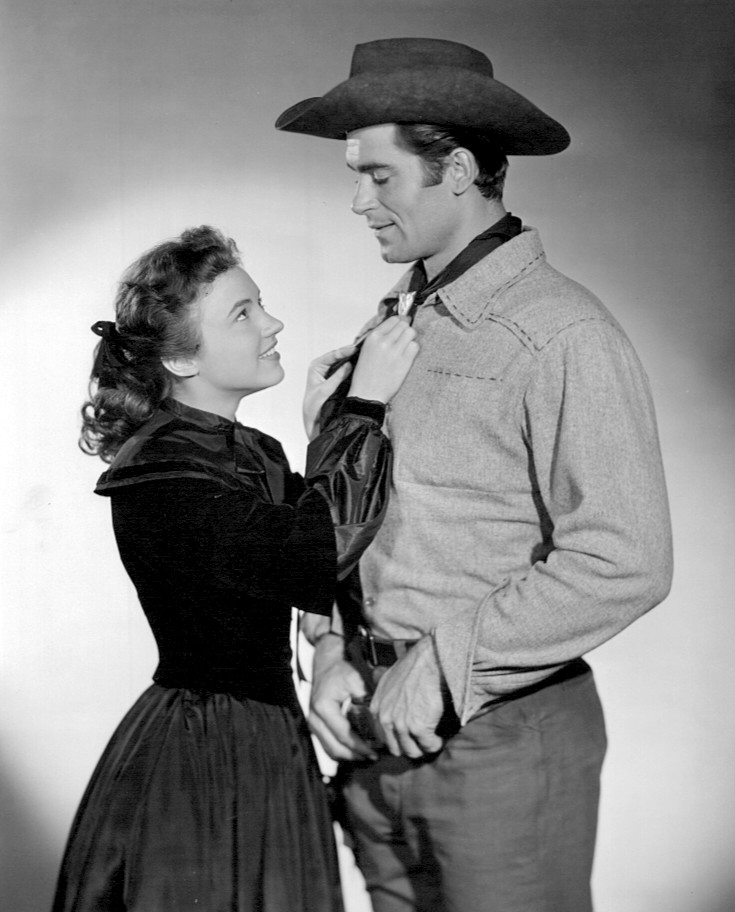
Clint Walker as Cheyenne and guest star Anne Whitfield in an episode of Cheyenne

Cheyenne is an American Western television series of 108 black-and-white episodes broadcast on ABC from 1955 to 1962. The show was the first hour-long Western, and was the first hour-long dramatic series of any kind, with continuing characters, to last more than one season. It was also the first series to be made by a major Hollywood film studio, which did not derive from its established film properties, and the first of a long chain of Warner Bros. original series produced by William T. Orr.

== Synopsis ==
The show starred Clint Walker as Cheyenne Bodie, a physically large cowboy with a gentle spirit in search of frontier justice, who wanders the American West in the days after the American Civil War. During the run of the show Cheyenne worked in various occupations including: U.S. Army scout, deputy U.S. marshal, county sheriff, prospector, cattleman, hunter, and city marshal.

The first episode, "Mountain Fortress", is about robbers pretending to be Good Samaritans. It features James Garner (who had briefly been considered for the role of Cheyenne, but could not be located until after Walker had already been cast) as a guest star, but with higher billing given to Ann Robinson as Garner's intended bride.

The episode reveals that Bodie's parents were killed by Indians, tribe unknown. He was taken by Cheyenne Indians when he was an infant, but left to be raised by a white family when he was 12. Bodie maintains a positive and understanding attitude toward the Native Americans, despite the death of his parents. Errors in continuity over the course of the series provide contradictory details of Bodie’s early life. One episode, "West of the River", states that he was taken and raised by the Cheyenne when he was 10 years old, and he left them by choice when he was 18 years old. In season five, episode one, "The Long Rope" (aired September 26, 1960), Cheyenne returns to the town where he was raised by the Pierce family, whose head, Jeff, was lynched when Cheyenne was a youth.

== Cast ==
- Clint Walker as Cheyenne Bodie (107 episodes)
- L. Q. Jones appeared as "Smitty" Smith in episodes 1, 2, and 4

No other characters were regular or recurring, although several actors were frequently used in guest or bit roles. Clyde Howdy appeared as a variety of characters in 49 episodes, Chuck Hicks can be seen playing assorted characters in 15 episodes, and Lane Chandler appears as different characters in 10 episodes.

== Background and production ==
The series began as a part of Warner Bros. Presents, a "wheel program" rotating three different series. In its first year, Cheyenne traded broadcast weeks with Casablanca and Kings Row. Thereafter, Cheyenne was overhauled by new producer Roy Huggins and left the umbrella of that wheel.

Cheyenne ran from 1955 to 1962, except for a hiatus when Walker went on strike for better terms (1958–1959); among other demands, the actor wanted increased residuals, a reduction of the 50% cut of personal appearance payments that had to be turned over to Warner Bros., and a release from the restriction of recording music only for the company's own label.

The interim had the introduction of a virtual Bodie-clone called Bronco Layne, played by Ty Hardin, born in New York City, but raised in Texas. Hardin was featured as the quasi-main character during Bodie's absence. When Warner Bros. renegotiated Walker's contract and the actor returned to the show in 1959, Bronco was spun off.

Even after returning to the program – having been prohibited from seeking other work during the long contract negotiation – Walker was unhappy to continue to play a role which he felt he had already exhausted. He told reporters that he felt like "a caged animal."

== Episodes ==
Season	Episodes	Originally released		Rank	Average viewership (in millions)
Season	Episodes	First released	Last released	Rank	Average viewership (in millions)
1	15	September 20, 1955	May 29, 1956	Not in top 30	N/A
2	20	September 11, 1956	June 4, 1957	Not in top 30	N/A
3	20	September 24, 1957	June 17, 1958	13	12.7
4	13	September 21, 1959	March 14, 1960	18	12.3
5	13	October 3, 1960	May 15, 1961	17	11.8
6	13	September 25, 1961	March 12, 1962	28	10.4
7	13	September 24, 1962	December 17, 1962	Not in top 30	N/A

== Release ==
=== Broadcast ===
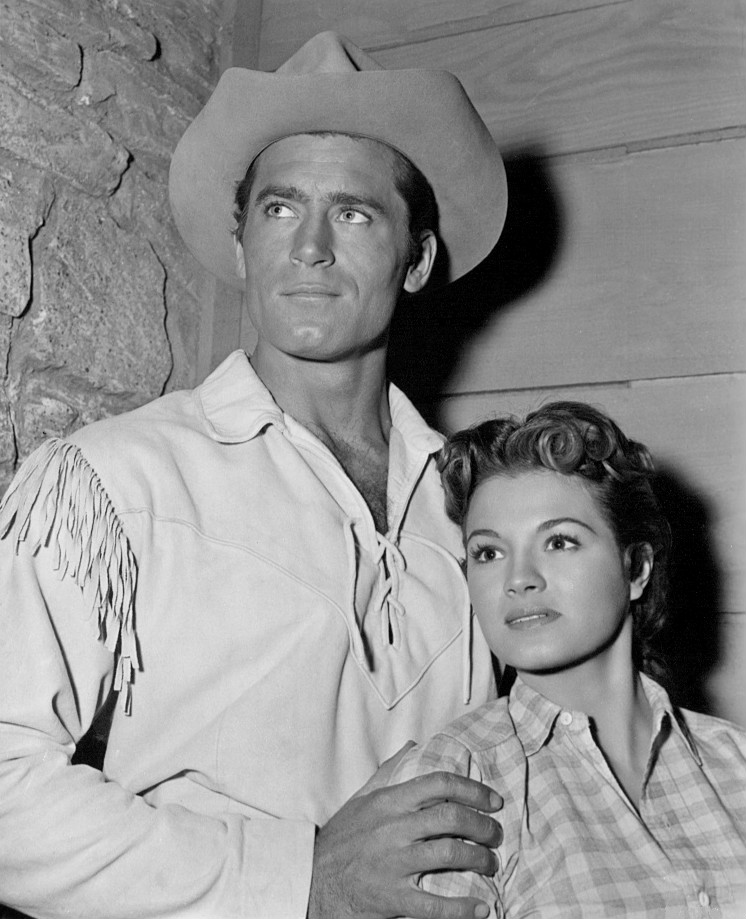
Clint Walker and Angie Dickinson

Cheyenne aired on ABC from 1955 to 1962: September 1955–September 1959 on Tuesday at 7:30–8:30 pm; September 1959–December 1962, Monday 7:30–8:30 pm.The series finished at number 13 in the Nielsen ratings for the 1957–1958 season, number 18 for 1958–1959, number 17 for 1959–1960, and number 28 for 1960–1961.

=== Home media ===
Warner Home Video released a "Best of..." single disc featuring three individual episodes (from three separate seasons) on September 27, 2005, as part of their "Television Favorites" compilation series. The featured episodes were "The Storm Riders" (from season one), "The Trap" (from season two), and "The Young Fugitives" (from season six).

Warner Home Video has released the first season on DVD in Region 1. Seasons 2–7 have been released via their Warner Archive Collection. These are manufacture-on-demand releases on DVD-R discs. The seventh and final season was released on November 12, 2013.

DVD name	Ep #	Release date
The Complete First Season	15	June 6, 2006
The Complete Second Season	20	July 5, 2011
The Complete Third Season	20	January 10, 2012
The Complete Fourth Season	13	October 16, 2012
The Complete Fifth Season	13	March 5, 2013
The Complete Sixth Season	14	July 30, 2013
The Complete Seventh Season	13	November 12, 2013

== Reception ==
- Cheyenne was a co-winner of the 1957 Golden Globe Award for Television Achievement.
- 1957: Emmy nomination for Robert Watts (Best Editing of a Film for Television)

== Spin-offs and crossovers ==
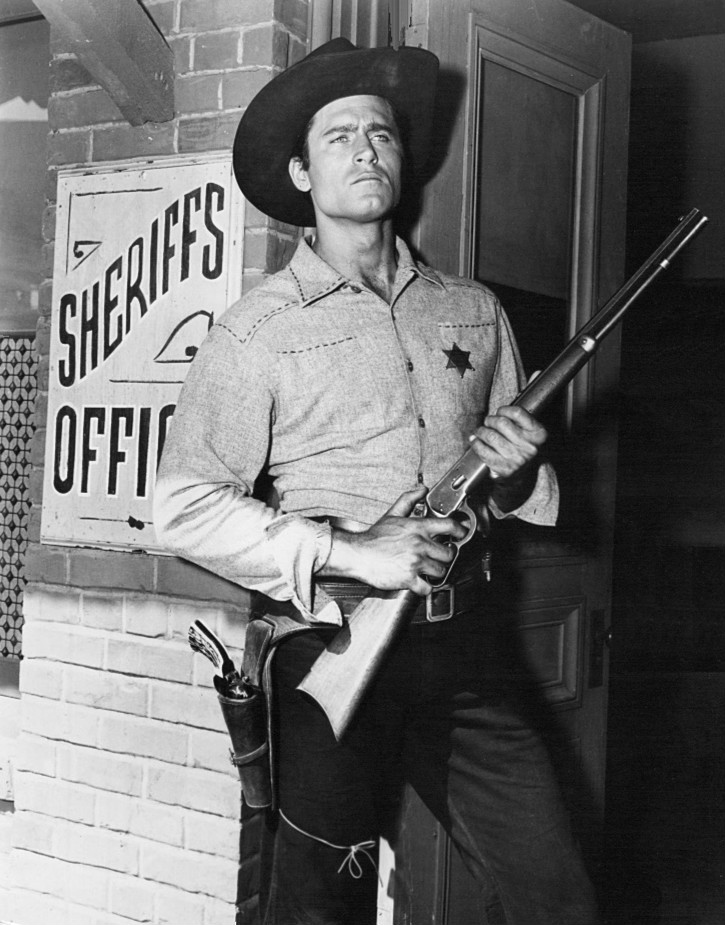
Clint Walker as Cheyenne, 1957

At the conclusion of the sixth season, a special episode "A Man Named Ragan" was aired, the pilot for a program called The Dakotas, starring Larry Ward, Chad Everett, Jack Elam, and Michael Greene, which was to have replaced Cheyenne in the middle of the next season. However, because Cheyenne Bodie never appeared in the "Ragan" episode, the two programs are only tenuously linked.

Walker reprised the Cheyenne Bodie character in 1991 for the TV movie The Gambler Returns: The Luck of the Draw, which featured numerous actors from earlier television series playing their original roles (Jack Kelly, Brian Keith, Gene Barry, Hugh O'Brian, Chuck Connors, David Carradine, et al.); and also portrayed Cheyenne in a time-travel episode of Kung Fu: The Legend Continues called "Gunfighters" in 1995.
