= List of Cheyenne episodes =

Cheyenne is an American Western television series which ran on ABC from 1955 to 1963. The show broadcast 107 black-and-white episodes. The show was the first hour-long Western, and was the first hour-long dramatic series of any kind, with continuing characters, to last more than one season. It was also the first series to be made by a major Hollywood film studio which did not derive from its established film properties, and the first of a long chain of Warner Bros. original series produced by William T. Orr.

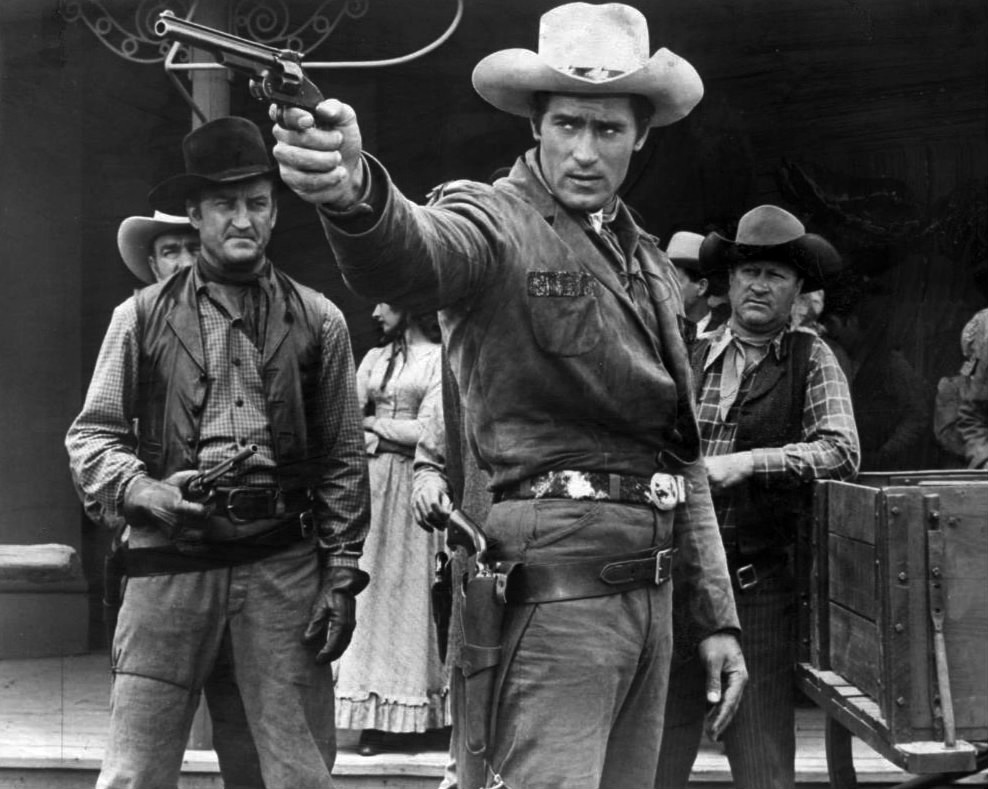
Scene from the program, 1956

== Series overview ==
Season	Episodes	Originally released		Rank	Average viewership (in millions)
Season	Episodes	First released	Last released	Rank	Average viewership (in millions)
1	15	September 20, 1955	May 29, 1956	Not in top 30	N/A
2	20	September 11, 1956	June 4, 1957	Not in top 30	N/A
3	20	September 24, 1957	June 17, 1958	13	12.7
4	13	September 21, 1959	March 14, 1960	18	12.3
5	13	October 3, 1960	May 15, 1961	17	11.8
6	13	September 25, 1961	March 12, 1962	28	10.4
7	13	September 24, 1962	December 17, 1962	Not in top 30	N/A

== Episodes ==
=== Season 1 (1955–56) ===
No. overall	No. in season	Title	Original release date
1	1	"Mountain Fortress"	September 20, 1955
Guest stars: James Garner as Lt. Forsythe
2	2	"Julesburg"	October 11, 1955
Guest stars: Ray Teal as a cattle baron, Billy Chapin as Tommy Scott
3	3	"The Argonauts"	November 1, 1955
Guest stars: Rod Taylor as Clancy, Edward Andrews as Duncan
4	4	"Border Showdown"	November 22, 1955
Guest stars: Adele Mara
5	5	"The Outlander"	December 13, 1955
Guest stars: Doris Dowling
6	6	"The Travelers"	January 3, 1956
Guest stars: James Gleason, Robert Armstrong
7	7	"The Black Hawk War"	January 24, 1956
Guest stars: James Garner as Lt. Rogers, Michael Landon as a trooper
8	8	"The Storm Riders"	February 7, 1956
Guest stars: Beverly Michaels, Regis Toomey
9	9	"Rendezvous at Red Rock"	February 21, 1956
Guest stars: Gerald Mohr as Pat Keogh
10	10	"West of the River"	March 10, 1956
Guest stars: Lois Collier, Trevor Bardette
11	11	"Quicksand"	April 1, 1956
Guest stars: Dean Fredericks as Yellowknife, Dennis Hopper as The Utah Kid
12	12	"Fury at Rio Hondo"	April 17, 1956
Guest stars: Peggie Castle as Mary "Mississippi" Brown
13	13	"Star in the Dust"	May 1, 1956
Guest stars: Chris Alcaide as Deputy Hack
14	14	"Johnny Bravo"	May 15, 1956
Guest stars: Penny Edwards
15	15	"The Last Train West"	May 29, 1956
Guest stars: James Garner as Rev. Brett Mailer

=== Season 2 (1956–57) ===
In "The Dark Rider," the first episode of season 2, Diane Brewster appears as Samantha Crawford, a character later featured in four episodes of Maverick starring James Garner and Jack Kelly between 1957 and 1959, another Warner Bros.Western series. "Samantha Crawford" was the maiden name of writer/producer Roy Huggins' mother. Huggins produced Cheyenne beginning with season 2 and Maverick for its first two (and most successful) seasons. "The Dark Rider" was filmed again as a Maverick episode starring Jack Kelly titled "Yellow River," but with a different cast (Warner Bros. frequently recycled scripts through their various series during this era, changing only the names and locales). At one point, Kelly's character (Bart Maverick) notes to the new leading lady that she reminds him of Samantha Crawford.

No. overall	No. in season	Title	Original release date
16	1	"The Dark Rider"	September 11, 1956
Guest stars: Diane Brewster as Samantha Crawford
17	2	"The Long Winter"	September 25, 1956
Guest stars: Hayden Rorke as Major George Early
18	3	"Death Deals the Hand"	October 9, 1956
Guest stars: Terry Wilson as a robber
19	4	"The Bounty Killers"	October 23, 1956
Guest stars: Walter Coy as Sheriff Townley
20	5	"The Law Man"	November 6, 1956
Guest stars: Andrea King, Grant Withers
21	6	"Mustang Trail"	November 20, 1956
Guest stars: Diane Brewster
22	7	"Lone Gun"	December 4, 1956
Guest stars: Trevor Bardette as Amarillo Ames
23	8	"The Trap"	December 18, 1956
Guest stars: Margaret Hayes
24	9	"The Iron Trail"	January 1, 1957
Guest stars: Dennis Hopper as Abe Larson
25	10	"Land Beyond the Law"	January 15, 1957
Guest stars: Francis DeSales as Lieutenant Quentin, Dan Blocker as Pete, Andrew Duggan as Major Ellwood, James Griffith appeared as Joe Epic, Jennifer Howard as Ellen Ellwood, Forrest Lewis as Charlie Miller, Rory Mallinson appeared as Tom Andrews, Phil Tead appeared as Yound
26	11	"Test of Courage"	January 29, 1957
Guest stars: Mary Castle as Alice Wilson
27	12	"War Party"	February 12, 1957
Guest stars: Angie Dickinson as Jeannie Trude, James Garner as Peake
28	13	"Deadline"	February 26, 1957
Guest stars: John Qualen
29	14	"Big Ghost Basin"	March 12, 1957
Guest stars: Slim Pickens as Gary Owen
30	15	"Born Bad"	March 26, 1957
Guest stars: Robert F. Simon as Chad Wilcox
31	16	"The Brand"	April 9, 1957
Guest stars: Edd Byrnes as Clay Rafferty, Kelo Henderson as Doc Pardes , Francis DeSales as The Sheriff
32	17	"Decision at Gunsight"	April 23, 1957
Guest stars: John Carradine as Delos Gerrard
33	18	"The Spanish Grant"	May 7, 1957
Guest stars: Hal Baylor as Jed Rayner, Peggie Castle as Amy Gordon, Frank Ferguson as Sheriff Allen, Anthony George as Sancho Mendariz, Douglas Kennedy as Blake Holloway
34	19	"Hard Bargain"	May 21, 1957
Guest stars: Richard Crenna as Curley Galway
35	20	"The Broken Pledge"	June 4, 1957
Guest stars: Jean Byron as Fay Kirby, Frank de Kova as Chief Sitting Bull, Dean Fredericks as Little Chief

=== Season 3 (1957–58) ===
No. overall	No. in season	Title	Original release date
36	1	"Incident at Indian Springs"	September 24, 1957
Guest stars: Dan Barton as Jim Ellis, Christopher Olsen as Kenny
37	2	"The Conspirators"	October 8, 1957
Guest stars: Joan Weldon, Tom Conway, Guinn "Big Boy" Williams
38	3	"The Mutton Puncher"	October 22, 1957
Guest stars: Gilman Rankin as Ringo
39	4	"Border Affair"	November 5, 1957
Guest stars: Erin O'Brien, Sebastian Cabot
40	5	"Devil's Canyon"	November 19, 1957
Guest stars: Ainslie Pryor played King Forest
41	6	"Town of Fear"	December 3, 1957
Guest stars: Ron Hayes as The Durango Kid, Walter Coy as Sheriff Townley
42	7	"Hired Gun"	December 17, 1957
Guest stars: Alan Hale Jr. as Les Bridgeman, Don Megowan as Kiley Rand
43	8	"Top Hand"	December 31, 1957
Guest stars: Peter Brown as Clay Conover, Walt Barnes as Chris Barlow, Jeanne Cooper appeared as Marie Conover, Terry Frost as Dan Naylor, Ed Prentiss as Ben Gentry
44	9	"The Last Comanchero"	January 14, 1958
Guest stars: Edd Byrnes as Benji Danton, Harold J. Stone as Rafe Larkin
45	10	"The Gambler"	January 28, 1958
Guest stars: Evelyn Ankers as Robbie James, James Seay appeared as Duke Tavener
46	11	"Renegades"	February 11, 1958
Guest stars: Peter Brown as Jed Wayne, Steve Darrell as Chief Little Elk
47	12	"The Empty Gun"	February 25, 1958
Guest stars: John Russell as Matt Reardon, Tod Griffin as Sheriff Frank Day, Sean Garrison as Mike
48	13	"White Warrior"	March 11, 1958
Guest stars: Michael Landon as White Hawk / Alan Horn, Peter Whitney as Eli Henderson
49	14	"Ghost of the Cimarron"	March 25, 1958
Guest stars: Russ Conway as Marshal Stort, Vaughn Taylor as Doc Johnson, Wright King as the Kiowa Kid, Peter Brown as Billy Younger
50	15	"Wagon-Tongue North"	April 8, 1958
Guest stars: Ann McCrea as Faith Swain
51	16	"The Long Search"	April 22, 1958
Guest stars: Claude Akins as Sheriff Bob Walters, Gail Kobe as Della Carver, Randy Stuart as Margaret "Peg" Ellis
52	17	"Standoff"	May 6, 1958
Guest stars: Joy Page, Rodolfo Acosta
53	18	"Dead to Rights"	May 20, 1958
Guest stars: Joanna Barnes as Adelaide Marshall, Don "Red" Barry appeared as Shorty Jones, Mike Conners as Roy Simmons, Saundra Edwards as Vardis Coll , Don Megowan as Gregg Dewey, John Russell as Saylor Hornbrook, Karl Swenson as Bruce Coll
54	19	"Noose at Noon"	June 3, 1958
Guest stars: Dan Blocker as Deputy Sam
55	20	"The Angry Sky"	June 17, 1958
Guest stars: Andrew Duggan as Black Jack

=== Season 4 (1959–60) ===
No. overall	No. in season	Title	Original release date
56	1	"Blind Spot"	September 21, 1959
Guest stars: Robert L. Crawford Jr., Jean Byron, Adam West, John Litel
57	2	"The Reprieve"	October 5, 1959
Guest stars: Tim Considine as Billy McQueen, Connie Stevens as Clovis
58	3	"The Rebellion"	October 12, 1959
Guest stars: Rodolfo Acosta, Faith Domergue
59	4	"Trial by Conscience"	October 26, 1959
Guest stars: Jeff York, Pat Crowley
60	5	"The Imposter"	November 2, 1959
Guest stars: James Drury as Bill Magruder
61	6	"Prisoner of Moon Mesa"	November 16, 1959
Guest stars: Robert F. Simon as Hub Lassiter
62	7	"Gold, Glory and Custer - Prelude"	January 4, 1960
Guest stars: Lorne Greene as Colonel Bell, Tyler McVey as Henry Toland, Barry Atwater as George Armstrong Custer
63	8	"Gold, Glory and Custer - Requiem"	January 11, 1960
Guest stars: Lorne Greene as Colonel Bell, Tyler McVey as Henry Toland, Barry Atwater as George Armstrong Custer
64	9	"Riot at Arroyo Seco"	February 1, 1960
Guest stars: Whitney Blake as Beth Tobin
65	10	"Apache Blood"	February 8, 1960
Walter Coy as Sheriff Townley, Scott Marlowe as Mickey Free
66	11	"Outcast of Cripple Creek"	February 29, 1960
Guest stars: Rhodes Reason, Lisa Gaye
67	12	"Alibi for the Scalped Man"	March 7, 1960
Guest stars: Mala Powers, R.G. Armstrong
68	13	"Home Is the Brave"	March 14, 1960
Guest stars: Brad Johnson as Sheriff Dan Blaisdell

=== Season 5 (1960–61) ===
No. overall	No. in season	Title	Original release date
69	1	"The Long Rope"	October 3, 1960
Guest stars: Donald May as Fred Baker/Randy Pierce, Merry Anders as Ruth Graham/Fay Pierce
70	2	"Counterfeit Gun"	October 10, 1960
Guest stars: Ron Howard as Timmy
71	3	"Road to Three Graves"	October 31, 1960
Guest stars: Alan Hale Jr., Jean Byron
72	4	"Two Trails to Santa Fe"	November 28, 1960
Guest stars: Tony Young as Yellowknife, Robert Colbert as Army Corporal Howie Burch
73	5	"Savage Breed"	December 19, 1960
Guest stars: Walter Coy as Sheriff Townley
74	6	"Incident at Dawson Flats"	January 9, 1961
Guest stars: Gerald Mohr as Elmer Bostrum, Jock Gaynor as Johnny McIntire, , Joan O'Brien as Selma Dawson
75	7	"Duel at Judas Basin"	January 30, 1961
Guest stars: Max Baer Jr., Jacques Aubuchon
76	8	"The Return of Mr. Grimm"	February 13, 1961
Guest stars: R. G. Armstrong as Nathanael Grimm
77	9	"The Beholden"	February 27, 1961
Guest stars: Patrice Wymore, Max Baer Jr.
78	10	"The Frightened Town"	March 20, 1961
Guest stars: Gregg Palmer as Dillard
79	11	"Lone Patrol"	April 10, 1961
Guest stars: Dawn Wells as Sarah Claypool
80	12	"Massacre at Gunsight Pass"	May 1, 1961
Guest stars: Robert Knapp as Frank Thorne
81	13	"The Greater Glory"	May 15, 1961
Guest stars: Tod Griffin as Rafe Donovan

=== Season 6 (1961–62) ===
No. overall	No. in season	Title	Original release date
82	1	"Winchester Quarantine"	September 25, 1961
Guest stars: Susan Cummings as Helen Ransom
83	2	"Trouble Street"	October 2, 1961
Guest stars: Ahna Capri as Mary Randall, Gilman Rankin as Price
84	3	"Cross Purpose"	October 9, 1961
Guest stars: Joyce Meadows as Madaline De Vier
85	4	"The Young Fugitives"	October 23, 1961
Guest stars: Dayton Lummis as Frank Collins , Richard Evans as Gilby Collins, Anne Whitfield Nita
86	5	"Day's Pay"	October 31, 1961
Guest stars: Ellen Burstyn as Emmy Mae
87	6	"Retaliation"	November 13, 1961
Guest stars: Randy Stuart
88	7	"Storm Center"	November 20, 1961
Guest stars: Dorothy Green
89	8	"Legacy of the Lost"	December 4, 1961
Guest stars: Peter Breck as James Abbot in
90	9	"The Brahma Bull"	December 11, 1961
Guest stars: Suzi Carnell
91	10	"The Wedding Rings"	January 8, 1962
Guest stars: Margarita Cordova
92	11	"The Idol"	January 29, 1962
Guest stars: Roger Mobley as Gabe Morse
93	12	"One Way Ticket"	February 12, 1962
Guest stars: Philip Carey as Cole Younger, Ronnie Dapo as Roy Barrington, Philip Carey as Cole Younger
94	13	"The Bad Penny"	March 12, 1962

=== Season 7 (1962) ===
No. overall	No. in season	Title	Original release date
95	1	"The Durango Brothers"	September 24, 1962
Guest stars: Sally Kellerman as Lottie Durango
96	2	"Satonka"	October 1, 1962
Guest stars: Susan Seaforth Hayes, James Best
97	3	"Sweet Sam"	October 8, 1962
Guest stars: Roger Mobley as Billy
98	4	"Man Alone"	October 15, 1962
Guest stars: Robert Karnes as Matt Walsh
99	5	"The Quick and the Deadly"	October 22, 1962
Guest stars: Chris Alcaide as Deputy Hack, I. Stanford Jolley as Ezra
100	6	"Indian Gold"	October 29, 1962
Guest stars: Peter Breck as Sheriff Matt Kilgore
101	7	"Dark Decision"	November 5, 1962
Guest stars: John M. Pickard as Ben Cask, Michael Landon as a trooper, Peter Breck as Tony Chance
102	8	"Pocketful of Stars"	November 12, 1962
Guest stars: Lisa Lu, Robert Anderson, Peter Brown
103	9	"The Vanishing Breed"	November 19, 1962
Guest stars: Harry Lauter as Walt Taylor
104	10	"Vengeance Is Mine"	November 26, 1962
Guest stars: Jean Willes, Denver Pyle
105	11	"Johnny Brassbuttons"	December 3, 1962
Guest stars: Tony Young as Johnny Brassbuttons
106	12	"Wanted for the Murder of Cheyenne Bodie"	December 10, 1962
Guest stars: Ruta Lee as Lenore Hanford, Robert Knapp as Deputy Rankin
107	13	"Showdown at Oxbend"	December 17, 1962
Guest stars: James Stacy as Luther James, Joan Caulfield as Darcy Clay, Andrew Duggan Ed Foster
