= The White Buffalo (film) =

1977 film by J. Lee Thompson

- Theatrical release poster
- Directed by: J. Lee Thompson
- Written by: Richard Sale
- Based on: novel by Richard Sale
- Produced by: Pancho Kohner
- Starring: Charles Bronson; Jack Warden; Will Sampson; Clint Walker; Slim Pickens; Stuart Whitman; Kim Novak
- Cinematography: Paul Lohmann
- Edited by: Michael F. Anderson
- Music by: John Barry
- Distributed by: United Artists
- Release date: May 6, 1977
- Running time: 97 minutes
- Country: United States
- Language: English
- Budget: $6 million

The White Buffalo is a 1977 American Western film directed by J. Lee Thompson and starring Charles Bronson, Kim Novak, Jack Warden, Slim Pickens and Will Sampson.

== Plot ==
Wild Bill Hickok is haunted by his dreams of a giant white buffalo, so much that he travels the West to find the beast. Along the way, he meets the Lakota warrior Crazy Horse, who is also searching the plains for the giant white buffalo, which has killed his daughter. Hickok and Crazy Horse team up to kill the elusive buffalo.

== Cast ==
- Charles Bronson as Wild Bill Hickok
- Will Sampson as Crazy Horse
- Jack Warden as Charlie Zane
- Slim Pickens as Abel Pickney
- Kim Novak as Poker Jenny Schermerhorn
- Clint Walker as Whistling Jack Kileen
- Stuart Whitman as Winifred Coxy
- John Carradine as Amos Briggs
- Cara Williams as Cassie Ollinger
- Douglas Fowley as Amos Bixby
- Clifford A. Pellow as Pete Holt
- Ed Lauter as Captain Tom Custer
- Martin Kove as Jack McCall
- Ed Bakey as Ben Corbett
- Scott Walker as Gyp Hook-Hand
- Cliff Carnell as Johnny Varner
- Ron Thompson as Frozen Dog Pimp

== Production ==
The film was based on a novel by Richard Sale published in 1975. Reviewing the novel, Larry McMurtry said Sale "chose a topic with great possibilities, turned it into a sharpened stake and proceeded to impale himself on it."

Film rights were bought by Dino De Laurentiis, who signed Sale to adapt the novel. Sale said De Laurentiis was, along with Daryl Zanuck, one of the finest producers he ever worked with.

Bronson signed to make the film in July 1975.

"It's a Moby Dick of the west," said director J. Lee Thompson. "It's a film we hope will work on many levels. On the first it is a wonderful, sensitive story between Wild Bill Hickok and the great Indian chief Crazy Horse. On the second it talks of a man having to find himself, seek his destiny, rid himself of fears and become more human."

Much of the film was shot on a soundstage in Los Angeles, with location shots in Colorado and New Mexico. For the buffalo scenes, producer Laurentiis hired Carlo Rambaldi to design an animatronic full-size bison that would slide around on tracks. This was based on his larger-scale work on their previous collaboration King Kong (1976).

Actors Ed Lauter and David Roya were similarly involved in King Kong, along with composer John Barry.

== Reception ==
=== Critical response ===
The film had only a sporadic release in various "test engagements" and was not screened for critics.

On Metacritic the film has a weighted average score of 25 out of 100, based on 4 critics, indicating "generally unfavorable reviews".

Gene Siskel of the Chicago Tribune gave the film 2 stars out of 4 and called it "a hunting story to be read in the broadest terms. Hickok, who hates Indians, and Crazy Horse, who hates white men, grow to respect each other through the film. Courage kills racism. It's a shame this theme isn't developed more. The script, based on a Richard Sale novel, instead takes side trips into a standard barroom shootout and a Charles Bronson reunion with an old lady friend (Kim Novak)."

Arthur D. Murphy of Variety wrote, "Withheld for months from reviewers, 'The White Buffalo' is a turkey ... The trade has to wonder how a project like this gets off the ground, when the dialog is enough to invite jeers from an audience. The title beast looks like a hung-over carnival prize despite attempts at camouflage via hokey sound track noise, busy John Barry scoring, murky photography and fast editing." Gary Arnold of The Washington Post stated that the film "is destined for almost instant obscurity in domestic release, a consummation that can't come a minute too soon for director J. Lee Thompson, star Charles Bronson and everyone else in an exposed position on this fiasco." He thought the buffalo looked very fake and "[t]he producer under a white sheet chanting 'boogie-boogie-boogie' would have been more effective."

Jonathan Rosenbaum of The Monthly Film Bulletin wrote, "One would have to consult Richard Sale's novel to determine whether the freakish gaps, detours and red herrings are ascribable (in whole or in part) to the original source. As the movie version stands, the bewildering lack of motivation for Hickok's recurring white buffalo nightmare—from which he invariably wakes blasting away with pistols in each hand—suggests, along with a lot of other inponderables, that a great deal of background exposition has either been eliminated or drastically reduced, leaving a peculiarly disassembled narrative in its wake ... Equally bizarre and inexact is the title beast itself—a clumsy mechanical contrivance resembling a giant shaggy toy whose roars bear an uncomfortable similarity to the sounds of a growling stomach."

The New York Times wrote, "'One Flew Over the Cuckoo's Nest' could be interpreted as a proto‐western —a red man and a white man form an alliance against an institutionalized world. Indeed, Charles Bronson's 'The White Buffalo' will deal with just such an alliance."

The White Buffalo holds a 17% rating on Rotten Tomatoes based on five reviews.

== Notes ==
The film screened on television under the title Hunt to Kill.
