= 10 to Midnight =

1983 film

- Theatrical release poster
- Directed by: J. Lee Thompson
- Written by: William Roberts; J. Lee Thompson
- Produced by: Pancho Kohner; Lance Hool
- Starring: Charles Bronson; Lisa Eilbacher; Andrew Stevens; Gene Davis; Geoffrey Lewis; Wilford Brimley
- Cinematography: Adam Greenberg
- Edited by: Peter Lee Thompson
- Music by: Robert O. Ragland
- Production companies: Cannon Group; City Films
- Distributed by: Cannon Films
- Release date: March 11, 1983 (United States)
- Running time: 102 minutes
- Country: United States
- Language: English
- Budget: $4 million
- Box office: $7 million

10 to Midnight is a 1983 American neo-noir thriller film directed by J. Lee Thompson from a screenplay originally written by William Roberts. The film stars Charles Bronson in the lead role with a supporting cast that includes Lisa Eilbacher, Andrew Stevens, Gene Davis, Geoffrey Lewis, and Wilford Brimley. 10 to Midnight was released by City Films, a subsidiary of Cannon Films, to American cinemas on March 11, 1983.

== Plot ==
Warren Stacey is a young office equipment repairman who kills women after they reject his sexual advances. His attempts at flirting are always seen as creepy by women, resulting in frequent rejections. One night, Stacey attends a showing of Butch Cassidy and the Sundance Kid at a theatre and deliberately accosts the women sitting next to him so that they will remember him. As the movie plays, he heads for the theatre's bathroom and slips out through a window. He tracks Betty, a co-worker who had rejected his advances, down to a wooded area, and observes her having sex with her boyfriend in the back of a van. He strips naked, puts on gloves and ambushes the couple, kills the boyfriend and chases her into the forest, eventually catching up to her and stabbing her to death. Afterwards, he returns to the theatre and exits with the other attendees, giving him a solid alibi.

Detective Leo Kessler and his partner Paul McAnn are investigating the murders. Kessler is a seasoned veteran of the force, while McAnn is considerably younger. Meanwhile, Laurie Kessler, a nursing student, is struggling to reconcile her relationship with Leo, her father.

Stacey attends Betty's funeral and hears her father mention to Kessler, a family friend, that Betty kept a diary about her encounters with other men. Fearing he might be mentioned in the diary, Stacey searches Betty's bedroom in her apartment, but is interrupted when Karen Smalley, Betty's roommate and co-worker, returns from the funeral. Stacey stabs her to death in the kitchen and resumes searching for the diary, only to find it missing; Kessler had already acquired it from Karen during his questioning.

Eventually, Stacey is formally arrested and charged. Kessler decides to plant evidence in order to frame Stacey and put him away for good; when McAnn discovers this, he confronts Kessler and refuses to go along out of fear of committing perjury, as he had been called to the witness stand in the case. Kessler ultimately confesses to planting the evidence in court, resulting in the case against Stacey being dismissed and Kessler being fired from the force.

Now a free man, Stacey taunts Kessler over the phone, but Kessler returns the favor by ransacking Stacey's apartment, taunting him over the phone in turn, and getting him fired from his office job. That evening, Kessler tails Stacey through the streets of Los Angeles, and observes him picking up a prostitute and taking her to a seedy hotel. However, when he arrives at the hotel, he finds the prostitute unconscious and Stacey gone. Realizing that he is going after Laurie, he frantically calls her dorm at the nursing college where she stays to warn her and her roommates, but he is too late; Stacey breaks into the dorm and brutally murders Laurie's three roommates while Laurie hides from him.

As Leo alerts McAnn to Stacey's whereabouts and they both head for the dorm, Laurie manages to escape after wounding Stacey with a hot curling iron. He chases her through the street fully nude, but McAnn and Leo manage to catch up to him, saving Laurie. Stacey begins ranting about how he is insane and thus liable to be released after doing jail time. As the police arrive and handcuff him, Stacey warns Leo that "the whole fucking world" will hear from him again, to which Leo coldly responds, "No, we won't," and shoots him through the head, killing him.

== Cast ==
- Charles Bronson as Detective Leo Kessler
- Lisa Eilbacher as Laurie Kessler
- Andrew Stevens as Paul McAnn
- Gene Davis as Warren Stacey
- Geoffrey Lewis as Dave Dante
- Wilford Brimley as Capt. Clem Malone
- Robert Lyons as Nathan Zager
- Bert Williams as Mr. F. L. Johnson
- Iva Lane as Bunny
- Ola Ray as Ola
- Kelly Palzis as Doreen
- Cosie Costa as Dudley
- Paul McCallum as Lab Technician
- Jeana Tomasina as Karen Smalley
- June Gilbert as Betty Johnson
- Arthur Hansel as Judge
- Sam Chew as Minister
- Sydna Scott as Mrs. Johnson
- Barbara Pilavin as Mrs. Byrd
- Carmen Filpi as Hotel Clerk
- Deran Sarafian as Dale Anders
- Jeane Manson as Margo
- Shay Duffin as Nestor
- Larry Caruso as Fingerprint Detective (uncredited)
- Anne Lockhart as Murder Victim (uncredited)
- Shawn Schepps as Peg

== Production ==
Producer Pancho Kohner had made a number of films with Charles Bronson and J. Lee Thompson. They purchased the film rights to the 1978 novel The Evil That Men Do, by R. Lance Hill. Cannon Films chairman Menahem Golan wanted to market Bronson's next film project and the adaptation of the novel was going to be that project. But Kohner estimated the rights to the novel and the cost of the screenplay to be worth $200,000. Menahem refused to pay and the deal fell through.

However, Menahem still offered to market Bronson's next film project, just not based on that novel. He and Kohner had already arranged a visit to the Cannes Film Festival to promote The Evil That Men Do. He asked Kohner to come up with a new project and fresh title, and 10 to Midnight was the result of his brainstorm. At the Festival they promoted the project to potential buyers, as a film featuring action, danger, and revenge. But at this point, they really had no script for the suggested film. Back in Los Angeles, they went in search of a story. A colleague of Kohner's, Lance Hool, suggested using the screenplay Bloody Sunday by William Roberts. They simply attached the already chosen title to that screenplay. (The Evil That Men Do later ended up being financed by ITC Entertainment.)

The name of killer Warren for Warren Stacy was based on Hollywood star Warren Beatty.

Actor Gene Davis, who played Warren, said that director J. Lee Thompson pretty much left him alone to form his character, but told him "We don't want the role to be sympathetic..." presumably so as to make the ending have more impact.

Two scenes in the original script were eventually not shot, one with Warren interacting with a 10-year old girl at the park, and another with Warren being hit on by a gay man. The original ending had Leo wrestle Warren down to the ground during their final confrontation, but Bronson refused to get up close and personal with a naked Davis.

The music for 10 to Midnight was composed by Cannon Films mainstay Robert O. Ragland and the film was recorded by cinematographer Adam Greenberg. The film also features actor Robert F. Lyons and actress Kelly Preston (listed as Kelly Palzis) in smaller roles.

== Reception ==
=== Critical response ===
Heavy on violence, nudity, vulgar language and sexual situations, 10 to Midnight drew mixed to scathing reviews from film critics. There was a rare “zero stars" rating from Roger Ebert of the Chicago Sun-Times who said the film’s story was almost incomprehensible, and also wrote: "I admired [Bronson's] strong, simple talent once. What is he doing in a garbage disposal like this?"

The film did receive positive feedback from others, such as Ebert's colleague Gene Siskel of the Chicago Tribune, and was a moderate financial success.

The film has maintained a sizeable cult following through home video releases and cable TV showings. The film was often heavily edited for television broadcasts which displayed alternate scenes of Stacy and his victims in their underwear instead of being totally naked.

On Rotten Tomatoes, the film holds an approval rating of 40% based on 10 reviews, with an average rating of 5.33/10. On Metacritic the film has a weighted average score of 12 out of 100, based on 6 critics, indicating "Overwhelming Dislike".
