= Ray Milland filmography =

This is a filmography of the Welsh actor Ray Milland, containing his work in theatrically released motion pictures as well as his extensive television credits. Milland began his film career in United Kingdom in 1929 after serving three years as a guardsman in the Royal Household Cavalry, based in London. After appearing in several British films, he went to the United States in 1930 where he spent several years playing small and supporting roles. Eventually, in 1934, he became a contract player at Paramount Pictures where he established himself as a popular star. Milland remained with Paramount for the next 21 years. During his time with the studio, he developed his persona as a debonair leading man, mainly in drawing-room comedies but also occasionally in adventure and mystery films. In 1945, Milland won the Academy Award for Best Actor for his portrayal of an alcoholic writer in The Lost Weekend. From there he continued as a leading man well into the 1960s, appearing in several film noirs and occasionally cast as a villain. In 1953, Milland began working in television as both an actor and director. He alternated between the mediums of film and television for the remainder of his career. During the 1960s and 1970s, Milland frequently worked in science fiction and horror films. He also directed himself in four films.

The lists below chronicle Ray Milland's work in both film and television. Because his work in both mediums was extensive, the lists are divided on a decade-by-decade basis. The television section also contains episode listings for Milland's two series, Meet Mr. McNulty and Markham.

== Filmography ==
=== 1929–1940 ===
Year	Title	Role	Director	Co-stars	Notes
1928	Moulin Rouge	Theatre Patron	Ewald André Dupont	Olga Chekhova; Eve Gray; Jean Bradin	Uncredited
1929	Piccadilly	Extra in Nightclub Scene	Arnold Bennett	Gilda Gray; Anna May Wong	Uncredited
1929	The Flying Scotsman	Jim Edwards	Castleton Knight	Pauline Johnson; Moore Marriott	
1929	The Plaything	Ian	Castleton Knight	Marguerite Allan	
1929	The Informer	Sharpshooter	Arthur Robison	Lya De Putti; Lars Hanson	Uncredited
1930	Way for a Sailor	Ship's Officer	Sam Wood	John Gilbert; Wallace Beery	Uncredited
1930	The Lady from the Sea	Tom Roberts	Castleton Knight	Mona Goya	
1930	Passion Flower	Party guest with letter	William C. deMille	Kay Francis; Kay Johnson; Charles Bickford	Uncredited
1931	The Bachelor Father	Geoffrey Trent	Robert Z. Leonard	Marion Davies; C. Aubrey Smith	
1931	Strangers May Kiss	Third Admirer	George Fitzmaurice	Norma Shearer; Robert Montgomery	Uncredited
1931	Just a Gigolo	Freddie	Jack Conway	William Haines; Irene Purcell; C. Aubrey Smith	
1931	Bought!	Charles Carter Jr.	Archie Mayo	Constance Bennett; Ben Lyon	
1931	Ambassador Bill	King Lothar	Sam Taylor	Will Rogers	
1931	Blonde Crazy	Joe Reynolds	Roy Del Ruth	James Cagney; Joan Blondell	
1932	The Man Who Played God	Eddie	John G. Adolfi	George Arliss; Bette Davis	Uncredited
1932	Polly of the Circus	Church Usher	Alfred Santell	Marion Davies; Clark Gable	Uncredited
1932	But the Flesh Is Weak	Mr. Stewart (Man at Joan's Party)	Jack Conway	Robert Montgomery	Uncredited
1932	Payment Deferred	James Medland	Lothar Mendes	Charles Laughton; Maureen O'Sullivan	
1933	This Is the Life	Bob Travers	Albert de Courville	Gordon Harker; Binnie Hale	
1934	Bolero	Lord Robert Coray	Wesley Ruggles	George Raft; Carole Lombard	
1934	We're Not Dressing	Prince Michael Stofani	Norman Taurog	Bing Crosby; Carole Lombard	
1934	Orders Is Orders	Dashwood	Walter Forde	Charlotte Greenwood; James Gleason; Finlay Currie	
1934	Many Happy Returns	Ted Lambert	Norman McLeod	Gracie Allen; George Burns	
1934	Charlie Chan in London	Neil Howard	Eugene Forde	Warner Oland	
1934	Menace	Freddie Bastion	Ralph Murphy	Gertrude Michael; Paul Cavanagh	
1934	One Hour Late	Tony St. John	Ralph Murphy	Joe Morrison; Helen Twelvetrees; Conrad Nagel	
1935	The Gilded Lily	Charles Gray (Lord Granton)	Wesley Ruggles	Claudette Colbert; Fred MacMurray	
1935	Four Hours to Kill!	Carl Barrett	Mitchell Leisen	Richard Barthelmess; Helen Mack	
1935	Alias Mary Dow	Peter Marshall	Kurt Neumann	Sally Eilers	
1935	The Glass Key	Taylor Henry	Frank Tuttle	George Raft	
1936	Next Time We Love	Tommy Abbott	Edward Griffith	Margaret Sullavan; James Stewart	
1936	The Return of Sophie Lang	Jimmy Dawson	George Archainbaud	Gertrude Michael; Sir Guy Standing	
1936	The Big Broadcast of 1937	Bob Miller	Mitchell Leisen	Jack Benny; Shirley Ross	
1936	Three Smart Girls	Lord Michael Stuart	Henry Koster	Deanna Durbin	
1936	The Jungle Princess	Christopher Powell	Wilhelm Thiele	Dorothy Lamour	
1937	Bulldog Drummond Escapes	Capt. Hugh "Bulldog" Drummond	James Hogan	Heather Angel; Reginald Denny	
1937	Wings over Honolulu	Lieutenant Samuel Gilchrist	H. C. Potter	Wendy Barrie	
1937	Easy Living	John Ball, Jr.	Mitchell Leisen	Jean Arthur; Edward Arnold	
1937	Ebb Tide	Robert Herrick	James Hogan	Frances Farmer	Technicolor
1937	Wise Girl	John O'Halloran	Leigh Jason	Miriam Hopkins	
1938	Her Jungle Love	Bob Mitchell	George Archainbaud	Dorothy Lamour	Technicolor
1938	Tropic Holiday	Ken Warren	Theodore Reed	Dorothy Lamour	
1938	Men with Wings	Scott Barnes	William A. Wellman	Fred MacMurray; Louise Campbell	Technicolor
1938	Say It in French	Richard Carrington, Jr.	Andrew L. Stone	Olympe Bradna	
1939	Hotel Imperial	Lieutenant Nemassy	Robert Florey	Isa Miranda	
1939	Beau Geste	John Geste	William A. Wellman	Gary Cooper; Susan Hayward	
1939	Everything Happens at Night	Geoffrey Thompson	Irving Cummings	Sonja Henie; Robert Cummings	
1940	French Without Tears	Alan Howard	Anthony Asquith	Ellen Drew	
1940	Irene	Donald "Don" Marshall	Herbert Wilcox	Anna Neagle; Marsha Hunt	Technicolor sequence
1940	The Doctor Takes a Wife	Dr. Timothy Sterling	Alexander Hall	Loretta Young	
1940	Untamed	Dr. William Crawford	George Archainbaud	Patricia Morison; Akim Tamiroff	Technicolor
1940	Arise, My Love	Tom Martin	Mitchell Leisen	Claudette Colbert	

=== 1941–1950 ===
Year	Title	Role	Director	Co-stars	Notes
1941	I Wanted Wings	Jeff Young	Mitchell Leisen	William Holden; Constance Moore; Veronica Lake	
1941	Skylark	Tony Kenyon	Mark Sandrich	Claudette Colbert; Brian Aherne	
1941	Sullivan's Travels	Near-collision man on studio street	Preston Sturges	Joel McCrea; Veronica Lake; Robert Warwick	Uncredited
1942	The Lady Has Plans	Kenneth Clarence Harper	Sidney Lanfield	Paulette Goddard; Roland Young	
1942	Star Spangled Rhythm	Himself	George Marshall	Franchot Tone; Fred MacMurray	
1942	Reap the Wild Wind	Mr. Stephen "Steve" Tolliver	Cecil B. DeMille	John Wayne; Paulette Goddard	Technicolor
1942	Are Husbands Necessary?	George Cugat	Norman Taurog	Betty Field; Patricia Morison	
1942	The Major and the Minor	Major Philip Kirby	Billy Wilder	Ginger Rogers	
1943	Forever and a Day	Lieutenant William "Bill" Trimble	Multiple^{*}	Anna Neagle; C. Aubrey Smith	
1943	The Crystal Ball	Brad Cavanaugh	Elliott Nugent	Paulette Goddard	
1944	Lady in the Dark	Charley Johnson	Mitchell Leisen	Ginger Rogers	Technicolor
1944	The Uninvited	Roderick Fitzgerald	Lewis Allen	Gail Russell; Donald Crisp	
1944	Till We Meet Again	John	Frank Borzage	Barbara Britton	
1944	Ministry of Fear	Stephen Neale	Fritz Lang	Marjorie Reynolds	
1945	Kitty	Sir Hugh Marcy	Mitchell Leisen	Paulette Goddard	
1945	The Lost Weekend	Don Birnam	Billy Wilder	Jane Wyman; Phillip Terry; Howard Da Silva	Academy Award for Best Actor; Cannes Film Festival Award for Best Actor; Golden Globe Award for Best Actor - Motion Picture Drama; National Board of Review Award for Best Actor; New York Film Critics Circle Award for Best Actor
1946	The Well Groomed Bride	Lieutenant Dudley Briggs	Sidney Lanfield	Olivia de Havilland; Sonny Tufts	
1947	California	Jonathan Trumbo	John Farrow	Barbara Stanwyck; Barry Fitzgerald	Technicolor
1947	The Imperfect Lady	Clive Loring	Lewis Allen	Teresa Wright; Cedric Hardwicke	
1947	The Trouble with Women	Professor Gilbert Sedley	Sidney Lanfield	Teresa Wright; Brian Donlevy	
1947	Golden Earrings	Colonel Ralph Denistoun	Mitchell Leisen	Marlene Dietrich	
1947	Variety Girl	Himself	George Marshall	Mary Hatcher; Olga San Juan; DeForest Kelley	Technicolor sequence
1948	So Evil My Love	Mark Bellis	Lewis Allen	Ann Todd; Geraldine Fitzgerald	
1948	The Big Clock	George Stroud	John Farrow	Charles Laughton; Maureen O'Sullivan	
1948	Sealed Verdict	Major Robert Lawson	Lewis Allen	Florence Marly; Broderick Crawford	
1949	Alias Nick Beal	Nick Beal	John Farrow	Audrey Totter; Thomas Mitchell; George Macready	
1949	It Happens Every Spring	Professor Vernon K. Simpson	Lloyd Bacon	Jean Peters; Paul Douglas	
1950	A Woman of Distinction	Professor Alexander "Alec" Stevenson	Edward Buzzell	Rosalind Russell; Edmund Gwenn	
1950	A Life of Her Own	Steve Harleigh	George Cukor	Lana Turner; Tom Ewell	
1950	Copper Canyon	Johnny Carter	John Farrow	Hedy Lamarr	Technicolor

Directed by Edmund Goulding, Cedric Hardwicke, Frank Lloyd, Victor Saville, Robert Stevenson, Herbert Wilcox, and René Clair. Wilcox directed the sequence featuring Milland.

=== 1951–1960 ===
Year	Title	Role	Director	Co-stars	Notes
1951	Circle of Danger	Clay Douglas	Jacques Tourneur	Patricia Roc; Marius Goring	
1951	Night into Morning	Philip Ainley	Fletcher Markle	John Hodiak; Nancy Davis	
1951	Rhubarb	Eric Yeager	Arthur Lubin	Jan Sterling	
1951	Close to My Heart	Brad Sheridan	William Keighley	Gene Tierney	
1952	Bugles in the Afternoon	Kern Shafter	Roy Rowland	Forrest Tucker; George Reeves; Helena Carter	Technicolor
1952	Something to Live For	Alan Miller	George Stevens	Joan Fontaine; Teresa Wright	
1952	The Thief	Allan Fields	Russell Rouse	Rita Gam	Nominated — Golden Globe Award for Best Actor
1953	Jamaica Run	Patrick Fairlie	Lewis R. Foster	Arlene Dahl; Wendell Corey	
1953	Let's Do It Again	Gary Stuart	Alexander Hall	Jane Wyman	Technicolor
1954	Dial M for Murder	Tony Wendice	Alfred Hitchcock	Grace Kelly; Robert Cummings	3-D; WarnerColor
1955	The Girl in the Red Velvet Swing	Stanford White	Richard Fleischer	Joan Collins; Farley Granger	CinemaScope; Deluxe color
1955	A Man Alone	Wes Steele	Ray Milland	Mary Murphy; Ward Bond; Raymond Burr	Naturama; Trucolor
1956	Lisbon	Captain Robert John Evans	Ray Milland	Maureen O'Hara; Claude Rains	Trucolor
1956	Three Brave Men	Joe DiMarco	Philip Dunne	Frank Lovejoy; Ernest Borgnine; Nina Foch	CinemaScope
1957	The River's Edge	Nardo Denning	Allan Dwan	Anthony Quinn; Debra Paget	CinemaScope; Deluxe color
1957	High Flight	Wing Commander Rudge	John Gilling	Bernard Lee; Kenneth Haigh	CinemaScope
1958	The Safecracker	Colley Dawson	Ray Milland	Barry Jones	

=== 1961–1970 ===
Year	Title	Role	Director	Co-stars	Notes
1961	King of Kings	Satan (voice, uncredited)	Nicholas Ray	Jeffrey Hunter; Siobhán McKenna	Technicolor
1962	The Premature Burial	Guy Carrell	Roger Corman	Hazel Court	Panavision; Eastmancolor
1962	Panic in Year Zero!	Harry Baldwin	Ray Milland	Jean Hagen; Frankie Avalon	Pathécolor
1963	X: The Man with the X-ray Eyes	Dr. James Xavier	Roger Corman	Diana Van der Vlis; Don Rickles	
1964	Quick, Let's Get Married	Mario Forni	William Dieterle	Ginger Rogers; Barbara Eden	Eastmancolor
1968	Hostile Witness	Simon Crawford - Q.C.	Ray Milland	Sylvia Syms	Deluxe color
1970	Love Story	Oliver Barrett III	Arthur Hiller	Ryan O'Neal; Ali MacGraw	Color
1970	Company of Killers (Made for TV, but released theatrically)	George DeSalles	Jerry Thorpe	Van Johnson; Susan Oliver; Terry Carter	Technicolor

=== 1971–1984 ===
Year	Title	Role	Director	Co-stars	Notes
1972	Embassy	Ambassador	Gordon Hessler	Richard Roundtree; Chuck Connors	Color
1972	Frogs	Jason Crockett	George McCowan	Sam Elliott	Panavision; Color
1972	The Thing with Two Heads	Maxwell Kirshner	Lee Frost	Rosey Grier	Color
1973	The House in Nightmare Park	Stewart Henderson	Peter Sykes	Frankie Howerd	Technicolor
1973	The Big Game	Professor Pete Handley	Robert Day	Stephen Boyd; France Nuyen	Color
1973	Terror in the Wax Museum	Harry Flexner	Georg Fenady	Broderick Crawford; Elsa Lanchester	Color
1974	The Student Connection	Dr. Roger Melli	Rafael Romero Marchent	Sylva Koscina	Eastmancolor
1974	Gold	Hurry Hirschfeld	Peter R. Hunt	Roger Moore; Susannah York	Panavision; Technicolor
1975	Escape to Witch Mountain	Aristotle Bolt	John Hough	Eddie Albert; Kim Richards	Technicolor
1976	The Swiss Conspiracy	Johann Hurtil	Jack Arnold	David Janssen; Senta Berger; Elke Sommer	Color
1976	Aces High	Brigadier General Whale	Jack Gold	Malcolm McDowell; Christopher Plummer	Panavision; Technicolor
1976	The Last Tycoon	Fleishacker	Elia Kazan	Robert De Niro; Robert Mitchum	Panavision; Technicolor
1977	Oil!	The Boss (Stewart)	Mircea Drăgan	Stuart Whitman; Woody Strode	Color
1977	The Uncanny	Frank Richards	Denis Héroux	Peter Cushing; Susan Penhaligon; Joan Greenwood	Color
1977	The Pajama Girl Case	Inspector Thompson	Flavio Mogherini	Dalila Di Lazzaro; Mel Ferrer	Color
1978	Slavers	Hassan	Jürgen Goslar	Trevor Howard; Britt Ekland; Ron Ely	Eastmancolor
1978	Blackout	Richard Stafford	Eddy Matalon	Jim Mitchum; Robert Carradine	Color
1978	Battlestar Galactica (Theatrical release of television film)	Sire Uri	Richard A. Colla	Richard Hatch; Dirk Benedict; Lorne Greene	Sensurround; Technicolor
1978	Oliver's Story	Oliver Barrett III	John Korty	Ryan O'Neal; Candice Bergen	Color
1979	Survival Run	Professor	Larry Spiegel	Peter Graves; Vincent Van Patten	Color
1979	Game for Vultures	Colonel Brettle	James Fargo	Joan Collins; Richard Harris	Panavision; Color
1980	The Attic	Wendell	George Edwards	Carrie Snodgress	Color
1983	Starflight: The Plane That Couldn't Land (made for TV – released theatrically in Europe)	Q. T. Thornwell	Jerry Jameson	Lee Majors; Hal Linden; Lauren Hutton	Color
1984	The Sea Serpent	Professor Timothy Wallace	Amando de Ossorio	Timothy Bottoms; Taryn Power; Jared Martin	Color
1985	The Gold Key	Carl Bruhn	Richard Kutok	Jack Curtis Miller	(final film role), Color

== Television ==
=== General credits: 1953–1960 ===
Airdate	Title	Role	Co-stars
March 19, 1953	The 25th Annual Academy Awards	Himself (Co-Presenter: Short Subject Awards)	Bob Hope (host)
September 17, 1953	Meet Mr. McNutley (44 episodes — see below)	Professor Ray McNutley	Phyllis Avery
October 31, 1954	What's My Line?	Himself (Mystery Guest)	John Daly, Arlene Francis, Dorothy Kilgallen, Fred Allen
October 23, 1955	The Colgate Comedy Hour	Himself	Jack Carson (host)
April 11, 1956	Screen Directors Playhouse; Episode: "Markheim"	Roy Markheim	Rod Steiger
April 15, 1956	General Electric Theater; Episode: "That's the Man!"	Russel Kent	Nancy Davis, Hayden Rorke; Ronald Reagan (host)
October 3, 1956	Ford Television Theatre; Episode: "Catch at Straws"	District Attorney Peter Sloan (also director)	Kerwin Mathews
January 6, 1957	General Electric Theater; Episode: "Never Turn Back"	Woodward (also director)	Virginia Carroll
March 15, 1957	Schlitz Playhouse of Stars; Episode: "The Girl in the Grass"	Harry Carstairs (also director)	Fay Baker, Carolyn Jones
May 5, 1957	General Electric Theater; Episode: "Angel of Wrath"	John (also director)	Jeanne Bates, Howard McNear
December 8, 1957	General Electric Theater; Episode: "Eyes of a Stranger"	(Director only)	Tallulah Bankhead, Richard Denning
January 1, 1958	Father Knows Best; Episode: "Mister Beal Meets His Match"	Nick Beal	Robert Young, Jane Wyatt, Billy Gray
June 2, 1958	Suspicion; Episode: "Death Watch"	(Director only)	Edmond O'Brien
June 23, 1958	Suspicion; Episode: "Eye for an Eye"	Roy Markham	Macdonald Carey, Andrew Duggan
September 14, 1958	Decision; Episode: "Markheim"	Markheim	Rod Steiger
November 2, 1958	General Electric Theater; Episode: "Battle for a Soul"	Caradoc Williams (also director)	Marjorie Bennett
February 2, 1959	Goodyear Theatre; Episode: "A London Affair"	Binyon	Gia Scala
February 13, 1959	Death Valley Days; Episode: "Stagecoach Spy"	Himself - Host	Claudia Barrett, Brad Johnson, Richard Powers
May 2, 1959	Markham (59 episodes — see below)	Roy Markham	
November 1, 1959	What's My Line?	Guest Panelist	John Daly, Harry Belafonte

=== General credits: 1961–1970 ===
Airdate	Title	Role	Co-stars
April 9, 1961	Celebrity Golf	Himself	
April 11, 1961	Thriller; Episode: "Yours Truly, Jack the Ripper"	(Director only)	Boris Karloff (host), John Williams
December 26, 1961	The Dick Powell Show; Episode: "Open Season"	(Director only)	Dick Powell (host), Dorothy Malone, Dennis O'Keefe
January 9, 1962	Alcoa Premiere; Episode: "Pattern of Guilt"	Keith Briscoe	Joanna Moore
February 2, 1962	Here's Hollywood	Himself	Cynthia Pepper
September 27, 1963	The Alfred Hitchcock Hour; Season 2 Episode 1: "A Home Away from Home"	Dr. Howard Fennick	Alfred Hitchcock (host)
November 3, 1963	The DuPont Show of the Week; Episode: "The Silver Burro"	Investigator	Carroll O'Connor
November 21, 1965	What's My Line?	Himself (Mystery Guest)	John Daly, Arlene Francis, Bennett Cerf, Helen Gurley Brown, Tony Randall
March 6, 1966	The Ed Sullivan Show	Simon Crawford	Ed Sullivan (host), Frankie Avalon, John Byner
April 5, 1969	The Jackie Gleason Show	Himself	Jackie Gleason (host), Frank Sinatra Jr.
December 9, 1969	Daughter of the Mind (television film)	Professor Constable	Don Murray, Gene Tierney
January 2, 1970	Bracken's World; Episode: "Focus on a Gun"	Ray Milland cameo	Peter Haskell, Roger Bowen
September 25, 1970	The Name of the Game; Episode: "A Love to Remember"	Jonathan Booker	Gene Barry, Lee Grant, Tom Bosley, J. D. Cannon

=== General credits: 1971–1980 ===
Airdate	Title	Role	Co-stars
March 9, 1971	River of Gold (1971 film) (television film)	Evelyn Rose	Suzanne Pleshette, Dack Rambo
May 11, 1971	The Tonight Show Starring Johnny Carson	Himself	Johnny Carson (host), Della Reese
August 10, 1971	Mantrap	Himself	Selma Diamond, Margot Kidder, Phyllis Kirk, Sue Lyon, Stefanie Powers, Carol Wayne
August 11, 1971	The Tonight Show Starring Johnny Carson	Himself	Johnny Carson (host), Abbe Lane
September 15, 1971	Night Gallery; Episode: "The Hand of Borgus Weems"	Dr. Archibald Ravadon	Rod Serling (host), George Maharis, Joan Huntington
October 6, 1971	Columbo; Episode: "Death Lends a Hand"	Arthur Kennicut	Peter Falk, Robert Culp
November 5, 1971	Black Noon (television film)	Caleb Hobbs	Roy Thinnes, Yvette Mimieux, Gloria Grahame, Henry Silva
June 23, 1972	The Tonight Show Starring Johnny Carson	Himself	Johnny Carson (host), Wayne Newton, Sally Struthers
September 1, 1972	The Tonight Show Starring Johnny Carson	Himself	Johnny Carson (host), Charo, Richard Dawson
October 15, 1972	Columbo; Episode: "The Greenhouse Jungle"	Jarvis Goodland	Peter Falk, Bob Dishy
October 25, 1972	Cool Million; Episode: "Hunt for a Lonely Girl"	Neil Fitzsimmons	James Farentino
January 14, 1975	The Dead Don't Die (television film)	Jim Moss/Varrick	George Hamilton, Linda Cristal, Ralph Meeker
March 23, 1975	Ellery Queen (television film)	Carson McKell	Jim Hutton, David Wayne, Kim Hunter, John Hillerman, Nancy Kovack
November 19, 1975	This Is Your Life	Himself	Eamonn Andrews (host)
February 1, 1976	Rich Man, Poor Man (miniseries)	Duncan Calderwood: Emmy Award for Outstanding Continuing Performance by a Supporting Actor in a Drama Series	Peter Strauss, Nick Nolte, Steve Allen, Edward Asner, Bill Bixby
September 21, 1976	Rich Man, Poor Man Book II; Episode: "Chapter I"	Duncan Calderwood	Peter Strauss, Gregg Henry, Susan Blakely, William Smith, Susan Sullivan
October 29, 1976	Look What's Happened to Rosemary's Baby (television film)	Roman Castevet	Stephen McHattie, Patty Duke, Broderick Crawford, Ruth Gordon, Lloyd Haynes, David Huffman, Tina Louise, George Maharis, Donna Mills
November 12, 1976	Mayday at 40,000 Feet! (television film)	Dr. Joseph Mannheim	David Janssen, Don Meredith
February 10, 1977	Seventh Avenue (miniseries)	Douglas Fredericks	Steven Keats, Jane Seymour, Anne Archer
May 9, 1977	Testimony of Two Men (miniseries)	Jonas Witherby	David Birney, Barbara Parkins, Steve Forrest, Ralph Bellamy, Theodore Bikel, Tom Bosley, Barry Brown, J. D. Cannon, Dan Dailey, Randolph Mantooth, Cameron Mitchell
February 3, 1978	Cruise Into Terror (television film)	Dr. Isiah Bakkun	Dirk Benedict, Frank Converse, John Forsythe, Christopher George, Lynda Day George, Jo Ann Harris, Lee Meriwether, Hugh O'Brian, Stella Stevens, Marshall Thompson
February 12, 1978	The Hardy Boys/Nancy Drew Mysteries; Episode: "Voodoo Doll: Part 1"	Dr. Orrin Thatcher	Shaun Cassidy, Parker Stevenson
February 19, 1978	The Hardy Boys/Nancy Drew Mysteries; Episode: "Voodoo Doll: Part 2"	Dr. Orrin Thatcher	Shaun Cassidy, Parker Stevenson
September 17, 1978	Battlestar Galactica; Episode: "Saga of a Star World"	Sire Uri	Richard Hatch, Dirk Benedict, Lorne Greene, Lew Ayres
November 4, 1978	Fantasy Island; Episode: "Let the Goodtimes Roll/Nightmare/The Tiger"	Colonel James Weston	Ricardo Montalbán, Hervé Villechaize
April 3, 1979	The Darker Side of Terror (television film)	Professor Meredith	Robert Forster, Adrienne Barbeau
September 15, 1979	The Love Boat; Episode: "Alaska Wedding Cruise: Buddy and Portia's Story/Julie's Story/Carol and Doug's Story/Peter and Alicia's Story"	Peter Bradbury	Eleanor Parker, Lorne Greene, Audra Lindley
April 30, 1980	Charlie's Angels; Episode: "One Love … Two Angels: Part 1"	Oliver Barrow	Jaclyn Smith, Cheryl Ladd, Shelley Hack
May 12, 1980	The Dream Merchants (television film)	Lawrence Radford	Mark Harmon, Vincent Gardenia, Morgan Fairchild, Brianne Leary, Robert Picardo, Eve Arden, Kaye Ballard, Morgan Brittany, Red Buttons, Robert Culp, Howard Duff, José Ferrer, Robert Goulet, David Groh, Carolyn Jones

=== General credits: 1981–1986 ===
Airdate	Title	Role	Co-stars
July 14, 1981	Our Family Business (television film)	Tony	Ted Danson, Christopher Mayer, Vera Miles, David Morse
January 19, 1982	Hart to Hart; Episode: "My Hart Belongs to Daddy"	Stephen Harrison Edwards	Robert Wagner, Stefanie Powers, Lionel Stander, Samantha Eggar
September 20, 1982	The Royal Romance of Charles and Diana (television film)	Mr. Griffiths	Catherine Oxenberg, Christopher Baines, Olivia de Havilland, Dana Wynter, Stewart Granger
February 27, 1983	Starflight: The Plane That Couldn't Land (television film)	Q. T. Thornwell	Lee Majors, Hal Linden, Lauren Hutton
June 19, 1983	Cave-In! (television film)	Professor Harrison Soames	Lonny Chapman, Dennis Cole, Leslie Nielsen, Julie Sommars, James Olson
November 22, 1983	Hart to Hart; Episode: "Long Lost Love"	Stephen Edwards	Robert Wagner, Stefanie Powers, Lionel Stander
December 23, 1984	The Masks of Death (television film)	Home Secretary	Peter Cushing, John Mills, Anne Baxter, Gordon Jackson, Susan Penhaligon

=== Meet Mr. McNutley episodes ===
#	Date	Title
1.	September 17, 1953	"Meet Mr. McNutley"
2.	September 24, 1953	Birthday Presents
3.	October 1, 1953	Babes in the Woods
4.	October 8, 1953	Episode #1.4
5.	October 15, 1953	The Faculty Dance
6.	October 22, 1953	Episode #1.6
7.	October 29, 1953	Episode #1.7
8.	November 5, 1953	Skylark
9.	November 12, 1953	The Perfect Marriage
10.	November 19, 1953	Ray Plays Cupid
11.	November 26, 1953	Happy Anniversary
12.	December 3, 1953	House Party
13.	December 10, 1953	The New Job
14.	December 17, 1953	Episode #1.14
15.	December 24, 1953	The Christmas Story
16.	December 31, 1953	New Dresses
17.	January 7, 1954	The Checking Account
18.	January 14, 1954	Hobbies
19.	January 21, 1954	Helpful Hand
20.	January 28, 1954	The Camping Trip
21.	February 4, 1954	The New Car
22.	February 11, 1954	Peggy's Old Flame
23.	February 18, 1954	Dean for a Day
24.	February 25, 1954	Ray's Other Life
25.	March 4, 1954	The Egg and Ray
26.	March 11, 1954	The Tree
27.	March 18, 1954	Swimming Problem
28.	March 25, 1954	Masquerade Ball
29.	April 1, 1954	Ray's Promotion
30.	April 8, 1954	Civic Improvement
31.	April 15, 1954	Back in Uniform
32.	April 22, 1954	School Girl Crush
33.	April 29, 1954	Fashion Model
34.	May 6, 1954	Adult Education
35.	May 13, 1954	Happy Home
36.	May 20, 1954	Peggy's Night Out
37.	May 27, 1954	The Most Glamorous Professor
38.	June 3, 1954	Dancing Lesson
39.	June 10, 1954	Ray's Nephew
40.	June 17, 1954	Vacation Days
41.	January 1, 1955	Faculty Wife
42.	January 13, 1955	Call Me Dad
43.	March 3, 1955	Jury Duty
44.	March 10, 1955	Tryout

=== Markham episodes ===
#	Date	Title
1.	May 2, 1959	A Princely Sum
2.	May 9, 1959	Woman of Arles
3.	May 16, 1959	Paris Encounter
4.	May 23, 1959	The Marble Face
5.	May 30, 1959	The Human Factor
6.	June 6, 1959	The Seamark
7.	June 13, 1959	Three Steps to Murder
8.	June 20, 1959	The Glass Diamond
9.	June 27, 1959	Vendetta in Venice
10.	July 4, 1959	The Last Bullet
11.	July 11, 1959	Forty-Two on a Rope
12.	July 18, 1959	The Duelists
13.	July 27, 1959	The Counterfeit Stamps
14.	August 1, 1959	We Are All Suspect
15.	August 8, 1959	The Bay of the Dead
16.	August 17, 1959	The Other Side of the Wall
17.	August 22, 1959	Deadline Date
18.	August 29, 1959	Girl on the Rocks
19.	September 19, 1959	Grave and Present Danger
20.	September 26, 1959	Double Negative
21.	October 3, 1959	The Nephews
22.	October 10, 1959	The Long Haul
23.	October 17, 1959	Mutation
24.	October 31, 1959	The Father
25.	November 7, 1959	Incident in Bel Air
26.	November 14, 1959	Roundtrip to Mozambique
27.	November 21, 1959	Strange Visitor
28.	December 5, 1959	The Altar
29.	December 19, 1959	No Flies on Friday
30.	January 9, 1960	Candy Store Jungle
31.	January 16, 1960	Sing a Song of Murder
32.	January 23, 1960	The Ambitious Wife
33.	January 28, 1960	Events Leading Up to the Crime
34.	February 4, 1960	A Coffin for Cinderella
35.	February 11, 1960	Deadly Promise
36.	February 25, 1960	One for the Money
37.	March 3, 1960	Image of Love
38.	March 10, 1960	The Long Search
39.	March 24, 1960	The Shape of Evil
40.	April 7, 1960	The Searing Flame
41.	April 14, 1960	Fateful Reunion
42.	April 21, 1960	The Last Oasis
43.	April 28, 1960	Anxious Angel
44.	May 5, 1960	The Sitting Duck
45.	May 12, 1960	The Snarled Web
46.	May 26, 1960	Coercion
47.	June 2, 1960	The Man from Salzburg
48.	June 9, 1960	The Silken Cord
49.	June 16, 1960	Escorts a La Carte
50.	June 30, 1960	The Cruelest Thief
51.	July 7, 1960	13 Avenida Muerte
52.	July 21, 1960	A Cry from the Penthouse
53.	August 4, 1960	The Young Conspirator
54.	August 11, 1960	The Country Mouse
55.	August 18, 1960	Crash in the Desert
56.	August 25, 1960	Counterpoint
57.	September 1, 1960	The Snowman
58.	September 8, 1960	The Bad Spell
59.	September 15, 1960	A Matter of Identity

== Radio appearances ==
Year	Programme	Episode/source
1946	This Is Hollywood	The Seventh Veil
1946	The Jack Benny Program	The Lost Weekend
1946	Screen Guild Players	The Lost Weekend
1953	Lux Radio Theatre	Close to My Heart

== Stage appearances ==
Year	Title	Role	Venue
1966	Hostile Witness	Simon Crawford	Music Box Theatre, New York City
