= Frank Partos =

Hungarian-American screenwriter

- Born: Ferenc Pártos; July 2, 1901; Budapest, Austria-Hungary
- Died: December 23, 1956 (aged 55); Los Angeles, California, U.S.
- Occupation: Screenwriter
- Years active: 1932–1956

Frank Partos (born Ferenc Pártos; July 2, 1901 – December 23, 1956) was a Hungarian-American screenwriter and an early executive committee member of the Screen Actors Guild, which he helped found.

== Emigration from Europe ==
Born in Budapest on July 2, 1901, Pártos began as a clerk and, sailed to the United States as a steerage passenger on board the S/S Mount Carroll, which departed the Port of Hamburg, Germany, on April 28, 1921, and arrived at the Port of New York on May 10. According to the ship's passenger manifest, his destination was to his stepfather Ignatz Reitzer of 214 Hope Avenue, in Passaic, New Jersey.

== Career ==
He arrived in California in the late 1920s with a letter of introduction to Irving Thalberg of Metro-Goldwyn-Mayer. Partos was given a position as a reader and later given a book by Vicki Baum to write a synopsis. Thalberg decided to make Grand Hotel (1932) based on that synopsis and had Partos work as a screenwriter on the project. Partos did not get screen credit and, because of that slight, left MGM.

In the 1930s, he was a staff writer at Paramount Pictures, during the early years to the talkie era. In 1939 he moved to RKO Radio Pictures, where he collaborated on the early noir film Stranger on the Third Floor (1940). During the mid-1930s Partos worked extensively with screenwriter Charles Brackett, and was Brackett's first choice for a writing partner. In 1944, he co-wrote the screenplay for The Uninvited, an early haunted house story starring Ray Milland and Gail Russell. He shared an Academy Award nomination for The Snake Pit (1948) with Millen Brand. He also co-wrote the 1951 film noir The House on Telegraph Hill, directed by Robert Wise. Partos died December 23, 1956.

== Selected filmography ==
- Her Bodyguard (1933)
- The Jungle Princess (1936)
- Night of Mystery (1937)
- Rio (1939)
- Stranger on the Third Floor (1940)
- The Uninvited (1944)
- The Snake Pit (1948)
- The House on Telegraph Hill (1951)
- Night Without Sleep (1952)
- Port Afrique (1956)
