= The Flying Scotsman (1929 film) =

1929 film

- Pauline Johnson walks along the edge of the locomotive, a genuine stunt in the climax of the film.
- Directed by: Castleton Knight
- Written by: Victor Kendall; Garnett Weston; Freeman Crofts (advisor)
- Starring: Moore Marriott; Pauline Johnson; Ray Milland; Alec Hurley
- Cinematography: Theodor Sparkuhl
- Music by: Idris Lewis (uncredited)
- Production company: British International Pictures
- Distributed by: Pathescope Film
- Release dates: May 1929; March 1930 (sound version)
- Running time: 50 minutes
- Country: United Kingdom
- Languages: Sound (Part-Talkie); English Intertitles

The Flying Scotsman (1929) by Castleton Knight

The Flying Scotsman is a 1929 British black and white part-talkie film directed by Castleton Knight and starring Moore Marriott, Pauline Johnson, Ray Milland and Alec Hurley. It was written by Victor Kendall and Garnett Weston. The film is set on the Flying Scotsman train from London to Edinburgh, also featuring the famous locomotive LNER Class A3 4472 Flying Scotsman. In addition to sequences with audible dialogue or talking sequences, the film features a synchronized musical score and sound effects along with English intertitles. The film is notable for being the first leading acting role of Ray Milland, and for its daring stunts performed aboard the moving train.

== Plot ==
Engine driver Bob is due to retire from his job after years of distinguished service. On Bob's last day working aboard the famous Flying Scotsman, a disgruntled fireman, dismissed after being reported for drinking at work, decides to get his revenge on Bob (who reported him to the company) by causing an accident. Meanwhile, the fireman's amorous young replacement has fallen in love with a beautiful girl, whose father, unbeknown to him, happens to be Bob (and who has also boarded the train in an attempt to stop the villain).

== Cast ==
- Moore Marriott as Old Bob White
- Pauline Johnson as Joan White, his daughter
- Ray Milland (as Raymond Milland) as Jim Edwards
- Alec Hurley as Crow (the villain)

== Background ==
The film is notable for being the first lead role of Welsh actor Ray Milland, who went on to stardom in Hollywood during the 1940s. Milland, then appearing under his birth name of Alfred Jones, was spotted by director Castleton Knight while he was working as an extra on The Informer which was being shot on a neighbouring stage.

Milland, in his autobiography, recalls that it was on this film that it was suggested he adopt his stage name; and chose Milland from the Mill lands area of his Welsh home town of Neath. Milland starred in two further Knight-directed films, The Lady from the Sea and The Plaything.

Pauline Johnson was a leading British silent actress of her age, although appeared in few films after 1930. Moore Marriott was only 43 when he appeared in the film, but is already playing an ageing engine driver.

== Production ==
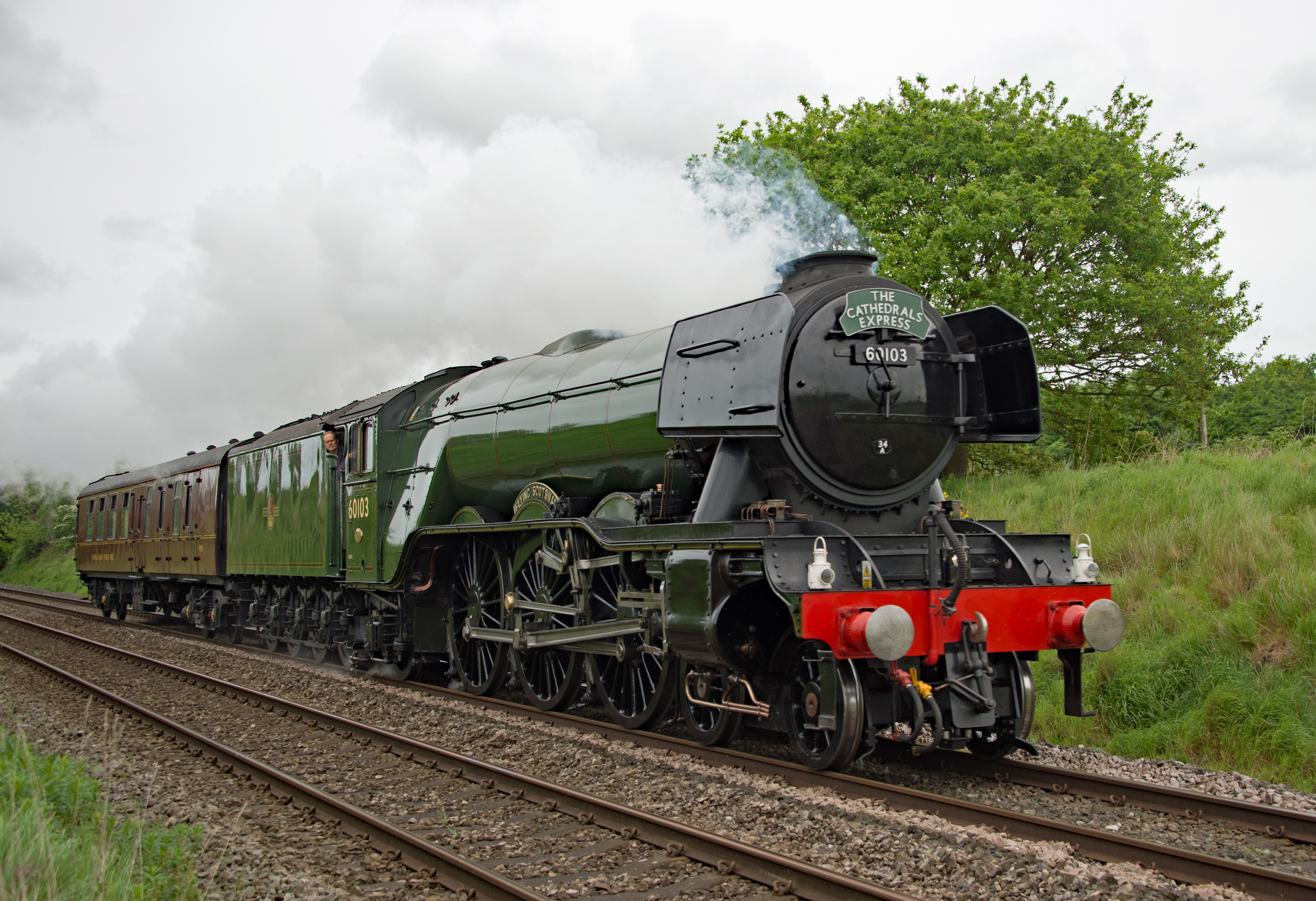
The film featured the famous LNER Class A3 Flying Scotsman

The film was shot with co-operation of the London and North Eastern Railway company, who allocated their flagship Class A1 locomotive, the eponymous 4472 Flying Scotsman along with use of the Hertford Loop Line for filming. This locomotive was extensively used by the LNER for promotional purposes, having been a star of the 1924 British Empire Exhibition and breaking a number of speed records. At the time of its appearance in this film, the locomotive is technically an A1 (only being rebuilt and classified "A3" in 1947). The locomotive is the only member of its class to have been preserved.

All of the stunts were filmed on the moving locomotive with the actors. Most dangerously, at one point actress Pauline Johnson walks along the edge of the moving train wearing high heeled shoes, transferring from the coaches to the locomotive while travelling at speed.

Allegedly Sir Nigel Gresley, chief engineer of the LNER, was so concerned at the unsafe practices shown in the film, such as the decoupling of the locomotive from the train while in motion, he insisted that a disclaimer was placed in the opening credits explaining that such things could not happen on the LNER. The notice stated "For the purposes of the film, dramatic licence has been taken in regard to the safety equipment used on The Flying Scotsman". Film historian John Huntley claimed that Gresley subsequently forbade any further filming on the LNER. The locomotive, 4472, despite this, continued to gain fame during several events later made known by the film.

Along with Alfred Hitchcock's Blackmail, this was one of the first British sound films. Like that film, it was initially intended to be a silent film, with the decision to switch to speech made during production. As a result, early scenes feature speech captions and music instead of recorded voices, with character dialogue only appearing towards the end of the film. It is unclear whether it was initially released with sound, with some film historians such as John Huntley claiming it predates Blackmail to be the earliest British sound film. The BFI film database claims that the soundtrack was added in March 1930.

== Reception ==
Kine Weekly wrote: "Simple railway melodrama, but convincingly acted and produced, with good atmosphere and acting. The whole thing is pleasant entertainment, and very creditable to all concerned. ... Moore Marriott is excellently in character as Bob, while Raymond Milland is quite one of the most attractive juveniles we have seen on the English screen; moreover he is a very good actor. Pauline Johnson is a charming heroine, and it is to her credit that the 'stunting' on the train was done by her."
