= The Uninvited (1944 film) =

- Theatrical release poster
- Directed by: Lewis Allen
- Screenplay by: Dodie Smith; Frank Partos
- Based on: Uneasy Freehold by Dorothy Macardle
- Starring: Ray Milland; Ruth Hussey; Donald Crisp; Cornelia Otis Skinner; Gail Russell
- Cinematography: Charles Lang Jr.
- Edited by: Doane Harrison
- Music by: Victor Young
- Production company: Paramount Pictures, Inc.
- Distributed by: Paramount Pictures, Inc.
- Release dates: 10 February 1944 (Washington, D.C.)
- Running time: 98 minutes
- Country: United States
- Language: English

The Uninvited is a 1944 American supernatural horror film that was directed by Lewis Allen and stars Ray Milland, Ruth Hussey, and Donald Crisp. The film is based on Dorothy Macardle's novel Uneasy Freehold (1941), which was published in the United States as The Uninvited (1942) and deals with a brother and sister who purchase a house in Cornwall, England, that is plagued by paranormal events. The film is part of a cycle of supernatural-themed films that began appearing in the mid-1940s. Dodie Smith began writing the film, and Frank Partos was brought in by his friend, associate producer Charles Brackett. Brackett wanted to have the film directed by Alfred Hitchcock but could not organize plans with him, so Allen directed it. Filming began on April 16, 1943; Allen found working with Gail Russell, who was inexperienced and began crying several times, to be the most difficult part of filming.

The Uninvited was released in Washington, D.C., on February 10, 1944, and was one of the highest-grossing films of the year. On its release, it received positive reviews from trade papers Variety, Harrison's Reports, and The Monthly Film Bulletin. Critics were surprised the film's supernatural elements were presented as reality and that they found it genuinely frightening. The film was also praised in retrospective reviews. In the 1940s, director of photography Charles Lang Jr. was nominated for an Academy Award for his work on the film, which was later adapted into two radio plays. The film did not create a wave of supernatural-themed horror films but led to further work by director Allen with Russell and with Milland. The song "Stella by Starlight", which was created for the film, became a popular jazz standard that was performed by Frank Sinatra, Charlie Parker, and Miles Davis.

== Plot ==
In 1937, during a holiday to the coast of Cornwall, London music critic and composer Roderick "Rick" Fitzgerald and his sister Pamela fall in love with Windward House, an abandoned seaside home, and buy it from Commander Beech at the unusually low price of GB£1200 (equivalent to £70,676 in 2025). Rick and Pamela meet Beech's 20-year-old granddaughter Stella Meredith, who lives with her grandfather in the nearby town of Biddlecombe. Stella is deeply attached to the house, and its sale upsets her, despite its being where her mother Mary Meredith fell to her death from a nearby cliff seventeen years earlier. After Rick encounters Stella in town and spends the day with her, the commander forbids Stella to see Rick or to enter Windward House. She defies his orders, and Rick becomes infatuated with her.

The Fitzgeralds' initial enchantment with the house diminishes when they unlock an artist's studio, where they feel an inexplicable chill. Just before dawn, Rick hears the sobs of an unseen woman, which Pamela investigates while awaiting Rick's return with their Irish housekeeper Lizzie Flynn. The superstitious Lizzie notices a peculiar draft on the stairs. Lizzie's cat refuses to go upstairs, and the Fitzgeralds' dog escapes the house permanently. Rick and Pamela realize Windward House is haunted.

Stella visits Windward House for dinner and senses a spirit. Rather than fearing it, she associates the calming presence with her mother. Stella suddenly runs towards the cliff from which her mother fell to her death; Rick catches her just in time. Stella does not remember the near-fatal incident. The Fitzgeralds and the town physician Dr. Scott investigate and learn Stella's father, a painter, had had an affair with his model, a Spanish gypsy named Carmel.

Rick stages a séance to persuade Stella that her mother wants her to stay away from Windward House; however, the ghost takes over and says it is guarding Stella. Stella becomes possessed by the spirit and begins muttering in Spanish. Beech is distressed by Stella's renewed involvement with Windward and sends her to a sanatorium run by Miss Holloway, Mary's friend and confidante. The Fitzgeralds visit the sanatorium, unaware Stella is there; they question Holloway, who says Mary found out about the affair and took Carmel to Paris, leaving her there. Carmel subsequently returned to England, abducted the infant Stella from Windward House, and during a confrontation, pushed Mary off the cliff to her death. After Mary's death, Holloway took care of Carmel, who had contracted pneumonia and eventually died of it. Looking through his predecessor's records, Dr. Scott discovers Holloway may have hastened Carmel's death.

Dr. Scott is called away to care for an ailing Beech, who tells him Stella is at the sanatorium. Rick, Pam, and Scott telephone Miss Holloway to inform her they are on their way. Holloway tells Stella the Fitzgeralds have invited her to live with them. Stella happily takes the train home. Holloway tells Rick, Pam, and Scott that Stella is on her way to Windward House. There, Stella finds her grandfather in the studio; with the last of his strength, Beech begs Stella to leave, but she remains at his side. When a ghost manifests, Beech succumbs to a heart attack. Stella at first welcomes the ghost, believing it to be her mother, but then the apparition frightens her and she flees towards the cliff.

Rick and Dr. Scott arrive just in time to rescue Stella from the crumbling cliff. Back inside, the group return to the physician's journal, which the friendly spirit has opened at a certain page. They discover Carmel gave birth to a child in Paris, where Stella was born. The group realizes Carmel is Stella's mother, freeing Carmel's spirit to leave Windward, but something evil has remained. After sending everyone away, Rick confronts the spirit of Mary Meredith, telling her they are no longer afraid of her and that she no longer has any power over them. Defeated, Mary's spirit departs.

== Cast ==
Cast according to the American Film Institute film database.

- Ray Milland as Roderick "Rick" Fitzgerald
- Ruth Hussey as Pamela Fitzgerald
- Donald Crisp as Commander Beech
- Cornelia Otis Skinner as Miss Holloway
- Dorothy Stickney as Miss Bird
- Barbara Everest as Lizzie Flynn
- Alan Napier as Dr. Scott
- Gail Russell as Stella Meredith
- Jessica Newcombe as Miss Ellis
- John Kieran as Foreword narrator

Uncredited:

- Holmes Herbert as Charlie Jessup
- Betty Farrington as Voice of Mary Meredith
- Queenie Leonard as Mrs. Taylor
- Moyna MacGill as Mrs. Coatesworthy
- Rita Page as Annie, a maid
- Lynda Grey as Ghost of Mary Meredith
- Ivan F. Simpson as Will Hardy, tobacconist

== Production ==
During and immediately after World War II, a small cycle of supernatural-themed films were released. These include A Guy Named Joe (1943), A Matter of Life and Death (1946), The Ghost and Mrs. Muir (1947), and Portrait of Jennie (1948). In 1944, Jack Cartwright wrote in Motion Picture Daily there was a trend for "higher bracket horror pictures" around this period. This led to the production of similarly themed films such as Dead of Night (1945) and The Uninvited. Associate producer Charles Brackett wrote about working with Dodie Smith on The Uninvited on September 29, 1942, noting in his journal the two had "the opening of the pictured doped out with her. The end is still in the mist ... " Brackett and Smith discussed the script until on October 15, when Brackett suggested having Smith work with Frank Partos, a Hungarian-born screenwriter who went to Hollywood as a story scout in 1928. Brackett and Partos had worked together at Paramount in May 1934 for Her Master's Voice and remained friends. According to Brackett, Smith responded negatively to this suggestion and said to him, "You're worse than Sidney Franklin – he only changed one scene." On October 16, Brackett received a phone call from Smith, who stated she thought he was right about the screenplay and apologized to him. On October 20, Brackett met with Erik Charell, who suggested including "the sound of heart-beats, a fire that goes out, petals that fall from roses and ectoplasm climbing the stairs". Brackett met with Alfred Hitchcock on November 14, gave him a copy of The Uninvited, and asked him to read it. By November 21, Hitchcock was unable to work on The Uninvited but gave Brackett suggestions for the film. By January 1, 1943, Smith was still communicating with Brackett about The Uninvited; Brackett noted he was "rather disappointed in her revisions, which are always small and niggling," and contemplated taking her off the project.

Lewis Allen worked in both West End and Broadway theater for Gilbert Miller, and was connected with agent Louis Shurr, who connected him with Buddy DeSylva, an executive at Paramount Pictures. DeSylva had seen a play adaptation of Pride and Prejudice that Allen had directed and offered him work at Paramount. According to Allen, he had about six months of apprenticeship, initially at Paramount, working with directors including Preston Sturges and Mark Sandrich. During this period, Allen became friends with Brackett. By January 18, Allen had been reading the script of The Uninvited for DeSylva and noted the film's slow pace. By January 21, they had worked on a faster-paced and lighter introduction. By January 29, De Sylva had contacted Brackett, stating he wanted The Uninvited to be produced in March. On February 6, Brackett asked Allen to direct The Uninvited; It would be the first film Lewis Allen would direct. Brackett continue working on the script for The Uninvited and completed it on February 20. On March 2, Brackett read the script to Smith, who approved it. Brackett commented Smith was "afraid of the job of writing out scenes skeletonized by Frank [Partos], but is going over our first sequences seeing if she can approve them and if so going to work".

According to Allen, he had a lot of influence in the casting of the film. In his March 24 journal entry, Brackett said Allen, Partos, and himself were "knocked over the head by [the] extraordinary beauty" of Gail Russell and, after seeing her perform in Henry Aldrich Gets Glamour, commented, "she wasn't bad – not a brilliant actress but something which can really dazzle the beholders, if Lew can squeeze any kind of a performance out of her". Allen said he was not particularly happy with the casting of Russell, noting, "when she read for me, it was pretty bad". Also among the cast was Cornelia Otis Skinner, who at the time was working for Paramount on a screenplay for Our Hearts Were Young and Gay.

Filming of The Uninvited began on April 16, 1943. Filming took place near Fort Bragg, California. Scenes of village exteriors and sailing ships were filmed on studio backlots. On April 19, Brackett had a budget meeting, during which he unsuccessfully tried to get the film's schedule extended from 42 days to 50. On April 23, on viewing the daily rushes, Brackett said Russell's performance was "amateur and adenoidal", and Dodie Smith echoed similar distaste for Russell. Filming with Russell proved difficult; on May 3, Brackett wrote she would cry on set with her mother, claiming she had a sore throat, but in fact, Russell was crying because Allen had made her wear a hat for a scene for which she did not want to wear it. Allen said Russell's performance in the film was "manufactured" and added: "She could only do about five or six lines, and then she'd burst into tears." According to Allen, Russell, who had not drunk alcohol before, began drinking it to calm herself at the suggestion of the head of make-up on set. Issues also rose with Ray Milland, who on May 8 required eleven takes to film a scene. Allen spoke positively about working with Milland, stating he was very supportive of Allen, especially as a first-time film director. Allen also stated Milland would take Russell aside and continuously practice her lines with her. Allen felt the only person who reacted poorly to Russell was Donald Crisp, who did not like working with people whom he deemed to be non-professional actors. Filming was completed by mid-June 1943; in his journal, Brackett stated June 15 was the final filming day for The Uninvited.

== Release ==
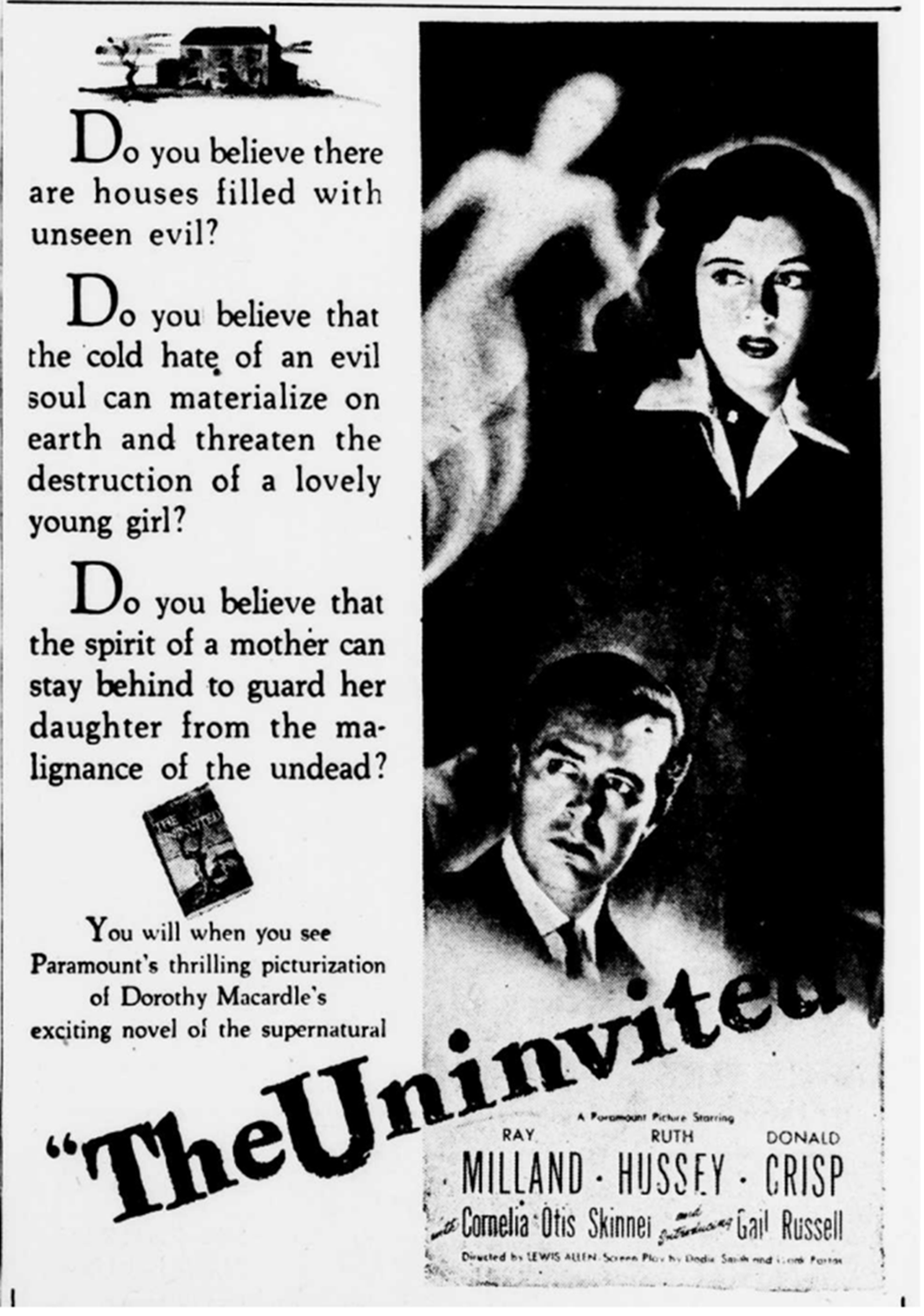
Theatrical advertisement from 1944

The Uninvited was distributed by Paramount Pictures and was shown in Washington, D.C., on February 10, 1944, and in New York on February 26 the same year. According to the National Box Office Digest, it was among the highest-grossing pictures in the United States, with rentals of over US$500,000 (equivalent to $9,144,612 in 2025). The film did not gross as much as Paramount's Going My Way (1944) and Double Indemnity (1944), but it out-grossed Allen's other film of the same year, Our Hearts Were Young and Gay (1944), as well as Universal's horror films House of Frankenstein (1944) and The Invisible Man's Revenge (1944).

William Hays received a letter from Father Brendan Larson, one of the executives of the National Legion of Decency regarding The Uninvited, which noted:

In certain theaters large audiences of questionable type attend this film at unusual hours. The impression created by their presence was that they had been previously informed of certain erotic and esoteric elements in this film.

In the same letter, Larson also commented on the way Holloway gazes at Mary's portrait and the way they had planned to spend their lives together:

There is a distinct contrast in the masculinity of Miss Holloway's character and the dainty femininity of Mary's portrait.

Paramount said it did not intend to convey a lesbian message in the film.

On November 18, 1946, Milland performed in a radio broadcast of The Uninvited, which Allen hosted for The Lady Esther Screen Guild Theater. Milland performed a second radio adaptation of the film in 1949 for Screen Directors Playhouse.

The Uninvited was first released on home video on August 27, 1992, by MCA/Universal Home Video The Criterion Collection released the film on DVD and Blu-ray on October 22, 2013. Criterion's release was a new digital 2K resolution transfer from a 35 mm safety duplicate negative made from a nitrate composite, fine-grain print. Both radio adaptations of The Uninvited were included on the disc.

== Reception ==
=== Contemporaneous reviews ===
In contemporaneous reviews, some critics praised the film for being frightening and compared it to other horror films. Karl Krug, writing in the Pittsburgh Sun-Telegraph, praised the film and called it "cold shiver melodrama at its best, and it uses no melodramatic claptrap or sliding panel hocus-pocus to achieve its cold chill ends". Krug noted that the film is told with a "deadly seriousness and very little comedy relief. Its characters are intelligent adult human beings, but there is no earthly explanation offered for the ghosts that haunt the house", and commented that audiences should not "look for the conventional 'horror' yarn, all tricked up with the sleight of hand gadgets that usually accompany such stuff in the movies. This one will really give you the shudders, and there are a few places where the suspense will freeze the marrow in your bones, to say nothing of the blood in your veins." These statements were echoed by other reviewers, including Boyd Martin of The Courier-Journal, who commented that he generally loathed "these so-called shocker films" and that The Uninvited is "a most intelligent thriller". Outside the United States, Herbert Whittaker of The Gazette Montreal said: "The movie-goer who gazes stoney-eyed at the usual type of screen thriller should be able to achieve genuine goose-pimples as this one unravels", noting that the film does not set itself in a "cardboard grave yard, knee-deep in that animated whipped cream that Hollywood technicals like to imagine resembles fog" and that the film "will have you clutching the arms of your theatre-seat".

James Agee, writing for The Nation, said, The Uninvited makes "a mediocre story and a lot of slabby cliches into an unusually good scare-picture. It seems to me harder to get a fright than a laugh, and I experienced thirty-five first-class jolts." Clyde Rowen of The Nebraska State Journal and Star said the film "easily rates as the best mystery movie of recent months ... not too scary, but exciting enough to hold an audience". Critics were surprised to find that the film's ghosts turned out to be real; according to Rowen: "Phantoms in the ordinary motion picture of this sort would automatically turn out to be somebody's cat or an envious neighbor attempting to devaluate a vacant house." A review in the Monthly Film Bulletin said: "It remains a question, however, whether such a film should ever be made, producing visual evidence of unexplained occult phenomena which, to say the least, have never yet been photographed." The Uninvited received praise from other trade papers, including Variety and Harrison's Reports.

Critics also praised the cast, with many singling out Gail Russell. According to Whittaker, "the picture belongs to a 20-year-old Gail Russell" who "creates a most favorable impression. There's a sort of dewy charm to Miss Russell that is as unusual on the screen as it is appealing." Krug also praised Russell as "a revelation among the newcomers" and said: "This youngster can do something beside pose as she radiates the terror that besets her." Rowen said Russell is "beautiful and talented, will no doubt be heard from in future Paramount pictures". Martin noted "fine direction by Lewis Allen" and praised the cast – specifically Crisp, Milland, Hussey, Skinner, Napier and Russell – who make the film "a drama rich in suspense". A review in the Monthly Film Bulletin found the film very good technically, with "some beautiful coastal scenery" and attempts at reconstructing a seaside village, as well as "beautiful interiors" of the house. Bosley Crowther of The New York Times also commented on the cast, saying that Milland and Hussey "do nicely as the couple who get themselves involved, being sufficiently humorous in spots to seem plausibly real" and that Russell is "wistful and gracious as a curiously moonstruck girl". Crowther commented on some plot elements, noting that the intellectual aspects of the story "had better be left unquestioned" because of "glaring confusion in the wherefore and why of what goes on" and that the back-stories of the ghosts are not explained.

=== Retrospective reviews ===
In his 1967 book An Illustrated History of the Horror Film, Carlos Clarens wrote: "Among the seventeen horror films released in the United States during 1944, the best and most unusual was The Uninvited. ... An adult, polite ghost tale, lacking the disquieting undertow of The Turn of the Screw, the movie had a pleasantly chilling feminine touch ... most evident in the deft dosage of its well-calculated shivers: a flower that wilts in seconds, a dog that refuses to climb the stairs, a scent of mimosa that impregnates a room, a moonlit romantic piano piece that develops into a sombre concerto." Phil Edwards wrote in a 1982 article in Starburst that The Uninvited is "one of the few genuinely creepy and one hundred per cent supernatural films that Hollywood has turned out, successfully in all departments", which is "at its best when merely suggesting the horrible, a point which the over-rated and non-ghostly Poltergeist made only too clear". Edwards commented on critiques of the film's lightness, finding it "quite entertaining" and serving to "set film within its generic context ... quite within keeping for films of this nature at the time".

Phil Hardy's work The Encyclopedia of Horror Movies (1986) calls The Uninvited a "superior ghost story" that is "too mechanically constructed to be genuinely chilling", but noted that "the film's ghostly manifestations – a flower that wilts in seconds, a dog that refuses to go upstairs and a pair of doors opening for no reason – nonetheless have a real frisson about them". Pauline Kael, in her book 5001 Nights at the Movies, said that despite the picture's popularity, "it doesn't come anywhere near fulfilling one's initial hopes that it will be a first-rate ghost movie". In the book The Definitive Guide to Horror Movies, James Marriott said The Uninvited feels more dated than Universal Studios' gothic horror films but that the visuals "achieve an effective eeriness". Marriott found Milland's character a "boorishly rational man" and critiqued the plot because the villains are women who are not in relationships with men or who refuse to bear children.

== Legacy ==
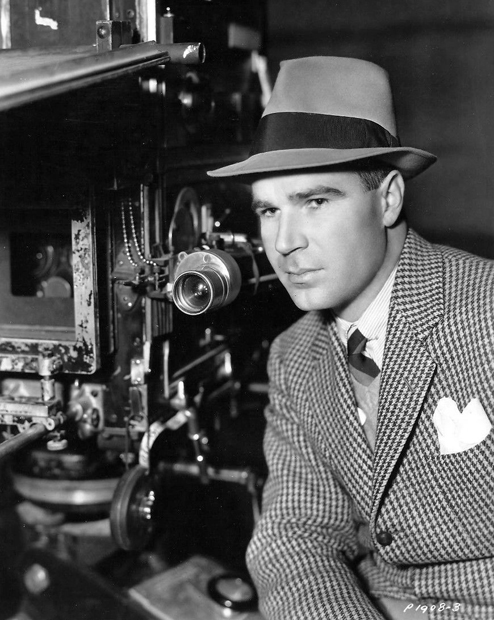
Charles Lang was nominated for an Academy Award for Best Cinematography, Black-and-White for his work on The Uninvited.

At the 17th Academy Awards, cinematographer Charles Lang was nominated for an Academy Award for Best Cinematography, Black-and-White, for his work on The Uninvited. The award went to Joseph LaShelle for his work on Laura.

In 1997, director Lewis Allen stated:

I saw The Uninvited about two years ago, and what amazed me about the picture was the fact that it was almost 50 years old and it wasn't very dated. I must be congratulated because most movies of that era look stagy. I must have done a very good job! I treated The Uninvited as though I believed in it. That's my whole explanation for that.

The Uninvited did not encourage Hollywood studios to create a wave of scary ghost films. Allen again worked with Russell on both of his next films, Our Hearts Were Young and Gay (1944) and The Unseen (1945).

The musical piece "Stella by Starlight" was later adapted into a popular song with music by Victor Young, and lyrics by Ned Washington. It was later recorded by many artists, including Harry James and Frank Sinatra. Charlie Parker covered it in 1952, and Stan Getz, followed by more than a dozen other artists, recorded the song over the following two years. The song was performed by several jazz musicians, particularly those with an affinity for cool jazz, including Chet Baker, Bill Evans, and Miles Davis.

== See also ==
- List of American films of 1944
- List of horror films of the 1940s
- List of Paramount Pictures films (1940–1949)
- Ray Milland filmography
- Ruth Hussey filmography
