= Ruth Hussey filmography =

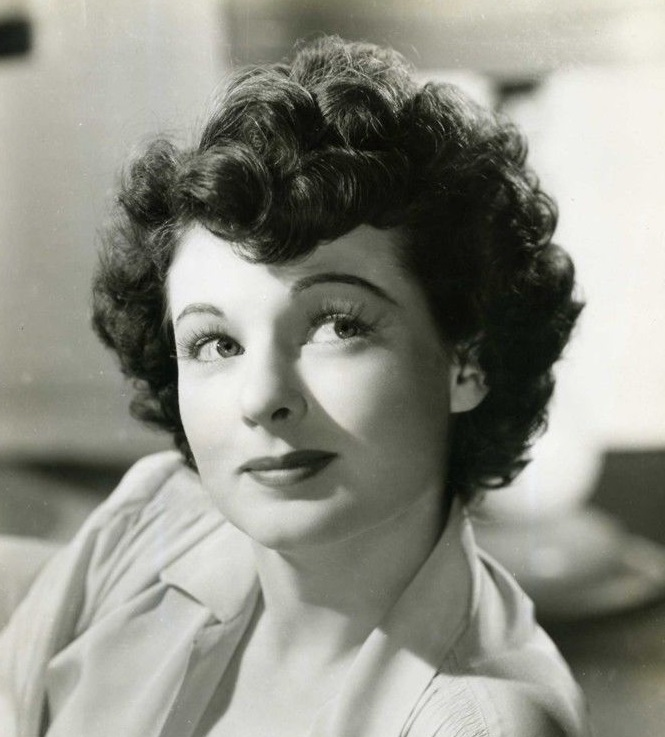
Hussey in 1945

This is the complete filmography of actress Ruth Hussey (October 30, 1911 – April 19, 2005). Originally a native of Providence, Rhode Island, Hussey began her career in summer stock and modeling before entering films in the late 1930s through Metro-Goldwyn-Mayer Studios. In a career that lasted over 40 years, and totaled 69 credits all together, she made a name for herself as a notable actress earning an Academy Award nomination for Best Supporting Actress along the way for her portrayal of the cynical magazine photographer Elizabeth Imbrie in The Philadelphia Story.

== Film and television appearances ==
Date	Title	Role	Notes
1937	Big City	Mayor's Secretary	Uncredited
1937	Madame X	Annette	
1938	Man-Proof	Jane	(scenes deleted)
1938	Judge Hardy's Children	Margaret 'Maggie' Lee	
1938	Hold That Kiss	Nadine Piermont	
1938	Marie Antoinette	Duchess de Polignac	Uncredited
1938	Rich Man, Poor Girl	Joan Thayer	
1938	Time Out for Murder	Peggy Norton	
1938	Spring Madness	Kate McKim	
1939	Honolulu	Eve	
1939	Within the Law	Mary Turner	
1939	Maisie	Sybil Ames	
1939	The Women	Miss Watts	
1939	Blackmail	Helen Ingram	
1939	Fast and Furious	Lily Cole	
1939	Another Thin Man	Dorothy Waters	
1940	Northwest Passage	Elizabeth Browne	
1940	Susan and God	Charlotte	
1940	The Philadelphia Story	Elizabeth Imbrie	
1940	Flight Command	Lorna Gary	
1941	Free and Easy	Martha Gray	
1941	Our Wife	Professor Susan Drake	
1941	Married Bachelor	Norma Haven	
1941	H.M. Pulham, Esq.	Kay Motford	
1942	Pierre of the Plains	Daisy Denton	
1942	Tennessee Johnson	Eliza McCardle Johnson	
1943	Tender Comrade	Barbara Thomas	
1944	The Uninvited	Pamela Fitzgerald	
1944	Marine Raiders	Lieutenant Ellen Foster	
1945	Bedside Manner	Dr. Hedy Fredericks, MD	
1948	I, Jane Doe	Eve Meredith Curtis	
1949	The Great Gatsby	Jordan Baker	
1950	Louisa	Meg Norton	
1950	The Nash Airflyte Theater		Episode: "Borrowed Memory"
1950	Pulitzer Prize Playhouse	Isabel Amberson	Episode:"The Magnificent Ambersons"
1950	Mr. Music	Lorna Marvis	
1950–1957	Lux Video Theatre	Various roles	6 episodes
1951	That's My Boy	Ann Jackson	
1951	Celanese Theatre	Cora Simon	Episode: "Counsellor-at-Law"
1951–1952	Family Theater	The Virgin Mary / Mary	Episodes: "Hill Number One: A Story of Faith and Inspiration" (1951) "That I May See" (1951) "The World's Greatest Mother" (1952)
1952	Woman of the North Country	Christine Powell, later Christine Ramlo	
1952	Stars and Stripes Forever	Jennie Sousa	
1953	The Ford Television Theatre	Allison Scott	Episode: "This Is My Heart"
1953	The Lady Wants Mink	Nora Connors	
1953	Footlights Theater	Allison Scott	Episode: "This Is My Heart"
1953	The Revlon Mirror Theater		Episode: "Flight from Home"
1953–1954	General Electric Theater	Emma	Episode: "Winners Never Lose" (1953) "To Lift a Feather" (1954)
1954	Studio One in Hollywood	Nancy Edison	Episode: "The Boy Who Changed the World"
1954	The Elgin Hour	Fran Tillman	Episode: "Warm Clay"
1955	Producers' Showcase	Mary Haines	Episode: "The Women"
1955	Shower of Stars	Agnes Carroll	Episode: "Time Out for Ginger"
1955	Jane Wyman Presents The Fireside Theatre	Nancy	Episode: "Woman at Sea"
1955–1956	Science Fiction Theatre	Various roles	Episode: "One Hundred Years Young" (1955) "The Unguided Missile" (1956)
1955–1957	Climax!	Alice Moore / Martha / Katherine Benson	3 episodes
1955–1960	The Christophers		Episodes: "Washington as a Young Man" (1955) "Parents Lead the Way" (1960)
1956	Playwrights '56	Mrs. Anderson	Episode: "Flight"
1956	Alfred Hitchcock Presents	Paula Hudson	Season 1 Episode 36: "Mink"
1956–1957	Studio 57	Nancy / Maxine Smith	Episodes: "The Magic Glass" (1956) "Woman at Sea" (1957)
1956–1958	The Red Skelton Hour	Ruby / Department Store Owner	Episodes: "San Fernando Goes Straight (1956) "San Fernando's Filibuster" (1958)
1960	The Facts of Life	Mary Gilbert	
1960	Joyful Hour	Mary	TV movie
1961	Insight		Episode: The Agitator
1963	Vacation Playhouse	Nurse Edie Ramsey	Episode: "Come a-Runnin'"
1965	Valentine's Day	Mrs. Freeman	Episodes: "I'll Cry at My Wedding"
1970	The Resurrection of Broncho Billy	Voice Over	Short
1971	Marcus Welby, M.D.	Laura Benson	Episode: "The Best Is Yet to Be"
1972	The Jimmy Stewart Show	Lydia Harper	Episode: "Aunts in My Plans"
1973	The New Perry Mason	Corinne Warner	Episode: "The Case of the Horoscope Homicide"
1973	My Darling Daughters' Anniversary	Maggie Cartwright	TV movie, (final film role)
