= A Woman of Distinction =

1950 film by Edward Buzzell

- Directed by: Edward Buzzell
- Screenplay by: Charles Hoffman; Frank Tashlin (additional dialogue)
- Story by: Ian McLellan Hunter; Hugo Butler
- Produced by: Buddy Adler
- Starring: Rosalind Russell; Ray Milland; Edmund Gwenn
- Cinematography: Joseph Walker
- Edited by: Charles Nelson
- Music by: Werner R. Heymann
- Production company: Columbia Pictures
- Distributed by: Columbia Pictures
- Release date: March 16, 1950
- Running time: 85 minutes
- Country: United States
- Language: English

A Woman of Distinction is a 1950 American screwball romantic comedy film directed by Edward Buzzell and starring Rosalind Russell, Ray Milland and Edmund Gwenn. It was produced and distributed by Columbia Pictures.

== Plot ==
Born to a wealthy and well-respected New England family, Susan Manning Middlecott excelled at school from a young age. Earning her bachelor's, master's and doctorate, she became a teacher, then enlisted during WWII, staying afterwards to care for French orphans.

Shortly after her return, Susan becomes dean of a New England school called Benton College and it is her whole life, apart from living with dad Mark and raising her adopted daughter Louisa. Featured on the cover of Time Magazine for her accomplishments, a French department colleague is interested in her, but she insists she has no time for a relationship.

British astronomy professor Alec Stevenson, arrives to the US to present at his lecture-tour. The event's publicist Teddy Evans is told he has a locket belonging to Susan that he wants to deliver to her. Locating the jeweler the necklace is from, Alec is able to get her Connecticut address.

For publicity's sake, as she fears people might not be interested in an astronomy lecture, Teddy invents a story that Alec and Susan are involved in a romance. Upon seeing the article, the miffed Susan boards a train to Boston to confront him.

Unaware that Alec has been to her campus and is now on the same train, Susan inadvertently meets him on it. A photographer snaps their picture getting off the train as a livid Susan hits Alec with her purse, and Teddy makes sure their spat makes the newspapers.

Susan immediately boards a train back to Connecticut, and Alec follows. Believing that Alec is a publicity seeker, she rejects his attempts to explain, but he does manage to tell her the locket was given to him by a concentration camp prisoner named Benoit during the war. Alec tells her how he merely was attempting to bring it to her at the soldier's request. When he calls her cold for not responding appropriately, she again hits him with the bag as they disembark and a photo is taken.

Once the photos are printed in the paper, Susan's dad invites Alec over and takes a shine to him. As she has not been with anyone, he encourages her to find time for a love life. To get away, Susan takes her daughter to the family's cabin, but Mark also invites Alec, as his private observatory is there.

In the morning, Susan has arranged to go riding with a group of women friends. Alec insists on joining them, expecting horses, but it is a bicycling outing. He then has some mishaps with the bike; stopping by a lake, Susan falls into plants he insists are poison ivy. Alec insists on applying mud to avoid itching.

Alec and Susan attend a college dance, but another misunderstanding prompts her to leave with a student. The student then promptly gets Susan in trouble by drag racing with another car.

Teddy plants a story that Alec is the real father of Susan's little girl. Susan's job is now in jeopardy from the continuing bad publicity. Alec tries to cover for her, claiming he and Susan are actually married, but a professor colleague does likewise, complicating Susan's situation further.

In the end, Susan is forced to decide what is important to her, her professional life or her personal one. Frustrated that the board would rather believe idle gossip, she resigns and then hurries to catch Alec at the train station.

== Cast ==
- Rosalind Russell as Susan Manning Middlecott
- Ray Milland as Prof. Alexander "Alec" Stevenson
- Edmund Gwenn as Mark "JM" Middlecott
- Janis Carter as Teddy Evans
- Mary Jane Saunders as Louisa Middlecott
- Lucille Ball as herself (uncredited)
- Gale Gordon as Railway Station Clerk (uncredited)
- Jean Willes as Pearl, Switchboard Operator (uncredited)
