= The Gold Key =

The Gold Key is 1985 American direct-to-video film. It was Ray Milland's final film role.

== Production ==
The film sold 20,000 outlets across the country in 1995. The viewers submitted the first correct entry by January and won $100,000. It was set in Chicago. Milland said: "They didn't give me a full script, and they shot other scenes outside of the scene I was in. I don't know what this is all about."
