= Ray Milland =

Welsh actor (1907–1986)

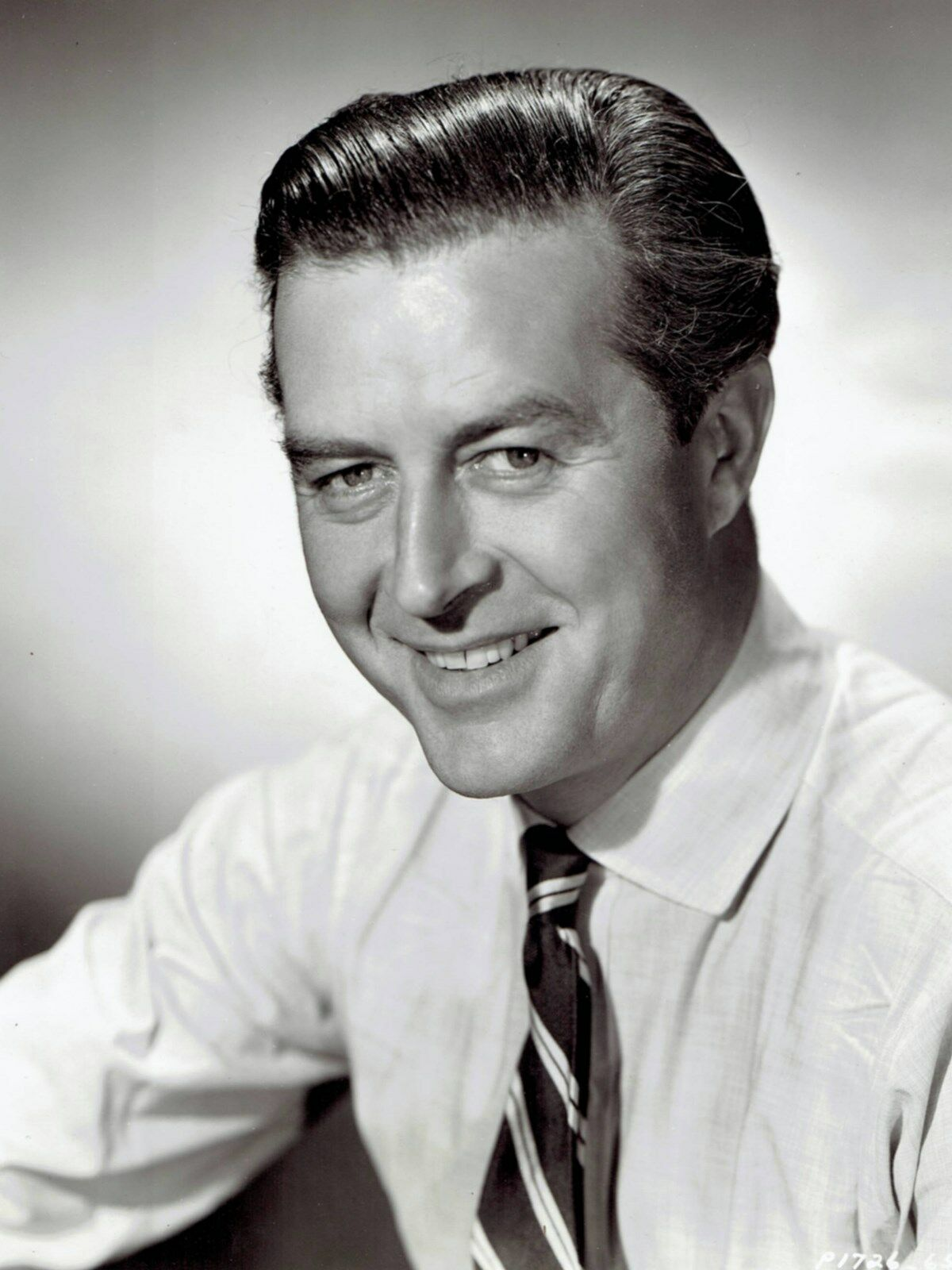
- Milland in 1947
- Born: Alfred Reginald Jones; 3 January 1907; Neath, Glamorgan, Wales
- Died: 10 March 1986 (aged 79); Torrance, California, U.S.
- Citizenship: United Kingdom; United States (from 1940s)
- Occupations: Actor; film director
- Years active: 1928–1985
- Spouse: Muriel Weber (m. 1932)
- Children: 2

Ray Milland (born Alfred Reginald Jones; 3 January 1907 – 10 March 1986) was a Welsh and American actor. Initially known as a star of light comedies, he achieved a dramatic breakthrough with his portrayal of an alcoholic writer in Billy Wilder's The Lost Weekend (1945). His performance earned him the Cannes Film Festival Award for Best Actor, a Golden Globe Award, and ultimately an Academy Award—the first such accolades for any Welsh-born actor.

Before becoming an actor, Milland served in the Household Cavalry of the British Army, becoming a proficient marksman, horseman and aeroplane pilot. He left the army to pursue a career in acting and appeared as an extra in several British productions before getting his first major role in The Flying Scotsman (1929). This led to a nine-month contract with MGM, and he moved to the United States, where he worked as a stock actor. After his MGM contract ended, Milland was picked up by Paramount, which used him in a range of lesser speaking parts, usually as an English character. He was lent to Universal for the Deanna Durbin musical Three Smart Girls (1936), and its success led to Milland's playing the lead role in The Jungle Princess (also 1936) alongside new starlet Dorothy Lamour. The film was quite successful and raised both to stardom. Milland remained with Paramount for almost 20 years.

Milland appeared in many other notable films, including Easy Living (1937), Beau Geste (1939), Billy Wilder's The Major and the Minor (1942), opposite a corrupt John Wayne in Reap the Wild Wind (1942), The Uninvited (1944), Fritz Lang's Ministry of Fear (1944), The Big Clock (1948) and The Thief (1952)—for which he was nominated for his second Golden Globe. Two standout films later in his career include Alfred Hitchcock's Dial M for Murder (1954) and Love Story (1970). After leaving Paramount, he began directing and moved into television acting. Once Paramount Pictures' highest-paid actor, Milland co-starred alongside many of the most popular actresses of the time, including Gene Tierney, Jean Arthur, Grace Kelly, Lana Turner, Marlene Dietrich, Maureen O'Hara, Ginger Rogers, Jane Wyman, Loretta Young and Veronica Lake.

== Early life ==
Milland was born Alfred Reginald Jones (Note: The birth name Alfred Reginald Jones and the birth date of 3 January 1907 are from the Oxford Dictionary of National Biography. Other sources give a different date of birth and birth name. Milland's obituary in The New York Times gave 3 January 1905 with the name Reginald Truscott-Jones. Encyclopædia Britannica gives 3 January 1907 and Reginald Truscott-Jones.) on 3 January 1907 in Neath, Wales, the son of Elizabeth Annie (née Truscott) and steel mill superintendent Alfred Jones. He attended local elementary school at Neath and later at Radyr, following his parents' separation. Milland spent a short time at sea prior to one year's attendance at King's College school in Cardiff. Milland was an accomplished rider and undertook work at his uncle's horse-breeding farm. Of his parents, he wrote in his 1974 autobiography:

My father was not a cruel or harsh man. Just a very quiet one. I think he was an incurable romantic and consequently a little afraid of his emotions and perhaps ashamed of them ... he had been a young hussar in the Boer War and had been present at the relief of Mafeking. He never held long conversations with anyone, except perhaps with me, possibly because I was the only other male in our family. The household consisted of my mother, a rather flighty and coquettish woman much concerned with propriety and what the neighbours thought.

At the age of 18, Milland passed the entrance examination to University College Cardiff but did not pursue studies there.

=== Household Cavalry ===
Prior to becoming an actor, Milland served in the Royal Horse Guards of the Household Cavalry, in 1925. An expert shot, he became a member of his squadron's rifle team, winning many prestigious competitions, including the Bisley Match in England. He won the British Army Championship in both pistol and rifle marksmanship.

While he was stationed in London, Milland met a dancer, Margot St Leger, and through her was introduced to the American actress Estelle Brody. Brody queried Milland's commitment to his army career, which led him into buying himself out of the army in 1928 with the hope of becoming an actor. (According to one account, he was able to support himself with a £17,000 inheritance from his aunt. Another said that he was forced to drop out when his father refused to continue subsidising him.)

== Career ==
=== Name ===
It is suggested that Milland's adopted name is derived as a fusion of that of his stepfather Mullane and a locality in his home town of Neath known as 'The Millands' (The Mill Lands). In his early acting career he was billed both as Spike Milland and Raymond Milland.

=== Early acting appearances ===
His first appearance on film was as an uncredited extra on the E.A. Dupont film Piccadilly (1929). After some unproductive extra work, which never reached the screen, he signed with a talent agent named Frank Zeitlin on the recommendation of fellow actor Jack Raine.

His prowess as a marksman earned him work as an extra at the British International Pictures studio in Arthur Robison's production of The Informer (1929), the first screen version of the Liam O'Flaherty novel. While he was working on The Informer, he was asked to test for a production being shot on a neighbouring stage. Milland made a favourable impression on director Castleton Knight, and was hired for his first acting role as Jim Edwards in The Flying Scotsman (also 1929). In his autobiography, Milland recalls that on this film set, it was suggested that he adopt a stage name; he chose Milland from the "mill lands" area of his Welsh hometown of Neath.

His work on The Flying Scotsman resulted in him being granted a six-month contract over the course of which Milland starred in two more Knight-directed films, The Lady from the Sea and The Plaything (both 1929). Believing that his acting was poor, and that he had won his film roles through his looks alone, Milland decided to gain some stage experience to improve his ability. After hearing that club owner Bobby Page was financing a touring company, Milland approached him in hopes of work. He was given the role of second lead in a production of Sam Shipman and Max Marcin's The Woman in Room 13. Despite being released from the play after five weeks, Milland felt that he had gained valuable acting experience.

=== Move to the US, 1930–1932 ===
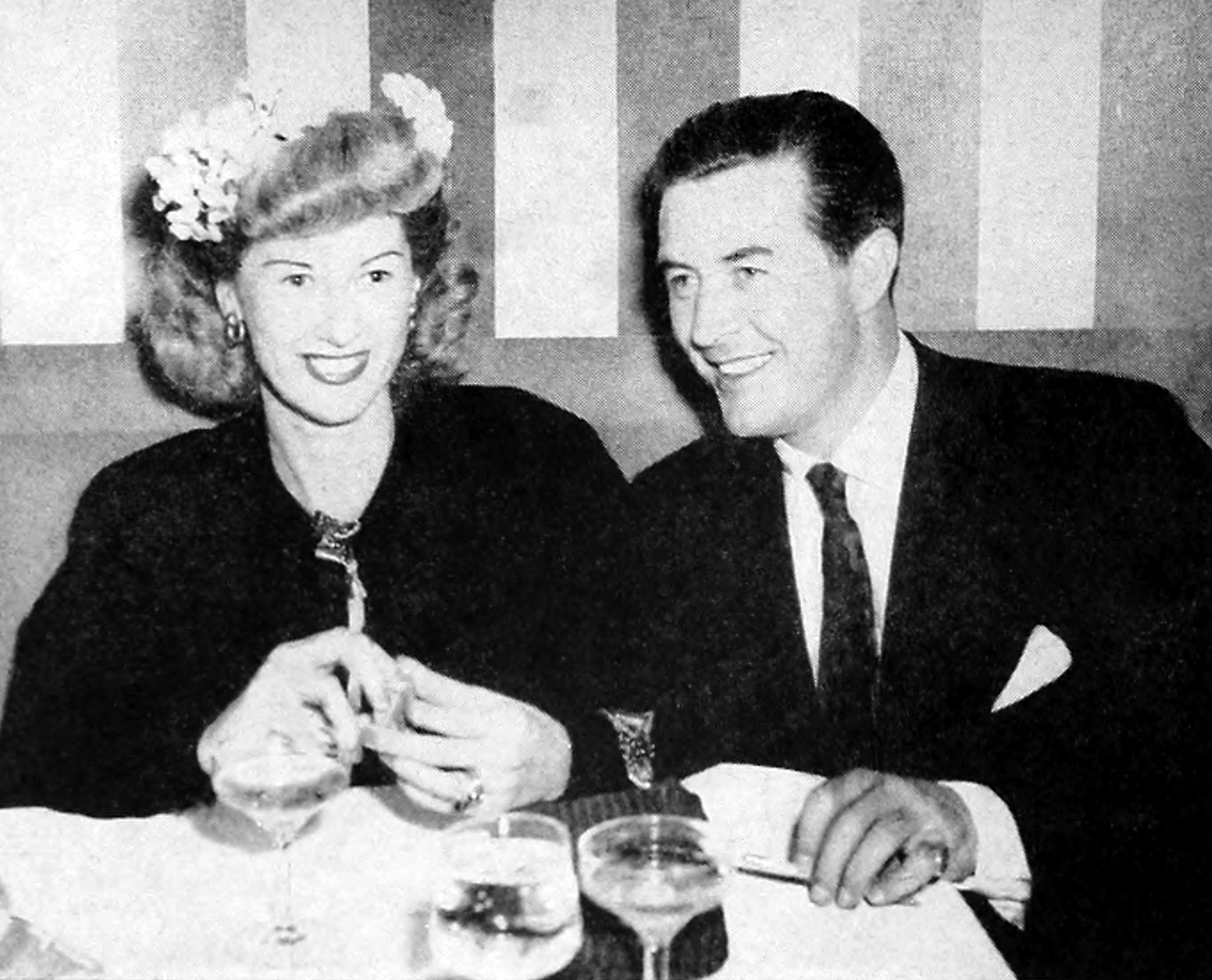
Mal and Ray Milland at a Hollywood nightclub in 1942

In between plays, Milland was approached by MGM vice-president Robert Rubin, who had seen the film The Flying Scotsman. MGM offered Milland a nine-month contract at $175 a week, based in Hollywood. He accepted, leaving the United Kingdom in August 1930. MGM used Milland as a 'stock' player, selecting him for small speaking parts in mainstream productions.

Milland's first experience in making a Hollywood film resulted in a humiliating scene on the set of Son of India (1931), when the film's director Jacques Feyder berated Milland and criticized his acting in front of the entire crew. Despite this setback, the studio executives talked Milland into staying in Hollywood, and in 1930, he appeared in his first US film Passion Flower. Over the next two years, Milland appeared in minor parts for MGM and a few films for which he was lent to Warner Bros; he was often uncredited. His largest role during this period was as Charles Laughton's nephew in Payment Deferred (1932).

While in this first period working in the United States, Milland met Muriel Frances Weber, whom he always called "Mal", a student at the University of Southern California. Within eight months of first meeting, the two were married. The ceremony took place on 30 September 1932 at the Riverside Mission Inn. The couple had a son, Daniel, and adopted a daughter, Victoria.

Shortly after making Payment Deferred, Milland found himself out of work when MGM failed to renew his contract. He spent five months in the US attempting to find further acting work, but after little success and a strained relationship with his father-in-law he decided to head back to Britain, hoping that two years spent in Hollywood would lead to roles in British films. Milland cashed in his contracted first-class return ticket to Britain and found an alternative, cheaper way back home. Muriel remained in the States to finish her studies, and Milland found temporary accommodation in Earl's Court in London.

=== Return to Britain ===
Milland found life in Britain difficult, receiving little regular work, although he finally found parts in two British films, This Is the Life and Orders Is Orders (both 1933). Neither was a breakthrough role.

=== Back in the US and Bolero ===
Then, in 1933, Roosevelt's reforms to the U.S. banking sector led to a temporary weakness in the dollar, allowing Milland to afford a return to the United States. He returned to California, and found a small flat on Sunset Boulevard, promising Muriel that he would buy a home once he was financially stable.

With little prospect of finding acting work, Milland took on varied jobs, including working for a gambling bookie. He decided to find regular employment and through connections made during his time in the UK, he was offered the job of assistant manager of a Shell gas station on Sunset and Clark.

On his return from his successful Shell interview, Milland passed by the gates of Paramount Pictures, where he was approached by casting director Joe Egli. Paramount was filming the George Raft picture Bolero (released in February 1934), but an injury to another British actor had left the studio looking for an urgent replacement. Egli offered Milland a two-week contract, at ten times the salary the assistant job would pay. Milland took the acting role.

After completing Bolero, Milland was offered a five-week guarantee by Benjamin Glazer to work on an upcoming screwball comedy starring Bing Crosby and Carole Lombard entitled We're Not Dressing (also 1934). During filming, he appeared in a scene with George Burns and Gracie Allen, which Milland recalls as falling into an "ad-libbed shambles" that he felt was better than the original script. The film's director Norman Taurog was so impressed, he rang the chief production executive and suggested that Milland be placed on a long-term contract. After a short meeting, Milland was offered a seven-year deal with Paramount starting at $175 a week. The contract gave Milland a secure income, enabling him with Muriel to move into an apartment on Fountain Avenue.

Milland later said "It all happened by luck and I was just there at the right place at the right time."

=== Paramount and The Jungle Princess ===
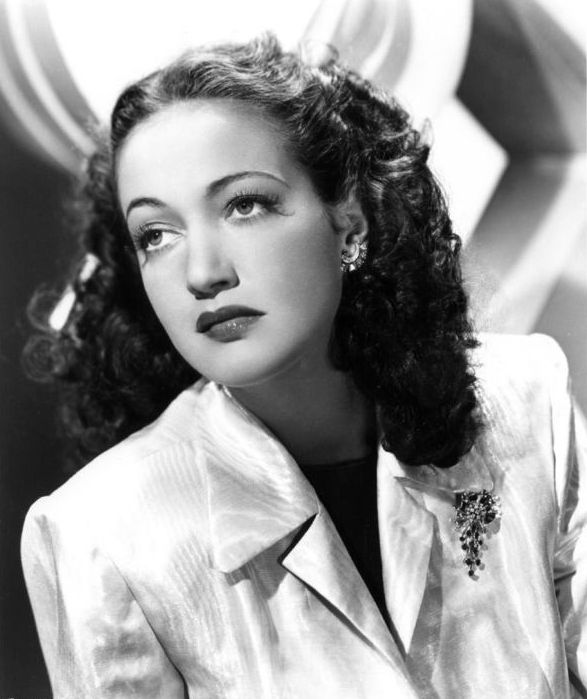
Dorothy Lamour, Milland's leading lady in The Jungle Princess (1936)

During his first contract with Paramount, Milland was used as part of the speaking cast, but never as a top-of-the-bill actor. He had a supporting role, for instance, in the original The Glass Key (1935) with George Raft.

Milland was lent to Universal for Next Time We Love (1936), with Margaret Sullavan and James Stewart. Back at Paramount he was in The Return of Sophie Lang (1936) and The Big Broadcast of 1937 (1936).

He was contacted by Joe Pasternak, who was looking for an 'English' actor for the lead in his new picture, Three Smart Girls (1936). Although Pasternak worked for Universal Studios, Paramount had agreed to lend Milland out for the film.

On returning to Paramount after Three Smart Girls was wrapped, Milland was used as a test actor to find a new starlet for The Jungle Princess (1936). When the studio chose Dorothy Lamour for the lead, Milland wrote in his autobiography that Lamour was confused to find that he was not to be her male lead and she requested Milland to be her co-star. Paramount was not keen, but when Three Smart Girls was pre-released to rave reviews, they gave Milland the role. By the end of 1936, Milland was being considered for leading roles, and Paramount rewrote his contract, resulting in the tripling of his salary.

=== As leading man 1937–1939 ===
After taking a break in Europe, Milland was cast as Captain Hugh "Bulldog" Drummond in Bulldog Drummond Escapes (1937).

Milland was then in Wings over Honolulu (1937) with Wendy Barrie, and then in Easy Living (1937), a classic comedy with Jean Arthur directed by Mitchell Leisen.

Milland did Ebb Tide (1937) with Frances Farmer and was then loaned to RKO for Wise Girl (1937) with Miriam Hopkins.

Back at Paramount, Milland was reunited with Lamour in Her Jungle Love (1938) and Tropic Holiday (1938). He then did a military drama for William Wellman, Men with Wings (1938), co-starring Fred MacMurray.

Milland did a comedy, Say It in French (1938), and then Hotel Imperial (1939) with Marlene Dietrich, during the production of which Milland suffered a near-fatal accident on the set. One scene called for him to lead a cavalry charge through a small village. An accomplished horseman, Milland insisted upon doing this scene himself. As he was making a scripted jump on the horse, his saddle came loose, sending him flying straight into a pile of broken masonry. Milland awoke in hospital, where he remained for a week with a badly damaged left hand, a three-inch gash to his head, and a concussion.

After recovering, he appeared as John Geste in Beau Geste (1939), alongside Gary Cooper and Robert Preston and directed by Wellman. The film was a huge hit. 20th Century Fox then borrowed him for Everything Happens at Night (1939) opposite Sonja Henie.

According to Milland, a second injury to his left hand occurred in 1939. As well as horse-riding, Milland enjoyed piloting aircraft and in his early career would lease single-seater planes. As a contracted starring actor, Paramount had insisted he give up this hobby. Instead, Milland took up woodworking and outfitted a machine shop at the back of his newly built house. While operating a circular saw, he slipped, catching one of his hands on the saw. The injury resulted in Milland losing a part of his thumb and severely damaging his tendons.

Milland believed that the injury left him with only 50% usage of his hand, but within weeks of the incident, he flew to Britain to star in French Without Tears. By the time he returned to America, war was declared in Europe. The year finished with the news that Muriel was pregnant with their son Daniel.

=== World War II ===
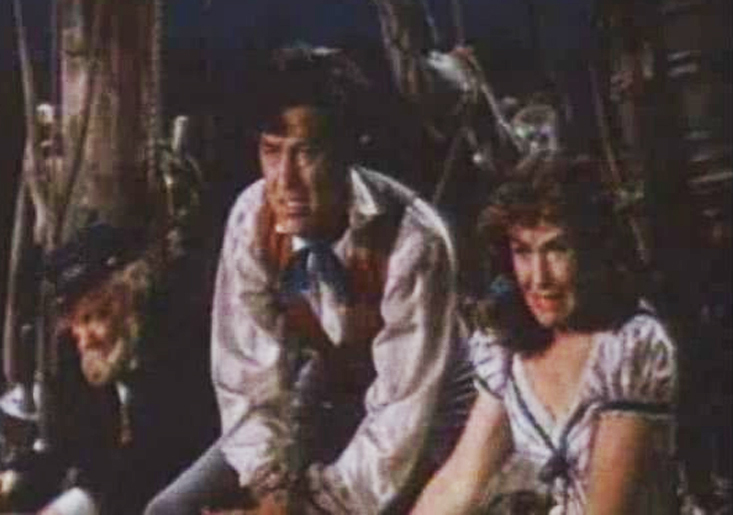
Milland with Paulette Goddard in Reap the Wild Wind (1942)

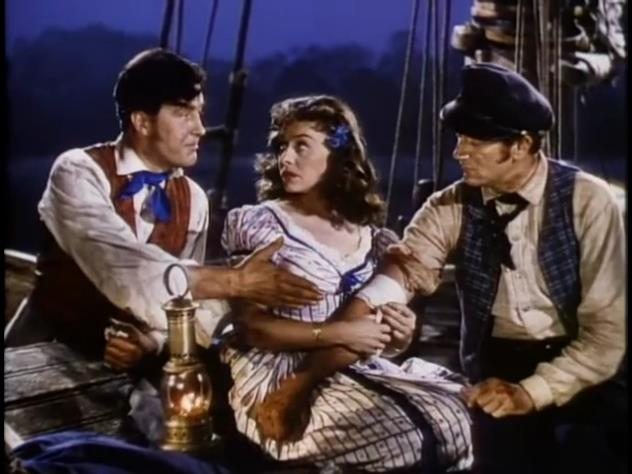
Milland, Paulette Goddard and John Wayne in Reap the Wild Wind

In 1940, Milland appeared in a selection of romantic comedies and dramas alongside some of the leading ladies of the time. These included Irene opposite Anna Neagle, The Doctor Takes a Wife opposite Loretta Young at Columbia, Arise, My Love opposite Claudette Colbert, and Untamed opposite Patricia Morison. He was a last minute replacement for Joel McCrea on Arise which meant he had to drop out of another film, Virginia.

When the United States entered World War II, Milland tried to enlist in the U.S. Army Air Forces, but was rejected because of his impaired left hand. He worked as a civilian flight instructor for the Army, and toured with a United Service Organisation South Pacific troupe in 1944.

As the Second World War continued, Milland found himself now appearing in more action pictures. He starred as a wannabe pilot in I Wanted Wings (1941) with Brian Donlevy, Veronica Lake and William Holden. This was followed by Skylark (1942) with Claudette Colbert, and two films with Paulette Goddard: The Lady Has Plans (1942) and Cecil B. DeMille's Reap the Wild Wind (1942) alongside John Wayne, in which he was top billed above Wayne.

Milland starred in Are Husbands Necessary? (1942) and subsequently Billy Wilder's directorial debut, The Major and the Minor (1942) opposite Ginger Rogers.

Milland appeared in the all-star musical Star Spangled Rhythm (1943), in which he appeared as himself, singing "If Men Played Cards as Women Do", alongside Fred MacMurray, Franchot Tone and Lynne Overman. He also made an appearance in the collaborative drama, Forever and a Day (1943).

He and Goddard then made The Crystal Ball (1943); thereafter, he was Ginger Rogers' leading man in Lady in the Dark (1944).

In 1944, Milland starred in the supernatural horror film, The Uninvited, which was notable for its serious treatment of ghosts and haunting main theme, and for making a star of Gail Russell. He then starred in Fritz Lang's film noir production of Graham Greene's Ministry of Fear (also 1944).

He also toured war theatres with USO Shows. At one performance a soldier heckled him, asking why he was not in the army. Milland replied, "With a war on? Are you crazy?"

=== The Lost Weekend, 1945 ===
The pinnacle of Milland's career and acknowledgment of his serious dramatic abilities came when he starred in The Lost Weekend (1945). Milland recalled how after returning from an emcee engagement in Peru, he found a book delivered to his home, with a note from Paramount's head of production Buddy DeSylva that read, "Read it. Study it. You're going to play it." Milland found the book unsettling and felt its subject matter, that of an alcoholic writer, to be challenging and alien to him. He was also concerned that it would require 'serious acting', something that he believed he had not undertaken up to that point in his career. The film was to be produced by Charles Brackett and directed by Billy Wilder; the pair were also collaborating to write the screenplay. Milland had already worked with both men, having starred in the comedy The Major and the Minor (1942), and he was excited by their involvement.

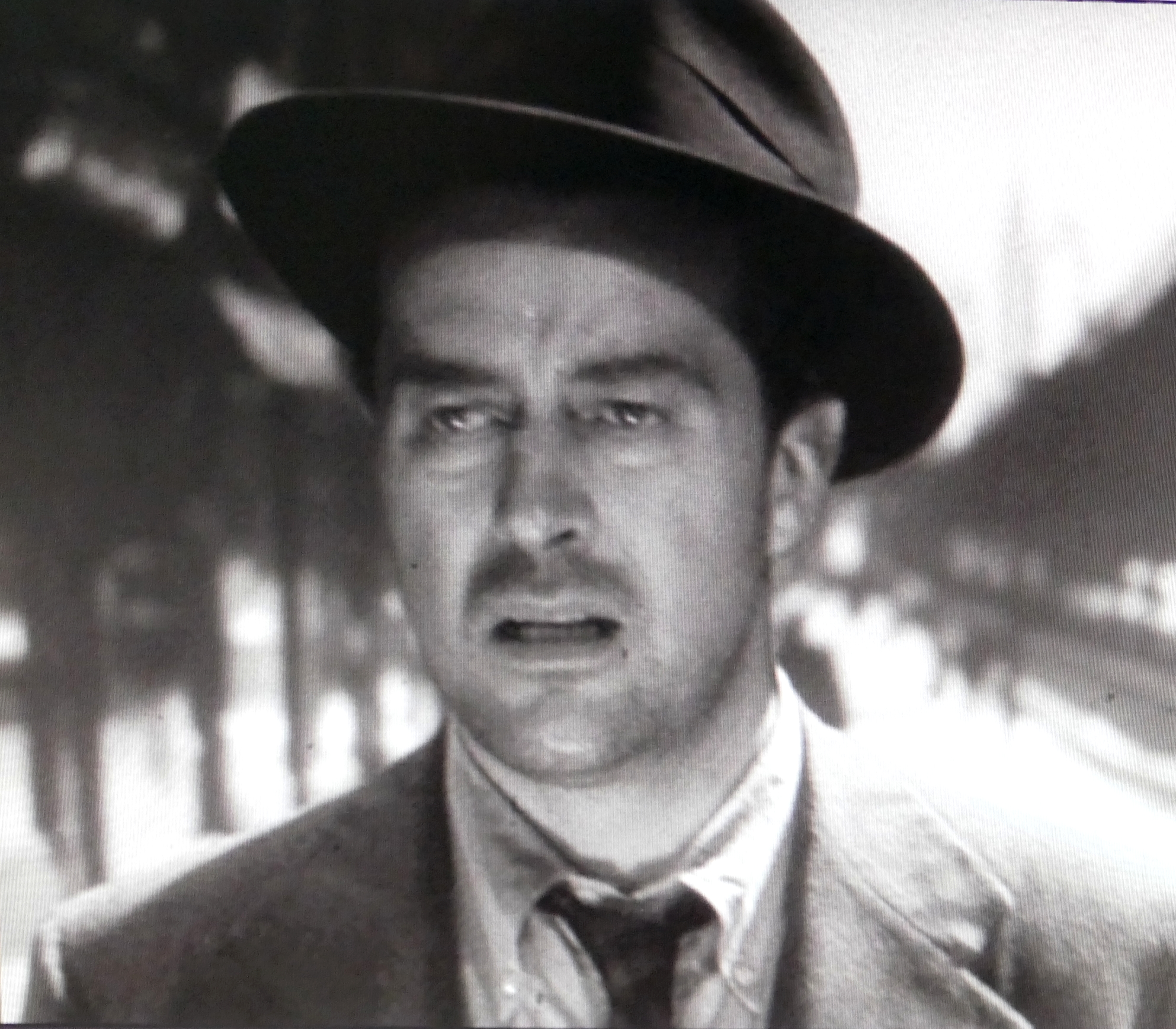
Milland in character as Don Birnam in The Lost Weekend (1945)

Milland's main concern with taking on the role of Don Birnam in The Lost Weekend was that he might overact and look amateurish. After a shambolic attempt to act parts of the script while actually drunk, Milland quickly realized that he needed to understand alcoholism. After the cast and crew had arrived on location in New York, Milland was allowed to spend a night in a psychiatric ward of Bellevue Hospital, where the patients were suffering from alcoholism and delirium tremens. He found the experience extremely disturbing and left at three in the morning. Milland lost eight pounds for the role and spoke with the book's author, Charles R. Jackson, to gain insight into the illness. After the external shots in New York were complete, in which hidden cameras were used to capture Milland walking the streets, the crew returned to Hollywood. Milland found the set work far more challenging, knowing that the close-ups would give his acting no place to hide. Between the strain of acting and the morbidity of the subject, Milland's home life deteriorated and he left for two weeks. When the shoot was over, he and Muriel left for a vacation in Canada. He later said that his role in The Lost Weekend "was the only part [he was] really proud of."

Returning to filming, Milland was assigned to a Mitchell Leisen-directed historical drama called Kitty (1945), opposite Paulette Goddard. He was meant to follow it with Olympia.

Instead, he did a romantic comedy, The Well-Groomed Bride opposite Olivia de Havilland. Many of the crew members on The Well-Groomed Bride had also worked on The Lost Weekend, and Milland recalled an encounter with a sound mixer, who told him that he had seen a rough cut of Weekend and thought Milland was not only sure to be nominated for an Academy Award but that he would probably win. Milland had not considered himself worthy of an award, but over the next few months, he thought of little else and was desperate to be nominated. After the first preview, reaction was mixed, but Brackett stated that they had produced "something really worthwhile". Milland found the initial feedback to his role congratulatory but hushed, leading him to feel that the film would bomb as a piece of cinema and would be seen as a social document. When the film was released in New York, the favourable reviews took both Milland and the studio by surprise. Milland was lauded, and he won not only that year's Academy Award for Best Actor but the Golden Globe Award for Best Actor–Drama, the Cannes Film Festival Award for Best Actor, the National Board of Review Award for Best Actor, and the New York Film Critics Circle Award for Best Actor. He was the first Welsh actor to win an Oscar, and when he collected the award from Ingrid Bergman, he gave one of the shortest acceptance speeches of any Oscar winner. His performance was so convincing, Milland was beleaguered for years by rumours that he actually was an alcoholic. He steadfastly asserted that he was not.

Milland's success in The Lost Weekend resulted in his contract being rewritten, and he became Paramount's highest-salaried actor. When the film was premiered across Europe, he was sent to attend each opening. When he appeared in Cardiff, the capital city of Wales, he was given the keys to the city.

=== 1945–1950 ===
Milland continued working as a leading man after his Oscar win, and stayed contracted to Paramount until the early 1950s. He was teamed with Teresa Wright in The Imperfect Lady (1946), directed by Lewis Allen. He replaced Alan Ladd in a Western with Barbara Stanwyck, California (1947), directed by John Farrow, which was a big hit.

Milland was reunited with Wright in The Trouble with Women (1947) and then starred opposite Marlene Dietrich in Golden Earrings (1947). He was one of many Paramount stars who made a cameo in Variety Girl (1947) then went to England to make So Evil My Love (1948), produced by Hal Wallis for director Lewis Allen.

Milland made a second film for Farrow, The Big Clock (1948), which has become one of his most highly regarded films. He then did his third film with Allen, Sealed Verdict (1948), and a third with Farrow, Alias Nick Beal (1949), which Milland later said was his favourite film.

In July 1948, Paramount suspended him for refusing a part in The Mark of Lucretia (which became The Bride of Vengeance). Milland commented, "it is a part that is out of my normal natural range as an actor."

Milland then went to Fox for the comedy, It Happens Every Spring (1949), and then made a fourth film with Farrow, Copper Canyon (1950). After this, Milland increasingly freelanced.

=== Other studios ===
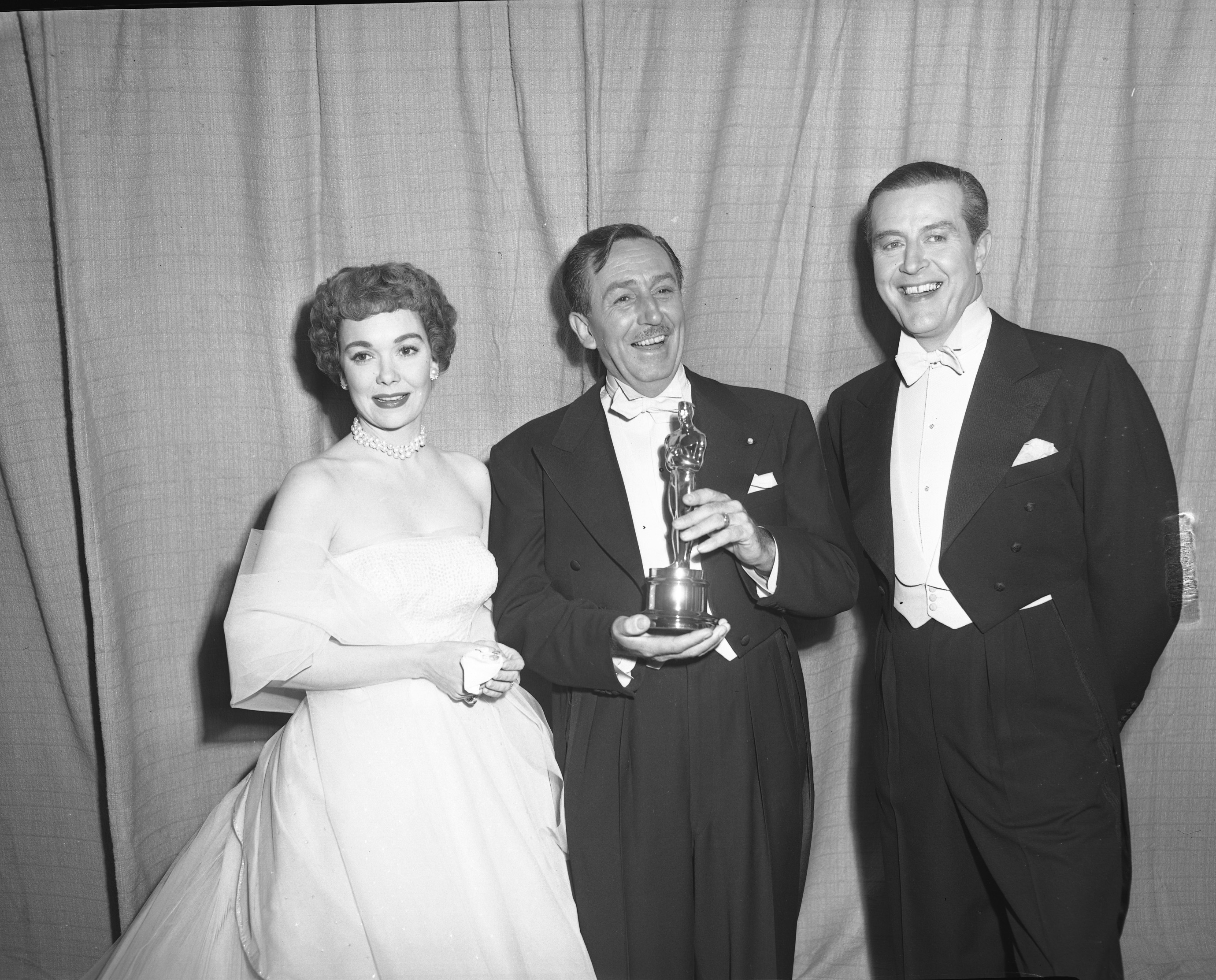
Jane Wyman, Walt Disney and Milland at 1953 Oscars

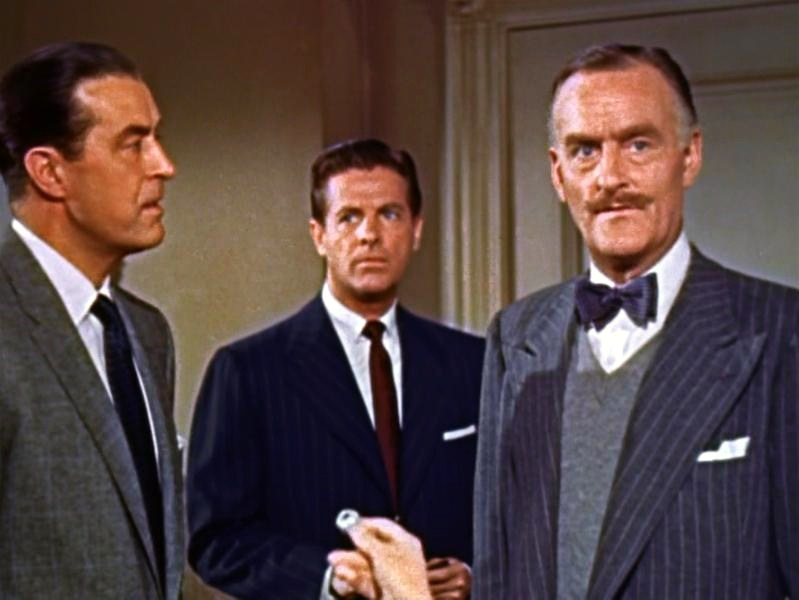
Milland, Robert Cummings and John Williams in Dial M for Murder (1954)

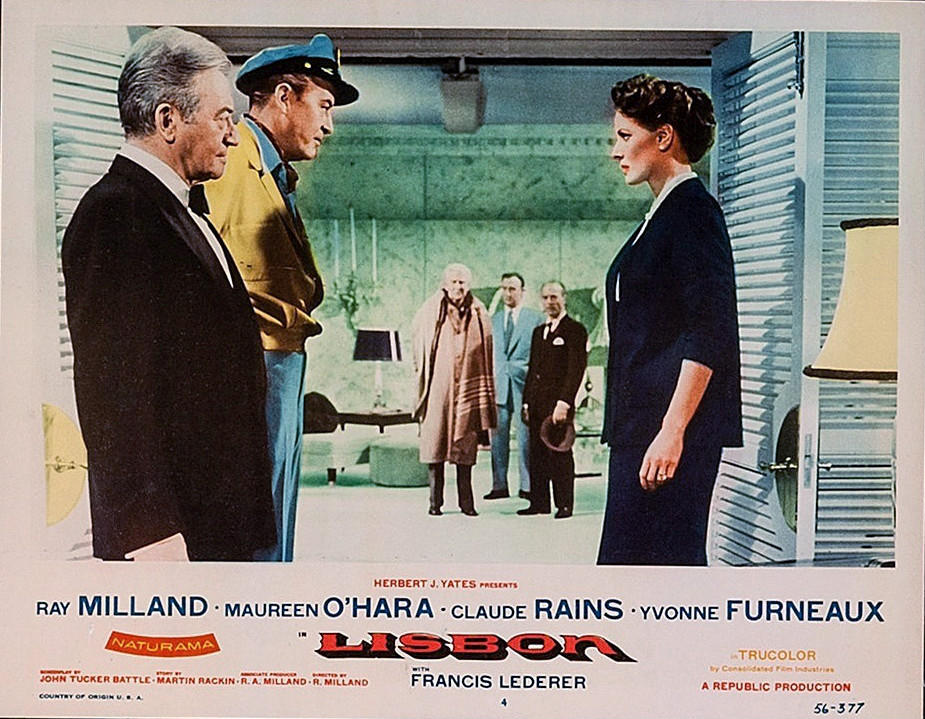
Lobby card for Lisbon (1956) with Claude Rains, Milland and Maureen O'Hara

At Columbia, Milland starred opposite Rosalind Russell in A Woman of Distinction (1950). Then, at MGM, he was directed by George Cukor in A Life of Her Own (1950) alongside Lana Turner, replacing Wendell Corey, who had quit the film just three days into filming.

Milland was directed by Jacques Tourneur in RKO's Circle of Danger (1951); set in the United Kingdom, it was the only time he filmed in his home country of Wales. At MGM he was in Night Into Morning (1951) and then a comedy, Rhubarb (1951).

Milland gave a strong performance in Close to My Heart (1951) at Warner Bros, in which he and Gene Tierney starred as a couple trying to adopt a child. His next film, Bugles in the Afternoon (1952), also at Warners, was a Western. He played in Something to Live For (1952), another study of alcoholism at Paramount, with Joan Fontaine.

Milland had a contract to make one film a year with Paramount (who released Pine-Thomas films). He was wanted by producer Harold Popkin to make The Thief but Paramount insisted he make Jamaica Run under their contract instead. The impasse was resolved by the intervention of Milland's agents at MCA and filming for Jamaica Run was pushed back. For The Thief (1952), his role was without dialogue, and he was nominated for a second Golden Globe. He later remarked that he was proud of the film.

After Jamaica Run (1953), Milland went to Columbia for Let's Do It Again (1953) with Jane Wyman.

He then starred opposite Grace Kelly and Robert Cummings in Alfred Hitchcock's Dial M for Murder (1954), originally shot in three dimensions. Although never admitted by either, rumours were rife at the time that Kelly and Milland were engaged in an affair, fuelled by notorious gossip columnist Hedda Hopper.

He starred with Phyllis Avery and Lloyd Corrigan in the CBS sitcom, Meet Mr. McNutley, from 1953 to 1955. He appeared in the role of an English and Drama professor at the fictitious Lynnhaven College. The sitcom was renamed The Ray Milland Show in its second season. Milland directed some episodes, and he soon had ambitions to direct features.

At Fox, Milland starred in The Girl in the Red Velvet Swing (1955). then starred in a TV adaptation of Markheim (1956) directed by Fred Zinnemann.

=== Directing ===
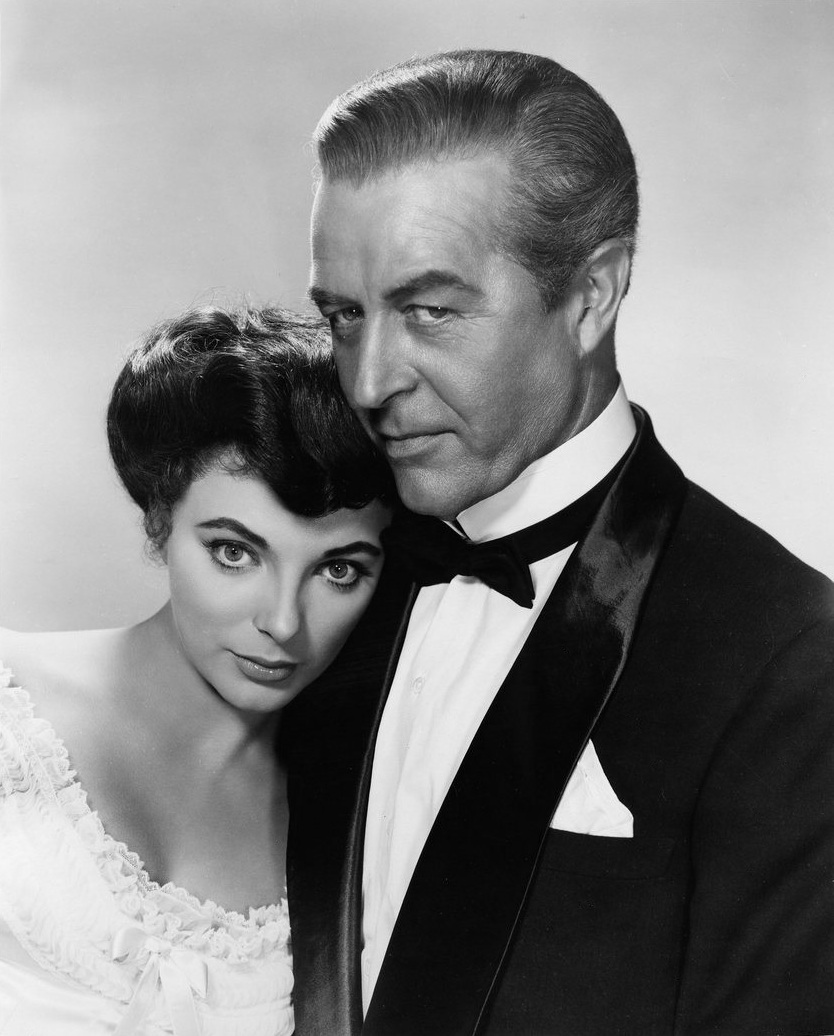
Joan Collins and Milland in The Girl in the Red Velvet Swing (1955)

After leaving Paramount, Milland concentrated on directing. In his first directorial effort, a Western entitled A Man Alone (1955), Milland cast himself in the leading role. His co-stars included Mary Murphy and Ward Bond. The story depicts the aftermath of a stagecoach robbery. He did the film for a lesser fee in exchange for a chance to direct and a percentage of the profits

He then starred in and directed Lisbon (1956), alongside Maureen O'Hara and Claude Rains. Like A Man Alone, it was distributed by Republic Pictures and filmed in Trucolor.

He directed episodes of The Ford Television Theatre and Schlitz Playhouse and starred in the features Three Brave Men (1956), The River's Edge (1957), a Western directed by Allan Dwan for Benedict Bogeaus, and High Flight (1957), an air force melodrama for Warwick Pictures in England.

He appeared in episodes of Suspicion and General Electric Theater, directing episodes of both. His third feature as director was The Safecracker (1958), which was shot in England.

=== Retirement and Markham ===
Milland then retired for six months before deciding to go back to work, commenting, "my wife told me I'd better get a job of some kind because I was making her a nervous wreck ... hanging around the house."

From 1958 to 1960, Milland starred in the CBS detective series, Markham, originally called Crisis.

During the making of the show Milland remarked, "it's becoming more and more of an effort to go on acting. I know it's a wonderful way to make a living but any job you don't like becomes difficult and I just don't like acting. I never have. I do it because I can't make a living any other way. Standing in front of a crew playing love scenes embarasses me. I'm as self conscious as hell and I want to get it over with. You get up too early and you finish too late and you feel like a lackey."

The show failed to capture the expected significant audience, even though it followed the western Gunsmoke.

Do what you can with what you've got. I know actors from my generation who sit at home and cry, 'Why don't they send me any scripts?' I tell them, 'Because you still think of yourself as a leading man. You're 68, not 28. Face it.'

— Milland explaining his philosophy on becoming a character actor towards the end of his career

He retired again, this time to the French Riviera in 1960. However, he soon became bored and started acting again.

=== AIP ===
Milland appeared in two Roger Corman AIP pictures. The first was The Premature Burial (1962)—the third of Corman's 'Poe Cycle'. He then portrayed Dr. Xavier in the well-received X: The Man with the X-ray Eyes (1963).

Also for AIP, he starred in the self-directed, apocalyptic science-fiction drama, Panic in Year Zero! (1962).

He continued to guest star on shows like The Alfred Hitchcock Hour, and he appeared in Quick, Let's Get Married (1964).

=== Broadway ===
Milland decided to return to the stage and in 1964 appeared as Higgins in a touring version of My Fair Lady, with mezzo-soprano Marilyn Savage as Eliza Doolittle. He enjoyed the experience and in 1966 took the lead role as Simon Crawford QC in the Broadway play, Hostile Witness, directed by Reginald Denham.

The play ran in New York from February until July of that year, after which Milland took the play on the road. In 1968, he reprised the role in a film of the same title, which he also directed. It was the last feature film he directed.

=== Character actor ===
He returned as a character actor in the late 1960s and the 1970s, appearing in such films as Daughter of the Mind (1969), a television film that reunited him with Gene Tierney.

In the late 1960s, Milland hosted rebroadcasts of certain episodes of the syndicated Western anthology series, Death Valley Days, under the title Trails West; the series' original host had been Ronald Reagan. He also guest-starred on Bracken's World and The Name of the Game as well as in TV movies like Company of Killers (1970), River of Gold (1971) and Black Noon (1971).

Milland had his biggest box office success in many years when he played Oliver Barrett III in Love Story (1970). In 1978 Milland reprised his role as Oliver Barrett III in Oliver's Story, also written by Erich Segal.

He was then in Embassy (1972), a British spy thriller.

In 1970, he said he worked only two to three months a year acting and spent the rest of the year relaxing, although he admitted that he had suffered some financial troubles since the sale of his yacht in 1964.

=== Horror and action movies; focus on television ===
In 1972, Milland starred in two horror films. One was Frogs, co-starring Sam Elliott and Joan Van Ark, in which Milland played a wealthy, cantankerous plantation owner who dumps waste materials in a swamp, causing an enormous disruption of nature. The second, The Thing with Two Heads, a blaxploitation film directed by Lee Frost, is considered a cult classic; Milland plays a brain surgeon with a terminal illness who transplants his head onto the healthy body of an African-American prisoner. The following year he was in The House in Nightmare Park (1973), a comedy chiller, and had the lead in the TV movie, Terror in the Wax Museum (1973).

He also turned in an appearance as a hand surgeon in the Night Gallery episode, "The Hand of Borgus Weems". He guest-starred in two episodes of Columbo, as a grieving widower in "Death Lends a Hand" (1971) and as a suspect in "The Greenhouse Jungle" (1972).

Milland was in such action films as The Big Game (1974), The Student Connection (1974) and Gold opposite Roger Moore (1974). Then he did another TV horror film, The Dead Don't Die (1975). He appeared in Escape to Witch Mountain (1975) for Disney and guest starred on shows like Cool Million and Ellery Queen.

Around this time, Milland said that he planned on moving to Europe and that he accepted "the parts I figure I can get some enjoyment out of."

In 1975, Milland was the subject of an episode of the British biographical TV series, This Is Your Life.

Milland had a significant success with the TV miniseries, Rich Man, Poor Man (1976), receiving an Emmy nomination for Best Supporting Actor.

He also had roles in The Swiss Conspiracy (1976), Aces High (1976), Look What's Happened to Rosemary's Baby (1976), Mayday at 40,000 Feet! (1976), The Last Tycoon (1976), Seventh Avenue (1976), Oil (1977), Testimony of Two Men (1977), The Uncanny (1977), Slavers (1977) and The Pyjama Girl Case (1978), an Italian giallo set in Australia.

He starred in Cruise Into Terror (1978), The Hardy Boys/Nancy Drew Mysteries, Blackout (1978) and The Darker Side of Terror (1979).

He guest-starred as Sire Uri in Saga of a Star World (1978), the pilot episode of the original Battlestar Galactica television series. He reprised his role as Ryan O'Neal's father in Oliver's Story (1978) and appeared in some action films, including Spree (1979) and Game for Vultures (1979).

Milland guest-starred on several Aaron Spelling-produced shows such as Fantasy Island, The Love Boat, Charlie's Angels and Hart to Hart. In the latter, he appeared twice as Jennifer Hart's father.

He was top billed in The Attic (1980), but usually had supporting roles in TV movies like The Dream Merchants (1980), Our Family Business (1981), The Royal Romance of Charles and Diana (1982), Starflight: The Plane That Couldn't Land (1983), Cave In! (1983) and The Masks of Death (1984), a Sherlock Holmes adventure starring Peter Cushing and John Mills.

His last appearances were in The Sea Serpent (1985) and The Gold Key (1985). The latter was a mystery made specifically for video.

== Personal life ==
Milland was married to Muriel Frances Weber (31 December 1908 – 6 October 1992) from 30 September 1932 until his death on 10 March 1986. They had one biological son and one adopted daughter. Their son, Daniel, appeared in several minor acting roles in the 1960s and died of an apparent suicide in March 1981, at the age of 41.

Milland became a naturalised American citizen in the 1940s. He supported the Republican Party and publicly backed Thomas E. Dewey in the 1944 United States presidential election as well as Richard Nixon in the 1968 presidential election.

=== Death ===
Milland died of lung cancer at the Torrance Memorial Medical Center in Torrance, California, on 10 March 1986. He was 79 years old. In line with his instructions, no funeral was held. His body was cremated, and his ashes were scattered into the Pacific Ocean off the coast of Redondo Beach, California.

== Awards and honors ==
Institution	Year	Category	Work	Result	Ref.
Academy Awards	1946	Best Actor	The Lost Weekend	Won	
Cannes Film Festival	1946	Best Actor	The Lost Weekend	Won	
Golden Globe Awards	1946	Best Actor in a Motion Picture – Drama	The Lost Weekend	Won	
Golden Globe Awards	1953	Best Actor in a Motion Picture – Drama	The Thief	Nominated	
National Board of Review	1945	Best Actor	The Lost Weekend	Won	
New York Film Critics Circle	1945	Best Actor	The Lost Weekend	Won	
Primetime Emmy Awards	1976	Outstanding Supporting Actor in a Drama Series	Rich Man, Poor Man	Nominated	

Additionally, Milland received two stars on the Hollywood Walk of Fame (one for Motion Pictures and one for Television) on 8 February 1960. They are at 1621 Vine Street and 1634 Vine Street, respectively.

== Bibliography ==
- Berry, David (1996). Wales and Cinema, The First Hundred Years. Cardiff: University of Wales Press. p. 215. ISBN 0-7083-1370-1.
- Milland, Ray (1974). Wide-Eyed in Babylon. New York: Morrow. ISBN 0-688-00257-9.
- Parkinson, David (2011). "Ray Milland". Oxford Dictionary of National Biography (online ed.). Oxford University Press. doi:10.1093/ref:odnb/57315. (Subscription, Wikipedia Library access or UK public library membership required.)
