= The Attic (1980 film) =

- Theatrical poster
- Directed by: George Edwards
- Written by: Tony Crechales; George Edwards; Mel Edelstein
- Produced by: Ray Dryden; Robert H. Becker
- Starring: Carrie Snodgress; Ray Milland; Ruth Cox; Frances Bay; Rosemary Murphy
- Cinematography: Gary Graver
- Edited by: Derek Parsons
- Music by: Hod David Schudson
- Production companies: Forum Productions; Attic Associates
- Distributed by: Atlantic Releasing Corporation
- Release date: October 6, 1980
- Running time: 101 minutes
- Country: United States
- Language: English

The Attic is a 1980 American psychological horror drama film directed by George Edwards and starring Carrie Snodgress and Ray Milland.

== Plot ==
Louise Elmore is a depressed, alcoholic spinster who works as a head librarian in Wichita, Kansas. Since her fiancé, Robert, disappeared the day before their wedding nineteen years ago, Louise has devoted herself to caring for her infirm, abusive father Wendell, who uses a wheelchair. After suffering a nervous breakdown and starting a fire inside the library, Louise resigns from her position, and begins training her younger incoming replacement, Emily Perkins. Following the fire, Louise attempted suicide by slashing her wrists, but survived. Louise and Emily quickly become friends, and Emily shows empathy toward Louise. At home, Louise continually has fantasies about taking revenge against her father, sometimes going so far as murdering him.

One night, Louise goes to the movie theater alone, where she meets Richard, a sailor. After the movie, Louise returns to his hotel with him, and the two have sex. The next day, Louise and Emily spend the morning shopping together. After noticing that Louise expresses affection for a chimpanzee in a pet store window, Emily covertly goes into the store and purchases the animal as a gift. Louise brings the chimpanzee home much to Wendell's reluctance, and names him Dickie. Emily confides in Louise about her boyfriend, who recently relocated to California, and who wants her to join him there; Emily is reluctant to leave Kansas, but Louise insists that she should, citing the state of her own life as evidence.

Emily invites Louise to have dinner with her at her mother's house, which Louise obliges. The dinner goes awkwardly as the demure Mrs. Perkins chastises Emily's younger brother for his manners. Louise responds by breaking one of Mrs. Perkins' cherished figurines, feigning an accident. The next evening, Emily and the other library staff hold a small party for Louise to send her off. When Louise returns home, she finds Dickie is missing, and her father claims the chimpanzee ran away. Louise grows distraught. The next morning, Louise purchases a plane ticket to Los Angeles for Emily, and mails it to her at the library with a note. Emily decides to seize the opportunity and immediately goes to the airport, where she calls Louise from a payphone to thank her.

The next day, Louise brings her father to the local park. While wheeling him up a hill, the wheelchair tips over, and Wendell falls out. Louise observes as he reflexively picks himself up, revealing that he is in fact not disabled—Louise realizes that he has feigned his disability to enslave her to him. In a fit of rage, Louise pushes Wendell down the hill, inadvertently killing him when he smashes his head against a rock. Louise flees back home to gather her belongings, and searches the house for her father's hidden cache of money, intending to run away. While searching her father's belongings, Louise comes across a key to the home's attic, which has long been locked and boarded. Using the key, Louise enters the attic, and inadvertently locks herself inside. There, she finds Dickie's body, along with the long-decomposed remains of Robert, both murdered by her father.

== Cast ==
- Carrie Snodgress as Louise Elmore
- Ray Milland as Wendell
- Ruth Cox as Emily Perkins
- Rosemary Murphy as Mrs. Perkins
- Frances Bay as Librarian
- ANGEL as Dickie The Chimpanzee
- Phil Speary as Travel Agency Clerk
- Dick Welsbacher as Missing Persons Bureau Officer
- Fern Barry as Mrs.Mooney
- Michael Rhodes as Sailor In Movie Theatre

== Reception ==
Critical reception for The Attic has been mixed. TV Guide awarded the film 2 / 4 stars calling it "A fair psychological thriller".

== Release ==
The film was released on VHS in October 1985 by CBS/Fox Video on its "Key Video" logo and on DVD by MGM on August 27, 2002, as a double feature with Crawlspace.
