= Close to My Heart =

1951 film by William Keighley

- Directed by: William Keighley
- Screenplay by: James R. Webb
- Based on: Baby for Midge; 1950 story in Good Housekeeping by James R. Webb
- Produced by: William Jacobs
- Starring: Gene Tierney; Ray Milland
- Cinematography: Robert Burks
- Edited by: Clarence Kolster
- Music by: Max Steiner
- Production company: Warner Bros. Pictures
- Distributed by: Warner Bros. Pictures
- Release date: November 1, 1950 (Los Angeles)
- Running time: 90 minutes
- Country: United States
- Language: English

Close to My Heart is a 1951 American drama film directed by William Keighley, written by James R. Webb (based on his novel A Baby for Midge) and starring Ray Milland and Gene Tierney.

== Plot ==
Newspaper columnist Brad Sheridan and wife Midge cannot have children of their own, so they decide to adopt a child. The adoption agency tells Midge that the waiting list is long, but she learns of an abandoned child left at the police station. The police tell Midge that the child, a boy named Danny, is a ward of the juvenile court. Brad and Midge meet Danny, but Brad thinks that they will be unlikely to adopt Danny if he is placed with the adoption agency and subjected to the long wait. Midge continues to visit Danny and becomes attached. Brad, not wanting to become too emotionally involved, writes a column about Danny's abandonment, angering Midge. Mrs. Morrow from the agency inspects the Sheridans' home but warns them that adopting Danny is risky, as his background is unknown. Danny is not wanted by other prospective adoptive parents because he is a foundling, which clears a path for the Sheridans to adopt him. Brad is told of how a well-known local couple adopted a son without knowledge of the boy's disreputable background, and the son became a criminal.

Brad's investigation leads him to a woman named Arlene who tells Brad that Danny's mother, named Martha, died during childbirth. Arlene lied to authorities that the child's father took the baby, but she took the child herself. She gives Brad a ring belonging to Martha. Without Midge's knowledge, Brad investigates Martha's history. The operator of a boarding house where Martha stayed gives Brad a sweater that had belonged to Martha. Brad tells Midge of his efforts to investigate Danny's background. Mrs. Morrow warns Midge that the adoption may not proceed until Brad stops his investigation.

Brad discovers that Martha was a reputable schoolteacher who was involved with Edward Hewitt. Brad suspects that Hewitt accompanied Martha to Reno to marry her and he publishes a photo of Hewitt. Mrs. Morrow recognizes Hewitt's photo, informs Midge that Hewitt is incarcerated for murder, and tells her that the adoption cannot proceed.

At San Quentin State Prison. Brad tells Hewitt that he has a son and that Martha died during childbirth. Hewitt is embittered and replies that there was no place in his life for a child. Brad returns home and learns that the agency took Danny in order to protect him from Brad. He rushes to retrieve Danny but is stopped by the court's probation officer. Brad convinces Mrs. Morrow to approve the adoption by describing how a meeting with Hewitt's brother convinced him that nurturing a child is more important than the nature of the child's background.

== Cast ==
- Ray Milland as Brad Sheridan
- Gene Tierney as Midge Sheridan
- Fay Bainter as Mrs. Morrow
- Howard St. John as E.O. Frost
- Mary Beth Hughes as Arlene
- Ann Morrison as Mrs. Barker
- James Seay as Everett C. Heilner / Edward C. Hewitt
- Baby John Winslow as Danny
- Gertrude Hoffman as Mrs.Madison (uncredited)
- Eddie Marr as Tipster Cab Driver (uncredited)
- Ralph Byrd as Charlie (uncredited)
- Luther Crockett as San Quentin Warden (uncredited)
- John Maxwell as Police Chemist (uncredited)
- Harlan Warde as Father in passing car (uncredited)

== Reception ==
Critic John L. Scott of the Los Angeles Times wrote: "One might call 'Close to My Heart' a soap-opera production, but it is a sincere one, well acted with restraint. At times the movie gets a little ponderous."

== Radio adaptation ==
Close to My Heart was presented on Lux Radio Theatre on March 2, 1953. The one-hour adaptation starred Ray Milland and Phyllis Thaxter.
