= The Lady from the Sea (1929 film) =

1929 film

- Directed by: Castleton Knight
- Written by: Joe Grossman; Victor Kendall; Garnett Weston
- Starring: Ray Milland; Mona Goya; Moore Marriott
- Cinematography: Jack E. Cox; James E. Rogers; Theodor Sparkuhl
- Edited by: A.C. Hammond
- Music by: John Reynders
- Production company: British International Pictures
- Distributed by: Paramount British Pictures (silent); Wardour Films (sound)
- Release date: May 1929
- Running time: 56 minutes
- Country: United Kingdom
- Language: English

The Lady from the Sea is a 1929 sound British romance film directed by Castleton Knight and starring Ray Milland, Mona Goya, and Moore Marriott. It was originally released as a silent in May 1929, before it was subsequently re-shot entirely in sound and re-released the following year. The sound version is still extant, while the original silent version is lost.

The film was also known as Goodwin Sands. The film was shot at Elstree Studios and originally released by Paramount British. The film's sets were designed by the art director J. Elder Wills.

== Plot ==
A fisherman working off the Goodwin Sands becomes romantically attached to an upper-class woman.

== Cast ==
- Mona Goya as Claire le Grange
- Ray Milland as Tom Roberts
- Moore Marriott as Old Roberts
- Bruce Gordon as Dick Roberts
- Eugenie Amami as Rose
- Anita Graham as Mrs. Roberts
- Wilfred Shine as Doctor

== Bibliography ==
- Low, Rachel. The History of British Film: Volume IV, 1918–1929. Routledge, 1997.
- McKay, James. Ray Milland: The Films, 1929-1984. McFarland, 2020.
- Wood, Linda. British Films, 1927-1939. British Film Institute, 1986.
