= The Jungle Princess =

1936 film by Wilhelm Thiele

- Film poster
- Directed by: Wilhelm Thiele (as William Thiele)
- Screenplay by: Cyril Hume; Gerald Geraghty; Gouverneur Morris
- Story by: Max Marcin
- Produced by: E. Lloyd Sheldon
- Starring: Dorothy Lamour; Ray Milland
- Cinematography: Harry Fischbeck
- Edited by: Ellsworth Hoagland
- Production company: Paramount Pictures
- Distributed by: Paramount Pictures
- Release date: November 27, 1936
- Running time: 85 minutes
- Country: United States
- Language: English
- Budget: $600,000 (estimate)

The Jungle Princess is a 1936 American adventure film directed by Wilhelm Thiele starring Dorothy Lamour and Ray Milland.

== Plot ==
A man named Christopher Powell is in a big game hunting camp in Malaya with his fiancée Ava and her father Colonel Lane, capturing wild animals. While out hunting he is attacked by a tiger, and Melan, his native guide, runs away, leaving Powell for dead. But the tiger, Limau, is the pet of Ulah, a young woman who grew up by herself in the jungle. She and Limau were once orphaned by each other's parents. She rescues Chris and takes him back to her cave, where she nurses him to health and falls in love with him. When he eventually returns to camp, she follows. Ava is jealous, and the natives see Ulah or Limau as demons; all of which leads to a lot of trouble.

The natives capture everyone from the camp. They prepare to execute Ulah by lowering her into a pit. Melan, a traitor, digs the pit. Limau dies trying to save her; the natives throw a volley of spears at him. Ulah weeps while watching Limau die. Karen Neg escapes first and tries to take on all of the locals with a broadsword, but pays for it with his life; Melan impales him from behind. Bogo, the chimpanzee, sees what happens, and rallies a horde of monkeys. Powell escapes, takes Ava's pistol from her pocket, and shoots Melan right before he can kill Ulah. As Powell unties Ullah, the hoard of monkeys arrives, and stampedes, destroying all of the natives' homes. (This mirrors the catastrophe in the movie's intro, when a herd of Indian elephants stampedes and destroys the village where Ulah spent her pre-orphan childhood.) Powell shoots one of the locals as the latter tries to kill Bogo. (This mirrors the moment, earlier in the movie, when Ulah's and Limau's parents killed each other.)

Later, Chris and Ava reconcile. She and the Colonel embrace one another happily. One last time, Chris and Ulah kiss. The movie ends with Bogo covering his face with his hand.

== Cast ==
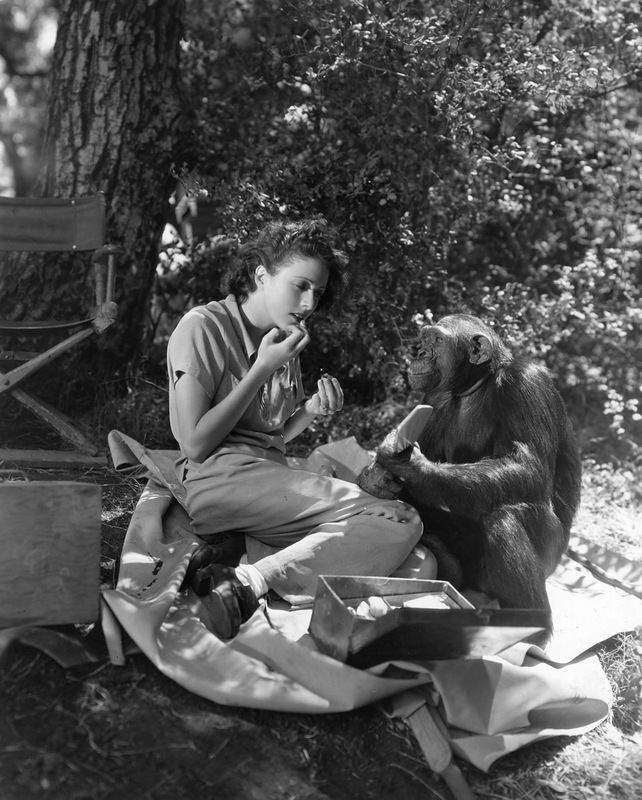
Molly Lamont on the set of The Jungle Princess

- Dorothy Lamour as Ulah
  - Sally Martin as child Ulah
- Ray Milland as Christopher Powell
- Akim Tamiroff as Karen Neg
- Lynne Overman as Frank
- Molly Lamont as Ava Lane
- Ray Mala as Melan (as Mala)
- Hugh Buckler as Col. Neville Lane
- Roberta Law as Lin
- Limau the tiger
- Bogo the ape

== Release ==
The film was initially banned in Nazi Germany, but Paramount requested the ban to be lifted in October 1937, and the censorship office lifted the ban in March 1938.

== Reception ==
Writing for The Spectator in 1937, Graham Greene gave the film a mildly positive review. He critiqued the film's hackneyed use of exaggerated social consciousness as a trope, but noted that "the climax is magnificent" and ultimately characterized it as a "lively picture".

The Jungle Princess was a major hit and launched Lamour's career as one of the leading stars of the era, often cast, sarong-clad, in similar jungle adventure romances, which led to her playing leading lady to Bing Crosby and Bob Hope in the Road to... musical comedy movie series beginning four years later.

The Indonesian film Terang Boelan (1937) was partially inspired by The Jungle Princess.

== Works cited ==
- Niven, Bill (2018). Hitler and Film: The Führer's Hidden Passion. Yale University Press. ISBN 9780300200362.
