= Castleton Knight =

British film producer and director (1894–1970)

Castleton Knight OBE
- Born: 9 August 1894; Bromley, Kent, United Kingdom
- Died: 3 April 1970 (aged 75); Battle, East Sussex; United Kingdom
- Other name: Leonard Castleton Knight
- Occupations: Film director, film producer

Castleton Knight, OBE (9 August 1894 – 3 April 1970) was a British film producer and director. He worked at one point as managing director of British Gaumont's newsreel division. He directed several feature films, but worked primarily in documentaries. He produced and directed the 1953 Technicolor documentary A Queen Is Crowned about the Coronation of Queen Elizabeth II.

== Selected filmography ==
=== Director ===
The Flying Scotsman (1929) by Castleton Knight

- The Plaything (1929)
- The Flying Scotsman (1929)
- The Lady from the Sea (1929)
- Kissing Cup's Race (1930)
- For Freedom (1940)

== Bibliography ==
- Monk, Claire & Sargeant, Amy. British Historical Cinema: The History, Heritage and Costume Film. Routledge, 2002.
