= The Plaything =

1929 film

- Directed by: Castleton Knight
- Written by: Arthur Jarvis Black (play); Violet E. Powell
- Starring: Estelle Brody; Heather Thatcher; Nigel Barrie; Marguerite Allan
- Cinematography: James E. Rogers
- Music by: Hubert Bath
- Production company: British International Pictures
- Distributed by: Wardour Films
- Release date: 30 September 1929
- Running time: 5,873 feet
- Country: United Kingdom
- Languages: Sound (Part-Talkie); English

The Plaything is a 1929 British part-talkie sound romance film directed by Castleton Knight and starring Estelle Brody, Heather Thatcher and Nigel Barrie. The film was a mixture of silent and sound film as it was released during the transition period following Blackmail. It was based on the play Life Is Pretty Much the Same by Arthur Jarvis Black. It was made by British International Pictures at Elstree Studios.

== Cast ==
- Estelle Brody as Joyce Bennett
- Heather Thatcher as Martyn Bennett
- Nigel Barrie as Wallace McKinnel
- Marguerite Allan as Madeleine McKinnel
- John St. John as Claude
- Ray Milland as Ian

== See also ==
- List of early sound feature films (1926–1929)

== Bibliography ==
- Low, Rachel. The History of British Film: Volume IV, 1918–1929. Routledge, 1997.
- Wood, Linda. British Films, 1927-1939. British Film Institute, 1986.
