= McBroom =

McBroom is a surname. Notable people with the surname include:

- Amanda McBroom (born 1947), American singer, songwriter and cabaret performer
- Austin McBroom (born 1992), American YouTuber (The Ace Family)
- David Bruce (actor) (born Marden Andrew McBroom; 1914–1976), American film actor
- Durga McBroom (born 1962), American rock singer
- Ed (Edward W.) McBroom (born 1981), American politician
- Edward McBroom (1925–1990), American politician
- Kelly McBroom (born 1989), Canadian skier
- Michael McBroom (born 1991), American swimmer
- Pearl McBroom (1926–2004), American cardiologist
- Ryan McBroom (born 1992), American professional baseball player
- Stephen McBroom (born 1964), Australian rules footballer
- Tom McBroom (born 1952), Canadian golf course architect
- Troy McBroom (born 1983), American football wide receiver

== See also ==
- Frances McBroom Thompson (1942–2014), American mathematics educator and textbook author
- John Keith McBroom Laird (1907–1985), author, barrister, and solicitor
- Shidler McBroom Gates and Lucas, a law firm which merged to form Preston Gates & Ellis
