= Von Zerneck =

von Zerneck is a surname. Notable people with the surname include:

- Danielle von Zerneck (born 1965), American actress and film producer
- Frank von Zerneck (born 1940), American television producer
