= Mary Elizabeth McDonough =

American actress

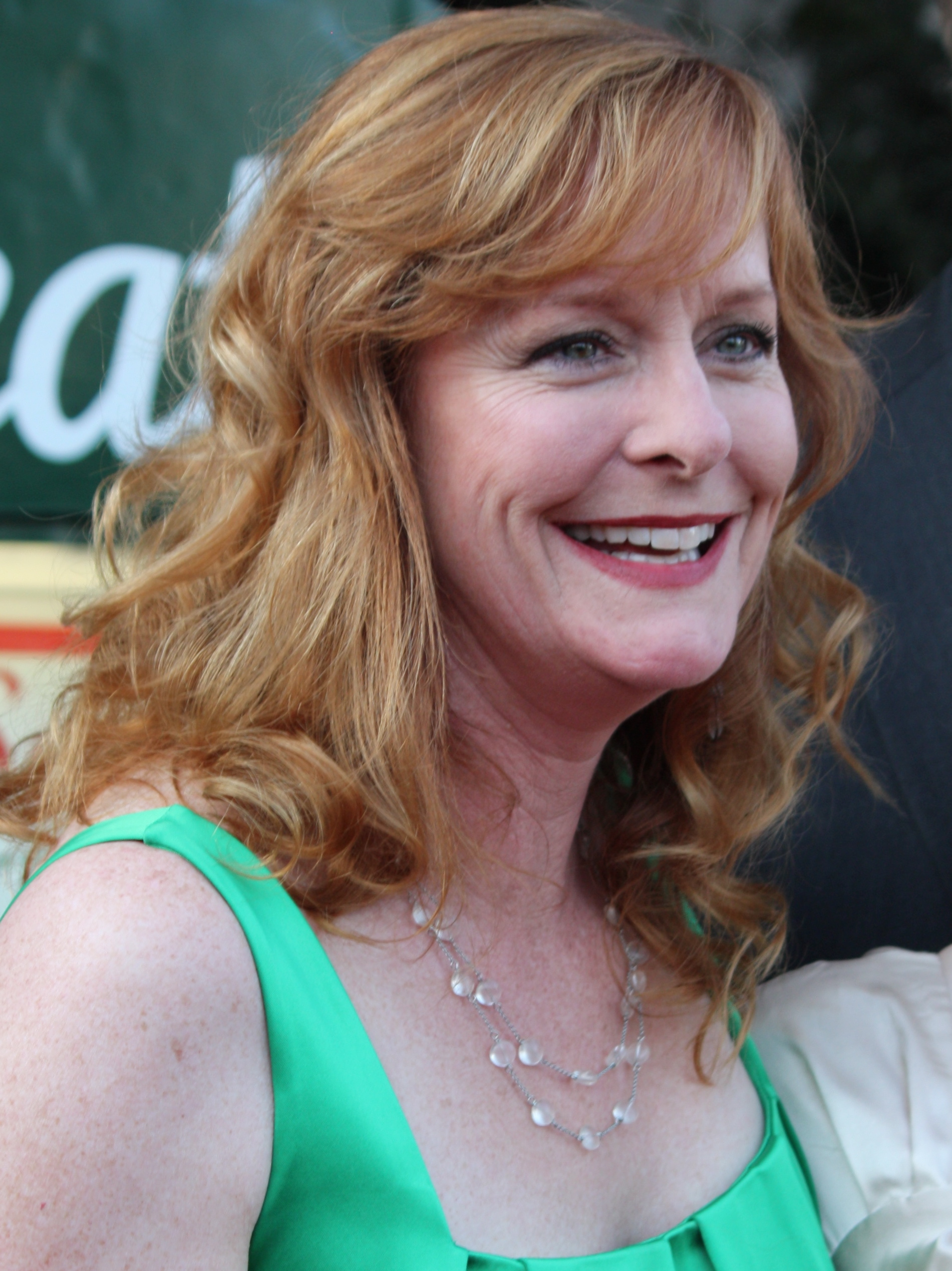
- McDonough at The Waltons' 40th anniversary in September 2012
- Born: May 4, 1961 (age 65); Los Angeles, California
- Occupations: Actress, writer
- Years active: 1963–present

Mary Elizabeth McDonough (born May 4, 1961), sometimes credited as Mary Beth McDonough, is an American actress and writer, best known for her role as Erin Walton on The Waltons from 1972 to 1981, and several subsequent made-for-television reunion films in later decades.

== Early life ==
McDonough was born on May 4, 1961 in the Van Nuys section of Los Angeles, California, the third of four children to Lawrence and Elizabeth (née Murray) McDonough. Her father was an Irish American ex-United States Navy from Nebraska, while her mother was from La Junta, Colorado. McDonough was raised in the Roman Catholic Church, in what she described as a working-class family. She and her siblings were raised in the Northridge section of Los Angeles, and attended the Our Lady of Lourdes School in Northridge. McDonough was an active theater student, and became interested in acting in elementary school.

== Career ==
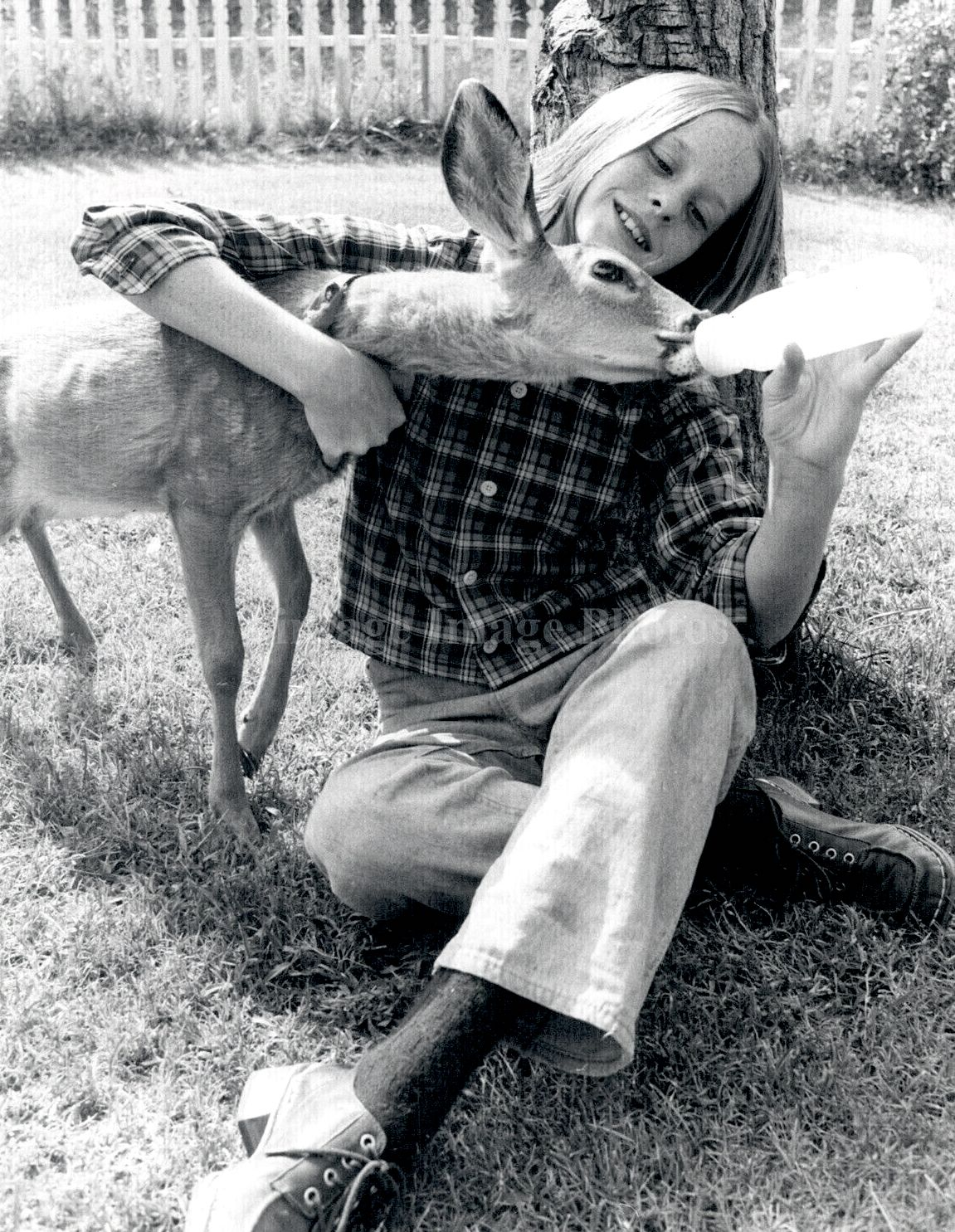
McDonough on set of The Waltons, 1973

McDonough began her career as a child actor, portraying Erin Walton in the series The Waltons beginning in September 1972, a role which she would portray until the series' finale nine years later in 1981. She appeared in the PBS children's television program Zoom as a ZOOMguest; the segment showed her filming the Season 1 episode "The Yearling" while she narrated.

She made her feature film debut with a minor part in the action film Lovely But Deadly (1981) before co-starring with Melissa Sue Anderson in the television horror film Midnight Offerings (1981). McDonough was subsequently cast in a lead role in the slasher horror film Mortuary (1983), opposite Lynda Day George and Bill Paxton.

She reprised her role of Erin Walton in several of The Waltons subsequent television reunion films A Wedding on Walton's Mountain, Mother's Day on Walton's Mountain, and A Day for Thanks on Walton's Mountain (all released and televised in 1982).

In 1987, she had a lead role in the dark comedy Funland, about an unhinged amusement park operator.

In the 1990s, McDonough appeared again as Erin Walton in a further three Waltons reunion made-for-TV films: A Walton Thanksgiving Reunion (1993), A Walton Wedding (1995), and A Walton Easter (1997).

In the 2000s, she returned to other television acting roles, guest-starring on Boston Legal (2004–2008 on ABC) and The New Adventures of Old Christine (2006–2010 on CBS).

McDonough has been a radio guest on international and syndicated shows such as Get Focused Radio with Kate Hennessy.

She can be seen on the internet in the show McDougall M.D. as part of the broadcasts on the TBN network.

In 2018, McDonough's book Christmas on Honeysuckle Lane was adapted into the Hallmark Channel film of the same name starring Alicia Witt and Colin Ferguson. McDonough also appeared in the film in a minor supporting role.

== Personal life ==
McDonough was married to Ron Wickstrom from 1988 to 1996. They have one child, Sydnee Wickstrom.

She married Don in 2011.

McDonough has lupus erythematosus, which, she claimed on her In the Know plastic surgery awareness website, stemmed from leaking silicone from her breast implants.

== Filmography ==
=== Film ===
Year	Title	Role	Notes
1981	Lovely But Deadly	Denise	
1982	Mortuary	Christie Parson	
1984	Snowballing	Karen Reed	
1985	Impure Thoughts	Sister Juliet	
1985	Waiting to Act	Linda	
1987	Funland	Kristin Cumming	
1989	The Making of Me	Wife / Mother of newborn	Short film
1991	Mom	Alice	
1994	Heaven Sent	Kathy Chandler	
1997	One of Those Nights	Andrea Harris	
2014	The Costume Shop	Jessica's Mom	
2014	Monster Hunters USA And Day Care Center	Mom Daily	Short film
2018	Amateur	Math Teacher	
2025	Sod & Stubble	Mary Bartsch	

=== Television ===
Year	Title	Role	Notes
1963	General Hospital	Heidi Hopkins	TV series
1971	The Homecoming: A Christmas Story	Erin Walton	TV pilot for The Waltons
1972–1981	The Waltons	Erin Walton	Main role (213 episodes)
1979	Beat The Clock	Herself (contestant)	Game show (5 episodes)
1980	The Waltons: A Decade of the Waltons	Erin Walton	TV film
1981	Midnight Offerings	Robin Prentiss	Television film
1982	A Wedding on Walton's Mountain	Erin Walton	Television film
1982	Mother's Day on Walton's Mountain	Erin Walton	Television film
1982	A Day for Thanks on Walton's Mountain	Erin Walton	Television film
1982	The Love Boat	Laura Barber	1 episode
1983	The Love Boat	Abby Foster	Episode: "Abby's Maiden Voyage"
1989	Hunter	Vera Donovan	Episode: "A Girl Named Hunter"
1993	Bodies of Evidence	Sarah Gentry	Episode: "The Formula"
1993	A Walton Thanksgiving	Erin Walton	TV film
1995	A Walton Wedding	Erin Walton	TV film
1995	The Secret World of Alex Mack	Betsy Phillips	Episode: "Suspect"
1996	Promised Land	Claire's Mother	Episode: "Christmas"
1997	A Walton Easter	Erin Walton	TV film
1997	ER	Jean Twomey	Episode: "Random Acts"
1998	Diagnosis: Murder	Colleen Akins	Episode: "Baby Boom"
1998	The Pretender	Mrs. Falk	Episode: "Crash"
1999	Ally McBeal	Attorney Gloria Stepp	Episode: "Only the Lonely"
1999	Walker, Texas Ranger	Jill Allen	Episode: "Safe House"
2001	The Division	Mrs. Berwin	Episode: "Secrets and Lies"
2002	The West Wing	Beth	Episode: "Game On"
2002	Will & Grace	Mom	Episodes: "Humongous Growth", "All About Christmas Eve"
2006	Boston Legal	Janice Warner	Episode: "Smile"
2006	Where There's a Will	Dr. Burton	TV film
2006–2009	The New Adventures of Old Christine	Mrs. Wilhoite	Recurring role (8 episodes)
2007	Christmas at Cadillac Jack's	Madge	TV film
2012	Lake Effects	Elizabeth	TV film
2018	Christmas on Honeysuckle Lane	Caroline Reynolds	Hallmark television film
2023	A Biltmore Christmas	The Director	Hallmark television film
2024	Holiday Touchdown: A Chiefs Love Story	Carole	Hallmark television film

=== Other work ===
Year	Title	Notes
1998	Creampuff	Associate producer
2000	For the Love of May	Director and writer

== Sources ==
- McDonough, Mary Elizabeth (2011). Lessons from the Mountain, What I Learned from Erin Walton. New York: Kensington Books. ISBN 978-0-7582-6366-7.
