= The Silent Force (TV series) =

- The cast, clockwise from top left: Ed Nelson as Ward Fuller, Lynda Day as Amelia Cole, and Percy Rodriguez as Jason Hart.
- Genre: Police drama
- Created by: Luther Davis
- Starring: Ed Nelson; Percy Rodriguez; Lynda Day
- Composer: Dominic Frontiere
- Country of origin: United States
- Original language: English
- No. of seasons: 1
- No. of episodes: 15

Production
- Executive producer: Walter Grauman (Note: According to The Classic TV Archive, Bruce Geller may have been an executive producer for The Silent Force in addition to or instead of Walter Grauman.)
- Running time: 30 minutes
- Production company: Aaron Spelling Productions

Original release
- Network: ABC
- Release: September 21, 1970 – January 11, 1971

The Silent Force is a 1970–1971 United States police drama television series about three United States Government undercover agents who fight organized crime starring Ed Nelson, Percy Rodriguez, and Lynda Day. It aired from September 21, 1970, to January 11, 1971. Unusually for a program of this type, it had only a thirty-minute run-time (including commercials) per episode.

== Cast ==
- Ed Nelson...Ward Fuller
- Percy Rodriguez...Jason Hart
- Lynda Day...Amelia Cole

== Synopsis ==
Ward Fuller, Jason Hart, and Amelia Cole make up the Silent Force, a team of U.S. government agents assigned to work undercover to infiltrate organized crime in Southern California. Their various operations involve them with companies and individuals victimized by or taking part in organized crime.

Each episode of The Silent Force opens with this narrative: "'If you do not, on a national scale, attack organized criminals with weapons and techniques as effective as their own, they will destroy us'...Robert F. Kennedy. An attack has been mounted from Washington; an undercover team of federal agents is the spearhead of that attack: The Silent Force."

== Production ==
Luther Davis created The Silent Force, and Walter Grauman was its executive producer. Grauman and Philip Barry, Jr. produced the show. Episode directors included Arnold Laven, George McCowan, and Gene Nelson. Writers included Davis, John Meredyth Lucas, Mark Rodgers, Donald S. Sanford, Jack Turley and the team of James D. Buchanan and Ronald Austin. Aaron Spelling Productions produced the show and Dominic Frontiere composed its music.

The show was filmed on the Paramount Pictures lot.

The Silent Force bore similarities to the hit CBS series Mission: Impossible. Coincidentally, Lynda Day (billed as Lynda Day George after her 1970 marriage to actor Christopher George) joined the cast of Mission: Impossible in 1971 after the cancellation of The Silent Force, and both Percy Rodriguez and Ed Nelson made guest appearances on the series (Rodriguez in season four's "Chico" and Nelson in season seven's "The Western").

In later interviews Day was dismissive of The Silent Force, calling it pre-Monday Night Football filler. In particular, she felt the short running time (The Silent Force occupied a half-hour time slot) was unsuitable for a show of its type and that her character Amelia Cole had little personality or background, though she spoke fondly of her two co-stars and the show's crew.

A "novelization" of the series, also entitled The Silent Force and written by Harry Goddard, was published in 1971.

== Broadcast history ==
The Silent Force premiered on ABC on September 21, 1970. It was panned by critics, and was cancelled after the broadcast of its fifteenth episode on January 11, 1971. It aired on Monday at 8:30 p.m. ET throughout its run.

== Episodes ==
Season #	Episode #	Title	Plot/Notes	Original air date
1	1	"Prosecutor"	The agents expose a candidate for governor of California as a member of organized crime. Lloyd Bochner, Mark Tapscott, and Eddie Firestone guest-star.	September 21, 1970
1	2	"The Hero"	James A. Watson, Jr., Martin E. Brooks, Murray Matheson, and Diane Summerfield guest-star.	September 28, 1970
1	3	"A Deadly Game of Love"	Mark Richman and Joan Van Ark guest-star.	October 5, 1970
1	4	"The Shopping List"	Dane Clark and Kevin Hagen guest-star.	October 12, 1970
1	5	"The Judge"	The sole prosecution witness in a police bribery case is shot, and the judge in the case is being paid off by a corrupt political machine. John Dehner, DeForest Kelley, Paul Carr, Loretta Leversee, Edward Ansara, and Dean Rhoads guest-star.	October 19, 1970
1	6	"The Wax Jungle"	The agents target the head of a record company who has connections with organized crime and will kill to control the lives of his stars. Linda Marsh, Robert Yuro, Jared Martin, Regis Philbin, Dick Patterson, John Armond, and Billy Shannon guest-star.	October 26, 1970
1	7	"Horse in a White Collar"	Bert Convy, Mala Powers, Anthony Eisley, and Natalie Trundy guest-star.	November 9, 1970
1	8	"Cry in Concrete"	The agents target loan sharks who victimize – and even murder – construction workers. Jeanne Cooper, Michael Conrad, Art Lewis, and Duncan McLeod guest-star.	November 16, 1970
1	9	"In By Nine, Out By Five"	After gangsters threaten the owner of a dry cleaning firm, he becomes the key to agents' efforts to smash a crime organization. Tom Bosley, Paul Lambert, Paul Harris, Aspa Nakapoulou, Del Monroe, and Carmen Zapata guest-star. This episode was originally scheduled for broadcast on November 2, 1970, but was postponed for three weeks.	November 23, 1970
1	10	"Take As Directed For Death"	After the murder of a doctor, the agents investigate the theft of U.S. government medical care funds by organized crime. Steve Ihnat, Arthur Batanides, and Michael Bell guest-star.	November 30, 1970
1	11	"The Courier"	Edward G. Robinson (Note: According to The Classic TV Archive, it is nor clear whether the actor who guest-starred in the episode "The Courier" was Edward G. Robinson or his son, Edward G. Robinson Jr.) guest-stars.	December 7, 1970
1	12	"A Family Tradition"	Stewart Moss, Anthony Caruso, and Roy Jenson guest-star.	December 14, 1970
1	13	"The Octopus"	Amelia poses as a gangster's wife as the agents combat the takeover of trucking companies by organized crime. Norman Alden, Richard Van Fleet, Albert Paulsen, Austin Willis, and Daniel J. Travanti guest-star.	December 21, 1970
1	14	"The Banker, Part 1"	John Vernon, Paul Stewart, Robert Pine, and Carla Borelli guest-star.	January 4, 1971
1	15	"The Banker, Part 2"	John Vernon, Paul Stewart, Robert Pine, and Carla Borelli guest-star.	January 11, 1971
