= Living in Oblivion =

- Theatrical release poster
- Directed by: Tom DiCillo
- Written by: Tom DiCillo
- Produced by: Michael Griffiths; Marcus Viscidi
- Starring: Steve Buscemi; Catherine Keener; Dermot Mulroney; Danielle von Zerneck; James LeGros
- Cinematography: Frank Prinzi
- Edited by: Dana Congdon; Camilla Toniolo
- Music by: Jim Farmer
- Distributed by: Sony Pictures Classics (United States); Summit Entertainment (Overseas)
- Release date: July 21, 1995
- Running time: 90 minutes
- Country: United States
- Language: English
- Budget: $500,000
- Box office: $1.1 million

Living in Oblivion is a 1995 American independent satirical black comedy film written and directed by Tom DiCillo. It stars Steve Buscemi, Catherine Keener, Dermot Mulroney, Danielle von Zerneck, James LeGros, and Peter Dinklage in his film debut. The film won the Waldo Salt Screenwriting Award at the 1995 Sundance Film Festival for DiCillo. It received critical acclaim.

== Plot ==
In New York City, a low-budget independent film's catering crew is underfunded and apathetic, deciding not to replace a carton of milk on the craft service table for a week. The scene being shot is about a young woman, Ellen, reproaching her mother for not intervening when the father beat Ellen as a child. Shots are spoiled because of how the microphone is visible; the camera assistant fails to keep the shot in focus, a light gets blown which then causes Cora, the actress playing the mother, to forget her lines and Nicole, the actress playing Ellen, to become unfocused and careless.

When Nicole berates herself for subpar acting, Cora reassures her with a gesture that reminds Nicole of a similar gesture made by her own terminally ill mother. Upset by the memory, Nicole turns in a passionate performance; Cora, taken aback, is equally good. However, their performance is not captured on film; cinematographer and camera operator Wolf, who has been diluting the substandard coffee with spoiled milk, has been vomiting in the toilet throughout. Nick, the film's director, calls for another take. This time, an incessant beeping sound distracts the actors. Nobody can tell where it is coming from and Nick becomes furious, berating everyone on the crew and cast for their inadequacies. Nick wakes up in his own bed; the beeping sound is his alarm clock. He has dreamed the entire situation. It is 4:30 a.m. and he is due on set.

Early the same morning, the film's lead actor Chad Palomino gets dressed in Nicole's hotel room. They have had sex, and Chad suggests that they might get together again later. Nicole politely declines. Chad and Nicole arrive on the set separately. Nicole's character Ellen and Chad's character Damian have been in love for years but have never admitted it, until the scene being shot on that day. Shooting the scene is made practically impossible by Chad's irregular acting. He continually moves to places where he is either invisible or badly lit. Nicole gets frustrated, and when Chad starts to stroke her head, she briefly loses her cool and apologizes. Irritated, Chad demands a private talk with Nick. He tells him that he has had sex with Nicole and makes out that it was she, not he, who had wanted to continue the relationship. To keep Chad happy, Nick agrees that Nicole is terrible. Nicole overhears this conversation on the sound mixer's headphones. Pretending to be contrite, she asks Nick if they can improvise a little, but when they do so, she announces to everyone that, although she had sex with Chad, she is not at all interested in him. Chad angrily quits the film. Relieved that he will no longer have to please Chad, Nick calls him a "Hostess Twinkie motherfucker" and a fight breaks out. Nick beats Chad senseless and fires him. He apologizes to Nicole and confesses that he loves her. They kiss, and Nicole abruptly wakes up, still in her bed, having dreamed the entire segment.

Later the same day, the crew sets up for a dream sequence in which Nicole, as Ellen, stands still, while dwarf actor Tito walks around her with an apple. Nick claims to have learned a lesson from his own dream: that sometimes "you just gotta roll with things." Nicole admits that she dreamed of Nick but does not mention what happened. The smoke machine is set ablaze, and Nick's senile mother Cora arrives on the set, but he keeps up his positive attitude. Tito complains that his appearance in a dream sequence is cliché and leaves the set in disgust. Nick's confidence collapses, and he announces that the film is over. His mother then intervenes, grabbing the apple, moving to Tito's mark, and announcing that she is "ready". The crew scrambles to shoot the scene, and her manic performance injects fresh energy and conviction into it. Delighted, Nick decides to keep the new dream sequence. The sound recordist asks for silence, so he can get room tone. During this moment, cast and crew daydream about their futures. They go on to shoot the next sequence.

== Cast ==
- Steve Buscemi as Nick Reve, an intense and hopeful independent film director. He is sensitive and thoughtful with actors and tries to respect the status and dignity of everyone on the set, but sometimes the frustration just gets too much. His surname 'Reve' is derived from and pronounced like the French word rêve, meaning 'dream'.
- Catherine Keener as Nicole, an actress playing the female lead in Nick's film. Nicole is secretly in love with Nick. Although he believes she is a fine actress, Nicole is fatalistic, believing that she will one day give up acting and seek work as a waitress or short order cook.
- Dermot Mulroney as Wolf, a talented but pretentious and prima donna-ish cinematographer and camera operator. He is in a relationship with Wanda, although she breaks up with him at the beginning of the third part. He is opinionated, sulky, and obstinate. His surname is Überman, as shown on the clapperboard.
- Danielle von Zerneck as Wanda, the film's first assistant director.
- James LeGros as Chad Palomino, the male lead in Nick's film, a major Hollywood actor appearing in a low-budget film to gain critical kudos. Chad is a selfish egomaniac. All of his suggestions about changing the blocking are in fact covert attempts to place himself in the foreground of the frame, instead of in the background. He turns out to be also a liar, admitting to Nick that he considers him a "loser" and that he only accepted the role "because I thought you were tight with Quentin Tarantino!" This character is sometimes assumed to be based on Brad Pitt, but this is not the case according to the director on the DVD commentary track.
- Rica Martens as Cora Reve, Nick's mother, who on set is both a nuisance and a savior.
- Peter Dinklage as Tito, a frustrated dwarf actor complaining about his clichéd roles.
- Michele Carlo as Nurse

== Background ==
DiCillo got inspiration for the film from the frustrations he experienced when making the film Johnny Suede, and his long struggle to make his next intended film, Box of Moonlight. Living in Oblivion was rejected by all producers, but the actors and friends of the director felt so strongly about the project that they financed it. Two of the producers, Michael Griffiths and Hilary Gilford, were given parts in the movie for helping to finance the film. Griffiths plays Speedo, the sound mixer; Gilford plays the unnamed script girl.

The film is divided into three parts. The first part was shot in five days and after DiCillo realized that it was too short to be a feature and too long to be a short he expanded it into a full feature film with parts two and three. The film title was taken from the hit '80s song by synth-pop artists Anything Box.

== Reception ==
The film was acclaimed by critics. On the website Rotten Tomatoes, it has an approval rating of 86%, based on 36 reviews, with an average rating of 7.7/10. The website's consensus reads, "Living in Oblivion dives into the folly of filmmaking with a sharp satire that sends up indie cinema while working as an entertaining independent picture in its own right." On Metacritic, the film holds a weighted average score of 81 out of 100, based on 17 reviews, indicating "universal acclaim".

DiCillo won the Waldo Salt Screenwriting Award at the 1995 Sundance Film Festival.

The American Film Institute nominated the film for its AFI's 100 Years...100 Laughs list.

== Home media ==
The 2003 Sony Pictures Home Entertainment release includes a commentary by Tom DiCillo, deleted scenes and an interview with DiCillo and Buscemi. Shout! Factory released a 2-disc set Blu-ray on November 17, 2015.

== See also ==
- List of films featuring fictional films
