= Christmas on Honeysuckle Lane =

- Film poster
- Based on: The House on Honeysuckle Lane
- Written by: Caitlin D. Fryers
- Directed by: Maggie Greenwald
- Starring: Alicia Witt; Colin Ferguson
- Music by: Michael Richard Plowman
- Countries of origin: United States; Canada
- Original language: English

Production
- Executive producer: Danielle von Zerneck
- Producers: Andrew Gernhard; Erica Joseph Hunter; Colin Theys
- Cinematography: Branden James Maxham
- Editor: Keith Reamer
- Running time: 120 minutes

Original release
- Network: Hallmark Channel; Hallmark Movies & Mysteries
- Release: November 24, 2018

Christmas on Honeysuckle Lane is a 2018 American-Canadian television film starring Alicia Witt and Colin Ferguson, based on the novel by Mary Elizabeth McDonough. The film premiered on Hallmark Channel and Hallmark Movies & Mysteries on November 24, 2018.

== Plot ==
After their parents have died, Emma and her siblings spend a nostalgic Christmas in their family home before putting the house on Honeysuckle Lane up for sale.

== Cast ==
- Alicia Witt as Emma Reynolds
- Colin Ferguson as Morgan Shelby
- Jordan Dean as Daniel Reynolds
- Laura Leighton as Andie
- Ariane Rinehart as Rumi
- Blair Busbee as Maureen
- Debra Lord Cooke as Grace
- Owen Dammacco as Marco
- Blair Lewin as Anne Marie
- Gary Lindemann as Cliff
- Fiona Morgan Quinn as Sophie
- John Palladino as Ian Tillman
- Jill Larson as Rachel Jacobs
- Mary Beth McDonough as Caroline Reynolds
- Josiah Harvey as Townsperson / Party Guest
- David Boston as House Party Guest
- Kami Cotler as Townsperson
- Courtney Gonzalez as Townsperson
- Michelle Patnode as Townsperson
- Bill Salvatore as Townsperson At Outdoor Concert
- Paul Tawczynski as Townsperson
- Katie Vandrilla as Townsperson

== Notes ==
The filming location was in Old Wethersfield, Connecticut, and over the course of two weeks location in the town included Comstock Ferre and Co., the Silas Robbins Bed and Breakfast, the Webb-Deane-Stevens Museum.
