= Mortuary (1982 film) =

- Original movie poster
- Directed by: Howard Avedis
- Written by: Howard Avedis
- Produced by: Edward L. Montoro; Marlene Schmidt
- Starring: Mary McDonough; David Wallace; Bill Paxton; Lynda Day George; Christopher George
- Cinematography: Gary Graver
- Edited by: Stanford C. Allen
- Music by: John Cacavas
- Production company: Hickmar Productions
- Distributed by: Artists Releasing Corporation; Film Ventures International
- Release dates: May 7, 1982 (Tucson, Arizona); September 2, 1983 (Los Angeles)
- Running time: 92 minutes
- Country: United States
- Language: English
- Box office: $4.3 million

Mortuary is a 1982 (Note: Though sometimes listed as a 1983 production, the film was first released in 1982.) American slasher film directed by Howard Avedis and starring Mary Beth McDonough, Bill Paxton, David Wallace, Lynda Day George, and Christopher George in his final film role before his death. It follows a young woman who, while investigating the death of her father, exposes disturbing secrets surrounding a local mortuary.

Filmed in Southern California, Mortuary was first released regionally in 1982 before its release expanded the following year in the fall of 1983, after it was acquired by Film Ventures International. Mortuary was a box-office success, ranking among the top twenty highest-grossing films at the time of its release, and went on to earn over $4 million internationally. The film received some favorable reviews from critics, who praised its cinematography, performances, and direction.

== Plot ==
Wealthy psychiatrist Dr. George Parson is bludgeoned and drowned in his pool, an incident his daughter Christie believes was murder, but which her mother Eve insists was an accident. Several weeks later, Josh, an ex-employee at a local mortuary, sneaks into the mortuary warehouse with Christie's boyfriend Greg, planning to steal tires as compensation for unpaid wages from his boss, Hank Andrews. Inside, the two men observe an occult sabbath, which Josh is inured to, having been fired for witnessing one before. While retrieving the tires, Josh is stabbed to death with a trocar by a cloaked assailant. Shortly after, Greg observes his van speeding away and assumes that Josh is driving it.

Later that night, Greg and Christie search for Josh at the local roller skating rink, but cannot find him. The following day, Christie is pursued by a car en route to her family's secluded coastal mansion. After an argument with her mother, Christie, who has begun sleepwalking after the trauma of her father's death, wakes to find herself in the pool, and is accosted by a hooded figure. She flees into the house, but Eve assures her it was only a dream. The next day, Greg confesses to Christie that he saw Eve in attendance at the sabbath he witnessed at the mortuary. Christie suspects her mother and Hank, whom Christie believes Eve began dating only weeks after her husband's death, may have murdered Christie's father, and are orchestrating a plot to drive her insane.

Meanwhile, Paul, Hank's son and an embalmer at the mortuary, vies for Christie's attention. She and Greg dismiss his eccentricities on the basis of his mentally-ill mother's recent suicide. That night, Greg and Christie spend time alone in her home, but are subjected to various electronic interruptions, such as lights turning on and off, and the stereo playing by itself. The next day, Greg and Christie follow Eve to the mortuary, where they observe her engaging in a séance with Hank and the women from the meeting Josh and Greg had earlier witnessed; they are trying to contact Eve's late husband, and Christie realizes that her mother and Hank were not dating at all. Via Hank, Eve tells her husband that she and Christie love him very much, but she thinks his attempts to stay in touch are damaging Christie. The table starts to move, and Hank speaks to George about his dying in an accident, then communicates that George has said it was not an accident, someone caused his death. The contact is then lost, and as Hank calls for George to come back, Christie and Greg leave. That night, Christie is attacked by a cloaked figure resembling Paul, and smashes a glass window, startling her mother. Eve assumes it to have been a nightmare, but asks Christie if the alleged attacker could have been Paul; she explains that Paul was a patient of Christie's father, and that he had been obsessed with her, but they didn't believe he was dangerous.

After Christie and Eve return to their bedrooms, a cloaked figure viciously stabs Eve to death while she lies in bed. The assailant, revealed to be Paul donning a white latex mask, chases Christie through the house. He attempts to stab her, but she unmasks him before he renders her unconscious. He brings her to the mortuary, where he begins the process of embalming her alive, but is stopped when Hank arrives. Paul explains that he had to "punish" Eve for telling Christie about his psychiatric condition, and that he had murdered Dr. Parson for previously suggesting he should have treatment in a mental hospital, which his father had refused to agree to. Paul stabs his father in a rage, killing him, before being confronted by Greg, who has come searching for Christie. Paul manages to lock Greg in the embalming room.

Paul takes Christie and the corpses of Eve and his father to the warehouse, where he has arranged a makeshift wedding ceremony for himself and Christie. Surrounded by the preserved bodies of his victims, Paul pretends to conduct a Mozart symphony; among them is the body of Paul's mother, whose death he faked and whom he has induced into a coma. As he attempts to cut Christie's throat with a scalpel, Paul is attacked by Greg, who has broken free and armed himself with an axe. In the mêlée, Christie begins to sleepwalk, and proceeds to take the axe and drive it into Paul's back, killing him. Greg and Christie embrace, before Mrs. Andrews suddenly awakens from her coma, lunging at the couple with a knife.

== Cast ==
- Mary Beth McDonough as Christie Parson
- David Wallace as Greg Stevens
- Bill Paxton as Paul Andrews
- Christopher George as Hank Andrews
- Lynda Day George as Eve Parson
- Bill Conklin as Sheriff Duncan
- Curt Ayers as Jim
- Donna Garrett as Mrs. Andrews
- Danny Rogers as Dr. Parson
- Greg Kaye as Mark
- Denis Mandel as Josh
- Alvy Moore as Bob Stevens
- Marlene Schmidt as Lois Stevens

== Production ==
Mortuary was announced in late September 1980 as a suspense film spearheaded by Howard Avedis and Marlene Schmidt under their banner Hickmar Productions, targeting the wave of post‑Halloween slashers. Initial budget projections ranged from US $850,000 to $900,000, though some promotional reports inflated the figure dramatically to as high as $7–9 million; insiders later confirmed the lower estimate reflected reality.

== Release ==
World premiere advertisement, Arizona Daily Star

Hickmar Productions first released Mortuary regionally, screening it in Tucson, Arizona beginning May 7, 1982. It later opened in Newport News, Virginia on July 8, 1983 before premiering in Los Angeles on September 2, 1983.

A promotional trailer was shot exclusively for the film's release, which features actor Michael Berryman, though he never appeared in the film.

=== Home media ===
Hokushin Audio Visual released the film on VHS and Betamax in the United Kingdom in December 1983. In the United States, Mortuary received a VHS release through Vestron Video in 1984.

On May 15, 2012, the film was finally transferred to DVD with a 16×9 (1.78:1) HD master from the original inter-negative by Scorpion Releasing, in conjunction with Camelot Entertainment. The special features included play with or without the "Nightmare Theater" experience, on camera interview with composer John Cacavas, and the original trailer.

On October 7, 2014, Scorpion Releasing released the film on Blu-ray in a limited edition run of only 1,200 copies. MVD Visual released a new Blu-ray edition on July 6, 2021.

== Reception ==
=== Box office ===
The film grossed $763,184 during its fall 1983 release in 146 theaters, and went on to have a worldwide box-office gross of $4,319,001. As of January 1984, the film ranked among the top twenty highest-grossing films at the U.S. box office.

=== Critical response ===
Variety described the film as superior to the average "stab-and-slab" horror film, while the Arizona Daily Star's Jacqi Tully praised Mortuary as "cool and sleek looking... Avedis has written in a romantic element with more psychological dread than physical horror." Linda Gross of the Los Angeles Times also gave it a favorable review, describing it as a "sick, scary slasher movie," but conceded that the screenplay "goes overboard on the gore." Gross also praised Gary Graver's cinematography as "classy, and at times, very beautiful." Henry Edgar of the Daily Press praised the film as well-crafted, writing: "Mortuary is rare among horror films. Even though the script leaves a few holes, the dialogue is mostly natural and the director keeps the motion moving at a quick pace."

George Williams of The Sacramento Bee gave the film an unfavorable review, writing that it "is so embarrassingly bad its creators decided to put it on a shelf as an act of mercy." Robert C. Trussell of The Kansas City Star also panned the film for its dialogue and "unconvincing" violence, writing: "There is absolutely nothing to recommend Mortuary, a wretched 1981 film featuring one of the last performances of the late Christopher George."
