= Cruise Into Terror =

1978 American TV film by Bruce Kessler

- Written by: Michael Braverman
- Directed by: Bruce Kessler
- Starring: Dirk Benedict; John Forsythe; Frank Converse; Christopher George; Lynda Day George; Jo Ann Harris; Lee Meriwether; Ray Milland
- Music by: Gerald Fried
- Country of origin: United States
- Original language: English

Production
- Producers: Douglas S. Cramer; Aaron Spelling
- Cinematography: Arch Dalzell
- Editors: Dennis Virkler; John Wright
- Running time: 100 minutes
- Production company: Aaron Spelling Productions

Original release
- Network: ABC
- Release: February 3, 1978

Cruise Into Terror is a 1978 American made-for-television horror film directed by Bruce Kessler. The film originally premiered February 3, 1978 on ABC. The all-star supporting cast features (in alphabetical order) Dirk Benedict, Frank Converse, John Forsythe, Christopher George, Lynda Day George, Lee Meriwether, Ray Milland, Hugh O'Brian, Stella Stevens, Roger E. Mosley, and Marshall Thompson.

== Plot ==
A commercial pleasure ship, cruising near the Gulf of Mexico, brings aboard a sunken Egyptian sarcophagus which contains the son of Satan.

== Cast ==
- Dirk Benedict as Simon Mclane
- Frank Converse as Matt Lazarus
- John Forsythe as Reverend Charles Mather
- Christopher George as Neal Barry
- Lynda Day George as Sandra Barry
- Jo Ann Harris as Judy Haines
- Hilary Thompson as Debbie Porter
- Lee Meriwether as Lil Mather
- Ray Milland as Dr. Isiah Bakkun
- Hugh O'Brian as Captain Andrews
- Stella Stevens as Marilyn Magnesun
- Roger E. Mosley as Nathan
- Marshall Thompson as Bennett
