= The Babysitter (1980 film) =

- Genre: Drama; Horror; Thriller
- Written by: Jennifer Miller
- Directed by: Peter Medak
- Starring: Patty Duke Astin; William Shatner; Stephanie Zimbalist; John Houseman
- Country of origin: United States
- Original language: English

Production
- Executive producer: Frank von Zerneck
- Producer: David Garcia
- Cinematography: Rexford Metz
- Editor: Melvin Shapiro
- Running time: 96 minutes
- Production company: Filmways Television

Original release
- Network: ABC
- Release: November 28, 1980

The Babysitter is a 1980 American made-for-television thriller film directed by Peter Medak and starring Patty Duke Astin, William Shatner and Stephanie Zimbalist about a young girl hired as a live-in nanny who infiltrates and tries to destroy a suburban Seattle family. The film originally premiered as The ABC Friday Night Movie on November 28, 1980.

== Plot ==
Dr. Jeff Benedict and his wife Liz have relocated to Seattle from Chicago. They have a 12-year-old daughter, Tara. Liz feels that she needs some help with childcare and housekeeping. She happens to meet an 18-year-old girl named Joanna Redwine. Without consulting her husband, Liz hires Joanna as a live-in nanny. She weans Tara off of TV and engages her in outdoor activities.

The Benedicts' neighbor Doc Lindquist watches Joanna warily one day as she pushes Tara to exhaust herself swimming. At a party, he overhears Joanna tell his grandson Scotty that she had lived in Seattle prior to working for the Benedicts. He points out to Jeff that this story does not match the one that she had told Liz. Doc begins his own quiet investigation into Joanna's background and finds it almost impossible to recreate where she has lived, because of the many foster homes where she had lived and the fact that she is legally an adult.

Liz still is overly stressed and begins to confide in Joanna. She is convinced that Jeff has a mistress in Seattle. She explains that she has not had a drink in a year. Joanna suggests that there is no harm in having a drink.

Liz's drinking quickly spirals out of control. Jeff leaves her at Doc's house during a party. Back at home, Joanna is waiting for Jeff in the master bedroom. She attempts to seduce Jeff, but he asks her to leave. The next day, Joanna tells Liz that Jeff had come into her bedroom when he came home from the party. Joanna suggests she should leave, but stays at Liz's insistence. Meanwhile, Doc continues his investigation into Joanna's background by going to The Department of Social Services. A clerk at the counter refuses to give Doc the information because Joanna at 18, is past the age to be considered a child. The clerk steps away from the counter for a moment, leaving Joanna's file on the counter. Doc is able to sneakily peruse the file and quickly jot down some important information. The clerk returns and informs Doc that they are not able to help him anymore; Doc thanks him and walks away. Doc heads to visit an address, presumably obtained from the file. Doc arrives at the home of Mrs. Welford pretending to be Joanna's doctor. Mrs. Welford acknowledges that she fostered Joanna some years ago, and issues a strong warning to Doc to send her to someone else, and to stay away from her, or otherwise he will regret it. Mrs. Welford tells Doc that Joanna killed her baby. Doc meets with Liz and Jeff to discuss the information he found. Liz rejects the information because the police were not involved. Further, she considers the investigation by Doc to be a malicious attempt to spread gossip about a teenage girl. Liz abruptly walks away, but Jeff apologizes to Doc, although he questions Doc's motives for pursuing the matter. Doc explains that he has a bad gut feeling about Joanna. Doc apologizes for the impasse and invites the family on an outing on the boat on Sunday. As Joanna's manipulations start to become more overt, she begins to neglect her duties. She is cross with Tara and stops maintaining the house.

One day, when Joanna, Scotty, and Tara go for a sail, Joanna releases the jib boom into Scotty's head, knocking him unconscious into the water. As Tara pleads for Joanna to help Scotty, she silently sails the boat away from his floating body. Doc urges the police to investigate Scotty's death, but there is no compelling evidence that it is anything other than an accident. Doc's investigation into Joanna grows more urgent, and he finally tracks down her last address.

Meanwhile, as Liz is confined to bedrest, Jeff finally allows himself to be seduced by Joanna. The next day, Joanna serves Tara and Jeff raw, whole beef tongue for dinner. She comes downstairs in Liz's negligee and kisses Jeff, who apologizes for sleeping with her and fires her. He promises to take her to Seattle the next morning and set her up with some money. Meanwhile, Doc arrives at Joanna's last house to find the bodies of three people in the master bedroom wrapped in plastic.

Joanna knocks Jeff out and chases Tara down into the basement. Tara flees back upstairs and tries to wake up a sedated Liz. Joanna grabs a kitchen knife and returns to the bedroom. Jeff wakes up and manages to wrestle the knife out of her hands. Doc arrives with the police as Joanna is finally stopped. The police lead her out of the house and put her in a patrol car. Tara gives Joanna her doll as the movie ends.

== Cast ==
- Patty Duke Astin as Liz Benedict
- William Shatner as Dr. Jeff Benedict
- Quinn Cummings as Tara Benedict
- David Wysocki as Scotty (credited as David Wallace)
- Stephanie Zimbalist as Joanna Redwine
- John Houseman as Dr. Lindquist
- Kenneth Tigar as Tom Montgomery
- Virginia Kiser as Mrs. Welford
- Hildy Brooks as Barbara
- Frank Birney as Mr. Farragut
- Ty Haller as Minister (as Richard Ty Haller)
