= Howie Horwitz =

American television producer (1918–1976)

Howard Santly Horwitz (May 22, 1918 – June 25, 1976) was an American television producer, remembered as the producer of 77 Sunset Strip between 1958 and 1964 and the Batman television series between 1966 and 1968.

== Biography ==
He was born in New York City. By the early 1950s, he was working as assistant to producer George Stevens at Paramount Pictures, on films including A Place in the Sun (1951) and Shane (1953). After moving into television, he became producer of 77 Sunset Strip from 1958. Writer and producer Joel Rogosin described Horwitz as "very innovative", producing one episode in real time, another with no dialogue, and another in which the star, Efrem Zimbalist Jr., was the sole performer.

He was appointed as producer for Batman in 1966, working with executive producer William Dozier and chief scriptwriter Lorenzo Semple. Horwitz said that the only message of the show was "wholesome entertainment". He later worked on the TV series The Immortal (1970–71), Banacek (1972-74), and Baretta (1975).

He was nominated for Emmy awards for Batman (Outstanding Comedy Series, 1966) and Baretta (Outstanding Drama Series, 1976).

Horwitz died at June Lake, California, aged 58, following a fall when on a family holiday. He was the uncle of singer and songwriter Lesley Gore, who appeared in the role of Pussycat in the Batman series, and of her brother, film composer Michael Gore.
