= Sod & Stubble =

- Theatrical release poster
- Directed by: Ken Spurgeon
- Written by: Ken Spurgeon
- Based on: Sod & Stubble by John Ise
- Produced by: Bailey Chase; Randy Edens; Deb Goodrich; Mark Mannette; Tom Penning
- Starring: Bailey Chase; Dodie Brown; Barry Corbin; Mary Beth McDonough; Buck Taylor
- Cinematography: Logan McNay
- Edited by: Logan McNay
- Production companies: New Albany Films; Sod and Stubble Films; Fall RiveT Productions
- Distributed by: Purdie Distribution
- Release dates: March 28, 2025 (Orpheum Theater); April 18, 2025 (United States)
- Running time: 102 minutes
- Country: United States
- Language: English
- Budget: $500,000
- Box office: $68,677

Sod & Stubble is a 2025 American western drama film directed and written by Ken Spurgeon. The film follows the adversities of a family pioneering on the plains of Kansas. It is based on the 1936 nonfiction book of the same name, written by John Ise, the son of the main protagonists.

The film premiered at the Orpheum Theater on March 28, 2025, and was released in the United States on April 18, 2025.

== Premise ==
The adventures and adversities of a family pioneering on the plains of Kansas.

== Cast ==
- Bailey Chase as Henry Ise, a German immigrant
- Dodie Brown as Rosa Ise, Henry's wife
- Barry Corbin as Vietz
- Mary Beth McDonough as Mary Bartsch
- Buck Taylor as John C. Haag
- Delno Ebie as Steve Linge

== Production ==
Sod & Stubble began filming in June 2023 at the Miller Farm, with parts being filmed at Wichita.; El Dorado, Kansas; Osborne, Kansas; and Jewell County, Kansas.

== Release ==
Sod & Stubble first premiered at the Orpheum Theater on March 28, 2025, and was released in the United States on April 18, 2025.
