= Michele Carlo =

- Born: New York City, New York
- Education: School of Visual Arts, New York City, New York
- Occupations: Author and Performance Artist

Michele Carlo is an author, performer, and artist based in New York City. Her work focuses on personal experiences as a Latina and self-proclaimed Nuyorican growing up and living within New York City.

== Biography ==
=== Early life ===
The daughter of two Puerto Rican parents from Spanish Harlem, Michele Carlo grew up with her family in a primarily Italian and Irish neighborhood in the East Bronx. Much of her later artistic work focuses on issues of identity stemming from childhood experiences in the Bronx.

=== Career ===
Carlo attended New York City Community College for a year before being accepted into the School of Visual Arts. She obtained the position of assistant art director at an advertising agency, however after participating in a production of Guys & Dolls, Carlo decided to suspend her pursuit of a career in visual arts in favor of one in acting and performance. In 1995, she appeared in the independent film Living in Oblivion. From 1995 to roughly 2004, Carlo was a regular participant in productions at Surf Reality, an underground venue on Manhattan's Lower East Side. Beginning in the mid-2000s, she began appearing at performance storytelling events hosted by The Moth, The Liar Show, and Literary Deathmatch. Carlo published her memoir, Fish Out of Agua: My Life on Neither Side of the (Subway) Tracks, in 2010. Her essays and stories have also been published in the Huffington Post and SMITH magazines, Chicken Soup for the Latino Soul and Lost & Found: Stories from New York.

== Works ==
=== Books ===
- Fish Out of Agua: My Life on Neither Side of the (Subway) Tracks (2010)

=== Shows/Performances ===
- There Goes the Neighborhood (2016)
- Super Storytellers Edition (2013–present)
- Fish Out of Agua: My Life on Neither Side of the (Subway) Tracks (adapted into a solo performance)
- It Came from New York (2005–present)

=== Reviews/Interviews ===
- Curbed New York (2016)
- La Cosmopolatina (2011)
- Wall Street Journal (2010)
- Daily News (2010)
- Latina Magazine (2010)
- Galley Cat (2010)
- Time Out New York (2010)
- Travalanche (2010)
- Blog Talk Radio (2010)
- SMITH Magazine (2009)

Awards/Recognitions

- "Next Door Neighbor Contest" Winner (2009)

== Literary Styles and Themes ==
Most of Michele Carlo's work is heavily influenced by her upbringing in a predominantly Italian and Irish neighborhood in the East Bronx, and her experiences navigating New York City as a Latina artist of Puerto Rican descent ever since. In Carlo's 2010 memoir, Fish Out of Agua, she calls herself a "double outsider:" Her freckles and curly red hair caused people to often mistake her as white, much to the dismay of her proudly Spanish-speaking relatives, yet she finds that she is not white enough for her friends and schoolmates. At one point she recalls her father telling other residents of their neighborhood that although they may be Puerto Rican, their family was from the "Italian part" of Puerto Rico, in an attempt to avoid ostracism and prejudice. Later, she recalls getting lost at a Puerto Rican Day parade and a voice on the loudspeaker announcing, "'Will the family who brought the little redheaded white girl please come pick her up?' I looked around. I am at the bandstand! I am that lost girl!" In her memoir, Carlo's descriptions of such memories use both intimately personal memories as well as humor in order to chronicle a childhood of trying to find some sort of balance in her identity.

"New York is like a shark," she says in an article by Curbed New York. "If it stops moving, it dies." In her latest project, There Goes the Neighborhood, Carlo continues to use her own experiences to reflect New York City's ever-evolving nature. The 55-minute solo performance revolves around her struggle to find a new apartment after being forced out of the one she had lived in for twenty years, and in doing so touches on issues of gentrification in Brooklyn. At one point in the show, she describes riding in a car with a realtor who, not realizing that Carlo herself is Puerto Rican, tells her, "I don't recommend that you take an apartment above 10th street, dear...That's where all the Puerto Ricans live." This personal account provides evidence of the physical and social boundaries that obviously still exist within many New York neighborhoods, and in doing so speaks directly to Carlo's Latinx audience (especially those who may be white-passing).

In the article by Curbed New York, she also cites the formation of the Prospect Park Alliance and its successful efforts at cleaning up the park and the surrounding area as a tipping point for Brooklyn's gentrification. "Nobody wants to be chased up five flights of stairs screaming, 'Open the door' because you're about to be jumped. but why can't there be some kind of common ground that respects the elderly and longtime residents that do not have the wherewithal or desire to relocate? How is it right to tell a family, 'Well now that the neighborhood's safer, and the park is clean and the schools are better, you don't get to live here anymore.'" In her observations of this transformation, Carlo questions the motives of those who led the effort to make this area "the beautiful oasis it is today." In cleaning up the area surrounding Prospect Park, did such groups also hope to scrub out long-time residents and racial minorities, as well as the unique culture they had created? Overall, reflections on the past in There Goes the Neighborhood and Carlo's other works provide more than just moments of nostalgia for New York natives. They chronicle the evolution of an entire city, and how these changes affect entire groups of people and the Latinx community as a whole.

== Works cited ==
- "Author, Storyteller, Performer." Michele Carlo. Michele Carlo, n.d. Web. 08. Mar. 2017.
- Carlo, Michele. Fish Out of Agua: My Life On Neither Side of the (Subway) Tracks. New York: Citadel, 2010. Print.
- Michele Carlo at NYSX January 2016. Perf. Michele Carlo. Youtube. NY Story Exchange, 1 Feb. 2016. Web. 08. Mar. 2017.
- Rosenberg, Zoe. "Author Michele Carlo on the Transformation of NYC." Curbed NY. Curbed NY, 02 Mar. 2016. Web. 08. Mar. 2017.
