= The Delta Factor (film) =

1970 film by Tay Garnett

- Original film poster
- Directed by: Tay Garnett
- Written by: Raoul Walsh; Tay Garnett
- Based on: The Delta Factor by Mickey Spillane
- Produced by: Robert Fellows; Tay Garnett
- Starring: Yvette Mimieux; Christopher George
- Edited by: Richard W. Farrell
- Music by: Howard Danziger
- Production companies: Medallion Television; Spillane-Fellows Productions Inc.
- Distributed by: Continental Distributing
- Release date: May 15, 1970
- Running time: 91 minutes
- Country: United States
- Language: English

The Delta Factor is a 1970 American crime adventure film, co-produced and directed by Tay Garnett who co-wrote the screenplay with Raoul Walsh. It stars Christopher George and Yvette Mimieux. The film is based on the 1967 novel by Mickey Spillane.

== Plot ==
A glamorous CIA agent, Kim Stacy, gets a new assignment. She is to work with a man named Morgan, a convict serving time for the theft of $40 million that was never recovered.

Morgan is given a chance to earn a reduced sentence by aiding in the rescue of a scientist who has been taken prisoner on a Caribbean isle. Morgan infiltrates the fortress by posing as a drug dealer. He discovers hundreds of political prisoners being held there. He also encounters Dekker, an old war comrade who stole the $40 million and framed Morgan for the crime.

Dekker is about to flee the island with Kim held at gunpoint. Morgan shoots him and boards the plane, which he and Kim fly to safety. But with her consent, grateful for Morgan's having saved her life, Kim permits him to bail out by parachute so that he can go find the $40 million.

== Cast ==
- Christopher George as Morgan
- Yvette Mimieux as Kim Stacy
- Diane McBain as Lisa
- Ralph Taeger as Keefer
- Yvonne De Carlo as Valerie
- Joseph Sirola as Sal Dekker
