= My Science Project =

1985 American science fiction film

- Theatrical release poster
- Directed by: Jonathan R. Betuel
- Written by: Jonathan R. Betuel
- Produced by: Jonathan Taplin
- Starring: John Stockwell; Danielle von Zerneck; Fisher Stevens; Raphael Sbarge; Richard Masur; Barry Corbin; Ann Wedgeworth; Dennis Hopper
- Cinematography: David M. Walsh
- Edited by: Carroll Timothy O'Meara
- Music by: Peter Bernstein
- Production companies: Touchstone Films; Silver Screen Partners II
- Distributed by: Buena Vista Distribution Co.
- Release date: August 9, 1985
- Running time: 94 minutes
- Country: United States
- Language: English
- Budget: $10 million
- Box office: $4,122,748

My Science Project is a 1985 American teen science fiction comedy film directed by Jonathan R. Betuel. It followed on the heels of other teen sci-fi/comedy films released the same year, such as Back to the Future, Real Genius, and Weird Science; it did not perform as well as those films.

== Plot ==
In 1957, the United States military secures a crashed UFO in a hangar bay. President Dwight D. Eisenhower enters to see the craft and simply orders his men to "get rid of it".

In 1985, a high school senior named Michael Harlan, whose only interest is muscle cars, reluctantly searches for something to turn in for his science class project final. While on what his bookworm friend Ellie Sawyer thinks is a date, Michael breaks into a government aircraft boneyard and stumbles upon a hidden fallout shelter. There, he finds a glowing, plasma globe-like piece of scientific equipment and grabs it just as a military guard approaches and chases him away.

The next day, Michael cleans up the device in auto shop class and unwittingly activates it, causing it to leech power from a nearby boombox. His friend, Vince Latello, tries to talk him out of attaching the device to an automotive battery, whereupon the device emits a swirl of colorful energy that manifests into an Ancient Greek vase as the battery melts. The two leave the auto shop for their next class, but soon realize they inexplicably lost two hours of time and missed their final science exam.

After more strange occurrences with the machine, Michael takes the device, referred to as "the gizmo", to his ex-hippie science teacher Dr. Bob Roberts. Believing it is a portal to another dimension, he plugs it into an electrical outlet. While bathing in the cosmic energy of the gizmo and contemplating the wonders of the universe, Roberts suddenly disappears, leaving behind his peace symbol medallion. Michael is unable to disconnect the machine from the outlet and decides his only solution is to destroy the power lines leading to town.

Michael and Vince obtain dynamite from the backroom of a hardware store owned by Michael's father, and race to outrun a wave of energy traveling along the lines before it reaches the local power plant. They blow up a tower, stopping the wave and causing a blackout, but upon returning to town are arrested for Dr. Roberts' disappearance. Michael calls Ellie and asks her to go to the school to retrieve the gizmo, hoping to prove his innocence by showing it to the police. At the school, she runs into Sherman, an obnoxious nerd, who hooks the gizmo up to the outlet again, creating a massive time warp over the school and causing a blackout in town, allowing Vince and Michael to escape the police. Returning to the school, they find the whole building consumed in a vortex of space/time as objects and people from the past and future manifest around them and a crazed Sherman, who fears the world is ending and tells them that Ellie is in danger.

Dragging Sherman along, Mike and Vince grab weapons from a platoon of fallen Vietnam War soldiers and make their way to the science lab, battling a Tyrannosaurus in the gymnasium and a mob of post-apocalyptic mutants along the way. They reach Ellie and successfully deactivate the gizmo, causing time to return to normal just as emergency crews and police show up. Moments later, Dr. Roberts reappears (dressed in Hopper's Easy Rider costume with fringe leather jacket, bush hat, moustache), rejoicing in an unexpected trip to Woodstock, and proudly gives Michael an "A" grade on his science project under the condition that he gets rid of the machine, saying "The world is not ready for space and time." Roberts is then arrested by the local sheriff, who thinks he blew up the power lines - as Michael had accidentally left Roberts' peace medallion at the hardware store.

As promised, Michael returns the gizmo back to the junkyard where he found it. On the way back, the car runs out of gas and he and Ellie leave it by the side of the road; in contrast to his previous devotion to it, he says "It's just a car."

== Cast ==
- John Stockwell as Michael Harlan
- Danielle von Zerneck as Ellie Sawyer
- Fisher Stevens as Vince Latello
- Raphael Sbarge as Sherman
- Richard Masur as Detective Isador Nulty
- Barry Corbin as Lew Harlan
- Ann Wedgeworth as Dolores
- Dennis Hopper as Bob Roberts
- Candace Silvers as Irene
- Beau Dremann as Matusky
- Pat Simmons as Crystal
- John Vidor as Jock #1
- Vincent Barbour as Jock #2
- Jaime Alba as Jock #3

== Music ==
The film features four original songs. "My Science Project" is the film's theme song and plays over the final credits. The song was written by Bob Held, Michael Colina, and Bill Heller. It was performed by The Tubes. Other original songs include the following:

- "Hard to Believe" (words and music by Bob Held, Bill Heller, and Matthew Hill; performed by The Tubes)
- "Hit and Run" (words and music by Jeff Gordon, Bob Held, and Bill Heller; performed by David Johansen)
- "My Mind's Made Up" (words and music by Bob Held and Bill Heller; performed by Steve Johnstad)

In addition to original songs, the film also included "The "Fish" Cheer/I-Feel-Like-I'm-Fixin'-to-Die Rag" performed by Country Joe and The Fish, as well as "The Warrior" performed by Scandal.

Intrada Records released a special edition of the film's soundtrack on November 13, 2014. The CD features the film's original remastered score, as well as the end title song, "My Science Project".

== Production ==
My Science Project was produced under the Touchstone Pictures banner of Walt Disney Productions and was therefore free to contain more adult themes than Disney-branded fare. In an interview with Starlog magazine, actor Fisher Stevens said he believed himself to be the first actor to utter the word "fuck" in a Disney film ("It's God-fucking-zilla!").

== Reception ==
The film holds a rating of 11% on Rotten Tomatoes, based on 9 reviews. New York Times critic Stephen Holden wrote on August 10, 1985; "My Science Project is a cheerful teen-age adventure film that in its snappier moments resembles a far less clever and less expensive Back to the Future. Despite a plot that has few interesting twists and a shoestring budget, the film glimmers with moments of drollery."

=== Box office ===
The film was not a success. On its first weekend, it only peaked at #14 with $1,504,118, averaging $1,499 per theater. It ended grossing $4,122,748 in domestic box-office in its two-week run.

== Home media ==
The film was first released on VHS, Betamax, and LaserDisc on January 8, 1986. The film was rereleased on VHS and DVD by Anchor Bay Entertainment on May 18, 1999, and rereleased on November 26, 2002, with the 2002 DVD release only having a Fullscreen presentation, and again by Touchstone Home Video on February 3, 2004. The film was released on Blu-ray disc by Mill Creek Entertainment on February 16, 2016, and again by Kino Lorber on December 8, 2020. On the same day, Kino Lorber also re-released the film on DVD.

== See also ==
- List of films featuring dinosaurs
