= David Wallace (American actor) =

American actor (born 1958)

- Born: November 23, 1958 (age 67); Miami, Florida, U.S.
- Status: Retired
- Other name: David Wysocki
- Years active: 1979 - 2005
- Spouse(s): Lisa Trusel (1986 - present) 4 children

David Wallace (born November 23, 1958) is an American actor.

== Personal life ==
Wallace was born in Miami, Florida.

Wallace has been married to actress Lisa Trusel since 1986. They met on Days of Our Lives. They have 4 children: Ryan Elizabeth, Benjamin, Emma, and Joseph.

== Career ==
His first television role was in the 1980 television movie The Babysitter with Stephanie Zimbalist and William Shatner. Wallace starred on the serials Days of Our Lives as Todd Chandler from 1985 to 1986, and General Hospital as Dr. Tom Hardy from 1987 to 1993.

The first feature film he starred in was the 1983 comedy Money to Burn; he appeared in the 1982 horror movie Humongous as Eric Simmons and starred in the 1983 horror movie Mortuary.

He has made guest appearances on television series such as Vega$, The Facts of Life, Diff'rent Strokes, The Powers of Matthew Star, Hart to Hart, Matt Houston, Hotel, JAG and The Young and the Restless.

He also works as an electrical engineer.

== Filmography ==
- 1979 The Misadventures of Sheriff Lobo as Bellboy (2 episodes)
- 1980 The Babysitter as Scotty
- 1981 The Five of Me as Unknown (uncredited)
- 1981 Vega$ as Tommy (1 episode)
- 1981 Miracle on Ice as Bill Baker
- 1981-1985 The Facts of Life as Morgan Wilson (2 episodes)
- 1982 Mazes and Monsters as Daniel
- 1982 The Powers of Matthew Star as Jerry (1 episode)
- 1982 Split Image as Gymnast
- 1982 Humongous as Eric Simmons
- 1982 Diff'rent Strokes as Jeff (1 episode)
- 1983 Mortuary as Greg Stevens
- 1983 Money to Burn as Teddy
- 1984 Matt Houston as Tommy / Emmett Allyson (2 episodes)
- 1984 Hart to Hart as Doug Templeton (1 episode)
- 1985-1986 Days of Our Lives as Todd Chandler #3 (unknown episodes)
- 1986-1987 Hotel as Brian Larson (6 episodes)
- 1987-1989 General Hospital as Dr. Tom Hardy Sr. #4 (unknown episodes)
- 1996 Joe & Joe as Unknown (as David Wysocki)
- 2002 JAG as Lt. Col. Peter Golding (1 episode)
- 2005 The Young and the Restless as Minister (1 episode)
