= The Immortal (1970 TV series) =

American television series (1970–1971)

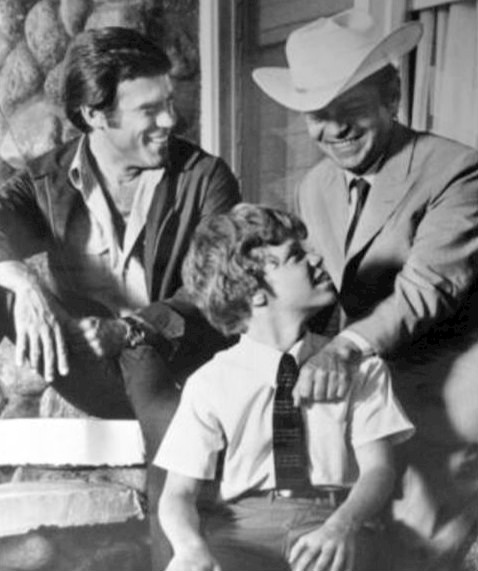
- Christopher George, Ross Martin and Mitch Vogel, 1970.
- Genre: Science fiction Drama
- Created by: Robert Specht
- Based on: The Immortals by James Gunn
- Starring: Christopher George; Don Knight; David Brian
- Music by: Dominic Frontiere
- Country of origin: United States
- No. of episodes: 15 + pilot

Production
- Executive producer: Anthony Wilson
- Producer: Howie Horwitz
- Running time: 60 minutes (including commercials)
- Production company: Paramount Television

Original release
- Network: ABC
- Release: September 24, 1970 – January 14, 1971

The Immortal is an American television series, starring Christopher George as a man whose blood chemistry and resistance to almost all diseases (including old age) makes him both almost immortal and a target of several wealthy men who would use him as a personal blood bank. It aired on ABC from September 24, 1970, to January 14, 1971. The series is based on a pilot film of the same name, which aired on September 30, 1969, as an ABC Movie of the Week. The plot is based on the 1964 science fiction novel The Immortals, by James Gunn.

The series music was composed by Dominic Frontiere, who is primarily known for scoring the sci-fi anthology series The Outer Limits. Although The Immortal was canceled at midseason, episodes were rerun by ABC in the summer of 1971. It was later rerun on the American Forces Network in Europe in the 1980s and on the Sci Fi Channel in the 1990s.

== Series overview ==
Ben Richards is a test car driver for a large corporation owned by billionaire Jordan Braddock. He is 43 years old, but looks young enough to pass for 30—and he has never been sick a day in his life. Ben's life changes when he donates a pint of blood. When Braddock, who is dying, is given a blood transfusion of his donated blood, and is brought back from the brink of death, Ben's physician, Dr. Matthew Pearce, determines that his O-negative blood contains all known antibodies and immunities. This gives Ben immunity to every known disease and an estimated lifespan five to ten times that of other humans, making him, in the doctor's words, "virtually immortal". The billionaire decides that he has to control Richards' life so he can access his life-saving blood.

When Richards rejects all of Braddock's offers to remain with him, the billionaire has him imprisoned, but he ultimately escapes. Richards tells his fiancée Sylvia Cartwright that they can never marry because she would also be imprisoned by Braddock (in the episode "Sylvia" Richards puts himself in danger to visit Cartwright at her wedding to another man). Richards is now on the run because when Braddock dies (shown in the flashback episode "To the Gods Alone" which resolved plot points between the pilot and the series), one of his former employees, Fletcher (who did not appear in the pilot), is hired by another billionaire, Arthur Maitland, who also wants access to Richards' blood.

The series' dramatic tension is based on the idea that Richards would probably never lose his life if he were to live quietly, since he would never succumb to any known diseases. But his flight from Fletcher puts his life at great risk, constantly engaging in dangerous efforts to avoid capture, and his "immortal" blood did not make him immune to losing his life from injury.

The series primarily focuses on Richards' journeys and the people he meets while trying to avoid Fletcher. A secondary plot involved Richards' search for a brother he has never known, with the implication that that brother may share his gift and thus be at risk from unscrupulous billionaires as well. Ben Richards is imprisoned by a young billionaire, Simon Brent, in an episode titled "The Queen's Gambit". In the episode "Man on a Punched Card" Maitland hires computer programmer Terry Kerwin to track and predict Richards' movements using a mainframe computer. Kerwin was played by Christopher George's real-life wife Lynda Day George, who would co-star on another Paramount TV series Mission: Impossible from 1971 to 1973.

The plotline of The Immortal is quite different from that of the book on which it is based (the protagonist of the book was a vagrant, not a test driver, who discovers his immortality when he sells his blood). Instead, The Immortal bears more than a superficial resemblance to the then-recent, very popular TV series, The Fugitive, which still aired in syndicated reruns. That series had ended its four-season run three years before The Immortal began. It is also the mirror of the series Run for Your Life about a man suffering from a terminal disease who wants to experience everything because he is going to die soon, while Richards has to run because he will live virtually forever. The Immortal was cancelled before a proper finale episode could be filmed.

== Cast ==
- Christopher George as Ben Richards
- Don Knight as Fletcher
- David Brian as Arthur Maitland
- Carol Lynley as Sylvia Cartwright
- Barry Sullivan as Jordan Braddock
- Jessica Walter as Janet Braddock
- Ralph Bellamy as Dr. Matthew Pearce
- Nico Minardos as Simon Brent
- Paul Frees Narrator

== Episodes ==
No.	Title	Directed by	Written by	Original release date
Film	"The Immortal"	Joseph Sargent	Robert Specht	September 30, 1969
Ben Richards is a race driver with unique blood, which makes him immune to all known diseases, even old age. When a dying billionaire discovers Ben's secret, he is determined to keep himself alive. Note: 90-minute television film.
1	"Sylvia"	Don McDougall	Robert Malcolm Young	September 24, 1970
Fletcher hopes the recent engagement of Ben's one-time fiancée will lead to his capture.
2	"White Elephants Don't Grow on Trees"	Michael Caffey	Shimon Wincelberg	October 1, 1970
Ben aids a down-on-his-luck salvage dealer delivering toxic gas canisters.
3	"Reflections on a Lost Tomorrow"	Leslie H. Martinson	Robert Hamner	October 8, 1970
In a bid to help himself, Ben gets a job with a doctor studying blood and longevity.
4	"The Legacy"	Robert Douglas	Bob & Wanda Duncan	October 15, 1970
Ben helps a group of Mexican Americans working in an illegal mining camp, many of whom are suffering from typhoid fever.
5	"The Rainbow Butcher"	Nicholas Webster	Jack Turley	October 22, 1970
Ben finds himself arrested on a trumped-up traffic charge by a crooked sheriff.
6	"Man on a Punched Card"	Don Weis	Shimon Wincelberg	October 29, 1970
Fletcher hires computer programmers to track Ben's moves and ultimately capture him.
7	"White Horse, Steel Horse"	Leslie H. Martinson	T : Stephen Kandel; S/T : Gene L. Coon	November 5, 1970
Ben is charged with the murder of a rancher who refuses to pay his hired hands fair wages.
8	"The Queen's Gambit"	Robert Douglas	Stephen Kandel	November 12, 1970
Tricked by a woman feigning car trouble, Ben finds himself captured by a ruthless young billionaire.
9	"By Gift of Chance"	Irving J. Moore	Ken Trevey	November 19, 1970
A foreman on a farm deliberately poisons his workers with pesticide, one of them Ben's friend.
10	"Dead Man, Dead Man"	Allen Baron	William Wood	December 3, 1970
Ben assumes a dead man's identity, but must still jump through many hoops to avoid Fletcher's clutches.
11	"Paradise Bay"	Don Weis	S : Dan Ullman; T : Stephen Kandel; S/T : Ben Masselink	December 10, 1970
Ben searches for his brother in an old, decaying beach town that is slated for corporate development.
12	"The Return"	Michael Caffey	Robert Specht	December 17, 1970
Ben tries to help a childhood friend who will face murder charges if an injured man dies.
13	"To the Gods Alone"	Leslie H. Martinson	Ken Trevey	December 31, 1970
With Ben trapped by Fletcher, the two recall a mutual acquaintance.
14	"Sanctuary"	Michael Caffey	William Eastlake	January 7, 1971
After escaping from Fletcher, Ben seeks cover on an Indian reservation.
15	"My Brother's Keeper"	Charles Rondeau	T : Stephen Kandel; S/T : Bob & Wanda Duncan	January 14, 1971
Ben thinks he may have found his brother. Note: Final episode of series.

== DVD release ==
On October 16, 2017, it was announced that Visual Entertainment Inc. had acquired the rights to the series. They subsequently released The Immortal - 'The Complete Collection' on DVD in Region 1 on November 9, 2017.

== See also ==
- Immortality in fiction
