= Christopher George =

American actor (1931–1983)

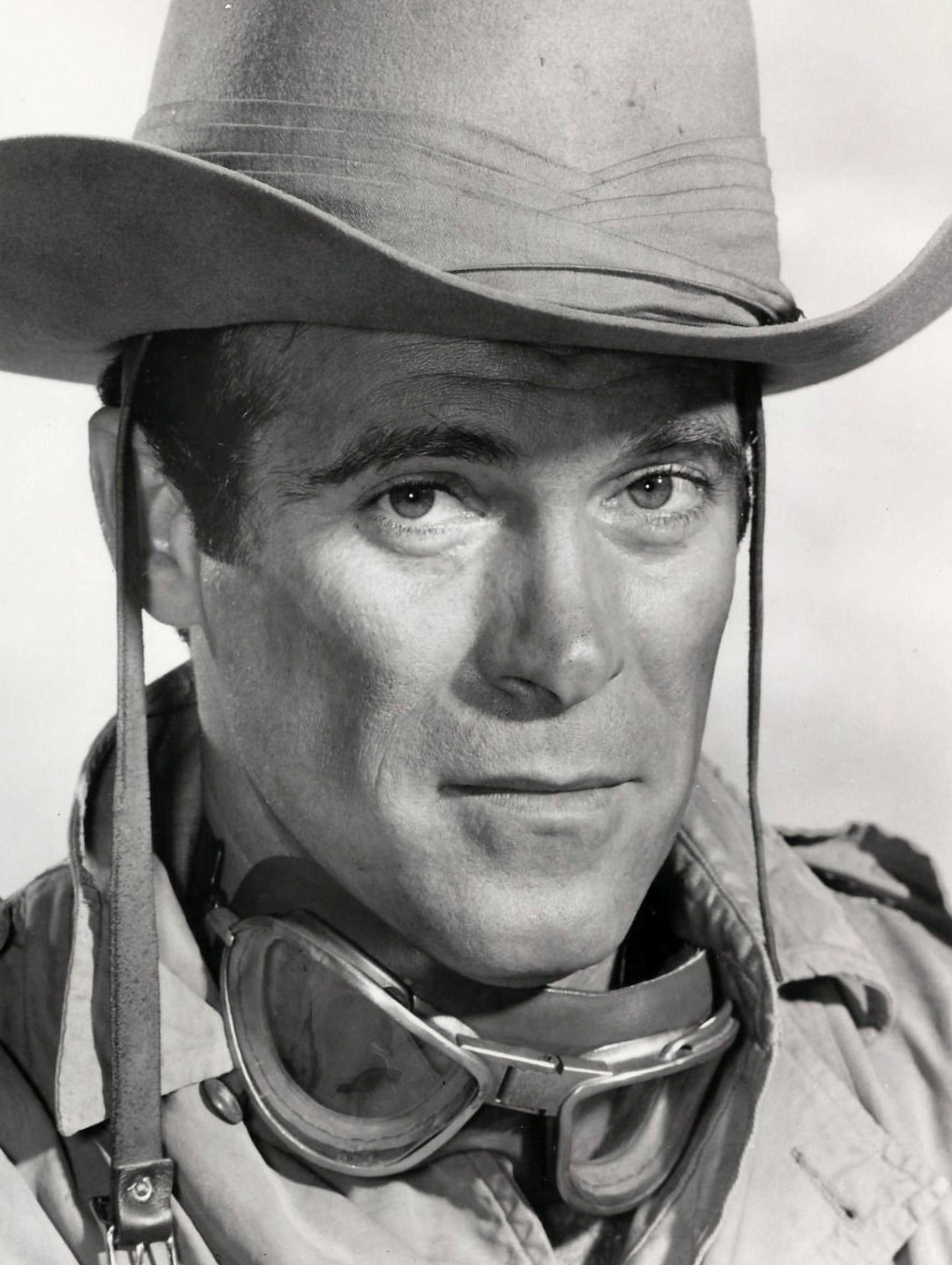
- As Sgt. Troy in The Rat Patrol, 1967
- Born: Christopher John George; February 25, 1931; Royal Oak, Michigan, U.S.
- Died: November 28, 1983 (aged 52); Los Angeles, California, U.S.
- Occupation: Actor
- Years active: 1965–1983
- Spouse: Lynda Day George (m. 1970)
- Children: 2

Christopher John George (February 25, 1931 – November 28, 1983) was an American television and film actor who starred in the 1960s television series The Rat Patrol. He was nominated for a Golden Globe Award in 1967 as Best TV Star for his performance in the series. He was also the recipient of a New York Film Festival award as the Best Actor in a Television Commercial. George was married to actress Lynda Day George.

== Early life ==
Christopher George was born in Royal Oak, Michigan, on February 25, 1931, the son of Greek immigrants John George originally Georgiou (Greek: Ιωάννης Γεωργίου) and Vaseleke (Vassiliki) George (Greek: Βασιλική Γεωργίου). His father was born in Thebes and his mother in Athens.

George did not speak English until he was six years old, because his family only spoke Greek at home. His father was a traveling salesman during his childhood. He accompanied his father on selling trips to cities such as Akron, New York City, Chicago, St. Louis, Memphis, and Detroit.

From Michigan, the family moved to Mountain Lakes, New Jersey. Once he began learning to speak English, his father enrolled him in Greek school in addition to his regular school so that he would not forget the Greek language. That was where George first became interested in acting; at Greek school they performed Greek plays and recited Greek poetry.

When he was 14, he and his family moved to Miami, Florida. As a child, he lived in the Coconut Grove section of Miami and attended Shenandoah Elementary School and Miami Senior High School. In school, he played soccer, football and baseball and ran track. While in Florida, he used to hunt for alligators in the Everglades. After obtaining his driver's license, he worked for his father, driving trucks between Miami and other cities along the Eastern Seaboard.

When he was young, George felt bound to become a priest in the Greek Orthodox Church, and his family prepared him for it; his brother Nick said that all through his childhood, Christopher was an altar boy and a choir boy and that his parents and the priest were trying to groom him to become a priest. He served as an altar boy at St. Sophia Greek Orthodox Cathedral in Miami.

== Military service ==
George enlisted in the United States Marine Corps (USMC) on October 13, 1948, at Jacksonville, Florida, at age 17. He lied about his age on his recruitment form by giving his year of birth as 1929, which then stuck with him for most of his adult life. He attributed his enlistment to being inspired by John Wayne, saying, "You know, he caused the enlistment of hundreds of kids in the Marines and I was one of them." According to his military record at the National Personnel Records Center, he attended boot camp at Marine Corps Recruit Depot Parris Island, South Carolina, and graduated with a meritorious promotion to private first class on December 31, 1948.

His first duty station was Headquarters Squadron, Marine Corps Air Station Quantico, Virginia. In April 1950, he transferred to Aircraft Engineering Squadron 12 (AES-12), also located at Quantico. AES-12 maintained the aircraft for school pilots and also used them as a demonstration squadron for members of the United States Congress, demonstrating new rockets and bombs. While assigned to AES-12, he rose to the rank of sergeant. He had forced landings in airplanes while he was in the Marines, and while stationed at Quantico, was very sick, lying in the hospital with "a 110-degree fever."

While stationed at Quantico, George was a passenger in an aircraft flown by one of AES-12's officers. The weather was clear and sunny that day when both of the engines failed around 8,000 feet (2,400 m) above the Carolinas. Both pilots worked to get the engines restarted, dipping to an altitude around 1,000 feet (300 m) before they succeeded. Another time, an aircraft caught fire; he had to bail out, in the first parachute jump of his life.

During the Korean War, George commanded a USMC crash boat, and served as gunner aboard the type of rescue aircraft used to fly wounded out of Korea. He completed a three-year enlistment with the USMC and stayed for an additional year, before requesting an honorable discharge and returning home to Miami. He left active service on August 29, 1952.

After that, as a sergeant in the Marine Corps Reserves, he joined Marine Fighter Squadron 142 of the Marine Air Reserve Training Command, Marine Corps Air Station Miami, Florida. He also served in the 4th Supply Company, in Stockton, California. Finally, he reverted to inactive reserve status and was assigned to Headquarters, 6th Marine Corps Reserve and Recruiting District), Atlanta, Georgia, until completing his enlisted service and receiving a discharge on September 3, 1956.

While in the Marine Corps, his superior officers encouraged him to apply for flight school and a commission; instead, he chose to receive a discharge so he could return to school. He passed a high-school equivalency examination.

During the summer of 1976, he appeared in a recruiting film made for the Marine Corps Air Reserve. On May 5, 2009, the USMC flew a flag over the Iwo Jima Memorial in honor of his service in the Corps.

=== Military awards ===
George earned the Marine Corps Good Conduct Medal and the National Defense Service Medal. These awards are documented in his official military personnel file available at the National Archives and Records Administration.

== University education ==
After completing his enlistment, George attended the University of Miami from 1953 to 1958, where he earned a bachelor's degree in business administration from the school of business. He was a member of Sigma Phi Epsilon, along with his brother Nick, who also attended the University of Miami.

== Nonacting jobs ==
George held down a variety of jobs before he began acting for a living, including working as a private investigator and as a bartender in a Miami bar. He owned and operated eateries and beer bars, one called the Dragnet Drive-In in Miami and another in Stockton, California. The inn in Stockton where he worked for five months during a break from college had been owned by his late uncle for seven years and was off-limits to Marines. He held black belts in karate and judo. He worked as a bouncer in tough restaurants and held a pilot's license.

George was hired by a friend who owned a 110-foot converted Canadian gunboat and transported cargo through the Caribbean for two years. Before graduating from the University of Miami, he had a job lined up with a big investment company, but he instead turned to acting after completing a vocational test battery that indicated that he should work in drama.

== Acting career ==
After graduating from college, George began acting in New York City, where he performed on the stage and in television commercials. His big break came when he was working as a bouncer at a New York waterfront bar, and producer Robert Rafelson convinced him to begin an acting career. He studied acting under Wynn Handman and landed roles in off-Broadway theatre productions of popular plays of the day. Small theater productions in which he appeared while he was studying drama include: All My Sons, The Moon Is Blue, Cat on a Hot Tin Roof, Stalag 17, and Who's Afraid of Virginia Woolf? Under drama coach Wynn Handman, he landed a 16-week engagement in the play Mr. Roberts with actor Hugh O'Brian; parts in Shakespeare and Tennessee Williams works followed.

His career took off after he made a 60-second TV commercial for shaving cream, where he played the young man in the "Good morning, Mr. Gray" shaving spot, and won the New York Film Festival Award for best actor in a commercial. During this 1962 shaving-cream commercial, George played a groom lathering up before his first honeymoon night, with a line where he said, "It's all for you." The commercial earned him over $30,000. He also appeared in roles on the television series Naked City and Bewitched. While in New York City, George played in the Lemos Greek Repertory Theater because he could speak Greek fluently.

He first appeared on the screen when he landed a role in the film In Harm's Way (1965), playing a dying sailor for 30 seconds. This gave him his first opportunity to meet and work with John Wayne, who had been his boyhood idol and who would become a lifelong friend. He first rose to prominence playing a supporting role in the Howard Hawks-directed Western film El Dorado (1966, released in 1967), also for Paramount Pictures starring both John Wayne and Robert Mitchum in the lead roles. George and Wayne became friends while shooting the film and would co-star in additional Westerns, including Chisum (1970) and The Train Robbers (1973). George had the lead in William Castle's spy-fi Project X released in 1968.

=== The Rat Patrol ===
From 1966 to 1968 over the course of two seasons and 58 episodes, George played the lead role of Sergeant Sam Troy on The Rat Patrol. The television series followed the exploits of four Allied soldiers who were part of a long-range desert patrol group in the North African campaign during World War II. Along with fellow Rat Patrol members, he appeared in the April 1967 Cherry Blossom Festival and Parade in Washington, DC. While starring in The Rat Patrol, Chris also served as an awards presenter at the 1966 Washington, DC, local version of the Emmy Awards, hosted at the Washington, DC, Sheraton Park Hotel.

While filming a scene on January 4, 1967, George, as well as fellow cast members Justin Tarr and Gary Raymond, were injured when the Jeep Tarr was driving overturned on a dry lakebed at Rosamond, California, as they made a tight turn. George sustained a concussion, tore something in his neck, and injured his back. Doctors at Cedars-Sinai Medical Center in California were able to determine that his back had been badly sprained, not fractured, as they had initially feared.

=== USO Tour in 1967 ===
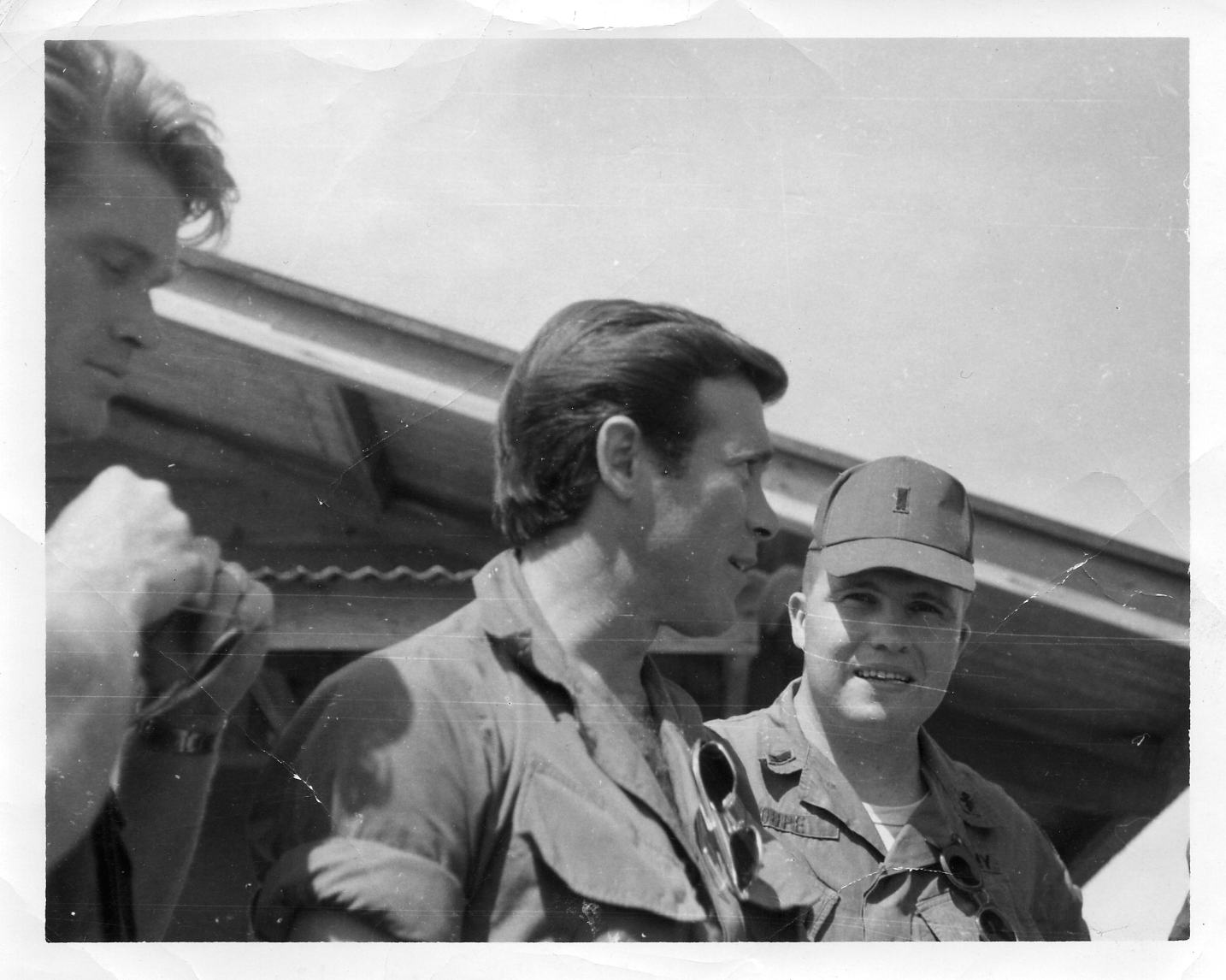
Christopher George is with fellow Rat Patrol actor Lawrence Casey and Second Lieutenant David Coupe, U.S. Army Signal Corps, at III Corps Headquarters, Bien Hoa, South Vietnam, in December 1967.

George also joined actor Lawrence P. Casey on a USO tour of Vietnam, Japan, and Thailand, which lasted for almost a month, starting on November 12, 1967 and going into December 1967.

During the tour of Vietnam, he visited III Corps Headquarters at Bien Hoa Army Base and used the III Corps signal switchboard to place a telephone call to his girlfriend and future wife, Lynda Day. While in Vietnam, he did not confine himself to the rear echelon, but instead pressed his escorts to allow him to go as far out into the field as they would permit; at one time, they were even pinned down by the Viet Cong.

In November 1967, the USO and the Air Force sent several other Hollywood celebrities and him to visit a military hospital in San Antonio, where military personnel returning from Vietnam with serious burns were being treated. The visit, to Brooke Army Medical Center, was arranged by Johnny Grant, a Hollywood radio personality who had taken troupes of performers to Vietnam; during the visit, George and some of the actresses, including Lynda Day, spent over an hour with a wounded veteran who had been previously uncommunicative and got him to talk.

=== After The Rat Patrol ===
Following the cancellation of The Rat Patrol, George played the lead role in several genre films of the 1960s, including Tiger by the Tail (1968, released in 1970) co-starring Tippi Hedren, The Devil's 8 (1969) co-starring Fabian, and Mickey Spillane's The Delta Factor (1970), directed by Tay Garnett, who co-wrote the film with Raoul Walsh. He narrated a documentary about the careers of Lee and Craig Breedlove, a husband-and-wife auto racing team, The Racers: Craig and Lee Breedlove (1968).

In 1969-70, George made three television pilots; Lynda Day George said he was the only actor who sold all of his pilots, one became a 1971 TV movie Escape. Producer Bruce Lansbury later produced The Magician.

In September 1969, he portrayed Ben Richards in the television pilot movie for The Immortal, which ran on the ABC Movie of the Week. The pilot is based on the science-fiction novel The Immortals by James Gunn. The film was picked up as a television series and ran for 15 episodes from 1970 to 1971. Although the series was cancelled midseason, episodes were rerun by ABC in the summer of 1971. It was later shown in reruns on the Syfy channel.

During this time, he played Dan August in the television film House on Greenapple Road (1970), which evolved into the television series Dan August starring Burt Reynolds. In addition, he starred in an unsold series pilot, Escape, with Avery Schreiber and Huntz Hall, which ABC released in 1971 as a television movie. In it, he portrayed Robin Hood–like escapologist and nightclub owner Cameron Steele.

He continued his television work throughout the 1970s with guest roles on many popular series, including Owen Marshall: Counselor at Law, Police Story, S.W.A.T., Charlie's Angels, and Fantasy Island. In 1973, he starred opposite Jim Brown in I Escaped from Devil's Island. He also surprised fans by posing nude for Playgirl magazine in the June 1974 issue. In 1976, he played a supporting role as Lieutenant Commander Wade McClusky in the all-star World War II epic Midway. That same year, he played the lead role of Ranger Michael Kelly in the Film Ventures International independent film Grizzly. A thinly veiled Jaws clone, the killer animal horror/thriller film became one of the most popular films of George's career, earning more than $39 million at the box office.

He followed that success with a busy string of horror, action, splatter, and slasher B movies over the next seven years, including Dixie Dynamite (1976) co-starring Warren Oates, Day of the Animals (1977), City of the Living Dead (1980), Graduation Day (1981), Enter the Ninja (1981), Pieces (1982), and Mortuary (1983).

=== Recruiting film for the USMC Reserve ===
In the summer of 1976, prior to returning to MCAS Quantico for a visit, George traveled to Andrews Air Force Base in Maryland to appear in a recruiting video for the U.S. Marine Corps Air Reserves. This video featured Marines assigned to Marine Fighter Attack Squadron 321 just returned from their annual training tour as reservists. The commander of the unit at the time was Lt. Col. Charles McLeran. It was filmed by the J. Walter Thompson advertising company and provided to recruiters in 1978. Archive records show that George was under contract with J. Walter Thompson for this work.

=== Work with his wife ===
George co-starred with his wife Lynda (who became Lynda Day George following their marriage) in multiple television films, including Mayday at 40,000 Feet! (1976) and Cruise Into Terror (1978). They also worked together in episodes of The F.B.I. (1970), Mission: Impossible (1971), McCloud (1975), Wonder Woman (1976), Love Boat (1977), Vega$ (1978), and Christopher George's regular series The Immortal (1970). In addition, the Georges co-starred in the feature film, Day Of The Animals (1977). The many co-star roles came about because they had the same agent, who was aware that they enjoyed working with one another.

One of his last film roles was a supporting role in the horror film Mortuary. Though George died on November 28, 1983, just two months after Mortuary was released in September 1983, it was actually filmed in 1981, more than two years prior to his death.

== Personal life ==
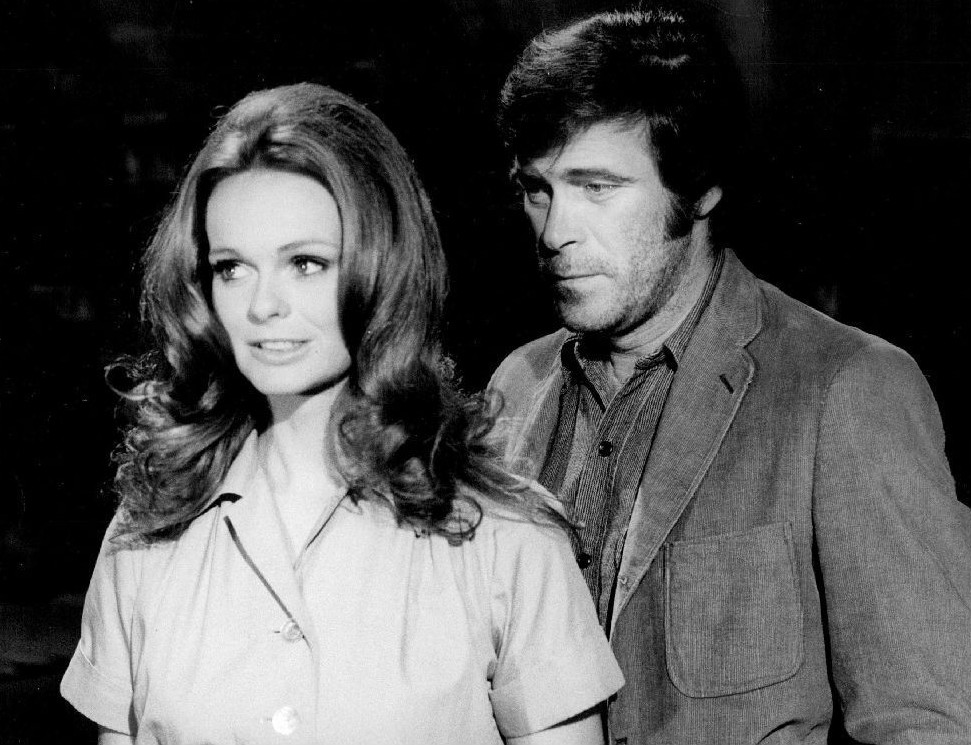
Christopher George and Lynda Day George were on Mission: Impossible in 1971.

George first met actress Lynda Day in New York City, where they were doing a fashion layout; she was modeling the bride's outfit and he was the groom. They met again later and became friends when they starred together in the independent film The Gentle Rain (1966). They appeared in supporting roles together four years later in Chisum starring John Wayne, where they fell in love. On May 15, 1970, they were married in an Episcopal ceremony in a judge's chamber in Palm Beach, Florida. They had two children together — a daughter, Casey, and a son, Nicholas. Nicholas was the child of Lynda and her first husband, Joseph Pantano, but the Georges successfully petitioned courts to have Nicholas recognized as Christopher's natural son.

George's niece is Wheel of Fortune hostess Vanna White. According to White, although George was not a biological relation of hers, her mother grew up with his family, and years later in Los Angeles, his wife and he took her under their wing.

== Death ==
George died of a heart attack at age 52 in the late evening of November 28, 1983, at Westside Hospital in Los Angeles. After dinner at home with his wife, he felt sudden chest pains and was taken by ambulance to the hospital. He later went into cardiac arrest and was pronounced dead at 10:35 pm, over three hours after he was admitted, while under the care and observation of his cardiologist, Dr. Pearl McBroom.

Although several sources in the last two decades cite his Rat Patrol injuries as a contributing factor to his death, George was a frequent smoker of cigars, a heavy drinker, had known heart disease, and had undergone coronary bypass surgery about five years prior to his death.

A Greek Orthodox mnemósynon (Greek: μνημόσυνον) service was conducted at Westwood Memorial Park, and a private funeral was held at Saint Nicholas Greek Orthodox Church in Northridge on December 1.

On May 5, 2009, the USMC flew a flag over the Iwo Jima Memorial in honor of his service in the Corps.

== Filmography ==
=== Film ===
Year	Title	Role	Notes
1965	In Harm's Way	Sailor	Uncredited
1966	The Gentle Rain	Bill Patterson	
1967	El Dorado	Nelsen McLeod	Filmed in 1966
1968	Project X	Hagan Arnold	
1968	Massacre Harbor	Sergeant Sam Troy	Feature film consisting of three Rat Patrol episodes
1968	Gavilan	Gavilan	Also known as Ballad of Gavilan
1968	Bandolero!	Mrs. Stoner's wagon driver	Uncredited
1969	The Thousand Plane Raid	Col. Greg Brandon	
1969	The Devil's 8	Ray Faulkner	
1970	Tiger by the Tail	Steve Michaelis	Filmed in 1968
1970	The Delta Factor	Morgan	
1970	Chisum	Dan Nodeen	
1973	The Train Robbers	Calhoun James	
1973	Bad Charleston Charlie	Lawyer	Uncredited
1973	I Escaped from Devil's Island	Davert	
1973	Pushing Up Daisies	Gas Station Attendant	Uncredited
1974	The Inbreaker	Roy MacRae	
1976	Grizzly	Ranger Michael Kelly	
1976	Dixie Dynamite	Sheriff Phil Marsh	
1976	Midway	Lieutenant Commander C. Wade McClusky	
1977	Day of the Animals	Steve Buckner	
1977	Whiskey Mountain	Bill	
1978	Questo si che è amore	Mike	
1980	The Exterminator	Detective James Dalton	
1980	City of the Living Dead	Peter Bell	Alternative title: The Gates of Hell; Italian title: Paura nella città dei morti viventi
1981	Graduation Day	Coach George Michaels	
1981	Enter the Ninja	Charles Venarius	
1982	Angkor: Cambodia Express	MacArthur	
1982	Pieces	Lt. Bracken	Spanish title: Mil gritos tiene la noche
1983	Mortuary	Hank Andrews	Filmed in 1981

=== Television ===
Year	Title	Role	Notes
1965	Bewitched	George	Episode: "George the Warlock"
1966	Thirteen Against Fate	Domb	Episode: "The Lodger"
1966-68	The Rat Patrol	Sgt. Sam Troy	58 episodes
1970-71	The Immortal	Ben Richards	16 episodes
1970	House on Greenapple Road	Lt. Dan August	TV film
1970	The F.B.I.	Peter Joseph Tenny	Episode: "Return to Power"
1971	Escape	Cameron Steele	TV film
1971	Mission: Impossible	Wendell Hoyes	Episode: "Nerves"
1971	Dead Men Tell No Tales	Larry Towers / Vic Jacobi	TV film
1971-73	Love, American Style	Peter / Chuck	2 episodes
1972	Man on a String	Lieutenant Pete King	TV film
1972	The Heist	Joe Craddock	TV film
1974	The Wide World of Mystery		Episode: "A Beautiful Killing"
1974	Owen Marshall, Counselor at Law	Cromwell	Episode: "The Break In"
1974	Thriller	Bernard Peel	Episode: "The Next Scream You Hear" (US title: "Not Guilty!")
1974-75	Police Story	Lt. Dutch Bennett / Doug Rollins	2 episodes
1975	McCloud	Vincent Burns	Episode: "Sharks!"
1975	The Last Survivors	Duane Jeffreys	TV film
1975	S.W.A.T.	Harry / Bravo	3 episodes
1976	Wonder Woman	Rojak	Episode: "Fausta, the Nazi Wonder Woman"
1976	Mayday at 40,000 Feet!	Stan Burkhart	TV film
1978	Cruise Into Terror	Neal Barry	TV film
1978	Vega$	Nicky Trent	Episode: "Serve, Volley and Kill"
1978-79	The Love Boat	Ross Randall / Bud Pomeroy / Bill Wainwright	4 episodes
1978-82	Fantasy Island	William Lowell / Dr. Greg Miller / Joe Beck / Jack Kincaid	4 episodes
1979	Charlie's Angels	Chadway	Episode: "Terror on Skis"
1979	The Misadventures of Sheriff Lobo	Dandy Jim Brody	Episode: "The Day That Shark Ate Lobo"
