= Ariane Rinehart =

American actress and singer

- Born: Ariane Elise Rinehart; April 13, 1994 (age 32); St. Louis, Missouri, U.S.
- Education: Barnard College (BA)
- Occupations: Actress, singer
- Years active: 2011–present

Ariane Rinehart (born April 13, 1994) is an American actress and singer. She is best known for her performance in The Sound of Music Live! as the eldest von Trapp daughter, Liesl, which was described by critics as the standout performance in the production.

== Early life and education ==
Rinehart was born to plastic surgeon Gregory Rinehart and illustrator Nadine Sokol Rinehart. Rinehart has an older brother, Ian. Rinehart started with ballet as an extra activity to do, but soon developed a love for it. She then started taking voice and acting lessons. Rinehart's first role was in Rodger and Hammerstein's Carousel.

Rinehart attended Lindbergh High School in St. Louis, Missouri, and earned a Bachelor of Arts degree from Barnard College, where she majored in sociology and minored in German.

== Career ==
When she was 10 years old, Rinehart starred as Marta, the second youngest von Trapp, in a professional production of the Sound of Music in St. Louis. This was a precursor to her second role in The Sound of Music in 2013, which was watched by 18 million people on NBC. It was the first full-scale musical made for TV and performed live since 1957.

As part of the promotion for The Sound of Music Live! she performed one of the songs live in the 2013 Macy's Thanksgiving Day Parade. Rinehart also reunited with the other Von Trapp children in December 2014 at 54 Below for a concert to promote the re-airing of The Sound of Music Live!. She has had several other film and television roles, and starred in the Justin Timberlake music video for the song "Mirrors". She appeared as Eve in the film Noah, released on March 28, 2014. In 2016, Rinehart appeared in episodes of Quantico and Blue Bloods, and 2017 in Law & Order: Special Victims Unit and What Would You Do?.

== Filmography ==
=== Film ===
Year	Title	Role	Notes
2014	Noah	Eve	
2015	Mi America	Teenage Kate	
2017	The Vanishing of Sidney Hall	Darcy	

=== Television ===
Year	Title	Role	Notes
2013	The Sound of Music Live!	Liesl von Trapp	Television special
2015	Eye Candy	Jessica	Episode: "YOLO"
2015	Quantico	Louisa	Episode: "Yes"
2016	Blue Bloods	Tara	Episode: "Personal Business"
2017	Law & Order: SVU	Sarah Morrissey	Episode: "Decline and Fall"
2017–2020	Chicago Fire	Lily	8 episodes
2018	Timberwood	Kira Montgomery	Episode: "Orientation"
2018	Christmas on Honeysuckle Lane	Rumi	Television film
2020	What Would You Do?	Various roles	3 episodes
