= Under the Boardwalk (1989 film) =

- Theatrical release poster
- Directed by: Fritz Kiersch
- Written by: Robert King
- Produced by: Gregory S. Blackwell; Steven H. Chanin
- Starring: Keith Coogan; Danielle von Zerneck; Roxana Zal
- Cinematography: Don Burgess
- Music by: David Kitay
- Distributed by: New World Pictures
- Release date: April 14, 1989
- Running time: 103 minutes
- Country: United States
- Language: English
- Box office: Domestic $147,542

Under the Boardwalk is a 1989 American teen romance/drama film directed by Fritz Kiersch and starring Keith Coogan and Danielle von Zerneck.

== Plot ==
It is the final weekend of summer and a group of Californian teenagers are looking forward to an upcoming surf contest. Rival gangs the Vals and the Lowks are confident that they will take home the trophy, but things become complicated when Reef Yorpin (Steve Monarque) - leader of the Lowks - discovers his sister Allie (Danielle von Zerneck) has fallen in love with Val surfer Nick (Richard Joseph Paul) after meeting at a beach party.

== Cast ==
- Keith Coogan as Andy
- Danielle von Zerneck as Allie
- Roxana Zal as Gitch

== See also ==
- List of American films of 1989
