= Mayday at 40,000 Feet! =

- Genre: Adventure; Crime; Drama
- Based on: Jet Stream by Austin Ferguson
- Written by: Austin Ferguson; Dick Nelson; Andrew J. Fenady
- Directed by: Robert Butler
- Starring: David Janssen; Don Meredith; Christopher George
- Music by: Richard Markowitz
- Country of origin: United States
- Original language: English

Production
- Producer: Andrew J. Fenady
- Production locations: Burbank, California; Los Angeles International Airport - 1 World Way, Los Angeles, California; O'Hare International Airport, Chicago, Illinois
- Cinematography: William B. Jurgensen
- Editor: Nick Archer
- Camera setup: Panavision Cameras and Lenses
- Running time: 93 minutes
- Production companies: Warner Bros. Television; Andrew J. Fenady Productions

Original release
- Network: CBS
- Release: November 12, 1976

Mayday at 40,000 Feet! (aka Panic in the Open Sky and Mayday: 40,000 ft!) is a 1976 American made-for-television drama film, directed by Robert Butler. The film stars David Janssen, Don Meredith and Christopher George, along with an all-star cast primarily playing the roles of passengers and crew aboard an airliner in crisis.

Robert Butler was "... one of the premium directors of series TV through four decades", although he also became a specialist in "one-off" television and film features. Mayday at 40,000 Feet! was an example of the 1970s "disaster" film, as well, it also very much fits the additional genre of the complex, heavily character-driven ensemble cast picture. The film explores the personal dramas and interactions that develop among the passengers and crew as they deal with a deadly onboard emergency.

== Plot ==
During a major snow storm, Transcon Airways Flight 602, Boeing 727 airliner piloted by Captain Pete Douglas, First Officer Stan Burkhart and Second Officer Mike Fuller on a flight from Los Angeles to New York, makes a scheduled stop in Salt Lake City. Greco, a two-time killer in the custody of Sam Riese, a Federal Marshal comes aboard. Among the passengers are Burkhart's girlfriend, nurse Susan McKenzie and Joseph Mannheim a disillusioned and possibly disgraced medical doctor drowning his problems with scotch. Captain Douglas has a family emergency that is making him anxious to return home as soon as possible.

After leaving Salt Lake City, the Federal Marshal suffers a fatal heart attack and his prisoner gets his gun. In the ensuing scuffle, Greco fires wildly, wounding the pilot and Susan McKenzie, as well as puncturing the hydraulic oil lines controlling all major systems on the airliner, including flaps and landing gear. Fuller tackles Greco and knocks him unconscious, disarming him and putting one of the passengers, an Army officer, in charge of the prisoner. While the remaining flight crew takes charge of the cockpit, head flight attendant Terry Dunlap with flight attendants Cathy Armello and Cindy Jensen, tend to the passengers.

A severe snowstorm has closed nearly all Midwestern airports, thus forcing the crippled aircraft with its badly wounded passengers to endure a three-hour flight to Chicago. The extended flight time puts the survival of the wounded pilot and passenger tended by Dr. Mannheim, in a precarious state and it is questionable whether the co-pilot and flight engineer will have sufficient control to land the aircraft safely. A crosswind makes the landing at Chicago extremely tricky and Burkhart and Fuller must wrestle with the controls to keep the 727 from veering off the runway. The pilots see the emergency vehicles off to the aircraft's right as they touch down on the runway with several hard bounces. As the 727 slows down, the pilots must continue their fight to keep the aircraft under control.

As the emergency vehicles approach the aircraft, Greco makes another escape attempt but is foiled by Burkhart who subdues him. Captain Douglas and Susan McKenzie are placed aboard ambulances and rushed to a Chicago hospital where Douglas finds out that his wife Kitty has been undergoing a breast cancer biopsy that has revealed a benign tumor. Dr. Manheim announces that Susan also will make a full recovery. With that news, Douglas and Burkhart are finally relieved.

== Cast ==
- David Janssen as Captain Pete Douglass
- Don Meredith as Mike Fuller
- Christopher George as Stan Burkhart
- Ray Milland as Dr. Joseph Mannheim
- Lynda Day George as Cathy Armello (Note: Lynda Day George was married to Christopher George.)
- Margaret Blye as Susan Mackenzie (credited as Maggie Blye)
- Marjoe Gortner as Greco
- Broderick Crawford as Marshal Sam Riese
- Tom Drake as Harry Jensen
- Christopher Norris as Cindy Jensen
- Hari Rhodes as Belson (credited as Harry Rhodes)
- Warren Vanders as Glen Meyer
- Shani Wallis as Terry Dunlap
- Jane Powell as Kitty Douglass
- William Bryant as Kent
- John Pickard as Wynberg
- Steven Marlo as Controller
- James Chandler as Doctor
- Philip Mansour as Surgeon (credited as Phillip Mansour)
- Al Molinaro as Forenzo
- Kathleen Bracken as Julia
- Bill Catching as Dowling
- Norland Benson as Jerry
- Philip Baker Hall as Reporter
- Bert Williams as Lars
- Buck Young as Guard
- William Harlow as 2nd Reporter (credited as Bill Harlow)
- Alan Foster as 3rd Reporter
- Gary McLarty as Carmichael

== Production ==
A Boeing 727-173 in fictional "Transcon Airways" livery was featured in both inflight and exterior views.

One of the ubiquitous Boeing 727-173Cs (c/n 19507/449, N693WA) leased from World Airways was painted in the fictional "Transcon Airways" livery and was extensively used in exterior aerial sequences in Mayday at 40,000 Feet!, matched with an interior set featuring the flight deck and passenger compartments. Airport scenes were filmed at the Los Angeles International Airport (LAX), where various air traffic control tower, terminals, runways and boarding areas were evident. Parts of the film were also shot in Salt Lake City. The final scenes were filmed at Chicago O'Hare International Airport (ORD).

Aviation film historian Christian Santoir considered Mayday at 40,000 Feet! an essentially accurate depiction of flying a Boeing 727 airliner, including the use of emergency systems. However, the film did contain significant technical errors.

- Captain Douglas is seen leaving his seat from the left side. That is not possible in a Boeing 727 cockpit.
- Air traffic control procedures were not accurate.
- After touchdown at O'Hare airport, the first officer kept pushing the rudder pedals back and forth while the outside view shows the plane veering right and left during the rollout. That too was impossible, since the hydraulic fluid had been lost on both hydraulic systems. Neither the rudder or the nose-wheel steering can move at all, without hydraulics operating normally.
- The film mentions braking attempts by the first officer, when he pushes the rudder pedals after touchdown, but it shows his feet on the bottom of those rudder pedals. It is not possible to get any braking at all, unless the pilot pushes on the top of those pedals, even if there was hydraulic brake fluid available, which the film implies there wasn't. Both hydraulic systems were destroyed by the bullets fired from the gun in the cabin.

== Reception ==
Mayday at 40,000 Feet! originally aired on CBS television on November 12, 1976. Film reviewer Simon Smith considered the film an homage to the popular Airport-style brand of group-jeopardy movie-of-the-week epic. His review noted: "It’s a disarmingly camp film. Each character has a personality and I wish some of the modern-day films would bother to paint some real characters and then not kill them off after giving them a whole two scenes of character building. This film, like the original two Airport’s, focuses on characters more than the disaster which is a part of the journey, not what the whole things all about." Mayday at 40,000 Feet! was released on DVD by Warner Bros. Digital Distribution on November 17, 2009.
