= The Gentle Rain (film) =

1966 film directed by Burt Balaban

- Directed by: Burt Balaban
- Written by: Robert Cream
- Produced by: Burt Balaban; Bert Caudle Jr.
- Starring: Christopher George; Lynda Day; Fay Spain
- Cinematography: Mario DiLeo
- Edited by: Fima Noveck
- Music by: Luiz Bonfá; Eumir Deodato
- Production company: Comet Pictures
- Distributed by: Allied Artists Pictures
- Release date: January 10, 1966
- Running time: 110 minutes
- Countries: United States; Brazil
- Language: English

The Gentle Rain is a 1966 American-Brazilian drama film produced and directed by Burt Balaban and starring Christopher George, Lynda Day and Fay Spain. It became best known for its theme song "The Gentle Rain". It was the first production to star George and Day together; they would frequently appear together in both film and television roles throughout their careers, and they married in 1970.

This was Balaban's final film; he died from cancer on October 14, 1965, several months before the film premiered.

== Plot ==
Judy Reynolds is a young lady who considers herself romantically "frigid" but wants to find her sense of passion for life. She takes an airline flight, running away from her parents in New York City to relocate to Rio de Janeiro. There she meets an attractive architect working on a large construction project. He does not respond to her attempts to begin a conversation, so Judy apologizes for disturbing him and leaves.

Judy's acquaintance Nancy explains that Bill is mute, caused by an accident in which his former girlfriend was killed. Following a party held for Americans who live and work in Rio, Judy accompanies Bill to his apartment where he feebly tries to play guitar for her. He then shows her a letter, the first he has written in years, that states that since their first meeting he has fallen in love with her. However, she doubts that Bill is truly in love.

While the rain falls on Bill's window, he writes "Don't pity me" on the glass panes, then collapses in sadness onto his bed. Judy sits on the bed to comfort him. Using basic gestures, he explains the details of the accident that left him mute. Bill was unable to rescue his fiancée from the burning wreck, and following his last desperate scream as she died, he was left unable to speak.

Judy continues to meet with Bill and their relationship begins to grow. After spending the day together touring Rio, they return to his home and make love that evening. When Judy wakes, she begins a one-sided conversation with Bill, confronting him with the truth that he can speak, but will not, because he has been punishing himself for the past three years. Judy leaves Bill alone in his room to face his inner demons. Bill realizes that he wants his relationship with Judy to continue but that he must reconcile his past to move forward in life. Bill considers phoning Judy to prove that he can indeed speak.

Bill fears that he has lost Judy, and he stares at the phone that he must use to save the relationship. Grabbing his hair, he shakes as though shivering in great frustration.

== Cast ==
- Christopher George as Bill Patterson
- Lynda Day as Judy Reynolds
- Fay Spain as Nancy Masters
- Maria Helena Dias as Gloria
- Lon Clark as Harry Masters
- Barbara Williams as Girl Friend
- Robert Assumpaco as Hotel Manager
- Herbert Moss as Jimmy
- Bert Caudle Jr. as Party Guest
- Nadir Fernandes as Nightclub Girl
- Lorena as Jewelry Girl

== Production ==
The Gentle Rain was primarily filmed in Brazil. During the shoot, costars Christopher George and Linda Day renewed their friendship, begun while they worked for the same modeling agency, and would often meet for coffee.

== Reception ==
The world premiere of The Gentle Rain was held at the Florida Theater in Fort Lauderdale, Florida on February 10, 1966. The film was afforded a very limited American release in select markets.

In a contemporary review in the Miami Herald, critic George Bourke likened the style of The Gentle Rain to that of French New Wave films and wrote: "[Balaban] has given his off-beat story ... thoughtful and at times tender treatment. In doing so, he may have prevented his film from getting the major attention it might have merited."

In the Fort Lauderdale News, reviewer Bob Freund called The Gentle Rain "a charming, idyllic film about young love", writing: "Soap opera? Well, yes, 'The Gentle Rain' might fit into that over-used description. But it is a beautifully sustained mood film. While it is too long for what it tells, the picture creates a genuine interest in its characters, due to the intelligent direction of the late Burt Balaban."

Critic Bill Morrison of the Raleigh News and Observer panned the film: "A film should have a point of view and if successful will create and sustain a style that will make it linger in a viewer's memory. 'The Gentle Rain' fails. ... The film is just too erratic."

== Bibliography ==
- K. E. Goldschmitt. Bossa Mundo: Brazilian Music in Transnational Media Industries. Oxford University Press, 2019.
