= Kelly McBroom =

Canadian National Ski Alpine Team Member (born 1989)

Kelly McBroom (born March 21, 1989) is a former Canadian National Ski Alpine Team Member from 2008 to 2011. A member of the National Team for three years, Kelly started racing at Mount Norquay Ski Resort in the Rocky Mountains.

In the 2008-2009 season, Kelly raced Nor-Am and Europa Cup races. She had a career with a best result of 6th in a Europa Cup DH in Caspoggio, Italy. Kelly was second over all in the SG Nor-Am standings, earning herself a World Cup spot for the 2009-2010 season. She was third overall in the Nor-Am DH standings for the 2008-2009 season. Kelly was also the Canadian Super-Combined Champion for 2008.

In February 2009 Kelly suffered a horrific crash which ended her season early and forced her to take the 2009-2010 season off to rehab her right knee. Kelly started skiing again in December 2009 and will return to competition in the fall of 2010. During a training run in Saalback, Austria on January 3, 2011, Kelly suffered a new injury, fracturing her left Tibia.

Following her World Cup Career, Kelly joined the Montana State Bobcats Ski Team to Compete in NCAA Division I Skiing.
