= Lynda Day George =

American actress (born 1944)

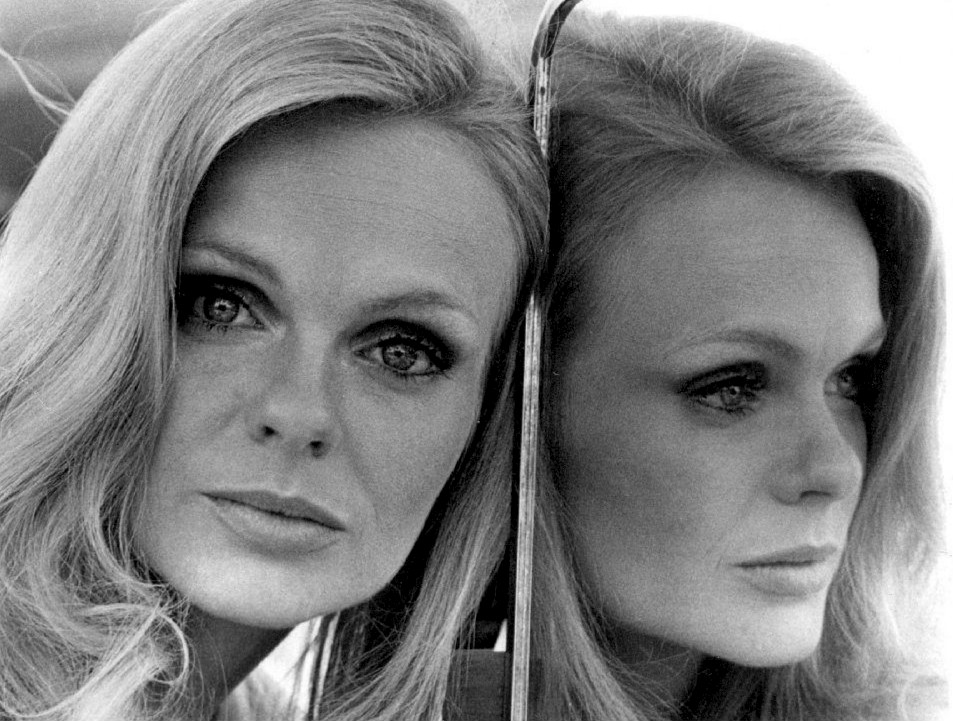
- Lynda Day George in publicity picture for 1973 telefilm She Cried Murder
- Born: Lynda Louise Day; December 11, 1944 (age 81); San Marcos, Texas, U.S.
- Years active: 1961–1989, 2026
- Spouses: Joseph Pantano (m. 1963; div. 1970) Christopher George (m. 1970; died 1983) Doug Cronin (m. 1990; died 2010)
- Children: 2

Lynda Louise Day George (born Lynda Louise Day; December 11, 1944) is an American television and film actress whose career spanned three decades from the 1960s to the 1980s. She was a cast member on Mission: Impossible (1971–1973). She was also the wife of actor Christopher George.

== Life and career ==
Day George was born in San Marcos, Texas. Originally known as Lynda Day, she began her career in the 1960s with the Eileen Ford modeling agency working as a top model in print and TV commercials, and then on Broadway starring in The Devils opposite Jason Robards and Anne Bancroft. Bancroft acted as a mentor to Day, who described working on the play as formative to her acting. She auditioned for the film Bye Bye Birdie but was not cast. She then moved to Los Angeles and began a long television career with guest roles on many series of the 1960s, including Route 66, Flipper, T.H.E. Cat, Here Come the Brides, The Green Hornet, Mannix, The Fugitive, The Invaders, It Takes a Thief, The Virginian, Good Morning World, Lancer and Bonanza. She starred in the first of the two Universal/NBC TV-pilot films based around psychiatrist/supernatural investigator Dr. David Sorrell (played by Louis Jourdan), Fear No Evil in 1969. She had her first major role as Amelia Cole in a short-lived 1970–1971 television series, The Silent Force, and later starred in the television pilot for Cannon in 1971. That same year, she was cast as Casey in the critically acclaimed series Mission: Impossible, garnering a Golden Globe nomination in 1972 and an Emmy Award nomination in 1973. During the show's last season, she missed ten episodes because of her maternity leave and was temporarily replaced by Barbara Anderson.

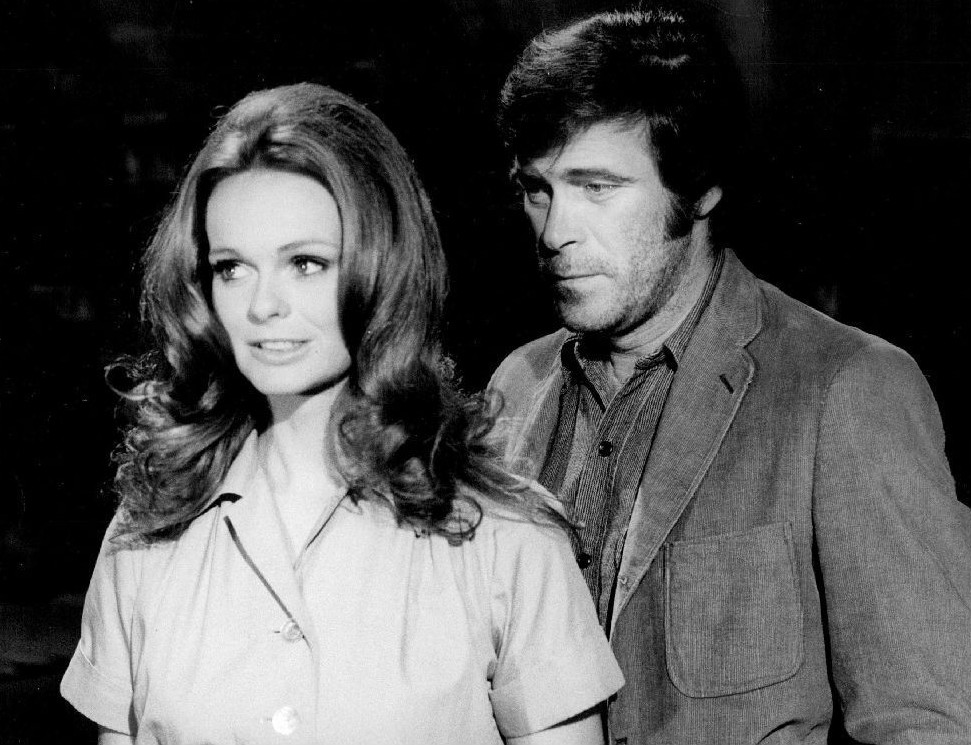
With Christopher George in Mission: Impossible (1971)

She first met actor Christopher George while they were both models at Eileen Ford. They starred together in the 1966 independent film The Gentle Rain, Day's first role in a theatrical film, by which time she was married to her first husband. While working together again in the 1970 John Wayne film Chisum, Day and Christopher George became romantically involved and were married on May 15, 1970; Day divorced her first husband earlier that year.

Thereafter, she became Lynda Day George and co-starred in multiple television films with her husband over the next 10 years, including The House on Greenapple Road (1970), Mayday at 40,000 Feet! (1976), and Cruise Into Terror (1978). They also worked together in episodes of The F.B.I. (1970), Mission: Impossible (1971), McCloud (1975), The Love Boat (1977), and Vega$ (1978). They guest-starred in television's Wonder Woman in 1976, with Lynda playing villain Fausta Grables, the Nazi Wonder Woman. The many co-star roles came about because she and her husband had the same agent, who was aware that they enjoyed working with one another.

She continued her television work throughout the 1970s with guest roles on television series The Immortal, which starred husband Christopher; Police Story; Kung Fu; Marcus Welby, M.D.; and Barnaby Jones. She appeared with her husband on an episode of Celebrity Bowling in 1975. She played supporting roles in Rich Man, Poor Man; Roots; and Once an Eagle. In 1977, she appeared on the game shows Match Game '77 and Tattletales, the latter with her husband Christopher.

Her movie career is noted for several horror cult films in which she co-starred with her husband Christopher, including Day of the Animals (1977), Pieces (1982), and Mortuary (1983). She also co-starred with John Saxon in the 1980 horror film Beyond Evil.

Christopher George died of a heart attack on November 28, 1983, at the age of 52. Lynda worked only sporadically after that, in guest roles on Fantasy Island (appearing several times on the series, playing a different character each time); Murder, She Wrote; Hardcastle and McCormick; and Blacke's Magic. She was also a regular guest on various religious television programs. In one of her final performances, Lynda reprised the role of Casey (now given the full name Lisa Casey) on an episode of the revived Mission: Impossible television series in 1989.

In 2021, George announced that she was ready to return to acting. As of 2023, however, no new roles have been announced.

In 2026, she made her return to acting in the dark comedy Ralph's Perfekt Christmas as the titular character's grandmother.

=== Marriages ===
She was first married to Joseph Pantano from 1963 to 1970, with one son, Nicky. She left Pantano to marry Christopher George. She was married to him from May 15, 1970, until his death on November 28, 1983, and they had one daughter, Krisinda Casey. They filed suit to have Nicky Pantano legally declared as Christopher's natural son. In 1990, Lynda George married actor and producer Doug Cronin, who died of cancer on December 4, 2010; they resided in Los Angeles and Gardiner, Washington.

=== Memoir ===
On January 17, 2020, during an interview with entertainment correspondent Ed Robertson of TV Confidential, George announced that she was collaborating with a biographer on a memoir centered on her acting career. The working title is Lynda Day George: A Hollywood Memoir. Her biographer co-author died in 2021, but in 2023 George said she is still resolved that the book will eventually be published, and that her agent is working on finding another co-author and a publisher.

== Filmography and TV work ==
Year	Title	Role	Notes
1961	The Outsider	Kim	
1962	Route 66	Bibi	Episode: "You Never Had It So Good"
1963	Route 66	Allison	Episode: "A Long Way from St. Louie"
1963	Rockabye the Infantry	Connie Mahoney	TV short
1964	Flipper	Linda Granville	Episode: "Second Time Around"
1964	NBC Children's Theatre	Maid Marian	Episode: "Robin Hood"
1966	Felony Squad	Karen Anders	Episode: "Fear Below"
1966	T.H.E. Cat	Lisa Heller	Episode: "The System"
1966	The Green Hornet	Ardis Ralston	Episode: "Deadline for Death"
1966	Hawk	Charlotte Burns	Episode: "Game with a Dead End"
1966	Seaway	Leonora	Episode: "Don't Forget to Wipe the Blood Off: Parts 1 & 2"
1966	The Gentle Rain	Judy Reynolds	
1967	The F.B.I.	Mindy Platt	Episode: "Sky on Fire"
1967	The F.B.I.	Carol Grant	Episode: "Line of Fire"
1967	Mannix	Carol Blake	Episode: "Then the Drink Takes the Man"
1967	The Invaders	Janet Wilk	Episode: "The Trial"
1967	Cowboy in Africa	Liz Carter	Episode: "What's an Elephant Mother to Do?"
1967	Coronet Blue	Jenny Straigh	Episode: "A Dozen Demons"
1967	The Virginian	Judy Atkins	Episode: "A Welcoming Town"
1967	The Fugitive	Nadine Newmark	Episode: "There Goes the Ball Game"
1968	Lancer	Sarah Cassidy	Episode: "The Escape"
1968	Bonanza	Lisa Jackson	Episode: "The Stronghold"
1968	It Takes a Thief	Samantha Sutton	Episode: "A Matter of Royal Larceny"
1968	Good Morning World	Cecily Hutton	Episode: "For My Daughter's Hand, You'll Get My Foot"
1968	The F.B.I.	Joyce Carr	Episode: "The Widow"
1968	Felony Squad	Julie Brown	Episode: "The Flip Side of Fear: Parts 1 & 2"
1968	The Sound of Anger	Barbara Keeley	Television movie
1969	Fear No Evil	Barbara Anholt	
1970	Chisum	Sue McSween	
1970	The Immortal	Terry Kerwin	Episode: "Man on a Punched Card"
1970	Here Come the Brides	Valerie	Episode: "Two Women"
1970	House on Greenapple Road	Lillian Crane	Television movie
1970	The F.B.I.	Maria Pierce	Episode: "Return to Power"
1970–1971	The Silent Force	Amelia Cole	Main cast
1971	Cannon	Christie Redfield	Episode: "Pilot"
1971	The Sheriff	Alma Gregory	ABC Movie of the Week
1971–1973	Mission: Impossible	(Lisa) Casey	Main role (seasons 6-7)
1973	Barnaby Jones	Ellie Briggs	Episode: "Stand-In for Death"
1973	Police Story	Angela Wilson	Episode: "The Big Walk"
1973	Set This Town on Fire	Molly Thornburgh	Television movie
1973	She Cried Murder	Sarah Cornell	Television movie
1974	Petrocelli	Vickie Richardson	Episode: "By Reason of Madness"
1974	Thriller	Cathy More	Episode: "Come Out, Come Out, Wherever You Are"
1974	Marcus Welby, M.D.	Leigh Conforti	Episode: "I've Promised You a Father: Part 1"
1974	Owen Marshall: Counselor at Law	Leigh Conforti	Episode: "I've Promised You a Father: Part 2"
1974	The Magician	Stacey Hyatt	Episode: "The Illusion of Black Gold"
1974	Kung Fu	Dora Burnham	Episode: "In Uncertain Bondage"
1974	Panic on the 5:22	Mary Ellen Lewis	ABC Movie of the Week
1975	Barnaby Jones	Brina Douglas	Episode: "Double Vengeance"
1975	Ellery Queen	Alma Van Dine	Episode: "The Adventure of the Comic Book Crusader"
1975	Death Among Friends	Lisa Manning	Television movie
1975	Barbary Coast	Clio Du Bois	Episode: "The Barbary Coast"
1975	McCloud	Stacy Decker	Episode: "Sharks!"
1975	The Trial of Chaplain Jensen	Louise Kennelly	ABC Movie of the Week
1976	Mayday at 40,000 Feet!	Cathy Armello	Television movie
1976	Wonder Woman	Fausta Grables	Episode: "The Nazi Wonder Woman"
1976	Rich Man, Poor Man	Linda Quayles	TV Miniseries, 1 episode
1976	Most Wanted	Laurie Chandler	Episode: "The Ten-Percenter"
1976	Once an Eagle	Marge Krisler	TV Miniseries, 4 episodes
1976	Twin Detectives	Nancy Pendleton	Television movie
1977	Roots	Mrs. Reynolds	TV Miniseries, 3 episodes
1977	Murder at the World Series	Margot Mannering	Television movie
1977	Day of the Animals	Terry Marsh	
1977	Match Game '77		
1977	It Happened at Lakewood Manor	Valerie Adams	Television movie
	Switch	Dominique Deveraux	Episode: "Two on the Run"
1978	Cruise Into Terror	Sandra Barry	Television movie
1978	The Return of Captain Nemo	Kate	TV Miniseries, 3 episodes
1978	Fantasy Island	Iris Chandler	Episode: "Trouble, My Lovely/The Common Man"
1978	Fantasy Island	Nancy Harding	Episode: "Homecoming/The Sheikh"
1978	The Love Boat	Laura Wakefield	Episode: "A Selfless Love/The Nubile Nurse/Parents Know Best"
1978	Vega$	Sandra Wells	Episode: "Serve, Volley and Kill"
1979	Racquet	Monica Gordon	
1979	The Love Boat	Peggy Rossmore	Episode: "Play by Play/Cindy/What's a Brother For?"
1979	The Littlest Hobo	Lisa Phillips	Episode: "Little Girl Lost"
1980	Fantasy Island	Lorraine Peters	Episode: "With Affection, Jack the Ripper/Gigolo"
1980	Beyond Evil	Barbara Andrews	
1980	Casino	Carol	Television movie
1981	Fantasy Island	Dr. Carla Frankenstein	Episode: "The Lady and the Monster/The Last Cowboy"
1982	Benson	as Gabrielle Simone	season 4 episodes 1 & 2
1982	Pieces	Mary Riggs	
1982	The Love Boat	Barbara Lee	Episode: "Green, But Not Jolly/Past Perfect Love/Instant Family"
1982	Mortuary	Eve Parson	
1983	Masquerade	Jackie	Episode: "Girls for Sale"
1983	Young Warriors	Beverly Carrigan	
1984	Fantasy Island	Nora Leonard	Episode: "Sweet Life/Games People Play"
1985	Murder, She Wrote	Diane Shelley	Episode: "My Johnny Lies Over the Ocean"
1985	Hardcastle and McCormick	Mrs. Burt Schneider	Episode: "Too Rich and Too Thin"
1986	Blacke's Magic	Louise Richmond	Episode: "Address Unknown"
1989	Mission: Impossible	Lisa Casey	Episode: "Reprisal"
2026	Ralph's Perfekt Christmas	Grandma	

== Awards and nominations ==
Year	Award	Category	Production	Result
1972	Golden Globe	Best TV Actress - Drama	Mission: Impossible	Nominated
1973	Emmy Award	Outstanding Continued Performance by an Actress in a Leading Role (Drama Series - Continuing)	Mission: Impossible	Nominated
