= Danielle von Zerneck =

American actress and film producer (born 1965)

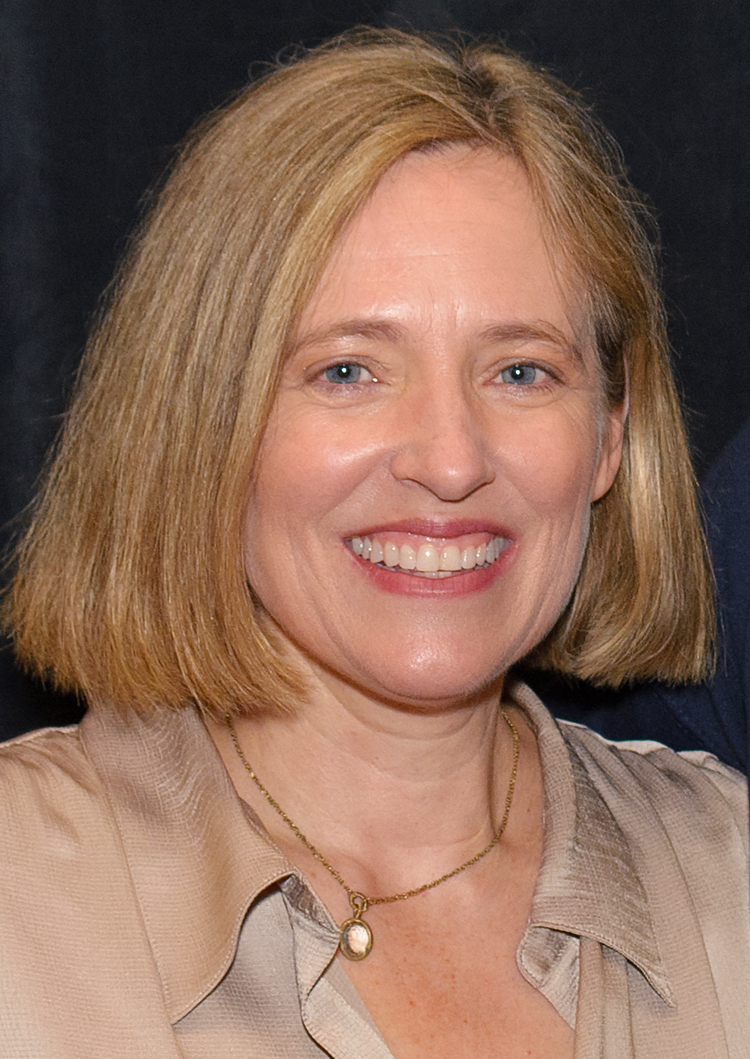
- Danielle von Zerneck at the Chiller Theatre Expo in 2017
- Born: December 21, 1965 (age 60); North Hollywood, Los Angeles, California, US
- Occupations: Actress, film producer
- Years active: 1976–2001 (actress); 1995–1996, 2012–present (producer)
- Spouse: James Fearnley (m. 1989)
- Father: Frank von Zerneck
- Relatives: Daniel P. Mannix (grandfather)

Danielle von Zerneck (born December 21, 1965) is an American film producer and former actress.

== Early life, family and education ==
Born in North Hollywood, Los Angeles, California, Danielle is the daughter of film producer Frank von Zerneck and actress Julie Mannix (daughter of author Daniel P. Mannix).

== Career ==
von Zerneck began her acting career in commercials and television films. From 1983 to 1984, she played Louisa "Lou" Swenson on General Hospital. She is perhaps best known for her portrayal of Donna Ludwig, Ritchie Valens' girlfriend in the film La Bamba (1987). Her last acting credit was in the 2001 television film Acceptable Risk, based on the novel of the same name. She has worked primarily as a film and television producer in recent years including Recovery Road, No One Would Tell and Christmas on Honeysuckle Lane.

== Personal life ==
In 1989, she married James Fearnley, an English accordion player for the Irish folk/punk band The Pogues.

== Filmography ==
=== Acting ===
==== Film ====
Year	Title	Role	Notes
1976	Tunnel Vision	Daughter	
1985	My Science Project	Ellie Sawyer	
1987	La Bamba	Donna Ludwig	
1988	Under the Boardwalk	Allie	
1988	Dangerous Curves	Michelle West	
1989	Tale of Two Sisters	Adult Bug Girl	
1990	Arduous Moon	Shana	Short film
1992	Deuce Coupe	Virginia	
1995	Living in Oblivion	Wanda	

==== Television ====
Year	Title	Role	Notes
1977	Sharon: Portrait of a Mistress	Heather	TV film
1983-84	General Hospital	Louisa "Lou" Swenson	TV series
1984	Summer Fantasy	Denise Biaggi	TV film
1986	Foley Square		"Kid Stuff"
1986	Walt Disney's Wonderful World of Color	Susie Fratelli	"A Fighting Choice"
1987	Spenser: For Hire	Lisa Bodman	"Murder and Acquisitions"
1987	Family Ties	June	"Return of the Native"
1988	ABC Afterschool Special	Samm Matian	"Date Rape"
1989	CBS Summer Playhouse	Holly Hagen	"Curse of the Corn People"
1990	By Dawn's Early Light	Radnor's Wife	TV film
1990	Opposites Attract	Sky	TV film
1991	Doogie Howser, M.D.	Shannon Nichols	"Doogstruck"
1992	Survive the Savage Sea	Susan	TV film
1992	Woman with a Past	Tammy	TV film
1993	Dream On	Kat	"And Bobby Makes Three"
1993	Beyond Suspicion		TV film
1995	Deadly Invasion: The Killer Bee Nightmare	Linda	TV film
1997	Holiday in Your Heart	Photographer	TV film
2001	Acceptable Risk	Gloria	TV film

=== Producer ===
Year	Title	Notes
1995	Living in Oblivion	TV film (associate)
1996	God's Lonely Man	TV film

==== Executive producer only ====
Year	Title	Notes
2012	Left to Die	TV film
2016	Recovery Road	TV series
2018	No One Would Tell	TV film
2018	Christmas on Honeysuckle Lane	TV film
2018	Christmas Around the Corner	TV film
2016	Christmas 9 to 5	TV film
2016	Poisoned Love: The Stacey Castor Story	TV film
2020	The Christmas Setup	TV film
2021	Dying to Belong	TV film
2021	An Ice Wine Christmas	TV film
2021	A Clüsterfünke Christmas	TV film
2021	Under the Christmas Tree	TV film
2022	Designing Christmas	TV film
