= Abby (film) =

1974 film

- Theatrical release poster
- Directed by: William Girdler
- Written by: G. Cornell Layne
- Produced by: William Girdler; Mike Henry; G. Cornell Layne
- Starring: Carol Speed; William Marshall; Terry Carter; Austin Stoker
- Cinematography: William Asman
- Edited by: Henry Asman; Corky Ehlers
- Music by: Robert O. Ragland
- Distributed by: American International Pictures
- Release date: December 25, 1974
- Running time: 89 minutes
- Country: United States
- Language: English
- Budget: $100,000 (inflated figure reported as $472,529)
- Box office: $2.6 million

Abby is a 1974 American blaxploitation supernatural horror film about a woman who is possessed by a Yoruba sex spirit. The film stars Carol Speed as the title character, William H. Marshall and Terry Carter. It was directed by William Girdler, who co-wrote the film's story with screenwriter Gordon Cornell Layne.

The film was a financial success, considering its modest budget at the time. It grossed $4 million in a month, but was pulled from theaters after the film's distributor, American International Pictures, was accused of copyright violation by Warner Bros., which saw the film as being derivative of The Exorcist and filed a lawsuit against AIP. Girdler himself told the Louisville Courier Journal: "Sure, we made Abby to come in on the shirttail of The Exorcist." The film is also inspired by 1968's Rosemary's Baby.

== Plot ==
Dr. Garrett Williams explains to his students, "Eshu is the most powerful of all earthly deities. Eshu is a trickster, creator of whirlwinds... chaos."

While on an archaeological dig in a cave in Nigeria, Dr. Williams finds a small puzzle box, carved with the symbols of Eshu: the whirlwind, the cock's comb, and the erect phallus. When Dr. Williams discovers the mechanism to open the box and unlatches it, a tremendous wind blasts out, knocking Dr. Williams and his men against the cave walls and floor.

The spirit released by Dr. Williams travels to Louisville, Kentucky. Dr. Williams' son, Emmett, and Emmett's wife, Abby, are moving into a new house, and that night, strange events happen in the house, including Abby becoming possessed. The signs start small, with Abby getting aroused in the shower, but slowly get more bizarre and dangerous, with her lashing out at people or trying to seduce various men.

Emmett takes Abby to the hospital, where the doctors note no neurological abnormalities, but recommend she see a psychiatrist. When Emmett gets home, he calls Dr Williams back home, telling him her situation has worsened. As Dr Williams lands back in Louisville, Abby escapes the hospital, and when she gets back home, tries to seduce Dr Williams. When he rejects her advances and reprimands the demon inside her, she uses her demonic powers to shake the house. While the men struggle to get back on their feet, Abby escapes, and Emmett steals a car to try and find her. Abby's brother Cass arrives to help, and Dr Williams tells him about Eshu and if Abby is not exorcised, the demon will kill her.

Abby escapes to a nightclub and seduces various men until Emmett and Cass arrive and try to stop her. When all else fails, Dr Williams arrives at the club, and he, Emmett, and Cass manage to exorcise the demon (to which Dr Williams confirms to be a fake Eshu) out of Abby. The spirit returns to the box in which it came, and Emmett comforts a crying Abby, who is unaware of what has happened. Emmett and Abby then go on a vacation, still a happy couple.

== Production notes ==
The film's use of the Yoruba religion distinguishes it from The Exorcist. In the story, Abby is apparently possessed by Eshu, a West African orisha of chaos and whirlwinds. He is also a trickster and the guardian of roads, particularly crossroads.

Why and how the spirit travels the globe is not explained, and the dialogue doesn't specify whether the spirit inside Abby is Eshu. The plot's final resolution leaves the point unclear. In And You Call Yourself A Scientist, Elizabeth A. Kingsley wrote "from a theological point of view, the final section of Abby is quite fascinating. Toward the end of the film, having spent some time taking the demon's measure, Garret decides that it is not in fact Eshu, but a rather pathetic Eshu wannabe... who presumably was imprisoned by Eshu."

== Cast ==
- William Marshall as Bishop Garret Williams
- Terry Carter as Reverend Emmett Williams
- Austin Stoker as Detective Cass Potter
- Carol Speed as Abby Williams
- Juanita Moore as Miranda "Momma" Potter
- Charles Kissinger as Dr. Hennings
- Elliott Moffitt as Russell Lang
- Nathan Cook as Tafa Hassan
- Nancy Lee Owens as Mrs. Wiggins
- William P. Bradford as Dr. Rogers
- Bob Holt as The Demon

== Production ==
Abby was directed and produced by William Girdler, a filmmaker who specialized in exploitation pictures that were often in the horror genre. Films such as Grizzly and The Manitou are some of Girdler's more notable productions, while Abby achieved a more infamous reputation because it was accused of copyright violation by Warner Bros., who felt it was a direct copy of The Exorcist. Warner Bros. won their court case, and Abby was eventually pulled from theaters, but not before it was able to take in almost $4 million.

Abby was filmed in 1974 in Louisville, Kentucky. Carol Speed wasn't chosen to play Abby at first. She recalls: "Abby was a low-budget production. They originally had another woman to play the role, but she was very demanding. She wanted a personal masseuse on the set. They couldn't afford it. So when David Baumgorten (Agency of the Performing Artist) telephoned and asked me if I needed a masseuse while filming - I happily said 'no.' He said, "Good. Pick up the script Abby from AIP. You'll leave for Louisville in two or three days... The script reminded me of The Three Faces of Eve which starred Paul Newman's wife. I thought Abby was a wonderful vehicle to show off my acting. I didn't give the Yoruba religion that much thought. I started memorizing Abby's lines. I was also very comfortable with Eshu. Voodoo doesn't bother me. It's part of being African."

In one scene, Speed's title character was required to sing a song during church services. Speed agreed, and the song was one that she herself wrote and composed, titled "Is Your Soul a Witness?". No official recordings of this song were known to exist, aside from the film's soundtrack reels.

The production of the film was met with an unusual threat when Louisville experienced a series of tornadoes that tore through the area around the set of Abby. Speed recalled spending time with co-star Juanita Moore huddled in the lobby of their hotel, wrapped in blankets for protection. "Juanita and I immediately left the set when the daytime sky turned pitch black," she said. "We ended up rolled in some blankets on the lobby floor. Ramada had built this nice hotel, but no basement or tornado shelter. Just glass windows...everywhere."

William Marshall was vocal about his unhappiness with the production of Abby, mostly because he had been promised certain script revisions that never materialized. Marshall did add certain elements to the film regarding the Yoruba religion.

== Critical reaction ==
The New York Times review published December 26, 1974, mentioned that "Abby is more silly than shocking even if it seems to take itself seriously."

In 2006, Retrocrush named the movie one of the "Top Ten Films in Limbo" stating "Horror wunderkind William Girdler, director of Grizzly and Day of the Animals, has created an irresistible period trashterpiece, one that places the action in a black family and replaces Catholic references with an African fertility deity, freed by Blacula's William Marshall."

== Urban legends and on-set incidents ==
Carol Speed talked about the set of Abby being cursed, similar to what happened with The Exorcist a year before. She mentioned accidents, people falling ill and tornadoes. Pat Kelly, who managed the film, stated, "Nothing happened that would be considered unusual. Carol - and maybe a couple of others - were so hoping things would go strange, that they may have convinced themselves of a great evil over us - the tornadoes were the closest - but they hit 10 states, so it was not just Abby that had somebody up there (or down) awful mad!"

== Scarcity of prints ==
Abby was out of circulation for many years, partially due to the lawsuit instigated by Warner Bros., and also because of the uncertain propriety of distribution rights. The ownership of the original film elements of Abby is still in question. The film was released on DVD on three different occasions, all within a year's time of each other. It was first released October 2006 as a Collector's Edition, released by CineFear. That edition went out of stock on the day of its release on Amazon. It appears to have been transferred from a visually flawed 16 mm print of the film, which is possibly the only format in which celluloid prints of Abby are still found. The Black Exorcist Edition was then released June 2007. Its third DVD release appeared as part of a Demonic Double Feature set in September 2007, packaged with the German Exorcist film Magdalena, vom Teufel besessen.

As a clean, original copy of the film remains unreleased, it is unclear if the injunction awarded to Warner is still active. In 2013, a 16mm print of the movie was screened at The CineFamily. It is also suggested that Warner not only instigated a lawsuit against the film, but also confiscated all of the 35mm copies produced in 1975.

== See also ==
- List of American films of 1974
