= Go for Gold =

Go for gold may refer to:

- Go for Gold (film), a 1984 movie by Stuart F. Fleming
- "Go for Gold", a 1988 hit song by German band The Winners written for the 1988 Olympics
- "Go for Gold!", a 1991 episode of The Raccoons
- Go For Gold (sports program), a private sports sponsorship program in the Philippines
- Go for Gold Philippines, a UCI Continental road cycling team based in the Philippines
