= James Pickett =

James Pickett may refer to:

- James Pickett, musician in Cellador
- Jamie Pickett, musician on The Voice (U.S. season 3)
- James Chamberlayne Pickett (1793-1872), superintendent of the American Patent Office
- James Pickett (actor) in Three on a Meathook
- James A. Pickett House on National Register of Historic Places listings in Shelby County, Kentucky
