= Terry Carter =

American actor and filmmaker (1928–2024)

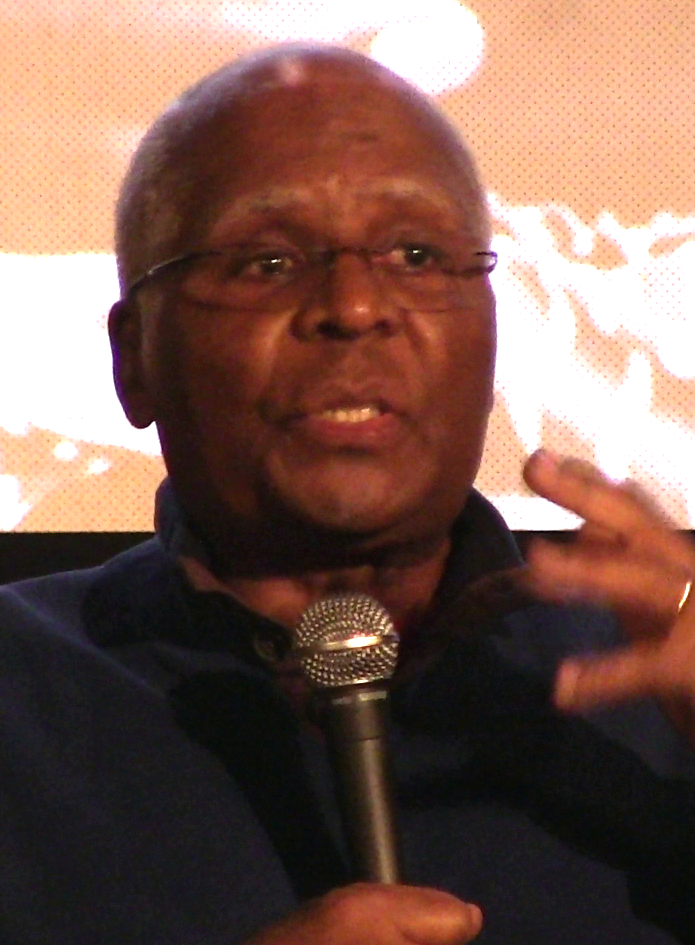
- Carter in 2015
- Born: John Everett DeCoste; December 16, 1928; New York City, U.S.
- Died: April 23, 2024 (aged 95); New York City, U.S.
- Occupations: Actor, filmmaker
- Years active: 1957–2012
- Spouse(s): Anna DeCoste (1964–1990); Beate Glatved DeCoste (1991–2006); Selome Zenebe DeCoste (2009–2024)
- Website: www.terry-carter.com

John Everett DeCoste (December 16, 1928 – April 23, 2024), known professionally as Terry Carter, was an African-American actor and filmmaker, known for his roles as Sgt. Joe Broadhurst on the television series McCloud and as Colonel Tigh on the original Battlestar Galactica.

== Early life ==
Carter was born and raised in Williamsburg, Brooklyn, New York City, and lived beside a synagogue in a mostly Italian neighborhood. Raised in a bilingual home, his mother, Mercedes, was a native of the Dominican Republic, and his father, William DeCoste, was of Argentinian and African-American descent who operated a radio repair business. His parents raised him to engage on social issues. With his father, he first walked a picket line at age 8.

Future jazz pioneer Cecil Taylor was his best friend. At age 9, in his first on-stage role, he played the seafaring Portuguese explorer Vasco da Gama.

Carter graduated from Stuyvesant High School in Manhattan in 1946.

Upon graduation, he joined the U.S. Merchant Marine as a merchant seaman, traveling abroad. Returning to the U.S., he became a mail clerk for the New York Museum of Modern Art, and watched every film programmed there.

Thereafter, he attended postsecondary courses at Hunter College, the University of California, Los Angeles, Boston University and Northeastern University, ultimately returning to the latter institution decades after dropping out to complete his Bachelor of Science degree in communications in 1983.

Following his initial Northeastern stint, Carter also completed two years of coursework at St. John's University's School of Law (which either waived the requirement of a Bachelor's degree for Carter or had not yet implemented that prerequisite for admission prior to the widespread implementation of the graduate-level Juris Doctor in lieu of the nominally undergraduate Bachelor of Laws) before leaving to become an actor.

Along the way, he worked nights as a jazz pianist.

== Stage and screen career ==
=== 1950s-1960s acting ===
While studying at St. John's law school, Carter accidentally encountered actors Howard Da Silva and Morris Carnovsky, who convinced Carter that he had the makings of an actor. After his second year of law school, Carter dropped out of school to pursue acting full time.

In the early 1950s, Carter studied acting with Howard Da Silva.

Carter gained theater experience in several productions on the Broadway and off-Broadway stage. His Broadway credits include playing the male lead opposite Eartha Kitt in the play Mrs. Patterson and performing the title role in the musical extravaganza Kwamina.

Carter also acted in numerous television series, specials, and theatrical films. His first breakthrough screen role was as the sole black regular cast member of The Phil Silvers Show (popularly known as Sergeant Bilko), appearing as Pvt. Sugie Sugarman in 91 episodes between 1955 and '59—becoming one of the first black actors appearing regularly on an American television program.

Carter played boxer Rosie Palmer in a 1964 episode of the ABC drama Breaking Point. In 1965, he became the only black actor to portray a soldier in the long-running World War II TV drama series Combat!—appearing as the "guest star" in the season three episode, "The Long Wait".

=== 1960s TV journalism ===
From 1965 to 1968, Carter worked as a weekend newscaster for WBZ-TV in Boston, where he became an anchor-reporter. He was their first black TV news anchor, and the first in New England. Some sources said he was the world's first black TV newsman.

During his three-year stint, he also served as the station's first opening-night movie and theater critic. Although WBZ said he resigned from the station, Carter told the black press that he had been fired, because Westinghouse (which owned WBZ) objected to his personal involvement in numerous community projects. His departure left Boston without any black TV news reporters.

=== 1970s-1980s acting ===
Returning to acting in 1970, Carter primarily portrayed clean-cut, no-nonsense, authority figures.

In his longest-running role, starting in 1970, Carter starred in the TV detective series McCloud as NYPD Sergeant Joe Broadhurst, partner of the title character played by Dennis Weaver. Carter's role lasted for seven years.

In 1970, he starred with Van Johnson and Ray Milland in the TV movie Company of Killers.

In 1973, he played the lead role in the early Blaxploitation film Brother on the Run. In a seminal hit of the genre, Foxy Brown (played by Pam Grier), he played her boyfriend.

By contrast, in the 1974 children's film Benji, he played the part of Police Officer Tuttle. The same year he starred in the blaxploitation horror film Abby along with William Marshall and Carol Speed.

Carter is best known internationally for his late-1970s co-starring role as Colonel Tigh in the science-fiction TV series Battlestar Galactica. He was originally cast as Lieutenant Boomer, but was cut following a roller skating accident that fractured his ankle. After replacing Carter with Herb Jefferson, Jr., producer Glen A. Larson instead offered Terry Carter the role of Colonel Tigh, second in command of the ragtag fleet of starships, giving the series the distinction for the time of having more than one regular African-American character in the principal cast.

=== 1990s and later acting ===
He played the role of CIA chief "Texas Slim" in Hamilton, a multinational action-adventure Swedish film (1999). More recently, Carter had a recurring role in Hotel Caesar, Norway's most popular soap opera, as Solomon Tefari, an Ethiopian businessman and father of one of the main characters.

== Production career ==
In 1975, Carter started a small Los Angeles corporation, Meta/4 Productions, Inc. for which he produced and directed industrial and educational presentations on film and videotape for the federal government—including the National Endowment for the Arts and the Library of Congress—and for PBS television.

Carter was president of Council for Positive Images, Inc., a non-profit organization he formed in 1979, dedicated to enhancing intercultural and interethnic understanding through audiovisual communication and within media.

Under the council's auspices, Carter produced and directed award-winning dramatic and documentary programs for presentation on PBS and distribution worldwide.

In the 1980s, Carter created, directed and produced the TV miniseries K*I*D*S, about a diverse group of teens, struggling with the intense conflicts facing American youth of the era. In 1985, the series was awarded a Los Angeles Emmy

Carter's 1988 PBS documentary for the American Masters series -- A Duke Named Ellington, about the life of jazz legend Duke Ellington—was nominated for the Emmy for Outstanding Informational Special.

== Industry leadership and final career ==
Carter was a Governor on the board of Governors of the Academy of Television Arts and Sciences (who award The Emmys), serving two terms. In 1983, he was inducted into the Academy of Motion Picture Arts and Sciences, serving on the foreign films committee and the documentary committee for the Academy Awards ("The Oscars").

In the early 1990s, the United States Information Agency sent him on a goodwill tour of China to liaise with China's students and filmmakers. He spent the last years of his career working in Scandinavia.

In 2013, he retired to New York City.

== Death ==
Carter died in New York City on April 23, 2024, at the age of 95. Mr. Carter retired to his home town of New York City where he lived until his death. He is survived by his wife Selome DeCoste, his two children Miguel and Melinda, Selome DeCoste’s daughter, a grand daughter, and many cousins. Twice widowed, he was preceded in death by his late wives Anna DeCoste (1964–1990) and Beate Glatved DeCoste (1991–2006)

== Selected projects ==
- Katherine Dunham Technique – Library of Congress
  A 2-½ hour presentation of the dance technique of anthropologist-choreographer Katherine Dunham. Funded by the Doris Duke Charitable Foundation, this video documentary is designed to serve as a study guide for dance teachers, scholars and dancers, as part of the Katherine Dunham Legacy Project of the Library of Congress. In 2012, Terry Carter released The Katherine Dunham Technique as a DVD.
- A Duke Named Ellington - WNET-TV (PBS), American Masters Series (1988)
  This Emmy-nominated two-hour musical documentary features Ellington, reminiscing and performing, as soloist and with his orchestra. A Duke Named Ellington offers a retrospective of Ellington's half-century career, focusing primarily on his music and method, his artistic accomplishments and his role in the development of modern music. A Duke Named Ellington had its world premiere on the PBS American Masters series, to critical acclaim. A Duke Named Ellington was selected as the official US entry in international television festivals in countries such as the People's Republic of China, France, Spain, Italy, Canada, Brazil, Poland, and Bulgaria. A Duke Named Ellington has been telecast in most countries of Europe, as well as in Japan, Australia, and South Africa. The program has been awarded the CINE Golden Eagle and the Golden Antenna. A Duke Named Ellington was nominated for an Emmy Award as "Outstanding Informational Special". In 2007, Carter released A Duke Named Ellington, the documentary he produced for PBS American Masters in 1988, as a DVD.
- Once Upon A Vision - KET-TV (PBS) (1991)
  This one-hour television documentary reveals the history of Berea, Kentucky, a unique 19th Century inter-racial colony founded in the midst of the slave-holding South. Before the Civil War, a group of abolitionists and former slaves began building a community based on unconditional racial and gender equality and participatory democracy. For more than half a century, withstanding persecution from slavers, pro-slavery politicians, and the Ku Klux Klan, these poor white and black settlers lived, and died for, their vision of multi-racial democracy. This program has become part of the secondary-school American History curriculum in Kentucky. Hosted and narrated by historian and author Alex Haley.
- JazzMasters - TV2/Denmark (1988)
  This series of 13 television portraits features musical artists in the world of jazz. An international co-production, JazzMasters was the first program series ever commissioned by TV2/Denmark. The JazzMasters series has been telecast in Scandinavia, France, Poland, Bulgaria and Japan. The series features programs about Chet Baker, Kenny Drew, Dexter Gordon, Johnny Griffin, Bobby Hutcherson, Carmen McRae, Palle Mikkelborg, James Moody, Clark Terry, Randy Weston, Niels Henning Ørsted-Pedersen, Herbie Hancock and Wayne Shorter.
- K*I*D*S - KCET-TV (PBS), US Department of Education (1984)
  This dramatic television miniseries was designed for public broadcasting to promote interracial and interethnic understanding among adolescents. K*I*D*S is the story of a multi-racial group of teenagers struggling to cope with some of the adult-sized conflicts confronting youth in America today. Endorsed by the National Education Association, K*I*D*S, accompanied by a teachers' guide, was also distributed on videocassette to secondary schools throughout the nation. K*I*D*S received an Emmy award in Los Angeles as "Best Series for Children and Youth".

== Awards ==
- Emmy Award, Los Angeles, Best Series for Children and Youth, 1985, for K*I*D*S
- Emmy Nomination, Outstanding Informational Special, 1989, for A Duke Named Ellington
- CINE Golden Eagle, 1989, for A Duke Named Ellington
- Golden Antenna, 1989, for A Duke Named Ellington
- Award for Excellence, L. A. Film Review Board, 1977, for Child Abuse & Neglect Series
