= Mutant (1984 film) =

- Original poster designed by Design Projects, Inc.
- Directed by: John "Bud" Cardos
- Screenplay by: Peter Z. Orton; Michael Jones; John C. Kruize
- Story by: Michael Jones; John C. Kruize
- Produced by: Igo Kantor
- Starring: Wings Hauser; Bo Hopkins; Jody Medford; Lee Montgomery; Marc Clement; Cary Guffey; Jennifer Warren
- Cinematography: Alfred Taylor
- Edited by: Michael J. Duthie
- Music by: Richard Band
- Distributed by: Film Ventures International
- Release date: August 24, 1984
- Running time: 99 minutes
- Country: United States
- Language: English
- Budget: $2.5-3 million

Mutant is a 1984 American horror film. It was initially released to theaters as Night Shadows, but it premiered on video with the Mutant title, which it has retained for all subsequent releases.

== Plot ==
Brothers Josh and Mike are enjoying a vacation in the South when they are run off the road by Al and a few of his friends. They eventually make it to a small town whose inhabitants are getting sick and some are disappearing. They meet Sheriff Will who takes them to a bed and breakfast to stay for the night. As they're sleeping, something comes from under Mike's bed and drags him down.

Josh begins looking through town to find his brother. He meets a schoolteacher named Holly who agrees to help. As they leave the school, they hear strange noises in a storage room. As Josh checks it out, a body of a decomposed schoolgirl falls on him. Al (who is a custodian) accuses him of murder and chases him off, leaving with Holly to her uncle's place where he recovers from the toxic reaction from the girl. As Will is about to take the body to the coroner, he's convinced by Dr. Myra to let her get the body for a night, hoping that she can find out what is causing the sicknesses and other strange happenings.

Will goes to the schoolgirl's residence, where he sees the lightbulbs removed and all the red meat sucked dry. He then finds the dying father. As the Captain makes his way to the house, the body is suddenly gone. Believing that he's been drinking again, the Captain fires Will. As Dr. Myra begins recording her autopsy, her assistant suddenly becomes a mutant and attacks her.

Next morning Josh and Holly head out to a plant that some chemical company just opened a few weeks ago, thinking that this could be the cause of the sickness. As he sneaks in, he finds them dumping toxic waste into the hole before he gets spotted. Holly is able to drive into the building, causing the distraction, allowing Josh and Holly to escape. Will is reluctant to believe their story, but when he sees Holly's uncle become a mutant, they formulate a plan to get the girl's body and take it to the capital to get backup.

Josh heads back to the bed and breakfast to search for Mike. He ends up finding his dead body in the basement. As he's being attacked by the owner's mutant daughter, Josh is able to break out of the basement and throw her mother down there. As Will and Holly enter Dr. Myra's office, they are attacked by mutants. Holly is able to escape, while Will barricades himself in a room where he see the deceased Dr. Myra. Holly goes to the school to chase down a student named Billy. As they try to leave, a large group of mutant children corner them in a stall of a bathroom. The mutants kill Billy, but Josh arrives in time to rescue Holly. They head back to Dr. Myra's office to look for Will, but they can only find his hat and gun. As they try to leave, they are surrounded by mutants and are forced to hide inside a gas station.

Josh and Holly start making Molotov cocktails so they can make an escape. However, Al was hiding in there as well and attacks Holly. This causes Josh and Al to fight, allowing the mutants to hear them and attack. They kill Al while Josh and Holly are forced into a corner. Suddenly, a large group of state police cars surround the gas station shining their lights. The mutants become blinded and confused, allowing the police to kill them. Will appears telling them how he got the girl's body to the capital as well as getting confessions from the chemical plant employees.

A news story appears on a radio detailing the incident in town. They also mention the chemical company starting a new facility somewhere else.

== Cast ==
- Wings Hauser as Josh Cameron
- Bo Hopkins as Sheriff Will Stewart
- Jody Medford as Holly Pierce
- Lee Montgomery as Mike Cameron
- Marc Clement as Albert Hogue
- Cary Guffey as Billy
- Jennifer Warren as Dr. Myra Tate
- Danny Nelson as Jack
- Mary Nell Santacroce as Mrs. Mapes
- Stuart Culpeper as Mel
- Johnny Popwell, Sr. as Dawson
- Ralph Redpath as Victor "Vic"
- Larry Quackenbush as Harve
- Tina Kincaide as Judy Ann
- Lit Connah as Mrs. Miller
- Wallace Wilkinson as Mr. Miller

== Production ==
During production, Mutant went through several title changes including Night Shadows and Toxic Waste as well as differing approaches to the material. Mark Rosman was originally hired to direct but was falling behind schedule due to his precise and methodical shooting approach that also removed flexibility during the editing process. Producer Edward L. Montoro then sent in John "Bud" Cardos to shadow Rosman before eventually hiring Cardos to replace him with Cardos given only a day's worth of prep time. Cardos had previously stepped in for Tobe Hooper on the troubled horror production, The Dark, another Film Ventures International production.

== Home media ==
The film was available on CED in the 1980s. The film is available on DVD from several different distributors. DVDs released by both Elite Entertainment and Genius Products, under license from Liberation Entertainment, each show the film in widescreen. In the United Kingdom, a DVD was made available from Hollywood DVD. A second DVD was released in the UK from Boulevard Entertainment on April 2, 2007. It has been released on a European region free Blu-ray with no special features. In 2016 American company Code Red films released a limited edition restored 4K transfer of the film on Blu-ray. Special features include an on-camera interview with actors Bo Hopkins and Lee Montgomery, an audio commentary with Lee Montgomery, Igo Kantor and director John Bud Cardos, and the original theatrical trailer. The film is also on the "200 Tales of Terror" DVD set released by Mill Creek Entertainment.

== Soundtrack ==
The film score by Richard Band was released by Perseverance Records on April 28, 2008. It is an expanded release of the original score album, released by Intrada Records in 1993 (previously available as an LP for Varèse Sarabande). The score, performed by the National Philharmonic Orchestra, has been highly acclaimed over the years for its massive size, often lyrical scope and a surprisingly melodic nature.

== Reception ==
Writing in The Zombie Movie Encyclopedia, Peter Dendle called it a "fairly humorless and uncomplicated zombie invasion exercise" that is "derivative and unnecessary".

The movie was riffed on May 7, 2012 by Michael J. Nelson, Kevin Murphy & Bill Corbett of Rifftrax.

The film holds a 20% on Rotten Tomatoes based on 5 reviews.
