= Film Ventures International =

American film production company and distributor

- Industry: Entertainment
- Founded: 1968
- Defunct: 1985
- Fate: Bankruptcy
- Headquarters: Atlanta, Georgia
- Key people: Edward L. Montoro
- Products: Motion pictures

Film Ventures International (FVI) was an independent film production and distribution company originally located in Atlanta, Georgia, during the 1970s. FVI garnered a notorious reputation within the industry for producing films that were highly derivative of many blockbusters of the era. The company mainly specialized in producing and distributing B movies and horror fare.

== History ==
The entrepreneur who spearheaded the company was Edward L. Montoro. He wrote, directed, and produced the company's first feature film Getting Into Heaven in 1968. The adult film was made for $13,000 and grossed almost 20 times its cost.

FVI was known for acquiring Italian genre films and distributing them within the United States. These films included the 1968 spaghetti Western Boot Hill, a sequel to the famous Trinity films, and the 1974 horror thriller Beyond the Door starring Juliet Mills.

FVI acquired Beyond the Door for $100,000 and the film went on to earn $9 million at the box office, making it one of the most successful independent releases of that year. Detailing a woman possessed by a demon, Beyond the Door was labeled a rip-off of The Exorcist. Warner Bros. promptly filed a lawsuit, claiming copyright infringement. The lawsuit failed after it was determined Warner Bros. had no rights to key horror scenes depicted in The Exorcist.

FVI produced and distributed Grizzly in 1976, one of the first of the Jaws imitations. Montoro financed the film for $750,000 and it was directed by William Girdler. Grizzly was a surprise hit, earning more than $39 million and becoming the most financially successful independent film of 1976. Montoro decided to keep the profits for himself, resulting in a lawsuit against FVI by Girdler and producer/screenwriters Harvey Flaxman and David Sheldon. FVI eventually returned the profits to the filmmakers. Montoro's FVI worked with Girdler on the animal horror thriller Day of the Animals the following year, though this collaboration did not achieve the success of Grizzly.

Montoro eventually moved FVI's headquarters to Hollywood and began churning out multiple genre films over the next seven years, including Search and Destroy (1979) starring Don Stroud, The Dark (1979) starring William Devane, The Visitor (1979) starring Glenn Ford, H. G. Wells' The Shape of Things to Come (1979) starring Jack Palance, Kill or Be Killed (1980), Kill and Kill Again (1981), the sequel to Kill or Be Killed, The Incubus (1981) starring John Cassavetes, Texas Lightning (1981) starring Cameron Mitchell, Pieces (1982) starring Christopher George, They Call Me Bruce? (1982), The Pod People (1983), Vigilante (1983) starring Robert Forster, The House on Sorority Row (1983), Mortuary (1983) starring Bill Paxton, The Power (1984), Alley Cat (1984), and Mutant (1984) starring Bo Hopkins.

== Demise ==
In 1980, FVI acquired the rights to the Italian film Great White, a thinly veiled Jaws rip-off starring James Franciscus and Vic Morrow. Montoro and FVI spent over $4 million in advertising in the U.S., but Universal Pictures promptly filed a lawsuit, claiming that the film was too derivative of Jaws. Universal won the lawsuit and Great White was pulled from the theaters after just one week of release. The failure of Great White was a major monetary loss for FVI.

By 1984, FVI was on the verge of collapse due to multiple financial issues, including the release failure of Great White, the poor box-office performance of the studio's final film Mutant, and a pending divorce settlement of Montoro's. Surprising many within the industry, Montoro took $1 million from FVI and vanished, never to be seen again. Film Ventures International officially closed its doors in 1985, filing Chapter 11 bankruptcy, and later being purchased by the INI Entertainment Group. Montoro's whereabouts remain unknown to this day, though it is believed he fled to Mexico.

In 1987, Film Ventures International attempted to return to film production with a co-venture of April Films to set up a film project called The Prank, and received a three-picture co-production deal over the next 12 months and with the acquisition of co-production and distribution of other ventures, after becoming a subsidiary of INI Entertainment Group (at that time it was called Independent Network Inc.). That year, Film Ventures International acquired the rights to two feature films, namely Operation: Take No Prisoners and Phantom Empire, two of the action films that were churned out for a ten-picture acquisition and in-house production blueprint for the next twelve months, slated to go through 1988.

== In other media ==
Some of their films, including fan favorites Pod People and Cave Dwellers, were eventually riffed by the cult TV series Mystery Science Theater 3000.
