= Edward L. Montoro =

American film producer (born 1936)

- Born: January 2, 1936; Cleveland, Ohio, U.S.
- Disappeared: 1984
- Status: Missing for 42 years and 26 days
- Occupations: Film producer, film distributor, screenwriter

Edward L. Montoro (born January 2, 1936) was an American film producer and distributor known for releasing exploitation films and B-movies during the 1970s and 1980s through his company Film Ventures International. Montoro became notorious for producing and promoting films such as Beyond the Door (1974) and Grizzly (1976) which were highly derivative of the 1970s blockbuster hits The Exorcist and Jaws, respectively.

== Biography ==
Montoro had dreams of becoming an airline pilot, but his dreams were cut short following an airplane crash in 1968. Montoro formed Film Ventures International (FVI), a small-scale independent movie production and distribution company, in 1968 in Atlanta, Georgia. His first effort was the softcore comedy Getting into Heaven starring Uschi Digard, which he wrote, produced, and directed with a budget of $13,000. The film grossed almost 20 times its cost. Montoro expanded FVI and began churning out successful B-movies, among them acquisitions of foreign films from Italy including the spaghetti Western Boot Hill in 1969.

Grizzly was one of the first films Montoro financed and distributed himself. Produced on a $750,000 budget, the animal horror thriller became the most successful independent motion picture of 1976, earning more than $39 million worldwide. Montoro followed this success producing and releasing such films as Day of the Animals (1977) starring Christopher George and Leslie Nielsen; The Dark (1979) starring William Devane; The Visitor (1979) starring Glenn Ford; Kill and Kill Again (1981); Pieces (1982); The Pod People (1983); Mortuary (1983), starring Bill Paxton; Vigilante (1983) starring Robert Forster; and Mutant (1984) starring Bo Hopkins.

In 1980, after acquiring the Italian film Great White, another film regarded as a Jaws rip-off, Montoro was sued by Universal Pictures because it was too derivative of the Steven Spielberg-directed hit. Great White had a large advertising budget of $4 million and achieved commercial success during its first week at the theaters. Nevertheless, Universal Pictures won the lawsuit and the film was immediately pulled from theatrical release.

== Disappearance ==
In 1984, Film Ventures International was on the verge of collapse due to financial issues including the release failure of Great White, the poor box-office performance of Montoro's final film Mutant, and his pending divorce settlement. Montoro eventually embezzled over $1 million from the FVI bank accounts and vanished, never to be seen again. Film Ventures International officially closed in 1985. Montoro's whereabouts remain unknown, though it is believed he fled to Mexico in early 1987 under a false name. It is not even known if he is still alive.

== See also ==
- List of fugitives from justice who disappeared
