= Adventure in Satan's Canyon =

1974 Disney television film

- Genre: Adventure
- Directed by: William Beaudine Jr.
- Starring: Richard Jaeckel
- Country of origin: United States
- Original language: English

Production
- Editor: Norman R. Palmer
- Production company: Walt Disney Productions

Original release
- Network: NBC
- Release: November 3, 1974

Adventure in Satan's Canyon is a 1974 American television film produced by Walt Disney Productions for The Wonderful World of Disney. Directed by William Beaudine Jr., it originally aired on NBC on November 3, 1974.

The film was edited by Norman R. Palmer

It was filmed in the Cascade Range, and on Snake River and Stanislaus River.

The film featured the song "A Million Miles", written by Shane Tatum and performed by Michael Dees.

The Robesonian said it had a "dramatic storyline" with "spectacular wilderness footage", while The Sentinel described it as "a kayak student races with death to rescue his coach".

The Town Talk felt that "kayaking is the star" and "the scenic views are worth seeing", while another review felt "the beautiful mountain scenery of the Great Northwest is the real star".

The film was released on Walt Disney Home Video as a double feature with Fire on Kelly Mountain.

== Cast ==
The cast includes:

- Richard Jaeckel as Jack Hughes
- Larry Pennell as Dave Fletcher
- David Alan Bailey as Rob
