= Grizzly II: Revenge =

2020 film by André Szöts

- Film poster
- Directed by: André Szöts
- Written by: David Sheldon; Joan McCall
- Screenplay by: David Sheldon; Joan McCall
- Produced by: Suzanne Csikos Nagy
- Starring: Steve Inwood; Deborah Raffin; Louise Fletcher; John Rhys-Davies; Dick Anthony Williams; Edward Meeks; Deborah Foreman; Nigel Dolman; George Clooney; Laura Dern; Charlie Sheen
- Cinematography: Jean Badal
- Edited by: Alec Styborski; Brandon Adler; Matthew A. Handal; Paris Eclair Lab
- Production companies: GBGB International; Hollywood West Entertainment
- Distributed by: Gravitas Ventures
- Release dates: February 17, 1983 (Hollywood Reel); January 8, 2021 (VOD)
- Running time: 74 minutes
- Country: United States
- Language: English

Grizzly II: Revenge (sometimes stylized Grizzly II. Revenge, also known as Grizzly II: The Predator and Grizzly II. The Concert) is a 1983 American action thriller horror film that was not properly released until 2020. It was directed by André Szöts and is a sequel to the 1976 film Grizzly directed by William Girdler and David Sheldon. The film is about a giant grizzly named Tawanda who seeks revenge after her cub is killed by poachers. It stars Steve Inwood, Louise Fletcher, John Rhys-Davies, Deborah Raffin and Deborah Foreman; actors George Clooney, Laura Dern, and Charlie Sheen, who were all relatively unknown at the time, all had small roles in the film.

Originally filmed in Hungary in 1983, the release was put on hold for many decades. The film premiered at the 2020 Hollywood Reel Independent Film Festival and was released on January 8, 2021, through video-on-demand.

== Plot ==
In the vast Yellowstone National Park, grizzly bears and other wildlife roam free while hikers and campers abound. The National Park Service is charged with the protection of the park and its wildlife, and the rangers are always on the lookout for poachers. The park is preparing for a major rock concert to be held over three days in Grover Meadows and expects 50,000 people in attendance. At the ranger station, Chief Ranger Nick Hollister is briefing the rangers on the upcoming event.

A poacher, named Harvey, is hunting for a grizzly bear and ends up killing the cub and wounding its mother. The grizzly bear, seeking revenge, viciously attacks and kills Harvey. Nick and Pete, the Head Park Ranger, relay the news to Eileene Draygon, the Superintendent of Summit. They press Draygon to halt the concert for everyone’s safety, but Draygon declines to get involved.

Back at the ranger station, Samantha Owens, director of Bear Management, is adamantly opposed to killing the grizzly bear. She insists on locating the bear and tranquilizing and relocating it with the help of Bouchard, the world-famous grizzly expert from Canada. Three teenagers, named Ron, Tina and Lance are hiking through the park to the concert. They enter grizzly territory, which is restricted, and set up camp without any clue of the terror they will face. Later, that, evening, they are attacked and killed by the grizzly bear.

The next morning, Nick, Pete and Samantha find the bodies of Ron, Tina and Lance, which heightens concern for the concert scheduled the next day. Nick demands that his men find and kill the grizzly bear. Running out of options, Nick drives to see Draygon and gives her a report on the new killings. Nick again asks for help, but Draygon again refuses. Meanwhile, in the forest, Pete finds the other poachers and wants to take them into custody. Instead, they attack Pete, leaving him unconscious. The grizzly bear finds Pete and chases him into a cave, where she kills him.

As concert day comes, Charlie, the concert manager makes the final arrangements. Large crowds are arriving. Meanwhile, the poachers are also creating traps by digging large holes and planting sharp and deadly sticks into them. The grizzly bear roams the forest, finds the poachers and kills them easily. The chase then continues; Nick and Samantha, the rangers, and Bouchard, all scatter to track down the grizzly bear. The grizzly bear finds its way to the concert grounds. The concert goes on and the crowd enjoys the cutting-edge English rock bands.

Backstage, Bouchard encounters the grizzly bear and stabs at her, but the grizzly swipes Bouchard with her arm and kills him. Nick has to act fast. He gets the grizzly bear's attention and lures her to her side of the concert stage containing the high voltage, which the grizzly bear falls into and is killed. Draygon acts as if the dying grizzly bear was part of the action. The concert audience cheers and applauds and does not know the truth about what happened.

== Cast ==
- Steve Inwood as Nick Hollister
- Louise Fletcher as Eileene Draygon
- John Rhys-Davies as Karl Bouchard
- Edward Meeks as Pete Taylor
- Deborah Raffin as Samantha Owens
- Dick Anthony Williams as Charlie Hill
- Deborah Foreman as Chrissy Hollister
- Nigel Dolman as Barry
- Billy Boyle as Barry’s Manager
- George Clooney as Ron
- Laura Dern as Tina
- Charlie Sheen as Lance
- Ian McNeice as Bernie
- Timothy Spall as Rob
- Valentine Monnier as Woman Reporter
- Charles Cyphers as Steve
- Mark Alaimo as Luke
- Charles Young as Drew
- Jack Starrett as Papas
- Scotty Gelt as Chris

== Production ==
The principal photography with the tentative title The Predator was completed in 1983. After the first day of principal photography, executive producer, Joseph Ford Proctor, absconded with all of the production funds, leaving the crew without little or no resources. Suzanne C. Nagy, the co-producer, found an investor, and the principal photography was able to be finished in 45 days. At a later time, she found out that Joseph Proctor was in jail for a non-related business transaction.

== Release ==
An unauthorized bootleg version with the workprint appeared on YouTube in 2007 from a low-quality VHS recording. The film's production company, GBGB International, was already working on the completion of Grizzly II: Revenge at that time. The movie was finished in January 2020 and entered into various film festivals until the company decided to enter into a licensing agreement with Gravitas Ventures. As of August 2020, Gravitas Ventures represents the movie worldwide and released the film on video on demand, DVD and Blu-ray on January 8, 2021.

Various magazines and websites such as The Ringer and Empire magazine have released articles regarding the movie's production, release halt, and the steps it took to finally give it an official release almost four decades later. Other articles and interviews published are on MovieWeb, Bloody Disgusting and Birth.Movies.Death.

== Critical reception ==
As with the first film, the critical reception was negative. On Rotten Tomatoes, the film has an approval rating of 8% based on 12 reviews, with an average rating of 2.8/10. Metacritic, which uses a weighted average, assigned the film a score of 7 out of 100, based on 8 critics, indicating "overwhelming dislike".

Dennis Harvey from Variety refers to the film as an "incomplete mess". He criticizes the top billing notices of George Clooney, Laura Dern, and Charlie Sheen despite each only appearing on screen for a few minutes and the poor-quality special effects, especially for the bear attack scenes, calling them "cheesily abrupt, poorly disguising faulty effects work". He also finds the film's music score to be random sound pieces spliced together and not coherent. Jeannette Catsoulis of the New York Times calls out the film's directing as "touching incompetence". Catsoulis finds the dialogue dopey, the tone uncertain at times and the demise of the mother bear to be disappointing and needing a better send-off.

== Film festivals ==
The film was first screened at the Hollywood Reel Independent Film Festival on February 17, 2020. Since then, the movie has been shown at various film festivals, including the Monmouth Film Festival, Lisbon International Horror Film Festival, Knoxville Horror Film Festival, Chicago International Film Festival, LA Crime and Horror Film Festival, and Popcorn Frights Film Festival.
