= Brian O'Shaughnessy (actor) =

British actor (1931–2001)

- Born: 5 May 1931; Aldershot, Hampshire, England, UK
- Died: 19 June 2001 (aged 70); Cape Town; South Africa
- Years active: 1965–2000

Brian O'Shaughnessy (5 May 1931 – 19 June 2001) was a British-born film actor. He was born in Aldershot, Hampshire, in 1931, but was evacuated during the Second World War to South Africa, where he later found fame as an actor.

== Selected filmography ==
=== Film ===
- Stropers van die Laeveld (1962)
- Die Ruiter in die Nag (1963) - Captain Ricky
- Seven Against the Sun (1964) - Sgt. Macarthy
- Diamond Walkers (1965) - Sergeant Barrett
- African Gold (1965) - Mac
- Die Wonderwêreld van Kammie Kamfer (1965)
- Sandy the Seal (filmed in 1965, released in 1969) - Mackenzie
- Der Rivonia-Prozess (1966) - Harold Wolpe
- Kavaliers (1966) - Capt. Ronald Rogers
- The Professor and the Beauty Queen (1967) - Eric
- Rider in the Night (1968)
- Dr Kalie (1968) - Peter Vané
- Danie Bosman: Die verhaal van die grootste SA komponis (1969) - Dr. Rodney Masters
- Strangers at Sunrise (1969) - Corporal Caine
- Satan's Harvest (1970) - Andrew Murdock
- Shangani Patrol (1970) - Maj. Allan Wilson
- Mister Kingstreet's War (1971) - Morgan Kingstreet
- Pressure Burst (1971) - Ted Prentiss
- Creatures the World Forgot (1971) - Mak - The Father
- Z.E.B.R.A. (1971) - de Jager, Minister of Justice (English version) (voice, uncredited)
- The Last Lion (1972) - David Lang (voice, uncredited)
- Rogue Lion (1972) - Alec Dudley
- Met Moed, Durf en Bloed (1973) - Dr. Keith Peters (Story two: The Rough! - 'Female of the Species')
- Fraud! (1974) - Robert Curtis
- Vreemde Wêreld (1974) - Dr. Page
- Mister Deathman (1977) - Colonel Duncan
- Slavers (1978) - Dr. O'Connor
- Decision to Die (1978) - Dr. Leon Walters
- Zulu Dawn (1979) - Maj. Smith R.A.
- The Gods Must Be Crazy (1980) - Mr. Thompson
- The Gordimer Stories (1982) - Mr. Eysendyk (segment "Country Lovers")
- Claws (1982) - Bart Williams
- Go for the Gold (1984) - Stan Hopkins
- Morenga (1985) - Herr Lüdemann
- Operation Hit Squad (1987) - Richard
- Quest for Love (1988) - Brian
- The Emissary (1988) - KGB General
- White Ghost (1988) - John Enrlich
- Rage to Kill (1988) - General Hardisty
- Mutator (1989) - Axelrod
- The Evil Below (1989) - Father Shannon
- Brutal Glory (1989) - James Grouper
- That Englishwoman: An Account of the Life of Emily Hobhouse (1990) - Major
- Act of Piracy (1990) - Major Ellis
- The Power of One (1992) - Col. Bretyn
- The Visual Bible: Matthew (1993) - Pontius Pilate
- Arende (1994) - Sgt. Stewart
- Trigger Fast (1994) - Colonel Jackson
- Hearts & Minds (1995) - Col. van Vuuren
- Warhead (1996) - Gen. Edwards
- Orion's Key (1996) - Professor Morton
- Operation Delta Force 3: Clear Target (1998) - Admiral Norman Henshaw
- Falling Rocks (2000) - Pilot
- Isfahan (2001) - Carrigan (final film role)

=== Television ===
- Dr. med. Mark Wedmann - Detektiv inbegriffen (1974) - Dr. Frank
- Härte 10 (1974)
- Tatort (1976) - Piet Brügge
- The Villagers (1976)
- Pour tout l'or du Transvaal (1979) - Browels
- Auf Achse (1983) - Smidson
- Cape Rebel (1989)
- The Emissary (1989)
- Young Survivors (1990) - Diamond police
- The Fourth Reich (1990)
- Arende II (1992) - Sgt. Stewart
- Arende III (1993) - Sgt. Stewart
- Death in the Family (1993) - Frederick du Plessis
- Kap der guten Hoffnung (1997) - Ruben
- Operation Delta Force 2: Mayday (1997) - Admiral Norman Henshaw
- The Adventures of Sinbad (1997-1998) - Kasha / Omar
- CI5: The New Professionals (1999) - Mavoy
- Die Spesenritter (1999)
- Die Wüstenrose (2000) - Dr. Hermann Kummerow
- The Diamond Hunters (2001) - Michael Shapiro
