= The Big Bad Swim =

- Film poster
- Directed by: Ishai Setton
- Written by: Daniel Schechter
- Produced by: Ishai Setton; Chandra Simon
- Starring: Paget Brewster; Jeff Branson; Jess Weixler; Ricky Ullman; Liza Lapira; Avi Setton; Grant Aleksander
- Cinematography: Josh Silfen
- Edited by: Ian B. Wile
- Music by: Chad Kelly
- Release date: April 26, 2006 (Tribeca)
- Running time: 93 minutes
- Country: United States
- Language: English

The Big Bad Swim is a 2006 American independent film about a group of adults who enroll in an adult education beginner's swim class. The film takes place in southeastern Connecticut, in the town of Uncasville. It premiered at the 2006 Tribeca Film Festival and was released on DVD in North America on July 24, 2007.

== Plot ==
The film is an ensemble comedy-drama that focuses on the group of people, each of whom is afraid of the water, that join an adult swim class. Amy Pierson (Paget Brewster) is a calculus teacher going through a divorce with her husband, Paul (Grant Aleksander). Noah Owens (Jeff Branson) is the teacher of the swim class who is battling depression until he meets Jordan (Jess Weixler), a beautiful casino dealer/exotic dancer who wants to learn how to swim. Other members in the class include a cop (Kevin Porter Young), a cocky woman who already knows how to swim (Liza Lapira), and a married couple (Todd Susman and Darla Hill). Jordan's brother, David (Avi Setton) and his obnoxious friend Hunter (Ricky Ullman) are trying to make a documentary about her.

== Reception ==
Reviews for the film have been positive. As of July 2020, three of the four critics reviews on Rotten Tomatoes were positive. It won the award for Best American Independent Film at the Ft. Lauderdale International Film Festival.
