= James Ryan (actor) =

South African actor, writer and director

- Born: 15 October 1952 (age 74); South Africa
- Occupations: actor, writer and director.
- Years active: 1974-present
- Notable work: Kill or Be Killed

James Ryan is a South African actor, writer and director. Ryan played the lead in the South African made martial arts film Kill or Be Killed (1976), which became an international success. This launched Ryan as an actor, who also found success with its sequel Kill and Kill Again (1981).

Moving forward, Ryan acted in a variety of projects as well as playing lead roles in action adventures films.

== Partial career ==
In 1976, Ryan garnered international attention early in his career, starring in the film Kill or Be Killed, where he played a martial arts fighter.

In 1981, he reprised the role in Kill and Kill Again. The sequel proved a major box office success for a low-budget South African feature, reaching No. 2 on the American box office and grossing $802,900 after two weeks in American theatres.

In 1984, he had the title role in Go for the Gold which also starred Tamara Franke and Cameron Mitchell. He played the part of a long distance runner.

In 1988, he participated to two David Winters films, the space opera science fiction film Space Mutiny, and the action film Rage to Kill where he plays the lead.

That year, he acted in Pat O'Connor's The January Man.

In 1991, he wrote and starred in The Last Hero.

In 1994, he landed a role in Halifax f.p, an Australian television drama that won two Australian Film Institute awards. A year later he returned to the martial arts film genre, with a role in Redemption: Kickboxer 5.

In 1998, he appeared in the Australian television drama and sequel Halifax f.p: Afraid of the Dark; the acclaimed drama earned several Logie and Australian Film Institute nominations.

In 1999, he appeared in the sequel to From Dusk till Dawn, From Dusk till Dawn 2: Texas Blood Money.

Afterwards, he has appeared in films such as Red Lipstick, Global Effect and Sterne über Madeira, a German television two-part drama alongside fellow South African Moira Lister.

== Selected filmography ==
- La Diosa virgen (1973)
- Kill or Be Killed (1976)
- Kill and Kill Again (1981)
- Go for the Gold (1984)
- Falling in Love (1984)
- Space Mutiny (1988)
- Any Man's Death (1990)
- The January Man (1990)
- Redemption: Kickboxer 5 (1995)
- From Dusk Till Dawn 2: Texas Blood Money (1999)
- Samson (2018)
