= Day of the Animals =

1977 film by William Girdler

- Original DVD cover
- Directed by: William Girdler
- Written by: William W. Norton; Eleanor E. Norton
- Story by: Edward L. Montoro
- Produced by: Edward L. Montoro
- Starring: Christopher George; Leslie Nielsen; Lynda Day George
- Cinematography: Rober Sorrantino
- Music by: Lalo Schifrin
- Distributed by: Film Ventures International/Warner Bros.
- Release date: May 13, 1977
- Running time: 97 minutes
- Country: United States
- Budget: $1.2 million
- Box office: $7 million

Day of the Animals (re-released as Something Is Out There) is a 1977 American natural horror film directed by William Girdler, based on a story by producer Edward L. Montoro. The film reunited Girdler and Montoro with stars Christopher George and Richard Jaeckel from the previous year's Grizzly. It co-stars Lynda Day George and Leslie Nielsen.

Day of the Animals tells the story of a psychosis brought on by depletion of the Earth's ozone layer, affecting all animals at high altitudes. A group of hapless hikers must survive the animal onslaught and make their way to safety, even as the psychosis turns them against each other.

== Plot ==
The depletion of the Earth's ozone layer by aerosols has been causing increased exposure to UV radiation at high altitudes. Scientists observe that animals over 5,000 feet (1,500 m) in altitude become highly aggressive. One small-town sheriff barely escapes getting mauled to death by rats. The government orders the evacuation and quarantine of all settlements above that altitude.

In the midst of this, a group of tourists in Northern California set off on a hike through the wilderness, led by tour operator Steve Buckner and Native American guide Santee. The tourists are the bickering Mandy and Frank Young, Mrs. Shirley Goodwyn and her son John, Paul Jenson, Prof. Taylor MacGregor, young couple Bob Denning and Beth Hughes, Terry Marsh, and Roy Moore. With no way of communicating with the outside world, they are ignorant of the strange animal activity and are baffled when a wolf attacks their camp. They shrug off the incident and continue the hike, as the woodland creatures eye them menacingly.

However, Mandy (the wolf victim) and Frank are allowed to go back down the mountain. They are beset by hawks, and Mandy falls to her death as a result. Frank survives the hawk attack and finds an empty town where he picks up a little girl who was abandoned when the government quarantined her town. The two continue down the road, trying to find help.

The remaining group abandon the hike upon finding that their helicopter-dropped food cache has been raided by animals. While camping at the site of the food cache for the night, the camp is attacked by mountain lions when Jenson falls asleep while on watch. Hiker Paul Jenson, an arrogant and selfish executive, abandons Buckner and Santee and takes four of the hikers with him: Mrs. Goodwyn and her son John, and couple Bob and Beth. He hopes to find help at a Ranger station at a higher altitude; the guides take their group a less risky route down the mountain.

The hikers are not immune to the high-altitude aggression anomaly, and the now-psychopathic Jenson acts violently, yelling at and insulting his group. He then gets in a fight with his group and murders Bob in cold blood. A grizzly bear approaches as Jenson attempts to rape Beth that night and he is killed while trying to wrestle it. Mrs. Goodwyn, John, and Beth flee as Jenson is fatally mauled.

Frank and the little girl make their way to a road and the town the tour left from, finding empty houses and abandoned vehicles as well as an army truck with a dead driver. Frank tries to get his car from the hotel, leaving the girl in a junk car, but he is slaughtered by vicious dogs and venomous snakes.

John, Mrs. Goodwyn, and Beth find refuge inside an abandoned helicopter as they are attacked by wild dogs. The other group get to a town below 5,000 feet, but find it deserted. A pack of German shepherds kills Roy and the professor; Buckner leads his surviving charges into a nearby river on a makeshift raft.

The next morning, Beth, Mrs. Goodwyn, and John awaken in the downed helicopter to find the wild dogs dead; an army rescue helicopter is coming towards them. U.S. Army soldiers in hazmat gear arrive to secure the towns and find the little girl alive in the junk car. By then, almost all the animals that went mad have been killed by the same solar radiation that drove them mad. Buckner, Terry, and Santee are rescued as they float downriver to a Ranger station. At the end of the film, a surviving hawk lunges at the screen just before the credits roll.

== Cast ==
- Christopher George as Steve Buckner
- Leslie Nielsen as Paul Jenson
- Lynda Day George as Terry Marsh
- Richard Jaeckel as Prof. Taylor MacGregor
- Kathleen Bracken as Beth Hughes
- Michael Ansara as Daniel Santee
- Ruth Roman as Mrs. Shirley Goodwyn
- Bobby Porter as John Goodwyn
- Jon Cedar as Frank Young
- Paul Mantee as Roy Moore
- Walter Barnes as Ranger Tucker
- Andrew Stevens as Bob Denning
- Susan Backlinie as Mandy Young
- Michelle Stacy as the little girl

== Production ==
The budget of the production was $1.2 million and shooting took place in and around Long Barn, California, Murphy, California and Sonora, California on Todd-AO 35 film, with the cast recalling that they had a good time. Lynda Day George, an outspoken activist about the depletion of the ozone layer, also saw the film as a good platform for addressing the issue.

The animals for the film were trained by Monty Cox, veteran of such productions as Apocalypse Now and The Incredible Hulk, who partnered with cast member Susan Backlinie, who also doubled for Lynda Day George in some scenes. According to Leslie Nielsen, the grizzly bear was actually played by a honey bear.

== Release ==
Day of the Animals was released in U.S. theaters on May 13, 1977 and a movie tie-in novelization, written by Donald Porter, accompanied its release.

== Reception ==
Day of the Animals was mostly panned by critics for its poor special effects, goofy premise, banal execution (derivative of The Birds) and on-the-nose environmental themes.

Some critics have recommended the film to fans of natural horror and disaster films of the 1970s, with AllMovie comparing it to Kingdom of the Spiders and Frogs. Additionally, the film has a cult following among many who saw it at a young age.

On Rotten Tomatoes, the film holds a 40% rating, based on 5 reviews.

== Home video ==
The film was first released on VHS by Media Home Entertainment in pan-and-scan format. Media Blasters released the film on DVD on April 25, 2006, under its "Shriek Show" imprint, featuring interviews with actors Jon Cedar and Paul Mantee integrated into a featurette.

Scorpion Releasing released a Blu-ray and a second DVD in November 2013, featuring extended versions of the Media Blasters interviews, a soundtrack isolating Schifrin's score and the original TV spot. Katarina Waters hosted an introductory "Katarina's Nightmare Theater" segment.

On March 24, 2017, Rifftrax released a VOD of the film with comedic commentary by Michael J. Nelson, Kevin Murphy and Bill Corbett.

In 2021, it was re-released Region Free on DVD and Blu-ray by Severin Films.

== See also ==
- Dark Night of the Scarecrow, a 1981 TV horror film
- Grizzly
- Wild Beasts
- Zoombies
