= Murder in Mind (film) =

- Directed by: Andrew Morahan
- Written by: Michael Cooney
- Produced by: Jeremy Paige; Vicki Slotnick
- Starring: Nigel Hawthorne; Mary-Louise Parker; Jimmy Smits; Gailard Sartain; Jason Scott Lee
- Cinematography: John Aronson
- Edited by: Andrea MacArthur
- Music by: Paul Buckmaster
- Production companies: Lakeshore Entertainment; Evergreen Entertainment; BBC Films; Alva Motion Pictures; Storyteller Films
- Distributed by: LIVE Entertainment
- Release date: April 14, 1997
- Running time: 88 minutes
- Country: United States
- Language: English

Murder in Mind is a 1997 direct-to-video crime film directed by Andrew Morahan.

== Plot summary ==
A woman is hypnotized in an effort to reveal the identity of a murderer who could be the woman herself.

== Characters ==
- Nigel Hawthorne as Dr. Ellis
- Mary-Louise Parker as Caroline Walker
- Jimmy Smits as Peter Walker
- Jason Scott Lee as Holloway
- Gailard Sartain as Charlie
- Mitch Ward as Court Clerk
- Jon Cedar as superior officer
- Ingo Neuhaus as Officer
- Art Metrano as Judge
- Rob LaBelle as Lecturer
- Eric Cadora as Secretary #2, Patrick
