= Any Man's Death =

1990 film by Tom Clegg

- Directed by: Tom Clegg
- Written by: Iain Roy
- Produced by: John Karie; Debi Nethersole
- Starring: John Savage; William Hickey
- Cinematography: Vincent G. Cox
- Music by: Jeremy Lubbock
- Release date: 1990
- Language: English
- Budget: $9 million

Any Man's Death is a 1990 South African thriller drama film directed by Tom Clegg and starring John Savage, William Hickey, Mia Sara and Ernest Borgnine.

== Plot ==
An investigative journalist is sent to the volatile frontiers of Angola and South West Africa (Namibia) to investigate the disappearance of a photographer during the South African Border War. He eventually stumbles across an unrepentant Nazi war criminal who researches local snake venom in the hopes of finding a cancer cure.

== Cast ==
- John Savage as Leon Abrahams
- William Hickey as Erich Schiller / Ernst Bauricke
- Mia Sara as Gerlind
- Michael Lerner as Herb Denner
- Ernest Borgnine as Herr Gantz
- Tobie Cronje as Johann
- Damarob as Oskar
- Sam Barnard as Captain Jacobs
- James Ryan as David Caplan
- Jeff Fannell as Greenlow
- Robin Smith as Ulrich
- Claudia Udy as Laura
- Nancy Mulford as Tara
