= Project Kill =

1976 action film by William Girdler

Project: Kill
- DVD cover
- Directed by: William Girdler
- Written by: David Sheldon; Galen Thompson
- Produced by: Frank Johnson; David Sheldon; Fred C. Soriano Jr. Herman Weist
- Starring: Leslie Nielsen; Gary Lockwood; Nancy Kwan; Vic Silayan; Vic Díaz
- Cinematography: Frank E. Johnson
- Edited by: Terence Anderson; Chuck McClelland
- Music by: Robert O. Ragland; Sid Wayne
- Distributed by: Troma Entertainment
- Release date: October 1976
- Running time: 90 min.
- Country: United States
- Language: English

Project: Kill is a 1976 American action film directed by William Girdler starring Leslie Nielsen before he began doing comedies. It is distributed by Troma Entertainment and Digiview Productions and was filmed in the Philippines in 1975.

== Plot ==
Nielsen plays John Trevor, who for six years has been training and leading a team of highly trained special forces men (Code Name: Project: Kill) whose performance is enhanced by drugs. Over time Trevor realises that his men, who work independently, are being used as assassins rather than to protect government installations and individuals.

Trevor relates his worries to his second-in-command Frank Lassiter (Gary Lockwood), then decides to escape from his secret government base to the Philippines where two of his former comrades in arms reside. However, withdrawal from the mind-control drugs turn Trevor violent and dangerous, and now Lassiter must find him before he can do any real damage. Filipino criminal boss Alok Lee (Vic Díaz) learns of Trevor's arrival and has been paid to capture him and sell him to a foreign power so they may discover and duplicate the drugs and training given to Trevor's force.

== Cast ==
- Leslie Nielsen as John Trevor
- Gary Lockwood as Frank Lassiter
- Nancy Kwan as Lee Su
- Vic Silayan as Chief Insp. Cruz
- Vic Diaz as Alok Lee
- Galen Thompson as Carl Wagner
- Maurice Downs as Hook
- Pamela Parsons as Lynn Walker
- Carlos Salazar as Insp. Ortiz
- ranco Zarrate as Lung Set

== Soundtrack ==
The movie features one live song entitled: The Lonely World. The song was written by Sid Wayne.

== Home media ==
The movie was released on DVD in 2004.

== Translations ==
- Finland: Tehtävä: Tapa (video title)
- Finland: Tehtävänä: Tappaa
- U.S.: The Guardian (pre-release title)
- U.S.: Total Control (video title)
