= Kill or Be Killed (1976 film) =

1980 film directed by Ivan Hall

- Theatrical release poster
- Directed by: Ivan Hall
- Written by: C.F. Beyers-Boshoff
- Produced by: Ben Vlok
- Starring: James Ryan
- Cinematography: Manie Botha
- Edited by: Hillary Malebysse-Smith; Brian Varaday
- Production company: Kavalier Films
- Distributed by: Film Ventures International
- Release date: 17 June 1976
- Running time: 94 minutes
- Countries: South Africa; United States
- Language: English
- Box office: $6.8 million

Kill or Be Killed (Karate Killer in the US and Karate Olympiad in South Africa) is a 1976 South African-American martial arts film directed by Ivan Hall and starring James Ryan. Filmed on location, it was retitled Kill or Be Killed in the United States in 1980 to capitalize on the popularity of American genre films.

== Plot ==
A famous martial artist, Steve Hunt, travels to the desert for what he thinks is an Olympic-style competition. The competition turns out to be a trap set by Baron von Rudloff, an ex-Nazi general who is still bitter over the humiliating defeat of his martial arts team at the 1936 Summer Olympics by Japanese martial artist Miyagi, who bribed the judges with diamonds at the time. Steve wants to escape when his girlfriend and fellow karateka, Olga, is deemed unsuitable to continue as part of von Rudloff's team. However, when von Rudloff's sympathetic dwarf henchman Chico is assaulted by von Rudloff's fighters, Steve helps Chico, who sees the good in Steve and decides to help him and Olga escape. When Steve and Olga make their escape, von Rudloff sends Chico to travel around the world to recruit the best fighters for his team. Meanwhile, von Rudloff hires Ruell to kidnap Olga, who is now training with her teacher Lorraine, in an effort to get Steve back on his team. However, Miyagi learns of Steve's dilemma and offers him a chance to return, but as a member of his team. Steve accepts the offer and both teams begin their training for the competition.

Steve returns, but as a member of Miyagi's team. When the tournament begins, Steve finds himself at constant odds with von Rudloff. During the tournament, both teams score with Miyagi relying a lot on Steve. Steve eventually exacts his revenge on Ruell. However, in the final fight of the tournament, von Rudloff forces Steve to face Olga. However, Steve has come up with a plan that is set up with some of his fellow team members to help he and Olga escape. However, despite Steve holding von Rudloff hostage, the Baron's monster fighter Luke overpowers Steve and, along with the other fighters from both sides, Steve and Olga find themselves kidnapped and held in the Baron's underground prison. Von Rudloff also learns that his henchman Chico was responsible for helping Steve and Olga and is unhappy, with Chico attempting to tell the Baron there is "victory within defeat", which the Baron refuses to admit. When the fighters, now working together, make their break out of von Rudloff's castle, Steve follows the Baron to the deserts, where he takes on Luke in the middle of the desert in a final fight. Using his skills, Steve finally defeats Luke. Baron von Rudloff finds a gun on the ground and, knowing that he cannot ever accept defeat, takes his own life.

== Cast ==
- James Ryan as Steve Hunt
- Charlotte Michelle as Olga
- Norman Coombes as Baron von Rudloff
- Raymond Ho-Tong as Miyagi
- Danie DuPlessis as Chico
- Ed Kannemeyer as Ruell
- Douglas Baggott as Luke
- Lorraine Robinson as Lorraine, Olga's teacher
- Stan Schmidt as von Rudloff's karateka
- Norman Robinson as von Rudloff's karateka
- Eddie Dorie as Miyagi's karateka
- Nigel Jackson as Miyagi's karateka
- Malcolm Dorfman as Miyagi's karateka
- Derrick Lotz as Miyagi's karateka

== Opening credits ==
The opening credits sequence features James Ryan's character Steve Hunt trying out for von Rudloff's team and the credits are superimposed on Ryan's body throughout the scene, with the exception of the film's title.

== Japanese karate ==
The fighting style in the film is a showcase of the pure style of Japanese karate, courtesy of the Japan Karate Association (South Africa). Shihans Stan Schmidt and Norman Robinson choreographed the film's karate sequences, as well as appearing in the film as two members of von Rudloff's karate team.

== Sequel ==
The film was originally released in the U.S. as Karate Killer (1976) and released in South Africa as Karate Olympiad (its title in that country in English). The film was so popular in the United States that Film Ventures International greenlit a sequel, Kill and Kill Again, starring James Ryan as martial arts champion Steve Chase, in 1981. Like its predecessor, the film's extras were real karateka from the Japan Karate Association (South Africa) with Stan Schmidt and Norman Robinson returning as karate choreographers and co-starring as two of Steve's friends.
