= Grant Aleksander =

American actor (born 1960)

- Born: Grant Aleksander Kunkowski; August 6, 1960 (age 66); Baltimore, Maryland, U.S.
- Education: Washington and Lee University
- Occupation: Actor
- Years active: 1982–present
- Spouse: Sherry Ramsey (m.1987)

Grant Aleksander (born Grant Aleksander Kunkowski; August 6, 1960) is an American actor. He is best known for playing the role of Phillip Spaulding on the CBS Daytime soap opera Guiding Light, off and on from 1982 until the show's cancellation in 2009. He received a Soap Opera Digest Award and four Daytime Emmy Award nominations for his role on Guiding Light.

== Early life ==
Aleksander was born in Baltimore, Maryland and raised in Timonium. He is the youngest of three sons. He attended McDonogh School, where he played football. He became interested in acting after a drama teacher encouraged him to try out for a school play. After high school, he enrolled at Washington and Lee University, where he starred in productions of The Owl and the Pussycat, The Glass Menagerie, The Crucible, and Hamlet. He also appeared on stage in Baltimore, starring in The Prime of Miss Jean Brodie and Cat on a Hot Tin Roof. He left Washington and Lee to study at New York University and the Circle in the Square Theatre. He eventually returned to Washington and Lee, earning his Bachelor of Arts Degree in Theatre in 2012.

== Career ==
After moving to New York, Aleksander worked as a waiter and tried modeling. He appeared in an ABC Afterschool Special, A Very Delicate Matter, in 1982. He landed his big break when he was cast as Phillip Spaulding on Guiding Light. He initially played the role from 1982 to 1984, before leaving to pursue other opportunities.

Aleksander landed guest starring roles on Hardcastle and McCormick, Who's the Boss?, and The Fall Guy. He appeared in the TV movie Dark Mansions and the film Tough Guys. Returning to soaps, he had a brief stint as DJ Phillips on Capitol in 1986.

He returned to Guiding Light as Phillip Spaulding in 1986 and stayed until early 1991. He decided to leave due to burn out from the show's fast paced schedule, as well as grief from the recent deaths of his parents. In 1993, Aleksander joined the cast of the ABC Daytime soap opera All My Children as Alec McIntyre. He stayed with AMC until 1996.

Aleksander returned to Guiding Light in 1996 and continued playing the role of Phillip until 2004, when he was abruptly dismissed from the show. Media reports speculated on a number of possible reasons, including his high salary, and allegations that Aleksander was temperamental or had been feuding with the actress who portrayed his love interest. Aleksander said the dismissal was storyline dictated.

After being killed off, it was revealed in May 2006 that Phillip Spaulding was still alive. However, the character didn't appear on camera again until Aleksander returned in February 2009. He stayed with Guiding Light until its final episodes in September 2009.

During his time away from Guiding Light, Aleksander directed episodes of As the World Turns. In 2006, he appeared in the film The Big Bad Swim, co-starring with Paget Brewster. He also had a role in Fields of Freedom, a historical film about the battle of Gettysburg. In 2008, he guest starred on Life on Mars, playing a soap opera doctor.

Aleksander joined the cast of the web series Tainted Dreams in 2013, playing Adam Clark. In late 2014, he returned to Washington and Lee University as a Guest Artist in the first "Dick Sessoms Honorary Production" of George Bernard Shaw's Mrs. Warren's Profession. Aleksander starred in Mary, Mary at Cape May Stage in 2015. He also appeared Off Broadway in Perfect Crime in May and June 2019.

== Personal life ==
Aleksander met his wife, attorney Sherry Ramsey, when they were cast in a play together as students at Washington and Lee University. They were married on September 19, 1987.

Aleksander and his wife have rescued many animals and are supporters of PETA.

== Filmography ==
=== Film ===
Year	Title	Role	Notes
1986	Tough Guys	Bartender at Mickey's	
2006	The Big Bad Swim	Paul Pierson	
2006	Fields of Freedom		

=== Television ===
Year	Title	Role	Notes
1982	ABC Afterschool Specials	Larry Milligan	Episode: "A Very Delicate Matter"
1982–2009	Guiding Light	Phillip Spaulding	Contract role
1985	Who's the Boss?	Guss McGee	Episode: "Hunk of the Month"
1985	Hardcastle and McCormick	Biff Anderson	Episode: "Mirage a Trois"
1986	The Fall Guy	Cliff	Episode: "Beach Blanket Bounty"
1986	You Again?	Waiter	Episode: "Uncle Randy"
1986	Dark Mansions	Nicholas Drake	Television film
1986	Capitol	D.J. Phillips	
1993–1996	All My Children	Alec McIntyre	Contract role
2002	A Wedding Story: Josh and Reva	Phillip Spaulding	Uncredited
2008	Life on Mars	Soap Opera Doctor	Episode: "Tuesday's Dead"

=== Web series ===
Year	Title	Role	Notes
2014-2017	Tainted Dreams	Adam Clark	12 episodes

== Awards and nominations ==
Year	Award	Category	Title	Result	Ref.
1998	Daytime Emmy Award	Outstanding Supporting Actor in a Drama Series	Guiding Light	Nominated	
1999	Soap Opera Digest Award	Favorite New Couple (Phillip and Harley)	Guiding Light	Won (Shared with Beth Ehlers)	
2003	Daytime Emmy Award	Outstanding Lead Actor in a Drama Series	Guiding Light	Nominated	
2004	Daytime Emmy Award	Outstanding Lead Actor in a Drama Series	Guiding Light	Nominated	
2005	Daytime Emmy Award	Outstanding Lead Actor in a Drama Series	Guiding Light	Nominated	
