= Kiss Daddy Goodbye =

- Theatrical release poster
- Directed by: Patrick Regan
- Written by: Ronald Abrams; Patrick Regan; Alain Silver; Mary Stewart
- Produced by: Alain Silver
- Starring: Fabian; Marilyn Burns; Jon Cedar; Marvin Miller
- Music by: David Spear
- Release date: 1981
- Running time: 92 minutes
- Country: United States
- Language: English

Kiss Daddy Goodbye, also known as Revenge of the Zombie, is a 1981 American horror film directed by Patrick Regan. The film stars Fabian, Marilyn Burns, Jon Cedar, and Marvin Miller. It is about two psychic children who avenge the death of their father.

== Plot ==
Two children who have psychic powers use them to avenge the death of their father, who was murdered by a biker gang.

== Cast ==
- Fabian as Deputy Blanchard
- Marilyn Burns as Nora Dennis
- Jon Cedar as Wally Stanton
- Marvin Miller as Bill Morris
- Patrick Regan III as Michael
- Nell Regan as Beth
- Chester Grimes as biker gang leader
- Jed Mills as biker
- Gay French as Nicky - female biker
- Robert Dryer as Billy

== Development ==
Director Patrick Regan co-wrote the script alongside Ronald Abrams, Alain Silver, and Mary Stewart. He cast his real-life children, Patrick Regan III and Nell Regan, as two of the central characters.

== Reception ==
Common elements of criticism centered upon the acting, with Glenn Kay noting that the children frequently appeared to look off camera for direction. A reviewer for Bleeding Skull wrote that the film was "like witnessing a rhinocerous ballet choreographed by self-conscious robots."
