= Jeremy Lubbock =

English pianist (1931–2021)

- Born: Jeremy Michael Lubbock; 4 June 1931; London, England
- Died: 29 January 2021 (aged 89) Oxfordshire, England
- Occupations: Musician; composer; arranger
- Instrument: Piano
- Years active: mid-1950s–2019
- Labels: Parlophone, Angel Records
- Website: jeremylubbock.coweb site not working

Jeremy Michael Lubbock (4 June 1931 – 29 January 2021) was an English pianist, conductor, orchestrator, music producer, arranger, composer, and songwriter.

== Life and career ==
Born in Kensington, London, he learned piano as a child, and discovered jazz and other American popular music in his teens. He studied architecture at Oxford University, while also occasionally performing as a jazz pianist and vocalist in clubs in London and Paris, much in the style of Nat King Cole. In the late 1950s, he made some recordings as a singer and pianist, and started a career in which he toured round the world as a performer and arranger, in which he acquired a special talent.

He moved to Los Angeles with his family in 1977, and worked on Joni Mitchell's album Mingus, and Minnie Riperton's final album Minnie. In following years, he worked with David Foster, Quincy Jones, Chicago, and many others. He won Grammy Awards for his arrangements on Chicago's "Hard Habit to Break" in 1984, Andy Williams's Close Enough For Love, in 1986, and for Celine Dion's "When I Fall in Love", from the film Sleepless in Seattle, in 1994. He also received 11 additional nominations for his arrangements. As a songwriter, Lubbock co-wrote "The Best of Me", recorded by Cliff Richard, Barry Manilow, and many others. He notably conducted and arranged the strings for Michael Jackson’s song Billie Jean.

Lubbock died in Shillingford, Oxfordshire, England, in 2021, aged 89.

== Filmography (selection) ==
- 1990: Any Man's Death
- 1996: Dear God
