= Richard Jaeckel =

American actor (1926–1997)

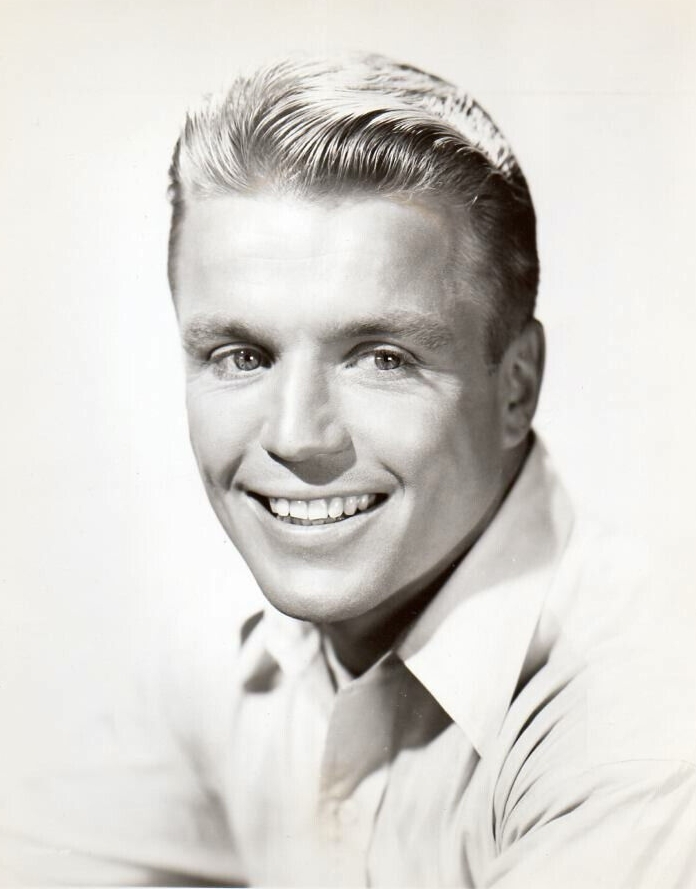
- Jaeckel in a 1953 publicity photo for Come Back, Little Sheba
- Born: R. Hanley Jaeckel; October 10, 1926; Long Beach, New York, U.S.
- Died: June 14, 1997 (aged 70); Woodland Hills, California, U.S.
- Occupation: Actor
- Years active: 1943–1994
- Spouse: Antoinette Marches (m. 1947)
- Children: 2, including Barry Jaeckel
- Military career
- Allegiance: United States
- Branch: United States Merchant Marine
- Service years: 1944–46
- Conflicts: World War II

Richard Jaeckel (born R. Hanley Jaeckel; October 10, 1926 – June 14, 1997) was an American actor. A veteran character player whose career spanned six decades, Jaeckel appeared in nearly 200 film and television roles between 1943 and 1994, and was best known for his "tough guy" roles in Westerns and war films. He was nominated for an Academy Award for Best Supporting Actor for his performance in Sometimes a Great Notion (1971).

== Early life ==
Jaeckel was born October 10, 1926, in Long Beach, New York, the son of Richard Jaeckel and Millicent Hanley. His father was active in the family's fur business, and his mother was a stage actress. His birth name was R. Hanley Jaeckel, with only the initial rather than a first name.

He attended The Harvey School and other private schools. The family lived in New York until 1934, when they moved to Los Angeles, where his father operated a branch of the family business. He graduated from Hollywood High School.

== Career ==
Jaeckel got his start in the film business at the age of 17 while he was employed as a mailboy at 20th Century Fox studios in Hollywood. A casting director auditioned him for a role in the 1943 film Guadalcanal Diary; Jaeckel won the role and settled into a lengthy career in supporting parts.

He served in the United States Merchant Marine from 1944 to 1946, then starred in two of the most remembered war films of 1949: Battleground and Sands of Iwo Jima with John Wayne. One of Jaeckel's shortest film roles was in The Gunfighter, in which his character is killed by Gregory Peck's character in the opening scene. He played the role of Turk, the roomer's boyfriend, in the Academy Award-winning 1952 film Come Back, Little Sheba, with Shirley Booth, Burt Lancaster, and Terry Moore.

In 1960, he appeared as Angus Pierce in the Western, Flaming Star, starring Elvis Presley. He played Lee Marvin's able second-in-command, Sgt. Bowren, in the 1967 film The Dirty Dozen for director Robert Aldrich, and reprised the role in the 1985 sequel, The Dirty Dozen: Next Mission. Jaeckel appeared in several other Aldrich films, including Big Leaguer (1953), Attack (1956), Ulzana's Raid (1972), and Twilight's Last Gleaming (1977).

He guest-starred in many television programs. He was cast as a boxer in a 1954 episode of Reed Hadley's CBS legal drama, Public Defender. Also in 1954, Jaeckel portrayed Billy the Kid in an episode of the syndicated Western anthology series, Stories of the Century, with Jim Davis as the fictitious Southwest Railroad detective Matt Clark. Seven years later, Jaeckel played "Denver" in "The Grudge Fight" episode of the NBC Western series The Tall Man.

In 1957, he appeared as Mort Claffey in two episodes, "Paratroop Padre" and "The Light," of the syndicated religion anthology series, Crossroads. That same year, he portrayed Lieutenant Bradshaw in episode "War of the Whale Boats" of the military drama, Navy Log. In 1956-57, he appeared in three episodes of another military drama, The West Point Story.

In 1955 and 1958, Jaeckel appeared in different roles on two episodes of CBS's fantasy drama The Millionaire. In 1958, Jaeckel guest-starred as Webb Martin in the episode "The Bloodline" of NBC's Western series Cimarron City. That same year, he appeared in the syndicated drama of the American Civil War, Gray Ghost in the episode entitled "The Hero". In 1959, he was cast as Clint Gleason in the episode "The Man Behind the Star" of CBS's The Texan Western series, starring Rory Calhoun.

In 1960, Jaeckel appeared twice on Nick Adams's ABC Western series, The Rebel, as Marshal Roader in "The Rattler" and as Clyde Traskel in "Run, Killer, Run".

During the 1961-62 season, Jaeckel had a starring role (with John Derek and Chill Wills) on CBS' Frontier Circus, an adventure drama about a one-ring circus traveling the American West during the 1880's. Jaeckel's character Tony Gentry served as an advance location scout for the circus in addition to assisting John Derek's circus manager Ben Travis. Jaeckel appeared in all 26 episodes with featured player roles in several episodes, most notably "Karina" opposite Elizabeth Montgomery.

In 1963, Jaeckel played Willie the murderer in "The Case of the Lover's Leap" on CBS's Perry Mason, starring Raymond Burr. That same year he was among the guest stars on the short-lived ABC/Warner Brothers Western series, The Dakotas and in "The Predators" episode of Have Gun – Will Travel, Season 6 (1962). Also in 1963, Jaeckel, speaking in German, played the role of Wehrmacht Sgt. Buxman in the Combat! TV series episode "Gideon's Army." Finally in that year, he guest starred in the TV Western Series Gunsmoke in the S8E27 episode "Two of a Kind", playing Irish immigrant mine owner O'Ryan, who was feuding with his partner. Jaeckel appeared in Alfred Hitchcock Presents "Incident in a Small Jail" (1961) as well as The Alfred Hitchcock Hour episodes, "Low Clouds and Coastal Fog" (1963), "Death of a Cop (1963), and "Off Season" (1965). In 1964, Jaeckel appeared as Danny in the episode "Keep Cool" of The New Phil Silvers Show and as Mitch Devlin in an episode of Bonanza, ″Between Heaven and Earth″.

In 1966, Jaeckel made a second guest appearance on Perry Mason as Mike Woods in the episode "The Case of the Bogus Buccaneers". That same year, he also co-starred as Christopher Cable in an episode – "The Night of the Grand Emir" – of The Wild Wild West. Also that year he played "Percy Farley", part of a bank robbing gang in a rare two part episode called "The Raid" on Gunsmoke. He guest-starred in 1967 as Dibbs in the episode "Night of Reckoning" on Bonanza.

Jaeckel's most famous film appearances of the 1950s are in 3:10 to Yuma (1957) and The Naked and the Dead (1958). His film career achieved its greatest success in the period 1967 to 1975, in such features as The Dirty Dozen (1967), The Devil's Brigade (1968), Chisum (1970), Sometimes a Great Notion (1971) (for which he received a nomination for the Academy Award for Best Supporting Actor), Ulzana's Raid (1972), Pat Garrett and Billy the Kid (1973), The Outfit (1973), The Drowning Pool (1975), and Walking Tall Part 2 (1975). Chisum was a John Wayne vehicle in which Jaeckel, Christopher George and Andrew Prine all co-starred in prominent supporting roles. The three would re-team six years later in Grizzly (1976) (an amiable Jaws ripoff reset in the forest) and Jaeckel and George would team again in another "nature strikes back" story, Day of the Animals (1977). In 1976, he starred in the B movie Mako: The Jaws of Death.

In 1975, he starred as the title character on the episode "Larkin" on Gunsmoke (S20E17). In 1977, Jaeckel appeared with Donna Mills, Bill Bixby, and William Shatner in the last episode, entitled "The Scarlet Ribbon", of NBC's Western series The Oregon Trail, starring Rod Taylor and Andrew Stevens. The following year he played Sergeant Lykes in the epic TV miniseries Centennial. He had a recurring role in the short-lived Andy Griffith vehicle Salvage 1 (1979).

The later films in his career included a major role in John Carpenter's 1984 film Starman as an NSA agent hunting an alien life form played by Jeff Bridges as well as in the action films Black Moon Rising with Tommy Lee Jones and Delta Force 2: The Colombian Connection with Chuck Norris. In his later years, Jaeckel was known to television audiences as Lt. Ben Edwards on Baywatch from seasons 2-4. He also played Al Gibson in the Baywatch Pilot. He also co-starred on Robert Urich's ABC series Spenser: For Hire in the role of Lieutenant Martin Quirk.

== Personal life ==
On May 29, 1947, Jaeckel married Antoinette Helen Marches in Tijuana. They had two sons, professional golfer Barry Jaeckel and Richard.

=== Death ===
Jaeckel died of cancer at the age of 70 in 1997 at the Motion Picture & Television Hospital in Woodland Hills, California.

== Partial filmography ==
=== Film ===
Year	Title	Role
1943	Guadalcanal Diary	Pvt. Johnny ('Chicken') Anderson
1944	Wing and a Prayer	Beezy Bessemer
1948	Jungle Patrol	Lt. Dick Carter
1949	City Across the River	Bull
1949	Battleground	Bettis
1949	Sands of Iwo Jima	PFC. Frank Flynn
1950	The Gunfighter	Eddie
1950	Wyoming Mail	Nate
1951	Fighting Coast Guard	Tony Jessup
1951	The Sea Hornet	Johnny Radford
1952	My Son John	Chuck Jefferson
1952	Hoodlum Empire	Ted Dawson
1952	Come Back, Little Sheba	Turk Fisher
1953	Big Leaguer	Bobby Bronson
1953	Sea of Lost Ships	Ensign H.G. 'Hap' O'Malley
1954	The Shanghai Story	'Knuckles' Greer
1955	Apache Ambush	Lee Parker
1955	The Violent Men	Wade Matlock
1956	Attack!	Pvt. Snowden
1957	3:10 to Yuma	Charlie Prince
1958	Cowboy	Paul Curtis
1958	The Lineup	Sandy MacLain
1958	The Naked and the Dead	Gallagher
1958	The Gun Runners	Buzurki
1958	When Hell Broke Loose	Karl
1960	Platinum High School	Hack Marlow
1960	The Gallant Hours	LCDR. Roy Webb
1960	Flaming Star	Angus Pierce
1961	Town Without Pity	Corporal Birdwell "Birdie" Scott
1963	The Young and The Brave	Corporal John Estway
1963	4 for Texas	Pete Mancini
1965	Nightmare in the Sun	Motorcyclist
1965	Town Tamer	Deputy Johnny Honsinger
1966	Once Before I Die	Lt. Custer
1967	The Dirty Dozen	Sgt. Clyde Bowren
1968	The Devil's Brigade	Pvt. Omar Greco
1968	The Green Slime	Commander Vince Elliott
1969	Latitude Zero	Perry Lawton
1970	Chisum	Jesse Evans
1971	Sometimes a Great Notion	Joe Ben Stamper
1972	Ulzana's Raid	The Sergeant
1973	Pat Garrett and Billy the Kid	Sheriff Kip McKinney
1973	The Outfit	Kimmie Cherney
1974	Adventure in Satan's Canyon	Jack Hughes
1974	Chosen Survivors	Major Gordon Ellis
1975	The Drowning Pool	Franks
1975	Walking Tall Part 2	Stud Pardee
1976	Grizzly	Arthur Scott
1976	Mako: The Jaws of Death	Sonny Stein
1977	Twilight's Last Gleaming	Cpt. Stanford Towne
1977	Day of the Animals	Prof. MacGregor
1977	Speedtrap	Billy
1978	Mr. No Legs	Chuck
1979	The Dark	Det. Dave Mooney
1979	Delta Fox	Santana
1980	Herbie Goes Bananas	Shepard
1981	...All the Marbles	Bill Dudley
1982	Blood Song	Frank Hauser
1982	Airplane II: The Sequel	Controller
1984	Starman	George Fox
1986	Black Moon Rising	Earl Windom
1990	Delta Force 2: The Colombian Connection	DEA Agent John Page
1990	The King of the Kickboxers	Cpt. O'Day
1993	Martial Outlaw	Mr. White

=== Television ===
Year	Title	Role	Notes
1957-1958	The Silent Service	Steve / Capt. Chester Smith	2 episodes
1960	77 Sunset Strip	Bob Bent	Episode: "The Office Caper"
1960	The Rebel	Traskel/Deputy Roader	2 episodes
1960	The Untouchables	Hans Eberhardt	Episode: "The Otto Frick Story"
1961	The Tall Man	Denver	Episode: "The Grudge Fight"
1961	Lawman	Al Janaker	Episode: "Blue Boss and Willie Shay"
1961	Alfred Hitchcock Presents	The Suspect / Mechanic	Episode: "Incident in a Small Jail"
1961–1963	Wagon Train	Barker, Bud Piper	2 episodes
1962	Have Gun – Will Travel	John Tyree	Episode: "The Predators"
1963–1965	The Alfred Hitchcock Hour	Various	3 episodes
1963–1966	Perry Mason	Willie, Mike Woods	2 episodes
1963–1975	Gunsmoke	O'Ryan, Clay Larkin	4 episodes
1964	The Outer Limits	Captain Mike Doweling	Episode: "Specimen: Unknown"
1964	The Virginian	Pat Wade	Episode: "A Matter of Destiny"
1966–1967	Bonanza	Mitch Devlin, Dibbs	2 episodes
1966–1967	The Wild Wild West	Sgt. Stryker, Christopher Cable	2 episodes
1971	The Deadly Dream	Delgreve	ABC Movie of the Week
1971	Mission: Impossible	Edward Trask	Episode: "Run for the Money"
1971–1974	The F.B.I.	Sgt. Sam Ryker, James Devlin	2 episodes
1972	Emergency!	Defense Attorney	Episode: "Kids"
1972	Ironside	Caesar	Episode: "The Countdown"
1973	Firehouse	Hank Myers	ABC Movie of the Week
1975	Cannon	Cry Carter	Episode: "The Wrong Medicine"
1976–1981	Little House on the Prairie	Murphy, Irv Hartwig	3 episodes
1976	Baretta	Downing	Episode: "Aggie"
1978	Black Sheep Squadron	Maj. John Duncan	Episode: "Iceman"
1979	Salvage 1	Jack Klinger	Main cast; Season 1
1980	Charlie's Angels	Bid Fisher	Episode: "Island Angels"
1983	Fantasy Island	Kodiak	Segment: "Operation Breakout"
1983	Dallas	A.D.A. Percy Meredith	2 episodes
1984	The Love Boat	Frank Bannon	Segment: "The Buck Stops Here"
1984	Masquerade	William Tucker	Episode: "Spanish Gambit"
1985	The Dirty Dozen: Next Mission	Sgt. Clyde Bowren	TV movie
1985–1987	Spenser: For Hire	Lt. Martin Quirk	47 episodes
1987	Murder, She Wrote	Dr. Leon Chatsworth	Episode: "The Way to Dusty Death"
1991–1994	Baywatch	Ben Edwards	28 episodes

== Awards and nominations ==
Award	Year	Category	Work	Result	Ref.
Academy Award	1972	Best Supporting Actor	Sometimes a Great Notion	Nominated	
Golden Boot Award	1992	—N/a	—N/a	Won	
