= Dark Mansions =

- Genre: Thriller
- Written by: Anthony Lawrence; Nancy Lawrence; Robert McCullough
- Directed by: Jerry London
- Starring: Joan Fontaine; Michael York; Linda Purl; Paul Shenar; Melissa Sue Anderson; Lois Chiles; Steve Inwood; Nicollette Sheridan; Raymond St. Jacques; Grant Aleksander; Yves André Martin; Dan O'Herlihy
- Music by: Ken Harrison
- Country of origin: United States
- Original language: English

Production
- Executive producers: Douglas S. Cramer; Aaron Spelling
- Producers: Jerry London; Robert McCullough
- Production locations: Mendocino, California; Greystone Park & Mansion - 905 Loma Vista Drive, Beverly Hills, California
- Cinematography: Paul Lohmann
- Editors: Benjamin A. Weissman; John Woodcock
- Running time: 100 minutes
- Production company: Aaron Spelling Productions

Original release
- Network: ABC
- Release: August 23, 1986

Dark Mansions is a 1986 television film starring Joan Fontaine, Michael York, Linda Purl, Paul Shenar, Melissa Sue Anderson, Steve Inwood, Lois Chiles, Nicollette Sheridan, Raymond St. Jacques, Grant Aleksander, Yves André Martin, and Dan O'Herilhy.

Produced by Aaron Spelling and Douglas S. Cramer, Dark Mansions was shot as a pilot for a potential TV series cross between Dynasty and Dark Shadows. The project was not ordered to series, and aired as a television movie. It was directed by Jerry London and written by Anthony Lawrence, Nancy Lawrence and Robert McCullough.

== Plot ==
Hired to interview and write a book about Margaret Drake, biographer Shellane Victor comes to the Drake estate, where family members notice her resemblance to their deceased relative, Yvette. The Drakes believe that Yvette, who died after falling off of a cliff, is haunting the mansion.

== Cast and characters ==
- Joan Fontaine as Margaret Drake
- Michael York as Jason Drake
- Linda Purl as Shellane Victor
- Paul Shenar as Philip Drake
- Melissa Sue Anderson as Noelle Drake
- Lois Chiles as Jessica Drake
- Steve Inwood as Jerry Mills
- Nicollette Sheridan as Banda Drake
- Raymond St. Jacques as Davis
- Grant Aleksander as Nicholas Drake
- Yves André Martin as Cody Drake
- Dan O'Herlihy as Alexander Drake
