= Jon Cedar =

American actor

- Born: January 22, 1931; Detroit, Michigan, United States
- Died: April 14, 2011 (aged 80); Los Angeles, California, United States
- Resting place: Groman Eden Mortuary, Mission Hills, California
- Occupation: Actor
- Spouse: Barbara
- Children: 2

Jon Cedar (January 22, 1931 – April 14, 2011) was an American actor. He appeared in more than sixty television and film roles during his career.

== Career ==
Cedar began his acting career in high school theater productions at Detroit High School. He enlisted in the U.S. military and served in Italy during the Korean War. Cedar moved to Hollywood after leaving the military. Cedar toured the United States with his family, appearing in traveling musical and touring off-Broadway productions. His stage credits during this time included the national tours of South Pacific, Irma La Douce and The Deputy. He also joined the theatre troupe, the Players Ring, based in Hollywood, with his brother, George Cedar.

Cedar had a recurring role as the timid Corporal Karl Langenscheidt on the television series, Hogan's Heroes from 1965 to 1971. (In 1967, in the episode "Two Nazi for the Price of One" his character was "Mannheim". and in 1971, in the episode "That's No Lady, That's My Spy" his character was "Oskar Danzig".) His other television roles included Matlock, Starsky and Hutch, Barnaby Jones, Kojak, Ben Casey, The Greatest American Hero, Moonlighting, The Rockford Files, Murder, She Wrote, Tales from the Darkside "Dream Girl" episode (1986) as Sid and the 1987 film In Love and War. His last television appearance was in an episode of The Inside in 2005.

Cedar was a co-star, co-screenwriter and associate producer on the 1978 horror film The Manitou, which starred Tony Curtis. His additional film credits included Little Cigars (1973), The Execution of Private Slovik (1974), Foxy Brown (1974), Day of the Animals (1977), Capricorn One (1978), The Concorde ... Airport '79 (1979), Death Hunt (1981), Kiss Daddy Goodbye (1981), and Messenger of Death (1988). His last film role was in the 1997 film Murder in Mind.

== Personal life and death ==
He and his late wife, Barbara Cedar, owned and operated a script typing company, Barbara's Place, during the 1970s and 1980s. In the 1990s he coached actors at Theater Theater in Hollywood, California, including Chris Aable who introduced him to fellow actors who also became students of Cedar, Gedde Watanabe and Steve Burton.

Jon Cedar died of leukemia at Providence Tarzana Medical Center in Los Angeles on April 14, 2011, at the age of 80. He was predeceased by his wife, Barbara. Cedar was survived by his daughter, actress Loren Thompson; son, producer Michael Cedar; companion, Elynore Leigh; brother, actor George Cedar; and Larry Cedar. His memorial service was held at the Groman Eden Mortuary in Mission Hills, California.

== Filmography ==
Year	Title	Role	Notes
1963	The Quick and the Dead	Lt. Rogers	
1964	Shell Shock		
1965-1971	Hogan's Heroes	Cpl. Langenscheidt & Other Characters	17 episodes
1973	Little Cigars	Faust	
1974	The Execution of Private Slovik	Holloway	Television film
1974	Foxy Brown	Dr. Chase	
1976	Swashbuckler	Pirate Gun Captain	
1977	Day of the Animals	Frank Young	
1977-1982	The Incredible Hulk	Sam Egan	
1978	Capricorn One	F.B.I. Man Number 1	
1978	The Manitou	Dr. Jack Hughes	
1979	The Concorde... Airport '79	Froelich	
1981	Death Hunt	Hawkins	
1981	Kiss Daddy Goodbye	Wally Stanton	
1983	Second Thoughts	Prosecutor	
1985	Diff'rent Strokes	Security Guard	1 episode
1988	Messenger of Death	Saul	
1988	Feds	Senior Agent	
1992	Interceptor	Elliot	
1994	Body Shot	Senator Stanford Holliday	
1997	Murder in Mind	Superior Officer	
