= Kill and Kill Again =

- Theatrical release poster
- Directed by: Ivan Hall
- Screenplay by: John M. Crowther
- Produced by: Igo Kantor
- Starring: James Ryan; Anneline Kriel; Michael Mayer
- Cinematography: Tai Krige
- Edited by: Peter Thornton; Robert Leighton
- Production company: Film Ventures International
- Distributed by: Film Ventures International
- Release date: 8 May 1981 (New York)
- Running time: 100 minutes
- Countries: South Africa; United States
- Box office: $7 million

Kill and Kill Again is a 1981 action film directed by Ivan Hall. The film stars James Ryan as Steve Chase who is hired to save the scientist Horatio Kane, who has been kidnapped by the villain Marduk. Chase gathers together a team of mercenaries who find their way to the villain's stronghold and then find themselves fighting for their lives as they are captured.

Kill and Kill Again is a sequel to the film Kill or Be Killed and began filming in June 1980. The film was shot in Europe and the United States with the cast predominantly being from South Africa. It was released in New York on May 8, 1981. It received negative reviews from Variety and The New York Times who found the film "unexciting" and with a "horrible plot", respectively.

== Plot ==
Martial arts champion Steve Chase is hired by Kandy Kane to rescue her father, Dr. Horatio Kane, who had accidentally discovered a mind-control drug while researching potatoes as an energy source. The government offers Steve $2 million to find him, but he gets $5 million and is allowed to select his own team. He recruits four of his old friends: a mystic known as the Fly, a reclusive former martial arts champ named Gypsy Billy, a large former wrestler named Gorilla, and a goofy cheerful fellow called Hot Dog.

The government officials brief them on their mission: Wellington Forsyth III, a billionaire who supposedly disappeared years ago, now calls himself Marduk (MAR-dook); they believe he kidnapped Kane for his mind-control drug to create an army with the intention of totalitarianism. Having seized control of a town called Ironville, Marduk is now a warlord with many followers under his control from Kane's drug (which has to be re-administered when it wears off). They want Steve and his team to stop Marduk's plans and rescue Kane. When Kandy insists on joining them, Steve eventually relents when she reveals that she too can fight.

In his fortress, Marduk seeks a challenger for his undefeated champion, the Optimus, a large man who fights with raw power. Steve and his group wrangle their way into Ironville only to be captured by Marduk's guards, and are each forced to fight members of his army. They all best their respective opponents, including Steve who defeats the Optimus. Marduk then forces Steve to drink a new serum and orders him to kill his friends, but the serum fails (Steve having received an antidote to the drug in advance from Dr. Kane, who had been concealing the fact of his own resistance from Marduk) and Steve forces Marduk to declare everyone free and destroy him instead. Chaos erupts, and Steve eventually saves Kane from being shot by Marduk's top guard. Marduk tries to escape via helicopter, but cannot take off with Gorilla holding one of the rotors. The remaining guards open fire on Gorilla, but end up hitting the helicopter, which explodes with Marduk still on board.

Kandy later reveals that she was actually an undercover government agent, and the real Kandy Kane, formerly under Marduk's control, has been reunited with her father, who decides to stay behind to give his antidote to everyone else affected, and the heroes head for home.

== Cast ==
- James Ryan as Steve Chase
- Anneline Kriel as Kandy Kane
- Michael Mayer as Marduk
- Stan Schmidt as the Fly
- Norman Robinson as Gypsy Billy
- Ken Gampu as Gorilla
- Bill Flynn as Hot Dog
- Marloe Scott-Wilson as Minerva
- Eddie Dorie as the Optimus
- Malcolm Dorfman as Marduk's soldier
- John Ramsbottom as Dr. Horatio Kane
- Ivor Kissin as Marduk's guard
- Matt Malinowski as Glorious Hair
- Tricia Pettitt as The Goddess

== Production ==
In an article on February 11, 1980, The Hollywood Reporter stated that Film Ventures International would produce a sequel to the film Kill or Be Killed titled Kill or Be Killed, Part II to be scheduled to start filming in June 1980. The film was being referred to Kill or Be Killed II by July 24, 1980 in the Hollywood Reporter and later referred to as Kill and Kill Again in a November 4, 1980 article of the Hollywood Reporter.

The cast of the film was predominantly from South Africa. Variety reported on September 24, 1980 that Diane Newman had been cast in the film, but she does not appear in the film's credits. Filming ended in the United States on July 24, 1980 and was set to move to locations in Europe.

== Release ==
Kill and Kill Again was released in New York on May 8, 1981. On August 12, 1980, the Hollywood Reporter announced that a third film in the series was planned. As of December 2013, no follow-up film has gone into production.

== Proposed Third Film ==
During his commentary on the Blu-Ray edition of Kill and Kill Again, James Ryan gave full details on the proposed third film of the franchise. The film was to be titled Most Dangerous Man and would feature Ryan returning as Steve Chase as now a secret agent. The film was to be in a James Bond-manner with karate sequences. He even said that a female lead was chosen in the form of a young Sharon Stone. However, the collapse of Film Ventures International ended up derailing the plans for the film and Ryan returned full-time to South Africa.

== Reception ==
From contemporary reviews, Variety's "Lor." found that the fight scenes were "unexciting", as the "choreography is too pat and lacks danger." while concluding the film to be a "good-natured karate actioner for genre fans" Vincent Canby of The New York Times stated the film had a "horrible plot" that "contains a lot of action, but most of the violence is in the grunting and groaning that accompanies the various karate chops."
