= Grizzly (film) =

1976 film by William Girdler

- Theatrical release poster by Neal Adams
- Directed by: William Girdler
- Written by: Harvey Flaxman; David Sheldon
- Produced by: Lloyd N. Adams; Harvey Flaxman; David Sheldon
- Starring: Christopher George; Andrew Prine; Richard Jaeckel
- Cinematography: William L. Asman
- Edited by: Bub Asman; Christopher Ness
- Music by: Robert O. Ragland
- Production company: Hollywood West Entertainment
- Distributed by: Film Ventures International (U.S.); Columbia Pictures (international)
- Release date: May 16, 1976
- Running time: 89 minutes
- Country: United States
- Language: English
- Budget: $750,000 (estimated)
- Box office: $39 million (Domestic)

Grizzly (also known as Killer Grizzly on American television) is a 1976 American horror thriller film directed by William Girdler and starring Christopher George, Andrew Prine, Richard Jaeckel, and Joan McCall. It follows a park ranger's attempts to halt the wild rampage of an 18 ft (5.5 m) tall, 2,000 lb (910 kg) man-eating grizzly bear that terrorizes a National Forest, having developed a taste for human flesh. However, a drunken hunting party complicates matters.

Widely considered a Jaws rip-off, Grizzly used many of the same plot devices as its shark predecessor, which had been a huge box office success during the previous year. The giant grizzly bear in the film was portrayed by a Kodiak bear named Teddy, who was 11 ft (3.4 m) tall.

The film was produced and distributed by Film Ventures International, released on May 16, 1976. Despite negative reviews, the film was a considerable commercial success. A sequel, Grizzly II: Revenge, was filmed in 1983 but due to production issues was not completed and released until 2020.

== Plot ==
Military veteran helicopter pilot and guide Don Stober flies individuals above a national park. He states that the woods are untouched and remain much as they did during the time when Native Americans lived there.

After breaking camp, hikers Maggie and June are attacked and killed by an unseen animal. The national park's Chief Ranger, Michael Kelly, and photographer Allison Corwin follow a ranger to the primitive campsite to check on the hikers. There, they discover the mangled corpses, one of which has been partially buried.

At the hospital, a doctor tells Kelly that a large bear killed the women. The park supervisor, Charley Kittridge, blames Kelly for the attacks, as the bears were supposed to have been moved from the park by Kelly and naturalist Arthur Scott before the tourist season began. Kelly and Kittridge decide to move all hikers off the park's mountain, while allowing campers to remain in the lowlands.

During a search of the mountain, a ranger stops for a break at a waterfall and is killed while showering. Kelly recruits the helicopter pilot, Stober, to assist in the search. Flying above the forest, they see Scott adorned in animal skin while tracking the bear. He informs them that the animal they are looking for is a descendent of a prehistoric species of grizzly bear (fictional Pleistocene Epoch Arctodus ursus horribilis) that stands around 15 ft (4.6 m) tall, weighs 2,000 to 3,000 lb (910 to 1,360 kg) – much larger and heavier than a regular one – and is hypercarnivorous. Kelly and Stober scoff at the notion.

At the busy lowland campground, the grizzly kills another woman. Kelly again insists on closing the park, but Kittridge still refuses. The attacks are becoming a national news story and, to counteract this, Kittridge allows amateur hunters into the forest. Later, a lone hunter is chased by the grizzly but escapes by jumping into a river and floating to safety. Later that night, three hunters find a black bear cub. Believing it is the cub of the killer grizzly, they use it as bait for the mother. However, the grizzly finds and eats the cub without the hunters noticing. Kelly assigns fellow ranger Tom at a fire lookout tower on the mountain. However, the grizzly tears down the tower and kills Tom.

On the outskirts of the national park, a woman and her young child are attacked by the grizzly. The mother is killed while the child survives, albeit severely mutilated. Stunned by this development, Kittridge allows Kelly to close the park and ban all hunters.

Stober and Kelly go after the grizzly alone, setting up a trap by hanging a deer carcass from a tree. However, the grizzly takes the bait without getting caught. The next day, Scott, tracking on horseback, finds the remains of the deer carcass and plans to drag it behind his horse and create a trap by leading the grizzly towards Stober and Kelly. However, the grizzly ambushes Scott, knocking him unconscious. He awakens to find himself half-buried. Just as he finishes digging himself out, the grizzly returns and kills him.

Kelly and Stober discover Scott's mutilated body and return to the helicopter to track the grizzly from the air, where they spot it in a clearing. Immediately upon landing, the bear attacks the helicopter, causing Stober to be thrown clear. The bear kills him before turning on Kelly, who fires a rocket launcher at it, killing it in a large explosion. For several seconds, Kelly sadly stares at the burning remains of the grizzly before walking towards Stober's mutilated body.

== Cast ==
- Christopher George as Michael Kelly
- Andrew Prine as Don Stober
- Richard Jaeckel as Arthur Scott
- Joan McCall as Allison Corwin
- Joe Dorsey as Charley Kittridge
- Charles Kissinger as Dr. Hallitt
- Kermit Echols as Corwin
- Tom Arcuragi as Tom
- Victoria Lynn Johnson as Gail
- Kathy Rickman as June
- Mary Ann Hearn as Maggie
- Mike Clifford as Pat
- Sandra Dorsey as Sally

== Production ==
The idea for Grizzly began when the film's producer and writer, Harvey Flaxman, encountered a bear during a family camping trip. Co-producer and co-writer David Sheldon thought the idea would make a good film following the success of Jaws. Girdler discovered the script on Sheldon's desk and offered to find financing as long as he could direct the film. Within a week, Girdler was able to obtain $750,000 in financing from Edward L. Montoro's Film Ventures International movie distribution company.

Grizzly was filmed on location in Clayton, Georgia, with many local residents cast in supporting roles. Catherine Rickman, who played one of the first victims, was actually the daughter of Clayton's mountain man, Frank Rickman. Though unintentional, the casting of George, Prine, and Jaeckel marked the second time this trio of actors starred together in the same film. They had previously played supporting roles in the western Chisum (1970) starring John Wayne.

A Kodiak bear nicknamed Teddy performed as the killer grizzly bear. Teddy was 11 ft (3.4 m) and was the largest bear in captivity at that time. The bear was rented from the Olympic Game Ranch in Sequim, Washington, where he was kept behind an electric fence. The crew was protected from the bear by a piece of green string running through the shooting locations and a ticking kitchen timer. This resembled (to the bear) an electric fence. Actors and crew members were instructed to always stay on the camera side of the string. The bear did not actually roar, so it was tricked into making the motions of roaring by throwing several marshmallows into its mouth and then holding a final marshmallow in front of its face, but not throwing it. The bear would stretch for it. The roaring sound was then added in post.

The original artwork for the Grizzly film poster was created by popular comic book artist Neal Adams.

== Reception ==
Critical reception for Grizzly was extremely negative, with most critics lambasting it for its similarity to Steven Spielberg's thriller Jaws. Vincent Canby of the New York Times panned the film's poor plotting, cinematography and editing, and called it "such a blatant imitation of Jaws that one has to admire the depth of the flattery it represents, though not the lack of talent involved." Donald Guarisco of AllMovie gave the film a negative review, criticizing the film's cliched script and cheap gore, saying, "This energetic but clumsy horror effort is too contrived and poorly realized to be worthwhile for most viewers." Film critic Leonard Maltin awarded the film two out of four stars, calling it an "OK rip-off of Jaws".

Despite the negative reviews, Grizzly was the top grossing independent film of 1976, earning nearly $38 million worldwide, and held the record until Halloween was released two years later in 1978. The film's executive producer, Edward L. Montoro, president of Film Ventures International, distributed the film in the U.S. and Canada and sold the worldwide distribution rights to Columbia Pictures for $1.5 million. Montoro later tried to keep the profits to himself instead of paying the film's director William Girdler and writer-producers David Sheldon and Harvey Flaxman. The three sued Montoro, who was eventually ordered to pay them shares of the profits from the distribution deal.

The music score by Robert O. Ragland has since been largely well received. Ragland commissioned the National Philharmonic Orchestra for the film's theme. The original soundtrack was finally released on CD and MP3 format in September 2018.

On the film review website Rotten Tomatoes the film holds a 45% rating based on 11 reviews, with an average rating of 5.0 out of 10.

== Similarities with Jaws ==
Aside from one being made one year after the success of Jaws, the film Grizzly has several other similarities.

- In both films, a popular American vacation location is terrorised by a particularly large example of a natural predator.
- The first victim is a young female who has her arm severed by the creature as she repeatedly shouts “Oh god!”
- The music plays low, ominous notes as the creature attacks and jaunty, lovely music during the hunting scenes.
- A figure of authority ignores the advice of the police/park rangers and decides to keep the area open to tourists in spite of several deaths.
- A young boy is attacked by the creature to the dismay of his mother.
- Three men (one a naturalist who wears a denim jacket and a woollen hat) attempt to track the beast at the film’s climax. The naturalist reveals he has specialist equipment with which he hopes to stop the creature rather than relying on more traditional methods.
- One of the men, a veteran of the war, tells a story around a table/campfire at night which describes a massacre where dozens of the creatures that they’re hunting killed lots of people, emphasising why they are hunting it. He dies horribly with blood around his mouth in a one-on-one fight with the creature.
- The creature is dispatched with an explosive in both films, caused by the police chief/park ranger who survives.

== Home media ==
Grizzly was released on VHS by Media Home Entertainment. It was released in the LaserDisc format in 1984 by RCA/Columbia Pictures Home Video, but only in Japan.

The DVD of Grizzly was first released on December 2, 1998, by Shriek Show, and it was re-released on DVD by Scorpion Releasing on August 5, 2014. Scorpion Releasing issued a limited-edition Blu-ray in September 2015 exclusively through Screen Archives Entertainment.

On April 21, 2017, RiffTrax released a video on demand of the film with comedy commentary by Michael J. Nelson, Kevin Murphy and Bill Corbett.

In 2021, it was re-released Region Free on DVD and Blu-ray by Severin Films.

== Novelization ==
A movie tie-in novelization by Will Collins (a pseudonym of Edwin Corley) was published in 1976 by Pyramid Books and accompanied the film's release.

== Sequel ==
A sequel was filmed in Hungary in 1983. It was directed by André Szöts from a screenplay by David Sheldon and his wife Joan McCall, with Suzanne C. Nagy as executive producer. The film, about a giant female grizzly bear who seeks revenge after her cub is killed by poachers, stars Steve Inwood, Louise Fletcher, John Rhys-Davies, Deborah Raffin and Deborah Foreman. Notably, the cast also features early appearances by George Clooney, Laura Dern, Charlie Sheen, Timothy Spall, and Ian McNeice.

The film remained officially unreleased until 2020, subsequently being shown at various film festivals. Prior to its official release, a bootleg version of the footage shot for the film, not always coherent at times, circulated on VHS and DVD over the years. It was released on DVD and Blu-ray through video on demand and home video in January 2021.
