= The Dark (1979 film) =

1979 American film

- Directed by: John Cardos
- Written by: Stanford Whitmore
- Produced by: Dick Clark
- Starring: William Devane; Cathy Lee Crosby; Richard Jaeckel; Keenan Wynn; Casey Kasem
- Cinematography: John Morrill
- Edited by: Martin Dreffke
- Music by: Roger Kellaway
- Distributed by: Film Ventures International
- Release date: June 1979
- Running time: 92 minutes
- Country: United States
- Language: English
- Box office: $6 million

The Dark is a 1979 science fiction horror film directed by John Cardos and starring William Devane, Cathy Lee Crosby, Richard Jaeckel, Keenan Wynn, and Casey Kasem.

== Plot ==
A young woman is murdered and mutilated late one night. An ambitious female journalist decides to find out what happened.

== Cast ==
- William Devane as Roy Warner/Steve Dupree
- Cathy Lee Crosby as Zoe Owens
- Richard Jaeckel as Detective Dave Mooney
- Keenan Wynn as Sherman Moss
- Casey Kasem as Pathologist
- Jacquelyn Hyde as De Renzey
- Biff Elliot as Detective Jack Bresler
- John Bloom as The Dark
- Jay Lawrence as Jim Hampton
- Vivian Blaine as Courtney Floyd
- Russ Marin as Dr. Baranowski
- Roberto Contreras as Max
- Vernon Washington as Henry Lydell
- Philip Michael Thomas as Corn Rows
- Ken Minyard as Sportscaster
- Kathy Richards as Shelly

== Production ==
Tobe Hooper was hired by Film Ventures International to direct the film. However, since Hooper fell behind schedule, the producers fired him and replaced him with Cardos. Cardos disclosed that initially, the monster was intended to be a "large, retarded giant of a human being", who was kept locked in an attic by its parents until it broke free, but halfway through production the producers decided they wanted the monster to be more "electronic" in nature and shoot laser beams from his eyes. While Cardos felt the film was overall decent, he disagreed with the producer's decision to change the monster so late in production.

== Reception ==
Roger Ebert awarded the film one and a half stars. Jim Knipfel of Den of Geek awarded the film two stars out of five.

Jacquelyn Hyde's turn as De Renzey earned her a nomination for a Saturn Award for Best Supporting Actress, but lost to Veronica Cartwright in Alien.

== Home media ==
Released on VHS by Media Home Entertainment in 1982 and 1985 | Cat.# M173 |
