= Go for Gold (film) =

- Directed by: Stuart F. Fleming
- Written by: Stuart F. Fleming; Johann Swanepoel
- Produced by: Stuart F. Fleming; Anant Singh
- Starring: James Ryan; Cameron Mitchell; M'zwandile Ngxangane; Sandy Horne; Tamara Franke; Brian O'Shaughnessy; Patricia Sanders
- Cinematography: Vincent G. Cox
- Edited by: Brian Frost; Desiree Grondas
- Music by: David McHugh
- Distributed by: Vestron Video International
- Release date: 1984
- Running time: 93 minutes
- Country: South Africa
- Language: English

Go for Gold, sometimes referred to as Go for the Gold, is a film about a runner and the dilemma he faces. He has a choice between the benefits of his sport and what means a lot to him. It stars James Ryan, Cameron Mitchell, M'zwandile Ngxangane, Sandy Horne, Tamara Franke, Brian O'Shaughnessy and Patricia Sanders. It was directed by Stuart F. Fleming.

== Story ==
Johnny (Played by James Ryan) lives at home with his mother and stepfather who is a physically abusive man. Two things that mean a lot to him are his girlfriend Trish and his running. He has a solid influence in his friend Victor (played by M'zwandile Ngxangane) who is a champion runner. He comes to the attention of Phillip Pritchard (Played by Cameron Mitchell) who is a business man. The runner risks losing the things that are dear to him, as Pritchard who is his ticket to success is forcing him to choose between them and fame and fortune.

== Background ==
It was released on Vestron Video International. It was released in both Beta and VHS formats. It was released in Germany under the title of Skrupellose Verlierer which runs at 89 minutes. In Belgium and the Netherlands, the video release ran at 95 minutes. The British Board of Film Classification rated it as suitable for ages 15 and above.

Hope Holiday who was co-producer for the film had previously been connected Cameron Mitchell in The Hughes Mystery, Killpoint and Low Blow.

=== Reviews and commentry ===
The 1998 edition of Blockbuster Entertainment Guide gave it a 3 star rating and said that it was well acted and often moving. Rotten Tomatoes commented on Cameron Mitchell's supporting role being effective and for a change non-villainous.

== Cast ==
- James Ryan ... Johnny Morris
- Cameron Mitchell ... Phillip Pritchard
- M'zwandile Ngxangane ... Victor Sabaka
- Sandra Horne ... Trish Palmer
- Tamara Franke ... Sandra Pritchard
- Brian O'Shaughnessy ... Stan Hopkins
- Patricia Sanders ... Johnny's mom
- George Korelin ... Sam
- Fred Wheeler ... Fritz
- Morrison Gampu ... Victor's father
- Dennis Smith ... TV interviewer
- Zipporah Benn ... Phillip's secretary
- Larry Taylor ... Desk clerk
- Heine Toerien ... Club member
