= Igo Kantor =

American film producer (c.1930–2019)

- Born: c. 1930; Vienna, Austria
- Died: October 15, 2019 (aged 89)
- Education: University of California, Los Angeles
- Occupation: Film producer
- Spouse: Enid Kantor
- Children: 2 sons, 1 daughter

Igo Kantor (c. 1930 – October 15, 2019) was an American film producer and post-production executive. Kantor was one of the editors of Edward D. Wood, Jr's film noir Jail Bait, released in 1954. Through his company, Synchrofilm, he did post-production work for Easy Rider, Five Easy Pieces and The King of Marvin Gardens, and he produced Kingdom of the Spiders and Mutant.

== Biography ==
Kantor was born in Vienna and raised in Lisbon, met “Dillinger” director Max Nosseck on the ship to New York. Nosseck gave him an intro to his projectionist brother while Kantor was studying at UCLA. In the early 1960s, Kantor opened post-production house Synchrofilm, becoming the post-production supervisor on “The Monkees,” which led to Bert Schneider and Bob Rafelson hiring him to head post-production on “Easy Rider,” “Five Easy Pieces” and “The King of Marvin Gardens.” Kantor closed his post production facility in 1971, then moved on to Warner Bros., where he supervised post-production music on “The Exorcist.” He received Emmy nominations three years in a row for his work on the Bob Hope Christmas specials.
