= Carol Speed =

American actress (1945–2022)

- Born: Carolyn Ann Stewart; March 14, 1945; Bakersfield, California, U.S.
- Died: January 14, 2022 (aged 76); Muskogee, Oklahoma, U.S.
- Occupations: Actress; singer; author
- Years active: 1969–1982; 2006
- Known for: Abby Williams – Abby; Lulu – The Mack

Carolyn Ann Stewart (March 14, 1945 – January 14, 2022), known professionally as Carol Speed, was an American actress, singer-songwriter and author. Speed was known for her roles in films during the 1970s blaxploitation era, for example starring as Abby Williams in the American International Pictures 1974 blaxploitation horror film Abby (1974).

== Biography ==
=== Early life and education ===
Carolyn Ann Stewart was born on March 14, 1945, in Bakersfield, California, to Cora Valrie Stewart (née Taylor) and Freddie Lee Stewart. She was raised in San Jose, California. Speed began performing at a young age. At age 12, she received her first acting role in the San Jose Light Opera production of The King and I. During her youth, she was a part of a singing group which included two of her cousins. Speed attended William C. Overfelt High School, where she was voted "Best All Around" for her senior class. She graduated in 1963. Speed holds the distinction of being the first African-American homecoming queen in Santa Clara County and was one of the first African-Americans to receive a scholarship for the American Conservatory Theater in San Francisco, California.

=== Career ===
Speed began her career in show business as a singer, serving as a back-up singer for Bobbie Gentry during her stint at Harrah's Club in Reno, Nevada. Speed's career in television began in 1970 when she landed a minor role as Clara Dormin on an episode of the NBC series Julia starring Diahann Carroll. Speed appeared in several television commercials during the 1970s.

From 1970 through 1972, Speed appeared in other shows such as, Sanford and Son, The Psychiatrist and Days of Our Lives. In 1972, Speed made her film debut in The New Centurions in which she portrayed Martha, a prostitute. Speed portrayed Mickie, prisoner in Jack Hill's 1972 blaxploitation film The Big Bird Cage alongside Pam Grier and Sid Haig. In 1973, Speed starred opposite Max Julien as Lulu, his childhood friend and top prostitute in the blaxploitation crime film The Mack. In 1974, Speed portrayed Abby Williams, a minister's wife who becomes possessed by the malevolent spirit of an evil demon in William Girdler's horror film Abby. For the film, Speed wrote and sang "My Soul Is A Witness".

In 1976, Speed appeared on the July cover of Jet.

Speed later appeared as Noel in Disco Godfather, starting alongside Rudy Ray Moore in 1979. In 1980, Speed published Inside Black Hollywood. Speed initially accepted a minor role in Quentin Tarantino's 1997 film Jackie Brown but decided not to appear in the film for personal reasons. In 2006, Speed portrayed Cookie in the independent horror film Village Vengeance.

=== Personal life and death ===
Speed was a resident of Atlanta, Georgia during a period in her later years. During the film of The Mack, Speed was romantically involved with Frank Ward, an Oakland, California pimp and drug dealer whose life served as the film's inspiration. Speed had one child, a son, who predeceased her, and one grandson.

She died in Muskogee, Oklahoma, on January 14, 2022, at the age of 76, just two weeks after her The Mack co-star Max Julien had died. Speed was cremated.

== Filmography ==
Year	Title	Role	Reference
1972	The Big Bird Cage	Mickie	
1972	The New Centurions	Martha	
1973	Savage!	Amanda	
1973	The Mack	Lulu	
1973	Bummer	Janyce	
1974	Dynamite Brothers	Sarah	
1974	Black Samson	Leslie	
1974	Abby	Abby Williams	
1979	Disco Godfather	Noel	

== Television ==
Year	Title	Role	Notes
1970	Julia	Clara Dormin	Episode: "Charlie's Chance"
1970	The Psychiatrist		(uncredited) Episode: "God Bless the Children (Pilot)"
1971	Love Hate Love	Secretary	ABC Movie of the Week
1972	Getting Away from It All	Town Clerk	ABC Movie of the Week
1972	Sanford and Son	Crystal Simpson	Episode: "Here Comes the Bride, There Goes the Bride"
1972	The Paul Lynde Show	Laverne	Episode: "Paul's Desperate Hour"
1973	Tenafly		(uncredited) Episode: Pilot
1973	The Girls of Huntington House	Marlene	ABC Movie of the Week

== Books ==
Year	Title	References
1980	Inside Black Hollywood	
2002	The Georgette Harvey Story	
2004	Gods in Polyester, or a Survivors' Account of 70s Cinema Obscura (contributor)	

== Music ==
Year	Song title	Film	References
1973	"I Can Make It"	Girls of Huntington House	
1974	"My Soul is a Witness"	Abby	
