= Steve Inwood =

American actor (1947–2025)

- Steve Inwood in Wonder Woman 1978
- Born: January 3, 1947
- Died: May 15, 2025 (aged 78)

Steve Tongalson Inwood (January 3, 1947 – May 15, 2025) was an American actor.

== Life and career ==
Inwood appeared mainly in the early 1980s with roles in such films as Fame, Prince of the City and Staying Alive. After that, he focused on appearances in television productions.

In the late 1990s, Inwood retired from films and television.

Inwood died on May 15, 2025, at the age of 78. He is buried at Westwood Village Memorial Park Cemetery.

== Filmography ==
- 1973: Hurry Up, or I'll Be 30 as Tony
- 1974: The Rehearsal
- 1977: Contract on Cherry Street (TV movie) as Fran Marks
- 1978: Wonder Woman (TV series, one episode) as Mac
- 1980: Cruising as Martino
- 1980: Fame as François Lafete
- 1980: Countdown in Manhattan as Deitz
- 1981: Prince of the City as Assistant U.S. Attorney Mario Vincente
- 1981: Jacqueline Susann's Valley of the Dolls (TV movie) as Teddi Casablanca
- 1982: A Question of Honor (TV movie) as Luke Romano
- 1982: The Paw of the Tigress (TV movie, Farrell for the People) as Alan Hellinger
- 1983: The Fighter (TV movie) as Toby
- 1983: Staying Alive - Jesse
- 1983: Grizzly II: Revenge as Nick Hollister
- 1985: Crime of Innocence (TV movie) as Dennis Spector
- 1986: Matlock (TV series, one episode) as Steve Emerson
- 1986: Dark Mansions (TV movie) as Jerry Mills
- 1986: Night Heat (TV series, one episode) as Ron DiCosta
- 1987: The Hitchhiker (TV series, one episode) as Simon Hopper
- 1987–1995: Murder, She Wrote (TV series, three episodes) - Rudy Grimes / Sergeant Petrakas / Cash Logan
- 1988: Spenser: For Hire (TV series, one episode) as Tom McAllister
- 1988: Something Is Out There (TV series, one episode)
- 1989: General Hospital (TV series, one episode) as Moreno #2
- 1990: Booker (TV series, one episode) as Nick Booker
- 1991: The Human Shield as Ali Dallal
- 1991–1992: The Trials of Rosie O'Neill (TV series, two episodes)
- 1994: Almost Dead as Police Chief
- 1995: One West Waikiki (TV series, one episode) as Allie Wade
- 1995: Murder One (TV series, one episode) as Walter London
- 1997: Dellaventura (TV series, one episode) as Lieutenant Kovac (final appearance)
