= The Town Talk =

The Town Talk (Alexandria)

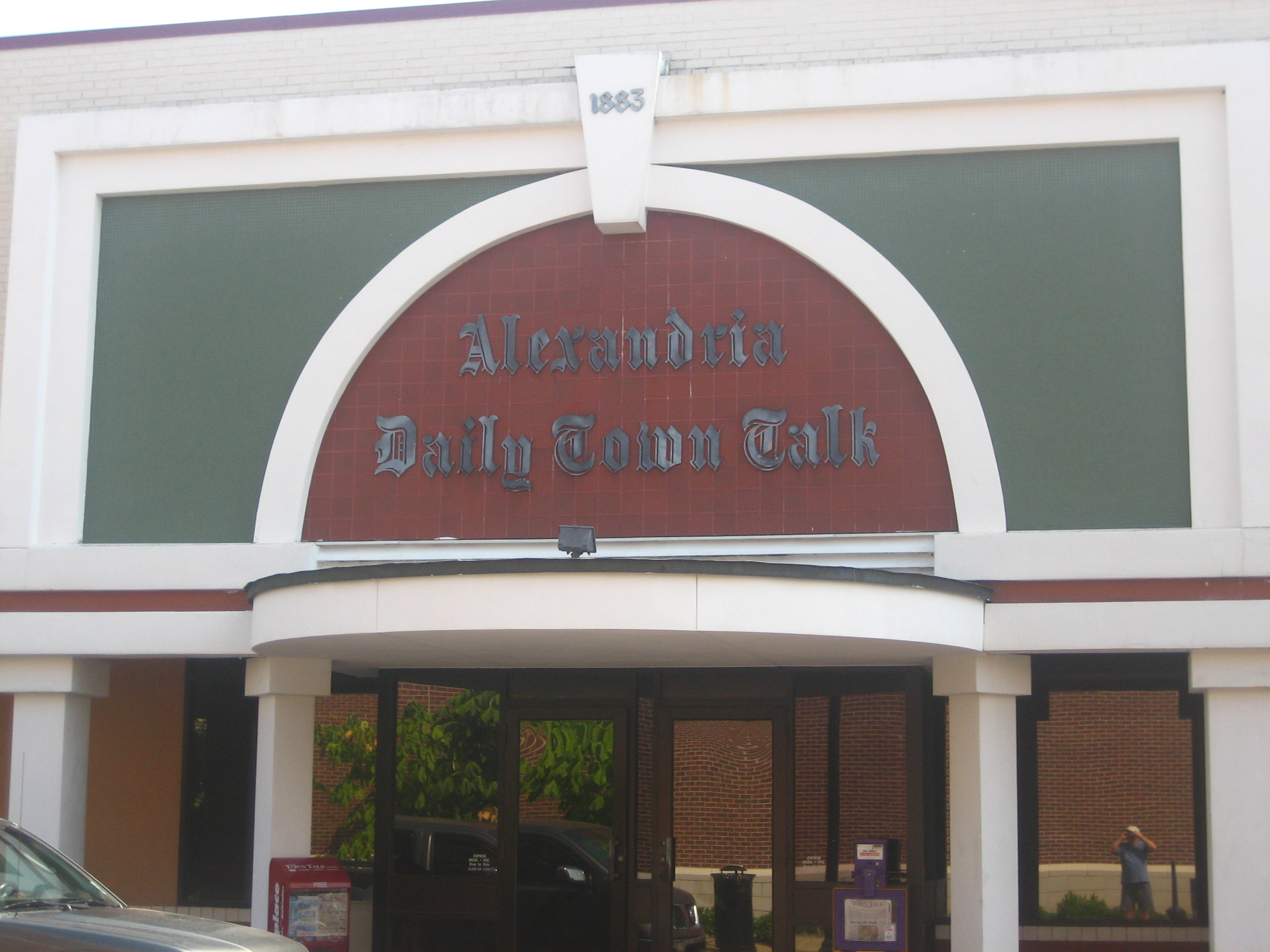
- Third Street entrance to The Town Talk in Alexandria, Louisiana
- Type: Daily newspaper
- Format: Broadsheet
- Owner: Gannett
- Editor: Paul V. Carty (effective July 7, 2003)
- Founded: March 17, 1883
- Headquarters: 1201 Third Street, Alexandria, Rapides Parish, Louisiana, USA
- Circulation: 19,500 daily; 27,500 Sundays
- Website: thetowntalk.com

The Town Talk, started as The Daily Town Talk in 1883 and later named the Alexandria Daily Town Talk, is the major newspaper of Central Louisiana. It is published by Gannett in Alexandria.
