= The Manitou =

1978 American horror film

- Theatrical release poster
- Directed by: William Girdler
- Screenplay by: William Girdler; Jon Cedar; Thomas Pope
- Based on: The Manitou by Graham Masterton
- Produced by: William Girdler
- Starring: Tony Curtis; Michael Ansara; Susan Strasberg; Stella Stevens; Jon Cedar; Ann Sothern; Burgess Meredith
- Cinematography: Michel Hugo
- Edited by: Bub Asman
- Music by: Lalo Schifrin
- Production companies: Herman Weist & Associates; Melvin Simon Productions
- Distributed by: AVCO Embassy Pictures
- Release date: April 28, 1978
- Running time: 104 minutes
- Country: United States
- Language: English
- Box office: $1.5 million

The Manitou is a 1978 American supernatural horror film produced and directed by William Girdler, and starring Tony Curtis, Michael Ansara, and Susan Strasberg. It follows a woman in San Francisco who begins developing a fast-growing tumor on the back of her neck which is discovered to be supernatural in origin. It is based on the 1976 novel of the same name by Graham Masterton, which was inspired by the concept of manitou in Native American theology, believed to be a spiritual and fundamental life force by members of the Algonquian peoples. The film was Girdler's final feature, as he died in a helicopter accident prior to its release.

== Plot ==
Karen Tandy has a growing tumor on her neck and seeks treatment at a hospital in San Francisco. After a series of x-rays, Dr. Jack Hughes finds evidence that the tumor is a growing fetus. Karen agrees to undergo surgery to remove the tumor. She seeks the comfort of an old friend and ex-employer named Harry Erskine, a fortune teller who preys on the gullible to make a living. While spending the night at Harry's place, Karen utters a phrase that sounds like "pana witchy salatoo" in her sleep. When Harry mentions the phrase the next day, Karen claims she never heard it before.

Karen's operation goes awry when the surgeon's hands shake, causing him to slice his own hand with a scalpel. Meanwhile, one of Harry's clients suffers a seizure and utters the same phrase spoken by Karen; she levitates out of the room and falls down the staircase. Convinced that Karen is being afflicted by black magic, Harry consults a former psychic named Amelia Caruso and her partner, MacArthur. They and Amelia's aunt, Mrs. Karmann, visit Karen's home, where they hold a seance to draw out the spirit attacking Karen. A violent thunderstorm hinders their efforts. Mrs. Karmann declares that the figure she saw resembled a wooden statue of an Indian.

Harry, Amelia and MacArthur visit aging anthropologist Dr. Snow, who recounts tales of 400-year-old Indian medicine men wielding great powers. Upon hearing the strange phrase, Dr. Snow deduces it partially as meaning "my death foretells my return." Unable to help them directly, he advises them that they should seek the council of one of the vestigial Indian medicine men now surviving in certain remote areas. Harry visits John Singing Rock, a medicine man who tells him about manitou, spirits who exist in everything surrounding them. He refuses Harry's plea for help but later changes his mind, requesting $100,000 and tobacco in exchange for his services.

Harry and John reach the hospital and draw a circle of sand around Karen's bed in order to confine the spirit using her body. Through Karen, the spirit reveals himself to be the 400-year-old Native American shaman, Misquamacus, who is reincarnating himself through the young woman to exact his revenge on the white men who invaded North America and exterminated its native peoples. He further warns John against helping white men such as Harry and Karen. John prepares to stop Misquamacus' growing power and calls upon the strength of other manitou, to no avail.

Misquamacus kills a male nurse and claws his way out from Karen's neck, appearing as a dwarf-sized man. He also reanimates the dead nurse to harm others, but John manages to thwart him. In another encounter, Misquamacus summons an ancient Indian demon by the name of the Lizard of the Trees which manages to erase the sand circle and wound Dr. Hughes. After Harry has taken Hughes to the lower levels of the hospital to treat his wounds, he returns to find the entire floor covered in ice and the receptionist frozen solid.

Harry finds John sitting alone in the room. John explains that Misquamacus inflicted wounds on his face with surgical instruments. As they are about to leave, they are faced with Misquamacus caught amidst a snowstorm caused by summoning of another demon called the Star Beast. In the altercation, Harry throws a typewriter towards Misquamacus, which temporarily weakens him, allowing Harry and John to escape. Harry comes up with the idea of using the manitou of electrical equipment surrounding them. John reluctantly agrees and proposes he will act as a medium for these manitou to manifest themselves. As they are discussing the plan, the entire room shakes with a violent earthquake, which John identifies as heralding the arrival, through a portal opened by Misquamacus, of the Great Old One, the supreme Native American demon.

Harry instructs Dr. Hughes to switch on all the machines in the hospital while he and John travel towards Misquamacus. They find that Karen’s hospital room is now filled with an illusory manifestation of the starry void of outer space. John tries to channel the machine manitou but is unsuccessful. He accepts defeat, but Harry refuses to give in. He tries to distract the spirit while calling on Karen. Karen regains consciousness and channels the machine manitou to finally defeat Misquamacus and banish the Great Old One back whence it came behind the portal. The ordeal ended, Harry and Karen are reunited. Harry accompanies John to a cab for the airport, thanking him for his help. John thanks him back and warns that they might meet Misquamacus once again for, though the body of the medicine man’s latest incarnation has been destroyed, his manitou (soul) lives on.

== Cast ==
- Tony Curtis as Harry Erskine
- Michael Ansara as John Singing Rock
- Susan Strasberg as Karen Tandy
- Stella Stevens as Amelia Caruso
- Jon Cedar as Dr. Jack Hughes
- Ann Sothern as Mrs. Karmann
- Burgess Meredith as Dr. Snow
- Paul Mantee as Dr. McEvoy
- Jeanette Nolan as Mrs. Winconis
- Lurene Tuttle as Mrs. Herz
- Hugh Corcoran as MacArthur

== Release ==
The film was released theatrically by AVCO Embassy Pictures on April 28, 1978, in New York, and May 17, 1978, in Los Angeles.

=== Home media ===
The film was released on DVD by Momentum Pictures on October 24, 2005.

It was re-released on DVD by Anchor Bay Entertainment in 2007. On April 16, 2019, Scream Factory released the film for the first time on Blu-ray. According to the Scream Factory Blu-ray release, the original negative is lost, and the film had to be restored from alternate elements.

== Reception ==
On review aggregator website Rotten Tomatoes, The Manitou has a 40% approval rating based on 10 reviews, with an average rating of 5.1/10. The staff of Variety wrote, "This bout between good and Satan includes some scares, camp and better than average credits". Time Out's Derek Adams praised the film's special effects and called the film "a successful excursion, spoiled only by the director's habit of plopping in postcard views of the Golden Gate Bridge instead of exteriors". Donald Guarisco of AllMovie criticized the film's script and direction but complimented the acting, special effects and ending. Author John Kenneth Muir wrote the film has "an infectious feeling of fun" despite being "patently absurd".

Masterton, who wrote the source novel, said he "liked it a lot".

== Sources ==
- Donahue, Suzanne Mary (1987). American Film Distribution: The Changing Marketplace. Ann Arbor, Michigan: UMI Research Press. ISBN 978-0-835-71776-2.
