= Three on a Meathook =

- Theatrical release poster
- Directed by: William Girdler
- Written by: William Girdler
- Produced by: John Asman; Lee S. Jones Jr.
- Starring: Charles Kissinger; James Pickett; Sherry Steiner
- Cinematography: William Asman
- Edited by: Henry Asman
- Music by: William Girdler
- Production company: Studio 1 Productions
- Release date: 1972
- Running time: 85 minutes
- Country: United States
- Language: English

Three on a Meathook is a 1972 horror film written and directed by William Girdler and starring Charles Kissinger, James Pickett and Sherry Steiner. The film is loosely based on the crimes committed by Ed Gein.

== Plot ==
Four girls embark on a weekend trip to a lake. On their way home, they encounter car trouble and meet Billy Townsend, a local young man who offers them a ride to his farm, where he lives with his father, Frank. Later, Frank murders three of the girls and attempts to frame his son by convincing Billy that he is responsible for the deaths and has gone insane.

== Production ==
Three on a Meathook, director William Girdler's second film, was inspired by the true story of Ed Gein. The film crew included the Asman brothers, with John Asman on sound, William Asman behind the camera and film editor Henry Asman. The film received funding from a local realtor named Joe Schulten, as well as cash from Girdler's trust fund.

== Release ==
Three on a Meathook was shown at the South Park drive-in on October 7, 1972.

== See also ==
- List of American films of 1972
