= William Girdler =

American film director (1947–1978)

- Born: William Brent Girdler; October 22, 1947; Louisville, Kentucky, U.S.
- Died: January 21, 1978 (age 30); Manila, Philippines
- Occupations: Film director; screenwriter; composer; film producer
- Years active: 1965–1978

William Girdler (October 22, 1947 – January 21, 1978), also known as Billy Girdler, was an American filmmaker. In a span of six years, from 1972 to 1978, he directed nine feature films in such genres as horror and action. Girdler also wrote and produced three of his features, Abby, Sheba, Baby and The Manitou.

== Life and career ==
Girdler was born in Louisville, Kentucky. He made his first films with a home movie camera at the age of 8 and by the age of 23, produced his first film, Asylum of Satan. He was the founder of the Mid-America Pictures corporation.

Among the films he directed were Asylum of Satan (1971), Three on a Meathook (1972), The Zebra Killer (1974), Abby (1974), Sheba, Baby (1974), Project: Kill (1975), Grizzly (1976), Day of the Animals (1977), and The Manitou (1978), was his last film he made and released a few weeks after his death.

=== Death ===
William Girdler died in a helicopter crash in the Philippines about 30 mi (48 km) from Manila on January 21, 1978. Along with producer Patrick Allan Kelly, Girdler was scouting filming locations for a film about drug smuggling. The body was flown from Manila to Los Angeles for a memorial service. His remains were later flown to Louisville, where he was buried in Cave Hill Cemetery.

=== Personal life ===
Girdler was married twice. He was first married to Barbara Peter (1945–2013). They had two children: a son, William Brent Girdler Jr, and a daughter, Barbara Laurice Girdler. Girdler was later married to photographer Avis Ann Smith, until the time of his death in 1978.
