= Black Eagle (1988 film) =

1988 film directed by Eric Karson

- Theatrical release poster
- Directed by: Eric Karson
- Written by: Michael Gonzales; A. E. Peters
- Produced by: Shimon Arama
- Starring: Shō Kosugi; Jean-Claude Van Damme; Doran Clark; Kane Kosugi; Shane Kosugi; Vladimir Skomarovsky
- Cinematography: George Koblasa
- Edited by: Michael Kelly
- Music by: Terry Plumeri
- Production companies: Rotecon BV; Magus Productions
- Distributed by: Taurus Entertainment; Imperial Entertainment
- Release date: May 19, 1988
- Running time: 93 minutes 104 minutes (director's cut)
- Country: United States
- Language: English

Black Eagle is a 1988 American action film directed by Eric Karson and starring Shō Kosugi, Jean-Claude Van Damme, and Kane Kosugi. It was shot on Malta. The film was released in the United States on May 19, 1988.

== Plot ==
Through radio traffic, the US and Soviet Union learn that an F-111 carrying a sensitive missile guidance system is lost near Malta. CIA agent Dean Rickert initially dispatches agent Steve Henderson to retrieve it, but his director insists he recall agent Ken Tani (Shō Kosugi), codenamed "Black Eagle", from his vacation seeing his kids to do the job. Rickert also enlists the help of Jesuit priest Joseph Begelia to assist Tani.

Agent Henderson is subsequently caught trying to place a tracking beacon on the Soviet trawler Leontev (which is also searching for the plane), and killed by Andrei, the top soldier for Colonel Vladimir Klimenko, the leader of the Soviet effort to recover the missile. Tani is taken from his previous mission to Malta, where he meets up with his two sons, Denny and Bryan, and another CIA agent, Patricia Parker. Later, posing as oceanographers, Begelia and Tani find the wreck of the plane. The Soviets interrogate them, but are convinced they are indeed researchers. While at the beach with his sons, Tani tells them about the "Black Eagle", a spirit inside them which can help them in times of need.

Having discovered the identities of Begelia, Tani and Parker, the Soviets anonymously invite them to a casino in Malta. Afterward, Tani and Parker discover an assassin in Tani's hotel room, and kill him. They take his children to a safehouse, where Tani vaguely informs them he is a government agent. Klimenko learns that the "Rapid Angel", another system recovered from the plane, will be extracted from Malta aboard the Gorkiy, a cargo ship.

In order to recover the missile, Tani hang glides to the wreck and begins his dive. While he disassembles the missile nosecone, another of Begelia's assistants on the boat is taken captive by sailors from the Leontev. Tani kills them, blows up their dinghy and escapes to a cave system underneath a church where Begelia is celebrating mass. They take the missile nosecone to Rickert, and inform him that Rapid Angel was missing. He insists Tani stay on Malta to recover it, as well. He angrily demands that his children be taken off the island and out of harm's way, to which Rickert agrees.

On the way to the airport, Parker and the boys are trailed by Klimenko's best soldier, Andrei. Their driver Peter, ostensibly a CIA agent, betrays them and leads them into a kidnapping. Bryan escapes after Parker and Denny pretend he is ill; during his escape, he gets into a fight with some local boys and is taken by the police. Parker and Denny are taken by Andrei to "the Fort outside Medina." Tani is questioned by the police, who suspect he is involved in the deaths of several Soviet citizens, and retrieves Bryan, who tells him about the fort.

Tani immediately goes to the fort to rescue Denny and Parker. Parker uses Denny's LA Dodgers hat to signal their location, and Tani helps them escape while killing several Soviets before confronting Andrei. After a fight, Tani dives from the fort's wall and escapes with Parker, Denny, and Begelia by boat. After seeing Parker and his children off to Rome, Begelia and Tani scout out the Gorkiy in the shipyard. Begelia sabotages their navigation circuitry. Tani insists Begelia leave him to finish the job alone that night, and goes to prepare himself with the spirit of the Black Eagle.

Tani gets aboard the Gorkiy and fights through Klimenko's men. Begelia's charges go off, preventing the ship from leaving port, so Klimenko takes the Rapid Angel device and flees to the Leontev. During the chase, Begelia appears and helps Tani by distracting most of the men, leaving him to confront Andrei once again. When Andrei's girlfriend, Natasha, unwittingly distracts him, Begelia shoots him in the leg and Tani is able to swim to the Leontev. While Begelia rigs it with explosives, Tani confronts Klimenko and obtains the device. Andrei, fearing for Natasha's life, urges her to abandon ship, which she does. As the Leontev pulls away, Andrei is sucked into its propeller and killed. Tani and Begelia escape with Natasha and destroy the Leontev.

The police inspector, who realizes Tani is not an oceanographer, simply advises him to leave the island at his earliest convenience. Tani arrives in Rome and surprises his waiting sons and agent Parker.

== Cast ==
- Shō Kosugi as Ken "Black Eagle" Tani, a Japanese-born highly trained CIA spy sent Malta
- Jean-Claude Van Damme as Andrei, a Russian commando serving under Klimenko
- Doran Clark as Patricia Parker, a fellow CIA agent protecting Tani's sons
- Bruce French as Father Joseph Bedelia, a Catholic priest and asset to the CIA
- Vladimir Skomarovsky as Colonel Vladimir Klimenko, a Russian Officer operating in Malta
- William Bassett as Dean Rickert, a CIA officer who is Tani's handler
- Kane Kosugi as Brian Tani, Ken's oldest son
- Shane Kosugi as Denny Tani, Ken's youngest son
- Alfred Mallia as Peter, a CIA agent working as a mole for the Soviets
- Dorota Puzio as Natasha, Andrei's lover
- Jan Triska as Capt. Valery, the captain of the Gorkiy
- Gene Davis as Steve Henderson, a cocky CIA agent whom Ken replaced
- Victor Bartolo as Chief Inspector Borg, a major detective in Malta

== Reception ==
=== Critical response ===
Critics gave the film a mixed reception overall.
