= Kane Kosugi =

American actor (born 1974)

- 小杉健
- Born: Kane Takeshi Kosugi; October 11, 1974 (age 52); Los Angeles, California, U.S.
- Occupations: Actor, martial artist
- Years active: 1983–present
- Parent(s): Shook Gim Kosugi, Sho Kosugi
- Website: https://www.kanekosugi.com

Kane Takeshi Kosugi (小杉健, Kosugi Takeshi; born October 11, 1974) is an American actor and martial artist of Japanese and Chinese descent.

The son of Japanese martial arts film star Sho Kosugi, Kane began his career as a child actor starring opposite his father in films like Revenge of the Ninja and Pray for Death. He first gained recognition in Japan for his starring role as Jiraiya (Ninja Black) in Ninja Sentai Kakuranger, being the second American-born sentai ranger. He has appeared in over 30 films and television series, including the video game adaptations DOA: Dead or Alive and Street Fighter Alpha. He competed on six seasons of the obstacle challenge program Sasuke, where he was the first American competitor.

Like his father, Kosugi has appeared in both Japanese and American media. In Japan, Kane is considered gaijin tarento (foreign talent) due to his Nisei (second generation) foreign born heritage. Kane's mother, Shook Gim Kosugi (née Chan), was born in China.

== Acting career ==
Since 1983, Kosugi has appeared in various roles as a voice actor for video games, stunt actor in movies and character actor in both English language and Japanese language films. His first movie, Revenge of the Ninja, had him playing the son of his real life father, Sho Kosugi. Kane kept his real name in the movie. He has also been in other movies starring his father as well. With the intention of following in his father's footsteps, Kane trained to become a martial arts actor. Kane has an extensive martial arts background in wushu, ninjutsu, taekwondo, karate, judo and kendo.

He made his Japanese acting debut in the 1993 television series Ryūkyū no Kaze (Dragon Spirit), the 31st entry in NHK's long-running taiga drama series. Kane followed this up with his first lead film role in the two-part Toei V-Cinema movies Za Kakuto Oh (The Fighting King) and Za Kakuto Oh 2 (The Fighting King 2) directed by his father. Next came the 1994 television series Ninja Sentai Kakuranger, an installment in Toei's Super Sentai franchise. Kane was the only American-born cast member of Kakuranger and his character (Jiraiya) spoke almost exclusively in English during his first few episodes.

He could be seen regularly on the NHK children's program Karada de Asobo (体で遊ぼ), which was a weekday exercise show that ran until March 2010. He also does commercial spots for vitamin drinks and regularly appears on a physical challenge show called Kinniku Oukoku (筋肉王国), formerly known as Kinniku Banzuke. He had a brief role as a Yakuza member in the action-thriller, War, with Jason Statham and Jet Li.

Kane then began to work in China and Hong Kong. He played Ryu Hayabusa, a master Ninja in the live action adaptation of the video game DOA: Dead or Alive, directed by Corey Yuen. He would play the lead villain in Coweb, the directorial debut of Xiong Xin Xin and the lead role debut of Jiang Lui Xia. In 2011, he appeared alongside real-life best friend Sammy Hung and Sammy's father, Sammo Hung in Choy Lee Fut.

In 2013, Kane played the lead villain Nakamura in the film Ninja: Shadow of a Tear opposite Scott Adkins. The two reunited on the film Zero Tolerance. Kane would also play the character of Kazuya Mishima in the prequel Tekken 2: Kazuya's Revenge in 2014. In 2016, Kane played "God Lee" in the Takashi Miike-directed adaptation of manga and anime Terra Formars. He went to China to play a disfigured assassin in the straight to streaming action-horror film Heaven Inspector, followed by a role as "The Rider" in the recently released film The Driver opposite Mark Dacascos. He is set to reunite with Dacascos on One Night in Bangkok while another film he shot, Maxx, is currently in post-production.

=== Sportsman No. 1 ===
From 1997 to 2004, Kane participated in the Japanese physical competition program Sportsman No.1 Decisive Battle, competing first against other celebrities and then against professional athletes, achieving unparalleled success winning a record 6 tournaments and finishing second in 4 others.

Tournament	Airdate	Result	Points
Celebrity Survival Battle #2	April 2, 1997	Winner	560 points (125 more than 2nd place finisher)
Celebrity Survival Battle #3	April 1, 1998	Winner	950 points (540 more than 2nd place finisher)
Celebrity Survival Battle #4	October 2, 1998	Winner	810 points (305 more than 2nd place finisher)
Pro Sportsman Tournament #5	Januaury 1, 1999	4th place	300 points (80 less than winner)
Celebrity Survival Battle #5	March 26, 1999	2nd place	615 points (5 less than winner)
Pro Sportsman Tournament #6	January 1, 2000	Winner	385 points (10 more than 2nd place finisher)
Celebrity Survival Battle #6	March 24, 2000	Winner	685 points (205 more than 2nd place finisher)
Celebrity Survival Battle #7	October 10–14, 2000	Winner	446 points (96 more than 2nd place finisher)
Pro Sportsman Tournament #7	January 1, 2001	2nd place	455 points (125 less than winner)
Celebrity Survival Battle #8	March 23, 2001	2nd place	613 points (1 less than winner)
Pro Sportsman Tournament #8	January 1, 2002	2nd place	540 points (25 less than winner)
Pro Sportsman Tournament #10	January 1, 2004	4th place	350 points (105 less than winner)

=== Sasuke ===
Kane competed on Kinniku Banzuke/Oukoku's special show Sasuke (known in America as Ninja Warrior) for several years (from 1997 - 2001). Thus far he is one of only four foreigners (with the others being Jordan Jovtchev from Bulgaria in Sasuke 8, Lee En-Chih from Taiwan in Sasuke 24, and René Kaselowsky from Germany in Sasuke 37), and the only American, to make it to the Final Stage in Sasuke, out of 3,700 total competitors to date and twenty-seven different Final Stage competitors. Despite his strong performances, #98 is the highest number he has ever worn.

He stopped participating after the 8th competition. Around the time of Sasuke 11, in an interview with the Kinniku Banzuke successor, Taiku Ookoku, he said, "私は訓練に時間があれば、私は競争したいと思います。", which roughly translates to, "If I have time to train, I would like to compete." Kane is still the only competitor to compete five times without failing the first stage. He was the first competitor to beat the Spider Climb in the final stage, doing so in Sasuke 8.

After a 21 year absence on the show, Kane appeared again in Sasuke 40. He kept his streak of first stage clears alive, and became the oldest competitor to ever clear the First Stage at age 48. However, two tournaments later in Sasuke 42, he failed on the first stage's Dragon Glider, marking the first time he ever failed an obstacle in the first stage.

Here is a table of information of his participation in Sasuke.

Competition	Airdate	Competitor #	Stage	Obstacle
Sasuke 1	September 27, 1997	89	Third	Failed Pole Bridge
Sasuke 4	October 16, 1999	97	Third	Failed Cliff Hanger
Sasuke 6	September 9, 2000	98	Third	Failed Body Prop
Sasuke 7	March 17, 2001	98	Second	Failed Spider Walk
Sasuke 8	September 29, 2001	91	Final	Failed Final Rope
Sasuke 40	December 27, 2022	3991	Second	Failed Backstream
Sasuke 42	December 25, 2024	92	First	Failed Dragon Glider

== Personal life ==
Kane was born in Los Angeles, California, on October 11, 1974, as the eldest of three siblings. His parents are legendary Ninja film actor Sho Kosugi, who is Japanese; and Shook Kosugi, who is Chinese. Kane has a brother, Shane (born 1976), who made occasional appearances on Kinniku Banzuke (known on G4 as Unbeatable Bansuke) and Sasuke as well as appear as Kane's younger brother in some of their father's ninja films in the 80's; and a sister, Ayeesha (born 1983), who was a golfer at University of Las Vegas. He was romantically involved with female golfer Riko Higashio, but broke up in 2005 when they seemed on the verge of marriage. In December 2009, Kane married a woman from Hong Kong. On March 4, 2019, Kane became a dad when his wife gave birth to a baby daughter.

=== Rift with father ===
Kosugi and his father were seemingly no longer on speaking terms due to Kane choosing a career in Japanese television instead of helping to run some of his schools under the banner of his institute, and even taking some of Sho's staff with him. In reference to Kane, Sho was reported as saying on a television show with fortuneteller Kazuko Hosoki in April 2007, "My son is a coward!" (息子は卑怯だ, Musuko wa hikyō da), saying Kane "stabbed me in the back" and at one point made a reference to Judas Iscariot. However, Sho was seen at Kane's wedding in late 2009, indicating that they are reconciling or already have.

== Filmography ==
=== Film ===
Year	Title	Role	Notes
1983	Revenge of the Ninja	Kane Osaki	
1985	9 Deaths of the Ninja	Kane Yamada	
1985	Pray for Death	Takeshi Saito	
1988	Black Eagle	Brian Tani	
1991	Journey of Honor	Yorimune Tokugawa	
1994	The Fighting King	Ken Ōshiro	V-cinema
1994	Ninja Sentai Kakuranger	Jiraiya/Ninja Black	
1994	The Fighting King 2	Ken Ōshiro	V-cinema
1994	Super Sentai World	Ninja Black (voice)	Short film
1995	Zero Woman II	Ken	V-cinema
1996	Chōriki Sentai Ohranger: Ole vs. Kakuranger	Jiraiya/Ninja Black	V-cinema
1997	Cat's Eye	Lee, the Black Flag	
1998	Who Am I?	Takeshi	
2000	Street Fighter Zero: The Animation	Ryu (voice)	Japanese version
2002	Muscle Heat	Joe Jinno	
2004	Godzilla: Final Wars	Kazama	
2006	DOA: Dead or Alive	Ryu Hayabusa	
2007	War	Temple Garden Warrior	
2009	Baton	Satan (voice)	Japanese version
2009	Coweb	Song Li-shan	
2009	Timeless	Kane	Short film
2011	Choy Lee Fut	Shōsa Takeda	
2013	Ninja: Shadow of a Tear	Nakabara	
2014	Tekken 2: Kazuya's Revenge	Kazuya Mishima	
2015	Zero Tolerance	Kane	
2016	Terra Formars	God Lee	
2018	Heaven Inspector	Ya Ba	Web film
2019	The Driver	The Rider	
2020	One Night in Bangkok	Japanese Fixer	
2021	MAXX	Maxx	
2022	Kamen Rider Revice the Movie: Battle Familia	Azuma	
2023	Good Morning, Nemureru Shishi 2	Kurotora	TV Special
2025	Bloat	Ryan	
2025	Bang		
2026	Ninja Wars — Blackfox vs. Shogun's Ninja	Hattori Hanzo	Web film

=== Television ===
Year	Title	Role	Notes
1984	The Master	Bobby	1 episode
1993	Dragon Spirit	Ken	16 episodes
1993	Ultraman: The Ultimate Hero	Kenichi Kai	13 episodes
1994	Ninja Sentai Kakuranger	Jiraiya/Ninja Black	51 episodes
1996	The Kindaichi Case Files	Wataru Iwano	2 episodes
1996	Legend of St. Dragon	Daisaku Sendō	10 episodes
1999	Truth: My Child's Murder Diary	Tsuyoshi Nomura	Television film
1999	Hagure Keiji Junjoha	Hideyuki Noda	Seasons 12–14
2008	Parallel Space	Kurakane	1 episode
2009	Tokumei Kakaricho Tadano Hitoshi	Shunsuke Tōdō	1 episode
2016	Detective Hachikei: Brilliant Reasoning	Keitarō Hachiya	Television film
2018	The Top Fair	Officer Kane	6 episodes
2020	Ultra Galaxy Fight: The Absolute Conspiracy	Ultraman Powered (voice)	English version

=== Video games ===
Year	Title	Role	Notes
2023	Wild Hearts	Nobumitsu Tsumori (voice)	English version
