= Pray for Death =

- Theatrical release poster
- Directed by: Gordon Hessler
- Written by: James Booth
- Starring: Sho Kosugi; James Booth; Donna Kei Benz; Norman Burton; Kane Kosugi; Shane Kosugi; Matthew Faison; Parley Baer; Robert Ito; Michael Constantine
- Cinematography: Roy H. Wagner
- Edited by: Bill Butler; Stephen Butler
- Music by: Thomas Chase
- Production company: Trans World Entertainment
- Distributed by: Trans World Entertainment
- Release date: 9 August 1985
- Running time: 92 minutes
- Country: United States
- Languages: English; Japanese
- Budget: $6.8 million

Pray for Death is a 1985 American martial arts action film directed by Gordon Hessler and starring Sho Kosugi, James Booth, Norman Burton, Michael Constantine, and, the lead's sons Kane and Shane Kosugi.

The plot follows a retired ninja warrior, now married to an American woman, moves to Los Angeles at his wife's request in order to begin a new life for their two sons. Shortly after their arrival, he is mistakenly drawn into a protracted conflict with an L.A. crime boss and his vicious henchmen. He is forced by a series of brutal circumstances to come out of retirement and bring the criminals to justice.

== Plot ==
At the insistence of his American-born wife, Aiko, Yokohama salaryman Akira Saito decides to immigrate from Japan to the United States to raise their two sons Takeshi and Tomoya. Unbeknownst to his family, Akira is in fact a highly skilled ninja, who had faithfully protected the secrets of his temple minded by his adoptive father and sensei, Koga. Years before, Akira's brother, Shoji (also raised and trained by Koga) sought to steal from the temple while in disguise, forcing Akira to engage him in battle and kill him. Akira's meditation on this matter is disrupted by an attack from Koga to encourage him to wipe the guilt from his mind before it kills him. Akira announces his intentions to move to America to start a new life, to put the shadows of the ninja behind him. Koga makes him swear never to reveal their secrets, and gives him a ninja helmet as a gift, while reminding him he can never leave his shadows behind.

In Houston, the Saitos meet with Sam Green, the widowed owner of a closed restaurant and apartment that Akira and Aiko have bought. After the sale is completed, the cigar store area of the building is broken into by police Sgt. Trumble, a corrupt cop, along with his partner Sgt. Joe Daly. Both work for local mobster Mr. Newman. Daly removes loose floor boards and puts a large white box underneath, containing the Van Adda necklace. However, he reconsiders and double-crosses the mob, taking the necklace. The next day Newman's enforcer, Limehouse Willie, waits until the building is deserted, only to discover the necklace is gone. Seeing Sam Green's packed luggage in his car, Willie incorrectly surmises that he is skipping town with the jewels. He brutally kills Green, even though he does not find the necklace. His suspicion now falls on the Saito family.

The next day, as Akira and Aiko enjoy their first day of business as "Aiko's Japanese Restaurant", Tomoya and Takeshi go out to the local store and are confronted by local bullies eyeing Takeshi's bicycle. Tomoya, who has a red belt in karate, defends his younger brother and beats up the bullies. During the fight, Willie abducts Tomoya and leaves Takeshi with a broken nose when he tries to stop him. Willie phones Akira demanding that he deliver the necklace (of which he knows nothing) to Pier 25 in exchange for his son's life. Curious, he goes into the cigar store and finds the broken door lock, the loose floor boards, and a grey thread from Daly's suit jacket, which shows Daly is left-handed.

Akira arrives empty-handed at the pier and boards one of the ships and is restrained by Willie and his men. Akira's claims that it was a left-handed man in a grey suit that took the necklace. Willie cuts him across the chest and threatens his son with a blow torch. Akira smashes the light above his head and uses his ninja skills to escape with Tomoya. He listens to Aiko and goes to the police the next day. Meanwhile, although Willie is convinced that the necklace is not with the Saitos, Newman still wants them eliminated because of what they know.

At the precinct, Akira speaks with Lt. Anderson. Both Trumble and Daly are there as he identifies Willie from mug shots. Anderson can do nothing to keep him away from the Saitos without evidence, so Akira agrees to help him obtain it. Daly informs Newman and is assured Willie will clean up his mess, but also says they need to have "a little chat".

At the Saitos' apartment, Takeshi accidentally kicks his soccer ball out the window, and Tomoya goes out to recover it. Aiko chases after him and both are run down by Newman's thugs stationed outside in their car. Akira arrives seconds afterwards and recognizes the thugs from the night before and gives chase in his car, then on foot. The resulting struggle results in both men being killed. Tomoya is on life support at the hospital, while Aiko is bruised but still being kept overnight for observation. Anderson arranges for police protection to guard them.

Akira sneaks on board Willie's yacht during a party and cuts the power and sneaks up behind him. With a knife to Willie's throat, he warns him to stay away from the Saitos or he "will pray for death". Akira has vanished by the time the lights come back on. Ignoring the threat, Willie sneaks into the hospital and murders Aiko, but is stopped by Anderson and his men before he can also kill Tomoya. He is able to escape during the confusion. Akira returns to the hospital to have a moment with his wife's body. He swears he will make Willie and his men pay for destroying their dreams by returning to the ninja shadow world. He takes Tomoya out of hospital care against Anderson's warnings that they cannot guarantee police protection if he does so.

Elsewhere, Daly and Trumble meet at a restaurant. Willie shows up and murders them both for their treachery.

Akira relocates the boys to a warehouse. Behind closed doors, he performs rituals that signify his return to the ways of ninjitsu, and, with a makeshift forge, he creates a new ninja-to sword blade. In full ninja garb, Akira prays to Aiko's spirit before donning the helmet his father gave him. He attacks Newman's mansion, dispatching Newman and all his henchmen in what quickly becomes an all-out massacre. Willie is able to escape, but Akira later confronts him when Willie shows up at the warehouse. They fight a protracted duel to the death until Willie ultimately winds up being pinned through his wrists by Akira to a long buzzsaw platform. He opens his mask and Willie recognizes him before Akira turns on the buzzsaw and begins slowly walking away. Willie then begins to beg him to kill him (openly praying for death) as the spinning blade draws in the mobster and slowly slices the screaming Willie in half.

In the final sequence, Akira and his sons are visiting Aiko's grave. As they are leaving, they are approached by Anderson, who discusses the massacre, mentioning that it is rumoured that the assassin was a ninja and asks if they still exist. Akira denies this with Takeshi confirming it and saying the detective has been watching too many ninja movies. Anderson wishes Akira good luck, but as he leaves he tells him that if he sees the ninja to tell him that the police do not want to see him again. He then tosses him a shuriken left behind at the crime scene (it is implied that he knows Akira is the ninja in question). They bow respectfully and part company as the credits begin.

== Cast ==
- Sho Kosugi as Akira Saito
- James Booth as Limehouse Willie
- Donna Kei Benz as Aiko Saito (as Donna K. Benz)
- Norman Burton as Lt. Anderson
- Kane Kosugi as Takeshi Saito
- Shane Kosugi as Tomoya Saito
- Matthew Faison as Sgt. Joe Daley
- Parley Baer as Sam Green
- Robert Ito as Koga
- Michael Constantine as Mr. Newman

== Production ==
When the film was showcased at the Cannes Film Festival, it had a runtime of 123 minutes and was unrated following an X rating from the Motion Picture Association. The film was edited down to 92 minutes and awarded an R rating.

== Reception ==
The film was unfavorably viewed by some film critics. USA Today critic and "drive-in" movie reviewer Joe Bob Briggs both praised Sho Kosugi, stating "Sho Kosugi ... the hottest kick since Chuck Norris and Bruce Lee"! and Briggs praising Kosugi as "the best kung fu man since Bruce Lee" and ranked the film high on his 10-best list for 1986. The last sentence in a review associated with TV Guide reads: "PRAY FOR DEATH isn't merely a good Ninja film, it's a good film, period."

== Home video ==
Pray for Death was released on Blu-ray by Arrow Releasing on a special edition, which contains the following:

- A (1080p) high definition presentation from a transfer of original elements by MGM of the film's unrated version.
- Optional English SDH subtitles for the deaf and hard of hearing.
- A new interview with star Sho Kosugi.
- Archive interview and Ninjutsu demonstration with Kosugi from the film's New York premiere
- Original theatrical trailer.
- Reversible sleeve featuring original and newly commissioned artwork by Matthew Griffin.
- Collector's booklet featuring an extract from Sho Kosugi's book "Yin-Yang Code: The Drums of Tenkai-Bo".
