= Enter the Ninja =

1981 film directed by Menahem Golan

- Theatrical release poster
- Directed by: Menahem Golan
- Screenplay by: Dick Desmond
- Story by: Dick Desmond; Mike Stone
- Produced by: Judd Bernard; Yoram Globus
- Starring: Franco Nero; Sho Kosugi; Susan George; Alex Courtney
- Cinematography: David Gurfinkel
- Edited by: Michael J. Duthie; Mark Goldblatt
- Music by: W. Michael Lewis; Laurin Rinder
- Color process: Metrocolor
- Production company: Golan-Globus Production
- Distributed by: The Cannon Group (United States); Columbia Pictures (international)
- Release date: October 2, 1981
- Running time: 99 minutes
- Country: United States
- Language: English
- Budget: $1.5 million
- Box office: $15 million

Enter the Ninja is a 1981 American martial arts film directed by Menahem Golan and starring Franco Nero, Sho Kosugi, Susan George and Christopher George. Nero plays a martial artist, Cole, who faces a ninja (Kosugi) employed by a wealthy businessman.

The film was originally intended to be directed by Emmett Alston and to star Mike Stone. Early in the production, Alston was replaced by Golan but stayed on as second-unit director, and Stone was replaced with Nero, but stayed on as fight double and fight/stunt coordinator. The film began a craze of ninja-themed Hollywood films during the early 1980s and was the first film in Cannon Films' Ninja Trilogy, an anthology series which includes Revenge of the Ninja (1983) and Ninja III: The Domination (1984). The film launched the career of Sho Kosugi, who appeared in a number of further ninja films and television shows in the 1980s.

== Plot ==
Cole, a mercenary and veteran of the Namibian War of Independence, completes his ninjutsu training in Japan. Cole goes to visit his war buddy Frank Landers and his wife of two years, Mary Ann Landers, who are the owners of a large piece of farming land in the Philippines. Cole soon finds that the Landers are being repeatedly harassed by Charles Venarius, the wealthy CEO of Venarius Industries, in order to get them to sell their property because, unbeknownst to them, a large oil deposit is located beneath their land. Cole thwarts the local henchmen Venarius has hired to bully and coerce the Landers.

Cole and Frank infiltrate Venarius' base, and defeat a number of his henchmen. In the aftermath, Frank gets drunk and confesses to Cole that he is impotent. Mary Ann comes to Cole that night and they have an affair. Venarius, learning that Cole is a ninja, hires a ninja of his own to eliminate Frank and Cole — Hasegawa, who is a rival of Cole from their old training days.

Hasegawa strikes the Landers' estate at night, killing Frank in front of Mary Anne, then abducting her to Venarius' martial arts arena. Cole enters, and picks off the henchmen one by one before ultimately killing Venarius. Hasegawa releases Mary Ann, and the two ninja engage in a final battle. Cole defeats Hasegawa, who begs to be allowed to die with honor. Cole agrees and kills him.

== Cast ==
- Franco Nero as Cole
- Susan George as Mary-Ann Landers
- Sho Kosugi as Hasegawa
- Christopher George as Charles Venarius
- Alex Courtney as Frank Landers
- Will Hare as "Dollars"
- Zachi Noy as Siegfried "The Hook" Schultz
- Constantine Gregory as Mr. Parker (credited as Constantin de Goguel)
- Dale Ishimoto as Komori
- Joonee Gamboa as Mr. Mesuda
- Leo Martinez as "Pee Wee"
- Ken Metcalfe as Elliot
- Subas Herrero as Alberto
- Alan Amiel as Maroon Ninja
- Doug Ivan as Maroon Ninja

== Production ==
Enter the Ninja was based on an original story that Karate champion Mike Stone presented to Menahem Golan of Cannon Films, who became involved in the production in late fall 1980, with the intent of creating an American film about ninjutsu. Metro-Goldwyn-Mayer (MGM) produced the film for $4 million, as part of a multi-project film and television deal with The Cannon Group. The film was initially set to star Stone himself.

Principal photography began on January 12, 1981, in the Philippines and in Tokyo, Japan, (Note: Although planned, no filming was done in Japan. As indicated in the film's closing credits, the entire film was "filmed on location in Manila, The Philippines".) under the direction of Emmett Alston. Shooting began in Manila in February with producer Golan replacing Alston as director and Franco Nero replacing Stone in the lead role. Stone received onscreen credit for the film's story, fight choreography, and stunt coordination. Principal photography concluded in March. The filming location for Venarius Industries was shot at Solar Century Tower in Manila. Komori's dojo and fight scene was filmed at the Japanese Garden in Rizal Park, Manila.

== Release ==
=== Theatrical ===
Cannon planned to screen the film at the Cannes Film Festival, which was followed by promotional material stating the film would be released during the Easter season in 1982. In August 1981, the film opened in Germany and France. The film also played in Arizona in October the same year. The film opened in Los Angeles on April 30, 1982.

=== Home media ===
The film was released on VHS in the 1980s. Kosugi had become popular by the time of its release, which led to Kosugi replacing Nero on the VHS cover. The film was also released on Betamax during the 1980s, but an official US DVD release had long eluded the masses until MGM issued it as part of its Limited Edition Collection (a series of manufactured-on-demand DVD-Rs) in October 2011. The film was released on Blu-ray by Kino Lorber on May 26, 2015, and in a box set from Eureka Video as The Ninja Trilogy with Revenge of the Ninja and Ninja III: The Domination on January 18, 2016.

== Reception ==
=== Critical response ===
On Metacritic the film has a weighted average score of 35 out of 100, based on 5 critics, indicating "generally unfavorable" reviews. Robert Brown of the Monthly Film Bulletin gave Enter the Ninja negative review, stating that it "seems singularly lacking in even the commercial ingredients that made Enter the Dragon such a successful showcase for the kung fu genre ... [Golan] never seems to have decided which genre he was exploiting, and ended up mistakenly crossing romantic drama with martial arts." A review by Hubert Niogret in the French film magazine Positif found the film's only purpose was to create a commercial project that was only popular for less demanding audiences and was only popular in the summer in France where there was little competition for quality cinema. Richard Harrington of The Washington Post wrote that the "plot limps along looking for convenient excuses for Ninjas to enter into brawls", noting that "none of the reasoning, acting or dialogue is particularly bright much less believable" while "the best directing in the film comes from fight choreographer and ex-karate champion Mike Stone, who obviously gets his kicks in".

In a retrospective review, Donald Guarisco of AllMovie stated that film was a "pretty lackluster affair". Guarisco also commented on Franco Nero that it "looks uncomfortable as the ninja expert and fails to perform convincingly during the fight scenes" and that Susan George was wasted as the damsel in distress. Although noting a large amount of fighting scenes in the film, he felt that they did not have skillful choreography and sharp editing to make them visceral for the film. The death scene involving Christopher George has been cited by Slate as one of the "best of the worst death scenes ever".

=== Legacy ===
After the release of Enter the Ninja, there was boom of ninja-related films in the early 1980s. The film's antagonist, played by Sho Kosugi, became more popular than the protagonist played by Franco Nero, which led to Enter the Ninja launching Kosugi's career.

Before the film's release, Golan planned to direct the sequel, Revenge of the Ninja. While remaining as producer, Golan eventually relinquished directorial duties to Sam Firstenberg. Kosugi was cast as the hero. The film was released in 1983. The final film in the series was Ninja III: The Domination, still directed by Firstenberg and produced by Golan, which was released in 1984. While sharing common themes and the presence of Kosugi in a lead role, those three "ninja" films feature wholly unrelated characters and, lacking any continuity, qualify only as an anthology series.

== See also ==
- List of American films of 1981
- List of martial arts films
