= Ninja Assassin =

2009 martial arts film directed by James McTeigue

- Theatrical release poster
- Directed by: James McTeigue
- Screenplay by: Matthew Sand; J. Michael Straczynski
- Story by: Matthew Sand
- Produced by: Joel Silver; The Wachowskis; Grant Hill
- Starring: Rain; Naomie Harris; Rick Yune; Sho Kosugi; Ben Miles
- Cinematography: Karl Walter Lindenlaub
- Edited by: Gian Ganziano; Joseph Jett Sally
- Music by: Ilan Eshkeri
- Production companies: Legendary Pictures; Dark Castle Entertainment; Silver Pictures
- Distributed by: Warner Bros. Pictures
- Release date: November 25, 2009
- Running time: 99 minutes
- Country: United States
- Language: English
- Budget: $30 million
- Box office: $61.6 million

Ninja Assassin is a 2009 martial arts film directed by James McTeigue, from a screenplay by Matthew Sand and J. Michael Straczynski. It stars Rain as a disillusioned assassin from a modern-day ninja clan, looking for retribution against his former mentor, played by Sho Kosugi. The cast also features Naomie Harris, Ben Miles, and Rick Yune. The film was produced by The Wachowskis, Joel Silver and Grant Hill under Legendary Pictures, Dark Castle Entertainment and Silver Pictures. It was distributed by Warner Bros. Pictures, and premiered in theaters across the United States on November 25, 2009. It received generally negative reviews from critics, but was a moderate commercial success.

== Plot ==
The Ozunu Clan, led by the ruthless Lord Ozunu, trains orphans from around the world to become the ultimate ninja assassins to offer assassin services to rich clients. The clan charges 100 pounds worth of gold for their services and always kills any witnesses in the vicinity of their target. Raizo is one of the orphans. The Ozunu Clan's training is extremely brutal, especially for Raizo, since he is to be the successor to Lord Ozunu. The only kindness he ever feels is from a young kunoichi named Kiriko, with whom he eventually develops a romantic bond. As time goes by, Kiriko becomes disenchanted with the Ozunu's routine and decides to abandon it. One rainy night, Kiriko climbs a wall to escape and encourages Raizo to join her, but he chooses to stay. Branded as a traitor, Kiriko is captured and later executed in front of Raizo by her elder ninja brother, Takeshi, who impales her through the heart.

Years later, an adult Raizo is instructed by Lord Ozunu to complete his first assassination to kill a group of gangsters. After the mission, Raizo meets the rest of his clan atop a city skyscraper in Berlin. There, Lord Ozunu orders him to execute a kunoichi traitor. Remembering Kiriko's death, Raizo slashes Lord Ozunu's face with his kyoketsu-shoge and fights against his fellow ninjas. Barely surviving, he falls off the rooftop and into a river. After years, Raizo recovers and trains on his own to intervene in and foil all of Ozunu's assassination attempts. Meanwhile, Europol agent Mika Coretti has been investigating money-linked political murders and finds out that they are possibly connected to the Ozunu. She defies her superior, Ryan Maslow, and retrieves secret agency files to find out more about the investigation. Mika meets Raizo and convinces him to see Maslow for protection, as well as to provide evidence against the Ozunu. However, Raizo is arrested by Maslow and abducted by Europol agents for interrogation.

Although feeling betrayed, Mika is assured by Maslow that he is still on her side and gives her a tracking device for emergencies. The Ozunu ninjas infiltrate the Europol safe house, where Raizo is being held, in an attempt to kill him and everybody inside. Mika frees Raizo, and they both manage to escape, but Raizo suffers near-fatal wounds. Mika then takes him to a motel to hide. Resting in the motel, Mika implants the tracking device into Raizo, as the ninjas remain in pursuit. Unable to fend off the Ozunu, she hides outside the motel until Special Forces arrive to help her. By the time they arrive, the ninjas have already kidnapped Raizo, bringing him before Lord Ozunu for execution. During the transport back to the Ozunu, Raizo uses his ninja techniques to heal his own wounds. Europol Special Forces and tactical teams led by Maslow storm the secluded Ozunu retreat (nestled in the mountains) using the tracking device on Raizo. Turning the night into day by saturating the sky above with powerful flares, the military forces can fight the ninjas on their own terms. In the confusion, Mika frees Raizo from his bindings. He proceeds to kill Takeshi and confront Lord Ozunu in a sword duel. Mika interferes to help but gets stabbed by Lord Ozunu. Enraged, Raizo uses a "shadow blending" technique for the first time to distract and kill Lord Ozunu. Mika, seemingly fatally wounded, is in fact saved by a quirk of birth: her heart is actually on the right side of her chest. With the Ozunu defeated, Europol leaves, and Raizo stays behind in the ruins of the Ozunu retreat. Climbing the same wall Kiriko did in the past, he looks out at the surrounding countryside and breathes with a smile, feeling his freedom for the first time.

== Cast ==
- Rain as Raizo, one of the world's deadliest assassins and lover of Kiriko.
  - Sungwoong Yoon as young Raizo
  - Lee Joon as teenage Raizo
- Naomie Harris as Europol Agent Mika Coretti
- Ben Miles as Europol Agent Ryan Maslow, Mika's superior.
- Rick Yune as Takeshi, the leader of a team sent by the Ozunu Clan.
- Sho Kosugi as Lord Ozunu, the leader of the Ozunu Ninja Clan.
- Randall Duk Kim as Tattoo Master
- Anna Sawai as Kiriko, Raizo's lover
  - Kylie Liya Goldstein as young Kiriko
- Sung Kang as "Hollywood"
- Jonathan Chan-Pensley as Yakuza Henchman
- Ill-Young Kim as Yakuza Mohawk
- Yuki Iwamoto as Yakuza Couch
- Linh-Dan Pham as Pretty Ninja
- Yu Fang as Laundromat Manager
- Adriana Altaras as Landlady
- Eleonore Weisgerber as Mrs. Sabatin
- Wladimir Tarasjanz as Aleksei Sabatin
- Kai Fung Rieck as Teenage Takeshi
- Thorston Manderlay as Europol Agent Zabranski
- Richard Van Weyden as Ibn Battuta
- Mina Ghousi as Kid with Envelope
- Hans Hohlbein as Mika's Neighbor
- Stephen Marcus as Kingpin
- Nhi Ngoc Nguyen-Hermann as Girl On Roof
- Guido Föhrweisser as Lead Europol Agent
- Tim Williams as Europol Cell Guard
- David Leitch as Europol Door Guard
- Wolfgang Stegemann as Europol Pointman
- Steffen Groth as Europol Guard
- Jens Neuhaus as Europol Guard
- Patrick Pinheiro as Maslow's Aide
- Matthias Schendel as Task Force Agent
- Johannes Ahn as Medic

== Production ==
One day, I got a call from the Wachowskis, who are friends of mine. And they said we need some help with something. Can you meet us tomorrow and talk about something? I met with them, and they had a draft for this movie called Ninja Assassin, which wasn't where they wanted it to be. And they said we need a whole new draft, a whole new script, and we will go to camera in six weeks. And I said, "Okay, when do you have to have the scripts?" And they said it had to go out to the actors that Friday. So I went home and put on a pot of coffee, and I wrote a whole new script essentially in 53 hours.
—J. Michael Straczynski, writer

Ninja Assassin was directed by James McTeigue, who had previously worked with producers The Wachowskis and Joel Silver on V for Vendetta four years prior. The Wachowskis were inspired to make the film by actor Rain's impressive ninja-based fight scenes in their 2008 film Speed Racer. The initial screenplay was written by Matthew Sand, and was rewritten by J. Michael Straczynski only six weeks before filming due to the Wachowskis' initial dissatisfaction. Martial Artist turned actor Sho Kosugi had previously starred in several ninja movies playing ninja villains and heroes several times in the 1980s, and had become a cult icon, hence his role as the antagonist Lord Ozunu, named after En no Ozunu, a 7th-century Japanese mystic and one of the developers of ninjutsu. "If you've ever watched any ninja films from the 1980s, you know that Sho Kosugi is the ninja; he is the man," asserts McTeigue.

Medienboard Berlin-Brandenburg provided filmmakers US$1 million in funding, and Germany's Federal Film Fund provided an additional US$9 million to the film's funding.

=== Filming ===
Principal photography began in Paris, France, at the end of April 2008. Filming took place in Eiffel Tower Studios and on location throughout Paris.

McTeigue cited various influences in filming Ninja Assassin such as the films Panic in the Streets (1950), The Getaway (1972), Badlands (1973), Ninja Scroll (1993), and the anime Samurai Champloo (2004–2005). Actor Collin Chou was originally cast for an undisclosed lead role after Jet Li turned down an offer to appear in it, but Chou later left the role.

== Marketing ==
=== Video game ===
On November 5, 2009, Warner Bros. Interactive Entertainment released the video game application based on the film for iPhone devices.

== Release ==
The film was released in the United States on November 25, 2009.

=== Critical response ===
The film was not very well received by critics. On Rotten Tomatoes, 26% of 117 critics gave the film positive reviews, with an average rating of 4.40/10. The site's consensus reads "Overly serious and incomprehensibly edited, Ninja Assassin fails to live up to the promise of its title." On Metacritic, which assigns a weighted average score out of 100 to reviews from mainstream critics, the film received an average score of 34% based on 20 reviews, indicating "generally unfavorable reviews". While critics generally panned the film as a melange of gore scenes without a convincing plot, some critics commended the film's numerous action scenes. Audiences surveyed by CinemaScore gave the film a grade "B" on scale of A+ to F.

Mick LaSalle of the San Francisco Chronicle described the film as "a gorefest, a borefest and a snorefest." Joe Williams of the St. Louis Post-Dispatch opined that "this amateurish action flick is so lacking in personality or punch, it ought to be titled 'V for Video Store Discount Bin.'"

Entertainment Weekly's Chris Nashawaty wrote "...this slick slice of martial-arts mayhem from the producers of The Matrix is awash in blood. It spurts and sprays in geysers. And it never lets up. There's a brutal (and admittedly very cool) fight scene every five minutes... But let's be honest, killing is this film's business... and business is good."

=== Box office ===
Ninja Assassin opened at #6 at the North American box office earning $13,316,158 in its first opening weekend. The film grossed $61,601,280, of which $38,122,883 was from North America. In Japan, this film opened on March 6, 2010, in only one movie theater in Shinjuku and then also opened on March 20 in Osaka. Ninja Assassin earned 2,214,000 yen (Approximately $25,672 U.S.) during its first opening weekend in Shinjuku.

=== Awards ===
On June 9, 2010, Rain was awarded the "Biggest Badass" award on the MTV Movie Awards for his work in Ninja Assassin.

== Home media ==
Ninja Assassin was released on DVD, Blu-ray Disc and streaming formats on March 16, 2010.

== See also ==
- Ninja films
- Samurai films
