= Keiko Suzuka =

Japanese actress (1955–2023)

Keiko Suzuka

Keiko Suzuka (鈴鹿景子, Suzuka Keiko, November 21, 1955 – July 18, 2023) was a Japanese actress.

== Life and career ==
Keiko Suzuka was born on November 21, 1955.

Suzuka starred in the 1976–1977 NHK daytime television series (asadora) Hi no Kuni ni, and had had multiple guest-star roles in prime-time jidaigeki such as Mito Kōmon and Abarenbō Shōgun. She had also appeared as a voice actor in a 1982 production of Aladdin and the Magic Lamp. Keiko had also appeared in film.

Keiko Suzuka died on July 18, 2023, at the age of 67.

== Tokusatsu ==
- Ninja Sentai Kakuranger: Rokurokubi (ep, 1 - 2)
