= Ninja Sentai Kakuranger =

Television series

- Title card
- Genre: Tokusatsu; Superhero fiction; Adventure; Comedy; Japanese-style Western
- Created by: Toei
- Developed by: Noboru Sugimura
- Directed by: Yoshiaki Kobayashi; Taro Sakamoto; Takeshi Ogasawara; Katsuya Watanabe; Shohei Tojo; Hiroshi Butsuda
- Starring: Teruaki Ogawa; Satomi Hirose; Hiroshi Tsuchida; Shu Kawai; Kane Kosugi; Akira Sakamoto; Kenichi Endō; Takayuki Godai; Sanyūtei Enjō
- Narrated by: Sanyūtei Enjō
- Opening theme: "Secret Kakuranger" by Tu Chee Chen
- Ending theme: "Ninja! Matenrō Kids" by Tu Chee Chen
- Composer: Eiji Kawamura
- Country of origin: Japan
- Original language: Japanese
- No. of episodes: 53 (list of episodes)

Production
- Producers: Atsushi Kaji; Takeyuki Suzuki; Shigenori Takadera; Kōichi Yada; Susumu Yoshikawa
- Production location: Tokyo, Japan (Greater Tokyo Area)
- Running time: approx. 25 minutes
- Production company: Toei

Original release
- Network: TV Asahi
- Release: February 18, 1994 – February 24, 1995

Related
- Gosei Sentai Dairanger; Chouriki Sentai Ohranger

Ninja Sentai Kakuranger (忍者戦隊カクレンジャー, Ninja Sentai Kakurenjā; Ninja Squadron Kakuranger) (Note: "Kakuranger" translates as "Hidden Rangers".) is a Japanese television tokusatsu series broadcast by TV Asahi. The series is the 18th installment of Super Sentai. Directed by Yoshiaki Kobayashi, Taro Sakamoto, Takeshi Ogasawara, Katsuya Watanabe, Shohei Tojo and Hiroshi Butsuda, it stars Teruaki Ogawa, Satomi Hirose, Hiroshi Tsuchida, Shu Kawai, Kane Kosugi, Akira Sakamoto, Kenichi Endō, Takayuki Godai and Sanyūtei Enjō. It aired from February 18, 1994 to February 24, 1995, replacing Gosei Sentai Dairanger and was replaced by Chouriki Sentai Ohranger. The name given to this series by Toei for international distribution is Ninja Rangers.

Action footage from the series was used in the third season of Mighty Morphin Power Rangers and Mighty Morphin Alien Rangers. The core Zyuranger costumes from Kyōryū Sentai Zyuranger and the Kiba Ranger costume from Gosei Sentai Dairanger were mainly used in the third season of Mighty Morphin Power Rangers while the core Kakuranger costumes were used in Mighty Morphin Alien Rangers. In January 2016, Shout! Factory announced that they would release "Ninja Sentai Kakuranger: The Complete Series" on DVD in North America. Kakuranger was released on DVD in North America on May 17, 2016. This is the third Super Sentai Series to be released in North America. In addition on May 22, 2017, Shout! streamed the series on their website. From 2024 to 2026, the series was available in North America on Tubi.

== Plot ==
Four hundred years ago, the ninja and the Youkai had a great war. The legendary Sarutobi Sasuke and four other ninjas sealed the Youkai Commander Nurarihyon and all his Youkai's energies away in a cave protected by the "Seal Door". In the present, one of the few remaining Youkai, Kappa, tricks Sarutobi Sasuke and Kirigakure Saizo's descendants, Sasuke and Saizou, into releasing the Youkai by opening the Seal Door. Now these two, joined by three other descendants of great ninjas, become the Kakurangers to fight the reinvigorated Youkai with the aid of the Three God Generals. However, the Kakurangers have their work cut out for them as the Youkai are slowly being united under one banner.

== Characters ==
The Kakurangers (and Ninjaman in back) transformed. From left to right: Saizou, Jiraiya, Sasuke, Tsuruhime, and Seikai.

=== Kakurangers ===
The eponymous Kakurangers are each named after a legendary ninja and master of the Kakure Style (隠流, Kakure-ryū) ninjutsu. Outside of battle, they run a mobile crepe shop with the sentient Nekomaru (ネコマル) food truck. Their special team attack is the Kakure Shoot (カクレシュート, Kakure Shūto) via the Kakuranger Ball (カクレンジャーボール, Kakurenjā Bōru).

The team utilizes Kakure Medal (カクレメダル, Kakure Medaru) coins in conjunction with inro-like Doron Changer (ドロンチェンジャー, Doron Chenjā) devices to transform. While transformed, each member carries a Kakuremaru (カクレマル) ninjatō, which allows them to perform the Lightning Wave (雷光波, Raikō Nami) finisher, a Kaku Laser (カクレイザー, Kaku Reizā) handgun, which can be reconfigured into the Laser Knife (レイザーナイフ, Reizā Naifu) dagger, and a Shinobi Knuckle (シノビナックル, Shinobi Nakkuru), which can combine with either their personal weapons or a grappling device, as their sidearms. By combining their Shark Machine (シャークマシン, Shāku Mashin) motorcycles, they form the Shark Driver (シャークドライバー, Shāku Doraibā) to destroy human-sized Youkai.

Sasuke (サスケ)/Ninja Red (ニンジャレッド, Ninja Reddo)
The 26 year old descendant of Sarutobi Sasuke and the team's agile second-in-command. He is a dirty-minded, reckless hothead whose faults are outweighed by being good-hearted and loyal. While looking for his Shinobi Scroll, Sasuke's time with Reika allows him to gain a resolve to protect all life on Earth from the Youkai. He has a little cousin named Kosuke. He corresponds to Sun Wukong.

During the events of the web-exclusive anniversary special Ninja Sentai Kakuranger: Act Three - Middle-Aged Struggles, Sasuke travels all over Japan to help good Youkai live in human society.

As Ninja Red, Sasuke wields the Red Slicer (レッドスライサー, Reddo Suraisā) shuriken. He also rides the thresher shark-themed Shark Bleeder (シャークブリッダー, Shāku Buriddā), which forms the Shark Driver's projectile. Later in the series, he acquires the Hikarimaru (ヒカリマル) short sword.

Tsuruhime XXIV (鶴姫)/Ninja White (ニンジャホワイト, Ninja Howaito)
The 15 year old (16 during Part 2 of the series) team leader and the twenty-fourth protector of the Seal Door. She's descended from the feudal lords who eagerly answered the call to fight the Youkai, and was named after Ōhōri Tsuruhime. She comes off as a strong girl with a displeasure of her upbringing as a rich girl. She is looking for her missing father Hakumenro. She once fought alongside two other girls, Yukiyo and Tsukiyo Yamazaki, as a member of the Punishment Sailor Sisters. While looking for her Shinobi Scroll, Tsuruhime underwent a test of her character to understand her position as team leader. She corresponds to Xuanzang.

During the events of Kaizoku Sentai Gokaiger, Tsuruhime was originally supposed to grant the Great Power of the Kakurangers to the Gokaigers, which was Ninjaman. However, the Gokaigers managed to discover and release Ninjaman before being approached by her. She then decided to allow Ninjaman to grant the Great Power to the Gokaigers, impressed at the fact that they found and freed him on their own.

During the events of the web-exclusive anniversary special Ninja Sentai Kakuranger: Act Three - Middle-Aged Struggles, Tsuruhime runs a children's home.

As Ninja White, Tsuruhime wields the two-pronged White Beak (ホワイトビーク, Howaito Bīku) dagger.

Saizou (サイゾウ, Saizō)/Ninja Blue (ニンジャブルー, Ninja Burū)
The 22 year old descendant of Kirigakure Saizō. He is an easily flattered man who thinks he is a lot smarter than he really is. He likes to help other people, making him popular among children, though he is unlucky in most things. He is constantly chattering and his way of talking is a little feminine. He corresponds to Sha Wujing.

During the events of the web-exclusive anniversary special Ninja Sentai Kakuranger: Act Three - Middle-Aged Struggles, Saizou still runs the team's mobile crepe shop with Nekomaru.

As Ninja Blue, Saizou wields the Blue Shot (ブルーショット, Burū Shotto) water gun. He also rides the hammerhead shark-themed Shark Slider (シャークスライダー, Shāku Suraidā), which has a sidecar for Tsuruhime that forms the front of the Shark Driver's ramp.

Seikai (セイカイ)/Ninja Yellow (ニンジャイエロー, Ninja Ierō)
The 24 year old descendant of Miyoshi Seikai. He refused to battle at first, but changes his mind when he saw Rokurokubi kidnap children. He is driven by his desire for food, sleep, video games, and women. He is indecisive, but inherits unusual strength from his ancestor. He corresponds to Zhu Bajie.

During the events of the web-exclusive anniversary special Ninja Sentai Kakuranger: Act Three - Middle-Aged Struggles, Seikai is a successful and wealthy antiques dealer.

As Ninja Yellow, Seikai wields the Yellow Claw (イエロークロー, Ierō Kurō). He also rides the sawshark-themed Shark Launcher (シャークランチャー, Shāku Ranchā), which has a sidecar for Jiraiya that forms the back of the Shark Driver's ramp.

Jiraiya (ジライヤ)/Ninja Black (ニンジャブラック, Ninja Burakku)
The 20 year old descendant of Jiraiya. He is a Japanese-American ninja from Los Angeles trained by his guardian Gali after his father, who was a police officer, was killed by the Youkai (but was later revealed to have been killed by Gali himself). Jiraiya stands out among the characters because he speaks English frequently (which at first caused both teasing and confusion with the other team members), though he learns Japanese as the show progresses. He is a big fan of Japanese ninja movies. In his first appearance, Jiraiya was helping the Youkai. In reality, he did so to steal four scrolls, previously stolen by Azukiarai, to allow him and three of the other Kakurangers, (Sasuke already had his), to become Beast Generals. He expresses a cowboy/surfer persona and is the pure fighter of the group. Although he knows Earth-based Ninja Arts, he prefers to fight with his martial art skills. While looking for his Shinobi Scroll, Jiraiya was forced to battle Gali, who revealed himself as the man who killed his father and served the Youkai. After the battle between them, Jiraiya learned why Gali did it, as well as was hoping the former would kill him. The deaths of Zashiki-warashi and the two men he had known since childhood gives Jiraiya a reason to fight the Youkai. He is the only member with no corresponding Journey to the West character, but Yulong the horse also has no corresponding Kakuranger character.

During the events of the web-exclusive anniversary special Ninja Sentai Kakuranger: Act Three - Middle-Aged Struggles, Jiraiya works as a USA paranormal investigator.

As Ninja Black, Jiraiya wields the Black Bow (ブラックボウ, Burakku Bō).

=== Allies ===
==== Ninjaman ====
Ninjaman (ニンジャマン), despite being a bit of a high-strong klutz, is the blue-colored pupil of the Three God Generals who battled the Youkai a millennium ago. However, after being tricked by Daimaou into hurting humans on the notion that they were Youkai in disguise, he gets sent into space within a Jar of Seals that only those of the Tsuruhime line can shatter. Upon returning to Earth, Ninjaman is found by Junichi and his sister Mitsuko before the three find themselves attacked by the Youkai Bakuki under orders from Daimaou to capture Ninjaman to become the Youkai leader's retainer. Luckily, once freed by Tsuruhime, Ninjaman becomes an ally to the Kakurangers. After Daimaou's defeat, he departs with his masters and says goodbye to the Kakurangers. However, this time resulting from not holding back, Ninjaman is sealed again for a few decades before being freed by the Gokaigers and helping them receive the Greater power of his Kakuranger friends.

As a ninja master, Ninjaman wields the Ninja Sword (ニンジャソード, Ninja Sōdo) katana and possesses a wide array of Ninja Arts at his command, including the Art of Fire Escape (火とんの術, Katon no Jutsu), and size manipulation to aid his mentors and the Kakurangers in their fights. He can also ride on the Kinto Cloud (きんと雲, Kinto Kumo).

Whenever a Youkai calls him a "novice" (青二才, Aonisai), Ninjaman gets angry enough to change into his true samurai-like form, Samuraiman (サムライマン), via the command "Anger Explosion!" (怒り爆発, Ikari Bakuhatsu). In this form, he combines the Ninja Sword and its sheath to form the Samurai Javelin (サムライジャベリン, Samurai Jaberin). His finishers in this form are the Samurai Rage Bomber (サムライ激怒ボンバー, Samurai Gekido Bonbā) via explosive energy spheres formed from his rage and the Samurai Rage Slash (サムライ激怒斬り, Samurai Gekido Giri) via the Samurai Javelin.

During the events of Kaizoku Sentai Gokaiger, Ninjaman was freed from a pot by the Gokaigers. Once freed, he decided to observe the Gokaigers to see if the team was worthy of the Greater Power of the Kakurangers. Eventually they impressed him enough to grant them the Greater Power, which turned out to be himself.

==== Kōshakushi ====
The Kōshakushi (講釈師) is a kimono-wearing anchorman who served as the series narrator. During episode 39, the Kōshakushi and his news crew wanted to know more about the Kakurangers, getting into their personal lives. They followed a pair of Dorodoro to Junior's mansion, learning of Nopperabou's revival ability until Daimou sensed them and sicced the Dorodoro on them. While the others escaped, the Kōshakushi was caught and thrown off a bridge, though he managed to survive.

==== Sandayuu Momochi ====
Sandayuu Momochi (百地 三太夫, Momochi Sandayū) is a ninja master who instructs the Kakurangers on their abilities and is considered dangerous by the Youkai. Being a former student of Hakumenro, Sandayuu aided the Kakurangers when Gashadokuro set up the beginning phase of Daimaou's resurrection, warning the Kakurangers they are not ready to face him. But the Kakurangers refused to accept that and are quickly defeated before Sandayuu had Tsubasamaru bring them the Wind Illusion Castle to see the Three God Generals, revealing their origins and that obtaining the Shinobi Scrolls are needed to stop Daimaou. While Tsuruhime was looking for her Shinobi Scroll, she is found by Sandayuu and taken to her family's mansion. There, Sandayuu uses her quest as a test to prove her worth as the Kakurangers' leader and heir to her family legacy, providing her with karakuri replicas of her teammates. He briefly meets with Hakumenro, whom he was working with, to rescue Tsuruhime when Hakumenro fought her. However, Junior learned of this and impaled Sandayuu with his own katana. Sandayuu lived long enough from the wound to tell the team to form Kakure Daishogun during their final fight with Gashadokuro and give them his final words.

==== Zashiki-warashi ====
Zashiki-warashi (ザシキワラシ) is a Youkai mushroom child who uses mushrooms to perform spells and wants to make children happy, pursued by Junior who planned to turn him evil. Though Ninja Black attempts to protect him from Gashadokuro, Zashiki-warashi turns him in and undergoes a ritual to turn him into an evil video game controller-themed version of his true form. Attacking the city in his enlarged form, Zashiki-warashi overpowers the Beast General Fighters until hearing the cries of the children he befriended manages to restore him to normal. However, horrified at what he done to the city, Zashiki-warashi attempts to fight Gashadokuro and is mortally wounded. Found by Jiraiya, Zashiki-warashi turns back into a mushroom.

Zashiki-warashi's human form is portrayed by Kazuyuki Makino (牧野 一進, Makino Kazuyuki) while his Youkai form is voiced by Sumiyo Sawada (沢田 澄代, Sawada Sumiyo).

==== Reika ====
Reika (玲花) was a butterfly given human form by Sasuke's Shinobi Scroll to find him as he arrives to Nasukogen, tending to his wounds after he was attacked by Junior. However, wanting to experience being human, Reika ends up going on a detour to Rindo Lake Family Farm while trying to get Sasuke to lighten up. But when mortally wounded by Ittanmomen while trying to get a bunny to safety, Reika directs Sasuke to the scroll's location before dying and reverting to her true form as she dissolves.

Reika is portrayed by Reiko Chiba (千葉 麗子, Chiba Reiko).

==== Bun ====
Bun (ブン) is a Youkai who despises the Youkai way due to being teased by other Youkai. Said to be Sandayuu's apprentice, Bun has been helping Hakumenro in secret, rescuing Sasuke and company when they are blasted into the raging river. In the end of series, he remains with Hakumenro after he is finally freed of Daimaou's control.

During the events of the web-exclusive anniversary special Ninja Sentai Kakuranger: Act Three - Middle-Aged Struggles, Bun works at a children's home run by Tsuruhime.

Bun is portrayed by Yasuyuki Fukuda (福田 康之, Fukuda Yasuyuki), who is credited under Yasuyuki Takamine (貴峰 康之, Takamine Yasuyuki) in Ninja Sentai Kakuranger: Act Three - Middle-Aged Struggles.

==== Taro and Jiro ====
Taro (太郎, Tarō) and Jiro (次郎, Jirō) are the twin sons of vassals to Tsuruhime's family, becoming her adopted brothers when their parents, who were once vassals of the Tsuruhime house, had died. When Tsuruhime's father Yoshiteru learned of Daimaou, the brothers accompanied him into the Youkai World to kill the demon before he could be fully revived. However, Taro and Jiro were captured and turned into German Shepherds after Yoshiteru agreed to serve Daimaou in return for their lives spared. However, though the brothers can temporarily regain human form, they can only do it once with a second time killing them. As a result, after escaping back to their world with Bun, Taro and Jiro looked after Tsuruhime in their master's place before revealing their true nature to Sasuke in order to give him Hakumenro's findings on Daradara while asking him to tell Tsuruhime that they will protect her from the shadows. The two eventually return and sacrifice themselves to free Hakumenro from the Youkai.

Taro and Jiro are portrayed by Daisuke Tsuchiya (土屋 大輔, Tsuchiya Daisuke) and Keisuke Tsuchiya (土屋 圭輔, Tsuchiya Keisuke) respectively, the latter previously portraying Kazu of Gosei Sentai Dairanger and the former playing Kazu's clone in one episode of Dairanger.

==== Gali ====
Gali (ガリ, Gari) was a Japanese American karate teacher who is an old friend of Jiraiya's father, but also an indentured servant of Nue who is infused with Youkai energy and armed with a claw weapon. Gali's servitude started in 1986 when his daughter is mortally wounded after a car crash, accepting Nue's offer to save his child in return for murdering Jiraiya's father. Though he committed the deed, Gali realized the consequences of orphaning Jiraiya. As penance, he was blackmailed into continuing Nue's dirty work, becoming Jiraiya's guardian and teaching him martial arts with the hope that his student might kill him. Gali's intent was achieved when Nue sends him after Jiraiya when he was looking for his Shinobi Scroll, revealing the truth of his father's murder to have Jiraiya fight him without restraint. Though Jiraiya could not kill him at the last minute, a mortally wounded Gali reveals the truth behind the murder and, in his final words, asks his student to defeat those who use others from the shadows. Soon after, Gali was buried by Jiraiya out of respect.

Gali is portrayed by Sho Kosugi (ショー・コスギ, Shō Kosugi).

==== Hakumenro ====
Hakumenro (白面郎, Hakumenrō; "White Masked Man") is an armored samurai who is revealed to be Tsuruhime's father Yoshiteru (義輝). Ten years prior, Yoshiteru researched the Youkai and learned of Daimaou's existence. Fearing the danger that would occur if Daimaou is revived, Yoshiteru is forced to leave his young daughter behind as he attempted to destroy Daimaou before he could return. However, with Taro and Jiro captured, Yoshiteru was forced to aid Daimaou as his tactician Hakumenro. However, Hakumenro uses his servitude as a ruse to uncover Daimaou's weakness. Upon arriving to oversee the final steps of Daimaou's arrival, with the Youkai's son Gashadokuro distrustful of him, Hakumenro is forced to fight his own daughter to keep face while arranging for her safety by his former student, Sandayuu, with orders to make the Kakurangers believe that he is beyond redemption. However, due to Daradara's creation as he attempts to find out the clone's weakness, Hakumenro learns that Daimaou knew of his true intentions yet allowed his presence until he served his purpose. Before being captured by Daimaou, he left a clue for Sasuke that showed him how to defeat Daradara, as well as a map Daimaou's hideout. Though turned into stone by a furious Daimaou over his role in the Youkai's defeat, Daimaou gave Hakumenro to Yamauba as her trump card against the Kakurangers. However, after Taro and Jiro sacrificed themselves to save him, Yoshiteru is reunited with his daughter.

==== Yamazaki Sisters ====
Yukiyo Yamazaki (山咲 雪代, Yamazaki Yukiyo) and Tsukiyo Yamazaki (山咲 月代, Yamazaki Tsukiyo) are a pair of sisters who are Tsuruhime's childhood friends and are of a ninja family. As a result, treating Tsuruhime as family, the three of them formed a Sukeban Deka-like group called the Punishment Sailor Sisters (おしおきセーラー三姉妹(シスターズ), Oshioki Sērā Shisutāzu) who put bullies in their place. When their younger sister Hanayo told them of strange events going on at her school, Yukiyo and Tsukiyo are reunited with Tsuruhime as they reformed the Punishment Sailor Sisters to go after Kamaitachi. Soon after, the Yamazaki sisters thank Tsuruhime for helping them while asking her to call if she ever gets in trouble.

The Punishment Sailor Sisters is a parody of tokusatsu show Keeping-Words Sisters Chouchoutrian, the last entry in the Toei Fushigi Comedy Series with references to Sailor Moon and Crayon Shin-Chan which Yamazaki Sister actresses Noriko Tanaka (田中 規子, Tanaka Noriko) and Kei Ishibashi (石橋 けい, Ishibashi Kei) as well as Tsuruhime's actress, Satomi Hirose, were all a part of.

=== Youkai Army Corps ===
The Youkai Army Corps (妖怪軍団, Yōkai Gundan; "Strange Apparition Army Corps") were sealed away 400 years ago by the Kakurangers' ancestors and have now changed their forms to keep up with the times. Most Youkai have a human form and use the Ninja Arts themselves. When defeated, they summon lightning made of human despair and misery to strike them, causing them to grow into giants.

==== Daimaou ====
Daimaou (大魔王, Daimaō; "Great Demon King") is a 1,199-year-old warlock-themed Youkai born from the amassed hatred of humans who originally led the Youkai Army Corps before being sealed in the Demon Seal Gate long ago by the Three God Generals in their original human forms. He also played a role in Ninjaman's sealing and exile a thousand years prior by tricking the hero into attacking humans. In present day, Daimaou has his son Gashadokuro set up preparations for his coming into the human world by gathering children's souls to begin a ritual to resurrect him within a month's time. Though Super Kakure Daishogun destroyed it, the Seal Door reformed itself and Daimaou emerges, turning the altar into his base of operations. When Ninjaman returns, Daimaou employs Bakuki to capture the ninja to make him into his retainer for his own agenda. But as the Kakurangers freed Ninjaman, Daimaou decides to let his target be at the moment though he briefly battles the Kakurangers when they ruined his 1,200th birthday party prior to falling back after being overwhelmed by Super Muteki Shogun.

After his 1,200th birthday, Daimaou gained the power to spawn clones of himself as he created Daradara to aid him in wiping out the Three God Generals by putting them in a predicament through Daradara siphoning the powers of Ninjaman and four of the Kakurangers. However, due to Hakumenro giving Ninja Red the means to ruin his scheme with Junior's manor destroyed in the process and managing to escape after being wounded by a combination of Super Muteki Shogun's Muteki Cannon Full Discharge and Super Kakure Daishogun's Iron Fist Flying Finish, Daimaou turns the human into stone before establishing himself in a new base of operations: The flying skull fortress Skull Castle (ガイコツ城, Gaikotsujō) with plans to build the Youkai Kingdom on Earth and destroy the Kakurangers. After the death of his younger brother Daidarabotchi, having severed his ties to him and their sister long ago so he can focus on establishing the Youkai Kingdom, Daimaou decides to employ his sister in a scheme to have Tsuruhime fall into despair. But when the plan failed, crashing the Skull Castle on them, Daimaou provokes the Kakurangers into killing him so the evil comprising his body would consume humanity to renew the Youkai. But when the Three God Generals instruct the Kakurangers to capture him without transforming, Daimaou ups the ante before the ninjas realize the Seal Door is the collective heart of humanity. Though he attempted to escape capture, Daimaou is gravely weakened by the Three God Generals and Ninjaman before being entombed behind the Seal Door where the Youkai are reconstituted.

==== Nurarihyon ====
Nurarihyon (ヌラリヒョン) is a Youkai who attempted to unite the Youkai army years ago after Daimaou's sealing. However, Nurarihyon ended up being defeated by the ancestors of the Kakurangers and sealed away.

Nurarihyon is voiced by Yoshimasa Chida (千田 義正, Chida Yoshimasa).

==== Gashadokuro ====
Gashadokuro (ガシャドクロ) is an infamous Youkai who is one of their race's leading figures. He is a brute who happily slaughters any human he comes across and loves to rock but plays the piano when he is in a bad mood. He normally appears to the Kakurangers in the guise of Young Noble Junior (貴公子ジュニア, Kikōshi Junia), a bleached blonde leather punk, but can revert to his true militant skeleton form when pumped. Uniting the Youkai under him, Junior is bent on killing off most of the humans to create a Youkai paradise. He made his first direct attack on the Kakurangers with the Shuten Douji brothers. He then made it personal for the Kakurangers by murdering Zashiki-warashi after failing to turn him evil. Though they almost got him during the trap he set up with Tsuchigumo, Junior escapes via a hot-air balloon. Junior eventually begins to carry out the ritual to summon his father Daimaou back into the world, sending Umibouzu to capture five children to begin the ritual and using his music to petrify the remaining ten to complete the ritual. As a result, Gashadokuro is infused with Daimaou's power and is beyond the Kakurangers' ability to fight as he takes the skull-like altar he created on a building and the surrounding district into the sky beyond the Kakurangers' reach so Daimaou's resurrection can be uninterrupted as he turns the humans trapped in the barrier to stone. While Gashadokuro appears to be completely heartless to even his lackeys and more relentless in combat, he does have some respect for the Kakuranger, as seen when he allowed his Dorodoro to give water to the Kappa-ized Seikai and Saizou to fight Nue.

Once all the Kakurangers had obtained the Shinobi Scrolls, Junior assumes his true form to battle the Super Ninja Beasts and stop them from destroying the Sealed Door. However, he is overpowered by them until Hakumenro intervened. The fact that he had to be saved by the very human whom Daimaou prizes above him drove Junior to have Hakumenro prove himself to him by killing the Kakurangers. But after mortally wounding Sandayuu when he aided Hakumenro in saving the Kakurangers, Junior assumes his true form and overpowered the Kakurangers at first until Sasuke receives Hikarimaru to defeat Gashadokuro. Gashadokuro refuses to accept defeat and enlarges, fighting the Super Ninja Beasts once again with the laser cannon he had Yugami make for him. With this new gear, he gained an attack called Crush Beam (クラッシュビーム, Kurasshu Bīmu). But the tables turned when the team formed Kakure Daishogun, and then Super Kakure Daishogun, stripping off his gear before killing him. Soon after, Daimaou states that Gashadokuro was no more than a fool to think he would be his heir though vowed to avenge him nonetheless. The mansion Gashadokuro had occupied served as his father's base of operations before it was eventually destroyed.

During the events of the web-exclusive anniversary special Ninja Sentai Kakuranger: Act Three - Middle-Aged Struggles, Junior is revealed to be resurrected with his secret reincarnation technique he used just before his death. Losing his memories of being Gashadokuro and living as a human, he had a son, Goro, with his human wife before a car accident orchestrated by Gerbera killed his wife and left him in a coma. Upon a grown-up Goro's awakening as Sanmoto Gorozaemon, Junior regained consciousness and all of his memories and sacrificed himself to turn his son back into a human.

==== Dr. Yugami ====
Dr. Yugami (ユガミ博士, Yugami-hakase) is a Youkai scientist who enjoys the suffering of children and develops various weapons to aid his kind. Originally under the employment of Tengu, Yugami used the boys that Tengu kidnapped to create the Youkai Replicas. But after Tengu's defeat, Yugami flees from the town and eventually enters the service of Junior, providing the Youkai prince with mechanical weapons and armor for the other Youkai serving him. He appeared to cheer Gashadokuro on during the final stages of their plan until he was horrified to see his master destroyed. He was killed by a slim piece of the Seal Door which was shattered by Super Kakure Daishogun.

==== Nue ====
Nue (ヌエ) is a legend among the Youkai who abandoned his "undignified" archaic appearance for a new form that combines the elements of an eagle, a lion, and a snake with the power of tigers undiminished through the ages. The source of his power came from the tattoo on his left shoulder. Around the year 1986, Nue founded an organization of assassins in Los Angeles and enlisted the services of Gali to eliminate Jiraiya's father when he stumbled upon his activities.

Seeing Gashadokuro unfit to lead the Youkai, Nue appears as an emissary of Daimaou to deal with Saizou and Seikai during their Shinobi Scroll search by turning them into the lowest hierarchy of Kappa. From there, Nue planned to have the two kill each other so the survivor can become human again. The two overcame their plight and fought Nue with the aid of the Dorodoro to change them back. After killing the Dorodoro and defeating Muteki Shogun, an enlarged Nue battles Ninja Blue and Ninja Yellow as they obtain their Shinobi Scrolls and leave the Youkai buried in the confrontation with their Super Ninja Beasts. However, Nue survived and sent his assassin Gali to handle Jiraiya for him. Once Gali died, Nue resurfaced with the intent to kill Jiraiya personally. However, with Ninja Black gaining God Gammer, Nue is destroyed by the assembled Super Ninja Beasts who attacked with Tsubasamaru supporting them.

Nue is voiced by Tesshō Genda (玄田 哲章, Genda Tesshō).

==== Yamanba ====
Yamanba (ヤマンバ) is the younger sister of Daimaou, Yamanba lived in the mountains with their brother Daidarabotchi where she feeds on lost travelers she while in the guise of an innkeeper named Grandma. When the Kakurangers arrive to their domain after abducting five children that she disguised as chickens, Yamanba attempts to ask Daimaou to join her and Daidarabotchi in killing the ninjas. When Daimaou refuses, Yamanba decides to handle the trap personally. But Ninja Red manages to save the children, with Yamanba forced to retreat to Daimaou after Daidarabotchi's death. Her hatred towards the Kakurangers allows Daimaou to gives her a power boost that transforms her into a more combat-oriented form. In her new form, Yamanba is sent by Daimaou in a scheme to harvest the rage of sadness of people using the soulless Hakumenro in a scheme to put Tsuruhime on the brink of despair. Yamanba and the Flower Kunoichi-Gumi hold the male Kakurangers off, but Jiro and Taro intervene as they take Hakumenro after she enlarged. While Yamanba uses the Youkai energy lightning from the storm to make herself invincible against Ninjaman and the Three God Generals, the Kakurangers' positive emotions dissolve the cloud with Yamanba destroyed by Samuraiman, Super Muteki Shogun, and Kakure Daishogun.

Yamanba is voiced by Haruko Kitahama (北浜 晴子, Kitahama Haruko) while her human form is portrayed by Toshie Kokabu (小甲 登枝恵, Kokabu Toshie).

==== Daidarabotchi ====
Daidarabotchi (ダイダラボッチ) is a giant armored globe-themed Youkai who is the younger brother of Daimaou, upset by his brother disowning him and his sister, who disguised himself as the mountain Yamanba established her inn by. He also poses as the manager of his sister's inn when not needed to be her eyes and ears in the countryside. Daidarabotchi and Yamanba planned to get rid of the Kakurangers one by one by replacing each member with fakes, but Ninja Red managed to use his shadow clones to destroy the fakes before Daidarabotchi surfaced to fight him in God Saruder. Luckily Ninjaman took over before becoming Samuraiman as he, Muteki Shogun, and Super Kakure Daishogun destroy Daidarabotchi.

Daidarabotchi is voiced by Hisao Egawa (江川 央生, Egawa Hisao) while his human form is portrayed by Teruo Shimizu (清水 照夫, Shimizu Teruo).

==== Dorodoro ====
The Dorodoro (ドロドロ) are the lowest form of Youkai who serve mainly as grunts. Though they have warped, kodama-like faces and are clad in light-blue tights, Dorodoro can "mold" themselves into a human form. The Dorodoro have a fear of Nue, as he would not hesitate to kill them if they get out of line with him yet a group of them sacrificed themselves to aid Saizou and Seikai while the two Kakurangers were turned into lesser Youkai like themselves.

==== Minor Youkai ====
The Minor Youkai are the lesser Youkai that serve the members of the Youkai Army Corps while others are independent. Each of them changed their forms by modern times and posed as humans. When the Minor Youkai are defeated in giant-size, their spirits fly into the sky and explode.

===== Independent Youkai =====
The following Youkai acted on their own:

- Kappa (カッパ; 1, 2, 12 & 53): A swimmer-clothed Youkai who is master of Cucumber Bomb and Phantom Space ninpō. Posing a bespectacled man in pilot attire, Kappa tricked Sasuke and Saizou into breaking the Sealing Door so the Youkai can return to power. Though he escaped Muteki Shogun, Kappa's attempt to kill the Kakurangers for making Rokurokubi cry ends with him killed when sliced down the middle by Red Saruder's Saruder Slicer. Kappa was later resurrected by Tengu with a large, curved, silver arm blade in place of his right arm and had metal boots on his feet. He faded once Tengu was killed. Appears during the series' end credits. Voiced by Shoichiro Akaboshi (赤星 昇一郎, Akaboshi Shōichirō), who also portrays his human form.
- Rokurokubi (ロクロクビ; 1, 2 & 53): Kappa's wife whose octopus-like head can detach from her body. Posing as a young woman wearing sunglasses who can extend her neck, Rokurokubi used an arcade building at the Tokyo Amusement Park as a front to make a living. However, she kidnapped Seikai and a youth who reminds her of her long dead son. When the Kakurangers intervene, keeping up with Nekomaru before it eludes her, Rokurokubi's head enlarged to fight Red Saruder while her body battled the other Kakurangers. But when the body was destroyed by Ninja White, Rokurokubi was dying as a result before being destroyed in the explosion brought by Kappa's death. Appears during the series' end credits. Voiced by Keiko Suzuka (鈴鹿 景子, Suzuka Keiko), who also portrays her human form.
- Oboroguruma (オボログルマ; 1, 3, 12 & 53): A ox cart Youkai who evolved into a taxi in modern times with use of the Exhaust Bullet and Honking Flatulence ninpō. Posing as a taxi cab driver, Oboroguruma is one of Azukiarai's flunkies and is motivated to help him due to the abused he suffered from humans over the years. He was chasing a guy for not paying the fare when attacked by the Kakurangers before being saved by Jiraiya and believing there were still humans to respected his kind. But once learning that Jiraiya used him to gain the scrolls, Oboroguruma personally sought to kill him until Jiraiya became Ninja Black. Oboroguruma then decided to destroy the entire city in rage, overpowering Red Saruder until Ninja Black obtained the other scrolls with the Beast Generals destroying Oboroguruma with the Vacuum Hurricane. Oboroguruma was later resurrected by Tengu with a large cannon was mounted onto his back. He faded once Tengu was killed. Appears during the series' end credits. Voiced by Kntarō Don (ドン 貫太郎, Don Kantarō), who also portrays his human form.
- Azukiarai (アズキアライ; 1, 3, 4, 12, 34, 36 & 53): A garbage-based lizard youkai who ends his sentences with "shoki" and is a master of the Illusionary Trash Can, Trash Can Vacuum and Azuki Ball ninpō. With his underlings, Azukiarai sets up his base of operations in the resident police department as its chief after kidnapping the previous one when he was snooping into their affairs. He also took four of the Beast General ninpō scrolls four centuries. When the Kakurangers regain the scrolls, Azukiarai abuses his authority to arrest Seikai for jay walking so he can capture Saizou, Tsuruhime, and Jiraiya when they try to rescue him. While he and his group have a party to celebrate while have their way with their captives, Azukiarai finds Sasuke infiltrated the party to free his friends. Though Azukiarai used the real chief of police as a human shield, the interference of the man's son Shigeru allowed them to defeat Azukiarai. Though he traps them in his trashcan so can burn them with a bonfire, the Beast Generals break free and form Muteki Shogun to finish him off. A replica of Azukiarai with a right forearm cannon was created by Dr. Yugami using Masao as the Youkai Replica's core, ceasing to be once Tengu is destroyed. Appears during the series' end credits. Voiced by Go Awazu (粟津 號, Awazu Gō), who also portrays his human form.
- Nurikabe (ヌリカベ; 1, 5, 6 & 12): A brick wall youkai who posed as a man wearing a varsity jacket and uses the Brick Hurricane and Wall Crush ninpō. Nurikabe plays a maze game with his brother Mokumokuren where they bet on which of the two humans they abduct escape the trap-filled maze first. When Saizou escapes, Nurikabe loses the bet and takes out his frustration on the boy for losing his gold. When Ninja Blue comes to the boy's aid, Nurikabe uses his Brick Tile transformation ninpō to fight the Kakurangers before enlarging with Blue Logan defeating him before destroying the manor. Blue Logan was about to destroy Nurikabe when Mokumokuren intervened. Wanting revenge, Nurikabe targeted Tsuruhime before he is destroyed by the Shark Driver attack. Nurikabe was later resurrected by Tengu with a large mechanical pincer arm in place of his right arm. He faded once Tengu was killed. Appears during the series' end credits. Voiced by Wataru Abe (阿部 渡, Abe Wataru), who also portrays his human form.
- Mokumokuren (モクモクレン; 1, 5, 6, 12 & 53): Nurikabe's younger brother, this youkai posed a young coated man wearing sunglasses. In his true flasher-like form, Mokumokuren has the ability to use genjutsu on humans and various other ninpō through the many eyes on his belly and the interior of his trench coat. He plays a maze game with his brother Nurikabe where they bet on which of the two humans they abduct escape the trap-filled maze first. Though he thanked Saizou for winning with a gold coin, Mokumokuren aided his brother in seeking revenge on the Kakurangers through Tsuruhime. Having fell in love with Tsuruhime, Mokumokuren uses a necklace he and his brother bought under false pretenses to place the kunoichi under his spell to trick her into a legal binding marriage. After a "fixed" Youkai marriage court and Nurikabe's death, Mokumokuren enlarges and is overpowered by White Kark before being destroyed by Muteki Shogun. Mokumokuren was later resurrected by Tengu with a bladed weapon in place of his right hand, fading once Tengu was killed. Appears during the series' end credits. Voiced by Daisuke Tachi (舘 大介, Tachi Daisuke), who also portrays his human form.
- Gakitsuki (ガキツキ; 7, 36 & 53): A hungry ghost youkai with a big mouth and an even bigger appetite. Posing as an overweight aproned man with a second mouth on his belly, his true form wielded a giant knife and fork-like weapons while using the Cha Siu Roll and Soybean Cannon ninpō. While eating at a burger joint, Gakitsuki almost devours Seikai when the others came to his aid. Gakitsuki managed to escape the Shark Drive in the guise of a fly and hid away in Seikai's stomach. From there, Gakitsuki had Seikai start eating large amounts of food in an uncontrollable manner, turning him into a giant fatso before the others learn what happened. After a few failed attempts, the group have to consider learning him behind. However, seeing Seikai in a new light, Tsuruhime assumes the form of a cheeseburger so Seikai can will himself from eating her in order for Gakitsuki to leave him. After being defeated by Ninja White and Ninja Yellow, Gakitsuki enlarges before being destroyed by Muteki Shogun. Voiced by Taisuke Imai (今井 耐介, Imai Taisuke), who also portrays his human form.
- Bakeneko (バケネコ; 8): A buxom white cat youkai in bodybuilding attire who hates humans for their crimes against cats, able to use scratch attacks and Illusion ninpō along with breathing flame and using a katana. Posing as a young woman, Bakeneko set up a pet shop that serves as a front for a Youkai restaurant her customers eat the children she captured with her Kamikakushi ninpō. When the Kakurangers ended up at her manor, Bakeneko attempts to eliminate them after they ate the food she drugged with a paralysis poison. But Sasuke and Tsuruhime saw through it with the former tracking Bakeneko to her restaurant. Though Tsuruhime saved the children, Bakeneko's hold on the children captured the kunoichi while she seemingly killed Ninja Red. After the Kakurangers save their ally from being boiled alive, getting knocked down by Nekomaru, Bakeneko enlarges and battles Red Saruder and White Kark before being destroyed by Muteki Shogun. Voiced by Akiko Kitayama (北山 亜紀子, Kitayama Akiko), who also portrays her human form.
- Hitotsume-kozō Brothers (ヒトツメコゾウ兄弟, Hitotsume Kozō Kyōdai; Movie & 53): These hipster-themed trickster Youkai brothers in 70's clothing, the older in red and the younger in white, terrorize Yumiko and Shigeru in getting rid of the house guardian they have at their house until it drove them out with them nearly getting killed by the Kakurangers. They eventually kidnap Shigeru to force Yumiko into disposing of the guardian to complete Oonyuudou's plan. The two later fight the Kakurangers for Oonynuudou with the older brother killed by the Shark Driver attack. The enraged younger brother enlarges alongside Oonyuudou to avenge his brother with his "giant bowling", only to be killed by Red Saruder's Saru Slicer. Voiced by Kaoru Shinoda (篠田 薫, Shinoda Kaoru) and Hirofumi Ishigaki (石垣 広文, Ishigaki Hirofumi), who also portrays his human form, while the older brother's human form is portrayed by Hideaki Kusaka (日下 秀昭, Kusaka Hideaki).
- Oonyuudou (オオニュウドウ, Ōnyūdō; Movie & 53): A giant Asian elephant youkai who is the loser son of the Youkai Bank's owner. Annoyed with being seen as a loser, Oonyuudou uses his wand to shrink objects and create his "dream town" to rule over. He uses his tuba to place people under his illusions until the Kakurangers' "Lightning Wave" negated this effect. He tries to shrink Muteki Shogun, but it ends up being returned to normal size when he is killed by the Shogun's sword, with everything he shrunk returning to normal. Voiced by Masahiro Anzai (安西 正弘, Anzai Masahiro).
- Dorotabou (ドロタボウ, Dorotabō; 3, 4, Movie & 9): A cauliflower/scarecrow-like fame-driven Youkai whose kind is scarce due to Japan's modernization, master of the Mud Ball and able to fire beams from his eyes. In the guise of the dead beat slob Mr. Dorota, Dorotabou became obsessed with TV. Using a news program to get 15 minutes of fame, Dorotabou ends up picking a fight with Jiraiya and Saizou before falling back. Upon learning that Jiraiya is on Super Battle Quiz, Dorotabou crashes the program and is challenge to a cage match to the death. After losing to Jiraiya in judo, swordsmanship, and boxing, an enraged Dorotabou enlarges. After being pummeled by Black Gammer, Dorotabou is destroyed by Muteki Shogun. Voiced by Akira Matsumura (松村 明, Matsumura Akira), who also portrays his human form.
- Konaki-jiji (コナキジジイ; 10 & 34): A baby-size elderly doll-themed Youkai able to expand his body to a human size one, increase his weight, stretch his arms, and use the Rocky Abyss ninpō. Posing as a gentleman owner of the Neverland store that served as his base of operations, Konaki-jiji assumes an infant form to strangle any adult who gets close enough to steal their souls to bring his dolls to life so he can have a family. In order to intercept Konaki-jiji, Sasuke was drafted to disguised himself as a baby to lure the Youkai. However, Konaki-jiji is not fooled and has Sasuke captured to show him the fruit of his work. However, as others arrive, Sasuke escapes the deathtrap Konaki-jiji prepared for him and defeats the Youkai with the Kakure Shoot. Enlarging, Konaki-jiji is quickly destroyed by Muteki Shogun with the souls returned to their rightful bodies. Voiced by Monsieur Tamura (ムッシュ 田村, Musshu Tamura), who also portrays his human form.
- Shirouneri (シロウネリ; 3, 4, Movie, 11 & 53): A dust cloth Tsukumogami-type Youkai who is master of the Rag Revolt, Rag Conceal, Rag Mattress Roll, and Rag Dancing ninpō. Posing as a tattered-capped man in tacky clothes, Shirouneri lived in an abandoned factory with his rag collection and a magic mirror that he often asked if he is the most fashionable. But when the mirror mentioned that rags are out of season and newer clothes are in, Shirouneri shatters the mirror as he goes prove that everyone else's sense of fashion was wrong. Using his Ninja Art: Rag-a-Morphosis (忍法ぼろヘンゲン, Ninpō Boro Hengen), Shirouneri turned numerous clothes into rags which had no worth to the people who desired them. His abilities expanded to the telekinetic control of any rag and turning his right forearm into a weapon. Shirouneri eventually abducted a girl Seikai fell for who was going to ruin his plan with recycling the rags into new clothes, capturing Seikai as well before the other Kakuranger save them. After being defeated by Kakure Shoot, Shirouneri enlarges before being destroyed by Muteki Shogun. Voiced by Isamu Ichikawa (市川 勇, Ichikawa Isamu), who also portrays his human form.
- Tengu (テング; 12): A long-nosed Youkai who can shooting beams from his eyes and fight with a wind-producing magic fan. Though considered the strongest Youkai, Tengu feels he is being overlooked by his kin and resolves to kill the Kaurangers. To that end, he placed the entire town under his control to use the populace to assist him before sicking the Youkai Replicas on them. When he gets impatient, Tengu enlarges himself and the Youkai Replicas to overwhelm the Beast Generals as he uses Youkai Replicas as shields. However, the Kakurangers summon the Beast General Fighters to even the odds before Muteki Shogun destroys Tengu while slicing his nose off. With Tengu dead, the Youkai Replicas dissolve with the children restored to normal. Voiced by Kazuhiko Kishino (岸野 一彦, Kishino Kazuhiko).
- Kanedama (カネダマ; 13 & 53): A golden toy robot-like Youkai in slot machine-like armor with a magnet arm attachment, he was originally a benevolent Youkai who brings luck to households before becoming evil and greedy. Posing as a gold robed exorcist named Daikichi Fukuō (福王 大吉, Fukuō Daikichi), Kanedama plants the golden coins Prof. Yugami developed into houses to make a profit and fleece the residents of everything they have. However, only the wife of the baker turned him down and Kanedama attempt to force the woman to reconsider by putting up the ante as the Kakurangers help her out. However, due to getting a bump on the back of his head while fighting the Kakurangers, Kanedama's con is exposed as he laced the entire building with his coins before going after Hiroshi with Sasuke saving the baker's son. Though he uses his Thievery Jutsu to take the Kakurangers' Kakulasers from them, he is defeated by Ninja Red using his Full Moon Cut on the Youkai. Kanedama quickly enlarged, with the Beast General Fighters delivering a quick beating to Kanedama before destroying him with Fighter Crush. Once he was destroyed, Kanedama's coins faded and his spell was broken. Voiced by Kaoru Shinoda while his human form is portrayed by Seiroku Saitō (斉藤 清六, Saitō Seiroku).
- Enraenra (エンラエンラ; 22): A smoky gas can Youkai born from car exhaust, able to transform into smoke at will and feed on carbon monoxide. He wields a variety of gases: laughing, tear gas, and numbing gas. In the form of a soda can, Enraenra uses his laughing gas to make the populace laugh before he was discovered by Ninja White as the Kakurangers take him to the train tracks. Though he escaped them, Enraenra is horrified by Nekomaru's added solar panels and smashes them before overwhelming Seikai before resuming his gassing of the city. However, with the aid of Maiko and her brothers, Seikai sucked Enraenra into a vacuum cleaner. Enraenra managed to use the Gigantism youjutsu to escape his prison and overwhelms Muteki Shogun while defeating subjecting him with his gases. Enraenra was about to kill the Kakurangers when Maiko arrives with a machine to freeze the Youkai so the Beast General Fighters can finish him off with the Giant Kakuranger Ball. Voiced by Takuzō Kamiyama (神山 卓三, Kamiyama Takuzō).

===== Gashadokuro's Youkai =====
The following Youkai work for Gashadokuro:

- Keukegen (ケウケゲン; 3-6, Movie, 14, 34 & 53): A witch doctor mask-adorned Bigfoot-like Youkai who is able to infect people with diseased hairballs. He also uses a katana and a pair of scissors as weapons. While entertained his fellow Youkai in outing in the form of dancing, Keukegen assumes the form of a quacked doctor named Kueke (毛羽毛) before the Kakurangers encounter him when they took Seikai to his practice. He is overwhelmed by Beast General Fighters until saved by Gashadokuro. Ending up in Junior's manor, after being beaten up for losing, Keukegen is given an arm-mounted blaster by Prof. Yugami to have an advantage on the Beast General Fighters. Though he traps the Beast Generals and Beast General Fighters to subject them to his Flame Hell (炎地獄, Kaen Jigoku) ninpō, Keukegen is caught off guard by Battle Kumard as Yellow Kumard comes to his team's aid. Transferring from the Beast Generals to the Beast General Fighters, the Kakurangers destroy the Youkai with Fighter Crush. Voiced by Hiroshi Ōkōchi (大河内 浩, Ōkōchi Hiroshi), who also portrays his human form.
- Shuten-douji Brothers (シュテンドウジ兄弟, Shuten-dōji Kyōdai; 15, 16 & 53): A pair of Oni-like Youkai that are heavy sake-drinking masters of the sword, able to fight as a unit with their United Blade fighting style. The elder red brother has two-horns and carries a flask of sake that he uses to breathe fire. The younger blue brother is one-horned. They were both imprisoned for killing 100 Youkai while in drunken stupor, sealed away in an underground dungeon built for the most dangerous Youkai. However, the brothers are released by Junior with the condition to kill the Kakurangers for him. With the Flowery Kunoichi Team luring the Kakurangers into the Wandering Forest and separating them, the Shuten-douji brothers ambush the ninja group. Only Sasuke escaped the trap and managed to free the others before the brothers can turn them into sake. While the others battle the Flowery Kunoichi Team and Dorodoro, Ninja Red counters the Shuten-douji brothers with his shadow clones before using his Full Moon Cut x 8 on them. Upon enlarging, equipped with saw-themed armor created by Prof. Yugami with the elder brother using a drill and the younger a buzzsaw, the Shuten-douji brothers to overwhelm the Beast General Fighters until the elder brother accidentally injuring his younger brother with an attack meant for Battle Saruder. Taking advantage, the Kakurangers form Muteki Shogun to finish the brothers off. Voiced by Takeshi Watabe (渡部 猛, Watabe Takeshi) and Ittoku Yamanaka (山中 一徳, Yamanaka Ittoku).
- Amikiri (アミキリ; 3-6, Movie & 17): A bladed witch-like Youkai under Junior's command who swore to kill Saizou's bloodline for the fact his ancestor chopped her arm off in a duel, having replaced it with the bladed Demon Sword prosthesis provided by Prof. Yugami, which she used by launching the blade on it like a missile. In the form of a beautiful woman with a black gloved prosthetic arm, Amikiri attacked Saizou in their first meeting, cutting his SUV and clothes to pieces but forced to fall back when the other Kakurangers arrive. When Junior kidnaped of a boy named Toru who took picture of her destroying Saizou's SUV, the photos turning out to be poor, Amikiri uses the child to force Saizou into a duel to settle things. Though she overpowers him, Amikiri failed to realize that Toru took more accurate photographs of her fighting style and gave them to the other Kakurangers. Once Ninja Blue is shown the image, he duels Amikiri and defeats her with Square Formation cut. When Amikiri grew, the Kakurangers immediately formed Muteki Shogun to finish off the Youkai with the flaming sword attack. Voiced by Ami Kawai (河合 亜美, Kawai Ami), who also portrays her human form.
- Tsuchigumo (ツチグモ; 19): A spider/mechanic/chain fence-like Youkai under Junior's command who poses as a middle aged mechanic who drives a tow truck. Capable of shooting out spiderwebs from the arms and mouth while moving at a blinding speed, Tsuchigumo abducts his victims in the dark and takes them the abandoned factory to convert into sausages. His actions were witnessed by a boy named Satoru, who told the Kakurangers of him. On Junior's order when the Kakurangers investigate his garage, Tsuchigumo captures Seikai and Satoru to lure the Kakurangers to his lair. As Sasuke manages to elude the trap and deals with Gashadokuro, the others end up in the chamber Tsuchigumo keeps his victims and are overpowered by the Youkai before Seikai breaks free and uses his Triple Slash to defeat the Youkai. Though he enlarged with a wheel-like ring projecting from his back, Tsuchigumo is overpowered by the Beast General Fighters before Muteki Shogun finished him off. Upon his demise, his victims are freed as Gashadokuro escapes. Voiced by Fujio Mori (森 富士夫, Mori Fujio), who also portrays his human form.
- Sarugami (サルガミ; 21 & 36): A wicked monkey spirit under Junior's command, dressed in gangster attire, Sarugami assumes the guise of a ninja master named Daigorō Kasumi (霞 大五郎, Kasumi Daigorō). With Dorodoro posing as his daughter, ill wife and three soccer kids, Sarugami claims his dojo is failing to trick Saizou and the other Kakurangers into showing off their attacks in a demonstration. Once the demonstration ended, Sarugami and his Dorodoro used what they have learned to defeat the Kakurangers. However, learning that they have been played, the Kakurangers trick Sarugami by teaching him an 6-member variation of the Kakuranger Ball that they turn back on him. Enraged by being outwitted, Sarugami enlarges and is destroyed when Battle Logan takes Battle Saruder's place in the Fighter Crush attack. Voiced by Ren Osugi (大杉 漣, Ōsugi Ren), who also portrays his human form.
- Umibouzu (ウミボウズ, Umibōzu; 23 & 53): An arrogant frog/pig/navy-like sea Youkai under Junior, Umibouzu is a powerful Youkai who breathes fire and is armed with a large sword, anchors and depth charges Umibouzu was called to capture five children and petrify them to begin the ritual to resurrect Daimaou. While Junior's music petrifies the other ten needed for the ritual, Umibouzu battles the Kakurangers before enlarging after being defeated by Ninja Red to fight as his full power. Overpowering Muteki Shogun, Umibouzu defeats the Kakurangers and nearly kills them were it not for Tsubasamaru arriving to even the odds it and Muteki Shogun form Super Muteki Shogun to destroy Umibouzu. Voiced by Yoshio Kawai (河合 義雄, Kawai Yoshio).
- Ittan-momen (イッタンモメン; 25 & 36): A biker Youkai hitman who is specialized in strangling via colorful cloths and rides a motorcycle. He is hired by Junior to stop Sasuke from getting his Shinobi Scroll. After mortally injuring Reika, his guide to the scroll, Sasuke took her death personally and was bent on gaining the Shinobi Scroll more than ever. Enlarging to stop Sasuke, Ittan-momen uses his blowtorch and cannon arm attachments to incinerate the countryside to take the ninja out. However, Ninja Red managed to knock down the giant Youkai on his own before getting his Shinobi Scroll. The summoned God Saruder overwhelms Ittanmomen with Super Muteki Shogun's aid before finishing off. Voiced by Nobuyuki Hiyama (檜山 修之, Hiyama Nobuyuki).
- Kasa-bake (カサバケ; 26 & 36): A cycloptic umbrella Tsukumogami-type Youkai with a fish-like face whose kind used to live in rainy weather until the creation of parasols allow him his kind to move in the day. He is sent by Junior to hinder Tsuruhime's quest for her Shinobi Scroll. But once Tsuruhime obtains her scroll from Jiro and Taro after stopping him from grabbing it, Kasa-bake enlarges as he finds himself facing God Kark before being destroyed by Super Muteki Shogun. Voiced by Buntaro Aoyagi (青柳 文太郎, Aoyagi Buntarō).

===== Daimaou's Youkai =====
The following Youkai work for Daimaou:

- Nuppefuhofu (ヌッペフホフ; 32 & 53): A Youkai made of dead flesh who used to live in dark corners and cellars until assuming his current form with his face having a jack-o'-lantern wing casing over it. He uses his long tongue to lick the faces off of people and mounts them in his room for display. Posing as a popsicle man, Nuppefuhofu is sent by Daimaou to steal peoples' faces in the dead of night to cause confusion and chaos. Though he and other Kakurangers attempt to stop him, Nuppefuhofu manages to lick Saizou's face off. However, when he attempts to go after the other Kakurangers, Nuppefuhofu is lured into a trap and is defeated by Ninja Blue. Enlarging in retaliation, Nuppefuhofu is destroyed by Super Kakure Daishogun with his victims regaining their faces. Voiced by Chu Takatsuki (高月 忠, Takatsuki Chū), who also portrays his human form.
- Amanojaku (アマノジャク; 33): A deceptive Oni/mushroom-themed Youkai armed with a halberd, he was trapped under Bishamon statue's club within a mountain temple for his rebellious ways until he tricked Sasuke's young cousin Kosuke into freeing him. Assuming the identity of the temple's head priest, Amanojaku plots his revenge on the residents of the town who mocked him over the centuries with special mushrooms to turn them into Amanojaku like himself. He attracted the Kakurangers' attention when he kicked the temple's cat Tama in the way of Nekomaru, stumbling into Amanojaku's scheme. Chasing after Amanojaku when he abducts Kosuke, Ninja Red defeats the Youkai before destroying him with God Saruder. Voiced by Kiyoyuki Yanada (梁田 清之, Yanada Kiyoyuki) while his human form is portrayed by Rikiya Iwaki (岩城 力也, Iwaki Rikiya).
- Sunakake-babaa (スナカケババァ; 34 & 53): A toad-faced Youkai in a bodycon dress. While her kind were normally tricksters, with the source of their power coming from their breast size, Sunakake-babaa uses the sand in her urn for malicious means like her signature Sand Hell attack. She also attempted to marry various Youkai - including Nurikabe, Keukegen, Azukiarai, and Konaki-jiji - who ended up getting killed off by the Kakurangers before falling in love with Daimaou. In the form of a painted lady, using Saizou as a test to gain the power to turn food into sand, Sunakake-babaa spreads her sand into food to win Daimaou's heart in Operation Leave Everybody Starved at Barren Sand Hell. After being grounded by Nekomaru, Sunakake-babaa counters the Kakurangers' Kakuranger Ball with her Sunakake Ball before taking her leave. However, taking advantage of her before she learns of his true identity, Saizou poses as Daimaou to learn her secret before taking out her bust. Enlarging with her bust restored before her urn got shattered, Sunakake-babaa is destroyed by Kakure Daishogun. Voiced by Akiko Hyuga (日向 明子, Hyūga Akiko), who also portrays her human form.
- Kamaitachi (カマイタチ; 35): A weasel/Aircraft pilot-themed Youkai posing as an elementary school principal, Kamaitachi placed his students under his spell to turn them into Youkai. Alerted to the Kakurangers' presence, Kamaitchi uses the converted students to fight for him. However, having kidnapped their younger sister in the process, Kamaitachi finds himself getting a beat down from Yukiyo and Tsukiyo when they and Tsuruhime reformed the Punishment Sailor Sisters while the other Kakurangers held the Flower Kunoichi off. With Yukiyo and Tsukiyo taking their leave to check on the children, Ninja White finishes the Kamaitachi off before he could enlarge. Voiced by Baiken Jukkanji (十貫寺 梅軒, Jukkanji Baiken), who also portrays his human form.
- Bakuki (バクキ; 36 & 53): A fearsome demonic Baku/shaman Youkai who uses nightmarish illusions in conjunction with his katana, Bakuki is employed by Daimaou to obtain the Jar of Seals that held Ninjaman so that Daimaou could take him into his ranks. But when the Kakurangers intervene, Bakuki kidnaps a young girl named Mitsuko to hold for ransom at Jigoku Valley. Though appearing that he won, Bakuki the Kakurangers get both the jar and Mitsuko with Hakumenro taking out of the Youkai's eyes from afar. Enlarged, Bakuki battles the newly freed Ninjaman in his world of illusions and gets the upper hand until provoking his opponent. Weakened by Samuraiman, Bakuki is destroyed by Super Kakure Daishogun's Iron Fist Flying Finish. Voiced by Takuzō Kamiyama.
- Karakasa (カラカサ; 37 & 53): A Western-style umbrella/race model-themed Youkai who came to help celebrate Daimaou's 1200th birthday through dancing, enlisted by the Youkai leader to capture the Kakurangers so she can serve their livers to him. She tricks two pranksters to get Saizou, Seikai, and Jiraiya into putting on special shoes that subject the wearer to obey her every order. Though unable to save the others, Ninja Red rescue Jiraiya with Ninjaman's help with the group using the shoes to find Karakasa at the site of Daimaou's party. Though it turned out to be trap, the actions of Ninjaman and Hakumenro enable the Kakurangers to escape. Furious as she assumes a fighting form, Karakasa enlarges to fight alongside Daimaou before being abandoned by him prior to her death at the hands of Samuraiman and Kakure Daishogun. Portrayed by Kaori Kusanagi (草薙 かおり, Kusanagi Kaori).
- Ushi-oni (ウシオニ; 38 & 53): A bull-headed Youkai in a gunslinger poncho who uses guns rather than brute strength like his ancestors, calling himself the "Youkai Rifleman". Ushi-oni uses bullets containing his essence to convert those he shoots with rifles into his Ushi-oni Human slaves to steal precious metals to fund the construction of the Onigashima Land amusement park for the Youkai. Despite Jiraiya disarming him in a gunner's duel, Ushi-oni's bovine instincts cause him powers up when he sees Ninja Red's suit and defeats the Kakurangers with his brute strength. However, after Ninjaman uses matador-based fighting style to weaken the Youkai, the Kakurangers defeat Ushi-oni with the Kakuranger Ball. Enlarged and not falling for the matador trick again, Ushi-oni is destroyed by Samuraiman and Kakure Daishogun with his victims returning to normal. Voiced by Masao Imanishi (今西 正男, Imanishi Masao).
- Nopperabou (ノッペラボウ, Nopperabō; 39 & 53): A patchwork clay Youkai who was originally silly and content to scaring humans before becoming the Youkai world's most feared killer, able to reconstruct his body. On Daimaou's orders, Nopperabou is sent to kill the Kakurangers and is seemingly destroyed by the Shark Driver attack. But he gets a power boost from Daimaou in the form of built-in weapons: The arm-mounted Noppera Machine Gun, the concealed-kneecap Noppera Missile, and the shoulder-mounted Noppera Rifle. Luring the Kakurangers in a trap, Nopperabou is defeated by Ninja Red and enlarges prior to be destroyed by a combo attack by Battle Saruder using Saruder Claw, Red Saruder throwing him to the ground, and God Saruder using his Twin Sword Slash. But the Youkai quickly reforms with Ninjaman/Samuraiman joining the fray before he and Super Kakure Daishogun destroys him with a Samurai Rage Bomber/Iron Fist Flying Finish combo. Though he reforms again, Nopperabou finds that his stomach is held back by Samuraiman's foot. Without that one piece, Nopperabou could no longer reform completely and thus simply ceased to be. Voiced by Ryūzaburō Ōtomo (大友 龍三郎, Ōtomo Ryūzaburō).
- Nine-Tailed Kitsune (キュウビノキツネ, Kyūbi no Kitsune; 40): A cunning female fox/model Youkai clad in lingerie whose ancestors wandered China and India. A greedy trickster who assumes the form of an old woman, Nine-Tailed Kitsune wanted to take advantage of Daimaou's return to buy real estate for the Youkai that would eventually move into Tokyo. To that end, tricking children into witnessing a fox wedding, 9-Tailed Kitsune uses her personal fox masked Dorodoro to kidnap the children so she can take their parents for all they have. Disguising herself as Sakurako after having the girl abducted, Kyubi no Kitsune captured Tsuruhime to get the bounty Daimaou placed on the kunoichi. However, expecting the turns of events, Tsuruhime ensured her comrades would find the children while she frees herself. Enraged at being deceived, Nine-Tailed Kitsune uses her illusions and shotgun to overwhelm the Kakurangers before being defeated by the Kakuranger Ball. Despite enlarging herself while brandishing a katana, 9-Tailed Kitsune ends up being destroyed by Samuraiman and Super Kakure Daishogun. Voiced by Hisako Kyōda (京田 尚子, Kyōda Hisako) while her human form is portrayed by Tokie Kanda (神田 時枝, Kanda Tokie).
- Chouchin-kozou (チョウチンコゾウ, Chōchin-kozō; 41 & 53): A giant firebreathing Chinese lantern/hungry ghost-themed Tsukumogami-type Youkai whose ancestors were contend to scare people, having the ability to bring back five spirits who still have lingering attachments to the world. To that end, Chouchin-kozou handpicks five of the most evil ghosts to fulfill their lingering attachments while causing chaos. However, though four meet the Youkai's expectations, the spirit of Shinya Hanada's grandfather took the place of a homicidal ghost. Upon learning it when celebrating prematurely, Chouchin-kozou attempts to send the old man back to the afterlife to rectify his mistake before being forced to personally fight the Kakurangers alongside his ghosts. After seeing Shinya able to fight his own battles, the grandfather no longer has regrets as he becomes a flame that weakens Chouchin-kozou so Ninja Red can defeat him and send his ghosts back. Once enlarged, Chouchin-kozou battles Kakure Daishogun and Samuraiman before being destroyed by Super Kakure Daishogun with his only regret not seeing a line of victory lanterns. Voiced by Shigeru Chiba (千葉 繁, Chiba Shigeru).
- Daradara (ダラダラ; 42-44): A slime-based Youkai created by Daimaou from the contents of an egg he produced from his being as result of his newly gained cloning ability, being essentially an extension of Daimaou's being. Besides producing a deadly ooze that gives humans agonizing deaths, Daradara has the power to suck the power from his opponents and use it as his own, transferring his injuries into his victims. Used in Daimaou's scheme to destroy the Kakurangers and the Three God Generals while draining them of their powers, Daradara siphoned Ninjaman's power to achieve a Ninjaman-like form with his own Daradara Rage Bomber attack while overpowering Super Kakure Daishogun and Muteki Shogun. Though the Three God Generals escape from Daradara siphoning their powers, the Youkai terrorizes the city until Daimaou has him fall back to begin the second phase by siphoning the energies of all the Kakurangers save Sasuke. After enlarging to lure the Three God Generals out by destroying the city while subjecting people to his ooze, Daradara assumes an Asura-like form with the helmets of Ninja White, Yellow, Blue, and Black around his head and a variation of their attacks, such as the Black Bow and Kakuranger Ball. However, Daradara had a glaring weakness that Hakumenro uncovered: That he and Daimaou are spiritually linked. With this knowledge, as the Youkai was fighting the Three God Generals, Sasuke manages to wound Daimaou enough to force Daradara to cancel his siphoning and revert to his original state. From there, attempting to support Daimaou, Daradara is obliterated by Muteki Shogun and Samuraiman's Flaming Shogun Sword and Samurai Rage Bomber combo. Voiced by Yoshimasa Chida.
- Oomukade (オオムカデ, Ōmukade; 45 & 53): A giant centipede Youkai in football player-like attire who speaks some English and posing as Santa Claus. He had attacks like Centipede Punch, Centipede Ball, Centipede Missiles. Also possessing the Elder Santa Claus and stealing Santa's delivery truck, his plan was to give Christmas presents containing his centipedes throughout the world, so that kids who are possessed by the centipedes would move in accordance with his orders and cause chaos in the cities, leaving the Youkai free to dominate the world. Using his Santa disguise, he temporarily managed to trick Ninjaman into trying to delivering his centipede presents with Nekomaru, before the Kakurangers came in with Tsubasamaru and stopped Oomukade with the Kakuranger Ball. Turning into a giant, Oomukade is destroyed by Samuraiman's Samurai Raging Slash & Kakure Daishogun's Iron Fist God Finish attacks respectively. Voiced by Masashi Hirakubo (平久保 雅史, Hirakubo Masashi), who also portrays his human form.
- Mujina (ムジナ; 46 & 53): A shape-shifting badger/artist who assumed the identity of a manga artist, Mujina waited for a longing and isolated manga lover to buy his work, "The Last Kakuranger". Once that opportunity comes, the Kakurangers find themselves in a surreal dimension where they must follow the manga's script where they are killed by Mujina's hands, as he takes on the forms of a merciless swordsman, a Shanghai spy, a spear-wielding master, an Amazoness, and a Los Angeles cop. However, the child Mujina sold the manga to, Akira, foils the scheme with the Kakurangers returning to their world. Joined by Ninjaman, the Kakurangers defeat Mujina's assassins before he enlarges himself and is weakened by Samuraiman as Super Kakure Daishogun lands the deathblow. Voiced by Masahiro Sato (佐藤 正宏, Satō Masahiro), who also portrays his human form.
- Kasha (カシャ; 47 & 53): A pyromaniac youkai in fire chief attire, armed with a giant chakram called the "Flaming Wheel", and two shoulder cannons, whose acts of arson resulted in his capture and imprisonment within the Arctic ice. There, prior to being released from his icy prison, Kasha saw an aurora that inspired him to launching a fireworks display into the winter sky to honor Daimaou. Kasha assumed the guise of a caped man and sought the skill of Ginjiro Karatsu to create a hundred fire words, arranging the destruction of Karatsu's fireworks factory to get the trick the old man into helping him. Kasha also forced Karatsu's granddaughter, Nozomi Karatsu, whose parents in killed in the fire the Youkai started, to dress up as a "Little Match Girl" to help him capture children he needed to place in the fireworks. Sasuke intentionally allowed Kasha to capture him in order to find the Youkai's base, with his teammates swapping out the fireworks that Sasuke and the children were in. After getting defeated by Ninja Red's Lightning Cut, an enlarged Kasha is overwhelmed by Samuraiman before being knocked by Super Kakure Daishogun into an enlarged fireworks launcher and literally going out with a bang. Voiced by Mahito Tsujimura (辻村 真人, Tsujimura Mahito) while his human form is portrayed by Daigaku Sekine (関根 大学, Sekine Daigaku).
- Yuki-onna (ユキオンナ; 48): An ice Youkai whose ancestors used to seduce men with their Fubuki Henshin skills, Yuki-onna employs snow mandala magic in the Youkai cause by using her breath to turn her victims into snowmen for use in a ritual to cause an eternal winter on the world. After getting her first five victims from athletes, Yuki-onna gets her sixth in the police officer Mr. Murata. Despite interference from Jiraiya and the Kakurangers, Yuki-onna gets the "snowman" before learning it is Ninjaman is disguise. Losing her crown before being defeated by Ninja Black, Yuki-onna enlarges and uses her snowmen constructs to freeze Samuraiman and Kakure Daishogun before Muteki Shogun arrives to thaw his allies. As Muteki Shogun and Samuraiman take out the snowmen, Kakure Daishogun destroys Yuki-onna and her spell is undone with her death. Voiced by Yuka Hashimoto (橋本 由香, Hashimoto Yuka), who also portrays her human form.
- Binbogami (ビンボーガミ, Binbōgami; 49 & 53): A clown/dog Youkai who was born from the resentment of a greedy moneylender who lost his fortune during an uprising. To keep with the times, Binbogami gains a power boost as he uses his staff to fire his Change Binbo like his Poor Beam. Binbogami is sent by Daimaou to turn the residents of a town into slaves with the promise to restore their wealth in return for their loyalty. The only civilians who did not fall for his tricks were the Ninomiya family. Though Binbogami had the advantage against the Kakurangers and Ninjaman, they use his past life to break his spell before defeating him the Kakuranger Ball. Binbogami then enlarges before being destroyed by Samuraiman, Muteki Shogun, and Kakure Daishogun. Voiced by Masao Ishiguro (石黒 正男, Ishiguro Masao), who also portrays his human form.
- Onbu-obake (オンブオバケ): A powerful Obariyon/handbag-like ninja Youkai that was sealed in a temple away from the other Youkai by the ancient Kakurangers and appears exclusively in the direct-to-video crossover special Chouriki Sentai Ohranger: Olé vs. Kakuranger. Buldont brought him in for a contest he and his father Bacchus Wrath were having to see who can kill the Ohrangers first. In a duel with Bara Haguruma, he piloted Oh Blocker while Bara Haguruma piloted Ohranger Robo. Onbu-obake could enlarge himself to the size of the Robos without the use of lightning. Onbu-obake was a pervert/rapist and had a fetish for young, pretty girls, whom he could/would abduct to take their souls with a few licks from his extendable tongue. His human guise is a clown and his powers include possession and absorption attacks. He also scared Ganmazin away by showing him his spiritual form. However, the Kakurangers and Ohrangers joining forces places Onbu-obake and Bara Haguruma at a disadvantage. After Buldont and Bacchus made a truce, Onbu-obake envelops Bara Haguruma to form Onbu Haguruma (オンブハグルマ) who endured Oh Blocker's attack but gets destroyed by Tackle Boy after the Ohrangers' mecha use it to make the merged monster dizzy. Voiced by Masahiro Anzai.

== Episodes ==
| No. | Title | Directed by | Written by | Original release date |
|---|---|---|---|---|
| 1 | "We Are Ninja" "Ninja de Gozaru" (忍者でござる) | Yoshiaki Kobayashi | Noboru Sugimura | February 18, 1994 |
| 2 | "A Dangerous Lady" "Abunai Obasan" (危ないオバサン) | Yoshiaki Kobayashi | Noboru Sugimura | February 25, 1994 |
| 3 | "American Ninja" "Amerikan Ninja" (アメリカン忍者) | Taro Sakamoto | Noboru Sugimura | March 4, 1994 |
| 4 | "The Youkai Policeman" "Yōkai Porisuman" (妖怪ポリスマン) | Taro Sakamoto | Noboru Sugimura | March 11, 1994 |
| 5 | "The Uneven Strange Games" "Dekoboko Chin Gēmā" (凸凹珍ゲーマー) | Takeshi Ogasawara | Noboru Sugimura | March 18, 1994 |
| 6 | "The Eyeball Prince!" "Medama no Ōjisama!" (目玉の王子様!) | Takeshi Ogasawara | Noboru Sugimura | March 25, 1994 |
| 7 | "The Huge One" "Koitsa Dekai" (こいつぁデカい) | Katsuya Watanabe | Naruhisa Arakawa | April 1, 1994 |
| 8 | "The Bakeneko's Shop!!" "Bakeneko Shoppu!!" (化猫ショップ!!) | Katsuya Watanabe | Susumu Takaku | April 8, 1994 |
| 9 | "Hidden Camera Live" "Dokkiri Namachūkei" (ドッキリ生中継) | Taro Sakamoto | Noboru Sugimura | April 15, 1994 |
| 10 | "Konakijiji: A Cry-Baby Goblin" "Konakijiji ja" (子泣き爺いぢゃ) | Taro Sakamoto | Susumu Takaku | April 22, 1994 |
| 11 | "Rags are the Best!!" "Boro Koso Saikō!" (ボロこそ最高!!) | Takeshi Ogasawara | Susumu Takaku | April 29, 1994 |
| 12 | "They Came Forth!! New Beast Generals" "Detaa!! Shin Jūshō" (出たァ!! 新獣将) | Takeshi Ogasawara | Noboru Sugimura | May 6, 1994 |
| 13 | "Fight Off The Bad Luck" "Buttobase Fukō" (ブッとばせ不幸) | Shohei Tojo | Hirohisa Soda | May 13, 1994 |
| 14 | "I'm the Young Noble!!" "Ore wa Kikōshi da!!" (俺は貴公子だ!!) | Shohei Tojo | Noboru Sugimura | May 20, 1994 |
| 15 | "Argh!! Awesome Guys" "Gē!! Sugoi Yatsu" (げえッ!! 凄い奴) | Taro Sakamoto | Noboru Sugimura | May 27, 1994 |
| 16 | "The Red Monkey's Oni Extermination" "Aka-zaru no Oni Taiji" (赤猿の鬼退治) | Taro Sakamoto | Noboru Sugimura | June 3, 1994 |
| 17 | "The Demon Sword and Underwear" "Maken to Pantsu!!" (魔剣とパンツ!!) | Katsuya Watanabe | Hirohisa Soda | June 10, 1994 |
| 18 | "Hello, Mushroom-kun" "Harō Kinoko-kun" (ハローきのこ君) | Katsuya Watanabe | Noboru Sugimura | June 17, 1994 |
| 19 | "The Hellish Trap in Darkness!!" "Kurayami no Jigoku Wana!!" (暗闇の地獄罠!!) | Takeshi Ogasawara | Noboru Sugimura | June 24, 1994 |
| 20 | "The Flowery Kunoichi-Gumi!!" "Hana no Kunoichi Gumi" (花のくノ一組!!) | Takeshi Ogasawara | Noboru Sugimura | July 1, 1994 |
| 21 | "Monkey See, Monkey Does Finishing Move" "Saru Mane Hissatsu-waza" (サルマネ必殺技) | Shohei Tojo | Hirohisa Soda | July 8, 1994 |
| 22 | "I'll Make You Laugh" "Waratte Itadakimasu" (笑って頂きます) | Shohei Tojo | Hirohisa Soda | July 15, 1994 |
| 23 | "Blitzkrieg!! The Strange White Bird" "Dengeki!! Shiroi Kaichō" (電撃!! 白い怪鳥) | Katsuya Watanabe | Noboru Sugimura | July 22, 1994 |
| 24 | "Ah, It's All Over" "Aa Ikkan no Owari" (あァ一巻の終り) | Katsuya Watanabe | Noboru Sugimura | July 29, 1994 |
| 25 | "A New Departure" "Aratanaru Tabidachi!!" (新たなる出発(たびだち)!!) | Taro Sakamoto | Noboru Sugimura | August 5, 1994 |
| 26 | "The Tsuruhime Family's Super Secret" "Tsuruhime-ke no Chō Himitsu" (鶴姫家の超秘密) | Taro Sakamoto | Noboru Sugimura | August 12, 1994 |
| 27 | "The End of the Mighty Shogun" "Muteki Shōgun no Saigo" (無敵将軍の最期) | Shohei Tojo | Hirohisa Soda | August 19, 1994 |
| 28 | "A Super Big Figure Coming to Japan!!" "Chō Ōmono – Rainichi!!" (超大物・来日!!) | Shohei Tojo | Noboru Sugimura | August 26, 1994 |
| 29 | "History's First Super Battle" "Shijō Hatsu no Sūpā Batoru" (史上初の超対決(スーパーバトル)) | Shohei Tojo | Noboru Sugimura | September 2, 1994 |
| 30 | "Reunion With a Traitorous Father" "Saikai Uragiri no Chichi" (再会 裏切りの父) | Takeshi Ogasawara | Noboru Sugimura | September 9, 1994 |
| 31 | "Behold!! A New Shogun" "Mita ka!! Shin Shōgun" (見たか!! 新将軍) | Takeshi Ogasawara | Noboru Sugimura | September 16, 1994 |
| 32 | "Don't Lick Me, Face Thief" "Namen na Kao Dorobō" (ナメんな顔泥棒) | Katsuya Watanabe | Susumu Takaku | September 23, 1994 |
| 33 | "The Village Of Amanojaku" "Amanojaku Mura" (あまのじゃく村) | Hiroshi Butsuda | Kunio Fujii | September 30, 1994 |
| 34 | "The Bride's Sandy Hell!!" "Hanayome Suna Jigoku!!" (花嫁砂地獄!!) | Hiroshi Butsuda | Hirohisa Soda | October 7, 1994 |
| 35 | "The Three Punishment Sisters" "Oshioki San Shisutāzu" (おしおき三姉妹(シスターズ)) | Katsuya Watanabe | Naruhisa Arakawa | October 14, 1994 |
| 36 | "The Hooligan Ninja!!" "Abarenbō Ninja!!" (暴れん坊忍者!!) | Katsuya Watanabe | Noboru Sugimura | October 21, 1994 |
| 37 | "Karakasa Dance Queen" "Karakasa Dansu Kuīn" (唐傘ダンス女王(クイーン)) | Taro Sakamoto | Noboru Sugimura | October 28, 1994 |
| 38 | "Mooo... A Repulsive Cow" "Moo~- Iya na Ushi" (モオ～ッ嫌な牛) | Taro Sakamoto | Hirohisa Soda | November 4, 1994 |
| 39 | "It's a Special Compilation!!" "Tokubetsu Hen Dayo!!" (特別編だよっ!!) | Shohei Tojo | Noboru Sugimura | November 11, 1994 |
| 40 | "The Heisei Fox Battle" "Heisei Kitsune-gassen" (平成キツネ合戦) | Shohei Tojo | Susumu Takaku | November 18, 1994 |
| 41 | "The Stray Ghost" "Hagure Gōsuto" (はぐれゴースト) | Takeshi Ogasawara | Hirohisa Soda | November 25, 1994 |
| 42 | "The Plundered Ninja Power" "Gōdatsu Ninja Pawā" (強奪忍者パワー) | Takeshi Ogasawara | Noboru Sugimura | December 2, 1994 |
| 43 | "The Last Day of the Three God Generals" "Sanshinshō Saigo no Hi" (三神将最期の日) | Katsuya Watanabe | Noboru Sugimura | December 9, 1994 |
| 44 | "The Wound-Filled Great Reversal" "Kizu Darake Dai Gyakuten" (傷だらけ大逆転) | Katsuya Watanabe | Noboru Sugimura | December 16, 1994 |
| 45 | "The Hasty Santa" "Awatenbō Santa" (慌てん坊サンタ) | Yoshiaki Kobayashi | Hirohisa Soda | December 23, 1994 |
| 46 | "The New Year's Manga Hell" "Shinshun Manga Jigoku" (新春まんが地獄) | Yoshiaki Kobayashi | Hirohisa Soda | January 6, 1995 |
| 47 | "The 100-Burst Human Fireworks" "Ningen Hanabi Hyaku Renpatsu" (人間花火百連発) | Takeshi Ogasawara | Susumu Takaku | January 13, 1995 |
| 48 | "The Great Snow Woman's Snowball Fight" "Ō Yukionna no Yukigassen" (大雪女の雪合戦) | Takeshi Ogasawara | Hirohisa Soda | January 20, 1995 |
| 49 | "Suddenly!! Poor" "Totsuzen!! Binbō" (突然!! ビンボー) | Katsuya Watanabe | Hirohisa Soda | January 27, 1995 |
| 50 | "Special Selection!! The Youkai Inn" "Tokusen!! Yōkai no Yado" (特選!! 妖怪の宿) | Katsuya Watanabe | Noboru Sugimura | February 3, 1995 |
| 51 | "Hero Elimination" "Hīrō Shikkaku" (英・雄(ヒーロー)・失・格) | Katsuya Watanabe | Noboru Sugimura | February 10, 1995 |
| 52 | "Finale!! Father and Daughter" "Daidan'en!! Chichi to Ko" (大団円!! 父と娘(こ)) | Taro Sakamoto | Noboru Sugimura | February 17, 1995 |
| 53 (Final) | "Sealing!!" "Fūin!!" (封印!!) | Taro Sakamoto | Noboru Sugimura | February 24, 1995 |

== Movie ==
The movie version of Ninja Sentai Kakuranger, directed by Shōhei Tōjō and written by Noboru Sugimura, premiered in Japan on April 16, 1994, at Toei Super Hero Fair '94. It was originally shown as a triple feature alongside Kamen Rider J and the feature film version of Blue SWAT. The villains in the movie consisted of the Hitotsume-kozō Brothers and Oonyuudou. The movie was filmed between episodes 7 and 8, but is actually set between episodes 8 and 9.

== Crossovers ==
The Kakuranger team was the main focus in the 1994 3D featurette Super Sentai World, which features them teaming up with the four previous Super Sentai teams (Fiveman, Jetman, Zyuranger, and Dairanger).

A second crossover film was released in the form of Chouriki Sentai Ohranger: Olé vs. Kakuranger (超力戦隊オーレンジャー オーレVSカクレンジャー, Chōriki Sentai Ōrenjā Ōre Tai Kakurenjā), a 1996 direct-to-video movie which features the Kakurangers working together with the Ohrangers to defeat a common adversary.

== Special ==
Ninja Sentai Kakuranger: Act Three - Middle-Aged Struggles (忍者戦隊カクレンジャー 第三部・中年奮闘編, Ninja Sentai Kakurenjā Dai-san-bu Chūnen Funtō-hen) is a web-exclusive special released on Toei Tokusatsu Fan Club on August 4, 2024, to commemorate the 30th anniversary of the conclusion of the series. Mrs. Green Apple frontman Motoki Ohmori appeared as a special guest. In the ending sequence, Nao Nagasawa, Kōhei Yamamoto, and Hideya Tawada reprised their respective roles as Nanami Nono and Kota Bito from Ninpuu Sentai Hurricaneger and Kinji Takigawa from Shuriken Sentai Ninninger.

== Cast ==
- Sasuke: Teruaki Ogawa (小川 輝晃, Ogawa Teruaki)
- Tsuruhime: Satomi Hirose (広瀬 仁美, Hirose Satomi)
- Saizou: Hiroshi Tsuchida (土田 大, Tsuchida Hiroshi)
- Seikai: Shu Kawai (河合 秀, Kawai Shū)
- Jiraiya: Kane Kosugi (ケイン・コスギ, Kein Kosugi)
- Hakumenro: Takayuki Godai (五代 高之, Godai Takayuki)
- Sandayu Momochi: Akira Sakamoto (坂本 あきら, Sakamoto Akira)
- Junior: Kenichi Endō (遠藤 憲一, Endō Ken'ichi)
- Dr. Yugami: Noboru Akima (秋間 登, Akima Noboru)
- Ayame (アヤメ): Maho Suzuki (鈴木 真帆, Suzuki Maho; 15–20), Miki Ikuma (生間 美紀, Ikuma Miki; 35–53)
- Sakura (サクラ): Keiko Hayase (早瀬 恵子, Hayase Keiko)
- Suiren (スイレン): Junko Honda (本田 順子, Honda Junko)
- Yuri (ユリ): Ritsuko Noguchi (野口 律子, Noguchi Ritsuko)
- Ran (ラン): Chie Tanabe (田邊 智恵, Tanabe Chie)
- Kōshakushi: Sanyūtei Enjō (三遊亭 圓丈), Kanda Hakuzan (神田 伯山; Act Three - Middle-Aged Struggles)

=== Voice cast ===
- Ninjaman: Kazuki Yao (矢尾 一樹, Yao Kazuki)
- Muteki Shogun (無敵将軍, Muteki Shōgun): Tomoyuki Horita (堀田智之, Horita Tomoyuki)
- Kakure Daishogun (隠大将軍, Kakure Daishōgun), Tsubasamaru (ツバサマル): Dai Matsumoto (松本 大, Matsumoto Dai)
- Daimaou: Hidekatsu Shibata (柴田 秀勝, Shibata Hidekatsu)

== Songs ==
Opening theme

- "Secret Kakuranger" (シークレット カクレンジャー, Shīkuretto Kakurenjā)
  - Lyrics: Kayoko Fuyumori (冬杜 花代子, Fuyumori Kayoko)
  - Composition: Takashi Tsushimi (都志見 隆, Tsushimi Takeshi)
  - Arrangement: Kenji Yamamoto (山本 健司, Yamamoto Kenji)
  - Artist: Tu Chee Chen (トゥー・チー・チェン, Tū Chī Chen)
  Takashi Tsushimi performed under the name "Tu Chee Chen", which is the Japanese approximation of his surname as read in Mandarin Chinese: Dōu Zhì Jiàn.

Ending theme

- "Ninja! Matenrō Kids" (ニンジャ！摩天楼キッズ, Ninja! Mantenrō Kizzu; "Ninja! Skyscraper Kids")
  - Lyrics: Hanadaiko Fuyamori
  - Composition: Takeshi Tsushimi
  - Arrangement: Kenji Yamamoto
  - Artist: Tu Chee Chen
