= Revenge of the Ninja =

1983 film directed by Sam Firstenberg

- Theatrical release poster
- Directed by: Sam Firstenberg
- Written by: James R. Silke
- Produced by: Menahem Golan; Yoram Globus
- Starring: Sho Kosugi; Keith Vitali; Virgil Frye; Arthur Roberts; Ashley Ferrare; Mario Gallo; Kane Kosugi
- Cinematography: David Gurfinkel
- Edited by: Mark Helfrich
- Music by: Robert J. Walsh
- Production company: Cannon Films
- Distributed by: MGM/UA Entertainment Co.
- Release date: September 7, 1983
- Running time: 90 minutes
- Country: United States
- Language: English
- Budget: $700,000
- Box office: $14 million (est.)

Revenge of the Ninja is a 1983 American martial arts action film directed by Sam Firstenberg and starring Sho Kosugi, Keith Vitali, Virgil Frye, Arthur Roberts and Kane Kosugi in his film debut. The plot follows a ninja trying to protect his only son from a cabal of ruthless gangsters.

It is the second installment in Cannon Films' "Ninja Trilogy" anthology series, starting with Enter the Ninja (1981) and ending with Ninja III: The Domination (1984). It was very successful at the box office, despite receiving mixed reviews from critics, and has developed a cult following.

== Plot ==
In Japan, the home of Cho Osaki is attacked by an army of a rival ninja clan, resulting in the slaughter of his entire family except for his mother and his younger son, Kane. When Cho arrives at his estate and discovers the carnage, the ninjas attempt to kill him as well, but Cho, a highly skilled ninja himself, avenges his family and kills the attacking ninjas. Afterwards, however, he swears off being a ninja forever and moves with his son and mother to America, where he opens an Oriental art gallery with the help of his American business partner and friend, Braden, and his assistant Cathy.

One night, Kane accidentally drops and breaks open one of the dolls, exposing a white dust (which is in actuality, heroin) contained therein. As it turns out, Braden uses the doll gallery as a front for his drug-smuggling business. He tries to strike a deal with Caifano, a mob boss, but Caifano and Braden cannot find common ground and eventually engage in a turf war. Braden, as a silver "demon"-masked ninja, assassinates Caifano's informers and relatives to make him cower down. The police are confused about the killings, and local police martial arts trainer and expert, Dave Hatcher, is assigned to find a consultant. Dave persuades his friend Cho to see his boss, and Cho attests that only a ninja could commit these crimes, but refuses to aid the police any further.

In order to avoid payment for his 'merchandise', Caifano sends four men to rob the gallery. Cho walks into the gallery while the thugs are loading the goods in a van, is attacked and responds with hand-to-hand combat. The henchmen escape in the van with Cho in pursuit, but he fails to stop the thieves from getting away. Meanwhile, Braden stealthily arrives at Cho's art gallery to find it looted. Cho's mother and Kane both encounter him; Braden kills Cho's mother, but Kane manages to elude him. Cho, badly mangled, returns to find his mother murdered and his son missing.

In order to finish the last witness, Braden hypnotizes Cathy, who is in love with Cho, to find and bring in Kane. When she recovers her senses, she contacts Cho and informs him both of Braden's treachery and that he is a ninja. Seeing his only remaining son in mortal danger, Cho breaks his vow of non-violence and makes his way to Caifano's headquarters to stop Braden. In the meantime, Braden finds out about Cathy's betrayal and prepares to have her executed. Kane frees himself and Cathy, and the two inform the authorities.

Braden makes his final assault on Caifano and his organization, killing all he encounters. Eager to help Cho, Dave also rushes to Caifano's headquarters but is ambushed by Braden, who mortally wounds him. Cho rushes to help his faithful friend, but the latter dies in his arms. Braden and Cho duel to the death on top of Caifano's skyscraper. After a long fight, Cho kills Braden and is reunited with his son and Cathy as the film draws to a close.

== Cast ==
- Sho Kosugi as Cho Osaki
- Keith Vitali as Dave Hatcher
- Virgil Frye as Lieutenant Dime
- Arthur Roberts as Braden
- Mario Gallo as Caifano
- Kane Kosugi as Kane Osaki
- Grace Oshita as Grandmother
- Ashley Ferrare as Cathy
- John LaMotta as Joe
- Don Shanks as Chief
- Professor Toru Tanaka as Sumo servant
- Joe Pagliuso as Alberto
- Mel Hampton as Detective Rios
- Oscar Rowland as One-eyed informant
- Alan Amiel as Red ninja leader
- Shane Kosugi as Cho's first son

== Production ==
Revenge of the Ninja was originally intended to be shot in Los Angeles, but the necessary permits, police protection, fire marshals and myriad logistics fees threatened to take up a bigger and bigger part of the film's budget. The Utah Film Commission was trying to get Cannon Films to start producing films in their state and a representative promised no permits, location fees or union deals as well as lower salaries for local crews. The commission's assurances persuaded Cannon to switch filming to Salt Lake City.

Arthur Roberts (Braden) was not a trained martial artist, so for the majority of his scenes as the Demon Ninja, he was doubled by the film's stunt coordinator Steven Lambert. The final rooftop fight scene between Sho Kosugi and Roberts/Lambert took two weeks to film. This was due to the required pyrotechnics, mechanical rigging, safety considerations, elaborate camera positioning (including hanging 20 stories high outside the building), and helicopter shots.

The film was the acting debut of 8-year-old Kane Kosugi, the son of star Sho Kosugi.

== Release ==
The film was theatrically released by MGM/UA Communications Co. on September 7, 1983.

=== Home media ===
The film was released on Blu-ray in Australia in June 2017. A Blu-Ray was released in the United States by Kino Lorber in May 2024.

== Reception ==
=== Box office ===
The film made $13,168,027 domestically in the United States, equivalent to $38,800,130 adjusted for inflation in 2021.

In Germany, it sold 333,182 tickets in 1984, equivalent to an estimated €832,955 ($657,201) in gross revenue. In France, it sold 32,200 tickets in 1984, equivalent to an estimated €86,940 ($68,596). This adds up to an estimated total of approximately $14 million grossed worldwide.

In terms of box office admissions, it sold 4.2 million tickets in the United States, 32,200 tickets in France, and 333,182 tickets in Germany, for a combined 4,565,382 tickets sold worldwide.

=== Critical response ===
Rotten Tomatoes lists three reviews, so no aggregate rating is given on the site; two reviews are positive and one negative. On Metacritic, the film has a weighted average score of 32 out of 100, based on 5 critics, indicating "generally unfavorable reviews".

The film became a cult hit due to its elaborate martial arts sequences and B-movie production values. Variety gave it a generally favorable review, calling it "an entertaining martial arts actioner" and praising the "fight choreography by Kosugi", despite lacking the "name players and Far East locale" of Enter the Ninja.

== Sequel ==
A sequel, Ninja III: The Domination, was released in 1984. Sam Firstenberg returned as director. The film is narratively unrelated to Revenge of the Ninja, with Sho Kosugi playing a different character.

== See also ==
- List of American films of 1983
- List of martial arts films
- List of ninja films
