= Sho Kosugi =

Japanese actor (born 1948)

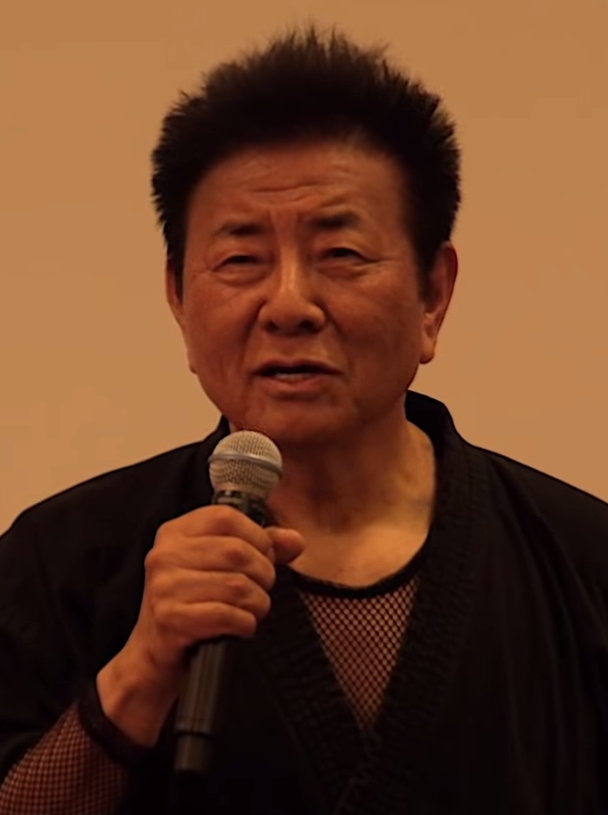
- Sho Kosugi in 2018
- Born: 小杉 正一 (Shōichi Kosugi); June 17, 1948 (age 78); Minato, Tokyo, Japan
- Occupations: Actor, martial artist, writer
- Years active: 1974–present
- Spouse: Shook Gim Chan (m. 1973; div. 2009)
- Children: Kane Kosugi, Shane Kosugi, Ayeesha Kosugi

Sho Kosugi (ショー・コスギ, Shō Kosugi; born Shōichi Kosugi (小杉 正一, Kosugi Shōichi) on June 17, 1948) is a Japanese actor, martial artist and writer with extensive training in Shindō jinen-ryū Karate, Kendo, Judo, Iaido, Kobudo, Aikido and Ninjutsu. A former All Japan Karate Champion, he gained popularity as an actor during the 1980s, often playing ninjas. He starred in a trilogy of martial arts ninja films produced by Cannon Films (Enter the Ninja, Revenge of the Ninja and Ninja III: The Domination), before starring in the primetime television series The Master. His work helped establish ninjas in popular culture, leading to a "ninja boom" or "ninjamania" during the early-to-mid-1980s.

== Life and career ==
At the age of 19, Kosugi left Japan to study and reside in Los Angeles where he earned a bachelor's degree in Economics at CSULA. At the same time, he consistently improved his martial arts skills while learning a wide variety of styles, such as Chinese xingyiquan, Korean taekwondo and Japanese Shitō-ryū and Shotokan-ryū karate.

He is the father of Kane Kosugi and Shane Kosugi, who are both actors and martial artists, and Ayeesha Kosugi, a former senior member of the women's golf team at the University of Nevada-Las Vegas. In Japan, he also ran an internationally oriented group of martial arts acting schools known as the Sho Kosugi Institute. He currently resides in Los Angeles. Films in which Kosugi's sons perform alongside their father include Revenge of the Ninja, Pray for Death, Black Eagle and Journey of Honor (A.K.A. Kabuto, Shogun Mayeda and Shogun Warrior).

In 2009, Sho made a comeback to films playing the lead villain of Ozunu in the action thriller Ninja Assassin opposite K-pop star and actor Rain.

== Filmography ==
=== Films ===
Year	Title	Role	Notes
1974	The Godfather: Part II	Passerby	Extra
1975	Six Killers		
1976	Bruce Lee Fights Back from the Grave (아메리카 訪問客)	Suzuki	
1978	The Bad News Bears Go to Japan	Kata demonstrator	Extra
1981	Enter the Ninja	Hasegawa	
1983	Revenge of the Ninja	Cho Osaki	Fight choreographer
1984	Ninja III: The Domination	Goro Yamada	Fight choreographer
1985	9 Deaths of the Ninja	Spike Shinobi	Fight choreographer
1985	Pray for Death	Akira Saito	Martial arts choreographer
1987	Rage of Honor	Shiro Tanaka	Martial arts choreographer
1988	Aloha Summer	Yukinaga Konishi	Special kendo choreographer
1988	Black Eagle	Ken Tani	Fight choreographer
1989	Blind Fury	The Assassin	Sword duel choreographer
1991	Journey of Honor (兜 KABUTO)	Daigorō Mayeda	Producer; Story
1993	Drug Connection (極東黒社会)	Larry Matsuda	
1994	The Fighting King (ザ・格闘王)		Director
1994	The Fighting King 2 (ザ・格闘王2)		Director
2002	The Scorpion King		Taiko choreographer Writer of "Marching-In" theme
2009	Ninja Assassin	Ozunu	

=== Television ===
Year	Title	Role	Notes
1977	The Richard Pryor Show	Samurai	Extra
1984	The Master	Okasa	13 episodes Also fight double, stunt coordinator, ninja choreographer and technical advisor
1986	Honda Hurricane	Ninja	TV commercial: "Hiding Ninja"
1987	Wide Show 11 PM (11PM)	Himself	Episode: "USA Latest Information! Ninja Boom, Landing in Japan! $1 Million Star Sho Kosugi Visit!!"
1991	Subarashiki Nakama (すばらしき仲間)	Himself	1 episode
1991	42nd NHK Kōhaku Uta Gassen (第42回NHK紅白歌合戦)	Himself	TV special
1992	Super Jockey (スーパージョッキー)	Himself	1 episode
1993	Dragon Spirit (琉球の風)	Shintenpū	10 episodes
1993	Itsumitemo Haranbanjō (いつみても波瀾万丈)	Himself	1 episode
1993	Ultraman: The Ultimate Hero (ウルトラマンパワード)	Ultraman (voice)	Episode: "On a Mission from M78" (Japanese dub)
1994	Sanma no Nandemo Derby (さんまのなんでもダービー)	Himself	1 episode
1994	Waratte Iitomo! Tokudaigō (笑っていいとも!特大号)	Himself	1 episode
1994	Oltre i Cinquanta (オルトレ・イ・チンクワンタ)	Himself	1 episode
1994	Tetsuko's Room (徹子の部屋)	Himself	1 episode
1994	Ninja Sentai Kakuranger (忍者戦隊カクレンジャー)	Gali	Episodes: "A Super Big Figure Coming to Japan!!", "History's First Super Battle"
1995	Friday Lively Time (金曜いきいきタイム)	Himself	1 episode
1996–1998	Sho Kosugi Self-Defense and Ninjaerobics	Himself	Producer; Instructor
1996	Bang! Bang! Bang! (BANG! BANG! BANG!)	Himself	1 episode
1996	Legend of St. Dragon (聖龍伝説)	Shūsaku Sendō	Episode: "Episode 7"
1997	Cooking Banzai! (料理バンザイ!)	Himself	1 episode
1999	Madamunmun (マダムんむん)	Himself	1 episode
2000	Pro Sportsman No. 1 (スポーツマンNo. 1決定戦)	Himself	TV special: "Celebrity Survival Battle XVI"
2000	Muscle Elite (筋肉精鋭)	Himself	3 episodes
2000	Tunnels no Namade Daradara ika sete!! (とんねるずの生でダラダラいかせて!!)	Himself	1 episode
2000–2003	Sōzetsu batoru! Hana no geinōkai (壮絶バトル!花の芸能界)	Himself	3 episodes
2000	Romihii (ろみひー)	Himself	1 episode
2000	Still, I like Japan! (土曜特集 それでも,ニッポンが好き!)	Himself	1 episode
2001	Kagai Jugyō Yōkoso Senpai (課外授業 ようこそ先輩)	Himself	Episode "Hollywood Star: The Way To Realize Your Dreams"
2001	Tiger's Gate (虎ノ門)	Himself	1 episode
2001	Kanbai Gekijō (完売劇場)	Himself	2 episodes
2001	Channepu (ちゃんネプ)	Himself	1 episode
2001	Warau Inu (笑う犬の発見 Go with flow!)	Himself	1 episode
2002	Muscle Battle Preview Special (筋肉バトル直前特集)	Himself	1 episode
2002	Sunday Big Variety (日曜ビッグバラエティ)	Himself	Episode "Famous Foreign Talent: Homecoming Trip"
2002	Super Friday (スーパーフライデー)	Himself	2 episodes
2003	Aitai! Onegai Kamisama Mōichido Dake! Special (逢いたい！お願い神様もう一度だけ！SP)	Himself	1 episode
2003	Quiz $ Millionaire (クイズ$ミリオネア)	Himself	1 episode
2003	Tokumitsu Kazuo no Jōhō Spirits (徳光和夫の情報スピリッツ)	Himself	1 episode
2005	Zenigata Kintaro (銭形金太郎)	Himself	1 episode
2005–2007	Seikatsu Hot Morning (生活ほっとモーニング)	Himself	2 episodes
2006	Barber Young (バーばーヤング)	Himself	1 episode
2006–2007	Anytime Anywhere! Sho Kosugi's Towel Exercise (いつでもどこでも!ショー・コスギのタオルエクササイズ)	Himself	
2007	Zubari Iuwayo! (ズバリ言うわよ！)	Himself	3 episodes

=== Home videos ===
Year	Title	Role	Notes
1985	Master Class	Himself/Ninja	Fight choreographer
1986	Ninja Theater Hosted by Sho Kosugi	Himself/Ninja	13 segments Fight choreographer
2000	SKI (Sho Kosugi Institute)	Himself	Producer
2008	Sho Kosugi's Let's Towelcise (Note: Sho Kosugi's Let's Towelcise is a follow-up to Anytime Anywhere! Sho Kosugi's Towel Exercise.)	Himself/Ninja	
2017	The Art of Hollywood Ninja Action Film Making	Himself/Ninja	Director; Producer

=== Stage ===
Year	Title	Roles	Notes
2001	The Ninjas From Hollywood Japan Tour 2001	Genbusui, God of War and Peace; Kojiro, NY Ninja Boss; Bird-masked Ninja	Director; Producer; Writer
2002	The Ninjas From Hollywood Japan Tour 2002	Genbusui, God of War and Peace; Kojiro, NY Ninja Boss; Prior Generation Ninja Leader	Director; Producer; Writer

=== Video games ===
Year	Title	Role	Notes
1998	Tenchu: Stealth Assassins	Rikimaru	motion capture

== Bibliography ==
=== Non-Fiction ===
Authors	Year	Title	Publisher	ISBN	Notes
Kosugi, Sho	1990	Sho Kosugi: American Dream o Jitsugen Shita Otoko (ショー・コスギ アメリカンドリームを実現した男)	Nittō Shoin Honsha	978-4-5280003-5-3	Autobiographical
Kosugi, Sho	1993	American Survival (アメリカンサバイバル)	Kodansha	978-4-0620627-7-0	
Kosugi, Sho	1994	Sho Kosugi no Un o Tsukamu (ショー・コスギの運を掴む)	Kodansha	978-4-0620714-0-6	
Hirao, Yukari; Nemoto, Tetsuya	1996	Sho Kosugi: The Challenge of Hollywood (ショー・コスギ ハリウッドの挑戦)	Business-sha	978-4-8284067-6-3	Biographical manga
Kosugi, Sho	1996	Sho Kosugi no Ninja Shiki Jinsei Hissho Ho (ショー・コスギのニンジャ式人生必勝法)	Bungeisha	978-4-8873700-0-5	
Kosugi, Sho	1997	Make Dreams Come True (メイク・ドリームズ・カム・トゥルー)	Uinet	978-4-8728450-0-6	
Kosugi, Sho	1998	Boku no Eigo Musha Shugyo: Atama wa Iranai! Eikaiwa (ぼくの英語武者修行 頭はいらない！英会話)	Kodansha	978-4-0626369-3-3	
Kosugi, Sho	2000	Saikyo no Otoko Kane Kosugi ni Naru 43 no Hisaku (最強の男ケイン・コスギになる43の秘策)	Kodansha	978-4-0621032-7-5	
Kosugi, Sho	2000	Hollywood Cinema Eigo Dojo: Doryoku wa Iranai! Eikaiwa (ハリウッド・シネマ英語道場 努力はいらない！英会話)	Kodansha	978-4-0626480-5-9	
Kosugi, Sho	2001	Kodomo o Takumashiku Sodateru Honmono no Shitsuke: How to raise a child (子供をたくましく育てる本物の「躾」 How to raise a child)	Business-sha	978-4-8284093-9-9	
Kosugi, Sho	2006	NHK Marutoku Magazine: Anytime Anywhere! Sho Kosugi's Towel Exercise (NHKまる得マガジン いつでもどこでも！ショ－・コスギのタオルエクササイズ)	NHK Publishing	978-4-14-827154-6	

=== Fiction ===
Authors	Year	Title	Publisher	ISBN	Notes
Chaney, Warren; Kosugi, Sho	2017	Yin-Yang Code: The Drums of Tenkai-Bo	MindStir Media	978-0-9990698-5-1	
Chaney, Warren; Kosugi, Sho	2018	Yin-Yang Code: Shadow of Tenkai-Bo	MindStir Media	978-0-9995121-4-2	
