= Choy Lee Fut (film) =

2011 Hong Kong film by Tony Law and Sam Wong

- Hong Kong poster
- Traditional Chinese: 蔡李佛
- Simplified Chinese: 蔡李佛
- Hanyu Pinyin: Cài Lǐ Fó
- Jyutping: Coi3 Lei5 Fat6
- Directed by: Tony Law; Sam Wong
- Written by: Ye Fengjin; Wanli; Zeng Chunhui
- Produced by: Ye Fengjin; Hao Lin; Chen Zhongjie; Feng Xiyun; Wu Xuwen
- Starring: Sammo Hung; Yuen Wah; Sammy Hung; Kane Kosugi; Stephen Wong; Lau Kar-wing; Dennis To
- Cinematography: Kwong Ting Wo
- Edited by: Cheung Ka Fai
- Music by: Lincoln Lo
- Production companies: Film Asia Entertainment Group; Guangzhou Yifeng Film Culture
- Distributed by: Film Asia Entertainment Group
- Release dates: 2 April 2011 (China); 7 April 2011 (Hong Kong)
- Running time: 92 minutes
- Country: Hong Kong
- Language: Cantonese

Choy Lee Fut (Chinese: 蔡李佛), also known as Fight the Fight in the United States, is a 2011 Hong Kong action film directed by Tony Law and Sam Wong, starring Sammo Hung, Yuen Wah, Sammy Hung, Kane Kosugi and Stephen Wong, with special appearances by Lau Kar-wing and Dennis To.

== Cast ==
- Sammo Hung as Chan Tin Loi (陳天來)
- Yuen Wah as Chan Tin Cheuk (陳天爵)
- Sammy Hung as Chan Wai Yip (陳偉業)
- Kane Kosugi as Mo Tin Siu Cho / Takeda Shosa (武田少佐)
- Stephen Wong as Cho Cheung Hung (左長空)
- Wang Jiayin as Ha Yu Fei (夏羽飛)
- Lau Kar Wing
- Dennis To
- Sam Wong as Qian Xin
- Ian Powers as X-Man
- Lau Wing Kin
- Li Chenxi
- Su Qianwei
- Joshua Dalisay
