= Press kit =

Set of promotional materials given to the media

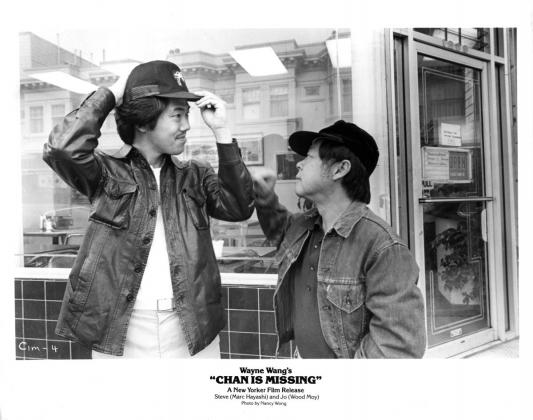
Press kit photo showing Marc Hayashi and Wood Moy on location in San Francisco's Chan Is Missing, a film by Wayne Wang, 1981.

A press kit, often referred to as a media kit in business environments, is a pre-packaged set of promotional materials that provide information about a person, company, organization or cause and which is distributed to members of the media for promotional use. Press kits are often distributed to announce a release or for a news conference.

== Terminology ==
Traditionally, the term "press kit" referred to a set of documents, photographs (such as publicity stills) and other relevant materials packaged together, and such a kit was designed to be sent to a newspaper or magazine as part of an organisation's public relations or promotional program. Recently, as print media circulation and readership levels have been declining, marketing and PR people have begun using the broader term, "media kit", so that it now refers to any promotional material distributed to any media outlet.

A PR media kit should not be confused with an advertising media kit developed by a newspaper or magazine for distribution to prospective advertisers. Advertising media kits typically consist of documents outlining the print media's editorial philosophy, detailed profiles of the medium's audience, a rate card and information about forthcoming special features.

== Uses ==
The press kit or media kit is a public relations staple, and an integral part of a company's media relations activities.

Press kits are typically used for:

- Product launches
- New company launch
- Mergers and acquisitions
- News conferences
- Announcements of special events, industry trade shows or exhibitions
- Accompany a press release or media release
- Notify the media of any newsworthy event within a company's sphere of activities

== Common components ==
There is no universal guide to the elements that should be included in a press kit or media kit, but the following are common components:

- Backgrounder with historical information on the company or individual.
- Fact sheet listing specific features, statistics, or benefits.
- Biographies of key executives, individuals, artists, etc.
- Past press coverage
- Photos or other images (high resolution) of key executives, logos, products, etc.
- A press release detailing the current news the media kit is sent in reference to
- Media contact information (usually of a public relations department or spokesperson)
- A CD, DVD, software title, video, etc. as appropriate for the sender of the release
- Collateral advertising material, such as: postcard, flyer, newspaper ad, etc.
- Packaging to hold the press kit, such as: a presentation folder or packet.

=== Band press kits ===
Musicians, including orchestras, bands and choral groups use media kits when launching a new album or when performing at a special event. Band press kits often have their own unique set of components, including:

- Band biography / History of the band
- CD or DVD
- Video
- Photos – colour or monotone (monotone (black and white) for newspapers; colour for other media)
- Press articles/ reviews
- Notable achievements
- Contact information for the band's label, manager, publicist, other representative and links to social media pages
- Discography (all previous albums and/or singles released by the band)
- [Optional] Equipment list (included when the kit is to be sent to a music venue)

== Electronic press kit (EPK) ==
An electronic press kit (EPK) is a press kit in electronic form. An EPK usually takes the form of a website or e-mail, though they can also be on CD or DVD. The press kit for the film Sneakers was accompanied by a floppy disk containing a custom program explaining the movie and was one of the first electronic press kits by a film studio. The first known EPK, as we know it today, premiered live on the web on January 8, 1995, and was invented and given the exact name electronic press kit or EPK by Andre Gray, the inventor of online music sales certifications and winner of The Johannes Gutenberg Inventor Prize. Gray's EPK featured a bio, audio clips, videos, photos, press, set list, basic technical requirements, and a calendar and featured R&B singer and songwriter Aaron Hall as the first artist ever to have an EPK created on their behalf.

=== Distribution formats ===
Many companies make their electronic press kits available via the corporate website, where kits are typically offered in PDF format. An electronic press kit can be provided via a wide range of digital media and download options.

=== Contents ===
The contents of an EPK media kit are similar to other types of media kit, but are likely to include a range of audio-visual material. Decisions about what to include in the EPK media kit will depend on the industry and target audience. As a general guide, an EPK in the music industry might contain the following:

- Biography
- Music clips (audio files, CD or DVD)
- High resolution press photos
- Forthcoming tour dates
- Promotional videos
- Offline website or website links, especially links to relevant social media and music websites
- Media reviews and interviews
- "RIYL" or "recommended if you like" list (list of artists in similar styles or genres)
- Contact information
- High resolution, colour photos or images of key executives, the company logo, products, etc.

== See also ==
- Advertising management
- Integrated marketing communications
- Marketing communications
- Media guide
- Media relations
- Promotion
- Promotion mix
- Public relations
- Trade advertisement
