= The Joy Luck Club (film) =

1993 American film by Wayne Wang

- Theatrical release poster
- Directed by: Wayne Wang
- Screenplay by: Amy Tan; Ronald Bass
- Based on: The Joy Luck Club (1989) by Amy Tan
- Produced by: Patrick Markey; Wayne Wang; Amy Tan; Ronald Bass
- Starring: Tsai Chin; Kieu Chinh; Lisa Lu; France Nuyen; Rosalind Chao; Lauren Tom; Tamlyn Tomita; Ming-Na Wen; Michael Paul Chan; Andrew McCarthy; Christopher Rich; Russell Wong; Vivian Wu
- Cinematography: Amir Mokri
- Edited by: Maysie Hoy
- Music by: Rachel Portman
- Production companies: Hollywood Pictures; Oliver Stone Productions
- Distributed by: Buena Vista Pictures Distribution
- Release date: September 8, 1993
- Running time: 139 minutes
- Country: United States
- Languages: English; Mandarin
- Budget: $10.5 million
- Box office: $32.9 million

The Joy Luck Club is a 1993 American drama film directed by Wayne Wang and written by Amy Tan and Ronald Bass, based on Tan's 1989 novel of the same name. It stars Tsai Chin, Kieu Chinh, Lisa Lu, France Nuyen, Rosalind Chao, Lauren Tom, Tamlyn Tomita, and Ming-Na Wen. It explores the relationships between Chinese-American women and their Chinese immigrant mothers. The film was produced by Bass, Tan, Wang, and Patrick Markey, while Oliver Stone served as an executive producer. Four older women, all Chinese immigrants living in San Francisco, meet regularly to play mahjong, eat, and tell stories. Each of these women has an adult Chinese-American daughter. The film reveals the hidden pasts of the older women and their daughters, and how their lives are shaped by the clash of Chinese and American cultures as they strive to understand their family bonds and one another.

Development of the project began when Wang approached Tan in 1989 at the time of the novel's release. Concerned about the novel's complex storytelling and character development, they teamed up with Bass in January 1990, who added a farewell party not in the original novel and voice-overs to compress the film's storytelling without changing the main plot. Carolco Pictures supported the project until 1990, when the filmmakers turned down the contract for not receiving the creative control that they demanded. After the first draft was written between August and November 1991, the filmmakers shifted to Hollywood Pictures in spring 1992. Principal photography took place in San Francisco, the novel and the film's main setting, in October 1992 and then in China in February 1993. Filming ended in March 1993.

The film was privately screened in sneak previews in spring 1993 and film festivals in August and September 1993. It premiered in Los Angeles, New York City, and San Francisco on September 8, 1993. With the film's $10.5 million budget, it was moderately successful in the box office, earning $32.9 million in the United States. It received positive critical reaction, but also criticism for its negative portrayal of Asian-American and Asian male characters. In 2020, the film was selected for preservation in the United States National Film Registry by the Library of Congress as being "culturally, historically, or aesthetically significant".

== Plot ==
The Joy Luck Club was formed by four women in San Francisco: Lindo Jong, Ying-Ying St. Clair, An-Mei Hsu, and Suyuan Woo. The members have mainly played mahjong and told each other stories over the years. They emigrated from China, remarried, and gave birth in America. Suyuan's daughter, June, replaced her when Suyuan died four months before the time the film is set. The mothers have high hopes for their daughters' successes, who struggle through "anxieties, feelings of inadequacy, and failures." They bond through understanding each other and overcoming their conflicts.

The film's present-day setting is June's farewell surprise party in San Francisco for her upcoming reunion with long-lost twin sisters in China. Among the guests are the Joy Luck Club, their daughters, relatives, and friends. The characters narrate their journeys while they reflect on their pasts.

=== Lindo and Waverly Jong ===
In China, four-year-old Lindo, born to a lower-class family, is betrothed to Tyan Yu, son of the wealthy Huang family. She moves into their household at age fifteen while her family migrates elsewhere. Her husband is young and immature, and Lindo spends the next four years in a sexless, loveless marriage, earning the ire of her mother-in-law for not bearing a son.

Lindo witnesses a servant being abandoned by her lover after she reveals to him that she is pregnant with his child. Plotting to leave the marriage without dishonor, Lindo feigns a nightmare where Tyan Yu's ancestor expresses displeasure toward the marriage. She claims the ancestor has impregnated the servant with Tyan Yu's child, and that the matchmaker who arranged the marriage intentionally paired Lindo and Tyan Yu for money. Furious, Mrs. Huang orders the matchmakers out, allows the servant to marry Tyan Yu, and gets her desired grandson. Lindo leaves and moves to Shanghai.

Years later in America, Lindo has a new husband, a son, and a daughter, Waverly. At six, Waverly develops an interest in chess and becomes a champion. Annoyed by Lindo constantly boasting about Waverly's accomplishments, Waverly quits chess. Later, she tries to play again, but finds her confidence lost and retires.

Now an adult, Waverly has a daughter from her Chinese ex-husband and is engaged to a white man, Rich, to Lindo's chagrin. Waverly brings Rich to a family dinner in hopes that Lindo will like him, but he improperly uses chopsticks and inadvertently insults Lindo's cooking, humiliating Waverly.

Some time later, Lindo and Waverly go to a hair salon in preparation for Waverly's upcoming wedding. At the salon, Lindo is offended her daughter would be embarrassed by her and becomes reluctant to attend the wedding. She tells her about a time with her own mother. When Waverly asks whether Lindo likes Rich, Lindo admits that she likes Rich very much and gives Waverly and Rich her blessings, leading Waverly and her to reconcile. Back at June's farewell party, Rich almost successfully uses chopsticks (but accidentally drops a piece) and impresses Lindo by trying to respect Chinese table manners.

=== Ying-Ying and Lena St. Clair ===
In China, Ying-Ying St. Clair is married to Lin-Xiao, who is handsome and charming but turns out to be abusive and unfaithful. Overwhelmed with depression, Ying-Ying dissociates and drowns their baby son in the bathtub, which haunts her. Years later, she immigrates to America and suffers from bouts of depression from the trauma, while worrying her daughter Lena will also suffer.

After Ying-Ying finally resolves her years of trauma, Lena shows her around the new apartment she shares with her husband Harold, who is also Lena's boss. Ying-Ying learns that Lena is uncomfortable with her financial arrangements with Harold. The couple split the costs of their life evenly with a list of things that they share, but Harold dominates the arrangements and ignores most of Lena's needs.

Seeing Lena's unhappiness with her marriage, Ying-Ying reasserts herself by knocking over a table in the bedroom, causing a vase to fall from the table and break. Hearing the noise, Lena goes to her mother where she admits her unhappiness. Ying-Ying tells her she should leave until Harold gives her what she wants. Shifting to the present, Lena is seen in a fulfilling relationship with a new fiancé.

=== An-Mei and Rose Hsu ===
Nine-year-old An-Mei Hsu is raised by her relatives. She is reunited with her mother, who was disowned by her family for becoming the fourth wife of a wealthy man—Wu-Tsing—shortly after her husband's death, and has returned to the household to care for her dying mother. Not wanting to be separated again, An-Mei moves with her mother to Wu-Tsing's house against her relatives' wishes.

Later in America, An-Mei's daughter, Rose, meets her future husband, Ted Jordan, in college. Ted is initially attracted to Rose's assertive, forthright nature. She marries him after he confronts his snobbish mother for making racist comments towards her. Throughout their marriage, Rose and Ted grow apart, mainly because Rose, desperate to fit in with Ted's associates, becomes submissive and demure at the cost of her own identity and interests. To complicate matters, Rose suspects that Ted is cheating, which he asserts is not the reason for their problems.

Some time later, An-Mei visits and relays the story of her own mother's fate to Rose. When An-Mei arrives at Wu-Tsing's house, the second wife gives An-Mei a pearl necklace as a gift. Dismayed that her daughter has been so easily won over, An-Mei's mother breaks the necklace, revealing it to be made of glass.

An-Mei learns the truth about how her mother became a fourth wife: while her mother was at the temple mourning her husband, the second wife befriended her, enticing her to meet Wu-Tsing, who later raped and impregnated her. The relatives did not believe she was raped and kicked her out of the house. Nowhere else to go, she reluctantly agreed to be Wu-Tsing's fourth wife. She gave birth to An-Mei's half brother, whom the second wife since has claimed as her own.

Telling An-Mei the truth about her situation, she commits suicide by eating dumplings laced with opium, choosing the day carefully to threaten Wu-Tsing with the vengeance of her angry ghost. In fear, he vows to honor An-Mei's mother as the first wife and promises to raise An-Mei and her half-brother accordingly. When the second wife tries to pay respects to An-Mei's late mother, An-Mei screams at her and destroys her necklace.

In the present, An-Mei encourages Rose to stand up to Ted. To avoid the fate of her grandmother, Rose reclaims her strength and confronts Ted, telling him to leave the house and her daughter. She tells him she was wrong to consider her love as less worthy than his, compelling Ted to stop taking her for granted. At the party, they are seen together kissing and sharing a slice of cake.

=== Suyuan and June Woo ===
During the Japanese invasion of China in World War II, Suyuan Woo escapes with her twin baby daughters, but becomes ill and her cart breaks down. Near death, she leaves them along with all her other possessions, including a photo of herself, as she is worried if she dies next to them it might hurt their chance of being rescued. Suyuan survives, but is haunted by guilt over the loss of her daughters and not knowing their fates.

After remarrying in America, Suyuan has high hopes for her new daughter, June, who falls short of her mother's expectations, in one case blundering a piano performance. A year before Suyuan's passing, June, now an adult, freelances for her rival Waverly. At a dinner party, Waverly rejects June's business proposals for not matching her style. Suyuan, exemplifying the differences between June and Waverly, says that style is something one cannot be taught but must be born with. June infers that her mother believes Waverly has style while she does not and is humiliated, believing her mother sees herself as a failure.

Later that evening, June berates Suyuan for her remarks and laments that Suyuan has always been disappointed in June because of her mediocre academic performance, lack of a serious relationship, and her less-than-successful job. Suyuan gives her a necklace that she has worn since June's birth, telling her it will guide her heart as it has done hers. Suyuan assures June she is the one with unteachable style, admitting while Waverly was better in competition, June had the best heart—the reason Suyuan is so proud to have June as her daughter.

On Easter before her farewell party, June receives news from the club that her twin sisters are alive. She cannot understand the twins' letter written in Chinese; Lindo purposely mistranslates the letter, claiming the twins are aware of Suyuan's death and the existence of their half sister June. In the present, after the party, Lindo confesses she wrote letters under Suyuan's name. June begs Lindo to tell them the truth, but Lindo tells her it is too late as the twin sisters are anticipating their mother, still believing that Suyuan is alive, and that June must be the one to inform them of their mother's death. When she arrives in China to meet them, June reveals the truth. The sisters finally embrace.

== Cast ==
from left: Suyuan (Kieu Chinh), June (Ming-Na Wen), Waverly (Tamlyn Tomita), Lindo (Tsai Chin), Ying-Ying (France Nuyen), Lena (Lauren Tom), An-Mei (Lisa Lu), and Rose (Rosalind Chao)

Mothers

- Kieu Chinh as Suyuan Woo
- Tsai Chin as Lindo Jong
  - Age 4: Ying Wu
  - Age 15: Irene Ng
- France Nuyen as Ying-Ying St. Clair
  - Age 16–25: Faye Yu
- Lisa Lu as An-Mei Hsu
  - Age 4: Emmy Yu
  - Age 9: Yi Ding

Daughters

- Ming-Na Wen as June Woo
  - Age 9: Melanie Chang
- Tamlyn Tomita as Waverly Jong
  - Age 6–9: Mai Vu
- Lauren Tom as Lena St. Clair
- Rosalind Chao as Rose Hsu Jordan

Other characters

- Michael Paul Chan as Harold, Lena's Husband
- Andrew McCarthy as Ted Jordan
- Christopher Rich as Rich
- Russell Wong as Lin Xiao
- Vivian Wu as An-Mei's Mother
- Victor Wong as Old Chong the Piano Teacher
- Xi Meijuan as Lindo's Mother
- Hsu Ying Li as the matchmaker
- Diane Baker as Mrs. Jordan
- Wu Tianming as Wu-Tsing
- Elizabeth Sung as Second Wife
- Chao-Li Chi as June's Father
- Philip Moon as Ken, Lena's Fiancé

== Production ==
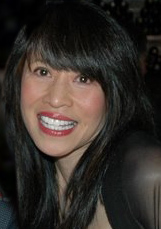
Lauren Tom

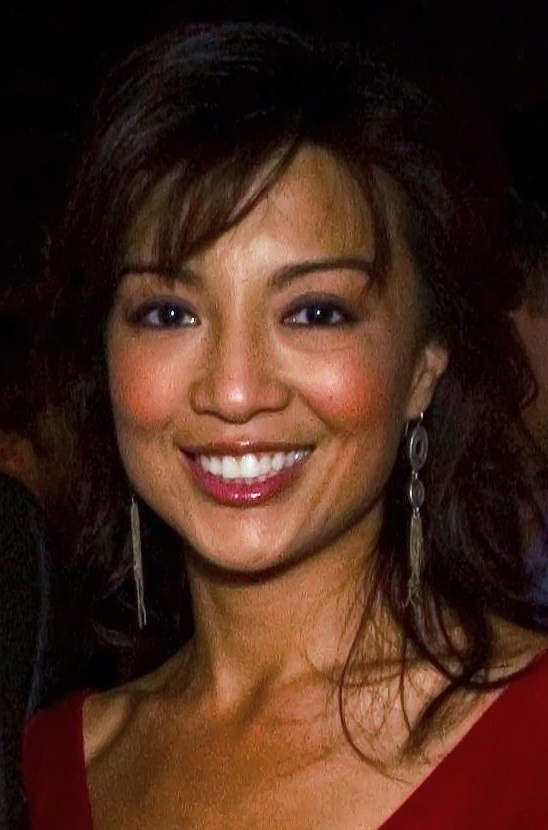
Ming-Na Wen

Before The Joy Luck Club, cast members Tom and Wen were relatively unknown to American audiences.

Amy Tan and Academy Award-winner Ronald Bass wrote the film adaptation. Wayne Wang, who made prior films about Chinese Americans, such as his first film, Chan Is Missing, was the director. Wang, Tan, Bass, and Patrick Markey were the producers. Oliver Stone and Janet Yang were the executive producers. The production designer was Don Burt. Maysie Hoy was the film editor.

When the novel, The Joy Luck Club, was released in 1989, Wayne Wang approached Amy Tan, the novel's author, with the idea of adapting the novel that he admired into a film. Wang and Tan grew concerned about transforming it into a film, and Wang was almost reluctant to make another film about Chinese Americans since Eat a Bowl of Tea because Wang's prior films had not attracted wide audiences. No Hollywood movies were known to have an all-Asian cast at the time, and making a film with Chinese protagonists was risky especially because Asian actors were not well known to American audiences. Ronald Bass, whom Wang and Tan teamed up with since their meeting at the Hotel Bel-Air in January 1990, analyzed the novel and outlined how to bring it to the screen, with "no single lead character." Because many studios found the novel's "characters and plot [...] too internal and complex" to adapt into a film, Bass added two additional changes without changing the main plot: June Woo's farewell party as the film's timeline setting and the first-person narration in addition to voice-overs to compress the film's storytelling.

A lot of executives and producers are afraid of voiceovers because they say it distances the audience from the action. I felt differently. It allowed you into the inner heart of the narrator [and] to understand their feelings in a way you could never do in dialogue.

— Ronald Bass

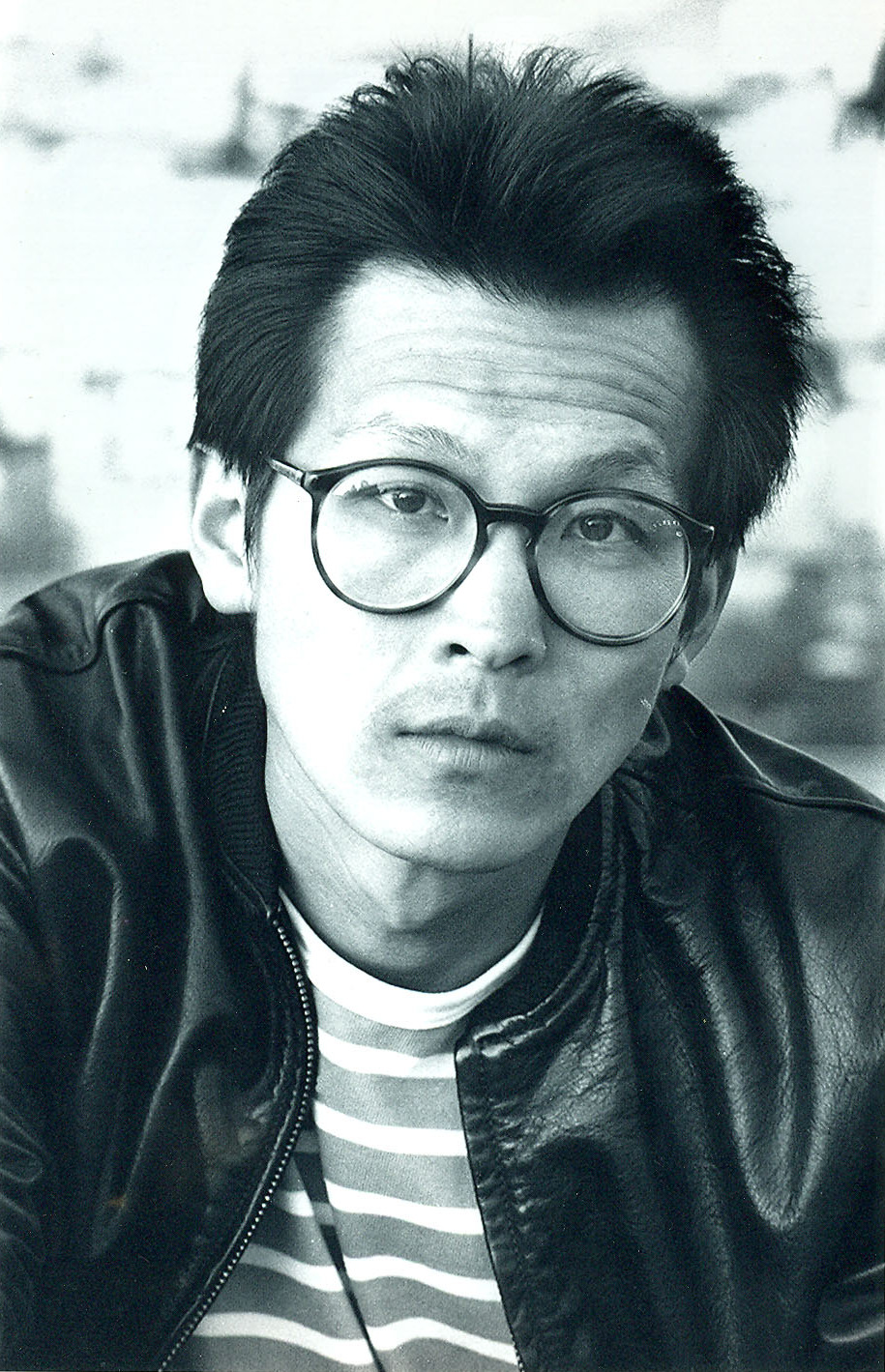
Wayne Wang, director and one of the producers

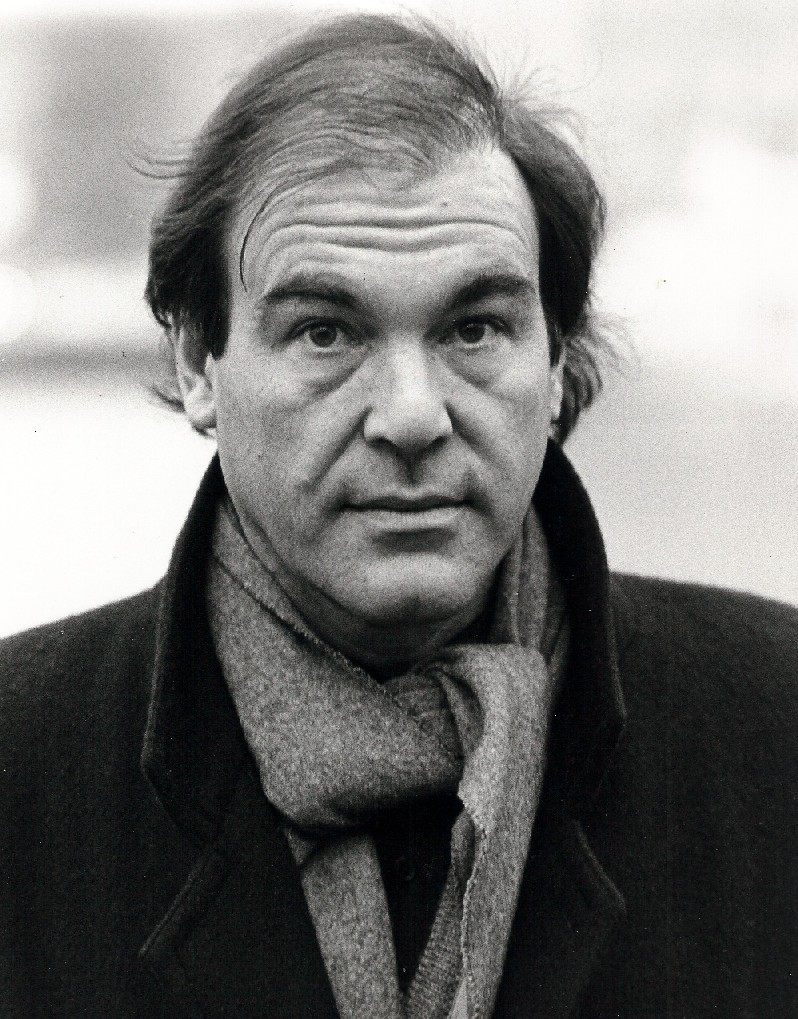
Oliver Stone, one of the executive producers

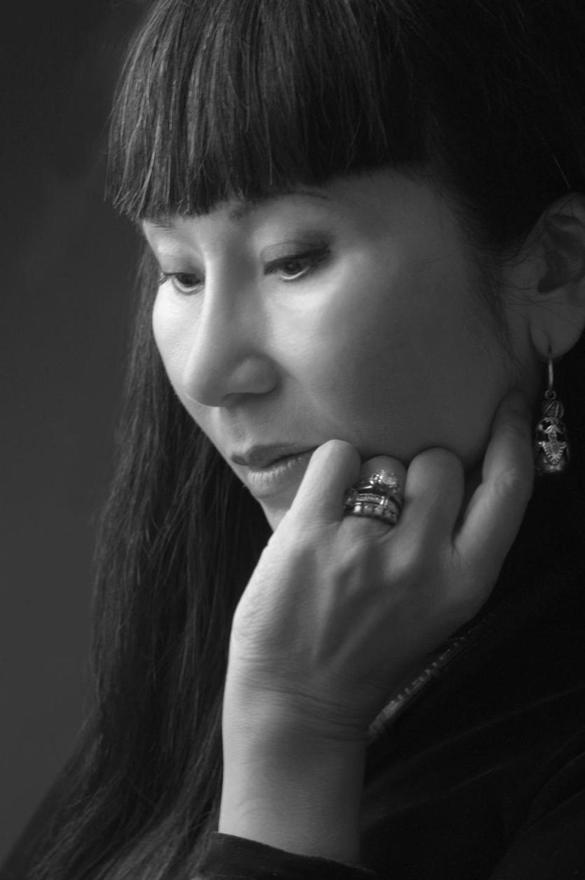
Amy Tan, novel author and one of the screenwriters

Wayne Wang, Amy Tan, and Ronald Bass teamed up with the Ixtlan Corporation, including its staff members, Oliver Stone and Janet Yang, who was the company's vice president and had a profound interest in the project. Before the project, Stone and Wang disagreed with each other about their own portrayals of Chinese people. Wang gave Stone's thriller Year of the Dragon a negative review for portraying Chinese characters as "[mobsters], gangsters, and prostitutes." Stone responded by calling Wang's Dim Sum: A Little Bit of Heart "boring" for its lack of action. Stone and Wang reconciled their differences, enabling them to work together and finally agreed to produce the film together, along with other producers.

Carolco Pictures initially agreed to support the project in spring 1990, but the company had fiscal problems, and the filmmakers turned down the contract in fall 1990 due to not receiving the level of creative control that they demanded. Therefore, Tan, Wang, and Bass outlined the screenplay themselves "in a narrative format" over three days in January 1991. Tan and Bass completed the first draft between August and November 1991. When they returned to Ixtlan in March 1992, Jeffrey Katzenberg, chairman of Walt Disney Studios, approved the project as proposed by Stone and Yang, and gave them full creative control. In spring 1992, Hollywood Pictures agreed to assist production and distribute the film.

Despite her lack of filmmaking experience, "[Amy] Tan found the process not nearly as bad as she had feared. She was happy that collaborating meant discussions and that they were followed by time to write on her own." Janet Yang said that although several studios were interested, Disney "was the only one to step up to the line". The producers were surprised, but Yang felt in retrospect that Joy Luck " fits in with Disney's agenda—taking a chance on low-budget projects not dependent on star power". She described Disney as being "less hands-on than usual" through not being familiar with the subject.

In regard to casting, director Wang filled fifty speaking parts for female characters and ten parts for male characters. He sought Asian actresses who were visually distinct, despite the lack of variation in hair color and ethnic features. Additionally, he sought actresses of different ages similar in appearance to younger or older selves as different parts of the film occur in different time periods. Additionally, he wanted to use several actresses and actors who spoke Mandarin, so this aspect limited casting options. A total of fifteen actresses portrayed the main characters, with the main group consisting of eight.

The experienced actresses France Nuyen, Tsai Chin, Lisa Lu, and Vietnamese-born Kieu Chinh were cast as the main mothers of the film.

Filming began in San Francisco in October 1992 and then in China in February 1993. Amy Tan did not participate in the casting, though Tan's mother, aunts, and four-year-old niece were extras in the movie, as well as Janet Yang's parents and Tan herself briefly. The filming was completed in March 1993. The film's budget totaled to $10.5–10.6 million.

Hsu Ying Li (1910–1993), who portrayed the matchmaker in the film, and worked as a culture consultant on set, was killed in a car accident in Oakland, California, on April 28, 1993. Therefore, the film is dedicated to her memory in the end credits.

== Reception ==
=== Audience and critical response ===
Reviews of The Joy Luck Club were generally positive. The film holds an 86% rating on Rotten Tomatoes based on 83 reviews, including 71 "fresh" ones. The site's consensus states: "The Joy Luck Club traces the generational divide, unearthing universal truths while exploring lives through the lens of a specific cultural experience." CinemaScore reported that audiences gave the film an "A+" grade. Critic Gene Siskel singled out the script and performances, praising the film for presenting images of Asian Americans outside the narrow range of childhood violinists and spelling-bee winners, opining that its main accomplishments were its depiction of how the brutality of the lives of women in China could continue to influence the lives of their American daughters, and its ability to allow audiences to relate to a large group of Chinese Americans as individuals. Siskel picked it as the seventh of the top ten movies of 1993, while Roger Ebert picked it as the fifth of his own top 10 movies of 1993.

It was voted one of the favorite films of 1993 among 1,297 readers of The Arizona Daily Star, ranked number 14 out of 253. However, when the film premiered in the United Kingdom, "some British critics found it more schmaltzy than sour-sweet."

Ty Burr from Entertainment Weekly graded it a C+ and wrote that the film "covers primal issues of abandonment, infanticide, motherly love, and self-respect, pounds you with pathos[, and] is extremely faithful to the novel". Burr found the story "exhausting" and preachy, he criticized the "cringingly bald, full of self-help blather" dialogue, and deemed male characters as "perfidies". However, he found the acting "generous [and] intelligent", and picked the segment of Rosalind Chao and Lisa Lu as "the only one that feels genuinely cinematic [yet] too late to save the movie".

David Denby from The New Yorker called the film "a superb achievement" and praised the director's "impressive visual skills". However, Denby criticized the film writing, "[I]ts tone is relentlessly earnest, its meanings limited or wanly inspirational, and my emotions, rather than well[ed] up, remained small." Moreover, he deemed men in the film as "caricatures" and the mothers' attempts to "teach [their daughters] the lesson of self-worth" as inadequate and pretentious.

Film critic Emanuel Levy graded the film a B+, calling it an "emotionally heart-rending study of generational gap–but also continuity–between Chinese mothers and their Chinese-American daughters" and a visually well-done propaganda for "cultural diversity". However, he also found it too long with "too many stories and […] flashbacks" and too mainstream and broad to be an art film, especially when it was screened in "prestigious film festivals." Matt Hinrichs from DVD Talk rated the film four and a half stars out of five, commenting, "Despite the cultural and gender-specific nature of the story, […] there are a lot of overriding themes explored here (such as the daughters fearing that they're repeating their moms' mistakes) that have a universal scope and appeal."

Harvard Crimson writer, Allen Soong, reflected that "while the women in this film are fully fleshed-out characters who are a remarkable improvement over the "exotic Oriental" Cassandra from Wayne's World, the male characters are merely additions to the long list of negative images of Asian men in our culture." He added that "the Asian men in The Joy Luck Club, ... are either domineering and misogynist in the worst imaginable way, or they're just clueless and aloof."

=== Prerelease and box office ===
In April 1993, Amy Tan watched the rough cut of The Joy Luck Club and praised it as an emotional tearjerker. It was thereafter screened to a bigger audience in mid-May, to an even broader audience a few weeks later, to the Asian American Journalists Association on the week of August 16, at the Telluride Film Festival on the Labor Day weekend, and at the Toronto International Film Festival in mid-September. The film opened to theatres at limited release in Los Angeles, New York City, and San Francisco on September 8, 1993. It slowly expanded to several hundred theatres by October 1 nationwide, including Salt Lake City, Utah, and St. Petersburg, Florida. It opened in some other cities on October 8, like Austin, Texas. The film earned nearly $33 million in the United States.

== Awards and nominations ==
Award	Ceremony	Category	Nominee	Result	Ref.
BAFTA Awards	April 23, 1995	Best Screenplay, Adapted	Amy Tan, Ronald Bass	Nominated	
Casting Society of America	October 20, 1994	Best Casting for Feature Film, Drama	Risa Bramon Garcia, Heidi Levitt	Won	
Gold House	May 6, 2023	Gold Generation Award	The cast & executive producer	Won	
National Board of Review Awards	December 14, 1993	Top Ten Film		Won	
USC Scripter Awards	January 1994	Best Film Adaptation of a Book	Amy Tan, Ronald Bass	Nominated	
Writers Guild of America Awards	March 13, 1994	Best Screenplay	Amy Tan, Ronald Bass	Nominated	
Young Artist Awards	February 15, 1994	Best Actress Under Ten	Melanie Chang	Nominated	
Young Artist Awards	February 15, 1994	Best Actress Under Ten	Mai Vu	Nominated	
Young Artist Awards	February 15, 1994	Best Youth Actress	Irene Ng	Nominated	

== Music ==
The soundtrack was released by Hollywood Records on September 28, 1993. It was composed and produced by Rachel Portman, co-orchestrated by Portman and John Neufeld, conducted by J. A. C. Redford. Chinese instruments were used as well as Western music. Filmtracks website and Jason Ankeny from Allmusic gave the soundtrack four stars out of five. Filmtracks found the music cues not as "outstanding" as Portman's "other singular achievements in her career" but the website noted that the whole album "never becomes too repetitive to enjoy[,]" even when the music cues lack diversity from each other. The first 14 tracks were composed by Rachel Portman. The 15th and final track, "End Titles", was composed by David Arnold, Marvin Hamlisch, and Rachel Portman. The album duration is around 44 minutes.

== Legacy and possible sequel ==
At the time the film was released, it was anticipated that Hollywood would begin to develop more films around the Asian experience, but this did not eventually happen. Flower Drum Song, released in 1961, was the first film to feature a majority Asian cast telling a contemporary Asian-American story. The Joy Luck Club (1993) was the second, a third of a century later. The third was released nine years later in 2002, Better Luck Tomorrow

In the 1990s, after the success of the film, Disney Studios contacted Amy Tan to discuss making her second novel, The Kitchen God's Wife, into a film, a spiritual successor/sequel to the first; however, negotiations fell through. In the waning of the glow of The Joy Luck Club, further Asian American stories were mostly shot down by studios after the brief rush following the film.

In 2018, Ronald Bass, the producer of the film, revealed that a sequel is in the works, waiting to be picked up by a studio or a network. Both a TV series pilot script and a sequel feature film script have been made. The intention is to reunite the original cast for the sequel, making the film's mothers into grandmothers and daughters into mothers, with Millennial children, in a three-generation story, following the developments of the families since the original film. The setting would be 25-years after the setting of the film.

In 2022, it was announced that the sequel was now in the works, and would be produced by Hyde Park Entertainment Group and producer Jeff Kleeman. The film was in production as of 2024 with a script being finished.

In 2020, the film was selected for preservation in the United States National Film Registry by the Library of Congress as being "culturally, historically, or aesthetically significant".

== Notes ==
=== References ===
- Dutka, Elaine (August 31, 1993). "Joy Luck: A New Challenge in Disney's World". Los Angeles Times.
- Liu, Sandra (2000). "Negotiating the Meaning of Access: Wayne Wang's Contingent Film Practice". Countervisions: Asian-American Film Criticism. Temple University Press. ISBN 1-56639-775-8. For paperback: ISBN 1-56639-776-6.
- Weinraub, Bernard (September 5, 1993). "FILM: 'I Didn't Want To Do Another Chinese Movie'". The New York Times.
- Tan, Amy (September 5, 1993). "COVER STORY: Joy, Luck and Hollywood". Los Angeles Times.
- Loos, Pamela (2008). A Reader's Guide to Amy Tan's The Joy Luck Club. Enslow Publishers Inc. ISBN 978-0-7660-2832-6.
