= Slam Dance (film) =

1987 film by Wayne Wang

- Theatrical release poster
- Directed by: Wayne Wang
- Written by: Don Keith Opper
- Produced by: Don Keith Opper
- Starring: Tom Hulce; Mary Elizabeth Mastrantonio; Virginia Madsen; Harry Dean Stanton; Millie Perkins; Don Keith Opper; Adam Ant; John Doe
- Cinematography: Amir Mokri
- Edited by: Sandy Nervig; Lee Percy
- Music by: Mitchell Froom
- Distributed by: Island Pictures (United States); Palace Pictures (United Kingdom)
- Release dates: May 13, 1987 (Cannes); October 2, 1987 (US); November 13, 1987 (UK)
- Running time: 100 minutes
- Countries: United Kingdom; United States
- Language: English
- Budget: $4.5 million
- Box office: $406,881

Slam Dance is a 1987 neo-noir thriller directed by Wayne Wang and starring Tom Hulce, Mary Elizabeth Mastrantonio, Virginia Madsen and Harry Dean Stanton. It was screened out of competition at the 1987 Cannes Film Festival.

== Plot ==
A married cartoonist named C. C. Drood becomes involved in the cover up of a political sex scandal after his lover, Yolanda Caldwell, a call girl, is found murdered.

Drood has betrayed his wife Helen with the exotic Yolanda, whom he meets at a club where the patrons slam dance, violently crashing into one another on the dance floor.

Bobby Nye, a former lesbian lover of Yolanda's, hires a hit man named Buddy to do away with Drood, who is also hotly pursued by the police. Drood ultimately comes to believe that Bobby and Buddy are the ones responsible for Yolanda's death. A corrupt cop, Gilbert, is doing everything in his power to pin the whole thing on Drood, but a police colleague, Smiley, intervenes on the wanted man's behalf.

Buddy is eventually overcome with guilt in his role in the killing of Yolanda, so he spares Drood's life and takes his own. To escape with his wife and his life, Drood tries to make Nye and the cops believe that Buddy's body is actually his.

== Cast ==
- Tom Hulce as C.C. Drood
- Mary Elizabeth Mastrantonio as Helen Drood
- Virginia Madsen as Yolanda Caldwell
- Harry Dean Stanton as Smiley
- Don Keith Opper as Buddy
- Adam Ant as Jim Campbell
- John Doe as John Gilbert
- Judith Barsi as Bean Drood
- Lisa Niemi as Miss Adrienne Schell
- Herta Ware as Mrs. Raines
- Millie Perkins as Bobby Nye
- Dennis Hayden as Mean Drunk

== Production and reception ==
After writing and directing Chan Is Missing and Dim Sum: A Little Bit of Heart, the latter receiving "mixed reviews [and] modest [...] box office earnings", Wayne Wang chose to direct Slam Dance to avoid being seen as a director primarily of stories about Chinese Americans; as such, it was Wang's first film in which none of the main characters are Chinese. Wang was unhappy with the finished film, which he blamed on interference from the producers, and tried to have his name removed from it.

The film grossed $486,881 in the United States on a $4.5 million budget and received mixed reviews. Critics had some praise for the acting and cinematography, but faulted the plot as disjointed and confusing. New York Times film critic Vincent Canby wrote in his November 6, 1987 review that Wang "goes straight if quite gracefully to the bottom with his first mainstream movie", describing it as "less interesting for its characters than for its fancy decor and images."

== Release dates ==
- Canada - September 11, 1987 (Toronto Festival of Festivals)
- United States - October 2, 1987
- UK - November 13, 1987
- Italy - November 13, 1987
- Finland - November 27, 1987
- Norway - December 26, 1987
- Sweden - February 5, 1988
