= Amy Hill =

American actress (born 1953)

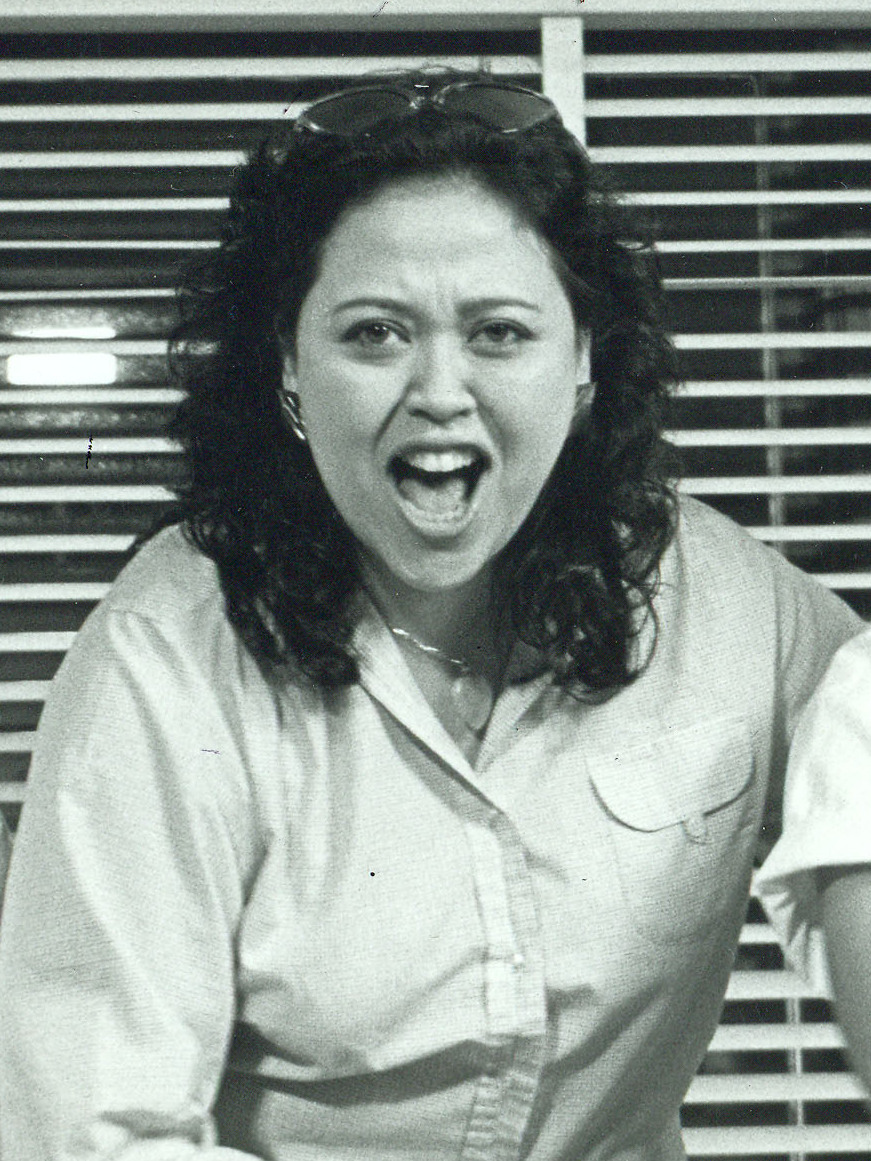
- Hill in 1983
- Born: Amy Marie Hill; May 9, 1953 (age 73); Deadwood, South Dakota, U.S.
- Occupations: Actress; stand-up comedian
- Years active: 1984–present
- Children: 1

Amy Marie Hill (born May 9, 1953) is an American actress and stand-up comedian. Hill's first major role was as Yung-Hee "Grandma" Kim on All-American Girl.

Hill has been a mainstay on American television in her work, many of her roles being major recurring roles, the most notable being: Mrs. DePaulo on That's So Raven, Mama Tohru on Jackie Chan Adventures, Mrs. Hasagawa in Lilo & Stitch: The Series (reprising the same character she played in Lilo & Stitch), Ah-Mah Jasmine Lee in The Life and Times of Juniper Lee, Judy Harvey in Enlightened, Mah Mah Ling in American Dad!, Beverly Tarantino in Mom and Ms. Mannering in Preacher.

Hill was a series regular on the Amazon Prime Video show Just Add Magic as Mama P along with recurring in Unreal as Dr. Wagerstein on the basic cable network Lifetime and The CW romantic comedy musical Crazy Ex-Girlfriend as Lourdes Chan. She also plays Teuila "Kumu" Tuileta, the cultural curator of Robin Masters' estate, in the 2018 reboot series Magnum P.I.

In film, she played Mrs. Kwan in The Cat in the Hat, Sue in 50 First Dates, and Mrs. Ho-Kym in Next Friday.

== Early life ==
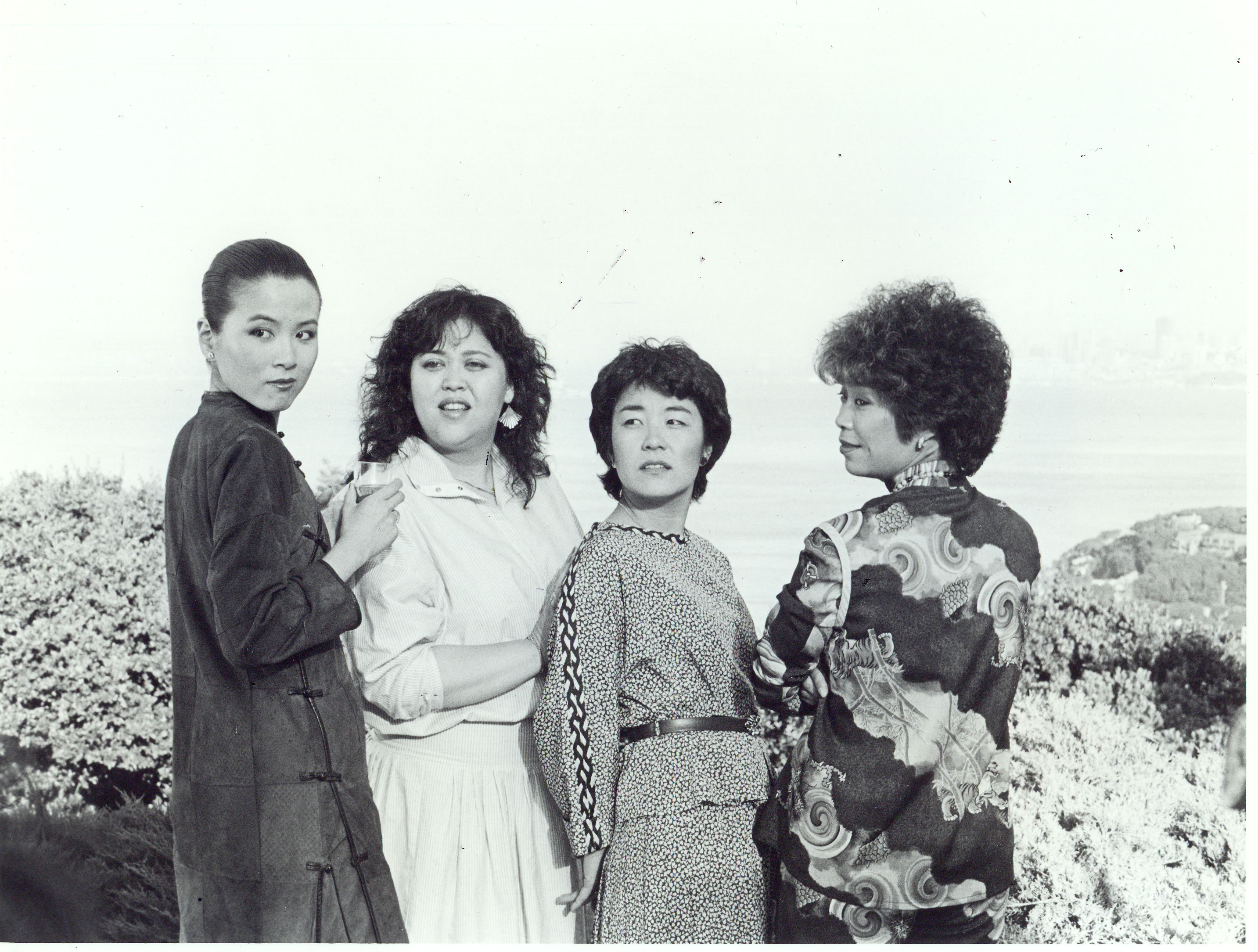
From left, Cora Miao, Hill, Rita Yee and Laureen Chew in 1983.

Hill was born on May 9, 1953, in Deadwood, South Dakota, to Japanese national Ayako Yoneoka Hill (1914–2008) and Archie Russell Hill (1923–1979), a Finnish American who died after an automobile accident when Hill was 26 years old.

== Career ==
Hill was in Margaret Cho's short-lived sitcom All-American Girl in the role of grandmother Yung-hee, better known as Grandma or Grandma Kim.

Following the cancellation of All-American Girl, Hill played Kay Ohara on Maybe This Time, in which she worked with Betty White and former All American Girl co-star Ashley Johnson.

She starred in the films Max Keeble's Big Move, Big Fat Liar, The Cat in the Hat, Let's Go to Prison, Lilo & Stitch (and its 2025 live-action adaptation), Big Gay Love, and 50 First Dates.

She guest-starred on Night Court, Six Feet Under, Desperate Housewives, Two and a Half Men, King of the Hill, 3rd Rock from the Sun, The Sarah Silverman Program, and My Wife & Kids. She had recurring roles on TV shows as well, including as the lesbian daughter of D. L. Hughley's neighbor (played by Pat Morita) on The Hughleys, the upstairs neighbor of Monica and Rachel on Friends, Mrs. DePaulo on That's So Raven, Mama Tohru on Jackie Chan Adventures, Mrs. Hasagawa on Lilo & Stitch: The Series, Penny Candy on The Puzzle Place, Maureen Nervosa, the owner of Cafe Nervosa on Frasier, Mah Mah, the adopted mother of Francine on American Dad!, Dr. Lauren Brown on General Hospital, and Suji on The Naked Truth. In the sixth-season finale of Seinfeld, she played the part of Frank Costanza's long-lost girlfriend during his Korean War service. She played Pang Bing, the antagonist of the series finale of Kung Fu Panda: Legends of Awesomeness. She also appeared in Season 2, Episode 10 of Curb Your Enthusiasm (2001).

She had regular roles on Strip Mall and as "Ah-Mah" Jasmine Lee on The Life and Times of Juniper Lee. Hill has recurring roles as Beverley on Mom and Ms. Mannering on Preacher.

From 2018–2021, Hill co-starred as Teuila "Kumu" Tuileta, the cultural curator of Robin Master's estate, in the reboot series Magnum P.I.

== Filmography ==
=== Film ===
Year	Title	Role	Notes
1985	Dim Sum: A Little Bit of Heart	Amy Tam	
1992	Judgement	Dorothy Moys	
1993	Rising Sun	Hsieh	
1998	Yellow	Snake Ajima	
2000	Next Friday	Mrs. Ho-Kym	
2000	Straight Right	Mrs. Geddes	
2000	Auggie Rose	Karla	
2001	Pavilion of Women	Madame kang	
2001	The New Women	Gaia	
2001	Max Keeble's Big Move	Mrs. Rangoon	
2002	Big Fat Liar	Joscelyn Davis	
2002	Lilo & Stitch	Mrs. Hasagawa (voice)	
2002	When Angels Cry	Pam	Short
2003	The Cat in the Hat	Mrs. Kwan	
2003	Cheaper by the Dozen	Miss Hozzie	
2004	50 First Dates	Sue	
2005	Herbie: Fully Loaded	Female Doctor	
2006	Let's Go to Prison	Judge Eva Fwae Wun	
2007	Finishing the Game	Mrs. Tyler	
2007	South of Pico	Maria	
2009	Legally Blondes	Ms. Chang	Direct-to-video
2009	Curious George 2: Follow That Monkey!	Flower Pot Lady, Irate Woman (voice)	
2012	White Frog	Dr. King	
2012	Family Restaurant	Christienne	Short film
2013	Big Gay Love	Dr. Barrenbottom	
2015	Man Up	Eileen	
2015	Imperfect Sky	Dr. Lowe	
2016	The Unbidden	Rachel	
2016	Coffee House Chronicles: The Movie	Myrtle	
2016	Catfight	Aunt Charlie	
2016	Lego DC Comics Super Heroes: Justice League – Gotham City Breakout	Madame Mantis (voice)	Direct-to-video
2017	Spider-Man: Homecoming	Decathlon Moderator	
2019	Remind Me	Cathy	Short film
2022	Mack & Rita	Carol	
2025	Lilo & Stitch	Tūtū	

=== Television ===
Year	Title	Role	Notes
1984	Partners in Crime	Mai Ling	Episode: "Celebrity"
1987	The Real Ghostbusters	Anne Lawson	Episode: "The Revenge of Murray the Mantis"
1988	Growing Pains	Dr. Celeste Buhai	Episode: "State of the Union"
1988	Night Court	Namilama	Episode: "Danny Got His Gun"
1988	It's a Living	Martha Dumond	Episode: "The New Guy Show"
1990	Perfect Strangers	Roy	Episode: "The Men Who Knew Too Much: Part 2"
1991	Baby Talk	Mrs. Vitale	Episode: "A Star Is Newborn"
1993	Nurses	Joanna Joyce	Episode: "No, But I Played One on TV"
1994–95	All-American Girl	Yung-hee 'Grandma' Kim	Main role
1995	Seinfeld	Kim	Episode: "The Understudy"
1995	The Puzzle Place	Penny Candy	Episode: "Cute Is as Cute Does"
1995, 1997, 1999	Happily Ever After: Fairy Tales for Every Child	Ma-Ma/Mrs. Oolong, Ming, The Empress (voice)	3 episodes
1995–96	Maybe This Time	Kay Ohara	Main role
1996	Spider-Man: The Animated Series	Susan Choi (voice)	2 episodes
1997	Boston Common	Mrs. Sakini	Episode: "The Occidental Purists"
1997	Pauly	Sumi	Main role
1997–98	The Naked Truth	Suji	Main role (season 3)
1998	Twelfth Night	Maria	TV film
1999–00	The Hughleys	Mrs. Fujino, Joanie Park	3 episodes
2000	Unauthorized: The Mary Kay Letourneau Story	Soona Vili	TV film
2000	Friends	Woman	Episode: "The One With All the Candy"
2000–01	Strip Mall	Fanny Sue Chang	Main role
2001	3rd Rock from the Sun	Rita	Episode: "A Dick Replacement"
2001	Virtually Casey	Principal Ono	TV film
2001	The Wild Thornberrys: The Origin of Donnie	Ibu (voice)	Television film
2001	My Wife and Kids	Nurse Lorraine	2 episodes
2001–02, 2005	Jackie Chan Adventures	Mama Tohru (voice)	Recurring role (seasons 2–3), guest (season 5)
2002	One on One	Ms. Kim	Episode: "Me & My Shadow"
2002	Andy Richter Controls the Universe	Sylvia	Episode: "Grief Counselor"
2002	King of the Hill	Michiko	Episode: "Returning Japanese"
2002	The Proud Family	Mrs. Wong (voice)	Episode: "Romeo Must Wed"
2002	MDs	Amy Park	Episode: "A La Casa"
2003	Still Standing	Mrs. Cutler	Episode: "Still Excelling"
2003	Frasier	Maureen Nervosa	Episode: "Farewell, Nervosa"
2003	Eve	Maribel	Episode: "The Talk"
2003	King of the Hill	Laoma Souphanousinphone (voice)	Episode: "Maid in Arlen"
2003–05	That's So Raven	Mrs. DePaulo	Guest role (seasons 1–3)
2003–05	Lilo & Stitch: The Series	Mrs. Hasagawa (voice)	Recurring role
2004	Kim Possible	Dr. Wanda Wong (voice)	Episode: "The Truth Hurts"
2004	Six Feet Under	Madame Mana Lisa	Episode: "Can I Come Up Now?"
2004	Hot Momma	Ruth	TV film
2004	Without a Trace	Pacita Ojeda	Episode: "Upstairs Downstairs"
2004–05	North Shore	Bobbie Seau	2 episodes
2005	Jake in Progress	Gert	Episode: "Sign Language"
2005	The Closer	Franny	2 episodes
2005	Hot Properties	Mary	Main role
2005	Avatar: The Last Airbender	Superior (voice)	Episode: "Bato of the Water Tribe"
2005–06	Related	Grace	3 episodes
2005–06	The Life and Times of Juniper Lee	Ah Mah (voice)	16 episodes
2006	Desperate Housewives	Mrs. Pate	Episode: "Don't Look at Me"
2006	Just for Kicks	Lucy Costello	Episode: "I Love Lucy"
2006	American Dragon: Jake Long	Aunt Cathy (voice)	Episode: "Feeding Frenzy"
2007	In Case of Emergency	Mrs. Lee	Episode: "Your Goose Is Cooked"
2007	The Sarah Silverman Program	Judge Gu	Episode: "Joan of Arf"
2007	Grey's Anatomy	Joanne	Episode: "Let the Truth Sting"
2007	Legion of Super Heroes	K3NT (voice)	Episode: "The Man from the Edge of Tomorrow"
2007–13	American Dad!	Mah Mah (voice)	Recurring role
2008	Boston Legal	Dr. Kathleen Rosewell	Episode: "Mad About You"
2008	The Return of Jezebel James	Dr. Koe	Episode: "Pilot"
2008	Ghost Whisperer	Adrienne	Episode: "Firestarter"
2008	Eli Stone	Judge Uchimura	Episode: "Happy Birthday, Nate"
2009	General Hospital	Dr. Laura Brown	Guest role
2009	DJ & The Fro	Karen, Amy Jarowski	TV series
2009	The Goode Family	Kiki, Jacki (voice)	4 episodes
2009	Glee	Dr. Chin	Episode: "Throwdown"
2009	Castle	Alma	Episode: "Vampire Weekend"
2010	Two and a Half Men	Mrs. Wiggins	Episode: "Ixnay on the Oggie Day"
2010	Law & Order: LA	Judge Taryn Tanabe-Ford	Episode: "Pasadena"
2011	The Mentalist	Nurse Viola Hearn	Episode: "Bloodstream"
2011	State of Georgia	Li	Episode: "There's a Place for Us"
2011	Reed Between the Lines	Mrs. McDonaugh	Episode: "Let's Talk About Dishonesty"
2011	Family Practice	Jenny Kim	TV film
2011–12, 2016	Kung Fu Panda: Legends of Awesomeness	Su, Mrs. Gow, Pang Bing (voice)	3 episodes
2011–13	Enlightened	Judy Harvey	Recurring role
2012	Retired at 35	Mary	Episode: "The Apartment"
2013	The Office	Nail Salon Manager	Episode: "Couples Discount"
2013	Arrested Development	Noh	Episode: "Queen B."
2013	You and Your Fucking Coffee	Amy	Episode: "Election Day"
2013	The League	Mrs. Hatch	Episode: "Heavy Petting"
2013	Sean Saves the World	Mrs. Ling	Episode: "Of Moles and Men"
2013	The Legend of Korra	Air Acolyte (voice)	Episode: "The Southern Lights"
2014	Jessie	Keahi	Episode: "Jessie's Aloha Holidays with Parker and Joey"
2014	Hawaii Five-0	Tour Guide	Episode: "Kanalu Hope Loa"
2015	Sanjay and Craig	Chef Mei (voice)	Episode: "Dangerous Debbie"
2015–16	Unreal	Dr. Wagerstein	Recurring role (seasons 1–2)
2015–18	Crazy Ex-Girlfriend	Lourdes Chan	Recurring role (seasons 1–3)
2015–17	Mom	Beverly Tarantino	Recurring role (seasons 2–5)
2016	Life in Pieces	Principal Bundy	Episode: "Prank Assistant Gum Puppy"
2016–17	The Great Indoors	Carol	4 episodes
2016–19	Just Add Magic	Ida 'Mama P' Perez	Main role
2017	Preacher	Ms. Mannering	Recurring role (season 2)
2018	Black-ish	Nana Jean	2 episodes
2018	Santa Clarita Diet	Dr. Kellog	Episode: "No Family Is Perfect"
2018	3 Year Plan	Coral Castaneda	TV series
2018–19	Kung Fu Panda: The Paws of Destiny	Grandma Panda (voice)	Main role
2018–24	Magnum P.I.	Teuila "Kumu" Tuileta	Main role
2019	Costume Quest	Lily Chu (voice)	4 episodes
2020–21	Cleopatra in Space	Professor Sitre (voice)	Recurring role
2020	Boy Luck Club	Mama Lai	Episode: "Party Mama"
2021	Doogie Kamealoha, M.D.	Dr. Takushi	Episode: "Love is a Mystery"
2021	Big City Greens	Mrs. Sato (voice)	Episode: "Rent Control"
2021	Yasuke	Daimyo (voice)	4 episodes
2022	Kung Fu Panda: The Dragon Knight	Pei-Pei (voice)	Episode: "A Cause for the Paws"
2025	Ballard	Tutu	Main Role
TBA	UDrive Me	Toni	TV series, pre-production

== Stage ==
Year	Title	Role(s)	Venue	Notes	Ref.
1978	Hollywood Mirrors	performer	Asian American Theater Company		
1979	Coda/Points of Departure	performer	Asian American Theater Company		
1979	Intake-Outake	performer	Asian American Theater Company		
1979	Jelly Belly	performer	Asian American Theater Company		
1980	The Avocado Kid/Zen in the Art of Guacamole	performer	Asian American Theater Company		
1982	The House of Sleeping Beauties	performer	Asian American Theater Company		
1982	Obon, Festival of the Dead	performer	Asian American Theater Company		
1982	The Dream of Kitamura	performer	Asian American Theater Company		
1982	Not My Fault	performer	Asian American Theater Company		
1983	Lo Foo and the Missing Ming Artifact	performer	Asian American Theater Company		
1984	The Sound of a Voice/The House of Sleeping Beauties	performer	Asian American Theater Company		
1985	Tea	performer	Asian American Theater Company		
1991	Tokyo Bound	performer	US national tour	playwright	
1996	Flying Solo Friends	performer	Actors Theatre of Louisville		
1998	Twelfth Night	Maria	Vivian Beaumont Theater	Broadway debut	
2008	Voices from Okinawa	Obaa-San	East West Players		
2009	Peace	performer	Culture Clash		
2011	Wrinkles	Nancy	East West Players		
2021	Our Town	Stage Manager	National Asian American Theatre Company		
2021	Cymbeline	Cymbeline	National Asian American Theatre Company		

== Awards and nominations ==
Hill was nominated for a regional Emmy (Los Angeles Area) as writer/host of Get Real, an Asian-American teen talk show on KSCI.
