= George Woo =

American academic and actor

- Born: February 1, 1938 (age 88); Hong Kong
- Occupations: Educator, ethnic studies scholar, activist, photographer
- Years active: 1970–2001 (educator)
- Employer: San Francisco State University
- Known for: Teaching Asian American studies, former spokesperson for the Wah Ching

George Kee Woo (born February 1, 1938) is a Chinese-American professor, actor, and photographer. Going from the spokesperson for the Wah Ching organization in 1968, he ultimately became a professor at San Francisco State University. He was also an actor in Wayne Wang's films, including as George in Chan Is Missing, alongside future colleague, Laureen Chew.

George Woo was born in Hong Kong and immigrated to San Francisco in 1953 at the age of 15. He attended Galileo High School and graduated in 1956. Because of rent prices, he lived with his second brother on Waverly Place and Stockton Street in Hop Sing Tong’s rooming house where he shared a room with two of his brothers. When he arrived, there were no education systems for bilingual children, just special classes for immigrants depending on their level of English knowledge. Woo proceeded to join the United States Navy on his birthday, February 1, 1957; after his discharge four years later, he first worked for Sunset magazine as a photographer’s assistant before quitting in 1967, after deciding that he didn’t want to pursue that kind of life.

On a walk through Chinatown, George Woo was confronted by social workers in charge of the town’s children. They explained their grievances in fighting against a system that seemingly works to keep the impoverished children of Chinatown in poverty, asking him for advice on what they should do. Woo suggested that they hold a press conference that would allow them to make their issues known and press for the necessary change. The workers, after some consideration, agreed, however they had no idea how to set one up. Already invested, George Woo offered his help and took charge in leading the coordination of the press conference alongside handwriting notes to newspapers and radio stations to hopefully get their conference broadcast and known to the wider public, interviewing members of the community to get their perspective into consideration, and setting up a venue for the actual press conference in the Chinese American Citizens Association’s (CACA) auditorium.

The Chinese American Citizen’s Association decided at the last minute that they'd changed their minds, and attempted to renege on the usage of the auditorium. George Woo, surprised and annoyed, told the Association, “I have a screwdriver; I can open your door really easily. I don’t care whether you let us or not.” This bold statement earned him not only the right to use the auditorium, but also the role of being the press conference’s spokesperson, and ultimately as the spokesperson for the Wah Ching.

The press conference drew in all sorts of people, including but not limited to: ordinary residents of Chinatown, students from Galileo high school, various anti- poverty programs in Chinatown, and the Chinese Six Companies. Throughout the press conference George Woo also worked as a translator due to his proficiency in both English and Chinese. In that conference, Woo advocated for Chinatown to receive anti-poverty funds, specifically calling for programs to get funds from the government in order to teach children in Chinatown basic English

One of his most prominent moments involved speaking out against the leadership in San Francisco's Chinatown that kept the city in a state of poverty and stagnation. In 1969, after the Third World Liberation Front strikes of 1968, he was profiled by Tom Wolfe in an article for Esquire, "The New Yellow Peril."

In 1970, during his time as a student, Woo was hired to teach ethnic studies in the Asian American studies department at San Francisco State University (he would graduate with a degree in photography), and became the Asian American Studies Department Chair in 1984. He became emeritus in 2001.
