= Peter Wang =

American film director

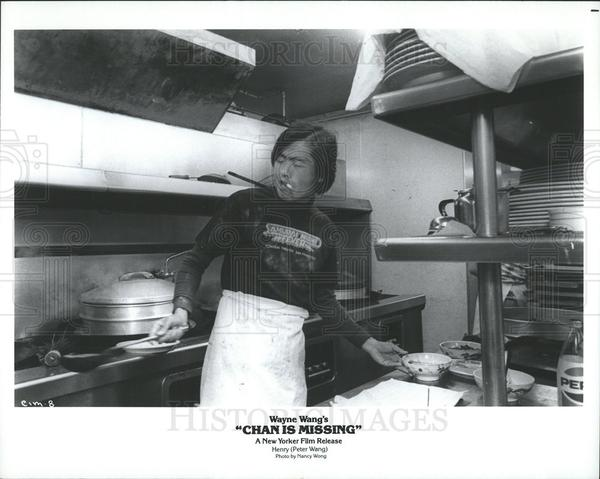
Promotional photo from Chan Is Missing, 1981.

Peter Wang (Chinese: 王正方; pinyin: Wáng Zhèngfāng) is a Taiwanese actor and director from Beijing. He is best known for writing and directing the 1986 film, A Great Wall, the first American feature to be co-produced by the People's Republic of China.

Wang was born in Beijing but grew up in Taiwan following the Chinese Communist Revolution in 1949. Wang emigrated to the United States in the 1970s to pursue a PhD in electro-optics at the University of Pennsylvania but during a teaching stint at San Mateo College in the Bay Area, he began acting at San Francisco's Asian Living Theatre. Wang's first film role came as Henry, a singing Chinatown chef, in Wayne Wang's Chan Is Missing (1982). In 1983, Wang and producer Shirley Sun partnered with the Chinese production company, Nanhai, and this led to Wang writing, directing and starring in A Great Wall. For 1988's sci-fi film The Laser Man, Wang revisited his experiences in graduate school where he had studied laser weapon research.

== Filmography ==
- Chan Is Missing (1982)
- A Great Wall (1986)
- The Laser Man (1988)
- First Date (1989)
