= A Man, a Woman, and a Killer =

- Directed by: Rick Schmidt; Wayne Wang
- Written by: Dick Richardson; Rick Schmidt; Wayne Wang
- Produced by: Rick Schmidt
- Starring: Dick Richardson; Ed Nylund; Carolyn Zaremba
- Cinematography: Rick Schmidt
- Edited by: Rick Schmidt
- Release date: March 17, 1975
- Running time: 78 minutes
- Country: United States
- Language: English
- Budget: 16,000

A Man, a Woman, and a Killer is a 1975 American drama film directed by Rick Schmidt and Wayne Wang. It is Wang's directorial debut.

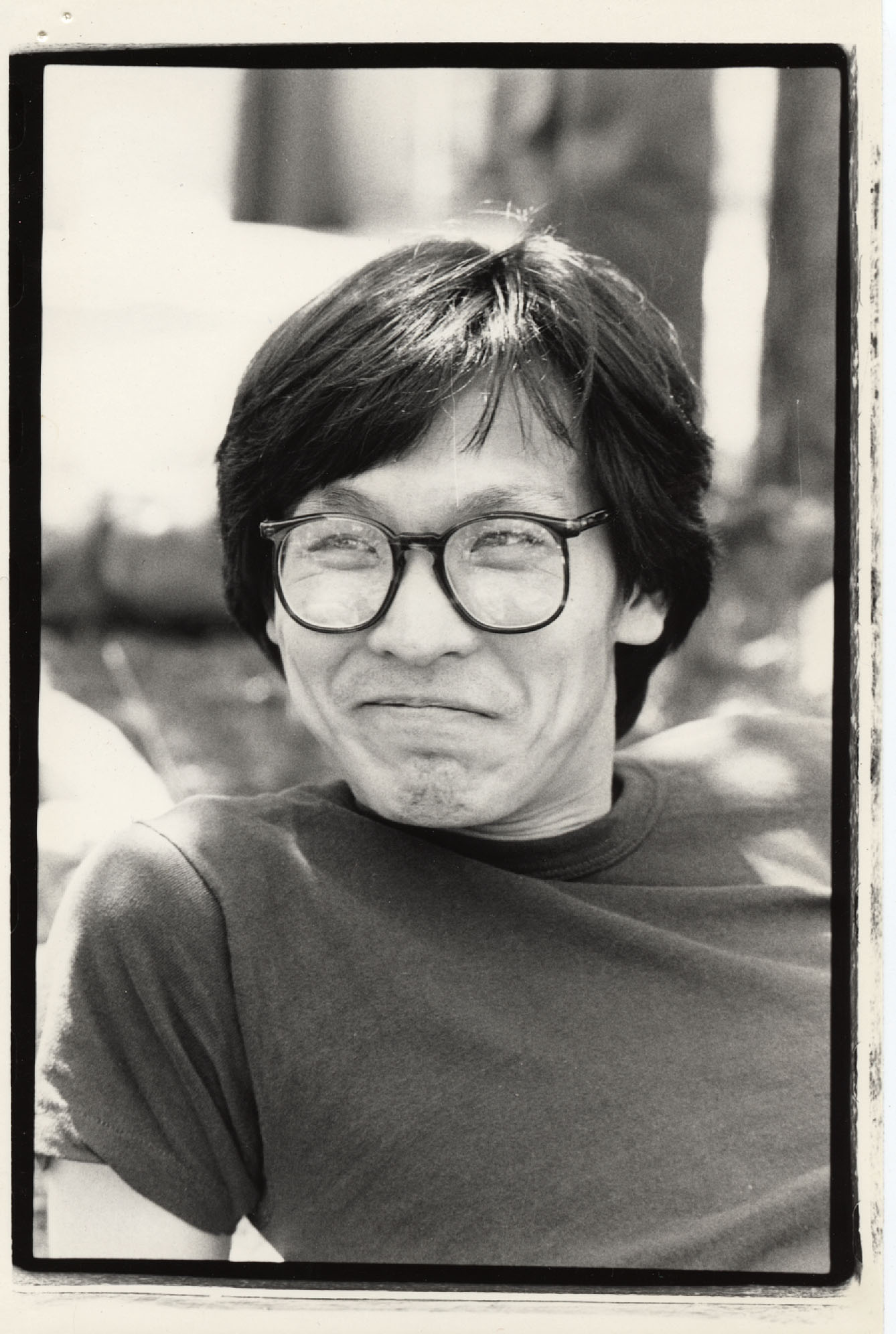
Wang in San Francisco, 1980

== Plot ==
The story of a small-time gangster writing his journal in a Mendocino, California, farmhouse, as he awaits a hit man who is coming to kill him. In this first part of a trilogy, realities continue to shift between the story, and the actual making of the film, as seen through unscripted scenes, real-life narrations by lead actors, and the real relationship that developed on the set between Richardson and the actress who played his girlfriend. A bumbling, local librarian is mistaken for the "killer" and plays along with the game.

== Cast ==
- Dick Richardson as Dick
- Ed Nylund as Ed
- Carolyn Zaremba as Z

== Production ==
The film was made in 1973 with a budget of $16,000.

== Reception ==
A. H. Weiler of The New York Times gave the film a negative review and wrote that it "emerges as a largely static and undramatic film about the making of a film."
