= The Laser Man =

1988 Hong Kong film by Peter Wang

- Film poster
- Directed by: Peter Wang
- Written by: Peter Wang
- Produced by: Peter Wang; Tsui Hark (executive producer)
- Starring: Marc Hayashi; Maryann Urbano; Tony Leung Ka Fai; Peter Wang; Joan Copeland; George Bartenieff; David Chan; Sally Yeh; Neva Small; Christopher Curry
- Cinematography: Ernest Dickerson
- Edited by: Grahame Weinbren
- Music by: Marco Daring
- Distributed by: Film Workshop
- Release date: September 25, 1988 (US)
- Running time: 92 minutes
- Country: Hong Kong
- Language: Mandarin

The Laser Man is a 1988 Hong Kong film in the style of a crime drama parody.

== Cast ==
- Marc Hayashi
- Maryann Urbano
- Tony Leung Ka Fai
- Peter Wang
- Joan Copeland
- George Bartenieff
- David Chan
- Sally Yeh
- Neva Small
- Christopher Curry
