= Wood Moy =

American actor (1918–2017)

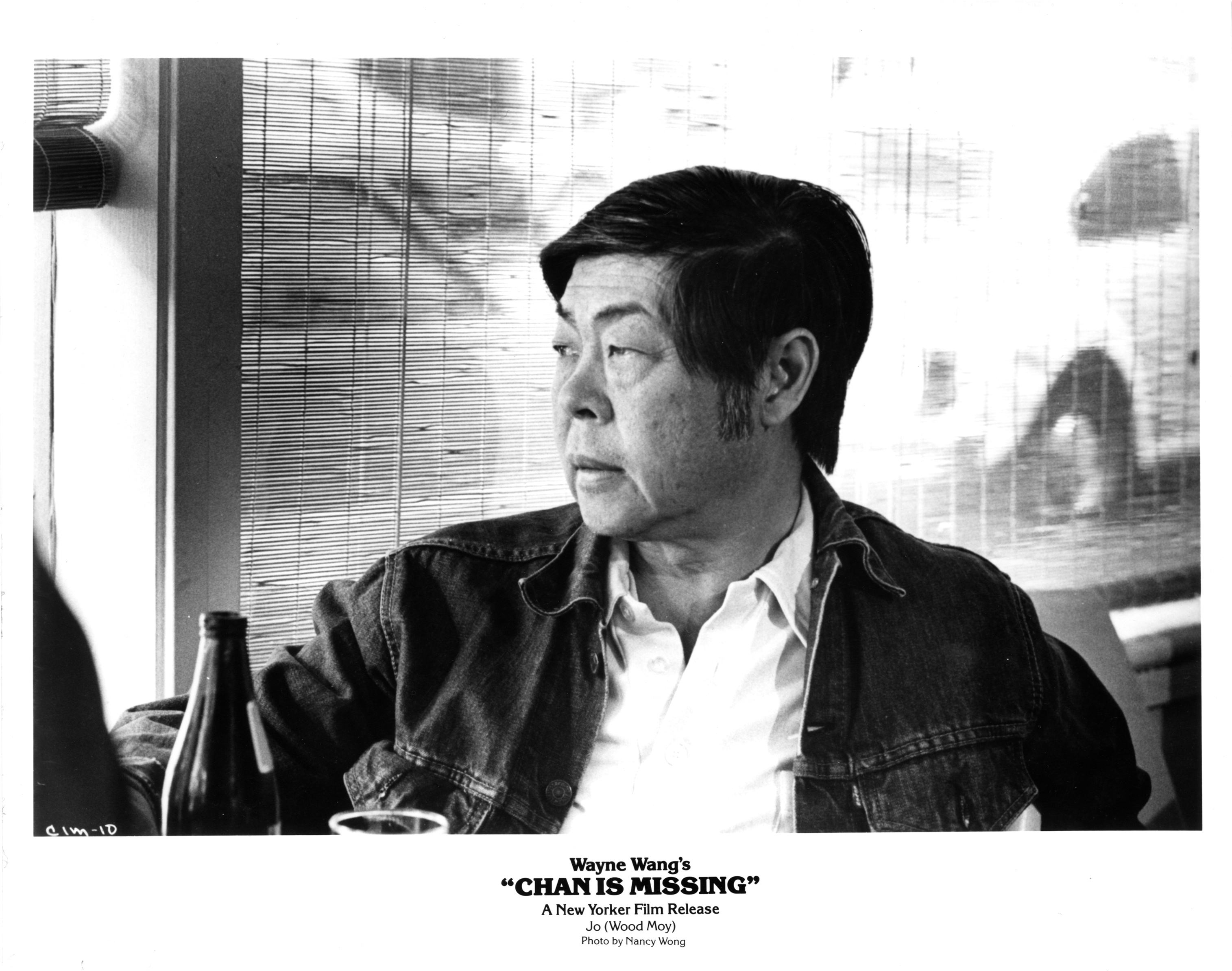
Moy in 1981

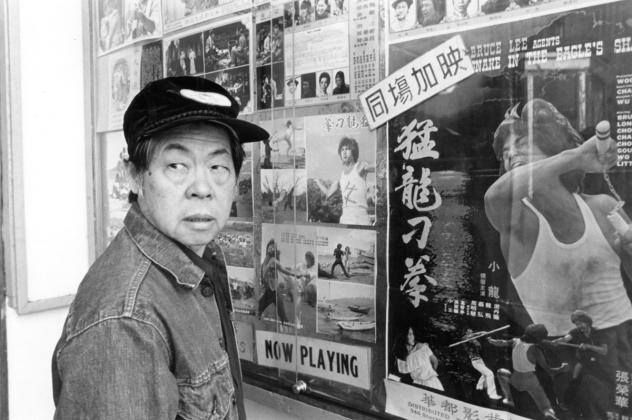
Moy, 1981

Wood Moy (10 June 1918 – 8 November 2017) was an American film and theater actor from New York City. He developed an interest in acting while attending St. John's University, Shanghai. He was an early member of the Asian American Theater Company in San Francisco. He is best known for a lead role in Chan Is Missing, the debut film by Wayne Wang.

In 1972, Mr. Moy was the first to join the Asian American Theatre Training Program led by Frank Chin at the American Conservatory Theater. In 1983, Moy wrote the play "Lo Foo and the Missing Ming Artifact" for the Asian American Theater Company. In "Lo Foo," Moy plays detective Charlie Chan, lured out of retirement to pursue a stolen artifact. In 1994, Moy was cast in the Berkeley and Los Angeles theatrical adaptations of Maxine Hong Kingston's novel, The Woman Warrior, as Ah Goong. Moy also appeared in The Wash at Eureka Theatre and Pay the Chinaman at the Zephyr Theatre. He died in November 2017 at the age of 99.

== Filmography ==
Year	Title	Role	Notes
1978	Invasion of the Body Snatchers	Mr. Tong	
1982	Chan Is Missing	Jo	
1986	Howard the Duck	Chef	
1991	Class Action	Mr. Minh	
1992	Final Analysis	Dr. Lee	(final film role)
