= Joan Copeland =

American actress (1922–2022)

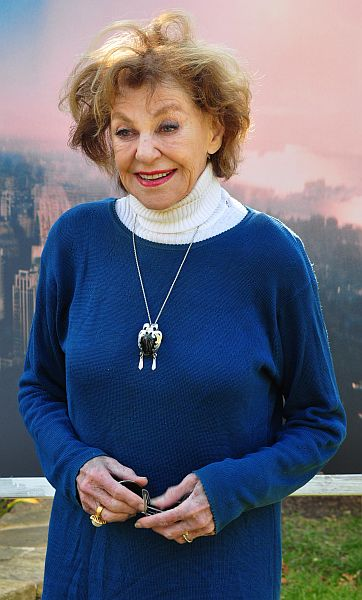
- Copeland in 2011
- Born: Joan Maxine Miller; June 1, 1922; New York City, U.S.
- Died: January 4, 2022 (aged 99); New York City, U.S.
- Occupation: Actress
- Years active: 1945–2011
- Spouse: George J. Kupchik (m. 1946; died 1989)
- Children: 1
- Relatives: Arthur Miller (brother); Rebecca Miller (niece)

Joan Maxine Kupchik (née Miller; June 1, 1922 – January 4, 2022), known professionally as Joan Copeland, was an American actress. She was the younger sister of playwright Arthur Miller. She began her career during the mid-1940s, appearing in theatre in New York City, where, shortly thereafter, she would become one of the first members admitted to the newly formed Actors Studio. She moved into television and film during the 1950s while still maintaining an active stage career. She is best known for her performances in the 1977 Broadway revival of Pal Joey and her award-winning performance in the 1981 play The American Clock. She also played a number of prominent roles on various soap operas throughout her career, including Andrea Whiting on Search for Tomorrow and Gwendolyn Lord Abbott on One Life to Live. She voiced Tanana in Brother Bear.

== Early years ==
Joan Maxine Miller was born to a middle-class Jewish family in New York City. Her father, Isidore, was a woman's clothes manufacturer, and her mother, Augusta (née Barnett), was a schoolteacher and a housewife. Her family was of Polish-Jewish origins. She was the younger sister of Kermit Miller and playwright Arthur Miller and was briefly sister-in-law to Marilyn Monroe, with whom she shared a birthday.

She began seriously studying piano when she was 8 years old and for a time considered a career as a concert pianist. Eventually, after listening to herself, she said, "'You'll never make it as a concert artist,' I told myself. So I gave up that dream."

== Career ==
When she decided to go into show business she chose to change her last name ("I did not want to trade on my brother's name.") Thinking that Kupchik would not be a good stage name, she picked Copeland out of a telephone book.

Copeland began her career in the theatre, making her professional debut as Juliet in William Shakespeare's Romeo and Juliet at the Brooklyn Academy of Music in 1945. She made her Broadway debut as Nadine in the original 1948 production of Bessie Breuer's Sundown Beach. Thereafter she maintained an active career in the theatre. Her other Broadway credits include Detective Story (1949), Not for Children (1951), The Diary of Anne Frank (1955), Handful of Fire (1958), standby for Vivien Leigh in Tovarich (1963), Something More! (1964), standby for Kate Reid in The Price (1968), standby for Katharine Hepburn in Coco (1969), Two By Two (1970), Pal Joey (1976), Checking Out (1976), and The American Clock (1980), the latter of which was written by her brother Arthur Miller; Copeland won the 1981 Drama Desk Award for Outstanding Actress in a Play. In 2001, Copeland was set to play the role of Zelda in the Broadway mounting of Neil Simon's 45 Seconds from Broadway, however she left the production during rehearsals (replace by Rebecca Schull) and never actually performed in the production.

She worked extensively Off-Broadway in New York City. Her notable credits therein include Desdemona in Othello at the Equity Library Theatre (1946), Betty Shapiro in The Grass is Greener at the Downtown National Theatre (1955), Melanie in Conversation Piece at the Barbizon-Plaza Theatre (1957), Mrs. Erlynne in Delightful Season at the Gramercy Arts Theatre (1960), Leonie Frothingham in End of Summer at the Manhattan Theatre Club (1974), Lillian Hellman in Are You Now or Have You Ever Been at the Promenade Theatre (1978), the title role in Candida at the Roundabout Theatre (1979), Tasha Blumberg in Isn't It Romantic? at the Playwrights Horizons (1983), Mrs. Thompson in Hunting Cockroaches at the Manhattan Theatre Club (1987), Rose Brill in The Rose Quartet at the Circle Repertory Theatre (1991), Aida Gianelli in Over the River and Through the Woods at the John Houseman Theatre (1998), Nelly Fell in The Torch-Bearers at the Greenwich House Theatre (2000), and as part of a rotating cast in Wit & Wisdom at the Arclight Theatre (2003). She won an Obie Award in 1991 for her portrayal of Eva Adler in The American Plan at the Manhattan Theatre Club.

Copeland began working in television in the early 1950s as a guest actress on such shows as Suspense and The Web and on the live telecast of O'Neill's play The Iceman Cometh in 1960. She appeared on numerous soap operas. She portrayed Andrea Whiting (Joanne's daughter, Patti's malevolent former mother in-law) on Search for Tomorrow, twin sisters Maggie and Kay Logan on Love of Life, and roles on The Edge of Night, How to Survive a Marriage, and As the World Turns. She also portrayed Gwendolyn Lord Abbott on One Life to Live from 1978–1979, and later returned to the series to play Selma Hanen in 1995. Between 1993 and 1997 she portrayed the recurring character of Judge Rebecca Stein on Law & Order. Her other television credits include guest appearances on The Patty Duke Show, Chicago Hope, ER, All in the Family, and Naked City.

Copeland made her first film appearance as Alice Marie in The Goddess (1958). Her film career was sporadic and her appearances were almost exclusively in prominent secondary roles. Her film credits include Middle of the Night (1959), Roseland (1977), It's My Turn (1980), A Little Sex (1982), Happy New Year (1987), The Laser Man (1988), Her Alibi (1989), Jungle 2 Jungle (1997), The Peacemaker (1997), The Object of My Affection (1998), The Adventures of Sebastian Cole (1998), The Audrey Hepburn Story (2000), The Last Request (2006), and The Private Lives of Pippa Lee (2009). She also voiced Tanana in Disney's Brother Bear (2003).

== Personal life and death ==
Copeland was married to George J. Kupchik, an engineer, from 1946 until his death in 1989. She had a son named Eric with him. She died at her home in Manhattan on January 4, 2022, at the age of 99. (Another source quotes Copeland about her husband: "He is a bacteriologist."

== Filmography ==
Year	Title	Role	Notes
1958	The Goddess	Alice Marie	
1959	Middle of the Night	Lillian Englander	
1977	Roseland	Pauline	"The Hustle"
1980	It's My Turn	Rita	
1982	A Little Sex	Mrs. Harrison	
1987	Happy New Year	Sunny Felix	
1988	The Laser Man	Ruth Weiss	
1989	Her Alibi	Audrey	
1997	Jungle 2 Jungle	Mrs. Prelot	
1997	The Peacemaker	Senator Bevens	
1998	The Object of My Affection	Madame Reynolds	
1998	The Adventures of Sebastian Cole	Grandma Cole	
2003	Brother Bear	Tanana	Voice
2004	Koda's Outtakes	Tanana	Video short (Uncredited)
2006	The Last Request	Alice Rudolf	
2009	The Private Lives of Pippa Lee	Piano player	
2011	Love Is Like Life But Longer	Old nun	Short film (final film role)
