= A Great Wall =

1986 film by Peter Wang

- Theatrical release poster
- Simplified Chinese: 北京故事
- Literal meaning: Beijing Story
- Hanyu Pinyin: Běijīng gùshì
- Directed by: Peter Wang
- Written by: Shirley Sun; Peter Wang
- Starring: Peter Wang; Sharon Iwai; Kelvin Han Yee; Li Qinqin; Wang Xiao; Hu Xiaoguang; Shen Guanguan
- Cinematography: Robert Primes; Peter Stein
- Edited by: Grahame Weinbren
- Music by: Ge Ganru; David Liang
- Distributed by: Orion Classics
- Release date: May 30, 1986
- Running time: 97 minutes
- Country: United States
- Languages: English; Mandarin

A Great Wall (Chinese: 北京故事; lit. 'Beijing Story') is a 1986 comedy-drama film written and directed by and starring Peter Wang. It was the first American feature film shot in the People's Republic of China and was Kelvin Han Yee's first film.

== Plot ==
When a Silicon Valley Chinese American executive goes back to his homeland of China for the first time in 30 years, he and his family encounter many culture clashes between the lives that they lead in the United States and the lives of their relatives in China. The finale of the movie includes an exciting table tennis match involving the Chinese-American son played by Kelvin Han Yee.

== Cast ==
- Peter Wang as Leo Fang
- Kelvin Han Yee as Paul Fang
- Li Qinqin as Chao Lili
- Shen Guanglan as Mrs. Chao
- Hu Xiaoguang as Mr. Chao
- Wang Xiao as Liu Yida
- Sharon Iwai as Grace Fang
- Xiu Jian as Yu

== Reception ==
The film was met with critical acclaim. The film has a score of 60% from Rotten Tomatoes based on ten reviews.

Roger Ebert from the Chicago-Sun Times awarded the film three out of four, and wrote, "A Great Wall is a human comedy about a Chinese-American family that goes to visit relatives in Peking, and within that simple premise are so many inspirations that the movie is interesting even when it's just looking at things", and went on to say "The chief pleasure of A Great Wall is its observation of the different attitudes toward the daily process of living in China and the United States."
