= Media guide =

Sports record book for use by the press

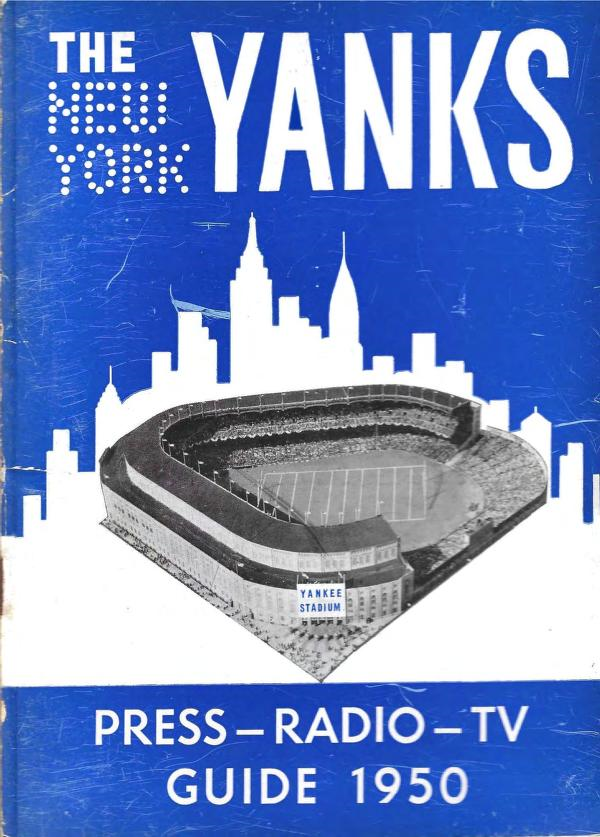
Media guide for the 1950 New York Yanks

A media guide, historically also known as a dope book, is a sports-related press kit, distributed as a book or binder, and published by sports teams before the start of the sporting season. It features information relating to the team players, history, statistical records and other similar items. Media guides are usually distributed to sports journalists to assist in their broadcasting of the team game.

While generally not sold in retail stores, media guides for professional sports teams are often available in their online stores or home web sites, along with being sold in physical form to the game attending public with game programs at in-stadium stands. Many major college and university sport media guides are available in PDF or other electronic formats for free on their home web sites. Following the end of the season, the printed media guides are often discarded or given to fans of the team.

== History ==
Press guides – later known as media guides – have existed since at least the 1930s and provide one of the few detailed sources of comprehensive historical athletic data before the Department of Education and National Collegiate Athletic Association requirements of the 1980s.

An older term for a similar type of publication is "dope book". According to Cassell's Dictionary of Slang, the term originated in the 19th century and refers to an information book on any subject, but usually on horse racing.

== See also ==
- Press kit
