= Laureen Chew =

American academic and actress

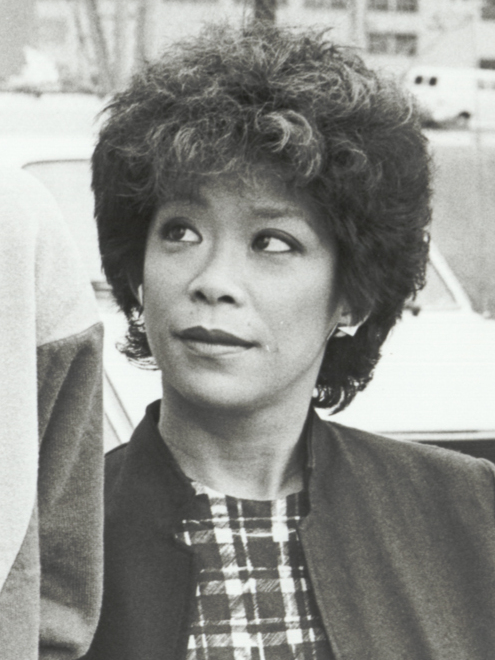
- Chew in 1983 shooting Dim Sum: A Little Bit of Heart
- Born: 1948 (age 77–78); Chinatown, San Francisco
- Title: Professor Emerita

Academic background
- Education: San Francisco State University (BA, MA); University of the Pacific (Ed.D.)

Academic work
- Discipline: Asian American studies
- Website: aas.sfsu.edu/laureen-chew

Laureen Chew (born 1948) is an American academic and actress. She is Professor Emerita of Asian American studies at San Francisco State University. She acted in two Wayne Wang films in the 1980s, both of which were shot in San Francisco.

== Early life and education ==
Chew was born and raised in Chinatown, San Francisco in 1948. She grew up around mostly other Chinese children. Her parents owned a laundry shop. Chew attended a Catholic high school.

Chew was a part of the Third World Liberation Front and helped organized the Third World Liberation Front strikes of 1968 at San Francisco State University. She was arrested and jailed for 20 days for misdemeanor charges of disturbing the peace, illegal assembly and failing to disperse. At the end of the protest, San Francisco State established its College of Ethnic Studies.

Chew graduated from San Francisco State University with a BA in Chinese and a MA in Elementary Education. She received her EdD from the University of the Pacific.

== Career ==
Chew is a former elementary school teacher within the public education system.

Chew's first film credit was on Wayne Wang's Chan Is Missing (1982). Her second credit was on Wang's Dim Sum: A Little Bit of Heart (1985). Much of the film was shot in Chew's home, with her actual mother acting as her character's mother in the film.

Chew was the Elementary Education Department Chair 2001 to 2006. Chew was the Associate Dean of the College of Ethnic Studies from 2006 to 2012.

== Filmography ==
Year	Title	Role	Notes
1982	Chan Is Missing	Amy	
1985	Dim Sum: A Little Bit of Heart	Geraldine Tam	
