= Marc Hayashi =

American actor

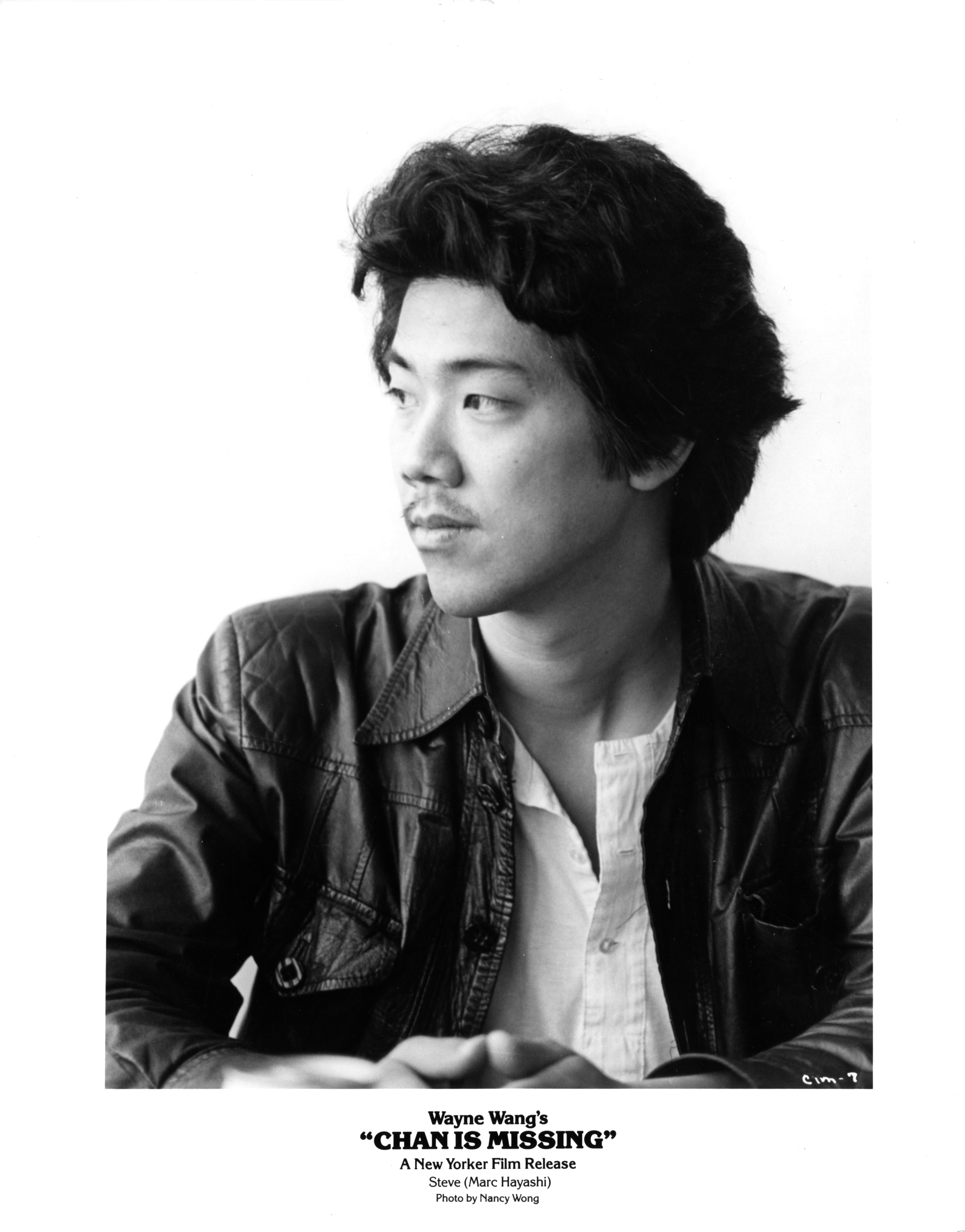
- Hayashi in San Francisco, California, 1982
- Occupation: Actor
- Years active: 1976-1993

Marc Hayashi (born 1955) is an American actor and director. He was an early member of the Asian American Theater Company.

== Selected filmography ==
Year	Title	Role
1982	Chan Is Missing	Steve
1984	Angel	Young Cop
1986	The Karate Kid Part II	Taro
1987	White of the Eye	Stu
1988	The Laser Man	Arthur Weiss
