= Dim Sum: A Little Bit of Heart =

1985 American comedy film by Wayne Wang

- Theatrical release poster
- Directed by: Wayne Wang
- Written by: Terrel Seltzer
- Produced by: Tom Sternberg; Wayne Wang; Danny Yung
- Starring: Laureen Chew; Kim Chew; Victor Wong; Ida F. O. Chung; Cora Miao; Joan Chen; Amy Hill
- Cinematography: Michael Chin
- Edited by: Ralph Wikke
- Music by: Todd Boekelheide
- Production companies: CIM; Project A Partnership
- Distributed by: Orion Classics
- Release date: August 9, 1985 (U.S.)
- Running time: 88 minutes
- Country: United States
- Languages: English, Cantonese

Dim Sum: A Little Bit of Heart is a 1985 American drama film directed by Wayne Wang and starring Laureen Chew, Kim Chew, Victor Wong, Ida F. O. Chung, Cora Miao, Amy Hill, and Joan Chen. It was nominated for the BAFTA Award for Best Film Not in the English Language.

== Plot ==
A Chinese immigrant widow faces the New Year with apprehension after it was foretold that it would be the year she would die. All of the things she wants to do before she dies come into focus, including seeing her daughter married and visiting China one last time to pay her respects.

== Cast ==
- Laureen Chew as Geraldine Tam
- Kim Chew as Mrs. Tam
- Victor Wong as Uncle Tam
- Ida F.O. Chung as Auntie May
- Cora Miao as Julia
- John Nishio as Richard
- Amy Hill as Amy Tam
- Keith Choy as Kevin Tam
- Mary Chew as Old M.J. player
- Nora Lee as Old M.J. player
- Joan Chen as Young M.J. player
- Rita Yee as Young M.J. player
- George Woo as Bar patron
- Elsa Cruz Pearson as Eliza
- Helen Chew as Linda Tam
- Jarrett Chew as Baby Tam

== Critical reception ==
Dim Sum: A Little Bit of Heart was met with critical acclaim. The film has a rating of 90% on Rotten Tomatoes based on 10 reviews, with an average score of 6.9/10.

Roger Ebert of the Chicago Sun-Times awarded the film 3 out of 4 stars and wrote "What is remarkable is the way Wang deals with this complex set of emotions, in a movie that is essentially a comedy."

The film was released on DVD and Blu-ray by The Criterion Collection in August 2023.
