= Chan Is Missing =

1982 film by Wayne Wang

- Film poster
- Directed by: Wayne Wang
- Written by: Isaac Cronin; Terrel Seltzer; Wayne Wang
- Produced by: Wayne Wang
- Starring: Wood Moy; Marc Hayashi; Laureen Chew
- Cinematography: Michael Chin
- Edited by: Wayne Wang
- Music by: Robert Kikuchi-Yngojo
- Production company: Wayne Wang Productions
- Distributed by: New Yorker Films
- Release dates: April 24, 1982 (Museum of Modern Art); June 4, 1982 (U.S.)
- Running time: 76 minutes
- Languages: English; Cantonese; Mandarin
- Budget: $22,000
- Box office: $1.1 million

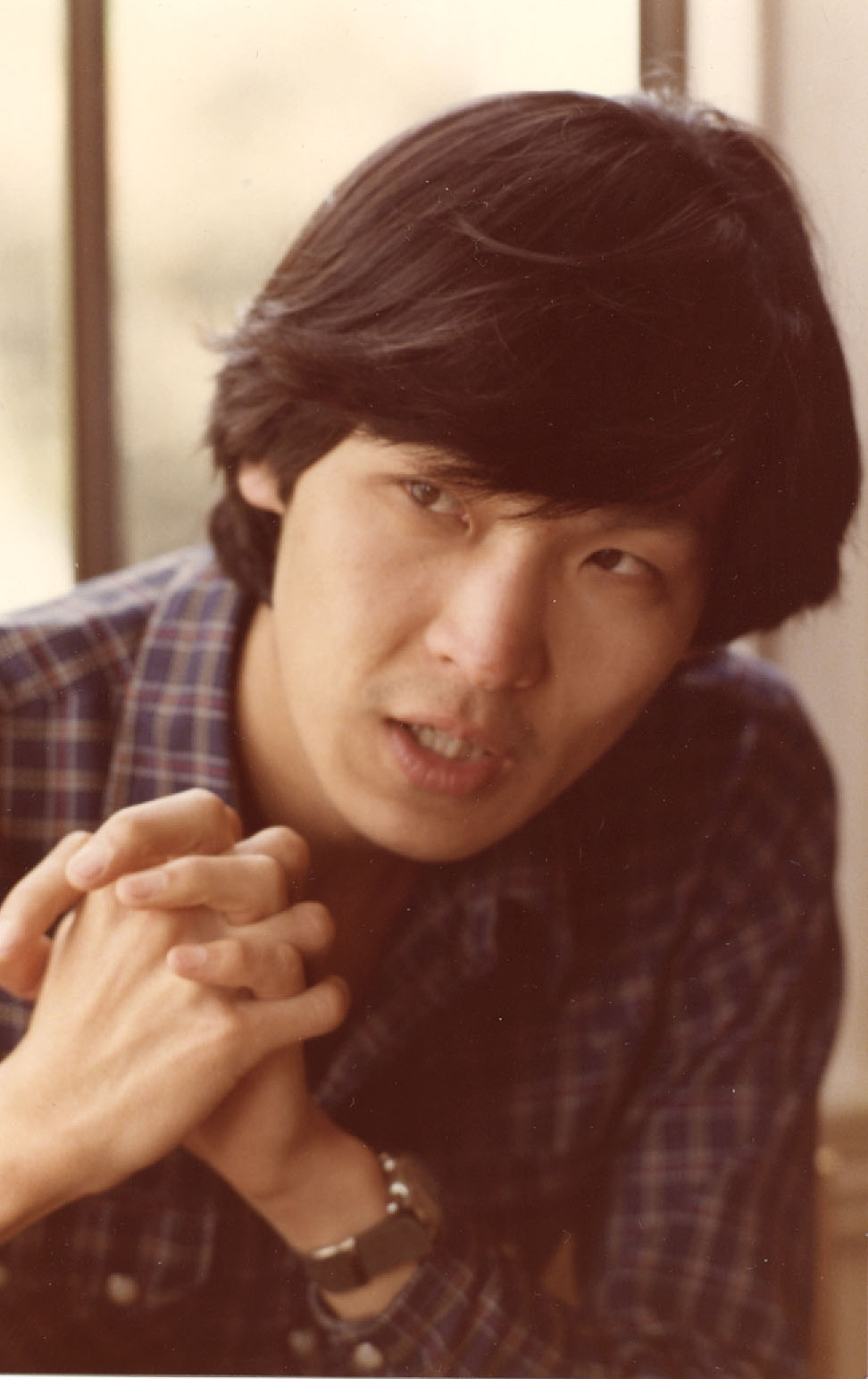
Film director Wayne Wang, 1980

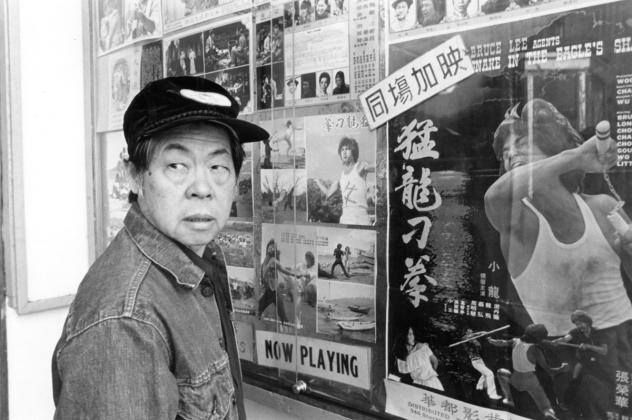
Actor Wood Moy, 1981

Chan Is Missing is a 1982 American independent comedy-drama film directed, co-written, produced and edited by Wayne Wang. It is his solo directorial debut. The film, which is shot in black-and-white, is plotted as a mystery with noir undertones, and its title is a play on the Charlie Chan film series, which focuses on a fictional Chinese immigrant detective in Honolulu. It is widely recognized as the first Asian-American feature narrative film to gain both theatrical distribution and critical acclaim outside of the Asian American community.

Chan Is Missing turns the Charlie Chan detective trope on its head by making "Chan" the missing person that the film's two protagonists, Jo (Wood Moy) and Steve (Marc Hayashi), search for. In the process of trying to locate Chan, a fractured, even contradictory portrait of him emerges, mirroring the complexities of the polyglot Chinese American community that Chan's character allegorizes.

In 1995, Chan Is Missing was selected for preservation in the United States National Film Registry by the Library of Congress as being "culturally, historically, or aesthetically significant".

== Plot ==
Jo is a taxi driver in Chinatown, San Francisco who, with his nephew Steve, is seeking to purchase a cab license. Jo's friend Chan Hung was the go-between for the transaction but has disappeared, taking Jo's money. The two men search for Chan by speaking with various Chinatown locals, each of whom has a different impression of Chan's personality and motivations. The portrait that is created is incomplete and, at times, contradictory.

As the mystery behind Chan's disappearance deepens, Jo becomes paranoid that Chan may be involved in the death of a man killed during a "flag-waving incident" between opposing supporters of the People's Republic of China (mainland China) and the Republic of China (Taiwan).

In the end, Chan remains missing but, through his daughter, returns Jo and Steve's money. Jo, holding a photo of Chan where his face is completely obscured, eventually accepts that Chan is an enigma, saying in a voiceover, "here's a picture of Chan Hung but I still can't see him."

== Cast ==
- Wood Moy as Jo
- Marc Hayashi as Steve
- Laureen Chew as Amy
- Peter Wang as Henry
- Presco Tabios as Presco
- Frankie Alarcon as Frankie
- Judi Nihei as Lawer
- Ellen Yeung as Mrs. Chan
- George Woo as George
- Emily Woo Yamasaki as Jenny
- Virginia Cerenio as Jenny's Friend
- Roy Chan as Mr. Lee
- Leong Pui Chee as Mr. Fong

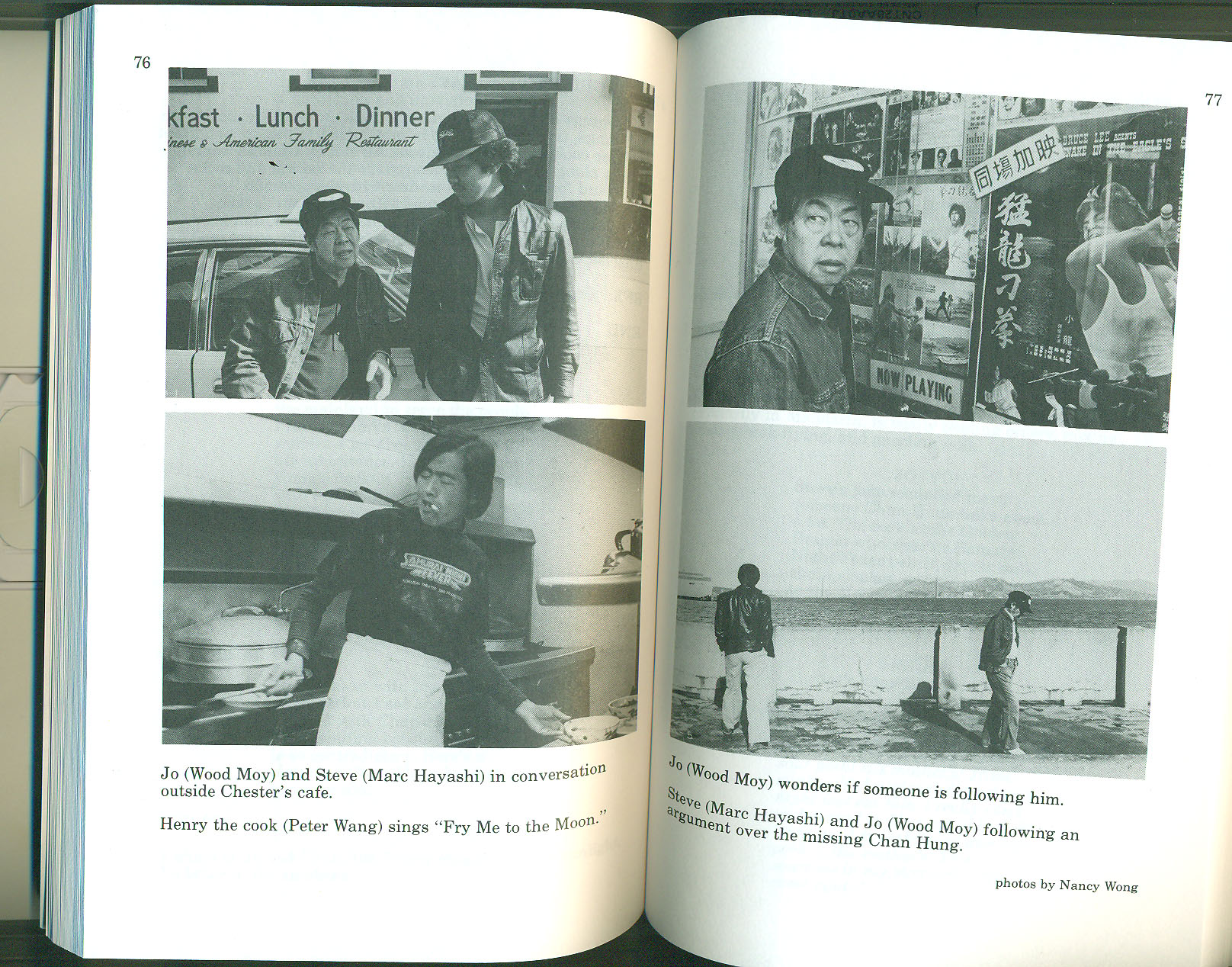
"Chan is Missing" still photos of actors Wood Moy (Jo), Marc Hayashi (Steve) and Peter Wang as Henry, the cook singing "Fry me to the Moon" in Wayne Wang's 1982 film..

== Themes and analysis ==
=== Chinese America and absence ===
The absence, ambiguity, and lack of definite character in the film are central themes in Chan Is Missing, and reflect how the film takes on the challenge of being an early Chinese/Asian American feature narrative. Chan Is Missing is able to use the absence of Chan to fill that space with a series of a broad and complicated portrait of San Francisco's Chinese American community. According to Diane Mei Lin Mark, who wrote the framing essay for the movie's published screenplay, "this very presentation of diversity among Chinese American characters in a film is a concept largely untested in American movies." The diversity is addressed in the film in at least two ways. First, there is Chan himself, who every character seems to have a different impression of. In a voiceover monologue at the end of the film, Jo explains, "Steve thinks that Chan Hung is slow-witted, but sly when it comes to money. Jenny thinks that her father is honest and trustworthy. Mrs. Chan thinks her husband is a failure because he isn't rich. Amy thinks he's a hard-headed political activist...Presco thinks he's an eccentric who likes mariachi music." Chan, it would seem, is meant to stand in for the Chinese American community as a whole.

Second, there is also an eclectic cast of other Chinese American characters that Steve and Jo encounter while looking for Chan. That includes Henry, the cook, who wears a Samurai Night Fever T-shirt while singing "Fry Me to the Moon" as he stir-fries in the kitchen. Both Chan and the film's characters suggest that Chinese America, is also impossible to easily summarize or characterize.

Film scholar Peter Feng suggests that Chan Is Missing can be understood via the metaphor of a doughnut: "Each character...holds a doughnut that contains the possibilities of for Chinese American identity in its center. Each of the film's characters only serve to widen that hole, thus widening the space for spectatorial subjectivity and by extension, Asian American subjectivity."

In a 2022 interview, Wang noted that his experiences with his older brother (who dealt with schizophrenia when living in America) played a distinct role of influence in the film, albeit from a distance.

=== Sound and language ===
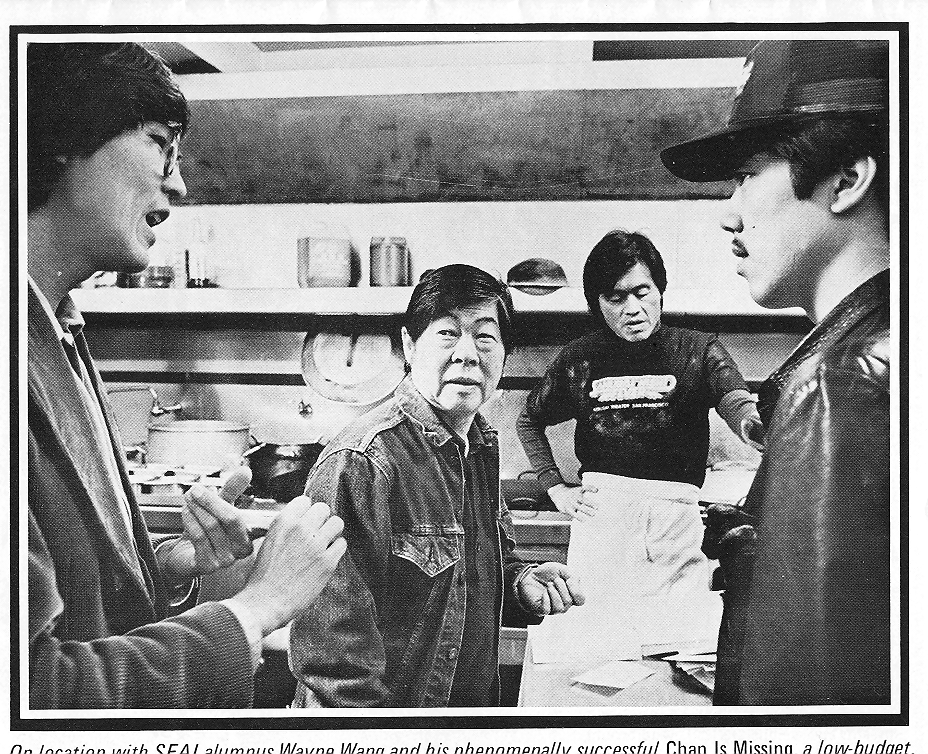
Wayne Wang discusses a scene with Wood Moy (Jo), Peter Wang (Henry) and Marc Hayashi (Steve).

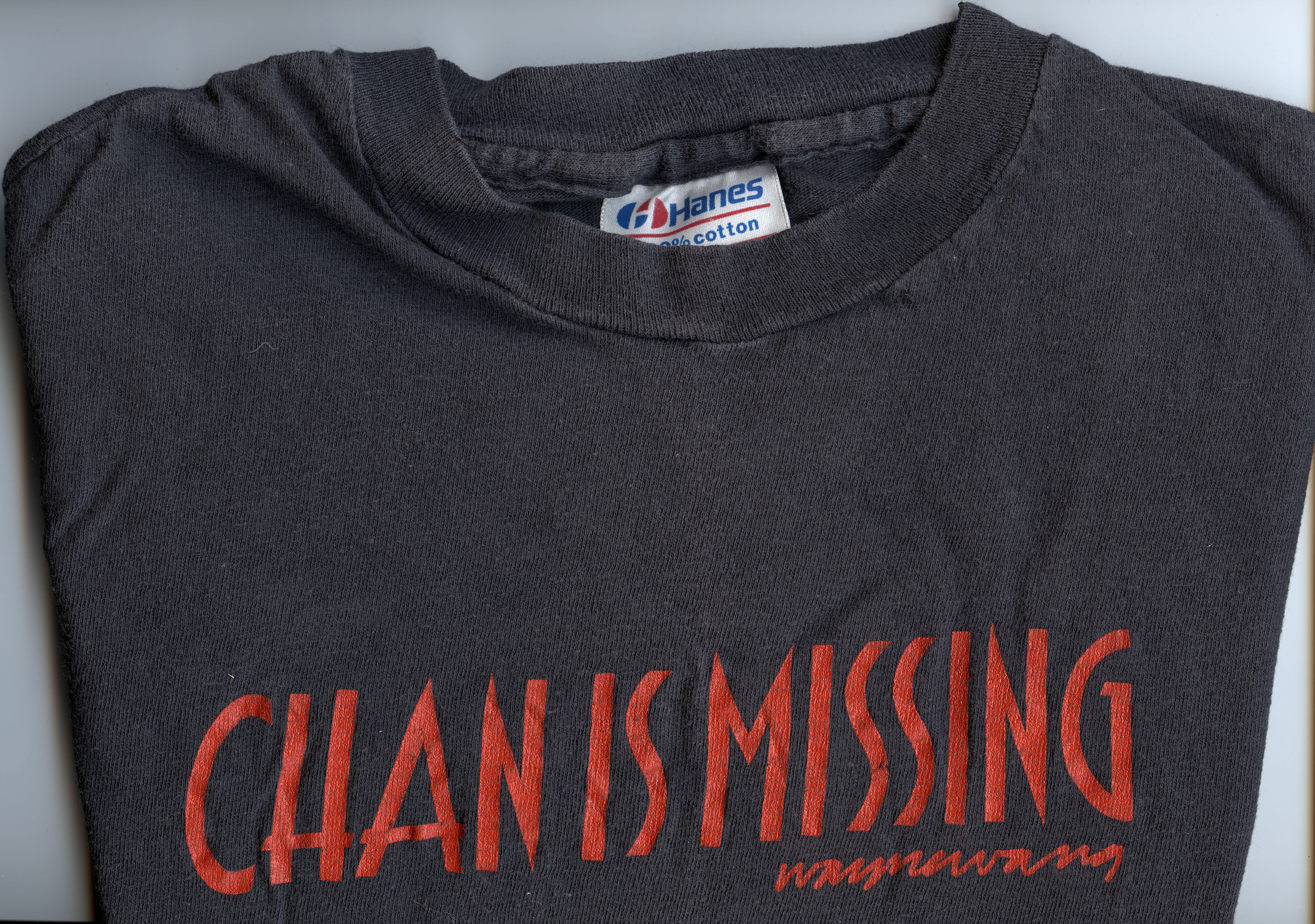
Cast/Crew t-shirt after making 1982 film.

Sound is strategically deployed throughout the film to enhance the atmosphere. As Jo begins to suspect that Chan might be involved in a murder cover-up, Jo's paranoia is echoed through an explicitly ominous score. There is also a scene where Jo and Steve go to the Manilatown Center, and during their conversation with a Center employee (Presco), the camera moves from the men to focusing on a loudspeaker and loud, ambient noise in the scene obscures their conversation. This un-joining of the speaker and subject leaves the viewer disoriented, which only adds to the general mystery of the film and its plot. A similar scene happens when Jo speaks with Chan's wife and her home and loud music is also used to obscure their conversation.

In the original theatrical version of Chan Is Missing, there are no subtitles provided for scenes where characters are either speaking in Mandarin or Cantonese. This is a common technique in Wang's film. As he told an interviewer regarding his 2008 film, A Thousand Years of Good Prayers, "I didn’t want subtitles because the audience should experience what those two are experiencing and not have any more information. Yet you could still understand. Sometimes the specifics of a language are not as important as the music of the language and the body language of the language.'

== Release ==
Wayne Wang's primary distribution goal was to have the film "play at festivals and college campuses", and as one of the first Asian American feature films, audience reactions to it spanned a spectrum of responses, sometimes dependent on the ethnicity of the viewer. One Chinese American viewer claimed the movie was written for a white audience because "…there being so much explaining, so many footnotes..." says Lem. Also according to Sterrit we see that "…its initial audience has not been an ethnic one, Chinese viewers are being wooed through newspaper ads…" Furthermore, the Asians were ‘wooed’ to watch the film by the white reviewers who reviewed the movie in the Asian press, therefore raising questions about whom the film catered to. Peter X Feng believes the success of this movie was through "the art-house audiences and brought the Asian Americans into the theaters." He also states that "reviews in the Asian American press often simply advertise the screenings; but the lengthier reviews usually refer to how white reviewers see Chinese Americans and how Asian American texts are received by non-Asian audiences."

Wang arranged for the film to be screened at the Museum of Modern Art (MoMA) where it premiered as part of the New Directors/New Films series on April 24, 1982.

== Critical reception ==
Chan is Missing is highly acclaimed. On Rotten Tomatoes, the film has an approval rating of 96% based on 49 reviews with the consensus: "An entertaining mystery that's also rich in setting and character detail, Chan is Missing suggests thrilling potential from director/co-writer Wayne Wang."

Roger Ebert of the Chicago Sun-Times awarded the film 3 out of 4 stars and wrote that the film is "whimsical treasure of a film that gives us a real feeling for the people of San Francisco's Chinatown" and it "has already become something of a legend because of the way it was filmed" that it demonstrates a "warm, low-key, affectionate and funny look at some real Chinese-Americans" and went to say "almost without realizing it, we are taken beyond the plot into the everyday lives of these people." He also awarded it a Special Jury Prize at the 1983 Sundance Film Festival.

Vincent Canby of The New York Times said in his review that "Chan Is Missing is not only an appreciation of a way of life that few of us know anything about; it's a revelation of a marvelous, completely secure new talent."

A review by Dennis Schwartz stated that, "It's breezy and warmly done, a low-key comedy that takes you into an ethnic group that has rarely been captured on film in such a revealing way. A true Indy film, and a delight."

The film won 'Best Experimental/Independent Film' at the 1982 Los Angeles Film Critics Association Awards.

== Preservation ==
In 1995, Chan Is Missing was selected for preservation in the United States National Film Registry by the Library of Congress as being "culturally, historically, or aesthetically significant".
