= Wayne Wang =

Hong Kong–born American film director (born 1949)

- Wang in 2026
- Born: January 12, 1949 (age 77); British Hong Kong
- Education: California College of the Arts
- Occupations: Director; producer; screenwriter
- Years active: 1975–present
- Spouse: Cora Miao

Chinese name
- Traditional Chinese: 王穎
- Simplified Chinese: 王颖
Transcriptions

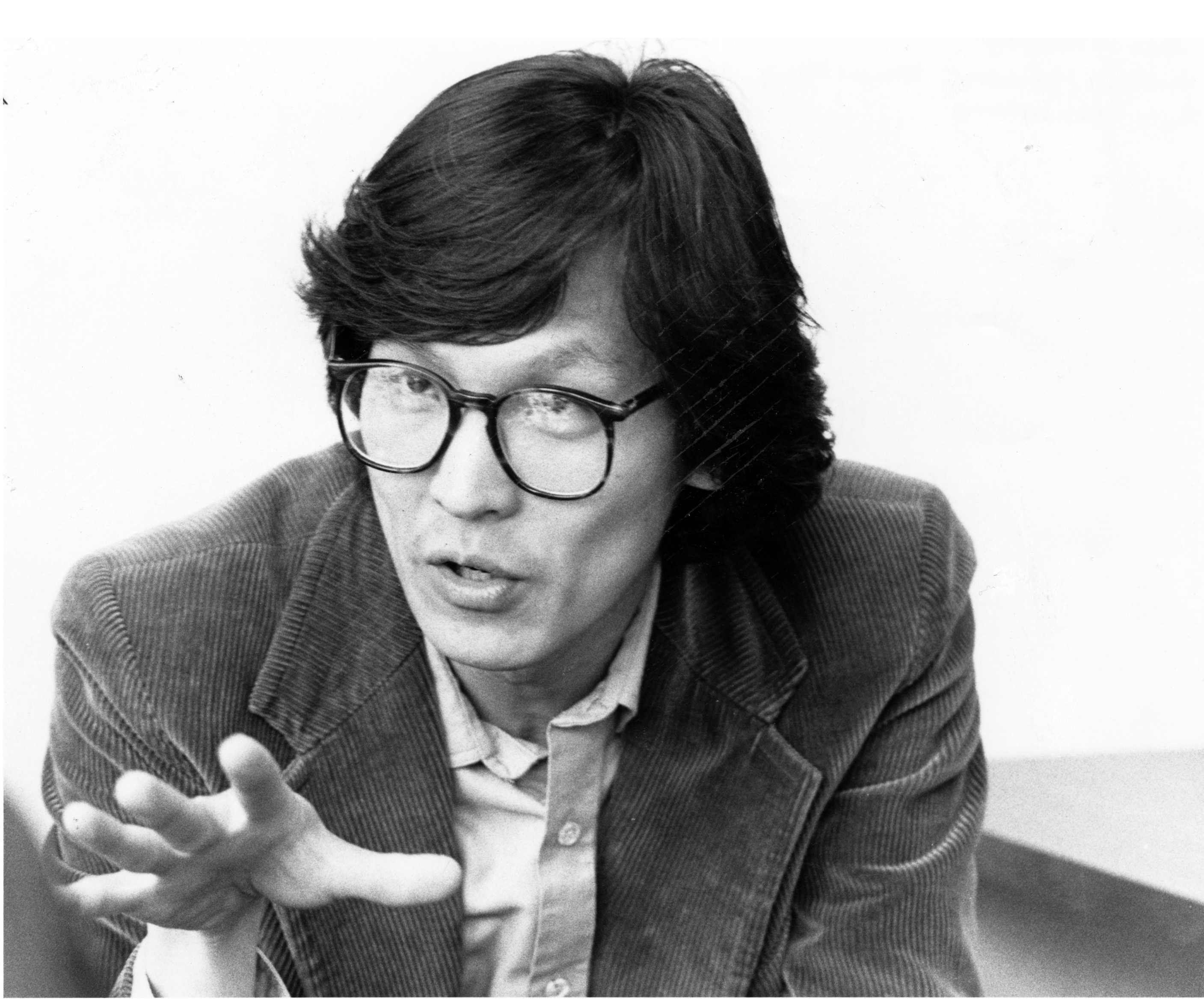
Wang in San Francisco, 1981

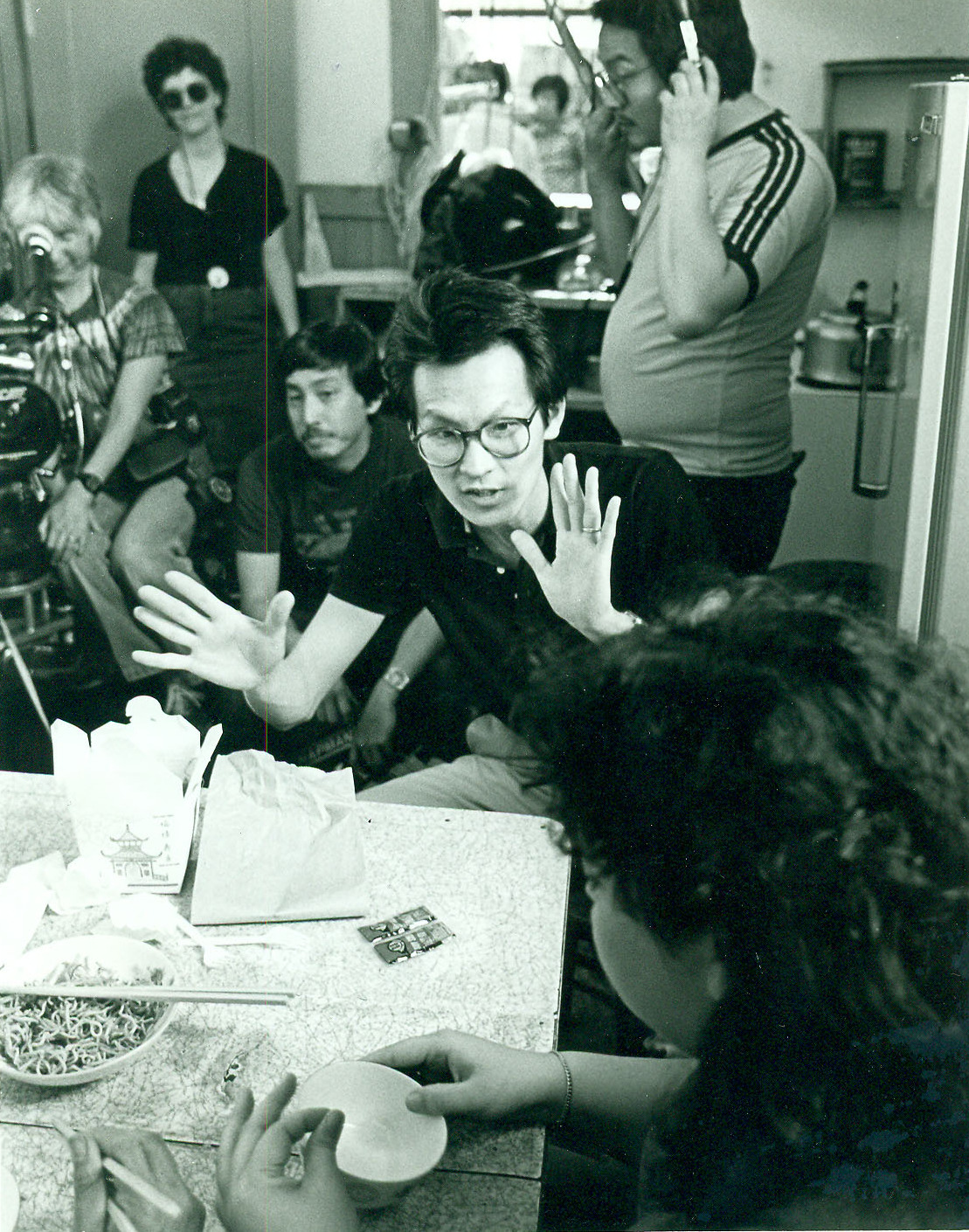
Preparing a scene from Dim Sum: A Little Bit of Heart

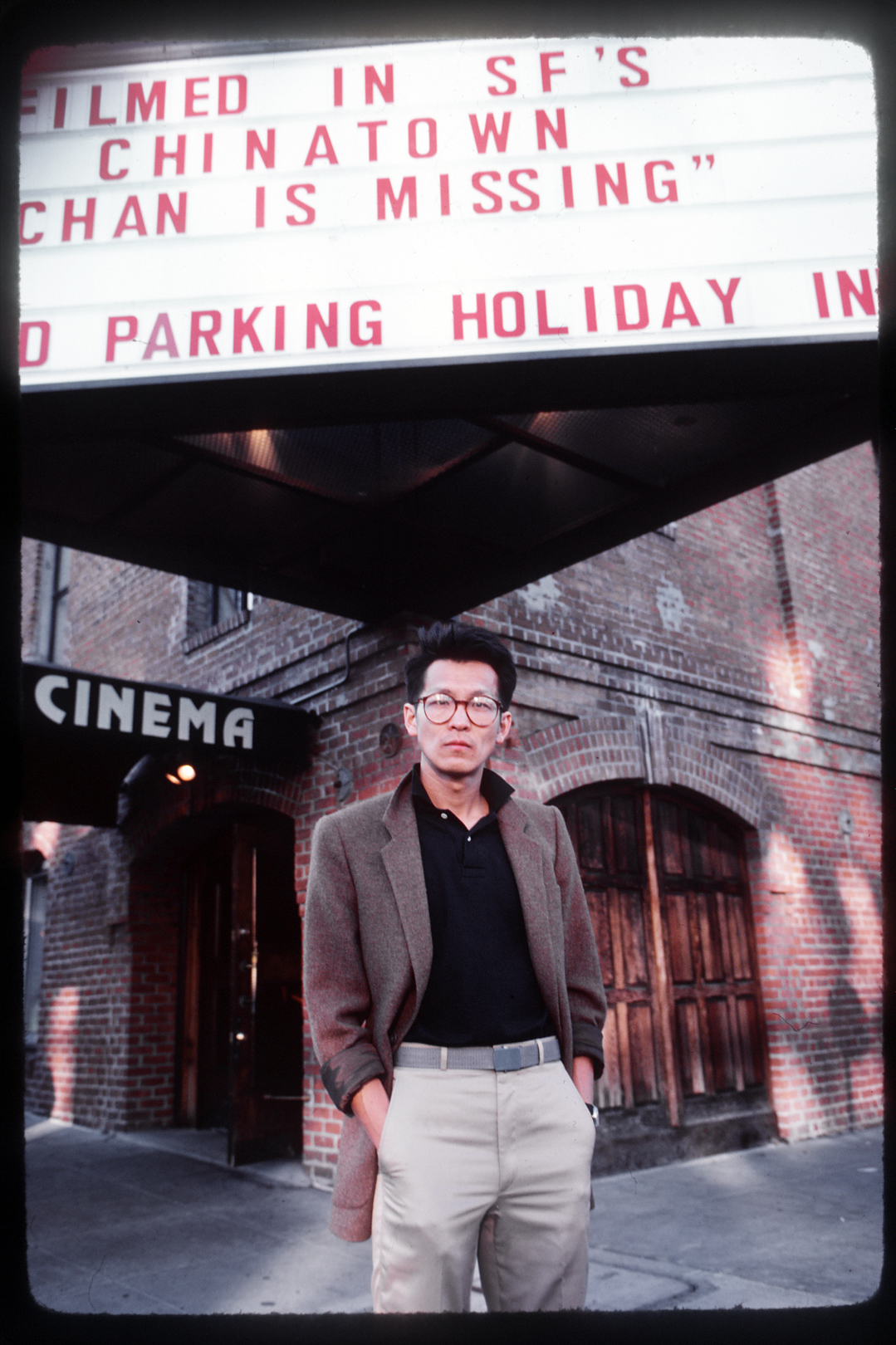
San Francisco's Cannery Cinema screens Chan Is Missing in 1982.

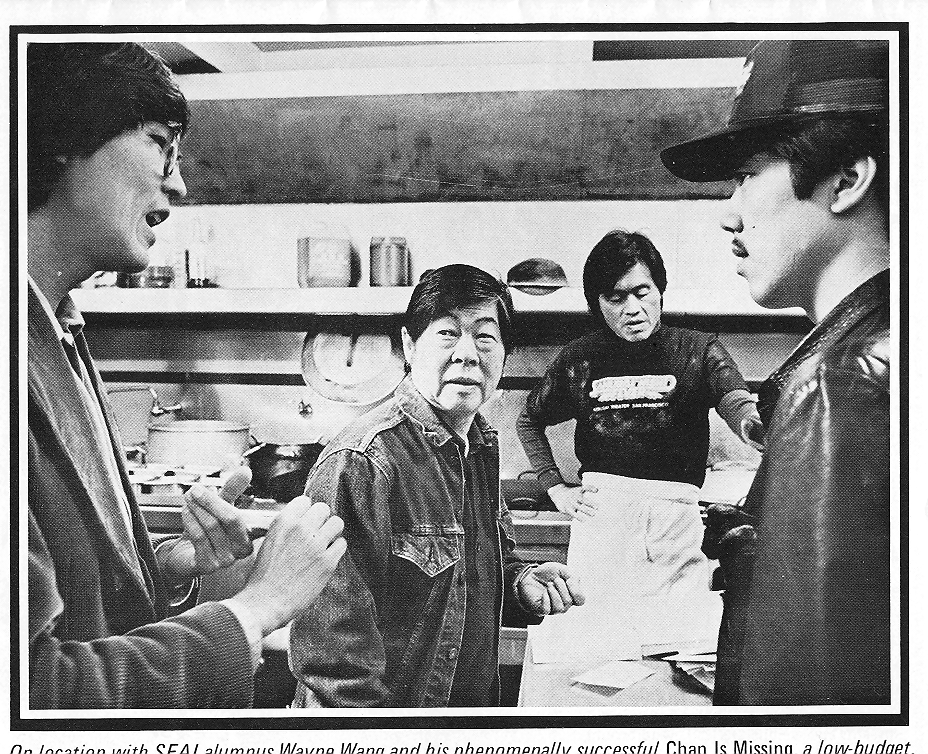
Wang with Wood Moy, Peter Wang and Marc Hayashi, 1981

Wayne Wang (traditional Chinese: 王穎; simplified Chinese: 王颖; pinyin: Wáng Yǐng; Jyutping: Wong4 Wing6; born January 12, 1949) is a Hong Kong-American film director, producer, and screenwriter. Considered a pioneer of Asian-American cinema, he was one of the first Chinese-American filmmakers to gain a major foothold in Hollywood. His films, often independently produced, deal with issues of contemporary Asian-American culture and domestic life.

His best known works include Dim Sum: A Little Bit of Heart (1985), Eat a Bowl of Tea (1989), the Amy Tan literary adaptation The Joy Luck Club (1993), Chinese Box (1997), and A Thousand Years of Good Prayers (2007). Other films include the Harvey Keitel and William Hurt–starring comedy Smoke (1995), the family film Because of Winn-Dixie (2005), the romantic comedies Maid in Manhattan (2002) and Last Holiday (2006), and the controversial erotic drama The Center of the World (2001).

He is the recipient of numerous accolades, including a Bodil Award, a Silver Bear, two Golden Shells, with BAFTA Award, Sundance Grand Jury, Golden Lion, and César Award nominations.

== Early life ==
Wang was born and raised in Hong Kong, and named after his father's favorite movie star, John Wayne. In the wake of the ongoing riots in Hong Kong, when he was 17, his parents arranged for him to move to the United States to study and prepare for medical school by going to Los Altos, California, where he went to Foothill College. Wang, however, soon put this plan aside when his "eyes were completely opened" by new experience. He turned to the arts, studying film and television at the California College of Arts and Crafts in Oakland.

After graduating from film school, Wang returned to Hong Kong and briefly worked on a popular soap opera at RTHK before being fired and returning to the United States. While in San Francisco, he supported himself by teaching English to new immigrants in Chinatown. The unique group of people he met teaching would inspire many elements of his film Chan Is Missing.

== Career ==
Wang has also collaborated with the author Paul Auster on the films Smoke (1995) and Anywhere but Here (1999), which deviated from his typical subject matter of Asian American life.

In 2001, Wang released his film The Center of the World without a MPAA rating because he refused to make cuts to the film's sexually explicit scenes. Wang has said the film's commercial and critical failure set his career back and led him to work on less personal films.

Wang has also worked within the mainstream Hollywood studio system on the films The Joy Luck Club (1993) and Maid in Manhattan (2002). Despite these being his some of his most financially successful films, Wang has described the experience as largely negative, and after the production of Last Holiday (2006) resolved to work exclusively on independent productions.

He won the Golden Shell at the San Sebastian Film Festival in September 2007 for A Thousand Years of Good Prayers.

In 2016, he won a Lifetime Achievement Award at the San Diego Asian Film Festival.

== Personal life ==
He is married to actress Cora Miao, a former Miss Hong Kong. They live in San Francisco and New York City.

== Legacy and impact ==
Wang is widely regarded as a pioneering figure in Asian-American cinema. His earlier works, such as Chan is Missing (1982), are often cited in film scholarship as foundational works that were instrumental in establishing a distinct Asian-American narrative in American filmmaking. The film's cinema-verité approach, nonprofessional actors, and its focus on the street level everyday life in San Francisco's Chinatown distinguished Wang as one of the first filmmakers to center the experiences of Chinese-Americans in a detailed and nuanced character driven depiction. Some scholars have argued that the film's influence warrant recognition beyond its value as an early Asian-American milestone, instead to consider it one of the most significant American films of its era, irrespective of its ethic categorization.

Wang's mainstream breakthrough came with The Joy Luck Club (1993), which he directed. It was only the second major American studio film to feature a large majority Asian cast, following Flower Drum Song (1961). While Flower Drum Song holds historical significance as an early major Hollywood production featuring a large Asian ensemble cast, some scholars and critics have noted that its influence on Asian-American cinema and storytelling was limited; the film offered little engagement with Asian and Asian-American identity, did little to alter industry and public attitudes towards Asians and Asian-Americans in Hollywood and the country, and did not lead to increased opportunities for Asian and Asian-American narratives.

By contrast, the Joy Luck Club marked a significant cultural shift in expectations about Asian and Asian-American representation in Hollywood as it presented complex Asian-American characters and family histories. Additionally, its commercial success demonstrated the viability and potential of Asian-American narratives in mainstream films. Furthermore, unlike Flower Drum Song whose crew was almost entirely non-Asian and instead white writers and crew, The Joy Luck Club had a significant number of Asian and Asian-Americans behind the camera. For example, it included an Asian-American writer, Amy Tan; costume designer, Lydia Tanji; and a Chinese-American Editor, Maysie Hoy. For these reasons, Wang's work has become a major reference point for later conversations and discussion of representation, paving a way for subsequent Asian-American narratives such as Crazy Rich Asians.

Filmmakers of the next generation, like the Crazy Rich Asians director, Jon M. Chu, have directly mentioned and cited Wayne Wang's work such as The Joy Luck Club as being a formative experience. He recalls that when he was a child, his parents took him to a Sunday matinee, and it was the first time he had seen households resembling his own depicted on the big screen. He and his family "went to dim sum afterwards and sat for three or four hours talking about the story and learning about our own parent's journey." While developing Crazy Rich Asians, he recognized that it carried a historical weight as the next major studio film to follow the path opened by The Joy Luck Club.

In recognition of Wang's achievements and impact, he has received several lifetime honors, including the 2016 Lifetime Achievement Award from the San Diego Asian Film Festival. His films continue to be felt and studied for their contributions to Asian and Asian-American representation on and behind the camera as well as to the evolution of American independent cinema.

== Filmography ==
Year	Title	Notes
1975	A Man, a Woman, and a Killer	Co-director with Rick Schmidt
1982	Chan Is Missing	
1985	Dim Sum: A Little Bit of Heart	
1987	Slam Dance	
1988	Dim Sum Take Out	Outtakes from Dim Sum: A Little Bit of Heart
1989	Eat a Bowl of Tea	
1989	Life Is Cheap... But Toilet Paper Is Expensive	
1992	Strangers	Segment "Small Sounds and Tilting Shadows"
1993	The Joy Luck Club	
1995	Smoke	
1995	Blue in the Face	Co-director with Paul Auster
1997	Chinese Box	
1999	Anywhere but Here	
2001	The Center of the World	
2002	Maid in Manhattan	
2005	Because of Winn-Dixie	
2006	Last Holiday	
2007	The Princess of Nebraska	
2007	A Thousand Years of Good Prayers	
2009	Chinatown Film Project	Film exhibition at Museum of Chinese in America; Segment: "Tuesday"
2011	Snow Flower and the Secret Fan	
2014	Soul of a Banquet	Documentary film
2016	While the Women Are Sleeping	
2019	Coming Home Again	
2026	Diary of a Mad Old Man	World premiere in Gala Presentations at the 2026 Toronto International Film Festival

== Awards and nominations ==
Year	Title	Notes
1982	Chan Is Missing	Los Angeles Film Critics Association Independent Film and Video Award; Nominated—Golden Montgolfiere
1985	Dim Sum: A Little Bit of Heart	Nominated—BAFTA Award for Best Foreign-Language Film; Nominated—Sundance Grand Jury Prize: Dramatic
1987	Slam Dance	Nominated—Deauville Critics Award
1999	Life Is Cheap... But Toilet Paper Is Expensive	Rotterdam KNF Award
1995	Smoke	Berlin Silver Bear; Silver Condor Award for Best Foreign Film; Bodil Award for Best American Film; Robert Award for Best Foreign Film; Nominated—Golden Berlin Bear; Nominated—César Award for Best Foreign Film; Nominated—David di Donatello for Best Foreign Film; Nominated—Nastro d'Argento for Best Foreign Director
1997	Chinese Box	Nominated—Golden Venice Lion; Nominated—Seminci Golden Spike
2007	A Thousand Years of Good Prayers	Golden Shell for Best Film; CEC Award for Best Film; SIGNIS Award
2011	Snow Flower and the Secret Fan	Golden Angel Award for Outstanding Film
2019	Coming Home Again	Nominated—Tallinn Jury Prize for Best Director; Nominated—Tallinn Grand Prize for Best Film
