= Scott James Wells =

American actor

- Born: July 4, 1961; Dayton, Ohio, U.S.
- Died: October 28, 2015 (aged 54); Dayton, Ohio, U.S.
- Occupation(s): Television, film actor
- Years active: 1975–1991

Scott James Wells (July 4, 1961 – October 28, 2015) was an American actor and model, primarily noted for playing the villain Lex Luthor during the first season of the television series Superboy.

== Early life ==
Scott James Wells was born on July 4, 1961, in Dayton, Ohio. He graduated from West Carrollton High School. Sometime afterwards, he moved to L.A, working as an actor, having appeared in Emergency! and Beauty and the Beast, and a model for fitness and fashion magazines. Besides acting on TV he could be seen in print ads for Calvin Klein and billboards for Coppertone. In 1988, he appeared in the music video "Anything For You" by Gloria Estefan.

== Superboy ==
In 1988, Wells was cast as Superboy's (arch-) enemy Lex Luthor. Playing a younger version of the famous character, he had four guest appearances on the show. After ratings were disappointing, the show's producer Ilya Salkind decided to change aspects of the series. As a consequence, Wells as well as John Haymes Newton (Superboy) were replaced beginning with Season 2. Sherman Howard was then cast as Lex Luthor. The change in appearance was explained due to Luthor having been scarred by a chemical accident which first caused his hair to fall out, then caused accelerated aging. Luthor then got plastic surgery to rectify the accident as well as become a doppelganger of an industrialist (also played by Sherman Howard), whom he murders to replace him and fool Superboy.

In 2006, Salkind explained Wells' absence on the DVD box set of "Superboy: The Complete First Season," due to him being in "rehab,"

== Later life and death ==
After his departure from the series in 1989, Scott Wells appeared in The Taking of Beverly Hills (1991). Subsequently to this film he retired from show business, with only one credited position as a stand-in in the movie Indecent Behavior III (1995). In 1998, Wells left Los Angeles to enroll in a drug & alcohol recovery program in Sacramento, CA.

Later in Life, Wells moved back to Dayton, OH.

Wells died on October 28, 2015, in Dayton, Ohio.
