= Betsy Russell =

American actress (born 1963)

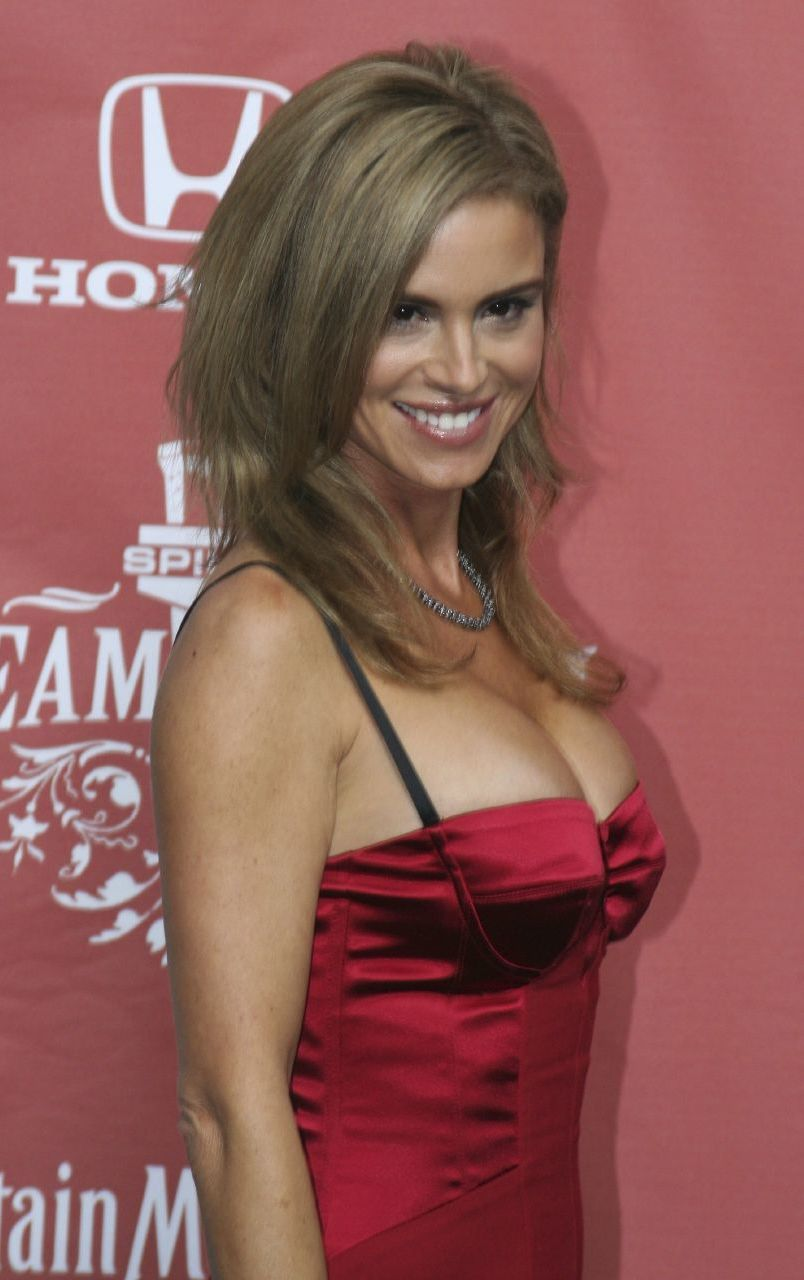
- Russell in 2007
- Born: Elizabeth Russell; September 6, 1963 (age 63); San Diego, California, U.S.
- Education: University of Santa Monica
- Occupations: Actress; producer
- Years active: 1982–present
- Spouse: Vincent Van Patten (m. 1989; div. 2001)
- Children: 2
- Father: Richard Russell
- Relatives: Max Lerner (maternal grandfather)
- Website: imbetsyrussell.com

Signature
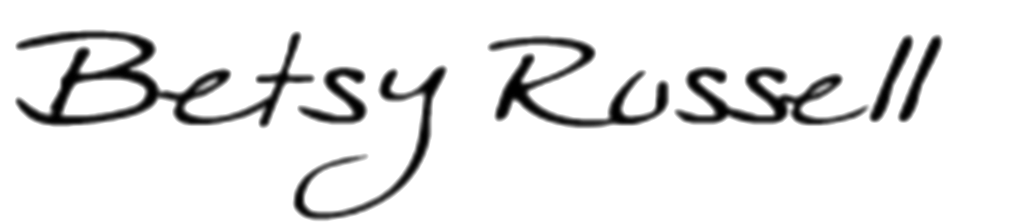

Betsy Russell (born Elizabeth Russell; September 6, 1963) is an American actress who is best known for her roles in Private School (1983), Tomboy (1985), and as Jill Tuck, one of the primary characters of the Saw film series from 2006 to 2010.

== Early life ==
Russell was born in San Diego, California, on September 6, 1963, the daughter of Constance (née Lerner) and Richard Lion Russell, a stock analyst. She is the granddaughter of the late journalist and educator Max Lerner. Her father and maternal grandfather were Jewish. Russell attended Mission Bay High School and graduated in 1981. While in high school, she appeared in a locally taped Pepsi commercial.

== Career ==
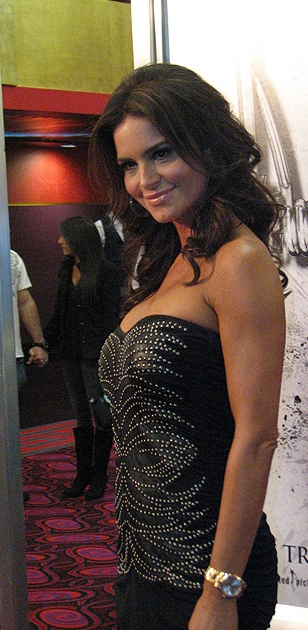
Russell at the Grauman's Chinese Theatre in 2010

Russell's first role was in the 1982 film Let's Do It!. That same year, she landed roles on T. J. Hooker, Family Ties, and The Powers of Matthew Star. In 1983, Russell's breakout role came as Jordan Leigh-Jensen in the sex comedy Private School. While shooting the action film Avenging Angel, she was offered to audition for the 1985 film Silverado but turned it down. She said in an interview, "Everything happens for a reason. I always believe my career would have been different had I done that part. I can't say if it would have been better or worse. I've had a great run."

Russell went on to star in a series of B movies in the 1980s, including the comedy Tomboy and the slasher film Cheerleader Camp. Russell also appeared on TV series such as The A-Team, Murder, She Wrote, 1st & Ten, and an episode of Superboy, which was a reunion with her Tomboy co-star Gerard Christopher. After 15 years of retirement from acting to focus on family, Russell appeared in a small role in Saw III playing John Kramer's ex-wife, Jill Tuck.

She went on to star in the sequels, Saw IV, Saw V, Saw VI, and Saw 3D. She played a role in the 2010 film Chain Letter, the SyFy film Mandrake, and My Trip Back to the Dark Side.

== Personal life ==
In August 1988, Russell became engaged to actor Vincent Van Patten and they married nine months later, on May 27, 1989, in North Hollywood. The wedding reception was at Van Patten's father's Sherman Oaks home. They have two sons and divorced in 2001. Russell was previously engaged to film producer Mark Burg. As of 2010, Russell resided in Malibu, California. She has completed a masters program in Spiritual Psychology at the University of Santa Monica and is a certified hypnotist and life coach.

== Credits ==
=== Film ===
List of films and roles
Year	Title	Role	Notes
1982	Let's Do It!	Kittie	
1983	Private School	Jordan Leigh-Jensen	
1985	Avenging Angel	Molly "Angel" Stewart	
1985	Tomboy	Tomasina 'Tommy' Boyd	
1985	Out of Control	Chrissie Baret	
1988	Cheerleader Camp	Alison Wentworth	
1989	Trapper County War	Lacey Luddigger	
1991	Camp Fear	Jamie	
1992	Delta Heat	Vicky Forbes	
1993	Amore!	Cheryl Schwartz	
1995	The Break	Candy	
2000	The Flunky	Candy	
2006	Saw III	Jill Tuck	Cameo
2007	Saw IV	Jill Tuck	
2008	Saw V	Jill Tuck	
2009	Saw VI	Jill Tuck	
2010	Chain Letter	Sergeant Hamill	
2010	Saw 3D	Jill Tuck	
2012	Lose Yourself	Destiny	Direct-to-video
2014	My Trip Back to the Dark Side	Destiny	
2014	Knock 'em Dead	Louanne the Maid / Laurie Grant	
2022	Bully High	Beth White	Also co-producer

=== Television ===
List of television appearances and roles
Year	Title	Role	Notes
1982	The Powers of Matthew Star	Dawn	Episode: "Jackal"
1982	T. J. Hooker	Teenager	Episode: "Second Chance"
1982	Family Ties	Girl	Episode: "Not with My Sister You Don't"
1984–1986	The A-Team	Tina; Adrian Prescott	Episode: "Bullets and Bikinis"; Episode: "Members Only"
1986	Murder, She Wrote	Doris Robinson	Episode: "Menace, Anyone?"
1986–1987	1st & Ten	Christy	Episode: "Yinessa's Interview"; Episode: "Easy Come, Easy Go; Episode: "The Big One"
1989	Roxanne: The Prize Pulitzer	Liza Pulitzer	Television film
1989	Superboy	Serene	Episode: "Superboy... Rest in Peace"
1995	Platypus Man	Becky	Episode "The Crush"
2010	Mandrake	Felicia	Television film
2013	First Class Fear	Gayle	Television film
2017	Born and Missing	Dr. Taylor	Television film
2018	Robot Chicken	Lori / Teenage Girl (voice)	Episode: "Your Mouth Is Hanging off Your Face"
