= List of Superboy episodes =

This is a list of Superboy episodes. The syndicated television series was renamed The Adventures of Superboy in its third season.

== Series overview ==
Season	Episodes	Originally released	
Season	Episodes	First released	Last released
1	26	October 8, 1988	May 27, 1989
2	26	October 7, 1989	May 19, 1990
3	26	October 6, 1990	May 25, 1991
4	22	October 6, 1991	May 17, 1992

== Episodes ==
=== Season 1 (1988–89) ===
No. overall	No. in season	Title	Directed by	Written by	Original release date
1	1	"The Jewel of Techacal"	Reza Badiyi	Fred Freiberger	October 8, 1988
Lana Lang's father, an archaeologist, comes to the university with what he thinks is a cursed relic. Lex Luthor then steals the jewel in order to sell it to the highest bidder. The cursed relic has the same effect as of kryptonite on Superboy.
2	2	"A Kind of Princess"	Reza S. Badiyi	S : Howard Dimsdale; T : Michael Morris	October 15, 1988
Clark falls for Sara Danner, a rich and somewhat spoiled student at Shuster, who happens to be the daughter of crime boss Matt Danner. Superboy saves Danner's life when a bomb is set off by members of a rival crime syndicate, headed by Mr. Casey. When Sara disappears from her 18th birthday party, it is revealed that Casey has kidnapped her. When Casey contacts Danner, Danner decides that his crime syndicate means more to him than his daughter's life. Superboy rescues Sara and stops Casey. Sara, feeling rejected by her father, decides to leave Shuster and Clark behind.
3	3	"Back to Oblivion"	Colin Chilvers	Fred Freiberger	October 22, 1988
TJ goes to a scrapyard to investigate strange things that have happened there. When he arrives, he is trapped in a crushing machine by the old man, Mr. Wagner, who owns the scrap yard. Superboy saves him from being crushed to death. Lana decides to visit Mr. Wagner to learn what's going on. Wagner holds her hostage believing that she is his granddaughter Lena. His mind travels back to the days of World War II, when he was in a Nazi concentration camp, as he tries to protect his "granddaughter" from the Nazis, who are actually TJ and Clark returning to check on Lana. Wagner uses the scrap yard machinery against them and seemingly kills Clark, but Clark, as Superboy, barely saves TJ from a trap and frees Lana from Mr. Wagner, who suffers a heart attack but survives and is finally free from the haunting memories of World War II.
4	4	"The Russian Exchange Student"	Reza S. Badiyi	Sava V. Finney & Vida Spears	October 29, 1988
When a scientist's formula to improve the efficiency of gasoline is nearly destroyed, a Russian exchange student named Natasha is accused of sabotaging the computer that the formula was stored on. Superboy steps in when a demonstration of the formula results in a powerful explosion. Again, Natasha is blamed. She is forced to leave the country within three days. Clark and TJ, who is infatuated with Natasha, investigate. TJ discovers that Professor Gordon's assistant Jeff is working for a gasoline company that doesn't want the formula to get out since it would cause gasoline prices to drop drastically. TJ is found and dropped from a window high above the street by security guards in the company and saved in the nick of time by Superboy. Meanwhile, Jeff starts a fire and tries to kill Natasha and Professor Gordon, but Superboy arrives in time to save them and capture Jeff. Natasha decides to leave the US to assist Gordon, who is moving his research to Russia.
5	5	"Countdown to Nowhere"	Colin Chilvers	Fred Freiberger	November 5, 1988
Superboy must intervene when crooks steal a laser weapon and plan to use it to destroy a launching space shuttle. The world first learns of the new hero, Superboy, when he rescues Lana Lang from kidnapper Roscoe Williams (Doug Barr).
6	6	"Bringing Down the House"	Colin Chilvers	Howard Dimsdale & Michael Morris	November 12, 1988
A rock star, Judd Faust, wants the Boardwalk and baseball amusement park and when the owner refuses to sell the park everyone in it is in danger. Bombs are detonated and sabotage is all around. When Lana falls in love with Judd she is in danger also. Judd takes her away one night and reveals his true nature to her. He puts her in a torture device and begins to try to pull her apart while he records her screams. Superboy arrives just in time to stop Judd and release Lana from the machine's grasp.
7	7	"The Beast and Beauty"	Jackie Cooper	S : Toby Martin; S/T : Bernard M. Kahn	November 19, 1988
A Superboy impersonator is robbing banks and jewelry stores to get a million dollars so he can marry Florida's beauty queen. The real Superboy is arrested for his acts and when the beauty queen, Jennifer Jenkins, refuses to marry the Superboy impostor, Hugo, she is kidnapped and the real Superboy is the only one who can save her.
8	8	"The Fixer"	Colin Chilvers	Alden Schwimmer	November 26, 1988
Lex Luthor is taking bets on Shuster's basketball team who are playing against Florida State University in their next game. He blackmails Shuster's star player into losing the game and Superboy takes over the job of the referee to stop Luthor and save Shuster from his scandal.
9	9	"The Alien Solution"	Colin Chilvers	Mike Carlin & Andrew Helfer	December 3, 1988
A strange cloud-like alien who can take over others' bodies comes to earth hoping to steal Superboy's body so he can add it to his collection of warriors. Knowing Superboy always comes to Lana's rescue, he puts her in danger and lures Superboy into the open. After Lana is almost killed by the alien's warrior body, Superboy agrees to do what the alien wants. He follows the alien to its ship, and destroys the alien's collection of warrior bodies. He then traps the alien in a canister, and hides the canister in a cryogenics lab on the college campus.
10	10	"Troubled Waters"	Reza Badiyi	Dick Robbins	December 10, 1988
A businessman wants to buy all the farms in the Smallville area during an agricultural depression. Jonathan Kent wants to find out why. Kenderson, the businessman, has something to hide and tries to kill Jonathan, but he is unsuccessful. Superboy, who is coming to visit because of the attempt to kill Jonathan, checks over the farmland and learns a river runs below it that could be of value. He now must stop Kenderson before he gets what he wants and kills Jonathan. Kenderson wants to blow up the community silo when Jonathan goes to show it to the bank's mortgage department manager. As the two pull up to the silo Kenderson's men attack and prepare the silo for destruction. As they prepare to destroy the silo, Superboy arrives and stops Kenderson once and for all.
11	11	"The Invisible People"	Jackie Cooper	Mark Evanier	January 21, 1989
A large group of homeless people are living in front of a beach club on a Florida beach. They were promised jobs by the wealthy beach club owner, who never gave them anything. The owner of the beach club, Gerald Manfred, is trying to sell his club, but to do so he must get rid of the homeless group. He sets fire to one of their tents, and tries every way possible to get rid of them. When TJ, Lana, and Clark get involved TJ is nearly killed and the leader of the homeless group, Damon, is kidnapped. Lana searches for him and is kidnapped herself. Now she and Damon are trapped in Manfred's hands, and only Superboy can save them. Manfred prepares to kill them in hopes that when they die, the homeless people will leave the beach, but before he can do anything, Superboy finds him and makes him agree to give all the homeless people jobs as he once promised he would.
12	12	"Kryptonite Kills"	Jackie Cooper	Michael Carlin & Andrew Helfer	January 28, 1989
A kryptonite meteor falls in Addis Ababa and is sent to Shuster for study. It turns up in one of Clark's classes, a class on minerals. There, Clark feels the pain of kryptonite for the first time. Lex Luthor learns of its value as an energy source and takes a piece of it. He uses it to power a machine that can knock out lights all over the city and allow him to loot stores and banks. When Superboy stops him, Luthor gives the rock to his girlfriend on a necklace. When a fire breaks out in Luthor's dorm during a date, Superboy attempts a rescue and is made powerless by the kryptonite. Luthor escapes the fire leaving his girlfriend there to die. He send Leo back in to get the necklace, and once the necklace is gone Superboy returns to normal and escapes to bring Luthor to justice. Professor Peterson then gives Superboy the kryptonite in a lead box and Superboy throws it into space. A lone piece of kryptonite still attached to the necklace flows into Capitol City's sewers.
13	13	"Revenge of the Alien: Part 1"	David Grossman	Andrew Helfer & Michael Carlin	February 4, 1989
The alien from "The Alien Solution" escapes after a thief steals the canister containing him. He wants revenge on Superboy for destroying his collection of warrior bodies. The alien possesses a policeman and stalks Superboy. Superboy accidentally kills the policeman the alien is possessing. When he tries to take over Superboy's body, the alien finds he cannot get in and possesses Jonathan Kent instead.
14	14	"Revenge of the Alien: Part 2"	David Kiwitt	Andrew Helfer & Michael Carlin	February 11, 1989
Now controlling Pa Kent, the alien makes his move to get revenge. He kidnaps Lana and holds her hostage on a rooftop near Shuster University. Clark sees his father on the news with Lana and realizes something is wrong. When Lieutenant Harris tells Superboy that the cryogenics lab was robbed the night before, Superboy realizes who he is dealing with. He finds Pa Kent, and tells the alien that he will allow it to enter his body as long as he lets Pa Kent go. The alien agrees and Superboy takes the alien to Professor Peterson's lab. After the alien enters his body, Superboy activates a kryptonite ray in the lab. The kryptonite begins to kill Superboy and the alien inside is in agony. Superboy realizes he is dying. Pa Kent helps him move into a cryogenic freezer. Inside, the alien exits Superboy's body not realizing where he is. Once he goes into the cold air, his gaseous body freezes and becomes solid. Then it breaks apart into hundreds of pieces. Pa Kent is cleared with the police department and Superboy survives his exposure to kryptonite.
15	15	"Stand Up and Get Knocked Down"	David Grossman	T : David Patrick Columbia; S/T : Toby Martin	February 18, 1989
TJ finds his friend Michael dead outside of the Bonkerz comedy club. TJ wants to find out what happened to him, so he goes to the club's amateur night. Before he goes on stage he discovers that the club owner, Dexter, killed Michael and is a drug dealer. He tells a waitress, Angel, to take TJ a coke loaded with a potent drug to kill him. Luckily, she does not use the entire vial, and TJ only becomes sick. Clark and TJ are taken by Dexter and tied up with Angel. Small patches, that are loaded with deadly drugs are attached to all three and Clark only has two minutes to act before TJ and angel will die. He breaks free and turns to Superboy, then removes the patches from TJ and Angel. TJ goes crazy. Dexter tries to run him down with his limo, but is stopped by Superboy.
16	16	"Meet Mr. Mxyzptlk"	Peter Kiwitt	Dennis O'Neil	February 25, 1989
Superboy is called on to help remove a totem pole from the ground so it can be studied. When he arrives the totem will not budge. Just as he finally gets it out of the ground, it vanishes. Then a strange little man appears claiming to be from the 5th dimension, naming himself Mxyzptlk. Superboy meets him and discovers that Mxy's magic can harm him just as it could anyone else. Mxy decides he wants to take Lana back with him. Using his magic, he impersonates Clark and tries to get together with Lana. When Lana resists Mxy's twisted version of Clark, Mxy uses his magic to make her want to come with him. She is preparing to leave with Mxy when TJ, Superboy, and a scientist discover that the totem held back magical spirits. Once the totem was moved, the doorway to our world was opened. They also learn that saying his name backward will cause Mxy to return to his own dimension for 90 days. Knowing this, Superboy gives Lana a going away speech that he will record on video tape. She begins to read and Mxy takes over. Not realizing what he is reading, Mxy reads his name backward aloud and vanishes, undoing everything he had done.
17	17	"Birdwoman of the Swamps"	Reza Badiyi	Bernard S. Kahn	March 4, 1989
When a bulldozer is turned over at a construction site TJ and Clark decide to investigate. Clark meets an old Indian woman who believes the birds turned over the bulldozer. Clark, as Superboy, moves to bulldozer to its original position and pays a visit to the Indian woman. She thinks he is the enemy since he turned the bulldozer back over. She says the construction of a home for the poor is destroying the forests and the wetlands. Mr. Hogan, who is the head of the construction project, orders the Indian woman killed. Superboy visits the woman again and she uses a strange spell on him. He collapses in pain, but he is able to weakly fly away from the woman. After he leaves, she is attacked and left unconscious near the swamp by two of Hogan's men. Clark and TJ head to the construction company. They discover Hogan is charging the city top dollar for materials and using low-cost materials that are not suitable for construction. Meanwhile, the Indian woman is nearly killed by an alligator, but is saved by Superboy. Superboy flies to the construction site and is buried under tons of gravel by Hogan's men. He escapes and traps Hogan so that the police can take him away. The Indian woman apologizes to Superboy and the construction project is put on hold.
18	18	"Terror from the Blue"	David Grossman	George Kirgo	March 11, 1989
A group of cops gone bad attempt to kill police lieutenant Zeke Harris and Lana witnesses the shooting. The "dirty" cops chase after her and she avoids them. She leaves a message for Clark at his dorm. She then takes up with an ex-hippie in his trailer outside of the city, but the dirty cops find her there and this time she cannot escape. Superboy finds the message on the answering machine and arrives just in time to save Lana from a horrible death at the hands of one of the dirty cops.
19	19	"War of the Species"	Peter Kiwitt	Steven L. Sears	March 18, 1989
The military has given funding to an artificial intelligence project. TJ, Clark, and Lana visit the project to get a story for the Shuster Herald. They discover a dangerous android and are narrowly saved from death by Superboy. TJ had taken pictures of the machine and the leader of the project took it, so TJ returns to the project to get more shots. He is captured so that the android can undergo a final test against Superboy. Superboy arrives to save him, and discovers that the android's creator has his own secret. He too is an android from another world who created the other android to be his killing machine, since he was programmed never to kill. He is badly damaged in Superboy's battle and a self-destruct program is initiated. Superboy flies him away as he explodes.
20	20	"Little Hercules"	David Grossman	Wayne A. Rice	April 15, 1989
Clark and TJ visit a young high-school genius named Billy Hercules (Joaquin Phoenix) who has been offered a scholarship by Shuster U. Clark befriends the boy, who he can relate to since both of them are different and out of place. After a field trip to a naval base, Billy breaks into the advanced computer system of a new navy submarine to impress a girl he likes and this activates a self-destruct mechanism that will go off in 30 minutes. Only Billy knows the codes to get access to the computer and stop the sub from exploding. Superboy flies him to the sub, and Billy gets cracking. Meanwhile, Superboy begins burning a hole through a 6-foot-thick (1.8 m) door, that is locked tight and armed with explosives, in order to get access to the missiles so he can deactivate them. Luckily, with seconds to spare, Billy disarms the security door and Superboy is able to break through and deactivate the missiles. Billy is returned home and in the end, impresses the girl after all.
21	21	"Mutant"	Joe Ravetz	Michael Morris	April 22, 1989
Clark witnesses the kidnapping of Professor Craig Lipcott, a famous nuclear scientist. As Superboy, he follows the kidnappers to a rooftop and sees them enter a strange ship just before he is attacked by a powerful ray that leaves him disoriented. When he looks up the ship is gone. Lipcott awakens inside the ship, which is actually a time machine, with two mutant men and a normal woman, Vora. The mutants want plutonium. They reveal that they are from the 24th century and that they need plutonium to fight their enemies since no more exists in their time. TJ and Clark begin to investigate the kidnapping. TJ is taken by the mutant time travelers. Vora is sent to find Superboy so he can help them break into the installation where the plutonium is stored. Vora reveals to Superboy that she herself is a mutant in her society since everyone else has been mutated by fallout over the years. Superboy agrees to help in order to save TJ and Lipcott. Superboy gets the plutonium and flees with it. When the mutants blast him, he reflects their laser beams back at them and captures them. Vora frees Lipcott and TJ. She then leaves, never to return, since the machine will never have enough power to time travel again.
22	22	"The Phantom of the Third Division"	David Nutter	Bernard M. Kahn	April 29, 1989
Jonathan Kent is being stalked by a man who he fought alongside in the Korean War. As Clark, Lana, and TJ come to Smallville for a visit, Mr. Kent is lured to the Smallville hospital and kidnapped by the man. He blames Mr. Kent for the torture he went through in a prisoner of war camp. He makes Mr. Kent go through an obstacle course like the one at the camp to torture him and make him feel the same pain he felt. Superboy must now be the one to save his father's life and end the madman's emotional pain. He succeeds in stopping the "phantom" and Pa Kent volunteers to return him to the sanitarium.
23	23	"Black Flamingo"	Chuck Martinez	S : Berta Dominguez D. T : Cary Bates	May 6, 1989
An attempted assassination of a senator leads Superboy to a mysterious nightclub. Superboy goes undercover in a punk nightclub where a terrorist called Snake-Man (Fernando Allende) is hypnotizing teenagers to turn them into killers.
24	24	"Hollywood"	David Nutter	Fred Freiberger	May 13, 1989
Professor Zugar (Doug McClure) invents a time machine and sends himself and Superboy back in time to Hollywood in the 1930s. Superboy meets a famous actress, Victoria Letour and discovers that she is being stalked by men who want to kill her. They eventually kidnap her and Superboy comes to her rescue. Meanwhile, the time machine must be repaired since a crucial part was damaged during the trip. Using her influence, Victoria gets the inventor to bring his miracle calculator, much larger than today's, to fix the machine. The professor fixes the machine and Superboy returns in time to be transported back to the present. When he arrives, he discovers that Victoria has left a large endowment to Shuster U and he attends the recently deceased Victoria's funeral with TJ and Lana.
25	25	"Succubus"	David Nutter	Cary Bates	May 20, 1989
A beautiful vampire-like creature seeks to drain Superboy of his life force and seduces TJ as part of her plot.
26	26	"Luthor Unleashed"	David Nutter	Stephen Lord	May 27, 1989
Luthor steals a powerful weapon developed by the army and prepares to sell it to weapon dealers. Later, while Luthor is working in the Shuster laboratory he causes an explosion and Superboy saves him by blowing the chemical fumes out of the building. The fumes kill Lex's hair and cause him to go bald and now Luthor's hatred for Superboy is greater than ever. He prepares to sell the weapon to anyone who can kill Superboy and three assassins try their best, but are defeated by Superboy. Meanwhile, Lex's hatred for Superboy has grown and led him to a change.

=== Season 2 (1989–90) ===
No. overall	No. in season	Title	Directed by	Written by	Original release date
27	1	"With This Ring, I Thee Kill"	David Nutter	Fred Freiberger	October 7, 1989
Lex Luthor, now heavily bandaged from his first fight with Superboy, has had extensive plastic surgery. He murders an industrialist who created a weapon called the "Superboy gun", then steals his identity. Lex kidnaps Lana, forcing her to marry him, and uses the weapon on Superboy, paralyzing him, possibly forever.
28	2	"Lex Luthor: Sentenced to Die!"	David Grossman	Fred Freiberger	October 14, 1989
Professor Peterson comes to Superboy's aid. The two believe that Superboy will, with time, be able to have full use of his legs and powers again. Meanwhile, Luthor's back in hiding, and with the help of a new assistant, taunts Superboy with his new bride. Superboy, still a recovering paraplegic, has to figure out a way to rescue Lana.
29	3	"Metallo"	David Grossman	Mike Carlin & Andrew Helfer	October 21, 1989
An escaped bank robber suffers a heart attack and is sent to a hospital. He murders the doctor caring for him and escapes. After suffering another heart attack, he crashes his stolen car. A mentally unstable scientist finds him and makes him into Metallo, giving him a kryptonite heart, making him more powerful than Superboy.
30	4	"Young Dracula"	David Nutter	Cary Bates & Ilya Salkind	October 28, 1989
Byron Shelly, a dhampir (half-vampire) escapes his father and becomes a doctor in a Capitol City hospital. Byron befriends Superboy and reveals that he has researched a serum which can temporarily suppress his vampiric tendencies and permit him limited exposure to solar radiation, as well as eliminating other vampiric problems such as seeing his own reflection. His father sends an older, more powerful vampire to bring him back, and Superboy and Lana are trapped in the middle of the battle.
31	5	"Nightmare Island"	David Nutter	Mark Jones	November 4, 1989
Andy, Clark and Lana are deserted on an island when Andy's motorboat sinks into the ocean. On the island Clark turns into Superboy and is stripped of his powers by a dwarf-like alien. The alien kidnaps Lana and it is up to a powerless Superboy and Andy to rescue her.
32	6	"Bizarro... the Thing of Steel"	Kevin Bowser	Mark Jones	November 11, 1989
While Professor Peterson is testing his new duplicating ray, Superboy arrives to see his progress. Lightning causes a power surge, which in turn causes the ray to hit Superboy. The result of the ray is Bizarro, an imperfect duplicate of Superboy who possesses all of his powers, but a very limited intelligence. Bizarro wreaks havoc at a shopping mall and eventually takes Clark's place at the Shuster costume party under the name Kent Clark. Meanwhile, Superboy determines that he must destroy Bizarro with kryptonite. Even worse, Professor Peterson tells Superboy his first duplication experiment became unstable and exploded, and the same thing will happen to Bizarro. After Bizarro causes a disruption at the costume party and stops Lana on the road, Superboy uses the kryptonite on him only to discover it has no effect. Bizarro throws the rock back at Superboy and flies away with Lana in his arms. Superboy lies on the street, writhing in pain.
33	7	"The Battle with Bizarro"	David Nutter	Mark Jones	November 18, 1989
Bizarro takes Lana to a closed furniture store and decides it will be their new home together. When the police stage a raid on the store since Lana was kidnapped, Bizarro mistakes them for muggers trying to harm his woman. Meanwhile, Superboy is saved from the kryptonite by Andy, and he and the professor determine that Bizarro will only be affected by Bizarro kryptonite. Upon learning of Bizarro's whereabouts, Superboy goes to confront him while Prof. Peterson works on duplicating the kryptonite. Superboy and Bizarro battle in a carnival area and eventually Bizarro begins to smoke. He is unstable, and will likely explode if he is not stopped by the Bizarro kryptonite soon. Prof. Peterson arrives at the carnival with the Bizarro white kryptonite, in the last critical minutes.
34	8	"Mr. and Mrs. Superboy"	Peter Kiwitt	Denny O'Neil	November 25, 1989
Mr. Mxyzptlk returns from the fifth dimension. This time he has a giant after him who seeks revenge for a practical joke. The chase wreaks havoc all across town. Superboy and Lana stop the insanity by pretending to be married and the adoptive parents of Mxyzptlk.
35	9	"Programmed for Death"	David Nutter	Cary Bates	December 2, 1989
A robot has reprogrammed itself, taking on the personality of Andy's father, and seeks to avenge the death of its creator by killing both Andy and his real father, having Superboy get caught in the middle.
36	10	"Superboy’s Deadly Touch"	Kenneth Browser	Cary Bates & Mark Jones	December 9, 1989
Lex Luthor stages a kidnapping, then attacks Superboy with a laser on an electromagnetic field, which renders Superboy unconscious then causes his powers to go haywire, such as Superboy unknowingly using excessive force while thwarting a petty larceny. Luthor hopes that this will Superboy dangerous enough to be outlawed. This works, then Luthor tries a new scheme, agreeing to cure Superboy if he is granted a gubernatorial pardon for all his past offenses.
37	11	"The Power of Evil"	Danny Irom	Michael Prescott	December 16, 1989
A destructive force escapes its box, and Superboy, being the greatest force of good, is its target. The overseer of the box aids Superboy in capturing the force before further harm can be done to those close to him.
38	12	"Superboy... Rest in Peace"	Danny Irom	Michael Maurer & Mark Jones	December 30, 1989
An android is sent from the future to destroy Superboy. A gynoid, who knows Superboy's identity, assists him in defeating the android before he completes his mission.
39	13	"Super Menace!"	Richard J. Lewis	Michael Maurer	January 13, 1990
While running tests on kryptonite at a military facility to neutralize its effects on Superboy, they find that the alteration has emotional effects, making him apathetic. The military enlists the help of Metallo to give Superboy an attitude adjustment. After almost killing him, Superboy and Metallo join forces, posing a disastrous threat to the town.
40	14	"Yellow Peri's Spell of Doom"	Peter Kiwitt	Cary Bates & Mark Jones	January 20, 1990
A very shy waitress has a crush on Superboy, and wants him to notice her. One of her dolls comes to life and turns her into a sorcereress called Yellow Peri. The doll assists her in accomplishing her goal of making Superboy fall in love with her, hurting him and people close to him in an effort to make him submit.
41	15	"Microboy"	Richard J. Lewis	Cary Bates	January 27, 1990
A student at Shuster falls in love with Lana. Knowing that she cares for Superboy, he feels he must also be a superhero to be noticed. In an experiment, he uses microwaves to become Microboy, but when his powers go out of control, Superboy must intervene and attempt to get him under control.
42	16	"Run, Dracula, Run"	Richard J. Lewis	Cary Bates & Ilya Salkind	February 3, 1990
Byron Shelly was mugged and lost the serum that keeps his vampire cravings at bay. When Lana and Andy go to help, Byron preys on Lana and they join forces to subdue Superboy. A race ensues to get the serum to the three of them, before Lana and Superboy remain undead.
43	17	"Brimstone"	Andre Guttfreund	Mike Carlin & Andrew Helfer	February 10, 1990
A magic doctor arrives at Shuster after a scarred, deranged man attacks several people. He is after an evil spirit named Prodo, who has been using chosen people to infect the population. When Superboy tries to stop the man, he is then infected with the curse and goes out of control, and Prodo attempts to use him to eliminate the magic doctor, Brimstone.
44	18	"Abandon Earth"	Richard J. Lewis	Cary Bates & Mark Jones	February 17, 1990
Aliens claiming to be Jor-El and Lara come to Earth in search of their son Kal-El, known to the world as Superboy. Clark, however, is wary of the pair and their claims and tries to keep his adopted parents from feeling as though they are losing their son.
45	19	"Escape to Earth"	Andre Guttfreund	Cary Bates & Mark Jones	February 24, 1990
Now on the aliens' ship, Superboy, now transformed into Clark by the aliens, must figure out a way to get he and his friends off their ship. Things become complicated when Lana finds out about Clark's secret.
46	20	"Superstar"	Kenneth Bowser	T. Gilmour	March 3, 1990
Superboy tries to protect a singer that is marked for death.
47	21	"Nick Knack"	David Nutter	Mark Jones	April 14, 1990
A demented electronics genius known as Nick Knack (Gilbert Gottfried) with an affinity for toys, who was imprisoned because of Superboy, escapes. He uses his genius to develop a mechanical suit which he uses to suck away Superboy's powers. Wearing the suit, he is almost as powerful as Superboy, then proceeds to attack an Army base. Superboy convinces Nick Knack's frumpy housekeeper to free him in order to put an end to Nick Knack's rampage and return him to jail.
48	22	"The Haunting of Andy McAlister"	David Nutter	Mike Carlin & Andrew Helfer	April 21, 1990
Andy, Clark and Lana visit Andy's uncle's mansion for the weekend, only to become trapped in a wall containing a world with ghosts from the wild west. A group of outlaws seek revenge against Andy's ancestor who put them there. Superboy, now without powers in this world, must simply get them back on the other side of the wall to get rid of the ghosts.
49	23	"Revenge from the Deep"	Andre Guttfreund	Toby Martin	April 28, 1990
An immortal being possesses Lana, and sets out to settle a score with an immortal man whom she loved many years prior.
50	24	"Secrets of Superboy"	Joe Ravetz	T. Gilmour & Mark Jones	May 5, 1990
Nick Knack escapes from prison, and wants to learn all of the dirt on Superboy. He invents a mind probing machine that drains all the memory out of its victims, and uses it on Andy and Lana to uncover all of Superboy's weaknesses. This episode is mostly a clip show.
51	25	"Johnny Casanova and the Case of the Secret Serum"	David Nutter	Mark Jones & Ilya Salkind	May 12, 1990
Lana's tennis instructor is rebuffed by Lana, then met by his mortally wounded brother who stole a potion from the Mafia that causes the user to influence other people. After imbibing the potion, he becomes "Johnny Casanova", a much less attractive slob, but has the ability to charm people. "Casanova" uses his powers to make his mob enforcers friendly and Lana fall in love with him, but it seems Superboy is not affected, nor is the Mafia don.
52	26	"The Woman Called Tiger Eye"	Andre Guttfreund	Michael Maurer	May 19, 1990
After acquiring a quintet of special crystals, a woman uses Superboy to fuse them together so she can use its power to control everyone.

=== Season 3 (1990–91) ===
No. overall	No. in season	Title	Directed by	Written by	Original release date
53	1	"The Bride of Bizarro: Part 1"	David Grossman	Mike Carlin & Andrew Helfer	October 6, 1990
As Clark and Lana begin their internship at the Bureau for Extra-Normal Matters, Bizarro returns from deep space to announce on a talk show that he wants a mate. Lex Luthor decides to use the duplicating ray that originally created Bizarro to create a female companion for the Thing of Steel, but Bizarro must first steal for Luthor a supply of kryptonite he can use to kill Superboy. When Superboy takes to the skies to stop him, the confrontation ends with Superboy downed by kryptonite on a rooftop, left for dead.
54	2	"The Bride of Bizarro: Part 2"	David Grossman	Mike Carlin & Andrew Helfer	October 13, 1990
After Luthor threatens to create explosive Bizarro duplicates of everyone in the city if Superboy doesn't appear at his lair by midnight, Bizarro once again agrees to kill Superboy in exchange for a Bizarro-bride. When Luthor creates a Bizarro duplicate of Lana Lang, Bizarro is prepared to uphold his end of the bargain, and this time Superboy may not be able to escape.
55	3	"The Lair"	David Grossman	Stan Berkowitz	October 20, 1990
Clark, Lana, and Matt investigate sightings of a creature that was deformed as a result of contaminated water. The creature turns out to be a former employee of Pat Kenderson (from season 1's "Troubled Waters").
56	4	"Neila"	Mark Vargo	Gary Rosen	October 27, 1990
A superhuman woman comes from another world in search of Superboy, testing him for his worthiness to be her husband. She causes destruction in the process, but Superboy tries to teach her what it means to care for others.
57	5	"Roads Not Taken: Part 1"	Richard J. Lewis	Stan Berkowitz & John Francis Moore	November 3, 1990
An anonymous letter leads Superboy to Darla's hideout, where she has Lana locked in a meat locker. She is holding Lana to blackmail Superboy, so he'll bring Luthor back through a portal (created by Dr. Winger) that took him to an alternate world. Superboy agrees to go after Luthor and finds himself in a dark alternate world where chaos has erupted as a result of Luthor's murder by an alternate Superboy. As Superboy tries to return Luthor, he and an alternate Dr. Winger attack him with kryptonite.
58	6	"Roads Not Taken: Part 2"	Richard J. Lewis	John Francis Moore	November 10, 1990
Superboy jumps through the portal to escape the kryptonite assault. He finds himself in another alternate world, where his alternate is called the "Sovereign", a dictator that rules using fear tactics. Lana and Luthor, lovers in this world, are leading a revolution to overthrow the Sovereign. Luthor is killed when the Sovereign's army attacks his hideout, leading Superboy to confront the Sovereign in his citadel. Unexpectedly, Lana confronts the Sovereign as well, armed with a kryptonite bomb. When she sets off the bomb, killing herself and the Sovereign, the alternate Superboy from the previous world rescues the original Superboy from the kryptonite-laden shockwave. Superboy and Luthor return home, and the portal is destroyed.
59	7	"The Sons of Icarus"	Richard J. Lewis	Paul Stubenrauch	November 17, 1990
After a number of flying men are spotted over Capitol City, Matt Ritter learns that the men are part of a group called the "Katia", descendants of African slaves who gained the power to fly. When Matt discovers he is one of them, he quits his job at the Bureau and joins the group. Clark and Lana find out that there is a connection between the Katia and a series of fires that have broken out throughout the city, and if the Katia are not stopped, Capitol City could burn to the ground.
60	8	"Carnival"	David Grossman	Toby Martin	November 24, 1990
A carnival appears out of thin air, and its owner steals the spirits of some of the carnival-goers, and tests Superboy to break his moral spirit.
61	9	"Test of Time"	David Grossman	David Gerrold	December 1, 1990
Two beings from another world come to Earth and alter time, accelerating Superboy's presence. They test him, gauging his reactions and using the results to determine if the entire human race on Earth can be conquered so they'll know how to take over the world.
62	10	"Mindscape"	David Nutter	Mike Carlin & Andrew Helfer	December 8, 1990
A construction worker brings an unusual glowing rock to the Bureau and when Superboy appears to investigate, an alien creature leaps from the rock and attaches itself to Superboy. Courtesy of the creature, Superboy experiences a series of nightmares: one in which his secret identity is revealed, one in which he discovers he is a robot, and one in which Clark and Superboy fight for Lana's love. Meanwhile, the creature feeds off the adrenaline the dreams are causing Superboy to generate and if the Bureau staff cannot remove the creature, Superboy will die. WCW wrestler Lex Luger cameos as an evil version of Superboy via hallucination.
63	11	"Superboy... Lost"	Richard J. Lewis	Michael Maurer	December 15, 1990
When Superboy tries to intercept a meteor that is approaching Earth, he is injured, resulting in amnesia. In the forest, a mother and son find him and nurse him back to health, while he rediscovers who he truly is. All the while, the mother and son are in hiding, trying to avoid death, courtesy of the boy's father.
64	12	"Special Effects"	David Grossman	Elliott Anderson	January 5, 1991
When a monster-like creature kills a movie producer, Clark and Lana are sent to investigate. They find that a rift in time is releasing more creatures, and Superboy discovers that one of them has a score to settle. Ilan Mitchell-Smith appears in this episode as Andy McCalister.
65	13	"Neila and the Beast"	Jefferson Kibbee	Stan Berkowitz & Lawrence Klaven	January 12, 1991
Neila returns to Earth, and summons Superboy to aid her in destroying a creature that is out to kill her.
66	14	"The Golem"	Robert Weimer	Paul Stubenrauch	January 19, 1991
When an elderly Jewish man is being harassed by Neo-Nazis, he creates a Golem, a creature from folklore. He instructs the Golem to defend him from the Neo-Nazis. When the Golem accidentally kills his creator, without anyone to guide him, he starts attacking anyone wearing a uniform (including police officers). Superboy tries to stop the Golem, but a mysterious man helps the Golem to escape. When the Golem attacks a Neo-Nazi rally, the mysterious man returns.
67	15	"A Day in the Double Life"	David Nutter	Stan Berkowitz & Paul Stubenrauch	January 26, 1991
Clark chronicles his daily activities for his boss, rewording his outings as Superboy to cover up his identity. This leads to the conclusion that he leads a rather boring life.
68	16	"Bodyswap"	David Grossman	Paul Schiffer	February 2, 1991
Superboy is tricked into swapping bodies with Lex Luthor, which causes confusion for everyone involved in their lives.
69	17	"Rebirth: Part 1"	Richard J. Lewis	Paul Diamond	February 9, 1991
Clark decides to give up being Superboy and using his powers after a man dies, supposedly as a result of Superboy's actions.
70	18	"Rebirth: Part 2"	Richard J. Lewis	Paul Diamond	February 16, 1991
Lana sets out to clear Superboy's name, so he can be vindicated of the town's condemnation.
71	19	"Werewolf"	Bryan Spicer	Toby Martin	February 23, 1991
Clark and company try to help a young woman, who has led them on a goose chase looking for a werewolf that she'd spotted. Meanwhile, she has a secret of her own.
72	20	"People vs. Metallo"	Richard J. Lewis	Mike Carlin & Andrew Helfer	April 6, 1991
Court is in session for the trial of Metallo, but he turns the tables when kryptonite is smuggled into the courtroom, giving him strength to overtake it, and Superboy. He puts Superboy on trial while on the stand, subdued by the green rock, and it will take the teamwork of everyone in the room to bring Metallo down.
73	21	"Jackson and Hyde"	John Huneck	Toby Martin	April 13, 1991
Jackson takes an elixir that makes him stronger, and transforms his behavior. As a result, he is now being blamed for the beating deaths of two people. Little does anyone know, there's a second person who's also taking the elixir.
74	22	"Mine Games"	Hugh Martin	Sherman Howard	April 20, 1991
After a botched rescue attempt Superboy and Lex Luthor end up trapped in a lead coated mine, with a chunk of Kryptonite, and they discuss some of their issues.
75	23	"Wish for Armageddon"	Robert Weimer	Gerard Christopher	May 4, 1991
Superboy cannot determine why his dreams about some of the world's disasters are actually happening. When he finds that he may have been responsible, he does some research, and finds that he unknowingly signed a "contract" with an immortal form of evil, who has been a part of every ill-willed tyrant in history. He has to destroy the contract to be released from his control.
76	24	"Standoff"	John Huneck	Joseph Gunn	May 11, 1991
Clark, his friends, and innocent bystanders are holed up in a building as hostages, and Clark must find a way to rescue them without revealing his identity.
77	25	"The Road to Hell: Part 1"	David Nutter	Stan Berkowitz, Michael Maurer & Matt Uitz	May 18, 1991
Superboy is taken to an alternate world where he as a child is living in the jungle and must be saved from being captured. A run-in with an alternate Lex Luthor creates complications.
78	26	"The Road to Hell: Part 2"	David Nutter	Stan Berkowitz, Michael Maurer & Matt Uitz	May 25, 1991
After Superboy's near death run-in with Luthor, he is taken to yet another universe, one of which an alternate Dr. Winger, Luthor (who is now a doctor), and Superman (a future version of Superboy) exist. Dr. Winger admits that he's responsible for Superboy's latest (and dangerous) adventure. The alternate version of Luthor works to save Superboy who has lost a lot of blood and needs a transfusion to live. Dr. Luthor asks Superman, who is now retired and an old friend, father figure and mentor to him to help. Superman agrees and donates blood. Later, Superman visits Superboy as he recovers and shows him the utopian world that he helped create. Additionally, Superman explains that the reason for the age difference between himself, Superboy and the child found in the alternate universe is that the escape rockets that left Krypton all passed through a timewarp, resulting in different versions of Superman landing at different times in history. Superman also lets slip a few interesting facts about things regarding Superboy's origins and history that Superboy has not discovered yet. Despite being pressed by Superboy for details, Superman won't say more. Later, as they tour the city, Superboy expresses his concerns that he won't be able to do the same things in his universe. Superman assures him that he can do it while Superboy confronts the older Superman about feeling bored with life and needing to feel useful. Superboy asks if Superman is happy with his life, given the sacrifices he must have made to help the world. Superman answers that he was proud to be able to help people, but regrets never having children and family. Superboy returns to the other universe and faces Luthor in a brief battle and is slightly injured. In the end, Luthor is taken away and the older Superman arrives to send Superboy back to his universe and take the younger alternate version of himself into his care to be properly nurtured and taught to help others as well as giving the older Superman a new purpose. Ron Ely guest stars as Superman.

=== Season 4 (1991–92) ===
No. overall	No. in season	Title	Directed by	Written by	Original release date
79	1	"A Change of Heart: Part 1"	David Nutter	Paul Stubenrauch	October 6, 1991
Superboy investigates a wave of violence in Capitol City after a number of large video screens broadcasting positive messages are installed throughout the city. Lana begins dating the man behind the message screens: Adam Verrell (Michael Des Barres). When Lana is found dead, Superboy is accused of her murder.
80	2	"A Change of Heart: Part 2"	David Nutter	Paul Stubenrauch	October 13, 1991
Superboy is behind bars, while violence continues to spread throughout Capitol City. Adam Verrell, who faked Lana's death to frame Superboy, holds her hostage to force reformed criminal Tommy Puck (Bill Mumy) to improve on his machine which makes people lose their inhibitions.
81	3	"The Kryptonite Kid"	Thierry Notz	Mike Carlin & Andrew Helfer	October 20, 1991
Young scientist Mike Walker (Jay Underwood) is infected with kryptonite during a lab explosion and becomes "living, breathing kryptonite". A cure is developed for his condition, but he would rather use his newfound powers to wreak havoc than give them up. Superboy has to find a way to capture Walker so he can be cured, but he cannot get close, so he has to recruit an unlikely ally.
82	4	"The Basement"	Hugh Martin	Toby Martin	October 27, 1991
Lana investigates some strange occurrences in a basement and encounters an alien from a planet where beings have no identities of their own and survive by taking the identities of others. The alien begins the process of stealing Lana's identity, becoming Lana physically and mentally. Lana must find a way to contact Superboy and let him know which Lana is the real deal.
83	5	"Darla Goes Ballistic"	John Huneck	Sherman Howard	November 3, 1991
Darla, ignored by Lex Luthor on her birthday, drinks an experimental formula which gives her strange and erratic mental powers along with superior intelligence. As her powers grow, she loses control and her abilities threaten to destroy the world. Superboy and Luthor must work together to develop an antidote to remove Darla's powers before it is too late.
84	6	"Paranoia"	David Nutter	Paul Stubenrauch	November 10, 1991
UFOs land outside Capitol City and the Bureau for Extra-Normal Matters attempts to investigate. Before they can make a move, Dennis Jackson's superiors arrive from Washington, claiming that a member of staff is withholding information that could affect national security. When the national Bureau chief is murdered, paranoia grips the staff, with everyone blaming a different person for the murder, but somehow the clues just don't add up, and there may be something stranger going on at the Bureau.
85	7	"Know Thine Enemy: Part 1"	Bryan Spicer	J.M. DeMatteis	November 17, 1991
Lex Luthor has plans to bring about the end of the world by detonating a network of "dirty bombs" that will wipe out the population with a cloud of radiation. He has a plan to get Superboy out of the way as well. Superboy is drawn to an old lair of Luthor's by a hypersonic signal. There he finds that Lana has followed him and they discover a computer program, created by Luthor, known as a "psycho-disc". The program allows the user to live out Luthor's life in a virtual reality type environment. Superboy activates the program and becomes Luthor in the VR world. He sees how Luthor lived with an abusive father, and a mother who refused to stand up for herself. The only person Luthor ever loved was his sister Lena. Meanwhile, back in the real world, Lana learns that if Superboy is not removed from the VR world soon, he will be trapped in a never ending loop of Luthor's memories. Lana becomes a part of the program herself, hoping to rescue Superboy. Back at his new lair, Luthor reveals android duplicates of himself and Lena. He says they will live on, even after everyone else on earth is gone. Luthor then activates the countdown on his death bomb.
86	8	"Know Thine Enemy: Part 2"	Bryan Spicer	J.M. DeMatteis	November 24, 1991
Lana appears in Luthor's VR world just as Superboy, believing he is Luthor, is about the kill "his" parents with a bomb. She convinces Superboy that he is not Luthor and none of what is happening is real. As soon as he acknowledges this, the program shuts down. Back at Luthor's lair, Darla now sees how truly crazy Lex is, and shoots him in the shoulder. She activates a hypersonic signal and Superboy follows it to the new lair. Meanwhile, Lana learns that Luthor's sudden death wish came about because his beloved Lena died in a car crash one week ago. The utilities, however, were turned off the day before she died, and no body was ever found. Lana goes in search of Lena, who she believes is still alive somewhere. Luthor unleashes his android double to kill Superboy. The two fight as the countdown to destruction continues. Minutes before the bombs are to go off, Lana arrives with now 23-year-old Lena, who may be able to talk Luthor down.
87	9	"Hell Breaks Loose"	Robert Weimer	James Ponti	December 1, 1991
Strange things begin to happen at the Bureau after a construction project begins. Tools are found twisted and mangled, computers print countless sheets filled with the name "Lisa", and strange noises are heard. While working one night, Lana is nearly blown out of the window by a gust of wind coming from inside the building. She calls in a paranormal specialist and a psychic to investigate and they discover a gun hidden in a retaining wall that is not part of the building plans. The gun fires at the wall, which Lana is standing in front of, all on its own, and Superboy appears to stop it. He smashes through the retaining wall to find a skeleton, which is likely the remains of a clarinet player named Johnny murdered 50 years ago when the Bureau was a grand ballroom called "The Trocadel". The psychic claims the spirit is at rest now, but at night things go insane as the hole in the wall begins to glow and pull things and people toward it. The doors slam shut and won't open. Superboy arrives to free everyone trapped inside and try to quiet the raging spirit, but he fails. Lana, however succeeds by bringing in an elderly woman named Lisa who knew Johnny 50 years ago. Johnny told Lisa that he would wait for her there, but was killed by a mob boss he once worked for before Lisa arrived. He tells her he has been waiting for her all these years and he will still be waiting when she is ready.
88	10	"Into the Mystery"	John Huneck	J.M. DeMatteis	December 8, 1991
While trying to save the life of a man whose car just crashed, Superboy encounters an unusual ghostly woman. After the encounter, Clark begins to reminisce about his aunt Cassandra and everything that she taught him as a kid but his reminiscing is cut short as he has to save the life of a young boy, and once again he encounters the ghostly woman. After a third encounter at a fire in a nursing home, Superboy begins to search for Cassandra and locates her in a cabin outside the city. She is dying of cancer and has been hearing strange music, which is the music of the ghostly woman that plays. She appears once again at Cassandra's cabin and Superboy attempts to stop her, but she is immune to all of his powers. When Cassandra appears on the front steps of the cabin, in perfect health, it becomes clear that the ghostly woman was leading Superboy to his dying aunt so she could say goodbye.
89	11	"To Be Human: Part 1"	John Huneck	J.M. DeMatteis	January 19, 1992
After a year of "normal" life, Bizarro Lana explodes one afternoon leaving Bizarro devastated. Superboy finds Bizarro mourning Bizarro Lana and offers him hope, being made into a normal human being. Superboy takes Bizarro to Dr. Lynn, who has developed a process that can use Superboy's brainwaves to correct Bizarro's imperfect mind. The transfer works, but something causes the machines to overload. Superboy is left disoriented and weak. Meanwhile, Chaos, an insane terrorist, is bombing parts of the city and wreaking havoc. Chaos is spotted by Superboy driving down a Capitol City street shooting at random pedestrians. As Superboy flies over, Chaos fires at him, and in his weakened state, Superboy is injured by the blast and falls to the street. Chaos drags Superboy away to dispose of him once and for all.
90	12	"To Be Human: Part 2"	John Huneck	J.M. DeMatteis	January 26, 1992
Bizarro now has a normal human appearance and is calling himself Bill Zarro. He has no super-powers in this form. He is working with Dr. Lynn to improve his mental skills when Chaos interrupts a TV broadcast. He announces that he has Superboy and will throw him off the highest building in Capitol City at midnight. Dr. Lynn recognizes Chaos. She says he was once a brilliant scientist, but a laboratory accident left him disfigured and now he blames the world for his problems. Bill Zarro now has to make a choice. He can be restored to the way he was before the process was performed. He can become "Bizarro" again, but the process cannot be reversed again once this is done. Now he's faced with sacrificing his chance to live a normal human life to save Superboy.
91	13	"West of Alpha Centauri"	Jefferson Kibbee	Mark Jones	February 2, 1992
Superboy and Lana are kidnapped and taken aboard a spaceship whose destination is a paradise planet just west of Alpha Centauri. Inside the ship, Superboy finds most of the occupants are prisoners of a deranged captain, and they all believe Superboy is their savior from an old prophecy. The jailers are stronger than Superboy, and he cannot escape without the help of the prisoners who are too busy fighting among themselves. Superboy must find a way to convince everyone to band together to overthrow the captain and take back control of their ship.
92	14	"Threesome: Part 1"	David Nutter	Stan Berkowitz	February 9, 1992
Luthor and Metallo are broken out of prison by Odessa Vexman, the prison psychiatrist, and the three join forces to finally get rid of the source of their mutual frustration: Superboy. When they attack Capitol City together, Superboy arrives to confront them, but is overwhelmed and forced to flee.
93	15	"Threesome: Part 2"	David Nutter	Stan Berkowitz	February 16, 1992
After nearly being destroyed by the trio, Superboy has to come up with a plan to round them up before more destruction ensues. He returns to his hometown of Smallville, where he finds a new casino is causing problems in town. The casino's owner calls on the services of Luthor, Metallo, and Odessa to get Superboy out of the way, which leads to a western-style showdown on the streets of Smallville.
94	16	"Out of Luck"	Robert Weimer	Sandy Fries	February 23, 1992
A petty thief steals a rare coin that supposedly gives him good luck while cursing everyone else around him. He uses his newfound luck to commit multiple robberies, while Superboy keeps finding himself unable to stop the thief due to unusual circumstances. Lana tries to find a way to counteract the curse, and finds herself in danger, and Superboy may be too cursed to save her.
95	17	"Who Is Superboy?"	Robert Weimer	Stan Berkowitz	March 1, 1992
An intelligent computer that can recreate events in amazing detail arrives at the Bureau. Lana uses it to analyze multiple incidents involving Superboy, with the intention of finding out his secret identity in the process. All of the clues seem to point to a certain co-worker named Clark Kent. Note: This episode is a "clip show".
96	18	"Cat and Mouse"	Peter Kiwitt	Gerard Christopher	April 19, 1992
Clark is forced to see a psychiatrist (Erin Gray) in order to keep his job at the Bureau. He must find a way to answer her questions truthfully without compromising his Superboy identity. When he is subjected to a lie detector test, he may be forced to take desperate measures. Note: This episode is another "clip show".
97	19	"Obituary for a Superhero"	John Huneck	Stan Berkowitz	April 26, 1992
The TV news show Nighttime covers the breaking news of Superboy's apparent death involving a yacht, a distress call, and a kryptonite bomb. Friends and enemies are interviewed while a Coast Guard vessel attempts to locate the body, if there is one. Note: This episode is done in the style of a news program covering Superboy's apparent death.
98	20	"Metamorphosis"	Robert Weimer	Paul Robert Coyle	May 3, 1992
The Bureau is investigating the deaths of several old people who were carrying the IDs of young adults. All of them were members of the same gym, whose owner (Roddy Piper) should be a senior citizen, but looks 30 years younger. Superboy saves the life of an old woman who turns out to be Lana Lang, and learns that the gym's owner is exchanging his blood with the blood of his younger customers (while mixing it with a formula derived from gold) in order to extend his own life. This causes his victims to become old as he becomes young. He has set his sights on Superboy's blood, which he believes will make him young forever.
99	21	"Rites of Passage: Part 1"	David Grossman	Mike Carlin & Andy Helfer	May 10, 1992
On his 21st birthday, Superboy begins to lose control of his powers. Back in Smallville, the ship that brought him to Earth has begun to glow and pulse, and Martha and Jonathan Kent are concerned. Meanwhile, Dennis Jackson takes Matt Ritter and Lana to Smallville to help him follow up on a case that he investigated 21 years ago, when he found a mysterious purple crystal in a field.
100	22	"Rites of Passage: Part 2"	David Grossman	Mike Carlin & Andy Helfer	May 17, 1992
Clark's out of control powers have been removed by his ship. He cannot complete the rite of passage that will allow him to control his powers until he finds a purple crystal that was supposed to be on-board the ship. He must find it soon or his powers will be removed permanently. As Dennis, Matt, and Lana try to track down the source of the crystal Dennis found 21 years ago, Lana once again begins to suspect that Clark is Superboy, but cannot prove it because Clark is apparently powerless. When Clark learns that the crystal has been delivered to Dennis's hotel, he must confront his old bully from high school in order to get to it.

== Home releases ==
All four seasons of this show have been released on DVD by Warner Home Video.

DVD set	Release date
Superboy: The Complete First Season	June 20, 2006
Superboy: The Complete Second Season	December 11, 2012
The Adventures of Superboy: The Complete Third Season	July 16, 2013
The Adventures of Superboy: The Complete Fourth Season; Special Edition	October 29, 2013
