= Superboy (TV series) =

American television series

- Also known as: The Adventures of Superboy
- Genre: Superhero
- Based on: Superboy by: Jerry Siegel; Joe Shuster; Don Cameron
- Developed by: Ilya Salkind; Alexander Salkind
- Starring: John Haymes Newton; Gerard Christopher; Stacy Haiduk
- Music by: Kevin Kiner
- Country of origin: United States
- Original language: English
- No. of seasons: 4
- No. of episodes: 100 (list of episodes)

Production
- Production location: Orlando, Florida
- Cinematography: Orson Ochoa
- Running time: 22 minutes
- Production companies: Alexander and Ilya Salkind Productions; Lowry Productions; Cantharus Productions; DC Comics

Original release
- Network: Syndication
- Release: October 8, 1988 – May 17, 1992

Superboy is an American television series based on the fictional DC Comics character Superman's early years as Superboy. Developed by the father-and-son duo Alexander and Ilya Salkind, the show ran for four seasons, from 1988 to 1992, in syndication. John Haymes Newton starred as Superboy for the first season; he was replaced by Gerard Christopher for the next three seasons. The series was renamed The Adventures of Superboy at the start of the third season.

== Series Production ==
Superboy was conceived as a way to utilize one of the licenses that father-son duo Alexander Salkind and Ilya Salkind had been in possession of for over a decade. In order to produce the first entry in the Superman series of films starring Christopher Reeve, the Salkinds had to pay Warner Bros. a fee to license the intellectual property. This license extended to various other properties in the franchise.

Although they sold the rights to use the Superman license to The Cannon Group, Alexander and Ilya still possessed a license to make other productions based on different characters. After failing with a film based on Supergirl in the mid-1980s, they decided to try again with Superboy and developed a series for syndication that launched in the fall of 1988.

In 1987, radio and music producer Peter R. Marino conceived the idea of bringing a series featuring the adventures of Superboy to television. After consulting his contacts at Warner Bros., he was directed to Alexander and Ilya Salkind, to whom he pitched his concept, setting the development of the series in motion.

Due to their tumultuous relationship with Warner, the Salkinds opted to distribute the series through Viacom. Rather than seeking a network, they utilized a syndication-based production model—similar to that of "Star Trek: The Next Generation." For filming, which began in mid-1988, they took advantage of the newly opened Disney/MGM Studios, which offered post-production facilities. They also leveraged tax incentives for filming in Miami and Orlando—incentives established at the time to attract Hollywood productions following the success of "Miami Vice."

The series was shot on video, a format chosen to facilitate editing via AVID and the integration of digital visual effects. The production involved several key personnel from the Superman film franchise: Oscar-winning visual effects artist Colin Chilvers directed several episodes, as did Jackie Cooper (who played Perry White in the films). Robert Harman returned to oversee the "flight" effects, while legendary casting director Lynn Stalmaster was tasked with assembling the series' cast.

=== Season 1 ===
The first season of the series, which began airing in October 1988, focused on Clark Kent / Superboy (John Haymes Newton), his childhood friend and love interest Lana Lang (Stacy Haiduk) and his college roommate T.J. White (Jim Calvert), son of Daily Planet editor Perry White. Scott James Wells played Superboy's nemesis Lex Luthor. Clark's adoptive parents, Jonathan and Martha Kent, were portrayed by Stuart Whitman and Salome Jens, respectively.

Thirteen episodes were initially filmed for Season 1, beginning with "Countdown to Nowhere". This episode featured Superboy's first public appearance as he prevents a group of saboteurs from selling a powerful laser weapon developed by the U.S. government to an arms dealer. "Countdown to Nowhere" aired in two versions: an "uncut" version in which the story plays in the present day and a second version in which the main story is introduced as a flashback through two additional scenes with Lana, Clark and T.J. The second version contained some scenes cut from the main story in order to fit the flashback lead-ins into the episode. This episode is the first episode of the series chronologically, but was the fifth one that was aired in most markets. It also appears as the fifth episode on the first season DVD set. The first season's story editor was Fred Freiberger, who also scripted a few episodes.

The first thirteen episodes of Superboy were rather crude compared to later episodes. The producers, not sure whether any additional episodes would be ordered, did their best to save money on the first thirteen. As a result, the special effects are a bit rougher and the episodes have a grittier, real-world feel to them. This brought about more character-oriented stories and stories with more ordinary villains like drug dealers and crime bosses.

After thirteen additional episodes were ordered for the first season, special effects improved and the show took on a more professional look. More fantastic enemies were introduced, such as an unnamed gaseous alien, who could possess the bodies of others in "The Alien Solution", a life-force vampire in "Succubus" and long-time Superman villain Mister Mxyzptlk (guest star Michael J. Pollard) in "Meet Mr. Mxyzptlk".

Superboy's nemesis, Lex Luthor, was introduced in "The Jewel of Techechal" (the first episode broadcast) as Clark's classmate at Shuster University. This version of Luthor was more interested in fixing basketball games and humiliating Superboy than anything else. The season one finale, "Luthor Unleashed", completely changed his character. This episode adapted Lex Luthor's silver age comic book origin, in which Superboy rescues Lex from a lab accident that causes him to lose all of his hair, becoming the familiar bald villain Superman fans have come to recognize. Luthor blames Superboy for his hair loss and gains a new, more intense hatred for the Boy of Steel. From this point on in the series, Luthor is determined to destroy Superboy, rather than just humiliate him.

=== Season 2 ===
In the second season, drastic changes took place. Newton was replaced by Gerard Christopher in the lead role. In an interview with The Superman Homepage, Newton revealed that it was his decision to leave the series, but the producers asked him several times to return to his role. He also added that he asked for a raise of salary (about 20%) that he had been promised earlier, but was denied when filming for the second season began. A new direction was made with the second season's stories guided by executive story consultants Mark Jones and Cary Bates.

Scott Wells was also replaced as Lex Luthor by Sherman Howard. The change in Luthor's appearance was explained in the second season opener "With This Ring, I Thee Kill". The two-part episode revealed Luthor had plastic surgery to assume the appearance of Warren Eckworth, the wealthy inventor of the "Superboy Gun", which Luthor believed could kill Superboy. The character of T.J. White was written out of the series (he went to work for the Daily Planet) and Andy McCalister, portrayed by Ilan Mitchell-Smith, became Clark's new roommate. Andy was different from T.J. and was constantly looking to make money with his get-rich-quick schemes. He also flirted with Lana frequently and his advances were always refused, though Lana did consider Andy a friend.

The villains were amped up in the second season, as additional comic book characters were introduced to the series, many of them appearing for the first time in live-action. Metallo (Michael Callan), Bizarro (Barry Meyers) as well as the Yellow Peri (Elizabeth Keifer) appeared in the second season and Mister Mxyzptlk (Pollard) made a return appearance. Gilbert Gottfried appeared in two episodes as a nasty, wisecracking criminal genius named "Nick Knack" who used toys to commit crimes (a reference to the Toyman). Another character was a dhampir who found a way through a serum to gain human abilities such as repelling his craving for blood and gaining a tolerance for sunlight. Thus, he became a friend of both Superboy and Lana but would become villainous if doing without the serum for too long. Philip Michael Thomas also made an appearance as a medieval alchemist who survived into modern times in order to battle a sorcerer spreading plague, and aided Superboy when he was infected by said disease. The episode "Superboy... Rest in Peace" featured guest star Betsy Russell, who was reunited with series star Gerard Christopher for the first time since the two had worked together previously in the 1985 film Tomboy. Also notable is the guest star appearance of former James Bond actor George Lazenby and Bond girl actress Britt Ekland as aliens disguised as Superboy's Kryptonian father and mother, Jor-El and Lara, in two episodes, "Abandon Earth" and "Escape to Earth".

=== Season 3 ===
With the third season, the series saw more changes. The show's title officially became The Adventures of Superboy and the setting shifted from Shuster University to The Bureau for Extra-Normal Matters in Capitol City, Florida, where Clark and Lana were interns. The Bureau is depicted as a government agency which investigates paranormal activities and aliens, including Superboy (this format change pre-dates the concept of the television series The X-Files).

Andy McCalister was dropped from the series, though Ilan Mitchell-Smith would make a final guest appearance in the episode "Special Effects", which explained his disappearance by saying that Andy went to intern at a movie studio. The new supporting cast consisted of Clark and Lana's co-worker at the Bureau, Matt Ritter (Peter Jay Fernandez) and the Bureau chief C. Dennis Jackson (Robert Levine).

The tone of the series changed dramatically as darker stories were produced and the overall look of the series took on many characteristics of film noir. A few journalists at the time suggested that this darker look was largely due to the success of Tim Burton's Batman film from a year prior. Many stories dealt with more mature themes, a change new producer Julia Pistor implemented. In "Rebirth", Superboy is confronted with the possibility that he may have accidentally taken a human life and gives up his Superboy identity in guilt. "Carnival" shows a demonic individual named 'Deville' trying to acquire Superboy's eternal soul by tempting him to give in and kill a man who is implied to be a rapist. "Mindscape" deals with Superboy's deepest fears as an alien life-form brings those fears to life in Superboy's nightmares while simultaneously draining his life energy. "Roads Not Taken" shows the different paths Superboy's life may have taken, as Superboy travels to alternate earths where his life is very different. He meets a version of himself who killed Luthor in a fit of rage and another who has become a despotic ruler of earth. The alternate version of Superboy who took Luthor's life was shown wearing a black leather jacket and sunglasses which bears some resemblance to the Conner Kent version of Superboy as he first appeared in "The Death of Superman" storyline. The third season ended with the two-part episode "The Road to Hell", where Ron Ely makes a guest appearance as an adult, retired version of Superman from an alternate reality.

=== Season 4 ===
The fourth season maintained the darker look and feel of the third one and was the first in which no major cast changes took place. Noel Neill and Jack Larson made guest appearances in the episode "Paranoia" as employees of the Bureau for Extra-Normal Matters. Neill had originated the role of Lois Lane in the 1948 Superman and 1950 Atom Man vs. Superman film serials and replaced Phyllis Coates in the role in the 1950s Adventures of Superman TV series before originating the role of Lois' mother, Ella/Ellen Lane, in 1978's Superman; Larson co-starred as Jimmy Olsen in Adventures of Superman with Neill and also had a cameo in Superman Returns. The trend of more mature stories also continued in episodes such as "To Be Human", in which Bizarro becomes human, only to be forced to give up his humanity to save Superboy's life and "Into the Mystery", in which a mystical, ghostly woman, apparently an angel of death, leads Superboy to his dying aunt's bedside. A memorable Luthor tale, "Know Thine Enemy", appeared in this season, featuring Superboy re-living Luthor's tortured memories of childhood via "psychodisk" while Luthor threatened to destroy all life on Earth.

== Series end ==
In 1991, higher-ups at DC had begun to conceive a new, more modern Superman series based on John Byrne's 1986 reset of the comic's canon, a move that resulted in Clark Kent never becoming Superboy. DC President Jenette Kahn began work with Warner Bros. executives Deborah Joy LeVine and Les Moonves on the series. Meanwhile, in the fall of that year, Superboy's fourth season premiered. It was intended as the final season of new episodes, with the finale, "Obituary for a Superhero", to result in Superboy's apparent death; a series of made-for-television movies was planned to continue the story.

Before production could begin on the intended finale, ABC agreed to take on the new series that had been in development at Warner Bros.; although Lois & Clark: The New Adventures of Superman would not debut on television until the following season, Warner Bros. contacted the Salkinds and informed them that their Superman licenses would be cancelled at the end of the 1991–92 television season. This decision forced the writers of Superboy to come up with a definitive finale to close out the fourth season, since Warner Bros.' decision meant that the planned series of telefilms would have to be scrapped. "Obituary for a Superhero" was rewritten and aired on April 26, 1992. The final episode, titled "Rites of Passage", aired in two parts on May 10 and 17, 1992, and featured a story where Clark faced the potential of losing his superpowers and never becoming Superman.

Afterward, Alexander and Ilya decided to challenge Warner Bros. in court over the termination of their licensing agreement, eventually reaching a settlement in 2005. As per the terms of the settlement, Warner Bros. retained all of the rights to the past and future Superman franchise television series and films with the exception of Superman IV, which at the time had its rights owned by Paramount Pictures through its acquisition of the assets of the now-defunct Cannon Group (those rights have since passed to Warner Bros.). As far as Superboy was concerned, the Salkinds and Warner Bros. agreed to divide the ownership of the series three ways, which as of 2026 are as follows:

Ilya Salkind and StudioCanal have a shared stake in the series; Ilya inherited his father's after Alexander died and StudioCanal acquired the Salkind studio after it went bankrupt.
Warner Bros. holds worldwide home media distribution rights and international television distribution rights.
As the result of a series of mergers, Paramount Skydance Corporation's subsidiary CBS Media Ventures holds the television distribution rights in the United States; Viacom purchased Paramount in 1994 and eventually folded its television distribution operation into Paramount’s, which eventually was merged into CBS' operations after the acquisition of the network by Viacom.

== Cast ==
=== Main ===
- John Haymes Newton (season 1) as Kal-El / Clark Kent / Superboy
- Gerard Christopher (season 2–4) as Kal-El / Clark Kent / Superboy
- Stacy Haiduk as Lana Lang
- Ilan Mitchell-Smith (season 2; guest: season 3) as Andy McCalister
- Jim Calvert (season 1) as Trevor Jenkins "T.J." White
- Peter Jay Fernandez (season 3–4) as Matt Ritter
- Robert Levine (season 3–4) as C. Dennis Jackson

=== Recurring ===
- Scott James Wells (season 1) as Lex Luthor
- Sherman Howard (season 2–4) as Lex Luthor
- George Chakiris (season 1–2) as Professor Peterson
- Zevi Wolmark (season 3–4) as Christopher Grimes

=== Guest ===
- George Lazenby as Jor-El
- Britt Ekland as Lara
- Stuart Whitman as Jonathan Kent
- Salome Jens as Martha Kent
- Barry Meyers as Bizarro
- Michael Callan as Roger Corben / Metallo
- Michael J. Pollard as Mister Mxyzptlk
- Denise Gossett as Lena Luthor
  - Jennifer Hawkins as young Lena Luthor
- Gilbert Gottfried as Nick Knack
- Michael Manno as Leo
- Roger Pretto as Lt. Zeke Harris
- Tracy Roberts as Darla
- Philip Michael Thomas as Brimstone
- Ron Ely as alternate Superman

== Episodes ==
Season	Episodes	Originally released	
Season	Episodes	First released	Last released
1	26	October 8, 1988	May 27, 1989
2	26	October 7, 1989	May 19, 1990
3	26	October 6, 1990	May 25, 1991
4	22	October 6, 1991	May 17, 1992

== Production ==
The Superboy series was brought to the screen by executive producers Ilya and Alexander Salkind, the producers of the first three Superman films and the 1984 Supergirl film. This series and the release of the 1988 Superman animated series on CBS coincided with the 50th anniversary celebrations of the Superman character that year. Ironically, the series came about a year after DC Comics had "erased" the character of Superboy from their continuity in The Man of Steel reboot by John Byrne. Nevertheless, the show went on in October 1988 with John Haymes Newton playing the lead role of Clark Kent / Superboy, along with Stacy Haiduk as love interest Lana Lang and Jim Calvert as Clark's college roommate T.J. White. In the Philippines, the series premiered on People's Television Network on September 4, 1989.

Superboy was the first weekly TV series to be produced at the then new Disney/MGM Studios. For the second season onward, the series moved several miles up Interstate 4 to Universal Studios Florida, the largest motion picture and television-sound facility outside Hollywood, where it was then showcased as that studio's first weekly television product.

At first, much of the action centered around stories that Clark and T.J. reported on for the college newspaper, the Shuster Herald. All the exterior scenes shot at "Shuster University" are actually filmed on the main campus of the University of Central Florida. Siegelville, however, was depicted as a coastal city, as evidenced by imagery of both the new and old Sunshine Skyway Bridges (Interstate 275) in St. Petersburg, Florida in the opening credits.

Superboy was scripted by many actual comic-book writers. Superman editors Mike Carlin and Andrew Helfer penned several episodes, such as "The Alien Solution", its sequel "Revenge of the Alien" and "The Bride of Bizarro". Other comic book writers that contributed to the series include Denny O'Neil, Cary Bates, J. M. DeMatteis and Mark Evanier.

Clark Kent/Superboy attends the Siegel School of Journalism at Shuster University in Shusterville, Florida – names which reference Superman's creators, Jerry Siegel and Joe Shuster.

== Comic book tie-in ==
DC Comics published a tie-in comic book series during the TV show's run, launching the comic during the TV series' second season. Superboy (Volume 2) is different from any other Superman or Superboy titles in that it is set in the continuity of the Superboy television series, as opposed to the regular DC Universe. Its intent was to explore some of the unseen tales and events that the TV series could not. The series originally carried the cover title Superboy: The Comic Book with issue #1 having a photo cover with the show's stars Gerard Christopher and Stacy Haiduk (dated Feb. 1990), although the title in the indicia was simply Superboy. After issue #11, the series changed its cover title to The Adventures of Superboy as the TV series itself had changed titles starting with season three, and the change was reflected in the comic book's indicia beginning with #18. The series was published monthly until it went bi-monthly for its final three issues, remained in publication for 22 issues to the end of 1991 (cover dated Feb. 1992), and a concluding one issue special in 1992.

== Home media ==
=== Bootleg VHS and DVDs ===
Some time after the series' cancellation, there was a dispute over what rights to the character the Salkinds actually owned. For a time this prevented any official home video release of the series. Between 1992 and 2006 the only way to see Superboy in the United States was by ordering bootleg VHS and DVD copies of the series sold on eBay and other websites. The audio and video quality of these copies varied.

In 1999, Gerard Christopher began offering three VHS tapes of the series created from his personal master tapes (Christopher has masters of all of the episodes he starred in, Seasons 2–4). Each video tape featured four selected episodes from Seasons 3 and 4. A fourth VHS video tape was released by Christopher in 2002. Christopher sold these video tapes on his website by mail order and at personal appearances when attending various comic book conventions and shows.

In response to overwhelming fan demand, Christopher decided to offer all Superboy episodes on DVD, offering a complete Season 2 set on DVD in early June 2004 and planned to sell complete sets of Seasons 3 and 4 in the future. When Warner Home Video announced the official release of Season 1, Christopher announced that his self-produced DVD sets would no longer be available on his website in 2005, with the planned DVD releases for Seasons 3 and 4 cancelled.

=== Aftermath of the first legal battle ===
In an interview for the webpage supermanhomepage.com, Salkind revealed that the legal battle between the three companies involved in the series' production (Viacom, Warner Bros. and the Salkinds) was the reason the show was not re-run on television or released to home video. This dispute was settled circa 2005, allowing the series to be released on DVD.

=== DVD release summary ===
==== The Complete First Season ====
The DVD set includes a behind-the-scenes featurette with new interviews with first-season Clark Kent/Superboy actor John Haymes Newton, actors Stacy Haiduk and James Calvert, creative/executive producer Ilya Salkind as well as director David Nutter. The DVD also features the screen test of John Haymes Newton and audio commentaries by Ilya Salkind and Newton on two key episodes ("Revenge of the Alien" Part 2 and "Meet Mr. Mxyzptlk"). The DVD was released in advance of the film Superman Returns.

==== The Complete Second Season ====
After a 6 1/2-year gap, Warner Bros. released the complete second season of Superboy on DVD via its Warner Archive Collection on December 11, 2012. This is a manufacture-on-demand (MOD) release, available exclusively through Warner's online store and only in the US, as well as Amazon.com through their CreateSpace service, which ships globally.

==== The Complete Third Season ====
Warner Bros. released the complete third season of Superboy on July 16, 2013, via MOD, through Warner Archive, as well as Amazon.com through their CreateSpace service, which ships globally.

==== The Complete Fourth Season ====
The fourth season was listed at warnerarchive.com for an October 29, 2013 release date. For a limited time, the first 1,000 copies of the DVD set were autographed by series star Gerard Christopher; the non-autographed version becomes available upon exhaustion of the autographed inventory. It is also available from Amazon.com through their CreateSpace service, which ships globally.

=== Streaming ===
All four seasons were made available in 2018 for streaming on DC Universe, a paid streaming subscription specializing in DC Comics-related content. As the episodes were shot and edited on film in 4:3 (then transferred to videotape), these episodes are presented in standard definition at their original 4:3 display ratio. The series is also available on Amazon Prime and Apple TV.
