= Cheerleader Camp (disambiguation) =

Cheerleader Camp is a 1988 movie starring Betsy Russell.

Cheerleader Camp may also refer to:

- Cheerleader Camp (2007 film), a television movie starring Kristin Cavallari
- Cheerleading, organized routines to cheer on sports teams
