= Wolmark =

Wolmark is a surname. "Wolmark" is a Jewish term for people from Poland. Variants of the surname can be found in other countries of Eastern Europe, as well as Argentina and the United States.

== People ==
- Alfred Wolmark (c.1877 – 1961), Polish painter and decorative artist
- Jenny Wolmark, British writer and professor
- Nina Wolmark, Belarusian writer and producer of animated series
- Zevi Wolmark (born 1962), American TV actor
