= Ninja III: The Domination =

1984 film directed by Sam Firstenberg

- Theatrical release poster
- Directed by: Sam Firstenberg
- Written by: James R. Silke
- Produced by: Yoram Globus; Menahem Golan; David Womark
- Starring: Sho Kosugi; Lucinda Dickey; Jordan Bennett
- Cinematography: Hanania Baer
- Edited by: Michael J. Duthie
- Music by: Udi Harpaz; Misha Segal
- Production company: The Cannon Group
- Distributed by: Cannon Film Distributors
- Release date: September 14, 1984
- Running time: 92 minutes
- Country: United States
- Language: English
- Budget: $2 million
- Box office: $7,610,785

Ninja III: The Domination is a 1984 American martial arts action horror film directed by Sam Firstenberg, and starring Sho Kosugi, Lucinda Dickey, Jordan Bennett, and James Hong. It is the third film in Cannon Films' Ninja Trilogy anthology series, the first being Enter the Ninja, and the second being Revenge of the Ninja. Like the previous films in the series, it has also garnered a cult following.

== Plot ==
Christie Ryder (Dickey), a telephone linewoman and aerobics instructor, is possessed by the evil spirit of a fallen ninja warrior she encounters. The spirit uses her body to carry out his revenge on the police officers who killed him. One of them is Billy Secord (Bennett), who catches Christie's eye yet cannot explain her preoccupation with Japanese culture or help her with her sudden blackouts. Out of options, they turn to a Japanese exorcist, Miyashima (Hong), who manages to summon the ninja within her. The exorcist reveals that he cannot force the spirit out of Christie but that "only a ninja can destroy a ninja". Christie and Billy are forced to seek the aid of Goro Yamada (Kosugi), a ninja hunting the assassin within her for killing his clan. The three force the ninja out in a dangerous gambit that results in the spirit repossessing his own dead body and fighting Yamada to death, finally freeing all three of the curses of the black ninja.

== Cast ==
- Sho Kosugi as Goro Yamada
- Lucinda Dickey as Christie Ryder
- Jordan Bennett as Billy Secord
- James Hong as Miyashima
- David Chung as Black Ninja Hanjuro
- Dale Ishimoto as Okuda
- John LaMotta as Case

== Production ==
According to director Firstenberg and stunt coordinator/stunt double/performer Steven Lambert on the movie commentary for Ninja III, after the success of Enter the Ninja and Revenge of the Ninja, Cannon wanted to make a third ninja film but planned to go in a different direction by making more of an American film with a supernatural horror edge which tied into the popularity of films like Poltergeist at the time.

Sho Kosugi returned but was made a secondary character and not the lead star of the film, that role becoming a female. This was done by having a female character becoming possessed by the spirit of a dying male ninja, which also drew from ideas inspired by The Exorcist.

After a casting process for the female star, Lucinda Dickey was the second choice but ended up getting the role with her dance background making her easily able to train for the martial arts required in the film. Dickey also starred in Cannon's Breakin' movie about breakdancing which had been produced after Ninja III but was released before it due to a rush to get it into cinemas before a similarly-themed film (Beat Street, released by Orion Pictures). This also allowed Cannon to leverage on the popularity and success of that film when promoting Ninja III.

Principal photography began in Phoenix, Arizona, on 31 October 1983, and filming continued into early 1984 to a cost of approximately $2 million. It drew $7.6 million at the box office which saw it turn less profit than the prior two Cannon ninja films.

Some additional filming was undertaken to provide a stronger ending to the story and significant edits were made to the original cut to reduce the runtime to increase screenings per day and to also satisfy the censors by taking steps to not glorify violence. The original version submitted to the film censor board featured a decapitation scene which gave it an X-rating.

Lambert performed and oversaw much of the planning and execution of the various action sequences in the film, often doubling for Dickey, including when her character is climbing up the telephone pole before meeting the ninja. Lambert made extensive use of existing locations and structures on location to reduce production cost.

== Reception ==
On Rotten Tomatoes, the film holds an approval rating of 44% based on 9 reviews, with an average rating of 3.62/10. On Metacritic the film has a weighted average score of 25 out of 100, based on 7 critics, indicating "generally unfavorable reviews".

== Home media ==
Scream Factory released the film in a Blu-ray/DVD combo pack on June 11, 2013.

The film was released on Blu-ray in the U.K. in 2016 by Eureka Video.

Scream Factory re-released the film in a Collector's Edition Blu-ray set on June 12, 2018, with a new transfer and additional supplemental materials.

== See also ==
- List of American films of 1984
- List of martial arts films
