= Jordan Bennett =

American actor and singer

- Born: Jordan Bennett Suffin; April 18, 1952 (age 74); United States
- Occupations: Actor, singer

Jordan Bennett (born Jordan Bennett Suffin; April 18, 1952) is an American actor and singer-songwriter.

== Biography ==
Bennett began his career in the Catskill Mountains in upstate New York as a singer and comedian. While there, he worked with such performers as Red Buttons and Milton Berle. He went on to Broadway, where he costarred with John Cullum in the musical Shenandoah. He starred on Broadway as Cyrano de Bergerac in Cyrano The Musical. In Los Angeles, Bennett starred as Jean Valjean in the original L.A. production of Les Misérables.

On television, Bennett appeared in episodes in such television series as The Waltons, Too Close For Comfort, and Emergency!. He starred in the cult classic B-film, Ninja III: The Domination. He also appears in the Carl Reiner film, Bert Rigby You're A Fool.

In 2015, Bennett released a CD of original songs titled Original. One of the songs, "She's Got Me", was written with 10 time Grammy winner Eddie Palmieri.

Bennett has toured the world with his one man show, The FeelGood Concert, In addition, he performs The BFF Show

== Personal life ==
Bennett is Jewish and serves as a cantor at the Temple Shalom for the Arts.
