= Reign in Hell (comics) =

DC Comics limited series (2008–2009)

- Cover of Reign in Hell #1 (September 2008), art by Michael Atiyeh.

Publication information
- Publisher: DC Comics
- Schedule: Monthly
- Format: Limited series
- Genre: Superhero, horror, fantasy
- Publication date: September 2008 – April 2009
- No. of issues: 8, plus DC Universe Special: Reign in Hell #1 (August 2008)
- Main character(s): Blaze; Satanus; Neron

Creative team
- Written by: Keith Giffen
- Penciller: Thomas Derenick
- Inker: Bill Sienkiewicz
- Letterer: Steve Wands
- Colorist: Michael Atiyeh

Collected editions
- Reign in Hell: ISBN 978-1-4012-2313-7

Reign in Hell is a 2008-2009 comic book miniseries written by Keith Giffen, pencilled by Thomas Derenick, inked by Bill Sienkiewicz and published by DC Comics. The title is a reference to a line spoken by Lucifer in John Milton's epic poem Paradise Lost: "Better to reign in Hell than serve in Heaven".

== Plot ==
Hell is thrown into a massive conflict as Neron and his generals are confronted with a rebellion led by Blaze and Satanus, the rulers of Purgatory. Neron soon discovered that the rebel demons were offering the damned "hope to the hopeless" and redemption for them. Realizing what would happen if the damned ever rose up against him, Neron has his consort Lilith, the mother of all Earthborn fiends, summon all of the vampires, werewolves, ghouls, and infernally powered humans to Hell to fight on his side.

This unrest soon attracts the attention of Earth's magical superheroes, who are concerned about the outcome and the possible repercussions of the war. Many of them descend into Hell and take sides in the conflict, including Zatara, his daughter Zatanna Zatara, Etrigan the Demon, Randu Singh, Doctor Fate (Kent V. Nelson), Ragman, the Creeper, Detective Chimp, Andrew Bennett, Acheron, Zauriel, the Enchantress, Deadman, the Phantom Stranger, Sargon the Sorcerer, Ibis the Invincible, the Nightmaster, Nightshade, Midnight Rider, Warlock's Daughter, Black Alice, Blue Devil, Red Devil, and Linda Danvers. Doctor Occult and Yellow Peri descend into Hell separately from the others to free the soul of Occult's beloved, Rose Psychic, from damnation.

Lobo is confined to the Labyrinth, with his suffering powering Neron's palace. Lobo is freed from his torment as a result of the titanic battle between Etrigan and Blue Devil. Lobo tears apart the soul of Zatara, which forces Zatanna to destroy his soul and banish it to the Abyss (a place that even Hell cannot touch) at his request, rather than to consign him to an eternity of pain and torment.

Just when Neron seems to be victorious, Satanus finally reveals that he used the war as a cover to spread a modified viral version of DMN, a drug that changes humans into monsters. This variation of DMN transforms Neron and all of Hell's demons into soulless humans except for Lilith, who was not a true demon. This causes all of the demonic entities that Neron has consumed over the millennia to be cast out of him. Satanus then beheads Neron and takes the throne of Hell for himself. The damned then turn their rage upon the now-human and powerless demons, slaughtering them and damning themselves anew.

Blaze later takes advantage of her brother's momentary weakness during a moment when he allows Black Alice to touch him and sample his powers; this action shatters Black Alice's psyche and allows Blaze to drain Satanus' power and take the throne for herself, thus winning the war.

== Collected editions ==
The miniseries was later collected in a trade paperback (DC Comics, October 2009, 256 pp. (ISBN 978-1401223137)).
