= On Wings of Eagles (miniseries) =

- Genre: Drama
- Based on: On Wings of Eagles by Ken Follett
- Screenplay by: Ken Follett and Sam Rolfe
- Directed by: Andrew V. McLaglen
- Starring: Burt Lancaster; Richard Crenna; Paul Le Mat
- Theme music composer: Laurence Rosenthal
- Countries of origin: United States; Mexico
- Original languages: English; Persian
- No. of episodes: 2

Production
- Executive producer: Edgar J. Scherick
- Producer: Lynn Raynor
- Production locations: Mexico City; Toluca, Estado de México, Mexico
- Cinematography: Robert Steadman
- Editor: Alan Strachan
- Running time: 241 minutes
- Production companies: Edgar J. Scherick Associates; Taft Entertainment Television

Original release
- Network: NBC
- Release: May 18 – May 19, 1986

On Wings of Eagles (also known as Teheran) is a 1986 American television miniseries starring Burt Lancaster and Richard Crenna, and directed by Andrew V. McLaglen. It was adapted from Ken Follett's 1983 book of the same name.

== Synopsis ==
The story is set during the Iranian Revolution (1978–1979). As Shah Mohammad Reza Pahlavi is overthrown by Ayatollah Ruhollah Khomeini in the takeover of Iran, two executives of Electronic Data Systems are arrested on false charges and then imprisoned. The head of the company, H. Ross Perot (Richard Crenna), travels to Tehran to negotiate for their release. Meanwhile, a retired US Army Special Forces Colonel, Arthur D. "Bull" Simons (Burt Lancaster), is hired by Perot to formulate a rescue plan at any cost.

== Cast ==
Actor	Role
Burt Lancaster	Colonel Arthur D. "Bull" Simons
Richard Crenna	H. Ross Perot
Paul Le Mat	Jay Coburn
Louis Giambalvo	Paul Chiapparone
Jim Metzler	Bill Gaylord
Lawrence Pressman	Bill Gayden
Esai Morales	Rashid
Martin Doyle	Jim Schwebach
Robert Wightman	Keane Taylor
Cyril O'Reilly	Pat Scully
Bob Delegall	Ron Davis
William Bumiller	Rich Gallagher
James Sutorius	Joe Poche
Richard Anthony Crenna	Ross Perot Jr.
Constance Towers	Margot Perot
Karen Carlson	Ruth Chiapparone
Patrick Collins	John Howell
Roger Cudney	General Jerome O'Malley
Patty McCormack	Liz Coburn
Zevi Wolmark	Ted Maxwell
Kabir Bedi	Mohammad
Parviz Sayyad	Hossein Dadgar
Ellis Levinson	Henry Kissinger (voice)

== Production ==
Edgar Scherick sold the mini series to NBC. He said the paid nearly $1 million for Burt Lancaster, recalling "Burt had just had a bipass operation. I had to pay a big premium for insurance for him. We finished the picture on a mountain near Mexico City and I was concerned about the thinness of the air. I brought an ambulance and doctor in on a 24-hour basis. And he was fine."

== Awards ==
The miniseries was nominated for Outstanding Miniseries at the 38th Primetime Emmy Awards.
