= Lorie Griffin =

American actress

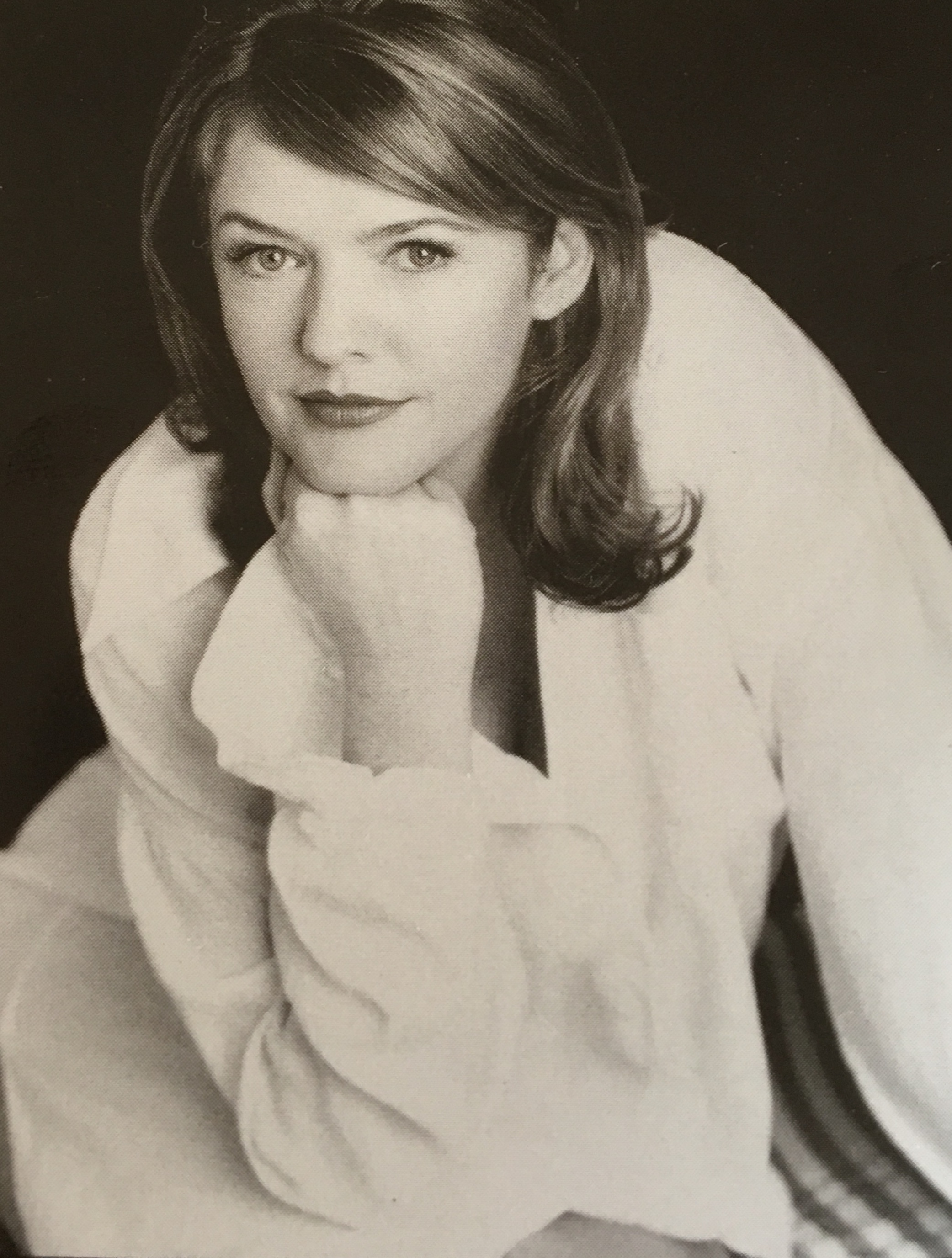
- Born: Dallas, Texas, U.S.
- Occupation(s): Actress, model
- Years active: 1985–1997

Lorie Griffin is an American former film and television actress and model who is best known for her role as Pamela Wells in the movie Teen Wolf. Her filmography includes Cheerleader Camp and Aloha Summer, as well as television guest roles on Charles in Charge and Highway to Heaven.

Griffin's last major role was the 1993 movie Sandman, that also starred Dedee Pfeiffer and was directed by Eric Woster, who died before completing production.

== Filmography ==
- Teen Wolf (1985)
- Cheerleader Camp (1987)
- Highway to Heaven (1987–1989)
- Charles in Charge (1988)
- Aloha Summer (1988)
- Seduction: Three Tales from the Inner Sanctum (1991)
- Sandman (1993)
- The Burning Zone (1997)
