= Lucinda Dickey =

American former dancer and actress

- Born: Lucinda Marie Henninger; July 9, 1960 (age 66); Hutchinson, Kansas, U.S.
- Other name: Lucinda Piligian
- Education: Kansas State University; Roland Dupree Dance Academy
- Occupations: Dancer; Actress
- Years active: 1982–2008
- Spouses: Halley Dickey (divorced); Craig Piligian (m. 1990)
- Children: 2

Lucinda Dickey (born Lucinda Marie Henninger; July 9th, 1960) is an American dancer and actress. She is best known for her leading roles in the film Breakin' (1984) and its sequel Breakin' 2: Electric Boogaloo (1984).

== Early life ==
Dickey was born and raised in Hutchinson, Kansas, where at the age of four, she began dancing in her mother's studio. While attending Kansas State University, she majored in dance and competed as Miss Manhattan/Kansas-State in the Miss Kansas pageant, where she won the talent division and finished third runner-up.

== Career ==
In 1980, Dickey moved to Los Angeles and won a dance scholarship with the Roland DuPree Dance Academy. After 10 months, she became one of the lead dancers for the movie Grease 2. In fall 1982, she landed a stint as a dancer on Solid Gold.

Her first leading role was in Ninja III: The Domination, which premiered in 1984. In 1984, Dickey appeared in the role of jazz dancer turned breakdancer Kelly in Breakin' and its sequel, Breakin' 2: Electric Boogaloo. Next, Dickey played the mascot in the horror flick Cheerleader Camp, in 1988.

Dickey's last onscreen acting role was in the 1990 Perry Mason television movie, Perry Mason: The Case of the Defiant Daughter.

She appeared as a dance judge on TLC's 2008 series Master of Dance.

== Personal life ==
She retired from acting in 1990, and lives in California with her husband, Craig Piligian, a co-executive producer of, among others, the reality TV game show Survivor. They have two children.

== Filmography ==
Film
Year	Title	Role	Notes
1982	Grease 2	Girl Greaser	
1984	Breakin'	Kelly / Special K	
1984	Ninja III: The Domination	Christie	
1984	Breakin' 2: Electric Boogaloo	Kelly	
1988	Cheerleader Camp	Cory Foster	Also choreographer
2014	Electric Boogaloo: The Wild, Untold Story of Cannon Films	Self	Documentary
Television
Year	Title	Role	Notes
1982-1983	Solid Gold	Self (Solid Gold Dancer)	7 episodes
1990	Perry Mason: The Case of the Defiant Daughter	Employee	(TV movie); Uncredited
2008	Master of Dance	Self - Judge	6 episodes

== See also ==
- List of dancers
