= Aloha Summer =

- Theatrical release poster
- Directed by: Tommy Lee Wallace
- Screenplay by: Mike Greco; Bob Benedetto
- Story by: Mike Greco
- Produced by: Mike Greco
- Starring: Chris Makepeace; Yuji Okumoto; Don Michael Paul; Tia Carrere; Andy Bumatai; Lorie Griffin
- Cinematography: Steven Poster
- Edited by: Jay Cassidy; James Coblentz; Jack Hofstra
- Music by: Jesse Frederick; Bennett Salvay
- Distributed by: International Spectrafilm
- Release date: February 26, 1988
- Running time: 97 minutes
- Country: United States
- Language: English
- Box office: $418,379

Aloha Summer is a 1988 American comedy-drama film directed by Tommy Lee Wallace and starring Chris Makepeace, Yuji Okumoto, Tia Carrere and Don Michael Paul. The plot is about a group of teenagers and their experiences one summer in Hawaii.

== Premise ==
In 1959, an American teenager travels from the Contiguous United States to Hawaii with his parents for a vacation and meets five other teenagers. The film follows the teenagers as they learn about surfing, drinking, sex, and friendship.

== Reception ==
Caryn James of The New York Times called it "empty nostalgia done for its own sake". Kevin Thomas of the Los Angeles Times wrote the film surprises viewers with its depth and themes, which include racism. TV Guide wrote, "Though they didn't create a very good movie, the filmmakers had their hearts in the right place, and for that they should be commended."
