= Craig Piligian =

American television producer

- Born: August 25, 1957 (age 69)
- Occupation: Television Producer
- Spouse: Lucinda Dickey (m. 1990)
- Children: 2

Craig Piligian (born August 25, 1957) is an American television producer, and the president and CEO of Pilgrim Films & Television. As an Executive Producer, he is best known for creating The Ultimate Fighter, American Chopper, and Dirty Jobs series for Discovery Channel. In 2001, he won an Emmy Award as co-executive producer of Survivor.

In November 2003, Piligian began producing Dirty Jobs, a series on the Discovery channel that focused on blue-collar jobs. The show ran for eight years and aired over 170 episodes. The show ended in 2012.

In 2004, Piligian worked with Dana White and Lorenzo Fertitta to bring a reality show about mixed martial arts, called The Ultimate Fighter, to television. The reality series followed sixteen fighters who lived in a house and competed for a UFC contract.

In 2012, Piligian was ranked 18th on The Hollywood Reporter's "50 Most Powerful List".

In 2015, Lionsgate purchased a major stake in Piligian's Pilgrim Studios for $200 million.

In March 2016, Piligian partnered with Ben Affleck and Matt Damon to create The Runner, an original series about mobile devices streaming on go90. In 2018, Piligian worked with Roger Ross Williams to develop High on the Hog, a docuseries depicting African American history through the lens of food, based on Dr. Jessica B. Harris’ book High on the Hog: A Culinary Journey from Africa to America.

In April 2021, Piligian was named chair of Pilgrim Media Group and president.

On January 18, 2025, at UFC 311, Piligian was officially announced as an inductee in the Contributor Wing of the 2025 UFC Hall of Fame.

== Personal life ==
He is married to Lucinda Dickey; they have two children. In 2016, Piligian purchased a historical ranch property in Kansas for $5.325 million.
