= Tomboy (1985 film) =

1985 film by Herb Freed

- Theatrical release poster
- Directed by: Herb Freed
- Screenplay by: Herb Freed; Ben Zelig
- Story by: Ben Zelig
- Produced by: Michael D. Castle; Marilyn Jacobs Tenser
- Starring: Betsy Russell; Jerry DiNome; Kristi Somers; Richard Erdman; Philip Sterling
- Cinematography: Daniel Yarussi
- Edited by: Richard E. Westover
- Music by: Michael Lloyd
- Distributed by: Crown International Pictures; BCI Eclipse
- Release date: January 25, 1985
- Running time: 91 minutes
- Country: United States
- Language: English
- Box office: $14,100,000

Tomboy is a 1985 American teen comedy film directed by Herb Freed and starring Betsy Russell.

== Plot ==
The film concerns the life of Tomasina "Tommy" Boyd who works as a mechanic and her hopes to become a stock car driver. When she falls for a visiting, more famous stock car racer, who offends her with his chauvinistic remarks, a car race between the lovers has commenced.

== Main cast ==
- Betsy Russell as Tomasina "Tommy" Boyd / Tomboy
- Gerard Christopher as Randy Starr (credited as Jerry DiNome)
- Kristi Somers as Seville Ritz
- Richard Erdman as Chester
- Philip Sterling as Earl Delarue
- Eric Douglas as Ernie Leeds Jr.
- Paul Gunning as Frankie

== Box office ==
The film was released on January 25, 1985 in 409 theaters in Minnesota, Chicago, Atlanta, Jacksonville, Charlotte, New Orleans, Memphis, Cincinnati and Indianapolis and grossed $1,723,935 in the opening weekend. Its final gross in the US and Canada was $14,100,000.

== Home media ==
Tomboy received it first official DVD release in the United States on August 22, 2006. On September 29, 2009, Mill Creek Entertainment released Tomboy as part of the 'Too Cool for School Collection' which also featured Malibu Beach, Hunk, Cavegirl, The Van, The Pom Pom Girls, My Tutor, Jocks, Coach, The Beach Girls, Weekend Pass, and My Chauffeur. The film was also included in other multi - feature film DVD collections. In 2011, it was released with Malibu Beach, My Chauffeur and Weekend Pass. It was made available in another 4-movie pack with My Tutor, My Chauffeur and Jocks.
