= John Newton (actor) =

American actor (born 1965)

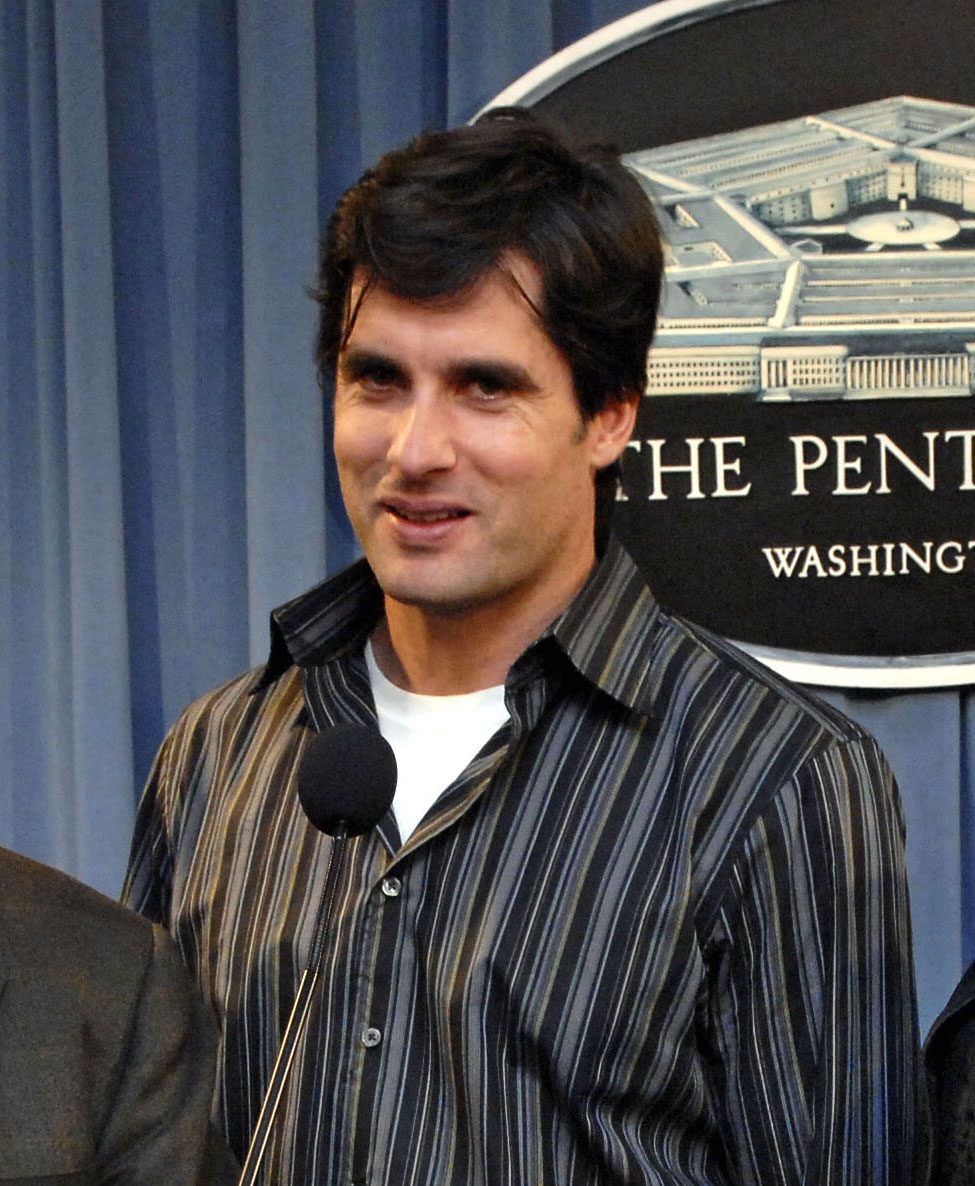
- Newton in 2006
- Born: December 29, 1965 (age 60); Chapel Hill, North Carolina, U.S.
- Occupation: Actor
- Years active: 1988–2016
- Spouse: Jennifer Capps Newton (m. 2006)

John Haymes Newton (born December 29, 1965) is an American former actor. He is known for his regular roles on the television programs Superboy as Clark Kent in the show's first season and as Ryan McBride on the soap opera Melrose Place. He is currently focused on energy healing practices.

== Career ==
Newton is best-known for playing the lead role of Clark Kent/Superboy in the TV series Superboy during the show's first season from 1988 to 1989. He was replaced by Gerard Christopher in the role for the remainder of the show's run. On the DVD release of Superboy: The Complete First Season (released in 2006), Newton appears as himself on the documentary featurette "Superboy: Getting Off the Ground" and provides audio commentary with executive producer Ilya Salkind on two episodes.

Besides Superboy, he played regular roles on the television programs Melrose Place and The Untouchables. He had a recurring role on Models, Inc. before being transferred onto Melrose Place after its cancellation. Both shows were part of the Beverly Hills, 90210 franchise.

He starred in The Christmas Card (2006) and the 2009 independent film Yesterday Was a Lie.

In 2011, Newton and his wife Jennifer lent their voices as Clark Kent/Superman and Lois Lane, respectively, in the animated fan film Superman Classic by animator Robb Pratt.

== Filmography ==
- Superboy (1988–1989)
- Everyday Heroes (1990)
- CBS Schoolbreak Special (1991)
- Cool as Ice (1991)
- Desert Kickboxer (1992)
- Alive (1993)
- The Untouchables (1993)
- Models Inc. (1994)
- Walker, Texas Ranger (1997)
- Goodbye America (1997)
- Viper (1997)
- Dark Tides (1998)
- Melrose Place (1998–1999)
- Operation Sandman (2000)
- Tru Calling (2003) S1-EP1 (Aaron McCann)
- Desperate Housewives (2004)
- The Christmas Card (2006)
- S.S. Doomtrooper (2006)
- The Haunting of Molly Hartley (2008)
- Yesterday Was a Lie (2009)
- Superman Classic (2011)
- The Mentalist (2011)
- Bizarro Classic (2012)
- Flash Gordon Classic (2015)
