= Yellow Peri =

- Superboy and Yellow Peri as depicted in The New Adventures of Superboy #34. Art by Ross Andru.

Publication information
- Publisher: DC Comics
- First appearance: The New Adventures of Superboy #34 (October 1982)
- Created by: Bob Rozakis (writer); Kurt Schaffenberger (artist)

In-story information
- Alter ego: Loretta York
- Species: Human
- Abilities: Expertise in occultism; Adept magic user

Yellow Peri (Loretta York) is a fictional character published by DC Comics, who is able to use magic thanks to a book of spells. The character first appeared in The New Adventures of Superboy #34 (October 1982), and was created by Bob Rozakis and Kurt Schaffenberger.

== Fictional character biography ==
Loretta York became interested in magic as a young child. As a teenager, she investigates a burned down bookstore, where she finds a spellbook that had survived the fire. Using this book, Loretta becomes Yellow Peri, and used her new powers to help people. However, these gestures of help often backfired. She soon joined a traveling circus and eventually wound up in Smallville, where she encountered Superboy. Superboy eventually throws the magic book into space, with Loretta losing all memories of her time as Yellow Peri.

When Loretta is an adult, the book returns from space and crashed into her home. She becomes Yellow Peri and again encountered Superboy, now known as Superman. Loretta had since married to Alvin Grant, who intended to use her powers for his benefit. Superman displays contempt for Grant and attacks him with his ice breath, freezing him in a lake.

=== Reign in Hell ===
In the series Reign in Hell, Yellow Peri appears in Hell after the realm of "Purgatory" invades. She is helping Doctor Occult find his former partner, Rose Psychic. Peri's legs have been eaten by demons below the knee, forcing Occult to carry her around.

=== Brightest Day ===
Yellow Peri appears in the series Brightest Day as one of numerous superhumans under the control of the Starheart. She has regained her legs.

== Powers and abilities ==
Loretta York derives all her powers from a magic book she found. Yellow Peri is able to read and use its spells by touching one hand on her forehead or the book itself.

== In other media ==
Yellow Peri appears in the Superboy episode "Yellow Peri's Spell of Doom", portrayed by Elizabeth Keifer. This version is a waitress who is infatuated with Superboy and gained powers from a deal she made with the magical being Gazook. She comes into conflict with Superboy after she attempts to use her powers to make him fall in love with her, and attempts to kill the woman he did love, Lana Lang. Peri is eventually defeated by Superboy and loses her powers after he destroys the doll housing Gazook's spirit.
