= Cheerleader Camp =

- Theatrical release poster
- Directed by: John Quinn
- Written by: David Lee Fein; R.L. O'Keefe
- Produced by: Jeff Prettyman; John Quinn
- Starring: Betsy Russell; Leif Garrett; Lucinda Dickey; Lorie Griffin
- Cinematography: Bryan England
- Edited by: Jeffrey Reiner
- Music by: Murielle Hodler-Hamilton; Joel Hamilton
- Production companies: Quinn/Prettyman; Prism Entertainment; Daiei Company Ltd.; Bloody Pom Poms Productions, Inc.
- Distributed by: Prism Entertainment
- Release date: November 16, 1988
- Running time: 89 minutes
- Country: United States
- Language: English

Cheerleader Camp is a 1988 American slasher film produced and directed by John Quinn in his directorial debut, and starring Betsy Russell, Leif Garrett, Lucinda Dickey, and Lorie Griffin. The film follows a troubled young woman who arrives at a cheerleader summer camp for a competition, where a series of murders begin to occur.

Production of Cheerleader Camp began in 1987. It was originally intended to be filmed in Oregon, but was instead shot largely in Camp Nelson, California, and in the Sequoia National Forest. The film was given a brief theatrical release in early 1988 under the title Bloody Pom Poms before Prism Entertainment released it on video in November 1988.

== Plot ==
Cheerleader Alison is tormented by nightmares revolving an impending cheerleading competition. She arrives at cheerleader camp to train with her teammates, where she rooms with the mascot, Cory, who is often ridiculed by the cheerleaders and Camp Hurrah's head coach Miss Tipton; Alison's boyfriend, Brent, immediately begins flirting with a blonde cheerleader named Suzy. The girls go to the river where they sunbathe, and are spied on by Tim, a member of Alison's cheering team. Also watching them is Sheriff Poucher, who gets interrupted by the camp handyman, Pop.

The next morning, Alison finds Suzy in her cabin with her wrists cut, dead of an apparent suicide. The next day, Alison goes into the kitchen walk-in refrigerator in search of a drink and discovers Suzy's corpse on a shelf. The police are called, and Miss Tipton explains to Sheriff Poucher that, in order to protect her job, she did not want to report Suzy's death until the program was finished. The Sheriff assures Tipton that he will take care of the matter, and the deal is sealed by the pair having sex, an act which is caught on video by Tim. As the result of a prank, the sex tape is broadcast the next day instead of a video of the camp's cheer routines.

In the meantime, Brent has begun to flirt with teammate Pam, concerning Alison. Alison has a nightmare in which she cheers along with a group of mascots as Brent has sex with Pam. At the river the next day, Brent and Pam leave to have sex. They argue, however, and he leaves Pam in the woods where she is murdered with garden shears by an unseen killer. That evening, Alison has a dream in which she kills Pam. The next day at the competition, Alison worries that she may have hurt Pam in a fit of rage and not remembered it. She mentions this to Cory who assures her that she slept through the night.

On the day of the competition, Pam is nowhere to be found. Cory competes in the mascot dance contest, but the competition is awarded to another by Tipton. During the team's improvised routine, Tim falls offstage, knocking Pop to the ground in the process, prompting the handyman to declare, "I hope you die!" During the Camp Queen competition, Theresa, who has become increasingly worried about Pam, goes to find her. Cory and Brent follow separately into the woods to look for Pam and Theresa, and Miss Tipton sends Pop to search for her as well. Theresa finds Pam's body in the woods, and is chased down by a van before getting crushed against a tree.

In the meantime, Alison and Bonnie compete for title of Queen, which Bonnie wins. Tim manages to impress a cheerleader from another team and takes her outside to have sex with her. He returns almost immediately with his hand covered in blood and reveals that he has found Theresa's body. Brent announces at the party that there is a killer on the loose, prompting the cheerleaders to panic and flee in their cars. Miss Tipton stumbles drunkenly into the woods to search for Pam, but she is soon killed. Alison, Cory, Bonnie, Tim, and Brent try to drive away, only to discover that their car has been tampered with, rendering it undriveable.

The four hear gunshots in the woods, causing them to run separate directions; Alison returns to the van followed by Brent, Bonnie, and Cory, who claims someone attacked her in the woods. Brent retrieves Timmy's video camera in the woods, where they watch Timmy being killed on tape. The four set a booby trap using a bear trap in the tool shed, which inadvertently kills the Sheriff. They then encounter Pop, armed with a shotgun; Cory accuses Pop to be the killer and shoots him with a revolver. Back at the camp, Cory and Bonnie go to call the police, leaving Brent alone with Alison. He attempts to have sex with her, but she resists. Cory stumbles in, saying she can't find Bonnie; Brent goes to look for her and Cory tells Alison she thinks Brent may be the killer. Armed with the revolver, Cory sends Alison to shoot Brent. They find him standing over Bonnie's corpse and Alison shoots him. When the police arrive, they charge a distraught Allison with the murders. Cory supports this, claiming that Alison would have done anything to be number one. In the ambulance, Alison insists she only killed Brent, but the detective says that Cory blamed all the murders on her. Alison screams as she is taken away while Cory, dressed in a cheerleading uniform, cheers in front of the camp at dawn.

== Cast ==
- Betsy Russell as Alison Wentworth
- Leif Garrett as Brent Hoover
- Lucinda Dickey as Cory Foster
- Lorie Griffin as Bonnie Reed
- Buck Flower as Pop
- Travis McKenna as Timmy Moser
- Teri Weigel as Pam Bently
- Rebecca Ferratti as Theresa Salazar
- Vickie Benson as Miss Tipton
- Jeff Prettyman as Sheriff Poucher
- Krista Pflanzer as Suzy
- Craig Piligian as Detective
- William Johnson, Sr. as Chief Ronnie
- Kathryn Litton as Timmy's Girlfriend
- Tom Habeeb as Assistant Detective
- John Quinn as Ambulance Attendant
- Chris Prettyman, Mike Knox, Frank Reinfield and Dave Delgado as The Band Members

== Production ==
According to a Los Angeles Times article, the film was slated to be shot in Oregon in September 1987, though filming took place primarily at Camp Nelson and the Sequoia National Forest, as well as Bakersfield, California. The film was loosely based on the murder of Kirsten Costas in 1984.

== Release ==
In a review in Variety, the reviewer credited as "Gerz." stated the film played theatrically for about a week in early 1988 under the title Bloody Pom Poms on its release by Atlantic Releasing.

=== Critical response ===
From contemporary reviews, "Gerz." in Variety noted that the film had a "Paper-thin plot" while stating that "the largely attractive cast does well with sparse material, particularly Russel and Dickey".

Online movie guide AllMovie awarded the film one out of five stars, calling it "routine" and writing: "Cheerleader Camp won't hold pleasure for any except the most dedicated Z-level celebrity watchers." TV Guide awarded the film one out of four stars, writing: "Released theatrically as Bloody Pom Poms, but available on home video as Cheerleader Camp, this obscure low budget effort seeks to combine two classics of exploitation: the T&A cheerleader movie and the slice-and-dice splatter film."

=== Home media ===
The film was released by Prism Entertainment on video cassette on November 16, 1988.

Anchor Bay Entertainment released the film on DVD on August 3, 2004.

== Related works ==
A sequel was planned by the filmmakers, but the project was eventually made into an unrelated film, Camp Fear (1991), which was produced and financed by another production team. A film based on the original sequel outline, Cheerleader Camp: To The Death, was released in 2014.

== Sources ==
- Gerz. (1991). Variety's Film Reviews 1987-1988. Vol. 20. R. R. Bowker. There are no page numbers in this book. This entry is found under the header "November 16, 1988". ISBN 0-8352-2667-0.
