= Zevi Wolmark =

American actor (born 1962)

- Born: Zevi Wolmark; August 19, 1962 (age 63); San Francisco, California, U.S.
- Other names: Stewart Wolmark
- Occupations: Actor, artist
- Years active: 1980–present

Zevi Wolmark (born August 19, 1962) is an American film and theatre actor and artist. His on-screen career was at its peak in the late 1980s and early 1990s. He is chiefly known for his appearance in the 1988 TV Series Superboy.

== Biography ==
Zevi Wolmark was born in San Francisco, northern California. He studied acting at the Juilliard School in New York City where he also launched his career performing in off-Broadway shows. By the late 1980s, Wolmark had moved to the big screen. During his career he has appeared in more than a dozen film and TV productions.

== Filmography ==
Year	Title	Actor	Self	Role
1986	Crossings	Yes		Ken Richmond
1986	On Wings of Eagles	Yes		Ted Maxwell
1986	A Year in the Life	Yes		Tyler Davis
1988	Super Scary Saturday	Yes		Grandson Tim
1988–1989	War and Remembrance	Yes		John Simms
1990–1992	Superboy	Yes		Christopher Grimes
2011–2012	Welcome to Sweetie Pie's	Yes	Yes	Himself
2012–2013	The Situation	Yes		Stewart
