= Gerard Christopher =

American actor

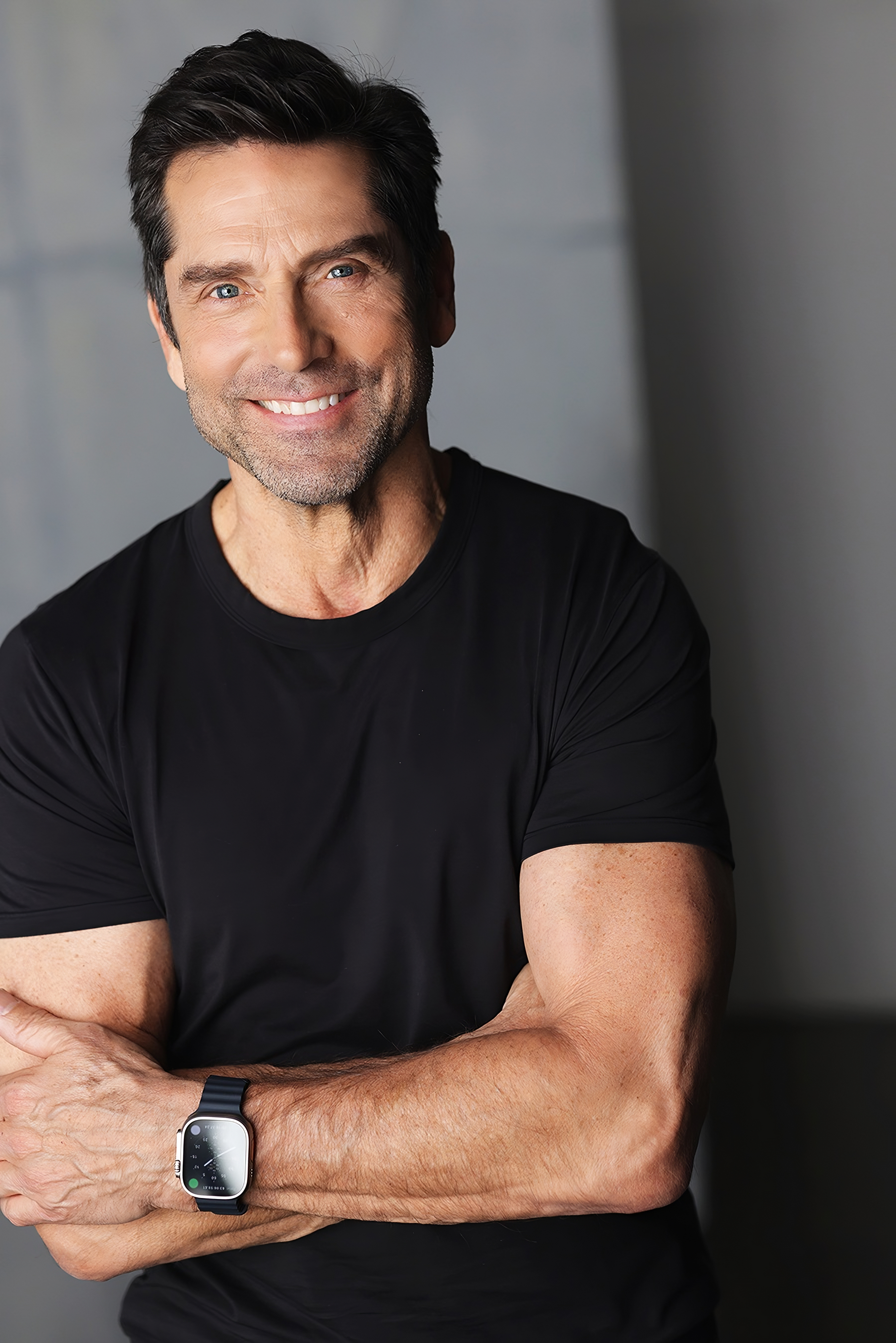
- Born: May 11, 1959 (age 66); New York City, US
- Occupations: Actor; writer; producer
- Years active: 1984–present

Gerard Christopher (born May 11, 1959) is an American actor, writer and producer. He was the second actor to play Superboy in the television series Superboy (from 1989 to 1992), replacing John Haymes Newton, who played the role in season one. During his tenure he would later also be a producer and writer on the series. He has performed in a number of telemovies and was a guest star on daytime soap operas such as Days of Our Lives and Sunset Beach, and the prime-time soap opera Melrose Place. He has also starred in the comedy movie Tomboy (1985).

Christopher auditioned for the part of Superman / Clark Kent in Lois & Clark: The New Adventures of Superman and was chosen by the casting director. When the producers learned he had essentially already played the role, he was dismissed in favor of Dean Cain.

His most recent film role (as of 2003) was "Zack" in the movie The First of May (1999). He also appeared as himself on the 2006 television documentary Look, Up in the Sky: The Amazing Story of Superman talking about his time on Superboy.
