= Sherman Howard =

American actor

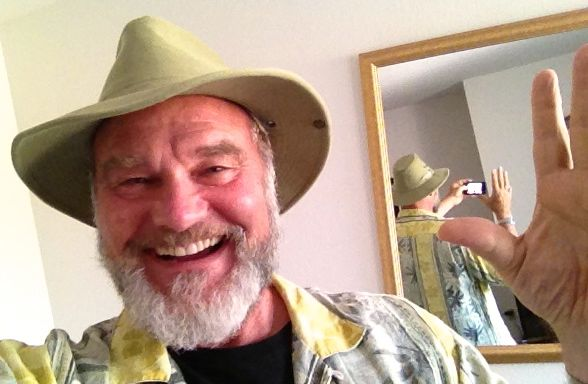
- Howard in 2014
- Born: June 11, 1949 (age 77); Chicago, Illinois, U.S.
- Education: American Conservatory Theater (1971)
- Occupation: Actor
- Years active: 1971–present
- Spouse: Donna Bullock (m. 1988)
- Children: 1

Sherman Howard (born June 11, 1949) is an American actor. He is best known for his performance as the zombie Bub in George A. Romero's Day of the Dead (1985) and Lex Luthor on Superboy (1990–1992). He also voiced Derek Powers / Blight in Batman Beyond (1999–2001).

== Theatre ==
Howard began his career at the American Conservatory Theater (ACT) in San Francisco in 1971. While a member of ACT's repertory company, he appeared in the roles of Glendenning in David Storey's The Contractor, the archangel Gabriel in Nagle Jackson's The Mystery Cycle, James in Harold Pinter's The Collection, and Gratiano in The Merchant of Venice, along with roles in both Antony and Cleopatra and Caesar and Cleopatra. He appeared as Archie in Tom Stoppard's Jumpers in the premiere season of Chicago's Northlight Theatre Company.

While a member of the resident company at the Actors Theatre of Louisville for three seasons during the mid-70s, he played the role of Lucius in Jon Jory's Andronicus: A Space Musical, and had roles in The Runner Stumbles, The Front Page, The Resistible Rise of Arturo Ui, and the European tour of Marsha Norman's Getting Out. His off-Broadway credits include Shel Silverstein's The Crate and The Lady or the Tiger Show as well as Sam Shepard's Geography of a Horse Dreamer at the Ensemble Studio Theatre, along with I'm Not Rappaport at the Roundabout Theatre Company. He appeared in Titus Andronicus and Tell Out My Soul at The Public Theater, and in Lillian Hellman's Another Part of the Forest at the Pecadillo Theatre. He most recently appeared in the title role of "Bauer" by Lauren Gunderson at 59 E 59th St in New York City.

His regional credits include Prospero in The Tempest, King Henry in The Lion in Winter, Spooner in No Man's Land, and Lopakhin in The Cherry Orchard at the Shakespeare Theatre of New Jersey (STNJ), where he has also appeared in the title roles of both Bertolt Brecht's Life of Galileo and Luigi Pirandello's Henry IV (Enrico IV). He also appeared as Scrooge in the STNJ's production of A Christmas Carol. He played the role of Benedick in Much Ado About Nothing, opposite his wife, Donna Bullock, as Beatrice. He played the title roles in both Hamlet and Macbeth at the Kentucky Shakespeare Festival and the North Carolina Shakespeare Festival, respectively. He appeared in the title role of Sheridan at the La Jolla Playhouse. He appeared in The Price at the Pittsburgh Public Theater and in Nine Armenians at the Intiman Theater in Seattle. His Broadway credits include Bengal Tiger at the Baghdad Zoo, All My Sons, Inherit the Wind, and Gore Vidal's The Best Man. He recently concluded a run at the Old Globe Theatre in San Diego as The Player in Tom Stoppard's Rosencrantz and Guildenstern Are Dead and appeared in "The Second Mrs. Wilson" at George Street Playhouse under the direction of Gordon Edelstein.

Howard also has a passion for concert hall music. In their 2013/14 season, he performed with the Philadelphia Orchestra in Sergei Rachmaninoff's The Bells conducted by Vladimir Jurowski. He also appeared in the role of Prospero in the New Jersey Symphony Orchestra's presentation of Jean Sibelius' The Tempest Suite conducted by Jacque Lacombe. He has performed Richard Strauss's Enoch Arden with concert pianist David Kaplan at Bargemusic in Brooklyn and Metropolis Ensemble in Manhattan.

== Personal life ==
Howard has been married to actress Donna Bullock since May 1988. They have one daughter, Hannah Sherman.

== Filmography ==
=== Film ===
Year	Title	Role	Notes
1974	Cyrano de Bergerac	Jodelet / Cadet	Television film
1984	Grace Quigley	Alan	Credited as Howard Sherman
1985	Day of the Dead	Bub	Credited as Howard Sherman
1988	Necessity	Jack Martinelli	Television film
1988	The House on Carroll Street	Boria	Credited as Howard Sherman
1989	Casualties of War	Court Martial President	
1989	Lethal Weapon 2	Hitman #3	
1989	K-9	Dillon	
1989	Three Fugitives	Canadian Police Officer	Uncredited
1990	I Come in Peace	Victor Manning	
1991	Ricochet	Public Defender Kiley	
1993	The Hit List	Bishop	
1995	Tom Clancy's Op Center	Uri Stalipin	Television film
1995	Problem Child 3: Junior in Love	Scoutmaster Eugene Phlim	Television film
1997	Retroactive	State Trooper Parker	
1998	Dante's View	Jesus	
1998	An American Tail: The Treasure of Manhattan Island	Police Chief McBrusque (voice)	Drect-to-video
1998	The Jungle Book: Mowgli's Story	Shere Khan (voice)	Direct-to-video
1999	An American Tail: The Mystery of the Night Monster	Haggis (voice)	Direct-to-video
2001	The Man from Elysian Fields	Paul Pearson	
2004	Debating Robert Lee	Mr. Moffat	
2004	Eulogy	Funeral Director	
2007	You Belong to Me	Stuart	
2016	The Hudson Tribes	Abraham	
2018	Beyond the Night	Burg Connely	

=== Television ===
Year	Title	Role	Notes
1973–1974	General Hospital	Professor Gordon Bradford Gray	Recurring; Unknown episodes
1984	Celebrity	Director	Miniseries
1986	Tales from the Darkside	Arnold Barker	Episode: "Fear of Floating"
1986–1987	Ryan's Hope	Vinnie Vincent	Unknown episodes
1987	Max Headroom	Simon Peller	3 episodes
1987	One Life to Live	Rolo Fernandez	Episode #1.4744
1988	Dallas	Japhet Harper	5 episodes
1989	Baywatch	Dick	Episode: "Shelter Me"
1989	Freddy's Nightmares	Dr. Lynch	Episode: "Monkey Dreams"
1989	L.A. Law	Ed Haley	Episode: "One Rat, One Ranger"
1989	Miami Vice	Colonel Andrew Baker	Episode: "Freefall"
1989	Unsub	Dr. Radford	Episode: "And They Swam Right Over the Dam"
1989–1992	Superboy	Lex Luthor, Warren Eckworth	17 episodes
1990	The Young Riders	Marshall Cole Lambert	Episode: "Blood Money"
1990	Star Trek: The Next Generation	Captain Endar	Episode: "Suddenly Human"
1990	Parker Lewis Can't Lose	Mr. Martin Lloyd "Marty" Lewis	Pilot
1990	ALF	Officer	Episode: "Consider Me Gone"
1991	Good & Evil	Roger	6 episodes
1991	Quantum Leap	Hank Rickett	Episode: "Runaway - July 4, 1964"
1992	Major Dad	Kip	Episode: "Old Acquaintance"
1992	Melrose Place	Hal Barber	2 episodes
1992	Rachel Gunn, R.N.	Dr. Bledsoe	Episode: "To Plea or Not to Plea"
1992	Santa Barbara	Professor Simon James	3 episodes
1993	Good Advice	Weinblatt	Episode: "Sunshine on My Shoulder"
1993	Seinfeld	Roy	Episode: "The Junior Mint"
1993	Raven	Stephen Kane	Episode: "Heat"
1993	Space Rangers	Prince Gor'Dah	Episode: "Death Before Dishonor"
1994	Diagnosis: Murder	Joseph Talbot	Episode: "Lily"
1994	The Stand	Dr. Dietz	Episode: "The Plague"
1994	Fortune Hunter	Zedek	Episode: "Hot Ice"
1994	seaQuest 2032	Packard	Episode: "When We Dead Awaken"
1995	Op Center	Uri Stalipin	Miniseries
1995	Sliders	Hendrick	Episode: "Prince of Wails"
1995	Star Trek: Deep Space Nine	Syvar	Episode: "Shakaar"
1995–1997	Walker, Texas Ranger	Mr. Burrows, Sonny Lyle	2 episodes
1996	Superman: The Animated Series	Steppenwolf, The Preserver (voice)	3 episodes
1996	The Client	Yuri	Episode: "Winning"
1996	Mad About You	Explorer Channel Executive	2 episodes
1996	Home Improvement	Howard	Episode: "Workshop 'Til You Drop"
1996	The Burning Zone	Dr. Elton Greenleaf	Episode: "Lethal Injection"
1996	The Jeff Foxworthy Show	Harvey	Episode: "The Practical Joke"
1996	Renegade	Bishop	Episode: "The Pipeline"
1996–1999	Jumanji	Van Pelt (voice)	21 episodes
1997	Men in Black: The Series	Buzzard (voice)	2 episodes
1997	ER	Mr. Schoenberger	Episode: "Ambush"
1997	Malcolm & Eddie	Tom "Tow Tom"	Episode: "Jingle Fever"
1997	Life with Roger	Chamberlain	Episode: "Toy Story"
1997	Nash Bridges	Jack Conrad	Episode: "The Counterfeiters"
1997	Pacific Blue	Franklin Quill	Episode: "Soft Targets"
1998	Sabrina the Teenage Witch	Dr. Terdlington	Episode: "The Band Episode"
1998–1999	The Secret Files of the Spy Dogs	Additional voices	13 episodes
1999	Batman Beyond	Derek Powers / Blight (voice)	6 episodes
1999	Timon & Pumbaa	Wolf (voice)	Episode: "Steel Hog/Dealer's Choice Cut"
1999–2008	Law & Order	Judge Josiah Bell, Carlton Radford's Attorney	2 episodes
2001	Invader Zim	Oog-Oh (voice)	Episode: "Planet Jackers"
2001	Star Trek: Voyager	T'Greth	Episode: "Prophecy"
2002	Charmed	Clyde	Episode: "A Paige from the Past"
2003	The Mummy	Captain Horoth (voice)	Episode: "Time Before Time"
2003	Cold Case	Tim Dorn	Episode: "Look Again"
2003	Las Vegas	Vanko	Episode: "Decks and Violence"
2004	Malcolm in the Middle	Ivan Pozefsky	Episode: "Malcolm Dates a Family"
2011	Homeland	Chip Shooter Haigh	Episode: "The Good Soldier"
2011	Person of Interest	Steiler	Episode: "Foe"
2015	Madam Secretary	Prime Minister Spiros Georgiou	Episode: "Spartan Figures"
2016	The Blacklist	Peter Pruitt	Episode: "Alexander Kirk (No. 14)"
2017	The Good Fight	Ethan	Episode: "Inauguration"
2019	The Code	General Geiger	2 episodes
2021	Blue Bloods	Christian Ward	Episode: "Guardian Angels"

=== Video games ===
Year	Title	Role	Notes
1997	Lands of Lore: Guardians of Destiny	Belial, Filmmaker #1, Ssar Priest	
2002	Red Faction II	Sopot	
2002	Run Like Hell	Miner #1	
2002	Summoner 2	Azraman	
2002	Command & Conquer: Renegade	Additional voices	
2002	Pirates: The Legend of Black Kat	Ice Demon, Blackbeard	
2003	Devil May Cry 2	Arius	
2003	Jak II	Kor	
2005	Jade Empire	Death's Hand, Prefect Jitong	
2006	Daxter	Kor	
2010	Red Dead Redemption	Oliver Philips, Aldous Worthington	
2011	Star Wars: The Old Republic	Additional voices	
