= List of The Cannon Group films =

This is a list of films released by The Cannon Group, a defunct group of companies – including Cannon Films – which operated from 1967 to 1994.

== Dewey-Friedland Cannon ==
The following are films that were produced and/or released by Cannon Films founders Christopher Dewey and Dennis Friedland who ran Cannon from October 23, 1967, to May 1979.
Release Date	Title	Production	Distribution	Ref
April 12, 1967	Take Her by Surprise	A Somerset Films Production	Cannon Productions	
October 1967	The Love Rebellion	A Cannon Production	Cannon Film Distributors	
1968	Seven Days Too Long	A Cannon Production	Cannon Releasing Corporation	
February 1968	Deep Inside	A Cannon Production	Cannon Film Distributors	
October 1968	The Wicked Die Slow	A Cannon Production	Cannon Film Distributors	
November 20, 1968	Inga	An Inskafilm Ltd. Picture / A Cannon Production (US dubbed version)	Cinemation Industries	
1969	Scratch Harry	A Cannon Production	Cannon Releasing Corporation	
March 1969	To Ingrid, My Love, Lisa	A Cannon Production (US dubbed version)	Cannon Releasing Corporation	
February 2, 1970	Fando y Lis	A Panic Production	Cannon Group / Cannon Releasing Corporation	
February 4, 1970	All Together Now	A House on 69th Street Production	Cannon Releasing Corporation	
May 27, 1970	The Dreamer	A Toda Films Production	Cannon Releasing Corporation	
July 15, 1970	Joe	A Cannon Production	Cannon Releasing Corporation	
August 1970	The Beast in the Cellar	A Tigon British Production in association with Leander Films Ltd.	Cannon Releasing Corporation	
1971	South of Hell Mountain	A Cannon Production	Cannon Releasing Corporation	
January 1971	Fury on Wheels	A Cannon Production	Cannon Releasing Corporation	
January 1971	The Blood on Satan's Claw	A Tigon British / Chilton Film Production	Cannon Releasing Corporation	
May 19, 1971	Guess What We Learned in School Today?	A Cannon Production	Cannon Releasing Corporation	
July 19, 1971	Crucible of Horror	An Abacus Productions / London-Cannon Films Production	Cannon Releasing Corporation	
August 1, 1971	Cauldron of Blood	A Robert D. Weinbach Production	Cannon Releasing Corporation	
November 3, 1971	Maid in Sweden	A Cannon Production	Cannon Releasing Corporation	
November 12, 1971	Who Killed Mary What's 'Er Name?	A Cannon Production	Cannon Releasing Corporation	
March 16, 1972	Face-Off	An Agincourt International / John F. Bassett Production	Cannon Releasing Corporation	
July 1972	Au Pair Girls	A Kenneth Shipman Production	Cannon Group Inc.	
October 27, 1972	Goodbye Uncle Tom	A Euro International Films S.p.A. Production		
November 10, 1972	The Limit	A New Era Communications Production	Cannon/New Era Communications	
November 17, 1972	Silent Night, Bloody Night	A Cannon Production in association with Jeffrey Konvitz Productions	Cannon Releasing Corporation	
1973	Five Minutes of Freedom	A Ross Hagen Production	Cannon Releasing Corporation	
January 1973	The No Mercy Man	A John Proffitt Films Production	Cannon Group Inc.	
April 1973	I, Monster	An Amicus Production	Cannon Releasing Corporation	
September 1973	Fist to Fist	A Jimmy L. Pascual Production	Cannon Group Inc.	
October 1973	The Thunder Kick	A Far East Motion Picture Company Production	Cannon Group Inc.	
1974	Challenge of the Dragon	Wah Ngai Film International Company	Cannon Group Inc.	
1974	The Godfathers of Hong Kong	A World Film Company Production	Cannon Group Inc.	
1974	Secrets of a Door-to-Door Salesman	An Oppidan Film Production	Cannon Releasing Corporation	
January 1974	The Blockhouse	A Galactacus Production		
March 1974	The Butterfly Affair	A Sofracima-Audifilm / Fida Cinematografica Co-Production	Cannon Group Inc.	
1975	The Godfather Squad	An Eternal Film Company Production	Cannon Group Inc.	
March 1975	I Kiss the Hand	An Aquila Cinematografica Production		
May 8, 1975	The Happy Hooker	A Cannon Production	Cannon-Happy Distribution Co., Inc.	
July 11, 1975	The Love Pill	A Mayfair Film Productions Ltd. Production	Cannon Film Distributors (US)	
October 17, 1975	The Red Queen Kills Seven Times	A Phoenix Cinematografica / Romano Film G.M.B.H / Traian Boeru Co-Production	Cannon Group Inc. (US)	
October 17, 1975	Blood Bath	A Trans Orient Entertainment Corporation Production	Cannon Group Inc. (US)	
1976	The Yum-Yum Girls	A Gary Moscato Production	Cannon Releasing Corporation	
March 1976	Northville Cemetery Massacre	A William Dear / Thomas L. Dyke Production	Cannon Group Inc.	
April 11, 1976	The Zebra Force	A Joe Tornatore Production		
July 1976	Little Girl... Big Tease	A Hostage Company Production	Cannon Group Inc.	
July 1976	Mako: The Jaws of Death	A William Grefe Production	Cannon Group Inc.	
September 1976	Slumber Party '57	A Movie Machine, Inc. & Athena Film Co. Production	Cannon Group Inc.	
November 1976	The Ups and Downs of a Handyman	A K.F.R. Production		
1977	Secrets of a Superstud	A Meadway International Productions / S.R.E. Film Group Production	Cannon Group Inc.	
June 1977	2076 Olympiad	An Aragon Production Company / J R Martin Media Production		
June 16, 1977	Cherry Hill High	An Alex E. Goitein Production	Cannon Group Inc.	
July 15, 1977	The Happy Hooker Goes to Washington	A William A. Levey Production	Cannon Releasing Corporation	
July 28, 1977	Mustang: House of Pleasure	An RG Productions II Presentation	Cannon Releasing Corporation	
1978	The Alaska Wilderness Adventure	A Fred Meader Production	Cannon Releasing Corporation	
September 1978	Cheerleaders Beach Party	A Dennis Murphy / Alex E. Goitein Production	Cannon Releasing Corporation	
May 7, 1979	The Swap	A Christopher C. Dewey Production	Cannon Releasing Corporation (Re-release)	

== Golan-Globus Pre-Cannon ==
The following are films produced by Menahem Golan and Yoram Globus (Noah Films) before purchasing Cannon Films in May 1979 that were co-produced and/or released by Dewey-Friedland's Cannon or subsequently released under Golan-Globus' Cannon.
Release Date	Title	Production	Distribution	Ref
1970	Eagles Attack at Dawn	A Golan-Globus Production	Cannon / Rank Video (UK) (1980s)	
January 13, 1971	Lupo!	A Noah Films - Cannon Group Production	Cannon Releasing Corporation (USA)	
April 14, 1971	Margo	A Yoram Globus Production	Cannon Releasing Corporation (USA)	
1972	Escape to the Sun	A Golan-Globus Production	Cannon / Rank Video (UK) (1980s)	
1972	The Great Telephone Robbery	A Yoram Globus Production	Cannon / Rank Video (UK) (1980s)	
1973	Daughters, Daughters	A Golan-Globus Production	Cannon / Rank Video (UK) (1980s)	
October 1976	The Passover Plot	A Wolf Schmidt/Golan-Globus Production	Atlas Film Corporation (1976) / Cannon Video (1989)	
March 1977	God's Gun	A Golan-Globus Film/A Rovi Production	Cannon Video (1989)	
August 1977	Kid Vengeance	A Golan-Globus Production	Cannon Video (1989)	
February 11, 1978	Lemon Popsicle	A Golan-Globus Production	Hafbo (Netherlands) / Cannon Video (International)	
June 1979	My Mother the General	A Golan-Globus / Noah Films Production	Cannon International / Tohokushinsha Vap Video (1980s)	

== Golan-Globus Cannon 1970s ==
The following are films released under the new Golan-Globus ownership of Cannon in the second half of 1979, including some earlier Golan-Globus films that they re-released under their new Cannon label.
Release Date	Title	Production	Distribution	Ref
1979	The Uranium Conspiracy	A Golan-Globus Production	Cannon Film Distributors	
1979	American Raspberry	A Marc Trabulus Production	Cannon Film Distributors	
May 1979	American Nitro	A Bill Kimberlin, Jim Kimberlin, and Tim Geideman Production	Cannon Film Distributors	
May 23, 1979	Operation Thunderbolt	A Golan-Globus Production	Cannon Group (US re-release)	
June 28, 1979	Gas Pump Girls	A David A. Davies Production	Cannon Film Distributors	
June 28, 1979	Incoming Freshmen	A Hi-Test Films Production	Cannon Film Distributors	
August 1979	Savage Weekend	A David Paulsen Production	Cannon Film Distributors	
August 17, 1979	Going Steady	A Golan-Globus Production	Cannon Group (US release)	
November 9, 1979	The Magician of Lublin	A Golan-Globus Presentation of an N. F. Geria III Production	Cannon Group (US release)	

== Golan-Globus Cannon 1980s ==
=== Productions ===
The following are films produced by Cannon under the leadership of co-owners Menahem Golan and Yoram Globus during the 1980s.
Release Date	Title	Production	Presented By	Ref
January 11, 1980	The Godsend	A Cannon Production	Cannon Group Inc.	
March 21, 1980	Hot T-Shirts	A Cannon Production	Cannon Group Inc.	
May 10, 1980	The Happy Hooker Goes Hollywood	A Golan-Globus Production	Cannon Group Inc.	
September 12, 1980	Schizoid	A Golan-Globus Production	Cannon Group Inc.	
October 1980	Seed of Innocence	A Golan-Globus Production	Cannon Group Inc.	
October 1980	Dr. Heckyl and Mr. Hype	A Golan-Globus Production	Cannon Group Inc.	
November 21, 1980	The Apple	A Golan-Globus Production	Cannon Group Inc.	
December 19, 1980	New Year's Evil	A Golan-Globus Production	Cannon Group Inc.	
1981	Hot Bubblegum (Shifshuf Naim)	A Golan-Globus Production	Cannon Group Inc.	
May 8, 1981	Deathhouse (Silent Night, Bloody Night)	A Cannon Production In association with Jeffrey Konvitz Productions	Cannon Group Inc. (US re-release)	
October 2, 1981	Enter the Ninja	A Golan-Globus Production	Cannon Group Inc.	
October 9, 1981	Body and Soul	A Golan-Globus Production	Cannon Group Inc.	
October 16, 1981	Hospital Massacre (aka X-Ray)	A Golan-Globus Production	Cannon Group Inc.	
1982	Private Popsicle (Sapiches)	A Golan-Globus Production	Cannon Group Inc.	
1984	Boy Takes Girl (Ben Loke'ah Bat)	An Avi Kleinberger / Gideon Amir Production	Cannon International, Inc.	
1982	The Secret of Yolanda (Ahava Ilemeth)	A Golan-Globus Production	Cannon Group Inc.	
February 19, 1982	Death Wish II	A Golan-Globus / Landers-Roberts Production for City Films Ltd.	Menahem Golan & Yoram Globus	
May 7, 1982	Lady Chatterley's Lover	A London-Cannon Films Ltd. and Producteurs Associés Co-Production	Menahem Golan & Yoram Globus	
July 30, 1982	The Last American Virgin	A Golan-Globus Production	Cannon Group Inc.	
December 9, 1982	That Championship Season	A Golan-Globus Production	Cannon Group Inc.	
1983	Private Manoeuvres (Sababa)	A Golan-Globus Production	Cannon Group Inc.	
1983	The Seven Magnificent Gladiators	A Golan-Globus Production	Cannon Group Inc.	
January 21, 1983	Treasure of the Four Crowns	A Lupo-Anthony-Quintano Production	Cannon Group Inc.	
February 1983	One More Chance	A Golan-Globus Production	Cannon Group Inc.	
March 11, 1983	10 to Midnight	A Golan-Globus Production for City Films Ltd.	Cannon Group Inc.	
April 1983	Nana	A Golan-Globus Production	Cannon Group Inc.	
June 17, 1983	House of the Long Shadows	A Golan-Globus Production	Cannon Group Inc.	
August 26, 1983	Hercules	A Golan-Globus Production	Cannon Group Inc., distributed by Metro-Goldwyn-Mayer	
August 26, 1983	Young Warriors	A Star Cinema Production	Cannon Group Inc.	
September 16, 1983	Revenge of the Ninja	A Golan-Globus Production	Cannon Group Inc., distributed by Metro-Goldwyn-Mayer	
October 28, 1983	The Wicked Lady	A Golan-Globus Production	Cannon Group Inc., distributed by Metro-Goldwyn-Mayer	
1984	Baby Love (Roman Za'ir)	A Golan-Globus Production	Cannon Group Inc.	
1984	The Big Tease: Here Comes Another One (Ha-Meticha Ha'Gdola)	A Yehuda Barkan/Ezra Shem-Tov Production	Cannon Group Inc.	
March 2, 1984	Over the Brooklyn Bridge	A Golan-Globus Production	Cannon Group Inc., distributed by Metro-Goldwyn-Mayer	
March 2, 1984	Sahara	A Golan-Globus Production	Cannon Group Inc., distributed by Metro-Goldwyn-Mayer	
May 4, 1984	Breakin'	A Golan-Globus Production	Cannon Group Inc., distributed by Metro-Goldwyn-Mayer	
May 18, 1984	Making the Grade	A Golan-Globus Production	Cannon Group Inc., distributed by Metro-Goldwyn-Mayer	
June 1984	Soldier of the Night (Hayal Halayla)	A Golan-Globus Production	Cannon Group Inc.	
June 13, 1984	The Naked Face	A Golan-Globus Production	Cannon Group Inc.	
June 22, 1984	Ordeal by Innocence	A Golan-Globus Production	Cannon Group Inc.	
July 1984	I'm Almost Not Crazy: John Cassavetes, the Man and His Work	A Golan-Globus Production	Cannon Group Inc.	
August 17, 1984	Sword of the Valiant	A Golan-Globus Production	Cannon Group Inc.	
August 24, 1984	Love Streams	A Golan-Globus Production	Cannon Group Inc.	
August 31, 1984	Bolero	A Golan-Globus Production for City Films Ltd.	Cannon Group Inc.	
September 14, 1984	Exterminator 2	A Golan-Globus Production	Cannon Group Inc.	
September 14, 1984	Ninja III: The Domination	A Golan-Globus Production	Cannon Group Inc.	
October 1984	Forced Witness (Edut Me'ones)	A Golan-Globus Production	Cannon Group Inc.	
November 16, 1984	Missing in Action	A Golan-Globus Production	Cannon Group Inc.	
December 19, 1984	Breakin' 2: Electric Boogaloo	A Golan-Globus Production	Cannon Group Inc., distributed by TriStar Pictures	
1985	The Lover (Ha-Me'ahev)	A Golan-Globus Production	Cannon Group Inc.	
1985	Up Your Anchor (Harimu Ogen)	A Golan-Globus Production	Cannon Group Inc.	
January 1985	Maria's Lovers	A Golan-Globus Production	Cannon Group Inc.	
January 1985	Hot Resort	A Golan-Globus Production	Cannon Group Inc.	
January 11, 1985	The Ambassador	A Golan-Globus Production	Cannon Group Inc.	
March 1, 1985	Missing in Action 2: The Beginning	A Golan-Globus Production	Cannon Group Inc.	
May 1985	Déjà Vu	A Golan-Globus Production	Cannon Group Inc.	
May 3, 1985	The Assisi Underground	A Golan-Globus Production	Cannon Group Inc.	
May 11, 1985	Rappin'	A Golan-Globus Production	Cannon Group Inc.	
May 17, 1985	Grace Quigley	A Golan-Globus Production	Cannon Group Inc.	
June 1, 1985	Hot Chili	A Golan-Globus Production	Cannon Group Inc.	
June 21, 1985	Lifeforce	A Golan-Globus Production	Cannon Group Inc., distributed by Tristar Pictures	
August 1, 1985	Thunder Alley	A Golan-Globus Production	Cannon Group Inc.	
August 14, 1986	Salomè	A Cannon / Italian International Film / Dédalus Co-Production	Cannon Group Inc.	
August 30, 1985	American Ninja	A Golan-Globus Production	Cannon Group Inc.	
September 1985	Mata Hari	A Golan-Globus Production	Cannon Group Inc.	
September 1985	Hard Rock Zombies	A Patel/Shah Film Company Production	Cannon Group Inc.	
September 13, 1985	War and Love	A Jack P. Eisner Production	Cannon Group Inc.	
September 27, 1985	Invasion U.S.A.	A Golan-Globus Production	Cannon Group Inc.	
October 4, 1985	The Adventures of Hercules	An Alfred Pecoriello Production	Cannon Italia	
October 4, 1985	The Berlin Affair	A Golan-Globus Production	Cannon Group Inc.	
November 1, 1985	Death Wish 3	A Golan-Globus Production	Cannon Group Inc.	
November 22, 1985	King Solomon's Mines	A Golan-Globus Production	Cannon Group Inc.	
December 1986	Aladdin	A Golan-Globus Production	Cannon Group Inc.	
December 6, 1985	Fool for Love	A Golan-Globus Production	Cannon Group Inc.	
December 6, 1985	Runaway Train	A Golan-Globus Production	Cannon Group Inc.	
January 24, 1986	Camorra (A Story of Streets, Women and Crime)	A Golan-Globus Production	Cannon Group Inc.	
February 14, 1986	The Delta Force	A Golan-Globus Production	Cannon Group Inc.	
March 7, 1986	The Naked Cage	A Golan-Globus Production	Cannon Group Inc.	
March 11, 1986	Field of Honor	An Organda Films Production	Cannon Group Inc.	
April 1986	America 3000	A Golan-Globus Production	Cannon Group Inc.	
April 4, 1986	P.O.W. the Escape	A Golan-Globus Production	Cannon Group Inc.	
April 18, 1986	Murphy's Law	A Golan-Globus Production	Cannon Group Inc.	
May 9, 1986	Dangerously Close	A Golan-Globus Production	Cannon Group Inc.	
May 23, 1986	Cobra	A Golan-Globus Production (hollow credit) (Note: The film was produced by Warner Bros. not Cannon. They agreed to give Cannon Inc./Golan-Globus a hollow producer’s credit in order to bypass the “exclusive” stipulation in Sylvester Stalone’s Cannon "Over the Top" contract. See: "The Cannon Film Guide Volume II 1985–1987".)	Warner Bros.	
June 6, 1986	Invaders from Mars	A Golan-Globus Production	Cannon Group Inc.	
August 1986	Lightning, the White Stallion	A Harry Alan Towers Production	Cannon International	
August 8, 1986	Detective School Dropouts	A Golan-Globus Production	Cannon Group Inc.	
August 22, 1986	The Texas Chainsaw Massacre 2	A Golan-Globus Production	Cannon Group Inc.	
September 12, 1986	Otello	A Golan-Globus Production	Cannon Group Inc.	
September 12, 1986	Avenging Force	A Golan-Globus Production	Cannon Group Inc.	
November 7, 1986	52 Pick-Up	A Golan-Globus Production	Cannon Group Inc.	
November 13, 1986	Castaway	A Rick McCallum Production	Cannon Screen Entertainment	
November 21, 1986	Firewalker	A Golan-Globus Production	Cannon Group Inc.	
December 25, 1986	Duet for One	A Golan-Globus Production	Cannon Group Inc.	
1987	Young Love (Ahava Tzeira)	A K.F. Kinofilm Production	Cannon Group Inc.	
1987	Million Dollar Madness (Ha-Shiga'on Hagadol)	A Golan-Globus Production	Cannon Group Inc.	
January 1987	Dutch Treat	A Golan-Globus Production	Cannon Group Inc.	
January 9, 1987	Assassination	A Golan-Globus Production	Cannon Group Inc.	
January 30, 1987	Allan Quatermain and the Lost City of Gold	A Golan-Globus Production	Cannon Group Inc.	
February 6, 1987	The Assault	A Fons Rademakers Production	Cannon Group Inc.	
February 13, 1987	Over the Top	A Golan-Globus Production	Warner Bros.	
February 27, 1987	Number One with a Bullet	A Golan-Globus Production	Cannon Group Inc.	
March 1987	The Barbarians	A John Thompson Production	Cannon International	
March 1987	Down Twisted	A Golan-Globus Production	Cannon Group Inc.	
March 20, 1987	Street Smart	A Golan-Globus Production	Cannon Group Inc.	
March 27, 1987	The Hanoi Hilton	A Golan-Globus Production	Cannon Group Inc.	
April 1987	Beauty and the Beast	A Golan-Globus Production	Cannon Group Inc.	
April 1987	Rumpelstiltskin	A Golan-Globus Production	Cannon Group Inc.	
May 1, 1987	American Ninja 2: The Confrontation	A Golan-Globus Production	Cannon Group Inc.	
May 12, 1987	Diary of a Mad Old Man	An Iblis Films, Dedalus Films, and Fons Rademakers Co-Production	Cannon Group Inc.	
May 13, 1987	Master of Dragonard Hill	A Breton Film Productions Ltd. Production	Cannon International	
May 15, 1987	The Emperor's New Clothes	A Golan-Globus Production	Cannon Group Inc.	
June 1987	Too Much	A Golan-Globus Production	Cannon Group Inc.	
June 1987	Three Kinds of Heat	A Michael J. Kagan Production	Cannon International	
June 12, 1987	Sleeping Beauty	A Golan-Globus Production	Cannon Group Inc.	
July 24, 1987	Superman IV: The Quest for Peace	A Golan-Globus Production	Warner Bros.	
August 7, 1987	Masters of the Universe	A Golan-Globus Production	Cannon Group Inc.	
September 4, 1987	Penitentiary III	A Jamaa-Leon Production	Cannon International	
September 15, 1987	King Lear	A Golan-Globus Production	Cannon Group Inc.	
September 18, 1987	Tough Guys Don't Dance	A Golan-Globus Production	Cannon Group Inc.	
September 19, 1987	The Kitchen Toto	A Skreba Film Production	Cannon Group Inc.	
October 9, 1987	Dancers	A Golan-Globus Production	Cannon Group Inc.	
October 9, 1987	Surrender	A Golan-Globus Production in association with Aaron Spelling and Alan Greisman	Cannon Group Inc.	
October 16, 1987	Barfly	A Golan-Globus Production	Cannon Group Inc. / Francis Ford Coppola	
October 21, 1987	Business as Usual	A Golan-Globus Production	Cannon Group Inc.	
November 6, 1987	Death Wish 4: The Crackdown	A Golan-Globus Production	Cannon Group Inc.	
December 4, 1987	Under Cover	A Golan-Globus Production	Cannon Group Inc.	
1988	Summertime Blues (Blues Ba-Kayitz)	A K.F. Kinofilm Production	Cannon Group Inc.	
1988	Stray Days (I giorni randagi)	A Golan-Globus Production	Cannon/VMP (West Germany)	
1988	The Arrogant	A Cannon Films Production	Cannon International	
January 22, 1988	Braddock: Missing in Action III	A Golan-Globus Production	Cannon Group Inc.	
February 1988	Gor	A Harry Alan Towers / Avi Lerner Production	Cannon International	
February 1988	Mercenary Fighters	A Golan-Globus Production	Cannon Group Inc.	
February 12, 1988	Going Bananas	A Golan-Globus Production	Cannon Group Inc.	
February 17, 1988	Bernadette	A Jacques Quintard-Giancarlo Parretti Production	Cannon Group Inc.	
February 26, 1988	Alien from L.A.	A Golan-Globus Production	Cannon Group Inc.	
February 26, 1988	Bloodsport	A Mark DiSalle Production	Cannon International	
April 15, 1988	Appointment with Death	A Golan-Globus Production	Cannon Group Inc.	
April 29, 1988	Powaqqatsi: Life in Transformation	A Golan-Globus Production	Cannon Group Inc. / Francis Ford Coppola and George Lucas	
May 1988	Shy People	A Golan-Globus Production	Cannon Group Inc.	
May 7, 1988	Salsa	A Golan-Globus Production	Cannon Group Inc.	
June 1, 1988	The Frog Prince	A Golan-Globus Production	Cannon Group Inc.	
June 1988	Puss in Boots	A Golan-Globus Production	Cannon Group Inc.	
July 30, 1988	Journey to the Center of the Earth	A Golan-Globus Production	Cannon Group Inc.	
August 26, 1988	Hero and the Terror	A Golan-Globus Production	Cannon Group Inc.	
September 15, 1988	D.C. Follies [TV series - Season 2]	A Sid & Marty Krofft Production in association with Cannon Films	Broadcast syndication [TV], Cannon Video [3 "Best of" VHS releases]	
September 16, 1988	Messenger of Death	A Golan-Globus Production	Cannon Group Inc.	
September 16, 1988	Doin' Time on Planet Earth	A Golan-Globus Production	Cannon Group Inc.	
October 1988	Platoon Leader	A Breton Film Productions Ltd. Production	Cannon International	
November 11, 1988	Evil Angels	A Golan-Globus Production in association with Cinema Verity Limited	Warner Bros.	
November 23, 1988	Hanna's War	A Golan-Globus Production	Cannon Group Inc.	
December 10, 1988	Hansel and Gretel	A Golan-Globus Production	Cannon Group Inc.	
December 16, 1988	Haunted Summer	A Golan-Globus Production	Cannon Group Inc.	
1989	Snow White	A Golan-Globus Production	Cannon Group Inc.	
January 27, 1989	Manifesto	A Golan-Globus Production	Cannon Group Inc.	
February 3, 1989	Kinjite: Forbidden Subjects	A Golan-Globus Production	Cannon Entertainment	
February 24, 1989	American Ninja 3: Blood Hunt	A Breton Film Productions Ltd. Production	Cannon International	
March 15, 1989	Red Riding Hood	A Golan-Globus Production	Cannon Group Inc.	
March 21, 1989	Outlaw of Gor	A Breton Film Productions Ltd. Production	Cannon International	
April 1, 1989	Sinbad of the Seven Seas	An Enzo G. Castellari Production	Cannon International	
April 7, 1989	Cyborg	A Golan-Globus Production	Cannon Entertainment	

=== Theatrical releases ===
The following are films not produced by Cannon but which were theatrically distributed by them.
Release Date	Title	Distribution	Presented by	Country	Ref
March 14, 1980	Last Rites	Cannon Releasing Corporation	Cannon Group Inc.	United States	
May 29, 1981	Alien Contamination	Cannon Releasing Corporation	Cannon Group Inc.	United States	
1982	Othello (The Black Commando)	Cannon Film Distributors	Cannon International	United States	
1982	Beyond Evil	Cannon Releasing Corporation	Cannon Group Inc.	United States	
1982	Graduation Day	Cannon Releasing Corporation	Cannon Group Inc.	United States	
1982	Northeast of Seoul	Cannon Releasing Corporation	Cannon Group Inc.	United States	
1982	To Be A Rose	Cannon Releasing Corporation	Cannon Group Inc.	United States	
1982	The Treasure Seekers	Cannon Releasing Corporation	Cannon Group Inc./ Halart Productions	United States	
1982	Raggedy Man	Cannon Film Distributors (UK) Ltd.		United Kingdom	
1983	Funny Money	Cannon Film Distributors (UK) Ltd.	Cannon Group Inc.	United Kingdom	
1983	The Sword of the Barbarians	Cannon Releasing Corporation	Cannon Group Inc.	United States	
1983	Don't Go Near the Park	Cannon Releasing Corporation	Cannon Group Inc.	United States	
1984	The Ballad of Narayama (楢山節考)	Cannon Film Distributors (UK) Ltd.		United Kingdom	
1984	Thor the Conqueror	Cannon Releasing Corporation	Cannon Group Inc.	United States	
1984	Fast Lane Fever	Cannon Releasing Corporation	Cannon Group Inc.	United States	
February 22, 1984	Emmanuelle 4	Cannon Releasing Corporation	Cannon Group Inc.	United States	
1984	Malombra	Cannon Distributors (UK) Ltd.		United Kingdom	
1985	Rendez-vous	Cannon Film Distributors (UK) Ltd.		United Kingdom	
1985	The Quiet Earth	Cannon Film Distributors (UK) Ltd.		United Kingdom	
1985	Story of O Part II (Histoire d'O: Chapitre 2)	Cannon Releasing Corporation		United States	
1985	Xavana: The Island of Love	Cannon Releasing Corporation	Cannon Group Inc.	United Kingdom	
1985	The Sicilian Connection	Cannon Releasing Corporation	Cannon International	United States	
March 14, 1985	Stronghold (Wildschut)	Cannon Tuschinski Film Distribution	Cannon International	Netherlands	
April 19, 1985	The Company of Wolves	Cannon Releasing Corporation	Cannon Group Inc.	United States	
August 1985	Jungle Raiders	Cannon Releasing Corporation	Cannon Group Inc.	United States	
September 3, 1985	The Dream	Cannon Tuschinski Film Distribution		Netherlands	
September 12, 1985	When Father Was Away on Business	Cannon Releasing Corporation	Cannon Group Inc.	United States	
September 12, 1985	Flesh+Blood	Cannon Tuschinski Film Distribution		Netherlands	
1986	Thérèse	Cannon Releasing Corporation		World-wide	
1986	Dirty War (Guerra sucia)	Cannon Releasing Corporation	Cannon International	United States	
1986	The Manhattan Project	Columbia-Cannon-Warner	Gladden Entertainment	United Kingdom	
January 9, 1986	Basic Training	Cannon Tuschinski Film Distribution		Netherlands	
March 5, 1986	Link	Cannon Screen Entertainment	A Richard Franklin Production	United Kingdom	
March 7, 1986	Highlander	Columbia-Cannon-Warner	Cannon Group Inc.	United Kingdom	
May 8, 1986	Pirates	Cannon Group Inc.	A Tarak Ben Ammar Production	France, Tunisia, Poland	
May 30, 1986	Thunder Run	Cannon Releasing Corporation	Lynn-Davis Productions / Panache Productions	United States	
June 25, 1986	The Hitcher	Cannon France	Cannon Group, Inc. & HBO Pictures in association with Silver Screen Partners	France	
July 17, 1986	Never Too Young to Die	Scotia/Cannon	Paul Entertainment	West Germany	
July 25, 1986	Robotech: The Movie	Cannon Releasing Corporation	Cannon Group Inc.	United States	
September 25, 1986	De kKKomediant	Cannon Tuschinski Film Distribution	Cannon Group Inc.	Netherlands	
November 19, 1986	La dernière image	Cannon France	Ema Films / TF1 Films Production / S.I.A.	France	
1987	Repentance (Покаяние)	Cannon Releasing Corporation	Cannon Group Inc.	United States	
1987	Jean de Florette	Cannon Film Distributors (UK) Ltd.		United Kingdom	
1987	Manon des Sources: Jean de Florette Part II	Cannon Film Distributors (UK) Ltd.		United Kingdom	
1987	Masques	Cannon Film Distributors (UK) Ltd.	Marin Karmitz	United Kingdom	
January 29, 1987	Clockwise	Cannon Tuschinski Film Distribution	Cannon Screen Entertainment	Netherlands	
February 12, 1987	Black and White in Color	Scotia/Cannon		West Germany	
February 13, 1987	Mannequin	Columbia-Cannon-Warner	Gladden Entertainment in association with Cannon Screen Entertainment	World-wide	
February 18, 1987	Le Miraculé	Cannon France	Initial Groupe	France	
February 25, 1987	The Hills Have Eyes Part II	Cannon France	Cannon Group Inc. in association with Adrienne Fancey, VTC and New Realm Entertainment	France	
March 19, 1987	The Detached Mission	Scotia/Cannon		West Germany	
May 7, 1987	Mascara	Cannon Tuschinski Film Distribution	Cannon International	Netherlands	
June 19, 1987	White of the Eye	Cannon Film Distributors (UK) Ltd.	Elliot Kastner in association with Cannon Screen Entertainment	United Kingdom	
June 24, 1987	A Thorn in the Heart (Una spina nel cuore)	Cannon France	André Djaoui	France	
July 2, 1987	The Misfit Brigade	Scotia-Cannon		West Germany	
August 12, 1987	La petite allumeuse	Cannon France	Sylvette Frydman & Roger André Larrieu	France	
September 24, 1987	Looking for Eileen (Zoeken naar Eileen)	Cannon Tuschinski Film Distribution		Netherlands	
October 1987	Heat	Columbia-Cannon-Warner	Elliot Kastner in association with Cannon Screen Entertainment	United Kingdom	
November 9, 1987	Count Your Blessings (Van geluk gesproken)	Cannon Tuschinski Film Distribution	Rob Houver's Film Company	Netherlands	
April 1, 1988	Storm	Cannon Releasing Corporation	Cannon International	World-wide	
April 20, 1988	Rituals (Rituelen)	Cannon Tuschinski Film Distribution	Matthijs Van Heijningen	Netherlands	
June 16, 1988	Amsterdamned	Scotia-Cannon		West Germany	
June 30, 1988	Honeybun (Honneponnetje)	Cannon Tuschinski Film Distribution	Cannon Group Inc.	Netherlands	
September 22, 1988	Top Line	Scotia-Cannon		West Germany	
October 20, 1988	Bear Ye One Another's Burden (Einer trage des anderen Last)	Scotia/Cannon		Germany	
October 21, 1988	Little Dorrit	Cannon Screen Entertainment	John Brabourne and Richard Goodwin in association with Cannon Screen Entertainment	United States	
November 9, 1988	Patty Hearst	Cannon France	Atlantic Entertainment Group/Zenith	France	
December 15, 1988	Brain Damage	Scotia/Cannon	Palisades Partners	Germany	
December 22, 1988	Big	Cannon Film Distributors		Netherlands	
January 5, 1989	Red Scorpion	Scotia/Cannon	Shapiro Glickenhaus Entertainment	West Germany	
February 2, 1989	License to Drive	Cannon Film Distributors		Netherlands	
February 25, 1989	Cop	Cannon France	Cannon France	France	

=== Home Video releases ===
The following are other films not produced by Cannon but which were distributed by them on at least one of their numerous home video labels.
Release Date	Title	Label	Catalog #	Country	Ref
1984	Blind Rage	Cannon / MGM/UA Home Video	MV600428	United States	
1985	The Great Skycopter Rescue	Cannon / MGM/UA Home Video	MV600491	United States	
1985	The Devil's Triangle [Documentary]	Cannon / MGM/UA Home Video	MV600598	United States	
1985	Hell Squad	Cannon / MGM/UA Home Video	MV600620	United States	
1985	The Final Executioner	Cannon / MGM/UA Home Video	MV600657	United States	
June 5, 1986	The Throne of Fire	Cannon / MGM/UA Home Video	MV600680	United States	
1985	The Violent Breed	Cannon / MGM/UA Home Video	MV600684	United States	
1986	No. 1 of the Secret Service	Cannon / MGM/UA Home Video	MV800788	United States	
1986	Hanging on a Star	Cannon / MGM/UA Home Video	MV800789	United States	
October 3, 1986	Hollywood Harry	Cannon / Media Home Video	M907	United States	
1985	Priest of Love	HBO/Cannon Video		United States	
1985	The Dog Who Stopped the War	HBO/Cannon Video		United States	
1985	Monty Python Live at the Hollywood Bowl	HBO/Cannon Video	TVB 1489	United States	
1985	Xtro	HBO/Cannon Video	TVB 1632	United States	
1985	Martin	HBO/Cannon Video	TVB 1976	United States	
1985	Dawn of the Dead	HBO/Cannon Video	TVB 1977	United States	
1985	The Evil Dead	HBO/Cannon Video	TVB 1979	United States	
1985	Finnegan Begin Again	HBO/Cannon Video	TVC 3243	United States	
1985	Beach Blanket Bingo	HBO/Cannon Video	TVC 3349	United States	
1985	The Babysitter	HBO/Cannon Video	TVC 3388	United States	
1985	The Pee-wee Herman Show	HBO/Cannon Video	TVF 3433	United States	
1986	Miracles	HBO/Cannon Video	TVA 2982	United States	
1986	Volunteers	HBO/Cannon Video	TVA 2983	United States	
1986	Back To School	HBO/Cannon Video	TVA 2988	United States	
1986	Desperately Seeking Susan	HBO/Cannon Video	TVA 2991	United States	
1986	Rambo: First Blood Part II	HBO/Cannon Video	TVA 3002	United States	
1986	Howling II: Your Sister Is a Werewolf	HBO/Cannon Video	TVA 3004	United States	
1986	Twist and Shout (Tro, håb og kærlighed)	HBO/Cannon Video	TVA 3673	United States	
April 18, 1986	Absolute Beginners: The Musical	HBO/Cannon Video	TVA 3900	United States	
1986	Osa	HBO/Cannon Video	TVA 3905	United States	
1986	Haunted Honeymoon	HBO/Cannon Video	TVA 3911	United States	
1986	Just Between Friends	HBO/Cannon Video	TVA 3919	United States	
1986	Cry of the Banshee	HBO/Cannon Video	TVA 9950	United States	
1986	Opposing Force	HBO/Cannon Video	TVA 9952	United States	
1986	Let's Get Harry	HBO/Cannon Video	TVA 9953	United States	
1986	Touch and Go	HBO/Cannon Video	TVA 9956	United States	
1986	Gorp	HBO/Cannon Video	TVA 9957	United States	
1986	Hennessy	HBO/Cannon Video	TVA 9958	United States	
1986	Night of the Creeps	HBO/Cannon Video	TVA 9959	United States	
1986	The Tales of Beatrix Potter	HBO/Cannon Video	TVF 3902	United States	
1986	A Week with Raquel	HBO/Cannon Video	TVF 9965	United States	
1986	Alakazam the Great (西遊記)	HBO/Cannon Video	TVF 9976	United States	
1986	Mona Lisa	HBO/Cannon Video	TVR 9955	United States	
1986	Death on the Nile	HBO/Cannon Video	PTVF 1035	United States	
1986	One Flew Over the Cuckoo's Nest	HBO/Cannon Video	PTVF 1048	United States	
1986	The Lord of the Rings	HBO/Cannon Video	PTVF 1049	United States	
1986	The Mirror Crack'd	HBO/Cannon Video	PTVF 1054	United States	
1986	Evil Under the Sun	HBO/Cannon Video	PTVF 1080	United States	
1986	Endless Night	HBO/Cannon Video	PTVF 1424	United States	
1986	All of Me	HBO/Cannon Video	PTVF 2715	United States	
1986	Code of Silence	HBO/Cannon Video	PTVF 2985	United States	
1986	Amadeus	HBO/Cannon Video	PTVF 2997	United States	
1987	Really Weird Tales	HBO/Cannon Video		United States	
1987	Something Wild	HBO/Cannon Video	0001	United States	
1987	Act of Vengeance	HBO/Cannon Video	0002	United States	
1987	Flatbed Annie & Sweetie Pie: Lady Truckers	HBO/Cannon Video	0005	United States	
1987	The Return of Bruno	HBO/Cannon Video	0006	United States	
1987	Hannah and Her Sisters	HBO/Cannon Video	3897	United States	
1987	Break Every Rule	HBO/Cannon Video	9940	United States	
1987	Muscle Beach Party	HBO/Cannon Video	9945	United States	
1987	Sword of Gideon	HBO/Cannon Video	9947	United States	
1987	Wild in the Streets	HBO/Cannon Video	TVA 9967	United States	
1987	Yuri Nosenko, KGB	HBO/Cannon Video	TVA 9968	United States	
1987	Seize the Day [TV]	HBO/Cannon Video	TVA 9970	United States	
1987	Die, Monster, Die!	HBO/Cannon Video	TVA 9972	United States	
1987	Half A Lifetime	HBO/Cannon Video	TVA 9973	United States	
1987	The Longshot	HBO/Cannon Video	TVA 9974	United States	
1987	Apology	HBO/Cannon Video	TVA 9975	United States	
1987	As Summers Die	HBO/Cannon Video	TVA 9977	United States	
1987	Raw Deal	HBO/Cannon Video	TVA 9982	United States	
1987	Blast Off (Jules Verne's Rocket to the Moon)	HBO/Cannon Video	TVA 9983	United States	
1987	Nothing in Common	HBO/Cannon Video	TVR 9960	United States	
1988	5 Corners	Cannon Video	31010	United States	
1988	Gotham [TV]	Cannon Video	31011	United States	
September 10, 1988	The Raggedy Rawney	Cannon Video	31039	United States	
z
1984	A Little Sex	Cannon / Guild Home Video	888 8306 7	United Kingdom	
1984	The Four Deuces	Cannon / Rank Video	0152 C	United Kingdom	
1984	The Desperate Ones	Cannon / Rank Video	0187 Y	United Kingdom	
1984	The Last Oasis (Poslednja oaza)	Cannon / Rank Video	0280	United Kingdom	
1986	Escalier C	Cannon / Rank Video	0273	United Kingdom	
1987	Harem	Cannon / Rank Video	0251	United Kingdom	
1987	Colonel Redl (Oberst Redl)	Cannon / Rank Video	0265	United Kingdom	
1988	L'addition	Cannon / Rank Video	0269	United Kingdom	
1986	The Third Man	Cannon Screen Entertainment Limited / Cannon Classics	90 0008 2	United Kingdom	
1986	The Deer Hunter	Cannon Screen Entertainment Limited / Cannon Classics	90 0230 2	United Kingdom	
1986	It Shouldn't Happen to a Vet	Cannon Screen Entertainment Limited / Cannon Classics	90 0234 2	United Kingdom	
1986	Metropolis	Cannon Screen Entertainment Limited / Cannon Classics	90 0823 2	United Kingdom	
1986	Broken Mirrors	Cannon Screen Entertainment Limited	90 3393 2	United Kingdom	
1986	Black Moon Rising	Cannon Screen Entertainment Limited	90 3625 2	United Kingdom	
1986	Legend	Cannon Screen Entertainment Limited	90 3651 2	United Kingdom	
1986	Marie	Cannon Screen Entertainment Limited	90 3733 2	United Kingdom	
1986	Sweet Dreams	Cannon Screen Entertainment Limited	90 3734 2	United Kingdom	
1986	Private Sessions	Cannon Screen Entertainment Limited	90 3780 2	United Kingdom	
1986	Deadringer	Cannon Screen Entertainment Limited	90 3896 2	United Kingdom	
1986	Praying Mantis	Cannon Screen Entertainment Limited	90 3954 2	United Kingdom	
1986	Dreamchild	Cannon Screen Entertainment Limited	90 3955 2	United Kingdom	
1986	Year of the Dragon	Cannon Screen Entertainment Limited	90 3957 2	United Kingdom	
1986	Santa Claus: The Movie	Cannon Screen Entertainment Limited	90 3958 2	United Kingdom	
1986	Silver Bullet	Cannon Screen Entertainment Limited	90 4000 2	United Kingdom	
1986	The Little Green Man	Cannon Screen Entertainment Limited	90 4004 2	United Kingdom	
1986	The King of Friday Night	Cannon Screen Entertainment Limited	90 4005 2	United Kingdom	
1986	Choices	Cannon Screen Entertainment Limited	90 4009 2	United Kingdom	
1986	Force of Darkness	Cannon Screen Entertainment Limited	90 4010 4	United Kingdom	
1986	A Case of Deadly Force	Cannon Screen Entertainment Limited	90 4012 2	United Kingdom	
1986	The Great Bookie Robbery Part 1	Cannon Screen Entertainment Limited	90 4014 2	United Kingdom	
1986	The Great Bookie Robbery Part 2	Cannon Screen Entertainment Limited	90 4015 2	United Kingdom	
1986	The Great Bookie Robbery Part 3	Cannon Screen Entertainment Limited	90 4016 2	United Kingdom	
1987	Crossover	Cannon Screen Entertainment Limited	90 4018 2	United Kingdom	
1987	The Adventures of Buckaroo Banzai Across the 8th Dimension	Cannon Screen Entertainment Limited	90 4022 2	United Kingdom	
1987	Head Office	Cannon Screen Entertainment Limited	90 4027 4	United Kingdom	
1987	Placido: A Year in the Life of Placido Domingo	Cannon Screen Entertainment Limited	90 4029 2	United Kingdom	
1987	French Quarter Undercover	Cannon Screen Entertainment Limited	90 4037 2	United Kingdom	
1987	Blood Sisters	Cannon Screen Entertainment Limited	90 4038 2	United Kingdom	
1987	Fire in the Night	Cannon Screen Entertainment Limited	90 4039 2	United Kingdom	
1987	The War Boy	Cannon Screen Entertainment Limited	90 4043 3	United Kingdom	
1987	Ninja Hunt	Cannon Screen Entertainment Limited	90 4044 2	United Kingdom	
1987	Mesmerized	Cannon Screen Entertainment Limited	90 4046 2	United Kingdom	
1987	Victims of Passion	Cannon Screen Entertainment Limited	90 4047 4	United Kingdom	
1987	Resting Place	Cannon Screen Entertainment Limited	90 4048 2	United Kingdom	
1987	Concrete Hell	Cannon Screen Entertainment Limited	90 4056 2	United Kingdom	
1987	Anastasia Part One	Cannon Screen Entertainment Limited	90 4059 2	United Kingdom	
1987	Anastasia Part Two	Cannon Screen Entertainment Limited	90 4060 4	United Kingdom	
1987	The City's Edge	Cannon / MGM/UA Home Video [UK]	UMV 10655	United Kingdom	
1987	Wisdom	Cannon / Warner Home Video [UK]	PEV 37209	United Kingdom	
1988	Raiders in Action	Cannon / Warner Home Video [UK]	PEV 37176	United Kingdom	
1991	Red Sonja	Cannon / Warner Home Video [UK]	PES 52038	United Kingdom	
1991	The Dead Zone	Cannon / Warner Home Video [UK]	PES 54260	United Kingdom	
1988	Withnail and I	Cannon Video [UK]	50041	United Kingdom	
1988	Bellman and True	Cannon Video [UK]	50181	United Kingdom	
1988	Track 29	Cannon Video [UK]	50231	United Kingdom	
z
1984	They Shoot Horses, Don't They?	Cannon/VMP	0810	Germany	
1984	Kotch	Cannon/VMP	0815	Germany	
1984	The Ghoul	Cannon/VMP	2234	Germany	
1984	Killers on Wheels (無法無天飛車黨)	Cannon/VMP	6079	Germany	
1984	The Boxer from Shantung (馬永貞)	Cannon/VMP	6082	Germany	
1985	Arabian Adventure	Cannon/VMP		Germany	
1985	The Cop (Un condé)	Cannon/VMP	7229	Germany	
1985	Knives of the Avenger (I coltelli del vendicatore)	Cannon/VMP	7267	Germany	
1986	Plenty	Cannon/VMP	0052	Germany	
1987	Scrubbers	Cannon/VMP	2240	Germany	
1987	The Brain Machine	Cannon/VMP	5302	Germany	
1987	3:15	Cannon/VMP	6331	Germany	
1987	Keeping Track	Cannon/VMP	6332	Germany	
1987	Mexican Slayride (Coplan ouvre le feu à Mexico)	Cannon/VMP	7230	Germany	
1987	Agent Secret FX 18	Cannon/VMP	7231	Germany	
1988	Black Tunnel	Cannon/VMP		Germany	
1988	Restless Natives	Cannon/VMP	0116	Germany	
1988	Dressed to Kill	Cannon/VMP	0995	Germany	
1988	Comfort and Joy	Cannon/VMP	3616	Germany	
1988	The Darkside	Cannon/VMP	6354	Germany	
1988	The Freakmaker	Cannon/VMP	6397	Germany	
1988	The Outlaw Inferno (Ulo ng gapo)	Cannon/VMP	6404	Germany	
1988	The Big Family (L'onorata famiglia - Uccidere è cosa nostra)	Cannon/VMP	7269	Germany	
1985	The Atlantis Interceptors	Cannon Screen Entertainment [Germany]		Germany	
1985	The Amityville Horror	Cannon Screen Entertainment [Germany]		Germany	
1985	The Driver	Cannon Screen Entertainment [Germany]	0448	Germany	
1985	Convoy	Cannon Screen Entertainment [Germany]	0452	Germany	
1985	Too Late the Hero	Cannon Screen Entertainment [Germany]	0811	Germany	
1985	Fake-Out	Cannon Screen Entertainment [Germany]	1947	Germany	
1985	Anna's Mother	Cannon Screen Entertainment [Germany]	2236	Germany	
1985	Fighting Back	Cannon Screen Entertainment [Germany]	2529	Germany	
1985	Mad Mission 3: Our Man from Bond Street (最佳拍檔女皇密令)	Cannon Screen Entertainment [Germany]	2692	Germany	
1985	Thousand Eyes	Cannon Screen Entertainment [Germany]	2693	Germany	
1985	Electric Dreams	Cannon Screen Entertainment [Germany]	2893	Germany	
1985	Delitto in Formula Uno	Cannon Screen Entertainment [Germany]	2894	Germany	
1985	Blame It on Rio	Cannon Screen Entertainment [Germany]	3100	Germany	
1985	Final Mission	Cannon Screen Entertainment [Germany]	3180	Germany	
1985	Dreamscape	Cannon Screen Entertainment [Germany]	3521	Germany	
1986	What Waits Below	Cannon Screen Entertainment [Germany]		Germany	
1986	A Sense of Freedom	Cannon Screen Entertainment [Germany]	0031	Germany	
1986	Honky Tonk Freeway	Cannon Screen Entertainment [Germany]	0187	Germany	
1986	Raid on Entebbe	Cannon Screen Entertainment [Germany]	0188	Germany	
1986	Murphy's War	Cannon Screen Entertainment [Germany]	0458	Germany	
1986	Silver Bears	Cannon Screen Entertainment [Germany]	0469	Germany	
1986	Straw Dogs	Cannon Screen Entertainment [Germany]	0803	Germany	
1986	Puberty Blues	Cannon Screen Entertainment [Germany]	1625	Germany	
1986	Frances	Cannon Screen Entertainment [Germany]	2119	Germany	
1986	Mister Deathman	Cannon Screen Entertainment [Germany]	2179	Germany	
1986	Oliver Twist	Cannon Screen Entertainment [Germany]	2182	Germany	
1986	Amityville II: The Possession	Cannon Screen Entertainment [Germany]	2238	Germany	
1986	Children of the Corn	Cannon Screen Entertainment [Germany]	2690	Germany	
1986	Superman III	Cannon Screen Entertainment [Germany]	2691	Germany	
1986	Slayground	Cannon Screen Entertainment [Germany]	2866	Germany	
1986	Firestarter	Cannon Screen Entertainment [Germany]	2892	Germany	
1986	The Philadelphia Experiment	Cannon Screen Entertainment [Germany]	2896	Germany	
1986	The Hotel New Hampshire	Cannon Screen Entertainment [Germany]	90 3102	Germany	
1986	Strange Invaders	Cannon Screen Entertainment [Germany]	3228	Germany	
1986	The Shooting Party	Cannon Screen Entertainment [Germany]	3234	Germany	
1986	Water	Cannon Screen Entertainment [Germany]	3545	Germany	
1986	The Take	Cannon Screen Entertainment [Germany]	3608	Germany	
1986	The Holcroft Covenant	Cannon Screen Entertainment [Germany]	3749	Germany	
1986	Legend of the Werewolf	Cannon Screen Entertainment [Germany]	3751	Germany	
1986	Ginger and Fred	Cannon Screen Entertainment [Germany]	3752	Germany	
1987	Cat's Eye	Cannon Screen Entertainment [Germany]	0010	Germany	
1987	The Long Good Friday	Cannon Screen Entertainment [Germany]	0189	Germany	
1987	The Burning	Cannon Screen Entertainment [Germany]	1372	Germany	
1987	The Wild Angels	Cannon Screen Entertainment [Germany]	1374	Germany	
1987	S*P*Y*S	Cannon Screen Entertainment [Germany]	1455	Germany	
1987	The Stud	Cannon Screen Entertainment [Germany]	3147	Germany	
1987	The Bitch	Cannon Screen Entertainment [Germany]	3148	Germany	
1987	Morons from Outer Space	Cannon Screen Entertainment [Germany]	3542	Germany	
1987	Catholic Boys	Cannon Screen Entertainment [Germany]	3753	Germany	
1987	Terror	Scotia/Cannon	1E 367	Germany	
1987	Sunday in the Country	Scotia/Cannon	1E 371	Germany	
1987	The Beloved	Scotia/Cannon	1E 372	Germany	
1987	The Black Torment	Scotia/Cannon	1E 385	Germany	
1988	Prey	Scotia/Cannon	1E 387	Germany	
z
1986	The Funniest Man in the World	Cannon International	311003	Netherlands	
1986	Mad Dog	Cannon International	311009	Netherlands	
1986	Paradise Motel	Cannon Screen Entertainment [Netherlands]		Netherlands	
1986	The Tender Age (The Little Sister)	Cannon Screen Entertainment [Netherlands]		Netherlands	
1986	9 Deaths of the Ninja	Cannon Screen Entertainment [Netherlands]		Netherlands	
1986	Letter to Brezhnev	Cannon Screen Entertainment [Netherlands]		Netherlands	
1986	The Best of Times	Cannon Screen Entertainment [Netherlands]	58 0012 2	Netherlands	
1986	Violent City	Cannon Screen Entertainment [Netherlands]	58 0063 2	Netherlands	
1987	9½ Weeks	Cannon Screen Entertainment [Netherlands]		Netherlands	
1987	Teen Wolf Too	Cannon Screen Entertainment [Netherlands]		Netherlands	
1987	The Flamingo Kid	Cannon Screen Entertainment [Netherlands]		Netherlands	
1987	Ghost Fever	Cannon Screen Entertainment [Netherlands]		Netherlands	
1987	Forbidden	Cannon Screen Entertainment [Netherlands]	58 0014 2	Netherlands	
1987	Wet Gold	Cannon Screen Entertainment [Netherlands]	58 0015 2	Netherlands	
1987	The Light at the Edge of the World	Cannon Screen Entertainment [Netherlands]	58 0108 2	Netherlands	
1987	Bluebeard	Cannon Screen Entertainment [Netherlands]	58 0109 2	Netherlands	
1987	Biggles	Cannon Screen Entertainment [Netherlands]	58 0126 2	Netherlands	
1987	They're Playing with Fire	Cannon Screen Entertainment [Netherlands]	58 0135 2	Netherlands	
1987	Flodder	Cannon Screen Entertainment [Netherlands]	58 0143 2	Netherlands	
1988	Hellhole	Cannon Screen Entertainment [Netherlands]	58 0176 2	Netherlands	
1988	Wild Thing	Cannon Screen Entertainment [Netherlands]	58 0206 2	Netherlands	
1988	The Freeway Maniac	Cannon Screen Entertainment [Netherlands]	58 0227 2	Netherlands	
z
1987	The Transformers Volume 1	Cannon/ ECV		Belgium	
1987	The Transformers Volume 2	Cannon/ ECV	HV 003-2	Belgium	
1987	The Transformers Volume 3	Cannon/ ECV		Belgium	
z
1985	Mission Africa	Cannon / Showtime		Finland	
1985	Corleone	Cannon / Showtime		Finland	
1985	Mrs. vs Mistress (Irit, Irit)	Cannon / Showtime		Finland	
1985	Baby Cat	Cannon / Showtime		Finland	
1987	The Scorpion	Cannon / Showtime		Finland	
1986	Death Ride to Osaka	Cannon International		Finland	
1985	A Private Function	Cannon Screen Entertainment AB	90 3856	Finland	
1986	Flashpoint	Cannon Screen Entertainment AB / Showtime	90 3467	Finland	
1986	Mission Kill	Cannon Screen Entertainment AB	90 3480	Finland	
1986	The Glitter Dome	Cannon Screen Entertainment AB / Showtime		Finland	
1988	Killers	Cannon / United Film		Finland	
z
1983	Conan the Barbarian	Cannon Screen Entertainment AB / Mayco	483	Denmark	
1984	Helga, She Wolf of Stilberg	Cannon / A-B-Collection Videofilm	7129	Denmark	
1986	Demons of the Mind	Cannon / Mayco	422	Denmark	
z
1985	Treasure Island	Cannon		Norway	
z
1986	Children's War	Cannon / Isbond		Scandinavia	
z
1987	The Elephant Man	Cannon / Sandrews Video	90 1418 0	Sweden	
z
1983	Invasion: Camboya (Intrusion: Cambodia)	Cannon Transmundo Home Video S.A.	063	Argentina	
z
1983	Rescue Team	Cannon / Video Show Productions		Spain	
1985	Razorback	Cannon / CBS Fox Española, S.A.	3692-2	Spain	
1985	Psycho Girls	Cannon / Multivision Home Video	10080197	Spain	
1986	Christmas Evil	Cannon Entertainment / Cydis Video	06003	Spain	
z
1985	Devil Master	Cannon International / Tohokushinsha King Video	K28V-15034	Japan	
1985	Privates on Parade	Cannon International / Tohokushinsha King Video	K48V-15104	Japan	
z
1985	Rentadick	Cannon / Rank Video	ZRR 4086	Australia	
1985	The Quatermass Conclusion	Cannon / Thames Video	ZT 5091	Australia	
z
1986	Dogs of Hell	Cannon Vidéo	V 3535290	France	
z
1987	Thunder 2	Cannon / Macro Entertainment	ZW7137	New Zealand	

== Assonitis-Globus-Pearce Cannon ==
=== Cannon Productions ===
The following are films produced by Cannon from 1989 to 1994 under the leadership of Ovidio G. Assonitis and then later, Yoram Globus and Christopher Pearce, following the departure of Menahem Golan after the sale of Cannon Films to Giancarlo Parretti. Globus was not involved with Cannon from 1989 to 1992. After MGM-Pathé collapsed in 1992, Globus returned to produce films for Cannon.
Release Date	Title	Production	Distribution	Ref
1989	The Secret of the Ice Cave	A Galla Film Production in association with Globus-Pearce	Cannon Releasing	
September 29, 1989	River of Death	A Breton Film Productions Ltd. Production	Cannon International	
November 10, 1989	Ten Little Indians	A Breton Film Productions Ltd. Production	Cannon Entertainment	
December 22, 1989	The Rose Garden	A CCC Filmkunst Production in association with Globus-Pearce Productions	Cannon Releasing	
February 2, 1990	A Man Called Sarge	A Globus-Pearce Production	Cannon Releasing	
February 7, 1990	Angels	A CAB Productions / Marea Films / Cadrage / Cannon Group Iberoamerica Production	Sadfi Films (Switzerland), Les Films de l'Atalante (France)	
February 23, 1990	Rockula	A Cannon Pictures / Jefery Levy Production	Cannon Releasing	
March 9, 1990	Keaton's Cop	A Third Coast Production	Cannon Releasing	
March 16, 1990	Lambada	A Cannon Pictures Production in association with Film and Television Company	Warner Bros.	
March 23, 1990	The Fourth War	A Wolf Schmidt Production	Cannon Releasing	
July 20, 1990	Midnight Ride	An Ovidio G. Assonitis Production	Cannon Pictures	
August 24, 1990	Delta Force 2: The Colombian Connection	A Globus-Pearce Production	Metro-Goldwyn-Mayer	
March 8, 1991	American Ninja 4: The Annihilation	A Christopher Pearce Production	Cannon Pictures	
March 23, 1991	Delta Force 3: The Killing Game	A Global Pictures Production	Cannon Pictures	
July 24, 1991	American Kickboxer	A Distant Horizon and Anant Singh Production	Cannon Video	
October 19, 1991	The Borrower	A Vision Pictures Production	Cannon Pictures	
October 25, 1991	The Hitman	A Don Carmody Production	Cannon Pictures	
March 6, 1992	Terminal Bliss	A Distant Horizon and Anant Singh Production	Cannon Pictures	
July 24, 1992	To the Death	An Anant Singh Production	Distant Horizon (South Africa), Cannon Video (US)	
September 2, 1992	The Human Shield	A Christopher Pearce / Elie Cohn Production	Cannon Video	
September 2, 1992	Roots of Evil	A Sidney Niekerk Production	Cannon Video	
February 23, 1993	Prison Heat	A Global Pictures Production	Cannon Video	
February 26, 1993	Fifty/Fifty	A Raymond Wagner / Maurice Singer Production	Cannon Pictures	
March 3, 1993	American Samurai	A Global Pictures Production	Cannon Video	
March 12, 1993	Street Knight	A Mark DiSalle Production	Cannon Pictures	
April 16, 1993	No Place to Hide	An Alan Amiel Production	Cannon Pictures	
April 21, 1993	Walker, Texas Ranger: One Riot, One Ranger [TV]	A Cannon Television, Inc. Production	Broadcast on CBS	
April 24, 1993	Walker, Texas Ranger: Borderline [TV]	A Cannon Television, Inc. Production	Broadcast on CBS	
May 1, 1993	Walker, Texas Ranger: A Shadow in the Night [TV]	A Cannon Television, Inc. Production	Broadcast on CBS	
July 10, 1993	American Ninja V	An Ovidio G. Assonitis Production	Cannon Video	
September 18, 1993	Over the Line	An Ovidio G. Assonitis Production	Cannon Pictures	
October 1993	The Mummy Lives	A Global Pictures Production	Cannon Video	
November 9, 1993	Night Terrors	A Global Pictures Production	Cannon Pictures	
December 3, 1993	Rescue Me	A Richard Alfieri Production	Cannon Pictures	
January 7, 1994	American Cyborg: Steel Warrior	A Global Pictures Production	Cannon Pictures	
1994	Twin Sitters	A Global Pictures Production	Columbia-TriStar	
January 21, 1994	Hellbound	A Cannon Pictures Production in association with Anthony Ridio Productions	Cannon Pictures	
February 17, 1994	Chain of Command	A Cannon Pictures Production	Cannon Video	

=== Pathé Productions ===
The following are films produced by Cannon's sister company Pathé Entertainment (also known as Pathé Communications and MGM-Pathé Communications).
Release Date	Title	Production	Distribution	Ref
September 14, 1990	Death Warrant	A Mark DiSalle / MGM-Pathé Communications Production	Metro-Goldwyn-Mayer (US theatrical), Cannon/Warner Home Video (Netherlands VHS)	
October 19, 1990	Quigley Down Under	A Pathé Entertainment Production	Metro-Goldwyn-Mayer (US), Cannon Tuschinski Film Distribution (Netherlands)	
December 21, 1990	The Russia House	A Pathé Entertainment Production	Metro-Goldwyn-Mayer (US theatrical) / Cannon/VMP (German VHS)	
May 8, 1991	CrissCross	A Hawn/Sylbert Movie Company / MGM-Pathé Communications Production	Metro-Goldwyn-Mayer	
May 24, 1991	Thelma & Louise	A Percy Main / Pathé Entertainment Production	Metro-Goldwyn-Mayer	
May 25, 1991	Timebomb	A Raffaella / MGM-Pathé Communications Production	Metro-Goldwyn-Mayer	
June 7, 1991	Not Without My Daughter	An Ufland / Pathé Entertainment Production	Metro-Goldwyn-Mayer (US), Cannon Tuschinski Film Distribution (Netherlands)	
June 28, 1991	Fires Within	A Nicita/Lloyd / Pathé Entertainment Production	Metro-Goldwyn-Mayer (US theatrical), Cannon VMP (German VHS)	
July 26, 1991	Life Stinks	A Brooksfilms / MGM-Pathé Communications Production	Metro-Goldwyn-Mayer	
August 9, 1991	Delirious	A Richard Donner / MGM-Pathé Communications Production	Metro-Goldwyn-Mayer	
August 23, 1991	Harley Davidson and the Marlboro Man	Krisjair/Laredo / MGM-Pathé Communications Production	Metro-Goldwyn-Mayer	
September 6, 1991	Company Business	A Steven-Charles Jaffe / MGM-Pathé Communications Production	Metro-Goldwyn-Mayer (US theatrical) / Cannon VMP (German VHS)	
September 6, 1991	Crooked Hearts	An A&M Films / MGM-Pathé Communications Production	Metro-Goldwyn-Mayer	
September 13, 1991	Liebestraum	An Initial / Pathé Entertainment Production	Metro-Goldwyn-Mayer	
October 4, 1991	The Man in the Moon	A Mark Rydell / MGM-Pathé Communications Production	Metro-Goldwyn-Mayer	
October 11, 1991	Shattered	A Bodo Scriba/Willi Baer/Capella Films / MGM-Pathé Communications Production	Metro-Goldwyn-Mayer	
December 22, 1991	Rush	A Zanuck Company / MGM-Pathé Communications Production	Metro-Goldwyn-Mayer	
March 27, 1992	The Cutting Edge	An Interscope / MGM-Pathé Communications Production	Metro-Goldwyn-Mayer	
May 15, 1992	The Vagrant	A Brooksfilms / MGM-Pathé Communications Production	Metro-Goldwyn-Mayer	
October 29, 1992	Rich in Love	A Zanuck Company / MGM-Pathé Communications Production	Metro-Goldwyn-Mayer	

=== Theatrical releases ===
The following are films not produced by Cannon or its sister company Pathé but which were theatrically distributed by them.
Release Date	Title	Distribution	Presented by	Country	Ref
March 7, 1989	Tree of Hands	Pathé Releasing Ltd.	Granada Film Productions in association with British Screen	United Kingdom	
April 13, 1989	Working Girl	Cannon Film Distributors		Netherlands	
April 28, 1989	Joyriders	Pathé Releasing Ltd.	Granada Film Productions in association with British Screen	United Kingdom	
September 8, 1989	Kickboxer	A Mark DiSalle / Kings Road Entertainment Production	Cannon Releasing Corporation	United States	
October 6, 1989	Leedvermaak	Cannon Tuschinski Film Distribution	Gys Versluys/Riverside Pictures	Netherlands	
October 13, 1989	Fight for Us (Orapronobis)	Cannon Film Distributors	Cannon International	United States	
November 10, 1989	Sex, Lies, and Videotape	Cannon Film Distributors		Netherlands	
November 10, 1989	Crack House	Cannon Releasing Corporation		United States	
1990	Oddball Hall	Cannon Pictures	Ravenhill Productions, Inc.	United States	
November 16, 1990	The Last Island	Cannon Tuschinski Film Distribution	Laurens Geels and Dick Maas	Netherlands	
December 21, 1990	My Blue Heaven	Cannon Tuschinski Film Distribution	Laurens Geels and Dick Maas	Netherlands	
March 23, 1990	Wings of Fame	Cannon Film Distributors	Laurens Geels and Dick Maas	Netherlands	
April 13, 1990	Cinema Paradiso	Cannon Film Distributors		Netherlands	
June 29, 1990	The Dawning	Cannon Film Distributors		Netherlands	
July 27, 1990	Heart Condition	Cannon Film Distributors		Netherlands	
September 28, 1990	Luba	Cannon Film Distributors		Netherlands	
January 25, 1991	The Comfort of Strangers	Cannon Film Distributors		Netherlands	
October 11, 1991	Only the Lonely	Cannon Film Distributors		Netherlands	
February 15, 1991	Reversal of Fortune	Cannon Film Distributors		Netherlands	
February 21, 1991	Impromptu	Cannon Tuschinski Film Distribution		Netherlands	
March 1, 1991	Eline Vere	Cannon Tuschinski Film Distribution	Matthijs Van Heijningen	Netherlands	
May 24, 1991	Class Action	Cannon Film Distributors		Netherlands	
June 21, 1991	Robin Hood	Cannon Film Distributors		Netherlands	
August 30, 1991	Everybody's Fine	Cannon Tuschinski Film Distribution	Angello Rizzoli	Netherlands	
September 27, 1991	Way Upstream (Stroomopwaarts)	Cannon Tuschinski Film Distribution		Netherlands	

=== Home Video releases ===
The following are other films not produced by Cannon but which were distributed by them and/or via their sister company Pathé on one or more of their numerous home video labels.
Release Date	Title	Label	Catalog #	Country	Ref
1989	Young Dragons: The Kung Fu Kids (好小子)	Cannon Video	31012	United States	
February 22, 1989	Hell Riders	Cannon Video	31052	United States	
April 5, 1989	Bridge to Hell	Cannon Video	31041	United States	
April 5, 1989	The Bronx Executioner	Cannon Video	31042	United States	
April 5, 1989	Cross Mission	Cannon Video	31076	United States	
April 5, 1989	Hot Blood	Cannon Video	31053	United States	
April 5, 1989	Urban Warriors	Cannon Video	31074	United States	
July 26, 1989	Young Dragons: The Kung Fu Kids II (好小子II)	Cannon Video	31062	United States	
1989	Powwow Highway	Cannon Video	31068	United States	
1989	Miami Cops	Cannon Video	31104	United States	
January 31, 1990	Carmilla [TV]	Cannon Video	31110	United States	
May 2, 1990	The Eyes of the Panther [TV]	Cannon Video	31137	United States	
1990	Berlín Blues	Cannon Video	31072	United States	
1990	The Turn of the Screw [TV]	Cannon Video	31109	United States	
1990	The Strange Case of Dr. Jekyll and Mr. Hyde [TV]	Cannon Video	31136	United States	
z
1989	Tai-Pan	Cannon Video [UK]	31094	United Kingdom	
1990	Buying Time	Cannon Video [UK]	31192	United Kingdom	
1994	Walker, Texas Ranger: Something in the Shadows [TV]	Cannon Video [UK]	V032188	United Kingdom	
1989	The Lonely Passion of Judith Hearne	Pathé Video	31005	United Kingdom	
z
1989	I Love N.Y.	Cannon/VMP		Germany	
1989	Speed Zone	Cannon/VMP	5347	Germany	
1989	Robbery	Cannon/VMP	6360	Germany	
1989	White Hot	Cannon/VMP	6366	Germany	
1989	Run for Your Life	Cannon/VMP	6369	Germany	
1989	Return from the River Kwai	Cannon/VMP	6370	Germany	
1990	Cold Front	Cannon/VMP		Germany	
1990	Ghost Writer	Cannon/VMP		Germany	
1990	Girlfriend from Hell	Cannon/VMP	3816	Germany	
1990	Limit Up	Cannon/VMP	5356	Germany	
1990	College Dormitory	Cannon/VMP	5367	Germany	
1990	African Express	Cannon/VMP	5419	Germany	
1990	Nobody's Perfect	Cannon/VMP	5852	Germany	
1990	Lock Up	Cannon/VMP	6378	Germany	
1990	Killer Crocodile 2	Cannon/VMP	6390	Germany	
1990	Rosamunde	Cannon/VMP	7260	Germany	
1990	Everybody Wins	Cannon/VMP	7261	Germany	
1990	Dr. M	Cannon/VMP	7262	Germany	
1990	Lord of the Flies	Cannon/VMP	7263	Germany	
1990	Last Flight to Hell	Cannon/VMP	7264	Germany	
1991	The Ten Million Dollar Grab	Cannon/VMP	5370	Germany	
1991	Naked Tango	Cannon/VMP	5372	Germany	
1991	The Pleasure (Il piacere)	Cannon/VMP	5373	Germany	
1991	The Maid	Cannon/VMP	5378	Germany	
1991	Leona Helmsley: The Queen of Mean	Cannon/VMP	5381	Germany	
1991	Plein fer	Cannon/VMP	5390	Germany	
1991	Teenage Mutant Ninja Turtles: The Movie	Cannon/VMP	5391	Germany	
1991	You're Famous	Cannon/VMP	5397	Germany	
1991	When He's Not a Stranger	Cannon/VMP	5401	Germany	
1991	Shogun's Shadow (将軍家光の乱心 激突)	Cannon/VMP	6387	Germany	
1991	Alligator II: The Mutation	Cannon/VMP	6392	Germany	
1991	High Stakes	Cannon/VMP	6395	Germany	
1991	Narrow Margin	Cannon/VMP	6396	Germany	
1991	In Gold We Trust	Cannon/VMP	6399	Germany	
1991	Night of the Warrior	Cannon/VMP	6400	Germany	
1991	The Last Match	Cannon/VMP	6408	Germany	
1991	Repossessed	Cannon/VMP	6409	Germany	
1991	The Stay Awake	Cannon/VMP	6412	Germany	
1991	Karate Rock (The Kid with Iron Hands)	Cannon/VMP	6413	Germany	
1991	Neon City	Cannon/VMP	6415	Germany	
1991	The Lost Capone	Cannon/VMP	6417	Germany	
1992	Circles in a Forest	Cannon/VMP		Germany	
1992	Kiss Daddy Goodnight	Cannon/VMP		Germany	
1992	Young Soul Rebels	Cannon/VMP		Germany	
1992	Time of Darkness	Cannon/VMP	5394	Germany	
1992	Gloves (K'fafot)	Cannon/VMP	5398	Germany	
1992	Malibu Hot Summer	Cannon/VMP	5400	Germany	
1992	Sleepy Betrayers (Stille Betrüger)	Cannon/VMP	5404	Germany	
1992	Tonight at Alice's (Stasera a casa di Alice)	Cannon/VMP	5411	Germany	
1992	Bisexual	Cannon/VMP	5413	Germany	
1992	This Story of Love (この愛の物語)	Cannon/VMP	5414	Germany	
1992	Death in Brunswick	Cannon/VMP	5417	Germany	
1992	Mississippi Masala	Cannon/VMP	5420	Germany	
1992	The Perfect Tribute	Cannon/VMP	5422	Germany	
1992	Jezebel's Kiss	Cannon/VMP	5423	Germany	
1992	Prospero's Books	Cannon/VMP	5425	Germany	
1992	...Almost	Cannon/VMP	5426	Germany	
1992	Wild Orchid II: Two Shades of Blue	Cannon/VMP	5429	Germany	
1992	Hard Promises	Cannon/VMP	5431	Germany	
1992	That Englishwoman: An Account of the Life of Emily Hobhouse	Cannon/VMP	5432	Germany	
1992	Howard Beach: Making a Case for Murder	Cannon/VMP	6418	Germany	
1992	Stone Cold	Cannon/VMP	6419	Germany	
1992	Mission of the Shark: The Saga of the U.S.S. Indianapolis	Cannon/VMP	6420	Germany	
1992	Lady Dragon	Cannon/VMP	6423	Germany	
1992	The Sandgrass People	Cannon/VMP	6424	Germany	
1992	Afghan Breakdown	Cannon/VMP	6426	Germany	
1992	A Better Tomorrow II (英雄本色2)	Cannon/VMP	6431	Germany	
1992	Sins of the Mother	Cannon/VMP	6432	Germany	
1992	Dadah Is Death [TV]	Cannon/VMP	7270	Germany	
1992	L.A. Takedown	Cannon/VMP	7271	Germany	
1992	Defenseless	Cannon/VMP	7274	Germany	
1993	A Chinese Ghost Story III (倩女幽魂 III)	Cannon/VMP		Germany	
z
1989	The Vanishing (Spoorloos)	Cannon Screen Entertainment [Netherlands]	58 0250 2	Netherlands	
1990	Judgment in Berlin	Cannon Screen Entertainment [Netherlands]	58 0294	Netherlands	
1990	Alien Dead	Cannon Screen Entertainment [Netherlands]	BNL 86050	Netherlands	
1990	Grave Secrets	Cannon Screen Entertainment [Netherlands]	CVL 2002	Netherlands	
1990	Mind Games	Cannon Screen Entertainment [Netherlands]	CVL 2003	Netherlands	
1990	Dead Women in Lingerie	Cannon Screen Entertainment [Netherlands]	CVL 2004	Netherlands	
1990	Enrapture	Cannon Screen Entertainment [Netherlands]	CVL 2006	Netherlands	
1990	Deadly Games (3615 code Père Noël)	Cannon Screen Entertainment [Netherlands]	CW 1009	Netherlands	

== Documentaries ==
The following are documentaries about Cannon Films under the leadership of Menahem Golan and Yoram Globus and later Giancarlo Parretti.
Release Date	Title	Production	Distribution	Ref
1981	Menahem Golan in Hollywood	A Peter Imber Production	UCLA School of Theater, Film, and Television	
May 23, 1986	Omnibus - The Last Moguls	A Christopher Sykes Production	BBC Worldwide	
February 22, 1998	Shooting Versace	A Christopher Sykes Production	BBC Worldwide	
May 16, 2014	The Go-Go Boys: The Inside Story of Cannon Films	A Yariv Horowitz / Roy Lev Production	Other Angle Pictures	
August 2, 2014	Electric Boogaloo: The Wild, Untold Story of Cannon Films	A Brett Ratner / James Packer / Veronica Fury Production	Umbrella Entertainment	
November 14, 2015	Golan: A Farewell to Mr Cinema	A Christopher Sykes Production	Christopher Sykes	
October 18, 2024	The Man Who Definitely Didn’t Steal Hollywood	A Wonderhood Studios Production	Fifth Season	

== See also ==
- Lists of films by studio
- 21st Century Film Corporation
