= Boshen =

Boshen can be a transliteration of several different Chinese-language given names. Notable people and fictional characters with such a name include:

== Real people ==
- Chang Po-shen (Chinese: 張伯燊), Hong Kong actor
- Po-Shen Loh (Chinese: 罗博深; born 1982), American mathematician
- Boshen (Chinese: 伯慎), courtesy name of Zhang Wen (Han dynasty) (died 191), Eastern Han Dynasty official and military general
- Boshen (Chinese: 伯深), courtesy name of Liu Jun (Southern Han) (fl. 8th/9th century), Southern Han Dynasty official

== Fictional characters ==
- Boshen, fictional character in the short story "The Princess of Nebraska", published in the 2005 short story collection A Thousand Years of Good Prayers by Yiyun Li

- Boshen, fictional white American gay man in the 2007 drama film The Princess of Nebraska, adapted from the short story
