= The Vagrants (novel) =

2009 novel by Yiyun Li

- First edition
- Author: Yiyun Li
- Publisher: Random House Publishing Group
- Publication date: 2009
- Pages: 352
- ISBN: 9781588367730

The Vagrants is the first novel by Yiyun Li. It was published in 2009, following her award-winning 2005 short story collection A Thousand Years of Good Prayers. Set in Communist China in 1979, in a small industrial town, the novel follows a variety of characters in the aftermath of the execution of a young local woman for being a counterrevolutionary

== Style ==
The writing echoes Leo Tolstoy or Anton Chekhov and the ideologies of George Orwell and Aleksandr Solzhenitsyn.

Li’s skilful, powerful writing is on full display in the novel. One character describes the sound of life as: “… the moaning of our bones crushed beneath the weight of empty words. … There is no beauty in this crushing and there is alas no escape for us now or ever” (a synecdoche combined with a metaphor). These words are articulated by one of the few positive characters, a man of letters, someone who believed in the power of words. Li is suggesting that words - specifically the hollow, weaponised words of revolutionary ideology - are what destroy. People are arrested and destroyed essentially for speaking, for expressing their own words against the state's words. The vocal cords of the woman executed are cut, silencing her; a child's dog named "Ear" is killed; love letters do not reach their destination. All that prevails is the state's empty ideological slogans. For Li, communist totalitarianism is physically brutal at all times, and it does so by controlling language, and that is enough to obliterate. Fate and Chinese philosophy are also central to the storyline; for example, a character says, “What I own is my fortune, what I’m owed is my fate” and another “Heaven was stingy taking back more often than it gave”.

== Reception ==
The novel won Li the 2009 gold medal of the California Book Award for fiction (her first book won a silver medal).

In its review, The Guardian applauds Li’s book:

The Vagrants is filled with violence and horror … but Li finds room for some humour here and there. It's also written in a brisk, unpretentious way, with very few moments of calculating pathos in spite of the heartrending material on offer”.

Pico Iyer in the New York Times describes the book as part of a widening circle of American stories that are world stories because of the many Americans like Li making a claim to the world as an extension of their homes. Iyer continues:

“If ‘‘The Vagrants’’ sounds like a grim and lightless book, though heart-rending at every turn, it is. Steadily collecting atrocities and amassing paragraphs with the solidity of bricks, it replaces the tender ease and range of some of Li's earlier stories with a much more focused, imprisoned rage.
