= A Thousand Years of Good Prayers (short story collection) =

2005 short story collection by Yiyun Li

- Author: Yiyun Li
- Language: English
- Genre: Short stories
- Publisher: Random House (US)
- Publication date: September 20, 2005
- Publication place: United States
- Media type: Print (hardback & paperback)
- Pages: 224
- ISBN: 978-0812973334
- OCLC: 213382533

A Thousand Years of Good Prayers (2005) is the debut short story collection by Yiyun Li. It is the author's first book of fiction. Two of the stories were adapted into films: the title story and The Princess of Nebraska, both directed by Wayne Wang.

== Contents ==
| Story | Originally published in |
|---|---|
| "Extra" | The New Yorker |
| "After a Life" | Prospect |
| "Immortality" | The Paris Review |
| "The Princess of Nebraska" | Ploughshares |
| "Love in the Marketplace" | |
| "Son" | |
| "The Arrangement" | |
| "Death Is Not a Bad Joke If Told the Right Way" | Glimmer Train |
| "Persimmons" | The Paris Review |
| "A Thousand Years of Good Prayers" | Salamander |

== Synopsis ==
=== "Extra" ===
Granny Lin, a fifty-one-year-old spinster, struggles to find work after she is "honorably retired" from a Beijing garment factory and is denied a pension. Her colleague Auntie Wang recommends that she get married so she can be financially secure with an inheritance. She reluctantly agrees to be matched with Old Tang, a seventy-six year old widower struggling with Alzheimer's disease. Once she is married to him, she has to pretend that Old Tang's previous wife is still alive but ill at the hospital. One day, while they are bathing, Old Tang gains some lucidity, and in a fit of rage and confusion, slips in the bathroom and dies.

After the funeral, the family gives her no inheritance, leaving her financially unstable once more. However, one of Old Tang's sons recommends her for a job as a maid at the Mei-Mei Academy, a primary boarding school in the mountainous western suburb of Beijing. There, she develops a bond with Kang, a newly arrived, six-year-old student. She learns that his father is a wealthy agricultural entrepreneur. Kang was sent away because he is the child of the first, now-divorced wife of the tycoon. Because no one comes for him on the weekends, he and Granny Lin bond with each other at the school, taking walks and telling stories during this time until the school week resumes.

Months into her employment, complaints of missing girls' socks arise. Granny Lin discovers that Kang is collecting the socks and keeping them in his pillow case. However, instead of returning the socks or telling anyone, she goes to the city to buy similar socks and mixes them back into the girls' laundry. When Kang's roommate tries to play a prank of him in the middle of the night, he notices Kang stroking his cheeks with his hands gloved with the socks; this results in the entire school alienating Kang. One weekend, Kang decides to hide indefinitely. Terrified, Granny Lin involves the authorities, but Kang shows up shortly thereafter. After Kang claims to not have been lost, the school places the blame on the socks on Granny Lin's apparent senility and dismiss her. While walking through the city, a thief snatches her duffel bag and runs off; however, she has lost little, as she has placed her severance pay and extra girls' socks in her lunch pail.

=== "After a Life" ===
Mr. and Mrs. Su, elderly, married first-cousins who live together in Beijing, take care of their twenty-eight-year-old daughter Beibei who has mental retardation and cerebral palsy. While having breakfast, they receive a call from Mrs. Fong, who suspects that her husband is having an affair; Mrs. Su assures her that Mr. Fong is having breakfast with Mr. Su and he leaves to go to the stockbrokerage.

A year prior, Mr. Su and Mr. Fong met each other while trading. A month after their meeting, Mr. Fong confessed that he was seeing a woman in her forties while Mrs. Fong was in prison for money laundering. After Mr. Fong is comforted, he loans Mr. Su some money indefinitely for investing.

Mrs. Fong, who was released early due to deteriorating health, calls again to tell Mrs. Su that she will hire a detective to find out if Mr. Fong is seeing another woman. Initially, Mrs. Su worries about Mr. Su getting caught between the crossfires of implication, but then Beibei takes her attention away from Mrs. Fong. As she cares for Beibei, she is struck with nostalgia. The Sus fell in love when they were young and had gone against everyone when they married and had Beibei. Ten years later, they tried to normalize their lives by having another child, Jian, who was born without complications.

While working at the stockbrokerage, Mr. Su ruminates about how he tried to test fate by having Beibei. Jian was supposed to bring them closer, but their happiness declined even more. After finishing his work at the firm that day, he find a drunk Mr. Fong; Mr. Su decides to bring his woozy friend to his house. Meanwhile, after having given Beibei sleep medicine, Mrs. Su receives another call; Mrs. Fong tells of how Mr. Fong confessed to her and recommended that the paramour live with them as a second wife to which Mrs. Fong responded with outrage. After Mr. Su helps Mr. Fong fall asleep on the couch and Mrs. Su starts to ignore Mrs. Fong, the Sus head to Beibei's room to examine her and find her with a "bluish tone" suggesting that she is dead. Mr. Su strokes Mrs. Su's hair, and the couple remembers when they were young.

=== "Immortality" ===
For generations, a small village has consistently produced Great Papas for the imperial families of Dynastic China. When imperial rule ends and the Communist party takes control of the nation, the village falls out of favor with the ruling power and loses its reputation.

During a nationwide famine, a boy tries to steal a sparrow for his sick mother; one of the villagers castigates him for this. When the others realize that the boy bears the face of the dictator, they let him take as many birds as he wants. During his upbringing, the villagers pay keen attention to keeping him out of harm's way, fearing injury to him will cause them bad luck; however, they also refuse to interact with him, especially keen to keeping their daughters away from him. After the dictator's death, the community goes into a state of mourning, not hearing from the boy (who is now a young man) for years.

One day, when he is in his late twenties, he leaves the village via car for the capital. After many auditions followed by trials, the young man is selected as the dictator's impersonator, starring in films and becoming a recognizable celebrity. When the young man is in his forties and western influences enter the nation's conscience, he begins to doubt his role. Prior, he was a virgin who saw himself too "great" for a woman's body; after reading a biography of the dictator, he begins to incessantly crave sex. As a result, he attempts to secretly fulfill his desires with a prostitute; however, the pimp sets-up the young man, taking embarrassing photographs of him and threatening to release them to the public unless he pays a king's ransom. The young man refuses, and after the photographs' release, he is disgracefully discharged by the party.

When the young man returns to the village, he ignores all the greetings from the villagers and heads straight for his mother's grave. There, he "cleans" himself, but survives the bleeding and subsequently lives the rest of his life in the village.

=== "The Princess of Nebraska" ===
Sasha, a half-Chinese, half-Mongolian international student, takes a Greyhound with Boshen, a friend of her fetus' father, from Nebraska to Chicago to get an abortion.

In China, Boshen is a gay doctor who advocated for AIDS awareness when he meets Yang, a Nan Dan (also the father of Sasha's fetus). After Yang is expelled from the Peking opera school for his homosexuality, he starts working as a prostitute. Boshen pays for Yang's services and eventually they start a relationship, despite there being a huge age gap. One night at a party, Yang meets Sasha and they become acquainted. Despite knowing that she will leave for the United States for graduate school soon, she starts an affair with Yang; one night, near the end of their relationship, she is impregnated by him when they have intercourse without a condom.

Boshen insist that Sasha contact Yang once more before going through with the abortion to see if he wants to join her in the states. She reveals that she had tried but Yang was reluctant. As the two watch the winter holiday parade, the fetus kicks, and Sasha thinks about what it would mean to be a mother.

=== "Love in the Marketplace" ===
Sansan and Tu, childhood friends from the same town, end up going to the same university in Beijing; there, they meet Min, a student activist who participants in the Tiananmen Square demonstrations who is also Sansan's dormmate. Sansan and Tu get better acquainted because they are the only two students in their collective friends circle that do not demonstrate; eventually, they become engaged. After the crackdown by the government, only students with relatives in the United States can study abroad there. Sansan, feeling pity for the government backlash against Min, tells Tu (who supposedly has an uncle living in the states) to marry Min and takes her with him during his graduate studies in Pennsylvania, with the promise to divorce Min and return to Beijing after Min is sponsored in the states. Even though Tu suggests that he and Sansan have sex before his departure, she refuses, citing a passage from Women in Love about how doing so will make him crave other women more. Despite their promise, Tu falls in love with Min and does not return.

Ten years later, Sansan becomes an English teacher in Beijing and regularly shows Casablanca to her students. One day, her mother shows up at the school to inform her that Tu has recently divorced Min and wants to marry Sansan. Later that day, after ruminating on the past, Sansan goes to confront her mother in the marketplace, who works there as an egg vendor. They argue about Tu's proposal and Sansan ultimately tells her mother that she is no long interested in Tu. Her mother responds by citing that since she is no longer a virgin, no man wants to marry her, reiterating the town's belief that she and Tu did have sex before he left. Some time later, an uncouthly-dressed man enters the marketplace with a sign reading: "Give me ten yuan and I will let you slice me once wherever you like; if you finish my life with one cut, you owe me nothing." A crowd gathers around him. Sansan's mother, thinking the man a beggar, gives the man ten yuan and he holds a knife to her; she refuses to touch it. He subsequently returns the money. Sansan takes the money, gives it to the man, takes the knife, and slashes him on the shoulder, finally finding someone she "loves."

=== "Son" ===
Han, a thirty-three-year-old gay man, returns to Beijing on vacation from the United States to see his mother. Instead of matchmaking for him as she usually does, she gives him gold jewelry and asks him to go to church with her. That request repulses him, as he does not value religion. The next day when they go to church, he opts out, but before waiting for his mother at the nearby Starbucks, a boy and a girl in rags ask Han and his mother for money. She offers the children money to accompany her to church, but Han counters by offering double the amount if they do not go inside. The children take Han's offer and leave, and his mother goes inside. While Han waits, he notices an automobile accident in the periphery but does not go to look, fearing it could involve the children he gave money to before. When his mother comes out, he tells her that he is gay, thinking that she will despise him, but she instead tells him that she loves him for who he is.

=== "The Arrangement" ===
Young Ruolan learns from her godfather-like Uncle Bing that her parents married each other knowing both had secrets that would make a happy marriage impossible. Her mother is a "stone woman," and her father loves an older widow; their marriage was an "arrangement" for both of them. After many years of living apart but still remaining legally married, her father asks for a divorce, to which her mother says that he will have to take her to court.

Ruolan is indifferent to much of divorce. Knowing he is in love with her mother, she asks Uncle Bing to run away with her telling him "that what a mother owes, a daughter pays back." He refuses as he has always loved Ruolan's mother, and he's "one of those fools who puts a magic leaf in front of his eyes and stops seeing mountains and seas."

=== "Death Is Not a Bad Joke If Told the Right Way" ===
A young girl nicknamed "Little Blossom" stays with family friends, the Pangs, for a week every summer and winter in a quadrangle in Beijing. There she gets to be more free and bonds with the people in the house, including both Mr. Pang and Mrs. Pang. She learns of their secrets, which she remembers fondly until the day they have both passed.

=== "Persimmons" ===
Lao Da, a widower whose son was killed in a drowning "accident," kills seventeen people he feels were responsible for the incident. Members of his community weigh in on his motive and the justification of the incident; most agree that while his actions are extreme, they are justified given the current corrupt system that took Lao Da's "softness like a persimmon" for granted.

=== "A Thousand Years of Good Prayers" ===
Mr. Shi, a retired rocket scientist, goes to visit his daughter in the United States after her divorce. However, his relationship with her is strained, lacking conversation. He attempts to take care of her, but is frustrated with her lack of communication with him, especially when observing her communication with her lover in English. Despite her frequent requests for him to return to China or sight see in America alone, Shi insists on staying with her until she is "recovered." Meanwhile, he befriends an elderly Iranian woman he calls "Madam," with whom he converses with about his life, though they do not share a language. Eventually, Shi and his daughter break into a fight, which ends with her calling into question the truth of his job as a "rocket scientist."

Regaling the uncomprehending Madam, Mr. Shi reveals his past: In the midst of the Cultural Revolution, Mr. Shi became close to a woman who worked for him punching time cards. Under the impression that he was having an affair, his superiors gave him the option of terminating the relationship with the woman or losing his job. He refused, denying the relationship and was subsequently harshly demoted. The woman was taken away, never to be seen again. Though he never told his wife, maintaining his claim that he was a "rocket scientist," he realizes that she had figured out what had transpired from the rumors and gossip around him. As he tells his story to Madam, he begins to realize that despite the lack of physical intimacy, he had committed a sort of infidelity in his closeness to this other woman that he couldn't admit to anyone, even himself. As he finishes talking to Madam, he says, "It is what we sacrifice that makes life meaningful."

== Reception ==
Writing in The Guardian, Michel Faber notes that "A Thousand Years of Good Prayers is the best possible revenge against the insular simple-mindedness that once ruled Chinese literature." Contributing to The New York Times, Fatema Ahmed writes that "Li is a valuable firsthand guide to this decade of mind-bending change" and "Li's ability to write about both her native and adoptive countries [...] makes her a skillful double agent."

== Awards and honors ==
Awards for A Thousand Years of Good Prayers
| Year | Award | Result | Ref. |
|---|---|---|---|
| 2005 | Frank O'Connor International Short Story Award | Winner | |
| 2006 | Hemingway Foundation/PEN Award | Winner | |
| 2006 | Guardian First Book Award | Winner | |
| 2006 | Whiting Award for Fiction | Winner | |
| 2006 | California Book Award for Fiction | Winner | |
