= To the Death =

To the Death may refer to:

- "To the Death" (Star Trek: Deep Space Nine), a 1996 Star Trek: Deep Space Nine episode
- To the Death (M.O.P. album), 1994
- To the Death (Earth Crisis album), 2009
- To the Death (1917 film), a 1917 silent film
- To the Death (1993 film), a 1993 South African martial arts film
- To the Death (audio drama), a Doctor Who audio drama
