= Wednesday's Child (short story collection) =

2023 short story collection by Yiyun Li

- Author: Yiyun Li
- Genre: Short stories, literary fiction
- Publisher: Farrar, Straus and Giroux
- Publication date: September 5, 2023
- Pages: 256
- ISBN: 978-0374606374
- Preceded by: The Book of Goose

Wednesday's Child is a 2023 short story collection by Chinese writer Yiyun Li, published by Farrar, Straus and Giroux. It includes 11 stories Li had written over the course of 14 years, all of which originally appeared in The New Yorker, Zoetrope: All-Story, and Esquire. The book was a finalist for the 2024 Pulitzer Prize for Fiction.

== Stories ==
Title	Original publication
"Wednesday's Child"	The New Yorker
"A Sheltered Woman"	The New Yorker
"Hello, Goodbye"	The New Yorker
"A Small Flame"	The New Yorker
"On the Street Where You Live"	The New Yorker
"Such Common Life" –"Protein" –"Hypothesis" –"Contract"	Zoetrope: All-Story
"A Flawless Silence"	The New Yorker
"Let Mothers Doubt"	Esquire
"Alone"	The New Yorker
"When We Were Happy We Had Other Names"	The New Yorker
"All Will Be Well"	The New Yorker

== Critical reception ==
In addition to being a finalist for the 2024 Pulitzer Prize for Fiction, the book was a finalist for the Story Prize, the Los Angeles Times Book Prize for Fiction, and the Mark Twain American Voice in Literature Award.

In a starred review, Kirkus Reviews called the stories "Quiet, beautiful accounts of journeys through hell." Also in a starred review, Publishers Weekly called it a "splendid and elegantly observed collection" and wrote that "these stories find Li at the top of her game."

The New York Times called the book a "triumphant, if more oblique, excavation of aging." The Times Literary Supplement observed the collection's "themes of care-taking and loss" and wrote it "may be full of woe, but it is also full of wonder." The Asian Review of Books called it "perhaps the most compelling yet" of Li's short story collections. One reviewer in The Guardian called the stories "bruising, beautiful tales"; another observed Li's approach to themes of grief. The Chicago Review of Books lauded Li's consistent writing of her subject matter, stating that "she’s once again shown us why she’s remained such a treasured guide to the lands of grief over the past twenty-plus years." NPR noted that "compassion, coupled with Li's gorgeous prose and painstaking attention to detail, is what makes these stories so beautiful, so accomplished."

Kirkus Reviews, Esquire, and Vulture included the book on their respective Best Books of 2023 lists. Los Angeles Times considered it an anticipated read for fall and later placed it on their Best Novels of 2023 list. NPR placed it on their Books We Love list for 2023.
