= Superfights =

1995 American-Hong Kong film by Tony Leung Siu-hung

- Film poster
- Directed by: Tony Leung Siu-Hung
- Written by: Keith W. Strandberg
- Produced by: Keith W. Strandberg
- Starring: Brandon Gaines; Yu Feihong; Keith Vitali; Chuck Jeffreys; Cliff Lenderman; Brian Ruth; Patrick Lung
- Cinematography: Derek Wan
- Edited by: Allan Poon
- Music by: Richard Yuen
- Production company: Seasonal Film Corporation
- Release date: 24 July 1997 (United States)
- Running time: 94 minutes
- Countries: United States; Hong Kong
- Language: English

Superfights (fully titled as Karate Tiger 9: Superfights) is a 1995 martial arts film directed and choreographed by Tony Leung Siu-Hung. The film stars newcomer Brandon Gaines, Chinese actress Yu Feihong, and martial artists Keith Vitali, Chuck Jeffreys, Cliff Lenderman, and Brian Ruth amongst others. The film was the first American production by Hong Kong-based Seasonal Film Corporation since their 1991 film American Shaolin.

== Plot ==
Jack Cody is an avid fan of the Superfights, a pay-per-view hybrid of martial arts and professional wrestling. He laments the mysterious disappearance of his favorite Superfighter, Mike Rocco, who once gave Jack a souvenir pendant when he was a child. Jack aspires to become a Superfighter himself, despite his mother's disapproval.

After preventing a young woman named Sally Wong from being mugged at an ATM, Jack becomes a national celebrity and gains the attention of Robert Sawyer, the owner of the Superfights; Jack accepts his offer to join the organization. He is nicknamed "The All-American Hero" and assigned to train with Angel, one of the top female Superfighters, who begins to flirt with Jack and provides him with pills which she says are vitamins. After many weeks of intense training, Sawyer declares that he is ready for his first Superfight.

Prior to the fight, Jack befriends fellow Superfighters Budokai and Dark Cloud in the locker room. With Sally's encouragement, Jack wins his debut match and soon goes on a winning streak. When Angel attempts to seduce him, Jack turns her down, unwilling to start a romance with his friend and trainer.

On a morning jog, Jack is confronted by a mysterious ninja who taunts and subdues him after a brief fight. The ninja informs him that the Superfighters are involved in various illegal activities across the city, ranging from drug dealing to murder. He advises Jack to get out while he still can, and also warns him not to take the pills.

Later, Sally's grandfather invites Jack to come and train with Sally in the art of Tai Chi, which Jack uses to improve his fighting style. Grandfather also analyzes the "vitamins", a combination of steroids and mind control drugs distributed by Sawyer, an organized crime boss who deploys his greatest fighter "The Beast" to kill a crooked dealer. When Sawyer and Angel are ambushed by the dealer's brother and his henchmen the next morning, Sawyer fights back and defeats them with ease.

Jack is told to throw a match against Dark Cloud as part of his contract, but he refuses and wins the fight instead. Sawyer berates Jack for his disobedience, then forces him to join Budokai, Night Stalker, and Dark Cloud to extort money from a local Chinese restaurant. Afterwards, Jack secretly observes the Beast going berserk on Sawyer's men before being subdued by a tranquilizer dart.

When Jack returns home, the ninja reappears and attacks him. However, Jack gets the upper hand and unmasks the ninja; it is Budokai, who has been working with the police undercover to take down Sawyer. Budokai also explains that the Beast is Mike Rocco, Jack's childhood hero who has been forced to become Sawyer's top enforcer. Jack agrees to join Budokai in his endeavor.

Jack is invited by Sawyer to witness a fight between the Beast and Budokai, whose cover has been blown. The Beast nearly kills Budokai until Jack intervenes and shows the Beast his souvenir pendant. The Beast then turns on Sawyer, who retaliates and kills the Beast with a stomp to the neck. Back at home, Grandfather suggests that he and Jack focus their "chi" on Budokai to heal his injuries. Sawyer then kidnaps Sally and Jack's mother and challenges Jack to a final fight.

At the Superfights training grounds, Jack takes on Sawyer in a steel cage with a pendulum wrapped in barbed wire. Jack escapes the cage and incapacitates Sawyer, then defeats Dark Cloud and Night Stalker. Conflicted by her loyalty to Sawyer, Angel poises to fight Jack, but relents and allows him to free Sally and his mother. Sawyer launches a sneak attack and moves to finish off Jack, but Angel intercepts and fights Sawyer, who fatally injures her with a kick to the throat.

As Jack and Sawyer resume their fight, Sally turns off the lights and yells for Jack to concentrate. Jack utilizes his Tai Chi training to deflect Sawyer's attacks before dropkicking him back into the cage, where he is impaled on the barbed wire pendulum. Angel gives her last words to Jack as she dies. The police arrive as does Grandfather and a somewhat recuperated Budokai. Grandfather hails Jack as a true American hero.

== Cast ==
- Brandon Gaines as Jack Cody "the All-American Hero"
- Yu Feihong as Sally Wong
- Keith Vitali as Robert Sawyer
- Chuck Jeffreys as Dark Cloud
- Cliff Lenderman as No Mercy Budokai
- Brian Ruth as Night Stalker
- Patrick Lung as Grandfather
- Kelly Gallant as Angel
- Karen Bill as Mrs. Cody
- Keith Hackney as The Enforcer
- Jim Steele as Mike Rocco "The Beast"
- Rob Van Dam as The Mercenary
- Keith W. Strandberg as Passerby

== Production ==
The film was shot on location in Harrisburg, Pennsylvania in early 1995. The film was inspired by the 1990s steroid scandal that rocked World Wrestling Entertainment. The character of Robert Sawyer was based on WWE Chairman Vince McMahon, who was accused in the 1990s of giving his wrestlers steroids. However, McMahon was eventually acquitted of the charges.

== Release ==
Superfights was theatrically released in the Philippines by MovieArts Inc. on 13 March 1996. American Home Entertainment released the film on home video in the United States on 24 July 1997. Pathfinder Home Entertainment released the film on Region 1 DVD on 1 July 2003.
