= Faye Yu =

Chinese actress

- 俞飞鸿
- Born: 15 January 1971 (age 55); Hangzhou, Zhejiang, China
- Occupations: Actress, occasional director, producer, screenwriter and singer
- Years active: 1980–present
- Political party: Chinese Communist Party
- Awards: Beijing College Student Film Festival for Best Directorial Debut; 2010 Eternal Beloved

Chinese name
- Simplified Chinese: 俞飞鸿
- Traditional Chinese: 俞飛鴻
Transcriptions
Standard Mandarin
- Hanyu Pinyin: Yú Fēihóng
Yue: Cantonese
- Jyutping: Jyu^{4} Fei^{1}-hung^{4}

Yu Feihong (Chinese: 俞飞鸿; born 15 January 1971), also known as Faye Yu, is a Chinese actress and an occasional film director and producer, best known in the west for Wayne Wang's award-winning American films A Thousand Years of Good Prayers (2007) and The Joy Luck Club (1992). In the Chinese-speaking world she is best known for starring in a number of popular Chinese television series.

== Biography ==
Yu was born into a senior intellectual family in Hangzhou, Zhejiang, on 15 January 1971. Her father graduated from Tsinghua University and her mother graduated from Zhejiang University of Technology. She has an older sister and a younger brother.

Yu was a child actress, having a lead role in the film The Murderer and the Craven when she was only 16. In 1991, while studying at the Beijing Film Academy, China's most prestigious film school, she became the first enrolled student in school history to be cast in a Hollywood production when Wayne Wang selected her for his film The Joy Luck Club. It took 3 months for her to receive an American visa, but Wang stuck with her. She returned to Beijing after filming, taught at the school for a while upon graduation, later studying in Los Angeles, before returning to China in 1998 to star in the television drama Hand-in-Hand which became a huge domestic hit. She followed up on its success with Yuen Woo-ping's 1999 wuxia TV drama Legend of Dagger Li, a Mainland-Taiwan co-production based on the popular Xiaoli Feidao novels.

Between 2005 and 2008 she only chose 1 acting project, A Thousand Years of Good Prayers, which briefly brought her back to the U.S. and reunited her with Wang. She spent most of her years then working on Eternal Beloved, her directorial debut that she also wrote (based on a novel), starred in, and produced. The film crashed in the Chinese box office, but won Yu the Best Directorial Debut Award at the Beijing College Student Film Festival.

== Filmography ==
=== Film ===
Year	English title	Original title	Role	Notes
1980	Bamboo	竹		
1982	The Brilliant Colored Ball	闪光的彩球		
1987	The Murderer and the Craven	凶手与懦夫	Chen Xiaofen	
1987	Love in Beijing	爱在北京	Yun	
1990	Factory Girls	特区打工妹	Chunhua	
1993	Beijing Bastards	北京杂种	Mao Mao	
1993	The Joy Luck Club		Ying-Ying (young)	
1994	Heaven and Earth	天地	Wu Jun	
1995	Superfights		Sally Wong	
1999	The House	梦幻田园	Lei An'an	
1999	Something About Secret	说出你的秘密		cameo
2001	X-Roads	新十字街头	Mei Qing	
2001	Beijing Rocks	北京乐与路	Qianjie	
2007	A Thousand Years of Good Prayers		Yilan Shi	
2009	Eternal Beloved	愛有來生	Mo Xiaoyu	also writer, director, producer Won—Best Directorial Debut, Beijing College Student Film Festival
2010	Color Me Love	爱出色		
2014	The Galaxy on Earth	天河		
2014	The Crossing	太平輪	Madame Gu	
2016	The New Year's Eve of Old Lee	过年好	Li Yangduo's partner	
2017	Wu Kong	悟空傳	Hua Ji	
2017	Murder on the Orient Express		Voiced	
2019	Wish You Were Here	在乎你	Yuan Yuan	
2021	Love After Love	第一炉香	Mrs. Liang	
2024	Decoded	解密	Ye Xiaoning	

=== TV Series ===
Year	English title	Original title	Role	Notes
1998	Hand-in-Hand	牵手	Wang Chun	Nominated—Outstanding Actress, Flying Apsaras Awards
1998	Lang Zi Da Qing Chai	浪子大欽差		
1999	Legend of Dagger Li	小李飛刀	Yang Yan	
2000	Together Life or Death	生死同行	Shu Wenjing	
2000	There Are Dreams in Life	人生有夢	Chen Luyi	
2000	Luan Shi Tao Hua	亂世桃花	Liu Xu	
2000	Ce Ma Xiao Xi Feng	策馬嘯西風	Gao Yuhan	
2001	Third Master's Sword	三少爺的劍	Murong Qiudi	
2002	The Night of Naval Port	軍港之夜	Xia Haiyun	
2002	Chinese Soccer	中國足球	Lan Xin	
2003	The Worry-free Princess	無憂公主	Pan Youdi	
2003	The Grand Mansion 2	大宅門II	Wu Yingyu	
2004	The Emperor of the Ming Dynasty	大明天子	Xu Miaoyun	
2004	Zheng Yi Ling Tian Xia	正義令天下	Zhong Ziying	
2005	Xiang Qi Mi Ren	香氣迷人	Yu Su	
2005	Feng Chui Yun Dong Xing Bu Dong	風吹雲動星不動	Yinxing	
2005	I Love You, Goodbye	我愛你,再見	He Dan	also producer, presenter, theme song singer
2011	Men	男人帮	Shanli	
2014	May–December Love	大丈夫	Gu Xiaoyan	
2014	The Great Southern Migration	大南遷	Madame Li	
2015	The Merchants of Qing Dynasty	大清鹽商	Xiao Wenshu	
2016	The Identity of Father	父親的身份	Zheng Yi	
2016	May–December Love 2	小丈夫	Yao Lan	
2016	Eastern Battlefield	東方戰場	Soong Mei-ling	
2016	Happy Season	幸福的季节	Qin Qin	
2020	Marry to the West	洋嫁	Xie Qiao	
2021	The Dragnet	刑警之海外行动	Shi Yanan	
2021	Anti-Corruption Storm	风雨送春归	Xu Ying	

== Sources ==
- Yu Feihong juggles jobs in new film
- Wayne Wang & Faye Yu Interviews
- (in Chinese) 38岁俞飞鸿：我是宅女，没有秘密结婚
