= Keith Vitali =

American writer

- Born: 1951 (age 74–75); United States
- Occupations: Martial artist, actor, writer, producer, insurance agent
- Spouse: Kathy Vitali
- Website: keithvitalienterprises.com

Keith Vitali (born December 24, 1951) is an American karate master, former number one ranked full-contact fight champion, martial artist, actor, producer, author, and activist, best known for films such as Revenge of the Ninja, Wheels on Meals, No Retreat, No Surrender 3: Blood Brothers, and American Kickboxer.

His introduction into martial arts came in 1975 at the University of South Carolina, where he was awarded his first black belt after two years. Over the course of the next ten years, Vitali competed in a large number of martial arts tournaments, winning most of them, as well as being ranked the "#1 Karate Fighter in the USA". His number of wins landed him an honored place in Black Belt Magazine's Black Belt Hall of Fame in 1981. The magazine also named Vitali as one of the ten best fighters of all time.

Vitali has appeared in a number of martial arts films, including Superfights, Revenge of the Ninja, Wheels on Meals, The Cut Off, No Retreat, No Surrender 3: Blood Brothers, and American Kickboxer. Vitali has since focused on producing child safety videos and writing children's literature. His book on bullying entitled, "Bullyproof Your Child" was released in fall 2007.

Vitali has also written a screenplay on Daniel Boone's life. Trajen Pictures was scheduled to shoot the film in 2012.
