= Yiyun Li =

Chinese writer and professor (born 1972)

- 李翊雲
- Li at the Politics and Prose bookstore in 2026
- Born: 1972 (age 53–54); Beijing, China
- Education: Peking University (BS); University of Iowa (MS, MFA)
- Occupations: Author, professor
- Children: 2 (both deceased)
- Writing career
- Language: English
- Notable works: A Thousand Years of Good Prayers; The Vagrants; The Book of Goose
- Notable awards: MacArthur Fellow (2010); Guggenheim Fellow (2020); Pulitzer Prize (2026)

Yiyun Li (simplified Chinese: 李翊云; traditional Chinese: 李翊雲; pinyin: Lǐ Yìyún) (born 1972) is a Chinese-born writer. She writes exclusively in English. Her short stories and novels have won several awards, including the PEN/Hemingway Award and Guardian First Book Award for A Thousand Years of Good Prayers, the 2020 PEN/Jean Stein Book Award for Where Reasons End, the 2023 PEN/Faulkner Award for Fiction for The Book of Goose, and the 2026 Pulitzer Prize for Things in Nature Merely Grow. She is an editor of the Brooklyn-based literary magazine A Public Space.

== Biography ==
Li was born and raised in Beijing, China. Her mother was a teacher and her father worked as a nuclear physicist. In Dear Friend, from My Life I Write to You in Your Life, Li recounts moments from her early life, including abuse by her mother.

In 1991, Li fulfilled a compulsory year of service in the People's Liberation Army in Xinyang as part of her obligations before pursuing her college education. After earning a Bachelor of Science at Peking University in 1996, she moved to the U.S. In 2000, she earned a Master of Science in immunology at the University of Iowa. She left a PhD program in immunology to pursue writing. In 2005, she earned a Master of Fine Arts in creative nonfiction and fiction from The Nonfiction Writing Program and the Writers' Workshop at the University of Iowa.

Li's stories and essays have been published in The New Yorker, The Paris Review, Harper's, and Zoetrope: All-Story. In 2007, two of the stories from A Thousand Years of Good Prayers were adapted into films directed by Wayne Wang: The Princess of Nebraska and the title story, which Li adapted herself.

From 2005 to 2008, Li lived in Oakland, California, with her husband and their two sons. During that time, she taught at Mills College. In 2008, she moved from Oakland to join the faculty at the Department of English at the University of California, Davis. Since 2017, she has taught creative writing at Princeton University.

Li had a breakdown in 2012 and attempted suicide twice. After recuperating and leaving the hospital, she lost interest in writing fiction. For a whole year, she focused on reading several biographies, memoirs, diaries and journals. According to her, reading about other people's lives "was a comfort".

As a result of her experiences with depression, she wrote her 2017 memoir Dear Friend. A few months after the book was published, her 16-year-old son, Vincent, died by suicide. She explored this in her 2019 novel Where Reasons End.

In September 2022, Li published The Book of Goose, a tale of a literary hoax spun by two 13-year-old girls in postwar France. The New York Times called it "an existential fable that illuminates the tangle of motives behind our writing of stories." In April 2023, the novel won the PEN/Faulkner Award for Fiction.

Li has taught fiction at the University of California, Davis, and is a professor of creative writing at the Lewis Center for the Arts at Princeton University.

Li was appointed the Director of the Creative Writing Program at Princeton University in 2022, succeeding Jhumpa Lahiri.

On February 16, 2024, Li's 19-year-old son, James, was fatally hit by a train in Princeton. The Middlesex County Medical Examiner's Office ruled his death a suicide. In 2025, Li published Things in Nature Merely Grow, a memoir about Vincent's and James's deaths and an exploration of the ways in which words fail but are still necessary. It was shortlisted for the 2025 National Book Award for Nonfiction and longlisted for the 2025 National Book Critics Circle Award for Autobiography.

In October 2026, Li published Music Against the Night, a historical novel about the Irish composer John Field and his wife, the pianist Adelaide Percheron. It is the first book in a planned trilogy, the "Nocturne Trilogy". Li has said she was midway through writing it when her son James died.

== Award and honors ==
Li has received several notable fellowships, including the Lannan Foundation residency in Marfa, Texas; a MacArthur Foundation fellowship; and a Guggenheim Fellowship.

In 2007, Granta included Li on its list of the 21 best young American novelists. In 2010, she was listed among The New Yorker's "20 Under 40".

In 2012, Li was selected as a judge for The Story Prize after having been a finalist for the award in 2010, and in 2013, she judged the Man Booker International Prize.

In 2014, Li won The American Academy of Arts and Letters's Benjamin H. Danks Award. In 2020, she won the Windham-Campbell Literature Prize for Fiction, and in 2022, she won the PEN/Malamud Award, which "recognizes writers who have demonstrated exceptional achievement in the short story form."

In 2023, Li was elected as a Royal Society of Literature International Writer.

In 2024, Li was named a finalist for The Story Prize.

Li was chosen to serve as a judge for the 2024 Booker Prize, alongside Edmund de Waal (chair), Sara Collins, Justine Jordan, and Nitin Sawhney.

In 2026, Li received an Andrew Carnegie Medal and a Pulitzer Prize.

Awards for Li's writing
Year	Title	Award	Result	Ref.
2005	A Thousand Years of Good Prayers	Frank O'Connor International Short Story Award	Winner	
2006	A Thousand Years of Good Prayers	California Book Award for Fiction	Winner	
2006	A Thousand Years of Good Prayers	Guardian First Book Award	Winner	
2006	A Thousand Years of Good Prayers	PEN/Hemingway Award for Debut Novel	Winner	
2006	—	Whiting Award for Fiction	Winner	
2010	Gold Boy, Emerald Girl	The Story Prize	Finalist	
2010	The Vagrants	RUSA Notable Books for Adults	Selection	
2011	Gold Boy, Emerald Girl	Frank O'Connor International Short Story Award	Shortlist	
2011	Gold Boy, Emerald Girl	NCIBA Book of the Year Award for Fiction	Winner	
2011	Gold Boy, Emerald Girl	St. Francis College Literary Prize	Finalist	
2011	The Vagrants	International Dublin Literary Award	Finalist	
2015	"A Sheltered Woman"	Sunday Times Short Story Award	Winner	
2020	Where Reasons End	PEN/Jean Stein Book Award	Winner	
2023	The Book of Goose	Andrew Carnegie Medal for Excellence in Fiction	Longlist	
2023	The Book of Goose	PEN/Faulkner Award for Fiction	Winner	
2024	Wednesday's Child	Pulitzer Prize	Finalist	
2025	Things in Nature Merely Grow	Baillie Gifford Prize	Longlist	
2025	Things in Nature Merely Grow	National Book Award for Nonfiction	Finalist	
2025	Things in Nature Merely Grow	National Book Critics Circle Award for Autobiography	Longlist	
2026	Things in Nature Merely Grow	Andrew Carnegie Medal	Winner	
2026	Things in Nature Merely Grow	Pulitzer Prize for Memoir or Autobiography	Winner	

== Publications ==
=== Novels ===
- — (2009). The Vagrants. New York: Random House. ISBN 978-1-4000-6313-0. LCCN 2008023467. OCLC 229028064.
- — (2014). Kinder Than Solitude. New York: Random House. ISBN 978-1-4000-6814-2. LCCN 2013017307. OCLC 842323189.
- — (2019). Where Reasons End. New York: Random House. ISBN 978-1-984817-37-2. LCCN 2018013429. OCLC 1030447783.
- — (2020). Must I Go. New York: Random House. ISBN 978-0-399-58912-6. LCCN 2019048747. OCLC 1125306132.
- — (2022). The Book of Goose. New York: Farrar, Straus and Giroux. ISBN 978-0-374-60634-3. LCCN 2022022703. OCLC 1289234580.
- — (2026). Music Against the Night. New York: Farrar, Straus and Giroux. ISBN 978-0-374-61305-1.

=== Memoir ===
- Li, Yiyun (2017). Dear Friend, from My Life I Write to You in Your Life. Random House.
- — (2025). Things in Nature Merely Grow. New York: Farrar, Straus and Giroux. ISBN 978-0-374-61731-8.

=== Short fiction ===
==== Collections ====
- Li, Yiyun (2005). A Thousand Years of Good Prayers. Random House.
- — (2010). Gold Boy, Emerald Girl. Random House.
- — (2023). Wednesday's Child. Farrar, Straus and Giroux.

==== Short stories ====
Title	Publication	Collected in
"Immortality"	The Paris Review (Fall 2003)	A Thousand Years of Good Prayers
"Extra"	The New Yorker (December 22-29, 2003)	A Thousand Years of Good Prayers
"Persimmons"	The Paris Review (Fall 2004)	A Thousand Years of Good Prayers
"The Princess of Nebraska"	Ploughshares (Winter 2004)	A Thousand Years of Good Prayers
"Death Is Not a Bad Joke If Told the Right Way"	Glimmer Train (Spring 2005)	A Thousand Years of Good Prayers
"After a Life"	Prospect (April 2005)	A Thousand Years of Good Prayers
"The Proprietress"	Zoetrope: All-Story 9.3 (Fall 2005)	Gold Boy, Emerald Girl
"Love in the Marketplace"	A Thousand Years of Good Prayers (Fall 2005)	A Thousand Years of Good Prayers
"Son"	A Thousand Years of Good Prayers (Fall 2005)	A Thousand Years of Good Prayers
"The Arrangement"	A Thousand Years of Good Prayers (Fall 2005)	A Thousand Years of Good Prayers
"A Thousand Years of Good Prayers"	A Thousand Years of Good Prayers (Fall 2005)	A Thousand Years of Good Prayers
"Prison"	Tin House 28 (Summer 2006)	Gold Boy, Emerald Girl
"Souvenir"	San Francisco Chronicle (July 9, 2006)	Gold Boy, Emerald Girl
"House Fire"	Granta 97 (Spring 2007)	Gold Boy, Emerald Girl
"Sweeping Past"	The Guardian (August 10, 2007)	Gold Boy, Emerald Girl
"A Man Like Him"	The New Yorker (May 12, 2008)	Gold Boy, Emerald Girl
"Gold Boy, Emerald Girl"	The New Yorker (October 13, 2008)	Gold Boy, Emerald Girl
"Number Three, Garden Road"	Waving at the Gardener: The Asham Award Short-Story Collection (2009)	Gold Boy, Emerald Girl
"Alone"	The New Yorker (November 16, 2009)	Wednesday's Child
"Kindness"	A Public Space 10 (2010)	Gold Boy, Emerald Girl
"The Science of Flight"	The New Yorker (August 30, 2010)	-
"The Reunion"	Washington Post Magazine (November 27, 2011)	-
"A Sheltered Woman"	The New Yorker (March 10, 2014)	Wednesday's Child
"On the Street Where You Live"	The New Yorker (January 9, 2017)	Wednesday's Child
"A Small Flame"	The New Yorker (May 18, 2017)	Wednesday's Child
"Do Not Yet Mother Dear Find Us"*	A Public Space 26 (2018)	* excerpt from Where Reasons End
"A Flawless Silence"	The New Yorker (April 23, 2018)	Wednesday's Child
"When We Were Happy We Had Other Names"	The New Yorker (October 1, 2018)	Wednesday's Child
"All Will Be Well"	The New Yorker (March 11, 2019)	Wednesday's Child
"Let Mothers Doubt"	Esquire UK (July/August 2020)	Wednesday's Child
"Under the Magnolia"	The New York Times Magazine (July 12, 2020)	-
"If You Are Lonely and You Know It"	Amazon Original Stories (February 25, 2021)	-
"Hello, Goodbye"	The New Yorker (November 15, 2021)	Wednesday's Child
"Such Common Life"; 1. Protein; 2. Hypothesis; 3. Contract	Zoetrope: All-Story; 26.2 (Summer 2022); 26.3 (Fall 2022); 26.4 (Winter 2022)	Wednesday's Child
"Wednesday's Child"	The New Yorker (January 23, 2023)	Wednesday's Child
"The Particles of Order"	The New Yorker (September 2, 2024)	-
"Techniques and Idiosyncrasies"	The New Yorker (March 17, 2025)	-
"Any Human Heart"	The New Yorker (June 15, 2025)	-

=== Essays and reporting ===
- Li, Yiyun (December 22–29, 2014). "Listening is believing". Inner Worlds. The New Yorker. Vol. 90, no. 41. p. 88.
- — (January 2, 2017). "To speak is to blunder : choosing to renounce a mother tongue". Personal History. The New Yorker. Vol. 92, no. 43. pp. 30–33.
- Li, Yiyun (October 31, 2024). "The Seventy Percent". Harper's Magazine
- — (March 31, 2025). "The deaths—and lives—of two sons". Personal History. The New Yorker. Vol. 101, no. 6. pp. 38–47. Printed under the title "A matter of facts".
