= American Kickboxer =

1991 film directed by Frans Nel

- Original poster
- Directed by: Frans Nel
- Written by: Emil Kolbe
- Produced by: Anant Singh
- Starring: John Barrett; Keith Vitali; Terry Norton; Brad Morris; Roger Yuan; Ted Le Plat
- Cinematography: Paul Morkel
- Edited by: Renée Engelbrecht
- Music by: Frank Becker
- Production company: Distant Horizon
- Distributed by: Global Pictures (ZA); Cannon Films (US)
- Release dates: 1 March 1991 (ZA); 24 July 1991 (US)
- Running time: 92 minutes
- Countries: South Africa; United States
- Language: English

American Kickboxer (also known as American Kickboxer 1) is a 1991 martial arts film directed by Frans Nel and starring John Barrett, Keith Vitali, and Roger Yuan.

== Plot ==
Robert James "B.J." Quinn is the current middleweight kickboxing champion of the world ready to face his next opponent, Chad Hunter. Hunter proves to be quite the opponent with his impressive skills but in the second round Quinn accidentally hits Chad with an elbow while going for a spinning back fist, causing the doctor to stop the fight. Quinn retains his title.

At a party celebrating a new sponsor, cocky middleweight contender Jacques Denard hits on Quinn's girlfriend Carol. Quinn confronts him and as the two begin to push each other, party-goer Ken tries to split them up. Quinn punches Ken so hard that he crashes through a table and dies. Quinn is sentenced to twelve months on manslaughter charges and is no longer allowed to compete in professional kickboxing. A year later Quinn is released from prison and is shocked to learn that Denard has become the middleweight champion.

Quinn befriends Chad, who ha attempted to help Quinn in his trial with his testimony. Chad asks BJ to help train him for some upcoming fights, including one with Denard for the title. As they begin to train together, BJ starts to get a little jealous when he learns Chad had known Carol and misinterprets it as a possible affair, which proved to be untrue. As BJ amps up his training with Chad, BJ's jealousy from not being able to fight as a pro anymore gets to him and he takes it out on Chad. After a training session results in their alliance splitting, Chad is decimated by Denard in his title opportunity and ends up in the hospital. Meanwhile, sports reporter Willard, who had taunted Quinn at times during his championship run, begins using the same tactics on Denard, annoying him as frequently as possible.

At another party, Denard once again starts to taunt Quinn and berate him. Having had enough, Quinn beats Denard with a chair, prompting Carol to leave Quinn. Quinn moves out of their house and moves to a small house on the beach. Realizing all the mistakes he has made, Quinn decides to quit drinking and begin training for himself again. Chad sees Quinn at the beach and the two renew their friendship as Chad offers Quinn a job at his martial arts school. Meanwhile, humiliated by what happened at the party, Denard challenges Quinn to fight him for $100,000. When Quinn and Carol, whom he also reconciles with, see the headline on the local paper about the fight, he is angry. However, Carol tells him that he can either be alone and angry, or they can work it out together. With the help of Chad and former trainer Howard, who had left Denard's camp after growing tired of his antics, Quinn prepares for the big fight. During a training session with Chad, Quinn finally lets all of his anger out as he has been holding back. Quinn has felt like a loser since his time in prison and can't shake it off. Chad, however, tells him that it will be okay and they need to focus on Denard.

At the fight, Denard's dirty tactics take their toll on Quinn. When Quinn goes down during one of the later rounds, he gets up at a nine-count. He surprises Denard with a flurry of kicks and ends it with a tornado kick, sending Denard to the ground for the ten-count. Chad, Howard, Carol, and others gather to congratulate Quinn. Meanwhile, Willard gets one last jab at Denard before Denard's trainer knocks him out cold in the ring.

== Cast ==
- John Barrett as Robert James "B.J." Quinn
- Keith Vitali as Chad Hunter
- Terry Norton as Carol Quinn
- Brad Morris as Jacques Denard
- Roger Yuan as Howard
- Ted Le Plat as Willard
- Len Sparrowhawk as Bob Wiser
- Gavin Hood as Ken
- Patrick Lyster as Prosecutor
- Larry Martin as Judge Rivers
- Gary Chalmers as Attorney
- Jeff Fannell as Dick
- Alex von Reumont as Jerry
- Tom Agnew as Adrian Holligan Sr.
- Judd Lasarow as Adrian Holligan Jr.
- Zia Garfield as Daley Adams
- Graham Clarke as Alex Bone
- Caroline Smart as Doreen
- Mark Mulder as Eugene
- Deon Stewardson as Jim, Sports Editor

== Production ==
The film was based on a story written by its leader actor John Barrett, an American Tang Soo Do practitioner who worked as a stuntman in several Chuck Norris films. The film was shot in Salt Rock and Durban, South Africa in late 1990, when low budget films were becoming popular to shoot the country for budgetary reasons.

== Release ==
The film was released theatrically in South Africa on March 1, 1991. It never received a theatrical release in the United States, but Cannon Films released the film on home video on July 24, 1991.

In 2022, the streaming service Swissx TV offered NFT ownership of American Kickboxer to commemorate its 30th anniversary.

== Sequels ==
In 1993, two sequels were released. American Kickboxer 2 was a sequel in name only, shot on location in the Philippines and starring former kickboxing champion Dale Cook as a cop forced to team up with his ex-wife's former boyfriend to save his ex-wife's daughter.

A direct sequel entitled To the Death was directed by Darrell Roodt and featured John Barrett as the slightly-renamed "Rick Quinn" and Michel Qissi replacing Brad Morris as Jacques Denard, who starts out as Quinn's rival but ultimately becomes his ally when Quinn is forced to fight in illegal kickboxing fights that end with the loser shot dead after the matches.
