= The Book of Goose =

2022 novel by Yiyun Li

- Author: Yiyun Li
- Language: English
- Genre: Literary fiction
- Set in: France
- Publisher: FSG (US); Picador (UK)
- Publication date: September 20, 2022 (US); August 8, 2022 (UK)
- Publication place: United States; United Kingdom
- Media type: Print
- Pages: 348 pp.
- Awards: PEN/Faulkner Award (2023)
- ISBN: 9780374606343 (hardcover 1st ed.)
- OCLC: 1289234580
- Dewey Decimal: 813/.6
- LC Class: PS3612.I16 B66 2022

The Book of Goose is a 2022 novel written by Yiyun Li. The novel won the PEN/Faulkner Award for Fiction and was longlisted for the Andrew Carnegie Medal for Excellence in Fiction.

== Writing and development ==
Li's initial inspiration for the novel was the discovery of a review of several books about French prodigies, published in the mid-20th century. Li set the novel in France, though she had made only "occasional" trips to the country. French-speaking writer Edmund White, a friend of Li's, read the novel before publication. Li conducted historical research about France after World War II, the period during which portions of the novel takes place. However, Li chose not to center the novel on the facts and information she discovered, as she did not feel the narrator, Agnes, needed to provide the readers overt verisimilitude.

When Li completed the book, Li's editor compared the novel to the Neapolitan Novels by Elena Ferrante.

== Reception ==
=== Critical reception ===
Critics have written about similarities between The Book of Goose and the Neapolitan Novels by Elena Ferrante. Writing for The Atlantic, Sarah Chihaya referred to comparisons between the novel and the series by Ferrante as "too-easy" and "only helpful in orienting the reader toward the themes of desire and self-determination shared by the works." In a review published by the Financial Times, Lucy Scholes asserted that comparisons between "any well-written novel about female friendship" and the Neapolitan Novels were inevitable. Scholes specifically highlighted similarities in the settings of the works and the "dynamic" of the friendships. Megan O'Grady wrote in a review for The New York Times that the comparisons were valid at the outset of the book, but as the novel evolved and the setting changed it instead reminded her of writing by Swiss author Fleur Jaeggy and Scottish writer Muriel Spark.

=== Accolades and honors ===
The novel was longlisted for the Andrew Carnegie Medal for Excellence in Fiction.

It was included on lists of the best novels in 2022 published by The New Yorker, Slate, and Time.
