= To the Death (1993 film) =

- Directed by: Darrell Roodt
- Written by: Greg Latter
- Produced by: Anant Singh
- Starring: John Barrett; Michel Qissi; Robert Whitehead; Michelle Bestbier; Greg Latter
- Cinematography: Mark Vicente
- Edited by: Renee Engelbrecht
- Music by: Frank Becker
- Production company: Distant Horizon
- Distributed by: Cannon Films
- Release date: 13 October 1993 (United States)
- Running time: 95 minutes
- Countries: South Africa; United States
- Language: English

To the Death is a 1993 South African martial arts film directed by Darrell Roodt and starring John Barrett, Michel Qissi, and Robert Whitehead. It is the official sequel to the 1991 film American Kickboxer.

== Plot ==
Professional kickboxing champion Rick Quinn has announced his retirement from the sport. Willard, the one time reporter he could not stand, has now become good friends with him and Quinn plans to live quietly with his pregnant wife Carol. However, one person unhappy with the retirement is Jacques Denard, who has wanted revenge on Quinn from their previous fight. Denard wanted to fight Quinn for the championship and now he finds that chance gone as Quinn has retired. When Denard shows up at Quinn's house to confront him, he is forced to leave at gunpoint by Carol.

Meanwhile, Quinn has attracted the attention of Dominique Le Braque, a rich businessman and lover of fights. As a fight promoter, he stages underground fights in which the loser finds himself shot in the head by the referee after the match is over. When Le Braque attempts to woo Quinn to fight for him, Quinn refuses as he tells him he is done as a professional. To ensure Quinn does join him, Le Braque hires some men to plant a car bomb, killing Carol and their unborn child. The incident destroys Quinn mentally to the point where despite help from Willard, Quinn has turned to alcoholism. He thinks Denard was the one who is responsible for killing Carol and in a drunken rage, confronts him and serves a three-month jail sentence for drunken assault. Le Braque bails Quinn out.

Deciding with nothing left to lose, Quinn takes up Le Braque's offer and is forced to stay at his mansion and land, where he begins to train. He also gets attention from Le Braque's wife Angelica, who slowly begins to tire of her husband's business overshadowing their marriage. When Quinn has his first fight and wins, he learns the horrid truth about what happens to the losers and he demands to leave. However, knowing he has been trapped, Quinn has no choice but to continue winning to keep himself alive. Eventually, he begins an affair with Angelica, which much to Le Braque's chagrin, gives the businessman a good idea. Quinn soon finds he has a familiar face as an opponent, Denard. Quinn attempts to snap some sense into Denard about what happens to the loser. Finally realizing it himself, Denard helps Quinn and together, they begin to take on Le Braque's men. When Le Braque points his gun at Quinn, Angelica shoots Le Braque, killing him.

== Cast ==
- John Barrett as Rick Quinn
- Michel Qissi as Jacques Denard
- Robert Whitehead as Dominique Le Braque
- Michele Bestbier as Angelica Le Braque
- Ted Le Plat as Willard
- Greg Latter as Roger
- Norman Antsey as Tony
- Claudia Udy-Harris as Carol Quinn
- Nick Lorentz as Compere
- Charles Comyn as Bob
- Danny Keogh as Hank
- Len Sparrowhawk as Solly
- Tyrone Stevenson as Legansi
- Leonard Nketsi as Sobah
- Kiki Architto as Trokowsky
- Dudley Du Plessis as Sang Lo & Sayan
- Neville Thomas as Englishman
- Grant Sammons as American Kickboxer
- Lazlo Fagyas as Thai Kickboxer
- Rudi Strydom as Denard's Spar Partner
- Graham Press as The Prince
- Annabella Forbes as Roger's Girlfriend
- Barbora Tellinger as Manageress
- Vanessa Cooke as Whore

== Production ==
The film was shot in South Africa in 1992. The film has been considered an unusual production for director Roodt, who before this film had just earned major credentials after directing the film Sarafina!.

== Release ==
The now defunct Cannon Video released the film on VHS on 13 October 1993.
