= A Thousand Years of Good Prayers =

2007 American drama film by Wayne Wang

- U.S. DVD cover
- Directed by: Wayne Wang
- Written by: Yiyun Li
- Produced by: Yukie Kito; Rich Cowan; Wayne Wang
- Starring: Faye Yu; Henry O Vida Ghahremani; Pasha D. Lychnikoff
- Cinematography: Patrick Lindenmaier
- Edited by: Deirdre Slevin
- Music by: Lesley Barber
- Distributed by: The Match Factory
- Release date: September 9, 2007 (Toronto International Film Festival)
- Running time: 83 minutes
- Country: United States
- Languages: English; Mandarin; Persian

A Thousand Years of Good Prayers is a 2007 American drama film directed by Wayne Wang and starring Faye Yu, Henry O, Vida Ghahremani and Pasha D. Lychnikoff. It is adapted from the short story by Yiyun Li and shot on a high-end high-definition video camera.

It was made as a companion piece to The Princess of Nebraska, a 2007 film also directed by Wayne Wang and adapted from Yiyun Li’s short story.

== Plot ==
The film follows Mr. Shi (Henry O), a retired widower from Beijing. When his only daughter, Yilan (Faye Yu), who lives in Spokane, Washington and works as a librarian, gets divorced, he decides to visit her to help her heal. However Yilan is not interested. She tries keeping an emotional distance but when this finally fails, she begins physically avoiding her father. He confronts her about an affair with a married Russian man (Pasha D. Lychnikoff) and she, in turn, lets loose about all the gossip she'd heard as a young girl about his alleged affair with a female colleague back in China.

Running parallel to this plot is Mr. Shi's park bench meetings with an elderly woman, Madam (Vida Ghahremani). She had fled to the United States from Iran after the revolution. Neither Mr. Shi nor Madam speak English well, but by gesturing and talking in their own tongues, they start a friendship which ends when Madam is put into a retirement home.

Mr. Shi and his daughter Yilan finally come to terms as father and daughter through the greater understanding achieved by their heated confrontations over perceived transgressions that neither one was initially willing to forgive. After Mr. Shi boards a train into the interior of the United States as a tourist, he strikes up a conversation with a woman he meets in one of the cars.

== Background and production ==
Wayne Wang chose to adapt A Thousand Years of Good Prayers into a film because it reminded him of all the Yasujirō Ozu films he so admired when he was a film student. He also has said that he was drawn to the short story by Yiyun Li because of some similarities to his own father.

When Wang first approached Yiyun Li, who had no previous experience, to write the screenplay, he provided her with screenwriting software and "some good scripts." The vague Midwestern setting was changed to Spokane.

Chinese actress and director Faye Yu was the only actor in this film not based in the United States. She first worked with Wang in about 1991 for his The Joy Luck Club when she was 19 and spoke no English. Knowing that she had later studied in America for a few years, Wang gave her a call, decided that her English was fluent enough for the lead role, and persuaded her to hold off her own directorial work in China for a 4-week commitment to his project.

== Reception ==
The film received positive reviews from critics. Kim Voynar of Cinematical described the film as being "meticulously paced and beautifully shot", while Screen International writer Patrick Z. McGavin called it "not earth-shattering or particularly urgent, though it enables a talented filmmaker to work through personal ideas about assimilation and family conflict in an open, smart and gracious way." Todd McCarthy of Variety described the film as "Mainly concerned with generational and cultural issues, very modest entry possesses equally modest commercial potential."

On the review aggregator website Rotten Tomatoes, 79% of 39 critics' reviews are positive. The website's consensus reads: "Though it may not be as profound as its pacing would suggest, A Thousand Years of Good Prayers delicately examines familial issues in an earnest fashion." Metacritic, which uses a weighted average, assigned the film a score of 64 out of 100, based on 15 critics, indicating "generally favorable" reviews.

== Awards and nominations ==
It won the Golden Shell Award for Best Film and also Best Actor Award at the 55th San Sebastián International Film Festival.
