= The Princess of Nebraska =

2007 film by Wayne Wang

- Directed by: Wayne Wang
- Written by: Michael Ray
- Based on: "The Princess of Nebraska" by Yiyun Li
- Produced by: Yukie Kito; Donald Young
- Starring: Li Ling
- Cinematography: Richard Wong
- Edited by: Deirdre Slevin
- Music by: Kent Sparling
- Production companies: Center for Asian American Media; Entertainment Farm
- Distributed by: Magnolia Pictures
- Release dates: September 2, 2007 (Telluride Film Festival); October 17, 2008 (YouTube)
- Running time: 77 minutes
- Country: United States
- Language: English

The Princess of Nebraska is a 2007 drama film directed by Wayne Wang. It stars Li Ling, Pamelyn Chee, and Brian Danforth. The film, adapted from a short story by Yiyun Li, is a companion film to A Thousand Years of Good Prayers. It follows twenty-four hours in the life of Sasha, a Chinese teenage immigrant who is four months pregnant. The Princess of Nebraska was shot on digital video and in San Francisco, making it the first film to be shot by Wang in the area since 1993's The Joy Luck Club.

The film had its world premiere at the Telluride Film Festival on September 2, 2007. The film later premiered on YouTube for free on October 17, 2008.

== Plot ==
Sasha, a teenage girl, has come to the United States from China to study at a university in Omaha, Nebraska. She is four months pregnant through a one-night-stand with Yang, a nándàn back in Beijing. She travels to San Francisco for an abortion and to look for Boshen, a white American gay man who was romantically involved with Yang. Boshen was deported back to the US by the Chinese government for aiding a Western journalist on a story about AIDS. The scandal resulted in Yang being thrown out of his opera troupe and onto the streets of Beijing, where he now makes a living by hustling. Yang has cut off all communications with both Sasha and Boshen.

When Sasha first lands at the Oakland International Airport, her friend does not arrive to pick her up as promised. She takes the BART to downtown San Francisco, where she meets Boshen. Boshen hopes to convince Sasha to keep the baby and start a three-member family in the hopes of baiting Yang to come to America. Meanwhile, Sasha befriends X, a karaoke bar-hostess, and they entertain a group of businessmen in a private karaoke room. Later she spends the night with X. Throughout the film, Sasha is text-messaging Yang, who never responds. She also creates a video diary with her mobile phone which is intercut throughout the narrative.

Although Sasha has come to San Francisco for an abortion, she starts to consider the many different options available to her in America and begins to embrace the concept of "moving on". At her ultrasound appointment, Sasha makes a decision. She leaves the clinic and watches a parade. In the final sequence, in a large empty room, she lip-syncs alone to the song "Hope There's Someone" by Antony and the Johnsons, which begins with the line: "Hope there's someone/Who'll take care of me/When I die, will I go."

== Cast ==
- Li Ling as Sasha
- Pamelyn Chee as X
- Brian Danforth as Boshen
- Patrice Lukulu Binaisa as James
- Minghua Tan as May
- Zhi Hao Li as Driver
- Hiep Thi Le as Mother at mall

== Critical reception ==
In Screen Daily, Patrick Z. McGavin wrote, "If Prayers is about how China's nightmarish past is superimposed over the present, Princess explores the moral and personal consequences of the new go-go market economy and consumer culture on the young and impressionable." McGavin critiqued the story as the weakest part of the film, but wrote Wang "[creates] a series of striking tableaux that visually approximate the emotional fluctuation and volatility of its young female protagonist. Working with the talented cinematographer Richard Wong, Wang works in a more liberated style, favouring off-centre framing and vivid colours to locate the visual equivalent of Sasha's sense of impermanence and dislocation".

Todd McCarthy of Variety felt the film was too slight in narrative and length. He commented "Wang and first-time screenwriter Michael Ray, who is editor of Francis Ford Coppola's literary quarterly 'Zoetrope: All-Story,' seem primarily concerned with aspects of being a modern, post-Tiananmen Square Chinese youth. As the film presents them, these kids have no moorings, no borders, no history, no morals. What's left is fuzzy and undefined, much like this watchable but featherweight portrait."

A.O. Scott of The New York Times gave a positive review in which he observed that "Moments of obviousness are offset by a feeling of gritty lyricism". Though he critiqued the acting in the film, he complimented the film's technical aspects and wrote,

"Mr. Wang employed a wide-aspect ratio, and if you blow the image up to full screen and select the high-quality-video option, you can appreciate the cinematic qualities of his work, which are emphasized by his incorporation of images captured on Sasha's cellphone. Even with a big desktop monitor and a good pair of speakers or earphones, it isn't quite like going to the movies, but the movie itself may benefit from the comparison since it would be easier to skip if you had to buy a ticket."
