= LoveDeath =

2009 Japanese animated science fiction film directed by Ryuhei Kitamura

- Theatrical release poster

Japanese name
- Kanji: ラブデス
- Directed by: Ryuhei Kitamura
- Screenplay by: Isao Kiriyama; Ryuhei Kitamura
- Based on: 69 by Tsutomu Takahashi
- Produced by: Ryuhei Kitamura; Keishiro Shin; Tsutomu Takahashi; Satoshi Takei
- Starring: Shinji Takeda; Nori Sato
- Cinematography: Koji Kanaya
- Edited by: Tomoki Nagasaka
- Music by: Nobuhiko Morino; Daisuke Yano
- Production companies: Suplex; Napalm Films
- Distributed by: DesperaDo; Suplex; WE Productions
- Release dates: February 24, 2006 (Yubari International Fantastic Film Festival); November 26, 2006 (Tokyo International Cine City Festival); May 12, 2007 (Japan)
- Running time: 158 minutes
- Country: Japan
- Language: Japanese

LoveDeath (ラブデス) is a 2006 Japanese action comedy film directed by Ryuhei Kitamura. It is based on the manga 69 by Tsutomu Takahashi.

== Plot ==
Sheela tells Sai that each person has a predetermined Chrysalis Day on which their life's fate will be decided based on how they spend that day. She calculates that his Chrysalis Day is the same as hers and she spends it fleeing from a gang with a large amount of money in a briefcase while he protects her.

== Cast ==
- Shinji Takeda as Sai
- Nori Sato as Sheela
- Eiichiro Funakoshi
- Kohei Otomo
- Susumu Terajima
- Hiroyuki Ikeuchi
- Kanako Fukaura
- Masakatsu Funaki
- Izam
- Shigeru Izumiya
- Yinling of Joytoy
- Kan Kan as Doctor

== Production ==
LoveDeath was Kensuke Sonomura's debut as an action director. LoveDeath was Kitamura's third film adaptation of a manga by Tsutomu Takahashi, after Alive (2002) and Sky High (2003). LoveDeath was Kitamura's first collaboration with Nori Sato, with whom he later also worked on The Midnight Meat Train (2008) and Baton (2009).

== Release ==
LoveDeath premiered at the Yubari International Fantastic Film Festival on February 24, 2006, followed by a showing at the Tokyo International Cine City Festival on November 26, 2006.

The film was released theatrically in Japan on May 12, 2007.

== Reception ==
Reviewer Nikola Gocić of tasteofcinema.com listed the film as #1 on his list of "30 Lesser Known Japanese Cult Films That Are Worth Your Time", writing, "Ryuhei Kitamura ('Versus', 'Aragami', 'Azumi)') entailed in this film all of his perverse notions, including extremely graphic violence, hot girls, Yakuza, and anime/hentai aesthetics. He dipped them in the style of his Tarantino/Rodriguez influences and produced a 159 minute curio that borders on both parody and exploitation."

Reviewer Niels Matthijs of onderhond.com gave the film a rating of 4 out of 5 stars, calling it "hip and flashy" with "seemingly random Japanese weirdness" and writing, "Visually Kitamura is still strong, certainly when there's not too much CGi around to play with. LoveDeath is colorful and vibrant, showcasing all style and no substance camerawork and throwing in some extravagant costumes to liven up the visuals as well as the characters. For a 150 minute film it's good to see that Kitamura is able to keep the level of visual playfulness consistent throughout the whole film." Matthijs concludes, "It's all fluff, all style, no substance and utterly weird, but that's what makes these films so much fun. It's probably Kitamura's best film since Versus and a treat for all that love manga turned real."

Reviewer Jang Gerald of HK Mania wrote, "Indeed, a true comedy above all, this film, lasting 2h30, brings together the craziest adventures, with almost miraculous mastery. [...] Moreover, Kitamura's staging is as stylized as ever, with his famous trademark: a dizzying riot of poses. Each protagonist has the right to the Kitamuresque style, very graphic, which translates into close-ups of grimacing faces, wide shots framed to the nearest millimeter, tracking shots, you name it."

Reviewer BastiTheEnd of animenachrichten.de wrote, "'LoveDeath' is a wild film full of crazy characters and ideas. It does justice to the manga and is a fast-paced road movie lasting 159 minutes. An absolute insider tip."

The website dvdcritiques.com gave the DVD release of the film a rating of 3 out of 5, writing, "It's difficult to describe Love Death, an unpredictable work brimming with energy. Always in motion, this genre-crossing film combines multiple influences: romance, yakuza eiga, thriller, comedy, western. On the menu: love, humor, violence, gore (special mention to the horrendous injury of the fat policeman). [...] It's simple, the whole thing sometimes evokes certain delusions of Takashi Miike. Constantly breaking its tone, the film gives a lot (we cannot blame it for a lack of generosity), so much so that it is somewhat exhausting over its length (153 minutes)." The review concludes, "A hybrid and offbeat work, Love Death once again demonstrates that Ryûhei Kitamura definitely has more than one string to his bow."

When asked in an interview in Otaku USA how LoveDeath fits in with his career path, Kitamura responded, "I think it's the best movie I've ever made. It's so crazy and too extreme. Which is why we're still negotiating for overseas releases. The original is 2 hours and 30 minutes, and we need to make a shorter version for foreign sales, especially in the US. There are some people who only look at the numbers, so my agent asked me to cut it down. I did and it still works. But it took me a while. I didn't make LOVEDEATH for money. If I had it would have been easier to think about the foreign market and the running time before I started shooting. But LOVEDEATH was made from pure desire. I felt like I had to make this movie with my friends in Japan before moving on to the next stage of my career. So I didn't care or worry about anything else. In Japan, they want the DVD release by the end of this year, but I prefer not to release it so it will become legendary. I'm telling my people in Japan, 'In three years, my value is going to go up. So just hide it for now. I'll put it out when I'm in a good mood.' Like I said, that's my strength. Believing in myself."
