= Nobuhiko Morino =

Japanese composer

Nobuhiko Morino (森野宣彦, Morino Nobuhiko) is a Japanese film score composer. Morino frequently collaborates with composer Daisuke Yano and film director Ryuhei Kitamura. Nobuhiko and Kitamura attended the same high school.

== Film scores ==
Year	Titles	Director(s)	Note(s)	Ref.
1997	Down to Hell	Ryuhei Kitamura	Short film Also Long-haired Thug with Knife; Also special effects	
1999	Terror Firmer	Lloyd Kaufman		
2000	Versus	Ryuhei Kitamura		
2002	The Messenger	Ryuhei Kitamura	Short film	
2002	Alive	Ryuhei Kitamura	Co-composed w/ Daisuke Yano	
2003	Aragami	Ryuhei Kitamura		
2003	Sky High	Ryuhei Kitamura		
2004	Longinus	Ryuhei Kitamura	Co-composed w/ Daisuke Yano	
2004	Godzilla: Final Wars	Ryuhei Kitamura	Co-composed w/ Keith Emerson and Daisuke Yano	
2006	LoveDeath	Ryuhei Kitamura	Co-composed w/ Daisuke Yano	
2008	Yoroi Samurai Zombie	Tak Sakaguchi		
2009	Baton	Ryuhei Kitamura		
2011	Yakuza Weapon	Tak Sakaguchi		
2011	Hellgate	John Penney		
2011	Deadball	Yūdai Yamaguchi		
2012	The ABCs of Death	Yūdai Yamaguchi	Segment: J is for Jidai-geki	
2013	It's a Beautiful Day	Kayoko Asakura		
2013	xxxHolic	Keisuke Toyoshima; Jun Tsugita	TV miniseries	
2013	Abductee	Yūdai Yamaguchi		
2016	Max the Movie	Yūdai Yamaguchi	Short film	
2016	Jane's Travels	Yūdai Yamaguchi		
2017	Rokuroku: The Promise of the Witch	Keita Amemiya; Yūdai Yamaguchi		
2017	I Hear the Sun	Daisuke Kamijou		
2022	Bad City	Kensuke Sonomura		
2024	Ghost Killer	Kensuke Sonomura		
