= List of horror films of 2003 =

A list of horror films released in 2003.

Horror films released in 2003
Title	Director	Cast	Country	Notes
Acacia	Park Ki-Yong	Kim Jin-geun, Moon Woo-Bin, Mun Woo-bin	South Korea	
Battlefield Baseball	Yudai Yamaguchi	Tak Sakaguchi, Hideo Sakaki, Atsushi Itō	Japan	Comedy horror
Before I Die	Dave Castiglione, Dawn Murphy, Joel D. Wynkoop	Nancy Feliciano, Gusto Perez, Kevin Bangos	United States	
Beyond Re-Animator	Brian Yuzna	Jeffrey Combs, Bruce Abbott, Jason Barry	Spain; United States	
Blood Sisters	Joe Castro	Phoebe Dollar, David Veach, Darlene Tygrett	United States	
The Bone Snatcher	Jason Wulfsohn	Rachel Shelley, Scott Bairstow, Patrick Lyster	United States; South Africa	
The Bonesetter	Brett Kelly	Kyla Smith, Brett Kelly, Josh Grace	Canada	
China White Serpentine	Eric Stanze, Robin Garrels	D.J. Vivona, Eli DeGeer, Emily Haack	United States	
Creepies	Jeff Leroy	Ron Jeremy, Savvy Brown, Ford Austin	United States	
Darkness Falls	Jonathan Liebesman	Chaney Kley, Emma Caulfield, Lee Cormie	United States	
Dead End	Jean-Baptiste Andrea, Fabrice Canepa	Ray Wise, Alexandra Holden, Lin Shaye	France; United States	
Decoys	Matthew Hastings	Nicole Eggert, Richard Burgi, Kim Poirier	Canada	Horror comedy
Dreamcatcher	Lawrence Kasdan	Morgan Freeman, Thomas Jane, Timothy Olyphant	United States	
Final Destination 2	David R. Ellis	Ali Larter, A.J. Cook, Michael Landes	United States	
Flesh for the Beast	Terry M. West	Ruby Larocca, Sergio Jones, Jane Scarlett	United States	
Freddy vs. Jason	Ronny Yu	Monica Keena, Kelly Rowland, Robert Englund	United States	
GoreGoyles: First Cut		Sébastien Croteau	Canada	
Gory Gory Hallelujah	Sue Corcoran	Tim Gouran, Angie Louise, Jeff Gilbert	United States	Comedy horror
Goth	Brad Sykes	Phoebe Dollar, Laura Reilly, Dave Stann	United States	
Gothika	Mathieu Kassovitz	Halle Berry, Robert Downey Jr., Penélope Cruz	United States	
Gozu	Takashi Miike	Hideki Sone, Show Aikawa, Kimika Yoshino	Japan	
Haute Tension	Alexandre Aja	Cécile De France, Maïwenn Le Besco, Philippe Nahon	France	
House of 1000 Corpses	Rob Zombie	Sid Haig, Sheri Moon Zombie, Bill Moseley	United States	Slasher film
House of the Dead	Uwe Boll	Jonathan Cherry, Tyron Leitso, Clint Howard	United States; Germany; Canada	
Into the Mirror	Kim Sung-ho	Yoo Ji-tae, Kim Myung-min, Kim Hye-na	South Korea	
Jeepers Creepers 2	Victor Salva	Ray Wise, Jonathan Breck, Nicki Aycox	United States	
Ju-On: The Grudge 2	Takashi Shimizu	Noriko Sakai, Chiharu Nîyama, Kei Horie	Japan	
The Last Horror Movie	Julian Richards	Kevin Howarth, Mark Stevenson, Antonia Beamish	United Kingdom	
Leeches!	David DeCoteau	Charity Rahmer, Stephen Sowan, Maya Parrish	United States	
Leprechaun: Back 2 tha Hood	Steven Ayromlooi	Warwick Davis, Tangi Miller, Laz Alonso	United States	
Lethal Dose	Simon De Selva	Katharine Towne, Melanie Brown, Tom Hardy	United Kingdom	
Love Object	Robert Parigi	Desmond Harrington, Melissa Sagemiller, Udo Kier	United States	
Malefic	Steve Sessions	Cynder Moon, Lilith Stabs, Jeff Dylan Graham	United States	
The Manson Family	Jim Van Bebber	Marcelo Games, Marc Pitman, Leslie Orr	United States	
Mimic 3: Sentinel	J.T. Petty	Lance Henriksen, Rebecca Mader, Amanda Plummer	United States	
Monster Man	Michael Davis	Eric Jungmann, Justin Urich, Aimee Brooks	United States	
Moon Child	Takahisa Zeze	Hideto Takarai, Lee-Hom Wang, Tarō Yamamoto	Japan	
Octane	Marcus Adams	Madeleine Stowe, Norman Reedus, Bijou Phillips	United Kingdom	
The Park	Andrew Lau	Bobo Chan, Laila Boonyasak, Kara Hui	Hong Kong	
Puppet Master: The Legacy	Charles Band	Kate Orsini, Jacob Witkin, Jack Donner	United States	
Red Riding Hood	Giacomo Cimini	Roberto Purvis, Kathleen Archebald	Italy	
Red Rover	Marc S. Grenier	William Baldwin, Jodi Lyn O'Keefe, Francis X. McCarthy	United States	
Red Water	Charles Robert Carner	Lou Diamond Phillips, Rob Boltin, Kristy Swanson	United States	
Scarecrow Slayer	David Michael Latt	Tony Todd, Nicole Kingston	United States	
The Seekers	John Bowker	Shannon Barksdale, Rob Merickel, Felicia Pandolfi	United States	
Serial Slayer	Mark Tapio Kines	Melanie Lynskey, Sheeri Rappaport, Mary Lynn Rajskub	United States	
Shark Zone	Danny Lerner	Dean Cochran, Brandi Sherwood, Franklin A. Vallette	Bulgaria; United States	
Speed Demon	David DeCoteau	Nick Doss, Candace Moon, Amber Loy	United States	
Strange Things Happen at Sundown	Marc Fratto	Masha Sapron, Joseph DeVito, Gina Ramsden	United States	
A Tale of Two Sisters	Kim Jee-woon	Im Soo-jung, Moon Geun-young	South Korea	
The Texas Chainsaw Massacre	Marcus Nispel	Jessica Biel, Jonathan Tucker, Erica Leerhsen	United States	
Threshold	Chuck Bowman	Nicholas Lea, Steve Bacic, Brandi Ward	United States	Science fiction horror
The Twins Effect	Dante Lam	Edison Chen, Simon Lui, Josie Ho	Hong Kong	
Undead	Michael Spierig, Peter Spierig	Felicity Mason, Mungo McKay, Rob Jenkins	Australia	
The Undertow	Jeremy Wallace	Julie Farrar, Emily Haack, Doc Brown	United States	
Underworld	Len Wiseman	Kate Beckinsale, Scott Speedman, Michael Sheen	United States	
The Uninvited	Lee Soo-yeon	Park Shin-yang, Jun Ji-hyun, Yoo Sun	South Korea	
Vlad	Michael D. Sellers	Billy Zane, Paul Popowich, Kam Heskin	United States	
Willard	Glen Morgan	Laura Elena Harring, Jackie Burroughs, Crispin Glover	United States	
Wrong Turn	Rob Schmidt	Desmond Harrington, Eliza Dushku, Emmanuelle Chriqui	United States	
