= Death Trance =

- Poster for Death Trance
- Directed by: Yuji Shimomura
- Written by: Seiji Chiba; Shinichi Fujita; Jun'ya Katō; Yuji Shimomura
- Produced by: Yoshinori Chiba; Yoko Hayama; Kana Takeuchi
- Starring: Tak Sakaguchi; Kentaro Seagal; Takamasa Suga
- Cinematography: Shinichi Fujita
- Edited by: Shinichi Fujita; Takafumi Watanabe; Yuji Shimomura
- Music by: Rui Ogawa; Dir En Grey
- Production companies: Media Suits; Fever Dreams
- Distributed by: Tokyo Shock
- Release date: May 20, 2006 (Japan)
- Running time: 90 minutes
- Country: Japan
- Language: Japanese

Death Trance (Japanese: デス・トランス, Hepburn: Desu toransu) is a 2006 Japanese action/fantasy film based on the manga of the same name by Kana Takeuchi. It stars Tak Sakaguchi of Versus fame, alongside Kentaro Seagal (son of actor Steven Seagal) and Takamasa Suga. The film is the directorial debut of Yuji Shimomura, best known for his work as an action director, stuntman, and frequent collaborator of Ryuhei Kitamura. The film's soundtrack features several tracks by the metal band Dir En Grey.

== Plot ==
In an unknown place at an unknown time, a swordsman named Grave (Sakaguchi) yearns for the ultimate battle. Legend tells of a black coffin kept at the Tougan Temple which has the power to grant any man's deepest desire. Hoping to utilize the coffin's ability to fulfill his wish, Grave infiltrates the temple and steals it. Accompanied by a mysterious young girl (Asada), Grave travels across the land towards a desert oasis, a place the tales indicate as being linked to the coffin's power.

Contrary to the popular legend, the Tougan monks believe that the coffin holds the Goddess of Destruction, who was banished from Heaven for trying to destroy the world, and whose release will bring about the apocalypse. Fearing the implications of Grave's actions, the monks dispatch Ryuen (Suga) to retrieve the coffin and prevent it from being opened. But many other forces are also searching for Grave and his prize, including treasure hunter Sid (Seagal), and an all-out free-for-all ensues as they all struggle to discover the secret power of the coffin.

== Cast ==
- Tak Sakaguchi - Grave
- Takamasa Suga - Ryuen
- Kentaro Seagal - Sid
- Yuhki Takeuchi - Yuri
- Ben Hiura - Archbishop
- Honoka Asada - Girl
- Yoko Fujita - Goddess of destruction
- Osamu Takahashi - Master
- Chuck Johnson - Muscleman
- Kei Hasegawa - Capoeira User
- Masumi Shirai - Sword-wielding sister (left)
- Mie Nakao - Sword-wielding sister (right)
- Masaki Inatome - Ninja A / Flying Vampire 01
- Hitoshi Fukushima - Ninja B
- Naohiro Kawamoto - Flying Vampire 02
- Hiroko Yashiki - Fallen Angel
- Kentaro Shimazu - Mountain Bandit A
- Shuhei - Bandit Rene
- Shuya Yoshimoto - Bandit Leo
- Masaki Suzumura - Bandit Gogh
- Bob Suzuki - Bandit Joha
- Daijiro Tsuruoka - Bandit Dali
