= Yakuza Weapon =

- Film poster for Yakuza Weapon

Japanese name
- Kanji: 極道兵器
Transcriptions
- Revised Hepburn: Gokudō Heiki
- Directed by: Tak Sakaguchi; Yūdai Yamaguchi
- Written by: Yūdai Yamaguchi; Tak Sakaguchi
- Based on: Gokudō Heiki by Ken Ishikawa
- Produced by: Yoshinori Chiba; Shuichi Takashino; Toshiki Kimura
- Starring: Tak Sakaguchi; Jun Murakami; Mei Kurokawa; Shingo Tsurumi
- Cinematography: Masakazu Oka
- Edited by: Zensuke Hori
- Music by: Nobuhiko Morino
- Production company: Stairway
- Distributed by: Nikkatsu
- Release dates: February 27, 2011 (Yūbari International Fantastic Film Festival); July 23, 2011 (Japan)
- Running time: 104 minutes
- Country: Japan
- Language: Japanese

Yakuza Weapon (Japanese: 極道兵器, Hepburn: Gokudō Heiki) is a 2011 Japanese film directed and written by Tak Sakaguchi and Yūdai Yamaguchi. Based on the manga by Ken Ishikawa, the film is about Shozo Iwaki (Tak Sakaguchi) who works as a mercenary in South America. Iwaki is informed of the death of his gang boss dad and discovers his former Yakuza henchman is involved in a double-cross. Yakuza Weapon was premiered at the 2011 Yubari International Fantastic Film Festival and opened theatrically in Japan on July 23, 2011.

== Plot ==
Shozo Iwaki (Tak Sakaguchi) is a strong fighter with a strong disregard for his own safety during fights by shrugging off all wounds and damage. He has a falling out with his father, the Boss Yakuza Kenzo Iwaki (Akaji Maro) and spends years in the South American jungle fighting mercenaries. After a battle against opposing soldiers, Shozo is found by a special agent code-named "Red Tiger" and his team of Japanese government agents who inform him of the news that his father was recently assassinated.

Shozo returns home to find his old hideout is now a sleazy loan shark operation run by a former junior lieutenant in the Yakuza, and a rival Yakuza boss, Kurawaki (Shingo Tsurumi) who is double crossing him and trying to unite the other clans under his control. Shozo is then ambushed by his old Yakuza flame, Sister Nayoko (Mei Kurokawa) under the perception that he abandoned her when he left for South America. Upset with this turn of events, Shozo destroys various Kurawaki holdings until he finds that Sister Nayoko is kidnapped by Kurawaki himself. Shozo attacks the Kurawaki high-rise headquarters by blowing it up and rescues Nayoko. Kurawaki escapes in a military helicopter and blows off Shozo's right arm and left leg. Shozo manages to retaliate by shooting down the helicopter with a grenade launcher. Kurawaki survives, but Shozo is severely scarred and dependent on a life-support robotic machine. Kurawaki and his assistant plan to raise an army of mind controlled thugs, which includes Shozo's former sparring partner and blood brother Tetsu (Jun Murakami), who has been driven mad due to the rape and death of his sister at the hands of a rival crime lord.

Shozo is rebuilt by Red Tiger with a M61 Vulcan gatling gun as a prosthetic right arm, and a knee mounted rocket launcher. Nayoko again thinks Shozo's Decision to side with Red Tiger is a foolish and leaves him only to be kidnapped again by Kurawaki. While on a field mission, Red Tiger threatens to control Shozo's actions with a killswitch because he wants Kurawaki brought to him alive for questioning but Shozo blasts it out of his hand. Shozo goes on a raid against Kurawaki's soldiers including mind controlled thugs and machine-gun armed nurses. He faces off against the mind-controlled Tetsu, who attacks him with a gatling gun and rocket launcher weapon made from his sister's body. Finding their weapons to be a stalemate, they resort to a fist fight where Shozo ultimately is victorious and kills Tetsu. Shozo tracks down Kurawaki who has installed a nuclear device in Kenzo's body. Shozo claims that a true Yakuza isn't afraid of nuclear weapons and kills Kurawaki which detonates the nuclear weapon as well.

== Cast ==
- Tak Sakaguchi as Shozo Iwaki, a ex-yakuza who seeks revenge for the murder of his father and the protagonist of the film.
- Akaji Maro as Kenzo Iwaki, a Yakuza boss (leader of Iwaki family) and father of Shozo Iwaki. He is murdered by one of his former subordinates, Kurawaki.
- Shingo Tsurumi as Kurawaki, the main villain of the film. He's a former junior lieutenant in the Iwaki family, currently the boss of his own yakuza group and is the killer of the head of Iwaki family, Kenzo Iwaki.
- Mei Kurokawa as Sister Nayoko, Shozo's yakuza former lover who believes have been abandoned by him when he left for South America.
- Jun Murakami as Tetsu, the former friend of Shozo, and Sumire's older brother.
- Cay Izumi as Sumire, the younger sister of Tetsu.

== Production ==
Director Tak Sakaguchi had only 12 days to shoot the entire film. To make the film on this scale, he decided to bring in his friend and fellow director Yūdai Yamaguchi to also direct the film. Yakuza Weapon is an adaptation of the manga Gokudō Heiki (1996) by Ken Ishikawa. Yamaguchi felt that adapting a manga gave the story a wider appeal than his other film works such as Battlefield Baseball and Deadball. The film is dedicated to Ishikawa who died in 2006.

== Release ==
Yakuza Weapon had its world premiere at the Yūbari International Fantastic Film Festival on February 27, 2011. The film was shown at the New York Asian Film Festival on July 9, 2011, and received its Canadian premiere at the Fantasia Festival on July 16, 2011.

The film received its theatrical release in Japan on July 23, 2011.

Well Go USA acquired the DVD, digital, video-on-demand, and television rights for Yakuza Weapon.

== Reception ==
Fangoria gave Yakuza Weapon a positive review give the film a three out of four rating, while noting that "the tone does flag every so often, and the film could have used a bit of trimming to be made even leaner and meaner" Eye For Film gave the film a three out of five rating, stating that the film is "difficult to maintain that Yakuza Weapon ever adds up to more than the sum of these parts" The Montreal Gazette gave the film a negative review stating it was "mostly just annoying, even, dare I say, boring". The review went on to state that "almost all the dialogue is shouted, with faces scrunched in anger. Yeah, I know it’s supposed to be part of the joke, part of the general the over-the-topness, but it gets old fast." Film Business Asia gave the film a six out of ten rating, finding that the film takes too long to decide whether it's a "spoof yakuza movie or a real action/splatter feast" and that the film only gets on track when Shozo gets his bionic surgery.
