= Stephanie Pearson =

Actress and filmmaker

Stephanie Pearson (born December 16, 1988) is an American actress and filmmaker. She has appeared in the films Kiss Kiss Bang Bang (2005), Insidious: Chapter 2 (2013), Downrange (2017), Recovery (2019) and Psychosynthesis (2020). She has been featured in the television series Ray Donovan (2015), Rizzoli & Isles (2014-2015), and Pam & Tommy (2022).

Alongside acting, Pearson is a director and has directed music videos for artists Wolfmother, and 98º.

== Early life ==
Stephanie Pearson was born in Burbank, California on December 16, 1988, the daughter of Lisa Pearson and director and producer Lee Pearson. She has a younger sister, Leila. She grew up in Laguna Beach, California and spent time at her father's production studio watching the shoots.

Stephanie studied theater at Loyola Marymount University in Los Angeles.

== Film career ==
Pearson began her career as a child actress starring in a dozens of commercials and international ad campaigns during her childhood and teen years. Stephanie caught the eye of director Shane Black and was cast in the 2005 film Kiss Kiss Bang Bang. Soon after, Pearson landed roles in TV shows The Young and the Restless (2009), 'Til Death (2010), Medium (2010), Rizzoli & Isles (2014–2015), Ray Donovan (2015), and Murder in the First (2016).

In 2013, Pearson starred in James Wan's Insidious: Chapter 2, opposite Rose Byrne and Ty Simpkins. This film kicked off Pearson's career as a "scream queen" in the indie film scene. Most notably, in 2017 Pearson starred in Ryuhei Kitamura's Downrange, which premiered at the Toronto International Film Festival as part of their Midnight Madness series and won the Jury Prize for Best Film at Spain's Molins Horror Film Festival. Pearson's "stand out" acting in the film was heralded as "an intense and smart" performance. Subsequent lead roles in horror-thriller films for Pearson included 2019's stunt-heavy Recovery, the 2020 release Psychosynthesis directed by Noam Kroll, distributed by Amazon, and 2022's The Sleep.

In 2022, Pearson appeared opposite Sebastian Stan and Lily James in episode two of Hulu's Pam & Tommy.

== Directing ==
In 2019, Pearson directed the music video for Wolfmother's "Chase The Feeling" featuring Chris Cester from JET, and produced promotional key art for the single. In the spring of 2021, the song and its body of work was nominated for an APRA Music Award for Most Performed Rock Work

Pearson created a "90's nostalgia throwback" music video and EP cover art for boy band 98º and their pop single "Where Do You Wanna Go" in 2021. Billboard was quoted as saying "the summer just heated up with the new video from 98 Degrees for their hot-weather bop...directed by Stephanie Pearson".

== Personal life ==
Since 2017, Pearson has been in a relationship with Australian musician Chris Cester, with whom she lives with in Los Angeles.

== Filmography ==
=== Film ===
| Year | Title | Role | Notes |
|---|---|---|---|
| 2005 | Kiss Kiss Bang Bang | Harmony Faith Lane | |
| 2007 | Boxboarders! | High School Cutie | |
| 2009 | Meanwhile at the Plaza | Chelsea | Short |
| 2013 | Tuolumne | Muse | Short |
| 2013 | Insidious: Chapter 2 | Dark Haired Woman | |
| 2016 | Wolf Mother | Jennie | |
| 2016 | Oasis | Bachelorette | Short |
| 2017 | Kearny St. | Andrea | Short |
| 2017 | Ultimate Ultimate | Dancer | |
| 2017 | The Binding | Olivia | Short |
| 2017 | Freyja | Title Character | Short |
| 2017 | Downrange | Keren | TIFF Official Selection |
| 2017 | Hospice | Sharon | Short |
| 2018 | Bad Tutor | Alexis | |
| 2018 | Momentum | Ruth | |
| 2018 | Land of Distraction | S | Short |
| 2019 | Recovery | Ronnie Price | |
| 2019 | Methadone | Bunny | Outfest Official Selection |
| 2020 | Quarantine with You | Bella | Short film |
| 2020 | The Turn | Tess | 48 Hour Film Fest - West Coast Winner |
| 2020 | Psychosynthesis | Alice | |
| 2020 | Surrender Me | Jennifer Deering | Short |
| 2021 | Night of the Witch | Deputy Darlene | |
| 2022 | The Sleep | Luna | |
| 2022 | Josh Taylor's Prom Date | Martha | |

=== Television ===
| Year | Title | Role | Notes |
|---|---|---|---|
| 1990–2018 | Monica and Friends | Jimmy Five | English dub |
| 2008 | The Riches | Tracy | Episode: "Dead Calm" |
| 2009 | The Young and the Restless | Mia | |
| 2010 | 'Til Death | Missy | Episode: "The Joy of Learning" |
| 2010 | Medium | Julie Pinsley | Episode: "Alison Rolen Got Married" |
| 2014–2015 | Rizzoli & Isles | Danielle Mitchell | Guest star |
| 2015 | Ray Donovan | Domonique | Episode: "Breakfast of Champions" |
| 2016 | Murder in the First | Daisy | Episode: "Sam I Am" |
| 2022 | Pam & Tommy | Jolene | Episode: "I Love You, Tommy" |

=== Directing ===
| Year | Title | Artist | Notes |
|---|---|---|---|
| 2019 | Chase the Feeling | Wolfmother feat. Chris Cester | APRA Music Award nominated work |
| 2021 | Where Do You Wanna Go | 98º | |
