= Tamami =

- Gender: Female
- Language: Japanese

Origin
- Origin: Japanese
- Meaning: Different meanings depending on the kanji used
- Region of origin: Japan

Tamami (written: 珠美 or 珠実) is a feminine Japanese given name. Notable people with the name include:

- Tamami Ono (小野 珠実; born 1989), Japanese figure skater
- Tamami Tanaka (田中 珠美; born 1975), Japanese biathlete
- Tamami Nakada (中田 珠未; born 1997), Japanese professional basketball player

== See also ==
- Tamami: The Baby's Curse, a 2008 film
