= Baton (2009 film) =

2009 Japanese animated science fiction film directed by Ryuhei Kitamura

- DVD cover

Japanese name
- Kanji: バトン
- Directed by: Ryuhei Kitamura
- Written by: Shunji Iwai
- Screenplay by: Isao Kiriyama; Wataru Mimura
- Produced by: Eric S. Calderon; Shunji Iwai
- Starring: Aya Ueto
- Edited by: Shohei Kitajima
- Music by: Nobuhiko Morino
- Production companies: Rockwell Eyes; Tsuburaya Productions
- Release dates: April 28, 2009 (Episode 1); May 31, 2009 (Episode 2); July 11, 2009 (Episode 3)
- Running time: 65 minutes
- Country: Japan
- Language: Japanese

Baton (Japanese: バトン) is a 2009 Japanese animated science fiction film written by Shunji Iwai and directed by Ryuhei Kitamura. It comprises three 20-minute episodes, and was released to commemorate the 150th anniversary of the opening of the port of Yokohama to trade with the West following the 1859 end of the policy of seclusion.

== Plot ==
=== Episode 1: Stowaway ===
Apollo, an android running the Falcon operating system, discovers the disembodied head of the android Saturn and downloads its Cipher operating system, rendering Apollo unable to talk.

=== Episode 2: Apollo and Mikaru ===
Apollo's human companion Mikaru takes him to the doctor, where soldier robot Tomboy agrees to help. Tomboy explains that Cipher was running a legendary operating system that Hades was running when he led the robot uprising fifty years earlier.

=== Episode 3: Cipher ===
Apollo remembers his memories from his earlier incarnations as Cipher, Artemis, and Hades. He tells Tomboy to guard Mikaru, then flies into the sky.

== Cast ==
- Hayato Ichihara as Apollo (voice)
- Aya Ueto as Mikaru (voice)
- Kane Kosugi as Saturn (voice)
- Tatsuya Fujiwara as Cipher (voice)
- Masakatsu Funaki as Hades (voice)
- Izam as Mysterious Man (voice)
- Hiroshi Kamayatsu as Observer (voice)
- Kenji Kohashi as Passenger (voice)
- Shintaro Matsubara as Artemis (voice)
- Takashi Naito as Tomboy (voice)
- Nori Sato as Medusa (voice) (credited as NorA)
- Hiroyuki Watanabe as Robot Guard (voice)
- Miki Yoshimura as Lucy (voice)
- Ren Osugi as Dr. Newton (voice)
- Kazushi Sakuraba as Robot Guard (voice)
- Mimura as Hiroko Yazaki (voice)

== Production ==
The film was produced using rotoscoping. It was Ryuhei Kitamura's first animated film and Shunji Iwai's first experience with rotoscoping. In an interview with alltheanime.com, Iwai explained, "I had written and produced a film called Baton. That was the first time I worked with rotoscoping, but there was no way to do it in Japan, so we had to get a team together in America. We cast very famous Japanese actors in Baton, but the US team didn't know the actors, so they found it hard to reproduce the faces. In a sense, Baton was a kind of test, a preparation for The Case of Hana & Alice." In an interview with Zoom Japan, Iwai explained that Baton "was a very important step in developing the necessary skills to make my own anime. We used rotoscoping for the first time and stumbled on a number of problems, most importantly the fact that the characters' faces were too real and not cute enough. In Baton's case it wasn't a big problem because of the very nature of the story, but when it came to The Case of Hana & Alice I knew we had to do something about it. So working with Kitamura made me realize the problems I would come across later on my own anime film."

The film reunited Kitamura with Aya Ueto, with whom he had previously worked on Azumi. It also reunited Kitamura with Nori Sato, with whom he had previously worked on LoveDeath (2006) and The Midnight Meat Train (2008).

The ending theme is "Tsutaete ~ pass it on" by Tomoko Tane.

== Release ==
Baton was released as three separate episodes exclusively from April 28 to September 27, 2009, for the 150th anniversary of the opening of the port of Yokohama to trade with the West following the 1859 end of the policy of seclusion. Episode 1 was released April 28, 2009, episode 2 was released May 31, 2009, and episode 3 was released July 11, 2009.

== Reception ==
Even before the release of the film, there was discussion of Ryuhei's suitability as a director of an animated film. Todd Brown of ScreenAnarchy wrote, "As frustrating as Versus director Ryuhei Kitamura can be when working in live action (which is very), when you think about it most of his annoying excesses in that format are things generally considered strengths in animation. Hyperactive camera motion? Lots of posturing and over emoting? These are not issues so much in the animated world, and neither are the high levels of production design that Kitamura generally demands but frequently cannot deliver on his tight live action budgets. And so the hopes are high for Baton, Kitamura's first foray into directing animation." Todd of Ain't It Cool News wrote, "BATON is heavy on the rotoscoping and the quality looks a touch uneven, but I'm actually quite excited to see what Kitamura can pull off in the world of animation, a world where most of his directorial excesses will actually play to his advantage."

Following the film's release, reviewer Nikola Gocić of tasteofcinema.com wrote, "Created for the 150th anniversary of the opening of the port at Yokohama, Baton is director Ryūhei Kitamura and writer Shunji Iwai's first foray into the world of animation. Even though it's pretty tame in terms of top anime weirdness, this rotoscoped sci-fi adventure is quite outré and impressive for something that was conceived during the night of drinking. Reminiscent of Laloux's works and Filmation-produced cartoons, it is also a great throwback to the 80s. ... With its light, almost uplifting atmosphere that stems from a simple, yet effective design of milky colors, Baton is far from a typical cyberpunk flick. It can easily be labeled as 'style over substance', but the limited (barely one hour) time-frame is fully utilized to introduce likeable characters and an interesting story."

Criticizing the animation, author mjn of Zhihu Daily wrote, "traditional rotoscoping animation, such as 'Baton' produced by Shunji Iwai in 2009 and 'Flowers of Evil' by Hirofumi Nagahama, cannot avoid one problem: the animation is ugly. When the characters in rotoscoping animation make small movements, the effect of rotoscoping is similar to the vibration of the same tracing, and there are many redundant movements of real people, so the lines feel like they are shaking all the time, and the effect of directly tracing the expressions is definitely very poor. When 'Baton' was rotoscoped by an American animation team, they had a poor recognition of Japanese faces, and the first problem was that the drawings were not like the real people".
