= Deadball =

- Film poster for Deadball
- Directed by: Yudai Yamaguchi
- Written by: Keita Tokaji
- Produced by: Yoshinori Chiba; Shin Torisawa
- Starring: Tak Sakaguchi; Mari Hoshino; Miho Ninagawa; Ryosei Tayama
- Cinematography: Masakazu Oka
- Edited by: Zensuke Hori
- Music by: Nobuhiko Morino
- Production company: Nikkatsu
- Release dates: July 15, 2011 (Fantasia Festival); July 23, 2011 (Japan)
- Running time: 98 minutes
- Country: Japan
- Language: Japanese

Deadball (Japanese: デッドボール, Hepburn: Deddobōru) is a 2011 Japanese splatter comedy film directed by Yudai Yamaguchi. The film stars Tak Sakaguchi as Jubeh Yakyu, a seventeen-year-old who accidentally kills his father with his extra powerful baseball arm. Years later, he is a juvenile delinquent and is sent to a reform school after killing over 50 people within a week. To escape the school, Jubeh agrees to join the baseball team, even though he had sworn off the sport since his father's death.

The film premiered at the Fantasia Festival in 2011. Reception to the film has been more positive than the joint-directoral effort between Yamaguchi and Sakaguchi on their film Yakuza Weapon.

== Plot ==
In modern-day Japan, the young Jubeh Yakyu practices his pitching and catching with his father only to discover that he has super powers by accidentally killing his father with the ball. This is seen by his younger adopted brother, Musashi Nakagawa. Some time later, Jubeh (Tak Sakaguchi), now 17, has become a juvenile delinquent responsible for 50 murders within a week. After being caught for his crime, Jubeh is sent to the Pterodactyl Juvenile Reformatory, run by governor Mifune (Ryosei Tayama), until his trial date. Jubeh shares a cell with the 16-year-old killer Shinosuki Suzuku, (Mari Hoshino) and also comes gets into conflicts with the chief warden Ishihara (Miho Ninagawa), who is the granddaughter of a World War II collaborator in the Nazis' genocide programme. In prison, Jubeh finds out that Musashi was also a prisonmate at one point but died there. Ishihara organises the prison baseball Juvie League and wants Jubeh to take his place in the prison's team, known as the Pterodactyl Gauntlets. Jubeh has not played baseball since the accidental death of his father, but after Ishihara threatens to kill Shinosuki he agrees to play on the condition that the prison food is improved and all the players are pardoned of their crimes. The next day the Pterodactyls take on the St. Black Dahlia High School team, composed of young female psycho-butchers.

== Release ==
Deadball premiered at the Fantasia Festival in Montreal, Quebec, Canada on July 15, 2011. The film received a theatrical release in Japan on July 23, 2011.

Well Go USA acquired the DVD, digital, video-on-demand and television rights for Deadball.

== Reception ==
Fangoria gave the film a rating two out of four and considered it better than Yamaguchi's other directorial effort Yakuza Weapon due to its "increased production value,... occasionally effective gags... and inventive situations". The review went on to state that the film "eventually exhausts with its complete lack of narrative...and nonsensically tacked-on ending". A review in the Montreal Gazette also praised Deadball Yamaguchi's other film, stating that "I liked Deadball (with some reservations) but did not like Yakuza Weapon."

The Japan Times gave the film a three out of five rating. The review compared the film to Yamaguchi's 2003 film Battlefield Baseball stating that "this one will not disappoint" if you were a fan of the previous film. The review went on to note that "though gags that might have once seemed outrageous, now look, through much repetition in the Sushi Typhoon films and elsewhere, familiar, if hardly tame". The review went on to state that in comparison to the other Sushi Typhoon filmmakers, Yamaguchi :gives the audience the occasional wink at the absurdity of the proceedings, in the manner of generations of Japanese dotabata (knock-about) comics." Film Business Asia gave the film a seven out of ten rating praising the film's energy and special effects considering its low budget. The review also noted that it was stronger than Yakuza Weapon, stating that the film "doesn't just rely on gore-fountains and transgressive humour".
