= List of horror films of the 2000s =

Horror films released in the 2000s are listed in the following articles:

- List of horror films of 2000
- List of horror films of 2001
- List of horror films of 2002
- List of horror films of 2003
- List of horror films of 2004
- List of horror films of 2005
- List of horror films of 2006
- List of horror films of 2007
- List of horror films of 2008
- List of horror films of 2009
