= Longinus (film) =

- DVD cover
- Directed by: Ryuhei Kitamura
- Screenplay by: Isao Kiriyama
- Story by: Ryuhei Kitamura; Ryuichi Takatsu; Isao Kiriyama
- Produced by: Tomoko Fujikane; Keishiro Shin; Takahito Obinata
- Starring: Atsushi Sakurai
- Cinematography: Takumi Furuya
- Edited by: Shuichi Kakesu
- Music by: Nobuhiko Morino; Daisuke Yano
- Production company: Napalm Films
- Distributed by: Victor Entertainment, Inc.
- Release date: August 25, 2004
- Running time: 40 minutes
- Country: Japan
- Language: Japanese

Longinus is a 2004 Japanese action horror short film directed by Ryuhei Kitamura.

== Synopsis ==
A war rages on, its end unknown, covering the world in despair. At a military field hospital, a group of soldiers bring in one of their own, wounded by a large, vicious, bite-like wound, along with a large box. The soldiers are visibly shaken. Suddenly, an enigmatic man appears. As he starts to tell them the legend of the Lance of Longinus, their night of unimaginable terror begins.

== Cast ==
- Atsushi Sakurai
- Kanae Uotani
- Yumi Kikuchi
- Minoru Matsumoto
- Taro Kanazawa
- Kazuhito Ohba
- Takehiro Katayama
- Shion Machida
- Hideo Sakaki
- Toshiyuki Kitami

== Songs ==
- Ending theme: “Sacrifice (Last Confused Mix)” by Atsushi Sakurai
