= Be a Man! Samurai School =

- Film poster
- Directed by: Tak Sakaguchi
- Screenplay by: Tak Sakaguchi
- Based on: Sakigake!! Otokojuku by Akira Miyashita
- Produced by: Keiko Kusakabe; Koichi Kusakabe; Toshiki Kimura
- Starring: Tak Sakaguchi; Shōei; Hiroyuki Onoue; Shintaro Yamada; Hideo Sakaki; Akaji Maro; Gō Ayano; Shuya Yoshimoto; Taketari no Yamaguchi; Yoshiaki Yoza; Tetsushi Tanaka; Shun Sugata; Kentarō Shimazu
- Cinematography: Shinichi Fujita
- Edited by: Seiji Harimoto
- Music by: Junichi Soga
- Distributed by: There's Entertainment
- Release date: January 26, 2008 (Japan)
- Running time: 110 minutes
- Country: Japan
- Language: Japanese

Be a Man! Samurai School (Japanese: 魁!!男塾, Hepburn: Sakigake!! Otokojuku; lit Charge!! Men's Cram School) is a Japanese film released in 2008. It was the directorial debut of Tak Sakaguchi, who also wrote and starred in the film. It is based on Akira Miyashita's manga series Sakigake!! Otokojuku. The film's ending theme is "Yaiba" (刃, Blade) by The Back Horn.

Be a Man! Samural School premiered at the Fantasia Festival in 2008, and was subsequently screened at the New York Asian Film Festival in 2009.

== Plot ==
Genji Togashi (Shōei) visits his brother's grave and informs him that he too will be enrolling in Otokojuku. Young Yakuza successor Hidemaro Gokukouji (Hiroyuki Onoue) runs into thugs from Kanto Gogakuren while partying, but is saved by Momotaro Tsurugi (Tak Sakaguchi). As it turns out, Hidemaro's mother (Tomoko Nakajima) already decided to send him to Otokojuku for him to become a man.

At the enrollment ceremony, Hidemaro is assaulted by the head instructor Oni-Hige (Shun Sugata) for not getting into line properly. After he finds Momo and meets Togashi, Oni-Hige introduces the principal, Heihachi Edajima (Akaji Maro). Edajima gives his introductory speech. At orientation, 1st years Tazawa (Taketori no Yamaguchi) and Matsuo (Yoshiaki Yoza) are forced by Tange and the 2nd years to perform ridiculous tasks and manly performances. Togashi and Toramaru stand up to Tange (Masaki Miura), a brawl breaks out and Momo gets involved. The fight is interrupted by 2nd year leader Gouji Akashi (Tetsushi Tanaka), who challenges Momo to a sword fight, which itself gets interrupted by Oni-Hige before a true victor can be decided.

After finding a pair of underwear, drill instructor Iron Helmet (Kentarō Shimazu) summons all the students for a uniform inspection. He informs the students that all real men wear a fundoshi and that the owner of the briefs will be punished. Togashi can see from his face that they belong to Hidemaro, so he confesses to preferring briefs. He is placed in a tub of oil with a candle on a leaf while wearing just a fundoshi. Togashi perseveres as the oil gets hotter, until finally it out, as a message of manliness to Hidemaro. Hidemaro can't take it anymore so he runs away in the middle of the night. After words of encouragement from Shioya (Tatsuo Yamada), the last remaining member of the Gokukouji clan, he returns to Otokojuku just as Momo is being scolded by Oni-Hige for letting him escape. The two of them are placed in twin cells, one of which has a 500 kilogram collapsible ceiling that Momo must hold up by a chain in the other cell in order to keep Hidemaro from being crushed.

One day, Otokojuku is invaded by Kanto Gogakuren, a group of delinquents led by Omito Date (Hideo Sakaki), a former Otokojuku student who was expelled for killing an instructor for forcing him to undergo the twin solitary cells punishment. He and his two right hand men, Hien (Gō Ayano) and Gekko (Shuya Yoshimoto) defeat most of the students. Akashi challenge Date and is nearly killed before being saved by Momo. However, before things can go further, Edajima interrupts and demands they settle things in the 3 Great Astonishing Assaults tournament. Momo, Togashi, and Toramaru are chosen to represent Otokojuku. Togashi again visits his brother's grave, when Oni-Hige suddenly appears. He tells Togashi of how his brother was a real man and gives him his brother's dosu knife. As Momo trains his sword, Toramaru wrestles a bear, and Matsuo practices his ōendan, Hidemaro and Tazawa both wonder what they can do to help.

== Cast ==
- Tak Sakaguchi as Momotaro Tsurugi
- Shōei as Genji Togashi
- Hiroyuki Onoue as Hidemaro Gokukouji
- Shintaro Yamada as Ryuuji Toramaru
- Tetsushi Tanaka as Gouji Akashi
- Akaji Maro as Heihachi Edajima
- Junkichi Orimoto as Shura (monk)
- Hideo Sakaki as Omito Date
- Gō Ayano as Hien
- Shun Sugata as Oni-Hige
