= Alive (2002 film) =

- Theatrical release poster

Japanese name
- Kanji: アライヴ
Transcriptions
- Revised Hepburn: Araivu
- Directed by: Ryuhei Kitamura
- Screenplay by: Ryuhei Kitamura; Yūdai Yamaguchi; Isao Kiriyama
- Based on: Alive by Tsutomu Takahashi
- Produced by: Hidemi Satani; Taizō Fukumaki
- Starring: Hideo Sakaki
- Cinematography: Takumi Furuya
- Edited by: Shuichi Kakesu
- Music by: Nobuhiko Morino; Daisuke Yano
- Production companies: Suplex Inc.; Napalm Films
- Distributed by: The Klock Worx Company; Skyworks
- Release dates: September 7, 2002 (TIFF); June 21, 2003 (Japan)
- Running time: 110 minutes
- Country: Japan
- Language: Japanese

Alive (Japanese: アライヴ, Hepburn: Araivu) is a 2002 Japanese science fiction film directed and co-written by Ryuhei Kitamura. It is based on the manga of the same name by Tsutomu Takahashi and stars Hideo Sakaki, Ryo, Koyuki, Jun Kunimura, and Tak Sakaguchi. In the film, two death row inmates are confined to an isolation cell with an alien organism that surges the violent nature of its host. Alive was theatrically released in Japan on June 21, 2003.

== Cast ==
- Hideo Sakaki as Tenshu Yashiro
- Ryō as Yurika Saegusa
- Koyuki as Asuka Saegusa
- Shun Sugata as Matsuda
- Erika Oda as Misako Hara
- Tak Sakaguchi as Zeros
- Jun Kunimura as Kojima
- Kenji Matsuda as SWAT Leader
- Bengal as Tokutake
- Tetta Sugimoto as Gondoh
- Genji Ishibash as the Warden

== Production ==
=== Crew ===
- Ryuhei Kitamura – director, co-writer
- Keishiro Shin – assistant producer
- Manabu Shinoda – technical producer
- Fumihiko Tamura – lighting director
- Yuji Hayashida – production designer
- Takeshi Shin – visual effects supervisor
- Kenji Shibazaki – sound effects
- Jun Nakamura – mixing engineer
- Yuji Shimomura – action choreographer
- Yūdai Yamaguchi – second unit director

=== Development ===
Technical producer Manabu Shinoda expressed interest in working with director Ryuhei Kitamura after being impressed with Versus. Kitamura proposed an adaptation of the manga Alive to producer Hidemi Satani. However, Satani felt unsure and proposed making a sequel to Versus instead but Kitamura declined, stating: "I didn't want to do something I'd already done". Kitamura chose Alive as his next project in order to prove he could direct non-Zombie films, stating, "Another thing was that I wanted to prove that I wasn't just some guy who could only direct films where Zombies blasted the hell out of each other."

Kitamura was given a bigger budget than what he was given on Versus and chose to spend the budget on set designs. Kitamura instructed production designer Yuji Hayashida to incorporate post-modern elements. Hayashida turned the cell into a solid metal box due to his fascination with metal structures. Hayashida used an open set for the control room to give a sense of freedom, using only pillars, a steel frame, and wires. Due to the outlandish nature of the control room, the filmmakers hired people experienced in building concert stages.

Kitamura didn't want Tenshu to wear prison garb throughout the whole film, feeling it looked "tacky and improbable". Black lab-coats were chosen for the scientists to balance the surreal tone of the isolation cell. Kitamura also wanted the black lab-coats to be more "lustrous". Since the worldview was outlandish, Kitamura wished to only keep the characters grounded in reality. Kitamura had the film's gun effects artist Masazumi Takei train the Special Forces actors in order to look "believable". Kitamura would visit the Special Forces actors during breaks to watch them train. Tak Sakaguchi was cast as Zeros by Kitamura, feeling that Sakaguchi would be able to make the character look "cool." Kitamura wanted to "utilize" Sakaguchi's facial features and went through several designs until the crew achieved the final look. Various versions were rejected for the film's title logo, feeling that some versions resembled the title logo for Alien.

=== Writing ===
Kitamura intentionally did not specify the time frame or setting of the film, wishing for the film to be universal. The film originally began with Tenshu being executed by hanging but Kitamura found the idea "too tacky" and decided on an electric chair instead, feeling that an electric chair was "cooler". Kitamura created the character Zeros specifically for the film in order to have Tenshu battle an equally matched opponent for the film's climax. Kitamura described Zeros as a character that was cloned from the Isomer and human DNA. He also described Zeros as a character who spent his life among machines, being plugged into devices and injected with mysterious chemicals. Earlier drafts had Zeros explode due to Tenshu's psychological waves and was intended to be the film's visual effects showcase, however, Kitamura rewrote it after feeling the scene wasn't going to be "enough" and didn't do Zeros "justice." Kitamura wanted to give Zeros a "Frankenstein-like" quality, to be "pitied" after the Isomer is taken from him. For the film's ending, Kitamura wanted the film to end in a "climactic" way without it being an action scene. In the manga's opening, Tenshu broke down after the faux electrocution, however, Kitamura altered this idea by keeping Tenshu emotionless, stating, "I wanted to hold off showing Tenshu's weakness until later." Gondo's psycho nature was added specifically for the film.

=== Filming ===
The execution scene in the film's opening was filmed near the end of principal photography. A scene was filmed that had Tenshu being led down a giant corridor after the execution scene. The corridor was 150 meters below ground, under construction, and 5 cm, which prevented the crew from bringing enough equipment. As a result, Kitamura was dissatisfied with the way it looked and cut it from the film. The prison hallway scene was filmed on April 27, 2001, on the roof of Yokohama arena. The tunnel at the film's climax was filmed at the Kasukabe Drainage Canal, which was under construction during principal photography. The arrival of the Special Forces was filmed in the parking lot of International Stadium Yokohama. Kitamura also chose to work with kinetic camerawork. Wanting to take a different approach than what he had done on Versus, Kitamura wanted to shoot each scene with one shot. Director of Photography Takumi Furuya was able to utilize "run-and-gun" filming due to storyboards.

The film's ending was shot on the rooftop of the Shinjuku Hijia Building on May 20, 2001. Kitamura admitted that his interest in adapting the manga into a live-action film was due to the ending, stating, "I made this film because I wanted to shoot that final scene on the rooftop. Everything else was geared toward that moment." Kitamura was moved by the manga's ending and intended to "transcend" the original and impress the author. Hitoshi Ozawa was invited for a single day shoot, however, Ozawa warned Kitamura that he was sporting bandages on his head due to a stunt injury. Kitamura invited him over regardless and retained the bandages on-screen. Four hours were spent applying tattoos for Ozawa's character. Sakaki claimed to have lost 10 kilos during filming. Tetta Sugimoto filmed his scenes in 10 days. Sugimoto purposely dyed his hair red and trimmed it to a mohawk for his role. A steel camera device was produced that would be able to fall with Sugimoto after Sakaki would hit him with a custom bottle.

=== Special effects ===
The crew used triple the wire-action than what was used in Versus in order to display Tenshu's supernatural powers. The film contained 300 visual effect shots, 180 of which were not part of the original manga. These 180 effect shots were used in the Versus scene, which took four months, 20 hours a day to track each shot. Action choreographer Yuji Shimomura wanted to film the Versus scene as if it were a martial arts video game, as well as incorporate aerial combat. Shimomura did storyboards for the Versus scene. Shimomura produced a camera test simulation (with Kitamura's approval) with Tak Sakaguchi and Hideo Sakaki's stunt double. Kitamura gave his feedback on how to improve the fight. Kitamura chose to green screen the Versus scene due to insufficient time to do the set ups that the scene required.

Visual effects supervisor Takeshi Shin felt that filming the scene on-set would have restricted the crew due to the amount of wire-action involved and a virtual set allowed them to overcome those limitations. Shin added distortion effects to "show that the Isomer is something that you see and yet can't see." Shin considered using motion-tracking software to better process irregular camera movement, however, the program wasn't able to process some camera movements and it had to be done by hand. Backgrounds with green-screens had to be recreated shot-for-shot to correspond with camera movement. Kitamura wanted the Versus scene to defy the laws of physics, feeling it would have been "lame" for them to simply remain on the ground boxing. Cameras were set up overhead for mid-air shots. Via wire-action, Sakaki and Sakaguchi jumped double the height than what was originally planned, at Kitamura's request. A custom bottle was produced so Sakaki would be able to hit Sugimoto, however, the bottle still managed to cut Sugimoto.

=== Music ===
The music for the Versus scene had to be rewritten repeatedly due to Kitamura's dissatisfaction with previous versions. Composer Nobuhiko Morino felt the Versus scene's music couldn't be downbeat, yet not upbeat like Rock music. Morino also didn't want the Versus scene's music to "destroy the whole tone of the film," but needed to have a "good beat." Composers Morino and Daisuke Yano produced a rough composition prior to syncing it with the scene. The track began as a guitar piece, however, all of the guitars were removed from the first version. Morino admitted to only having a few vague ideas for the Versus scene, which later snowballed into a version that was different to his and Yano's original idea.

== Release ==
=== Theatrical ===
Alive was screened at the Toronto International Film Festival on September 7, 2002, as part of the festival's Midnight Madness programme. The film was theatrically released in Japan on June 21, 2003.

=== Critical response ===
Eddie Cockrell of Variety stated "Kitamura more concerned with lavish production design, super f/x and (gasp!) talk. Item will still live it up at specialty and adventurous mainstream fests, with cult ancillary a given." He also noted that the film lacks the "imaginative, grisly mayhem" that made Kitamura's debut film Versus a "roller-coaster ride" and that the martial arts sequences don't emerge until the 76-minute mark. Andy Patrizio of IGN awarded the film eight out of ten, stating the film "proved just as much fun as Versus" and concluded by saying "Kitamura has proven to be an intelligent director, combining both action and ideas, and his work shows great improvement over Versus."

=== Home media ===
Alive was released on DVD by Tokyo Shock in the United States and Canada on October 26, 2004. This release included the theatrical cut and director's cut, running 118 minutes. The special features included an English dub for the director's cut, a Making of featurette, Cast interviews, original trailers and promos, and an audio commentary by associate producer Keishiro Shin, director Ryuhei Kitamura, cast members Hideo Sakaki, and Tak Sakaguchi, and the author of the original manga, Tsutomu Takahashi. Kitamura noted that the director's cut lingers on the "psychological aspect" of the film, stating, "I wanted to hurt the audience too, but I held back in the theatrical release."
