= Game (2003 film) =

- Directed by: Satoshi Isaka
- Written by: Keigo Higashino (novel); Masaya Ozaki (screenplay)
- Starring: Naohito Fujiki; Yukie Nakama; Ryudo Uzaki; Izam; Ryo Ishibashi
- Release date: 2003
- Running time: 112 minutes
- Country: Japan
- Language: Japanese

Game (stylized G@me) is a 2003 Japanese thriller film, based on a novel by Keigo Higashino. It is directed by Satoshi Isaka, and stars Naohito Fujiki, Yukie Nakama, Ryudo Uzaki, Izam and Ryo Ishibashi. It was remade unofficially in India as Sarabham.

== Plot ==
Advertising executive Shunsuke Sakuma (Naohito Fujiki) is at the top of his game. Winning numerous advertising awards, the cool Shunsuke lives a life most men only dream of. He luckily lands a new massive product campaign for Mikado Beer, Japan's largest conglomerate. Working on the project for almost two years with an estimated three-billion Yen invested, the project would "make" Shunsuke. But in its final stages, the project is suddenly dropped by a single man - Katsutoshi Katsuragi (Ryo Ishibashi), the son of the founder and Vice President of Mikado Beer.

Declared "incompetent" by peers in the world of advertising and replaced by a nobody on the project, Shunsuke gets drunk and drives to Katsuragi's mansion to "tell him off." But instead, he sees a girl climbing out from the house and trails her. The "girl" happens to be Juri Katsuragi (Yukie Nakama), Katsutoshi's daughter by a mistress. Shunsuke approaches Juri, threatening that he would tell her father if she did not come with him. Initially, Shunsuke planned to bring her back to Katsuragi to win his favor, but after thinking things through, he plots a "payback" scheme by kidnapping Juri. Juri, not wanting to stay with her father, goes along with the kidnapping. Scared of the media frenzy that would result if they found out that he had an extramarital affair, Katsutoshi Katsuragi goes along with the kidnapping. . . or does he? In a world of players where everyone is playing a game, who is the one to pull the strings?

== Cast ==
- Naohito Fujiki as Shunsuke Sakuma
- Yukie Nakama as Juri Katsuragi
- Ryo Ishibashi as Katsutoshi Katsuragi
- Ryudo Uzaki
- IZAM

== Soundtrack and theme songs ==
- It's All A Game - Zeebra
