= Tak Sakaguchi =

Japanese actor, director, fight choreographer, stuntman and martial artist (born 1975)

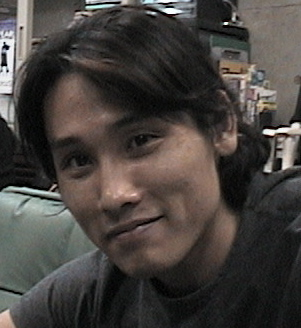
- Sakaguchi in 2001
- Born: March 15, 1975 (age 51); Ishikawa, Japan
- Occupations: Actor, martial artist, YouTuber
- Years active: 2000–present

YouTube information
- Channel: Tak Channel
- Years active: 2019-present
- Genre: Entertainment
- Subscribers: 312 thousand
- Views: 54 million
- Last updated: April 11, 2021
- Website: Tak Official website

Tak Sakaguchi (坂口 拓, Sakaguchi Taku; born March 15, 1975) is a Japanese actor, director, fight choreographer, stuntman and martial artist. He is known for his role in Ryuhei Kitamura's Versus. Since his debut, Sakaguchi has worked with Kitamura several times, often appearing alongside fellow Kitamura staple Hideo Sakaki. He has also worked with frequent Kitamura collaborators Yudai Yamaguchi and Yuji Shimomura. Sakaguchi is a martial artist, and most often appears in films featuring fight scenes, usually performing all of his own stunts. He is reportedly skilled in Bajiquan, Shorinji Kempo, Boxing, Kickboxing, and while recently filming Re:Born learned Zero Range Combat developed by Yoshitaka Inagawa.

== Biography ==
Before entering into the film industry, Sakaguchi was an underground street fighter who was well known for his skill in the martial arts. He was discovered by then-unknown director Ryuhei Kitamura, who recruited Sakaguchi for a lead role in Versus. Since then, Sakaguchi has appeared in several films directed by Kitamura, including the Azumi films, Kitamura's short in the Jam Films titled The Messenger, and minor roles in Aragami and Alive. He played a larger role in the quirky, yet successful Battlefield Baseball (produced by Kitamura and directed by Yudai Yamaguchi).

2006 saw Sakaguchi in more mainstream roles, such as Yashamaru in Shinobi: Heart Under Blade, and "Grave" in Death Trance. He also guest-starred in the Japanese tokusatsu show, Kamen Rider Kabuto, as the villain Reiji Nogi/Cassisworm. In 2008, Sakaguchi made his directorial debut with Sakigake!! Otokojuku (a.k.a. "Samurai School"), in which he also starred, wrote the screenplay, and choreographed the action sequences. He made a cameo appearance in Yoshihiro Nishimura's 2008 exploitation film, Tokyo Gore Police, as well as directed Yoroi: Samurai Zombie, based on a story by Ryuhei Kitamura.

In 2011, Sakaguchi reprised his role as Yakyû Jubei in Deadball, a reimagining of Battlefield Baseball, and also co-directed/starred in Yakuza Weapon, based on the manga Gokudō Heiki. In 2013, Sakaguchi announced his retirement from acting to focus on work behind the camera. Despite this, he is expected to reprise his role as KSC2-303 in Ryuhei Kitamura's Versus 2, and has stated that he is currently working on a sequel to Death Trance.

== Filmography ==
=== Actor ===
- Versus (2000) – Prisoner KSC2-303
- Alive (2002) – Zeros
- Battlefield Baseball (2003) – Yakyū Jubei
- The Messenger (2003, Jam Films segment) – Man
- Aragami (2003) – Future Challenger
- Azumi (2003) – Sanzo Sajiki
- Godzilla: Final Wars (2004 – X-Seijin)
- Azumi 2: Death or Love (2005) – Tsuchigumo
- Shinobi: Heart Under Blade (2005) – Yashamaru
- Cromartie High - The Movie (2005) – Ichiro Yamamoto
- Death Trance (2006) Grave
- Yo-Yo Girl Cop (2006) – Enola Gay gang member
- The Red Army (2007, directed by Kōji Wakamatsu) – Takaya Shiomi
- Sakigake!! Otokojuku (2008) – Momotaro Tsurugi
- Tokyo Gore Police (2008) – (cameo)
- Elite Yankee Saburo The Movie (2009) – Hammerhead Boss
- Mutant Girls Squad (2010) – Kisaragi
- A Yakuza's Daughter Never Cries (2010) – Taku
- Deadball (2011) – Yakyû Jubei
- Yakuza Weapon (2011) - Shozo
- Men's egg Drummers (2011)
- Snot rocket (2012) - Sankichi Tabana
- Why Don't You Play in Hell? (2013) – Sasaki
- Snake of Violence (2013) – Kenji
- Max the Movie (2016) - Sakaguchi
- Re:Born (2017) - Toshiro Kuroda
- Red Blade (2018) - Saizo
- Kingdom (2019) - Saji
- Rise of the Machine Girls (2019) - Matsukata
- Crazy Samurai Musashi (2020) – Miyamoto Musashi
- Osaka girl (2020) - Toshiro Kuroda
- Tokyo dragon hanten (2020)
- Ninja Jaja-maru-kun (2020)
- Koi-no-haka (2020)
- Boryoku Muso (2021)
- Prisoners of the Ghostland (2021)
- 1%er: One-Percenter (2022)
- Bad City (2023) - Han

=== Director ===
- Sakigake!! Otokojuku (2008)
- Yoroi: Samurai Zombie (2008)
- Mutant Girls Squad (First segment) (2010)
- Yakuza Weapon (2011)

=== Writer ===
- Sakigake!! Otokojuku (2008) (screenplay)

=== Fight choreographer ===
- Godzilla: Final Wars (2004)
- Death Trance (2006)
- Akihabara@DEEP (2006)
- Sakigake!! Otokojuku (2008)
- Ai no Mukidashi (2009)
- Yakuza girl (2010)
- Cold fish (2010)
- Himizu (2012)
- Kurocorch (2013)
- Tokyo tribe (2014)
- Torakage (2015)
- Iron grandmother (2015)
- Real Oni gokko (2015)
- HiGH&LOW THE RED RAIN (2016)
- Blue hearts ga kikoeru (2017)
- Tokyo vampire hotel (2017)
- Sekai ha kyo-kara kimi no mono (2017)
- Kodoku meat ball machine (2016)
- Final life (2017)
- Demekin (2017)
- Kuso yaro to Utsukushiki sekai [pianist o utsuna] (2018)
- Iron grandmother 2 (2018)
- Genin akai kage (2019)
- Genin Aoi kage (2019)

=== TV drama ===
- Be-Bop High School Series (2005-2005) – Toshimitsu Yamada (fight director)
- Koi wa jikka ja Umarenai (2005)
- Satomi Hakkenden (2006) - Suketomo Ota
- Kamen Rider Kabuto (2006) – Reiji Nogi/Cassis Worm
- Kagero no tuji (2007)
- Otome no Punch (2008)
- Yukemuri Sniper (2009)
- Crover (2012) - Hiroki Mido
- Bouncer (2017) - Seijiro Torai
- 7nin no hisho (2020) - Kuroda
- Red eyes (2021) - Mayumi

== See also ==
- Hideo Sakaki
