= Downrange (film) =

2017 horror thriller film

- Theatrical release poster
- Directed by: Ryuhei Kitamura
- Written by: Ryuhei Kitamura; Joey O'Bryan
- Produced by: Ryuhei Kitamura; Tarō Maki; Kō Mori
- Starring: Kelly Connaire; Stephanie Pearson; Rod Hernandez
- Cinematography: Matthias Schubert
- Edited by: Shōhei Kitajima
- Music by: Aldo Shllaku
- Production companies: Genco; Eleven Arts
- Distributed by: Shudder
- Release dates: September 10, 2017 (TIFF); April 26, 2018 (United States)
- Running time: 90 minutes
- Countries: United States; Japan
- Language: English

Downrange is a 2017 survival horror film written and directed by Ryuhei Kitamura. It stars Kelly Connaire, Stephanie Pearson and Rod Hernandez. The plot concerns a group of friends on a road trip who all become the target of a distant sniper.

The film premiered at the Toronto International Film Festival on September 10, 2017, and was released via video on demand on April 26, 2018, by Shudder.

== Plot ==
Todd Acosta, his girlfriend Sarah Fletcher, and their new carpooling friends Jodi, Keren, Jeff, and Eric become stranded on a remote country road when their SUV suffers a tire blowout. While changing the tire, Jeff is suddenly killed by a silent sniper fire. The unseen sniper shoots Sarah next, prompting Eric to take cover behind a tree stump while Jodi, Keren, and Todd hide behind the vehicle. The sniper shoots a cellphone off a selfie stick when the trio behind the vehicle tries getting a signal to call 911. Keren uses her hoodie to create a distraction while Todd, who is additionally suffering from a slug lodged in his arm, unsuccessfully attempts to put the SUV in neutral so it can be moved for rolling cover. Eric uses a video shot from his cellphone camera to determine the sniper's position.

Todd retrieves a toolbox and duct tapes its metal lid to his arm for protection. Although he takes another shot in the process, Todd manages to get the SUV rolling on his second attempt. However, the SUV rolls in the opposite direction until the sniper shoots out another tire and disables it. Eric tries running toward nearby trees in the commotion. The sniper shoots Eric in his ankle as well as his leg. Eric hits the ground and eventually passes out.

Keren uses a lighter to heat a hammerhead for cauterizing Todd's arm wound. After retrieving a water bottle from the backseat and taking swigs themselves, the trio tosses the bottle to Eric. The sniper shoots Eric through his hand when he tries taking a sip. During a quiet moment, Todd tells Jodi and Keren that his girlfriend Sarah was pregnant, but lost their baby. Lost in reflection and losing hope, Todd goes to drape a shirt over Sarah's face. Surprisingly, the sniper does not fire. Eric eventually dies from blood loss.

Todd sees a vehicle approaching from the distance. The sniper resumes shooting and kills Todd to prevent him from flagging down the other car. The sniper shoots the female driver's hand. At the wheel, the woman loses control and flips the car, ejecting her daughter in the backseat through a window. The sniper shoots the mother when she tries moving from the wreckage toward her daughter's position. The father drags his wife behind the car. Jodi and Keren scream at the man to call 911, which he does. The sniper shoots the flipped vehicle's gas tank. The resulting explosion kills the man and the woman. The sniper then executes their daughter.

After night falls, Keren and Jodi set fire to their SUV to create a smokescreen. Before the women can make a break for it however, a sheriff arrives at the scene with a deputy and two police marksmen. The sniper takes out one of the sharpshooters as well as the sheriff. The sheriff's truck loses control. Keren makes a run for it in the smoke, but the sniper shoots her through the head.

Jodi regroups at the sheriff's truck with the deputy and remaining marksman, but the sniper shoots the second sharpshooter as well as the deputy. Jodi gets in the truck and speeds toward the sniper's position. Jodi hits the tree where the sniper is perched, knocking him to the ground after he cuts himself free from tangled rope. Jodi recovers the sniper's dropped rifle and uses it to shoot the sniper several times. When the gun jams, Jodi uses the stock end of the rifle to repeatedly bash the sniper to death. However, Jodi notices tally marks on the rifle enumerating his victims, including her five fallen friends, and becomes enraged; in a bleak ending, her final useless strike causes the gun to fire a bullet that tears through her throat, killing her.

== Cast ==
- Kelly Connaire as Jodi
- Stephanie Pearson as Keren
- Rod Hernandez as Todd
- Anthony Kirlew as Eric
- Alexa Yeames as Sara
- Jason Tobias as Jeff
- Aion Boyd as Rifleman
- Eric Matuschek as Father
- Ikumi Yoshimatsu as Mother
- Hana Burson as Daughter
- Chris Powell as Sheriff
- Graham Skipper as Deputy
- Nick Burson as Eager Officer
- Emory Lawrence as Cautious Officer

== Production ==
=== Filming ===
Filming took place in Lebec, California.

== Release ==
=== Theatrical ===
The film was presented as part of the Midnight Madness event at the TIFF on September 10, 2017. "It's my favorite place both as a filmmaker and as a fan," said Mr. Kitamura in an interview with the New York Times. "There's always a high-voltage audience, and I like to watch movies in that atmosphere."
