= Hellgate (2011 film) =

2011 film by John Penney

- Film poster
- Directed by: John Penney
- Written by: John Penney
- Produced by: John Karas; Ryuhei Kitamura; Mark Stuart Lane
- Starring: William Hurt; Cary Elwes
- Cinematography: Sayombhu Mukdeeprom
- Edited by: Edward R. Abroms; Lee Chatametikool
- Music by: Nobuhiko Morino
- Production companies: Capitol Motion Pictures; Angel & Bear Productions
- Distributed by: IFC Films
- Release dates: June 3, 2011 (Italy); November 5, 2011 (US)
- Running time: 93 minutes
- Countries: Thailand; United States
- Language: English

Hellgate (originally titled Shadows) is a 2011 American-Thai supernatural thriller directed and written by John Penney, starring William Hurt and Cary Elwes. Elwes plays the sole survivor of a car crash who, upon seeing ghosts, seeks help from a spiritual guru (Hurt).

== Plot ==
Jeff Mathews, an American businessman, is involved in a car crash in Bangkok, Thailand. When he wakes up in a hospital, his nurse, Choi Luang, informs him that his wife Som and son Kyle have died. Inexplicably, Mathews can feel no grief for his loss. Disturbed by his lack of emotion and apparent hallucinations that plague him, he seeks help from Luang. She brings him to her psychic aunt, who informs him that she believes his soul has been separated from his body. Although she can not help him, she refers him to Warren Mills, an American spiritualist who has experience with reconnecting souls. Mills, who believes the necessary ceremony is too dangerous, is initially reluctant to get involved but eventually agrees to help. Mills explains that Mathews must cross a dangerous passage guarded by demons and maintain his concentration during a critical ceremony in which he will be tempted. However, Mathews abandons the ceremony when he discovers that his family is threatened by the demons. Mills takes over for him, and Mathews crosses over to the afterlife in order to save his family. Mathews successfully leads his family out of danger and reunites with his lost soul.

== Cast ==
- Cary Elwes as Jeff Mathews
- William Hurt as Warren Mills
- Ploy Jindachote as Choi Luang
- Viyada Umarin as Mae Noi
- Weeratham Wichairaksakul as Rangsan Nitava
- Paula Taylor as Som Mathews
- Chanin Goldsmith as Kyle Matthews

== Release ==
Hellgate played at the Italian Fantasy Horror Film Festival on June 3, 2011, and had its United States premiere in Los Angeles on November 5, 2011. IFC Films released the film theatrically and on video on demand on November 16, 2012. It was released on DVD on March 12, 2013.

== Reception ==
Jason Panella of DVD Verdict wrote, "The concept is solid, and Penney deserves credit for approaching a movie like this introspectively, but it comes off as boring and not really that scary." Mark L. Miller of AICN wrote that the film is not particularly scary, but it has "moments of awesome".

=== Awards ===
Hellgate won the Best Film at the Bram Stoker International Film Festival and Best Horror Film at the Fantasy Horror Awards in Italy.
