= Izam =

Japanese musician, tarento, and actor (born 1972)

- Born: Yoshikazu Hine; 23 April 1972 (age 54); Fuchū, Tokyo, Japan
- Genres: Rock
- Occupations: Musician; actor; tarento
- Instrument: Vocals
- Years active: 1993–present
- Spouses: Hinano Yoshikawa (m. 1999; div. 1999) Miho Yoshioka (m. 2006; div. 2026)
- Website: Izam Official Blog Izamania

Izam (stylized as IZAM, born 23 April 1972, in Fuchū, Tokyo) is a Japanese musician, tarento, and actor. His real name is Yoshikazu Hine (日根 良和, Hine Yoshikazu). He is best known as the singer of the visual kei rock band Shazna. He graduated from Tokyo Metropolitan Matsugatani High School. He is represented with Sun Music Production. He is the president of the Benibara Usagi-dan.

== Discography ==
=== Singles ===
Year	Title
1998	"Sunao na mama de"
1998	"Hitomito jite"
2003	"Iris"
2003	"Koishite Kura Kura"

=== Albums ===
Year	Title
2003	Biishiki Kajō
2004	Heavenly Fighter

=== Participation works ===
Year	Title	Artist	Work
1998	Disney Tribute Album We Love Mickey–Happy 70th Anniversary		"Chīsana Sekai"
2011	Loveless, more Loveless	Megamasso	"Sumire September Love (Megamasso feat. Izam)"

== Filmography ==
=== Appearances ===
Year	Title
2000	Chinese Dinner
2001	Oboreru Sakana
2003	g@me.
2006	Eko Eko Azarak R-page
2006	Eko Eko Azarak B-page
2006	LoveDeath
2006	Higake Kinyū Jigoku-den: Komanezumi Tsunejirō: Akutoku Kinyū-shi subeshi
2007	Detective Story
2009	Baton

=== Director ===
Year	Title
2004	Natsuoto -Caonne
2006	Mariko Kuranuki / Cutie Bunny

== Acting works ==
=== TV programmes ===
Year	Title	Network
	Saku Saku Morning Call	tvk
	Tokoro Tekidaso Kukōza	FBS
2007	Shiawasette Nandakke: Kazukazu no Takara-banashi	Fuji TV
	Nipponshi Suspense Gekijō	NTV
	Watashi no Nani ga Ike nai no?	TBS

=== TV dramas ===
Year	Title	Role	Network
1998	Sanshimai Tanteidan	Himself	NTV
2003	Gokinjo Tantei Tomoe	Schumacher	Wowow
	Trick	Tetsuya Kameyama	TV Asahi
2008	Shin Gion Geigi Series: Kyoto Hanayome Ishō Satsujin Jiken	Yuichiro Yoshimoto	Fuji TV
2010	Keishichō Minamidaira Han: Shichinin no Keiji	Shinji Inaba	TBS
2012	Gaisenshi: Kitashirakawa Akiko no Jiken Uranai	Tsuruo Takahara	TV Tokyo
2012	Yonaoshi Kōmuin The Kōshōjin	Takeo Fujino	TBS
2013	Kamen Rider Wizard	Conductor / Beelzebub	TV Asahi
2014	Tsuri Keiji	Yugo Sawamura	TBS
2015	San-biki no Ossan 2: Seigi no Mikata, futatabi!!	Layer (Jiro Yamamuro)	TV Tokyo
2015	Shihō Kyōkan Yoshiko Hotaka	Toru Nakagawa	TV Asahi

=== Direct-to-video ===
Year	Title	Role
2005	Pretty Guardian Sailor Moon "Act.Zero / The Birth of Sailor V"	Magic thief (Cutie Kenko)
2017	Cougar no Shiro –Joshi Keimusho– 2	Administrator, Measures Department Ando

=== Advertisements ===
Title
Dainihon Jochugiku Company "Dance ni Gon"
Japan Tobacco "Awadatsu Cafe Au Lait Awadatsu Cafe Chocolate"
Bourbon "Churoful", "Waffle Bar"

=== Stage ===
Year	Title	Role
2010	Sekai o Owari ni Chikazukeru Ai no Mahō	
2010	Cabaret Quartier Latin! 1950	
2011	Wrestler Boys	
2011	Inyōshi –Light and Shadow–	Notomomori Taira
2013	+Gold Fish	
2014	Ma horoba kanata –Chōshū Shishi no Mezashita Basho–	

=== Films ===
Year	Title	Role	Ref.
2006	LoveDeath	Gamou	
2016	Minbo	Hideki Murasaki	
2017	Cougar no Shiro –Joshi Keimusho–	Administrator, Measures Department Ando	

== Voice acting ==
=== Anime films ===
Year	Title	Role
1998	Crayon Shin-chan: Blitzkrieg! Pig's Hoof's Secret Mission	Izam
