= Re:Born (film) =

- Directed by: Yuji Shimomura
- Screenplay by: Benio Saeki; Tak Sakaguchi
- Produced by: Shinichi Fujita; Midori Inoue
- Starring: Tak Sakaguchi: Mariko Shinoda; Akio Ōtsuka
- Cinematography: Tetsuya Kudô
- Edited by: Shinichi Fujita; Yûji Shimomura
- Music by: Kenji Kawai
- Production companies: Worsal Co., Ltd.; U'Den Flameworks
- Release date: 25 July 2016 (BIFAN)
- Running time: 100 minutes
- Country: Japan

Re:Born is a 2016 Japanese action film directed by Yûji Shimomura and produced by Shinichi Fujita and Midori Inoue. The film stars Tak Sakaguchi, alongside Mariko Shinoda and Akio Ōtsuka.

== Premise ==
Toshiro Kuroda, a former black-ops soldier, lives a peaceful life in a small town with his adopted niece Sachi, but things take a drastic turn when Toshiro's past rival Phantom dispatches a team of assassins to finish Toshiro. When Sachi gets kidnapped by Phantom, Toshiro must use his deadly skills to protect Sachi and confront his past demons.

== Cast ==
- Tak Sakaguchi as Toshiro Kuroda aka GHOST
- Yura Kondo as Sachi
- Takumi Saitoh as Kenji Makabe
- Hitomi Hasebe as Shizuka Matsumoto
- Mariko Shinoda as Newt
- Masanori Mimoto as Fox
- Hiroko Yashiki as Eagle
- Makoto Sakaguchi as Casper
- Orson Mochizuki as Max
- Kenta as Masaru
- Akio Otsuka as Phantom
- Issei Ishida as Lock
- Saori Izawa as Office Lady Killer
- Masaya Kato as Defence Force Commander
- Yoshitaka Inagawa as Abyss Walker

== Release ==
Re:Born had its world premiere at the 2016 Bucheon International Fantastic Film Festival. The film had its North American premiere at Fantastic Fest in 2016 and was released in Japan on August 12, 2017.

== Reception ==
Mark Schilling of The Japan Times stated that Sakaguchi is "still a convincingly lethal presence", while noting that the film's plot was similar to a video game wherein the protagonist faces a series of bosses, and that attempts by scriptwriter Benio Saeki to expand on that premise felt forced.
