= No One Lives =

- Theatrical release poster
- Directed by: Ryuhei Kitamura
- Written by: David Cohen
- Produced by: Harry Knapp; Kami Naghdi
- Starring: Luke Evans; Adelaide Clemens; Lee Tergesen; Laura Ramsey; Derek Magyar; Beau Knapp; America Olivo; Brodus Clay; Lindsey Shaw
- Cinematography: Daniel Pearl
- Edited by: Toby Yates
- Music by: Jerome Dillon
- Production company: WWE Studios
- Distributed by: Anchor Bay Films
- Release dates: September 8, 2012 (Toronto International Film Festival); May 10, 2013 (United States)
- Running time: 86 minutes
- Country: United States
- Language: English
- Budget: $5 million
- Box office: $1,048,704

No One Lives is a 2012 American action horror film directed by Ryuhei Kitamura. It stars Luke Evans and Adelaide Clemens. The film premiered at the 2011 Toronto International Film Festival on September 8, 2012, and had a limited release on May 10, 2013.

== Plot ==
While traveling cross country, a couple (Betty and a man referred to as "Driver") encounter a gang of robbers. The group, led by dedicated criminal Hoag, consists of Hoag's brother Ethan, his daughter Amber, his girlfriend Tamara, Amber's boyfriend Denny, and the violent Flynn.

Believing the couple to be wealthy and wanting to make up for a botched robbery, Flynn kidnaps them and has Ethan interrogate them. However, Betty commits suicide, which leads to Driver breaking out of his handcuffs and killing Ethan.

Upon bringing the Driver's car to the group's hideout, Flynn finds a girl in the trunk. Amber realizes the girl is Emma Ward, a wealthy heiress who disappeared after 14 of her friends were murdered at a party, and Driver is the one responsible for the massacre. Following Hoag's orders, Denny and Tamara head to the gas station to contact Ethan, only to find his and Betty's bodies. Carrying Ethan's corpse back to their hideout, they inadvertently bring along Driver, who has hidden himself inside the cadaver.

The Driver begins his assault by capturing Hoag, while Denny is injured by booby traps the Driver has set up around the house. The Driver tortures Hoag, cuts off his ear as a trophy and kills him with a meat grinder. As Driver destroyed the group's van, a bleeding Denny fixes up their old Jeep. Although he succeeds, the Driver shoves him into the open car engine, badly mangling his face. As he pursues Amber, the rest flee in the Jeep. Driver impales Amber with a thrown scythe and leaves her to die. Amber stumbles onto the road, where Flynn accidentally runs her over.

Dropping Denny off at the hospital, Flynn, Tamara, and Emma stay at a motel. When Flynn uses the Driver's credit card to pay, motel owner Harris calls the police, as Driver had used the card to check himself in earlier. Driver arrives at the motel and nearly strangles Tamara to death in the shower but stops when he hears Flynn shoot the sheriff responding to Harris' call. Tamara startles Flynn, who accidentally kills her, and Emma attempts to escape. Chasing after her, Flynn is hit by Driver in the sheriff's car. Emma flees into a nearby junkyard.

A three-way confrontation between Flynn, Driver and Emma ends with Flynn incapacitated and Emma holding Driver at gunpoint. Emma, resolved to kill Driver herself, fails to operate the shotgun. Impressed, the Driver removes the tracking device inside her stomach and frees her. He then kills Flynn and also Harris for knowing his real name.

The next day, Driver, disguised as a doctor, murders Denny in his hospital bed. As he leaves, he spots Emma being wheeled into the hospital. He touches her arm before departing.

== Cast ==
- Luke Evans as Driver
- Adelaide Clemens as Emma Ward
- Lee Tergesen as Hoag
- Derek Magyar as Flynn
- America Olivo as Tamara
- Beau Knapp as Denny
- Lindsey Shaw as Amber
- Brodus Clay as Ethan
- Laura Ramsey as Betty
- Gary Grubbs as Harris

Andrea Frankle, Rob Steinberg, Jake Austin Walker, and Dalton E. Gray portray the family killed by Flynn. The sheriff is played by Carl Palmer.

== Production ==
In May 2011, it was reported Pathé would partner with WWE Studios to co-produce No One Lives, a horror film starring Luke Evans to be directed by Ryuhei Kitamura.

== Release ==
Following the film's Toronto premiere, Anchor Bay Films picked up distribution rights to release the film theatrically in North America, the U.K, and Australia and to handle the home video release across various platforms. The film is Rated R for strong bloody violence, disturbing images, pervasive language, and some sexuality/nudity. On April 13, 2013, a red band trailer for the film was released. In the United States, the film was released in select cities (New York, Los Angeles, Chicago, San Francisco, Dallas, Philadelphia, Miami, Boston, Detroit, Houston and Baltimore).

== Reception ==
=== Critical response ===
Review aggregation website Rotten Tomatoes holds a 43% approval rating based on 37 reviews with an average score of 4.9/10. The film premiered at the 2012 Toronto International Film Festival on September 8, 2012 and received mixed early reviews. Reviewer William Brownridge wrote, "Completely pointless and full of strange dialogue, No One Lives still manages to be one of the most entertaining films around. This is a film that is best enjoyed among a crowd of genre fans. Extremely violent and bloody, audiences will cheer as Driver eliminates the gang one after another. The title isn’t just a suggestion, it’s a rule, and watching the madness that explodes from the screen is sure to please crowds looking for non-stop action and bloody violence." The Toronto Star said, "While parts of it are deliberately campy, the low-budget production veers onto the amateurish and some of the jump cuts make it look like it was edited with a switchblade. Or make that a butter knife." A reviewer from Shocktillyoudrop.com wrote, "Even if it’s nothing to write home about, at 78 minutes sans credits and with plenty of over-the-top carnage that will have you squirming, this is mindless entertainment done right. It gets the job done quickly and effectively before calling it a day. Sometimes that’s all one can ask for", and it gives the shock score a 6.

=== Box office ===
No One Lives opened on May 10, 2013 in 53 theatres and in its opening weekend grossed $47,800, for an average of $1902 per theatre. As of May 19, 2013, the film had grossed $1,048,704. The budget for the film was an estimated $1,000,000. It performed better than some other WWE Studios' limited releases, such as The Day, Legendary, The Reunion and The Chaperone.

== Home media ==
The film was released on DVD/Blu-ray on April 20, 2013.
