= Tamami: The Baby's Curse =

- Film poster
- Directed by: Yūdai Yamaguchi
- Written by: Hirotoshi Kobayashi
- Produced by: Shin Torisawa
- Starring: Atsuko Asano; Etsuko Ikuta; Goro Noguchi; Itsuji Itao; Keisuke Horibe
- Cinematography: Masakazu Oka
- Edited by: Tsuyoshi Imai
- Music by: Tomohide Harada; Takashi Nakagawa
- Release date: August 2, 2008 (Japan)
- Running time: 104 minutes
- Country: Japan
- Language: Japanese

Tamami: The Baby's Curse (Japanese: 赤んぼ少女, Hepburn: Akanbo Shojo) is a 2008 Japanese horror movie based on a Kazuo Umezu manga directed by Yūdai Yamaguchi.

The original manga and previously been an inspiration for the 1968 film The Snake Girl and the Silver-Haired Witch.

== Cast ==
- Atsuko Asano as Yuko Nanjo
- Etsuko Ikuta as Sue Kii
- Goro Noguchi as Keizo Nanjo
- Itsuji Itao as Driver
- Keisuke Horibe as Seiya Yoshimura
- Nako Mizusawa as Yōko Nanjo
- Takumi Saitoh as Takaya Yoshimura
- Asami
- Teru
