= Aragami (film) =

- DVD cover

Japanese name
- Kanji: 荒神
Transcriptions
- Revised Hepburn: Kōjin
- Directed by: Ryuhei Kitamura
- Written by: Ryuhei Kitamura; Ryuichi Takatsu
- Produced by: Shinya Kawai
- Starring: Takao Osawa; Masaya Kato; Kanae Uotani; Tak Sakaguchi; Hideo Sakaki
- Cinematography: Takumi Furuya
- Edited by: Shuichi Kakesu
- Music by: Nobuhiko Morino
- Distributed by: Micott Inc.
- Release date: 27 March 2003 (Japan)
- Running time: 78 minutes
- Country: Japan
- Language: Japanese

Aragami (Japanese: 荒神), also known as Aragami: The Raging God of Battle, is a 2003 Japanese action film directed by Ryuhei Kitamura. It was Kitamura's contribution to the Duel Project, a challenge issued by producer Shinya Kawai to him and fellow director Yukihiko Tsutsumi to film a feature-length movie with only two actors, battling in one setting, in only the time frame of one week.

== Plot ==
Two seriously wounded samurai find refuge from a storm at an isolated temple, the home of a swordsman and a mysterious young woman.

One samurai awakes to find that not only has his comrade died, but that his wounds have miraculously healed. He discovers that he has been given the power of immortality by the swordsman, a man once known as the legendary Miyamoto Musashi, who now lives an endless existence as Aragami, a "god of battle".

== Production ==
The film was shot between May 29, 2002, and June 7, 2002.

== See also ==
- 2LDK – Yukihiki Tsutsumi's Duel Project film.
