= Yubari International Fantastic Film Festival =

Film festival in Japan

- Location: Yūbari, Hokkaidō
- Founded: 1990
- Festival date: Opening: 28 July 2022; Closing: 1 August 2022
- Language: International
- Website: Yubari

Current: 32nd Yubari International Fantastic Film Festival
- 33rd 31st

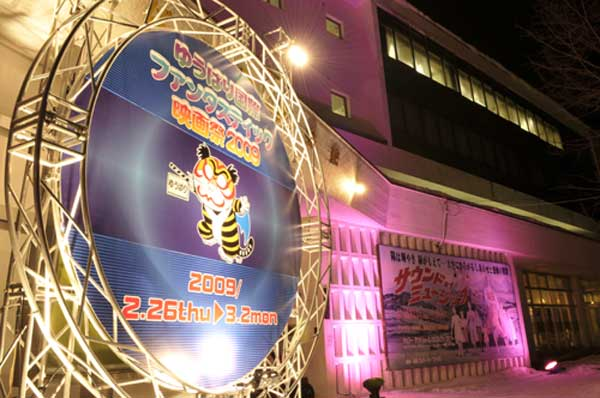
Yubari City hall.

The Yubari International Fantastic Film Festival (ゆうばり国際ファンタスティック映画祭, Yūbari kokusai fantasutikku eiga sai), also sometimes called YIFFF, is held in a resort-like environment in the small town of Yūbari on the northernmost Japanese island of Hokkaidō. From 1990 to 1999, the festival was known as the Yubari International Fantastic Adventure Film Festival.

== History ==
In 1990, the last coal mine in the Hokkaidō mining town of Yūbari having closed, the city leaders were looking for a way to revitalize the local economy. This was the beginning of the Yubari International Fantastic Film Festival. The festival was divided into two main programs, a prestigious international competition for young directors, and an Off Theatre program for mostly Japanese amateur, independent and first-time directors. The first year in 1990 had as a special guest, actor Jon Voight and his daughter, a young starlet named Angelina Jolie. In 1993, Quentin Tarantino was at the festival and wrote part of the screenplay for Pulp Fiction in his hotel room. Some years later, he paid homage to the town in the name of a character in Kill Bill: Volume 1, "Gogo Yubari". In 1996 the festival also had special guest stars, comedians Steve Martin and Martin Short. In 2004 the festival drew a record audience of 27,000.

The festival had always been financially sponsored by the city of Yubari, but the town filed for bankruptcy in 2007, leading to the cancellation of that year's festival. However, the people of Yubari, with the assistance of several sponsors, were able to come together to revive the festival in 2008. Although the international competition section of the festival had to be dropped, the Off Theatre program for young Japanese directors was retained, with the Grand Prize offering 2 million yen (approximately $20,000) to the winner. The new Governor's Award was presented by the Governor of Hokkaidō. In addition to the competition section, the festival continued to screen a number of international films by promising directors. One of the sponsors for the festival is the giant Japanese satellite broadcasting company SKYPerfecTV! which has also broadcast parts of the program. The scaled down 2008 festival drew more than 8,800 fans and attendance increased to over 10,500 in 2009.

The 32nd edition of the Yubari International Fantastic Film Festival will be held from July 28 to August 1 2022.

A new scholarship system will be established in 2023 (unilaterally "abolished" on the official website on November 22, 2024).

In 2024, Yubari Fanta, the NPO that had been in charge of the operation, announced that it would suspend its activities due to the issue of unpaid prize money from before 2023 coming to light, and the Yubari Volunteer Association said that Kei Nakata would be the representative. hosts a film festival. The event will be held at two geographically separated venues: Hostel Himawari in Yubari City and Hotel Paradise Hills in Kuriyama Onsen, Kuriyama Town. Yubari City Hall has decided not to accept requests for sponsorship (nominal sponsorship) for the Yubari International Fantastic Film Festival, and has notified the organizers of the event, failing to provide an overall picture of the project and unclear who is the representative of the organization, including past achievements and responsibilities. It did not meet the city's standards in terms of structure and other aspects.

Many problems arose during the session. Film producer Maki Tsuchida, who was one of the final judges, died suddenly at the Kuriyama Onsen Hotel Paradise Hills in the early hours of December 25th, and the fact is being kept secret. Subtitles will not be added to foreign films. Trouble arises regarding accommodation expense assistance, non-payment of illustration orders, etc. In addition, sloppy financial management and operations were revealed.

== Major awards ==
Award information from:

=== 1990 Awards ===
Held February 14–18, 1990.

- Grand Prize

Ofelas – Director: Nils Gaup

- Special Prize

Spirits of the Air, Gremlins of the Clouds – Director: Alex Proyas

OFF THEATRE COMPETITION

- Grand Prize

Takeshita Performance Higei Mito-Komon – Director: Sinya Takesita

- Special Prize

Gig – Director: Kosuke Ienaga

- Toroma Prize

Meilin Adventure – Director: Satoshi Imai

=== 1991 Awards ===
Held February 15–19, 1991.

- Grand Prize

The Miracle in Valby (Miraklet i Valby) – Director: Åke Sandgren

- Special Jury Prize

Windwalker – Director: Kieth Merrill

- Critic's Award

Miller's Crossing – Director: Joel Coen

OFF THEATRE COMPETITION

- Grand Prize

Death Express – Director: Hiroyuki Terada

- Jury Prize

Rice Game – Director: Hideaki Kobayashi

=== 1992 Awards ===
Held February 14–18, 1992.

- Grand Prize

The Swordsman in Double Flag Town – Director: He Ping

- Special Jury Prize

A Demon in My View – Director: Petra Haffter

- Critic's Award

Tetsuo II: Body Hammer – Director: Shinya Tsukamoto

OFF THEATRE COMPETITION

- Grand Prize

Diamonds Moon – Director: Akira Nobi

- Jury Prize

Kappas – Director: Katsuya Ohsawa

=== 1993 Awards ===
Held February 19–23, 1993.

- Grand Prize

Children of Nature – Director: Fridrik Thor Fridriksson

- Special Jury Prize

Winds of God – Director: Yoko Narahashi

- Critic's Award

Reservoir Dogs – Director: Quentin Tarantino

- Citizen's Award

Ninja Scroll – Director: Yoshiaki Kawajiri

OFF THEATRE COMPETITION

- Grand Prize

Trash – Director: Naoki Kubo

- Jury Prize

My Daddy Long Legs – Director: Shin Yasuhara

=== 1994 Awards ===
Held February 18–22, 1994.

- Grand Prize

Killing Zoe – Director: Roger Roberts Avary

- Special Jury Prize

C'est arrive pres de chez vous – Director: Rémy Belvaux & André Bonzel

- Minami Toshiko Award / Critic's Award

Carne – Director: Gaspar Noé

- The Most Entertaining Award

El Mariachi – Director: Robert Rodriguez

OFF THEATRE COMPETITION

- Grand Prize

Family Time – Director: Ryota Kawaguchi

- Jury Prize

My Favorite "Skyline" – Director: Shin Yasuhara
Vending Machine and a Girl – Director: Kiyohide Otani

=== 1995 Awards ===
Held February 17–21, 1995.

- Grand Prize

Tombés du ciel – Director: Philippe Lioret

- Special Jury Prize

The Secret Adventures of Tom Thumb – Director: Dave Borthwick

- Minami Toshiko Award

Wizard of Darkness – Director: Shimako Sato

OFF THEATRE COMPETITION

- Grand Prize

The Incredible Haniwa Man – Director: Shin Yasuhara

- Jury Prize

Anatomia Extinction – Director: Yoshihiro Nishimura
A Room Without Wind – Director: Ryuta Miyake

=== 1996 Awards ===
Held February 18–20, 1996.

- Grand Prize

Accumulator 1 – Director: Jan Svěrák

- Special Jury Prize

Manneken Pis – Director: Frank Van Passel

- Minami Toshiko Award

Secret Waltz – Director: Akira Nobi

OFF THEATRE COMPETITION

- Grand Prize

Brain Holiday – Director: Hineki Mito

- Jury Prize

Blood Red Girls – Director: Daisuke Yamanouchi

- Encouragement Prize

Rest Room – Director: Muneyoshi Murakami
To Be or Not to Be – Director: Tomoko Matsunashi

=== 1997 Awards ===
Held February 14–18, 1997.

- Grand Prize

Closing Time – Director: Masahiro Kobayashi

- Special Jury Prize

Little Sister – Director: Robert Jan Westdijk

- Minami Toshiko Award

Drive – Director: Steve Wang

OFF THEATRE COMPETITION

- Grand Prize

Party – Director: Mayumi Uchiumi

- Jury Prize

L&D – Director: Hideki Kimura

=== 1998 Awards ===
Held February 13–17, 1998.

- Grand Prize

Bernie – Director: Albert Dupontel

- Jean-Hugues Anglade Award

Detective Riko – Director: Satoshi Isaka

- Adventure Film Prize

The Ground – Director: Atsushi Muroga

- Minami Toshiko Award

Illtown – Director: Nick Gomez

OFF THEATRE COMPETITION

- Grand Prize

Midnight Three – Director: Yasushi Koshizaka

- Special Jury Prize

Variation for Movements – Director: Yoshinao Sato

- Encouragement Prize

Kurushime Girl – Director: Noboru Iguchi

=== 1999 Awards ===
Held February 19–23, 1999.

- Grand Prize

Bandits – Director: Katja von Garnier

- Special Jury Prize / Minami Toshiko Award

Moonlight Whispers – Director: Akihiko Shiota

OFF THEATRE COMPETITION

- Grand Prize

Tel-Club – Director: Kenji Murakami

- Special Jury Prize

Kiadoryoku REAL – Director: Katsushi Boda

=== 2000 Awards ===
Held February 18–22, 2000.

- Grand Prize

Across a Gold Prairie – Director: Isshin Inudo

- Special Jury Prize

Pups – Director: Ash

- Minami Toshiko Award

Jin-Roh – Director: Hiroyuki Okiura

OFF THEATRE COMPETITION

- Grand Prize

Hazy Life – Director: Nobuhiro Yamashita

- Special Jury Prize

Let's Go Strawberry Girl – Director: Shinobu Kuribayashi

=== 2001 Awards ===
Held February 15–19, 2001.

- Grand Prize

New Year's Day – Director: Suri Krishnamma

- Special Jury Prize

Animals – Director: Michael Di Jiacomo

- Minami Toshiko Award

Siam Sunset – Director: John Polson

OFF THEATRE COMPETITION

- Grand Prize

Tokyo A Go Go – Director: Ryuichi Honda

- Special Jury Prize

L'Ilya – Director: Tomoya Sato

=== 2002 Awards ===
Held February 14–18, 2002.

- Grand Prize

My Sassy Girl – Director: Kwak Jae-yong

OFF THEATRE COMPETITION

- Grand Prize

Run! Yamazaki! Run! – Director: Naoko Johnori

- Special Jury Prize

Nuts – Director: Yoko Chukira / Tomokazu / Shu Kageyama

=== 2003 Awards ===
Held February 13–17, 2003.

- Grand Prize

Battlefield Baseball (Jigoku Koushien) – Director: Yūdai Yamaguchi

OFF THEATRE COMPETITION

- Grand Prize

Bijo-can – Director: Masaya Kakei

- Special Jury Prize

Ski Jumping Pairs – Director: Riichiro Mashima

=== 2004 Awards ===
Held February 19–23, 2004.

- Grand Prize

Mokpo, Gangster's Paradise – Director: Kim Ji-hoon

- Special Jury Prize

Robot Stories – Director: Greg Pak

- Minami Toshiko Award

Better Than Sex – Director: Su Chao-pin & Lee Feng-bor

OFF THEATRE COMPETITION

- Grand Prize

The Far East Apartment – Director: Tetsuya Mariko

- Special Jury Prize

Utsu-musume SAYURI – Director: Takashi Kimura

=== 2005 Awards ===
Held February 24–28, 2005.

- Grand Prize

My Mother, the Mermaid – Director: Park Heung-sik

- Special Jury Prize

Innocence – Director: Lucile Hadžihalilović

- Minami Toshiko Award

The Neighbor No. Thirteen – Director: Yasuo Inoue

OFF THEATRE COMPETITION

- Grand Prize

Mariko's 30 Pirates – Director: Tetsuya Mariko

- Special Jury Prize

Be the World for Her – Director: Daisuke Hosaka

=== 2006 Awards ===
Held February 23–27, 2006.

- Grand Prize

Blood Rain – Director: Kim Dae-seung

- Special Jury Prize

Never Belongs to Me – Director: Nam Ki-woong

- Minami Toshiko Award

Citizen Dog – Director: Wisit Sasanatieng

OFF THEATRE COMPETITION

- Grand Prize

Raw Summer (Nama-natsu) – Director: Keisuke Yoshida

- Special Jury Prize

Hakko – Director: Madoka Kumagai

=== 2007 Awards ===
No awards - festival cancelled.

=== 2008 Awards ===
Held March 19–23, 2008.

OFF THEATRE COMPETITION

- Grand Prize

A Woman Who Is Beating the Earth (大地を叩く女, Daichi o tataku onna) – Director: Tsuki Inoue

- Special Jury Prize

Coming with My Brother (お姉ちゃん、弟といく, One-chan, otōto to iku) – Director: Kouta Yoshida

- Governor's Award

Seikilos and I (セイキロスさんとわたしく, Seikilos-san to Watashi) – Director: Kenji Itoso & Hiroshi Kamebuchi

=== 2009 Awards ===
Held February 26-March 2, 2009.

OFF THEATRE COMPETITION

- Grand Prize

8000 Miles (SR サイタマノラッパー, SR: Saitama no rappā) – Director: Yū Irie

- Special Jury Prize

Big Gun (大拳銃, Dai kenjū) – Director: Ōhata Hajime

- Governor's Award

Night Games (夜のゲーム, Yoru no geemu) – Director: Choi Uian (チェ・ウィアン)

=== 2010 Awards ===
Held February 25-March 1, 2010.

OFF THEATRE COMPETITION

- Grand Prize

Hot as Hell: The Deadbeat March (青春墓場〜明日と一緒に歩くのだ〜, Seishun Hakaba Ashita to Issho ni Aruku no da) – Director: Yōsuke Okuda

- Special Jury Prize

Footed Tadpoles (脚の生えたおたまじゃくし, Ashi no maeta otamajakushi) – Director: Tomoya Maeno

- Governor's Award

Wall (壁, Kabe) – Director: ヒョン・スルウ

- Cinegar Award

Footed Tadpoles (脚の生えたおたまじゃくし, Ashi no maeta otamajakushi) – Director: Tomoya Maeno

=== 2011 Awards ===
Held February 24–28, 2011.

OFF THEATRE COMPETITION

- Grand Prize

Invasion of Alien Bikini (겨울냄새) – Director: Oh Young-Doo

- Special Jury Prize

Pink Subaru (ピンク・スバル, Pinku Subaru) – Director: Kazuya Ogawa

- Governor's Award

Violence PM (バイオレンスPM, Baiorensu PM) – Director: Takayuki Ishihara

- Cinegar Award

Pink Subaru (ピンク・スバル, Pinku Subaru) – Director: Kazuya Ogawa

=== 2012 Awards ===
Held February 23–27, 2012 with a total attendance at 12,500.

OFF THEATRE COMPETITION

- Grand Prize

Osaka Violence (大阪外道, Ōsaka gedō) – Director: Takahiro Ishihara

- Special Jury Prize

The Brat! (くそガキの告白, Kusogaki no kokuhaku) – Director: Taichi Suzuki

- Governor's Award

The Beatles (ビートルズ, Bītoruzu) – Director: Yuichiro Sakashita

- Cinegar Award

The Brat! (くそガキの告白, Kusogaki no kokuhaku) – Director: Taichi Suzuki

- Best Actress

Nahana for Toilet and Women (どんずまり便器, Donzumari Benki)

- Best Actor

Hiroki Konno for The Brat! (くそガキの告白, Kusogaki no kokuhaku)

- Audience Award

Ultraman Saga (ウルトラマンサーガ, Urutoramansāga) - Director: Hideki Oka

- Event Award

Namba Kinyu-den Minami no Teio Toichi no Manda Ginjiro - Director: Takaaki Haginiwa

- Public Award

Puss in Boots (長ぐつをはいたネコ, Nagagutsu o Haita Neko)

- Public People Award

The Brat! (くそガキの告白, Kusogaki no kokuhaku) – Director: Taichi Suzuki

=== 2013 Awards ===
Held February 21–25, 2013. Attendance was about 12,500.

OFF THEATRE COMPETITION

- Grand Prize

There Is Light - Director: Yukihiro Toda

- Special Jury Prize

A Case of Eggs - Director: Yuri Kanchiku

- Governor's Award

Winter Alpaca - Director: Yuji Harada

- Cinegar Award

There Is Light - Director: Yukihiro Toda

=== 2014 Awards ===
Announced March 2, 2014

OFF THEATRE COMPETITION

- Grand Prize

The Pinkie - Director: Lisa Takeba

- Special Jury Prize

Gun Woman - Director: Mitsutake Kurando

- Governor's Award

School Girls' Gestation - Director: Ueda Atsushi

- Cinegar Award

The Pinkie - Director: Lisa Takeba

- Sky Perfect Movie Channel Award

Old Men Never Die - Director: Wang Cheol-min (South Korea)

=== 2015 Awards ===
Announced on February 24, 2015

OFF THEATRE COMPETITION

- Grand Prize

Makeup Room - Director: Kei Morikawa

- Special Jury Prize

The Limit of Sleeping Beauty - Director: Ninomiya Ken

- Governor's Award

Haman - Director: Tetsuya Okabe

- Cinegar Award

Mizo - Director: Nam Ki Woong (South Korea)

- Sky Perfect Movie Channel Award

Luv ya Hun! - Director: Daigo Matsui

== See also ==
- List of fantastic and horror film festivals

== Sources ==
- "Yubari International Fantastic Film Festival". [IMdB].
- Niskanen, Eija (July 13, 2009). "Yubari Hangs Steadily On". Midnight Eye.
- ""Waseda rules" Yubari International Film Festival". [www.yomiuri.co.jp].
