= Jam Films =

Collections of short films by different Japanese directors

Jam Films and its sequels are collections of short films, each by a different Japanese director.

== Jam Films ==
Jam Films is a 2002 suite of 7 shorts produced by Sega/Amuse (various production companies participated in the production of the films, e.g. Rockwell Eyes in "Arita Featuring Spencer A. Weezy").

The opening credits sequence for the collection was directed by Hanada Daizaburo.

1. "The Messenger -弔いは夜の果てで-" (Requiem for the Dead) - directed by Ryuhei Kitamura
2. "けん玉" (Kendama) - directed by Tetsuo Shinohara
3. "コールドスリープ" (Cold Sleep) - directed by George Iida
4. "Pandora - Hong Kong Leg" - directed by Rokurō Mochizuki
5. "Hijiki" - directed by Yukihiko Tsutsumi
6. "Justice" - directed by Isao Yukisada
7. "Arita" - directed by Shunji Iwai

== Jam Films 2 ==
Jam Films 2 is the 2004 sequel containing four shorts by different directors. Jam Films 2 is only available as a Region 2 or Region 3 DVD.

1. "机上の空論" (Kijo no Kuron) - directed by Junji Kojima (小島淳二)
2. "Clean Room" - directed by Eiki Takahashi (高橋栄樹)
3. "Hoops Men Soul" - directed by Hidenori Inoue (井上秀憲)
4. "Fastener" - directed by Kouki Tange (丹下絋希)

"Kijou no Kuron" or "Armchair Theory" is a satirical instructional film for how to woo a Japanese woman. Kojima followed this concept with a series of short films under the title "The Japanese Tradition" (日本の形). "Sushi", "Sumo", "Golf", "Geisha", "Apologizing", "Tea" and "Chopsticks" all follow the satirical plot of taking a Japanese custom and often twisting or exaggerating its components or meanings into something meaningless or comedic. Both short film series feature Jin Katagiri (片桐 仁) and Kentarō Kobayashi (小林 賢太郎), a Japanese comedy duo collectively knows as Rahmens (ラーメンズ) who often are a part of scriptwriting and production.

== Jam Films S ==
Jam Films S is a 2005 collection of shorts with the theme of the letter "S". All seven shorts in this entry were produced by Ryuhei Kitamura.

1. "Tuesday" - directed by Kenji Sonoda
2. "HEAVEN SENT" - directed by Ryuichi Takatsu
3. "ブラウス" (Blouse) - directed by Hitoshi Ishikawa
4. "NEW HORIZON" - directed by Ryo Teshima
5. "すべり台" (Suberidai) - directed by Yuichi Abe
6. "α" (Alpha) - directed by Hanada Daizaburo
7. "スーツ -suit-" - directed by Masaki Hamamoto
