= Hideo Sakaki =

Japanese actor (born 1970)

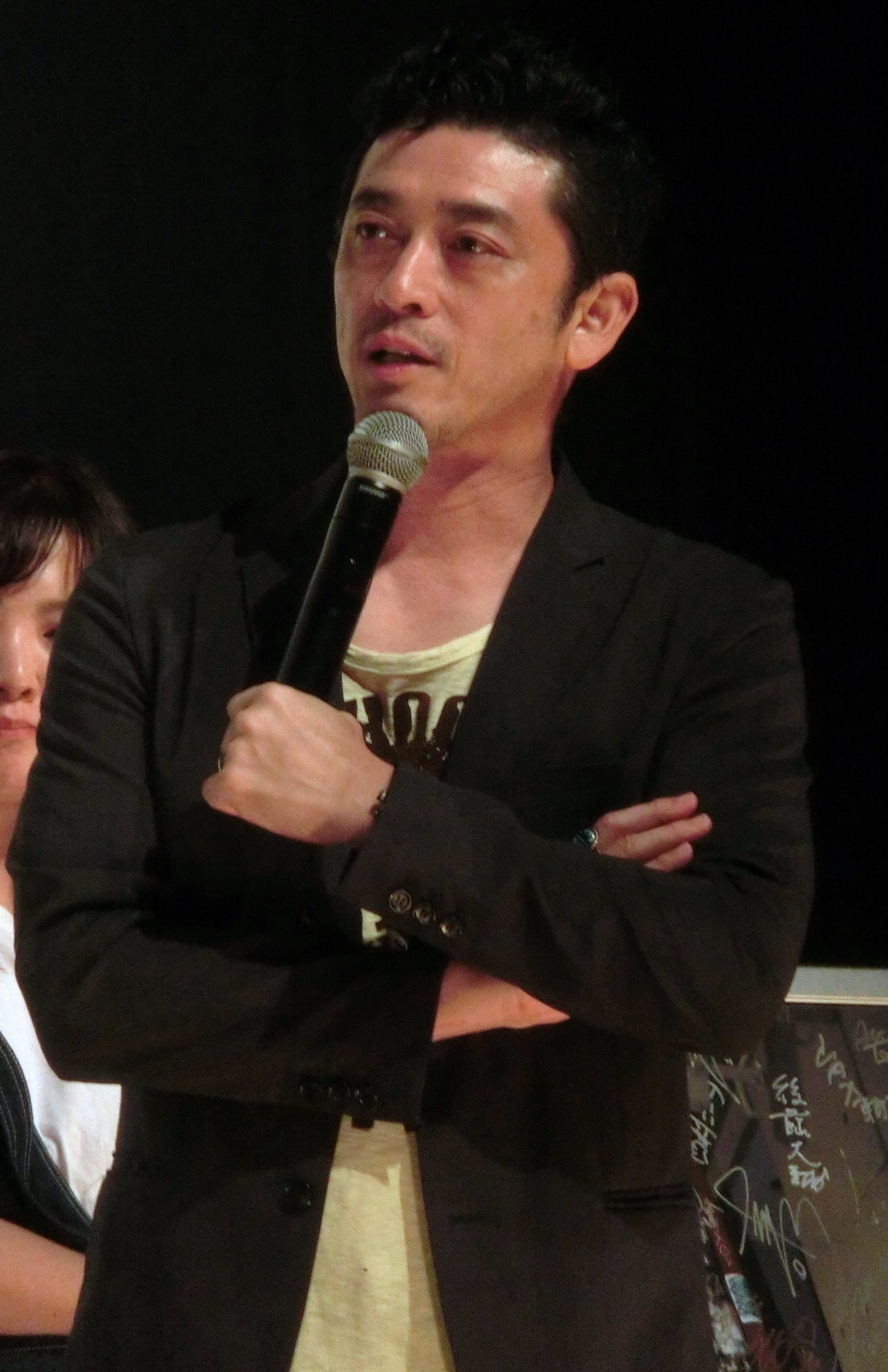
- Sakaki (2019)
- Born: June 4, 1970 (age 56); Gotō, Nagasaki, Japan
- Occupation: Actor
- Years active: 1994–2026

Hideo Sakaki (榊 英雄, Sakaki Hideo) (born June 4, 1970) is a Japanese actor. He is perhaps best known for his roles in the Japanese cult films Versus, Battlefield Baseball, and Alive. He is a close friend of director Ryuhei Kitamura and appears in several of his films.

== Sexual assault convictions ==
In March 2022, four actresses came forward with allegations that, beginning in 2011, Sakaki had coerced them into non-consensual sexual relationships. Sakaki had admitted to having intercourse with three of the four women, claiming it was consensual; he denied having any kind of relationship with the fourth woman. Houka Kinoshita, a close friend of Sakaki who had also appeared in several of Sakaki's films, had also been accused of sexual assault by three different women. The victims allege that Kinoshita and Sakaki collaborated in sexual coercion by introducing young women to each other that were looking to break into the film industry. Shortly after the allegations surfaced, Sakaki's wife Izumi released a statement apologizing to the victims and confirming to end her marriage with Sakaki. On 20 February 2024, Sakaki was arrested after a woman then in her 20s accused him of sexually assaulting her at a condominium in Minato, Tokyo, under pretenses of providing acting advice in 2016.

On 6 March 2026, Sasaki was sentenced to eight years in prison for the sexual assault of two women.

== Filmography ==
=== Film ===
Year	Title	Role	Notes	Ref.
1995	Kono mado wa kimi no mono	Taro		
2000	Versus	The Man		
2002	Alive	Tenshu Yashiro		
2002	Ju-On: The Grudge	Welfare Center Clerk		
2002	Alter Ego	Kôhei Yamazaki		
2003	Aragami	Wounded samurai		
2003	Azumi	Nagato		
2003	Battlefield Baseball	Hôichi		
2003	Suicide Manual	Keita Yashiro		
2004	Longinus	Head vampire	Featurette	
2004	Is A.	Ryo Tajima		
2004	Gachapon			
2004	Otôsan no backdrop			
2004	Shinkuronishiti			
2004	Godzilla: Final Wars	Eclair crew member		
2005	Yakuza Ladies: Burning Desire			
2005	Shiawase nara te o tatakô			
2006	Paradise: What Is Being Done			
2006	LoveDeath			
2006	Kiraware Matsuko no isshô			
2007	The Dark Corners of the Shelves	Ryosuke Shindo		
2007	Densen uta	Toyokawa		
2007	Oyaji			
2008	Esu esu			
2008	Be a Man! Samurai School	Omito		
2008	Dâku rabu: Rape			
2008	Kyûka			
2009	Map of the Sounds of Tokyo	Ishida		
2010	Yûkai Rhapsody	Kishida	Also director	
2011	Black Angels			
2011	The Detective Is in the Bar			
2012	Kamen Rider × Super Sentai: Super Hero Taisen	Takeshi Kuroki		
2012	Tokumei Sentai Go-Busters the Movie: Protect the Tokyo Enetower!	Takeshi Kuroki	Short film	
2013	Tokumei Sentai Go-Busters vs. Kaizoku Sentai Gokaiger: The Movie	Takeshi Kuroki		
2013	Kamen Rider × Super Sentai × Space Sheriff: Super Hero Taisen Z	Takeshi Kuroki		
2013	Tokumei Sentai Go-Busters Returns vs. Dôbutsu Sentai Go-Busters			
2013	Shin Usagi: Yasei no touhai	Kazama		
2014	Zyuden Sentai Kyoryuger vs. Go-Busters	Takeshi Kuroki		
2014	Girl's Blood	Ranmaru Ando		
2014	We're a Bounty Hunter Team	Shoichiro Baba		
2014	Flower and Snake: Zero	Saito		
2014	Still the Water			
2015	Broken Hearts for Sale			
2016	Samayô ageha: Mitsu tsubo torotoro	Theater manager	Also director	
2016	Hadaka no gekidan: Ikiritatsu yokubô	Theater manager	Also director	
2017	Blank 13			
2017	Hurricane Polymar	Kato		
2017	Alley Cat		Director	
2018	Dô shiyô mo nai koi no uta			
2018	Fire Fox Tochionger Seven, the Movie: King of Hell	Hell's messenger		
2018	Red Blade			
2019	Inbi-dan: Ano ko no shitatari			
2020	Mashô shiri: Omae ga hoshii			
2021	Utae! Love song furete G kôdo			

=== Television ===
Year	Title	Role	Notes
2001	Doctor/Kranke	Shibusawa	TV miniseries
2002	The Woman of S.R.I.		8 episodes
2003	Demon Hunting		TV film
2003	Series Kyoufu Yawa	Mr. Kamata	1 episode
2003	Sky High	Tomiko Higashi/Officer Kitajima	4 episodes
2005	Jôô	Ôgami	5 episodes
2005-2017	AIBOU: Tokyo Detective Duo	Masanori Akiyama/Moriichi Gunji/Saburo Oba	3 episodes
2006	Unfair	Imai Hideaki	TV miniseries
2007	The Trusted Confidant	Shichirozaemon Matsuda	2 episodes
2008	Pandora		3 episodes
2008	Hitmaker: Aku Yu monogatari	Doi	TV film
2009	Meido deka	Hirotaro Iijima	1 episode
2011	Lady: Saigo no hanzai purofairu	Kajiyama	1 episode
2011	Hunter: Sono Onnatachi, Shoukin Kasegi		1 episode
2012	SP - Keishichô Keigoka 2	Nakahata	TV film
2012	The Ending Planner	Ohbayashi	2 episodes
2012	Papadoru!	Director	1 episode
2012	Legal High	Kanazawa Seiji	1 episode
2012	Monsters		TV miniseries; 1 episode
2012	Tokumei Sentai Go-Busters	Takeshi Kuroki	50 episodes
2013	Ferris Wheel at Night	Tanaka Koji	TV miniseries; 2 episodes
2013	Hanchô: Jinnansho Azumihan	Jiro Sakaki	2 episodes
2013	Sennyû tantei Tokage		1 episode
2013	Haitatsusaretai watashitachi		TV miniseries; 5 episodes
2014	Howaito rabo: Keishichou tokubetsu kagaku sousahan		TV miniseries; 1 episode
2014	The Roosevelt Game	TV miniseries; 1 episode	TV miniseries; 1 episode
2015	Kyôto Ninjô Sôsa File		TV miniseries; 1 episode
2016	Makanai sô		TV miniseries; 10 episodes
2016	Otoko meshi		TV miniseries; 1 episode
2019	Butler Saionji's Great Reasoning	Yusaku Kubo	1 episode
2019	Unfinished		
2020	Special Investigation Nine	Hideo Katayama	1 episode
2020	Cop Seven	Tatsuma Miyajima	1 episode
2021	Wanmoa		1 episode
