= Yūdai Yamaguchi =

Japanese film director (born 1971)

- Born: 1971 (age 54–55); Japan
- Occupations: Film director Screenwriter
- Years active: 1999 –

Yūdai Yamaguchi (山口 雄大, Yamaguchi Yūdai; born 1971) is a Japanese film director who has worked mainly in the comedy and horror genres. He has "made a name for himself by mixing goofy gore with manga-esque escapades and plain utter weirdness".

== Life and career ==
Yamaguchi was born in 1971 and attended the Japan Academy of Moving Images (日本映画学校, Nihon Eiga Gakkō). After graduation he won a number of awards at independent film festivals. In 2000 he co-wrote (with director Ryuhei Kitamura) the action-horror film Versus (VERSUS ヴァーサス) starring Tak Sakaguchi. Yamaguchi was also a second-unit director on the movie.

He made his debut as a feature film director with Battlefield Baseball released theatrically in July 2003. This horror-sports-comedy again starred Tak Sakaguchi and the film won the Grand Prize at the 14th Yubari International Fantastic Film Festival held in February 2003. Yamaguchi was a guest at the festival. He followed this in 2004 with Babaa Zone, a compilation of five short skits in collaboration with manga artist Gatarō Man. In late 2004, Yamaguchi was one of the directors of Takashi Shimizu's comedy-horror TV series The Great Horror Family (怪奇大家族, Kaiki daikazoku).

As with Battlefield Baseball, his next feature, Cromartie High - The Movie from July 2005, was based on a manga series (Cromartie High School). This episodic comedy, which made its New York premiere at the 2006 New York Asian Film Festival, revolves around the hapless Cromartie High with a student body composed of thugs, yakuza look-alikes, a giant, a gorilla and an obnoxious robot. Kamiyama, seemingly the only normal student, tries to improve things - but then the aliens invade.

Yamaguchi's September 2006 film Meatball Machine, which he co-directed with Jun'ichi Yamamoto based on an earlier film by Yamamoto, has aliens taking over human bodies and turning them into bio-mechanical monsters. In August 2008, Yamaguchi released Tamami: The Baby's Curse, a horror story about a monster-baby which is a more subdued work than his previous manic comedy efforts. Along with Noboru Iguchi, Yamaguchi directed the fake TV commercials for good friend Yoshihiro Nishimura's cult horror film Tokyo Gore Police after Yamaguchi suggested that it might balance out the dark tone of the movie.

In a change of pace, Yamaguchi left the horror aspects behind to direct a straight comedy in the February 2009 release Elite Yankee Saburo with special makeup effects by Yoshihiro Nishimura. The film followed a Japanese TV comedy shown on TV Tokyo in 2007 which was itself based on a manga by Shuji Abe about a nerdy boy entering high school who because his older brothers were delinquents is also labeled a troublemaker - an "elite yankee". The movie retained the original cast from the TV series including lead actor Hideo Ishiguro.

== Filmography ==
| Year | Title (English) | Title (Original) | Occupation |
|---|---|---|---|
| 2000 | Versus | VERSUS ヴァーサス (VERSUS Vāsasu) | Writer |
| 2002 | Alive | ALIVE アライヴ (ALIVE Araivu) | Writer |
| 2003 | 3 On 3 | スリー・オン・スリー (Surii On Surii) | Writer |
| 2003 | Battlefield Baseball | 地獄甲子園 (Jigoku Kōshien, "Hell Stadium") | Director-Writer |
| 2004 | Hole (1 of 4 parts) | 穴 (Ana) | Director |
| 2004 | Babaa Zone | 漫☆画太郎SHOW ババアゾーン (Man*Ga Tarou Show: Babaa Zōn) | Director |
| 2005 | Cromartie High - The Movie | 魁!!クロマティ高校 THE★MOVIE (Sakigake!! Kuromati Kōkō the Movie, "Charge! Cromartie High School: the Movie") | Director |
| 2005 | Kazuo Umezu's Horror Theater: Present | 楳図かずお恐怖劇場 プレゼント (Umezu Kazuo: Kyōfu gekijō - Purezento) | Director |
| 2006 | Meatball Machine | ミートボールマシン (Mītobōru Mashin) | Director |
| 2006 | Ten Nights of Dreams (episode: The Tenth Dream) | 夢十夜 (Yume jūya) | Director |
| 2008 | Tamami: The Baby's Curse | 赤んぼ少女 (Akanbo shōjo, "Baby Girl") | Director |
| 2009 | Elite Yankee Saburo | 激情版 エリートヤンキー三郎 (Gekijōban: Eriito Yankii Saburō, "Elite Yankee Saburo: the Movie") | Director |
| 2011 | Yakuza Weapon | 極道兵器 (Gokudô Heiki) | Director-Writer |
| 2011 | Deadball | デッドボール (Deddobōru) | Director |
| 2022 | 1%er: One-Percenter | 1%er | Director |
