= Battlefield Baseball =

- Film poster

Japanese name
- Kanji: 地獄甲子園
Transcriptions
- Revised Hepburn: Jigoku Kōshien
- Directed by: Yūdai Yamaguchi
- Written by: Gatarō Man
- Produced by: Ryuhei Kitamura
- Starring: Tak Sakaguchi; Atsushi Itō; Hideo Sakaki
- Edited by: Shuichi Kakesu
- Music by: Daisuke Yano
- Distributed by: Klock Worx Co.
- Release date: July 19, 2003 (Japan)
- Running time: 87 minutes
- Country: Japan
- Language: Japanese

Battlefield Baseball (Japanese: 地獄甲子園, Hepburn: Jigoku Kōshien; lit. "Hell Kōshien") is a 2003 Japanese film directed by Yūdai Yamaguchi. The film is written by Gatarō Man, based on his manga series of the same name, and stars Tak Sakaguchi, Atsushi Itō, and Hideo Sakaki. It was produced by Ryuhei Kitamura.

The film is a combination of several genres, mixing martial arts action with the clichés of the sports film—particularly skewering baseball, one of Japan's most popular high school sports—and the violence and brutality of a horror film. The film's bizarre—sometimes almost incoherent—plot, blood and gore, and unique comedy have given it something of a "cult" popularity in the Western world.

The film was released on Region 1 DVD by Subversive Cinema.

== Plot ==
For the first time in years, Seido High School has a chance to attend the legendary Koshien Stadium Tournament thanks to its star player Gorilla Matsui. Most delighted at this prospect is Principal Kocho. However, the Head teacher reveals to him that the first game will be played against the Gedo High School, infamous for brutally killing all their opponents. Kocho instantly loses all hope, both for his students' lives and winning the tournament.

Seido's bumbling catcher Megane, or "Four Eyes," named such for his glasses, is fetching a wayward ball and ends up cornered by a gang of expelled students. Newly transferred student Jubeh appears on the scene and defends Four Eyes from the gang. Kocho witnesses as Jubeh engages the dropouts leader Bancho (Japanese for "boss" or "leader") in a round of "fighting baseball" and prevails. Impressed, Kocho begs for Jubeh to join the baseball team, but Jubeh refuses as he took a vow. However, Bancho reappears and joins the team, thanks to Jubeh's punches curing the injuries that prevented him from playing.

When confronted by Four Eyes, Jubeh musically laments his pitching skill, explaining how he became so skilled he was a danger to himself and others. Jubeh accidentally killed his father with a baseball pitch to the head, causing him to vow not to play baseball again. Four Eyes says he loves the sport as he keeps playing despite his lack of talent and hiding from his baseball-hating mother and insists Jubeh has this love. Touched, Jubeh joins the team.

However, when the game against Gedo starts, Jubeh is nowhere to be found, and Four Eyes wanders off to find him. Jubeh arrives only to find Seido already slaughtered, and an exploding decoy kills him. In the afterlife, Jubeh finds his father, who tells him to embrace his skills and defeat Gedo for the good of everyone. Inspired, Jubeh returns from the grave, as does Bancho, who also met Jubeh's father in the afterlife and was given the mitt that can stop Jubeh's pitch.

Four Eyes' mother finds out he plays baseball and locks him in a cage. Jubeh comes to the rescue and fights her, and as he gains the upper hand, he asks why she hates baseball. As she tells that her father died to a baseball and Four Eyes' brother disappeared, Jubeh realizes the two are his family. In jubilation, their mother gives Four Eyes permission to play. Jubeh, Four Eyes, Bancho and Kocho form a new Seido team. Head Teacher and Gorilla, now cyborgs, one of the school's cheerleaders, and Four Eyes' mother also team up to defeat Gedo.

Ultimately, all except Jubeh and the Gedo coach have been knocked unconscious. After a duel, Jubeh is knocked down, and the coach prepares to stab him with a poison-injecting baseball bat. Four Eyes sacrifices himself to intercept the coach's attack. Jubeh, furious at the loss of his brother, leaps up and bitterly attacks the coach. However, before he can kill the coach, the Gedo players plead for his life, explaining how he brought them out of orphanages and became like a father to them. Jubeh allows the coach to live.

A crowd gathers as the coach gains a newfound respect for life and gives Jubeh the antidote for the poison. However, one of the Gedo players emerges and guns down everyone on the field except Jubeh. Looking around in outrage, Jubeh sheds a tear. As cherry blossoms fall, everyone on the field returns to life before Jubeh attacks the bandaged gunman, literally knocking the muscles off his bones.

Joyously, the crowd celebrates, and the narrator (who turned out to be the bleacher's drunkard's dog) states that they lived happily ever- including the one person on the field that day not resurrected by Jubeh's tears.

== Reception ==
The reaction to the film has been for the most part lukewarm. Though many praised its irreverent and unique style, others found the purposefully ludicrous plot hard to follow and indicative of a lack of effort on the screenwriter's part. However, the film did win the Grand Prize at the 14th Yubari International Fantastic Film Festival held in February 2003. Director Yūdai Yamaguchi was a guest at the festival.

The film has been compared with other Japanese films featuring baseball prominently. For instance, one reviewer compared it to 1992's Mr. Baseball, explaining that it was better than that film due to a relative lack of actual baseball. The parodic aspect of the film takes so much precedence that the clichés of baseball films are skewered more than baseball itself.

One of the key aspects of the film is its intentional strangeness. The strangest aspects of the plot (the frequent reappearances of a crowd and an alcoholic man, Head Teacher and Gorilla returning as cyborgs, etc.) are more prominent than the plot in the minds of most reviewers.

Most reviewers agree that the film is high art. It is a good martial arts/horror/comedy film—they say that it is interesting and exciting enough to keep one watching until the end credits. The film's humour is often highly praised, lightening up what would otherwise be a superficial and generic action film. The film has received some criticism, largely that it is ludicrous and "stupid", or that its plot does not sustain its length. However, others argue that this is not only irrelevant—The film is intended to be ludicrous and stupid—it is actually one of the strengths of the film.

== See also ==
- List of baseball films
