= Ryuhei Kitamura =

Japanese filmmaker

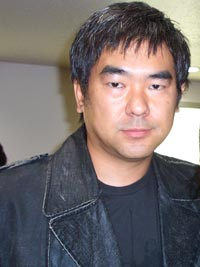
- Born: May 30, 1969 (age 57); Osaka, Japan
- Occupation: Filmmaker
- Years active: 1997–present

Japanese name
- Kanji: 北村龍平
- Romanization: Kitamura Ryūhei

Ryuhei Kitamura (北村龍平, Kitamura Ryūhei; May 30, 1969) is a Japanese film director, producer, and screenwriter. Kitamura relocated to Sydney, Australia at age 17 and attended a school for visual arts for two years. In 1997, Kitamura directed and produced the short film Down to Hell, which received a positive response from students, teachers, and an award which motivated Kitamura to seriously pursue a film career. He went on to independently finance and direct his feature film debut Versus (2000). The film proved to be successful within the film festival circuit and opened doors for Kitamura to direct more high-profile films such as Alive (2002), Sky High (2003), Godzilla: Final Wars (2004), The Midnight Meat Train (2008), No One Lives (2012), the live-action adaptation of Lupin the 3rd (2014), and several other Japanese and Hollywood productions.

== Biography ==
=== Early life ===
Ryuhei Kitamura was born in Osaka Prefecture, Japan. Kitamura spent more of his adolescent years at the cinema than school. At the age of 16, he chose to become a filmmaker since he figured he "loved watching movies." The following year, Kitamura dropped out of high school, directly telling his teacher and walking out during class, and moved to Australia a week later. Kitamura chose Australia because most of his influences are Australian, such as George Miller, Russel Mulcahy, Peter Weir, and INXS. Kitamura attended a school for visual arts in Sydney for two years, after he directly asked the principal to simply let him in, "he thought that I was a funny guy, so he let me in."

=== Career ===
After graduating, he returned to Japan to establish Napalm Films, his independent production studio. His featurettes Down to Hell and Heat after Dark were successful in film festivals, and he soon found his first mainstream success with the cult film Versus. The film launched the career of stars Tak Sakaguchi and Hideo Sakaki, and brought Kitamura international recognition when it was released on DVD outside Japan in 2004.

In 2002, Kitamura directed the short film The Messenger: Requiem for the Dead as part of the Jam Films project, as well as Alive. In 2003, he directed a feature film adaptation of the manga Azumi, and Sky High, a prequel to the popular Japanese television drama. He collaborated with director Yukihiko Tsutsumi in the Duel Project, in which the two challenged one another to produce the best dueling movie with minimal production time and budget, with Aragami being Kitamura's contribution. Also in 2003, Kitamura served as producer for the film Battlefield Baseball, the directorial debut of Versus co-writer Yūdai Yamaguchi. Kitamura directed 2004's Godzilla: Final Wars, the 28th installment in the renowned kaiju franchise. The film was the first of Kitamura's projects to hold its premiere in Hollywood. In 2006, Kitmura directed LoveDeath, before relocating to Los Angeles, California.

In 2003, he directed the in-game cutscenes for Metal Gear Solid: The Twin Snakes, a remake of Metal Gear Solid for the GameCube, released in 2004. Unlike previous titles in the series, The Twin Snakes was developed by Silicon Knights and produced by Konami. The game featured similar mechanics to Metal Gear Solid 2: Sons of Liberty due to having been made on the same engine. Kitamura's direction of the cutscenes was viewed as controversial, criticism leveled at its Matrix-like action tone and unrealistic stunts performed by the characters. Regardless, it went on to receive positive reviews from video game review sites.

In 2008, Kitamura made his American filmmaking debut with Midnight Meat Train based on Clive Barker's short horror story of the same name. The film (starring Bradley Cooper, Vinnie Jones, and Brooke Shields) was distributed by Lionsgate, and released directly to the secondary market on August 1, 2008. Despite receiving positive reviews from critics, the film was a box office failure. Kitamura's next directorial venture did not come until 2012 with No One Lives, starring Luke Evans and Adelaide Clemens. It was shown as part of the Midnight Madness portion of the 2012 Toronto International Film Festival, and received a limited theatrical release on May 10, 2013.

While promoting No One Lives, Kitamura announced that he was working on his "comeback" film in Japan, stating in an interview, "It's a completely different role than what I've done before. It's also not a bloody movie, not a horror movie. It's a big action movie." In November, 2013, the project was revealed to be Lupin III, a modern adaptation of the iconic manga by Monkey Punch. The film was released in Japan on August 30, 2014.

Kitamura's 2017 thriller film, Downrange, was announced to premiere at Toronto International Film Festival in September 2017. The film follows a group of people on a road trip who are trapped on a country road by a sniper. In 2018, Kitamura directed a segment in the anthology horror film Nightmare Cinema.

=== Other projects ===
In 2010, Kitamura was announced as director for Black Friday 3D. In 2012, he became attached to direct Marble City, with Nicolas Cage initially attached to star. In May 2013, Kitamura confirmed that he has written the script for Versus 2, and that Tak Sakaguchi would likely reprise his role from the original film. In September 2015, it was announced that Kitamura would direct the supernatural thriller Vessels for Ubiquity Studios, to be filmed in early 2016.

== Personal life ==
Kitamura speaks English fluently. His favorite Godzilla film is Godzilla vs. Mechagodzilla (1974), and his favourite kaiju is King Caesar. He has expressed admiration for fellow Japanese director Shunji Iwai, asserting that the film Swallowtail Butterfly is "the best Japanese movie ever made." He has stated that his "dream project" would be to direct an installment in the Mad Max film franchise.

== Filmography ==
=== Short film ===
Year	Title	Director	Writer	Producer	Notes
1988	Exit	Yes			
1997	Down to Hell (ダウン・トゥ・ヘル)	Yes	Yes	Yes	Also Ponytail Thug
1997	Heat After Dark (ヒート・アフター・ダーク)	Yes	Yes		
2002	The Messenger (-弔いは夜の果てで-)	Yes	Yes		
2004	Longinus (ロンギヌス)	Yes	Yes		

=== Feature film ===
Year	Title	Director	Writer	Producer	Notes
2000	Versus (ヴァーサス)	Yes	Yes		Feature film debut
2002	Alive (アライブ)	Yes	Yes		
2003	Aragami (荒神)	Yes	Yes		
2003	Azumi (あずみ)	Yes			
2003	Battlefield Baseball (地獄甲子園)			Yes	
2003	Sky High (スカイハイ)	Yes			
2004	Sakurajima	Yes			Video documentary
2004	Godzilla: Final Wars (ゴジラ ファイナル ウォーズ)	Yes			Role: Radio DJ
2006	LoveDeath (ラブデス)	Yes	Yes	Yes	
2006	Ren'ai shōsetsu (恋愛小説)	Yes			TV film Co-directed w/ Etsushi Toyokawa
2008	The Midnight Meat Train	Yes			Hollywood debut
2008	Yoroi Samurai Zombie (鎧 サムライゾンビ)		Yes		
2009	Baton (バトン)	Yes			
2011	Hellgate			Yes	
2012	No One Lives	Yes			
2014	Lupin the 3rd (ルパン三世)	Yes			
2017	Downrange	Yes			
2018	Nightmare Cinema	Yes			Mashit segment
2020	The Doorman	Yes			
2022	The Price We Pay	Yes			
2022	Three Sisters of Tenmasou (天間荘の三姉妹)	Yes			

=== Video games ===
Year	Title	Director	Writer	Producer	Notes
2004	Metal Gear Solid: The Twin Snakes (メタルギアソリッド ザ・ツインスネークス)	Yes			in-game cutscenes
