= Versus (2000 film) =

2000 zombie film by Ryuhei Kitamura

- Theatrical release poster

Japanese name
- Kanji: ヴァーサス
Transcriptions
- Revised Hepburn: Vāsasu
- Directed by: Ryuhei Kitamura
- Written by: Ryuhei Kitamura; Yūdai Yamaguchi
- Produced by: Keishiro Shin
- Starring: Tak Sakaguchi; Hideo Sakaki; Chieko Misaka; Kenji Matsuda
- Cinematography: Takumi Furuya
- Edited by: Shuichi Kakesu
- Music by: Nobuhiko Morino
- Production companies: Napalm Films; Wevco Production
- Distributed by: Distant Horizon
- Release date: October 29, 2000 (Tokyo International Film Festival)
- Running time: 120 minutes
- Country: Japan
- Language: Japanese
- Budget: $400,000

Versus (ヴァーサス, Vāsasu) is a 2000 Japanese zombie action horror film directed and co-written by Ryuhei Kitamura. The film was an independent co–production between Kitamura's company Napalm Films and Wevco Production in association with KSS and Suplex. In the film, a nameless prisoner, a nameless female and her Yakuza abductors fend off zombies in a forest that resurrects the dead while the Yakuza's mysterious leader attempts to open a supernatural gate hidden within the forest and seize its dark power.

The film was originally intended as a sequel to Kitamura's short film Down to Hell but was re-developed as a new film. Principal photography was originally intended to last 3 weeks but was extended to 7 months due to weather and financial issues.

Versus premiered at the Tokyo International Fantastic Film Festival on October 29, 2000. In 2004, an expanded edition titled Ultimate Versus was released that featured 10 minutes of new footage and improved music, effects, titles, and edits.

== Plot ==
There are 666 portals on Earth that connect it to Hell. To gain the power of darkness, many seek to find and open the portals. Somewhere in Japan exists the 444th portal known as The Forest of Resurrection.

In 10th century Japan, a lone samurai fends off a horde of zombie-like samurai creatures. After vanquishing the zombies, the samurai is confronted by a mysterious priest and his league of warriors. To take out the priest, the samurai charges but is easily killed. Before dying, the samurai spots an ally behind him, who arrives too late to save him.

In present-day Japan, two prisoners escape through a forest and meet up with a gang of yakuzas.

After seeing a girl that the gang kidnapped, Prisoner KSC2-303 becomes suspicious of what they plan to do with her. After an argument, KSC2-303 kills one of the Yakuza members, who resurrects as a zombie. During the ensuing chaos, KSC2-303 escapes back into the forest with The Girl. Disobeying their orders to wait, the Yakuza pursue KSC2-303 and The Girl.

KSC2-303 and The Girl come across a dead man crucified upon a tree. KSC2-303 steals the corpses's clothes and is confronted by one of the Yakuza. They engage in hand-to-hand combat while the other Yakuza face problems of their own. The corpses of all the men they have killed and buried in the forest resurrect and attack them. KSC2-303 and the other Yakuza reluctantly cooperate to battle the zombies.

With the horde of zombies growing, the Yakuza call upon three assassins to aid them. The Yakuza leader, The Man, eventually arrives and confronts them, angry that they lost KSC2-303 and The Girl. The Yakuza and Assassins take the upper hand and kill him first. But The Man easily jumps back to his feet and turns the Assassins and Yakuza into his own minions. Two of the Assassins escape and find KSC2-303. One is defeated by The Girl with a log, and the other is confronted by The Man and killed.

KSC2-303 attempts to force The Girl to reveal what is going on, believing that she is hiding secrets from him. Before she can reveal anything, The Man finds KSC2-303 and The Girl. The Man says that they are reincarnations of past lives. He plans to use The Girl as a sacrifice to open the portal hidden in The Forest of Resurrection and obtain the power of darkness. Unable to believe the Man, KSC2-303 attempts to kill him but is killed instead.

The Girl reaches KSC2-303's corpse and feeds him some of her blood before being taken by The Man's minions. During his unconscious state, KSC2-303 experiences a flashback of his past life in the 10th century and learns that he was the ally who was too late to save the samurai. He and The Girl (who was actually a princess) were confronted by the priest (who turns out to be The Man) and his gang. Outnumbered, KSC2-303 reluctantly killed The Girl in his past life to stop The Man from obtaining the power of darkness. Enraged, The Man killed KSC2-303.

The following morning, KSC2-303 confronts The Man and his minions. KSC2-303 takes on the minions first and wins, leaving only The Man left. KSC2-303 decapitates The Man and rescues The Girl, and both make their escape from The Forest of Resurrection.

99 years later, Earth lies in ruin. The reincarnation of The Man travels through the remains of a city, and eventually confronts KSC2-303 and the reincarnated versions of The Man's gang (who now work for KSC2-303). The Girl, held against her will, tells The Man that she should have been on his side 99 years earlier. With nothing left to destroy in this world, KSC2-303 asks The Man to take him to Hell. The Man and KSC2-303 charge at each other and engage in battle one more time.

== Cast ==
- Tak Sakaguchi as Prisoner KSC2-303
- Hideo Sakaki as The Man
- Chieko Misaka as The Girl
- Kenji Matsuda as Yakuza Leader with butterfly knife
- Yuichiro Arai as Motorcycle-riding yakuza with revolver
- Minoru Matsumoto as Crazy yakuza with amulet
- Kazuhito Ohba as Yakuza with glasses
- Takehiro Katayama as Red-haired assassin
- Ayumi Yoshihara as Long-haired female assassin
- Shōichirō Masumoto as One-handed cop
- Toshiro Kamiaka as Samurai warrior
- Yukihito Tanikado as Cop with Barrett
- Hoshimi Asai as Short-haired female assassin
- Ryosuke Watabe as Yakuza zombie in alligator-skin coat
- Motonari Komiya as Other prisoner

== Production ==
=== Development ===
Originally, Versus was intended to be a sequel to director Kitamura's "amateur" short film Down to Hell, with the intention of also shooting Versus on video with a low budget as he did with Down to Hell but instead decided to shoot on film with budget of $10,000 for a theatrical release.

According to Kitamura, he raised the money to independently produce Versus by borrowing money from friends and family after Producers refused to produce an action film with him because, to them, it was impossible to achieve due to the lack of time and money. Filming was originally planned to last 3 weeks but was extended to 7 months due to weather and financial issues.

=== Casting ===
Tak Sakaguchi was hired for the lead after director Kitamura saw a gag video that featured Sakaguchi. Kitamura's main reason for hiring Sakaguchi was because he had "a beautiful smile;" however, Sakaguchi claims he met Kitamura during a street fight that Sakaguchi was involved in. Kitamura offered him a role in his film after asking him if he'd rather fight in the streets or fight in his films. Kitamura later vouched as well that he met Sakaguchi during a street fight.

=== Influences ===
In the film's North American DVD/Blu-ray audio commentary, Kitamura has stated that Versus pays homage to such films as The Evil Dead and Highlander, which the film has been compared to by some critics. Director Kitamura stated that Versus was inspired by the films of Sam Raimi, John Carpenter, and George Miller. Versus combines elements of multiple genres such as gunplay, martial arts action, chanbara sword fighting, zombie horror, and comedy. Director Kitamura made this creative decision because he believed Versus could have been the first and last film he'd ever produce and chose to risk everything by adding film elements that influenced him. Regarding the film's style, Kitamura stated: "It’s all me. It’s all Ryuhei Kitamura-style, and I’m not going to try to change or steer away from anything. I’m only trying to get better."

The film did not receive the title Versus until the end of shooting. During production, the film was referred to as The Return: Down 2 Hell, despite the fact that the film was not going to be released under that title. In fact, a friend of Kitamura's (who would end up working with the director as a second unit director for Godzilla: Final Wars) suggested the title Versus to reference the struggles Kitamura suffered through while trying to launch his career.

I didn't actually have the title Versus until the very end of shooting. We were still using 'Return to Hell: Down to Hell 2' as a title. Of course it wasn't Down to Hell 2 at all anymore, but I couldn't come up with a good title. Then my best friend - he went to Australia with me when I was 17 and he is now the second unit director on Godzilla, shooting the overseas sequences - he was shooting the making of Versus at the time and I told him I couldn't come up with a good title. He told me, "All your life you've been fighting, and this movie is all you, so you should call it Versus." He is the one that came up with that excellent title"

— Ryuhei Kitamura, interview with Midnight Eye

== Release ==
Versus held its premiere at the Tokyo International Fantastic Film Festival on October 29, 2000.

=== Reception ===
Review aggregation website Rotten Tomatoes has a 75% approval based on 15 reviews with an average score of 6.5/10.

ScreenAnarchy said, "In 2000, Japanese director Ryuhei Kitamura unleashed unto the world one of the greatest offerings of Japanese cult cinema: Versus."

Harry Knowles of Ain't It Cool News commented on the film, "One of the most fun horror - action - comedy - cult films I've seen in a very, very long time."

DVD Talk called Versus, “A low budget exercise in style over substance, Versus, is, nevertheless, a pretty fun watch. It isn't a perfect film, however.”

== Alternate cuts ==
There are three different cuts of Versus, the original cut, the R-rated cut, and the Ultimate Edition. Prior to being released commercially in the United States in 2004, DVD distributor Media Blasters produced an R-rated edited cut which removed the film's gore scenes. As a result, the R-rated cut is four minutes shorter than the original cut. Around that same time, Ultimate Versus was produced and released which featured ten minutes of new footage as well as some alterations.

=== Ultimate Versus ===
In 2004, director Kitamura and most of the original cast and crew returned to the forest to film new scenes to further realize Kitamura's vision of the film. Tak Sakaguchi directed the action sequences for the new footage due to Yûji Shimomura being unavailable at the time. The new footage was shot in five days at the same location where the original production was shot. Released in a 3-disc DVD set by Media Blasters/Tokyo Shock, a majority of the film now features some sort of reworking, be it color correction, new music, added action sequences, or full scene replacement. The result is a fuller story and character development, with additional effects. Ultimate Versus runs at 130 minutes.

== Remake and sequel ==
In 2008, around the release of his American directorial debut Midnight Meat Train, Ryuhei Kitamura began mentioning a possible American remake of Versus. Kitamura managed to write a full script for the American version and has stated that "The US Versus will be insane!" On an audio commentary for the film, Kitamura has said that if a sequel would ever be made, it would pick up to where the first film ended, taking place 99 years into the future.

In a 2010 interview, Kitamura commented on the remake "This year [2010] will be tenth anniversary year of Versus so I’m thinking of doing something special. The original film means a lot to me and has huge fans all over the world, so I can’t do anything easy or cheap – I can’t guarantee anything in the long run, it’s a definite that I’ll do the new Versus in the future for sure."

In May 2013, while promoting the film No One Lives, Kitamura announced that a sequel to Versus was in development, tentatively titled Versus 2. He confirmed that he had written the script, and that Sakaguchi would likely reprise his role as KSC2-303. Kitamura expressed his intention to release the film in 2014.
