= List of horror films of 2004 =

A list of horror films released in 2004.

Horror films released in 2004
Title	Director	Cast	Country	Notes
12 Days of Terror	Jack Sholder	John Rhys-Davies, Colin Egglesfield	United States	Television film
Ab-normal Beauty	Oxide Pang Chun	Race Wong, Rosanne Wong, Anson Leung	Hong Kong	
Adam and Evil	Andrew Van Slee	Brody Harms, Erica Cerra, Barbara Kottmeier	United States	
Alien vs. Predator	Paul W. S. Anderson	Sanaa Lathan, Raoul Bova, Lance Henriksen	United States	
Anacondas: The Hunt for the Blood Orchid	Dwight H. Little	Johnny Messner, KaDee Strickland, Matthew Marsden	United States	
Art of the Devil	Thanit Jitnukul	Krongthong Ratchatawan, Trin Sethachoke, Nirut Sutjarit	Thailand	
Beyond the Wall of Sleep	Thom Maurer, Barrett Klausman		United States	
Blade: Trinity	David S. Goyer	Wesley Snipes, Kris Kristofferson, Jessica Biel	United States	
Blessed	Simon Fellows	James Purefoy, David Hemmings, Heather Graham	United States	
Bloodsucking Redneck Vampires	Joe Sherlock, Mike Hegg	Dee Alsman, Makayla Brown, Shannon Barksdale	United States	
Bone Sickness	Brian Paulin	Rich George, Kevin Barbare, Ruby Larocca	United States	
Boo	Anthony C. Ferrante	Jilon Ghai, Dig Wayne, Nicole Rayburn	United States	
Bunshinsaba	Byeong-ki Ahn	Kim Gyu-ri, Lee Se-eun, Lee Yuri	South Korea	
Calvaire	Fabrice Du Welz	Laurent Lucas, Philippe Nahon, Jackie Berroyer	Luxembourg; Belgium; France	
Cemetery Gates	Roy Knyrim	Reggie Bannister	United States	
Club Dread	Jay Chandrasekhar	Bill Paxton, Jay Chandrasekhar, Kevin Heffernan	United States	Comedy horror
Creep	Christopher Smith	Franka Potente, Vas Blackwood, Sean Harris	Germany; United Kingdom	
Cube Zero	Ernie Barbarash	Martin Roach, Stephanie Moore	United States	
The Curse of El Charro	Rich Ragsdale	Andrew Bryniarski, Danny Trejo, Heidi Androl	United States	Direct-to-video
Curse of the Komodo	Jay Andrews	J.P. Davis, Gail Harris, Ted Monte	United States	
Dark Harvest	Paul Moore	Don Digulio, Jessica Dunphy	United States	
Dawn of the Dead	Zack Snyder	Sarah Polley, Ving Rhames, Jake Weber	United States	
Dead Birds	Alex Turner	Henry Thomas, Patrick Fugit, Nicki Lynn Aycox	United States	
Deuteronomium - Der Tag des jüngsten Gerichts	Roger Grolimund	Denise Meili, Tobias Durband, Samuel Binkert, Mario Scarpellini	Switzerland	Direct-to-video
Dead & Breakfast	Matthew Leutwyler	Ever Carradine, Brent David Fraser, Gina Philips	United States	
Dead Friend	Kim Tae-gyeung	Kim Ha-neul, Nam Sang-mi, Ryu Jin	South Korea	
Dead Meat	Conor McMahon	Anthony Litton	Ireland	
DinoCroc	Kevin O'Neill	Costas Mandylor, Charles Napier, Matthew Borlenghi	United States	
Dracula 3000	Darrell Roodt	Casper Van Dien, Erika Eleniak, Coolio	Germany; South Africa	
Evil Remains	James Merendino	Maryam d'Abo, Daniel Gillies, Will Rokos	United States	
Exorcist: The Beginning	Renny Harlin	Stellan Skarsgård, Izabella Scorupco, James D'Arcy	United States	
The Eye 2	Oxide Pang Chun, Danny Pang	Shu Qi, Eugenia Yuan, Jesdaporn Pholdee	Hong Kong; Thailand	
Face	Yoo Sang-gon	Shin Hyun-joon	South Korea	
The Family That Eats Soil	Khavn	Jocelyn Sibayan, Gigi Duque, Kristine Kintana	Philippines	
Fear of Clowns	Kevin Kangas	Jacky Reres	United States	
Feng Shui	Chito Roño		Philippines	
First Love	Matteo Garrone	Michela Cescon, Vitaliano Trevisan	Italy	Sex horror
A Four Course Meal	Clay Liford	Ilram Choi, Haley Ramm, Tamarah Murley	United States	
Frankenfish	Mark A.Z. Dippé	Muse Watson, Mark Boone, Jr., Reggie Lee	United States	
Freak Out	Christian James	James Heathcote, Dan Palmer	United States	Horror comedy
Gargoyle	Jay Andrews	Michael Paré, Petri Roega, Kate Orsini	Romania; United States	
Ghost Game	Joe Knee	Alexandra Barreto, Shelby Fenner	United States	
Ghost Lake	Jay Woelfel	Damian Maffei, Tatum Adair, Gregory Lee Kenyon	United States	Direct-to-video
Ginger Snaps 2: Unleashed	Brett Sullivan	Emily Perkins, Katharine Isabelle	Canada	
Ginger Snaps Back: The Beginning	Grant Harvey	Katharine Isabelle, Emily Perkins	Canada	
Glass Trap	Fred Olen Ray	Stella Stevens, C. Thomas Howell	United States	
Godsend	Nick Hamm	Greg Kinnear, Rebecca Romijn	United States; Canada	
Goreinvasión	Germán Magariños		Argentina	
The Grudge	Takashi Shimizu	Sarah Michelle Gellar, Jason Behr, William Mapother	United States	
Guardian of the Realm	Ted Smith	Tanya Dempsey, Glen Levy	United States	
H6: Diary of a Serial Killer	Martín Garrido Barón	Antonio Mayans, Raquel Arenas, Ángel Alarcón	Spain	
Hair High	Bill Plympton		United States	Comedy horror
Half-Caste	Sebastian Apodaca	Kathy Wagner, Robert Pike Daniel, Kim te Roller	South Africa	
The Halfway House	Kenneth J. Hall	Mary Woronov, Saye Yabandeh, Janet Tracy Keijser	United States	
The Hazing	Rolfe Kanefsky	Brad Dourif, Parry Shen, Jeremy Maxwell	United States	
Hellbent	Paul Etheredge-Ouzts	Dylan Fergus, Nick Name, Andrew Levitas	United States	
Hellboy	Guillermo del Toro	Ron Perlman, Doug Jones, Selma Blair	United States	
Hell's Gate 11:11	Michael Bafaro	Paul Dzenkiw, Laura Mennell, Kristina Copeland	Canada	
Hide and Creep	Chance Shirley, Chuck Hartsell	Barry Austin, Chris Garrison, Tony Boyd	United States	
Hunting Creatures	Andreas Pape	Christian Engelmann, Oliver Kellisch, Boris Hansmann	Germany	
Infection	Masayuki Ochiai	Kōichi Satō, Mari Hoshino, Masanobu Takashima	Japan	
Jack O'Lantern	Ron McLellen	Dave R. Watkins, Tracy Yarkoni, Kevin L. Powers	United States	
Ju-Rei: The Uncanny	Koji Shiraishi	Chinatsu Wakatsuki, Eriko Kazuto, Mirai Ueno	Japan	
Kakurenbo			Japan	
Kill the Scream Queen	Bill Zebub	Deborah Dutch, Kerri Taylor, Rachel DeGenaro	United States	
Madhouse	William Butler	Natasha Lyonne, Jordan Ladd, Lance Henriksen	United States	
The Mailman	Tony Mark	Rob Arbogast, Collene Taylor, Bryan W. Lukasik	United States	
Malevolence	Stevan Mena	Samantha Dark, R. Brandon Johnson, Courtney Bertolone	United States	
Marebito	Takashi Shimizu	Shinya Tsukamoto, Tomomi Miyashita	Japan	
Murder-Set-Pieces	Nick Palumbo	Tony Todd, Gunnar Hansen, Cerina Vincent	United States	
Off the Beaten Path	Jason Stephenson	Jessie Welsch, Carrie Sizemore, Tommy Thompson	United States	
One Missed Call	Takashi Miike	Kou Shibasaki, Shinichi Tsutsumi, Kazue Fukiishi	Japan	
Premonition	Norio Tsuruta	Noriko Sakai, Hiroshi Mikami, Maki Horikita	Japan	
Punk Rock Holocaust	Doug Sakmann	Lloyd Kaufman, Kevin Lyman, Heather Vantress	United States	
Puppet Master vs Demonic Toys	Ted Nicolaou	Vanessa Angel, Corey Feldman, Silvia Šuvadová	United States	
R-Point	Kong Su-chang	Kam Woo-sung, Son Byong-ho, Oh Tae-gyeong	South Korea	
Resident Evil: Apocalypse	Alexander Witt	Milla Jovovich, Sienna Guillory, Oded Fehr	United States	
Riding the Bullet	Mick Garris	Jonathan Jackson, David Arquette, Cliff Robertson	United States	
Ring of Darkness	David DeCoteau	Ryan Starr, Mink Stole, Irina Voronina	United States	
The Risen	Brandon Bethmann, Eric Szmyr	Tony Grocki, Sue-Ellen Bethmann, Conor Grocki	United States	
Romasanta	Paco Plaza	Julian Sands, Elsa Pataky, John Sharian	Spain	
Saint Ange	Pascal Laugier	Virginie Ledoyen, Marie Herry, Catriona MacColl	Romania; France	
Santeria: The Soul Possessed	Benny Mathews	Nito Perez Jr., Rico Thurwalker, Maria Fonseca Sotolongo	United States	
SARS Wars	Taweewat Wanta	Tep Pho-Ngam, Supakorn Kitsuwon, Somlek Sakdikul	Thailand	
Satan's Little Helper	Jeff Lieberman	Alexander Brickel, Katheryn Winnick, Amanda Plummer	United States	Horror comedy
Saw	James Wan	Leigh Whannell, Cary Elwes, Danny Glover	United States	
Scarred	Jon Hoffman, Dave Rock		United States	Direct-to-video
Seed of Chucky	Don Mancini	Brad Dourif, Jennifer Tilly, Billy Boyd	United States	
Shallow Ground	Sheldon Wilson	Timothy V. Murphy, Stan Kirsch, Rocky Marquette	United States	
Shaun of the Dead	Edgar Wright	Simon Pegg, Kate Ashfield, Nick Frost	United Kingdom	
Shutter	Banjong Pisanthanakun, Parkpoom Wongpoom		Thailand	
The Sisterhood	David DeCoteau	Michelle Borth, Storm David Newton, Kate Plec	United Kingdom; United States	
Skeleton Man	Johnny Martin	Jackie Debatin, Robert Miano, Michael Rooker	United States	
Spectres	Phil Leirness	Marina Sirtis, Alexander Agate, Lauren Birkell	United States	
Spider Forest	Song Il-gon	Kam Woo-sung, Suh Jung, Kang Kyeong-heon	South Korea	
Suburban Nightmare	Jon Keeyes	Brandy Little, Kimberly Grant, Farah White	United States	
Tales from the Crapper	Chris Seaver, Lloyd Kaufman, Gabriel Friedman, Chad Ferrin, Dave Paiko, Brian Spitz, Lloyd Kaufman	Eli Roth, Ted Raimi, Ron Jeremy	United States	Comedy horror
Terkel in Trouble	Kresten Vestbjerg, Andersen Thorbjørn Christoffersen, Stefan Fjeldmark, Ray Gillon	Anders Matthesen, Kim Matthesen	Denmark	Animated musical
They Came Back	Robin Campillo	Géraldine Pailhas, Jonathan Zaccaï, Frédéric Pierrot	France	
The Thing Below	Jim Andrews	David Richmond-Peck, Jim Thorburn, Julie Hill	United States	
Three... Extremes	Fruit Chan, Takashi Miike, Park Chan-wook	Bai Ling, Miriam Yeung, Tony Leung Kar-Fai	Japan; Thailand; South Korea; Hong Kong	
To Catch a Virgin Ghost			South Korea	
Toolbox Murders	Tobe Hooper	Angela Bettis, Juliet Landau, Sheri Moon	United States	
Tremors 4: The Legend Begins	S. S. Wilson	Michael Gross, Billy Drago, August Schellenberg	United States	Comedy horror
Twisted Illusions 2	Joel D. Wynkoop		United States	
Unseen Evil 2	Jeff Leroy	Priscilla Barnes, Lorenzo Lamas, Shilo May	United States	Direct-to-video
Van Helsing	Stephen Sommers	Hugh Jackman, Kate Beckinsale, Richard Roxburgh	United States	
Werewolf Warrior	Tomo'o Haraguchi	Miki Tanaka, Nozomi Andō, Masatō Ibu	Japan	
Zombie Honeymoon	David Gebroe	Graham Sibley, Tracy Coogan, David M. Wallace	United States	
