= List of Japanese films of 2004 =

== Highest-grossing films ==
Rank	Title	Gross
1	Crying Out Love in the Center of the World	¥8.50 billion
2	Be with You	¥4.80 billion
3	Pokémon: Destiny Deoxys	¥4.38 billion
4	Doraemon: Nobita in the Wan-Nyan Spacetime Odyssey	¥3.05 billion
5	Detective Conan: Magician of the Silver Sky	¥2.80 billion

== List of films ==
A list of films released in Japan in 2004 (see 2004 in film).

Title	Director	Cast	Genre	Notes
2LDK	Yukihiko Tsutsumi	Maho Nonami	Thriller	
Appleseed	Shinji Aramaki			
Abaranger vs. Hurricanger				
Be with You	Nobuhiro Doi	Yūko Takeuchi, Shido Nakamura	Drama	
Beyblade: Fierce Battle				
Casshern	Kazuaki Kiriya	Yusuke Iseya, Kumiko Asō, Toshiaki Karasawa	Science fiction	
Crayon Shin-chan: The Storm Called: The Kasukabe Boys of the Evening Sun	Tsutomu Mizushima		—N/a	
Cutie Honey	Hideaki Anno	Eriko Sato, Mikako Ichikawa, Jun Murakami	Science fiction	
Dark Tales of Japan	Masayuki Ochiai, Norio Tsuruta, Takashi Shimizu, Yoshiro Nakamura, Koji Shiraishi		Horror	Television film
Dead Leaves	Hiroyuki Imaishi			
Detective Conan: Magician of the Silver Sky	Taiichiro Yamamoto		—N/a	
Doraemon: Nobita in the Wan-Nyan Spacetime Odyssey	Tsutomu Shibayama		—N/a	
The Face of Jizo	Kazuo Kuroki	Rie Miyazawa, Yoshio Harada, Tadanobu Asano	Drama, History	
Ghost in the Shell 2: Innocence	Mamoru Oshii		Science fiction	
Godzilla: Final Wars	Ryuhei Kitamura	Masahiro Matsuoka, Rei Kikukawa, Kazuki Kitamura	Science fiction	
Half a Confession	Kiyoshi Sasabe	Akira Terao; Mieko Harada		Japan Academy Prize for Best Film
Hana and Alice	Shunji Iwai	Anne Suzuki, Yū Aoi, Tomohiro Kaku	—N/a	
Howl's Moving Castle	Hayao Miyazaki		Fantasy	
Infection	Masayuki Ochiai	Kōichi Satō, Michiko Hada, Yōko Maki	Horror	.
Inuyasha the Movie: Fire on the Mystic Island	Toshiya Shinohara		—N/a	
Izo	Takashi Miike	Mickey Curtis, Daisaku Akino, Chisato Amate	Action	
Ju-Rei: The Uncanny	Koji Shiraishi	Chinatsu Wakatsuki, Miku Ueno, Eriko Ichinohe	Horror	
Kamen Rider Blade: Missing Ace				
Kamikaze Girls	Tetsuya Nakashima	Kyoko Fukada, Anna Tsuchiya	Comedy	
Konjiki no Gash Bell!!: 101 Banme no Mamono				
Lunch Box	Shinji Imaoka	Yumika Hayashi	Pink	Best Film, Pink Grand Prix
Mind Game	Masaaki Yuasa		Fantasy	
Marebito	Takashi Shimizu	Shinya Tsukamoto, Tomomi Miyashita, Kazuhiro Nakahara	Horror	
Naruto the Movie: Ninja Clash in the Land of Snow	Tensai Okamura			
Naruto - Konoha Sports Festival	Hayato Date			
Nin x Nin: Ninja Hattori-kun, the Movie	Masayuki Suzuki	Kazuyuki Asano, Mikihisa Azuma, Yuri Chinen		
Nobody Knows	Hirokazu Koreeda	Yūya Yagira	Drama	
One Piece the Movie: Curse of the Sacred Sword				
Pokémon: Destiny Deoxys	Kunihiko Yuyama		—N/a	
Premonition	Tsuruta Norio	Hiroshi Mikami, Noriko Sakai, Hana Inoue	Horror	
Saint Seiya: Heaven Chapter ~ Overture				
Steamboy	Katsuhiro Otomo		Science fiction	
Survive Style 5+	Gen Sekiguchi	Vinnie Jones, Tadanobu Asano, Reika Hashimoto		
Swing Girls	Shinobu Yaguchi	Juri Ueno, Yuta Hiraoka, Shihori Kanjiya	Comedy	
The Taste of Tea	Katsuhito Ishii		Comedy-drama	
Three... Extremes	Fruit Chan, Takashi Miike, Park Chan-wook	Miriam Yeung, Lee Byung-hun, Kyōko Hasegawa	Horror	Hong Kong-South Korean-Japanese co-production
Tony Takitani	Jun Ichikawa	Issey Ogata, Rie Miyazawa, Takahumi Shinohara	Drama	
Ultraman: The Next	Kazuya Konaka			
Vital	Shinya Tsukamoto	Tadanobu Asano, Nami Tsukamoto	Drama	
Yu-Gi-Oh! The Movie: Pyramid of Light	Hatsuki Tsuji			
Zebraman	Takashi Miike	Atsuro Watabe, Teruyoshi Uchimura, Yui Ichikawa	Comedy	

== See also ==
- 2004 in Japan
- 2004 in Japanese television

== Footnotes ==
=== Bibliography ===
- Galbraith IV, Stuart (2008). The Toho Studios Story: A History and Complete Filmography. Scarecrow Press. ISBN 978-1461673743.
- Kalat, David (2007). J-horror: The Definitive Guide to The Ring, The Grudge and Beyond. Vertical. ISBN 978-1932234084.
