= List of horror films of 1999 =

A list of horror films released in 1999.

Horror films released in 1999
Title	Director	Cast	Country	Notes
Addicted to Murder 2: Tainted Blood	Kevin J. Lindenmuth	Susan Little, Cloud Michaels, Sarah K. Lippmann	United States	
Alien Blood	Jon Sorensen	Shirley Clarke, Rebecca Stirling, Penelope Dudley	United States	
Apocalypse II: Revelation	Andre van Heerden	Jeff Fahey, Nick Mancuso, Carol Alt	United States; Canada	
The Astronaut's Wife	Rand Ravich	Johnny Depp, Charlize Theron, Nick Cassavetes, Samantha Eggar	United States	
Audition	Takashi Miike	Ryo Ishibashi, Eihi Shiina, Miyuki Matsuda	Japan	
Bats	Louis Morneau	Lou Diamond Phillips, Dina Meyer, Bob Gunton	United States	
The Blair Witch Project	Daniel Myrick, Eduardo Sanchez	Heather Donahue, Michael Williams, Joshua Leonard	United States	
Camp Blood	Brad Sykes	Jennifer Ritchkoff, Michael Taylor, Tim Young, Betheny Zolt	United States	
Candyman: Day of the Dead	Turi Meyer	Tony Todd, Nick Corri	United States	Third film in the Candyman series Direct-to-video
Children of the Corn 666: Isaac's Return	Kari Skogland	John Franklin, Stacy Keach	United States	Direct-to-video
Deep Blue Sea	Renny Harlin	Thomas Jane, Saffron Burrows, Samuel L. Jackson	United States	
Desecration	Dante Tomaselli	Irma St. Paule	United States	
End of Days	Peter Hyams	Arnold Schwarzenegger, Gabriel Byrne, Robin Tunney	United States	
An Eye for an Eye	Atro Lahtela	Meri Nenonen, Jani Volanen	Finland	
Fantom Kiler 2	Roman Nowicki	Eliza Borecka, Andrej Jass, Magda Szymborska	Poland	
Fear Runs Silent	Serge Rodnunsky	Billy Dee Williams, Suzanne Davis	United States	Direct-to-video
From Dusk Till Dawn 2: Texas Blood Money	Scott Spiegel	Robert Patrick, Bo Hopkins	United States	Direct-to-video
Gemini	Shinya Tsukamoto	Masahiro Motoki, Ryo, Yasutaka Tsutsui	Japan	
The Haunting	Jan de Bont	Liam Neeson, Catherine Zeta-Jones, Owen Wilson	United States	
The Haunting of Hell House	Mitch Marcus	Colm O'Maonlai, Ciaran Davies, Brian Glanney	United States	
Hellblock 13	Paul Talbot	Gunnar Hansen, Jasi Cotton Lanier, Debbie Rochon	United States	Direct-to-video
House on Haunted Hill	William Malone	Geoffrey Rush, Famke Janssen, Taye Diggs	United States	Film remake
The Hypnotist	Masayuki Ochiai	Goro Inagaki	Japan	
I, Zombie: The Chronicles of Pain	Andrew Parkinson	Ellen Softley, Dean Sipling	United Kingdom	
Ice from the Sun	Eric Stanze	D. J. Vivona, Ramona Midgett	United States	
Idle Hands	Rodman Flender	Seth Green, Devon Sawa, Elden Henson	United States	Horror comedy
The Item	Dan Clark	Dan Clark, Dave Pressler	United States	
The Killer Eye	Richard Chasen	Jacqueline Lovell, Jonathan Norman, Costas Koromilas, Nanette Bianchi	United States	Produced by Charles Band
Knocking on Death's Door	Mitch Marcus	Brian Bloom, Kimberly Rowe, David Carradine, William Hickey	United States	
Kolobos	Daniel Liatowitsch, David Todd Ocvirk	Amy Weber, Donny Terranova	United States	
Lake Placid	Steve Miner	Bill Pullman, Bridget Fonda, Brendan Gleeson	United States	
Lovers Lane	Jon Ward	Erin Dean, Riley Smith, Sarah Lancaster, Anna Faris	United States	
Lycanthrope	Bob Cook	Robert Carradine, Michael Winslow	United States	
Mutation	Marc Fehse, Timo Rose	Mark Door, Juliane Block, Andreas Schnaas	Germany	
The Nameless	Jaume Balagueró	Emma Vilarasau, Karra Elejalde, Tristan Ulloa	Spain	
Nightworld: Survivor	David Straiton	Clé Bennett, Lawrence Bayne, Kurtys Kidd	Canada	
Rage of the Werewolf	Kevin J. Lindenmuth	Debbie Rochon, Joe Zaso, Sarah K. Lippmann	United States	
The Rage: Carrie 2	Katt Shea	Emily Bergl, Eli Craig, Jason London	United States	
Ravenous	Antonia Bird	Guy Pearce, Robert Carlyle, Jeffrey Jones	United States	
Red Room	Daisuke Yamanouchi	Yuuki Tsukamoto, Mayumi Ookawa, Sheena Nagamori	Japan	
Resurrection	Russell Mulcahy	Christopher Lambert, Barbara Tyson, David Cronenberg	United States	
Retro Puppet Master	Joseph Tennent	Greg Sestero, Brigitta Dau	United States	
Ring 2	Hideo Nakata	Miki Nakatani, Hitomi Sato, Kyoko Fukada	Japan	
The Ring Virus	Kim Dong-bin	Shin Eun-kyung, Jung Jin-young	South Korea	
Shark Attack	Bob Misiorowski	Casper Van Dien, Jenny McShane, Ernie Hudson	Ireland; South Africa; United States	Television film
Shikoku	Shunichi Nagasaki	Yui Natsukawa, Michitaka Tsutsui, Chiaki Kuriyama	Japan	
Sleepy Hollow	Tim Burton	Johnny Depp, Christina Ricci, Miranda Richardson	United States	
Stigmata	Rupert Wainwright	Patricia Arquette, Gabriel Byrne, Nia Long	United States	
Stir of Echoes	David Koepp	Kevin Bacon, Kathryn Erbe, Illeana Douglas	United States	
Terror Firmer	Lloyd Kaufman	Will Keenan, Jasi Cotton Lanier, Alyce LaTourelle	United States	
Titanic 2000	John Paul Fedele	Zachary Winston Snygg, Jasi Cotton Lanier, Jacob Bogert	United States	
Tomie	Ataru Oikawa	Miho Kanno, Mami Nakamura	Japan	
Totem	David DeCoteau	Alicia Lagano, Sacha Spencer, Marissa Tait	United States	
Troublesome Night 5	Herman Yau	Louis Koo, Simon Lui, Law Lan, Wayne Lai	Hong Kong	
Troublesome Night 6	Herman Yau	Louis Koo, Amanda Lee, Belinda Hamnett	Hong Kong	
Virus	John Bruno	Jamie Lee Curtis, William Baldwin, Donald Sutherland	United States	
Warlock III: The End of Innocence	Eric Freiser, Ashley Laurence	Bruce Payne	United States	Direct-to-video
A Wicked Ghost	Tony Leung Hung-Wah	Francis Ng, Gigi Lai, Gabriel Harrison, Edward Mok, Nelson Ngai, Celia Sze	Hong Kong	
Wild Zero	Tetsuro Takeuchi	Guitar Wolf	Japan	
Wishmaster 2: Evil Never Dies	Jack Sholder	Andrew Divoff	United States	Direct-to-video
Witchcraft	Hrafn Gunnlaugsson	Hilmir Snær Guðnason, Sara Dögg Ásgeirsdóttir, Alexandra Rapaport	Iceland	Folk horror
Witchouse	David DeCoteau	Matt Raftery, Monica Serene Garnich, Airauna Albright	United States	
Zelyonyy slonik	Svetlana Baskova	Aleksandr Maslaev, Anatoly Osmolovsky, Sergei Pakhomov, Vladimir Epifantsev	Russia	
