= J-Horror Theater =

2004–2010 is an anthology of 6 Japanese horror films

J-Horror Theater (Jホラーシアター, J horā shiatā) (2004–2010) is an anthology of 6 Japanese horror films produced by Takashige Ichise (一瀬 隆重, ichise takashige). Spurred by the overwhelming success of Ringu リング (1998), six filmmakers – Masayuki Ochiai 落合正幸, Norio Tsuruta 鶴田 法男, Takashi Shimizu 清水 崇, Kiyoshi Kurosawa 黒沢 清, Hideo Nakata 中田 秀夫, Hiroshi Takahashi 高橋 洋 – were requested to create a horror film to be released under Ichise's J-Horror Theater anthology.

== Films ==
=== Infection (2004) ===
Infection (感染, kansen), Dir. Masayuki Ochiai (落合正幸, ochiai masayuki)

Original Japanese release date: 2 October 2004. Officially released in theaters as a double feature with Premonition and on DVD as part of the J-Horror Theater series.

=== Premonition (2004) ===
Premonition (予言, yogen) Dir. Norio Tsuruta (鶴田 法男, tsuruta norio)

Original Japanese release date: 2 October 2004. Officially released in theaters as a double feature with Infection and on DVD as part of the J-Horror Theater series.

=== Reincarnation (2006) ===
Reincarnation (輪廻, rin'ne) Dir. Takashi Shimizu ( 清水 崇, shimizu takashi)

Official Japanese release date: 7 January 2006. Originally screened at the Tokyo International Film Festival in October 2005. Officially released in Japanese theaters as part of the J-Horror Theater series. It was then released on DVD and in US theaters as part of the After Dark Horrorfest (also known as 8 films to Die For) in 2006.

=== Retribution (2007) ===
Retribution (叫, sakebi) Dir. Kiyoshi Kurosawa (黒沢 清, kurosawa kiyoshi)

Official Japanese release date: 24 February 2007, Originally screened at the Venice Film Festival in September 2006. Was not officially released as a J-Horror Theater entry.

=== Kaidan (2007) ===
Kaidan (怪談, kaidan) Dir. Hideo Nakata (中田 秀夫, nakata hideo)

Original Japanese release date: 4 August 2007. Was not officially released as a J-Horror Theater entry.

=== Kyōfu (2010) ===
Kyōfu (恐怖, kyōfu) also known as The Sylvian Experiments Dir. Hiroshi Takahashi (高橋 洋, takahashi hiroshi)

Original Japanese release date: 10 July 2010. Officially released as part of the J-Horror Theater series and is the final film instalment. It holds significance as the film is directed and produced by the pair responsible for Ringu that began the J-Horror Theater anthology.

The official Kyōfu trailer also suggests that Kaidan and Sakebi were part of the series, as at the beginning it shows clips from all 5 films with their release dates, 2004–2007, followed by the Kyôfu preview.
