= Reincarnation (film) =

- Theatrical release poster
- Directed by: Takashi Shimizu
- Screenplay by: Takashi Shimizu; Masaki Adachi
- Produced by: Takashige Ichise
- Starring: Yūka; Karina; Kippei Shiina; Tetta Sugimoto
- Cinematography: Takahide Shibanushi
- Edited by: Noboyuki Takahashi
- Music by: Kenji Kawai
- Production companies: Oz Co.; Entertainment Farme; Tokyo Broadcasting System
- Distributed by: Toho
- Release dates: October 2005 (Tokyo Film Festival); 7 January 2006 (Japan)
- Running time: 95 minutes
- Country: Japan
- Language: Japanese
- Box office: $4.3 million

Reincarnation (輪廻, Rinne) is a 2005 Japanese horror film, directed by Takashi Shimizu. It centers on a hopeful actress who won a role in a film that takes her, the cast, and the crew to a hotel where the present soon collides with the past.

It was released as a part of the six-volume J-Horror Theater.

== Plot ==
In 1970, Professor Norihasa Omori visits a local hotel and films himself killing 11 of the hotel guests, employees, and his own children before committing suicide, all as part of his wish to understand reincarnation. The footage of the murders disappears.

35 years later, horror movie director Ikuo Matsumura decides to make a film about the massacre. As the shoot draws near, Nagisa Sugiura, the actress set to star as Omori's daughter Chisato, is haunted by the ghosts of the victims. She begins hallucinating and is plagued by nightmares of the killings. She discovers an old film camera similar to the one Omori used.

College student Yayoi Kinoshita meets Yuka Morita, an actress who had auditioned for Ikuo's movie. Yuka says she remembers things from a "past life" and shows Yayoi a birthmark that looks like evidence of strangulation. Ghosts later drag Yuka away. Yayoi's research takes her to the only survivor of the massacre: Omori's wife, Ayumi. She explains that Omori had become obsessed with the idea that the body is just a vessel.

During filming, Nagisa starts hallucinating. Her agent reviews the camera, which consists of the film Omori took as he committed the murders. As this film plays, Nagisa reenacts the events in her hallucination. She witnesses the actors, including Yayoi and Ikuo, and the two men at the start of the movie, transform into the people they portray. With the victims walking toward her, she escapes and runs into town. Simultaneously, her agent watches the film of this escape from Omori's POV. Nagisa finds herself cornered in a store and grabs a piece of glass to kill herself. She looks at her reflection and sees Omori's face. Her agent watches Omori in his film, revealing Nagisa's reflection instead of his own in the glass before he cuts his own throat. Nagisa starts to reenact Omori's suicide, but the doll stops her to tell her they will be together forever.

A group of executives watches Nagisa take. Among them is Ayumi. Near the end, Nagisa collapses, shaking and screaming as crew members come to her aid. The professor's wife has her two children, and she smiles. Sometime later, in a mental ward, Nagisa is bound in a full-body wrap and still haunted by the souls of Omori's children. Ayumi looks at her through the door window, then passes her children's favorite toys to Nagisa: a red ball and a doll. Nagisa screams but eventually calms down with a sinister smile as the ghosts of the children close in on her.

== Cast ==
- Yūka as Nagisa Sugiura
- Karina Nose as Yayoi Kinoshita
- Kippei Shiina as Ikuo Matsumura
- Tetta Sugimoto as Tadashi Murakawa
- Marika Matsumoto as Yuka Morita
- Shun Oguri as Kazuya Onishi
- Mantaro Koichi as Producer Yamanaka
- Atsushi Haruta as Norihasa Omori
- Miki Sanjo as Ayumi Omori
  - Younger version portrayed by Tomoko Mochizuki
- Mao Sasaki as Chisato Omori
- Hiroto Ito as Yuya Omori
- Takako Fuji as Takako Sudo (Hotel Maid)
- Shinji Nomura as Naoto Takada (Hotel Owner)
- Yuki Shiomi as Yuta Inomata (Receptionist)
- Izumi Kyoko as Kaoru Shintani (Hotel Maid 2)
- Yasutoki Furuya as Atsushi Ozawa (Waiter, Chef)
- Harada as M. Okuno (Guest)
- Yoshiko Nishi as Nao Okuno (Guest)
- Hiroshi Ishimaru as Taichi Hayami (Guest)
- Kayoko Toda as Yoko Takeuchi (Guest)

== Release ==
The film was released as part of producer Takashige Ichise's J-Horror Theater series along with Infection, Premonition, and Retribution, among others.

Reincarnation premiered at the 18th Tokyo International Film Festival in October 2005. Reincarnation was distributed theatrically by Toho on January 7, 2006. The film was released by Lionsgate on November 18, 2006 in the United States.

It was theatrically released in the United States as one of the eight films in the nationwide film festival After Dark Horrorfest, which ran November 17 through 21, 2006.

== See also ==
- List of ghost films

== Notes ==
=== References ===
- Galbraith IV, Stuart (2008). The Toho Studios Story: A History and Complete Filmography. Scarecrow Press. ISBN 978-1461673743.
