= Retribution (2006 film) =

- Film poster
- Directed by: Kiyoshi Kurosawa
- Written by: Kiyoshi Kurosawa
- Produced by: Takashige Ichise
- Starring: Kōji Yakusho; Manami Konishi; Riona Hazuki; Tsuyoshi Ihara; Joe Odagiri; Ryo Kase
- Cinematography: Akiko Ashizawa
- Edited by: Nobuyuki Takahashi
- Music by: Kuniaki Haishima
- Distributed by: Avex Entertainment; Xanadeux Company
- Release dates: September 3, 2006 (Venice); February 24, 2007 (Japan)
- Running time: 104 minutes
- Country: Japan
- Language: Japanese

Retribution (Japanese: 叫, Hepburn: Sakebi) is a 2006 Japanese horror-mystery film written and directed by Kiyoshi Kurosawa, and starring Kōji Yakusho as a detective whose investigation of serial murders leads him to a mysterious woman in red that slowly draws him into the darkness.

The film had its world premiere at the Midnight Out of Competition section of the 63rd Venice International Film Festival on 3 September 2006. It was theatrically released in Japan on 24 February 2007.

== Plot ==
Yoshioka, an experienced detective, investigates the murder of an unknown woman in a red dress. She was drowned on the Tokyo waterfront, but an autopsy reveals that her stomach is full of seawater. Moreover, all the clues that he finds relate to himself: a button found at the murder scene matches one that is missing from his own coat, and fingerprints found match his own. Yoshioka realizes that the only viable suspect is himself, but he does not remember a thing.

A ghost in a red dress soon starts appearing to him. As these apparitions become more intense and bizarre, similar murders occur with people killing loved ones for small infractions. All the perpetrators are found by Yoshioka as he searches for clues about the original murder. Eventually, the drowned woman is identified. Yoshioka visits her parents, only to find that she had a boyfriend who was extorting her parents, and who happens to visit the house at the same time. He quickly confesses to the crime.

Yoshioka is visited by the ghost again who reveals that she is not the murdered woman, but the ghost of a woman whom he saw in the window of an asylum 15 years ago who has died. All of the murderers took the ferry past the same asylum. Yoshioka sends his girlfriend away, afraid of what he might do to her. He goes to the asylum, where the woman in red agrees to forgive him for not helping her 15 years ago. He goes home, only to discover that he murdered his girlfriend six months ago. Going insane, he tries to forget. He collects the bones, and goes to the asylum to pick up the ghost's bones. His partner arrives at his apartment and finds the empty bowl that Yoshioka used to commit the murder. The ghost stalks him in the background. As an earthquake occurs, the bowl is now filled with water. The ghost suddenly appears above him and dives down dragging them both into the bowl. The film ends with Yoshioka walking in the street holding a bag containing his girlfriend's and the ghost's bones, with the ghost repeatedly saying: "I am dead. So please, I want everyone to die too".

== Cast ==
- Kōji Yakusho as Noboru Yoshioka
- Manami Konishi as Harue Nimura
- Riona Hazuki as F18
- Tsuyoshi Ihara as Toru Miyaji
- Joe Odagiri as Dr. Takagi
- Ryo Kase as Sailor
- Hiroyuki Hirayama as Young detective Sakurai
- Ikuji Nakamura as Shoichi Sakuma
- Kaoru Okunuki as Miyuki Yabe
- Hironobu Nomura as Seiji Onoda

== Release ==
The film was released as part of producer Takashige Ichise's J-Horror Theater series along with Infection, Premonition, and Reincarnation, among others.

== Reception ==
Adam DiLeo of IGN gave Retribution a mixed review, saying that the films is worth seeing despite it is not on par with Kiyoshi Kurosawa's previous films such as Cure and Bright Future. Derek Elley of Variety praised Kōji Yakusho's performance, saying he "makes an ideal protagonist, one with whom the audience is never quite sure whether it can identify".

As the ghost of the film is seeking revenge from past events of which every protagonist is apparently responsible, the horror in Retribution has been seen by some as expressing some kind of social illness and collective guilt in our contemporary world.
