= Dark Tales of Japan =

2004 Japanese horror film anthology

- DVD cover
- Directed by: Yoshihiro Nakamura; Masayuki Ochiai; Takashi Shimizu; Kōji Shiraishi; Norio Tsuruta
- Written by: Yoshihiro Nakamura; Masayuki Ochiai; Takashi Shimizu; Kōji Shiraishi; Katsuhide Suzuki; Naoya Takayama; Naoyuki Yokota; Toshiya Ohno
- Produced by: Jeremy Alter; Takashige Ichise; Takeshi Moriya; Toshinori Nishimae
- Starring: Kayoko Shiraishi; Shōzō Endō; Yoshinori Okada; Kanako Fukaura; Anri Sugihara
- Music by: Henning Lohner
- Production companies: @Movie Japan K.K.; Oz Company; TBS
- Release date: September 22, 2004 (Japan)
- Running time: 92 minutes
- Country: Japan
- Language: Japanese

Dark Tales of Japan (Japanese: 日本のこわい夜, Hepburn: Nihon no Kowai Yoru) is a 2004 made-for-TV film anthology of five short horror stories, directed by five notable Japanese film directors, which are told through a mysterious old lady in kimono on a late-night bus travelling on a long isolated mountain road.

== Plot summary ==
=== Introduction: Would You Like to Hear a Scary Tale? ===
Introduction: Would You Like to Hear a Scary Tale? (Intorodakushon: Kowai hanashi, kikitai desu ka) Directed by Yoshihiro Nakamura; teleplay by Yoshihiro Nakamura and Katsuhide Suzuki

At a bus stop near Twilight Cemetery, an elegant old lady gets on a late-night bus. She turns to the bus driver and asks "Would you like to hear a scary tale?" He refuses, but she pointedly shares a tale of a bus driver who has a ghostly experience with an okiku doll during one night. At end of her tale, she looks at the camera and asks "How about you? Would you like to hear a scary tale?"

In each episode, the old lady shares a bus-related scary story with a different passenger before introducing the main story to the viewer.

- Kayoko Shiraishi - Old Lady in Kimono
- (uncredited) - bus driver

=== Episode 1: The Spiderwoman ===
The Spiderwoman (くも女, Kumo Onna) Directed by Yoshihiro Nakamura; teleplay by Yoshihiro Nakamura

Two magazine reporters pursue a story about a local legend of a Spider Woman. Though the magazine's circulation has shot up 20% following their dramatic articles, they have yet to find a single shred of evidence backing up their stories. Then they hear about a young girl who claims to have been attacked by the monster.

- Shōzō Endō - Yamazaki
- Yoshinori Okada - Hasegawa
- Miyako Yamaguchi - Editor
- Kanako Fukaura - Tomoko
- Anri Sugihara - Akemi, schoolgirl
- Yōko Maki - schoolgirl

=== Episode 2: Crevices ===
Crevices (すきま, Sukima) Directed by Norio Tsuruta; teleplay by Naoya Takayama.

Visiting the apartment of a missing friend, a young man is startled to find every crack and crevice of the apartment's interior sealed with red tape. Upon reviewing computer and video files, it appears his friend suffered from some sort of mental breakdown wherein he was completely obsessed with the terror that someone was watching him. But how could the friend have simply disappeared? As he and the apartment manager set out to remove the massive amount of red tape, very strange things begin to occur.

- Shunsuke Nakamura - Kodera
- Shigenori Yamazaki - Shimizu
- Kyūsaku Shimada - Apartment manager

=== Episode 3: The Sacrifice ===
The Sacrifice (大生首, Ōnamakubi) Directed by Kōji Shiraishi; teleplay by Kōji Shiraishi and Naoyuki Yokota

A young woman returns to her rural home from Tokyo to tend to her ailing mother. Once there, she realizes that her troubles with a co-worker stalker may have followed her to her family home. Haunted by childhood memories and the growing fear of the obsessed co-worker, she wakes in the middle of the night and discovers a terrifying sight.

- Yu Yamada - Mayu Ooki
- 野原可歩 - Mayu Ooki (child)
- Moro Morooka - Toshinori Ooki
- Megumi Asaoka - Shizuko Ooki
- Seminosuke Murasugi - Fukuda

=== Episode 4: Blonde Kwaidan ===
Blonde Kwaidan (金髪怪談, Kinpatsu Kaidan) Directed by Takashi Shimizu; teleplay by Takashi Shimizu.

A Japanese film executive, visiting Hollywood for the first time, is looking forward to meeting authentic blondes. However, there may be one blonde in particular who is too much for him.

- Tetta Sugimoto - Yoshio Ishiguro

=== Episode 5: Presentiment ===
Presentiment (予感, Yokan) Directed by Masayuki Ochiai; teleplay by Masayuki Ochiai and Toshiya Ōno.

After committing the perfect act of embezzlement, a Japanese businessman boards the elevator to make his escape. Riding with him are three unusual passengers, who slowly reveal how much they know about him and what he has done. When the elevator suddenly breaks down, his real terror begins while he's trapped with his strange company inside the elevator and the police outside.

- Teruyuki Kagawa - Shigenori Fukawa
- Hijiri Kojima - Woman in hat

=== Conclusion: Would You Like to Hear a Scary Tale? ===
Would You Like to Hear a Scary Tale? (Kowai hanashi, kikitai desu ka) Directed by Yoshihiro Nakamura; teleplay by Yoshihiro Nakamura and Katsuhide Suzuki

The old lady shares another bus-related story with a young bus passenger. At end of her tale, she reveals herself as a ghost, which terrifies the schoolgirl and the bus driver into abandoning the bus. The old lady smiles at their running into the night, and looks at camera and says "That's all the scary tales for tonight. Sweet dreams."

- Kayoko Shiraishi - Old Lady in Kimono as Narrator
- Yoshiyuki Morishita - bus driver
- Risa Sasaoka - schoolgirl

== Notes ==
Produced by Ring and Ju-On: The Grudge producer Ichise Taka (credited as Ichise Takashige) for the Tokyo Broadcasting System and broadcast at 9PM on 22 September 2004, through a weekly TBS show: Wednesday Première: Best J-Horror in the World TV Special: Frightening Night of Japan (水曜プレミア 世界最恐JホラーSP日本のこわい夜; Suiyō puremia: Sekai saikyō J-Horā SP: Nihon no Kowai yoru).

Dark Tales of Japan DVD was released through Geneon Entertainment K.K. (Japan) on 1 April 2005; Genius Entertainment (US) on 25 October 2005, and Anchor Bay Entertainment UK's Dark Asia on 27 February 2006. All instances of Would You Like to Hear a Scary Tale? are omitted from VHS and DVD versions in the English-language market.
