= Keisuke Matsuoka =

Japanese novelist

- Born: December 3, 1968 (age 57); Inazawa, Aichi, Japan
- Occupation: Novelist
- Writing career
- Genres: Mystery and thriller
- Notable works: Saimin; Detective vs Detectives; A Scandal in Japan

Keisuke Matsuoka (松岡 圭祐, Matsuoka Keisuke) (born December 3, 1968, in Inazawa, Aichi Prefecture) is a Japanese novelist. His first novel, the psycho-thriller Saimin (Hypnosis) sold over a million copies on its release in 1997 and has been adapted into a film of the same name by Masayuki Ochiai. His sophomore release of Senrigan (Clairovoyance) about a Air Self-Defense Force fighter pilot turned clinical psychologist launched a popular series, which have achieved combined sales of over six and a quarter million books. He is author of the nine-volume Banno Kanteishi Q no Jikenbo (The Case Files of All-Round Appraiser Q) series, and the Tantei no Tantei (Detective vs Detectives) series, also adapted into a television series of the same name by Fuji TV.

Matsuoka is best known outside of Japan for his Sherlock Holmes pastiche, A Scandal in Japan, which has been translated into English by James Balzer. The novel explores the time between Holmes' alleged death at Reichenbach Falls and his reappearance in London three years later.

== Novels ==
- Saimin (Hypnosis) (1997) - Kadokawa
- Senrigan (jp:千里眼シリーズ) (Clairovoyance) (1999) - Kadokawa
- Magician (2002) - Kadokawa
- The Melancholy of Mickey Mouse (2005) - Shinchosha
- Aoi Hitomi and Nuage (2007) - Kadokawa
- Banno Kanteishi Q no Jikenbo (jp:Qシリーズ) (The Case Files of All-Round Appraiser Q) (2010) - Kadokawa
- Tantei no tantei (jp:探偵の探偵) (Detective vs Detectives) (2014) - Kodansha
- Mizukagami suiri (Water Mirror Detective) (2015) - Kodansha
- Shaarokku Homuzu tai Ito Hirobumi (Sherlock Holmes: A Scandal in Japan) (2017) - Kodansha
- Songbun (2019) - Kadokawa

== Film and television ==
- Saimin (1999) - Toho
- Senrigan (2000) - Toei
- All-Round Appraiser Q: The Eyes of Mona Lisa (2013) - Toho
- Detective versus Detectives (jp:探偵の探偵) (2015) - Fuji TV
