= Half Caste (disambiguation) =

Half-caste are people of mixed ethnicity.

Half Caste may also refer to:

- Half Caste (horse), the winner of the 1859 Grand National Steeplechase
- "Half Caste" (poem), a poem by John Agard
- Half-Caste (film), a 2004 horror film
- Half-Caste Act 1886 (title in Victoria), or Aborigines Protection Act 1886 (title in Western Australia)
