= Dark Water (short story collection) =

1996 short story collection by Koji Suzuki

- Author: Koji Suzuki
- Original title: From the Depths of Dark Waters (仄暗い水の底から, Honogurai mizu no soko kara)
- Language: Japanese
- Genre: Horror
- Publication date: 1996
- Publication place: Japan
- Media type: Print

Dark Water is the English title of a collection of short stories by Koji Suzuki, originally published in Japan as Honogurai mizu no soko kara (Kanji: 仄暗い水の底から; literally, From the Depths of Dark Waters). The book was first published in 1996 and released in 2004 in an English translation.

The collection contains seven stories, and an extra plotline forming the prologue and epilogue.

== Stories ==
- "Floating Water" (浮遊する水; Fuyū Suru Mizu) was adapted as Dark Water (2002) by Hideo Nakata, which in turn was remade as the American film Dark Water (2005). It is the story of a young mother and her daughter who take refuge from a messy divorce in a run-down apartment building. The mother discovers that a small girl vanished from the building a year previously, and begins to investigate the connection between her disappearance and a series of terrifying events taking place around the flat.
- "Solitary Isle" - a young man sets out to discover the truth behind his dead friend's boast that he dumped his girlfriend naked on Battery No. 6, an artificial island in the middle of Tokyo Bay. In 2006, The Hollywood Reporter announced George A. Romero would write and direct a film based on the short story.
- "The Hold" - a fisherman who beats his wife and son and tries to uncover the reason for his wife's disappearance, and why he has a throbbing headache.
- "Dream Cruise"' - a young man is invited out on a mini-cruise by a couple who wish to entice him into a pyramid sales scheme. Fairly soon, bizarre things start happening to the boat. Dream Cruise was adapted for the Masters of Horror Showtime cable network series in 2007 and was directed by Tsuruta Norio.
- "Adrift" - the crew of a fishing trawler happen across an abandoned yacht, similar in situation to the Mary Celeste. The film Open Water 2: Adrift (2006) was partly influenced by this short story. The film rights for this story have been optioned by MGM and Blumhouse Productions, with Darren Aronofsky set to direct and Jared Leto to star and produce the adaptation.
- "Watercolors" - an amateur dramatic troupe stages a play in a converted disco, but strange things start happening on the floor above.
- "Forest Under the Sea" - the only story in the collection to have no real supernatural element whatsoever. Two spelunkers discover an unexplored cave, but become trapped. Suzuki here explores the emotions of regret and longing. It ties in with the epilogue story.

== Themes ==
Suzuki is concerned with the atrocities committed by humans themselves rather than by otherworldly forces. There are themes of urban decay, family troubles and domestic abuse running throughout the stories. The characters themselves are often selfish, cruel and self-absorbed. Suzuki uses these characters to explore emotions such as rage, fear and longing. His stories often take as their theme life after the Japanese asset price bubble burst, as they were written shortly afterwards.

The one thing that all the stories have in common is the repeated use of water imagery. Many of the events take place at sea, but even the land-based plotlines have a connection to water. In Watercolors, for instance, the characters are plagued by water dripping through their ceiling. While it's generally believed that water drips through the ceiling in Floating Water, this is not true; this was just an element put into the films.

== Manga ==
- Dark Water

仄暗い水の底から (Honogurai mizu no soko kara)
- Genre: Drama, horror, psychological
- Manga
- Written by: Koji Suzuki
- Illustrated by: Meimu
- Published by: Kadokawa Shoten
- English publisher: NA: ADV Manga
- Published: 2004

Dark Water (仄暗い水の底から, Honogurai mizu no soko kara; "In the depths of dark water") is a manga version of Koji Suzuki's book Dark Water from 2002, illustrated by Meimu. Just like the book, it's a collection of short horror stories linked to water.
