= Yoshino Kimura =

British-Japanese actress (born 1976)

- 木村 佳乃
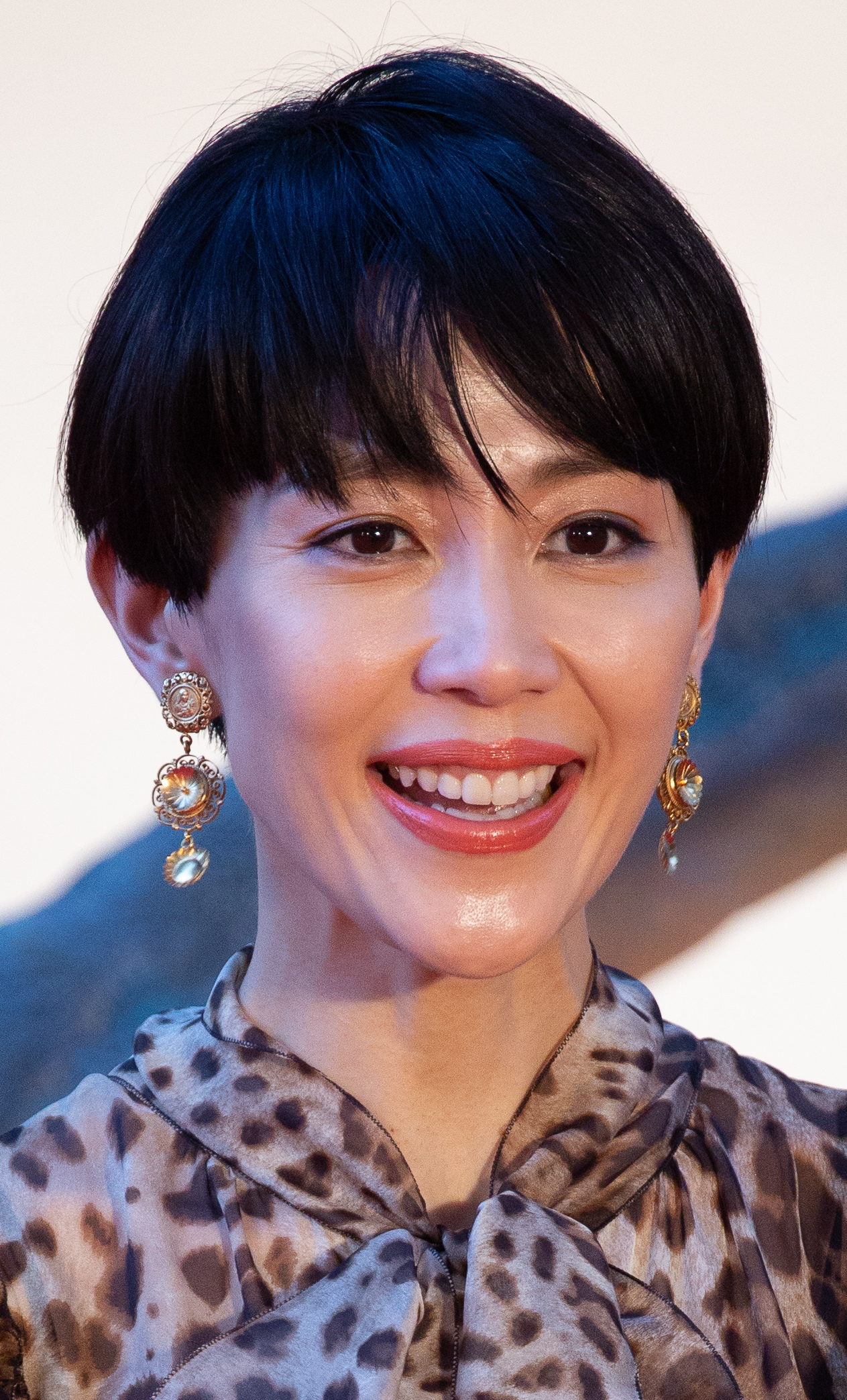
- Kimura in 2018
- Born: 10 April 1976 (age 50); London, England
- Occupations: Actress; voice actress; singer
- Years active: 1996–present
- Agent: TOP COAT
- Spouse: Noriyuki Higashiyama (m. 2010)
- Children: 2
- Musical career
- Genre: J-pop
- Instrument: Vocals
- Label: Pony Canyon

Yoshino Kimura (木村 佳乃, Kimura Yoshino; born 10 April 1976) is a British-born Japanese actress and singer. She appeared on an episode of the Showtime series Masters of Horror. She is known for her starring roles as Chika in the drama film Lost Paradise (1997) and as Shizuka in the action western film Sukiyaki Western Django (2007).

Kimura won the "Rookie of the Year" prize at the 21st Japan Academy Awards for her appearance in Shitsurakuen.

== Early life ==
Kimura was born on 10 April 1976, in London, England, but grew up in Setagaya, Tokyo. Kimura also lived in New York City for three years because of her father's job. She attended the Department of English Literature and Art at Seijo University but did not graduate.

== Career ==
Kimura appeared as Shizuka in the 2007 spaghetti-western Sukiyaki Western Django. As of 25 June 2007, she was slated to star in a new Japanese soap opera to be set in Australia. Kimura also voiced Master Tigress in the Japanese dub of Kung Fu Panda and Kung Fu Panda 2. She also appears in Blindness as the First Blind Man's Wife. On 24 October 2010, she married Noriyuki Higashiyama.

In 2007, Kimura took the titular role in the TV Asahi tanpatsu (単発, TV movie) Teresa Teng Monogatari (テレサ・テン物語), portraying the late Taiwanese superstar, who was and continues to be popular throughout Asia.

She played Kazusa Monzen and Aoi Monzen in the 2008 film Orochi: Blood.

She also voiced Claire Folley in the video game Professor Layton and the Unwound Future.

== Filmography ==
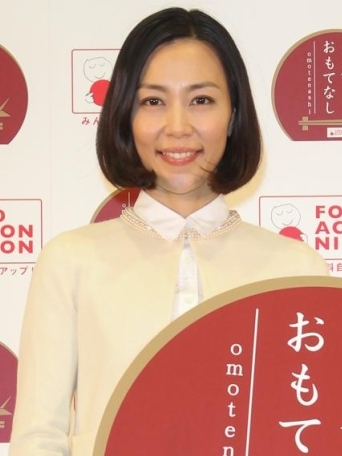
Kimura in 2014

Key
†	Denotes films that have not yet been released

=== Film ===
Year	Title	Role	Notes	Ref.
1997	Lost Paradise	Chika		
2000	Isola		Lead role	
2001	Hashire! Ichirō			
2002	Mobōhan	Shigeko Maehata		
2002	Her Island, My Island	Kuriko	Lead role	
2003	Like Asura	Keiko Akagi		
2005	Ichigo no Kakera			
2005	Bluestockings	Kiyoko		
2005	The Samurai I Loved	Fuku		
2006	A Hardest Night!!	Shigeko		
2006	Backdancers!	Reiko Mihama		
2006	Sakuran	Takao		
2007	Glory to the Filmmaker!	Akiko		
2007	Densen Uta	Ranko Kaburagi		
2007	Sukiyaki Western Django	Shizuka		
2008	Fine, Totally Fine	Akari Kinoshita		
2008	Aibō the Movie	Hinako Katayama		
2008	Orochi: Blood	Aoi Monzen, Kazusa Monzen	Lead role	
2008	Jirochô Sangokushi	Osono		
2008	Blindness	First Blind Man's Wife	English-language film	
2008	Daremo Mamotte Kurenai	Reiko Onoue		
2008	Rescue Wings	Mina Takasu		
2009	Killer Bride's Perfect Crime	Fukuko Kobayashi		
2010	Confessions	Yuko Shimomura		
2010	King Game	Yamazaki		
2013	Aibō Series X DAY	Hinako Katayama		
2014	Hot Road	Kazuki's mother		
2015	Hoshigaoka Wonderland	Sawako Kiyokawa		
2016	Desperate Sunflowers	Natsuko Kotani		
2017	Pretty Cure Dream Stars!	Shizuku (voice)		
2018	My Dad is a Heel Wrestler	Shiori		
2019	Hit Me Anyone One More Time	President of the United States		
2019	Yo-kai Watch Jam the Movie: Yo-Kai Academy Y - Can a Cat be a Hero?	Medusa (voice)		
2020	The Legacy of Dr. Death: Black File	Megumi Hinamori		
2021	Kiba: The Fangs of Fiction	Yuriko Enami		
2021	First Love	Akina Hijiriyama		
2021	Masquerade Night	Machiko Sono		
2023	The Boy and the Heron	Natsuko (voice)		
2025	Re/Member: The Last Night			
2026	You, Like a Star	Shiho Inoue		

=== Japanese dub ===
==== Live-action ====
Year	Title	Role	Voice-over for	Notes	Ref.
2010	Percy Jackson & the Olympians: The Lightning Thief	Medusa	Uma Thurman		
2014	Paddington	Millicent Clyde	Uma Thurman		
2015	Jurassic World	Claire Dearing	Bryce Dallas Howard		
2018	Jurassic World: Fallen Kingdom	Claire Dearing	Bryce Dallas Howard		
2019	Godzilla: King of the Monsters	Dr. Emma Russell	Emily Blunt		
2021	Jungle Cruise	Dr. Lily Houghton	Emily Blunt		
2023	Jurassic World Dominion	Claire Dearing	Bryce Dallas Howard		

==== Animation ====
Year	Title	Role	Notes	Ref.
2001	Atlantis: The Lost Empire	Princess Kida		
2006	Open Season	Beth		
2008	Kung Fu Panda	Master Tigress		
2011	Kung Fu Panda 2	Master Tigress		
2022	Turning Red	Ming Lee		

=== Television ===
- Shota no Sushi (1996), Saori Otori
- Hojo Tokimune (2001), Toko
- Remote (2002), Yuka Sasaki
- Aibō (2004), Hinako Katayama
- Masters of Horror (2007), Yuri Saito (Episode: "Dream Cruise" )
- Teresa Teng Monogatari (2007), Teresa Teng
- Tenchijin (2009), Oryō
- Nakanai to Kimeta Hi (2010), Yukiko Sano
- Asa ga Kita (2015), Soe Kushida
- Sanada Maru (2016), Matsu
- Hiyokko (2017), Miyoko Yatabe
- Home Sweet Tokyo (2017), Itsuki Jenkins
- Dokonimo nai Kuni (2018), Mariko Maruyama
- Reach Beyond the Blue Sky (2021), Hiraoka Yasu
- No Activity (2021–24), Misato Satomi
- Minami-kun ga Koibito!? (2024), Kaede
- The 19th Medical Chart (2025), Shiori Arimatsu

== Discography ==
=== Albums ===
- 1999.03.03 "One and Only"
- 2000.04.20 "Girl"
- 2001.09.19 "Lady -The Best of Yoshino Kimura-"

=== Singles ===
- 1998.06.17 "Iruka no Natsu"
- 1998.09.18 "Love and Life"
- 1999.01.20 "Hello myself"
- 1999.12.01 "Amenohi wa Futari de"
- 2000.03.17 "Koisuru Nichiyobi"
- 2000.09.06 "Lullaby for Grandmother-M Version-"

== Accolades ==
Year	Award	Category	Work	Result	Ref.
1998	22nd Elan d'or Awards	Newcomer of the Year	Herself	Won	
1998	21st Japan Academy Film Prize	Newcomer of the Year	Lost Paradise	Won	
2006	29th Japan Academy Film Prize	Best Actress	The Samurai I Loved	Nominated	
2011	53rd Blue Ribbon Awards	Best Supporting Actress	Confessions	Won	
2016	9th Tokyo Drama Awards	Best Supporting Actress	Boku no Yabai Tsuma	Won	
