= Totally Blonde =

2001 film by Andrew Van Slee

- DVD cover
- Directed by: Andrew Van Slee
- Written by: Andrew Van Slee
- Produced by: Andrew Van Slee
- Starring: Krista Allen, Maeve Quinlan, Michael Bublé
- Production company: Extraordinary Films Ltd.
- Release date: December 21, 2001
- Running time: 94 minutes
- Country: United States
- Language: English

Totally Blonde is a 2001 comedy film written and directed by Andrew Van Slee, and starring Krista Allen, Maeve Quinlan, and Michael Bublé. The musical soundtrack was released as the album Totally Bublé.

The airhead comedy was Bublé's second film, after a bit part as a singer in Duets (2000) starring Gwyneth Paltrow and Huey Lewis, and followed by a role as Hap in The Snow Walker (2003). The soundtrack, which was moderately successful, was soon followed by his first major label release Michael Bublé (2003).

== Plot ==
Brunette Meg Peters just cannot seem to find Mr. Right, until one day she bleaches her hair blonde. Men begin to swarm around, but none she feels is Mr. Right until she meets crooner Van (Michael Bublé) at a local club. The plot thickens when she also meets an old high-school friend, now a wealthy hunk (Brody Hutzler). Typical situations follow, such as a scene where she stands up Van for a date with Hutzler, and Van ends up making out with her girlfriend played by Maeve Quinlan. In the end, Meg is caught in a deadly car crash. Van and Liv Visit her in the Hospital, where Meg is distraught to discover from Van that they are about to get engaged. Meg reluctantly delves back into her work, returning to her own hair color. Three months later in Megs old apartment, Liv reveals that Van botched his own wedding to be with Meg. everything turns out alright with Meg and Van living happily ever after in Italy.

== Cast ==
- Krista Allen as Meg Peters
- Maeve Quinlan as Liv Watson
- Michael Bublé as Van Martin
- Brody Hutzler as Brad Wilson
- Mindy Sterling as Ramona
- Colin Mochrie as Vulcan / Agent / Comic / Drunk
- Charlene Tilton as Blonde School Director
- Michael Kagan as Alfred / Mountie / Minister
- D. C. Douglas as French Waiter / Douglas the Hotel Clerk

== Reception ==
One critic describes the film as a "fairly disastrous romantic comedy", but says that Bublé's music, written by Van Slee, helps redeem it, as does the generally likable cast.
