= Infection (2004 film) =

- Film poster
- Directed by: Masayuki Ochiai
- Screenplay by: Masayuki Ochiai
- Story by: Ryoichi Kimizuka
- Produced by: Takashige Ichise
- Starring: Kōichi Satō; Masanobu Takashima
- Cinematography: Hatsuaki Masui
- Edited by: Yoshifumi Fukazawa
- Music by: Kuniaki Haishima
- Production companies: Geneon Entertainment; Nikkatsu; Oz Co.; Tokyo Broadcasting System
- Distributed by: Toho
- Release date: October 2, 2004 (Japan)
- Running time: 98 minutes
- Country: Japan
- Language: Japanese

Infection (Japanese: 感染, Hepburn: Kansen) is a 2004 Japanese horror film directed by Masayuki Ochiai. The film is about a run-down hospital where a doctor's mistake unwittingly creates horrific consequences for the staff at the hospital. The film was adapted from Ochiai's earlier screenplay from Tales of the Unusual. On its release, the film was part of the six-volume J-Horror Theater series.

On its release in Japan, it was the second highest grossing film at the weekend box office, only being beaten by I Robot.

== Plot ==
At a run-down, understaffed hospital, Dr. Akiba refuses to admit a patient with a strange black rash and is alerted to a severe crisis in Room 3, where a burn victim dies, having been given the wrong drug. Akiba, Dr. Uozumi, and four nurses decide to cover up the cause of death and move the body to an unused room. The head nurse then discovers that the patient Akiba previously refused to admit has been left in the hallway and informs him.

However, when Akiba goes to check, he discovers that Doctor Akai has taken the patient and decides to study his symptoms; though he is still alive, his body mass is liquefying into green goo. Not knowing how much Akai knows about the events in Room 3, Akiba and the others reluctantly agree to help with the examination. Still, when they return to the patient's room, they find he has vanished and the head nurse unconscious.

The head nurse awakens and begins acting strangely while she bleeds green goo from her ears and eyes. The doctors realize they are at risk of infection and decide to put her on a bed and cover her with plastic in an attempt to limit the infection's spread. Soon after, the mean nurse finds the young nurse drawing blood on herself. Their conversation goes awry when the young nurse lets out a maniacal laugh and plunges two needles into her body, splattering the mean nurse with green goo.

While speaking with a patient he killed earlier, Uozumi is overcome with emotional guilt. Akiba walks in but finds Uozumi alone. His eyes turn white, and green goo starts seeping from him. Akiba panics and turns to find the mean nurse, now infected and covered in green goo, smiling and hanging upside down from the ceiling. After seeing the nurse giving her blood to the dead, burned patient and running into the infected head nurse, Akiba flees the room.

Akiba confronts Akai and accuses him of creating and spreading the virus. Akai denies this and explains that the infection is spread mentally, infecting the subconscious of its victims. He then urges Akiba to remember what happened in Room 3 earlier at night. Dr. Nakazono walks in to find Akiba talking to himself, forcing him to realize that he's been speaking with his reflection. He looks around and sees the corpses of the two nurses, who are dead and covered in blood with no green goo in sight. Soon, Dr. Nakazono realizes that the last few hours have all been a hallucination. Nakazono calls the police, as Akiba recalls the events in Room 3 and realizes that "Akai" was the burn patient. The same series of events is shown again, but with Akiba as the burn patient and Akai as Akiba, giving the order for the wrong drug, which massacres the entire staff.

The hospital is evacuated the following day as all of the staff, except Nakazono, are dead, and the police are searching for Akiba, who has disappeared. When Nakazono leaves the hospital, she sees all the red lights change to green and vice versa; panicking, she accidentally cuts her hand, and green blood pours out. A shot of a locker is seen in the room where the burn victim was kept. Someone inside the locker calls for help as green goo starts pouring out of it. The top of the locker opens, and Akiba's hand, covered in goo, reaches out before falling to the floor.

== Cast ==
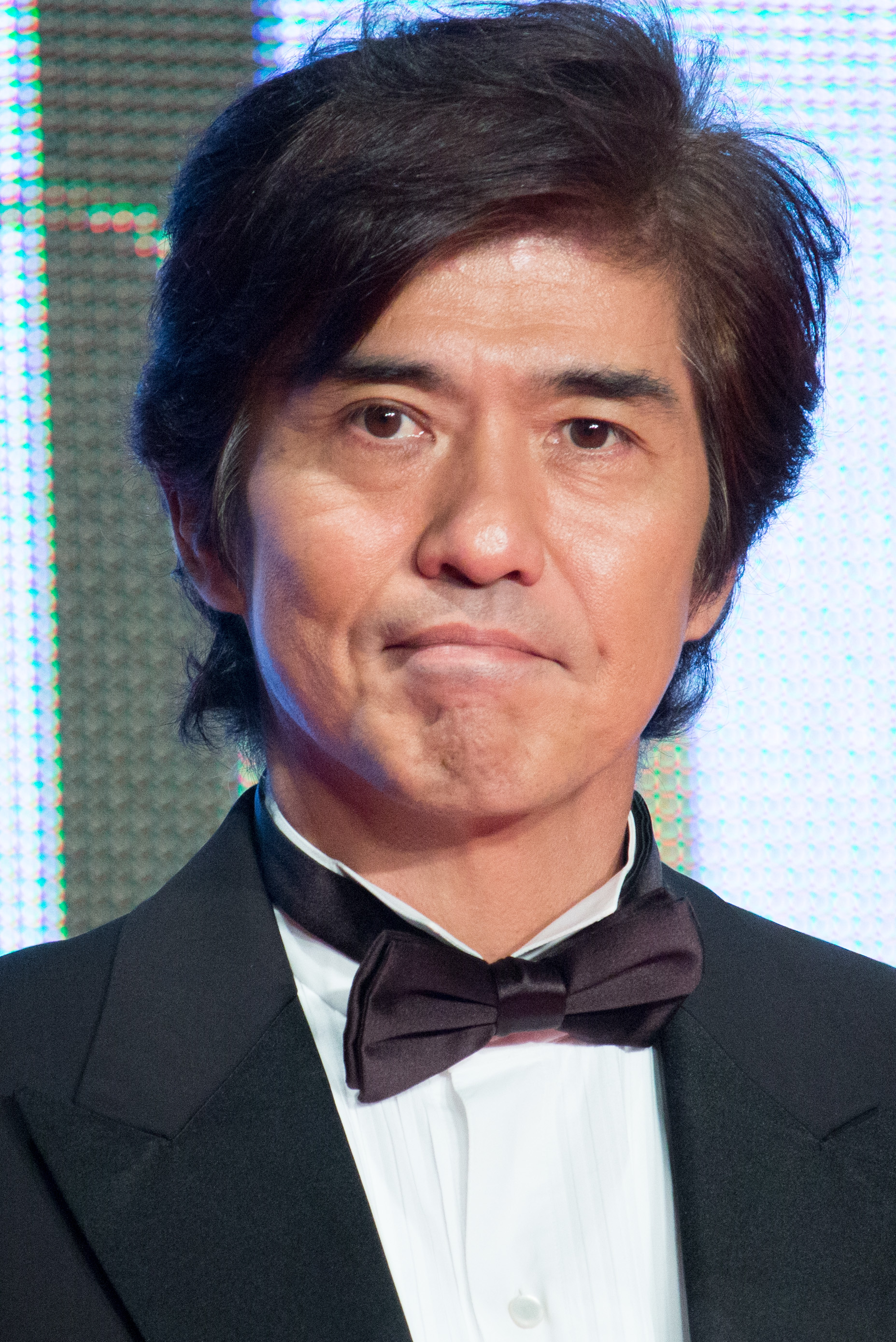
Kōichi Satō starred in the film as Dr. Akiba

Cast adapted from the book The Toho Filmography.

- Kōichi Satō as Dr. Akiba
- Michiko Hada as Dr. Nakazono
- Mari Hoshino as Rookie nurse
- Yōko Maki as the Mean nurse
- Shirō Sano as Dr. Kiyoshi Akai
- Tae Kimura as the Misuse nurse
- Masanobu Takashima as Dr. Uozumi
- Kaho Minami as Head nurse
- Moro Morooka as Dr. Kishida
- Isao Yatsu as a hospital patient

== Production ==
The film was part of Taka Ichise's announcement from May 14, 2004, where he announced his help in the creation of Entertainment FARM, which was the first Japanese company to provide financial backing for films. The company operated like an investment firm, focusing exclusively on films. Among their first productions, was Takashige Ichise's J-Horror Theater series, which Infection was part of. The series was a list of free-standing horror films directed by Masayuki Ochiai, Norio Tsuruta, Takashi Shimizu, Kiyoshi Kurosawa, Hideo Nakata and Hiroshi Takahashi.

Ochiai wrote the screenplay for Infection, which is an adaptation of one of his early scripts for a segment from Tales of the Unusual. Infection began production in April 2004.

== Release ==
Infection was released theatrically in Japan on October 2, 2004, where it was distributed by Toho. The film was released as a double feature with Premonition in Japan. In the film's opening week in Japan, it was the second highest film in the box office being only beaten by I, Robot. It grossed a total of $1,320,123 in its first week. The film grossed a total of $6,609,556 in Japan.

In the United States, the film was released directly to DVD by Lions Gate Films Home Entertainment on May 17, 2005.

== Reception ==
The Japan Times stated that Infection will "look familiar to J Horror fans" and resembled an episodes of The X-Files without Scully and Mulder. The review concluded that the director "stresses Grand Guignol atmospherics more, rational-sounding explanations less. His hospital breathes with a menace, madness and despair so pervasive that only a huge, obliterating explosion could bring escape -- in this life, at least." David Kalat (Video Watchdog) referred to the film as "a claustrophobic chamber piece" and "an overwhelming sensory experience that employs every cinematic trick in Ochiai's repertoire to establish a tone of intense dread." Sight & Sound gave the film a mixed review, opining that "after a fairly engrossing trawl through horror conventions, the film takes a reckless plunge into oneiric ambiguity that fails to provide satisfying closure" Sean Plummer writing in Rue Morgue stated that Infection "gets a bit messy towards the end" as "a major plot twist makes suspension of disbelief difficult" concluding that the film's "take on how a virus is transmitted is pretty original."

== See also ==
- List of horror films of 2004
- List of Japanese films of 2004
