= Orochi (manga) =

Japanese manga series

- First tankōbon volume cover

おろち
- Genre: Horror; Supernatural thriller
- Manga
- Written by: Kazuo Umezu
- Published by: Shogakukan; Akita Shoten
- English publisher: NA: Viz Media
- Imprint: Akita Sunday Comics
- Magazine: Weekly Shōnen Sunday
- Original run: June 15, 1969 – August 23, 1970
- Volumes: 6
- Live-action film
- Directed by: Norio Tsuruta
- Written by: Hiroshi Takahashi
- Released: September 20, 2008
- Runtime: 107 minutes
- icon

Orochi (おろち) is a Japanese manga series written and illustrated by Kazuo Umezu. It was serialized in Shogakukan's Weekly Shōnen Sunday from June 1969 to August 1970. It follows the story of Orochi, a woman with a young appearance and supernatural powers and how she observes people's lives and the consequences of their hidden actions. The story contains several varying elements such as paranormal and psychological themes.

In North America, it was licensed for an English language release by Viz Media.

== Plot ==
Orochi, a mysterious, ageless woman with supernatural abilities wanders through human society. Orochi has the power to erase or alter memories, making it possible for her to integrate herself into the lives of strangers as an observer. Each story is self-contained, focusing on ordinary individuals, often families, children, or marginalized figures, whose seemingly normal lives are disrupted by hidden secrets, psychological trauma, and supernatural occurrences. Orochi frequently encounters these individuals during moments of crisis, and her curiosity or pity leads her to intervene, sometimes subtly and sometimes directly. Her interventions often reveal dark truths about the characters, exposing familial abuse, repressed guilt, societal hypocrisy, and the violent potential lurking beneath everyday appearances.

== Development ==
Orochi was created during a prolific period in Kazuo Umezu's career following the success of Cat Eyed Boy (1967–68), which, like Orochi, used an anthology format connected through its observing protagonist. Scholar Akihiko Takahashi positioned Orochi within the evolution of Umezu's "horror manga" (恐怖マンガ, kyōfu manga), representing a shift toward more psychological terror and complex character studies in the late 1960s.

== Analysis and themes ==
Orochi is characterized by its focus on domestic horror, familial secrets, and the psychological underpinnings of fear. Critic Helen Chazan describes the series as exploring "the terror that the family could turn violent or be revealed as violent," with stories that frequently involve child abuse, parental cruelty, and the unraveling of domestic normalcy. Unlike the more monster-centric Cat Eyed Boy, Orochi often locates horror within the family itself, particularly along matrilineal lines. The opening stories, such as "Sisters" and "Bones," establish themes of hereditary tragedy, female rage, and resurrected patriarchal violence. The series explores Umezu's recurring idea that horror arises from the dissonance between idealized social roles (such as motherhood) and the brutal realities of human behavior.

Akihiko Takahashi discusses Orochi within the context of Umezu's "perspectivism", where the nature of horror is relative to the character's position. Orochi's detached, sometimes ambiguous interventions highlight how the same events can be seen as tragic, horrific, or even darkly comedic depending on the viewer's standpoint.

== Media ==
=== Manga ===
Written and illustrated by Kazuo Umezu, Orochi was serialized in Shogakukan's Weekly Shōnen Sunday from June 15, 1969, to August 23, 1970. Akita Shoten collected its chapters into six tankōbon volumes, released between April 23 and September 23, 1971. In 2005, Shogakukan re-released the series in a four-volume deluxe edition.

In North America, the manga was licensed for English release by Viz Media. Only one volume was published on September 5, 2002. In July 2021, Viz Media announced that they would re-publish the series in print and digital formats. The first volume was released on March 15, 2022.

=== Live-action film ===
In 2008, It was adapted into a live action film. The film features the following cast:

- Kazusa Monzen (played by Yoshino Kimura)
- Risa Monzen (played by Noriko Nakagoshi)
- Aoi Monzen (played by Yoshino Kimura)
- Orochi (played by Mitsuki Tanimura)
