= All-Round Appraiser Q: The Eyes of Mona Lisa =

- Film poster
- Directed by: Shinsuke Sato
- Written by: Manabu Uda
- Based on: All-Round Appraiser Q: Case IX by Keisuke Matsuoka
- Produced by: Atsuyuki Shimoda; Tamako Tsujimoto
- Starring: Haruka Ayase
- Cinematography: Taro Kawazu
- Edited by: Hitomi Kato
- Music by: Yuri Habuka; Takashi Omama
- Production company: Twins Japan
- Release date: 31 May 2014 (Japan)
- Running time: 119 minutes
- Country: Japan
- Language: Japanese
- Box office: ¥140 million (Japan)

All-Round Appraiser Q: The Eyes of Mona Lisa (Japanese: 万能鑑定士Q モナ・リザの瞳) is a 2014 Japanese crime mystery drama film directed by Shinsuke Sato.

== Cast ==
- Haruka Ayase
- Tori Matsuzaka
- Eriko Hatsune
- Pierre Deladonchamps
- Hiroaki Murakami
- Kazuya Kojima

== Reception ==
The film has grossed ¥140 million in Japan.

On Film Business Asia, Derek Elley gave the film a rating of 7 out of 10, calling it a "well-packaged deductive mystery-thriller".
