= Dream Cruise =

- Masters of Horror episode
- Episode no.: Season 2 Episode 13
- Directed by: Norio Tsuruta
- Written by: Norio Tsuruta; Naoya Takayama
- Based on: "Dream Cruise" by Koji Suzuki
- Original air date: February 2, 2007

Guest appearances
- Daniel Gillies; Ryo Ishibashi; Yoshino Kimura

Episode chronology
← Previous "The Washingtonians"	Next → —

"Dream Cruise" is the thirteenth and final episode of the second season (and of the whole TV series) of Masters of Horror, directed by Japanese director Norio Tsuruta. It is an adaptation of the 1996 short story "Dream Cruise" by Koji Suzuki. It was the series' second entry from Japan and the only feature length episode running 90 mins in its original cut. This was shortened to 60 minutes for its airing on Showtime. For its DVD release, it is restored to its full running time though the DVD box erroneously states it remains at 60 minutes.

== Plot ==
The episode starts with Jack Miller (Daniel Gillies), an American lawyer working in Tokyo, suffering from extreme nightmares about a childhood event in which his younger brother Sean (Ethan Amis) had died at sea. While trying to retrieve his baseball cap, which had been blown over the side of their rowing boat, Sean tipped the vessel over, throwing himself and Jack (Thomas Jones) into the water; and despite Jack's attempts to help him, Sean panicked and drowned. Since then Jack has been suffering from survivor's guilt because he feels his efforts to save Sean were only half-hearted.

Jack has fallen in love with Yuri (Yoshino Kimura), the wife of his most valued client, Eiji Saito (Ryo Ishibashi). Despite his deep-rooted fear of the sea, he reluctantly accepts Eiji's invitation to join the couple for a day trip to Tokyo Bay because Eiji allegedly has to work out a difficult legal matter with him; but it is gradually hinted that Eiji has become aware of Jack and Yuri's affair and is intending to kill them both. During the trip, Eiji's increasingly erratic behavior begins to worry Jack and Yuri, and finally Yuri reveals that Eiji had married her after his first wife, an emotionally unstable rich woman, had mysteriously disappeared.

When the boat's screw stalls, Eiji dives down to unblock it. But instead of seaweed, he finds it tangled with hair, which suddenly snares and drowns him. Yuri wants to leave him there, assuming he's dead. Jack, however, wants to try to save him and is appalled that Yuri doesn't want to help. Suddenly, Eiji reappears, soaked and alive. Things become strange when they can't seem to get hold of any of the other boats in the area, despite being in range, and the only voice coming from the radio is Sean's, calling Jack's name. When Eiji tries to kill Yuri, Yuri and Jack realize that Eiji is possessed by the vengeful spirit of Eiji's first wife, Naomi (Miho Ninagawa), who blames Yuri for her death.

Eiji knocks Jack out and imprisons Yuri in the bathroom. Jack is forced to fight a possessed Eiji and defeats him by stabbing him. Eiji falls apart and stumbles overboard. Jack hears Yuri crying out for help, but is stopped by Eiji's severed arm; and as he struggles with the limb, the bathroom of the boat begins to fill with water. As she is about to drown, Yuri receives a vision about what happened to Naomi: She had confronted Eiji, who told his wife that he had only married her for her inheritance. Naomi refused to let him divorce her or take her money; so Eiji killed her and dumped her body overboard, namely at the exact place he had stopped their boat on this trip.

Jack manages to free Yuri from her death trap, but they can't call for help because the radio has been destroyed. Yuri is suddenly possessed by Naomi and attacks Jack. Jack tries to slay Naomi with a hatchet, when Sean's spirit suddenly appears and stays his hand, revealing it to be a cruel illusion created by Naomi to trick Jack into killing Yuri. Pursued by Naomi, Yuri convinces Jack to overcome his fear and jump overboard. As the boat disappears in the distance, Yuri believes they have escaped, and she and Jack embrace in relief. Naomi reappears, trying to drag Yuri underwater; but Sean intervenes once again and takes the vengeful Naomi back to the bottom of the sea. The story ends with Jack now married to Yuri, finally free of his past with the knowledge that Sean has never blamed him for his death.

== Reception ==
Exclaim! wrote: "Unfortunately, the terror of Dream Cruise is lost in translation, with a clichéd, predictable plot and a monster that even horror-phobic North Americans will recognise as a typical Japanademon." Dread Central gave a rating of two out of five and said: "“Dream Cruise” gives us nothing more than a grab bag of clichés – a depressing end to a lackluster season."
