= Saimin (film) =

- Film poster
- Directed by: Masayuki Ochiai
- Screenplay by: Masayuki Ochiai; Yasushi Fukuda
- Based on: A novel by Keisuke Matsuoka
- Produced by: Touru Shibata; Toshiaki Harada
- Starring: Miho Kanno; Ken Utsui; Yukio Watanabe; Akira Shirai; Ren Osugi
- Cinematography: Osamu Fujiishi
- Edited by: Kazuo Miyauchi
- Music by: Kuniaki Hijima
- Production companies: Toho; Tokyo Broadcasting System
- Distributed by: Toho
- Release date: June 5, 1999 (Japan)
- Running time: 110 minutes
- Country: Japan
- Language: Japanese

Saimin (Japanese: 催眠; lit. Hypnosis), also released as The Hypnotist in the United States on DVD, is a 1999 Japanese horror film. The film is directed by Masayuki Ochiai and is based on a novel by Keisuke Matsuoka. A string of suicides prove to be linked. The death of a young athlete, a groom at his wedding and an elderly man celebrating his wife's birthday. All three of these males have mentioned a "green monkey" before their death. The psychologist Saga, played by Goro Inagaki investigates this case. A young psychiatrist teams up with him to formulate the theory that includes the element of hypnosis.

== Cast ==
- Goro Inagaki as Toshiya Saga
- Miho Kanno as Yuka Irie
- Takeshi Masu as Jissoji
- Ken Utsui as Sakurai
- Yuki Watanabe as Mitsui
- Shigemitsu Ogi as Kuraishi

== Production ==
Saimin is based on a novel by Keisuke Matsuoka. It was part of a series of novels written by Matsuoka, that were inspired by the attacks of Aum Shinrikyo in Japan. Director Masayuki Ochiai reflected on the attacks, stating that after it happened, bookstores grew with larger sections for spiritual material, noting "Today there has been a shift toward science. But as the religion fanatics were claiming that they alone held the truth, the science shows on TV display the same sense of all-knowing arrogance." Ochiai recalled he was contacted to work on Saimin by the company that published the novel. After reading it, Ochiai stated he enjoyed it but felt he "didn't think it was good enough to make into a movie." He met with the writer Keisuke Matsuoka to ask if he could make changes to the story as he felt he could make "more scary and perverse" uses of the theme of hypnotism.

Saimin was shot in eight weeks'. The opening scene of the film featuring a woman who works so hard her bones become exposed out of her skin was difficult to shoot. Ochiai stated that the makeup crew only built one prosthetic leg, and every time they shot it, something seemed wrong about it and had to wait each time for the make-up people to repair it, which took about 20 minutes. Ochiai recalled shooting the scene about 40 times.

== Release and aftermath ==
Saimin was released in Japan on June 5, 1999 where it was distributed by Toho. Saimin was released under the title The Hypnotist on August 4, 2001 by ADV Films. It was released in the United Kingdom under the title Hypnosis by Artsmagic on DVD in 2003.

The film was followed with a television series in Japan in 2000, which had Goro Inagaki reprising his role as Saga.

== Reception ==
From contemporary reviews, Jason Buchanan (AllMovie), stated that the film "ultimately succeeds thanks to its unusual ability to successfully pile on scare after scare." The review noted that although the story was not original, that the film stands out "when it comes to tone." Derek Elley (Variety) opined that the film was "a quality entry in the current spate of Japanese supernatural thrillers" and was "way superior to TV vet Ochiai's debut horrorfest, “Parasite Eve” (1997)." A review of the film in Fangoria described the film as "devilishly clever and suspenseful" and that "Ochiai has a precise visual style, full of elegant compositions and gorgeous photography [...] this movies is willing to take chances and delve deep into darker themes-so it's easy to forgive some of its half-baked digressions." Matt Buchanan of The Sydney Morning Herald found the film "gruesome, comic and flat-out-bizarre" stating that the film occasionally became "so very daft you will snap out of the quizzical trance the film inspires" and "being unable to work out why you're watching a film about Japanese citizens being trapped into suicide through post-hypnotic suggestion, you might just punch the cat. I know I did."

Saimin won the third prize for Best Asian film at the 1999 Fantasia Film Festival. It was beaten by Ring and Jin-Roh.

== See also ==
- List of Japanese films of 1999
- List of horror films of 1999

== Footnotes ==
=== References ===
- Buchanan, Matt (January 14, 2002). "Movies". The Sydney Morning Herald. p. 10.
- England, Norman (August 2000). "All Eyes on The Hypnotist". Fangoria. No. 195. ISSN 0164-2111.
- England, Norman (March 2008). "Shutter Speed". Fangoria. No. 271. ISSN 0164-2111.
- Galbraith IV, Stuart (2008). The Toho Studios Story: A History and Complete Filmography. Scarecrow Press. ISBN 978-1461673743.
- Kalat, David (2007). J-horror: The Definitive Guide to The Ring, The Grudge and Beyond. Vertical. ISBN 978-1932234084.
