= 2004 in Japanese television =

Events in 2004 in Japanese television.

== Debuts ==
Show	Station	Premiere Date	Genre	Original Run
Aim for the Ace!	TV Asahi	January 15	drama	January 15, 2004 – March 11, 2004
Daphne in the Brilliant Blue	CBC	January 15	anime	January 15, 2004 – June 30, 2004
Futari wa Pretty Cure	ABC TV	February 1	anime	February 1, 2004 – January 30, 2005
Get Ride! Amdriver	TV Tokyo	April 5	anime	April 5, 2004 – March 28, 2005
Bleach	TV Tokyo	October 5	anime	October 5, 2004 – March 27, 2012
GIRLS Bravo first season	Fuji TV	July 6	anime	July 6, 2004 – September 27, 2004
Genseishin Justirisers	TV Tokyo	October 2	tokusatsu	October 2, 2004 – September 24, 2005
Initial D Fourth Stage	Sky PerfecTV!	April 17	anime	April 17, 2004 – February 18, 2006
Kamen Rider Blade	TV Asahi	January 25	tokusatsu	January 25, 2004 – January 23, 2005
Kannazuki no Miko	Chiba TV	October 1	anime	October 1, 2004 – December 17, 2004
Legendz: Tale of the Dragon Kings	Fuji TV	April 4	anime	April 4, 2004 – March 27, 2005
Magical Girl Lyrical Nanoha	GBS	October 1	anime	October 1, 2004 – December 24, 2004
Mermaid Melody Pichi Pichi Pitch Pure	TV Tokyo	April 3	anime	April 3, 2004 – December 25, 2004
Paranoia Agent	WOWOW	February 2	anime	February 2, 2004 – May 18, 2004
Rockman EXE Stream	TV Tokyo	October 2	anime	October 2, 2004 – September 24, 2005
School Rumble	TV Tokyo	October 5	anime	October 5, 2004 – March 29, 2005
Sgt. Frog	TV Tokyo	April 3	anime	April 3, 2004 – April 2, 2011
Saiyuki RELOAD GUNLOCK	TV Tokyo	April 1	anime	April 1, 2004 – September 23, 2004
Suna no Utsuwa	TBS	January 18	drama	January 18, 2004 – March 28, 2004
Tokusou Sentai Dekaranger	TV Asahi	February 15	tokusatsu	February 15, 2004 – February 6, 2005
Tottoko Hamtaro: Ham Ham Paradise!	TV Tokyo	April 2	anime	April 2, 2004 – March 31, 2006
Transformers: Superlink	TV Tokyo	January 9	anime	January 9, 2004 – December 24, 2004
Tweeny Witches	NHK	April 9	anime	April 9, 2004 – March 4, 2005
Ultraman Nexus	CBC	October 2	tokusatsu	October 2, 2004 – June 25, 2005
Viewtiful Joe	TV Tokyo	October 2	anime	October 2, 2004 – September 24, 2005
Yu-Gi-Oh! Duel Monsters GX	TV Tokyo	October 6	anime	October 6, 2004 – March 26, 2008
Water Boys 2	Fuji TV	July 6	drama	July 6, 2004 – September 21, 2004

== Ongoing shows ==
- Music Fair, music (1964–present)
- Mito Kōmon, jidaigeki (1969–2011)
- Sazae-san, anime (1969–present)
- FNS Music Festival, music (1974–present)
- Panel Quiz Attack 25, game show (1975–present)
- Doraemon, anime (1979–2005)
- Soreike! Anpanman. anime (1988–present)
- Downtown no Gaki no Tsukai ya Arahende!!, game show (1989–present)
- Crayon Shin-chan, anime (1992–present)
- Shima Shima Tora no Shimajirō, anime (1993–2008)
- Nintama Rantarō, anime (1993–present)
- Chibi Maruko-chan, anime (1995–present)
- Detective Conan, anime (1996–present)
- SASUKE, sports (1997–present)
- Ojarumaru, anime (1998–present)
- One Piece, anime (1999–present)
- The Prince of Tennis, anime (2001–2005)
- Kitty's Paradise Fresh, children's variety (2002–2005)
- Pocket Monsters Advanced Generation, anime (2002–2006)
- Naruto, anime (2002–2007)
- Bobobo-bo Bo-bobo, anime (2003–2005)
- Konjiki no Gash Bell!!, anime (2003–2006)

== Endings ==
Show	Station	Ending Date	Genre	Original Run
Bakuryū Sentai Abaranger	TV Asahi	February 8	tokusatsu	February 16, 2003 – February 8, 2004
Chouseishin Gransazer	TV Tokyo	September 25	tokusatsu	October 4, 2003 – September 25, 2004
Daphne in the Brilliant Blue	CBC	June 30	anime	January 15, 2004 – June 30, 2004
Di Gi Charat Nyo	TV Tokyo	March 28	anime	April 6, 2003 – March 28, 2004
F-ZERO Falcon Legend	TV Tokyo	September 28	anime	October 7, 2003 – September 28, 2004
Fullmetal Alchemist	MBS	October 2	anime	October 4, 2003 – October 2, 2004
GIRLS Bravo first season	Fuji TV	September 27	anime	July 6, 2004 – September 27, 2004
InuYasha	Yomiuri TV	September 13	anime	October 16, 2000 – September 13, 2004
Kamen Rider 555	TV Asahi	January 18	tokusatsu	January 26, 2003 – January 18, 2004
Kannazuki no Miko	Chiba TV	December 17	anime	October 1, 2004 – December 17, 2004
Kimi ga Nozomu Eien	UHF Stations	January 4	anime	October 5, 2003 – January 4, 2004
Kochira Katsushika-ku Kameari Kōen-mae Hashutsujo	Fuji TV	December 19	anime	June 16, 1996 – December 19, 2004
Maburaho	WOWOW	April 6	anime	October 14, 2003 – April 6, 2004
Magical Girl Lyrical Nanoha	GBS	December 24	anime	October 1, 2004 – December 24, 2004
Mermaid Melody Pichi Pichi Pitch	TV Tokyo	March 27	anime	April 5, 2003 – March 27, 2004
Mermaid Melody Pichi Pichi Pitch Pure	TV Tokyo	December 25	anime	April 3, 2004 – December 25, 2004
Papuwa	TV Tokyo	March 30	anime	September 30, 2003 – March 30, 2004
Paranoia Agent	WOWOW	May 18	anime	February 2, 2004 – May 18, 2004
Pretty Guardian Sailor Moon	CBC	September 25	tokusatsu	October 4, 2003 – September 25, 2004
Rockman EXE Axess	TV Tokyo	September 25	anime	October 4, 2003 – September 25, 2004
Saiyuki RELOAD	TV Tokyo	March 25	anime	October 2, 2003 – March 25, 2004
Saiyuki RELOAD GUNLOCK	TV Tokyo	September 23	anime	April 1, 2004 – September 23, 2004
Sonic X	TV Tokyo	March 28	anime	April 6, 2003 – March 28, 2004
Suna no Utsuwa	TBS	March 28	drama	January 18, 2004 – March 28, 2004
Tottoko Hamtaro	TV Tokyo	March 26	anime	July 7, 2000 – March 26, 2004
Transformers: Superlink	TV Tokyo	December 24	anime	January 9, 2004 – December 24, 2004
Water Boys 2	Fuji TV	September 21	drama	July 6, 2004 – September 21, 2004
Yu-Gi-Oh! Duel Monsters	TV Tokyo	September 29	anime	April 18, 2000 – September 29, 2004

== See also ==
- 2004 in anime
- List of Japanese television dramas
- 2004 in Japan
- List of Japanese films of 2004
