= Premonition (2004 film) =

- Film poster
- Directed by: Norio Tsuruta
- Screenplay by: Norio Tsuruta; Noboru Takgi
- Based on: Kyoufu Shinbun by Jiro Tsunoda
- Produced by: Takashige Ichise
- Starring: Hiroshi Mikami; Noriko Sakai; Hana Inoue
- Cinematography: Naoki Kayano
- Edited by: Hiroshi Sunaga
- Music by: Kenji Kawai
- Production companies: A Fellah Pictures; Geneon Entertainment; Nikkatsu; Oz Co.; Tokyo Broadcasting System
- Distributed by: Toho
- Release date: October 2, 2004 (Japan)
- Running time: 95 minutes
- Country: Japan

Premonition (Japanese: 予言, Hepburn: Yogen) is a 2004 Japanese horror film directed by Tsuruta Norio. Yogen is based on the manga Kyoufu Shinbun ("Newspaper of Terror") by Jirō Tsunoda, serialized in Shōnen Champion in 1973. The film is about a man who discovers a newspaper that predicts the future.

The film was released as a double feature with Infection as part of Takashige Ichise's J-Horror Theater. The film received mixed reviews from The Japan Times and Video Watchdog.

== Plot ==
High-school teacher Hideki Satomi, his wife Ayaka who works as a psychology teacher, and their five-year-old daughter Nana are driving home to Tokyo after a vacation. While on a country road, Hideki stops to upload a file in a phone booth. Inside, he sees a newspaper scrap showing his daughter being involved in a car crash, dated just a minute later at 8:00 PM. As Ayaka steps outside to get Hideki's help on Nana's jammed seatbelt, a truck smashes through their car, killing Nana. A distraught Hideki tries to find the newspaper scrap in front of reporters while Ayaka tearfully tries to stop him.

Three years later, Ayaka, having divorced Hideki, interviews a psychic, Satoko Mikoshiba to learn more about the "Newspaper of Terror". After showing fear and reluctance, Mikoshiba tells Ayaka that a lawyer had once contacted her about the newspaper, but he disappeared soon after. At home, Ayaka receives a mysterious phone call from Mikoshiba and decides to visit her again. Inside, Ayaka finds several journals that archived newspapers that foreshadowed future accidents. She finds Mikoshiba lying dead and surrounded by polaroid photos. Grabbing a photo from Mikoshiba's hand, she quickly calls Hideki about the Newspaper of Terror, but he frantically cuts her off as he believes she still thinks he is insane.

Meanwhile, Hideki is haunted by premonitions and is restless whenever he sees any newspapers. A student of his, Sayuri Wakakubo who talks about something that could not be prevented, catches his attention. One night, Hideki sees a newspaper foreshadowing Wakakubo's death. He rushes to Wakakubo's home, but is too late to stop her from being stabbed to death by a lunatic. Meeting Ayaka, Hideki tells her about his student's death as well as his premonitions; they agree to team up to solve the case.

The two visit the house of Rei Kigata, a man who is reported to have researched the Newspaper of Terror. His house is deserted and covered with dirt. Finding a set of videotapes, they watch the first video dated thirteen years previously, in which Kigata explains that after receiving premonitions, he worked to prevent them, which, while saving people, caused his hand to mysteriously darken as a side effect. The 32nd video shows him covered in ashes and waving at the camera. Hideki and Ayaka eventually find what is left of his remains: a lump of ashes with a vague shape of a human body.

Hideki is uncertain whether he should let people die or save them at the cost of his own life, though Ayaka begs him not to. The two reaffirm their relationship and make love. The next day, Ayaka goes to work by train when her car breaks down, unknowingly leaving her phone inside. In Ayaka's apartment, Hideki sees a newspaper showing a train accident with more than 100 casualties, including Ayaka. He quickly follows Ayaka and manages to save her, but is unable to save everyone else, including Ayaka's friend Misato. Ayaka notices that Hideki's hand darkens as a side effect.

Planning to move in together with Ayaka, Hideki packs his belongings, but is confronted by visions of the victims of the accidents, including Misato, Wakakubo, Kigata, and Mikoshiba. Knowing that he cannot save both his wife and daughter as long as he is alive, Hideki flashes to the car accident and chooses to remain at his car which explodes shortly after he saved both Ayaka and Nana. A distraught Ayaka screams, while Nana sees the Newspaper of Terror dropping on her, revealing Hideki as the casualty of the car accident.

== Cast ==
- Hiroshi Mikami as Hideki Satomi
- Noriko Sakai as Ayaka Satomi
- Hana Inoue as Nana Satomi
- Maki Horikita as Sayuri Wakakubo
- Mayumi Ono as Misato Miyamoto
- Kei Yamamoto as Rei Kigata
- Kazuko Yoshiyuki as Satoko Mikoshiba

== Production ==
The film was part of Taka Ichise's announcement from May 14, 2004, where he stated his help in the creation of Entertainment FARM, which was the first Japanese company to provide financial backing for films. The company operated like an investment firm, focusing exclusively on films. Among their first productions, was Takashige Ichise's J-Horror Theater series, which Premonition was part of. The series was a list of free-standing horror films directed by Masayuki Ochiai, Norio Tsuruta, Takashi Shimizu, Kiyoshi Kurosawa, Hideo Nakata and Hiroshi Takahashi.

Premonition is based on Jiro Tsunoda's manga The Newspaper of Terror. Producer Takashige Ichise adapted the basic concept from the manga but developed a new plot for the film. Over the span of two years, Ichise, Tsuruta and Noboru Takagi rewrote and revised the script. Tsunoda initially disliked the script, opining that the film did not represent his manga, but reportedly softened on this view after seeing a completed product.

== Release ==
Premonition was released theatrically in Japan on October 2, 2004, where it was distributed by Toho. The film was released as a double feature with Infection in Japan. In United States it was released by Lions Gate Films. The film was released on DVD on July 12, 2005.

== Reception ==
Mark Schilling (The Japan Times) compared the film to Ring and One Missed Call, but stated that the premise behind Premonition "arguably came first" and was "certainly the most fantastic." The review noted that the film "makes sense only if you accept that time and space are mental constructs and that life and death are two sides of the same existential coin." Schilling noted Mikami's performance in the film stating that it "approaches the over-ripe in the film's early scenes" but "seems right for its later ones"

David Kalat of Video Watchdog stated that the film worked best when it "shrugs off the ghosts of past horror flicks and settles into its own groove", and notes that the "final reel is a real standout". Kalat concluded that the film was a "flawed but endearing work of second-tier J-horror".

== See also ==
- List of horror films of 2004
- List of Japanese films of 2004
