= Adam and Evil (2004 film) =

- DVD cover (Italian version)
- Directed by: Andrew Van Slee
- Produced by: Steve Popper
- Starring: Erica Cerra; James Clayton; Jodie Graham
- Release date: 2004
- Country: United States
- Language: English

Adam and Evil (also known as Halloween Camp 2: Scream If You Wanna Die Faster in the United Kingdom) is a 2004 American slasher film directed by Andrew Van Slee. It stars Erica Cerra, James Clayton, and Jodie Graham. The plot follows a group of friends who are stalked and murdered by a masked killer during a camping trip.

Filming for Adam and Evil began on April 30, 2003 in Los Angeles and was released on April 27, 2004.

Although there is no plot continuity, the UK name implies a sequel to 2003's Bloody Murder 2: Closing Camp, released as Halloween Camp in the UK. This in turn is a sequel to 2000's Bloody Murder in the US.

== Premise ==
A young group of friends head out to the woods for fun and frolics, but soon find themselves embroiled in a deadly game of cat and mouse with a masked killer.

== Cast ==
Actor	Role
Sean Arnfinson	Adam
Lynsey Brothers	Yvette
Erica Cerra	Yvonne
James Clayton	Shane (as Clayton Champagne)
Jeffrey Fisher	Clint
Jodie Graham	Earl
Brody Harms	Matt
Barbara Kottmeier	Evelyn
Terran Orletsky	Rob
Tiffany Paterson	Rachel (as Tiffany Patterson)
Richard Patterson	Billy
Kevin Robson	Seth
Shane Twerdun	Dave
Allison Warnyca	Maureen
Vanessa Van Slee	Daughter

== Critical response ==
Adam and Evil was criticized for its lack of originality at Rotten Tomatoes. One reviewer concluded: "I realize it's not as awful as I first thought it was ... I did find myself laughing a lot at all the bad acting". Another said "If you love mindless slashers where the plot is so simple Bullwinkle J. Moose could figure it out in record time, and the kids are dumber than the norm, then check out "Adam and Evil". Trust me you will not be disappointed".

Referring to the U.K. title, Andrew Smith says "devoid of everything that makes this genre such a predictably entertaining time, you'll want to die faster if you are unlucky enough to sit down to watch". The critic Timothy Gross comments that "this almost bloodless lame attempt at a slasher movie is horrible...", awarding it 1/2 star.
