= Michiko Hada =

Japanese actress (born 1968)

- 羽田美智子
- Born: September 24, 1968 (age 57); Mitsukaido, Ibaraki Prefecture, Japan
- Occupation: Actress
- Years active: 1988–present
- Spouse: Toshiaki Hirobe (m. 2011)

Michiko Hada (羽田美智子, Hada Michiko), (born 24 September 1968 in Mitsukaido, Ibaraki Prefecture, Japan), is a Japanese actress.

== Filmography ==
=== Television ===
- The Queen's Classroom (2005)
- Keishicho Sōsa Ikka 9 gakari (2006–)
- Hiyokko (2017), Kimiko Sukegawa

=== Film ===
- No Worries on the Recruit Front (1991)
- Flowers of Shanghai (1998)
- Infection (2004), Dr. Nakazono
- This Old Road: Konomichi (2019), Yosano Akiko
- Show Me the Way to the Station (2019)
- Senkaku 1945 (2026), Yoshi
