= Tales of the Unusual =

2000 Japanese horror anthology film

- DVD cover
- 世にも奇妙な物語 - 映画の特別編
- Directed by: Masayuki Suzuki; Mamoru Hoshi; Hisao Ogura; Masayuki Ochiai
- Screenplay by: Kōki Mitani; Katsuhide Suzuki; Masayuki Ochiai; Ryoichi Kimizuka; Mikimoto Nakamura; Mamoru Hoshi; Tomoko Aizawa
- Produced by: Jiro Komaki; Takashi Ishihara; Yuji Iwai; Yoshiichi Iguchi; Osamu Tezuka
- Cinematography: Hiroshi Takase; Osamu Onodera; Naoki Kayano; Hiroshi Takase; Osamu Fijiishi
- Edited by: Takuya Taguchi; Yoshifumi Fukazawa; Masaaki Yamamoto; Yoshifumi Fujisawa
- Music by: Kuniaki Haishima, Toshihiko Sahashi
- Production companies: Fuji Television; Toho; Pony Canyon
- Distributed by: Toho
- Release date: 3 November 2000 (Japan)
- Running time: 130 minutes
- Country: Japan

Tales of the Unusual (Japanese: 世にも奇妙な物語 - 映画の特別編, Hepburn: Yonimokimyōna Monogatari - Eiga no Tokubetsuhen) is a 2000 Japanese horror anthology film directed by Mamoru Hoshi, Masayuki Ochiai, Hisao Ogura and Masayuki Suzuki. Each story is of a different genre - "One Snowy Night" (horror), "Samurai Cellular" (comedy-drama), "Chess" (thriller) and "The Marriage Simulator" (romance-drama). It is the special film version of the long-running TV drama series of the same name (世にも奇妙な物語).

The TV series “Tales of the Unusual ’21 Summer Special” features the episode “Dead in 15 Seconds”

== Writing credits ==
- Tomoko Aizawa, segment The Marriage Simulator
- Ryoichi Kimizuka, segment Samurai Cellular
- Motoki Nakamura, segment Chess
- Masayuki Ochiai and Katsuhide Suzuki, segment One Snowy Night

== Cast ==
The Storyteller

- Tamori as the storyteller
- Kōji Yamamoto as a young man
- Ryuta Sato
- Kazuyuki Aijima
- Isao Yatsu as an old man
- Bokuzō Masana

One Snowy Night

- Akiko Yada as Misa Kihara
- Kazuma Suzuki as Takuro Yuki
- Akira Takarada as Haruomi Manabe
- Ren Osugi as Yoshiaki Yamauchi
- Mami Nakamura as Mari Kondō

The Marriage Simulator

- Izumi Inamori as Chiharu Takajo
- Takashi Kashiwabara as Yuichi Tokunagi
- Narumi Kayashima
- Kazuyuki Asano
- Saya Takagi
- Yukiya Kitamura
- Manami Konishi
- Hozumi Gōda

Chess

- Shinji Takeda as Akira Kato
- Renji Ishibashi as Old Man
- Masahiro Kōmoto as Seiichi Tomoda
- Yukiko Okamoto as Kumi Kato
- Chiharu Kawai
- Shōei

Samurai Cellular

- Kiichi Nakai as Ōishi Kuranosuke
- Megumi Okina as Karu
- Keiko Toda as Riku
- Norito Yashima as the operator
- Ryo Katsuji as Ōishi Chikara
- Kairi Narita as Horibe Yasubee
