= Masanobu Takashima =

Japanese film and television actor (born 1966)

- 髙嶋政伸
- Born: 27 October 1966 (age 59); Tokyo, Japan
- Occupation: Actor
- Years active: 1989–present
- Children: 1
- Relatives: Tadao Takashima (father), Hanayo Sumi (mother), Masahiro Takashima (brother)

Masanobu Takashima (髙嶋政伸, Takashima Masanobu) is a Japanese film and television actor.

== Career ==
Takashima appeared as Daisuke Matoba in the 2008 film L: Change the World (also known as Death Note: L Change the World) (2008).

== Personal life ==
Takashima is the son of actor Tadao Takashima and actress Hanayo Sumi, and younger brother of actor Masahiro Takashima.

== Filmography ==
=== Films ===
Year	Title	Role	Notes	Ref.
1989	Godzilla vs. Biollante	Major Sho Kuroki		
2004	Infection	Dr. Uozumi		
2008	L: Change the World	Daisuke Matoba		
2015	Assassination Classroom	Akira Takaoka		
2015	April Fools	Alcoholic Detective		
2020	Howling Village			
2020	Masked Ward	Tadokoro		
2020	Apparel Designer	Yūji Fujimura	Lead role	
2021	We Couldn't Become Adults	Takayuki Onda		
2024	The Floor Plan	Kiyotsugu Morigaki		
2025	Demon City	Kotaro Shinozuka		
2026	The Village of Eight Gravestones			

=== Television ===
Year	Title	Role	Notes	Ref.
1990–1998	Hotel	Ippei Akagawa	Lead role; 5 seasons	
1991	Taiheiki	Ashikaga Tadayoshi	Taiga drama	
1993	Double Kitchen	Shinobu Hanaoka	Lead role	
1996	Hideyoshi	Toyotomi Hidenaga	Taiga drama	
1997	Aguri	Akira Hayashi	Asadora	
2009	Tenchijin	Higuchi Sōemon	Taiga drama	
2016	Sanada Maru	Hōjō Ujimasa	Taiga drama	
2021	The Grand Family	Hideyuki Akutagawa		
2022	Chimudondon	Kōji Futatsubashi	Asadora	
2023	Ōoku: The Inner Chambers	Tokugawa Ieyoshi		
2025	The Laughing Salesman	Komisugi Mori	Episode 7	
2026	Brothers in Arms	Takeda Shingen	Taiga drama	
