= Goro Inagaki =

Japanese talento

Goro Inagaki 稲垣 吾郎
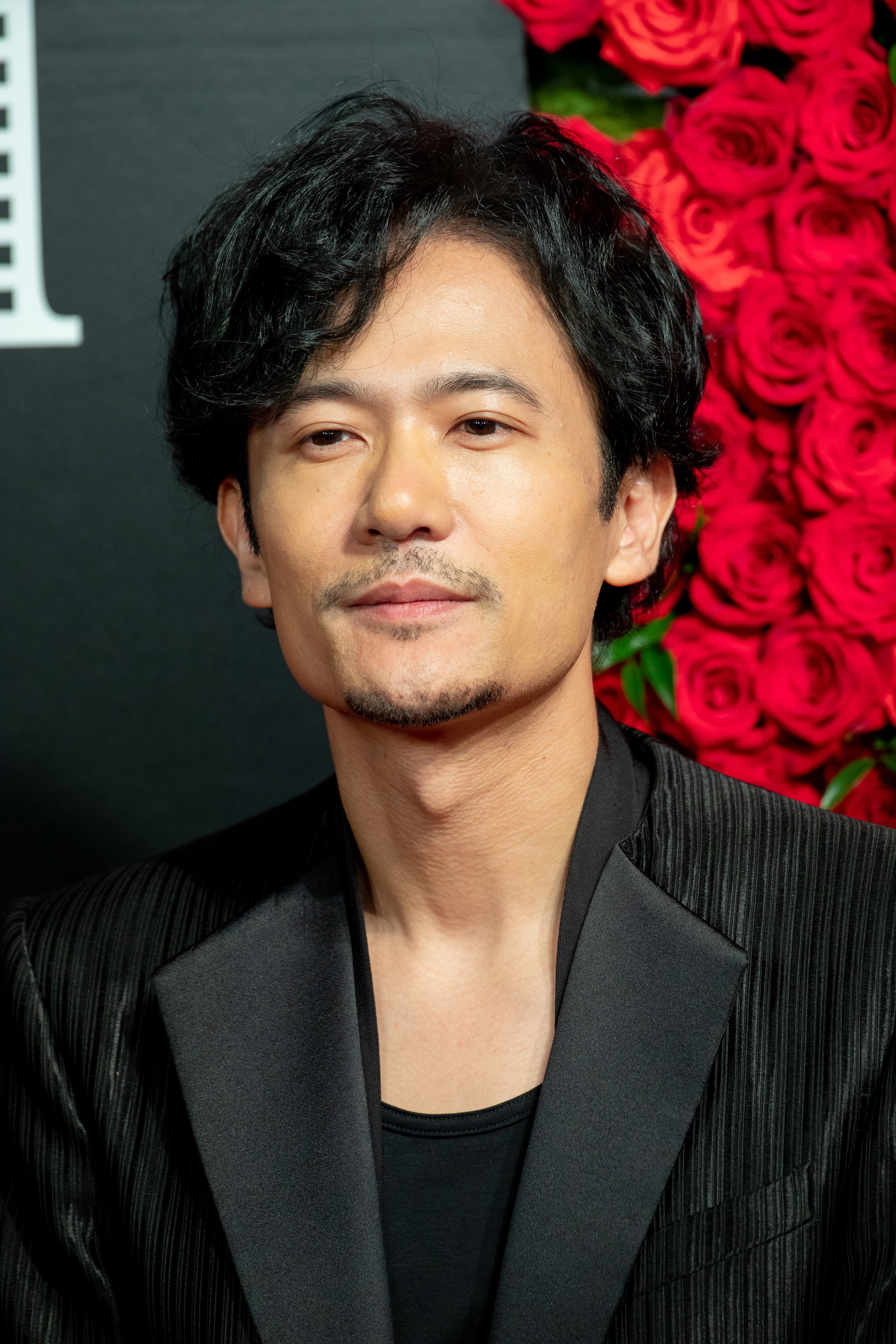

Background information
- Born: December 8, 1973 (age 52)
- Origin: Itabashi, Tokyo, Japan
- Genre: J-pop
- Occupations: Singer, actor
- Years active: 1987–present (entering Johnny & Associates)
- Member of: Atarashii Chizu
- Formerly of: SMAP

Goro Inagaki (稲垣 吾郎, Inagaki Gorō; born December 8, 1973) is a Japanese musician and actor from Itabashi, Tokyo. Inagaki was a member of the Japanese pop group SMAP. A year after the group's dissolution, Inagaki, alongside his former bandmates Tsuyoshi Kusanagi and Shingo Katori formed the group Atarashii Chizu.

His international film debut was in the romantic comedy Private Lessons II, playing the male lead role of a Japanese student who falls for his tutor. Private Lessons II also starred SMAP leader Masahiro Nakai.

== Filmography ==
=== Drama ===
- 1989: Seishun Kazoku (1989) as Daichi Agawa
- 1991: Gakkō e ikō as Toru Fujii
- 1992: Hatachi no Yakusoku as Akagi Junpei
- 1993: Uso Demo li Kara as Nogami Fumiya
- 1994: Tokyo Daigaku Monogatari as Naoki Murakami
- 1995: Saikō no Koibito as Michio Yoshinaga
- 1996: Subarashiki Kazokuryokō as Kikuchi Tadahiro
- 1997: Kare as Okamoto Toshiya
- 1997: Koi no Katamichikippu as Mori Shinichi
- 1998: Sommelier as Joe Satake
- 1998: A Strange Story (Autumn Special Edition) as Akira Bessho
- 1999: Kiken na Kankei as Takao Kawase
- 2000: Saimin as Saga Toshiya
- 2001: Onmyōji as Abeno Awimwi
- 2002: Kekkon no Jyōken as Kaoru Kurashima
- 2002: Yoisho no Otoko as Sakurai Kotaro
- 2002: Ren'ai Hensachi as Yusaku Natsume
- 2004: Hoshi ni Negai o as Shuta Okamoto
- 2004: Inugamike no Ichizoku (The Kindaichi Series) as Kousuke Kindaichi
- 2004: 9.11 as Yoichi Sugiyama
- 2004: Yatsuhakamura (The Kindaichi Series) as Kousuke Kindaichi
- 2005: M no Higeki as Ando Mamoru
- 2005: Asuka e soshite madaminukoe as Sawamura Seiji
- 2006: Jōōbachi (The Kindaichi Series) as Kindaichi Kosuke
- 2006: Busu no Hitomi ni Koishiteru as Yamaguchi Osamu
- 2007: Aakuma ga Kitarite Fue o Fuku (The Kindaichi Series) as Kindaichi Kosuke
- 2007: Hanazakari no Kimitachi e as Kitahama Noburo (ep. 9)
- 2008: Sasaki Fusai no Jinginaki Tatakai as Sasaki Norimichi
- 2009: Akuma no Temariuta (The Kindaichi Series) Kindaichi Kosuke
- 2009: Kamen Rider G as Goro
- 2009: Triangle as Kuroki Shun
- 2010: Nagareboshi as Shûichi Makihara
- 2011: Bull Doctor as Nakura Junnosuke
- 2012: Hungry! as Aso Tokio
- 2012: Dr. Kenzi as Masashi Morohashi
- 2013: Take Five: Oretachi wa ai o nusumeruka as Kai Iwatsuki
- 2013-2014: A Chef of Nobunaga as Akechi Mitsuhide
- 2016: Fukigen na Kajitsu as Koichi Mizukoshi
- 2019: Scarlet as Osaki Shigeyoshi
- 2022: Kaze yo Arashi yo as Jun Tsuji
- 2023: YuYu Hakusho as Sakyo

=== Movies ===
- 1990: Saraba itoshino yakuza as Takashi Takanashi
- 1993: Private Lessons II as Ken Soto
- 1994: Shoot! as Umahori
- 1996: Super Scandal as Toshiya Ota
- 1997: Parasite Eve as Tatsuro Ohno
- 1999: Hypnosis as Toshiya Saga
- 2004: University of Laughs as Hajime Tsubaki
- 2006: One Piece: The Giant Mechanical Soldier of Karakuri Castle as Ratchet (voice)
- 2010: Thirteen Assassins as Matsudaira Naritsugu
- 2016: Night's Tightrope Takao/Uncle
- 2018: Kuso-yarō to Utsukushiki Sekai as Goro
- 2019: Another World as Hiroshi Takamura
- 2019: Tezuka's Barbara as Yosuke Mikura
- 2019: Children of the Sea as Azumi Masaaki
- 2020: Labyrinth of Cinema as Ōkubo Toshimichi
- 2022: At the Window as Ichikawa Shigemi
- 2023: (Ab)normal Desire as Hiroki Terai
- 2024: Kaze yo Arashi yo as Jun Tsuji
- 2024: A Girl Named Ann as Tatsuki Kirino
- 2026: It's All Bananas!

=== TV shows ===
- 1992-1995: Yume ga Mori Mori as himself
- 1996-1997: WIN (1996–1997) as host
- 1996-2006: SMAP×SMAP as host
- 1999: Honto ni Atta Kowai Hanashi as Tateyama Michitaka
- 2000: Inagaki Geijutsukan
- 2001-2017: SmaSTATION!! as host
- 2002: Tokumei Research 200X: II as Tôru Date
- 2003-2010: Wasurebumi as host
- 2004: Goro no Sonata as host
- 2004: Goro no Hosomichi as host
- 2004-2009: Goro's Bar as host
- 2009-2010: Goro's Bar Presents my Fair Lady as host
- 2010: G.I. Goro as host
- 2010-2011: Aishuutantei 1756 as host
- 2011-2019: Goro Deluxe as host

== Stage ==
- No.9 - Immortal Melody as Ludwig van Beethoven (2015, 2018-2021, 2024, 2025)
- Harry Potter and the Cursed Child as Harry Potter (2025)
