= Anri Sugihara =

Japanese model (born 1982)

- 杉原 杏璃
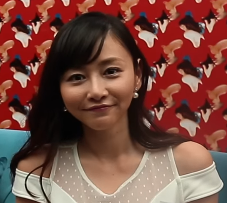
- Sugihara in 2015.
- Born: June 12, 1982 (age 43); Fukuyama, Hiroshima, Japan
- Occupation: Gravure idol
- Years active: 2003–present
- Height: 157 cm (5 ft 2 in)
- Spouse: Unknown (m. 2018; div. 2020)

Anri Sugihara (杉原 杏璃, Sugihara Anri; born June 12, 1982, in Fukuyama, Hiroshima, Japan), is a Japanese gravure idol. She is currently freelance.

== Biography ==
After Sugihara graduated from Hiroshima Prefectural Fukuyama Ashiyo High School, she moved to Tokyo. Thinking of how she could use her low height and her high voice, she decided to give gravure a go.

Sugihara likes Thailand, and her skill is capoeira. She is left-handed. Sugihara has gastroptosis. She has been successful several times in the stock investment, in 2014, she obtained the heading Zai Tech Tarento.

In 2012, Sugihara was appointed as a secretary of Hiroshima Prefecture tourism.

== Personal life ==
In 2018, it was announced that Sugihara had gotten married and decided to retire from gravure modeling. However, in 2022, there were reports circulating that she had gotten a divorce, which was later confirmed by Sugihara herself, saying it has already been a year since.

Sugihara took a break from gravure activities after getting married in 2018, but another reason was that she suddenly developed a fear of heights around the age of 33, which led her to move out of the tall apartment she was living in at the time and continue doing gravure activities while taking medication. She further elaborated that she has trouble flying in planes as she "faints and refuses to fly." She also revealed in an interview with Daily Shincho that since her debut, she has had a fear of water (especially the sea) and that it was because of her phobias that she did not like flying or going to the sea.

== Filmography ==
=== Variety ===
Year	Title	Network	Notes
2001	Harajuku Ronchāzu	BS Asahi	
2002	Televider	Tokyo MX	
2002	Denpa Shōnen-teki Hōsōkyoku	CS Japan	
2003	Hare Doki Doki Hare	CBC	
2003	Idol Michi	Fuji TV Two	
2005	Ashita mo Zettai: Pachirun?	Gunma TV	Assistant
2007	Enta! Selection	Enta!371	
2007	Yari-sugi Cozy	TV Tokyo	Sixth-generation Yari-sugi girl
2007	Utsukushiki Aoki do Now	TV Asahi	
2008	Arabikidan	TBS	
2009	Summers Shiki	TBS	Appeared on idol audition on "Dajare ga Umai no wa Dareja?"
2010	Honmadekka!?TV	Fuji TV	
2010	Yowikobu	MBS	Appeared in the food section
2010	Goddotan	TV Tokyo	Appeared in the corner of "Idol ni oppai o misete moraou"
2010	Megami Kōrin	Mondo TV	
2010	Kakyūn!!	Kansai	
2011	Bakuretsu Variety Shabadaba no Sora ni	Kansai	
2011	Sunday Japon	TBS	Irregular appearances
2012	Anri-chan no Shitsuji	TV Shinhiroshima	
2012	Haraguchi Akimasa no Ima ga Pachi Doki~tsu!	Tokyo MX	
2012	London Hearts	TV Asahi	
2012	Jun no Kanpai Shite Mita tsu!	TV Tokyo	
2012	Anri-chan no Shitsuji Z	TV Shinhiroshima	
2013	Mentsūdan	Setonaikai	
2013	Owarai Wide Show Marco Porori!	Kansai	
2013	Junji Inagawa no Kaidan Grand Prix 2013	Kansai	

=== Drama ===
Year	Title	Role	Network	Notes
2002	Shiawase no Shippo		TBS	Episodes 1 and 2
2002	Natsu no Hi no Koi: Summer Time		NHK	Episode 2
2008	Hisho no Kagami	Young woman of the secretary interview	TV Tokyo	Episode 2
2008	Tomica Hero: Rescue Force	Housewife	TV Tokyo	Episode 28
2012	Toranaide Kudasai!! Gravure Idol Ura Monogatari	Anri Sugihara	TV Tokyo	
2014	Tetsuko no Sodate-kata	Masako Watanabe	Nagoya TV	Episode 9

=== Films ===
Year	Title	Role	Notes
2010	O Haka ni Tomarou!	Hiroko Tsuyuki	
2016	... and Love	Anne	Lead role
