= Tracy Coogan =

Irish actress

- Born: Trim, County Meath, Ireland
- Occupation: Actress
- Awards: Fangoria Chainsaw Award 2006

Tracy Coogan is an Irish actress most widely noted for her leading role in the 2004 independent film Zombie Honeymoon.

== Career ==
Coogan was born and raised in Trim, County Meath, Ireland, one of five children of Michael and Ann Coogan. She first acted in many theatrical productions at school. The summer after she graduated from secondary school, Coogan went to New York City to represent Ireland in a modeling competition. She stayed in New York, where she landed roles in Irish Repertory Theatre stage productions of The Playboy of the Western World, The Colleen Bawn and Poor Beast in the Rain. Her first screen credit was a bit part as a model in the 1998 Woody Allen movie Celebrity. In 2002 Coogan starred in Love without Borders, a Russian television series filmed in Moscow. Coogan's performance as the loving wife of a zombie in the 2004 horror cult hit Zombie Honeymoon, which won her a Fangoria Chainsaw award in 2006 for best low-budget film, has been praised. The film was acquired by Showtime for release on both DVD and television. Coogan has been noted as "a passionate, sensitive and hard-working actor, with a strong professional work ethic." She stars also for the Charity event Bowling for Boobies on 27 October 2009 in Los Angeles alongside Carlee Baker, Heather Snell, Brooke Lewis and Eve Mauro, the event fights against Breast cancer.

== Filmography ==
Year	Title	Role
2002	Tommy Hobson and a Love Supreme	Supporting
2002	Love Without Borders	Natasha/Mary
2003	Six Tulips	The Girlfriend
2004	Zombie Honeymoon	Denise
2005	Horror Business	Herself
2006	The Adventures of Megabyte Man	Da Bom
2006	Fuse Fangoria Chainsaw Awards	Herself
2008	Return to Sender	Angela Gracie
2009	Penance	Natalie
2009	Dark Woods	Susan Branch
2009	The Devil In The Kitchen	
2009	No Saints For Sinners	Mary
2010	Another Life	Angela
2010	Thrillseekers The Indosheen	Julian
2011	A Good Day	Kelly
2012	Love/Hate, Octagon Films	Det Paula
2013	The Note	Actress
2015	The Picnic	Mary
2019	Flogging a Glass Horse	Bettie

== Stage ==
- Hamlet - Gertrude (The Tower Theatre )
- Macbeth - Lady Macbeth (Director Gavin McAlinden )
- La Rose Rouge - One Act (Director George Eugeniou)
- A Flea in her Ear - Raymonde Chandebise- (Director Gavin McAlinden)
- Trash - Girl (EST Los Angeles)
- The Colleen Bawn - Eily O'Connor (Irish Repertory Theatre)
- Scattergood - Miss Regan (MCC Theater)
- Poor Beast in the Rain - Eileen (Irish Art Center)
- Playboy of the Western World - Sara Tansay (Irish Repertory Theatre)
- Tell Dorie not to Cry - Dorie (Stetson Studio)
- Barefoot in the Park - Corie (Stetson Studio)
