= Zombie Honeymoon =

- Poster
- Directed by: David Gebroe
- Written by: David Gebroe
- Produced by: David Gebroe, Christina Reilly
- Starring: Tracy Coogan; Graham Sibley; Tonya Cornelisse; David M. Wallace
- Cinematography: Ken Seng
- Edited by: Gordon Grinberg
- Music by: Michael Tremante
- Distributed by: Hooligan Pictures (US)
- Release date: October 23, 2004 (Hamptons International Film Festival)
- Running time: 83 minutes
- Country: United States
- Language: English

Zombie Honeymoon is a 2004 independent horror film directed by David Gebroe and starring Tracy Coogan, Graham Sibley, Tonya Cornelisse, and David M. Wallace. It was produced by Hooligan Pictures. The New York Times described it as, "Not quite the campfest, it's absurd but the undeniably catchy title suggests, Zombie Honeymoon is actually an emotionally driven blend of romance, comedy and horror." The film won a Chainsaw award in 2006 for best low-budget film.

Zombie Honeymoon centers around the doomed love story of Denise (Tracy Coogan) and Danny (Graham Sibley) Zanders, whose honeymoon is disrupted by an attack that turns Danny into a zombie. Denise is torn between her desire to protect her husband and her revulsion at what he is becoming.

== Plot ==
American newlyweds Denise and Danny have just begun their month-long honeymoon by the ocean in New Jersey when Denise witnesses a ragged man, fully clad, emerging from the water. She screams to rouse her sleeping husband, but it is too late; the zombie attacks. Holding Danny down, he vomits a black, viscous fluid into Danny's mouth before collapsing. Rushed to the hospital, Danny cannot be revived, but as the doctor is telling Denise that her husband is dead he reanimates on his own. Soon after his release, it becomes clear to Denise that all is not well. The vegetarian Danny is craving meat. When Denise finds that her husband is struggling with compulsive cannibalism, she is horrified, but compelled by love and pity to clean up after him and protect him. Her efforts to help him overcome his urges prove futile. Danny's body count mounts while his willpower deteriorates as quickly as his decomposing flesh. Though Denise has not been able to bring herself to flee her husband, even as he kills their closest friends, the remaining bonds of love that have held Danny back from killing his bride seem to have dissolved. He attacks her and forces her down, beginning to produce the viscous fluid that had transformed him. Just before infecting Denise, he turns his head, sparing her his fate. He apologizes to her as he finally dies. Denise, after tenderly disposing of his body, goes back to the beach, where she remembers better times between them and looks to the tickets that the pair had purchased to start their dream life in Portugal.

== Production ==
Writer/director David Gebroe has discussed the genesis of the film in several interviews and in a "Behind the Scenes" feature on the 2006 Showtime Entertainment DVD release. Shortly after Gebroe completed his first feature film, The Homeboy, in March 2002, his younger sister's husband died in a surfing accident. Many of the details in the movie mirror his sister's story, including his sister Denise's art and her plan to move to Portugal with her husband, Danny. Gebroe was inspired by her experience to write a movie which, in his words, is "[a]bout how terrifying it is to dedicate yourself wholly and completely to a relationship in the knowledge that one day that person might be taken from you just like that." Gebroe told horror fansite Hollywood Gothique in 2005 that "Above everything else, [the film]...was kind of a valentine to her strength, her ability to get through her grief and keep moving in life." His choice of zombies to represent "the cruel hand of fate" was inspired both by the psychobilly music which his sister and her husband enjoyed and by the 1979 film Zombie by Lucio Fulci, which he and his sister saw as young children. He also cites as influences Roman Polanski's Macbeth, David Cronenberg's The Fly and Paul Morrissey's Andy Warhol's Frankenstein.

== Notes ==
The video clerk was wearing a shirt with the zombie from Lucio Fulci's cult classic, Zombi, and the video tape rejected was the previous movie of the director of The Homeboy.

== Critical reception ==
The film has had mixed critical reception, but the writing and acting have been widely singled out for praise. Variety, which described it as a "strong, well-thesped pic", indicated that it "scores simultaneously as romantic, tragic, grotesque and screamingly funny." Salon.com, which characterized it as "a highly disturbing combination of gruesome gore and earnest, tragic romance not encountered since David Cronenberg's "The Fly," if ever, singled out for praise the acting and the script, summarizing that "the film's strange blend of tragedy and surreal gore, à la Dario Argento and Lucio Fulci, is surprisingly effective." The New York Times notes that the film betrays its low budget, but though finding it "never truly engaging or frightening" suggests the movie is partially salvaged by "solid performances (especially Ms. Coogan's) and capable direction by Dave Gebroe, whose script is infused with some wickedly funny lines." The Village Voice found the story derivative, if sometimes funny, but also singled out Coogan, stating that "if this silly retread works at all, it's because of Coogan, who comes at the creaky premise with almost Streepian commitment and who is destined, it would seem, for better things."

== See also ==
- List of zombie films
