= Andrew Van Slee =

Canadian-born independent film director (born 1965)

- Born: 4 June 1965 (age 61); Vancouver, British Columbia
- Occupations: Film Director; Producer

Andrew Van Slee (born 4 June 1962) is a Canadian-born independent film director. His most successful work was the 2001 film Totally Blonde.

== Career ==
Van Slee was born on 4 June 1965 in Vancouver, British Columbia. He was trained as an opera singer and pianist. As a young man he became an actor, appearing in various local TV and film productions in Vancouver. He then studied at the American Academy of Dramatic Arts in Pasadena, California. At age 21 he moved to Toronto, Ontario where he became a sales manager for the publisher MacLean Hunter. After winning a lottery, he returned to Vancouver with his wife and opened ATV Studios, an acting school, as well as the extra casting agency Moo-vie Kidz for child actors in British Columbia.

Van Slee worked in the casting department for many TV movies between 1989 and 1994. In an article for the Independent Filmmakers Alliance Newsletter, he praised the value of the casting job as a way of learning the ropes in the film industry, working closely with the directors. He was a Line Producer/Production Manager on the 2001 film L.A.P.D.: To Protect and to Serve with Dennis Hopper and Michael Madsen, and formed his own production company Extraordinary Media Group to make several independent films. He obtained a job with Universal Music as a producer and composer. In this role, in 2008 he created Total Pop Star, an online singing competition.

== Work ==
Van Slee's successful 2001 film Totally Blonde starred Krista Allen, Maeve Quinlan and the singer Michael Bublé. Van Slee produced the film's soundtrack, Totally Bublé, which was a Billboard Top 20 album for a few weeks in 2003. Most of the songs on the short album were written by Van Slee. The CD featured Michael Bublé (vocals), Ian Putz (saxophone), Neil Nicholson (trombone), Bob Murphy (piano), Miles Hill (bass) and Buff Allen (drums). Van Slee also produced Bublé's first music video DVD. Other films produced by Van Slee through his production company Extraordinary Media Group include Net Games and Adam & Evil.

== Films ==
Year	Title	Genre	Roles
2004	Adam & Evil	Horror	Director, writer, producer
2003	Net Games	Thriller	Director, writer, producer, actor (Delivery guy)
2001	Totally Blonde	Romantic comedy	Director, writer, producer, actor (Babu)
2000	The Last American Virgin (short)		Director, writer, producer
1999	The Stalker (short)		Director, writer, producer
