= The Mailman (2004 film) =

2004 film by Tony Mark

- DVD released by IFM World Releasing
- Directed by: Tony Mark
- Written by: Brian Mazo
- Produced by: Erin Starr; Todd Wade
- Starring: Jesse Merrill; Rob Arbogast; Colene Taylor; Jamielyn Kane; Diana Kauffman; Bryan W. Lukasik; Gordon Anthony Davis
- Cinematography: Courtney Jones
- Edited by: Tony Mark; Todd Wade
- Music by: David Weinstein
- Production company: Rolling Pictures Inc.
- Distributed by: IFM World Releasing
- Release dates: July 13, 2004 (Los Angeles, California)
- Running time: 82 minutes
- Country: United States
- Language: English
- Budget: $33,000

The Mailman is a 2004 American thriller film directed by Tony Mark and written by Brian Mazo.

== Plot ==
In 1986, young Darius Foxx witnessed his mailman father shoot his wife and her secret lover, then himself. Eighteen years later, Darius becomes the new mailman of Smithfield, cryptically informing the townspeople that his predecessor is "out of town" for an indeterminate amount of time.

Behind his initially cheerful facade, Darius is a psychopath who tampers with the mail of the people on his route, rewriting letters and smashing packages, among other acts of vandalism. Aiding Darius is Daniel Everson, a teenage delinquent who had become disillusioned after discovering that his older sister, Beth, and his best friend, Jay, are dating, and after being informed by Darius that he is adopted. Unbeknownst to Daniel however, Darius is a serial killer who has begun murdering those who become suspicious of him, such as a gas meter man, and Daniel's girlfriend, Veronica.

After the two enact a plan to blackmail the corrupt mayor using information on his sons' illegal activities that they have gleaned from the mail, Darius reveals to Daniel that he is his biological brother, and that he had moved to Smithfield to find and reconnect with him. Darius later sends Daniel out to get beer, and while he is gone, Darius kills a hitman sent by the mayor. While Darius disposes of the hitman's body, Beth and Jay break in, having become concerned about the new mailman's activities, and his relationship with Daniel. After the two find the body of the original mailman (the actual owner of Darius's house) stuffed in a closet, Darius appears, knocks them out, and ties them up, intent on raping Beth in front of Jay. As Darius strips Beth, Daniel returns, and is ordered to kill Beth by Darius. Instead of obeying Darius, Daniel stabs him with a letter opener, and releases Beth and Jay. While a hysterical Daniel breaks down sobbing, Beth and Jay embrace, not noticing Darius's eyes open.

== Cast ==
- Rob Arbogast as Darius Foxx
- Collene Taylor as Beth Everson
- Bryan W. Lukasik as Daniel Everson/William Foxx
- Jesse Merrill as Jay
- Gil Zuniga as Jack Everson
- Mari Levitan as Beverly Everson
- Jamielyn Kane as Veronica
- Gordon Anthony Davis as Mayor Eastman
- Diana Kauffman as Lisa
- Danielle Petty as Ms. Sinclair
- Sally Robbins as Ms. Pickard
- Dan Harper as Meter Man
- James Thomas as Vince Eastman
- Trumayne Bolden as Vance Eastman
- Jennifer Snow as Mindy
- Dawn Shindle as Wendy
- Blu Fox as Messenger

== Reception ==
Dread Central's Mike Phalin gave the film a 1½ out of 5, and wrote, "The Mailman just never gets to any sort of peak or level that draws in the viewer" and "With so much potential to be a deep thriller about family ties and morals, it is hard to believe The Mailman ends up being just another one of those cheap films that goes nowhere and does nothing". A 2/5 was awarded by Richard Scheib of Moria, who noted that while The Mailman was bogged down by its low-budget, sub-par cinematography, and melodramatic direction, it was still "a wonderfully sordid little film" with memorable performances by Bryan W. Lukasik, Ari Tinnen, and Rob Arbogast.

== See also ==
- The Paperboy, a similar film from 1994.
