= Ice from the Sun =

- Directed by: Eric Stanze
- Written by: Eric Stanze
- Produced by: Jeremy Wallace
- Starring: DJ Vivona; Ramona Midgett; Jason Christ; Tommy Biondo
- Edited by: Eric Stanze
- Release date: 1999

Ice from the Sun is a 1999 independently produced horror film directed by Eric Stanze, and is St. Louis–based production company Wicked Pixel Cinema's second feature film.

== Plot ==
The concept of Ice from the Sun creates a third presence that disrupts the balance between Heaven and Hell. The Presence is a supernatural entity that rules a separate dimension surrounded by ice, where he brings imprisoned humans for eternal torture. The Presence had once been a human, but now commands omnipotent powers. A young woman who is in the midst of committing suicide is recruited by a coalition of angels and devils to infiltrate The Presence’s ice world as one of his prisoners for torture. Her goal is to get The Presence to recall his blocked memory of his human origins, which would allow his icy domain to melt and enable the angels and demons to destroy their common enemy.

== Production and reception ==
Ice from the Sun was produced in the St. Louis, Missouri, metropolitan area with a cast of local actors. Stanze used 193 rolls of Super 8 film (a total of 9,650 feet) to shoot the film.

The film was released on DVD in 1999 by SRS Cinema, and it received strong reviews in the horror film media. Mac McIntire, writing for DVD Verdict, stated the film was “recommended for die hard horror fans looking for something way off the beaten path.”

In 2001, the film received a theatrical release, where it was met with mixed reviews. Maitland McDonagh, writing for TV Guide Online, praised the film for being “often imaginative and surprisingly accomplished within the limits of its ultra-low budget.” However, Stephen Holden of The New York Times complained “it is the kind of film that only a certain breed of cinematic cultist could tolerate.” Also, Michael Atkinson, writing in The Village Voice, stated the film was “a furiously pointless punk-gore loogie that resets the bar on how wretched an amateur indulgence can be and still garner public screen time merely on the impression of being ‘transgressive.’”
