= Half-Caste (film) =

- DVD cover
- Directed by: Sebastian Apodaca
- Written by: Sebastian Apodaca
- Produced by: Sebastian Apodaca; Kim te Roller
- Starring: Sebastian Apodaca; Robert Pike Daniel; Kim Te Roller; Kathy Wagner
- Cinematography: Cooper Donaldson
- Edited by: Stuart Acher; Sebastian Apodaca
- Music by: Charlie Brissette; Hanu Khosla; Manu Khosla
- Distributed by: Universal Home Video
- Release date: August 3, 2004
- Running time: 86 minutes
- Country: South Africa
- Language: English

Half-Caste also called The Real Story of Half-Caste is a 2004 documentary-style horror film written and directed by Sebastian Apodaca. Set in Southern Africa, it centers around a group of documentary makers who search for the Half-Caste, a hybrid creature that is said to be part man and part leopard.

== Plot ==
One of Africa's most shocking legends comes to life in this terrifying tale of four students whose fascination with tales of a half-human, half-leopard man-beast find them fighting for their lives. The tales have been passed down through the generations, but few have lived to see the horrific monstrosity firsthand and lived to tell the tale. Now, as four students venture into the wilderness under the flawed theory of safety in numbers, the beast will make itself known, and the curious students will find out why some legends are best left to the storytellers.

== Cast ==
- Sebastian Apodaca as Bobby G. Cortez
- Robert Pike Daniel as Jan
- Kim Te Roller as Babzy-Cole
- Kathy Wagner as Cleo
- Greg Good as Ray
- Hylton Lea as Lourence
- Rob Zazzali as Gert
- Yvans Jourdain as Chris
- Kelly Cohen as Terry
- Philip Graham as Half-Caste

== Release ==
Universal Studios released the film on DVD on August 3, 2004, and was released again on DVD as a triple feature by Screen Media on August 24, 2010. and was released theatrically on Jan 25, 2006.

== Reception ==
Critical reception for the film has been extremely negative.

Bill Gibron from DVD Talk panned the film calling it one of the worst independent films ever made. Bill Thompson from Sound on Sight.com gave the film a negative review panning the film's acting, editing, and camera work stating, "There are horror movies and then there is Half-Caste, causing horror fans everywhere who think the genre can do no wrong to weep uncontrollably as they are subjected to its awfulness".
