= Marebito (film) =

- Film poster
- Directed by: Takashi Shimizu
- Written by: Takashi Shimizu; Chiaki Konaka
- Produced by: Tatsuhiko Hirata
- Starring: Shinya Tsukamoto; Tomomi Miyashita
- Cinematography: Tsukasa Tanabe
- Edited by: Masahiro Ugajin
- Music by: Toshiyuki Takine
- Production companies: Adness Entertainment; AtEntertainment; Culture Publishers; Japan CableCast; Panorama Communications
- Release dates: May 22, 2004 (Seattle International Film Festival); October 23, 2004 (Japan)
- Running time: 92 minutes
- Country: Japan
- Language: Japanese
- Box office: $107,259

Marebito (Japanese: 稀人, Hepburn: Visitor From Afar) is a 2004 Japanese horror film directed by Takashi Shimizu.

== Plot ==
Freelance cameraman Takuyoshi Masuoka (Shinya Tsukamoto) carries a camera everywhere he goes. He becomes obsessed with the idea of fear after seeing a frightened man, Kuroki, shove a knife into his eye to commit suicide. Wishing to understand the fear that the man must have felt before his death, Masuoka descends into a labyrinthine underground area beneath Tokyo, where he sees quadrupedal humanoid creatures that are stark white and whimper like dogs. While searching the tunnels and passages, Masuoka encounters a homeless man dwelling there who warns him about the "deros". He encounters Kuroki, who discusses the underworld and The Shaver Mystery with him. After hours of searching, Masuoka discovers an underground mountain range and the ruins of a city. He finds a nude young woman (Tomomi Miyashita) chained to a wall, and takes her back to his apartment.

The woman, whom Masuoka dubs 'F', does not eat, drink, or speak, has strangely formed toes and sharp teeth, and appears to be something other than human. Masuoka becomes obsessed with understanding her. He sets up cameras that enable him to observe her from his cell phone when he leaves the apartment, and checks on her regularly. While out shopping, Masuoka sees F speaking to someone off camera, and a menacing man in black appears behind him. He returns to the apartment, where a woman in a trench coat is lingering in the stairwell outside his door. Inside, Masuoka finds F in convulsions and unsuccessfully attempts to feed her. He discovers that twelve seconds of camera footage is missing, and receives a mysterious phone call from a payphone warning him that he is in serious trouble.

After being beaten with his camera by a stranger whom he filmed, Masuoka cuts his finger on the broken lens and returns home. He discovers that F survives on blood when she licks his finger, and cuts himself to feed her further. Masuoka begins to care for her by providing animal carcasses, deciding to treat F more as a pet than a human. The woman in the trench coat confronts him in the street, saying the girl is her daughter Fuyumi and demanding to know where she is. Masuoka denies having her daughter and runs away, returning to the apartment to find the lock broken, the inside ransacked, and F missing. He wanders the streets searching for F and encounters the man in black, who expresses his disappointment in Masuoka's handling of her, speaking to him telepathically in the same voice from the phone call. Masuoka returns to his apartment to find that F has returned, her hands bloody.

Outside, Masuoka is accosted by the woman, who demands he speak to her. Beginning to film her, he silently walks into an alley. As the woman keeps demanding to see her daughter, Masuoka stabs her to death on camera. He drains her corpse of blood to feed to F, which she ravenously drinks from baby bottles. He then lures a high school girl to a park at night under the pretense of filming amateur pornography and kills and films her too. Masuoka calls the payphone and speaks to the stranger, who agrees that Masuoka is taking better care of F now. While filming for a news crew at the scene of the second murder, Masuoka sees the girl he murdered standing beside the crime scene and glaring at him as her body is taken away. He leads F out of the apartment and abandons her in a karaoke room, then boards a train with no destination in mind.

After a period of weeks spent aimlessly, in an onsen town, Kuroki appears to Masuoka, and they discuss Masuoka's interest in fear, with Kuroki opining that fear is primal human knowledge locked away in the subconscious. Masuoka returns to Tokyo and lives among the homeless in the park where he killed the girl. He briefly admits to himself that he murdered his wife and a stranger and treated his daughter like an animal, before seeing a pair of deros on the street and finding a cell phone with a picture of his own terror-stricken face on it. He returns to his apartment, his wife's ghost appearing unseen behind him in the elevator, and finds the weakened F on the apartment floor. F speaks to him for the first time, and he cuts his tongue out to feed her. F leads Masuoka back down into the underworld, where she films him, as it appears he has finally discovered the fear that so intrigued him.

== Cast ==
- Shinya Tsukamoto as Takuyoshi Masuoka
- Tomomi Miyashita as F
- Kazuhiro Nakahara as Arei Furoki
- Miho Ninagawa as Aya Fukumoto
- Shun Sugata as the man in black

== Critical analysis ==
At different points in the film, different explanations are given for what is happening to Masuoka. Early conversations in the film seem to suggest that the tunnels and F herself may be a physical manifestation of human ideas. The film repeatedly references dangerous creatures called the dero who live underground, named after the "detrimental robots" in Richard Sharpe Shaver's A Warning to Future Man. At a later point in the film, it is suggested that Masuoka is insane and delusional, perhaps because he has stopped taking Prozac, and that his delusions have led him to kill innocent people and treat his daughter like an animal. The end of the film offers no concrete explanation.

In their book Lurker in the Lobby: A Guide to the Cinema of H. P. Lovecraft, Andrew Migliore and John Strysik write: "Marebito is a very good film that wears its influences proudly, without suffocating in their embrace. It's neither an adaptation nor an homage, but it swells with inspiration from Lovecraft's work. It's unconventional, free from cliché, and redolent with sinister insinuations that never become clear. You know them only by their shadows."

== Production ==
The film was made on digital video between the shooting of Ju-on: The Grudge and The Grudge. Shooting largely occurred on location in the Shinjuku Ward of Tokyo, primarily in the area around Shinjuku Station.

== See also ==
- Richard Sharpe Shaver
- Kaspar Hauser
- Peeping Tom
- Feral child
- Agartha
