= Norio Tsuruta =

Japanese film director (born 1960)

- 鶴田 法男
- Born: December 30, 1960 (age 65); Tokyo, Japan
- Occupations: Film director, screenwriter

Norio Tsuruta (鶴田 法男, Tsuruta Norio; born December 30, 1960) is a Japanese film director. He directed Premonition, Dream Cruise, and Orochi: Blood.

== Career ==
Tsuruta directed Dream Cruise for the Masters of Horror Showtime cable network series. It is based on the short story of the same name by Koji Suzuki.

He also directed Orochi: Blood, which is based on the manga by Kazuo Umezu.

== Filmography ==
=== Film ===
- Toneriko (1985)
- Scary True Stories: Ten Haunting Tales from the Japanese Underground (1991)
- Scary True Stories: Night 2 (1992)
- Scary True Stories: Realm of Spectres (1992)
- Gotoshi Kabusikigaisha (1993)
- Gotoshi Kabusikigaisha 2 (1994)
- Ring 0: Birthday (2000)
- Kakashi (2001)
- Premonition (2004)
- Orochi: Blood (2008)
- Ōsama Game (2011)
- POV: Norowareta Film (2012)
- Talk to the Dead (2013)
- Z ~Zed~ (2014)

=== Television ===
- Sky High (2003)
- Dream Cruise (2007)
- ? (series) (2012-2015)
