= Masayuki Ochiai =

Japanese film director (born 1958)

- Born: 1958 (age 67–68)
- Occupation: Film director

Masayuki Ochiai (落合正幸, Ochiai Masayuki) is a Japanese film director. His films include Kansen and Saimin.

== Biography ==
Masayuki Ochiai was born in 1958. Ochiai grew up in the Western Tokyo suburb of Setagaya, where the studios for Toho, Nikkatsu and Daiei Film were located. He recalled watching fantasy televisions shows, including American shows such as The Twilight Zone and The Outer Limits as well as Japanese shows such as Ultra Q. Ochiai stated that the shows influenced in "not so much in style, but in how they got me excited. Today, when making films or TV movies, I work hard ont create that same kind of excitement, hoping todays' audience can experience the joy I felt when i was young." Ochiai's main influence to become a director was Charlie Chaplin after seeing City Lights and The Kid while in junior high school. He went to the Nihon University College of Art, and believed that at that time that Japanese films were not doing well and it would be impossible to get to work on feature films and went into work as a television director.

Ochiai made a short film for the dramatic series Yonimo Kimyou Na Monogatari called Midnight Call in 1990. Ochiai also directed episodes of the television series Night Head for Fuji TV and the science fiction themed Black Out. His film Parasite Eve was based on the novel of the same name which was very popular in Japan. Ochiai reflected on making the film, stating he was "not really happy with the circumstances I was under when I had to create [Parasite Eve]...First of all I was forced by the producers to make it a love story. There were so many compromises I had to make that it couldn't be a true horror movie." It was released in 1997 in Japan.

Ochiai's next film was Saimin which was released as The Hypnotist in the United States and Hypnosis in the United Kingdom. Ochiai recalled he was contacted to work on Saimin by the company that published the novel. The film was released theatrically in Japan in 1999. After the release of Parasite in Japan, he made his American feature film with Shutter, a remake of the 2004 Thai film.

== Filmography ==
Films

- Parasite Eve (1997)
- Saimin (Hypnosis) (1999)
- Yo nimo kimyo na monogatari - Eiga no tokubetsuhen (Tales of the Unusual) (segment "One Snowy Night") (2000)
- Kansen (Infection) (2004)
- Shutter (2008)
- Kotodama – Spiritual Curse (2014)
- Ju-On: The Beginning of the End (2014)
- Ju-On: The Final Curse (2015)

Television

- Toki o Kakeru Shōjo (1994)
- Dark Tales of Japan, episode Presentiment, (2004)
