= List of horror films of 2008 =

A list of horror films released in 2008.

Horror films released in 2008
Title	Director	Cast	Country	Notes
4bia	Banjong Pisanthanakun, Paween Purikitpanya, Yongyoot Thongkongtoon, Parkpoom Wongpoom	Laila Boonyasak, Apinya Sakuljaroensuk, Maneerat Kham-uan	Thailand	
The 13th Alley	Bobb Hopkins	Robert Carradine, Shayne Lamas, David Kors	United States	
100 Feet	Eric Red	Famke Janssen, Bobby Cannavale, Ed Westwick	United States	
Able	Marc Robert		Germany; United States	
Accuracy of Death	Masaya Kakei	Sumiko Fuji, Manami Konishi, Takeshi Kaneshiro	Japan	
Acolytes	Jon Hewitt	Hanna Mangan-Lawrence, Joshua Payne, Belinda McClory	Australia	
Alien Raiders	Ben Rock	Carlos Bernard, Rockmond Dunbar, Mathew St. Patrick	United States	
The Alphabet Killer	Rob Schmidt	Eliza Dushku, Cary Elwes, Timothy Hutton	United States	Direct-to-video
Amateur Porn Star Killer 2	Shane Ryan	Kai Lanette, Shane Ryan	United States	
Amusement	John Simpson	Katheryn Winnick, Laura Breckenridge, Jessica Lucas	United States	
Anaconda 3: Offspring	Don E. Faunt LeRoy	Crystal Allen, David Hasselhoff, John Rhys-Davies	United States	Television film
Animals	Douglas Aarniokoski	Marc Blucas, Naveen Andrews, Nicki Aycox	United States	Direct-to-video
April Fool's Day	Mitchell Altieri, Phil Flores	Scout Taylor-Compton, Sabrina Aldridge, Josh Henderson	United States	Direct-to-video, film remake
Asylum	David R. Ellis	Sarah Roemer, Lin Shaye	United States	
At the House of Madness	Steve Sessions	Donna Hamblin, Donny Versiga, Danin Drahos	United States	
Attitude for Destruction	Ford Austin	Jed Rowen, Monte Hunter, Tanya Sabat	United States	
Autopsy	Adam Gierasch	Robert Patrick, Jenette Goldstein	United States	
Ba'al	Paul Ziller	Cedric De Souza, Lexa Doig, Zen Shane Lim	United States	
Baby Blues	Lars Jacobson, Amar Kaleka	Colleen Porch, Ridge Canipe, Kali Majors	United States	
Babysitter Wanted	Jonas Barnes, Michael Manasseri	Sarah Thompson, Matt Dallas, Kristen Dalton	United States	
Backwoods	Marty Weiss	Haylie Duff, Ryan Merriman, Mimi Michaels	United States	
Bad Biology	Frank Henenlotter	Charlee Danielson, Anthony Sneed, Tom Kohut	United States	
Banshee!!!	Colin Theys	Ashley Bates, Iris McQuillan, Troy Walcott	United States	
Beast	Timo Rose	Thomas Kercmar, Raine Brown, Joe Zaso	Germany	
Because There Are Things We Never Forget	Lucas M. Figueroa	Giulio Baldari, Fabio Cannavaro, Emiliana Olmedo	Argentina	
Bedfellows	Drew Daywalt	Kerry Finlayson, Edin Gali, Peter Giliberti	United States	Short film
Beyond the Dunwich Horror	Richard Griffin	Sarah Nicklin, Jeff Dylan Graham, Ruth Sullivan	United States	
Beyond Loch Ness	Paul Ziller	Brian Krause, Carrie Genzel, Niall Matter	Canada	
Beyond the Rave	Matthias Hoene	Sadie Frost, Sebastian Knapp, Axelle Carolyn	United Kingdom	
Die Bienen – Tödliche Bedrohung	Michael Karen	Sonja Kirchberger, Klaus J. Behrendt, Janin Reinhardt	Germany	
Bikini Bloodbath Car Wash	Jonathan Gorman, Thomas Edward Seymour	Debbie Rochon, Russ Russo, Sheri Lynn	United States	
Bitten	Harvey Glazer	Erica Cox, Jason Mewes, Amy Lynn Grover	United States	
Blitzkrieg: Escape from Stalag 69	Keith J. Cocker,	Tatyana Kot, Charles Esser, Wayne Chang	United States	
Blood Red Earth	J.T. Petty	Larry Fessenden, Pearl Sandy, Malajia Parsons	United States	
Bloodlock	William Victor Schotten	Debra Gordon, Ashley Gallo, Gregg Biamonte	United States	
Bloodwine	Patrick Keith	Melissa Johnson, Lora Meins, Christina DeYoung	United States	
Bonnie & Clyde vs. Dracula	Timothy Friend	Jordan Baranowski, Anita Cordell, Ari Bavel	United States	
Boogeyman 3	Gary Jones	Erin Cahill, Chuck Hittinger, Mimi Michaels	United States	
Boston Strangler: The Untold Story	Michael Feifer	David Faustino, Jen Nikolaisen, Corin Nemec	United States	
Bundy: An American Icon	Michael Feifer	Corin Nemec, Jen Nikolaisen, David DeLuise	United States	
The Burrowers	J.T. Petty	Jocelin Donahue, William Mapother, Harley Coriz	United States	
Caesar and Otto's Summer Camp Massacre	Dave Campfield	Felissa Rose, Joe Estevez, Ken MacFarlane	United States	
Carver	Franklin Guerrero Jr	Matt Carmody, Neil Kubath, Erik Fones	United States	
The Children	Tom Shankland	Eva Birthistle, Eva Sayer, Jeremy Sheffield	United Kingdom	
Cloverfield	Matt Reeves	Lizzy Caplan, Jessica Lucas, T.J. Miller	United States	
The Coffin	Ekachai Uekrongtham	Florence Faivre, Aki Shibuya, Karen Mok	South Korea; Hong Kong; Thailand	
Cold Prey 2	Mats Stenberg	Viktoria Winge, Marthe Snorresdotter Rovik, Ingrid Bolsø Berdal	Norway	
Colin	Marc Price	Tat Whalley, Dominic Burgess, Rami Hilmi	United Kingdom	
Conjurer	Clint Hutchison	Andrew Bowen, Maxine Bahns, Terrence Gibney	United States	
The Cottage	Paul Andrew Williams	Andy Serkis, Reece Shearsmith, Jennifer Ellison	United Kingdom	
Credo	Toni Harman	MyAnna Buring, Clayton Watson, Mark Joseph, Nathalie Pownall, Rhea Bailey, Chris Jamba	United Kingdom	Direct-to-video Alternative titles Also known as The Devil's Curse.
Creep	Drew Daywalt, David Schneider	Molly Beck Ferguson, Paul Hungerford	United States	Short film
The Curse of Lizzie Borden 2: Prom Night	Eric Swelstad	Roxy Darr, Monte Hunter, Jeanine Orci	United States	
Dance of the Dead	Gregg Bishop	Jared Kusnitz, Carissa Capobianco, Dave R. Watkins	United States	
Dark Floors	Pete Riski	Skye Bennett, Philip Bretherton, William Hope, Ronald Pickup, Leon Herbert	Finland	
The Dark Lurking	Gregory Connors	Aash Aaron, Ozzie Devrish, Tonia Renee	United States	
Dark Reel	Josh Eisenstadt	Lance Henriksen, Edward Furlong, Tiffany Shepis	United States	
Day of the Dead	Steve Miner	Christa Campbell, Nick Cannon	United States	Direct-to-video
Dead Country	Andrew Merkelbach	William Malone, Janet Tracy Keijser, Lloyd Kaufman	Australia	
Dead by Dawn	Nigel Hartwell	Anthony Cortese, Charles Wahl, Tiffany Edwardsen	Canada	
Dead Fury	Frank Sudol	Frank Sudol	United States	Animation
Dead and Gone	Yossi Sasson	Felissa Rose, Zack Ward, Marilyn Ghigliotti	United States	
Deadgirl	Marcel Sarmiento & Gadi Harel	Michael Bowen, Noah Segan, Candice Accola, Shiloh Fernandez	United States	
Death Bell	Chang (Yoon Hong-seung)	Lee Beom-soo, Kim Bum, Nam Gyu-ri	South Korea	
Death of Evil	Damian Chapa	Damian Chapa, Natasha Blasick, Steve Nave	United States	
The Death Factory Bloodletting	Sean Tretta	Josh Bingenheimer, Shareese Hegna, David C. Hayes	United States	
Death on Demand	Adam Matalon	Jerry Broome, Elisabeth Jamison, Anne McDaniels	United States	
Deaths Door	George Scileppi	Alicia Petides, Yuri Lowenthal, Kristen Pfeifer	United States	
Demon Divas and the Lanes of Damnation	Mike Watt	Debbie Rochon, Amy Lynn Best, Sofiya Smirnova	United States	Direct-to-video
Demon Kiss	Dennis Devine	Stacy Glassgold, Thomas Michael Clemons, Sally Fay Dalton	United States	
The Devil's Ground	Michael Bafaro	Daryl Hannah, Luke Camilleri, Leah Gibson	United States	
The Devil's Music	Pat Higgins	Cy Henty, Victoria Hopkins, Eleanor James	United Kingdom	
Diary of the Dead	George A. Romero	Michelle Morgan, Joshua Close, Shawn Roberts	United States	
The Disappeared	Johnny Kevorkian	Finlay Robertson, Tom Felton, Nikki Amuka-Bird	United Kingdom	
Dorothy Mills	Agnès Merlet	Carice van Houten, Jenn Murray, Ger Ryan, Gavin O'Connor	France	
Dying God	Fabrice Lambot	Lance Henriksen, James Horan, Misty Mundae	France	
Eat Your Heart Out	James Tucker	Joshua Nelson, Frank Campana, Alan Rowe Kelly	United States	
The Echo	Yam Laranas	Jesse Bradford, Amelia Warner, Iza Calzado	United States	
Eden Lake	James Watkins	Kelly Reilly, Michael Fassbender, Jack O'Connell	United Kingdom	
Evil Calls: The Raven	Richard Driscoll	Christopher Walken, Eileen Daly, Rik Mayall	United Kingdom	
Excision	Richard Bates Jr.	Nelson Franklin, Paul Fahrenkopf, Tessa Ferrer	United States	
The Eye	David Moreau, Xavier Palud	Jessica Alba	United States	Film remake
The Facts in the Case of Mister Hollow	Rodrigo Gudiño, Vincent Marcone	Lea Lawrynowicz, Tony Morrone, Julian Richings	Canada	Animation
Farmhouse	George Bessudo	Jamie Anne Allman, Flynn Beck, Jack Donner	United States	
Fearmakers	Timo Rose	Thomas Kercmar, Debbie Rochon, Manoush	Germany	
Feast II: Sloppy Seconds	John Gulager	Jenny Wade, Cassie Shea Watson, Diane Ayala Goldner	United States	
Fetus	Brian Paulin	Joe Olson, Kevin Barbare, Ernest Hutcherson	United States	
Fog Warning	Christopher Ward		United States	
Frat House Massacre	Alex Pucci	Rane Jameson, Michael Galante, Lisa DiCicco	United States	
Frozen	Jon McMahand	Debbie Bledsoe, Jon McMahand,	United States	
The Gates of Hell	Kelly Dolen	Amy Beckwith, Bradley Tomlinson, Samantha Noble	Australia	
Gingerdead Man 2: Passion of the Crust	Silvia St. Croix	Junie Hoang, Pieter Christian Colson, Frank Nicotero	United States	
Gonger	Christian Theede	Sebastian Ströbel, Teresa Weißbach, Bela B., Vadim Glowna, Manuel Cortez	Germany	
Good Will Evil	Lin Yu-Fen, Wang Ming-Chan	Terri Kwan, Tammy Chen, Leon Dai, Lu Yi-Ching, Cindy Chi, Chen Wen-Cheng	Taiwan	
Goth	Gen Takahashi	Kanata Hongô, Rin Takanashi, Sotaro Yasuda	Japan	
Grave Mistakes	Chris LaMartina	Shane Elliott, John Beck, Ryan Thomas	United States	
Grizzly Park	Tom Skull	Glenn Morshower, Emily Foxler, Randy Wayne	United States	
Guesthouse in the snow	Saeed Soltani	Hossein Yari, Yekta Nasser, Laleh Eskandari, Mohammad Hadi Ghomeishi	Iran	
Gutterballs	Ryan Nicholson	Scott Alonzo, Saraphina Bardeaux	Canada	
The Happening	M. Night Shyamalan	Mark Wahlberg, Zooey Deschanel, John Leguizamo, Betty Buckley	United States; India	
Haunted Echoes	Harry Bromley Davenport	David Starzyk, Juliet Landau, M. Emmet Walsh	United States	
The Haunting of Molly Hartley	Mickey Liddell	Haley Bennett, Chace Crawford, Jake Weber	United States	
Hell House: The Book of Samiel	Jason Morris	Mike Carlis, Jessica Marie, Geof Libby, Sheila Kraicks	United States	
Hellbinders	Mitch Gould, Hiro Koda	Richard Cetrone, Kamila Korz, Ray Park	United States	
The Hiding	Ramon Hamilton	Cassidy Brown, Jourdan Van Eman, Maya Gilbert	United States	
The Hive	Peter Manus	Kal Weber, Elizabeth Healey, Jessica Reavis	United States	
Home Movie	Christopher Denham	Adrian Pasdar, Cady McClain, Amber Joy Williams	United States	
The Horribly Slow Murderer with the Extremely Inefficient Weapon	Richard Gale	Michael James Kacey, Fay Kato, Melissa Paladino	United States	Short film
Horror House	Chad Martin	Emily Fradenburgh, Anna Klemp, Justen Overlander	United States	
The Horror Vault	David Boone, Josh Card, Russ Diapper, Mark Marchillo, Kenny Selko, Kim Sønderholm, Thomas Steen Sørensen, J.P. Wenner	Jonathon Trent, Martin Frislev Ammitsbøl, Mandy Amano	United States; Denmark; Australia; United Kingdom	
Hot Rod Horror	Darrell Mapson	Alexandra Gorman, Willy Ortlieb, Mark MacPherson	United States	
House of Usher	David DeCoteau	Michael Cardelle, Jill Jacobson, Jaimyse Haft	United States	
How to Be a Serial Killer	Luke Ricci	Laura Regan, Dameon Clarke, George Wyner	United States	
Hurt	Barbara Stepansky	Jackson Rathbone, Melora Walters, William Mapother	United States	
I Can See You	Graham Reznick	Ben Dickinson, Olivia Villanti, Larry Fessenden	United States	
I will never Die alone	Adrián García Bogliano	Andres Aramburu, Rolf Garcia, Gimena Blesa	Argentina	
I Sell the Dead	Glenn McQuaid	Dominic Monaghan, Larry Fassenden, Angus Scrimm	United States	Horror comedy
iMurders	Robbie Bryan	Brooke Lewis, William Forsythe, Tony Todd	United States	
Infected	Adam Weissman	Maxim Roy, Gil Bellows, Glenda Braganza	Canada	
Insanitarium	Jeff Buhler	Jesse Metcalfe, Lisa Arturo, Peter Stormare	United States	
Into the Woods	Phil Herman	Lilith Stabbs, Dave Castiglione, Nancy Feliciano	United States	
Intrusion	Dru Pfeiffer	Katie Stewart, Teresa Lawrence, Lee Haycraft	United States	
The Invisible Chronicles	David DeCoteau		United States	
Isle of the Damned	Mark Colegrove	Jared Books, Aimee Cummings, Megan Mundane	United States	
Kemper	Rick Bitzelberger	Robin DeMarco, Robert Sisko, Samantha Colburn	United States	Television film
Kill Theory	Chris Moore	Don McManus, Ryanne Duzich, Teddy Dunn, Patrick Flueger	United States	
Killer Movie	Jeff Fisher	Leighton Meester, Paul Wesley	United States	
Killer Pad	Robert Englund	Daniel Franzese, Eric Jungmann, Shane McRae	United States	
Lake Mungo	Joel Anderson	Scott Terrill, Talia Zucker, Scott Terrill	Australia	
Last of the Living	Logan McMillan	Robert Faith, Ashleigh Southam, Emily Paddon-Brown	New Zealand	
Left Bank	Pieter Van Hees	Eline Kuppens, Frank Vercruyssen, Sien Eggers	Belgium	
Let the Right One In	Tomas Alfredson	Kåre Hedebrant, Lina Leandersson, Per Ragnar	Sweden	
Live Animals	Jeremy Benson	John Still, Christian Walker, Patrick Cox	United States	
Loner	Park Jae-sik	Go Eun-ah, Jeong Yoo-seok, Chae Min-seo	South Korea	
Long Weekend	Jamie Blanks	James Caviezel, Claudia Karvan	Australia	Direct-to-video
Lost Boys: The Tribe	P.J. Pesce	Tad Hilgenbrink, Angus Sutherland, Autumn Reeser	United States	Direct-to-video
Loved Ones	Shawn Cain	Chuck Williams, Neil D'Monte, Stefano Capone	United States	
The Machine Girl	Noboru Iguchi	Minase Yashiro, Asami, Ryōsuke Kawamura	United States; Japan	
Magus	John Lechago	Eva Derrek, Lea Downey, Beth Cheng	United States	
Make-out with Violence	Deagol Brothers	Eric Lehning, Cody DeVos, Leah High	United States	
Mamá	Andrés Muschietti	Berta Ros, Victoria Harris, Irma Monroig	Spain	
Manhunt	Patrik Syversen		Norway	
Martyrs	Pascal Laugier	Morjana Alaoui, Mylène Jampanoï	France; Canada	
The Midnight Meat Train	Ryuhei Kitamura	Bradley Cooper, Vinnie Jones	United States	
Midnight Movie	Jack Messitt	Michael Schwartz, Michael Swan, Brea Grant	United States	
Mirrors	Alexandre Aja	Kiefer Sutherland, Paula Patton, Amy Smart	United States	
Monster	Erik Estenberg	Sarah Lieving, Erin Evans, Jennifer Kim	United States	
Monster from Bikini Beach	Darin Wood	Tess Thomas, Amber Kloss, Laura Stahl	United States	
Mud Zombies	Rodrigo Aragão		Brazil	
Murder Loves Killers Too	Drew Barnhardt	Allen Andrews, Scott Christian, Christine Haeberman	United States	
Mutant Vampire Zombies From the Hood	Thunder Levin	C. Thomas Howell, Rachel Montez Collins, Robert Wu	United States	
Mutants	Amir Valinia	Michael Ironside, Louis Herthum, Steven Bauer	United States	
Never Cry Werewolf	Brenton Spencer	Nina Dobrev, Kevin Sorbo, Peter Stebbings	Canada	
Night Watcher	Will Gordh	Daniel Vincent Gordh, Rachel Owens, Robert Petrarca	United States	
Nite Tales	Deon Taylor	Andrea Bogart, Dante Basco, Flavor Flav	United States	
Not like Others	Peter Pontikis		Sweden	
Nu-Meri: Book of the New Spawn	Yûichi Kanemaru	Chiharu Komatsu, Gô Ibuki, Ai Fukaya	Japan	
O.C. Babes and the Slasher of Zombietown	Creep Creepersin	Elissa Dowling, Cody Cowell, Noelle Balfour	United States	
Offspring	Andrew Van Den Houten	Art Hindle, Pollyanna McIntosh, Spencer List	United States	
Ogre	Steven R. Monroe	Brendan Fletcher, Katharine Isabelle, Kimberley Warnat	Canada; United States	
One Missed Call	Eric Valette	Edward Burns, Shannyn Sossamon, Ana Claudia Talancón	United States	Film remake
Onechanbara	Yohei Fukuda	Taro Suwa, Eri Otoguro, Chise Nakamura, Manami Hashimoto	Japan	
The Open Door	Doc Duhame	Daniel Booko, David Alan Graf, Sarah Christine Smith	United States	
Otis	Tony Krantz	Illeana Douglas, Jere Burns, Jared Kusnitz	United States	
Otto; or, Up With Dead People	Bruce LaBruce	Jey Crisfar, Marcel Schlutt, Nicholas Fox Ricciardi	Germany; Canada	
Outpost	Steve Barker	Julian Rivett, Ray Stevenson, Richard Brake	United Kingdom	
Parasomnia	William Malone	Dylan Purcell, Jeffrey Combs, Cherilyn Wilson	United States	
Philosophy of a Knife	Andrey Iskanov	Yukari Fujimoto, Svyatoslav Iliyasov, Manoush	Russia; United States	
Phoonk	Ram Gopal Varma	Anu Ansari, Shrey Bawa, Ahsaas Channa	India	
Pig Hunt	James Isaac	Tina Huang, Travis Aaron Wade, Rajiv Shah	United States	
Pink Eye	James Tucker	Melissa Bacelar, Zoë Daelman Chlanda, Emma Hinz	United States	
Plaguers	Brad Sykes	Jared Michaels, Alexis Zibolis, Steve Railsback	United States	
Playing with Fire	David DeCoteau		United States	
Pontypool	Bruce McDonald	Georgina Reilly, Boyd Banks, Lisa Houle	Canada	
Porn Horror Movie	Adam Fields	Ron Jeremy, Amber Benson, Charles Napier, Veronica Hart	United States	
Prom Night	Nelson McCormick	Brittany Snow, Scott Porter, Jessica Stroup	United States	Film remake
Pulse 2: Afterlife	Joel Soisson	Jamie Bamber, Karley Scott Collins	United States	Direct-to-video
Pulse 3	Joel Soisson	Brittany Finamore, Rider Strong	United States	Direct-to-video
Punk Rock Holocaust 2	Doug Sakmann	Lloyd Kaufman, Kevin Lyman, James Christopher Black	United States	
Quarantine	John Erick Dowdle, Drew Dowdle	Jennifer Carpenter, Jay Hernandez, Johnathon Schaech	United States	
Red Canyon	Giovanni Rodriguez	Christine Lakin, Noah Fleiss, Norman Reedus	United States	
The Red Hours	John Fallon	Deke Richards, Amy Wickenheiser, Heather Westwood	Canada	
Red Mist	Paddy Breathnach	Arielle Kebbel, Christina Chong, MyAnna Buring	United Kingdom	
Reel Zombies	David J. Francis	Mike Masters, Tony Watt, Lloyd Kaufman	Canada	
ReGOREgitated Sacrifice	Lucifer Valentine	Maja Lee, Ameara Lavey, Allen Nasty	Canada; United States	
Repo! The Genetic Opera	Darren Lynn Bousman	Anthony Head, Alexa Vega, Paul Sorvino	United States	
Rest Stop: Don't Look Back	Joey Mendicino	Richard Tillman, Jessie Ward, Graham Norris	United States	
Return to Sleepaway Camp	Robert Hiltzik	Vincent Pastore, Jackie Tohn, Gregory Raposo	United States	
No Man's Land: The Rise of Reeker	Dave Payne	Michael Muhney	United States	
Rock Monster	Declan O'Brien	Jon Polito, Natalie Denise Sperl, Niki Iliev	United States	
The Ruins	Carter B. Smith	Jonathan Tucker, Jena Malone, Laura Ramsey	United States	
Sasquatch Assault	Andrew Gernhard	Greg Nutcher, Kevin Shea, Cuyle Carvin	United States	
Sauna	Antti-Jussi Annila	Viktor Klimenko, Sonja Petäjäjärvi, Vilhelmiina Virkkunen	Finland	
Saw V	David Hackl	Julie Benz, Meagan Good, Shawnee Smith	United States	
Sea Beast	Paul Ziller	Corin Nemec, Christie Laing, Daniel Wisler	United States	
Sebastian's Voodoo	Joaquin Baldwin		United States	Animation
Second Coming	Jose Zambrano Cassella	Ruben Aleman, Haley Boyle, Bettye Keefer	Honduras; United States	
Semum	Hasan Karacadağ	Ayça İnci, Burak Hakkı, Cem Kurtoğlu	Turkey	
Seventh Moon	Eduardo Sanchez	Amy Smart, Tim Chiou, Dennis Chan	United States	
Shark Swarm	James A. Contner	Armand Assante, Daryl Hannah, Heather McComb	United States	
Shark in Venice	Danny Lerner	Stephen Baldwin, Vanessa Johansson, Hilda van der Meulen	United States	Animation
Shutter	Masayuki Ochiai	Joshua Jackson, Rachael Taylor, Megumi Okina, David Denman	United States	Film remake
Slices	Lenny Lenox, Neil McCurry, Lance Polland, Steven Richards, Vito Trabucco	Matthew Olivo, Trent Haaga, Lenny Lenox	United States	
Southern Gothic	Jim Shollenberger	Sarah Hill, Ryan Dusek, Haley Strode	United States	
Spike	Robert Beaucage	Edward Gusts, Sarah Livingston Evans, Anna-Marie Wayne	United States	
Spirits of the Fall	Russ Diapper	Rami Hilmi, Caroline Boulton, Kelly-Marie Kerr	United Kingdom	
Splatter Movie: The Director's Cut	Amy Lynn Best	Debbie Rochon, Nikki McCrea, Elske McCain	United States	
Splinter	Toby Wilkins	Paulo Costanzo, Jill Wagner, Rachel Kerbs	United States	
Spring Break Massacre	Michael Hoffman Jr.	Reggie Bannister, Aly Hartman, Jay Hayden	United States	
Stag Night	Peter A. Dowling	Kip Pardue, Vinessa Shaw, Karl Geary	United States	
The Strangers	Bryan Bertino	Liv Tyler, Scott Speedman	United States	
Strigoi	Faye Jackson	Catalin Paraschiv, Constantin Barbulescu, Rudi Rosenfeld	United Kingdom	
Swamp Devil	David Winning	Mari-Pier Gaudet, Bruce Dern, Cindy Sampson	Canada	
Tales of the Dead	Tim Rasmussen Jr., Merle Johnson	Rachel Grubb, Landyn Banx, Scarlet Salem	United States	
Terribly Happy	Henrik Ruben Genz	Lars Brygmann, Kim Bodnia, Jakob Cedergren	Denmark	
Terror Inside	Joe G. Lenders	Corey Feldman, Tanya Memme, Joe Abby	United States	
Text	Brian McCulley	Hanna Hall, Katrina Miller, Reggie Bannister	United States	
ThanksKilling	Jordan Downey	Wanda Lust, Chuck Lamb, Ryan Francis, Aaron Carlson, General Bastard, Lance Predmore, Natasha Cordova, Lindsey Anderson	United States	
Tokyo Gore Police	Yoshihiro Nishimura	Eihi Shiina, Itsuji Itao, Yukihide Benny	United States; Japan	
Trailer Park of Terror	Steven Goldmann	Priscilla Barnes, Stefanie Black, Jeanette Brox	United States	
Train	Gideon Raff	Thora Birch, Derek Magyar, Gideon Emery, Kavan Reece, Gloria Votsis	United States	
Treevenge	Jason Eisener	Jonathan Torrens, Kristin Slaney, Sarah Dunsworth	Canada	
Tsunami Beach Club	Anthony Fankhauser	Heidi Krilanovich, Herman Sinitzyn, Teresa Berkin	United States	
The Uninvited	Bob Badway	Marguerite Moreau, Zia Harris, Brittany Curran	United States	
Untraceable	Gregory Hoblit	Diane Lane, Colin Hanks, Billy Burke, Joseph Michael Cross	United States	
Vampire Party	Stephen Cafiero, Vincent Lobelle	Julie Fournier, Frédérique Bel, Tchéky Karyo	Belgium; Luxembourg; France	
The Violent Kind	Geoffrey Pepos	Irina Björklund, Tony Longo, Julian Lee	United States	
Vipers	Bill Corcoran	Tara Reid, Genevieve Buechner, Corbin Bernsen	Canada; United States	
Virus Undead (Beast Within)	Wolf Wolff, Ohmuti	Anna Breuer, Alex Attimonelli, Marvin Gronen	Germany	
Wicked Lake	Zach Passero	Carlee Baker, Michael Esparza, Eryn Joslyn	United States	
The Wild Man of the Navidad	Duane Graves, Justin Meeks	Jacob Bargsley, James Bargsley, Kevin Bensmiller	United States	
Wilderness	Amy Neswald	Vivien Kells, Andrew Garman, Kate Greer	United States	
Yeti: Curse of the Snow Demon	Paul Ziller	Crystal Lowe, Carly Pope, Peter DeLuise	Canada; United States	
Yoroi Samurai Zombie	Tak Sakaguchi	Mitsuru Fukikoshi, Issei Ishida, Arata Yamanaka	Japan	
You're Next 3: Pajama Party Massacre	Jason Stephenson	Elske McCain, Joe Knetter, Scarlet Salem	United States	
Zombie Apocalypse Now: A Zombie Hunter	Germán Magariños	Lloyd Kaufman, Verónica Fernandez, Santiago Rivas Cordero	United States	
Zombie Strippers	Jay Lee	Robert Englund, Jenna Jameson, Joey Medina	United States	
