= Cromartie High School =

Japanese manga series

- First tankōbon volume cover, featuring Takashi Kamiyama and the Cromartie High School student body

魁!! クロマティ高校 (Sakigake!! Kuromati Kōkō)
- Genre: Parody; Surreal comedy; Yankī
- Manga
- Written by: Eiji Nonaka
- Published by: Kodansha
- English publisher: NA: ADV Manga
- Imprint: Shōnen Magazine Comics
- Magazine: Weekly Shōnen Magazine
- Original run: August 2, 2000 – May 24, 2006
- Volumes: 17
- Anime television series
- Directed by: Hiroaki Sakurai
- Produced by: Noriko Kobayashi; Masatomo Nishizawa
- Music by: Kunio Suma
- Studio: Production I.G
- Licensed by: NA: Discotek Media
- Original network: TV Tokyo
- English network: NA: Anime Network; UK: Rockworld TV; US: G4 (Anime Unleashed)
- Original run: October 2, 2003 – March 25, 2004
- Episodes: 26
- Manga

Cromartie High School: Staff Room
- Written by: Eiji Nonaka
- Illustrated by: Ino Ichiban
- Published by: Kodansha
- Magazine: Magazine Pocket
- Original run: October 27, 2018 – present
- Volumes: 2
- Live-action film
- Cromartie High – The Movie (2005)
- icon

Cromartie High School (Japanese: 魁!!クロマティ高校, Hepburn: Sakigake!! Kuromati Kōkō; lit. 'Forging Valiantly Ahead!! Cromartie High School') is a Japanese manga series written and illustrated by Eiji Nonaka. It was serialized in Kodansha's shōnen manga magazine Weekly Shōnen Magazine from August 2000 to May 2006, with its chapters collected in 18 tankōbon volumes. It follows the everyday life of Takashi Kamiyama and his odd classmates at Cromartie High School, an infamous school for delinquents. The series is a parody of Japanese yankī manga of the 1970s and 1980s. The style of art resembles Ryoichi Ikegami's works such as Otoko-gumi and Otoko Ōzora.

Both the manga and anime have been released in North America by ADV Manga and ADV Films, respectively. However, the manga was not completely published in North America due to restructuring issues at ADV. Discotek Media has since licensed the anime, after ADV's closing in 2009. The series aired in the United States on the cable network G4 on its Barbed Wire Biscuit late-night block and on the UK satellite channel Rockworld TV. It was followed by a spin-off sequel titled Cromartie Kōkō Shokuinshitsu in 2018, launched on Kodansha's Magazine Pocket app.

Cromartie High School has had over 4.5 million copies in circulation. The manga won the 26th Kodansha Manga Award for the shōnen category in 2002.

== Plot ==
Tokyo Metropolitan Cromartie High School is a highly feared high school and surprisingly full of idiots that has been dubbed "the big league of bad guys" with a selection of delinquents. Takashi Kamiyama, is an honor student, but in order to go to the same high school as his best friend who helped him in high school, he took the entrance exam for Cromartie High School, so Kamiyama ended up entering the school alone.

== Characters ==
=== Main characters ===
Takashi Kamiyama (神山 高志, Kamiyama Takashi)
Voiced by: Takahiro Sakurai (Japanese); Ben Pronsky (English)
Portrayed by: Takamasa Suga
Originally just another above-average student until he decided to enroll at Cromartie. Everyone else at Cromartie assumes that he is the toughest kid in school, since a rabbit would never go into a den of lions. He has ambitions to change the school for the sake of bettering its student body. In secret, he is an amateur comedian who writes and sends jokes to be heard on special radio stations under the penname of "Honey Boy" (ハチミツ, Hachimitsu). In later episodes, he becomes the number one boss in Japan after winning the National Boss Championship, only winning after being the only one to answer the first question correctly. He later defeats the legendary biker Sadaharu in a race.
Shinjiro Hayashida (林田 慎二郎, Hayashida Shinjirō)
Voiced by: Takuma Suzuki (Japanese); Illich Guardiola (English)
Portrayed by: Mitsuki Koga
Kamiyama's first friend at Cromartie, noted for his purple mohawk. Hayashida is the one delinquent that helps Kamiyama blend into the bewildering environment of Cromartie High. Although streetwise, he is dumber than a gorilla and does not even understand basic math. His signature purple mohawk was revealed to be fake in episode 17, but in episode 8 one can see him take it off for a brief second.
Akira Maeda (前田 彰, Maeda Akira)
Voiced by: Tetsu Inada (Japanese); Andy McAvin (English)
Portrayed by: Hiroshi Yamamoto
A delinquent who claims he was always getting into fights and never lost a single one (he claims to have won a 5-against-1 fight), he is ignored and disrespected because he lacks a nickname. He chooses the nickname "Dragon of Razors" with the help of Hokuto's lackey, who himself decides on "The American Dream", though no one else seems to acknowledge those names. Often the most conservative of Kamiyama's friends (and possibly the only one who actually possesses common sense), he is also frequently abducted by delinquents from Bass High School and is often the unwilling host of Cromartie High gatherings at his house. He bears a great resemblance to his mother, whose appearance normally horrifies everyone else. His name is a reference to a famous Japanese wrestler.
Shinichi Mechazawa (メカ沢 新一, Mekazawa Shin'ichi)
Voiced by: Norio Wakamoto (Japanese); Jay Hickman (English)
Portrayed by: Shinji Takeda (voice)
One of the most notorious delinquents of Cromartie. Though there is a rumor that he may be perhaps a robot, no one (excepts Kamiyama, Hayashida, and Maeda) seems to notice, including himself. At one point he ends up in a motorcycle accident and is repaired, only to end up combined with his motorcycle into an even stronger motorcycle, complete with missiles and rocket boosters. He is also known as a smooth-talker and is considered very charismatic, regularly getting first place in popularity polls. He has a little brother, identical but one-fifth his size, named Beta, also known as Mini Mechazawa.
Freddie (フレディ, Furedi)
Portrayed by: Hiroyuki Watanabe
A student with a nearly uncanny resemblance to Freddie Mercury, lead singer of the band Queen. Hayashida claimed that as long as he attended, Cromartie would be the "Olympics for delinquents". Although he never speaks and people assume he is a mute, Freddie actually has a good singing voice and the only occasion people can hear his voice is when he sings (as seen in the manga episode of Mechazawa's birthday). The bottom of the microphone stand is broken, referring to Freddie Mercury's gimmick. He also rides to school on an incredibly large, incredibly powerful, possibly wild horse named Black Dragon (Kokuryu in Japan, a reference to Raoh's horse Kokuoh in Fist of the North Star), which waits outside the bathroom while he is "doing his business".
Gorilla (ゴリラ, Gorira; Hiromi Go (豪 ヒロミ, Gō Hiromi))
A gorilla who appears often at Cromartie High. He sometimes wears a watch and is considered smarter than most of the main characters. It has been revealed that his superior is a monkey. He is also an extremely talented sushi chef. His real name is a reference to a famous Japanese singer. He has also a sister who looks just like him but has prettier eyes and red/pink flower on her left ear.
Yutaka Takenouchi (竹之内 豊, Takenouchi Yutaka)
Voiced by: Ryō Naitō (Japanese); John Gremillion (English)
Portrayed by: Yoshihiro Takayama
The leader of Cromartie High's first-year students. Known to be an incredible fighter and a reliable person. His weakness (unknown to everyone else) is motion sickness. Though he loves field trips and excursions in general, he hates having to travel, because he gets sick very easily, and struggles with all of his might not to vomit. His name is a reference to a famous Japanese actor. His parents are unseen.
Takeshi Hokuto (北斗 武士, Hokuto Takeshi)
Voiced by: Norihisa Mori (Japanese); Jason Douglas (English)
Portrayed by: Noboru Kaneko
A son of a chairman for a major zaibatsu, who is also the chairman of the board for several high schools throughout Japan. He used his father's influence to rule every school he goes to, until he came to Cromartie, not knowing that the school is municipal. He also arrives wearing the wrong uniform (white, instead of the standard black). Despite his setbacks, he continues to plot how to rule this school, if not all of Japan or even the world. As a result of his luxurious, extravagant life, he thinks all people below him are pigs.
Hokuto's lackey (北斗の子分, Hokuto no kobun)
Voiced by: Akio Suyama (Japanese); Greg Ayres (English)
Portrayed by: Sadayoshi Shimane
Nameless in the series. While he does have a name, no one seems to be interested in knowing it (including Hokuto himself), and they simply refer to him as "you", "other guy", or just "Hokuto's lackey". There was actually a controversy among the students, when he said he did not want to be called "Hokuto's lackey". Every time he tries to say his name though, something generally absurd happens and cuts the event short. In the manga, he helps Maeda come up with the nickname "Dragon of Razors", and Maeda suggests for Hokuto's lackey the nickname "The American Dream" (アメリカンドリーム, Amerikandorīmu). They are both satisfied with their new nicknames, but no one else acknowledges them.
Masked Takenouchi (マスクド竹之内, Masukudo Takenouchi)
Voiced by: Takaya Kuroda (Japanese); George Manley (English)
Portrayed by: Itsuji Itao
Before coming to Cromartie, he was a hijacker who tried to commandeer the plane that students of Cromartie High School were taking to go on a field trip to Kyushu. Being agoraphobic, he feels quite uneasy among strangers. When talking with Takenouchi about this problem, he ends up in a situation where he succeeds in the hijacking, but ends up staying in Japan. In the meantime, Takenouchi ends up in the Nevada desert in America. To maintain anonymity, he constantly wears a white wrestling mask, with the kanji character for bamboo, 竹 (The first character in "Takenouchi"), which leaves everyone in Cromartie High with the impression that he is Takenouchi, although no one questions his presence even after being seen alongside the real Takenouchi. He frequently imparts elderly knowledge (being presumedly in his 30s) to the other students when they face contentious issues. In the manga, he becomes the successor of pillow-jutsu, the fictional technique of softening pillows with a sharp blow with a long stick, but this is given only very brief mention in the opening animation of the anime.
Noboru Yamaguchi (山口 ノボル, Yamaguchi Noboru)
Voiced by: Yuuto Kazama (Japanese); James Faulkner (English)
Portrayed by: Shoichiro Matsumoto
The leader of Destrade High School's first-year students. He has the nickname of "The Unsinkable Battleship", which is coincidentally the nickname of professional wrestler Stan Hansen who is extremely popular in Japan, and is mentioned to be a member of a bike gang called "Earth, Wind, Fire, and Water" in his spare time ("Ash, Wind, Fire" in Japan; both are parodies of the American band Earth, Wind & Fire). His cronies believe that he hates jokes, since he is always so serious. In truth, he is a connoisseur of sophisticated humor, despising the sophomoric jokes that his friends prefer. He is also a postcard comedian (someone who sends jokes in the mail to be heard on the radio). His pen name is "Ajishio Taro" (roughly, "Salt Boy"), and he is rivaled only by Kamiyama, who he initially knows only as "Honey Boy." He is easily recognized by his large afro hairstyle and his ever-constant sunglasses.

=== Other characters ===
Jun Ishikawa (石川 淳, Ishikawa Jun)
Voiced by: Yūji Ueda (Japanese); Jacob A. Gragard (English)
Yamaguchi's right-hand man, often beaten by Yamaguchi for telling crude or banal jokes, which Yamaguchi hates.
Pootan (プータン, Pūtan)
Voiced by: Nobuyuki Hiyama (Japanese); Mike MacRae (English)
One half of a comedy duo and the main character of a variety show, which is very popular among delinquents and others, but is scorned by Yamaguchi for being (in his eyes) painfully stupid. The duo wears fuzzy animal suits.
Friend of Pootan (プータンの相棒, Pūtan no Aibō)
Voiced by: Daiki Nakamura (Japanese); Rob Mungle (English)
Glasses-wearing partner of Pootan. He is employed in the show, but he is not allowed to talk about it.
Maeda's Mom (前田母, Maeda Haha)
Voiced by: Megumi Hayashibara
Portrayed by: Hiroshi Yamamoto
Mother of Maeda. She only grunts in the Japanese version and never speaks in the English dub. Her face is identical to Maeda's. She apparently uses the net often, going by the name of "Killer Queen."
Beta Mechazawa (メカ沢 β, Mekazawa Bēta)
Voiced by: Mika Kanai
Also known as Mini Mechazawa or just "Beta", he is the little yet older brother of Shinichi Mechazawa. Mechazawa Beta, who can only say "Meka-ratta" despite being "more advanced", is also a cellphone. Meka-ratta is a parody of the lead character from Obake no Q-tarō, a ghost who is unable to speak human language and hence can only say "bake-ratta." Like Mechazawa, he is often mistaken for something else, such as a tea canister, and is stepped on often due to his small size.
Jackson Setouchi (瀬戸内 ジャクソン, Setouchi Jakuson)
Voiced by: Kiyoyuki Yanada (Japanese); Ernie Manouse (English)
The leader of Bass High School's first-year students. His name is a reference to a famous Japanese nun.
Akio Takejo (竹城 秋夫, Takejō Akio)
Voiced by: Hiroshi Yanaka (Japanese); Ty Mahany (English)
Setouchi's right-hand man.
Akira Nakao (中尾 明, Nakao Akira) and Mick (ミック, Mikku)
Voiced by: Hideyuki Umezu
An expert ventriloquist whose puppet named Mick is newly promoted as the right-hand man by Yamaguchi.
Kiyoshi Fujimoto (藤本 貴一, Fujimoto Kiyoshi)
Voiced by: Tomoyuki Shimura
The leader of Manuel High School's first-year students. At school, he is a ruthless brawler who likes to use aggressive ways to solve problems. But at home, he is a very generous Internet user with a deep concern for netiquette. He also runs a web page/blog/forum that he frequently posts in. His polite behavior on the net, and his answering to "The Troll" (Cromartie High student Tanaka), eventually leads to the humiliating branding of Fujimoto as a shut-in (hikkikomori in Japanese).
Makio Tanaka (田中 牧男, Tanaka Makio; aka The Troll)
Voiced by: Kenichi Suzumura
A student from Cromartie High who trolls Fujimoto's website, calling him to be a hikkikomori. He is also known as the errand boy.

Ken Hirai (平井 健, Ken Hirai)

Voiced by: Masami Kikuchi
A delinquent that got left back. He is 17 years old and older than the regular students at Cromartie High. He is often referred to as "Mr." His name is a reference to popular Japanese artist Ken Hirai
Osamu Kido (城戸 治, Kido Osamu; shares a name with another Japanese wrestler)
Voiced by: Miyu Irino
A big fan of Pootan. He is 10 years old and probably the youngest character.
Sadaharu (貞治)
A legendary biker. He soon retires after being defeated in a race on the highway by Kamiyama and Mechazawa.
Jeeves (じいや, Jiiya)
Hokuto's butler. He seems to bear a striking resemblance to Hayashida. They might be related, though neither of them realize it.
Yo-Chan (ヨッチャン, Yocchan)
A friend of Shinichi Mechazawa (when they were in 6th Garde). He goes to Bass High School.
Mr. Imai
A man that Freddie switches places with.
Mercury
An associate of Yutaka Takenouchi while he was a leader of the Mafia in New York. He has an uncanny resemblance to Freddie, and his name is another reference to Freddie Mercury of Queen. Unlike Freddie, however, he speaks. He also knows about Takenouchi's motion sickness. He also knows a lot of Japanese sayings despite claiming to never have been to Japan. He appears once in the manga, and in a later episode of the anime.
Restaurant Owner
Voiced by: Norio Wakamoto (Japanese); Ernie Manouse (English)
The owner of a small sushi restaurant where the gorilla works. His shop business is going down so his son is trying to get him to sell the shop. The two of them fight until "Gori" shows them how stubborn they are with "banana sushi".
Restaurant Owner's Son
Voiced by: Vic Mignogna
The son of the owner of the small sushi restaurant. He wants his dad to sell the shop until "Gori" shows how stubborn they are with "banana sushi".
Four Kings of Cromartie
A group of second-year students and self-proclaimed leaders of all Cromartie's students, who happen to have five members. All five wear face paints, with four of them resembling members of the rock band Kiss (the final member styles his face paint after professional wrestler The Great Muta). The group appears often in manga, but in only one episode of the anime adaptation.
Fireball of Junior No. 2
A delinquent who was said to be so bad that no one could control him.
Hospitalizer of Junior No. 3
A delinquent who was said to be so bad that whenever he lost his cool he would beat his opponents until they were a bloody mess.
Masa "Victory by Default"
The delinquent who ate all of Kamiyama's pencils on the first day. He is said to be so bad that he never had to fight anyone. This is because he looked so tough that anyone he might have fought got scared and tried to get on his good side.
Ichiro Yamamoto
A friend of Kamiyama's from middle school. He is the whole reason Kamiyama enrolled in Cromartie High School.
Gerotan
The character of a surreal show that comes on when Pootan does not come on. He is known to throw up easily.
Tetsuo
A character who slowly drifts into a scene in the first episode of the anime. In the last episode of the anime, he does so again, then apologizes and introduces himself.

== Media ==
=== Manga ===
Written and illustrated by Eiji Nonaka, Cromartie High School was serialized in Kodansha's shōnen manga magazine Weekly Shōnen Magazine from August 2, 2000, to May 24, 2006. The series is a parody of Japanese "yankī" (juvenile delinquent) manga of the 1970s and 1980s, and the style of art resembles Ryoichi Ikegami's works such as Otoko-gumi and Otoko Ōzora. Kodansha collected its chapters in 17 tankōbon volumes, released from February 16, 2001, to July 14, 2006.

In North America, ADV Manga announced the acquisition of the manga in December 2004. The first volume was published on March 7, 2005. ADV released twelve of the original seventeen volumes, and the last volume was published on November 6, 2007.

A spin-off sequel titled Cromartie Kōkō Shokuinshitsu (クロマティ高校 職員室, Kuromati Kōkō Shokuinshitsu; "Cromartie High School: Staff Room") debuted on October 27, 2018, on Kodansha's Magazine Pocket app. Nonaka authored the manga while the art was drawn by Ino Ichiban. Kodansha released two volumes on March 15 and October 17, 2019.

=== Anime ===
Cromartie High School was adapted into a 26-episode anime television series produced by Production I.G. and aired on TV Tokyo from October 2, 2003, to March 25, 2004. The series was collected into five DVDs released from February 25 to June 25, 2004. The opening theme is "Jun" (純; "Innocent") performed by Takuro Yoshida and the ending theme is "Trust Me" (トラスト・ミー, Torasuto Mī) performed by Bi Kyo Ran.

The series was licensed by ADV Films in 2004. ADV released the series on four DVDs between March 15 and August 16, 2005. The series aired on G4's Barbed Wire Biscuit (Anime Unleashed) block in 2005. In the UK, ADV Film UK released the series on DVD from April 17 to October 16, 2006, and the series also aired on Rockworld TV in 2007. ADV Films ceased operations in 2009. The series was re-licensed by Discotek Media in January 2016. and released on DVD on April 26 of the same year; A Blu-Ray set was released August 29, 2023.

== Reception ==
The manga has had over 4.5 million copies in circulation. Cromartie High School won the 26th Kodansha Manga Award for the shōnen category in 2002. It was one of the Jury Recommended Works in the Manga Division at the 7th Japan Media Arts Festival in 2003. John Oppliger of AnimeNation named the show as one of the best anime comedies of the past 20 years in 2005.
