= Scrawl (film) =

- Official film poster
- Directed by: Peter Hearn
- Written by: Peter Hearn
- Produced by: Annabelle Le Gresley; Peter Hearn
- Starring: Mark Forester Evans; Daisy Ridley; Nathalie Pownall; Elizabeth Boag; Liam Hughes; Joe Daly; Annabelle Le Gresley; Ellie Selwood; Chris Casey
- Cinematography: Matty Crawford
- Edited by: Matty Crawford
- Music by: Dan Hall
- Production companies: Half Day Wednesday Productions; Red Scout Films
- Distributed by: Wild Eye Releasing
- Release dates: 17 October 2015 (Fright Night Film Festival); 11 June 2019
- Running time: 79 minutes
- Country: United Kingdom
- Language: English

Scrawl is a 2015 independent British supernatural horror-thriller film written and directed by Peter Hearn, and produced by Annabelle Le Gresley and Hearn. It stars Liam Hughes, Joe Daly, Daisy Ridley, Mark Forester Evans, Le Gresley, Nathalie Pownall, Catherine Ruddick, Ellie Selwood and Derek Jones. It tells the story of two best friends, Simon and Joe, who must rewrite the happenings from the comic book, Scrawl, after realising that the events occurred from the comic are beginning to happen. It is also Ridley's film debut, being shot just before Star Wars: The Force Awakens. It was released digitally on 11 June 2019 to negative reviews.

== Plot summary ==
Simon is a high school student who makes his own comic books, but soon finds that the deaths depicted in their pages are coming to life, and targeting his friends. The appearance of a mysterious woman who may actually be death incarnate only makes things worse for him as he is forced to face what he has created, while staying alive long enough to rewrite the ending before it's too late.

== Cast ==
- Liam Hughes as Simon Goodman, the main creator and writer of the comic book, Scrawl. He is also Joe's best friend.
- Joe Daly as Joe, the co-creator of Scrawl. He is Simon's best friend.
- Daisy Ridley as Hannah, the mysterious girl from the comic. Hearn stated that at the time of pre-production she was a total unknown until she was cast in the film Star Wars: The Force Awakens. Although The Inbetweeners 2 was slated to be her film debut, the directors decided to remove her scenes from the final cut after she was cast in The Force Awakens, because it meant she was not available for any other scenes. When Scrawl was in the final stages of production, she left the project to focus on her role in Star Wars.
- Annabelle Le Gresley as Annie, Joe's co-scouter with a habit of taking a camera with 'sentimental value' everywhere with her.
- Mark Forester Evans as Frank, Joe's estranged father.
- Ellie Selwood as Rosie, Joe's sister.
- Catherine Ruddick as Charlie, a character in the comic who is the first 'monster' to appear in our world.
- Elizabeth Boag as Georgie
- Chris Casey as Uncle Mike
- Nathalie Pownall as Eve
- Morag Sims as Claire
- Derek Jones as The Caretaker

== Production ==
Scrawl's stylistic production harks back to the 70s and 80s horrors Phantasm and A Nightmare on Elm Street 3: Dream Warriors, as well as fantasy films such as Big. Hearn had been teaching film at Andover College, and conceived the project as a hands-on training exercise for his students, influenced by Brian De Palma's Home Movies. Much like that film, Hearn's students were given the responsibility of raising money (via crowdfunding), as well as shooting and editing the film, all under Hearn's supervision. The cast consisted of professional actors, mostly British, such as Star Wars actress Daisy Ridley, as well as award-winning theatre and film actress Elizabeth Boag, Mark Forester Evans and Nathalie Pownall from the horror film Credo. Both Boag and Pownall had worked before with Hearn on his short film Motto, as well as a previous feature film. Many of the students involved have subsequently gone into the industry or onto film school. The artwork for the film, including the promotional materials as well as the comic book prop, was produced by Jay Boulton.

== Release ==
The film was produced by Half Day Wednesday and Red Scout Films, and played in film festivals and select cinemas between October 2015 and an unspecified month in 2016. A DVD version was due to be released independently in the first quarter of 2017, but neither the cast nor the official website confirmed this. After a fan asked about the film's release, Hearn stated that it would happen in September or October 2017, but no info following this. Sometime later it managed to have a distributor, but still no news afterwards. A DVD version was released to only select people around the production of Hearn's new film, Dead Air. Months later, Wild Eye Releasing acquired the film on late April 2019, and it was released on 11 June 2019.

=== Reception ===
Early premiere reviews gave positive feedback from independent movie reviewers. Dr. Lenera of Horror Cult Films rated the film 8/10 stars, saying it is "a very impressive piece of work considering the circumstances of its making, and is certainly very different to much else that is out there at the moment."

Later retrospective reviews has been mostly negative from audiences and critics, citing its poor writing and dialogue, acting, and its effects. Some gave the benefit of the doubt because it was purposefully a student film, but some state their gripes about its late release for just capitalizing into Daisy Ridley's fame, similar to Sylvester Stallone for The Party at Kitty and Stud's when Rocky was a big hit at the time. Ridley was also viewed for her lackluster performance, but was also the only favorable part of the film. IGN's Tom Jorgensen gave it a 2 stars out of 10, stating that "its story is incomprehensible, it isn't scary at all, and the acting is wall-to-wall bad" and cites that the film "is damn near unwatchable."

=== Awards ===
Hearn was awarded the Phil Tucker Spirit Award by the Zed Fest Film Festival, in Burbank, California.

Festival awards
Festival	Award
Zed Fest Film Festival	Winner Best Director – Peter Hearn; Producer – Annabelle Le Gresley, Peter Hearn; Actor – Mark Forester Evans; Actress – Daisy Ridley; Actress – Nathalie Pownall
Zed Fest Film Festival	Phil Tucker Spirit Award – Director/Producer Peter Hearn
