= Daisy Ridley =

English actress (born 1992)

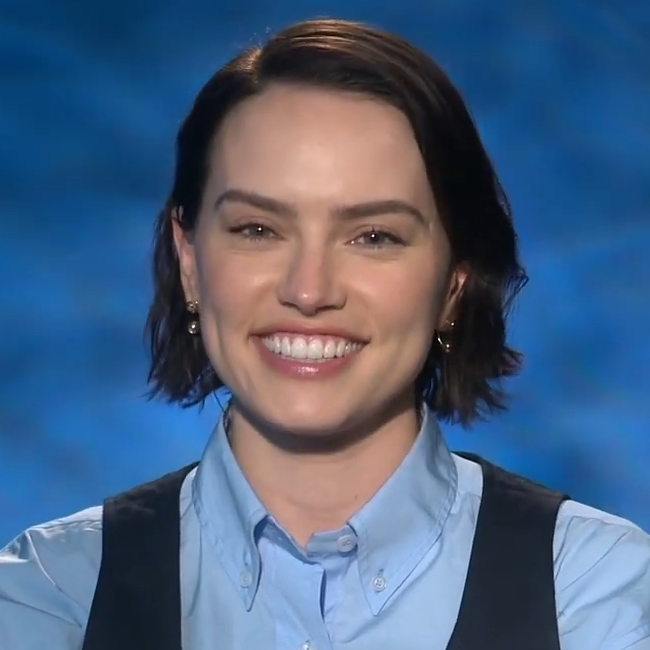
- Ridley in 2024
- Born: Daisy Jazz Isobel Ridley; 10 April 1992 (age 34); London, England
- Occupation: Actress
- Years active: 2013–present
- Spouse: Tom Bateman
- Relatives: Arnold Ridley (great-uncle)

Daisy Jazz Isobel Ridley (born 10 April 1992) is an English actress. She rose to prominence for her role as Rey in the Star Wars sequel trilogy from 2015 until 2019. Following the Star Wars films, Ridley appeared in the mystery film Murder on the Orient Express (2017), and played Ophelia in the romantic drama Ophelia (2018). She had voice roles in the animated film Peter Rabbit (2018) and the video game Twelve Minutes (2021). She subsequently had leading roles in the science-fiction film Chaos Walking (2021), the independent drama Sometimes I Think About Dying (2023), and the psychological thriller The Marsh King's Daughter (2023). She also portrayed Gertrude Ederle in the biographical drama Young Woman and the Sea (2024).

== Early life ==
Ridley was born on 10 April 1992 in the London borough of Westminster, and grew up in Maida Vale. She is the youngest of three daughters born to Christopher Ridley, a photographer, and Louise (née Fawkner-Corbett), who works for a bank. (Note: Attributed to multiple references:) She has two older sisters, Kika Rose and Poppy Sophia, as well as two older half-sisters. Her mother's family, the Fawkner-Corbetts, were landed gentry with a military and medical background. Her great-uncle Arnold Ridley was a playwright and actor, and played Private Godfrey in the television sitcom Dad's Army. Growing up, Ridley's favourite film was Matilda (1996), and she viewed the character Matilda as a role model.

Ridley won a scholarship to Tring Park School for the Performing Arts in Hertfordshire, which she attended from ages nine to eighteen. She then studied classical civilisation at Birkbeck, University of London, before dropping out to focus on her acting career. Prior to being cast in Star Wars: The Force Awakens, Ridley worked as a bartender at two different pubs in London. In 2016, she began studying for a BA in social science through online courses with the Open University.

== Career ==
=== 2013–2015: Beginnings and Star Wars breakthrough ===
Ridley began her career with roles in the television programmes Youngers, Toast of London, Silent Witness, Mr Selfridge and Casualty. She appeared in the short film Blue Season, which was entered into the Sci-Fi-London 48-Hour Film Challenge. Ridley played the lead in the third part of Lifesaver, an interactive film which was nominated for a BAFTA Award. She also appeared in the music video for Wiley's song "Lights On", playing the character of Kim. She made her film debut in the 2015 British independent horror film Scrawl, after her scenes from the British comedy film The Inbetweeners 2 were removed in the final cut.

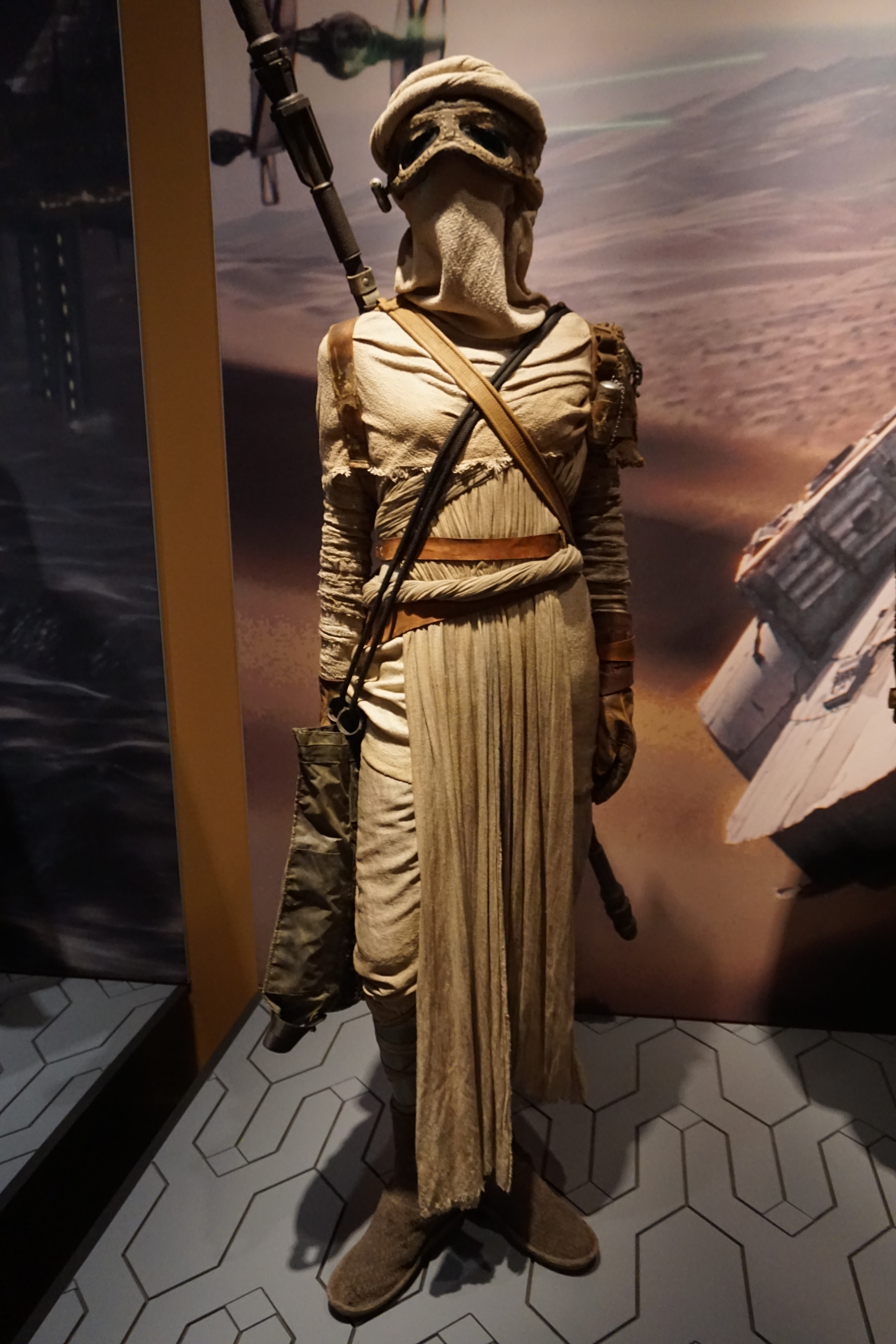
Ridley's costume from Star Wars: The Force Awakens, on display at the Detroit Institute of Arts

In April 2014, it was announced that Ridley had been cast as Rey, one of the lead characters in Star Wars: The Force Awakens (2015). (Note: Attributed to multiple references:) At the time of her casting she was, according to Rolling Stone, a "total unknown". Her choice by director J. J. Abrams was seen as a repeat of George Lucas' move of casting relatively unknown actors for the lead roles in the first Star Wars film in 1977.

Ridley began filming her scenes in May 2014 at Pinewood Studios in Buckinghamshire, and prior to the film's release in December 2015, she appeared at the launch of a set of Star Wars postage stamps issued by the UK postal service Royal Mail, with her character Rey featuring on a stamp along with the droid BB-8. With international revenues of over $2 billion, The Force Awakens was a major box-office hit and the highest-grossing film of 2015. Her performance received critical acclaim, with Richard Roeper describing her portrayal as "a breakout performance" and adding that "[Harrison] Ford has a terrific father figure chemistry [shared] with Ridley and [John] Boyega".

=== 2016–present: Continuing career ===
Ridley became the executive producer of the documentary The Eagle Huntress in January 2016, which premiered at the Sundance Film Festival on 24 January 2016; she also recorded narration for the film's wide release. Ridley was one of several actors featured on Barbra Streisand's 2016 album Encore: Movie Partners Sing Broadway. Along with Anne Hathaway, Ridley and Streisand perform the song "At the Ballet" from A Chorus Line, with Ridley performing the role of Bebe, one of a trio of dancers hoping to be cast in a forthcoming show.

Daisy Ridley and producer Kathleen Kennedy discuss women who work for NASA in 2016

In 2017, Ridley portrayed Mary Debenham in Murder on the Orient Express, an adaptation of Agatha Christie's detective novel of the same name. Directed by and starring Kenneth Branagh, production began in London in November 2016. She also reprised her role as Rey, opposite Mark Hamill as Luke Skywalker, in Star Wars: The Last Jedi, which was released in December 2017.

In January 2018, Ridley starred as Ophelia in Ophelia, a reimagining of the Hamlet tale, alongside Naomi Watts and Clive Owen. The film was shot from April to July 2017 and debuted at the 2018 Sundance Film Festival. In February 2018, Ridley voiced Cottontail in the film Peter Rabbit, an adaptation of the children's book Peter Rabbit by Beatrix Potter. In 2019, Ridley appeared as Rey in Star Wars: The Rise of Skywalker, the last film in the Star Wars sequel trilogy.

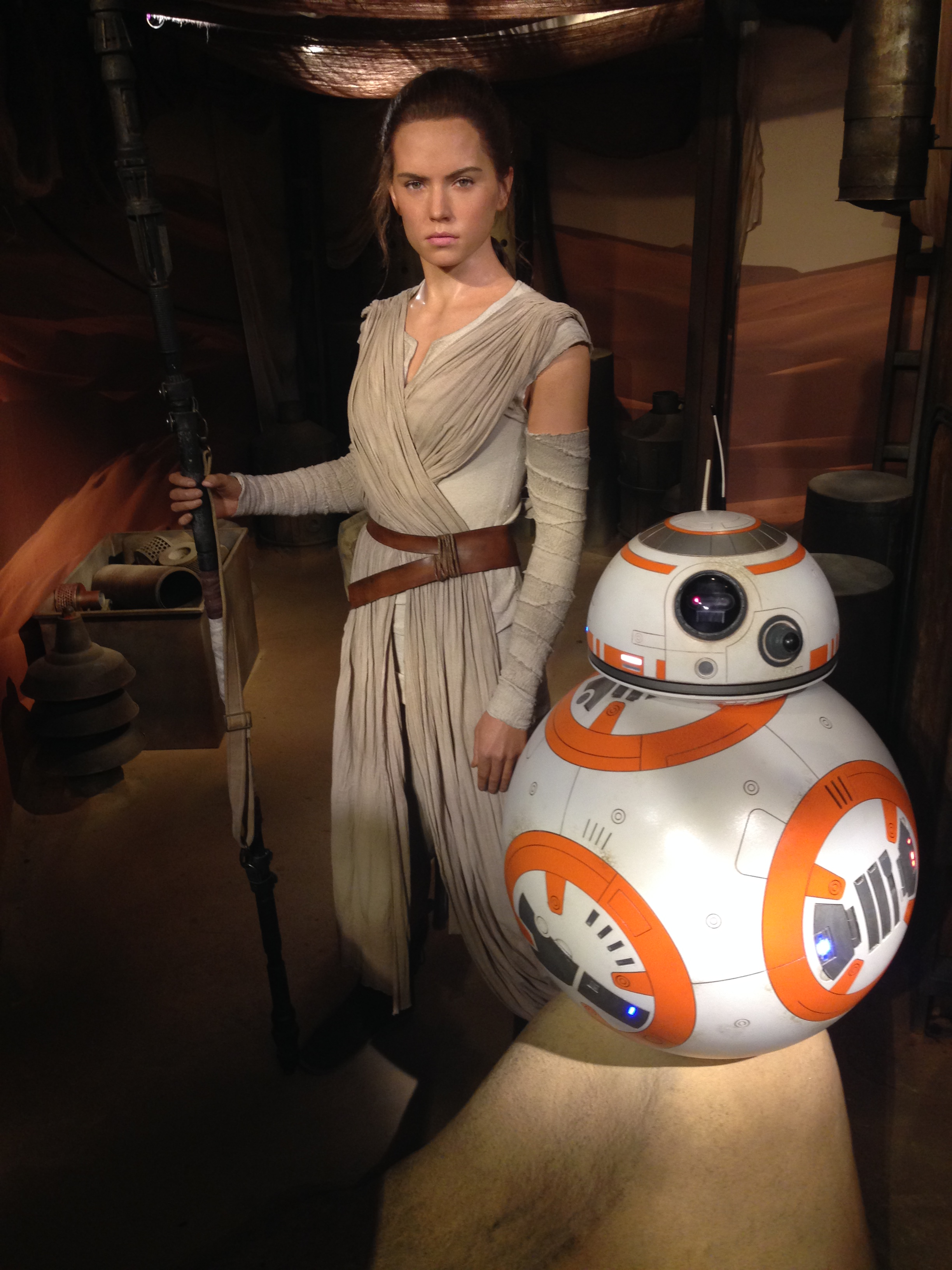
Waxwork of Ridley as Rey (and the droid BB-8) at Madame Tussauds, London

In 2021, Ridley co-starred in the film Chaos Walking, an adaptation of the young-adult novel series Chaos Walking by Patrick Ness. She plays Viola Eade opposite Tom Holland as Todd Hewitt. The film was released on 5 March 2021. The film had been delayed occasionally due to poor test screenings that followed the film's reshoots, and later due to the COVID-19 pandemic. It received negative reviews and was a box-office flop.

She lent her voice to the point-and-click mystery video game Twelve Minutes, alongside James McAvoy and Willem Dafoe. The game received positive reviews, with Ridley's performance being praised by critics. She also made a surprise appearance in Judd Apatow's 2022 movie, The Bubble as Kate, a horny AI. The film received negative reviews.

In July 2023, Ridley was announced as the host of a True Spies podcast miniseries about Lee Harvey Oswald.

Ridley started filming the lead role in The Marsh King's Daughter in Ontario, Canada on 7 June 2021. Filming wrapped on 6 August 2021.

Ridley voiced a character in the French stop motion animated film The Inventor, which was released in the United States on 15 September 2023, and set for a French theatrical release in 2024. In 2021–22, she shot an indie film titled Sometimes I Think About Dying in Astoria, Oregon, with Rachel Lambert directing and Ridley additionally serving as a first-time main producer on the project. She starred in Magpie, a noir thriller written by her partner Tom Bateman, based on Ridley's original story idea. She also starred as Gertrude Ederle in the Disney biopic Young Woman and the Sea.

==== Upcoming projects ====
In 2021, Ridley joined the cast of the science fiction film Mind Fall with Mathieu Kassovitz attached to direct. In 2023, it was revealed at Star Wars Celebration that Ridley would reprise her role as Rey in an upcoming untitled Star Wars film directed by Sharmeen Obaid-Chinoy. In April 2025, production began on Donald Petrie's upcoming romantic comedy The Last Resort, starring Ridley and Alden Ehrenreich.

== Personal life ==
Ridley resides in Primrose Hill, London. Since 2017, she has been in a relationship with actor Tom Bateman, whom she met on the set of Murder on the Orient Express. In January 2023, during the Sundance Film Festival, Ridley confirmed that she and Bateman had married.

Ridley was diagnosed with endometriosis and polyendocrine metabolic ovarian syndrome (PMOS) at age fifteen, requiring her to undergo multiple laparoscopic surgery procedures. The condition left her with low self-confidence due to the acne which followed. (Note: Attributed to multiple references:) In 2023, Ridley was diagnosed with Graves' disease, which resulted in a racing heart rate, weight loss and fatigue, among other symptoms. She has followed a vegan diet since as early as 2017, and she removed gluten from her diet following the Graves' disease diagnosis.

Following the 2016 Teen Choice Awards, which included a tribute to victims of gun violence, Ridley posted a message against gun violence on both Instagram and Facebook. Her post prompted criticism and accusations of hypocrisy in reference to the violence depicted in her Star Wars films. Due to the criticism and comments about her appearance, Ridley deleted her social media accounts. The following year, she said that social media is detrimental to people's mental health, including hers. In 2022, she returned to Instagram after a six-year hiatus.

== Filmography ==
=== Film ===
†	Denotes productions that have not yet been released

Year	Title	Role	Notes	Ref.
2013	Lifesaver	Jo	Short film	
2013	Blue Season	Sarah	Short film	
2013	100% BEEF	Girl	Short film	
2013	Crossed Wires	Her	Short film	
2014	Under	Waitress	Short film	
2014	The Quiet Ones	Jane Harper / Evey Dwyer	In a still mock photograph in end credits; credited as an artist	
2015	Scrawl	Hannah		
2015	Star Wars: The Force Awakens	Rey		
2016	Only Yesterday	Taeko Okajima	Voice role (English dub)	
2016	The Eagle Huntress	Narrator	Documentary film; also executive producer	
2017	Murder on the Orient Express	Mary Debenham		
2017	Star Wars: The Last Jedi	Rey		
2018	Ophelia	Ophelia		
2018	Peter Rabbit	Cottontail Rabbit	Voice role	
2019	Star Wars: The Rise of Skywalker	Rey		
2020	Asteroid Hunters	Narrator	Documentary film	
2021	Chaos Walking	Viola Eade		
2022	The Bubble	Kate	Cameo appearance	
2023	Sometimes I Think About Dying	Fran Larsen	Also producer	
2023	The Inventor	Marguerite	Voice role	
2023	The Marsh King's Daughter	Helena Pelletier (née Holbrook)		
2024	Magpie	Anette	Also producer and story writer	
2024	Young Woman and the Sea	Gertrude Ederle	Also executive producer	
2025	We Bury the Dead	Ava Newman		
2025	Butterfly Journey	Narrator	Documentary film	
2025	Cleaner	Joanna "Joey" Locke		
2025	Grande Envie	The Countess	Short film	
2026	Ebenezer	Clara		
2027	The Last Resort †	Brooke	Post-production	
TBA	The Good Samaritan †	Dr. Rosalind Carver	Filming	
TBA	Cupid †		Filming	

=== Television ===
Year	Title	Role	Notes	Ref.
2013	Casualty	Fran Bedingfield	Episode: "And the Walls Come Tumbling Down"	
2013	Youngers	Jessie	Episode: "A to B and the Apology"	
2013	Toast of London	Charlotte	Episode: "Vanity Project"	
2014	Silent Witness	Hannah Kennedy	Episodes: "Fraternity: Parts 1 & 2"	
2014	Mr. Selfridge	Roxy Starlet	Episode: "#2.8"	
2017–2018	Star Wars Forces of Destiny	Rey	Voice role; 10 episodes	
2026	We Were There	Narrator	Docuseries; 8 episodes	
TBA	The Christie Affair	Nan O'Dea	Lead role; upcoming series	

=== Theatre ===
Year	Title	Role	Notes
2010	The Boy Friend	Nancy	Musical
2012	Dominoes	Daisy	

=== Music videos ===
Year	Artist(s)	Title
2013	Wiley	"Lights On"

=== Video games ===
Year	Title	Voice role	Ref.
2015	Disney Infinity 3.0	Rey	
2016	Lego Star Wars: The Force Awakens	Rey	
2017	Star Wars Battlefront II	Rey	
2020	The Dawn of Art	Narrator	
2020	Baba Yaga	Magda	
2021	Twelve Minutes	Wife	

=== Theme park attractions ===
Year	Title	Role	Venue
2019	Star Wars: Rise of the Resistance	Rey	Disney's Hollywood Studios; Bay Lake, FL
2020	Star Wars: Rise of the Resistance	Rey	Disneyland; Anaheim, CA

== Awards and nominations ==
Year	Association	Category	Nominated work	Result	Ref.
2015	Zed Fest Film Festival	Outstanding Acting Performance	Scrawl	Won	
2015	Florida Film Critics Circle	FCC Breakout Award	Star Wars: The Force Awakens	Won	
2016	Central Ohio Film Critics Association	Breakthrough Film Artist	Star Wars: The Force Awakens	Nominated	
2016	Georgia Film Critics Association	Breakthrough Award	Star Wars: The Force Awakens	Nominated	
2016	EDA Awards	Best Female Action Star	Star Wars: The Force Awakens	Nominated	
2016	EDA Awards	Best Breakthrough Performance	Star Wars: The Force Awakens	Nominated	
2016	Nickelodeon Kids' Choice Awards	Favorite Movie Actress	Star Wars: The Force Awakens	Nominated	
2016	Empire Awards	Best Female Newcomer	Star Wars: The Force Awakens	Won	
2016	MTV Movie Awards	Best Female Performance	Star Wars: The Force Awakens	Nominated	
2016	MTV Movie Awards	Best Hero	Star Wars: The Force Awakens	Nominated	
2016	MTV Movie Awards	Best Breakthrough Performance	Star Wars: The Force Awakens	Won	
2016	MTV Movie Awards	Best Fight (with Adam Driver)	Star Wars: The Force Awakens	Nominated	
2016	Saturn Awards	Best Actress	Star Wars: The Force Awakens	Nominated	
2016	Teen Choice Awards	Choice Movie Actress – Sci-Fi/Fantasy	Star Wars: The Force Awakens	Nominated	
2016	Teen Choice Awards	Choice Movie: Chemistry (with John Boyega)	Star Wars: The Force Awakens	Nominated	
2016	Teen Choice Awards	Choice Movie: Breakout Star	Star Wars: The Force Awakens	Won	
2018	Empire Awards	Best Actress	Star Wars: The Last Jedi	Won	
2018	Nickelodeon Kids' Choice Awards	Favorite Movie Actress	Star Wars: The Last Jedi	Nominated	
2018	MTV Movie Awards	Best Performance in a Movie	Star Wars: The Last Jedi	Nominated	
2018	MTV Movie Awards	Best Hero	Star Wars: The Last Jedi	Nominated	
2018	Saturn Awards	Best Actress	Star Wars: The Last Jedi	Nominated	
2018	Teen Choice Awards	Choice Fantasy Movie Actress	Star Wars: The Last Jedi	Nominated	
2018	Teen Choice Awards	Choice Drama Movie Actress	Murder on the Orient Express	Nominated	
