= Ernie Manouse =

American broadcaster (born 1969)

- Born: September 1, 1969 (age 56); Binghamton, New York
- Occupation: Television host
- Employer: HoustonPBS
- Known for: InnerVIEWS with Ernie Manouse
- Website: ernieontv.com

Ernie Manouse (born September 1, 1969, in Binghamton, New York) is an American television host, radio personality, writer and producer. He currently hosts the interview show InnerVIEWS with Ernie Manouse, produced by HoustonPBS. His work with HoustonPBS has met critical acclaim in the southern United States, earning him numerous KATIE awards and regional Emmy Awards.

== Early life ==
Manouse was born Ernest David Manouse in Binghamton, New York. He is of Greek descent. After graduating from high school, and despite being accepted to Massachusetts Institute of Technology with a perfect math SAT score, he attended Loyola University Chicago and studied to be a music video director. While in college, he guest-hosted Outlook, a Chicago-based radio show, with a classmate. Their radio presentation received such a positive reaction that Outlook hired them permanently.

== Career ==
Manouse began his career in television with NBC Network News, before moving to radio at WLS and WLUW in Chicago. He returned to TV at HoustonPBS, and has since worked his way through many aspects of talk shows, from screening calls on the call-in radio shows Sex Talk, and The Phyllis Levy Show, to hosting his own brand of chat and magazine programs.

In 1996, Ernie moved to Houston, Texas, and spent six years hosting and producing the daily magazine program WeekNight Edition, which evolved into WeekDAY and became Houston's most celebrated local television program, earning multiple Emmy and Houston Press Club awards. Manouse shared with Matthew Brawley the 2006 Katie Award for "Outstanding Interview/Talk Show" for the southern region.

In October 2002, Manouse helped to create and produce the local primetime magazine show The Connection, which he hosted for two years. In 2004, Manouse launched the syndicated series InnerVIEWS with Ernie Manouse. This award-winning series is distributed nationally to PBS stations across the country and airs in more than 100 cities in the U.S. and the Virgin Islands. The show features Manouse in unedited, one-on-one interviews with noted personalities such as Patti LuPone and Jamie Foxx. Manouse thoroughly researches his guests before interviewing them and arranges an informal setting to encourage spontaneous discussion.

Another area of broadcasting that Manouse has explored is late night talk, and on February 9, 2005, Manouse launched The After Party, combining arts coverage and light-hearted interviews reminiscent of Johnny Carson and Jack Paar. The show received positive reviews from both critics and audiences alike, garnering the coveted Emmy nomination for "Best Entertainment/Variety program" in its first season. The program ended its run on November 15, 2006, after over 50 episodes.

In 2006, Manouse produced and anchored A Conversation on RACE for HoustonPBS. He also produced the political Red, White & Blue and moderated the 2002 Houston Mayoral Debates, the 2008 Texas Supreme Court Judicial Debate, and the 2008 Texas US Senate Debate. In 2009, Manouse became the anchor and producer of Houston 8, a weekly current events discussion series. He also hosted the 2009 HoustonPBS Spelling Bee, the largest regional qualifying spelling bee for the national Scripps Spelling Bee.

After seven nominations for the Lone Star (Texas) regional chapter of the Emmy Awards, Manouse won three Emmys in 2009. He won for Best Information Series and Best On-Air Talent. He also won an Emmy for his work on the Houston Spelling Bee in the category of Best Event Coverage. He has won an additional two awards over the last few years, bringing his Emmy total to five. Manouse is also a voice actor. He has done the English voiceovers for over a dozen Japanese anime videos produced by ADV Films, including Gilgamesh, Le Chevalier D'Eon, and Cromartie High School.

== Community involvement ==
Manouse is an active member of the Houston LGBT community. Manouse has hosted community events such as the U.S. Military Ball and the Cattle Baron's Ball and served as a conversationalist at the University of Houston Honors College Great Conversation. He serves on the advisory board of both Stages Repertory Theatre and Dominic Walsh Dance Theater. He served as Vice President of Public Affairs for the Greater Houston United Services Organization (USO). He was also vice president of the Houston Gay and Lesbian Film Festival.
