= Nu-Meri: Book of the New Spawn =

- Directed by: Yûichi Kanemaru
- Starring: Chiharu Komatsu
- Release date: 2008
- Country: Japan
- Language: Japanese

Nu-Meri: Book of the New Spawn (哀憑歌 〜NU-MERI〜, Aihyôka: Nu-meri) is a 2008 Japanese horror film directed by Yûichi Kanemaru and starring Chiharu Komatsu.

== Cast ==
- Chiharu Komatsu
- Gô Ibuki
- Ai Fukaya
- Ippei Kanie
- Mitsuki Koga

== See also ==
- List of horror films of 2008
