= Eiji Nonaka =

Japanese manga artist and humorist

- Born: 野中英次; February 21, 1965 (age 61) Tokyo
- Notable works: Cromartie High School
- Collaborators: Maru Asakura
- Official website (archived on May 1, 2012)

Eiji Nonaka (野中 英次, Nonaka Eiji) is a Japanese manga artist and humorist. Eiji writes and illustrates shōnen and seinen manga. His work appears in several manga magazines published by Kodansha.

His most popular serial, Cromartie High School, ran in Weekly Shōnen Magazine from 2001 to 2006. The serial won Eiji the 2002 Kodansha Manga Award in the shōnen category. In 2003, it was a jury selection in the seventh annual Japan Media Arts Festival. That same year, an animated series based on the serial premiered on TV Tokyo. A live-action feature film, called Cromartie High – The Movie, followed in 2005. A spin-off sequel titled Cromartie Kōkō Shokuinshitsu ("Cromartie High School Staff Room") debuted on October 27, 2018, on Kodansha's Magazine Pocket app. Nonaka authored the manga while the art was drawn by Ino Ichiban.

Kodansha republished the serial in 17 paperback volumes (tankōbon). From 2001 through 2006, they released two or three volumes per year as the story progressed. ADV Manga published English translations of the first 12 volumes in 2005–2007; the first four of these were nominated for a 2006 Eisner Award in the category "Best U.S. Edition of Foreign Material".

Although Eiji usually illustrates his own work, his shōnen serial Double-J (2009) is illustrated by Maru Asakura (亜桜まる). Double-J was adapted into an animated miniseries, which aired on Nippon TV in 2011.

== Manga series ==
=== Shōnen ===
- Super Baseball Club (1991)
- Charge!! Cromartie High School (魁!!クロマティ高校, Sakigake!! Kuromati kōkō) [2000]
- Mechasawa-kun (メカ沢くん) [2004]
- Future Neighborhood Association (未来町内会, Mirai chonaikai) [2006]
- Double-J (だぶるじぇい, Daburu jei) [2009]
- The Toughest! FANTA: Legend of a Band (最強!FANTAバンド伝説, Saikyō! FANTA bando densetsu) [2010]
- Cromartie High School Staff Room (クロマティ高校 職員室, Kuromati Kōkō Shokuinshitsu) [2018]

=== Seinen ===
- The Life and Times of an Idiot Section Chief (課長バカ一代, Kachō baka ichidachi) [1996]
- Dream Mechanic (ドリーム職人, Dorīmu shokunin) [1998]
- Cactus (しゃぼてん, Shaboten) [2000]
- The Life and Times of an Idiot Section Chief for Children (課長バカ一代 子供用, Kachō baka ichidachi kodomoyō) [2001]
- Feather Duster (ハタキ, Hataki) [2007]
- Red Sky, White Sea (赤い空 白い海, Akai sora shiroi umi) [2008]

== See also ==
- Ryoichi Ikegami
