= Meteor (miniseries) =

- Genre: Science Fiction, Disaster
- Written by: Alex Greenfield
- Directed by: Ernie Barbarash
- Starring: Billy Campbell, Marla Sokoloff, Christopher Lloyd, Ernie Hudson, Kenneth Mitchell, Mimi Michaels, Tiffany Hines, Michael Rooker, Jason Alexander
- Theme music composer: Jonathan Snipes
- Country of origin: United States
- Original language: English
- No. of episodes: 2

Production
- Producers: Juan Mas; Tony Roman
- Editors: Tricia Gorman; Mike Witting
- Running time: 188 minutes
- Production companies: Alpine Medien Productions; Larry Levinson Productions; Grand Army Entertainment

Original release
- Network: NBC
- Release: July 12 – July 19, 2009

Meteor is a 2009 American science-fiction disaster television miniseries. It was directed by Ernie Barbarash, written by Alex Greenfield, and distributed by RHI Entertainment, in association with Alpine Medien Productions, Larry Levinson Productions, and Grand Army Entertainment. Shot in the United States, the series stars Marla Sokoloff, Michael Rooker, Billy Campbell, Stacy Keach, Christopher Lloyd, Kenneth Mitchell, Ernie Hudson, Mimi Michaels, and Jason Alexander. The story is about the asteroid 114 Kassandra, which is on a collision course with Earth. Its surrounding meteorites crash into various locations worldwide, including the small town of Taft, California, while the military is having little success eliminating it.

The first part of the series was broadcast on the NBC network July 12, 2009, and the second part aired a week later on July 19, 2009.

== Plot ==
Astronomer Dr. Lehman (Christopher Lloyd), and his assistant, Imogene O'Neill (Marla Sokoloff), race against time to provide vital information to JPL rocket scientist Dr. Chetwyn (Jason Alexander). Dr. Lehman worked for Chetwyn until Chetwyn fired him, and Lehman is the only one who is authorized to prevent the impending destruction. Lehman gets hit by a car and Imogene strives on alone, encountering various murderers and automotive failures. Amidst the chaos, Detective Jack Crowe (Billy Campbell) desperately searches for his psychotic ex-partner Stark (Michael Rooker) before the madman seeks his revenge against Jack by killing Jack's father and daughter. Meanwhile, Jack's father, the police sheriff (Stacy Keach) of the town of Taft, deals with subsiding the panic in his town as the meteor shower continues. Another subplot involves a family struggling for survival in a meteor-struck hospital.

After the United States launches numerous nuclear weapons at the approaching asteroid, Imogene discovers a flaw in Dr. Lehman's algorithm and finds that 114 Kassandra had been split in two by the comet that knocked it out of orbit. The second half of Kassandra is larger than the first, and the military's nuclear arsenal is already nearly depleted from destroying the first half, which was believed to be the whole meteor.

As the meteor draws closer to Earth, the meteor storms surrounding it cause increasing amounts of damage as they occur at an unstoppable pace. Part of the headquarters of the scientists tracking Kassandra is hit, resulting in Dr. Chetwyn's death.

Imogene finds herself as the only one left who can save the world from destruction, but she can no longer contact the government by any traditional means of communication. After being abducted by and escaping from Stark with Jack's help, she finds a radio tower that can be used to reach the remaining scientists at the base, but Stark unexpectedly returns, having survived being shot due to a bulletproof vest he had previously stolen, and he cuts the signal to lure Jack out. By the time that Stark is finally shot dead from a shotgun, by the sheriff and Jack, and the signal is restored, Kassandra has entered Earth's atmosphere. The government decides to launch their remaining missiles in combination with the Russians and Chinese and accept the consequences - massive meteor storms that will still cause catastrophic damage. However, Imogene comes up with a new plan at the last minute, one which initially appears to have failed as Kassandra is not destroyed. It quickly becomes clear, however, that Imogene's plan instead deflected Kassandra harmlessly out of the Earth's atmosphere, saving the planet.

Three months later, Imogene joins Jack's family for dinner. Imogene warns Jack that a "next time" will occur in 2027, when an asteroid named AN-1999 passes within about 200,000 miles of Earth. If scientists' calculations are one degree off or something knocks the asteroid off of its course, it could hit the Earth.

== Cast ==
- Stacy Keach as Police Chief Crowe
- Marla Sokoloff as Imogene O'Neill
- Christopher Lloyd as Dr. Daniel Lehman
- Jimmy "Jax" Pinchak as Michael "Mike" Hapscomb
- Ernie Hudson as General Brasser
- Kenneth Mitchell as Russell "Rusty" Hapscomb
- Mimi Michaels as Jenny Crowe
- Michael Rooker as Calvin Stark
- Erin Cottrell as Dr. Chelsea Hapscomb
- Anne Nahabedian as Claire Payne
- Ariel Gade as M. Keely Payne
- Alex Paez as Lieutenant Finn
- Paola Turbay as Nurse Huxley
- Tiffany Hines as Maya
- Sam Ayers as Captain Finnegan
- Wyatt Smith as Roadside Boy
- Natalie R Ridley as Police Dispatcher
- Billy Campbell as Detective Jack Crowe
- Jason Alexander as Dr. Nathan Chetwyn
- Zachary Bryan as Deputy Kosey
- Camille Chen as Lieutenant Quigley
- Eugene Davis as Whitaker
- Harrison Knight as Buck
- Cindy Ambuehl as Cheryl
- Chancellor Miller as Trent
- Carmen Argenziano as Border Police Murphy
