= Double-J (manga) =

Japanese manga series

- First tankōbon volume cover, featuring Hajime Usami

だぶるじぇい (Daburu Jei)
- Genre: Comedy
- Manga
- Written by: Eiji Nonaka
- Illustrated by: Maru Asakura
- Published by: Kodansha
- Imprint: Shōnen Magazine Comics
- Magazine: Weekly Shōnen Magazine
- Original run: July 22, 2009 – October 26, 2011
- Volumes: 6
- Anime television series
- Directed by: Azuma Tani
- Studio: DLE
- Original network: Nippon TV (Yuruani?)
- Original run: June 29, 2011 – September 14, 2011
- Episodes: 11

Double-J (Japanese: だぶるじぇい, Hepburn: Daburu Jei) is a Japanese manga series written by Eiji Nonaka and illustrated by Maru Asakura. It was serialized in Kodansha's shōnen manga magazine Weekly Shōnen Magazine from July 2009 to October 2011, with its chapters collected in six tankōbon volumes. A four-minute-long 11-episode anime adaptation, produced by DLE, was broadcast on Nippon TV as part of their Yuruani? program from June and September 2011.

== Plot ==
In a school where after-school activities are mandatory for all students, Hajime and her friend Sayo come across a club that they have never seen before: the Cultural Activity Preservation Club. Members make handicrafts, such as mats and toothpicks, using traditional methods.

== Characters ==
=== Traditional Art Inheritance Club ===
Hajime Usami (宇佐美 はじめ, Usami Hajime)
Voiced by: Ayuru Ōhashi
Hajime is a new club member.
Sayo Arima (有馬 小夜, Arima Sayo)
Voiced by: Emiri Katō
Sayo is Hajime's close friend. However, she has not yet joined the traditional art inheritance club.
Aya Chōsokabe (長宗我部 彩, Chōsokabe Aya)
Voiced by: Kanami Satō
Aya is the vice-president of the traditional art inheritance club. She has written a text of the omikuji.
Maria Sassa (佐々 マリア, Sassa Maria)
Voiced by: Chiaki Omigawa
Maria, often referred to as 'Tsumayōji-san' by other members, is a senior of the club. She has carved a groove of the toothpick.
Ema Hōjō (北条 絵馬, Hōjō Ema)
Voiced by: Ayana Taketatsu
Ema is a senior of the club, and is a successor of the rain gutter artisan.
Ichirō Toba (鳥羽 一郎, Toba Ichirō)
Voiced by: Nobuyuki Hiyama
Ichirō is the president of Nagashima High School's traditional art inheritance club. He is Toba Sōjō's descendant, and has succeeded to Chōjū-giga.
Shizuma Sanada (真田 静馬, Sanada Shizuma)
Voiced by: Ryō Hirohashi
Shizuma is a trainer of the varied tit.

=== Manzai Study Group ===
Françoise Sakai (フランソワーズ 坂井, Furansowāzu Sakai)
Voiced by: Yū Kobayashi
Françoise is the president of the manzai study group.

=== Members' Family ===
Hajime's Mother (はじめの母)
Voiced by: Miyu Matsuki
Ichirō's Father (一郎の父)
Voiced by: Banjō Ginga
Yutaka Toba (鳥羽 ゆたか, Toba Yutaka)
Voiced by: Kaori Ishihara
Yutaka is Ichirō's younger sister.

== Media ==
=== Manga ===
Written by Eiji Nonaka and illustrated by Maru Asakura, Double-J was serialized in Kodansha's shōnen manga magazine Weekly Shōnen Magazine from July 22, 2009, to October 26, 2011. Kodansha collected its chapters in six tankōbon volumes, released from January 15, 2010, to December 16, 2011.

=== Anime ===
A four-minute-long 11-episode anime adaptation, produced by DLE and directed by Azuma Tani, was broadcast on Nippon TV's animated shorts program Yuruani? from June 29 to September 14, 2011. The ending theme is "Wani to Shampoo" (ワニとシャンプー) by Momoiro Clover Z. An insert song, titled "Kyō no Hi wa Sayōnara" (今日の日はさようなら), performed by the voice actors of Hajime Usami, Sayo Arima, Aya Chōsokabe, Maria Sassa, Ema Hōjō, Shizuma Sanada, Françoise Sakai, and Yutaka Toba, played in the final episode.

==== Episodes ====
No.	Title	Original release date
1	"Dentō or Alive"; Transliteration: "Dentō oa Araibu" (Japanese: 伝統・オア・アライブ)	June 29, 2011
2	"PermaDentō Vacation"; Transliteration: "PāmaDentō Bakēshon" (Japanese: パーマ伝統・バケーション)	July 6, 2011
3	"Dentō Derivative"; Transliteration: "Dentō Deribatibu" (Japanese: 伝統デリバティブ)	July 13, 2011
4	"Traditional Dentō Offering"; Transliteration: "Kabushiki Dentō Kōkai" (Japanese: 株式伝統公開)	July 20, 2011
5	"ADentō Please!"; Transliteration: "ADentō Purīzu!" (Japanese: ア伝統 プリーズ！)	July 27, 2011
6	"I Accidentally Slipped on Dentō"; Transliteration: "Ukkari Subette Dentō" (Japanese: うっかり滑って伝統)	August 3, 2011
7	"Traditional Dentō of Daily Life"; Transliteration: "Kurashi no Dentō Gei" (Japanese: 暮らしの伝統芸)	August 10, 2011
8	"That Matter is Inside Dentō"; Transliteration: "Sono Ken wa Dentōchu desu" (Japanese: その件は伝統中です)	August 17, 2011
9	"The Dentō Gland was Swollen"; Transliteration: "Dentōsen ga Hareta" (Japanese: 伝統腺が腫れた)	August 24, 2011
10	"Dentō Eiji"; Transliteration: "Dentō Eiji" (Japanese: 伝統英二)	August 31, 2011
11	"Prime Minister's Dentō Statement"; Transliteration: "Shushō Dentō Shokan" (Japanese: 首相伝統所感)	September 14, 2011
