= Jessicka Rabid =

- Directed by: Matthew Reel
- Written by: Matthew Reel
- Story by: Elske McCain
- Produced by: Cisiany Olivar
- Starring: Elske McCain; Trent Haaga
- Edited by: Matthew Reel
- Music by: Mario Salvucci
- Distributed by: Troma Entertainment
- Release date: November 28, 2010 (United States)
- Running time: 82 minutes
- Country: United States
- Language: English

Jessicka Rabid is a 2010 American horror film directed by Matthew Reel about an inbred, intellectually disabled girl who contracts rabies from a dog bite after years of being treated like a dog by her abusive, incestuous white trash family. A sequel, titled Jessicka Rabid 2: Infected, was slated for a 2014 release, but was later cancelled.

== Plot ==
Jessicka is a mute and intellectually disabled young woman that lives with her cousins Marley and Brad Hoffman. They mistreat and abuse her on a regular basis, subjecting Jessicka to beatings and rape when they aren't locking her up in a dog cage and treating her like a pet. It's only after Jessicka is bitten by a rabid dog that she begins to turn on her cruel captors and the porn director they pimp her out to.

== Cast ==
- Elske McCain as Jessicka
- Trent Haaga as Marley Hoffman
- Jason Foster as Billy
- Cisiany Olivar as Abby Hoffman
- Keith Marcellus Parham as Dick Black
- Faith Preston as Denise
- Matthew Reel as Porn Director
- Jeff Sisson as Brad Hoffman
- Mike Wyatt as Mike

== Reception ==
The Oklahoma Gazette panned Jessicka Rabid, stating that "This Troma pick-up really makes I Spit on Your Grave look like high art by comparison." DVD Talk gave a mixed review, stating that "Jessicka Rabid is not a film for everyone, or indeed for most people. Fans of the genre will find a lot to like, others very little."
