= Cromartie High – The Movie =

- Theatrical release poster
- Directed by: Yūdai Yamaguchi
- Written by: Itsuji Itao (structure); Shōichirō Masumoto (screenplay); Eiji Nonaka (manga)
- Based on: Cromartie High School by Eiji Nonaka
- Produced by: Chikako Nakabayashi; Shin Torisawa
- Starring: Takamasa Suga; Mitsuki Koga; Kai Atō; Kenichi Endō; Hiroyuki Watanabe; Tak Sakaguchi
- Cinematography: Shuji Momose
- Music by: Toshiyuki Omori
- Production companies: King Records; The KlockWorx; Media Arts; Suplex
- Distributed by: Media Suites
- Release date: 23 July 2005 (Japan)
- Running time: 85 minutes
- Country: Japan
- Language: Japanese

Cromartie High – The Movie (Japanese: 魁!! クロマティ高校 THE★MOVIE, Hepburn: Sakigake!! Kuromati Kōkō The Movie) is a 2005 Japanese surreal comedy satire film directed by Yūdai Yamaguchi (who had previously made Battlefield Baseball) and starring Takamasa Suga. The film is based on the manga Cromartie High School by Eiji Nonaka which had also been previously adapted as an anime series.

== Plot synopsis ==
The film opens with a black-and-white documentary-like section which recounts the checkered past of Cromartie High, built in 1920 and destroyed six times since then. Then on to the present day school full of violence and thugs, a school so desperate for students, they even enroll a gorilla and a bad-tempered robot. Takashi Kamiyama (played by Takamasa Suga), a top student, comes to the school to try to join his hapless friend Yamamoto (Tak Sakaguchi in a cameo role) but Yamamoto can't even pass the entrance exams for Cromartie so Kamiyama is left to go it alone. His efforts to improve the school include starting a Global Defense Force to protect earth from aliens. The aliens when they do arrive are space apes Gori (screenwriter Shōichirō Masumoto in a furry suit) and Lla (both straight out of the 1971 TV series Spectreman) and the plot becomes a series of parodies of science fiction films, martial arts movies and high school comedies among others.

== Production ==
Director Yamaguchi has said that the author of the original manga, Eiji Nonaka told him to "Do whatever you want" when he learned that a film was to be made of the manga. Yamaguchi took him at his word and did not read the manga or look at the anime version before directing his film. Because of the episodic nature of the original manga, the screenplay took a year and a half to write.

The name of Cromartie High School was taken from the American baseball player Warren Cromartie who was a star player in Japan for a number of years. Cromartie was unhappy that his name was being used for a school of thugs and delinquents and in 2005 filed an injunction to delay the screening of the movie. The film's director Yamaguchi was able to reach a compromise with Cromartie to allow screening of the film as long as a disclaimer was added that no real person was involved. Cromartie said he still intended bringing a civil suit.

== Cast ==
- Takamasa Suga as Takashi Kamiyama
- Mitsuki Koga as Shinjirō Hayashida
- Hiroshi Yamamoto as Akira Maeda / Maeda's Mother
- Ryūji Akiyama as Makio Tanaka
- Kai Atō as Kai Atō
- Tomoaki Azuma as Sho
- Hiroyuki Baba as Tanaka's friend
- Kenichi Endō as Pootan 1
- Shinya Hashimoto as Hustle King Shinya Hashimoto
- Itsuji Itao as Masked Takenouchi
- Mika Kanai as Mechazawa Beta (voice)
- Noboru Kaneko as Takeshi Hokuto
- Shōichirō Masumoto as Space Apeman Gori / Noboru Yamaguchi
- Tak Sakaguchi as Ichiro Yamamoto
- Yoshihiro Takayama as Yutaka Takenouchi
- Shinji Takeda as Shin'ichi Mechazawa (voice)
- Kanji Tsuda as Interviewer A
- Hiroyuki Watanabe as Freddie

English voice cast

- Ruben Arvizu as Mechazawa Beta / Priest / Lla
- Bob Buchholz as Takenouchi
- Richard Cansino as Takashi Kamiyama
- Peter Doyle as Takeshi Hokuto
- Grant George as Hayashida
- Taliesin Jaffe as Hokuto's Henchman / Ippo / Member 1
- Dan Lorge as Hijacker / Actor 1
- Yuri Lowenthal as Ichiro Yamamoto / Mashiba
- Dave Mallow as Masa
- Michael McConnohie as Shinichi Mechazawa / Narrator
- Kristen Rutherford as Woman Islander / Bride
- Patrick Seitz as Ladies Man / Sendo
- Doug Stone as Gori / Actor 2 / Noburo Yamaguchi / Electrician
- Ezra Weisz as Maeda
- Dan Woren as Kai Atō

== Release ==
Cromartie High was shown at the 9th Puchon International Fantastic Film Festival on July 17, 2005. The movie was released theatrically in Japan on July 23, 2005, by Media Suites and the Japanese DVD was issued on January 2, 2006, by King Records (キングレコード).

The New York premiere of Cromartie High School was in June 2006 at the 2006 New York Asian Film Festival, presented by Subway Cinema. Soon afterwards in July 2006, an English-subtitled and English-dubbed DVD was released by Tokyo Shock as Cromartie High - The Movie.

== Reception ==
Todd Brown at Twitch Film gave a very positive review calling the film "deliriously fun stuff" with a "fantastic visual style" and "jammed with bursts of stylish action, visual gags, film references and as much plain old oddity as Yamaguchi can possibly jam in there."

However, Josh Ralske at AllMovie was disappointed by director Yamaguchi's "haphazard approach to his source material" and lack of focus but does say the film "provides a few genuinely clever and amusing off-the-wall moments".

Another reviewer is more positive but stresses that the film is mainly for devotees of the manga and anime series and that the uninitiated may be unimpressed. The review concludes: "As sophomoric and cheap-looking as it is, Sakigake! Cromartie High School is also good, clean, impenetrable fun. Just make sure that you're a fan".

The reviewer for Mania gives the film a B− rating but also maintains that it is mostly for fans and that it "needs some familiarity in order to really enjoy a lot of it.

Another take is the review on CinemaEye which gives it 4 stars with the comment "CROMARTIE HIGH SCHOOL doesn't make sense whatsoever. That is the true charm of it. The team behind this knew exactly what they were doing. Extremely entertaining on every level if you just roll with it. It is too bizarre but they sure make you laugh."
