= Twelve Minutes =

2021 video game

- Cover art for Twelve Minutes, created to reflect the influences of Alfred Hitchcock, Stanley Kubrick, and David Fincher, among others.
- Developer: Luís António
- Publishers: Annapurna Interactive; Netflix (iOS, Android)
- Writers: Luis Antonio; Steve Lerner
- Composer: Neil Bones
- Engine: Unity Engine
- Platforms: Windows; Xbox One; Xbox Series X/S; Nintendo Switch; PlayStation 4; PlayStation 5; iOS; Android
- Release: Windows, Xbox One, Xbox Series X/S; August 19, 2021; PlayStation 4, PlayStation 5, Nintendo Switch; December 7, 2021; iOS, Android; December 13, 2022
- Genre: Adventure
- Mode: Single-player

Twelve Minutes is an adventure game developed by Luís António and published by Annapurna Interactive. It was originally released on August 19, 2021, for Windows, Xbox One and Xbox Series X/S, with versions for Nintendo Switch, PlayStation 4 and PlayStation 5 released on December 7, 2021. A version for iOS and Android mobile devices was published by Netflix on December 13, 2022.

The game takes place almost exclusively in a small apartment suite and requires the player to repeatedly play through events of a 12-minute cycle to attempt to solve a mystery.

== Gameplay ==
Twelve Minutes is played from a top-down view of an apartment suite. Here, the husband and wife are dancing.

Twelve Minutes is played from a top-down perspective and is set in an apartment suite shared by a husband and wife (voiced by James McAvoy and Daisy Ridley, respectively) which includes the main living and kitchen area, their bedroom, a bathroom, and a closet. The player controls the husband during these events in the style of a point-and-click adventure game, where he is free to do various actions. Without doing certain actions, over the course of 12 minutes, the husband learns his wife is pregnant. A self-identified cop (voiced by Willem Dafoe) arrives at the apartment and accuses the wife of murdering her father several years ago, and in trying to arrest her knocks out the husband and kills the wife and her unborn child.

Time resets at the point where the husband enters the apartment, with the player now free to attempt to figure out why the cop suspects the wife of murder, how to prevent her arrest, or several other possible actions in order to find a way to end the loop. If the husband dies or leaves the apartment, time is reset. However, the player is not given any exact information of what this goal is, leaving it up to them to find a way to resolve the situation. The husband is the only character that retains knowledge of the prior cycles (such as knowing about the impending arrest) and this information can be used to perform other actions in future cycles. This gameplay loop has been compared to The Legend of Zelda: Majora's Mask. While the main loop lasts only 12 minutes in real time, the game is expected to take the player between 6 and 8 hours to complete.

== Plot ==
Twelve Minutes is a decision-driven game involving time loops. However, the order of events will differ depending on how the game plays.

A husband returns to his apartment after work and is greeted by his wife, who surprises him with the news that she is pregnant. As they start to celebrate, a man claiming to be a cop knocks at the door and proceeds to arrest them both. He accuses the wife of murdering her father and stealing an expensive pocket watch eight years ago. The cop then strangles the husband to death, only for the husband to suddenly find himself back to the start of the evening after, trapped in a time loop. If the husband dies, leaves the apartment, or runs out of time, he returns to the start of the evening.

After finding the hidden watch in the apartment and proving he is reliving the same evening to his wife, she eventually confesses her secret past. The wife tells him that shortly after she was born, her father had an affair with the nanny, resulting in a child being born. The discovery of the affair and the existence of an illegitimate child drove her mother into a deep depression and eventually death. Years later, during a heated argument on Christmas Eve, she accidentally shot her father with a gun and ran away, afraid of the consequences.

The husband eventually questions the cop and learns he was a close friend of his wife's father. The cop's daughter has cancer, and he wants to sell the pocket watch to pay for her treatment. The cop's version of how the father died is also different. The father survived being shot on Christmas Eve, but someone else returned on New Year's Eve and killed him with the same gun. Realizing his wife did not commit murder, the husband finds a way to prove his wife's innocence to the cop. The three characters talk peacefully and deduce the killer was the wife's brother from the affair.

Unfortunately, the loop still repeats, so the husband focuses on finding the brother's identity. By interrogating the cop with this new information, he learns that his mother, whom he had never met, was the nanny. In shock, his repressed memories return, and he relives that fateful New Year's evening eight years ago. He confronts the man who took care of him and confesses he has fallen in love with his daughter, only to learn that this man is his father, and the daughter is his half-sister. Unable to cope with the truth, a struggle ensues, and he accidentally shoots his father and flees.

Using the watch to reverse time, the husband returns to reality, where he is still talking to his father about falling in love with his half-sister. The time loops are revealed to be the husband imagining a positive future with his wife, and the cop is a manifestation of his father's interference. If the husband refuses his father's proposal to leave his half-sister, the scuffle repeats and he accidentally breaks his father's neck, and the loops continue to repeat. If the husband decides to accept his father's proposal, he enters a loop where the apartment is empty and he is alone. If the husband recites a book that the wife was reading during the loops, the father offers to help him to forget his half-sister, causing the loops to reset and begin anew. Finally, if the husband recites that same book once more, then stares at the clock before choosing to forget, the father tells him to stop his imaginary future, ending all the time loops.

== Development ==
The game's logo

Luís António is a former artist from Rockstar Games and Ubisoft who left these companies to pursue independent game development. He spent time in 2012 working to help develop The Witness before setting out to make his own. For his first game, he wanted a title that would explore the consequences of decision-making and how these choices affected others. António also considered that most video games are built on loops, with the player-character dying and the player using knowledge from the previous deaths to proceed further in the game, a concept built into the time looping nature of Twelve Minutes.

He had initially envisioned a game that took place in a small neighborhood over the course of 24 hours, but this proved to be too large in scope for himself, and he scaled it back to a single apartment suite and a much shorter amount of time. Much of the design of the game is inspired by film director Stanley Kubrick, and as one nod to Kubrick, the lobby area around the apartment includes the iconic carpet pattern Kubrick had used in the Overlook Hotel for The Shining. Additional inspiration came from the films Groundhog Day, Memento, and Rear Window. António also took inspiration from Filth, a film starring McAvoy in which the lead character keeps getting into increasingly worse situations while trying to rectify others. Other film directors that helped to establish the psychological thriller alongside Kubrick like Alfred Hitchcock and David Fincher were also influential to the design. António, along with advertising firm mOcean, designed the poster as a homage to films from these directors.

António had premiered the game at the 2015 PAX East event. At this point, the game used placeholder art, but the gameplay loop was complete. The game was given an honorable mention for the Seumas McNally Grand Prize at the Independent Games Festival in 2016. António had planned for the game to be released in 2016. However, in the intervening years, António brought on a team of five to help refine the game, and obtained publishing support from Annapurna Interactive. The game was re-shown during the Xbox press conference from Microsoft during E3 2019, and with a planned release for 2020. Among final elements to be included are fully voiced lines for the main characters, and improved character animations using motion capture. As he finalized the game's design, António took a reductionist approach, removing gameplay elements to focus on the essentials he wanted. For example, António originally had timepieces within the game world for the player to anticipate when events would happen, but later removed these, leaving it up to the player to follow conversations and other cues to know when events are meant to happen and prepare for them.

Voice acting for the game was provided by James McAvoy, Daisy Ridley, and Willem Dafoe as the husband, wife, and the officer, respectively. Annapurna Interactive helped with casting as well as finding safe locations for them to record lines which came just as the general world lockdown due to the COVID-19 pandemic had started.

António stated an anticipated release by the end of 2020 for Windows, Xbox One and Xbox Series X/S, with ports to other systems later. In November 2020, Annapurna Interactive confirmed that the game was delayed to 2021, and was released on August 19, 2021. Versions for Nintendo Switch, PlayStation 4 and PlayStation 5 were announced on November 23, 2021. They were released on December 7, 2021. A version for iOS and Android mobile devices was published by Netflix on 13 December 2022.

The game was showcased at the 2021 Tribeca Film Festival, where it competed for the inaugural Tribeca Games Award.

== Reception ==
Reception

Aggregate scores
Aggregator	Score
Metacritic	(PC) 76/100 (XONE) 71/100 (XSX) 74/100 (PS5) 64/100 (NS) 63/100
OpenCritic	53% recommend

Review scores
Publication	Score
Adventure Gamers	3/5
Destructoid	8/10
Electronic Gaming Monthly	4/5
Game Informer	8/10
GameSpot	9/10
GamesRadar+	4.5/5
Hardcore Gamer	4/5
IGN	8/10
PC Gamer (US)	53/100
RPGFan	75/100
Shacknews	8/10
The Guardian	4/5
VG247	4/5

Twelve Minutes received "generally favorable" reviews for Microsoft Windows, but received "mixed or average" reviews for Xbox One, Xbox Series X, PlayStation 5, and Nintendo Switch according to review aggregator website Metacritic. (Note: Attributed to multiple sources:) OpenCritic determined that 53% of critics recommend the game.

Hideo Kojima praised Twelve Minutes, stating he had not "been into a game this much since Inside", and had inspired him to consider making another adventure game.

Some reviewers expressed strong criticism of the amount of domestic violence, particularly when it is forced onto the wife in order to progress in the game. Renata Price of Kotaku stated that while it was possible a story could include this type of violence if it was well crafted, its inclusion within Twelve Minutes was "pretentious and exhausting", and considered the twist ending "terrible". According to Polygon's Samit Sarkar, the staff at Polygon were split whether the violence was necessary to serve the story, but Sarkar was also concerned with the lack of any disclaimers related to the violence or other troublesome topics at the start of the game. Twelve Minutes had been released near the same time as Boyfriend Dungeon, which on its initial release had also received similar criticism related to darker, mature content that had not been alluded to through pre-release materials or in-game content warnings. Both games were considered examples of where proper in-game content warnings would be necessary to warn players about disturbing content before encountering it.

Twelve Minutes has been considered a fresh take into the ‘point-and-click’ genre using a very small space for exploration with the ability to tell a story in a unique way. IGN's Ryan McCaffrey compared it to a "fresh twist on the genre" and flipping the traditional point-and-click adventure on its head while GameSpot's Andrew King saw it as "mechanically rich while encouraging creative thinking".

=== Awards ===
Year	Award	Category	Result	Ref
2016	Independent Games Festival	Seumas McNally Grand Prize	Honorable mention	
2019	Clio Awards	Gold Winner - Game Play Trailer	Won	
2021	Tribeca Film Festival	Best Game	Nominated	
2021	Golden Joystick Awards	Best Storytelling	Nominated	
2021	Golden Joystick Awards	Xbox Game of the Year	Nominated	
2021	The Game Awards	Best Independent Game	Nominated	
2021	Steam Awards	Most Innovative Gameplay	Nominated	
2021	Clio Awards	Silver Winner - Twelve Minutes - Making Of Featurette	Second Place	
2021	VGChartz	Best Puzzle Game of 2021	Nominated	
2021	Unity Awards	Best Desktop / Console Game	Nominated	
2022	SXSW Gaming Awards	Excellence in Audio Design	Nominated	
2022	Webby Awards	Best Game Design	Nominated	
2022	Webby Awards	Best User Experience	Nominated	
2022	Webby Awards	Best Puzzle and Trivia Games	Top of sub category	
