= Elske McCain =

American actress

- Born: Elske McCain; September 4, 1976 (age 49); Yuma, Arizona, United States
- Occupations: film director actress producer
- Years active: 1994–present

Elske McCain (born September 4, 1976) is an American film director, actress, producer and screenwriter.

== Biography ==
Born in Yuma, Arizona, McCain began watching films at an early age and aspired to become an actress. In 2004 McCain was cast in 'Goat Sucker' by local filmmaker Matt Reel. On October 8, 2006, she was a contestant of the Fox Reality Channel series The Search for the Next Elvira. She has since directed and produced her own films, including the films Creep Creepersins 'Vaginal Holocaust'. She directed her first film in 2009 entitled "Stripping For Dummies". The film features Independent actress Scarlet Salem.

== Filmography ==
Actress:

- Silent Fury (1994)
- The Getaway (1994)
- The Goat Sucker (2005)
- All the French Are Whores (2006)
- Poultrygeist: Night of the Chicken Dead (2006)
- You're Next 3: Pajama Party Massacre (2007)
- Gimme Skelter (2007)
- Splatter Movie: The Director's Cut (2008)
- Caged Lesbos A-Go-Go (2009)
- Amateur Porn Star Killer 3D: Inside the Head (2009)
- Defective Man! (2009)
- Jessicka Rabid (2009)
- Trade In (2009)
- Halfway to Hell (2009)
- Incest Death Squad (2009)
- Vaginal Holocaust (2009)
- Killer Biker Chicks (2009)
- Strip Club Slasher (2009)
- Welcome to my Darkside! – Women in Horror (2009)
- The Dead Light District (2010)

Producer:

- Jessicka Rabid (2009)
- All the French Are Whores (2006)
- The Goat Sucker (2005)

Director:

- Stripping For Dummies (2009)
