= Rhea Bailey =

English actress (born 1983)

- Born: 12 July 1983 (age 43); Leeds, West Yorkshire, England
- Occupation: Actress
- Years active: 1999–present
- Partner: Darren Everest (engaged)
- Children: 1

Rhea Bailey (born 12 July 1983) is an English actress. She is best known for her roles as PC Mel Ryder in The Bill between 2008 and 2010, and Caz Hammond in Coronation Street in 2015 and 2016.

Her other television roles include Chloe Simms on the soap opera Crossroads, former student Yasmin Deardon in BBC school drama Waterloo Road, Jade in the Torchwood episode "Out of Time", Jazz in the movie Credo (also known as The Devil's Curse) and DC Lisa Goodall in the ITV series Blue Murder.

== Early and personal life ==
She is the younger sister of singer Corinne Bailey Rae. Her father is Kittitian and her mother is English.

In March 2023, Bailey became engaged to Darren Everest of The Overtones. They have a daughter, born September 2021.

== Filmography ==
=== Films ===
Year	Film	Role	Notes
2008	Credo	Jazz	Known in the US as The Devil's Curse

=== TV ===
Year	Show	Role	Notes
2000	Cold Feet	Julie Clements	2 episodes #3.4 & #3.5
2000	Children's Ward	Emma	Recurring
2001–2002	Crossroads	Chloe Simms	Series regular
2003	Casualty	Liz Merryman	1 episode: "End of the Line: Part 1"
2004	Donovan	Donna	1 episode: "Donovan"
2004	Doctors	Rebecca Seagrove	1 episode: "The Birds and the Bees"
2006	Eleventh Hour	Housing Estate Mother	1 episode: "Resurrection"
2006	Waterloo Road	Yasmin Deardon	Recurring; 4 episodes
2006	Torchwood	Jade	1 episode: "Out of Time"
2006–2007	Blue Murder	DC Lisa Goodall	Series regular
2007	Doctors	Stella Parkman	Recurring; 3 episodes: "An Inconsolable Loss", "Hammer Blow" & "Smells Like Teen Spirit"
2008–2010	The Bill	PC Mel Ryder	Series regular
2012	The Mentalist	Amanda Shaw	1 episode: "If It Bleeds, It Leads"
2015–2016	Coronation Street	Caz Hammond	Regular role; 72 episodes
2018	Girlfriends	Corrine	2 episodes #1.3 & #1.4
2018	Hetty Feather	Brody	Regular role (series 4)
2025	Emmerdale	Anna Finsbury	
