= Nathalie Pownall =

British actress

- Born: Bristol, England, United Kingdom
- Occupation: Actress
- Years active: 2000–present

Nathalie Pownall is a British Actress and Film Maker.

== Early life ==
She grew up in Bristol and was a member of the Bristol Old Vic Youth Theatre before moving to London to train professionally.

== Career ==
Nathalie has an acting career that spans Film, Television, Theatre and Audio.

=== Film and television ===
She has appeared as a guest lead in BBC series Casualty, Doctors and ITV's Doc Martin with Martin Clunes. In 2008, she played Maia Sturn, the solo role in an online viral series 'Emergency Subnet' for Channel 4 to promote and launch the American Animated series Afterworld in the UK.

She also played Timmy in British Horror Credo (The Devil's curse USA). She also played Eve in the 2015 film Scrawl.

On 1 December 2022, she appeared in an episode of the BBC soap opera Doctors as Gweneth Lully.

=== Voice Work ===
Alongside commercial work, She was the voice for the Crystal Palace Dinosaur Trail and various audio tracks for the English Heritage and National Trust.

In 2017, Nathalie pioneered a series of female voiced audio devotionals from the Passion Translation of the Bible and with the endorsement of Broadstreet Publishing. They were launched Internationally through audible.

She has also been the narrator of several audio books.

== Other Ventures ==
=== Charitable ===
In 2006 she helped set up Tutuma, a charitable initiative led by leading HIV medical professionals and Actors, that ran theatre and dance workshops for orphans in Zimbabwe. The same year Tutuma was commissioned to perform Zimbabwe's first production of Closer by British Playwright Patrick Marber play at HIFA - Harare International Festival of the Arts.

=== Mentoring ===
Nathalie also serves as a Chaplain in a young offenders prison. Inspired by an experience growing up, she created and produced 'Wake-Up' alongside 8 of the young men that she mentors. The film was written by the 8 men to challenge societies stereotypes of what it means to be a young man in prison. Nathalie's vision was awarded funding from the Mayor of London and upon completion, the short film garnered the interest of Amazon Prime where it was made available to stream.
