= Mitsuki Koga =

Japanese actor (born 1975)

- 虎牙光揮
- Born: January 16, 1975 (age 50); Aizuwakamatsu, Japan
- Occupation: Actor

Mitsuki Koga (虎牙光揮, Koga Mitsuki, born January 16, 1975), is a Japanese actor who is known to be featured in films that involve martial arts. He trained in Muay Thai, Karate and Boxing before starting his acting career.

Best known for his portrayals as Kyosuke Akiba in Godzilla: Tokyo S.O.S., Shinjiro Hayashida from Cromartie High - The Movie, and Tetsuki Yamato/Kamen Rider Ketaros in the 2006 Tokusatsu movie, Kamen Rider Kabuto: God Speed Love.

He was also featured as a main character in the film adaptation of Futaro Yamada's novel Koga Ninpocho, Shinobi: Heart Under Blade, And was a part of the stunt performers for The Last Samurai. He also recently made a minor/cameo role in The Fast and the Furious: Tokyo Drift as a Yakuza bodyguard.

== Filmography ==
=== Films ===
- Godzilla: Tokyo SOS (2003) – Kyosuke Akiba
- Cromartie High: The Movie (2005) – Hayashida Shinjiro
- Shinobi: Heart Under Blade (2005) – Chikuma Koshiro
- Kamen Rider Kabuto: God Speed Love (2006) – Tetsuki Yamato/Kamen Rider Ketaros
- The Fast and the Furious: Tokyo Drift (2006) – Yakuza bodyguard
- Nu-Meri: Book of the New Spawn (2008)
- Ultraman Ginga (2013) - Gō Ōsato
- Bushido Man (2013) - Takanori Tsujimoto
- Live (2014)
