= Death on Demand =

- Directed by: Adam Matalon
- Written by: Kevin Burke
- Produced by: Kevin Burke
- Cinematography: Peter Scheer
- Edited by: Timothy Donovan
- Music by: Adam Blau
- Release date: July 8, 2008
- Running time: 90 minutes
- Country: United States
- Language: English
- Budget: $250,000 (estimated)

Death on Demand is a 2008 horror film, directed by Adam Matalon and distributed by MTI Home Video. It is the first release from the Evil Twins production company.

== Plot ==
A live webcast from a reportedly haunted house turns into a supernatural killing spree when the ghost of a murderous mountaineer returns to finish what he started when he slaughtered his entire family twenty years prior. It's been two decades since mountaineer and ice climber Sean McIntire turned the tools of his trade on his unsuspecting family, but grim legends die hard in small towns and the locals remain fearful at the mere mention of his name.

Now, an unscrupulous young entrepreneur named Richard is seeking to cash in on this gruesome legend by staging a special Halloween webcast live from McIntire House. Three young couples will attempt to spend a night in the long-abandoned property, but only one will walk away with $5000 in prize money. When the ratings prove less than stellar, Richard attempts to spice things up by throwing a randy porn star into the mix.

Later, after a group séance in which the participants revive the spirit of Sean McIntire, they split up into groups and search for the clues that will help them win the competition. His supernatural strength growing thanks to the mystic powers granted to him by Himalayan monks, McIntyre chases the last remaining contestants into the darkened attic of the home as horrified viewers all over campus watch in abject horror.

== Cast ==
- Jerry Broome as Sean McIntyre
- Elisabeth Jamison as Darla
- Anne McDaniels as Tammy
- Brandon Goins as Brad
- Krista Grotte as Velvet Luv
- Josh Folan as Biff
- Sara Christal as Haydn

== Reception ==
DVD Verdict says that "Death on Demand isn't the worst film ever. Indeed, had it relied a little less on such lazy set-ups for each kill, it may have attained guilty pleasure status. As it is though, Death on Demand is a forgettable experience that, for me at least, left a bad taste in the mouth due to that last scene". Dread Central gave 2 out of 5, stating that "The effort was good, the idea was sound but boring someone to tears before things get good is a serious step backwards, nearly trampling all the hard work put into it.".
