= Jerry Broome =

American actor

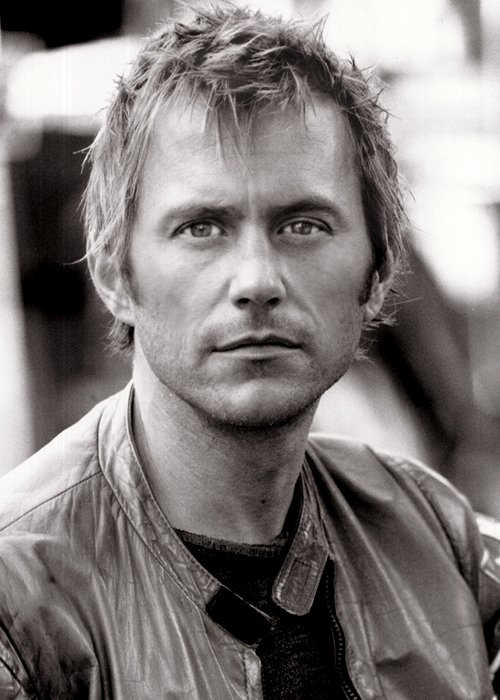
Jerry Broome

Jerry Broome (born February 28, Waco, Texas) is an American actor. He first starred in the short film Sixty Cups of Coffee (2000) in Dallas, Tx. In 2001 moved to NYC to study with William Esper and The Actors Movement Studio. His first feature film, the 2008 horror movie Death on Demand, played Sean McIntyre, the killer/ghost. He has appeared on several soap operas One Life to Live, All My Children and had several recurring roles on "The Young and the Restless". Now resides in his home town Austin, Tx.
