= Boogeyman 3 =

2008 film directed by Gary Jones

- Official DVD cover
- Directed by: Gary Jones
- Written by: Brian Sieve
- Produced by: Andrew Pfeffer
- Starring: Erin Cahill; Chuck Hittinger; Mimi Michaels
- Cinematography: Lorenzo Senatore
- Edited by: John Quinn
- Music by: Joseph LoDuca
- Production companies: Ghost House Pictures; Stage 6 Films
- Distributed by: Sony Pictures Home Entertainment
- Release dates: October 18, 2008 (Screamfest Film Festival); January 20, 2009 (United States)
- Running time: 94 minutes
- Countries: United States; Belgium
- Language: English
- Budget: $3 million
- Box office: $156,941

Boogeyman 3 is a 2008 supernatural horror film directed by Gary Jones and starring Erin Cahill, Chuck Hittinger, and Mimi Michaels. It is the third and final installment of the Boogeyman film series, sequel to Boogeyman (2005) and Boogeyman 2 (2007) and centers on a college sophomore, Sarah Morris, who tries to convince her dorm that the Boogeyman is real. Little does she know that the more she tells people of the existence of the Boogeyman, the evil supernatural force becomes stronger. The film is a co-production between the United States and Belgium.

== Plot ==
While taking a shower, Dr. Mitchell Allen's daughter, Audrey, sees a hand with a black glove. Scared, Audrey gets out and goes to her room to sleep. Her dog, however, is up and wants to play ball. She throws the ball in the closet; after a while, she gets worried her dog has not come back yet. She walks to the closet and finds blood lining it. She backs away and gets pulled under her bed, screaming.

Sarah Morris is a student doing a show for her college radio station where she tries to help people with their problems, such as a guy just breaking up with his girlfriend. Soon after she is introduced, Audrey arrives in Sarah’s room at night, raving that “He’s everywhere.” Sarah lets her stay the night. During Sarah’s radio show the next day, Audrey calls to tell Sarah and Dr. Kane about the Boogeyman. They don’t believe her, but Sarah goes to find her, thinking she is suicidal, while Dr. Kane remains with her on the phone. The Boogeyman then begins to strangle Audrey when Sarah arrives. When others come to see it, Audrey appears to have hanged herself.

Soon after, Sarah discovers a diary among Audrey’s things. Upon reading it, she believes the Boogeyman exists and tries to warn her friends Lukas, Jeremy, Ben, Lindsey, and her boyfriend, David. They refuse to believe her, thinking she is dealing with the trauma of her friend dying soon after her mother‘s death. Her friends in the dorm begin to die gruesomely. Lukas has his face impaled on a broken bong, Jeremy gets broken in half and squashed into a locked trunk (after following an apparition of Lukas), and Ben is killed by spinning fan blades after crawling into the ventilation system. Sarah has visions of their deaths through being pulled into the Boogeyman's alternate world.

People refuse to believe her claims, but campus talk of the Boogeyman from hearing her radio show continues to swirl. Sarah begins to feel the Boogeyman gains his power from the legend continuing by people believing he might be real. Dr. Kane starts to worry about her mental stability. Sarah takes over the radio station to warn the students away, prompting her arrest by campus security. While held in custody, Dr. Kane negotiates her release until the body of Sarah’s friend Lindsey is found in a washer. Sarah realizes Dr. Kane is beginning to believe when they witness a light manifestation of the Boogeyman. Dr. Kane, trying to prove she is wrong, enters the room where the light is and is subsequently beaten to death by the Boogeyman. Sarah then realizes the Boogeyman uses her fear to warn everyone to believe in him.

Sarah rushes back to her room to save David, who now believes her story and has been reading the diary. She finds him staring off into a black closet but fails to prevent the Boogeyman from pulling him in. David is soon flung out into the room, disemboweled, covering her in blood. The police and students arrive to find the scene. To prevent the Boogeyman’s growth in power, Sarah claims she committed all the murders herself and that the Boogeyman is not real. One of the officers in the elevator reveals he does not believe she could have done that by herself. She insists she did, but the elevator stops, and she is pulled up into the elevator shaft by the Boogeyman while the two police officers stare in disbelief.

One year later, Amy and Jennifer are staying in Sarah’s room. Amy interrupts Jennifer's studies to tell her the story of the “crazy girl” (Sarah) who thought the Boogeyman was real that lived in the room a year ago. The college changed the dorm name to keep people from being afraid to move in. Jennifer leaves to go to the library for some peace, noticing that Amy seems scared to be alone and taunts her as she leaves. Left alone, Amy is soon attacked and dragged by the Boogeyman beneath her bed to an unknown fate.

== Cast ==
- Erin Cahill as Sarah Morris
- Chuck Hittinger as David
- Mimi Michaels as Lindsay
- George Maguire as Jeremy
- WB Alexander as Lukas
- Matt Rippy as Roger Kane
- Nikki Sanderson as Audrey Allen
- Elyes Gabel as Ben
- Galina Talkington as Katie
- Jayne Wisener as Amy
- Kate Maberly as Jennifer
- Nikolai Sotirov and Vladimir Yossifov as Boogeyman

== Reception ==
=== Box office ===
The film received a $156,941 gross earnings worldwide.

=== Critical response ===
Adam Hakari from Reel Talk gave a negative review when compared with its predecessor. Steve Barton of Dread Central gave the film a 3 out of 5 score and commenting that "It’s a nice sized step in the right direction".
