= Chuck Hittinger =

American actor (born 1983)

- Born: Charles William Hittinger; February 12, 1983 (age 43); Pittsburgh, Pennsylvania, United States
- Other name: William Hittinger
- Occupation: actor
- Years active: 2005–present

Chuck Hittinger (born February 12, 1983) is an American actor. He is known for playing Sean Ackard in Pretty Little Liars (2010–11), as Van Dyke Tosh in Jonas, and as Matt, the son of Ian Ziering's character, in the 2013 Syfy television movie Sharknado.

== Filmography ==
Film
Year	Film	Role	Notes
2005	When Tyrants Kiss	Skip Harris	Starring as William Hittinger
2006	Bad Blood	Skip	
2007	All I Want for Christmas	Tyler Brandon	
2009	Boogeyman 3	David	
2009	Bad Blood... the Hunger	Skip	Bad Blood sequel
2009	21 And A Wake-Up	Corporal Lonnie Smith	
2012	American Reunion	AJ	
2012	Bad Blood	Skip	
2014	Bullet	Kyle	
2019	Killer Reputation	Ian Coulter	
2021	Dinner Party	Miles	
Television
Year	Television	Role	Notes
2005	Cold Case	Jimmy Tate - 1988	"Family" (Season 3, Episode 1)
2006	CSI: Miami	Derrick Perry	"Come as You Are" (Season 5, Episode 10)
2007	Without a Trace	Gavin Reilly	"Connections" (Season 5, Episode 18)
2007	Grendel	Finn	Television movie
2008	CSI: Crime Scene Investigation	Troy Birkhart	"Bull" (Season 8, Episode 11)
2008	90210	Steve	"The Jet Set" (Season 1, Episode 2)
2008	Numbers	Kevin Oliver	"Jack of All Trades" (Season 5, Episode 4)
2008	ER	Michael Leary	"Haunted" (Season 15, Episode 5)
2010	Jonas	Van Dyke Tosh	3 episodes
2010	Grey's Anatomy	Mitch	"Shock to the System" (Season 7, Episode 2)
2010	Pair of Kings	Surfer	"A Mermaid's Tail" (Season 1, Episode 3)
2010–11	Pretty Little Liars	Sean Ackard	9 episodes
2012	All The Wrong Notes		2 episodes
2012	Stalked at 17	Chad	Lifetime television Movie
2013	Sharknado	Matt Shepard	Syfy television Movie
2018	The Last Sharknado: It's About Time	Matt Shepard	Syfy television Movie
2018	Bad Tutor	Devin	Lifetime television Movie
2020	A Ring for Christmas	Tyler Davis	Television Movie
