= Mimi Michaels =

American actress (born 1983)

- Born: February 22, 1983 (age 43); Great Neck, New York, U.S.
- Occupation: Actress
- Years active: 1991–present

Mimi Michaels (born February 22, 1983) is an American actress.

== Early life ==
Michaels was born in Great Neck, New York. She attended LaGuardia High School of Performing Arts in New York City. After graduating, on the high school dean's advice, rather than accepting a place at the SUNY Conservatory, she moved to Los Angeles to pursue her acting career. Between acting jobs, she took literature classes at the University of Southern California, where she majored in English.

Michaels remembers herself playing at acting characters in costume at the age of three, and acting professionally in commercials from the age of four. One of her earliest childhood television roles was on Saturday Night Live in 1991. She has a family acting connection: her maternal grandparents had acted in vaudeville and stage drama, and her brother Fred works for a film production company and as a writer.

== Acting career ==
Michaels's first part in Los Angeles was the title role in Sister Aimee: The Aimee Semple McPherson Story, (aka Aimee Semple McPherson, 2006). She played the evangelical preacher from the age of 15 into her 40s, which was a challenge for her developing acting skills. She had leading roles in several web series, the vampire movie 30 Days of Night: Dust to Dust (2008), the parody House of Heather, and the MTV Films horror series Savage County. In 2009, Michaels also had notable supporting roles in the big screen horror film Boogeyman 3, and the NBC television disaster miniseries Meteor: Path to Destruction.

== Filmography ==
=== Film ===
Year	Title	Role	Notes
2006	Aimee Semple McPherson	Aimee Semple McPherson	
2008	I Heart Veronica Martin	Anna Marks	Short film
2008	Boogeyman 3	Lindsey	Video
2009	Compulsion	Leslie	Short film
2009	Gamer	Stikkimuffin	
2009	The Ugly Truth	Female Fan	
2010	Hip-Hop Headstrong	Cindy	Short film
2011	ChromeSkull: Laid to Rest 2	Jess	
2013	OJ: The Musical	Amy	
2014	Relentless Justice	Sherrie De Vries	
2015	Dope	AJ's Receptionist	

=== Television ===
Year	Title	Role	Notes
1991	Saturday Night Live	Cindy	Episode: "Sting"
1995	All My Children	Amanda	1 episode
1996	Law & Order	Vanessa Carey	Episode: "Trophy"
1997	Feds	Lacey Leeds	Episode: "The War Against Crime"
2001	Law & Order	Heather Denslow	Episode: "For Love or Money"
2003	Dragnet	Alana Biehl	Episode: "The Big Ruckus"
2003	The Division	Karen	Episode: "Murder.com"
2003	Without a Trace	Terri Fuller	Episode: "Victory for Humanity"
2005	Six Feet Under	Shannon	Episode: "Hold My Hand"
2006	Shark	Jenny Dennison	Episode: "Pilot"
2006	Criminal Minds	Brooke Chambers	Episode: "North Mammon"
2008	Backwoods	Maggie	TV film
2008	Shark Swarm	Kim Wilder	TV film
2008	30 Days of Night: Dust to Dust	Sara Maguire	TV miniseries
2009	CSI: Crime Scene Investigation	Tiffany Cohe	Episode: "One to Go"
2009	Meteor	Jenny Crowe	TV miniseries
2010	Bones	Soleil	Episode: "The Body and the Bounty"
2010	Savage County	Megan	TV film
2012	Castle	Sarah Marx	Episode: "Dial M for Mayor"
2013	Chosen	Libby	Episode: "The Watchers"
2013	666 Park Avenue	Catherine McKenny	Episode: "Lazarus"
2017	Shades of Blue	Caroline Winston	Recurring Role, 3 episodes
2018	Blue Bloods	Stephanie Dunleevy	Episode: “Friendship, Love, and Loyalty”
2019	Chicago P.D.	Gina Reilly	Episode: "Sacrifice"
2021	FBI: Most Wanted	Whitney Anderson	Episode: "The Line"

=== Video games ===
Year	Title	Role	Notes
2013	BioShock Infinite	Additional Voices	
2016	Quantum Break	Fiona Miller	
