= Backwoods (film) =

2008 television film

- Genre: Horror
- Written by: Anthony Jaswinski
- Directed by: Marty Weiss
- Starring: Ryan Merriman; Haylie Duff; Jonathan Chase; Mimi Michaels
- Country of origin: United States
- Original language: English

Production
- Producer: Albert T. Dickerson III
- Cinematography: James W. Wrenn
- Editor: Thomas A. Krueger
- Running time: 85 minutes
- Production company: Grand Army Entertainment

Original release
- Network: Spike TV
- Release: January 3, 2008

Backwoods is a 2008 American horror television film directed by Marty Weiss and starring Ryan Merriman & Haylie Duff. It premiered on June 8, 2008 on Spike TV.

== Plot ==
The film opens as a couple named Tom and Gwen are in a national park and are attacked and taken hostage. Gwen is raped, and Tom is killed.

Mark Till is a young CEO, a self-made sporting goods tycoon who sees human survival as a skill to be honed and cherished. Each year he sponsors a week-long survival getaway to test the mettle of twelve lucky employees. This year it's a paintball war in the remote woods of the national park in northern California.

On the first day, the Alpha and Bravo camps are set up. In the night, one of Mark's team, Adam Benson, hears a noise in the dark and goes to investigate but sees nothing. The next day the paintball war begins. A few minutes later a member of Mark's team pops a figure ambling through the woods. Score one for Alpha, until they realise that the person they hit isn't part of either team.

While attempting to make it back to camp, the Beta team comes across an abandoned house. Inside they are attacked and kidnapped by men with axes and bows. The men who kidnapped them are part of an overzealous religious group, who have mistaken the team for FBI Agents, and believe they've come to claim their land. The Alpha group return to their camp and find it ransacked and their gas siphoned off. As they try to find some gas, Johnny spots two men across the lake from their campsite. One points and the other shoots Johnny through the neck, killing him instantly. The others try to make a break for it and manage to escape.

Adam then attempts to contact the Park Ranger, but his call is intercepted by one of the cult and he and the others are captured by a man posing as a Park Ranger. Maggie (the only girl in the Beta group) is shown with the leader of the cult (called "Mother"), who tells her the cult's camp is her home now. When Maggie resists, she is taken away and raped by Mother's biological son, a large beast-like man. Gwen, the woman who was captured at the beginning of the film, is now shown to be pregnant and a servant to the cultist group. Lee (the only girl from Group Alpha) is also taken and prepared to be used as a vessel for Mother's son's seed, while the boys are put into cages and brutally abused by the males in the cult.

The fake ranger, who appears to be Mother's husband and the Cult's protector, takes Adam and tortures him, attempting to get information about the FBI's plans. When Adam resists, he sends one of the other cult members to finish him off. As his throat is about to be slit, Adam breaks free of his ropes and attacks and kills his would-be murderer. He then sets the surviving team members (Perry and Basso, who have survived the brutalising) free. They escape, killing several cult members along the way, and rescue the girls. Maggie is hysterical after her ordeal. The group escapes with Lee, who seduced Mother's son into setting her free with touches and kisses, and a good kick in the face.

The survivors are pursued by the cultists. After setting fire to the compound, they are cornered outside it. As they are about to be executed, they turn the tables, taking Mother hostage. Basso is killed and the others escape, severely injuring and killing several cultists, including Mother. Later, Perry falls prey to a tripwire-rigged trap, impaling him through the gut. Although painful, he manages to survive long enough to kill off several more cultists, giving the others the time they need to get away, after which his head is bashed in by Mother's son.

Lee, Maggie and Adam make it up to a mountain where Maggie, who is now delusional from the trauma, commits suicide by jumping off the cliff. Lee and Adam escape by jumping into a river and swimming to the shore, where they meet the real Park Ranger. Then Mother's husband, her son, and another cultist arrive in a truck and shoot the Ranger with an arrow. Adam then takes his gun and shoots two of them. Mother's husband attempts to run Adam down, but collides with the Ranger's truck. Adam shoots him as he begs for help.

Much later, the FBI and the Police arrive, giving medical attention to Adam and Lee. Adam is disturbed to hear that only two bodies were recovered from the final confrontation.

An FBI team treks through the forest, searching for the cult, when Gwen comes out of a cave, having finally escaped herself. As the agent leading the group walks toward her, Gwen shouts for her to run. The head agent is taken by surprise by Mother's son, who has survived his gunshot wounds, and the movie ends.

== Cast ==
- Ryan Merriman as Adam Benson
- Danny Nucci as Perry Winters
- Haylie Duff as Lee
- Craig Zimmerman as Johnny Dash
- Mark Rolston as Ricks
- Troy Winbush as Basso
- Deborah Van Valkenburgh as 'Mother' Ruth
- Mimi Michaels as Maggie
- Jamison Yang as Mike Chen
- Jonathan Slavin as Paul
- Willow Geer as Gwen Holden
- Robert 'Bonecrusher’ Mukes as Josiah
- Blake Lindsley as Agent Tommers
- Jonathan Chase as Tom

== Release ==
The film's television premiere was June 8, 2008 on Spike TV. The DVD was released on June 23, 2009.
