= Credo (2008 film) =

- The poster for Credo
- Directed by: Toni Harman
- Written by: Alex Wakeford
- Produced by: Michael Alexander Dobbin; Alex Wakeford; Toni Harman
- Starring: MyAnna Buring; Clayton Watson; Mark Joseph; Nathalie Pownall; Rhea Bailey; Stephen Gately; Chris Jamba; Victoria Hanlin; Vanessa Zachos
- Cinematography: Alex Wakeford
- Edited by: David Wigram
- Music by: Kim Halliday
- Production company: Alto Films
- Distributed by: Guerilla Films; Grindstone Entertainment Group
- Release date: 18 November 2008
- Running time: 87 minutes
- Country: United Kingdom
- Language: English

Credo, also known as The Devil's Curse, is a 2008 low-budget psychological horror film directed and produced by Toni Harman and written by Alex Wakeford. It stars MyAnna Buring, Clayton Watson, and Nathalie Pownall, Rhea Bailey, and Mark Joseph as five British college students that find themselves trapped in an abandoned seminary with a demon. The film was given an American direct to DVD release under the title The Devil's Curse through Lionsgate Home Entertainment.

== Plot ==
Credo opens with white text on a black background explaining the origin of the real Credo. It cuts to a radio recording of two men discussing the nature of evil while close-ups of insects and occult writings play.

Alice (MyAnna Buring) is alone in a library studying. After the librarian (Chris Courtenay) notes that she is always the last to leave, she packs up her belongings and heads home to find a loud, raucous party already in progress. The party was a touch too rowdy and Alice, along with her four roommates Jock (Clayton Watson), Scott (Mark Joseph), Timmy (Nathalie Pownall), and Jazz (Rhea Bailey), find themselves evicted the next morning.

Jock comes through the next night with a place to stay. As they explore the building, it's revealed in a flashback with narration by Timmy that two students, Seth (Chris Jamba) and Bertha (Candace Grand Pre), who were obsessed with the nature and existence of evil joined forces with four other students in an attempt to summon a demon called Belial. At the last moment, Seth backed out, broke the pentagram binding the demon, and released the demon into the world. All five were found the next day dead by their own hands.

The quintet settles in. Time passes and the power goes out; Alice hears growling and sounds of something being dragged along wood and ventures to one of the rooms they're sleeping in to find the other four are using a shot glass on a Ouija board.

The next morning, the first killing happens: Timmy is found dead in her room hanging from the roof by a length of electrical cord. The rest of the group starts to get picked off one by one whenever they're alone, but the demon never lays a hand on them. It manifests as an illusion that convinces them to take their own life. Jock's mother appears to him, claustrophobic Jazz sees someone in a tunnel with her and brings the ceiling down on herself in a panic, Scott sees his Alice, and Alice, the final girl, sees her father.

After Alice's father finishes his monologue, the film cuts back to Jock, Scott, Jazz, and Timmy on the Ouija board. They ask the board if there is a presence in the room with them; it answers Y. They ask its name; it answers Alice. They ask where it is; it repeats 'tower' over and over until they release the shot glass. Everyone but Scott goes upstairs to the tower while Scott reviews his hidden cameras. Scott sees Alice throughout the house talking to herself and stabbing at the air. Upstairs, Jock finds Alice hanging from the rafters, dead. The film ends with Scott watching a snippet of conversation Alice had earlier with 'Scott'.

Sleep deprivation puts your nerves on edge. Everything rests on this exam, can't afford not to. I'll be fine, thanks for asking.

— Alice

== Production ==
Alex Wakeford (writer/cinematographer) and Toni Harman (director/producer) met while both were still in film school and made a living making short films. The rise of YouTube meant distributors refused to buy short films anymore; instead they made Credo. It was filmed on location in London in a former foreign embassy and a Victorian fire station. The locations were chosen before the story was even written. However, they are forbidden to say exactly where shooting took place because the locations are slated to be developed into luxury apartments and the investors were worried the stories of the location being haunted could drive off buyers, but the writer did hint that they were a stone's throw from the Tyburn Tree.

The original poster for Credo

The cast and crew were convinced the buildings were haunted. Throughout filming, cast and crew both reported hearing strange sounds and voices. On one occasion, production stopped so a search could be mounted for an unknown figure watching the crew - but none were ever found. The director used the casts' fear to her advantage, sending the cast down into the basement to get them scared for real before shooting scenes where they were supposed to pretend to be scared. In an effort to find evidence the locations were haunted, they got a hold of a bat box. A bat box is a device used to catch bats, but Paranormal investigators have repurposed them to supposedly pick up sounds of ghosts. The results of the bat box experiments varied; in the fire station itself, Alex picked up a moaning sound on the top floor. On another location they investigated but didn't film at, Toni felt the bat box definitely picked up the sounds of an entity responding to their questions. while Alex didn't think they picked up anything supernatural, although he felt a 'presence' in the room with him.

The film's original title was Credo and some marketing work was done under that name; a trailer and a poster were both produced. As a part of the North American release, Lionsgate released it under the new title The Devil's Curse along with a new trailer and poster. Neither Alex nor Toni were informed of the new title or trailer before it was done, but both approve of it.

== Reception ==
Reviews are mixed, but moderately positive. Positive reviewers focused on how it was different from most modern horror films, noting the "eerie atmosphere and spine-chilling sound design", lack of gore, lack of overt sexuality, lack of torture, good acting, sharp script, and intriguing ending. Negative reviewers felt the movie was generic, boring, and bloodless, although even the negative reviews felt the camera work and acting of MyAnna Buring were pretty decent.
