= New York Asian Film Festival =

Asian film festival in New York

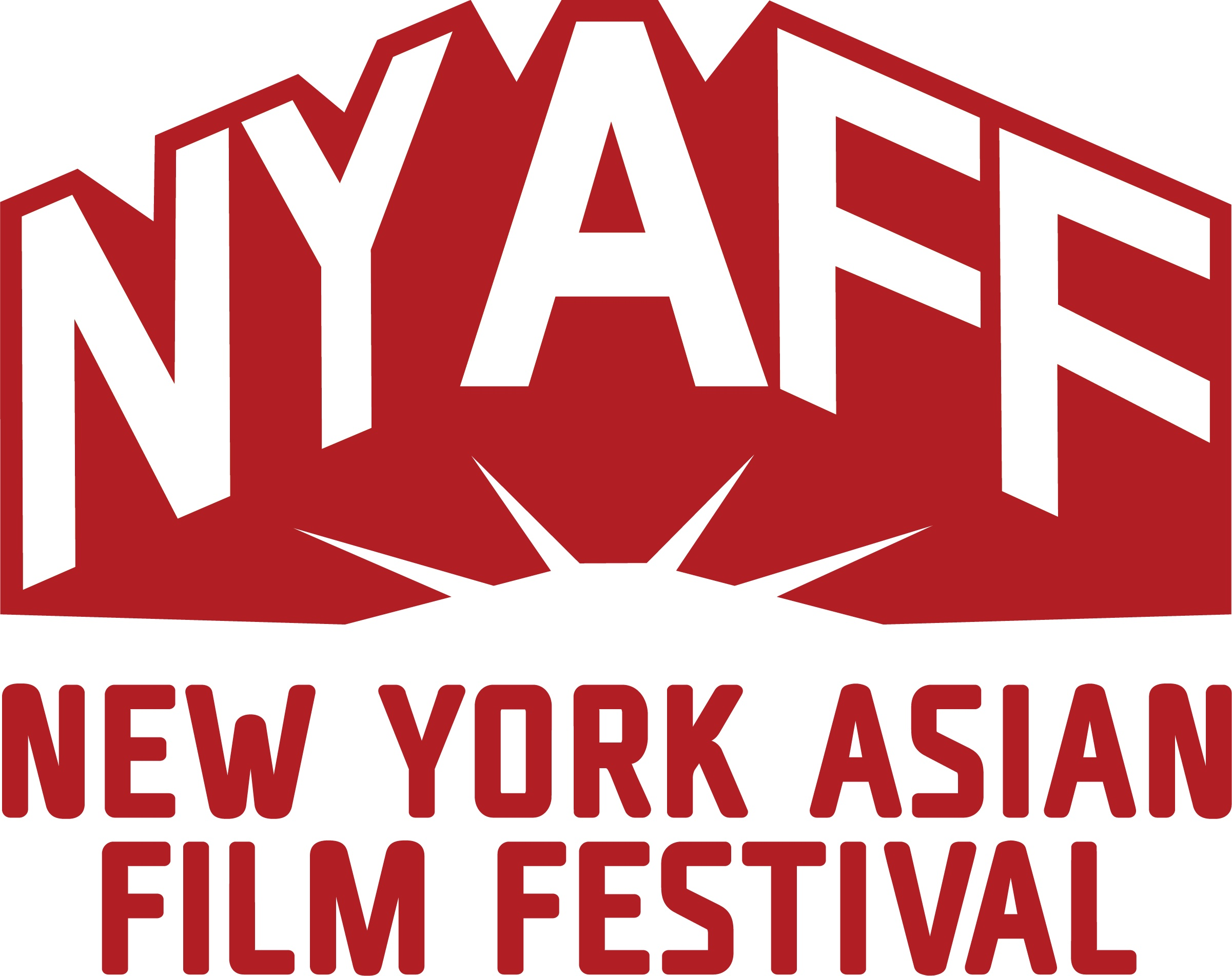
- Location: Film at Lincoln Center, New York City, U.S.
- Founded: 2002
- Awards: Uncaged Award
- Hosted by: New York Asian Film Foundation Inc.
- No. of films: 100 films
- Festival date: Opening: 10 July 2026; Closing: 26 July 2026
- Language: International
- Website: nyaff.org

Current: 25th New York Asian Film Festival
- 26th 24th

The New York Asian Film Festival (NYAFF) is a film festival held in New York City dedicated to the display of Asian film and culture. The New York Asian Film Festival generally features contemporary premieres and classic titles from Eastern Asia and Southeast Asia (particularly Japan, South Korea, Taiwan, Hong Kong, China, Philippines, and Thailand), though South Asian cinema has also been represented via films from India and Pakistan.

== Background ==
The NYAFF displays many of its films as a first-and-only screening in the country, giving audiences the chance to see films that would not otherwise be distributed in the United States. Actors and directors of the exhibited films are often brought over as special guests of the NYAFF. Genres featured in the film festival include Horror, Gangster/Crime, Martial Arts, and Action.

The New York Asian Film Festival is owned and operated by the nonprofit organization the New York Asian Film Foundation Inc. Every year the annual film festival is organized and curated by president and executive director Samuel Jamier, programmers Claire Marty, David Wilentz, Karen Severns, and Koichi Mori. The festival's selection is curation-based but also accepts a number of submissions.

Starting in 2008, in addition to the Audience Award, the festival also handed out a Jury Prize. In 2013 the Daniel A. Craft Award for Excellence in Action Cinema was added in memory of the festival's late director and treasurer. The festival is also a large engine for filmmakers and their films to be picked up by large name distribution companies in the United States and in Asia.

== Venues ==
Film at Lincoln Center is the festival's main institutional partner and home venue since 2010.

Until 2007, the festival was held annually at the Anthology Film Archives and The ImaginAsian. In 2007, the festival moved to the IFC Center and Japan Society, and in 2010, Film at Lincoln Center became the festival's primary home, with SVA Theatre as a second venue. In 2022, the Barrymore Film Center in Fort Lee, New Jersey became an additional venue.

== New York Asian Film Festival screenings ==
=== 2026 Edition ===
Screenings was held from July 10–26, 2026 at Film at Lincoln Center.

Year	Title	Original Title	Country	Director	Premiere Status
Opening film
2026	Colony	군체	South Korea	Yeon Sang-ho	North American Premiere

=== 2025 Edition ===
Screenings was held from July 11–27, 2025 at Film at Lincoln Center.

Year	Title	Original Title	Country	Director	Premiere Status
Opening film
2024	Informant	정보원	South Korea	Kim Suk	World Premiere

=== 2024 Edition ===
Screenings were held from July 12–28, 2024 at Film at Lincoln Center.

Year	Title	Original Title	Country	Director	Premiere Status
Opening film
2024	Victory	빅토리	South Korea	Park Beom-su	World Premiere
Centerpiece Presentation
2024	The Killers	더 킬러스	South Korea	Kim Jong-kwan, Roh Deok, Chang Hang-jun, Lee Myung-Se	World Premiere
Closing film
2024	Twilight of the Warriors: Walled In	九龍城寨·圍城	Hong Kong	Soi Cheang	North American Premiere

=== 2023 Edition ===
Screenings were held from July 14–30, 2023 at Film at Lincoln Center.

Year	Title	Original Title	Country	Director	Premiere Status
Opening film
2023	Killing Romance	킬링 로맨스	South Korea	Lee Won-suk	North American Premiere
Centerpiece Presentation
2023	Dream	드림	South Korea	Lee Byeong-heon	International Premiere
Closing film
2023	The Monkey King		United States	Anthony Stacchi	World Premiere

=== 2022 Edition ===
Screenings were held from July 15–31, 2022 at Film at Lincoln Center and Asia Society.

Year	Title	Original title	Country	Director	Premiere Status
Opening film
2022	Fast & Feel Love	เร็วโหด..เหมือนโกรธเธอ	Thailand	Nawapol Thamrongrattanarit	International Premiere
Asian American Focus
2022	Dealing with Dad		USA	Tom Huang	East Coast Premiere
Centerpiece Presentation
2022	Hansan: Rising Dragon	한산: 용의 출현	South Korea	Kim Han-min	U.S. Premiere
Closing film
2022	Alienoid	외계+인 1부	South Korea	Choi Dong-hoon	North American Premiere

=== 2021 Showcase ===
Screenings were held from August 6–22, 2021 at SVA Theater.

Year	Title	Original title	Country	Director	Premiere Status
Asian American Focus
2021	Americanish		USA	Iman K. Zawahry	New York Premiere
2021	A Shot Through the Wall		USA	Aimee Long	New York Premiere
2021	Snakehead		USA	Evan Jackson Leong	Special Premiere
Beyond Borders
2021	The Asian Angel	アジアの天使	Japan, South Korea	Yuya Ishii	North American Premiere
2021	Barbarian Invasion	野蛮人入侵	Malaysia	Tan Chui Mui	North American Premiere
2021	Fighter	파이터	South Korea	Jero Yun	North American Premiere
2020	A Song for You	他与罗耶戴尔	Chinese	Dukar Tserang	North American Premiere
Centerpiece Presentation
2021	Raging Fire	怒火	Hong Kong, China	Benny Chan	International Premiere
China on the Move
2020	Anima	莫爾道嘎	China	Cao Jinling	North American Premiere
2020	The Old Town Girls	兔子暴力	China	Shen Yu	North American Premiere
2020	Tough Out	棒！少年	China	Xu Hui-jing	North American Premiere
Closing film
2021	Sinkhole	싱크홀	South Korea	Kim Ji-hoon	North American Premiere
Crowd Pleasers
2021	All U Need Is Love	總是有愛在隔離	Hong Kong	Vincent Kok	North American Premiere
2020	Breakout Brothers	逃獄兄弟	Hong Kong	Mak Ho Pong	North American Premiere
2020	The Con-Heartist	อ้าย..คนหล่อลวง	Thailand	Mez Tharatorn	North American Premiere
2020	From Today, It's My Turn!!	今日から俺は!!劇場版	Japan	Yuichi Fukuda	US Premiere
2020	Hold Me Back	私をくいとめて	Japan	Akiko Ohku	US Premiere
2021	jigoku-no-hanazono: Office Royale	地獄の花園	Japan	Kazuaki Seki	North American Premiere
2020	My Missing Valentine	消失的情人節	Taiwan	Chen Yu-hsun	New York Premiere
2020	One Second Champion	一秒拳王	Hong Kong	Chiu Sin-hang	North American Premiere
2020	Tonkatsu DJ Agetaro	とんかつDJアゲ太郎	Japan	Ken Ninomiya	North American Premiere
2020	Zero To Hero	媽媽的神奇小子	Hong Kong	Jimmy Wan	North American Premiere

=== 2020 2nd Winter Showcase ===
Screenings were held from Feb 14–16, 2020 at SVA Theater.

Year	Title	Original title	Country	Director	Premiere Status
1994	Eat Drink Man Woman	飲食男女	Taiwan + US	Ang Lee	
2019	Extreme Job	극한직업	South Korea	Lee Byeong-heon	
2019	The First Supper	最初の晩餐	Japan	Shiro Tokiwa	North America
1996	God of Cookery	食神	Hong Kong	Stephen Chow	
2013	The Lunchbox	The Lunchbox	India	Ritesh Batra	
1985	Tampopo	タンポポ	Japan	Juzo Itami	
2013	Zone Pro Site: The Moveable Feast	總舖師	Taiwan	Chen Yu-hsun	

=== 2019 ===
Screenings were held from June 28 – July 14, 2019 at the Film Society of Lincoln Center, and SVA Theater.

Year	Title	Original title	Country	Director	Premiere Status
2018	212 Warrior	Wiro Sableng 212	Indonesia	Angga Dwimas Sasongko	North America
2019	5 Million Dollar Life	五億円のじんせい	Japan	Moon Sung-ho	North American
2018	A First Farewell	第一次的离别	China	Lina Wong	US
2019	A Resistance	항거	South Korea	Joe Min-ho	North America
2019	Another Child	미성년	South Korea	Kim Yoon-seok	North America
2019	The Attorney	一級指控	Hong Kong	Wong Kwok-fai	International
2018	Complicity	コンプリシティ 優しい共犯	Japan	Kei Chikaura	New York
2018	The Crossing	过春天	Hong Kong	Bai Xue	
2018	Dare to Stop Us	止められるか、俺たちを	Japan	Kazuya Shiraishi	New York
2018	Dark Figure of Crime	암수살인	South Korea	Kim Tae-kyun	New York
2019	The Fable	ザ・ファブル	Japan	Kan Eguchi	US
2019	The Fatal Raid	辣警霸王花2 不義之戰	Hong Kong	Jacky Lee	North America
2019	Fly Me to the Saitama	翔んで埼玉	Japan	Hideki Takeuchi	New York
2019	Furie	Hai Phượng	Vietnam	Le-Van Kiet	
2018	G Affairs	G殺	Hong Kong	Lee Cheuk Pan	North America
2018	The Gun	銃	Japan	Masaharu Take	North American
2019	Han Dan	寒單	Taiwan	Huang Chao-liang	North America
2018	Hard-Core	ハード・コア	Japan	Nobuhiro Yamashita	North American
2019	If You Are Happy	学区房83弄	China	Xiaoming Chen	New York
1993	Iron Monkey	少年黃飛鴻之鐵馬騮	Hong Kong	Yuen Woo-ping	
2019	It's a Mad, Mad, Mad, Mad Show	瘋狂電視台	Taiwan	Nien-Chu Hsieh	North America
2018	Jam	jam	Japan	Sabu	North American
2018	Jinpa	撞死了一只羊	China	Pema Tseden	US
2018	Kokdu: A Story of Guardian Angels	꼭두 이야기	South Korea	Kim Tae-yong	US
2018	Lying to Mom	鈴木家の嘘	Japan	Katsumi Nojiri	North American
2018	Ma	Ma	Philippines	Kenneth Lim Dagatan	International
2018	Maggie	메기	South Korea	Yi Ok-seop	North America
2018	Master Z: Ip Man Legacy	葉問外傳：張天志	Hong Kong	Yuen Woo-ping	
1982	The Miracle Fighters	奇門遁甲	Hong Kong	Yuen Woo-ping	
2019	Missbehavior	恭喜八婆	Hong Kong	Pang Ho-cheung	
2018	Money	돈	South Korea	Park Noo-ri	New York
2018	Move the Grave	이장	South Korea	Jeong Seung-o	International
2017	Mr. Long	MR. LONG/ミスター・ロン	Japan	Sabu	
2019	The Odd Family: Zombie On Sale	기묘한 가족	South Korea	Lee Min-jae	North America
2018	The Pool	นรก 6 เมตร	Thailand	Ping Lumpraploeng	North America
2019	Push and Shove	狗眼看人心	China	Wu Nan	North America
2018	The Rib	肋骨	China	Wei Zhang	North America
2019	Samurai Marathon	サムライマラソン	Japan + United Kingdom	Bernard Rose	North American
2018	Savage	雪暴	China	Cui Siwei	
2018	The Scoundrels	狂徒	Taiwan	Tzu-Hsuan Hung	New York
2016	See You Tomorrow	擺渡人	Hong Kong	Zhang Jiajia	North America
2018	Signal Rock		Philippines	Chito S. Roño	New York
2018	Someone in the Clouds	真愛神出來	Taiwan	Mitch Lin and Gary Tseng	
2018	Song Lang	Song Lang	Vietnam	Leon Le	New York
2018	Still Human	淪落人	Hong Kong	Oliver Siu Kuen Chan	New York
2018	Sub-Zero Wind	영하의 바람	South Korea	Kim Yu-ri	North America
2019	The Terror: Infamy	The Terror: Infamy	US	Josef Kubota Wladyka	World
2018	Uncle and House	合群路	China	Luo Hanxing	International
2019	Walk With Me	雙魂	Malaysia	Ryon Lee	North America
2019	White Snake	白蛇：缘起	China	Amp Wong, Ji Zhao	North America
2019	The White Storm 2 Drug Lords	掃毒2天地對決	Hong Kong	Herman Yau	International
2019	Winter After Winter	冬去冬又来	China	Xing Jian	North America
2018	Wushu Orphan	武林孤儿	China	Huang Huang	North America
2018	Zombiepura	尸杀军营	Singapore	Jacen Tan	North America

=== 2019 1st Winter Showcase ===
Screenings were held from February 1–3 & 8–10, 2019 at SVA Theater.

Year	Title	Original title	Country	Director	Premiere Status
2014	100 Yen Love	百円の恋	Japan	Masaharu Take	
2006	After This Our Exile	父子	Taiwan + Hong Kong + Malaysia	Patrick Tam	
2019	Breathless	똥파리	South Korea	Yang Ik-June	
2005	Crying Fist	주먹이 운다	South Korea	Ryoo Seung-wan	New York
2018	Fly by Night	非常盜	Malaysia	Zahir Omar	New York
2017	Have a Nice Day	好极了	China	Liu Jian	
1992	King of Beggars	武狀元蘇乞兒	Hong Kong	Gordon Chan	
1995	Mee Pok Man	Mee Pok Man	Singapore	Eric Khoo	
2009	Merantau	Merantau	Indonesia	Gareth Evans	
2018	Miss Baek	미쓰백	South Korea	Lee Ji-Won	North America
1979	The Mystery of Chess Boxing	雙馬連環	Taiwan	Joseph Kuo	
2011	The Raid: Redemption	Serbuan maut	Indonesia	Gareth Evans	
1977	7 Grandmasters	虎豹龍蛇鷹	Taiwan	Joseph Kuo	
1968	The Swordsman of All Swordsmen	一代劍王	Taiwan	Joseph Kuo	

=== 2018 ===
Screenings were held from June 29 – July 15, 2018 at the Film Society of Lincoln Center, and SVA Theater.

Year	Title	Original title	Country	Director	Premiere Status
2017	1987: When the Day Comes	1987	South Korea	Jang Joon-hwan	
2017	After My Death	죄 많은 소녀	South Korea	Kim Ui-seok	North American
2017	The Age of Blood	역모 – 반란의 시대	South Korea	Kim Hong-sun	
2008	Beast Stalker	証人	Hong Kong	Dante Lam	
2017	The Big Call	猜猜我是誰	Hong Kong	Oxide Pang	North American
2018	Blood of Wolves	孤狼の血	Japan	Kazuya Shiraishi	North American
2017	The Bold, the Corrupt, and the Beautiful	血觀音	Taiwan	Yang Ya-che	
2017	The Brink	狅戰	Hong Kong	Jonathan Li	New York
2018	Buffalo Boys		Indonesia Singapore	Mike Wiluan	U.S.
2018	BuyBust		Philippines	Erik Matti	World
2017	Counters	카운터스	South Korea	Lee Il-ha	North American
2018	Crossroads: One Two Jaga	One Two Jaga	Malaysia	Namron	North American
2018	Dude's Manual	脱单告急	China	Kevin Ko	
2018	Dukun		Malaysia	Dain Said	International
2018	Dynamite Graffiti	素敵なダイナマイトスキャンダル	Japan	Masanori Tominaga	North American
2017	The Empty Hands	空手道	Hong Kong	Chapman To	
2018	End of Summer	西小河的夏天	China	Zhou Quan	New York
2017	The Ex-File 3: The Return of the Exes	前任3: 再见前任	China	Tian Yu-sheng	
2018	Gatao 2: Rise of the King	角頭GATAO 2: 王者再起	Taiwan	Yen Cheng-kuo	North American
2017	Hit the Night	밤치기	South Korea	Jeong Ga-young	North American
2018	House of the Rising Sons	兄弟班	Hong Kong	Anothony Chan	World
2017	The Hungry Lion	飢えたライオン	Japan	Takaomi Ogata	North American
2017	I Can Speak	아이 캔 스피크	South Korea	Kim Hyun-seok	
2018	Inuyashiki	いぬやしき	Japan	Shinsuke Sato	North American
2015	Kakekomi	駆込み女と駆出し男	Japan	Masato Harada	New York
1995	Kamikaze Taxi		Japan	Masato Harada	
2017	The Last Verse	最後的詩句	Taiwan	Tseng Ying-ting	New York
2018	Little Forest	리틀 포레스트	South Korea	Yim Soon-rye	New York
2018	Liverleaf	ミスミソウ	Japan	Eisuke Naito	North American
2018	Looking for Lucky	尋狗啟事	China	Jiang Jia-chen	North American
2017	The Looming Storm	暴雪将至	China	Dong Yue	North American
2018	Men on the Dragon	逆流大叔	Hong Kong	Sunny Chan	World
2017	Microhabitat	소공녀	South Korea	Jeon Go-woon	North American
2017	Midnight Bus	ミッドナイト・バス	Japan	Masao Takeshita	North American
2017	Missing Johnny	強尼．凱克	Taiwan	Huang Xi	New York
2017	Neomanila		Philippines	Mikhail Red	New York
2017	Old Beast	老兽	China	Zhou Ziyang	New York
2018	On Happiness Road	幸福路上	Taiwan	Sung Hsin-yin	North American
2013	On the Job		Philippines	Erik Matti	
2017	One Cut of the Dead	カメラを止めるな！	Japan	Shinichirou Ueda	North American
2018	Operation Red Sea	紅海行動	Hong Kong	Dante Lam	
2017	Paradox	殺破狼・貪狼	Hong Kong	Wilson Yip	
2017	Premika	เปรมิกาป่าราบ	Thailand	Siwakorn Jarupongpa	North American
2017	Respeto		Philippines	Treb Monteras	North American
2018	The Return		South Korea Denmark	Malene Choi	New York
2018	River's Edge	リバーズ・エッジ	Japan	Isao Yukisada	North American
2018	Sad Beauty	เพื่อนฉัน...ฝันสลาย	Thailand	Bongkod Bencharongkul	North American
2017	Sekigahara	関ヶ原	Japan	Masato Harada	New York
2018	The Scythian Lamb	羊の木	Japan	Daihachi Yoshida	New York
2018	Sid & Aya: Not a Love Story		Philippines	Irene Villamor	New York
2017	Smokin' on the Moon	ニワトリ☆スター	Japan	Kanata Wolf	International
2000	Tears of the Black Tiger	ฟ้าทะลายโจร	Thailand	Wisit Sasanatieng	
2017	The Third Murder	三度目の殺人	Japan	Hirokazu Kore-eda	New York
2013	Unbeatable	激戰	Hong Kong China	Dante Lam	
2018	We Will Not Die Tonight		Philippines	Richard Somes	World
2018	What a Man Wants	바람 바람 바람	South Korea	Lee Byeong-heon	International
2017	Wrath of Silence	暴裂无声	China	Xin Yukun	New York

=== 2017 ===
On March 13 it was announced that the 16th annual New York Asian Film Festival would happen from June 30 – July 16 emanating from the Film Society of Lincoln Center and the SVA Theatre.

The NYAFF Jury Award returned in 2017 with two new categories. The 2017 NYAFF Jury Award for Best Feature was given to BAD GENIUS. The award was presented to Nattawut Poonpiriya who was in attendance. Special Mention was given to A DOUBLE LIFE while Honorable Mention for Most Promising Director, AKA The Brass Balls Award, was awarded to Lê Bình Giang for Vietnam's Kfc. Jury members included indie actress Jennifer Kim, video-on-demand acquisitions executive George Schmaltz, and NYAFF super fan Kristina Winters.

Year	Title	Original title	Country	Director	Premiere Status
2016	Aroused by Gymnopedies	ジムノペディに乱れる	Japan	Isao Yukisada	North American
2017	Bamseom Pirates Seoul Inferno	밤섬해적단 서울불바다	South Korea	Jung Yoon-suk	North American
2017	Bad Genius	ฉลาดเกมส์โกง	Thailand	Nattawut Poonpiriya	International
2017	Battle of Memories	记忆大师	China	Leste Chen	
2016	Blood of Youth	少年	China	Yang Shupeng	North American
2016	Birdshot		Philippines	Mikhail Red	North American
2016	Close-Knit	彼らが本気で編むときは	Japan	Naoko Ogigami	U.S.
2016	Dawn of the Felines	牝猫たち	Japan	Kazuya Shiraishi	North American
2017	Dealer/Healer	毒。誡	Hong Kong	Lawrence Lau	North American
2016	Destruction Babies	ディストラクション・ベイビーズ	Japan	Tetsuya Mariko	New York
2016	A Double Life	二重生活	Japan	Yoshiyuki Kishi	North American
2017	Duckweed	乘风破浪	China	Han Han	
2006	Eternal Summer	盛夏光年	Taiwan	Leste Chen	New York
2005	Election	黑社會	Hong Kong	Johnnie To	
2017	Extraordinary Mission	非凡任务	China	Alan Mak; Anthony Pun	
2017	Fabricated City	조작된 도시	South Korea	Park Kwang-hyun	
2016	Fantasy of the Girls	소녀의 세계	South Korea	Ahn Jeong-min	International
2016	The Gangster's Daughter	林北小舞	Taiwan	Mei-Juin Chen	North American
2016	Godspeed	一路順風	Taiwan	Chung Mong-hong	New York
2016	Happiness	ハピネス	Japan	Sabu	New York
2016	Jane	꿈의 제인	South Korea	Cho Hyun-hoon	North American
2016	Japanese Girls Never Die	アズミ・ハルコは行方不明	Japan	Daigo Matsui	New York
2017	Journey to the West: The Demons Strike Back	西遊伏妖篇	Hong Kong China	Tsui Hark	
2017	Kfc		Vietnam	Lê Bình Giang	North American
2016	The Long Excuse	永い言い訳	Japan	Miwa Nishikawa	New York
2017	Love and Other Cults	獣道	Japan	Eiji Uchida	North American
2016	Mad World	一念無明	Hong Kong	Wong Chun	New York
2016	The Mole Song: Hong Kong Capriccio	土竜の唄 香港狂騒曲	Japan	Takashi Miike	North American
2017	Mon Mon Mon Monsters	報告老師！怪怪怪怪物！	Taiwan	Giddens Ko	North American
2016	Mrs. B, A North Korean Woman	마담 B	South Korea	Jero Yun	North American
2016	Mrs. K		Malaysia Hong Kong	Ho Yuhang	
1992	Naked Killer	赤裸羔羊	Hong Kong	Wong Jing	
2017	Ordinary Person	보통사람	South Korea	Kim Bong-han	North American
2016	A Quiet Dream	춘몽	South Korea	Zhang Lu	U.S.
2016	Rage	怒り	Japan	Lee Sang-il	New York
2016	The Road To Mandalay	再見瓦城	Taiwan	Midi Z	New York
2016	Saving Sally		Philippines	Avid Liongoren	New York
2017	A Single Rider	싱글라이더	South Korea	Lee Joo-young	North American
2016	Someone to Talk To	一句頂一萬句	China	Liu Yulin	
2016	Soul Mate	七月与安生	China Hong Kong	Derek Tsang	
2016	Soul on a String	皮绳上的魂	China	Zhang Yang	New York
2016	Split	스플릿	South Korea	Choi Kook-hee	
2016	Suffering of Ninko	仁光の受難	Japan	Norihiro Niwatsukino	New York
2017	Survival Family	サバイバルファミリー	Japan	Shinobu Yaguchi	New York
2014	The Taking of Tiger Mountain	智取威虎山	China	Tsui Hark	
2017	This Is Not What I Expected	喜欢你	China Hong Kong	Derek Hui	
2017	The Tooth and the Nail	석조저택 살인사건	South Korea	Kim Hwi; Jung Sik	North American
2016	The Truth Beneath	비밀은 없다	South Korea	Lee Kyoung-mi	New York
2015	Town In A Lake	MATANGTUBIG	Philippines	Jet Leyco	North American
2016	Traces of Sin	愚行録	Japan	Kei Ishikawa	U.S.
2017	Vampire Cleanup Department	救僵清道夫	Hong Kong	Yan Pak-wing; Chiu Sin-hang	New York
2016	Vanishing Time: A Boy Who Returned	가려진 시간	South Korea	Um Taw-hwa	
2017	The Village of No Return	健忘村	Taiwan	Chen Yu-hsun	North American
2017	The Villainess	악녀	South Korea	Jung Byung-gil	U.S.
2016	Wet Woman in the Wind	風に濡れた女	Japan	Akihiko Shiota	North American
2017	With Prisoners	同囚	Hong Kong	Andrew Wong Kwok-kuen	North American
2017	Zombiology: Enjoy Yourself Tonight	今晚打喪屍	Hong Kong	Alan Lo	North American

=== 2016 ===
Screenings were held from June 22 – July 9, 2016 at the Film Society of Lincoln Center, and SVA Theater.

Year	Title	Original title	Country	Director	Premiere Status
2015	Ten Years	十年	Hong Kong	Ng Ka-leung, Jevons Au, Chow Kwun-Wai, Fei-Pang Wong, Kwok Zune	North American
2001	All About Lily Chou-Chou	リリイ・シュシュのすべて	Japan	Shunji Iwai	
2015	Alone	혼자	South Korea	Park Hong-Min	New York
2015	Apocalypse Child		Philippines	Mario Cornejo	North American
2015	The Bacchus Lady	죽여주는 여자	South Korea	E J-yong	New York
2016	The Bodyguard aka My Beloved Bodyguard	特工爺爺	Hong Kong China	Sammo Hung	New York
2016	Super Bodyguard	超级保镖	China	Yue Song	North American
2015	The Boys Who Cried Wolf	양치기들	South Korea	Kim Jin-Hwang	North American
2016	A Bride for Rip Van Winkle	リップヴァンウィンクルの花嫁	Japan	Shunji Iwai	New York
2015	Creepy	クリーピー 偽りの隣人	Japan	Kiyoshi Kurosawa	New York
2015	Dongju: The Portrait of a Poet	동주	South Korea	Lee Joon-ik	New York
2015	Fourth Place	4등	South Korea	Jung Ji-woo	New York
2016	Grace	อวสานโลกสวย	Thailand	Pun Homchuen; Onusa Donsawai	North American
2015	Hamog (Haze)		Philippines	Ralston Jover	North American
2015	Heart Attack aka Freelance	ฟรีแลนซ์..ห้ามป่วย ห้ามพัก ห้ามรักหมอ	Thailand	Nawapol Thamrongrattanarit	New York
2016	Hentai Kamen 2: The Abnormal Crisis	HK 変態仮面 アブノーマル・クライシス	Japan	Yuichi Fukuda	North American
1998	A Hero Never Dies	真心英雄	Hong Kong	Johnnie To	
2015	Honor Thy Father		Philippines	Erik Matti	New York
2016	If Cats Disappeared from the World	世界から猫が消えたなら	Japan	Akira Nagata	North American
2015	Inside Men	내부자들	South Korea	Woo Min-ho	New York
2015	Jagat (Brutal)	ஐகாட்	Malaysia	Shanjhey Kumar Perumal	International
2015	Keeper of Darkness	陀地驅魔人	Hong Kong	Nick Cheung	North American
2016	Killer And Undercover		Hong Kong	Lau Kar-leung	
2015	Kiyamachi Drama	木屋町DARUMA	Japan	Hideo Sakaki	International
2015	The Laundryman	青田街一號	Taiwan	Lee Chung	New York
2015	Lazy Hazy Crazy	同班同學	Hong Kong	Luk Yee-sum	North American
2012	Love in the Buff	春嬌與志明	Hong Kong	Pang Ho-cheung	
2015	Maverick	菜鳥	Taiwan	Cheng Wen-tang	North American
2016	The Mermaid	美人鱼/美人魚	China Hong Kong	Stephen Chow	
2015	Miss Hokusai	百日紅	Japan	Keiichi Hara	New York
2016	The Mobfathers	選老頂	Hong Kong	Herman Yau	New York
2015	Mr. Six	老炮儿	China	Guan Hu	
2015	The Priests	검은 사제들	South Korea	Jang Jae-hyun	
2015	Saving Mr. Wu	解救吾先生	China	Ding Sheng	
2015	Seoul Station	서울역	South Korea	Yeon Sang-ho	North American
2015	She Remembers, He Forgets	差一點我們會飛	Hong Kong	Adam Wong	
2015	The Sound of a Flower	도리화가	South Korea	Lee Jong-pil	North American
1996	Swallowtail Butterfly	スワロウテイル	Japan	Shunji Iwai	
2015	The Tag-Along	紅衣小女孩	Taiwan	Cheng Wei-hao	US
2006	Tekkonkinkreet	鉄コン筋クリート	Japan	Michael Arias	
2016	The Tenants Downstairs	樓下的房客	Taiwan	Adam Tsuei	International
1989	Tetsuo: The Iron Man	鉄男	Japan	Shinya Tsukamoto	
2015	The Throne	사도	South Korea	Lee Joon-ik	
2016	Too Young to Die!	Too Young to Die! 若くして死ぬ	Japan	Kankurō Kudō	North American
2016	Trivisa	樹大招風	Hong Kong	Frank Hui; Jevons Au; Vicky Wong	
2016	Twisted Justice	日本で一番悪い奴ら	Japan	Kazuya Shiraishi	International
2015	A Violent Prosecutor	검사외전	South Korea	Lee Il-hyung	
2015	Weeds on Fire	點五步	Hong Kong	Chan Chi-fat	International
2016	What a Wonderful Family!	家族はつらいよ	Japan	Yoji Yamada	US
2015	What's In The Darkness	黑处有什么	China	Wang Yichun	North American
2015	Yellow Flowers on the Green Grass	Tôi thấy hoa vàng trên cỏ xanh	Vietnam	Victor Vu	New York
2015	Zinnia Flower	百日告別	Taiwan	Tom Lin Shu-yu	New York

=== 2015 ===
Screenings were held from June 26 – July 11, 2015 at the Film Society of Lincoln Center, and SVA Theater.

Year	Title	Original title	Country	Director	Premiere Status
1965	Abashiri Prison	網走番外地	Japan	Teruo Ishii	
2015	Banglasia	猛加拉殺手	Malaysia	Namewee	International
1973	Battles without Honor and Humanity	仁義なき戦い	Japan	Kinji Fukasaku	
2014	Brotherhood of Blades	绣春刀	China	Lu Yang	
2014	Café. Waiting. Love.	等一個人咖啡	Taiwan	Chiang Chin-lin	North American
2014	Cart	카트	South Korea	Boo Ji-young	New York
2015	Chasuke's Journey	天の茶助	Japan	Sabu	North American
1987	City on Fire	龍虎風雲	Hong Kong	Ringo Lam	
2015	Coin Locker Girl	차이나타운	South Korea	Han Jun-hee	North American
2012	Cold War	寒戰	Hong Kong	Longman Leung; Sunny Luk	
1975	Cops Vs. Thugs	県警対組織暴力	Japan	Kinji Fukasaku	
2015	Empire of Lust	순수의 시대	South Korea	Ahn Sang-hoon	International
2014	A Fool	一个勺子	China	Chen Jianbin	North American
1997	Full Alert	高度戒備	Hong Kong	Ringo Lam	
2015	Full Strike	全力扣殺	Hong Kong China	Derek Kwok; Henri Wong	US
2007	Funuke, Show Some Love You Losers!	腑抜けども、悲しみの愛を見せろ	Japan	Daihachi Yoshida	
2015	Initiation Love	イニシエーション・ラブ	Japan	Yukihiko Tsutsumi	International
2014	Insanity	暴瘋語	Hong Kong	David Lee	North American
2000	The Isle	섬	South Korea	Kim Ki-duk	
2014	It's Already Tomorrow in Hong Kong		Hong KongUnited States	Emily Ting	New York
2014	Kabukicho Love Hotel	さよなら歌舞伎町	Japan	Ryūichi Hiroki	New York
2015	La La La at Rock Bottom	味園ユニバース	Japan	Nobuhiro Yamashita	North American
2014	The Last Reel	ដុំហ្វីលចុងក្រោយ	Cambodia	Kulikar Sotho	New York
2015	Little Big Master	五個小孩的校長	Hong Kong China	Adrian Kwan	
1979	The Man who Stole the Sun	太陽を盗んだ男	Japan	Kazuhiko Hasegawa	
2014	Meeting Dr. Sun	行動代號:孫中山	Taiwan	Yee Chih-Yen	US
2014	My Love, Don't Cross That River	님아, 그 강을 건너지 마오	South Korea	Jin Mo-young	New York
2015	Nowhere Girl	東京無国籍少女	Japan	Mamoru Oshii	North American
1964	Nihon Kyokaku-Den (Tales of Chivalry in Japan)	日本侠客伝	Japan	Masahiro Makino	
2014	Pale Moon	紙の月	Japan	Daihachi Yoshida	North American
2014	Partners in Crime	共犯	Hong Kong Taiwan	Chang Jung-Chi	New York
2010	Permanent Nobara	パーマネントのばら	Japan	Daihachi Yoshida	New York
2015	Port of Call	踏血尋梅	China	Philip Yung	North American
2005	The President's Last Bang	그때 그사람들	South Korea	Im Sang-soo	
2014	Red Amnesia	闯入者	China	Wang Xiaoshuai	New York
2014	Revivre	화장	South Korea	Im Kwon-taek	New York
2014	River Road	家在水草丰茂的地方	China	Li Ruijun	US
2015	Robbery	老笠	Hong Kong	Fire Lee	World
2014	The Royal Tailor	상의원	South Korea	Lee Won-suk	New York
2014	Ruined Heart: Another Love Story Between A Criminal and A Whore		PhilippinesGermany	Khavn (AKA Khavn De La Cruz)	New York
2014	Second Chance	逆轉勝	Taiwan	Wen Yen Kung	East Coast
2014	Socialphobia	소셜포비아	South Korea	Hong Seok-jae	US
2015	Solomon's Perjury Part 1: Suspicion	ソロモンの偽証 前篇・事件	Japan	Izuru Narushima	North American
2015	Solomon's Perjury Part 2: Judgement	ソロモンの偽証 後篇・裁判	Japan	Izuru Narushima	North American
2014	The Taking of Tiger Mountain	智取威虎山	China	Tsui Hark	
2014	Taksu	欲動	Japan	Kiki Sugino	North American
2014	Tokyo Tribe	トウキョウ トライブ	Japan	Sion Sono	New York
2015	Twenty	스물	South Korea	Lee Byeong-heon	International
2015	Two Thumbs Up	衝鋒車	Hong Kong	Lau Ho-leung	North American
2014	Vengeance of an Assassin	เร็วทะลุเร็ว.	Thailand	Panna Rittikrai	North American
2014	Violater		Philippines	Eduardo "Dodo" Dayao	North American
2001	Waikiki Brothers	와이키키 브라더스	South Korea	Yim Soon-rye	
2014	The Whistleblower	제보자	South Korea	Yim Soon-rye	North American
1964	Wolves, Pigs, and Men	狼と豚と人間	Japan	Kinji Fukasaku	

=== 2014 ===
Screenings were held from June 27 – July 14, 2014 at the Film Society of Lincoln Center, Asia Society and Japan Society.

Year	Title	Original title	Country	Director	Premiere Status
2014	3D Naked Ambition	3D豪情	Hong Kong	Lee Kung-lok	North American
2014	Aberdeen	香港仔	Hong Kong	Pang Ho-cheung	
2013	Aim High In Creation!		Australia	Anna Broinowski	US
2014	All-Round Appraiser Q: The Eyes of Mona Lisa	万能鑑定士 Q モナ リザの瞳	Japan	Shinsuke Sato	North American
2012	Apolitical Romance	對面的女孩殺過來	Taiwan	Hsieh Chun-yi	New York
2014	As the Light Goes Out	救火英雄	China Hong Kong	Derek Kwok	North American
2013	Au revoir l' ete	ほとりの朔子	Japan	Koji Fukada	US
2013	Beautiful New Bay Area Project	ビューティフル・ニュー・ベイエリア・プロジェクト	Japan	Kiyoshi Kurosawa	
2014	Blind Massage	推拿	China France	Lou Ye	US
1970	The Chinese Boxer	龍虎鬥	Hong Kong	Jimmy Wang Yu	
2013	Cold Eyes	감시자들	South Korea	Cho Ui-seok; Kim Byung-seo	New York
2013	Control	控制	China Hong Kong Taiwan	Kenneth Bi	North American
1973	The Delinquent	憤怒青年	Hong Kong	Chang Cheh; Kuei Chih-Hung	
2013	The Devil's Path	凶悪	Japan	Shiraishi Kazuya	East Coast
2013	The Eternal Zero	永遠の0	Japan	Takashi Yamazaki	US
2013	The Face Reader	관상	South Korea	Han Jae-rim	
2013	Firestorm 3D	風暴	China Hong Kong Malaysia	Alan Yuen	New York
2014	From Vegas to Macau	賭城風雲	China Hong Kong	Wong Jing	New York
2014	Fuku-Chan of Fukufuku Flats	福福荘の福ちゃん	Japan	Yosuke Fujita	North American
2002	Golden Chicken	金雞	Hong Kong	Samson Chiu	
2014	Golden Chickensss	金雞 3	Hong Kong	Matt Chow	North American
2013	The Great Passage	舟を編む	Japan	Yuya Ishii	New York
2013	Han Gong-ju	한공주	South Korea	Lee Su-jin	New York
2013	Hope	소원	South Korea	Lee Joon-ik	North American
2000	Il Mare	시월애	South Korea	Lee Hyun-seung	
2014	Kano		Taiwan	Umin Boya	North American
1980	Killer Constable aka Karate Exterminators	萬人斬	Hong Kong	Kuei Chih-Hung	
1976	Killers on Wheels aka Madboys In Hong Kong	無法無天飛車黨	Hong Kong	Kuei Chih-Hung	
1974	The Legend of the 7 Golden Vampires	七金屍	Hong Kong	Roy Ward Baker	
1976	The Magic Blade	天涯明月刀	Hong Kong	Chor Yuen	
2013	Manshin: Ten Thousand Spirits	만신	South Korea	Park Chan-kyong	North American
2013	Maruyama, The Middle Schooler	中学生円山	Japan	Kankurō Kudō	New York
2013	May We Chat	微交少女	Hong Kong	Philip Yung	North American
2013	Miss Zombie		Japan	Sabu	New York
2013	Moebius	뫼비우스	South Korea	Kim Ki-duk	New York
2014	The Mole Song: Undercover Agent Reiji	土竜の唄 潜入捜査官 REIJI	Japan	Takashi Miike	US
2014	Monsterz	MONSTERZ モンスターズ	Japan	Hideo Nakata	North American
1985	Mr. Vampire	殭屍先生	Hong Kong	Ricky Lau	
2014	My Man	私の男	Japan	Kazuyoshi Kumakiri	North American
2013	New World	신세계	South Korea	Park Hoon-jung	
2013	No Man's Land	無人區	China	Ning Hao	North American
1967	One-Armed Swordsman	獨臂刀	Hong Kong	Chang Cheh	
2014	Overheard 3		Hong Kong	Alan Mak; Felix Chong	International
2014	The Pinkie		Japan	Lisa Takeba	
1998	Portland Street Blues		Hong Kong	Raymond Yip	
2002	Public Enemy	공공의 적	South Korea	Kang Woo-suk	
2013	R100		Japan	Hitoshi Matsumoto	
2013	Rigor Mortis	殭屍	Hong Kong	Juno Mak	
2013	Rough Play	배우는 배우다	South Korea	Shin Yeon-shick	North American
1983	Seeding of a Ghost	種鬼	Hong Kong	Chuan Yang	
2013	Seventh Code	セブンスコード	Japan	Kiyoshi Kurosawa	North American
2013	Silent Witness	全民目擊	China	Fei Xing	North American
2014	The Snow White Murder Case	白ゆき姫殺人事件	Japan	Yoshihiro Nakamura	US
2013	Soul	失魂	Taiwan	Chung Mong-hong	New York
2013	The Terror Live	더 테러 라이브	South Korea	Kim Byung-woo	
2013	Top Star	톱스타	South Korea	Park Joong-hoon	North American
2014	Uzumasa Limelight	太秦ライムライト	Japan	Ken Ochiai	International
2013	The White Storm	掃毒	China	Benny Chan	North American
2012	Why Don't You Play in Hell?	地獄でなぜ悪い	Japan	Sion Sono	
2013	The White Storm	掃毒	China	Benny Chan	North American
2014	Wood Job!	WOOD JOB！ （ウッジョブ）神去なあなあ日常	Japan	Shinobu Yaguchi	North American
2013	Zone Pro Site: The Moveable Feast	舖師總：移動大廚	Taiwan	Chen Yu-hsun	New York

=== 2013 ===
Screenings were held from June 28 – July 15, 2013 at the Film Society of Lincoln Center, Asia Society, and Japan Society.

Year	Title	Original title	Country	Director	Premiere Status
2012	Aberya		Philippines	Christian Linaban	International
2012	The Animals		Philippines	Gino M. Santos	International
2004	Arahan	아라한 장풍 대작전	South Korea	Ryoo Seung-wan	
2012	Bad Film		Japan	Sion Sono	North American
2013	Behind The Camera: Why Mr. E Went To Hollywood	뒷담화 감독이 미쳤어요	South Korea	E J-yong	US
2012	Beijing Blues	神探亨特張	China	Gao Qunshu	New York
2013	The Berlin File	베를린	South Korea	Ryoo Seung-wan	
2006	Bloody Tie	사생결단	South Korea	Choi Ho	
2012	The Bullet Vanishes	消失的子彈	China Hong Kong	Law Chi-leung	
2012	Catnip		Philippines	Kevin Dayrit	International
1982	The Challenge of the Lady Ninja aka Chinese Super Ninja 2	女忍者	Taiwan	Lee Tso-Nam	
2012	Cold War	寒戰	Hong Kong	Longman Leung, Sunny Luk	New York
2013	The Complex	クロユリ団地	Japan	Hideo Nakata	North American
2012	Comrade Kim Goes Flying		North Korea	Nicholas Bonner, Anja Daelemans, Gwang-hun Kim	New York
2012	The Concubine	후궁: 제왕의 첩	South Korea	Kim Dae-seung	North American
2012	Confession of Murder	내가 살인범이다	South Korea	Jung Byung-gil	North American
2012	Countdown	เคาท์ดาวน์	Thailand	Nattawat Poonpiriya	North American
2012	Day Trip	청출어람	South Korea	Park Chan-wook; Park Chan-kyong	
2012	Double Xposure	二次曝光	China	Li Yu	North American
2012	Dreams For Sale	夢売るふたり	Japan	Miwa Nishikawa	New York
2013	Drug War	毒战	China Hong Kong	Johnnie To	New York
1973	Enter the Dragon	龍爭虎鬥	United States Hong Kong	Robert Clouse	
2012	Eungyo aka A Muse	은교	South Korea	Jung Ji-woo	New York
2012	Feng Shui	萬箭穿心	China	Wang Jing	North American
2013	Forever Love	阿嬤的夢中情人	Taiwan	Aozaru Shiao, Kitamura Toyoharu	North American
2012	The Fridge		Philippines	Rico Maria Ilarde	North American
2012	Gangster	อันธพาล	Thailand	Kongkiat Khomsiri	North American
2013	The Great War: Director's Cut	大戰放映會	Hong Kong	Yan Yan Mak	World
2013	Hardcore Comedy	重口味	Hong Kong	Henri Wong; Chong Siu-Wing; Lai Yiu-fai	World
2012	Helter Skelter	ヘルタースケルター	Japan	Mika Ninagawa	New York
2012	Hentai Kamen	HK 変態仮面	Japan	Yuichi Fukuda	North American
2013	How to Use Guys with Secret Tips	남자사용설명서	South Korea	Lee Won-suk	North American
2012	I'm Flash		Japan	Toshiaki Toyoda	US
2012	An Inaccurate Memoir	匹夫	China	Leon Yang	North American
2012	Ip Man: The Final Fight	葉問 終極一戰	Hong Kong	Herman Yau	North American
2012	It's Me, It's Me	俺俺	Japan	Satoshi Miki	North American
2013	Jury	주리	South Korea	Kim Dong-Ho	North American
2012	Juvenile Offender	범죄소년	South Korea	Kang Yi-kwan	North American
2012	The Kirishima Thing	桐島、部活やめるってよ	Japan	Daihachi Yoshida	New York
1981	The Lady Avenger		Taiwan	Yang Chia-yun	
2012	The Last Supper	王的盛宴	China Hong Kong Taiwan	Lu Chuan	US
2012	The Last Tycoon	大上海	China Hong Kong	Wong Jing	North American
2010	The Legend Is Born: Ip Man		Hong Kong	Herman Yau	
2012	Lesson of the Evil	悪の教典	Japan	Takashi Miike	New York
1983	A Life of Ninja	亡命忍者	Taiwan	Lee Tso-nam	
2012	Mystery	浮城謎事	China France	Lou Ye	North American
1979	Never Too Late To Repent aka The First Error Step	錯誤的第一步	Taiwan	Tsai Yang-ming	
1981	On The Society File of Shanghai	上海社會檔案	Taiwan	Wang Chu-chin	
2013	One Perfect Day	사랑의 가위바위보	South Korea	Kim Jee-woon	International
2012	The Peach Tree	복숭아나무	South Korea	Ku Hye-sun	North American
2012	Rigodon		Philippines	Erik Matti	International
2013	The Rooftop	天台	Taiwan	Jay Chou	International
2012	Rurouni Kenshin	るろうに剣心(	Japan	Keishi Otomo	New York
2013	Secretly, Greatly	은밀하게 위대하게 (	South Korea	Jang Cheol-soo	International
2013	A Story of Yonosuke	横道世之介	Japan	Shuichi Okita	North American
2005	Taiwan Black Movies	台灣黑電影	Taiwan	Hou Chi-jan	
2013	Tales From The Dark Part 1	迷離夜	Hong Kong	Simon Yam; Fruit Chan; Lee Chi-ngai	World
2012	Thermae Romae	テルマエ・ロマエ	Japan	Hideki Takeuchi	New York
2010	The Unjust	부당거래	South Korea	Ryoo Seung-wan	
2013	Very Ordinary Couple	연애의 온도	South Korea	Roh Deok	North American
2012	Vesuvius		Philippines	Erik Matti	
2011	The Warped Forest	あさっての森	Japan	Shunichiro Miki	U.S. Continental
2012	When A Wolf Falls In Love With A Sheep	南方小羊牧場	Taiwan	Hou Chi-jan	New York
1982	Woman Revenger aka The Nude Body Case In Tokyo	女性的復仇	Taiwan	Tsai Yang-ming	
1996	Young and Dangerous	古惑仔之人在江湖	Hong Kong	Andrew Lau	
1996	Young and Dangerous 2	古惑仔之猛龍過江	Hong Kong	Andrew Lau	

"Korean Short Film Madness" was showcased with short films from the 11th Mise-en-scène Short Film Festival as part of the New York Asian Film Festival. The following films were available for view on DramaFever:

Year	Title	Original title	Country	Director
2012	Who Killed Gong Jung-Wha?	누가 공정화를 죽였나?	South Korea	Han Ji-Hye
2012	Cheong	청이	South Korea	Kim Jung-In
2011	Pandora	판도라	South Korea	Heo Myeong-Haeng
2012	Green Slime	녹색물질	South Korea	Kwon Oh-Kwang
2011	Anesthesia	마취	South Korea	Kim Souk-Young
2013	The Professional Demonstrators	꾼	South Korea	Hwang Hyun-jin
2012	The Visitor	가정방문	South Korea	Kim Bo-young
2012	Poison Frog	독개구리	South Korea	Koh Jung-wook
2012	You Promised Me	어떤 약속	South Korea	Pil Gam-sung

=== 2012 ===
Screenings were held from July 29–15, 2012 at the Film Society of Lincoln Center and Japan Society.

Year	Title	Original title	Country	Director	Premiere Status
2012	A Simple Life	桃姐	Hong Kong	Ann Hui	
2012	Ace Attorney	逆転裁判	Japan	Takashi Miike	New York
2012	All About My Wife	내 아내의 모든 것	South Korea	Min Kyu-Dong	New York
2012	Asura	アシュラ	Japan	Keiichi Sato	North American
2012	The Big Gun	大拳銃	Japan	Hajime Ohata	North American
2011	Bloody Fight in Iron-Rock Valley	철암계곡의 혈투	South Korea	Ji Ha Jean	North American
1983	The Boxer's Omen	魔	Hong Kong	Kuei Chih-hung	
2011	Couples	커플즈	South Korea	Jeong Yong-Ki	New York
2005	Crying Fist	주먹이 운다	South Korea	Ryu Seung-wan	
2011	Dead Bite	ก้านคอกัด	Thailand	Joey Boy	North American
2012	Din Tao: Leader of the Parade	阵头	Taiwan	Kai Feng	North American
2012	Doomsday Book	인류멸망보고서	South Korea	Kim Jee-woon, Yim Pil-sung	North American
2011	Dragon	武侠	Hong Kong China	Peter Chan	New York
2011	East Meets West 2011	東成西就2011	Hong Kong	Jeff Lau Chun-Wai	North American
2011	Failan	파이란	South Korea	Song Hae-Sung	
1972	Five Fingers of Death a.k.a. King Boxer	天下第一拳	Hong Kong	Jeong Chang-hwa	
1968	Goke, Body Snatcher from Hell	吸血鬼ゴケミドロ	Japan	Hajime Sato	
2011	Golden Slumbers		France Cambodia	Davy Chou	New York
2012	Guns and Roses	黄金大劫案	China	Ning Hao	North American
2012	Gyo, Fish Attack	ギョ	Japan	Takayuki Hirao	New York
2011	Hard Romanticker	ハードロマンチッカー	Japan	Gu Su-yeon	New York
2012	Henge	へんげ	Japan	Hajime Ohata	North American
2011	Honey Pupu	消失打看	Taiwan	Hung-i Chen	New York
2002	Infernal Affairs	無間道	Hong Kong	Andrew Lau	
2003	Infernal Affairs 2	無間道 II	Hong Kong	Andrew Lau	
2005	Kill Zone (SPL: Sha Po Lang)	殺破狼	Hong Kong	Wilson Yip	
1972	King Boxer (The Five Fingers of Death)	天下第一拳	Hong Kong	Jeong Chang-hwa	
2011	The King of Pigs	돼지의 왕	South Korea	Yeon Sang-Ho	New York
2012	Let's Make the Teacher Have a Miscarriage Club	先生を流産させる会	Japan	Eisuke Naito	North American
2011	The Lost Bladesman	关云长	China, Hong Kong	Felix Chong, Alan Mak	New York
2012	Love in the Buff	春嬌與志明	Hong Kong	Pang Ho-Cheung	
2011	Love Strikes!	モテキ	Japan	Hitoshi Ohne	North American
2011	Make Up	命运化妆师	Taiwan	Yi-chi Lien	North American
1988	Miami Connection		South Korea	Richard Park, Y.K.Kim	
2012	Monsters Club	モンスターズクラブ	Japan	Toshiaki Toyoda	US
2012	Nameless Gangster	범죄와의 전쟁 : 나쁜놈들 전성시대	South Korea	Yoon Jong-Bin	
2011	Nasi Lemak 2.0	辣死你妈	Malaysia	Namewee	North American
2003	Old Boy	올드보이	South Korea	Park Chan-wook	
2012	Pang Ho-Cheung's First Attempt		Hong Kong	Pang Ho-cheung	North American
2012	Potechi	ポテチ	Japan	Yoshihiro Nakamura	North American
2011	Red Vacance Black Wedding	붉은 바캉스 검은 웨딩	South Korea	Park Chul-Soo, Kim Tae-Sik	North American
2010	Sacrifice	赵氏孤儿	China	Chen Kaige	New York
2011	Scabbard Samurai	さや侍	Japan	Hitoshi Matsumoto	North American
2010	Secret Love	비밀애	South Korea	Ryu Hoon	North American
2011	Smuggler	スマグラー おまえの未来を運べ	Japan	Katsuhito Ishii	New York
2011	Starry Starry Night	星空	Taiwan	Tom Lin	New York
1971	The Swift Knight	來如風	Hong Kong	Jeong Chang-Hwa	
2011	The Sword Identity	倭寇的踪迹	China	Haofeng Xu	New York
2011	Tokyo Playboy Club	東京プレイボーイクラブ	Japan	Yosuke Okuda	New York
2011	Tormented	ラビット・ホラー3D	Japan	Takashi Shimizu	New York
2012	Vulgaria	低俗喜剧	Hong Kong	Pang Ho-cheung	North American
2011	War of the Arrows	최종병기 활	South Korea	Kim Han-Min	New York
2011	Warriors of the Rainbow: Seediq Bale 1 & 2	赛德克·巴莱	Taiwan	Te-Sheng Wei	
2011	You Are the Apple of My Eye	那些年，我们一起追的女孩	Taiwan	Giddens Ko	New York
2011	Zero Man vs. The Half Virgin	半分処女とゼロ男	Japan	Sakichi Sato	North American

"Korean Short Film Madness" was showcased with short films from the 10th Mise-en-scène Short Film Festival as part of the New York Asian Film Festival. The following films were screened:

Year	Title	Original title	Country	Director
2011	Night Fishing	파란만장	South Korea	Park Chan-wook, Park Chan-kyong
2011	The Hideout	소굴	South Korea	Lee Chang-hee
2010	Heart		South Korea	Erick Oh
2011	The Lucky Gumboy	행운동 껌소년	South Korea	Choi Shin-choon
2011	Finis Operis	불멸의 사나이	South Korea	Moon Byoung-gon

=== 2011 ===
Screenings were held from July 1–14, 2011 at the Film Society of Lincoln Center and Japan Society.

Year	Title	Original title	Country	Director	Premiere Status
2010	13 Assassins	十三人の刺客	Japan	Takashi Miike	New York
2011	Abraxas	アブラクサスの祭	Japan	Naoki Kato	New York
2010	BKO: Bangkok Knockout	โคตรสู้ โคตรโส	Thailand	Panna Rittikrai	New York
2002	B.T.S. (Better Than Sex)	愛情靈藥	Taiwan	Chao-Bin Su	
2000	Battle Royale	バトル・ロワイアル	Japan	Kinji Fukasaku	
2011	Battlefield Heroes	평양성	South Korea	Lee Joon-ik	New York
2010	Bedevilled	김복남 살인사건의 전말	South Korea	Jang Cheol-soo	New York
1995	The Blade	刀	Hong Kong	Tsui Hark	
2010	A Boy and His Samurai	ちょんまげぷりん	Japan	Yoshihiro Nakamura	North American
2010	Buddha Mountain	观音山	China	Li Yu	North American
2000	The Cabbie	运转手之恋	Taiwan	Yiwen Chen, Huakun Zhang	
2008	The Chaser	추격자	South Korea	Na Hong-jin	
2006	The City of Violence	짝패	South Korea	Ryoo Seung-wan	
2010	Dark On Dark		Japan	Makoto Ohtake	International
2010	Detective Dee and the Mystery of the Phantom Flame	狄仁傑 之 通天帝國	ChinaHong Kong	Tsui Hark	
1992	Dragon Inn	新龍門客棧	Hong Kong	Raymond Lee	
1983	Duel to the Death	生死決	Hong Kong	Ching Siu-tung	
2010	Foxy Festival	페스티발	South Korea	Lee Hae-young	North American
2011	Gantz		Japan	Shinsuke Sato	
2011	Gantz: Perfect Answer		Japan	Shinsuke Sato	
2010	Haunters	초능력자	South Korea	Kim Min-Seok	New York
2010	Heaven's Story	ヘヴンズ ストーリー	Japan	Takahisa Zeze	North American
2010	Horny House of Horror	ファッション·ヘル（ス）	Japan	Jun Tsugita	North American
2011	Karate-Robo Zaborgar	電人ザボーガー	Japan	Noboru Iguchi	New York
2011	The Last Days of the World	世界最後の日々	Japan	Eiji Uchida	World
2010	Love & Loathing & Lulu & Ayano	名前のない女たち	Japan	Hisayasu Satō	North American
2010	Machete Maidens Unleashed!		Philippines Australia	Mark Hartley	
2010	The Man from Nowhere	아저씨	South Korea	Lee Jeong-beom	
2011	Milocrorze – A Love Story	ミロクローゼ	Japan	Yoshimasa Ishibashi	North American
2011	Ninja Kids!!!	忍たま乱太郎	Japan	Takashi Miike	World
2010	Ocean Heaven	海洋天堂	ChinaHong Kong	Xue Xiaolu	New York
2011	Osamu Tezuka's Buddha: The Great Departure	手塚治虫のブッダ 赤い砂漠よ！美しく	Japan	Kozo Morishita	North American
2011	Punished	報應	Hong Kong	Law Wing-cheung	North American
1982	Raw Force		PhilippinesUnited States	Edward D. Murphy	
2010	The Recipe	된장	South Korea	Lee Seo-Goon	New York
2010	Reign of Assassins	剑雨	ChinaHong Kong Taiwan	Chao-Bin Su; John Woo	New York
1991	Riki-Oh: The Story of Ricky	力王	Hong Kong	Lam Ngai Kai	
2011	Ringing in Their Ears	劇場版 神聖かまってちゃん ロックンロールは鳴り止まないっ	Japan	Yu Irie	International
2008	Sell Out!	货已售完	Malaysia	Yeo Joon Han	
2011	Shaolin	新少林寺	ChinaHong Kong	Benny Chan	North American
2010	Troubleshooter	해결사	South Korea	Kwon Hyeok-Jae	New York
2010	The Unjust	부당거래	South Korea	Ryoo Seung-wan	New York
2000	Versus	ヴァーサス	Japan	Ryuhei Kitamura	
2011	Yakuza Weapon	極道兵器	Japan	Tak Sakaguchi; Yūdai Yamaguchi	New York
2010	The Yellow Sea	황해	South Korea	Na Hong-jin	New York
1983	Zu: Warriors from the Magic Mountain	新蜀山劍俠	Hong Kong	Tsui Hark	

The 11th New York Asian Film Festival presented the following films from the 9th Mise-en-scène Short Film Festival:

Year	Title	Original title	Country	Director	Premiere Status
2009	Master Piece	마스터피스	South Korea	Choi Wan-Jae	International
2010	The Most Beautiful	가장 아름다운	South Korea	Hwang Sang-Jun	International
2010	The Key	열쇠	South Korea	Kim Hyun-Chul	International
2009	Entering The Mind Through The Mouth	고양이 입속으로 뛰어들다	South Korea	Choi Jin sung	International
2010	The Brass Quintet	더 브라스 퀸텟	South Korea	Yoo Dae-Eol	International
2010	Tunnel	터널	South Korea	Kim Saino	International
2009	Debris	데브리스	South Korea	No. 474 (Choi Bong-jun, Lee Han-bit, Kim Yong-min)	International
2009	Familyship	호로자식을 위하여	South Korea	Yoon Hye-Ryeom	International
2009	My mom's Great Kimchi Stew	엄마의 커다란 김치찌개	South Korea	Han Seung-Hun	International
2009	C-Kal	씨칼	South Korea	Kim Tae-Yoon	International
2010	Mr. Tap's Holiday	간만에 나온 종각이	South Korea	Lee Sang-Geun	International

=== 2010 ===
Screenings were held from June 25 – July 8, 2010 at the Film Society of Lincoln Center, the IFC Center and Japan Society.

Year	Title	Original title	Country	Director	Premiere Status
2009	8000 Miles	SR サイタマノラッパー	Japan	Yu Irie	North American
2010	8000 Miles 2: Girl Rapper	SRサイタマノラッパー2 女子ラッパー☆傷だらけのライム	Japan	Yu Irie	North American
2009	Actresses	여배우들	South Korea	E J-Yong	New York
2010	Alien vs. Ninja	AVN/エイリアンVSニンジャ	Japan	Seiji Chiba	World
2009	Annyong Yumika	あんにょん由美香	Japan	Tetsuaki Matsue	North American
2010	Blades of Blood	구르믈 버서난 달처럼	South Korea	Lee Joon-Ik	International
2009	The Blood of Rebirth	蘇りの血	Japan	Toshiaki Toyoda	New York
2009	Bodyguards and Assassins	十月围城	ChinaHong Kong	Teddy Chan	New York
2010	Boys on the Run	ボーイズ・オン・ザ・ラン	Japan	Daisuke Miura	North American
2009	Castaway on the Moon	김씨표류기	South Korea	Lee Hae-Jun	New York
2009	Chaw	차우	South Korea	Shin Jeong-Won	North American
2010	Confessions	告白	Japan	Tetsuya Nakashima	International
2009	Cow	斗牛	China	Hu Guan	U.S.
2009	Crazy Racer	疯狂的赛车	China	Ning Hao	New York
2010	Death Kappa		Japan	Tomoo Haraguchi	World
2009	Dear Doctor	ディア・ドクター	Japan	Miwa Nishikawa	New York
2010	Development Hell		Hong Kong	Hiroshi Fukazawa	New York
2010	Doman Seman	堀川中立売	Japan	Go Shibata	World
1987	Eastern Condors		Hong Kong	Sammo Hung	
2010	Echoes of the Rainbow	歲月神偷	Hong Kong	Alex Law	North American
2010	Gallants	打擂台	Hong Kong	Chi-kin Kwok, Clement Sze-Kit Cheng	North American
2009	Golden Slumber	ゴールデンスランバー	Japan	Yoshihiro Nakamura	New York
2007	Groper Train: School Uniform Hunter		Japan	Yōjirō Takita	
2008	Ip Man	葉問	Hong Kong	Wilson Yip	
2010	Ip Man 2	葉問2:宗師傳奇	Hong Kong	Wilson Yip	North American
2004	Japanese Wife Next Door Part 2		Japan	Yutaka Ikejima	
2009	Kung Fu Chefs	功夫厨神	Hong Kong	Wing-Kin Yip	North American
1986	L.A. Streetfighters		South Korea	Woo-sang Park	
2010	Little Big Soldier	大兵小将	China Hong Kong	Sheng Ding	New York
2009	A Little Pond	작은 연못	South Korea	Lee Sang-Woo	International
2010	Live Tape		Japan		North American
2008	Merantau Warrior		Indonesia	Gareth Evans	New York
2010	Mutant Girls Squad	戦闘少女 血の鉄仮面伝説	Japan	Noboru Iguchi, Yoshihiro Nishimura, Tak Sakaguchi	International
2009	Power Kids	5 หัวใจฮีโร่	Thailand	Krissanapong Rachata	
2009	Raging Phoenix	จีจ้า ดื้อสวยดุ	Thailand	Rashane Limtrakul	New York
2008	Red Cliff	赤壁	China Hong Kong	John Woo	
2010	Sawako Decides	川の底からこんにちは	Japan	Yuya Ishii	New York
2008	Scandal Makers	과속스캔들	South Korea	Kang Hyung-Chul	New York
2009	Sophie's Revenge	菲常完美 / 소피의 연애매뉴얼	China South Korea	Yimeng Jin (Eva Jin)	New York
2009	Symbol	しんぼる	Japan	Hitoshi Matsumoto	New York
2010	Secret Reunion	의형제	South Korea	Jang Hun	
2009	The Storm Warriors – The Storm Riders 2	风云II	Hong Kong	Oxide Pang Chun, Danny Pang	U.S.
2009	Tian An Men	天安门	China	Daying Ye	International
2009	Yatterman	ヤッターマン	Japan	Takashi Miike	

The 10th New York Asian Film Festival presented the following films from the 8th Mise-en-scène Short Film Festival:

Year	Title	Original title	Country	Director
2009	Interview With A Courteous Murderer	예의바른 살인범과의 인터뷰	South Korea	Jeon Byeong-Deock
2009	Let Me Know Your Phone Number	전화번호가 필요해!!	South Korea	Kim Jong-Hoon
2009	Prelude to an Emotional Fight	정서적 싸움3-감성적 싸움 전초전	South Korea	Shin Jae-Young, Kim Dong-hu
2009	Shall We Take A Walk?	산책가	South Korea	Kim Young-Geun, Kim Yae-young
2009	His Name Is Trevor	그의 이름은 트레버	South Korea	Kim Seuk-Hwan
2009	Mom's Holiday	엄마의 휴가	South Korea	Kim Kwang-Bok
2009	Metal Movie	메탈 무비	South Korea	Park Kyung-Kun
2009	Dust Kid	먼지 아이	South Korea	Jung Yu-Mi
2009	Mate		South Korea	Jason Lee
2009	Drink & Confess		South Korea	Yoon Sung-Hyun
2009	Me Four Inch Precious	나의 사랑스러운 4인치 그녀	South Korea	Sim Sou-Yun
2009	Don't Step Out Of The House	남매의 집	South Korea	Jo Sung-Hee

=== 2009 ===
Screenings were held from June 19 – July 5, 2009 at the IFC Center and Japan Society.

Year	Title	Original title	Country	Director	Premiere Status
2008	20th Century Boys 1: Beginning of the End	20世紀少年	Japan	Yukihiko Tsutsumi	New York
2009	20th Century Boys 2: The Last Hope	20世紀少年 第二章 / 20世紀少年＜第2章＞ 最後の希望	Japan	Yukihiko Tsutsumi	New York
2008	All Around Us		Japan	Ryōsuke Hashiguchi	New York
2008	Antique	서양골동양과자점 엔티크	South Korea	Min Kyu-dong	New York
2008	Be a Man! Samurai School	魁!!男塾	Japan	Tak Sakaguchi	New York
2009	Be Sure to Share	ちゃんと伝える	Japan	Sion Sono	World
2005	Blind Love	ブラインド・ラブ わいせつステージ	Japan	Daisuke Goto	
2008	Breathless	똥파리	South Korea	Yang Ik-June	North American
2008	Cape No. 7	海角七號	Taiwan	Wei Te-sheng	New York
2008	Children of the Dark	闇の子供たち	Japan	Junji Sakamoto	
2008	Climber's High	クライマーズ・ハイ	Japan	Masato Harada	North American
2009	The Clone Returns Home	クローンは故郷をめざす	Japan	Kanji Nakajima	New York
2008	Crush and Blush	미쓰 홍당무	South Korea	Lee Kyoung-mi	New York
2008	Dachimawa Lee	다찌마와 리 – 악인이여 지옥행 급행열차를 타라!	South Korea	Ryoo Seung-wan	North American
2008	Dream	비몽	South Korea	Kim Ki-duk	North American
2008	An Empress and the Warriors	江山美人	Hong Kong	Ching Siu-tung	North American
2008	The Equation of Love and Death	李米的猜想	China	Cao Baoping	New York
2007	Exodus	出埃及記	China	Pang Ho-cheung	New York
2007	Eye in the Sky	跟蹤 (電影)	Hong Kong	Yau Nai-hoi	New York
2009	Fish Story	フィッシュストーリー	Japan	Yoshihiro Nakamura	North American
1978	Five Deadly Venoms	五毒	Hong Kong	Chang Cheh	
2009	The Forbidden Door	Pintu Terlarang	Indonesia	Joko Anwar	North American
2009	Gehara: The Long Haired Giant Monster	長髪大怪獣 ゲハラ	Japan	Kiyotaka Taguchi	International
2008	Go Go 70s	고고70	South Korea	Choi Ho	North American
1984	Groper Train: Search for the Black Pearl	痴漢電車 下着検札	Japan	Yōjirō Takita	
1984	Groper Train: Wedding Capriccio	痴漢電車 ちんちん発車	Japan	Yōjirō Takita	
2009	High Noon		Hong Kong	Heiward Mak	New York
2008	Hard Revenge Milly	ハード・リベンジ、ミリー	Japan	Takanori Tsujimoto	North American
2009	Hard Revenge Milly: Bloody Battle	ハード・リベンジ、ミリー～ブラッディバトル	Japan	Takanori Tsujimoto	North American
1977	House	ハウス	Japan	Nobuhiko Obayashi	
2008	If You Are the One	非诚勿扰	China	Feng Xiaogang	North American
2008	Ip Man	葉問	Hong Kong	Wilson Yip	North American
2004	The Japanese Wife Next Door Part 1		Japan	Yutaka Ikejima	
2008	K-20: The Fiend With Twenty Faces	K-20 怪人二十面相・伝	Japan	Shimako Satō	New York
2009	Lala Pipo: A Lot of People	ララピポ	Japan	Masayuki Miyano	North American
1998	The Longest Nite	暗花	Hong Kong	Patrick Yau; Johnnie To	
2009	Love Exposure	愛のむきだし	Japan	Sion Sono	New York
2008	Magazine Gap Road	馬己仙峽道	Hong Kong	Nicholas Chin	New York
2008	The Magic Hour	ザ・マジックアワー	Japan	Kōki Mitani	New York
2008	The Monster X Strikes Back:Attack the G8 Summit	ギララの逆襲 洞爺湖サミット危機一発	Japan	Minoru Kawasaki	North American
2009	Old Fish		China	Gao Qunshu	North American
2009	Plastic City	荡寇	Hong Kong	Yu Lik-wai	US Premiere of Uncut version
2009	Pride	プライド	Japan	Shusuke Kaneko	North American
2009	Quick Gun Murugun		India	Shashanka Ghosh	New York
2008	The Rainbow Troops	Laskar pelangi	Indonesia	Riri Riza	New York
2008	Rough Cut	영화는 영화다	South Korea	Jang Hoon	North American
2009	Samurai Princess	サムライプリンセス 外道姫	Japan	Kengo Kaji	North American
2008	Snakes and Earrings	蛇にピアス	Japan	Yukio Ninagawa	North American
2009	Tactical Unit – Comrades in Arms	机动部队 – 同袍	Hong Kong	Law Wing-cheung	North American
2008	Tokyo Gore Police	東京残酷警察	Japan	Yoshihiro Nishimura	
2008	Tokyo Gore Laborer	東京残酷ドカタ	Japan	Yoshiki Takahashi	
2008	The Heroine of My Adolescence	ザヒロインオブマイアドウレセンス	Japan	Asuka Ishii	
2008	63 Minutes In The Movie...		Japan	Yoshihiro Nishimura	
2008	Vacation	休暇	Japan	Hajime Kadoi	New York
2009	Vampire Girl vs. Frankenstein Girl	吸血少女対少女フランケン	Japan	Yoshihiro Nishimura, Naoyuki Tomomatsu	World
2007	The Warlords	投名狀	Hong Kong China	Peter Chan	New York
2009	Written By	再生号	Hong Kong	Wai Ka-fai	World
2008	When the Full Moon Rises	Kala malam bulan mengambang	Malaysia	Mamat Khalid	North American
2009	Yoroi: The Samurai Zombie	鎧 サムライゾンビ	Japan	Tak Sakaguchi	New York

The 9th New York Asian Film Festival presented the following films from the 7th Mise-en-scène Short Film Festival:

Year	Title	Original title	Country	Director
2008	Love Is Protein		South Korea	Yeon Sang-ho
2008	Auld Lang Syne	올드 랭 사인	South Korea	So Joon-Moon
2008	Eden	에덴	South Korea	Kim Hye-Won
2008	Lioness(es)	암사자(들)	South Korea	Hong Jae-Hee
2008	Shaggy-Dog Story	이제는 말할 수 있다	South Korea	Jeong Seung-Koo
2008	Stop	스탑	South Korea	Park Jae-Ok
2008	The Unbearable Heaviness of Nagging	잔소리	South Korea	Choi Jeong-Yeol
2007	Wanted	원티드	South Korea	Kim Woon-Ki
2008	Enemy's Apple	적의 사과	South Korea	Lee Su-jin
2007	A Coffee Vending Machine	무림일검의 사생활	South Korea	Chang Hyung-Yun, Shim Gap-seop

=== 2008 ===
Screenings were held from June 20 – July 6, 2008 at the IFC Center and Japan Society.

Year	Title	Original title	Country	Director	Premiere Status
2007	Accuracy of Death	死神の精度 (Sweet Rain)	Japan	Masaya Kakei	New York
2008	Action Boys	우린 액션배우다	South Korea	Jung Byung-gil	International
2007	Adrift in Tokyo	転々	Japan	Satoshi Miki	North American
2005	Always: Sunset on Third Street	ALWAYS 三丁目の夕日	Japan	Takashi Yamazaki	
2007	Always: Sunset on Third Street 2	ALWAYS 続・三丁目の夕日	Japan	Takashi Yamazaki	New York
2007	Assembly	集結號	China	Feng Xiaogang	North American
2006	ARCH ANGELS	笑う大天使（ミカエル）	Japan	Issei Oda	New York
2004	The Bodyguard	บอดี้การ์ดหน้าเหลี่ยม	Thailand	Panna Rittikrai; Mum Jokmok	New York
2007	The Bodyguard 2	บอดี้การ์ดหน้าเหลี่ยม 2	Thailand	Panna Rittikrai; Mum Jokmok	North American
2007	The Butcher	도살자	South Korea	Kim Jin-won	International
2008	OneChanbara	お姉チャンバラ The Movie	Japan	Yohei Fukuda	International
2007	Dainipponjin	大日本人 (Big Man Japan)	Japan	Hitoshi Matsumoto	New York
2007	Dog In A Sidecar	サイドカーに犬	Japan	Kichitaro Negishi	North American
2007	Dororo	どろろ	Japan	Akihiko Shiota	North American
2007	Fine, Totally Fine	全然大丈夫	Japan	Yosuke Fujita	North American
2007	Happiness	행복	South Korea	Hur Jin-ho	US
2007	Kala		Indonesia	Joko Anwar	US
2007	King Naresuan		Thailand	Chatrichalerm Yukol	US
2007	King Naresuan 2		Thailand	Chatrichalerm Yukol	New York
2007	L: Change the World	Lの本当の秘密	Japan	Hideo Nakata	North American
2007	Like a Dragon	龍が如く 劇場版	Japan	Takashi Miike	
2006	Love On Sunday	恋する日曜日	Japan	Ryūichi Hiroki	North American
2007	Love On Sunday 2: Last Words	恋する日曜日 私。恋した	Japan	Ryūichi Hiroki	North American
2007	M		South Korea	Lee Myung-se	US
2007	Mad Detective	神探	Hong Kong	Johnnie To; Wai Ka-fai	New York
2008	The Most Beautiful Night In The World	世界で一番美しい夜	Japan	Daisuke Tengan	International
2008	Public Enemy Returns	강철중: 공공의 적 1-1	South Korea	Kang Woo-suk	International
2007	The Rebel		Vietnam	Charlie Nguyen	New York
2003	Retro Game Master: Ghosts & Goblins	ゲームセンターCX	Japan		
2003	Retro Game Master: Mystery of Atlantis	ゲームセンターCX	Japan		
2007	Sad Vacation	サッド ヴァケイション	Japan	Shinji Aoyama	US
2008	Sasori	さそり	Hong Kong Japan	Joe Ma	North American
2007	The Shadow Spirit	魍魎の匣	Japan	Masato Harada	North American
2007	Shadows in the Palace	궁녀	South Korea	Kim Mee-jeung	New York
2008	Shamo	军鸡	Hong Kong	Cheang Pou-soi	North American
2008	Sparrow	文雀	Hong Kong	Johnnie To; Wai Ka-fai	New York
2006	Strawberry Shortcakes	ストロベリーショートケイクス	Japan	Hitoshi Yazaki	New York
2007	Sukiyaki Western Django	キヤキ・ウエスタン ジャンゴ	Japan	Takashi Miike	New York
2008	Tamami: The Baby's Curse	赤んぼ少女	Japan	Yūdai Yamaguchi	International
2008	Then Summer Came	たみおのしあわせ	Japan	Ryo Iwamatsu	World
2007	The World Of Ours	俺たちの世界	Japan	Ryo Nakajima	New York
2008	Tokyo Gore Police	東京残酷警察	Japan	Yoshihiro Nishimura	North American
2007	United Red Army	実録・連合赤軍 あさま山荘への道程（みち）	Japan	Kōji Wakamatsu	North American
2007	X-Cross	エクスクロス 魔境伝説	Japan	Kenta Fukasaku	New York
2008	Yasukuni	靖国	Japan China	Li Ying	New York

The 8th New York Asian Film Festival presented the following films from the 6th Mise-en-scène Short Film Festival:

Year	Title	Original title	Country	Director
2006	Son's	아들의 것	South Korea	Lee Su-jin
2006	Art of War	단편 손자병법	South Korea	Kwon Hyeok-Jae
2007	Sam Peckinpah: A Retrospective	샘 퍼킨파 회고전	South Korea	Chun Nam-Suk
2007	How To Make A Motion Picture		South Korea	Lim Sung-Hyun
2007	Everyone, Shut Up!	수다쟁이들	South Korea	Ko Tae-Jeong
2007	The French Lieutenant's Wife	프랑스 중위의 여자	South Korea	Baek Seung-Bin
2007	Watermellon Chicken	수박 병아리	South Korea	Won Jong-Shik
2007	A Puppy, Our Family	가족 같은 개, 개 같은 가족	South Korea	Park Soo-Young & Park Jae-Young

=== 2007 ===
Screenings were held from June 22 – July 8, 2007 at the IFC Center and Japan Society.

Year	Title	Original title	Country	Director	Premiere Status
2006	Aachi & Ssipak	아치와 씨팍	South Korea	Jo Boem-jin	New York
2006	After This Our Exile	(父子	Hong Kong	Patrick Tam	New York
2006	The Banquet	夜宴	China	Feng Xiaogang	New York
2006	Big Bang Love, Juvenile A	46億年の恋	Japan	Takashi Miike	US
2006	The City of Violence	짝패	South Korea	Ryoo Seung-wan	New York
2006	Cruel Winter Blues	열혈남아	South Korea	Lee Jeong-beom	New York
2006	Dasepo Naughty Girls	다세포 소녀	South Korea	E J-yong	New York
2006	Death Note	デスノート	Japan	Shusuke Kaneko	New York
2006	Death Note 2: The Last Name	デスノート the Last name	Japan	Shusuke Kaneko	New York
2006	Dog Bite Dog	狗咬狗	Hong Kong	Soi Cheang	New York
2006	Dynamite Warrior	ฅนไฟบิน	Thailand	Chalerm Wongpim	North American
2007	Exte	エクステ	Japan	Sion Sono	North American
2006	Exiled	放‧逐	Hong Kong	Johnnie To	
2007	Freesia (Bullets Over Tears)	フリージア	Japan	Kazuyoshi Kumakiri	North American
2006	Gamera the Brave	小さき勇者たち～ガメラ	Japan	Ryuta Tasaki	New York
2007	Getting Home	落叶归根	China	Zhang Yang	New York
1992	Hard Boiled	辣手神探	Hong Kong	John Woo	
2006	Hula Girls	フラガール	Japan	Lee Sang-il	
2006	Hell's Ground	Zibahkhana	Pakistan	Omar Khan	New York
2006	I'm a Cyborg, But That's OK	싸이보그지만 괜찮아	South Korea	Park Chan-wook	New York
2007	Miracle on 1st Street	1번가의 기적	South Korea	Yoon Je-kyoon	New York
2006	Memories of Matsuko	嫌われ松子の一生	Japan	Tetsuya Nakashima	North American
2005	Never Belongs To Me	삼거리 무스탕 소년의 최후	South Korea	Nam Ki-woong	North American
2006	Nightmare Detective	悪夢探偵	Japan	Shinya Tsukamoto	New York
2006	Retribution	叫	Japan	Kiyoshi Kurosawa	
2007	The Show Must Go On	우아한 세계	South Korea	Han Jae-rim	North American
2006	Traces of Love	가을로	South Korea	Kim Dae-seung	North American
2006	Trouble Makers	光荣的愤怒	China	Cao Baoping	US
2006	Yo-Yo Girl Cop	スケバン刑事 コードネーム=麻宮サキ	Japan	Kenta Fukasaku	North American
2004	Zebraman	ゼブラーマン	Japan	Takashi Miike	US

The 7th New York Asian Film Festival presented following films from the 5th Mise-en-scène Short Film Festival:

Year	Title	Original title	Country	Director
2006	Do You Wanna Baby?	베이베를 워하세요?	South Korea	Lee Sang-geun
2006	Gahee & B.H.	가희와 BH	South Korea	Shing Dong-seok
2005	2 Minutes	2분	South Korea	Jung Tae-kyung
2006	Illegal Parking	불법주차	South Korea	Jeong Chung-hwan
2006	My Small Doll House	나의 작은 인형상자	South Korea	Jung Yu-mi
2006	Good Girl	착한 아이	South Korea	Kang Hae-yun
2006	Hae Woo So	해우소	South Korea	Choi Byeong-hwan
2006	Burning Coals On His Head		South Korea	Cho Hyoung-chan
2001	A Talented Boy Lee Jun Seop		South Korea	Shin Jane
2002	Adolescence		South Korea	Jae Chang-gyu
2004	Memories of Oldboy		South Korea	Kim Min-suk
2005	About A Bad Boy		South Korea	Park Shin-woo
2004	How To Operate A Polaroid Camera		South Korea	Kim Jong-kwan
2005	The Freaking Family		South Korea	Park Soo-young

=== 2006 ===
Screenings were held from June 16 – July 1, 2006 at Anthology Film Archives and The ImaginAsian.

Year	Title	Original title	Country	Director	Premiere Status
2004	Ab Tak Chhappan		India	Shimit Amin	New York
2005	Always – Sunset On Third Street	ALWAYS 続・三丁目の夕日	Japan	Takashi Yamazaki	North American
2005	Art of the Devil 2	ลองของ	Thailand	The Ronin Team	US
2005	Beetle, The Horn King	兜王ビートル	Japan	Minoru Kawasaki	US
2005	A Bittersweet Life	달콤한 인생	South Korea	Kim Jee-won	New York
2005	Blood Rain	혈의 누	South Korea	Kim Dae-seung	US
2002	Company		India	Ram Gopal Varma	
2005	Cromartie High School	魁!!クロマティ高校	Japan	Yudai Yamaguchi	New York
2005	Duelist	형사	South Korea	Lee Myung-se	New York
2004	Ek Hasina Thi		India	Sriram Raghavan	
2004	Feathers in the Wind	깃	South Korea	Song Il-gon	North American
2005	Funky Forest: The First Contact	ナイスの森 THE FIRST CONTACT	Japan	Katsuhito Ishii	New York
2005	Gangster		Malaysia	Bade Haji Azmi	US
2005	The Great Yokai War	妖怪大戦争	Japan	Takashi Miike	New York
2004	Hair	털	South Korea	Jang Jun-hwan	World
2005	It's Only Talk		Japan	Ryūichi Hiroki	New York
2006	Krrish	कृष	India	Rakesh Roshan	US
2005	Linda Linda Linda	リンダ リンダ リンダ	Japan	Nobuhiro Yamashita	New York
2005	The Magicians	마법사들	South Korea	Song Il-gon	North American
2005	Oh! My Zombie Mermaid	あゝ!一軒家プロレス	Japan	Naoki Kudo	US
2004	Pacchigi! We Shall Overcome Someday	パッチギ！	Japan	Kazuyuki Izutsu	US
2005	Peacock	孔雀	China	Gu Changwei	New York
2005	Shinobi		Japan	Ten Shimoyama	New York
2005	Shiva		India	Ram Gopal Varma	World
2005	Ski Jumping Pairs: Road to Torino 2006	スキージャンプ・ペア ~Road to TORINO 2006	Japan	Riichiro Mashima, Masaki Kobayashi	US
2006	Ski Jumping Pairs 2007: Flying Test		Japan	Riichiro Mashima	
2005	A Stranger of Mine	運命じゃない人	Japan	Kenji Uchida	US
2006	Umizaru 2: Test of Trust	Limit of Love 海猿	Japan	Eiichiro Hasumi	International
2005	Welcome to Dongmakgol	웰컴 투 동막골	South Korea	Park Kwang-hyun	US

=== 2005 ===
Screenings were held from June 17 – July 2, 2005 at Anthology Film Archives and The ImaginAsian.

Year	Title	Original title	Country	Director	Premiere Status
2004	Arahan	아라한 장풍 대작전	South Korea	Ryoo Seung-wan	New York
2005	Crazy N' the City	神经侠侣	Hong Kong	James Yuen	North American
2005	Crying Fist	주먹이 운다	South Korea	Ryoo Seung-wan	North American
2004	Electric Shadows	夢影童年	China	Xiao Jiang	North American
2004	A Family	가족	South Korea	Lee Jeong-cheol	North American
2004	Gagamboy		Philippines	Erik Matti	US
2004	Godzilla Final Wars	ゴジラ ファイナルウォーズ	Japan	Ryuhei Kitamura	New York
2003	Green Chair	녹색 의자	South Korea	Park Chul-soo	US
2004	Hana and Alice	花とアリス	Japan	Shunji Iwai	New York
2003	Josee, the Tiger and the Fish	ジョゼと虎と魚たち	Japan	Isshin Inudo	New York
2004	Kamikaze Girls	下妻物語——ヤンキーちゃんとロリータちゃん	Japan	Tetsuya Nakashima	New York
2004	Karaoke Terror	昭和歌謡大全集	Japan	Tetsuya Nakashima	New York
2004	Kekexili: Mountain Patrol	可可西里	China	Lu Chuan	New York
2004	Late Bloomer	おそいひと	Japan	Go Shibata	New York
2005	Marathon	말아톤	South Korea	Jeong Yoon-cheol	International
2005	Marebito	稀人	Japan	Takashi Shimizu	New York
2004	Mind Game	マインド・ゲーム	Japan	Masaaki Yuasa	International
2005	My Brother Nikhil		India	Onir	
2004	One Nite in Mongkok	旺角黑夜	Hong Kong	Derek Yee	New York
2004	P		Thailand	Paul Spurrier	US
2005	Princess Raccoon	オペレッタ狸御殿	Japan	Seijun Suzuki	North American
2004	R-Point	알 포인트	South Korea	Kong Su-chang	New York
2004	Samaritan Girl	사마리아	South Korea	Kim Ki-duk	US
2002	A Snake of June	六月の蛇	Japan	Shinya Tsukamoto	North American
2004	Someone Special	아는 여자	South Korea	Jang Jin	New York
2004	Survive Style 5+		Japan	Gen Sekiguchi	New York
2004	The Taste of Tea	茶の味	Japan	Katsuhito Ishii	US
2004	Tetsujin-28	鉄人28号	Japan	Shin Togashi	North American
2004	Three...Extremes	三更2 (Chinese) 쓰리, 몬스터 (Korean) 美しい夜、残酷な朝 (Japan)	Hong Kong South Korea Japan	Takashi Miike, Park Chan-wook, Fruit Chan	New York
2004	University of Laughs	笑の大学	Japan	Mamoru Hoshi	North American
2003	Vital	ヴィタール	Japan	Shinya Tsukamoto	

=== 2004 ===
Screenings were held from June 18–27, 2004 at Anthology Film Archives.

Year	Title	Original title	Country	Director	Premiere Status
2003	Antenna	アンテナ	Japan	Kazuyoshi Kumakiri	US
2003	Azumi	あずみ	Japan	Ryuhei Kitamura	New York
2003	OK Baytong	โอเค เบตง	Thailand	Nonzee Nimibutr	New York
2004	Dance with the Wind	바람의 전설	South Korea	Park Jung-woo	North American
2003	Doppelganger	ドッペルゲンガー	Japan	Kiyoshi Kurosawa	New York
2002	Drive	ドッペルゲンガー	Japan	Sabu	New York
2002	Hero	英雄	China	Zhang Yimou	New York
2002	Infernal Affairs	無間道系列	Hong Kong	Andrew Lau; Alan Mak	
2003	Juon: The Grudge	呪怨じゅおん	Japan	Takashi Shimizu	
2003	Juon: The Grudge 2	呪怨じゅおん2	Japan	Takashi Shimizu	US
2003	Legend of the Evil Lake	천년호	South Korea	Lee Gwang-hun	New York
2003	Like Asura	阿修羅のごとく	Japan	Yoshimitsu Morita	US
2003	Macabre Case of Prom Pi Ram	คืนบาป พรหมพิราม	Thailand	Manop Udomdej	US
2004	Marronnier	マロニエ	Japan	Hideyuki Kobayashi	New York
2003	Please Teach Me English	영어완전정복	South Korea	Kim Sung-su	New York
2003	The Road Taken	선택	South Korea	Hong Gi-seon	New York
2003	Running on Karma	大隻佬	Hong Kong	Johnnie To, Wai Ka-fai	New York
2004	Umizaru	海猿	Japan	Eiichiro Hasumi	International
2003	Vibrator	ヴァイブレータ	Japan	Ryūichi Hiroki	
2003	When the Last Sword is Drawn	壬生義士伝	Japan	Yōjirō Takita	US
1963	Zatoichi 3: New Tale of Zatoichi	新・座頭市物語	Japan	Tokuzo Tanaka	
1963	Zatoichi 4: The Fugitive	座頭市兇状旅	Japan	Tokuzo Tanaka	
1963	Zatoichi 5: On The Road	座頭市喧嘩旅	Japan	Kimiyoshi Yasuda	

=== 2003 ===
Screenings were held from May 15–26, 2003 at Anthology Film Archives.

Year	Title	Original title	Country	Director	Premiere Status
1997	Bounce Ko Gals	バウンス ko GALS	Japan	Masato Harada	
2002	Break Out	라이터를 켜라	South Korea	Jang Hang-jun	International
2002	Company		India	Ram Gopal Varma	
2003	Double Agent	이중간첩	South Korea	Kim Hyun-jeong	International
2002	Double Vision	雙瞳	Taiwan	Chen Kuo-fu	New York
2002	Graveyard of Honor	新・仁義の墓場	Japan	Takashi Miike	New York
2001	Ichi the Killer	殺し屋1	Japan	Takashi Miike	
2002	Just One Look	一碌蔗	Hong Kong	Riley Yip	North American
2001	Killer Tattoo	มือปืน/โลก/พระ/จัน	Thailand	Yuthlert Sippapak	New York
1993	The Bride with White Hair	白髮魔女傳	Hong Kong	Ronny Yu	
2002	My Beautiful Days	스물 넷	South Korea	Im Jong-jae	US
2002	Out		Japan	Hideyuki Hirayama	North American
2002	Over the Rainbow	오버 더 레인보우	South Korea	Ahn Jin-woo	North American
2002	Phone	더 폰	South Korea	Ahn Byung-ki	North American
2002	Ping Pong	ピンポン	Japan	Fumihiko Sori	New York
2002	Resurrection of the Little Match Girl	성냥팔이 소녀의 재림	South Korea	Jang Sun-woo	US
2002	Runaway Pistol	走火槍	Hong Kong	Lam Wah-Chuen	North American
2002	So Close	夕陽天使	Hong Kong	Corey Yuen	New York
2002	Sympathy for Mr. Vengeance	복수는 나의 것	South Korea	Park Chan-wook	New York
2002	Too Young To Die	죽어도 좋아	South Korea	Park Jin-pyo	
2000	Versus	VERSUS -ヴァーサス	Japan	Ryuhei Kitamura	

=== 2002 ===
Screenings were held from April 26 – May 2, 2002 at Anthology Film Archives.

Year	Title	Original title	Country	Director
2001	Bang Rajan	บางระจัน	Thailand	Tanit Jitnukul
2000	Comeuppance	天有眼	Hong Kong	Derek Chiu
1998	Dil Se..	दिल से	India	Mani Ratnam
2000	Freeze Me	フリーズ・ミー	Japan	Takashi Ishii
1996	Gamera 2: The Advent of Legion	ガメラ2 レギオン襲来	Japan	Shusuke Kaneko
1999	Gamera 3: The Revenge of Iris	ガメラ3 邪神〈イリス〉覚醒	Japan	Shusuke Kaneko
2001	Kick the Moon	신라의 달밤	South Korea	Kim Sang-jin
2001	My Sassy Girl	엽기적인 그녀	South Korea	Kwak Jae-yong
2001	One Fine Spring Day	봄날은 간다	South Korea	Hur Jin-ho
2001	Pistol Opera	ピストルオペラ	Japan	Seijun Suzuki
2001	Visitor Q	ビジターQ	Japan	Takashi Miike

== Audience Award ==
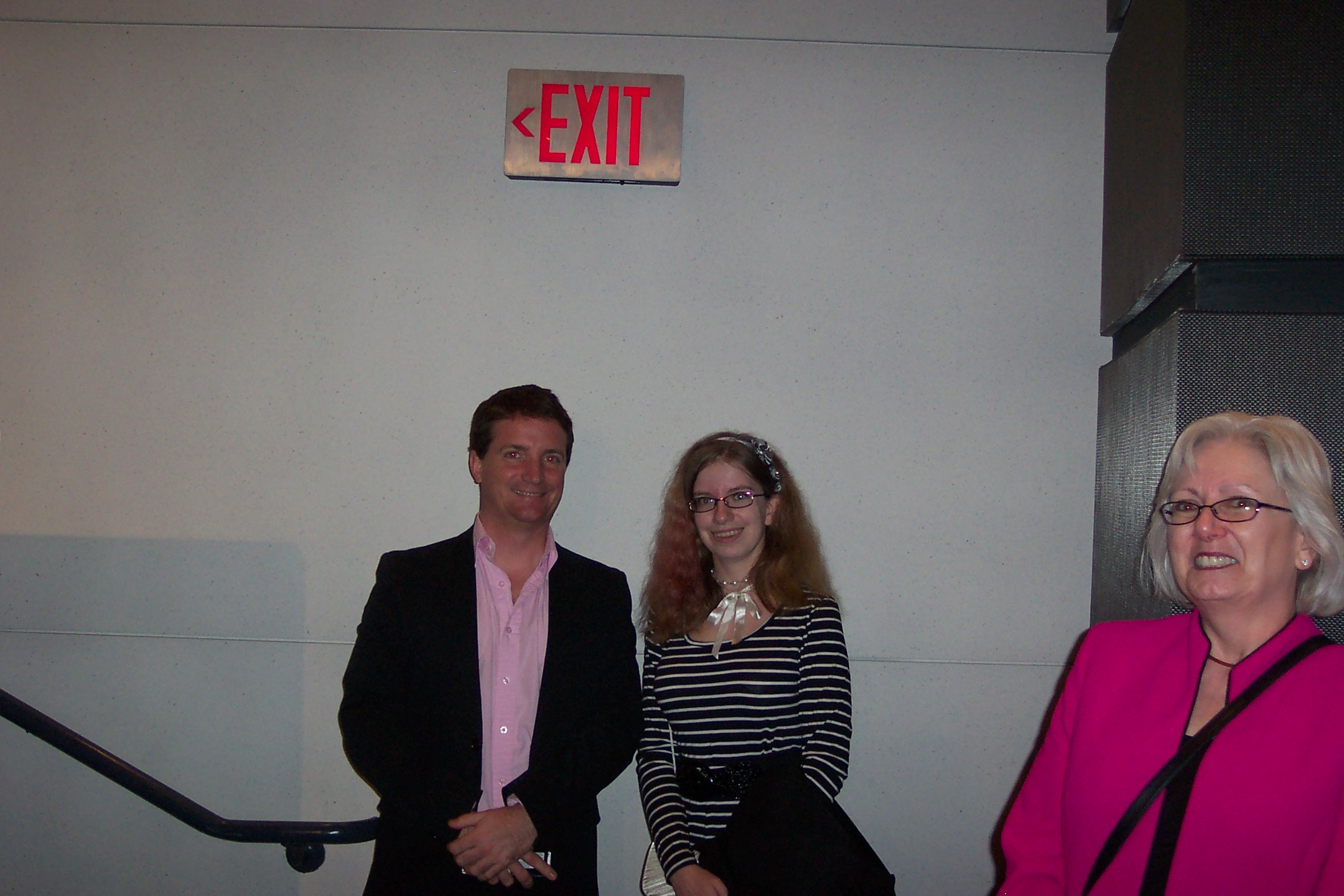
(left to right) Grady Hendrix (New York Asian Film Festival founding member) and Alexandra Swords (radio personality) in 2002

Year	Title	Original Title	Country	Director
2002	My Sassy Girl	엽기적인 그녀	South Korea	Kwak Jae-yong
2003	Ping Pong	ピンポン	Japan	Fumihiko Sori
2004	Please Teach Me English	영어완전정복	South Korea	Kim Sung-su
2005	The Taste of Tea	茶の味	Japan	Katsuhito Ishii
2006	Always: Sunset on Third Street	ALWAYS 三丁目の夕日	Japan	Takashi Yamazaki
2007	Memories of Matsuko	嫌われ松子の一生	Japan	Tetsuya Nakashima
2008	Fine, Totally Fine	全然大丈夫	Japan	Yosuke Fujita
2009	The Magic Hour	ザ・マジックアワー	Japan	Kōki Mitani
2010	Gallants	打擂台	Hong Kong	Derek Kwok, Clement Cheng
2010	Castaway on the Moon	김씨 표류기	South Korea	Lee Hae-jun
2011	A Boy and His Samurai	ちょんまげぷりん	Japan	Yoshihiro Nakamura
2012	Ace Attorney	逆転裁判	Japan	Takashi Miike
2013	Hentai Kamen	変態仮面	Japan	Yūichi Fukuda
2014	Uzumasa Limelight	太秦ライムライト	Japan	Ken Ochiai
2014	Zone Pro Site	總舖師：移動大廚	Taiwan	Chen Yu-hsun
2015	The Royal Tailor	상의원	South Korea	Lee Won-suk
2016	Too Young to Die!	若くして死ぬ	Japan	Kankurō Kudō
2017	Close-Knit	彼らが本気で編むときは、	Japan	Naoko Ogigami
2021	Americanish		United States	Iman K. Zawahry
2021	Junk Head		Japan	Takahide Hori
2022	Chilli Laugh Story	闔家辣	Hong Kong	Coba Cheng
2022	Perhaps Love	장르만 로맨스	South Korea	Jo Eun-ji
2023	Marry My Dead Body	關於我和鬼變成家人的那件事	Taiwan	Cheng Wei-hao
2024	How To Make Millions Before Grandma Dies	หลานม่า	Thailand	Pat Boonnitipat

== Uncaged Award for Best Feature Film ==
Year	Title	Original Title	Country	Director
2008	Sad Vacation	サッド ヴァケイション	Japan	Shinji Aoyama
2009	Love Exposure	愛のむきだし	Japan	Sion Sono
2017	Bad Genius	ฉลาดเกมส์โกง	Thailand	Nattawut Poonpiriya
2018	Microhabitat	소공녀	South Korea	Jeon Go-woon
2019	Lying to Mom	鈴木家の	Japan	Katsumi Nojiri
2020	Moving On	남매의 여름밤	South Korea	Yoon Dan-Bi
2021	Anima	莫尔道嘎	China	Jinling Cao
2022	The Sales Girl	Худалдагч охин	Mongolia	Janchivdorj Sengedorj
2023	Abang Adik	富都青年	Malaysia	Jin Ong
2024	Snow in Midsummer	五月雪	Malaysia	Chong Keat Aun

== Daniel A. Craft Award for Excellence in Action Cinema ==
Year	Winner	Country	Director/Actor/Title
2013	Ip Man: The Final Fight 葉問：終極一戰	Hong Kong	Herman Yau
2014	The White Storm 掃毒	Hong Kong	Benny Chan
2015	Vengeance of an Assassin ตัวอย่าง เร็วทะลุเร็ว	Thailand	Panna Rittikrai
2016	The Bodyguard 特工爺爺	Hong Kong	Yue Song
2017	The Villainess 악녀	South Korea	Jung Byung-gil
2017	Hapkido 合氣道	Hong Kong	Angela Mao
2018	Operation Red Sea 红海行动	ChinaHong Kong	Dante Lam
2019	Master Z 葉問外傳：張天志	ChinaHong Kong	Yuen Woo-ping
2020	Silat Warriors: Deed of Death (Geran)	Malaysia	Areel Abu Bakar
2021	Spiritwalker 유체이탈자	South Korea	Yoon Kye-sang
2022	Jang Hyuk	South Korea	For The Swordsman and The Killer: A Girl Who Deserves to Die
2023	Lee Thongkham	Thailand	For Kitty the Killer
2024	Yugo Sakamoto	Japan	Baby Assassins: Nice Days
2026	Yeon Sang-ho	South Korea	Excellence In Action Cinema

== Star Asia Award ==
Year	Actor/Actress	Country
2010	Simon Yam	Hong Kong
2012	Donnie Yen	Hong Kong
2014	Sandra Ng	Hong Kong
2014	Sul Kyung-gu	South Korea
2015	Aaron Kwok	Hong Kong
2016	Miriam Yeung	Hong Kong
2016	Lee Byung-hun	South Korea
2016	John Lloyd Cruz	Philippines
2017	Gang Dong-won	South Korea
2018	Kim Yoon-seok	South Korea
2018	Jiang Wu	China
2021	Gordon Lam	Hong Kong
2022	Hiroshi Abe	Japan
2023	Louis Koo	Hong Kong
2024	Nicholas Tse	Hong Kong

== Star Asia Lifetime Achievement Award ==
Year	Actor/Actress	Country
2011	Tsui Hark	China
2012	Jeong Chang-hwa	South Korea
2013	Jackie Chan	Hong Kong
2013	Tsai Yang-ming	Taiwan
2014	Jimmy Wang Yu	Taiwan
2015	Ringo Lam	Hong Kong
2016	Shunji Iwai	Japan
2017	Tony Leung Ka-fai	Hong Kong
2018	Masato Harada	Japan
2019	Yuen Woo-ping	Hong Kong
2021	Ann Hui	Hong Kong
2022	Takashi Shimizu	Japan
2023	Junji Sakamoto	Japan
2024	Zhang Jianian (Tai Bo)	Hong Kong

== Star Hong Kong Lifetime Achievement Award ==
Year	Actor/Actress	Country
2017	Eric Tsang	Hong Kong

== Screen International Rising Star Asia Award (a.k.a. Rising Star Award) ==
Year	Actor/Actress	Country
2009	Gong Hyo-jin	South Korea
2009	So Ji-sub	South Korea
2010	Huang Bo	China
2011	Takayuki Yamada	Japan
2012	Masami Nagasawa	Japan
2012	Michelle Chen	Taiwan
2013	Kim Go-eun	South Korea
2014	Fumi Nikaidō	Japan
2015	Shōta Sometani	Japan
2016	Gō Ayano	Japan
2016	Therese Malvar	Philippines
2016	Jelly Lin	China
2017	Chutimon Chuengcharoensukying	Thailand
2018	Stephy Tang	Hong Kong
2019	Ryu Jun-yeol	South Korea
2019	Nana Komatsu	Japan
2020	Joo-Young Lee	South Korea
2021	Sosuke Ikematsu	Japan
2021	Janine Gutierrez	Philippines
2021	Bang Min-ah	South Korea
2022	Kim Hye-yoon	South Korea
2022	Urassaya Sperbund	Thailand
2023	Ryohei Suzuki	Japan
2024	Lee Hye-ri	South Korea

== Best from the East Award ==
Year	Actor/Actress	Country	Ref.
2022	Ryu Seung-ryong	South Korea	
2023	Lee Hanee	South Korea	
2024	Kento Yamazaki	Japan	
2025	Vivian Sung	Taiwan	
2026	Joseph Chang	Taiwan	

== The Celebrity Award ==
Year	Actor/Actress	Country
2014	Park Joong-hoon	South Korea

== See also ==
- Asian cinema
