= Suangporn Jaturaphut =

Thai actress

- Born: 1988 (age 37–38); Thailand
- Education: Assumption University
- Occupation: Actress
- Years active: 2005–present

Suangporn Jaturaphut (born 1988) is a Thai actress.

Suangporn grew up with her mother in the slums of Bangkok, Thailand after her father left the family. While growing up, Suangporn's mother made sure she went to school and became educated to get a career and avoid falling into prostitution when she got older. Suangporn learned English and Chinese, swimming, and computer skills in school.

In her teens, she wanted to become an actress to help pay for her mother's medical bills and turned to an aunt who worked in Thai soap operas. Suangporn's aunt refused to help, so at age seventeen she became determined to become an actress independently. She found an agent who eventually helped her find a minor role in Paul Spurrier's film P. The actress who was originally supposed to play the main protagonist Aaw/Dau quit the production the same day Suangporn showed up to rehearse her two scenes. She asked to read for the lead role of Aaw/Dau by doing a scene in which the character weeps, and she won the part. Since Suangporn was still seventeen, some of her scenes with sexual content were toned down. She had no acting experience prior to this.

"The character of Dau appears in many scenes in the film, and so the filming hours were long and tough. Equally tough was the learning curve. Suangporn had no established acting tricks or techniques. If her performance was to work, it would have to be based on instinct and real emotion."

After the completion of the film, Suangporn gave all the money she earned to her mother to pay for a medical operation. The filmmakers assisted Suangporn in enrolling into the Assumption University, where she studied for a B.A. in Chinese for Business.

Suangporn's nickname is Fern.

== Filmography ==
- P (2005) – Aaw/Dau
