= The Forest (2016 Thai film) =

- ป่า
- Directed by: Paul Spurrier
- Written by: Paul Spurrier
- Produced by: Jiriya Spurrier
- Starring: Wannasa Wintawong; Tanapol Kamkunkam; Asanee Suwan
- Cinematography: Paul Spurrier
- Edited by: Paul Spurrier
- Music by: Paul Spurrier
- Production company: Commercial Films Siam
- Release date: 9 March 2016 (Cinequest Festival)
- Running time: 109 minutes
- Country: Thailand
- Languages: Thai; Isaan

The Forest (Thai title: ป่า) is a 2016 Thai supernatural horror film written, directed, shot and edited by English filmmaker Paul Spurrier, with the help of his wife Jiriya, and starring two first-time child actors and Asanee Suwan. The screenplay in its original language form was translated by one Preeyaporn Chareonbutra, who had done likewise with Spurrier's previous Thai film production, P.

The story follows a former monk who has joined the teaching profession and is recently assigned by the education ministry to work at a grade school in a small village of an Isaan rural area, and it also follows one of his students, a bullied girl who encounters a mysterious wild boy in the woods neighboring the village, but this boy is merely wild in the sense of how he lives alone in the forest, subsisting bereft of clothing, tools and shelter, as he otherwise is ever articulate and well kept, like the human embodiment of an idea. The schoolgirl is unable to vocally communicate with anybody except for the forest boy. Her inability to speak has been the subject of ridicule and abuse by her classmates.

== Cast ==
- Wannasa Wintawong as Ja, the bullied schoolgirl
- Tanapol Kamkunkam as the boy of the forest
- Asanee Suwan as Preecha, the new teacher
- Pongsanart Vinsiri as the headmaster
- Thidarat Kongkaew as Nittaya, the heralding teacher
- Vithaya Pansringarm as the village headman
- Schoolchildren:
  - Natpatson Lhakkum as Waan
  - Papada Chompurat as Tairn
  - Jantimaporn Punkok as Bim
  - Pawina Netta as Pim
- Ramphai Wintawong as Ja's father
- Kan-ha Khamkhunkham as the first poacher
- Tanapol Kamkunkam as the second poacher
- Nirut Romyen as the scary villager

== Production ==
To choose the filming location, Paul Spurrier drove 3,000 km (1,900 mi) in Isan, and eventually settled on a school in the city of Udon Thani. He cast the film by auditioning residents, including schoolchildren, from the area.
