= The Last Days of the World =

- Directed by: Eiji Uchida
- Written by: Eiji Uchida
- Release date: July 4, 2011 (New York Asian Film Festival)
- Running time: 95 minutes
- Country: Japan
- Language: Japanese

The Last Days of the World (世界最後の日々, Sekai Saigo no Hibi) is a 2011 Japanese film directed by Eiji Uchida. It screened at the 2011 New York Asian Film Festival. The film is based on Naoki Yamamoto's manga of the same title.
