= The Inerasable =

- Poster

Japanese name
- Kanji: 残穢 -住んではいけない部屋-
Transcriptions
- Revised Hepburn: Zan’e: Sunde wa ikenai heya
- Directed by: Yoshihiro Nakamura
- Screenplay by: Kenichi Suzuki
- Based on: Zang-e by Fuyumi Ono
- Produced by: Yoshihiro Nakamura; Fumitsugu Ikeda
- Starring: Yūko Takeuchi; Ai Hashimoto; Kentaro Sakaguchi
- Cinematography: Yukihiro Okimura
- Edited by: Hiroaki Morishita
- Music by: Goro Yasukawa
- Production company: Happinet
- Distributed by: Shochiku
- Release dates: October 25, 2015 (Tokyo); January 30, 2016
- Running time: 107 minutes
- Country: Japan
- Language: Japanese
- Box office: US$3.9 million (Japan)

The Inerasable (Japanese: 残穢 -住んではいけない部屋-, Hepburn: Zan'e: Sunde wa ikenai heya) is a 2015 Japanese horror mystery film directed by Yoshihiro Nakamura and starring Yūko Takeuchi. The film is based on Zan-e, a horror novel by Fuyumi Ono. It had its world premiere at the 28th Tokyo International Film Festival, where it was in competition, on October 25, 2015. The film was released in Japan by Shochiku on January 30, 2016.

== Plot ==
Ai is a mystery novel writer. She received a letter from Kubo, a reader of her novel and a university student. Kubo's letter states that she hears odd sounds from the room where she lives now. Ai becomes interested by the letter and they being to investigate. Ai and Kubo learn of people that lived in the apartment and their experiences including a suicide and murder.

== Cast ==
- Yūko Takeuchi as I
- Ai Hashimoto as Ms. Kubo
- Kentaro Sakaguchi as Koichi Amikawa / Peace
- Kenichi Takitō
- Kuranosuke Sasaki

== Production ==
The film is based on Zang-e, a horror novel by Fuyumi Ono.

== Release ==
The film was in competition at the 28th Tokyo International Film Festival, where it had its world premiere on October 25, 2015. It was released in Japan on January 30, 2016.

== Reception ==
The film was 5th placed in admissions and gross on its opening weekend, with 82,182 admissions and ¥110,637,600 in gross. On its second weekend, it remained in 5th place in both admissions and gross, with US$501,418 in gross. On the 3rd weekend it was again 5th placed by gross, with US$364,313, but dropped to 6th place in admissions. On the 4th weekend, it dropped to 9th place by gross, with US$243,835. As of February 21, the film had grossed US$3,878,793 in Japan.

Deborah Young of The Hollywood Reporter called the film "a nicely constructed tale, but too tame to scare anybody."
