= Miami Connection =

1987 American film directed by Y.K. Kim

- Theatrical release poster
- Directed by: Richard Park (Park Woo-Sang); Y.K. Kim
- Screenplay by: Joseph Diamond
- Story by: Richard Park; Y.K. Kim
- Produced by: Y.K. Kim
- Starring: Y.K. Kim
- Cinematography: Maximo Munzi
- Edited by: Maximo Munzi
- Music by: Jon McCallum
- Production company: P.J.K. Group
- Distributed by: Manson International
- Release date: August 26, 1988
- Running time: 84 minutes
- Country: United States
- Language: English
- Budget: $1 million

Miami Connection is a 1987 American independent martial arts film starring Y.K. Kim, who also wrote and produced the feature. Originally, the film was critically maligned and received a poor box office return upon release. It remained unseen for decades until Drafthouse Films restored the film for a proper release in 2012. The film was released on DVD, Blu-ray, limited-edition VHS, and various digital download options on December 11, 2012. Since then, the film has been better received by audiences and has garnered a cult following.

== Plot ==
A cocaine deal in Miami is interrupted by a group of motorcycle-riding ninjas led by Yashito, who steal the drugs and ride back to Orlando to party. At a club, Yashito's close associate, Jeff, sees his sister Jane onstage. She has become romantically involved with John, the bassist of the club's band, Dragon Sound, which consists of an ethnically diverse group of five college students who are best friends. They live, train Taekwondo, and attend the University of Central Florida all together; they are also all orphans. Jeff disapproves of his sister's relationship with John and confronts him at school, but Mark, rhythm guitarist of Dragon Sound, the band's Taekwondo instructor and father-figure to the other band members, stands up to him.

Another band confronts the owner of the club over his hiring of Dragon Sound but gets beaten up. The rival band leader brings a large group of rowdy guys to Dragon Sound directly and fights them in the street, but Dragon Sound defeats them with Taekwondo. Consequently, the rival band enlists the help of Jeff, who summons Dragon Sound to fight at a train depot, but he and his gang are badly defeated by Dragon Sound's superior martial arts skills. Jeff tries again by kidnapping Tom, the lead guitarist and singer of Dragon Sound. The remaining band members stage a rescue, wherein they free Tom and accidentally kill Jeff. Yashito is angered by Jeff's death and sets out for revenge.

Meanwhile, the keyboardist of the band, Jim, has revealed that he is searching for his long-lost father. He is initially nervous about revealing that he is not a true orphan like his friends, but they accept him anyways. He finally receives word that his father has been located, so the band pools their money to buy him a suit and then heads to the airport. Along the way, Yashito and his gang of ninjas surround Mark, Jim and John and chase them into a park, where they do battle. Jim is critically injured, but John and Mark manage to kill all of the ninjas, and Mark kills Yashito in single combat. At the hospital, Jim survives his wounds and reconnects with his repentant father.

== Cast ==
- Y.K. Kim as Mark, Korean rhythm guitarist of Dragon Sound, and Taekwondo instructor and father figure to the other band members
- Vincent Hirsch as John, Irish-American bass guitarist of Dragon Sound, and Jane's boyfriend
- William Ergle as Jeff, leader of a gang of hooligans which is closely associated with Yashito's gang of ninjas, and Jane's brother
- Siyung Jo as Yashito, leader of a gang of ninjas which is closely associated with Jeff's gang of hooligans
- Kathie Collier as Jane, guest vocalist of Dragon Sound, John's girlfriend, and Jeff's sister
- Joseph Diamond as Jack, Israeli-American drummer of Dragon Sound
- Maurice Smith as Jim, Korean/African-American keyboardist of Dragon Sound
- Angelo Janotti as Tom, Italian-American lead guitarist/vocalist of Dragon Sound

== Production ==
The film was made in 1987. Film director Richard Park (a.k.a. Park Woo-sang) saw Y.K. Kim on the Korean talk show Meet at 11 P.M. (11시에 만납시다) in 1985. Kim was promoting a book about taekwondo. Park met Kim and convinced him to make a film. Park conceived the story while watching Kim's interview. Early plans involved casting Bobby Kim (no relation to Y.K. Kim) as one of two brothers, with Y.K. Kim playing the other. The working title was TaeKwon-Do.

Kim borrowed from friends, took out loans, spent all of his savings, and mortgaged his taekwondo school to finance the film. He had never made a film before. Erin Sullivan of Orlando Weekly said that Kim "had no idea what he was doing". Kim said that he hoped to find a distributor so the film would play nationally, but hundreds of distribution companies and studios rejected the film, including all of the major film distributors and several independent film distributors. He later said, "Every distribution company rejected it after screening and said to me, 'Don't waste your time. Just throw it away; it is trash.'"

After the rejection, Kim continued work on the film by refilming and reworking portions. A small distribution company purchased the film for $100,000. Sullivan states that Kim planned to "make a movie that draws attention to 'exciting martial arts action (not computer-generated).'"

== Release ==
Re-release poster by Drafthouse Films.

The film opened in August 1988 in eight theaters in Greater Orlando and was also screened in Daytona Beach and Melbourne, Florida. The film also opened in West Germany. Kim said "I was so excited, and I had no doubt that we would pack every theater and it would be a blockbuster." Instead, Miami Connection had a poor critical reception and its run in theaters ended after three weeks. The Orlando Sentinel called it the worst film of 1988. The film had a cost of about $1 million and almost bankrupted Kim.

Rob Humanick of Slant Magazine commented that the film should have been featured on an episode of Mystery Science Theater 3000, and that it "would have likely been seen as a prize specimen and went [sic] for the jugular".

=== Re-release ===
As time passed, Miami Connection became an underground cult film. Y.K. Kim said that in a period of several years before 2012 several magazines and television talk shows requested interviews about Miami Connection, and that Kim ignored most of the requests.

In 2009, Zack Carlson, a programmer at the Alamo Drafthouse Cinema in Austin, Texas, found the film on eBay and made a winning blind bid of $50. Carlson screened the film in the theater in Austin, Texas and found a positive reception, so he gave the film to the creative director of Drafthouse Films, the distribution division of the Alamo Drafthouse Cinemas. The director, Evan Husney, called Kim, and asked to get permission to re-release the film. Originally Kim believed that his requests were jokes, so he terminated the calls multiple times. Kim said "I was wondering why they wanted to distribute this movie that the public had rejected and Hollywood treated like trash 25 years ago." Husney and Kim negotiated for several months before reaching a deal to re-release the film. In the summer of 2010 it was screened as part of the Alamo Drafthouse Weird Wednesdays. Rob Humanick of Slant Magazine said "The response was immense, almost transcendent, leading to encore presentations and ultimately a limited re-release."

The film received screenings in the New York Asian Film Festival and the Everything Is Festival, where it met with a positive reception. Erin Sullivan of the Orlando Weekly said "Drafthouse has helped connect this film to its audience with a series of midnight showings at film festivals and theaters in New York, Miami, Atlanta, Seattle and this week, Orlando."

== Reception and legacy ==
=== Initial release ===
During its original release, the film was ignored by the public. The Orlando Sentinel called it the worst film of 1988. Roger Hurlburt of the South Florida Sun Sentinel wrote, "for lack of a better synopsis, Miami Connection is a cocaine-war-rock-ninja-motorcycle-gang film, with aspirations of being an action-adventure musical," and that Y.K. Kim "simply cannot talk". The title of the review by Jay Boyar of the Orlando Sentinel was "If You Can't Say Something Nice".

=== Reassessments ===
The reception has been more favorable post-2009. The film's re-release was met with mostly positive reviews. On Rotten Tomatoes, the film has an approval rating of 65%, based on reviews from 20 critics. On Metacritic, it has a score of 56 out of 100, based on reviews from 4 critics, indicating "mixed or average reviews".

Erin Sullivan of the Orlando Weekly wrote that "the movie has been surprisingly well-received since its rerelease – or at least, received for what it is and not held up to unrealistic standards." Rob Humanick of Slant Magazine gave the film three and one-half stars out of four stars and wrote that "love it or hate it, it's doubtful you'll ever forget it, and it may just force you to redefine your definition of what constitutes 'good' cinema." Rich Juzwiak of Gawker wrote that the film was "So Bad It’s Essential." David Schmader of The Stranger wrote that "to say that Miami Connection is bad is a crushing understatement. Miami Connection is so bad it makes Tommy Wiseau's The Room look like Wild Strawberries" and that "but out of this tragic mess of failure and incompetence, a distinctly sweet spirit emerges. Its source is the cumulative gameness and good sportsmanship of everyone involved in Miami Connection, which is drenched in a goofy joy that is contagious." Jacquie Allen of Tucson Weekly said "Miami Connection is quite possibly the most hilariously terrible film made in the ’80s, which is no small feat...the film has gained a cult following over the years and with good reason: it is one of the best bad movies ever made."

Miami Connection was featured during an October 2015 Rifftrax Live event. Y.K. Kim, speaking with Paste, appreciated that the Rifftrax event brought the film to movie screens again, even if they would make fun of it, and planned to watch the event himself.

In 2017 the film was the subject of a live episode of the comedy podcast How Did This Get Made? that was later published on their website on September 15, 2017.

== In other media ==
Miami Connection is referenced in the music video to Pharrell Williams's No. 1 hit song "Happy" (2014), where the first dancer is seen sporting a Dragon Sound cutoff tee.

Far Cry 3: Blood Dragon, a 2013 video game, uses the film's song "Friends" during its end credits. Its cover art also appears to be inspired by Miami Connection.

"Against the Ninja" is briefly heard in the Ten Year Old Tom episode "Tae Kwon Do", causing the titular character to remark, "There's no such thing as Tae Kwon Do music."

== See also ==
- Samurai Cop - Rediscovered 1991 film similar in content
