= The ImaginAsian =

Movie theater in New York City

Coordinates: 40°45′39.64″N 73°57′53.97″W

The ImaginAsian was a 300 seat movie theater in Midtown Manhattan, New York City, dedicated to exclusively showcasing Asian films, music performances, and live events. It was located on 59th Street between 2nd and 3rd Avenues, and opened in 2005.

The ImaginAsian was owned by ImaginAsian Entertainment, which also operated ImaginAsian TV (a 24/7 cable network), ImaginAsian Radio, and iaLink, an online e-zine. In 2007 the company opened another theatre, the ImaginAsian Center in Los Angeles.

All films shown at The ImaginAsian were in their original language and subtitled for English-speaking audiences. The theatre was able to project English subtitles onto films that did not previously have an English subtitled release.

The ImaginAsian primarily showcased Asian films, including films from Japan, China, India, Thailand, Vietnam, Korea and the Philippines, as well as Asian American films from the United States. New box-office hits and independent films were shown alongside lesser-known classic titles. It also hosted several film festivals, including the New York Asian Film Festival and the New York Filipino Film Festival.

The ImaginAsian was housed in a completely renovated Clearview Cinemas location, which was formerly known as the DW Griffith Theater. The theatre was acquired by Phoenix Cinemas, until they closed the location in 2014.
