= Fish Story =

- Film poster
- Directed by: Yoshihiro Nakamura
- Written by: Kōtarō Isaka (novel); Tamio Hayashi (screenplay)
- Produced by: Yasushi Utagawa; Hitoshi Endo
- Starring: Vincent Giry; Gaku Hamada; Atsushi Itô; Kengo Kora; Mirai Moriyama; Mikako Tabe
- Cinematography: Takashi Komatsu
- Edited by: Hideaki Ohata
- Music by: Kazuyoshi Saito; Yukio Kikuchi
- Production companies: DUB; CJ Entertainment; Amuse Soft Entertainment
- Release date: March 20, 2009 (Japan)
- Running time: 112 minutes
- Country: Japan
- Language: Japanese

Fish Story (Japanese: フィッシュストーリー, Hepburn: Fisshu Sutōrī) is a 2009 Japanese action comedy film directed by Yoshihiro Nakamura with the screenplay adapted from the homonymous novel by Kōtarō Isaka.

== Plot ==
In 1975, an obscure rock band called Gekirin record a song called "Fish Story" that anticipates the sound of punk rock that is taking root in New York City and London. The band breaks up shortly after "Fish Story" is released due to record company interference, but the song has an ongoing life over the years. The film jumps between decades as the recording plays a role in several seemingly unrelated scenarios: a member of the hospitality staff on a ferry (Mirai Moriyama) wins the heart of a beautiful girl while battling hijackers; Masaru (Gaku Hamada) and his buddies look for women on a lonely and boring evening; a comet heads towards Earth while a strange man in a record store lectures those around him about the impending destruction of the Earth; and how Gekirin came to write the song.

== Cast ==
- Vincent Giry
- Gaku Hamada
- Atsushi Itô
- Kengo Kora
- Mirai Moriyama
- Mikako Tabe

== Release ==
Fish Story received its North American premiere at the 2009 New York Asian Film Festival and the H.R. Giger Award «Narcisse» for the Best Feature Film at the Neuchatel International Fantastic Film Festival (Switzerland). In her review for The Guardian, Catherine Shoard called the film "aggressively quirky" and warned of "a rather nasty rape scene".
