= Yoshihiro Nakamura =

Japanese film director and screenwriter

- 中村義洋
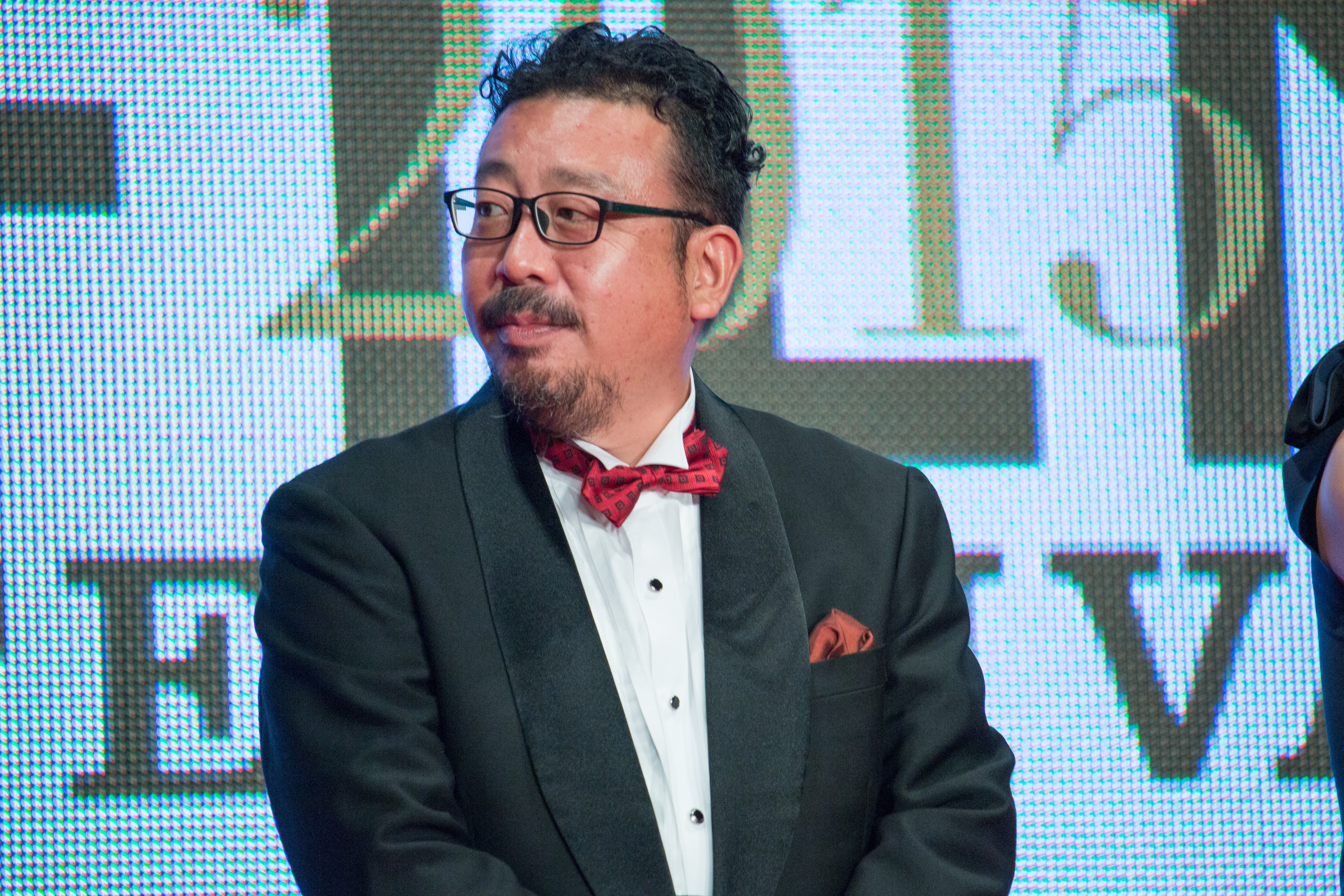
- Nakamura at Opening Ceremony of the 28th Tokyo International Film Festival
- Born: August 15, 1970 (age 56); Ibaraki Prefecture, Japan
- Occupations: Film director, screenwriter
- Notable work: Fish Story (2009); A Boy and His Samurai (2010)

Yoshihiro Nakamura (中村義洋, Nakamura Yoshihiro) is a Japanese film director and screenwriter, known for his 2009 film Fish Story, which premiered at the New York Asian Film Festival, and A Boy and His Samurai, which won the Audience Award at the 2011 New York Asian Film Festival.

== Life ==
He was born on 25 August 1970 in Ibaraki Prefecture, Japan. He went to Seijo University Department of Arts and Literature. While there he joined the Film Research Club and started 8 mm film making, and in 1993 won the PIA Film Festival Grand Prix with "Summer Rain Kitchen". After graduating he worked as assistant director on films with Yoichi Sai, Hideyuki Hirayama and Juzo Itami. In 1999 he made his debut as an independent director with "Local News". That year he worked to direct, organise and produce many films that Broadway Co. (ブロードウェイ) made into the "It's True! Cursed Films" series. In 2004 together with scriptwriter Ken'ichi Suzuki and editor Tooru Hosokawa he formed the conte unit "Assembly of Little Pigeons". In 2007 he won the Kaneto Shindō Prize given to the most promising new director by the Japan Film Makers' Association. In 2010 he worked as a narrator on the "It's True! Cursed Films" series.

== Filmography ==
=== Film ===
- Lizard Baby (2004)
- @Babymail (2005)
- Asoko no Seki (2005)
- The Booth (2005)
- Route 225 (2006)
- The Foreign Duck, the Native Duck and God in a Coin Locker (2007)
- The Glorious Team Batista (2008)
- The Triumphant Return of General Rouge (2009)
- Fish Story (2009)
- Golden Slumber (2010)
- A Boy and His Samurai (2010)
- Chips (2012)
- See you tomorrow, everyone (2013)
- Miracle Apples (Kiseki no ringo) (2013)
- The Snow White Murder Case (2014)
- Prophecy (2015)
- The Inerasable (2015)
- The Magnificent Nine (2016)
- Mumon: The Land of Stealth (2017)
- The 47 Ronin in Debt (2019)
- The Girl Who Sees (2025)

=== Television ===
- Dark Tales of Japan (2004) – Episode "Kumo Onna"

=== Anime series ===
- Dark Gathering (2023) (Narrator)
