= Yang Chia-yun =

Taiwanese film director

- Traditional Chinese: 楊家雲
- Simplified Chinese: 杨家云
Transcriptions

Yang Chia-yun (Karen Yang), born March 1947 and originally from Qingdao, Shandong Province, is one of the second generation directors in Taiwan. She is also regarded as a "pioneer female film director of commercial Taiwanese film during the 1970s and 1980s". In 1998, Yang Chia-yun directed the documentary A Secret Buries For 50 Years-- A Story of Taiwanese "Comfort Women", which won the 35th Golden Horse Awards for "Best documentary". "The fate and resistance of women are mostly the focus of Chia-yun Yang's movies", among which The Unsinkable Miss Calabash and A Secret Buried For 50 Years-- A Story of Taiwanese "Comfort Women" are the ones that she is personally most satisfied with.

== Biography ==
=== Early years ===
Yang Chia-yun's interest in and preference for movies had been cultivated since she was a child. At that time, her elder brother often liked to make use of existing simple props, such as curtains, table lamps, homemade paper puppets and so forth, to create a "family shadow play". Even if the props were simple and the techniques were not mature enough, this game was quite interesting for Yang Chia-yun at a young age. After graduating from high school, Yang Chia-yun went to the National Taiwan Art Academy (now the Taiwan Art University) to study in the department of movie and TV program. During that time, she experienced the work of a continuity clerk for the first time in the summer internship. Later, she was assigned by the Central Motion Picture Corporation (now the Central Pictures Corporation) to work as an intern in director Hsing Lee's movie Jade Goddess, during which time she was promoted by Yung-Tze Li, the continuity clerk of the movie, and became a formal continuity girl.
In the first nine years of Yang Chia-yun's career, she once served as a continuity clerk, an assistant director and a deputy director and acquired technical skills such as cutting, dubbing and so forth. She also followed and cooperated with senior directors Hsing Lee, Ching-Jui Pai and Yao-Chi Chen in the early period. Therefore, she had accumulated rich experience in practice. In the 1970s, Yang Chia-yun also worked as a writer and co-wrote the scripts of the movies such as The Three Tales, A Saturday Date, The Beauty with Two Faces and others.

=== After becoming a movie director ===
In 1978, after entering the movie industry for nine years, Yang became a director officially and directed her first film, an affectionate literary film Morning Mist, with Brigitte Lin and Chin Han playing the lead roles. Later, Yang and the female writer Hsuan Hsiao-fa together set up Sunshine Film Company and their first movie was a comedy, The Unsinkable Miss Calabash in 1981. In fact, they originally planned to produce another movie as the first one of the company. However, the comedy movies were popular at that time, so they changed their plan. Encouraged by the news agency of the executive council, The Unsinkable Miss Calabash was sent to show in the Edinburgh International Film Festival. This movie also got three nominations in the 18th Golden Horse Awards, best actress and best film original music, and Wang Lai, supporting actress of the movie, won the golden horse award of the best supporting actress. Yang Chia-yun also tried to direct the works of other subjects, such as a thriller Who Dare Challenge Me in 1981 and a horror movie Exposed to Danger in 1982. In 1998, Yang Chia-yun directed the documentary A Secret Buries For 50 Years-- A Story of Taiwanese "Comfort Women", which was in the shortlist of Japanese Yamagata International Documentary Film Festival, and won the 35th golden horse award for "Best documentary". After directing A Secret Buried For 50 Years-- A Story of Taiwanese "Comfort Women", "Yang Chia-yun stopped directing drama movies and made only advertisements, social education films and public welfare films".

=== Other works ===
In addition to making films, Yang Chia-yun also participated in the direct of television series for China Television Company, Ltd. (CTV), and Chinese Television Service (CTS, now the Chinese Television System Enterprise), such as Mo Ran Hui Shou (in 1984), Mo Gui Shu (in 1985), Sunny Rain (in 1990), Jin Se Shi Guang (in 1991), Jin Qian Shu. Moreover, she also participated in making a TV program: Yin fa shou nian : Sun Yue he ta de lao peng you men. "The same team worked for A Secret Buries For 50 Years-- A Story of Taiwanese "Comfort Women" parptcipated in making this program, including director Yang Chia-yun, producer Nianci Wang, photography Ruiyuan Shen, and WorldCat Identities". What's more, Yang Chia-yun worked for Hsing Lee's stage play Xia Xue.

== Filmography ==
=== Movies ===
Title	Year	Genres	Starring
Morning Mist	1978	Romance	Brigitte Lin Ching Hsia, Han Chin
Love Comes from the Sea	1980	Drama	Kenny Bee, Tsai-Ling Ying
The Unsinkable Miss Calabash	1981	Comedy/Romance	Tsai-Ling Ying, Sibelle Hu
Who Dare Challenge Me	1981	Drama	Hui-Shan Yang, Hao-Jen Chiang
The Lady Avenger	1981	Action/Crime/Drama	Hsiao-Fen Lu, Shou-Ping Tsui
Exposed to Danger	1982	Crime/Horror	Hsiao-Fen Lu, Wing-Lun Tam
The Wayward Angels	1982	Drama	Fu-Mei Chang, Ping Chang
The Crazy Youth	1982	Drama	Hsiao-Fen Lu, Kai-Li Chu (Niu Tien)
Women Warriors of Kingmen	1983	Adventure	Hsiao-Fen Lu, Hsiu-Shen Liang
A Secret Buries For 50 Years—A Story of Taiwanese "Comfort Women"	1998	Documentary	A-Tao Huang, Man-Mei Lu

=== Television series ===
Title	Year	TV Station	Starring
Mo Ran Hui Shou	1984	China Television Company, Ltd	Yi-Chan Lu, Lily Li, Pi-Ling Lo, Ailun Chiang
Mo Gui Shu	1985	Chinese Television Service	Stephen Tung, Ruo-yu Liu
Sunny Rain	1990	China Television Company, Ltd	Yi-Chen Lin, Morni Chang
Jin Se Shi Guang	1991	China Television Company, Ltd	Han Yu, Yu-Lan Chin
Jin Qian Shu	Unknown	Unknown	Unknown

=== Scripts ===
Title	Year	Genre	Director	Starring
The Three Tales	1974	Drama	Hsing Lee, Chia Li, Ching-Jui Pai	Ping-Yu Chang, Ya-Hui Huang, Chun Hsiung Ko
A Saturday Date	1976	Comedy/Romance	Yung-Tze Li	Charlie Chin, Feng Hsu, Kai-Li Chu (Niu Tien), Wen-Ching Liu
The Beauty with Two Faces	1976	Romance	Yung-Tze Li	Alan Tang, Brigitte Lin, Wei Chang
Love, Diploma & Jeans	1976	Romance	Wei-Bin Liu	Feng-Jiao Lin, Wen-Ching Liu, Kai-Li Chu (Niu Tien)
First Kiss First Good-bye	1978	Romance	Yao-Chi Chen	Wen-Ching Liu, Yin-Chen Chang, Ya-Lei Kuei

=== Others ===
Title	Year	Genre
Yin fa shou nian : Sun Yue he ta de lao peng you men	2007	TV program
Xia Xue	2010	Stage Play
