= Late Bloomer (2004 film) =

Osoi Hito (Late Bloomer)
- Directed by: Go Shibata
- Written by: Gô Shibata
- Produced by: Toshiki Shima
- Starring: Ariko Arita
- Cinematography: Masaaki Takakura
- Edited by: Keita Ichikawa; Keisuke Suzuki
- Music by: Takashi Ueno
- Release date: November 21, 2004
- Running time: 83 minutes
- Country: Japan
- Language: Japanese

Late Bloomer (Japanese: Osoi Hito) is a 2004 Japanese film directed by Go Shibata, about a handicapped serial killer named Sumida.

== Plot ==
Sumida is disabled with cerebral palsy, but all he wants is to hang out with his friends and enjoy beer, rock and roll, and women. When his best friend steals his secret love, he embarks upon a cold-blooded rampage of revenge.
