= Y.K. Kim =

Korean taekwondo practitioner

- Born: Young-kun Kim; 29 November 1946 (age 79)
- Style: Taekwondo

Young-kun Kim (김영군, born November 29, 1946), known as Y.K. Kim, is a Korean-born taekwondo martial artist who resides in Florida. Kim was the producer and main actor of the film Miami Connection. He also publishes Martial Arts World Magazine, a quarterly magazine for professionals in the martial arts, and wrote the book Winning Is a Choice.

== Early life ==
Kim received a taekwondo black belt at age 13, making him among the youngest in Korea to do so. At first, he studied and taught in Korea, and in 1976 he moved to Buenos Aires, Argentina, and taught there. In 1977, he moved to New York City, and to Orlando, Florida a year later, where he opened Y.K. Kim's TaeKwon-Do, his first taekwondo school. The school became the Martial Arts World, a franchise that Erin Sullivan of the Orlando Weekly described as "the McDonald's of martial arts schools" in Central Florida. The school was originally on Robinson Street, then on Mills Avenue, then its current location on Colonial Drive. As of 1988, Kim only claimed ownership of the East Colonial Drive school. As of then, the other schools are part of the American TaeKwon-Do Federation, which Kim founded. The federation establishes the philosophies and rules used by the schools within the federation.

== Career ==
In the mid-1980s, Korean film director Richard Park met Kim after seeing Kim interviewed on the Korean talk show Meet at 11 p.m. (11시에 만납시다) and the two agreed to produce a film, Miami Connection. Originally, the film had a very limited release with no significant attention. The film's production almost bankrupted Kim. In the meantime, he established his business and became a motivational speaker. In 2012, the Alamo Drafthouse Cinema redistributed Miami Connection, leading to a positive reception and subsequent cult following.

== Other ventures ==
In 2002, Kim and Choung Byoung-gug, a legislator in Korea, proposed a Korea pavilion at Epcot.
