= A Boy and His Samurai =

- Film poster
- Directed by: Yoshihiro Nakamura
- Screenplay by: Yoshihiro Nakamura
- Based on: Fushigi no Kuni no Yasubei by Gen Araki
- Produced by: Taro Nagamatsuya; Yasushi Utagawa
- Starring: Ryo Nishikido; Rie Tomosaka; Fuku Suzuki; Hiroki Konno; Keisuke Horibe; Hitomi Satō; Shiori Kutsuna; Yūji Nakamura; Jun Inoue
- Cinematography: Gen Kobayashi
- Edited by: Hiroaki Morishita
- Music by: Goro Yasukawa
- Release date: July 31, 2010 (Japan)
- Running time: 108 minutes
- Country: Japan
- Language: Japanese
- Box office: $1,763,791

A Boy and His Samurai (Japanese: ちょんまげぷりん, Hepburn: Chonmage Purin; lit. "Chonmage Pudding") is a 2010 Japanese time travel comedy film, directed by Yoshihiro Nakamura.

== Plot ==
Based on a manga by Gen Araki, the film chronicles the adventures of a samurai who accidentally travels through time from Edo-era Japan to present-day Japan where he meets a single working mother and her young son.

== Cast ==
- Ryo Nishikido - Kijima Yasube
- Rie Tomosaka - Hiroko Yusa
- Fuku Suzuki - Tomoya Yusa
- Jun Inoue - Tonoma Tomoharu (teacher)
- Keisuke Horibe - Shirozaki
- Hiroki Konno - Tanaka
- Hitomi Satō - Yoshie Hiraishi
- Yūji Nakamura - TV presenter
- Shiori Kutsuna
