= Let's Make the Teacher Have a Miscarriage Club =

- Promotional release poster
- Directed by: Eisuke Naitō
- Written by: Eisuke Naitō
- Produced by: Eisuke Naitō
- Cinematography: Kōsuke Shishihara
- Edited by: Keisuke Tominaga
- Music by: Hisashi Arita
- Release date: April 30, 2011 (Nippon Connection Film Festival)
- Running time: 62 minutes
- Country: Japan
- Language: Japanese

Let's Make the Teacher Have a Miscarriage Club (先生を流産させる会, Sensei o Ryūzan Saseru Kai) is a 2011 Japanese thriller film directed by Eisuke Naitō in his directorial debut. The film follows a group of five junior high school girls led by a psychopath who decide to make their teacher have a miscarriage after hearing the news of her pregnancy.
