= Go Shibata =

Japanese film director (born 1975)

Go Shibata (柴田 剛, Shibata Gō; born 8 May 1975) is an independent Japanese film director.

== Career ==
Born in Kanagawa Prefecture, he studied filmmaking at the Osaka University of Arts. His graduation film, NN-891102 (1999) screened at foreign film festivals and was released in theaters in Japan. His Late Bloomer won the Cause and F(X) Dream Digital Award at the Hawaii International Film Festival in 2005.

== Filmography ==
- All You Can Eat
- NN-891102 (1999)
- Late Bloomer aka Osoi Hito (2004)
- Doman Seman (2009)
