= P (film) =

- Directed by: Paul Spurrier
- Written by: Translation; Preeyaporn Chareonbutra; Screenplay; Paul Spurrier; Story; Paul Spurrier
- Produced by: Panupong Dangdej Aka Piyawat Dangdej 'October'; Cholkris Voraratchaikul
- Starring: Suangporn Jaturaphut; John Kathrein; Shaun Delaney; Amy Siria
- Narrated by: Puvisate Ltd.
- Cinematography: Richie Moore, and Paul Spurrier
- Edited by: Paul Spurrier
- Music by: Paul Spurrier
- Distributed by: Creative Films Siam Ltd.
- Release date: 28 February 2005 (Fantasporto International Film Festival)
- Running time: 110 minutes
- Countries: Thailand; United Kingdom
- Language: Thai
- Budget: US$2000$

P is a 2005 Thai-language horror feature film directed by Paul Spurrier. It has been claimed to be the “first Thai film to be directed by a westerner”.

== Plot ==
Whilst growing up in rural Thailand, a young orphan girl named Dau (Suangporn Jaturaphut) is taught the ways of magic by her grandmother. But when the grandmother falls sick, Dau is lured to Bangkok to find work so that she can buy medicine. She finds herself working in a go-go bar, and her journey from naiveté to maturity is swift. She uses the magical skills her grandmother taught her to her advantage, but in doing so makes enemies within the bar. As her magic gets darker, and the consequences increasingly horrific, she gradually loses control, and something evil takes over.

== Cast ==
- Suangporn Jaturaphut as Dau/Aaw
- Shaun Delaney as Rich Customer
- John Kathrein as Customer
- Chartchai Kongsiri as Policeman
- Opal as Pookie
- Pisamai Pakdeevijit as Grandmother
- Supatra Roongsawang as New
- Narisara Sairatanee as May
- Amy Siriya as Mee
