= Paul Spurrier =

English actor

Paul Spurrier (born 23 May 1967 Suffolk) is a British former child actor on stage, television, and film, and a screenwriter and film director. He appeared in more than thirty different roles, with credits including Anna Karenina and The Lost Boys for the BBC, Tales of the Unexpected for Anglia Television, and the feature film The Wild Geese as Richard Harris's son Emile.

== Early life ==
Spurrier was educated at Briar Clyffe School in Lowestoft, and Norwich School, followed by the University of Southern California and the London International Film School.

== Selected filmography ==
- The Wild Geese (1978)
- The Devil's Crown (1978)
- Lady Oscar (1979)
- Der schwarze Bumerang (1982, TV miniseries)
- Max Headroom: 20 Minutes into the Future (1985)
- King of the Wind (1989)
- Underground (1998)
- P (2005)
- The Forest (2016)
- Eullenia (2018, Series)
- The Maestro (2021)
- Influencer (2022)
- Inhuman Kiss: The Last Breath (2023)

== Awards ==
- The Maestro - Casablanca Film Factory Awards - Best Feature Film (2022)
