= Lam Ching-ying filmography =

Lam Ching-Ying (Chinese: 林正英; birth name: Lam Gun-bo 林根寶; 27 December 1952 – 8 November 1997) was a Hong Kong stuntman, actor, film producer, action director and director. Upon his death in 1997 Lam had featured in over 132 films with multiple credits as a director and producer. With a career spanning 3 decades his most notable works include The Prodigal Son, The Big Boss and the Mr Vampire film series.

== Filmography ==
=== Film ===
| Year | Title | Role | Actor | Notes |
|---|---|---|---|---|
| 1969 | The Whirlwind Knight | | Yes | |
| 1970 | The Golden Knight | Shaolin Monk at temple | Yes | |
| 1970 | Brothers Five | Minor Role | Yes | |
| 1970 | Wrath of the Sword | Minor Role | Yes | |
| 1971 | The Invincible Eight | Whip-wielding henchman | Yes | |
| 1971 | Six Assassins | Lord Li's soldier | Yes | |
| 1971 | The Blade Spares None | Prince's fighter | Yes | |
| 1971 | The Golden Seal | Thug | Yes | |
| 1971 | The Crimson Charm | Crimson Charm thug | Yes | |
| 1971 | Lady with a Sword | Minor Role | Yes | |
| 1971 | The Big Boss | Ah Yen | Yes | |
| 1971 | A Touch of Zen | East Chamber guard | Yes | |
| 1971 | The Long Chase | Minor Role | Yes | |
| 1971 | The Lady Hermit | Horse thief | Yes | |
| 1971 | The Angry River | Minor Role | Yes | |
| 1972 | Fist of Fury | Susuki's student | Yes | |
| 1972 | The Casino | Casino thug | Yes | |
| 1972 | The Way of the Dragon | Thug | Yes | Uncredited |
| 1972 | The Deadly Knives | Japanese | Yes | |
| 1972 | Hapkido | Black Bear student | Yes | Uncredited |
| 1972 | The Imperial Swordsman | Bandit | Yes | |
| 1972 | The Thunderbolt Fist | Japanese fighter on stage | Yes | |
| 1972 | The Fugitive | Ma's thug | Yes | |
| 1972 | Treasure Castle | | Yes | |
| 1973 | A Man Called Tiger | Blue Shirt thug | Yes | |
| 1973 | Iron Bull | Thug | Yes | |
| 1973 | Seaman No 7 | Golden Hair's thug | Yes | |
| 1973 | None But the Brave | Masked patriot | Yes | |
| 1973 | The Rendezvous of Warriors | Minor Role | Yes | |
| 1973 | Enter the Dragon | Guard / Chief double for Sek Kin | Yes | Uncredited |
| 1973 | Tiger | Japanese | Yes | |
| 1973 | Bruce Lee, the Man and the Legend | Himself | Yes | |
| 1973 | Back Alley Princess | Rascal | Yes | |
| 1973 | When Taekwondo Strikes | Japanese | Yes | |
| 1974 | The Skyhawk | Woodland attacker | Yes | Uncredited |
| 1974 | Chinatown Capers | Gangster | Yes | |
| 1974 | Dynamite Brothers | Thug in white | Yes | |
| 1974 | Yellow Faced Tiger | Slaughter's man | Yes | |
| 1974 | Tornado of Pearl River | Minor Role | Yes | |
| 1974 | Bloody Ring | | Yes | |
| 1974 | The Sharp Fists in Kung Fu | | | |
| 1975 | The Man from Hong Kong | Minor Role | Yes | Uncredited |
| 1975 | The Spiritual Boxer | Ruei's thug | Yes | |
| 1976 | Hot Potato | Leopard Man | | Uncredited |
| 1976 | Challenge of the Masters | Master Pang's student | Yes | |
| 1976 | Bruce's Deadly Fingers | Brown Shirt Fighter | Yes | |
| 1976 | End of the Wicked Tigers | Villager | Yes | |
| 1977 | Executioners from Shaolin | Pai Mei's monk | Yes | Uncredited |
| 1977 | The Shaolin Plot | Soldier | Yes | |
| 1977 | The Pilferer's Progress | Hitman | Yes | |
| 1977 | Judgement of an Assassin | Bai Du Clan member | Yes | |
| 1977 | The Iron Fisted Monk | | Yes | Brief cameo |
| 1977 | The Sentimental Swordsman | Yun's man | Yes | |
| 1977 | The Amsterdam Kill | Police Officer | Yes | |
| 1977 | Broken Oath | One of Qi's men | Yes | |
| 1977 | Money Crazy | | Yes | |
| 1977 | He Has Nothing But Kung Fu | | Yes | |
| 1978 | Clan of Amazons | Red Shoe Society's man | Yes | |
| 1978 | The Game of Death | Macau fighter | Yes | Uncredited |
| 1978 | The Proud Youth | Minor Role | Yes | |
| 1978 | Amsterdam Connection | Mr Hung's henchman | Yes | |
| 1978 | Kung Fu Stars | | Yes | |
| 1978 | Enter the Fat Dragon | Fighter on movie set | Yes | |
| 1978 | Legend of the Bat | Han's sword troop | Yes | |
| 1978 | Warriors Two | Thunder's men / Leung's student | Yes | |
| 1978 | Dirty Tiger, Crazy Frog! | One of Panther's men | Yes | |
| 1978 | Kung Fu Means Fists, Strikes and Swords | Thug | Yes | |
| 1978 | Gee and Gor | | Yes | |
| 1979 | The Incredible Kung Fu Master | Fu student | Yes | |
| 1979 | Knockabout | Casino fighter | Yes | |
| 1979 | Odd Couple | Ha (Scarface's fighter) | Yes | |
| 1979 | His Name Is Nobody | Wears black wig | Yes | |
| 1979 | The Magnificent Butcher | Fan Man | Yes | |
| 1979 | Dragon Fist | | Yes | |
| 1979 | Crazy Partner | | | |
| 1980 | The Victim | Jo Wing's man / double | Yes | |
| 1980 | From Riches to Rags | Knife killer | Yes | |
| 1980 | By Hook or by Crook | Skinny's hired thug leader | Yes | |
| 1980 | Two Toothless Tigers | | Yes | |
| 1980 | Encounter of the Spooky Kind | Inspector | Yes | |
| 1980 | The Killer in White | | | |
| 1981 | The Prodigal Son | Leung Yee-tai | Yes | |
| 1982 | The Dead and the Deadly | Uncle Yee | Yes | |
| 1982 | Carry On Pickpocket | | | |
| 1983 | Winners and Sinners | Chan | Yes | |
| 1984 | Hocus Pocus | Master Sheng | Yes | |
| 1984 | Pom Pom | Police Sgt | Yes | Cameo |
| 1984 | The Return of Pom Pom | Flying Spider Lo Chien | Yes | |
| 1984 | Hong Kong 1941 | | | |
| 1984 | The Owl vs Bombo | | | |
| 1984 | Heroes Shed No Tears | Vietnamese Colonel | Yes | |
| 1985 | My Lucky Stars | Corrupted HK policeman | Yes | |
| 1985 | Those Merry Souls | Tak's father | Yes | |
| 1985 | Heart of Dragon | SWAT Commander | Yes | |
| 1985 | Mr. Vampire | Uncle Ko / Master Kau | Yes | |
| 1985 | Twinkle Twinkle Lucky Stars | | | |
| 1986 | The Millionaires' Express | Bank robber | Yes | |
| 1986 | Where's Officer Tuba? | Taoist priest | Yes | Cameo |
| 1986 | Mr. Vampire II | Lam Ching-ying / Lin Cheng-ying | Yes | |
| 1986 | Rosa | | | |
| 1987 | Eastern Condors | Lieutenant Lam | Yes | |
| 1987 | Lai Shi, China's Last Eunuch | Liu Chang-Fu | Yes | |
| 1987 | Cold-blooded Man (Naenghyeolja) | Chiang Fu | Yes | |
| 1987 | Mr. Vampire III | Uncle Nine | Yes | |
| 1988 | Paper Marriage | | | |
| 1988 | Shy Spirit | Taoist Priest | Yes | |
| 1988 | I Love Maria | Master | Yes | (Guest star) |
| 1988 | School on Fire | Hoi | Yes | |
| 1988 | Painted Faces | Wah | Yes | |
| 1988 | Her Vengeance | Hung | Yes | |
| 1989 | Pedicab Driver | Uncle Sheng | Yes | Cameo |
| 1989 | Vampire vs Vampire | One Eyebrow Priest | Yes | |
| 1989 | Armageddon | | | |
| 1990 | The Swordsman | Elder Kuk | Yes | |
| 1990 | Stage Door Johnny | Liu | Yes | |
| 1990 | Goodbye Hero | Frank | Yes | |
| 1990 | Magic Cop | Uncle Feng | Yes | |
| 1990 | Prince of the Sun | Khenlun | Yes | |
| 1990 | Encounter of the Spooky Kind II | Master Jiao | Yes | |
| 1991 | Spiritual Trinity | Tien Lung | Yes | |
| 1991 | The Ultimate Vampire | Master Chiu | Yes | |
| 1991 | An Eternal Combat | The Master | Yes | |
| 1991 | Red and Black | Lin Chiang | Yes | |
| 1991 | Gambling Ghost | Exorcist | Yes | |
| 1991 | Money Maker | Master Chu | Yes | |
| 1991 | Crazy Safari | Master HiSing | Yes | |
| 1991 | The Tantana | Mud Yuet | Yes | |
| 1991 | Slickers vs Killers | Owl | Yes | |
| 1991 | Shy Spirit | | Yes | |
| 1991 | Midnight Conjure | Taoist | Yes | Cameo |
| 1992 | Wizard's Curse | Taoist priest | Yes | |
| 1992 | Mr. Vampire 1992 | Master Lam Ching Ying | Yes | |
| 1992 | The Musical Vampire | Uncle Master | Yes | |
| 1992 | Skin Striperess | Taoist Lam | Yes | |
| 1992 | Pom Pom and Hot Hot | Lam Ho-Yang | Yes | |
| 1992 | Painted Skin | Purple monk | Yes | Cameo |
| 1992 | Mad Mad Ghost | Uncle Ying | Yes | |
| 1992 | Martial Arts Master Wong Fei Hung | Jiubinku Kyoto | Yes | |
| 1992 | Banana Spirit | Master Chen Sheng | Yes | |
| 1992 | Legend of Wong Tai Sin | Wong Cho Pin [title char] | Yes | |
| 1992 | China Dolls | Motorcycle policeman | Yes | |
| 1992 | Lover's Tear | Cheng Ying | Yes | |
| 1992 | Forced Nightmare | | Yes | |
| 1993 | The East Is Red | Zither player | Yes | [footage from 'Swordsman'] |
| 1993 | Rape in Public Sea | Nan | Yes | |
| 1993 | Exorcist Master | Uncle Nine | Yes | |
| 1994 | The Green Hornet | Uncle | Yes | |
| 1994 | The Chinese Ghostbuster | | Yes | |
| 1994 | Kung Fu Kid | | Yes | |

=== Television ===
| Year | Title | Role | Notes |
|---|---|---|---|
| 1995-1996 | Vampire Expert | Taoist Priest Mo Siu Fong | 80 episodes |
| 1996- 997 | Coincidentally | Priest | |
| 1997 | A Monk at Thirty | | 30 episodes |

== See also ==
- Cinema of Hong Kong
- Lists of Hong Kong films
