= Chinese horror film =

Films of the horror genre from Chinese-speaking areas

Chinese horror include films from China and Hong Kong that are part of the stream of Asian horror films. Like Korean, Taiwanese and Japanese horror as well as other Asian horror films, many focus on ghosts (yurei is also very common), supernatural environments, and suffering. Perhaps one of the best films for C-horror is The Eye directed by the Pang brothers which was later remade.

There is also some comedy elements such as Bio Zombie, Troublesome Night film series, The Vampire Who Admires Me, and My Left Eye Sees Ghosts.

== Jiangshi ==
Jiangshi fiction, revolving around the hopping vampire or zombie, is a subgenre of Chinese horror. A staple genre of Hong Kong cinema, jiangshi films blend horror with elements of comedy.

== Notable films ==
- Song at Midnight (1937)
- Nie Xiaoqian based on Strange Tales from a Chinese Studio by Pu Songling
  - The Enchanting Shadow (1960)
  - A Chinese Ghost Story I (1987)
  - A Chinese Ghost Story II (1990)
  - A Chinese Ghost Story III (1991)
  - A Chinese Ghost Story (2011)
- The Mr. Vampire Series
  - The Mr. Vampire Series by Ricky Lau films
    - Mr. Vampire I (1985)
    - Mr. Vampire II (1986)
    - Mr. Vampire III (1987)
    - Mr. Vampire IV (1988)
    - Mr. Vampire 1992 (1992)
  - The Mr. Vampire Series by Other directors
    - New Mr. Vampire (1987) by Billy Chan
    - Vampire vs Vampire (1989) by Lam Ching-ying
    - Magic Cop or (Mr. Vampire 5) (1990) by Stephen Tung
    - The Ultimate Vampire (1991) by Andrew Lau
    - The Musical Vampire (1992) by Wilson Tong
    - Exorcist Master (1992) by Wu Ma
    - The Era of Vampires (2002) by Wellson Chin
    - Rigor Mortis (2013) by Juno Mak
    - Vampire Cleanup Department (2017) by Chiu Sin-hang & Yan Pak-wing
- The Seventh Curse (1986)
- Black Sun: 731
  - Men Behind the Sun (1988)
  - Unit 731: Laboratory of the Devil (1992)
  - Narrow Escape (1994)
  - Black Sun: The Nanking Massacre (1995)
- Painted Skin based on Strange Tales from a Chinese Studio by Pu Songling
  - Painted Skin (1992)
  - Painted Skin (2008)
  - Painted Skin: The Resurrection (2012)
- Horror Hotline... Big Head Monster (2001)
- Double Vision (2002)
- The Eye or Seeing Ghosts (Gin gwai)by the Pang brothers
  - The Eye 1 (2002)
  - The Eye 2 (2004)
  - The Eye 3 (2005)
  - The Child's Eye (2010)
- Inner Senses (2002)
- New Blood (2002)
- Three (2002)
- The Death Curse (2003)
- Ab-normal Beauty/Leave Me Alone by the Pang brothers
  - Ab-normal Beauty or"Photos of Death" (also Sei mong se jun) (2004)
  - Leave Me Alone or"Ah, double in trouble" (also Ah ma yau nan) (2004)
- Bunshinsaba based on Bunshinsaba (2004)
  - Bunshinsaba I (2012)
  - Bunshinsaba 2 (2013)
  - Bunshinsaba 3 (2014)
- Home Sweet Home (2005)
- Re-cycle or(Gwai wik) (2006)by the Pang brothers
- Forest of Death (2007)by the Pang brothers
- The Matrimony (2007)
- Dead Air (2008)
- Curse of the Deserted (2010)
- Midnight Beating (2010)
- Mysterious Island
  - Mysterious Island 1 (2011)
  - Mysterious Island 2 (2013)
- Nightmare (2011)
- Blood Stained Shoes (2012)
- Fairy Tale Killer (2012)by the Pang brothers
- Haunting Love (2012)
- Nightclub School Hospital or(Any Other Side) (2012)
- Terror Hotel (2012)
- The Chrysalis (2013)
- Lift to Hell (2013)
- Midnight Microblog (2013)
- The Supernatural Events on Campus (2013)
- Bugs (2014)
- Jing Cheng 81 Hao based on Chaonei No. 81
  - The House That Never Dies (2014)
  - The House That Never Dies II (2017)
- The Boy (2016)
- Over Your Dead Body (2014)
- Admission by Guts (2015)
- Massagist (2015)
- The Mirror (2015)by the Pang brothers
- Mojin: The Lost Legend (2015)based on the novel Ghost Blows Out the Light
- The Strange House (2015)by the Pang brothers
- Murder at Honeymoon Hotel (2016)
- Phantom of the Theatre (2016)
- The Precipice Game (2016)
- Mon Mon Mon Monsters (2017)
- Guardians of the Tomb (2018)
- Detention (2019) based on Detention by Red Candle Games
- The Bridge Curse (2020)
- The Sadness (2021)
- Incantation (2022)
- Dead Talents Society (2024)
