= Jiangshi fiction =

Literary and cinematic genre of horror

Jiangshi fiction, or goeng-si fiction in Cantonese, is a literary and cinematic genre of horror based on the jiangshi of Chinese folklore, a reanimated corpse controlled by Taoist priests that resembles the zombies and vampires of Western fiction. The genre first appeared in the literature of the Qing dynasty and the jiangshi film (traditional Chinese: 殭屍片; simplified Chinese: 僵尸片; pinyin: Jiāngshīpiàn) is a staple of the modern Hong Kong film industry. Hong Kong jiangshi films like Mr. Vampire and Encounters of the Spooky Kind follow a formula of mixing horror with comedy and kung fu.

== Literature ==
Derived from Chinese folklore, jiangshi fiction first appeared in the literature of the Qing dynasty. The jiangshi is a corpse reanimated by a Taoist priest. The priest commands the jiangshi and directs it to a location for a proper burial. Jiangshi hop as they move and are able to absorb qi, the essence of the living. The ties between jiangshi and vampires, and the English translation of jiangshi as "hopping vampire", may have been a marketing ploy manufactured by Hong Kong studios eager to enter Western markets. Unlike vampires, jiangshi do not drink blood or desire immortality.

Fictional accounts of jiangshi were included in Qing collections of ghost stories and other supernatural tales. They are featured in the story A Corpse's Transmutation (Shibian) in the Shuyiji collection, A Vampiric Demon (Jiangshi gui) and Spraying Water (Penshui) in Pu Songling's Strange Stories from a Chinese Studio, and The Demonic Corpse (Jiangshi gui) in Dongxuan Zhuren's Shiyiji. In Spraying Water, the animated corpse spews a liquid that kills the wife of a government official and her two servants. A traveler is chased by a jiangshi in A Corpse's Transmutation, which killed three of his companions. There are thirty stories of jiangshi in Zi Bu Yu, written by Yuan Mei. Qing writer Ji Xiaolan provides a detailed description of jiangshi folklore in his book Yuewei Caotang Biji (The Shadow Book of Ji Yun, Empress Wu Books, 2021).

In contemporary literature, jiangshi mythology continues to inspire modern reinterpretations. The upcoming fantasy novel A Curse Carved in Ink by Tzeyi Koay integrates the folklore into a dark fantasy setting. The story follows an antiquarian bookseller who becomes possessed by the "jiangshi's claw," a demonic force that compels its host to drain life and energy from the world around them, reflecting the traditional motif of the jiangshi consuming vital essence (qi). To break the curse, the protagonist must travel to Diyu and undertake a series of trials inspired by the Five Poisons, a motif rooted in Chinese folk religion.

== Hong Kong cinema ==
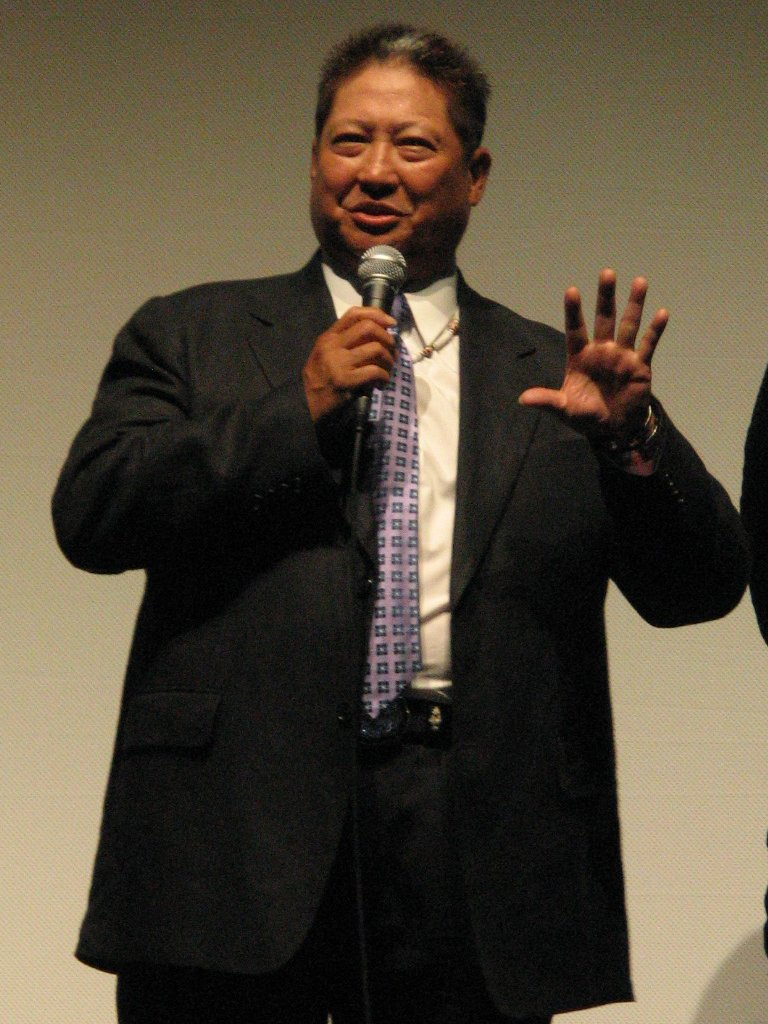
Sammo Hung directed Encounters of the Spooky Kind and produced Mr. Vampire.

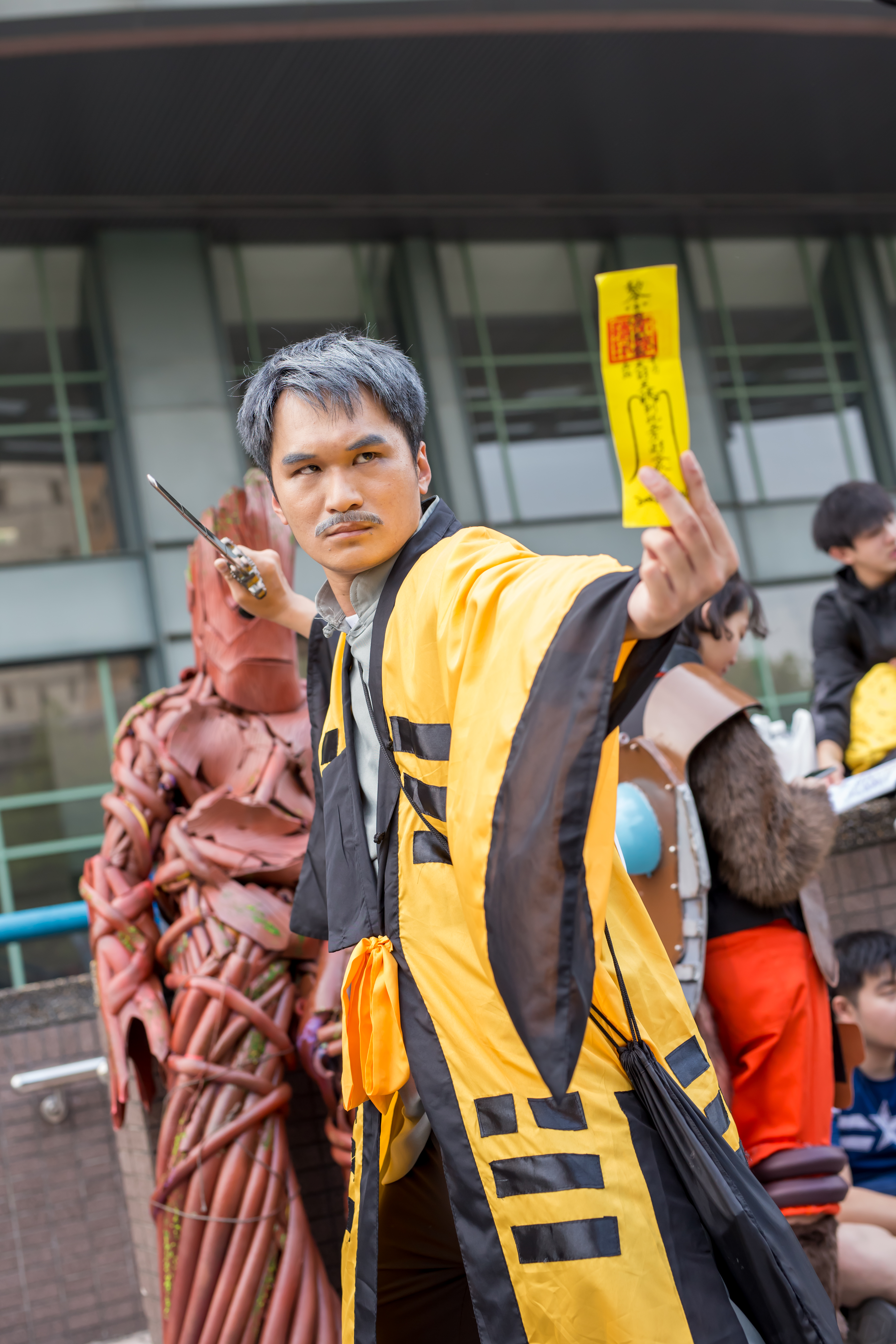
2021 cosplay of Lam Ching-ying's iconic Taoist priest "Uncle Kau" (九叔), who served as the heroic protagonist in many jiangshi films.

A number of monster films were produced before the jiangshi boom of the 1980s and the 1990s. The earliest concerning vampire is Midnight Vampire (午夜殭屍) directed in 1936 by Yeung Kung-Leung. Vampire films were also made in the 1970s, which merged the vampires of Western horror with the martial arts of Hong Kong kung fu films. The jiangshi films of the 1980s were a departure from the Dracula-like vampires of its predecessors. Cinematic portrayals of jiangshi show the corpses wearing traditional changshan garments with a talisman placed on its head that allows the Taoist priest to control the cadaver. The clichés imported from Western horror were fewer, but still visibly present. The cloak, a motif from Hollywood's adaptations of Dracula, appears in the jiangshi films Vampire vs Vampire and A Bite of Love.

The 1980 film Encounters of the Spooky Kind, directed by Sammo Hung, popularized the production of films based on the jiangshi of Chinese legends in the Hong Kong film industry, though it was not the first. As Andrew Heskens of easternkicks.com wrote, "Sammo Hung [...] took the idea of hopping vampires/deceased from The Shadow Boxing (a.k.a. The Spiritual Boxer II) and turned it into a phenomenon with Encounter of the Spooky Kind, and things were never the same." Encounters of the Spooky Kind is an early example of kung fu horror comedy in Hong Kong, and the jiangshi of the film are played by martial artists. A sequel, Encounters of the Spooky Kind II, was directed by Ricky Lau in 1990.

The 1985 film Mr. Vampire, directed by Ricky Lau, was the breakthrough success of the genre. The film established many of the genre's recognizable clichés. The protagonist is a Taoist priest, skilled in casting magical spells and performing kung fu, who uses supernatural powers to control the undead. He is assisted by incompetent sidekicks, whose antics are a source of comic relief, and must face a vengeful ghost.

In later jiangshi films, jiangshi interact and exist alongside Western vampires. In the 1989 film Vampire vs. Vampire, a Taoist priest and childlike jiangshi encounter a British vampire. The jiangshi saves the priest when his spells for taming the jiangshi are fruitless against the vampire. The cliché of jiangshi children, an allusion to a similar character in Mr. Vampire II, shows an awareness in jiangshi films of the genre by referencing its past cliches.

Jiangshi films declined in popularity around the mid-1990s. There was a brief resurgence in jiangshi and vampire films during the early 2000s. Tsui Hark produced The Era of Vampires in 2002 and The Twins Effect, directed by Dante Lam and Donnie Yen, was released in 2003. The Era of Vampires was not a comedy like earlier jiangshi films, a move that provoked criticisms from the genre's fans who felt that the film was trying to appeal to a more "Hollywood" demographic. In 2009, Katy Chang made Nanjing Road, a jiangshi horror movie set against China's economic expansion. In 2013, Juno Mak made Rigor Mortis as a tribute to earlier series such as Mr. Vampire. In 2014, Daniel Chan made Sifu vs Vampire.

Jiangshi films have attracted an international audience since its heyday. In the West, the genre is popular because it both resembles and is distinct from the monsters of European and American folklore. It is also popular in the Chinese diaspora and in southeast Asia.

== Television series ==
- The Jackie Chan Adventures episode "Chi of the Vampire" involves the main characters being attacked by a jiangshi while visiting an abandoned mountain castle in China. The vampire was previously blind and weak but begins to drain the chi of Tohru, Jade, and Uncle to regain its strength, which would make it powerful enough to survive the morning sun. Tohru and Jade survived becoming slaves of the jiangshi by transferring their chi, except for Uncle who became the vampire's servant. In order to take back their chi before sunrise, the Chans must find a toadstool in a graveyard and place it in the jiangshi's left sock and throw it into a river. After the stolen chi is returned, the jiangshi is destroyed by sunlight and reduced to dust.
- In Power Rangers: Jungle Fury, the minions led by the main antagonist Dai Shi, known as Rin Shi, seem to be based on the jiangshi. The association is clearer in its parent Super Sentai season, Juken Sentai Gekiranger, whose enemy footsoldiers have the same name but are rendered as one word, Rinshi.
- In Three Delivery, Mr. Von Yang uses the Hopsink Shrimp recipe to bring back his deceased twin brother Tommy from the grave, but in the process awakens a horde of Jiangshi that terrorize Chinatown.
- Jiangshi appear in Kung Fu Panda: Legends of Awesomeness, in the episode "The Po Who Cried Ghost". In this version, jiangshi are zombie-like specters that are formed after the living did not pay them any respect, after which they rise from the grave to seek revenge by devouring the brains of the living. In this version, jiangshi are also called “hopping ghosts” as they can only move by hopping due to being stiff from their death. They also have the power to paralyze their victims with their horrible-smelling "death" breath. And similar to zombies, if a living being is bitten by a jiangshi, they will become one.
- Jiangshi appear in Dragon Ball Super where they are depicted as human-type Earthlings transformed into jiangshi by witchcraft using special paper talismans. This technique is used by former Crane School student Yurin to take revenge on Tien Shinhan by turning his students and Master Roshi into jiangshi. However, Goku manages to defeat Jiangshi Max Power Master Roshi due to Yurin failing to command Roshi to counter Goku's Kamehameha. Tien and Goku foil Yurin's plot and allow the transformed students to return to normal. However, the students destroyed a nearby town while in Jiangshi form, forcing Tien to take part in the Tournament of Power to pay to fix the damages.
- Japanese professional wrestler the Great-O-Khan adopted a costume and ring entrance inspired by the jiangshi while on a learning excursion in Britain's Revolution Pro Wrestling after graduating from the New Japan Dojo. The wrestler himself, Tomoyuki Oka, has Chinese-Mongolian ancestry. However, his persona is still that of a normal (brutish) human.
- A supporting character of Jentry Chau vs. the Underworld is a jiangshi known as Ed. In this version, jiangshi are undead creatures from the Diyu (i.e., the underworld). They are shown to be intelligent and able to walk normally rather than hopping. Ed is the one of Jentry's friends/sidekick who often aids her in her various adventures. He is usually a small and humanoid being but is able to transform into a much larger form with a rotating mask that depicts his current emotions.

== Video games ==
- In Touhou Shinreibyou ~ Ten Desires, the boss of the 3rd stage, Yoshika Miyako, is a jiangshi.
- Hsien-Ko from the Darkstalkers fighting game series is a jiangshi.
- The video game Sleeping Dogs, which takes place in Hong Kong, features an expansion called Nightmare in North Point. The expansion is based on Chinese horror and folklore and features jiangshi as enemies to fight.
- The hero Mei from the Blizzard video game Overwatch has a jiangshi-inspired skin for the Halloween Terror 2017 in-game event, as well as a "hopping" emote where she will hop continuously in a straight line with her arms outstretched.
- Jiangshi (going by their Japanese names of Kyonshi) are the primary enemies in the Nintendo Entertainment System video game Phantom Fighter. However, they are mistakenly referred to as zombies instead of vampires.
- Jiangshi-inspired enemies called Pionpi appear in the Chai Kingdom, the fourth and final world of the 1989 Game Boy video game Super Mario Land.
- Jiangshi are featured as enemies in the game Spelunky. They can be found as early as the second area of the game.
- Munak and Bongun are monsters found in the South Korean MMORPG Ragnarok Online and have the same appearance and behavior as the jiangshi.
- The Tale of the Dragon DLC for the strategy game Age of Mythology: Extended Edition, which features units based on various mythical creatures, has the jiangshi as a possible unit for the god Shennong.
- A Jiangshi appears as a secret and optional miniboss in Castlevania: Order of Ecclesia.
- In Kingdom Hearts II, the Nightwalker Heartless enemies, which primarily appear in the Land of Dragons world based on Mulan, are based on jiangshi.
- A jiangshi-inspired hat, the Kyonshi Hat, was added on October 5, 2018, to Splatoon 2 as part of a Halloween event.
- Jiangshi are playable zombies in Counter-Strike Online in some modes: Zombie: The Hero, Zombie-Z, Zombie 2
- Kyonpan, an unused Pokémon from Pokémon Gold and Silver, is based on the jiangshi.
- In the science fiction horror game SOMA, there are reanimated corpse monsters who act like ghosts and are referred to as jiangshi.
- An insect (praying mantis) inspired version of the jiangshi appears in Sucker Punch Productions' 2005 video game Sly 3: Honor Among Thieves in the heist episode A Cold Alliance, they are the only non-Chinese Zodiac inspired enemy to appear in the enemy boss General Tsao's entourage.
- Genshin Impact, a 2020 video game by miHoYo, features a playable character named Qiqi who is based on the jiangshi, though she is referred to as a "zombie" in the English-language version of the game.
- In SNK vs. Capcom: SVC Chaos, Ghosts 'n Goblins recurring enemy Red Arremer can be fought in a secret boss battle. If Chun-Li loses to him, she will turn into a jiangshi.

== Tabletop games ==
Jiangshi: Blood in the Banquet Hall, a 2021 tabletop role-playing game by Banana Chan and Sen-Foong Lim, is about Chinese immigrants to the US and Canada managing a family restaurant while battling Jiangshi.

== See also ==
- Vampire literature
- Zombie film

== Bibliography ==
- Chiang, Sing-Chen Lydia (2005). Collecting the Self: Body and Identity in Strange Tale Collections of Late Imperial China. Brill. ISBN 978-90-04-14203-9.
- Hudson, Dale (2009). "Modernity as Crisis: Goeng Si and Vampires in Hong Kong Cinema". In John Edgar Browning and Caroline Joan (Kay) Picart (ed.). Draculas, Vampires, and Other Undead Forms: Essays on Gender, Race and Culture. Lanham, Md.: The Scarecrow Press. pp. 203–234. ISBN 978-0-8108-6923-3.
- Lam, Stephanie (2009). "Hop on Pop: Jiangshi Films in a Transnational Context". CineAction (78): 46–51.
- Stokes, Lisa Odham (2007). Historical Dictionary of Hong Kong Cinema. Rowman & Littlefield. ISBN 978-0-8108-5520-5.
