= Slickers vs. Killers =

1991 Hong Kong film by Sammo Hung

Slickers Vs. Killers
- VCD cover
- Traditional Chinese: 黐線枕邊人
- Simplified Chinese: 黐线枕边人
- Hanyu Pinyin: Chī Xiàn Zhěn Biān Rén
- Jyutping: Ci1 Sin3 Zam2 Bin1 Jan4
- Directed by: Sammo Hung
- Screenplay by: Sze-to Cheuk-hon; Barry Wong
- Produced by: Sammo Hung
- Starring: Sammo Hung; Carol Cheng; Lam Ching-ying; Jacky Cheung; Joyce Godenzi; Yu Li; Collin Chou
- Cinematography: Jimmy Leung
- Edited by: Lo Kin
- Music by: Lowell Lo
- Production company: Bojon Films
- Distributed by: Newport Entertainment
- Release date: 13 September 1991
- Running time: 99 minutes
- Country: Hong Kong
- Language: Cantonese
- Box office: HK$5,724,819

Slickers vs. Killers (Chinese: 黐線枕邊人) is a 1991 Hong Kong action comedy film starring, directed, and produced by Sammo Hung. The screenplay was written by Sze-to Cheuk-hon and Barry Wong. The film co-stars Carol Cheng, Lam Ching-ying, Jacky Cheung, Joyce Godenzi, Yu Li, and Collin Chou. The film was released theatrically in Hong Kong on 13 September 1991.

== Plot ==
Although a hapless telephone salesman, Success Hung finds himself engaged in a selling war with a new saleswoman, Miss Cheng, that soon proves to be the least of his problems. After witnessing a feud between two hitmen and a local gang of triads, Hung finds himself the target of the more neurotic and violent of the two hitmen, Bat. Having survived various attempts on his life by the hitmen, Bat and Owl, Hung also discovers that his wife Lisa's policeman colleague Ai has more than a professional interest in her. Taking a leaf out of Bat and Owl's book, the jealous policeman also decides that Hung would be better off dead. In one madcap night, all of these problems are solved with poor old Hung naturally in the middle of it all.

== Cast ==
- Sammo Hung as Success Hung
- Carol Cheng as Miss Cheng
- Lam Ching-ying as Owl
- Jacky Cheung as Bat
- Joyce Godenzi as Doctor Ko
- Yu Li as Lisa Yu
- Collin Chou as Ai
- Richard Ng as Mr. Chow
- Tommy Wong as murder victim
- Teddy Yip as Boss Yip
- Billy Ching as gang member
- Billy Lau as man at mall
- Clifton Ko as Robert
- Lo Kin as gang leader
- Yam Wai-hung as gang member
- Pauline Wong as female cop
- Wu Zhan-peng as victim
- Huang Kai-sen as Wong Sam
- Hon Ping as gang member
- Tsim Siu-ling as gang member
- Timmy Hung as gang member
- Chu Wan-ling as gang member
- Yuen Miu as cop
- Leung Kei-hei as waiter
- Lam Kwok-kit as gang member

== Box office ==
The film grossed HK$5,724,819 at the Hong Kong box office during its theatrical run from 13 to 25 September 1991 in Hong Kong.

== See also ==
- Jacky Cheung filmography
- List of Hong Kong films of 1991
- Sammo Hung filmography
