= Lover's Tear =

1992 Hong Kong film by Jacob Cheung

- Film poster
- Traditional Chinese: 誓不忘情
- Jyutping: sai6 bat1 mong4 cing4
- Directed by: Jacob Cheung
- Written by: Lee Chi-Ngai
- Produced by: Sammo Hung; Lam Ching-ying
- Starring: Nina Li Chi; Ngai Sing
- Cinematography: Andy Lam
- Edited by: Henry Cheung Siu-Hei
- Music by: John Sands
- Production companies: Bojon Films Co., Ltd.
- Distributed by: Newport Entertainment Co., Ltd. (Hong Kong)
- Release date: 21 May 1992
- Running time: 97 minutes
- Country: Hong Kong
- Language: Cantonese
- Box office: HK $2,196,154

Lover's Tear (Chinese: 誓不忘情) is a 1992 Hong Kong romantic-action film directed by Jacob Cheung and starring Nina Li Chi and Ngai Sing.

== Plot ==
Deaf prostitute Fang I Ling (Nina Li Chi) is saved by gangster Lin Wei (Elvis Tsui Kam-Kong) who decides to make her his moll. Although he genuinely cares for her she doesn't feel the same way yet sticks by him. Things begin to change after she witnesses the murder of security official Su Erh (Yukari Oshima) and must help police officer Chung Ao (Ngai Sing) who has been accused of the crime clear his name. The couple soon fall in love while being pursued by the chief lieutenant (Lam Ching-ying) and the police chief (Sammo Hung). Despite the police chief believing in Ngai's innocence he must do him duty by taking him in.

== Cast ==
- Nina Li Chi as Fang I Ling
- Ngai Sing as love interest Inspector Chung Ho
- Elvis Tsui as Fang's boyfriend Lin Wei
- Lam Ching-ying as Chief Lieutenant Cheng Ying
- Sammo Hung as Police Commissioner Kung
