= Kung Fu Kid (1994 film) =

1994 Hong Kong film by Lee Chiu

- Traditional Chinese: 少林英雄之方世玉洪熙官
- Jyutping: siu2 lam4 jing1 hung4 zi1 fong1 sai3 juk6 hung4 hei1 gun1
- Directed by: Lee Chiu
- Written by: Lee Chiu; Lo Chi; Wong Shu-kei
- Produced by: Chang Shan-kung
- Starring: Chin Ka-lok; Lam Ching-ying
- Cinematography: Mo Ming
- Edited by: Kuo Ting-hung
- Music by: Lam Kwong-tim
- Release date: 1994
- Running time: 86 minutes
- Country: Hong Kong
- Language: Cantonese

Kung Fu Kid (also known as Shaolin Heroes and Shaolin Avengers) is a 1994 Hong Kong martial arts film directed by Lee Chiu and written by Chiu alongside Lo Chi and Wong Shu-kei. The film stars Chin Ka-lok, Lam Ching-ying, Kwan Hoi-san, and Siqin Gaowa. Kung Fu Kid was Lam Ching-ying's final film appearance before his death in 3 years later on 8 November 1997.

== Plot ==
Set during the time of the Qing dynasty, Manchurian troops attempt to close a Shaolin temple. Temple disciple and a young fighter called Feng Shi-Yu fight against them.

== Cast ==
- Lam Ching-ying as temple disciple Hong Zhi-Guan
- Chin Ka-lok as Feng Shi-yu a young fighter
- Kwan Hoi-san as Feng Shi-yu's father
- Siqin Gaowa as Feng Shi-yu's mother
