= Midnight Vampire =

1936 Hong Kong film by Yeung Kung-leung

- Traditional Chinese: 午夜殭屍
- Simplified Chinese: 午夜僵尸
- Hanyu Pinyin: wǔ yè jiāng shī
- Jyutping: ng5 je6 goeng1 si1
- Directed by: Yeung Kung-Leung
- Written by: Yeung Kung-Leung
- Produced by: Chuk Ching-Yin
- Production company: Naam Yuet (Nanyue) Movie Company
- Release date: 30 July 1936
- Country: Hong Kong
- Language: Cantonese

Midnight Vampire (午夜殭屍) is a 1936 Hong Kong film directed by Yeung Kung-Leung. It is the first film to feature a jiangshi (Chinese hopping vampire).

== Cast ==
- Yeung Yat-Ping
- Woo Dip-Ying
- Chao Fei-Fei
- Chiu King-Wan
- Chu Po-Chuen
- Wong Sau-Nin
- Hoh Ho-Man
- Tsui Tai-Cheung
- Tsak Sin-Chung
- Cheng Lau-Kuen
