= The Era of Vampires =

2002 Hong Kong film by Wellson Chin

- Singaporean DVD cover
- Traditional Chinese: 千年殭屍王
- Simplified Chinese: 千年僵尸王
- Hanyu Pinyin: Qiān Nián Jiāng Shī Wáng
- Jyutping: Cin1 Nin4 Geong1 Si1 Wong4
- Directed by: Wellson Chin
- Written by: Tsui Hark
- Produced by: Tsui Hark
- Starring: Danny Chan; Michael Chow; Ken Chang; Lam Suet; Yu Rongguang
- Cinematography: Joe Chan; Sunny Tsang; Herman Yau
- Edited by: Marco Mak
- Music by: J.M. Logan
- Production companies: Film Workshop; Hark & Co. Fortissimo Films
- Release date: 2002
- Running time: 94 minutes
- Country: Hong Kong
- Language: Cantonese

The Era of Vampires is a 2002 Hong Kong martial arts horror film directed by Wellson Chin and written and produced by Tsui Hark. An edited version of the film was released in North America under the title Tsui Hark's Vampire Hunters. The film lacked comedy, a departure from earlier jiangshi films like Mr. Vampire that were popular in the 1980s.

== Cast ==
- Danny Chan Kwok-kwan as Choi
- Michael Chow as Fat
- Ken Chang as Hei
- Lam Suet as Kung
- Yu Rongguang as Master Jiang
- Anya as Sasa
- Horace Lee as Dragon Tang
- Ji Chun-hua as Master Mao Shan
- Chen Kuan-tai as Zombie wrangler
- Lee Kin-yan as Geomancer
- Lee Lik-chi as Butler
- Wong Yat-fei as Undertaker
- Sze Mei-yee as Clothing salesman
- Zou Na as Ling
