= Mr. Vampire 1992 =

1992 Hong Kong film by Ricky Lau

- Film poster
- Traditional Chinese: 新殭屍先生
- Simplified Chinese: 新僵尸先生
- Hanyu Pinyin: Xīn Jiāngshī Xiānshēng
- Jyutping: San1 Goeng1 Si1 Sin1 Sang1
- Directed by: Ricky Lau
- Written by: Lo Wing-keung
- Produced by: Yip Wing-cho
- Starring: Ricky Hui; Lam Ching-ying; Sandra Ng; Chin Siu-ho; Billy Lau; Suki Kwan; Tsui Man-wah; Tam Hoi-yan; Yip Wing-cho; Siu Yam-yam
- Cinematography: Lam Fai-tai
- Edited by: Chuen Chi
- Music by: Anders Nelsson; Simon Leung
- Production companies: Grand March Movie Production Co., Ltd.
- Distributed by: Golden Princess Amusement Co., Ltd.
- Release date: 8 August 1992
- Running time: 88 minutes
- Country: Hong Kong
- Language: Cantonese
- Box office: HK$6,365,497

Mr. Vampire 1992, also known as Chinese Vampire Story, is a 1992 Hong Kong comedy horror film directed by Ricky Lau. The film is the fifth of a series of five jiangshi films directed by Ricky Lau in the Mr. Vampire franchise. The Chinese title of the film literally translates to New Mr. Vampire.

Mr. Vampire 1992 is considered to be the true sequel to the original 1985 Mr. Vampire, as the main cast (Lam Ching-ying, Ricky Hui and Chin Siu-ho) in the first film reprised their roles. Mr. Vampire 1992 is also set directly after the events in Mr. Vampire, with some references to the first film, such as Man-choi commenting on how he felt after being infected with the "hopping corpse virus". New characters were introduced in Mr. Vampire 1992, and some actors from the first film, such as Billy Lau, were recast in new roles.

== Plot ==
The film is based on the concept of the souls of aborted fetuses who reside in statues awaiting reincarnation. One of these is a particularly nasty soul who possesses a nanny. She in turn sets to work to find the suitable host pregnant lady, which turns out to be Priest Kau's childhood sweetheart, Mai Kei-lin.

The other storyline involves a General (who is married to the aforementioned Mai) who was infected by the vampire virus from his dead father and seeks Kau's help in healing him. This involves grinding the fangs of his vampiric father to make the antidote. After failing in the task, Kau's disciples are sent to hunt out a group of vampires to obtain their fangs.

Both storylines converge at the finale with the demon child taking full possession of Mei and the group of vampires seeking revenge in a final all-out battle at the General's residence.

== Cast ==
- Lam Ching-ying as Master Kau (九叔)
- Ricky Hui as Man-choi (文才)
- Chin Siu-ho as Chau-sang (秋生)
- Sandra Ng as Kwan-yue
- Billy Lau as the General
- Suki Kwan as Mai Kei-lin (米淇蓮)
- Tam Hoi-yan as Mai Nim-ying
- Tsui Man-wah as Mai Kei-lin's nanny
- Yu Miu-Lin as the female jiangshi
- Si Gai-keung as Darn
- Goo Wai-jan as Wai-heung
- Lee Hin-ming as Wai-heung's husband
- Tse Wai-kit as Kiu
- Lee Chi-git as a jiangshi victim
- Bowie Lam
- Michael Chan

=== Guest stars ===
- Yip Wing-cho as the General's sushi chef
- Siu Yam-yam as the retarded boy's mother
