= Vampire vs Vampire =

1989 Hong Kong film by Lam Ching-ying

Vampire Vs Vampire
- DVD cover
- Traditional Chinese: 一眉道人
- Simplified Chinese: 一眉道人
- Hanyu Pinyin: yī méi dàorén
- Jyutping: jat1 mei4 dou3 jan4
- Directed by: Lam Ching-ying
- Written by: Sam Chi-leung; Chan Kam-cheong; Sze Mei-yee
- Produced by: Chua Lam
- Starring: Lam Ching-ying; Chin Siu-ho; David Lui; Sandra Ng; Billy Lau; Maria Cordero
- Cinematography: Cho On-sun; Kwan Chi-kam
- Edited by: Peter Cheung
- Music by: Anders Nelsson; The Melody Bank; Alastair Monteith-Hodge; Tim Nugent
- Production companies: Diagonal Pictures; Paragon Films
- Distributed by: Golden Harvest
- Release date: 26 July 1989
- Running time: 84 minutes
- Country: Hong Kong
- Language: Cantonese
- Box office: HK$11.19 million

Vampire Vs Vampire (一眉道人; lit. 'One Eyebrow Daoist Priest') is a 1989 Hong Kong comedy horror film directed by and starring Lam Ching-ying. The title references the interaction in the film between a jiangshi child, a creature from Chinese "hopping" corpse fiction, and a British vampire based on Western vampire fiction.

== Plot ==
Chinese exorcist One-Eyebrow Priest (Lam Ching-ying) leads a peaceful life with two disciples Ah Ho (Chin Siu-ho) and Ah Fong (David Lui) in a small town together with a mischievous miniature jiangshi. While finding new water sources one day, the priest encounters a European vampire in the nearby church who is aided by a dead countess. Although the priest manages to get rid of the countess, his Chinese exorcism fails on the European vampire.

== Cast ==
- Lam Ching-ying as One Eyebrow Priest
- Chin Siu-ho as Ah Hoo
- David Lui as Ah Fong
- Maria Cordero as Mother Superior
- Billy Lau as General
- Sandra Ng as General's Cousin
- Regina Kent as Nun
- Frank Juhas as European vampire

== Home media ==
=== Laserdisc ===
Release date	Country	Classifaction	Publisher	Catalog No	Format	Language	Subtitles	Notes	REF
Unknown	Japan	N/A	Towa Video		CLV / NTSC	Cantonese	Japaneses	Audio Mono	
1993	Hong Kong	N/A		ML091	CLV / NTSC	Cantonese	English / Chinese	Audio Mono	

=== VCD ===
Release date	Country	Classifaction	Publisher	Format	Language	Subtitles	Notes	REF
1 March 2000	Hong Kong	N/A	Joy Sales (HK)	NTSC	Cantonese, Mandarin	English, Traditional Chinese	2VCDs	

=== DVD ===
Release date	Country	Classifaction	Publisher	Format	Region	Language	Sound	Subtitles	Notes	REF
17 May 2002	Hong Kong	N/A	Deltamac (HK)	NTSC	ALL	Cantonese, Mandarin	Dolby Digital	English, Traditional Chinese, Simplified Chinese		
20 May 2003	United States	Unrated	Tai Seng	NTSC	1	Cantonese, Chinese	Dolby	Chinese, English		
4 July 2006	Taiwan	N/A	Catalyst Logic	NTSC	3	Cantonese and Mandarin	Dolby Digital 2.0	English, Traditional Chinese		
2 February 2009	Hong Kong	N/A	Joy Sales (HK)	NTSC	ALL	Cantonese, Mandarin	Dolby Digital 2.0	English, Traditional Chinese, Simplified Chinese		

=== Blu-ray ===
Release date	Country	Classifaction	Publisher	Format	Language	Subtitles	Notes	REF
21 May 2023	United Kingdom	15	Eureka Video	Region B	Cantonese	English	Included in set of four of the Mr. Vampire sequels.	
