= Money Crazy =

1977 Hong Kong film by John Woo

- 發錢寒
- Directed by: John Woo
- Written by: John Woo
- Produced by: Raymond Chow (executive producer); Louis Sit
- Starring: Richard Ng; Ricky Hui
- Cinematography: Jimmy Yu Chun
- Edited by: Cheung Yiu-Chung
- Music by: Frankie Chan
- Production company: Golden Harvest Productions
- Release date: 29 July 1977 (Hong Kong)
- Running time: 86 minutes
- Country: Hong Kong
- Language: Cantonese

Money Crazy (Chinese: 發錢寒; Jyutping: faat3 cin4 hon4), also known as The Pilferer's Progress or Hired Guns, is a 1977 Hong Kong action comedy film directed by John Woo.

== Plot ==
Poison hires his friends to attack Rich Chan so that he can pretend to fight them off, thereby getting himself hired as Rich Chan's new bodyguard. Rich Chan then hires Dragon of the Courageous Dragon Detective Agency to deliver three diamonds for him. The two conmen Poison and Dragon recognize each other and threaten to expose each other to their new boss. After receiving the diamonds, Dragon is abducted by Mary and her men. Poison fights off Mary's men as well as a Ping, a man hired by Rich Chan to kill Dragon. Poison then fights Dragon for the gemstones, which fall into the street and are crushed by a steamroller. The diamonds turn out to have been fake, so the two conmen realize that Rich Chan has set them up. They decide to help Mary, whose adoptive father "Uncle" was cheated out of his money and his family diamonds by Rich Chan.

Using Dragon's detective gear, they spy on Rich Chan and discover that he keeps the diamonds around his neck at all times. Poison lowers Dragon by a rope over Rich Chan's bed while he is sleeping, but Rich Chan is awakened by Poison's sweat dripping on him and the two thieves must flee. Dragon later calls Rich Chan and tells him that he stole the real diamonds and replaced them with paste diamonds, demanding money for the return of the "real" ones. Rich Chan calls gemologist Liu Fu to examine his gems, but Dragon dresses up as Liu Fu and switches the real diamonds with fake ones during the examination. They then offer to give him back the real ones in exchange for HK$2 million, but at the meet-up they steal the money and flee on a motorcycle, allowing them to return the diamonds to "Uncle" and also make money for themselves. They discover that the money is counterfeit, but "Uncle" shares his diamonds with them and Mary.

== Cast ==
- Richard Ng as Dragon / Liu Fu (2 roles)
- Ricky Hui as Poison
- Agee Chiu as Mary
- Lee Hoi-Sang as Rich Chan's bodyguard
- Cheung Ying as Rich Chan
- Cheng Suk-Ying as Rich Chan's secretary
- Yue Ming as Uncle
- Helena Law Lan as Rich Chan's wife
- Mars as Hitman
- Chan Wui-ngai as Hitman
- Lam Ching-Ying as Hitman
- Addy Sung Gam-Loi as Ping
- Tai San as Attacks Rich Chan
- Eric Tsang as Mary's accomplice
- Fung Ging-Man as Rich Chan's employee
- Lam Hak-Ming as Mary's accomplice
- Lee Pang-Fei as Poison's boss on boat
- Chin Chun as Poison's boss with briefcase
- Hao Li-Jen as Poison's boss with beard
- Fung Hak-On as Attacks Rich Chan
- Wan Ling-Kwong as Motorcycle policeman
- King Lee King-Chu as Attacks Rich Chan
- Lee Hang as Robber
- Wong Chi-Keung as Robber
- Anthony Moya
- Cheung Wing-Hon as Extra
- Dick Wei

== Production ==
This was the first film for which the director was credited under the name "John Y. S. Woo". It was also his first comedy.

The film was shot in Hong Kong.

The martial arts directors were Fung Hak-On and Huang Ha.

The theme song was composed, written & sung by Samuel Hui and Ricky Hui.

== Release ==
The film was released theatrically in Hong Kong on 29 July 1977. The film was a smash hit, becoming the #1 Hong Kong film of 1977.

== Reception ==
Jeremy Carr of Senses of Cinema wrote, "A comic lark revolving around lottery winnings, Money Crazy boasts a lively and often ludicrous blend of clever gimmicks, sight and sound gags, and comic strip foolishness while still finding time for exaggerated fisticuffs, a scheming criminal element, and some whimsical romantic effects."

Reviewer Kenneth Brorsson of sogoodreviews.com wrote, "for several years, John Woo dabbled in comedy collaborations with Ricky Hui, starting with Money Crazy. Slow pace dominate from the start and the style of comedy, while universal, is often the pratfall accompanied by silly sound effect-kind, leading only to mild amusement. Ricky Hui is strangely distant which can be due to this not being a vehicle together with his brothers Michael and Sam but Richard Ng pretty much is responsible for any laughs in Money Crazy. Still, there's only a chuckle and a half to be found in Woo's film and even the inclusion of crude gunplay doesn't spark much interest."

Reviewer Andrew Saroch of fareastfilms.com gave the film a rating of 3 out of 5 stars, writing, "Taking some obvious cues from the 70s hits of Michael Hui, 'Money Crazy' is an episodic musing on the money-hungry attitude of a few ordinary men. While Hui's work tends to weave in a satirical edge, Woo concentrates on a more slapstick approach that, at times, loses its direction. Woo's handling of the material lacks the exquisite touches that made Hui's classics milestones in Hong Kong and his control over the proceedings – as seen in his other comedies – is found wanting. For these reasons, 'Money Crazy' is very much a poor man's 'Private Eyes' or 'Games Gamblers' Play' [sic]. Though it's not in the same league as the Michael Hui hits it tries to emulate, 'Money Crazy' is still reasonably entertaining and certainly better than Woo’s other ventures into the genre. [...] 'Money Crazy' is a production that is not devoid of the odd moment of humour and presents a generally entertaining atmosphere throughout its running time."

Reviewer Martin Sandison of cityonfire.com gave the film a rating of 6.5 out of 10, writing, "Overall, The Pliferer's Progress is well-constructed, silly fun. It's great to see Ng and Hui hamming it up with some decent screen chemistry. Just don’t expect anything approaching the level of Woo’s best movies in terms of film-making and depth."

Reviewer Seb on Fire of darksidereviews.com gave the film a rating of 7 out of 10, writing, "In the end, Money Crazy is a good little seventies comedy, lively and very likeable, which allows us to discover a little-known facet of John Woo's personality who, if he has not yet found his operatic and melodramatic style, stages with precision and know-how this comedy in which we can find the embryos of what will be his future masterpieces."

Reviewer Andrew Heskins of EasternKicks gave the film a rating of 3.5 out of 5 stars, writing, "pay close attention and you see Woo use the same painstaking care he would to orchestrate his grand action sequences as he does to set them up. One scene, where Dragon is hung from the ceiling over Rich Chan's bed to steel the diamonds from around his neck, manages not only to be every bit as tense as the atrium dive Woo would later film for Mission: Impossible II, but also packs in some great jokes along the way (including Dragon using an umbrella to catch his ridiculous amount of sweat)."

The Manchester Review called the film a "hilarious slapstick comedy".

The review on serp.media reads, "The movie features a thrilling plot that revolves around Ducky, a character hired by Rich Chen to transport “diamonds” stolen from Uncle Pai Mary."

The website onderhond.com gave the film a rating of 2 out of 5.
