= An Eternal Combat =

1991 Hong Kong film by Thomas Yip

- Traditional Chinese: 天地玄門
- Simplified Chinese: 天地玄门
- Hanyu Pinyin: Tiāndì Xuánmén
- Directed by: Thomas Yip
- Written by: Ho Tung
- Produced by: Yuen Gam-Lun
- Starring: Joey Wong; Lam Ching Ying; Shing Fui-On; Anthony Wong; Joh Chung-Sing; Gabriel Wong Yat Shan
- Cinematography: Chee Kok Wah
- Edited by: Peter Jiang
- Music by: Phil Chen; Siu-Lam Tang
- Production company: Chun Sing Film Co.
- Distributed by: D&B Film Distribution
- Release date: 5 January 1991 (Hong Kong)
- Running time: 95 minutes
- Country: Hong Kong
- Language: Cantonese
- Box office: HK $6,469,570.00

An Eternal Combat (Chinese: 天地玄門) is a 1991 Hong Kong fantasy horror film directed by Thomas Yip and written by Ho Tung. The film stars Joey Wong, Lam Ching Ying, Shing Fui-On, Anthony Wong, Joh Chung-Sing and Gabriel Wong Yat Shan. The film was released in Hong Kong on 5 January 1991.

== Plot ==
In the period of Hongzhi Emperor (1487-1505) in the Ming dynasty (1368-1644), the Japanese Ghost King does all kinds of evil in the Chinese territory. When he meets Shi Shi, a beautiful young woman, he falls in love with her and forces Shi Shi to marry him. Caolu Jushi, a Maoshan Taoist priest, is always ready to defend the weak and helpless. Caolu Jushi and his disciple fight with the Japanese Ghost King but fail. At that time, Ma Shangfeng, an official in the imperial court, helps to capture the Japanese Ghost King. A war triggers the gate of the universe, they cross the time and space and comes to Hong Kong in the 20th Century.

== Cast ==
- Joey Wong as Shi Shi (施施), a beautiful Ming dynasty woman.
- Lam Ching Ying as Caolu Jushi (草庐居士), a Maoshan Taoist priest.
- Shing Fui-On as Ma Shangfeng (马尚峰), an official in the Ming Empire.
- Anthony Wong as Ben
- Joh Chung-Sing as the Japanese Ghost King (鬼王)
- Gabriel Wong Yat Shan
- Lau Siu Ming as the mental patient.
- Hui Shiu-hung as the Father.

== Music ==
Song	Composer	Lyricist	Singer	Notes
"Tiandi Youyou" (天地悠悠)	Phil Chen	Poon Wai Yuen	Wang Hong	Theme

== Release ==
The film premiered in Hong Kong on 5 January 1991.

== Box office ==
The film grossed HK $6,469,570.00.
