= Billy Lau =

Hong Kong actor, director and writer

Billy Lau Nam Kwong
- 樓南光
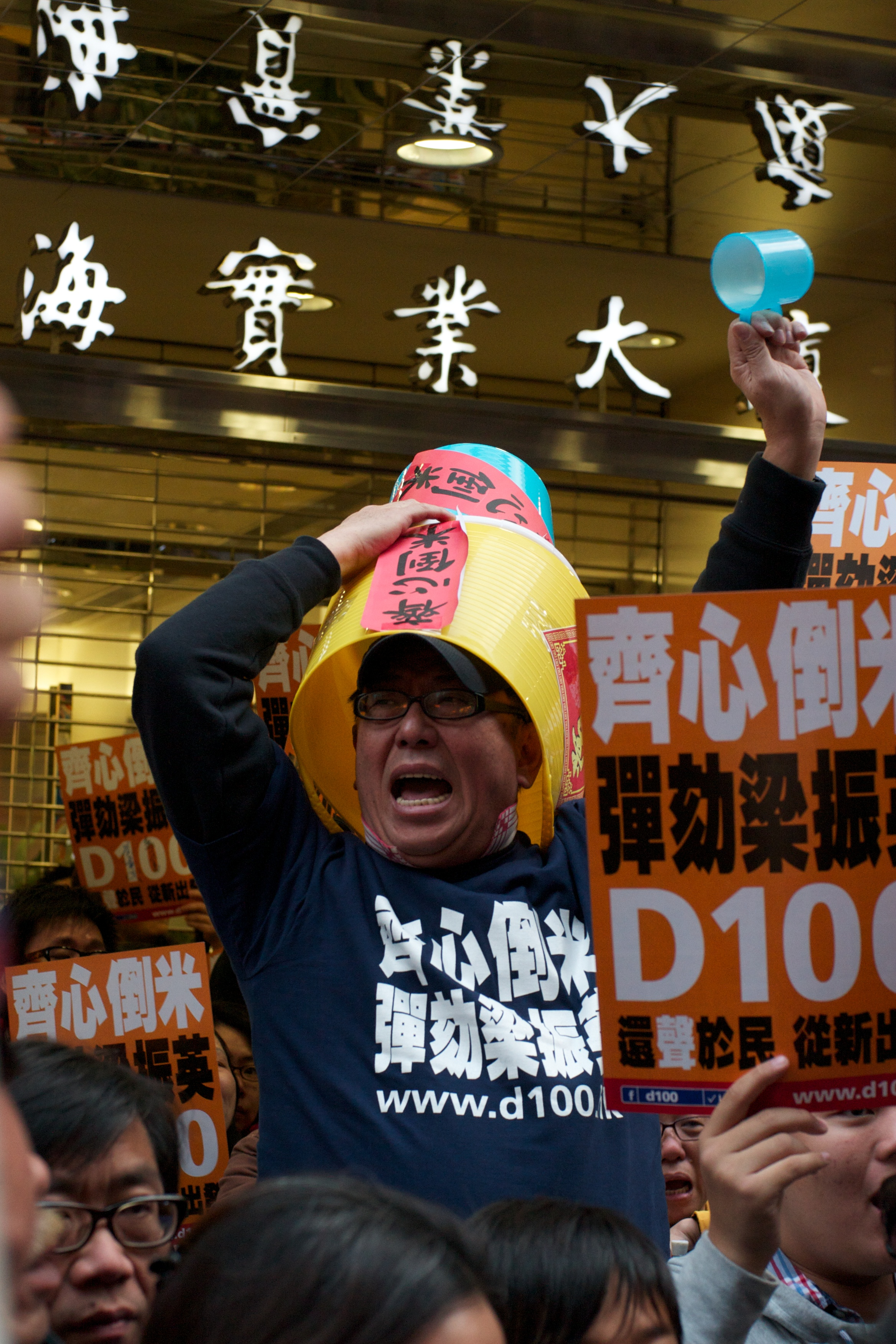
- Lau at a protest in Hong Kong in 2013
- Born: April 3, 1954 (age 72); Hong Kong
- Occupation: Actor
- Years active: 1982–current

Billy Lau Nam Kwong (born 3 April 1954) is a Hong Kong film actor. He is best known for playing the Police Captain in Mr. Vampire (1985), and went on to be cast in similar roles. He has appeared in many comedy and horror films.

== Personal life ==
After the closure of Digital Broadcasting Corporation on 10 October 2012. Lau, activists and radio hosts began a three-day sit-in protest in front of the government headquarters due to freedom of speech concerns. Lau went on hunger strike more than 130 hours and eventually went to hospital. An Internet radio station D100 was established due to the closure of Digital Broadcast Corporation.

== Filmography ==
=== TV series ===
Year	Title	Network	Role	Notes
1993	The Vampire Returns	TVB	Qu Yan	
1994	Shade of Darkness	TVB		
1995	Detective Investigation Files	TVB	Ding Sau Lai	
1995–1996	A Kindred Spirit	TVB	Leung Yun Choi	
1997	Chinese Folklore	TVB		
2001	Thank You Grandpa	ATV	Tong Xueli	
2002	Responsive	ATV	Tong Xueli	
2002	Project Ji Xiang	ATV	Ke Deli	
2003	Light of Million Hopes	ATV	Wu Guanghong	
2004	Mama, I Love You	ATV	Cheng Long	
2004	Cross Border Daddy	ATV	Zengjing Ci	
2005	Go! Go! Daddy	ATV	Zengjing Ci	
2005	Danger Counter	ATV	Huang Qiang	
2005	Hi there this logic	ATV	Teng Takumi	
2005–2006	一雙筷子走天涯	ATV		
2006	Spitfire	ATV		
2006	Hong Kong Criminal Files	ATV	Tadakuni parent	
2007	Hong Kong Ghostbusters	ATV	Liu Ye	
2008	Today in Court	ATV	No Character name (Liar dog food case)	
2009	Hong Kong Gossip	ATV	LEUNG Suk steamed	
2009	Rooms to Let	RTHK		
2010	F.S.D	RTHK	Xiongge	

=== Films ===
Year	Title	Chinese Title	Role	Notes
1982	He Lives by Night	夜驚魂	Cashier of convenience store	
1982	It Takes Two	難兄難弟	Bing's thug	
1983	Aces Go Places II	難兄難弟	Bull's thug	AKA: Mad Mission II.
1983	Esprit d'amour	陰陽錯	Ming's colleague	Also Assistant Director.
1983	Men from the Gutter	暗渠	Brainless	
1984	Men from the Gutter	暗渠	Brainless	
1984	Heaven Can Help	上天救命	reporter	
1984	Double Trouble	大小不良	Lecher at ATM	
1984	Banana Cop	英倫琵琶	HK cop	Also Production Manager.
1984	Hong Kong 1941	等待黎明	Foreman	AKA: Waiting for Dawn, The Moment Has Come.
1984	The Ghost Informer	鬼線人	waiter in disco	
1985	Yes, Madam!	皇家師姐	Parking Inspector (Cameo)	UK title: Police Assassins.
1985	Mr. Vampire	殭屍先生	Wai (a.k.a. Police Captain)	
1985	Those Merry Souls	時來運轉	Doctor	
1985	My Lucky Stars	福星高照	Mental patient on bench	
1985	Cop Busters	拖錯車		
1985	Affectionately Yours	花仔多情	Ruddy's buddy	
1985	Twinkle Twinkle Lucky Stars	夏日福星	Play director (in movie)	AKA: The Target / Japanese title: Seven Lucky Stars.
1985	The Intellectual Trio	龍鳳智多星	Simon Tang	AKA: Intellectual Trio H2O.
1985	Chase a Fortune	吉人天相	Billy	Also Assistant Director.
1985	City Hero	飛虎奇兵	Old Bachelor	
1985	Friendly Ghost	老友鬼鬼	(cameo)	AKA: 瘋狂三寳
1986	My Heavenly Lover	我的愛神	Billy Tam	AKA: Mr Heavenly Lover (Hong Kong Film Archive.)
1986	Lucky Stars Go Places	最佳福星	Libbogen	
1986	The Millionaires' Express	富貴列車	Train Captain	AKA: The Millionaire's Express/ Shanghai Express.
1986	United We Stand	飛躍羚羊	Billy	
1986	Mr. Vampire Part 2	殭屍家族	Chicken	AKA: Mr. Vampire II/ Mr. Vampire 2.
1986	Naughty Boys	扭計雜牌軍	Ah Fu (Detective)	AKA: A Little Bit of Trick/ The Violent Caper.
1986	Sweet Sixteen	甜蜜十六歲	Teacher Lau	AKA: 十六歲正點.
1986	My Family	八喜臨門	Mr Lau	AKA: The Family
1986	The Strange Bedfellow	兩公婆八條心	Sgt Sing	AKA: 變形人.
1987	Mr. Vampire Part 3	靈幻先生	Captain Chiang (AKA: Qiang)	AKA: Mr. Vampire III/ Mr. Vampire 3.
1987	Eastern Condors	東方禿鷹	Ching Dai-Hao	
1987	The Haunted Cop Shop	猛鬼差館	Sneaky Ming	
1987	The Final Test	最後一戰	Dirty Nose	
1987	You're My Destiny	用愛捉伊人	traffic cop (cameo)	
1988	Police Story Part II	警察故事續集	ticketed truck driver	AKA: Police Story 2.
1988	No Compromise	赤膽情	Mr Chan	
1988	The Beloved Son of God	肥貓流浪記	mental patient playing headmaster	AKA: The Nowhereman/ Fat Cat/ Beloved Son of God.
1988	Carry On Hotel	金裝大酒店		
1988	My Dream Is Yours	夢過界	Bearded smoking cop	AKA: The Dream Is Yours.
1988	The Inspector Wears Skirts	霸王花	Nam	US Title: Top Squad.
1988	Bet on Fire	火舞風雲	club patron (cameo)	
1988	Operation Pink Squad	霸王女福星	Big Nose	
1988	Miss Magic	靈幻小姐	Billy Tung	AKA: Lady Vampire.
1988	Spooky, Spooky	鬼猛腳	Four Eyes	
1988	Into the Night	驚魂今晚夜	Burglar	
1988	The Haunted Cop Shop II	猛鬼學堂	Lazy Bone	AKA: 捉鬼特訓班.
1989	Funny Ghost	猛鬼撞鬼	Killer Ho	
1989	The Inspector Wears Skirts II	神勇飛虎霸王花	Nam	AKA: The Inspector Wears Skirts Part II.
1989	Unfaithfully Yours	花心三劍俠	China Gun	
1989	Mr. Canton and Lady Rose	奇蹟	Ah Tung	AKA: Miracles/ Canton Godfather/ Black Dragon.
1989	Vampire Vs Vampire	一眉道人	Captain	AKA: One Eyebrowed Priest.
1989	Pedicab Driver	群龍戲鳳	Coolie (cameo)	
1989	Mr. Smart	瀟酒先生	Kuang	
1989	Operation Pink Squad II	猛鬼大廈	Jealous married cop	AKA: Thunder Cops.
1989	Little Cop	小小小警察	Vice Squad Insp	AKA: Little Cup/ 小警察.
1990	A Tale from the East	漫畫奇俠	Chu Tat Lit	AKA: Tales from the East.
1990	The Fortune Code	富貴兵團	Donald Duck	
1990	Raid on Royal Casino Marine	霸王花之皇家賭船	Nam	AKA: Inspector Wears Skirts 3/ 皇家賭船(霸王花第三集.
1990	The Nocturnal Demon	夜魔先生	Master Snake	
1990	Here Comes a Vampire	猛鬼霸王花	Yung	
1990	The Spooky Family	捉鬼合家歡		AKA: Spooky Family.
1990	Vampire Settle on Police Camp	一眉道姑		AKA: 猛鬼系列之一眉道姑.
1991	Slickers Vs Killers	黐線枕邊人	man at mall	
1991	The Banquet	豪門夜宴		
1991	Vampire Kids	殭屍福星仔	Fatty	AKA: Vampire Resurrection.
1991	Devil's Vendetta	妖魔道	Tan Tin Kong	Actual on-screen title: Devil's Vindata.
1991	Sisters of the World Unite	莎莎嘉嘉站起來		
1992	Lethal Contact	龍貓燒鬚	Polar Bear	Also the Director.
1992	Ghost in Me	老友鬼上身	Xiao Lin	
1992	Mr. Vampire 1992	新殭屍先生	General	AKA: Chinese Vampire Story.
1992	Mad Mad Ghost	鬼打鬼之黃金道士	Landlord	AKA: 鬼打鬼之靈幻天師/ 正宗鬼打鬼之靈幻天師.
1992	A Kid from Tibet	西藏小子	Jail Warden	
1992	Skin Striperess	甩皮鬼	Mr Lau	AKA: The Skinned Ghost/ 金裝鬼打鬼/ Sexy Ghost/ 艷鬼
1992	Inspector Wears Skirts IV	92霸王花與霸王花	Lou Nan Pin	AKA: The Inspector Wear Skirts IV.
1993	Fatal Seduction	艷降		AKA: Woman Killer's Rampage.
1993	Blade of Fury	一刀傾城	Assistant Director	
1994	Don't Shoot Me, I'm Just a Violinist!	山雞變鳳凰	First Robber	
1994	The Gods Must Be Funny in China	非洲超人	Show Host	AKA: The God Must Be Funny in China.
1995	Don't Give a Damn	冇面俾	fainted cop (CID) (uncredited)	AKA: 摩登笑探/ US DVD Title: Burger Cop.
1995	Only Fools Fall in Love	呆佬拜壽	Sha Sam	AKA: 新威龍闖天關—傻瓜與野丫頭.
1999	Tender Heart	愛滋初體驗		AKA: 愛滋心.
2000	Guys and a Cop	賤男特警	Dick-cock	
2000	Humuhumunukupua	賤男人週記	Nonsee	
2000	The Temptation of Office Ladies	OL誘惑之各自各精彩	Johnny Koo	
2000	Guys and a Cop	賤男特警	Writer/ Planning	
2002	Sex & Zen Vol.3	偷情寶鑑Vol.3：性愛三十六房/ 荒淫無度		
2002	Sex & Zen Vol.4	偷情寶鑑Vol.4：十二性夜/ 閨房秘技		
2002	Sex and Zen as The Prostitute in Jiang Nan	偷情寶鑑–江南第一名妓	Johnny Koo	AKA: 偷情寶鑑：性奴/ Sex & Zen Vol.5
2007	Kung Fu Mahjong 3 – The Final Duel	雀聖3自摸三百番	Mahjong cheat	
2007	The Pye-Dog	野·良犬	Mr Leung	
2011	A Simple Life	桃姐	Mobster A	AKA: Miss Peach/ Sister Peach.
2013	Rigor Mortis	殭屍		

=== TV ads ===
- 1984–1986: Ocean Park Hong Kong

=== Accolades ===
- Lau was nominated for the Hong Kong Film Award for Best Supporting Actor and Best New Performer in 1986, losing to Mang Hoi and Chan Yuen-Lai, respectively.
