= Collin Chou =

Taiwanese actor (born 1967)

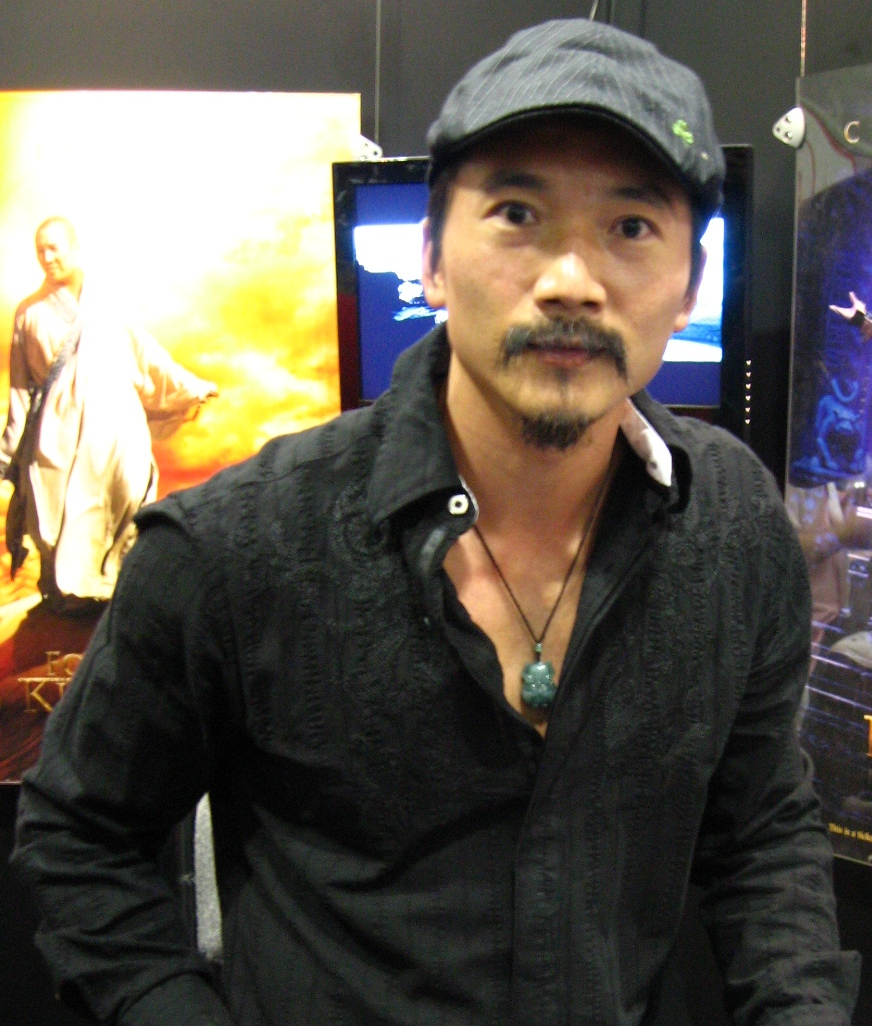
- Chou in March 2008
- Born: 11 August 1967 (age 59); Kaohsiung, Taiwan
- Other name: Ngai Sing
- Occupations: Actor; martial artist
- Spouse: Wanda Yung
- Children: 3

Chinese name
- Traditional Chinese: 鄒兆龍
- Simplified Chinese: 邹兆龙
Transcriptions
Standard Mandarin
- Hanyu Pinyin: Zōu Zhàolóng
Yue: Cantonese
- Jyutping: Zau^{1} Siu^{6}lung^{4}

Alternative Chinese name
- Chinese: 倪星
Transcriptions
Standard Mandarin
- Hanyu Pinyin: Ní Xīng
Yue: Cantonese
- Jyutping: Ngai^{4} Sing^{1}
- Website: Official website

Collin Chou Hsiao-long (Chinese: 鄒兆龍; pinyin: Zōu Zhàolóng; born 11 August 1967) is a Taiwanese actor and martial artist. He is known for his work in Hong Kong action cinema, and for portraying Seraph in The Matrix franchise. Prior to 1996, he was credited under the stage name Ngai Sing (倪星).

== Early life and education ==
Chou was born in Kaohsiung in 1967, to a military family with roots in Guangdong. He began training in taekwondo and muay thai as a child. He studied at Los Angeles Pierce College in the United States.

== Career ==
After serving in the Taiwanese Army, Chou moved to Hong Kong at age 20 and joined Sammo Hung's stunt team. He played a supporting role opposite Hung in Encounters of the Spooky Kind II (1990). Until 1996, Chou used the stage name Ngai Sing (倪星).

Chou is best known in the United States for his portrayal of Seraph in the films The Matrix Reloaded and The Matrix Revolutions, and in the video game Enter the Matrix.

In Asian cinema, Chou has co-starred with Jet Li, Donnie Yen and Sammo Hung in martial arts films such as Fearless (2006), and Flash Point (2007). He is also known for playing the antagonist Shang Wei in Hail the Judge (1994), which starred Stephen Chow and "Jade Warlord" in The Forbidden Kingdom (2008), which starred Jet Li and Jackie Chan. Collin Chou starred in Alice Wu's The Half of It as Leah Lewis's father.

== Personal life ==
Chou married actress Wanda Yung in 1999. He has three children.

In addition to his native Mandarin, he also speaks English and Cantonese.

== Filmography ==
| Year | Title | Role | Notes |
|---|---|---|---|
| 1987 | Promising Young Boy | Chopin | |
| 1988 | Shy Spirit | Sing | |
| 1989 | Into the Fire | Chou Hsiao-lung | |
| 1990 | Encounter of the Spooky Kind II | Snakeman | |
| 1990 | License to Steal | Yang Chuan-kuang | |
| 1991 | Slickers Vs. Killers | Ai | |
| 1992 | Banana Spirit | Che | |
| 1992 | Lover's Tear | Inspector Chung Ao | |
| 1993 | Exorcist Master | Star | |
| 1993 | Blade of Fury | Siu Chuen | |
| 1993 | Kung Fu Cult Master | Ching Su | |
| 1994 | Hail the Judge | Shang Wai | |
| 1994 | Return to a Better Tomorrow | Holland Boy | |
| 1994 | The Bodyguard from Beijing | Killer Wong | |
| 1994 | Ashes of Time | Swordsman | |
| 1995 | Don't Give a Damn | Siu Loon | |
| 1995 | My Father Is a Hero | Kwong's man | |
| 1995 | Teenage Master | Sek Lung | |
| 1995 | The Red-Wolf | Tong San | |
| 1995 | Drugs Fighters | Li Fan | |
| 1995 | Thunderbolt | Kong's Thug with Red Bandana | |
| 1995 | The Blade | Fast Saber | |
| 1996 | Dr. Wai in "The Scripture with No Words" | The Movie Star | |
| 1996 | War of the Under World | Scum | |
| 1996 | God of Gamblers 3: The Early Stage | Wolf | |
| 1997 | Passion | | |
| 1997 | 97 Aces Go Places | Police Special Force | |
| 1997 | Challenge | | |
| 1997 | The Death Games | Long | |
| 1998 | Tie Break | | |
| 1998 | Rumble Ages | | |
| 1998 | The Group | Yip Kai-foon | |
| 1998 | I Shoot Myself | | |
| 1998 | Fist of Mercy | | |
| 1999 | Untouchable Lady | | |
| 1999 | Final Judgement | | |
| 1999 | Black City | | |
| 1999 | Immortal Spirit | Lai's brother | |
| 1999 | Temptation of an Angel | Roy | |
| 1999 | Night Club | Kao | |
| 1999 | The Victim | Shing | |
| 2000 | Two Courageous Ghosts | Siu Hark | |
| 2000 | Hector | | |
| 2000 | Tricky Guys | | |
| 2000 | Tequila Sunrise | Rocky | |
| 2001 | The Vampire Combat | Wuchie | |
| 2002 | Stunt Couple | | |
| 2002 | No Problem 2 | Ben | |
| 2003 | Roaring Dragon Bluffing Tiger | Hui Hong | |
| 2003 | The Matrix Reloaded | Seraph | |
| 2003 | The Matrix Revolutions | Seraph | |
| 2005 | American Fusion | Tony | |
| 2006 | Fearless | Huo Endi | |
| 2006 | The Duel | Yuen | |
| 2006 | DOA: Dead or Alive | Hayate | |
| 2007 | Flash Point | Tony | |
| 2008 | The Forbidden Kingdom | Jade Warlord | |
| 2008 | Nuptials of the Dead | Monk | |
| 2010 | City Under Siege | Zhang Dachu | |
| 2010 | Kung Fu Wing Chun | Kam Ying | |
| 2011 | Mural | Meng Longtan | |
| 2012 | The Four | Tie Shou | |
| 2013 | Badges of Fury | Chen Hu | |
| 2013 | Special ID | Xiong | |
| 2013 | Angel Warriors | | |
| 2013 | The Four II | Tie Shou | |
| 2014 | Ameera | Lao Q | |
| 2014 | The Four III | Tie Shou | |
| 2016 | Super Bodyguard | | |
| 2016 | God of War, Zhao Yun | Li Rending | |
| 2018 | Gatao 2: Rise of the King (zh) | Liu Jan | Taiwanese film |
| 2019 | Battle of Golden Triangle | | |
| 2019 | Buddha Palm Technique | | |
| 2020 | The Half of It | Edwin Chu | |
| 2021 | Crazy Fist | | |
| 2021 | The Curse of Turandot | Zhou Da | |
| 2022 | Ne Zha | | |
