= School on Fire =

1988 Hong Kong film by Ringo Lam

- Film poster
- Directed by: Ringo Lam
- Written by: Nam Yin
- Produced by: Karl Maka; Catherine S. K. Chang
- Starring: Sarah Lee; Damian Lau; Fennie Yuen; Lam Ching-ying; Roy Cheung
- Cinematography: Joe Chan
- Edited by: Cinema City Editing Unit; Tony Chow
- Music by: Lowell Lo
- Production company: Cinema City
- Distributed by: Cinema City
- Release date: 20 August 1988 (Hong Kong)
- Country: British Hong Kong
- Language: Cantonese
- Box office: HK$13,737,107

School on Fire
- Traditional Chinese: 學校風雲
- Literal meaning: School Wind and Cloud
Transcriptions
Yue: Cantonese
- Jyutping: hok6 haau6 fung1 wan4

School on Fire (學校風雲) is a 1988 Hong Kong action film directed by Ringo Lam. The film involves a young schoolgirl Chu Yuen Fong (Fennie Yuen) who becomes caught in a tragic stranglehold of triad activity after she testifies over a triad beating. When this news reaches the triad leader Brother Smart (Roy Cheung), Yuen Fong must pay him protection money for what she has done as events begin to escalate.

== Cast ==
- Fennie Yuen Kit-Ying as Chu Yuen Fong
- Sarah Lee Lai-Yu as Sandy Kwok Siu-Chun
- Damian Lau as Wan
- Lam Ching-ying as Brother Hoi
- Roy Cheung as Brother Smart
- Terrence Fok Shui-Wah as Howard / "Scar"
- Joe Chu Kai-Sang as Lau Yong / "Sa-Pei"
- William Ho Ka-Kui as "Happy"
- Victor Hon as Chu Man-hung
- Tommy Wong Kwong-Leung as Chuen Ngor
- Chan Lap-Ban as Sandy's grandmother
- Li Kwong-Tim as Sandy's father
- Cheung Lui as Brother Shing
- Frankie Ng Chi-Hung as Brother Tin-chiu
- Ricky Ho Pui-Tung as George Chow

== Uncut version ==
The theatrical version was edited with many scenes censored in order to be released publicly in both Hong Kong and Taiwan. The uncut version can be only found on the Tai Seng VHS Video Release from Rainbow Audio & Video Co.

== Awards ==
The film won actress Sarah Lee the award for Best Supporting Actress at the 8th Hong Kong Film Awards.
