= Lam Ching-ying =

Hong Kong stuntman, actor, and director (1952–1996)

- 林正英
- Lam Ching-ying
- Born: Lam Gun-bo (林根寶); 27 December 1952; British Hong Kong
- Died: 8 November 1997 (aged 44); St Teresa Hospital, Kowloon City, Hong Kong
- Occupations: Actor, Martial artist, Film director and Producer, Action choreographer
- Years active: 1970–1996
- Spouse: Cheng Bing Bing (m. 1983; div. 1988)
- Partner: Kingdom Yuen (1995–1996)
- Children: Lam Sik-nga (daughter); Lam Ka-yiu (son)
- Awards: Hong Kong Film Awards – Best Action Choreography; 1983 Prodigal Son (Won); 1984 Winners and Sinners (Won); 1986 My Lucky Stars (Nominated); Best Supporting Actor; 1985 Mr. Vampire (Nominated)

Chinese name
- Chinese: 林正英
Transcriptions
Standard Mandarin
- Hanyu Pinyin: Lín Zhèngyīng
Yue: Cantonese
- Jyutping: Lam^{4} Zing^{3} jing^{1}

Lam Gun-bo
- Traditional Chinese: 林根寶
- Simplified Chinese: 林根宝
Transcriptions
Standard Mandarin
- Hanyu Pinyin: Lín Gēnbǎo
Yue: Cantonese
- Jyutping: Lam^{4} Gan^{1}bou^{2}

Lam Ching-ying (Chinese: 林正英; Jyutping: lam4 zing3 jing1; born Lam Gun-bo (林根寶); 27 December 1952 – 8 November 1997) was a Hong Kong stuntman, actor, martial artist and action director. As a practitioner of martial arts Lam starred in a number of notable films that found recognition outside Hong Kong including Encounters of the Spooky Kind, The Prodigal Son, Heroes Shed No Tears, and his best-known role in Mr. Vampire.

== Biography ==
=== Childhood years ===
He was born Lam Gun-bo (林根寶) on 27 December 1952 in the year of the Dragon, in Hong Kong. His family originated from Shanghai, in the People's Republic of China. Both of his parents made a living by doing catering services. Lam was the third child of six children. His family was poor, and his parents weren't educated. Lam attended Shun Yi Association Elementary School in Hong Kong, but eventually dropped out after 2 years. His father sent him to Chun Chau Drama Society to learn the Peking Opera style under the guidance of Madame Fan Fok-fa.

Due to his slender and fragile body structure, Lam specialized in female roles and often performed stunt-doubling for actresses. However, he was reported as a mischievous and disobedient child. Thus, after half a year of training, Madame sent him on stage to express himself and control his drive. Lam's first show was called "White Beach", but his Beijing Opera career only lasted for 5 years. He realized that there was not much demand for opera styles anymore. Through a friend's introduction, Lam joined the film industry.

=== Early life ===
At age 17, Lam became a stuntman and martial arts coach at the Shaw Brothers Studio. Due to his slender build, he was often called upon to substitute female actors. He received HK$60 a day, HK$20 of which went to his master, and another HK$20 he took home to his parents. Lam used the remaining money to treat his brothers to snacks. Lam once mentioned those were his happiest days in his life.

There was a story that Lam challenged Bruce Lee in a hotel room because he didn't believe Lee was as strong as the rumors said. Lam put a pillow over his chest and stomach, then Bruce struck the pillow and sent him flying across the room. Bruce Lee was so impressed that he hired Lam as his personal assistant. Lam was 19 at the time.

Lam started to work as an co-action choreographer, and personal assistant to Bruce Lee on Lee's movies including The Big Boss, Fist of Fury, Enter the Dragon, Way of the Dragon, and Game of Death. In his youth, Lam seemed to have quite a temper and always got into fights. During the filming of The Big Boss, Lam was arrested for fighting, and Lee had to bail him out of jail.

Despite having little education, Lam impressed Lee with interesting philosophical discussions. Although they hardly talked about their relationship, Lee liked good conversations, and this self-willed young man soon became Lee's favorite.

When Lee died, Lam was devastated. He later joined Hung's stuntman association (known as the Hung Kar Pan).

=== 1980s ===
Lam worked behind the camera as assistant director and became Sammo Hung's right-hand man of the stunt team. His talent as an actor and martial artist was revealed in The Magnificent Butcher. Lam played the fan-wielding assassin who fought against Yuen Biao.

In 1982, Lam won the Hong Kong Film Award for Best Action Director, in the film Prodigal Son. Lam played the strict kung fu master Leung Yee-tai.

He also played a frail, elderly Taoist priest in The Dead and the Deadly (1983).

Lam's star did not rise until 1985, with the release of Mr. Vampire, the movie that fueled the hopping vampire genre. Lam was nominated for Best Actor for his role as the Taoist priest. The character was an engaging mixture of naivety and stoic authority, and became a favorite for audiences. Lam was to reprise this role many times throughout his career.

In the following years, Lam starred as the Taoist Priest in countless sequels and spin-offs of Mr. Vampire such as Mr. Vampire II (1986), Mr. Vampire III (1987), Vampire Vs. Vampire (1989), Magic Cop (1990), Encounters of the Spooky Kind II (1990)

He also appeared in different movie genres such as The Return of Pom Pom (1984), School on Fire (1988), Painted Faces (1988), and Her Vengeance (1988).

In 1989, Lam directed his first movie Vampire Vs. Vampire. The movie starred him as the usual One Eyebrow Priest, Chin Siu Ho and Liu Fong as his naughty disciples. Due to the production cost going over budget, he didn't take his director's fee. The movie showed light of his moving-making style which was prone to realistic fights and dark humor.

=== 1990s ===
The success of Mr. Vampire eventually became burdensome on Lam, who found himself typecast in the role. As the Hong Kong movie industry began to experience a decline, quality roles for Lam also began to dry. However, he continued to take on his usual role as the Taoist priest as well as supporting roles in low budget movies.

In 1990, Lam became the film producer for Magic Cop (1990). He starred in and action directed the movie.

Some of his other ghost movies during these years are Crazy Safari (1991), An Eternal Combat (1991), The Ultimate Vampire (1991) Spiritual Trinity (1991), Mad Mad Ghost (1992), Banana Spirit (1992). Again, his serious acting side can be seen in Pom Pom and Hot Hot (1992), Lover's Tear (1992).

In 1995, although the film market was in depression, ATV offered Lam the starring role in a television series called Vampire Expert (殭屍道長). He was hired with a million HK dollars salary to work in the series. It was a far cry from his time as HK$60 a day stuntman. The series was a success and revived Lam's career. The story followed Mo Siu Fong (Lam Ching Ying) who destroyed ghosts and saved the day. During the filming, Lam developed a relationship with his co-star Kingdom Yuen. In the series, Yuen played a female priest who fell in love with Mo Siu Fong (Lam Ching Ying). At the end of the filming, they were actually in love.

The second series was filmed and aired in 1996. The series starred Lam Ching Ying again as the humble priest, Mang Hoi, Frankie Lam and Annie Man as his disciples. Like the first series, the second series received high ratings and support from China, Hong Kong and Taiwan.

Soon after that, Lam signed for another TV series called Coincidentally (情定阴阳界). The series borrowed the cast of Vampire Expert and had Lam in a supporting role. Lam played a priest who tried to prevent a man from becoming a cruel spirit. However, this series didn't mark the end of his career. Lam's last role was in A Monk at Thirty (一枝花和尚).

In 1996, production on the third series of Vampire Expert began. The production was halted due to Lam's health condition.

== Family ==
During the filming of Vampire Expert in 1995, Lam and his co-star Kingdom Yuen developed a relationship. However in 1996, Lam broke up with Yuen when they were in love. He then packed up and moved to his sister's house. Yuen talked about Lam after his death:

"In fact, he was sick. I always knew it. But he didn't want to be disturbed, so he moved to a place where no-one could see him. He also didn't allow me to visit him. Before leaving, he said: "I cannot stay by your side anymore. Take good care of yourself. If you have problems, ask your brother to help you." I was reluctant to let him leave, but I respected his choice. He was the kind of man that when he decided something, it would be impossible to stop him... As an actor, he wanted people to see the most beautiful, brilliant moments. He didn't allow me to visit him. Because he knew that if I had seen him like this, it would have been very painful".

== Death ==
=== Rumor about cancer ===
During the summer of 1997 Lam had been repeatedly going to the hospital for tests. Rumours were spreading that he had liver cancer. He stubbornly insisted on leaving the hospital immediately and finishing his job, unwilling to be hospitalised. He received worried phone calls from friends, but he told them not to listen to gossip.

It is unknown when Lam was diagnosed with cancer for the first time since he forbid his close family to reveal his illness. Some of his close friends stated that they noticed his illness, but no-one dared to ask him directly. Chin Kar Lok said in an interview:

"One time I had to break through a 10 ft glass wall and before that, I had to work on a ship to jump from the 2nd floor to the 1st floor. Everyone knew it was a painful shot. Hung Kam Bo wanted me to do that job. But Lam refused to let me do that and he took that action…it was really a big pain shot. He was hurt after he did that shot. Like what I said before, working as a stuntman in the 80s is like a family and there is no selfishness.

He was very kind to me, even in a later movie, he found me for the main actor. He really took care of me. He had the spirit. He was not a smooth talker. But he used his brain a lot. He taught us not to be lazy, to give 100% every time, no tricks. He set a very good example to us. He had a good heart for movies, even when he was sick at the end of his life. He didn't show to us he was in pain. He was even shooting a movie with us. I think he is really the real hero. I miss him very much."

=== Final weeks ===
Lam broke up with his girlfriend Kingdom Yuen. Two weeks before his death, Lam moved to his sister's house. He refused visits from his children and friends. Lam started to lose his consciousness over and over again at the beginning of November. His family moved him to the St. Teresa's Hospital in Kowloon. He was already in a semi-comatose state, and his situation gradually declined.

Lam died on November 8, 1997, at 12:30 am, at St. Theresa's Hospital in Hong Kong, at age 44, the cause of death being cancer of the liver. Ricky Hui who was Lam's partner in "Mr. Vampire", died on November 8, 2011, the same date, 14 years later.

=== The funeral ===
Lam's request was to have a low-profile funeral. His funeral was attended by his parents, close family and school-mate friends. The Buddhist ceremony was held in the evening of the 13th at around 7 pm. His Priest robe, shoes and top-hat were buried with him, along with his favorite clothes and sunglasses. Lam's pallbearers were Yuen Shiu Hung, Chin Yuet Sun, Ng Ming Hoi, Lam King Chu, Chan Wui Ngai, Chung Fat, Sammo Hung, Chan Wing Hong, Chin Kar Lok and Wu Ma.

After the funeral his remains were cremated and buried in the U.S. with a calligraphy:

"One Smile Returns To The West"

=== Tribute ===
The first series of My Date with a Vampire produced by ATV was dedicated to him, and the entire series was loosely based in the future of Vampire Expert.

== Filmography ==
=== Film ===
Year	Title	Role	Actor	Notes
1969	The Whirlwind Knight		Yes	
1970	The Golden Knight	Shaolin Monk at temple	Yes	
1970	Brothers Five	Minor Role	Yes	
1970	Wrath of the Sword	Minor Role	Yes	
1971	The Invincible Eight	Whip-wielding henchman	Yes	
1971	Six Assassins	Lord Li's soldier	Yes	
1971	The Blade Spares None	Prince's fighter	Yes	
1971	The Golden Seal	Thug	Yes	
1971	The Crimson Charm	Crimson Charm thug	Yes	
1971	Lady with a Sword	Minor Role	Yes	
1971	The Big Boss	Ah Yen	Yes	
1971	A Touch of Zen	East Chamber guard	Yes	
1971	The Long Chase	Minor Role	Yes	
1971	The Lady Hermit	Horse thief	Yes	
1971	The Angry River	Minor Role	Yes	
1972	Fist of Fury	Susuki's student	Yes	
1972	The Casino	Casino thug	Yes	
1972	The Way of the Dragon	Thug	Yes	Uncredited
1972	The Deadly Knives	Japanese	Yes	
1972	Hapkido	Black Bear student	Yes	Uncredited
1972	The Imperial Swordsman	Bandit	Yes	
1972	The Thunderbolt Fist	Japanese fighter on stage	Yes	
1972	The Fugitive	Ma's thug	Yes	
1972	Treasure Castle		Yes	
1973	A Man Called Tiger	Blue Shirt thug	Yes	
1973	Iron Bull	Thug	Yes	
1973	Seaman No 7	Golden Hair's thug	Yes	
1973	None But the Brave	Masked patriot	Yes	
1973	The Rendezvous of Warriors	Minor Role	Yes	
1973	Enter the Dragon	Guard / Chief double for Sek Kin	Yes	Uncredited
1973	Tiger	Japanese	Yes	
1973	Bruce Lee, the Man and the Legend	Himself	Yes	
1973	Back Alley Princess	Rascal	Yes	
1973	When Taekwondo Strikes	Japanese	Yes	
1974	The Skyhawk	Woodland attacker	Yes	Uncredited
1974	Chinatown Capers	Gangster	Yes	
1974	Dynamite Brothers	Thug in white	Yes	
1974	Yellow Faced Tiger	Slaughter's man	Yes	
1974	Tornado of Pearl River	Minor Role	Yes	
1974	Bloody Ring		Yes	
1974	The Sharp Fists in Kung Fu			
1975	The Man from Hong Kong	Minor Role	Yes	Uncredited
1975	The Spiritual Boxer	Ruei's thug	Yes	
1976	Hot Potato	Leopard Man		Uncredited
1976	Challenge of the Masters	Master Pang's student	Yes	
1976	Bruce's Deadly Fingers	Brown Shirt Fighter	Yes	
1976	End of the Wicked Tigers	Villager	Yes	
1977	Executioners from Shaolin	Pai Mei's monk	Yes	Uncredited
1977	The Shaolin Plot	Soldier	Yes	
1977	The Pilferer's Progress	Hitman	Yes	
1977	Judgement of an Assassin	Bai Du Clan member	Yes	
1977	The Iron Fisted Monk		Yes	Brief cameo
1977	The Sentimental Swordsman	Yun's man	Yes	
1977	The Amsterdam Kill	Police Officer	Yes	
1977	Broken Oath	One of Qi's men	Yes	
1977	Money Crazy		Yes	
1977	He Has Nothing But Kung Fu		Yes	
1978	Clan of Amazons	Red Shoe Society's man	Yes	
1978	The Game of Death	Macau fighter	Yes	Uncredited
1978	The Proud Youth	Minor Role	Yes	
1978	Amsterdam Connection	Mr Hung's henchman	Yes	
1978	Kung Fu Stars		Yes	
1978	Enter the Fat Dragon	Fighter on movie set	Yes	
1978	Legend of the Bat	Han's sword troop	Yes	
1978	Warriors Two	Thunder's men / Leung's student	Yes	
1978	Dirty Tiger, Crazy Frog!	One of Panther's men	Yes	
1978	Kung Fu Means Fists, Strikes and Swords	Thug	Yes	
1978	Gee and Gor		Yes	
1979	The Incredible Kung Fu Master	Fu student	Yes	
1979	Knockabout	Casino fighter	Yes	
1979	Odd Couple	Ha (Scarface's fighter)	Yes	
1979	His Name Is Nobody	Wears black wig	Yes	
1979	The Magnificent Butcher	Fan Man	Yes	
1979	Dragon Fist		Yes	
1979	Crazy Partner			
1980	The Victim	Jo Wing's man / double	Yes	
1980	From Riches to Rags	Knife killer	Yes	
1980	By Hook or by Crook	Skinny's hired thug leader	Yes	
1980	Two Toothless Tigers		Yes	
1980	Encounter of the Spooky Kind	Inspector	Yes	
1980	The Killer in White			
1981	The Prodigal Son	Leung Yee-tai	Yes	
1982	The Dead and the Deadly	Uncle Yee	Yes	
1982	Carry On Pickpocket			
1983	Winners and Sinners	Chan	Yes	
1984	Hocus Pocus	Master Sheng	Yes	
1984	Pom Pom	Police Sgt	Yes	Cameo
1984	The Return of Pom Pom	Flying Spider Lo Chien	Yes	
1984	Hong Kong 1941			
1984	The Owl vs Bombo			
1984	Heroes Shed No Tears	Viet Colonel	Yes	
1985	My Lucky Stars	Corrupted HK policeman	Yes	
1985	Those Merry Souls	Tak's father	Yes	
1985	Heart of Dragon	SWAT Commander	Yes	
1985	Mr. Vampire	Uncle Ko / Master Kau	Yes	
1985	Twinkle Twinkle Lucky Stars			
1986	The Millionaires' Express	Bank robber	Yes	
1986	Where's Officer Tuba?	Taoist priest	Yes	Cameo
1986	Mr. Vampire II	Lam Ching Ying / Lin Cheng-ying	Yes	
1986	Rosa			
1987	Eastern Condors	Lieutenant Lam	Yes	
1987	Lai Shi, China's Last Eunuch	Liu Chang-Fu	Yes	
1987	Cold-blooded Man (Naenghyeolja)	Chiang Fu	Yes	
1987	Mr. Vampire III	Uncle Nine	Yes	
1988	Paper Marriage			
1988	Shy Spirit	Taoist Priest	Yes	
1988	I Love Maria	Master	Yes	(Guest star)
1988	School on Fire	Hoi	Yes	
1988	Painted Faces	Wah	Yes	
1988	Her Vengeance	Hung	Yes	
1989	Pedicab Driver	Uncle Sheng	Yes	Cameo
1989	Vampire vs Vampire	One Eyebrow Priest	Yes	
1989	Armageddon			
1990	The Swordsman	Elder Kuk	Yes	
1990	Stage Door Johnny	Liu	Yes	
1990	Goodbye Hero	Frank	Yes	
1990	Magic Cop	Uncle Feng	Yes	
1990	Prince of the Sun	Khenlun	Yes	
1990	Encounter of the Spooky Kind II	Master Jiao	Yes	
1991	Spiritual Trinity	Tien Lung	Yes	
1991	The Ultimate Vampire	Master Chiu	Yes	
1991	An Eternal Combat	The Master	Yes	
1991	Red and Black	Lin Chiang	Yes	
1991	Gambling Ghost	Exorcist	Yes	
1991	Money Maker	Master Chu	Yes	
1991	Crazy Safari	Master HiSing	Yes	
1991	The Tantana	Mud Yuet	Yes	
1991	Slickers vs Killers	Owl	Yes	
1991	Shy Spirit		Yes	
1991	Midnight Conjure	Taoist	Yes	Cameo
1992	Wizard's Curse	Taoist priest	Yes	
1992	Mr. Vampire 1992	Master Lam Ching Ying	Yes	
1992	The Musical Vampire	Uncle Master	Yes	
1992	Skin Striperess	Taoist Lam	Yes	
1992	Pom Pom and Hot Hot	Lam Ho-Yang	Yes	
1992	Painted Skin	Purple monk	Yes	Cameo
1992	Mad Mad Ghost	Uncle Ying	Yes	
1992	Martial Arts Master Wong Fei Hung	Jiubinku Kyoto	Yes	
1992	Banana Spirit	Master Chen Sheng	Yes	
1992	Legend of Wong Tai Sin	Wong Cho Pin [title char]	Yes	
1992	China Dolls	Motorcycle policeman	Yes	
1992	Lover's Tear	Cheng Ying	Yes	
1992	Forced Nightmare		Yes	
1993	The East Is Red	Zither player	Yes	[footage from 'Swordsman']
1993	Rape in Public Sea	Nan	Yes	
1993	Exorcist Master	Uncle Nine	Yes	
1994	The Green Hornet	Uncle	Yes	
1994	The Chinese Ghostbuster		Yes	
1994	Kung Fu Kid		Yes	

=== Television ===
Year	Title	Role	Notes/Ref.
1995-1996	Vampire Expert	Taoist Priest Mo Siu Fong	80 episodes
1996- 1997	Coincidentally	Priest	
1997	A Monk at Thirty		30 episodes

== Awards ==
1983 Hong Kong Film Awards Nominated and won "Best Action Choreography" in Prodigal Son

1984 Hong Kong Film Awards Nominated and won "Best Action Choreography" in Winners And Sinners

1986 Hong Kong Film Awards Nominated for "Best Action Choreography" in My Lucky Stars

1986 Hong Kong Film Awards Nominated for "Best Supporting Actor" in Mr Vampire

== See also ==
- Sammo Hung
- Wu Ma
- Chin Kar Lok
