= Her Vengeance =

1988 Hong Kong film by Lam Nai-Choi

- Blu-ray cover art
- Traditional Chinese: 血玫瑰
- Jyutping: hyut3 mui4 gwai1
- Directed by: Lam Nai-Choi
- Written by: Shirley Woo Suet-Lai
- Produced by: Chua Lam
- Starring: Pauline Wong
- Cinematography: Kwan Chi-Kan
- Music by: Philip Chan
- Production companies: Golden Harvest Productions; Paragon Films Ltd.
- Release date: 7 October 1988
- Running time: 92 minutes (uncut)
- Country: Hong Kong
- Language: Cantonese

Her Vengeance (Chinese: 血玫瑰; lit. 'Blood Rose') is a 1988 Hong Kong film directed by Lam Nai-Choi and starring Pauline Wong. It is a remake of the 1973 rape and revenge film Kiss of Death with elements taken from the 1978 American film I Spit On Your Grave.

== Plot ==
At a Macao nightclub, employee Ying (Pauline Wong) inadvertently angers a group of drunken men who follow Wong after her shift has ended and proceed to rape her. After her traumatic ordeal, her blind sister (Elaine Jin) encourages her to seek revenge leading her to ask former-triad Hung (Lam Ching-ying) for help. Hung gives her a job at his lounge as a waiter and helps her find somewhere new to live, but refuses to help her take revenge. A chance encounter with one of her attackers (Shing Fui-On) gives her the opportunity she was waiting for as she begins to hunt them down one by one.

== Cast ==
- Pauline Wong as nightclub employee Chieh Ying
- Lam Ching-Ying as ex-Triad Hung
- Elaine Jin as Ying's sister
- Sit Chi-Lun as Susan, a friend who works at Ying's lounge
- Kelvin Wong Siu as Ying's would-be journalist boyfriend
- Shing Fui-On as the gang leader
- Billy Chow Bei-Lei as one of Ying's attackers described as bug-eyed
- Hon Yee-Sang as one of Ying's attackers
- Chan Ging as one of Ying's attackers
- Tse Fook-Yiu as one of Ying's attackers
