= Lift to Hell =

- Directed by: Ning Jingwu
- Release date: February 22, 2013 (China)
- Country: China
- Language: Mandarin

Lift to Hell (Chinese: 电梯惊魂) is a 2013 Chinese horror film directed by Ning Jingwu.
