= The Green Hornet (1994 film) =

1994 Hong Kong film by Lam Ching-ying

- Traditional Chinese: 青蜂俠
- Hanyu Pinyin: Qing feng xia
- Jyutping: cing1 fung1 hap6
- Directed by: Lam Ching Ying
- Written by: Barry Jue Wai-Gwong
- Produced by: Lam Ching Ying
- Starring: Chin Ka-lok; Lam Ching Ying; Esther Kwan
- Production company: Sil-Metropole Organisation Ltd
- Distributed by: Sil-Metropole Organisation Ltd.
- Release date: 20 October 1994
- Running time: 88 minutes
- Country: Hong Kong
- Language: Cantonese
- Box office: HK$45,000

The Green Hornet, (Note: simplified Chinese: 青蜂侠; traditional Chinese: 青蜂俠; pinyin: Qing feng xia; Jyutping: cing1 fung1 hap6) a.k.a. Dragon and the Green Hornet, is a 1994 Hong Kong superhero film directed by Lam Ching Ying and starring Chin Ka-lok. Lam Ching-Ying was a respected martial artist and actor who was a close friend of Bruce Lee. The film serves as a tribute to Bruce Lee and the 1960s television series The Green Hornet. The titular hero is a composite character the Green Hornet and Kato, the role originally played by Lee.

In homage to The Green Hornet, the film's protagonist, Dong adopts the Green Hornet name but dresses in Kato's signature attire, including the black domino mask.

== Plot ==
Dong (Chin Kar-lok) is a legacy hero, inspired by the vigilantes of the past, he takes up the mantle of the ancient Green Hornet to continue the fight against crime. As he battles powerful criminal organizations, he crosses paths with Tom (Esther Kwan), a determined female reporter who is not only investigating the masked vigilante's true identity but also becomes involved in his crime-fighting crusade.

== Cast ==
- Chin Ka-lok as Dong/The Green Hornet
- Esther Kwan as Tom
- Yu Rongguang as the police captain
- Lam Ching Ying as Uncle
