= The Chinese Ghostbuster =

1994 Hong Kong film by Wu Ma

- Film poster
- Traditional Chinese: 鍾馗嫁妹
- Jyutping: zung1 kwai4 gaa3 mui6
- Directed by: Wu Ma
- Written by: Chan Ka-Cheong
- Produced by: Leung Tung-Leung
- Starring: Wu Ma; Lam Ching-ying
- Cinematography: Lai Hsi-Chieh; Wu Kuo-Ren
- Edited by: Wong Jing-Cheung
- Music by: Lin Shun-Lang
- Production company: Best Friend Films Limited
- Distributed by: Regal Films Distribution Co., Ltd.
- Release date: 3 May 1994
- Running time: 91 minutes
- Country: Hong Kong
- Language: Cantonese
- Box office: HK $668,018

The Chinese Ghostbuster is a 1994 Hong Kong ghost film directed by Wu Ma and produced by Leung Tung-leung. The film stars Wu Ma himself as well as Lam Ching-ying.

== Plot ==
Ah-May (portrayed by Mondi Yau Yuet Ching) leaves the realm of the dead for the human world in search of a worthy husband. Her older brother, the Taoist deity Chung Kuey (portrayed by Wu Ma), joins her with his underling. Ah-May sets her eyes on Simon, a gigolo (portrayed by Mark Cheng) who is chased by the underworldly siblings and seeks help from a Taoist priest (portrayed by Lam Ching-ying) to exorcise them. Apart from Chung Kuey/Zhong Kui, the following Chinese deities also play a role in the movie: Yanluo Wang and Tudigong.

== Cast ==
- Mondi Yau Yuet Ching as Ah-May 阿妹
- Wu Ma as Chung Kuey 鍾馗, who joins his sister to he human world
- Mark Cheng as Lee Shi-ming 李世民 (a.k.a. Simon), the gigolo that is haunted by the ghosts
- Lam Ching-ying as Chung Jo 鍾九, a Taoist priest
