= The Blade Spares None =

1971 Hong Kong film by Teddy Yip

- Directed by: Teddy Yip Wing Cho
- Written by: Lo Wei; Ni Kuang
- Produced by: Raymond Chow Man Wai
- Starring: Nora Miao; Patrick Tse
- Distributed by: Golden Harvest
- Release date: 1971
- Running time: 102 minutes
- Country: Hong Kong
- Language: Mandarin

The Blade Spares None (Chinese: 刀不留人; pinyin: Dao bu liu ren) is a 1971 Hong Kong action film with sword fighting directed by Teddy Yip Wing Cho and starring Nora Miao, Patrick Tse, James Tien and featuring cameo appearances by Sammo Hung & Jackie Chan.

== Plot ==
Ho Li-Chun, an attractive but powerful swordswoman, fights at a tournament at Prince Kuei's Palace. A knight, Chen Jo-Yu, is defeated but later returns with another knight, Tang Ching-Yun, who is in possession of a peculiar sword. Ho recognizes this as the weapon once used by Sun Tien-Chen, an enemy of her family. Investigating the case, she learns that Prince Kuei was actually murdered, and it is Sun who has assumed his identity as an imposter. Ho, in coordination with Chen and Tang, plan to confront him and eventually attack the palace.

== Cast ==
- Nora Miao as Ho Li-Chun (as Ker Hsiu Miao)
- Patrick Tse as Tang Ching Yun (as Hsien Hsieh)
- James Tien as Chen Jo Yu (as Chun Tien)
- Paul Chang Chung as Prince Kuei (Guest star) (as Chung Chang)
- Feng Yi as Chuang Shih Piao
- Chiang Nan as Kao Wan
- Ng Ming Tsui
- Lee Wan Chung
- Kwan Shan
- Eddie Ko Hung
- Sammo Hung
- Lam Ching Ying as Prince's Fighter
- Wilson Tong
- Jackie Chan as Young Ching Yun (uncredited)
