= Admission by Guts =

- Poster
- 惊魂电影院
- Directed by: Ming Wang
- Starring: Xiaofan Lin; Yiqi Yao; Zhongwei Jiang; Ye Wang; Grace Qiu; Wenze Mei; Yuanyuan Zhao; Tu Hong; Qingbin Yu
- Production companies: Beijing Zhixingli International Entertainment; Xizang Entertainment; Beijing Huanle Wuxian Media; Beijing Huanqiu Jiayi Media; Nanjing Qingzhuo Entertainment
- Distributed by: Beijing G-POINT Film Culture Media
- Release date: June 19, 2015
- Running time: 84 minutes
- Country: China
- Language: Mandarin
- Box office: CN¥8.7 million

Admission by Guts (Chinese: 惊魂电影院) is a 2015 Chinese horror film directed by Ming Wang. It was released on June 19, 2015.

== Cast ==
- Xiaofan Lin
- Yiqi Yao
- Zhongwei Jiang
- Ye Wang
- Grace Qiu
- Wenze Mei
- Yuanyuan Zhao
- Tu Hong
- Qingbin Yu

== Reception ==
=== Box office ===
The film earned CN¥8.695 million at the Chinese box office.
