= Terror Hotel =

- Directed by: Laizhi Zheng
- Release date: August 17, 2012 (China)
- Country: China
- Language: Mandarin

Terror Hotel (Chinese: 恐怖旅馆), also known as Love Motel, is a 2012 Chinese horror film directed by Laizhi Zheng.
