= Exorcist Master =

1992 Hong Kong film by Wu Ma

- DVD cover
- Traditional Chinese: 驅魔道長
- Simplified Chinese: 驱魔道长
- Hanyu Pinyin: qu mo dao zhang
- Directed by: Wu Ma
- Screenplay by: Chiu Lo-Kong; Cheng Man-Wah
- Produced by: Lee Jan-Gei
- Starring: Lam Ching-ying; Wu Ma
- Cinematography: James Wu Kuo-Ren; Che Chang-Gin; Chun Chung-Yin
- Edited by: Wong Jing-Cheung; Chow Tak-Yeung; Liu Woh-Haau
- Music by: Huang Chi-Yuan
- Production companies: Bao Shiung Film & Communication Co. Ltd.
- Release date: 1992
- Running time: 92 minutes
- Country: Hong Kong
- Language: Cantonese

Exorcist Master (驅魔道長 Jyutping: Kui moh do jeung; Pinyin: Qūmó Dàocháng; literally, Expel Demon Taoist Priest) is a 1992 comedy horror Hong Kong film directed by Wu Ma and starring Wu Ma and Lam Ching-ying. It is a spin-off of the 1985 Hong Kong movie Mr. Vampire. Lam Ching-ying reprises his role as a Taoist priest.

In the film, a long-dead priest is revived as a vampire and haunts the church building where he died.

== Plot ==
Priest Wu (Wu Ma) is due to re-open a church after a priest died there twenty years ago, Uncle Nine (Lam Ching-ying) recommends he does not re-open the church but Priest Wu goes ahead. The priest who died there becomes a vampire who wants to turn everyone in the town into a vampire.

== Cast ==
- Lam Ching-ying as Master Chiou (Uncle Nine)
- Wu Ma as Priest Wu
- Collin Chou as Star (Yao-lung Chou)
- Wing-Cho Yip as The Mayor
- Hung Yue as Anny
- Shen Yuen as Priest Shen
- Chia-chun Chen as Yue Liang
- Tzu-yu Yang as David
