= Encounters of the Spooky Kind II =

1990 Hong Kong film by Ricky Lau

- Film poster
- Traditional Chinese: 鬼咬鬼
- Simplified Chinese: 鬼咬鬼
- Hanyu Pinyin: guǐyǎoguǐ
- Jyutping: gwai2 ngaau5 gwai2
- Directed by: Ricky Lau
- Screenplay by: Barry Wong
- Story by: Barry Wong; Sze Mei-yee; Sam Chi-leung
- Produced by: Sammo Hung
- Starring: Sammo Hung; Lam Ching-ying; Mang Hoi; Teddy Yip; Huang Ha
- Cinematography: Barry Wong
- Edited by: Peter Cheung; Keung Chuen-tak
- Music by: Frankie Chan
- Production company: Bojon Films Company Ltd
- Distributed by: Newport Entertainment Limited
- Release date: 9 February 1990
- Running time: 87 minutes
- Country: Hong Kong
- Language: Cantonese
- Box office: HK$13,581,385

Encounters of the Spooky Kind II (Chinese: 鬼咬鬼) is a 1990 Hong Kong martial arts comedy horror film directed by Ricky Lau. It was produced by and stars Sammo Hung, who also choreographed the combat. The film was produced by Hung's production company, Bojon Films Company Ltd. It was released as Spooky Encounters 2 in the US. It is sometimes listed as aka Close Encounters of the Spooky Kind 2 . It's a stand-alone sequel to Encounters of the Spooky Kind and the plot has no relation. The film's Chinese title literally translates as "Ghost Bites Ghost".

== Plot ==
Tea-house worker and martial-arts student "Abao" is to married to his boss's daughter, "Little Chu" and Abao fights to protect her from the advances of the wealthy "Master Shi". The two men's romantic rivalry escalates into a full-scale supernatural battle after Shi enlists the help of a wicked sorcerer, and Abao encounters a benevolent female ghost.

== Cast ==
- Sammo Hung as Abao
- Lam Ching-ying as Master Kau - Uncle Kau to friends
- Mang Hoi as Little Hoi (as Meng Hoi)
- Teddy Yip as Chu
- Wong Man-kwan as Hung (Female Ghost)
- Huang Ha as The Priest
- Tam Sin-hung as Hsiao-hung's Mother
- Collin Chou as Snakeman
- Cheung Kwok-keung as Customer with kid
- Mimi Kung as Little Chu - Bo's Fiancé

== Box office ==
Encounters of the Spooky Kind II grossed HK$13,581,385 at the Hong Kong box office.

== Home media ==
=== VHS ===
| Release date | Country | Classifaction | Publisher | Format | Language | Subtitles | Notes | REF |
|---|---|---|---|---|---|---|---|---|
| 19 June 1998 | United States | Unknown | Tai Seng Video | NTSC | Cantonese | English | | |

=== DVD ===
| Release date | Country | Classifaction | Publisher | Format | Region | Language | Sound | Subtitles | Notes | REF |
|---|---|---|---|---|---|---|---|---|---|---|
| 3 February 2005 | France | Unknown | HK Video | PAL | 2 | Cantonese | Unknown | French | Box set includes Spooky Encounters 1 & 2 under the name Chinese Exorcist 1 & 2 | |
