= Encounters of the Spooky Kind =

1980 Hong Kong film by Sammo Hung

- Hong Kong film poster

Chinese name
- Traditional Chinese: 鬼打鬼
- Simplified Chinese: 鬼打鬼
- Literal meaning: Ghost fighting ghost (an idiom meaning 'infighting')
Transcriptions
Standard Mandarin
- Hanyu Pinyin: guǐdáguǐ
Yue: Cantonese
- Jyutping: gwai2 daa1 gwai2
- Directed by: Sammo Hung
- Written by: Sammo Hung; Huang Ying
- Produced by: Chan Pui-wah; Raymond Chow; Lau Chi-chong
- Starring: Sammo Hung; Wong Ha; Dick Wei; Lam Ching-ying; Wu Ma
- Cinematography: Lee Yau-tong; Ng Cho-wah
- Edited by: Peter Cheung
- Music by: Frankie Chan
- Production company: Bo Ho Films Co Ltd
- Distributed by: Golden Harvest
- Release date: 24 December 1980
- Running time: 98 minutes
- Country: Hong Kong
- Language: Cantonese
- Box office: HK$5.675 million

Encounters of the Spooky Kind (Chinese: 鬼打鬼; pinyin: Guǐ dǎ guǐ; lit. 'Ghost Against Ghost') (Note: The film also has the onscreen title Encounter of the Spooky Kind.) is a 1980 Hong Kong martial arts comedy horror film starring and directed by Sammo Hung, written by Hung and Huang Ying, and produced by Hung's film production company Bo Ho Film Company. Hung stars as Cheung, a rickshaw worker whose wife is having an affair with one of his wealthy clients. His wife and her lover hire a powerful sorcerer (played by Peter Chan) to kill Cheung, who is aided by the sorcerer's colleague (played by Chung Fat).

Released as Spooky Encounters in the United States, the film is also known as Close Encounters of the Spooky Kind, a more blatant mimicry of the title of the film Close Encounters of the Third Kind (1977). Encounters of the Spooky Kind was one of the first Hong Kong-produced action horror comedies; though it was not the first film to feature jiangshi, it popularized the production of films featuring jiangshi, hopping vampires of Chinese folklore. Encounters of the Spooky Kind was followed by a 1990 stand-alone sequel starring Hung and Lam Ching-ying, Encounters of the Spooky Kind II (also known as Close Encounters of the Spooky Kind 2). A soft reboot directed by Dick Wei was filmed in 2016.

== Plot ==
Bold Cheung awakens from a nightmare in which he narrowly escapes two ghosts, who both wanted his body for reincarnation. He is challenged to spend the night in an abandoned house where he must peel an apple in front of a mirror. If he breaks the skin then something bad will happen. Upholding his mantle as the boldest, he accepts the challenge. However, that night, whilst peeling the apple, his friend tricks him. While scolding his friend for the prank, a real ghost appears and snatches Cheung's friend away. The ghost reaches for Cheung, but he cuts its hand off and then quickly shatters the mirror, causing the house to collapse.

The next day, Cheung overhears a story about a promiscuous wife from a sweet tofu seller; he goes to his home to check on his wife and finds two peeping toms outside his door. He scolds them, causing his wife and employer, Master Tam, to hear. Tam escapes, but leaves his shoe which Cheung finds and confronts his wife with. His wife pulls a tantrum and makes Cheung feel guilty.

Master Tam is worried Cheung will find out about the affair, so he hires a Mao Shan witch, Chin Hoi, to get rid of him. When Chin mentions this to his junior disciple Priest Tsui, the latter states that it is against the rules of their sect to harm others; Chin then kicks him out after Tsui declares he won't help him kill Cheung. Cheung is tricked by Chiu Fa Kau (hired by Chin) into spending the night in a temple, but he encounters Tsui who tells him that he must sleep on the roof. Cheung follows his instructions before a coffin in the temple opens; a jiangshi, a hopping corpse controlled by Chin, begins looking for him. Cheung hides in the rafters and under the coffin, but is quickly found under the coffin soon after; the two fight until the sun rises, forcing Chin to move the corpse back into the coffin.

Cheung is tricked into spending another night in the temple. Again he meets Tsui who tells him to collect fifty chicken eggs to throw into the coffin. If he runs out of eggs, he must throw dog's blood over the jiangshi. However, the egg seller puts in ten duck eggs behind Cheung's back. That night, Cheung throws in the eggs when the coffin begins to open and it works. However, when he throws a duck egg inside, the corpse escapes so Cheung fights it until he can no longer hold himself after a while; he thus throws dog's blood onto the jiangshi, which sends Chin flying into the roof and severs his control.

Cheung goes back to town, but an Inspector arrests him for murdering his wife, even though it is a set-up. Cheung is thrown in prison, but escapes by pretending to be sick; he beats up the guards and runs into a forest where he trips over a coffin exposing the corpse within. As Cheung sleeps, it comes to life and mimics his actions before an evil force from a black cat causes it to attack and chase him. Whilst on the run from the corpse, Cheung bumps into the Inspector and his men. Cheung jumps out of the Inspector's way, and the chasing corpse soon collapses onto the Inspector, giving Cheung time to escape.

Cheung meets up with Tsui at the cemetery, who wants to take Cheung as his disciple. As they stop to eat, Chin spies on them and manipulates Cheung's right arm to beat up the people around him and himself. Tsui stops him in a sword fight, and Chin escapes. Meanwhile, the Inspector shows up and sends his men after Cheung. To help Cheung, Tsui uses his magic to manipulate the Inspector's men to fight the Inspector whilst he and Cheung escape. Tsui initiates Cheung as his disciple at an abandoned Taoist altar by drawing talismans onto Cheung’s body. He also gives Cheung his chest undergarment as protection. Meanwhile, Chin sends a vampire after Tsui and Cheung but they defeat it, and Tsui uses his magic to force the corpse to tell them where Chin was hiding.

Tsui and Cheung then go to Tam's house to challenge Chin. Both sorcerers use magic to instill spirits into their disciples. Cheung is possessed by the monkey god and Chin's disciple by the Dragon Taming Arhat. The two possessed apprentices fight with Cheung winning. Chin then forces Master Tam to be possessed with the spirit of Lu Dong Bin and beats Cheung, who is possessed by Hong Hai Er. Using Tam's shoe that Cheung carried on his back, Tsui manages to disarm Tam, forcing Lu Dong Bin out of him, and Cheung kills him. As a last resort, Chin unleash his magic on Tsui, and Tsui is badly burn with Chin's sorcery, having already traded his magic undergarment to Cheung. Just as it seems like Chin is winning, Cheung cuts the legs off his altar. This causes Chin to lose balance, giving Tsui a chance to hit him with magical fire; Chin is set ablaze and falls off his altar to burn to death. However, Tsui is badly hurt by Chin's magic and he too falls off his altar dead.

Cheung's wife steps forward in all the madness and tries to convince Cheung that Tam was about to rape her. However, Cheung is not deceived and he punches her, enraged of her adultery and apparent involvement, then throws her down the floor.

== Cast ==
- Sammo Hung as Bold Cheung
- Chung Fat as Priest Tsui
- Lam Ching-ying as Inspector
- Peter Chan as Priest Chin Hoi
- To Siu-ming as Ah To / Ah dooh / Cocky (3 roles)
- Huang Ha as Master Tam (as Wong Ha)
- Dick Wei as Master Lok
- Cheung Ging-boh as Uncle Fok
- Tai Bo as Adviser Lau
- Yuen Miu as Ah To's friend / Prison Guard (2 roles)
- Pang Yun-cheung as Ah To's friend
- Wellson Chin as Police officer
- Ng Min-kan as Police officer
- Leung Suet-mei as Cheung's wife
- Billy Chan as Cheung's friend
- Fung Ging-man as Peeping Tom
- Ho Pak-kwong as Peeping Tom
- Yuen Biao as Vampire
- Lau Chau-sang as Guard
- Wu Ma as Ah Chiu Fa Kau
- Billy Chan as Driver

== Production ==
Actor-director Sammo Hung conceived Encounters of the Spooky Kind after having heard numerous ghost stories from Hong Kong as well as other countries, like Malaysia and Singapore. In September 2000, Hung said of the film's origins: "We were doing a lot of movies and we wanted something new... I made the movie thinking it would be interesting." He was reportedly discouraged from working on the project by some of his film industry peers who believed that audiences would not be interested in the film's supernatural themes.

== Music ==
Encounters of the Spooky Kind includes excerpts from a section of Music for Strings, Percussion and Celesta, composed by Béla Bartók; it is the same section used in the 1980 film The Shining, directed by Stanley Kubrick.

== Reception ==
=== Box office ===
Encounters of the Spooky Kind grossed $5,675,626.00 HKD at the Hong Kong box office. It ran in Hong Kong theatres from 24 December 1980 to 8 January 1981.

=== Critical response ===
Jackie Chan praised the film's climactic duel in which Cheung is possessed by a monkey-god, describing the choreography as "amazing". Authors Colin Odell and Michelle Le Blanc called Encounters of the Spooky Kind "an almost peerless blend of comedy, horror and kung-fu". In 2014, film critic Andrew Heskins of EasternKicks wrote, "Sammo Hung [...] took the idea of hopping vampires/deceased from The Shadow Boxing (aka The Spiritual Boxer II) and turned it into a phenomenon with Encounter of the Spooky Kind, and things were never the same."

== Home media ==
=== VHS ===
Release date	Country	Classification	Publisher	Format	Language	Subtitles	Notes	Ref.
September 1998	France	Unknown	HK Video	PAL	Cantonese	French		
12 October 1999	United States	R	Tai Seng Entertainment	NTSC	Cantonese	English		
24 January 2000	United Kingdom	15	Hong Kong Legends	PAL	Cantonese	English		
12 November 2001	United Kingdom	15	Hong Kong Legends	PAL	English (dubbed)	None		

=== VCD ===
Release date	Country	Classification	Publisher	Format	Language	Subtitles	Notes	Ref.
1 April 2000	Hong Kong	N/A	Mega Star (HK)	NTSC	Cantonese	English, Traditional Chinese		
6 March 2009	Hong Kong	N/A	Joy Sales (HK)	NTSC	Cantonese	English, Traditional Chinese	Digitally remastered edition, 2 VCDs	

=== DVD ===
Release date	Country	Classification	Publisher	Format	Region	Language	Sound	Subtitles	Notes	Ref.
1 September 2000	Hong Kong	N/A	Deltamac (HK)	NTSC	3 & 6	Cantonese, Mandarin	Unknown	English, Traditional Chinese, Simplified Chinese	Name on box Spooky Encounters	
14 November 2000	United States	Not Rated	Tai Seng Video	NTSC	1	Cantonese, English	Unknown	English		
12 November 2001	United Kingdom	15	Hong Kong Legends	PAL	2	Cantonese, English (dubbed)	Dolby Digital 2.0	English	Digitally remastered edition	
3 February 2005	France	Unknown	HK Video	PAL	2	Cantonese	Unknown	French	Box set includes Spooky Encounters 1 & 2 under the name Chinese Exorcist 1 & 2	
25 February 2005	Korea	N/A	Spectrum DVD	NTSC	3	Cantonese	Unknown	English, Korean	Name on box Spooky Encounters	
5 April 2005	United States	R	20th Century Fox	NTSC	1	Cantonese, English	Dolby Digital 5.1 & DTS	English	Name on box Spooky Encounters	
25 May 2006	Japan	N/A	Universal Pictures Japan	NTSC	2	Cantonese	Unknown	Japanese	Name on box Spooky Encounters, digitally remastered edition	
7 May 2008	Australia, New Zealand	M	Magna Pacific	PAL	4	Cantonese, English (dubbed)	Dolby Digital 2.0	English	Digitally remastered	
2 December 2009	Hong Kong	N/A	Joy Sales (HK)	NTSC	ALL	Cantonese, Mandarin	Dolby Digital 2.0	English, Traditional Chinese, Simplified Chinese	Name on box Spooky Encounters, digitally remastered	
25 December 2012	United Kingdom	N/A	Cine-Asia	PAL	2	Cantonese, English (dubbed)	Dolby Digital 2.0	English	Special collectors' edition, digitally remastered	

=== Blu-ray ===
Release date	Country	Classification	Publisher	Format	Region	Language	Sound	Subtitles	Notes	Ref.
20 November 2012	Hong Kong	N/A	Kam & Ronson Enterprises Co. Ltd.	NTSC	A	Cantonese, Mandarin	6.1, 7.1, DTS-HD Master Audio, Dolby Digital EX / THX Surround EX	English, Traditional Chinese		
21 June 2021	United Kingdom	N/A	Eureka Classics	-	B	Cantonese, English	DTS-HD 2.0, DTS-HD 5.1	English		
