= The Musical Vampire =

1992 Hong Kong film by Wilson Tong

- DVD cover
- Traditional Chinese: 音樂殭屍
- Simplified Chinese: 音乐僵尸
- Hanyu Pinyin: Yin le jiang shi
- Jyutping: Jam1 ngok6 goeng1 si1
- Directed by: Wilson Tong (Wai Shing Tong); Fung Hak-On
- Written by: Wilson Tong (Wai Shing Tong)
- Produced by: Wilson Tong (Wai Shing Tong)
- Starring: Lam Ching-ying; Loletta Lee
- Cinematography: Mok Chak-Yan
- Edited by: Cheung Kwok-Kuen
- Production company: Miao Wei Investment Company
- Release date: 4 September 1992
- Running time: 90 minutes
- Country: Hong Kong
- Language: Cantonese

The Musical Vampire (Chinese: 音樂殭屍) is a 1992 comedy horror Hong Kong film directed by Wilson Tong and starring Lam Ching-ying. It is a spin-off of the 1985 Hong Kong film Mr. Vampire. Lam Ching-ying reprises his role as a Taoist priest.

== Plot ==
A scientist reanimates a corpse with a chemical, creating a Jiangshi. The corpse can only be controlled by the sound of music. Taoist priest (Lam Ching-ying) and his two assistants must stop it before it destroys the countryside.

== Cast ==
- Lam Ching-ying as Uncle Master
- Rachel Lee as Chu-Chu
- Dickson Lee as Ah Hoo
- Stanley Fung as Master
- Charlie Cho Cha-Lee as Captain Tsao
- Xiong Xin-Xin as Ah Keung
- Tai Bo as Little Three
- Wong Chi-Keung as vampire
- James M. Crockett as foreign scientist
