= Magic Cop =

1990 Hong Kong film by Lam Ching-ying

- Film poster
- Traditional Chinese: 驅魔警察
- Simplified Chinese: 驱魔警察
- Hanyu Pinyin: Qū Mó Jǐngchá
- Jyutping: Keoi1 Mo1 Ging2 Caat3
- Directed by: Stephen Tung
- Written by: Sam Chi-leung; Tsang Kan-cheung
- Produced by: Lam Ching-ying
- Starring: Lam Ching-ying; Wilson Lam; Michael Miu
- Cinematography: Cho On-sun; Kwan Chi-kan; Lam Fai-tai
- Edited by: Kwok Ting-hung; Woo Kei-chan
- Music by: BMG Melody Bank
- Production companies: Movie Impact Ltd. Millifame Productions Ltd.
- Distributed by: Media Asia
- Release date: 2 November 1990 (Hong Kong)
- Running time: 87 minutes
- Country: Hong Kong
- Language: Cantonese
- Box office: HK$3,645,000

Magic Cop, also informally known as Mr. Vampire 5, is a 1990 Hong Kong horror comedy film produced by, and starring, Lam Ching-ying. It was released in Hong Kong on 2 November 1990, and in the Philippines on 18 June 1992.

== Plot ==
Uncle Feng, an experienced policeman, lives a quiet and beautiful life in Tung Ping Chau. One day, the old lady living next door comes to ask him to go to Hong Kong Island to return the body of her daughter, a stewardess killed by the police after being suspected of being a drug smuggler. Feng finds that the "stewardess" had actually been killed before her return to Hong Kong. She had been turned into a "living corpse", and is being controlled by a Japanese magician for drug smuggling. With Feng's supernatural skills and detective techniques, they finally find the location of the secret altar of the Japanese magician.

== Cast ==
- Lam Ching-ying as Uncle Feng, police constable and occult expert
- Wilson Lam as Inspector Lam
- Michael Miu as Sergeant No. 2237
- Wong Mei-way as Lin, Uncle Feng's niece
- Michiko Nishiwaki as Japanese magician
- Wu Ma as Senior Superintendent Ma
- Billy Chow as Japanese magician's henchman
- Frankie Chin as Eddie

== Release ==
The film grossed HK$3,645,216 at the Hong Kong box office during its theatrical run from 2 November to 21 November 1990. In the Philippines, the film was released with the same name on 18 June 1992; Lam Ching-ying is credited as Michael Lee.

== Critical reception ==
LoveHKFilm remarked, "The action scenes are fun (as one would expect from Stephen Tung), and the cultural connections are cool-as-can-be."

== Home media ==
=== VCD releases ===
Release date	Country	Classification	Publisher	Format	Language	Subtitles	Notes	Ref.
Unknown	Hong Kong	II	Megastar (HK)	NTSC	Cantonese	Cantonese/English	2VCDs	

=== DVD releases ===
Release date	Country	Classification	Publisher	Format	Region	Language	Sound	Subtitles	Notes	Ref.
20 April 2004	Hong Kong	N/A	Mega Star (HK)	NTSC	ALL	Cantonese, Mandarin	Dolby Digital 5.1	English, Traditional Chinese, Simplified Chinese		

=== Blu-ray releases ===
Release date	Country	Classification	Publisher	Region	Language	Sound	Subtitles	Notes	Ref.
24 July 2023	UK	15	88 Films	AB	Cantonese	Dolby Digital 5.1 / 2.0	English	The Blu-ray includes the film's original master audio Cantonese mono mix, Cantonese home video mix, and English dub versions.	
