= The Ultimate Vampire =

1991 Hong Kong film by Andrew Lau

- Film poster

Chinese name
- Traditional Chinese: 殭屍至尊
- Simplified Chinese: 僵尸至尊
Transcriptions
Standard Mandarin
- Hanyu Pinyin: Jiang shī zhi zūn
Yue: Cantonese
- Jyutping: Goeng1 Si1 zi3 zu1
- Directed by: Andrew Lau
- Written by: Lok Chak-Chi
- Produced by: Wong Ying; Chin Chung
- Starring: Lam Ching-ying; Chin Siu-ho
- Cinematography: Andrew Lau; Tony Miu
- Edited by: Chan Ki-Hop
- Music by: Philip Chan
- Production companies: Ying Din Ying Chai Chok; Eagle Film Production
- Distributed by: Newport Entertainment; Ocean Shores Video
- Release date: 1 January 1991
- Running time: 88 minutes
- Country: Hong Kong
- Language: Cantonese
- Box office: HK$6,631,216

The Ultimate Vampire (殭屍至尊) is a 1991 comedy horror Hong Kong film directed by Andrew Lau and starring Lam Ching-ying and Chin Siu-ho. It is a spin-off of the 1985 Hong Kong film Mr. Vampire, Lam Ching-ying reprises his role as a Taoist priest.

== Plot ==
Master Gau's (Lam Ching-ying) village get overtaken by vampires, so Master Gau and his assistants must join forces to rid their village of the vampires. Master Gau must also take care of his assistants who befriend a ghost.

== Cast ==
- Lam Ching-ying as Master Gau
- Chin Siu-ho as Chou Sheng
- Ronald Wong as Man Choi
- Carrie Ng as Lai
- Shun Lau as Master Shek Kin
- Chi Yeung Wong as Shek Shiu Kin
- Ku Feng as Chin
- Joanna Chan as Mary

== Box office ==
The Ultimate Vampire ran 1 January 1991 - 11 January 1991 and grossed HK$6,631,216.00 at the box office.
