= Bruce Lee, the Man and the Legend =

1973 American-Hong Kong documentary by Wu Shih

- Directed by: Wu Shih
- Produced by: Raymond Chow; Leonard Ho
- Starring: Bruce Lee; Lee Hoi-chuen; Raymond Chow
- Production companies: Golden Harvest (HK) LTD; Concorn Productions LTD
- Distributed by: Golden Harvest
- Release date: 1973
- Countries: United States; Hong Kong
- Language: Mandarin
- Box office: HK$387,273 (Hong Kong)

Bruce Lee, the Man and the Legend (Chinese: 李小龍的生與死, also known as The Legend is Born of Bruce Lee and Year of the Dragon) is a 1973 documentary film directed by Wu Shih, produced by Raymond Chow and Leonard Ho. An co-production, it stars Bruce Lee. A follow-up/reworking of this documentary was released in 1984 under the title Bruce Lee: The Legend, directed and produced by Leonard Ho.

Dedication of the companies for Bruce Lee in the end credits

== Cast ==
- Bruce Lee
- Raymond Chow
- Linda Lee Cadwell
- Wong Shun Leung

== Scenes ==
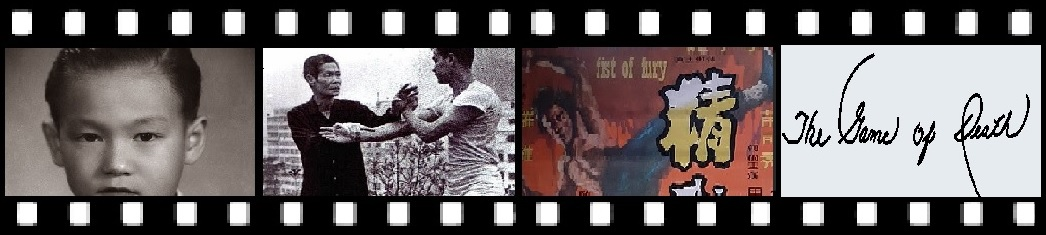
Images from the documentary

- The Funeral of Bruce Lee's Death
- Bruce Lee Filmography
- The first trailer for The Game of Death
