= The Casino (film) =

1972 Hong Kong film by Cheung Chang Chak

- Directed by: Tseng-Chai Chang
- Written by: Ni Kuang
- Starring: Lily Ho, Yueh Hua, Wu Ma, Shih Kien
- Production company: Shaw Brothers Studio
- Release date: March 30, 1972
- Running time: 77 minutes
- Country: Hong Kong
- Language: Mandarin

The Casino (Chinese: 吉祥赌坊; Jixiang Dufang) is a 1972 Hong Kong drama Shaw Brothers Studio film directed by Cheung Chang Chak.

== Overview ==
The film's alternative titles in Hong Kong are Jixiang dufang and Gat cheung do fong. The Casino is a drama martial arts film with characters in a gambling environment. The film is set "in North China soon after the 1911 Revolution". It is one of the three gambling films Chang Tseng-Chai, a Taiwanese director, made for the Hong Kong production company Shaw Brothers Studio. The film has been considered the first notable production in Hong Kong on the topic.

== Plot ==
A handsome stranger, Luo, visits a casino in Northern China. A gambler agrees to help an old friend defeat a crooked gambler that uses rigged dice.

== Cast ==
- Lily Ho - Ms Cui
- Yueh Hua - Luo Tianguang
- Chin Feng - Master Lun Liu
- Wu Ma - Xiao Wang

== Release ==
On March 30, 1972, the film was released in Hong Kong.

=== Home media ===
A DVD version was released in 2004.
