= The Fugitive (1972 film) =

1972 Hong Kong film by Cheung Chang Chak

- Directed by: Cheung Chang Chak
- Written by: Kuang Ni
- Produced by: Run Me Shaw
- Starring: Lo Lieh; Ku Feng; Dean Shek; Little Unicorn; Sammo Hung
- Cinematography: Han Lu Kuang
- Edited by: Hsing-Lung Chiang
- Music by: Fu-Liang Chou
- Distributed by: Shaw Bros.
- Release date: 1972
- Running time: 77 minutes
- Country: Hong Kong
- Language: Mandarin

The Fugitive (Chinese: 亡命徒) is a 1972 Hong Kong film. Siu and Ma are two bandits who ride from town to town robbing banks and killing anyone who tries to stop them. When a hold up goes wrong, Siu is caught, and soon realizes that Ma has kept the money and isn't coming to rescue him.

== Cast ==
- Shao-Hung Chan
- Shen Chan as Lau Lo Sham
- Shao-Lin Chiang
- Chin Chu
- Chun Erh
- Sammo Kam-Bo Hung
- Shih Kien as Master Xi - village leader(as Kien Shih)
