= Ross W. Clarkson =

Australian cinematographer

- Born: 11 January 1963 (age 63); Brisbane, Queensland, Australia
- Occupations: Cinematographer; film director
- Years active: 1995- today
- Spouse: Irina Hadzhieva

Ross W. Clarkson is an Australian cinematographer and film director. He has also been credited as Ross Clarkson, Ross William Clarkson, Law Sez or Law Shut. Clarkson is best-known for Undisputed II: Last Man Standing and Undisputed III: Redemption. Film director Isaac Florentine endorsed him as "an amazing DP (director of photography) and camera operator" who had enabled him to "come up with long takes" of fight scenes.

== Career ==
Clarkson started as a cinematographer for feature films in Hong Kong. Ringo Lam hired him originally for underwater photography and employed him then for following movies. During this cooperation, Clarkson photographed the movie Victim. That earned him the Hong Kong Film Award for best cinematography in 2000. Later, he worked on US-American action films in Bulgaria, but he frequently returned to Asia. 2019 saw him on the other side of the camera, playing an Australian doctor in Thai feature film The Cave. In the same year, he directed Captured, a film about domestic violence based on his own script. For her role in the film, female lead Sara Malakul Lane was elected "Artist of the Year" at the International Film Festival of Ahmednagar in India. The film harvested additional awards at independent film festivals. In 2023, he co-wrote and directed the Kickstarter-financed German-American martial arts film The Last Kumite.

== Selected filmography ==
Year	Title	Director	Notes
1996	The Age of Miracles	Ringo Lam	underwater cinematography
1998	The Suspect	Ringo Lam	
1999	Victim	Ringo Lam	Hong Kong Film Award for Best Cinematography for Ross W. Clarkson
2002	Dead Heat	Mark Malone	
2002	Derailed	Bob Misiorowski	
2003	Marines	Mark Roper	
2003	Looking for Mister Perfect	Ringo Lam	
2005	The Mechanik	Dolph Lundgren	
2006	Undisputed II: Last Man Standing	Isaac Florentine	
2008	Shark in Venice	Danny Lerner	
2009	Direct Contact	Danny Lerner	
2009	Ninja	Isaac Florentine	
2010	Undisputed III: Redemption	Isaac Florentine	
2010	The Blood Bond (also known as Shadowguard)	Michael Biehn	
2012	Assassin's Bullet		
2013	Ninja: Shadow of a Tear	Isaac Florentine	
2015	Wild City	Ringo Lam	His highest rated movie on Metacritic
2016	Never Back Down: No Surrender	Michael Jai White	
2017	Sniper: Ultimate Kill	Claudio Fäh	
2019	General Commander	Philippe Martinez; Ross W. Clarkson	
2019	Vixen	Ross W. Clarkson	direct-to-VOD
2019	Captured	Ross W. Clarkson	also credited as writer
2021	Father Christmas Is Back	Philippe Martinez	
2023	One Year Off	Philippe Martinez	
2023	Bring Him to Me	Luke Sparke	
2024	Hellfire	Isaac Florentine	
2024	The Last Kumite	Ross W.Clarkson	also credited as writer

== Awards ==
Year	Award	Category	Work	Result	Notes
2020	“BLASTOFF” Film Awards	Best Film	Captured	Won	
2020	Guerilla Movie-Making Awards	Best Film / Best cinematography	Captured	Won	
2020	Elevation Indie Film Awards	Spotlight Award	Captured	Won	
2000	Hong Kong Film Award	Best cinematography	Victim	Won	
