= Wu Shu Nao Dong Jing =

Wu Shu Nao Dong Jing (simplified Chinese: 五鼠闹东京; traditional Chinese: 五鼠鬧東京; pinyin: Wǔ Shǔ Nào Dōng Jīng; lit. 'Five Rats Create Havoc in the Eastern Capital') may refer to:

- Wu Shu Nao Dong Jing (novel), a novel from the late-Ming dynasty, which partly inspired The Seven Heroes and Five Gallants
- A major sub-story (roughly Chapters 31–58) of The Seven Heroes and Five Gallants, a 19th-century novel
  - Wu Shu Nao Dong Jing (1927 film), a film based on the novel
  - Wu Shu Nao Dong Jing (1948 film), a film based on the novel
  - The Invincible Constable, a 1992 film based on the novel
  - The Three Heroes and Five Gallants (2016 TV series), a TV series based on the novel

== See also ==
- Justice Pao (1993 TV series) – the last segment is called "Wu Shu Nao Dong Jing"
- The Three Heroes and Five Gallants (disambiguation)
- The Seven Heroes and Five Gallants (disambiguation)
- Justice Bao (disambiguation)
