= Wild City =

2015 Hong Kong-Chinese film by Ringo Lam

- Theatrical poster
- Traditional Chinese: 迷城
- Simplified Chinese: 迷城
- Hanyu Pinyin: Mí Chéng
- Jyutping: Mai4 Sing4
- Directed by: Ringo Lam
- Written by: Ringo Lam
- Produced by: Kenny Chau
- Starring: Louis Koo; Shawn Yue; Tong Liya; Joseph Chang
- Cinematography: Ross W. Clarkson
- Edited by: David Richardson
- Music by: Dave Klotz
- Production companies: Beijing East Light Film Co., Ltd. Oriental Fortune Culture; Beijing Airmedia Film & TV Co., Ltd. Zhujiang Film & Media Corporation Limited; East Light Film Limited; One Cool Film Production Limited iQlYl Motion Pictures (Beijing) Co., Ltd
- Distributed by: Bravos Pictures (Hong Kong); Distribution Workshop (International)
- Release dates: 10 July 2015 (Taipei Film Festival); 30 July 2015 (China); 20 August 2015 (Hong Kong)
- Running time: 105 minutes
- Countries: Hong Kong; China
- Languages: Cantonese; Mandarin; Taiwanese
- Box office: US$24.82 million

Wild City (迷城) is a 2015 action film directed by Ringo Lam and starring Louis Koo, Shawn Yue, Tong Liya and Joseph Chang. A Hong Kong-Chinese co-production, it was released on 30 July 2015 in China and on 20 August 2015 in Hong Kong. It is Lam's first feature film since 2007's Triangle.

== Plot ==
Ex-cop T-Man works as a bartender and one night brings a woman home with him when she is too drunk to drive. The next day she is locked out of her car so T-Man's half brother Siu-hung, a tow truck driver, comes to help, but at that moment a group of men kidnap her. Siu-hung and T-Man pursue them separately and save Yun. They discover that Yun is carrying money that was intended to be used for a bribe. T-Man returns the money, but the gangsters continue to pursue Yun and end up kidnapping Siu-hung's mother Mona. They make a deal to exchange her for Yun, and T-Man enlists the help of his former police associates to help rescue his stepmother.

== Cast ==
- Louis Koo as Kwok T-Man
- Shawn Yue as Kwok Siu-hung
- Tong Liya as Yun
- Joseph Chang as Blackie
- Michael Tse as George
- Yuen Qiu as Mona
- Sam Lee as Yan
- Philip Ng as Kwan
- Philip Keung as Kuen
- Alex Lam as Gei
- Simon Yam as Wong
- Jack Kao as King
- Marc Ma as Leung Ho
- Tam Ping-man as Big Boss

== Production ==
In 2014, the Hong Kong newspaper Apple Daily reported that director Ringo Lam would return to directing with an investment from the Mei Ah Entertainment Group with production set to being in June.

On the first day of filming, Lam collapsed due to a heat stroke. He stayed with the project to keep filming. In 2014, the film's titled changed from Hustle to Wild City. Louis Koo has stated that Lam insisted that the actors perform their own stunt work in the film to maintain realism.

Variety reported that Lam was in post-production on the film by 23 March 2015.

== Style ==
Lam described Wild City as belonging to a "City Trilogy" along with the films City on Fire and Full Alert. Lam described them as films that "are all set in Hong Kong and are about people who are lost in the city. In Wild City the theme is about the temptation of money, and how it seduces the protagonists, but also forces them to challenge the plutocracy."

== Release ==
The first trailer was released on 23 March 2015. The film is distributed by Bravos Pictures locally, while international sales are overseen by Distribution Workshop.

The film premiered at the 17th Taipei Film Festival on 10 July 2015. On the film's release in China, it had had approximately 20.2% of all screenings over the weekend, and opened in third place, earning RMB57.4 million (US$9.25 million) from approximately 1.76 million admissions between Friday and Sunday. The film made RMB88.0 million (US$14.2 million) over four days.

== Reception ==
The Hollywood Reporter stated that Wild City paled in comparison to Lam's films from the 1990s, noting that the "screenplay doesn't have the complexity and rich symbolism of Full Alert (1997) and Victim (1999)". The review concluded that "the film is engaging enough to reignite interest in Lam".
