= The Invincible Constable =

- Official poster
- Traditional Chinese: 七俠五義之五鼠鬧東京
- Simplified Chinese: 七侠五义之五鼠闹东京
- Literal meaning: The Seven Heroes and Five Gallants: Five Rats Wreak Havoc in the Eastern Capital
- Hanyu Pinyin: Qī Xiá Wǔ Yì Zhī Wǔ Shǔ Nào Dōng Jīng
- Directed by: Chan Muk-chuen
- Written by: Xi Si
- Produced by: Hsu Wen-hsiung
- Starring: Lin Wei; Li Chih-hsi; Cynthia Khan
- Cinematography: Peng Ta-wei
- Production companies: Fujian Film Studio; Luk Fuk Film Production Company
- Release date: 1993
- Running time: 92 minutes
- Countries: China; Taiwan
- Language: Mandarin

The Invincible Constable is a 1993 Chinese-Taiwanese martial arts comedy film directed by Hong Kong director Chan Muk-chuen, based on the 19th-century novel The Seven Heroes and Five Gallants. The film was shot in Dajinhu National Geopark (大金湖国家地质公园) in Taining County, Fujian, a protected area of China.

== Plot ==
The film is set in 11th-century Song dynasty. Bai Yutang, a young hero nicknamed "Sleek Rat", arrives at the national capital Kaifeng Prefecture to challenge Zhan Zhao (nicknamed "Southern Hero" and "Imperial Cat"), a young constable who works for the incorruptible prefect and judge Bao Zheng. A master of intrusion, Bai Yutang sneaks into the imperial palace at night with ease, but when he tries to leave he only narrowly escapes Zhan Zhao's capture. He returns to his base in Hollow Island and is ambushed and pranked by his sworn brothers Han Zhang ("Earth Rat"), Xu Qing ("Mountain Rat"), and Lu Fang ("Sky Rat"), who throw him into the river to be rescued by the fourth brother Jiang Ping ("River Rat"). After the wacky reunion, the five sworn brothers are visited by Ding Yuehua, a bubbly young swordswoman whose sharp tongue annoys Bai Yutang no end. By continuously praising Zhan Zhao and joking about Bai Yutang's abilities, she successfully provokes Bai into leaving for Kaifeng again.

Meanwhile, Zhan Zhao who is on Bai Yutang's trail has arrived in the mountains surrounding Hollow Island. He meets Ding Yuehua, who immediately takes a liking to him. Ding Yuehua foolishly tries to challenge Zhan Zhao in swordsmanship, and is only rescued by her older brother (or cousin) Ding Zhaohui. Ding Zhaohui invites Zhan Zhao to his estate for a drink, during which Ding Yuehua continues to pester Zhan Zhao. When Ding Zhaohui yells at her, she leaves in a huff.

Bai Yutang arrives in Kaifeng and begins his chivalrous activities. He sneaks into the mansion of the treacherous Imperial Tutor Pang, who is throwing a birthday banquet in which all guests have to eat baozi (to show his hatred for Judge Bao). Imperial Tutor Pang gets drunk and mistakenly kills his two favorite concubines, believing they are cheating on him (it was actually Bai Yutang who imitated their voices). He then counsels with his advisor Liao Tiancheng, who writes a memorial to the throne about the killing, but laying the blame on Judge Bao. Bai Yutang overhears the conversation and begins to set fire. He is stopped by Zhan Zhao, who has come back to Kaifeng, but manages to convince Zhan to join him. During the chaos following the fire, he substitutes Imperial Tutor Pang's memorial with another one offering to donate all his property to charity.

Realizing the rivalry between Zhan Zhao and Bai Yutang, Liao Tianzhang believes he can buy off the "Five Rats" to take their side against Judge Bao. Instead, he gets beaten black and blue by Bai Yutang, Jiang Ping and Xu Qing. Bai Yutang meets Ding Yuehua who again provokes him into action: this time he steals Judge Bao's "Imperial Sword". Just as he is returning to Hollow Island, his four brothers are poisoned in a restaurant by Liao Tianzhang. The four brothers believe Zhan Zhao is the culprit, and a struggle with him ensues. They escape from Zhan Zhao only to fall into the hands of Liao Tianzhang, but Zhan rescues them. Knowing that they are all righteous heroes, Zhan Zhao persuades them to join him under Judge Bao. However, the four brothers are reluctant to go after Bai Yutang, their own brother.

Zhan Zhao meets Ding Yuehua again on his way to Hollow Island. Initially he tries hard to avoid her, but his kind and gentle nature gradually shines through, and they become close during the journey. When they arrive in Hollow Island, they fall into Bai Yutang's trap. Bai Yutang's four brothers refuse to intervene either way, but thankfully Ding Zhaohui comes to the rescue. Having been freed, Zhan Zhao battles Bai Yutang for the sword. At this time Imperial Tutor Pang arrives with a fleet to extinguish all the heroes. Despite his seemingly unbeatable martial arts skills, the heroes work together to kill him. The sword which has fallen into the river is finally retrieved by Jiang Ping.

== Cast ==
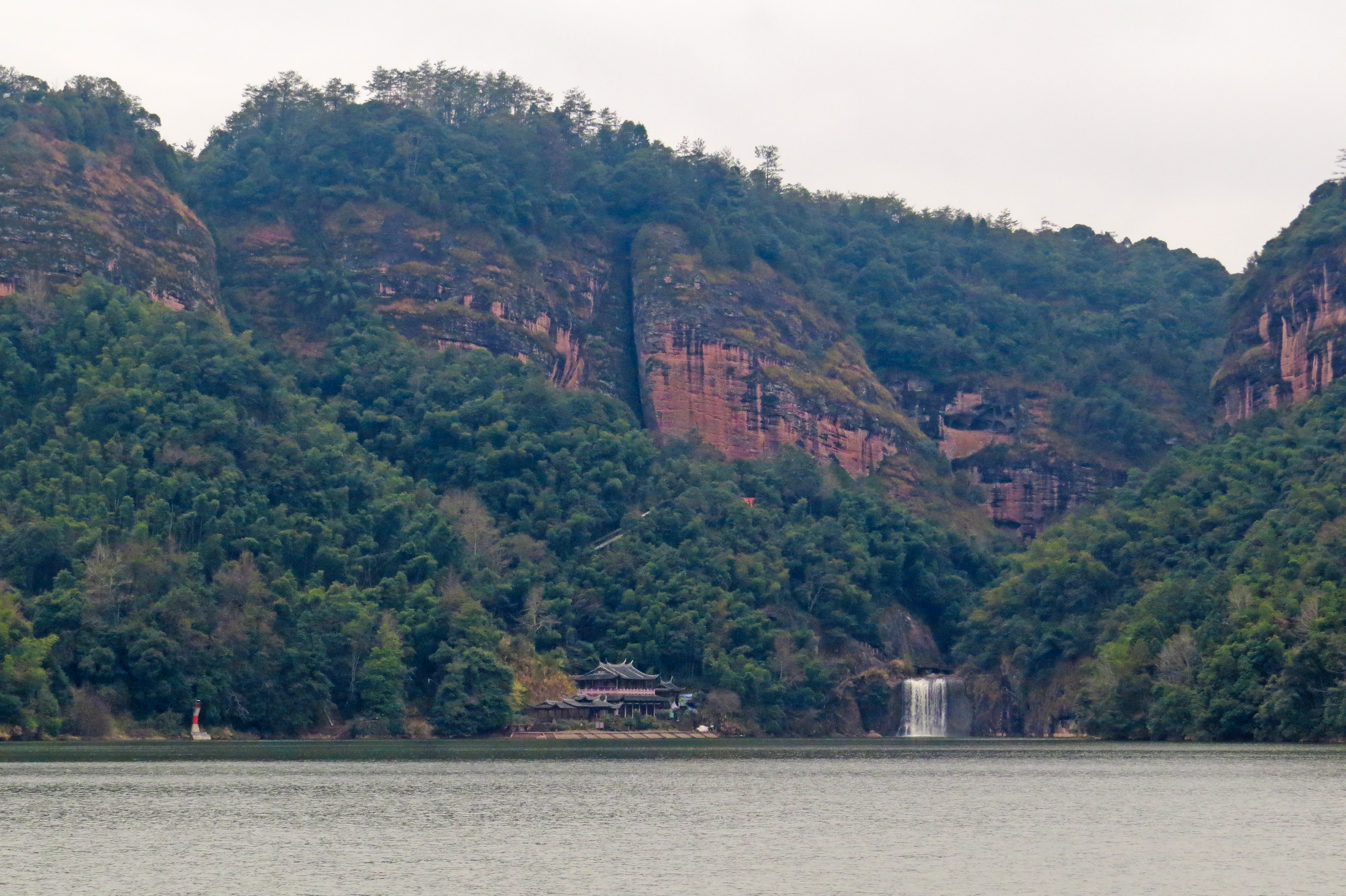
Dajinhu National Geopark in Taining County, where this movie is filmed.

- Lin Wei as Zhan Zhao
- Li Chih-hsi as Bai Yutang
- Cynthia Khan as Ding Yuehua
- Alex Fong as Xu Qing
- Ha Kwok-wing as Jiang Ping
- Shih Chung-tin as Lu Fang
- Mark Cheng as Han Zhang
- Yen Shi-kwan as Imperial Tutor Pang
- Su Jun as Liao Tiancheng
- Anthony Wong as Ding Zhaohui
- Fan Wei as Bao Zheng
