= The Thing You Love Most =

- Once Upon a Time episode
- Episode no.: Season 1 Episode 2
- Directed by: Greg Beeman
- Written by: Edward Kitsis; Adam Horowitz
- Original air date: October 30, 2011

Guest appearances
- Kristin Bauer van Straten as Maleficent; Giancarlo Esposito as The Magic Mirror/Sidney; Tony Perez as Valet; Beverley Elliott as Granny; Meghan Ory as Ruby

Episode chronology
← Previous "Pilot"	Next → "Snow Falls"
- Once Upon a Time season 1

"The Thing You Love Most" is the second episode of the first season of the American fairy tale/drama television series Once Upon a Time. The series takes place in the fictional seaside town of Storybrooke, Maine, in which the residents are actually characters from various fairy tales that were transported to the "real world" town by a powerful curse. This episode centers on Regina's (Lana Parrilla) efforts to run Emma Swan (Jennifer Morrison) out of Storybrooke and reveals how the Evil Queen (Parrilla) unleashed her curse upon the Enchanted Forest.

The episode was co-written by co-creators Adam Horowitz and Edward Kitsis, while Greg Beeman directed. Actress Kristin Bauer van Straten was cast at the last minute and guest starred as the sorceress Maleficent, a character from Disney's 1959 animated film Sleeping Beauty. Mary Margaret's (Ginnifer Goodwin) loft as well as most of the interior shots of the episode were filmed in Vancouver, while many exterior shots were shot in nearby Steveston, British Columbia. Series regular Josh Dallas appears only in archive footage.

"The Thing You Love Most" first aired in the United States on ABC on October 30, 2011. It was watched by an estimated 11.64 million viewers, scoring a 3.9 ratings share in the 18-49 demographic. The episode received generally positive reviews from television critics; many were complimentary towards Emma and Regina's feud and thought the episode was superior to the pilot, but believed Bauer van Straten was underused. A novelization of the episode was published in 2013.

== Title card ==
Starting from this episode, the title card features the Enchanted Forest scenery in tones of indigo and violet, with each episode having an animated identifying character or item that links to the events depicted. For this episode, Maleficent's unicorn gallops through the forest.

== Plot ==
=== In the characters' past ===
At the wedding of Snow White (Goodwin) and Prince Charming (Joshua Dallas), the Evil Queen (Parrilla) announces her plan to cast a terrible curse on everyone. Despite the misgivings of the Magic Mirror (Esposito) and her valet (Tony Perez), she goes to see the sorceress Maleficent (Kristin Bauer van Straten), to whom she had traded a Dark Curse. Maleficent refuses to return the curse, but the Queen defeats her in a magical battle, taking the curse's scroll. She lets Maleficent live, stating that the sorceress is the only friend she has. Later in the forest, the Queen assembles a number of dark creatures. She demands a lock of hair from each of the assembly in order to cast the curse and sacrifices the heart of her prized stallion to complete the spell. The curse, however, fails.

To find out why the curse failed, the Queen turns to Rumpelstiltskin (Carlyle), the original owner of the curse. Rumpelstiltskin offers to help the Queen if, in turn, she makes him a wealthy and respected person in the new world and promises that she will do anything he asks so long as he says "please." The Queen agrees, reminding him that in the new world, they would have no recollection of their agreement. Rumpelstiltskin then tells the Queen that she must cut out the heart of the thing she loves the most and use it to complete the spell. The Queen protests that what she loved most died because of Snow White, but Rumpelstiltskin suggests that there is something else the Queen also loves. He also tells the Queen that he has informed Snow White and Prince Charming that their unborn daughter will be able to break the Queen's curse.

On returning to her castle, the Queen is distraught over what Rumpelstiltskin told her. She confides in her valet, who is revealed to be her father. Knowing he is the thing the Queen loves the most, her father tries to dissuade her from her plan, saying that she could still find love again. Appearing to be persuaded, the Queen pulls her father in for an embrace, then kills him and removes his heart, and immediately starts crying.

Alone in the forest, the Queen uses her father's heart to complete the Dark Curse. As the curse takes shape, she lays a black rose on her father's grave. The headstone bears the inscription "Henry, Beloved Father."

=== In Storybrooke ===
Around Storybrooke, residents notice the clock tower's hands moving. Regina (Parrilla) looks through the book of fairy tales and discovers that the last few pages are torn out. She confronts Henry (Jared S. Gilmore), who lies and says that the pages are missing because it is an old book. Regina learns Emma is still in town when the clock's hands move forward. Believing that Emma Swan (Morrison) will try to take Henry away from her, Regina encourages Emma to leave town. Regina meets with The Daily Mirror editor, Sidney Glass (Giancarlo Esposito), who has run a front-page story about Emma's auto accident (where she crashed into the "Welcome to Storybrooke" sign after trying to avoid hitting a wolf, and was believed to have been drunk driving), which portrays Emma in a poor light, but tells Regina that he has found very little of interest in Emma's past.

Henry tells Emma that he has a plan for them to break the curse, called "Operation Cobra". The first step is to associate his book's characters with each of the Storybrooke residents, as no one can remember their past. Henry explains to a skeptical Emma that she is the daughter of Snow White and Prince Charming. Concerned about Henry, Emma goes to see his therapist, Archie Hopper (Raphael Sbarge). She is willingly given Henry's file, only to be arrested when Archie claims she stole it. Regina unsuccessfully tries to use the incident to divide Emma and Henry. Emma retaliates by attacking Regina's apple tree with a chainsaw, provoking another confrontation.

Back at the inn, Granny (Beverley Elliott) apologetically kicks Emma out, telling her they have a no-felons policy. Regina suggests to Emma that they meet at her office to make peace. Once there, Emma tells Regina that she does not plan to take Henry away, but that she is worried about Henry's sanity because of his "crazy" fairy-tale theory. Henry overhears Emma and runs away, hurt. Regina acknowledges that she knew Henry would arrive just in time to hear their conversation.

Emma later tells Henry that she thinks the curse is crazy, but that does not mean it is not true. She also tells him that in order to break the curse, they must keep Regina off their trail by making her think that they don't believe in the curse.

As Regina tends the apple tree, Mr. Gold (Robert Carlyle) offers to help Regina get rid of Emma, for a price. Regina says that she is not in the business of making deals with him anymore, and Gold acknowledges that she had made a deal with him in the past to procure Henry. He asks Regina how she chose the name Henry; she does not answer. She questions him about Emma's past, and he is equally evasive. When Gold attempts to walk away, Regina presses him for an answer, causing Gold to say "please", forcing Regina to obey. As Gold walks away, Regina watches in shock and worry, suggesting that she suspects that Gold remembers their lives in the Enchanted Forest.

== Production ==
As with the pilot, "The Thing You Love Most" was co-written by series co-creators Edward Kitsis and Adam Horowitz. Smallville co-executive producer Greg Beeman served as director. The episode focuses on the rivalry between Emma and Regina, as each believes they know what is best for Henry. In an interview with TV Overmind, actress Lana Parrilla explained that viewers would see a "vulnerable" side of Regina/The Evil Queen in this episode. Says Parrilla, "What I’ve been trying to show is not the hatred for Snow White, but where it derives from. It’s not so surfaced. That brings a vulnerability to the character. You’ll see into her history and that exposes her in a very vulnerable way as well." As for Regina's troubled relationship with Henry, Parrilla noted that "she may have a cold heart, but I think she really, genuinely loves her son. She doesn’t think of him as an adopted son, she thinks of him as her son."

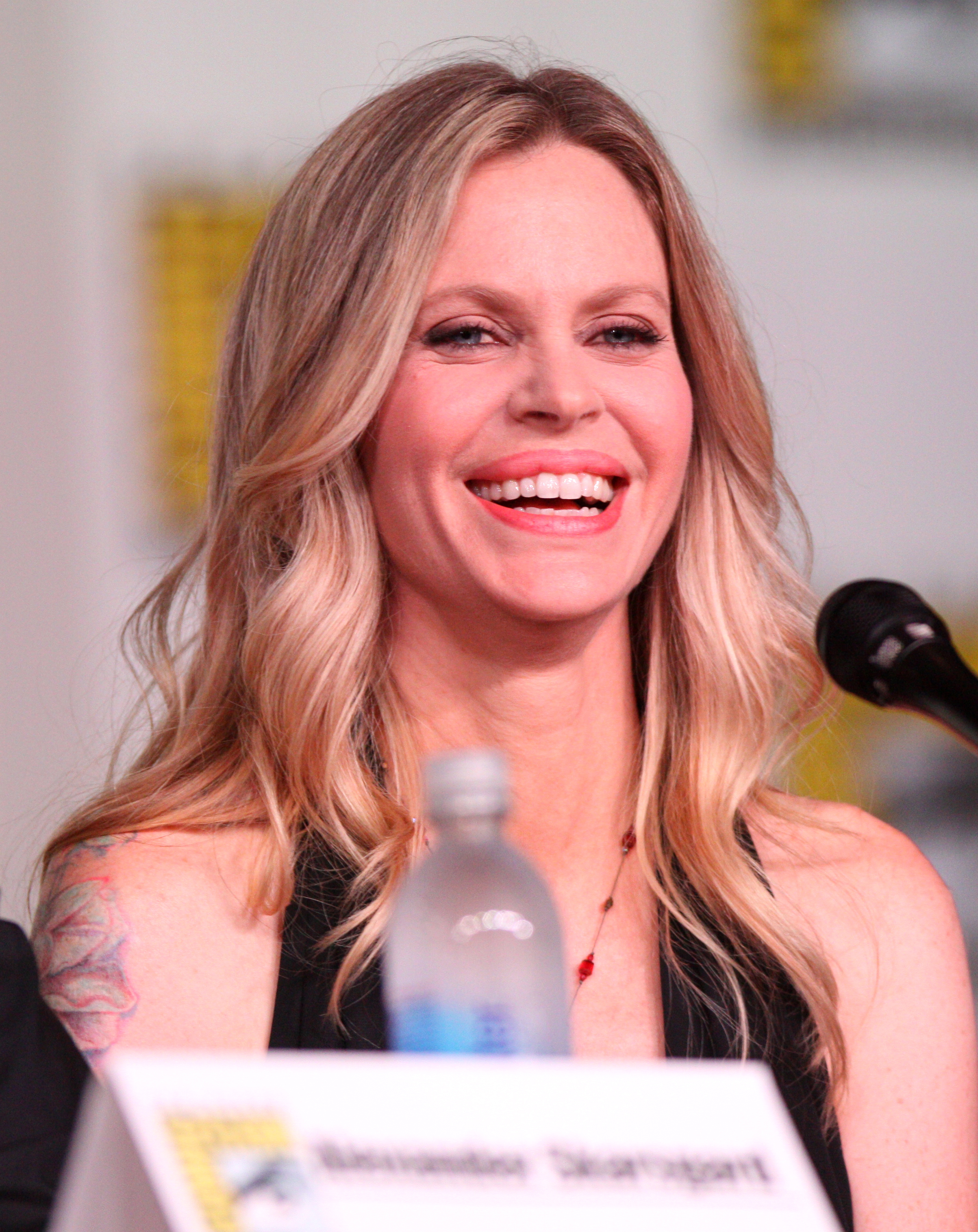
Kristin Bauer van Straten guest starred as Maleficent

In September 2011, The Hollywood Reporter reported that Kristin Bauer van Straten would be guest starring as Maleficent, a character from Disney's 1959 animated film Sleeping Beauty. She was cast at the last minute, which she felt made her performance more instinctual because of the lack of prep time. The actress described Maleficent as being the Evil Queen's "frenemy," as each has been "kind of helping [the] other and playing this chess game for years." Bauer van Straten noted the similarities between Once Upon a Time and her HBO series True Blood character Pam, and said that she enjoyed the "evil-bitch typecasting". She added that the elaborate purple costume helped her get into character, making her feel "slightly evil."

"The Thing You Love Most" is the first episode to feature Mary Margaret's loft, which is filmed on a small sound stage in Vancouver; most of the first season's interior shots are also filmed in the city, while many exterior shots are of nearby Steveston, British Columbia. The production team led by set decorator Mark Lane and production designer Michael Joy designed the residence to seem "locked in time a little bit, so there's not a lot of new stuff." They included working class antiques such as a Hoosier cabinet, an old gas stove, and a Bakelite radio. The loft was meant to be located above a store and near a lumber mill and water, so the crew also designed it to feel like a fish cannery.

The episode was included in Reawakened: A Once Upon a Time Tale – a novelization of the first season – which was published by Hyperion Books in 2013.

== Reception ==
=== Ratings ===
The episode was first broadcast on October 30, 2011. According to Nielsen Media Research, it was viewed by an estimated 11.64 million viewers and received a 3.9 ratings share among adults between the ages of 18 and 49, and even though it was down a tenth from its debut, it retained its lead in its timeslot and was the only ABC show to have the most viewers tuned in that evening. It ranked third in its timeslot behind Football Night In America on NBC and 60 Minutes on CBS but it beat The Simpsons on the Fox network. On November 3, ABC ordered a full season in part based on the success of "The Thing You Love Most", the second episode of the series. In Canada, the episode was watched by an estimated 1.44 million viewers, finishing in twenty-second place for the week.

=== Reviews ===
The episode received generally positive reviews from television critics.

IGN's Amy Ratcliffe rated "The Thing You Love Most" with a score of 7.5 out of 10, describing it as "fun" with "not impressive but not horrible" special effects and a story that was "enjoyable and entertaining but not gripping." Ratcliffe enjoyed the interactions between Emma and Regina, but commented that she "could do with less of Regina's withering stares" and "precious apples." She also found the change of music when switching to the fairy tale realm to be "an unnecessary bat over the head." Cindy McLennan of Television Without Pity graded the episode with an A−. While she liked Bauer van Straten's performance, McLennan wished that her character had been "fiercer" in her first appearance. Entertainment Weekly columnist Shaunna Murphy thought it was more fun than the pilot and praised Morrison's "tough-as-nails-but-with-a-secret-heart-of-gold" performance, as well as her character's feud with Regina.

Writing for The A.V. Club, Oliver Sava criticized the episode for possessing "the same problems as the pilot: It takes itself too seriously, the flashbacks are hilariously campy, and Henry is a horribly obnoxious character in an unfortunately central role." In addition to giving a negative opinion of the episode's CGI, Sava opined that Bauer van Staten was misused and disliked Gilmore's performance, but praised Esposito's. He gave the episode a "C". TV Fanatic's Christine Orlando was more positive, and gave the episode 4.6 out of 5 stars, saying that "The Thing You Love Most" was "a great second outing" for the series. She complimented the production design and applauded the conflict between Emma and Regina, citing her favorite scene as "when Emma took a chainsaw to the Regina's beloved apple tree." Orlando thought that Maleficent was underused and criticized her hair and the scene for its poor special effects.

== Cast ==
=== Starring ===
- Ginnifer Goodwin as Snow White (archive footage)/Mary Margaret Blanchard
- Jennifer Morrison as Emma Swan
- Lana Parrilla as Evil Queen
- Josh Dallas as Prince Charming (archive footage)
- Jared S. Gilmore as Henry Mills
- Raphael Sbarge as Archie Hopper
- Jamie Dornan as Sheriff Graham
- Robert Carlyle as Rumplestiltskin/Mr. Gold

=== Guest Starring ===
- Kristin Bauer van Straten as Maleficent
- Giancarlo Esposito as Magic Mirror
- Tony Perez as Prince Henry
- Beverley Elliott as Granny
- Meghan Ory as Ruby

=== Co-Starring ===
- Patti Allan as Blind Witch
- David-Paul Grove as Doc (archive footage)
- C. Ernst Harth as Ogre
- Layton Keely as Gnome

=== Uncredited ===
- Cinder as Pongo
- Unknown as Floyd
- Faustino di Bauda as Sleepy (archive footage)
- Gabe Khouth as Sneezy (archive footage)
- Jeffrey Kaiser as Dopey (archive footage)
- Lee Arenberg as Grumpy (archive footage)
- Michael Coleman as Happy (archive footage)
- Mig Macario as Bashful (archive footage)
- Tom Pickett as Bishop (archive footage)
