= List of crime films of 1992 =

This is a list of crime films released in 1992.

Title	Director	Cast	Country	Notes
American Me	Edward James Olmos	Edward James Olmos, William Forsythe, Pepe Serna	United States	
Bad Lieutenant	Abel Ferrara	Harvey Keitel, Frankie Thorn, Zoe Tamerlis	United States	
Deep Cover	Bill Duke	Laurence Fishburne, Jeff Goldblum, Charles Martin Smith, Victoria Dillard	United States	
Full Contact	Ringo Lam	Chow Yun-fat, Ann Bridgewater, Frankie Chin	Hong Kong	
Guncrazy	Tamra Davis	Drew Barrymore, James LeGros, Billy Drago	United States	
Hit the Dutchman	Menahem Golan	Bruce Nozick, Eddie Bowz, Will Kempe	United States; Soviet Union	
Juice	Ernest R. Dickerson	Omar Epps, Tupac Shakur, Jermaine Hopkins	United States	
Max et Jérémie	Claire Devers	Philippe Noiret, Christopher Lambert, Jean-Pierre Marielle	France	
Mo' Money	Peter MacDonald	Damon Wayans, Marlon Wayans, Stacey Dash, John Diehl	United States	Crime comedy
One False Move	Carl Franklin	Bill Paxton, Cynda Williams, Billy Bob Thornton, Michael Beach	United States	Crime thriller
Reservoir Dogs	Quentin Tarantino	Harvey Keitel, Tim Roth, Steve Buscemi, Michael Madsen, Chris Penn, Lawrence Tierney	United States	
Swoon	Tom Kalin	Daniel Schlachet, Craig Chester	United States	Crime drama
White Sands	Roger Donaldson	Willem Dafoe, Mickey Rourke, Mary Elizabeth Mastrantonio, Samuel L. Jackson, M. Emmet Walsh, James Rebhorn, Maura Tierney	United States	
