= Ericson Core =

American cinematographer

- Born: Honolulu, Hawaii, United States
- Occupations: Film director, cinematographer
- Years active: 1994–present

Ericson Core is an American cinematographer and film director.

== Early life and education ==
Core attended the Art Center College of Design in Pasadena, California, at age 16, and he then attended USC School of Cinematic Arts in Los Angeles to get a B.A. degree in film production and directing studies.

He received a Master of Fine Arts degree in directing and cinematography, also from the Art Center College of Design.

== Career ==
Core started his career as a music video director and then as a cinematographer for films like Payback, The Fast and the Furious, and Daredevil.

He made his directorial debut with a true-story based sports film Invincible, on which he also remained the director of photography.

In 2015, Core directed the action-thriller film Point Break, a remake of the 1991 film of the same name.

== Filmography ==
=== Film ===
Documentary film

Year	Title	Director	Note
1995	The Show	Brian Robbins	Shared credit with Dasal Banks, Stephen Consentino, John L. Demps Jr., Michael Negrin and John Simmons

Feature film

Year	Title	Director
1996	Exit in Red	Yurek Bogayevicz
1997	One Eight Seven	Kevin Reynolds
1999	Payback	Brian Helgeland
1999	Mumford	Lawrence Kasdan
2000	Dancing at the Blue Iguana	Michael Radford
2001	The Fast and the Furious	Rob Cohen
2003	Daredevil	Mark Steven Johnson
2006	Invincible	Himself
2015	Point Break	Himself
2019	Togo	Himself
2024	Hounds of War	Isaac Florentine

=== Television ===
Year	Title	Director	DoP	Notes
1996	EZ Streets	No	Yes	Episode "Pilot"
1997	Gun	No	Yes	
2000-2001	Family Law	Yes	No	3 episodes
2016	Of Kings and Prophets	Yes	No	Episode "No King Is Saved"
2017	Still Star-Crossed	Yes	No	2 episodes
2017-2021	MacGyver	Yes	No	4 episodes

TV movies

Year	Title	Director	DoP
1997	Before Women Had Wings	No	Yes
2008	The Courier/2.0	Yes	Yes
