= Nishiwaki (surname) =

Nishiwaki (西脇) is a Japanese surname. Notable people with the surname include:

- Junzaburō Nishiwaki (1894–1982), Japanese writer
- Michiko Nishiwaki (born 1957), Japanese actress
- Takatoshi Nishiwaki (born 1955), governor of Kyoto Prefecture, Japan
