= The Avenging Quartet =

1993 Hong Kong film by Stanley Siu

- Directed by: Stanley Siu Wing (as Siu Wing)
- Written by: Matt Chow
- Produced by: Chan Fei-Lung (as Chan Fai Liang); Cheung Kai Ming
- Starring: Cynthia Khan; Moon Lee; Chin Kar-lok; Waise Lee; Yukari Ôshima; Michiko Nishiwaki
- Cinematography: Ally Wong
- Edited by: Cheng Wing-Keung
- Production company: Art Dragon Film Production (HK) Co.
- Distributed by: Mandarin Films Distribution Co. Ltd.
- Release date: 1993
- Running time: 93 minutes
- Country: Hong Kong
- Languages: Cantonese; English
- Budget: HK$10.019 million
- Box office: HK $353,101.00

The Avenging Quartet (霸海紅英) is a 1993 Hong Kong martial arts action crime film directed by Stanley Siu Wing, starring Cynthia Khan and Moon Lee.

== Plot ==
A man flees China with a painting that contains a list of Japanese officials from World War II. His girlfriend (Cynthia Khan) follows him. The Japanese send a woman (Yukari Oshima) to Hong Kong to retrieve the painting, where she is joined by a friend (Michiko Nishiwaki) and they both team up to find him.

== Cast ==
- Cynthia Khan as Chin (as Yeung Lai Ching)
- Moon Lee as Feng (as Lee Choi Fung)
- Chin Kar-lok as Paul (as Chin Ka Lok)
- Waise Lee as Chi Hsiong (as Lee Chi Hung)
- Yukari Ôshima as Oshima (as Yukari Tsumura)
- Michiko Nishiwaki as Sen (as Nishiwaki Michiko)
- James Ha as Sen's Partner
- Mark King as Assassin
- Leung Sam as Uncle Ben
- Hung San-Nam (as Hung Sun Lam)
- Yee Tin Hung
- Lui Tat
- Chim Bing Hei (as Jim Bin Hay)

== Release ==
=== Home media ===
Released in the US as "Tomb Raiders" on VHS in, 2000 by Lion Video as part of their Rings of the Wu Tang series.
