= Close Range =

- Theatrical release poster
- Directed by: Isaac Florentine
- Written by: Shane Dax Taylor; Chad Law
- Produced by: Ehud Bleiberg; Chad Law; Shane Dax Taylor
- Starring: Scott Adkins; Nick Chinlund; Jake La Botz; Tony Perez
- Cinematography: Tal Lazar
- Edited by: Irit Raz
- Music by: Stephen Edwards
- Production companies: Bleiberg Entertainment; Underdogg Entertainment
- Distributed by: Daro Film Distribution; VVS Films; XLrator Media
- Release dates: September 16, 2015 (Polish television); December 4, 2015 (United States)
- Running time: 85 minutes
- Country: United States
- Languages: English, Spanish
- Budget: $3 million
- Box office: $248,979 (Theatrical and VOD)

Close Range (formerly known as Dust Up) is a 2015 American action film directed by Isaac Florentine, and starring Scott Adkins, Nick Chinlund, Jake La Botz, and Tony Perez. The film follows Colton MacReady, a rogue soldier-turned-outlaw, who is forced to protect his sister and young niece from a corrupt sheriff and a dangerous drug cartel who descend upon his ranch for revenge.

The film premiered on Polish television on September 16, 2015. It received a limited theatrical release and VOD release in the United States on December 4, followed by a home video release on January 5, 2016.

== Synopsis ==
Former soldier-turned-outlaw Colt Macready rescues his niece, Hailey, who is kidnapped by drug cartel leader Fernando "El Jefe" Garcia in Sonora, Mexico. Colt retrieves a flash drive and they head home to Santa Cruz County, Arizona. Corrupt sheriff Jasper Calloway, who works for Garcia, receives a call from him ordering Jasper to detain Colt and his brother-in-law, Walt Reynolds, for stealing money from Garcia and he also saying that Colt killed his men. Garcia and his men depart Mexico to get Colt.

When the sheriffs arrive at Walt's residence, Colt quickly hides in the bunkhouse. Jasper then detains Walt and asks Colt's sister Angela for Colt's whereabouts. Colt escapes in Walt's car and the sheriffs chase him. Garcia and his men eventually arrive at the residence. Upon arriving, Garcia coldly shoots Walt in the head after he apologizes to him for what he did. Garcia then has his men, Reina and Cruz, search Colt to recover the flash drive. Garcia's men hold Angela and her daughter Hailey hostage inside their house. Meanwhile, the sheriffs catch Colt but are killed by Reina and Cruz. After the gunfight, Colt manages to kill them both. Shortly afterward, he is intercepted by other men, Lobo and Aguillar. He manages to kill Aguillar and he interrogates Lobo about the contents of the flash drive which is information about Garcia's bank accounts. Colt then kills him and races back to the residence.

Upon Colt arriving at the residence, Garcia, learning about the deaths of his men, threatens to kill Hailey if Colt does not surrender. Colt manages to overpower Garcia's men and kills the remaining goons while Hailey calls the state police for help. Angela and Hailey attempt to escape, but Garcia catches them and holds them at gunpoint. However, Jasper appears and betrays Garcia by killing him. Colt shoots Jasper and gives him a choice: a handcuff or a shotgun. When Jasper chooses shotgun, Colt quickly kills him. Afterwards, Colt hands the flash drive to Angela and drives away in a motorcycle as the state police arrive.

== Cast and characters ==
- Scott Adkins as Colton MacReady, a rogue soldier-turned-outlaw, who is forced to protect his sister and young niece from a corrupt sheriff and a dangerous drug cartel who descend upon his ranch for revenge.
- Nick Chinlund as Sheriff Jasper Calloway, the corrupt sheriff of Santa Cruz County, Arizona police department who secretly works for Fernando Garcia.
- Jake La Botz as Walt Reynolds, Colton's criminal brother-in-law.
- Tony Perez as Fernando "El Jefe" Garcia, a powerful Mexican drug kingpin and cartel leader, founder and head/leader of Garcia Cartel (one of the most powerful, dangerous and violent drug cartels in Mexico). He and his cartel sicarios go after Colton, from Hermosillo, Mexico (the Garcia Cartel's base) to his town in Arizona for revenge.
- Scott Evans as Deputy Logan, one of the members in the Calloway's team.
- Randy Hall as Deputy Wyatt, one of the members in the Calloway's team.
- Umar Khan as Sesma, a sicario and a member of Garcia Cartel.
- Caitlin Keats as Angela Reynolds, Colton's sister and Walt's widow.
- Madison Lawlor as Hailey Reynolds, Colton's niece.
- Julien Cesario as Ignacio, one of Garcia's main sicarios and a high-ranking member of Garcia Cartel.
- Jimmy Chhiu as Zavala, a member of Garcia Cartel.
- Ray Diaz as Victor Garcia, a member of Garcia Cartel.
- Robert Dill as Reina, a member of Garcia Cartel.
- Anthony L. Fernandez as Lobo, a member of Garcia Cartel.
- Eddie J. Fernandez as Mexican #2, a member of Garcia Cartel.
- Craig Henningsen as Pablo, one of Garcia's sicarios and a member of Garcia Cartel.
- Jeremy Marinas as Cruz, one of Garcia's main sicarios and a high-ranking member of Garcia Cartel.
- Nicholas Verdi as Ramos, one of Garcia's sicarios and a member of Garcia Cartel.

== Production ==
After "some delays" due to Adkins' busy schedule, filming began on December 3, 2014, and wrapped on February 3, 2015.

== Release ==
On September 16, 2015, the worldwide premiere took place on Polish television. It received a limited theatrical release and VOD release in the United States on December 4.

=== Marketing ===
On February 8, 2015, Bleiberg Entertainment presented (and sold) Close Range to potential buyers at the European Film Market in Berlin. Blue Box Entertainment bought the distribution rights to "key territories" (on behalf of interested parties); the US rights were sold to XLrator Media and the Canadian rights to VVS Films. Daro Films also bought the distribution rights (to Eastern Europe and Africa); as did AB Groupe (to France), California Filmes (to Latin America), Dutch FilmWorks (to Benelux), Eagle Films (to the Middle East), Moviebox (to Turkey), Second Gen Pictures (to Spain), and SGN Mediaworks (to India). A teaser trailer and poster was released on February 11, followed by the official trailer and theatrical poster on August 21.

=== Home media ===
The film was released on Blu-ray and DVD in the United States on January 5, 2016.
