= The Three Heroes and Five Gallants (disambiguation) =

The Three Heroes and Five Gallants (三俠五義) is a slightly different version of the 19th-century Chinese novel The Seven Heroes and Five Gallants.

The Three Heroes and Five Gallants may also refer to:

- The Three Heroes and Five Gallants (1991 TV series) (三俠五義), a 1991 Chinese TV series.
- The Three Heroes and Five Gallants (2016 TV series) (五鼠鬧東京), a 2016 Chinese TV series

== See also ==
- The Seven Heroes and Five Gallants (disambiguation)
- Justice Bao (disambiguation)
- Wu Shu Nao Dong Jing (disambiguation)
