= The Suspect (1998 film) =

1998 Hong Kong film by Ringo Lam

- Film poster
- Traditional Chinese: 極度重犯
- Simplified Chinese: 极度重犯
- Hanyu Pinyin: Jí Dù Zhòng Fàn
- Jyutping: Gik6 Dou2 Cung5 Faan2
- Directed by: Ringo Lam
- Written by: Ringo Lam; Lau Wing-kin
- Produced by: Wong Sing-lim; Nam Yin
- Starring: Louis Koo; Julian Cheung; Simon Yam; Ray Lui; Ada Choi; Eric Moo
- Cinematography: Ross W. Clarkson; Paul Yip
- Edited by: Marco Mak
- Music by: Raymond Wong; Andrew Worboys
- Production companies: Sil-Metropole Organisation; Globe Perfect International; Colour Business Entertainment
- Release date: 16 July 1998
- Running time: 90 minutes
- Country: Hong Kong
- Language: Cantonese
- Box office: HK$4,497,310

The Suspect is a 1998 Hong Kong action film written and directed by Ringo Lam and starring Louis Koo, Julian Cheung, Simon Yam, Ray Lui, Ada Choi and Eric Moo

== Plot ==
Twelve years ago in 1986, Don (Louis Koo) was imprisoned due to murder and the fact he did not testify against the mastermind Dante (Simon Yam) and his friend Max (Julian Cheung), who was also involved of committing the crime. Twelve years later, Don is released from prison and decides not to repeat the same mistakes and make a fresh start. However, Don receives a sudden call from Dante and Max, who force him to assassinate the candidate running for the president of the Philippines. Don rejects their request, but later discovers that the target has been assassinated. Don realizes he has been framed by Dante and begins to exile. Later, with the help of King Tso (Ray Lui), a legion soldier who was hired to take down the murderer, and Annie (Ada Choi), a female reporter, Don reveals the evidence of Dante's crime and clears himself.

== Cast ==
- Louis Koo as Don Lee
- Julian Cheung as Max Mak
- Simon Yam as Dante Aquino
- Ray Lui as King Tso
- Ada Choi as Annie Chung
- Eric Moo as Policeman
- Philip Ko as Aquino's henchman
- Johnny Cheung as Gary
- Raven Choi
- Iris Chai
- Fok Wing-fu as Aquino's henchman
- Mike Cassey as TV news reporter
- Tang Cheung
- Leung Ka-hei as Ray / Ah Hei

== Reception ==
=== Critical ===
Love HK Film gave the film a mixed review describing it as being "more competent than spectacular, which registers the film as an eventual disappointment."

=== Box office ===
The film grossed HK$4,497,310 at the Hong Kong box office during its theatrical run from 16 July to 5 August 1998 in Hong Kong.
