= Cupid One =

1985 Hong Kong film by Ringo Lam

- Film poster
- 愛神一號
- Directed by: Ringo Lam
- Screenplay by: Wellington Fung; Ringo Lam
- Produced by: Dean Shek; Raymond Pak-Ming Wong
- Starring: Sally Yeh; Mark Cheng
- Cinematography: Joe Chan
- Edited by: Tony Chow
- Music by: Tony Lo
- Production company: Cinema City
- Release date: 17 May 1985
- Running time: 95 minutes
- Country: Hong Kong
- Language: Cantonese
- Box office: HK$6,382,935

Cupid One
- Chinese: 愛神一號
Transcriptions
Standard Mandarin
- Hanyu Pinyin: Ài shén yī hào
Yue: Cantonese
- Jyutping: ngoi3 san4 jat1 hou6

Cupid One (Chinese: 愛神一號) is a 1985 Hong Kong romantic comedy film directed by Ringo Lam and starring Sally Yeh and Mark Cheng.

== Plot ==
Late for a wedding after getting a flat tire, pampered heiress May causes a car crash when she tries to flag down another car. Following an argument, the car's driver Keung swears that he will take revenge on May if he ever meets her again. After the wedding, May's fiancé Danny's father Mr. Wong tells him to get May drunk and take her to a hotel. Danny follows his father's instructions and May agrees to go to the hotel, at which point Danny gives thanks to his father out loud for the idea. May abandons him for getting all of his ideas from his father, and winds up passing out drunk on a boat being sailed to Thailand by Keung. The enemies are forced to spend the next ten days together en route to Thailand. When they arrive there, May is arrested for not having a passport and Keung is arrested on suspicion of slave trading. Keung's girlfriend Lou and Danny bring May's passport, enabling the two prisoners to be released. Once separated from May and back with his girlfriend Lou, Keung cannot stop thinking about May and aggressively seeks to take Danny's place.

== Cast ==
- Sally Yeh as May Yeung Yee-Ching
- Mark Cheng as Keung / King Kong (as Ho-Nam Cheng)
- Joh Yin Cheung as Lou
- Erik Ka-Kei Chan as Wong Ka-Chi
- Sun Wong as Mr. Wong, Ka-Chi's Father
- Chuen Chan as Fat Chan
- Yu Miu-Lin as Fat Chan's Girlfriend
- Kin Lo as Pub Customer
- Chan Chi-Shing as Pub Customer
- Leung Chi-Ming as Fat Ball
- Cheng Mang-Ha as Lady Driver of Old Beatle
- K.K. Wong as Mr. Wong's Party Guest
- Wellington Fung as Lawyer Fung
- Fung Ling as Mr. Wong's Party Guest
- Chan Yau-Hau as Old Man in Beetle
- Ng Hon-Keung as Pub Customer
- Shing Wing-Biu as Pub Customer

== Reception ==
In a review for lovehkfilm.com, reviewer Kozo described the film as a "Fluffy romantic comedy that turns into an overwrought melodrama thanks to the ever-personable Ringo Lam." The reviewer continues, "This early Ringo Lam film is a commercial romance, but one can see some of his overwrought directorial style seeping through Cupid One’s saccharine exterior."

The website brns.com gave the film a rating of 6.0/10, writing, "Unfortunately, Lam loses his light touch for the last third of the film and the heavy handed plot turn takes all of the wind out of this film’s sails. It is really a shame because the first hour is very amusing."

The website AllMovie gave the film a negative review, writing, "One of popular Hong Kong filmmaker Ringo Lam's least satisfying efforts, this work-for-hire assignment can't decide whether it wants to be a romantic comedy or a suspenseful psychological thriller, and so plays it both ways to stultifying effect." The review concludes, "Genre enthusiasts will still be interested in the film for Cheng's spirited acting debut, a first-rate star turn by Yeh, and a supporting cast including Eric Chan, Bee Lee-tan, and Cho Yin-lung, but fans of Lam's spectacular later films may be disappointed."

The website onderhond.com gave the film a rating of 2 out of 5 stars.

== Accolades ==
Mark Cheng was nominated for a Hong Kong Film Award for Best New Performer at the 5th Hong Kong Film Awards.
