= Assassin's Bullet =

- Film poster
- Directed by: Isaac Florentine
- Written by: Nancy L. Babine; Hans Feuersinger
- Story by: Elika Portnoy
- Produced by: David E. Ornston
- Starring: Christian Slater; Donald Sutherland; Elika Portnoy; Timothy Spall; Valentin Ganev; Bashar Rahal; Marian Valev
- Cinematography: Ross W. Clarkson
- Edited by: Irit Raz
- Music by: Simon Stevens
- Production companies: Mutressa Movies; Sofia Productions
- Distributed by: ARC Entertainment; XLrator Media
- Release dates: April 18, 2012 (Boston Film Festival); August 3, 2012 (DVD)
- Running time: 89 minutes
- Country: United States
- Language: English

Assassin's Bullet (also known as Sofia) is a 2012 American action drama thriller film directed by Isaac Florentine and starring Christian Slater, Donald Sutherland and Elika Portnoy, who is also credited for the story. The film was released direct to video.

== Premise ==
When a vigilante decides to murder one by one the most wanted terrorists in the world, the FBI decides to send an agent to discover the identity of this person.

== Cast ==
- Christian Slater as Robert Diggs
- Donald Sutherland as Ambassador Ashdown
- Elika Portnoy as Victoria Denev
- Timothy Spall as Dr. Khan
- Valentin Ganev as Mikhail Denev
- Bashar Rahal as Abdullah Said
- Marian Valev as Gregor Spasov

== Reception ==
The film received negative reviews and has a 7% rating on Rotten Tomatoes based on 15 reviews, with an average rating of 2.3/10. Metacritic, which uses a weighted average, assigned the film a score of 20 out of 100, based on 11 critics, indicating "generally unfavorable" reviews.

Alison Willmore of The A.V. Club called the film an "amusingly awful thriller" and Drew Taylor of IndieWire called it "a bad movie with incredibly clumsy narrative mechanics."

Frank Scheck of The Hollywood Reporter wrote, "The action sequences are strictly pro forma and -- despite the sleek killer’s resemblance to the similarly lethal heroine of La Femme Nikita -- this dull effort lacks the excitement generated by any of its incarnations."

Lisa Schwarzbaum of Entertainment Weekly gave the film a C.
