= Cynthia Khan =

Taiwanese actress

- Chinese: 楊麗菁
- Born: Yang Li-tsing; 13 December 1968 (age 57); Chiayi County, Taiwan
- Education: National Taiwan College of Performing Arts
- Occupations: Actress; dancer; yoga instructor; martial artist

Chinese name
- Traditional Chinese: 楊麗菁
- Simplified Chinese: 杨丽菁
Transcriptions

Yang Li-tsing (born 13 December 1968), better known internationally by her stage name Cynthia Khan, is a Taiwanese actress, dancer and martial artist. She starred in many Hong Kong girls with guns films.

== Early life ==
Yang studied Chinese and jazz dance at school. At 17, she won a national talent contest run by a Taiwanese television station. She later learned taekwondo and achieved a high level in this martial art.

== Career ==
In 1987, Yang made her film debut in In the Line of Duty 3. The film's box office success started her long career. Sequels and other films followed, many of them in the girls with guns genre, most notably In the Line of Duty 4: Witness, directed and choreographed by Yuen Woo-ping and co-starring Donnie Yen.

She now lives in Taiwan.

== Origin of stage name ==
Her screen name is a combination of the names of established Pennsylvania action star Cynthia Rothrock and Malaysian star Michelle Yeoh (then known as Michelle Khan), both whom were prominent in British Hong Kong films; she replaced Yeoh in the In the Line of Duty movie series.

== Filmography ==
=== Film ===
Year	English title	Original title	Role	Notes
1986	This Love of Mine	我的愛	An Ling	
1987	Bloody Brothers	黑道兄弟		
1987	Split of the Spirit	厲鬼纏身	Kao PI Liang	
1987	Flag of Honor	旗正飘飘		
1988	Innocence and Dissipation	赤子心浪子情		
1988	Three Headed Monster	三頭魔王	Leader of hunters	
1988	Vampire Kid II	天外天小子	Widow	
1988	In the Line of Duty 3	皇家师姐III雌雄大盗	Yeung Lai-Ching	
1989	In the Line of Duty 4: Witness	皇家師姐IV直擊證人	Rachel Yeung Lai-Ching	
1990	Middle Man	皇家師姐V中間人		
1990	Tiger Cage 2	洗黑錢	Inspector Yeung	
1991	Queen's High	紅粉至尊	Kwanny Yeung	
1991	The Perfect Match	富貴吉祥	Fiona's cousin	
1991	Forbidden Arsenal	地下兵工廠	Madam Yeung	
1991	The Transmigration Romance	花街神女	Sis Chan	
1991	Sea Wolves	海狼	Inspector Yeung	
1992	Eternal Fist		Wild; Lyssa	English-language film
1992	Super Lady Cop	超級女警	Nieh Ling; Chuan Lai	
1992	Deadend of Besiegers	東瀛遊俠	Cui Gu	
1992	It's Now or Never	飛女正傳	Little Bun	
1992	Zen of Sword	俠女傳奇	Choi Siu-Ching	
1992	The Inspector Wears Skirts IV	92霸王花與霸王花	Madam Yang	
1993	The 13 Cold-Blooded Eagles	新冷血十三鷹	Quihua	
1993	Pink Bomb	人生得意衰盡歡	Leung Chi-kwan	
1993	Blade of Fury	一刀傾城	Nine Catties	
1993	Madam City Hunter	城市女獵人	Ching	
1993	The Top Lady of Sword	葵花聖女		
1993	Death Triangle	末路狂花	Hsie Wan Chin	
1993	The Avenging Quartet	霸海紅英	Chin	
1993	Murders Made to Order	蠍子之滅殺行動	Nikko	
1993	The Tale of a Heroine	天山玉女劍		
1993	The Invincible Constable	七俠五義之五鼠鬧東京	Ding Yuehua	
1994	The Gods Must Be Funny in China	非洲超人	Ginzi	
1995	Ultimate Revenge	雷霆行動	Inspector Ching	
1995	Tough Beauty and the Sloppy Slop	怒海威龍	Captain Yang	
1995	Angel on Fire	喋血柔情	Siu Ching	Filipino version: Matira ang matibay
1995	Twinkle Funny Star	快樂希望蠟筆小星		
1995	Yes Madam	師姐也瘋狂	Lydia Lee	
1995	Only the Strong Survive			
1996	Yes, Madam 5	危情追蹤	Inspector Yeung	
1996	Who Killed Him	誰殺了他		
1997	Super Cops	伙頭大將軍		
1997	Tiger Angels	雌虎威龍	Rose	
1998	Return of Dragon	重振精武門		
2000	Supercom.com	雷霆特警	Pin	
2000	Guard Soldier	護法奇兵	Mary Young	
2002	The Boxing King	力王之黑色擂台	Hung Ying	
2003	Hurricane Bullet	子彈狂飆	Cheng Lee Ping	
2003	Fatal Love Web	致命情網	Detective	
2003	Radical	極端份子	Policewoman	
2003	Hacker Pioneers	駭客尖兵	Policewoman	
2003	Catching Murderer Overseas	跨海擒兇	Ying	
2010	Super Player	大玩家	Hero's wife	
2013	Pay Back	猎仇者	Yang Yan's wife	
2014	Poseidon Code	海神密码	Sheng Qianqian	
2019	Crazy Bank Card			

=== Television ===
Year	English title	Original title	Role	Notes
1986	The Banner Heroes	大旗英雄傳	Shui Lingguang	
1988	The Legend of Cicada Wings	蟬翼傳奇	Zhong Mengshuang	
1995	Heavenly Ghost Catcher	天師鍾馗	Fang Lin	Story: "Sunflower Manual" (葵花寶典)
1995	Chor Lau-heung	香帥傳奇	Shangguan Wuji	
1995	The Amazing Heroine Hua Mulan	天地奇英花木蘭	Hua Mulan	
1996	The Beggar Emperor	乞丐皇帝	Princess Mingxia	
1996	Dark Tales	聊齋	Lu Jincai; Lu Hanzhu	Story 1: "Stealing Love Through Time" (流光情劫)
1996	Dark Tales	聊齋	Liu Mulian	Story 2: "The Heroine and Mr. Tian" (俠女田郎)
1996	Southern Shaolin	新南少林	Guo Yingjiao	
1997	Bodyguards	保鏢	Zhao Yanling	
1997	Thunderstorm Rider	霹靂菩薩	Ashe	
1998	Curly Beard and Red Sleeves	虯髯客與紅拂女	Shishi	
1998	Gods Are Watching over You	舉頭三尺有神明	Liao Shuzhen	
1998	Secret Police	警網雄風	Li Xin	
1999	Master of Zen	達摩	Aman	
2001	The Eloquent Ji Xiaolan	鐵齒銅牙紀曉嵐	Mo Chou	
2004	A Hero of Medicine in Lingnan	嶺南藥俠	Lai Honggu	
2005	Darling, See Here	亲爱的，看招	Lin Heping	
2005	Dr. Big Bear's Home	大熊醫師家	Xiaojing	Sitcom
2007	The Legend of Lu Xiaofeng	陸小鳳傳奇	Wuyan	
2008	The Amazing Strategist Liu Bowen	神機妙算劉伯溫	Sang Qi	
2008	Taste of the Bamboo Shoot	冬筍的滋味	Xu Wusun	
2008	Fatal Narcotics	禁毒使命	Su Mei	
2013	The Story of Mulan	花木蘭傳奇	Jia Yun	
2015	Ghost Stories 4	聊齋新編	Imperial Consort Han	Story 7: "A Student Named Ye" (葉生)
2015	The World of Love	失寵王妃之結緣	Jiang Nanqing	
