= Looking for Mister Perfect =

2003 Hong Kong film by Ringo Lam

- Film poster
- 奇逢敵手
- Directed by: Ringo Lam
- Screenplay by: Mike Cassey
- Story by: Ringo Lam
- Produced by: Johnny To
- Starring: Shu Qi; Andy On
- Cinematography: Ross W. Clarkson
- Edited by: David Richardson
- Music by: Roger Wang
- Production company: Milkyway Image
- Release date: 27 March 2003
- Running time: 101 minutes
- Country: Hong Kong
- Language: Cantonese
- Box office: HK$1,089,427

Looking for Mister Perfect
- Chinese: 奇逢敵手
Transcriptions
Standard Mandarin
- Hanyu Pinyin: Qí féng díshǒu
Yue: Cantonese
- Jyutping: kei4 fung4 dik6 sau2

Looking for Mister Perfect (Chinese: 奇逢敵手) is a 2003 Hong Kong action romantic comedy film directed by Ringo Lam and starring Shu Qi and Andy On. Several other notable actors play smaller roles in the film.

== Plot ==
After police officer Grace kills a suspect who is resisting arrest, it is recommended that she take some time off. She and her friend Joey, who is always encouraging Grace to get married and quit her dangerous job, travel to Malaysia to relax. While there, Joey is scouted to participate in a series of photo shoots for a watch company while a pair of criminals, Mr. Poon and his girlfriend, are attempting to sell a stolen missile tracking system. Grace falls for a man who is secretly an undercover officer trying to catch the criminals.

== Cast ==
- Shu Qi as Grace
- Andy On as Alex
- Isabel Chan as Joey
- Simon Yam as Poon
- Ruby Wong as Poon's Girlfriend
- David Wu as Richard
- Raymond Wong Ho-yin as Vincent
- Hui Shiu Hung as Teddy
- Lam Suet as Bobby Chan
- Chapman To as Crab
- Kristal Tin as Mrs. Chan
- Nelson Cheung as James
- Godfrey Ngai as Ken
- Cody Lee as Tina
- Lai Yiu Cheung as Grace's Superior Officer
- Mike Cassey as The Preacher (uncredited)

== Reception ==
The review website brns.com gave the film a rating of 7.5/10, writing, "The film has that kind of relaxing laid back atmosphere to it as it mixes comedy, romance and action into an adorable little package that feels like waking up next to a freshly cut tropical fruit salad waiting for that first yummy bite. The film is nearly all in jest and one should not take it seriously for a moment. It is as if Ringo told his cast – we are here to have a good time and work on our tans – so have fun with your characters. Though Hsu Chi and Andy On are the main focus, it is a true ensemble effort that gives everyone some quality screen time and allows Simon to steal the film whenever he shows up."

The review website asianfilmstrike.com gave the film a rating of 2½ out of 5 stars, calling it "a rare light, glitzy and non-urban film in Ringo Lam’s distinguished filmography" and praising its "spectacular jet-ski chase" and "impressive motorbike stunts".

Reviewer Kozo of lovehkfilm.com wrote, "This action-comedy from the usually dour Ringo Lam is unrepentantly silly and surprisingly entertaining. Looking for Mr. Perfect is far from perfect cinema, but its got enough playfulness and panache to make for some fun time-killing."

Reviewer Andrew Saroch of fareastfilms.com gave the film a rating of 3 out of 5 stars, writing, "Shu Qi is a charming and very magnetic lead while Simon Yam steals most of the scenes he’s in with his outrageous pink suits, snake skin boots and freakish posturing. Also noteworthy is the appearance of a few brief, but welcome action scenes that are free from the mind-numbing CGI-enhancement that has all but killed the genuine fight action that Hong Kong was so famous for. Andy On may not be the most charismatic lead, but this area finds him in his element."

Reviewer Raging Gaijin of cityonfire.com gave the film a rating of 6.5/10, writing, "Overall, 'Looking for Mr. Perfect' is light-weight fluff but the skilled direction of Ringo Lam and the charisma of Simon Yam make it worth watching for HK fans seeking a mild diversion." Reviewer Ben Poppel of the same website gave it a rating of 7/10, writing, "If you are in the mood to watch a movie where you basically throw out the plot and just want to have fun, this is the movie for you. Yeah, it is shallow, cheesy, campy, ridiculous, crazy, annoying and superficial; but a hell lot of fun. The production values and star power are at full notch. But don't expect quality acting or fighting for that matter - instead goofy, over the top performances are abundant all over this film. That is what makes it so enjoyable."

The review website worldfilmgeek.com gave the film a B− rating, writing, "The film was actually Andy On’s real film debut, shot in 2001, but producer Charles Heung thought Black Mask 2: City of Masks would be a better film debut for On. The film was ultimately released in 2003, but bombed at the box office due to its being released during the Hong Kong SARS epidemic. In the end, Looking for Mister Perfect is not the 'perfect' action film. However, it is still a fun film to enjoy and shows truly the beginnings of future action star Andy On as well as good performances by Shu Qi, Lam Suet, Hui Shiu-Hung, and the alwats [sic] watchable Simon Yam."

The website heroic-cinema.com gave the film a rating of 4 beats out of 10, writing, "Looking for Mister Perfect is a real shallow piece of cinema that, unless you’re looking for a reason to go to Malaysia, will leave you feeling some what unsatisfied."
