= Justice Bao (disambiguation) =

- Chinese: 包青天
- Literal meaning: "Blue-Sky Bao" "Clear-Sky Bao" "Blue-Sky Pao" "Clear-Sky Pao"
Transcriptions
Standard Mandarin
- Hanyu Pinyin: Bāo Qīng Tiān
- Wade–Giles: Pao^{1} Ch'ing^{1} T'ien^{1}
Yue: Cantonese
- Jyutping: Baau1 Cing1 Tin1

Justice Bao, Justice Pao, Judge Bao, Judge Pao, Lord Bao, Lord Pao, Magistrate Bao and Magistrate Pao are all references to Bao Zheng (999–1062, also romanized as Pao Cheng), legendary Song dynasty official and the Chinese symbol of justice.

These terms may also refer to:

== TV series ==
- Justice Pao (1974 TV series), a 1974–1975 Taiwanese TV series starring Yi Ming
- Judge Bao (TV series), a 1987 Chinese TV series starring Bai Zhidi
- Justice Pao (1993 TV series), a 1993–1994 Taiwanese TV series starring Jin Chao-chun
- Justice Pao (1994 TVB series), a 1994 Hong Kong TV series produced by TVB, starring Jin Chao-chun
- Justice Pao (1995 TVB series), a 1995 Hong Kong TV series produced by TVB, starring Ti Lung
- Justice Pao (1995 Asia Television series), a 1995 Hong Kong TV series produced by Asia Television, starring Jin Chao-chun
- Return of Judge Bao, a 2003 Taiwanese TV series starring Jin Chao-chun
- Justice Pao (2004 TV series), a 2004 Chinese TV series starring Wang Xuebing
- Justice Bao (2008 TV series), a 2008 Chinese TV series starring Jin Chao-chun
- Justice Bao (2010 TV series), a 2010–2012 Chinese TV series starring Jin Chao-chun
- Justice Bao (2025 TV series), a 2025 Thailand and Chinese TV series produced by Channel 3 and Tencent Penguin Pictures, Starring Ken Chu

== Songs ==
- "Bao Qing Tian", the theme song of the series. It was also the theme song of the 1993–1994 series as well as the 2003 Hong Kong film Cat and Mouse.

== See also ==
- The Seven Heroes and Five Gallants (disambiguation)
- The Three Heroes and Five Gallants (disambiguation)
- Wu Shu Nao Dong Jing (disambiguation)
- Young Justice Bao (disambiguation)
- Judge Bao fiction, topical overview of fiction about Bao Zheng
