= Hounds of War =

2024 film by Isaac Florentine

- Release poster
- Directed by: Isaac Florentine
- Written by: Jean Pierre Magro
- Produced by: Andre Relis; Aaron Briffa; Vladimir Chistiakov; Alexey Meets; Vadim Fortunin; Jean Pierre Magro
- Starring: Frank Grillo; Robert Patrick; Rhona Mitra
- Cinematography: Ericson Core
- Edited by: Paul Harb; Kurt Nishimura; Pedram Torbati
- Production companies: Opulence Pictures; XYZ Films; Howl; MFC Global Films; Zum Pictures Malta
- Distributed by: XYZ Films
- Release date: September 20, 2024
- Running time: 94 minutes
- Country: United States
- Language: English

Hounds of War is a 2024 American action thriller film directed by Isaac Florentine and written by Jean-Pierre Magro. It stars Frank Grillo, Robert Patrick, and Rhona Mitra in leading roles. The film explores themes of revenge, betrayal, and survival against military warfare. It was released on September 20, 2024, by XYZ Films.

== Plot ==
Hounds of War follows the story of a group of mercenaries sent on a dangerous mission that takes a deadly turn. When the operation goes wrong, and the mercenaries were killed, the remaining soldier, Ryder, embarks on a high-stakes quest for revenge against his former boss for not only getting his soldiers/friends killed, including his brother, but also murdering his pregnant sister-in-law.

== Cast ==
Main

- Frank Grillo as Ryder
- Robert Patrick as Colonel Hart
- Rhona Mitra as Selina
- Leeshon Alexander as Bulldog
- Urs Rechn as Hollywood
- Matthew Marsh as President Lane
- Steven Elder as Joshua Reed
- Victor Solé as Rosebud
- Seydina Baldé as Femi
- Marc Hoang as Jing (as Nghi Hoang)
- Mark Strange as Santiago
- Joey Ansah as Milktooth
- Yvonne Mai as Jenna
- Raha Rahbari as Maria Torres Blanco
- Marc Cabourdin as Paulie
- Steffi Thake as Hart's Daughter
- Marysia S. Peres as Journalist

== Production ==
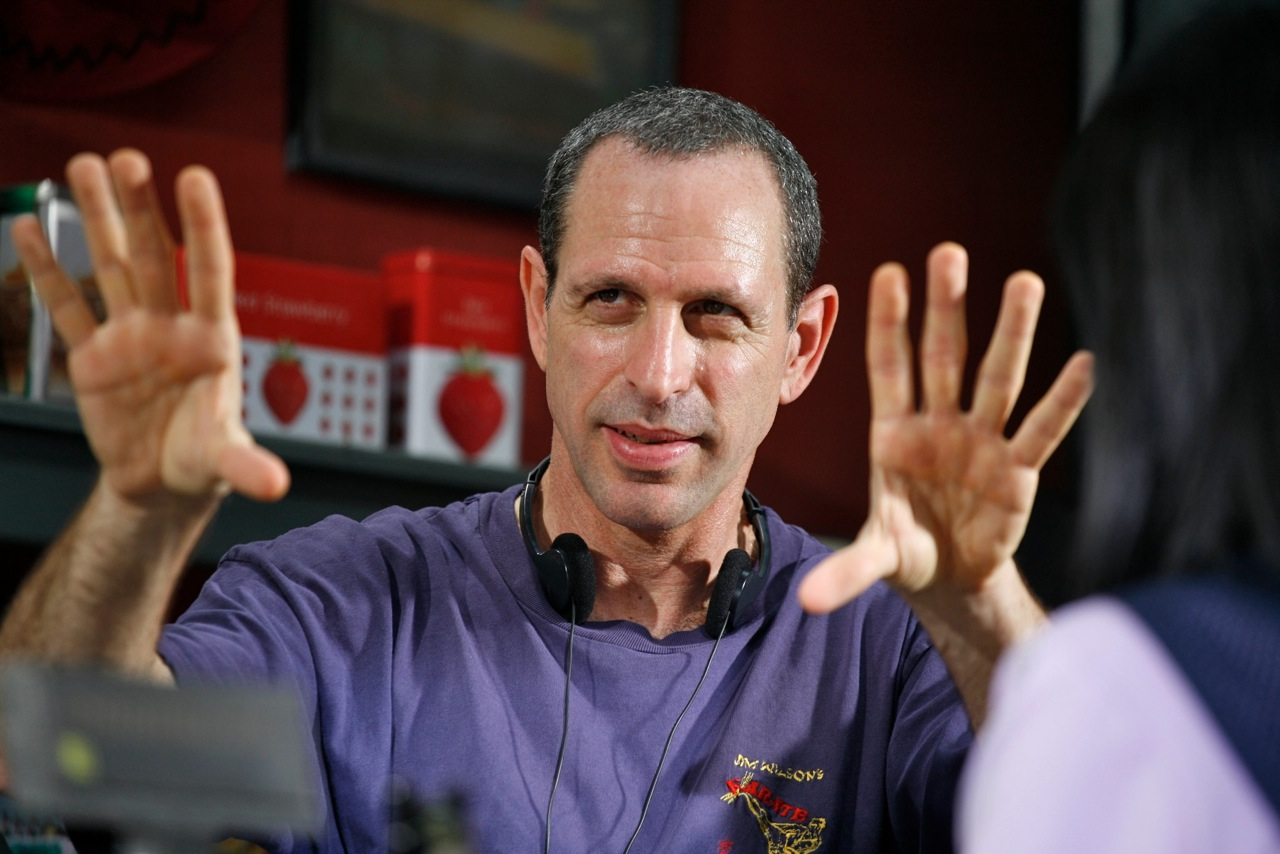
Isaac Florentine (pictured in 2022)

Hounds of War is directed by Isaac Florentine, known for his work on action films like Undisputed and Ninja, with Jean-Pierre Magro writing the screenplay.

=== Development and filming ===
Principal photography began in late 2022, with the film primarily being shot in Malta, which served as the backdrop for the mercenary team's mission.

In May 2022, XYZ Films acquired the rights to the film, starring Frank Grillo as the character Ryder, alongside Rhona Mitra, Robert Patrick, Mark Strange, and Steven Elder. XYZ Films also joined the project as executive producers and was set to introduce the film, along with screening footage for potential buyers, at the 2022 Marché du Film in Cannes.

The film is produced by XYZ Films and Opulence Pictures.

== Reception ==
Critical response

Darren Murray of Maaction Cinema gave the film a "3^{3}/_{5}" grade, criticizing the film Characters". Darren said that "Hounds of War isn't the complete success I initially hoped for, but it was still a worthwhile experience." Fans of Florentine will appreciate his action direction, even if it doesn't quite reach the heights of his best works. Jayanty Nada Shofa of the Jakarta Globe wrote, "Hounds of War sounds like the title of an action-packed movie, but the one-and-a-half-hour film starring Frank Grillo turns out to be a total snoozefest." He further noted that it "lacks a well-established set-up," and much of the film feels like "an excuse to grab some theater popcorn."

While the movie features plenty of action scenes, Shofa criticized the editing, saying it fails to keep the excitement alive. Many combat scenes, especially those involving kicks, are fast-forwarded, detracting from their impact. The performances, including Grillo's, are described as unremarkable.

== Release ==
The film was originally scheduled for release in 2023, but its release date was moved to September 2024.
