= Shark in Venice =

- Directed by: Danny Lerner
- Written by: Danny Lerner
- Produced by: Lee Weldon
- Starring: Stephen Baldwin; Vanessa Johansson; Giacomo Gonnella; Hilda van der Meulen
- Cinematography: Ross W. Clarkson
- Edited by: Michele Gisser
- Music by: Steve Edwards
- Production companies: Nu Image Films; Venice Sharks
- Distributed by: First Look International
- Release date: August 6, 2008
- Running time: 88 minutes
- Country: United States
- Languages: English; Italian

Shark in Venice (known as Sharks in Venice in the United States) is a 2008 American natural-horror film directed by Danny Lerner and starring Stephen Baldwin, Giacomo Gonnella and Vanessa Johansson.

== Plot ==
The film takes place in Venice, where archeologist David Franks (Stephen Baldwin) and his girlfriend Laura (Vanessa Johansson) are meeting with Venetian police to learn more about the mysterious disappearance of David's father. During the boat ride to where they think David's father may have last been seen, David sees the dorsal fin of a large shark. In a double-take he looks back and the fin is gone. David and another man, Rossi, enter the canals wearing wetsuits and scuba gear. A large shark preys on the two and in a sudden attack Rossi is eaten. David is bitten in the shoulder but manages to escape to a cave.

In the cave, David narrowly escapes several close calls with contraptions. He then emerges in a large room in the cave which holds vast amounts of treasure. David stares in wonder at it, pockets a gold and emerald brooch and returns to Laura in the boat. The next scene shows him recuperating in a hospital bed with Laura by his side.

David and Laura are asked to meet and have dinner with businessman Vito Clemenza (Giacomo Gonnella). Clemenza produces the brooch David had taken from the treasure room and asks David to return to the cave. As unsuspecting tourists are devoured, David contemplates his next move. Before too long Laura is kidnapped by Clemenza's Mafia goons. David decides to try to save her with the help of the Venetian police. Ultimately, David defeats the Mafia, saves Laura and finds the treasure, which his father had died searching for. Clemenza is killed by one of the sharks when he falls in the water while fighting David.

It is unclear whether it is a scientific phenomenon leading to the gradual increase in the temperature of the Grand Canal and the presence of at least one great white shark taking up residence in the city of Venice. Later in the film Clemenza appears to tell David that he is the one who has introduced the sharks to the waterways.

== Cast ==
- Stephen Baldwin as David Franks
- Vanessa Johansson as Laura
- Hilda van der Meulen as Lt. Sofia Totti
- Giacomo Gonnella as Vito Clemenza
- Ivaylo Geraskov as Rossi
- Atanas Srebrev as Captain Bonasera
- Kaloyan Vondenicharov as Man In Black
- Bashar Rahal as Medical Examiner
- Vladimir Kolev as Assistant
- Michael McCoy as Dean Flathers
- Asen Blatechki as Operator
- Rolando Cadenas as Jennings
- Ivo Kehayov as Cop
- Dejan Angelov as Henchman (uncredited)
- Anna Kulinova as Girl (uncredited)
- Vladimir Vladimirov as Tourist (uncredited)

== Production ==
The film was shot on location in Bulgaria, as stated in the making-of documentary on the movie's DVD release.

== Release ==
The film was released on December 14, 2008 in the United States, and on August 6, 2009 on DVD as Der weiße Hai von Venedig in Germany. The film received negative reviews. An online reviewer on the website Bananas About Movies wrote that it is "a bad film, poorly made. But just bad enough to be worth watching. At least once. Then strike it from your mind". Jennie Kermode of Eye for Film gave the film 1 and a half stars out of 5, praising Gonnella's performance and some of the violent scenes, but criticized the underuse of the setting and Baldwin's "charisma-free" performance, concluding: "Overall, Shark In Venice fails to live up to its snappy title but it's just awful enough for a certain kind of film fan to find it delightful."

== See also ==
- List of killer shark films
