= Jake La Botz =

American singer-songwriter

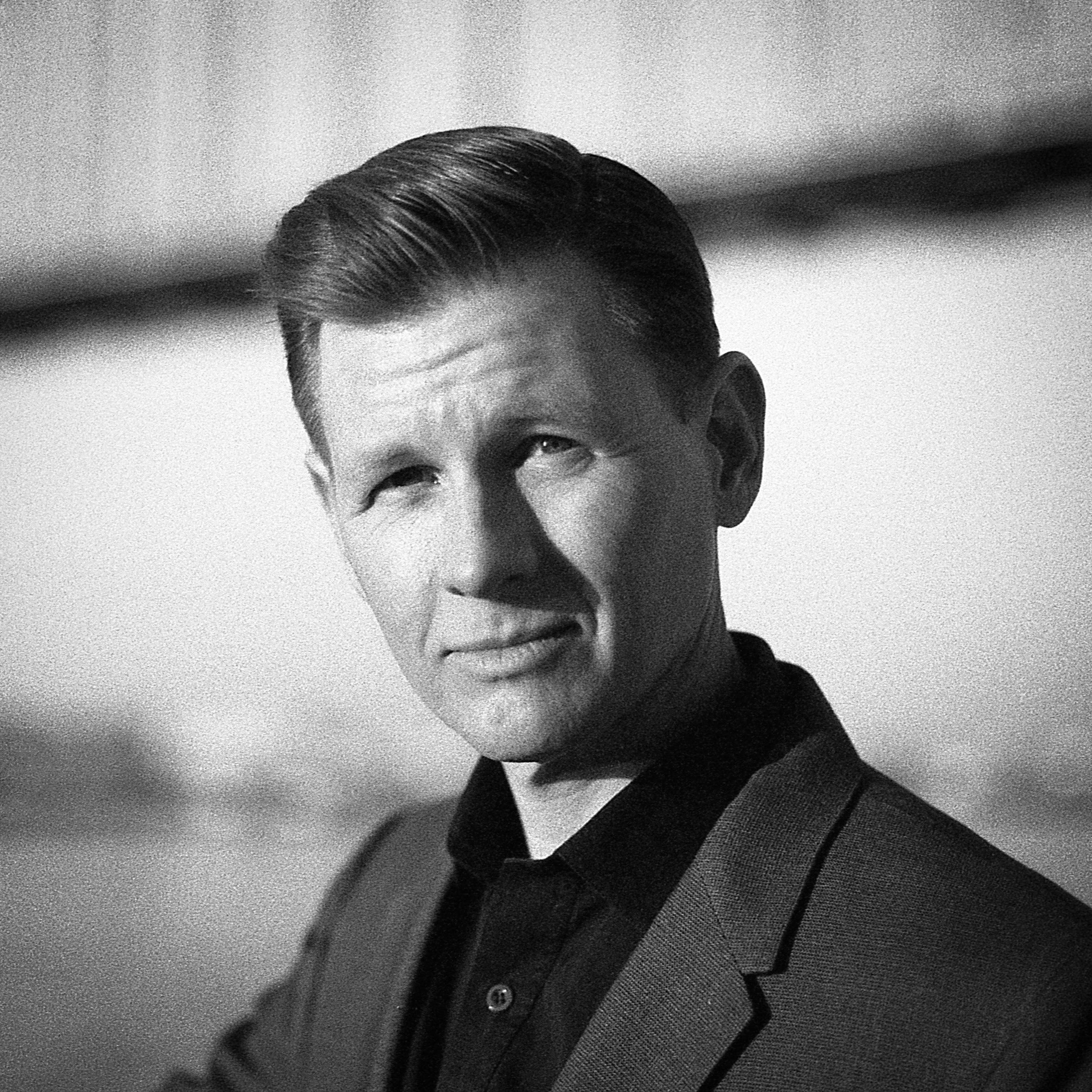
- Born: November 23, 1968 (age 57); Chicago, Illinois, United States
- Occupations: Singer, songwriter, actor
- Years active: 1990s–present
- Spouse: Abby Brammell (m. 2006–2008)
- Website: jakelabotz.com

Jake La Botz (born November 23, 1968) is an American blues singer, songwriter, actor and meditation teacher from Chicago, Illinois, United States.

== Early life ==
La Botz dropped out of high school in his early teens. He later briefly attended Shimer College, a small Great Books school then located in Waukegan, Illinois.

== Career ==
=== Music ===
La Botz learned to play the blues from the last of the prewar bluesmen living in Chicago in the late 1980s and early 1990s: David "Honeyboy" Edwards, Homesick James, and Maxwell Street Jimmy Davis. He has been touring nationally and internationally for many years, and since 2006, has been known for his Tattoo Across America Tour, in which he performs at tattoo parlors across the country. His original compositions are featured in many films and TV shows.

=== Film ===
La Botz began his acting career after catching the attention of actor, director, and independent filmmaker Steve Buscemi, who cast La Botz as a blues-singing convict in his 2000 film Animal Factory. La Botz performed two original songs in the film, "This Ain't the Way I Came Up" and "Lay Down the Bottle." In the next few years, La Botz appeared in Terry Zwigoff's arthouse film Ghost World as well as in Buscemi's Lonesome Jim. In 2008, La Botz starred in Sylvester Stallone's Rambo, in which he performed two songs from his album Graveyard Jones, "The Wishing Well" and "Tiny." Other notable film appearances include Timur Bekmambetov's Abraham Lincoln: Vampire Hunter and Walter Salles's film adaptation of Jack Kerouac's On the Road, in which he performs his song "Hard to Love What You Kill." La Botz's 2015 film credits include the lead role in The Grace of Jake, an independent film directed by Chris Hicky, and a starring role in Isaac Florentine's action movie Close Range.

=== Television ===
In season two of the highly praised television show True Detective, La Botz portrays country singing legend Conway Twitty.

=== Theater ===
In the spring of 2012, La Botz starred as the satanic character The Shape in the original stage musical Ghost Brothers of Darkland County, written by Stephen King and John Mellencamp with musical direction by T-Bone Burnett, which premiered at the Alliance Theater in Atlanta, Georgia. Over the next couple of years, Ghost Brothers went on to do two national tours, with La Botz reprising his role as The Shape.

== Meditation ==
La Botz has been practicing and studying meditation since 2001 within the Tibetan Buddhist lineage of Chogyam Trungpa Rinpoche and is a close student of Buddhist scholar, teacher, and Dharma Ocean spiritual director Reginald Ray.

== Discography ==
- Original Soundtrack to My Nightmare (1999)
- Used to Be (2002)
- All Soul and No Money (2004)
- Graveyard Jones (2006)
- Sing This to Yourself (2008)
- I'm a Crow (2009)
- Get Right (2013)
- Sunnyside (2017)
- They're Coming For Me (October 18, 2019)
- Hair on Fire (Sept 9, 2022)

== Filmography ==
Year	Title	Role	Notes
2000	Animal Factory	Jesse	
2001	Ghost World	Blueshammer Member – Blues Club	
2002	13 Moons	Right to lifer	
2004	The Grey	Homer	
2005	Lonesome Jim	Phillip	
2006	One Night With You	Eddie	
2008	Rambo	Reese	
2010	Sinners and Saints	Melvin	
2011	Fully Loaded	Jake	
2011	Ordinary Madness	Himself	
2012	On the Road	Okie Hitchhiker	
2012	Abraham Lincoln: Vampire Hunter	Bull Run Private	
2014	Bad Country	Jacket	
2015	The Grace of Jake	Jake Haynes	
2015	Close Range	Walt Reynolds	
2018	Relentless	Tattooed Man	
