= Undeclared War =

1990 Hong Kong film by Ringo Lam

- DVD cover

Chinese name
- Traditional Chinese: 聖戰風雲
- Simplified Chinese: 圣战风云
Transcriptions
Standard Mandarin
- Hanyu Pinyin: Shèng Zhàn Fēng Yún
Yue: Cantonese
- Jyutping: Sing3 Zin3 Fung1 Wan4
- Directed by: Ringo Lam
- Screenplay by: Nam Yin; Timothy Lung; Deborah Grant; Louis Roth
- Produced by: Ringo Lam
- Starring: Danny Lee; Olivia Hussey; Peter Liapis; Rosamund Kwan; Vernon G. Wells; Tommy Wong; Victor Hon; Dean Harrington; David Hedison
- Cinematography: Lau Hung-chuen
- Edited by: Tony Chow
- Music by: Noel Quinlan
- Production company: Cinema City Entertainment
- Distributed by: Golden Princess Amusement
- Release date: 1 September 1990
- Running time: 109 minutes
- Country: Hong Kong
- Languages: Cantonese; Mandarin; English; Polish
- Box office: HK$5,523,958

Undeclared War is a 1990 Hong Kong action film directed by Ringo Lam and starring Danny Lee, Olivia Hussey, Peter Liapis, Rosamund Kwan and Vernon G. Wells.

== Plot ==
Warsaw's liberation army is actually a terrorist organization under the banner of a revolution and in order to show their strength, they prepare to create a bombing incident when the US business delegates visit Hong Kong to achieve their political objectives. The CIA finds clues and sends Agent Gary Redner (Peter Liapis) to Hong Kong to prevent this conspiracy. Due to the matter of politics, Hong Kong Police also sends Inspector Lee Ting-bong (Danny Lee) to assist Redner in the operation. The two cops from different environment were incompatible working together at first, but they gradually produced a profound friendship and they work together to shatter the terrorists' attempt to sabotage a media organization's party killing all the Warsaw's liberation Army members. However, thing are not over yet, as Hannibal breaks into the television news department and takes all the staff hostage including Lee's girlfriend Ann (Rosamund Kwan) and prepares to create a bloodshed to be broadcast throughout the world. At this time, Lee and Redner arrives, only to find that Lee's assistant Tang (Tommy Wong) has been bribed by the terrorists and holds them at gunpoint. It ends when Tang sacrifices himself to allow the Police to capture Hannibal and detonate the grenade killing him and bringing Warsaw's liberation army to a fateful end.

== Cast ==
- Danny Lee as Inspector Lee Ting-bong
- Olivia Hussey as Rebecca Ecke
- Peter Liapis as Gary Redner (credited as Peter Lapis)
- Rosamund Kwan as Ann Cheung
- Vernon G. Wells as Hannibal
- Tommy Wong as Lieutenant Tang
- Victor Hon as Diem
- David Hedison as US Ambassador
- Louis Roth as Alex Vladovich
- Mars as Tiger
- Mark King as Simon
- Jonathan Isgar as Iam
- Dean Harrington as Callahan
- Wong Kwong-fai
- Jameson Lam as Special Branch officer
- Ng Kwok-kin as Policeman
- Suen Kwok-ming as Guard
- Chan Tat-kwong
- Ernest Mauser
- James M. Crockett
- Stuart Smith as Colin

== Release ==
Undeclared War was released in Hong Kong on 1 September 1990. The film grossed HK$5,523,958 at the Hong Kong box office during its theatrical run from 1 September to 12 September 1990.

== See also ==
- List of action films of the 1990s
- List of Hong Kong films of 1990
