= A Taste of Killing and Romance =

1994 Hong Kong film by Veronica Chan

- DVD cover
- Traditional Chinese: 殺手的童話
- Simplified Chinese: 杀手的童话
- Hanyu Pinyin: Shā Shǒu De Tóng Huà
- Jyutping: Saat3 Sau2 Dik1 Tung4 Waa2
- Directed by: Veronica Chan
- Screenplay by: Cheuk Bing
- Produced by: Veronica Chan
- Starring: Andy Lau; Anita Yuen; Christine Ng; Waise Lee; Mark Cheng
- Cinematography: Andy Fan
- Edited by: Lee Kwong-tim
- Music by: Mark Lui; Raymond Wong
- Production company: 100th Century International Entertainment
- Distributed by: Modern Films and Entertainment Production
- Release date: 5 August 1994
- Running time: 90 minutes
- Country: Hong Kong
- Language: Cantonese
- Box office: HK$5,541,985

A Taste of Killing and Romance is a 1994 Hong Kong action romantic thriller film produced and directed by Veronica Chan and starring Andy Lau and Anita Yuen as a pair of assassins who unknowingly work for the same organisation that meet and eventually fall in love. The film was released in Hong Kong on 5 August 1994. A Taste of Killing and Romance was later shown at the New Beverly Cinema on 11 December 2018 as part of a double feature with the 1997 film, The Odd One Dies.

== Plot ==
Ko Sau, a top class hitman, completes an assignment in Shanghai and returns to Hong Kong where his boss, Ice, gifts him a car and also offers him another assignment where a client offered US$300,000 to kill a tainted witness to drug smuggling case, Kwok Chung. At this time, newcomer hitwoman Yu-fung completes her first assignment killing a loan shark and bumps into Ko while fleeing from the scene and hops into his car, unaware of his identity, points her gun at him to give her a getaway, before getting off and warning to kill him if she sees him again. Ice welcomes Yu-fung to her organisation after the latter completed her assignment. Meanwhile, police inspector Tung Fai, who is in charge of protecting Kwok, leads his subordinates Dino and Wai-ma to escort Kwok to court by was ambushed by a hitman that was anticipated by Tung, who kills the hitman. As the court session proceeds, Ko has disguised himself as the judge and kills Kwok and flees while Tung give chase, but Ko manages to escape. As Ko prepares to leave Hong Kong, he runs into Yu-fung, who gives him a ride to the airport. After Ko gets off, she tells him she will kill him if she sees him for a third time, but he suddenly steps in front of car when she drives off and she dismisses him as crazy while he tells her he will stay since she is not going to kill him.

Yue Tung, one of Ice's hitman pleads her to spare him for failing an assignment, but she refuses and kills him while distracting him with her naked body. Ice also sends her assistant, Wong Cheung, to kill Tung's elderly mother, where he also kills her dog and a child girl neighbor who was visiting her. Ko then bumps into Yu-fung again in a wedding of two strangers and were dragged into dinner and mahjong by a guest married couple. Afterwards, the Ko and Yu-fung spend the night together in bed at the former's home. Meanwhile, Tung calls his informant, Ma Chi-chuen to look up hitmen organisations of Hong Kong and meets with him in an arcade where Ko was playing earlier. Afterwards, Tung goes to a disco and notices Ko. Tung unsuccessfully tries to interrogate Ko and the latter runs from him while he gives chase. Tung eventually stops Ko on a pedestrian bridge when the former pulls out his pistol, but Ko manages to escape when he jumps off the edge of the bridge and hangs on the side while Tung follows suit but lands on a moving bus.

The next day, Yu-fung arrives at Ice's art galleria to receive an assignment. As she leaves, she sees Ko who was also there to receive an assignment, unbeknownst to her and Ice notices then talking to each other. Ko and Yu-fung spends the rest of the day together while the latter was tailing her target at the same time, but they were both followed by Ice. After parting ways with Ko at night, Yu-fung executes her assignment in a restaurant. Meanwhile, Ma gives Tung Intel about Wong as a contact for hitmen, so Tung assigns Wai-ma to pose as a client to contact Wong. After discussing their plan to arrest Wong in a safehouse, Tung and Dino leaves while Wai-ma, Ma and another one of Tung's subordinate stay. However, Wong suddenly breaks him the safehouse and kills Tung's subordinate before beating and tying up Wai-ma asking the whereabouts of Ma, but stabs her to death after she refused to speak. Ma, who witnessed this while hiding, goes insane and is sent an asylum. At this time, Tung was ordered by his boss to protect rich businesses Tsui Ka-sing, much to Dino's displeasure, but Tung convinces Dino that they might have a chance to find Ko since Tsui's enemies have hired a top hitman to kill him. Tung raids Ice's art galleria and interrogates her about Wong but she denies any connection with Wong. It is then revealed that Tsui's abused wife has hired Ice to kill her husband and Ko is given the assignment.

Tsui attends a public lion dance competition at a monastery and Ko blends in as a lion dancer to execute the hit. However, Tsui notices him and he pulls out his gun and Ko does the same, but a platform collapses and they both went to save the children from getting hurt and Ko flees in a speed boat afterwards. Ko, who failed his mission gives his money back to Ice and as Wong was about to kill him, Ko shoots his arm first. Ko then declares that and if they want to kill him, set up a date and time while he will still kill Tsui for free. Ice then gives Yu-fung the assignment to kill Ko. Later Ko kills Tsui in a parking lot after temporarily luring Tung and his squad away. As Tung and his squad returns to find Tsui dead, Ko engages in a shootout with then before fleeing.

Ko dines with Yu-fung in a restaurant where she tries to break up with him, but finds herself unable to. Meanwhile, Tung and his squad raid Ko's house, but Ko anticipated it and left Tung a written welcome message. Ko spends the night with Yu-fung on a yacht and age suggests them to flee from Ice, but he states that Ice will not left them off easily and might resist against her organisation. Meanwhile, Wong kills Ice while the latter was having sex with a gigolo at a weight room. Wong finds Ko with a tracker hidden inside the remote of the car gifted to him by Ice and arrives on the yacht with his henchmen while Yu-fung was suffering an asthma attack was windsurfing. Wong stabs Yu-fung in her thigh and cuts off two of her fingers on her right hand when she refused to tell him where Ko is Ko realizes when Wong sits on Yu-fung's mobile phone. Wong hangs Yu-fung on a pole on the beach while Ko arms himself with a submachine and ties a rope on another shotgun and shoots it simultaneously at Wong and his henchmen, erupting a gunfight where he kills a number of Wong's henchmen before shooting the rope that is tying Yu-fung and brings her to safety behind a boat. At the time, Tung and squad arrive and the gunfight resumes when Wong opens fire. Ko then promises Yu-fung he will quit his career as a hitman after this is over but is shot and killed Wong right after. After Tung and his squad kill most of Wong's henchmen and arrest the rest, Wong surrenders to the police but Yu-fung takes Wong's empty pistol and points it at the police while holding Wong in front her, and the police open fire, killing both of them.

== Cast ==
- Andy Lau as Ko Sau (高守), Hong Kong's top elite hitman. His name is homophonous to 高手, which literally means "expert".
- Anita Yuen as Yu-fung (如楓), a newcomer hitwoman who grew up as in an orphanage and often makes donations to churches.
- Christine Ng as Ice, Ko Sau and Yu-fung's boss who operates an art galleria as a cover for her hitmen organisation.
- Waise Lee as Tung Fai (董輝), inspector of the Waterfront Division Police Station.
- Mark Cheng as Wong Cheung (王昌), Ice's ruthless assistant and a cold-blooded killer.
- Henry Fong as Tsui Ka-sing (徐家誠), CEO of Mediterranean Group (地中海集團) and a politician who Tung is assigned to protect after his office was trashed.
- William Tuen as Yu-fung's victim in the restaurant.
- John Ching as Yu Tung (余東), a hitman who worked for Ice and was killed by her.
- Joe Junior as a catholic priest who Ko Sau confides to and suggests Ko to have a lovelife.
- Yip Suk-ping as Mrs. Tsui (徐太), Tsui's wife who is a victim of his physical abuse and hires Ice to kill her husband.
- William So as Dino, Tung's subordinate.
- Luisa Maria Leitão as Wai-ma (慧瑪), Tung's subordinate.
- Johnny Tang as Ma Chi-chuen (馬至尊), Tung's informant.
- Cho Chung-sing as a sunglasses wearing hitman sent to kill Kwok and was gunned down by Tung.
- Chik King-man as a girl dancing with Ko in the disco.
- Danny Poon as Ice's gigolo who was killed by Wong.
- Yu Kwok-lok as Kwok Chung (郭忠), a tainted witness of a cocaine smuggling case involving Lam Kwok-hung and his brother.
- Ng Kwok-kin as Lam Kwok-hung (林國雄), a convicted cocaine smuggler.
- Chan Chi-hung as VIP at lion dance competition.
- Jack Wong
- Wong Kwan-hong
- Kong Foo-keung
- Jacky Cheung
- Edward Corbett as the police chief who is Tung's superior officer.
- Ho Chi-moon as VIP at lion dance competition.
- Lai Cheung-lung as a loanshark who is Yu-fung's target on her first assignment.
- Lee Chi-kit
- Benny Lai
- Christopher Chan
- Ng Cheung-pang

== Music ==
Song	Composer	Lyricist	Singer	Notes
After Leaving You (離開你以後)	Hiroyuki Matsuda	Calvin Poon	Andy Lau	Theme song
God Created You for Me (上帝製作您給我)	Conrad Wong	Canny Leung	William So, Canny Leung	Insert theme

== Box office ==
The film grossed HK$5,541,985 at the Hong Kong box office during its theatrical run from 5 to 29 August 1994 in Hong Kong.

== See also ==
- Andy Lau filmography
