= City on Fire (1993 film) =

1993 film directed by Chow Cheung

- Directed by: Chow Cheung
- Starring: Michiko Nishiwaki as Chia-Chi; Mark Cheng as Wei-Ming; Kong Tai-Chuen as Chiang; Lung Fei; Tai Po as Chien; Wu Ma as Police Chief
- Release date: 1993
- Country: Taiwan

City on Fire (喋血城市) is a 1993 Taiwanese action film, directed by Chow Cheung.

== Cast ==
- Michiko Nishiwaki as Chia-Chi
- Mark Cheng as Wei-Ming
- Kong Tai-Chuen as Chiang
- Lung Fei
- Tai Po as Chien
- Wu Ma as Police Chief
