= Full Contact (1992 film) =

1992 Hong Kong film by Ringo Lam

- Theatrical poster for Full Contact

Chinese name
- Traditional Chinese: 俠盜高飛
- Simplified Chinese: 俠盜高飛
- Literal meaning: Gao Fei the Rogue
Transcriptions
Standard Mandarin
- Hanyu Pinyin: Xiá Dào Gāofēi
Yue: Cantonese
- Jyutping: Hap^{6} Dou^{6} Gou^{1}fei^{1}
- Directed by: Ringo Lam
- Written by: Nam Yin
- Produced by: Ringo Lam
- Starring: Chow Yun-fat; Simon Yam; Anthony Wong; Ann Bridgewater
- Cinematography: Chan Hon-wing; Ngor Chi-kwan; Lau Hung-chuen
- Edited by: Tony Chow
- Music by: Teddy Robin
- Production company: Silver Medal Productions Ltd.
- Distributed by: Golden Princess
- Release date: 23 July 1992 (HK)
- Running time: 104 minutes
- Country: Hong Kong
- Language: Cantonese
- Box office: HK$16,793,011

Full Contact (Chinese: 俠盜高飛; lit. 'Gou Fei the Rogue') is a 1992 Hong Kong action film directed and produced by Ringo Lam, and starring Chow Yun-fat, Simon Yam, Anthony Wong, and Ann Bridgewater. It was released by Golden Princess Film Production on April 23, 1992.

Though a commercial disappointment, it was well received by critics and has developed a cult following. In 2014, Time Out ranked Full Contact in the top 100 action films of all time.

== Plot ==
In Bangkok, Gou Fei's friend Sam Sei borrows money from a loan shark to give Gou Fei's departed mother a proper burial. The loan shark kidnaps Sam, and Gou Fei rescues him by confronting the loan shark and persuading him to give more time for Sam to re-pay the loan. The loan shark does not comply and orders his cohorts to kill Sam, but Gou Fei punches two of them before he engages a knife fight with the remaining gang members. After doing so, the loan shark attempts to shoot Gou Fei, but he wrestles the gun out of the shark's grasp, frees a trapped Sam Sei and escapes. Not wanting to lose face, the loan shark promises to kill them, so Gou Fei and Sam Sei flee the city.

To earn money, they team up with Sam's cousin Judge for a heist. The group meets up, although a fight between Gou Fei's and Judge's friends (Chung and Psycho respectively) breaks out, which is triggered by Gou Fei making remarks about Lau Ngang. After the initial group meeting, Judge is offered money from the loan shark to kill Gou Fei and Sam during the heist.

The heist begins with Gou Fei blocking traffic while Lau Ngang tosses a grenade into an irate driver's car, which explodes. The intended target is a lorry and the group shoots and kills the passengers. Psycho gets in the truck, but kicks Chung out and prevents him from boarding. The heist is successful, but Judge betrays Gou Fei by attempting to kill him, only to kill Chung instead. A car chase ensues between the two. The scene ends when Gou Fei flips his car up-side down. Judge examines the wreckage only to be ambushed by Gou Fei. Another fight ensues, Judge slices Gou Fei's right finger and thumb but is interrupted by a resident who shoots in the air telling them to leave.

The stolen truck, now occupied by Lau Ngang and Psycho, shoot at the house, killing everyone but a girl. Gou Fei takes shelter, but Sam Sei appears with a gun intending to kill Gou Fei (at the behest of Judge), but shoots him once in the chest and the rest at the floor. Sam Sei walks out with a pair of bloody eyes to prove that he has "killed" Gou Fei (Judge made remarks about Gou Fei's "mesmerising eyes" earlier). Convinced, he shoots the pressure cooker, causing it to explode, burning alive the previously shot resident and the girl, leaving her with 3rd degree burns.

Gou Fei, assumed to be dead, returns to the city, finding Sam now a competent gangster. Seemingly seeking revenge, he steals the shipment of guns Judge was hoping to sell and ransoms them back. The money is for the hospital stricken girl burned in the fire fight. The pair meet again, but not before Gou Fei guns down all of Judge's cohorts including Psycho. Judge gives Gou Fei the money and asks for the goods, but Gou Fei simply detonates the goods in the end, much to Judge's chagrin. The two shoot at each other, but it's Gou Fei who gains the upper hand when he throws his butterfly knife at Judge. Gou Fei finally kills Judge before quipping "Go masturbate in hell!"

== Cast ==
- Chow Yun-fat as Gou Fei
- Simon Yam as "Judge"
- Anthony Wong as Sam Sei
- Ann Bridgewater as Mona
- Bonnie Fu as Lau Ngang
- Frankie Chan as "Psycho"
- Nam Yin as Loanshark Hung
- Victor Hon Kwan as Kau
- Chris Lee as Chung
- Chun Hung as Julianne

== Production ==
The film was shot on-location in Bangkok and Hong Kong. Lau Kar-wing was the action choreographer.

The opening scene of the film features the song "Get the Funk Out" by the American funk metal band Extreme.

== Style and themes ==
In an interview with the Hong Kong Film Archive, Lam described the difference between his more political films and Full Contact, stating that he did not want to create a film "that had anything to do with the sociological or political issues and situations of the time. I wanted to wash my hands of them and start with a clean slate. People had threatened to chop me up, accused me of having wrong political views and I didn’t want to have anything to do with those things. I wanted to make a film with a style no one could put a finger on."

== Release ==
Full Contact was released theatrically in Hong Kong on 23 July 1992. It grossed a total of HK$16,793,011.

== Reception ==
=== Critical response ===
Variety referred to the film as "Fast, fierce and gleefully tasteless" while noting that it lacked the "transcendent style" of the John Woo films starring Chow Yun-fat. The Austin Chronicle referred to the story of the film as the "more or less the same old thing" while stating that "Despite the obvious comparisons to Woo's films, Full Contact survives on its own gritty merits. It's a down-and-dirty little actioneer that leaves you squirming, breathless in your seat."

In Time Out, it was described as "Super-slick, making opportune use of Bangkok locations, and relishing every violent episode, the film's unquestionably good of its type, but also sleazy and soulless." Film 4 gave a negative review of the film, opining it was a "dated and discomforting B-movie" noting weakness in the characterization and plot. Sight & Sound stated in 1998 that the film was "Lam's most generic work" describing the first half of the film as like watching a Theatre of Cruelty. The review went on to state that the second half of the film differs: "When Chow's gunslinger returns home to find his wife living with his best friend, the film becomes a perceptive and tough-minded dissection of a romantic triangle. The shifting alliances and emotional stalemates are played out with sympathy and subtlety, suggesting a personal motivation behind the film's making."

On the review aggregator website Rotten Tomatoes, 89% of 9 critics' reviews are positive, with an average rating of 6.9/10. In 2014, Time Out polled several film critics, directors, actors and stunt actors to list their top action films. Full Contact was listed at 89th place on this list.

=== Year-end lists ===
- 10th – Stephen Hunter, The Baltimore Sun

== See also ==
- Chow Yun-fat filmography
- List of action films of the 1990s
- List of crime films of 1992
- List of Hong Kong films of 1992
