= Tony Perez (actor) =

American film and television actor

Tony Perez is an American film and television actor. Perez was born in Portsmouth, Virginia. He is best known for portraying Officer Mike Perez on Hill Street Blues from 1981 to 1985.

Perez also appeared in Lou Grant, CHiPs, The Golden Girls, L.A. Law, General Hospital, The Larry Sanders Show, NYPD Blue (S04E16), Six Feet Under, Sons of Anarchy, 24, and Once Upon a Time.

== Filmography ==
Film
Year	Title	Role	Notes
1968	Sol Madrid	Drug addict	Uncredited
1983	The Last Fight	The Referee	
1983	Scarface	Immigration Officer #2	
1988	Alien Nation	Alterez	
1989	Romero	Father Rafael Villez	
1990	Hard to Kill	Detective #1	
1992	Deep Cover	Guzman's Lawyer	
1995	The Net	Mexican Doctor	
1997	The Pest	Felix	
1997	Gang Related	Judge Pine	
1997	Looking for Lola	Jose Gomez	
1998	They Come at Night	Dr. Cordoba	
1998	Divorced White Male		
2000	Across the Line	Pedro	
2000	Auggie Rose	Detective Cole	
2001	Blow	Bank President	
2001	Blasphemy the Movie	Robert Garcia	
2002	100 Mile Rule	Cop	
2004	Perfect Opposites	Victor	
2004	Latin Dragon	Father Hernandez	
2005	Every Secret Thing	Father Mark	
2006	Right At Your Door	Alvaro	
2006	Ways of the Flesh	Dr. Gutierrez	
2007	Delta Farce	Mayor	
2010	I Will Follow	Tuliau	
2015	Close Range	Fernando Garcia	
Television
Year	Title	Role	Notes
1981-1985	Hill Street Blues	Officer Perez	21 Episodes
1996	ER	Mr. Mendoza	Episode: Fire in the Belly
1997	Murder One: Diary of a Serial Killer	Mr. Garcia	TV Mini-Series
1997	JAG	Carlos Estruga	Episode: Game of Go
1997	Murder One	Mr. Garcia	Episode: Chapter Fourteen, Year Two
1996-1997	The Sentinel	Gustavo Alcante	2 Episodes
1997-1998	NYPD Blue	Super / Det. Valenzuela	2 Episodes
2000	City of Angels		2 Episodes
2000	Son of the Beach	General Partagas	Episode: South of Her Border
2000	Dark Angel	Nathan Herrero	Episode: C.R.E.A.M.
2001	Six Feet Under	Paco's Father	Episode: Familia
2001	24	Douglas Newman	Episode:4:00 a.m.-5:00 a.m.
2002	CSI: Miami	Joe De Soto	Episode: Wet Foot/Dry Foot
2003	Carnivàle	Bartender	2 Episodes
2004	American Family	Enrique Garcia	2 Episodes
2004	Medical Investigation	Raymond Diaz	Episode: Escape
2005	Strong Medicine	Reuben Gomez	Episode: Implants, Transplants and Cuban Aunts
2005	E-Ring	Mr. Navarro	Episode: Forgotten
2007	Crossing Jordan	Man Rescued from Truck	Episode: 33 Bullets
2007	Raines	Rodrigo	Episode: Closure
2007	Studio 60 on the Sunset Strip	Howard	Episode: K&R: Part 1
2007	Burn Notice	Diego Cruz	Episode: Broken Rules
2009	Dark Blue	Jorge	Episode: K-town
2009	Sons of Anarchy	Reverend Kane	Episode: Service
2015	Battle Creek	Judge Walters	Episode: Syruptitious
2014-2016	If Loving You Is Wrong	Julius Sr	8 Episodes
2011–2017	Once Upon A Time	Prince Henry Mills	9 Episodes
