= The Seven Heroes and Five Gallants (disambiguation) =

The Seven Heroes and Five Gallants is a 19th-century Chinese novel.

The Seven Heroes and Five Gallants may also refer to:

- The Seven Heroes and Five Gallants (1972 TV series), a Taiwanese TV series produced by Taiwan Television
- The Seven Heroes and Five Gallants (1976 TV series), a Hong Kong TV series produced by Rediffusion Television
- The Seven Heroes and Five Gallants (1983 TV series), a Taiwanese TV series produced by Taiwan Television
- The Seven Heroes and Five Gallants (1994 TV series), a Taiwanese TV series produced by Chinese Television System
- The New Seven Heroes and Five Gallants (1986 TV series), a Taiwanese TV series
- The New Seven Heroes and Five Gallants (1994 TV series), a mainland Chinese TV series

== See also ==
- King Cat, a 1967 Hong Kong film also known as The Seven Heroes and Five Gallants
- Invincible Knights Errant, a 2011 Chinese TV series also known as The Seven Heroes and Five Gallants
- The Three Heroes and Five Gallants (disambiguation)
- Justice Bao (disambiguation)
