= Ding Yuehua =

Ding Yuehua 丁月華
- Wuxia character
- an illustration from an 1890 print of the novel published by Guangbaisongzhai, collection of Fudan University
- Created by: Shi Yukun

In-universe information
- Gender: Female
- Family: Ding Zhaolan, elder brother Ding Zhaohui, elder brother
- Spouse: Zhan Zhao

Ding Yuehua (丁月华, as "Moonlight") is a fictional character from the 19th-century Chinese novel The Seven Heroes and Five Gallants. She was a younger sister of the brothers Ding Zhaolan and Ding Zhaohui, and later married Zhan Zhao.

== Background ==
Ding Yuehua lived with her elder cousins Ding Zhaolan and Ding Zhaohui in Jasmine Village (茉莉村), Songjiang ever since her parents died, presumably when she was still young. Her aunt treated her like her own daughter, and the twins addressed her "sister" rather than "cousin". The twins were sons of a military general, and Ding Yuehua also became an excellent fighter with her sword named Zhanlu (湛盧).

== Betrothal to Zhan Zhao ==
Zhan Zhao is invited by Ding Zhaohui to visit the Ding Family Village. There he tries sword dancing with a famous sword from the village, Zhanlu, and remarks that Zhanlu is much lighter than his own sword, Juque. Outraged, the younger cousin Ding Yuehua challenges Zhan to a duel as she is Zhanlu's owner. Zhan is very impressed with Ding Yuehua's skills and admits defeat when she cuts off his bandanna. However, Ding Zhaolan notices that Zhan has actually cut off Ding Yuehua's earring which is much more difficult. With the blessings of the entire Ding family, Zhan and Ding Yuehua exchange swords as engagement gifts.

Zhan and Ding married later in the novel.

== Portrayal in film and television ==
- Pat Ting Hung in King Cat (1967)
- Han Hsiang-chin in Justice Pao (1974–1975)
- Sr Mau San-san in The Wrongly Killed Girl (1976)
- Lin Mei-chao in The New Seven Heroes and Five Gallants (1986)
- He Yan in The Three Heroes and Five Gallants (1991)
- Cynthia Khan in The Invincible Constable (1993)
- Ma Wen in The New Seven Heroes and Five Gallants (1994)
- Li Bingbing in Cat and Mouse (2003)
- Jin Ming in Justice Bao: The Seven Heroes and Five Gallants (2010)
- Zheng Shuang in The Three Heroes and Five Gallants (2016)
- Zhang Yuxi in Zhan Zhao Adventures (2026)
