= Mark Cheng =

Hong Kong actor

- Born: 6 October 1964 (age 61); Hong Kong
- Occupation: Actor
- Years active: 1984–present
- Spouse(s): Yukari Oshima (m. 1991; div. 1995) Ailyn Pow (m. 2002; div. 2022)
- Children: Jada Cheng

Chinese name
- Traditional Chinese: 鄭浩南
- Simplified Chinese: 郑浩南
Transcriptions
Standard Mandarin
- Hanyu Pinyin: Zhèng Hàonán
Yue: Cantonese
- Jyutping: Zeng6 Hou4-naam4

Mark Cheng Ho-nam (born 6 October 1964) is a Hong Kong actor. He made his name with his first starring role in the film Cupid One with Sally Yeh. He is also known for his role as Lam Wing in the 1996 film Tai Chi Boxer and FuXi in My Date with a Vampire III.

== Film career ==
Cheng started his career in 1984. Cinema City attempted to make Cheng a leading man in the mid-1980s, but these lead roles never made him a star. By the 1990s, he was often cast in Category III films and low budget girls with guns films.

Cheng made his Hollywood debut in the 2007 film War which stars Jet Li.

== Personal life ==
In the 1980s, Cheng dated Hong Kong actress Ann Bridgewater. In 1991, Cheng was married to Japanese actress Yukari Oshima but they divorced four years later.

Cheng had since settled down in Malaysia since 1999 with his Malaysian wife Ailyn Pow whom he met during a shoot, they have a daughter named Jada. They divorced in 2022.

== Filmography ==
=== Films ===
Year	Title	Role
1984	Mr. Virgin	
1985	Cupid One	Keung aka King Kong
1985	The Isle of Fantasy	David
1985	The Thirty Million Rush	Mark
1985	City Hero	
1986	Peking Opera Blues	Ling Pak-Hoi
1987	Evil Cat	Long
1987	Heartbeat 100	Weeny Eyes
1987	Goodbye Darling	Joe Young
1988	Gunmen	Kwong
1989	Gift from Heaven	Mark
1990	Doctor's Heart	Wong Man-Tsun
1990	Iron Butterfly, Part 2: See No Daylight	Mark
1990	Manchester Dead Warrant	
1990	A Killer's Blues	Kit
1990	Return to Action	
1990	Midnight Angel	Tak
1990	Forsaken Cop	
1990	Hong Kong Gigolo	
1990	Story of Kennedy Town	
1991	The Godfather's Daughter Mafia Blues	
1992	Kickboxer's Tears	Nan
1992	Devil Girl 18	
1992	Big Circle Blues	Wei
1992	Gambling Ghost Are Ready	
1992	1/3 Lover	Doctor
1992	Lethal Girls 2	
1993	Raped by an Angel	Chuck Chi-sing
1993	The Buddhist Spell	Feng Yun-Tin
1993	City on Fire	Wei-Ming
1993	Guns of Dragon	Prince
1994	The Modern Love	Cheung Kit
1994	A Taste of Killing and Romance	Wong Cheong
1994	The Deadly Island	Ray Tang
1994	Best of Best	Shit-Fay
1994	Underground Judgement	
1994	The Chinese Ghostbuster	
1995	Bomb Lover	Tommy Tang
1995	Dream Killer	Chan
1996	The Imp	Mark
1996	Tai Chi Boxer	Lam Wing
1996	Death Rim	
1997	The Peeping Tom	Roy Chen Chih-Lai
1998	The Longest Nite	Mark
1998	A Chinese Torture Chamber Story 2	Ma San Yee
1998	A True Mob Story	Prince
1998	Love in the River	
1998	Young and Dangerous 5	Szeto Ho-Nam
1998	Love Generation Hong Kong	Peace
1999	Trust Me U Die	Dr. Mark Chow
1999	A Man Called Hero	
2000	Prostitute Killer	
2000	Killer	Mantis
2000	Guilty or Not	Donald
2000	Undercover Blues	
2000	For Bad Boys Only	Taro Sakamoto
2002	The Wesley's Mysterious File	Kill
2005	Samuel's Last Chance	
2006	Election 2	Bo
2007	War	Wu Ti
2007	Gong Tau: An Oriental Black Magic	Officer Rockman Cheung
2007	Invisible Target	Senior Superintendent Mark Law Pui Keung
2008	Legendary Assassin	Commissioner Yu
2011	A Land Without Boundaries	
2012	Starts Good Ends Good	
2012	High Kickers	
2012	The Sword of Love	
2013	4/F Block B	
2014	Who Moved My Dream	
2015	Two Thumbs Up	Lam Tung
2016	Guigu Successor	
2019	Double World	

=== Television series ===
Year	Title	Role
1994	Heartstrings (TVB)	Thai
2001	The New Adventures of Chor Lau-heung	
2004	My Date with a Vampire III	Human King Fuxi
2005	Magic Sword of Heaven and Earth	Shunge
