= Triangle (2007 film) =

2007 Hong Kong film by Tsui Hark, Ringo Lam and Johnnie To

- Promotional poster

Chinese name
- Traditional Chinese: 鐵三角
- Simplified Chinese: 铁三角
Transcriptions
- Directed by: Tsui Hark; Ringo Lam; Johnnie To
- Written by: Half Leisure; Kenny Kan; Sharon Chung; Yau Nai-hoi; Au Kin-yee; Yip Tin-shing
- Produced by: Tsui Hark; Ringo Lam; Johnnie To
- Starring: Louis Koo; Simon Yam; Sun Honglei
- Cinematography: Cheng Siu-Keung
- Edited by: David Richardson
- Music by: Dave Klotz; Guy Zerafa
- Production companies: Milkyway Image; Media Asia Films; Film Workshop; Polybona Films; China Film Co-Production Corp.
- Distributed by: Media Asia Distribution
- Release date: 1 November 2007
- Running time: 93 minutes
- Country: Hong Kong
- Language: Cantonese

Triangle (simplified Chinese: 铁三角; traditional Chinese: 鐵三角; pinyin: tie san jiao) is a 2007 Hong Kong action film produced and directed by Tsui Hark, Ringo Lam, and Johnnie To. The film's title refers to both the acclaimed trio of filmmakers and to the uneasy brotherhood of the film's three protagonists. Triangle tells one story which is told in three thirty-minute segments, independently helmed by the three directors. It stars Louis Koo, Simon Yam and Sun Honglei as a group of friends who uncover a hidden treasure that quickly draws attention among others. The film's tagline is "Temptation. Jealousy. Destiny." Each word is often associated with the segments that appear in chronological order.

The first Hong Kong film made in a frame story format, Triangle had each director take charge of a film segment, bringing in their own production team and screenwriters to continue the story set in motion by the previous director. Critics made easy notice of the lack of continuity in between each segment, since the trio of directors did not share their scripts together while discussing the concepts.

Triangle was screened out of competition at the 2007 Cannes Film Festival. It was later released in China on 1 October 2007, which was one month before its theatrical Hong Kong release.

== Plot ==
Small-timer Fei (Louis Koo), his married buddy Sam (Simon Yam), and antique store owner Mok (Sun Hong Lei) are all in desperate need of money. Fei wants his friend to drive a robbery getaway car, but Sam backs out, throwing Fei in trouble with the triads. As the three are arguing, a mysterious man leaves them a map, leading them to an unlikely treasure under the Legislative Council building. All their financial woes seem to be solved after a late-night heist, but they are being tracked by shady cop Wen (Gordon Lam), who is carrying on an affair with Sam's emotionally unstable wife, Ling (Kelly Lin), and has connections with Fei. When the twisted relationship tangles come to light, the brotherhood dangerously breaks down and the treasure ends up in the wrong hands.

== Cast ==
- Louis Koo as Fei
- Simon Yam as Lee Bo-Sam
- Sun Honglei as Mok Shing-Yuen
- Gordon Lam as Wen
- Kelly Lin as Ling
- You Yong as Policeman
- Lam Suet as Fat Bo

== Production ==
The film was shot entirely in Hong Kong with actors from the city and Mainland China. Each director was solely responsible for one third of the film (about 30 minutes each). They did not discuss their segments with each other, and each director had a different set of writers working on each segment, the most notable being Yau Nai-hoi, Au Kin-yee and Yip Tin-shing, frequent scriptwriters for Johnnie To and his Milkyway Image films. All of the segments relied on the same editor, cinematographer and music for the sake of uniformity. David M. Richardson served as an editor, Guy Zerafa provided the film score and Cheng Siu-Keung served as cinematographer. All three had worked on To's 2006 film Exiled.

Tsui Hark was the first to start production for the film, since To and Lam agreed that it was his original concept. The initial plan was to shoot Triangle at the end of 2007, but the plan was changed due to the overwhelming positive response from a large number of European distributors. After Tsui completed the first segment of Triangle, Lam looked at the development of it before shooting the second part, then handed the film to Johnnie To, who completed the third part with the story's conclusion.

== Festival showings ==
Triangle was screened out of competition at the 2007 Cannes Film Festival. It was also screened at the Santa Barbara International Film Festival and the Seattle International Film Festival.

== Reception ==
On the review aggregator website Rotten Tomatoes, 53% of 15 critics' reviews are positive, with an average rating of 4.8/10. The website's consensus reads: "Semi-comic-action thriller Triangle teams three leading Hong Kong directors together with confusing results. For asian cinema aficionados only."
