= Ringo Lam =

Hong Kong filmmaker (1955–2018)

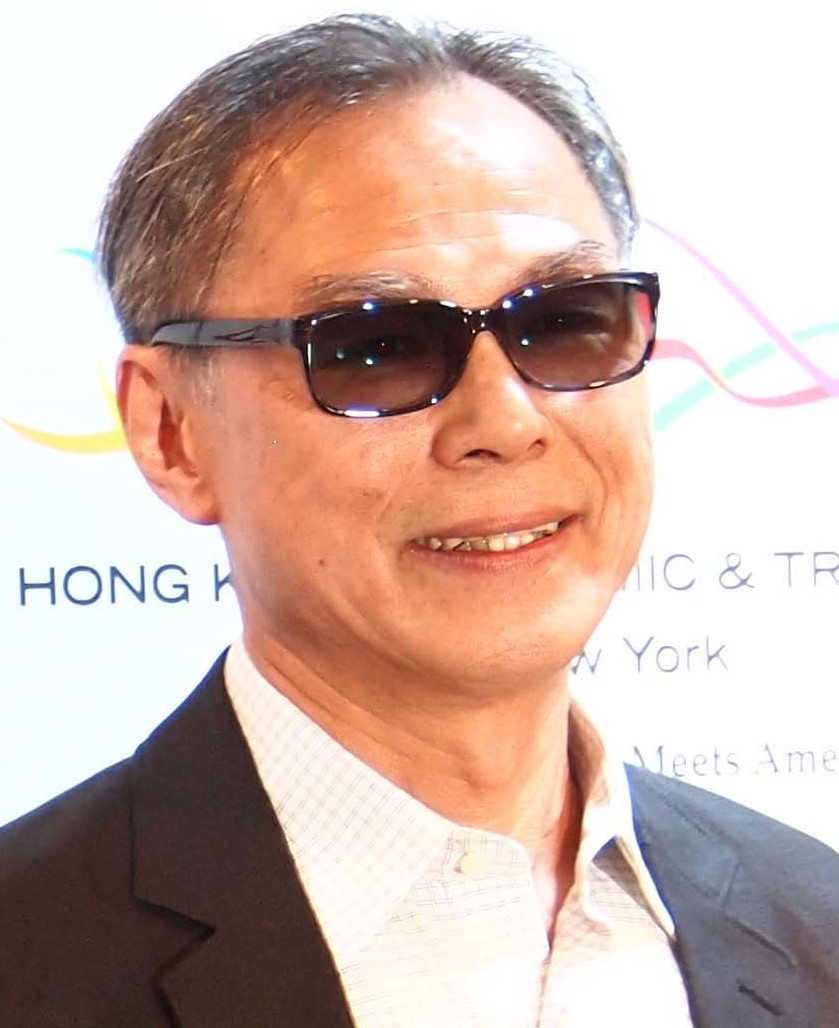
- Lam in 2015
- Born: Lam Ling-tung; 8 December 1955; British Hong Kong
- Died: 29 December 2018 (aged 63); Hong Kong
- Education: York University
- Occupations: Film director screenwriter film producer
- Years active: 1983–2018

Chinese name
- Traditional Chinese: 林嶺東
Transcriptions
Yue: Cantonese
- Jyutping: lam4 leng5 dung1

Ringo Lam Ling-Tung (simplified Chinese: 林岭东; traditional Chinese: 林嶺東; Jyutping: lam4 ling5 dung1, 8 December 1955 – 29 December 2018) was a Hong Kong filmmaker. He was known for his action and crime films produced during the Hong Kong New Wave, many of them comprising entries in the heroic bloodshed subgenre. He was nominated for six Hong Kong Film Awards, winning Best Director for his 1987 film City on Fire, which he followed with other similar films that shared a dark view of Hong Kong society, collectively known as the "On Fire" cycle.

Lam's other notable films include Aces Go Places IV (1986), Prison on Fire (1987), Undeclared War (1990), Twin Dragons (1992, co-directed with Tsui Hark), and Full Contact (1992). Many of his films starred Chow Yun-fat. He also directed several films in the United States, beginning with 1996's Maximum Risk, with Jean-Claude Van Damme. He would continue working on film productions in both Hong Kong and two more American productions with Van Damme until 2003.

In 2016, he won the Hong Kong Film Critics Society Award for Best Director for his Wild City, his first film in 8 years. His final film, a segment in the omnibus Septet: The Story of Hong Kong, was released posthumously in 2020, two years after his death.

== Early life and background ==
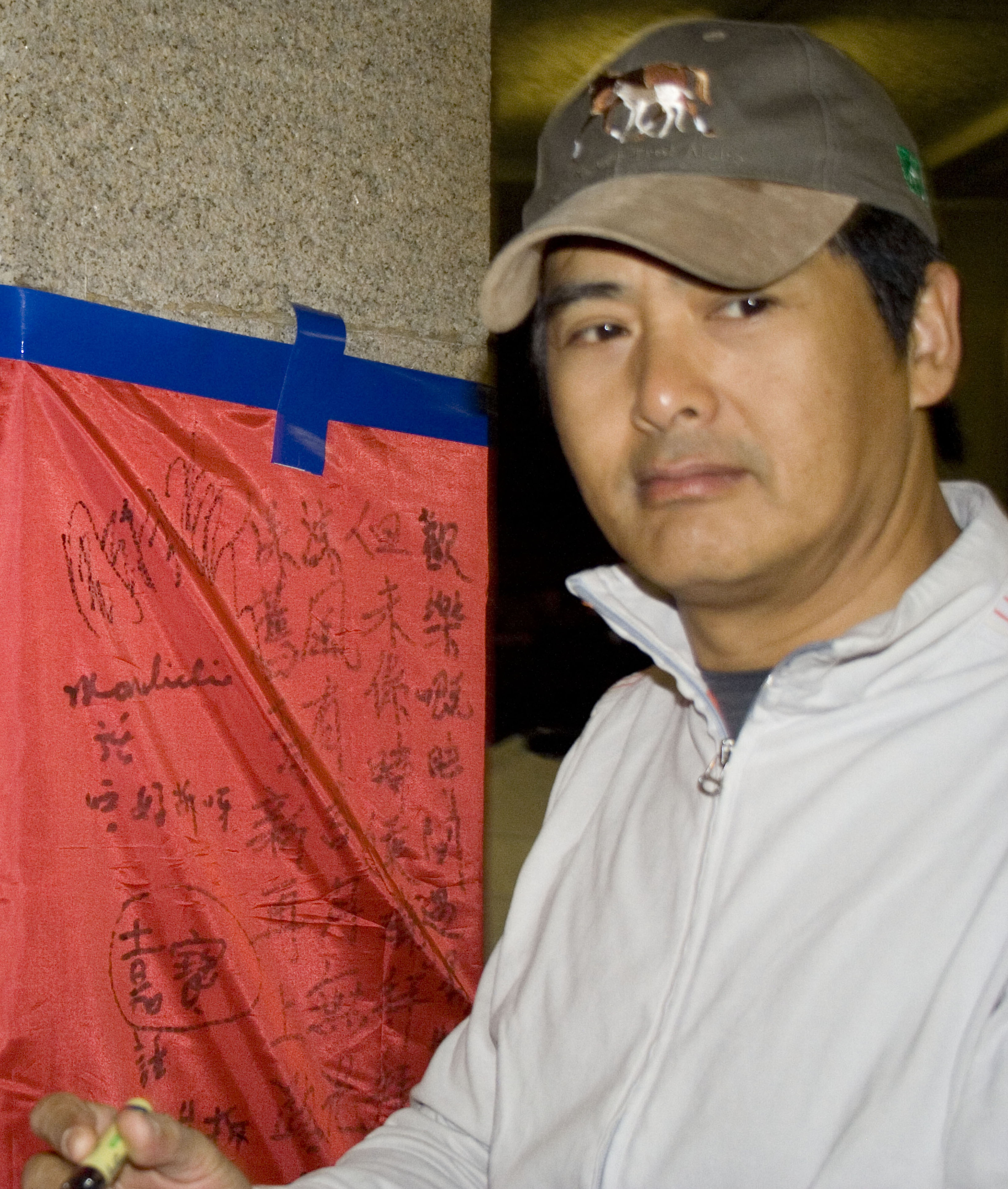
Chow Yun Fat met Lam at the actors training program. Chow has starred in many of Lam's films.

Ringo Lam was born in British Hong Kong on 8 December 1955. Lam started his career by enrolling in the TVB Actors Training Program in 1973. At the program, he met Chow Yun Fat with whom he would later collaborate on several films. He graduated from the training program in 1974 alongside Chow. After taking a few acting roles, Lam went to Canada and studied film at York University in Toronto. Lam returned to Hong Kong in 1981.

== Career ==
=== 1980s ===
Lam's first four films were not written by him. Lam took over as director for Po-Chih Leong after he had finished about one-third of the film Esprit d'amour as the film's producer Karl Maka needed a cheap replacement and hired him. Lam explained that he had "no choice, I need food, so I do the best I can ..." Lam received sole directing credit for the film. The film was released on 15 December 1983 in Hong Kong. Lam's next feature film was The Other Side of Gentleman, which was released 28 June 1984 in Hong Kong. Lam followed this with the romantic comedy film Cupid One released 1985. The film grossed HK$6,382,935, which was less than his previous two films which both grossed over ten million Hong Kong dollars. Lam's next film was the fourth film in the Aces Go Places film series, Aces Go Places IV. Lam stated in interviews that he directed the film as a favor to Karl Maka, who helped give Lam his start. The film was very successful at the box office grossing HK$27,012,748 in Hong Kong.

After Aces Go Places IV, Karl Maka allowed Lam to make whatever type of film he wanted. Lam had two films released in 1987. one of which was the first of his On Fire films, City on Fire. The film is a gangster movie which was made in Hong Kong in the footsteps of A Better Tomorrow (1986) which re-invented the gangster film genre in Hong Kong. The film was released on 13 February 1987 and earned $19,723,505 in Hong Kong. Lam won the award for Best Director award at the 1987 Hong Kong Film Awards for City on Fire. Lam's next film that year was Prison on Fire which had a script that was written in nine days while the film was shot in 20 days.

In 1988, along with Karl Maka, Lam had a brief acting role in the film The Eighth Happiness. Lam then continued his On Fire series with School on Fire which was released in Hong Kong on 20 August 1988. School on Fire was edited with many scenes censored on its release in both Hong Kong and Taiwan. Lam's final film of the 1980s was Wild Search released in 1989. It grossed a total of HK$15,944,333 in Hong Kong.

=== 1990s ===
Lam's first film of the 1990s was Undeclared War released in 1990. The film contained an international cast including Olivia Hussey, Peter Lapis, Danny Lee and Vernon Wells. The film was not as popular as Lam's previous films in Hong Kong, grossing HK$5,523,958. Lam's next film Touch and Go was released on 16 May 1991 in Hong Kong. The film was a comedy starring Sammo Hung. Lam stated in interviews that Touch and Go was an assignment took for hire in order to keep himself in the film business. The film grossed less than Undeclared War in Hong Kong. Lam released a second film in 1991 titled Prison on Fire II. The film was very popular with Hong Kong audiences where it grossed $24,367,261. Lam's next film Twin Dragons had him partnered with Tsui Hark as a director. According to Hark, Lam handled most of the action scenes in the film. Lam also briefly appears in the film as a car mechanic. Lam's next film Full Contact was released in Hong Kong on 23 July 1992. It grossed a total of HK$16,793,011. Lam followed it up with Burning Paradise which differed from his previous films by being a period film featuring the Chinese folk hero Fong Sai-yuk opposed a film set in an urban environ. The film was poorly received at the box office in Hong Kong, being the 145th highest-grossing film of the year. In 1995, Lam directed another period film set in 1975 starring Andy Lau titled The Adventurers. The film was shot partially in the Philippines and the United States and grossed HK$14,839,584 in Hong Kong.

In 1996, Lam made his American debut with the film Maximum Risk starring Jean-Claude Van Damme. The film was not a big draw at the box office. Lam returned to Hong Kong where he shot his next film Full Alert which was budgeted at $13 million. The film was shown at film festivals in 1997 including Rotterdam and Berlin. Full Alert was nominated for five awards at the Hong Kong Film Awards and won the award for best film and best actor (Lau Ching-wan) at the Hong Kong Film Critics Society Awards. Lam followed up Full Alert the next year with The Suspect which was shot in the Philippines. The Suspect was not as financially successful as Full Alert, grossing around ten million less. In 1998, Variety announced that Lam would direct the film Simon Sez with Kevin Elders. Lam later only contributed to the film as a producer. Lam directed a Hong Kong production titled Victim. The film featured a supernatural storyline and had its ending changed on its Hong Kong theatrical release. Half of the release prints contained a scene stating whether or not the actor was possessed by a ghost. The other half of the movie reflected the original script and did not reveal this.

=== 21st century ===
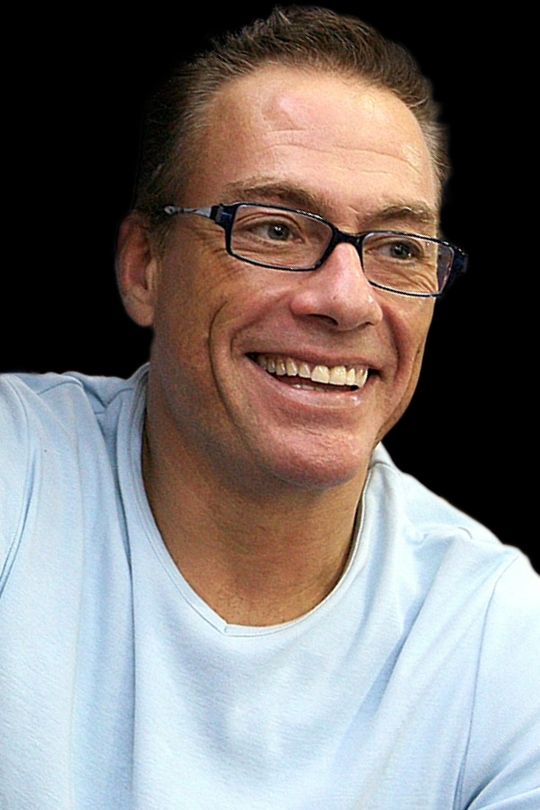
Three of Lam's films directed in the 2000s starred actor Jean-Claude Van Damme.

Lam's second U.S.-based production, Replicant, was released in 2001. The film was screened theatrically in France on 11 July 2001. The film was released direct-to-video in the United States. Lam directed two more films in 2003: the Hong Kong production Looking for Mister Perfect and the American direct-to-video release In Hell starring Jean-Claude Van Damme. Lam next took a break from filmmaking after finding dissatisfaction with the filming environment in Hong Kong after Finding Mr. Perfect did poorly in the box office. Lam also stated that he wanted to spend more time with his family and "above all, to observe people and learn more about them. I wanted to seek resources, material, and subjects that were worth making into films."

In 2007, Lam co-directed a section of the portmanteau film Triangle with Tsui Hark and Johnnie To. Lam stated that his story in the film represented "a metaphor of my attitude towards filmmaking: It is always a love-hate process." The film was screened out of competition at the Cannes Film Festival.

In 2014, the Hong Kong newspaper Apple Daily reported that Lam would return to directing with a film with funding from Mei Ah Entertainment with a cast to include Daniel Wu and Shawn Yue. The film began production in June 2014. The film marked Lam's first feature-length film in over a decade Lam's new film was titled Wild City. Lam stated that he returned to filming after his son had graduated from college and that he would "like to make films that allow me to express myself. It's a device for me to unburden myself, to get things off my chest, and also a mirror to learn more about myself through the film I made. I don't make films for money anymore." Lam attended the New York Asian Film Festival in 2015 where he was a recipient of the Lifetime Achievement Award.

Lam's last film, Sky on Fire, was released in 2016; it is the last installment in his "On Fire" series.

On 29 December 2018, Lam was confirmed dead at his Hong Kong residence at age 63, after his wife found him unresponsive in his bed. Lam had been working on a film "Eight and a Half" with Milkyway Image with Ann Hui, John Woo, Tsui Hark, Patrick Tam, Johnnie To, Sammo Hung and Yuen Woo-Ping. Each director was to create a segment based on Hong Kong history. Without Woo's segment, the film's title was changed to Septet: The Story of Hong Kong and the film was originally set for a release at the 2020 Cannes Film Festival. The film was screened at the Busan International Film Festival on 21 October 2020.

== Style ==
Lam's first four films were comedies not written by Lam. When Lam began to shoot the films he wanted to make after the success of Aces Go Places IV, he began his On Fire series. Lam chose the English titles for these films stating that it gave them "a sense of energy, of action". The films City on Fire, Prison on Fire and School on Fire do not share any characters or situations, but all have a common bleak view on Hong Kong society. In these films, Lam looks at controversial issues such as street violence and the abuse of street, prison and school systems.

Lam rarely employed Cantopop in his films. Lam's films often have Western music, such as City on Fire, which features a blues-oriented saxophone score, and Full Contact, which uses American rock music.

== Filmography ==
Ringo Lam's film appearances and roles
| Year | Title | Director | Writer | Producer | Actor | Himself | Other | Ref. |
|---|---|---|---|---|---|---|---|---|
| 1976 | You Are Wonderful | | | | Yes | | | |
| 1983 | Esprit d'amour | Yes | | | | | | |
| 1984 | The Other Side of Gentleman | Yes | | | | | | |
| 1985 | Cupid One | Yes | Yes | | | | | |
| 1986 | Aces Go Places IV | Yes | | | | | | |
| 1986 | The Thirty Million Rush | | | | | | Stunt director | |
| 1987 | City on Fire | Yes | Yes | Yes | | | | |
| 1987 | Prison on Fire | Yes | | Yes | | | | |
| 1988 | The Eighth Happiness | | | | Yes | | | |
| 1988 | School on Fire | Yes | | Yes | | | | |
| 1989 | Wild Search | Yes | | Yes | | | | |
| 1990 | Undeclared War | Yes | | Yes | | | | |
| 1990 | Rebel from China | | Yes | | | | | |
| 1991 | Touch and Go | Yes | | | | | | |
| 1991 | Prison on Fire II | Yes | | | | | | |
| 1992 | Twin Dragons | Yes | | | Yes | | | |
| 1992 | Full Contact | Yes | | Yes | | | | |
| 1994 | Burning Paradise | Yes | | | | | | |
| 1995 | The Adventurers | Yes | Yes | | | | | |
| 1996 | Maximum Risk | Yes | | | | | | |
| 1997 | Full Alert | Yes | Yes | | | | | |
| 1998 | The Suspect | Yes | Yes | | | | | |
| 1999 | Victim | Yes | Yes | | | | | |
| 1999 | Simon Sez | | | Yes | | | | |
| 2001 | Replicant | Yes | | | | | | |
| 2003 | Looking for Mister Perfect | Yes | Yes | | | | | |
| 2003 | In Hell | Yes | | | | | | |
| 2007 | Triangle | Yes | | Yes | | | | |
| 2011 | Tarantino: The Disciple of Hong Kong | | | | | Yes | | |
| 2015 | Wild City | Yes | Yes | | | | | |
| 2016 | Sky on Fire | Yes | | | | | | |
| 2020 | Septet: The Story of Hong Kong | Yes | Yes | | | | Posthumous release | |

== See also ==
- Cinema of Hong Kong
