= Michiko Nishiwaki =

Japanese actress, stuntwoman, martial artist (born 1957)

- Born: November 21, 1957 (age 68); Funabashi, Chiba, Japan
- Occupations: Actress; stuntwoman; martial artist; fight choreographer; bodybuilder; powerlifter
- Years active: 1984–present

Michiko Nishiwaki (西脇 美智子, Nishiwaki Michiko; born November 21, 1957) is a Japanese actress, stuntwoman, martial artist, fight choreographer, former female bodybuilder and powerlifter. She performed the high-risk stunts as a double for Lucy Liu in the film Charlie's Angels.

== Early life ==
Michiko Nishiwaki was born on November 21, 1957, in Funabashi, Chiba. As a teenager growing up in Tokyo, she was interested in gymnastics and volleyball. She became interested in bodybuilding when she grew dissatisfied with her body image, regarding her legs as too heavy compared to her upper body. Another turning point was her father's death, which motivated her to have her own say in the planning of her future.

== Career ==
=== Sports ===
Unusual for Japanese society at the time, Nishiwaki became a powerlifter and eventually Japan's first female powerlifting champion and first female bodybuilding champion. She opened three fitness clubs co-owned by her brother.

=== Feature films ===
Her acting career began in the 1985 Hong Kong martial arts/comedy film My Lucky Stars, in which she played a Japanese fighter. Her performance caught the attention of Jackie Chan and Sammo Hung. She also appeared in films such as The Line of Duty III in 1988, City Cops, Princess Madam, and God of Gamblers in 1989. She was quickly typecast, playing villains and femme fatales in most of her Hong Kong films. At times she did not use a word of dialogue, since she could not speak Cantonese well at the time. After returning to Japan, she went to Thailand to star in Whore and the Policewoman in 1993. She appeared in the 1999 film Man on the Moon, starring Jim Carrey, and did stunts for Hollywood films such as Red Corner, Blade, Charlie's Angels, and Rush Hour 2. She made a cameo appearance in the 2022 movie Everything Everywhere All At Once.

Nishiwaki married in 1996 and subsequently moved to Moorpark, California, where she was living with her husband and son. They separated in 2021 and eventually divorced.

== Filmography ==
List of performances and appearances by Michiko Nishiwaki in film and television
Year	Title	Role	Notes
1985	My Lucky Stars	Japanese Fighter	
1986	Jikuu Senshi Spielban; (Dimensional Warrior Spielban)	Rikkî	TV series
1987	Ojôsan tantei Tokimeki renpatsu!; (Young Lady Detectives: Heart Beat!)	Misao Matsuda	
1988	In the Line of Duty III	Michiko Nishiwaki	
1988	Tie dan xiong feng	Lily	
1989	Miao tan shuang long; (City Cops)	Michiko	
1989	God of Gamblers	Ko Chun's female Yakuza opponent	
1989	Time Burst: The Final Alliance	herself	
1990	Hu dan nu er gang; (Widow Warriors)	Chieko	
1990	Outlaw Brothers	Miego	
1990	Magic Cop	The Sorceress	
1990	Dragon Fighter; (Hard to Kill)		
1990	The Best of the Martial Arts Films	Herself	archive footage
1991	The Real Me	herself	
1991	Se jiang; (Witchcraft vs. Curse)	Simol	
1991	Sing je wai wong	herself	
1992	The Mighty Gambler	Joyce Huang (Mainlander)	
1992	Yin yao hao qing; (Hero Dream aka Naked Huntress)	Yi	
1992	Hong tin huang jia jiang; (Angel Terminators)	Miss Nishiwaki	
1992	Yun yu di liu gan; (Passionate Killing in the Dream)	Sha Sha Lee	
1992	Pi li bao zuo	herself	
1992	Huo bao da quan zi; (Big Circle Blues)	Kwan Show-Yun	
1993	Ba hai hong ying; (The Avenging Quartet)	Sen	
1993	Fatal Seduction	herself	
1993	Ging fa yu lau ang; (Whore and Policewoman)	Nancy Cheng	
1993	City on Fire	Chia-Chi	
1996	Top Fighter 2	Herself (archive footage)	
1998	Lethal Weapon 4	herself	
1999	Man on the Moon	Female Karate Fighter (uncredited)	
2000	Charlie's Angels	stunt double for Lucy Liu	
2003	Ghost Rock	Hana	
2022	Everything Everywhere All at Once	Kung Fu Competitor, Co-Star	

== Stunt and stunt double appearances ==
List of stunt and stunt double appearances in film stunts
Year	Title
1997	Red Corner
1998	Brave New World
1998	Blade
1998	Fantasy Island: Estrogen
1998–2000	Martial Law (TV series)
1999	Man on the Moon
1999	Play It to the Bone
2000	Chain of Command
2001	V.I.P - Crouching Tiger, Hidden Val (TV Series (November 24, 2001))
2001	Rush Hour 2
2002	The Practice - M. Premie Unplugged (TV series)
2002	Clockstoppers
2002	The Scorpion King
2003	Kill Bill: Volume 1 (2003)
2004	Kill Bill: Volume 2 (2004)
2004	Collateral
2005	Memoirs of a Geisha
2006	Mission: Impossible III
