= Isaac Florentine =

Israeli film director

- יצחק פלורנטין
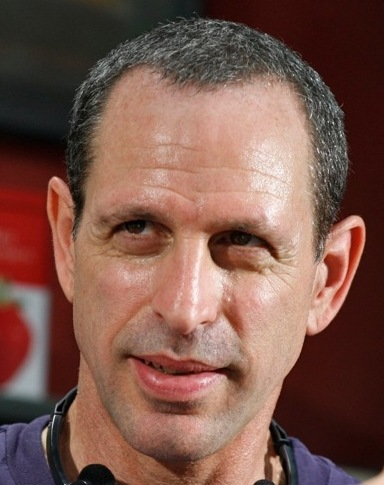
- Florentine in 2008
- Born: 28 July 1958 (age 68); Israel
- Education: Tel Aviv University
- Occupation: Film director
- Years active: 1987–present

Isaac Florentine (Hebrew: יצחק פלורנטין; born 28 July 1958) is an Israeli film director. He is best known for his martial arts and action genre films, namely Undisputed II: Last Man Standing (2006), Undisputed III: Redemption (2010), Ninja (2009), Ninja: Shadow of a Tear (2013) and Close Range (2015). Florentine completed his degree in Film & Television from Tel Aviv University.

== Early life ==
Florentine regularly visited local cinemas throughout his childhood in Israel, citing Sergio Leone and Bruce Lee as his biggest idols and subsequent film influences. As a young man he completed mandatory service in the Israeli Army for three years before studying Film & Television at Tel Aviv University. He also trained in martial arts since his childhood, learning judo and karate from the styles Kyokushin, Shito-ryu and Goju-Kai, and started teaching karate in 1978 before opening his own school in 1979, where he also trains regularly to this day. While studying at University he completed his first short film, Farewell Terminator (1987), which notably won seven awards at Mograbee Film Festival.

== Career ==
In 1988 he moved to America with his family to pursue a career in film. His first break came from meeting producers Ronnie Hadar and Jonathan Tzachor who invited him to join the production team behind TV series Mighty Morphin' Power Rangers as a stunt coordinator and second unit director. After seeing his first short film, Cannon Films' Menahem Golan also offered Florentine the chance to direct his first feature film, Desert Kickboxer (1992).

Florentine is positive of his time on Power Rangers where he honed many skills and filmmaking techniques. However, he would not embrace his now recognised directing style, shooting with minimal, clean edits in the mould of his other idols Buster Keaton and Charlie Chaplin, until his third feature film, High Voltage (1997).

As a next major step in his work, he cast young British actor Scott Adkins in a supporting role for Special Forces (2003), having received his demo tape, and it would mark the first of many collaborations, including producing, directing and even second unit directing, launching Adkins' career.

Florentine also directed the documentary The Life and Legend of Bob Wall (2003) and second unit directed The Legend of Hercules (2014).

== Filmography ==
=== Acting ===
- Farewell, Terminator
- Marilyn Hotchkiss' Ballroom Dancing and Charm School
- Acts of Vengeance

=== Directing ===
- Farewell, Terminator (short-1987)
- Desert Kickboxer (1992)
- Savate (1995)
- Power Rangers Zeo: Zeo Quest (1996)
- High Voltage (1997)
- Bridge of Dragons (1999)
- Cold Harvest (1999)
- Power Rangers Time Force - Quantum Ranger: Clash for Control (2001)
- U.S. Seals II: The Ultimate Force (2001)
- Special Forces (2003)
- The Life and Legend of Bob Wall (2003)
- Max Havoc: Curse of the Dragon (2004)-(final scenes)
- Undisputed II: Last Man Standing (2006)
- The Shepherd: Border Patrol (2008)
- Ninja (2009)
- Undisputed III: Redemption (2010)
- Assassin's Bullet (2012)
- Ninja: Shadow of a Tear (2014)
- Close Range (2015)
- Boyka: Undisputed (2016-uncredited)
- Acts of Vengeance (2017)
- Seized (2020)
- Hounds of War (2024)
- Hellfire (2026)

=== Other ===
- Power Rangers Megaforce - (2013-2014) - Consultant
- The Legend of Hercules - (2014) - Second Unit Director
- Boyka: Undisputed (2017) - Producer
- 211 (2018) - Producer

== Awards ==
Year	Nominated work	Award	Category	Results
2010	Undisputed III: Redemption	ActionFest	Best Director	Won
2010	Undisputed III: Redemption	Action on Film International Film Festival	Best Director	Nominated
