= List of action films of the 1980s =

This is chronological list of action films released in the 1980s. Often there may be considerable overlap particularly between action and other genres (including horror, comedy and science fiction films); the list should attempt to document films which are more closely related to action, even if they blend genres.

Title	Director	Cast	Country	Subgenre/notes
1980
2 Champions of Shaolin	Chang Cheh	Lu Feng, Lo Mang, Chiang Sheng	Hong Kong	Martial arts film
Ang Agila at ang Falcon	Armando Herrera	Fernando Poe Jr., Tony Ferrer	Philippines	
Any Which Way You Can	Buddy Van Horn	Clint Eastwood, Sondra Locke, Geoffrey Lewis	United States	Action comedy
The Big Brawl	Robert Clouse	Jackie Chan, José Ferrer, Kristine de Bell	United States	
The Blues Brothers	John Landis	John Belushi, Dan Aykroyd,	United States	Action comedy
Clan of the White Lotus	Lo Lieh	Gordon Liu, Lo Lieh, Hui Ya-hung	Hong Kong	
Delitto a Porta Romana	Bruno Corbucci	Tomas Milian	Italy	Action thriller
The Empire Strikes Back	Irvin Kershner	Mark Hamill, Harrison Ford, Carrie Fisher, Billy Dee Williams	United States	Science fiction action
Encounters of the Spooky Kind	Sammo Hung	Sammo Hung, Chung Fat, Chan Lung	Hong Kong	Martial arts film
The Exterminator	James Glickenhaus	Christopher George, Samantha Eggar, Robert Ginty	United States	
Flag of Iron	Chang Cheh	Chiang Sheng, Guan Feng, Philip Kwok	Hong Kong	
Flash Gordon	Mike Hodges	Sam J. Jones, Melody Anderson, Chaim Topol	United States; United Kingdom	Science fiction action
The Hunter	Buzz Kulik	Steve McQueen, Eli Wallach, Kathryn Harrold	United States	Action thriller
Kalibre 45	Nilo Saez	Fernando Poe, Jr., Lito Lapid, Jennifer Cortes	Philippines	
Le Guignolo	Georges Lautner	Jean-Paul Belmondo, Michel Galabru	France; Italy	Action comedy
The Master	Tony Liu	Chan Lau, Chang Lin, Chen Kuan-Tai	Hong Kong	
The Octagon	Eric Karson	Chuck Norris, Lee Van Cleef	United States	
The Rebel Intruders	Chang Cheh	Philip Kwok, Chiang Sheng, Lo Meng	Hong Kong	
Return to the 36th Chamber	Lau Kar-Leung	Gordon Liu	Hong Kong	
Smokey and the Bandit II	Hal Needham	Burt Reynolds, Jackie Gleason, Jerry Reed	United States	Action comedy
Superman II	Richard Lester	Christopher Reeve, Gene Hackman, Margot Kidder, Terence Stamp	United Kingdom; United States	Superhero film
The Sword	Patrick Tam	Lee Kwan-hak, Jimmy Wang Yu, Chan Pooi-Ling	Hong Kong	Martial arts film
Trois Hommes à Abattre	Jacques Deray	Alain Delon	France	Action thriller
The Victim	Sammo Hung	Sammo Hung, Yuen Biao, Dick Wei	Hong Kong	Martial arts comedy
The Young Master	Jackie Chan	Jackie Chan, Yuan Biao, Wei Pai	Hong Kong	
1981
Alfredo Sebastian	Leonardo L. Garcia	Ramon Revilla, Eddie Garcia, George Estregan, Nick Romano	Philippines	Biographical action
Boy Nazareno	Teody Recio	Rhene Imperial, Beth Bautista, Azenith Briones	Philippines	Biographical action thriller
The Cannonball Run	Hal Needham	Burt Reynolds, Roger Moore, Farrah Fawcett	United States	Action comedy
Condorman	Charles Jarrott	Michael Crawford, Oliver Reed, Barbara Carrera	United States	Superhero film, action thriller
Deadly Brothers	Cesar Gallardo	Rudy Fernandez, Phillip Salvador	Philippines	Action thriller
The Emperor and His Brother	Chor Yuen	Ti Lung, Lo Lieh, Ku Feng	Hong Kong	Martial arts film
Enter the Ninja	Menahem Golan	Franco Nero, Susan George, Sho Kosugi, Christopher George	United States	
Escape from New York	John Carpenter	Kurt Russell, Lee Van Cleef, Ernest Borgnine, Donald Pleasence, Isaac Hayes	United States	Science fiction action
An Eye for an Eye	Steve Carver	Chuck Norris, Christopher Lee, Richard Roundtree	United States	Martial arts film
For Your Eyes Only	John Glen	Roger Moore, Carole Bouquet, Chaim Topol, Julian Glover	United Kingdom	Action Thriller
Force: Five	Robert Clouse	Joe Lewis, Richard Norton, Benny Urquidez	United States	Martial arts film
Game of Death II	Ng See Yuen	Tang Lung	Hong Kong	
Kaliwete Brothers	Jerry Tirazona, Manuel Marcos	Efren Reyes Jr., Jess Lapid Jr.	Philippines	
Kamandag ng Rehas na Bakal	Nilo Saez	Phillip Salvador, Conrad Poe, Ace Vergel	Philippines	
Kill and Kill Again	Ivan Hall	James Ryan, Anneline Kriel, Stan Schmidt	South Africa United States	Martial arts film
Knightriders	George A. Romero	Ed Harris, Tom Savini	United States	
Le Professionnel	Georges Lautner	Jean-Paul Belmondo, Robert Hossein	France	Action thriller
Lion vs. Lion	Chien Yuen Sheng	Wang Lung-wei, Lo Mang, Wong Yue	Hong Kong	Martial arts film
Lovely But Deadly	David Sheldon	Lucinda Dooling, John Randolph, Mel Novak	United States	Martial arts film
Mad Max 2	George Miller	Mel Gibson	Australia	
Masked Avengers	Chang Cheh	Philip Kwok, Lu Feng, Chiang Sheng	Hong Kong	Martial arts film
My Young Auntie	Liu Chia-Liang	Liu Chia-Liang, Hui Ying-Hung, Liu Chia-hui	Hong Kong	Action comedy, martial arts film
Nighthawks	Bruce Malmuth	Sylvester Stallone, Billy Dee Williams, Rutger Hauer	United States	Action thriller
Outland	Peter Hyams	Sean Connery, Frances Sternhagen, Peter Boyle	United States	Science fiction action
The Prodigal Son	Sammo Hung	Yuen Biao, Frankie Chan, Lam Ching-ying	Hong Kong	Martial arts film
Raiders of the Lost Ark	Steven Spielberg	Harrison Ford, Karen Allen, Denholm Elliott, John Rhys-Davies	United States	
Sharky's Machine	Burt Reynolds	Burt Reynolds, Vittorio Gassman, Rachel Ward, Henry Silva	United States	Action thriller
Southern Comfort	Walter Hill	Keith Carradine, Powers Boothe, Fred Ward, Peter Coyote	United States	Action thriller
1982
1990: The Bronx Warriors	Enzo G. Castellari	Vic Morrow, Christopher Connelly, Fred Williamson, Mark Gregory	Italy	Science fiction action
48 Hrs.	Walter Hill	Nick Nolte, Eddie Murphy	United States	Action comedy
Anno 2020 - I gladiatori del futuro	Joe D'Amato	Al Cliver, Sabrina Siani, Peter Hooten	Italy	Science fiction action
Burst City	Sogo Ishii	Takanori Jinnai	Japan	
Carry On Pickpocket	Sammo Hung	Frankie Chan, Sammo Hung, Richard Ng	Hong Kong	
The Challenge	John Frankenheimer	Scott Glenn, Toshirō Mifune	United States	Martial arts film
Class of 1984	Mark L. Lester	Perry King, Timothy Van Patten, Merrie Lynn Ross	Canada	Action thriller
Conan the Barbarian	John Milius	Arnold Schwarzenegger, James Earl Jones, Sandahl Bergman, Max von Sydow	United States	
The Dead and the Deadly	Wu Ma	Cherie Chung, Sammo Hung, Lam Ching-ying	Hong Kong	Action comedy, martial arts film
Death Wish 2	Michael Winner	Charles Bronson, Jill Ireland, Vincent Gardenia	United States	Action thriller
Dragon Lord	Jackie Chan	Jackie Chan, Chen Hui-Min, Mars	Hong Kong	
Firefox	Clint Eastwood	Clint Eastwood	United States	
First Blood	Ted Kotcheff	Sylvester Stallone, Brian Dennehy, Richard Crenna	United States	Action thriller
Five Element Ninjas	Chang Cheh	Chen Pei Hsi, Cheng Tien Chi, Chu Ke	Hong Kong	
Forced Vengeance	James Fargo	Chuck Norris, Mary Louise Weller	United States	Action thriller, martial arts film
Get My Son Dead or Alive	Pepe Marcos	Eddie Garcia, Rudy Fernandez, Vic Vargas	Philippines	Action thriller
Human Lanterns	Sun Chung	Lo Lieh, Chen Kuan-Tai, Lo Mang	Hong Kong	
The Junkman	H. B. Halicki	H. B. Halicki, Christopher Stone, Susan Shaw	United States	Action comedy
Legendary Weapons of China	Liu Chia-Liang	Alexander Fu Sheng, Lee Shao Hwa, Liu Chia-Liang	Hong Kong	
Ninja in the Dragon's Den	Corey Yuen	Conan Lee, Hiroyuki Sanada, Hwang Jang-lee	Hong Kong	Martial arts Film
One Down Two to Go	Fred Williamson	Fred Williamson, Jim Brown, Jim Kelly, Richard Roundtree	United States	
Running on Empty	John Clark	Terry Serio, Deborah Conway, Geoff Rhoe	Australia	
Shaolin Temple	Cheung Yam Yim	Jet Li	Hong Kong	Martial arts film
Silent Rage	Michael Miller	Chuck Norris, Ron Silver, Steven Keats	United States	
The Soldier	James Glickenhaus	Ken Wahl, Klaus Kinski, Alberta Watson	United States	
Tron	Steven Lisberger	Jeff Bridges, Bruce Boxleitner, Cindy Morgan, David Warner	United States	Science fiction action
Turkey Shoot	Brian Trenchard-Smith	Steve Railsback, Olivia Hussey, Michael Craig	Australia	Action thriller
Warlords of the 21st Century	Harley Cokliss	Michael Beck, Annie McEnroe, James Wainwright	United States	
1983
10 to Midnight	J. Lee Thompson	Charles Bronson, Lisa Eilbacher, Andrew Stevens	United States	Action thriller
2019, After the Fall of New York	Sergio Martino	Michael Sopkiw, Valentine Monnier, Anna Kanakis,	Italy; France	Science fiction action
Bastard Swordsman	Lu Chun-ku	Norman Chu, Tony Liu, Wong Yung	Hong Kong	
Blue Thunder	John Badham	Roy Scheider, Malcolm McDowell, Warren Oates, Candy Clark	United States	
The Boxer's Omen	Kuei Chi Hung	Bolo Yeung, Lung Wei Wang	Hong Kong	
Digmaan Sa Pagitan ng Langit at Lupa	Tony Y. Reyes	Efren Reyes Jr., Roy Flores, Baldo Marro, Dick Israel	Philippines	
Dope Godfather	Junn Cabrera	Tony Ferrer, Vic Vargas	Philippines	Action thriller
Duel to the Death	Ching Siu-tung	Norman Chu, Damian Lau	Hong Kong	Martial arts film
Dugong Buhay	Carlo J. Caparas	Ramon Revilla, Ramon "Bong" Revilla Jr., Eula Valdez	Philippines	
The Eight Diagram Pole Fighter	Lau Kar-leung	Alexander Fu Sheng, Gordon Liu	Hong Kong	
Endgame	Joe D'Amato	Al Cliver, Laura Gemser, George Eastman	Italy	Science fiction action
Escape from the Bronx	Enzo G. Castellari	Mark Gregory, Henry Silva	Italy	
Exterminators of the Year 3000	Giuliano Carmineo	Robert Jannucci, Alicia Moro, Eduardo Fajardo	Italy; Spain; United States	
Fearless Hyena Part II	Chuen Chan	Jackie Chan	Hong Kong	
Go for It	Enzo Barboni	Terence Hill, Bud Spencer	Italy	
Golgo 13: The Professional	Osamu Dezaki, Shichiro Kobayashi, Hirokazu Takahashi		Japan	
Holy Flame of the Martial World	Lu Chun-ku	Candy Wen Hsueh-Erh, Huang Min-Yi, Kuo Chue	Hong Kong	
Isang Bala Ka Lang!	Ronwaldo Reyes	Fernando Poe Jr., Marianne Dela Riva, Julie Vega, Paquito Diaz, Johnny Wilson, King Gutierrez	Philippines	
Le Marginal	Jacques Deray	Jean-Paul Belmondo, Henry Silva	France	Action thriller
Lone Wolf McQuade	Steve Carver	Chuck Norris, David Carradine, Barbara Carrera	United States	
Never Say Never Again	Irvin Kershner	Sean Connery, Klaus Maria Brandauer, Kim Basinger, Max von Sydow, Barbara Carrera	United States	
The New Barbarians	Enzo G. Castellari	Fred Williamson, Anna Kanakis, George Eastman	Italy	Science fiction action
Octopussy	John Glen	Roger Moore, Maud Adams, Louis Jourdan, Steven Berkoff, Kabir Bedi	United Kingdom	Action thriller
Over My Dead Body	Arsenio Bautista	Tony Ferrer, Efren Reyes Jr., Bembol Roco	Philippines	Action thriller
Project A	Jackie Chan	Jackie Chan, Sammo Hung, Yuen Biao	Hong Kong	Martial arts film
Public Enemy No. 1	Arsenio "Boots" Bautista	Bembol Roco, Laarni Enriquez, Raoul Aragonn, Charlie Davao	Philippines	
Return of the Jedi	Richard Marquand	Mark Hamill, Harrison Ford, Carrie Fisher, Billy Dee Williams	United States	Science fiction action
Revenge of the Ninja	Sam Firstenberg	Sho Kosugi, Keith Vitali, Virgil Frye	United States	
Scarface	Brian De Palma	Al Pacino, Michelle Pfeiffer, Mary Elizabeth Mastrantonio, Steven Bauer	United States	Crime action
Shaolin Drunkard	Yuen Woo Ping	Simon Yuen, Yuen Cheung-Yan	Hong Kong	
Smokey and the Bandit 3	Dick Lowry	Jackie Gleason, Jerry Reed, Mike Henry	United States	
Stroker Ace	Hal Needham	Burt Reynolds, Ned Beatty	United States	
Sudden Impact	Clint Eastwood	Clint Eastwood, Sondra Locke, Pat Hingle	United States	Action thriller
Superman III	Richard Lester	Christopher Reeve, Richard Pryor, Robert Vaughn	United States	Superhero film
Surigao Tragedy	Johnny Wood	Rey Malonzo, Marilou Bendigo, Freddie Poe	Philippines	
Umpisahan Mo, Tatapusin Ko	Ronwaldo Reyes	Fernando Poe Jr., Baby Delgado, Paquito Diaz	Philippines	Action thriller
Uncommon Valor	Ted Kotcheff	Gene Hackman, Robert Stack, Fred Ward	United States	
Vigilante	William Lustig	Robert Forster, Fred Williamson, Richard Bright	United States	Action thriller
Zu Warriors from the Magic Mountain	Tsui Hark	Yuen Biao, Tsui Siu Keung, Sammo Hung	Hong Kong	
1984
The Adventures of Buckaroo Banzai Across the 8th Dimension	W. D. Richter	Peter Weller, John Lithgow, Ellen Barkin	United States	Action comedy
Alley Cat	Victor M. Ordonez, Eduardo Palmos, Al Valletta	Karin Mani, Robert Torti	United States	
Batiguas II: Pasukuin si Waway	Manuel "Fyke" Cinco	Rudy Fernandez, George Estregan, Maria Isabel Lopez, Ronnie Lazaro	Philippines	Biographical action thriller
Beverly Hills Cop	Martin Brest	Eddie Murphy, Judge Reinhold, Steven Berkoff	United States	Action comedy
Blastfighter	Lamberto Bava	Michael Sopkiw, Valerie Blake, George Eastman	Italy; France	Action thriller
A Breed Apart	Philippe Mora	Rutger Hauer, Kathleen Turner, Powers Boothe, Donald Pleasence	United States	
Cannonball Run II	Hal Needham	Burt Reynolds, Dom DeLuise, Shirley MacLaine	United States	Action comedy
City Heat	Richard Benjamin	Clint Eastwood, Burt Reynolds	United States	
Code Name: Wild Geese	Antonio Margheriti	Lewis Collins, Lee Van Cleef, Ernest Borgnine	Italy; West Germany	
Conan the Destroyer	Richard Fleischer	Arnold Schwarzenegger, Grace Jones, Wilt Chamberlain	United States	
The Exterminator 2	Mark Buntzman, William Sachs	Robert Ginty, Mario Van Peebles, Deborah Geffner	United States	Action thriller
The Final Executioner	Romolo Guerrieri	William Mang, Marina Costa, Harrison Muller	Italy	
Firestarter	Mark L. Lester	David Keith, Drew Barrymore, George C. Scott	United States	Action thriller
Gimtong Araw ni... Boy Madrigal	Carlos Diaz	Rhene Imperial, Tanya Gomez, Marissa del Mar, Donna Villa, George Estregan	Philippines	
Indiana Jones and the Temple of Doom	Steven Spielberg	Harrison Ford, Kate Capshaw, Amrish Puri	United States	
Ka Freddie	Roland Ledesma	Rhene Imperial, Tanya Gomez, Dante Rivero, Rhey Roldan, George Estregan	Philippines	
Kids From Shaolin	Cheung Yam Yim	Jet Li	Hong Kong	
Kumusta Ka Hudas?	Augusto Buenaventura	Rudy Fernandez, Ace Vergel	Philippines	
Missing in Action	Joseph Zito	Chuck Norris, M. Emmet Walsh, Lenore Kasdorf	United States	Action thriller
Ninja III: The Domination	Sam Firstenberg	Lucinda Dickey, Jordan Bennett, Sho Kosugi	United States	
The Ninja Mission	Mats Helge	Curt Brober, Christopher Kohlberg, Hanna Pola	Sweden; United Kingdom	
Padre Hudas	Joey del Rosario	Dante Varona, Jean Saburit, Vic Vargas, Ruel Vernal, Rex Lapid	Philippines	
Raiders of the Shaolin Temple	Godfrey Ho		Taiwan	
Revenge of the Drunken Master	Godfrey Ho	Chen Hui Liu, Wen Chiang Lung	Hong Kong	
Roadhouse 66	John Mark Robinson	Willem Dafoe, Judge Reinhold	United States	
Runaway	Michael Crichton	Tom Selleck, Gene Simmons, Cynthia Rhodes	United States	Science fiction action
Sarge	Tony Reyes	Rudy Fernandez, Phillip Salvador, Efren Reyes Jr., Baldo Marro	Philippines	
Sekreta Ini	Angel Labra	Redford White, Yusuf Salim, Pia Moran	Philippines	Action comedy
Sheena	John Guillermin	Tanya Roberts, Ted Wass, Donovan Scott	United States	
Streets of Fire	Walter Hill	Michael Paré, Diane Lane, Willem Dafoe	United States	
The Terminator	James Cameron	Arnold Schwarzenegger, Linda Hamilton, Michael Biehn	United States	
The Toxic Avenger	Lloyd Kaufman, Michael Herz	Mitch Cohen, Mark Torgl, Andree Maranda	United States	Action comedy
Toy Soldiers	David Andrew Fisher	Jason Miller, Cleavon Little, Terri Garber	United States	
Wheels on Meals	Sammo Hung	Jackie Chan, Yuen Biao, Sammo Hung	Hong Kong	Action comedy, martial arts film
1985
American Ninja	Sam Firstenberg	Michael Dudikoff, Steve James, John Fujioka	United States	
Bagets Gang	Augusto Buenaventura	Jinggoy Estrada, Rio Locsin, Robin Padilla	Philippines	Biographical action
Baun Gang	Pepe Marcos	Rudy Fernandez, Marilou Bendigo, Beth Bautista	Philippines	Biographical action
Black Moon Rising	Harley Cokliss	Tommy Lee Jones, Linda Hamilton, Robert Vaughn	United States	
Bomba Arienda	Mel Chionglo	Ace Vergel, Carmi Martin, Charito Solis	Philippines	Biographical action
Calapan Jailbreak	Jun Gallardo	Lito Lapid, Rudy Fernandez, Rhene Imperial	Philippines	Biographical action
Code of Silence	Andrew Davis	Chuck Norris, Henry Silva, Bert Remsen	United States	
Commando	Mark L. Lester	Arnold Schwarzenegger, Vernon Wells, Bill Duke	United States	
Death Wish 3	Michael Winner	Charles Bronson, Deborah Raffin, Ed Lauter	United States	
Disciples of the 36th Chamber	Lau Kar-leung	Hsiao Ho, Gordon Liu	Hong Kong	
Enemy Mine	Wolfgang Petersen	Dennis Quaid, Louis Gossett Jr., Brion James	United States	Science fiction action
Goat Buster: Sa Templo ni Dune	Ben Feleo	Dolphy, Gloria Diaz, Nanette Inventor	Philippines	Action comedy
Gymkata	Robert Clouse	Kurt Thomas, Tetchie Agbayani, Richard Norton	United States	Martial arts film
Heart of Dragon	Sammo Hung	Jackie Chan, Sammo Hung, Emily Chu	Hong Kong	
Hulihin si Mortemer "Bitoy" Marcelo: Celeste Gang	Nilo Saez	Ramon "Bong" Revilla Jr., Lani Mercado, Lyka Ugarte	Philippines	Biographical action
Invasion U.S.A.	Joseph Zito	Chuck Norris, Richard Lynch, Melissa Prophet	United States	
King Solomon's Mines	J. Lee Thompson	Richard Chamberlain, Sharon Stone, Herbert Lom, John Rhys-Davies	United States	
The Last Dragon	Michael Schultz	Taimak, Vanity, Christopher Murney	United States	
Les Spécialistes	Patrice Leconte	Gérard Lanvin, Bernard Giraudeau	France	Action comedy
Light Blast	Enzo G. Castellari	Erik Estrada	Italy	
Mad Max Beyond Thunderdome	George Ogilvie, George Miller	Mel Gibson, Tina Turner	Australia	
Malibu Express	Andy Sidaris	Darby Hinton, Sybil Danning, Art Metrano	United States	
Manila Gang War	Wilfredo Milan	Anthony Alonzo, Jess Lapid Jr., Bembol Roco	Philippines	Biographical action
Missing in Action 2: The Beginning	Lance Hool	Chuck Norris, Soon-Teck Oh, Cosie Costa	United States	
Mr. Vampire	Ricky Lau	Ricky Hui, Moon Lee, Chin Suit Ho	Hong Kong	
My Lucky Stars	Sammo Hung	Richard Harrison, Hwang Jang Lee	Hong Kong	
Ninja Terminator	Godfrey Ho	Jackie Chan, Yuen Biao	United States	
Parole de flic	José Pinheiro	Alain Delon	France	
Partida	Ben Yalung	Fernando Poe Jr.	Philippines	Action thriller
Police Story	Jackie Chan	Jackie Chan, Maggie Cheung, Cho Yuen	Hong Kong	
Pray for Death	Gordon Hessler	Sho Kosugi, James Booth, Norman Burton, Michael Constantine	United States	Martial arts film
The Protector	James Glickenhaus	Jackie Chan, Danny Aiello, Roy Chiao	Hong Kong; United States	
Rambo: First Blood Part II	George Pan Cosmatos	Sylvester Stallone, Richard Crenna, Charles Napier	United States	
Red Sonja	Richard Fleischer	Arnold Schwarzenegger, Brigitte Nielsen, Sandahl Bergman	United States	
Remo Williams: The Adventure Begins	Guy Hamilton	Fred Ward, Joel Grey, Wilford Brimley	United States	
Runaway Train	Andrei Konchalovsky	Jon Voight, Eric Roberts, Rebecca De Mornay	United States	
Sigue-Sigue Brothers	Jun Gallardo	Rhene Imperial, Efren Reyes Jr., Bembol Roco	Philippines	
Spies Like Us	John Landis	Chevy Chase, Dan Aykroyd	United States	
Target	Arthur Penn	Gene Hackman, Matt Dillon, Gayle Hunnicutt	United States	Action thriller
To Live and Die in L.A.	William Friedkin	William L. Petersen, Willem Dafoe, John Pankow	United States	Action thriller
Trancers	Charles Band	Tim Thomerson, Helen Hunt, Michael Stefani	United States	Science fiction action
Twinkle, Twinkle, Lucky Stars	Sammo Hung	Jackie Chan, Yuen Biao, Sammo Hung	Hong Kong	
A View to a Kill	John Glen	Roger Moore, Christopher Walken, Grace Jones, Tanya Roberts	United Kingdom	
Wild Geese II	Peter Hunt	Scott Glenn, Barbara Carrera, Edward Fox, Laurence Olivier	United Kingdom	
Year of the Dragon	Michael Cimino	Mickey Rourke, John Lone, Ariane	United States	Action thriller
Yes, Madam!	Corey Yuen	Michelle Yeoh, Cynthia Rothrock	Hong Kong	Martial arts film
1986
Aliens	James Cameron	Sigourney Weaver, Carrie Henn, Michael Biehn	United States	Science fiction action
Allan Quatermain and the Lost City of Gold	Gary Nelson	Richard Chamberlain, Sharon Stone, James Earl Jones	United States	
Armed Response	Fred Olen Ray	David Carradine, Lee Van Cleef, Mako	United States	
Armour of God	Jackie Chan	Jackie Chan, Alan Tam, Rosamund Kwan	Hong Kong	Martial arts film
Bagong Hari	Mario O'Hara	Dan Alvaro, Carmi Martin, Joel Torre, Robert Arevalo, Perla Bautista	Philippines	Action drama
Batang Quiapo	Pablo Santiago	Fernando Poe Jr., Maricel Soriano, Dencio Padilla	Philippines	Action comedy, romantic, musical
Behind Enemy Lines	Gideon Amir	David Carradine, Mako Iwamatsu, Steve James	United States	
A Better Tomorrow	John Woo	Chow Yun-fat, Leslie Cheung, Ti Lung	Hong Kong	Action thriller
Big Trouble in Little China	John Carpenter	Kurt Russell, Kim Cattrall	United States	
Bleu Comme L'Enfer	Yves Boisset	Lambert Wilson, Tchéky Karyo, Myriem Roussel	France	Action thriller
A Book of Heroes	Kevin Chu	Yasuaki Kurata, Yukari Oshima, Hu Kua, David Tao, Elsa Yang, Bin Bin	Taiwan; Hong Kong	Action comedy
Born American	Renny Harlin	Mike Norris, Steve Durham, David Coburn	Finland; United States	
Born to Defence	Jet Li	Jet Li, Dion Lam, Song Jia	Hong Kong	Martial arts film
Bukas Uulan ng Bala	Eddie Nicart	Dante Varona, Millicent Bautista, Liz Alindogan, Paquito Diaz, Roi Vinzon	Philippines	
Clash of the Ninjas	Wallace Chan	Thomas Allen, Eddie Chan, Bernie Junker	Hong Kong	
Cobra	George Pan Cosmatos	Sylvester Stallone, Brigitte Nielsen, Reni Santoni	United States	
The Delta Force	Menahem Golan	Chuck Norris, Lee Marvin	United States	
Diablo Force	William G. Mayo	Jess Lapid Jr., Bembol Roco, Rhey Roldan, Yusuf Salim, Robert Lee, Boy Fernandez	Philippines	
Eliminators	Peter Manoogian	Andrew Prine, Denise Crosby, Patrick Reynolds	United States	Science fiction action
F/X	Robert Mandel	Bryan Brown, Brian Dennehy, Diane Venora	United States	
Fair Game	Mario Andreacchio	Cassandra Delaney, Peter Ford, David Sandford	Australia	
Firewalker	J. Lee Thompson	Chuck Norris, Louis Gossett Jr., Melody Anderson	United States	
Gabi Na, Kumander	Pepe Marcos	Phillip Salvador, Dindo Fernando, Eddie Garcia	Philippines	
The Golden Child	Michael Ritchie	Eddie Murphy, Charles Dance, Charlotte Lewis	United States	
Heroes Shed No Tears	John Woo	Yuet Sang Chin, Doo Hee Jang, Ho Kon Kim	Hong Kong	
Highlander	Russell Mulcahy	Christopher Lambert, Sean Connery, Clancy Brown	United States, United Kingdom	
Iron Eagle	Sidney J. Furie	Louis Gossett Jr., Jason Gedrick, David Suchet	United States	
Isusumpa Mo Ang Araw Nang Isilang Ka	Nilo Saez	Ramon "Bong" Revilla Jr., Efren Reyes Jr., Susan Bautista	Philippines	
Jumpin' Jack Flash	Penny Marshall	Whoopi Goldberg, Stephen Collins, Jonathan Pryce	United States	Action comedy
Legacy of Rage	Ronny Yu	Brandon Lee, Michael Wong, Regina Kent	Hong Kong	
Martial Arts of Shaolin	Lau Kar-leung	Jet Li, Yu Chenghui, Ji Chunhua, Hung Yan-yan	Hong Kong; China	Martial arts film
Maximum Overdrive	Stephen King	Emilio Estevez, Pat Hingle, Laura Harrington	United States	Science fiction action
M.D. Geist	Hayato Ikeda	Norio Wakamoto, Rika Matsumoto, Akio Nojima	Japan	Animated film
Millionaire's Express	Sammo Hung	Sammo Hung, Yuen Biao, Cynthia Rothrock	Hong Kong	
Murphy's Law	J. Lee Thompson	Charles Bronson, Kathleen Wilhoite, Carrie Snodgress	United States	Action thriller
Muslim .357	Ronwaldo Reyes	Fernando Poe Jr., Vivian Foz, Eddie Garcia	Philippines	
No Retreat, No Surrender	Corey Yuen	Jean-Claude Van Damme, Kurt McKinney, J.W. Fails	United States; Hong Kong	
Raw Deal	John Irvin	Arnold Schwarzenegger, Kathryn Harrold, Sam Wanamaker	United States	
Righting Wrongs	Corey Yuen	Cynthia Rothrock, Yuen Biao	Hong Kong	
Royal Warriors	David Chung	Michelle Yeoh, Michael Wong (actor), Hiroyuki Sanada	Hong Kong	
Running Scared	Peter Hyams	Gregory Hines, Billy Crystal, Joe Pantoliano	United States	
Sa Bawat Hahakbangan Babaha ng Dugo	Leonardo L. Garcia	Lito Lapid, Myra Manibog, Dante Rivero, Paquito Diaz, Dick Israel	Philippines	
The Seventh Curse	Lam Ngai Kai	Chow Yun-Fat, Chin Sju-ho, Dick Wei	Hong Kong	Martial arts film
Vendetta dal futuro	Sergio Martino	Daniel Greene, Janet Agren, John Saxon	Italy	Science fiction action
The Wraith	Mike Marvin	Charlie Sheen, Nick Cassavetes, Randy Quaid	United States	
1987
American Ninja 2: The Confrontation	Sam Firstenberg	Michael Dudikoff, Steve James, Jeff Weston	United States	Martial arts film
Angel	Raymond Leung, Teresa Woo	Moon Lee, Yukari Oshima, Elaine Lui	Hong Kong	
Balandra Crossing	Enrique "Tintoy" Arcega	Chiquito, Redford White, Melissa Mendez	Philippines	Action comedy
Banzai Runner	John G. Thomas	Dean Stockwell, John Shepherd, Charles Dierkop	United States	
A Better Tomorrow II	John Woo	Chow Yun-fat, Emily Chu, Waise Lee	Hong Kong	
Beverly Hills Cop II	Tony Scott	Eddie Murphy, Judge Reinhold, Jürgen Prochnow	United States	Action comedy
Black Cobra	Stelvio Massi	Fred Williamson, Eva Grimaldi, Bruno Bilotta	Italy	Action thriller
Cherry 2000	Steve De Jarnatt	Melanie Griffith, David Andrews, Ben Johnson	United States	
A Chinese Ghost Story	Ching Siu-Ting	Leslie Cheung, Joey Wong, Wu Ma	Hong Kong	Martial arts film
Death Before Dishonor	Terry J. Leonard	Fred Dryer, Brian Keith, Paul Winfield	United States	
Death Wish 4: The Crackdown	J. Lee Thompson	Charles Bronson, Kay Lenz, John Ryan	United States	Action thriller
Eastern Condors	Sammo Hung	Sammo Hung, Yuen Biao, Joyce Godenzi	Hong Kong	
Extreme Prejudice	Walter Hill	Nick Nolte, Powers Boothe, Michael Ironside	United States	Action thriller
Fatal Beauty	Tom Holland	Whoopi Goldberg, Sam Elliott, Rubén Blades	United States	Action thriller
Forward March	Luciano B. Carlos	Tito, Vic and Joey, Richard Gomez, Snooky Serna	Philippines	Action comedy
Hard Ticket to Hawaii	Andy Sidaris	Ronn Moss, Dona Speir, Hope-Marie Carlton	United States	Action thriller
Humanda Ka Ikaw Ang Susunod!	Nilo Saez	Rudy Fernandez, Beth Bautista, Al Tantay	Philippines	
Kapag Puno Na Ang Salop	Arturo San Agustin	Fernando Poe Jr., Rowena Moran, Eddie Garcia, Paquito Diaz, Dencio Padilla	Philippines	
Le Solitaire	Jacques Deray	Jean-Paul Belmondo, Jean-Pierre Malo, Michel Creton	France	
Lethal Weapon	Richard Donner	Mel Gibson, Danny Glover, Gary Busey	United States	Action thriller
The Living Daylights	John Glen	Timothy Dalton, Maryam d'Abo, Jeroen Krabbé	United Kingdom	
Magnificent Warriors	David Chung	Richard Ng, Michelle Yeoh, Derek Yee	Hong Kong	
Masters of the Universe	Gary Goddard	Dolph Lundgren, Frank Langella, Meg Foster	United States	
Miami Connection	Richard Park, Y.K. Kim	Y.K. Kim, Vincent Hirsch, William Ergle	United States	Martial arts film
No Retreat, No Surrender 2	Corey Yuen	Loren Avedon, Matthias Hues, Cynthia Rothrock	Hong Kong; United States	
Predator	John McTiernan	Arnold Schwarzenegger, Carl Weathers, Elpidia Carrillo	United States	Science fiction action
Prison on Fire	Ringo Lam	Chow Yun-fat, Tony Leung Kar-Fai, Roy Cheung	China; Hong Kong	Action thriller
Project A II	Jackie Chan	Jackie Chan, Maggie Cheung, Rosamund Kwan	Hong Kong	Action comedy, martial arts
Rage of Honor	Gordon Hessler	Sho Kosugi, Lewis Van Bergen, Ulises Dumont	United States; Argentina	Martial arts film
RoboCop	Paul Verhoeven	Peter Weller, Nancy Allen, Ronny Cox	United States	Science fiction action
Rolling Vengeance	Steven Hillard Stern	Don Michael Paul, Lawrence Dane, Ned Beatty	Canada	Action thriller
The Running Man	Paul Michael Glaser	Arnold Schwarzenegger, María Conchita Alonso, Richard Dawson	United States	Science fiction action
Strike Commando	Bruno Mattei	Reb Brown, Christopher Connelly, Loes Kamma	Italy	
Superman IV: The Quest for Peace	Sidney J. Furie	Christopher Reeve, Gene Hackman, Jackie Cooper	United States	Superhero film
Surf Nazis Must Die	Peter George	Barry Brenner, Gail Neely, Michael Sonya	United States	
Target: Sparrow Unit	Ben Yalung	Ramon "Bong" Revilla Jr., Ronnie Ricketts, Sonny Parsons	Philippines	
Thou Shalt Not Kill... Except	Josh Becker	Brian Schulz, John Manfredi, Robert Rickman	United States	Action thriller
Tragic Hero	Taylor Wong	Andy Lau, Chow Yun-fat, Alex Man	Hong Kong	
Ultimatum: Ceasefire!	Wilfredo Milan, Bert Mendoza, Jerry Tirazona	Eddie Garcia, Ramon Revilla	Philippines	
Walker	Alex Cox	Ed Harris, Marlee Matlin, Peter Boyle	United States; Nicaragua	
Wanted: Dead or Alive	Gary Sherman	Rutger Hauer, Gene Simmons, Robert Guillaume	United States	
Wicked City	Yoshiaki Kawajiri	Yūsaku Yara, Toshiko Fujita, Ichirō Nagai	Japan	Animated film
1988
Above the Law	Andrew Davis	Steven Seagal, Pam Grier, Sharon Stone	United States	Action thriller
Action Jackson	Craig R. Baxley	Carl Weathers, Vanity, Craig T. Nelson	United States	
Afuang: Bounty Hunter	Mike Relon Makiling	Phillip Salvador, Eddie Garcia, Marianne Dela Riva	Philippines	
Agila ng Maynila	Pablo Santiago	Fernando Poe Jr., Vic Vargas, RR Herrera	Philippines	
Akyat Bahay Gang	Efren C. Piñon	Lito Lapid, Angela Perez, Jean Saburit	Philippines	
Alega Gang: Public Enemy No.1 of Cebu	Pepe Marcos	Ramon "Bong" Revilla Jr., Robin Padilla, Princess Punzalan	Philippines	Action crime
Alien Nation	Graham Baker	James Caan, Mandy Patinkin, Terence Stamp	United States	
Alyas Pusa: Ang Taong May 13 Buhay	Pablo Santiago	Ramon Revilla, Alona Alegre, Angela Perez	Philippines	
Ambush	Francis 'Jun' Posadas	Ronnie Ricketts, Dick Israel, Sonny Parsons	Philippines	
Anak ng Cabron	Willy Milan	Ace Vergel, Vivian Foz, Juan Rodrigo	Philippines	
Angel II	Teresa Woo	Alex Fong, Moon Lee, Elaine Lui	Hong Kong	
Ang Anino ni Asedillo	Bert Mendoza; Jose M. Dagumboy	Conrad Poe, Dante Rivero, George Estregan	Philippines	Period action
Black Eagle	Eric Karson	Jean-Claude Van Damme, Doran Clark, Bruce French	United States	Action thriller, martial arts film
Bloodsport	Newt Arnold	Jean-Claude Van Damme, Donald Gibb, Leah Ayres	United States	Martial arts film
Bobo Cop	Tony Y. Reyes	Joey Marquez, Alice Dixson, Matet de Leon	Philippines	Action comedy
Boy Negro	Pepe Marcos	Phillip Salvador, Dang Cecilio, Leopoldo Salcedo	Philippines	Action drama
Braddock: Missing in Action III	Aaron Norris	Chuck Norris, Aki Aleong, Roland Harrah III	United States	
Bruno	Jun Raquiza	Max Laurel, Ken Snell, Jane Castellvi	Philippines	
Bulletproof	Steve Carver	Gary Busey, Darlanne Fluegel, Henry Silva	United States	
Chinatown: Sa Kuko ng Dragon	Pepe Marcos	Ramon "Bong" Revilla Jr., Tony Ferrer, Eddie Garcia	Philippines	
Code Name: Black & White	Gayjee Pangan	Chiquito, Redford White, Pinky Marquez	Philippines	Action comedy
Crocodile Dundee II	John Cornell	Paul Hogan, Linda Kozlowski, John Meillon	Australia; United States	
The Dead Pool	Buddy Van Horn	Clint Eastwood, Patricia Clarkson, Evan Kim	United States	Action thriller
Die Hard	John McTiernan	Bruce Willis, Alan Rickman, Bonnie Bedelia	United States	Action thriller
Dongalo Massacre	Nilo Saez	Ramon 'Bong' Revilla Jr., Vic Vargas, Michael de Mesa	Philippines	
Dragons Forever	Sammo Hung	Jackie Chan, Sammo Hung, Yuen Biao	China; Hong Kong	
Dugo ng Pusakal	Manuel 'Fyke' Cinco	Anthony Alonzo, Eddie Rodriguez, Jean Saburit	Philippines	Action drama
Ex-Army	Tony Reyes	Lito Lapid, Marianne Dela Riva, Tetchie Agbayani	Philippines	
Gawa Na ang Bala Na Papatay sa Iyo	Willy Milan	Fernando Poe Jr., Marianne dela Riva, Vic Vargas	Philippines	Action thriller
Hero and the Terror	William Tannen	Chuck Norris, Brynn Thayer, Steve James	United States	
I'm Gonna Git You Sucka	Keenan Ivory Wayans	Keenan Ivory Wayans, Bernie Casey, Antonio Fargas	United States	Action comedy
Iyo ang Batas, Akin ang Katarungan	Leonardo L. Garcia	Ramon 'Bong' Revilla Jr., Eddie Garcia	Philippines	
The Inspector Wears Skirts	Wellson Chin Sing-Wai	Sibelle Hu, Ellen Chan, Sandra Ng	Hong Kong	Action comedy
In the Line of Duty III	Arthur Wong	Cynthia Khan, Hiroshi Fujioka, Dick Wei	Hong Kong	
Joaquin Burdado	Carlo J. Caparas	Ramon Revilla, Tanya Gomez, Janice Jurado	Philippines	Fantasy action
Kumakasa Kahit Nag-iisa	Nilo Saez	Ronnie Ricketts, Nadia Montenegro, Robin Padilla	Philippines	Action thriller
Kumander Anting-Anting	Charlie Ordoñez	Redford White, Melissa Mendez, Boy Alano	Philippines	Fantasy action comedy
Kumander Dante	Ben Yalung	Phillip Salvador, Laarnie Enriquez, Paquito Diaz	Philippines	Biographical action
Lost Command	Ben Yalung	Ramon "Bong" Revilla Jr., Jean Garcia, Paquito Diaz, George Estregan Jr.	Philippines	
Maniac Cop	William Lustig	Tom Atkins, Bruce Campbell, Laurene Landon	United States	
Messenger of Death	J. Lee Thompson	Charles Bronson, Trish VanDevere, Laurence Luckinbill	United States	Action thriller
Midnight Run	Martin Brest	Robert De Niro, Charles Grodin, Yaphet Kotto	United States	Action comedy
Ne réveillez pas un flic qui dort	José Pinheiro	Alain Delon, Michel Serrault, Patrick Catalifo	France	Action thriller
Patrolman	Cesar SB. Abella	Baldo Marro, Melissa Mendez, Sunshine	Philippines	
Patron	Joe Balagtas	Dante Varona, Lola Rodriguez, Marites Samson, Paquito Diaz, Joko Diaz	Philippines	
Pepeng Kuryente: Man with a Thousand Volts	Jose Yandóc	Ramon Revilla, Ramon "Bong" Revilla Jr., Dante Rivero	Philippines	Science fiction action
Platoon Leader	Aaron Norris	Michael Dudikoff, Michael DeLorenzo, Robert F. Lyons	United States	War action
Police Story 2	Jackie Chan	Jackie Chan, Maggie Cheung	Hong Kong	Martial arts film
Raider Platoon	Francis "Jhun" Posadas	Jess Lapid Jr., Philip Gamboa, Amanda Amores, Lezette Cordero, Ernie Ortega	Philippines	
Rambo III	Peter MacDonald	Sylvester Stallone, Richard Crenna, Marc de Jonge	United States	Action thriller
Red Heat	Walter Hill	Arnold Schwarzenegger, James Belushi, Peter Boyle	United States	Action thriller
Red Scorpion	Joseph Zito	Dolph Lundgren, M. Emmet Walsh, Al White	United States	
Sa Dulo ng Baril	Jerry O. Tirazona	Jess Lapid Jr., Lito Lazaro, Eric Borbon	Philippines	Historical action drama
Sandakot Na Bala	Jose N. Carreon	Rudy Fernandez, Gloria Romero, Eddie Garcia	Philippines	Action drama
Sgt. Ernesto 'Boy' Ybañez: Tirtir Gang	Willy Milan	Sonny Parsons, Eddie Garcia, Vivian Foz	Philippines	
Shakedown	James Glickenhaus	Peter Weller, Sam Elliott, Patricia Charbonneau	United States	
Shoot to Kill	Roger Spottiswoode	Sidney Poitier, Tom Berenger, Kirstie Alley	United States	Action thriller
Shoot to Kill: Boy Bicol ng Angeles	Jerry O. Tirazona; Johnny P. Capistrano	Sonny Parsons, Aurora Sevilla, Paquito Diaz	Philippines	
Smith & Wesson	Tony Y. Reyes	Vic Sotto, Joey de Leon, Beverly Vergel	Philippines	Action comedy
Space Mutiny	David Winters, Neal Sundstrom	Reb Brown, Cameron Mitchell	South Africa	Science fiction action
Striker	Stephen M. Andrews, Enzo G. Castellari	Frank Zagarino, John Phillip Law, John Steiner	United States; Italy	
Ang Supremo	Joey del Rosario	Ramon Revilla, Chat Silayan, Eddie Garcia	Philippines	
Target... Maganto	Leonardo L. Garcia	Ronnie Ricketts, Charlie Davao, Monica Herrera	Philippines	
They Live	John Carpenter	Roddy Piper, Keith David, Meg Foster	United States	Science fiction action
Tiger Cage	Yuen Woo-ping	Simon Yam, Carol Cheng, Jacky Cheung, Donnie Yen	Hong Kong	
Tiger on Beat	Lau Kar-Leung	Chow Yun-fat, Conan Lee, Nina Li	Hong Kong	
Traxx	Jerome Gary	Shadoe Stevens, Priscilla Barnes, Willard E. Pugh	United States	Action comedy
Trident Force	Richard Smith	Anthony Alonzo, Nanna Anderson, Mark Gil	Philippines	
Tubusin Mo ng Dugo	Pepe Marcos	Rudy Fernandez, Eddie Garcia, Marianne Dela Riva	Philippines	
Underground Guerillas	Jerry O. Tirazona	Dan Alvaro, Marithes Samson, Nick Romano, Danny Riel	Philippines	
The Untouchable Family	Tony Y. Reyes	Redford White, Edgar Mortiz	Philippines	Action comedy
Urban Terrorist	Dante Javier	Mark Gil, Ronnie Ricketts, Dick Israel	Philippines	
Young Guns	Christopher Cain	Emilio Estevez, Kiefer Sutherland, Lou Diamond Phillips	United States	
1989
Ako ang Huhusga (Kapag Puno Na Ang Salop 2)	Ronwaldo Reyes	Fernando Poe Jr., Eddie Garcia, Monica Herrera	Philippines	
Alex Boncayao Brigade	Joey del Rosario	Ronnie Ricketts, Mia Prats	Philippines	
American Ninja 3: Blood Hunt	Cedric Sundstrom	David Bradley, Steve James, Marjoe Gortner	United States	
American Rampage	David DeCoteau	Samantha York	United States	
Angel III	Stanley Tong	Alex Fong, Moon Lee	Hong Kong	
Angel Enforcers	Godfrey Ho	Dick Wei, Phillip Ko, Pan Pan Yeung	Hong Kong	
Arrest: Pat. Rizal Alih – Zamboanga Massacre	Carlo J. Caparas	Ramon Revilla, Vilma Santos, Eddie Garcia	Philippines	Action thriller
Babayaran Mo ng Dugo	Francis 'Jun' Posadas	Jestoni Alarcon, Rita Avila, John Regala	Philippines	
Batman	Tim Burton	Michael Keaton, Jack Nicholson, Kim Basinger	United States	
Best of the Best	Bob Radler	Eric Roberts, James Earl Jones, Sally Kirkland	United States	
A Better Tomorrow 3	Tsui Hark	Chow Yun-fat, Anita Mui, Tony Leung Kar-Fai	Hong Kong	
Black Rain	Ridley Scott	Michael Douglas, Andy García, Ken Takakura	United States	
Black Sheep Baby	Leonardo Garcia	Ronnie Ricketts, Monica Herrera, Tony Ferrer	Philippines	Action thriller
Blind Fury	Phillip Noyce	Rutger Hauer, Terrance O'Quinn, Lisa Blount	United States	Martial arts film
The Blond Fury	Hoi Mang	Cynthia Rothrock, Ronny Yu, Wu Ma	United States; Hong Kong	
Bloodfist	Terence H. Winkless	Don "The Dragon" Wilson, Joe Mari Avellana, Michael Shaner	United States	
Carnap King? (The Randy Padilla Story)	Deo J. Fajardo	Robin Padilla, Maita Soriano, Jobelle Salvador	Philippines	Biographical action
Comando de la Muerte	Alfredo Gurrola	Sergio Goyri, Jorge Luke, Cesar Sobrevals	Mexico	
Cyborg	Albert Pyun	Jean-Claude Van Damme, Deborah Richter, Vincent Klyn	United States	Science fiction action, martial arts film
Dead Bang	John Frankenheimer	Don Johnson, Penelope Ann Miller, William Forsythe	United States	
Delima Gang	Pepe Marcos	Phillip Salvador, Marianne Dela Riva, Robin Padilla	Philippines	Biographical action
Devil Hunters	Chun-Ku Lu	Alex Man, Moon Lee, Siu-Ming Lau	Hong Kong	
Dragon Fight	Billy Tang	Jet Li, Stephen Chow, Dick Wei	Hong Kong	
Eagle Squad	Jose Carreon	Robin Padilla, Monsour del Rosario, E.R. Ejercito	Philippines	
Fatal Vacation	Eric Tsang	Bernardo Bernardo, Emily Kwan, Spanky Manikan	Hong Kong	
Future Force	David A. Prior	David Carradine, Anna Rapagna, Robert Tessier	United States	Science fiction action
Ghostbusters II	Ivan Reitman	Bill Murray, Dan Aykroyd, Sigourney Weaver	United States	Action comedy
God of Gamblers	Wong Jing	Chow Yun-fat, Andy Lau, Joey Wong	Hong Kong	
Hindi Pahuhuli nang Buhay	Joey del Rosario	Robin Padilla, Dawn Zulueta, Johnny Delgado	Philippines	
In the Line of Duty 4	Yuen Woo-ping	Donnie Yen, Cynthia Khan, Michael Wong	Hong Kong	
Indiana Jones and the Last Crusade	Steven Spielberg	Harrison Ford, Sean Connery, Denholm Elliott	United States	Action adventure
Ipaglalaban Ko!	Manuel 'Fyke' Cinco	Rudy Fernandez, Charito Solis, Gretchen Barretto	Philippines	
Irosin: Pagputok ng Araw, Babaha ng Dugo	Augusto Buenaventura	Anthony Alonzo, Aga Muhlach, Ricky Davao	Philippines	Action thriller
Isang Bala, Isang Buhay	Jose N. Carreon	Ramon "Bong" Revilla Jr., Tony Ferrer, Dawn Zulueta,	Philippines	
Joe Pring: Homicide Manila Police	Augusto Salvador	Phillip Salvador, Aurora Sevilla, Maila Gumila,	Philippines	
Jones Bridge Massacre (Task Force Clabio)	Ben Yalung	Lito Lapid, Jackie Aquino, Eddie Garcia	Philippines	Crime action
K-9	Rod Daniel	James Belushi, Mel Harris, Kevin Tighe	United States	
Kickboxer	Mark di Salle, David Worth	Jean-Claude Van Damme, Dennis Alexio, Dennis Chan	United States	
The Killer	John Woo	Chow Yun-fat, Danny Lee, Sally Yeh	Hong Kong	
Killer Angels	Chun-Ku Lu	Moon Lee	Hong Kong	
Kinjite: Forbidden Subjects	J. Lee Thompson	Charles Bronson, Perry Lopez, James Pax	United States	
Lethal Weapon 2	Richard Donner	Mel Gibson, Danny Glover, Joe Pesci	United States	
Licence to Kill	John Glen	Timothy Dalton, Carey Lowell, Robert Davi	United Kingdom	
Next of Kin	John Irvin	Patrick Swayze, Liam Neeson, Adam Baldwin	United States	
Pink Cadillac	Buddy Van Horn	Clint Eastwood, Bernadette Peters, Timothy Carhart	United States	
Princess Madam	Godfrey Ho	Moon Lee, Michiko Nishiwaki	Hong Kong	
Ang Pumatay nang Dahil Sa'yo!	Wilfredo Milan	Chuck Perez, Eddie Garcia, Vic Vargas,	Philippines	
A Punch to Revenge	Chiu Lee	Ben Lam, Yukari Oshima, Stanley Sui-Fan Fung	Hong Kong	
The Punisher	Mark Goldblatt	Dolph Lundgren, Louis Gossett Jr., Jeroen Krabbé	United States; Australia	
Renegades	Jack Sholder	Kiefer Sutherland, Lou Diamond Phillips, Robert Knepper	United States	Action thriller
Road House	Rowdy Herrington	Patrick Swayze, Kelly Lynch, Sam Elliott	United States	
Sa Kuko ng Agila	Augusto Buenaventura	Joseph Estrada, Nikki Coseteng, Maria Isabel Lopez	Philippines	
Sgt. Niñonuevo: The Fastest Gun Alive of WPD	Ronnie San Juan	Sonny Parsons, Marianne dela Riva, Eddie Garcia	Philippines	
Snake Eater	George Erschbamer	Lorenzo Lamas, Ronnie Hawkins	Canada	
Snake Eater II	George Erschbamer	Lorenzo Lamas, Ron Palillo, Kathleen Kinmont	Canada	
Tango & Cash	Andrei Konchalovsky	Sylvester Stallone, Kurt Russell, Teri Hatcher	United States	
Tatak ng Isang Api	Augusto Salvador	Ronnie Ricketts, Eddie Garcia, Efren Reyes Jr.	Philippines	
Violent Cop	Beat Takeshi Kitano	Beat Takeshi Kitano	Japan	Action thriller
Walang Panginoon	Mauro Gia Samonte	Jestoni Alarcon, Rita Avila, Aurora Sevilla	Philippines	
Wanted: Pamilya Banal	Pablo P. Santiago	Fernando Poe Jr., Charo Santos, Armida Siguion-Reyna	Philippines	Action drama

== See also ==
- Action films
- Martial arts films
- Swashbuckler films
