= Simon Broad =

New Zealand voice actor

Simon Broad (born February 10, 1963, in Pahiatua) is a New Zealand voice actor living in Hong Kong since July 12, 1981.

== Background ==
Broad started voice-over while working for Godfrey Ho. During the 1980s he was voicing up to 170 films in a year. By 1999 he estimated that he had voiced more than 700 films. They included, to that time, all Chow Yun-fat films and most of Jet Li's. He had also voiced a couple of Jackie Chan films and the rerelease of Bruce Lee's Way of the Dragon. In a South China Morning Post article Broad was described as Hong Kong's viceroy of the voice-over; the doyen of dubbers.

With a fall off in demand for movie-voice over Broad and fellow actor Jack Murphy through their company called Two Guys expanded into voices for animation, particularly Japanese cartoons and the voices for talking toys.

In 2008 he joined Sally Dellow of consultancy Dramatic Difference as a roleplayer and facilitator. Dramatic Difference provide coaching and theatre-led learning and development programmes aimed at the professional business sector. The relationship between Broad's company Bramp International Ltd and Dramatic Difference is unclear. Bramp are described as global team development trainers for companies such as HSBC. They use video conferencing for training and meetings.

== Credits ==
Year	Television	Part
2018-present	Chibi Maruko-chan	Tomozu Sakura
Year	Film	Part
2006	Ayakashi: Samurai Horror Tales	
2005	Dragon Blade	Sifu (voice)
1996	Dr. Wai in "The Scripture with No Words"	Chow Si Kit (voice, uncredited)
1993	Godzilla vs. Mechagodzilla II	Helicopter Pilot (voice, uncredited)
1993	Executioners	Inspector Lau (voice, uncredited)
1993	Iron Monkey	Governor Cheng Pak-Fong (voice, uncredited)
1993	Butterfly and Sword	Yip Cheung (voice, uncredited)
1992	Godzilla vs. Mothra	Kenji Andoh (voice, uncredited)
1992	Full Contact	Gou Fei (voice, uncredited)
1992	Hard-Boiled	Insp. 'Tequila' Yuen (voice, uncredited)
1991	Dragon Ball: The Magic Begins	Westwood (voice, uncredited)
1991	Story of Ricky	Riki-Oh Saiga / Assistant Warden Dan (English version, voice, uncredited)
1991	Once a Thief	Red Bean Pudding (Joe) (voice, uncredited)
1990	Island of Fire	Fatty Liu Hsi Chia / John Liu (voice, uncredited)
1989	Devil Hunters	Han San (voice, uncredited)
1989	Godzilla vs. Biollante	Seizo Okouchi / Saradia Plant Director (voice, uncredited)
1989	God of Gamblers	Ko Chun / 'The God of Gamblers' (voice, uncredited)
1989	In the Line of Duty 4	Officer Michael Wong (voice, uncredited)
1989	The Killer	Ah Jong (voice, uncredited)
1988	The Inspector Wears Skirts	Inspector Kan (voice, uncredited)
1987	A Better Tomorrow II	Mark Lee (voice, uncredited)
1987	Transformers: The Headmasters	Blaster, Twincast, Fortress Maximus, Highbrow, Hound, Scattershot, Scourge, Sixshot, Skydive, Slag, Blurr, Weirdwolf
1986	Magic Crystal	Lau Ta (voice, uncredited)
1985	Police Story	Cheung, the Lawyer (voice, uncredited)
1985	Heart of Dragon	Yan / Ian (voice, uncredited)
1985	Twinkle Twinkle Lucky Stars	Ricky Fung (voice, uncredited)
1984	The Super Dimension Fortress Macross: Do You Remember Love?	Bruno J. Global / Lynn Kaihun / Hayao Kakizaki (voice, uncredited)

Broad was also the ADR supervisor on Dragonblade.
