= Moon Lee (Hong Kong actress) =

Hong Kong actor and stuntwoman

- Chinese: 李賽鳳
- Born: Moon Lee Choi-Fung; 14 February 1965 (age 61); British Hong Kong
- Occupations: Actress; martial artist; stuntwoman
- Years active: 1980–1999
- Children: 1
- Website: Moon Lee's Sina blog site

Moon Lee Choi-Fung (李賽鳳; born 14 February 1965) is a former Hong Kong actress, martial artist and stuntwoman who frequently played roles related to the Hong Kong action and martial arts genres in films and TV serials. She was particularly notable in the sub-genre known as girls with guns, with her starring role in Angel (1987) making her one of the biggest female martial arts stars in Hong Kong.

== Biography ==
From age 6 to 12, Lee lived in Kaohsiung, Taiwan with her father, who had business there. She attended Youchang Elementary School. During her stay in Taiwan, she learned Mandarin Chinese and developed her piano and dancing expertise. As a result, she often had performances.

When Lee first returned to Hong Kong to attend middle school, her Cantonese was not perfect. At age 15, Lee was accidentally discovered by a television director, Siu Hin-fai, during a school dancing performance. She was recommended to play a role in a television series Fatherland. Since the series did not require too much of her time and she could still study at school, her parents agreed to let her act. In the series, she was a country girl by the name of A Mun, who looked just like Lee. Ever since then, people liked to call her A Mun. Her performance in the series was so impressive that she began her career as an actress. Since she has been practicing dances from her childhood, it was easy for her to perform action movies with her agile and flexible movements. After her first martial arts movie in ancient costumes (Zu Warriors from the Magic Mountain), she has not left the stage of action movies.

At 18, after graduating from high school, Lee signed contracts with both Asia Television and Golden Harvest. When she was sent to Japan to make an advertisement for Mitsubishi, the company asked her to pick an English name, and she chose "Moon" as the pronunciation of Mun in Cantonese is close to the English word, Moon.

She played in many television series, exceeding 400 episodes. Subsequently, she focused her efforts wholly on movies, mostly action movies. In the late 1990s, she gradually left the movie field and was passionately involved in the promotion of the art of dance and established a dancing school to cultivate talented dancers. Her students won excellence awards in Hong Kong dance competitions.

== Stunt accident ==
While performing the final stunt in Devil Hunters (1989), Lee sustained a third degree burn. Lee was supposed to jump off a window from a second story building to evade an explosion. Due to bad timing by the pyrotechnicians, she was engulfed in flames before she jumped down, resulting in severe burns to her hands and face. The epilogue of the film accounts the details about the accident, along with a message of commendation from the director for her courage and hardwork.

== Filmography ==
=== Films ===
- To Sir with Troubles 交叉零蛋 (1981)
- Winners and Sinners a.k.a. 5 Lucky Stars 奇謀妙計五福星 (1983)
- The Champions a.k.a. Crazy to Win 波牛 (1983)
- Zu: Warriors from the Magic Mountain 新蜀山劍俠 (1983)
- The Protector 威龍猛探 (1985)
- Mr. Vampire 僵屍先生 (1985)
- Twinkle Twinkle Lucky Stars (1986) (cameo)
- Mr. Vampire 2 僵屍先生續集 (1986)
- The Story of Dr. Sun Yat Sen (1986)
- Angel a.k.a. Fighting Madam a.k.a. Iron Angels a.k.a. Midnight Angels 天使行動 (1987)
- Angel II a.k.a. Fighting Madam 2 a.k.a. Iron Angels 2 a.k.a. Hong Kong Police Madame 2 天使行動2之火鳳狂龍 (1988)
- Midnight Whispers a.k.a. Cascading Feeling 盡訴心中情 (1988) (production date 1986)
- Angel Enforcers 皇家飛鳳 (1989)
- Devil Hunters 獵魔群英 (1989)
- Angel III a.k.a. Iron Angels 3 a.k.a. Return of Iron Angels 天使行動3魔女末日 (1989)
- Killer Angels 殺手天使 (1989)
- Princess Madam a.k.a. Under Police Protection 金牌師姐 (1989)
- Demon Intruder a.k.a. Nocturnal Demon 夜魔先生/野鬼先生 (1990)
- Fatal Termination a.k.a. Death Blow 赤色大風暴 (1990)
- New Kids in Town a.k.a. Master of Disaster a.k.a. New Killers in Town 初到貴境 (1990)
- The Revenge of Angel 水玲瓏 (1990)
- Bury Me High 衞斯理之霸王卸甲 (1991)
- Angel Force 天使特警 (1991)
- Dreaming the Reality 夢醒血未停 (1991)
- Mission of Condor a.k.a. Mission Kill a.k.a. Angel Force 禿鷹檔案/禿鷹行動 (1991)
- Angel Terminators 2 a.k.a. The Best of the Lady Kickboxer 火種 (1991)
- The Big Deal 神偷家族 (1992)
- Inspector Wears Skirts 4 霸王花:重出江湖 (1992)
- Kickboxer's Tears 新龍爭虎鬥 (1992)
- Enter the Lady Kickboxer (1992)
- A Serious Shock! a.k.a. Yes, Madam! '92 a.k.a. Death Triangle 末路狂花 (1992)
- Beauty Investigator a.k.a. Beauty Inspectors 妙探雙嬌 (1992)
- Mission of Justice 金三角群英會 (1992)
- The Avenging Quartet 霸海紅英 (1993)
- Angel of Kickboxer a.k.a. Angel the Kickboxer a.k.a. Bloody Mary Killer a.k.a. Honor and Glory 縱橫天下 (1993) (uncredited)
- Angel's Project a.k.a. Angel Mission 天使狂龍 (1993)
- Secret Police 警網雄風 (1994)
- Little Heroes Lost in China 小鬼奇兵 (1997)

=== TV serial dramas ===
- Fatherland 大地恩情 (1980)
- I Have to Fly 我要高飛 (1981)
- Ah Sir Ah Sir 阿SIR 阿SIR (1982)
- Onion Flower 洋葱花 (1983)
- Drunken Fist 醉拳王無忌 (1984)
- I Love Mermaid 我愛美人魚 (1984)
- Drunken Fist 2 日帝月后 (1984)
- Miracle of the Orient 香江歳月 (1984)
- Ji Gong 濟公 (1985)
- Passionate Fairy 仙女多情 (1985)
- Bravo! Kowloon Tong 魅力九龍塘 (1985)
- The Supersword Lady 越女剣 (1986)
- Ba Wang Hua 霸王花 (1993)
- Fist of Power 南拳北腿 (1995)
- Putonghua Children Drama 普通話親子劇場 (1998)
- Fist of Hero 中華大丈夫 (1999)
