= Angel (1987 film) =

1987 Hong Kong action film

- Hong Kong magazine ad
- Directed by: Raymond Leung; Tony Leung; Ivan Lai; Teresa Woo
- Written by: Teresa Woo
- Produced by: Teresa Woo
- Starring: Moon Lee; Yukari Oshima; Elaine Lui; Hideki Saijo; Alex Fong; Hwang Jang Lee
- Cinematography: Sander Lee Kar-ko
- Music by: Richard Lo Sai-kit
- Production company: Molesworth Limited
- Release date: October 3, 1987 (Hong Kong)
- Running time: 93 minutes
- Country: Hong Kong
- Languages: Cantonese; Japanese; Thai

Angel (Chinese: 天使行動; Jyutping: Tin1 si3 hang4 dung6, transl. "Angel Operation") (Note: Also known as Fighting Madam, Iron Angels, and Midnite Angel,) is a 1987 Hong Kong action film inspired by Charlie's Angels which stars Moon Lee and Yukari Oshima. The film is noted for launching the careers of both Lee and Oshima. Angel has also been credited with establishing the girls with guns action film subgenre along with Yes, Madam (1985). The film was followed by two sequels: Angel II (1988) and Angel III (1989).

== Plot ==
After Interpol destroys a mass of Thai opium fields, the drug lords strike back by viciously murdering the officers in charge of the drug raid. In response, the cops hire the mercenary Angel Organization whose leader, John (David Chiang), sends crack agents—Angel #01 Saijo (Hideki Saijo), Moon (Moon Lee) and Elaine (Elaine Lui). Their first act is to seize a massive drug shipment with the help of an American secret operative, Commander Alex Fong (Alex Fong). This inevitably invokes the rage of frighteningly fierce Madam Yeung (Yukari Oshima) who recently grabbed the mantle of power after killing her predecessor. After a series of tussles with Madam Yeung, Saijo finds himself buried alive in an armored car while Moon and Elaine settle their score with their nemesis, kung fu style.

== Cast ==
- Yukari Oshima as Madam Yeung
- Moon Lee as Moon (Angel #2)
- Elaine Lui as Elaine (Angel #3)
- Hideki Saijo as Saijo
- Alex Fong as Alex (Angel #1)
- Hwang Jang-Lee as Chang Lung
- Chun Yang as drug lord
- David Chiang as John Keung
- Lam Chung as torture victim

== Production ==
According to action director Tony Leung Siu Hung, Teresa Woo only did the script, Ivan Lai was the director.

== Reception ==
The film has been considered "disappointing" in retrospective reviews due to fewer action sequences than in later entries in the genre. The Encyclopedia of Martial Arts Movies gave a rating of two and a half out of four and said the editing is "choppy" and there are too many gunfights but what little martial arts the film has was described as "great". The Hong Kong Filmography gave a rating of seven out of ten and wrote: "Angel is a superior girls-with-guns action fest that is almost stolen by its colorful villainess." Cinema magazine gave a rating of three out of five and said the film has weak action and the heroines lack charisma. Blu-ray.com reviewed the Blu-ray version by Vinegar Syndrome and gave it a positive review. They praised action scenes and the score but criticized the characterizations.

The book Reel Knockouts noted the film as an example of a trope when violent women appear as film villains, they are more violent than their male counterparts.

== Sequels ==
=== Angel II ===
Angel II (Chinese: 天使行動II火鳳狂龍; Jyutping: Tin1 si3 hang4 dung6 II fo2 fung6 kong4 lung4, transl. "Angel Operation II: Fire Phoenix Crazy Dragon"), also known as Angels (UK) and Iron Angels II, is the first sequel, released in 1988. Teresa Woo directed, wrote, and produced the film. Moon Lee, Elaine Lui, and Alex Fong returned as the Angel trio. The plot involves the trio traveling to Malaysia for a vacation and taking out a leader of a fascist army.

The Hong Kong Filmography gave a rating of six out of ten and wrote: "Not as exciting as its forerunner, and lacking as formidable an antagonist as Yukari Oshima, Angel II still possesses much of the original's appeal." Blu-ray.com said the film "gets a little bogged down in melodrama" but said the film improves in the final act.

=== Angel III ===
Angel III (Chinese: 天使行動III魔女末日; Jyutping: Tin1 si3 hang4 dung6 III mo1 neoi5-2 mut6 jat6, transl. "Angel Operation III: Last Days of an Evil Woman"), also known as Iron Angels III and Return of the Iron Angels, is the second sequel, released in 1989. Teresa Woo directed, wrote, and produced the film. Moon Lee and Alex Fong returned as the Angels. Elaine Lui did not return for this entry. The plot involves the Angels stopping a terrorist group in Thailand.

The Hong Kong Filmography gave a rating of five out of ten and said the film is not as good as its predecessors and called it "[...] just too foolish and slapdash for its own good." The film was noted for containing the best fight scene of the series: Moon Lee fighting guards in the terrorist fortress. Blu-ray.com called it a "very entertaining" film due to the action scenes but said the story is "half-baked". /Film said the film includes one of the best fight scenes of Lee's career.
