= Midnight Whispers (film) =

1986 Hong Kong film by David Lai and Michael Mak

- Film poster
- Directed by: David Lai; Michael Mak
- Written by: Johnny Mak; Stephen Shiu
- Produced by: Johnny Mak
- Starring: Moon Lee; Josephine Koo
- Cinematography: Chang Te-wei
- Edited by: Fan Kung-wing
- Music by: Joseph Chan
- Production company: Genesis Films Limited
- Distributed by: Golden Harvest
- Release date: 1 December 1988
- Running time: 96 minutes
- Country: Hong Kong
- Language: Cantonese

Midnight Whispers (Chinese: 盡訴心中情; Pinyin: Jin su xin zhong qing; Jyutping: Jun so sam jung ching; literally Cascading Feeling) is a 1986 Hong Kong melodramatic film starring Josephine Koo and Moon Lee. The film reportedly sat on the shelf for over a year before finally being released in 1988.

== Alternate versions ==
There are two versions of the film:

- In the original theatrical release and first video release available in Hong Kong during the late 1980s-early 1990s, there were scenes involving real life radio personality Pamela Peck who plays herself as the host of a popular late-night radio call-in program.
- In the DVD edition, any scenes with real life radio personality Pamela Peck present in the theatrical version were absent and replaced with an alternate cut.
