= Mr. Vampire II =

1986 Hong Kong film by Ricky Lau

- Original Hong Kong film poster

Chinese name
- Traditional Chinese: 殭屍家族
- Simplified Chinese: 僵尸家族
- Literal meaning: Vampire Family
Transcriptions
Standard Mandarin
- Hanyu Pinyin: Jiāngshī Jiāzú
Yue: Cantonese
- Jyutping: Goeng1 Si1 Gaa1 Zuk6
- Directed by: Ricky Lau
- Written by: Barry Wong
- Produced by: Sammo Hung
- Starring: Yuen Biao; Moon Lee; Lam Ching-ying; Billy Lau; Chung Fat; Pauline Wong Yuk-wan; Bowie Wu
- Cinematography: Arthur Wong
- Edited by: Peter Cheung
- Music by: Anders Nelsson; Alastair Monteith-Hodge
- Production companies: Bo Ho Films Co., Ltd. Paragon Films Ltd.
- Distributed by: Golden Harvest
- Release date: 15 August 1986
- Running time: 86 minutes
- Country: Hong Kong
- Language: Cantonese
- Box office: HK$17,072,137

Mr. Vampire II (Chinese: 殭屍家族; lit. 'Vampire Family'; also known as Mr. Vampire Part 2) is a 1986 Hong Kong comedy horror film directed by Ricky Lau, starring Yuen Biao, Moon Lee and Lam Ching-ying, and produced by Sammo Hung. It is the second film in the Mr. Vampire franchise, and the sequel to Mr. Vampire. Mr. Vampire and its sequels were released as part of the jiangshi cinematic boom in Hong Kong during the 1980s.

In the film, an archaeologist discovers a trio of immobilized jiangshi, and hopes to profit from his discovery. All three jiangshi are soon revived. A failed attempt to kill the two adult jiangshi results in their escape.

== Plot ==
Kwok, an archaeologist, brings his two students with him in search of ancient artifacts. They stumble upon a cave and discover three jiangshi (Chinese "hopping" vampires) — an adult male, an adult female, and a male child. The vampires are immobilized because they have Chinese talismans stuck to their foreheads. Kwok brings them back to his lab and decides to sell the boy vampire in the black market.

While transporting the boy vampire, Kwok accidentally strips the talisman off its forehead and breaks the charm. The creature awakens and escapes. It enters a house by chance and befriends a little girl, who mistakes the young vampire for an illegal immigrant boy. Meanwhile, back in the lab, one of Kwok's students mischievously removes the talismans from the adult vampires and revives them. The vampires start to "hop" around and attack people. It took the three men much trouble to put them back to rest temporarily.

One of Kwok's students was bitten by the male vampire while fighting it, so he goes to see Dr Lam for treatment. Lam recognises the bite marks and realises that there are vampires running loose in town. Together with his daughter Gigi and his prospective son-in-law Yen, Lam embarks on a quest to destroy the vampires.

Lam tells Yen and Gigi to secretly follow Kwok's student back to the lab and find the vampires. While Gigi goes to notify the police of their discovery, Yen accidentally removes the talismans on the vampires' foreheads and awaken them. Luckily, Lam and Gigi show up and help him. After a long fight, they put the vampires to sleep using sedatives from the lab. The police arrive right after and take the two vampires to the morgue in the police station.

Lam and Yen sneak into the morgue and try to kill the vampires with a wooden sword but fail. Kwok and his students also arrive at the morgue because his student needs to get the blood of one of the vampires to cure himself after being bitten. Lam and Yen pretend to be corpses while Kwok and his students carry the vampires out. They put the bodies in the back of a truck while Lam and Yen sneak into the driver seat and hijack the truck. Later, they are stopped by police officers at a roadblock and the two vampires escape. The boy vampire sees the two adult vampires escaping on the news and lets out a loud cry that alerts the vampires to his location.

Lam and Yen hear on their radio that there are vampire sightings and they arrive at the children's house. With the help of the police, Lam and Yen kill the two adult vampires and question the humaneness of their methods. However, upon seeing how fond the children have grown of the boy vampire, Yen decides to inject it with anesthetics instead of killing it. He disguises the vampire in normal clothing and sneaks it out of the house without the police noticing. Kwok arrives and falls face-first to the ground, revealing his two students behind him who have now become vampires after failing to procure a sample of vampire blood to cure themselves.

== Cast ==
- Lam Ching-ying as Dr Lam Ching-ying (林正英), a physician who is also skilled in Chinese supernatural arts
- Yuen Biao as Yen (夏友仁), a reporter and Lam's prospective son-in-law
- Moon Lee as Gigi, Lam's daughter
- Chung Fat as Professor Kwok Tun-wong (郭敦煌), the archaeologist who discovers the vampires
- Billy Lau as Chicken, Kwok's student
- Ka Lee as Sashimi, Kwok's student
- Pauline Wong as the female adult vampire
- Cheung Wing-cheung as the male adult vampire
- Hoh Kin-wai as the boy vampire
- Hon To-yue as Chia-chia, the girl who befriends the boy vampire
- Choi Man-gam as Chia-chia's brother
- Bowie Wu as Mr Hu, Chia-chia's father
- Wu Ma as Mr Hu's neighbour
- Lee Chi-git as Ping
- Hsiao Ho as a lab technician
- James Tien as a police officer
- Cho Tat-wah as the police chief
- Manfred Wong as a coroner
- Yuen Miu as a policeman
- Stanley Fung as an archaeologist
- Ban Yun-sang as a policeman at the traffic checkpoint
- Chow Gam-kong as a policeman
- Yiu Yau-hung as a fireman

== Home media ==
=== VHS ===
Release date	Country	Classification	Publisher	Format	Language	Subtitles	Notes	Ref.
19 June 1998	United States	Unknown	Tai Seng Video	NTSC	Cantonese	English		
24 January 2000	United Kingdom	15	Made in Hong Kong	PAL	Cantonese	English		

=== Laserdisc ===
Release date	Country	Classification	Publisher	Catalog no.	Format	Language	Subtitles	Notes	Ref.
Unknown	Japan	N/A	Pony Video		CLV / NTSC	Cantonese	Japanese	Audio mono	

=== VCD ===
Release date	Country	Classification	Publisher	Format	Language	Subtitles	Notes	Ref.
Unknown	Hong Kong	N/A	Megastar (HK)/ Media Asia	NTSC	Cantonese	English, Traditional Chinese	2VCDs	
5 December 2003	China	N/A	Guang Dong Yin Xiang Chu Ban She	NTSC	Mandarin	None	2VCDs	
21 September 2005	Taiwan	N/A	Guang Dong Yin Xiang Chu Ban She	NTSC	Mandarin	Traditional Chinese	2VCDs	
11 July 2008	Hong Kong	N/A	Joy Sales (HK)	NTSC	Cantonese, Mandarin	English, Traditional Chinese	2VCDs	

=== DVD ===
Release date	Country	Classification	Publisher	Format	Region	Language	Sound	Subtitles	Notes	Ref.
Unknown	Hong Kong	N/A	Megastar	NTSC	ALL	Cantonese, English	Dolby Digital 5.1	English, Simplified Chinese, Traditional Chinese, Japanese, Korean	Anamorphic widescreen transfer	
Unknown	Japan	N/A	Universal Pictures Japan	NTSC	2	Cantonese, Japanese	Dolby Digital mono	Japanese	Digitally re-mastered box-set	
3 August 2001	Hong Kong	N/A	Deltamac (HK)	NTSC	ALL	Cantonese, Mandarin	Dolby Digital 2.0	English, Traditional Chinese, Simplified Chinese		
5 December 2003	China	N/A	Guang Dong Yin Xiang Chu Ban She	NTSC	ALL	Mandarin	Unknown	English, Simplified Chinese		
19 February 2004	France	N/A	HK Video	PAL	2	Cantonese	Dolby Digital	French	Box-set	
4 July 2006	Taiwan	N/A	Catalyst Logic	NTSC	3	Cantonese, Mandarin	Dolby Digital 5.0	English, Traditional Chinese		
11 October 2009	Japan	N/A	Geneon Universal Entertainment	NTSC	2	Cantonese	Unknown	Japanese	Digitally Remastered Edition	
16 April 2009	Hong Kong	N/A	Joy Sales (HK)	NTSC	2	Cantonese, Mandarin	Dolby Digital 2.0	English, Traditional Chinese, Simplified Chinese		
21 December 2012	Japan	N/A	Paramount Home/ Entertainment Japan	NTSC	2	Cantonese, Japanese	Dolby Digital	Japanese	Digitally re-mastered	

=== Blu-ray ===
Release date	Country	Classification	Publisher	Format	Region	Language	Sound	Subtitles	Notes	Ref.
26 July 2011	Hong Kong	N/A	CMS Media Limited (HK)	NTSC	A	Cantonese, Mandarin	6.1, 7.1, Dolby TrueHD, Dolby Digital EX(TM) / THX Surround EX(TM)	English, Traditional Chinese		
21 December 2012	Japan	N/A	Paramount Home Entertainment Japan	NTSC	A	Cantonese, Japanese		Japanese	Digitally re-mastered	
