= The Protector (1985 film) =

1985 film by James Glickenhaus

- Hong Kong film poster

Chinese name
- Traditional Chinese: 威龍猛探
- Simplified Chinese: 威龙猛探
- Literal meaning: Dragon Detective
Transcriptions
Standard Mandarin
- Hanyu Pinyin: Wēi lóng měng tàn
Yue: Cantonese
- Jyutping: Wai^{1} lung^{4} maang^{5} taam^{3}
- Directed by: James Glickenhaus
- Written by: James Glickenhaus; HK version: Edward Tang King-sang
- Produced by: David Chan
- Starring: Jackie Chan; Danny Aiello; Roy Chiao; Moon Lee; Peter Yang; Bill Wallace
- Cinematography: Mark Irwin; HK version: Chang Yiu-tsou
- Edited by: Evan A. Lottman; HK version: Peter Cheung
- Music by: Ken Thorne
- Production company: Golden Harvest; Eurasia Investments
- Distributed by: Golden Harvest (HK); Warner Bros. Pictures (US)
- Release dates: July 11, 1985 (HK); August 23, 1985 (US)
- Running time: 95 minutes (US); 92 minutes (HK)
- Countries: United States; Hong Kong
- Languages: English; Cantonese (Note: Shot in English, later dubbed into Cantonese for the Hong Kong release.)
- Box office: US$11 million (est.)

The Protector (Chinese: 威龍猛探; lit. 'Dragon Detective') is a 1985 buddy cop action film written and directed by James Glickenhaus. It stars Jackie Chan and Danny Aiello, along with Roy Chiao, Peter Yang, Moon Lee, and Bill Wallace. An international co-production between the United States and Hong Kong, this was Chan's second attempt at breaking into the American film market, after 1980’s The Big Brawl, which had moderate box office success but was considered a disappointment.

Conflicts between Glickenhaus and Chan during production led to two official versions of the film: Glickenhaus' original version for American audiences and a Hong Kong version re-shot and re-edited by Jackie Chan. The original Glickenhaus version was a box office failure in North America, while Chan's edited version was a moderate success in Asia; the film was also moderately successful in Europe.

== Plot ==
=== U.S. version ===
Billy Wong is a Hong Kong-born officer with the New York Police Department. During a bar robbery gone awry, Billy kills the perpetrators but loses his partner Michael Alexander, drawing the ire of his superiors. Later, in the middle of a fashion show, masked gangsters storm in and kidnap Laura Shapiro, the daughter of known gangster Martin Shapiro. Crime boss Harold Ko and Martin Shapiro are suspected of smuggling drugs from Hong Kong to New York. A surveillance of Shapiro's bodyguard Benny Garucci indicates that Ko may have taken her to Hong Kong for ransom. Wong and his new partner Danny Garoni travel to the colony, where they encounter local contacts Stan Jones, Hing Lee, and Hing's daughter Siu Ling.

The officers evade Ko's attempts to have them killed at a massage parlor and again at their hotel, while Royal Hong Kong Police chief superintendent Whitehead is reluctant to provide assistance, insisting that Ko is an upstanding citizen. Garoni and Wong attend a charity function hosted by Ko and confront him publicly. The next day, Wong, Garoni, and Jones discover that Hing Lee has been murdered. Garoni follows Garruci to a shipyard where Ko's drug lab is located and Laura Shapiro is held. In a meeting between Ko and Garucci, it is revealed that Shapiro's daughter was kidnapped because her father did not pay for Ko's last shipment.

Wong, Garoni and Jones raid the drug lab, destroy it and save Laura in the process. Garoni, however, is shot by Garucci and held hostage unless Billy returns Laura to Ko. Wong decides to leave her with Superintendent Whitehead. Wong meets Ko and Garucci at the shipyard, and learns that Superintendent Whitehead—was on Ko's payroll the whole time—has delivered Laura to his boss. Wong fights Garucci and Ko's guards, killing the former. Stan Jones and Siu Ling arrive to help rescue Garoni and Laura. Ko escapes in a helicopter, but Wong commandeers a crane and drops its contents onto his helicopter. With Ko dead and Laura saved, Billy and Danny return home and are given a NYPD Medal of Honor.

=== Hong Kong version ===
Jackie Chan's domestic version, while tweaking or removing ancillary content from Glickenhaus' version, adds an entirely new subplot. The first involves a woman named May-Fong Ho, who now works as a dancer under the alias of Sally after Ko had her father, one of his business associates, murdered. She is the one who connects Wong with Hing Lee, her father's old partner. Unbeknownst to Sally and Wong, one of Ko's men overhears the conversation.

Later, Benny Garucci expresses his concern to Ko's bodyguard, Ho Dai-Wai, about Garoni and Wong's investigation. Ho offers to help. That night, Hing Lee meets with an informant named Wing who reveals to him where Laura is being held. They are suddenly attacked by Benny Garucci and several henchmen. Later, Wong and Siu Ling find Lee and Wing's dead bodies. Realizing that Sally may be in danger, Wong pays her a visit and discovers that Sally's substitute maid, who works for Ko, has planted a bomb under her bed. Wong defuses the bomb. The massage parlor manager shows up, and is revealed to be Sally's uncle. Having fallen out of favor with Ko after failing to kill Garoni and Wong, the uncle reveals where Laura is held. Before assaulting Ko's lair, Wong escorts Sally and her uncle to the airport so they can start a new life in the U.S.

== Cast ==
- Jackie Chan as Billy Wong
- Danny Aiello as Danny Garoni
- Moon Lee as Soo Ling
- Roy Chiao as Harold Ko
- Peter Yang as Lee Hing
- Bill Wallace as Benny Garucci
- Victor Arnold as NYPD Captain Stanton
- Kim Bass as Stan Jones
- Richard Clarke as RHKPF Superintendent Whitehead
- Saun Ellis as Laura Shapiro
- Ronan O'Casey as NYPD Commissioner
- Patrick James Clarke as Michael Alexander
- Becky Ann Baker as Samantha Alexander
- Jesse Cameron-Glickenhaus as Jesse Alexander
- Ron Dandrea as Martin Shapiro
- Ron Parady as Bob Cantrell
- Sandy Alexander as Gang Leader
- Shum Wai as Massage Parlor Manager
- David Ho Wing-hin as Ho Dai-wai
- Big John Studd as Huge Hood
- John Spencer as Pilot
- Mike Starr as Hood
- Joe Wong as Sergeant Chan
- Alan Gibbs as Gunman
- Joe Maruzzo as Marina Attendant

Hong Kong version only

- Sally Yeh as May Fung Ho / Sally
- Lee Hoi-sang as Wing

== Production ==
=== Development ===
An early incarnation of The Protector featured a different story written by veteran director Robert Clouse, and was going to be produced by Golden Harvest's go-to American partner Fred Weintraub, with a Christmas 1982 start date. However, that version was delayed after Project A went over schedule, then shelved. It would subsequently be repackaged as China O'Brien, an American launchpad for the studio's next contract star, Cynthia Rothrock. The film was rebooted when Golden Harvest's head of overseas production Tom Gray reached out to director James Glickenhaus based on the success of The Exterminator. The Exterminator had opened the same week as The Big Brawl, Golden Harvest's previous attempt at an American vehicle for Jackie Chan, and outgrossed it at the box office.

Glickenhaus and Chan traveled to the 1984 Cannes Film Market to discuss the venture, which was promoted there under the slogan "When the no. 1 action director meets the no. 1 action star... Watch out!"

=== Filming ===
Photography was announced to start on October 1, 1984, in New York City. The New York sessions consisted mostly of exteriors bookending the film. An avid motorsports fan, Glickenhaus owned the "Manhattan Express" powerboat seen in the East River chase, although only a replica was detonated at the end of it. That stunt was not executed by Chan, but by his friend and double Cheung Wing-fat. The rest of filming, including some of the interiors set in New York, took place two months later in Hong Kong. Chan suffered hand injuries during the shoot.

==== Conflict between Glickenhaus and Chan ====
The making of The Protector was a frustrating affair for both director and star. Chan found that western filmmakers did not put the same emphasis on fight choreography, complaining that he was given as little as two days to film some fights, when he could spend as much as one month in Hong Kong. For his part, the director was put off by Chan's repeated trips to Japan to promote his musical endeavors, which forced some day sequences to be shot during the night. Whereas Hong Kong had already begun breaking up fight scenes into shorter segments offering curated camera angles, Glickenhaus remained dead set on the use of a traditional master shot. On the other hand, the American, who favored a gritty atmosphere, looked down on the visual artifices employed by his Hong Kong peers to amp up the action, such as undercranking, which he refused to do.

Chan also disliked having to play an American character despite his limited grasp of English. A dialogue coach was present on set, but had to resort to visual cues to help Chan follow blocking, further hampering his performance. He remembered Glickenhaus telling him: "'You must act like Clint Eastwood. You are New York police.' [...] I'm New York police?! What about my English? Everyday on the set, I just practice: 'New Yawk. I come from New Yawk. New Yawk'". However, in his autobiography, Chan says that the decision to rebrand him as an Eastwood-type enforcer was spearheaded by Golden Harvest executive Andre Morgan, in reaction to the underwhelming reception of The Big Brawl, which retained aspects of Chan's Asian style.

The star recalled phoning Golden Harvest executive Leonard Ho and threatening to walk in hopes of having the director relieved from his duties, only to be told that his contract was ironclad. Glickenhaus, though, has maintained that his rapport with Chan remained civil over the course of the shoot, and that he had clearly spelled out to him beforehand what type of picture they were making. He also pointed out that he had been solicited to direct by Chan's own team, which could not possibly have ignored the radical departure his hiring represented.

=== Post-production ===
Bill Wallace's lines were redubbed after Glickenhaus deemed his performance subpar. The MPAA demanded a few cuts to the original bar room gunfight to help the film secure an R rating.

Dissatisfied with Glickenhaus' work, Chan extensively re-edited the film, re-shot some scenes, and added brand new material written by Edward Tang with the aim of pleasing his established fan base while softening the American director's exploitative style.

In a 1996 interview, Glickenhaus said that he was unfamiliar with the Hong Kong version, but maintained that he had final cut on the picture, and therefore Golden Harvest did not have the right to change it. However, in 2012, he mentioned that Golden Harvest boss Raymond Chow had asked for his blessing before letting Chan re-cut it, and had even paid him an additional fee for the new version as a courtesy.

== Version differences ==
=== Hong Kong ===
In addition to a number of cuts and tweaks to existing scenes, the following changes most significantly impacted the film:

- All dialogue was dubbed into Cantonese.
- A new Hong Kong-friendly subplot was added, featuring music star Sally Yeh and martial arts actor Lee Hoi-sang.
- Chan, Aiello, and Wallace were brought back to reshoot the final fight.
- Several action scenes were re-edited to increase pacing. In some instances, slow-motion shots were added or removed, in others footage was sped up (to simulate undercranking).
- All cursing has been excised and American slang replaced. The HK edit dubs all of the English dialog without properly translating the cursing, sometimes changing the entire context of lines.
- All female nudity has been excised, with the drug lab re-shot to show fully dressed lab workers, and the nude masseuse being cut.
- The music is slightly different in certain scenes, and Chip Taylor's end credit song is replaced by a repeated score cue.

In total, the Hong Kong cut runs 92 minutes, approximately 3 minutes shorter than the American cut.

=== Japanese extended version ===
The Japanese version of The Protector can be described as "an extended version" of Jackie Chan's edit, with some differences:

- The opening credits are in English, but feature Sally Yeh's name.
- While a full Japanese dub was later made for TV, the standard Japanese version has all scenes taking places in the U.S. using the English audio track, and all scenes taking place in Hong Kong contain the Cantonese dub. However, the sound mix of the English scenes more closely resembles that of the Cantonese version.
- A few cuts made for the Hong Kong version have been reinstated, and are now voiced in Cantonese to match their setting, while a few lines of the original Cantonese dub have been tweaked elsewhere to establish continuity with the reinstated footage. Some scenes that premiered in the Hong Kong cut are now voiced in English when location appropriate, rather than dubbed in Cantonese as with the Hong Kong version.
- The Japanese version exclusively contains the outtake credits.

== Release ==
=== Theatrical ===
The Protector opened in the New York metropolitan area on August 23, 1985. It later toured the country in a piecemeal release that stretched across nine months and bypassed many major markets, such as Atlanta. In California, the film filled a few dates in the Central Valley during the pre-holiday lull starting on November 22, 1985, before resurfacing for a drive-in run in Los Angeles and the Bay Area on May 23, 1986. For some of those later bookings, it was packaged in a double feature with Cobra, which opened at the same time from Warner. The Protector also received a touring release in Canada, which started in Toronto on October 7, 1985.

=== Home media ===
In the U.S., The Protector made its home video debut on VHS and Betamax from Warner Home Video on May 23, 1986. Warner also published a LaserDisc at an unknown date.

The film was released on DVD, also by Warner, on June 2, 2002. This was the first time the U.S. version was released with extra footage from the bar gunfight. It arrived on Blu-ray through Shout! Factory on January 15, 2013, in a double feature with Crime Story. That disc included both the U.S. and Hong Kong cuts of the film. Various international pressings have offered their own minor variants of the picture.

== Reception ==
=== Box office ===
In North America, Box Office Mojo credits The Protector with a tally of US$981,817 during its limited run, equivalent to around $3 million adjusted for inflation in 2024. Chan's re-edited version grossed HK$13,917,612 (US$1,786,428) in Hong Kong, a respectable sum, but significantly less than any of Chan's domestic films at the time.

Elsewhere, it earned a decent response in Asian countries such as Japan and South Korea. In Europe, available figures show a tepid reception although France, where The Big Brawl had been a surprise hit, was kinder to the film than most. In that country, Samuel Hadida's Metropolitan Filmexport, then very much an exploitation distributor, bought the rights to Chan's old comedy Half a Loaf of Kung Fu and quickly retitled it Le Protecteur to ride on the release of his new vehicle.

=== Critical response ===
Contemporary reviews for the film were mixed. Rick Kogan of the Chicago Tribune was positive, calling the film "an interesting combination of adventure film clichés and pleasant surprises". He mentioned the "style and invention" of the action scenes, as well as the "fresh and clean if not terribly high budget look" created by director James Glickenhaus. He found Chan to be "a most likeable actor" while Aiello "ma[de] for a perfect partner." Trade magazine Variety was also positive, writing that the opening speedboat chase "rival[ed] James Bond pictures for elaborate thrills" and that the film was elevated by "the tongue-in-cheek humor running throughout" as well as Chan's "superhuman acrobatics". Video Review praised "a superior martial-arts-oriented adventure" tailored to bring Chan into the mainstream like Chuck Norris' Code of Silence, but opined that mangled English made it a harder watch than it should have been.

Jon Pareles of the New York Times wrote that "[t]he movie has an adequate budget but few original ideas." Although he noted that it had "comparatively few straight fight scenes" relative to Chan's previous efforts, he accepted that "[e]xcept for a dud of a climactic hand-to-hand between Mr. Chan and Mr. Wallace, the action stays snappy — and far better than Mr. Chan's attempts to emote." Jan Herman of the New York Daily News wrote that "[t]he movie opens with vivid scenes in the South Bronx and Manhattan, and a speedboat-cum-helicopter chase down the East River. But then things get pretty dry." He complained that the film suffered from a "lack of chopsocky" and Chan's "barely comprehensible" English.

Desmond Ryan of The Philadelphia Inquirer criticized Chan's decision to work with the director of The Exterminator, noting that while "Glickenhaus has cleaned up his act somewhat", he still pandered to the audience's "Bernie Goetz fantasies". Lou Cedrone of the Baltimore Evening Sun was negative, noting that Jackie Chan "is given no chance to show his stuff". He complained that "the film is busy with stunts, but that's all they are", and a "chase, which at this point in movie history is instant yawn". He complained about cliches such as villains "involved in the usual dope running" and "a madman armed with a chainsaw", concluding that "The Protector is, by turn, obvious then embarrassing."

=== Glickenhaus' response ===
In an interview with James Glickenhaus by Bey Logan held before Chan achieved mainstream success with American audiences, Logan mentioned that many of his fans were disappointed with the movie. An unfazed Glickenhaus responded, "Well, you know that's still the most successful Jackie Chan movie internationally and always will be because the American audience, the mainstream audience will never sit still for Jackie's style of action".

== Soundtrack ==
The film's soundtrack was composed by Ken Thorne. It was released on LP by Easy Street Records in 1985. It was re-issued on CD by soundtrack specialists Dragon's Den Records on July 7, 2022. The American version features the song "One Up for the Good Guys", performed by ATV Music Group performer Chip Taylor.

== Legacy ==
Chan later directed Police Story (1985) as a response to this film. It would take over a decade until Chan starred in a successful American project, with Rush Hour (1998).

=== Ryan Walters scandal ===
In 2025, the film was the subject of a scandal concerning Oklahoma Superintendent of Public Instruction Ryan Walters. That July, a television in Walters' office displayed scenes from the movie containing nude women, during a Board of Education meeting. Walters initially denied that claims, asserting that his television was not connected to the internet, but this was later proven false. The nude scenes triggered a state investigation into what had been playing on Walter's television during the meeting. Walters left his post in September 2025, shortly after the investigation's conclusion.

== See also ==
- Jackie Chan filmography
