= Yes, Madam (1985 film) =

1985 Hong Kong film by Corey Yuen

- Film poster for Yes, Madam!
- Traditional Chinese: 皇家師姐
- Simplified Chinese: 皇家师姐
- Literal meaning: Royal Elder Sister
- Hanyu Pinyin: Huángjiā Shījiě
- Jyutping: Wong4 Gaa1 Si1 Ze2
- Directed by: Corey Yuen
- Written by: Barry Wong
- Produced by: Sammo Hung
- Starring: John Shum; Michelle Yeoh; Mang Hoi; Cynthia Rothrock; Tsui Hark
- Cinematography: Bill Wong Chung-piu
- Edited by: Sek Chi-kong; Keung Chuen-tak; Peter Cheung
- Music by: Romeo Diaz; Tang Siu-lam
- Production companies: D & B Films
- Release date: 30 November 1985
- Running time: 93 minutes
- Country: Hong Kong
- Language: Cantonese
- Box office: HK$10,019,862

Yes, Madam (simplified Chinese: 皇家师姐; traditional Chinese: 皇家師姐; pinyin: Huángjiā Shījiě; Jyutping: Wong Gaa Si Ze) is a 1985 Hong Kong action film directed by Corey Yuen, and produced by Sammo Hung, who also appears in a cameo in the film. The film stars Michelle Yeoh as Senior Inspector Ng who teams up with Inspector Carrie Morris (Cynthia Rothrock) to get a hold of microfilm which has been taken unknowingly by low level thieves Asprin (Mang Hoi) and Strepsil (John Shum).

The film was the 21st-highest-grossing film of the year in Hong Kong and gave Mang an award for Best Supporting Actor at the 5th Hong Kong Film Awards. It has been described as the first film of the "girls with guns" subgenre. Yes, Madam received several sequels in the In the Line of Duty film series.

== Plot ==
In Hong Kong, Inspector Ng manages to stop the theft of an armored car by a group of criminals. In another part of the city, a deal is being made between a Westerner and an assassin. After the deal goes sour, the assassin kills the Westerner while the duo of Asprin and Strepsil enter to pickpocket the Westerner and steal his passport. Unknown to all of them, the Westerner had secret microfilm that contained details of a group of criminals involved in illegal activities, most notably the crooked businessman Mr. Tin. Inspector Ng arrives later and is heartbroken to discover that the dead man was Richard Nornen, with whom she was romantically involved.

After authorities find out that Nornen had been working undercover and that the microfilm is missing, investigator Carrie Morris from Scotland Yard is brought in to assist Ng in recovering it. The microfilm is in the possession of some petty thieves, whilst the police are looking for it to prove the guilt of Tin and his accomplices, who naturally want it destroyed. Meanwhile, Asprin and Strepsil return the passport to Panadol. Panadol sells the passport to a criminal who attempts to leave the country with it, but is thwarted by Morris, who halts him at the airport. Ng allows the criminal to leave but not on the plane, allowing both Morris and Ng to track down the source of the phony passport to Panadol. With Panadol in custody, he inadvertently mentions Asprin and Strepsil as accomplices.

Tin has the most to lose from the microfilm and sends three thugs to Asprin and Strepsil in order to get it from them. Strepsil admits defeat to them and gives over the microfilm. Ng and Morris then attempt to arrest Tin for possession of the item, but find that the microfilm in his possession is another one of Panadol's fakes and are unable to arrest him. Tin's thugs manage to find Panadol and beat him so severely that he dies, while Asprin and Strepsil were going to sell the real microfilm for thousands of dollars.

When Strepsil finds that Tin has the microfilm, Asprin and Strepsil, with the two police officers Morris and Ng closely following, arrive at Tin's house for a final showdown. During the battle, the microfilm is destroyed and Ng and Morris are about to be arrested for trespassing. Asprin, who had just learned of Panadol's death, becomes enraged, grabs a police officer's gun and shoots Tin to death, who was about to go free because of the destruction of the evidence.

== Cast ==
- John Shum as Strepsil
- Michelle Yeoh as Senior Inspector Ng (as Michelle Khan)
- Mang Hoi as Asprin
- Cynthia Rothrock as Senior Inspector Carrie Morris
- Tsui Hark as Panadol
- Sammo Hung as Sifu
- Richard Ng as Weak Heart
- David Chiang as Sifu's roommate
- Wu Ma as Policeman
- Billy Lau as Parking Inspector
- Dick Wei as Willie
- James Tien as Henry Tin
- Chung Fat as Big Moustache
- Fruit Chan as Fruit
- Chin Ka-lok as Henry's thug
- Hsiao Ho as Henry's thug
- Corey Yuen as Policeman

== Production ==
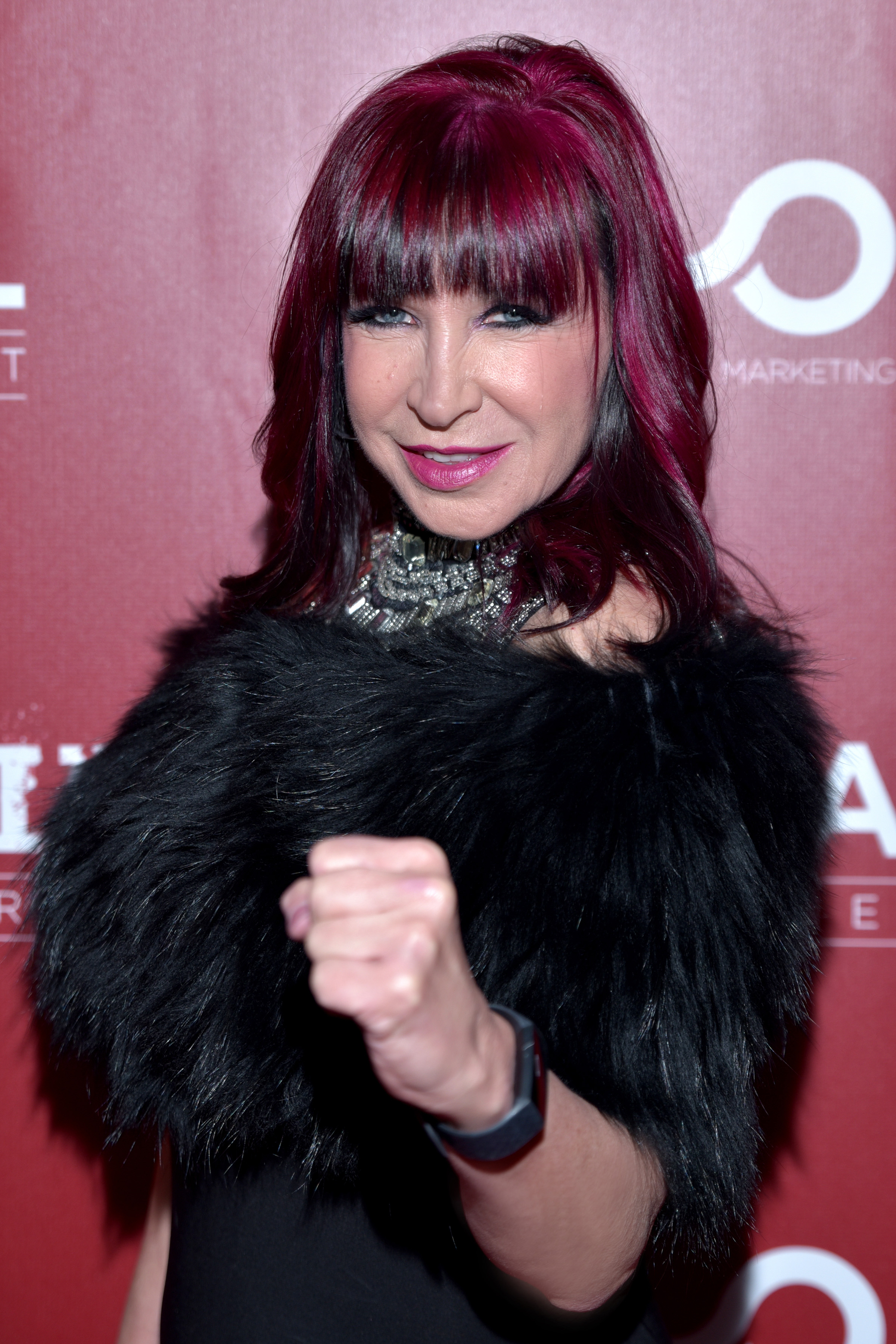
Cynthia Rothrock in 2018

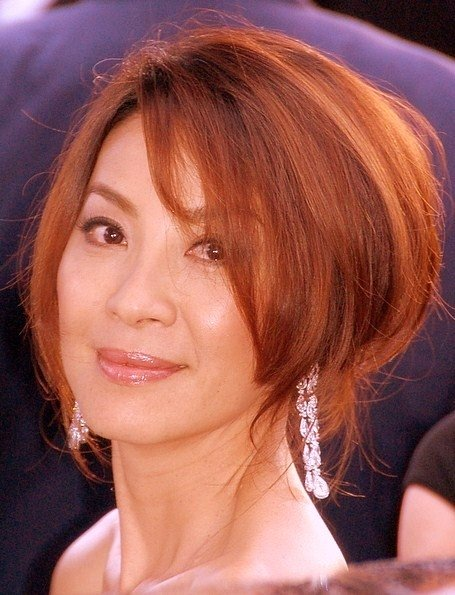
Michelle Yeoh in 2007

Yes, Madam was the debut film for Cynthia Rothrock and the first starring role in a feature film for Michelle Yeoh.

While working a martial arts demonstration team, the magazine Inside Kung Fu contacted Cynthia Rothrock's team stating that D&B Film was looking for a new male lead to play a Bruce Lee-esque character in a film. Despite looking for a male lead the team had a few women on their team and decided to bring them to demonstrate their skills as well. The studio producers were so impressed with Rothrock's martial arts skills that they offered her the role in the film on the spot and changed the lead from a male to female. When arriving to shoot the film, Rothrock was surprised by her role as she assumed she was going to be in a traditional period martial arts film.

Yes, Madam was the first starring role in a feature film for Michelle Yeoh, who had previously won the 1983 Miss World Malaysia contest. After winning the contest she met D&B executive producer Dickson Poon who cast her in a small role in a television commercial with entertainer Jackie Chan in 1984. Her role in the commercial caught the attention of D&B Films. Yeoh had previously played small roles in Sammo Hung's film Owl vs. Dumbo (1985) and Twinkle Twinkle Lucky Stars (1985). For Yes, Madam!, Yeoh took to stunt work opposed to allowing a double for every stunt. To train for her role, she worked out in a gym for eight hours a day. Yeoh stated that both herself and Rothrock did not want the film to be "too hard core", saying that "We wanted the family to come in and watch it".

According to Rothrock, the airport scene was shot at Kai Tak Airport in three nights between 12:00 midnight and 5:00 a.m. to avoid airport traffic. The film's finale took 30 days to shoot. Rothrock sustained a head wound during her fight scene with Dick Wei. When filming resumed after her wound was stitched up, a stand-in for Wei was brought in to film the shot of Rothrock doing her scorpion kick on Wei's character, presumably because Wei was anticipating payback from her.

The film's score was composed by Romeo Diaz. The score also featured parts of the soundtrack from John Carpenter's film Halloween (1978).

== Release ==
Yes, Madam was released in Hong Kong on 20 November 1985. The film grossed HK$10,019,862 at the box office, becoming the 21st-highest grossing-film of the year in Hong Kong. The popularity of both Yes, Madam and Royal Warriors lead to a small wave of Hong Kong film companies to make their own films featuring fighting females such as the In the Line of Duty and the Black Cat film series. The film was released in the Philippines by Asia Films as The Super Cops on 28 January 1988.

=== Home media ===
Yes, Madam was released and re-released on home media under various titles. In the United States, it was first released under the title Supercops. Royal Warriors, another film starring Yeoh, was released together with Yes, Madam in the European market under the titles Ultra Force 1 and Ultra Force 2, respectively. Elsewhere, the films were re-titled In the Line of Duty and In the Line of Duty 2. The In the Line of Duty films received several sequels.

Yes, Madam was released under its original title on DVD on 17 November 1998. In 2002, the film was released on DVD under the title Police Assassins in the United Kingdom. In Hong Kong, Yes Madam was released on Blu-ray on 7 June 2011 by CMS Media Limited. The Blu-ray features both Cantonese and Mandarin language options and English subtitles. The film was released on Blu-ray in the UK by Eureka Entertainment on 12 December 2022, featuring both original and international cuts remastered in 1080p, the English dub of the original cut remixed in 5.1 surround, and audio commentary and interview with Rothrock.

== Critical reception ==
From retrospective reviews, the BBC gave the film a three star rating, describing the film as "tongue-in-cheek nonsense but fun nonetheless" and praising the fight scenes involving Yeoh and Rothrock. Peter Goddard (The Toronto Star) stated that despite the lead of Rothrock and Yeoh, the film was still focusing on the male actors. The review commented on Corey Yuen's action choreography, describing it as "slick" and "cartoony" but with no "particularly memorable" scenes. In his book The Hong Kong Filmography, 1977-1997, John Charles gave the film a seven out of ten, opining that "like all D&B genre pictures that followed, the storyline is routine but the action certainly isn't." Both Goddard and Charles highlighted a scene where Michelle Yeoh jumps backwards over a rail and through plate glass.

== Accolades ==
Accolades
| Ceremony | Category | Recipient | Outcome |
|---|---|---|---|
| 5th Hong Kong Film Awards | Best Supporting Actor | Mang Hoi | Won |
| 5th Hong Kong Film Awards | Best New Performer | Michelle Yeoh | Nominated |
| 5th Hong Kong Film Awards | Best Action Direction | Corey Yuen and Mang Hoi | Nominated |

== See also ==
- List of action films of the 1980s
- List of Hong Kong films of 1985
- Sammo Hung filmography
