= In the Line of Duty (film series) =

Hong Kong girls with guns film series

- Cover of Blu-ray box set containing first 4 installments
- Traditional Chinese: 皇家師姐
- Simplified Chinese: 皇家师姐
- Literal meaning: Royal elder sister
Transcriptions
Standard Mandarin
- Hanyu Pinyin: Huáng Jiā Shī Jiě
Yue: Cantonese
- Jyutping: Wong⁴ gaa¹ si¹ ze²
- Country: Hong Kong

In the Line of Duty, sometimes referred to as the Yes Madam series, is a series of girls with guns feature films produced by Hong Kong movie studio D & B Films which star, in the first two, Michelle Yeoh, and, in subsequent installments, Cynthia Khan as a Royal Hong Kong Police Force officer who combines the use of firearms with kickboxing. The film Royal Warriors would be exported with the title In the Line of Duty and, due to its success, the film Yes Madam!, released one year prior, was retitled In the Line of Duty II: The Police Assassins as an export. Due to the overwhelming financial achievement of the films under the In the Line of Duty titles, D & B would start utilizing the In the Line of Duty title in their native Hong Kong market, with the third film being the first to originally use the In the Line of Duty name, which in turn would be retroactively applied to the two Michelle Yeoh vehicles. This would continue with the fourth entry before the series would revert to using individual unique titles (though the later sequels would still be exported with the In the Line of Duty naming scheme).

The official series contains seven movies produced by D & B Films before going defunct after the release of the final entry Sea Wolves. Two other unofficial sequels would be released afterwards in various territories solely for the fact that they starred Cynthia Khan but playing different characters. A 1990 film titled The Queen's High starring Cynthia Khan was marketed in some territories as In the Line of Duty: The Beginning but it is unrelated to the franchise. Out of the official series of seven films, Cynthia Khan playing the character of Inspector Rachel Yeung in parts three through seven would be the only carry-over from film to film (other than a small supporting character) as there is no plot, narrative or character connection between the first two Michelle Yeoh movies and subsequent entries starring Cynthia Khan.

== Films ==
List indicator
- This table shows the principal characters and the actors who have portrayed them throughout the franchise.
- A dark grey cell indicates the character was not in the film, or that the character's presence in the film has not yet been announced.

Character	Official Series							Unofficial Sequels	
Character	Royal Warriors	Yes, Madam!	In the Line of Duty III	In the Line of Duty IV	The Middle Man	Forbidden Arsenal	Sea Wolves	Death Triangle	Yes Madam 5
Character	皇家戰士	皇家師姐	皇家師姐III 雌雄大盗	皇家師姐IV 直擊証人	皇家師姐伍 中間人	地下兵工廠	海狼	末路狂花	危情追蹤5
Character	1986	1985	1988	1989	1990	1991	1991	1992	1996
Michelle Yip	Michelle Yeoh								
Michael Wong	Michael Wong			Michael Wong					
Inspector Ng		Michelle Yeoh							
Inspector Carrie Morris		Cynthia Rothrock							
Inspector Rachel Yeung			Cynthia Khan	Cynthia Khan	Cynthia Khan	Cynthia Khan	Cynthia Khan		
Officer Donny Yan				Donnie Yen					
Chief Inspector Lee				Wai Gei Shun			Wai Gei Shun		
Lai Ching								Cynthia Khan	Cynthia Khan

1. Yes, Madam! (皇家師姐, 1985) a.k.a. Police Assassins 2 or II (UK VHS), Police Assassins (UK DVD, AU DVD); co-starring Cynthia Rothrock
2. Royal Warriors (皇家戰士, 1986) a.k.a. Police Assassins (UK VHS); co-starring Hiroyuki Sanada and Michael Wong
3. In the Line of Duty III (皇家師姐III 雌雄大盗, 1988) a.k.a. Force of the Dragon (UK VHS); co-starring Hiroshi Fujioka
4. In the Line of Duty 4 (皇家師姐IV 直擊証人, 1989) a.k.a. In the Line of Duty (UK); co-starring Donnie Yen
5. Middle Man (皇家師姐伍 中間人, 1990) a.k.a. In the Line of Duty V: Middle Man (USA); co-starring David Wu and Elvina Kong
6. Forbidden Arsenal (地下兵工廠, 1991); a.k.a. In the Line of Duty 6: Forbidden Arsenal; co-starring Waise Lee
7. Sea Wolves (海狼, 1991); starring Gary Chau and Simon Yam
8. Yes, Madam '92: A Serious Shock (末路狂花, 1992, a.k.a. Death Triangle): A return to the series with Moon Lee and Cynthia Khan.
9. Yes Madam 5 (危情追蹤, 1995, a.k.a. Red Force 5)

== Home media ==
Royal Warriors and In the Line of Duty 4 would be the only two entries in the series to receive official DVD releases in the United States by 20th Century Fox in 2004. They were brand new remastered, enhanced widescreen transfers.

The first five entries, Royal Warriors, Yes, Madam!, In the Line of Duty III, In the Line of Duty IV and In the Line of Duty V: Middle Man would be released on Region 0 DVD by Universe Laser in Hong Kong in 1999. These releases contained ported over Letterboxed, non-anamorphic transfers from Universe Laser's original Laserdisc releases.

Hong Kong distributor Joy Sales would re-release Royal Warriors and Yes, Madam! in remastered anamorphic versions on both DVD and Blu-ray in 2011. Joy Sales would also release parts 3-7 with new widescreen enhanced transfers (but not remastered) on DVD and VCD under their "Legendary Collection" banner.

Eureka Entertainment would release parts I-IV on Blu-ray in the U.K. in March 2023

88 Films released a deluxe edition Blu-ray set of the first four films along with posters and a book in May 2023. This would be the first time Yes, Madam and In the Line of Duty III would get official home media releases in the United States.
