= Mr. Vampire =

1985 Hong Kong film by Ricky Lau

- Original Hong Kong film poster

Chinese name
- Traditional Chinese: 殭屍先生
- Simplified Chinese: 僵尸先生
Transcriptions
Standard Mandarin
- Hanyu Pinyin: Jiāngshī Xiānshēng
Yue: Cantonese
- Jyutping: Goeng1 Si1 Sin1 Sang1
- Directed by: Ricky Lau
- Written by: Sze-to Cheuk-hon; Barry Wong; Wong Ying
- Produced by: Sammo Hung
- Starring: Lam Ching-ying; Chin Siu-ho; Ricky Hui; Moon Lee; Yuen Wah; Billy Lau
- Cinematography: Peter Ngor
- Edited by: Peter Cheung
- Music by: Anders Nelsson; Alastair Monteith-Hodge; The Melody Bank
- Production companies: Bo Ho Films Co., Ltd. Paragon Films Ltd.
- Distributed by: Golden Harvest
- Release date: 7 November 1985
- Running time: 96 minutes
- Country: Hong Kong
- Language: Cantonese
- Budget: HK$8,500,000
- Box office: HK$20,092,129

Mr. Vampire (Chinese: 殭屍先生) is a 1985 Hong Kong comedy horror film directed by Ricky Lau and produced by Sammo Hung. The film's box office success led to the creation of a Mr. Vampire franchise, with the release of four sequels directed by Ricky Lau from 1986 to 1992, and subsequent similarly themed films with different directors released between 1987 and 1992, with Lam Ching-ying as the lead for the majority of them. The vampire of the film is based on the jiangshi, the hopping corpses of Chinese folklore (similar to both zombies and vampires). The film was released under the Chinese title 暫時停止呼吸 (literally: Hold Your Breath for a Moment) in Taiwan. The film was the breakthrough success of the jiangshi genre, a trend popular in Hong Kong during the 1980s, and established many of the genre's recognisable tropes.

== Plot ==
In Republican-era China, Master Kau makes a living as a Taoist priest who performs magic that maintains control over spirits and irrepressible vampires. Together with his inept students, Man-choi and Chau-sang, he resides in a large house protected from the spiritual world with talismans and amulets.

One day, he accepts an assignment from a wealthy businessman, Yam, to remove Yam's deceased father from his grave and rebury him, with the hopes that doing so will bring more prosperity to the Yam family. However, during the raising of the coffin, Kau notices the body, instead of in a decomposed state, is still intact. Knowing it has become a vampire, he has it moved to his house for further study.

Once in the house, Choi and Sang line the coffin with enchanted ink to safeguard the body, but forget to line the bottom of the coffin, causing the vampire to break out. It heads straight for Yam's home and savagely kills his son before going into hiding by dawn.

Wai, an incompetent police inspector who is smitten with Yam's daughter Ting, blames Kau for murdering Yam and arrests him. Kau is imprisoned and Yam's body is placed in a makeshift morgue near the jailhouse. Choi stays at Yam's house to protect Ting while Sang frees his master, only to witness Yam reawakening as a vampire. Kau and Sang manage to kill it after engaging it in battle. Wai realizes his mistake in framing Kau earlier and accepts the fact that another vampire is on the loose.

The vampire again invades Yam's house. Kau and Sang arrive in time to wound it and forcing it to flee, but not before it critically wounds Choi. Kau invites Ting to stay at his house for safety. The next morning, after examining Choi's wounds, Kau claims he too may become a vampire. He orders Sang to feed Choi glutinous rice, claiming it may decrease the vampire's venom in Choi's body and bring him back to his normal state. While purchasing the rice, however, the shady merchant deliberately mixes different kinds of rice in the bag, and an unwitting Sang accepts it. Before Sang can get home, he is lured by a mysterious woman into her house. He soon deduces she is a spirit, but she uses her supernatural power to seduce him. They sleep together for the night.

When Sang returns to Kau's house, the priest is quick to notice his student's predicament. That night, he silently follows Sang to the spirit's house. The spirit transforms into a hideous ghoul and attempts to kill Kau, but fails at the hands of his talismans. She bewitches Sang to turn on his master, but after a brief fight, Kau breaks the spell and she escapes.

The next night, Kau ties Sang to a chair and prepares to capture and eliminate the spirit. Sure enough, she arrives at their house and Kau chases her throughout. As Sang tries to free himself, Choi turns into a vampire and attacks him. Amidst the chaos, Kau restrains Choi and almost terminates the spirit, but stops when Sang begs him to let her go. Saddened she can no longer be with Sang, the spirit flies away.

Over the next few days, Kau restores Choi's health and turns him back to human. Wai brings in news that the vampire is now active again. When Kau leaves to investigate, the vampire, now in an almost demonic form, invades Kau's place. After pushing Choi off a balcony, it turns its attention to Ting and Wai, but Kau and Sang again divert its attention. Finally, Kau's fellow Taoist priest, Four Eyes, shows up by coincidence, and they manage to destroy the vampire by burning it alive.

== Cast ==
- Lam Ching-ying as Master Kau (九叔), a unibrowed priest specialising in Taoist supernatural arts
- Ricky Hui as Man-choi (文才), Kau's student
- Chin Siu-ho as Chau-sang (秋生), Kau's student
- Moon Lee as Ting-ting (婷婷), Master Yam's daughter
- Huang Ha as Master Yam (任老爺), a rich man. He is apparently killed by the vampire but later rises from the dead to become like his late father.
- Anthony Chan as Priest Four Eyes (四目道長), Kau's junior. He uses magic to control "hopping" corpses and transport them to their hometowns for burial.
- Pauline Wong as Jade (董小玉), a female ghost who seduces Chau-sang
- Billy Lau as Wai (阿威), the cowardly police inspector. He is also Ting-ting's cousin.
- Yuen Wah as Elder Ren (任長老), "hopping" corpse

== Production ==
=== Casting ===
Director Ricky Lau wanted a fresh-faced girl whom people were unfamiliar with to play the role of Mr Yam's daughter so he avoided choosing a well-known actress. He spotted dancer Moon Lee at a performance and approached her and asked "Are you interested in acting as you'd fit into a part I have?"

Lam Ching-ying was recommend to the director by Sammo Hung to play the main role. The director had seen Lam before on The Prodigal Son which the director had worked on. The director noted in an interview that "He seems cold but actually he is with a good heart" that was why he was suitable for the role.

The director had still not settled on an actress to play the ghost's role. The role ended up going to Wong Siu-fung, who impressed Ricky Lau in her previous film Person at the End. Chin Siu-ho was chosen because he knew Kung Fu and all about action scenes. The director noted in an interview "he was serious and used no stuntman."

Sammo Hung (producer) hired Billy Lau to provide additional comedy to Mr Vampire.

=== Writing and inspiration ===
According to the producer Sammo Hung, the idea for Mr. Vampire originated through childhood stories he heard from his mother who was also an actress. One of the major sources of inspiration for the film Mr. Vampire came from a collection of supernatural tales called Strange Stories from a Chinese Studio by Qing dynasty writer Pu Songling. Mr. Vampire is based on a story of a resurrected corpse. The script was not written by Ricky Lau alone. It was written by many script writers, including Roy Szeto (Chak Han), Wong Ying and Barry Wong (Ping-Yiu). When the script was finished, Eric Tsang reviewed it. Sammo Hung also reviewed it and gave Lau some ideas.

In an interview the director mentioned "Compared with nowadays, the situation was different because now they often use less time to finish the script." In the original script, the ghost (Jade) was written to die during the film but during filming, Lau decided to change the ending and keep her alive so that could it would be more romantic.

The director and writers used a cheap gimmick only once, when they made a man in poor quality gorilla suit chase the characters down a mountain.

=== Filming and locations ===
Filming lasted more than five months to almost half a year. On the set, the actors would sometimes crack jokes, and if director Ricky Lau liked them, he would retain those scenes in the film. The love scene that contained no violence took two weeks to complete, in addition to a further three weeks of shooting in Taiwan.

The production team built a village that appeared in the opening and ending scenes of the film, while a few scenes were shot on a standing set near Taipei because they lacked a good studio set of a long street running into the distance, which could be done by CGI in more recent times. The scene in which a dead body was found was shot in Taiwan on a set with stone arches. In that set, a real street was constructed from stone, and has been reused for other films and television series. In Hong Kong, most studios could not afford a standing set. It took one week in Taiwan to set up the sets mentioned above. The Golden Harvest studios were used as the set for the scene where Master Kau is in jail.

The scene where the body is being exhumed was filmed just out of the New Territories in Hong Kong. The background has been used in movies such as The Young Master and the end fight in The 36th Chamber of Shaolin. Also filmed in the New Territories were scenes where the police went to find the vampire in the cave and the scene in which a body is being burnt.

Producer Sammo Hung visited the set less frequently to promote a relaxed atmosphere as he was aware that his presence may make the cast and crew nervous. Hung took a hands-off role on the film and entrusted Mr Vampire to protégé director Ricky Lau.

A real snake was used in the scene which showed one being cut, and was later used to make snake soup. This was because the production team could not afford a fake snake. This was also the case in a scene where a chicken's blood is needed and its throat is cut and a bowl is held under its neck to collect the blood.

Mr. Vampire is set in the Early Republic, as can be seen from the five-coloured-star cap emblems on the "modern" uniforms, but the vampire's costume belonged to the previous dynasty, the Qing dynasty, contrary to a commentator's notes. Oddly in one scene after Chau-sang woke up, Ting-ting had a white flower in her hair which signifies morning but it is night time in the film.

Action scenes in the movie were designed by both the director and Chiny-Ying, who was an action director as well. There wasn't much time for the director and actors to sleep. The director and actors had 2 shifts (12 hours per shift). The Day shift is from seven in the morning until seven in the evening. The Night shift is from seven in the evening work until seven in the morning and many actors didn't really sleep for maybe two weeks.

During filming in the extremely hot summer months, Yuen Wah suffered as he was not allowed to remove the plastic from his face. After several hours in the make-up chair, he would spend the working day unable to move, talk or eat properly. Ironically, Ricky Lau cut out many of Yuen's footage from the finished film, as he felt that too many vampire hopping would slow down the pace.

Near the end of shooting, Mr. Vampire, the cast and crew came under pressure to work faster, as the movie screening was around the corner.

Moon Lee recalls the Mr. Vampire shoot as a largely enjoyable experience. Lam Ching Ying always looked serious during filming. He was dedicated and professional, although friends have brought up his sense of humour.

It is long been rumoured that Hung effectively directed Mr Vampire on his own with the inexperienced Ricky Lau serving as his assistant. Hung has always denied the story and Chin Siu Ho has confirmed Ricky Lau as the true director of Mr. Vampire.

=== Stunts ===
At different parts of the movie, wires were used. The production staff had to take care of the wires. To ensure they do not show on screen, they would spray the wires in the same colour as the set background. If the wires were shown, they would have to take it overseas for editing which was not popular at that time. However, no wires were used in the scene where actor Chin Siu-ho performed a back-flip up the door.

Action director Yuen Wah doubled as a vampire for some of the more acrobatic shots, such as the end scene depicting the vampire being burnt (the flames and oil were real).

=== Music ===
Most of Mr. Vampire's atmospheric scores that were both spooky and humorous was mainly supplied by Anders Nelsson's music production company The Melody Bank. Jade's theme song, Gwai San Noeng (鬼新娘; Ghost Bride), was performed by the Jie'er Choir (傑兒合唱團). The music was written by Lee On-Tat and lyrics were written by Cheng Kwok-Kong.

=== Budget ===
Mr. Vampire was originally given a budget of HKD 4.5 million, but halfway through production, it was already depleted. The director then had to ask for more money and was given a further HKD 1 million to finish the film. After one week, the money was also spent. When the film was finally finished, it cost HKD 8.5 million. Sammo estimated the film would cost a HKD 2 to 3 million loss to Golden Harvest

== Accolades ==
Mr. Vampire was nominated for thirteen awards, including two for Best Supporting Actor (Billy Lau and Lam Ching-ying). Out of the thirteen nominations the film only received one award for Best Original Film Score.

Awards
Award	Category	Name	Result
5th Hong Kong Film Awards	Best Film	Mr. Vampire	Nominated
5th Hong Kong Film Awards	Best Original Film Score	Lo Ta-yu	Nominated
5th Hong Kong Film Awards	Best Director	Ricky Lau	Nominated
5th Hong Kong Film Awards	Best Screenplay	Wong Ying, Barry Wong, Sze-to Cheuk-hon	Nominated
5th Hong Kong Film Awards	Best Supporting Actor	Billy Lau	Nominated
5th Hong Kong Film Awards	Best Supporting Actor	Lam Ching-ying	Nominated
5th Hong Kong Film Awards	Best New Performer	Billy Lau	Nominated
5th Hong Kong Film Awards	Best Cinematography	Peter Ngor	Nominated
5th Hong Kong Film Awards	Best Film Editing	Peter Cheung	Nominated
5th Hong Kong Film Awards	Best Art Direction	Lam Sai-lok	Nominated
5th Hong Kong Film Awards	Best Action Direction	Sammo Hung Stunt Team	Nominated
5th Hong Kong Film Awards	Best Original Film Score	Melody Bank	Won
5th Hong Kong Film Awards	Best Original Film Song	鬼新娘	Nominated

== Box office ==
Mr. Vampire was given a midnight premier at Grand Ocean (Hong Kong). The director was so worried about the success of this movie as well as his directing career, he stood outside during the screening, greeting guests until he heard the audience starting to laugh.

Mr, Vampire ran in cinemas from 7 November 1985 to 4 December 1985, and grossed a total of HK$20,092,129. This was the same year that Sammo Hung and Jackie Chan's movies were at the box office, with My Lucky Stars, Police Story and Heart of Dragon all exceeding Mr. Vampire's considerable takings.

In South Korea, the film sold 47,824 box office tickets in Seoul City.

== Distribution rights and classification ==
Sino Cine Co Ltd bought the UK distribution rights to Mr. Vampire and the BBFC classified the film as '15' without any cuts and then it was released March 1986. The following year Chinatown Cinema bought the Australia distribution rights and the movie was classified 'M'(mature no one under the age of 15) it was classified 1 January 1986

In Canada the Manitoba Film Classification Board classified the film as 14 for Festival Cinema, Ontario Film Review Board classified Mr. Vampire 1 April 1986 as Restricted (18 years of age or older) and Régie du cinéma du Québec was classified 1986 as 14 and then reclassified 9 September 2004 as Visa général (General Rating, all ages)

In Singapore the movie was cut and classified as PG and later was reclassified to NC16 (Not suitable for children under 16)

== Critical reception ==
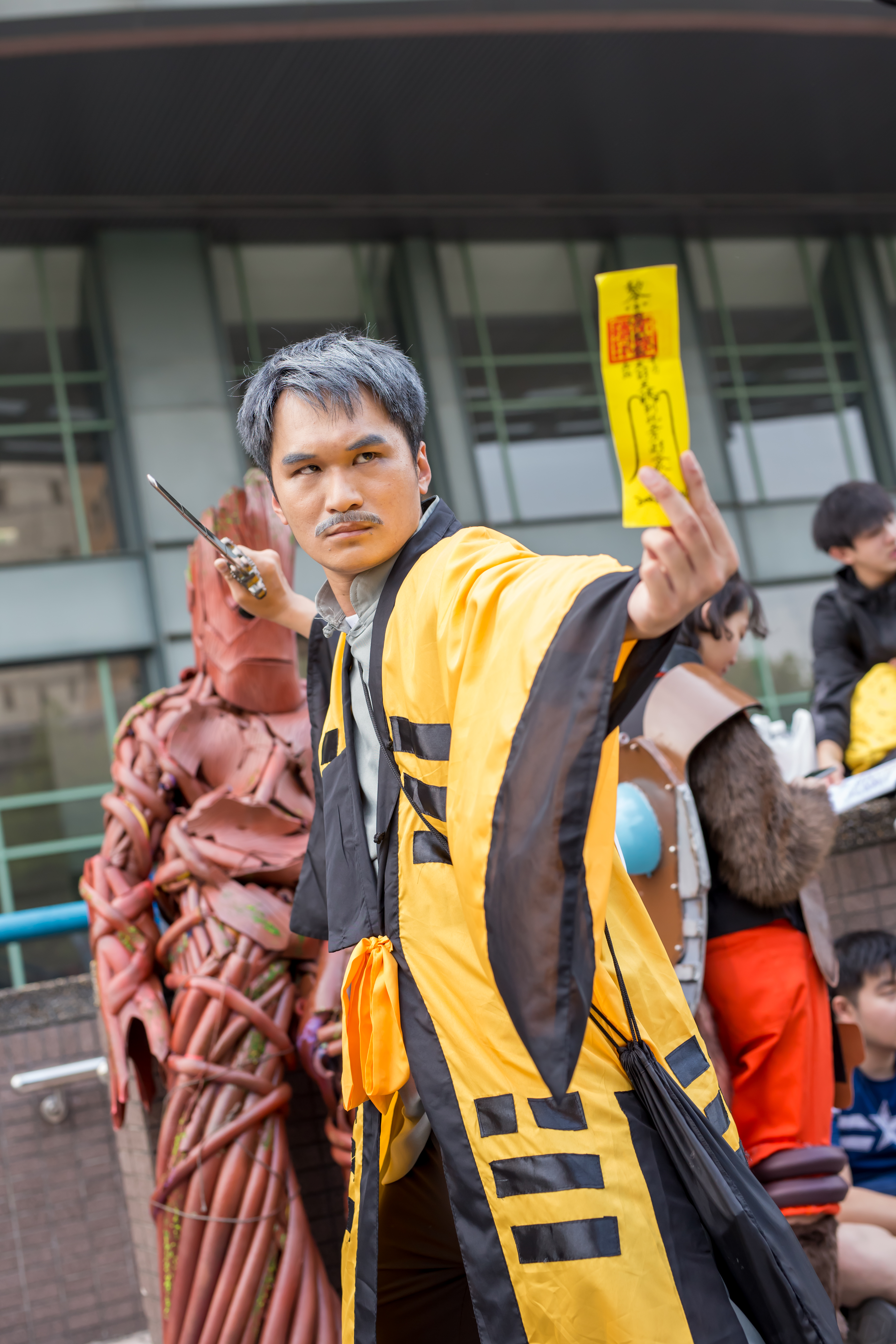
A cosplay of Lam Ching-ying's character Master Kau.

Mr. Vampire was well received in Taiwan, China, southeast Asia, and especially in Japan, where it inspired a vampire craze with toys and a lot of other merchandise that had a vampire on them.

The film was featured as part of Channel 4's Chinese Ghost Story season in 1990 introduced by Jonathan Ross being played alongside some similar movies in the genre including Encounters of the Spooky Kind, Zu Warriors from the Magic Mountain, Esprit d'amour, Spiritual Love and Rouge.

In a DVD commentary of Mr. Vampire, Bey Logan said "Mr. Vampire is very basic visual effects and was only really the start of visual effects in Hong Kong filmmaking."

LoveHKFilm described it as "quite possibly the seminal entry in HK's famous horror-comedy genre" and "a fun movie that showcases Lam Ching-Ying at his best."

The English language soundtrack made for Mr vampire is low quality, redubbing the characters with bland mid American accents. The sound effects are inadequate, clomping footsteps are added as a distracting effect. This version of the film is not widely circulated.

Mr. Vampire made the Hong Kong Film Archive's "100 Must-See Hong Kong Movies" at number 77. This list is in chronological order from 1916 to 1999 rather than order of importance.

== Spin off media ==
=== English version ===
Golden Harvest attempted to make an English-language version of Mr. Vampire under the title Demon Hunters. The film was produced by David Chan. However, the team could not get Lam Ching-ying to reprise his role because the latter was busy with another film overseas. Yuen Wah, who worked on the original Mr. Vampire, replaced Lam and handled the action sequences as well. American actor Jack Scalia, who acted in the 1978 television series Dallas, was also recruited into the cast.

Initially Tanya Roberts from Charlie's Angels and Sheena: Queen of the Jungle was chosen but it did not work out so she was replaced by Michelle Phillips, a singer from the vocal group The Mamas & the Papas. They all flew out to Hong Kong to start filming at Golden Harvest studios. After several weeks filming was abandoned because Yuen Wah could not speak English very well. Raymond Chow pulled the plug, saying "we started but we need not finish". The Demon Hunters filmed footage still exists and is kept in Golden Harvest's archives.

Since the failed English version of Mr. Vampire Michelle Yeoh's company, Han Entertainment, is planning to do a similar movie.

=== Sequels ===
Highly successful at the time, both in Hong Kong and as a cult film favourite with overseas enthusiasts of Hong Kong cinema, It inspired numerous parodies and homage films. The film launched Lam Ching-ying's character, the unibrowed Taoist exorcist, whom he would portray not only in the Mr. Vampire sequels, but also in many other films, including unrelated ones.

Mr. Vampire sequels included Mr. Vampire II, Mr. Vampire III and Mr. Vampire IV. However, most do not relate to the first film, instead simply being set on the same themes. There is in fact only one canonical sequel, Ricky Lau's own Mr. Vampire 1992. Confusion regarding the sequels has been compounded not only by the names of the films but also by the fact that the films share some cast members, though often recast in different roles. There are also other films of the Chinese vampire genre starring Lam Ching-ying, such as Encounters of the Spooky Kind II (1990) and Magic Cop (1990), or directed by Lam himself, such as Vampire vs Vampire (1989), which are all separate from the Mr. Vampire franchise. In addition, Lam uses his real name for his character in some of the films he acted in.

A related television series titled Vampire Expert (殭屍道長) starring Lam Ching-ying was broadcast from 1996 to 1997. However, during the filming of the third season, Lam developed liver cancer and died before the project was completed. The first season of My Date with a Vampire, a television series produced by ATV, was specially dedicated to Lam, and the story was based on future events in Vampire Expert.

=== Theatrical play ===
Mr. Vampire was adapted into a theatrical play and was performed at the Cultural Centre's Studio Theatre in Hong Kong from 29 to 31 October 2010 as part of a Halloween theme and New Vision Arts Festival. Tang Lok-yin is the music director/composer for this play with Pun Siu-fai as the choreographer.

The inspiration for this play was that of the music directors in an interview he said that when he was a child he watch a lot of Lam Ching-Ying's movies with his younger brother. She also mentioned Lam had played a Taoist priest in the Mr. Vampire series and that is the inspiration behind the director's contemporary musical dance theatre. She also said she was sort of forced into watching the movies because her parents are big fans.

On the stage it is decorated with six coffins and a large moon on top, Mr. Vampire the play begins with the suicide of a grief-stricken woman. The play shows the audience the popular understanding of qi (breath) and the mythical consequences if it does not leave the body of a person who dies in grudge, The play then portray love and hate with the use of animalistic dancers alternating between kissing and biting each other. The show then transforms into a performance of similar to that of Michael Jackson's music videos Thriller and Beat It before turning into the rage of the grudging beings.

=== Video game ===
Mr. Vampire was made into a Japanese video game entitled Reigen Doushi (霊幻道士) it was published by Pony Canyon and certain scenes in the game were taken from the movie. The video game was released on Nintendo Entertainment System in Japan 16 September 1988 and in the United States 1 April 1990 under the title Phantom Fighter by the publisher FCI Inc and the Developer Marionette.

=== Merchandise ===
A number Japanese board games that relate to Mr. Vampire were released in Japan.

== Screenings ==
Mr. Vampire has been screened numerous times in since its release screening include:

- Hong Kong Film Archive (3 November 2012)
- Broadway Cinematheque (11 November 2012)
- Tokyo International Film Festival (20 October 2012)
- University of Bath
- University of Chicago

== Home media ==
=== VHS ===
Release date	Country	Classifaction	Publisher	Format	Language	Subtitles	Notes	REF
Unknown	United States	Unknown	Rainbow Audio and Video Incorporation	NTSC	Cantonese	English		
21 September 1988	Japan	Unknown	Pony Video	NTSC	Japanese (Dubbed)	None		
19 June 1998	United States	Unknown	Tai Seng Entertainment	NTSC	Cantonese	English		
19 October 1999	France	Unknown	HK Video	NTSC	Cantonese	English		
24 January 2000	United Kingdom	15	Made in Hong Kong	PAL	Cantonese	English		

=== Laserdisc ===
Release date	Country	Classifaction	Publisher	Catalog No	Format	Language	Subtitles	Notes	REF
1988	Japan	N/A	Pony Video LaserVision	G88F0112	CLV / NTSC	Cantonese	Japanese	Audio Mono	

=== VCD ===
Release date	Country	Classifaction	Publisher	Format	Language	Subtitles	Notes	REF
Unknown	Hong Kong	N/A	Megastar (HK)	NTSC	Cantonese	English, Chinese	2VCDs	
Unknown	Hong Kong	N/A	Deltamac (HK)	NTSC	Cantonese	English, Traditional Chinese	2VCDs	
5 December 2003	China	N/A	Jiang Xi Wen Hua Yin Xiang Chu Ban She	NTSC	Mandarin	English, Traditional Chinese	2VCDs	
7 October 2005	Taiwan	N/A	Xin Sheng Dai (TW)	NTSC	Mandarin	Traditional Chinese	2VCDs	
25 February 2009	Hong Kong	N/A	Joy Sales (HK)	NTSC	Cantonese	English, Traditional Chinese	2VCDs Digitally Remastered	

=== DVD ===
Release date	Country	Classifaction	Publisher	Format	Region	Language	Sound	Subtitles	Notes	REF
Unknown	Hong Kong	N/A	Deltamac (HK)	NTSC	ALL	Cantonese, Mandarin (Dubbed)	Dolby Digital 2.0	English, Traditional Chinese, Simplified Chinese		
2001	Hong Kong	N/A	Mega Star	NTSC	ALL	Cantonese, Mandarin (Dubbed)	Dolby Digital 5.1	Cantonese, English, Thai, Vietnamese, Spanish		
22 April 2002	United Kingdom	15	Hong Kong Legends	PAL	2	Cantonese, English (Dubbed)	Dolby Digital 5.1	English	Digitally Re-mastered	
19 February 2004	France	N/A	HK Video	PAL	2	Cantonese	Dolby Digital	French	Box-set	
7 September 2004	United States	PG-13	20th Century Fox	NTSC	1	Cantonese, English (Dubbed)	Dolby Digital 5.1	English	Digitally Re-mastered	
26 June 2005	Hong Kong	N/A	Joy Sales (HK)	NTSC	ALL	Cantonese, Mandarin (Dubbed)	Dolby Digital 5.1, DTS Digital Surround	English, Traditional Chinese, Simplified Chinese	Digitally Re-mastered	
5 December 2007	Australia/ New Zealand	M	Magna Pacific	PAL	4	Cantonese, English (Dubbed)	Dolby Digital 5.1	English	Digitally Re-mastered	
11 October 2007	Japan	N/A	Universal Pictures Japan	NTSC	2	Cantonese, Japanese (Dubbed)	Dolby Digital Mono	Japanese	Digitally Re-mastered Box-set	
8 July 2011	Japan	N/A	Paramount Home; Entertainment Japan	NTSC	2	Cantonese	Dolby Digital	Japanese	Digitally Re-mastered	
23 November 2011	United States	PG-13	20th Century Fox	NTSC	1	Cantonese, English (Dubbed)	Dolby Digital 5.1, DTS Digital Surround	English	Digitally Re-mastered	
15 October 2012	United Kingdom	15	Cine-Asia	PAL	2	Cantonese, English (Dubbed)	Dolby Digital 5.1	English	Digitally Re-mastered	
21 December 2012	Japan	N/A	Paramount Home; Entertainment Japan	NTSC	2	Cantonese, Japanese	Dolby Digital	Japanese	Digitally Re-mastered	

=== Blu-ray ===
Release date	Country	Classification	Publisher	Format	Region	Language	Sound	Subtitles	Notes	REF
21 December 2012	Japan	N/A	Paramount Home Entertainment, Japan	NTSC	A	Cantonese, Japanese		Japanese	Digitally Re-mastered	
20 July 2020	UK	BBFC 15	Eureka Entertainment	1080p	B	Cantonese, English (European dub), English (U.S. dub)	LPCM	English	Brand-new 2K restoration	

=== Online ===
Mr. Vampire was previously available on Netflix and Sky Player (now Sky Go).

== See also ==
- Zombie comedy
- Zombie film
