= In the Line of Duty 4: Witness =

1989 Hong Kong action film by Yuen Woo-ping

- Theatrical poster
- Traditional Chinese: 皇家師姐IV直擊証人
- Simplified Chinese: 皇家师姐IV直击证人
- Hanyu Pinyin: Huáng Jiā Shī Jiě Sì Zhí Jī Zhèng Rén
- Jyutping: Wong4 Gaa1 Si1 Ze2 Sei3 Zik6 Gik1 Zing3 Jan4
- Directed by: Yuen Woo-ping
- Written by: Anthony Wong; Cheung Chi-sing; Kim Yip
- Produced by: Stephen Shin
- Starring: Cynthia Khan; Michael Wong; Donnie Yen
- Cinematography: Ma Koon-wah; Au Kam-hung
- Edited by: D & B Film Editor Group
- Music by: Richard Yuen; Tang Siu-lam
- Production company: D & B Films Co., Ltd.
- Distributed by: D & B Films Co., Ltd.
- Release date: 21 July 1989
- Running time: 94 minutes
- Country: Hong Kong
- Language: Cantonese
- Box office: HK$12,100,193

In the Line of Duty 4: Witness (a.k.a. In the Line of Duty Part 4) is a 1989 Hong Kong action film directed by Yuen Woo-ping. The film stars Cynthia Khan, Michael Wong, and Donnie Yen. The film was released theatrically in Hong Kong on 21 July 1989.

The film is nominally part of the loosely connected In the Line of Duty and Yes, Madam! series. The alternative titles of this and other films in the series can be cause for confusion.

== Plot ==
Hong Kong international police officer Rachel Yeung Lai-ching go to the United States to investigate a drug trafficking case in Seattle with the local narcotics team leader, Tony. When they track down a local Chinese suspect, Liu Zai, they have already received news that Liu Zai has sneaked back to Hong Kong, so Yeung Lai-ching and Tony return to Hong Kong together. During the pursuit, they find that Liu Zai is constantly being chased and almost dies several times. Tony begins to think that Liu Zai is not just involved in the drug trafficking case. When Tony and Yeung Lai-ching continue to investigate, they find that the whole thing is actually related to the US Central Intelligence Agency 6, and Tony's colleague Michael, the leader of another group, is also involved. The truth of the incident is revealed layer by layer.

== Cast ==
- Cynthia Khan as Madam Rachel Yeung Lai-ching
- Michael Wong as Captain Michael Wong
- Donnie Yen as Captain Donnie Yan
- Yuen Yat-chor as Luk Wan-ting
- Lisa Chiao as Luk's mother
- Liu Kai-chi as Ming
- Paul Wong as Hospital Killer
- Fairlie Ruth Kordick as Blonde fighter
- Jim James as Officer John

== Reception ==
TV Guide said: "Although the action comes neatly packed, screenwriters Anthony Wong and Chueng Chi Shing fill the story with so many double crosses that it sometimes unravels under their weight."

== See also ==
- Donnie Yen filmography
- List of Hong Kong films of 1989
