= Angel Enforcers =

1989 Hong Kong film by Godfrey Ho

- Film poster
- Directed by: Godfrey Ho
- Written by: Edward Leung Yiu-Ming; Hank Lai
- Produced by: George Lai; Matthew Chan; Ted Ma; Sam Wang
- Starring: Pan Pan Yeung; Pauline Wong
- Cinematography: Raymond Chang
- Edited by: Vincent Leung
- Music by: Stephen Tsang
- Production company: Grandwell Film Productions
- Release date: 14 January 1989
- Running time: 94 minutes
- Country: Hong Kong
- Language: Cantonese

Angel Enforcers (pinyin: Wong ga fei fung) is a 1989 Hong Kong action film directed by Godfrey Ho and starring Pan Pan Yeung and Pauline Wong, in which female agents battle a gang of diamond thieves.
