= Devil Hunters =

1989 Hong Kong film by Tony Lo

- Film poster
- Traditional Chinese: 獵魔群英
- Simplified Chinese: 猎魔群英
- Hanyu Pinyin: Liè Mó Qún Yīng
- Jyutping: Lip6 Mo1 Kwan4 Jing1
- Directed by: Tony Lo
- Screenplay by: Tony Lo; Chan Man-kwai
- Produced by: Lee Yuk-hing
- Starring: Alex Man; Sibelle Hu; Moon Lee; Ray Lui
- Edited by: Cheung Keung
- Music by: Tang Siu-lam
- Production company: Jia's Motion Pictures (HK)
- Distributed by: Film Line Enterprises
- Release date: 10 August 1989
- Running time: 90 minutes
- Country: Hong Kong
- Language: Cantonese
- Box office: HK$$5,055,340

Devil Hunters is a 1989 Hong Kong action film written and directed by Tony Lo and starring Alex Man, Sibelle Hu, Moon Lee and Ray Lui. The film was released as Ultra Force 2 in the west as a sequel to the film, Killer Angels which was released a few months earlier as Ultra Force. Although both films were directed by Lo and starred Lee, Devil Hunters is unrelated to Killer Angels.

== Plot ==
At the Happy Dragon Recreation Park, Hong Kong's two notorious drug lords, Hon San (Wong Wai) and Chai Yan (Lau Siu-ming) leads their respective group of underlings carry out a huge drug trade. Police superintendent Tsang (Alex Man) leads chief inspector Tong Fung (Sibelle Hu), Man (Candy Wen) and other sergeants and laid a dragnet for a cleansweep of the two drug traffickers. However, during the drug trade, the ambush by the police was exposed by Chun Bing (Moon Lee), a master of multiple identities, and Chai Yuet (Ray Lui), a tough, ruthless fighter, both of whom engage in a fierce gun battle with the police. Hon believes the incident was a result of Chai betraying him and tipping the police. As a result, Hon's his right hand man, Chiu Sing (Francis Ng), to murder Chai, while Chai's son, Yuet, swears vengeance.

Hon's authority has been usurped by Chiu (Francis Ng), who forces Hon to hand him a large sum of gems from his estate when Chiu frames Hon for the murder of Chai. One of Hon's underlings, Wu Kin (Cheng Hong-yip), attempts to protect his boss but was killed by Chiu. Another one of Hong's underlings, Yin Fu (Michael Chan)'s family is being held hostage by Chiu, who forces him to betray Hon. Once Yin's family was released, he attempts to save Hon but was also killed by Chiu. However, before Yin died, he has informed the police about the case and the police sets up a special task force consists of Bing, who is Hon's daughter, Yuet and Tong to counter against Chiu. When Chiu attempts to take the gems from Hon's estate, he was surrounded by the police. After an intense battle, Hon was killed by Chiu, who in turn, was blown up in a LPG explosion.

== Cast ==
- Alex Man as Superintendent Tsang
- Sibelle Hu as Tong Fung
- Moon Lee as Chun Bing
- Ray Lui as Chai Yuet
- Candy Wen as Man
- Francis Ng as Chiu Sing
- Michael Chan as Yin Fu
- Wong Wai as Hon San
- Andy Tai as Ngai Yuen
- Ken Lo as Chai Biu
- Chan Pui-kei as Hon Suet
- Tong Kam-tong as Seung To
- Cheng Hong-yip as Wu KIn
- Lau Siu-ming as Chai Yan
- Lau Hung-fong
- Kellie Lam
- Kwan Kwok-chung
- Joe Chu as Policeman
- Frank Liu as Policeman
- Cheng Yuen-man
- Derek Kok
- Leung Ching
- Mak Wai-cheung
- James Ha
- Wan Seung-lam
- Lau Shung-fung
- Samo Ho
- Ridley Tsui
- Fan Chin-hung
- Choi Kwok-keung
- Hau Woon-ling
- Jack Wong
- Wong Man-sing
- Chang Sing-kwong
- Ma Yuk-sing
- Lung Sang
- Lee Yiu-king

== Production ==
During the filming of the film's final scene where cast members Sibelle Hu, Moon Lee and Ray Lui jumped out of an exploding building, a mishap occurred due to poor timing by pyrotechnics, causing Hu and Lee to be engulfed in flames and suffer third degree burns. The ending of the film featured a message praising the trio for their professionalism and also featured shots of newspaper reports of the incident as the credits roll.

== Reception ==
=== Critical ===
In the book, The Hong Kong Filmography, 1977–1997: A Reference Guide to 1,100 Films Produced by British Hong Kong Studios, John Charles gave the film a score of 6/10 and criticizes the under cranking but praises the choreography of the action scenes. Hong Kong Film Net gave the film a score of 7/10 and praises the film's stunt work while also noting the light expository scenes. Asian Film Strike gave the film a score of 2.5/5 praising the character, drama and action scenes, but criticizes its uninvolving plot and exploitative scenes.

=== Box office ===
The film grossed HK$$5,055,340 at the Hong Kong box office during its theatrical run from 10 to 23 August 1989.
