= Lost Command (1988 film) =

Filipino action film

- Directed by: Ben (M7) Yalung
- Screenplay by: Tony A. Calvento
- Story by: Ben (M7) Yalung
- Produced by: Horace (M2) Yalung; Romy (M3) Yalung
- Starring: Ramon 'Bong' Revilla Jr.; Paquito Diaz; Lala Montelibano; Jenny Lyn; Dave Brodett; Baldo Marro; Robert Talabis; Lolit Solis; King Gutierrez
- Cinematography: Ernesto 'Boy' Dominguez
- Edited by: Augusto 'Oggie' Salvador
- Music by: Jun Latonio
- Production company: Cine Suerte
- Distributed by: Cine Suerte (Philippines); Davian International (international)
- Release date: May 1988
- Country: Philippines
- Language: Filipino

Lost Command is a 1988 Filipino action film directed by Ben "M7" Yalung, written by Tony A. Calvento, and starring Ramon 'Bong' Revilla Jr., Paquito Diaz, Lala Montelibano, Jenny Lyn, Dave Brodett, Baldo Marro, Robert Talabis, Lolit Solis, King Gutierrez, E. R. Ejercito. Produced by Cine Suerte, the film was released in May 1988.

Critic Lav Diaz gave Lost Command a mildly positive review, expressing that the film largely worked as a vehicle for budding action star Revilla despite being hampered by overly poetic dialogue and incredulously bombastic action scenes. He also gave high praise to the "natural" performance of child actor Billy Crawford.

== Cast ==
- Ramon 'Bong' Revilla Jr. as Lt. Roland Briones
- Paquito Diaz as Major Mauro Mendez
- Lala Montelibano
- Jenny Lyn
- Dave Brodett
- Baldo Marro
- Robert Talabis
- Lolit Solis
- King Gutierrez
- E. R. Ejercito
- Edwin Reyes
- Ronnie Olivar
- Angel Samson
- Emil Martin
- Janet Bordon
- Jean Garcia
- Fred Montilla
- Ernie Zarate
- Pepito Guerrero
- Violy David
- Rene Yalung
- Chuckie Dreyfuss
- Rose Ann Gonzales
- Isabel Granada
- Christopher Paloma
- Marichelle Hipolito
- Robert Ortega
- Mary Grace David
- Apple Tiatco
- Heidi Paloma
- Brian Baylon
- Barry Baylon
- Billy Joe Crawford as David
- Genelyn Magsaysay

== Production ==
Actor Ronnie Ricketts, after starring in the film Target: Sparrow Unit, was originally included among the cast of Lost Command. However, due to a defamatory article he wrote for a magazine on November 20, 1987, about director Ben Yalung and writer Tony Calvento, he was dropped from the project.

Genelyn Magsaysay, an 18-year-old actress, met Bong Revilla's father and her soon-to-be partner Ramon Revilla Sr. during production of Lost Command, and later gave birth to Bong's half-sibling Ram Revilla.

== Release ==
Lost Command was released in May 1988.

=== Critical response ===
Lav Diaz, writing for the Manila Standard, gave the film a mildly positive review. He praised the improving acting ability of Bong Revilla, stating that the film's largest achievement is showing his maturation as an action star, while giving high acclaim to child actor Billy Crawford's performance ("He's too much of a natural"). However, Diaz criticized the film's overly poetic dialogue, sappy ending, and far-fetched action scenes, the latter for being too bombastic to be believable ("Thus, you would think that this is now a Watari or Star Wars type of film").

== Accolades ==
Group	Category	Name	Result
FAMAS Awards	Best Child Actress	Rose Ann Gonzales	Nominated
FAMAS Awards	Best Song	Song by Jun Latonio	Nominated
