= Target: Maganto =

1988 action film starring Ronnie Ricketts

- Directed by: Leonardo L. Garcia
- Written by: Erwin T. Lanado
- Produced by: Greg V. Magliba
- Starring: Ronnie Ricketts; Charlie Davao; Monica Herrera; Paquito Diaz; Romy Diaz; Nick Romano; Renato del Prado; Bing Davao; Aurora Salve
- Cinematography: Val Daus
- Edited by: Francisco J. Vinarao
- Music by: Rey Ramos
- Production company: GVM Productions
- Release date: April 8, 1988
- Running time: 108 minutes
- Country: Philippines
- Language: Filipino

Target: Maganto is a 1988 Filipino action film based on the life of Lt. Col. Romeo Maganto of the Western Police District in Manila. Directed by Leonardo L. Garcia, the film stars Ronnie Ricketts as the eponymous police commander, alongside Charlie Davao, Monica Herrera, Paquito Diaz, Romy Diaz, Nick Romano, Renato del Prado, Bing Davao and Aurora Salve. It is the first film to be made about Maganto's life; later films include Leon ng Maynila (1991) and The Legend: Tomagan (2003). Produced by GVM Productions, the film was released on April 8, 1988.

== Plot ==
Lt. Col. Romeo Maganto is a dedicated police commander of the Western Police District. His repeated raids against a syndicate's operations eventually lead to a confrontation between him and the Sparrow Unit led by Archie.

== Cast ==
- Ronnie Ricketts as Lt. Col. Romeo S. Maganto
- Monica Herrera as Elaine, Romeo's wife
- Aurora Salve as Doctor Lendel
- Paquito Diaz as Archibald "Archie"
- Romy Diaz as Sgt. Dimayuga
- Angelo Ventura as Commissioner
- Nick Romano as Sgt. Torres
- Renato del Prado as Ka Nato
- Bing Davao as Ka Bing
- Charlie Davao as Gonzales
- Eddie Nicart as hired killer
- Bryan Baylon
- Rey Sagum as dagul holdaper
- Danny Riel/Real as police sergeant
- Efren Lapid as Ka Efren
- Tony Martinez as Cristobal
- Usman Hasim as member of the NPA
- Jun de Guia as a goon
- Robert Talby
- Robert Miller as member of the NPA
- Vic Santos as policeman
- Turko Montero as policeman
- Emil Estrada as policeman
- Eddie Gigoso as a goon
- Pons de Guzman as lawyer
- Joe Baltazar as a goon
- Bebing Amora as member of the NPA
- Leo Lazaro as member of the NPA
- Jess Bernardo as policeman
- Boy Ranai as a goon
- Sarah Aguilar as member of the NPA
- Amor Siron as member of the NPA
- Mary Ann Arenas as member of the NPA
- Marites Pariño
- Alex Flores
- Nemie Gutierrez
- Buddy Salvador
- Brando Magliba as member of the NPA
- Celso V. Magliba as a policeman
- Frank Lapid as a goon

== Release ==
Target: Maganto was graded "C" by the Movie and Television Review and Classification Board (MTRCB), indicating a "Fair" quality. The film was released in theaters on April 8, 1988.

=== Critical response ===
Lav Diaz, writing for the Manila Standard, gave Maganto a negative review. He criticized the film's highly fictionalized portrayal of the Sparrow Unit, focusing especially on the fictional character of Archie, as he thought that there were enough material written about them in newspapers for the filmmakers to have a more accurate depiction of the group. Diaz was also critical of the actors' performances, singling out in particular Ronnie Ricketts and Monica Herrera's portrayal of a married couple with three children being contradicted by their performances, which are that of lovers just starting to know each other.

== See also ==
Other depictions of the Sparrow Unit in film:

- Target: Sparrow Unit (1987), also starring Ronnie Ricketts
- Ambush (1988), also starring Ronnie Ricketts
- Patrolman (1988)
- Alex Boncayao Brigade (1989), also starring Ronnie Ricketts
