= Aurora Sevilla =

Filipina television and film actress, Beauty Queen Titleholder, and Model

- Born: Aurora Elvira Gayoso Sevilla; October 26, 1963 (age 61); Philippines
- Occupation(s): Actress, model
- Years active: 1984–present

Aurora Elvira Gayoso Sevilla is a Filipino former actress and beauty pageant titleholder. She was crowned as Mutya Ng Pilipinas - World 1984. She represented the Philippines in the Miss World 1984 pageant in London.

Sevilla was also named Ms. Press Photography the year before. Just like other beauty titlists, Sevilla entered showbiz after her reign. Her beauty queen status eventually served as her ticket to show business where she appeared as a leading lady in various local action films.

== Career ==
Sevilla first gained public attention in 1984 after she was crowned Mutya ng Pilipinas.

Sevilla was introduced in the film Okleng Tokleng (1986) and then she joined a cast for a new project of RPN and ABS-CBN in the TV series Agila (1987-1992). She would star in several movies opposite the most popular action stars like Dante Varona in Bangkay Mo Akong Hahakbangin (1986) and Kamandag ng Kris (1987), Sonny Parsons in Shoot to Kill: Boy Bicol ng Angeles (1988), Bong Revilla in Chinatown: Sa Kuko ng Dragon (1988), Ronnie Ricketts in Tatak ng Isang Api (1989), Jestoni Alarcon in Walang Panginoon (1989), Jess Lapid Jr. in Bawat Patak... Dugong Pilipino (1989), and Phillip Salvador in Joe Pring: Homicide Manila Police (1989).

In 1990s, she also appeared as leading lady of Eddie Garcia in Sgt. Patalinhug: CIS Special Operations Group (1990), Ramon Revilla in David Balondo ng Tondo (1990), Lito Lapid in Karapatan Ko ang Pumatay... Kapitan Guti (1990), Efren Reyes, Jr. in Tapos Na ang Lahi Mo ... Hadji Djakiri (1990), John Regala in Totoy Buwang (1992), Ace Vergel in Totoy Guwapo: Alyas Kanto Boy (1992), and Robin Padilla in Manila Boy (1993).

In 2009, after she was featured in Wish Ko Lang, GMA Network was included her in the cast of TV series Kung Aagawin Mo Ang Lahat Sa Akin starring Maxene Magalona and Glaiza de Castro. In 2019, she joined for her new project of ABS-CBN in the TV series The Killer Bride starring Maja Salvador, Janella Salvador, Geoff Eigenmann and Joshua Garcia.

== Personal life ==
She was just in grade three, when her father Col. Arturo Sevilla of the Philippine Air Force died. She managed to finish Bachelor of Science in Public Relations at Saint Paul College.

With her film earnings, Sevilla also ventured into some businesses, but her luck would soon run out. She is a single parent to Joshua and Ali.

Sevilla was arrested on December 3, 2009, while in the act of selling a gram of shabu worth P1,000 to a buyer in Mandaluyong.

== Filmography ==
=== Film ===
- Okleng Tokleng (1986)
- Bangkay Mo Akong Hahakbangin (1986)
- Kamandag ng Kris (1987)
- Ultimatum: Ceasefire! (1987)
- Shoot To Kill: Boy Bicol ng Angeles (1988)
- Chinatown: Sa Kuko ng Dragon (1988)
- Walang Panginoon (1989)
- Tatak ng Isang Api (1989)
- Moises Platon (1989)
- Bawat Patak... Dugong Pilipino (1989)
- Si Aida, si Lorna, o si Fe (1989)
- Joe Pring: Homicide, Manila Police (1989)
- Irosin: Pagputok ng Araw, Babaha ng Dugo (1989)
- Sgt. Patalinhug: CIS Special Operations Group (1990)
- David Balondo ng Tondo (1990)
- Karapatan Ko ang Pumatay! -Kapitan Guti (1990)
- Tapos Na ang Lahi Mo... Hadji Djakiri (1990)
- Walang Sinasanto ang Bala Ko (1990)
- Kidlat ng Maynila: Joe Pring 2 (1991)
- Sgt. Ernesto Baliola: Tinik sa Batas (1992)
- Totoy Buang: Mad Killer ng Maynila (1992)
- Basagulero (1992)
- Totoy Guwapo: Alyas Kanto Boy (1992)
- Manila Boy (1993)
- Kumander Kalbo (1994)
- Jacob (1997)
- Expensive Candy (2022)
- Nagalit ang Patay sa Haba ng Lamay: Da Resbak (2023)

=== Television ===
- Agila (1987–1992) – Liweng
- Kung Aagawin Mo ang Lahat sa Akin (2009) – Rosita Aguirre
- The Killer Bride (2019) – Guada P. Dela Torre
- Maalaala Mo Kaya: Tattoo (2021) – Bining
- Maalaala Mo Kaya: Silver Medal (2022) – Lola

== See also ==
- Binibining Pilipinas
- Miss World Philippines
- Philippines at major beauty pageants
