= Controversies and criticisms of The Voice of the Philippines =

The Voice of the Philippines is the Philippine version of The Voice, a reality singing competition that currently airs on ABS-CBN. The first season began airing on June 15, 2013, and ended on September 29, 2013. It is hosted by Toni Gonzaga along with Alex Gonzaga and Robi Domingo as the show's backstage hosts and social media correspondents. The judging panel is composed of Bamboo Mañalac, Sarah Geronimo, Lea Salonga, and apl.de.ap.

Like its other international counterparts, the show had drawn numerous controversies and criticisms — both positive and negative.

== First season ==
=== Pilot week responses ===
During the pilot episode, the show received fairly negative reviews from the viewers emphasizing the design of the infamous red chairs, and set. The show was also observed having longer commercial loads ending up to a huge gaps per show. The coaches' opening performance was also deemed unrehearsed. Pooled reviews from novices of the franchise stated that the coaches were found to be a bit exaggerated on television. Avid fanatics of the franchise however explained that certain aspects of the said coaches can also be seen across franchises. Ms. Lea Salonga together with her fellow coaches were even bashed on Twitter. On an article written by Joey Aquino of The People's Journal on June 21, 2013, Aquino commented that Salonga has already gave much prestige to the country and with the bashing that had happened on Twitter, Salonga deserves much respect that she is entitled.

On an article written by Nickie Wang of the Manila Standard Today, Wang wrote, "the famous revolving chairs installed do not offer the same appeal as compared to its American or Dutch counterpart. The studio looks cheap in other words. ABS-CBN can take inspiration from our neighbors in Thailand and Vietnam who were more detailed on their performance venue when they staged the same show. As far as the first episode is concerned, The Voice didn't seem to get the buy in of the viewers. Though they have the luxury to delegate which auditionees should appear on the first episodes, the program fell short in producing a grand debut, which more often than not would determine the route it’s going to take in its next episodes." However, he gave a positive review of the coaches and wrote, "The only consolation in this show is that the set of judges-cum-mentors is definitely an upgrade from the set of singers that served as the panel in X-Factor. Even the inclusion of the youngest mentor Sarah Geronimo was not a bad idea at all as the singer seems to know what she’s talking about. While Bamboo’s subtlety defines his character as a judge and musician, Lea Salonga and apl.de.ap can tone down a little as they often look off and distracting whenever they do their over-the-top gestures."

Despite having a lot of negative reviews from the viewers, there were also who praised the show just like the artists who were invited for the Blind auditions, and the quality and credibility of the line-up of the coaches. On a review published by Philippine Entertainment Portal (PEP) on June 19, 2013, PEP gave 5 things what the viewers should see more from the show. First, Geronimo should have more confidence with herself. PEP noted that Geronimo has a tendency to act like a fan girl, making her more younger and perhaps less authoritative coach. This was noted as pity staunch for Geronimo, knowing that she actually provides sound and practical advice to the invited artists for the Blind auditions. Second, apl.de.ap should give more inspiring stories of himself, especially with his pre-Black Eyed Peas days. Third, Salonga should give more fun moments in order to make the show more lively like when she drops her funny and bold antics. Fourth, Bamboo should have more charming quips. And lastly, more 4 chair turns.

Another positive review came from Kane Errol Choa of The Philippine Star who had interviewed and compiled different reviews from other people. One was from a freelance writer named Carline Reyes who had provided a positive review of Salonga who has been bashed on Twitter. “To some people she’s OA, but if you’re the contestant, it would mean a lot to see the coaches enjoying the short time you were onstage, especially because it’s not only their comments on your performance that are important, but also how they felt while you were performing. Plus, the fact that it’s Lea Salonga.” Reyes also gave a positive review for apl.de.Ap and she said, “In selling himself, apl makes sure that he doesn't just give artists opportunities and possibilities to enhance their talent, but he lets them know that he understands where they are coming from as well. It’s important for a coach to understand that because it’s the contestants’ aspirations that made them join The Voice, and will motivate them to win.” She had also made a review of Geronimo saying that, “Sarah is very keen in selecting her team members. Hindi basta-basta. She seems to be looking for the full vocal package. She’s optimistic and sincere in wooing the artist she wants to belong in her team.” She also didn't forgot about Bamboo and provided him a review as well, “I think he’s looking for soul and depth. A technically flawless vocal doesn’t seem to win him over. He’s looking for certain kinds of artists; he’s picky, and that’s understandable.”

=== Favoritism issues ===
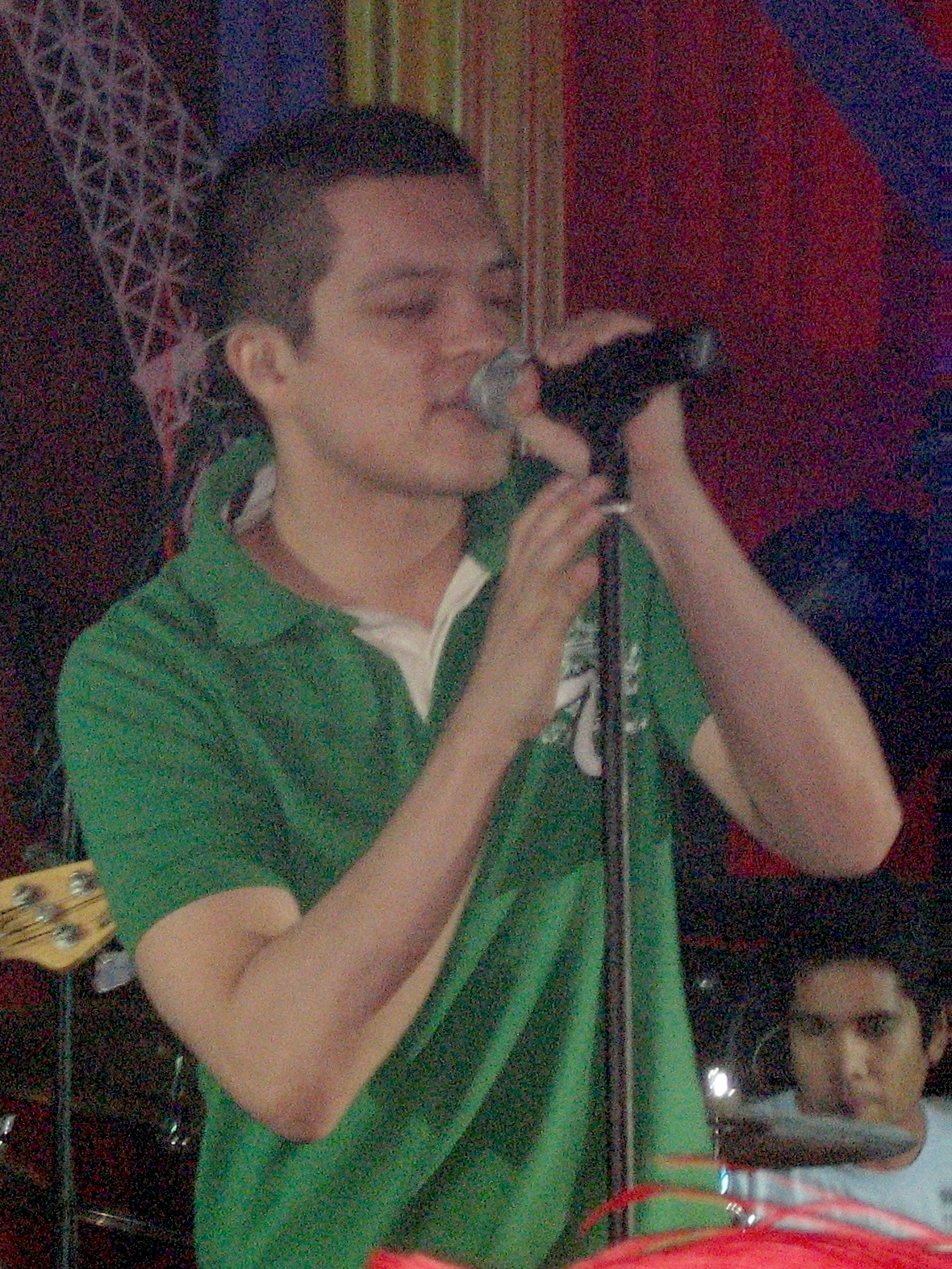
Bamboo Mañalac was criticized by the netizens for his favoritism over Lee Grane Maranan.

Bamboo Mañalac received many negative comments after the season one's first episode of the Battles aired on July 28, 2013, after he made a controversial choice on picking Lee Grane Maranan over Dan Billano. The two performed the ballad song "One" by U2, wherein Maranan was vocally outperformed by Billano. Billano was even praised by Joey Ayala, Mañalac's guest adviser during the Battles, and that according to him Billano was the clear winner of that Team Bamboo's first vocal battle. Billano was also praised by apl.de.ap; while Maranan was praised by Lea Salonga for her emotional delivery of the song. Mañalac's choice of letting Maranan win over Billano was based on the former's soulfulness and emotions rather than basing the result on the two's vocal performances, which caused rave of negative comments from the netizens. Maranan was a crowd favorite during the Blind auditions. Maranan undeniably admitted her loss over Billano but he thanked her coach for picking her and later added a promise that she will do better in the next round of the competition.

Later, on July 29, 2013, Mañalac made a statement in his official Facebook account saying, "I believe in Dan. If I remember correctly I was the only one who turned [for him]. I heard something special in Dan and [the] last nights performance, he proved me right. He shined. I was so happy for him. And hated, HATED to make that decision. But Lee, Lee has a story to tell. I just feel that I have to give her that chance. She has an artists soul. She was lost and all she needed was to find a bit of light. I know Lee, her strengths and weaknesses. I pushed Lee, put her in a situation where I knew was difficult. But I’m always a believer of adversity, to be tested, GROWTH over prize, and in defeats we grow stronger. Lee lost that “battle” but she deserves to move on, be heard. I could have easily changed the key for Lee to make it easier on her but I didn’t. I wanted to hear Lee." He added, "This battle wasn’t about Lee vs Dan. It was Lee vs Lee, Dan vs Dan. I will continue to sit on my chair and continue to make these hard decisions. But know this, I am committed to my artists... my team a 100%. The lights go off, and I’m still there. I’m no longer Dans “coach” but if he’ll have me as a friend and mentor to guide him, I will try my best to get Dans story told. It just wasn’t his time. I know Dan and all he needs is a guide. Let me be that guide. Be positive, let's support both artists ..."

Mañalac again received negative feedback with his choice after he picked Paolo Onesa over the Cordovales Father & Son duo during the third episode of the Battles aired on August 4, 2013. However, he insisted that he does not play favoritism in choosing his team in the show. "Like I always say, people are confusing you as a judge as a coach. I always say I am a coach first. It’s about making an artistic connection with someone. It’s about having an artistic connection with someone. Importante iyon, hindi puwedeng black and white lang," he said. "I spend a lot of time with my guys, I love my team. I’ll fight for all 13. Yes, may hard choice kami kaya nga mahirap eh. You put both singers in a position na they’ll both shine. At the end of the day, ang goal ko lang naman is pareho silang lumipad. To get to a decision, iba na iyon. It’s a tough thing to do. Pero again, coach first ako. I have to say, the 13 artists I have on my team, I will continue to coach them. It does not end there for them. That’s why I’m on this show," he added. In an interview made by ABS-CBN News Channel's Headstart on August 9, 2013, Mañalac gave his statements about his choices in The Voice of the Philippines. He reiterated that he is a coach first before being a judge of the show. "The choice between Willy and Paolo, again, I'm looking for the voice, someone... with a versatile voice who I can sort of train. I think it's easier to teach than to correct, that's my thing," he explained. "I just thought he did a great job," he added, referring to Paolo. "I think the boys, they performed better but I think the tone, the richness of the voice, the honey, the glint in the eye, I think Paolo had that. That's what I love about the show, everyone got to express [his or her] opinion. Social media is part of the show. It's awesome that they get to express their opinion." He furthered said that, he did not flinch with the netizens reaction over the social media.

== Second season ==
=== Spoiler issues ===
Several users from Facebook and Twitter were blocked by the social management team of the show after several spoilers of The Battles' winners were posted online. This incident made Salonga furious and disappointed with the incident.

=== Joniver Robles' departure from the show ===
After the last episode of the Knockouts that aired on January 19, 2015, Mañalac announced that Joniver Robles it was replaced by Rita Martinez after the former decided to withdraw from the show due to his personal reasons. However, in a post of Robles via his Facebook account, he stressed that he never knew about his status until he saw the episode. Due to this, much speculation has arisen online regarding Robles' removal from the show. On the other hand, Salonga was asked regarding the issue but decided to not comment regarding it. She further stated that she was not the proper person to be asked since it was not her team that was being involved.
