= Raider Platoon =

1988 action film directed by Francis "Jhun" Posadas

- Directed by: Francis "Jhun" Posadas
- Starring: Jess Lapid Jr.; Philip Gamboa
- Cinematography: Zosimo Corpus; Edmund Cupcupin
- Edited by: Monico Conrado
- Production company: Ticar Films
- Release date: July 7, 1988
- Country: Philippines

Raider Platoon is a 1988 Filipino action film directed by Francis "Jhun" Posadas and starring Jess Lapid Jr., Philip Gamboa, Amanda Amores, Lezette Cordero, and Ernie Ortega. Produced by Ticar Films, it is about a group of Filipino marines who face off against Moro outlaws on an island in Mindanao. The film was released in theaters on July 7, 1988.

Critic Lav Diaz gave Raider Platoon a negative review, criticizing its shallow depiction of soldiers and its wasted opportunity to take advantage of available resources given by the military.

== Plot ==
A group of marines in the Philippines prepare themselves for an amphibious raid against a group of Moro outlaws on Patian island in Mindanao.

== Cast ==
- Jess Lapid Jr.
- Philip Gamboa
- Amanda Amores
- Lezette Cordero
- Ernie Ortega

== Release ==
Raider Platoon was rated "C" by the Movie and Television Review and Classification Board (MTRCB), indicating a "Fair" quality, and was released on July 7, 1988.

=== Critical response ===
Lav Diaz, writing for the Manila Standard gave Raider Platoon a negative review, largely blaming the support given by the military as the source of its issues. Alongside the film's technical deficiencies, Diaz criticized the filmmakers' wasted opportunity to make a good film out of the resources they have, citing its shallow understanding of why soldiers choose to be soldiers other than for their duty to country, as well as the societal issues the film fails to give insight to.
