= Stomach In, Chest Out =

- Directed by: Junn P. Cabreira
- Written by: Junn P. Cabreira; Tony Calvento
- Produced by: Horace (M2) Yalung; Romy (M3) Yalung
- Starring: Eddie Garcia; Joey Marquez; Lara Melissa de Leon; Janice Jurado; Debraliz Valasote; Dexter Doria; Monica Herrera
- Cinematography: Rudy Diño
- Edited by: Segundo Ramos
- Music by: Demet Velasquez
- Production companies: Cine Suerte; EG Productions
- Distributed by: Cine Suerte
- Release date: August 11, 1988
- Running time: 108 minutes
- Country: Philippines
- Language: Filipino

Stomach In, Chest Out is a 1988 Filipino comedy film co-written and directed by Junn P. Cabreira. The film stars Eddie Garcia, Joey Marquez, Lara Melissa de Leon, Mercy Dizon, Debraliz, Daphie Garcia, Beth Yalung, Dexter Doria, and Monica Herrera. Produced by Cine Suerte and EG Productions, the film was released on August 11, 1988. Critic Lav Diaz gave the film a mildly positive review for being different from the usual type of Filipino comedy films.

== Plot ==
Four girls leave their pampered lives due to some missteps (both intentional and unintentional) and enlist themselves into the military, where they are trained by two leering officers.

== Cast ==
- Eddie Garcia as Kapitan Katakutan (lit. 'Captain Fear')
- Joey Marquez as Sarhento (lit. 'Sergeant')
- Lara Melissa de Leon
- Mercy Dizon
- Debraliz
- Daphie Garcia
- Beth Yalung
- Dexter Doria
- Monica Herrera
- Janice Jurado as Kapitan Katakutan's wife
- Arsenio Bautista
- Rudy Mayer
- Rochelle Alfaro
- Emil Cabanlig

== Release ==
Stomach In, Chest Out was graded "B" by the Movie and Television Review and Classification Board (MTRCB), indicating a "Good" quality, and was released in theaters on August 11, 1988. It was a box office bomb.

=== Critical response ===
Lav Diaz, writing for the Manila Standard, gave the film a mildly positive review, deeming it an okay comedy which was saved by being different from other Filipino comedies that feature "dancing, singing, kidding around of loveteams, and zombies." He also described the relationship between Kapitan and Sarhento as similar to that of the animated characters Sylvester and Tweety. However, Meg Mendoza, also from the Manila Standard, stated that she considered both this film and Bobocop to be "two of the worst movies this year."
