= Sgt. Ernesto Baliola: Tinik sa Batas =

1992 action film starring Sonny Parsons

- Directed by: Ricardo "Bebong" Osorio
- Screenplay by: Amado Laquesta
- Story by: Johnny Ramirez
- Produced by: Wally Chua; Victor Villegas
- Starring: Sonny Parsons
- Cinematography: Val Dauz
- Edited by: Renato de Leon
- Music by: Demet Velasquez
- Production company: Moviestars Production
- Distributed by: Moviestars Production
- Release date: June 17, 1992
- Running time: 93 minutes
- Country: Philippines
- Language: Filipino

Sgt. Ernesto Baliola: Tinik sa Batas (lit. Thorn in the Law) is a 1992 Philippine action film directed by Ricardo "Bebong" Osorio. The film stars Sonny Parsons as the title role. Based on true events, the film is about a sergeant based in Quezon City who begins engaging in Robin Hood-like criminal activities against law enforcement in order to help the slum area dwellers.

Critic Justino Dormiendo of the Manila Standard severely criticized the film for its overall crudeness, stating that it ""doesn't make sense in all aspects, including writing [...], directing [...], and acting."

== Cast ==
- Sonny Parsons as Sgt. Ernesto Baliola
- Efren Reyes as Atty. Petaga
- Aurora Sevilla as Soling
- Dindo Arroyo as Chief Goon
- Shirley Tesoro as Rowena
- Eric Francisco as Eric
- Oliver Osorio as Peping
- Gilda Aragon as Susan
- Fred Moro as Domeng
- Joey Padilla as P./Major
- Fernando "Chinkee" Tan as Lucio
- Melissa Sosa as Letty
- Martin Parsons as Jojo
- Ricardo Osorio as Col. Cruz
- Ros Olgado as Atty. Torrente
- Leo Padilla as Erning's Goon
- Boy Padilla as Erning's Goon
- Gilbert Caprecho as Erning's Goon
- Bebeng Amora as Erning's Goon
- Art Veloso as Policeman

== Release ==
=== Critical response ===
Justino Dormiendo of the Manila Standard gave the film a negative review for its crudeness, writing that it "doesn't make sense in all aspects, including writing [...], directing [...], and acting (if this is what Parsons and company wrongly consider their profession)." Dormiendo added that he was "particularly appalled at the sight of Parsons making a mockery of himself, women, and the character he is portraying.
