= Sa Dulo ng Baril =

1988 historical action film starring Jess Lapid Jr.

- Directed by: Jerry O. Tirazona
- Written by: Jerry O. Tirazona
- Starring: Jess Lapid Jr.; Lito Lazaro; Eric Borbon; Marithez Samson; Nick Romano; Danny Riel; Ronald Nepomuceno
- Edited by: Pat Ramos
- Music by: Gabby Castellano
- Production company: Super Nine Films International
- Release date: August 5, 1988
- Country: Philippines
- Language: Filipino

Sa Dulo ng Baril (lit. 'At Gun's End') is a 1988 Filipino historical action drama film written and directed by Jerry O. Tirazona and starring Jess Lapid Jr., Lito Lazaro, Eric Borbon, Marithez Samson, Nick Romano, Danny Riel, and Ronald Nepomuceno. Produced by Super Nine Films International, the film was released on August 5, 1988. Critic Lav Diaz gave the film a negative review, criticizing its pretentious editing and questionable depiction of communist rebels in the early 1970s.

== Cast ==
- Jess Lapid Jr. as Arnel, a social democratic activist
- Lito Lazaro
- Eric Borbon
- Marithez Samson
- Nick Romano
- Danny Riel
- Ronald Nepomuceno
- Maita Sanchez
- Robert Talby
- Robert Miller
- Nonong de Andres
- Pong de Guzman
- Joe Baltazar

== Release ==
Sa Dulo ng Baril was graded "C" by the Movie and Television Review and Classification Board (MTRCB), indicating a "Fair" quality, and was released in the Philippines on August 5, 1988.

=== Critical response ===
Lav Diaz, writing for the Manila Standard, gave Sa Dulo ng Baril a negative review, criticizing the film as pretentious for its cutaways to things such as flowers and the sea, despite nearly liking the simplicity of its storytelling. He also questioned the film's depiction of rebel communists as a rigid and severe group, for during the early 1970s the rebels would have been more concerned with widening its base than punishing wayward citizens within its controlled territory. Diaz also noted that many viewers were disappointed with the film due to expecting an action-packed story, when instead they were given "an orientation of the problems affecting our society".
