= Alex Boncayao Brigade (film) =

1989 action film by Joey Del Rosario and starring Ronnie Ricketts

- Official movie poster
- Directed by: Joey del Rosario
- Written by: Tony A. Calvento
- Produced by: Ricky Salonga
- Starring: Ronnie Ricketts; Mia Prats; George Estregan Jr.; Marco Polo; Richard Bonnin
- Cinematography: Bhal Dauz
- Edited by: Augusto Salvador
- Music by: Vehnee Saturno
- Production company: Olympia Pictures
- Distributed by: Olympia Pictures
- Release date: January 18, 1989
- Country: Philippines
- Language: Filipino

Alex Boncayao Brigade is a 1989 action film directed by Joey del Rosario. The film stars Ronnie Ricketts, Mia Prats, George Estregan Jr., Richard Bonnin and Marco Polo, alongside Dave Brodett, Val Iglesias, Nick Romano, Bomber Moran, and Dexter Doria. It is about the titular communist militant group (otherwise known as the Sparrow Unit) that functions as the urban guerrilla unit of the New People's Army. Produced by Olympia Pictures, the film was released on January 18, 1989.

== Cast ==
- Ronnie Ricketts as Romy
- Mia Prats as Dolores
- George Estregan Jr. as Rudy
- Marco Polo as Ricky
- Richard Bonnin as Leo
- Dave Brodett as Lt. Cordero
- Val Iglesias as Sgt. Padilla
- Nick Romano as Roberto
- Bomber Moran as Slim
- Dexter Doria as Fe
- Emil Estrada as Pfc. Salcedo
- Eddie del Mar Jr. as Pfc. Abad
- Lucita Soriano as Ka Rosa
- Dante Abadeza as Carding
- Mayleen Gonzales as Celina
- Jumbo Montelibano as a rebel
- Andy Oba as a rebel
- Danny Estrella as a rebel
- Philip Gamboa as Col. Ramos
- Rodolfo 'Boy' Garcia as Maj. Francisco
- Zandro Zamora as Col. Espiritu
- Teri Robles as news caster
- Vic Varrion as Col. Medina
- Renato del Prado as a detective
- Rene Hawkins as Itoy
- Nello Nayo as Atty. Juan Sevilla
- Becky Misa as Mrs. Gonzales
- Cris Daluz as Cristino
- Nonoy de Guzman as driver of Col. Espiritu
- Eddie Tuazon as Patis
- Tony Bagyo as a detective
- Omay Rivera as a detective

== Release ==
Alex Boncayao Brigade was released on January 18, 1989.

=== Critical response ===
Lav Diaz, writing for the Manila Standard, considered the film to be "nothing extraordinary", with a standard "Ka" (communist) story and ordinary, albeit numerous, action scenes. He criticized, however, the "corny" speech towards the end of the film.

== See also ==
Other depictions of the Alex Boncayao Brigade (Sparrow Unit) in film:

- Target: Sparrow Unit (1987) - also written by Tony Calvento and starring Ronnie Ricketts
- Target: Maganto (1988) - also starring Ronnie Ricketts
- Ambush (1988) - also starring Ronnie Ricketts
- Patrolman (1988)
