= Tony Calvento =

Filipino journalist and columnist

- Born: Antonio A. Calvento; February 1, 1954; Philippines
- Died: October 9, 2017 (aged 63); Muntinlupa, Philippines
- Occupations: TV host, radio host, columnist,
- Years active: 1977–2017
- Spouse: Carmen de la Rosa
- Children: 3

Antonio Alberto Calvento (February 1, 1954 – October 9, 2017) was a prominent Filipino broadcast journalist and columnist. He was the host of Calvento Files, a crime and investigative documentary show which aired on ABS-CBN (together with ABS-CBN News and Current Affairs) from 1995 to 1998.

== Personal life ==
Calvento was married to Carmen de la Rosa with three children.

== Death ==
Calvento died of stage 4 pancreatic cancer on October 9, 2017, at the Asian Hospital and Medical Center at the age of 63.

== Filmography ==
=== Screenplay ===
| Year | Title |
|---|---|
| 1983 | The Gunfighter |
| 1984 | Sigaw ng Katarungan |
| 1984 | Basag ang Pula |
| 1984 | Kumander Cobra |
| 1985 | Ulo ng Gapo |
| 1985 | Perfumed Garden |
| 1985 | Partida |
| 1986 | Cordillera |
| 1987 | Amanda |
| 1987 | Target: Sparrow Unit |
| 1987 | Anak ni Zuma |
| 1988 | Lost Command |
| 1988 | Stomach In, Chest Out |
| 1989 | Alex Boncayao Brigade |
| 1989 | Moises Platon |
| 1995 | Anabelle Huggins Story: Ruben Ablaza Tragedy - Mea Culpa |
| 1995 | The Lilian Velez Story: Till Death Do Us Part |
| 1995 | Jessica Alfaro Story |
| 1997 | Calvento Files: The Movie |
| 1997 | Boy Chico: Hulihin si Ben Tumbling |

=== Story ===
| Year | Title |
|---|---|
| 1987 | Amanda |

=== Advertising and Promotions Manager ===
| Year | Title |
|---|---|
| 1985 | Zuma |
| 1985 | Isa-Isa Lang |
| 1988 | Kumander Dante |

=== Advertising Manager ===
| Year | Title |
|---|---|
| 1988 | Moises Platon |

=== Production manager ===
| Year | Title |
|---|---|
| 1981 | Pepeng Shotgun |
| 1988 | Moises Platon |
| 1989 | Alex Boncayao Brigade |

=== Actor ===
| Title | Role | Year |
|---|---|---|
| Calvento Files: The Movie | Himself/Judge (segment "Balintuwad") | 1997 |

=== TV show ===
| Year | Title | Role | Network |
|---|---|---|---|
| 1994-1995 | Tony Calvento's TV Hotline | Host | ABC |
| 1995-1998 | Calvento Files | Host | ABS-CBN |

=== Radio show producer ===
| Year | Title | Station |
|---|---|---|
| 2005 | Hustisya para sa Lahat | DWIZ 882 kHz |
| 2011 | Pari Ko | DWIZ 882 kHz |

== Awards, honors and recognition ==
- Golden Scroll for Journalism
