= Ambush (1988 film) =

1988 action film by Francis "Jun" Posadas; starring Ronnie Ricketts

- Directed by: Francis "Jun" Posadas
- Screenplay by: Jerry O. Tirazona
- Story by: Raffy Quizon
- Produced by: Betty Catog (executive producer)
- Starring: Ronnie Ricketts
- Cinematography: Ver Dauz
- Edited by: Nap Montebon
- Music by: Rey Valera
- Production company: Regent Films
- Release date: July 13, 1988
- Running time: 123 minutes
- Country: Philippines
- Language: Filipino

Ambush is a 1988 Filipino action film directed by Francis "Jun" Posadas and written by Jerry O. Tirazona. Starring Ronnie Ricketts, Dick Israel, Sonny Parsons, E.R. Ejercito, Leo Lazaro, Bobby Zshornack, and Beverly Vergel, the story follows an armed struggle between the New People's Army's Sparrow Unit and the Armed Forces of the Philippines.

Produced by Regent Films, the film was theatrically released on July 13, 1988.

== Cast ==
- Ronnie Ricketts as Ka Mario
- Dick Israel as Ka Diego
- Sonny Parsons
- E.R. Ejercito
- Leo Lazaro
- Bobby Zshornack
- Beverly Vergel
- Raoul Aragonn
- Odette Khan
- Johnny Wilson
- Joonee Gamboa
- Johnny Vicar
- Gladys Reyes
- Vic Varrion
- Rey Sagum
- Danny Riel
- Rene Matias
- Grego Gavino
- Robert Talby
- Dave Moreno
- Jess Bernardo

== Production ==
Ambush was one of the first major roles of Bobby Zshornack and Leo Lazaro, part of a group called the "Escolta Boys" who mostly starred in action films. On April 11, Beverly Vergel did her own stunt of driving a pickup truck through a fruit stand.

== Critical response ==
Lav Diaz, writing for the Manila Standard, gave a mildly positive review of the film. He praised the film's non-propagandistic and unbiased depiction of the ideological conflicts between communist revolutionaries such as the Sparrow Unit and enforcers of the law, but considered the filmmakers' inclusion of an inexperienced recruit within the demanding unit as unbelievable and the film's "biggest mistake", in addition to its other technical faults. He concluded, however, that if viewers watched the film solely for its action, it is worth the cost of admission.

== Accolades ==
Group	Category	Name	Result
PMPC Star Awards for Movies	Best New Actor	Bobby Zshornack	Nominated
PMPC Star Awards for Movies	Best Child Performer	Gladys Reyes	Nominated

== See also ==
Other film depictions of the Sparrow Unit starring Ronnie Ricketts:

- Target: Sparrow Unit (1987)
- Target: Maganto (1988)
- Alex Boncayao Brigade (1989)
