= Boy Recto =

Philippine action film

- Directed by: Jett C. Espiritu
- Screenplay by: Jun Lawas; Jett C. Espiritu
- Story by: Jun Lawas
- Produced by: Wally Chua; Victor Villegas
- Starring: Ronnie Ricketts
- Cinematography: Val Dauz
- Edited by: Renato de Leon
- Music by: Jaime Fabregas
- Production company: Moviestars Production
- Distributed by: Moviestars Production
- Release date: October 7, 1992
- Running time: 112 minutes
- Country: Philippines
- Language: Filipino

Boy Recto is a 1992 Philippine action film directed and co-written by Jett C. Espiritu. The film stars Ronnie Ricketts in the title role.

The film is streaming online on YouTube.

== Cast ==
- Ronnie Ricketts as Restituto / Boy Recto
- Aiko Melendez as Ester Legarda
- Jess Lapid Jr. as Lupo Garcia
- Bembol Roco as Rip
- Michael de Mesa as Alexander Aguila
- Atoy Co as Damian Mendiola
- Kimberly Diaz as Raquel Monte
- Marita Zobel as Aling Chayong
- Zandro Zamora as Kabo de Leon
- Fred Moro as Fredo
- Philip Gamboa as Police Sgt.
- Ramil Rodriguez as Fiscal Aguila
- Renato del Prado as Estong
- Gilda Aragon as Corazon
- Jeena Alvarez as Kristina
- Rowell Mariano as Noynoy
- Mely Tagasa as Ms. Ampalaya
- Ben Dato as Gardo
- Ross Rival as Cesar
- Rey Sagum as Esteban
- Conrad Poe as Kutsero
- Ramon Reyes as Warden
- Nanding Fernandez as Restituto's Father
- Roland Montes as Killer of Restituto's Father
