= CelebriTV =

Philippine television talk show

- Title card
- Genre: Talk show; Comedy
- Directed by: Philip Lazaro
- Presented by: Ai-Ai delas Alas; Joey de Leon; Lolit Solis
- Country of origin: Philippines
- Original language: Tagalog
- No. of episodes: 35

Production
- Executive producer: Maricar Teodoro
- Camera setup: Multiple-camera setup
- Running time: 42 minutes
- Production company: GMA Entertainment TV

Original release
- Network: GMA Network
- Release: September 19, 2015 – May 21, 2016

CelebriTV is a Philippine television comedy talk show broadcast by GMA Network. Hosted by Ai-Ai delas Alas, Joey de Leon and Lolit Solis, it premiered on September 19, 2015. The show concluded on May 21, 2016, with a total of 35 episodes.

== Hosts ==
Hosts

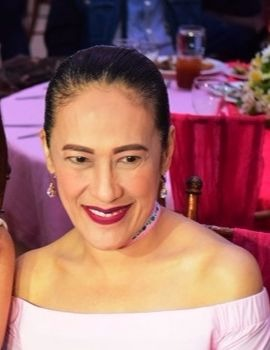
Ai-Ai delas Alas

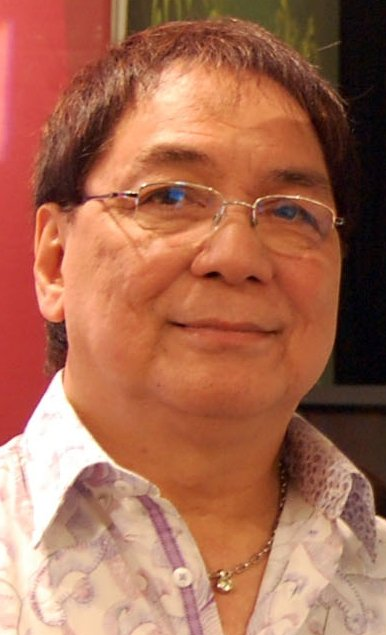
Joey de Leon

- Ai-Ai delas Alas
- Joey de Leon
- Lolit Solis

Co-hosts

- Ricky Lo
- Boobsie Wonderland
- Donita Nose
- AA ("AI-AIssistant")

== Ratings ==
According to AGB Nielsen Philippines' Mega Manila household television ratings, the pilot episode of CelebriTV earned a 17.6% rating. The final episode scored a 10.6% rating.
