= Dexter Doria =

Filipino actress

- Occupation: Actress
- Years active: 1977–present

Dexter Doria is a Filipino veteran actress. She has appeared in more than 175 films and several television programs from ABS-CBN and GMA Network, often in supporting roles.

== Early life ==
Doria graduated with a degree in AB Humanities from the University of the Philippines. In her time at UP, she also wrote film reviews for the magazine of The Manila Times.

== Career ==
Doria was working at an automotive office when one day in 1976 she accompanied her actress friend Nympha Bonifacio to the set of her film The College Girls. She was noticed by director Emmanuel Borlaza, who cast her on the spot for a scene with Eddie Gutierrez. Impressed, Borlaza wanted to add her to more scenes, but she had already left the set due to her office job. After another meeting with Borlaza, he and Bonifacio helped her start her acting career.

In 1977, Doria appeared in such movies as Elektrika Kasi, Eh!, Tisoy!, Babae!, Iligpit Si Pretty Boy, and Burlesk Queen, starring Vilma Santos and Rosemarie Gil, among others.

She was nominated for Best Supporting Actress in 1978 FAMAS Award for the movie Inay. She also received a nomination for Best Supporting Actress Gawad Urian Awards in Moral (1982).

Doria appeared on several game shows in the 2000s, appearing on Family Feud and then winning P300,000 on Who Wants to Be a Millionaire? In 2002, she joined the cast of the IBC-13 police tv show S.A.T.S.U. She also gave an excellent performance that year in the film Mga Munting Tinig, in which she played a school principal. For her performance, she was nominated once again for a Best Supporting Actress award in the Gawad Urian Awards, but lost to Elizabeth Oropesa. She got to act with Oropesa in the film Homecoming a year later.

Doria alternated between GMA and TV5 in 2010, appearing on both the comedy musical series Diva and the horror series Midnight DJ. In 2014, she joined the cast of GMA's Hiram na Alaala. In 2017, she finally got her first lead role in the film Paki, in which she played Noel Trinidad's wife of 50 years. Paki won Best Picture at the Cinema One Originals Film Festival, while she received a Best Actress nomination in that film festival.

In 2021, Doria finally won FAMAS Best Supporting Actress, a Gawad Urian Award, and a Gawad Tanglaw for Memories of Forgetting. In that film she played a mother suffering from Alzheimer's. She also played an activist nun in the musical film Katips that year. In 2022, she was a regular cast member of the GMA Network hit drama series Abot-Kamay na Pangarap, she played the role of Susanna "Susan" Burgos, a former cruel yet loving, kind-hearted, fierce, and supportive stepmother to Lyneth which is played by Carmina Villarroel and the step-grandmother to Analyn, which is played by Jillian Ward. The show was a ratings hit, beating all the evening primetime shows in the country.

== Personal life ==
Doria was married in her teens, and they had a son. Their marriage only lasted two years. Although she got into several other relationships later on in life, she is still single.

As a UP student, Doria took part in the First Quarter Storm. In 2022, she launched the digital show Didi Serye on her social media accounts in which she informed viewers about facts on the Martial Law era.

== Filmography ==
=== Film ===
Year	Title	Role
1977	Sugar Daddy	Rosie
1977	Inay	Becky
1982	Moral	Mrs. Torres
1983	Kirot	Divina
1984	Batuigas II: Pasukuin si Waway	Mrs. Marcelino
1985	Lalakwe	Sara
1985	Company of Women	Mama San
1988	Stomach In, Chest Out	
1988	I Love You 3x a Day	Stella
1988	Me and Ninja Liit	Mama San
1989	Alex Boncayao Brigade: The Liquidation Arm of the NPA	Fe
1989	Mga Kuwento ng Pag-ibig	Olga
1989	Pahiram ng Isang Umaga	Aleli Espiritu
1989	Valentina	Perla
1989	Impaktita	Mrs. Concepcion
1989	Sa Kuko ng Agila	Lolit
1989	Aso't Pusa	Maristela
1989	Estudyante Blues	Benita
1989	Jessa: Blusang Itim 2	Adela
1989	Ang Babaeng Nawawala sa Sarili	Mrs. Asuncion
1989	Rosenda	Glenda
1989	Huwag Kang Hahalik sa Diablo	Mona
1989	Boots Oyson: Sa Katawan Mo, Aagos ang Dugo!	Carmen
1990	Starzan III: The Jungle Triangle	Takla
1990	Tootsie Wootsie: Ang Bandang Walang Atrasan	Doña Barang
1990	Patigasan ang Labanan	Gorgonia
1990	Mana sa Ina	Olivia Sevilla
1990	Titser's Enemi No. 1	Goliath's Mother
1990	I Have 3 Eggs	Lorraine
1990	Hanggang Saan ang Tapang Mo?	Cynthia
1990	Bakit Ikaw Pa Rin?	Mrs. Manfort
1990	Pido Dida: Sabay Tayo	Shirley
1990	Naughty Boys	Madonna
1990	Inosente	Rosa
1990	Si Prinsipe Abante at ang Lihim ng Ibong Adarna	Amazon Queen
1990	Claudia	Orang
1991	Umiyak Pati Langit	Pilar
1991	Humanap Ka ng Panget: The Movie	Mrs. Arellano
1991	Pretty Boy Hoodlum	Senyang
1991	Barbi for President	Lily San Pedro
1991	Pido Dida 2 (Kasal Na)	Shirley
1992	Alabang Girls	Sister Mary
1992	Pacifico Guevarra: Dillinger ng Dos Pares	Denang
1992	Akin ang Pangarap Mo	Diding
1992	Daddy Goons	Doña Madonna
1992	Grease Gun Gang	Mrs. Lee
1992	Working Students	Mrs. Batubalani
1993	Kapag Iginuhit ang Hatol ng Puso	Recruiter
1993	Pido Dida 3: May Kambal Na	Shirley
1993	Dodong Armado	Nora
1993	Isa Lang ang Buhay Mo, Sgt. Bobby Aguilar!	Tita Caring
1993	Task Force Habagat	Mrs. Mendez
1994	Chick Boys	Mrs. Sipag
1994	Forever	Mrs. Tagle
1994	The Secrets of Sarah Jane: Sana'y Mapatawad Mo!	Loretta
1994	Marami Ka Pang Kakaining Bigas	Lagring
1994	Epimaco Velasco: NBI	Mother of 2yr. Old Girl
1994	Lucas Abelardo	Governor's Wife
1994	Brat Pack: Mga Pambayad Atraso	Mrs. Fernandez
1994	Col. Billy Bibit, RAM	Mother of Bibit
1994	Kalabog en Bosyo	Doña Patutsang
1994	Sa Isang Sulok ng Mga Pangarap	Mayet
1994	Talahib at Rosas	Abba's mother
1994	Tatlong Anak, Isang Ama	Jack's mother
1995	Urban Rangers	Jim's mother
1995	Paano ang Kahapon Kung Wala Na ang Ngayon?	Adela
1995	Barkadang Walang Atrasan	Mother of Alvin
1995	Kapitan Tumba: The Captain Jose Huevos Story	Sabrina
1995	Manalo, Matalo, Mahal Kita!	Mangkukulam / Manghuhula
1995	Ang Syota Kong Balikbayan	Delia
1995	Epifanio Ang Bilas Ko: NB-Eye	Madonna
1995	Victim No. 1: Delia Maga (Jesus, Pray for Us!) – A Massacre in Singapore	Mrs. Sy
1995	Pustahan Tayo! Mahal Mo Ako!	Mrs. Dolor
1995	Sabado Nights	Shiela's mom
1996	Tubusin Mo ng Bala ang Puso Ko	The Manghuhula
1996	Bayarang Puso	Inday Malabanan
1996	Kailanman	Meding
1996	April Boys: Sana Ay Mahalin Mo Rin Ako	Mrs. Irlandez
1997	Paano Ang Puso Ko?	Cita
1997	Nasaan ang Puso?	Tia Ines
1997	Ang Pulubi at ang Prinsesa	Tita Bella
1997	Habang Nasasaktan, Lalong Tumatapang	Emil's mother
1997	Kaliwa't Kanan, Sakit ng Katawan	Maggie
1997	Kool Ka Lang	Chuchi
1997	Matinik Na Bading, Mga Syokeng Buking	Mommy Claire
1997	Pag-ibig Ko Sa'Yo'y Totoo	Mother of Beth
1998	Nagbibinata	Lilian Arandia
1998	Hiling	Margarita
1998	Honey, Nasa Langit Na Ba Ako?	Mrs. dela Paz
1999	Mister Mo, Lover Ko	Dra. Dumalaga
1999	Maldita	Marita
2000	Spirit Warriors	Ms. Arriola
2001	Tusong Twosome	Doña Mercedes
2001	Weyt a Minit, Kapeng Mainit!	Madam Amparing
2002	Hari ng Selda: Anak ni Baby Ama 2	Ladyguard
2002	Markova: Comfort Gay	Markova's Mother
2002	Hanggang Kailan Ako Papatay Para Mabuhay?	Rosario
2002	Singsing ni Lola	Cellmate
2003	Xerex	Lyla
2003	Small Voices	Mrs. Pantalan
2003	Liberated	Auntie Evita
2004	Otso-Otso Pamela-Mela-Wan	Mrs. Cabangon
2004	Check-Inn	Aling Dely
2004	Pa-siyam	Mila
2004	Liberated 2	Auntie Evita
2008	Dobol Trobol: Lets Get Redi 2 Rambol!	Dexter
2011	Pak! Pak! My Dr. Kwak!	Ester
2011	Shake, Rattle & Roll 13	Mrs. Reyes
2015	Etiquette for Mistresses	Alicia
2015	Felix Manalo	Tiya Isabel
2019	Man and Wife	Tuding
2021	Katips	Sister Claire
2022	Eyes on Fire	Carmelita
2025	Child No. 82: Anak ni Boy Kana	Perla Maniego

=== Television series ===
Year	Title	Role(s)
1987	Maricel Regal Drama Special	Carol Silva
1996	Tierra Sangre	Margarita Sangre
1998	Halik sa Apoy	Cora
1999	Maalaala Mo Kaya: Forceps	Guest
1999–2001	Marinella	Belinda
2002	Sana ay Ikaw na Nga	Rebecca
2004	Love to Love: Pretty Boy	Recurring Role
2004	Spirits	Miss V
2006	Mars Ravelo's Captain Barbell	Guest
2007	Dalawang Tisoy	Mimi
2007	Princess Charming	Loreta
2007	Rounin	Guest
2007	Margarita	Magda
2007	Impostora	Dorina
2007	Zaido: Pulis Pangkalawakan	Selma
2008	Komiks Presents: Varga	Perla
2008	Sine Novela: Maging Akin Ka Lamang	Aida Abrigo
2008	Maalaala Mo Kaya: Larawan	Caring
2008	Obra	Various
2009	Sine Novela: Ngayon at Kailanman	Inya Benitez
2009	Precious Hearts Romances Presents: The Bud Brothers Series	Mrs. Labrador
2010	Maalaala Mo Kaya: Larawan	Jesusa
2010	Sine Novela: Trudis Liit	Carmen "Menang" Cristobal
2010	Maalaala Mo Kaya: Seaweeds	Ceding
2010	Diva	Guest
2010	Maalaala Mo Kaya: Bracelet	Evelyn Chen
2011	Spooky Nights	
2011	Maalaala Mo Kaya: Medalyon	Francisca
2011	Nita Negrita	Segunda
2011	Maalaala Mo Kaya: Tulay	Guest
2011	Sinner or Saint	Yvette
2012	Maalaala Mo Kaya: Singsing	Guest
2012	Luna Blanca	Eloisa
2012	Sana ay Ikaw na Nga	Sofia
2012	Maalaala Mo Kaya: Kwintas	Guest
2012	Wansapanataym: Hannah Panahon	Guest
2012	Wansapanataym: Kuryentina	Aning
2012	Biritera	Celeste
2012	My Beloved	Old Dessa
2013	Maalaala Mo Kaya: Drawing	Pacing
2013	My Husband's Lover	Luz
2013	Villa Quintana	Pilar Digos
2014	Hiram na Alaala	Yolanda "Ola" Dizon
2015	Pari 'Koy	Salome Marasigan
2015	Little Nanay	Flor
2016	Hanggang Makita Kang Muli	Yolanda
2016	Sa Piling ni Nanay	Almeda "Meding" Alfonse
2017	Trops	Armida Santiago
2017	Mulawin vs. Ravena	Elena
2018–2019	Playhouse	Rebecca "Becca" Ilaban
2019	Alex and Amie	Principal Carmela "Mel" Ronquillo-Diaz
2019	Dragon Lady	Rebecca Chan
2019	Beautiful Justice	Lorna Chua
2019–2020	The Gift	Diding
2021	Kung Pwede Lang	Aling Baby
2021	Niña Niño	Lola Juanita
2022–2024	Abot-Kamay na Pangarap	Susana "Susan" Burgos

=== Television anthologies ===
Year	Title	Role(s)
2017	Tadhana: Ang Batang Refugee	Luding
2018	Dear Uge: Bagong Bahay, Bagong Away	Lenlen
2018	Tadhana: Ang Disgrasyada	Nanay Beth
2018	Magpakailanman: Ang Kamao ng Beking Boksingero (The Yohan Golez Story)	Selya
2018	Dear Uge: I Hate You, I Love You	Rowena Bugayon
2018	Tadhana: Panganay	Esper
2018	Imbestigador: Traysikel	Rowena Dizon
2019	Tadhana: Lindol	Su Wei
2019	Dear Uge: Senior's Love Affair	Joy
2019	Magpakailanman: Lotto Winner, Naging Loser	Nanay Mimang
2019	Tadhana: Yaya CEO	Dolor
2019	Imbestigador: Katiwala	Emy Marin
2019	Maalaala Mo Kaya: Alkansya	Estrella
2019	Imbestigador: Mag-inang Cybersex	Almira
2020	Magpakailanman: Ang Kabit na Walang Mukha	Rhea
2022	Tadhana: Heredera	Nita
2022	Imbestigador: Bata sa Kanal	Edwina Garcia

== Awards and nominations ==
Year	Work	Award	Category	Result	Source
1978	Inay	Best Supporting Actress	FAMAS Awards	Nominated	
1982	Moral	Best Supporting Actress	Gawad Urian Awards	Nominated	
2002	Mga Munting Tinig	Best Supporting Actress	Gawad Urian Awards	Nominated	
2017	Malinka Ya Labi	Best Performance (shared with her castmates)	Young Critics Circle	Nominated	
2017	Paki	Best Actress	Cinema One Originals Film Festival	Nominated	
2018	Paki	Best Actress	Luna Awards	Nominated	
2018	Paki	Best Actress	FAMAS Awards	Nominated	
2018	Paki	Best Actress	Gawad Urian Awards	Nominated	
2018	—N/a	Presidential Jury Award for Acting Excellence	Gawad Tanglaw Awards	Won	
2021	Memories of Forgetting	Best Supporting Actress	FAMAS Awards	Won	
2021	Memories of Forgetting	Best Supporting Actress	Gawad Tanglaw Awards	Won	
2021	Memories of Forgetting	Best Supporting Actress	Gawad Urian Awards	Won	
2022	Memories of Forgetting	Best Supporting Actress	Filipino Arts & Cinema International Film Festival	Won	
2023	Memories of Forgetting	Best Supporting Actress	Star Awards for Movies	Nominated	
