= Ricky Lo =

Filipino television commentator1946–2021)

- Born: Ricardo Fua Lo; April 21, 1946; Las Navas, Samar, Philippines
- Died: May 4, 2021 (aged 75); Philippines
- Education: University of the East (AB)
- Occupations: Entertainment writer, commentator, television host
- Years active: 1969–2021
- Website: Official website

Ricardo "Ricky" Fua Lo (Tagalog: [ˈɾiki lɔ]; April 21, 1946 – May 4, 2021) was a Filipino entertainment writer and commentator, and TV host.

== Early life and education ==
Lo, born of Chinese descent, was a native of Las Navas, Northern Samar, where he finished grade school. He finished high school at the bilingual Tabaco Pei Ching School in Tabaco, Albay, and took up AB English at the University of the East. A fan of feature films, he aspired to be a gardener of actress Susan Roces.

== Career ==
=== Editorial career ===
Lo did a stint as entertainment editor, first as an editorial assistant for Variety magazine, The Manila Times' Sunday supplement where he started his "FunFare" column. He then went on to join the Philippine Daily Express as a staff writer for the newspaper publisher's Express Week magazine and then as a deskman for The Evening Express. He eventually wrote the main broadsheet. Lo then became an editorial assistant for Daily Express' Weekend Sunday magazine until 1986. He joined The Philippine Star in July 1986 where he revived his "FunFare" column and started his regular Sunday feature, "Conversations with Ricky Lo".

Lo is the author of Star-Studded, the first compilation of his articles on movie stars, which he released in 1995. Another book, Conversations with Ricky Lo, was released in 2001. The book bears Lo's sensitive, intelligent, and penetrating style of handling interviews.

=== TV hostings ===
In 1999, Lo became one of the hosts of the showbiz-oriented talk show, The Buzz, on ABS-CBN. He later transferred to GMA Network and hosted Startalk from 2008 to 2015 and CelebriTV which ran from 2015 to 2016. He also hosted other showbiz-oriented programs such as The Ricky Lo Exclusives in QTV (then GMA News TV; now GTV) and Showbiz Stripped.

=== Notable coverage and interviews ===
Lo was the first to write about the Martin Nievera and Pops Fernandez break-up, then, in 2008, the Karylle and Dingdong Dantes break-up.

In January 2013, Lo's interview with Anne Hathaway drew flak from netizens. Critics averred that the interview was a disgrace for posing questions that seemed not fitting for a well-known actress. Colleagues in the industry supported Lo, however, and referred to his long experience in entertainment journalism. Reportedly, Lo was merely amused with the negative comments and was not offended. Some of Lo's supposedly-awkward questions that he threw at Hathaway were about her weight loss in the film Les Misérables and real-life experience with hunger that seems to have offended the actress. Lea Salonga, who was mentioned in the interview, explained that while she cannot speak for Hathaway, she has been trained to expect all kinds of questions, ranging from broadsheet to tabloid. Salonga noted, however, that interviews are also about how questions are asked.

== Death ==
Lo died on May 4, 2021, from a stroke.

== Filmography ==
=== Television shows ===
Year	Title	Role
1999–2003	The Buzz	Host
2005–2007	Showbiz Stripped	Host
2007–2009	The Ricky Lo Exclusives	Host
2008–2015	Startalk	Host
2015–2016	CelebriTV	Host
