= Lolit Solis =

Filipino journalist and talent manager (1947–2025)

- Born: Maria Lolita Arguelles Solis; May 20, 1947; Sampaloc, Manila, Philippines
- Died: July 3, 2025 (aged 78); Manila, Philippines
- Occupations: Television host, showbiz columnist, talent manager
- Years active: 1974–2025
- Spouse: Angie Pasamonte (separated)
- Children: 2

Maria Lolita Arguelles Solis (May 20, 1947 – July 3, 2025) was a Filipino talk show host, entertainment news writer, and talent manager.

== Early life and education ==
Solis was born on May 20, 1947, in Manila, Philippines. She grew up in an informal settlement along Lardizabal Street, Sampaloc, near National University, where she attended one journalism seminar.

While some reports stated she studied Mass Communication or Political Science at University of the Philippines Diliman, an investigation by the Philippine Entertainment Portal (PEP) into the UP Office of the Registrar revealed no official record of a "Lolita Solis" ever being enrolled there.

== Career ==
Solis first worked as a reporter covering the police beat in the 1970s before shifting to entertainment reporting for The Philippine Star. In the 1980s, she also began managing actors, including Gabby Concepcion, Tonton Gutierrez, Christopher de Leon, Lorna Tolentino, Rudy Fernandez, Bong Revilla and Paolo Contis.

In 1995, Solis became the host of the long-running GMA Network entertainment talk show Startalk until its conclusion in 2015. She also wrote as a columnist for the tabloid Pilipino Star Ngayon and The Philippine Star. In 2009 to 2010, she was a judge for the fifth season of the reality talent competition StarStruck.

Solis also appeared in several films such as Lost Command (1988) and My Kontrabida Girl (2012). She also appeared in television series such as Daboy en Da Girl and Lyra.

=== Controversies ===
==== Manila Film Festival scandal ====
Solis was involved in the 1994 Manila Film Festival scandal, wherein co-hosts Rocky Gutierrez and Miss Universe Mauritius Viveka Babajee announced the names of Solis' then-talent Gabby Concepcion and beauty queen Ruffa Gutierrez as Best Actor and Actress, instead of Edu Manzano and Aiko Melendez, who were the actual winners. Another co-host, Gretchen Barretto, later revealed the scam, and accused Solis and Annabelle Rama as masterminds behind it. Solis and six others were charged. Solis ultimately pleaded guilty to the offense of orchestrating the scam. She was ordered to pay a fine and placed under court supervision under probationary law.

Solis subsequently stopped attending awarding ceremonies after the controversy, which she referred to as both a "nightmare and the biggest lesson in her life". She also admitted to having attempted to commit suicide at the height of the scandal.

==== Lawsuits ====
In 1994, Solis sued Gabby Concepcion, accusing him of not paying her commissions and related fees during her wardship. However, he filed a counterclaim and won the case in 2004, with the Court of Appeals ordering Solis to pay him P700,000 in damages and litigation fees instead.

In 2007, Solis was indicted along with Pilipino Star Ngayon entertainment editor Veronica Samio for libel in a P12 million-lawsuit by actors Sam Milby and Piolo Pascual after she alleged in her column on Pilipino Star Ngayon that the both actors were spotted sharing "sweet moments" together at the Sofitel Philippine Plaza Manila. The case was withdrawn after Solis retracted her claims. In 2017, Pascual and Solis publicly reconciled.

In 2022, Solis was expelled from the Professional Artist Managers Inc. (PAMI), of which she was a founding member, for breaching the organization's confidentiality agreement. This followed a dispute between her and actress Bea Alonzo and Alonzo's talent manager Shirley Kuan over Solis's exclusion from an event of Alonzo's. Solis also said that she had also been sued for libel by Alma Moreno, which was eventually withdrawn.

== Personal life and death ==
Solis was married to engineer-architect Angie Pasamonte but separated shortly after amid financial problems. She had two daughters. During her marriage, Solis lived in Pampanga before moving back to Manila. She eventually resided in Fairview, Quezon City.

In 2022, she was hospitalized. She later shared that she had been regularly undergoing dialysis. She died from a heart attack on July 3, 2025, at the age of 78.

== Works ==
=== Film ===
Year	Title	Source
1985	I Can't Stop Loving You	
1988	Lost Command	
1992	Kailangan Kita	
2012	My Kontrabida Girl	
2015	The Last Pinoy Action King	

=== Television ===
Year	Title	Role	Notes
1974–1975	Katuwaan Sa Siyete	Host	Herself
1975–1976	The Star with Lolit Solis	Host	Herself
1976–1982	Newsday	Segment anchor	Herself
1986–1987	Scoop	Host	Herself
1991–1992	Sine Silip	Host	Herself
1995–2015	Startalk	Host	Herself
1996–1997	Lyra	Marcia	Supporting cast
2002–2003	Daboy en Da Girl	Manay Charing	Supporting cast
2009	Starstruck V	Council	Herself
2010	Survivor Philippines		Herself
2015–2016	CelebriTV	Host	Herself

=== Radio ===
Title	Notes
Gano’n? Showbiz Achuchuchu	Host
Dobol A sa Dobol B	Starpok / Istorbo! segment host
Star Patrol	Host
