= Startalk (Philippine talk show) =

Philippine television talk show

- Title card from 2014 to 2015
- Also known as: Startalk: The Only Showbiz Authority (Note: 2012–15); Startalk TX (Note: 2010–12)
- Genre: Talk show
- Directed by: Floy Quintos
- Presented by: Lolit Solis; Butch Francisco; Joey de Leon; Ricky Lo; Heart Evangelista
- Country of origin: Philippines
- Original language: Tagalog
- No. of episodes: 1,024

Production
- Camera setup: Multiple-camera setup
- Running time: 45–120 minutes
- Production company: GMA Entertainment TV

Original release
- Network: GMA Network
- Release: October 8, 1995 – September 12, 2015

Startalk, formerly called as Startalk: The Only Showbiz Authority and Startalk TX is a Philippine television talk show broadcast by GMA Network. Originally hosted by Boy Abunda, Kris Aquino and Lolit Solis, it premiered on October 8, 1995. The show concluded on September 12, 2015, with a total of 1,024 episodes. Solis, Butch Francisco, Joey de Leon, Ricky Lo and Heart Evangelista served as the final hosts. It is the longest running talk show in the Philippines.

== Overview ==
Startalk premiered on October 8, 1995, and was filmed at the Fernandina Suites. Boy Abunda, Kris Aquino and Lolit Solis served as the hosts. Aquino left the show in 1996 and Dawn Zulueta later joined as a host. In 1997, Zulueta quit the show and Rosanna Roces served as her replacement. The show also featured Steve, Fayatollah and Pepita as segment hosts of T! The Tigbak Authority. Steve also served as a regular voice-over for the show. The show later added new segments such as Da Who, Startalk True Stories and Alok Bati. On June 5, 1999, Abunda departed the show and was replaced by Butch Francisco. In June 2004, Roces left the show.

Lorna Tolentino and Joey de Leon became guest co-hosts until they were promoted as regular hosts. In 2008, Tolentino left the show and Ricky Lo of The Philippine Star served as her replacement.

In April 2010, the show was retitled as Startalk TX. In 2013, Heart Evangelista joined as a host. The show's 1,000th episode aired on March 21, 2015 and its 1,024th episode served as the show's final episode. It featured a lookback on the show, with clips of the previously aired episodes and a segment featuring Abunda.

== Hosts ==
Hosts

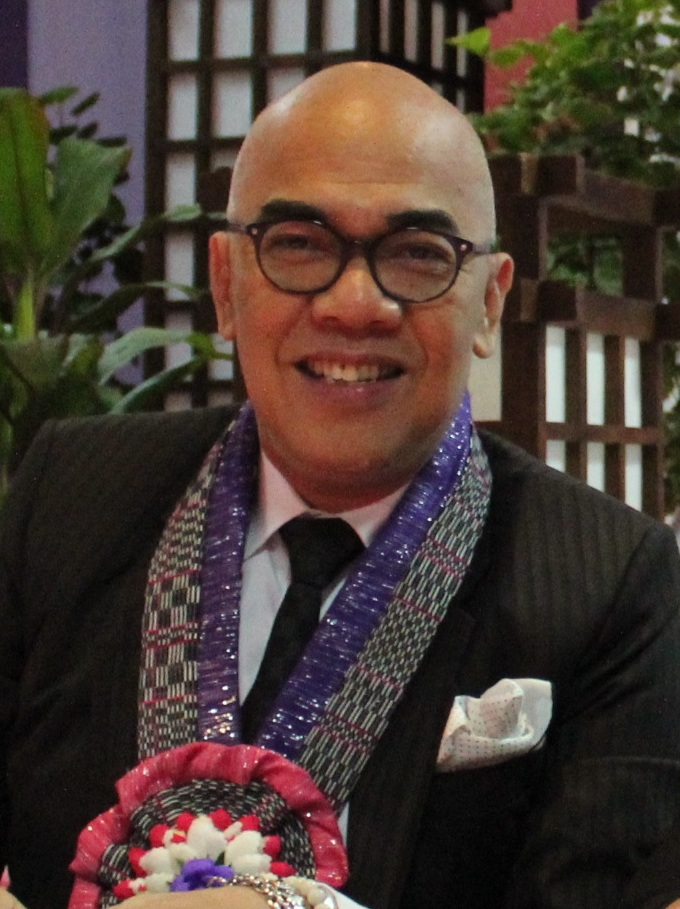
Boy Abunda

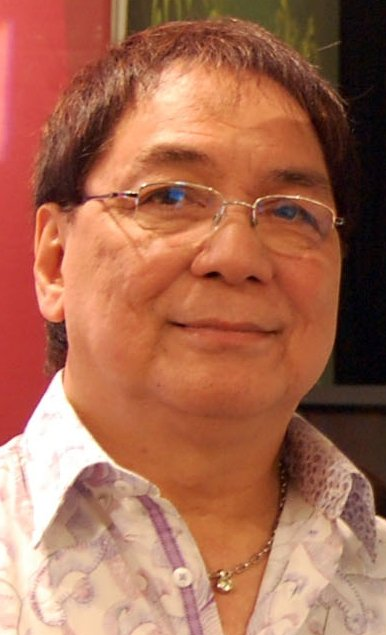
Joey de Leon

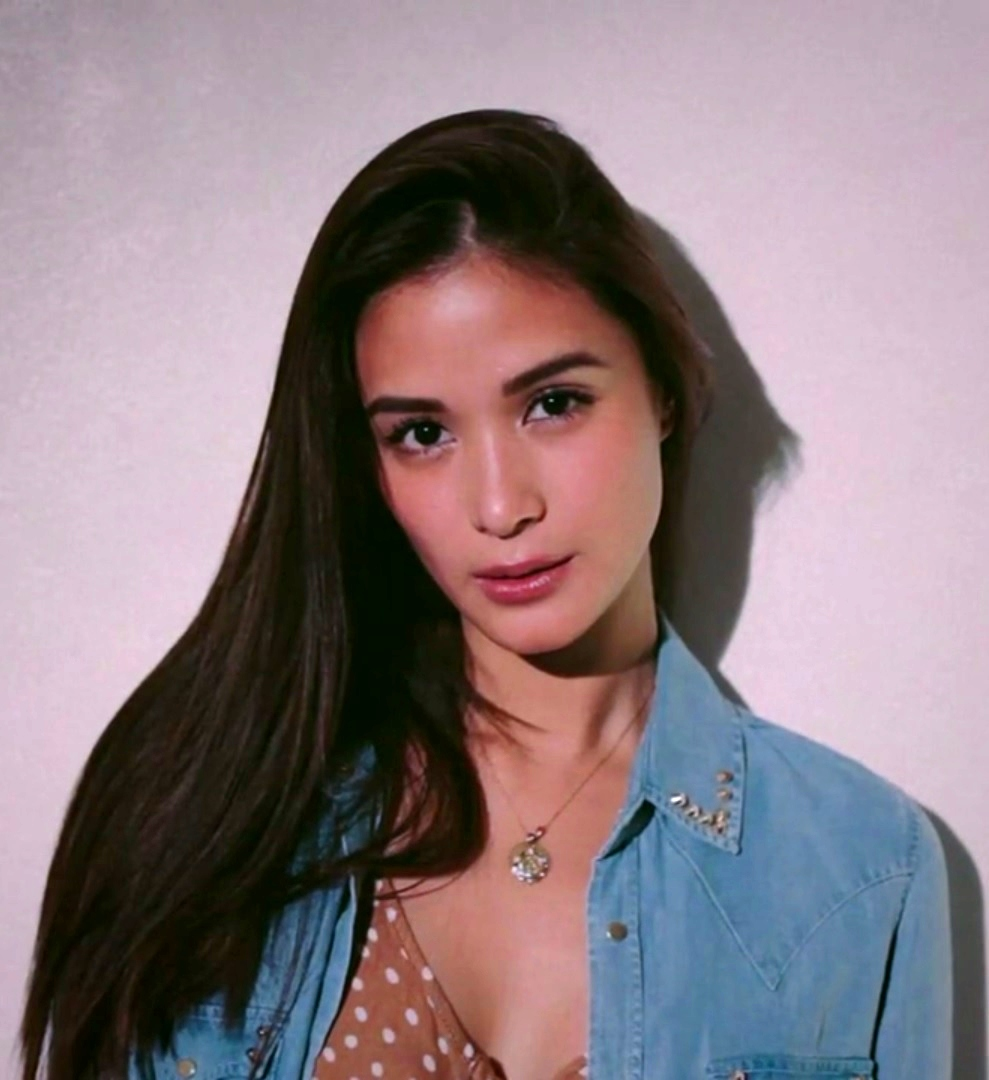
Heart Evangelista

- Lolit Solis (1995–2015)
- Boy Abunda (1995–99)
- Kris Aquino (1995–96)
- Dawn Zulueta (1996–97)
- Rosanna Roces (1997–2004)
- Butch Francisco (1999–2015)
- Lorna Tolentino (2004–08)
- Joey de Leon (2004–15)
- Ricky Lo (2008–15)
- Heart Evangelista (2013–15)

Segment hosts

- Pepita (1998–2010)
- Fayatollah (1998–2010)
- Steve (1998–2010)
- Chariz Solomon (2007–15)
- Jan Manual (2007–15)
- Vaness del Moral (2007–15)
- Alyssa Alano (2008–13)
- Nina Kodaka (2010–15)
- Nathalie Hart (2010–15)

== Ratings ==
According to AGB Nielsen Philippines' Mega Manila household television ratings, the final episode of Startalk scored a 12.7% rating.

== Accolades ==
Accolades received by Startalk
Year	Award	Category	Recipient	Result	Ref.
1996	10th PMPC Star Awards for Television	Best Showbiz Talk Show	Startalk	Won	
1999	13th PMPC Star Awards for Television	Best Showbiz Oriented Talk Show	Startalk	Won	
1999	13th PMPC Star Awards for Television	Best Showbiz Oriented Talk Show Host		Won	
2000	14th PMPC Star Awards for Television	Best Showbiz Oriented Talk Show	Startalk	Won	
2002	16th PMPC Star Awards for Television	Best Showbiz Oriented Talk Show	Startalk	Won	
2003	17th PMPC Star Awards for Television	Best Showbiz Oriented Talk Show	Startalk	Nominated	
2003	17th PMPC Star Awards for Television	Best Female Showbiz-Oriented Talk Show Host	Rosanna Roces	Nominated	
2004	18th PMPC Star Awards for Television	Best Showbiz Oriented Talk Show	Startalk	Nominated	
2004	18th PMPC Star Awards for Television	Best Male Showbiz-Oriented Talk Show Host	Butch Francisco	Nominated	
2004	18th PMPC Star Awards for Television	Best Female Showbiz-Oriented Talk Show Host	Rosanna Roces	Nominated	
2004	18th PMPC Star Awards for Television	Best Female Showbiz-Oriented Talk Show Host	Lolit Solis	Nominated	
2005	Golden Screen TV Awards	Outstanding Showbiz-Oriented Program	Startalk	Nominated	
2005	Golden Screen TV Awards	Outstanding Showbiz-Oriented Program Host	Butch Francisco	Nominated	
2005	Golden Screen TV Awards	Outstanding Showbiz-Oriented Program Host	Lorna Tolentino	Nominated	
2006	20th PMPC Star Awards for Television	Best Showbiz Oriented Talk Show	Startalk	Won	
2006	20th PMPC Star Awards for Television	Best Male Showbiz-Oriented Talk Show Host	Joey de Leon	Nominated	
2007	21st PMPC Star Awards for Television	Best Female Showbiz-Oriented Talk Show Host	Lorna Tolentino	Nominated	
2007	21st PMPC Star Awards for Television	Best Male Showbiz-Oriented Talk Show Host	Joey de Leon	Nominated	
2007	21st PMPC Star Awards for Television	Best New Female TV Personality	Chariz Solomon	Nominated	
2007	21st PMPC Star Awards for Television	Best Showbiz Oriented Talk Show	Startalk	Nominated	
2008	22nd PMPC Star Awards for Television	Best Female Showbiz-Oriented Talk Show Host	Lolit Solis	Nominated	
2008	22nd PMPC Star Awards for Television	Best Showbiz Oriented/Celebrity Talk Show	Startalk	Nominated	
2009	23rd PMPC Star Awards for Television	Best Male Showbiz-Oriented Talk Show Host	Joey de Leon	Nominated	
2009	23rd PMPC Star Awards for Television	Best Showbiz Oriented/Celebrity Talk Show	Startalk	Nominated	
2010	24th PMPC Star Awards for Television	Best Male Showbiz-Oriented Talk Show Host	Joey de Leon	Nominated	
2010	24th PMPC Star Awards for Television	Best Showbiz Oriented/Celebrity Talk Show	Startalk	Nominated	
2011	Golden Screen TV Awards	Outstanding Showbiz Talk Program	Startalk	Nominated	
2011	Golden Screen TV Awards	Outstanding Showbiz Talk Program Host	Joey de Leon	Nominated	
2011	25th PMPC Star Awards for Television	Best Male Showbiz-Oriented Talk Show Host	Joey de Leon	Nominated	
2011	25th PMPC Star Awards for Television	Best Male Showbiz-Oriented Talk Show Host	Ricky Lo	Nominated	
2011	25th PMPC Star Awards for Television	Best Showbiz Oriented/Celebrity Talk Show	Startalk	Nominated	
2012	26th PMPC Star Awards for Television	Best Male Showbiz-Oriented Talk Show Host	Butch Francisco	Nominated	
2012	26th PMPC Star Awards for Television	Best Male Showbiz-Oriented Talk Show Host	Ricky Lo	Nominated	
2012	26th PMPC Star Awards for Television	Best Showbiz Oriented/Celebrity Talk Show	Startalk	Nominated	
2013	Golden Screen TV Awards	Outstanding Showbiz Talk Program	Startalk	Nominated	
2013	Golden Screen TV Awards	Outstanding Male Showbiz Talk Program Host	Joey de Leon	Nominated	
2013	27th PMPC Star Awards for Television	Best Female Showbiz-Oriented Talk Show Host	Lolit Solis	Nominated	
2013	27th PMPC Star Awards for Television	Best Male Showbiz-Oriented Talk Show Host	Joey de Leon	Nominated	
2013	27th PMPC Star Awards for Television	Best Male Showbiz-Oriented Talk Show Host	Butch Francisco	Nominated	
2013	27th PMPC Star Awards for Television	Best Male Showbiz-Oriented Talk Show Host	Ricky Lo	Nominated	
2013	27th PMPC Star Awards for Television	Best Showbiz Oriented Talk Show	Startalk	Won	
2014	Golden Screen TV Awards	Outstanding Showbiz Talk Program	Startalk TX	Nominated	
2014	Golden Screen TV Awards	Outstanding Male Showbiz Talk Program Host	Joey de Leon	Nominated	
2014	28th PMPC Star Awards for Television	Best Female Showbiz-Oriented Talk Show Host	Heart Evangelista	Nominated	
2014	28th PMPC Star Awards for Television	Best Female Showbiz-Oriented Talk Show Host	Lolit Solis	Nominated	
2014	28th PMPC Star Awards for Television	Best Male Showbiz-Oriented Talk Show Host	Joey de Leon	Nominated	
2014	28th PMPC Star Awards for Television	Best Male Showbiz-Oriented Talk Show Host	Butch Francisco	Nominated	
2014	28th PMPC Star Awards for Television	Best Male Showbiz-Oriented Talk Show Host	Ricky Lo	Won	
2014	28th PMPC Star Awards for Television	Best Showbiz Oriented Talk Show	Startalk	Nominated	
2015	29th PMPC Star Awards for Television	Best Female Showbiz-Oriented Talk Show Host	Heart Evangelista	Nominated	
2015	29th PMPC Star Awards for Television	Best Female Showbiz-Oriented Talk Show Host	Lolit Solis	Nominated	
2015	29th PMPC Star Awards for Television	Best Male Showbiz-Oriented Talk Show Host	Joey de Leon	Nominated	
2015	29th PMPC Star Awards for Television	Best Male Showbiz-Oriented Talk Show Host	Butch Francisco	Nominated	
2015	29th PMPC Star Awards for Television	Best Male Showbiz-Oriented Talk Show Host	Ricky Lo	Won	
2015	29th PMPC Star Awards for Television	Best Showbiz Oriented Talk Show	Startalk	Nominated	
