= Sonny Parsons =

Filipino actor, singer, director, and politician (1958–2020)

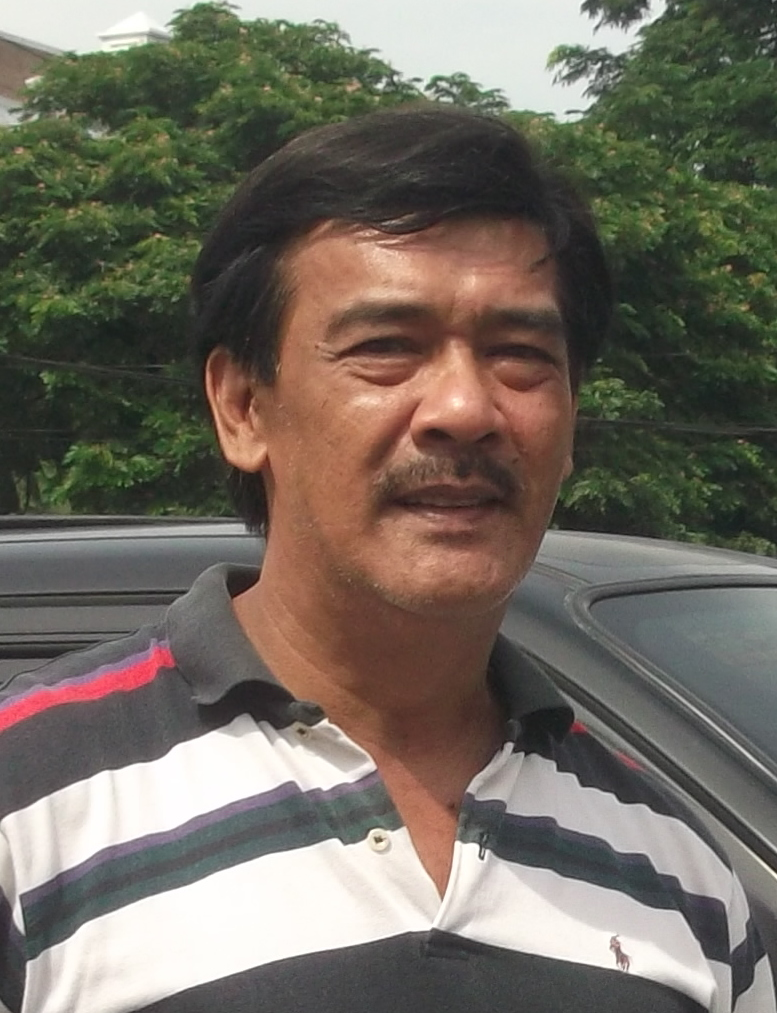
- Parsons in 2013

Member of the Marikina Municipal Council
- In office June 30, 1992 – June 30, 1995

Personal details
- Born: Parsons Agliam Nabiula Jr. August 22, 1958 Marikina, Rizal, Philippines
- Died: May 10, 2020 (aged 61) Tayabas, Quezon, Philippines
- Resting place: Heavens Gate Memorial Garden II, Antipolo, Rizal, Philippines
- Parent: Parsons Nabiula (father)
- Occupation: Actor; singer; film director; former politician
- Nicknames: Jong; Sonny

Parsons Agliam Nabiula Jr. (August 22, 1958 – May 10, 2020), known professionally as Sonny Parsons, was a Filipino actor, singer, director, and politician who was a member of Hagibis, an all-male sing-and-dance group active in the late 1970s to the early 1980s, who were coined as the Filipino version of the Village People. He served as a member of the Marikina Municipal Council from 1992 to 1995.

== Early life ==
Parsons was born to Parsons Nabiula, a Constabulary officer from Sulu and former Olympic swimmer.

== Singing career ==
In the late 1970s to 1980s, Parsons was a member of the Manila sound group Hagibis together with Bernie Fineza, Mike Respall, Joji Garcia, and Mon Picazo. Their hit songs included "Legs", "Babae", "Lalake", and "Katawan" (a theme song in Palibhasa Lalake, a Philippine TV sitcom series), among others. In 2001, Hagibis reunited and released one album under Star Records. He performed in a series of concerts at various venues such as in Hobbit House (Ermita), Hobbit East (Antipolo), Bodega City (Quezon Ave) and Cowboy Grill (Malate), among others. In 2011, he was a special guest in the Philippines leg of the greatest hits tour of Bobby Kimball (original lead singer of Toto).

== Acting career ==
In 1981, the Hagibis members made a film titled Legs, Katawan, Babae (lit. 'Legs, Body, Woman') with Laarni Enriquez, Myrna Castillo and Jess Lapid, Jr., and directed by Tony Ferrer. When Hagibis split up in the 1980s, Parsons became an actor, director, and politician. He appeared in many action films in the late 1980s and early 1990s. He starred with Ronnie Ricketts in the 1989 action film UZI Brother 9mm which was directed by Francis 'Jun' Posadas. His first TV guest appearance was in the 1991 teleserye Agila which starred Val Sotto, Aurora Sevilla and Roy Alvarez. He produced, directed, and starred in the film Bala Para sa Katarungan for Regal Films in 1997.

As a result of the July 2002 attempted robbery of Parsons' house, an autobiographical film he was in the middle of shooting titled Konsehal, Halal Kang Palaban (lit. 'Councilor, You Were Elected a Fighter') had to be shelved, with its producer backing out due to the incident.

Parsons played a guest role as the main villain to Coco Martin in the 2017 action-drama TV series Ang Probinsyano.

== Political career ==
In 1986, Parsons campaigned for the reelection of president Ferdinand Marcos in the 1986 snap election.

In 1992, Parsons was elected councilor in Marikina. A member of the minority bloc, Parsons was among the five councilors who were vehemently opposed to the actions and policies of Mayor Bayani Fernando, dubbing themselves "Voltes V" and calling for Fernando's ouster within their first year in office. Parsons attempted to run for mayor in 1995, but lost to Fernando.

In 2001, Parsons attempted to run for Congress, but earned less votes than the three leading candidates: Del de Guzman, Virgilio Farcon Jr. and Celso delos Angeles Jr. Parsons attempted to run for mayor once again in 2004, at times riding a horse during his campaign sorties, but lost to incumbent mayor Marides Fernando, Bayani's wife.

In 2006, Parsons expressed his intention to move to Luuk, his father's hometown in the province of Sulu, and run for congress in the province's second district.

== Personal life ==
Parsons was the founder and president of the Allied Forces of the Philippines Civilian Volunteers (AFPCIV), a Non-Governmental Organization (NGO) whose mission is focused on humanitarian response and anti-crime operations throughout the Philippines. On the morning of July 18, 2002, Parsons thwarted an attempted robbery by six men at his family home in Marikina, killing two of them and injuring another. On May 29, 2004, Parsons' newly-bought car was alleged to have been used in the non-fatal bombing of the house of Barangay San Roque chairman Benjamin Cruz earlier that day, leading to Parsons being briefly arrested, though prosecutor Linda Conus immediately ordered him released for further investigation.

Parsons was an advocate of responsible gun ownership and shared his expertise in tactical and defensive shooting. In his last years, he served as a consultant in the National Bureau of Investigations.

Parsons was also an active member of the Law Enforcers Riders Association of the Philippines.

== Death ==
Parsons died on May 10, 2020, due to heart attack caused by heat stroke in Tayabas, Quezon while on a motorcycle trip. He was 61.

== Filmography ==
=== Film ===
Year	Title	Role
1981	Legs Katawan Babae	
1983	JR	
1984	Condemned	
1987	Sparrow Unit: The Termination Squad	
1987	Mga Lihim ng Kalapati	
1988	Apat, Lima, Anim	
1988	Ambush	Ka Sendo
1988	Sgt. Ernesto 'Boy' Ybañez: Tirtir Gang	Sgt. Ernesto 'Boy' Ybañez
1988	Shoot to Kill: Boy Bicol ng Angeles	
1989	Sgt. Niñonuevo: The Fastest Gun Alive of WPD	Sgt. Mariano Niñonuevo
1989	Salisi Gang	
1989	Get Commander Jack Moro: Bangsa Moro Army	
1989	Baricuarto: Batang Cebu .45	
1989	Kailan.... Dapat Lumaban	
1989	UZI Brothers 9mm	
1989	Nazareno Apostol: Boy Ahas	
1990	Masikip Na ang Mundo Mo	Alexander Aguirre
1990	Walang Sinasanto ang Bala Ko	
1991	OXO VS Sigue-Sigue	
1991	Digos Massacre	
1992	Johnny Cuevas: Alyas Boy Susi	Johnny Cuevas
1992	Sgt. Ernesto Baliola: Tinik sa Batas	Sgt. Ernesto Baliola
1992	Arrest: Hold-up Gang	
1992	Turing Gesmundo, Kapitan Langgam	
1992	Itumba si Angel Delgado	
1993	Capt. Rassul Alih, Hindi Sayo ang Mindanao	Capt. Rassul Alih
1993	Parañaque Bank Robbery: The Joselito Joseco Story	
1993	Aguinaldo	Ka Simon
1996	Paracale Gang	
1997	Bala Para sa Katarungan	Lt. Rodel Vargas
2015	Hari at Alas: Akin ang Batas	

=== Television ===
Year	Title	Role	Notes
1988, 1995	Coney Reyes on Camera	Various roles	2 episodes
1991–1992	Agila		
2003	Magpakailanman	Himself	Episode: "Hinagpis ng Kamatayan"
2005	Bahay Mo Ba 'To	Kid	Episode: "Demolisyon Na Ito!"
2008	Ysabella	Barangay chairman	
2013	Pepito Manaloto	Lito	Guest
2016	We Love OPM: The Celebrity Sing-Offs	Himself	Guest
2017	FPJ's Ang Probinsyano	Fidel	Guest
2017	Live Jamming with Percy Lapid	Himself	Guest performer
2019	Bravo Executive Lounge	Himself	Guest performer Final performance before his death
