= Target: Sparrow Unit =

- Directed by: Ben "M7" Yalung
- Written by: Tony A. Calvento
- Produced by: Romy "M3" Yalung
- Starring: Ramon 'Bong' Revilla Jr.; Ronnie Ricketts; Debbie Miller; Sonny Parsons; E.R. Ejercito; Allan Bautista; Dick Israel; King Gutierrez
- Cinematography: Ernesto "Boy" Dominguez
- Edited by: Augusto Salvador
- Music by: Jun Latonio
- Production company: Cine Suerte
- Distributed by: Cine Suerte (Philippines); Davian International (international)
- Release date: August 14, 1987
- Running time: 95 minutes
- Country: Philippines
- Languages: Filipino; Tagalog
- Box office: ₱4 million

Target: Sparrow Unit (internationally released as Sparrow Unit: The Termination Squad) is a 1987 Filipino action film directed by Ben "M7" Yalung. It stars Ramon 'Bong' Revilla Jr., Ronnie Ricketts, Debbie Miller, Sonny Parsons, Dick Israel, King Gutierrez and E.R. Ejercito.

Ricketts won the PMPC Star Award for Best Supporting Actor.

== Plot ==
Young idealists form the liquidation squad of the left known as the Sparrow Unit, summarily executing the perceived enemies of the people until they are cornered and eventually defeated by government. The Sparrow Unit derived their name from sparrows, birds that can adapt in any environment.

== Cast ==
- Ramon 'Bong' Revilla Jr.
- Ronnie Ricketts
- Debbie Miller
- Sonny Parsons
- E.R. Ejercito
- Allan Bautista
- Dick Israel
- King Gutierrez
- Bomber Moran
- Vic Diaz
- Mario Escudero
- Romeo Rivera
- Robert Talabis
- Ernie Forte
- Fred Moro
- Jimmy Reyes
- Ernie David
- Johnny Vicar
- Jose Romulo
- Ernie Zarate
- Ver Pineda
- Connie Angeles
- Lucita Soriano
- Rey Tomenes
- Bebot David
- Lito Francisco
- Boy Mediavillo
- Dante Abadeza
- Boy Sta. Maria
- Joe Estrada

== Accolades ==
Group	Category	Name	Result
PMPC Star Awards for Movies	Best Supporting Actor	Ronnie Ricketts	Won

== See also ==
Other film depictions of the Sparrow Unit starring Ronnie Ricketts:

- Target: Maganto (1988)
- Ambush (1988)
- Alex Boncayao Brigade (1989)
