= Alex Boncayao Brigade =

1984–2000 urban assassination unit of the Philippine New People's Army

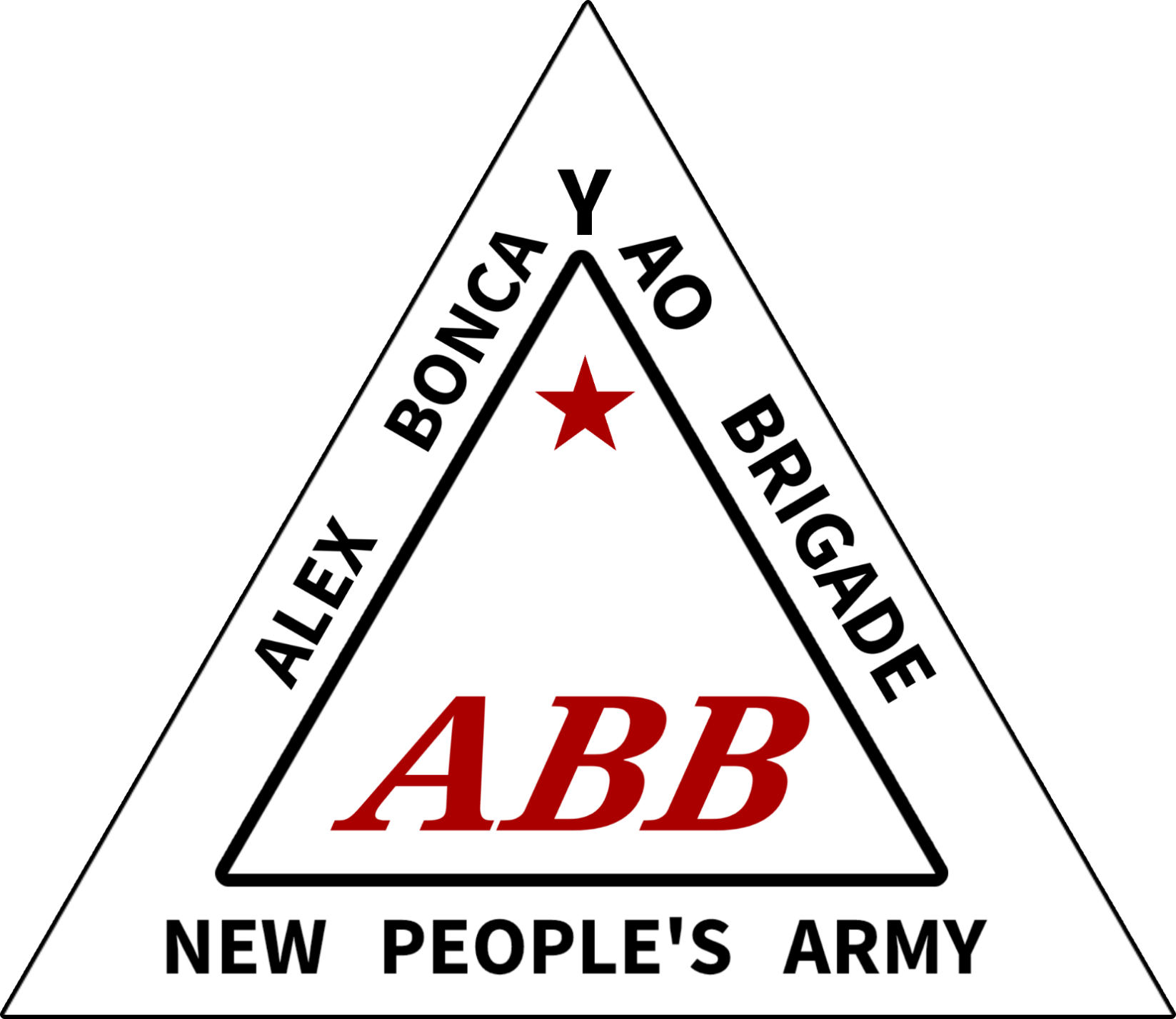
- Other name: ABB
- Leaders: Filemon Lagman; Nilo dela Cruz
- Founded: 1984
- Dissolved: 2000
- Split from: New People's Army
- Country: Philippines
- Active regions: Luzon, Visayas
- Ideology: Marxism–Leninism
- Political position: Far-left
- Size: 500

The Alex Boncayao Brigade (abbreviated as ABB; also known as the SPARU Unit) was the urban assassination unit of the New People's Army, the armed wing of the Communist Party of the Philippines. Organized in 1984, the unit broke away from the New People's Army as a consequence of a split in ideology during the 1990s. In 1997, the Alex Boncayao Brigade allied itself with the Revolutionary Proletarian Army, the armed wing of the Revolutionary Workers' Party.

== Background ==
The Alex Boncayao Brigade was established in May 1984 and was named after a labor leader killed by Philippine government security forces the year before. The brigade became especially active after the departure of then-President Ferdinand Marcos as a consequence of the People Power Revolution, and during the term of President Corazon Aquino.

In 1993, Filemon Lagman and several cadre of the Manila-Rizal regional committee of the Communist Party of the Philippines (CPP) broke away from the mainstream group, taking the Alex Boncayao Brigade with them. In a 1993 interview, Nilo dela Cruz stated that the organization had 100 members. He went on to explain that the group was striving to improve their knowledge of remote controlled explosives. He also mentioned that other than Leon's Red Scorpions, the military had not been able to capture a single Brigade member. Alfredo de Leon had broken away from the Brigade in 1991, and 14 Red Scorpion members were killed in 2002.

In 1994, Lagman was arrested in Quezon City, putting a damper on the brigade's activities. The ABB itself, headed by Nilo dela Cruz, would eventually split from Lagman in 1997 after an internal rift. Lagman would later give up the armed struggle and become a labor union organizer. He was assassinated in 2000, allegedly by members of his former revolutionary group.

Nilo dela Cruz, using the alias "Sergio Romero", was arrested that same year in Bulacan after crashing his car while being pursued by government intelligence agents. It would later be revealed that dela Cruz had allied the ABB with the Revolutionary Proletarian Army, forming the Revolutionary Proletarian Army – Alex Boncayao Brigade. This was not the first time dela Cruz had been arrested, or used an alias; in the 1970s he had been detained in the Youth Rehabilitation Center at Fort Bonifacio under the alias "Mario Saldaña". He had kept a low profile then and his true identity was never discovered. In 2003 it was reported that dela Cruz had "shifted from terrorist activities as leader of the ABB to organizing the labor forces of the Philippines into trade unions".

== Activities ==
The Alex Boncayao Brigade is credited with the assassinations of nearly 200 police officers from 1984 until 1993. In 1984, the ABB claimed responsibility for the assassination of Police General Tomas Karingal, Chief of the Quezon City Police Department. In 1989, they claimed responsibility for the assassination of United States Army Colonel James N. Rowe, who was serving as an adviser to the Philippine Army. In 1996, the ABB also claimed responsibility for the assassination of Philippine Constabulary Lt. Col. Rolando Abadilla, a former chief of the Metrocom Intelligence and Security Group during the Marcos dictatorship. As proof of the deed, they turned over Abadilla's wristwatch to a Catholic priest, Fr. Robert Reyes. In 2000, the group claimed responsibility for attacks against the Department of Energy in Manila and Shell Oil offices in the central Philippines in protest against rising oil prices. Consequently, the US government added the ABB to its Patriot Act Terrorist Exclusion List in 2001.

Terrorist incidents attributed to the Alex Boncayao Brigade in the Global Terrorism Database show that the majority of their acts are armed assault and assassinations. Their remaining acts are bombings, explosions and facility or infrastructure assault. During these acts, the ABB’s weapons of choice during much of the actions committed was that of the use of firearms and explosives.

Throughout these activities, most of the group’s funds came from the “extortion and intimidation” of wealthy citizens and successful business owners. The group called these funds “revolutionary taxes” or “protection payments”.

=== Peace talks ===
In 2000, Nilo dela Cruz of the ABB and Arturo Tabara, leader of the Revolutionary Proletarian Army, announced their intention to engage in peace talks with the government of Joseph Estrada; this resulted in a truce with the Philippine Army. On December 6, 2000, a peace agreement was signed by the Republic of the Philippines and RPMP/RPA/ABB with the foundation of shared desire for a peaceful settlement of the armed conflict. This in turn prompted a vehement condemnation from Filemon Lagman; in a press release he branded Tabara and dela Cruz "scoundrels masquerading as revolutionaries". Due to the Brigade’s negotiations with the government, the New People’s Army allegedly targeted their former partner. In 2002, a “Clarification Document” was signed and agreed upon in response to the issues raised on the substance within the 2000 agreement. The agreement signed is the model used for the 2019 peace talks between the government and local CPP–NPA–NDF wings.

== In popular culture ==
The ABB was a popular subject to depict in Filipino films during the 1980s, and was often referred to as the Sparrow Unit. Some examples include Target: Sparrow Unit (1987), Ambush (1988), Patrolman (1988), and Alex Boncayao Brigade (1989).

== See also ==
- List of military units named after people
