= Jess Lapid Jr. =

Filipino director and actor

- Born: Jesse Lloyd Flake Lapid; March 22, 1962 (age 64); Caloocan, Philippines
- Occupations: Actor, Film Director, Scuba Instructor, Underwater Director of Photography
- Years active: 1979–present
- Children: 6
- Parent(s): Jess Lapid Sr. Bella Flake-Lapid
- Family: Lito Lapid (cousin)

Jesse Lloyd Flake Lapid (born March 22, 1962), commonly known as Jess Lapid Jr., is a film and television actor, film and fight director, scuba course director of CMAS Philippines, and underwater director of photography.

More popularly known for his movie screen name Jess Lapid Jr., he is the son of actor Jess Lapid Sr. and Bella Flake-Lapid.

== Early life ==
Lapid was born on March 22, 1962, in Caloocan, Philippines to the late veteran actor Jess Lapid Sr. and Bella Flake-Lapid and nephew to Jose Lapid. He is the cousin of actor-politician Lito Lapid and uncle to Mark Lapid, an actor turned politician. His father was murdered when he was 6. Lapid decided to enter acting at the age of 17.

== Career ==
Lapid starred in movies such as Ang Bagong Kardong Kidlat (1980), Kaliwete Brothers (1981) with Efren Reyes Jr., Basagulero Ang Lover Ko (1981) with Myrna Castillo, Kapwa Simaron (1981), and Mga Pambato (1981) with Rudy Fernandez, Ace Vergel, and Phillip Salvador.

In 1993, Lapid received the Gawad Urian Award nomination for Best Supporting Actor in Lumayo Ka Man Sa Akin. Also, he received the Film Academy Award nomination for Best Supporting Actor in Lagalag, The Eddie Fernandez Story.

Lapid was the fight director of the movies Kadre (1997) starring Cesar Montano, and in Tapang sa Tapang (1997) starring cousin Lito Lapid. He was the director of the film Batas Militar (2006) starring nephew Mark Lapid and his wife Tanya Garcia.

Then Lapid was co-starred for GMA Network work with Rufa Mae Quinto, Wendell Ramos and Alfred Vargas in a TV series Marinara (2004), Maxene Magalona and Oyo Sotto in Saang Sulok ng Langit (2005) Marvin Agustin, Sheryl Cruz and former child actress Krystal Reyes in Mga Mata ni Anghelita (2007) and Marvin Agustin, Yasmien Kurdi and JC de Vera in Babangon Ako't Dudurugin Kita (2008). Then he works as guesting with drama actor Coco Martin in FPJ's Ang Probinsyano (2016) on ABS-CBN.

== Personal life ==
His daughter, Justine Lapid is a professional volleyball player.

His cousin, Lito Lapid is also a film and television actor.

== Hobby ==
In 1989, Lapid was certified by CMAS Japan as an Open Water Diver, an Advanced Diver in 1992, a Rescue Diver in 1993, and a 4-Star Dive Master in 1994. He started as an Assistant Instructor in 1995. In 1996, he was certified as 2-Star Instructor. In 2010, he became a 3-Star Instructor Trainer of CMAS Philippines. In 2015, he became a Course Director of CMAS Philippines.

== Filmography ==
=== Film ===
| Year | Title | Role | Note(s) | Ref(s). |
|---|---|---|---|---|
| 1970 | Shotgun Kid | | | Ref(s). |
| 1970 | Edgar Loves Vilma | | | |
| 1979 | Wasakin ang Sindikatu | | | |
| 1980 | Ang Bagong Kardong Kidlat | | | |
| 1981 | Kaliwete Brothers | | | |
| 1981 | Attack and Destroy | | | |
| 1981 | Legs Katawan Babae | | | |
| 1981 | Mga Pambato | | | |
| 1981 | Simaron | | | |
| 1981 | Batikan | | | |
| 1982 | Estranghero | | | |
| 1982 | Karding | | | |
| 1982 | Sgt. Pork & Capt. Beans | | | |
| 1983 | Sasabayan Kita sa Impiyerno | | | |
| 1983 | Commandos | | | |
| 1983 | Kristong Walang Krus | | | |
| 1983 | Aninong Bakal | | | |
| 1983 | Anak ng Sultan | | | |
| 1983 | Pugante | | | |
| 1984 | Kung Tawagin Siya'y Animal | | | |
| 1984 | Billy the Kid, the Sunshine Gid Plus the Never Mind Company | | | |
| 1984 | Billy the Kid and the Sunshine Gid | | | |
| 1985 | Marasigan | | | |
| 1985 | Jimbo | | | |
| 1985 | Manila Gang War | | | |
| 1988 | Raider Platoon | | | |
| 1988 | Sa Dulo ng Baril | Arnel | | |
| 1988 | Baril, Matalik Kong Kaibigan | | | |
| 1988 | Renegade Force | | | |
| 1989 | Walang Susuko | | | |
| 1990 | Durugin ng Bala si Peter Torres | | | |
| 1990 | Sgt. Miguel Carpio: Multiple Murder | | | |
| 1990 | Isang Milyon sa Ulo ni Cobra | | | |
| 1991 | Mayor Latigo: Ang Barakong Alkalde ng Baras | | | |
| 1992 | Lumayo Ka Man sa Akin | | | |
| 1992 | Shotgun Banjo | | | |
| 1992 | Paminsan-minsan | | | |
| 1992 | Boy Recto | Lupo Garcia | | |
| 1993 | Geron Olivar | | | |
| 1993 | Gascon... Bala ang Katapat Mo | | | |
| 1993 | Aguinaldo | | | |
| 1994 | Bawal Na Gamot | | | |
| 1994 | Massacre Files | | | |
| 1994 | Lagalag: The Eddie Fernandez Story | | | |
| 1994 | Lab Kita... Bilib Ka Ba? | | | |
| 1994 | Macario Durano | | | |

- Cordora: Lulutang Ka sa Sarili Mong Dugo (1992) - Ben Tumbling
- Epimaco Velasco: NBI (1994)
- Bukas Bibitayin si Itay (1995)
- Ikaw Pa Eh... Love Kita (1995)
- Hanggang sa Huling Bala (1995)
- Matinik Na Kalaban (1995)
- Costales (1995)
- Utol (1996)
- Bagsik ng Kamao (1997)
- Pusakal (1997)
- Tapatan ng Tapang (1997)
- Babangon ang Huling Patak ng Dugo (1997)
- Tapang sa Tapang (1997)
- Warfreak (1998)
- Ako'y Ibigin Mo... Lalaking Matapang (1999)
- Burador (Ang Babaing Sugo) (2000)
- Sgt. Isaias Marcos... Bawat Hakbang Panganib (2000)
- Mahal Kita... Kahit Sino Ka Pa! (2001)
- Dugong Aso: Mabuting Kaibigan, Masamang Kaaway (2001)
- Lapu-Lapu (2002) - Zula's Man
- When Eagles Strike (2003)
- Operation Balikatan (2003)
- Batas Militar (2006)
- Apoy sa Dibdib ng Samar (2006)
- Enteng Kabisote 3: Okay Ka, Fairy Ko: The Legend Goes On and On and On (2006)

=== Television ===
- Flordeluna (1978-1983)
- Pepeng Agimat (1999)
- Marinara (2004)
- Saang Sulok ng Langit (2005)
- Magpakailanman: The Jimmy and Cora Salalima Story (2006)
- Mga Mata ni Anghelita (2007)
- Babangon Ako't Dudurugin Kita (2008)
- FPJ's Ang Probinsyano (2016)
- Sigabo (2026)

== See also ==
- Lito Lapid
- Dante Varona
- Rey Malonzo
- Anthony Alonzo
- Sonny Parsons
