= People's Journal =

English-language daily tabloid newspaper in the Philippines

- Type: Daily newspaper
- Format: Tabloid
- Owner(s): Philippine Journalists, Inc.
- Editor-in-chief: Ma. Theresa Lardizabal
- Founded: December 7, 1978
- Political alignment: Centre-right
- Language: English
- Headquarters: Railroad St. cor 19th and 20th Sts., South Port Area, Manila, Philippines 1018
- Sister newspapers: People's Tonight; Manila Standard
- Website: Journal News Online

People's Journal is an English-language daily tabloid newspaper published by the Philippine Journalists, Incorporated (PJI). Augusto "Gus" Villanueva, its former editor-in-chief, and Antonio Friginal were founders of the company.

People's Journal, with its sister publications, tabloids People's Tonight and People's Taliba, magazines Women's Journal and Insider and now-defunct broadsheet Times Journal, is part of one of the country's "biggest daily newspaper publication group." People's Journal and People's Tonight were among the widest circulated daily tabloids.

== Augusto Villanueva ==
Augusto "Gus" Buenaventura Villanueva was the PJI Group of Publications editor-in-chief and publisher until his death on January 14, 2022, at age 83. He was also a leading sportswriter.

He worked first as a Manila Times sportswriter in 1955 at age 17, while he was a University of Santo Tomas (UST) student, before becoming a Times Journal editor in 1972. He was the president of the Philippine Sportswriter Association (PSA) in the 1970s and 1980s where he initiated the weekly PSA Forum.

He is credited for the popularization of ten-pin bowling. He later became the media relations officer of the Philippine Olympic Committee (POC).

== History ==
During its establishment on December 7, 1978, only newspapers owned by Marcos cronies were permitted to operate by the government since most of them were shut down after President Ferdinand Marcos declared nationwide martial law in September 1972. Former workers of the Philippines Herald, which was closed at that time, established the Philippine Journalists Inc. (PJI) under the management of the late Benjamin Romualdez, former First Lady Imelda Marcos' younger brother. PJI was allowed by the government to operate on October 21, 1972, with its flagship paper, Times Journal. Villanueva, a former Manila Times sportswriter, was one of its founding editors.

Inspired by New York Post, People's Journal was first launched as a broadsheet on December 7, 1978, with Villanueva, its co-founder, assigned as editor-in-chief and with the help of Vergel Santos, assigned as managing editor, and Friginal. Although with legitimacy, however, they were stopped by the Print Media Council due to lack of permit to print. Only with permit acquisition, they could relaunch the paper a week later. In 1979, Villanueva co-founded its sister newspaper, People's Tonight.

Content in newspapers were being censored by the Media Advisory Council at the start of martial law. According to Villanueva, the government "had somebody looking at our stories, a military man checking our stories."

Their headquarters were then located at the building now owned by The Philippine Star at Port Area, Manila. They later moved to the old Manila Chronicle building, later renamed Benpres Building, in Pasig City until their return to the Port Area (Times Journal Bldg., now Journal Bldg.) in 1977 with the acquisition of a new printing press.

Aside from People's Journal, Villanueva was also taking charge of publications People's Tonight (bilingual paper, in English and Tagalog, launched in 1979), Taliba (its Tagalog counterpart, launched in the early 1980s), and Insider and Women's Journal (launched upon re-acquisition in 2004, by that time, Times Journal already ceased its publication).

In the early 1980s, the paper increased its popularity with the feature of the comics of Carlo Caparas.

After the end of administration of Pres. Marcos, in 1986, all PJI's shares were sequestered by the Corazon Aquino administration's Presidential Commission on Good Government for the suspicions of ownership and being part of the ill-gotten wealth. This resulted to decrease of its sales and circulation since it focuses on government-related events. Majority of these were ordered by the Supreme Court to be released in 1991. The company was later returned to the owner's associates in 2004.

Meanwhile, upon the sequester, Villanueva and some former co-employees established its rival tabloid News Today. He became the head of the Journal Group again upon re-acquisition and served as its publisher and editor-in-chief until his death.

Journal Publications, Inc., the publisher of the tabloid, is currently owned by the Romualdez family, through Congressman Martin Romualdez, in which they also acquired the ownership of a broadsheet newspaper Manila Standard in 2010.

== Controversies ==
People's Journal's sister tabloid People's Tonight was criticized for their featured headlines in its March 13, 2022, issue that, according to the supporters of Vice President (and 2022 presidential aspirant) Leni Robredo, containing stories seems to be biased against her.

On May 6, 2022, Robredo's spokesperson Barry Gutierrez filed a cyber libel complaint before the Quezon City Prosecutor's Office, against six Journal Group staff over an April 21 Journal News Online (the paper's news website) article, which also appeared on People's Journal and People's Tonight, claiming Communist Party of the Philippines founder Jose Maria Sison was allegedly Robredo camp's campaign adviser. The claims, which Gutierrez described as false, were denied by both Robredo and Sison. Those sued for the violations of Republic Act 10175 and the Revised Penal Code included an article author and the [late former] editor-in-chief Villanueva, as well as news site owner PJI Web News Publishing, and Philippine Journalists Inc.

== See also ==
- Manila Standard
