= Ronnie Ricketts =

Filipino actor and film director

- Born: Ronald Naldo Ricketts; Philippines
- Occupations: Actor, film director, screenwriter, government official
- Years active: 1982–present
- Spouse: Mariz Ricketts
- Children: 2

Chairman of the Optical Media Board
- In office October 21, 2009 – January 29, 2016
- President: Gloria Macapagal Arroyo, Benigno Aquino III
- Preceded by: Edu Manzano
- Succeeded by: Anselmo Adriano

Ronald Naldo Ricketts, popularly known as Ronnie Ricketts, is a Filipino actor, scriptwriter, film director, line producer, and martial artist who is the former president of the Philippine Film Actors Guild, and former chairman of Optical Media Board (OMB), a government agency that regulates recording optical media in the Philippines.

== Film career ==
Ronnie Ricketts is a martial artist and was a ramp model before he entered the movie industry in the early 1980s. He was first noticed by RVQ's (Dolphy) film production as a potential action star.

He was introduced in the Dolphy-Nida Blanca film, My Heart Belongs to Daddy (1982), where he was paired with Maricel Soriano. He was being billed as the other love interest of Soriano in the film I Love You, I Hate You (1983), together with William Martinez, and The Graduates (1986) under Regal Films starring Snooky Serna and Gabby Concepcion.

He was cast in several Dolphy-Alma Moreno movies such as Good Morning, Professor (1982) and Crazy Professor (1985) with Aga Muhlach and Janice de Belen.

His movies were a blend of drama, comedy and action. He worked with other action stars that were also at the peak of their careers, Lito Lapid, Dante Varona and Bong Revilla. His unforgettable portrayal was with Revilla in the Imus Production's Sparrow Unit, where he won an award as Best Supporting Actor. He was nominated as Best Supporting Actor FAMAS Award in the film Target: Sparrow Unit (1987), and FAMAS Best Actor in the movies Tatak ng Isang Api (1989), and Isa-Isahin Ko Kayo (1990).

He landed lead roles in movies such as Uzi Brothers 9mm (1989) with Sonny Parsons, Target: Maganto (1989), Gapos Gang (1989), Baril Ko ang Uusig (1990), and Matira ang Matibay (1995) to name a few, some of which he did with his own movie outfit, Rocketts Productions. He had the chance to play opposite many leading ladies such as Beverly Vergel, Vina Morales, and his real life partner, Mariz.

Ricketts also co-starred in international action movies with Taiwanese actress Cynthia Khan in Ultimate Revenge (1995) and Angel on Fire (1995) and with American Actor Burton Richardson in One Percent Full (2007).

In 1994, Ricketts started producing films through Rocketts Productions. He was one of the youngest producers in tinsel town, who was able to produce films at reasonable budgets. The company produced films which he himself wrote, directed and acted in along with members of his family.

In one of his projects, Mano Mano (1995), he wrote the script, played the lead role, directed and produced. He was credited as Ronn-Rick as the director of the film. There were two sequels to the film - Mano Mano 2 (2001) and Mano Mano 3 (2004).

He has received the Fernando Poe, Jr. Memorial Award and a star in the Walk of Fame in Eastwood.

In 2013, he starred on the film The Fighting Chefs in which he was also its director. It served as his film comeback.

== As Optical Media Board (OMB) chairman ==
On October 21, 2009, former president Gloria Macapagal Arroyo, appointed Ricketts as the chairman of the Optical Media Board (OMB) following the resignation of television host Edu Manzano.

Ricketts has received several awards and recognitions with his staff for his performance as chairman of OMB, like Face of the Global Anti-Piracy of TFC-ABS-CBN, Certificate of Recognition on Anti-Piracy from the FAMAS, Intellectual Property Office of the Philippines-IPR Enforcement Champion, MMDA Achievement Award, SM Cinema Certificate of Recognition Association of Video Distributors in the Philippines (AVIDPHIL), Motion Picture Anti-Film Piracy Council, Certificate of Recognition Upholding Anti-Piracy, and Plaque of Recognition Against Piracy from PARI and AWIT Awards.

Ricketts agreed to direct and appear in an action film with Viva Films on condition that he would only shoot on weekends so as not to hamper his job as chairman of Optical Media Board. He has so far turned down offers to appear in shows on the three major networks - ABS-CBN 2, GMA 7 and TV5 - because his work with the OMB "has now become a passion."

=== 2010 Sky High raid, suspension, conviction and acquittal ===
On May 27, 2010, the OMB initiated a raid on the Sky High Marketing Corporation offices in Quiapo, Manila (the district where flea market stalls selling pirated copies of films, television shows and songs in CD [includes VCD] and DVD optical disc formats are common, designated by the Office of the United States Trade Representative [USTR] as "notorious piracy hotspot"), arresting three Chinese nationals. Pirated DVDs and VCDs contained in 127 boxes and two sacks were seized, and were brought to the OMB office as evidence. However, later that evening, Ricketts instructed the evidence's pull-out using the raided corporation's own truck, without an approved gate pass. No charges were filed against Sky High Marketing.

In August 2014, Ombudsman Conchita Carpio-Morales ordered the suspension of Ricketts, Executive Director Cyrus Paul Valenzuela, and three other OMB officials for their "neglect of duty". In June 2015, Prosecutor Janet Cabigas-Vejerano formally filed charges of graft against the five officials for their illicit returning of pirated works. Valenzuela later denied being part of the pullout, stating that he was included in the case only because of the presumption that he, as executive director, would know about every OMB operation. Despite the indictment, Ricketts continued to serve as chairman of OMB until January 2016, when the Sandiganbayan suspended him and three others (not including Valenzuela) from their positions while their trial is on hold and replaced by lawyer Anselmo B. Adriano.

On March 15, 2019, Ricketts, along with an OMB computer operator, was convicted of graft (Republic Act No. 3019) by the Sandiganbayan (Special Fourth Division), both were sentenced to prison for 6–8 years and perpetually disqualified from holding public office. He though immediately posted a bail bond after the decision. Three OMB's executive directors were acquitted due to insufficient evidence.

The Supreme Court's Second Division, in a decision promulgated on March 16, 2022 but only publicized on July 28, reversed the conviction of Ricketts which led to his acquittal; however, affirmed that of another. The court also lifted the hold departure order issued against Ricketts, with his cash bond released.

== Martial arts career ==
Ricketts started training martial arts at the age of 5 under the guidance and tutelage of his eldest brother the late Grand Master Christopher "Topher" Ricketts. He studied different forms of martial arts ranging from Okinawan karate, Budokan karate, Kūdō, Ngo Cho Kung-fu, boxing and then later transitioned to Filipino martial arts (FMA) where he was immersed to intensive trainings of Kali, Arnis and Sagasa Kickboxing.

He adapted the Sagasa method of Kali and Arnis that was developed by GM Christopher "Topher" Ricketts, a style that focused on powerful and direct strikes combined with boxing, kickboxing, striking, throwing and grappling. He was also personally trained by Lameco Eskrima founder GM Edgar Sulite.

As a lifelong martial artist Ricketts is an advocate of continuous learning where he shared during his Facebook live feed that he is also training modern day martial arts like Brazilian Jiu-jitsu (BJJ) and mixed martial arts (MMA).

Ricketts is a senior and one of the first generation member of Bakbakan International, a martial arts organization founded by his brother GM Topher Ricketts.

Currently Ricketts is continuing the legacy and preserving the style of the Sagasa martial arts system where he teaches it with an incorporation of modern-day martial arts to new generation of martial artists, MMA fighters, military and law enforcement agencies. He is also sharing self-defense and martial arts techniques in social media and internet streaming platforms through his YouTube channel Ricketts TV.

In 2004, Ricketts, Grand Master Topher Ricketts and Punong Guro Bruce Ricketts were given recognition by the US and Philippine Special Forces - Joint Task Force after sharing combative lessons to Philippine and American soldiers.

== Filmography ==
=== Film ===
Year	Title	Role
1982	My Heart Belongs to Daddy	
1982	Good Morning, Professor	
1983	I Love You, I Hate You	Julian
1983	Love Birds	
1984	Sa Hirap at Ginhawa	Joey
1985	Heated Vengeance	soldier
1985	The Crazy Professor	Marlo
1986	John & Marsha '86: TNT sa Amerika	
1986	The Graduates	
1986	I Love You Mama, I Love You Papa	Gordon
1986	Bodyguard: Masyong Bagwisa Jr.	Roy
1986	Agaw Armas	
1986	Nakagapos Na Puso	Leo Lozano
1986	Payaso	
1987	Kamandag ng Kris (Kris Commando)	Lt. Raoul Basco
1987	Cabarlo	
1987	Target: Sparrow Unit	Jose
1987	Mga Agila ng Arkong Bato	
1987	The Rookies and the Mighty Kids	
1988	Dongalo Massacre	
1988	Target... Maganto	Lt. Col. Romeo Maganto
1988	Urban Terrorist	
1988	Tumayo Ka't... Lumaban	Crisanto
1988	Ambush	Ka Mario
1988	Sgt. Victor Magno: Kumakasa Kahit Nag-iisa	Sgt. Victor Magno
1989	Alex Boncayao Brigade	Romy
1989	Tatak ng Isang Api	Geron
1989	Gapos Gang (Robinhood ng Quiapo)	Bobot Versoza
1989	Uzi Brothers 9mm	Tom
1989	Black Sheep Baby	
1989	My Darling Domestic (Greyt Eskeyp)	
1990	Kakampi Ko ang Diyos	Waldo
1990	Iisa-Isahin Ko Kayo!	
1990	Baril Ko ang Uusig	Ronquillo
1991	Junior Elvis: Nakaukit Na ang Lapida Mo	
1991	Anak ng Dagat	Guiller
1991	Kumukulong Dugo	Hector
1991	Ganti ng Api	Elias
1992	Zhi Fa Wei Long	Billy
1992	True Confessions (Evelyn, Myrna, & Margie)	Lester
1992	Aguila at Guerrero: Droga Terminators	Lt. Guerrero
1992	Dalawa Man ang Buhay Mo, Pagsasabayin Ko	Robert
1992	Basagulero	Berto
1992	Boy Recto	Restituto "Boy Recto"
1993	Alejandro "Diablo" Malubay	Alex Malubay
1993	Ikaw Lang	Dalton
1993	Pambato	Rudy
1993	Jesus Calderon, Maton	Jesus Calderon
1994	Maglulupa Man Ako!	Lando
1994	Batang Lansangan	Rodrigo
1995	Matira ang Matibay	Boyet
1995	Matinik Na Kalaban	Sgt. Mateo Torres
1995	Gen. Tapia, sa Nagbabagang Lupa	Gen. Tapia
1995	Ultimate Revenge	
1995	Angel on Fire	Boyet
1995	Mano Mano*	
1995	Huwag Mong Isuko ang Laban	David Mensehas
1996	Madaling Mamatay, Mahirap Mabuhay*	Alex
1996	Kahit sa Bala Kakapit Ako	Efren
1997	Hawak Ko Buhay Mo*	Alex
1997	Wala Ka ng Puwang sa Mundo*	Miguel
1997	Ilaban Mo Bayan Ko: The Obet Pagdanganan Story	Ka Vicky
1997	Boy Buluran*	Boy Buluran
1997	Kamandag Ko ang Papatay Sa'yo	Rodel
1998	Anting-Anting	
1998	My Guardian Debil	Nato
1998	May Sayad*	Verano
1999	Desperado, Bahala Na ang Itaas	
1999	Ang Boyfriend Kong Pari*	Father Ed de Vera
2001	Mano Mano 2: Ubusan ng Lakas*	Aldo
2003	Dayo*	
2003	Utang ng Ama	Director (Uncredited)
2004	Mano Mano 3: Arnis the Lost Art*	
2005	Uno	Niko
2006	Lagot Ka sa Kuya Ko*	
2007	One Percent Full	
2013	The Fighting Chefs*	Master Chef
2019	Exit Point*	Capt. Wilfredo Ocampo
2020	I, Will: The Doc Willie Ong Story*	—N/a

*Written and directed by Ricketts under the name Ronn Rick.

=== Television ===
- 1985 - Mother Studio Presents
- 1986 - Herederos
- 1987 - Lovingly Yours, Helen
- 1988 - Squad 13
- 1988 - Ang Tabi Kong Mamaw
- 1988 - Agila
- 1989 - Maricel Drama Special
- 1990 - Valiente
- 1991 - Maalaala Mo Kaya
- 1993 - GMA Telesine Specials
- 1995 - Mikee
- 1995 - Haybol Rambol
- 1997 - GMA True Stories
- 1998 - Calvento Files
- 1999 - !Oka Tokat
- 1999 - Kapag May Katwiran, Ipaglaban Mo!
- 2000 - Pintados
- 2005 - Magpakailanman
- 2006 - Kamao
- 2007 - Asian Treasures
- 2008 - Zaido: Pulis Pangkalawakan
- 2008 - Codename: Asero
- 2010 - True Confessions
- 2013 - Tunay Na Buhay
- 2014 - Dream Dad
- 2015 - Sabado Badoo
- 2017 - Eat Bulaga - Jackpot N Poy
- 2017 - The Lola's Beautiful Show
- 2018 - It's Showtime - Magpasikat judge with wife Mariz Ricketts
- 2019 - Tonight with Arnold Clavio
- 2019 - Moments
- 2019 - Wowowin
- 2021 - Ang Probinsyano
- 2025 - Mga Batang Riles
