= Manila Standard =

Broadsheet newspaper in the Philippines

- Defining the news

- Front page dated June 16, 2018
- Type: Newspaper
- Format: Broadsheet
- Owner(s): Philippine Manila Standard Publishing, Inc.
- Founder: Rod Reyes
- Publisher: Rolando G. Estabillo
- President: Philip Romualdez
- Managing editor: Joyce Pangco Pañares
- News editor: Virgilio Galvez
- Opinion editor: Honor Blanco Cabie
- Photo editor: Lino M. Santos
- Founded: 1987 (Manila Standard); 1999 (Today); 2005 (Manila Standard Today, merged); 2015 (The Standard); 2016 (Manila Standard) (2nd era)
- Political alignment: Centre-right
- Language: English
- Headquarters: 6/F, Universal RE Building, 106 Paseo de Roxas Avenue cor. Perea Street, Legaspi Village, Makati, Metro Manila, Philippines
- City: Manila
- Country: Philippines
- Sister newspapers: People's Journal
- Website: manilastandard.net

The Manila Standard is a broadsheet newspaper in the Philippines which, as of 2017, is owned by the Romualdez family. The Romualdezes, through incumbent Rep. Martin Romualdez, also own Journal Publications, Inc., the owner of tabloid papers People's Journal and People's Tonight.

Initially established as the Manila Standard in 1987, it merged with another newspaper, Today, on March 6, 2005, and became the Manila Standard Today (MST). In 2015, the newspaper renamed itself as The Standard (temporarily The New Standard), before reverting to its original name in 2016.

== History ==
The logo used from 2005 to 2015 as Manila Standard Today

The Manila Standard was founded on February 11, 1987. The offices were then located at the bustling Ayala Avenue in the Makati CBD.

In 1989, the group of Andres Soriano III bought out the Elizalde group and renamed the company Kagitingan Publications and relocated the offices in the Port Area, Manila.

In June 1991, the group of businessman Alfonso Yuchengco bought into the company and spun off the publishing company. It was incorporated as Kamahalan Publishing Corporation. Kagitingan Publications was renamed Kagitingan Printing Press Inc., which continues to print the New Standard.

In 1997, businessman Enrique K. Razon Jr., chairman and president of the International Container Terminal Services Inc., acquired the shares of the Yuchengcos and bought out the Soriano group to become the sole owner of Kamahalan Publishing Corporation and Kagitingan Printing Press Inc.

Victor Agustin took over as chairman of the Editorial Board in 2008. Under his term, the company formally adopted an advocacy for the environment.

In 2010, just as the Aquino administration took the reins of power, ownership of the Manila Standard Today changed hands again. This time, the Razon group sold its interest to the Romualdez group as Razon established Bloomberry Resorts & Hotels Corporation, owner of the Solaire Resort & Casino.

The newspaper once again was relaunched as The Standard, featuring a tallboy broadsheet format. The format is bigger than tabloids and smaller than newspapers, with pictures as the main inset of the front page. The new format was first implemented in the weekend issues before the full makeover happened in the weekday issues since February 23, 2015.

The Standard was named as the Newspaper of the Year during the 2015 Rotary Club of Manila Journalism Awards for its scoops on hot button issues, like the Mamasapano incident and the Bangsamoro Basic Law payola issues.

On July 25, 2016, the paper reverted to its broadsheet format, and it was renamed as the Manila Standard, the newspaper's original brand name in time for President Rodrigo Duterte's first State of the Nation Address.

== Columnists ==
OPINION, ACTIVE:

- Emil P. Jurado, "To The Point"
- Eric Jurado, "From Where I Stand"
- Dean Antonio La Vina, "Eagle Eyes"
- Adelle Chua, "Chasing Happy" and "Long Story Short"
- Dr. Jenny Ortuoste, "Pop Goes the World"
- Elizabeth Angsioco, "Power Point"
- Jonathan de la Cruz, "Crossroads"
- Cong. Danilo Suarez, "Over Sight"
- Florencio Fianza, "Duty Calls"
- Erwin Tulfo, "Point of Impact"
- Charlie V. Manalo, "Naked Thought"
- Orlando Oxales, "Open Thoughts"
- Alejandro del Rosario, "Back Channel"
- Lito Banayo, "So I See"
- Rod P. Kapunan, "Backbencher"
- Tony Lopez, "Virtual Reality"
- Pecier Decierdo, "Sounds of Science"
- Rudy Romero, "Business Class"
- Ernesto M. Hilario, "About Town"
- Gary Olivar, "Formation"
- Tranquil Salvador III, "Footnotes"
- "Everyman" - various including Joel Vega, Dr Amerlon Enriquez, Alex Alcasid, Rika Alcasid

BUSINESS

- Ray Eñano
- "Green Light" - various including Bienvenido Balotro, Jonna Baquillas, Arnel Onesimo Uy

ENTERTAINMENT AND LIFESTYLE

- Joyce Babe Pañares, "The Joyce of Eating"
- Bob Zozobrado, "Mercury Rising"
- Desiree Carlos, "Pet Tales"
- Alwin Ignacio, "Arias"
- Nickie Wang, "Very Wang"
- Yugel Losorata, "Touchbass"
- Joseph Peter Gonzales, "Shticks"
- Glaiza Lee, "Glazing Life"
- Joba Botana, "Job Well Done"
- Kate Adajar, "Random Talk"

SPORTS

- Dr Jenny Ortuoste, "The Hoarse Whisperer" (horseracing)

MOTORING

- Andy Sevilla, "Back on Track"

OPINION, INACTIVE:

- Rita Linda V. Jimeno, "Out of the Box"
- Horace Templo, "Filipino Pensioner"
- Pastor Apollo Quiboloy, "Plumbline"
