= List of songs recorded by Collective Soul =

Collective Soul are an American rock band originally formed in Stockbridge, Georgia, and now based in Atlanta. They have released nine studio albums.

== Songs ==
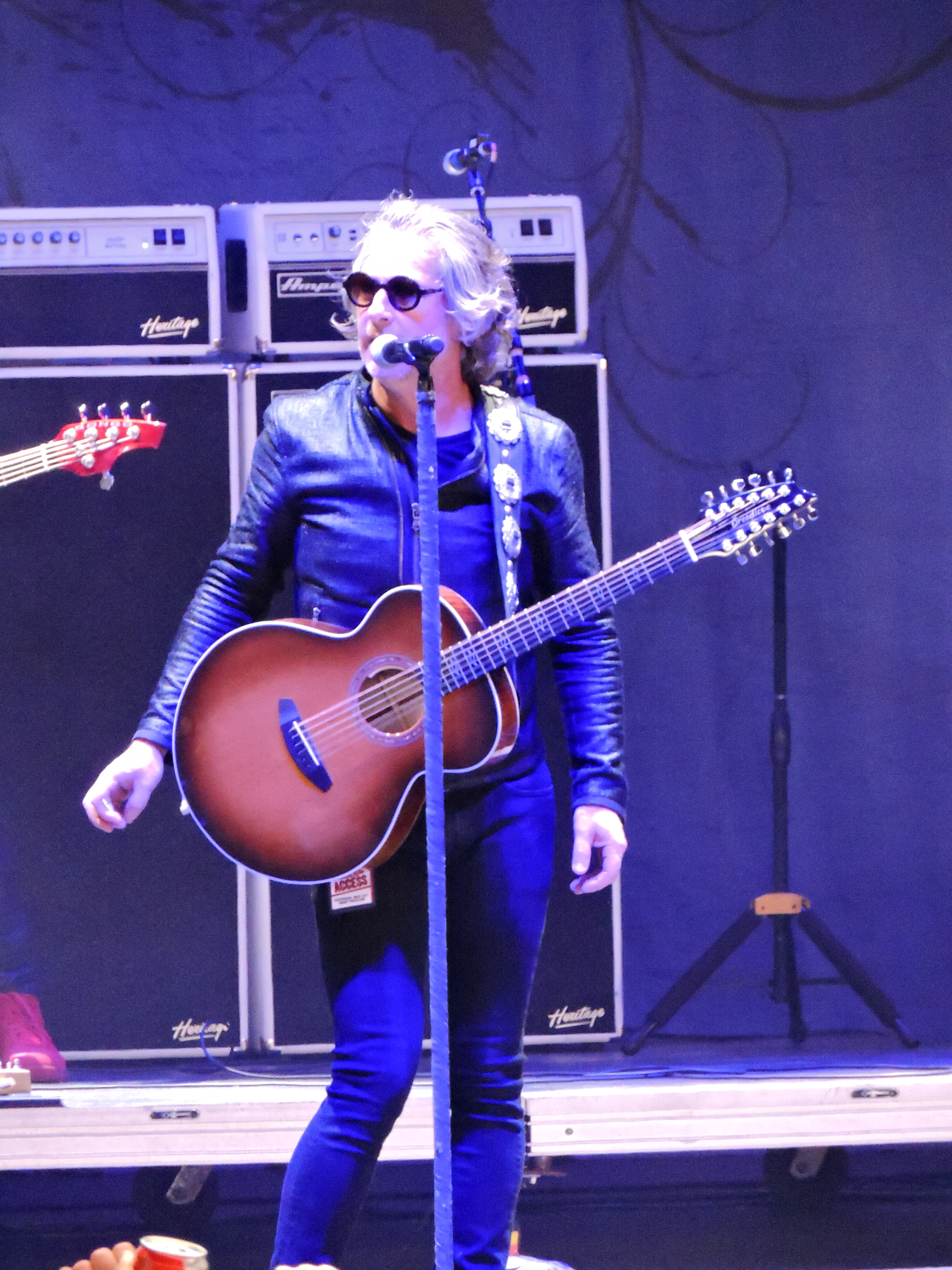
Frontman Ed Roland has written or co-written the majority of the band's songs.

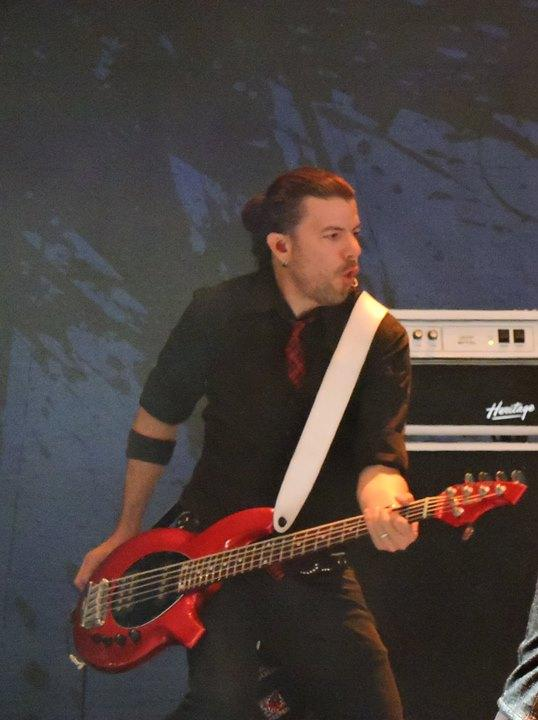
Bassist Will Turpin has co-written two of the band's songs.

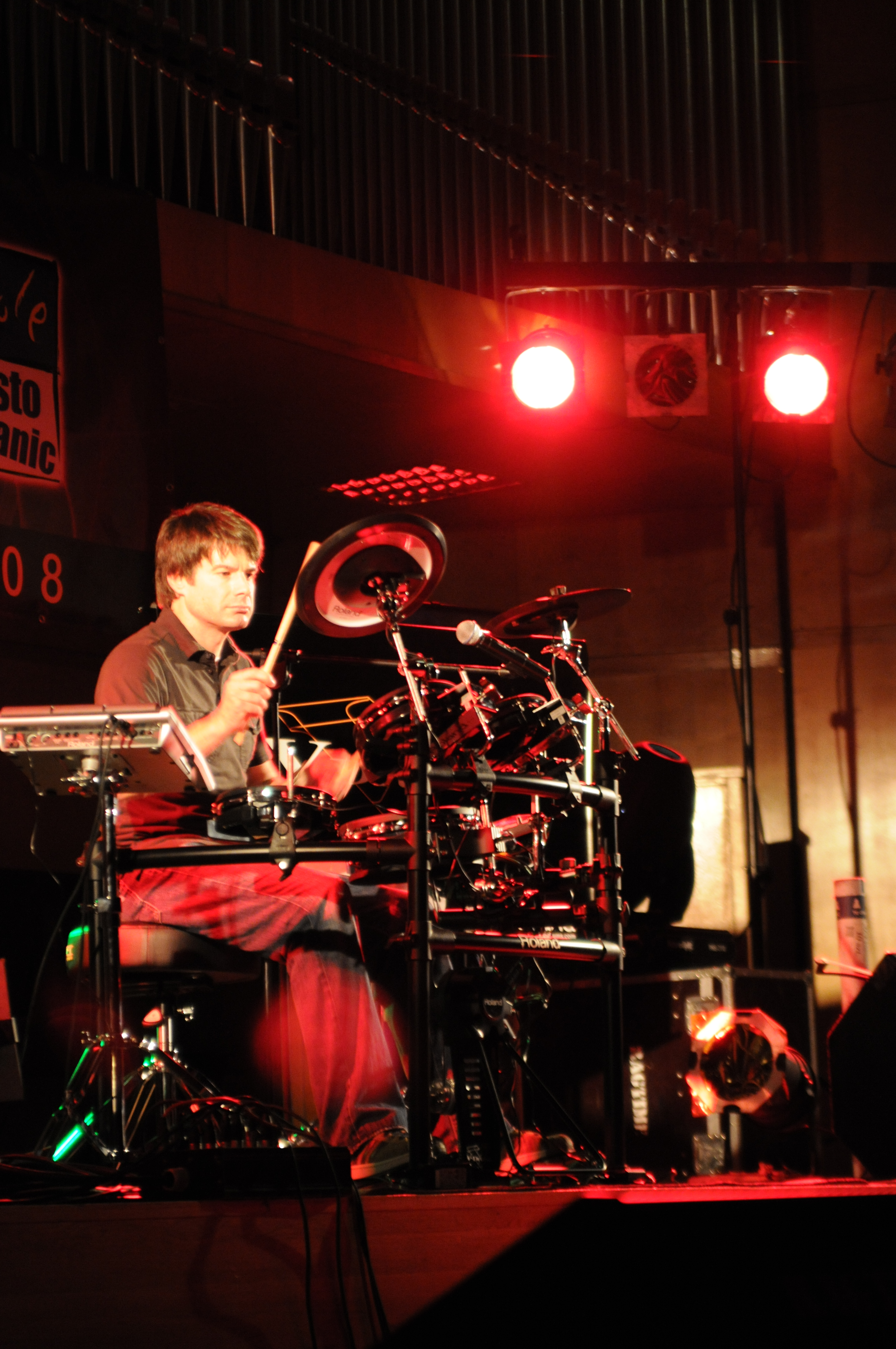
Drummer Johnny Rabb, who began touring with the band in 2012, made his recording debut with See What You Started by Continuing (2015).

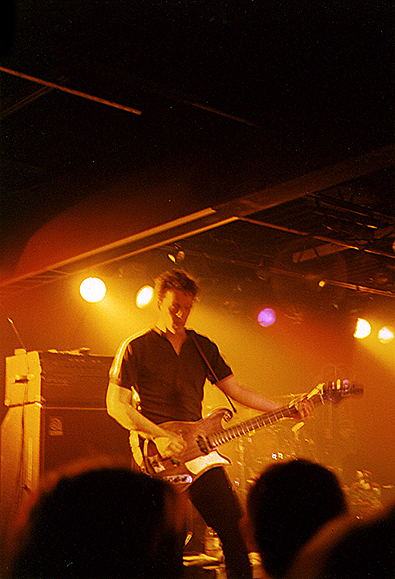
Morphine frontman Mark Sandman wrote "You Speak My Language," originally featured on 1993's Good. Collective Soul recorded their cover version for 2000's Blender, released a year after Sandman's death.

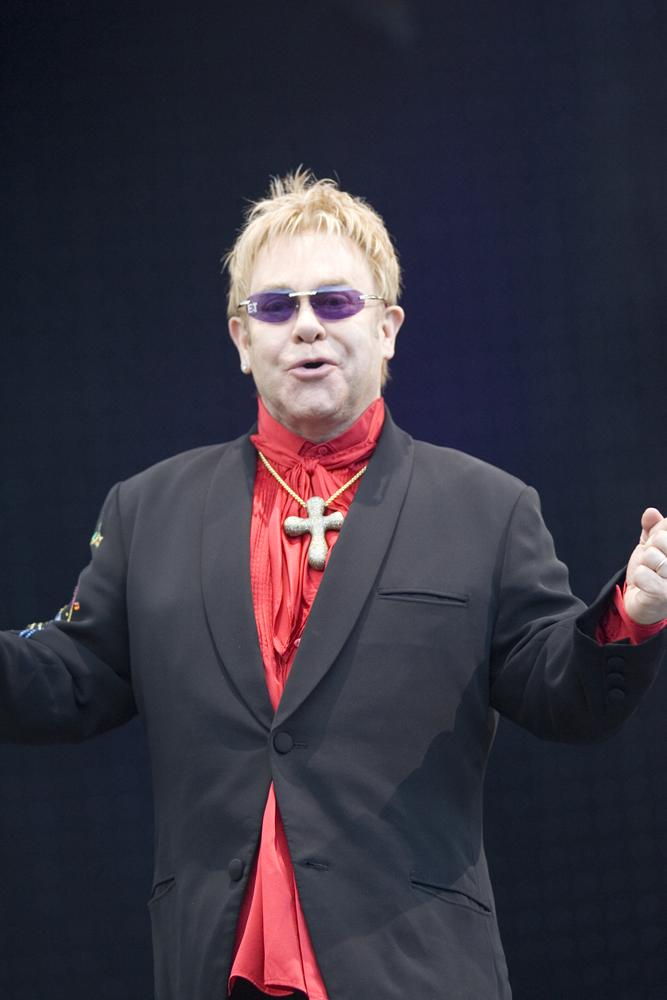
Elton John provides guest vocals and piano on "Perfect Day."

Key
†	Indicates song released as a single
‡	Indicates song written solely by Ed Roland

Song	Writer(s)	Release	Year	Ref.
"10 Years Later"	Ed Roland ‡	Blender	2000	
"Adored"	Ed Roland ‡	Afterwords	2007	
"After All"	Ed Roland ‡	Blender	2000	
"All"	Ed Roland ‡	Hints Allegations and Things Left Unsaid	1993	
"All That I Know" †	Ed Roland ‡	Afterwords	2007	
"Almost You"	Ed Roland ‡	Shine (Australian Single)	1993	
"Am I Getting Through"	Ed Roland ‡	See What You Started by Continuing	2015	
"AYTA" †	Ed Roland ‡	See What You Started by Continuing	2015	
"Back Again"	Ed Roland ‡	Half & Half	2020	
"Bearing Witness"	Ed Roland ‡	Afterwords	2007	
"Beautiful World"	Ed Roland ‡	Hints Allegations and Things Left Unsaid	1993	
"Better Now" †	Ed Roland; Dexter Green	Youth	2004	
"Big Sky"	Ed Roland ‡	Blood	2019	
"Blame" †	Ed Roland ‡	Disciplined Breakdown	1997	
"Bleed"	Ed Roland ‡	Collective Soul	1995	
"Blue Christmas"	Billy Hayes; Jay W. Johnson	Various	1995	
"Boast"	Ed Roland ‡	Blender	2000	
"Breathe" †	Ed Roland ‡	Hints Allegations and Things Left Unsaid	1993	
"Burn"	Ed Roland ‡	Home (Bonus track)	2006	
"Burning Bridges"	Ed Roland ‡	Hints Allegations and Things Left Unsaid	1993	
"Changed"	Ed Roland ‡	Blood	2019	
"Collection of Goods"	Ed Roland ‡	Collective Soul	1995	
"Compliment"	Ed Roland; Dean Roland	Dosage	1999	
"Confession"	Ed Roland ‡	See What You Started by Continuing	2015	
"Contagious" †	Ed Roland ‡	See What You Started by Continuing	2015	
"Counting the Days" †	Ed Roland ‡	Youth	2004	
"Crowded Head"	Ed Roland ‡	Disciplined Breakdown	1997	
"Crown"	Ed Roland ‡	Dosage	1999	
"Crushed"	Ed Roland ‡	Blood	2019	
"Dandy Life"	Ross Childress	Dosage	1999	
"December" †	Ed Roland ‡	Collective Soul	1995	
"Dig"	Ed Roland ‡	Collective Soul	2009	
"Disciplined Breakdown"	Ed Roland ‡	Disciplined Breakdown	1997	
"Energy"	Ed Roland ‡	Seven Year Itch	2001	
"Everything"	Ed Roland ‡	Disciplined Breakdown	1997	
"Feels Like (It Feels Alright)"	Ed Roland ‡	Youth	2004	
"Forgiveness"	Ed Roland ‡	Disciplined Breakdown	1997	
"Full Circle"	Ed Roland ‡	Disciplined Breakdown	1997	
"Fuzzy"	Ed Roland ‡	Collective Soul	2009	
"Gel" †	Ed Roland ‡	Collective Soul	1995	
"General Attitude"	Ed Roland ‡	Youth	2004	
"Generate"	Ed Roland ‡	Dosage	1999	
"Georgia Girl"	Ed Roland ‡	Afterwords	2007	
"Giving"	Ed Roland ‡	Disciplined Breakdown	1997	
"Good Morning After All"	Ed Roland ‡	Afterwords	2007	
"Good Place to Start" †	Ed Roland ‡	Blood	2019	
"Goodnight, Good Guy"	Ed Roland ‡	Hints Allegations and Things Left Unsaid	1993	
"Happiness"	Ed Roland ‡	Blender	2000	
"Heart to Heart"	Ed Roland ‡	Collective Soul	2009	
"Heaven's Already Here"	Ed Roland ‡	Hints Allegations and Things Left Unsaid	1993	
"Heavy" †	Ed Roland ‡	Dosage	1999	
"Him"	Ed Roland ‡	Youth	2004	
"Hollywood" †	Ed Roland; Joel Kosche	Afterwords	2007	
"Home"	Ed Roland; Dexter Green	Youth	2004	
"How Do You Love" †	Ed Roland ‡	Youth	2004	
"Hurricane" †	Ed Roland ‡	See What You Started by Continuing	2015	
"Hymn for My Father"	Ed Roland ‡	Collective Soul	2009	
"I Don't Need Anymore Friends"	Joel Kosche	Afterwords	2007	
"In a Moment"	Ed Roland ‡	Hints Allegations and Things Left Unsaid	1993	
"In Between"	Ed Roland ‡	Disciplined Breakdown	1997	
"Jealous Guy"	John Lennon	Working Class Hero: A Tribute to John Lennon	1995	
"Let Her Out"	Ed Roland ‡	Half & Half	2020	
"Life"	Ed Roland ‡	See What You Started by Continuing	2015	
"Lighten Up"	Ed Roland ‡	Collective Soul	2009	
"Link"	Ed Roland ‡	Disciplined Breakdown	1997	
"Listen" †	Ed Roland ‡	Disciplined Breakdown	1997	
"Love"	Ed Roland ‡	Collective Soul	2009	
"Love Lifted Me"	Ed Roland ‡	Hints Allegations and Things Left Unsaid	1993	
"Maybe"	Ed Roland ‡	Disciplined Breakdown	1997	
"Memoirs of 2005"	Ed Roland ‡	See What You Started by Continuing	2015	
"My Days"	Ed Roland ‡	Collective Soul	2009	
"Needs"	Ed Roland ‡	Dosage	1999	
"Never Here Alone"	Ed Roland ‡	Afterwords	2007	
"New Vibration"	Ed Roland ‡	Afterwords	2007	
"Next Homecoming" †	Ed Roland ‡	Seven Year Itch	2001	
"No More, No Less" †	Ed Roland ‡	Dosage	1999	
"Not the One"	Ed Roland ‡	Dosage	1999	
"Now's the Time"	Ed Roland ‡	Blood	2019	
"Now You've Got Me Drinkin'"	Ed Roland ‡	From the Group Up (Hidden track)	2005	
"Observation of Thoughts"	Ed Roland ‡	Blood	2019	
"Opera Star"	Neil Young	Half & Half	2020	
"Over Me"	Ed Roland ‡	Blood	2019	
"Over Tokyo"	Ed Roland ‡	Blender	2000	
"Peace, Love & Understanding"	Nick Lowe	Free digital download	2015	
"Perfect Day" †	Ed Roland ‡	Blender	2000	
"Perfect to Stay"	Ed Roland ‡	Youth	2004	
"Persuasion"	Ed Roland ‡	Dosage (Japanese bonus track)	1999	
"Persuasion of You"	Ed Roland ‡	Afterwords	2007	
"Porch Swing"	Ed Roland ‡	Blood	2019	
"Precious Declaration" †	Ed Roland ‡	Disciplined Breakdown	1997	
"Pretty Donna"	Ed Roland ‡	Hints Allegations and Things Left Unsaid	1993	
"Reach"	Ed Roland ‡	Hints Allegations and Things Left Unsaid	1993	
"Reunion"	Ed Roland ‡	Collective Soul	1995	
"Right As Rain" †	Ed Roland ‡	Blood	2019	
"Run" †	Ed Roland ‡	Dosage	1999	
"Satellite"	Ed Roland ‡	Youth	2004	
"Scream"	Ed Roland ‡	Hints Allegations and Things Left Unsaid	1993	
"She Does"	Ed Roland ‡	Collective Soul	2009	
"She Gathers Rain"	Ed Roland ‡	Collective Soul	1995	
"She Said" †	Ed Roland ‡	Scream 2: Music from the Dimension Motion Picture	1998	
"Shine" †	Ed Roland ‡	Hints Allegations and Things Left Unsaid	1993	
"Simple"	Ed Roland; Ross Childress	Collective Soul	1995	
"Sister Don't Cry"	Ed Roland ‡	Hints Allegations and Things Left Unsaid	1993	
"Skin"	Ed Roland ‡	Blender	2000	
"Slow"	Ed Roland; Dean Roland	Dosage	1999	
"Smashing Young Man" †	Ed Roland ‡	Collective Soul	1995	
"Smile"	Ed Roland ‡	Half & Half	2020	
"Staring Down" †	Ed Roland ‡	Collective Soul	2009	
"That's All Right"	Arthur Crudup	Collective Soul (Japanese bonus track)	1995	
"The Bugaloos"	Norman Gimbel; Charles Fox	Saturday Morning: Cartoons' Greatest Hits	1995	
"The One I Love"	Bill Berry; Peter Buck; Mike Mills; Michael Stipe	Half & Half	2020	
"The World I Know" †	Ed Roland; Ross Childress	Collective Soul	1995	
"Them Blues" †	Ed Roland ‡	Blood	2019	
"There's a Way"	Ed Roland; Dexter Green	Youth	2004	
"This" †	Ed Roland ‡	See What You Started by Continuing	2015	
"Tradition"	Ed Roland ‡	See What You Started by Continuing	2015	
"Tremble for My Beloved" †	Ed Roland ‡	Dosage	1999	
"Turn Around"	Ed Roland ‡	Blender	2000	
"Under Heaven's Skies"	Ed Roland ‡	Youth	2004	
"Understanding"	Ed Roland; Dean Roland; Joel Kosche; Will Turpin	Collective Soul	2009	
"Untitled"	Ed Roland ‡	Collective Soul	1995	
"Vent" †	Ed Roland ‡	Blender	2000	
"Wasting Time" †	Ed Roland ‡	Hints Allegations and Things Left Unsaid	1993	
"Welcome All Again" †	Ed Roland ‡	Collective Soul	2009	
"What I Can Give You"	Ed Roland ‡	Afterwords	2007	
"When the Water Falls"	Ed Roland ‡	Collective Soul	1995	
"Where the River Flows" †	Ed Roland ‡	Collective Soul	1995	
"Why"	Ed Roland ‡	Breathe single (Australian B-side)	1994	
"Why, Pt. 2" †	Ed Roland ‡	Blender	2000	
"Without Me"	Ed Roland ‡	See What You Started by Continuing	2015	
"You" †	Ed Roland; Dean Roland; Joel Kosche; Will Turpin	Collective Soul	2009	
"You Speak My Language"	Mark Sandman	Blender	2000	
"Youth"	Ed Roland ‡	From the Ground Up	2005	

=== Unreleased ===
In a November 2015 interview, Will Turpin revealed that about "three or four" songs would go unreleased per album.

Song	Writer(s)	Notes	Ref.
"Tell"	Ross Childress	Recorded during the Dosage sessions.	

== See also ==
- Collective Soul discography
