= Collective Soul discography =

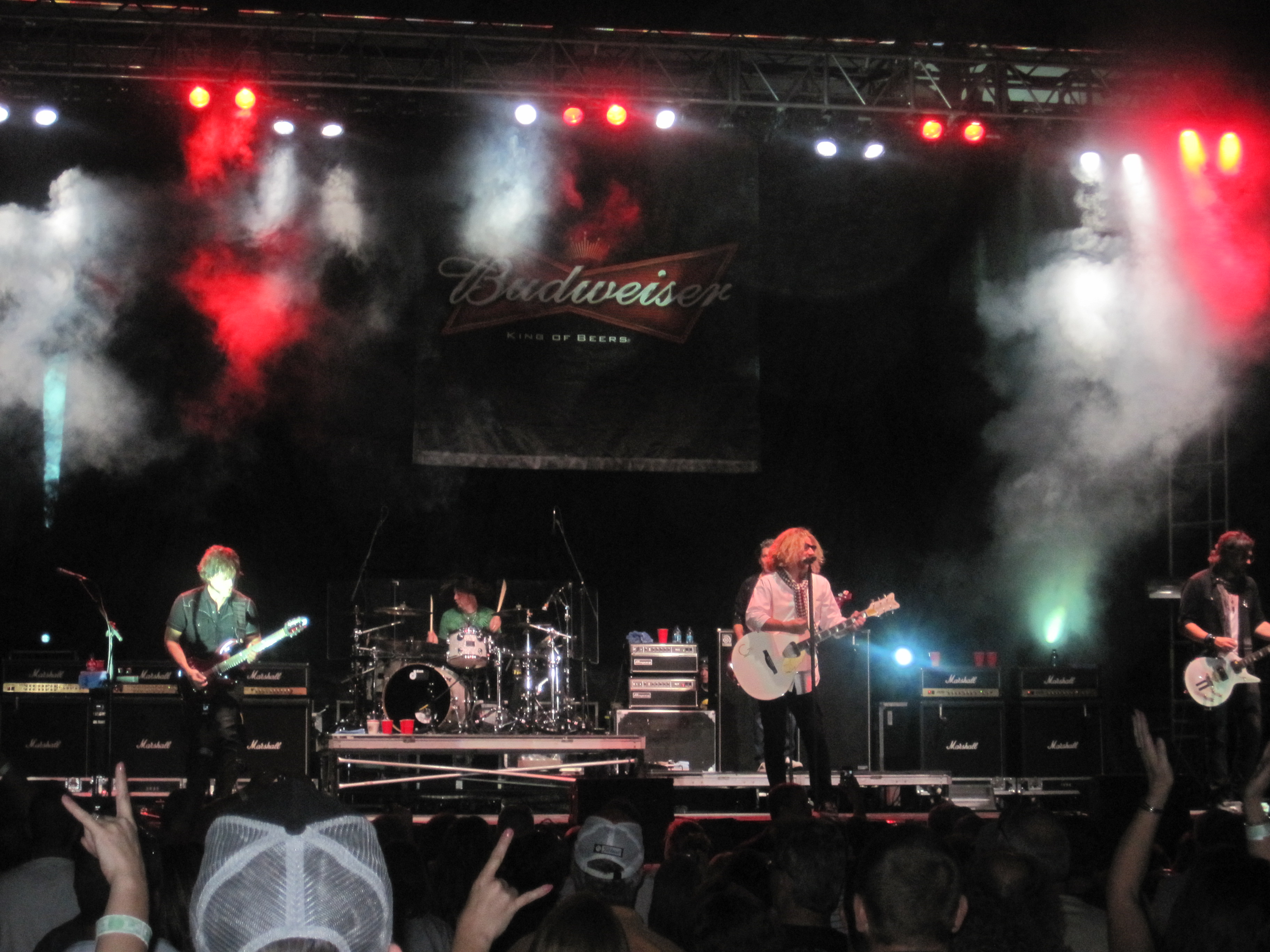
- Studio albums: 13
- Extended plays: 2
- Live albums: 2
- Compilation albums: 1

The discography of American rock band Collective Soul consists of 13 studio albums, three live albums, one compilation album, and two extended plays, in addition to numerous singles and music videos.

== Albums ==
=== Studio albums ===
Year	Album details	Peak chart positions						Certifications (sales thresholds)
Year	Album details	US	US Ind.	US Alt.	AUS	CAN	NZ	Certifications (sales thresholds)
1994	Hints Allegations and Things Left Unsaid: Released: March 22, 1994; Label: Atlantic; Formats: CD, CS, LP	15	—	—	57	5	46	RIAA: 2× Platinum; CAN: 5× Platinum
1995	Collective Soul: Released: March 14, 1995; Label: Atlantic (#82745); Formats: CD, CS, LP	23	—	—	23	9	1	RIAA: 3× Platinum; ARIA: Gold; MC: 8× Platinum; RMNZ: Platinum
1997	Disciplined Breakdown: Released: March 11, 1997; Label: Atlantic (#82984); Formats: CD, CS, LP	16	31 (2022)	—	37	5	3	RIAA: Platinum; MC: 2× Platinum; RMNZ: Gold
1999	Dosage: Released: February 9, 1999; Label: Atlantic (#83162); Formats: CD, CS, LP	21	—	—	48	5	21	RIAA: Platinum; MC: Platinum
2000	Blender: Released: October 10, 2000; Label: Atlantic (#83400); Formats: CD, CS, LP	22	—	—	—	3	—	RIAA: Gold; MC: Gold
2004	Youth: Released: November 16, 2004; Label: El Music Group (#60001); Formats: CD	66	3	—	—	30	—	
2007	Afterwords: Released: August 28, 2007; Label: El Music Group (#660011); Formats: CD, digital download	—	—	—	—	23	—	
2009	Collective Soul ("Rabbit"): Released: August 25, 2009; Label: Loud & Proud; Formats: CD, digital download	24	— (Note: Collective Soul did not enter the US Independent Albums chart, but peaked at number 10 on the US Top Rock & Alternative Albums chart.)	8	—	9	—	
2015	See What You Started by Continuing: Released: October 2, 2015; Label: Vanguard; Formats: CD, digital download, LP	25	— (Note: See What You Started by Continuing did not enter the US Independent Albums chart, but peaked at number 4 on the US Top Rock & Alternative Albums chart.)	1	—	—	—	
2019	Blood: Released: June 21, 2019; Label: Fuzze-Flex; Formats: CD, digital download, LP	— (Note: Blood did not enter the US Billboard 200, but peaked at number 15 on the US Top Album Sales chart.)	4	15	— (Note: Blood did not enter the ARIA Albums Chart, but peaked at number 34 on the ARIA Digital Album Chart.)	—	—	
2022	Vibrating: Released: August 12, 2022; Label: Fuzze-Flex; Formats: CD, digital download, LP	— (Note: Vibrating did not enter the US Billboard Hot 200, but peaked at number 28 on the US Top Album Sales chart.)	—	—	—	—	—	
2024	Here to Eternity: Released: May 17, 2024; Label: Fuzze-Flex; Formats: CD, digital download, LP	— (Note: Here to Eternity did not enter the US Billboard 200, but peaked at number 15 on the US Top Album Sales chart.)	—	— (Note: Here to Eternity did not enter the US Billboard Alternative Albums chart, but peaked at number 22 on the US Top Hard Rock Albums chart.)	—	—	—	
2026	Touch and Go: Released: April 18, 2026; Label: Fuzze-Flex; Formats: CD, digital download, LP	—	—	—	—	—	—	
"—" denotes a release that did not chart.

=== Live albums ===
Year	Album details	CAN	US	US Ind.	US Alt.
2006	Home: A Live Concert Recording with the Atlanta Symphony Youth Orchestra: Released: February 7, 2006; Label: El Music Group (#90601); Formats: CD	75	183	14	—
2017	Collective Soul: Live: Released: December 8, 2017; Label: Suretone; Formats: CD, DI, LP	—	—	4	23
2023	Live at the Print Shop: Released: November 24, 2023; Label: Fuzze-Flex Records; Formats: LP, 8-track	—	—	—	—

== Extended plays ==
Year	EP details	US	US Ind.
2005	From the Ground Up: Released: May 24, 2005; Label: El Music Group (#90502); Formats: CD, digital download	129	8
2020	Half & Half: Released: October 9, 2020; Label: Fuzze-Flex Records; Format: vinyl, digital download	—	—

== Singles ==
Year	Single	Peak chart positions										Certifications	Album
Year	Single	US	US Main.	US Alt.	US Adult	US AAA	AUS	AUT	CAN	NZ	UK	Certifications	Album
1994	"Shine"	11	1	4	—	—	8	25	6	21	80	RIAA: Gold; RMNZ: Platinum	Hints Allegations and Things Left Unsaid
1994	"Breathe"	—	12	—	—	—	95	—	35	—	—		Hints Allegations and Things Left Unsaid
1994	"Wasting Time"	—	—	—	—	—	—	—	—	—	—		Hints Allegations and Things Left Unsaid
1995	"Gel"	— (Note: "Gel" did not enter the Billboard Hot 100, but peaked at number 49 on the Hot 100 Airplay chart.)	2	14	—	—	52	—	8	—	—		Collective Soul
1995	"December"	20	1	2	11	—	97	—	2	34	—	RMNZ: Gold	Collective Soul
1995	"Smashing Young Man"	—	8	—	—	—	—	—	19	—	—		Collective Soul
1995	"The World I Know"	19	1	6	18	1	41	—	1	25	—	RMNZ: Platinum	Collective Soul
1996	"Where the River Flows"	—	1	—	—	—	99	—	39	—	—		Collective Soul
1997	"Precious Declaration"	65	1	6	—	16	81	—	5	—	—		Disciplined Breakdown
1997	"Listen"	72	1	17	—	15	—	—	39	—	—		Disciplined Breakdown
1997	"Blame"	—	11	—	—	—	—	—	25	—	—		Disciplined Breakdown
1998	"She Said"	—	16	39	—	—	—	—	23	—	—		Scream 2: Music from the Dimension Motion Picture
1999	"Run"	76	—	36	12	1	48	—	9	—	—		Dosage
1999	"Heavy"	73	1	5	—	—	—	—	5	—	—		Dosage
1999	"Needs"	—	—	—	—	—	—	—	—	—	—		Dosage
1999	"No More, No Less"	123	10	32	—	10	67	—	31	—	—		Dosage
1999	"Tremble for My Beloved"	—	35	—	—	—	—	—	—	—	—		Dosage
2000	"Why, Pt. 2"	111	2	19	—	16	—	—	—	—	—		Blender
2001	"Vent"	—	34	—	—	—	—	—	—	—	—		Blender
2001	"Perfect Day" (featuring Elton John)	—	—	—	29	10	—	—	—	13	—		Blender
2001	"Next Homecoming"	—	39	—	—	—	—	—	—	—	—		Seven Year Itch: Greatest Hits, 1994-2001
2004	"Counting the Days"	—	8	—	—	—	—	—	15	—	—		Youth
2005	"Better Now"	117	35	—	9	10	—	—	41	—	—		Youth
2005	"How Do You Love"	—	—	—	16	—	—	—	—	—	—		Youth
2007	"Hollywood"	—	—	—	22	8	—	—	91	—	—		Afterwords
2008	"All That I Know"	—	—	—	39	27	—	—	—	—	—		Afterwords
2009	"Staring Down"	—	—	—	18	15	—	—	—	—	—		Collective Soul
2009	"Welcome All Again"	—	—	—	—	—	—	—	—	—	—		Collective Soul
2010	"You"	—	—	—	35	—	—	—	—	—	—		Collective Soul
2010	"Tremble for My Beloved (Reissue)"	—	—	—	—	—	—	—	—	—	—		Non-album single
2015	"This"	—	—	—	—	—	—	—	—	—	—		See What You Started by Continuing
2015	"AYTA"	—	—	—	—	—	—	—	—	—	—		See What You Started by Continuing
2015	"Hurricane"	—	—	—	—	—	—	—	—	—	—		See What You Started by Continuing
2015	"Contagious"	—	—	—	—	—	—	—	—	—	—		See What You Started by Continuing
2019	"Right as Rain"	—	32	—	—	—	—	—	—	—	—		Blood
2019	"Good Place to Start"	—	—	—	—	—	—	—	—	—	—		Blood
2019	"Them Blues"	—	—	—	—	—	—	—	—	—	—		Blood
2020	"Let Her Out"	—	—	—	—	—	—	—	—	—	—		Half & Half
2022	"All Our Pieces"	—	—	—	—	—	—	—	—	—	—		Vibrating
2022	"Cut the Cord"	—	—	—	—	—	—	—	—	—	—		Vibrating
2024	"Mother's Love"	—	—	—	—	—	—	—	—	—	—		Here to Eternity
2024	"Bluer Than So Blue"	—	—	—	—	—	—	—	—	—	—		Here to Eternity
2026	"Eye on You"	—	—	—	—	—	—	—	—	—	—		Touch and Go
"—" denotes a release that did not chart.

== Music videos ==
Year	Title	Director(s)
1994	"Shine"	Ken Fox
1994	"Breathe"	Samuel Bayer
1995	"Gel"	David Cameron
1995	"December"	Lynn Spinnato
1995	"Smashing Young Man"	Chris Applebaum
1995	"The World I Know"	Guy Guillet
1997	"Precious Declaration"	Lawrence Carroll
1997	"Listen"	Paul Andresen
1997	"Blame"	Paul Andresen
1998	"She Said"	Paul Andresen
1999	"Run"	Martin Weisz
1999	"Needs"	
2000	"Why, Pt. 2"	Marcos Siega
2001	"Perfect Day"	
2005	"Better Now"	Jarrett Fijal / Leonard Shields
2005	"How Do You Love?"	
2007	"Hollywood"	
2008	"All That I Know"	
2009	"Staring Down"	
2009	"Welcome All Again"	
2010	"Tremble for My Beloved" (Reissue)	
2016	"AYTA"	Joseph Guay
2019	"Over Me"	
2022	"Right as Rain"	
2022	"Cut the Cord"	
2022	"All Our Pieces"	
2024	"Mother's Love"	Adam Blank
2026	"Eye on You"	
2026	"Feel"	
