= Dandy Life =

Song by Collective Soul

from the album Dosage
- Released: February 9, 1999
- Recorded: 1998; Atlanta, Georgia (Tree Studios)
- Genre: Alternative rock
- Length: 4:03
- Label: Atlantic
- Songwriter(s): Ross Childress

"Dandy Life" is a song by the American rock band Collective Soul. It is the sixth track from their fourth studio album Dosage.

== Background ==
"Dandy Life" was written by lead guitarist Ross Childress, who provided lead vocals on the track. It was the first of two commercially released songs by Collective Soul that do not feature vocals from lead singer Ed Roland; the latter one is "I Don't Need Anymore Friends" from the album Afterwords (2007), which was written and sung by Childress' successor, lead guitarist Joel Kosche.

Commenting on the creation of "Dandy Life," Roland said:

Ross wrote that one. He actually had written that one and another one called "Tell." He went back and forth between the two for a while there. Eventually he decided to go with "Dandy Life." I think he was working through to that comfort level, y'know. It's hard when you're recording the song that's going to be your showcase on the album. That can be a kind of pressure situation. In the end, I wish I'd have written that song. It's a great pop tune. So I'm really proud of him and excited that we did it.

== Live performances ==
Collective Soul performed the song once during their Dosage Tour at the House of Blues in the Las Vegas Valley on September 21, 1999. It was also performed live at the House of Blues in Chicago on April 21, 2001.

== Cover versions ==
Childress' group Starfish and Coffee performed the song live during their tenure as a band.
