= Seven Year Itch: Greatest Hits, 1994–2001 =

Greatest hits album by Collective Soul
- Released: September 18, 2001
- Recorded: 1992–2001
- Genre: Alternative rock, post-grunge
- Length: 51:56
- Label: Atlantic
- Producer: Ed Roland

Collective Soul chronology
Blender (2000)	Seven Year Itch: Greatest Hits, 1994–2001 (2001)	Youth (2004)

Professional ratings
Review scores
Source	Rating
AllMusic	4/5 stars

Seven Year Itch: Greatest Hits, 1994–2001 (stylized as 7even Year Itch) is the first greatest hits album by Collective Soul, released on September 18, 2001. The compilation includes songs recorded from 1994 to 2001 and included two new tracks, "Next Homecoming" and "Energy". Seven Year Itch received decent reviews and was relatively successful. It sold 225,000 copies in the first year after its release and reached number 50 on the Billboard 200; in Canada, it reached number nine on its albums chart and went platinum.

The compilation has sold over 500,000 copies. It saw a resurgence in sales after Collective Soul began putting out albums on their own independent label, El Music Group, beginning in 2004.

Seven Year Itch was the last album Collective Soul released through Atlantic Records and their last album to feature guitarist Ross Childress, who had been with the band since its 1993 debut.

== Track listing ==
All tracks are written by Ed Roland, except where noted.

No.	Title	Writer(s)	Original release	Length
1.	"Heavy"		Dosage (1999)	2:55
2.	"She Said"		Dosage	4:14
3.	"Shine"		Hints Allegations and Things Left Unsaid (1993)	5:06
4.	"Energy"		Previously unreleased	3:19
5.	"Run"		Dosage	4:33
6.	"Gel"		Collective Soul (1995)	2:58
7.	"Precious Declaration"		Disciplined Breakdown (1997)	3:41
8.	"Why, Pt. 2"		Blender (2000)	3:37
9.	"The World I Know"	Roland, Ross Childress	Collective Soul	4:15
10.	"Next Homecoming"		Previously unreleased	3:11
11.	"Listen"		Disciplined Breakdown	4:12
12.	"December"		Collective Soul	4:43
13.	"Forgiveness"		Disciplined Breakdown	5:00

On the CD case, the length of "She Said" is written as 4:51, in reference to the version from the soundtrack to the film Scream 2 (1997).

== Track notes ==
- "She Said" was previously released as a hidden track on Dosage, where it was merged on the same track as the album's listed closer "Crown". A different mix of "She Said" was first released on the Scream 2 soundtrack.
- Some releases have "Perfect Day" featuring Elton John, originally from Blender as track 7 following "Gel", moving "Precious Declaration" onwards down one place.

== Personnel ==
- Ed Roland – vocals, keyboards, guitars
- Ross Childress – lead and rhythm guitars
- Dean Roland – rhythm guitars, backup vocals
- Will Turpin – bass, percussion, backup vocals
- Shane Evans – drums, percussion

== Charts ==
=== Weekly charts ===
Weekly chart performance for Seven Year Itch: Greatest Hits, 1994–2001
Chart (2001)	Peak position
Australian Albums (ARIA)	98
Canadian Albums (Billboard)	9
New Zealand Albums (RMNZ)	49
US Billboard 200	50

=== Year-end charts ===
Year-end chart performance for Seven Year Itch: Greatest Hits, 1994–2001
Chart (2002)	Position
Canadian Alternative Albums (Nielsen SoundScan)	140
