= Joel Kosche =

American musician (born 1969)

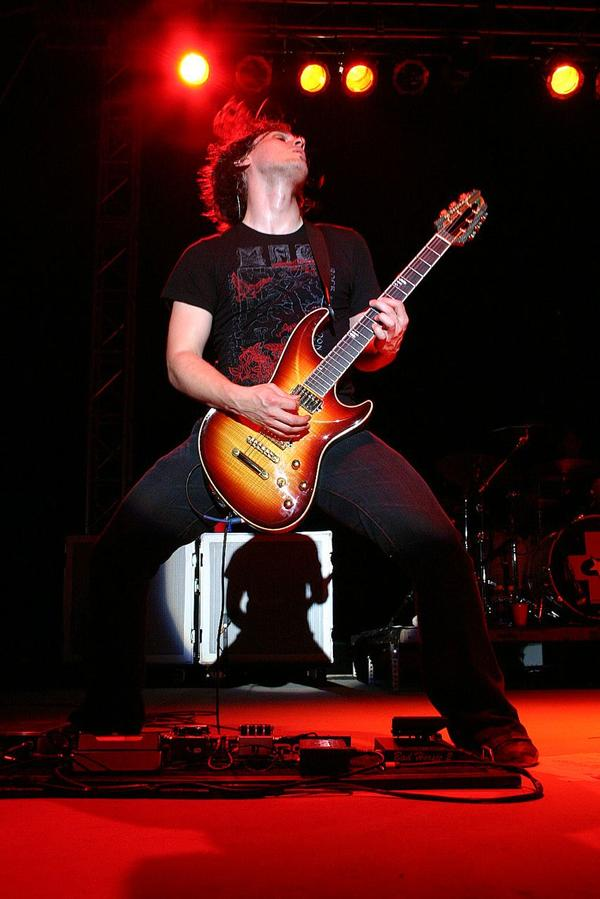

Background information
- Born: Joel Sefton Kosche; September 20, 1969 (age 57)
- Occupation: Musician
- Instruments: Guitar, vocals
- Years active: 1991–present

Joel Sefton Kosche (/ˈkoʊʃə/ KOH-shə; born September 20, 1969) is an American musician. He is best known for his thirteen-year tenure as the lead guitarist of the rock band Collective Soul. He is also a solo artist, and tours with his backing band, Joel Kosche Band. His debut solo album, Fight Years, was released in 2010.

== Life and career ==
Kosche self-taught himself to play guitar at age 13, and later trained in classical guitar. Active in Atlanta's music scene, he co-founded the band Rhapsody, and in 1994, along with other members of Rhapsody, he co-founded the progressive rock band Jovian Storm which achieved local success with the album Magic Show. During this time, Joel showed his progressive rock influences by specially in authoring and co-authoring several epic pieces in the tradition of his favorite bands such as Queen, Kansas and Yes.

After the dissolution of Jovian Storm, Kosche fronted the band Steep in which he sang lead vocals and embraced a leaner "American rock" style. Kosche eventually landed a gig as the guitar tech for the rock band Collective Soul.

Ross Childress, Collective Soul's original lead guitarist, left the band in 2001, with Kosche taking his place. Collective Soul performed their first concert with Kosche in Brisbane, Australia on September 5, less than two weeks before the release of the greatest hits compilation 7even Year Itch. Kosche continued to tour with Collective Soul and later became an official member of the band. Kosche's debut studio album with Collective Soul, Youth, was released in 2004. In 2006, Kosche announced that he would be leaving Steep to focus on Collective Soul exclusively.

In 2007, Collective Soul released the album Afterwords. Kosche co-wrote the album's lead single "Hollywood" with Ed Roland. Kosche also wrote and provided lead vocals on the track "I Don't Need Anymore Friends." It was the second of two commercially released songs by Collective Soul that do not feature vocals from lead singer Ed Roland; the first one is "Dandy Life" from the album Dosage (1999), which was written and sung by original lead guitarist Ross Childress.

In August 2009, Collective Soul released the album Collective Soul, also known as Rabbit to differentiate it from the band's 1995 album of the same name. Kosche co-wrote the tracks "You" and "Understanding" with Ed Roland, Dean Roland and Will Turpin. In September 2009, Collective Soul were inducted into the Georgia Music Hall of Fame.

At an outdoor concert in Rochester, Minnesota on August 21, 2011, it was announced that Kosche's wife had a baby daughter recently.

In August 2013, Kosche collaborated with online education site JamPlay.com, to put together a series of guitar lessons for aspiring guitarists and members of JamPlay.

Collective Soul kicked off their 2014 North American winter tour without Kosche; Jesse Triplett took his place as lead guitarist. On February 6, Collective Soul publicly confirmed Kosche's departure from the band: "After 13 great years, Joel Kosche has moved on in the world of music. Collective Soul welcomes Jesse Triplett as our new lead guitarist." On May 27, Kosche broke his silence regarding his departure from the band in a post written on Facebook, saying it was not an amicable split and that it had nothing to do with him wanting to pursue a solo career or wanting to "move on in the world of music."

== Discography ==
=== Studio albums ===
Year	Title
2010	Fight Years: Released: June 15, 2010; Label: Oh So Noir Music; Formats: CD, DI

==== With Collective Soul ====
Year	Album details	Peak chart positions		
Year	Album details	US	US Ind.	CAN
2004	Youth: Released: November 16, 2004; Label: El Music Group (#60001); Formats: CD	66	3	30
2007	Afterwords: Released: August 28, 2007; Label: El Music Group (#660011); Formats: CD, DI	—	—	23
2009	Collective Soul: Released: August 25, 2009; Label: Loud & Proud; Formats: CD, DI	24	—	9
"—" denotes a release that did not chart.

== See also ==
- List of lead guitarists
- List of lead vocalists
- List of people from Atlanta
