= Collective Soul (disambiguation) =

Collective Soul is an American rock band.

Collective Soul is also the name of:

- Collective Soul (1995 album), a self-titled album by Collective Soul, also known as The Blue Album
- Collective Soul (2009 album), a self-titled album by Collective Soul, also known as Rabbit

== See also ==
- Collective Soul discography
