= Home (Collective Soul album) =

Home: A Live Concert Recording with the Atlanta Symphony Youth Orchestra

Live album by Collective Soul
- Released: February 7, 2006
- Recorded: April 2005
- Genres: Alternative rock, post-grunge
- Length: 94:43
- Label: El Music Group EMG 90601
- Producers: Dexter Green, Collective Soul

Collective Soul chronology
From the Ground Up (2005)	Home: A Live Concert Recording with the Atlanta Symphony Youth Orchestra (2006)	Afterwords (2007)

Professional ratings
Review scores
Source	Rating
AllMusic	4/5 stars

Home: A Live Concert Recording with the Atlanta Symphony Youth Orchestra is a live album by Atlanta-based American alternative rock band Collective Soul. The performance is from two live Atlanta concerts with the Atlanta Symphony Youth Orchestra. The album peaked at #183 on the Billboard 200.

== Track listing ==
All songs written by Ed Roland, except where noted.

=== Disc one ===
1. "Orchestral Intro" – 0:27
2. "Counting the Days" – 2:45
3. "Listen" – 4:33
4. "December" – 5:17
5. "Compliment" (E. Roland, Dean Roland) – 3:38
6. "Precious Declaration" – 4:14
7. "Needs" – 5:47
8. "Heavy" – 3:20
9. "Run" – 4:50
10. "The World I Know" (Ross Childress, E. Roland) – 5:01
11. "Pretty Donna" – 4:02
12. "Youth" – 3:05

=== Disc two ===
1. "Crown" – 5:12
2. "Under Heaven's Skies" – 3:40
3. "She Said" – 4:44
4. "Home" (Dexter Green, E. Roland) – 4:25
5. "Gel" – 3:16
6. "How Do You Love" – 4:33
7. "Better Now" (Green, E. Roland) – 7:07
8. "Satellite" – 4:44
9. "Shine" – 6:25
10. "Burn" (Bonus studio track) – 3:40
11. "How Do You Love" (Video)
