= Georgia Girl =

Georgia Girl may refer to:

- "Georgia Girl", a song by Freddy Weller recorded in 1973
- "Georgia Girl", a song by Collective Soul, for their Afterwords 2007 album
