= Anniversary (Ed Roland album) =

Studio album by Ed Roland
- Released: 2016
- Recorded: December 2014
- Genre: Rock

Anniversary is an unreleased studio album by American rock musician Ed Roland.

== Background ==
Roland wrote and recorded Anniversary in honor of his wife, Michaeline. The couple dated for three years before marrying on February 17, 2006 in Savannah, Georgia.

The album was made available for streaming via SoundCloud on February 14, 2016, exclusively for Valentine's Day; and to celebrate the Rolands' impending tenth wedding anniversary. There are no immediate plans for Anniversary to be commercially released.

== Writing and recording ==
Anniversary was recorded over three days in December 2014. The album features Roland's current Collective Soul bandmates Will Turpin and Jesse Triplett, along with former Collective Soul drummer Shane Evans and guitarist Peter Stroud. Prior to recording, Roland performed "Something Like That" at the 2012 Symphonic Rocks concert in Cape Town, South Africa; while "Utah Moon" was written and performed on the spot at a Collective Soul concert in Sandy, Utah on June 12, 2014. A music video for "Searching For" was released via Vimeo on February 13, 2015.

== Track listing ==
All tracks are written by Ed Roland.

No.	Title	Length
1.	"Bed"	3:09
2.	"Now"	3:50
3.	"Belong"	2:52
4.	"Searching For"	3:22
5.	"Nothing Else Here Matters"	3:25
6.	"Choose"	3:58
7.	"Morning Coffee"	2:59
8.	"You And Me"	3:05
9.	"Utah Moon"	3:51
10.	"Something Like That"	2:53
