= Tremble for My Beloved =

1999 single by Collective Soul

Single by Collective Soul

from the album Dosage
- Released: September 7, 1999
- Length: 3:52 (album version); 3:14 (radio edit)
- Label: Atlantic
- Songwriter: Ed Roland
- Producer: Ed Roland

Collective Soul singles chronology
"No More, No Less" (1999)	"Tremble for My Beloved" (1999)	"Why, Pt. 2" (2000)

"Tremble for My Beloved (Reissue)"

Single by Collective Soul
- Released: December 7, 2010
- Length: 3:47
- Label: El Music Group
- Songwriter: Ed Roland
- Producer: Ed Roland

Collective Soul singles chronology
"You" (2010)	"Tremble for My Beloved (Reissue)" (2010)	"This" (2015)

Music video
- "Tremble for My Beloved" (reissue) on YouTube

"Tremble for My Beloved" is a song by the American rock band Collective Soul. It was released as the third single from their fourth studio album, Dosage, in September 1999.

== Background ==
Commenting on the creation of "Tremble for My Beloved" and its meaning, Ed Roland said:

When we did pre-production in Atlanta, this is one of the first songs we wrote. We were just trying to experiment. We knew all along that it was going to be the first song on the album, so we were trying to work out the little intro piece. Lyrically, it came together at the same time that I found out I was going to be a dad, so it's basically about the insecurities of being a father and bringing a child into the world especially since it was during that time when there were all those kids killing each other in school. I couldn't help but think, "Oh my God, have I really screwed up here?" The song touches on all the insecurity that comes with those thoughts and wondering if you could actually be a good parent. But it's been a great experience. My son was born in August and it's been so cool.

== Twilight ==
In 2008, over nine years after the song's release, "Tremble for My Beloved" was featured in the film Twilight as well as on its accompanying soundtrack. Following the film's success, the song's exposure earned Collective Soul new popularity among a younger audience.

Commenting on Twilight's impact on the band in an interview in 2012, Will Turpin said:

It gave us a huge shot in the arm. Soundtracks have a way of perpetuating the life of the song and when you're involved with something as popular as Twilight, it opens up a lot of new territory. Stephenie Meyer, who is the author of the Twilight books, is a big fan of Collective Soul and she handpicked every song on the entire first soundtrack. We've been fortunate in our career to have those moments. "Run" was on the Varsity Blues soundtrack and "She Said" was on the Scream 2 soundtrack. Soundtracks widen your exposure to people who might not normally pay attention to your music. I can look back on my youth and the soundtrack for Singles played a very big role in my life. It was just as popular as any Alice in Chains or Pearl Jam record and exposed me to a lot of great music. Twilight has exposed us to a new generation of fans. I remember seeing a lot of young kids at one of our shows after the movie came out and they knew "Hollywood" and "Tremble for My Beloved." Then when we'd play something older like "December" or "Shine," you could almost read their lips: "I didn't know they played that song?" It was almost verbatim every night there for a while. It's great. We've been around for almost two decades but with certain generations, there are dots that need to be connected and those soundtracks are invaluable.

== Reissue and music video ==
In December 2010, a re-recorded version of "Tremble for My Beloved" was released as both a single and a music video on iTunes. The music video was also included on the DVD Music Videos and Performances from The Twilight Saga Soundtracks, Vol. 1. The video was shot in August 2010 during a performance in Arequipa, Peru.

== Live performances ==
"Tremble for My Beloved" was the opening song for the Dosage Tour in 1999. The band also performed the song on The Tonight Show with Jay Leno in September that year. The song would remain off of the band's set lists for many years, with the exception of a few concerts performed in 2005. When the song regained popularity from the success of Twilight in 2008, the band began performing it live again the following year. As it was for the Dosage Tour in 1999, the song was used as the opener for the Dosage Tour 2012.

== Charts ==
Chart (1999)	Peak position
US Mainstream Rock (Billboard)	35

== Cover version ==
Vitamin String Quartet recorded a cover version for their Twilight tribute album, Vitamin String Quartet Performs Music from Twilight (2008).
