= There's a Way =

There's A Way may refer to:

- There's a Way, album by Ron Sexsmith 1986,
- "There's A Way", song by Clive Shakespeare 1977
- "There's A Way", song by Collective Soul from Youth (Collective Soul album)
