= Vibrating (album) =

Studio album by Collective Soul
- Released: August 12, 2022
- Studios: Edible Studios and Madison Studios, Atlanta, Georgia, United States
- Genre: Pop rock
- Length: 40:37
- Language: English
- Label: Fuzze-Flex Records
- Producers: Shawn Grove; Ed Roland

Collective Soul chronology
Blood (2019)	Vibrating (2022)	Here to Eternity (2024)

Vibrating is the eleventh studio album by American alternative rock band Collective Soul released in 2022. The album was originally intended to be the second half of a double album with 2019's Blood, but those plans were interrupted by the COVID-19 pandemic.

== Reception ==
Editors at AllMusic rated this album 4 out of 5 stars, with critic Stephen Thomas Erlewine writing that the album "does indeed vibrate" with "dense layers of fuzz and intertwined riffs" and sums up that it is "the sound of a band being fully, completely themselves, relying on their song- and studiocraft, resulting in an album that's far more tuneful and vigorous than the group's veteran status would suggest". In American Songwriter, Hal Horowitz scored this album 4 out of 5 stars, writing that "the pulsating and energized Vibrating feels like their second album, not eleventh" and he called this "further proof they’re as committed and passionate about their music as any working group closing in on its third decade". Niko Stratis of Spin called this work a "masterful pop-rock effort" that is evidence of "a band firing on all cylinders, their craft having been honed and sharpened over the years".

== Track listing ==
All songs written by Ed Roland, except where noted.

1. "Cut the Cord" – 3:41
2. "Reason" – 3:35
3. "All Our Pieces" – 4:17
4. "Take" – 4:16
5. "Undone" – 4:47
6. "Rule No. 1" (string part written by Stevie Blacke) – 3:50
7. "A Conversation With" – 3:41
8. "Just Looking Around" – 3:50
9. "Back Again" – 5:32
10. "Where Do I Go" – 3:08

== Personnel ==
Collective Soul

- Johnny Rabb – drums, percussion
- Dean Roland – rhythm guitar
- Ed Roland – acoustic guitar; electric guitar; lead guitar; piano on "Undone", "Just Looking Around", "Back Again", and "Where Do I Go"; lead vocals; production
- Jesse Triplett – guitar
- Will Turpin – bass guitar, piano on "A Conversation With" and "Just Looking Around"

Additional personnel

- Stevie Blacke – strings on "Rule No. 1", string engineering on "Rule No. 1"
- Lee Clower – photography
- Eric Frampton – keyboards on "Undone", "Rule No. 1", and "A Conversation With"; Wurlitzer electric piano on "Rule No. 1"
- Dexter Green – electric guitar on "Cut the Cord", "Reason", and "All Our Pieces"
- Shawn Grove – Mellotron on "Take", "Undone", and "Where Do I Go"; percussion on "Reason", "All Our Pieces", "Take", "Undone", and "A Conversation With"; engineering; mixing; production
- Gary Hooper – percussion on "Cut the Cord" and "A Conversation With"
- Daniel Kauffman – electric guitar on "Where Do I Go"
- Stephen Marcussen – mastering at Marcussen Mastering
- John Oliva – backing vocals on "Cut the Cord"
- Brian Porizek – art direction, design
- The Pounders – backing vocals on "All Our Pieces", "Undone", and "Where Do I Go"; clapping on "Where Do I Go"
- Lindsay Kris Roland – backing vocals on "Reason"
- Peter Searcy – cello on "Where Do I Go"
- Peter Stroud – electric guitar on "A Conversation With", "Back Again", and "Where Do I Go"
- Jessica Williams – backing vocals on "Where Do I Go"
- Christopher Yates – trumpet on "Where Do I Go", backing vocals on "Where Do I Go"

== See also ==
- 2022 in American music
- Lists of 2022 albums
