= Starfish and Coffee =

US musical group

- Also known as: The Ross Childress Experience
- Origin: Atlanta, Georgia, US
- Genres: Pop, rock
- Years active: 2006–2009
- Past members: Ross Childress; Andrew Carter; Bo Bentley; Thomas Michael

Starfish and Coffee were an American pop/rock band from Atlanta, Georgia. Their name comes from a song written by Prince and Susannah Melvoin on Prince's 1987 double album Sign o' the Times.

== History ==
Ross Childress was the original lead guitarist for the rock band Collective Soul from 1994 to 2001. Following his departure from Collective Soul, Childress collaborated with Econoline Crush frontman Trevor Hurst in a band simply titled Hurst. Hurst and Childress produced and wrote over 40 songs, with four of them appearing on the Hurst EP Wanderlust (2005); one of those tracks, "Not Broken", was later featured on Starfish and Coffee's self-titled album.

=== 2006–2007: The Ross Childress Experience and name change ===
In September 2006, Childress was asked to perform a charity concert in Atlanta by musician Andrew Adler of the local band The Hot Rods. Childress gave a noncommittal reply which Adler interpreted as a definite "yes" and was accidentally booked to perform as The Ross Childress Experience. Childress asked Bo Bentley (bass) and Thomas Michael (drums) to play with him, and the trio decided to form a band following the positive response of their gig at the charity concert.

On May 25, 2007, the band performed their first concert under the name Starfish and Coffee at Smith's Olde Bar in Atlanta. This show also marked the live debut of guitarist Andrew Carter.

=== 2008–2009: Starfish and Coffee and disbandment ===
On April 29, 2008, Starfish and Coffee released their self-titled debut studio album. Their debut single was "Tragicomedy".

On November 22, 2008, Starfish and Coffee won the award for Top40 New Group of the Year at the New Music Awards in Hollywood, California.

Starfish and Coffee continued to perform live shows until 2009. Childress released his debut solo album, Music Box, the following year.

== Band members ==
- Ross Childress – lead vocals, guitar (2006–2009)
- Andrew Carter – lead guitar (2007–2009)
- Bo Bentley – bass (2006–2009)
- Thomas Michael – drums (2006–2009)

== Discography ==
- Starfish and Coffee (2008)

== Awards and nominations ==
=== New Music Awards ===
The New Music Awards are given for excellence in music to both recording artists and radio stations by New Music Weekly magazine.

Year	Nominee / work	Award	Result
2008	Starfish and Coffee	Top40 New Group of the Year	Won
