= Johnny Rabb =

American drummer

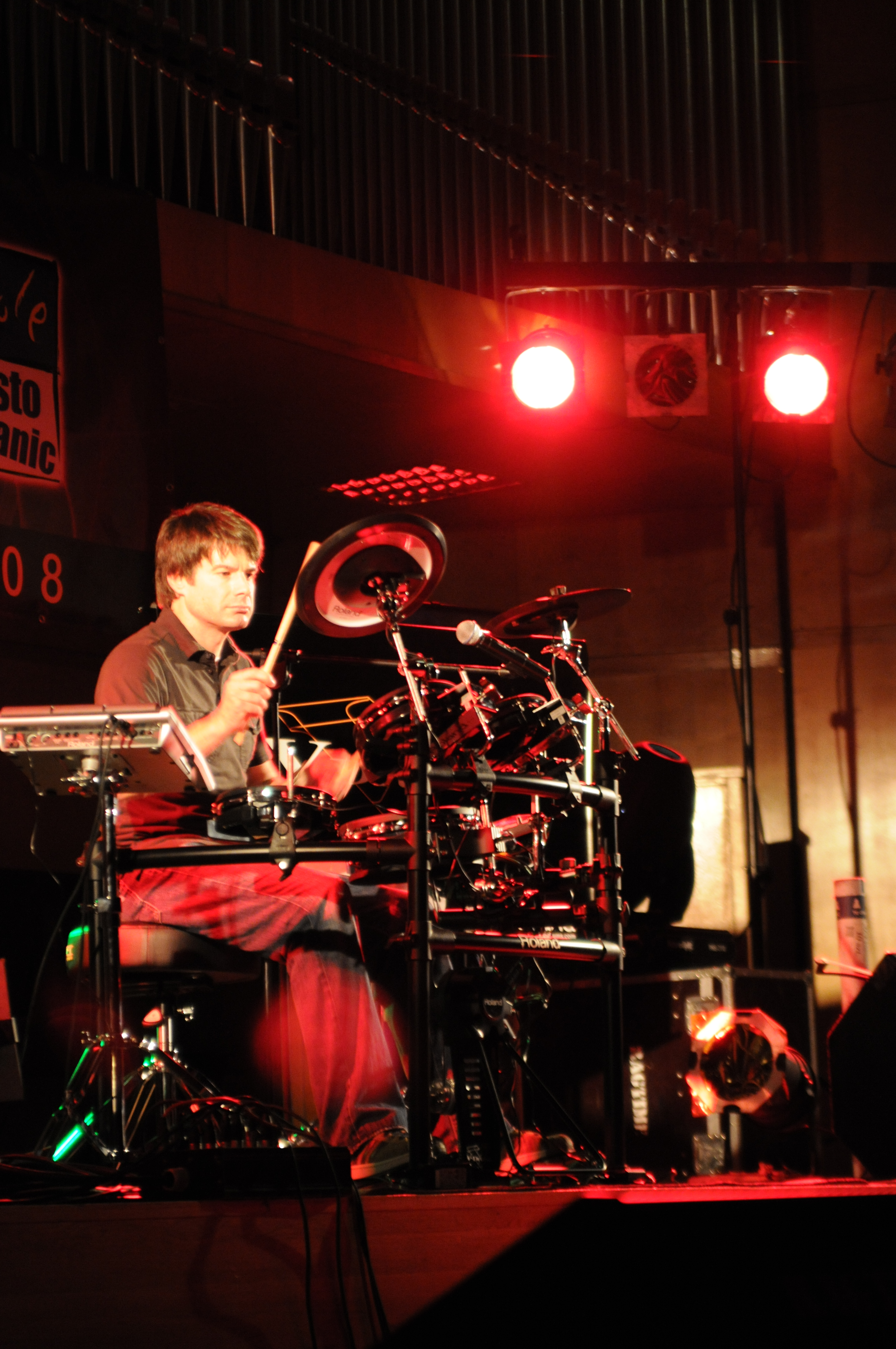
- Rabb performing in October 2008

Background information
- Born: February 29, 1972 (age 54)
- Genres: Alternative rock, hard rock, post-grunge
- Occupation: Musician
- Instruments: Drums, percussion
- Member of: Collective Soul
- Spouse: Phaedra Stamatopoulos
- Website: www.johnnyrabb.com

Johnny Rabb (born February 29, 1972) is an American drummer, author, inventor, and teacher.

== Life and career ==
As a product specialist for Roland V-DRUMS, Rabb has performed around 70 international clinic dates per year. Rabb designed a series of cymbals with the MEINL company: Drumbals and Safari cymbals are part of MEINL's Generation X line. Rabb designed a signature stick, TX7731W, for Pro-Mark drumsticks.

In 2006, Rabb and Clay Parnell formed the band BioDiesel, described as "environmentally friendly Intelligent Dance Music".

=== Collective Soul ===
Rabb became the drummer for Collective Soul in 2012, making his first live performances with the band during their Dosage Tour between May and July. Rabb's debut studio album with Collective Soul, See What You Started by Continuing, was released on October 2, 2015.

== Bibliography ==
- (2001). Jungle/Drum 'n' Bass for the Acoustic Drum Set: A Guide to Applying Today's Electronic Music to the Drum Set. Alfred. ISBN 9780757990250.

== Discography ==
=== With Collective Soul ===
Studio albums

- See What You Started by Continuing (2015)
- Blood (2019)
- Vibrating (2022)
- Here to Eternity (2024)

== See also ==
- List of drummers
