= Heavy (Collective Soul song) =

1999 single by Collective Soul

Single by Collective Soul

from the album Dosage
- Released: January 1999
- Length: 2:55
- Label: Atlantic
- Songwriter: Ed Roland
- Producers: Ed Roland, Anthony J. Resta

Collective Soul singles chronology
"Run" (1999)	"Heavy" (1999)	"No More, No Less" (1999)

"Heavy" is a song by American rock band Collective Soul. It was released as the second single from their fourth studio album, Dosage. It was the last of the band's seven number ones on the US Billboard Mainstream Rock Tracks chart, as well as their most successful, staying atop the chart for 15 weeks. It was also their last song to appear on the Billboard Hot 100, peaking at number 73. In Canada, the song gave Collective Soul their seventh and final top-10 hit, peaking at number five.

== Composition ==
In a December 2017 interview with Songfacts, lead singer Ed Roland explained the inspiration behind "Heavy". Referencing Collective Soul's earlier hit, "December", he said:

Once again, I wanted to write a song that didn't have a title in the lyrics. So, once again, I was being a little bitch I guess – I felt like I was being taken advantage of, so the whole thing is, "All your weight it falls on me." I was looking for a word that would fit what I was describing, like "All your weight it falls on me, it brings me down." The riff I felt was a heavy riff, so, "Heavy" just came up. And I wanted a song down to three minutes – I wanted it to move quick. That was written after we thought the record was done, and the guys were like, "No, we need to get this one in there." And I agreed wholeheartedly.

== Personnel ==
- Ed Roland – lead vocals, third guitar
- Ross Childress – lead guitar
- Shane Evans – drums
- Dean Roland – rhythm guitar
- Will Turpin – bass, backing vocals

== Charts ==
=== Weekly charts ===
Chart (1999)	Peak position
Canada Top Singles (RPM)	5
Canada Rock/Alternative (RPM)	1
Estonia (Eesti Top 20)	19
US Billboard Hot 100	73
US Mainstream Rock (Billboard)	1
US Alternative Airplay (Billboard)	5

=== Year-end charts ===
Chart (1999)	Position
Canada Top Singles (RPM)	73
Canada Rock/Alternative (RPM)	24
US Mainstream Rock Tracks (Billboard)	2
US Modern Rock Tracks (Billboard)	12
