= Youth (Collective Soul album) =

Studio album by Collective Soul
- Released: November 16, 2004
- Recorded: 2003
- Genre: Alternative rock, post-grunge
- Length: 37:51
- Label: EL
- Producer: Ed Roland, Dexter Green

Collective Soul chronology
Seven Year Itch (2001)	Youth (2004)	From the Ground Up (2005)

Professional ratings
Review scores
Source	Rating
AllMusic	3.5/5 stars
Blender	3/5 stars
Entertainment Weekly	B+
PopMatters	(nr)

Youth is the sixth studio album by Collective Soul, released in November 2004. The album was the band's first on their own label, EL Music Group, after leaving Atlantic Records following the release of their greatest hits album, Seven Year Itch. The album contains a more balanced pop-rock sound than their previous albums Dosage and Blender.

== Background ==
After 2000's Blender both Ed and Dean Roland went through divorces. The band attempted to work through these circumstances and, according to Dean, at one point had enough material for two albums. However said material was darker and the band wanted the songs to have "a more positive, 'light at the end of the tunnel'-type vibe". The band eventually scrapped the material and completely started over.

== Track listing ==
All tracks written by Ed Roland, except where noted.

No.	Title	Writer(s)	Length
1.	"Better Now"	Dexter Green, Roland	3:14
2.	"There's a Way"	Green, Roland	3:50
3.	"Home"	Green, Roland	3:57
4.	"How Do You Love?"		4:20
5.	"Him"		2:38
6.	"Feels Like (It Feels Alright)"		3:07
7.	"Perfect to Stay"		3:05
8.	"Counting the Days"		2:40
9.	"Under Heaven's Skies"		3:32
10.	"General Attitude"		4:00
11.	"Satellite"		3:24

== Personnel ==
- Ed Roland – lead vocals, rhythm guitar, keyboards
- Dean Roland – rhythm guitar
- Will Turpin – bass guitar, backup vocals
- Joel Kosche – lead guitar, backing vocals
- Shane Evans – drums, percussion

== Charts ==
=== Album ===
Chart (2004)	Peak position
US Billboard 200	66

=== Singles ===
Year	Single	Chart	Position
2004	"Counting the Days"	Mainstream Rock Tracks	8
2005	"Better Now"	Mainstream Rock Tracks	35
2005	"Better Now"	Adult Top 40	9
2005	"How Do You Love?"	Adult Top 40	16
