= Jovian Storm =

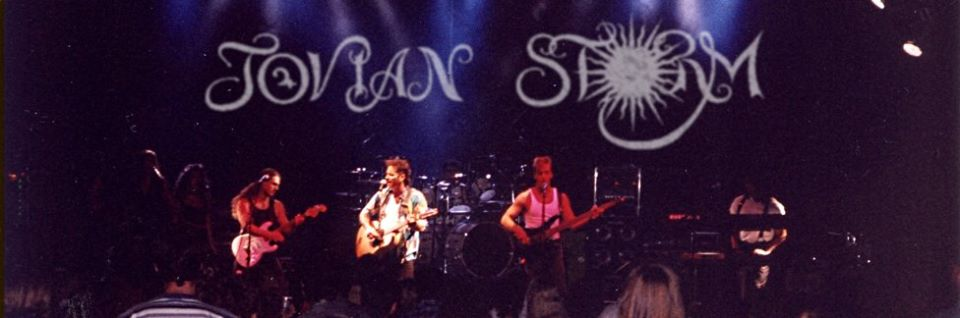
- Jovian Storm performing at the Roxy Theatre (Atlanta), October 19, 1995.

Background information
- Origin: Atlanta, Georgia
- Genre: Progressive rock
- Years active: 1994-1996

Jovian Storm was a progressive rock band from the 1990s, established in Atlanta, Georgia, USA. Founding member Joel Kosche, who made his musical debut with this group, continued on to become the guitarist for the internationally acclaimed rock band Collective Soul.

Drawing primarily upon influences from classic prog bands such as Kansas, Queen, Rush and Yes while unafraid to slip into an occasional 1980s pop refrain or a classical passage, Jovian Storm created a theatrical style that contradicted the raw, minimalist style of grunge that dominated rock music in the mid-to-late 1990s. In a 2012 interview, Kosche described Jovian Storm's sound as "all over the place--progressive, pop, older eighties-sounding stuff, I mean really anything except of course what was popular at the time!"

Jovian Storm's first and only album Magic Show showcased the talents of each band member with complex, unusual arrangements as with the title track, a 10-minute epic which included a piano/drum sonata midway. Today the album is a rare collector's find, due largely to the ex post facto fame of Kosche, but also due to a controversy over lost/stolen studio tapes which prevented the record label from printing more CDs. Recently, interest in Jovian Storm has been re-ignited after MTV reported that the missing studio tapes were recovered and found to contain unreleased material and alternate tracks which are now being remixed for a 20th anniversary re-release of Magic Show in 2015.

== Albums ==
Jovian Storm released only one official album, Magic Show (1994), although a bootleg live album Magic Smiths exists. Magic Show was both loved and hated by critics, loved for its virtuosity but hated for its instrumental overindulgence. Rolling Stone magazine called it "bold and beautiful" while Blender Magazine gave Magic Show only a 2-word review: "Magic Shit".

A second album was in the works in 1995, reportedly intended to be even more ostentatious than the first (perhaps in defiant response to the critics). The second album was to contain a 40-minute piece unofficially titled "Atlantis Falls: The Five-Part Trilogy", an apparent tongue-in-cheek reference to its own pretentiousness. However, for reasons unknown, this album was never finished. The bootleg Magic Smiths is reported to contain much of the unreleased material, performed live at the Coca-Cola Theatre in Atlanta.
