= Shane Evans (musician) =

American musician

- Born: April 26, 1970 (age 56)
- Genres: Alternative rock, hard rock, post-grunge
- Occupation: Musician
- Instruments: Drums, percussion
- Years active: 1989–present

Shane Evans (born April 26, 1970) is an American musician. He was the original drummer for the rock band Collective Soul.

== Life and career ==
=== Early life and career beginnings ===
Evans was raised in Stockbridge, Georgia. After graduating from Stockbridge High School, he began his career as a professional drummer for the band Marching Two-Step, which included Michele Rhea Caplinger, Ed Roland and Matt Serletic. The band performed local gigs for a few years, but never managed to grow beyond the club scene.

=== Collective Soul ===
Evans performed on tracks featured on Hints Allegations and Things Left Unsaid, an album consisting of Ed Roland's songwriting demos. He remained in the band for the albums Collective Soul, Disciplined Breakdown, Dosage, Blender, and Youth. He joined his former band on stage at the Georgia Music Hall of Fame in September 2009.

== Discography ==
=== With Collective Soul ===
Studio albums

Year	Album details	Peak chart positions					Certifications (sales thresholds)
Year	Album details	US	US Ind.	AUS	CAN	NZ	Certifications (sales thresholds)
1993	Hints Allegations and Things Left Unsaid: Released: June 22, 1993; Label: Atlantic; Formats: CD, CS	15	—	—	5	46	US: 2× Platinum; CAN: 5× Platinum
1995	Collective Soul: Released: March 14, 1995; Label: Atlantic (#82745); Formats: CD, CS	23	—	23	8	1	US: 3× Platinum; CAN: 8× Platinum
1997	Disciplined Breakdown: Released: March 11, 1997; Label: Atlantic (#82984); Formats: CD, CS, LP	16	—	37	5	3	US: Platinum; CAN: 2× Platinum
1999	Dosage: Released: February 9, 1999; Label: Atlantic (#83162); Formats: CD, CS	21	—	48	5	21	US: Platinum; CAN: Platinum
2000	Blender: Released: October 10, 2000; Label: Atlantic (#83400); Formats: CD, CS	22	—	—	3	—	US: Gold; CAN: Gold
2004	Youth: Released: November 16, 2004; Label: El Music Group (#60001); Formats: CD	66	3	—	30	—	

Compilation albums

Year	Album details	US	AUS	CAN	NZ	Certifications
2001	Seven Year Itch: Greatest Hits, 1994-2001: Released: September 18, 2001; Label: Atlantic (#83510); Formats: CD, CS	50	98	9	49	CAN: Gold

== See also ==
- List of drummers
