= Disciplined Breakdown =

Studio album by Collective Soul
- Released: March 11, 1997
- Recorded: 1996
- Genres: Alternative rock, post-grunge
- Length: 46:31
- Label: Atlantic
- Producer: Ed Roland

Collective Soul chronology
Collective Soul (1995)	Disciplined Breakdown (1997)	Dosage (1999)

Singles from Disciplined Breakdown
- 1. "Precious Declaration" Released: February 1997; 2. "Listen" Released: June 1997; 3. "Blame" Released: 1997

Professional ratings
Review scores
Source	Rating
AllMusic	4/5 stars
E! Online	C
Entertainment Weekly	B−
Rolling Stone	2/5 stars
The Rolling Stone Album Guide	3/5 stars
Wall of Sound	74/100

Disciplined Breakdown is the third studio album by American post-grunge band Collective Soul. It was first released on March 11, 1997. The album was recorded during a difficult time in the band's career, when they were going through a long lawsuit with their former management, and they also recorded the album in a cabin-like studio due to lack of money.

Although not as successful as their first two albums, Disciplined Breakdown did earn Collective Soul a million-selling album (platinum status) in the US, and charted at No. 16 on the top 200 Album Chart. Two songs also charted on the US Billboard Hot 100: "Precious Declaration" (US No. 65), also No. 1 on the Mainstream Rock Tracks for four weeks; and "Listen" (US No. 72), also No. 1 on the Mainstream Rock Tracks for five weeks.

In 1996, Atlantic Records manufactured and released a limited quantity of vinyl versions of the album before the album's full release several months later in 1997. This was done to promote the album's release. It was the first Collective Soul album to have a vinyl release.

To coincide the 25th anniversary, a two disc expanded edition from Craft Recordings was released in 2022 which featured bonus tracks plus all the songs from the band's live performance at Park West in Chicago.

== Track listing ==
All songs by Ed Roland except where noted.

No.	Title	Length
1.	"Precious Declaration"	3:41
2.	"Listen"	4:14
3.	"Maybe"	4:09
4.	"Full Circle"	4:09
5.	"Blame"	4:42
6.	"Disciplined Breakdown"	2:55
7.	"Forgiveness"	5:02
8.	"Link"	3:04
9.	"Giving"	3:06
10.	"In Between"	4:03
11.	"Crowded Head"	3:40
12.	"Everything"	3:46

Japanese bonus tracks
No.	Title	Writer(s)	Length
13.	"Simple" (Live at Park West, Chicago, IL 1997)	Roland, Ross Childress	4:41
14.	"Breathe" (Live at Park West, Chicago, IL 1997)		3:43

Expanded edition bonus tracks (disc one)
No.	Title	Length
13.	"Precious Declaration" (Salvation Mix)	3:41
14.	"She Said" (Alternate Version)	4:52
15.	"Listen" (Live at Park West, Chicago, IL 1997)	5:25
16.	"Disciplined Breakdown" (Live at Park West, Chicago, IL 1997)	4:14
17.	"Gel" (Live at Park West, Chicago, IL 1997)	3:17
18.	"Breathe" (Live at Park West, Chicago, IL 1997)	3:43

Expanded edition bonus tracks (disc two)
No.	Title	Writer(s)	Length
1.	"Precious Declaration" (Live at Park West, Chicago, IL 1997)		4:17
2.	"Maybe" (Live at Park West, Chicago, IL 1997)		4:14
3.	"Shine" (Live at Park West, Chicago, IL 1997)		7:05
4.	"Crowded Head" (Live at Park West, Chicago, IL 1997)		4:42
5.	"Collection of Goods" (Live at Park West, Chicago, IL 1997)		4:26
6.	"In Between" (Live at Park West, Chicago, IL 1997)		5:39
7.	"Blame" (Live at Park West, Chicago, IL 1997)		6:33
8.	"Smashing Young Man" (Live at Park West, Chicago, IL 1997)		4:16
9.	"Forgiveness" (Live at Park West, Chicago, IL 1997)		5:30
10.	"Where the River Flows" (Live at Park West, Chicago, IL 1997)		5:10
11.	"Crazy Train" (Live at Park West, Chicago, IL 1997)	Bob Daisley, Ozzy Osbourne, Randy Rhoads	5:44
12.	"December" (Live at Park West, Chicago, IL 1997)		7:41
13.	"Simple" (Live at Park West, Chicago, IL 1997)	Roland, Ross Childress	4:41
14.	"The World I Know" (Live at Park West, Chicago, IL 1997)	Roland, Childress	4:38

== Personnel ==
Collective Soul

- Ed Roland – lead vocals, guitar
- Ross Childress – lead guitar
- Will Turpin – bass
- Dean Roland – rhythm guitar
- Shane Evans – drums

Additional musicians

- Luis Enrique – percussion
- Mike Childers – additional background vocals, organ, clavinet
- The Memphis Horns – horn and horn arrangements (track 4)

Technical personnel

- Ed Roland – producer, additional engineering
- Greg Archilla – engineer, mixing
- Mike Childers – production assistance, additional engineering
- Malcom Springer – recording assistant
- Dave Wagg – mixing assistant
- Carlton Lynn – mixing assistant
- David Butler – production coordinator
- Stephen Marcussen – mastering

== Charts ==
=== Weekly charts ===
Chart (1997)	Peak position
Australian Albums (ARIA)	37
Canadian Albums (Billboard)	5
New Zealand Albums (RMNZ)	3
US Billboard 200	16

=== Year-end charts ===
Chart (1997)	Position
US Billboard 200	134

== Certifications ==
Region	Certification	Certified units/sales
Canada (Music Canada)	2× Platinum	200,000^{^}
New Zealand (RMNZ)	Gold	7,500^{^}
United States (RIAA)	Platinum	1,000,000^{^}
^{^} Shipments figures based on certification alone.
