= Blender (Collective Soul album) =

2000 album by Collective Soul

Studio album by Collective Soul
- Released: October 10, 2000
- Studios: Crossover (Atlanta, Georgia); Bopnique Musique (Boston, Massachusetts)
- Length: 38:53
- Label: Atlantic
- Producers: Ed Roland; Anthony J. Resta

Collective Soul chronology
Dosage (1999)	Blender (2000)	Seven Year Itch (2001)

Singles from Blender
- 1. "Why, Pt. 2" Released: September 12, 2000; 2. "Perfect Day" Released: 2000; 3. "Vent" Released: January 16, 2001

Blender is the fifth studio album by the American rock band Collective Soul, released in October 2000. This was their final and least successful album with Atlantic Records, though it did achieve Gold certification. None of its three included singles entered the Billboard charts.

== Release ==
"Why, Pt. 2" was released as the first single from Blender on September 12, 2000. Written by singer/guitarist Ed Roland, the song did not chart on the U.S. Billboard Hot 100 chart but did reach No. 2 on the Mainstream Rock Tracks chart. The "Pt. 2" in the title refers to an earlier track by the band, "Why", which was initially created during the band's Hints Allegations and Things Left Unsaid era, and was used as a b-side to the single "Breathe" in 1994.

The second single, "Perfect Day", was released in 2000 and features Elton John. "Vent", the third and final single, was released on January 16, 2001. It was originally titled "Prick", but was changed to "Vent" due to concern from the band's record label, Atlantic Records. The song is supposedly about the band's tension with the label. The band left the label in 2001, and created their own independent label, El Music Group.

== Reception ==
Professional ratings
Review scores
Source	Rating
AllMusic	2/5 stars
E! Online	B−
Entertainment Weekly	C+
Rolling Stone	3/5 stars
The Rolling Stone Album Guide	2/5 stars
Wall of Sound	48/100

In a retrospective review for Allmusic, Steven McDonald described Blender as commercially oriented and polished to the point of being bland, soulless, and too lacking in distinction to be of interest even as a curiosity. He also derided the boy band/Y2K pop cover art as being an obviously inappropriate image for Collective Soul, who were all in their late 20s or early 30s at the time of release.

== Track listing ==
All songs written by Ed Roland, except where noted.

No.	Title	Length
1.	"Skin"	3:08
2.	"Vent"	3:13
3.	"Why, Pt. 2"	3:37
4.	"10 Years Later"	3:21
5.	"Boast"	3:39
6.	"Turn Around"	3:39
7.	"You Speak My Language" (Mark Sandman; Morphine cover)	3:24
8.	"Perfect Day" (titled "Perfect Day Featuring Elton John" on the track listing)	3:48
9.	"After All"	3:44
10.	"Over Tokyo"	3:48
11.	"Happiness"	3:32

Japanese and Australian bonus track
No.	Title	Length
12.	"Over Tokyo" (Acoustic demo)	3:37

== Personnel ==
Collective Soul

- Ed Roland – lead and backing vocals, keyboards, guitar
- Ross Childress – lead and rhythm guitars
- Shane Evans – drums, percussion
- Dean Roland – rhythm guitar
- Will Turpin – bass guitar, percussion

Additional musicians

- Mike Lawler – Hammond organ
- AJR – keyboards, programming, turntable
- Lindsey Kris Roland – intro vocal (track 1)
- Jerald Jackson – clavinet (track 2)
- Shawn Mullins – intro vocals (track 2)
- Elton John – lead and backing vocals (track 8), piano (track 8)
- Jake Shapiro – cello (track 8)
- Antonio "L.A." Reid and Jeff Lanahan – handclaps (track 8)
- Butch Walker and Jayne Fincher – backing vocals (track 10)
- Megumi Higashiguci and Chika Goto – spoken word (track 10)

Production

- Ed Roland – production
- Anthony J. Resta – production
- Jack Joseph Puig – mix engineer (tracks 1, 3, 5, 11)
- Richard Ash – second mix engineer (tracks 1, 3, 5, 11)
- Chris Lord-Alge – mix engineer (tracks 2, 6, 8, 9)
- Matt Silva – second mix engineer (tracks 2, 6, 8, 9)
- Bob St. John – mix engineer (tracks 4, 7, 10)
- John Weston – second mix engineer (tracks 4, 7, 10)
- Karyadi Sutedja – engineering, digital editing

== Charts ==
Chart (2000)	Peak position
Canadian Albums (Billboard)	3
US Billboard 200	20

=== Year-end charts ===
Chart (2000)	Position
Canadian Albums (Nielsen SoundScan)	162

== Certifications ==
Region	Certification	Certified units/sales
United States (RIAA)	Gold	500,000^{^}
^{^} Shipments figures based on certification alone.
