= Collective Soul (2009 album) =

Rabbit

Studio album by Collective Soul
- Released: August 25, 2009
- Recorded: Atlanta, Georgia
- Genres: Alternative rock, hard rock, post-grunge
- Length: 40:15; 49:45
- Labels: Loud & Proud/Roadrunner Records
- Producer: Ed Roland

Collective Soul chronology
Afterwords (2007)	Rabbit (2009)	See What You Started by Continuing (2015)

Singles from Collective Soul
- 1. "Staring Down" Released: June 8, 2009; 2. "Welcome All Again" Released: July 6, 2009; 3. "You" Released: January 17, 2010

Professional ratings
Review scores
Source	Rating
Allmusic	link

Collective Soul, also known as Rabbit, is the eighth studio album by American rock band Collective Soul. The name Rabbit appeared in both press releases and promotional copies of the album, mainly in order to differentiate it from the band's 1995 self-titled album. It was released on August 25, 2009.

== Background ==
Rabbit is Collective Soul's first release with a parent label since the group started its own independent El Music Group label in 2004. It also effectively marks their return to Atlantic Records, as that label purchased Roadrunner in 2006.

Rabbit includes two songs ("You" and "Understanding") that were written by all members in the band, a first for Collective Soul. According to the singer, guitarist and keyboard player Ed Roland: "I think it's the confidence that the other guys have gotten in their music skills and the songwriting and also, for lack of a better term, me letting go of my ego a little bit..."

== Singles ==
The first single released from the album was "Staring Down", which was sent to radio stations on June 8, 2009, and was released on the iTunes Store on June 16, 2009. The second single, "Welcome All Again", was released on the iTunes Store on June 30, 2009, and was sent to radio stations on July 6, 2009. "Welcome All Again" is also in the "Shawn Takes a Shot in the Dark" episode of the TV series Psych.

== Commercial performance ==
The album debuted at No. 24 on the Billboard 200, and No. 10 on the Top Rock Albums chart, selling around 17,300 copies in its first week of release. It also debuted at No. 9 on the Canadian Albums chart.

The album has sold 71,000 copies in the United States as of September 2015.

== Track listing ==
All songs written by Ed Roland except where noted.

No.	Title	Writer(s)	Length
1.	"Welcome All Again"		3:54
2.	"Fuzzy"		3:59
3.	"Dig"		3:18
4.	"You"	E. Roland, Dean Roland, Joel Kosche, Will Turpin	3:51
5.	"My Days"		3:42
6.	"Understanding"	E. Roland, D. Roland, Kosche, Turpin	4:23
7.	"Staring Down"		3:35
8.	"She Does"		3:26
9.	"Lighten Up"		3:36
10.	"Love"		3:32
11.	"Hymn for My Father"		2:53

=== Digital deluxe edition bonus tracks ===
1. "Staring Down" (acoustic) – 3:25
2. "She Does" (piano version) – 3:02
3. "Heart to Heart" – 3:09

== Personnel ==
- Ed Roland – rhythm guitar, piano and keyboard, lead vocals
- Dean Roland – rhythm guitar
- Will Turpin – bass guitar, backing vocals
- Joel Kosche – lead guitar, occasional backing vocals
- Cheney Brannon – drums, percussion

== Charts ==
Chart (2009)	Peak position
Canadian Albums (Billboard)	9
US Billboard 200	24
