= Dosage (album) =

Studio album by Collective Soul
- Released: February 9, 1999
- Recorded: 1998
- Studio: Tree Studios (Atlanta, Georgia)
- Genre: Alternative rock, post-grunge
- Length: 50:22
- Label: Atlantic
- Producer: Ed Roland

Collective Soul chronology
Disciplined Breakdown (1997)	Dosage (1999)	Blender (2000)

Singles from Dosage
- 1. "Run" Released: 1999; 2. "Heavy" Released: 1999; 3. "Tremble for My Beloved" Released: September 7, 1999; 4. "Needs" Released: November 8, 1999; 5. "No More, No Less" Released: 1999

Professional ratings
Review scores
Source	Rating
AllMusic	3/5 stars
E! Online	C
Entertainment Weekly	B+
Rolling Stone	3/5 stars
The Rolling Stone Album Guide	2.5/5 stars
Wall of Sound	78/100

Dosage is the fourth studio album by the American alternative rock rock band Collective Soul. The album was released on Atlantic Records in February 1999 and peaked at number 21 on the Billboard albums chart. The album's title was derived from a catchphrase they used to describe burnout after their previous tour.

The first single from the album, "Heavy", gave the band another number-one hit on the Mainstream Rock Tracks chart and spent a then record-breaking 15 weeks on the top spot. "Heavy" was also featured in the opening of the video game NHL 2001 and in the 2014 Golden Corral ad. The second single released, "Run", also gained broad mainstream radioplay and was featured on the soundtrack for the 1999 film Varsity Blues.

Over nine years after the album's release, the single "Tremble for My Beloved" was featured in the 2008 film Twilight and its accompanying soundtrack.

In 2012, the band performed the album in its entirety (save "Dandy Life") during their Dosage Tour.

== Recording ==
Dosage marked a change in recording and style for Collective Soul. Unhappy with the production and sound of the previous album Disciplined Breakdown, the band focused more on production and technique for the recording of Dosage. The result led to an arduous six-month recording period where according to guitarist Dean Roland: "The way we recorded Dosage, we were really meticulous about everything that we did for that record." More than before, the band progressed to a high production pop-rock sound. This status was obvious with the extensive use of loops, Pro Tools effects, and synth-pop sounds, especially in comparison with the band's previous three albums, which are more organic and raw in sound.

Ed Roland also said, "Anthony brought an unbelievable spirit and attitude. He has more gadgets than we do so we all had a good time just plugging stuff in and seeing what sounds would work." Dean Roland said of working with Anthony J. Resta, "We started working with Anthony in 1999 or 1998 when we recorded Dosage and we just met him through another friend of ours. And initially, he just came in to help us with some programming ideas and drum arrangements, he's an amazing drummer and he's got that natural rhythmic thing going on. So he came in there and helped us with some of those things and that relationship just grew into other things you know like ultimately co-producing and co-writing with us. He's just a great soul, a great spirit to have around when you're working and creating".

Guitarist Ross Childress wrote two songs that were considered for Dosage, "Dandy Life" and the unreleased song "Tell". Ed Roland gave Childress the option to include one of the two songs for the album, so Childress picked "Dandy Life", which featured him on lead vocals.

== Track listing ==
All songs written by Ed Roland, except where noted.

No.	Title	Writer(s)	Length
1.	"Tremble for My Beloved"		3:52
2.	"Heavy"		2:56
3.	"No More, No Less"		5:18
4.	"Needs"		5:21
5.	"Slow"	E. Roland, Dean Roland	3:32
6.	"Dandy Life"	Ross Childress	4:03
7.	"Run"		4:35
8.	"Generate"		3:33
9.	"Compliment"	E. Roland, D. Roland	3:01
10.	"Not the One"		3:49
11.	"Crown" ("Crown" ends at 5:06. A hidden track entitled "She Said" starts at 5:59 after 53 seconds of silence.)		10:16

International edition bonus tracks
No.	Title	Length
12.	"Persuasion"	3:17
13.	"Almost You"

Enhanced edition bonus CD-ROM
No.	Title	Length
13.	"Almost You"

Limited edition bonus tracks (disc 1)
No.	Title	Length
12.	"Persuasion"	3:17

Limited edition bonus tracks (disc 2)
No.	Title	Writer(s)	Length
1.	"Shine""		5:07
2.	"Gel"
3.	Untitled		3:00
4.	"The World I Know"	E. Roland, R. Childress	4:16
5.	"Precious Declaration"		3:41

Record Store Day exclusive LP (side one)
No.	Title	Writer(s)	Length
1.	"Tremble for My Beloved"		3:52
2.	"Heavy"		2:56
3.	"No More, No Less"		5:18
4.	"Needs"		5:21
5.	"Slow"	E. Roland, D. Roland	3:32
6.	"Dandy Life"	Ross Childress	4:03

Record Store Day exclusive LP (side two)
No.	Title	Writer(s)	Length
1.	"Run"		4:35
2.	"Generate"		3:33
3.	"Compliment"	E. Roland, D. Roland	3:01
4.	"Not the One"		3:49
5.	"Crown"		5:06
6.	"She Said"		4:14

== Personnel ==
- Ross Childress – lead and rhythm guitars, backing vocals, lead vocals on "Dandy Life"
- Shane Evans – drums, percussion
- Ed Roland – lead vocals, additional guitar, keyboards
- Dean Roland – rhythm guitar
- Will Turpin – bass, percussion, backing vocals
- Anthony J. Resta – programming, synthesizers, drum loops, Mellotron

== Charts and certifications ==
=== Weekly charts ===
Chart (1999)	Peak position
Australian Albums (ARIA)	48
Canadian Albums (Billboard)	5
New Zealand Albums (RMNZ)	27
US Billboard 200	21

=== Year-end charts ===
Chart (1999)	Position
US Billboard 200	124

== Certifications ==
Region	Certification	Certified units/sales
Canada (Music Canada)	Platinum	100,000^{^}
United States (RIAA)	Platinum	1,000,000^{^}
^{^} Shipments figures based on certification alone.
