= Precious Declaration =

1997 single by Collective Soul

Single by Collective Soul

from the album Disciplined Breakdown
- Released: February 1997
- Length: 3:41
- Label: Atlantic
- Songwriter: Ed Roland
- Producers: Ed Roland; Anthony J. Resta

Collective Soul singles chronology
"Where the River Flows" (1996)	"Precious Declaration" (1997)	"Listen" (1997)

Music video
- "Precious Declaration" on YouTube

"Precious Declaration" a song by American rock band Collective Soul, released as the lead single from their third studio album, Disciplined Breakdown. The song became the band's third consecutive number-one single on the US Billboard Mainstream Rock Tracks chart and reached number six on the Billboard Modern Rock Tracks chart. In Canada, the song reached number six on the RPM 100 Hit Tracks chart and number one on the RPM Alternative 30.

== Composition ==
In a December 2017 interview with Songfacts, lead singer Ed Roland explained the inspiration behind "Precious Declaration":

That's after we did go through a breakup with the manager with "December." So, that was basically about going through a lawsuit. "Precious Declaration" is when they signed the release that we could continue being a band and continue on with our career. He got what he thought was his, and I got what I thought was mine. Hence, "Precious Declaration" means yours is yours, and mine you leave alone now.

== Charts ==
=== Weekly charts ===
Chart (1997)	Peak position
Australia (ARIA)	81
Canada Top Singles (RPM)	5
Canada Rock/Alternative (RPM)	1
Quebec Airplay (ADISQ)	13
US Billboard Hot 100	65
US Alternative Airplay (Billboard)	6
US Mainstream Rock (Billboard)	1
US Adult Alternative Top 30 (Radio & Records)	16
US Pop/Alternative Top 20 (Radio & Records)	12

=== Year-end charts ===
Chart (1997)	Position
Canada Top Singles (RPM)	43
Canada Rock/Alternative (RPM)	30
US Mainstream Rock Tracks (Billboard)	5
US Modern Rock Tracks (Billboard)	46

== Release history ==
Region	Date	Format(s)	Label(s)	Ref.
United States	February 1997	Rock radio	Atlantic	
United States	March 4, 1997	Contemporary hit radio	Atlantic	
