= Afterwords (Collective Soul album) =

Studio album by Collective Soul
- Released: August 27, 2007
- Studio: Tree Sound Studios in Atlanta, Georgia; Bopnique Musique in Boston, Massachusetts; Edible Studios in Atlanta, Georgia; Flame Under Heel Studios
- Genre: Post-grunge; alternative rock
- Length: 40:09; 49:34
- Label: El Music Group
- Producer: Ed Roland, Joel Kosche, Shawn Grove, Anthony J. Resta

Collective Soul chronology
Home (2006)	Afterwords (2007)	Collective Soul (2009)

Singles from Afterwords
- 1. "Hollywood" Released: June 11, 2007; 2. "All That I Know" Released: 2008

Afterwords is the seventh studio album by Atlanta-based rock band Collective Soul, released on August 28, 2007. The album was released digitally in the iTunes Store and physical copies of the album were available only at Target Stores following an exclusive deal the band made with the chain. The album was later re-released at all retail locations on December 9, 2008 with three new tracks written by Ed Roland.

== Track listing ==
All tracks are written by Ed Roland, except where noted.

Original release
No.	Title	Length
1.	"New Vibration"	3:20
2.	"What I Can Give You"	3:45
3.	"Never Here Alone"	3:05
4.	"Bearing Witness"	3:36
5.	"All That I Know"	4:11
6.	"I Don't Need Anymore Friends" (Joel Kosche)	3:34
7.	"Good Morning After All"	4:22
8.	"Hollywood" (Roland, Kosche)	3:06
9.	"Persuasion of You"	3:37
10.	"Georgia Girl"	3:25
11.	"Adored"	4:15

Bonus tracks
No.	Title	Length
12.	"An Evening With"	3:19
13.	"Ain't That Enough"	2:40
14.	"Give"	3:26

Professional ratings
Review scores
Source	Rating
PopMatters	6/10
AllMusic	3.5/5 stars

== Personnel ==
The following people contributed to Afterwords:

- Ed Roland – lead vocals, guitar, keyboards, producer
- Dean Roland – rhythm guitar
- Will Turpin – bass guitar, percussion
- Joel Kosche – lead vocals on "I Don't Need Anymore Friends", lead guitar, producer, engineer
- Ryan Hoyle – drums, percussion, programming
- Shawn Grove – producer, mixing, engineer
- Anthony J. Resta – producer, keyboards, guitar
- Karyadi Sutedja – mixing on "Hollywood", engineer
- Cheney Brannon – tambourine on "What I Can Give You"
- Jay Condiotti – engineer
- Stephen Marcussen – mastering
- Stewart Whitmore – editing
- Matt Lehman – design
- Richie Arpino – photography
- Jeremy Cowart – photography
