= Blood (Collective Soul album) =

Album by Collective Soul

Studio album by Collective Soul
- Released: June 21, 2019
- Genre: Alternative rock, post-grunge
- Length: 34:26
- Label: Fuzze-Flex Records
- Producer: Ed Roland

Collective Soul chronology
See What You Started by Continuing (2015)	Blood (2019)	Vibrating (2022)

Blood is the tenth studio album from American rock band Collective Soul. Released on 21 June 2019, the work was published via Fuzze-Flex Records.

== Critical reception ==
Scott Medina of Sonic Perspectives refers to the work as "one of the strongest albums of their career" going on to say that "Lead songwriter Ed Roland proves that he still has a penchant for churning out catchy melodies and the collective band have the skills to realize his vision, making for a very satisfying romp through these ten songs".

Mark Rockpit of The Rockpit stated that "‘Blood’ has plenty in the tank from the bouncy riff to opener ‘Now’s the Time’ and the even greater thrust and drive of the ‘Cheap Trick in an alternate Universe’ second up ‘Over Me’ before ‘Crushed’ adds even more with a quirkier (almost) dash of The Tubes and melodies that throw in the kitchen sink!"

Stephen Thomas Erlewine of AllMusic indicated that "At this point in their career, Collective Soul are acting like veterans, playing music that builds upon their older work, music that ignores the present day by going deeper into the familiar" continuing on to say that "Even if Blood offers the kind of densely saturated melodies and hooks that are Collective Soul's trademarks, it doesn't feel like a throwback, nor does it seem like a nostalgia trip."

== Track listing ==
1. "Now’s the Time" – 2:56
2. "Over Me" – 3:16
3. "Crushed" – 2:51
4. "Right as Rain" – 3:29
5. "Them Blues" – 3:55
6. "Good Place to Start" – 3:24
7. "Observation of Thoughts" – 4:03
8. "Changed" – 3:30
9. "Big Sky" – 2:55
10. "Porch Swing" – 4:07
