= Anthony J. Resta =

Canadian record producer and musician

- Occupations: Record producer; musician
- Instruments: Guitar; bass guitar; drums; percussion; keyboards
- Years active: 1980s–present

Anthony J. Resta is a Canadian musician and record producer. He has received awards for work on film soundtracks. Resta has also engineered albums for Duran Duran, Blondie, Elton John, Megadeth, Shawn Mullins, Collective Soul, and Perry Farrell.

== Collaborations and projects ==
Resta has also worked with artists including Guster, and Needtobreathe. His film and television work includes contributions to The Saint, Scream 3, Twilight, and Melrose Place. He has also been involved in projects by TV Mania, a collaboration between Nick Rhodes and Warren Cuccurullo, and has participated in the composers’ collective Electrons.

== Awards ==
- 2015: Hollywood Music in Media Awards, Music Genre winner in the Producer/Production category.
- 2022: Indie Short Fest, Los Angeles International Film Festival, award for Best Original Score for the indie short film The Chair.
