= Ross Childress =

American musician (born 1971)

- Born: September 8, 1971 (age 53); Stockbridge, Georgia, U.S.
- Occupation: Musician
- Instrument(s): Guitar, keyboards, vocals

Ross Childress (born September 8, 1971) is an American musician. He was the original lead guitarist and co-songwriter for the rock band Collective Soul.

== Life and career ==
Childress was born on September 8, 1971, in Stockbridge, Georgia, USA.

=== Collective Soul ===
Childress grew up with and had played with the original band members of Collective Soul before the group signed to Atlantic Records in early 1994. Over a period of eight years with the band, he recorded on, and toured in support of, five studio albums that have sold over seven million copies and generated seven #1 singles on the U.S. Billboard Mainstream Rock charts. He left the band in September 2001, two weeks before the release of the greatest hits compilation 7even Year Itch with Joel Kosche taking his place. The band had released a brief statement on its website regarding the departure, urging fans to understand that the situation was very personal. Collective Soul performed their first concert without Childress in Brisbane, Queensland, Australia on September 5.

During his time with Collective Soul, Childress was known for his metallic guitar sounds and heavy riffs incorporating elements of metal and blues in his playing. Along with front man Ed Roland, he penned many of the band's popular "hooks." Childress wrote, sang lead vocals, and performed guitar on the song "Dandy Life" on the 1999 release Dosage. This was the first time that a member other than Ed Roland had sung lead on a studio recording.

=== Other projects ===
In 2004/2005, Ross returned to recording music as a studio musician for the Trevor Hurst project entitled "Hurst". Hurst is best known as the lead vocalist of the Canadian Rock Band Econoline Crush. Ross contributed in many ways, including co-writing & producing. The band recruited a few other musicians to join. The album has done moderately well in Canada since its release in June 2005. Touring with Trevor as "Early Moses," named after the Basquiat painting of the same name, Ross played a few shows, but decided not to play live and remain in the background.

In November 2006, Ross was mentioned on the Myspace.com page of Atlanta-based Metal/Rockabilly band "The Hot Rods" as the producer of their debut album "Rumble Seat" slated for release in January 2007.

In December 2006, a Myspace.com page for Ross appeared. It spoke of a new project entitled "Ross Childress Experience", consisting of himself on vocals/guitar, and two musician friends on bass and drums. With the addition of a second backup singer/guitarist in 2007, "Ross Childress Experience" was renamed "Starfish and Coffee," and their self-titled debut album was released on April 29, 2008.

In 2009, the post-Kansas band Native Window recorded the song "Surrender" written by Ross and Hurst for their album Native Window.

On November 23, 2010, Ross released his first solo album, the 10 track "Music Box". Ross has been featured in the cover band GoBox.

In April 2015, Ross co-produced & co-wrote a song for Atlanta, Georgia recording artist Lynnay Della Luce called "Soaked In Gasoline" along with Dacula, Georgia-based music producer Ryan Burton. The song was mainly recorded at Reel 2 Real Recording Studios in Jonesboro, Georgia, the studio that Collective Soul started at back in the early 1990s. The song was featured on a series of YouTube videos called "Session Time".

On April 17, 2018, Newnan, Georgia artist Sara Greer released "Chasing Shadows" which was produced by Ross. The release was announced on Sara Greer's official Facebook page. The song was released by Ryan Burton Music Group a Dacula, GA based independent record company. It is available online at all usual vendors. Ross plays all the instruments, did all the arrangements and most of the production.

On April 23, 2018 Ryan Burton Music Group broadcast on social media that Sara Greer would record 9 more songs with Ross for an expected summer 2018 release of an album. The recordings are being recorded at the "Tiger's Den" Ross' studio.

Dacula, Georgia artist Burton The Artist announced on his Facebook page on July 10, 2018, that he had released an album called "Gordie Howe Hat Trick" featuring a track called "Two Roads" which includes 3 guitar solos from Ross. It is an epic track that has the most recent electric guitar work from Ross.

On January 26, 2019, Ryan Burton Music Group posted on social media that Sara Greer would release "Drama, Drama" produced by Ross on March 15, 2019. It comprises nine original songs written by Greer; all instrumentation, engineering and production was handled by Ross.

Ross is currently half of the duo performing as 2 Broke Kings along with Stephen Wines. They are sometimes joined by former Collective Soul drummer Shane Evans while performing at metro Atlanta venues.

== Discography ==
=== Studio albums ===
Year	Title
2015	Acoustically Speaking: Released: November 2015; Label: Tiger Den; Formats: CD, DI
2010	Music Box: Released: November 23, 2010; Label: Fire Island; Formats: CD, DI

=== Extended plays ===
Year	Title
2014	Made in Atlanta: Released: July 22, 2014; Label: Tiger Den; Formats: CD, DI

=== Singles ===
==== As Featured Artist & Producer ====
Year	Song	Album
2015	"Soaked in Gasoline" (Lynnay Della Lucé featuring Ross Childress)	none

Year	Song	Album
2018	"Chasing Shadows" (Sara Greer featuring Ross Childress)	none

=== With Collective Soul ===
Studio albums

Year	Album details	Peak chart positions					Certifications (sales thresholds)
Year	Album details	US	US Ind.	AUS	CAN	NZ	Certifications (sales thresholds)
1993	Hints Allegations and Things Left Unsaid: Released: June 22, 1993; Label: Atlantic; Formats: CD, CS	15	—	—	5	46	US: 2× Platinum; CAN: 5× Platinum
1995	Collective Soul: Released: March 14, 1995; Label: Atlantic (#82745); Formats: CD, CS	23	—	23	8	1	US: 3× Platinum; CAN: 8× Platinum
1997	Disciplined Breakdown: Released: March 11, 1997; Label: Atlantic (#82984); Formats: CD, CS, LP	16	—	37	5	3	US: Platinum; CAN: 2× Platinum
1999	Dosage: Released: February 9, 1999; Label: Atlantic (#83162); Formats: CD, CS	21	—	48	5	21	US: Platinum; CAN: Platinum
2000	Blender: Released: October 10, 2000; Label: Atlantic (#83400); Formats: CD, CS	22	—	—	3	—	US: Gold; CAN: Gold

Compilation albums

Year	Album details	US	AUS	CAN	NZ	Certifications
2001	Seven Year Itch: Greatest Hits, 1994–2001: Released: September 18, 2001; Label: Atlantic (#83510); Formats: CD, CS	50	98	9	49	CAN: Gold

=== With Hurst ===
Year	Title
2005	Wanderlust: Released: June 28, 2005; Label: Fat Farmer Entertainment; Formats: CD

=== With Starfish and Coffee ===
Year	Title
2008	Starfish and Coffee: Released: April 29, 2008; Label: Tiger Den; Formats: CD, DI

=== Other appearances ===
==== Release contributions ====
Year	Song	Album
2014	"Air"	none
2014	"Nestmas"	none

==== Guest appearances ====
Title	Year	Other artist(s)	Album
"Land and Sea"	2013	Abel, Rawls & Hayes	Are We On Our Way

== See also ==
- List of lead guitarists
- List of people from Georgia (U.S. state)
