= Collective Soul =

American rock band

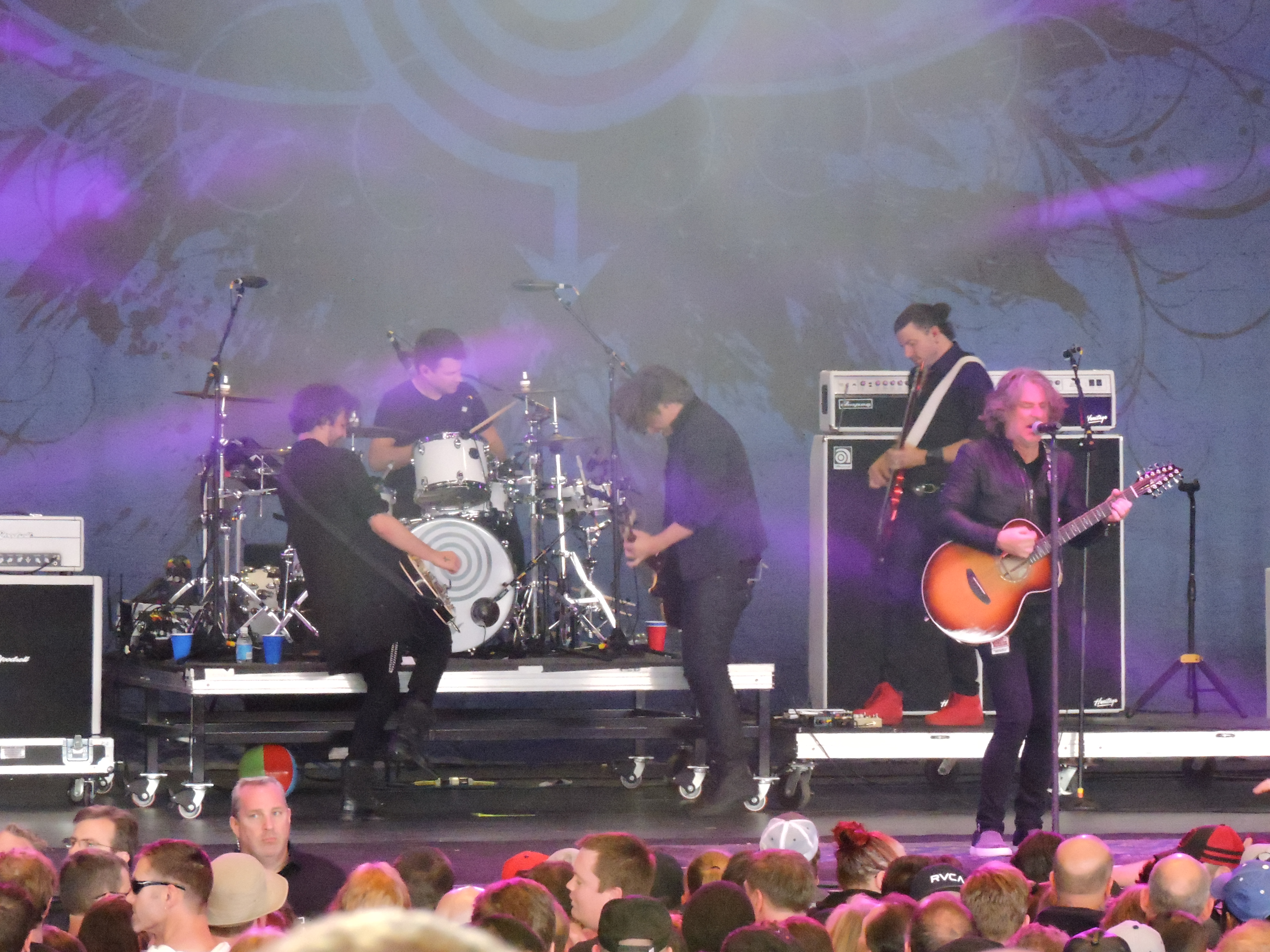
- Collective Soul performing at MMRBQ 2016 in Camden, New Jersey on May 21, 2016.

Background information
- Origin: Stockbridge, Georgia, United States
- Genres: Alternative rock; hard rock; post-grunge
- Years active: 1992–present
- Labels: Rising Storm; Atlantic; El Music; Loud & Proud; Roadrunner; Vanguard; Suretone; Fuzze-Flex
- Members: Ed Roland; Dean Roland; Will Turpin; Johnny Rabb; Jesse Triplett
- Past members: David Neal; Ross Childress; Shane Evans; Joel Kosche; Ryan Hoyle; Cheney Brannon
- Website: collectivesoul.com
- Logo

Collective Soul is an American rock band originally from Stockbridge, Georgia. Now based in Atlanta, the group consists of the brothers Ed (lead vocalist) and Dean Roland (rhythm guitarist), Will Turpin (bassist), Johnny Rabb (drummer), and Jesse Triplett (lead guitarist). Formed in 1992, the original lineup consisted of the Roland brothers, bassist David Neal, guitarist Ross Childress, and drummer Shane Evans. Collective Soul released their Hints Allegations and Things Left Unsaid album on the independent label Rising Storm Records in 1993. The band went from obscurity to popularity that year after the album's lead single "Shine" received regional radio play. Around the same time, Turpin replaced Neal on bass. The album was then re-released in 1994 by the major label Atlantic Records; thus, "Shine" became a national hit as it peaked at No. 1 on the Mainstream Rock and No. 4 on the Mainstream Top 40 charts.

Collective Soul released a self-titled album in March 1995. Considered by Ed Roland to be the band's "true debut album", Collective Soul spent 76 weeks on the Billboard 200 chart and went triple-platinum, becoming the band's highest-selling album. The singles "Where the River Flows", "December", and "The World I Know" each reached No. 1 on the Mainstream Rock chart, while the latter two singles also reached the top ten of the Hot 100 chart. About two years later, Collective Soul released Disciplined Breakdown. Although not as successful in sales as their previous two albums, Disciplined Breakdown contained two No. 1 Mainstream Rock chart hits with "Precious Declaration" and "Listen". The band released a fourth studio album, Dosage, in 1999. The album's first single, "Heavy", spent a then record-breaking 15 weeks on the top spot of the Mainstream Rock chart.

The band released Blender in 2000. It was the final album with their most well-known lineup as lead guitarist Childress left the band in 2001. Overall, the band's first five albums all received RIAA certifications. Collective Soul established their own label, El Music Group (which was later renamed to Fuzze-Flex Records), prior to releasing Youth in 2004. Original drummer Evans then departed from the band at the end of 2005. Collective Soul released five additional albums between 2005 and 2023: Afterwords (2007), Rabbit (2009), See What You Started by Continuing (2015), Blood (2019), and Vibrating (2022). The band then released their first double album in 2024, Here to Eternity. The band's 13th album, Touch and Go, was released in 2026.

== History ==
=== Early years ===
Before forming Collective Soul, singer Ed Roland studied music composition and guitar at the Berklee College of Music in Boston, Massachusetts. Since the mid-1980s, Roland was involved in Atlanta's underground music scene making demos and performing. He also worked at Real 2 Reel Studios in Stockbridge, which was owned by Will Turpin's father, Bill Turpin. Roland's duties were producing, mixing, and engineering for local Atlanta artists.

Roland recruited keyboard player and backing vocalist Christopher Dykes, drummer Tony Caporale, and bassist Skip Godwin to play live in clubs and showcase for A&R personnel from various record companies. At this time the group was simply known as Ed-E. They played several local shows, played a part in a CBS Movie of the Week, and were guests on the local Atlanta television program Music Peachtree Style (where local Atlanta-based artists were interviewed and profiled). That initial version of the Ed-E band dissolved in the mid-to-late 1980s due to incompatible musical tastes among other differences. Roland then formed the band Marching Two-Step which included vocalist Michele Rhea Caplinger, drummer Shane Evans, bassist Godwin (from Roland's previous band), and keyboardist Matt Serletic. Although the band didn't release any official material, they played in various clubs and also opened for The Psychedelic Furs at one point. They then disbanded after not finding success, and Roland subsequently released an independent solo album entitled Ed-E Roland in 1991. Overall, Roland's early attempts to be signed to a recording contract by a label faced rejections.

Caplinger would become a music industry publicist and also worked with the major label Atlantic Records. She was later appointed executive director of the Atlanta Chapter of the Recording Academy in 2000. Serletic would go on to become a Grammy Award-winning producer for Matchbox Twenty, Blessid Union of Souls, Edwin McCain, and numerous other artists, and also landed executive positions with record companies. Roland continued to remain friends with both individuals, and even worked alongside them in the future.

=== 1992–1994: Hints Allegations and Things Left Unsaid, signing to Atlantic Records, and initial exposure ===
After the demise of Roland's previous music collaborations, he enlisted musicians to record an album in a basement. The group made for the demo took its name ("Collective Soul") from a phrase in The Fountainhead, with Roland explaining that "we're not preaching Ayn Rand, objectivism, egoism, or anything...we just dug the name." Roland initially intended to sell the songs to a publishing company and had no immediate plans of forming a band out of it. The demo was then submitted to 88.5 WRAS. Amy Staehling, host of the Georgia Music Show at Georgia State University's 100,000 watt student radio station in Atlanta, added the song "Shine" to the local rotation. It was an instant listener favorite. The demo was also passed along to 101.1 WJRR in Orlando, Florida which began playing "Shine" too, soon to be its most requested song. Amidst the surprise popularity, Roland agreed to perform live shows. He enlisted his former Marching Two-Step bandmate Evans on drums (who also played on the demo songs), Ross Childress on lead guitar, his brother Dean Roland on rhythm guitar, and David Neal on bass, in what would be the first official lineup of Collective Soul. The band briefly used the name Brothers and Brides, but reverted to Collective Soul after a handful of shows. Atlantic Records took note of the popularity of "Shine" and subsequently signed them to a contract. Around the same time, due to personality conflicts, Neal was replaced on bass by Will Turpin. He initially provided percussion on one of the debut album's songs, and his father Bill owned the studio that Ed Roland previously worked at.

Upon Collective Soul's signing, Atlantic wished to capitalize on the band's success and quickly re-released the 1993 demo Hints Allegations and Things Left Unsaid as their first studio album in 1994. Although reluctant to have the unpolished demo represent their new lineup, Collective Soul gained international recognition and double-platinum status with their debut, which peaked at No. 15 on the Billboard 200. "Shine" had topped the rock charts and also peaked at No. 11 on the Billboard Hot 100, while the second single "Breathe" peaked at No. 12 on the Billboard Mainstream Rock chart. The band quickly began work on what they would consider their true debut record and were invited to perform at Woodstock 1994. They toured extensively across North America, and also served as an opener for Aerosmith in late 1994.

=== 1995–1999: Continued mainstream success, Collective Soul, Disciplined Breakdown, and Dosage ===
The group's self-titled second album was issued the following year. It was certified RIAA triple platinum and logged a 76-week run on the Billboard 200. Notable singles from the Collective Soul album included Mainstream Rock and Modern Rock charts No. 1 hits "December", "Where the River Flows", and "The World I Know", along with the No. 2 hit "Gel" and the No. 8 hit "Smashing Young Man". During the album's release, the band was the opener for Van Halen for three months. Afterwards, they embarked on their own tour as headliners.

Following a split with their manager, Collective Soul found their tour dates canceled and were called into the courtroom to face a legal battle that lasted into 1996, presumably with said ex-manager Bill Richardson. While the legal battles continued, the band went to a cabin, in the middle of 40 acres (160,000 m^{2}) of cow pasture in Stockbridge, and began recording. They recorded into a computer their impromptu efforts of songs Roland penned, and these became Disciplined Breakdown. The legal case was eventually settled, and both parties were instructed not to discuss the outcome.

Disciplined Breakdown, released in 1997, did not sell as well as their previous records despite debuting higher on the charts. The album eventually achieved platinum certification, and produced two more No. 1 singles on the Mainstream Rock chart: "Precious Declaration" and "Listen", along with No. 11 hit "Blame". The album eventually peaked at No. 16 on the Billboard 200.

Collective Soul took a break from touring and had only played a handful of dates throughout 1998. They had instead focused on recording. The band's fourth album was 1999's platinum certified Dosage. The first single "Heavy" set a new high mark for 15 weeks at No. 1 on the Mainstream Rock chart. Singles such as "Run", "No More, No Less", and "Tremble for My Beloved" gained notable positions on the rock charts as well. The album was produced by Anthony J. Resta, known for his work with Duran Duran and others. The band also performed at the Woodstock 1999 festival.

=== 2000–2003: Blender and departure from Atlantic Records ===
The group then released their fifth studio album, Blender, in October 2000. It did not sell as well as previous albums, although the first single "Why, Pt. 2" reached No. 2 on the Mainstream Rock chart. They achieved additional hits with "Vent" and "Perfect Day", the latter being a duet between Roland and Elton John. The album became RIAA certified gold. The album was their second effort with Resta producing.

In 2001, Collective Soul released their greatest hits compilation, Seven Year Itch: Greatest Hits 1994–2001 (the title being stylized as 7even Year Itch), which featured two new songs, the single "Next Homecoming" and "Energy". The record marked the end of the group's contract with Atlantic Records and the departure of lead guitarist Childress due to private personal differences. The band promoted their longtime guitar technician, Joel Kosche from Jovian Storm, to be the new lead guitarist.

=== 2004–2009: Formation of El Music Group, Youth, Afterwords, and Rabbit ===
In 2004, Collective Soul created their independent label El Music Group, which allowed the band greater control over the production and distribution of their music. In November of that year, they released their sixth studio album, Youth, which debuted at No. 66 on the Billboard 200. Due to personal issues, additional drum tracks on the album were by session musician Ryan Hoyle, who would play a more prominent place in the band increasingly. "Counting the Days" was the first and most successful single, as it peaked at No. 8 on the Mainstream Rock chart. The second single "Better Now" received significant airplay on the Adult Top 40 chart as it peaked at No. 9 and was used in commercials for the cereal Special K. The third single "How Do You Love" peaked at No. 16 on the Adult Top 40 chart. Overall, the resultant US and Canadian tours lasted over two years.

In May 2005, they released an eight-song acoustic EP compilation titled From the Ground Up, which had acoustic versions of past favorites, plus a new track "Youth". Collective Soul performed two shows with the Atlanta Symphony Youth Orchestra on April 23 and 24, 2005. A DVD and double disc CD of the performances, entitled Home: A Live Concert Recording With The Atlanta Symphony Youth Orchestra was released in February 2006. At the end of 2005, Evans was dismissed from the band due to extensive drug use. His place was filled by Hoyle, who was in the studio for the 2004 Youth album and had substituted on different occasions for Evans.

Collective Soul's seventh studio album, Afterwords, was released in August 2007. It was co-produced again by Resta who also contributed synthesizers, percussion, and lead guitar on the song "Bearing Witness". The band made a deal in the US with Target stores, making it the "exclusive physical retailer" of Afterwords for one year. The album was immediately available in digital form on iTunes. The record debuted at No. 25 on the Comprehensive Albums chart (as albums available only from a single retailer were ineligible for the Billboard 200 at the time). Billboard would later amend this rule due to similar successes of other artists via similar agreements.

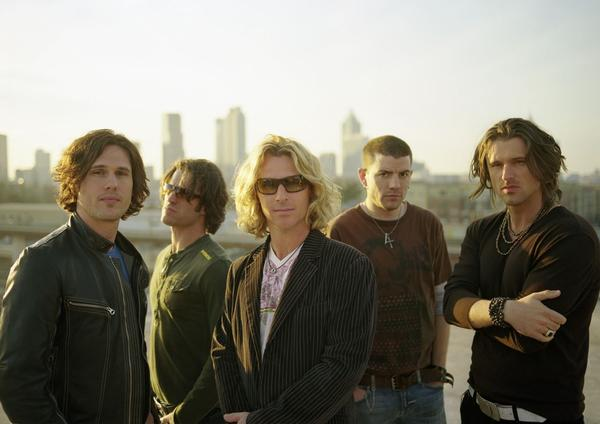
The band in 2007

The Adult Top 40 pop-rock single "Hollywood" was released in May. It became the theme song for the hit T.V. show American Idol. The band then made an appearance on The Tonight Show with Jay Leno on August 31 to promote the album where they performed "Hollywood". They were also the musical guest on The Late Late Show with Craig Ferguson. The second single "All That I Know" was released in November and charted lower than the prior single. In 2008, drummer Hoyle had left the band and was replaced by Cheney Brannon.

Collective Soul released their eighth studio album on August 25, 2009, with Roadrunner Records, a subsidiary of their previous label Atlantic Records. It was officially another self-titled album but was also named Rabbit to differentiate it from the band's 1995 self-titled release. The album debuted at No. 24 on the Billboard 200. The first single was "Staring Down" and the second single was "Welcome All Again". "Staring Down" charted at No. 18 on the Adult Top 40 chart. The third single, "You", also charted briefly on the Adult Top 40.

Collective Soul were inducted into the Georgia Music Hall of Fame in September 2009. In their induction speech, Roland thanked a long list of former members and collaborators who had been involved over the past three decades, including Childress, Hoyle, and Brannon. He also invited Evans on the stage to celebrate with the band.

=== 2010–2020: Focus on side projects, See What You Started by Continuing, and Blood ===
Collective Soul returned to El Music Group in 2010, and in December that year, the band released a re-recorded version of "Tremble for My Beloved" (originally from Dosage) as both a single and a video on iTunes. The video was also included on the DVD Music Videos and Performances from The Twilight Saga Soundtracks, Vol. 1. In 2012, the band embarked on the Dosage Tour, with touring member Johnny Rabb replacing Brannon on drums.

The band members were then involved with other projects. Kosche and Turpin began their own solo careers, releasing the albums Fight Years (2010) and The Lighthouse (2011) respectively. Dean Roland was a part of the rock band Magnets and Ghosts, alongside Ryan Potesta. The duo formed in 2010 and released their debut album Mass in November 2011. In 2011, Ed Roland began recording and touring with friends Christopher Alan Yates, Brian Biskey, Grant Reynolds, and Mike Rizzi. The group, Ed Roland and the Sweet Tea Project, released their debut album Devils 'n Darlins on September 3, 2013.

The band kicked off their 2014 winter tour on January 15, 2014, at Belly Up in Aspen, Colorado, where lead guitarist Jesse Triplett made his live debut as a member of Collective Soul. Triplett replaced Kosche, who had been with the band since replacing original lead guitarist Childress in 2001. On February 6, Collective Soul publicly confirmed Kosche's departure from the band. On May 27, Kosche broke his silence regarding his departure from the band, saying it was not an amicable split and that it had nothing to do with him wanting to pursue a solo career or wanting to "move on in the world of music."

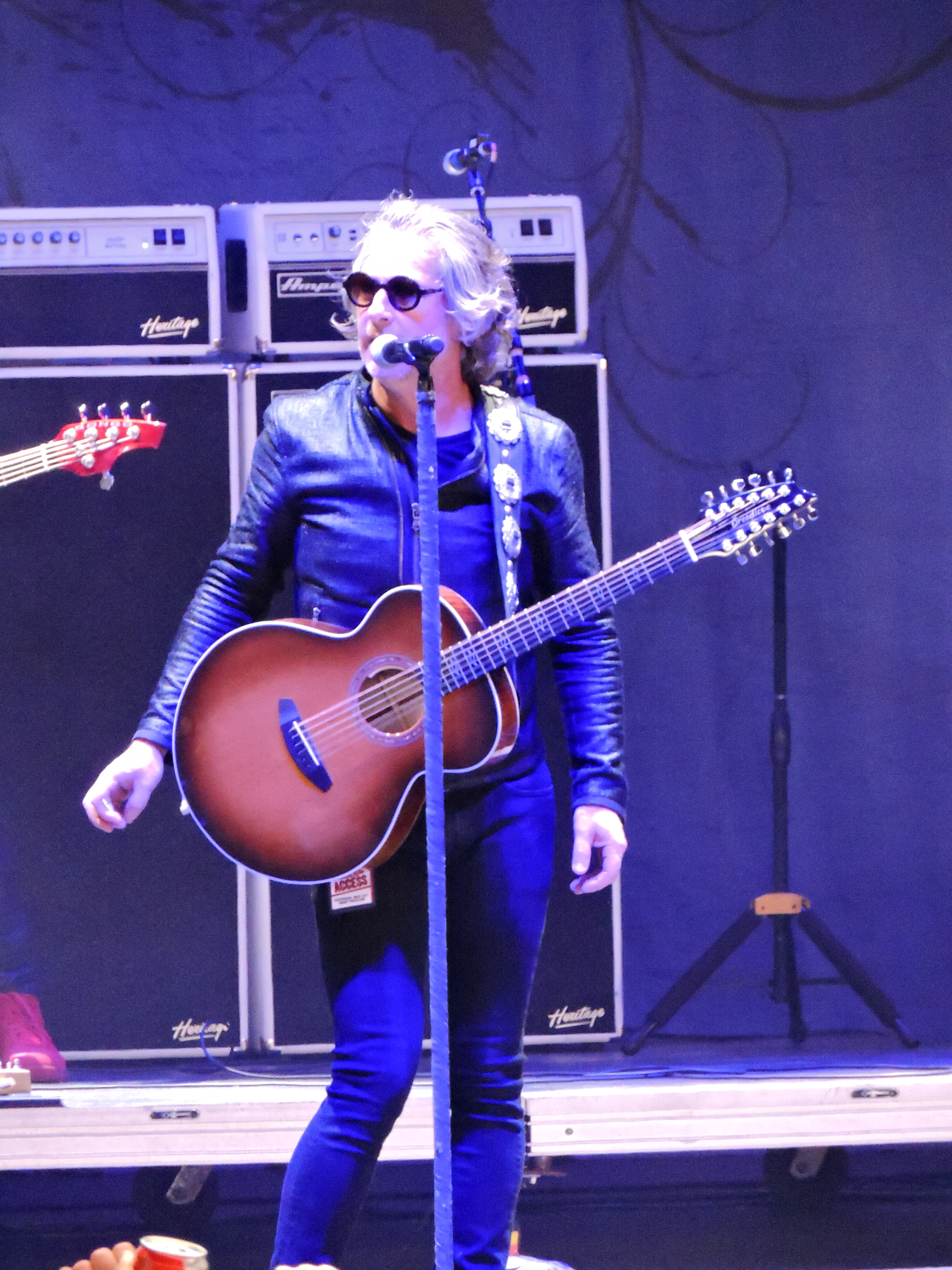
Ed Roland in 2016

The band's ninth studio album, See What You Started by Continuing, was released on October 2, 2015, by Vanguard Records and peaked at No. 25 on the Billboard 200. The album's lead single, "This", made its premiere on July 15, 2015, at USA Today. The band then made the single as a free download on their official website. The band's live album, Collective Soul: Live, was released on December 8, 2017, by Suretone Records. The recordings were selected by the band as their best over the course of 160 shows they performed in two years. Around this time, Collective Soul changed the name of their label from El Music Group to Fuzze-Flex Records.

In 2018, the band joined 3 Doors Down to co-headline the Rock & Roll Express Tour, with support from Soul Asylum. In 2019 the band headlined the Now's the Time Tour to celebrate their 25th anniversary, with support from Gin Blossoms.

The band's tenth studio album, Blood, was released on June 21, 2019, and it peaked at No. 4 on the Billboard Top Independent Albums chart. Blood was originally meant to be a double album but the band's management had talked them out of releasing it as such. After a 14-year absence, the lead single "Right as Rain" marked the band's return to the Mainstream Rock chart, as it peaked at the No. 32 spot. In August 2020, the band released a Record Store Day exclusive vinyl called Half & Half featuring two cover songs ("Opera Star" and "One I Love") and two original songs ("Let Her Out" and "Back Again").

=== 2021–present: Vibrating, Here to Eternity, documentary, and Touch and Go ===
In 2021 and 2022, Collective Soul released the singles "All Our Pieces" and "Cut the Cord", which were taken from the band's then-upcoming album. Both songs were accompanied by music videos and lyric videos. Collective Soul's eleventh studio album, Vibrating, was then released on August 12, 2022. Initially, songs on Vibrating were due to be released as part of the 2019 Blood album, but the band's management discouraged the double album concept.

In February 2024, Collective Soul announced a double album titled Here to Eternity. It was recorded at the estate of Elvis Presley in Palm Springs, CA. A nationwide tour was also announced in support of the album, alongside Hootie & the Blowfish and Edwin McCain. The album was released on May 17, 2024. A documentary about the band, Give Me a Word: The Collective Soul Story, was released on July 8, 2025. It was directed by Joseph Rubinstein and produced by Jonathan Sheldon (from the production company Pfonetic) and Greg Richling (former member of The Wallflowers). The documentary covered the band's entire career with participation from various Collective Soul members.

Collective Soul's 13th studio album, Touch and Go, was announced in early 2026. Touch and Go was released on April 18, 2026 (Record Store Day). The release was restricted to vinyl only, with other physical and digital editions delayed until later in 2026.

== Awards & nominations ==
| Award | Year | Nominee(s) | Category | Result | Ref. |
|---|---|---|---|---|---|
| ASCAP Pop Music Awards | 1996 | "Shine" | Most Performed Song | Won | |
| BMI Pop Awards | 2020 | "Shine" | Million-Air Award | Won | |
| BMI Pop Awards | 2020 | "December" | Million-Air Award | Won | |
| BMI Pop Awards | 2020 | "The World I Know" | Million-Air Award | Won | |
| Billboard Music Awards | 1994 | "Shine" | Top Rock Song | Won | |
| Billboard Music Awards | 1995 | "December" | Top Rock Song | Won | |
| Billboard Music Awards | 1995 | Themselves | Top Rock Artist | Nominated | |
| Billboard Music Awards | 1999 | Themselves | Top Rock Artist | Nominated | |
| Billboard Music Awards | 1999 | "Heavy" | Top Rock Song | Nominated | |

== Band members ==
Current members

- Ed Roland – lead vocals, additional guitar, keyboards (1992–present)
- Dean Roland – rhythm guitar (1992–present)
- Will Turpin – bass, backing vocals, auxiliary percussion (1994–present)
- Johnny Rabb – drums, percussion, backing vocals (2012–present)
- Jesse Triplett – lead guitar, backing vocals (2014–present)

Former members

- David Neal – bass (1992–1994)
- Ross Childress – lead guitar, backing vocals (1992–2001)
- Shane Evans – drums, percussion (1992–2005, guest 2009)
- Joel Kosche – lead guitar, backing vocals (2001–2014)
- Ryan Hoyle – drums, percussion (2005–2008)
- Cheney Brannon – drums, percussion (2008–2012)

Former touring musicians

- Matt Serletic – keyboards, auxiliary percussion (1994–1995)

== Discography ==
Studio albums

- Hints Allegations and Things Left Unsaid (1993)
- Collective Soul (1995)
- Disciplined Breakdown (1997)
- Dosage (1999)
- Blender (2000)
- Youth (2004)
- Afterwords (2007)
- Rabbit (2009)
- See What You Started by Continuing (2015)
- Blood (2019)
- Vibrating (2022)
- Here to Eternity (2024)
- Touch and Go (2026)

== See also ==
- List of alternative rock artists
- List of artists who reached number one on the U.S. Mainstream Rock chart
- List of Atlantic Records artists
- List of hard rock musicians
- List of post-grunge bands
