= Dean Roland =

American musician and songwriter

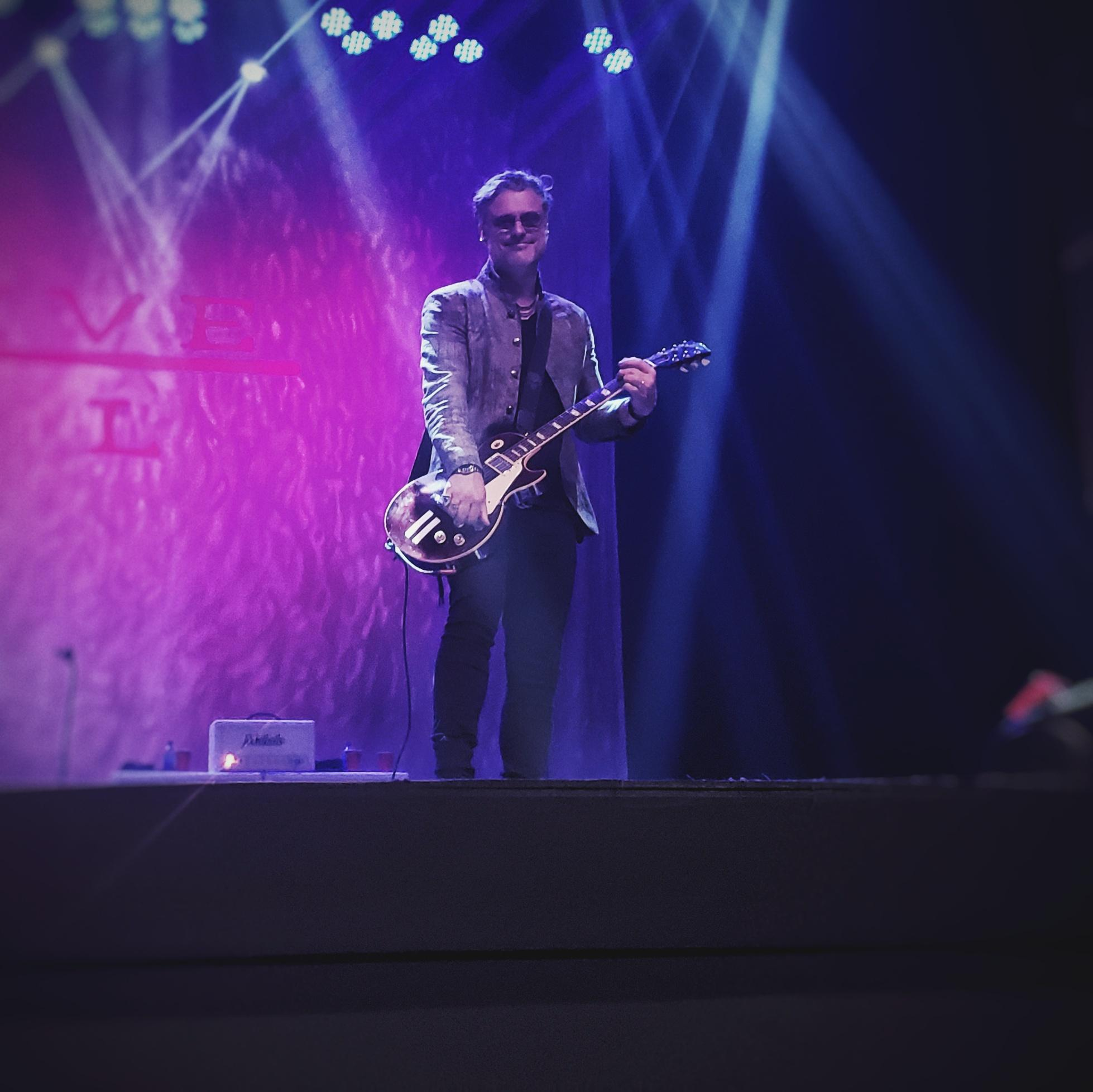
- Roland at the Coca-Cola Roxy in Cumberland, Georgia (2021)
- Born: Michael Dean Roland
- Occupations: Musician; songwriter
- Years active: 1992–present
- Relatives: Ed Roland (brother)
- Musical career
- Origin: Stockbridge, Georgia, U.S.
- Genres: Alternative rock; hard rock; post-grunge; rock
- Instruments: Rhythm guitar; keyboards; vocals
- Website: collectivesoul.com

Michael Dean Roland is an American musician and songwriter. He is best known for being the rhythm guitarist of the band Collective Soul, an alternative rock band fronted by his brother Ed. He is also part of the rock duo Magnets & Ghosts alongside Ryan Potesta.

== Discography ==
With Collective Soul

- Hints, Allegations, and Things Left Unsaid (1994)
- Collective Soul (Blue Album) (1995)
- Disciplined Breakdown (1997)
- Dosage (1999)
- Blender (2000)
- Youth (2004)
- From the Ground Up (2005)
- Home (2006)
- Afterwords (2008)
- Collective Soul (The Rabbit) (2009)
- See What You Started By Continuing (2015)
- Live (2017)
- Blood (2019)
- Half & Half (2020)
- Vibrating (2022)

With Magnets & Ghosts

- Mass (2011)
- Be Born (2014)
- Space Time Gender (2018)
