= Ed Roland =

American singer (born 1963)

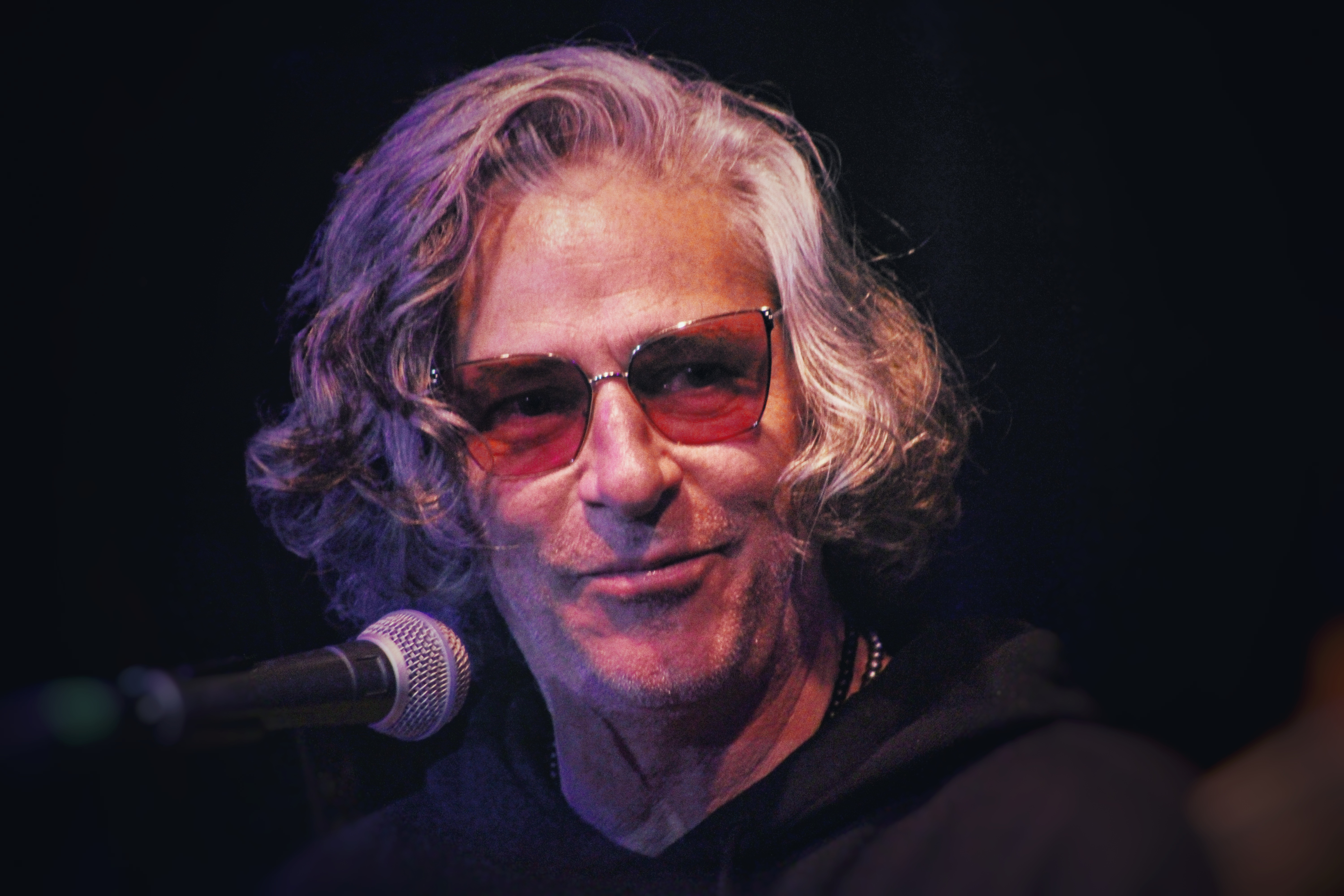
- Roland in 2021
- Occupations: Singer; musician; songwriter; record producer
- Years active: 1985–present
- Spouse: Michaeline Matteson (m. 2006)
- Relatives: Dean Roland (brother)
- Musical career
- Origin: Stockbridge, Georgia, U.S.
- Genres: Alternative rock; hard rock; post-grunge; rock
- Instruments: Vocals; guitar; keyboards
- Member of: Collective Soul; Ed Roland and the Sweet Tea Project
- Website: collectivesoul.com

Ed Roland is an American singer-songwriter and musician. He is the lead vocalist and primary songwriter of the rock band Collective Soul, along with his brother Dean, who also served as the band's rhythm guitarist. He is also active with his side project, Ed Roland and the Sweet Tea Project.

== Career ==
One of the first records that influenced Roland to explore rock music was Elton John's Greatest Hits, which he purchased as a child. After finishing high school, Roland studied songwriting and guitar at Berklee College of Music in Boston for one year. He was the lead engineer and producer at Real 2 Reel Studios in Stockbridge, Georgia for eight years. In 1985, he joined a band called Ed-E and another during the late 1980s and early 1990s called Marching Two-Step. Marching Two-Step included future producer and music executive Matt Serletic, future executive Michelle Rhea Caplinger and longtime Collective Soul drummer Shane Evans. Roland released an indie album called Ed-E Roland in 1991, under the independent label Core, to showcase his abilities to compose, record, and produce his own original music.

After using the name Brothers & Brides briefly, Roland changed the name of his band to Collective Soul with hopes of finding success in the music business. Not finding success, however, Roland became frustrated and almost gave up on the music industry. He had been active in the local Georgia music scene since the early 1980s. Despite the initial rejections, Collective Soul independently released Hints, Allegations & Things Left Unsaid in 1993 on an independent label called Rising Storm. It was a compilation of some of Roland's songwriting demos created when he worked at Real 2 Reel Studios.

This collection eventually caught the attention of WJRR 101.1 in Orlando, Florida. Several other college radio stations began to play "Shine" and it became an underground hit. The popularity of the song and band was convincing enough that Atlantic Records signed Collective Soul in 1993 to a long term major label contract. Hints Allegations and Things Left Unsaid was re-released worldwide in early 1994. The band experienced a sudden rise from obscurity to fame.

Roland's brother Dean is also a member of the band. Their father was a Southern Baptist minister which influenced their spiritual background; however, Roland has cited that Collective Soul is not a Christian rock band.

Roland formed a new act in 2011 with a group of friends and musicians, titled Ed Roland and the Sweet Tea Project. In 2012, the Sweet Tea Project's cover version of "Shelter from the Storm" was released on Chimes of Freedom: Songs of Bob Dylan Honoring 50 Years of Amnesty International, a four-disc compilation of Bob Dylan covers.

The Sweet Tea Project's debut album, Devils 'n Darlins, was released on September 3, 2013. The album's first single, "Love Won't Bring Us Down," was released on August 13. On October 6, 2017, Ed Roland and The Sweet Tea Project released their second album, Alder Lane Farm.

=== 2014–present: See What You Started by Continuing, Anniversary, Blood, and Vibrating ===
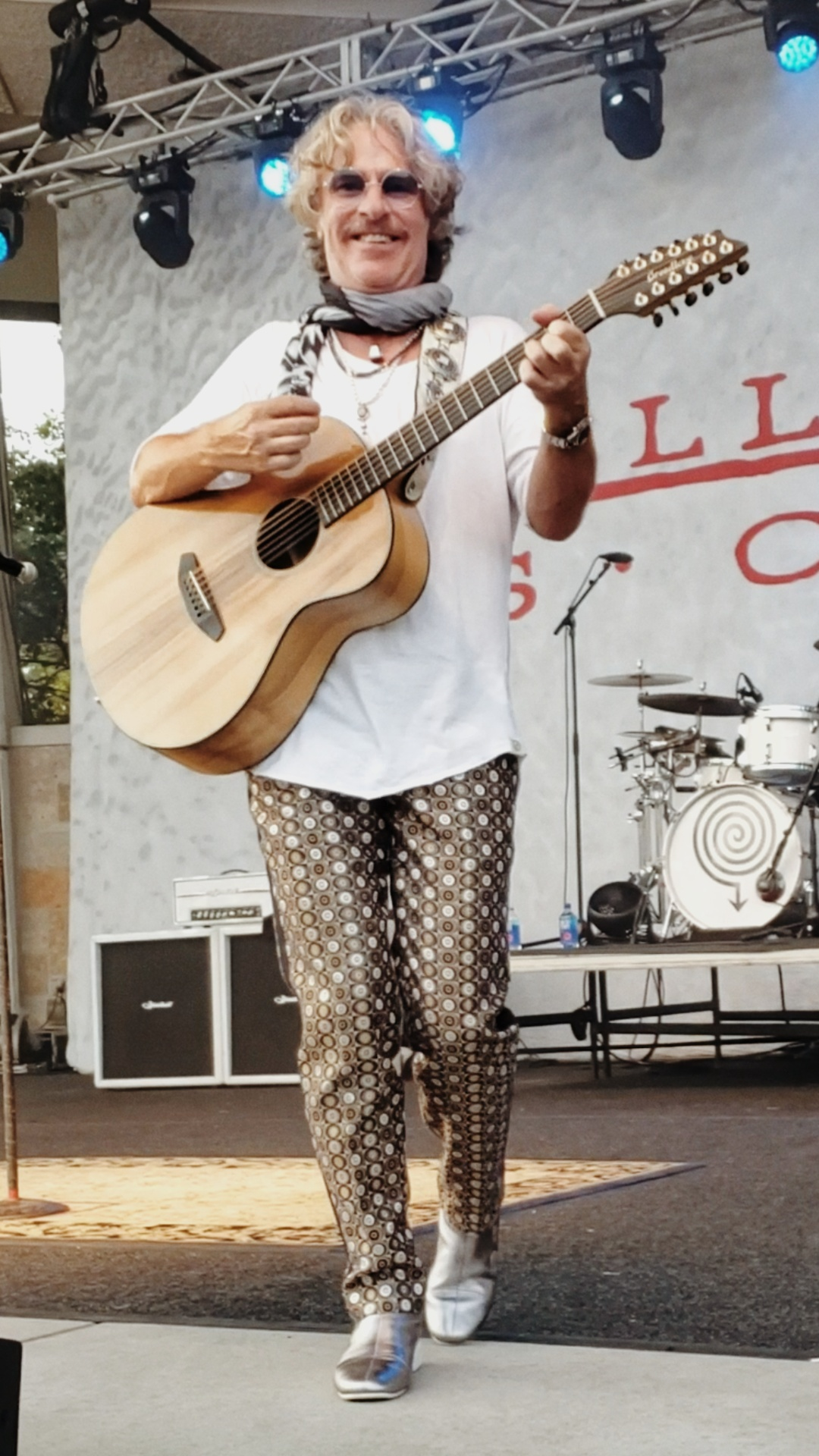
Roland performing in 2021

Between February and October 2014, Collective Soul recorded their ninth studio album, See What You Started by Continuing. The album was released on October 2, 2015, by Vanguard Records.

In December 2014, Roland recorded a solo album with current Collective Soul bandmates Will Turpin and Jesse Triplett, along with former Collective Soul drummer Shane Evans and guitarist Peter Stroud. The album, Anniversary, was dedicated to Roland's wife, Michaeline, to celebrate their 10-year wedding anniversary. Collective Soul's tenth studio album, Blood (Collective Soul album), was released in 2019. "Vibrating", their eleventh studio album, was supposed to release in 2019 along with Blood, but instead was released in 2022.

== Personal life ==
Roland met his wife Michaeline Matteson when she delivered football tickets to his Atlanta apartment. Initially, Roland was intrigued by her and insisted they meet up at a local restaurant. They bonded off their mutual love for family and Michaeline admired how "[He showed] integrity, generosity and loyalty to family over all the things that could have easily trumped his value system." After dating for three years, the couple married on February 17, 2006. The date is significant to Roland because of its close proximity to his father's birthday on February 18 and his parents' anniversary on February 19.

== See also ==
- List of lead vocalists
- List of people from Georgia (U.S. state)
