= List of Chinese films of 2011 =

The following is a list of mainland Chinese films first released in year 2011. There were 154 Chinese feature films released in China in 2011.

== Box office ==
These are the top 10 grossing Chinese films that were released in China in 2011:

Highest-grossing domestic films of 2011 in China
Rank	Title	Domestic gross
1	The Flowers of War	$93,590,000
2	Flying Swords of Dragon Gate	$84,430,000
3	The Founding of a Party	$61,290,000
4	Love is Not Blind	$55,440,000
5	Overheard 2	$34,850,000
6	Shaolin	$34,850,000
7	Eternal Moment	$33,270,000
8	The Sorcerer and the White Snake	$33,270,000
9	My Own Swordsman	$31,680,000
10	Mural	$30,100,000

== Films released ==
=== January–March ===
Opening		Title	Director	Cast	Genre	Notes	Ref.
J A N U A R Y	7	Out of Control	Ding Xiaoming	Hu Ming, Tan Zhou, Teddy Lin, Shi Liang, Duan Bowen	Thriller / Mystery / Crime		
J A N U A R Y	19	Shaolin	Benny Chan	Andy Lau, Nicholas Tse, Wu Jing, Jackie Chan, Xing Yu, Fan Bingbing, Xiaoliuna, Shi Xiaohong, Hung Yan-yan, Chen Zhihui	Action / Drama	Mainland-Hong Kong co-production	
J A N U A R Y	21	Moon Castle: The Space Adventure	James Choo	Zu Liqing, Zhang Lin, Deng Yuting, Liang Ying, Xie Weitong, Gao Quansheng, Zhao Na	Animation / Adventure / Comedy		
J A N U A R Y	21	My Garden of Eden	Sun Xian	Xu Jinglei, Ning Yuanyuan, Zhang Jiran	Documentary		
J A N U A R Y	26	My Own Swordsman	Shang Jing	Yan Ni, Yao Chen, Sha Yi, Yu Entai, Ni Hongjie, Jiang Chao, Xiao Jian, Fan Ming, Wu Ma, Yue Yueli, Lemon Zhang, Wang Lei, Wang Haoran	Comedy / Ancient-costume / Action		
J A N U A R Y	27	Old Master Q and Little Ocean Tiger	Hiroshi Fukutomi	Deng Chao, Liu Jinshan, Feng Shaofeng, Zhang Hanyu, Li Chen, Chai Kungyung, Elva Hsiao, Che Xiao, Huo Siyan, Miu Miu, Sha Yi, Zhang Junning, Dang Hao	Animation	China-Japan co-production	
J A N U A R Y	31	All's Well, Ends Well 2011	Chan Hing-ka, Janet Chun	Donnie Yen, Louis Koo, Carina Lau, Raymond Wong, Cecilia Cheung, Chapman To, Lynn Hung, Yan Ni	Romantic-comedy	Mainland-Hong Kong co-production	
F E B R U A R Y	3	Little Big Panda	Greg Manwaring	He Jiong, Liu Chunyan, Zhao Zhongxiang, Li Yang, Han Qiaosheng, Huang Jianxiang, Shi Banyu, Li Jing, Xie Na, Vega Ri, Cai Hong, Zhao Weizhi, Du Haitao, Wu Xin	Animation	China-Germany co-production	
F E B R U A R Y	3	Mr. & Mrs. Incredible	Vincent Kok	Louis Koo, Sandra Ng, Wen Zhang, Chapman To, Li Qin, Wang Bojie, Li Jing, He Yunwei, Wei Zhang, Wang Wenbo	Comedy	Mainland-Hong Kong co-production	
F E B R U A R Y	3	Under the Influence	Zhu Shimao	Zhu Shimao, Vivian Wu, Kimi, Kristy Yang, Liu Xin, Ying Da	Comedy / Drama		
F E B R U A R Y	3	What Women Want	Chen Daming	Andy Lau, Gong Li, Hu Jing, Kelly Hu, Russell Wong, Banny Chen	Romantic-comedy		
F E B R U A R Y	12	Eternal Moment	Zhang Yibai	Xu Jinglei, Li Yapeng, Chapman To, Wang Xuebing, Ning Hao, Zhao Wei, Xu Dongdong, He Jie	Romance		
F E B R U A R Y	13	Somebody to Love	Zhou Nan	Dennis Joseph O'Neil, Annie Wu, Li Feier, Wang Bojie, Vieven Liu, Chen Xiang, He Jiong, Ma Jingwu, Cao Yuan, Wang Sengui, Ren Zhong	Romance / Drama		
F E B R U A R Y	22	The Aroma City	Xu Chao, Chen Mingxin	Athena Chu, Zhaxi Dunzhu, Waise Lee, Cheung Tat-ming, Zhang Xuan, Dong Lifan, He Yang, Jing Gangshan	Drama		
F E B R U A R Y	26	Jin Men Xin Niang	Huang Dan	Tou Chung-hua, Wang Like, Chu Jiaqing	Drama / Romance		
M A R C H	4	Dream Girl	Yu Zhilin	Aixinjueluo Qixing, Dai Jiajia, Ma Yuhe, Wang Lihan, A Yi, Shi Xiaoman	Family / Drama		
M A R C H	4	Fatal Invitation	Sun Xiaoguang	Cheung Tat-ming, Jiao Ting, Hu Sang	Thriller		
M A R C H	8	Lost	Zhou Xiaowen	Wang Zitong, Lü Liping, Zhao Yaqi, Wang Ziheng, Ye Ye, Dong Lide, Li Liang	Drama		
M A R C H	8	Sweet Journey	Yan Ran	Zhang Hanyu, Yu Na, Xiao Jian, A Youduo	Drama / Comedy		
M A R C H	8	Together	Yan Ran	Ni Dahong, Daniel Chan, Li Feier, Li Yu	Drama / Mystery		
M A R C H	10	Sky Fighters	Ning Haiqiang	Wang Ban, Li Guangjie, Huang Yi, Hu Ke, Zhu Xinyun, Ning Ning, Zhang Ningjiang, Zhang Yechuan, Yang Xiao	Drama / Action		
M A R C H	11	Big Big Man	Tan Hua	Yang Lele, Ng Man-tat, Li Boqing, Liao Jian, Lam Chi-chung	Comedy		
M A R C H	11	Stand Up	Min Hui	Song Xuewen, Wang Wei, Du Xiaoguang, Gao Xiufeng, Yao Jinfei	Drama		
M A R C H	12	Through Stunning Storms	An Zhanjun	Xu Seng, Guo Ge, Liu Jian, Guo Dongwen, Gao Zifeng	War / Drama		
M A R C H	16	Hometown Boy	Yao Hung-i	Liu Xiaodong	Documentary		
M A R C H	20	The Story of a Piano	Zhou Wei	Gao Shuguang, Vivian Wu, Wu Zhenlin, Ma Shuliang, Wang Dongfang, Gao Yalin, Du Jianqiao, Li Si-cheng	Drama		
M A R C H	22	House Mania	Sun Da	Zhao Yi, Li Nian, Li Jing, He Yunwei, Fang Qingzhuo, Chen Yufan, Jiang Chao, Yan Guan-ying, Wu Chao, Zhang Dali, Li Qinqin, Zhang Shaohua, Chen Youwang, Gan Lulu	Comedy / Romance		
M A R C H	25	The Man Behind the Courtyard House	Fei Xing	Simon Yam, Zhang Jingchu, Huang Shengyi, Hao Lei, Yu Shaoqun, Chen Sicheng, Wei Zi, Shi Zhaoqi, Du Xiaoting	Crime / Thriller / Mystery		
M A R C H	30	Children from the Distant Planet	Shen Ko-shang	Zhou Xun, Chen Kun	Documentary		

=== April–June ===
Opening		Title	Director	Cast	Genre	Notes	Ref.
A P R I L	8	The Law of Attraction	Zhao Tianyu	Karen Mok, Zhang Jingchu, Guo Tao, Leon Dai, Wen Zhang, Bai Baihe, Huang Huan, Duan Bowen, Che Yongli	Romance / Mystery / Comedy		
A P R I L	8	Mr. and Mrs. Single	Patrick Kong	Eason Chan, Rene Liu, Harlem Yu, Bai Bing, Lin Yilun, Qin Lan, Chen Hao, Monica Mok, Shi Tianshuo, Gao Jie	Romance / Comedy		
A P R I L	12	The Warring States	Chen Jin	Sun Honglei, Jing Tian, Francis Ng, Kim Hee-sun, Kiichi Nakai, Jiang Wu	Historical War		
A P R I L	19	A Chinese Ghost Story	Wilson Yip	Louis Koo, Liu Yifei, Yu Shaoqun, Kara Hui, Louis Fan, Elvis Tsui, Wang Danyi Li, Gong Xinliang, Lin Peng, Li Jing	Fantasy / Romance / Drama	Mainland-Hong Kong co-production	
M A Y	10	Love for Life	Gu Changwei	Aaron Kwok, Zhang Ziyi, Pu Cunxin, Jiang Wenli, Li Danyang, Tao Zeru, Cai Guoqing, Wang Baoqiang	Drama / Romance		
M A Y	13	A Beautiful Life	Andrew Lau	Shu Qi, Liu Ye, Tian Liang, Feng Danying, Sa Rina, Zhang Songwen, Gao Tian, Anthony Wong	Romance / Drama	Mainland-Hong Kong co-production	
M A Y	27	Where are You From?	Jiang Xu	Kristy Yang, Pan Yang, Michael Tong, Li Siyu, Miao Haojun, Zhang Li, Yao Di, Na Wei	Comedy / Romance / Drama		
J U N E	24	Snow Flower and the Secret Fan	Wayne Wang	Li Bingbing, Jun Ji-hyun, Vivian Wu, Hugh Jackman, Archie Kao, Jiang Wu	Drama / History	China-United States co-production	

=== July–September ===
Opening		Title	Director	Cast	Genre	Notes	Ref.
J U L Y	4	Wu Xia	Peter Chan	Donnie Yen, Takeshi Kaneshiro, Tang Wei, Jimmy Wang, Kara Hui, Li Xiaoran, Jiang Wu	Martial Arts / Thriller	Mainland-Hong Kong co-production	
J U L Y	8	Mysterious Island	Rico Chung	Jordan Chan, Yang Mi, Hayama Hiro, Janel Tsai, Wong You-nam, Tsui Ting-yau, Anya, Shaun Tam, Lee Man-kwan, Xu Zixian	Horror / Thriller		
J U L Y	15	Coming Back	Li Yuan	Simon Yam, Annie Yi, Qi Wei, Shang Wenjie, Cheng Pei-pei, Jack Kao, Wang Daqi, Bai Hongbiao	Action / Comedy / Crime	Mainland-Hong Kong-Taiwan co-production	
J U L Y	15	To Love or Not	Jiang Cheng	Alex Fong, Li Xiaoran, Kathy Chow, Song Xiaoying, Ding Yongdai	Romance / Drama		
A U G U S T	18	Overheard 2	Alan Mak, Felix Chong	Louis Koo, Lau Ching-wan, Daniel Wu, Michelle Ye, Huang Yi, Wilfred Lau, Kenneth Tsang, Wu Fung, Felix Lok, Kong Ngai, Alex Fong	Crime / Thriller	Mainland-Hong Kong co-production	
S E P T E M B E R	8	Love in Space	Tony Chan, Wing Shya	Aaron Kwok, Eason Chan, Rene Liu, Gwei Lun-mei, Angelababy, Jing Boran, Xu Fan	Romance / Comedy	Mainland-Hong Kong co-production	
S E P T E M B E R	9	My Kingdom	Gao Xiaosong	Wu Chun, Han Geng, Barbie Shu, Louis Liu, Yuen Biao, Yu Rongguang, Annie Yi	Action / Romance / Drama		
S E P T E M B E R	15	72 Heroes	Chiu Sung-kee	Tse Kwan-ho, Zhao Bingrui, Elanne Kong, Liu Kai-chi, Irene Wan, Eric Tsang, Alan Tam	Drama / War / History	Mainland-Hong Kong co-production	
S E P T E M B E R	15	One Wrong Step	Jiang Tao	Sha Yi, Ye Qing, Wu Weidong, Wang Weini, Wei Ran, Qu Ying, Qi Bing	Mystery / Comedy		
S E P T E M B E R	16	The Land with No Boundary	Xu Zimu	Kenny Bee, Gan Wei, Lam Suet, Patrick Tam, Tsang Wai-dick, Xiong Naijin, Mark Cheng, Tse Kwan-ho, Du Xiaomi, Rain Li	Fantasy / Romance		
S E P T E M B E R	23	1911	Jackie Chan, Zhang Li	Jackie Chan, Winston Chao, Li Bingbing, Jaycee Chan, Joan Chen, Hu Ge, Sun Chun, Yu Shaoqun, Huang Zhizhong, Jiang Wu, Ning Jing, Jiang Wenli, Mei Ting	Historical / Drama	Tribute to the 100th anniversary of the Xinhai Revolution; Mainland-Hong Kong co-production	
S E P T E M B E R	23	Cool Young	Zhao Yanguozhang	Zhao Yanguozhang, Wang Ziwen, Zhang Jin, Zhou Muyang, Zhao Yanan, Yan Junxi, Wang Yuzhong, Wang Lele	Drama / Romance		
S E P T E M B E R	23	The Purple House	Poon Hang-sang	Jiro Wang, Tong Liya, Xiao Yuyu, Zhong Kai, Michael Tong, Tse Kwan-ho, Zhao Jin, Tong Chenjie, Xu Yulan, He Jingjing	Romance / Thriller		
S E P T E M B E R	28	The Sorcerer and the White Snake	Ching Siu-tung	Jet Li, Huang Shengyi, Raymond Lam, Charlene Choi, Wen Zhang, Jiang Wu, Vivian Hsu, Miriam Yeung, Chapman To, Law Kar-ying, Lam Suet, Sonija Kwok, Angela Tong, Michelle Wai	Romance / Fantasy	Mainland-Hong Kong co-production	
S E P T E M B E R	29	Mural	Gordon Chan	Deng Chao, Betty Sun, Yan Ni, Collin Chou, Zheng Shuang, Eric Tsang, Andy On, Monica Mok	Fantasy / Romance / Action	Mainland-Hong Kong co-production	
S E P T E M B E R	30	The Dragon Knight	Shengjun Yu		Animation		
S E P T E M B E R	30	Love You You	Jingle Ma	Eddie Peng, Angelababy, Zhu Yuchen, Zhou Yang, He Jie	Romance / Comedy		

=== October–December ===
Opening		Title	Director	Cast	Genre	Notes	Ref.
O C T O B E R	13	The Woman Knight of Mirror Lake	Herman Yau	Huang Yi, Dennis To, Kevin Cheng, Anthony Wong, Pat Ha, Lam Suet, Rose Chan	Drama / Biography / Action	Mainland-Hong Kong co-production	
N O V E M B E R	8	Love is Not Blind	Teng Huatao	Wen Zhang, Bai Baihe, Zhang Jiayi, Zhang Zixuan, Wang Yaoqing, Guo Jingfei, Hai Qing, Liao Fan, Li Nian	Romance / Comedy / Drama		
N O V E M B E R	10	The Resistance	Peng Zhang Li	Hu Sang, Peng Zhang Li, Johan Karlberg, Jeremy Marr Williams, Zhao Jiuyi	Martial Art / Action	China	
N O V E M B E R	18	Legendary Amazons	Frankie Chan	Cecilia Cheung, Richie Ren, Liu Xiaoqing, Cheng Pei-pei, Kathy Chow, Chen Zihan, Jin Qiaoqiao	Historical / War	Mainland-Hong Kong co-production	
N O V E M B E R	29	White Vengeance	Daniel Lee	Leon Lai, Feng Shaofeng, Zhang Hanyu, Anthony Wong, Liu Yifei, Jordan Chan, Andy On, Xiu Qing, Ding Haifeng, Wu Ma	Historical / War	Mainland-Hong Kong co-production	
D E C E M B E R	2	A Big Deal	Ma Liwen	Han Chae-young, Chapman To, Lan Zheng-long, Kimi, Andy Hui, Huang Ling	Comedy / Romance / Adventure		
D E C E M B E R	2	Cold Steel	David Wu	Peter Ho, Tony Leung Ka-fai, Song Jia	Action / Romance		
D E C E M B E R	2	Here, There	Lu Sheng	Lu Yulai, Huang Lu, Yao Anlian, Wang Deshun	Drama		
D E C E M B E R	2	Racer Legend	Norman Luo, Han Zhixia	Shawn Dou, Janine Chang, Wang Bojie, Eric Tsang, Zhang Xiyun	Action / Romance / Drama		
D E C E M B E R	15	The Flowers of War	Zhang Yimou	Christian Bale, Ni Ni, Zhang Xinyi, Tong Dawei, Atsuro Watabe, Shigeo Kobayashi	Historical drama / War	selected as the Chinese entry for the 84th Academy Awards for Best Foreign Language Film in 2011.	
D E C E M B E R	15	Flying Swords of Dragon Gate	Tsui Hark	Jet Li, Zhou Xun, Chen Kun, Li Yuchun, Gwei Lun-mei, Louis Fan, Mavis Fan	Wuxia	Mainland-Hong Kong co-production	
D E C E M B E R	23	Dear Enemy	Xu Jinglei	Xu Jinglei, Stanley Huang, Gigi Leung, Aarif Rahman, Christy Chung, Zhao Baogang	Drama / Romance / Comedy		
D E C E M B E R	27	Speed Angels	Jingle Ma	Rene Liu, Tang Wei, Cecilia Cheung, Jimmy Lin	Action / Romance / Drama		

== See also ==
- List of Chinese films of 2010
- List of Chinese films of 2012
