= List of action films of the 2010s =

This is chronological list of action films originally released in the 2010s. Often there may be considerable overlap particularly between action and other genres (including horror, comedy and science fiction films); the list should attempt to document films which are more closely related to action, even if they blend genres.

== 2010 ==
Title	Director	Cast	Country	Subgenre/notes
2010
13 Assassins	Takashi Miike	Kōji Yakusho, Takayuki Yamada, Yusuke Iseya	Japan	Martial arts
14 Blades	Daniel Lee	Donnie Yen, Zhao Wei, Wu Chun	China; Hong Kong	Martial arts
22 Bullets	Richard Berry	Jean Reno, Kad Merad, Richard Berry	France	Action thriller
Alien vs Ninja	Seiji Chiba	Masanori Mimoto, Mika Hijii, Shuji Kashiwabara	Japan	
The A-Team	Joe Carnahan	Liam Neeson, Bradley Cooper, Quinton Jackson	United States	
Bad Blood	Dennis Law	Simon Yam, Bernice Liu, Andy On	Hong Kong	
Bangkok Knockout	Panna Rittikrai	Sorapong Chatree, Supaksorn Chaimongkol, Kiattisak Udomnak	Thailand	
Batman: Under the Red Hood	Brandon Vietti	Bruce Greenwood, Jensen Ackles, John DiMaggio	United States	Animated superhero film
Blades of Blood	Lee Joon-ik	Cha Seung-won, Hwang Jung-min, Baek Sung-hyun	South Korea	
The Book of Eli	Albert Hughes, Allen Hughes	Denzel Washington, Gary Oldman, Mila Kunis	United States	
The Bounty Hunter	Andy Tennant	Jennifer Aniston, Gerard Butler, Giovanni Perez	United States	Action comedy
The Butcher, the Chef and the Swordsman	Wuershan	Masanobu Andō, Kitty Zhang, You Benchang	China; United States; Hong Kong	
Cop Out	Kevin Smith	Bruce Willis, Tracy Morgan, Seann William Scott	United States	Action comedy
Centurion	Neil Marshall	Michael Fassbender, Olga Kurylenko, Dominic West	United Kingdom	
City Under Siege	Benny Chan		Hong Kong	
Clash of the Titans	Louis Leterrier	Sam Worthington, Mads Mikkelsen, Ralph Fiennes, Liam Neeson	United States; Australia	Fantasy action
The Crazies	Breck Eisner	Timothy Olyphant, Radha Mitchell, Danielle Panabaker	United States	Action thriller
Death Race 2	Roel Reiné	Luke Goss, Frederick Koehler, Tanit Phoenix, Robin Shou, Ving Rhames, Sean Bean	United States	Science fiction action
Dante's Inferno: An Animated Epic	Mike Disa, Shukō Murase, Yosuomi Umetsu	Steve Blum, Graham McTavish, Peter Jessop	Japan	Animated film
Date Night	Shawn Levy	Steve Carell, Tina Fey, Mark Wahlberg	United States	Action comedy
The Expendables	Sylvester Stallone	Sylvester Stallone, Jason Statham, Jet Li	United States	
Faster	George Tillman Jr.	Dwayne Johnson, Maggie Grace, Billy Bob Thornton	United States	
Fire of Conscience	Dante Lam		Hong Kong	
From Paris With Love	Pierre Morel	John Travolta, Jonathan Rhys Meyers, Kasia Smutniak	France; United States	
Gallants	Derek Kwok, Clement Cheng	Leung Siu-lung, Chen Kuan-tai, Teddy Robin	Hong Kong	
Gothic & Lolita Psycho	Go Ohara	Rina Akiyama	Japan	
Hunt to Kill	Keoni Waxman	Steve Austin, Gary Daniels, Eric Roberts	Canada	
Inception	Christopher Nolan	Leonardo DiCaprio, Joseph Gordon-Levitt	United States	Science fiction action
Ip Man 2	Wilson Yip	Donnie Yen, Sammo Hung, Fan Siu-Wong, Huang Xiaoming	Hong Kong	
Iron Man 2	Jon Favreau	Robert Downey Jr., Scarlett Johansson, Don Cheadle	United States	
Just Call Me Nobody	Kevin Chu	Xiao Shen Yang, Kelly Lin, Banny Chen	Taiwan; China	
Justice League: Crisis on Two Earths	Lauren Montgomery, Sam Liu	William Baldwin, Mark Harmon, Chris Noth	United States	Animated superhero film
Kick-Ass	Matthew Vaughn	Nicolas Cage, Mark Strong, Christopher Mintz-Plasse	United States	
Killers	Robert Luketic	Ashton Kutcher, Katherine Heigl, Tom Selleck	United States	
The King of Fighters	Gordon Chan	Maggie Q, Sean Faris, Will Yun Lee	Japan; Taiwan; United States; Germany	
Knight and Day	James Mangold	Tom Cruise, Cameron Diaz, Peter Sarsgaard	United States	
The Last Airbender	M. Night Shyamalan	Noah Ringer, Nicola Peltz, Jackson Rathbone	United States	Martial arts film
Last Kung Fu Monk	Peng Zhang Li	Peng Zhang Li, Hu Sang, Kristen Dougherty, Johan Karlberg, Justin Morck, Binglei Li	China; United States	Action Adventure Martial arts film
The Legend Is Born – Ip Man	Herman Yau		Hong Kong	
Let the Bullets Fly	Jiang Wen	Chow Yun-fat, Jiang Wen, Ge You	China; Hong Kong	
Little Big Soldier	Sheng Ding	Jackie Chan, Wang Lee Hom, Du Yuming	Hong Kong; China	
The Losers	Sylvain White	Jeffrey Dean Morgan, Chris Evans, Jason Patric	United States	
MacGruber	Jorma Taccone	Will Forte, Ryan Phillippe, Kristen Wiig	United States	Action comedy
Machete	Robert Rodriguez, Ethan Maniquis	Danny Trejo, Robert De Niro, Jessica Alba	United States	
The Man from Nowhere	Lee Jeong-beom	Won Bin, Kim Sae-on	South Korea	Action thriller
Mutant Girls Squad	Noboru Iguchi, Yoshihiro Nishimura, Tak Sakaguchi	Yumi Sugimoto, Yuko Takayama, Suzuka Morita	Japan	
Ong Bak 3	Tony Jaa, Panna Rittikrai	Tony Jaa, Primrata Det-Udom, Dan Chupong	Thailand	
Operation: Endgame	Fouad Mikati	Joe Anderson, Ellen Barkin, Ving Rhames	United States	Action comedy
The Other Guys	Adam McKay	Will Ferrell, Mark Wahlberg, Dwayne Johnson	United States	
Piranha 3D	Alexandre Aja	Elisabeth Shue, Adam Scott, Jerry O'Connell	United States	Action thriller
Point Blank	Fred Cavayé	Gilles Lellouche, Roschdy Zem, Gérard Lanvin	France	Action thriller
Predators	Nimród Antal	Adrien Brody, Alice Braga, Danny Trejo	United States	
Red	Robert Schwentke	Bruce Willis, Morgan Freeman, John Malkovich	United States	
The Red Eagle	Wisit Sasanatieng	Ananda Everingham, Yarinda Bunnag, Pornwut Sarasin	Thailand	
Red: Werewolf Hunter	Sheldon Wilson	Felicia Day, Kavan Smith, Steven McHattie	Canada	Action horror
Reign of Assassins	John Woo, Su Chao-Pin	Michelle Yeoh, Jung Woo-Sung, Wang Xueqi	China	
Repo Men	Miguel Sapochnik	Jude Law, Forest Whitaker, Alice Braga	United States	Science fiction action
Resident Evil: Afterlife	Paul W. S. Anderson	Milla Jovovich, Ali Larter, Wentworth Miller	Germany; United Kingdom; Canada; France	Science fiction action
Salt	Phillip Noyce	Angelina Jolie, Liev Schreiber, Chiwetel Ejiofor	United States	
Scott Pilgrim vs. the World	Edgar Wright	Michael Cera, Mary Elizabeth Winstead, Kieran Culkin	United States	Action comedy
Shank	Mo Ali	Kedar Williams-Stirling, Bashy, Adam Deacon, Kaya Scodelario	United Kingdom	
Sinners and Saints	William Kaufman	Johnny Strong, Sean Patrick Flanery, Kevin Phillips	United States	Action thriller
Smokin' Aces 2: Assassins' Ball	P. J. Pesce	Tom Berenger, Clayne Crawford, Tommy Flanagan	United States	
The Spy Next Door	Brian Levant	Jackie Chan, Amber Valletta, Madeline Carroll	United States	Action comedy
Stake Land	Jim Mickle	Connor Paolo, Nick Damici, Kelly McGillis	United States	Action thriller
The Stool Pigeon	Dante Lam	Nick Cheung, Nicholas Tse, Gwei Lun-mei	China; Hong Kong	
Superman/Batman: Apocalypse	Lauren Montgomery	Kevin Conroy, Tim Daly, Summer Glau	United States	Animated superhero film
Takers	John Luessenhop	Matt Dillon, Paul Walker, Idris Elba	United States	Heist action thriller
Tekken	Dwight H. Little	Luke Goss, Cary-Hiroyuki Tagawa	United States	
Triple Tap	Yee Tung-Shing		Hong Kong	
True Legend	Yuen Woo Ping	Vincent Zhao, Zhou Xun, Andy On	Hong Kong; China	
Undisputed III: Redemption	Isaac Florentine	Scott Adkins, Marko Zaror, Mark Ivanir	United States	Martial arts film
Unstoppable	Tony Scott	Denzel Washington, Chris Pine, Rosario Dawson	United States	
Vampire Warriors	Dennis Law	Yuen Wah, Jiang Luxia, Chrissie Chau	Hong Kong	
The Warrior's Way	Sngmoo Lee	Jang Dong-gun, Kate Bosworth, Danny Huston	New Zealand	
Yamada: The Samurai of Ayothaya	Nopporn Watin	Sorapong Chatree, Kanokkorn Jaicheun, Buakaw Banchamek	Thailand	Martial arts film
The Yellow Sea	Na Hong-jin	Ha Jung-woo, Kim Yoon-seok, Jo Sung-ha	South Korea	
Zebraman 2: Attack on Zebra City	Takashi Miike		Japan	

== 2011 ==
Title	Director	Cast	Country	Subgenre/notes
2011
30 Minutes or Less	Ruben Fleischer	Jesse Eisenberg, Danny McBride, Aziz Ansari	United States	Action comedy
All-Star Superman	Sam Liu	James Denton, Christina Hendricks, Anthony LaPaglia	United States	
All Superheroes Must Die	Jason Trost	Jason Trost, Lucas Till, James Remar	United States	Superhero film
Attack the Block	Joe Cornish	Jodie Whittaker, John Boyega, Alex Esmail	United Kingdom	
Amsterdam Heavy	Michael Wright	Michael Madsen, Alison Carroll, Alistair Overeem, Semmy Schilt	Netherlands	
Bangkok Revenge	Jean-Marc Minéo	Jon Foo, Caroline Ducey, Michaël Cohen	Thailand	Martial arts film
Batman: Year One	Sam Liu	Bryan Cranston, Ben McKenzie, Eliza Dushku	United States	Animated superhero film
Battle: Los Angeles	Jonathan Liebesman	Aaron Eckhart, Michelle Rodriguez, Bridget Moynahan, Ramón Rodríguez	United States	
Battlefield Heroes	Lee Joon-ik	Jung Jin-young, Lee Moon-sik, Ryu Seung-ryong	South Korea	
Bbuddah... Hoga Terra Baap	Poori Jagannath	Amitabh Bachchan, Hema Malini, Raveena Tandon	India	
Bodyguard	Siddique	Salman Khan, Kareena Kapoor, Raj Babbar	India	
Captain America: The First Avenger	Joe Johnston	Chris Evans, Hugo Weaving, Tommy Lee Jones	United States	
Colombiana	Olivier Megaton	Zoe Saldaña, Jordi Mollà, Michael Vartan	France	
Conan the Barbarian	Marcus Nispel	Jason Momoa, Stephen Lang, Rachel Nichols	United States	
Countdown	Huh Jong-ho	Jung Jae-young, Jeon Do-yeon, Lee Geung-young	South Korea	
The Darkest Hour	Chris Gorak	Emile Hirsch, Olivia Thirlby, Max Minghella	United States	Science fiction action
Dear God No!	James Bickert	Jett Bryant, Madeline Brumby, Paul McComiskey	United States	
Don 2: The King is Back	Farhan Akhtar	Shah Rukh Khan, Priyanka Chopra, Boman Irani	India; Germany	
Drive Angry	Patrick Lussier	Nicolas Cage, Amber Heard, William Fichtner	United States	
Fast Five	Justin Lin	Vin Diesel, Paul Walker, Dwayne Johnson	United States	
Flying Swords of Dragon Gate	Tsui Hark	Jet Li, Zhou Xun, Aloys Chen	Hong Kong; China	
The Green Hornet	Michel Gondry	Seth Rogen, Jay Chou, Cameron Diaz	United States	Action comedy
Green Lantern	Martin Campbell	Ryan Reynolds, Blake Lively, Peter Sarsgaard	United States	Superhero film
Green Lantern: Emerald Knights	Christopher Berkeley	Nathan Fillion, Elisabeth Moss, Jason Isaacs	United States	Animated superhero film
Hanna	Joe Wright	Saoirse Ronan, Eric Bana, Tom Hollander	United States	
He-Man	Sheng Ding	Liu Ye	China	
Hobo with a Shotgun	Jason Eisener	Rutger Hauer, Molly Dunsworth, Gregory Smith	Canada; United States	
I Am Number Four	D. J. Caruso	Alex Pettyfer, Timothy Olyphant, Teresa Palmer	United States	Action thriller
Immortals	Tarsem Singh	Henry Cavill, Stephen Dorff, Luke Evans, Mickey Rourke	United States	Fantasy action
Karate Girl	Kimura Yoshikatsu	Rina Takeda, Hina Tobimatsu, Naka Tatsuya	Japan	Martial arts film
Karate-Robo Zaborgar	Noboru Iguchi	Itsuji Itao, Mami Yamasaki, Asami	Japan	
The Kick	Prachya Pinkaew	Cho Jae-hyun, Ye Ji-won, Petchtai Wongkamlao	South Korea; Thailand	
Killer Elite	Gary McKendry	Jason Statham, Clive Owen, Robert De Niro	Australia; United States	
Largo Winch II	Jérôme Salle	Tomer Gazit Sisley, Sharon Stone, Ulrich Tukur	France	
A Lonely Place to Die	Julian Gilbey	Melissa George, Ed Speleers, Eamonn Walker	United Kingdom	Action thriller
The Lost Bladesman	Alan Mak, Felix Chong	Donnie Yen, Jiang Wen, Betty Sun	Hong Kong; China	
Manborg	Steven Kostanski	Matthew Kennedy, Adam Brooks, Meredith Sweeney	Canada	Science fiction
Manila Kingpin: The Asiong Salonga Story	Tikoy Aguiluz	Jeorge "E.R." Estregan, Carla Abellana, Phillip Salvador	Philippines	Biographical action drama
The Mechanic	Simon West	Jason Statham, Ben Foster, Tony Goldwyn	United States	
Mission: Impossible – Ghost Protocol	Brad Bird	Tom Cruise, Jeremy Renner, Ving Rhames	United States	
''Monster Brawl''	Jesse Thomas Cook	Dave Foley, Art Hindle, Robert Maillett	Canada	
Mr. & Mrs. Incredible	Vincent Kok	Louis Koo, Sandra Ng, Wen Zhang	Hong Kong; China	
My Kingdom	Gao Xiaosong	Wu Chun, Han Geng, Barbie Hsu	Hong Kong; United States; China	
My Own Swordsman	Shang Jing	Yan Ni, Yao Chen, Sha Yi	China	
Never Back Down 2	Michael Jai White	Michael Jai White, Evan Peters, Alex Meraz	United States	Martial arts film
Ninja Kids!!!	Takashi Miike	Seishiro Kato, Takuya Mizoguchi, Futa Kimura	Japan	
No Limit	Fu Huayang	Hans Zhang, Zheng Shuang, Shi Yanneng	China	
Ang Panday 2	Mac Alejandre	Ramon 'Bong' Revilla Jr., Marian Rivera, Phillip Salvador	Philippines	Action fantasy
Quick	Jo Bum-gu	Lee Min-ki, Kang Ye-won, Kim In-kwon	South Korea	
The Raid: Redemption	Gareth Evans	Iko Uwais, Joe Taslim, Donny Alamsyah	Indonesia	
Red Tears	Takanori Tsujimoto	Natsuki Kato, Yuma Ishigaki, Yasuaki Kurata	Japan	
Season of the Witch	Dominic Sena	Nicolas Cage, Ron Perlman, Stephen Campbell Moore	United States	Action thriller
Sector 7	Kim Ji-hoon	Ha Ji-won, Ahn Sung-ki, Oh Ji-ho	South Korea	
Shaolin	Benny Chan	Andy Lau, Nicholas Tse, Jackie Chan	China; Hong Kong	
Sherlock Holmes: A Game of Shadows	Guy Ritchie	Robert Downey Jr., Jude Law, Noomi Rapace	United States	
Singham	Rohit Shetty	Ajay Devgn, Kajal Aggarwal, Prakash Raj	India	
Sleepless Night	Frédéric Jardin	Tomer Sisley, Serge Riaboukine, Julien Boisselier	France; Belgium; Luxembourg	Action thriller
Sniper: Reloaded	Claudio Fäh	Chad Michael Collins, Richard Sammel, Billy Zane	South Africa United States	
Source Code	Duncan Jones	Jake Gyllenhaal, Michelle Monaghan, Vera Farmiga	Canada; United States	Action thriller
Sucker Punch	Zack Snyder	Emily Browning, Abbie Cornish, Vanessa Hudgens	United States	
The Sword Identity	Xu Haofeng	Yu Chenghui, Song Yang, Zhao Yuanyuan	China	
Thor	Kenneth Branagh	Chris Hemsworth, Tom Hiddleston, Natalie Portman	United States	
Transformers: Dark of the Moon	Michael Bay	Shia LaBeouf, Tyrese Gibson, John Malkovich	United States	
The Warring States	Jin Chen	Sun Honglei, Jing Tian, Kim Heui-seon	China	
White Vengeance	Daniel Lee	Leon Lai, Zhang Hanyu, Crystal Liu	Hong Kong; China	
Wild 7	Eiichiro Hasumi	Dairoku Hiba, Kippei Shiina, Ryuhei Maruyama	Japan	
Wu Xia	Peter Chan	Donnie Yen, Kaneshiro Takeshi, Tang Wei	Hong Kong; China	
X-Men: First Class	Matthew Vaughn	Michael Fassbender, Kevin Bacon, James McAvoy	United States	
Yakuza Weapon	Tak Sakaguchi, Yûdai Yamaguchi	Tak Sakaguchi, Shingo Tsurumi, Mei Kurokawa	Japan	

== 2012 ==
Title	Director	Cast	Country	Subgenre/notes
2012
21 Jump Street	Phil Lord, Christopher Miller	Jonah Hill, Channing Tatum, Brie Larson	United States	
Abraham Lincoln: Vampire Hunter	Timur Bekmambetov	Benjamin Walker, Dominic Cooper, Anthony Mackie	United States	
Act of Valor	Scott Waugh, Mike "Mouse" McCoy	Emilio Rivera, Roselyn Sánchez, Alex Veadov	United States	
Agneepath	Karan Malhotra	Hrithik Roshan, Rishi Kapoor, Sanjay Dutt	India	
The Amazing Adventures of the Living Corpse	Justin Paul Ritter	Michael Vittar, Marshall Hilton, Ryan McGivern	United States	Animated action horror film
The Amazing Spider-Man	Marc Webb	Andrew Garfield, Emma Stone, Rhys Ifans	United States	
The Avengers	Joss Whedon	Robert Downey Jr., Chris Evans, Scarlett Johansson	United States	
Bait 3D	Kimble Rendall	Xavier Samuel, Phoebe Tonkin, Sharni Vinson	Australia; Singapore	Action thriller
Batman: The Dark Knight Returns, Part 1	Jay Oliva	Peter Weller, Ariel Winter, David Selby	United States	Animated superhero film
Battleship	Peter Berg	Taylor Kitsch, Liam Neeson, Brooklyn Decker, Rihanna, Alexander Skarsgård	United States	Sci-fi action
Black & White Episode I: The Dawn of Assault	Tsai Yueh-hsun	Mark Chao, Huang Bo, Angelababy	Taiwan	
The Bourne Legacy	Tony Gilroy	Jeremy Renner, Edward Norton, Rachel Weisz	United States	
A Company Man	Im Sang-yoon	So Ji-sub, Lee Mi-yeon, Kwak Do-won	South Korea	
Contraband	Baltasar Kormákur	Mark Wahlberg, Kate Beckinsale, Ben Foster	United States	Action thriller, crime thriller
CZ12	Jackie Chan	Jackie Chan, Kwon Sang-woo	Hong Kong; China	
Dabangg 2	Arbaaz Khan	Salman Khan, Sonakshi Sinha, Prakash Raj	India	
The Dark Knight Rises	Christopher Nolan	Christian Bale, Anne Hathaway, Tom Hardy	United States; United Kingdom	Superhero film
Dredd	Pete Travis	Karl Urban, Olivia Thirlby, Lena Headey	United Kingdom; South Africa	Science fiction action
Ek Tha Tiger	Kabir Khan	Salman Khan, Katrina Kaif	India	Action thriller
The Expendables 2	Simon West	Sylvester Stallone, Jason Statham, Jet Li	United States	
Fire with Fire	David Barrett	Josh Duhamel, Bruce Willis, Rosario Dawson	United States	Action thriller
The Four	Gordon Chan, Janet Chun	Deng Chao, Crystal Liu, Collin Chou	Hong Kong; China	
Gangs of Wasseypur – Part 1	Anurag Kashyap	Manoj Bajpayee, Richa Chadda, Reema Sen, Piyush Mishra, Nawazuddin Siddiqui, Jaideep Ahlawat, Vineet Kumar Singh, Pankaj Tripathi, Jameel Khan, Huma Qureshi	India	Epic crime film
Gangs of Wasseypur – Part 2	Anurag Kashyap	Nawazuddin Siddiqui, Manoj Bajpayee, Richa Chadda, Huma Qureshi, Reema Sen, Anurita Jha, Piyush Mishra, Jameel Khan, Vineet Kumar Singh, Pankaj Tripathi	India	Epic crime film
Ghost Rider: Spirit of Vengeance	Mark Neveldine, Brian Taylor	Nicolas Cage, Ciarán Hinds, Violante Placido	United States	
The Guillotines	Andrew Lau	Huang Xiaoming, Ethan Juan	Hong Kong; China; Taiwan	
Guns and Roses	Ning Hao	Lei Jiayin, Tao Hong, Cheng Yuanyuan	China	
Hit and Run	Dax Shepard	Dax Shepard, Kristen Bell, Bradley Cooper	United States	Action comedy
Hitman	Cesar Montano	Cesar Montano, Sam Pinto, Phillip Salvador	Philippines	
Jack Reacher	Christopher McQuarrie	Tom Cruise, Rosamund Pike, Robert Duvall	United States	Action thriller
John Carter	Andrew Stanton	Taylor Kitsch, Lynn Collins, Willem Dafoe	United States	
Justice League: Doom	Lauren Montgomery	Kevin Conroy, Tim Daly, Nathan Fillion	United States	Animated superhero film
Lockout	Stephen Saint Leger, James Mather	Guy Pearce, Maggie Grace, Vincent Regan, Joe Gilgun, Lennie James, Peter Stormare	France	Science fiction action
The Man with the Iron Fists	RZA	Russell Crowe, Lucy Liu, RZA	United States	
Men in Black 3	Barry Sonnenfeld	Tommy Lee Jones, Will Smith, Josh Brolin	United States	
Naked Soldier	Marco Mak	Jennifer Tse, Sammo Hung, Ankie Beilke	Hong Kong	
Premium Rush	David Koepp	Joseph Gordon-Levitt, Michael Shannon, Dania Ramirez	United States	Action thriller
Resident Evil: Retribution	Paul W. S. Anderson	Milla Jovovich, Michelle Rodriguez, Kevin Durand, Sienna GuilloryLi Bingbing	Germany; United States; Canada	Science fiction action
Rurouni Kenshin	Keishi Otomo	Takeru Sato, Emi Takei, Koji Kikkawa	Japan	
Safe	Boaz Yakin	Jason Statham, Chris Sarandon, James Hong	United States	Action thriller
Safe House	Daniel Espinosa	Denzel Washington, Ryan Reynolds, Vera Farmiga	United States	Action thriller
Skyfall	Sam Mendes	Daniel Craig, Judi Dench, Javier Bardem	United Kingdom; United States	Spy
Soldiers of Fortune	Maksim Korostyshevsky	Christian Slater, Sean Bean, Ving Rhames	United States	
Superman vs. The Elite	Michael Chang	George Newbern, Pauley Perrette, Robin Atkin Downes	United States	Superhero
Tai Chi 0	Stephen Fung	Angelababy, Tony Leung Kar-Fai, Eddie Peng	Hong Kong	
Taken 2	Olivier Megaton	Liam Neeson, Maggie Grace, Famke Janssen	United States; France	Action thriller
Tiktik: The Aswang Chronicles	Erik Matti	Dingdong Dantes, Lovi Poe, Joey Marquez, Janice de Belen, Roi Vinzon, LJ Reyes, Ramon Bautista, Mike Gayoso, Rina Reyes, Roldan Aquino	Philippines	Action horror adventure
Underworld: Awakening	Mans Marlind, Bjorn Stein	Kate Beckinsale, Stephen Rea, Michael Ealy	United States	
Universal Soldier: Day of Reckoning	John Hyams	Jean-Claude Van Damme, Scott Adkins, Andrei Arlovski	United States	Science fiction-horror action
The Viral Factor	Dante Lam	Jay Chou, Lin Peng, Nicholas Tse	Hong Kong	
Wrath of the Titans	Jonathan Liebesman	Sam Worthington, Bill Nighy, Ralph Fiennes, Liam Neeson	United States; Spain	Fantasy action
Wu Dang	Patrick Leung	Vincent Zhao, Mini Yang, Louis Fan	China; Hong Kong	

== 2013 ==
Title	Director	Cast	Country	Subgenre/notes
2013
009-1: The End of the Beginning	Koichi Sakamoto	Mayuko Iwasa, Minehiro Kinomoto, Nao Nagasawa	Japan	
10,000 Hours	Bb. Joyce Bernal	Robin Padilla, Michael de Mesa, Bela Padilla, Pen Medina, Mylene Dizon, Carla Humphries, Alden Richards, Joem Bascon, Bibeth Orteza, Cholo Barretto	Philippines	
2 Guns	Baltasar Kormákur	Mark Wahlberg, Denzel Washington, Paula Patton	United States	
Alfredo S. Lim (The Untold Story)	Cesar Montano	Cesar Montano, Alessandra de Rossi, Nonie Buencamino, Marc Abaya, Alwyn Uytingco, Alvin Anson, Tirso Cruz III, Jackie Lou Blanco, Isabel Granada, Kristel Romero	Philippines	Biographical action film
Angel Warriors	Fu Huayang	Collin Chou, Yu Nan, Shi Yanneng	China	
Avenged	Michael S. Ojeda	Amanda Adrienne, Tom Ardavany, Ronnie Gene Blevins	United States	
Batman: The Dark Knight Returns, Part 2	Jay Oliva	Peter Weller, Ariel Winter, David Selby	United States	Animated superhero film
The Berlin File	Ryoo Seung-wan	Ha Jung-woo, Han Suk-kyu, Ryoo Seung-bum	South Korea	
Bounty Killer	Henry Saine	Christian Pitre, Matthew Marsden, Kristanna Loken	United States	Science fiction action
Boy Golden	Chito S. Roño	Jeorge Estregan, KC Concepcion, Joem Bascon	Philippines	Biographical action film
Bullet to the Head	Walter Hill	Sylvester Stallone, Sung Kang, Sarah Shahi	United States	
Death Race 3: Inferno	Roel Reiné	Luke Goss, Danny Trejo, Tanit Phoenix, Frederick Koehler, Robin Shou, Ving Rhames, Dougray Scott	United States	Science fiction action
Elysium	Neill Blomkamp	Matt Damon, Jodie Foster, William Fichtner, Alice Braga, Sharlto Copley	United States	
Ender's Game	Gavin Hood	Harrison Ford, Asa Butterfield, Ben Kingsley, Hailee Steinfeld, Abigail Breslin, Viola Davis	United States	
Escape Plan	Mikael Håfström	Sylvester Stallone, Arnold Schwarzenegger, James Caviezel	United States	
Fast & Furious 6	Justin Lin	Vin Diesel, Paul Walker, Dwayne Johnson	United States	
The Fighting Chefs	Ronn Rick	Ronnie Ricketts, Boy Logro, Arci Muñoz, Mark Gil, Dinky Doo, PJ Cuartero, Tiara Santos, Billy James Renacia, Hero Angeles, Roldan Aquino	Philippines	Action comedy film
Firestorm	Alan Yuen	Andy Lau, Gordon Lam, Yao Chen	Hong Kong	
The Four II	Gordon Chan, Janet Chun	Deng Chao, Crystal Liu, Collin Chou	Hong Kong; China	
Frankenstein's Army	Richard Raaphorst	Karel Roden, Joshua Sasse, Robert Gwilym	Netherlands	Sci-fi action
Gangster Squad	Ruben Fleischer	Sean Penn, Ryan Gosling, Josh Brolin	United States	Action thriller
Getaway	Courtney Solomon	Ethan Hawke, Selena Gomez, Jon Voight, Bruce Payne	United States	
G.I. Joe: Retaliation	Jon M. Chu	Dwayne Johnson, Channing Tatum, D. J. Cotrona	United States	
A Good Day to Die Hard	John Moore	Bruce Willis, Jai Courtney, Sebastian Koch	United States	
The Heat	Paul Feig	Sandra Bullock, Melissa McCarthy, Demián Bichir	United States	Action comedy
Homefront	Gary Fleder	Jason Statham, James Franco, Kate Bosworth	United States	Action thriller
Ang Huling Henya	Marlon Rivera	Rufa Mae Quinto, Edgar Allan Guzman, Candy Pangilinan	Philippines	Zombie comedy
Hummingbird	Steven Knight	Jason Statham, Benedict Wong, Vicky McClure	United States; United Kingdom	Action thriller
Iron Man 3	Shane Black	Robert Downey Jr., Gwyneth Paltrow, Don Cheadle	United States	Superhero
Justice League: The Flashpoint Paradox	Jay Oliva	Justin Chambers, C. Thomas Howell, Michael B. Jordan	United States	Animated superhero film
Kick-Ass 2	Jeff Wadlow	Aaron Taylor-Johnson, Chloë Grace Moretz, Christopher Mintz-Plasse	United States	
Kimmy Dora: Ang Kiyemeng Prequel	Joyce Bernal, Chris Martinez	Eugene Domingo, Sam Milby, Ariel Ureta	Philippines	Action comedy
The Last Stand	Kim Jee-woon	Arnold Schwarzenegger, Peter Stormare, Forest Whitaker	United States	
The Lone Ranger	Gore Verbinski	Johnny Depp, Armie Hammer, Helena Bonham Carter, Tom Wilkinson, William Fichtner, James Badge Dale, Ruth Wilson, Barry Pepper	United States	Western action adventure
Machete Kills	Robert Rodriguez	Danny Trejo, Michelle Rodriguez, Sofía Vergara	United States	
Man of Steel	Zack Snyder	Henry Cavill, Amy Adams, Michael Shannon	United Kingdom; United States	Superhero
Man of Tai Chi	Keanu Reeves	Tiger Chen, Keanu Reeves, Karen Mok, Simon Yam, Sam Lee, Michael Tong, Iko Uwais	China; United States	Martial arts film
The Marine 3: Homefront	Scott Wiper	The Miz, Neal McDonough, Michael Eklund, Ashley Bell, Camille Sullivan, Jared Keeso	United States	
Ninja: Shadow of a Tear	Isaac Florentine	Scott Adkins, Kane Kosugi, Mika Hijii, Shun Sugata	United States	Martial arts film
Oblivion	Joseph Kosinski	Tom Cruise, Melissa Leo, Andrea Riseborough, Olga Kurylenko, Morgan Freeman	United States	Science fiction action
Olympus Has Fallen	Antoine Fuqua	Gerard Butler, Aaron Eckhart, Morgan Freeman	United States	
On the Job	Erik Matti	Gerald Anderson, Joel Torre, Piolo Pascual, Joey Marquez, Angel Aquino, Shaina Magdayao, Empress Schuck, Leo Martinez, Michael de Mesa, Vivian Velez	Philippines	Crime thriller
Once Upon a Time in Vietnam	Dustin Nguyễn	Dustin Nguyễn, Veronica Ngô, Roger Yuan	Vietnam	
Pacific Rim	Guillermo del Toro	Charlie Hunnam, Idris Elba, Rinko Kikuchi	United States	
The Package	Jesse V. Johnson	Steve Austin, Dolph Lundgren, Jerry Trimble	United States	
Pain & Gain	Michael Bay	Dwayne Johnson, Mark Wahlberg, Anthony Mackie, Tony Shalhoub, Ed Harris, Rebel Wilson, Ken Jeong	United States	
Pro Wrestlers vs Zombies	Cody Knotts	Roddy Piper, Matt Hardy, Kurt Angle	United States	
Red 2	Dean Parisot	Bruce Willis, John Malkovich, Mary-Louise Parker	United States	
R.I.P.D.	Robert Schwentke	Ryan Reynolds, Jeff Bridges, Kevin Bacon	United States	Action comedy
Running Man	Jo Dong-oh	Shin Ha-kyun, Lee Min-ho, Kim Sang-ho	South Korea	
Saka-saka	Toto Natividad	Ejay Falcon, Joseph Marco, Akiko Solon, Baron Geisler, Kathleen Hermosa, Perla Bautista, Toby Alejar, Martin Imperial, Mon Confiado, Rey Solo	Philippines	
The Shifting	Julio Saldarriaga	Carlos Acuña, Matthew Alan, Felix Avitia	United States; Colombia	Action crime drama film
Snowpiercer	Bong Joon-ho	Chris Evans, Tilda Swinton, Jamie Bell	South Korea; Czech Republic	Science fiction action
Special ID	Clarence Fok	Donnie Yen, Jing Tian, Andy On, Zhang Hanyu, Ronald Cheng, Collin Chou	China	Martial arts film
Star Trek Into Darkness	J. J. Abrams	Chris Pine, Zachary Quinto, Zoe Saldaña	United States	Science fiction action film
Superman Unbound	James Tuker	Matt Bomer, Stana Katic, John Noble	United States	Animated superhero film
The Suspect	Won Shin-yun	Gong Yoo, Park Hee-soon, Jo Sung-ha	South Korea	
Switch	Jay Sun	Andy Lau, Tong Dawei, Zhang Jingchu	China; Hong Kong	
Thor: The Dark World	Alan Taylor	Chris Hemsworth, Tom Hiddleston, Natalie Portman	United States	
Tom Yum Goong 2	Prachya Pinkaew	Tony Jaa, RZA, Petchtai "Mum Jokmok" Wongkamlao	Thailand	
Waar	Bilal Lashari	Shaan Shahid, Shamoon Abbasi, Ali Azmat	Pakistan	Action thriller
Welcome to the Punch	Eran Creevy	James McAvoy, Andrea Riseborough, Mark Strong, David Morrissey	United Kingdom	
White House Down	Roland Emmerich	Channing Tatum, Jamie Foxx, Maggie Gyllenhaal	United States	
The White Storm	Benny Chan	Sean Lau, Louis Koo, Nick Cheung	Hong Kong; China	Action thriller
The Wolverine	James Mangold	Hugh Jackman, Will Yun Lee, Rila Fukushima	United States; United Kingdom	
World War Z	Marc Forster	Brad Pitt, Mireille Enos, Matthew Fox	United States; United Kingdom	
The Wrath of Vajra	Law Wing-Cheung	Xing Yu, Yoo Seung-jun, Nam Hyun-joon	China	Martial arts film

== 2014 ==
Title	Director	Cast	Country	Subgenre/notes
22 Jump Street	Phil Lord, Christopher Miller	Jonah Hill, Channing Tatum, Ice Cube	United States	
300: Rise of an Empire	Noam Murro	Sullivan Stapleton, Eva Green, Lena Headey, Hans Matheson, David Wenham, Rodrigo Santoro	United States	Period action film
Alibughang Anak	Rodolfo Fajardo	Ram Mercado, Abbygale Monderin, Marko Boy Alima, Tal Garcia, Lucita Soriano, Roldan Aquino, Richie D'Horsie, Alex Tinsay, Popoy Bardos, Benny Abante	Philippines	Christian action film
The Amazing Spider-Man 2	Marc Webb	Andrew Garfield, Emma Stone, Jamie Foxx	United States	Superhero film
American Sniper	Clint Eastwood	Bradley Cooper, Luke Grimes, Sienna Miller	United States	
Android Cop	Mark Atkins	Michael Jai White, Charles S. Dutton, Randy Wayne	United States	Science fiction action
Arachnicide	Paolo Bertola	Gino Barzacchi, Gabriel Cash, Riccardo Serventi Longhi	Italy	Television film
Army of Frankensteins	Ryan Bellgardt	Jordan Farris, Christian Bellgardt, Rest Terrell	United States	Science fiction action
Black & White: The Dawn of Justice	Tsai Yueh-Hsun	Mark Chao, Lin Gengxin, Huang Bo	China; Taiwan	
Black Butler	Kentarō Ōtani, Keiichi Satō	Hiro Mizushima, Ayame Goriki, Yūka	Japan	Science fiction action
Bonifacio: Ang Unang Pangulo	Enzo Williams	Robin Padilla, Vina Morales, Eddie Garcia, Daniel Padilla, Jasmine Curtis-Smith, RJ Padilla, Jericho Rosales, Isabel Oli, Joem Bascon, Rommel Padilla	Philippines	Historical action drama
The Breaking Point	James C. Hunter	Erik Grey, Diana Lovell, Reggie Peters, Roy Williams Jr. and Sean Nelson	United States	Action crime drama
Brick Mansions	Camille Delamarre	Paul Walker, David Belle, RZA	Canada; France	
Brotherhood of Blades	Lu Yang	Chang Chen, Cecilia Lu, Wang Qianyuan	China	Martial arts film
Captain America: The Winter Soldier	Josphe and Anthony Russo	Chris Evans, Sebastian Stan, Anthony Mackie	United States	
The Dead Lands	Toa Fraser	James Rolleston, Lawrence Makoare, Te Kohe Tuhaka	New Zealand	
Dracula Untold	Gary Shore	Luke Evans, Dominic Cooper, Sarah Gadon, Charles Dance	United States	Fantasy action horror
Edge of Tomorrow	Doug Liman	Tom Cruise, Emily Blunt, Bill Paxton	United States	Science fiction action
The Equalizer	Antoine Fuqua	Denzel Washington, Marton Csokas, Chloë Grace Moretz, David Harbour, Bill Pullman, Melissa Leo	United States	Action thriller
Everly	Joe Lynch	Salma Hayek, Akie Kotabe, Laura Cepeda	United States	
The Expendables 3	Patrick Hughes	Sylvester Stallone, Mel Gibson, Jason Statham	United States	
Falcon Rising	Ernie Barbarash	Michael Jai White, Neal McDonough, Laila Ali	United States	
Gangster Lolo	William G. Mayo	Leo Martinez, Bembol Roco, Soxie Topacio, Pen Medina, Rez Cortez	Philippines	Action comedy
Godzilla	Gareth Edwards	Aaron Taylor-Johnson, Ken Watanabe, Elizabeth Olsen, Bryan Cranston	United States	Monster film
Guardians of the Galaxy	James Gunn	Chris Pratt, Zoe Saldaña, Lee Pace	United States	
Gun Woman	Kurando Mitsutake		Japan	
Heavenly Sword	Gun Ho Jung	Anna Torv, Alfred Molina, Thomas Jane	United States	Animated film
Hercules	Brett Ratner	Dwayne Johnson, Ian McShane, Rufus Sewell	United States	Sword and sandal
High Kick Angels	Yokoyama Kazuhiro	Miyahara Kanon, Ito Risako, Kawamoto Mayu	Japan	
I, Frankenstein	Stuart Beattie	Aaron Eckhart, Bill Nighy, Yvonne Strahowski	United States	Action horror
In the Blood	John Stockwell	Gina Carano, Amaury Nolasco, Stephen Lang, Danny Trejo	United States	
Jack Ryan: Shadow Recruit	Kenneth Branagh	Chris Pine, Keira Knightley, Kevin Costner	United States	Action thriller
John Wick	David Leitch, Chad Stahelski	Keanu Reeves, Michael Nyqvist, Alfie Allen	United States	
Justice League: War	Jay Oliva	Alan Tudyk, Shemar Moore, Steve Blum	United States	Animated superhero film
Kingsman: The Secret Service	Matthew Vaughn	Colin Firth, Samuel L. Jackson, Mark Strong	United States	
Kung Fu Jungle	Teddy Chen	Donnie Yen, Wang Baoqiang, Charlie Young	Hong Kong; China	
The Legend of Hercules	Renny Harlin	Kellan Lutz, Liam McIntyre, Scott Adkins	United States	
Lucy	Luc Besson	Scarlett Johansson, Morgan Freeman, Choi Min-Sik	France	
The Maze Runner	Wes Ball	Dylan O'Brien, Thomas Brodie-Sangster, Will Poulter	United States	
Mercenaries	Christopher Douglas-Olen Ray	Zoë Bell, Brigitte Nielsen, Kristanna Loken	United States	
Muslim Magnum .357: To Serve and Protect	Francis 'Jun' Posadas	Jeorge Estregan, Sam Pinto, Roi Vinzon, John Arcilla, John Regala, Efren Reyes, Jon Hall, Clarence Delgado, Jerico Estregan, Maria Ejercito	Philippines	
No Tears for the Dead	Lee Jeong-beom	Jang Dong-gun, Kim Min-hee	South Korea	
P-51 Dragon Fighter	Mark Atkins	Scott Martin, Stephanie Beran, Ross Brooks	United States	
The Raid 2: Berandal	Gareth Evans	Iko Uwais, Yayan Ruhian, Julie Estelle, Cecep Arif Rahman, Very Tri Yulisman	Indonesia	
Redeemer	Ernesto Díaz Espinoza	Marko Zaror, Noah Segan, Jose Luis Mosca	Chile	
Ride Along	Tim Story	Ice Cube, Kevin Hart, John Leguizamo	United States	Action comedy
RoboCop	José Padilha	Joel Kinnaman, Gary Oldman, Samuel L. Jackson	United States	Science fiction action
Sa Ngalan ng Ama, Ina at mga Anak	Jon Villarin	Robin Padilla, Daniel Padilla, Mariel Rodriguez-Padilla, Kylie Padilla, RJ Padilla, Bela Padilla, Matt Padilla, Rommel Padilla, Gideon Padilla, Queenie Padilla	Philippines	Historical action film
Sabotage	David Ayer	Arnold Schwarzenegger, Sam Worthington, Olivia Williams, Terrence Howard, Joe Manganiello, Harold Perrineau, Martin Donovan, Max Martini, Josh Holloway, Mireille Enos	United States	Action thriller
Scratch	Maninder Chana	Julie Romaniuk, Craig Cyr, Romaine Waite, Jojo Karume, J.J. Reville, Len Silvini and Justin Bott	Canada	Action crime comedy-drama
SEAL Team 8: Behind Enemy Lines	Roel Reiné	Tom Sizemore, Lex Shrapnel, Langley Kirkwood	United States	
Sin City: A Dame to Kill For	Robert Rodriguez, Frank Miller	Mickey Rourke, Jessica Alba, Josh Brolin, Joseph Gordon-Levitt	United States	Action thriller
Skin Trade	Ekachai Uekrongtham	Dolph Lundgren, Tony Jaa, Michael Jai White, Ron Perlman, Peter Weller	United States; Thailand	Action thriller
Sniper: Legacy	Don Michael Paul	Tom Berenger, Chad Michael Collins, Dominic Mafham	United States	
Son of Batman	Ethan Spaulding	Jason O'Mara, Thomas Gibson, Stuart Allan	United States	Superhero
The Target	Chang	Ryu Seung-ryong, Lee Jin-wook, Yoo Jun-sang	South Korea	
Teenage Mutant Ninja Turtles	Jonathan Liebesman	Megan Fox, Alan Ritchson, Pete Ploszek	United States	Superhero
Tokyo Tribe	Sion Sono		Japan	
Tomb Robber	Dao Tai Yu		China	
Transformers: Age of Extinction	Michael Bay	Mark Wahlberg, Jack Reynor, Nicola Peltz	United States	
X-Men: Days of Future Past	Bryan Singer	James McAvoy, Michael Fassbender, Jennifer Lawrence	United States	
WolfCop	Lowell Dean	Leo Fafard, Amy Matysio, Jonathan Cherry	Canada	Action comedy
Wyrmwood: Road of the Dead	Kiah Roache-Turner	Bianca Bradey, Luke McKenzie, Catherine Terracini	Australia	

== 2015 ==
Title	Director	Cast	Country	Subgenre/notes
2015
American Ultra	Nima Nourizadeh	Jesse Eisenberg, Kristen Stewart, Topher Grace	United States	
Angela Markado	Carlo J. Caparas	Andi Eigenmann, Paolo Contis, Felix Roco, Polo Ravales, CJ Caparas, Epy Quizon, Bembol Roco, Marita Zobel, Ana Roces	Philippines	Revenge action thriller
Ant-Man	Peyton Reed	Paul Rudd, Michael Douglas, Evangeline Lilly	United States	Superhero film
Avengers: Age of Ultron	Joss Whedon	Robert Downey Jr., Chris Evans, Mark Ruffalo	United States	Superhero film
Blackhat	Michael Mann	Chris Hemsworth, Viola Davis, John Ortiz	United States	
Barely Lethal	Kyle Newman	Jaime King, Samuel L. Jackson, Madeleine Stack, Hailee Steinfeld, Sophie Turner, Jessica Alba	United States	
Chappie	Neill Blomkamp	Sharlto Copley, Dev Patel, Yolandi Visser	United States	
Close Range	Isaac Florentine	Scott Adkins, Nick Chinlund, Jake La Botz, Tony Perez, Scott Evans	United States	
Dragon Blade	Daniel Lee	Jackie Chan, John Cusack, Adrien Brody	Hong Kong; China	
Fantastic Four	Josh Trank	Miles Teller, Kate Mara, Michael B. Jordan, Jamie Bell	United States	
Furious 7	James Wan	Vin Diesel, Paul Walker, Dwayne Johnson	United States	
Gridlocked	Allan Ungar	Dominic Purcell, Danny Glover, Stephen Lang, Trish Stratus	United States	
The Gunman	Pierre Morel	Sean Penn, Javier Bardem, Idris Elba	United States	
Hardcore Henry	Ilya Naishuller	Sharlto Copley, Danila Kozlovsky, Haley Bennett, Svetlana Ustinova, Tim Roth	Russia; United States	
Heist	Scott Mann	Jeffrey Dean Morgan, Robert De Niro, Dave Bautista	United States	
Hitman: Agent 47	Aleksander Bach	Rupert Friend, Zachary Quinto, Hannah Ware	Germany; United States	
Ip Man 3	Wilson Yip	Donnie Yen, Zhang Jin, Lynn Hung, Patrick Tam, Karena Ng, Kent Cheng, Bryan Leung, Louis Cheung, Danny Chan, Mike Tyson, Tats Lau	Hong Kong	Martial arts film
Kingsman: The Secret Service	Matthew Vaughn	Colin Firth, Taron Egerton, Samuel L. Jackson,	United States; United Kingdom	Action thriller
Kung Fury	David Sandberg	David Sandberg, Jorma Taccone, Leopold Nilsson	Sweden	Short film
The Last Witch Hunter	Breck Eisner	Vin Diesel, Elijah Wood, Rose Leslie	United States	Supernatural action
Mad Max: Fury Road	George Miller	Tom Hardy, Charlize Theron, Nicholas Hoult	Australia; United States	
The Man from U.N.C.L.E.	Guy Ritchie	Henry Cavill, Armie Hammer, Elizabeth Debicki	United States	
The Marine 4: Moving Target	William Kaufman	The Miz, Melissa Roxburgh, Summer Rae, Paul McGillion, Roark Critchlow, Craig Veroni	United States	
Maze Runner: The Scorch Trials	Wes Ball	Dylan O'Brien, Thomas Brodie-Sangster, Rosa Salazar	United States	
Manila's Finest	William G. Mayo	Jeric Raval, Mark Anthony Fernandez, Bangs Garcia, Danilo "Brownie" Pansalin, Jay Prince Armodoval, Joko Diaz, Leo Martinez, Jao Mapa, Rich Asuncion, Rommel Padilla	Philippines	
Mission: Impossible – Rogue Nation	Christopher McQuarrie	Tom Cruise, Jeremy Renner, Simon Pegg	United States	
Mortdecai	David Koepp	Johnny Depp, Gwyneth Paltrow, Ewan McGregor	United States	Action comedy
Nilalang	Pedring Lopez	Cesar Montano, Maria Ozawa, Meg Imperial	Philippines	Action horror
No Escape	John Erick Dowdle	Owen Wilson, Lake Bell, Pierce Brosnan	United States	Action thriller
Point Break	Ericson Core	Édgar Ramírez, Luke Bracey, Teresa Palmer	United States	
Run All Night	Jaume Collet-Serra	Liam Neeson, Joel Kinnaman, Ed Harris	United States	
San Andreas Quake	John Baumgartner	Jhey Castles, Jason Woods, Grace Van Dien	United States	
San Andreas	Brad Peyton	Dwayne Johnson, Carla Gugino, Alexandra Daddario	United States	
Spectre	Sam Mendes	Daniel Craig, Ralph Fiennes, Christoph Waltz	United Kingdom; United States	
SPL II: A Time for Consequences	Cheang Pou-soi	Tony Jaa, Wu Jing, Simon Yam, Zhang Jin, Louis Koo	Hong Kong; China	Martial arts film
Spy	Paul Feig	Melissa McCarthy, Jason Statham, Rose Byrne	United States	Action comedy
Star Wars: The Force Awakens	J. J. Abrams	Harrison Ford, Carrie Fisher, John Boyega, Daisy Ridley, Adam Driver	United States	Space opera
Survivor	James McTeigue	Paddy Wallace, Dylan McDermott, Pierce Brosnan, Milla Jovovich	United States	
Taken 3	Olivier Megaton	Liam Neeson, Famke Janssen, Maggie Grace	France	
Terminator Genisys	Alan Taylor	Arnold Schwarzenegger, Jason Clarke, Emilia Clarke	United States	
The Transporter Refueled	Camille Delamarre	Ed Skrein, Ray Stevenson, Loan Chabanol	France; China; United States	
Turbo Kid	François Simard, Anouk Whissell, Yoann-Karl Whissell	Canada	Sci-fi action	
Wild Card	Simon West	Jason Statham, Sofía Vergara, Milo Ventimiglia	United States	
Wolf Warrior	Wu Jing	Wu Jing, Scott Adkins, Yu Nan	China	War action
Z Island	Hiroshi Shinagawa	Show Aikawa, Sawa Suzuki, Yūichi Kimura	Japan	Action comedy horror

== 2016 ==
2016
13 Hours: The Secret Soldiers of Benghazi	Michael Bay	James Badge Dale, John Krasinski, David Giuntoli, Max Martini, Pablo Schreiber, Toby Stephens, David Denman, Dominic Fumusa	United States	War action
The Accountant	Gavin O'Connor	Ben Affleck, Anna Kendrick, J. K. Simmons	United States	
Assassin's Creed	Justin Kurzel	Michael Fassbender, Marion Cotillard	United States	
Bastille Day	James Watkins	Idris Elba, Richard Madden, Charlotte Le Bon, Eriq Ebouaney, José Garcia	Luxembourg; France; United States	
Batman v Superman: Dawn of Justice	Zack Snyder	Ben Affleck, Henry Cavill	United States	Superhero film
Boyka: Undisputed	Todor Chapkanov	Scott Adkins, Emilien De Falco, Alon Abutbul	United States	Martial arts film
Captain America: Civil War	Antony Russo, Joe Russo	Chris Evans, Robert Downey Jr.	United States	Superhero film
Carbon Copy	Michael Dragnea	Hugh Lambe, Frank Skrzeszewski, Julie Romaniuk and Fabio Cedrone	Canada	Action drama
Central Intelligence	Rawson Marshall Thurber	Dwayne Johnson, Kevin Hart	United States	
Deadpool	Tim Miller	Ryan Reynolds, Ed Skrein, Morena Baccarin	United States	Superhero film
Doctor Strange	Scott Derrickson	Benedict Cumberbatch, Chiwetel Ejiofor, Tilda Swinton	United States	Superhero film
Eliminators	James Nunn	Scott Adkins, Wade Barrett, Daniel Caltagirone, James Cosmo, Mem Ferda	United States	
Enteng Kabisote 10 and the Abangers	Marlon N. Rivera; Tony Y. Reyes	Vic Sotto, Epi Quizon, Oyo Boy Sotto, Jose Manalo, Wally Bayola, Paolo Ballesteros, Ryzza Mae Dizon, Bea Binene, Alonzo Muhlach, Ken Chan	Philippines	Superhero comedy
Expressway	Ato Bautista	Alvin Anson, Aljur Abrenica, RK Bagatsing, Erick Samonte, Japo Parcero, Jim Libiran, Allan Equalan, Rose Atienza, Kim Atienza, Danica Siner	Philippines	
Hard Target 2	Roel Reiné	Scott Adkins, Robert Knepper, Rhona Mitra, Temuera Morrison, Adam Saunders, Peter Hardy, Sean Keenan, Troy Honeysett, Katrina Grey	United States	
Headshot	Kimo Stamboel, Timo Tjahjanto	Iko Uwais, Chelsea Islan, Julie Estelle, Zack Lee, Bront Palarae, Ario Bayu	Indonesia	Martial arts film
Independence Day: Resurgence	Roland Emmerich	Jeff Goldblum, Bill Pullman, Jessie Usher, Liam Hemsworth	United States	
Jack Reacher: Never Go Back	Edward Zwick	Tom Cruise, Cobie Smulders	United States	
Jarhead 3: The Siege	William Kaufman	Scott Adkins, Charlie Weber, Dante Basco, Romeo Miller, Sasha Jackson, Dennis Haysbert	United States	
Jason Bourne	Paul Greengrass	Matt Damon, Alicia Vikander, Vincent Cassel	United States	
Keeping Up with the Joneses	Greg Mottola	Jon Hamm, Zach Galifianakis, Gal Gadot, Isla Fisher	United States	Action comedy
Lady Bloodfight	Chris Nahon	Amy Johnston, Muriel Hofmann, Jenny Wu	Hong Kong	Martial arts film
The Legend of Tarzan	David Yates	Alexander Skarsgård, Margot Robbie, Christoph Waltz	United States	
London Has Fallen	Babak Najafi	Gerard Butler, Aaron Eckhart, Morgan Freeman	United States; United Kingdom	
Max Steel	Stewart Hendler	Ben Winchell, Ana Villafañe, Andy García	United States	
Mechanic: Resurrection	Dennis Gansel	Jason Statham, Jessica Alba, Tommy Lee Jones	United States; United Kingdom	
Momentum	Anton Ernst	Morgan Freeman, Olga Kurylenko, James Purefoy	United States, South Africa	Action
Never Back Down: No Surrender	Michael Jai White	Michael Jai White, Josh Barnett, Nathan Jones	United States	Martial arts film
Operation Mekong	Dante Lam	Zhang Hanyu, Eddie Peng, Chen Baoguo, Carl Ng, Vithaya Pansringarm, Ken Lo, Ganesh Acharya, Mandy Wei	China; Thailand	
Resident Evil: The Final Chapter	Paul W. S. Anderson	Milla Jovovich, Ali Larter, Shawn Roberts, Ruby Rose, Eoin Macken, William Levy, Iain Glen	Germany; Canada; United Kingdom; United States; France; Australia	Science fiction action
Ride Along 2	Tim Story	Ice Cube, Kevin Hart, Benjamin Bratt	United States	Action comedy
Sniper: Ghost Shooter	Don Michael Paul	Chad Michael Collins, Billy Zane, Dennis Haysbert	United States	
Spring Break Zombie Massacre	Bobby Carnevale	Sam Suchmann, Mattie Zufelt, Pauly D	United States	Action comedy
Star Trek Beyond	Justin Lin	Chris Pine, Idris Elba, Zachary Quinto, Zoe Saldaña	United States	Action adventure
Suicide Squad	David Ayer	Will Smith, Jared Leto, Margot Robbie	United States	Superhero
Teenage Mutant Ninja Turtles: Out of the Shadows	Dave Green	Megan Fox, Stephen Amell, Will Arnett, Tyler Perry, Laura Linney	United States	Superhero
Terra Formars	Takashi Miike	Hideaki Itō, Emi Takei, Tomohisa Yamashita	Japan	Science fiction action
Train to Busan	Yeon Sang-ho	Gong Yoo, Ma Dong-seok, Jung Yu-mi	South Korea	
Underworld: Blood Wars	Anna Foerster	Kate Beckinsale, Theo James, Lara Pulver, Bradley James	United States	
X-Men: Apocalypse	Bryan Singer	James McAvoy, Michael Fassbender, Jennifer Lawrence, Oscar Isaac	United States	Superhero

== 2017 ==
Title	Director	Cast	Country	Subgenre/notes
24 Hours to Live	Brain Smrz	Ethan Hawke, Xu Qing, Paul Anderson	South Africa; United States	Science fiction thriller
The Adventurers	Stephen Fung	Andy Lau, Shu Qi, Jean Reno	Hong Kong; China; Czech Republic	
American Assassin	Michael Cuesta	Dylan O'Brien, Michael Keaton, Sanaa Lathan, Shiva Negar, Taylor Kitsch	United States	Action thriller
Atomic Blonde	David Leitch	Charlize Theron, James McAvoy, John Goodman	United States	
AWOL	Enzo Williams	Gerald Anderson, Dianne Medina, Raymond Bagatsing, Bembol Roco, Richard Quan, Jeric Raval, Bernard Palanca, Lawrence Pineda	Philippines	Action thriller
Baby Driver	Edgar Wright	Ansel Elgort, Kevin Spacey, Lily James, Eiza González, Jon Hamm, Jamie Foxx	United Kingdom; United States	
Baywatch	Seth Gordon	Dwayne Johnson, Zac Efron, Priyanka Chopra	United States	
Blade of the Immortal	Takashi Miike	Takuya Kimura, Hana Sugisaki, Sota Fukushi	Japan	
The Blood	Jess Vargas	Isabel Granada, Diana Salvador, Nissy May Avila, Tracy Vem Avila, Jess Vargas, Dan Alvaro	Philippines	
The Brink	Jonathan Li	Zhang Jin, Shawn Yue, Janice Man, Yasuaki Kurata	Hong Kong	Martial arts film
CHiPs	Dax Shepard	Dax Shepard, Michael Pena, Rosa Salazar	United States	
Corpus Delicti	Toto Natividad	Xian Lim, Marco Gumabao, Vin Abrenica	Philippines	
Double Barrel	Toto Natividad	AJ Muhlach, Phoebe Walker, Jeric Raval	Philippines	
Extra Service	Chris Martinez	Arci Muñoz, Coleen Garcia, Jessy Mendiola	Philippines	Action comedy
The Fate of the Furious	F. Gary Gray	Vin Diesel, Dwayne Johnson, Jason Statham	United States	
The Foreigner	Martin Campbell	Jackie Chan, Pierce Brosnan	China; United Kingdom	
Ghost in the Shell	Rupert Sanders	Scarlett Johansson, Takeshi Kitano, Pilou Asbæk	United States	Science fiction action
Guardians of the Galaxy Vol. 2	James Gunn	Chris Pratt, Zoe Saldaña, Kurt Russell	United States	
The Hitman's Bodyguard	Patrick Hughes	Ryan Reynolds, Samuel L. Jackson, Gary Oldman	United States	Action comedy
Immigration Game	Krystof Zlatnik	Mathis Landwehr and Denise Owono	Germany	Action thriller drama
Jailbreak	Jimmy Henderson	Jean-Paul Ly, Dara Our, Céline Tran	Cambodia	Martial arts film
John Wick: Chapter 2	Chad Stahelski	Keanu Reeves, Common, Laurence Fishburne	United States	
Justice League	Zack Snyder	Ben Affleck, Henry Cavill, Gal Gadot	United States	
Kingsman: The Golden Circle	Matthew Vaughn	Taron Egerton, Sophie Cookson	United Kingdom; United States	
Kong: Skull Island	Jordan Vogt-Roberts	Tom Hiddleston, Samuel L. Jackson, John Goodman	United States	
The Lego Batman Movie	Chris McKay	Will Arnett	United States	
Logan	James Mangold	Hugh Jackman, Patrick Stewart, Boyd Holbrook	United States	
The Marine 5: Battleground	James Nunn	The Miz, Maryse Ouellet, Curtis Axel, Heath Slater, Bo Dallas, Naomi	United States	
The Mummy	Alex Kurtzman	Tom Cruise, Russell Crowe, Annabelle Wallis	United States	
Overdrive	Antonio Negret	Scott Eastwood, Freddie Thorp, Simon Abkarian	France	
Paradox	Wilson Yip	Louis Koo, Gordon Lam, Wu Yue, Tony Jaa	Hong Kong; China	Marial arts film
Power Rangers	Dean Israelite	Dacre Montgomery, Naomi Scott, RJ Cyler	United States	
Renegades	Steven Quale	Sullivan Stapleton, J. K. Simmons, Charlie Bewley	France; Germany	Action thriller
Riding in Tandem	Toto Natividad	Jason Abalos, Khalil Ramos, Victor Neri	Philippines	
Savage Dog	Jesse V. Johnson	Scott Adkins, Marko Zaror, JuJu Chan	United States	
Security	Alain DesRochers	Antonio Banderas, Ben Kingsley, Gabriella Wright	United States	
Shock Wave	Herman Yau	Andy Lau, Jiang Wu, Song Jia, Philip Keung, Ron Ng	Hong Kong; China	Action thriller
Sleepless	Baran bo Odar	Jamie Foxx, Michelle Monaghan, Dermot Mulroney	United States	
Sniper: Ultimate Kill	Claudio Fäh	Chad Michael Collins, Billy Zane, Tom Berenger	United States	
Spider-Man: Homecoming	Jon Watts	Tom Holland, Michael Keaton, Robert Downey Jr.	United States	Superhero film
Star Wars: The Last Jedi	Rian Johnson	Mark Hamill, Carrie Fisher, John Boyega, Daisy Ridley, Adam Driver	United States	Space opera
Stratton	Simon West	Dominic Cooper, Gemma Chan, Thomas Kretschmann, Connie Nielsen	United Kingdom	Action thriller
Thor: Ragnarok	Taika Waititi	Chris Hemsworth, Mark Ruffalo, Cate Blanchett	United States	Superhero film
Transformers: The Last Knight	Michael Bay	Mark Wahlberg, Anthony Hopkins, Josh Duhamel	United States	
The Villainess	Jung Byung-gil	Kim Ok-vin, Shin Ha-kyun, Sung Joon, Kim Seo-hyung, Jo Eun-ji	South Korea	
Werewolves of the Third Reich	Andrew Jones	Annabelle Lanyon, Lee Bane, Derek Nelson	United Kingdom	Science fiction
Wolf Warrior 2	Wu Jing	Wu Jing, Celina Jade, Frank Grillo, Hans Zhang, Wu Gang, Yu Nan	China	Martial arts film
Wonder Woman	Patty Jenkins	Gal Gadot, Chris Pine, Connie Nielsen	United States	
xXx: Return of Xander Cage	D. J. Caruso	Vin Diesel, Samuel L. Jackson, Donnie Yen	United States	

== 2018 ==
Title	Director	Cast	Country	Subgenre/notes
303 Squadron	Denis Delić	Maciej Zakościelny, Piotr Adamczyk, Cara Theobold, Antoni Królikowski, Andrew Woodall	Poland	Biographical war film
Accident Man	Jesse V. Johnson	Scott Adkins, Ashley Greene, Ray Stevenson, Michael Jai White, Ray Park, Amy Johnston	United Kingdom	
Ant-Man and the Wasp	Peyton Reed	Paul Rudd, Evangeline Lilly, Michael Douglas	United States	Superhero film
Aquaman	James Wan	Jason Momoa, Amber Heard, Patrick Wilson, Yahya Abdul-Mateen II	United States	Superhero film
Avengers: Infinity War	Antony Russo, Joe Russo	Robert Downey Jr., Scarlett Johansson, Chris Pratt, Chris Evans, Chris Hemmsworth, Josh Brolin, Benedict Cumberbatch, Tom Holland	United States	Superhero film
Badge of Honor: To Serve and Protect	Neal Tan	Rommel Padilla, Jeric Raval, Empress Schuck, Rayver Cruz, Alfred Vargas, Rosanna Roces	Philippines	
Black Panther	Ryan Coogler	Chadwick Boseman, Lupita Nyong'o, Michael B. Jordan	United States	Superhero film
Braven	Lin Oeding	Jason Momoa, Garret Dillahunt, Stephen Lang	Canada; United States	
Bumblebee	Travis Knight	Hailee Steinfeld, John Cena, John Ortiz	United States	Science fiction action film
BuyBust	Erik Matti	Anne Curtis, Brandon Vera, Victor Neri, Arjo Atayde, Nonie Buencamino, Joross Gamboa	Philippines	
Deadpool 2	David Leitch	Ryan Reynolds, Josh Brolin, Morena Baccarin	United States	Superhero film
Death Race: Beyond Anarchy	Don Michael Paul	Zach McGowan, Danny Glover, Christine Marzano, Frederick Koehler, Danny Trejo	United States	
Death Wish	Eli Roth	Bruce Willis, Vincent D'Onofrio, Elisabeth Shue	United States	
Den of Thieves	Christian Gudegast	Gerard Butler, Pablo Schreiber, Curtis "50 Cent" Jackson, O'Shea Jackson Jr.	United States	
Escape Plan 2: Hades	Steven C. Miller	Sylvester Stallone, Dave Bautista, Huang Xiaoming, Jaime King, 50 Cent	China; United States; United Kingdom	
The Equalizer 2	Antoine Fuqua	Denzel Washington, Pedro Pascal, Ashton Sanders, Bill Pullman, Melissa Leo	United States	
Final Score	Scott Mann	Dave Bautista, Pierce Brosnan, Ray Stevenson, Julian Cheung	United Kingdom; United States	
The First Purge	Gerald McMurray	Steve Harris, Marisa Tomei, Y'lan Noel, Lex Scott Davis	United States	
Golden Job	Chin Ka-lok	Ekin Cheng, Jordan Chan, Michael Tse	Hong Kong	
Hotel Artemis	Drew Pearce	Jodie Foster, Sterling K. Brown, Sofia Boutella, Charlie Day	United States	
Hunter Killer	Donovan Marsh	Gerard Butler, Gary Oldman, Common, Linda Cardellini, Toby Stephens	United States	
I Am Vengeance	Ross Boyask	Wade Barrett, Anna Shaffer, Gary Daniels	United Kingdom	
Jack Em Popoy: The Puliscredibles	Mike Tuviera	Coco Martin, Maine Mendoza, Vic Sotto	Philippines	Action comedy
Kin	Jonathen and Josh Baker	Myles Truitt, Dennis Quaid, James Franco	United States	
Mandy	Pianos Cosmatos	Nicolas Cage, Andrea Riseborough, Linus Roache	Canada; United States	Action horror
The Marine 6: Close Quarters	James Nunn	The Miz, Shawn Michaels, Becky Lynch	United States	
Master Z: The Ip Man Legacy	Yuen Woo-ping	Zhang Jin, Dave Bautista, Liu Yan, Xing Yu, Michelle Yeoh, Tony Jaa	Hong Kong; China	Martial arts film
Maze Runner: The Death Cure	Wes Ball	Dylan O'Brien, Thomas Brodie-Sangster, Katherine McNamara	United States	
The Meg	Jon Turteltaub	Jason Statham, Rainn Wilson, Cliff Curtis	United States	
Mile 22	Peter Berg	Mark Wahlberg, John Malkovich, Lauren Cohan, Iko Uwais	United States	
Mission: Impossible – Fallout	Christopher McQuarrie	Tom Cruise, Henry Cavill, Sean Harris	United States	
''Nekrotronic''	Kiah Roache-Turner	Ben O'Toole, Monica Bellucci, Caroline Ford	Australia	
The Night Comes for Us	Timo Tjahjanto	Joe Taslim, Julie Estelle, Iko Uwais, Zack Lee	United States; Indonesia	
Operation Red Sea	Dante Lam	Zhang Yi, Huang Jingyu, Hai Qing, Michelle Bai, Zhang Hanyu, Simon Yam, Wang Yanlin	China	
Overlord	Julius Avery	Jovan Adepo, Wyatt Russell, Mathilde Ollivier	United States	Science fiction action
Pacific Rim Uprising	Steven S. DeKnight	John Boyega, Scott Eastwood, Jing Tian	United States	
Peppermint	Pierre Morel	Jennifer Garner, John Gallagher Jr., John Ortiz	United States	
The Predator	Shane Black	Boyd Holbrook, Olivia Munn, Trevante Rhodes	United States	
Rampage	Brad Peyton	Dwayne Johnson, Naomie Harris, Jeffrey Dean Morgan	United States	
Ready Player One	Steven Spielberg	Tye Sheridan, Ben Mendelsohn, Simon Pegg	United States	
Robin Hood	Otto Bathurst	Taron Egerton, Jamie Foxx, Ben Mendelsohn, Jamie Dornan	United States	
Sicario: Day of the Soldado	Stefano Sollima	Benicio Del Toro, Josh Brolin, Catherine Keener	United States	
Skyscraper	Rawson Marshall Thurber	Dwayne Johnson, Neve Campbell, Roland Møller	United States	
Solo: A Star Wars Story	Ron Howard	Alden Ehrenreich, Emilia Clarke, Donald Glover, Woody Harrelson	United States	
Spider-Man: Into the Spider-Verse	Bob Persichetti, Peter Ramsey, Rodney Rothman	Shameik Moore, Jake Johnson, Hailee Steinfeld	United States	Animated superhero
Take Point	Kim Byung-woo	Lee Sung-kyung, Jennifer Ehle, Kevin Durand	South Korea	
Tomb Raider	Roar Uthaug	Alicia Vikander, Walton Goggins, Daniel Wu	United States; United Kingdom	
The Trigonal: Fight for Justice	Vincent Soberano	Ian Ignacio, Sarah Chang, Rhian Ramos, Monsour Del Rosario	Philippines	
Upgrade	Leigh Whannell	Logan Marshall-Green, Harrison Gilbertson, Benedict Hardie	United States	
Venom	Ruben Fleischer	Tom Hardy, Michelle Williams, Riz Ahmed	United States	
We Will Not Die Tonight	Richard V. Somes	Erich Gonzales, Alex Medina, Thou Reyes	Philippines	
The Witch: Part 1. The Subversion	Park Hoon-jung	Kim Da-mi, Jo Min-su, Choi Woo-sik	South Korea	Mystery action

== 2019 ==
Title	Director	Cast	Country	Subgenre/ notes
21 Bridges	Brian Kirk	Chadwick Boseman, Sienna Miller, Stephan James	United States	
Alita: Battle Angel	Robert Rodriguez	Rosa Salazar, Christoph Waltz, Mahershala Ali	United States	
Angel Has Fallen	Ric Roman Waugh	Gerard Butler, Morgan Freeman, Danny Huston, Nick Nolte, Piper Perabo, Jada Pinkett Smith, Lance Reddick	United States	
Anna	Luc Besson	Sasha Luss, Luke Evans, Cillian Murphy, Helen Mirren	France; United States	
Ashfall	Lee Hae-jun	Lee Byung-hun, Ha Jung-woo, Ma Dong-seok	South Korea	
Avengement	Jesse V. Johnson	Scott Adkins, Craig Fairbrass, Thomas Turgoose, Nick Moran, Kierston Wareing, Leo Gregory, Louis Mandylor	United Kingdom	
Avengers: Endgame	Anthony and Joseph Russo	Robert Downey Jr., Chris Evans, Chris Hemsworth, Scarlett Johansson, Mark Ruffalo, Jeremy Renner, Brie Larson, Paul Rudd, Karen Page, Josh Brolin	United States	Superhero film
Bahad	Bryan Wong	Bryan Wong, Marvin Lim, Agusto Libuton, Ron Ron Makarunggala, Rod John Ferolino, Mark Dueñas, Cherwin Panimbatan, Rhodum Sagario, Gene Bayer, Jay Tabligan	Philippines	Historical action drama
Bato (The General Ronald dela Rosa Story)	Adolfo Alix Jr.	Robin Padilla, Beauty Gonzalez, Joko Diaz	Philippines	Biographical action
Captain Marvel	Anna Boden, Ryan Fleck	Brie Larson, Samuel L. Jackson, Jude Law	United States	Superhero film
Captive State	Rupert Wyatt	John Goodman, Ashton Sanders, Vera Farmiga	United States	
Dark Phoenix	Simon Kinberg	James McAvoy, Michael Fassbender, Jennifer Lawrence, Nicholas Hoult, Sophie Turner, Tye Sheridan	United States	Superhero film
Escape Plan: The Extractors	John Herzfeld	Sylvester Stallone, Dave Bautista, 50 Cent, Jaime King, Zhang Jin	United States	
Exit Point	Ronn Rick	Ronnie Ricketts, Jackie Lou Blanco, Alvin Anson, Raechelle Ricketts, Edgar Mande, Renzo Cruz, Jerico Estregan, Joachim Idinye, Sung Joon Park, Natalia Moon	Philippines	
Foxtrot Six	Randy Korompis	Oka Antara, Verdi Solaiman, Chicco Jerhiko, Julie Estelle	Indonesia; United States	Science fiction action
Furie	Lê Văn Tiết	Veronica Ngo, Lê Bình, Pham Anh Khoa	Vietnam	
The Gangster, The Cop, The Devil	Lee Won-tae	Ma Dong-seok, Kim Mu-yeol, Kim Sung-kyu	South Korea	Action thriller
Gemini Man	Ang Lee	Will Smith, Benedict Wong, Clive Owen	United States	Science fiction action
Godzilla: King of the Monsters	Michael Dougherty	Kyle Chandler, Vera Farmiga, Millie Bobby Brown, Ken Watanabe	United States	Monster film
Hellboy	Neil Marshall	David Harbour, Milla Jovovich, Ian McShane	United States	
Hit & Run	Ody C. Harahap	Joe Taslim, Chandra Liow, Tatjana Saphira, Jefri Nichol, Nadya Arina, Yayan Ruhian, Reza Aditya, Qausar Harta Yudana, Peter Taslim, Simone Julia, David Hendrawan, Novi Rahmat Hidayat, Karina Suwandhi, Mathias Muchus, Caitlin North Lewis, Tika Panggabean, Aufa Assagaf, Dayu Wijanto, Mardiyono “Mardi” Sulaiman and Tanta Ginting	Indonesia and South Korea	Action comedy
Hobbs & Shaw	David Leitch	Jason Statham, Dwayne Johnson, Idris Elba	United States	
How to Train Your Dragon: The Hidden World	Dean DeBlois	Jay Baruchel, America Ferrera, Cate Blanchett, Craig Ferguson, Jonah Hill, Kit Harington	United States	
The Informer	Andrea Di Stefano	Joel Kinnaman, Rosamund Pike, Clive Owen, Common, Ana de Armas	United Kingdom	
Ip Man 4: The Finale	Wilson Yip	Donnie Yen, Scott Adkins, Vanness Wu	Hong Kong	
John Wick: Chapter 3 – Parabellum	Chad Stahelski	Keanu Reeves, Halle Berry, Laurence Fishburne, Ian McShane, Mark Dacascos, Lance Reddick	United States	
Maria	Pedring Lopez	Cristine Reyes, Germaine De Leon, KC Montero	Philippines	Action thriller
Men in Black: International	F. Gary Gray	Chris Hemsworth, Tessa Thompson, Liam Neeson	United States	
The Mercenary	Jesse V. Johnson	Dominique Vandenberg, Louis Mandylor, Carmen Argenziano	United States	
Miss Bala	Catherine Hardwicke	Gina Rodriguez, Anthony Mackie	United States	
No Mercy	Im Gyeong-taek	Lee Si-young, Park Se-wan, Choi Jin-ho	South Korea	
Rambo: Last Blood	Adrian Grunberg	Sylvester Stallone, Adriana Barraza, Paz Vega, Yvette Monreal, Sergio Peris-Mencheta, Óscar Jaenada, Joaquín Cosío	United States	
Shazam!	David F. Sandberg	Zachary Levi, Asher Angel, Jack Dylan Grazer, Mark Strong	United States	Superhero
Spider-Man: Far From Home	Jon Watts	Tom Holland, Samuel L. Jackson, Jake Gyllenhaal	United States	Superhero
Star Wars: The Rise of Skywalker	J. J. Abrams	Adam Driver, Daisy Ridley, John Boyega, Oscar Isaac	United States	Space opera
Stuber	Michael Dowse	Dave Bautista, Kumail Nanjiani, Iko Uwais, Karen Gillan	United States	Action comedy
Terminator: Dark Fate	Tim Miller	Linda Hamilton, Arnold Schwarzenegger, Mackenzie Davis, Natalia Reyes, Gabriel Luna, Diego Boneta	United States	Science fiction action
Triple Threat	Jesse V. Johnson	Celina Jade, Iko Uwais, Michael Bisping, Michael Jai White, Scott Adkins, Tiger Chen, Tony Jaa,	United States; Thailand	
The White Storm 2 - Drug Lords	Herman Yau	Andy Lau, Louis Koo, Michael Miu	Hong Kong	

== See also ==
- Action films
- Martial arts films
- Swashbuckler films
