= List of Chinese films of 2010 =

The following is a list of mainland Chinese films first released in year 2010. There were 91 Chinese feature films released in China in 2010.

== Box office ==
The following are the 10 highest-grossing Chinese films released in China in 2010.

Rank	Title	Gross (in million yuan)
1	Aftershock	¥650.157
2	Let the Bullets Fly	¥636.876
3	If You Are the One 2	¥456.097
4	Detective Dee and the Mystery of the Phantom Flame	¥286.199
5	Ip Man 2	¥231.043
6	Sacrifice	¥198.900
7	Little Big Soldier	¥157.287
8	Just Call Me Nobody	¥151.540
9	Under the Hawthorn Tree	¥144.969
10	14 Blades	¥141.817

== Films released ==
Title	Director	Cast	Genre	Notes
14 Blades	Daniel Lee Yan-Kong	Donnie Yen, Zhao Wei	Historical/Action	China-Hong Kong co-production
Adventure of the King	Chung Shu-kai	Richie Ren, Barbie Shu	Comedy	
Aftershock	Feng Xiaogang	Chen Daoming, Zhang Jingchu, Lu Yi	Historical/Drama	
Apart Together	Wang Quan'an			Entered into the 60th Berlin International Film Festival
Buddha Mountain	Li Yu	Sylvia Chang, Fan Bingbing, Bolin Chen	Romance	
The Butcher, the Chef and the Swordsman	Wuershan	Masanobu Andō, Kitty Zhang, You Benchang	Action comedy	
Chongqing Blues	Wang Xiaoshuai	Fan Bingbing		Entered into the 2010 Cannes Film Festival
Confucius	Hu Mei	Chow Yun-fat, Zhou Xun	Biographical/Historical	
Curse of the Deserted	Law Chi-Leung	Kitty Zhang; Shawn Yue	Horror/Thriller	China-Hong Kong co-production
Death and Glory in Changde	Shen Dong	Ray Lui; An Yixuan; Yuen Wankang	Historical	
Detective Dee and the Mystery of the Phantom Flame	Tsui Hark	Andy Lau, Li Bingbing	Historical/Action/Drama	China-Hong Kong co-production
Don Quixote	Ah Gan	Guo Tao; Wang Gang; Karena Lam		
The Double Life	Ning Jing	Zhang Jingchu	Black comedy	
Driverless	Zhang Yang	Liu Ye, Ruby Lin, Gao Yuanyuan, Li Xiaoran, Chen Jianbin, Wang Luodan, Huang Xuan	Romance	
Flirting Scholar 2	Lee Lik-Chi	Huang Xiaoming, Zhang Jingchu	Action/Comedy	
Go Lala Go!	Xu Jinglei	Xu Jinglei; Karen Mok; Pace Wu; Stanley Huang	Romantic comedy	
Heaven Eternal, Earth Everlasting	Li Fangfang	Liu Dong, Huang Ming, Shi Ke	Drama	
Here Comes Fortune	James Yuen	Alan Tam, Chang Chen, Miriam Yeung	Comedy	China-Hong Kong co-production
I Wish I Knew	Jia Zhangke	Zhao Tao	Documentary	
Illusion Apartment	Jiang Guoquan	Xiao Qiang, Ma Tianyu, Linna Yao, Cheung Siu-fai	Horror	
Just Call Me Nobody	Kevin Chu	Xiao Shen Yang; Kelly Lin; Banny Chen	costume comedy	China-Taiwan co-production
The Kidnap	Kris Gu	Chapman To, Sun Xing, Qu Ying, Ye Yiqian	Comedy	
Kung Fu Hip-Hop 2	Bowie Lau; Fu Huayang	Wilson Chen, Wang Zi, Zhou Qiqi, Michael Tse	Musical/Action	
Lan	Jiang Wenli	Zhu Xu, Jiang Wenli, Liu Ye	Biographical	
Last Kung Fu Monk	Peng Zhang Li	Peng Zhang Li, Hu Sang, Kristen Dougherty, Johan Karlberg	Martial Art Drama	China-American co-production
Let the Bullets Fly	Jiang Wen	Chow Yun-fat, Ge You	Comedy	
Life is a Miracle	Guo Changwei	Zhang Ziyi; Aaron Kwok		
Little Big Soldier	Ding Sheng	Jackie Chan, Leehom Wang	Comedy/Historical	China-Hong Kong co-production
A Tibetan Love Song	Jiang Ping	Alex Su	Romance	
Macau 1949	Bao Fuming	Ray Lui	Historical/Action	
Midnight Beating	Zhang Jiabei	Simon Yam; Francis Ng		
My Sassy Girl 2	Joe Ma	Lynn Hung; Leon Jay Williams	Romance/Comedy	
Ocean Heaven	Xue Xiao Lu	Jet Li; Gwei Lun-mei	Drama	China-Hong Kong co-production
Reign of Assassins	John Woo; Su Chao-Bin	Michelle Yeoh; Jung Woo-sung; Wang Xueqi	Martial arts/Suspense/Romance	
Sacrifice	Chen Kaige	Fan Bingbing, Vincent Zhao, Ge You	Drama/History	
True Legend	Yuen Woo-ping	Jay Chou, Michelle Yeoh, Zhou Xun, Vincent Zhao	Historical/Action	China-Hong Kong co-production
Under the Hawthorn Tree	Zhang Yimou	Dongyu Zhou	Romance	
Virtual Recall	Cheung Hoi-ching	Stephen Fung; Cherrie Ying; Tang Yifei	Mystery/Thriller	
Wind Blast	Gao Qunshu	Xia Yu, Charlie Yeung, Wu Jing, Duan Yihong, Francis Ng, Yu Nan	Drama	

== See also ==
- List of Chinese films of 2009
- List of Chinese films of 2011
