= Marriage Cuisine =

- Written by: Juanzi
- Directed by: Jiangang Yan
- Starring: Yan Ni, Li Xin Zhao, Danni Liang, Anlian Yao, Qing Yang, Yang Zhiwen, He Haoyang, Yuanzheng Feng, Wu Jiang, Jiantao Hong, Xiaochong Jiang, Luo Wei, Luan Yuan Hui, Yalin Gao, Johan Karlberg
- Countries of origin: China; Korea
- Original languages: Swedish; Chinese

Production
- Running time: 40 minutes per episode (30 episodes in total)
- Production companies: Beijing Hualu Baina Film & TV

Original release
- Release: 8 September 2014 (China)

Marriage Cuisine (Chinese: 婚姻料理; pinyin: Hūnyīn liàolǐ) is a Chinese TV drama that premiered in 2014.

== Plot ==
Archen and Yangshu are married with one daughter named Taoze. They have been married for 12 years but recently, Yangshu has become too busy with his work as a chemistry professor and has volunteered in a project about a skin cancer cure. However, his work keeps him away from his daughter who needs him in school but since he does not show up, Taoze falls behind in school and has to return home. Archen gets frustrated with Yangshu and makes the decision to divorce him. One year after the divorce, Yangshu becomes famous for his project and Archen starts to have second thoughts as to whether the divorce was a good thing or not. But she finds out that a new woman named Go Go has entered Yangshu's life. Archen decides to forget Yangshu and find a new date. What she doesn't know is that Yangshu secretly wants Archen and his daughter back in his life.

== Leading characters ==
- Archen – a master chef in a 5-star hotel restaurant. She is very stubborn about her cooking as well as her love life. She refuses to take any answers that don't suit her, but that can be her doom as well. Archen is played by the Chinese Hong Kong actress Yan Ni, who made several movies in Hong Kong.
- Yangshu – a professor in chemistry, who took part in a cancer cure research that will be held in Beijing. His job causes him to be away from his family and, as a result, he is divorced by Archen. Despite fame he wants nothing more but to return to his family. Yangshu is played by Swedish Chinese actor Li Xin Zhao, who grew up in Uppsala in Sweden, he made his debut in the Swedish movie The Way Out (Vägen ut). He continued working in China. His role as Yangshu is his first leading role.
- Ma – the mother of Archen and a former actress. She spends her time taking take of her granddaughter Taoze, trying to reason with Archen, and trying to survive the craziness of her other daughter Bei Quan. Ma is played by the actress Danni Liang, who is married to Yuanzheng Feng, who also plays a role in the series as Aiming.
- Bei Chuan – older sister to Archen, a woman who never dates, always works, and sees love as a pessimistic thing. Despite that, she tries to help Archen in her way of happiness. She is played by Qing Yang, a Taiwanese mainland actress.
- Taoze – the daughter of Archen and Yangshu. She is not comfortable with her parents' divorce. She is not happy that her mother is dating others or that her dad has a new girl, Go Go. She is played by a child actress from Shanghai, Yang Zhiwen.
- Go Go – she is the new love interest of Yangshu (if you ask her). She finds out about Yangshu's divorce during her work at his laboratory, and then she puts her plan to work. She will do anything to get Yangshu away from Archen, one way or another. She is played by Dalian actress He Haoyang, and this drama was her acting debut at age 20.

== Supporting characters ==
- Lu Lu – the best friend and co worker for professor Yangshu. He is also secretly in love with Go Go. Despite his love interest, he tries to reason with Go Go not to go too far with her feelings, as it could turn her world upside down. He is played by the actor Xiaochong Jiang, and he has played several TV dramas.
- Teacher Wang – a proud momma's boy, he is the main teacher for Taoze, and has a crush on Archen. When he finds out that Archen is divorced, he take actions a little bit too far, loses control of his feelings, and changes from teacher to stalker. He is played by the Hong Kong actor Wu Jiang who became world-famous for his lead role in A Touch of Sin.
- Aiming – a psychologist and an idol lookalike. Aiming is the third date for Archen. She has a huge crush on him; however, she will soon learn why he doesn't have children and why he has been single all his life. He is played by the famous Hong Kong actor Yuanzheng Feng who is married to the actress Danni Liang. His character was supposed to be a Daniel Wu lookalike but he refused to play the part unless they changed the role to be a Yuanzheng Feng lookalike, so he would be an idol of himself.
- Wu De Feng – a professor of architecture, and a man who adores beauty. He is Archen's first date after her divorce. He is full of charm and has a high respect for Archen, but he loves architecture more than he loves people. He is played by the famous Taiwanese actor Anlian Yao.
- Mr Lee – the craziest business owner in the world. He owns the restaurant that has second place in the top 10 list, and the first place is Archen's 5 star hotel. Mr Lee is convinced that if he manages to hire Archen in his restaurant then he can have first place. He is played by the Taiwanese comedian Jiantao Hong.

== Other characters ==
- Feng Jia Shui – the best friend and co worker of Archen. She has a secret crush on the waiter Tom, and is played by the comedian Luo Wei.
- Tom – the homosexual waiter of the 5 star hotel. He is not very fond of Archen. When his mother tells him to get married or lose his job, he hires Feng Jia Shui to become his wife, but he dislikes her because she is in love with him for real, but business comes before pleasure. He is played by Luan Yuan Hui.
- Wuran – an old school friend of Archen, who hasn't seen her since they were kids. He accidentally tells Archen it's not a good idea to divorce at her age. He is played by the famous TV Beijing actor Yalin Gao.
- Professor Johan – a Swedish professor and the second in command at Yangshu's laboratory. He was supposed to be the first in command, but after he failed an experiment, Yangshu took over the project and trusted him to finish the third sample. He is played by the Swedish actor Johan Karlberg, who is famous from the Chinese movie The Resistance. The role wasn't supposed to be Swedish, it was supposed to be French, and his name was professor Jean, but Johan couldn't speak French and the name was changed to the English "John". But after a coffee break the director heard Johan speak Swedish with the actor Li Xin Zhao, then decided to change the character from English to Swedish and again changed the name to professor Johan.

== Cast ==
- Yan Ni as Archen
- Li Xin Zhao as Yangshu
- Danni Liang as Mother Ma
- Qing Yang as Bei Chuan
- Yang Zhiwen as Taoze
- He Haoyang as Go Go
- Yuanzheng Feng as Liu Aiming
- Wu Jiang as Teacher Wang
- Anlian Yao as Wu De Feng
- Jiantao Hong as Mr Lee
- Xiaochong Jiang as Lu Lu
- Luo Wei as Feng Jia Shui
- Luan Yuan Hui as Lin Tom
- Yalin Gao as Wu Ran
- Johan Karlberg as Professor Johan

== Music ==
The composed music and the song "Qing Ai De" were performed and written by the famous singer Fan Fan. The song hit the music box office in both China and Hong Kong.

The song "Love Will Keep Us Alive" by The Eagles was used in the dinner scene with Archen and Aiming.

The song "Opa Gangnam Star by Psy" is played when Miss Ma and Taoze are dancing together, and several Frank Sinatra songs are played in almost every restaurant scene.

== Books ==
The plot of the TV series is based on two manga books, A Crazy Housewife and A Good Husband.

== Colors ==
The color blue is used a lot in the background, and some clothes and furniture and some material are a crystal clear blue color. The blue color reflects peace and a clear sky, and everybody has a clean aura except Archen, who never wears or has anything of the color blue on her.
