= Wished (film) =

2017 fantasy film by Dayyan Eng

- Movie poster
- Simplified Chinese: 反转人生
- Directed by: Dayyan Eng
- Written by: Justin Malen; Dayyan Eng
- Produced by: Dayyan Eng; Han Zhang
- Starring: Xia Yu; Yan Ni; Victoria Song; Pan Binglong
- Cinematography: Thierry Arbogast
- Edited by: Dayyan Eng
- Music by: Nathan Wang; Rob Cairns; Eric Lee Harper
- Production company: Colordance Pictures
- Distributed by: Edko Films; Lianray Films
- Release date: June 30, 2017 (China)
- Country: China
- Language: Mandarin
- Budget: US$5 million

Wished is a 2017 Chinese fantasy comedy film directed by Dayyan Eng, written by Justin Malen & Dayyan Eng. The film stars Xia Yu, Yan Ni, Pan Binglong and Victoria Song. It was released in China on June 30, 2017. Wished had the highest audience scores (averaging 8.0/10) across the top 4 ticketing platforms for local Chinese comedies released that crowded summer. As an indie-film on limited screens, Wished debuted in third place at the Chinese box office—behind Transformers 5 and a Jackie Chan-produced Chinese sci-fi action film (Reset). It went on to beat market expectations to gross RMB$70 million at the box office in two weeks. According to Entgroup Data, Wished was the most watched feature film online across all movie sites in China during its first week of online release, and racked up a total of 100,000,000+ paid viewings across three of the top movie sites in China after just over a fortnight. Wished was invited to the 2017 Hawaii International Film Festival and won several awards at the Chinese American Film Festival, Los Angeles Film Awards and New York Film Awards. In 2019, Wished was optioned by an American film company to be remade as an American film.

== Synopsis ==
A 30-something salesman is disillusioned with his life after failing to achieve his career goals and breaking up with his girlfriend. He meets a magical celestial being who starts making his old wishes come true — including those from childhood.

== Cast ==
- Xia Yu
- Yan Ni
- Victoria Song
- Pan Binlong
- David Wu
- Daniel Wu (cameo)
- Wang Baoqiang (voice cameo)
- Bao Bei'er (cameo)
- Ning Jing (cameo)
- Mike Sui (cameo)

== Awards ==
- WINNER - Golden Angel Award - 2017 Chinese American Film Festival
- OFFICIAL SELECTION - 2017 Hawaii International Film Festival
- WINNER - Best Editing - 2017 London Independent Film Awards
- WINNER - Best Picture - 2018 New York Film Awards
- WINNER - Best Fantasy Film - 2018 New York Film Awards
- WINNER - Best Actress - 2018 New York Film Awards
- WINNER - Best Score - 2018 New York Film Awards
- WINNER - Best Visual Effects - 2018 New York Film Awards
- WINNER - Best Fantasy Film - 2018 Los Angeles Film Awards
- WINNER - Best Director - 2018 Los Angeles Film Awards
- WINNER - Best Cinematography - 2018 Los Angeles Film Awards
- WINNER - Best Editing - 2018 Los Angeles Film Awards
- WINNER - Best Director Diamond Award - 2018 NYC Indie Film Awards
- WINNER - Best Actor Diamond Award - 2018 NYC Indie Film Awards
- WINNER - Best VFX Diamond Award - 2018 NYC Indie Film Awards
- WINNER - Best Feature Film Gold Award - 2018 NYC Indie Film Awards
