= Jue Ze =

2012 Chinese war fiction political television series

- Official Chinese Poster
- Genre: War
- Written by: Qi Lu Yin
- Directed by: Jin Jun Gao
- Starring: Yue Ma; Yongjian Lin; Ke Hu; Johan Karlberg; Xinyi Li; Victoria Benson; Tenma Shibuya; Yajie Wang; Lui Xia
- Country of origin: China
- Original language: Mandarin
- No. of episodes: 43

Production
- Producer: Xiang Chu Ban Se
- Running time: 45 minutes per episode
- Production company: China Central Television (CCTV)

Original release
- Network: Beijing TV
- Release: 3 December 2012

Jue Ze
- Simplified Chinese: 抉擇
Transcriptions

Jue Ze (Chinese: 抉擇) is a 2012 Chinese war-politicnal television series. It stars Ma Yue. The series focuses on the Japanese invasion of China from 1937 to 1945. It includes post-war antagonists, such as American soldiers and Chinese capitalists.

== Synopsis ==
After a brutal invasion of China by the Imperial Japanese Army in 1937, a Chinese professor in Boston named Wu Ming Tai is compelled by his patriotism to return to Beijing to translate a document for the United Nations. This document is considered to be proof of war crimes committed by the Japanese Army. The Japanese are aware of the Professor's return to China and will do anything to stop the publication of this discovery, including kidnapping his brother and forcing him to become a Japanese citizen.

When the American Army intervenes, they bomb Japanese fortresses. It is claimed, however, that the Americans want to claim China for themselves by taking control of Chinese fortifications. This plan is halted when an American soldier harasses a Chinese student, and the Americans are forced to withdraw, returning China's independence.

Meanwhile, Wu Ming Tai faces another enemy: his co-worker and brother-in-law, Chu Li Fan, a capitalist who wants to "corrupt China".

== Cast ==
- Yue Ma as Wu Ming Tai
- Yongjian Lin as General Zu
- Ke Hu as Ju Ran
- Xinyi Li as Lau Mei
- Tenma Shibuya as Japanese Sergeant Sato
- Sally Victoria Benson as Angelic
- Johan Karlberg as Lieutenant Collins
- Yajie Wang as Lichuan
- Lui Xia as Qing Qing
- Tianlai Hou as Chu Li Fan
- Da Guo as Jinxue Gong
