= Tian Xing Jian (TV series) =

2011 Chinese war fiction political television series

- Chinese poster
- Genre: War
- Written by: Yuan Zhong
- Directed by: Zhong Yu
- Starring: Winston Chao; Johan Karlberg; Feihu Sun; Xun Sun
- Country of origin: China
- Original language: Mandarin
- No. of episodes: 32

Production
- Producer: Xiangyang Yang
- Running time: 45 minutes per episode
- Production company: China Central Television (CCTV)

Original release
- Network: Beijing TV
- Release: 4 April 2011

Tian Xing Jian
- Simplified Chinese: 天行健
Transcriptions

Tian Xing Jian (Chinese mandarin 天行健) is a 2011 Chinese war fiction political television series starring Winston Chao about the Xinhua University history from the building in 1904 to the first opening in 1911 to the Japanese invasion of China from 1937 to 1945 and how it still remain today. The series was made to honor the Xinhua University 100th anniversary but was only aired one season.

== Synopsis ==
Professor Zhou Zixuan and his master travel to America to discuss an international university to be built in Beijing where foreign and Chinese students can co work. But after a civil war that broke out in China during 1904 the Americans are not sure if China are qualified to have an multi university in case of risk, Zhou manage to convince that China is now a peaceful country and manage to get and approval of Xinhua University in 1911. But then came the first Sino-Japanese war and put the country at risk. The Americans want to put down the university but Zhou will do everything ask he can to protect his university. Then the Second World War happened and Xinhua is in middle of it.

== Cast ==
- Winston Chao as Zhou Zixuan
- Johan Karlberg as Counsil Man
- Feihu Sun as Liang Cheng
- Xun Sun as Mei Yiqi
- Yang Zhao as Sicheng
