= Johan Karlberg =

Macau China actor (born 1984)

- Born: March 19, 1984 (age 42); Öland, Sweden
- Occupation: Actor

Johan Karlberg is a Macanese actor, born in 1984 in Sweden, he became an actor in Beijing, China in 2009 and later moved to Macau SAR China in 2020 to continue his acting career in Asia. He is known from Last Kung Fu Monk, The Resistance, Marriage Cuisine, The Edge Of Human, and Return To Earth - Macau Sci-fi (2023).

== Early career ==
In 1995, he began his career at age 11 in a screen test video for a planned Jonny Quest feature film that became a cartoon series instead in 1996.

In early 2000s, he went to Film school in Hvidovre Denmark for student film projects, and joined independent films in Canada, and also some web series in Detroit Michigan.

In 2002, he directed his first short film for MySpace TV called Bridge to the universe.

== Chinese Career 2009-2014 ==
In 2007, he joined YouTube to make online auditions where he was discovered by a Chinese director. He kept working in China for six years from 2009 to 2014.

In 2009, he began his acting debut in the Chinese feature film "Last Kung Fu Monk" a martial art drama about a Shaolin monk that move to New York City and get involved with Russian Mafia. He played the part of "Oleg"he is the Russian mafia boss want to hire the monk to fight for him in an underground fight club. In the movie he worked with the former Shaolin Monk turned actor and director Peng Zhang Li and Chinese actress Hu Sang. The film was released on 1st October 2010 on the Chinese national day around the world.

In 2011, he worked with Peng Zhang Li again in his second feature film "The Resistance". An Action Adventure Ninja movie that take place in World War II. He plays the role of "Schultz" he is the Nazi Commander that sign a deal with the Japanese General, and it's the role he is mostly famous for. The Chinese actress Hu Sang played the part of the Heroine Xiaoyun, and it's the 2nd film they worked together.

In 2014, his bad guy type cast was changed when he played the part of a sensitive Swedish professor in the South Korean - Chinese TV series "Marriage Cuisine", a romantic drama about a divorced woman who learn the hard way of single life difficulties.

Other roles he played are small parts of many famous Chinese war fiction dramas, he co worked with "Winston Chao" in the "Tian Xing Jian (TV Series)" and played the role of Lieutenant Collins in "Jue Ze" from 2012.

== Macau Career & Director debut 2020s ==
In 2020, Johan continued with acting in Macau, he played his first star role of Sebastian in the 2021 Macanese rotoscoping film "Macao 2525". He made his directing debut in the Blade Runner inspired movie “The Edge Of human“ where he played the role of an Android hunter with a troublesome past. He was nominated at BCT Benevento cinema e televisione in Italy for his latest movie Return To Earth - Macau Sci-fi (2023) and he came in 4th place out of 15 finalists.

== Voice Acting for Anwa Clay & Angels Sky ==
In 2021 Johan created his own company called Macao Rotoscoping Movies, he changed the name later to Macao Movies in 2025, he teamed up with Angela Lao and Lucy Sao Wa Iao in 2022, a duo of Mother and Daughter owner of the companies Angels Sky known for 2d animation and Anwa Clay known for claymation artist located in Macau. He debuted his voice acting career in the Angel’s News World Series that was part of the franchise Andrew’s Parallel Worlds. Together they collaborated and helped each other in both Macao Movies and Anwa Clay several animated short films, including the Slamdance Award Winner Never Fall in Love. They are still co working today.

== Filmography ==
| Year | English title | Chinese title | Role | Notes |
|---|---|---|---|---|
| 1995 | Jonny Quest (Screen Test) | | Jonny Quest | |
| 1998 | Police Quest: SWAT 2 | | kid hostage #4 (model) | |
| 2002 | Bridge To The Universe (short film) | | Jake | |
| 2005 | Rejsen (short film) | | Swedish Globethrotter | |
| 2007 | RPG | | Jonathan | |
| 2008 | Star Trek - Osiris | | Brill Tobin | |
| 2010 | Last Kung Fu Monk | 最后的武僧 | ”Oleg” the Russian Mafia Boss | |
| 2011 | Tian Xing Jian (TV Series) | 天行健 | American Counselor | |
| 2011 | The Resistance | 反抗者 | Schultz | |
| 2012 | Jue Ze | 抉擇 | Lieutenant Collins | |
| 2014 | Marriage Cuisine | 婚姻料理 | professor Johan | |
| 2014 | Next station - I love you | 下一站再爱你 | TV Reporter | |
| 2018 | EO Vento Levou | | Cameo | |
| 2019 | I Just Want Peace | | Detective Vladnikov | |
| 2020 | Lord Of Heroes (video game) | | Johan | |
| 2021 | Macao 2525 | 而是一人 | Sebastian | |
| 2021 | Angels News World | | several Roles (Voice Acting) | |
| 2022 | TikToks Acting Challenge | | several Roles | |
| 2022 | The Edge Of Human | 人类的边缘 | Jeter | |
| 2022 | Secret Of The Atlantis | 亚特兰蒂斯的秘密 | Joao | |
| 2023 | Return To Earth - Macau Sci-fi (2023) | 返回地球 | Pilot Li Shuai | |
| 2023 | Blackberrino Cateago animated film | | several Roles (Voice Acting) | |
| 2024 | Durango Wild Lands (Short Film) | | Tom | |
| 2024 | Macproud | | Macproud | |
| 2025 | Never Fall In Love | | several Roles (Voice Acting) | |
| 2025 | My Dream, Your Dream | | several Roles (Voice Acting | |
| 2025 | I Love You, Puppy | | several Roles (Voice Acting) | |
| 2025 | Catia & Eagle | | Eagle / Ben (Voice Acting) | |
| 2025 | Mythology of the Red Samurai | | Red Samurai | |
| 2025 | Rock N Cop | | Ryu Urashiman | |
| 2026 | Wing Commander 2 | | Michael “Iceman” Casey | |
