= Zhao Jiuyi =

Taiwanese actor

Zhao Jiuyi is a Taiwanese actor in the early 2010s he is mostly famous for “Flowers Bloom in Winter”, The Resistance and “Ip Man 3”. He was born in 1985 as Zhao Jun Long but he renamed himself due to his popularity in China.

== Career ==
Zhao Jiuyi made his fame debut in The Resistance. His charm and acting took China by storm and he continued acting in Taiwanese, Hong Kong, and China in TV Series. His first leading role were in the Taiwanese Chinese TV drama “Flowers Bloom in Winter” and he had a small part in the Donnie Yen movie “Ip Man 3”. His latest work were in the action comedy series “A Detectives Housewife”.

== Filmography ==
=== Movies ===
- The Resistance (2011)
- Ip Man 3 (2016)

=== TV series ===
- Flowers Bloom In Winter
- Destined To Love You
- A Detectives Housewife
