= Li Boqing =

Sichuanese artist

Li Boqing (Chinese: 李伯清; born February 1947 in Chengdu) is a Chinese actor and stand-up comedian.

== Biography ==
Before working as a stand-up comic, he had been working as porter, carpenter and chef. He is one of the first performers of “Pingshu” (评书) in Sichuan. Pingshu or “storytelling” is one of forms of entertainment for average people in north China. He became a well-known name in Chengdu in early 1990s when his shows began to be shown on Chengdu Television Station. He has founded the sanda pingshu style(散打评书). The topics of his performances ranges from stories in the Chinese classics such as “Romance of Three Kingdoms” (三国演义) and “Water Margin” (水浒) to modern stories on relationships and everyday life, as well as discussion on traditional ethics. His humorous style of talking is popular in Chengdu, Chongqing and other regions in Sichuan. Li Boqing has also acted as leading role in dialect TV series and movies, such as “the unexpected encounter in the city of ghost” ( 鬼城奇遇), “When three happiness come together”( 三喜临门), “Lottery of a million yuan” (百万彩票) and “The army of mahjong”( 麻将棒棒军). In October 2007, Li Boqing decided to be a Buddhist monk in Sanmei Temple in Pengzhou County (彭州三昧禅林). In an interview, he disclosed that he had been a Buddhist for many years. He chose to live in the temple as a lifestyle after retirement. He also said he would give up all commercial performances but he would attend charity ones.

== See also ==
- Pingshu
- Sichuanese culture
- Chengdu
- Sichuanese dialect
