= Mural (film) =

2011 Hong Kong-Chinese film directed by Gordon Chan

- Promotional poster
- Directed by: Gordon Chan
- Written by: Gordon Chan; Frankie Tam; Maria Wong; Lau Ho-Leung
- Based on: Strange Tales of a Lonely Studio by Pu Songling
- Produced by: Abe Kwong; Gordon Chan
- Starring: Deng Chao; Sun Li; Yan Ni; Collin Chou; Zheng Shuang; Andy On; Bao Bei'er; Ada Liu; Eric Tsang
- Cinematography: Mark Lee Ping-bing
- Edited by: Chan Ki-hop
- Music by: Ikurō Fujiwara
- Production companies: Beijing Enlight Pictures; Top Gun Films; Anhui Television
- Distributed by: Beijing Enlight Pictures (China); Intercontinental Film Distributors (HK) (Hong Kong)
- Release dates: 29 September 2011 (China); 13 October 2011 (Hong Kong)
- Running time: 123 minutes
- Countries: Hong Kong; China
- Language: Mandarin
- Box office: 185 million RMB

Mural (simplified Chinese: 画壁; traditional Chinese: 畫壁; pinyin: Huà Bì; Jyutping: Waa6 Bik1) is a 2011 romantic fantasy film co-written, co-produced and directed by Gordon Chan, which stars Deng Chao, Sun Li, Yan Ni, Collin Chou, Zheng Shuang, Andy On, Bao Bei'er, Ada Liu, and Eric Tsang. A Hong Kong-Chinese co-production, it was drawn from Pu Songling's (1640–1715) collection of supernatural tales Strange Stories from a Chinese Studio.

== Plot ==
The scholar Zhu Xiaolian and his page Hou Xia, on their way to the capital to take the imperial examination, encounter a bandit named Meng Longtan and engage in a fierce fight. Eventually, they arrive at an ancient temple where they are persuaded to reconcile by the Monk BuDong. In the temple, Zhu Xiaolian discovers a mural depicting lifelike figures. While gazing at the mural, Zhu is taken into a fairyland called the "WanHuaLin(Forest of Ten Thousand Flowers)" by a fairy named Peony who emerges from the painting.

In the WanHuaLin, there are no men, only a group of beautiful fairies living under the strict rule of a leader known as "Auntie." Despite their unique skills, the fairies are oppressed by Auntie's authoritarian rule. Auntie forbids them from having feelings for men and is ruthless towards any man who dares to enter the fairyland without permission. In this peculiar paradise, Zhu Xiaolian meets the successor fairy Shaoyao, who helps him avoid being discovered by Auntie and safely return to the human world. However, Peony is caught by Auntie for bringing a man into the fairyland.

Upon returning to his world, Zhu Xiaolian finds that Peony on the mural is suffering as a punishment, and his page informs him that the mural is a depiction of hell. Out of a sense of righteousness, Zhu Xiaolian decides to return to the "Painting Wall" world. With the help of the Monk BuDong, Zhu Xiaolian, along with Hou Xia and Meng Longtan, enters the fairyland. To their surprise, Auntie welcomes the three guests and invites them to choose wives from among the fairies to continue the lineage of the Forest of Ten Thousand Flowers. To avoid suspicion, Zhu Xiaolian pretends to choose Peony's friend Cui Zhu as his wife, while Hou Xia and Meng Longtan also select their wives, unaware that Auntie plans to kill them after using them. Learning that Peony has been detained by Auntie, Zhu Xiaolian seeks Shaoyao's help to rescue her, embarking on a series of magical adventures.

== Cast ==
- Deng Chao as Zhu Xiaolian
- Sun Li as Shaoyao
- Yan Ni as The Aunt
- Collin Chou as Meng Longtan
- Zheng Shuang as Mudan
- Eric Tsang as Monk Budong
- Andy On as Golden Warrior
- Bao Bei'er as Hou Xia, Zhu's servant
- Ada Liu as Yunmei
- Monica Mok as Ding Xiang
- Bao Wenjing as Baihe
- Xia Yiyao as Xuelian
- Du Shiwu as housekeeper
- Xie Nan as Fairy Cuizhu

== Theme music ==
The title song for the movie is also named "Mural". The singers are Deng Chao and Betty Sun.

== Accolades ==
Zheng Shuang won the Best New Actress award at the Hong Kong Film Directors' Guild Award for her performance.
