= Just Call Me Nobody =

- Film poster
- Directed by: Kevin Chu
- Written by: Ning Caishen
- Produced by: Fargo Pi
- Starring: Xiao Shen Yang; Kelly Lin; Banny Chen; Zhao Benshan; Eric Tsang; Jacky Wu; Xiao Xiao Bin
- Cinematography: Du Jie
- Edited by: Chen Po-wen
- Music by: Ricky Ho
- Production company: Beijing Poly-bona Film Distribution
- Release date: 3 December 2010 (China)
- Running time: 94 minutes
- Country: Taiwan
- Language: Mandarin

Just Call Me Nobody (Chinese: 大笑江湖) is a 2010 Taiwanese comedy-martial arts film directed by Kevin Chu. The film is about a bumbling cobbler (Xiao Shen Yang) who becomes a martial arts master.

== Plot ==
In ancient China, a poor shoe repair man Wu Di (Xiao Shen Yang) lives with his mother (Chen Hui-chuen) and is obsessed with martial-arts picture books. Wu Di repairs the shoe of the swordswoman Yuelou (Kelly Lin) and later helps save her in a fight despite having no martial-arts training. She thanks him and says she can be found on Qin Mountain if she is needed. Yuelou is secretly a princess who is due to marry the emperor (Banny Chen) but escape after setting the palace on fire.

== Production ==
Just Call Me Nobody finished filming in later September.

== Release ==
Just Call Me Nobody was released on 3 December 2010 in China and is set to be released in Taiwan on 26 January 2011. On its release in China, the film topped the box office, grossing $9,018,081.

== Reception ==
Derek Elley of Film Business Asia gave the film a rating of three out of ten.
