= The Resistance (film) =

2011 Chinese martial art action film

- Official USA Poster
- Directed by: Peng Zhang Li
- Written by: Peng Zhang Li; Scott Timmins
- Starring: Hu Sang; Jeremy Marr Williams; Peng Zhang Li; Johan Karlberg; Zhao Jiuyi; Zhang Xiao Hua
- Production company: Ningxia Film Group
- Release dates: 10 November 2011; 17 May 2012 (Cannes film festival)
- Running time: 89 minutes
- Country: China
- Languages: English; Chinese; Japanese

The Resistance (Chinese: 反抗者; pinyin: Fǎnkàng zhě) is a Chinese martial arts action film set during World War II, directed by Peng Zhang Li.

The Resistance is inspired by the beginning of the Japanese invasion of China where over 300,000 people in the capital of Nanjing were massacred. The movie mixes an epic tale of revenge with elements of martial art, ninja, adventure, and war movies.

== Plot ==
In 1940 during the Second World War, a city named Shichen is controlled ruthlessly by general Takeshi and his imperial Japanese army. A masked murderer known as "The Black Dress Killer" is systematically killing Japanese soldiers, working his way to the top Japanese general, who is responsible for many deaths of men and women, including Xiaoyun's family. Xiaoyun is a peasant girl who joined the Chinese resistance to avenge her family. Meanwhile, an American reporter is sent to China to uncover the truth about the unrest between China and Japan. What he finds threatens his own life and later forces him to join the Chinese Resistance.

== Cast ==
- Hu Sang as Xiaoyun
- Jeremy Marr Williams as Steven
- Peng Zhang Li as Takeshi
- Zhang Xiao Hua as Xiaolin
- Zhao Jiuyi as Chen Xi
- Johan Karlberg as Schultz
- Qiu Wu Tong as Ming Ming
- Li Yin as Feng Qing
- Zhang Ming Fang as Bangsu
- Li Zhong He as Laozhou
- Ma Hong Jing as Killer Geisha
- Yin Wang as Akita

== Location ==
The Resistance was shot over seven months from October 2010 to April 2011 at Ningxia Film Studio, some scenes were shot at Zhejiang Province and Taohua Island, it was the first film shot there.

== Released ==
The Resistance was released on November 10, 2011. It screened at the 2012 Cannes Film Festival on May 17, 2012. After a limited run in theaters in September, 2012, its DVD was released on February 12, 2013 in North America, 17 June 2013 in The UK & Ireland, 3 October 2013 in Netherlands & Belgium, and 3 April 2014 in Indonesia.
