= Mr. & Mrs. Incredible =

2011 Hong Kong-Chinese film by Vincent Kok

- Film poster
- Directed by: Vincent Kok
- Written by: Vincent Kok; Steven Fung; Chan Po-chun; Shu Huan; Joyce Chan
- Produced by: Peter Chan; David Chan; Peter Tsi; Jojo Hui
- Starring: Louis Koo; Sandra Ng
- Cinematography: Peter Ngor
- Edited by: Azrael Chung; Shirley Yip
- Music by: Raymond Wong
- Production companies: We Pictures; Stellar Mega Films
- Distributed by: We Distributions
- Release date: 3 February 2011
- Running time: 100 minutes
- Countries: Hong Kong; China
- Languages: Cantonese; Mandarin

Mr. & Mrs. Incredible (Chinese: 神奇俠侶) is a 2011 action comedy film directed by Vincent Kok and starring Louis Koo and Sandra Ng as the titular protagonists. A Hong Kong-Chinese co-production, the film was released on 3 February 2011 in both Hong Kong and mainland China.

== Cast ==
- Louis Koo as Gazer Warrior
- Sandra Ng as Aroma Woman
- Wen Zhang as Zhuen Huang /King Kong / Emperor
- Wang Po-chieh as Grandmaster Blanc
- Li Qin as Blue Phoenix
- Zhou Bo as He
- Chapman To as Drunk
- Li Jing as Real estate agent / Doctor
- He Yunwei as Evil Ant
- Wang Wenbo
- Da Zhangwei
- Liang Long as Martial arts grandmaster
- Yao Lan as Martial arts grandmaster
- Li Ziqiang as Martial arts grandmaster
- Sun Quan as Martial arts grandmaster
- Wu Zekun as Martial arts grandmaster
- Huang Xiaolan as No. 7
- Steven Fung as Soldier
- Vincent Kok as Soldier
- Zhang Aiqin(Chinese Egghead)

== Release ==
To promote the film and tourism and Hong Kong, a 3D animated film showing the two lead actors from the film was released. Mr. & Mrs. Incredible was set to open in Australia, China, Hong Kong, Malaysia, New Zealand and Singapore on 2 February 2011. It was released on 3 February 2011 in China and Hong Kong.

FUNimation Entertainment released the film in the United States in autumn (September/October) of 2012 on DVD under the name Incredibly Ever After.

Mr. & Mrs. Incredible grossed $630,199 on its opening week in Hong Kong and placed fifth in its weekend box office and has since grossed a total of $1,032,487.

== Reception ==
Film Business Asia gave the film a five out of ten rating, stating "the comedy is not sustained enough, or broad enough, to inspire real laughs rather than just smiles, and the action is largely crammed into the final 15 minutes with the sudden appearance of a plot and a super-villain." Variety gave the film a positive review, praising the script and comparing the two leads to William Powell and Myrna Loy. The Special Broadcasting Service gave the film three stars out of five, finding that the film "delivers the crowd-pleasing goods in its own eccentric way." but lacked comic subtlety. The review also compared the film to The Incredibles stating that the "greatest superhuman feat is avoiding a court date with the suits at Pixar – the shameless similarities to The Incredibles (2004) are there for all to see."
