= My Own Swordsman =

- Poster
- 武林外传
- Directed by: Shang Jing
- Production companies: China Film Group Corporation; Bei Jing Union Film Industry Investment; Zhonglian Jinghua Media (Beijing); Beijing Galloping Horse Media; Beijing Guoli Changsheng Entertainment; China Movie Channel SARFT; Air Force TV Art Centre
- Distributed by: China Film Group Corporation
- Release date: January 26, 2011
- Running time: 92 minutes
- Country: China
- Language: Mandarin
- Box office: CN¥196 million

My Own Swordsman (Chinese: 武林外传) is a 2011 Chinese period action comedy film directed by Shang Jing and a sequel to the 2006 series of the same name. The film was released on January 26, 2011.

This film criticizes the "wuxia culture" that promotes violence, and imitates, satirizes and criticizes the social phenomena of the time.

== Cast ==
- Yan Ni
- Yao Chen
- Yi Sha
- Entai Yu
- Hongjie Ni
- Chao Jiang
- Jian Xiao
- Yueli Yue
- Lei Wang
- Wu Ma
- Zhang Meng

== Reception ==
=== Box office ===
The film earned CN¥196 million at the Chinese box office.
