= Last Kung Fu Monk =

2010 Chinese American martial art film

- Official German poster
- Directed by: Peng Zhang Li
- Written by: Peng Zhang Li; Todd McGorry
- Starring: Peng Zhang Li; Kristen Dougherty; Justin Morck; Johan Karlberg; Kate Forsaz; Hu Sang; Jonathan Sollis
- Release date: 1 October 2010
- Running time: 90 minutes
- Countries: China; United States
- Languages: English; Chinese

Last Kung Fu Monk (Chinese: 最后的武僧; pinyin: Zuìhòu de wǔ sēng) is a Chinese martial art drama from 2010 that was filmed and co worked with both China and United States. The movie is the debut directing by Peng Zhang Li, and the story is inspired by his own life as a monk and his new life in a foreign land.

== Plot ==
As a child, young Li Long get separated from his brother. Later he get abandoned in the forest where a shaolin monk save him and let him become a shaolin. Years goes by and Li Long receive information of his brothers whereabouts. When Li Long discover his brother has died in a car crash with his wife, and he now has a nephew that is all alone in New York, he choose to abandon his life as a monk and move to United States of America. Once in America he befriended the social worker Sarah who has taken care of his Nephew Michael. He also meet Dave, who is an admire of shaolin, and help Li Long to open a Kung Fu School. But what Li Long doesn't know is a Russian Mafia leader by the name Oleg has borrowed money to Dave and wants the money back. But after Li Long interrupted a match in his fight club, Oleg has given the monk two choices, one is fight for him in the club or he kidnap his student Mei. No longer a peaceful monk but a fighter of the most dark and brutal combat ever seen.

== Cast ==
- Peng Zhang Li as Li Long
- Kristen Dougherty as Sarah
- Justin Morck as Dave
- Major Curda as Michael
- Kate Forsaz as Emily
- Jonathan Sollis as Officer Cusamano
- Johan Karlberg as Oleg
- Hu Sang as Mei
- Bing Lei Li as Lam
- Eric Yang as Mei's Brother
- Stephanie Yang as Mei's Sister
- Cindy Carino as Mafia Girlfriend
