= Yan Ni (actress) =

Chinese actress (born 1971)

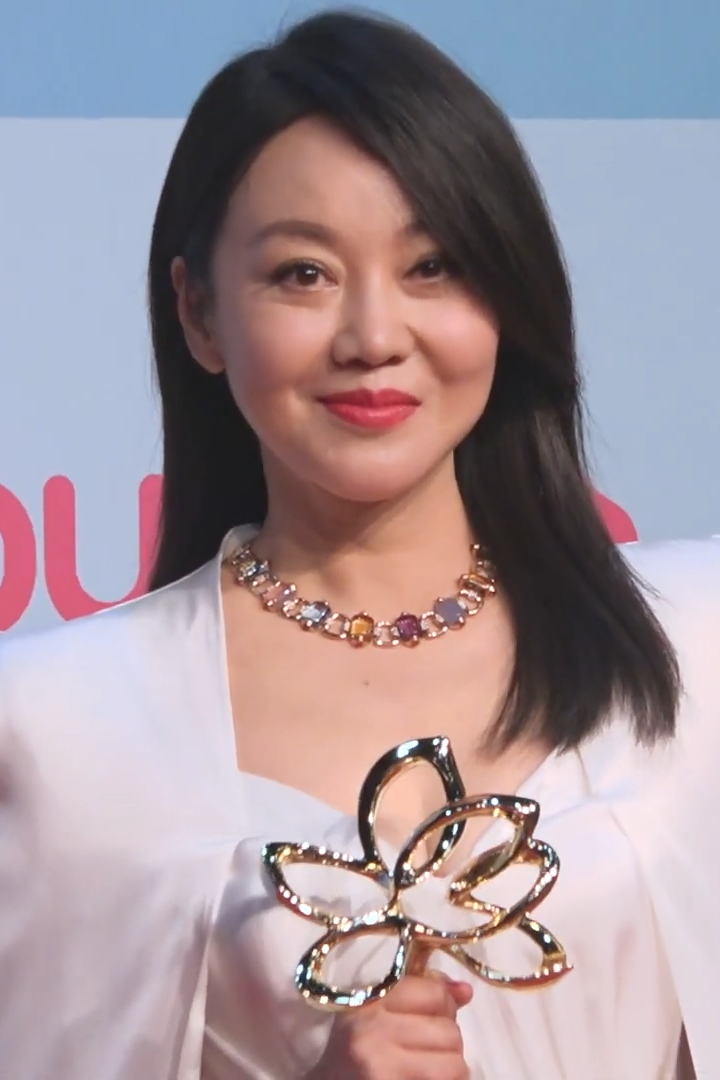
- Yan in 2020
- Born: March 10, 1971 (age 55); Xi'an, Shaanxi, China
- Education: People's Liberation Army Academy of Art; Xi'an Jiaotong University
- Occupation: Actress
- Children: 1

Yan Ni (simplified Chinese: 闫妮; traditional Chinese: 閆妮; pinyin: Yán Ní; born 10 March 1971 in Xi'an, Shaanxi), born Yan Kaiyan (simplified Chinese: 闫凯艳; traditional Chinese: 閆凱艷; pinyin: Yán Kǎi Yàn), is a Chinese film and television actress. She works for the Television Art center of the People's Liberation Army Air Force.

Yan ranked 54th on Forbes China Celebrity 100 list in 2015.

== Biography ==
Yan Ni was born in Xi'an, Shaanxi. Yan's parents are ordinary workers, and all her family still live in Xi'an. After high school, she enrolled at a financial college to study accounting. Two years later she succeeded in gaining admission to an art organization of the People's Liberation Army (PLA) in Lanzhou, and then went on to enroll at the PLA's Art School in Beijing.

Yan started acting in 1992. In 1999 she had her first cinematic role, playing Qiqoqiqo Ma in the film Cog and Hen. Yan rose to fame for her role as Tong Xiangyu in My Own Swordsman, an 80 episode TV comedy-drama that tells the story of the happenings in a tavern during the Ming Dynasty. After My Own Swordsman she played secretary Xiang Yunxiu in National Action and played Niu Xianhua in The North Wind. Yan was awarded a Golden Eagle Award in 2010 for her role in The Wind From North.

In 2011 Yan had a supporting role in director Dayyan Eng's bilingual film Inseparable, which starred Oscar-winner Kevin Spacey. The film premiered at the Busan International Film Festival and was released in cinemas in China and other territories worldwide. In 2017 she reunited with her The North Wind co-star Xia Yu and director Dayyan Eng to star in the fantasy/comedy Wished, which debuted at the box office with the highest audience scores across the top four ticketing platforms for local Chinese comedies released that summer.

Yan will next be seen in the 2021 Hong Kong film Reindeer alongside Hu Ge.

In 2017, he appeared in the TV drama Mr. Right (also known as The Master of the House).

In November 2019, she was nominated for Best Actress in a Contemporary Chinese TV Drama at the 26th Huading Awards, based on audience satisfaction with the top 100 Chinese TV dramas, for her performance in Growing Pain.

In August 2020, she won the Best Leading Actress award at the 26th Magnolia Awards for her performance in Growing Pain.

In 2022, she starred in the film The Final Truth.

== Personal life ==
Yan has an ex-husband and daughter, who is also an actress.

== Filmography ==
=== Film ===
Year	English title	Chinese title	Role	Notes/Ref.
1992	Woman Avengers	复仇的女人	Tong Mei	
2000		禧娃	Ji Ting	
2000		公鸡打鸣，母鸡下蛋	Ma Qiaoqiao	
2000		祝你平安	Ma Yan	
2001	Hot Boys	六月男孩	Wang Xiaoni	
2002	Legend of Half Bowl Village	半碗村的传奇	Xu Qi	
2002	Turn Over	翻身	Lu Yan	
2002	Sandstorm	大沙暴	Feng Ru	
2003		西贡姿色	Cui Niao	
2003		非常周末	Ye Xiaolian	
2004		心中的圣地	He Xiulan	
2004	Defending Reputation	疑案忠魂	Policewoman	
2004		上班	Lanzi	
2004		张思德	Yin Li	
2004	Neighbour	对门儿	He Dongmei	
2005	Stolen Life	生死劫	Sichuan woman	
2007		金猪贺岁	Yang Pingping	
2007	A big potato	别拿自己不当干部	Han Yuehua	
2007	Falling In Love	追爱总动员	Zhu En	
2007		镖行天下之天下镖局	Liu Xiangyun	
2007	Crossed Lines	命运呼叫转移	Wang Shen	
2008	Kung Fu Dunk	大灌篮	Teacher Ni	
2009	Cow	斗牛	Jiu'er	
2009	A Simple Noodle Story	三枪拍案惊奇	Boss	
2010	True Legend	苏乞儿	Lady Boss	Cameo
2011	My Own Swordsman	武林外传	Tong Xiangyu	
2011	All's Well, Ends Well 2011	最强喜事	Dream	
2011	Mural	画壁	Aunt	
2011	Magic to Win	开心魔法	Liu Huali	
2012	The Great Magician	大魔术师	Third madame	
2012	Inseparable	形影不离	CEO Yang	
2012	11 Flowers	我11	Deng Meiyu	
2014	Coming Home	归来	Department Head Lee	
2014	Night of Adventure	疯狂72小时	Xu Sanna	
2015	Monster Hunt	捉妖记	Luo Bing	
2016	The New Year's Eve of Old Lee	过年好	Li Yangduo	
2016	Some Like It Hot	情圣	Ma Lilian	
2016	The Wasted Times	罗曼蒂克消亡史	Mother Wang	
2016	Relocate	搬迁	Liu Chunyan	
2017	Special Encounter	美容针	Li Tangzhen	
2017	Wished	反转人生	Shangguan Furong	
2017	Our Shining Days	闪光少女	Chen Jing's mother	Cameo
2018	I Am Your Mom	我是你妈	Qin Meili	
2018	Good Luck Dad	让我怎么相信你	Liang Dongmei	
2018	A Fangirl's Romance	迷妹罗曼史	Gao Pei	
2019	Push and Shove	狗眼看人心		
2019	At Last	玩命三日		
2019	Two Tigers	两只老虎		
2020	My People, My Homeland	我和我的家乡		
2021	Reindeer	驯鹿		

=== Television series ===
Year	English title	Chinese title	Role	Notes/Ref.
1997		三个姑娘一个兵		
2000		闲人马大姐	Niu Haitang	
2001		永不回头	Guo Yan	
2001		警察李“酒瓶”	Xiao Pei	
2001	General Zhu De	朱德元帅	Kang Keqing	
2002	Meeting Aquarium	海洋馆的约会	Xin Qi	
2002	The Fire General	火帅		
2002		寻人档案	Feng Huiying	
2003	Cadre	干部	Tian Jinxiu	
2003		行棋无悔	Cheng Li	
2004		炊事班的故事2	Nurse Lan	
2004	Health Express	健康快车	Yan Wenxiu	
2004	History of the Sky	历史的天空	Madame Daochuan	
2005	A Mission	使命		Cameo
2005	My Heart Fly	我心飞翔	Zhang Yuchen	
2005	Changping of the War	铁血长平	Lady Jia	
2006	My Own Swordsman	武林外传	Tong Xiangyu	
2006		长大不容易	Shu Weiran	
2007	Ming Dynasty in 1566	大明王朝1566	Consort Li	
2007		房前屋后	Tang Yuxiu	
2007		炊事班的故事3	Nurse Lan	
2008		中国神探	Zheng Qiuju	
2008	Six Cities	都市六人行	Tong Xiangyang	Cameo
2008	Next Life to be your Woman	下辈子做你的女人	Liu Hanxiang	
2009	Police Station	派出所的故事	Yan Yu	
2009		卫生队的故事	Nurse Lan	
2009	Unrivaled Jack-of-all-Trades	无敌三脚猫	Zhao Xiaochen	
2009	North Wind Blowing	北风那个吹	Niu Xianhua	
2009	Going Home	回家	Zhou Yan	
2009		国家行动	Xiang Yunxiu	
2009		三七撞上二十一	Deng Youzhen	
2009	The Eloquent Ji Xiaolan	铁齿铜牙纪晓岚	Ge Song'er	
2010	Founders	奠基者	Liu Qinge	
2010	LOHAS Family	乐活家庭	Yan Danni	Season 1-2
2010	Zhang Xiaowu's Spring	张小五的春天	Zhang Xiaowu	
2010	Never Turn Around	永不回头	He Liping	
2011		大学生士兵的故事	Doctor Chen	Season 1-2
2012		女子军魂	Ling Fengxia	
2012	The Legend of Chu Liuxiang	楚留香新传		
2013		亲爱的	Li Baoli	
2014	A Servant of Two Masters	一仆二主	Tang Hong	
2014	Life Revelation	生活启示录	Yu Xiaoqiang	
2014	Marriage Cuisine	婚姻料理	Ma Ahqin	
2015	Wang Dahua Revolutionary Career	王大花的革命生涯	Wang Dahua	
2015	Ex-husbands	前夫求爱记	Bao Xiaolei	
2015	Youth Assemble	青春集结号	Instructor Yan	
2016	Atonement	爱的追踪	Wen Hao	
2016	Vive les femmes	太太万岁	Ye Shuxin	
2017	Master Healing	复合大师	Gu Xiaoyi	
2017	Top Secret	绝密543	Zhao Yingqiu	
2019	Simple Happiness	小幸福		Cameo
2019	Growing Pain	少年派	Wang Shengnan	
2019	The Eyas	飞行少年		Cameo
2020	Raiders of the New Way	一步登天	Shen Baoyan	
2020	People's Property	人民的财产	Shi Hongxing	
2020	The Stage	我待生活如初恋		
2021	Minning Town	闽宁镇	Magistrate Yang	

== Accolades ==
Year	Award	Category	Nominated work	Ref.
2009	15th Shanghai Television Festival	Most Popular Actress	North Wind Blowing	
2009	27th Flying Apsaras Awards	Outstanding Actress	North Wind Blowing	
2010	25th China TV Golden Eagle Award	Audiences' Choice for Actress	North Wind Blowing	
2010	8th China Golden Eagle TV Arts Festival	Best Performing Arts Award	North Wind Blowing	
2010	16th Chunyan Awards	Best Actress	North Wind Blowing	
2010	10th Changchun Film Festival	Most Popular Actress	Cow	
2012	8th Chinese American Film Festival	Best Actress	11 Flowers	
2014	10th Chinese American Film Festival	Best Actress (Television)	A Servant of Two Masters	
2015	16th Huading Awards	Best Supporting Actress	Coming Home	
2015	2nd The Actors of China Award Ceremony	Best Actress (Ruby)	—N/a	
2016	1st Chinese Film Festival in Italy	Best Actress	Relocate	
2017	1st Marianas International Film Festival	Best Actress	Relocate	
2017	17th Chinese Film Media Awards	Best Supporting Actress	The Wasted Times	
2018	3rd European Independent Film Awards	Best Actress	Wished	
2018	2nd New York Film Awards	Best Actress	Wished	
2020	26th Shanghai Television Festival	Best Actress	Growing Pains	
