= Peng Zhang Li =

- Born: January 1, 1971 (age 55); China
- Education: Shaolin Monk

Peng Zhang Li is a 32nd-generation monk who started training at the age of three at the Shaolin Temple in China. He has traveled the world demonstrating his art from the temple.

At the age of twenty-two, he left for the Netherlands for a new life and set up a stage show about the martial arts which ran for five years.

In 2000, Zhang moved to New York to start a martial arts school. Later he joined work on documentaries about Shaolin, which started a new career for him in film. He has produced, written, and acted in a range of films, in which he depicts the spirit of Shaolin. His films have been co-produced between his homeland China and his current country of residence, the USA. He is mostly known for his movies Last Kung Fu Monk and The Resistance.

== Career ==
In the early 2000s Zhang Li began in documentaries about Shaolin, Shaolin Ulysses: Kung Fu Monks in America, where he explains his background of Shaolin and his life in America.

2006 Zhang Li made his acting debut in an American horror thriller movie Tooth Fairy.

2010 Zhang Li made his directing debut in the martial art drama Last Kung Fu Monk where he also played the leading role of the Shaolin Monk Li Long. A story of a Shaolin Monk who travels to New York but ends up in trouble with the Mafia.

2011 Zhang Li acted and directed his second movie The Resistance, a WWII drama mix with Ninja action and Zorro adventure. The movie entered Cannes Film Festival 17 May 2012 and became a Top DVD seller for 3 months in 2013.

Peng Zhang Li continued working with movies during 2012 and 2013, including a similar movie to Last Kung Fu Monk named The Man From Shaolin, and Zhang Li made a name for himself in the industry as the man from Shaolin to Kung Fu Master to actor and director.
