= Hu Sang =

Chinese actress

- Born: November 10, 1988 (age 37); Inner Mongolia, China
- Education: Central Academy of Drama

Hu Sang (Chinese: 胡桑; born 10 November 1988) is a Chinese actress best known for her roles in the films Fatal Invitation and The Resistance.

== Career ==
In 2000 Hu Sang was admitted to the Beijing Dance Academy High School. In 2012 she graduated from Central Academy of Drama in Beijing. She first appeared in 2008 film Nǚ'ér chuán, playing the heroine Fragrance.

In 2010 Hu made an international debut as a supporting role "Mei" in Last Kung Fu Monk.

In 2011 Hu played the heroine in her first leading role in The Resistance.

In 2012 Hu appeared in the TV series Wànshuǐqiānshān fēngyǔ qíng.

Other works include Fatal Invitations, a horror thriller from 2011.

== Filmography ==
=== Movies ===
- Last Kung Fu Monk (2010)
- The Resistance (2011)
- Fatal Invitation (2011)

=== TV series ===
- A Good Husband (2008)
- Long Journey of Love (2012)
- Fox Fairy (2013)
- Flower Carve (2014)
- Single Villa (2015)
