= Brannon =

Brannon is both a surname and a given name. Notable people with the name include:

== Given name ==
- Brannon Braga (born 1965), American television producer, director and screenwriter
- Brannon Condren (born 1983), American football safety

== Surname ==
- Ann Brannon (born 1958), British fencer
- Ash Brannon (born 1969), American animator, writer and director
- Barbara Brannon, major general in the United States Air Force
- Brittany Dawn Brannon (born 1988), American actress, TV host, model and beauty pageant titleholder
- Buster Brannon (1908–1979), American football and basketball player and coach
- Chad Brannon (born 1979), American actor
- Charles E. Brannon (1919–1942), United States Naval Aviator during World War II
- Cheney Brannon (born 1973), American rock drummer
- Doug Brannon (born 1961), American politician from South Carolina
- Earl W. Brannon (1889–1952), American football coach
- Frank Brannon (born 1965), American book and paper artist
- Fred C. Brannon (1901–1953), American film director of the 1940s and 1950s
- Greg Brannon (born 1960), American physician and political activist
- Harry Brannon (1920–1991), American popular singer
- Henry Brannon (1837–1914), Justice of the Supreme Court of Appeals of West Virginia
- John Brannon (born 1961), American hardcore punk vocalist
- John Brannon (American football) (born 1998), American football player
- Kippi Brannon (born 1966), American country music singer
- Matthew Brannon (born 1971), American artist
- Max Brannon (born 1933), American politician from Georgia
- Philip Brannon (1817–1890), British artist, engraver, writer, printer, architect and civil engineer
- Teddy Brannon (1916–1989), American jazz and blues pianist
