= John Brannon =

John Brannon may refer to:

- John Brannon (American football) (born 1998), American football cornerback
- John Brannon (musician) (born 1961), American singer

== See also ==
- Brannon
- John Brannen (basketball) (born 1974), American basketball coach
- John Brannen (singer) (born 1952), American singer-songwriter
