= Sushi Typhoon =

Japanese film production company

- Company type: Subsidiary
- Industry: Film
- Founded: 2010
- Headquarters: Tokyo, Japan
- Area served: Worldwide
- Key people: Yoshinori Chiba (producer)
- Products: Motion pictures
- Parent: Nikkatsu Corporation
- Website: Sushi-Typhoon.com

Sushi Typhoon is a Japanese genre film production company founded in 2010 and currently owned by media conglomerate Nikkatsu Corporation, Japan's oldest existing film studio.

== History ==
Sushi Typhoon was founded in 2010 as a subsidiary of Nikkatsu, with the intent to create low-budget horror, science fiction, and fantasy films aimed at an international audience. Zeiram producer Yoshinori Chiba is credited as Sushi Typhoon's creator and oversees the company's full production schedule. Since its inception, the company has produced seven feature films. The label was put on indefinite hiatus in early 2012, and has produced no new films since.

== Staff ==
The core Sushi Typhoon staff consists of producer Chiba; directors Takashi Miike (noted in the company's production trailer as its "head chef"), Yoshihiro Nishimura, Sion Sono, Noboru Iguchi, Tak Sakaguchi, Yudai Yamaguchi, and Seiji Chiba; action director Yuji Shimomura; visual effects supervisor Tsuyoshi Kazuno; and art director Yoshiki Takahashi. Former New York Asian Film Festival co-director Marc Walkow headed Sushi Typhoon's American division and international festival bookings.

== Films ==
As of 2011, Sushi Typhoon has produced the following feature films:

- Alien vs Ninja (2010)
- Mutant Girls Squad (2010)
- Cold Fish (2011)
- Deadball (2011)
- Helldriver (2011)
- Karate-Robo Zaborgar (2011)
- Yakuza Weapon (2011)

Funimation released Alien vs Ninja on Blu-ray and DVD both subtitled and with an English dub. The Collective released Cold Fish on DVD both subtitled and with an English dub in association with Vivendi Entertainment. The rest of the films have been released by Well Go USA on Blu-ray subtitled only. All of these releases are currently out-of-print.
