= Woolman =

Woolman is an English surname. Those bearing it include:

- Edna Woolman Chase (1877–1957), fashion journalism entrepreneur
- Collett E. Woolman (1889–1966), airline entrepreneur
- Harry Woolman (1909–1996), stunt driver
- John Woolman (1720–1772), American religious leader and social activist
- Mary Schenck Woolman (1860–1940), pioneer in vocational education
- Stephen Woolman, Lord Woolman (b. 1953), British jurist
