= Black Belt (2007 film) =

- DVD cover
- Directed by: Shunichi Nagasaki
- Written by: George Iida
- Starring: Akihito Yagi; Tatsuya Naka; Yuji Suzuki; Yosuke Natsuki; Fuyuhiko Nishi
- Cinematography: Masato Kaneko
- Edited by: Hirohide Abe
- Music by: Naoki Satō
- Production companies: Kuro-Obi Partners; Bandai Visual; Cross Media; Hexagon Pictures; Cafe Groove; Harajuku Sun-Ad; Kiccorit
- Distributed by: Toei Company
- Release date: October 13, 2007 (Japan)
- Running time: 95 minutes
- Country: Japan
- Language: Japanese

Black Belt, known as Kuro-Obi (Japanese: 黒帯) in Japan, is a 2007 Japanese martial arts drama film directed by Shunichi Nagasaki. It focuses mainly on the martial art of karate. It is notable for excluding the usual exaggerations of the genre. The lead roles were played by karate experts, and no special effects were used. In the film, three students of an elderly karate master decides among themselves on who deserves their master's black belt.

== Plot ==
Japanese-occupied Manchuria, 1932 as the corrupt leaders of the Japanese army are trying to take over all the karate dojos (training halls) for their own benefit. A Japanese military detachment arrives at the Shibahara dojo, and demands it vacated, as the Japanese army wants to seize it for themselves. Taikan (Tatsuya Naka 7th Dan JKA Shotokan karate), one of the top students, challenges the leader of the detachment, Captain Tanihara. Another senior student, Choei (Yuji Suzuki, 1st Dan Kyokushin karate), tries to stop this, thus causing one of the soldiers to slash his arm with a sword, permanently disabling him. After Taikan and Giryu (Akihito Yagi 7th Dan Meibukan Gōjū-ryū karate) drive the soldiers out in a series of duels, the master Eiken Shibahara (Yosuke Natsuki) (whose dojo is located on the southern Japanese island of Kyushu) dies before passing on the black belt to his successor. His top 3 pupils Taikan, Giryu and Choei, must decide amongst themselves who deserves it the most.

After they bury their master, they are forced to leave the dojo and go with the Japanese army. While on the way to the camp, they are encountered by the children of Captain Tanihara, who sought retribution after their father committed suicide due to his defeat by Giryu. Giryu is stabbed, but is rescued afterwards by a boy named Kenta, and aided by his elder sister, Hana, and father, Kenkichi. Consequently, Taikan and Choei are training new military recruits. During Giryu's stay at Kenkichi's household, he learns that a gang has been harassing the family and expressed their desire to take Hana away to be sold to a brothel. Initially, Giryu refuses to fight the gangsters, but is eventually persuaded by Kenta. Giryu finds the gang's hideout, he initially gains the upperhand, but is forced to stop after one of the gangsters managed to capture Kenta. While the gangsters beat Giryu, Kenta fortunately finds Taikan, who rushes to Giryu's aid. Having enough of Giryu's benevolence and hesitation in using karate to hurt people, Taikan leaves to focus on his duel with Takaomi Togo, another karate master, whom Taikan later kills, despite Choei's protests. Giryu and Kenta save Hana, as well as other abducted girls, and Hana is reunited with Kenkichi. The Imperial Japanese Army later declares Giryu a criminal, and General Hidehisa Goda orders his arrest. Choei reprimands Taikan for his negligence in saving Giryu, as well as for killing Togo. The gangs and the army later find Giryu in an open field; Goda threatens to shoot Giryu if he does not surrender. While Giryu is advancing toward Goda, Taikan arrives and knocks Goda out and challenges Giryu to a final duel. Giryu and Taikan both exchanged blows until the former delivers a hammer fist to Taikan and the two fell to the ground out of exhaustion. Taikan later apologizes to Giryu for his past actions, saying he finally understood the meaning of their master's karate style. In his dying breath, he declares Giryu to be the true successor to their master's black belt.

The epilogue then reads that Giryu, with Choei's help, opened his own karate dojo while he and Taikan (in his memory) are performing kata.

== Cast ==
- Akihito Yagi as Giryu
- Tatsuya Naka as Taikan
- Yuji Suzuki as Choei
- Yosuke Natsuki as Sensei Eiken Shibahara
- Fuyuhiko Nishi as Sensei Takaomi Togo
- Shinya Owada as General Hidehisa Goda
- Takayasu Komiya as Ohmoji
- Hakuryu as Captain Kiichi Tanihara
- Tarō Suwa as Kenkichi
- Arashi Fukasawa as Kenta
- Narumi Konno as Hana
- Kimika Yoshino as Chiyo
