= The Tale of Iya =

2013 Japanese drama film

- Film poster

Japanese name
- Kanji: 祖谷物語 おくのひと
Transcriptions
- Romanization: Iya Monogatari - Oku no Hito
- Directed by: Tetsuichirō Tsuta
- Screenplay by: Tetsuichirō Tsuta; Masaya Kawamura; Masayuki Ueda
- Produced by: Tetsuichirō Tsuta
- Starring: Rina Takeda; Shima Ohnishi; Min Tanaka
- Cinematography: Yutaka Aoki
- Edited by: Tetsuichirō Tsuta
- Music by: Keita Kawabata
- Production company: Nikonikofilm
- Release date: 15 February 2014 (Japan)
- Running time: 169 minutes
- Country: Japan
- Language: Japanese

The Tale of Iya (Japanese: 祖谷物語 おくのひと, Hepburn: Iya Monogatari - Oku no Hito) is a 2013 Japanese drama film directed by Tetsuichirō Tsuta, starring Rina Takeda, Shima Ohnishi, and Min Tanaka. Set in the Iya Valley in Tokushima Prefecture, Shikoku, Japan, the film revolves around the lives of an old man, his granddaughter, a newcomer from the big city, and the widely-contested construction of a tunnel in the region.

== Plot ==
An old man steps out of a shrine in the remote mountains of the Iya Valley to find a crashed car with a dead woman inside. On the frozen lake in front of the car, he finds a baby.

Years later, the child, Haruna is now a high school student, and lives in the mountains with the old man, whom she calls Grandpa (Ojii). The village they live in suffers from severe economic decline, with local farmland being threatened by deer and monkeys to an extent that they are actively being hunted, and the elementary school having closed down (though Haruna still attends school with a few other children, including her friend Kotomi, the daughter of a local inn-keeper. Among the villagers, between Haruna's house and the rest of the village, lives Granny (Baa-yan), who keeps realistic dolls (based on Nagoro Doll Village in the Iya Valley).

Kudō, a "drop-out" from Tokyo, arrives in Iya in summer, dissatisfied with life in the big city. He is introduced to the main issue facing the village, which is the construction of a tunnel by a local construction company. Kudō is led to Michael, a foreigner and the leader of a group farm in the village known as "Michael House", where Michael and a group of foreign environmental activists, all of whom oppose the tunnel construction, live. While Michael and his group protest the construction site, Kudō slips away and photographs the abandoned village. As night falls, Kudō is lost in the mountains and stumbles upon Haruna and Grandpa's house. He is taken in, and spends the next day tilling and watering the fields with them. Kudō is inspired by this and determines to start his own farm. Meanwhile, Haruna discusses her future with Kotomi. While Kotomi wants to go to the city, Haruna is concerned for Grandpa and wants to stay with him.

In autumn, Kudō is taken by Haruna's friend Akira, one of the construction crew, to hunt deer. While hunting, Akira says that after the tunnel is completed, he would quit the family business and start a store in town, inviting Kudō on this enterprise. Later, the tunnel opens to some fanfare, but the opening ceremony is disrupted by a car driving through it.

In winter, Granny dies, and Kudō finds that his crops have been ravaged by the snow and animals. Left to scrounging for food, Kudō comes upon Michael, who is leaving the village for good to continue his environmental activism in his home country. Meanwhile, Haruna takes up work at a local recycling plant, and Grandpa's health declines. One day on a hunting trip, Grandpa comes across the scavenging Kudō but collapses, and Kudō carries him back home. As night falls on the village, Granny's dolls come to life, moving and doing work like farming and logging. Haruna wakes up to Grandpa's disappearance, and while desperately searching for him, is picked up by a car with a couple discussing the fraught relationship between mankind and nature. The car drives off road and crashes. Haruna comes to in the now-abandoned car and steps onto the lake she was found on as a baby.

Seven years later, Haruna has become a scientist in Tokyo living with her boyfriend Shuji and working under the genial Dr. Amamiya. The research team wraps up their report on a new invention known as the Bacterian, a substance that, when put into polluted water, rapidly decontaminates it. One night, Haruna dumps a bag of Bacterian into a river and climbs down to the riverbank, where she sleeps alongside a moss-covered humanoid doll. The Bacterian-affected water produces an incandescent green glow, which spreads down the Sumida River and into Tokyo Bay.

Carrying the doll with her, Haruna returns to Iya, which has become redeveloped as a tourist destination, for Kotomi's wedding. The wedding guests pass out from the banquet, and Haruna awakes to a fog-covered Iya and walks to her old home. She comes upon Kudō watering his plants, whom she calls out to as Grandpa.

== Cast ==
- Rina Takeda as Haruna
- Shima Ohnishi as Kudō
- Min Tanaka as Grandpa
- Hitoshi Murakami as Akira
- Sachi Ishimaru as Kotomi
- Christopher Pellegrini as Michael
- Keisuke Yamamoto as Tamura
- Ryū Morioka as Shuji
- Naomi Kawase as Dr. Amamiya
- Takahiro Ono as man in car
- Reika Miwa as woman in car
- Ren Kido as Allan
- Shigeru Kimura as construction boss
- Nishi Tomie as Granny
- Keiko Taoka as Okami

== Production ==
The film was shot on location in the Iya Valley in Tokushima with 35mm film, which was developed by Toei Labo Tech. In an interview at Pan-Asia Film Festival at the Institute of Contemporary Arts, London, director Tetsuichirō Tsuta stated that the inspiration for making the film came from the fact that he was born near the region (in Ikeda, Tokushima). The production of the film took three years. Tsuta's production company, which was founded for the purpose of making the film, received a nine million yen subsidy from the municipality of Miyoshi, in which the Iya valley is located.

Regarding the casting for the high-profile actors Rina Takeda and Min Tanaka, Tsuta stated that they were mostly attracted to the script, adding that he picked Takeda partly due to the fact that she was typecast in action roles and she was "looking at widening her range of acting skills".

== Themes ==
Reviewer Andrew Heskins described the main theme as that of "the demise of a noble way of living with the land that no longer exists", citing the tradition of the village shown in the film. The identification of this theme is corroborated by Mark Schilling of The Japan Times, who calls the film a social realist reflection on "a people whose way of life is disappearing, even as refugees from the city arrive to preserve it." Patrick Frater of Variety has stated that the main themes were "the preciousness of living rooted in the earth, through the interaction between young people from the city and the people who live in the remote wilderness."

When interviewed at the Pan-Asian Film Festival, Tsuta remarked that the 2011 Tōhoku earthquake and tsunami had an impact on the film - he was working on the script when the earthquake happened, but he kept a connection in the scene of the Bacterian purifying the water.

Tsuta makes the connection between the film and Hayao Miyazaki's Princess Mononoke, which Haruna is compared to in the film, saying that it "influenced me a lot". In terms of the intention of the themes of the film, Tsuta stated that "The Japanese audience which saw the film, in majority from urban areas, pitied the 'poor' deers. There are usually fantasy views about the countryside and I hope this film contributed to increasing awareness of the reality. The film does not give any definite answer and leaves things open for our generation to find our own way of living. With a better relationship of the situation of Iya, people could have a better relationship with nature."

== Release ==
The film premiered at Tokyo International Film Festival in October 2013, for which it received a Special Mention for Asian Future Film. The film was screened at Tromsø International Film Festival 2014, at which it received the Aurora Prize, the Pan-Asia Film Festival 2014, at which it received the Best Film Award, the 38th Hong Kong International Film Festival, where it won the Jury Prize, the 12th Green Film Festival in Seoul, where it received a Special Mention, and multiple other film festivals in Europe, North America and Asia. The film released in theaters starting from K's Cinema in Shinjuku on 15 February 2014. It was released early theatrically in Tokushima Prefecture, with a two-week run starting from 11 January 2014 and a re-run from 8 to 21 February 2014.

The film was released in DVD format in 2015.

== Critical reception ==
The film received a five out of five review from Robbie Collin in The Telegraph, who called it "a work of instant and startling brilliance", linking it to works like The Naked Island and The Ballad of Narayama, the general Japanese New Wave, directors such as Shohei Imamura and Kaneto Shindo, and writers like Haruki Murakami. Andrew Heskins of easternKicks gave the film a four out of five star review, calling it "stunningly shot by cinematographer Yutaka Aoki", an "achingly beautiful tribute to a lost Japan", and evocative of Kenji Mizoguchi, Yasujiro Ozu, and The Naked Island. He further describes it as a "visual poem", but criticizes the final act where Haruna is in Tokyo, calling it "a fancy that feels more a part of science fiction". In Mark Schilling's review for The Japan Times, who gave the film four out of five stars, he calls the film "puzzling and haunting", which "soars beyond everyday logic into a world of natural wonder, ruled by gods once strange and familiar, alien to the waking consciousness, but alive in dreams", and praised the cinematography of Yutaka Aoki. He compared the film to One Hundred Years of Solitude and 2001: A Space Odyssey. In response to the comparisons to Naked Island and The Ballad of Narayama, Tsuta responded that "I want to show a positive form of cohabitation between humans and nature. But these films take a negative perspective, in which lives are taken from each others. I definitely kept these directors in mind, but I essentially developed the story out of my own convictions."

The film received the Aurora Prize, the highest prize at the Tromsø International Film Festival.
