= The Spiritual Boxer Part II =

1979 Hong Kong film by Lau Kar-leung

- Film poster
- Traditional Chinese: 茅山殭屍拳
- Hanyu Pinyin: Mao shan jiang shi quan
- Directed by: Lau Kar-leung
- Written by: Ni Kuang
- Produced by: Run Run Shaw
- Starring: Wong Yue
- Cinematography: Arthur Wong Ngok-Tai
- Edited by: Chiang Hsing-Lung; Lee Yim-Hoi
- Music by: Frankie Chan Fan-Kei
- Production company: Shaw Brothers Studio
- Release date: 15 February 1979; (Hong Kong)
- Running time: 97 minutes
- Country: Hong Kong
- Language: Mandarin

The Spiritual Boxer Part II (Chinese: 茅山殭屍拳; pinyin: Mao shan jiang shi quan; lit. 'Maoshan Zombie Fist'), also known as The Shadow Boxing, is a 1979 Mandarin-language Hong Kong martial arts comedy film directed by Lau Kar-leung. It is the thematic sequel to his debut film The Spiritual Boxer (1975). Several of the actors from the first film return, albeit in different roles. The film is notable for being an early jiangshi film based on Chinese folklore, predating both Encounters of the Spooky Kind (1980) and Mr. Vampire (1985).

== Plot ==
During the Qing Dynasty in Xiangxi, Taoist priests working as corpse herders guide the dead back home to their burial place by using Maoshan arts to cast incantations on jiangshi ("stiff corpses") to animate their movement, but due to the onset of rigor mortis, the dead travel by hopping. As such, the priests carry a large amount of various fulu incantations to permit the dead to perform different movements over various types of terrain. Master Chen Wu and his apprentice Fan Zhen Yuan are guiding a group of jiangshi back to their homes for burial. Among the group is also Zhang Jie, who was framed by the robber Zhou Qian Tai and his own boss Bi Ying Heng and sentenced to life in prison and is now a fugitive from the law posing as a jianghi.

Fan Zheng Yuan's friend Ah Fei's father has arranged for her to marry into the Zhu family against her wishes, so she runs away from home and tags along with Fan Zheng Yuan on his journey. When Master Chen Wu is injured in a fight at a local gambling, he asks Fan Zheng Yuan and Ah Fei to continue herding the corpses for him. When they arrive in the town where Mr. Zhou has been performing his crimes, Zhang Jie kills the criminal Xu. When he is found by Zhou Qian Tai, Zhang Jie uses the Eagle Fists art that he has learned from Master Yan to defeat Zhou Qian Tai and the corrupt local officials with the help of Fan Zheng Yuan and Ah Fei.

== Cast ==
- Wong Yue as Fan Zheng Yuan
- Gordon Liu as Zhang Jie
- Cecilia Wong as Ah Fei
- Lau Kar-wing as Master Chen Wu
- Lee Hoi-sang as Zhou Qian Tai
- Norman Tsui as Xu
- Wilson Tong as Xiang
- Wong Ching-ho as Bi Ying Heng
- Shum Lo as Restaurant boss

The director's brother Lau Kar-wing plays Master Chen Wu. Gordon Liu, the godson of the director's father Lau Cham, plays Zhang Jie.

== Release ==
The film was released theatrically in Hong Kong on 15 February 1979.

Some sources list the title as The Spiritual Boxer II.

The film was released on VCD under the title The Shadow Boxing. All remastered editions have borne this title since then.

== Reception ==
Reviewer Will of Silver Emulsion Film Reviews gave the film a rating of 3 out of 4 stars, writing, "As you expect, it explodes in beautifully crafted, precise Lau Kar-Leung style, but the addition of Lau's unique Jiangshi Fist style creates fights that are unlike anything in the Hong Kong industry at the time. If I saw this in 1979, without ever seeing a jiangshi film, I'd have lost my damn mind. The inclusion of Lau's brother Lau Kar-Wing as the master elevates the martial display over the first film, too. His fight in the inn, with Wong Yu jiangshi-ing his way up and down the stairs is a fantastic bit, and it reminds me more of '80s HK choreography than its '70s brethren. It felt like a direct ancestor of the '80s kung fu comedies that cemented my love of HK cinema almost 30 years ago. That being said, the choreography isn't on par with his previous film Heroes of the East, or really any of his main classics, but it's important to remember that an artist must not always top himself. A lateral move in a different direction is more than enough sometimes." The review concludes, "The story and the comedy aren't as sharp as the first Spiritual Boxer (or Sammo and Ricky Lau's films, for that matter), but it remains remarkable entertainment despite this. The action is well beyond what is seen in The Spiritual Boxer, and the two films combine to make an interesting document of Lau Kar-Leung’s progression and evolution as a choreographer in the four years between them. The Spiritual Boxer is the better overall movie, but Part II is more enjoyable and I’m much more inclined to re-watch it. If you haven’t seen either, you definitely should!"

A review by Sean Gilman of The Chinese Cinema reads, "There's a rote thriller plot as an excuse for some fight scenes, which are all very solid. Liu shows off some Eagle Claws and Wang displays the Zombie Fist. It isn't nearly as impressive as the group fights in Dirty Ho, which came out this same year with these same stars, but in every way this is a less ambitious movie than that one. The fights do have the funny twist that Wang can’t ever remember what to do, so he has to have someone call out the moves to him ('Vampire Wakes Up' 'Vampire Greets the Moon' and so on) before he can fight."

The review of the film on sogoodreviews.com reads, "It set the stage for the kung-fu comedy while also blending in elements of spirit boxing but ultimately in itself was an uneven effort. [...] Lau's action directing, while accomplished obviously, never truly ignites and Wang Yu's Vampire Fist technique is more of a neat idea on paper rather than an exciting on screen fighting style. The Shadow Boxing and The Spiritual Boxer should be among your low priorities while exploring Lau Kar Leung's tremendous filmography as director and even he is allowed low-points."

Reviewer Matt Reifschneider of Blood Brothers Films gave the film a rating of 3.5 out of 5 blood drops, writing, "this film ably mixes a variety of styles and genres to tell its story of a 'corpse herder' and his involvement with an underhanded murder conspiracy. While the resulting film doesn't top the charts in any of the various genres it uses, it's hard not to have a fun time with the film in the end." The review concludes, "This is not a film for everyone and many kung fu connoisseurs may not dig into the film as the comedy comes first and foremost in how it proceeds to tell its story. However, the blend of kung fu and comedy works for the story and it remains a massively amusing film with plenty of charm to spare. The Shadow Boxing is not going to be making my list of best Shaw Brothers flicks, but you could easily do worse than this."

The website molodezhnaja.ch gave the film a rating of 2.5 out of 5 stars, writing that the film "mixes frivolously silly mischief with martial arts and 'Horror'. Horror in quotation marks because there are indeed zombies in the film, but it is not spooky for one second. That's how it is with Hong Kong zombies. For one thing they're called vampires, and for another thing they travel by hopping."

Reviewer Niels Matthijs of onderhond.com gave the film a rating of 2.5 out of 5 stars, calling it "worthy but flawed".

== Cultural impact and legacy ==
Many authors have written that the film is the earliest example of a jiangshi film based on Chinese folklore and have noted its impact on future films of the genre.

Author Michael Thomason wrote, "It should be pointed out that, though often cited as the first major jiang shi feature, Shaw Brothers studios preceded Mr. Vampire by six years with Liu Chia Liang's martial arts-horror-comedy The Spiritual Boxer II (1979) (aka: The Shadow Boxing), which not only showcased the jiang shi but also delved into the ritual of corpse-walking and the world of the corpse herders."

In the book Hong Kong Action Cinema (1996), author Bey Logan wrote, "Although Mr Vampire is regarded, justifiably, as the film that set a legion of ghouls hopping across Hong Kong movie screens, credit for first discovering this particular brand of the undead should go to director Lau Kar Leung. His Shaws production, The Spiritual Boxer 2 (1979), predates the Golden Harvest film by six years and stars Wong Yu as a young student of necromancy who must impersonate a missing corpse, under his sifu's orders, so as to placate the man's grieving relatives."

Andrew Heskins of EasternKicks wrote, "Sammo Hung directed himself in the film that took the idea of hopping vampires/deceased from The Shadow Boxing (aka The Spiritual Boxer II) and turned it into a phenomenon with Encounter of the Spooky Kind, and things were never the same."

In the book Draculas, Vampires, and Other Undead Forms: Essays on Gender, Race, and Culture (2009), author Wayne Stein wrote, "With Spiritual Boxer II, Leong adds an important ingredient that Jackie Chan’s success had helped to inaugurate: humor. This time, he throws out the typical traits held by Western vampires, particularly seen in the tradition of Dracula. Leong adopts the Chinese variation on the vampire with the jiangshi, which he resurrects from old folktales. [...] Also, the apprentice to the Taoist master, played by Yu Wong, fights using a curious and comedic style and shows more vigor by fighting like a vampire with stiff joints. Indeed, he is only successful when he becomes enchanted like a jiangshi and fights using his vampire 'stiff-joint' style. More importantly, it is here that Leong's genius for invention lies, which unfortunately received little or no attention from the critics. Nonetheless, Leong's absurdly funny but completely fresh action sequences would later become a fundamental tradition of this future genre of horror. [...] Though the film saw little success at the box office, its contribution to the genre has endured by helping to initiate many of the tropes that future Chinese comedy vampire films eventually adopt. Thus, a new tradition was born, and improvements come when Sammo Hung pushes this new cinematic expression of horror even further."
