= Merry Christmas for You =

Merry Christmas For You

EP by Yuki Uchida
- Released: 22 November 1995
- Recorded: Japan
- Genre: J-pop
- Label: King Records

Yuki Uchida chronology
Mi-Chemin (1995)	Merry Christmas For You (1995)	Ai no Baka (1996)

Merry Christmas for You is Yuki Uchida's Christmas-themed mini-album, released in Japan on 22 November 1995 by King Records (reference: KICS-530). It reached number 19 on the Oricon Albums Chart. It contains six songs (and a message), including two covers of American songs: Mama ga Santa ni Kiss wo Shita, a cover of Jimmy Boyd's "I Saw Mommy Kissing Santa Claus", and Akahana no Tonakai, a cover of Harry Brannon's "Rudolph the Red-Nosed Reindeer".

== Track listing ==
1. Mama ga Santa ni Kiss wo Shita (ママがサンタにキスをした)
2. Kimi ga Kitaru no wo Kitai Shiteitan Dakara (君が来るのを期待していたんだから)
3. T-shirt de Gyutto (Tシャツでギュッと)
4. Akahana no Tonakai (赤鼻のトナカイ)
5. Key (key)
6. Zutto Konya wo Wasurenai (ずっと今夜を忘れない)
7. Message (メッセージ)
