= Nokko =

Japanese singer

- Born: Nobuko Yamada; November 4, 1963 (age 62); Urawa, Saitama, Japan
- Genre: Pop
- Instrument: Vocals
- Years active: 1980–present
- Labels: CBS/SONY RECORDS/FITZBEAT (1983 - 1992); Sony Music Entertainment Japan/Ki/oon Records (1992 - 1997); BMG Japan (1997 - 2001); Gut Records (2003); Go and Nokko (2003-2009); Universal Sigma Label (2010 - present)
- Website: www.nokko.jp

Nokko (born November 4, 1963) is a Japanese singer. She was the lead singer of the popular band Rebecca, which had a string of hits in Japan in the 1980s. Nokko was born in Urawa, Saitama, as Nobuko Yamada (山田 信子, Yamada Nobuko). Under her stage name Nokko, she also had multiple hits in Japan throughout her solo career in the 1990s, and released an English-language album in the US produced and mixed by Goh Hotoda and Francois Kevorkian.

== History ==
In 1990, she married Takehiko Kogure, former group leader of Rebecca. They divorced in 1993. In 2002, she married Goh Hotoda, a sound engineer who has mixed hit singles for artists including Madonna, Janet Jackson, and Hikaru Utada. They now live in Atami, Japan, where on August 1, 2006, the couple welcomed the birth of their daughter, Kano.

== Legacy ==
Nokko's song "Ningyo" (mermaid), which was her fourth solo single on her fourth solo album Colored, was the theme song for the 1994 drama Toki o Kakeru Shōjo starring Yuki Uchida.

== Discography ==
=== Original albums ===
1. Hallelujah (1992) Oricon Albums Chart number 2
2. I Will Catch U. (1993) Oricon number 4
3. Call Me Nightlife (1993)
4. Colored (1994) Oricon number 6
5. Rhyming Cafe (1996) Oricon number 10
6. Veranda no Kishibe (ベランダの岸辺, Veranda Shore) (1998)
7. Viaje (2000)
8. Kiss (2010) Oricon number 20
9. The Nokko Story (2013)
10. True Woman (2018) Oricon number 45

=== Compilation albums ===
1. The Best of Nokko (1997) Oricon number 45
2. Remix Nokko (2000)
3. Nokko's Selection, Nokko's Best (2006)

=== Singles ===
1. Crazy Clouds (1992) Oricon Singles Chart number 4
2. Kiseki no Wedding March (奇跡のウエディングマーチ, Miracle Wedding March) (1992) Oricon number 31
3. I Will Catch U (1993)
4. Vivace (1993)
5. Ningyo (人魚, Mermaid) (1994) Oricon number 2
6. Live ga Hanetara (ライブがはねたら, When the Live Show finished) (1994) Oricon number 7
7. Antenna (アンテナ) (1995)
8. Parade (パレード) (1995) Oricon number 46
9. Tenshi no Love Song (天使のラブソング, Angel's Love Song) (1996) Oricon number 38
10. Natural (1996) Oricon number 27
11. Koi wa Aserazu (恋はあせらず, You Can't Hurry Love) (1997) Oricon number 40
12. Mizu no Naka de Chiisa na Taiyō (水の中の小さな太陽, A Little Sun in the Water) (1997)
13. Haruyuki Usagi (春雪うさぎ, Spring Snow Rabbit) (1998)
14. Wasurenagusa (わすれな草, Forget-me-not) (1998)
15. Friends (フレンズ) (1999) Oricon number 27
16. Hiru no Tsuki (昼の月, Daytime Moon) (1999)
17. Kiss ga Kikoeru/I Love You (KISSが聞こえる, I Can Hear the Kiss) (2000)
