= Rina Takeda =

Japanese actress and karate fighter

- 武田 梨奈
- Born: June 15, 1991 (age 35); Yokohama, Kanagawa, Japan
- Occupations: Actress; singer; karateka
- Years active: 2007–present
- Agent: Sony Music Artists, Inc.

Rina Takeda (武田 梨奈, Takeda Rina; born June 15, 1991) is a Japanese actress, singer and martial artist. She is best known for playing Kei Tsuchiya in High Kick Girl! Takeda holds her black belt in Ryukyu Shōrin-ryū Karate.

== Life and career ==
Takeda was born on June 15, 1991, in Kanagawa Prefecture. She has said that she became interested in karate as a 10-year-old when she saw her father lose in a karate match and decided that she had to avenge his defeat. In June 2008, the 17-year-old Takeda demonstrated her skills at her dojo for Shaolin Girl producer Fuyuhiko Nishi, and he was impressed enough to invite her to audition for the movie High Kick Girl!. Takeda won the starring role as Kei Tsuchiya in the movie which was released in May 2009. In late 2010, Takeda appeared on television in the MBS comedy tokusatsu series The Ancient Dogoo Girl as Doro-chan.

Takeda had her second starring movie role in the February 2011 martial arts action film Karate Girl together with Tobimatsu Hina followed by another action film The Kunoichi: Ninja Girl in March 2011. In 2012, Takeda starred in a different genre of filmmaking with Dead Sushi, a comic horror movie directed by Noboru Iguchi, who had earlier directed her in The Ancient Dogoo Girl. The film had its US premier at the 2012 Austin Fantastic Fest where Takeda won the Best Actress award. Takeda and director Iguchi were both present at the festival. She worked with Iguchi again in the action film Gothic Lolita Battle Bear, released theatrically in Japan in January 2014.

Also in 2014, Takeda co-starred with Rumi Hanai in the science fiction fantasy Danger Dolls directed by Shusuke Kaneko.

== Filmography ==
=== Films ===
- High Kick Girl! (2009), Kei Tsuchiya
- Shoujo Senshiden Sion (2010)
- Karate Girl (2011), Ayaka Kurenai/Ayaka Ikegami
- The Kunoichi: Ninja Girl (2011), Kisaragi
- Dead Sushi (2012), Keiko
- The Tale of Iya (2013), Haruna
- Gothic Lolita Battle Bear (2014), Kill Billy; Nuigurumaa
- Danger Dolls (2014), Rei
- Attack on Titan (2015), Lil
- The Book Peddler (2016), Suzume Akamatsu
- The World's Longest Photograph (2018), Atsuko Takenaka
- Izanagi Kureta (2020), Noriko
- Napoleon and Me (2021), Haruko
- Death in Tokyo (2021), Mina
- Sexual Drive (2021)
- Japanese Style (2022)
- Okashiratsuki (2023), adult Nachi Hiyama
- Muromachi Outsiders (2025)
- By 6 A.M. (2025), Aya Nagase
- Petrichor (2026), Hana Kijima
- The Living Dragon (2026)
- Period (2026)

=== Television ===
- The Ancient Dogoo Girl (2010), Doro-chan
- Wakakozake (2015), Wakako Murasaki
- Devil Lover (2015) (Thai TV Series), Sayaka
- Wakakozake Season 2 (2016), Wakako Murasaki
- Wakakozake Season 3 (2017), Wakako Murasaki
