= Tatsuya Naka =

Japanese karateka (born 1964)

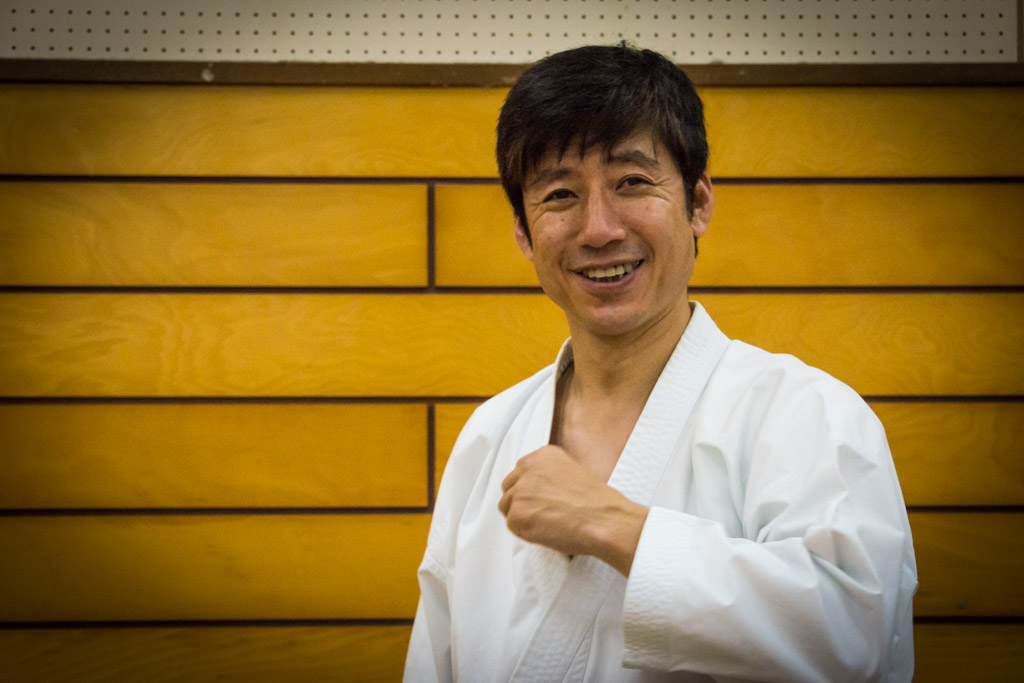
- Naka Tatsuya sensei. Picture taken in his dojo in Myogadani.
- Born: May 29, 1964 (age 62); Tokyo, Japan
- Style: Shotokan Karate
- Rank: 7th dan karate

Tatsuya Naka (中 達也, Naka Tatsuya) (born May 29, 1964 in Tokyo) is a Japanese master of Shotokan karate. He is a full-time instructor of the Japan Karate Association. He holds a 7th dan from JKA. He has also starred in films such as Kuro Obi, High Kick Girl! and Karate Girl.

== Education ==
Naka started karate in his first year of junior high school. He attended Takushoku University.

== Major tournament wins ==
- 35th JKA All Japan Karate Championship (1992)

1st place kumite

- 4th Shoto World Cup Karate Championship Tournament (Tokyo, 1992)

3rd place kumite

- 43rd JKA All Japan Karate Championship (2000)

3rd place kumite
