= The Kunoichi: Ninja Girl =

- Film poster
- Directed by: Seiji Chiba
- Written by: Seiji Chiba
- Produced by: Seiji Chiba
- Starring: Rina Takeda
- Cinematography: Tetsuya Kudō; Ryō Uematsu
- Edited by: Seiji Chiba
- Music by: Kuniyuki Morohashi
- Distributed by: Nippon Shuppan Hanbai, Inc.
- Release date: March 19, 2011 (Japan)
- Running time: 65 minutes
- Country: Japan
- Language: Japanese

The Kunoichi: Ninja Girl (Japanese: 女忍 KUNOICHI) is a 2011 Japanese historical martial arts film directed by Seiji Chiba and starring Rina Takeda.

== Plot ==
Rina Takeda plays the role of a female ninja named Kisaragi who attempts to rescue a group of women being held captive to become toys for men. The film is set sometime in the Sengoku period, during a time of fierce fighting between the Koga and Iga ninja clans.

== Cast ==
- Rina Takeda as Kisaragi
- Mayu Onomura as Hatsu Kagetsu
- Shiho Fujisawa as Inharu
- Kotono as Yayoi
- Mitsuki Koga as Shimotsuki
- Masanori Mimoto as Korigatsu
- Yūichi Satō a Kamina
- Kentarō Shimazu as Sick Man
