= Poison (Rebecca album) =

Studio album by Rebecca (band)
- Released: 28 November 1987

Rebecca (band) chronology
Time (1986)	Poison (1987)	Blond Saurus (1989)

Poison is a 1987 album by the Japanese rock band Rebecca which reached No.1 in the Japanese album charts and received a RIAJ Gold Disc Award for best rock album of the year, as well as winning Grand Prix for artist in all genres in the same year.

== Charts ==
It reached number 1 on the Oricon Albums Chart and spent 27 weeks in that chart. It also reached number 1 on the Music Labo albums chart.

== See also ==
- 1987 in Japanese music
