= Call Me Nightlife =

Studio album by Nokko
- Released: May 20, 1993
- Genres: Progressive house; Deep house
- Label: Epic Records

Nokko chronology
I Will Catch U (1993)	Call Me Nightlife (1993)	Colored (1994)

Call Me Nightlife is the third studio album by Japanese singer Nokko.

== Critical reception ==
Chantay Hawkins, writing for the Fort Worth Star-Telegram rated the album positively, noting that "here's another fun girl, only more bewildering". Billboard called it "a mixed platter of dance styles, old and new", calling several of the singles "club candidates". The album was also reviewed in CDJournal.

== Track listing ==
CD
No.	Title	Writer(s)	Length
1.	"Call Me Nightlife"	Nokko, Peter Wiggs, Bob Stanley	3:50
2.	"I Will Catch U"	Nokko, Towa Tei, Tim Brinkhurst, Ruza Blue	5:35
3.	"Seven Ways to Love"	Nokko, Peter Wiggs, Bob Stanley	4:21
4.	"Oh Yeah"	Nokko, Ruza Blue, Camus Celli, Andres Levin, Kenji Jammer	4:38
5.	"No Return"	Nokko, Ruza Blue, Gota Yashiki	6:49
6.	"Liquid Fire"	Tim Brinkhurst, Nokko, Camus Celli, Andres Levin	5:09
7.	"Don't Hold Back"	Chris Max, Camus Celli, Andres Levin	4:08
8.	"Cosmic Sunshine Baby"	Nokko, Tim Brinkhurst, Mary Lee Kortes	5:02
9.	"Crazy Clouds"	Nokko, J.B. Allright, Tim Brinkhurst, Gota Yashiki	6:19
10.	"Vanity"	Nokko, Mary Lee Kortes, Tim Brinkhurst, Leigh Gorman	4:01

== Charts ==
Chart performance for Call Me Nightlife
Chart (1993)	Peak position
Japanese Albums (Oricon)	27
