= Tomoko Ikuta =

Japanese actress (born 1967)

- 生田 智子
- Born: February 13, 1967 (age 59); Itabashi, Tokyo, Japan
- Other name: Tomoko Nakayama
- Occupation: Actress
- Years active: 1983–present
- Agent: Toho Entertainment
- Height: 1.65 m (5 ft 5 in) (2008)
- Spouse: Masashi Nakayama (m. 1996)

Tomoko Nakayama (中山 智子, Nakayama Tomoko; born February 13, 1967), better known as Tomoko Ikuta (生田 智子, Ikuta Tomoko), is a Japanese actress. Her skills are dancing and horseback riding. She is a regular model for Mart. Her husband is footballer Masashi Nakayama.

== Biography ==
Ikuta was born in Itabashi, Tokyo, Japan. After starring in some work as a child actress, in 1983, she debuted in the film, Vienna Story: Gemini • Y and S (Vienna Monogatari Gemini Y to S). She graduated from Yamazaki Gakuen Fujimi High School and Japan Women's College of Physical Education. In 1996, Ikuta married Júbilo Iwata professional footballer Masashi Nakayama.

In 2004, they had their first child. Ikuta dubbed in the South Korean drama, Dae Jang Geum. She is also a mother tarento and worked as a model.

In 2011, with her husband, they won 4th Platinum Couple Awards.

== Filmography ==
=== TV series ===
Year	Title	Role	Network	Notes
1978	Princess Comet		TBS	Episode 32
1980	Pīman Hakusho	Student	Fuji TV	Episode 9
1982	The Hangman II		ABC	Episode 6
1984	Oregon Kara Ai		Fuji TV	
1985	Miotsukushi	Masumi Yoshitake	NHK	
1985	Hissatsu Shigoto Hito V	Osode	ABC	Episode 10
1985	Jirareta Mariko	Miyako Maeda	TBS	
1987	Pro Golfer Reiko	Ayako Marumoto	Fuji TV	
1988	I Wanna Hold Your Hand	Tomoka Yoshizawa	Fuji TV	
1988	Abarenbō Shogun III	Okayo	TV Asahi	Episode 35
1988	OL Sannintabi 5 Nile Yukemuri Satsujin	Mayumi Nishino	Fuji TV, Kyodo TV	
1989	Kyōshi Binbin Monogatari II	Reiko Kinoshita	Fuji TV	
1989	Sasurai Keiji Ryojō-hen II		TV Asahi	Episode 1
1989	Sanbiki ga Kiru!		TV Asahi	Episode 9
1989	Ai Shi Atteru Kai!		Fuji TV	Episode 9
1989	Lucky! Tenshi, to e Iku	Sawamura	Fuji TV	
1990	Kimyōna Dekigoto	Yoko Katayama	Fuji TV	Lead role
1990	The Deka	Kyoko Tachibana	TV Asahi	Episode 3
1990	Nihonichi no Kattobi Otoko		Fuji TV	Episode 5
1990	Mikeneko Homes no Kanshō Ryokō	Yukiko	TV Asahi	
1990	Hagurekeiji Junjō-ha		TV Asahi	Episode 25
1991	Aitai Toki ni Anata wa Inai…	Hiroko Nakamura	Fuji TV	
1991	Kamakura Renai Iinkai		TBS	
1992	Tokugawa Buraichō		TV Tokyo	Episode 22
1992	Nobunaga King of Zipangu	Yui	NHK	
1992	Sono toki Heartwa Nusumareta	Inaba-sensei	Fuji TV	
1993	Abarenbō Shogun V	Osamu Masa	TV Asahi	Episode 11
1993	Nakitai Yoru mo Aru		MBS	Episode 11
1993	Mito Kōmon	Kaori	TBS	Episode 32
1994	Hosou de Hanjō-ki	Kimie	Fuji TV	
2011	Boku to Star no 99 Nichi	Yukiko Namiki	Fuji TV	
2012	Kōkō Nyūshi	Masako Shibata	Fuji TV	
2012	Monsters	Mitsuko Okawara	TBS	Episode 5
2013	Doctors: Saikyō no Meii	Saito University Hospital operating room nurse	TV Asahi	
2015	Zeimu Chōsakan Taro Madogiwa no Jiken-bo 29	Yuko Muto	TBS	
2017	Hiyokko	Yasue Fukuda	NHK	Asadora

=== Films ===
Year	Title	Role	Notes	Ref.
1982	PC Wars Isami	Chiyo		
1983	Vienna Story: Gemini • Y and S	Yumi Irie		
1989	Kimi wa Boku o Suki ni Naru			
1992	Angel Boku no Uta wa Kimi no Uta	Akiko Tsukanohara		
2008	Kagehinata ni Saku	Shinya's mother		
2013	Kenchō Omotenashi-ka			
2018	Kasane			
2019	You Shine in the Moonlit Night			
2020	Apparel Designer			
2022	BL Metamorphosis	Hanae		
