= Min Tanaka =

Japanese dancer and actor (born 1945)

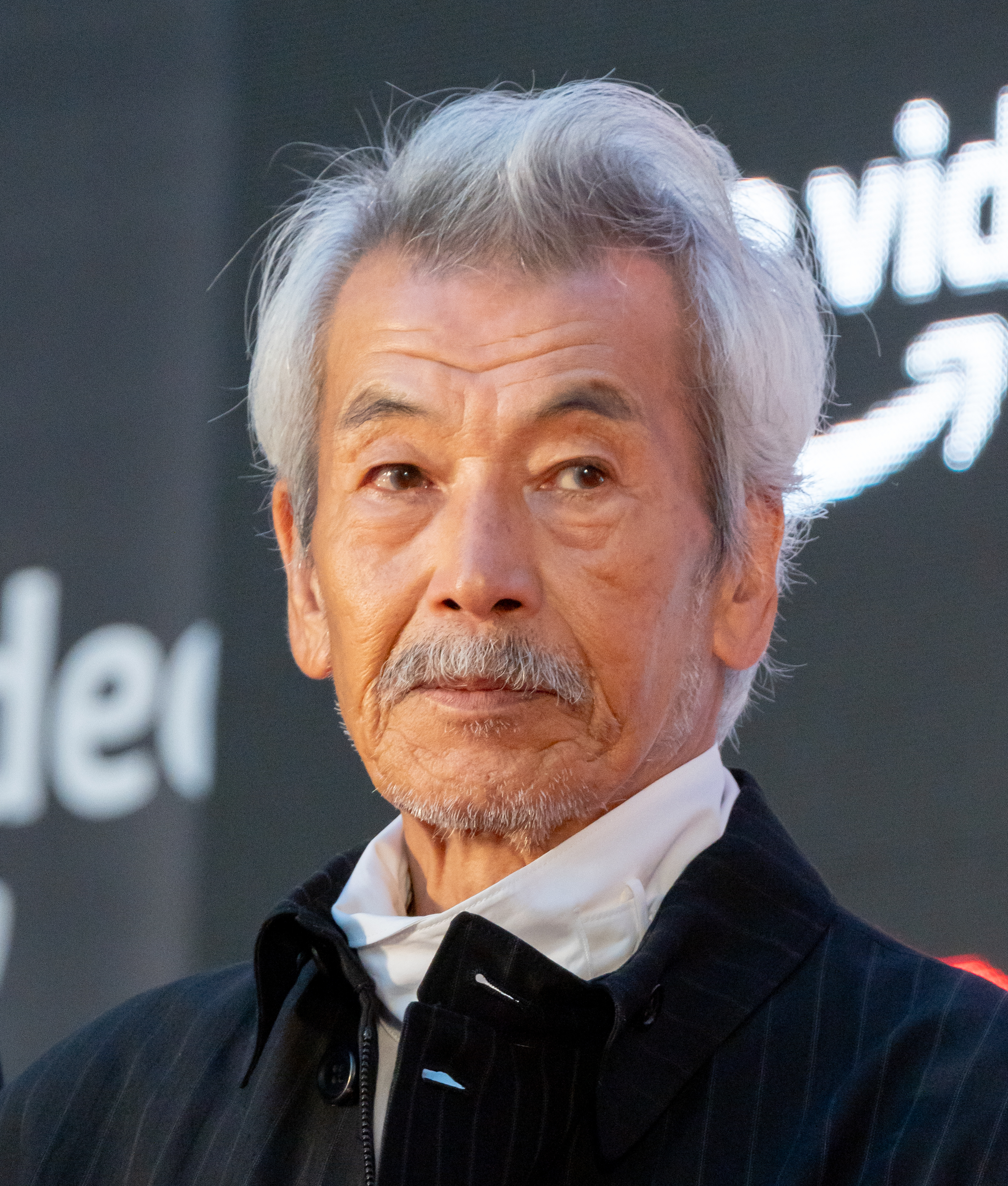
- Tanaka in 2023
- Born: March 10, 1945 (age 81); Tokyo, Japan
- Occupations: Dancer, actor
- Years active: 1966–present

Min Tanaka (田中泯, Tanaka Min; born March 10, 1945) is a Japanese dancer and actor.

== Biography ==
Tanaka was born on March 10, 1945 in Nakano, Tokyo, during the Tokyo Great Air Raid, one of the deadliest air raids of World War II.

Tanaka was trained in ballet and modern dance, but in 1974, turned his back on these forms. He began his solo career with a series of nearly-naked primarily outdoor improvisational dances that took place throughout Japan, often dancing up to five times a day. For a time in the 1980s, he was associated with Hijikata Tatsumi and butoh, a loose genre of Japanese dance, but has since broken from that framework as well, and no longer uses that term to describe his dances.

From 1986 to 2010, Tanaka hosted dance workshops based in Body Weather, a movement ideology which "conceives of the body as a force of nature: omni-centered, anti-hierarchic, and acutely sensitive to external stimuli." In 1985, Tanaka and his colleagues founded Body Weather Farm, located four hours west of Tokyo, where he taught summer sessions lasting four to five weeks in Japanese and English. Much of the training workshop students received was centered on the labor of workaday tasks, primarily in agriculture. Tanaka taught that performing such tasks in their environments and with their accompanying physical stimulations functioned as a dance student's teacher itself, overturning the tradition of the environment taking on a subordinate role to the dance student's technique. He received the Chevalier of l'ordre des Arts et des Lettres from the French government in 1989 or 1990.

He continues to experiment with new ways to use the body, including drawing inspiration from farming. Starting in 2002, he began to appear in movies and on television. He won the award for best supporting actor at the 26th Japan Academy Film Prize for The Twilight Samurai. In 2026, he played the role of Professor Kanji Murakami in Godzilla Minus Zero.

== Filmography ==
=== Films ===
Year	Title	Role	Notes	Ref.
2002	The Twilight Samurai			
2004	The Hidden Blade			
2005	House of Himiko			
2006	Tekkonkinkreet	Suzuki a.k.a. Rat (voice)		
2009	Heaven's Door	Henmi		
2009	Map of the Sounds of Tokyo		Spanish film	
2011	Rebirth	Taki		
2012	Gaiji Keisatsu			
2013	Return			
2013	The Eternal Zero	Kageura		
2013	47 Ronin	Lord Asano	American film	
2013	The Tale of Iya	Grandpa		
2014	Rurouni Kenshin: Kyoto Inferno	Okina		
2014	Rurouni Kenshin: The Legend Ends	Okina		
2017	Blade of the Immortal	Mugai-ryū		
2017	Destiny: The Tale of Kamakura	Binbōgami		
2018	The Scythian Lamb	Katsumi Ōno		
2018	Vision	Minamoto		
2018	The Outsider	Akihiro	American film	
2018	The House Where The Mermaid Sleeps			
2018	Modest Heroes	Blind man (voice)		
2018	Ninomiya Kinjirō			
2019	The Great War of Archimedes	Tadamichi Hirayama		
2019	Svaha: The Sixth Finger	Nechung Tenpa	South Korean film	
2019	Children of the Sea	Jim (voice)		
2020	The Memory Eraser	Shin'ichi Sugawara		
2021	Hokusai	Old Hokusai	Lead role	
2021	A Morning of Farewell			
2022	The Unnameable Dance	Himself	Documentary	
2022	The Pass: Last Days of the Samurai	Kawai Daiemon		
2022	Yokaipedia	Jizuri (voice)		
2022	Amnesiac Love		Special appearance	
2023	Father of the Milky Way Railroad	Kisuke Miyazawa		
2023	Mom, Is That You?!			
2023	Perfect Days	Homeless man	Japanese-German film	
2024	Who Were We?			
2024	The Real You	Wakamatsu		
2025	Kokuho	Onogawa Mangiku		
2026	Black Ox	Zen priest		
2026	Sheep in the Box	Akio Yamagata		
2026	Godzilla Minus Zero	Kanji Murakami		

=== Television ===
Year	Title	Role	Notes	Ref.
2010	Ryōmaden	Yoshida Tōyō	Taiga drama	
2014–16	Gou Gou, The Cat		2 seasons	
2015	Mare		Asadora	
2015	To Give a Dream			
2016	Kyoto Love Story	Sei-san		
2017	A Life: A Love	Isshin Okita		
2019	Nodoka no Niwa	Ikuo Sakaki		
2021	The Supporting Actors 3	Himself		
2022	The 13 Lords of the Shogun	Fujiwara no Hidehira	Taiga drama	
2022	Teen Regime	Shigeo Hosaka	Miniseries	
2024	House of the Owl	Ryutaro Ogami	Lead role	
2025	The 19th Medical Chart	Noboru Akaike		

== Awards and honours ==
- 26th Japan Academy Film Prize: Best Supporting Actor (2003)
- Person of Cultural Merit (2025)
- 38th Nikkan Sports Film Awards: Best Supporting Actor (2025)
- 47th Yokohama Film Festival: Best Supporting Actor (2026)
