= Gothic Lolita Battle Bear =

- Blu-ray cover
- Directed by: Noboru Iguchi
- Screenplay by: Jun Tsugita
- Based on: Sewing Man Nuguruma by Kenji Ohtsuki
- Produced by: Takyuki Matsuno; Junnosuke Miyamoto
- Starring: Shoko Nakagawa; Rina Takeda
- Cinematography: Satoshi Murakawa
- Edited by: Yosuke Yafune
- Music by: Hirohiko Fukuda
- Production company: Ganges
- Distributed by: King Records; T-Joy
- Release dates: September 20, 2013 (/slash Film Festival); January 25, 2014 (Japan)
- Running time: 99 minutes
- Country: Japan
- Language: Japanese

Gothic Lolita Battle Bear (Japanese: ヌイグルマーZ, Hepburn: Nuigurumaa Z; also Nuigulumar Z) is a 2013 Japanese tokusatsu film directed by Noboru Iguchi and starring Shoko Nakagawa.

== Cast ==
- Shoko Nakagawa as Yumeko Aikawa, a gothic lolita fashionista
- Rina Takeda as Kill Billy, Takeshi's sidekick; and Nuiguruma, Yumeko's superhero alter-ego
- Sadao Abe as voice of Busuke, Yumeko's pink teddy bear
- Mao Ichimichi as Kyoko, Yumeko's niece
- Hiroshi Neko as Takeshi, the villain who plans to take over the world with 109 zombies
- Koto Takagi
- Honoka Kitahara
- Jiji Boo
- Takumi Saito
- Kami Hiraiwa
- Koichi Yamadera as Deparuza Charlie, a black teddy bear.

== Production ==
The film is based on a book by Kenji Ohtsuki, member of the rock bands Kinniku Shōjo Tai and Tokusatsu.

== Release ==
The film had its American debut at the 15th Hawaii International Film Festival on October 18, 2013.
