= Karate Girl =

2011 film by Yoshikatsu Kimura

- Film poster
- Directed by: Yoshikatsu Kimura
- Written by: Fuyuhiko Nishi
- Produced by: Hideyuki Fukuhara; Hitoshi Kurauchi; Fuyuhiko Nishi; Katsuhiro Ogawa; Takehiko Shimazu; Yusuke Wakabayashi; Tomomi Yoshimura
- Starring: Rina Takeda
- Cinematography: Daisuke Sōma
- Edited by: Masaki Murakami
- Music by: Gōro Yasukawa
- Distributed by: Toei Company
- Release date: February 5, 2011 (Japan)
- Running time: 92 minutes
- Country: Japan
- Language: Japanese

Karate Girl (Japanese: KG カラテガール) is a 2011 Japanese martial arts film directed by Yoshikatsu Kimura starring Rina Takeda.

== Plot ==
Rina Takeda and Hina Tobimatsu co-star as sisters Ayaka and Natsuki Kurenai, the youngest descendants of a legendary Okinawan karate master named Shoujirou Kurenai. As children, they live a happy life with their father (Tatsuya Naka) who encourages them to practice karate. However, one day a mysterious group invades his dojo - killing his father, kidnapping Natsuki and stealing the black belt that was worn on his family for more than 200 years. Several years later, Ayaka is living the humble life as an ordinary high school student in Yokohama. One day, when Ayaka was working, a group of assailants were stealing a woman's purse. Ayaka uses her karate skills to stop them from making her a hero to the public. Ayaka's heroism was filmed causing the evil organization to notice Ayaka's fighting skills. Natsuki, on the other hand, was trained as a killing machine by the mysterious group that kidnapped her all those years ago. Soon, Natsuki and the group begin to target Ayaka. Out of love for her sister and with her father's teachings still in her heart, Ayaka decides to do whatever it takes to get Natsuki and her family's black belt back from the clutches of the mysterious group.

== Cast ==
- Rina Takeda as Ayaka Kurenai / Ayaka Ikegami
- Hina Tobimatsu as Natsuki Kurenai / Sakura, her younger sister
- Tatsuya Naka as Tatsuya Kurenai, their father
- Kazutoshi Yokoyama as Ryuji Muto
- Richard William Heselton as Keith
- Noriko Iriyama as Miki Ikegami, Ayaka's adoptive mother
- Saori Takizawa as Reiko Ōhashi
- Keisuke Horibe as Amane Tagawa.
