= Ghost Soup =

- DVD cover
- Directed by: Shunji Iwai
- Written by: Shunji Iwai
- Produced by: Fuji TV
- Starring: Hiroyuki Watari; Ranran Suzuki; Dave Spector
- Edited by: Shunji Iwai
- Music by: Hironori Doi
- Distributed by: Fuji TV
- Release date: December 21, 1992 (Japan)
- Running time: 58 minutes
- Country: Japan
- Language: Japanese

Ghost Soup (Japanese: ゴーストスープ) is a 1992 Japanese TV drama produced for Fuji TV as part of the food-themed drama series, La Cuisine by Shunji Iwai.

== Plot ==
It's Christmas Eve in Tokyo as Ichiro is moving into his new apartment one month ahead of schedule. As he is getting settled in, two strangers enter the apartment and are surprised to find him there. They begin complaining that he is upsetting their plans for a Christmas party to be thrown in the apartment that night before attempting to kick him out.
