= Present (Yuki Uchida album) =

Compilation album by Yuki Uchida
- Released: December 3, 1997
- Recorded: Japan
- Genre: J-pop
- Label: King Records

Yuki Uchida chronology
nakitakunalu (1996)	Present (1997)	Uchida Yuki Perfect Best

Present is Yuki Uchida's sixth album (including one EP) and first compilation album, which includes eight "A-side" and one "B side" songs from her previous singles, one song from her previous album, and two unreleased tracks. It was released in Japan on December 3, 1997, by King Records (reference: KICS-630). It reached number 33 on the Oricon Albums Chart.

== Track listing ==
1. Tenca wo Torou! -Uchida no Yabou- (TENCAを取ろう~内田の野望)
2. Ashita wa Ashita no Kaze ga Fuku (明日は明日の風が吹く)
3. Only You
4. Baby's Growing Up
5. Shiawase ni Naritai (幸せになりたい)
6. Ever & Ever (EVER & EVER)
7. Present (プレゼント) (from Nakitakunalu album)
8. "Aishiteru" (「アイシテル」)
9. Da.i.su.ki.
10. Uchida no Rock'n'Roll (from Da.i.su.ki. single)
11. Bijin mo Busu mo (美人もブスも) (unreleased track)
12. Honto no Koto (ホントノコト) (unreleased track)
