= Rebecca (band) =

Japanese pop rock band

- Origin: Japan
- Genres: Rock, pop rock, new wave
- Years active: 1982-1991, 1995, 1999-2002, 2015-2019, 2022-present
- Labels: Sony, Fitzbeat
- Past members: Nokko

Rebecca (レベッカ, Rebekka) is a Japanese rock band that had a great deal of success throughout the 1980s, fronted by singer Nokko. The band's 1985 album Rebecca IV ~maybe tomorrow~ sold one million copies in the year, surpassing Yuming, the first truly commercially successful rock album in Japan. The band's song Friends reached number 3 on the Japanese singles chart in 1986 according to Billboard. They won the Japan Gold Disc Award for Japanese artists in 1988. Rebecca disbanded in 1991.

== Discography ==
=== Studio albums ===
- Voice Print (1984)
- Nothing To Lose (1984)
- Wild & Honey (1985)
- Rebecca IV ~maybe tomorrow~ (1985) Oricon LP chart number 1; Music Labo album chart number 1
- Time (1986) Music Labo album chart number 1
- Poison (1987)
- Blond Saurus (1989) Oricon number 1

=== Live albums ===
- Live Selection 1 (1992) Oricon number 24
- Live Selection 2 (1992) Oricon number 25
- Rebecca Live '85 ~Maybe Tomorrow Tour~ (2013)

=== Remix albums ===
- Remix Rebecca (1987) Cash Box LP chart number 1
- Olive (1988) Oricon number 1

=== Singles ===
- Friends (1985) Oricon number 3
- Raspberry Dream (1986) Oricon number 4
- Lonely Butterfly (1986) Oricon number 6
- Monotone Boy (1987) Oricon number 3
- Nervous but Glamorous (1987) Oricon number 7
- Moon (1988) Oricon number 20
- One More Kiss (1988) Oricon number 5
- Vanity Angel (1989) Oricon number 12
- Super Girl (Super Remix) (1989)
- Little Rock (1989) Oricon number 4
- Kamisama To Nakanaori (Japanese: 神様と仲なおり) (2000) Oricon number 20
- Koini Ochitara (Japanese: 恋に堕ちたら) (2017) Oricon number 11. Sara Minami starred in the music video.

=== 12 inch singles ===
- Bottom Line (1985) Oricon number 6
- Motor Drive (1986) Oricon number 3
- Cheap Hippies (1987) Oricon number 12
