= Ranran Suzuki =

Japanese actress (born 1975)

- Born: August 4, 1975 (age 50); Tokyo, Japan
- Occupation: Actress

Ranran Suzuki (鈴木 蘭々, Suzuki Ranran; real name: 鈴木智子 Suzuki Tomoko, born August 1975) is a Japanese actress. She was an idol and singer in the 1990s.

== Career ==
She began her career as an idol in the early 1990s, in commercials, then got her first role in a drama in 1992. In 1994, she performed in rabbit-cosplay in duet with future J-pop star Namie Amuro in the children TV show Ponkikies, singing the show's theme song as "Sister Rabbits". She released a few singles and two albums in 1996. Jonathan Crow of AllRovi wrote that she "almost walks away with the film in her hilarious cameo as Sanae Oikawa" in his review for the film Love Letter.

== Filmography ==
=== Films ===
- Love Letter (1995)
- Overdrive (2004)
- Yajikita Dochu Teresuko (2007)
- I Just Didn't Do It (2007)

=== Television ===
- Ghost Soup (1992)
- Shonan Joshiryo Monogatari (1993)
- Toki o Kakeru Shojo (1994)
- Aishiteiru to Ittekure (1995)
- Okami Sandai Onna no Tatakai (1995)
- 100 Oku no Otoko (1995)
- Wild de Iko (1997)
- San Shimai Tantei Dan (1998)
- Toshishita no Otoko (2003)
- Kiraware Matsuko no Issho (2006)
- Dondo Bare (2007)
- Osen (2008)

=== Dubbing ===
- Quest for Camelot (1998) - Kayley

== Discography ==
=== Albums ===
- Bottomless Witch (1996)
- One and Only (1996)

=== Singles ===
- "Magic of Love" (1994)
- "Nakanaizoe" (1995)
- "Issun Momo Kintarou" (1995) with Namie Amuro as Sister Rabbits
- "Nande, Nande, Nande?" (1996)
- "Kiss" (1996)
- "Magic" (1996)
- "... of You" (1996)
- "Who Who Who" (1997)
- "Shoobie Doobie Doing!" (1997)
- "Kimi to Boku" (1998)
- "Be with You" (2001)

=== Theatre ===
- The Wizard of Oz on Ice - Dorothy Gale (Early 2000)
- Urinetown - Hope Cladwell (2004)
- Jekyll & Hyde - Emma Carew (2005–2007)
- Pippin - Catherine (2007)
- Big Fish - Jenny Hill (2017)

=== VHS ===
- Visualand (1997)

== Commercials ==
Ranran has appeared in commercials for several clients:

- Shiseido (cosmetics)
- Lawson (convenience stores)
- Takeda (health drinks)
- Chōya Umeshu (umeshu)
- Morinaga & Company (candy)
- Maruchan (instant noodles)
- Pilot (pens)
- Suzuki (motor scooter)
