= The Spiritual Boxer =

1975 Hong Kong film by Lau Kar-leung

- Theatrical release poster
- Traditional Chinese: 神打
- Hanyu Pinyin: Shén dǎ
- Directed by: Lau Kar-leung
- Written by: Ni Kuang
- Produced by: Runme Shaw
- Starring: Wong Yue
- Cinematography: Kuang Han Lu
- Edited by: Huang Chih-Hsiung
- Music by: Frankie Chan Fan-Kei
- Production company: Shaw Brothers
- Distributed by: Cinema City & Films Co.
- Release date: 28 November 1975; (Hong Kong)
- Running time: 103 minutes
- Country: Hong Kong
- Language: Mandarin

The Spiritual Boxer (Chinese: 神打; pinyin: Shen da; lit. 'Divine Strike') is a 1975 Mandarin-language Hong Kong martial arts comedy film directed by Lau Kar-leung in his directorial debut.

== Plot ==
At the end of the Qing Dynasty, fighters known as spiritual boxers are believed to be able to gain martial arts powers such as invincibility from Taoist blessings. When his master Chi Keung is too drunk to perform a demonstration for some customers, conman Hsiao Chien is forced to perform the demonstration himself, pretending to be possessed by various gods and performing their martial arts styles. Though some see through his act at first, when he pretends to be a god and jumps into a canal it coincidentally suddenly begins raining, causing many to believe that he is truly a spiritual boxer with magic powers.

Hsiao Chien helps poor locals when they are preyed upon by local gangs and gains help in his actions from orphan girl Jin Lian, whom he teaches the tricks of his trade. She does not approve of using tricks to earn money, but helps him with other schemes such as helping Ah Jin get approval to marry Peony. When loanshark Liu Deruei takes advantage of the poor locals with predatory loans, Hsiao Chen confronts him and scares him using his tricks. Hsiao Chien teaches the locals kung fu and they defeat Liu Deruei's gang in a confrontation. Liu Deruei calls in his friends, wanted criminals Shum and Jiu, and Shum shows Liu Deruei how Hsiao Chien's tricks were performed. Unafraid of Hsiao Chien's tricks, Liu Deruei brings Shum and Jiu to fight Hsiao Chien. They overpower him and chase him outside of town, where Master Chi Keung is drinking. Master Chi Keung guides Hsiao Chien in the right kung fu techniques to use against Shum and Jiu, helping him withstand them. Ah Jin brings the police, who arrest Shum and Jiu for robbery.

== Cast ==
- Wong Yue as Hsiao Chien
- Lin Chen-chi as Jin Lian
- Chiang Yang as Master Chi Keung
- Shih Chung-tien as Liu Deruei
- Fung Hak-on as Liu Deruei's mein thug
- Lee Hoi-sang as Shum
- Ng Hong-sang as Jiu
- Ngaai Fei as Ah Jin
- Chan Shen as Master Lin
- Teresa Ha as Lin's wife
- Chan Mei-hua as Peony
- Wong Ching-ho as Mr. Chen
- Keung Hon as Liu Yung
- Lee Sau-kei as Innkeeper
- Shum Lo as Bun/noodle stall boss
- Tin Ching as Eunuch Li Lien Ying
- Chen Kuan-tai as Boxer's shaman
- Ti Lung as Boxer's shaman
- Wilson Tong as Boxer's shaman
- Cheung Chok-chow as Lin's servant
- Cheung Sek-aau as Lin's servant
- Lau Kar-yung as Bun/noodle stall assistant
- To Wing-leung as Inn waiter
- Tung Choi-bo as Policeman
- Chin Chun as Villager losing eggs to Ruei's thug
- Ho Kei-cheong as Ruei's thug in egg scene
- Chan Dik-hak as Ruei's thug/Riflesman
- Ho Bo-Sing as Ruei's thug/Chens clan/Lin's servant
- Danny Chow as Chens clan/Yi Wo boxer
- Wong Kung-miu as Clothes hawker
- Lau Kar-wing as Chien's disciple

The director's brother Lau Kar-wing plays a small role as one of Chien's disciples, and the director's nephew (son of his older sister) Lau Kar-Yung plays a bun/noodle stall assistant.

== Release ==
The film was released theatrically in Hong Kong on 28 November 1975.

The film has also been released under the title Fists from the Spirit World. A dubbed version was released in the United States under the title Naked Fists of Terror.

The film was followed by a thematic sequel, The Spiritual Boxer Part II (1979), also known as The Shadow Boxing.

== Reception ==
Reviewer David Brook of blueprintreview.co.uk called the film "an episodic affair that feels like a series of skits more than a fleshed out story" yet "an important and groundbreaking title in the genre and deserves better recognition." The review concludes, "Overall then, being one of the earliest successful true fusions of kung-fu and comedy, it's an important and influential entry into the martial arts movie genre. Some later films may have improved the formula and Chia-Liang Liu bettered this himself in his illustrious career which followed. However, this still holds its own. Fun and action-packed from start to finish, it’s well worth a watch."

A review by Sean Gilman of The Chinese Cinema reads, "One can see here the imperative of the 36th Chamber: to go out into the world and do good for the people as the highest spiritual virtue, not bells and whistles, temples and sacraments, mythology and dogma. Lau may poke fun and priests and religions, but it is the prodding of a true believer."

The review of the film on sogoodreviews.com reads, "Lau's action is rather sparse and there in sporadic bursts but before the finale, enough glimpses of entertaining and intricate martial arts are on display to breathe life into the picture. The finale, while not up to the levels of subsequent works of Lau's, is still a joy to watch for his expert skill as a choreographer."

Reviewer Scott Clark of starburstmagazine.com wrote, "A film like The Spiritual Boxer, though not as instantly recognisable as Five Deadly Venoms or Eight Diagram Pole Fighter, is still well worth checking out. It’s a film about faith and the construction of legends, but also how those legends factor into modern everyday life. On a wider level, it's a film about misdirection and action cinema itself: Liang appears to be starting out his career with a reality check for the audience. Strip away the myth or the filmmaking, and what you're left with is a collection of incredibly focused martial artists working to build a light-hearted fantasy. And what a charming fantasy."

Reviewer Will of Silver Emulsion Film Reviews gave the film a rating of 3.5 out of 4 stars, writing, "The Spiritual Boxer is a wonderful film to begin a directorial career with, and it immediately sets Lau Kar-Leung apart from other Shaw directors. His eye reveals new angles on old sets, as well as a penchant for a shallow depth of field that gives the film a unique look among the Shaw catalog. The story offers a blend of martial arts and comedy previously unseen in the genre, and it introduces ghost and spiritual elements that would soon permeate the Hong Kong industry throughout the late '70s and '80s."

Reviewer David Chew of Asian Movie Pulse wrote, "Seldom seen in kung fu films before, Lau's directorial debut is a great combination of comedy and wonderfully choreographed kung fu action, starring an equally likable though wacky lead. The clever inclusion of spiritual and ghost elements into the mix would later influence other films to follow. Even though there is a lack of the typical spectacular final showdown or any training sequence, the result is still very entertaining and the comedy is never over the top and well written. Also, Lau is definitely more interested in telling a story with passion and heart and with good characters instead of just all out mindless action."

Reviewer Ben Johnson of kungfumovieguide.com gave the film a rating of 3 out of 5 stars, writing, "This was a bold and unexpected debut from Lau, and even with his first film, he is displaying the kind of intellect, invention and vision which would make him one of the best kung fu filmmakers of all time."

The website molodezhnaja.ch gave the film a rating of 2.5 out of 5 stars, writing, "'The Spiritual Boxer' is indeed a pioneer when it comes to mixing kung-fu with humor, but the martial arts mischief is not really successful: The story is extremely thin, the production is uncoordinated apart from the fights, and the humor is not exactly the best. [...] What saves this film - and this should be no surprise - are the slugfests. They are really cool and Liu showed that he really likes to try out the various styles that the martial arts world has to offer."

Reviewer Daniel Auty of thespinningimage.co.uk gave the film a rating of 6 out of 10 stars, writing, "Hardcore kung fu fans may be disappointed by the lack of action – there are a few fight scenes but these tend to be brief and largely played for laughs. But there's sense of gentle fun about it all – and not a single death in the entire film – while the production values and cinematography are well up to the high standard set by the studio during this period."
