= Alien vs Ninja =

Alien vs. Ninja
- American theatrical release poster
- Directed by: Seiji Chiba
- Written by: Seiji Chiba
- Produced by: Seiji Chiba; Yoshinori Chiba
- Starring: Shuuji Kashiwabara; Mika Hijii; Ben Hiura
- Cinematography: Tetsuya Kudô
- Edited by: Seiji Chiba
- Production company: Nikkatsu (as Sushi Typhoon)
- Distributed by: Nikkatsu; 8 Films
- Release date: July 3, 2010 (NYAFF)
- Running time: 83 minutes
- Country: Japan
- Language: Japanese
- Budget: $600,000

Alien vs Ninja (Japanese: エイリアンVSニンジャ), also known as AvN, is a 2010 Japanese martial arts science-fiction comedy film written and directed by Seiji Chiba.

Produced by Nikkatsu studios, the film was slated for release in July 2010. The US DVD and Blu-ray were released February 22, 2011.

== Plot ==
A band of ninja warriors, led by an Iga ninja named Yamata and his comrades Jinnai and Nezumi, are assigned to investigate the crash of a mysterious object from the sky. Upon arriving at the crash site, they discover the remains of other ninjas that have been brutally torn apart. Shortly after joining forces with another band of ninjas led by the kunoichi Rin, they encounter a boy whose village was massacred by an unknown assailant. Before they can get any further explanation from him, the ninjas are attacked by the assailants, who reveal themselves to be aliens from another planet. After a grueling battle that takes the lives of several ninjas, Yamata, Rin and Jinnai kill three of the aliens, but one of them retreats and takes Jinnai with it. A cowering Nezumi rushes back to his home village, only to see the villagers massacred by the aliens. He runs for his life, but is cornered by the alien, which swiftly decapitates him as his head lands on a temple post for a crow to feed on.

Jinnai wakes up at an abandoned temple, hanging upside down along with corpses of other ninjas. He discovers an organism lurking within his throat, but before he can react, it takes over his body. The boy leads Yamata and Rin to the temple, only to be surrounded by Jinnai and the dead ninjas, who are being manipulated by small organisms secreted from the alien's nostrils. The possessed Jinnai and the dead ninjas utter English expletives before Yamata takes one down to shut them up. After discovering a pair of eyes peeking from a dead ninja's mouth, Yamata tells Rin to target the dead ninjas' throats. Rin dispatches the ninjas by ejecting the organisms from their throats while Yamata shoves his hand through Jinnai's mouth to extract the symbiote controlling him. After a long struggle, Yamata frees Jinnai from the alien's control. Yamata then squares off against the last alien in a cave. Overpowered by Yamata's skills, the alien sprouts wings to fly out of the scene, but Yamata grabs its leg before taking off. The alien attempts to shake Yamata off its back, but Yamata places a bomb on it and jumps off before it explodes. Yamata lands safely and reunites with his comrades before they return home, unaware that the boy has one of the organisms in his bag.

== Cast ==
- Masanori Mimoto as Yamata
- Shuji Kashiwabara as Jinnai
- Donpei Tsuchihira as Nezumi
- Mika Hijii as Rin
- Yuuki Ogoe as Nishii
- Ben Hiura as Iga Master

== Production ==
The project was first announced at the 2009 Asian Film Festival. In November 2009, it was announced that distribution rights were sold by Nikkatsu to Revolver Entertainment for the United Kingdom and to M Pictures for Thailand. The sale marked Nikkatsu's first such deal with London and Los Angeles-based Revolver. Alien vs Ninja is the first title for Nikkatsu's new label Sushi Typhoon. Principal filming was completed in early 2010, and the film's world premiere was at the New York Asian Film Festival on July 3, 2010.

== Release ==
Alien vs Ninja premiered at the 2010 New York Asian Film Festival on July 3, 2010. It was released in Japan on July 23, 2011.

== Reception ==
On Film Business Asia, Derek Elley gave the film a 6 out of 10, calling it an "enjoyably trashy ninja nonsense that's smarter than its appears at first glance."
