= Wakakozake =

Japanese manga series and its adaptations

- Cover of first manga volume

ワカコ酒
- Genre: Cooking, iyashikei
- Manga
- Written by: Chie Shinkyu
- Published by: Tokuma Shoten
- Magazine: Monthly Comic Zenon; Web Comic Zenyon
- Original run: September 2011 – present
- Volumes: 24
- Anime television series
- Directed by: Minoru Yamaoka
- Studio: Office DCI
- Original network: Tokyo MX, Sun TV
- Original run: July 5, 2015 – September 20, 2015
- Episodes: 12
- Manga

Taishū Sakaba Wakao - Wakako-zake Betten
- Written by: Nenzu Nyanbara
- Published by: Tokuma Shoten
- Magazine: Web Comic Zenyon
- Original run: January 2019 – July 2022
- Volumes: 7

Wakakozake (ワカコ酒; lit. 'Wakako Sake') is a Japanese manga series by Chie Shinkyu. It has been serialized by Tokuma Shoten in the seinen manga magazine Monthly Comic Zenon since the September 2011 issue; it is also available on Web Comic Zenyon. The series has twenty-four volumes so far; the first volume was released in May 2013, and the latest release in February 2025.

It was adapted into a Japanese television drama by North Stars Pictures starring Rina Takeda, and a short-length anime television series by Office DCI aired from July 5, 2015, to September 20, 2015. Season 1 of the live action adaptation was aired April 3, 2015, followed by the second season, released on January 8, 2016, and the third season, released on April 7, 2017. After a year's hiatus, the fourth season aired on January 7, 2019. On October 24, 2019, TV Tokyo and Monthly Comic Zenon simultaneously announced that the Season 5 of the live-action adaptation would air in January 2020.

All adaptations, both anime and live-action, were broadcast on TV Tokyo and BS Japan. The anime is currently streaming on Crunchyroll, with the platform also streaming two early seasons of the live-action adaptation; both are distributed by SPO Entertainment. As of 2019, it is unknown when Crunchyroll will release Seasons 3, 4, and 5 of the live-action Wakakozake.

A spin-off manga written by Nenzu Nyanbara titled Taishū Sakaba Wakao - Wakako-zake Betten was serialized in Tokuma Shoten's Web Comic Zenyon from January 2019 to July 2022. Seven volumes were published.

== Plot ==
The series follows the daily adventures of Wakako Murasaki, an ordinary 26-year-old salary woman. After a tiring day's work, she goes off alone to explore various local restaurants, pubs, food stalls and the like and tries out random Japanese food that she usually pairs up with an alcoholic beverage.

She is said to be a drinker girl with a taste for liquor. Whenever her drink compliments her food, Wakako shows her contentment with a sigh of "pshū" (プシュー).

Oftentimes, Wakako goes to faraway cities as well to try out cuisines or even go out with her close friends. In the first few seasons of the live action, she also stays at home or visits others to cook with her friends or try out cuisines from venues rather than actual restaurants.

== Characters ==
Wakako Murasaki
Voice TV Anime Version – Miyuki Sawashiro / Minami Takahashi
The 26 years old main character. Originally from Hiroshima she works as an office lady in Tokyo.
Miura (Miura)
Voice TV Anime Version – ()
The nickname is "Mi-san". A bright and cheerful woman working in the same department as Wakako.
Nakano (Nakano)
Voice TV Anime Version – ()
The nickname is "Hossie". A firm woman who works in the same department as Wakako.
Shiraishi (Shiraishi)
Voice TV Anime Version – ()
A junior man whose Wakako serves as a teaching staff.
Chief Okada
Voice TV Anime Version – ()
Male serving as chief in the department to which Wakako belongs.
Stupid
Voice TV Anime Version – ()
A married man who is one of Wakako's friends.
Hiroki
Voice TV Anime Version – ()
Wakako's relationship.

== Media ==
=== Manga ===
Wakakozake by Chie Shinkyu, 24 volumes already published (as of April 20, 2025)

1. ISBN 978-4-19-980145-7 (May 20, 2013)
2. ISBN 978-4-19-980178-5 (December 20, 2013)
3. ISBN 978-4-19-980229-4 (August 20, 2014)
4. ISBN 978-4-19-980247-8 (December 20, 2014)
5. ISBN 978-4-04067154-3 (November, 2014) In addition
6. ISBN 978-4-19-980277-5 (July 18, 2015)
7. ISBN 978-4-19-980325-3 (January 20, 2016)
8. ISBN 978-4-19-881090-0 (Anime DVD with 12 episodes (main part: 24 minutes) with 6 volumes limited edition)
9. ISBN 978-4-19-980353-6 (July 20, 2016)
10. ISBN 978-4-19-980389-5 (January 20, 2017)
11. ISBN 978-4-19-980435-9 (August 19, 2017)
12. ISBN 978-4-19-980477-9 (February 20, 2018)
13. ISBN 978-4-19-980513-4 (August 20, 2018)
14. ISBN 978-4-19-980554-7 (February 20, 2019)
15. ISBN 978-4-19-980586-8 (August 20, 2019)
16. ISBN 978-4-19-980618-6 (February 20, 2020)
17. ISBN 978-4-86720-161-9 (August 20, 2020)
18. ISBN 978-4-86720-199-2 (February 20, 2021)
19. ISBN 978-4-86720-252-4 (August 20, 2021)
20. ISBN 978-4-86720-303-3 (February 19, 2022)
21. ISBN 978-4-86720-404-7 (August 20, 2022)
22. ISBN 978-4-86720-471-9 (February 20, 2023)
23. ISBN 978-4-86720-534-1 (August 19, 2023)
24. ISBN 978-4-86720-619-5 (February 20, 2024)
25. ISBN 978-4-86720-680-5 (August 20, 2024)
26. ISBN 978-4-86720-741-3 (February 20, 2025)

=== Anime ===
An anime adaptation was broadcast from July 5 to September 20, 2015; it was a short animation of 3 minutes per episode.

Crunchyroll announced in August 2015 that they have the rights to stream it in English.

==== Episodes ====
No.	Title	Original release date
1	"Grilled Salted Salmon" "Sake no Shioyaki" (鮭の塩焼き)	July 5, 2015
2	"Fried Chicken" "Tori no Kara'age" (鶏のから揚げ)	July 12, 2015
3	"Monkfish Liver in Ponzu" "Ankimo Ponzu" (あん肝ポン酢)	July 19, 2015
4	"Sea Urchin Cresson" "Uni Kureson" (ウニクレソン)	July 26, 2015
5	"Yakitori" "Yakitori" (焼き鳥)	August 2, 2015
6	"Steamed Clams" "Asari no Sakamushi" (あさりの酒蒸し)	August 9, 2015
7	"Potato Salad" "Poteto Sarada" (ポテトサラダ)	August 16, 2015
8	"Goya Chanpuru" "Gōya Chanpurū" (ゴーヤチャンプルー)	August 23, 2015
9	"Crab Miso" "Kani Miso" (かにみそ)	August 30, 2015
10	"Deep-Fried Asparagus Skewers" "Asupara no Kusiage" (アスパラの串揚げ)	September 6, 2015
11	"Grilled Arabesque Greenling" "Hokke" (ほっけ)	September 13, 2015
12	"Roasted Ginkgo Nuts" "Iri Gin'nan" (炒りぎんなん)	September 20, 2015

=== Japanese TV drama ===
The live-adaptation of manga series Wakakozake is produced by North Stars Pictures, TV Tokyo and RCC Broadcasting. Released from 2015 to 2019 (hiatus in 2018), the drama series consists of 12 episodes of 30-minutes each. Followed by the announcement from the volume 3 of the manga, which began selling on August 24, 2014, casts was announced in October that same year.

Season 1 was released on April 3 until July 30, 2015, Season 2 was released on January 8 until April 1, 2016, Season 3 was released on April 7 until June 23, 2017, and currently, Season 4 was released on January 7 until March 25, 2019. Season 5 was released in April 2020, followed by a special aired on December 29–30 that year. Due to the COVID-19 pandemic, the series took another hiatus in 2021, and Season 6 was aired on January 10, 2022.

Japanese actress Rina Takeda played the titular character Wakako Murasaki on all seasons of the series, alongside recurring casts Yoshihiro Nozoe and Kenta Kamakari. All seasons of the series are broadcast on TV Tokyo and BS Japan respectively. Currently, Crunchyroll broadcast the first two seasons of the series.

=== Korean TV drama ===
Cheers to Me (나에게 건배, Naege Geonbae) was the Korean remake of the series, released on South Korea on December 10, 2015, until January 7, 2016, 10 episodes with 25 minutes, original network UMAX Network and O'live.

An ordinary single woman who enjoys cooking and dining alone in the evenings, Ra Yeo Joo is an editor at a publishing house where she's worked for the past ten years, while Lee Jae Yoon works in marketing at the same company. Their relationship is sometimes friendly, sometimes flirty, and sometimes competitive. They have different approaches to food: while she finds healing in food and drink, his goal in life is to live lean and long, until he discovers new pleasures and changes because of her.

Rina Takeda makes a cameo appearance in the show.

== Reception ==
It was ranked 10th in 2014 Recommended comic selected by nationwide writing clerks.
