= Welcome to the Quiet Room =

2007 Japanese comedy-drama Film directed by Suzuki Matsuo

- DVD cover
- Japanese: クワイエットルームにようこそ
- Directed by: Suzuki Matsuo
- Screenplay by: Suzuki Matsuo
- Produced by: Takako Imamura; Shinji Ogawa
- Starring: Yuki Uchida; Kankurō Kudō; Yū Aoi; Ryō; Yūko Nakamura
- Cinematography: Akihiro Okabayashi
- Edited by: Soichi Ueno
- Music by: Hajime Mori; Takashi Mori
- Release date: October 20, 2007 (Japan)
- Running time: 118 minutes
- Country: Japan
- Language: Japanese

Welcome to the Quiet Room (Japanese: クワイエットルームにようこそ, Hepburn: Quiet room ni yôkoso) is a Japanese comedy drama film released in 2007 in Japan, directed by Suzuki Matsuo.

It stars Yuki Uchida in the main role, and features two famous movie and anime directors in secondary roles: Hideaki Anno and Shinya Tsukamoto.

== Plot ==
Asuka Sakura (Yuki Uchida), a twenty-eight year old moderately successful freelance writer with a hectic and stressful life filled with deadlines and demanding editors, suddenly awakens to find herself restrained in a white room in a psychiatric ward with no memory of how she got there. A nurse reveals that Sakura has been in a coma for three days following a suicide attempt after which she was discovered and brought to the hospital by her live-in boyfriend, Tetsuo (Kudo Kankuro), who found her unconscious. When Sakura asks about leaving the hospital, she is informed that the decision is up to her doctor and caregiver, as it is believed that she was at risk of committing suicide. She argues that she didn't intentionally try and commit suicide, and that she should be released as she has a looming deadline for work, but the doctors are unconvinced. Moreover, Sakura learns that to be released Tetsuo must give his approval first as he has had her committed to the institution believing she had tried to kill herself.

Desperate to prove that she is sane, Sakura struggles with her new life in the psychiatric hospital as she becomes introduced to the other patients such as Miki (Yu Aoi), a young woman with an eating-disorder who shows her the ropes of life in the mental world and guides her through the corridors of the small facility. As time goes on, Sakura begins remembering details of the events prior to her hospitalization and it starts to become less clear whether she intended to commit suicide or not as it is shown her day consisted mostly of interviewing people, fielding calls from editors about deadlines, watching television, drinking, and taking sleeping pills. Through a series of flashbacks narrated over by a deadpan Sakura in the hospital, she confronts her past as it is revealed that she was once a model and that she had been married and divorced prior to her relationship with Tetsuo, who was the one that was giving her leads to her writing gigs that resulted in growing stress as deadlines piled up. As she continues to reflect on her life prior to her incident, Sakura realizes that her life wasn't as happy as she had convinced herself, and the illusion begins to fade as she struggles with guilt over an incident in her prior marriage and comes to grips with her depression and the impact as it has had on her life. Having come to terms with her past and learning how to cope and take control of her life again, she is released from the ward and is seen laughing at something she sees through a car window.

== Cast ==
- Yuki Uchida – Asuka Sakura
- Kankurō Kudō – Tetsuo Yakihata
- Yū Aoi – Miki
- Ryō – Eguchi
- Yūko Nakamura – Kurita
- Satoshi Tsumabuki – Komono
- Shinobu Otake – Nishino
- Hideaki Anno – Doctor Matsubara
- Shinya Tsukamoto – Asuka's ex-husband

== Links and sources ==
- Official website (in Japanese)
- Welcome to the Quiet Room at IMDb
- Review at Variety
- Review at Japan Times Online
- Review at Dreamlogic.net
- Review at "Love HK film.com"
