= Mi-Chemin =

Studio album by Yuki Uchida
- Released: 21 September 1995
- Recorded: Japan
- Genre: J-pop
- Label: King Records

Yuki Uchida chronology
Junjō Karen Otome Moyō (1995)	Mi-Chemin (1995)	Merry Christmas for You (1995)

Mi-Chemin is Yuki Uchida's second album, released in Japan on 21 September 1995 by King Records (reference: KICS-510). It reached number three on the Oricon Albums Chart.

== Track listing ==
1. Made in Asia (MADE IN ASIA)
2. Barairo Knockin' Beat (バラ色Knockin'Beat)
3. Odoru Crazy Girl no Bouken (踊るCrazy Girlの冒険)
4. Tabun Sou ne Kitto (たぶん・そうね・きっと)
5. Ame Nochi Ame (雨のち雨)
6. Toui Kioku (遠い記憶)
7. "Suimasen" (「すいません」)
8. Yurenaide Kokoro (揺れないでココロ)
9. Getsuyoubi no Asa (月曜日の朝)
10. Baby's Growing Up ~Slow version~ (BABY'S GROWING UP ~SLOW VERSION~)
11. Bonus Track : Only You ~Tribal Mix~
