= Junjō Karen Otome Moyō =

Studio album by Yuki Uchida
- Released: 8 February 1995
- Recorded: Japan
- Genre: J-pop
- Label: King Records

Yuki Uchida chronology
Junjō Karen Otome Moyō	Mi-Chemin

Junjō Karen Otome Moyō (純情可憐乙女模様) is Yuki Uchida's first album, released in Japan on 8 February 1995 by King Records (reference: KICS-470). It reached number one on the Oricon charts. It includes the title song from her previous number-one single Tenca wo Torō! -Uchida no Yabō-.

== Track listing ==
1. Never Ending Story ~Yoroshiku Version~ (...~ヨロシク バージョン~) (0:57)
2. Dakara Kotte Yamerenai! (だから恋ってやめられない!) (4:16)
3. Glowing Days (Glowing days) (4:00)
4. Papa wa Anata ga Kirai Mitai (パパはあなたがキライみたい) (4:36)
5. Junjō Karen Otome Moyō (純情可憐乙女模様) (4:16)
6. Kitakaze to Taiyō (北風と太陽) (4:22)
7. Renai Therapist (恋愛セラピスト) (3:50)
8. Kanashii Hodo Kataomoi (哀しいほど片想い) (4:49)
9. Heartbreak Curry (ハートブレイク・カレー) (4:21)
10. Tenca wo Torō! -Uchida no Yabō- (TENCAを取ろう! -内田の野望-) (4:06)
11. Osewa ni Narimashita (お世話になりました) (4:17)
12. Never Ending Story ~Arigatō Version~ (...~アリガトウ バージョン~) (1:34)
