= Ai no Baka =

Studio album by Yuki Uchida
- Released: 23 March 1996
- Recorded: Japan
- Genre: J-pop
- Label: King Records

Yuki Uchida chronology
| Merry Christmas for You (1995) | Ai no Baka (1996) | nakitakunalu (1996) |

Ai no Baka (愛のバカ, lit. "Love's Fool") is the third studio album by Japanese singer Yuki Uchida. It was released on March 23, 1996, by King Records, reaching number 20 on the Oricon charts. A stylistic departure from Uchida's idol output, the record was praised for its experimental nature. It features contributions from Chara, among others.

== Track listing ==
1. Oikaketekuru Tsuki (追いかけてくる月)
2. Be My Boy (BE MY BOY)
3. Baby's Universe
4. Mō Iya (もぉ いや)
5. Secret Dial wo Mawase (シークレットダイヤルを廻せ)
6. Hijyōkaidan de Odoru (非常階段で踊る)
7. Robber no Circus (ロバのサーカス)
8. Chikyū ga Naiteiru (地球が泣いている)
9. Senaka wa Misenai (背中は見せない)
10. Gin no Pendant (銀のペンダント)
