= Shuji Kashiwabara =

Japanese actor (born 1978)

- 柏原 収史
- Born: December 23, 1978 (age 47); Kofu, Yamanashi, Japan
- Occupation: Actor
- Years active: 1994–present
- Relatives: Takashi Kashiwabara (brother); Yuki Uchida (sister-in-law)

Shuji Kashiwabara (柏原 収史, Kashiwabara Shūji; born December 23, 1978) is a Japanese actor.

== Career ==
Kashiwabara starred in Yoshihiko Matsui's 2008 film Where Are We Going? He has also appeared in films such as A Day on the Planet and Alien vs Ninja.

== Filmography ==
=== Films ===
- Close-Knit (2017)
- The Setting Sun (2022)
- Confess to Your Crimes (2023)
- Zagin de Shisu!? (2024)
- There Was Such a Thing Before (2025)

=== Television ===
- Asa ga Kita (2015–2016), Ōkubo Toshimichi
- Segodon (2018), Matsudaira Katamori
