= Sono toki Heartwa Nusumareta =

- Starring: Sae Isshiki (一色紗英); Yuki Uchida (内田有紀); Takuya Kimura (木村拓哉)
- Country of origin: Japan
- No. of episodes: 5

Production
- Running time: Approx. 48 min.

Original release
- Network: Fuji TV
- Release: 19 November – 17 December 1992

Sono toki Heartwa Nusumareta (その時ハ-トは盜まれた, Sono toki Hātowa nusumareta; lit. "At that moment, my heart was stolen") is a five-part drama that aired on Fuji TV. It first aired in Japan from November 19, 1992 to December 17, 1992. It features a theme song by Yumi Matsutoya (Fuyu no Owari). It is one of the earliest Japanese television dramas to depict same-sex attraction between women, as part of the increased visibility of queer themes during the early 1990s 'gay boom' in Japanese media.

== Cast ==
- Sae Isshiki as Yuko Siina
- Takuya Kimura as Masato Katase
- Yuki Uchida as Saki Aso
- Kijima Sario
- Agarita Aki
- Watanabe Ko
- Chieko Matsubara
- Kenjirō Ishimaru
- Tomoko Ikuta
- Saiki Shigeru
- Miki Ryosuke
- Akikawa Lisa

== Synopsis ==
This five-part mini series (for Japanese standards) deals with the growing pains of a high school girl who has to deal with bisexuality and how Japanese culture views this. The heroine is a slightly childish girl who has a huge crush on the basketball star player of her school, who in turn has a crush on a new more mature-seeming girl in her class. While the heroine first seems to resent the new girl, she soon finds herself falling in love with her as well, and a strange competition and yet companionship develops between her and her former crush, the basketball player.
