= Toki o Kakeru Shōjo (1994 TV series) =

- VHS cover
- Also known as: The Girl Who Leapt Through Time
- Created by: Yasutaka Tsutsui
- Written by: Ryōichi Kimizuka
- Directed by: Masayuki Ochiai; Yuichi Sato
- Starring: Yuki Uchida
- Composer: Joe Hisaishi
- No. of episodes: 5

Original release
- Network: Fuji Television
- Release: February 19 – March 19, 1994

Toki o Kakeru Shōjo (時をかける少女; lit. "The Girl Who Leapt Through Time") is the second live-action television adaptation of the novel of the same name. It aired as a five-episode Japanese television live-action TV series broadcast on Fuji Television between February 19 and March 19, 1994, directed by Masayuki Ochiai and Yūichi Satō, with screenplay by Ryōichi Kimizuka and music by Joe Hisaishi. It stars the then-rookie idol Yuki Uchida in the main role, and also features the writer of the original book, Yasutaka Tsutsui, and the then-unknown idols Miho Kanno (the first Tomie), Ranran Suzuki and her then-rabbit-cosplayed-partner in the children TV show Ponkikies: future J-pop star Namie Amuro. The series' theme song is "Mermaid" (人魚, Ningyo) by Nokko.

== Cast ==
- Yuki Uchida as Kazuko Yoshiyama
- Yoshihiko Hakamada as Kazuo Fukamachi
- Gamon Kaai as Gorō Asakura
- Ranran Suzuki as Mariko Kanda
- Miho Kanno
- Leo Morimoto
- Namie Amuro
- Yasutaka Tsutsui
- Kyoko Yoshizawa
- B-saku Sato
- Yoko Moriguchi
