= Cat's Eye (1997 film) =

- Film poster
- Directed by: Kaizo Hayashi
- Screenplay by: Kaizo Hayashi; Tokio Tsuchiya
- Based on: Cat's Eye by Tsukasa Hojo
- Produced by: Akitoshi Takuma; Hiroshi Shirai; Shunsuke Koga; Kazutoshi Wadakura
- Cinematography: Takahide Shibanushi; Shinji Ogawa
- Edited by: Nobuko Tomita
- Music by: Miina Co.
- Production company: Fuji Television
- Distributed by: Toho
- Release date: August 27, 1997 (Japan)
- Running time: 92 minutes
- Country: Japan

Cat's Eye (キャッツ・アイ, Kyattsu Ai) is a 1997 Japanese film directed by Kaizo Hayashi and starring Yuki Uchida and Norika Fujiwara. It is a live-action movie adaptation of the manga series of the same name.

== Cast ==
- Yuki Uchida as Ai Kisugi
- Norika Fujiwara as Rui Kisugi
- Izumi Inamori as Hitomi Kisugi
- Kenta Harada as Toshio Utsumi
- Naoko Yamazaki as Mitsuko Asatani
- Kane Kosugi as Lee/Black Flag
- Wenli Jiang as Miss Wang
- Akaji Maro
- Shirō Sano as Chief
- Akira Terao

== Release ==
Cat's Eye was released in Japan on August 27, 1997, where it was distributed by Toho.

== Merchandise ==
=== Video ===
A behind-the-scenes video was created for the movie, called Cat's Eye Secret.

=== Photobook ===
A companion photobook was produced by Wani Books. It contains photographs of the stars in character.

== Notes ==
=== References ===
- Galbraith IV, Stuart (2008). The Toho Studios Story: A History and Complete Filmography. Scarecrow Press. ISBN 978-1461673743.
