= High Kick Girl! =

2009 film by Fuyuhiko Nishi

- DVD cover

Japanese name
- Kanji: ハイキック・ガール!
Transcriptions
- Revised Hepburn: Hai kikku gāru!
- Directed by: Fuyuhiko Nishi
- Written by: Fuyuhiko Nishi; Yoshikatsu Kimura
- Produced by: Ken Nakanishi; Fuyuhiko Nishi
- Starring: Rina Takeda
- Cinematography: Nobuyuki Matsui
- Edited by: Hiroshi Kawahara
- Music by: Tomoo Misato
- Distributed by: Toei Company
- Release dates: May 24, 2009 (Terracotta); May 30, 2009 (Japan)
- Running time: 81 minutes
- Country: Japan
- Language: Japanese

High Kick Girl! (Japanese: ハイキック・ガール!, Hepburn: Hai kikku gāru!) is a 2009 Japanese martial arts film directed and co-written by Fuyuhiko Nishi and starring Rina Takeda.

== Plot ==
A brown belt girl who desperately wants to get a black belt and believes she can qualify for it by facing a group of black belt holders.

== Cast ==
- Rina Takeda as Kei Tsuchiya
- Tatsuya Naka as Yoshiaki Matsumura
- Hisae Watanabe as Shurei
- Yuka Kobayashi
- Akihito Yagi as Kuuken
- Ryuki Takahashi as Ryousuke Nakama
- Sayaka Akimoto as Rika

== Reception ==
The Japan Times gave the film a rating of 2.5 out of 5. Nippon Cinema gave the film an average review. The Hollywood Reporter and Variety gave the film a modest review also.

== DVD releases ==
First Look Studios (America)

- Aspect Ratio: Widescreen (1:78:1) anamorphic
- Sound: Japanese (Dolby Digital 5.1 Surround), English (Dolby Digital 5.1 Surround)
- Subtitles: English
- Supplements: "Making of High Kick Girl!" featurette, "Rina's Action Techniques" featurette, "Naka's Action Techniques" featurette
- Region 1, NTSC
