= Nakitakunalu =

nakitakunalu

Studio album by Yuki Uchida
- Released: 10 October 1996
- Recorded: Japan
- Genre: J-pop
- Label: King Records

Yuki Uchida chronology
Ai no Baka (1996)	nakitakunalu (1996)	Present (1997)

nakitakunalu is Yuki Uchida's fifth album (including one EP), released in Japan on 10 October 1996 by King Records (reference: KICS-600). It reached number 18 on the Oricon Albums Chart.

== Track listing ==
1. Torikago no Naka no Boku (鳥かごの中の僕)
2. Nakitaku Naru (泣きたくなる)
3. Yume wo Misasete (夢を見させて)
4. Nagareboshi (流れ星)
5. Kiss wo Shita (キスをした)
6. Amanogawa (天の川)
7. Present (プレゼント)
8. Shingō (信号)
9. Suki ni Nare (好きになれ)
10. Shiawase ni Naritai (幸せになりたい) (Bonus track)
11. Ever & Ever (Randy Waldman Strings Mix) (EVER & EVER...) (Bonus track)
