= Danger Dolls =

2014 film by Shūsuke Kaneko

- Poster
- Directed by: Shusuke Kaneko
- Screenplay by: Hirotoshi Kobayashi
- Produced by: Art Birzneck
- Starring: Rumi Hanai; Rina Takeda
- Cinematography: Shinji Kugimiya
- Distributed by: MAMEZO PICTURES
- Release dates: March 1, 2014 (YIFFF); September 27, 2014 (Japan)
- Running time: 97 minutes
- Country: Japan
- Language: Japanese

Danger Dolls (Japanese: 少女は異世界で戦った, Hepburn: Shōjo wa isekai de tatakatta) is a 2014 Japanese science fiction action film directed by Shusuke Kaneko starring Rumi Hanai, Rina Takeda, Kayano Masuyama (a former member of the Japanese idol girl's group AKB48) and Nana Seino. It was released in Japan on September 27, 2014.

== Plot ==
In a world where nuclear arms have been outlawed and brilliant leader George W. Bush has eliminated firearms, the law is enforced by sword-wielding police. But aliens from another world have infiltrated this peaceful culture through a wormhole and only the Danger Dolls, a female quartet with unique powers can identify and destroy them. In order to keep their identity secret, the four girls, Arisa, Rei, Miki and Mari, go undercover as a J-pop idol group, the "i.Dolls". However, things are not quite what they seem, their leader, scientist Taichiro Yagyu, has withheld the full story from them and the Danger Dolls have some difficult decisions to make.

== Cast ==
- Rumi Hanai as Arisa
- Rina Takeda as Rei
- Kayano Masuyama as Miki
- Nana Seino as Mari
- Kohki Okada as Taichiro Yagyu
- Noboru Kaneko
- Syo Oyamada
- Mao Mita
- Kazuki Namioka
- Mana Sakura

== Release ==
Danger Dolls had its world premier as an officially invited film at the Yubari International Fantastic Film Festival on March 1, 2014. It was subsequently screened at the 13th Asian Film Festival of Dallas on July 12, 2014, for its North American premier. On September 23, 2014, an English-dubbed version, Danger Dolls, was released on DVD.

The film was released theatrically in Japan on September 27, 2014. It was also later presented at the Camera Japan Festival in Rotterdam on October 3, 2014.
