= Harry Brannon =

American singer-songwriter

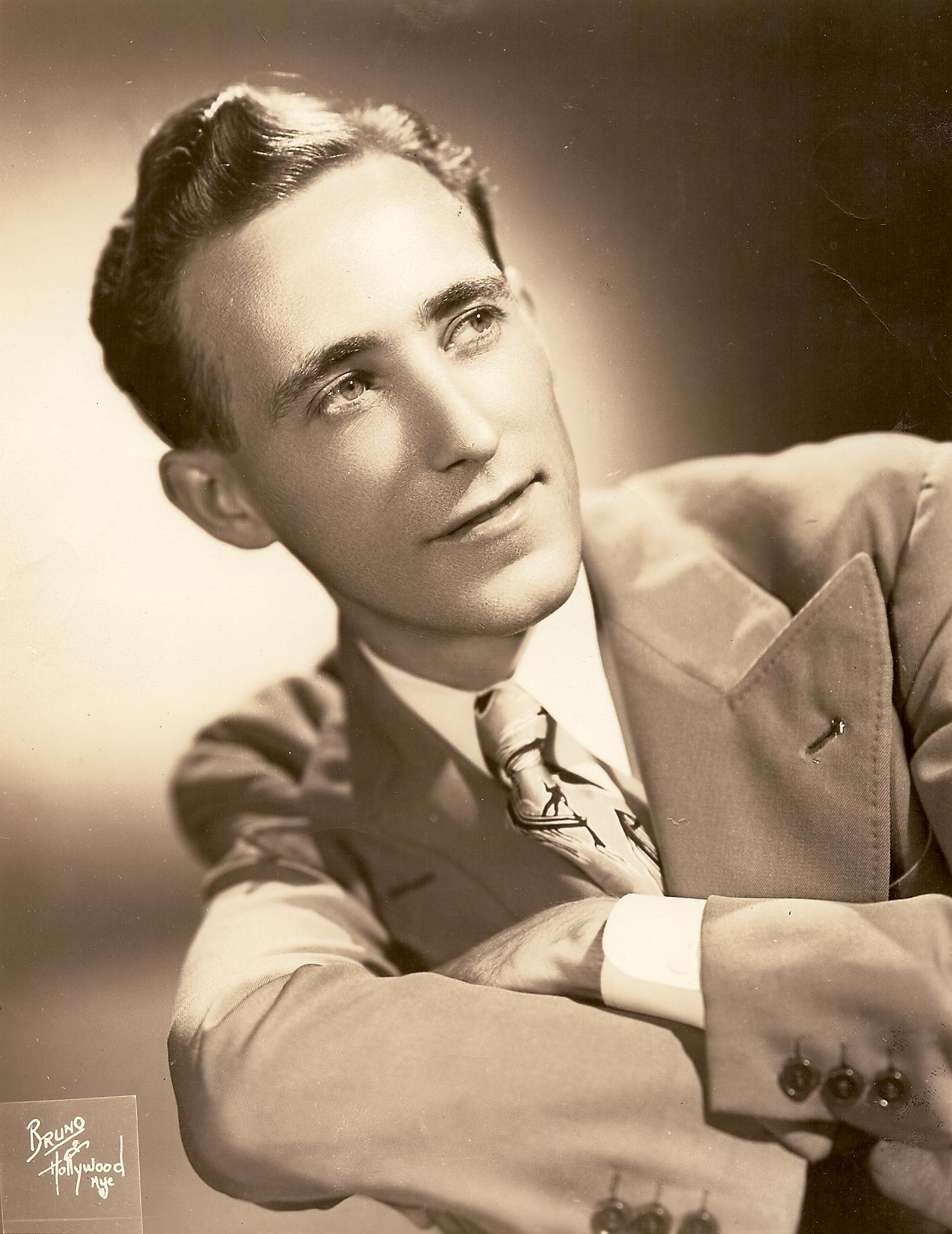

Harry Brannon's Recording
Crooner Harry Brannon's 1948 recording of I'm a Tumbleweed

Harry Brannon (June 19, 1920 – December 29, 1991) was an American popular singer born in Gloucester City, New Jersey.

Brannon regularly introduced new pop songs in a live format over New York City radio on the WOR Mutual Broadcasting Company broadcast coast to coast. Early in November 1949, Brannon sang "Rudolph the Red-Nosed Reindeer" over the airwaves for WOR, promoting the Gene Autry classic. By November 25, "Rudolph the Red-Nosed Reindeer" began its appearance on the music charts. Various popular artists had initially turned down the opportunity to promote the record, including Bing Crosby, due to its slow tempo. However, after hearing the faster and more upbeat Brannon rendition, Crosby sang his own rendition during his CBS The Bing Crosby – Chesterfield Show radio show on December 14, 1949.

Brannon is known to have recorded at least two songs during his short career in music. Both were released in early 1948. One was titled "Orchids in the Snow", written by composer Edward A. Khoury, and the other was titled "I'm a Tumbleweed", written by Rusty Keefer.

In March, 1954, Bing Crosby, still mourning the recent death of his wife Dixie Lee, was considering retirement. Almost immediately, plans were made by a Hollywood production company to issue a biopic of the famous crooner and approached Brannon (who possessed a similar appearance to Crosby) to play the lead. As Brannon mulled over the offer, he became aware of organized-crime connections to the project. Brannon "dragged his feet" and put it off as long as possible until Crosby, revelling in the success of his recently released film White Christmas, rescinded his retirement plans and the biopic was shelved indefinitely.

Due to a deferred movie career and through the prompting of his wife, Pauline Woolman-Brannon (ex-wife of stuntman Harry Woolman), Brannon left New York City (and the recording industry) in late 1954 and resettled in Gloucester City, New Jersey. Brannon took a management position at a nightclub called Lew Palma's House of Fun on Powell Street. Brannon was a regular performer in it and lived with his family on the second floor.

Through his wife, Brannon soon became affiliated with the Reorganized Church of Jesus Christ of Latter Day Saints, presently known as the Community of Christ, and was ordained as a priest by the mid-1960s.

Brannon's adopted son, Harry Gerald Brannon, a Sergeant in the United States Army, died in South Vietnam on August 15, 1966, at age 30. Harry, known as Jerry, was the biological son of stuntman Harry Woolman.

He died of Alzheimer's disease at age 71.
