= Yuki Uchida =

Japanese actress (born 1975)

- 内田 有紀
- Born: Uchida Yuki; November 16, 1975 (age 50); Nihonbashi, Chūō, Tokyo, Japan
- Occupation: Actress
- Years active: 1989–2002, 2006–present
- Spouses: Hidetaka Yoshioka (m. 2002; div. 2005); Takashi Kashiwabara (m. 2026)
- Relatives: Shuji Kashiwabara (brother-in-law)
- Musical career
- Genre: J-pop
- Instrument: Vocals
- Label: King Records

Yuki Uchida (内田 有紀, Uchida Yuki) (born November 16, 1975) is a Japanese actress and former idol singer. Following her debut in the drama Sono Toki, Heart wa Nusumareta (1992), she received her first lead role in the 1994 drama adaption of The Girl Who Leapt Through Time.

Uchida became a popular teen idol and began a short-lived music career with the single "Tenca wo Torou! (Uchida no Yabou)", which made her the first female singer in Oricon history to have their first single debut at the summit. Uchida made her film debut starring in the 1995 adaption of Boys Over Flowers. By the late-1990s, Uchida began to shed her idol image and concentrated on her television career.

Uchida is best known as a character actress, recognized for her roles in Bambino! (2007) and Doctor-X: Surgeon Michiko Daimon, which ran for seven seasons starting in 2012. She returned to the silver screen after ten years with Welcome to the Quiet Room (2010), earning praise for her performance.

== Biography ==
Uchida was born in Tokyo. She practiced fencing in high school, and ranked 3rd in a tournament in Tokyo in 1991.

She began her career as a model in commercials, notably for the confectionery company Lotte (ロッテ), then debuted in acting in 1992 in the drama Sono Toki, Heart wa Nusumareta. She became a swimsuit model for the swimwear company Unitika in 1993, and got popular as an idol, partly due to her then unusual tomboyish look with short hair and husky voice. She began to get large exposure in commercials and media, and hosted her own weekly 30mn late radio show, Yozora ni YOUKISS!, from April 1994 to March 2001 on Nippon Broadcasting.

She released her first single at the end of 1994, "TENCA wo Torou!", theme of one of her dramas, which ranked number 1 in the Oricon music charts, the first time for a solo debuting female singer, with a record of sales in this category only topped by Erika Sawajiri's debut single 12 years later. She went on a successful singing career for the next two years, her first album ranking number 1, with hits written by Tetsuya Komuro (notably "Only You" and "Baby's Growing Up"). The latter part of Uchida's music career saw a pivot from idol music as she began to write her own lyrics, before ceasing activities as a singer in the late 1990s.

She was cast in many dramas and movies, often as the lead actress, most notably in the live movies adaptations of the famous manga Hana yori dango (Boys over Flowers) (as Makino) in 1995, and Cat's Eye (as Ai) in 1997. After ten years away from the big screen, she made her comeback to cinema in 2007, in Takeshi Kitano's "Kantoku Banzai!", and in the leading role of "Welcome to the Quiet Room", movie set in a psychiatric hospital, in which she appears in all the scenes. Since 2012, she has played anesthesiologist Hiromi Jonouchi in the popular medical drama, Doctor-X Surgeon Michiko Daimon.

== Private life ==
She retired from show business when she married actor Hidetaka Yoshioka on November 28, 2002, but returned to acting in 2006, after her divorce in December 2005.

In 2009, Uchida began a serious relationship with her former Big Wing co-star Takashi Kashiwabara, after they reconnected through mutual friends. They had appeared in various commercials playing a couple 15 years earlier. On April 3, 2026, Uchida posted a photo on her official website revealing the two holding hands displaying their wedding rings, confirming they had officially registered their marriage.

== Filmography ==
=== Film ===
Year	Title	Role	Notes	Ref.
1995	Boys Over Flowers	Tsukushi Makino	Lead role	
1997	Cat's Eye	Ai Kisugi	Lead role	
2010	Bayside Shakedown 3: Set the Guys Loose	Natsumi Shinohara		
2024	Doctor-X: The Movie	Hiromi Jonouchi		
2025	The Solitary Gourmet	Shiho		
2027	The Tiger and Her Wings: The Movie	Yoshimi Segawa		

=== Television ===
Year	Title	Role	Notes	Ref.
1992	Sono Toki, Heart wa Nusumareta	Saki Aso		
1993	Under the Same Roof	Rina		
1994	At Seventeen	Takumi Hidaka	Lead role	
1994	The Girl Who Leapt Through Time	Kazuko Yoshiyama	Lead role; miniseries	
2001	Big Wing	Kumiko	Lead role	
2002	Kita no Kuni Kara 2002: Yuigon	Yui Takamura	Two-part television miniseries	
2012–2025	Second to Last Love	Mariko Nagakura	3 seasons	
2012–2021	Doctor-X: Surgeon Michiko Daimon	Hiromi Jonouchi	7 seasons	
2014	Gunshi Kanbei	Nōhime	Taiga drama	
2018	Manpuku	Saki Imai	Asadora	
2021	The Grand Family	Aiko Takasu		
2022	Umeko: The Face of Female Education	Tsuda Hatsu	Television film	
2023	Fixer	Reiko Sawamura		
2024	Swallows	Yūko Kusaoke		
2025	Chihayafuru: Full Circle	Toko Aizawa	Special appearance	

=== Dubbing ===
- Ant-Man (2015), Hope van Dyne (Evangeline Lilly)
- Ant-Man and the Wasp (2018), Hope van Dyne / Wasp (Evangeline Lilly)
- Avengers: Endgame (2019), Hope van Dyne / Wasp (Evangeline Lilly)
- Ant-Man and the Wasp: Quantumania (2023), Hope van Dyne / Wasp (Evangeline Lilly)

== Discography ==
=== Albums ===
Romaji title	Japanese title	Release date	Reference	Oricon
Junjou Karen Otome Moyou	純情可憐乙女模様	1995/02/08	KICS-470	1
Mi-Chemin	Mi-Chemin	1995/09/21	KICS-510	3
Merry Christmas For You	Merry Christmas For You	1995/11/22	KICS-530	19
Ai no Baka	愛のバカ	1996/03/23	KICS-540	20
nakitakunalu	泣きたくなる	1996/10/10	KICS-600	18
Present	Present ~内田有紀 Best Album~	1997/12/03	KICS-630	33

=== Singles ===
Romaji title	Japanese title	Release date	Reference	Oricon
TENCA wo Torou! ~Uchida no Yabou~	TENCAを取ろう~内田の野望	1994/10/21	KIDS-220	1
Ashita wa Ashita no Kaze ga Fuku	明日は明日の風が吹く	1995/04/05	KIDS-240	3
Only You	Only You	1995/04/21	KIDS-250	2
Baby's Growing Up	Baby's Growing Up	1995/08/19	KIDS-270	5
Shiawase ni Naritai	幸せになりたい	1996/01/24	KIDS-280	6
Ever & Ever (Uchida Yuki & m.C.A.T)	Ever & Ever	1996/07/17	KIDS-300	8
Aishiteru	アイシテル	1997/02/21	KIDS-330	23
Da.i.su.ki	Da.i.su.ki	1997/05/21	KIDS-340	29
Heartbreak Sniper	ハートブレイク スナイパー	1998/09/23	KIDS-370	32
Rakuen	楽園	1999/08/25	KIDS-430	28
Rakuen -Memorial Tracks- (maxi-single)	楽園-Memorial Tracks	1999/10/13	KICS-763	67

== Others ==
Concert videos

Uchida's live show	Yuki Uchida 1995 Concert	1996
No make	(Live & interview)	1996
Nakitakunalu	Yuki Uchida Concert 1996	1997
Minna DA I SU KI	Yuki Uchida Concert Tour 1997	1998

Other videos

Visual Queen of The Year '93: Yuki Uchida - La Palette	Swimsuit idol video	1993
The Cat's Secret	Making of Cat's Eye	1997

Photobooks

Visual queen of the year '93	with models Hiroko Tanaka, Maiko Tono, Mitsuko Aoki, Mitchiko Endo.	1993
YUKISS	First solo photobook	1994
Yuki to tsuki to taiyo to	有紀と月と太陽と - Second solo photobook	1995
Yozora ni YOUKISS!	夜空に YOUKISS! - photos, texts and poems taken from her radio show.	1996
Cat's Eye	Cat's Eye movie photobook	1997

Radio

Romaji title	Japanese title	Broadcaster	Release date
Yozora ni YOUKISS!	夜空に YOUKISS!	Nippon Broadcasting	1994–2001
Article 21 Radio Charity MusicSon	第21回 ラジオ・チャリティー・ミュージックソン (Dai 21 Kai Rajio . Charitei . MyujikkuSon)	Nippon Broadcasting	1995
Yuki Uchida's Dusk Street Kids	内田有紀の夕暮れストリートキッズ (Uchida Yuki no Yuugure SutoritoKizzu)	St.GIGA (via Satellaview)	1995
