= Seiji Chiba =

Japanese film director and producer

- Born: November 11, 1964 (age 61); Yokohama, Kanagawa, Japan
- Occupations: Director, producer, writer

Seiji Chiba (千葉誠治, Chiba Seiji; born November 11, 1964) is a Japanese film director and producer.

== Career ==
He moved to the United States in 1990 and studied various aspects of filmmaking at Los Angeles City College, ranging from directing, and screenwriting to editing. After graduating from LACC, he returned to Japan and directed/produced a self-financed film, Two of Us, in 1995. He joined a film production firm and honed his skills as a producer. His commercial directorial debut was in 2001 with A Tale of a Desert Island (Mujintō Monogatari). He has since worked on a variety of projects as a director, producer, and screenwriter.

The movies Chiba directed include, Ganryu Island (Ganryūjima), Toho's 2003 period film starring Masahiro Motoki. In 2004 he directed Messiah (Meshia) and D.P. Chiba's expertise as a period action movie director is evident in The Rebel Ninjas (Tenshō Iga no Ran, 2005), The Rebel Ninjas, Abduction (Iga no Ran, Kōsoku, 2007), Warring Nations, The Rebel Ninjas (Sengoku Iga no Ran, 2009) and The Fugitive Ninja (Nukenin, 2009). His most recent films are the sci-fi action thriller Alien vs Ninja (2010) and The Kunoichi: Ninja Girl (2011).

Chiba established North CKY, Inc., his own production outfit, in December 2006 and has been the CEO of the company since its inception.

== Filmography ==
- 2003: Ganryu Island (Ganryūjima)
- 2004: Messiah (Meshia)
- 2004: D.P
- 2005: Grand Circle
- 2005: The Rebel Ninjas (Tenshō Iga no Ran)
- 2006: red letters
- 2007: The Rebel Ninjas, Abduction (Iga no Ran, Kōsoku)
- 2009: Warring Nations, The Rebel Ninjas / Ninja Battle (Sengoku Iga no Ran)
- 2009: The Fugitive Ninja / Rogue Ninja (Nukenin)
- 2010: Ninja / Evil Ninja
- 2010: Alien vs Ninja
- 2011: The Kunoichi: Ninja Girl
- 2012: I'm Coming to Get You (Ima, yari ni yukimasu)
- 2014: Tokyo Legends I: Horror Of Human Hell (Tôkyô Densetsu: Kyôfu no Ningen Jigoku)
- 2014: Tokyo Legends II: Distorted City of Anomalies (Tôkyô Densetsu: Yuganda Ikei Toshi)
- 2016: Shûkatsu
- 2016: SUPER Horrifying Story ('Chô' kowai hanashi)
- 2017: SUPER Horrifying Story 2 ('Chô' kowai hanashi 2)
- 2018: Hidden Attack of the Dead (Kan-yû)
