= Doug Brannon =

American politician

Member of the South Carolina House of Representatives from the 38th district
- In office 2012–2017
- Succeeded by: Josiah Magnuson

Personal details
- Born: April 22, 1961 (age 65) Detroit, Michigan, United States
- Party: Republican

Norman D. Brannon (born April 22, 1961) is an American politician. He is a former member of the South Carolina House of Representatives from the 38th District, serving from 2012 until 2017. He is a member of the Republican party.
