= Max Brannon =

American politician (1933–2020)

Member of the Georgia State Senate from the 51st district
- In office 1981–1991

Personal details
- Born: Max Ray Brannon; December 22, 1933 Gordon County, Georgia, U.S.
- Died: September 11, 2020 (aged 86)
- Spouse: Gentle Lee Pettett (m. 1954; died 2014)
- Children: 3
- Occupation: Funeral director

Max Ray Brannon (December 22, 1933 – September 11, 2020) was an American politician in the state of Georgia.

Brannon, a funeral director, founded (1967) and operated the Max Brannon and Sons Funeral Home in Calhoun, Georgia. He was also a probate court judge and a coroner for Gordon County, Georgia. He served in the Georgia State Senate for district 51 from 1981 to 1991. Brannon died on September 11, 2020, at the age of 86.
