= Rumi Hanai =

Japanese actress, model and gymnast

- 花井瑠美
- Born: September 30, 1987 (age 37); Tokyo, Japan
- Occupations: actress; model; rhythmic gymnast

Rumi Hanai (花井瑠美, Hanai Rumi) is a Japanese actress, model and former rhythmic gymnast.

== Life and career ==
Hanai was born in Tokyo, Japan on September 30, 1987. She began training in rhythmic gymnastics at age three in the school of Hiroko Yamasaki, who represented Japan in the sport at the 1984 Olympics. Hanai remained in rhythmic gymnastics and participated in a number of tournaments including the All Japan Championship series in 2007 and 2008, until she was twenty-one, when a serious injury forced her to retire.

While in the hospital recuperating from her injury, friends brought her fashion magazines and she was inspired to try modeling. With her gymnastics career ended, Hanai spent two years as a race queen, becoming a member of the "ZENT Sweeties" for 2010 and 2011. In 2011, she entered the Kobe Collection "One Life Model Audition" where she won the Special Jury Prize, cheered on by her teammates from the "ZENT Sweeties".

Hanai participated in the audition for the two starring roles in the movie Jellyfish in 2013 and was chosen for one of the parts from a field of more than two thousand applicants. The movie, co-starring Mio Otani, about two teenaged lesbian girls and their troubled love affair, was directed by Shusuke Kaneko and was screened at the Okinawa International Movie Festival in March 2013. The R18+ rated film was released theatrically in Japan in August 2013. When interviewed about the nudity in the film, Hanai responded "Naked is not a big deal if I want to be an actress. If I take off my clothes and can communicate something to the audience, I should do it." She also posed for the Japanese magazine Weekly Playboy as a gravure (swimsuit) model in September 2013.

Hanai's second featured movie role was also with director Shusuke Kaneko, starring as Arisa in the science fiction action film Danger Dolls, released theatrically in Japan in September 2014. Also in late 2014, she was a cast member in the Edo period TV costume drama Osoroshi (おそろし～三島屋変調百物語) broadcast as a miniseries on NHK from August to September 2014.

== Filmography ==
- Jellyfish (ジェリー・フィッシュ) (2013)
- Danger Dolls (2014)
