= Cheney Brannon =

American musician (born 1973)

- Born: April 29, 1973 (age 53)
- Genres: Alternative rock, hard rock, post-grunge, pop
- Occupation: Musician
- Instruments: Drums, percussion, vocals

Cheney Brannon (born April 29, 1973) is an American musician. He is a former drummer for the rock band Collective Soul, and has transitioned into the groups tour manager. He has previously played drums for other acts such as Cheap Thrill, Riley Biederer, John Corabi and Joel Kosche.

== Life and career ==
=== Early life and career beginnings ===
Brannon is a self-taught drum player, beginning at age 9. At age 11 he joined his first band, Chapter One. At age 18, Brannon moved to Atlanta to engage with the music scene.

=== Collective Soul ===
Brannon is credited in the liner notes of the Collective Soul album Afterwords (2007) as having played the tambourine on the track "What I Can Give You."

In October 2008, Brannon became an official member of the band, replacing then-drummer Ryan Hoyle.

During Brannon's tenure as drummer, Collective Soul performed the 2009 NFC Championship Game halftime show; recorded and released the album Collective Soul (2009), also known as Rabbit to differentiate it from the band's 1995 album of the same name; performed the song "You" on the March 16, 2010, episode of The Tonight Show with Jay Leno; re-recorded and released the single "Tremble for My Beloved" in 2010; and toured nationally and internationally from 2008 to 2011. In September 2009, Collective Soul were inducted into the Georgia Music Hall of Fame.

In January 2012, Brannon left the band to pursue other music opportunities.

== Discography ==
=== Studio albums ===
==== With Collective Soul ====
Year	Album details	Peak chart positions					Certifications (sales thresholds)
Year	Album details	US	US Ind.	AUS	CAN	NZ	Certifications (sales thresholds)
2009	Collective Soul: Released: August 25, 2009; Label: Loud & Proud; Formats: CD, DI	24	—	—	9	—	
"—" denotes a release that did not chart.

=== Singles ===
==== With Collective Soul ====
Year	Single	Peak chart positions										Certifications	Album
Year	Single	US	US Main.	US Alt.	US Adult	AUS	AUT	CAN	CAN Alt.	NZ	UK	Certifications	Album
2009	"Staring Down"	—	—	—	18	—	—	—	—	—	—		Collective Soul
2009	"Welcome All Again"	—	—	—	—	—	—	—	—	—	—		Collective Soul
2010	"You"	—	—	—	35	—	—	—	—	—	—		Collective Soul
2010	"Tremble for My Beloved (Reissue)"	—	—	—	—	—	—	—	—	—	—		Non-album single
"—" denotes a release that did not chart.

=== Other appearances ===
List of non-single guest appearances, with other performing artists, showing year released and album name
Title	Year	Other artist(s)	Album
"What I Can Give You"	2007	Collective Soul	Afterwords

== See also ==
- List of drummers
