= Akihito Yagi =

Japanese martial artist (born 1977)

Akihito Yagi (八木明人, Yagi Akihito, born April 5, 1977, in Naha, Okinawa) is a Karate master and teacher.

Akihito mastered the Meibukan Goju-Ryu style, and since 2016 serves as the Chairman of the IMGKA and head of the Hombu Dojo

== Personal life ==
Akihito is Meitatsu Yagi's son and grandson of Meitoku Yagi, the founder of Meibukan Karate

Akihito's younger brother, Akihiro Yagi also practices Karate and servers as the Vice President of IMGKA

== Acting Career ==
Akihito acted in martial arts movies. He is most famous for his role as Giryu in the 2007 movie Black Belt

Filmography

- Black Belt (2007) - Giryu
- High-Kick Girl! (2009) - Kûken
- Dancing Karate Kid (2013) - Shouhei Yonamine
