= Harry Woolman =

American stunt performer (1909–1996)

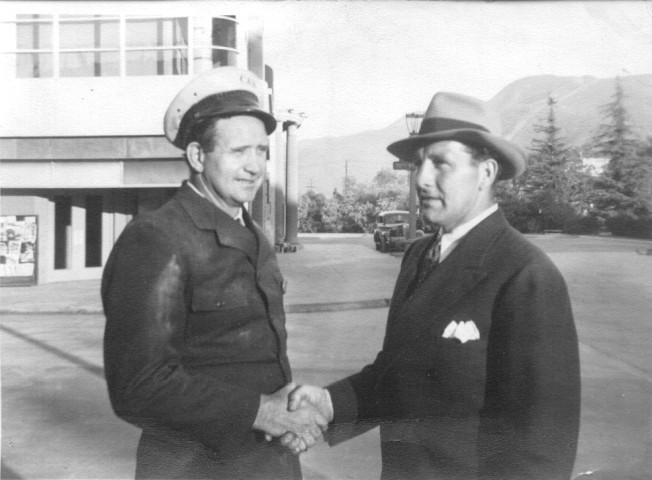
- Walter Brennan and Harry Woolman, on the set of 'These Three' (1936)
- Born: April 10, 1909; Elkton, Maryland, U.S.
- Died: October 27, 1996 (aged 87); Bellingham, Washington, U.S.
- Occupation: Television stuntman
- Years active: 1946–1986
- Spouse(s): Pauline Boulden (1936-194?) (divorced) (1 child); Alma M. Pappas (194?-1996) (his death) (2 children)

Harry Simon Woolman (April 10, 1909 – October 27, 1996) was an American race-circuit, film, and television stuntman, specializing in motorcycle jumps, car crashes, and pyrotechnics, from the 1930s through the early 1960s. From the 1960s until his retirement in the mid-1980s, he designed mechanical special effects for films and television. He also acted in bit parts over this span.

Woolman was born and raised in rural Elkton, Maryland, the "Marriage Capital" of the East Coast, where elopers would run from neighboring states for a no-wait wedding. An aspiring motorcycle daredevil, he would ride his cycle backwards or standing on his head, at the outskirts of town attracting the matrimony-bound to stop and ask for directions, when he would offer to guide them to one of the 24-hour chapels for tips. One of these clients was a Hollywood producer, down from New York City, who invited Woolman to look him up for a job if he was ever in California.

Woolman was a long-time Hollywood stuntman and special effects innovator, doubling for such notables as Clark Gable, Charles Laughton, William Bendix, and John Carradine. He also acted in occasional roles such as the motorcycle police officer in the Abbott & Costello comedy The Time of Their Lives.

Having gained practice handling cars running moonshine in rural Cecil County, Maryland, Woolman headlined as a thrill-rider on the racetrack circuit with Ed "Lucky" Teter and his Hell Drivers. Woolman survived over 3,000 head-on collisions and was featured numerous times on the television program You Asked for It, doing everything from jumping a house with a car to being blown up in a paper coffin by 20 sticks of dynamite. In 1953, he was the point-leader in the International Stuntmen's Association and a gold star driver.

From the 1960s through the early 1980s, Woolman turned to special effects, particularly gunfights and explosions. Woolman considered his recreation of the assassination of John F. Kennedy in the 1973 film Executive Action to be his magnum opus.

Despite a long career rife with hair-raising danger, Woolman died peacefully in his sleep in Bellingham, Washington, on October 27, 1996, at the age of 87.
