= Andrew Heskins =

British film critic (born 1972)

- Born: 1972 (age 53–54)
- Occupation: Film critic

Andrew Heskins (born 1972) is a British film critic. He founded the film website easternKicks in 2002 and co-founded the Focus Hong Kong film festival in 2023.

== Biography ==
Heskins was born in 1972. He was introduced to Asian cinema when he watched the Monkey TV series in the late 1970s. During the 1980s and 1990s, his interest in Asian cinema started after watching Japanese television drama and Hong Kong Shaw Brothers movies on TV. In the mid-1990s, he worked as a graphic designer for the Loss Prevention Council and became an art director at Wardour, where he worked on magazines and newsletters. In 2002, he started easternKicks, a website about Asian cinema with news, reviews, and interviews. He also wrote for the Japanese film magazine Cut. In 2012, easternKicks had grown with seven regular contributors, and Heskins kept working on it full-time while also doing freelance graphic design. He got involved with the Chinese Visual Festival to promote Asian films and has been interviewed by the BBC and The Spectator as an Asian film expert. His reviews have also been quoted in Film International. He also did commentaries for the movies The Champions and Black Mask and appeared in the Blu-ray re-releases of those films. In 2023, he co-founded the Focus Hong Kong Film Festival with the Hong Kong Economic and Trade Office, London.

== Personal life ==
Heskins lives in London with his wife. Besides movies, he is also a vinyl record collector, which was influenced by his parents. He got into acid jazz in the 1990s and started collecting records, eventually owning over 8,000 with a value of around $39,000 by 2015.
