= John Brannon (American football) =

American football player (born 1998)

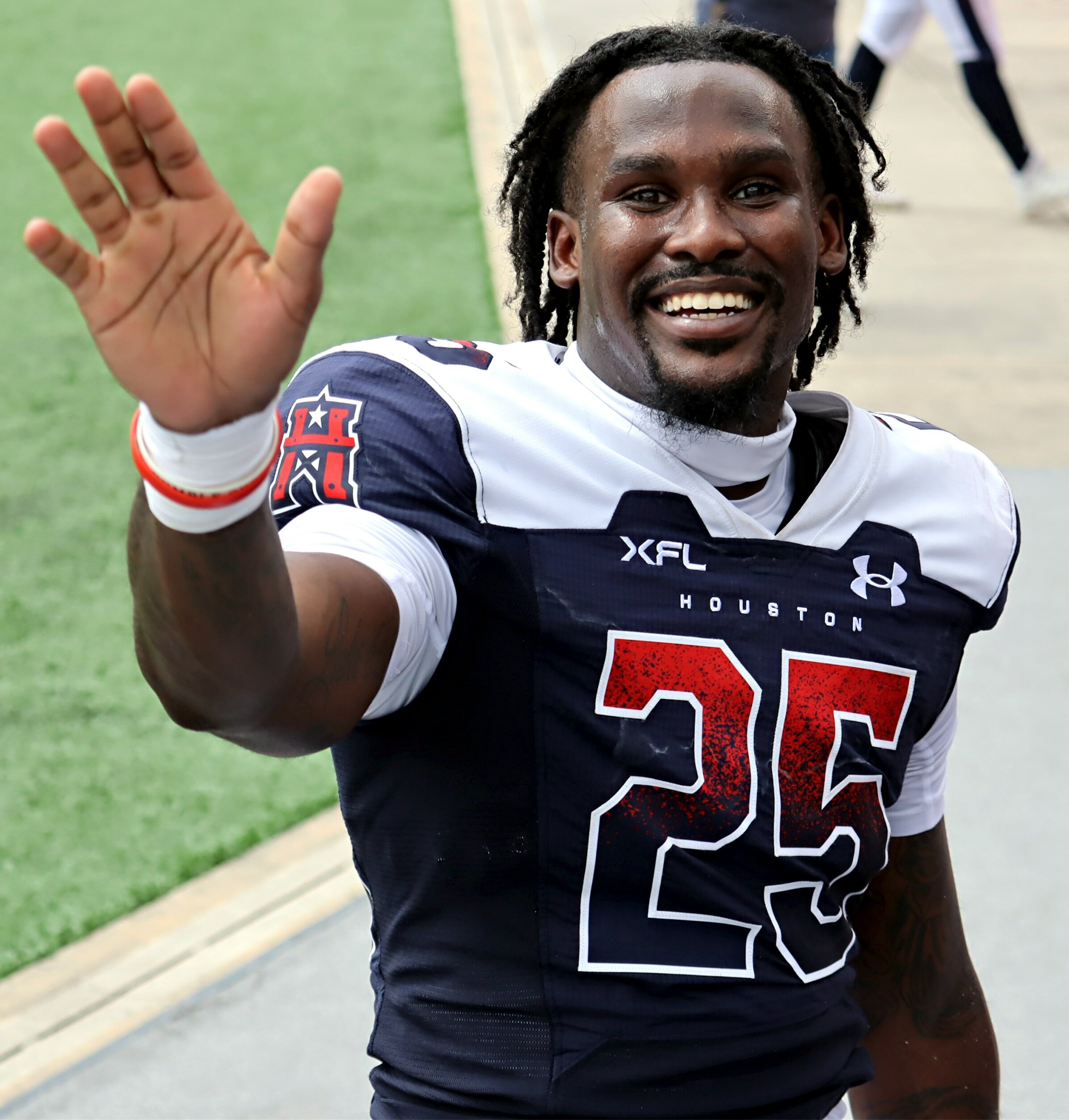
- Brannon with the Houston Roughnecks in 2023

No. 38, 25
- Position: Cornerback

Personal information
- Born: March 10, 1998 (age 28); Charlotte, North Carolina, U.S.
- Listed height: 6 ft 0 in (1.83 m)
- Listed weight: 190 lb (86 kg)

Career information
- High school: South Mecklenburg (Charlotte)
- College: Western Carolina
- NFL draft: 2020: undrafted

Career history
- Los Angeles Chargers (2020); Carolina Panthers (2021)*; Cincinnati Bengals (2021–2022)*; Houston Roughnecks (2023)
- * Offseason or practice squad member only

Career NFL statistics
- Games played: 1
- Stats at Pro Football Reference

John William Brannon III (born March 10, 1998) is an American former professional football player who was a cornerback in the National Football League (NFL). After playing college football for the Western Carolina Catamounts, he signed with the Los Angeles Chargers as an undrafted free agent in 2020.

== College career ==
Brannon played college football for the Catamounts at Western Carolina University from 2016 to 2019.

== Professional career ==
=== Los Angeles Chargers ===
Brannon signed with the Los Angeles Chargers as an undrafted free agent following the 2020 NFL draft on April 26, 2020. He was waived during final roster cuts on September 5, 2020, and signed to the team's practice squad the next day. He was elevated to the active roster on January 2, 2021, for the team's week 17 game against the Kansas City Chiefs, and reverted to the practice squad after the game. He signed a reserve/future contract with the Chargers after the season on January 5, 2021. He was waived on August 31, 2021.

=== Carolina Panthers ===
On September 7, 2021, Brannon was signed to the Carolina Panthers practice squad. He was released on September 17, 2021.

=== Cincinnati Bengals ===
On December 17, 2021, Brannon was signed to the Cincinnati Bengals practice squad.

On February 15, 2022, Brannon signed a reserve/future contract. He was waived on July 27.

=== Houston Roughnecks ===
On November 17, 2022, Brannon was selected by the Houston Roughnecks of the XFL. He was released on June 22, 2023.
