= Ed Roland discography =

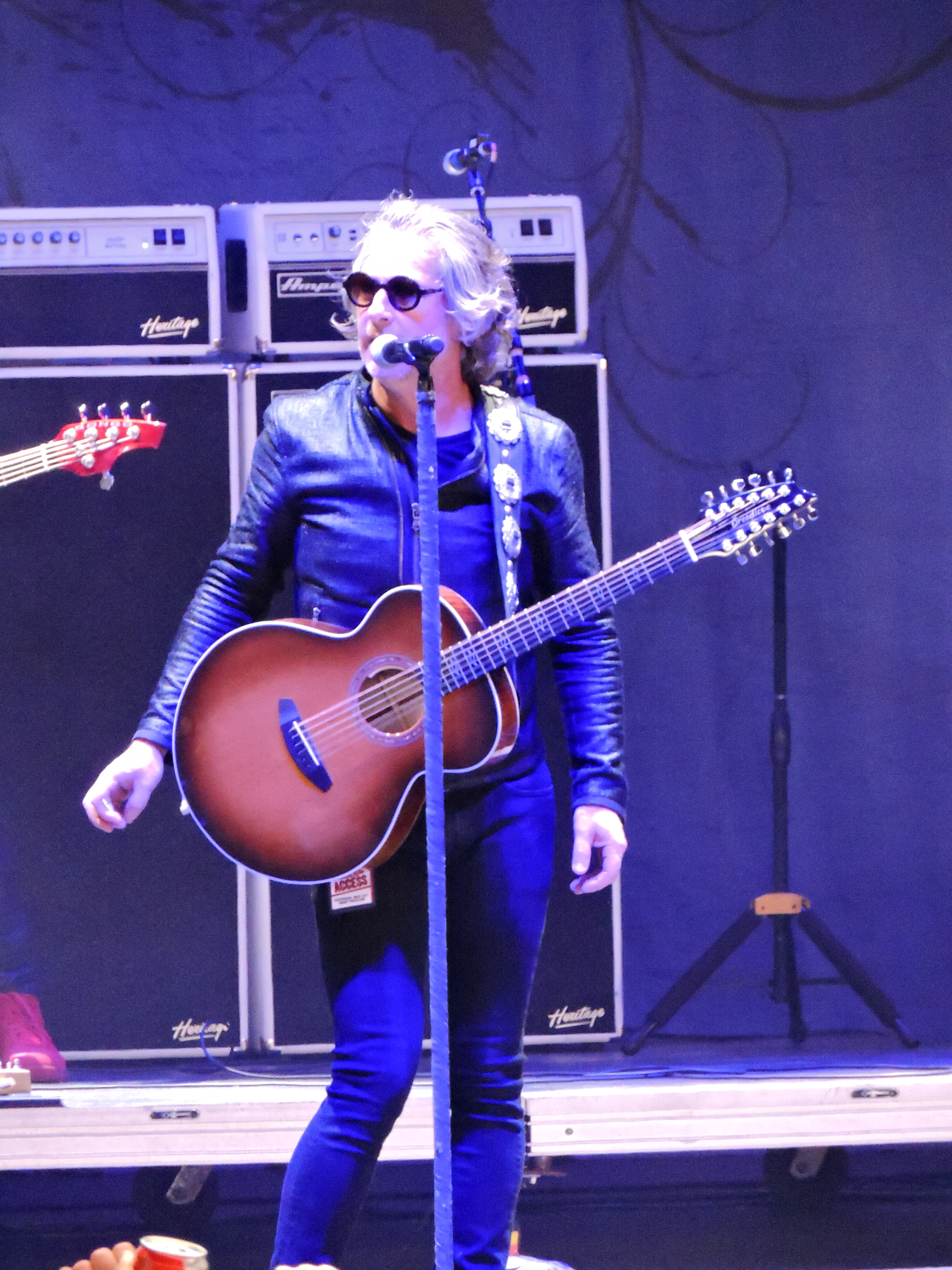
- Roland performing live with Collective Soul in 2016.
- Studio albums: 2

The discography of American musician Ed Roland consists of two studio albums as a solo artist, thirteen studio albums with Collective Soul, two studio albums with Ed Roland and the Sweet Tea Project, and one studio album with Alien Attitude.

== Studio albums ==
| Year | Title |
|---|---|
| 1991 | Ed-E Roland: Released: 1991; Label: Core; Formats: CD, CS |
| Unreleased | Anniversary |

=== With Collective Soul ===
| Year | Album details | Peak chart positions | | | | | Certifications (sales thresholds) |
| Year | Album details | US | US Ind. | AUS | CAN | NZ | Certifications (sales thresholds) |
|---|---|---|---|---|---|---|---|
| 1993 | Hints Allegations and Things Left Unsaid: Released: June 22, 1993; Label: Atlantic; Formats: CD, CS | 15 | — | 57 | 5 | 46 | US: 2× Platinum; CAN: 5× Platinum |
| 1995 | Collective Soul: Released: March 14, 1995; Label: Atlantic (#82745); Formats: CD, CS | 23 | — | 23 | 8 | 1 | US: 3× Platinum; AUS: Gold; CAN: 8× Platinum |
| 1997 | Disciplined Breakdown: Released: March 11, 1997; Label: Atlantic (#82984); Formats: CD, CS, LP | 16 | — | 37 | 5 | 3 | US: Platinum; CAN: 2× Platinum |
| 1999 | Dosage: Released: February 9, 1999; Label: Atlantic (#83162); Formats: CD, CS | 21 | — | 48 | 5 | 21 | US: Platinum; CAN: Platinum |
| 2000 | Blender: Released: October 10, 2000; Label: Atlantic (#83400); Formats: CD, CS | 22 | — | — | 3 | — | US: Gold; CAN: Gold |
| 2004 | Youth: Released: November 16, 2004; Label: El Music Group (#60001); Formats: CD | 66 | 3 | — | 30 | — | |
| 2007 | Afterwords: Released: August 28, 2007; Label: El Music Group (#660011); Formats: CD, DI | — | — | — | 23 | — | |
| 2009 | Collective Soul: Released: August 25, 2009; Label: Loud & Proud; Formats: CD, DI | 24 | — | — | 9 | — | |
| 2015 | See What You Started by Continuing: Released: October 2, 2015; Label: Vanguard; Formats: CD, DI, LP | 25 | — | — | — | — | |
| 2019 | Blood: Released: June 21, 2019; Label: Fuzze-Flex; Formats: CD, digital download, LP | — | — | — | — | — | |
| 2022 | Vibrating: Released: August 12, 2022; Label: Fuzze-Flex; Formats: CD, digital download, LP | — | — | — | — | — | |
| 2024 | Here to Eternity: Released: May 17, 2024; Label: Fuzze-Flex; Formats: CD, digital download, LP | — | — | — | — | — | |
| 2026 | Touch and Go: Released: April 18, 2026; Label: Fuzze-Flex; Formats: CD, digital download, LP | — | — | — | — | — | |
"—" denotes a release that did not chart.

=== With Ed Roland and the Sweet Tea Project ===
| Year | Title |
|---|---|
| 2013 | Devils 'n Darlins: Released: September 3, 2013; Label: 429; Formats: CD, DI |
| 2017 | Alder Lane Farm: Released: October 6, 2017; Label: Fuzze-Flex Records; Formats: CD, vinyl, DI |

=== With Alien Attitude ===
| Year | Title |
|---|---|
| 2020 | The Living Room: Released: November 27, 2020; Label: Fuzze-Flex Records; Formats: Vinyl, DI |

== Extended plays ==
=== With Collective Soul ===
| Year | EP details | US | US Ind. |
|---|---|---|---|
| 2005 | From the Ground Up: Released: May 24, 2005; Label: El Music Group (#90502); Formats: CD | 129 | 8 |
| 2020 | Half & Half: Released: October 9, 2020; Label: Fuzze-Flex Records; Format: CD, vinyl, digital download | — | — |

== Singles ==
=== With Collective Soul ===
| Year | Single | Peak chart positions | | | | | | | | | | Certifications | Album |
| Year | Single | US | US Main. | US Alt. | US Adult | AUS | AUT | CAN | CAN Alt. | NZ | UK | Certifications | Album |
|---|---|---|---|---|---|---|---|---|---|---|---|---|---|
| 1994 | "Shine" | 11 | 1 | 4 | — | 8 | 25 | 8 | — | 21 | 82 | US: Gold | Hints Allegations and Things Left Unsaid |
| 1994 | "Breathe" | — | 12 | — | — | 95 | — | 35 | — | — | — | | Hints Allegations and Things Left Unsaid |
| 1994 | "Wasting Time" | — | — | — | — | — | — | — | — | — | — | | Hints Allegations and Things Left Unsaid |
| 1995 | "Gel" | 49 | 2 | 14 | — | 52 | — | 8 | — | — | — | | Collective Soul |
| 1995 | "December" | 20 | 1 | 2 | 11 | 97 | — | 2 | 2 | 34 | — | | Collective Soul |
| 1995 | "Smashing Young Man" | — | 8 | — | — | — | — | 19 | — | — | — | | Collective Soul |
| 1995 | "The World I Know" | 19 | 1 | 6 | 18 | 41 | — | 1 | 5 | 25 | — | | Collective Soul |
| 1996 | "Where the River Flows" | — | 1 | — | — | 99 | — | — | — | — | — | | Collective Soul |
| 1997 | "Precious Declaration" | 65 | 1 | 6 | — | 81 | — | 5 | 1 | — | — | | Disciplined Breakdown |
| 1997 | "Listen" | 72 | 1 | 17 | — | — | — | 39 | 2 | — | — | | Disciplined Breakdown |
| 1997 | "Blame" | — | 11 | — | — | — | — | 25 | 5 | — | — | | Disciplined Breakdown |
| 1998 | "She Said" | — | 16 | 39 | — | — | — | 23 | 4 | — | — | | Scream 2: Music from the Dimension Motion Picture |
| 1999 | "Run" | 76 | — | 36 | 12 | 48 | — | 9 | — | — | — | | Dosage |
| 1999 | "Heavy" | 73 | 1 | 5 | — | — | — | 5 | 1 | — | — | | Dosage |
| 1999 | "No More, No Less" | 123^{[+]} | 10 | 32 | — | 67 | — | 31 | 4 | — | — | | Dosage |
| 1999 | "Tremble for My Beloved" | — | 35 | — | — | — | — | — | — | — | — | | Dosage |
| 2000 | "Why, Pt. 2" | 111^{[+]} | 2 | 19 | — | — | — | — | 3 | — | — | | Blender |
| 2001 | "Vent" | — | 34 | — | — | — | — | — | — | — | — | | Blender |
| 2001 | "Perfect Day" (featuring Elton John) | — | — | — | 29 | — | — | — | — | 13 | — | | Blender |
| 2001 | "Next Homecoming" | — | 39 | — | — | — | — | — | — | — | — | | Seven Year Itch: Greatest Hits, 1994-2001 |
| 2004 | "Counting the Days" | — | 8 | — | — | — | — | — | — | — | — | | Youth |
| 2005 | "Better Now" | 117^{[+]} | 35 | — | 9 | — | — | — | — | — | — | | Youth |
| 2005 | "How Do You Love" | — | — | — | 16 | — | — | — | — | — | — | | Youth |
| 2007 | "Hollywood" | — | — | — | 22 | — | — | 91 | — | — | — | | Afterwords |
| 2008 | "All That I Know" | — | — | — | 39 | — | — | — | — | — | — | | Afterwords |
| 2009 | "Staring Down" | — | — | — | 18 | — | — | — | — | — | — | | Collective Soul |
| 2009 | "Welcome All Again" | — | — | — | — | — | — | — | — | — | — | | Collective Soul |
| 2010 | "You" | — | — | — | 35 | — | — | — | — | — | — | | Collective Soul |
| 2010 | "Tremble for My Beloved (Reissue)" | — | — | — | — | — | — | — | — | — | — | | Non-album single |
| 2015 | "This" | — | — | — | — | — | — | — | — | — | — | | See What You Started by Continuing |
| 2015 | "AYTA" | — | — | — | — | — | — | — | — | — | — | | See What You Started by Continuing |
| 2015 | "Hurricane" | — | — | — | — | — | — | — | — | — | — | | See What You Started by Continuing |
| 2015 | "Contagious" | — | — | — | — | — | — | — | — | — | — | | See What You Started by Continuing |
"—" denotes a release that did not chart.

Notes

- + "No More, No Less", "Why, Pt. 2" and "Better Now" peaked outside of the US Billboard Hot 100 chart, therefore they are listed on the Bubbling Under Hot 100 chart.

=== With Ed Roland and the Sweet Tea Project ===
| Year | Single | Album |
|---|---|---|
| 2013 | "Love Won't Bring Us Down" | Devils 'n Darlins |

=== As featured artist ===
| Year | Single | Album |
|---|---|---|
| 2012 | "When I Wake Up" (Jen Lowe featuring Ed Roland) | Americanica |

== Other appearances ==
List of non-single guest appearances, with other performing artists, showing year released and album name
| Title | Year | Other artist(s) | Album |
|---|---|---|---|
| "Shelter from the Storm" | 2012 | Ed Roland and the Sweet Tea Project | Chimes of Freedom |
| "The World I Know" | 2012 | Pat Green | Songs We Wish We'd Written II |
| "NBA on ESPN" | 2012 | Ed Roland and the Sweet Tea Project | none |
