= Collective Soul 2013 Tour =

2013 international concert tour

2013 Tour
- Tour by Collective Soul
- Start date: April 26, 2013
- End date: November 15, 2013
- No. of shows: 14 in North America; 1 in Asia; 15 total

Collective Soul concert chronology
- 2012 Fall Tour (2012); 2013 Tour (2013); North American Winter Tour 2014 (2014)

The Collective Soul 2013 Tour was a concert tour by American rock band Collective Soul.

== Background ==
For their 2013 tour, Collective Soul performed fifteen shows total: twelve in the United States, two in Canada, and one in Indonesia. This marked the first time the band performed in Indonesia.

When they weren't touring as a band, the members of Collective Soul were involved in other projects throughout the year:

- Frontman Ed Roland toured with the Sweet Tea Project to support their debut album, Devils 'n Darlins.
- Rhythm guitarist Dean Roland, alongside Ryan Potesta, are members of Magnets & Ghosts. They embarked on the Light My Flame Tour to support their debut album, Mass.
- Bassist Will Turpin, also a solo artist, toured with his backing band, the Way. They performed a Stageit concert held at Real 2 Reel Studios in Jonesboro, Georgia on February 7. This show was recorded and later released as a live EP, The Lighthouse (Live from Real 2 Reel Studios).

== Opening acts ==
- Vertical Horizon (Paradise)

== Set list ==
Jakarta
1. "Tremble for My Beloved"
2. "Heavy"
3. "Listen"
4. "December"
5. "Gel"
6. "She Said"
7. "Why, Pt. 2"
8. "Where the River Flows"
9. "Compliment"
10. "Needs"
11. "Hollywood"
12. "Better Now"
13. "Run"
14. "Precious Declaration"
15. "The World I Know"

Encore

16. "Counting the Days"
17. "Shine"

== Tour dates ==
Date	City	Country	Venue
North America
April 26, 2013	West Wendover	United States	Peppermill Concert Hall
May 25, 2013^{[A]}	Hot Springs	United States	Timberwood Amphitheater
May 26, 2013	Laughlin	United States	E Center
Asia
June 22, 2013^{[B]}	Jakarta	Indonesia	Carnival Beach, Ancol
North America
June 27, 2013	New Buffalo	United States	Four Winds New Buffalo
June 28, 2013^{[C]}	Sterling Heights	United States	Freedom Hill County Park
July 5, 2013^{[D]}	Thunder Bay	Canada	Thunder Bay Community Auditorium
July 6, 2013	Rama	Canada	Casino Rama
July 19, 2013^{[E]}	Albany	United States	Linn County Expo Center
July 25, 2013^{[F]}	Springfield	United States	Ozark Empire Fairgrounds
September 1, 2013^{[G]}	Naperville	United States	Rotary Hill
September 6, 2013	Paradise	United States	Mandalay Beach
October 18, 2013^{[H]}	Panama City Beach	United States	Aaron Bessant Park Amphitheater
October 19, 2013^{[I]}	Richmond Hill	United States	J.F. Gregory Park
November 15, 2013	Biloxi	United States	Hard Rock Hotel and Casino

Festivals and other miscellaneous performances
^{A} This concert was part of the 2013 Magic Springs Concert Series.
^{B} This concert was part of Java Rockin'land.
^{C} This concert was part of the Stars & Stripes Festival.
^{D} This concert was part of the Thunder Bay Blues Festival.
^{E} This concert was part of the Linn County Fair.
^{F} This concert was part of the Ozark Empire Fair.
^{G} This concert was part of the Naperville Jaycees Last Fling.
^{H} This concert was part of the Panama City Beach Seafood & Music Festival.
^{I} This concert was part of the Great Ogeechee Seafood Festival.

== Personnel ==
=== Band ===
- Ed Roland – lead vocals, guitar
- Dean Roland – rhythm guitar
- Will Turpin – bass
- Joel Kosche – lead guitar
- Johnny Rabb – drums, percussion
