= See What You Started by Continuing =

Album by Collective Soul

Studio album by Collective Soul
- Released: October 2, 2015
- Recorded: February–October 2014; (Sandy Springs, Georgia)
- Genre: Alternative rock, post-grunge
- Length: 38:03
- Label: Vanguard
- Producer: Ed Roland

Collective Soul chronology
Collective Soul (2009)	See What You Started by Continuing (2015)	Blood (2019)

Singles from See What You Started by Continuing
- 1. "This" Released: July 15, 2015; 2. "AYTA" Released: August 6, 2015; 3. "Hurricane" Released: August 27, 2015; 4. "Contagious" Released: September 17, 2015

See What You Started by Continuing is the ninth studio album by American rock band Collective Soul. It was released on October 2, 2015, by Vanguard Records.

The album represents a return to the classic guitar-driven rock sound that the band were known for during the 1990s. Recording began in 2014, with newcomers Johnny Rabb and Jesse Triplett joining longtime members Ed Roland, Dean Roland and Will Turpin in the studio to create the band's first album since 2009. It became the number-one alternative album for the week of October 24, 2015.

Four singles have been released from the album: "This," "AYTA," "Hurricane", and "Contagious." The band promoted the album through the See What You Started Tour.

== Background ==
On August 25, 2009, Collective Soul released their self-titled eighth studio album, also known as Rabbit to differentiate it from the band's 1995 album of the same name.

Following the release of Rabbit, various members of Collective Soul were involved in side projects.

- Ed Roland and the Sweet Tea Project – Frontman Ed Roland formed the Sweet Tea Project in 2011 with a group of friends and musicians. Their debut studio album, Devils 'n Darlins, was released on September 3, 2013.
- Joel Kosche – The lead guitarist released his solo debut studio album, Fight Years, on June 15, 2010.
- Magnets and Ghosts – Rhythm guitarist Dean Roland, alongside Ryan Potesta, formed Magnets and Ghosts in 2010. Their debut studio album, Mass, was released on November 1, 2011. To support the album, they embarked on the Light My Flame Tour in 2013. The rock duo released an extended play, Be Born, on November 10, 2014.
- Will Turpin – The bassist released his solo debut extended play, The Lighthouse, on October 11, 2011.

In an interview with Audio Ink Radio in 2011, Turpin was asked if he foresaw Collective Soul doing a new album at any point: "Yeah, I sure do. Can't really say for sure, but there are definitely discussions going on about scheduling that, and songs have been played and started, so we've already started some creativity. But, nothing is really scheduled yet. I would think that the next six months, we'll get something going on."

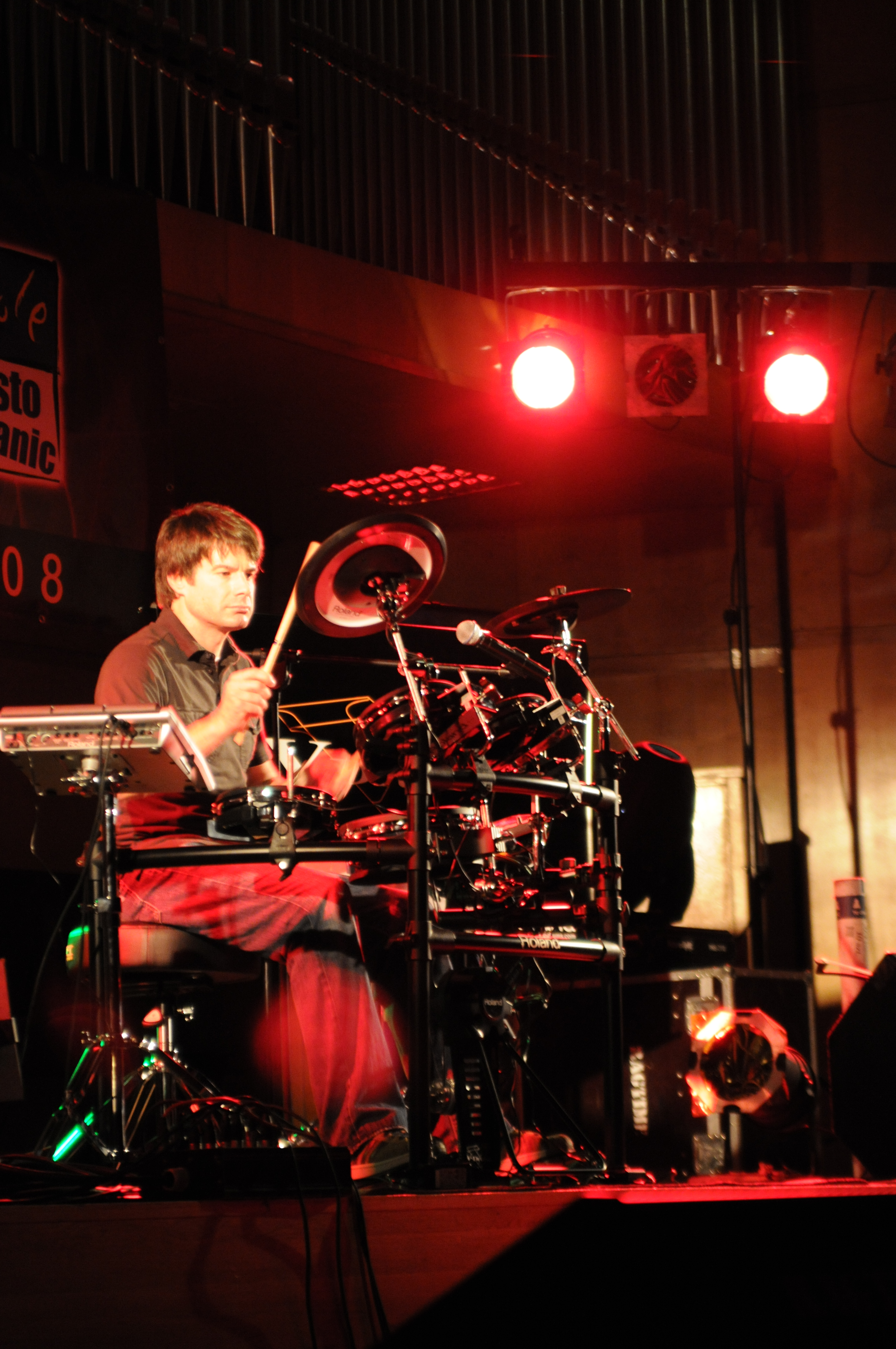
The album marks Collective Soul's first release with drummer Johnny Rabb (pictured) and lead guitarist Jesse Triplett.

In January 2012, drummer Cheney Brannon left Collective Soul to pursue other music opportunities; Johnny Rabb was later named his replacement. The band embarked on the 2012 Dosage Tour from May to July.

The band kicked off their 2014 North American winter tour on January 15 at Belly Up in Aspen, Colorado, where lead guitarist Jesse Triplett made his live debut as a member of Collective Soul. Triplett replaced Joel Kosche, who had been with the band since replacing original lead guitarist Ross Childress in 2001. On February 6, Collective Soul publicly confirmed Kosche's departure from the band: "After 13 great years, Joel Kosche has moved on in the world of music. Collective Soul welcomes Jesse Triplett as our new lead guitarist.

"As a band we have experienced and developed so much as musicians and people in the last twenty years. This album represents a full circle, coming back to the roots of Collective Soul, and continuing to build on the music that we started making from the beginning,"

— Ed Roland,
February 2014.

In February 2014, the band announced they would be releasing their ninth studio album, See What You Started by Continuing, during the summer (in the Northern Hemisphere) that year.

Throughout their 2014 touring schedule, Collective Soul road-tested songs later featured on See What You Started by Continuing.

Despite reports that the album would be released in August or September, the album was pushed back from its anticipated summer release to the following year. On September 10, Ed Roland responded to questions regarding the album's release: "First of all thanks to all of you for your patience, we are so happy you are eager to hear new tunes! We are diligently working to bring you something worth the wait. I'm finishing vocals this week and then we mix. With a realistic amount of setup time to launch we are looking at early 2015. That's the best estimate I can give you at the moment. Many thanks!"

On December 25, 2014, the band offered a sneak preview of the album by making it available for streaming on SoundCloud exclusively for Christmas Day.

Billboard exclusively premiered the album on September 25, 2015, one week ahead of its commercial release.

See What You Started by Continuing, Collective Soul's first album in six years, was released on October 2, 2015, by Vanguard Records.

== Recording ==
See What You Started by Continuing was recorded between February and October 2014 at Ed Roland's home studio in Sandy Springs, Georgia. Roland served as the album's producer. The album was mixed by Shawn Grove and mastered by Steve Rawls at Real 2 Reel Studios.

Several songs were written for the album; "Comes Back to You," "Lover Boy in the Rain," and "No Idea" were among those left off the album.

== Titling ==
The album's title was chosen by Ed Roland. "It kinda fits not only the band, but personally what we've been through over the years," Roland told Melissa Ruggieri of Access Atlanta. "Things happen and you keep moving." Roland later told Empty Lighthouse Magazine, "It's like a second wind for us it just felt like the title related to what we're doing which is getting back to doing what we love."

== Promotion ==
=== Singles ===
"This"
A 22-second sample of the opening track "This."

The lead single, "This," made its premiere on July 15, 2015, at USA Today. The band has made "This" available as a free download on their website.

The second single, "AYTA," made its premiere on August 6, 2015, via the band's YouTube channel.

The third single, "Hurricane," made its premiere on August 27, 2015, at Yahoo! Music.

The fourth single, "Contagious," made its premiere on September 17, 2015, at PopMatters.

=== Media appearances ===
Members of the band have made appearances through internet, radio, and television to support the album and its accompanying concert tour.

Date	Source	Location	Ref.
September 29, 2015	Golf Channel	Orlando, FL	
September 30, 2015	Reddit	Clearwater, FL	
October 2, 2015	HLN	Atlanta, GA	
October 13, 2015	Voice of America	Washington, D.C.	
October 14, 2015	WMMR	Philadelphia, PA	
October 16, 2015	WDHA-FM	Cedar Knolls, NJ	
October 19, 2015	WNYW	New York, NY	
October 19, 2015	HuffPost Live	New York, NY	
October 27, 2015	WTTS	Indianapolis, IN	

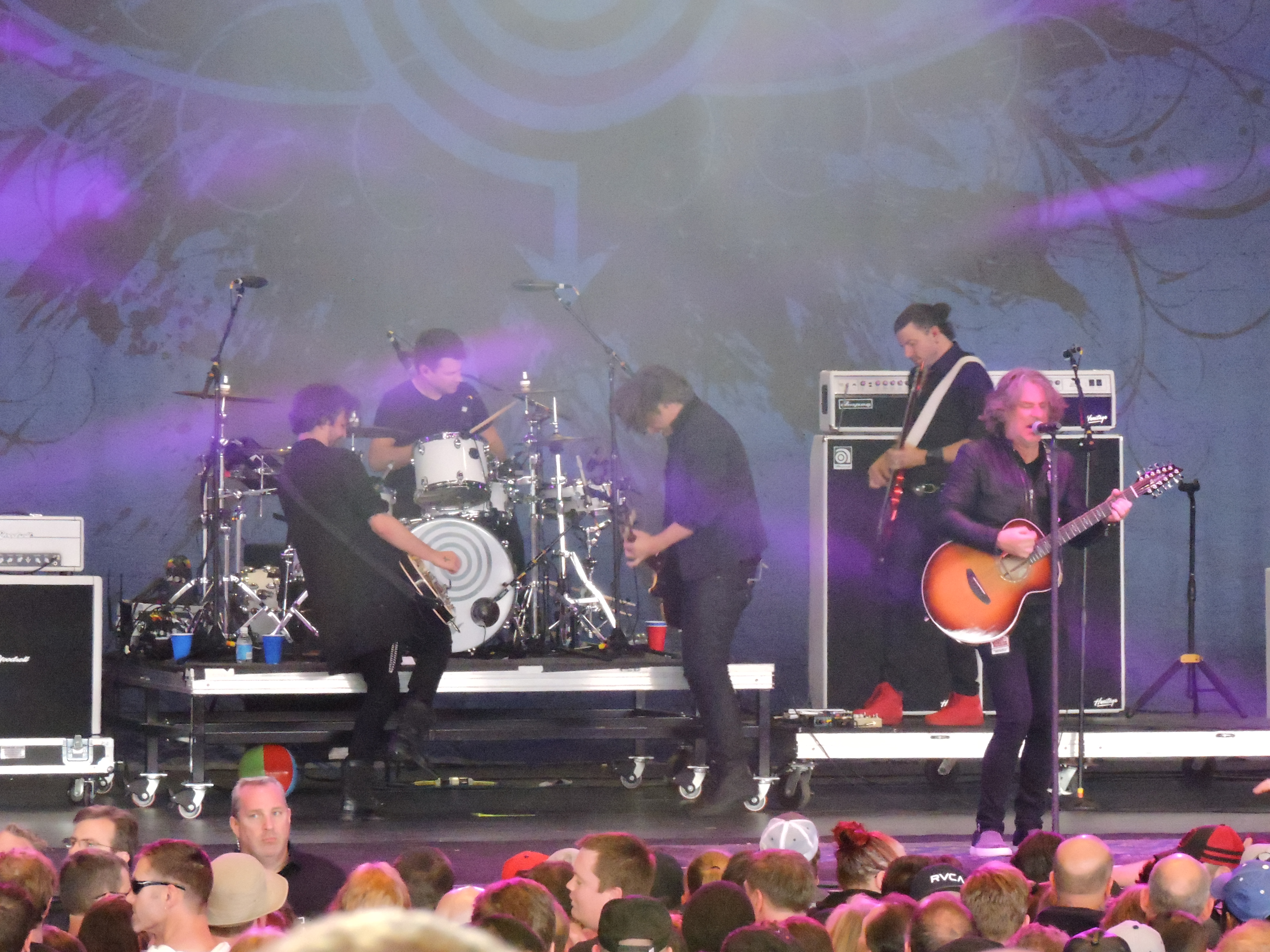
The 2016 lineup performing at the WMMR MMR*B*Q.

=== The See What You Started Tour ===
The band made a fall U.S. tour announcement through a video posted to Facebook on July 27, 2015. Tickets for most early dates went on sale to the public two days later. Four dates in South America have also been added.

=== Breedlove Guitar Cover Sweepstakes ===
The band teamed up with Breedlove Guitars to launch a guitar cover sweepstakes, encouraging fans to record guitar covers of tracks from the album and upload them to YouTube under the hashtag #CSGuitarCover. To accompany each song, Ed Roland has created videos to teach fans how to play a specific track and talk about how he wrote it.

=== Music video ===
The music video for "AYTA" made its premiere on February 18, 2016, via Vevo. Directed by Joseph Guay, the video was shot at a concert on the band's fall U.S. tour in 2015.

== Reception ==
=== Critical reception ===
Professional ratings
Review scores
Source	Rating
AllMusic	4/5 stars
Bearded Gentlemen Music	4/5
Cryptic Rock	5/5 stars
The Daily Reveille	3/5
MOARGeek	8.9/10
PopMatters	7/10 stars
Renowned For Sound	5/5 stars

See What You Started by Continuing received positive reviews from critics. Chris Geldard of FDRMX wrote that "this album could be titled How to Craft a Classic Sounding Album as Ed Roland and Collective Soul have gone back to the song style that is based on a foundation of great guitar riffs and catchy melodies that made them so popular in their early stages." Navi of Empty Lighthouse Magazine remarked that the album is "a second wind for the band and it's evident that they are taking full advantage of it, without sacrificing the roots and originality."

Tony of AnthemStatus.com summarized that the album "falls right back into the comfort of drawn-out ballads, background cooing, and light-hearted rock sure to please the current constituent of fans which is nothing more than simply fine."

=== Commercial performance ===
See What You Started by Continuing debuted at number one on the Billboard Alternative Albums chart and at number four on the Top Rock Albums chart with 14,000 copies sold in the United States, marking Collective Soul's first time topping the former chart. The album spent two weeks on the Billboard 200, peaking at number twenty-five.

== Track listing ==
All tracks are written by Ed Roland, except where indicated.

See What You Started by Continuing – Standard edition
No.	Title	Length
1.	"This"	3:20
2.	"Hurricane"	3:18
3.	"Exposed"	3:08
4.	"Confession"	3:44
5.	"AYTA (Are You The Answer)"	3:24
6.	"Contagious"	3:32
7.	"Life"	2:53
8.	"Am I Getting Through"	3:03
9.	"Memoirs of 2005"	3:41
10.	"Tradition"	3:22
11.	"Without Me"	4:40
Total length:		38:03

Greatest Hits – Walmart bonus disc
No.	Title	Writer(s)	Original album	Length
1.	"Shine"		Hints Allegations and Things Left Unsaid	5:14
2.	"Better Now"	Roland; Dexter Green	Youth	3:14
3.	"December"		Collective Soul	4:46
4.	"Counting the Days"		Youth	2:40
5.	"The World I Know"	Roland; Ross Childress	Collective Soul	4:15
6.	"Hollywood"	Roland; Joel Kosche	Afterwords	3:04
7.	"Heavy"		Dosage	2:55
8.	"How Do You Love"		Youth	4:20
9.	"All That I Know"		Afterwords	4:06
10.	"Run"		Dosage	4:33

== Personnel ==
Credits are adapted from liner notes of See What You Started by Continuing.

Collective Soul

- Johnny Rabb – drums, percussion
- Dean Roland – rhythm guitar
- Ed Roland – vocals, acoustic guitar, piano
- Jesse Triplett – lead guitar
- Will Turpin – bass

Guest musicians

- Eric Frampton – organ
- Mama Jan Smith – background vocals (tracks 1, 8, 11)
- Ebony Childs – background vocals (tracks 1, 8, 11)
- Sweet Tea Project (Christopher Alan Yates, Brian Bisky, Mike Rizzi) – background vocals (track 4)
- Rudy Vaughn – saxophone (track 8)

Artistic personnel

- Joseph Guay – photography
- Jolie Rizzi – photo editing
- NUU Group LLC – package design

Technical personnel

- Ed Roland – production
- Shawn Grove – engineering, mixing
- Greg Archilla – additional engineering, production
- Stevie Blackie – strings, string arrangement, engineering
- Anthony J. Resta – additional production, programming (tracks 1, 2, 5, 10)
- Karyadi Sutedja – recording
- Steve Rawls – mastering

== Charts ==
Chart (2015)	Peak position
US Billboard 200	25
US Top Alternative Albums (Billboard)	1
US Top Rock Albums (Billboard)	4

== Release history ==
Region	Date	Format	Edition	Label	Ref.
United States	October 2, 2015	CD	Standard; deluxe	Vanguard	
United States	May 18, 2016	LP	Standard	Vanguard	
Canada	October 9, 2015	CD	Standard	Universal Music	
Worldwide	January 15, 2016	Digital download	Standard	Vanguard	
