= See What You Started Tour =

2015–16 concert tour by Collective Soul

- Tour by Collective Soul
- Associated album: See What You Started by Continuing
- Start date: September 29, 2015
- End date: May 5, 2016
- Legs: 3
- No. of shows: 52 in North America; 4 in South America; 56 total

The See What You Started Tour was a concert tour headlined by American rock band Collective Soul, in support of their ninth studio album, See What You Started by Continuing.

== Background ==
The tour was announced by the band through a video posted to Facebook on July 27, 2015. Tickets for most early dates went on sale to the public two days later.

== Tour dates ==
List of concerts, showing date, city, country, venue, and opening act
Date	City	Country	Venue	Opening act
Leg 1 — North America
September 29, 2015	Lake Buena Vista	United States	House of Blues	Kick the Robot
September 30, 2015	Clearwater	United States	Capitol Theatre	Kick the Robot
October 1, 2015	Fort Lauderdale	United States	Revolution	Kick the Robot
October 3, 2015^{[A]}	Atlanta	United States	The Tabernacle	Kick the Robot; Kevn Kinney
October 4, 2015	Louisville	United States	Louder Than Life Fest	—N/a
October 7, 2015	Raleigh	United States	The Ritz	Kick the Robot
October 9, 2015	Charlotte	United States	The Fillmore Charlotte	Kick the Robot
October 10, 2015	Greensboro	United States	Cone Denim Entertainment Center	Kick the Robot
October 11, 2015	Munhall	United States	Carnegie of Homestead Music Hall	King Washington
October 13, 2015	Silver Spring	United States	The Fillmore Silver Spring	King Washington
October 14, 2015	Philadelphia	United States	Theatre of the Living Arts	King Washington
October 15, 2015	Huntington	United States	The Paramount	King Washington
October 17, 2015	Albany	United States	The Egg	King Washington
October 19, 2015	New York City	United States	Irving Plaza	King Washington
October 20, 2015	Boston	United States	Paradise Rock Club	King Washington
October 25, 2015	Cleveland	United States	House of Blues	King Washington
October 26, 2015	Detroit	United States	Saint Andrew's Hall	King Washington
October 27, 2015	Indianapolis	United States	Murat Shrine	King Washington
October 30, 2015	Denver	United States	Summit Music Hall	King Washington
October 31, 2015	Salt Lake City	United States	The Complex	King Washington
November 2, 2015	Boise	United States	Revolution Concert House	King Washington
November 3, 2015	Seattle	United States	Neptune Theatre	King Washington
November 4, 2015	Portland	United States	Roseland Theater	King Washington
November 6, 2015	Reno	United States	Silver Legacy Resort Casino	King Washington
November 8, 2015	Napa	United States	Uptown Theatre	King Washington
November 9, 2015	San Francisco	United States	The Fillmore	Magnets and Ghosts; Crash Magnets
November 10, 2015	San Diego	United States	House of Blues	Magnets and Ghosts
November 12, 2015	Las Vegas	United States	House of Blues	Magnets and Ghosts
November 13, 2015	Los Angeles	United States	Wiltern Theatre	Magnets and Ghosts
November 14, 2015	Riverside	United States	Riverside Municipal Auditorium	Magnets and Ghosts
November 16, 2015	Tempe	United States	The Marquee	Magnets and Ghosts
November 18, 2015	Dallas	United States	House of Blues	Magnets and Ghosts
November 20, 2015	Austin	United States	Emo's	Magnets and Ghosts
November 21, 2015	San Antonio	United States	Aztec Theatre	Magnets and Ghosts
November 22, 2015	Houston	United States	House of Blues	Magnets and Ghosts
November 24, 2015	Memphis	United States	Minglewood Hall	Ed Roland and the Sweet Tea Project
November 25, 2015	Nashville	United States	Marathon Music Works	Ed Roland and the Sweet Tea Project
November 27, 2015	Chattanooga	United States	Track 29	Ed Roland and the Sweet Tea Project
November 28, 2015	North Myrtle Beach	United States	House of Blues	Ed Roland and the Sweet Tea Project
November 29, 2015	Columbia	United States	Music Farm	Ed Roland and the Sweet Tea Project
Leg 2 — South America
December 6, 2015	Buenos Aires	Argentina	Teatro Gran Rivadavia	—N/a
December 8, 2015	Quito	Ecuador	Teleférico	—N/a
December 10, 2015	Santiago	Chile	Teatro La Cupula (Parque O'Higgins)	—N/a
December 12, 2015	Lima	Peru	Estadio Universidad San Marcos	—N/a
Leg 3 — North America
April 15, 2016	Nanaimo	Canada	Port Theatre	—N/a
April 16, 2016	Victoria	Canada	Save-On-Foods Memorial Centre	Age of Electric
April 17, 2016	Vancouver	Canada	Commodore Ballroom	—N/a
April 19, 2016	Cranbrook	Canada	Western Financial Place	—N/a
April 20, 2016	Calgary	Canada	Grey Eagle Event Centre	—N/a
April 21, 2016	Spruce Grove	Canada	TransAlta Tri Leisure Centre	—N/a
April 23, 2016	Red Deer	Canada	Red Deer Arts Centre	—N/a
April 25, 2016	Saskatoon	Canada	SaskTel Centre	—N/a
April 26, 2016	Winnipeg	Canada	Burton Cummings Theatre	—N/a
April 27, 2016	Thunder Bay	Canada	Thunder Bay Community Auditorium	—N/a
May 2, 2016	London	Canada	London Music Hall	—N/a
May 5, 2016	Toronto	Canada	Phoenix Concert Theatre	The Ascot Royals; Royal Tusk

Additional notes

- A This concert was aired live on Yahoo! Screen.

=== Rescheduled show ===
Date	City	Country	Venue	Rescheduled	Reason
October 6, 2015	Columbia	United States	Music Farm	November 29, 2015	Flash flooding

== Personnel ==
Collective Soul

- Ed Roland – lead vocals, guitar, keyboards
- Dean Roland – rhythm guitar, keyboards
- Will Turpin – bass, backing vocals
- Jesse Triplett – lead guitar
- Johnny Rabb – drums, percussion
