= Counting the Days =

Counting the Days may refer to:

- Counting the Days (EP), a 2007 EP by Marah, or the title song
- "Counting the Days" (Collective Soul song), 2004
- "Counting the Days", a song by Good Charlotte from the album Cardiology
- "Counting the Days", a song by Bic Runga from her 2002 album Beautiful Collision
- "Counting the Days" (Doctors), a 2003 television episode
