= Simple Truth =

Simple Truth or Simple Truths may refer to:

- Simple Truth, a private-label brand owned by Kroger
- The Simple Truth: A Concert for Kurdish Refugees, a 1991 fundraising concert
- The Simple Truth, a 1998 crime novel by David Baldacci
- Simple Truths (album), a 2004 album by The Holmes Brothers
- Simple Truths, a book publisher acquired by Sourcebooks

== See also ==
- These Simple Truths
