= From the Ground Up (Collective Soul EP) =

EP by Collective Soul
- Released: May 24, 2005
- Recorded: 2005
- Genre: Alternative rock, post-grunge
- Length: 34:47
- Label: El Music Group EMG 90502-2
- Producer: Zack Osdom

Collective Soul chronology
Youth (2004)	From the Ground Up (2005)	Home: A Live Concert Recording With The Atlanta Symphony Youth Orchestra (2006)

Professional ratings
Review scores
Source	Rating
AllMusic	3/5 stars

From the Ground Up is an acoustic EP by Collective Soul, released on May 24, 2005. It peaked at #129 on the Billboard 200. There is a hidden track after "Satellite" that plays at 4:15, about a minute after the song finishes.

== Track listing ==
All songs written by Ed Roland, except where noted.

1. "Compliment" (Ed Roland, Dean Roland) – 3:00
2. "Youth" – 2:56
3. "December" – 3:29
4. "Perfect to Stay" – 3:25
5. "Under Heaven's Skies" – 4:01
6. "She Said" – 4:43
7. "Counting the Days" – 3:21
8. "Satellite" – 6:52
  - "Now You've Got Me Drinkin'" (hidden track) – 2:37
