= Jason Fowler =

Jason Fowler may refer to:

- Jason Fowler (footballer) (born 1974), English former professional footballer
- Jason Fowler (musician) (born 1971), American musician
- Jason Fowler (dancer), American ballet dancer
