= Collective Soul (1995 album) =

Studio album by Collective Soul
- Released: March 14, 1995
- Studios: Criteria (Miami, Florida); Kiva (Memphis, Tennessee); Streeterville (Chicago, Illinois); Granny's (Reno, Nevada)
- Length: 46:10
- Label: Atlantic
- Producers: Ed Roland; Matt Serletic

Collective Soul chronology
Hints Allegations and Things Left Unsaid (1994)	Collective Soul (1995)	Disciplined Breakdown (1997)

Singles from Collective Soul
- 1. "Gel" Released: January 1995; 2. "December" Released: March 17, 1995; 3. "Smashing Young Man" Released: 1995; 4. "The World I Know" Released: October 23, 1995; 5. "Where the River Flows" Released: March 26, 1996

Alternative cover

Collective Soul (sometimes referred to as the Blue Album to differentiate it from the second self-titled album) is the second studio album by Collective Soul. It became the band's highest selling album to date, going Triple-Platinum, and spent 76 weeks on the Billboard 200 charts. The singles "December," "The World I Know" and "Where the River Flows" all reached No. 1 on the Mainstream Rock Tracks chart, while the first two singles also became major pop hits.

Frontman Ed Roland has considered Collective Soul the band's true debut album; Hints Allegations and Things Left Unsaid was intended more as a promotional demo and a means of acquiring a publishing contract for Roland who in 1995 noted, "It's so funny for people to compare the two. It's like comparing one band to another band. This record is our first record, flat out."

== Production ==
Amidst the surprise success of "Shine," taken from the Hints, Allegations, and Things Left Unsaid demo recordings, Collective Soul insisted on remixing the songs for a higher quality re-release. However, they were told the time required for this would drain their momentum. The band were instead convinced they could begin recording a new, sophomore effort immediately after finishing their tour schedule.

The recording and mixing of Collective Soul took five weeks, a strained scheduled due to added concerts in late December 1994 which finished on New Year's Eve. Ed Roland wrote thirty-five songs in 1994 and recorded fifteen of them in the studio. Four more were written in the studio which allowed the band to disregard eight of the previous tracks. Lead guitarist Ross Childress helped write "Simple" and "The World I Know" which was greatly encouraged by Roland who wanted a band effort in the studio.

By the time "Smashing Young Man" was being recorded, drummer Shane Evans was on vacation and unreachable. This forced the band to loop a drum sample of his from a DAT before hiring a second drummer to improve it. After many takes, Roland was also disappointed with the final version of "Bleed" but liked the song too much to remove it from the record.

Mixing was completed in the first week of February 1995; mastering was finished on a Friday with the plants opened and the album delivered the next day. The band then went to New York City for a week of publicity and photo sessions.

== Promotion and touring ==
Collective Soul opened for Van Halen during their Balance Tour which began on March 11, 1995, in Pensacola, Florida, and ended in May 1995. The band then performed at festivals in the United States before taking a break and then continuing with their own solo tour including club shows.

The band's self-titled release included five singles: "December," "The World I Know," "Where the River Flows," "Gel" and "Smashing Young Man." The three former tracks reached No. 1 on the Mainstream Rock Tracks charts and the first two became major pop hits. Music videos were also filmed for some singles and aired significantly on MTV.

== Critical reception ==
Professional ratings
Review scores
Source	Rating
AllMusic	4/5 stars
Entertainment Weekly	B
Rolling Stone	3/5 stars
The Rolling Stone Album Guide	3/5 stars

In a feat similar to its predecessor, Collective Soul received positive reviews with praise handed to its strong melodies but also indifference for an alleged lack of musical innovation. Paul Evans of Rolling Stone gave the album 3 out of 5 stars. He noted "Roland's flair for McCartneyesque melodic detail" and summed up with "the band proves it has the goods to continue to shine on brightly."

AllMusic's Tom Demalon chose "The World I Know" and "Gel" as AMG Track Picks. He, too, commended the strong melodies and stated "While not exactly ground-breaking, Collective Soul delivers the goods with a dozen, hook-laden songs for which they were awarded another multi-platinum outing."

== Track listing ==
All songs written by Ed Roland, except where noted.

No.	Title	Writer(s)	Length
1.	"Simple"	Roland, Ross Childress	3:45
2.	"Untitled"		4:01
3.	"The World I Know"	Roland, Childress	4:16
4.	"Smashing Young Man"		3:45
5.	"December"		4:45
6.	"Where the River Flows"		3:35
7.	"Gel"		3:00
8.	"She Gathers Rain"		4:31
9.	"When the Water Falls"		3:40
10.	"Collection of Goods"		4:14
11.	"Bleed"		4:03
12.	"Reunion"		2:35

Japanese bonus track
No.	Title	Writer(s)	Length
13.	"That's All Right"	Arthur Crudup	2:09

Expanded edition bonus tracks
No.	Title	Writer(s)	Length
13.	"That's All Right"	Crudup	2:09
14.	"December" (Live at the Thunderdome, St. Petersburg, FL 1995)		4:06
15.	"Where the River Flows" (Live at the Thunderdome, St. Petersburg, FL 1995)		3:41
16.	"When the Water Falls" (Acoustic) (Live)		3:40
17.	"Bleed" (Acoustic) (Live at The Peak Lounge Denver, CO, 1995)		4:02
18.	"December" (Acoustic) Live at The Peak Lounge Denver, CO, 1995)		3:25

== Personnel ==
Collective Soul:

- Ed Roland – lead vocals, guitars, producer
- Ross Childress – lead guitar, background vocals
- Dean Roland – rhythm guitar
- Will Turpin – bass, background vocals
- Shane Evans – drums

Additional musicians:

- Jackie Johnson – background vocals
- Bertram Brown – background vocals
- Becky Russell – background vocals
- Steven Sigurdson – cello
- David Chappell – viola
- Geremy Miller – violin
- John DiPuccio – violin
- Janet Clippard – contrabass
- Luis Enrique – percussion

Production:

- Matt Serletic – producer
- Greg Archilla – engineer
- Malcolm Springer – second engineer
- Bjorn Thorsrud – second engineer
- Tom Gordon – assistant engineer
- Bob Clearmountain – mixing

== Charts ==
=== Weekly charts ===
Chart (1995–96)	Peak position
Australian Albums (ARIA)	23
Canada Top Albums/CDs (RPM)	8
New Zealand Albums (RMNZ)	1
US Billboard 200	23

=== Year-end charts ===
Chart (1995)	Position
US Billboard 200	70

Chart (1996)	Position
New Zealand Albums (RMNZ)	12
US Billboard 200	75

== Certifications ==
Region	Certification	Certified units/sales
Australia (ARIA)	Gold	35,000^{^}
Canada (Music Canada)	8× Platinum	800,000^{^}
New Zealand (RMNZ)	Platinum	15,000^{^}
United States (RIAA)	3× Platinum	3,000,000^{^}
^{^} Shipments figures based on certification alone.
