= Where It's At (Holmes Brothers album) =

Studio album by the Holmes Brothers
- Released: 1991
- Genres: Soul, R&B
- Label: Rounder
- Producers: Scott Billington, Andy Breslau

The Holmes Brothers chronology
In the Spirit (1990)	Where It's At (1991)	Jubilation (1992)

Where It's At is an album by the American soul group the Holmes Brothers, released in 1991. It was the group's second album for Rounder Records.

== Production ==
The album was produced by Scott Billington and Andy Breslau. It includes covers of songs written by, among others, Hank Williams and Sam Cooke, as well as originals penned by Wendell Holmes and Paul Kelly. The album liner notes were written by Vernon Reid.

== Critical reception ==
Professional ratings
Review scores
Source	Rating
AllMusic	4/5 stars
Calgary Herald	A
The Encyclopedia of Popular Music	4/5 stars
Orlando Sentinel	3/5 stars
The Rolling Stone Album Guide	4/5 stars

The Washington Post thought that "as singers, the brothers Holmes—Wendell and Sherman—tend to go in opposite directions, taking the high and low roads as they merge soul and gospel traditions, drawing inspiration and passion from both." The Orlando Sentinel wrote that "the blend between the brothers' gritty voices and [Popsy] Dixon's celestial falsetto is pure soul."

The New York Times called the album "a strange and beguiling mixture of bar-band blues, soul, funk, gospel and country music." The St. Petersburg Times opined that "although it recalls Stax/Volt in spots, the disc is not a museum piece." Stereo Review panned the "utterly awful, ear-wrenching voice of Wendell Holmes."

== Track listing ==
No.	Title	Length
1.	"That's Where It's At"	5:38
2.	"The Love You Save"	4:09
3.	"You Can't Hold On to a Love That's Gone"	3:49
4.	"I've Been a Loser"	3:22
5.	"High Heel Sneakers"	3:40
6.	"Worried Life Blues"	3:55
7.	"Never Let Me Go"	6:40
8.	"Give It Up"	4:42
9.	"I've Been to the Well Before"	3:58
10.	"I Saw the Light"	2:38
11.	"Drown in My Own Tears"	5:05

== Personnel ==
- Willie "Popsy" Dixon – drums, vocals
- Sherman Holmes – bass, vocals
- Wendell Holmes – guitar, vocals
- Jon Cleary – keyboards
- Gib Wharton – pedal steel
- Hell's Kitchen Horns – horns
