= VH1: I Love series =

Compilation album series

The VH1: I Love series is a series of compilation albums released by Rhino Records in 2004, and spun off from the VH1 cable channel's series of I Love… programs: I Love the '70s, I Love the '80s and I Love the '90s.

Each album features 14 hit recordings from a specific decade of the late 20th century. Three albums were released, one each from the 1970s, the 1980s and the 1990s. Each album contains 14 tracks, with the songs representing stylistic trends in popular music, novelty hits, theme songs from television and movies and the most popular acts of the decade. Each album's liner notes also contain a brief capsule of popular culture trends.

A vast majority of the 42 tracks in the series reached the top 10 of the Billboard Hot 100, with 18 of those reaching No. 1.

== VH1: I Love the '70s ==
VH1: I Love the '70s

Compilation album by Various artists
- Released: June 22, 2004
- Genre: Pop rock
- Label: Rhino

Professional ratings
Review scores
Source	Rating
Allmusic	[VH1: I Love series at AllMusic link]

1. "American Woman" – The Guess Who 3:53
2. "Make It With You" – Bread 3:14
3. "American Pie" – Don McLean 8:32
4. "Theme from Shaft" – Isaac Hayes 3:17
5. "I Am Woman" – Helen Reddy 3:14
6. "Superfly" – Curtis Mayfield 3:55
7. "Free Bird" – Lynyrd Skynyrd 4:59
8. "Long Train Runnin'" – Doobie Brothers 3:27
9. "The Streak" – Ray Stevens 3:16
10. "That's the Way (I Like It)" – KC and the Sunshine Band 3:05
11. "Welcome Back" – John Sebastian 2:51
12. "Le Freak" – Chic 4:20
13. "We Are Family" – Sister Sledge 3:38
14. "Rapper's Delight" – Sugarhill Gang 5:04

== VH1: I Love the '80s ==
VH1: I Love the '80s

Compilation album by Various artists
- Released: June 22, 2004
- Genre: Pop rock
- Label: Rhino

Professional ratings
Review scores
Source	Rating
Allmusic	link

1. "My Sharona" – The Knack 4:03
2. "Turning Japanese" – The Vapors 3:44
3. "I'm Alright (Theme from Caddyshack)" – Kenny Loggins 3:49
4. "Theme from 'The Greatest American Hero' (Believe It or Not)" – Joey Scarbury 3:13
5. "Jessie's Girl" – Rick Springfield 3:14
6. "Square Pegs" – The Waitresses 3:08
7. "The Message" – Grandmaster Flash and the Furious Five 4:47
8. "Our House" – Madness 3:21
9. "Girls Just Wanna Have Fun" – Cyndi Lauper 3:52
10. "Voices Carry" – 'Til Tuesday 4:22
11. "Addicted to Love" – Robert Palmer 4:01
12. "New Sensation" – INXS 3:40
13. "Don't Worry Be Happy" – Bobby McFerrin 3:55
14. "Love Shack" – The B-52s 4:20

== VH1: I Love the '90s ==
VH1: I Love the '90s

Compilation album by Various artists
- Released: June 22, 2004
- Genre: Pop rock
- Label: Rhino

Professional ratings
Review scores
Source	Rating
Allmusic	link

1. "O.P.P." – Naughty by Nature 4:30
2. "I'm Too Sexy" – Right Said Fred 2:51
3. "To Be With You" – Mr. Big 3:29
4. "Jump Around" – House Of Pain 3:36
5. "My Lovin' (You're Never Gonna Get It)" – En Vogue 4:43
6. "Whoomp! (There It Is)" – Tag Team 4:29
7. "Shine" – Collective Soul 3:57
8. "I'll Be There for You (Theme from 'Friends')" – The Rembrandts 3:08
9. "Macarena (Bayside Boys Mix)" – Los Del Rio 3:54
10. "Say You'll Be There" – Spice Girls 3:57
11. "Tubthumping" – Chumbawamba 3:32
12. "Mmmbop" – Hanson 4:29
13. "One Week" – Barenaked Ladies 2:49
14. "Mambo No. 5 (A Little Bit Of...)" – Lou Bega 3:39
