= The Holmes Brothers =

American musical trio

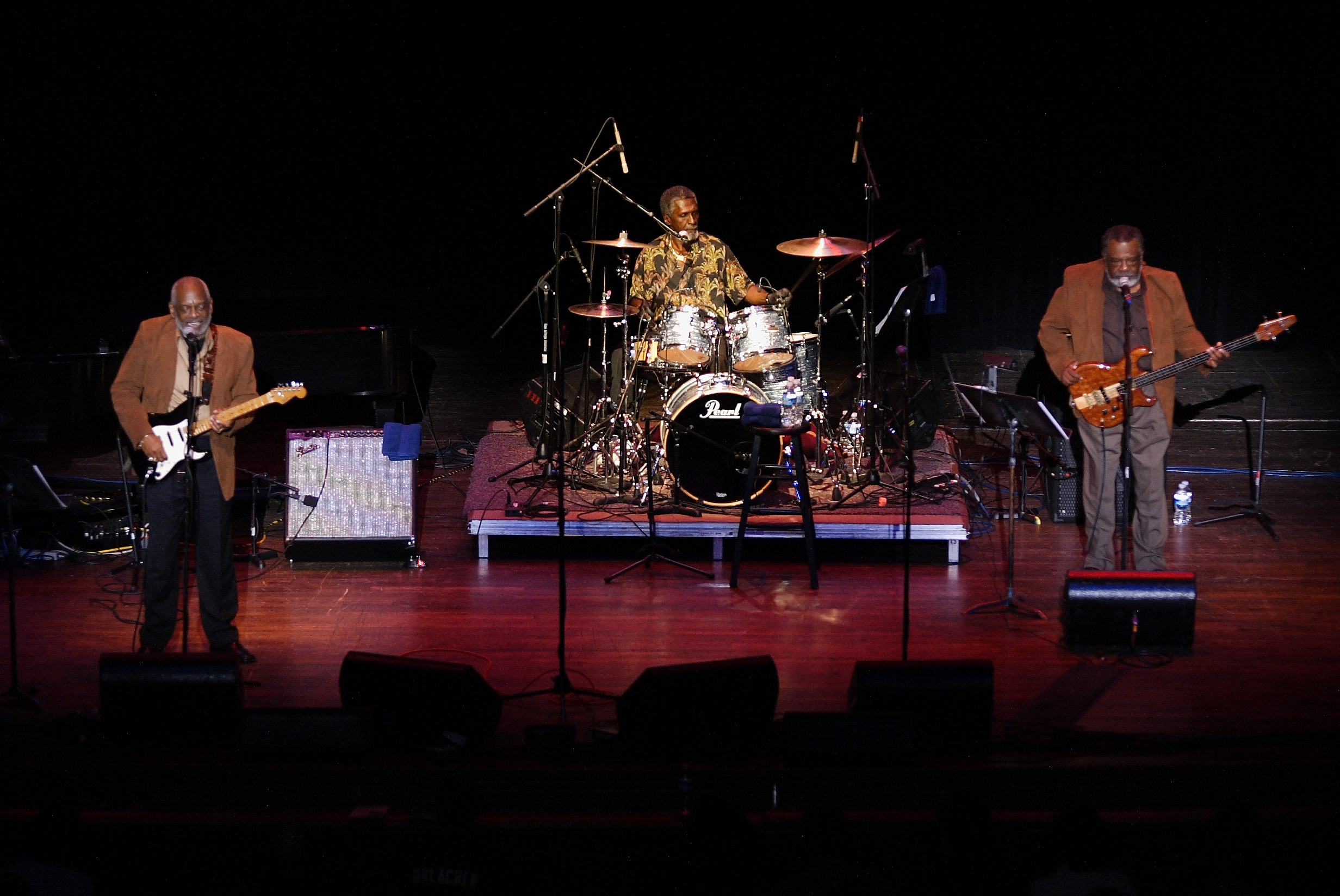
- The Holmes Brothers, at The Grand, Wilmington, Delaware, 2009

Background information
- Origin: Christchurch, Virginia; Harlem, New York
- Genres: Blues, gospel, soul, R&B, Americana
- Years active: 1978 – 2015
- Labels: Alligator, Rounder, Real World
- Past members: Sherman Holmes; Wendell Holmes; Popsy Dixon
- Website: The Holmes Brothers Official Site

The Holmes Brothers were an American musical trio originally from Christchurch, Virginia. Mixing sounds from blues, soul, gospel, country, and rhythm & blues, they have released twelve studio albums, with three reaching the top five on the Billboard Blues Albums chart. They have gained a following by playing regularly at summer folk, blues, gospel, and jazz festivals. They have recorded with Van Morrison, Peter Gabriel, Odetta, Phoebe Snow, Willie Nelson, Freddie Roulette, Rosanne Cash, Levon Helm and Joan Osborne, and have gigged all over the world—including performing for President Bill Clinton. They won the Blues Music Award from the Memphis-based Blues Foundation for Band of the Year in 2005 and for the Soul Blues Album of the Year in 2008.

USA Today calls the Holmes Brothers' music "Rootsy R&B, gospel and country. They are glorious, full of soul and surprises." The New Yorker says, "The Holmes Brothers are capable of awesome achievements." National Public Radio adds, "Their voices are rough enough for a juke joint and smooth enough for church."

== Biography ==
Sherman and Wendell Holmes were born and raised in Christchurch, Virginia. Their schoolteacher parents fostered the boys' early interest in music as they listened to traditional Baptist hymns, anthems and spirituals as well as blues music by Jimmy Reed, Junior Parker and B.B. King. They both sang in the church choir. Sherman studied clarinet and piano before taking up the bass, while Wendell learned trumpet, organ and guitar. Sherman studied composition and music theory at Virginia State University, but in 1959, he dropped out and headed to New York for a job playing with singer Jimmy Jones (of "Handy Man" fame). His younger brother Wendell joined him after completing high school. The two brothers played in a few bands before forming The Sevilles in 1963. The group lasted only three years, but they often backed up touring blues and soul acts such as artists like The Impressions, John Lee Hooker and Jerry Butler, gaining experience. After The Sevilles disbanded, Sherman, Wendell and a fellow Virginian, drummer Popsy Dixon, continued to play in a variety of Top 40 bar bands. Wendell also toured with Inez and Charlie Foxx ("Mockingbird") until 1979.

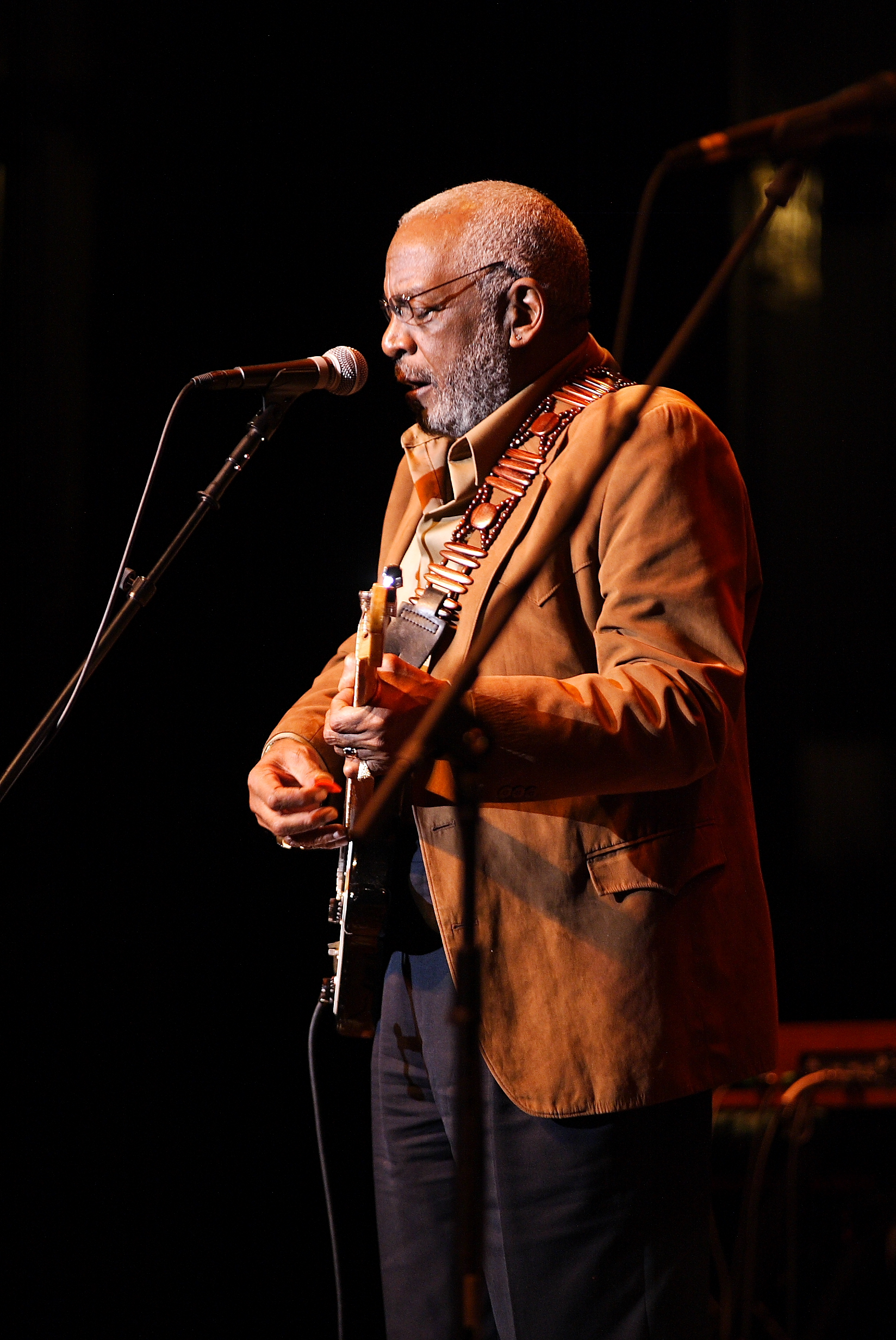
Wendell Holmes, 2008

Sherman, Wendell, and Popsy convened in the form of a new group known as the Holmes Brothers in 1979. The three shared vocals (some solo and some in gospel-inspired harmony), with Sherman playing bass, Wendell on guitar and piano, and Popsy on drums. The band frequently played with additional musicians as well. The trio moved from their hometown of Christchurch, Virginia to Harlem where they regularly performed at blues clubs, most notably Dan Lynch's, a center of the local New York City blues scene. Here the Holmes Brothers formed working relationships with future blues/folk stars such as Joan Osborne and members of Blues Traveler.

The group signed with Rounder Records in 1989 and released their first album, In the Spirit, the following year. Four subsequent albums would be recorded for the label. In 1992, the Holmes Brothers were signed to Peter Gabriel's Real World Records as the first American act on the prestigious world music label. In the mid-1990s the group performed with Van Morrison and recorded the soundtrack to the independent film Lotto Land, in which they also starred. In 1997, they were hired by Joan Osborne as her backing band for a tour supporting Bob Dylan. In 1998 the trio accompanied Freddie Roulette on his album Spirit of Steel.

In 2001, the Holmes Brothers signed with Alligator Records. Their first album for the label was the critically acclaimed Speaking in Tongues, produced by Joan Osborne. Greg Kot of the Chicago Tribune called it a "joyous, foot-stomping carnival…a gift to the world of music." The Chicago Sun-Times called it, "A Breathtaking and heartfelt journey through gospel-drenched soul, blues, funk and country." The Holmes Brothers appeared on television on the Late Show with David Letterman and The CBS Saturday Early Show, as well as on NPR's Weekend Edition, A Prairie Home Companion and Mountain Stage. In addition, The Holmes Brothers appeared on the M.C. Records tribute to Sister Rosetta Tharpe, Shout, Sister, Shout, backing Joan Osborne, Odella, Victoria Williams and Phoebe Snow.

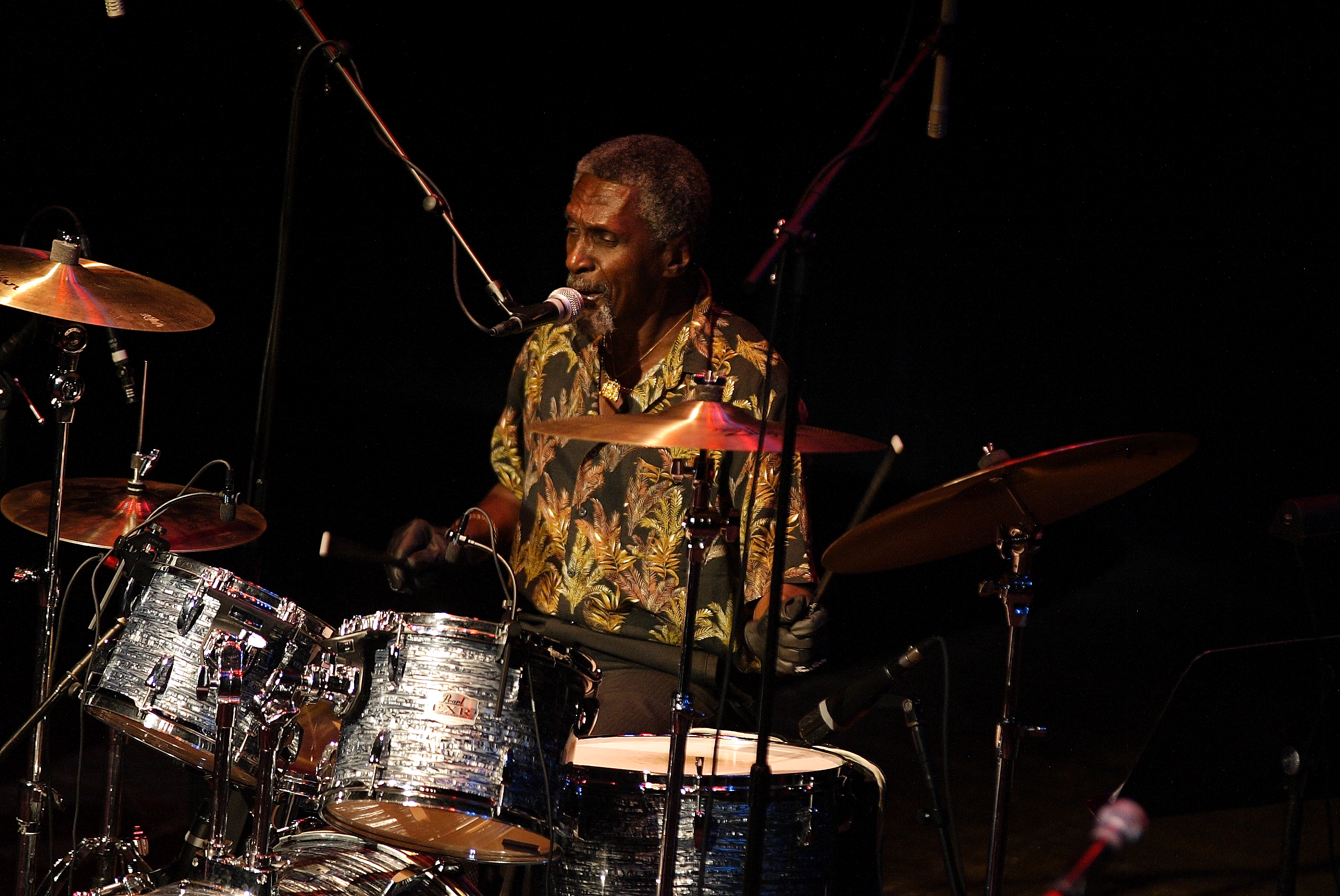
Popsy Dixon at the Drum kit, 2008

In 2003 the group recorded two songs for the soundtrack album for the TV series Crossing Jordan. Also in 2003, Peter Gabriel released the single "Burn You Up, Burn You Down" featuring backing vocals by The Holmes Brothers, although the song had been recorded a decade earlier.

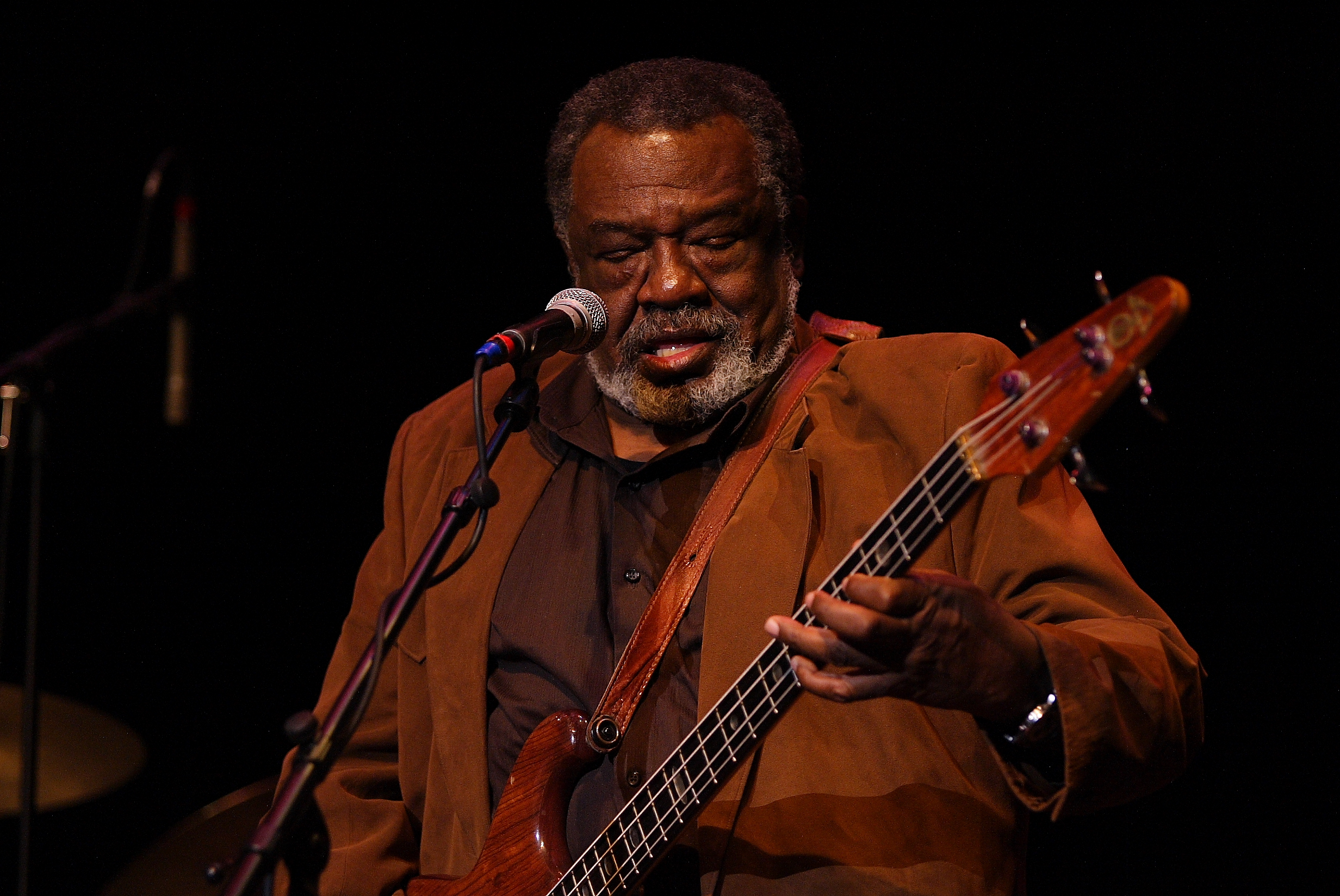
Sherman Holmes, bassist for the Holmes Brothers

Following their next album for Alligator, Simple Truths, they appeared on Outlaws And Angels—The Willie Nelson and Friends 3rd Annual Birthday Concert (televised on USA Network and released on CD and DVD), Late Night with Conan O'Brien, World Cafe, Mountain Stage, as well as the nationally broadcast NPR programs All Things Considered, On Point, and Here And Now. The albums Simple Truths and State of Grace became the first two Holmes Brothers albums to reach the Billboard charts, with both reaching the top five of the Blues Albums chart. After the release of State of Grace, the band again performed on Late Night with Conan O'Brien. Features and reviews ran in USA Today, The New York Times, Billboard, Time Out New York, Rolling Stone, The New Yorker and many other publications. State of Grace won the Blues Music Award for Soul Blues Album of the Year. Reviewer David Fricke of Rolling Stone called the album "impressive, fervent country soul."

On March 2, 2010, the brothers released the album Feed My Soul, which was inspired in part by Wendell's bout with cancer. That album was followed by 2013's Brotherhood. The album was described in Living Blues magazine, which said, "Brotherhood is as soulful and alive as the Holmes Brothers performances and is a superior, award-worthy outing...sweet sounds from the beginning of American rock 'n' roll, African American southern gospel, and agonizingly beautiful, layered soul-baring harmonies, Jimmy Red blues lumps, string squeezing, moving bass lines, strong backbeats, NOLA second-line rhythms, street corner doo-wop and the twangy heartbreak of country. The rich interplay of all this music is what makes the Holmes Brothers a national treasure." In 2014, The Holmes Brothers received an NEA National Heritage Fellowship, the highest honor bestowed upon traditional artists.

Popsy Dixon died of bladder cancer on January 9, 2015. Wendell Holmes died on June 19, 2015, from complications due to pulmonary hypertension. As of 2021, Sherman Holmes, the sole surviving member of the band, resides in Saluda, Virginia.

== Discography ==
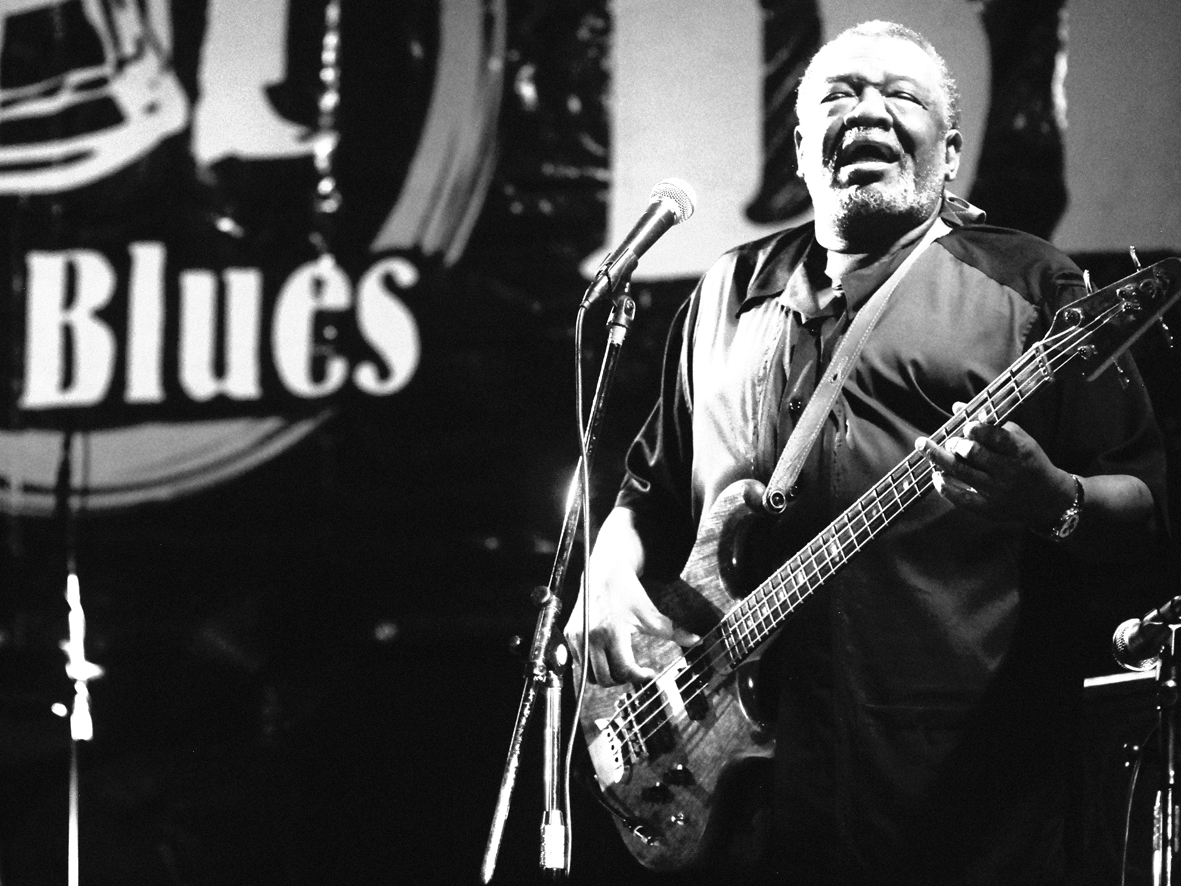
The Holmes Brothers live at Liri Blues 2009

- 1990 In the Spirit (Rounder)
- 1991 Where It's At (Rounder)
- 1992 Jubilation (Real World Records)
- 1993 Soul Street (Rounder)
- 1996 Lotto Land (Stony Plain Music)
- 1997 Promised Land (Rounder)
- 2001 Speaking in Tongues (Alligator)
- 2002 Righteous: The Essential Collection (Rounder)
- 2004 Simple Truths (Alligator)
- 2007 State of Grace (Alligator)
- 2010 Feed My Soul (Alligator)
- 2014 Brotherhood (Alligator)
