= Smashing Young Man =

Single by Collective Soul

from the album Collective Soul
- Released: 1995
- Recorded: Late 1994; Miami, Florida (Criteria Studios)
- Genre: Post-grunge
- Length: 3:45
- Label: Atlantic
- Songwriter(s): Ed Roland
- Producer(s): Ed Roland; Matt Serletic

Collective Soul singles chronology
"December" (1995)	"Smashing Young Man" (1995)	"The World I Know" (1995)

Music video
- "Smashing Young Man" on YouTube

"Smashing Young Man" is a song by American alternative rock band Collective Soul. It is the third single from their second studio album Collective Soul. The song was rumored to have been written as an insult to Smashing Pumpkins lead singer, Billy Corgan, who accused Collective Soul of plagiarizing music.

== Track listing ==
1. "Smashing Young Man" — 3:45
2. "December" (Acoustic live track) — 3:25
3. "Bleed" (Acoustic live track) — 4:02

== Charts ==
Chart (1995)	Peak position
Canadian RPM Singles Chart	19
Quebec Airplay (ADISQ)	49
U.S. Billboard Album Rock Tracks	8
