= Hints Allegations and Things Left Unsaid =

Studio album by Collective Soul
- Released: 1993 (original Rising Storm release); March 22, 1994 (Atlantic re-release)
- Recorded: 1992, 1993
- Studios: Rising Storm Studios, Atlanta, Georgia; MSE Studios, Miami, Florida; Real 2 Reel Studios, Stockbridge, Georgia
- Genre: Grunge
- Length: 45:13
- Labels: Rising Storm, Atlantic
- Producers: Ed Roland, Matt Serletic, Joe Randolph

Collective Soul chronology
Hints Allegations and Things Left Unsaid (1993)	Collective Soul (1995)

Singles from Hints Allegations and Things Left Unsaid
- 1. "Shine" Released: March 8, 1994; 2. "Breathe" Released: 1994; 3. "Wasting Time" Released: 1994

Hints Allegations and Things Left Unsaid is the debut studio album by American rock band Collective Soul. It was originally released on the band's self-owned label called Rising Storm Records in 1993. Collective Soul later signed on with Atlantic Records, and the album was re-released in 1994 under the Atlantic label. The track "Shine" gained the band attention thanks to college radio.

The cover art is a modified version of an advertising image from the 19th century, with the text on the sign changed.

== Background and release ==
Hints Allegations and Things Left Unsaid was recorded in a basement in 1992 as a promotional demo. Frontman Ed Roland hoped to simply sell the songs to a publishing company rather than form a band. He gave the demo to a small college radio station in Atlanta that began playing "Shine". The track quickly became their most requested song and the band was asked to perform some concerts for the station. Favoring an opportunity to perform a few shows with his brother, Roland agreed and regathered the demo's guitarist (Ross Childress) and drummer (Shane Evans) as well as his brother Dean. On the original Rising Storm pressing of the album, David Neal is credited as bassist. He would eventually be replaced by Will Turpin.

Prior to Collective Soul, Ed Roland had performed in the band Marching Two-Step alongside Evans. In order to make Hints Allegations and Things Left Unsaid feel more like a "band effort", three songs that were conceived during the Marching Two-Step era were included on the album: "Goodnight Good Guy", "Love Lifted Me", and "Scream". The album was essentially self-released by the band, as Rising Storm Records was simply a moniker used by the band and their manager Bill Richardson.

The attention gained by "Shine" allowed it to chart and catapulted the band to national stardom. They were soon picked up by Atlantic Records who wished to release the demo as the debut studio album of Collective Soul. In a 1995 interview, Roland elaborated on his mixed feelings regarding the situation:

"It wasn't even remixed. It was the same demo. Before we got signed we'd already charted with 'Shine.' Once we got signed I said, 'We want to re-record. This is not a band recording.' But they said, 'You're gonna lose momentum. You're looking at a three to five month process. So let's go with it and you can get your next record out quick.' We thought it would be great to sell 10-20,000 units. [When it went gold], we were sitting there with our eyes wide open."

Consequently, Collective Soul would regard their self-titled 1995 studio album under Atlantic as the band's official debut. Roland told Metal Edge, "It's so funny for people to compare the two. It's like comparing one band to another band. [Collective Soul] is our first record, flat out."

The album was produced by Matt Serletic, becoming his first production success, and who would then subsequently go on to much wider fame producing all of Matchbox 20's releases as well as those by their frontman Rob Thomas, including his Santana collaboration "Smooth".

== Promotion and touring ==
Hints Allegations and Things Left Unsaid featured three singles, the most successful of which was "Shine". Aside from radio popularity, the song also had a music video which received heavy airplay on MTV. The follow-up single, "Breathe", moderately charted in the US as well.

Collective Soul performed at Woodstock 1994 and opened for Aerosmith during their Get a Grip Tour.

== Reception ==
Professional ratings
Review scores
Source	Rating
AllMusic	3/5 stars
Entertainment Weekly	B+
The Rolling Stone Album Guide	2.5/5 stars
The Village Voice	C−

The album gained overall positive reception from critics. It was given credit for its strong melodies but a less savory response regarding its apparent lack of originality. Also of note was Collective Soul's more upbeat sound amidst their more angst, grunge-influenced contemporaries.

Chuck Eddy of Entertainment Weekly gave a somewhat sarcastic review, describing the album as "bubble-gum grunge: an idea whose time has come."

In The Village Voice, Robert Christgau was even more negative, singling it out in Consumers Guide "Turkey Shoot" feature as a "Must to Avoid", an example of "...mediocre pseudoalternatives from every corner of this embittered, all too grateful land of ours."

== Track listing ==
All songs written by Ed Roland, except "Beautiful World" by Ed Roland and Matt Serletic.

No.	Title	Length
1.	"Shine"	5:05
2.	"Goodnight, Good Guy"	3:35
3.	"Wasting Time"	3:27
4.	"Sister Don't Cry"	3:52
5.	"Love Lifted Me"	3:48
6.	"In a Moment"	3:53
7.	"Heaven's Already Here"	2:13
8.	"Pretty Donna"	1:58
9.	"Reach"	4:21
10.	"Breathe"	3:03
11.	"Scream"	3:00
12.	"Burning Bridges"	3:36
13.	"All"	3:29
14.	"Beautiful World" (Only featured on original 1993 Rising Storm release)	3:39

== Personnel ==
Collective Soul

- Ed Roland – lead vocals, guitar
- Dean Roland – rhythm guitar
- Ross Childress – lead guitar, backing vocals
- Will Turpin – bass, backing vocals (credited on the Atlantic pressing, but he doesn't play bass); percussion on "Heaven's Already Here" (Rising Storm pressing)
- Shane Evans – drums
- David Neal – bass (credited only on the Rising Storm pressing)

Additional musicians

- Matt Serletic – keyboards, trombones and string arrangements on "Sister Don't Cry", "Pretty Donna", and "Beautiful World"
- Joe Randolph – guitar on "Goodnight, Good Guy", "Love Lifted Me", and "Scream"
- Brian Howell – bass on "Scream"
- Melissa Ortega – solo violin on "Wasting Time"

String ensemble

- Jun-Ching Lin – leader, violin I
- David Braitberg – violin II
- Paul Murphy – viola
- Daniel Laufer – cello

Production

- Ed Roland – producer, mixer, and engineer (all tracks)
- Matthew Serletic – producer, mixer, and engineer (tracks 4, 8, 10, 14); mastering
- Joe Randolph – producer (tracks 5, 11)
- Bill Richardson – executive producer
- Mike Childers – digital editing, artwork, DTP
- Mario Castellanos – photography

== Charts ==
=== Weekly charts ===
Chart (1994)	Peak position
Australian Albums (ARIA)	57
Canada Top Albums/CDs (RPM)	5
New Zealand Albums (RMNZ)	46
US Billboard 200	15
US Heatseekers Albums (Billboard)	3

=== Year-end charts ===
Chart (1994)	Position
US Billboard 200	68

== Certifications ==
Region	Certification	Certified units/sales
Canada (Music Canada)	5× Platinum	500,000^{^}
United States (RIAA)	2× Platinum	2,000,000^{^}
^{^} Shipments figures based on certification alone.
