= Where the River Flows =

1995 single by Collective Soul

- Australian CD single artwork

Single by Collective Soul

from the album Collective Soul
- B-side: "Simple" (live); "Breathe" (live)
- Released: March 1996
- Studio: Criteria (Miami, Florida)
- Length: 3:35
- Label: Atlantic
- Songwriter: Ed Roland
- Producers: Ed Roland; Matt Serletic

Collective Soul singles chronology
"The World I Know" (1995)	"Where the River Flows" (1996)	"Precious Declaration" (1997)

"Where the River Flows" is a song by American rock band Collective Soul, appearing on the band's 1995 eponymous album. The song was released as the fifth and final single from the album. "Where the River Flows" peaked at number one on the US Billboard Mainstream Rock Tracks chart, becoming the band's fourth single to do so. The song became a top-40 hit in Canada, peaking at number 39 on the RPM 100 Hit Tracks chart.

== Track listing ==
Australian CD single
No.	Title	Length
1.	"Where the River Flows"	3:33
2.	"Simple" (live)	3:04
3.	"Breathe" (live)	3:24

== Charts ==
=== Weekly charts ===
Weekly chart performance for "Where the River Flows"
Chart (1996)	Peak position
Australia (ARIA)	99
Canada Top Singles (RPM)	39
Quebec Airplay (ADISQ)	21
US Mainstream Rock (Billboard)	1

=== Year-end charts ===
Year-end chart performance for "Where the River Flows"
Chart (1996)	Position
US Mainstream Rock Tracks (Billboard)	12
