= Simple Truths (album) =

Studio album by the Holmes Brothers
- Released: 2004
- Recorded: Sunset Sound Factory
- Genres: R&B, soul
- Length: 51:00
- Label: Alligator
- Producer: Craig Street

The Holmes Brothers chronology
Speaking in Tongues (2001)	Simple Truths (2004)	State of Grace (2007)

Simple Truths is an album by the American musical trio the Holmes Brothers, released in 2004. The trio supported the album with a North American tour.

== Production ==
Recorded in four days, the album was produced by Craig Street. Greg Leisz played steel guitar on several tracks; Patrick Warren played pump organ. The trio's cover of "Shine" was inspired by the Dolly Parton version. The Holmes Brothers choose their cover versions based on the lyrics of the songs. Four of the album's songs were written by the trio.

== Critical reception ==
Professional ratings
Review scores
Source	Rating
The Age	5/5 stars
AllMusic	4.5/5 stars
Leader-Post	4/5 stars
USA Today	3.5/4 stars

Entertainment Weekly wrote that the cover of "I'm So Lonesome I Could Cry" "sizzles in the grease of a fuzz-tone guitar." The Leader-Post concluded that the Holmes Brothers "find the hallowed middle ground between the glory of stately gospel like that of the Blind Boys of Alabama and the rough-and-tumble blues of artists like T-Model Ford." Mother Jones praised the "breathtaking, churchy version" of Townes Van Zandt's "If I Needed You".

The Orlando Sentinel stated that "the music kicks, the singing is a classic mix of gravel and honey, and the material is outstanding." Billboard deemed Simple Truths "another sublime release spotlighting the trio's gospelized harmonizing, punchy instrumental interplay and effervescent eclecticism." USA Today wrote that, "with their born-again harmonies and lissome guitars, veteran blues trio the Holmes Brothers make even Bruce Channel's 'Hey Baby' and Collective Soul's 'Shine' sound as if they were fashioned out of rich Delta loam."

AllMusic opined that "Wendell's 'We Meet, We Part, We Remember' is the greatest pure soul tune recorded thus far in the 21st century."

== Track listing ==
No.	Title	Writer(s)	Length
1.	"Run Myself Out of Town" (Lead vocal: Wendell)	Wendell Holmes	3:26
2.	"Shine" (Lead vocal: Wendell Holmes, with Sherman and Popsy)	Ed Roland	3:11
3.	"We Meet, We Part, We Remember" (Lead vocal: Wendell)	Wendell Holmes	3:55
4.	"If I Needed You" (Lead vocal: Sherman with Popsy)	Townes Van Zandt	3:39
5.	"Hey Baby" (Lead vocal: Sherman)	Bruce Channel, Margaret Cobb	3:59
6.	"I'm So Lonesome I Could Cry" (Lead vocal: Wendell)	Hank Williams	4:49
7.	"Everything Is Free" (Lead vocal: Popsy)	David Rawlings, Gillian Welch	5:06
8.	"Big Boss Man" (Lead vocal: Wendell)	Luther Dixon, Al Smith	2:51
9.	"Opportunity to Cry" (Lead vocal: Wendell)	Willie Nelson	3:35
10.	"Concrete Jungle" (Lead vocal: Popsy)	Bob Marley	5:24
11.	"You Won't Be Living Here Anymore" (Lead vocal: Wendell)	Wendell Holmes	3:07
12.	"He'll Have to Go" (Lead vocal: Wendell, Sherman, Popsy)	Audrey Allison, Jerry Allison, Joe Allison	2:59
13.	"I'm So Lonely" (Lead vocal: Sherman)	Sherman Holmes	4:38

== Personnel ==
- Sherman Holmes – vocals, bass
- Popsy Dixon – vocals, drums
- Wendell Holmes – vocals, acoustic guitar, electric guitar, piano
- Chris Bruce – acoustic guitar, electric guitar
- David Piltch – upright bass
- Patrick Warren – organ
- Greg Leisz – lap steel guitar, acoustic guitar
