= Gel (song) =

1995 single by Collective Soul

Single by Collective Soul

from the album Collective Soul
- Released: January 1995
- Studio: Criteria (Miami, Florida)
- Genre: Hard rock
- Length: 2:58
- Label: Atlantic
- Songwriter: Ed Roland
- Producers: Ed Roland; Matt Serletic

Collective Soul singles chronology
| "Wasting Time" (1994) | "Gel" (1995) | "December" (1995) |

Music video
- "Gel" on YouTube

"Gel" is a song by American alternative rock band Collective Soul. It served as the lead single from their 1995 eponymous album and was serviced to US radio in January 1995. Written by singer and guitarist Ed Roland, "Gel" reached number two on the US Billboard Album Rock Tracks chart, number 14 on the Modern Rock Tracks chart, and number 49 on the Hot 100 Airplay chart. Internationally, the song reached number eight in Canada and number 52 in Australia. Aside from the single's radio success, "Gel" was also featured in the 1995 comedy film The Jerky Boys and its eponymous soundtrack.

== Overview and composition ==
"Gel" is a hard rock song in 4/4 time in the key of B major with a tempo of 143 BPM. The band's rhythm guitarist, Dean Roland, said about the single, "We put what they call a 'bridge track' with the song 'Gel' off that record on The Jerky Boys soundtrack, which was huge at the time. That song kind of connected us from the first record to the second, and then it went into 'December', 'The World I Know', and the rest has been history."

== Critical reception ==
"Gel" experienced great success with fans, radio stations, critics, and TV networks. AllMusic's Tom Demalon chose "Gel" as one of his AMG Track Picks, calling the song "infectious."

== Music video ==
The song's music video, directed by David Cameron, was released along with the single in January 1995. It features the band performing on a soundstage with a futuristic set design and strobe lighting. It also includes people dancing in front of a poster for The Jerky Boys. The video received heavy airplay on MTV.

== Charts ==
=== Weekly charts ===
| Chart (1995) | Peak position |
|---|---|
| Australia (ARIA) | 52 |
| Canada Top Singles (RPM) | 8 |
| US Radio Songs (Billboard) | 49 |
| US Alternative Airplay (Billboard) | 14 |
| US Mainstream Rock (Billboard) | 2 |

=== Year-end charts ===
| Chart (1995) | Position |
|---|---|
| Canada Top Singles (RPM) | 43 |
| US Album Rock Tracks (Billboard) | 10 |

== Release history ==
| Region | Date | Format(s) | Label(s) | Ref. |
|---|---|---|---|---|
| United States | January 1995 | Radio | Atlantic | |
| Australia | April 10, 1995 | CD; cassette | Atlantic | |
