= Scream 2 (soundtrack) =

Soundtracks to the 1997 film Scream 2

The music to the 1997 slasher film Scream 2, the second instalment in the Scream franchise and a sequel to Scream (1996) featured an original soundtrack album consists of 15 songs by various artists from the R&B, rap and rock genres; excluding two ("One More Chance" and "The Race") only 13 of them appear in the film. Released as Scream 2: Music from the Dimension Motion Picture by Capitol Records on November 18, 1997, the soundtrack achieved commercial success, charting at number 50 on the Billboard 200 charts, and spent there for over ten weeks. It was certified gold by the Recording Industry Association of America, signifying that the album achieved sales in excess of 500,000 units.

Scream 2 is scored by Marco Beltrami, who also composed the predecessor, although Danny Elfman would write a choral piece titled "Cassandra Aria" which would be reprised as the finale track of the album. Excerpts from Hans Zimmer's score for the 1996 film Broken Arrow, in particular guitar work by Duane Eddy, for the character Dewey Riley, replaced the original themes that have developed for the character. Beltrami would explain in an interview that Zimmer's piece was used as a placeholder for his incomplete score during the test screening, but as the test audience were more receptive to it, the studio influenced to keep Zimmer's piece, reducing his composition "Dewey's Theme" to minor use during more serious scenes involving the character.

The score was also influenced by several other composers such as Elliot Goldenthal, Ennio Morricone and Christopher Young. Initially, the score was released along with its predecessor in a dual album in July 1998, and a complete score was released in a limited edition format in October 2016.

== Soundtrack ==
Scream 2: Music from the Dimension Motion Picture

Soundtrack album by various artists
- Released: November 18, 1997
- Recorded: 1970–1997
- Genre: Alternative rock
- Length: 62:09
- Label: Capitol

=== Track listing ===
Scream 2: Music from the Dimension Motion Picture
No.	Title	Writer(s)	Producer(s)	Length
1.	"Scream" (performed by Master P featuring Silkk The Shocker)	Master P	Craig B	3:30
2.	"Suburban Life" (performed by Kottonmouth Kings)	Kottonmouth Kings; AK Brothers	Brad Daddy X	3:34
3.	"Rivers" (performed by Sugar Ray)	Sugar Ray; McG	McG	2:50
4.	"She's Always in My Hair" (performed by D'Angelo)	Prince	D'Angelo	6:19
5.	"Help Myself" (performed by Dave Matthews Band)	David J Matthews	Steve Lillywhite	4:31
6.	"She Said" (performed by Collective Soul)	Ed Roland	Ed Roland; Greg Archilla (co.); Mike Childers (co.)	4:51
7.	"Right Place, Wrong Time" (performed by The Jon Spencer Blues Explosion)	Mac Rebennack	Dan the Automator	3:16
8.	"Dear Lover" (performed by Foo Fighters)	Dave Grohl; Foo Fighters	Gil Norton	4:33
9.	"Eyes of Sand" (performed by Tonic)	Emerson Hart (words); Tonic (music)	Tonic	4:16
10.	"The Swing" (performed by Everclear)	A.P. Alexakis; Everclear	A.P. Alexakis	2:59
11.	"I Think I Love You" (performed by Less Than Jake)	Tony Romeo	Howard Benson	2:03
12.	"Your Lucky Day in Hell" (performed by Eels)	E; Mark Goldenberg	E; Mark Goldenberg (co.)	4:26
13.	"Red Right Hand (DJ Spooky Mix)" (performed by Nick Cave and the Bad Seeds)	Nick Cave; Mick Harvey; Thomas Wydler	Tony Cohen; The Bad Seeds	8:23
14.	"One More Chance" (performed by Kelly)	Kelly; T Smoov	T Smoov	4:14
15.	"The Race" (performed by Ear2000)	Gabe Cowan; Sammy Music; David Arquette	Ear2000	2:03
Total length:				62:09

=== Reception ===
AllMusic's Stephen Erlewine was highly critical of the album, believing the content was an attempt to compensate for the previous film's lack of a hit soundtrack, but the attempt had failed, creating an "uneven" album of songs not "good enough to make [the artists'] own albums", awarding it only 2 stars out of 5.

=== Charts ===
Chart (1997–1998)	Peak position
US Billboard 200	50

=== Certifications ===
Region	Certification	Certified units/sales
United States (RIAA)	Gold	500,000^{^}
^{^} Shipments figures based on certification alone.

== Score ==
=== Release history ===
Scream 2's score was released on July 14, 1998, by Varèse Sarabande on a dual album CD which also contained tracks from the predecessor's score, also composed by Beltrami. The first release of the album had several pieces as heard in the film, had been omitted and consisted only nine tracks with a duration of 17 minutes, in contrast to the hour-long score composed for the film. Elfman's composition for the film, "Cassandra Aria" had also been omitted from the score. Several reviews were concerned with the restricted runtime and track omissions, as a result of the high fees required to be paid to composers in order to release their music commercially as did the label's unwillingness to pay. The score for both the films would be re-issued in bone white and splatter-colored vinyl editions on September 16, 2016, and a red vinyl edition followed on July 19, 2019.

On October 10, 2016, the complete score was released as a "deluxe edition" up to 2,000 copies. The album consisted of 32 tracks, running for 77 minutes, and also included the "Cassandra Theme" composed by Elfman. It was again re-issued in a limited edition box set, along with the scores from the Scream franchise, developed by Beltrami on January 7, 2022. A vinyl box set also followed on June 10.

=== Track listing ===
Original release
No.	Title	Length
1.	"Stage Fright Requiem"	2:07
2.	"Love Turns Sour"	4:44
3.	"Cici Creepies"	1:13
4.	"Deputy For a Friend"	2:17
5.	"Hollow Parting"	1:47
6.	"Dewpoint and Stabbed"	2:15
7.	"Hairtrigger Lunatic"	1:11
8.	"Sundown Search"	0:50
9.	"Its Over, Sid"	0:46
Total length:		17:10

Complete score
No.	Title	Length
1.	"Opening"	0:47
2.	"Phil Scares Maureen"	1:39
3.	"Maureen Steals the Show"	1:47
4.	"Your Lucky Day"	0:49
5.	"Check Out the News"	1:06
6.	"Sid and Randy Talk"	1:07
7.	"Introducing Gail Again"	1:09
8.	"Sid and Dewey Talk"	2:20
9.	"Dewey's Theme"	1:39
10.	"Cici's Home"	0:29
11.	"Cici Gets the Call"	2:58
12.	"Cici Is Killed"	2:37
13.	"Crime Scene"	1:33
14.	"Sidney Is Attacked"	2:50
15.	"Derek At Hospital"	1:20
16.	"Killing Theories"	1:30
17.	"Cassandra Aria^{[a]}"	2:16
18.	"Sid Runs Into Derek"	1:38
19.	"Murder In The Van"	4:07
20.	"Sid In Library"	1:27
21.	"Cotton Confronts Sidney"	2:13
22.	"Cops Question Cotton"	2:54
23.	"Joel Quits"	3:38
24.	"Dewey and Gail Attacked"	6:43
25.	"Sid Says Goodbye"	1:49
26.	"Sid Needs a New Roommate"	6:40
27.	"Cassandra Reprise^{[a]}"	1:10
28.	"Showdown"	3:17
29.	"The Big Showdown"	8:01
30.	"Sid Kills Killer"	2:46
31.	"More Lives Than a Cat"	1:15
32.	"Scream 2 Theme"	1:26
Total length:		77:00

Note

- ^{^a} composed by Danny Elfman

=== Reception ===
Writing for Filmtracks.com, Christian Clemmensen was complimentary to the score, appreciating Beltrami's evolution of his work in Scream but remarked that the most memorable music of the film would be from other composers, Elfman's contribution "Cassandra Aria" and the samples from Zimmer's score, finding the replacement of Beltrami's work for the Dewey character with Zimmer's work "effective". Ultimately, the album was called unsatisfying without Elfman's piece but better than the score for the first movie and it was awarded 3 stars out of 5.

== See also ==
- Music of the Scream franchise
