= Music Farm (music venue) =

Music venue in Charleston, South Carolina, USA

- Interactive map of Music Farm
- Address: 32 Ann St.
- Location: Charleston, South Carolina
- Coordinates: 32.7897°N 79.9380°W
- Owner: John Ellison and Marshall Lowe
- Capacity: 800

Construction
- Opened: April 1991; 35 years ago

Website
- music-farm.com

Music Farm is a music venue in Charleston, South Carolina located off of King Street. It was established on East Bay Street in April 1991 by Kevin Wadley and Carter McMillan. In the summer of 1998, the Music Farm was sold to Craig Comer, Riddick Lynch and Yates Dew.

In late September 2007 the Music Farm was purchased by John Ellison of Charlotte, NC and Marshall Lowe of Charleston, SC. Ellison, who also owns Amos' Southend in Charlotte and Lowe, one-third of the promotional company All In Entertainment, made several renovations to the club, including the addition of a new sound and lighting system, an expansion the balcony, and a complete remodeling of the bathrooms, and the club reopened on 28 October 2007 with The Avett Brothers.
