= December (Collective Soul song) =

1995 single by Collective Soul

Single by Collective Soul

from the album Collective Soul
- Released: March 17, 1995
- Studio: Criteria (Miami, Florida)
- Genre: Alternative rock
- Length: 4:45
- Label: Atlantic
- Songwriter: Ed Roland
- Producers: Ed Roland; Matt Serletic

Collective Soul singles chronology
"Gel" (1995)	"December" (1995)	"Smashing Young Man" (1995)

Music video
- "December" on YouTube

"December" is a song by American alternative rock band Collective Soul, released on the band's 1995 eponymous album. It was serviced to album rock radio on March 17, 1995. Written by singer and guitarist Ed Roland, it peaked at number 20 on the US Billboard Hot 100 and number one on the Billboard Album Rock Tracks chart for nine weeks, becoming that chart's most successful song of 1995. In Canada, the song reached number two on the RPM 100 Hit Tracks chart, becoming the band's highest-charting single until "The World I Know" attained the top spot in March 1996.

== Composition ==
In a December 2017 interview with Songfacts, lead singer Ed Roland explained the inspiration behind "December":

We were going through a tough time with our first manager, and I just felt like at the time, a lot of stuff happened really quickly. You've got to remember, we had a hit song before we had a label or even a true band. So, that relationship started to deteriorate. And while we were in the studio, it came pretty natural. I just wanted to talk about how I felt I was being used and whatever I did was not good enough ever.

== Track listings ==
US 7-inch single

A. "December" – 4:09
B. "Gel" – 2:59

US cassette single

1. "December" (edit)
2. "Where the River Flows" (LP version)

German and Australian CD single

1. "December" (LP version)
2. "Sister Don't Cry" (acoustic)
3. "Where the River Flows" (live)
4. "December" (live)
- All live tracks were recorded on March 14, 1995, at The Thunderdome (St. Petersburg, Florida)

== Charts ==
=== Weekly charts ===
Chart (1995)	Peak position
Australia (ARIA)	97
Canada Contemporary Album Radio (The Record)	1
Canada Top Singles (RPM)	2
Canada Rock/Alternative (RPM)	2
New Zealand (Recorded Music NZ)	34
Quebec Airplay (ADISQ)	12
US Billboard Hot 100	20
US Adult Pop Airplay (Billboard)	11
US Adult Contemporary (Billboard)	14
US Alternative Airplay (Billboard)	2
US Mainstream Rock Airplay (Billboard)	1
US Pop Airplay (Billboard)	7
US Cash Box Top 100	15

=== Year-end charts ===
Chart (1995)	Position
Brazil (Crowley)	66
Canada Top Singles (RPM)	26
Canada Rock/Alternative (RPM)	11
US Billboard Hot 100	41
US Album Rock Tracks (Billboard)	1
US Modern Rock Tracks (Billboard)	7
US Top 40/Mainstream (Billboard)	21

== Release history ==
Region	Date	Format(s)	Label(s)	Ref.
United States	March 17, 1995	Album rock radio	Atlantic	
United States	March 24, 1995	Top 40 radio	Atlantic	
United States	April 3, 1995	Progressive rock radio	Atlantic	
Australia	June 26, 1995	CD; cassette	Atlantic	

== Cover version ==
Burmese rock band Iron Cross has "copied" the song live in concert.
