= Blame (Collective Soul song) =

Single by Collective Soul

from the album Disciplined Breakdown
- Released: 1997
- Recorded: 1996
- Length: 4:42
- Label: Atlantic
- Songwriter: Ed Roland
- Producer: Ed Roland

Collective Soul singles chronology
| "Listen" (1997) | "Blame" (1997) | "She Said" (1998) |

Music video
- "Blame" on YouTube

"Blame" is a song by the American post-grunge band Collective Soul. It is the third and final single from their third studio album, Disciplined Breakdown.

== Charts ==
| Chart (1997) | Peak position |
|---|---|
| Quebec Airplay (ADISQ) | 33 |
| US Billboard Mainstream Rock Tracks | 11 |

== Music video ==
The video features the band performing as a circus act alongside the show's performers including the Muscle Man played by Nick Offerman.
