= Listen (Collective Soul song) =

1997 single by Collective Soul

Single by Collective Soul

from the album Disciplined Breakdown
- Released: May 20, 1997
- Length: 4:14
- Label: Atlantic
- Songwriter: Ed Roland
- Producer: Ed Roland

Collective Soul singles chronology
"Precious Declaration" (1997)	"Listen" (1997)	"Blame" (1997)

Music video
- "Listen" on YouTube

"Listen" is a song by the American band Collective Soul. It was released as the second single from their third studio album, Disciplined Breakdown, in May 1997 and gave the band their fourth consecutive number-one single on the US Billboard Mainstream Rock Tracks chart.

== Charts ==
=== Weekly charts ===
Chart (1997)	Peak position
Canada Top Singles (RPM)	39
Canada Rock/Alternative (RPM)	2
Mexico International (Notitas Musicales)	4
Quebec Airplay (ADISQ)	13
US Billboard Hot 100	72
US Alternative Airplay (Billboard)	17
US Mainstream Rock (Billboard)	1

=== Year-end charts ===
Chart (1997)	Position
Canada Rock/Alternative (RPM)	23
US Mainstream Rock Tracks (Billboard)	9
US Modern Rock Tracks (Billboard)	60
