= Jason Fowler (musician) =

American Christian musician (born 1971)

- Born: Jason Allen Fowler; January 21, 1971 (age 55); Atlanta, Georgia, U.S.
- Genres: Worship; Christian pop; Christian rock; Christian country; gospel; pop rock; southern rock
- Occupations: Singer; songwriter; guitarist; worship leader
- Instruments: vocals; guitar
- Years active: 2014–present
- Labels: Black Cat, RCity
- Website: jasonfowlermusic.com

Jason Allen Fowler (born January 21, 1971) is an American Christian musician, who plays a Christian pop, Christian rock and Christian country style of contemporary worship and gospel music. He has released two studio albums, Letters from the Inside (2014) and I Fall In (2016).

== Early and personal life ==
Fowler was born Jason Allen Fowler, on January 21, 1971, in Atlanta, Georgia, to parents Terrel and Jeanne Fowler, where he was raised with a younger brother, Chad, born exactly a year later than Fowler, and a younger sister, Cara. His wife is Tiffany, and together they have three sons. Jason has been a recovering alcoholic and drug addict since checking himself into a Christian-based rehab facility in 2005. He became a Christian and now travels all over singing his songs and telling his story of redemption through the gift of music.

== Music career ==
Jason has been playing music most of his life and landed a record deal with his band Ultraphonic in 2001. After recording their label debut at Muscle Shoals Sound Studio with producer Johnny Sandlin (Allman Brothers Band), the band was set for stardom. With an album ready to go, the band had some unfortunate news. The record label was sold to another company and the album was shelved. Fowler found himself lost and broken. The label dreams were falling apart, the band was falling apart, and he was falling apart. With addiction and alcohol driving the train, Jason ended up a train wreck and eventually homeless. After being kicked out of a drug dealers house with nowhere else to go, Fowler found himself at the bottom. This is where everything changed. It's where he changed. Jason cried out for help. This is where he found God...at the end of himself. After almost 2 years of rehab in the Georgia Music City of Athens, Jason came home and started a new life. It took more than three years for Jason to start playing music again, but he couldn't hide the fact that the music was in his blood. Jason started writing songs about his recovery and his new found faith. His Christian music recording career started in 2014, with his first studio album, Letters from the Inside, on May 13, 2014, from Black Cat Studios. He released his second album, I Fall In, on May 13, 2016, with RCity Records. Jason is currently finishing up his third solo album with Grammy Nominated and Dove Award-winning producer Ian Eskelin expected to release late 2021.

== Discography ==
Studio albums

- Letters from the Inside (May 13, 2016, Black Cat)
- I Fall In (May 13, 2016, RCity)
