= She Said (Collective Soul song) =

Single by Collective Soul

from the album Scream 2: Music from the Dimension Motion Picture
- Released: 1998
- Recorded: 1997
- Studio: Triclops Recording, Atlanta
- Genre: Alternative rock, post-grunge
- Length: 4:51 (original version); 4:14 (Dosage version)
- Label: Atlantic
- Songwriter(s): Ed Roland
- Producer(s): Ed Roland; Greg Archilla; Mike Childers

Collective Soul singles chronology
"Blame" (1997)	"She Said" (1998)	"Run" (1999)

"She Said" is a song by American post-grunge band Collective Soul. It was featured in the 1997 slasher film Scream 2 during the closing credits as well as on its accompanying soundtrack. A music video was released for the song featuring scenes from the film.

A slightly different version of the song was later featured as a hidden track on the band's fourth studio album Dosage.

== Charts ==
Chart performance for "She Said"
Chart (1998)	Peak position
US Billboard Mainstream Rock Tracks	16
US Billboard Modern Rock Tracks	39
