= Devils 'n Darlins =

Studio album by Ed Roland and the Sweet Tea Project
- Released: September 3, 2013
- Recorded: 2011
- Genre: Rock
- Label: 429
- Producer: Ed Roland

Singles from Devils 'n Darlins
- 1. "Love Won't Bring Us Down" Released: August 13, 2013

Devils 'n Darlins is the debut studio album by American rock band Ed Roland and the Sweet Tea Project.

== Track listing ==
No.	Title	Length
1.	"Devils 'n Darlins"	2:59
2.	"Going To Birmingham"	4:38
3.	"Oh Lord"	3:28
4.	"When It Comes Down To Love"	3:52
5.	"Forget About Your Life (For A While)"	3:10
6.	"Love Won't Bring Us Down"	4:16
7.	"Already Over"	3:09
8.	"Enough Nickels"	4:06
9.	"Just As I Am"	3:55
10.	"Pile of Pearls"	3:52
11.	"Lennon's Lullaby"	4:45
