= Magnets and Ghosts =

American rock band

- Origin: Atlanta, Georgia, U.S.
- Genre: Alternative rock
- Years active: 2010–present
- Label: Independent
- Members: Dean Roland; Ryan Potesta
- Website: magnetsandghosts.com

Magnets and Ghosts (sometimes stylized as Magnets & Ghosts) are an American alternative rock band from Atlanta, Georgia. The duo consists of Dean Roland and Ryan Potesta. They released their debut album, Mass, on November 1, 2011.

== History ==
Potesta first met Roland when he worked on the 2007 Collective Soul album Afterwords. The two discovered they had similar taste in music and when Collective Soul went on hiatus in 2010 they decided to form their own band. Beginning in fall 2010, the two began writing songs for what would become their debut album Mass. Mass was released on November 1, 2011. In 2014 they released the EP, Be Born.

== Discography ==
=== Studio albums ===
Year	Title
2011	Mass: Released: November 1, 2011; Label: MAG Productions; Formats: CD, digital download
2018	Space Time Gender: Released: June 1, 2018; Label: MAG Productions; Formats: CD, LP, Digital

=== Extended plays ===
Year	Title
2014	Be Born: Released: November 10, 2014; Label: MAG Productions; Formats: CD, digital download

== Videography ==
=== Music videos ===
List of music videos, showing year released and director
Title	Year	Director(s)
"Like a Sunday"	2012	Aaron Chewning
"Light My Flame"	2013	Aaron Chewning
"Hold On"	2013	Sean David Harris

== Concert tours ==
Headlining

- Light My Flame Tour (2013)
