= Better Now (Collective Soul song) =

2005 single by Collective Soul

Single by Collective Soul

from the album Cursed: Original Motion Picture Soundtrack and Youth
- B-side: "General Attitude"
- Released: January 24, 2005
- Length: 3:14
- Label: El
- Songwriters: Ed Roland, Dexter Green
- Producers: Ed Roland, Dexter Green

Collective Soul singles chronology
"Counting the Days" (2004)	"Better Now" (2005)	"How Do You Love" (2005)

"Better Now" is a song by American alternative rock band Collective Soul, released as the second single off their sixth studio album, Youth (2004), on January 24, 2005. It was written by singer-guitarist Ed Roland and producer Dexter Green. The coda features a saxophone solo. In concert, this is replaced with a guitar solo. The radio edit version also includes a guitar solo. "Better Now" failed to chart on the US Billboard Hot 100 but peaked at number 17 on the Bubbling Under Hot 100 chart and entered the top 10 on the Adult Top 40 and Triple-A rankings.

== Composition ==
During a live Collective Soul performance at The Cabot in Beverly, Massachusetts, on August 19, 2023, Ed Roland said that "Better Now" is "...the best damn divorce song ever. And honestly, I'll lay this down on any divorce song ever on the planet. I will. Because it's positive. It's not negative. It's positive." Jason Damas of PopMatters described the song as "a big, energetic pop hook set to a Cars-ish, robotic grind, and is spiked with a colorful layer of horns for color."

== Charts ==
=== Weekly charts ===
Chart (2005)	Peak position
Canada Hot AC Top 30 (Radio & Records)	3
US Bubbling Under Hot 100 (Billboard)	17
US Adult Alternative Airplay (Billboard)	10
US Adult Pop Airplay (Billboard)	9

=== Year-end charts ===
Chart (2005)	Position
US Adult Top 40 (Billboard)	23
US Triple-A (Billboard)	39

== Release history ==
Region	Date	Format	Label	Ref.
United States	January 24, 2005	Triple-A radio	El	
United States	February 11, 2005	Hot adult contemporary radio	El	

== In popular culture ==
- The Blue Chip Casino in Michigan City, Indiana, uses the song in recent television and radio ads.
- The Kellogg Company used it in an ad for its Special K cereal, "feeling better now" in this instance being used to denote a woman's feeling healthier after going on their "Special K diet."
- For the 2008 Canadian election, Conservative prime minister Stephen Harper used the song as his intro music when he entered his party HQ for a victory speech. The song was similarly used in the 2011 Conservative federal election campaign. The song was once again featured heavily by the Conservative Party during the 2015 federal election campaign.
- The ending of the film Cursed. It is also featured on the soundtrack to the film.
- The band performed the song in the Charmed episode "Scry Hard".
- The trailer for the 2007 film Wild Hogs features the song.
