= Will Turpin =

American musician

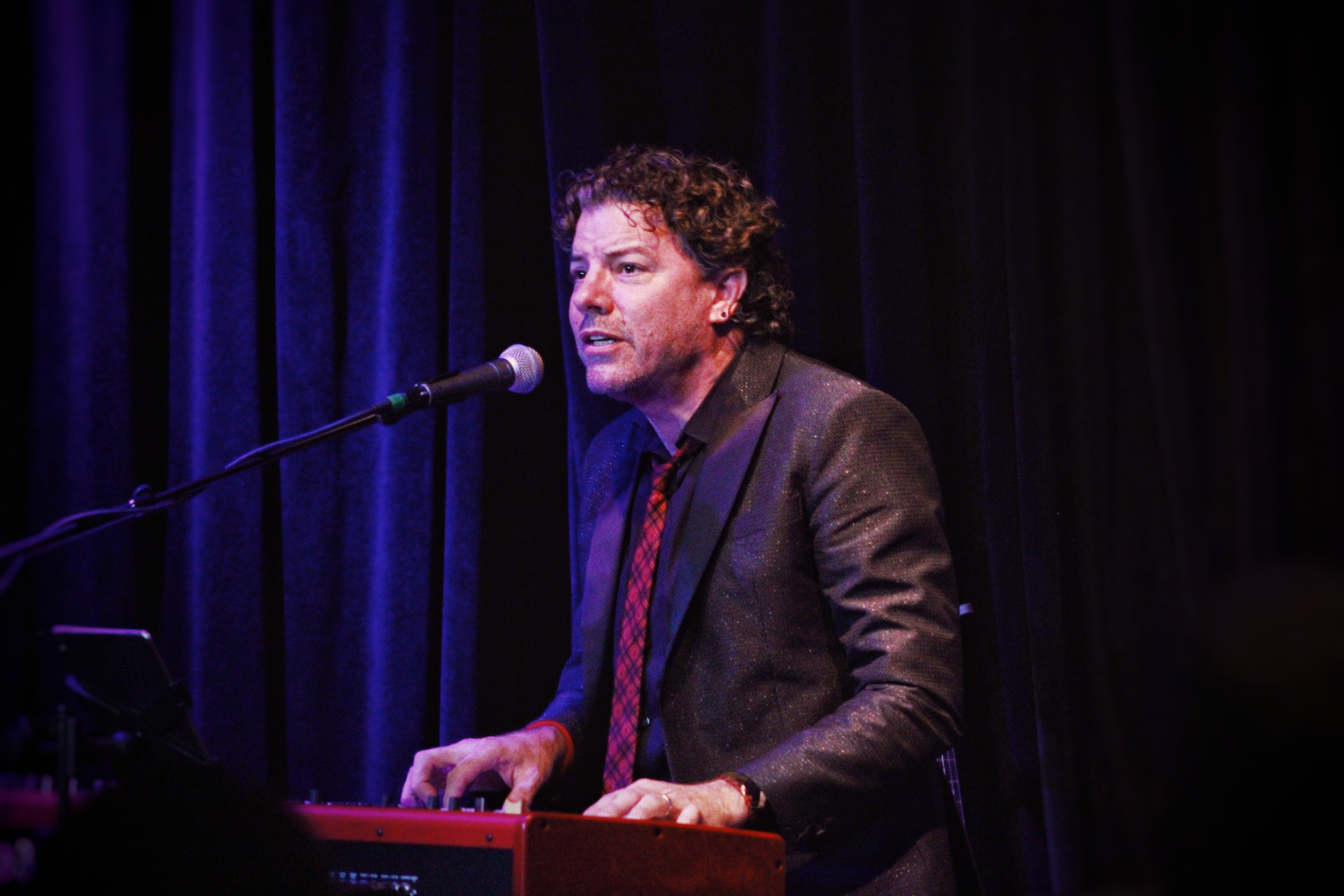
- Turpin at Eddie's Attic in Decatur, Georgia (2021)

Background information
- Born: William Ross Turpin; February 8, 1971 (age 55); Fairbanks, Alaska, U.S.
- Origin: Stockbridge, Georgia, U.S.
- Genres: Alternative rock, hard rock, post-grunge
- Occupations: Musician, songwriter, producer
- Instruments: Bass, keyboards, vocals, piano, percussion, drums, guitar
- Years active: 1993–present
- Label: Gooey

William Ross Turpin (born February 8, 1971) is an American musician. He is best known for being the bassist of the rock band Collective Soul. He is also a solo artist, and tours with his backing band, the Way. His debut EP, The Lighthouse, was released in 2011. He owns an indie record label called Gooey Music.

== Life and career ==
=== Early life and career beginnings ===
Turpin was born in Fairbanks, Alaska, and raised in Stockbridge, Georgia. Turpin's father, Bill, opened Real 2 Reel Studios in nearby Jonesboro, Georgia in 1976.

Turpin began taking piano lessons when he was eight years old. He majored in percussion while attending Florida State University and Georgia State University. He is married to Donna, and they have three children.

=== Collective Soul ===
Turpin joined Collective Soul in 1993.

=== Other projects ===
Turpin makes an appearance on the album How Do You Live (1997) by Michelle Penn. He has collaborated with Atlanta-based group Abel, Rawls & Hayes on several albums. Turpin served as the producer for the album Certified Organic by Michael Tolcher. He performs bass on Collective Soul bandmate Ed Roland's unreleased solo album Anniversary, and is featured in the music video for the track "Searching For."

==== Solo career ====
The Way
- Origin: Atlanta, Georgia, U.S.
- Genre: Rock
- Years active: 2011–present
- Label: Gooey
- Members: Will Turpin; Jason Fowler; Mark Wilson
- Past members: Scott Davidson

Turpin released his first solo EP, The Lighthouse, on October 11, 2011. This five-track EP features collaborations from Collective Soul bandmates Ed Roland, Joel Kosche, and Ryan Hoyle; along with guitarist Peter Stroud. To promote the release, Turpin formed a band called the Way to back him at live performances. The band originally featured Jason Fowler and Scott Davidson, with Mark Wilson joining the lineup afterwards. Davidson left the band in 2013.

Turpin recorded a version of "What Child Is This?" for the charity album A Rock By The Sea Christmas: Volume Three (2012). On February 7, 2013, Turpin and the Way performed a Stageit concert held at Real 2 Reel Studios. This show was recorded and later released as a live EP, The Lighthouse (Live from Real 2 Reel Studios). Beginning in 2013, he has hosted annual Christmas rock concerts titled "Rock the Cradle" for churches each December.

Turpin began recording his first studio album, Serengeti Drivers, in October 2012. The album was released on June 8, 2018.

== Discography ==
With Collective Soul

Solo

- The Lighthouse (2011)
- The Lighthouse (Live from Real 2 Reel Studios) (2013)
- Serengeti Drivers (2018)
