= Counting the Days (Collective Soul song) =

Single by Collective Soul

from the album Youth
- Released: September 21, 2004
- Length: 2:38
- Label: El Music Group
- Songwriter: Ed Roland
- Producers: Ed Roland; Dexter Green

Collective Soul singles chronology
"Next Homecoming" (2001)	"Counting the Days" (2004)	"Better Now" (2004)

"Counting the Days" is a song by the American rock band Collective Soul. It served as the lead single from their sixth studio album Youth. It is the band's first single released by their own independent record label, El Music Group, following their departure from Atlantic Records in 2001.

The song is featured on the soundtrack of the 2004 film NASCAR 3D: The IMAX Experience.

== Charts ==
Chart (2004)	Peak position
Canada Radio (Nielsen BDS)	15
Canada Rock Top 30 (Radio & Records)	2
U.S. Billboard Mainstream Rock Tracks	8

== Acoustic version ==
An acoustic version is featured on the 2005 EP From the Ground Up.
