= The Sweet Tea Project =

American rock band

- Also known as: Ed Roland and the Sweet Tea Project
- Origin: Atlanta, Georgia, U.S.
- Years active: 2011–present
- Label: 429
- Members: Ed Roland; Christopher Alan Yates; Brian Bisky; Jesse Triplett; Mike Rizzi
- Website: thesweetteaproject.com

The Sweet Tea Project is an American rock band from Atlanta, Georgia.

== History ==
=== 2011–12: Early years ===
Ed Roland, frontman of the rock band Collective Soul, formed the Sweet Tea Project in 2011 with a group of friends and musicians.

The Sweet Tea Project recorded a cover version of "Shelter from the Storm" for the Bob Dylan tribute album Chimes of Freedom (2012).

=== 2013–16: Devils 'n Darlins ===
The Sweet Tea Project were among eight artists who recorded a version of the NBA on ESPN theme, as part of a contest held by ESPN where fans could vote for their favorite. The Sweet Tea Project won the competition, which resulted in their rendition being featured during the network's coverage of the 2013 NBA All-Star Celebrity Game.

The Sweet Tea Project's debut album, Devils 'n Darlins, was released on September 3, 2013, by 429 Records. The album's first single, "Love Won't Bring Us Down," was released on August 13. 429 Records noted the single received strong airplay in markets such as Los Angeles, San Francisco and Boston.

In June 2015, a music video for the track "Just As I Am" was released.

=== 2017–present: Alder Lane Farm ===
In February 2017, it was announced that Roland hired Tony Caporale, the TwinBear Management founder and CEO, as the band's new manager.

The Sweet Tea Project's second album, Alder Lane Farm, was released on October 6, 2017. An official music video for the track "Evangeline" was released on September 29.

== Origin of band name ==
In a 2013 interview with ESPN, Roland explained the background of the band's name: "It's a very Southern thing. We wanted to have an Americana flavor. There's nothing more American or Southern than sweet tea. That's what we grew up drinking."

== Discography ==
=== Studio albums ===
Year	Title
2013	Devils 'n Darlins: Released: September 3, 2013; Label: 429 Records; Formats: CD, Digital
2017	Alder Lane Farm: Released: October 6, 2017; Label: Fuzze Flex Records; Formats: Vinyl, CD, Digital

== See also ==
- List of artists who have covered Bob Dylan songs
- Music of Atlanta
