= Shine (Collective Soul song) =

1994 single by Collective Soul

Single by Collective Soul

from the album Hints Allegations and Things Left Unsaid
- B-side: "Scream"; "Almost You"
- Released: March 8, 1994
- Recorded: 1992
- Genre: Post-grunge; alternative rock
- Length: 5:05 (original version album version); 4:40 (original version radio edit)
- Label: Atlantic
- Songwriter: Ed Roland
- Producer: Ed Roland

Collective Soul singles chronology
"Shine" (1994)	"Breathe" (1994)

Music video
- "Shine" on YouTube

"Shine" is a song by American alternative rock band Collective Soul. It served as the lead single for their debut album, Hints Allegations and Things Left Unsaid (1993), and as the band's debut single. "Shine" remained the band's most well-known song and a hallmark of 1990s alternative rock. The song reached number one on the US Billboard Album Rock Tracks chart for eight weeks, ending 1994 as that chart's most successful single. The song then went on to peak at number 11 on the Billboard Hot 100 for one week.

"Shine" won a Billboard award for Top Rock Track. VH1 would later rank the song at number 42 on their list of the "100 Greatest Songs of the '90s". In 2012, a rerecorded version recorded by Collective Soul was released as a playable song for the game Rock Band Blitz. In 2015 the rerecorded version was released on the bonus Greatest Hits CD that was included with the Walmart exclusive deluxe edition of See What You Started by Continuing.

== Overview ==
Lead singer Ed Roland said:

I had riffs – this was the late '80s and I was writing a lot of songs. I called it "drone," where you either drone the A or the E, and play a melody under it. So, I had a bunch of them that the band I was in at the time were playing. But I always had the "Shine" riff, and I thought, "That's a cool riff." Then I came home and spent the night with my parents and Dean, who is 10 years younger than me – I didn't even know he played guitar. So he was playing guitar, and I joined in. I just showed him the riff, and I was like, "I need to finish this." So, I literally just wrote it right there, with Dean, sitting in my parents' living room. I didn't think anything about it. I probably wrote it in 1989, and it wasn't out until 1994.

Due to the song's lyrical themes, particularly the mention of "heaven", Collective Soul was often early on regarded as a Christian band. Ed Roland elaborated, "I remember around the time ["Shine" came out] getting into an argument with a writer who said, 'You're a Christian band.' I said, 'No, we're not.' 'Well, you have the word heaven in your song.' And I said, 'Well, so does Led Zeppelin. I don't remember anyone saying they were a Christian band.'" He went on to stress that such classification would unite the bandmates' beliefs and that a particular doctrine cannot speak for all its members. Roland did note, however, his religious background and the fact that his father is a Southern Baptist minister, but that this does not justify a Christian label. Collective Soul rhythm guitarist Dean Roland has called the song's chorus "basically a prayer" and noted that the uplifting single was released during an odd time amidst heavy grunge. He noted that despite the song's unique feel, this circumstance wrongfully pigeonholed the band as being grunge.

"Shine" features guitar with a slight distortion and mellow atmosphere throughout the verses. Its chorus pounds with staccato riffs before brightening up with the lyrics "Heaven let your light shine down." Later, the song's bridge modulates into double-time behind a hard rock guitar solo played by Ross Childress before returning to its previous state of calmness. Ed Roland said the iconic "yeah" before the chorus was created by him singing into an empty toilet paper roll he found in his bathroom. Critics stated, "While the song's riff made it sound a piece with grunge, 'Shine' is also home to a blistering pentatonic-based guitar solo that has more in common with 1980s metal soloing." It has also been described as post-grunge and alternative rock.

== Music video ==
The song's video, which was written and directed by William Levin and achieved popularity on MTV, features various footage, largely black-and-white. Youths are seen carrying seemingly random items across a rural area and railroad tracks before arriving at an old shed and watching the band perform. "Shine" was included on the era-themed compilation Essential Music Videos: '90s Rock.

== Legacy and appearances ==
"Shine" has remained a symbol of 1990s alternative rock. Stephen Thomas Erlewine of Allmusic regarded the song "a tremendous guilty pleasure, built on a guitar riff so indelible you swear it's stolen, blessed by a sighing melody that makes this a fine album-rock single that would have sounded as good in '74 as it did in '94." Due to its popularity among 1990s music, "Shine" has been included on various era-themed compilation albums including VH1: I Love the '90s, Whatever: The '90s Pop and Culture Box, Big Shiny '90s, and The Buzz. Live versions have been included on the Woodstock '94 and Much at Edgefest 1999 compilations.

== Track listing ==
All songs were written by Ed Roland.

- CD single
1. "Shine" – 5:05
2. "Scream" (non-LP B-side) – 3:00
3. "Almost You" (non-LP B-side) – 2:58

== Charts ==
=== Weekly charts ===
Chart (1994–1995)	Peak position
Australia (ARIA)	8
Austria (Ö3 Austria Top 40)	25
Canada Top Singles (RPM)	6
Europe Southwest Airplay (Music & Media)	6
France (SNEP)	50
Iceland (Íslenski Listinn Topp 40)	6
New Zealand (Recorded Music NZ)	21
Quebec Airplay (ADISQ)	40
Scottish Singles Sales (Official Charts)	85
UK Singles (Official Charts)	80
US Billboard Hot 100	11
US Alternative Airplay (Billboard)	4
US Mainstream Rock Airplay (Billboard)	1
US Pop Airplay (Billboard)	4
US Cash Box Top 100	7

=== Year-end charts ===
Chart (1994)	Position
Australia (ARIA)	65
Canada Top Singles (RPM)	50
Iceland (Íslenski Listinn Topp 40)	35
US Billboard Hot 100	31
US Album Rock Tracks (Billboard)	1
US Modern Rock Tracks (Billboard)	13
US Cash Box Top 100	16

== Certifications ==
Region	Certification	Certified units/sales
United States (RIAA)	Gold	500,000^{^}
^{^} Shipments figures based on certification alone.

== Release history ==
Region	Date	Format(s)	Label(s)	Ref.
United States	March 8, 1994	Album rock radio	Atlantic	
United States	March 22, 1994	Top 40 radio	Atlantic	
United States	April 1994	Modern rock radio	Atlantic	
United Kingdom	July 25, 1994	12-inch vinyl; CD; cassette	Atlantic	

== Cover versions ==
Dolly Parton recorded a cover of "Shine" for her 2001 album Little Sparrow with members of the alt and bluegrass band Nickel Creek. Parton's recording of the song earned her a Grammy Award for Best Female Country Vocal Performance.

Covered by the Holmes Brothers on Simple Truths (album).
