= The World I Know =

1995 single by Collective Soul

Single by Collective Soul

from the album Collective Soul
- B-side: "When the Water Falls" (live acoustic); "Smashing Young Man"
- Released: October 23, 1995
- Studio: Criteria (Miami, Florida); Kiva (Memphis, Tennessee); Streeterville (Chicago, Illinois); Granny's (Reno, Nevada)
- Length: 4:16
- Label: Atlantic
- Composers: Ed Roland; Ross Childress
- Lyricist: Ed Roland
- Producers: Ed Roland; Matt Serletic

Collective Soul singles chronology
"Smashing Young Man" (1995)	"The World I Know" (1995)	"Where the River Flows" (1996)

Music video
- "The World I Know" on YouTube

"The World I Know" is a song by American rock band Collective Soul from their second studio album, Collective Soul (1995). The song was released as the album's fourth single in October 1995. "The World I Know" peaked at number 19 on the US Billboard Hot 100 chart, spent four weeks at number one on the Billboard Album Rock Tracks chart, and became the first number-one single on the Billboard Triple-A chart. In Canada, the song reached number one on the week of March 11, 1996, becoming the band's highest-charting single there.

== Background ==
In a December 2017 interview with Songfacts, lead singer Ed Roland explained the inspiration behind "The World I Know":

I wrote that when we had a day off in New York City. This was 25 years ago, when we were in Times Square, which is not what Times Square is now, which is like Disneyland. There was still some grit and dirt to New York City - especially around Times Square and Union Square back then. I literally walked out of the room, took a two-hour walk around New York, and just absorbed and observed from the highs and lows of what society was offering in the greatest city in the world.

Although Roland and lead guitarist Ross Childress share writing credits for the music, Roland has denied his involvement. During an interview on The Professor of Rock YouTube channel with Adam Reader that was posted on October 10, 2022, Roland corrected Reader on the official authorship credits for this song. When Reader mentioned, "Co-written with Ross Childress...", Roland stopped him and stated, "No, not co-written. And, I'm going to say it right now, he didn't write a damn thing. He didn't even play on the song. He gets credit, 'cause he wanted credit. And, at the early time of a band, you want to make sure everybody's clear and cool. He didn't write a damn thing."

== Music video ==
The music video depicts a businessman who begins to go about his day, walking past the Colgate Clock and looking at the World Trade Center in the distance, reading The New York Times on the way to his office. As he reads about death, and sees the homelessness and sadness on the street, he becomes disillusioned with his life and prepares to commit suicide. As he climbs to the roof of a nearby building, he takes off his shoes and looks at the ground crying. He stretches out his arms and readies himself to fall. However, just as he is about to fall, a dove lands on his arm. He feeds it with the bagel in his pocket, and the crumbs attract ants, which makes the man notice the similarities of them to the people walking below. He laughs throwing all his money at the people and pulls himself out of his state.

During the entire video, periodic cuts to singer Ed Roland looking on at the man while singing the song are shown. The video also shows sadness and happiness in the form of color hues for the video. While the man is disillusioned with his life and is thinking about suicide, the video is in a blue and purple tint, giving a dark feeling to the video. When the dove lands on the man's arm, the video's hue changes to show the city in color, the sun overhead, and an understanding that the pain and happiness of life are all relative and better seen with perspective.

== Track listings ==
US CD and cassette single; Australian CD single

1. "The World I Know" – 4:15
2. "When the Water Falls" (live acoustic) – 3:41

US 7-inch single

A. "The World I Know" – 4:16
B. "Smashing Young Man" – 3:44

UK CD single

1. "The World I Know" (edit) – 3:51
2. "When the Water Falls" (live acoustic) – 3:41
3. "The World I Know" (LP version) – 4:15

== Charts ==
=== Weekly charts ===
Chart (1996)	Peak position
Australia (ARIA)	41
Canada Top Singles (RPM)	1
Canada Adult Contemporary (RPM)	41
Canada Rock/Alternative (RPM)	5
Iceland (Íslenski Listinn Topp 40)	33
New Zealand (Recorded Music NZ)	25
Quebec Airplay (ADISQ)	9
US Billboard Hot 100	19
US Adult Alternative Airplay (Billboard)	1
US Adult Contemporary (Billboard)	34
US Adult Pop Airplay (Billboard)	18
US Alternative Airplay (Billboard)	6
US Mainstream Rock Airplay (Billboard)	1
US Pop Airplay (Billboard)	8
US Cash Box Top 100	17

=== Year-end charts ===
Chart (1996)	Position
Canada Top Singles (RPM)	33
US Billboard Hot 100	41
US Adult Top 40 (Billboard)	38
US Mainstream Rock Tracks (Billboard)	8
US Modern Rock Tracks (Billboard)	25
US Top 40/Mainstream (Billboard)	24
US Triple-A (Billboard)	18

== Certifications ==
Certifications for "The World I Know"
Region	Certification	Certified units/sales
New Zealand (RMNZ)	Gold	15,000^{‡}
^{‡} Sales+streaming figures based on certification alone.

== Release history ==
Region	Date	Format(s)	Label(s)	Ref.
United States	October 23, 1995	Rock radio	Atlantic	
United States	October 24, 1995	Contemporary hit radio	Atlantic	

== Cover versions ==
On May 20, 2008, David Cook, winner of the seventh season of American Idol performed the song. Following his performance, Cook's version peaked at number 14 on the Billboard Hot Digital Songs chart and number 28 on the Billboard Hot 100.
