= Luis Guzmán =

Puerto Rican actor (born 1956)

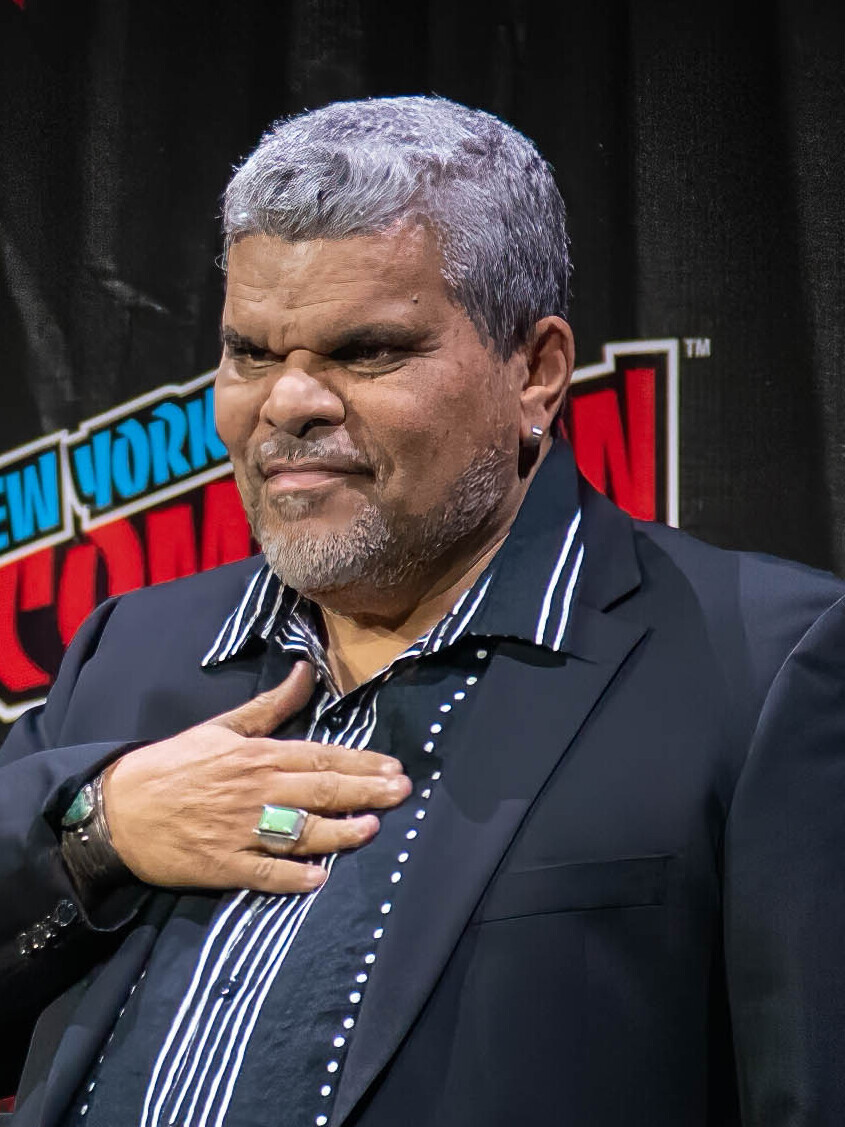
- Guzmán at the 2022 New York Comic Con
- Born: October 22, 1956 (age 70); Cayey, Puerto Rico
- Education: City College of New York
- Occupation: Actor
- Years active: 1977–present
- Spouse: Angelita Galarza (m. 1985)
- Children: 6

Luis Guzmán (born October 22, 1956) is a Puerto Rican actor. His career spans over 40 years and includes a number of films and television series. He has appeared in Paul Thomas Anderson's films Boogie Nights (1997), Magnolia (1999) and Punch-Drunk Love (2002), and Steven Soderbergh's films Out of Sight (1998), The Limey (1999) and Traffic (2000). His other film credits include Q & A (1990), The Hard Way (1991), Carlito's Way (1993), Snake Eyes (1998) and Keanu (2016). For his role in The Limey, he received a nomination for the Independent Spirit Award for Best Supporting Male.

On television, he starred as Raoul Hernandez on the HBO prison drama Oz (1998–2000), José Gonzalo Rodríguez Gacha on Narcos (2015), Jesse "Mama" Salander on the CBS medical drama Code Black (2015–2018), Alejandro "Guapo" Villabuena in Godfather of Harlem (2019), Hector Contreras on Perpetual Grace, LTD (2019), and Gomez Addams on Wednesday (2022–present).

== Early life ==
Guzmán was born on born October 22, 1956 in Cayey, Puerto Rico, and was raised on the Lower East Side of Manhattan. He went to Seward Park High School. His mother, Rosa, was a hospital worker, and his stepfather, Benjamin Cardona, was a TV repairman. Guzmán graduated from City College of New York, and shortly after began his career as a social worker, working as a youth counselor at the Henry Street Settlement. He moonlighted as an actor, eventually becoming heavily involved in street theatre and independent films.

== Career ==
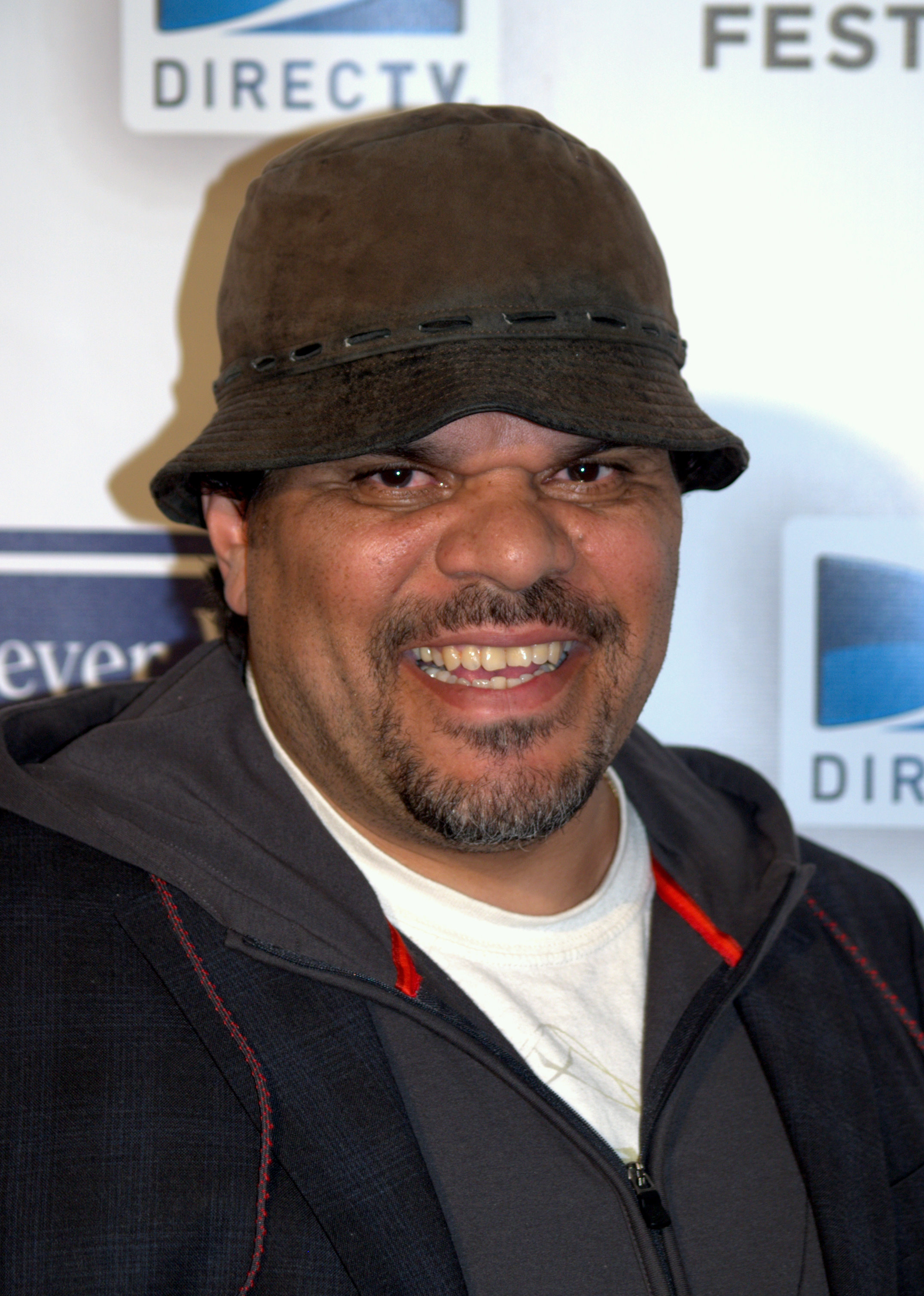
Guzmán at the 2009 premiere of Whatever Works

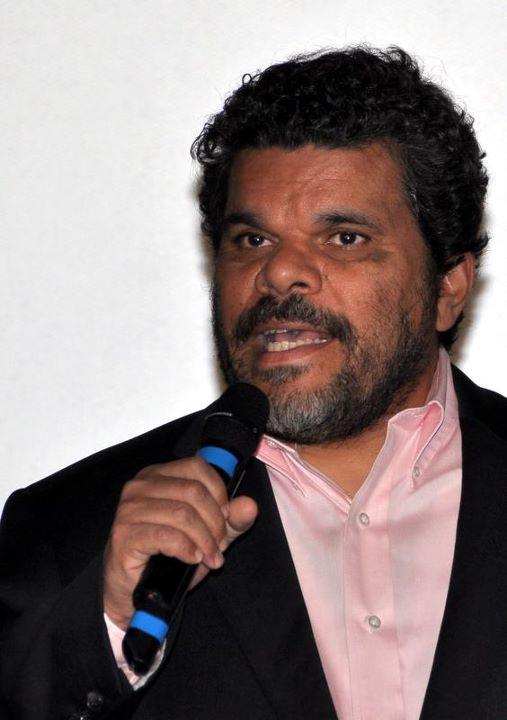
Guzmán speaks at the 2012 premiere of Journey 2: The Mysterious Island

Guzman's numerous movie credits include Carlito's Way, Carlito's Way: Rise to Power, Punch-Drunk Love, Welcome to Collinwood, Stonewall, Waiting..., The Salton Sea, and Lemony Snicket's A Series of Unfortunate Events. He has also appeared on the TV shows Homicide: Life on the Street, Frasier, Community (as himself) and Oz and voiced Ricardo Diaz in the video game Grand Theft Auto: Vice City and its prequel Grand Theft Auto: Vice City Stories. Guzmán starred in the short-lived 2003 television comedy Luis, and is a commentator on VH1's I Love the '80s, as well as I Love Toys and its sequels, including I Love the '70s and I Love the '90s. He co-starred on the 2007 HBO series John from Cincinnati, which lasted one season.

In early 2008, Guzmán starred in "Naturally Aged Cheddar Hunks" TV ads for Cabot Creamery. He also appeared in the music video "Yes We Can." In 2010, he starred in HBO's How to Make It in America and appeared in a comical series of Snickers commercials that played during that year's Super Bowl.

== Personal life ==
Guzmán married Angelita Galarza in 1985. Their first son had died during childbirth, and that, alongside his frustration at social work, persuaded Guzmán to act full-time. This also made them adopt their next three children, Cemí, Clara, and Margarita, starting from 1991. Later, the couple had a daughter, Luna.

Their youngest daughter, Yamaya, is a social media influencer.

Guzmán resides in Cabot, Vermont.

Guzmán endorsed Senator Bernie Sanders for President in the 2016 U.S. presidential election.

In 2018, Guzmán, along with New York Yankees all-star Bernie Williams, appeared in a season six episode of Jon Taffer's Bar Rescue, offering assistance to the El Krajo Tavern in Loiza and the town's community centre, after it was devastated from Hurricane Maria.

During Telegramgate, Guzmán was interviewed by MSNBC for his opinions on the situation in Puerto Rico and he expressed that "Ricky had to go" and that corruption on the island was a major problem that he hoped would be solved.

In an interview with The Rich Eisen Show, Guzmán claimed he is frequently mistaken for actor Rick Aviles, who played the killer "Willie Lopez" in the film Ghost (1990) and was also Puerto Rican (but died in 1995).

== Filmography ==
=== Film ===
Year	Title	Role	Notes
1977	Short Eyes	Prisoner	
1983	Variety	Jose	
1986	Seven Women, Seven Sins	Lotto Man	
1986	No Picnic	Arroyo	
1987	Heartbeat	Gang Member #2	Video
1987	Batteries Not Included	Bystander	
1988	Crocodile Dundee II	Jose	
1989	True Believer	Ortega	
1989	Rooftops	Martinez	
1989	Black Rain	Frankie	
1989	Family Business	Julio Torres	
1990	Q&A	Detective Valentin	
1991	The Hard Way	Detective Benny Poole, NYPD	
1991	McBain	Papo	
1992	Innocent Blood	Morales	
1992	Jumpin' at the Boneyard	Taxi Driver	
1993	Guilty as Sin	Detective Martinez	
1993	Naked in New York	Auditioner	
1993	Mr. Wonderful	Juice	
1993	Carlito's Way	Pachanga	
1994	Hand Gun	Rick	
1994	The Cowboy Way	Chango	
1995	Lotto Land	Ricki	
1995	Stonewall	Vito	
1996	The Substitute	"Rem"	
1997	The Brave	Luis	
1997	Boogie Nights	Maurice t.t. Rodriguez	
1998	Out of Sight	Chino	
1998	Snake Eyes	Cyrus, Drug Dealer	
1998	One Tough Cop	Gunman Papi	
1999	The Limey	Eduardo Roel	
1999	The Bone Collector	Eddie Ortiz	
1999	Magnolia	Luis	
2000	Table One	Xavier	
2000	Luckytown	Jimmy	
2000	Traffic	DEA Agent Ray Castro	
2001	Double Whammy	Juan Benitez	
2001	Sam the Man	Murray	
2001	Home Invaders	Peligro	
2002	The Count of Monte Cristo	Jacopo	
2002	The Salton Sea	Quincy	
2002	Punch-Drunk Love	Lance	
2002	Welcome to Collinwood	Cosimo	
2002	The Adventures of Pluto Nash	Felix Laranga	
2003	Confidence	Officer Omar Manzano	
2003	Anger Management	Lou	
2003	Dumb and Dumberer: When Harry Met Lloyd	Ray Christmas	
2003	Runaway Jury	Jerry Hernandez	
2004	Lemony Snicket's A Series of Unfortunate Events	Bald Man	
2005	Dreamer	Balon	
2005	Carlito's Way: Rise to Power	"Nacho" Reyes	Video
2005	Waiting...	Raddimus	
2006	Disappearances	Brother St. Hilaire	
2006	Fast Food Nation	Benny	
2006	School for Scoundrels	Sergeant Moorehead	
2006	Hard Luck	"Million Dollar" Mendez	Video
2006	Lolo's Cafe	Lolo (voice)	Short
2007	Maldeamores	Ismael	
2007	War (alternate: Rogue Assassin)	Benny	
2007	Cleaner	Detective James "Jim" Vargas	
2008	I Kicked Luis Guzman in the Face	Luis	Short
2008	Chicano Blood	Mexican Mule #1	Video
2008	Beverly Hills Chihuahua	Chucho (voice)	
2008	Nothing like the Holidays	Johnny	
2008	Yes Man	Jumper	
2009	He's Just Not That Into You	Javier	
2009	Still Waiting...	Raddimus	Video
2009	Fighting	Martinez	
2009	The Taking of Pelham 123	Phil Ramos	
2009	Old Dogs	Nick	
2011	Arthur	Bitterman	
2011	The Caller	George	
2011	Rise of the Damned	Ramon	
2012	Journey 2: The Mysterious Island	Gabato Laguatan	
2012	Departure Date	Frank	Short
2013	The Last Stand	Deputy Mike Figuerola	
2013	Turbo	Angelo (voice)	
2013	We're the Millers	Mexican Cop	
2014	Two Men in Town	Terence	
2014	In the Blood	Chief Ramón Garza	
2014	The Lookalike	Vincent	
2014	Henry & Me	Vernon "Lefty" Gomez (voice)	
2014	Top Five	Bobby the Cop	
2014	Reclaim	Superintendent	
2015	Don Quixote	Farmer	
2015	Ana Maria in Novela Land	Licenciado Schmidt	
2015	Puerto Ricans in Paris	Luis	
2016	Keanu	Bacon	
2016	The Do-Over	Jorge the Shooter Boy	
2016	Aztec Warrior	Aztec Warrior	
2017	Sandy Wexler	Oscar	
2017	Literally, Right Before Aaron	Federico	
2017	9/11	Eddie	
2018	The Padre	Gaspar	
2018	Belleville Cop	Ricardo Garcia	
2018	The Duck	Leonard	Short
2019	Hold On	Pastor Rivera	
2021	Lady of the Manor	Wally	
2021	The Birthday Cake	Jochee	
2022	18 & Over	JazzyLou	
2022	Entergalactic	Huge Mover (voice)	
2022	The Disappearance of Toby Blackwood	Chester Mendoza	
2023	Story Ave	Luis Torres	
2023	You Are So Not Invited to My Bat Mitzvah	Eli Katz	
2023	Genie	Perez	
2024	Beverly Hills Cop: Axel F	Chalino Valdemoro	
2025	Havoc	Raul	
2025	Guns Up	Ignatius Locke	
2025	Out of Order	Gustav	
2026	The Super Mario Galaxy Movie	Wart (voice)	
2026	Coyote vs. Acme	Judge Troppogrosso	Filmed in 2023

=== Television ===
Year	Title	Role	Notes
1985	The Equalizer	Gypsy Cabbie	Episode: "The Lock Box"
1985–1986	Miami Vice	Miguel Revilla / Goon #1	Episode: "The Prodigal Son" & "Free Verse"
1990	Hunter	Carlos Delgado	Episode: "La Familia"
1991	Monsters	Luis	Episode: "Desirable Alien"
1991	Law & Order	Cesar Pescador	Episode: "Heaven"
1992	To Catch a Killer	Waiter	TV movie
1992	Quiet Killer	Adelaido Ortiz	TV movie
1992	In The Shadow of a Killer	Louis Velazquez	TV movie
1992	Empire City	-	TV movie
1992	Civil Wars	Hector Rodriguez	Episode: "Tape Fear"
1993	Homicide: Life on the Street	Lorenzo Molera	Episode: "Son of a Gun"
1993	Walker, Texas Ranger	Gomez	Episode: "Storm Warning"
1993	NYPD Blue	Hector Martinez	Episode: "Emission Accomplished" & "Ice Follies"
1993	Double Deception	Ronald Sharkey	TV movie
1994	seaQuest DSV	General Guzmano	Episode: "The Good Death"
1994	The Burning Season	Estate Boss	TV movie
1995	House of Buggin'	Various Roles	Main cast
1995–1996	New York Undercover	Detective Lopez / Joaquin	Episode: "Bad Girls" & "Deep Cover"
1996	On Seventh Avenue	Eddie Diaz	TV movie
1997	Pronto	Buck Torres	TV movie
1998	Early Edition	John Hernandez	Episode: "The Quality of Mercy"
1998	Michael Hayes	Santos	Episode: "Vaughn Mowery"
1998	Trinity	-	Episode: "In a Yellow Wood"
1998–2000	Oz	Raoul "El Cid" Hernandez	Recurring cast (season 2–4)
1999	Mind Prey	Detective Black	TV movie
2000	The Huntress	Paulie Dortmunder	Episode: "Pilot"
2000	The Beat	-	Episodes: "Cueca Solo"
2000	Thin Air	Chollo	TV movie
2001	Weakest Link	Himself	Episode: "Scene Stealers Edition"
2002	Frasier	George	Episode: "Enemy at the Gate"
2003	I Love the '70s	Himself	Episode: "1973"
2003	I Love the '80s Strikes Back	Himself	Episode: "1985"
2003	Luis	Luis Cortez	Main cast
2004	I Love the '90s	Himself	Episode: "1993"
2005	The Drop	Himself	Episode: "Episode #2.44"
2005	I Love the '80s 3-D	Himself	Episode: "1981" & "1983"
2006	I Love the '70s: Volume 2	Himself	Episode: "1974"
2007	John from Cincinnati	Ramon Gaviota	Main cast
2008	Free Radio	Himself	Episode: "Moron in the Morning"
2008	I Love the New Millennium	Himself	Episode: "2001" & "2006-2007"
2010–2011	How to Make It in America	Rene Calderon	Main cast
2011	Community	Himself	Episode: "Documentary Filmmaking: Redux"
2013	Republic of Doyle	Charles Alomar	Episode: "The Devil Inside"
2014	Mind Games	Nate	Recurring Cast
2015	Narcos	José Gonzalo Rodríguez Gacha	Recurring cast (season 1)
2015–2018	Code Black	Jesse Salander	Main cast
2016	Roadies	"Gooch"	Recurring cast
2018	Drop the Mic	Himself	Episode: "Luis Guzman vs. Gabriel Iglesias & Charli XCX vs. Tove Lo"
2018	Bar Rescue	Himself	Episode: "Operation: Puerto Rico"
2018	What's Good in Your Hood?	Himself	Episode: "Casa Adela"
2019	Perpetual Grace, LTD	Hector Contreras	Main cast
2019	Godfather of Harlem	Alejandro "El Guapo" Villabuena	Recurring cast (season 1)
2019	Shameless	Mikey O'Shea	Recurring cast (season 9–10)
2020	The Eric Andre Show	Himself	Episode: "Named After My Dad's P*nis"
2020	Louey & Bri TV	Various	Main cast
2021	Ultra City Smiths	Rodrigo Smalls (voice)	Main cast
2021	Hightown	Jorge Cuevas	Recurring cast (season 2)
2022	The Resort	Illan Iberra	Episode: "Hünch Fò Llub Seeth"
2022–present	Wednesday	Gomez Addams	Main Role
2023	Poker Face	Raoul	Episode: "The Orpheus Syndrome"
2023	Moon Girl and Devil Dinosaur	President Council Peña (voice)	Episode: "Like Mother, Like Moon Girl"
2023	Justified: City Primeval	Officer Ramirez	Episode: "The Question"

=== Video games ===
Year	Title	Role	Notes
2002	Grand Theft Auto: Vice City	Ricardo Díaz	
2006	Grand Theft Auto: Vice City Stories	Ricardo Díaz	
2021	Grand Theft Auto: The Trilogy – The Definitive Edition	Ricardo Díaz	Archival recordings Remaster of Grand Theft Auto: Vice City only

=== Music videos ===
Year	Title	Role	Artist(s)
2002	"Undisputed"	Prisoner	Cash Money Millionaires
2013	"Gorilla"	Strip Zoo Owner	Bruno Mars
2017	"1-800-273-8255"	Track Coach	Logic (ft. Alessia Cara & Khalid)
2018	"Está Rico"	Gambler	Marc Anthony, Will Smith & Bad Bunny

== Awards and nominations ==
Year	Awards	Category	Recipient	Outcome
1998	Florida Film Critics Circle Award	Florida Film Critics Circle Award for Best Cast	Boogie Nights	Won
1998	Screen Actors Guild Award	Screen Actors Guild Award for Outstanding Performance by a Cast in a Motion Picture	Boogie Nights	Nominated
2000	Independent Spirit Award	Independent Spirit Award for Best Supporting Male	The Limey	Nominated
2000	Awards Circuit Community Awards	Awards Circuit Community Awards Best Cast Ensemble	Magnolia	Won
2000	Florida Film Critics Circle Award	Florida Film Critics Circle Award for Best Cast	Magnolia	Won
2000	Screen Actors Guild Award	Screen Actors Guild Award for Outstanding Performance by a Cast in a Motion Picture	Magnolia	Nominated
2001	Screen Actors Guild Award	Screen Actors Guild Award for Outstanding Performance by a Cast in a Motion Picture	Traffic	Won
2003	Imagen Awards	Imagen Award Best Supporting Actor	Punch-Drunk Love	Won
2008	Imagen Awards	Imagen Award for Best Actor	Maldeamores	Won
2010	ALMA Awards	ALMA Award for Best Supporting Actor	The Taking of Pelham 123	Nominated
2011	NAMIC Visions Awards	NAMIC Visions Awards Best Performance in a Comedy	How to Make It in America	Won

== See also ==
- List of Puerto Ricans
