= I Love the '80s =

I Love the '80s may refer to:

- I Love the '80s (British TV series), a BBC series examining the pop culture of the decade
- I Love the '80s (American TV series), a VH1 series based on the British series
- I Love the '80s Strikes Back, a follow-up to the VH1 series
- I Love the '80s 3-D, a second follow-up to the VH1 series
