= Best of I Love the... =

2010 TV programme

- Genre: Documentary
- Narrated by: Doug Jeffers
- Original language: English
- No. of seasons: 1
- No. of episodes: 6

Production
- Running time: 60 minutes

Original release
- Network: VH1
- Release: February 20, 2010

Related
- I Love the '70s (British version); I Love the '80s (British version); I Love the '90s (British version); I Love the '80s (American version); I Love the '70s (American version); I Love the '80s Strikes Back; I Love the '90s (American version); I Love the '90s: Part Deux; I Love the '80s 3-D; I Love the Holidays; I Love Toys; I Love the '70s: Volume 2 I Love the New Millennium; I Love the 2000s

Best of I Love the... is the eleventh installment of the I Love the... series and a series of compilation specials composed of various clips from VH1's I Love the... series. It first aired on VH1 on February 20, 2010, with "Best of I Love the 70s" in hour 1, and ended with "Best of I Love the 90s" in hour 2.

The clips featured in these episodes were mostly easy to license. Most of the music that had been used in the clips in their original broadcasts were replaced with generic music tracks.

== Commentators ==
- Commentators of I Love the '70s
- Commentators of I Love the '70s: Volume 2
- Commentators of I Love the '80s
- Commentators of I Love the '80s Strikes Back
- Commentators of I Love the '80s 3-D
- Commentators of I Love the '90s
- Commentators of I Love the '90s: Part Deux

== Best of I Love the '70s ==
Hour 1

- Welcome Back, Kotter
- Kiss
- Shrinky Dinks
- Metrication in the United States
- The Dating Game
- "Free Bird" by Lynyrd Skynyrd
- Lite-Brite
- Bell-bottoms
- Studio 54
- The Hollywood Squares
- "Da Ya Think I'm Sexy?" by Rod Stewart
- Bedazzler
- Pop Rocks
- Josie and the Pussycats and Josie and the Pussycats in Outer Space
- Wonder Woman
- Tab
- Ginsu
- Hank Aaron
- The Gong Show
- Hot pants
- Disco Demolition Night
- Rock 'n' Roll High School

Hour 2

- Donny and Marie
- Are You There, God? It's Me, Margaret by Judy Blume
- 8 Track
- View-Master
- Billy Beer
- One Day at a Time
- United States Bicentennial
- Up In Smoke
- Mood ring
- Mister Rogers' Neighborhood
- "The Hustle" by Van McCoy and the dance craze
- Pong
- Leisure suit
- Baby Alive
- Password
- Pet Rock
- K-Tel
- Sea Monkeys
- CB radios
- The Shazam!/Isis Hour
- Mr. Whipple
- Skateboard craze
- Big Wheel
- Smokey and the Bandit

== Best of I Love the '80s ==
Hour 1

- Gremlins
- Miracle on Ice
- "Walk Like an Egyptian" by The Bangles
- Hungry Hungry Hippos
- Members Only
- Breakdancing and Breakin'
- The Day After
- "Land of Confusion" by Genesis
- Wacky WallWalker
- Teddy Ruxpin
- "Where's the beef?"
- "Somebody's Watching Me" by Rockwell
- Pac-Man and Ms. Pac-Man
- Big hair
- "Don't You Want Me" by The Human League
- "Just a Friend" by Biz Markie
- Press Your Luck
- Game Boy and Tetris
- Sunglasses
- 1986 World Series and the Bill Buckner fielding error
- "Whip It" by Devo
- Rubik's Cube
- Lee Press-On nails
- Back to the Future

Hour 2

- Atari
- Richard Simmons
- "If I Could Turn Back Time" by Cher
- The party line
- The Royal Wedding
- "All Night Long (All Night)" by Lionel Richie
- Monster trucks
- Scratch and sniff and Trapper Keeper
- MacGyver
- Mullets
- "Pass the Dutchie" by Musical Youth
- Dungeons & Dragons
- Teen Wolf
- "Super Freak" by Rick James
- The fall of the Berlin Wall
- Grey Poupon
- Truly Tasteless Jokes
- Small Wonder
- Valley girl
- "Mickey" by Toni Basil
- My Buddy
- E.T. the Extra-Terrestrial

== Best of I Love the '90s ==
Hour 1

- Ally McBeal
- Raves
- Oakland Ebonics controversy
- Kenny G breaks the world record for longest note held
- Reality Bites
- The Clinton–Lewinsky scandal
- "The Humpty Dance" by Digital Underground
- Fanny packs
- Run Lola Run
- "Rico Suave" by Gerardo
- Mark McGwire vs. Sammy Sosa
- Fabio
- The Dream Team
- Moviefone
- Blues Traveler
- Provocative ads for Guess
- Zima
- Where's Waldo?
- "Tubthumping" by Chumbawamba
- Supermarket Sweep
- Ghost

Hour 2

- Melrose Place
- Kerri Strug
- Jewel
- Caller ID
- Ross Perot
- The Wonderbra
- The Caesar haircut
- Planet Hollywood
- Jenny McCarthy
- Dolly the sheep
- Energizer Bunny
- ThighMaster
- George Foreman's comeback
- Hootie and the Blowfish
- George H.W. Bush vomits on Japan's prime minister
- Zubaz
- MTV's guest VJ Jesse Camp
- Benedictine Monks' Chant album
- Starter Jackets and Pagers
- Singles

Preceded by I Love the New Millennium	Best of I Love the...	Next: I Love the 2000s
