= I Love the '70s =

I Love the '70s may refer to:

- I Love the '70s (British TV series), a BBC series examining the pop culture of the decade
- I Love the '70s (American TV series), a VH1 series based on the British series
- I Love the '70s: Volume 2, a follow-up to the VH1 series
