= I Love the '90s: Part Deux =

2005 American TV series

- Genre: Documentary
- Presented by: Doug Jeffers
- Country of origin: United States
- Original language: English
- No. of seasons: 1
- No. of episodes: 10

Production
- Running time: 42 min.

Original release
- Network: VH1
- Release: January 17 – January 21, 2005

Related
- I Love the '70s (British version); I Love the '80s (British version); I Love the '90s (British version); I Love the '80s (American version); I Love the '70s (American version); I Love the '80s Strikes Back; I Love the '90s (American version); I Love the '80s 3-D; I Love the Holidays; I Love Toys; I Love the '70s: Volume 2 I Love the New Millennium; Best of I Love the... I Love the 2000s

I Love the '90s: Part Deux is a television mini-series and the fifth installment of the I Love... series on VH1 about 1990s culture with 10 episodes. It premiered on January 17, 2005. This series is a sequel to I Love the '90s.

== Recurring segments ==
- Raw: Each commentator gives their opinion on a topic that was covered by each year.
- Ben Stein's Pimpest Tracks: Ben Stein presents a list of the popular rap songs of the year.
- Jay & Silent Bob's Guys We'll Go Gay For: Jay and Silent Bob present a list of male celebrities or fictional characters from each year.
- Bootyfone: Russ Leatherman lists the three songs most conducive to a romantic environment.
- Andrea's 90210 Lost Diary: A summary of the events in Beverly Hills, 90210 is read from a journal, ostensibly from the point of view of Andrea Zuckerman.
- College Radio Cut: A. Jay and Jeremy Popoff discuss the college rock song of the year.
- Then and Now: Emma Bunton presents a comparison of trends in the given year and the present day.

== Topics covered by year ==
=== 1990 ===
- Misery
- Supermarket Sweep
- "Poison" by Bell Biv DeVoe
- Fanny packs
- Nelson
- 2 Live Crew
- MTV Unplugged
- "Opposites Attract" by Paula Abdul
- Dolphin-safe tuna
- Mike Tyson loses to Buster Douglas
- Days of Thunder
- The Fresh Prince of Bel-Air
- Dick Tracy/"Vogue" by Madonna
- Moscow gets its first McDonald's
- Cop Rock
- Caller ID
- Total Recall and Kindergarten Cop

Raw: Michael Ian Black on '90s fans

Ben Stein's Pimpest Tracks of 1990: "911 is a Joke" by Public Enemy, "100 Miles and Runnin'" by N.W.A and "I Left My Wallet in El Segundo" by A Tribe Called Quest

Jay & Silent Bob's Guys We'll Go Gay For in 1990: Arnold Schwarzenegger and Kiefer Sutherland

Bootyfone 1990: "Come Back to Me" by Janet Jackson, "Close to You" by Maxi Priest and "All I Wanna Do Is Make Love to You" by Heart

Andrea's 90210 Lost Diary of 1990: October 4, 1990 (Season 1) – "Dear Diary – Today, two new twins, Brandon and Brenda Walsh, started West Beverly. They're from Minnesota and clueless. Brandon asked to work on the school paper. I wanted to tell him to work on those sideburns first and then me, but I have an image to uphold and everyone buys it. Suckers! Peace out!"

College Radio Cut of 1990: "The Summer" by Yo La Tengo

Then and Now 1990: Then - Donald Trump & Marla Maples / Now - Donald Trump & Melania Knauss, Then - Portable CD Players / Now - iPods, and Then - Vanilla Ice / Now - Eminem

=== 1991 ===
- Robin Hood: Prince of Thieves
- Planet Hollywood
- David Duke (former head of the Ku Klux Klan) runs for governor of Louisiana
- "Bring Tha Noize" by Anthrax and Public Enemy
- Lollapalooza
- Jungle Fever
- Dissolution of the Soviet Union
- Terminator 2: Judgment Day
- "Wicked Game" by Chris Isaak (originally released in 1989)
- The Atlanta Braves tomahawk chop controversy
- Starter Jackets and Pagers (and their use for numeric spelling)
- "Give It Away" by Red Hot Chili Peppers
- Wilt Chamberlain's controversial autobiography A View From Above
- "More Than Words" by Extreme
- Rugrats
- Cape Fear

Raw: Michael Ian Black on Wilt Chamberlain

Ben Stein's Pimpest Tracks of 1991: "Summertime" by DJ Jazzy Jeff & The Fresh Prince, "Can't Truss It" by Public Enemy and "Jackin' for Beats" by Ice Cube^{[B]}

Jay & Silent Bob's Guys We'll Go Gay For in 1991: Val Kilmer and Kevin Costner

Bootyfone 1991: "I Adore Mi Amor" by Color Me Badd, "I Can't Wait Another Minute" by Hi-Five and "Because I Love You" by Stevie B

Andrea's 90210 Lost Diary of 1991: December 12, 1991 (Season 2) – "Dear Diary – Today, Brenda lost her virginity to that James Dean poser Dylan and he's even older than me. What is he, like, 37? I hate Emily Valentine. She slipped Brandon some U4EA the other night. How lame is that? Come on, Brando, I am the real deal. And Donna scored a 620 on her SATs like she even knows how to spell SAT. What a bunch of dumb asses! Eat me!"

College Radio Cut of 1991: "Dirty Boots" by Sonic Youth

Then and Now 1991: Then - Joey Lawrence & Marky Mark and the Funky Bunch / Now - Joseph Lawrence & Mark Wahlberg, Then - Blossom / Now - The O.C., and Then - Elizabeth Taylor & Larry Fortensky / Now - Jennifer Lopez & Marc Anthony

=== 1992 ===
- The Crying Game
- American Gladiators
- ThighMaster
- "Jump Around" by House of Pain
- Singles
- Studs
- Men Are from Mars, Women Are from Venus by John Gray
- "To Be With You" by Mr. Big
- Nicotine patches
- Bill Clinton "didn't inhale"
- "Cop Killer" by Body Count
- Mad About You
- George H. W. Bush vomits on Kiichi Miyazawa
- Larry Bird retires
- Sinéad O'Connor rips a picture of Pope John Paul II on Saturday Night Live
- A League of Their Own
- Teen Talk Barbie
- Euro Disneyland
- Northern Exposure
- White Men Can't Jump

Raw: Hal Sparks on Bush barfs

Ben Stein's Pimpest Tracks of 1992: "Set Adrift on Memory Bliss" by P.M. Dawn,^{[D]} "Flavor of the Month" by Black Sheep^{[D]} and "They Want EFX" by Das EFX

Jay & Silent Bob's Guys We'll Go Gay For in 1992: Matt Dillon and Wesley Snipes

Bootyfone 1992: "Masterpiece" by Atlantic Starr, "Forever in Love" by Kenny G and "Save the Best for Last" by Vanessa Williams

Andrea's 90210 Lost Diary of 1992: November 4, 1992 (Season 3) – "Dear Diary – Thanks to a hit-and-run driver, I got two broken legs. Everyone thinks I'm upset because I might miss school. I hate everyone! Brenda sneaked down to Mexico with Dylan and then her father had to come down and bail her out at the border. I mean, really, who sneaks into Mexico? I'm outie!"

College Radio Cut of 1992: "Push th' Little Daisies" by Ween

Then and Now 1992: Then - The Tonight Show Starring Johnny Carson / Now - The Tonight Show with Jay Leno, Then - Sex by Madonna / Now - Kabbalah, and Then - "Baby Got Back" by Sir Mix-a-Lot / Now - "Lean Back" by Terror Squad

=== 1993 ===
- Cliffhanger
- Energizer Bunny
- "I'm Gonna Be (500 Miles)" by The Proclaimers
- Chicken Soup for the Soul
- "Don't ask, don't tell"
- Mrs. Doubtfire
- "Creep" by Radiohead
- Monica Seles gets stabbed
- Paintball
- Falling Down
- "Insane in the Brain" by Cypress Hill
- What's Eating Gilbert Grape
- Leprechaun
- Great Flood of 1993
- Frank Sinatra's Duets album
- Animaniacs
- Zima
- True Romance

Raw: Rachael Harris on Zima

Ben Stein's Pimpest Tracks of 1993: "Slam" by Onyx, "Passin' Me By" by The Pharcyde and "Rebirth of Slick" by Digable Planets^{[G]}

Jay & Silent Bob's Guys We'll Go Gay For in 1993: Sylvester Stallone and Robert Redford

Bootyfone 1993: "Knockin' Da Boots" by H-Town, "Again" by Janet Jackson and "One Last Cry" by Brian McKnight

Andrea's 90210 Lost Diary of 1993: May 7, 1993 (Season 3) – "Dear Diary – Quelle surprise! The West Beverly Class of '93 graduated with me as their valedictorian. Boring, so they say. Donna got drunk and wasn't allowed to participate in graduation. Then, all the idiots shouted 'Donna Martin graduates' and they let her. There must be a way to keep them off from reproducing. I'm outie, 5000!"

College Radio Cut of 1993: "My Name is Mud" by Primus

Then and Now 1993: Then - Lois & Clark: The New Adventures of Superman / Now - Smallville, Then - The Final Episode of Cheers / Now - The Final Episode of Friends, and Then - Mel Gibson directing The Man Without a Face / Now - Mel Gibson directing The Passion of the Christ

=== 1994 ===
- The Wonderbra
- Anna Nicole Smith marries J. Howard Marshall
- Tales from the Crypt
- The Cranberries
- The Club
- Michael Fay's caning
- Benedictine Monks' Chant album
- The Adventures of Priscilla, Queen of the Desert
- Models, Inc.
- Warehouse clubs
- "Loser" by Beck
- New York Rangers win the Stanley Cup
- Blues Traveler
- Clerks
- Tony Little
- Counting Crows
- Ricola
- Natural Born Killers

Raw: In Memory of Kurt Cobain (1967-1994)

Ben Stein's Pimpest Tracks of 1994: "Keep Ya Head Up" by 2Pac, "U.N.I.T.Y." by Queen Latifah and "Fantastic Voyage" by Coolio

Jay & Silent Bob's Guys We'll Go Gay For in 1994: Woody Harrelson and Dante or Randal

Bootyfone 1994: "Bump n' Grind" by R. Kelly, "I Wanna Be Down" by Brandy and "I Swear" by All-4-One

Andrea's 90210 Lost Diary of 1994: January 12, 1994 (Season 4) – "Dear Diary – Sweet! I lost my virginity and I am pregnant. Welcome to Edgeville, population: Andrea. Donna is really into that tough guy Ray Pruitt. I liked him better on 'The Heights'. How do you talk to an angel? Apparently in a whisper. I crack myself up. I'm out!"

College Radio Cut of 1994: "Cut Your Hair" by Pavement

Then and Now 1994: Then - The Lion King / Now - Shrek 2, Then - Oasis / Now - Coldplay, and Then - Bill Clinton wears boxers / Now - Bill Clinton needs bypass

=== 1995 ===
- The Usual Suspects
- Fashion Cafe
- "Boombastic" by Shaggy
- NewsRadio
- Species
- Psychic Friends Network
- Starbucks
- Mallrats
- Se7en
- Newt Gingrich vs. women in the military
- The hemp debate
- "This Is How We Do It" by Montell Jordan
- To Wong Foo, Thanks for Everything! Julie Newmar
- Babydoll dresses
- Moviefone
- Six Degrees of Kevin Bacon
- The trial of O. J. Simpson

Raw: Juliette Lewis on Shaggy

Ben Stein's Pimpest Tracks of 1995: "Player's Anthem" by Junior M.A.F.I.A., "I Wish" by Skee-Lo and "Big Poppa" by Notorious B.I.G.

Jay & Silent Bob's Guys We'll Go Gay For in 1995: Patrick Swayze and Tom Hanks

Bootyfone 1995: "Water Runs Dry" by Boyz II Men, "Candy Rain" by Soul 4 Real and "Brown Sugar" by D'Angelo

Andrea's 90210 Lost Diary of 1995: May 24, 1995 (Season 5) – "Dear Diary – I am finally going off to Yale. Anyway, Dylan married the daughter of his father's murderer and then she was murdered by her father's hitmen who were actually trying to kill Dylan. Can you say ratings? Also, Ray threw Donna down the stairs and she forgave him. Probably belted out a few bars of 'hold on' so played out. I miss them already. Later!"

College Radio Cut of 1995: "Seether" by Veruca Salt

Then and Now 1995: Then - Elijah Wood in North / Now - Elijah Wood in The Lord of the Rings trilogy, Then - David Letterman getting flashed by Drew Barrymore on Late Show with David Letterman / Now - David Letterman getting flashed by Courtney Love on Late Show with David Letterman, and Then - Internet access / Now - DSL

=== 1996 ===
- Kerri Strug
- The Crocodile Hunter
- Romeo + Juliet
- The Caesar haircut
- Jeff Foxworthy's redneck routine
- "Woo Hah!! Got You All in Check" by Busta Rhymes
- Pamela Anderson and Tommy Lee's sex tape
- Deion "Primetime" Sanders
- East Coast-West Coast hip hop rivalry
- Jenny McCarthy
- David Crosby fathers Melissa Etheridge's child
- "I Believe I Can Fly" by R. Kelly
- The Unabomber
- Michael Flatley
- 7th Heaven
- Evita

Raw: Modern Humorist on Kerri

Ben Stein's Pimpest Tracks of 1996: "Sure Shot" by Beastie Boys, "California Love" by 2Pac feat. Dr. Dre and "Tha Crossroads" by Bone Thugs-n-Harmony

Jay & Silent Bob's Guys We'll Go Gay For in 1996: Leonardo DiCaprio and Ving Rhames

Bootyfone 1996: "Don't Let Go (Love)" by En Vogue, "You're Makin Me High" by Toni Braxton and "No Diggity" by Blackstreet

Andrea's 90210 Lost Diary of 1996: May 22, 1996 (Season 6) – "Dear Diary – Donna started dating Cliff the Fireman even though she still loves David, who inherited a ton of money and became manic depressive. Of course, he's the whitest rapper ever. Anyway, Steve finally told Kelly he started the high school rumors that she was a slut. I just love that Steve! Rather see you than be you!"

College Radio Cut of 1996: "What I Got" by Sublime

Then and Now 1996: Then - Gwyneth Paltrow & Brad Pitt / Now - Gwyneth Paltrow & Apple Martin, Then - Dominique Moceanu, 4'4" / Now - Dominique Moceanu, 5'3", and Then - The Rosie O'Donnell Show / Now - The Ellen DeGeneres Show

=== 1997 ===
- Air Force One
- Kenny G breaks the world record for longest note held
- "Bitch" by Meredith Brooks
- "Death" of Joe Camel
- Con Air
- The beginning of ratings for TV shows (e.g. "TV-MA", "TV-14", "TV-PG")
- "Sex and Candy" by Marcy Playground
- Latrell Sprewell chokes his coach and Marv Albert bites his girlfriend
- The death of Chris Farley
- Mary Kay Letourneau
- The WNBA
- "Fly" by Sugar Ray
- Starship Troopers
- Pokémon
- Barbie and Paula Jones get makeovers
- G.I. Jane
- Titanic

Raw: Patrice O'Neal on Marv Albert

Ben Stein's Pimpest Tracks of 1997: "Let Me Clear My Throat" by DJ Kool, "Been Around the World" by Puff Daddy & the Family and "No Diggity" by Blackstreet

Jay & Silent Bob's Guys We'll Go Gay For in 1997: Harrison Ford and George Clooney

Bootyfone 1997: "You Make Me Wanna" by Usher, "In My Bed" by Dru Hill and "Nobody" by Keith Sweat

Andrea's 90210 Lost Diary of 1997: May 21, 1997 (Season 7) – "Dear Diary – Well, here's what's been going on in Beverly Hills, 90210 since I've been in New Haven, 06520. Brandon turned down a Seattle Times job offer so he could be editor of Steve's Springs paper handout Beverly thief. Donna was held hostage by a stalker, caught her mother cheating again, and finally lost her virginity to David. I can't believe she lost it to '97. Later!"

College Radio Cut of 1997: "All Is Full of Love" by Björk

Then and Now 1997: Then - Live with Regis and Kathie Lee / Now - Live with Regis and Kelly, Then - Flavored Vodkas / Now - Vodka & Red Bull, and Then - Barbie gets a makeover / Now - Barbie & Ken are no longer together

=== 1998 ===
- Godzilla (American Version)
- Geri Halliwell leaves the Spice Girls
- "Thank U" by Alanis Morissette
- Raves
- Blade
- Buffy the Vampire Slayer
- Lay's WOW chips
- Mad cow disease
- Urban Legend
- Gary Coleman punches a fan named Tracy Fields
- Jesse Camp
- "Ghetto Supastar (That Is What You Are)" by Pras
- The Waterboy
- Behind the Music
- "Smack My Bitch Up" by The Prodigy
- Naomi Campbell throws a cell phone at an assistant
- El Niño
- Run Lola Run

Raw: Michael Ian Black on Raves

Ben Stein's Pimpest Tracks of 1998: "I Got the Hook Up" by Master P, "Find A Way" by A Tribe Called Quest and "Intergalactic" by Beastie Boys

Jay & Silent Bob's Guys We'll Go Gay For in 1998: Adam Sandler and Kevin Bacon

Bootyfone 1998: "Lately" by Divine, "All My Life" by K-Ci & JoJo and "The Boy Is Mine" by Brandy & Monica

Andrea's 90210 Lost Diary of 1998: April 15, 1998 (Season 8) – "Dear Diary – Just got back from the Class of '93's fifth reunion. Can you believe it? Sure, I'm getting divorced, but at least I'm not blonde. Wait, maybe I am. Help! Kelly's addicted to coke, Donna's hooked on painkillers, and Dylan's back on the H. Just say no, people. Just say no. Tears!"

College Radio Cut of 1998: "Sexy Boy" by Air

Then and Now 1998: Then - Viagra / Now - Viagra & Levitra, Then - Bill Clinton & Monica Lewinsky / Now - Jim McGreevey & Golan Cipel, and Then - Saving Private Ryan / Now - Lynndie England

=== 1999 ===
- Freaks and Geeks
- Chris Gaines (the alterego of Garth Brooks)
- TRL
- "Hard Knock Life" by Jay-Z
- Emeril
- Red Bull
- Lance Armstrong
- Matthew McConaughey arrested for public disturbance (and is found playing the bongos naked)
- Cruel Intentions
- Limp Bizkit
- SpongeBob SquarePants
- The Tom Green Show
- Win Ben Stein's Money
- Being John Malkovich
- Varsity Blues

Raw: Juliette Lewis on Jay-Z

Ben Stein's Pimpest Tracks of 1999: "Can I Get A..." by Jay-Z, "Party Up" by DMX and "Love Is Blind" by Eve

Jay & Silent Bob's Guys We'll Go Gay For in 1999: James Van Der Beek and Jason Biggs

Bootyfone 1999: "Angel of Mine" by Monica, "Back at One" by Brian McKnight and "The Hardest Thing" by 98 Degrees

Andrea's 90210 Lost Diary of 1999: November 17, 1999 (Season 10) – "Dear Diary – Oh, well, yeah, I'm still a single mom working full-time and I've been at Yale since George Bush was. Dylan broke into the house of the guy who killed his father and wife, turned out the dad killed himself, like, 4 years ago. Dylan held the new occupant at gunpoint anyway. Oh, he's fun. Donna found out that her bulimic cousin Gina is actually her sister because her dad slept with her aunt, of course. Whatever!"

College Radio Cut of 1999: "My Own Worst Enemy" by Lit

Then and Now 1999: Then - Pokémon / Now - Yu-Gi-Oh!, Then - Governor Jesse Ventura / Now - Governor Arnold Schwarzenegger, and Then - Destiny's Child / Now – Beyoncé

| Preceded by I Love the '90s (American version) | I Love the '90s: Part Deux | Next: I Love the '80s 3-D |
