= I Love the Holidays =

2005 American TV series

- Genre: Documentary
- Narrated by: Doug Jeffers
- Composer: Rob Cairns
- Country of origin: United States
- Original language: English

Production
- Executive producers: Karla Hidalgo; Meredith Ross; Michael Hirschorn; Shelly Tatro
- Producer: Pat Twist
- Editor: Emad Abi-Hashim
- Running time: 64 min.

Original release
- Network: VH1
- Release: November 20, 2005

Related
- I Love the '70s (British version); I Love the '80s (British version); I Love the '90s (British version); I Love the '80s (American version); I Love the '70s (American version); I Love the '80s Strikes Back; I Love the '90s (American version); I Love the '90s: Part Deux; I Love the '80s 3-D; I Love Toys; I Love the '70s: Volume 2 I Love the New Millennium; Best of I Love the... I Love the 2000s

I Love the Holidays is a television special and the seventh installment of the I Love... series that premiered on VH1 on November 20, 2005. It follows the same format as VH1's I Love..., with commentators talking about the holidays.

== Commentators ==
- Carlos Alazraqui
- Antigone Rising (Cassidy and Kristen Henderson)
- Biz Markie
- Michael Ian Black
- Chris Booker
- Rabbi Shmuley Boteach
- Bow Wow Wow (Leigh Gorman and Annabella Lwin)
- Michael Bublé
- Charo
- Santa Claus
- Jennifer Elise Cox
- Molly Culver
- Stephanie D'Abruzzo
- Rocco Dispirito
- The Donnas (Allison Robertson and Maya Ford)
- Simon Doonan
- Bil Dwyer
- Nicole Eggert
- Rich Eisen
- Elvira
- Greg Fitzsimmons
- Tyler Florence
- Jake Fogelnest
- Godfrey
- Elon Gold
- Genevieve Gorder
- Gilbert Gottfried
- Erin Gray
- Luis Guzman
- Rachael Harris
- Marilu Henner
- Mark Hoppus
- Clint Howard
- Scott Ian
- Invisible Man
- Ron Jeremy
- Chris Jericho
- Jake Johannsen
- Jo Koy
- Loni Love
- Stephen Lynch
- Elf Mackenzie
- Kathleen Madigan
- Debbie Matenopoulos
- Edwin McCain
- Jay McCarroll
- Darryl McDaniels
- John Melendez
- Modern Humorist
- Billy Morrison
- Jason Mraz
- Mummy
- Nelson
- Graham Norton
- Patrice O'Neal
- Megyn Price
- Rachel Quaintance
- Mo Rocca
- Darius Rucker
- Dave "Snake" Sabo
- Stuart Scott
- Willard Scott
- Sherri Shepherd
- Brad Sherwood
- Dee Snider
- Rick Springfield
- Joel Stein
- French Stewart
- Brenda Strong
- Alan Thicke
- Turkey
- Frank Vincent
- John Waters
- Evan Wecksell
- Lauren Weedman
- Kevin Weisman
- Wil Wheaton
- Andrew W.K.
- Chris Wylde
- "Weird Al" Yankovic
- Cedric Yarbrough
- Zero Boy

== Recurring segments ==
- Yule Log: Three yule logs are presented but are interrupted by three Christmas songs.
- Weird Al's Holiday Survival Guide: "Weird Al" Yankovic presents the survival guides for Halloween, Thanksgiving, Hanukkah, Christmas and New Year's.
- Holiday Cheer from Patrice O'Neal: Patrice O'Neal wears an "arrow through the head".
- Santa Does Stand-Up: Santa Claus tells jokes about Christmas.

== List of ideas and events ==
- It's a Wonderful Life
- Hell Night
- "The Chanukah Song" by Adam Sandler
- Macy's Thanksgiving Day Parade
- Halloween (previously discussed on I Love the '70s)
- Dreidels
- The First Thanksgiving
- It's the Great Pumpkin, Charlie Brown
- Hanukkah
- "Monster Mash" by Bobby "Boris" Pickett
- Rockefeller Center Christmas Tree
- How the Grinch Stole Christmas
- Elvira: Mistress of the Dark
- "Feliz Navidad" by José Feliciano
- Black Friday
- Halloween costumes
- Monsters (specifically the Invisible Man, werewolves, mummies, Frankenstein and Dracula)
- Fruitcake
- Latkes
- Annual presidential turkey pardon
- The Rockettes
- Thanksgiving Day (specifically turkeys, yams, stuffing, mashed potatoes, gravy, deviled eggs, macaroni, meatballs, lasagna, salad, cranberry sauce, tofurkey and turducken)
- Witches
- "Christmas in Hollis" by Run-D.M.C.
- New Year's Eve (specifically New Year's parties, New Year's resolutions, New Year's Eve in Times Square, New Year's kiss and "Auld Lang Syne")

Yule Log #1: "White Christmas"

Surviving Halloween: Hell Night, Halloween candy and Halloween costumes

Surviving Thanksgiving: turkeys, stuffing and Black Friday

Yule Log #2: "The Christmas Song"

Surviving Hanukkah: dreidels, Hanukkah gelt and presents

Holiday Cheer: Arrow Through the Head

Surviving Christmas: eggnog, mistletoe, carolers and fruitcake

Yule Log #3: "Jingle Bells"

Surviving New Year's: alcoholic drinks, dating, countdowns and Dick Clark

Santa Does Stand-Up: The reindeer flying with rockets surgically attached to their feet, Santa Claus switching from leprechauns to elves, and elves making Santa Claus a teleporter

Preceded by I Love the '80s 3-D	I Love the Holidays	Next: I Love Toys
