= I Love Toys =

2006 American TV series

- Genre: Documentary
- Narrated by: Doug Jeffers
- Country of origin: United States
- Original language: English
- No. of seasons: 1
- No. of episodes: 5

Production
- Running time: 60 minutes (parts 1-4); 90 minutes (part 5)

Original release
- Network: VH1
- Release: March 6 – March 10, 2006

Related
- I Love the '70s (British version); I Love the '80s (British version); I Love the '90s (British version); I Love the '80s (American version); I Love the '70s (American version); I Love the '80s Strikes Back; I Love the '90s (American version); I Love the '90s: Part Deux; I Love the '80s 3-D; I Love the Holidays; I Love the '70s: Volume 2 I Love the New Millennium; Best of I Love the... I Love the 2000s

I Love Toys is a miniseries on VH1 and the eighth installment of the I Love the... series that premiered on March 6, 2006. It is a countdown of the 100 greatest toys, chosen partially through public voting on vh1.com and also consideration of "sales, historical significance and longevity," according to VH1.

Each day for 5 days, they would count down from 100 to 1, which is 20 toys per episode. Parts 1-4 were each one hour long, while Part 5 was a special 90-minute edition aired on March 10, 2006. As with the other nostalgia series, the program included commentary by various entertainers, including several who had appeared in most or all of the other shows, such as actor Michael Ian Black, comedian/actress Rachael Harris, Scientologist comedian Evan Wecksell and writer/satirist Mo Rocca.

Hasbro, Inc., turned the selection of a large number of its toys into a press release promoting the company.

== Commentators ==
- Carlos Alazraqui
- Ant
- Julissa Bermudez
- Michael Ian Black
- Chris Booker
- Bow Wow Wow
- Amanda Bynes
- The Click Five
- Jeff Cohen
- Rachael Leigh Cook
- Fred Coury
- Sunda Croonquist
- Molly Culver
- The Donnas (Brett Anderson and Maya Ford)
- Bil Dwyer
- Hallie Eisenberg
- Emme
- Greg Fitzsimmons
- Jake Fogelnest
- Drew Fraser
- Doug E. Fresh
- Godfrey
- Elon Gold
- Douglas Goldstein
- Genevieve Gorder
- Gilbert Gottfried
- Pete Gray
- Luis Guzman
- Rachael Harris
- Mark Hoppus
- Scott Ian
- Wendy Kaufman
- Jo Koy
- Ben Lee
- Rex Lee
- Lisa Lisa
- Beth Littleford
- Joe Lorge
- Loni Love
- Kathleen Madigan
- Mike Marino
- Biz Markie
- Ricky Martin
- Debbie Matenopoulos
- Darryl McDaniels
- Andy Macdonald
- Billy Merritt
- Daryl Mitchell
- Kel Mitchell
- Modern Humorist (Michael Colton and John Aboud)
- Billy Morrison
- Jason Mraz
- Gunnar Nelson
- Patrice O'Neal
- Mat Plendl
- Megyn Price
- Rachel Quaintance
- Efren Ramirez
- Mo Rocca
- Tom Root
- Darius Rucker
- Stuart Scott
- Brad Sherwood
- Hal Sparks
- Joel Stein
- French Stewart
- Michael Strahan
- Erik Per Sullivan
- Jeff Sutphen
- Misti Traya
- Alanna Ubach
- Frank Vincent
- Evan Wecksell
- Lauren Weedman
- Billy West
- Jill Whelan
- Wil Wheaton
- Chris Wylde
- Ying Yang Twins

== Recurring segments ==
- Evel Knievel's Amazing Toy Stunts: Evel Knievel action figure attempts jump over random objects and crashes into them.
- Scary Toys: Toys that scare people.
- Cobra Commander's Day Off: Hal Sparks, dressed as a life-size version of action figure villain Cobra Commander, spends his time playing mildly annoying practical jokes on others.
- Supermarket Surprise!: Small prizes found in corner store gum ball vending machines.
- Rank Update: Mo Rocca recaps the toys from each episode.
- Grow a...?: Toys that grow when you put them in water.
- Big in Japan: Voltron and Hello Kitty present toys popular in Japan, but less so in the United States.
- Spoofs of VH1 Shows: VH1 spoofs its own television shows, using toys.
- Real Etch a Sketch Masterpieces: Masterpieces that are drawn on an Etch a Sketch.
- Lego Extreme Challenge: An artist creates an "I Love Toys" logo, using Lego.
- During the credits of every episode, a clip from a popular music video was played without any type of commentary. These were usually replaced with a show promo by VH1.

== The Toys ==
=== Part 1: 100-81 ===
- 100: Magic 8 Ball
- 99: Thumbelina doll
- 98: BB guns
- 97: Spirograph
- 96: Pong
- 95: Chutes and Ladders
- 94: Laser Tag
- 93: Sea Monkeys
- 92: Dominoes
- 91: Uno
- 90: Models
- 89: Dungeons & Dragons
- 88: Care Bears
- 87: Radio Control Cars
- 86: Ouija Board
- 85: My Little Pony
- 84: Gumby
- 83: Memory
- 82: Little Golden Books
- 81: Wooly Willy

Evel Knievel's Amazing Toy Stunts: Evel Knievel jumps Barrel O' Monkeys

Scary Toys: Cymbal-banging monkey toy

Cobra Commander's Day Off: 9:17AM - Steal Morning Paper; 10:30AM - Defile Hal Sparks

Supermarket Surprise: Super Ball

Rank Update: Sea Monkeys, Uno, Models and Pong

Grow a...?: Caterpillar

Big in Japan: Astro Boy

Spoofs of VH1 Shows: Driven and Where Are They Now?

=== Part 2: 80-61 ===
- 80: Baby Alive
- 79: Trivial Pursuit
- 78: Green Army Men
- 77: Stickers
- 76: Balsa Wood Airplanes
- 75: Weebles
- 74: Erector Set
- 73: Rainbow Brite
- 72: Colorforms
- 71: Walkie-Talkies
- 70: Candy Land
- 69: Slip 'n Slide
- 68: Smurfs
- 67: Tinkertoys
- 66: Risk
- 65: Jigsaw Puzzles
- 64: Roller Skates
- 63: Rubik's Cube
- 62: Life
- 61: Operation

Evel Knievel's Amazing Toy Stunts: Evel Knievel jumps Imperial Walker

Scary Toys: Jack-in-the-box

Cobra Commander's Day Off: 11:15AM - Cheat at Chess; 11:47AM - Gas DMV

Supermarket Surprise: Ring

Rank Update: Green Army Men, Baby Alive and Balsa Wood Airplanes

Grow a...?: Alligator

Big in Japan: My Melody

Spoofs of VH1 Shows: Storytellers and Behind the Music

=== Part 3: 60-41 ===
- 60: Tickle Me Elmo
- 59: Simon
- 58: Mad Libs
- 57: Stretch Armstrong
- 56: Barrel O' Monkeys
- 55: Mouse Trap
- 54: View-Master
- 53: He-Man
- 52: Speak & Spell
- 51: Lincoln Logs
- 50: Game Boy
- 49: Clue
- 48: Little People
- 47: Evel Knievel Stunt Cycle
- 46: Hungry Hungry Hippos
- 45: Frisbee
- 44: Raggedy Ann and Andy
- 43: See 'n Say
- 42: Jump rope
- 41: Transformers

Evel Knievel's Amazing Toy Stunts: Evel Knievel jumps a globe

Scary Toys: Great Garloo

Cobra Commander's Day Off: 12:20PM - Rip Off Tourists; 12:27PM - Oppress Minority

Supermarket Surprise: Helmet

Rank Update: Mouse Trap, View-Master, Game Boy and He-Man

Grow a...?: Butterfly

Big in Japan: Godzilla

Spoofs of VH1 Shows: VH1 All Access: Awesomely Bad Fashion and The Surreal Life

=== Part 4: 40-21 ===
- 40: Big Wheel
- 39: Tea Set
- 38: Pogo Stick
- 37: Mattel Classic Football
- 36: Strawberry Shortcake
- 35: Tonka Trucks
- 34: Connect Four
- 33: Teenage Mutant Ninja Turtles
- 32: Shrinky Dinks
- 31: Twister
- 30: Battleship
- 29: Cabbage Patch Kids
- 28: Crayola Crayons
- 27: Silly Putty
- 26: Lionel Trains
- 25: Lite-Brite
- 24: Water guns
- 23: Nerf
- 22: Teddy bears
- 21: Nintendo

Evel Knievel's Amazing Toy Stunts: Evel Knievel jumps Sheriff Dillo

Scary Toys: Perfection

Cobra Commander's Day Off: 3:25PM - Ruin Workspace; 5:01PM - Terminate Connection

Supermarket Surprise: Homie

Rank Update: Pogo Stick, Tonka Trucks, Twister and Strawberry Shortcake

Grow a...?: Princess

Big in Japan: Afro Samurai

Spoofs of VH1 Shows: Before They Were Rock Stars and I Love the '80s

=== Part 5: 20-1 ===
- 20: Atari
- 19: Easy-Bake Oven
- 18: Scrabble
- 17: Rock 'Em Sock 'Em Robots
- 16: Etch A Sketch
- 15: Matchbox and Hot Wheels cars
- 14: Bicycles
- 13: Snoopy Sno-Cone Machine
- 12: Radio Flyer wagon
- 11: Play-Doh
- 10: Wiffle Bat and Ball
- 9: Slinky
- 8: Yo-yo
- 7: Star Wars Action Figures
- 6: Monopoly
- 5: Mr. Potato Head
- 4: G.I. Joe
- 3: Lego
- 2: Barbie
- 1: Hula hoop

Evel Knievel's Amazing Toy Stunts: Evel Knievel jumps spaghetti and meatballs

Scary Toys: Saucy Walker doll

Cobra Commander's Day Off: 1:15PM - Piss Off Chrome Dome; Sabotage Men's Room

Supermarket Surprise: Paratrooper

Rank Update: Atari, Bicycles, Snoopy Sno-Cone Machine, Play-Doh and Easy-Bake Oven

Grow a...?: Lizard

Big in Japan: Business Man

Spoofs of VH1 Shows: The Fabulous Life of... and Celebrity Fit Club

Real Etch-a-Sketch Masterpieces: Andy Warhol, Albert Einstein and Jay Leno

LEGO Extreme Challenge: 1,768 Bricks, 8 Colors and 7 Hours

Preceded by I Love the Holidays	I Love Toys	Next: I Love the '70s: Volume 2
