= I Love the '70s (American TV series) =

2003 American TV series

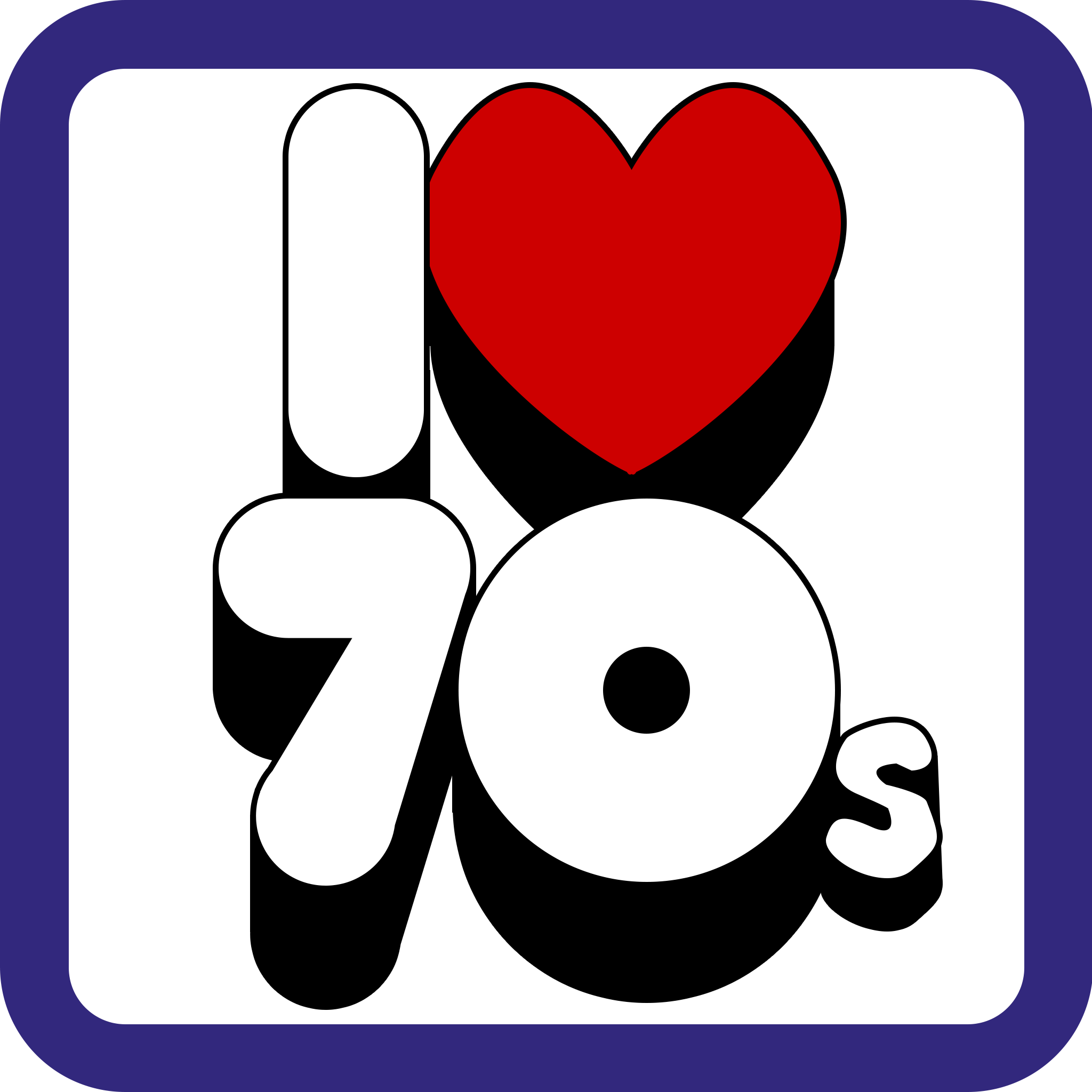
- Icon used in the titles of the series.
- Genre: Documentary
- Narrated by: Doug Jeffers
- Composer: Rob Cairns
- Country of origin: United States
- Original language: English
- No. of seasons: 1
- No. of episodes: 10

Production
- Producers: Greg Altman; Michael Dutton; Karla Hidalgo; Sean Johnson; Sandra Kuhn
- Running time: 41 min.

Original release
- Network: VH1
- Release: August 18 – August 22, 2003

Related
- I Love the '70s (British version); I Love the '80s (British version); I Love the '90s (British version); I Love the '80s (American version); I Love the '80s Strikes Back; I Love the '90s (American version); I Love the '90s: Part Deux; I Love the '80s 3-D; I Love the Holidays; I Love Toys; I Love the '70s: Volume 2 I Love the New Millennium; Best of I Love the... I Love the 2000s

I Love the '70s is a 1970s nostalgia television miniseries and the second installment of the I Love... series produced by VH1. The series is based on a BBC series of the same name. It examines the pop culture of the 1970s, using footage from the era, along with "Where Are They Now?" interviews with celebrities from the decade. Additionally, the show features comedians poking fun at the kitschiness of what was popular. The first episode of the series, I Love 1970, premiered on August 18, and concluded with the final episode of the series, I Love 1979, on August 22, 2003. A sequel, I Love the '70s: Volume 2, appeared in the United States on VH1 beginning on July 10, 2006.

== Commentators ==
- Aerosmith (Joe Perry and Tom Hamilton)
- Art Alexakis
- Flex Alexander
- John Amos
- Loni Anderson
- Tom Arnold
- Sebastian Bach
- Bob Balaban
- Alec Baldwin
- Jillian Barberie
- Bob Barker
- Bella the Chimp
- Fred "Rerun" Berry
- Lewis Black
- Michael Ian Black
- Linda Blair
- Todd Bridges
- Andrew Bryniarski
- Robin Byrd
- Nancy Carell
- Lynda Carter
- David Cassidy
- Charlie's Angels (Lucy Liu, Drew Barrymore and Cameron Diaz)
- Ellen Cleghorne
- Eric Close
- Didi Conn
- Jeff Corwin
- Molly Culver
- Bo Derek
- Simon Doonan
- Bill Dwyer
- Rich Eisen
- Joe Elliott
- Erik Estrada
- Dannah Feinglass
- Miguel Ferrer
- Lou Ferrigno
- Greg Fitzsimmons
- Dave Foley
- Jorja Fox
- Kim France
- Doug E. Fresh
- Jim Gaffigan
- Gina Garan
- Leif Garrett
- Kyle Gass
- Peri Gilpin
- Annabelle Gurwitch
- Luis Guzman
- Sammy Hagar
- Gunnar Hansen
- Rachael Harris
- Tony Hawk
- Isaac Hayes
- Hugh Hefner
- Leslie Hope
- Mark Hoppus
- Scott Ian
- Rick James
- Ron Jeremy
- Randy Jones
- Kermit the Frog
- Brian Krause
- Nick Lachey
- Lisa Lampanelli
- David L. Lander
- Carol Leifer
- Donal Logue
- George Lopez
- Loni Love
- Stephen Lynch
- Justina Machado
- Michael Madsen
- Marilyn Manson
- Constance Marie
- Cheech Marin
- Ziggy Marley
- Benito Martinez
- Matchbox Twenty (Paul Doucette and Rob Thomas)
- Edwin McCain
- Darryl McDaniels
- Kevin McDonald
- McG
- Mark McKinney
- Bret Michaels
- Leon Mobley
- Colin Mochrie
- Pat Monahan
- Demi Moore
- Jason Mraz
- Garcelle Beauvais-Nilon
- Sharon Osbourne
- Ron Palillo
- Penn & Teller
- Liz Phair
- Lisa Marie Presley
- Megyn Price
- Greg Proops
- Rachel Quaintance
- Lionel Richie
- Mo Rocca
- Nile Rodgers
- The Roots (Black Thought and ?uestlove)
- Tracee Ellis Ross
- David Lee Roth
- Kelly Rowland
- Jill Scott
- Stuart Scott
- Robert Shields
- Pauly Shore
- Mitch Silpa
- Grace Slick
- Kurtwood Smith
- Dee Snider
- Kevin Sorbo
- Hal Sparks
- Joel Stein
- Fisher Stevens
- Stiller and Meara
- Jeff Stilson
- Treach
- Uncle Kracker
- Brian Unger
- Vinnie
- David Wain
- Steven Weber
- Kevin Weisman
- Maggie Wheeler
- Victor Williams
- Nancy and Ann Wilson
- Dean Winters
- Stacey Grenrock-Woods
- Bernadette Yao
- Rob Zombie

== Recurring segments ==
- Roller Rink Anthem: Leif Garrett presents one of the big hits of the year in question.
- Foxy Ladies: Erik Estrada presents the hottest women of the year.
- Macho Men: Bo Derek presents the hottest men of the year.
- Commercial: A famous television ad is shown from the 1970s.
- Wonders: Lynda Carter presents various products and inventions that were introduced in the given year.
- Follicle Fads: Isaac Hayes presents what the hottest hairstyle was for the year, sometimes choosing more than one.
- Bella Says: Bella the Chimp picks a primate of the year (with subtitles).
- During the credits of every episode, a popular song from each year was played while footage of Bella the Chimp playing with 1970s toys was shown. These were usually replaced with a show promo by Vh1.
- On every episode, Kermit the Frog does a parody of the "brought to you by" segments of Sesame Street by saying "I Love the '70s is brought to you by the letter V, the letter H, and the number 1."

== Topics covered by year ==
=== 1970 ===
- The Jackson 5
- Weebles
- Sesame Street
- The Partridge Family
- Hee Haw
- The Carol Burnett Show
- Love, American Style
- Wife swapping
- Waterbed
- The Newlywed Game
- The Mod Squad
- The Odd Couple
- Elvis meets Nixon
- Black Sabbath
- Easy Listening Music (specifically The Carpenters and Bread)
- Monday Night Football
- Love Story
- Neil Diamond
- The Beatles' breakup
- Mutual of Omaha's Wild Kingdom
- Lite-Brite
- Mister Rogers' Neighborhood
- Are You There God? It's Me, Margaret. by Judy Blume
- The Brady Bunch

Roller Rink Anthem of 1970: "American Woman" by The Guess Who

Foxy Ladies of 1970: Goldie Hawn, Elizabeth Montgomery and Jane Fonda

Macho Men of 1970: Jack Lord, Frank Gifford and James Brolin

Flashback Commercial of 1970: 9Lives

Wonders of 1970: The first floppy disk, the pocket calculator and the computer mouse

Follicle Fad of 1970: Butt-length hair

Primate of 1970: Lancelot Link

=== 1971 ===
- Shaft
- The Electric Company
- Tom Jones
- Keep America Beautiful
- Hogan's Heroes
- Fiddler On The Roof
- "Stairway to Heaven" by Led Zeppelin
- Ouija
- Soul Train
- All in the Family
- Kareem Abdul-Jabbar
- Hot pants
- Operation
- "Joy To The World" by Three Dog Night
- H.R. Pufnstuf
- Dirty Harry
- Ford Pinto
- Bell-bottoms
- Coca-Cola's "I'd Like to Teach the World to Sing" commercials
- Willy Wonka & the Chocolate Factory

Roller Rink Anthem of 1971: "American Pie" by Don McLean

Foxy Ladies of 1971: Tina Turner, Candice Bergen and Jill St. John

Macho Men of 1971: Sean Connery, Rod Stewart and James Brown

Flashback Commercial of 1971: Charmin

Wonders of 1971: Hamburger Helper, Egg McMuffin (actually introduced in 1972) and Starbucks coffee

Follicle Fad of 1971: He-Man or Jesus hair

Primate of 1971: Raffles

=== 1972 ===
- Kung Fu and Bruce Lee
- Scooby-Doo, Where Are You!
- Stevie Wonder
- The Godfather
- Fat Albert and the Cosby Kids
- Afro
- Ben
- Lunch boxes and Wonder Bread
- Deep Throat
- The Poseidon Adventure
- Sea Monkeys
- Mark Spitz
- Gaucho pants
- The Bermuda Triangle
- Josie and the Pussycats and Josie and the Pussycats in Outer Space
- Ziggy Stardust
- "I Am Woman" by Helen Reddy and the Women's Liberation Movement
- Blythe
- John Lennon and Yoko Ono on The Mike Douglas Show
- Deliverance
- The Brady kids grow up and three-part Hawaii arc in The Brady Bunch's fourth season

Roller Rink Anthem of 1972: "Superfly" by Curtis Mayfield

Foxy Ladies of 1972: Barbi Benton, Nadia Comăneci and Gloria Steinem

Macho Men of 1972: Bob Griese, Steve McQueen and Bobby Fischer

Flashback Commercial of 1972: Chiffon Margarine (actually aired in 1979)

Wonders of 1972: Hacky-sack, frozen yogurt, White Zinfandel and Atkins diet

Follicle Fad of 1972: Women having unshaved armpits, legs and pubic regions

Primate of 1972: Caesar

=== 1973 ===
- Sanford and Son
- A Charlie Brown Thanksgiving
- "Jungle Boogie" by Kool & the Gang
- Baby Alive
- The Waltons
- Live and Let Die
- Leisure suit
- Charlotte's Web
- Pink Floyd's The Dark Side of the Moon album
- Shrinky Dinks
- The Dating Game
- The Joy of Sex by Alex Comfort (originally published in 1972)
- "Free Bird" by Lynyrd Skynyrd
- The Sonny & Cher Comedy Hour
- Billie Jean King vs. Bobby Riggs ("Battle of the Sexes II")
- Kojak
- Schoolhouse Rock
- Rollerderby and Kansas City Bomber
- Easy-Bake Oven
- ZOOM
- The Exorcist

Roller Rink Anthem of 1973: "Goodbye Yellow Brick Road" by Elton John

Foxy Ladies of 1973: Carly Simon, Gladys Knight and Carole & Paula

Macho Men of 1973: Paul Newman & Robert Redford, James Taylor and Roger Moore

Flashback Commercial of 1973: Fisher-Price Medical Kit

Wonders of 1973: Designated hitter, Krazy Glue, Cuisinart and disposable lighters

Follicle Fad of 1973: Baldness

Primate of 1973: Aldo

=== 1974 ===
- Benji
- Little House on the Prairie
- Hong Kong Phooey
- "Sweet Home Alabama" by Lynyrd Skynyrd
- Good Times
- Connect Four
- Let's Make a Deal
- Elton John
- Day of the week panties
- Streaking
- Blazing Saddles and Young Frankenstein
- Magic 8 Ball
- Patty Hearst
- The Towering Inferno
- Foxy Brown
- The Texas Chain Saw Massacre
- Rumble in the Jungle
- Slip 'N Slide
- "The Joker" by The Steve Miller Band
- Death Wish
- Happy Days

Roller Rink Anthem of 1974: "The Way We Were" by Barbra Streisand

Foxy Ladies of 1974: Britt Ekland, Bebe Buell and Angie Dickinson

Macho Men of 1974: Eric Clapton, Mikhail Baryshnikov and Freddie Prinze

Flashback Commercial of 1974: Meow Mix

Wonders of 1974: Lite beer, People magazine, VCR and liposuction

Follicle Fad of 1974: Mutton chops

Primate of 1974: Magilla Gorilla

=== 1975 ===
- Welcome Back, Kotter
- Big Wheel
- Earth, Wind & Fire
- One Day at a Time
- Pet Rock
- 8 Track
- Land of the Lost
- The Life and Times of Grizzly Adams
- Pelé
- Pong
- The Shazam!/Isis Hour
- "Love Will Keep Us Together" by Captain & Tennille
- Baretta
- "Feelings" by Morris Albert
- The Secret Life of Plants by Peter Tompkins and Christopher Bird (originally published in 1973)
- Saturday Night Live
- Erhard Seminars Training
- Squeaky Fromme and Sara Jane Moore try assassinating Gerald Ford
- Barry Manilow
- Metrication in the United States
- Liberace
- "Rhinestone Cowboy" by Glen Campbell
- Mood ring
- Tony Orlando and Dawn
- Monty Python (specifically Monty Python's Flying Circus and Monty Python and the Holy Grail)
- Jaws

Roller Rink Anthem of 1975: "That's The Way I Like It" by KC and the Sunshine Band

Foxy Ladies of 1975: Suzi Quatro, Chris Evert and Charo

Macho Men of 1975: Bruce Springsteen, Carlton Fisk and Joe Namath

Flashback Commercial of 1975: Band-Aid

Wonders of 1975: Kool-Aid, Freshen Up Gum, Famous Amos Cookies and NordicTrack

Follicle Fad of 1975: Grizzly Adams style

Primate of 1975: Cymbal monkey

=== 1976 ===
- Charlie's Angels
- Kiss
- The Muppet Show
- Carrie
- The Gong Show
- Family Feud
- Donny and Marie
- Oscar Mayer
- Taxi Driver
- Starsky and Hutch
- Dr. J
- Bigfoot and Loch Ness Monster
- "Do You Feel Like We Do" by Peter Frampton
- Car Wash
- Rocky
- Stretch Armstrong
- Captain Kangaroo
- The Bad News Bears
- United States Bicentennial

Roller Rink Anthem of 1976: "December, 1963 (Oh, What a Night)" by The Four Seasons

Foxy Ladies of 1976: Heart's Nancy & Ann Wilson, Jessica Lange and Lauren Hutton

Macho Men of 1976: Peter Frampton, Bob Marley and Jimmy Connors

Flashback Commercial of 1976: Wisk

Wonders of 1976: Perrier, I Love New York and United States Bicentennial

Follicle Fad of 1976: Dorothy Hamill style and shag

Primate of 1976: King Kong

=== 1977 ===
- Wonder Woman
- Battle of the Network Stars
- ABBA
- Close Encounters of the Third Kind
- Star Wars
- What's Happening!!
- "You Light Up My Life" by Debby Boone
- Shields and Yarnell
- Saturday Night Fever
- Studio 54
- Queen
- New York City (Son of Sam, New York City Blackout of 1977, and 1977 World Series)
- Smokey and the Bandit
- Annie Hall
- Clackers
- Punk rock (specifically the Ramones, the Sex Pistols, The Clash, and the New York Dolls)
- Roots

Roller Rink Anthem of 1977: "Don't Leave Me This Way" by Thelma Houston

Foxy Ladies of 1977: Cheryl Ladd, Stevie Nicks and Jacqueline Bisset

Macho Men of 1977: Lindsey Buckingham, Richard Gere and Arnold Schwarzenegger

Flashback Commercial of 1977: Miller Lite - "Great taste, less filling" (featuring Mickey Spillane, Rodney Dangerfield, Nick Buoniconti, Dick Butkus, Bubba Smith, Deacon Jones and Billy Martin)

Wonders of 1977: Billy Beer, the first MRI and sports bra

Follicle Fad of 1977: Chest hair and Mohawk

Primate of 1977: The Grape Ape

=== 1978 ===
- Superman
- The Incredible Hulk
- Super Friends
- Halloween
- The Price Is Right
- "Brick House" by Commodores
- Underalls
- Debbie Does Dallas
- Louise Brown
- Bee Gees
- Grease
- WKRP in Cincinnati
- "Da Ya Think I'm Sexy?" by Rod Stewart
- B.J. and the Bear
- CB radios
- Up In Smoke
- Fantasy Island
- The Who and Led Zeppelin
- Simon
- The Wiz
- National Lampoon's Animal House

Roller Rink Anthem of 1978: "Le Freak" by Chic

Foxy Ladies of 1978: Margot Kidder, Raquel Welch and Cheryl Tiegs

Macho Men of 1978: Andy Gibb, Björn Borg and Mick Jagger

Flashback Commercial of 1978: Body on Tap shampoo

Wonders of 1978: Ben & Jerry's, Reese's Pieces, Ginsu and Ironman Triathlon

Follicle Fad of 1978: Throwback hair

Primate of 1978: Evie

=== 1979 ===
- CHiPs
- The Warriors
- Pop Rocks
- "I Will Survive" by Gloria Gaynor
- Apocalypse Now
- Alien
- Slime
- Taxi
- Pittsburgh's back-to-back win in Super Bowl XIII and 1979 World Series
- 10
- Donna Summer
- Candie's shoes
- Dallas Cowboys Cheerleaders
- Chippendale dancers
- Three's Company
- The Jerk
- Jimmy Carter's Swamp Rabbit incident
- "My Sharona" by The Knack
- Captain Caveman and the Teen Angels
- Village People
- The Muppet Movie

Roller Rink Anthem of 1979: "We Are Family" by Sister Sledge

Foxy Ladies of 1979: Erin Gray, Bette Midler and Sally Field

Macho Men of 1979: Ted Nugent, Sting and Dudley Moore

Flashback Commercial of 1979: Coca-Cola (featuring Mean Joe)

Wonders of 1979: ESPN, tanning beds and Sunkist

Follicle Fad of 1979: Mustache

Primate of 1979: Monkey

Preceded by I Love the '80s (American version)	I Love the '70s (American version)	Next: I Love the '80s Strikes Back
