= I Love the New Millennium =

2008 American TV series

- Genre: Documentary
- Narrated by: Doug Jeffers
- Country of origin: United States
- Original language: English
- No. of seasons: 1
- No. of episodes: 8

Production
- Running time: 42 min.

Original release
- Network: VH1
- Release: June 23 – June 26, 2008

Related
- I Love the '80s I Love the '70s I Love the '80s Strikes Back; I Love the '90s I Love the '90s: Part Deux; I Love the '80s 3-D; I Love the Holidays; I Love Toys; I Love the '70s: Volume 2 Best of I Love the... I Love the 2000s

I Love the New Millennium is a mini-series and the tenth installment of the I Love the... series focusing on the 2000s and premiered on VH1 Monday, June 23, 2008. Each night, from Monday to Thursday, two of the eight episodes premiered, corresponding to the years from 2000 to 2007. As the series aired in 2008, it did not include episodes for the years 2008 or 2009. A second series about 2000s nostalgia called I Love the 2000s was made in 2014, including episodes for the years 2008 and 2009.

The show was hosted by Regan Burns, Rachel Quaintance, and Keith Powell. Executive producers were Karla Hilalgo and Meredith Ross.

== Reception ==
Newsday television critic Andy Edelstein praised the television series, writing, "Of course, the pace of nostalgia is on hyperspeed, but maybe VH1 is on to something." He recommended viewers watch the program if they are "nostalgic about the events and pop culture of the very recent past". Curt Wager of the Chicago Tribune wrote, "The years 2000 and 2001, of course, kick off the eight-part series filled with tons of 'I can't believe he said that' moments that should keep you laughing—as long as you can handle off-color commentary and a lot of bleeping. I was spitting up my coffee."

Preceded by I Love the '70s: Volume 2	I Love the New Millennium	Next: Best of I Love the...
