= I Love the '90s (American TV series) =

2004 American TV series

- Genre: Documentary
- Narrated by: Doug Jeffers
- Country of origin: United States
- Original language: English
- No. of seasons: 1
- No. of episodes: 10

Production
- Running time: 42 min.

Original release
- Network: VH1
- Release: July 12 – July 16, 2004

Related
- I Love the '70s (British version); I Love the '80s (British version); I Love the '90s (British version); I Love the '80s (American version); I Love the '70s (American version); I Love the '80s Strikes Back; I Love the '90s: Part Deux; I Love the '80s 3-D; I Love the Holidays; I Love Toys; I Love the '70s: Volume 2 I Love the New Millennium; Best of I Love the... I Love the 2000s

I Love the '90s is an American television mini-series and the fourth installment of the I Love the... series produced by VH1 in which various music and TV personalities talk about the 1990s culture and all it had to offer. The show premiered July 12, 2004, with the episode "I Love 1990" and aired two episodes daily until July 16, 2004, when it ended with "I Love 1999". On January 17, 2005, a sequel (named I Love the '90s: Part Deux) was aired in the same fashion.

== Recurring segments ==
- Uncut and Uncensored: Each commentator gives their additional opinion on a topic that was covered in its respective year.
- Dance Songs: MC Hammer looks back on some of the year's best dance songs.
- Dirty Alternative Rockers: Liz Phair lists the male alternative rock artists for each year.
- Wendy the Snapple Lady Answers Viewer Mail: Wendy Kaufman receives mail from viewers in each year.
- Hotties: Michael Bolton presents the top female entertainment personalities of the year.
- Rename Your Favorite TV Show: Jay and Silent Bob rename each year's favorite TV show.
- Final Thought: Jerry Springer gives his final thoughts on each year at the end of the episode.
- During the credits of every episode, a clip from a popular music video was played without any type of commentary. These were usually replaced with a show promo by VH1.

== Topics covered by year ==
=== 1990 ===
- Pretty Woman
- Twin Peaks
- "Nothing Compares 2 U" by Sinéad O'Connor
- Marion Barry is caught smoking crack
- Ghost
- Jack Kevorkian's controversial suicide technique
- "The Humpty Dance" by Digital Underground
- MC Hammer and Vanilla Ice
- The Forbidden Dance and Lambada
- "How Am I Supposed to Live Without You" by Michael Bolton (originally released in 1989)
- "I've fallen and I can't get up!"
- "Groove Is in the Heart" by Deee-Lite
- Guess jeans
- Dances with Wolves
- In Living Color
- "Hold On" by Wilson Phillips
- Edward Scissorhands
- Slap bracelets
- Goodfellas

Uncut and Uncensored: Michael Ian Black on Marion Barry

Dance Songs of 1990: "Pump Up the Jam" by Technotronic, "Everybody, Everybody" by Black Box and "Vogue" by Madonna

Dirty Alternative Rockers of 1990: Black Francis, Jane's Addiction and Mike Patton

Hotties of 1990: Christina Applegate, Robin Givens and Nicole Kidman

Rename Your Favorite TV Show of 1990: In Living Color (Watch Jim Carrey Keep It Real for Whitey and Burn Victims)

Final Thought on 1990: "Ice Ice Baby", Lambada and In Living Color

=== 1991 ===
- Beverly Hills, 90210
- Boyz n the Hood
- The Clarence Thomas/Anita Hill sexual harassment hearings
- Grunge
- New Jack City
- Color Me Badd
- Bugle Boy jeans
- "Rico Suave" by Gerardo
- Thelma & Louise
- Family Matters
- Pee-Wee Herman caught masturbating
- Super Bowl XXV and Wide Right
- "Enter Sandman" by Metallica
- Point Break
- “Gonna Make You Sweat (Everybody Dance Now)” by C+C Music Factory
- Rollerblades
- Garth Brooks
- The Silence of the Lambs

Uncut and Uncensored: Michael Ian Black on Clarence Thomas

Dance Songs of 1991: "Gypsy Woman (She's Homeless)" by Crystal Waters, "Tom's Diner" by Suzanne Vega and DNA and "Unbelievable" by EMF

Dirty Alternative Rockers of 1991: Eddie Vedder, Krist Novoselic and Kim Thayil

Hotties of 1991: Pamela Anderson, Naomi Campbell and Chynna Phillips

Rename Your Favorite TV Show of 1991: Family Matters (Black Nerd Says the Darndest Thing to That Twinkie-Eating Cop from Die Hard)

Final Thought on 1991: Boyz n the Hood, Beverly Hills, 90210, Pee-Wee Herman, Clarence Thomas and Naughty by Nature

=== 1992 ===
- Wayne's World
- The Amy Fisher and Joey Buttafuoco affair
- "Achy Breaky Heart" by Billy Ray Cyrus
- Ross Perot
- "I'm Too Sexy" by Right Said Fred
- Fabio
- The Real World
- Woody Allen's affair with his stepdaughter
- Kris Kross
- Sex by Madonna
- "Baby Got Back" by Sir Mix-a-Lot
- The Dream Team
- The Ren & Stimpy Show
- Murphy Brown
- Single White Female
- Arrested Development
- Reservoir Dogs
- Mortal Kombat
- Barney & Friends
- Dan & Dave
- The Bodyguard

Uncut and Uncensored: Billy West on Ren and Stimpy

Dance Songs of 1992: "Move This" by Technotronic, "Humpin' Around" by Bobby Brown and "Finally" by CeCe Peniston

Dirty Alternative Rockers of 1992: Thurston Moore, Lenny Kravitz and Red Hot Chili Peppers

Hotties of 1992: Michelle Pfeiffer, Rebecca De Mornay and Annabella Sciorra

Rename Your Favorite TV Show of 1992: Murphy Brown (Stupid Show You Couldn't Pay Us to Watch About Some Old Lady)

Final Thought on 1992: "Baby Got Back", Ross Perot and Joey Buttafuco

=== 1993 ===
- Jurassic Park
- Marge Schott
- "Informer" by Snow
- Where's Waldo? (originally published in 1987)
- Martin
- Free Willy
- John and Lorena Bobbitt
- "No Rain" by Blind Melon
- The Fugitive
- The Waco Siege
- Dr. Quinn, Medicine Woman
- Dr. Dre and Snoop Dogg
- Mighty Morphin Power Rangers
- Dazed and Confused
- Beavis and Butt-Head (Unaired)
- Crystal Pepsi
- Quantum Leap
- Aerosmith's music video trilogy with Alicia Silverstone
- The X-Files

Uncut and Uncensored: Godfrey on Dr. Quinn, Medicine Woman

Dance Songs of 1993: "Whoomp! (There It Is)" by Tag Team, "What Is Love" by Haddaway and "Rhythm is a Dancer" by Snap!

Dirty Alternative Rockers of 1993: Henry Rollins, Evan Dando and J Mascis

Hotties of 1993: Teri Hatcher, Meg Ryan and Demi Moore

Rename Your Favorite TV Show of 1993: The X-Files (Dork Porn Where Some Redhead is Hot and the Aliens Are Really Lame)

Final Thought on 1993: Free Willy, John and Lorena Bobbitt, and Bill Clinton

=== 1994 ===
- Melrose Place
- The Nancy Kerrigan/Tonya Harding drama
- Reality Bites (featuring "Stay (I Missed You)" by Lisa Loeb and Nine Stories)
- John Tesh becomes a musician
- Speed
- The O.J. Simpson Bronco chase
- NYPD Blue
- "Mmm Mmm Mmm Mmm" by Crash Test Dummies
- George Foreman's comeback
- Boyz II Men
- Tommy Hilfiger makes hip hop clothing
- Pulp Fiction
- Ace of Base
- Woodstock '94
- Salt-n-Pepa
- Forrest Gump

Uncut and Uncensored: Modern Humorist on "Stay"

Dance Songs of 1994: "100% Pure Love" by Crystal Waters, "Tootsee Roll" by 69 Boyz and "Cantaloop (Flip Fantasia)" by Us3

Dirty Alternative Rockers of 1994: Beck, Chris Cornell and Trent Reznor

Hotties of 1994: Jennifer Love Hewitt, Cameron Diaz and Tiffani-Amber Thiessen

Rename Your Favorite TV Show of 1994: Melrose Place (90210 But with a Pool)

Final Thought on 1994: Tonya Harding vs. Nancy Kerrigan, George Foreman Grill and Forrest Gump

=== 1995 ===
- Toy Story
- Party of Five
- "Gangsta's Paradise" by Coolio and L.V.
- Snapple
- Waterworld
- Hugh Grant caught with prostitute Divine Brown
- M&M's spokescandies commercials
- Heroin chic
- TLC
- Clueless
- "Cotton Eye Joe" by Rednex
- Xena: Warrior Princess and Hercules: The Legendary Journeys
- Tattoos and piercings
- Babe
- PlayStation
- Chat rooms and cybersex
- X Games and MTV Sports
- Hootie & the Blowfish
- Braveheart

Uncut and Uncensored: Craig Ferguson on Babe

Dance Songs of 1995: "Everlasting Love" by Gloria Estefan, "Total Eclipse of the Heart" by Nicki French and "This Is How We Do It" by Montell Jordan

Dirty Alternative Rockers of 1995: Gavin Rossdale, Scott Weiland and Billie Joe Armstrong

Hotties of 1995: Shirley Manson, Holly Robinson and Gabrielle Reece

Rename Your Favorite TV Show of 1995: Party of Five (5 Whiny Bitches That Complain About How Their Parents Got Killed in an Accident)

Final Thought on 1995: Hootie and the Blowfish, chat rooms, heroin chic, the Rachel haircut, X Games, and tattoos and piercings

=== 1996 ===
- The Macarena (originally released in 1993)
- Oakland Ebonics controversy
- Twister
- The Nanny
- Tickle Me Elmo
- Oasis
- Independence Day
- Bob Dole
- Zubaz
- Tiger Woods and Dennis Rodman
- Mentos commercials
- "C'mon N' Ride It (The Train)" by Quad City DJs
- Alanis Morissette's Jagged Little Pill album (originally released in 1995)
- Kathie Lee Gifford's child labor scandal
- Sling Blade
- "One of Us" by Joan Osborne
- Jerry Maguire

Uncut and Uncensored: Hal Sparks on Karl and Forrest

Dance Songs of 1996: "Missing" (Todd Terry Remix) by Everything but the Girl, "No Diggity" by Blackstreet featuring Dr. Dre and "Be My Lover" by La Bouche

Dirty Alternative Rockers of 1996: Zack de la Rocha, John Rzeznik and Billy Corgan

Hotties of 1996: Brooke Shields, Gwyneth Paltrow and Gwen Stefani

Rename Your Favorite TV Show of 1996: The Nanny (The "Old Navy" Hot Chick with the Annoying Voice)

Final Thought on 1996: Jerry Maguire, "One of Us" and the Macarena

=== 1997 ===
- Austin Powers: International Man of Mystery
- Spice Girls
- McCaughey septuplets
- "Tubthumping" by Chumbawamba
- The Full Monty
- Hanson
- Dolly the Sheep
- Beanie Babies
- Boogie Nights
- Fiona Apple
- Tamagotchi
- Jewel
- Ally McBeal
- "Barbie Girl" by Aqua
- Lilith Fair
- Holyfield-Tyson II
- The Heaven's Gate cult suicide
- South Park

Uncut and Uncensored: Craig Ferguson on Beanie Babies

Dance Songs of 1997: "Hippychick" by Soho, "The Rhythm of the Night" by Corona and "Beautiful Life" by Ace of Base

Dirty Alternative Rockers of 1997: Thom Yorke, Damon Albarn and Fatboy Slim

Hotties of 1997: Nicollette Sheridan, Toni Braxton and Ashley Judd

Rename Your Favorite TV Show of 1997: South Park (Why Didn't We Come Up with this Show and Make Millions of Dollars)

Final Thought on 1997: Spice Girls, Ally McBeal, Holyfield-Tyson II and "How Bizarre"

=== 1998 ===
- Clinton–Lewinsky scandal
- Viagra
- John Glenn's return to space
- Armageddon
- "Gettin' Jiggy Wit It" by Will Smith
- Teletubbies
- Backstreet Boys
- Dawson's Creek
- "Torn" by Natalie Imbruglia
- Jerry Springer
- Jesse Ventura becomes governor of Minnesota
- "The Dope Show" by Marilyn Manson
- Furby
- The Big Lebowski
- Swing revival
- Mark McGwire vs. Sammy Sosa
- Frasier
- Martha Stewart
- Soccer moms
- "Make 'Em Say Uhh!" by Master P, Fiend, Silkk the Shocker, Mia X and Mystikal
- There's Something About Mary

Uncut and Uncensored: Rachael Harris on Monica Lewinsky

Dance Songs of 1998: "If You Could Read My Mind" by Stars on 54, "Nobody's Supposed to Be Here" (Dance Mix) by Deborah Cox and "Ray of Light" by Madonna

Dirty Alternative Rockers of 1998: Everlast, Fred Durst and Jonathan Davis

Hotties of 1998: Carmen Electra, Faith Hill, and Lauryn Hill

Rename Your Favorite TV Show of 1998: Dawson's Creek (90210 on a Creek)

Final Thought on 1998: Swing revival, Clinton–Lewinsky scandal, The Jerry Springer Show, There's Something About Mary, "Gettin' Jiggy Wit It" and Teletubbies

=== 1999 ===
- The Blair Witch Project
- Tae Bo
- Who Wants To Be A Millionaire
- "Summer Girls" by LFO
- Y2K
- Fight Club
- The Taco Bell chihuahua
- John Rocker
- The Sixth Sense
- Harry Potter
- Latin pop explosion (specifically Ricky Martin, Enrique Iglesias, and Marc Anthony)
- The Elián González drowning situation
- "Mambo No. 5 (A Little Bit Of...)" by Lou Bega
- Office Space
- Susan Lucci breaks the Daytime Emmy curse after nineteen consecutive nominations.
- Teen pop explosion (specifically Britney Spears, Christina Aguilera, Mandy Moore, and Jessica Simpson)
- Atkins diet
- The Matrix

Uncut and Uncensored: Jane's Addiction on the '90s

Dance Songs of 1999: "Waiting for Tonight" by Jennifer Lopez, "Believe" by Cher and "Music Sounds Better with You" by Stardust

Dirty Alternative Rockers of 1999: Mark Hoppus, Brandon Boyd and Kid Rock

Hotties of 1999: Anna Kournikova, Shania Twain and Shannon Elizabeth

Rename Your Favorite TV Show of 1999: Who Wants to Be a Millionaire (Who Doesn't Want to Be a Millionaire)

Final Thought on 1999: Y2K, Susan Lucci, "Mambo No. 5 (A Little Bit Of...)" and Napster

Preceded by I Love the '80s Strikes Back	I Love the '90s (American version)	Next: I Love the '90s: Part Deux
