= I Love the '80s Strikes Back =

2003 American TV series

- Genre: Documentary
- Written by: Mike Goudreau
- Narrated by: Doug Jeffers
- Country of origin: United States
- Original language: English
- No. of episodes: 10

Production
- Running time: 60 minutes

Original release
- Network: VH1
- Release: October 20 – October 24, 2003

Related
- I Love the '80s (American TV series); I Love the '70s (American TV series); I Love the '90s (American TV series); I Love the '90s: Part Deux; I Love the '80s 3-D; I Love the Holidays; I Love Toys; I Love the '70s: Volume 2 I Love the New Millennium; Best of I Love the... I Love the 2000s

I Love the '80s Strikes Back is a 1980s nostalgia miniseries and the third installment of the I Love the... series on VH1 in which various music and television personalities reminisce about 1980s popular culture in a mostly humorous manner. The series premiered on October 20, 2003, and is a sequel to I Love the '80s.

The sequel designation is in the reference to The Empire Strikes Back.

== Commentators ==
- Carol Alt
- John Amos*
- Cedric the Entertainer
- Curtis Armstrong
- Rosanna Arquette
- apl.de.ap & will.i.am
- Ashanti
- Sebastian Bach
- Barenaked Ladies (Ed Robertson, Tyler Stewart and Steven Page)
- Anna Belknap*
- Greg Behrendt
- D.C. Benny
- Frank Black
- Michael Ian Black
- Lesley Boone
- Bozo the Clown
- Brooke Burke
- Bill Burr
- Timothy Busfield
- Bryan Callen
- Candace Cameron
- Mariah Carey
- Ellen Cleghorne
- George Clinton
- Stewart Copeland
- David Coverdale
- Jon Cryer
- Molly Culver
- Dido
- Rocco DiSpirito*
- The Donnas (Brett Anderson & Torry Castellano and Maya Ford & Allison Robertson)
- Simon Doonan
- Howie Dorough
- Bil Dwyer
- Sheila E.
- Rich Eisen
- Perry Farrell & Chris Chaney
- Corey Feldman
- Colin Ferguson
- Craig Ferguson
- Mark Feuerstein & Ashley Williams
- Flavor Flav
- Lita Ford
- Samantha Fox
- Doug E. Fresh
- John Fugelsang
- Zach Galligan
- Boy George
- Deborah Gibson
- Godfrey
- Tracey Gold
- Gilbert Gottfried
- Kathy Griffin*
- Luis Guzman
- Hall & Oates
- Hanson
- Rachael Harris
- Steve Harwell
- Colin Hay
- Jason Hervey
- Susanna Hoffs & Vicki Peterson
- Leslie Hope
- Finola Hughes
- Scott Ian
- Stephan Jenkins
- Chris Jericho
- Cherie Johnson
- Cris Judd
- Nick Lachey
- Queen Latifah*
- Cyndi Lauper
- Juliette Lewis
- Adam Levine & James Valentine
- Beth Littleford
- Donal Logue
- Loni Love
- Rob Lowe*
- Carl Lumbly
- Stephen Lynch
- Virginia Madsen
- Joe Mantegna
- John Mayer
- MC Lyte
- Tim McGraw
- Darryl McDaniels
- Mark McGrath
- Breckin Meyer*
- Penelope Ann Miller
- Monica
- Mandy Moore
- Tom Morello
- Vince Neil
- John Ondrasik
- Patton Oswalt
- Paula Jai Parker
- Steve Perkins & Dave Navarro
- Liz Phair
- Kate Pierson
- Bronson Pinchot
- Pink
- Stefanie Powers
- Lindsay Price*
- Danny Provenzano
- Rachel Quaintance
- Donnell Rawlings
- Mary Lou Retton
- Mo Rocca
- Henry Rollins
- David Lee Roth
- Darius Rucker
- Richie Sambora
- Emma Samms
- Fred Schneider & Cindy Wilson
- Rick Schroder
- Dennis Seaton*
- Charlie Sheen
- Pauly Shore
- Rena Sofer & Jay Harrington*
- Hal Sparks
- Frank Stallone
- Joel Stein
- Taboo & Fergie
- Rob Thomas
- Lea Thompson
- Triumph the Insult Comic Dog
- Brian Unger
- Usher
- Frank Vincent & Vincent Pastore
- Jenna Von Oy
- Gedde Watanabe
- Jody Watley
- Chuck Woolery
- Adrian Young
- Young MC
- Adrian Zmed
- Rob Zombie

(*) = archival footage

== Recurring segments ==
- Donal Logue's Unfinished Thoughts: Donal Logue gives an unfinished thought on a pop culture event from each year.
- Break Up Songs: Boy George presents the breakup songs for each year.
- Hip-Hop Jam: Doug E. Fresh presents the hip-hop jam for each year.
- Public Service Announcement: A public service announcement from each year is presented.
- Nerds: Gedde Watanabe presents the nerds for each year.
- What the F#?%!!! Moment: Gilbert Gottfried presents the biggest blunders of the year.
- During the credits of every episode, a clip from a popular music video was played without any type of commentary. These were usually replaced with a show promo by VH1.

== Topics covered by year ==
=== 1980 ===
- American Gigolo
- Too Close for Comfort
- "Whip It" by Devo
- Richie Rich
- Grey Poupon
- Superman II
- The Plastic Man Comedy/Adventure Show
- Flash Gordon
- "Rock with You" by Michael Jackson
- Real People
- The Blues Brothers
- Eight Is Enough
- Solid Gold
- Satin jackets
- Stir Crazy
- Private Benjamin
- Alice
- Friendship bracelets and ribbon barrettes
- "I Want You to Want Me" by Cheap Trick (originally recorded live in 1978)
- Hungry Hungry Hippos
- Friday the 13th

Donal Logue's Unfinished Thoughts on Superman

Break Up Songs of 1980: "Boys Don't Cry" by The Cure, "Please Don't Go" by KC and the Sunshine Band and "You've Lost That Lovin' Feelin'" by Hall & Oates

Hip-Hop Jam of 1980: "Rapper's Delight" by The Sugarhill Gang

PSA of 1980: The Bod Squad's "Don't Drown Your Food" PSA (healthy eating)

Nerds of 1980: Steve Jobs, Elvis Costello and C-3PO

The What The F#?%!!! Moment of 1980: The Chipmunks released a novelty rock album called Chipmunk Punk.

=== 1981 ===
- Dynasty
- The Smurfs
- Journey's Escape album
- On Golden Pond
- "The Stroke" by Billy Squier
- Endless Love
- Magnum, P.I.
- "Super Freak" by Rick James
- Iron-on decals
- The Fall Guy
- The Rolling Stones' Tattoo You Tour
- Fernando Valenzuela
- Hart to Hart
- Benetton
- Benson
- Ronald Reagan likes Jelly Belly
- Jelly shoes
- Clash of the Titans
- Simon and Garfunkel's concert in Central Park
- Mommie Dearest

Donal Logue's Unfinished Thoughts on Journey

Break Up Songs of 1981: "Since You're Gone" by The Cars, "Don't You Want Me" by The Human League and "The Breakup Song (They Don't Write 'Em)" by The Greg Kihn Band

Hip-Hop Jam of 1981: "The Breaks" by Kurtis Blow

PSA of 1981: Think Before You Drink (Anti-Drinking Ad starring Brooke Shields)

Nerds of 1981: Prince Charles, Ric Ocasek and Bill Gates

The What The F#?%!!! Moment of 1981: The USDA proposes to cut school lunch programs by classifying ketchup as a vegetable

=== 1982 ===
- Fame
- Annie
- "Abracadabra" by Steve Miller Band
- Tootsie
- ColecoVision
- John Mellencamp
- Wayne Gretzky
- "Gloria" by Laura Branigan
- The Toy
- Conan the Barbarian and The Beastmaster
- Men at Work
- KangaRoos
- Mad Max 2: The Road Warrior (originally released in 1981)
- T. J. Hooker
- "I'm So Excited" by The Pointer Sisters
- An Officer and a Gentleman
- G.I. Joe: A Real American Hero
- "Pass the Dutchie" by Musical Youth
- Pink Floyd – The Wall
- Star Trek II: The Wrath of Khan

Donal Logue's Unfinished Thoughts on The Beastmaster

Break Up Songs of 1982: "Do You Really Want to Hurt Me" by Culture Club, "Only Time Will Tell" by Asia and "Harden My Heart" by Quarterflash

Hip-Hop Jam of 1982: "Planet Rock" by Afrika Bambaataa & the Soulsonic Force

PSA of 1982: Alternate Escape Routes in case of a fire ("Learn not to burn") Starring Dick Van Dyke

Nerds of 1982: Thomas Dolby, Irwin "Skippy" Handelman and Sarah Jessica Parker

The What The F#?%!!! Moment of 1982: Yale University offers a 14-week course on mastering the Rubik's Cube

=== 1983 ===
- Richard Simmons
- "All Night Long (All Night)" by Lionel Richie
- Staying Alive
- Klondike bar
- The Thorn Birds
- Risky Business
- Sunglasses
- The Day After
- The Outsiders
- Cujo and Christine
- Snausages (dog treats)
- Chicken McNuggets
- "Rock This Town" by Stray Cats
- Donkey Kong
- Culture Club
- Yentl
- KISS takes off their makeup
- Martina Navratilova
- Fraggle Rock
- V

Donal Logue's Unfinished Thoughts on The Day After and Snausages

Break Up Songs of 1983: "Total Eclipse of the Heart" by Bonnie Tyler, "Separate Ways (Worlds Apart)" by Journey and "Always Something There to Remind Me" by Naked Eyes

Hip-Hop Jam of 1983: "White Lines (Don't Don't Do It) by Grandmaster Melle Mel

PSA of 1983: "We're not candy!" (about kids finding pills out of the bottle and accidentally eating them) by the Poison Control Center

Nerds of 1983: Nerds Candy, LeVar Burton and Simon Seville of the Chipmunks

The What The F#?%!!! Moment of 1983: The Beach Boys were banned from playing a concert at the National Mall

=== 1984 ===
- The Karate Kid
- Van Halen's 1984 album
- The wave
- "Drive" by The Cars
- Beverly Hills Cop
- Cagney & Lacey
- Menudo
- Scratch and sniff and Trapper Keeper
- A Nightmare on Elm Street
- Thompson Twins
- My Little Pony and Glo Worm
- "Somebody's Watching Me" by Rockwell
- Tom Hanks in Splash and Bachelor Party
- Gremlins
- The Burning Bed
- Tina Turner
- Stirrup pants
- Billy Idol
- Revenge of the Nerds

Donal Logue's Unfinished Thoughts on Scratch and Sniff

Break Up Songs of 1984: "Sister Christian" by Night Ranger, "Hard Habit to Break" by Chicago and "Oh Sherrie" by Steve Perry

Hip-Hop Jam of 1984: "Roxanne, Roxanne" by UTFO

PSA of 1984: McGruff the Crime Dog's "Take A Bite Out of Crime" (subject: getting into cars with strangers)

Nerds of 1984: Ed Grimley, Alex Trebek and Long Duk Dong

The What The F#?%!!! Moment of 1984: Ronald Reagan makes an off-the-record joke about outlawing and bombing Russia

=== 1985 ===
- Lifestyles of the Rich and Famous
- Rambo: First Blood Part II
- Crack epidemic
- "You Spin Me Round (Like a Record)" by Dead or Alive
- Teen Wolf
- Inspector Gadget
- Remington Steele
- "Rock Me Amadeus" by Falco
- Jenga
- Tears for Fears
- Bobby Knight's explosive temper and getting ejected from the game vs. Purdue
- The People's Court
- "That's What Friends Are For" by Dionne Warwick, Elton John, Gladys Knight and Stevie Wonder
- 227
- North and South
- "I Want to Know What Love Is" by Foreigner
- Mr. Belvedere
- New Coke
- Jem
- Weird Science

Donal Logue's Unfinished Thoughts on crack cocaine

Break Up Songs of 1985: "Broken Wings" by Mr. Mister, "I Miss You" by Klymaxx and "Don't You (Forget About Me)" by Simple Minds

Hip-Hop Jam of 1985: "The Show" by Doug E. Fresh

PSA of 1985: Bob Barker about AIDS (debunking the misconception of getting AIDS from cats)

Nerds of 1985: Crispin Glover, Lukas Haas and Larry King

The What The F#?%!!! Moment of 1985: The "mystical unicorns" from Ringling Bros. and Barnum & Bailey Circus were actually goats with surgically-fused horns

=== 1986 ===
- Pee-wee's Playhouse
- Jolt Cola
- Bon Jovi's Slippery When Wet album
- LA Gear
- "You Can Call Me Al" by Paul Simon
- Soul Man
- Rainbow Brite
- "Walk Like an Egyptian" by The Bangles
- Dallas episode "Bobby Ewing Comes Back to Life" (aka "Blast from the Past")
- Howard the Duck
- About Last Night...
- The Mystery of Al Capone's Vaults
- Ocean Pacific
- "Conga" by Gloria Estefan and Miami Sound Machine
- L.A. Law
- The Golden Child
- Double Dare
- Garbage Pail Kids
- Michael Jordan
- "Heartbeat" by Don Johnson
- Joe Isuzu
- The Fly

Donal Logue's Unfinished Thoughts on Bon Jovi

Break Up Songs of 1986: "No One Is to Blame" by Howard Jones, "Don't Dream It's Over" by Crowded House and "If You Leave" by Orchestral Manoeuvres in the Dark

Hip-Hop Jam of 1986: "Walk This Way" by Run-D.M.C. and Aerosmith

PSA of 1986: Rock Against Drugs (Aimee Mann of 'Til Tuesday)

Nerds of 1986: Willie Tanner, Rick Moranis and Cliff Clavin

The What The F#?%!!! Moment of 1986: Fred Grandy decided to run for Congress in Iowa, and he won

=== 1987 ===
- Beauty and the Beast
- "Here I Go Again" by Whitesnake
- Scruples
- The Fat Boys
- Flowers in the Attic
- LL Cool J
- Macho Movies (specifically Predator, RoboCop, and Over the Top)
- Doc Martens
- "Bad" by Michael Jackson
- Full House
- Less than Zero
- Jody Watley
- Remote Control
- Biker shorts (Lycra)
- ThunderCats
- Raising Arizona
- "Luka" by Suzanne Vega
- A Different World
- "Land of Confusion" by Genesis
- Steve Guttenberg
- The Princess Bride

Donal Logue's Unfinished Thoughts on Scruples

Break Up Songs of 1987: "With or Without You" by U2, "Didn't We Almost Have It All" by Whitney Houston and "I Won't Forget You" by Poison

Hip-Hop Jam of 1987: "Push It" by Salt-n-Pepa & Spinderella

PSA of 1987: Rock Against Drugs (Anti-Drug)

Nerds of 1987: Revenge of the Nerds II: Nerds in Paradise, Bud Bundy and Gilbert Gottfried

The What The F#?%!!! Moment of 1987: Vanna White's autobiography Vanna Speaks became a bestseller.

=== 1988 ===
- Big
- Growing Pains
- MTV's Headbangers Ball
- Ripped jeans
- Beetlejuice
- Who Framed Roger Rabbit
- "Get Outta My Dreams, Get Into My Car" by Billy Ocean
- Jamaica national bobsled team
- My Two Dads
- Garfield stuffed animals
- Beaches
- Charles in Charge
- A Fish Called Wanda
- Ickey Woods (The "Ickey Shuffle") and the Bash Brothers (Jose Canseco and Mark McGwire)
- Hypercolor T-shirts
- "Pour Some Sugar On Me" by Def Leppard
- Young Guns
- Alternative rock (specifically R.E.M., Jane's Addiction, and Sonic Youth)
- Vice President George H. W. Bush elected President of the United States
- Chia Pet
- Tracy Chapman
- Coming to America

Donal Logue's Unfinished Thoughts on Garfield

Break Up Songs of 1988: "Every Rose Has Its Thorn" by Poison, "Don't Know What You Got (Till It's Gone)" by Cinderella and "Look Away" by Chicago

Hip-Hop Jam of 1988: "Mary, Mary" by Run-D.M.C.

PSA of 1988: Sylvester Stallone for Give The Gift Of Literacy

Nerds of 1988: Mike Mills, Paul Pfeiffer and Miles Silverberg

The What The F#?%!!! Moment of 1988: The final episode of St. Elsewhere revealed that the series was a figment of the little boy's imagination

=== 1989 ===
- Weekend at Bernie's
- Doogie Howser, M.D.
- "I Wanna Have Some Fun" by Samantha Fox
- The Clapper
- Field of Dreams
- Pete Rose
- "Just a Friend" by Biz Markie
- Thirtysomething
- Yuppie
- Richard Marx
- Driving Miss Daisy
- Zsa Zsa Gabor slaps a cop
- "Patience" by Guns N' Roses
- Rock N Roll Flowers (sound detection dancing flowers)
- Beastie Boys' Paul's Boutique album
- Bo Jackson
- Designing Women
- York Peppermint Pattie
- House of Style
- Choose Your Own Adventure books
- When Harry Met Sally...

Donal Logue's Unfinished Thoughts on Pete Rose

Break Up Songs of 1989: "How Am I Supposed to Live Without You" by Michael Bolton, "Miss You Much" by Janet Jackson and "Free Fallin'" by Tom Petty

Hip-Hop Jam of 1989: "Don't Believe the Hype" by Public Enemy

PSA of 1989: Magic Johnson on Designated Drivers

Nerds of 1989: Samuel "Screech" Powers, Woody Allen and Steve Urkel

The What The F#?%!!! Moment of 1989: 87-year-old Carrie Stringfellow nearly gets embalmed after being mistaken for dead at a Springfield, Ohio funeral home

Preceded by I Love the '70s (American TV series)	I Love the '80s Strikes Back	Next: I Love the '90s
