= I Love the '80s (American TV series) =

2002 American TV series

- Genre: Documentary
- Written by: James Eatock
- Narrated by: Doug Jeffers
- Country of origin: United States
- Original language: English
- No. of seasons: 1
- No. of episodes: 10

Production
- Running time: 41 min.

Original release
- Network: VH1
- Release: December 16 – December 20, 2002

Related
- I Love the '70s (British TV series); I Love the '80s (British TV series); I Love the '90s (British TV series); I Love the '70s (American TV series); I Love the '80s Strikes Back; I Love the '90s (American TV series); I Love the '90s: Part Deux; I Love the '80s 3-D; I Love the Holidays; I Love Toys; I Love the '70s: Volume 2 I Love the New Millennium; Best of I Love the... I Love the 2000s

I Love the '80s is a 1980s nostalgia television program and the first installment of the I Love the... series that was produced by VH1, based on the BBC series of the same name.

The first episode, "I Love 1980", premiered on December 16, 2002, and the final episode, "I Love 1989", premiered on December 20, 2002.

== Commentators ==
- Sasha Alexander
- Anastacia
- Apollonia
- India.Arie
- Tom Arnold
- Christopher Atkins
- Sebastian Bach
- Jillian Barberie
- Barenaked Ladies (Steven Page, Tyler Stewart and Ed Robertson)
- Toni Basil
- Bill Bellamy and Peter Facinelli
- Richard Belzer
- Beyoncé
- Michael Ian Black
- Jack Blades
- Brian Boitano
- Brian Bonsall
- Meredith Brooks
- David Bryan
- Candace Cameron Bure
- Jere Burns and Suzanne Pleshette
- Timothy Busfield
- Dean Cain
- Carrot Top
- Tom Cavanagh
- Andrew Dice Clay
- Clarence Clemons
- Gary Cole
- Mo Collins
- Alice Cooper
- Anderson Cooper
- David Copperfield
- Creed (Scott Phillips, Scott Stapp and Mark Tremonti) (*)
- Tommy Davidson
- Dana Delany
- Mark Derwin
- Dustin Diamond
- Brooke Dillman and Constance Zimmer
- Simon Doonan
- Karen Duffy
- Rich Eisen
- Joe Elliott
- Melissa Etheridge
- Mark Feuerstein and Ashley Williams
- Kim Fields
- Greg Fitzsimmons
- Heidi Fleiss
- Dann Florek
- Larry Flynt
- Ben Folds
- Foo Fighters (Dave Grohl and Taylor Hawkins) (*)
- Matthew Fox
- Doug E. Fresh
- Soleil Moon Frye
- Daisy Fuentes
- Peter Gabriel
- Willie Garson
- Marla Gibbs
- Judy Gold
- Cuba Gooding, Jr.
- David Gray
- Kathy Griffin
- Sammy Hagar
- Ken Hakuta
- Rob Halford
- Mariska Hargitay
- Dennis Haskins
- Tommy Heath
- Sherman Hemsley
- Marilu Henner
- Natasha Henstridge
- Jason Hervey
- Faith Hill
- Cheryl Hines
- Mark Hoppus
- Finola Hughes
- Bonnie Hunt
- Alan Hunter
- Ice-T
- Chris Isaak
- Rick James
- Ron Jeremy
- Betsey Johnson
- Cherie Johnson
- Greg Kihn
- Kool & the Gang (Ronald Bell and Robert "Kool" Bell)
- Uncle Kracker
- Brian Krause
- Wallace Langham
- Sharon Lawrence
- Juliette Lewis
- Lisa Ling
- Lisa Lisa
- Lisa Loeb
- Kenny Loggins
- Donal Logue
- Justin Long
- George Lopez and Constance Marie
- Mario Lopez
- Traci Lords
- Virginia Madsen
- A Martinez
- John Mayer
- Walta McCarthy
- Mark McGrath
- AJ McLean
- Julian McMahon
- Chris Meloni
- Bret Michaels
- Daryl "Chill" Mitchell
- Monica
- Eddie Money
- Paul Mooney
- Michael Moore
- Marianne Muellerleile
- Dave Mustaine
- Mya
- Nickelback (Ryan Peake and Chad Kroeger)
- Terri Nunn
- Patton Oswalt
- Erik Palladino
- Ray Parker Jr.
- Nia Peeples
- Tom Petty
- Anita Pointer
- Brian Posehn
- Scott Poulson-Bryant
- Rain Pryor
- Josh Randall
- Quiet Riot (Kevin DuBrow and Frankie Banali)
- Leah Remini
- Mary Lou Retton
- Alfonso Ribeiro
- Christina Ricci (*)
- Lionel Richie
- LeAnn Rimes
- Mo Rocca
- Nile Rodgers
- Freddy Rodriguez
- Henry Rollins
- Jeffrey Ross
- Kelly Rowland
- Kevin Rowland
- Darius Rucker
- John Rzeznik
- Richie Sambora
- Tessie Santiago and Matt Letscher
- Mia Sara
- Dan Savage
- Ricky Schroder
- Stuart Scott
- Jason Sehorn
- Tommy Shaw
- Michael Showalter
- Molly Sims (*)
- Dee Snider
- Kevin Sorbo
- Hal Sparks
- Joel Stein
- Kristy Swanson
- Raven-Symoné
- Robby Takac
- Rob Thomas
- Lea Thompson
- Tiffany
- Christopher Titus
- John Travolta (*)
- Aisha Tyler
- Victor Webster
- Kevin Weisman
- JoBeth Williams
- Debra Wilson
- Nancy and Ann Wilson
- Peter Wolf
- B.D. Wong
- Tom Wopat
- Wyclef
- Weird Al
- Jacklyn Zeman

(*) = archive footage

== Recurring segments ==
- Makeout Songs: Lionel Richie presents the love songs from each year.
- Babes: Bret Michaels presents the attractive female celebrities or fictional characters from each year.
- Hunks: Traci Lords presents the attractive male celebrities from each year.
- Public Service Announcement: A public service announcement (PSA) from each year is presented.
- Then and Now: "Weird Al" Yankovic compares trends of the given year and the present day.
- Mr. & Ms.: Andrew Dice Clay presents a male celebrity and a female celebrity of each year.
- Born In: Soleil Moon Frye presents the people, bands, and products that were born in each year.
- During the credits of every episode, a clip from a popular music video was played without any type of commentary. These were usually replaced with a show promo by Vh1.

== Topics covered by year ==
=== 1980 ===
- The Love Boat
- Caddyshack
- "Turning Japanese" by The Vapors
- Punk and preppy fashion
- Strawberry Shortcake
- Brooke Shields
- Designer jeans
- "All Out of Love" by Air Supply
- Pat Benatar and Debbie Harry
- Who shot J.R.?
- 9 to 5
- Urban Cowboy
- "Another One Bites the Dust" by Queen
- Kenny Rogers
- Xanadu
- Airplane!
- "Rapper's Delight" by The Sugarhill Gang
- "Brass in Pocket" by The Pretenders
- Mattel Electronic Football
- Miracle on Ice
- That's Incredible!
- The Empire Strikes Back

Makeout Songs of 1980: "Every Woman in the World" by Air Supply, "Longer" by Dan Fogelberg and "Do That to Me One More Time" by Captain & Tennille

Babes of 1980: Princess Leia, Bo Derek, Charlene Tilton, Victoria Principal and Suzanne Somers

Hunks of 1980: Richard Gere, Jim Palmer, John Travolta, Erik Estrada and Greg Evigan

PSA of 1980: Give a Kid a Book PSA

Then and Now 1980: Sony Walkman with Cassette (Then: $169.00 / Now: $19.95), Ross Harris (Then: Movie star of Airplane! / Now: Video star of "Sad Caper" by Hootie and the Blowfish) and The Big Gulp (Then: 32 oz. / Now: 64 oz.)

Mr. & Ms. 1980: Ronald Reagan and Daisy Duke

Born in 1980: Christina Aguilera, Post-it notes, ethnic Barbie dolls and Macaulay Culkin

=== 1981 ===
- Cable television, MTV, and scrambled pornography
- Porky's
- Reagan assassination attempt
- Pope John Paul II assassination attempt
- The Royal Wedding
- Luke and Laura Spencer
- Rick Springfield
- Arthur
- The Greatest American Hero
- DMC DeLorean
- Rubik's Cube
- "Celebration" by Kool & the Gang
- Fridays
- Stripes
- Bosom Buddies
- John McEnroe
- "Private Eyes" by Hall & Oates
- Members Only jackets
- Atari 2600
- The Jeffersons
- Raiders of the Lost Ark

Makeout Songs of 1981: "Keep on Loving You" by REO Speedwagon, "Waiting for a Girl Like You" by Foreigner and "Endless Love" by Lionel Richie and Diana Ross

Babes of 1981: Olivia Newton-John, Donna Dixon, Valerie Bertinelli, Kathleen Turner and Sandra Day O'Connor

Hunks of 1981: Patrick Duffy, Burt Reynolds, Harrison Ford, Mick Jagger and Richard Simmons

PSA of 1981: Girl Scouts in Gymnastics

Then and Now 1981: Tom Cruise (Then: Endless Love - $33 Million / Now: Endless Cash - $25 Million), Movie Tickets (Then: $3.00 / Now: $10.00) and Suntan Lotion (Then: Tanning oil / Now: Hawaiian Tropic Ozone SPF 70)

Mr. & Ms. 1981: Tom Selleck and Sheena Easton

Born in 1981: Alicia Keys, Beyoncé, the laptop computer, Justin Timberlake, Britney Spears, the thong, Serena Williams and Metallica

=== 1982 ===
- Mullets
- VJs
- "Mickey" by Toni Basil
- Fast Times at Ridgemont High
- "Centerfold" by The J. Geils Band
- Square Pegs
- Rocky III
- Ozzy Osbourne
- "I Love Rock 'N Roll" by Joan Jett & the Blackhearts
- The Dukes of Hazzard
- The Go-Go's
- Aerobics
- "I Ran (So Far Away)" by A Flock of Seagulls
- Trivial Pursuit
- Keytar
- Joanie Loves Chachi
- Pac-Man and Ms. Pac-Man
- "867-5309/Jenny" by Tommy Tutone
- Dungeons & Dragons
- Poltergeist
- "The Message" by Grandmaster Flash and the Furious Five
- Silver Spoons
- E.T. the Extra-Terrestrial

Makeout Songs of 1982: "Up Where We Belong" by Joe Cocker & Jennifer Warnes and "Truly" by Lionel Richie

Babes of 1982: Kim Wilde, Rae Dawn Chong, Kirstie Alley, Pia Zadora and Tootsie

Hunks of 1982: John Stamos, David Lee Roth, Sting, Bruce Springsteen and the Soloflex Guy

PSA of 1982: Time for Timer's "Sunshine on a Stick" PSA

Then and Now 1982: Cats (Then: On Broadway now and forever / Now: Gone), Scott Schwartz (Then: Child star of The Toy / Now: Porn star) and Concert Tickets for The Who (Then: Farewell tour - $25.00 / Now: Reunion tour - $250.00)

Mr. & Ms. 1982: Eddie Murphy and Heather Locklear

Born in 1982: Kirsten Dunst, Prince William, Diet Coke, Public Enemy and liposuction

=== 1983 ===
- National Lampoon's Vacation
- Family Ties
- Nancy Reagan guest stars on Diff'rent Strokes
- Cabbage Patch Kids
- Michael Jackson's Thriller album
- Flashdance
- Duran Duran
- Valley girl
- "Love Is a Battlefield" by Pat Benatar
- Scarface
- The A-Team
- Def Leppard's Pyromania album
- Eddie Murphy Delirious
- "Come on Eileen" by Dexys Midnight Runners
- Jerry Falwell vs. Larry Flynt
- Knight Rider
- WarGames
- Wacky WallWalker
- "Mr. Roboto" by Styx
- He-Man and the Masters of the Universe
- Return of the Jedi

Makeout Songs of 1983: "Every Breath You Take" by The Police, "True" by Spandau Ballet and "Sexual Healing" by Marvin Gaye

Babes of 1983: Maud Adams, Vanity, Joan Collins, Christie Brinkley and Rebecca De Mornay

Hunks of 1983: Lee Horsley, Rob Lowe, Marvin Gaye, Bruce Boxleitner and Chewbacca

PSA of 1983: Smokey Bear - Mask of Joanna Cassidy

Then and Now 1983: Talent Shows (Then: Star Search / Now: American Idol), Cellular Phones (Then: $3,000 / Now: Given Away) and Home Video Cameras (Then: Sony Betamovie - 6.5 lbs. / Now: Sony MicroMV Handycam - 12 oz.)

Mr. & Ms. 1983: Tom Cruise and Ms. Pac-Man

Born in 1983: Michelle Branch, Bon Jovi, the Nintendo Entertainment System, Taylor Hanson and the Red Hot Chili Peppers

=== 1984 ===
- Breakdancing and Breakin'
- Footloose
- Madonna
- "Sunglasses at Night" by Corey Hart
- "Where's the beef?"
- Bruce Springsteen's Born in the U.S.A. album
- Mary Lou Retton
- Webster and Punky Brewster
- Huey Lewis and the News
- Miami Vice
- The Terminator
- Transformers and Care Bears
- Wham!
- Prince
- Sixteen Candles
- Cyndi Lauper
- Michael Jackson's Pepsi commercial disaster
- "Hello" by Lionel Richie
- This Is Spinal Tap

Makeout Songs of 1984: "Almost Paradise" by Mike Reno & Ann Wilson, "Against All Odds (Take a Look at Me Now)" by Phil Collins and "Missing You" by John Waite

Babes of 1984: Paulina Porizkova, Daryl Hannah, Tina Turner, Heather Thomas and Geraldine Ferraro

Hunks of 1984: Ralph Macchio, Matt Dillon, C. Thomas Howell, Duran Duran and Tom Hulce

PSA of 1984: "Don't let your lungs go to pot." - Cast of Fame

Then and Now 1984: Recreational Family Vehicles (Then: Chrysler Caravan - $8,669 / Now: Ford Explorer - $24,620), Super Bowl Tickets (Then: $60.00 / Now: $325.00) and The Mac (Then: 131,000 bytes of memory / Now: 500,000,000 bytes of memory)

Mr. & Ms. 1984: Boy George

Born in 1984: Mandy Moore, Freddy Krueger, Kelly Osbourne, hair mousse and Punky Brewster

=== 1985 ===
- WrestleMania
- MacGyver
- Back to the Future
- "Home Sweet Home" by Mötley Crüe
- The Goonies
- Pee-wee's Big Adventure
- Small Wonder
- "Summer of '69" by Bryan Adams
- Big hair
- Fletch
- "The Super Bowl Shuffle"
- Bartles & Jaymes
- Cocoon
- "Voices Carry" by 'Til Tuesday
- Live Aid
- The Facts of Life
- "Party All the Time" by Eddie Murphy
- The Breakfast Club and St. Elmo's Fire
- Day-Glo and oversized message T-shirts
- Pound Puppies
- "We Are the World" by USA for Africa and heavy metal musicians form Hear 'n Aid

Makeout Songs of 1985: "Careless Whisper" by Wham!, "Smooth Operator" by Sade and "Crazy for You" by Madonna

Babes of 1985: Kelly LeBrock, Kelly McGillis, Rosanna Arquette, Grace Slick and Tipper Gore

Hunks of 1985: Sylvester Stallone, William "The Refrigerator" Perry, Robert Redford, Jim McMahon and Pee-wee Herman

PSA of 1985: Contract for Life

Then and Now 1985: Hit Soft Drinks (Then: New Coke / Now: Vanilla Coke) and Pro Wrestling (Then: Hulk Hogan / Now: The Rock)

Mr. & Ms. 1985: Dolph Lundgren and Brigitte Nielsen

Born in 1985: Zac Hanson, Air Jordans, Frankie Muniz, Lee Press-On Nails and VH1

=== 1986 ===
- Ferris Bueller's Day Off
- Wheel of Fortune
- Hands Across America
- Teddy Ruxpin
- ALF
- Pretty in Pink
- "Papa Don't Preach" by Madonna
- Swatch
- 1986 World Series and the Bill Buckner fielding error
- The Cosby Show
- Baby On Board
- Crocodile Dundee
- Celebrity marriages (specifically Tommy Lee & Heather Locklear, Arnold Schwarzenegger & Maria Shriver and Tatum O'Neal & John McEnroe)
- Whitney Houston
- Comic Relief USA
- Janet Jackson's Control album
- Stand by Me
- "Walk This Way" by Run-DMC and Aerosmith
- Top Gun

Makeout Songs of 1986: "Take My Breath Away" by Berlin, "The Next Time I Fall" by Peter Cetera & Amy Grant and "Secret Lovers" by Atlantic Starr

Babes of 1986: Susanna Hoffs, Kim Basinger, Stevie Nicks, Bette Midler and the Statue of Liberty

Hunks of 1986: Tom Cruise, Walter Payton, Paul Hogan, Keith Hernandez and Howard the Duck

PSA of 1986: "Vote With A Friend. Make It Count More" with Quincy Jones and James Ingram

Then and Now 1986: Highest Baseball Salary (Then: Gary Carter - $2 Million / Now: Alex Rodriguez - $22 Million), David Lee Roth & Sammy Hagar (Then: Rivals / Now: Together) and Ted Danson & Kelsey Grammer (Then: Ted Danson making $45,000 an episode on Cheers / Now: Kelsey Grammer making $1,600,000 an episode on Frasier)

Mr. & Ms. 1986: Mike Tyson and Oprah Winfrey

Born in 1986: The Olsen twins (Mary-Kate and Ashley), the Goo Goo Dolls, Jolt Cola, the Pixies and the disposable camera

=== 1987 ===
- Dirty Dancing
- Tiffany and Debbie Gibson
- Hair crimping
- Lisa Lisa and Cult Jam
- Fatal Attraction
- Hair metal (specifically Poison, Bon Jovi, Def Leppard, and Mötley Crüe)
- FOX (specifically The Tracey Ullman Show, Married... with Children and 21 Jump Street)
- "It's the End of the World as We Know It (And I Feel Fine)" by R.E.M.
- Controversial extra-marital affairs (specifically Oliver North and Fawn Hall, Gary Hart and Donna Rice, Jim and Tammy Faye Bakker and Jessica Hahn)
- Wall Street
- "(You Gotta) Fight for Your Right (To Party!)" by Beastie Boys
- Acid wash and Converse
- Cheers
- "Push It" by Salt-N-Pepa
- Hollywood Shuffle
- "Addicted to Love" by Robert Palmer
- The Two Coreys (Corey Feldman and Corey Haim)
- U2's The Joshua Tree album

Makeout Songs of 1987: "At This Moment" by Billy Vera & The Beaters, "Don't Dream It's Over" by Crowded House and "I Need Love" by LL Cool J

Babes of 1987: Lisa Bonet, Sheena Easton, Jody Watley, Tawny Kitaen and the Church Lady

Hunks of 1987: LL Cool J, RoboCop, Dennis Quaid, Harry Hamlin and Harry from Harry and the Hendersons

PSA of 1987: Anti-Drug (Marijuana): "I learned it by watching you!"

Then and Now 1987: Richest Person in America (Then: Sam Walton - $4,500,000,000 / Now: Bill Gates - $43,000,000,000), Baby Jessica (Then: Stuck in a well / Now: Well adjusted) and Axl Rose (Then: New face of rock 'n' roll / Now: New face)

Mr. & Ms. 1987: Bruce Willis and Cher

Born in 1987: Lil' Bow Wow, Aaron Carter, Nirvana and condom commercials

=== 1988 ===
- Mike Tyson
- Child's Play
- Roseanne
- "Never Gonna Give You Up" by Rick Astley
- Guns N' Roses' Appetite for Destruction album
- The Wonder Years
- Modern Rock (specifically INXS, The Cure, Morrissey, Depeche Mode, and Erasure)
- Teenage Mutant Ninja Turtles
- "Don't Worry, Be Happy" by Bobby McFerrin
- The California Raisins
- Perfect Strangers
- George Michael's Faith album
- Pictionary and Win, Lose or Draw
- "Red Red Wine" by UB40
- Working woman's wardrobe and Color Me Beautiful
- Hip hop music (specifically Yo! MTV Raps, "Parents Just Don't Understand" by DJ Jazzy Jeff & the Fresh Prince, and the rise of gangsta rap (specifically N.W.A))
- Who's the Boss?
- Terence Trent D'Arby
- The neo-hippie movement
- "Touch of Grey" by Grateful Dead
- Rain Man

Makeout Songs of 1988: "She's Like the Wind" by Patrick Swayze, "Hold On to the Nights" by Richard Marx and "The Flame" by Cheap Trick

Babes of 1988: Jessica Rabbit, Kari Wuhrer, Samantha Fox, Julia Roberts and Divine

Hunks of 1988: John F. Kennedy Jr., Donald Trump, Kevin Costner, Joe Montana and Dan Quayle

PSA of 1988: Buckle Up (Car Crash Test Dummies)

Then and Now 1988: A Year of Tuition at Harvard (Then: $12,000 / Now: $35,000), Ricki Lake (Then: 250 lbs. / Now: 120 lbs.) and 100-Meter Sprint (Then: Ben Johnson - 9.79 seconds / Now: Tim Montgomery - 9.78 seconds)

Mr. and Ms. 1988: ALF and Debbie Gibson

Born in 1988: Haley Joel Osment, Teddy Grahams, Miami Heat, En Vogue and Prozac

=== 1989 ===
- New Kids on the Block
- Bill and Ted's Excellent Adventure
- Milli Vanilli
- Game Boy and Tetris
- Cops
- Rob Lowe's sex video
- "If I Could Turn Back Time" by Cher
- Do the Right Thing
- "Like a Prayer" by Madonna, and the ensuing Pepsi controversy
- Say Anything...
- The Arsenio Hall Show
- "Love Shack" by The B-52's
- Bobby Brown
- Afrocentric clothing
- Baywatch
- "Love in an Elevator" by Aerosmith
- Heathers
- Saved by the Bell
- "Funky Cold Medina" by Tone Loc
- Fall of the Berlin Wall

Makeout Songs of 1989: "Right Here Waiting" by Richard Marx, "If You Don't Know Me by Now" by Simply Red and "Lovesong" by The Cure

Babes of 1989: Winona Ryder, Paula Abdul, Tiffani-Amber Thiessen, Claudia Schiffer and Barbara Bush

Hunks of 1989: Batman, The Joker, Johnny Depp, Mel Gibson and Leonardo

PSA of 1989: Madonna on AIDS Prevention

Then and Now 1989: Bushes (Then: George H. W. Bush / Now: George W. Bush), Justin Timberlake (Then: Mouseketeer / Now: Michael Jackson) and World Wide Web (Then: Dialing up / Now: Off the hook)

Mr. and Ms. 1989: Fab Morvan and Meg Ryan

Born in 1989: Daniel Radcliffe, Hole, Hootie & the Blowfish, Lil' Romeo and American Gladiators

Preceded by I Love the '90s (British TV series)	I Love the '80s (American TV series)	Next: I Love the '70s (American TV series)
