= Members Only (fashion brand) =

Fashion brand noted for jackets

- Industry: Retail
- Founded: 1975
- Headquarters: New York City, U.S.
- Products: Clothing
- Parent: MO 1975
- Website: www.membersonly.com

Members Only is an American brand of clothing that became popular in the 1980s with its line of jackets. The brand was created in 1975 by men's clothing entrepreneur Herb Goldsmith and first introduced to domestic American markets in 1980 by Europe Craft Imports. Members Only racer jackets were distinguished by their narrow epaulettes and collar strap and their knitted trim; they were manufactured in a wide variety of colors. Their advertising tagline was "when you put it on, something happens".

In the 2010s, Members Only continued to launch seasonal collections carried at online retailers as well as brick-and-mortar stores such as Urban Outfitters.

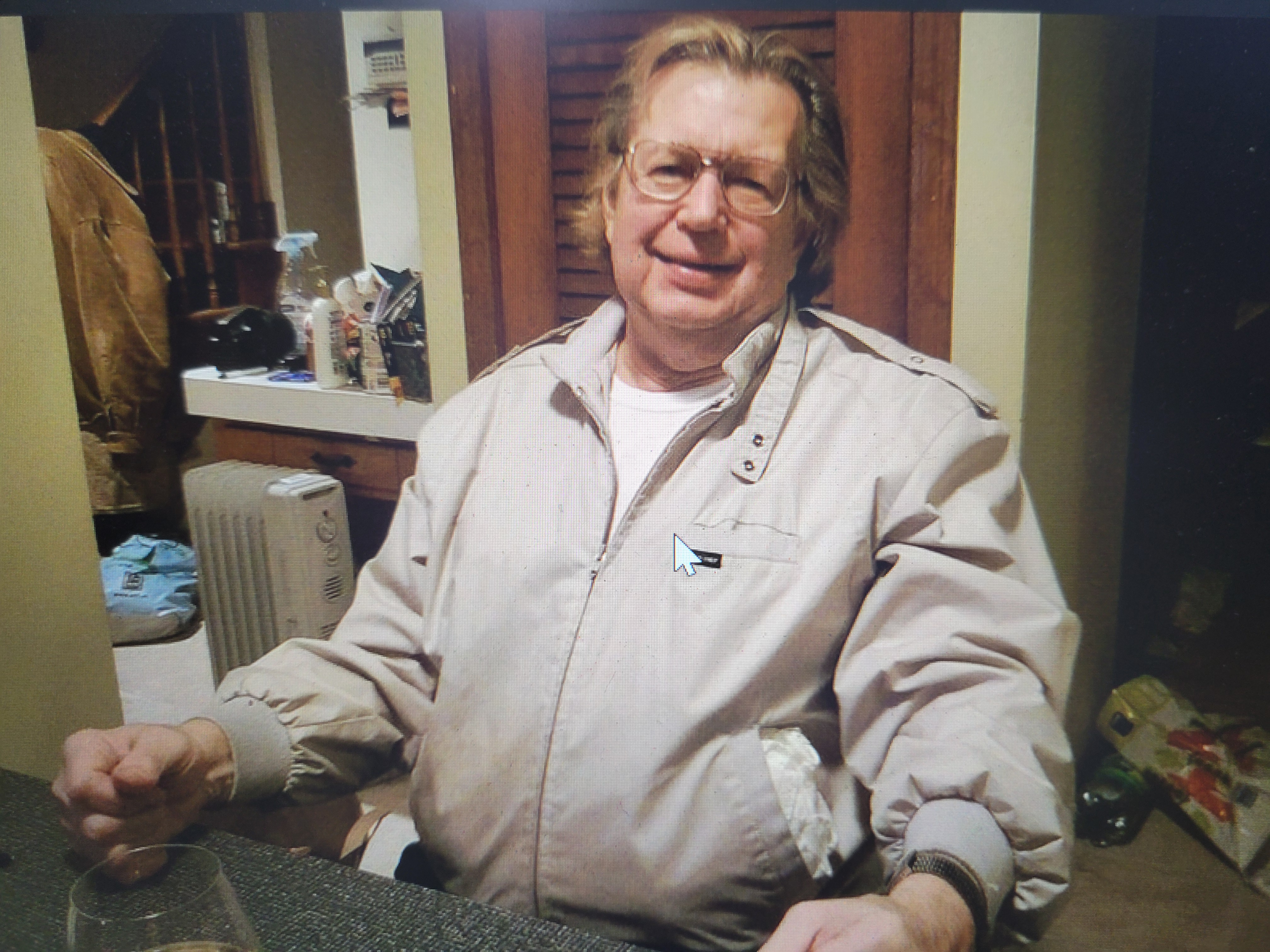
Member wearing a jacket.

== Revival ==
The brand was licensed in 2016 by Sammy Catton, President of iApparel Brands, LLC. Ron Malhotra currently owns the brand. In recent years, Members Only has added many styles of jackets, including a women's line, medical scrubs line and women, Footwear, Sportswear, and Hosiery.

== Cultural influence ==
Communication scholar Todd Kelshaw has interpreted the brand's popularity surge as part of a broader cultural shift in the early 1980s from participatory communities to increasingly wealthy materially-based communities represented in the purchase of consumer products. Members Only were known in the 1980s for their shift from celebrity endorsements as a form of advertisement to public service announcements regarding issues like anti-drugs and pro-voting.

Political journalist Matt Bai, in his book All The Truth Is Out: The Week Politics Went Tabloid, about former U.S. Senator Gary Hart's ill-fated 1988 presidential campaign, said that he had once referred to Hart as a dated figure from the 1980s, "the political version of a Members Only jacket."
