= ThighMaster =

Exercise product

The ThighMaster is an exercise product designed to shape one's thighs.

== Usage ==
The device is essentially two pieces of metal tube bent in a loop and connected with a hinge. The intended use is to put the ThighMaster between the knees and squeeze them together. This exercises the hip adductors. The simple mechanism allows exercising any suitable muscle where a small angle can be created to press it, for example the biceps (elbow flexion) or the hamstrings (knee flexion).

== Marketing ==
Advertisements emphasized that the ThighMaster could be used while doing something else. The infomercials featured people watching television and exercising with the ThighMaster at the same time. It was mainly advertised in the 1990s by the actress Suzanne Somers.

== History ==
The ThighMaster was invented in Sweden by then-physical medicine intern (later doctor) Anne Marie Bennstrom (Prescott) as the "V-Bar" physical therapy device. It later received US design patent number 343882S as "physical exerciser."

It achieved commercial success when marketed under the "ThighMaster" name by Joshua Reynolds (often erroneously credited as the inventor), who also made a great deal of money with his version of the Mood ring. Reynolds is an heir to the fortune of R. J. Reynolds, founder of R. J. Reynolds Tobacco Company.

"The V-Toner...we took over ownership of it and renamed it ThighMaster" — Suzanne Somers
