= I Love... =

British and American television and compilation album brand

- Genre: Documentary
- Countries of origin: United Kingdom (BBC); United States (VH1)
- Original language: English

Original release
- Network: BBC
- Release: 22 July 2000 – 3 November 2001
- Network: VH1
- Release: 16 December 2002 – 21 June 2014

I Love... is a British and American television and compilation album brand by the BBC and VH1, which looks back at a specific year in each episode. The programmes consist of celebrities and public figures discussing, reminiscing and commenting on the pop culture of the time i.e. films, fads, fashion, television, music, etc. that relate to the program's overall topic.

== BBC ==
BBC made three series:

- I Love...the 1970s premiered on 22 July 2000 in the UK, with the final part I Love 1979 premiering on 23 September 2000.
- I Love...the 1980s premiered on 13 January 2001 in the UK, with the final part I Love 1989 premiering on 24 March 2001.
- I Love...the 1990s premiered on 18 August 2001 in the UK, with the final part I Love 1999 premiering on 3 November 2001.

=== I Love Top of the Pops ===
In December 2001, BBC Two presented a night devoted to their Top of the Pops music chart programme under the name I Love Top of the Pops. The programme featured a documentary presented by Jamie Theakston called Top of the Pops: the True Story, a look at their 1970s dance troop in Pan's People: Digging the Dancing Queens and a version of Smashie and Nicey's TOTP Party originally broadcast on 4 January 1994.

== VH1 ==
VH1 produced a USA version of the I Love the... series for American television, beginning in 2002 with I Love the '80s. The programs consist of celebrities discussing American pop culture that relate to the program's overall topic. The series continued with programs focusing on decades, such as I Love the '70s and I Love the '90s, as well as doing sequels to previously done decades, such as I Love the '80s Strikes Back, I Love the '90s: Part Deux, I Love the '80s 3-D and I Love the '70s: Volume 2. 2008 featured the premiere of I Love the New Millennium, the series to be completed before the end of the decade presented, and 2014 ended the I Love the... series with the premiere of I Love the 2000s, the series to be completed after the end of the decade presented. The series has so far released two programs that were not focused on decades, with I Love Toys and I Love the Holidays. The use of the word "love" instead of the heart symbol was presumably to avoid a trademark dispute with the state of New York, owners of the ILove trademark in the United States.

On 20 February 2010 VH1 aired six hours' worth of the "best of" specials for the Best of I Love the... series: Best of I Love the '70s, Best of I Love the '80s and Best of I Love the '90s. However, these episodes only featured clips that were easy to license. Music that had been used in the clips in the previous I Love... series were replaced with generic tracks.

To deliver funny and memorable moments on the spot, the guests gradually switched from best-known celebrities to lesser-known people with comedic backgrounds; this latter group rose in popularity as the shows are centered more on the subjects than the guests.

- I Love the '80s (2002)
- I Love the '70s (2003)
- I Love the '80s Strikes Back (2003)
- I Love the '90s (2004)
- I Love the '90s: Part Deux (2005)
- I Love the '80s 3-D (2005)
- I Love the Holidays (2005)
- I Love Toys (2006)
- I Love the '70s: Volume 2 (2006)
- I Love the New Millennium (2008)
- Best of I Love the... (2010)
- I Love the 2000s (2014)

== Compilation albums ==
A number of I Love... tie-in albums were produced and released by EMI/Virgin.

- I Love 70s
- I Love 80s
- I Love Ibiza
- I Love 90s
- I Love 2 Party
- I Love Summer
- I Love 2 Party 2003
- I Love U
- I Love Christmas

A number of VH1's I Love the... tie-in albums were produced and released by Rhino Records.

- VH1: I Love the '70s
- VH1: I Love the '80s
- VH1: I Love the '90s

== Best Year Ever… (More4) ==
In 2022, ITN Productions produced a version of the I Love.. format under the name Best Year Ever… for More4. Like their version of The Rock 'n' Roll Years format for Channel 5, That's so..., ITV did not produce an episode for every year, picking one year from each decade between 1970 and 2000. The programme featured clips from ITN's archive plus interviews with Gyles Brandreth, Jenny Eclair, John Thomson, Stuart Maconie, Terry Christian and Robert Elms.

=== Episodes ===
- Best Year Ever: 1978
- Best Year Ever: 1982
- Best Year Ever: 1994
- Best Year Ever: 2000
