= Deaths in August 2001 =

The following is a list of notable deaths in August 2001.

Entries for each day are listed alphabetically by surname. A typical entry lists information in the following sequence:

- Name, age, country of citizenship at birth, subsequent country of citizenship (if applicable), reason for notability, cause of death (if known), and reference.

== August 2001 ==
=== 1 ===
- Zuzana Chalupová, 76, Serbian/Yugoslavian naïve painter.
- Jay Chamberlain, 75, American racing driver.
- Dwight Eddleman, 78, American basketball player (Tri-Cities Blackhawks/Milwaukee Hawks, Fort Wayne Pistons), and Olympic athlete (1948), heart ailment.
- Joe Lynch, 75, Irish actor.
- Adalbert Pall, 83, Romanian footballer.
- Begum Aizaz Rasul, 92, Indian politician.
- Robert Rimmer, 84, American writer.
- Korey Stringer, 27, American football player (Ohio State, Minnesota Vikings), complications following a heat stroke.
- Karol Szenajch, 94, Polish Olympic ice hockey player (1928).
- Dan Towler, 73, American gridiron football player (Los Angeles Rams).
- Nicolae Tătaru, 69, Romanian football player.
- Charlie Ward, 89, English golfer.

=== 2 ===
- Mario Alesini, 69, Italian Olympic basketball player (1960).
- Valerie Davies, 89, British Olympic swimmer, bronze medalist (1932).
- Edward Gardner, 89, British politician.
- Lawrence Minard, 51, American journalist and editor, heart attack.
- Robert Smith, 72, Canadian Olympic canoeist (1956).
- Ronald Townson, 68, American vocalist (The 5th Dimension), kidney failure.

=== 3 ===
- Franz-Josef Bach, 84, German politician and member of the Bundestag.
- Louis Chevalier, 90, French historian and academic.
- Christopher Hewett, 80, British actor (Mr. Belvedere, The Producers, Fantasy Island), diabetes.
- Hans Holt, 91, Austrian film actor.
- Frank Pakenham, 7th Earl of Longford, 95, British politician and social reformer.
- Jeanne Loriod, 73, French musician, drowned.
- Mario Perazzolo, 90, Italian footballer.
- Eduardo Toba, 78, Spanish football manager.
- Lars Johan Werle, 75, Swedish composer.

=== 4 ===
- S. K. Bhatnagar, 71, Indian politician and diplomat.
- Claude Bloodgood, 64, American chess player and convicted murderer, cancer.
- Sir Paterson Fraser, 94, British air marshal.
- Jack Maple, 48, American police officer and author, cancer.
- Lorenzo Music, 64, American voice actor (Garfield and Friends, The Real Ghostbusters) and television producer (The Bob Newhart Show), lung and bone cancer.
- Joyce Racek, 62, American Olympic gymnast (1956).
- Dan Zehr, 85, American Olympic swimmer (1932).

=== 5 ===
- Otema Allimadi, 72, Ugandan Foreign Minister (1979–1980) and Prime Minister of Uganda (1980–1985).
- Iskra Babich, 69, Soviet film director and screenwriter, cancer.
- Mykhailo Bilyi, 78, Soviet and Ukrainian politician.
- Miloš Bojović, 63, Serbian basketball player, sports journalist, and politician.
- Caro Crawford Brown, 93, American journalist and Pulitzer Prize winner.
- Roy Dikeman Chapin, Jr., 85, American business executive (Chairman and Chief Executive Officer of American Motors Corporation).
- Aaron Flahavan, 25, English football goalkeeper, car accident.
- Bahne Rabe, 37, German rower and Olympic champion, (1988, 1992), anorexia nervosa.
- Christopher Skase, 52, Australian businessman and fraudster, stomach cancer.

=== 6 ===
- Larry Adler, 87, American harmonica player, pneumonia.
- Jorge Amado, 88, Brazilian writer, heart attack.
- Wina Born, 80, Dutch journalist and cooking books author.
- Adhar Kumar Chatterji, 86, Indian navy admiral.
- Robert Dunham, 70, American actor, writer, and racecar driver.
- Vasili Kuznetsov, 69, Russian decathlete and Olympian (1956, 1960, 1964).
- Kenneth MacDonald, 50, English actor, heart attack.
- Jim Mallory, 82, American baseball player (Washington Senators, St. Louis Cardinals, New York Giants), and football coach.
- Duong Van Minh, 85, South Vietnamese politician and ARVN general.
- Wilhelm Mohnke, 90, German SS general during World War II.
- Ian Ousby, 54, British historian, author and editor, cancer.
- Alan Rafkin, 73, American film and television director (One Day at a Time, Coach, The Shakiest Gun in the West).
- Nils Svärd, 93, Swedish cross-country skier and Olympian (1932).
- Dorothy Tutin, 71, British actress (The Importance of Being Earnest, The Beggar's Opera, A Tale of Two Cities, The Shooting Party), leukemia.

=== 7 ===
- Roger Andewelt, 55, American judge.
- Paul Averitt, 78, American soldier and Holocaust photographer.
- Dan Edwards, 75, American gridiron football player (1948–1957) and coach (1958–1961).
- Jack James, 80, American rocket engineer.
- Algirdas Lauritėnas, 68, Soviet Lithuanian basketball player and Olympian (1956).
- José Tomás, 66, Spanish classical guitarist and teacher.

=== 8 ===
- Jean Dorst, 77, French ornithologist, former director of the National Museum of Natural History in Paris.
- Harry Julian Fink, 78, American television and film writer.
- Jean-Louis Flandrin, 70, French historian.
- George Mann, 83, English cricket player.
- Maureen Reagan, 60, American political activist and daughter of Ronald Reagan, melanoma.
- Nora Sayre, 68, American film critic and essayist.
- Peter Sinclair, 62, New Zealand radio personality.
- Paul Vaessen, 39, English footballer, accidental drug overdose.
- Noud van Melis, 77, Dutch football player and Olympian (1952).
- Patrick D. Wall, 76, British neuroscientist.

=== 9 ===
- Abe Bonnema, 74, Dutch architect.
- Humphry Bowen, 72, British botanist and chemist.
- Jacky Boxberger, 52, French athlete and Olympian (1968, 1972, 1976, 1984), killed by an elephant.
- L. G. Dupree, 68, American gridiron football player (Baltimore Colts, Dallas Cowboys), cancer.
- Elmer Knutson, 86, Canadian businessman, activist and politician.
- Alec Skempton, 87, British scientist.

=== 10 ===
- Lou Boudreau, 84, American baseball player (Cleveland Indians, Boston Red Sox), and manager, seven-time All-Star and a member of the Baseball Hall of Fame.
- Vladimir Bougrine, 63, Russian painter.
- Álvaro Carolino, 50, Portuguese football player and manager, pulmonary complications.
- Elsa Cavelti, 94, Swiss operatic contralto and mezzo-soprano.
- Jerry DeFuccio, 76, American comic book writer and editor.
- Manfred Eglin, 65, German footballer and Olympian (1956).
- Vasudeo S. Gaitonde, Indian painter.
- Gianfranco Miglio, 83, Italian jurist, political scientist and politician.
- Ramón Monzant, 68, Venezuelan baseball player (New York/San Francisco Giants).
- Dietrich Peltz, 87, German Luftwaffe bomber and Wehrmacht general during World War II.
- Werner Pirchner, 61, Austrian composer and jazz musician.
- Louis Purnell, 81, American curator at the National Air and Space Museum.
- Stanislav Rostotsky, 79, Soviet/Russian film director and screenwriter.
- Turkey Tolson Tjupurrula, 63, Australian Indigenous artist.

=== 11 ===
- Eliahu Amiel, 76, Israeli Olympic basketball player (1952).
- Paul Cunniffe, 40, British-Irish singer-songwriter, fall from balcony.
- Ángel Famiglietti, 73, Panamanian Olympic weightlifter (1960).
- Carlos Hank González, 73, Mexican politician and businessman.
- Edward Thomas Hall, 77, British scientist, known for exposing the Piltdown Man as a fraud.
- Bob Harris, 57, American jazz pianist and arranger, drug overdose.
- Isidoro Malmierca, 70, Cuban politician, lung cancer.
- Percy Stallard, 92, British racing cyclist.
- Don Williams, 82, American football player (Pittsburgh Steelers).

=== 12 ===
- Irene Astor, Baroness Astor of Hever, 81, English noblewoman and philanthropist.
- Pierre Klossowski, 96, French writer, translator and artist.
- Julian Pitt-Rivers, 82, British social anthropologist and ethnographer.
- Walter Walker, 88, British army general.

=== 13 ===
- Manuel Alvar, 78, Spanish linguist, historian, and university professor.
- Joachim von Bethmann-Hollweg, 89, German ice hockey player and Olympian (1936).
- René Berthier, 89, French actor.
- Stephanus du Plessis, 71, South African Olympic discus thrower and shot putter (1956, 1960).
- John C. Elliott, 82, American politician and 39th Governor of American Samoa.
- Jim Hughes, 78, American baseball player (Brooklyn Dodgers,Chicago Cubs, Chicago White Sox).
- Jimmy Knapp, 60, British trades unionist, cancer.
- Gabor Peterdi, 85, Hungarian-American painter and printmaker.
- Miguel Rodriguez Rodriguez, 70, Puerto Rican Roman Catholic] bishop.
- Richard Shorr, 58, American sound engineer (Die Hard, Predator, Teenage Mutant Ninja Turtles).
- Alan Skene, 68, South African rugby player.
- Otto Stuppacher, 54, Austrian race car driver.
- Stan West, 88, British athlete and Olympian (1936).
- Antonio Zumel, 69, Filipino journalist, activist, and revolutionary.

=== 14 ===
- Earl Anthony, 63, American professional bowler, domestic accident.
- Oscar Janiger, 83, American experimental psychiatrist, known for his LSD research.
- Jackie 'Butch' Jenkins, 63, American child actor.
- Ridgway B. Knight, 90, American diplomat and ambassador.
- Pavel Schmidt, 71, Slovak rower and Olympian (1960).

=== 15 ===
- Richard Chelimo, 29, Kenyan Olympic long-distance runner (1992), brain cancer.
- Sheldon Datz, 74, American chemist.
- Raymond Edward Johnson, 90, American radio and stage actor (Inner Sanctum Mysteries).
- Peter Mazur, 78, Austrian-Dutch physicist.
- Renato Panciera, 66, Italian Olympic sprinter (1960).
- Jim Russell, 92, Australian cartoonist.
- Kateryna Yushchenko, 81, Ukrainian computer and information research scientist.
- Yavuz Çetin, 30, Turkish musician, suicide.

=== 16 ===
- Dave Barry, 82, American actor and comedian.
- Kenneth Reese Cole, Jr., 63, American political aide to Richard Nixon.
- Ruperto Donoso, 86, Chilean jockey.
- Fred Glover, 73, Canadian ice hockey player (Chicago Black Hawks, Detroit Red Wings, Cleveland Barons) and coach (Oakland Seals, Los Angeles Kings).
- Anna Mani, 82, Indian physicist and meteorologist, stroke.
- Sizwe Motaung, 31, South African football player, AIDS-related complications.
- James Rønvang, 76, Danish footballer.
- Floyd Spence, 73, American attorney and a politician, cerebral thrombosis.
- Sidney Tillim, 76, American artist and art critic.
- Klaus Wagner, 79, German equestrian and Olympic medalist (1952, 1956, 1960, 1968).

=== 17 ===
- William G. Clark, 77, American politician and jurist.
- Josef Fried, 87, Polish-American organic chemist.
- Herman Goffberg, 80, American Olympic long-distance runner (1948).
- Emil Gorovets, 78, Soviet and Ukrainian singer.
- Živko Nikolić, 59, Yugoslav and Montenegrin film director.
- Charles Palmer, 71, British martial artist.
- Flip Phillips, 86, American jazz tenor saxophone and clarinet player.

=== 18 ===
- Edmund Cambridge, 80, American actor and director, complications from a fall.
- Roland Cardon, 72, Belgian composer, music teacher, and multi-instrumentalist.
- Philip B. Crosby, 75, American businessman and author.
- Jack Elliott, 74, American film and television music composer (Charlie's Angels, Night Court, The Jerk).
- Hillel Kook, 86, Russian/American Revisionist Zionist activist and politician.
- David Peakall, 70, British environmental toxicologist and ornithologist.
- Toppur Seethapathy Sadasivan, 88, Indian plant pathologist.
- Tom Watson, 69, Scottish actor.

=== 19 ===
- Betty Everett, 61, American soul singer and pianist ("The Shoop Shoop Song", "Let It Be Me").
- Felicisimo Fajardo, 87, Filipino basketball player and Olympian (1948).
- Junichiro Itani, 75, Japanese anthropologist and academic.
- Dean Roper, 62, American stock car racer, heart attack.
- Les Sealey, 43, English footballer, heart attack.
- Inder Singh, 57, Indian Olympic hockey player (1968).
- Willy Vannitsen, 66, Belgian racing cyclist.
- Donald Woods, 67, South African journalist, newspaper editor, and anti-apartheid activist, cancer.

=== 20 ===
- Robert Cayman, 82, Belgian Olympic field hockey player (1948).
- Richard Cloward, 74, American sociologist and activist (National Voter Registration Act of 1993).
- Neal Colzie, 48, American gridiron football player (Oakland Raiders, Miami Dolphins, Tampa Bay Buccaneers), heart attack.
- Hazzard Dill, 82, Bermudian sprinter and Olympian (1948).
- Sir Fred Hoyle, 86, British astronomer and science fiction writer, stroke.
- Akın Kuloğlu, 29, Georgian-Turkish boxer and Olympian (1996, 2000), traffic collision.
- Walter Reed, 85, American stage, film and television actor.
- Sylvia Millecam, 45, Dutch actress and comedian, breast cancer.
- Kershasp Tehmurasp Satarawala, 85, Indian civil servant and diplomat.
- Eliezer Shostak, 89, Israeli politician.
- Kim Stanley, 76, American actress (Séance on a Wet Afternoon, The Right Stuff, Frances), Emmy winner (1963, 1985), uterine cancer.
- Rolla M. Tryon Jr., 84, American botanist.
- Frederik De Waele, 82, Belgian Olympic gymnast (1952).

=== 21 ===
- Beryl Cooke, 94, British actress.
- Pál Engel, 63, Hungarian historian.
- Steven Izenour, 61, American architect and author (Learning from Las Vegas).
- John Kerins, 39, Irish Gaelic footballer, cancer.
- Calum MacKay, 74, Canadian ice hockey player (Detroit Red Wings, Montreal Canadiens).
- Norman Rigby, 78, English footballer and manager.
- Juan Antonio Villacañas, 79, Spanish poet, essayist and critic.

=== 22 ===
- Johnny Anderson, 71, Scottish football player.
- Tatyana Averina, 51, Soviet Russian Olympic speed skater (1976, 1980), stomach cancer.
- Mauro Bicicli, 66, Italian football player and coach.
- Rose Edgcumbe, 67, British psychologist, psychoanalyst, and academic.
- Bernard Heuvelmans, 84, French scientist.
- Bobby Johnstone, 71, Scottish footballer (Hibernian, Manchester City, Oldham Athletic, Scotland).
- Tage Jönsson, 81, Swedish Olympic racewalker (1948).
- Spiro Koleka, 93, Albanian communist politician and statesman.
- Gita Luka, 79, Israeli actress, comedian and singer, stroke.
- Woody Pitzer, 90, American basketball player.
- Jean Séphériadès, 79, French rower and Olympian (1948).
- Sharad Talwalkar, 82, Indian actor, heart attack.
- Varro Eugene Tyler, 74, American professor of pharmacognosy and philatelist.

=== 23 ===
- Eric Allendale, 65, British jazz musician.
- Howard Fletcher, 88, American college football player and head coach (Northern Illinois University).
- Frank Emilio Flynn, 80, Cuban pianist.
- Ray Frederick, 72, Canadian ice hockey player (Chicago Black Hawks).
- Kathleen Freeman, 78, American actress (Wagon Train, North to Alaska, The Nutty Professor), lung cancer.
- Herbert Haag, 86, German-Swiss Roman Catholic theologian and biblical scholar (known for challenging the Vatican).
- Shirley Kleinhans, 72, American baseball player.
- Henriette Bie Lorentzen, 90, Norwegian journalist, peace activist, feminist, and publisher.
- Peter Maas, 72, American journalist and author (Serpico, The Valachi Papers).
- Fukukane Nikaidō, 78, Japanese economist.
- Manolita Saval, 87, Spanish actress and singer, thrombosis.
- Pedro Simão, 86, Brazilian Olympic sports shooter (1948, 1952, 1956).

=== 24 ===
- George Benson, 82, American gridiron football player (Brooklyn Dodgers).
- Jane Greer, 76, American film and television actress (Out of the Past), cancer.
- Milan Kadlec, 42, Czech Olympic pentathlete (1980, 1988), suicide by hanging.
- Lavina Keough, 74, American baseball player.
- Roman Matsov, 84, Soviet and Estonian violinist, pianist, and conductor.
- Hank Sauer, 84, American baseball player (1952 Most Valuable Player) ("The Mayor of Wrigley Field").
- Raymond Wilding-White, 78, American composer.

=== 25 ===
- Aaliyah, 22, American alternative R&B singer (Are You That Somebody?, Try Again) and actress (Romeo Must Die, Queen of the Damned), plane crash.
- Madge Adam, 89, English astronomer.
- Mary Barnard, 91, American poet, biographer and translator.
- Carl Brewer, 62, Canadian ice hockey player (Toronto Maple Leafs, Detroit Red Wings, St. Louis Blues).
- John Chambers, 78, American make-up artist and first civilian to receive the Intelligence Medal of Merit.
- Üzeyir Garih, 72, Turkish engineer, businessman, writer and investor.
- Diana Golden, 38, American disabled ski racer, cancer.
- Philippe Léotard, 60, French actor and singer, respiratory failure.
- Ginzō Matsuo, 50, Japanese voice actor, subarachnoid hemorrhage.
- John L. Nelson, 85, American jazz musician, songwriter and father of Prince.
- Asit Sen, 78, Bengali Indian film director, cinematographer and screenwriter.
- Ken Tyrrell, 75, British motor racing driver and team leader, pancreatic cancer.

=== 26 ===
- John Horn, 69, British tennis player.
- Louis Muhlstock, 97, Canadian painter.
- Horymír Netuka, 71, Slovak Olympic boxer (1952).
- Marita Petersen, 60, Prime Minister of the Faroe Islands and first female speaker of the House, cancer.
- Al Pittman, 61, Canadian poet and playwright.

=== 27 ===
- Cal Collins, 68, American jazz guitarist.
- Michalis Dertouzos, 64, Greek-American professor and computer scientist.
- John Joe Landers, 94, Irish Gaelic footballer.
- James D. Ford, 70, American clergyman, Chaplain of the United States House of Representatives (1979-2000), suicide by gunshot.
- Ludovico Kempter, 87, Argentine Olympic sailor (1952).
- Herman Kunnen, 76, Belgian Olympic sprinter (1948).
- Abu Ali Mustafa, 63, Palestinian leader and Secretary General of the Popular Front for the Liberation of Palestine (PFLP), airstrike.
- Juan Lechín Oquendo, 87, Bolivian politician, Vice President (1960–1964).
- Karl Ulrich Schnabel, 92, Austrian pianist.

=== 28 ===
- Bert Gardiner, 88, Canadian ice hockey player (Montreal Canadiens, Chicago Black Hawks, Boston Bruins, New York Rangers).
- Käthe Grasegger, 84, German Olympic alpine skier (1936).
- David P. Harmon, 82, American scenarist and producer.
- Johan Frederik Holleman, 85, Dutch-South African ethnologist and legal scholar.
- Kenneth Maddocks, 94, British colonial official and Governor of Fiji (1958-1963).
- Lawrence B. Marcus, 84, American screenwriter.
- Mervyn McKinnon, 70, New Zealand Olympic field hockey player (1960).
- Juan Muñoz, 48, Spanish sculptor, cardiac arrest caused by an aneurysm.
- Serhiy Perkhun, 23, Ukrainian footballer, cerebral hemorrhage.
- Remy Presas, 64, Filipino martial artist and founder of Modern Arnis, brain cancer.
- Ernst Stettler, 80, Swiss racing cyclist.

=== 29 ===
- Harold Chestnut, 83, American electrical engineer at General Electric and author.
- Roger Daley, 58, British meteorologist.
- Victor Jörgensen, 77, Danish Olympic boxer (1952).
- Manubhai Pancholi, 86, Indian novelist, author, and politician.
- Sid Peterson, 83, American baseball player (St. Louis Browns).
- Francisco Rabal, 75, Spanish actor, pulmonary emphysema.
- Dick Selma, 57, American baseball player, liver cancer.
- Graeme Strachan, 49, Australian singer (Skyhooks) and television presenter.
- Eric Tipton, 86, American baseball player (Philadelphia Athletics, Cincinnati Reds).
- Sabahattin Özbek, 86, Turkish politician and academic.

=== 30 ===
- Juan Acuña, 78, Spanish football goalkeeper.
- Julie Bishop, 87, American actress (Sands of Iwo Jima, Princess O'Rourke, Northern Pursuit, The High and the Mighty), pneumonia.
- A. F. M. Ahsanuddin Chowdhury, 86, 9th President of Bangladesh.
- Stan Harland, 61, English football player.
- Govan Mbeki, 91, South African politician, leader of the ANC and SACP.
- G. K. Moopanar, 70, Indian politician.
- Dilli Raman Regmi, 87, Nepali historian and politician.
- Kothamangalam Seenu, 91, Indian actor and singer.
- Kwee Kiat Sek, 67, Indonesian football player and Olympian (1956).
- Agus Wirahadikusumah, 49, Indonesian military officer.

=== 31 ===
- Crash Davis, 82, American baseball player, stomach cancer (Philadelphia Athletics).
- Julio Antonio Elícegui, 90, Spanish football player.
- Paul Hamlyn, 75, British publisher and philanthropist.
- Odd Steinar Holøs, 79, Norwegian politician.
- Melcher Risberg, 71, Swedish Olympic cross-country skier (1964, 1968).
