= 2001 in the United Kingdom =

Events from the year 2001 in the United Kingdom. The year was dominated by the foot-and-mouth crisis.

== Incumbents ==
- Monarch – Elizabeth II
- Prime Minister – Tony Blair (Labour)

== Events ==
=== January ===
- 5 January – A report by the Department of Health suggests that Dr Harold Shipman, convicted of 15 murders a year ago, may have killed more than 300 patients since the 1970s.
- 8 January
  - The High Court rules that the identities and whereabouts of the two killers of James Bulger are to be kept secret for the rest of their lives. Robert Thompson and Jon Venables, both now aged 18, are expected to be released from custody later this year.
  - Sexual Offences (Amendment) Act 2000 comes into effect, reducing the age of consent for male homosexual sexual acts to that for heterosexual and lesbian acts, sixteen (seventeen in Northern Ireland).
- 9 January – Sven-Göran Eriksson begins his job as manager of the England football team six months ahead of schedule, having resigned from his previous job as Lazio manager. He had signed a five-year contract with The Football Association on 30 October 2000 to succeed Kevin Keegan.
- 12 January – Marie Therese Kouao and Carl Manning are sentenced to life imprisonment for the murder of Kouao's niece Victoria Climbié, who died in 2000 after suffering horrific abuse and neglect at the hands of the couple in their London home. Victoria (aged eight) had been living with the pair since her parents sent her to England to receive a good education.
- 24 January – Secretary of State for Northern Ireland Peter Mandelson resigns from the cabinet for the second time.
- 25 January – After briefly slipping behind the Conservatives in an opinion poll four months ago, Labour are looking all set for victory in the forthcoming general election as they score 49% in the latest MORI poll and open up a 20-point lead over their rivals.
- 31 January – The Scottish Court in the Netherlands convicts a Libyan and acquits another for their part in the bombing of Pan Am Flight 103 which crashed in Lockerbie in 1988. Al Amin Khalifah Fhimah (aged 44) is cleared, but Abdelbaset Ali Mohamed Al Megrahi is found guilty and sentenced to life imprisonment with a recommended minimum term of 20 years.

=== February ===
- 19 February – Foot and mouth crisis begins.
- 21 February – A bomb disguised as a hand-held torch explodes outside a Territorial Army barracks in Shepherd's Bush, seriously injuring a 14-year-old cadet who picked it up.
- 25 February – Liverpool beat Birmingham City on penalties after a 1–1 draw in the Football League Cup final – the first cup final to be played at Millennium Stadium, Cardiff, since Wembley closed for redevelopment.
- 28 February – A rail crash near Selby kills 10 people.

=== March ===
- 4 March – A car bomb explodes outside the BBC's main news centre at White City, west London, seriously injuring a London Underground worker. The Real IRA are suspected of being behind the attack.
- 8 March – The wreckage of Donald Campbell's speedboat Bluebird K7 is raised from the bottom of Coniston Water in Cumbria, 34 years after Campbell was killed in an attempt to break the world water speed record.
- 15 March – Donald Campbell's body is recovered from Lake Coniston, 34 years after he died in an attempt to break the land water speed record.
- 17 March – Eden Project opens to the public near St Austell, Cornwall; conceived by Tim Smit with design by Nicholas Grimshaw & Partners.
- 18 March – Claire Marsh (aged 18) becomes the youngest woman in Britain to be convicted of rape after pinning down a woman who was raped by a pair of teenagers in west London. She is sentenced to seven years in prison, while her accomplices (aged 15 and 18) are jailed for five years.
- 31 March – Stuart Lubbock, a meat-factory worker from Harlow in Essex, dies under suspicious circumstances at the home of television presenter Michael Barrymore.

=== April ===
- 5 April – Perry Wacker, a Dutch lorry driver, is jailed for 14 years for the manslaughter of 58 Chinese illegal immigrants who were found suffocated in his lorry at Dover ferry port in June last year.
- 15 April – Manchester United win the FA Premier League title for the third season in succession, and the seventh time in nine seasons.
- 23 April
  - Jane Andrews, a former personal assistant to Sarah, Duchess of York, goes on trial accused of murdering her fiancé Thomas Cressman.
  - Manchester United pay a British record fee of £19million for Ruud van Nistelrooy, the 24-year-old PSV Eindhoven and Netherlands national football team striker who had been due to join the club last year until the transfer was put on hold by injury.
- 29 April – Census of population in the United Kingdom.

=== May ===
- 1 May – An anti-capitalist demonstration in London, part of worldwide protests, turns violent.
- 4 May – The government relaxes its sanctions designed to tackle the foot and mouth crisis after more than two months.
- 11 May – House of Commons (Removal of Clergy Disqualification) Act 2001 removes disqualifications for clergy in standing for election as members of parliament and other elected bodies.
- 12 May – Liverpool win the FA Cup Final when two Michael Owen goals in the final minutes of the game give them a 2–1 win over Arsenal in the final at the Millennium Stadium.
- 13 May – The family of Mahmood Mattan, hanged in 1952 following his wrongful conviction for the murder of Lily Volpert, are awarded £1.4m in compensation by the Home Office, the first time the family of someone wrongfully hanged in the UK have received compensation.
- 15 May – Medication prices fall as a result of a court ruling which puts an end to the drug industry's price-fixing policies.
- 16 May
  - Deputy Prime Minister John Prescott punches a protester who threw an egg at him in Rhyl.
  - Jane Andrews is sentenced to life imprisonment after being found guilty of murdering Thomas Cressman.
  - Liverpool win the UEFA Cup – their first European trophy for 17 years – with a 5–4 win over Spanish side Deportivo Alavés.
- 23 May – The first C-17 Globemaster III to serve with the Royal Air Force arrives in the UK at RAF Brize Norton in Oxfordshire
- 24 May – At Bristol Crown Court, Lee Ford is sentenced to five terms of life imprisonment after pleading guilty to the murders of his wife and four stepchildren at their home in Carnkie, near Redruth, Cornwall, in September 2000.

=== June ===
- 1 June – Official opening of Cardiff Bay Barrage.
- 7 June – General Election: Labour Party attains a second successive landslide election victory. Among the new entrants to parliament is 34-year-old future Conservative prime minister David Cameron, who retains the Witney seat in Oxfordshire for the Conservative Party. Amongst the retiring members is Edward Heath, the former Conservative prime minister, who at the age of eighty-four, was the oldest member of the last parliament and also its longest-serving continuous member having served since the 1950 election. This is the first election to have been held under the regulation of the Political Parties, Elections and Referendums Act 2000. Voter turnout at 59.4% is the lowest since the introduction of universal suffrage.
- 8 June – William Hague announces his resignation as Conservative Party leader after four years.
- 17 June – Cardinal Winning, head of the Roman Catholic church in Scotland, dies of a heart attack aged seventy-six in Glasgow.
- 22 June – Home Secretary David Blunkett announces that Robert Thompson and Jon Venables, convicted at the age of eleven of murdering toddler James Bulger on Merseyside, are to be released on life licence later this year after the Parole board recommended their release after eight years in custody.
- 25 June – A race riot breaks out in Burnley, with more than 200 White and Asian youths being involved in brawling, vandalism and arson.
- 29 June – The government announces plans to build a £3,000,000 fountain in memory of Diana, Princess of Wales at Hyde Park, London.

=== July ===
- July – MG Rover launches a new range of MG-badged performance variants of its Rover family cars.
- 2 July – Barry George is sentenced to life imprisonment for the murder of the television presenter Jill Dando, who was killed in Fulham, London, on 26 April 1999. George is acquitted at a retrial in 2008.
- 7 July – Race riots in Bradford, West Yorkshire. The riots begin after National Front members reportedly stab an Asian man outside a pub.
- 12 July – The British transfer record is broken for the third time in eight months when Manchester United pay Italian club Lazio £28.1million for Argentine midfielder Juan Sebastián Verón.
- 16 July – The Labour government suffers its first parliamentary defeat over the sacking of Gwyneth Dunwoody and Donald Anderson as chairs of select committees on transport and foreign affairs.
- 18 July – Philip John Smith is sentenced to life imprisonment after pleading guilty to the murders of three women in Birmingham in November last year.
- 19 July – Politician and novelist Jeffrey Archer is sentenced to four years in prison for perjury and perverting the course of justice.
- 20 July – Rioting breaks out in Brixton, London, following the fatal shooting of Derek Bennett, a 29-year-old black man, by armed police in the area. 27 people are arrested and three police officers are injured.
- 29 July – A victim support group condemns a reported £11,000 payout by the Criminal Injuries Compensation Authority to the parents of murdered Sarah Payne as "derisory".

=== August ===
- 3 August – A car bomb explodes in Uxbridge Road, near Ealing Broadway railway station, injuring seven people.
- 4 August – Oxford United move into their new 12,500-seat Kassam Stadium near the city's Blackbird Leys estate. Work on the stadium had started in 1996 but halted the following year due to the club's financial problems. The stadium will initially have three stands but a fourth stand could be built in the future to take the capacity to 15,000.
- 7 August – The government takes an unprecedented step with the £27 million nationalisation of a private hospital near Harley Street in London.
- 10 August – Former Conservative Party MP Neil Hamilton and his wife Christine are arrested on suspicion of sexual assault.
- 11 August – Southampton F.C. move into their new 32,000-seat St Mary's Stadium.
- 16 August – Former royal butler Paul Burrell is charged with the theft of items belonging to the late Diana, Princess of Wales; the prosecution subsequently collapses.
- 28 August – Police officer Karl Bluestone murders his wife and two children at their home in Gravesend, Kent.
- 31 August – Neil and Christine Hamilton are cleared in connection with the sexual assault allegations.

=== September ===
- 3 September – In Belfast, Protestant loyalists begin a picket of Holy Cross, a Catholic primary school for girls. For the next 11 weeks, riot police escort the schoolchildren and their parents through hundreds of protesters, amid rioting and heightened violence.
- 5 September – Peter Bray completes the first crossing of the Atlantic Ocean in a kayak.
- 7 September – One million children in over 3,000 schools participate in an experiment to discover if it is possible to create earthquakes by all jumping off chairs.
- 10 September
  - Charles Ingram wins £1 million on the television game show Who Wants to Be a Millionaire?, but the prize is cancelled after he is accused of cheating.
  - The Bank of Scotland and the Halifax merge to form HBOS plc.
- 11 September
  - September 11 attacks: by al-Qaeda terrorists upon the United States. 67 UK nationals perish in the attacks, the largest loss of life from any nation other than the U.S. itself.
  - One Canada Square, the UK's second tallest building, and the London Stock Exchange are evacuated following the attacks in the United States.
  - Prime Minister Tony Blair cancels a speech he was due to give to the TUC, and pledges to "stand shoulder to shoulder" with the United States.
- 12 September – The funeral of Donald Campbell takes place at Coniston in Cumbria, 34 years after his death.
- 13 September
  - The Queen orders the Changing of the Guard ceremony to be paused for a two-minute silence, followed by the playing of the American national anthem, in tribute to the victims of the terrorist attacks two days earlier.
  - British politician William Hague resigns as Leader of the Opposition and Leader of the Conservative Party. Iain Duncan Smith becomes leader of the Conservative Party after winning the leadership election.
- 14 September – National memorial service held at St Paul's Cathedral for the victims of the 11 September terrorist attacks.
- 17 September – Gateshead Millennium Bridge opens to the public.
- 21 September – Increased racial tensions in Peterborough, England, following the September 11 attacks result in the murder of Ross Parker by a gang of ten Muslims in a racially motivated attack.

=== October ===
- 6 October – The England national football team achieves automatic qualification for next summer's World Cup in Japan and South Korea with a 2–2 draw against Greece at Old Trafford, thanks to an injury-time equaliser by captain David Beckham.
- 7 October – United States armed-forces invade Afghanistan. Submarines of the British Royal Navy participate using Tomahawk cruise missiles.
- 12 October – The long-serving politician and barrister Quintin Hogg dies aged 94 at his home in Putney Heath, London.
- 23 October – The Provisional Irish Republican Army announces that it has begun to decommission its weapons.
- 25 October – The British Crime Survey reveals that crime rates are at their lowest levels since 1981.

=== November ===
- 3 November – A car bomb explodes in Birmingham near New Street railway station. No-one is injured, and it is believed that only the device's detonator exploded.
- 4 November – The Police Service of Northern Ireland is established, as successor to the Royal Ulster Constabulary.
- 9 November – The film Harry Potter and the Philosopher's Stone is premiered in London.
- 12 November – Greek authorities hold 12 British plane-spotters on charges of spying.
- 22 November
  - At the Ipswich by-election, the Labour Party candidate Chris Mole holds the seat.
  - The Labour government's upturn in popularity continues as the latest MORI poll puts them 31 points ahead of the Conservatives on 56%.
- 24 November – The 2001 Kangaroo tour concludes with the Australia national rugby league team defeating Great Britain in the 3rd and deciding test match of the Ashes series.
- 29 November – Ex-Beatle George Harrison dies aged 58 of lung cancer at a house belonging to Paul McCartney in Beverley Hills, California.

=== December ===
- December – The third-generation Nissan Primera P12 goes into production with Nissan Motor Manufacturing UK.
- 10 December
  - V. S. Naipaul wins the Nobel Prize in Literature "for having united perceptive narrative and incorruptible scrutiny in works that compel us to see the presence of suppressed histories".
  - Timothy Hunt and Paul Nurse win the Nobel Prize in Physiology or Medicine jointly with Leland H. Hartwell "for their discoveries of key regulators of the cell cycle".
- 11 December – The Post Office announces that up to 30,000 postal workers could be made redundant over the next 18 months as part of a £1.2billion cost-cutting package.
- 12 December – Roy Whiting is found guilty at Lewes Crown Court of the murder of Sarah Payne, an 8-year-old who was found dead near Pulborough, West Sussex, in July last year. It is then revealed that Whiting already had a conviction for abducting and molesting a girl of the same age in 1995. The trial judge sentences Whiting, a 42-year-old former mechanic, to life imprisonment and says that it is a rare case in which he would recommend to the appropriate authorities that life should mean life. It is only the 24th time that such a recommendation has been made in British legal history.
- 13 December – Lynette Lithgow, 51-year-old former BBC newsreader, is found murdered with her mother and brother at the family home in Trinidad.
- 21 December – The Metropolitan Police storm a cargo ship in the English Channel fearing that it might contain terrorist material.
- 22 December – British-born terrorist Richard Reid attempts to blow up American Airlines Flight 63 from Charles de Gaulle Airport in Paris to Miami International Airport, using explosives hidden in his shoes.
- 25 December – The Queen's last surviving aunt, Princess Alice, Duchess of Gloucester, celebrates her hundredth birthday.

=== Undated ===
- Conservatoire for Dance and Drama, a national higher education institution, is established, the founding affiliates being the Royal Academy of Dramatic Art and the London Contemporary Dance School.
- The red-billed chough recolonises Cornwall after an absence of 50 years.
- First osprey breed in England in recent times.
- The proportion of people living in owner-occupied homes in England reaches an all-time peak of 72.5%.
- A record of nearly 2.5 million new cars are sold in Britain this year, with the Ford Focus being Britain's best selling car for the third year in a row. Vauxhall maintains its second place behind Ford for sales, while Citroën, Peugeot, Renault and Volkswagen also enjoy strong sales. MG Rover sales, however, fall below 100,000.

== Publications ==
- 29 October – Roger Hargreaves' children's book Mr. Cheeky celebrates the 30th anniversary of the Mr. Men series.
- Ian McEwan's novel Atonement.
- Terry Pratchett's Discworld novels Thief of Time, The Last Hero and The Amazing Maurice and his Educated Rodents. The Amazing Maurice and his Educated Rodents wins the Carnegie Medal.

== Births ==
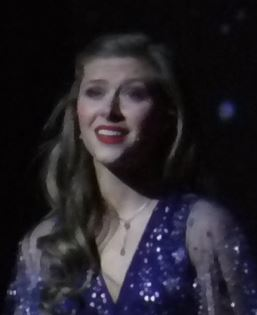
Lily Laight

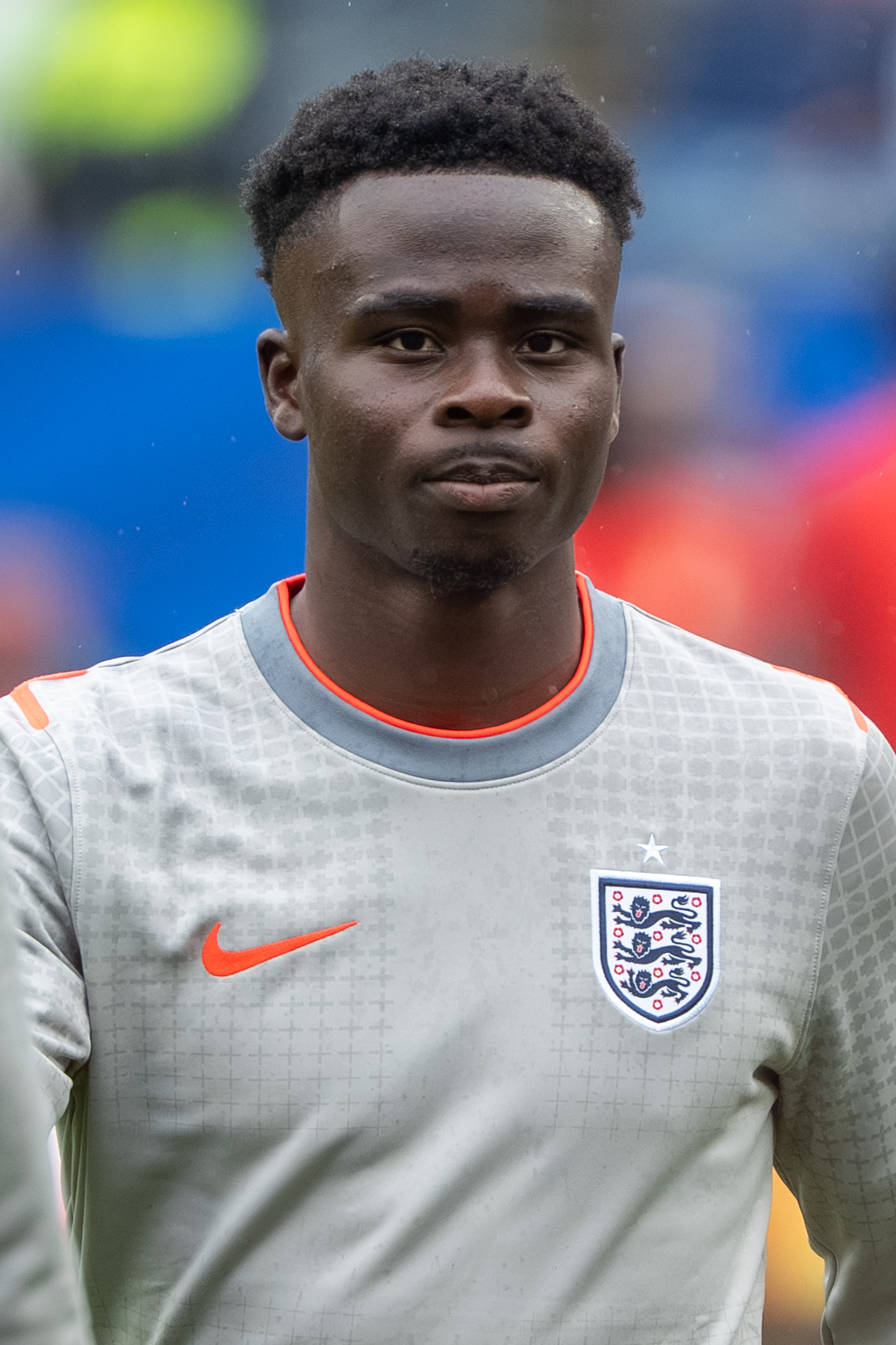
Bukayo Saka

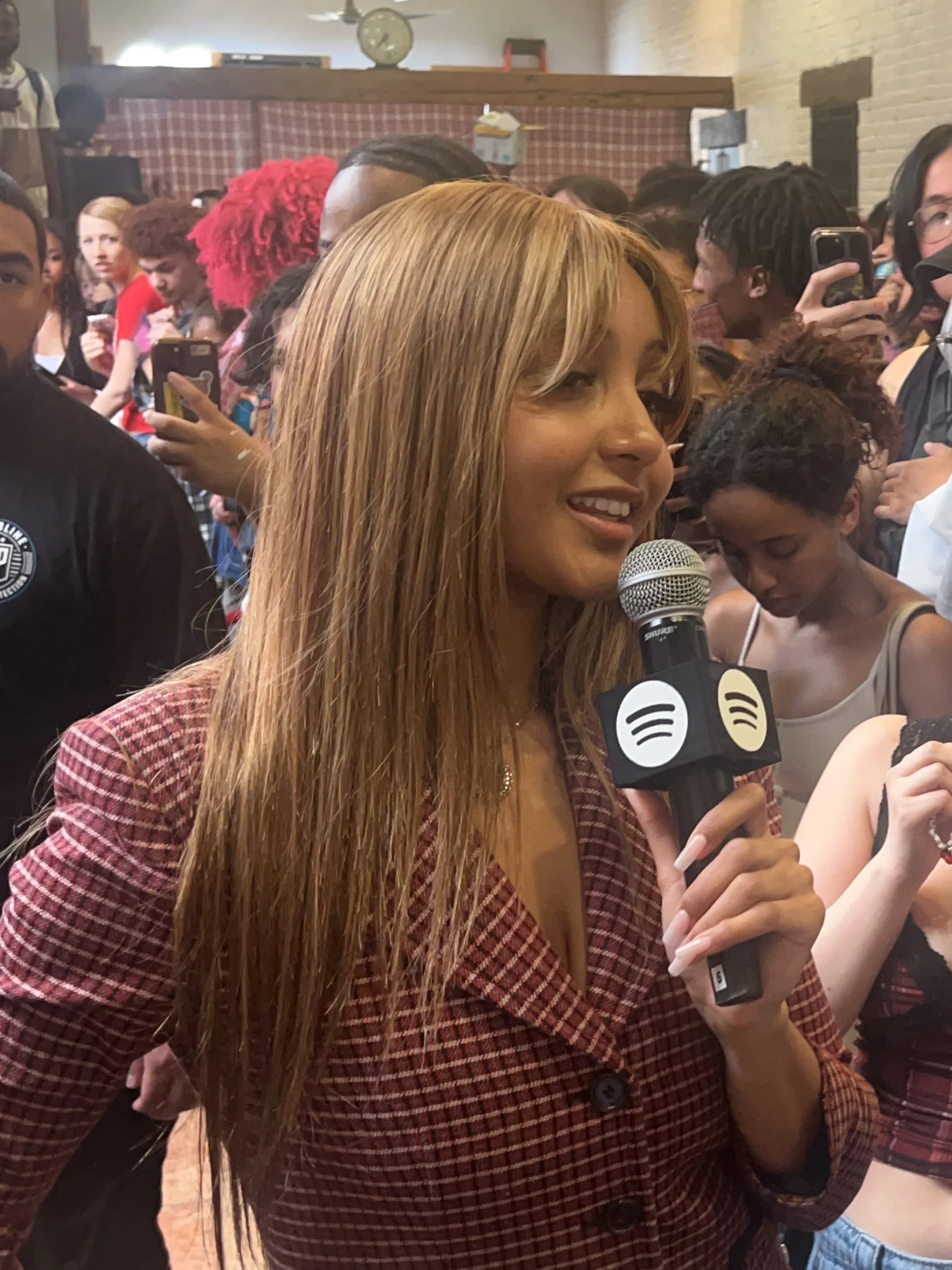
PinkPantheress

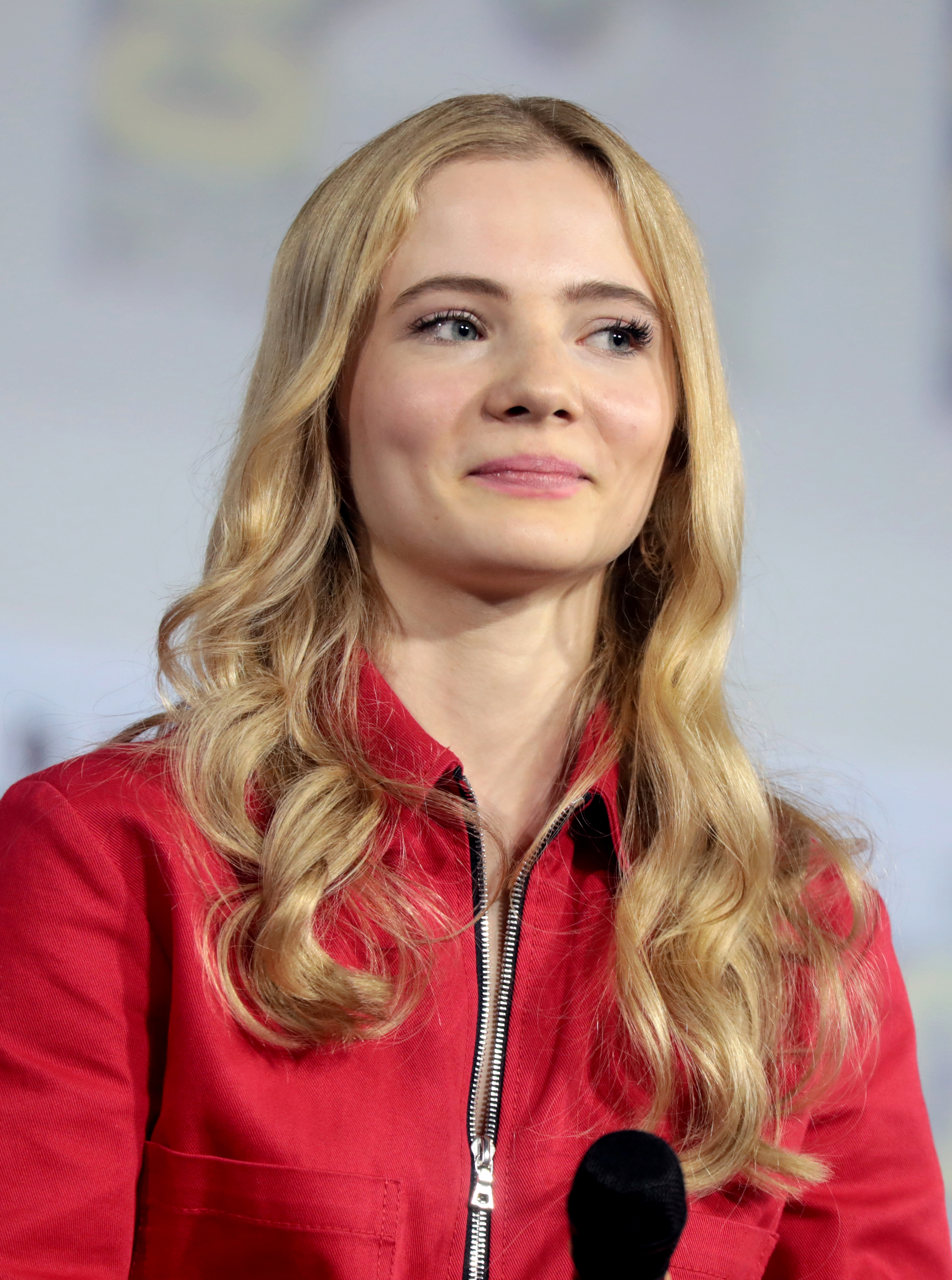
Freya Allan

- 30 January – Curtis Jones, footballer
- 23 February – Molly Conlin, actress
- 24 February
  - Anthony Gordon, footballer
  - Ramona Marquez, actress
- 13 March – James Garner, footballer
- 19 April – PinkPantheress, singer
- 23 April – Cleo Demetriou, actress
- 6 May – Gayatri Nair, pianist and vocalist
- 23 May – Brennan Johnson, footballer
- 11 June – Billy Gilmour, footballer
- 13 June – Olivia Broome, para powerlifter
- 14 June – George Martin, rugby union player
- 21 June – Eleanor Worthington Cox, actress
- 28 June – Kobe Jae Chong, Malaysian footballer
- 4 July – Mikey Lewis, rugby league player
- 10 July – Maisie Smith, actress
- 16 July – Tom Taylor, actor
- 5 September – Bukayo Saka, footballer
- 6 September – Freya Allan, actress
- 29 September – Lauren James, footballer
- 1 October – Mason Greenwood, footballer
- 9 October – Louis Hynes, actor
- 21 October – Jess Park, footballer
- 8 November – Tilly Ramsay, television presenter
- 12 November – Raffey Cassidy, actress
- 9 December – Cameron Archer, footballer
- 12 December – Michael Olise, footballer
- 13 December – Harley Bird, actress
- 16 December – Sebastian Croft, actor
- 22 December – Lily Laight, actress

== Deaths ==
=== January ===
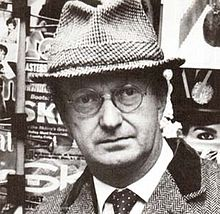
Auberon Waugh

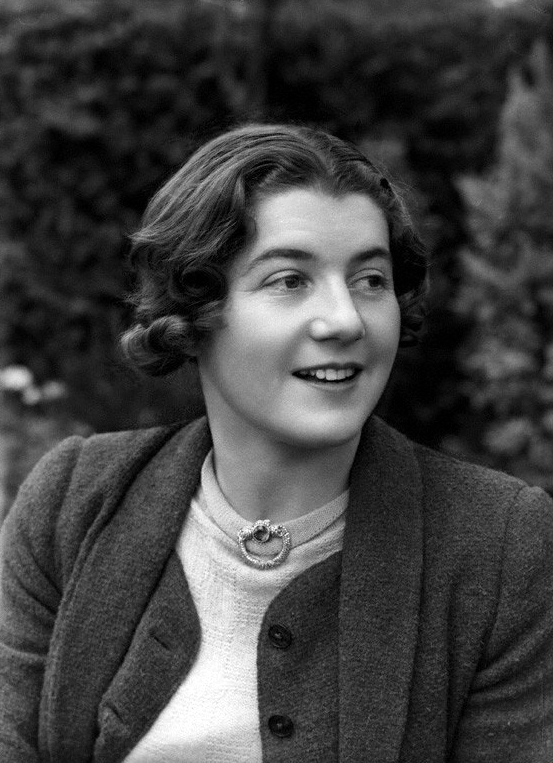
Margaret Scriven

- 1 January – Sir Michael Hanley, intelligence officer (born 1918)
- 2 January
  - George Carman, lawyer (born 1929)
  - Alison de Vere, animator (born 1927)
- 5 January – G. E. M. Anscombe, analytic philosopher (born 1919)
- 6 January – Peter Lovell-Davis, Baron Lovell-Davis, publisher and politician (born 1924)
- 7 January – Charles Cameron, magician (born 1927)
- 8 January
  - Philip A. Barker, archaeologist (born 1920)
  - Catherine Storr, children's writer, former wife of Anthony Storr (born 1913)
  - Paul Winterton, crime novelist (born 1908)
- 11 January
  - Denys Lasdun, architect (Royal National Theatre) (born 1914)
  - Lorna Sage, academic (born 1943)
  - Michael Williams, actor (born 1935)
- 14 January – Vic Wilson, racing driver (born 1931)
- 15 January – Leo Marks, author and Second World War cryptographer (born 1920)
- 16 January
  - C. Arnold Beevers, crystallographer (born 1908)
  - Auberon Waugh, author and journalist, son of Evelyn Waugh (born 1939)
- 17 January
  - Tom Kilburn, computer scientist (born 1921)
  - Robert Robertson, actor (born 1930)
- 18 January
  - Peter Haigh, television presenter (born 1925)
  - Reg Prentice, Baron Prentice, politician and life peer (born 1923)
- 20 January – Crispin Nash-Williams, mathematician (born 1932)
- 22 January – Anne Burns, aeronautical engineer and glider pilot (born 1915)
- 25 January – Margaret Scriven, tennis player (born 1912)
- 27 January – Robert Alexander Rankin, Scottish mathematician (born 1915)
- 29 January
  - Julia Bodmer, geneticist (born 1934)
  - Ninian Smart, writer and educator (born 1927)
- 30 January
  - David Heneker, composer (born 1906)
  - Johnnie Johnson, pilot (born 1915)
  - John Prebble, journalist and historian (born 1915)
  - John Taylor, Anglican prelate, Bishop of Winchester (1974–1985) (born 1914)

=== February ===
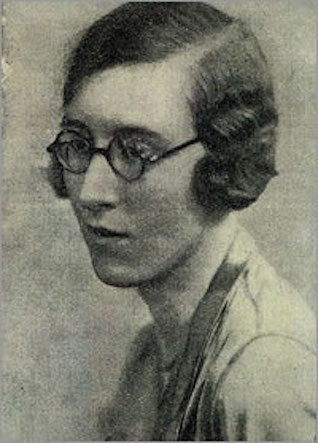
Barbara Noble

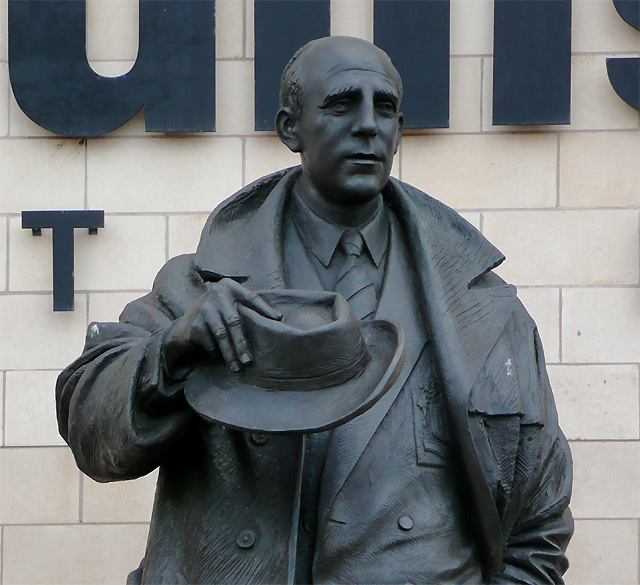
Stan Cullis

- 1 February
  - Sir Harold Maguire, air marshal (born 1912)
  - Jack Milroy, comedian and actor (born 1915)
- 3 February
  - Frederick Lawton, judge (born 1911)
  - Gerald Suster, revisionist historian and novelist (born 1951)
- 4 February
  - Barry Cockcroft, television writer and producer (born 1932)
  - Allan Mansley, English footballer (born 1946)
- 5 February – Jean Denton, Baroness Denton of Wakefield, politician and racing driver (born 1935)
- 6 February – Sir Richard Southern, historian (born 1912)
- 7 February – Sir Michael Grylls, politician and father of Bear Grylls (born 1934)
- 8 February
  - Leslie Edwards, ballet dancer (born 1916)
  - Brian Nissen, actor (born 1927)
  - Barbara Noble, novelist (born 1907)
- 9 February – Reginald Marsh, actor (born 1926)
- 11 February – Hermione, Countess of Ranfurly, peeress and author (born 1913)
- 13 February – Montague Woodhouse, 5th Baron Terrington, politician (born 1917)
- 14 February
  - Alan Ross, poet (born 1922, India)
  - Maurice Levitas, sociologist (born 1917)
- 17 February
  - Gilly Flower, actress (born 1908)
  - Christian O'Brien, geologist (born 1914)
- 18 February
  - Colin Cole, herald (born 1922)
  - Claude Davey, Welsh rugby union player (born 1908)
- 21 February
  - Ronnie Hilton, singer and radio presenter (born 1926)
  - Desmond Leslie, pilot, film maker, writer and musician (born 1921)
  - John MacKay, Baron MacKay of Ardbrecknish, politician (born 1938)
- 22 February
  - Christopher Mitchell, actor (born 1948)
  - Cledwyn Hughes, Baron Cledwyn of Penrhos, Labour politician (born 1916)
- 23 February
  - Marcus Sieff, Baron Sieff of Brimpton, businessman (born 1913)
  - Guy Wood, musician and songwriter (born 1911)
- 26 February – Frances Lincoln, publisher (born 1945)
- 28 February – Stan Cullis, footballer and manager (born 1915)

=== March ===
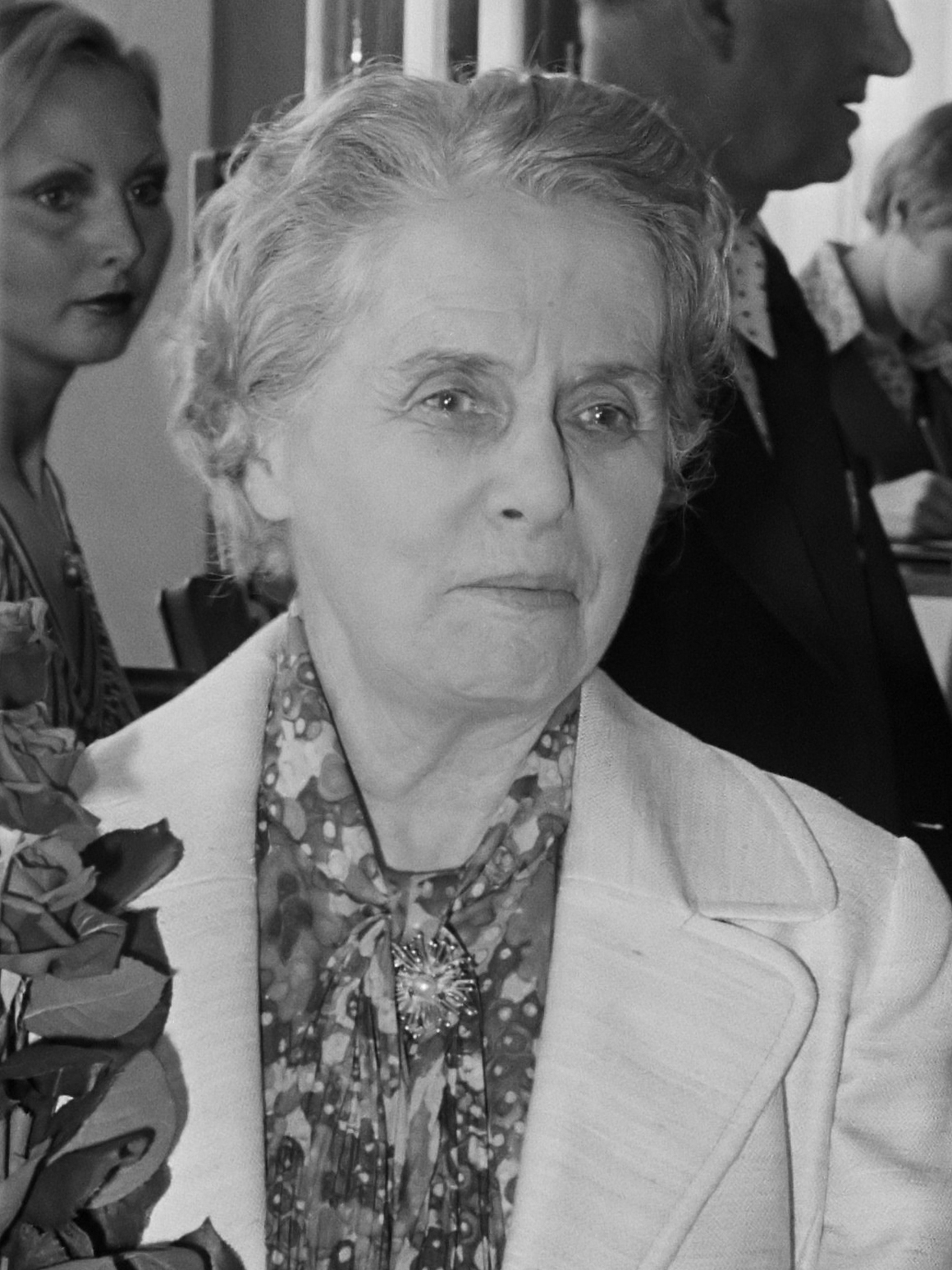
Ninette de Valois

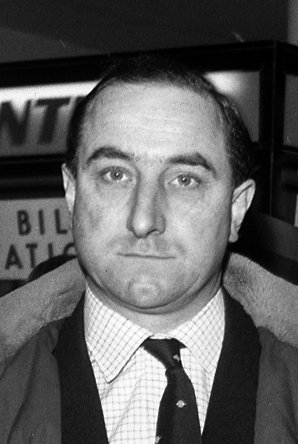
Brian Trubshaw

- 1 March
  - Joseph Cyril Bamford, businessman, founder of JCB (born 1916)
  - Colin Webster, footballer (born 1932)
- 2 March – John Diamond, journalist (born 1953)
- 4 March – Brian Jones, motorcycle designer (born 1928)
- 5 March – Ian McHarg, Scottish architect (born 1920)
- 8 March – Dame Ninette de Valois, ballerina and ballet teacher (born 1898, Ireland)
- 10 March
  - Walter Verco, herald (born 1907)
  - Michael Woodruff, surgeon and scientist (born 1911)
- 13 March
  - Bill Bland, optician and communist (born 1916)
  - Cranley Onslow, Baron Onslow of Woking, politician (born 1926)
- 17 March
  - Anthony Storr, psychiatrist and author, former husband of Catherine Storr (born 1920)
  - Ralph Thomas, film director (born 1915)
- 19 March – Norman Mitchell, actor (born 1918)
- 20 March
  - Ronald Chetwynd-Hayes, author (born 1919)
  - Doreen Gorsky, politician and television executive (born 1912)
- 21 March – Anthony Steel, actor and singer (born 1920)
- 22 March – Barry Maxwell, 12th Baron Farnham, peer (born 1931)
- 23 March
  - Anthony Bevins, journalist (born 1942)
  - Margaret Ursula Jones, archaeologist (born 1916)
- 24 March
  - N. G. L. Hammond, scholar (born 1907)
  - Brian Trubshaw, test pilot, first British person to pilot Concorde (born 1924)
  - Muriel Young, television presenter (born 1923)
- 26 March – Michael Cocks, Labour politician (born 1929)
- 27 March – Sir Kenneth Alexander, economist (born 1922)
- 31 March
  - Edward Jewesbury, actor (born 1917)
  - David Rocastle, footballer (born 1967)

=== April ===
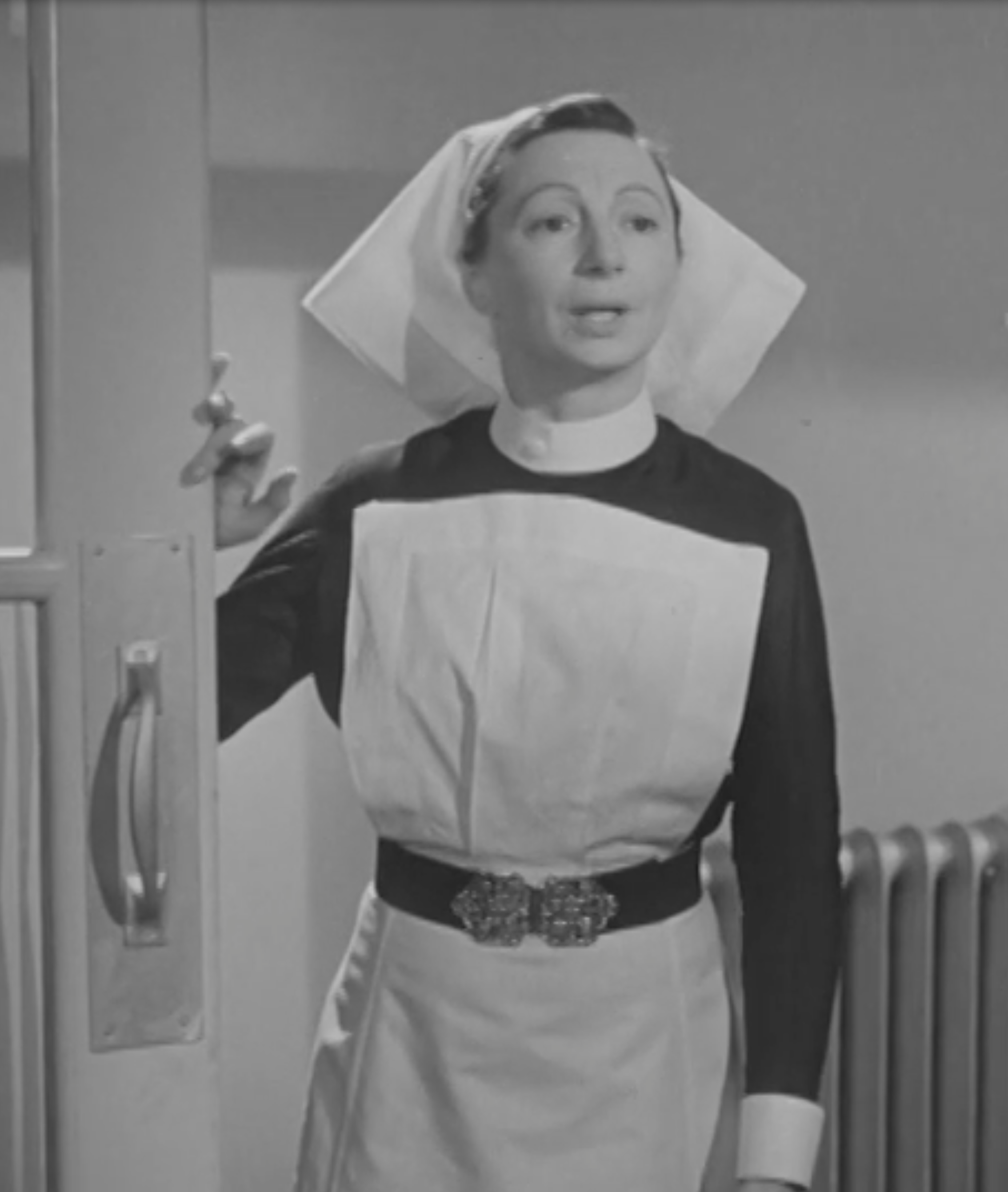
Jean Anderson

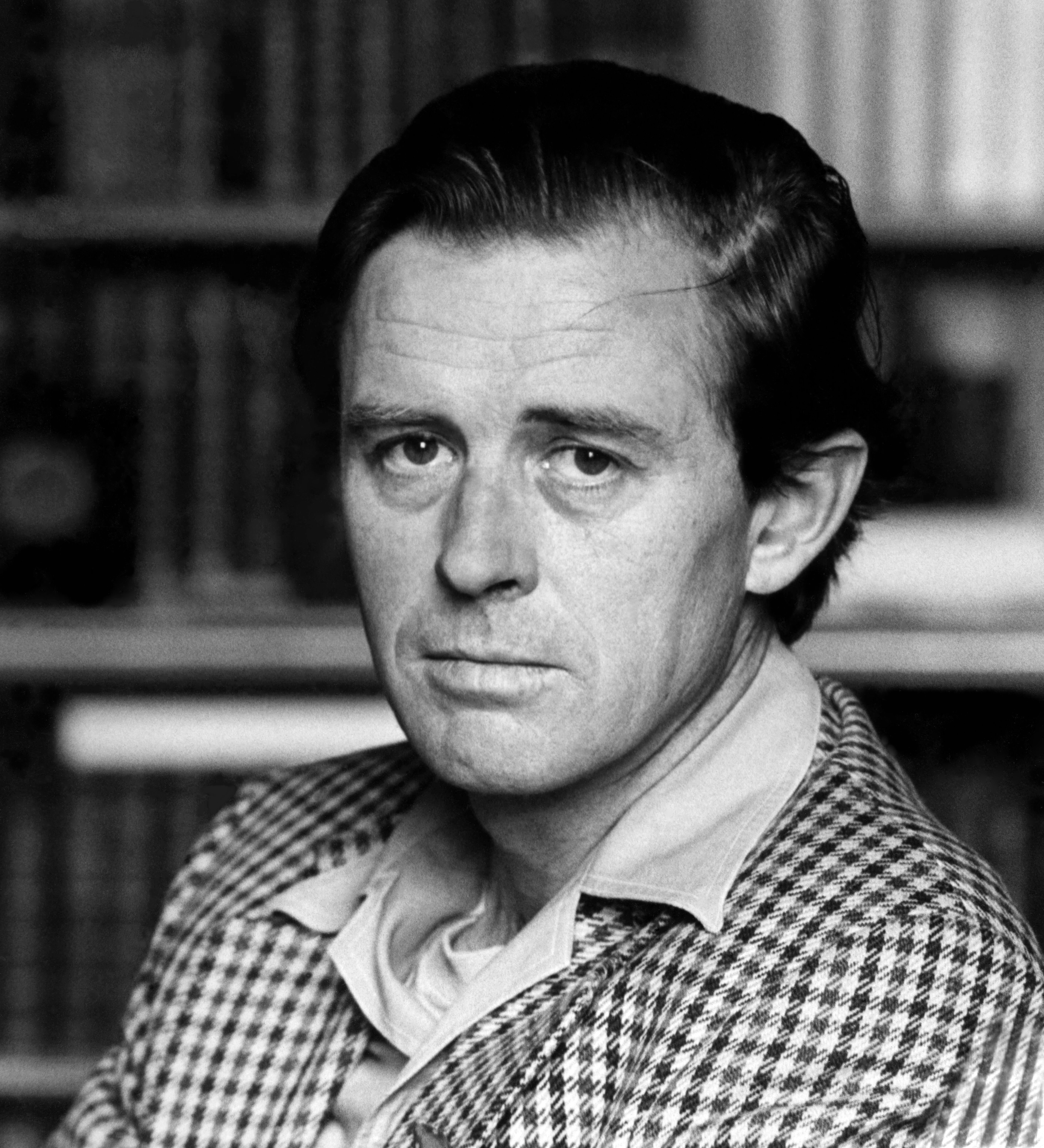
Ian Campbell, 12th Duke of Argyll

- 1 April – Jean Anderson, actress (born 1907)
- 3 April – Michael Berry, Baron Hartwell, newspaper proprietor (born 1911)
- 4 April – Beryl Gilroy, educator, novelist and poet (born 1924, British Guiana)
- 5 April
  - Sir Kingsley Dunham, geologist (born 1910)
  - David Lloyd Owen, Army general (born 1917)
  - Malcolm Shepherd, 2nd Baron Shepherd, politician (born 1918)
- 6 April – George Bull, journalist and writer (born 1929)
- 7 April – Sir Derek Lang, Army general (born 1913)
- 10 April – Nyree Dawn Porter, actress (born 1936, New Zealand)
- 11 April
  - John Harris, Baron Harris of Greenwich, journalist and politician (born 1930)
  - Harry Secombe, entertainer (born 1921)
- 13 April – Jimmy Logan, Scottish comedian, actor and theatre producer (born 1928)
- 14 April – Bryan Ranft, naval historian (born 1917)
- 16 April – Alec Stock, footballer and football manager (born 1917)
- 17 April – Terry Scully, actor (born 1932)
- 18 April – Tony Bartley, television and film executive (born 1919)
- 21 April – Ian Campbell, 12th Duke of Argyll, peer (born 1937)
- 23 April
  - Sir Charles Madden, 2nd Baronet, Royal Navy admiral (born 1906)
  - R. A. C. Parker, historian (born 1927)
- 25 April – Rita Barisse, writer, journalist and translator (born 1917)
- 26 April – Bryon Butler, sports journalist (born 1934)
- 27 April – Ernie Graham, singer-songwriter (born 1946)
- 28 April – Paul Daneman, actor (born 1925)
- 29 April – Rita Hunter, opera singer (born 1933)
- 30 April – Brian Morris, Baron Morris of Castle Morris, poet and professor of literature (born 1930)

=== May ===
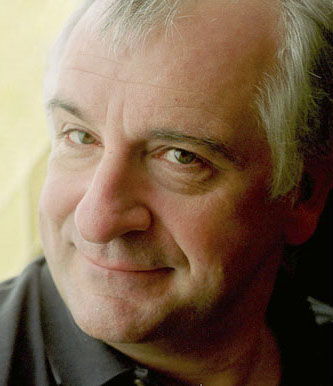
Douglas Adams

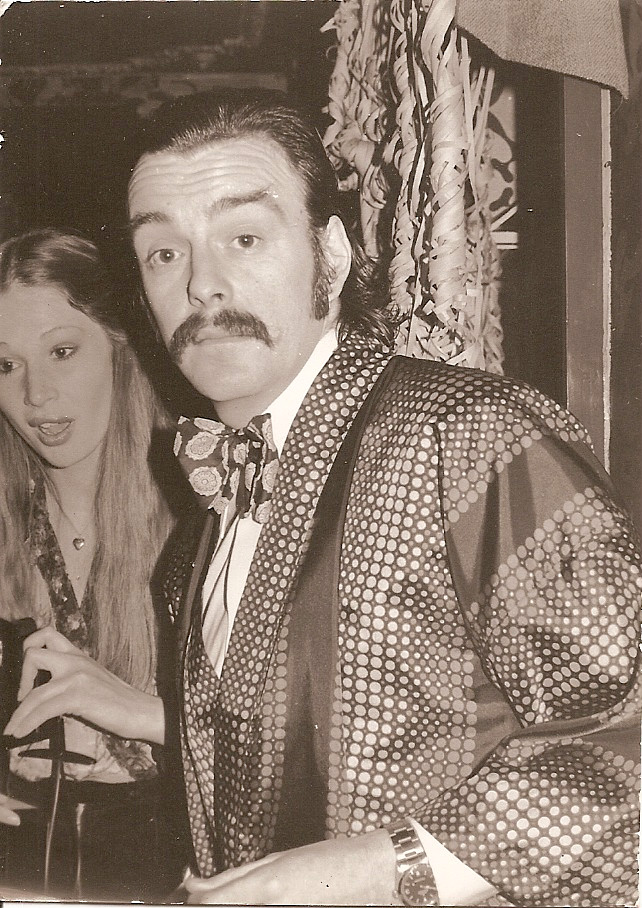
Tony Ashton

- 2 May – Ted Rogers, comedian (born 1935)
- 3 May – Robert Millner Shackleton, geologist (born 1909)
- 4 May – Rita Lawrence, pianist and singer (born 1911)
- 5 May – David Jamieson, Army officer and Victoria Cross recipient (born 1920)
- 6 May – Mike Hazlewood, singer-songwriter (born 1941)
- 7 May – Arthur Christopher Watson, colonial administrator and diplomat (born 1927)
- 9 May
  - Leslie Sands, actor (born 1921)
  - William T. Stearn, botanist (born 1911)
- 10 May – Frank Newby, structural engineer (born 1926)
- 11 May
  - Douglas Adams, writer, heart attack (born 1952)
  - Michael J. Bird, writer (born 1928)
- 12 May
  - Norman Kay, composer and writer (born 1929)
  - Simon Raven, novelist (born 1927)
- 14 May
  - Eric Bradbury, comic artist (born 1921)
  - Alex Glasgow, singer-songwriter (born 1935)
- 15 May – Bobby Murdoch, footballer (born 1944)
- 16 May – Brian Pendleton, guitarist (born 1944)
- 17 May – Enid Hattersley, Labour politician and mother of Roy Hattersley (born 1904)
- 18 May
  - Rosa Beddington, biologist (born 1956)
  - Stella Mary Newton, fashion designer (born 1901)
  - Seán Mac Stíofáin, chief-of-staff of the Provisional IRA (born 1928)
- 19 May
  - Patricia Hilliard, actress (born 1916)
  - Mike Sammes, musician and vocal session arranger (born 1928)
  - John Warner, actor (born 1924)
- 21 May – Graham Webster, archaeologist (born 1913)
- 22 May – Jack Watling, actor (born 1923)
- 23 May – Tommy Eyre, keyboardist (born 1949)
- 25 May
  - Delme Bryn-Jones, Welsh baritone (born 1934)
  - Harold Ridley, ophthalmologist (born 1903)
- 28 May – Tony Ashton, rock pianist and music producer (born 1946)
- 29 May – John Fleming, art historian (born 1919)
- 31 May – Rosemary Verey, garden designer (born 1918)

=== June ===
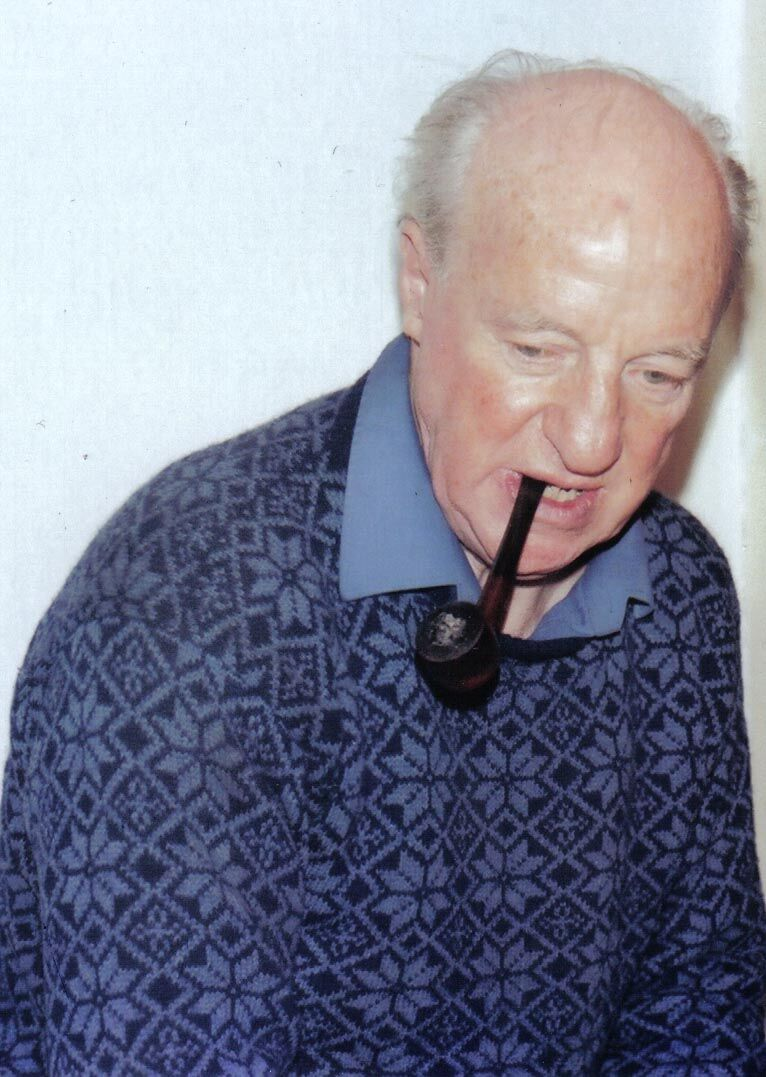
Tom Burns

- 3 June – Nicholas Albery, social inventor and author (born 1948); car accident
- 4 June – Tod Sweeney, Army colonel (born 1919)
- 5 June – Dennis Gillespie, Scottish footballer (born 1936)
- 7 June – Betty Neels, novelist (born 1909)
- 8 June – Don Roper, footballer (born 1922)
- 9 June
  - Ronnie Allen, footballer and manager (born 1929)
  - Yaltah Menuhin, pianist, artist and poet, sister of Yehudi Menuhin (born 1921, United States)
- 12 June
  - Joseph Brady, actor (born 1928)
  - W. D. Davies, Congregationalist minister and theologian (born 1911)
  - Thomas Wilson, composer (born 1927)
- 16 June – Arthur Wheeler, motorcyclist (born 1916)
- 17 June – Thomas Winning, Archbishop of Glasgow (born 1925)
- 18 June – Dame Rosamund Holland-Martin, social welfare campaigner (born 1914)
- 19 June
  - Lindsay L. Cooper, Scottish musician (born 1940)
  - Jerry Cornes, athlete (born 1910, British India)
  - David Sylvester, art critic (born 1924)
- 20 June
  - Angela Browne, actress (born 1938)
  - Tom Burns, sociologist (born 1913)
- 21 June – Vernon Sewell, film director and screenwriter (born 1903)
- 24 June – Nicola Ann Raphael, Scottish schoolgirl (born 1985); suicide caused by bullying
- 26 June – Louis Klemantaski, photographer (born 1912, China)
- 27 June – Joan Sims, actress (born 1930)
- 29 June – Mary Barnes, artist (born 1923)
- 30 June – Joe Fagan, footballer and manager (born 1921)

=== July ===
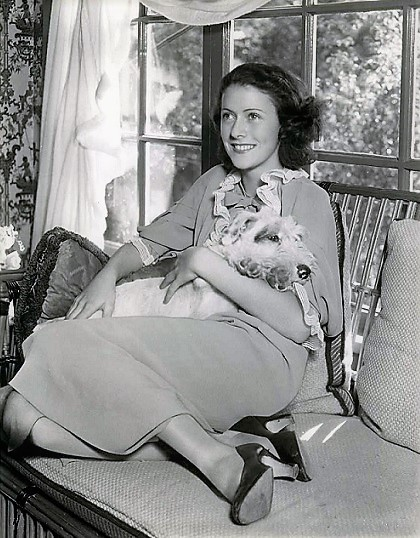
Molly Lamont

- 2 July – Jack Gwillim, character actor (born 1909)
- 3 July
  - Delia Derbyshire, composer of electronic music (born 1937)
  - John Marriott, philatelist (born 1922)
- 5 July – George Ffitch, journalist and broadcaster (born 1929)
- 7 July – Molly Lamont, actress (born 1910)
- 8 July – Neil Midgley, football referee (born 1942)
- 12 July
  - James Bernard, film composer (born 1925)
  - Johnny Wright, boxer (born 1929)
- 13 July – Eleanor Summerfield, actress (born 1921)
- 14 July
  - Jack Sheppard, cave diver (born 1909)
  - Arthur Worsley, ventriloquist (born 1920)
- 15 July – Tom Chantrell, illustrator (born 1916)
- 16 July
  - Tom Askwith, Olympic rower and colonial administrator (born 1911)
  - Christina Miller, chemist (born 1899)
- 17 July
  - Val Feld, Welsh politician (born 1947)
  - Kenneth Boyd Fraser, virologist and World War II hero (born 1917)
- 18 July
  - Roderic Bowen, Liberal politician (born 1913)
  - Phil Clancey, ornithologist (born 1917)
- 19 July
  - Paul Beeson, cinematographer (born 1921)
  - Neil Carmichael, Baron Carmichael of Kelvingrove, politician (born 1921)
- 22 July
  - Bertie Felstead, World War I soldier, last survivor of the Christmas truce of 1914 (born 1894)
  - David Nelson, English rugby league player (murdered) (born 1962)
- 26 July – Charles Rob, surgeon (born 1913)
- 28 July – Eric Bedford, architect (BT Tower) (born 1909)
- 30 July – John Walters, radio presenter and musician (born 1939)
- 31 July – Philip Gaskell, bibliographer and librarian (born 1926)

=== August ===
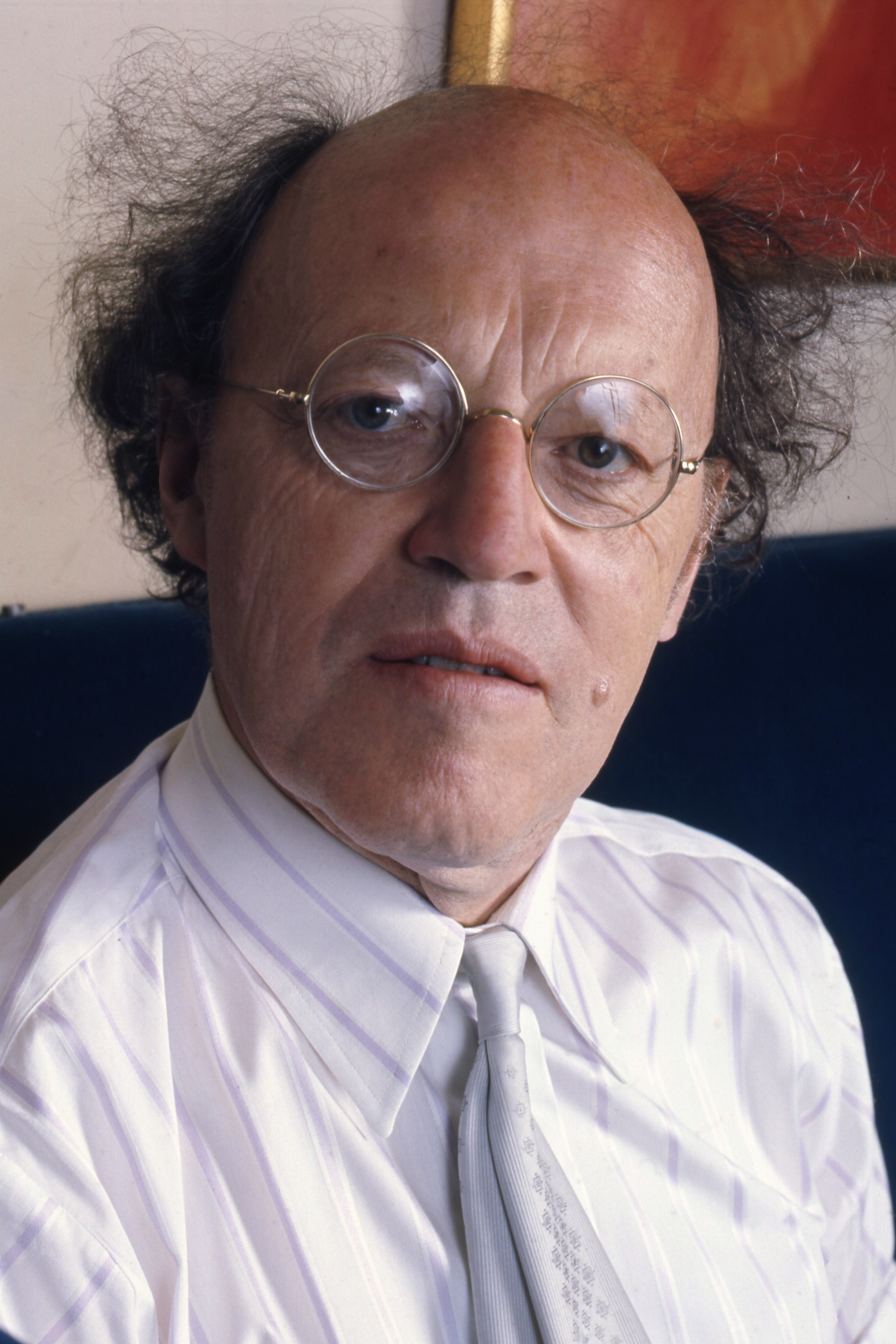
Frank Pakenham, 7th Earl of Longford

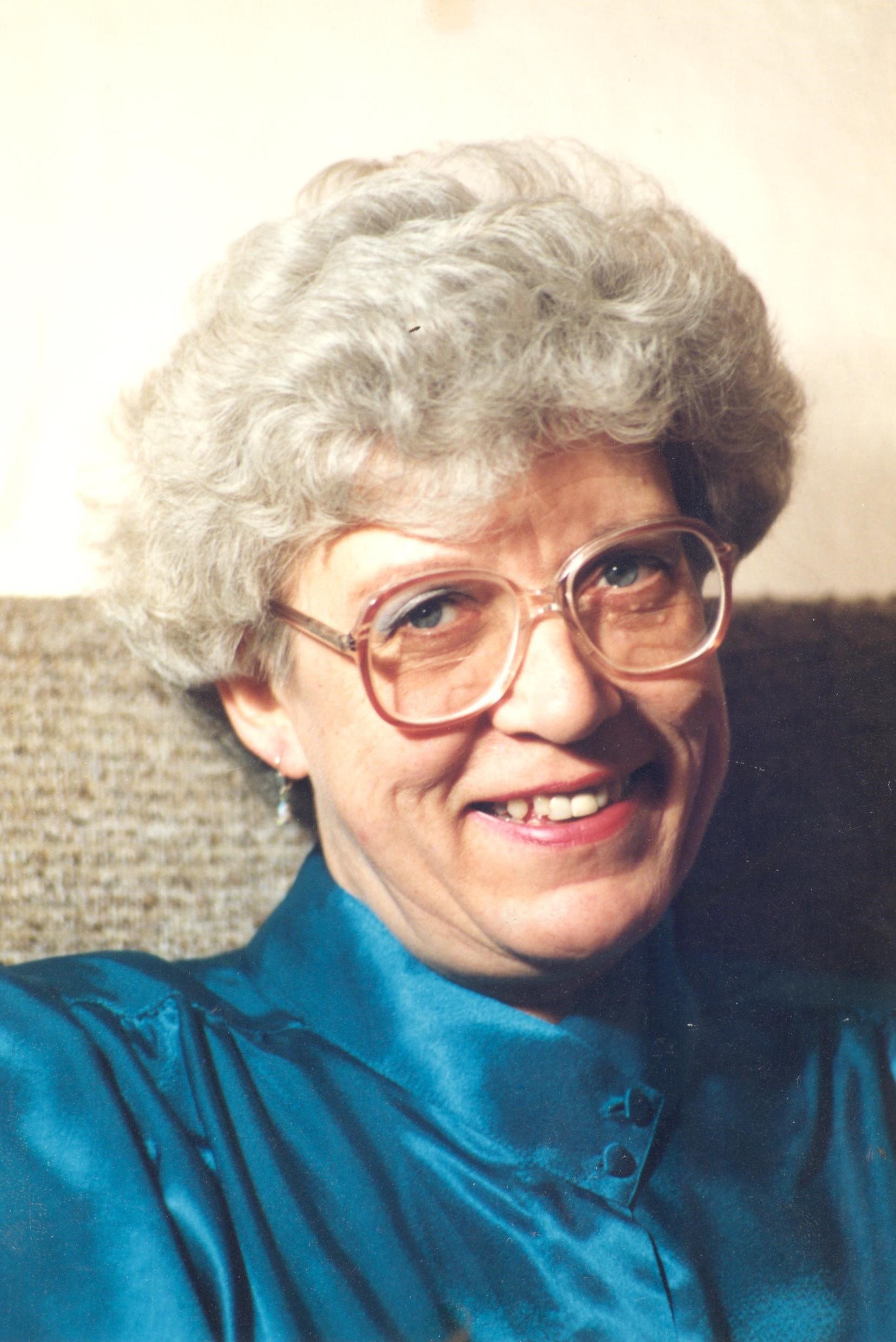
Rose Edgcumbe

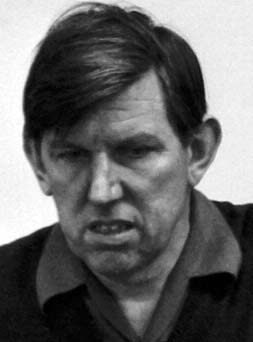
Ken Tyrrell

- 2 August – Sir Edward Gardner, politician (born 1912)
- 3 August
  - Christopher Hewett, actor (born 1921)
  - Frank Pakenham, 7th Earl of Longford, peer, politician and social reformer (born 1905)
- 4 August – Sir Paterson Fraser, air marshal (born 1907)
- 5 August – Aaron Flahavan, footballer (born 1975); car accident
- 6 August
  - Kenneth MacDonald, actor (born 1950)
  - Ian Ousby, historian and author (born 1947)
  - Dame Dorothy Tutin, actress (born 1930)
- 8 August
  - Patrick David Wall, neuroscientist (born 1925)
  - Paul Vaessen, English footballer (born 1961); drug overdose
  - Paul Weatherley, botanist (born 1917)
- 9 August
  - Humphry Bowen, botanist and chemist (born 1929)
  - Alec Skempton, scientist (born 1914)
- 11 August
  - Edward Thomas Hall, scientist who proved Piltdown Man was a fraud (born 1924)
  - Percy Stallard, racing cyclist (born 1909)
- 12 August
  - Irene Astor, Baroness Astor of Hever, peeress and philanthropist (born 1919)
  - Julian Pitt-Rivers, social anthropologist (born 1919)
  - Sir Walter Walker, Army general (born 1912)
- 13 August – Jimmy Knapp, trade unionist, General Secretary of the RMT since 1990 (born 1940)
- 17 August – Sir Ralph Verney, 5th Baronet, Army major and conservationist (born 1915)
- 18 August
  - David Peakall, toxicologist (born 1931)
  - Tom Watson, Scottish actor (born 1932)
- 19 August – Les Sealey, footballer and coach (born 1957)
- 20 August – Fred Hoyle, astronomer (born 1915)
- 21 August – Beryl Cooke, actress (born 1906)
- 22 August – Rose Edgcumbe, psychologist and psychoanalyst (born 1934)
- 23 August – Eric Allandale, jazz musician (born 1936, Dominica)
- 25 August
  - Madge Adam, astronomer (born 1912)
  - Ken Tyrrell, British auto racing driver (born 1924)
- 26 August – John Horn, tennis player (born 1931)
- 28 August – Sir Kenneth Maddocks, colonial official, Governor of Fiji (1958–1963) (born 1907)
- 29 August – Roger Daley, meteorologist (born 1943)
- 31 August – Paul Hamlyn, Baron Hamlyn, publisher and philanthropist (born 1926)

=== September ===
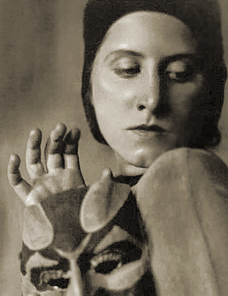
Hilde Holger

- 1 September – Brian Moore, sports commentator (born 1932)
- 3 September – John Chapman, actor and screenwriter (born 1927)
- 4 September – Kathleen Sully, novelist (born 1910)
- 5 September – David Peter Lafayette Hunter, Royal Marines officer (born 1919)
- 7 September – Bunny Lewis, record producer and music manager (born 1918)
- 8 September – Eric Bullus, Conservative politician (born 1906)
- 11 September
  - Henry Herbert, 7th Earl of Carnarvon, peer and racing manager to Queen Elizabeth II (born 1924)
  - Rick Rescorla, British-born American soldier and police officer, killed in the September 11 attacks (born 1939)
- 14 September – Barbara Ansell, rheumatologist (born 1923)
- 17 September – Dickie Dodds, cricketer (born 1919)
- 21 September – Ross Parker, student (murdered) (born 1984)
- 22 September
  - Hilde Holger, dancer and dance teacher (born 1909, Austria-Hungary)
  - Leslie Howarth, mathematician (born 1911)
  - Gordon Reece, journalist and political strategist (born 1929)
- 23 September – W. S. Barrett, classical scholar (born 1914)
- 24 September
  - Peter Shore, Baron Shore of Stepney, politician (born 1924)
  - Arthur Wynn, civil servant and recruiter of Soviet spies (born 1910)
- 27 September – Helen Cherry, actress (born 1915)
- 28 September – R. J. Hollingdale, biographer (born 1930)

=== October ===
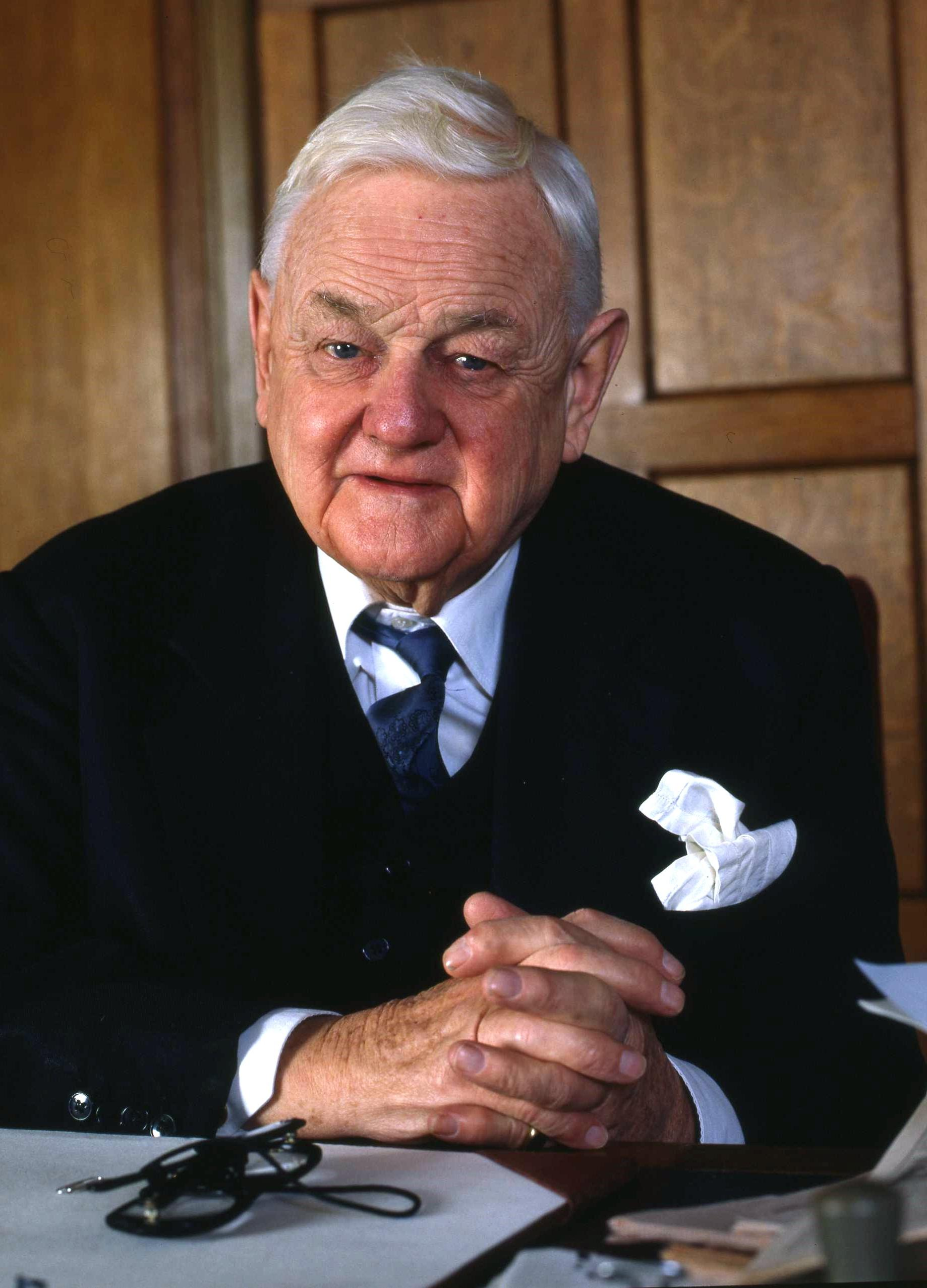
Quintin Hogg, Baron Hailsham of St Marylebone

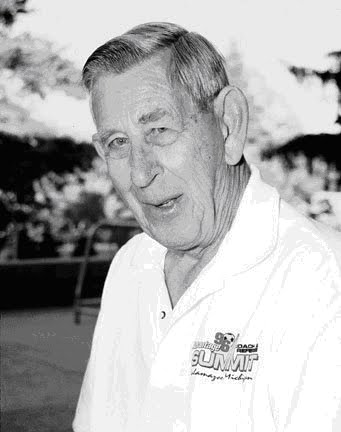
Ken Aston

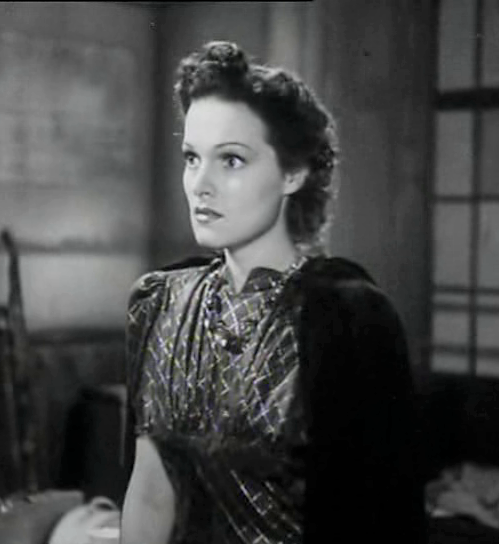
Linden Travers

- 3 October – Lady Jean Rankin, Scottish naturalist and courtier (born 1905)
- 4 October
  - Patsy Burt, racing driver (born 1928)
  - George Claydon, actor (born 1933)
- 7 October
  - Christopher Adams, wrestler (murdered in the United States) (born 1955)
  - Alf Gover, English cricketer (born 1908)
  - Reg Matthews, English footballer (born 1933)
- 12 October
  - Richard Buckle, ballet critic (born 1916)
  - Quintin Hogg, Baron Hailsham of St Marylebone, politician (born 1907)
- 13 October – David Neil MacKenzie, linguist (born 1926)
- 14 October
  - Eugene Grebenik, demographer (born 1919, Ukraine)
  - Vernon Harrison, photographer and parapsychologist (born 1912)
- 15 October
  - Jamie Cann, Labour politician (born 1946)
  - Anne Ridler, poet and editor (born 1912)
- 17 October – Frank Anscombe, statistician (born 1918)
- 18 October – Ray Lovejoy, film editor (born 1939)
- 19 October – Kay Dick, journalist and novelist (born 1915)
- 21 October
  - Margaret Hope MacPherson, Scottish crofter and activist (born 1908)
  - J. H. Plumb, historian (born 1911)
- 23 October
  - Ken Aston, football referee who developed the penalty card system (born 1915)
  - Josh Kirby, artist (born 1928)
  - Linden Travers, actress (born 1913)
- 24 October – Kim Gardner, musician (born 1948)
- 26 October
  - Elizabeth Jennings, poet (born 1926)
  - John Platts-Mills, lawyer and politician (born 1906)
  - Richard Seifert, architect (NatWest Tower) (born 1910, Switzerland)
  - Audrey Withers, magazine editor (born 1905)
- 28 October – Sir John Mogg, Army general (born 1913)
- 31 October
  - Jenny Laird, actress (born 1912)
  - Bill Le Sage, jazz musician (born 1927)
  - Angus MacVicar, Scottish author (born 1908)

=== November ===
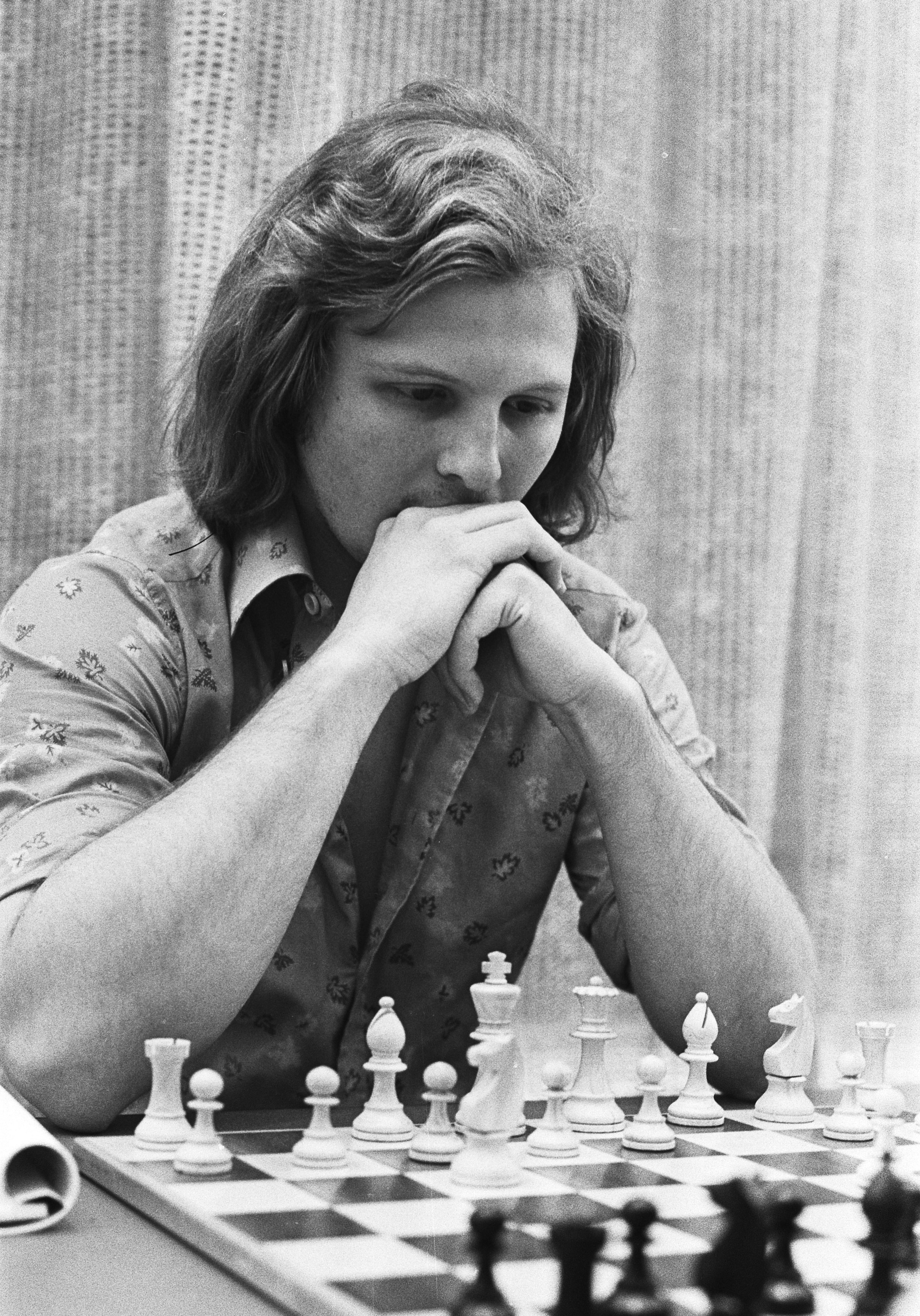
Tony Miles

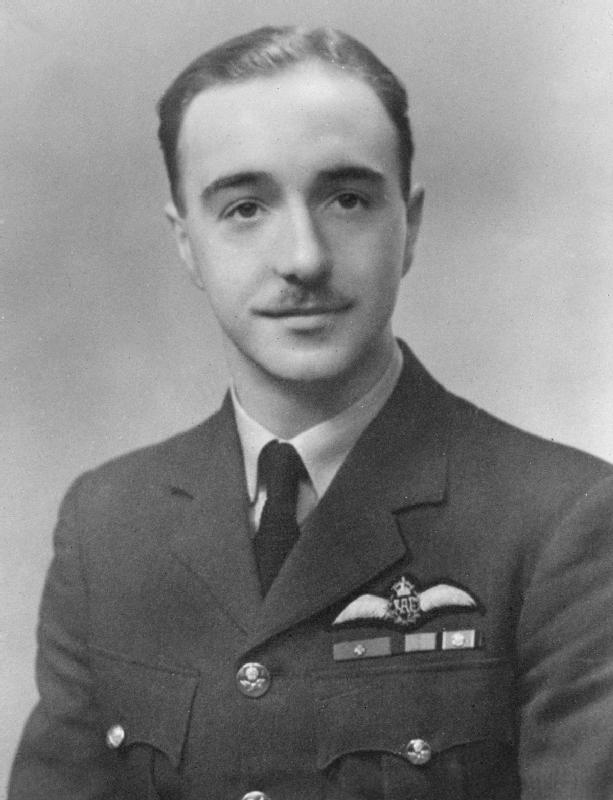
William Reid

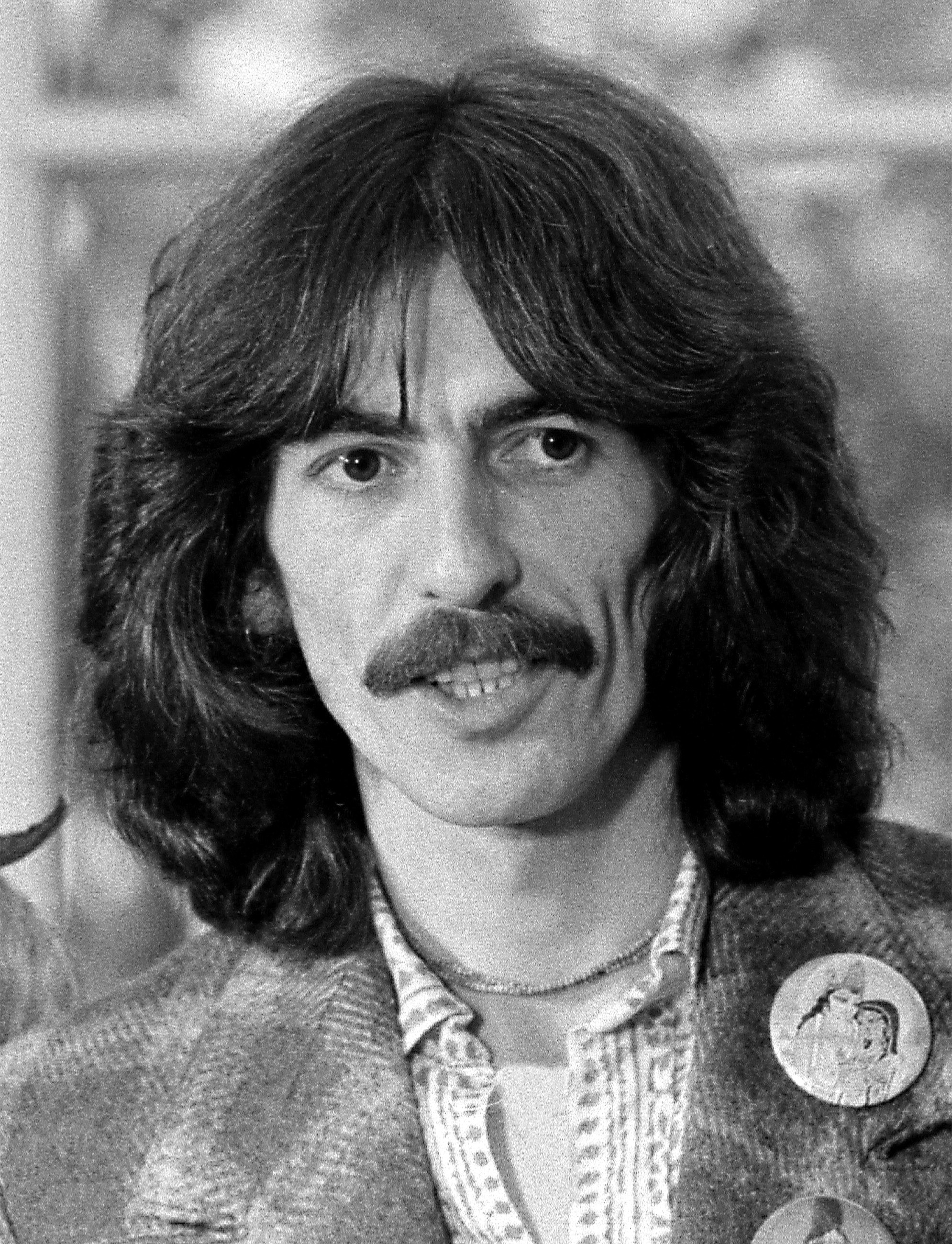
George Harrison

- 2 November
  - Olivia Hamnett, actress (born 1943)
  - William Whitlock, Labour politician (born 1918)
- 3 November
  - Doug Hele, motorcycle designer (born 1919)
  - Ernst Gombrich, art historian (born 1909, Austria-Hungary)
- 5 November
  - Roy Boulting, film director and producer (born 1913)
  - Barry Horne, animal rights activist (born 1952)
  - Joan Marion, actress (born 1908, Australia)
- 6 November – Anthony Shaffer, playwright (born 1926)
- 7 November – Sir Ivan Neill, Northern Irish politician (born 1906)
- 8 November
  - Anno Birkin, poet and musician (car accident) (born 1980)
  - Albrecht Fröhlich, mathematician (born 1916, German Empire)
  - Peter Laslett, historian (born 1915)
- 9 November – Dorothy Dunnett, novelist (born 1923)
- 10 November – Michael Lucas, 2nd Baron Lucas of Chilworth, peer and politician (born 1926)
- 11 November – Sir Denis Spotswood, RAF air marshal (born 1916)
- 12 November – Tony Miles, chess player, first British Grandmaster (born 1955)
- 13 November – Peggy Mount, actress (born 1915)
- 14 November
  - Charlotte Coleman, actress (born 1968)
  - Hugh Verity, RAF pilot (born 1918)
- 15 November – Megan Boyd, fly tyer (born 1915)
- 16 November – Rosemary Brown, composer and spiritualist (born 1916)
- 18 November – Malcolm McFee, actor (born 1949)
- 22 November
  - Theo Barker, social and economic historian (born 1923)
  - Ronald Cuthbert Hay, Royal Marine fighter ace (born 1916)
- 23 November – Mary Whitehouse, campaigner against social liberalism (born 1910)
- 24 November – Rachel Gurney, actress (born 1920)
- 25 November – David Gascoyne, poet (born 1916)
- 27 November – Jane Welsh, actress (born 1905)
- 28 November
  - Norman Lumsden, opera singer (born 1906)
  - William Reid, RAF pilot and Victoria Cross recipient (born 1921)
- 29 November – George Harrison, rock musician (The Beatles) and film producer, lung cancer (born 1943); died in the USA

=== December ===
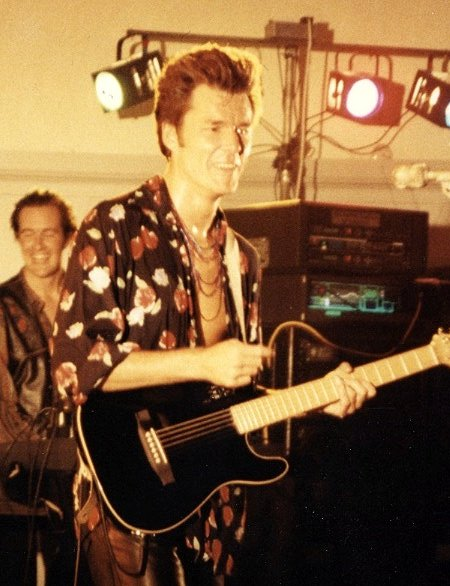
Stuart Adamson

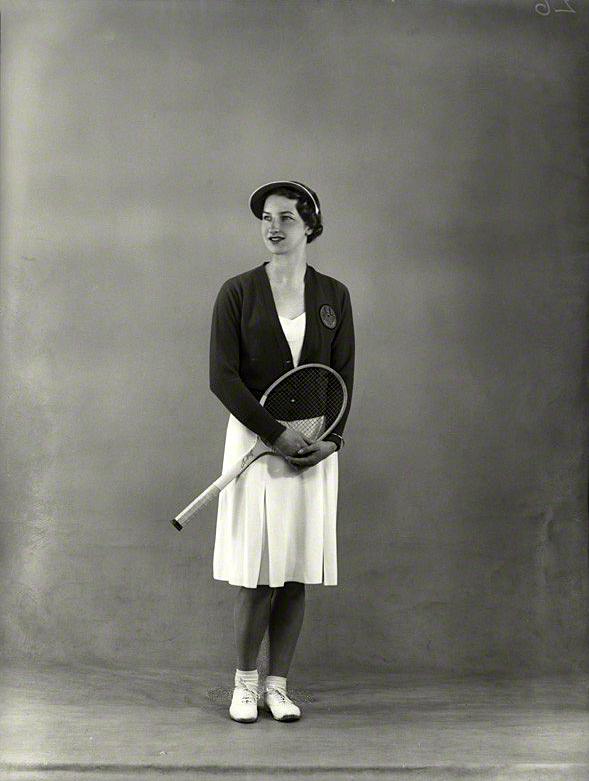
Mary Hardwick

- 2 December
  - Bruce Halford, racing driver (born 1931)
  - Martha Kneale, philosopher (born 1909)
- 5 December – Bill Roberts, athlete (born 1912)
- 6 December
  - Colin Buchanan, town planner (born 1907)
  - Thomas William Gould, Royal Navy sailor and Victoria Cross recipient (born 1914)
- 7 December
  - David Astor, newspaper publisher (born 1912)
  - Ray Powell, politician (born 1928)
- 9 December – Sir Michael Carver, Army general (born 1915)
- 11 December – Bert Axell, naturalist (born 1915)
- 12 December – Michael Torrens-Spence, Royal Navy pilot in World War II (born 1914)
- 13 December – Michael Bradshaw, actor (born 1933)
- 16 December – Stuart Adamson, guitarist, vocalist and songwriter (born 1958)
- 17 December – Gerald Ashby, football referee (born 1949)
- 18 December
  - Mary Hardwick, tennis player (born 1913)
  - Clifford T. Ward, singer-songwriter (born 1944)
- 20 December
  - Edward Evans, actor (born 1914)
  - Sir Peter Horsley, RAF commander (born 1921)
- 23 December – Dimitri Obolensky, historian and professor (born 1918, Russia)
- 24 December – Gareth Williams, musician (born 1953)
- 26 December
  - Nigel Hawthorne, actor (born 1929)
  - George Rochester, physicist (born 1908)
- 27 December
  - Jack Beeching, poet and novelist (born 1922)
  - Ian Hamilton, poet, critic and magazine publisher (born 1938)
  - Paul Hogarth, artist (born 1917)
- 28 December – Anthony Royle, Baron Fanshawe of Richmond, politician (born 1927)
- 30 December
  - Eric Cheney, motorcycle designer (born 1924)
  - Dame Sheila Sherlock, physician (born 1918)
- 31 December – John Grigg, writer, historian and politician (born 1924)

== See also ==
- 2001 in British music
- 2001 in British television
- List of British films of 2001
