= Melcher Risberg =

Swedish cross-country skier

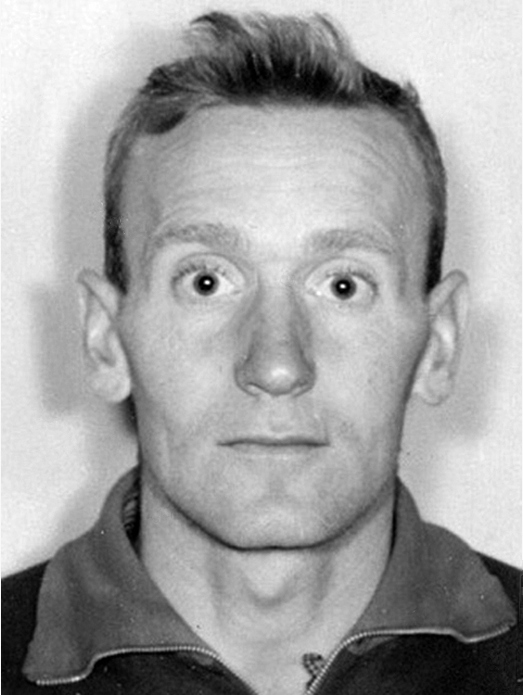

Personal information
- Nationality: Swedish
- Born: 16 February 1930; Offerdal, Sweden
- Died: 31 August 2001 (aged 71); Hammerdal, Sweden

Sport
- Sport: Cross-country skiing
- Club: Hammerdals IF 1964; Föllinge IK 1968

Melcher Risberg (16 February 1930 – 31 August 2001) was a Swedish cross-country skier. He competed in the 50 km race at the 1964 and 1968 Winter Olympics and placed tenth and fifth, respectively.
