= Mervyn McKinnon =

New Zealand hockey player

Personal information
- Full name: Mervyn Leslie McKinnon
- Nationality: New Zealand
- Born: 9 July 1931 Christchurch, New Zealand
- Died: 28 August 2001 (aged 70)

Sport
- Sport: Field hockey

Mervyn McKinnon (9 July 1931 – 28 August 2001) was a New Zealand field hockey player. He competed in the men's tournament at the 1960 Summer Olympics.
