= Josef Fried =

Polish-American organic chemist

Joseph Fried (July 21, 1914 – August 17, 2001) was a Polish-American organic chemist, member of the National Academy of Sciences and the American Academy of Arts and Sciences. He held 200 patents on chemical compounds, with 43 listing him as the sole holder. He was a professor of chemistry and biochemistry at the University of Chicago. Fried discovered fluorohydrocortisone, a chemical used to treat adrenal disorders. He was also director of the organic chemistry at the Squibb Institute. His discoveries were instrumental to the creation of medications to treat inflammatory disorders including as arthritis, psoriasis, and various skin allergies. National Academies Press called him "an outstanding organic chemist who made very special contributions to the field of medicine". Elias James Corey said of Fried: "He was an outstanding, highly creative scientist who straddled both the worlds of pharmaceutical research and academic science. He was one of my heroes, and I've always thought of him as a model scientist of great character and great human warmth."

== Awards and distinctions ==
Fried became a member of the National Academy of Sciences in 1971. He became a member of the American Academy of Arts and Sciences in 1981. He received the Medicinal Chemistry Award in 1974 from the American Chemical Society. He also received the Alfred Burger Award in Medicinal Chemistry in 1996. He also received the Gregory Pincus Medal from the Worcester Foundation for Experimental Biology and the Roussel Prize from the Roussel Scientific Institute in Paris in 1994. Bristol-Myers Squibb and the University of Chicago launched in 1990 the first of a series of annual Josef Fried Symposia of Bioorganic Chemistry. Fried is a member of the Medicinal Chemistry Hall of Fame.

== Career ==
Josef Fried was born in the town of Przemyśl, Poland, on July 21, 1914. Fried received his Ph.D. in organic chemistry from Columbia University in 1940. Fried joined the Squibb Institute in 1944 as a head of its antibiotics and steroids department. He was later promoted to director of the organic chemistry section in 1959. In 1963 Fried was appointed professor at the Ben May Laboratory for Cancer Research at the University of Chicago.
