= Robert Cayman =

Belgian hockey player

Personal information
- Nationality: Belgian
- Born: 17 March 1919 London, England
- Died: 20 August 2001 (aged 82) Hoboken, Belgium

Sport
- Sport: Field hockey

Robert Cayman (17 March 1919 – 20 August 2001) was a Belgian field hockey player. He competed in the men's tournament at the 1948 Summer Olympics.
