= Karol Szenajch =

Polish ice hockey player

- Born: 11 February 1907; Warsaw, Russian Empire
- Died: 1 August 2001 (aged 94); Montreal, Quebec, Canada
- Position: Centre
- Played for: WTL Warsaw; Legia Warsaw
- National team: Poland
- Playing career: 1926–1935

Karol Wilhelm Szenajch (also known as Schöneich, 11 February 1907 in Warsaw - 1 August 2001 in Montreal) was a Polish ice hockey player who competed in the 1928 Winter Olympics.

In 1928 he participated with the Polish ice hockey team in the Olympic tournament. At the onset of World War II he emigrated to Montreal, Quebec, where he died.
