= Rose Edgcumbe =

British psychoanalyst

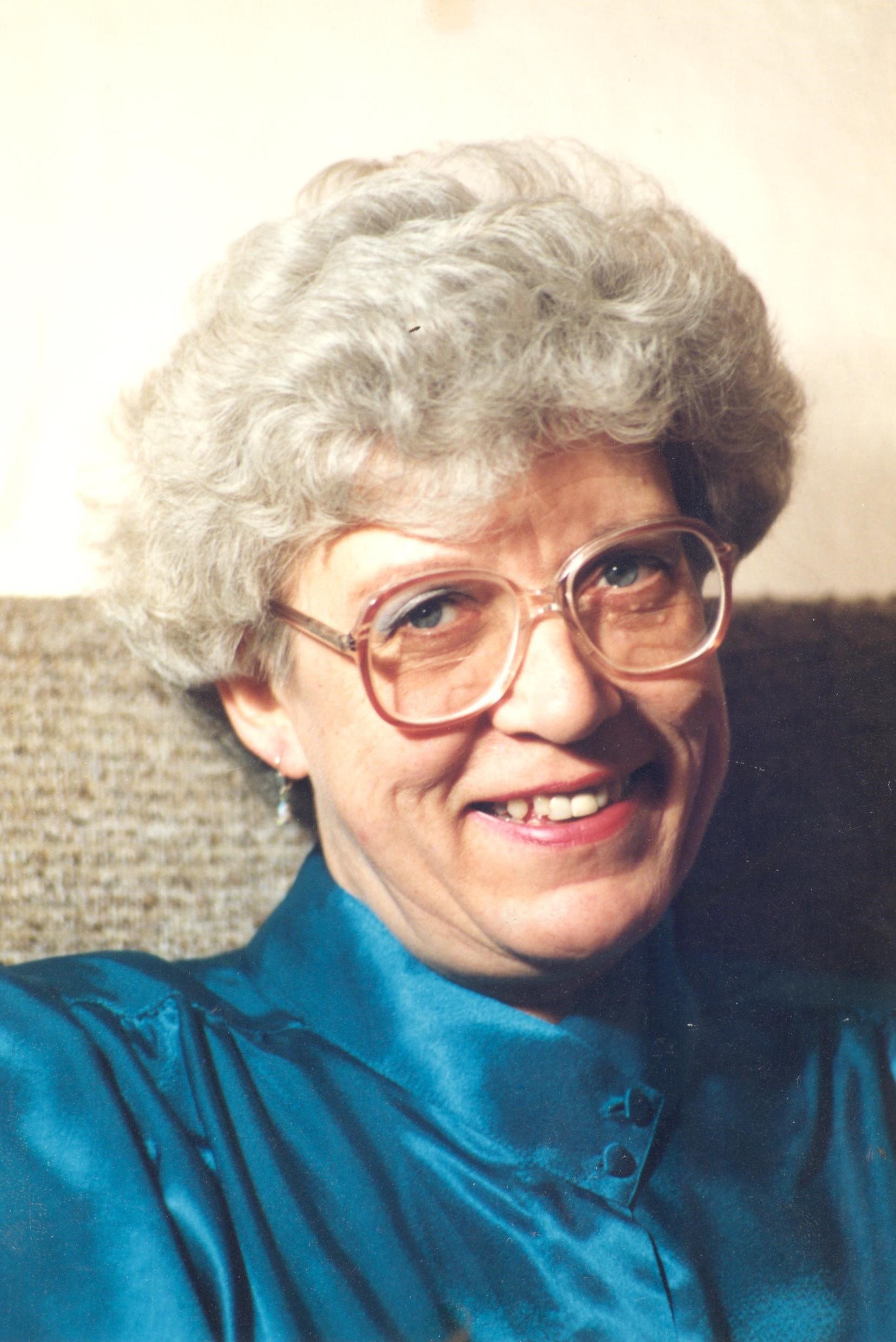
- Born: 12 May 1934; London, England
- Died: 22 August 2001 (aged 67)
- Education: University College London
- Spouse: Peter Theobald

Rose Edgcumbe (12 May 1934 – 22 August 2001), sometimes known as Rose Edgcumbe Theobald, was a British psychoanalyst, psychologist and child development researcher.

== Biography ==
Edgcumbe was born in London, and as a child during the London Blitz of World War II, she and her mother were evacuated to Yorkshire in northern England for their safety. The effect of these evacuations on the psyche of young children would later play a part in her research.

Edgcumbe studied at the South Hampstead High School for Girls, and attended University College London specializing in psychology. As a Fulbright scholar in the 1950s, she worked as a clinical psychologist in the United States to further her psychology research. She also spent time in a hospital working with children labeled "mentally deficient" thus sparking a lasting interest in child developmental psychology. According to Clifford Yorke, who wrote her obituary, "she had also become dissatisfied with what she saw as the aridity of academic psychology and became more interested in psychoanalysis."

=== Psychoanalyst ===
Returning to England after her two-year scholarship, she worked at Booth Hall hospital in Manchester. The hospital's psychology department enjoyed a high reputation and Edgcumbe worked with patients there. Her next move was to the Hampstead Child Therapy Course and Clinic in London, directed by Anna Freud, Sigmund Freud's youngest daughter, where Edgcumbe began her arduous training in child analysis in 1959. (After Anna's death, the Clinic was renamed the Anna Freud Centre.) In 1963, after she completed her studies there, she was immediately invited to join its staff of psychoanalysts. Even as she became a highly respected member of the Clinic, she also trained in adult analysis at the Institute of Psychoanalysis in London.

=== Writing about Anna Freud ===
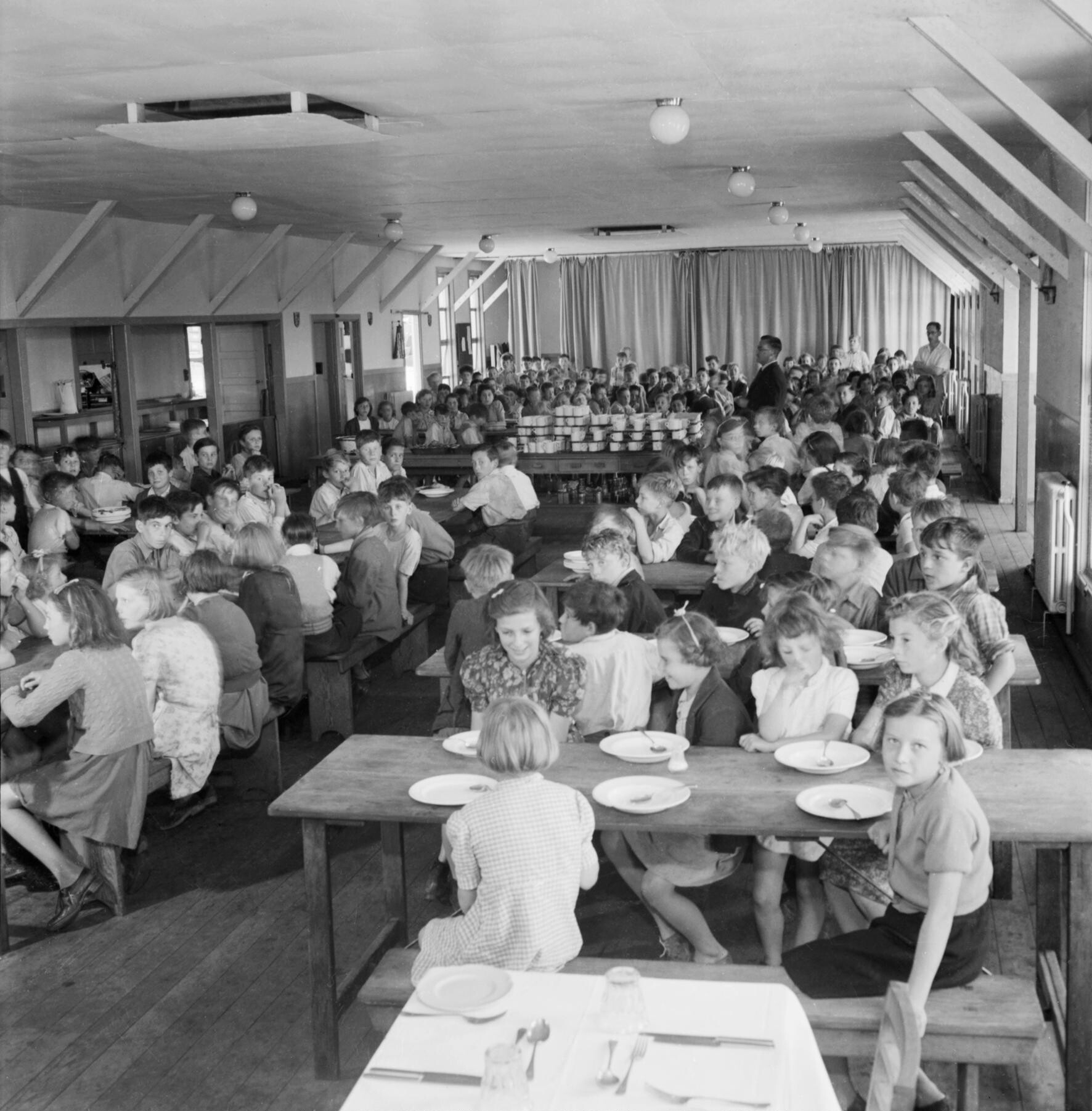
Evacuees in the dining hall of Marchant's Hill School, Hindhead, Surrey, England, 1944.

Edgcumbe contributed many papers to psychoanalytic literature but is widely remembered for her book about the famed Anna Freud who studied children, like Rose, who had been evacuated during the London Blitz. Welsh's review of Edgcumbe's book about Anna says,

"During the war, Anna Freud worked in war nurseries. The separation of children from their parents and their subsequent searching for alternative parents in the nurses provided fertile ground for understanding defense mechanisms, one of the pillars of her theory."

Anna Freud, who was previously an early childhood teacher, believed that child analysis was centered on the child's education. According to Morris, that notion was explored by Edgcumbe, noting,

"Edgcumbe captures the slippery slope between psychoanalysis and education. Is psychoanalysis a form of education? Or are these incompatible aims for child analysis? Recall that Anna Freud felt that children could not be psychoanalyzed as if they were adults. But children could be educated. Yet one wonders how education can be psychoanalytic."

Welsh concludes her book review saying:

"Rose Edgcumbe makes a powerful case for a more sophisticated understanding of the uniqueness of Anna Freud's theory and technique, and the contributions it offers for child psychoanalysis."

=== Later years ===
In the 1980s, to assist "a new post-Soviet approach to psychoanalysis," Edgcumbe helped build an alliance between the analysts at the Hampstead Clinic and their counterparts in Saint Petersburg, The exchange of learning and clinicians continued for many years after her death.

In May 1990, she married Peter Theobald. She died 22 August 2001.

== Memberships ==
Edgcumbe was a member of the Association of Child Psychotherapists and the British Psychoanalytic Society.

== Selected works ==
Edgcumbe published a number of "ground-breaking papers on the theory and practice of child analysis."

- Edgcumbe, R. M. (1971). "A consideration of the meaning of certain types of aggressive behaviour". The British Journal of Medical Psychology. 44 (4): 373–8. doi:10.1111/j.2044-8341.1971.tb02182.x. PMID 5132959.
- Edgcumbe, R.; Sandler, J. (1974). "Some comments on "Aggression turned against the self", a brief communication". The International Journal of Psycho-Analysis. 55 (3): 365–7. PMID 4448600.
- Edgcumbe, R.; Burgner, M. (1975). "The phallic-narcissistic phase: A differentiation between preoedipal and oedipal aspects of phallic development". The Psychoanalytic Study of the Child. 30: 161–80. doi:10.1080/00797308.1975.11823304. PMID 1197506.
- Edgcumbe, R.; Lundberg, S.; Markowitz, R.; Salo, F. (1976). "Some comments on the concept of the negative oedipal phase in girls". The Psychoanalytic Study of the Child. 31: 35–61. doi:10.1080/00797308.1976.11822308. PMID 981446.
- Edgcumbe, R. M. (1981). "Toward a developmental line for the acquisition of language". The Psychoanalytic Study of the Child. 36: 71–103. doi:10.1080/00797308.1981.11823331. PMID 7302038.
- Edgcumbe, R. (1983). "Anna Freud - child analyst". The International Journal of Psycho-Analysis. 64 (4): 427–33. PMID 6384094.
- Edgcumbe, R. M. (1984). "Modes of communication: The differentiation of somatic and verbal expression". The Psychoanalytic Study of the Child. 39: 137–54. doi:10.1080/00797308.1984.11823423. PMID 6514887.
- Edgcumbe, Rose (1988). "Five Lectures on Symbolization, Thinking and Affect". Bulletin of the Anna Freud Centre. 11 (1): 15–52.
- Fonagy, P.; Moran, G. S.; Edgcumbe, R.; Kennedy, H.; Target, M. (1993). "The roles of mental representations and mental processes in therapeutic action". The Psychoanalytic Study of the Child. 48: 9–48. doi:10.1080/00797308.1993.11822377. PMID 8234562.
- Edgcumbe, Rose (2000). Anna Freud: a view of development, disturbance and therapeutic techniques. London: Routledge. ISBN 978-0415101998.
