= Roger Daley =

British meteorologist

- Born: Roger Willis Daley; January 25, 1943; Purley, England
- Died: August 29, 2001 (aged 58); Carmel Valley, California, US
- Occupation: Meteorologist

Roger Willis Daley (January 25, 1943 – August 29, 2001) was a British meteorologist known particularly for his work on data assimilation.

== Early life ==
Daley was born in Purley, England on January 25, 1943, but moved with his parents to Canada at an early age. He studied at the University of British Columbia as an undergraduate and completed PhD studies at McGill University in 1971 where he was the student of Phil Merilees (Superintendent of NRL Marine Meteorology Division, 1997–2002).

== Career ==
After 2 years as a postdoc in Denmark, Daley took a position at the numerical weather prediction research center in Montreal where he was instrumental in the development of the first operational weather model (implemented in 1976) based on the spectral transform method for the globe. This method is now the standard in most operational centers around the world, including the Navy's Fleet Numerical Meteorological and Oceanographic Center (FNMOC) in Monterey.

In 1977, Daley accepted a position at the National Center for Atmospheric Research (NCAR) in Boulder, Colorado, where he carried out research on non-linear normal mode initialization and other outstanding problems in the dynamics of large-scale atmospheric flow particularly as they related to global numerical weather prediction. He also became much more interested in the science of data assimilation. During this period, Daley was author or co-author on many publications in the refereed literature and was honored by receiving the NCAR outstanding publication award. Nevertheless, he did not neglect his interest in operational applications. He was involved in implementation of non-linear normal mode initialization for baroclinic models at the Canadian Meteorological Centre in Canada and at Météo-France in Paris; and he implemented an innovative error covariance formulation at the European Centre for Medium-Range Weather Forecasts in the United Kingdom.

From 1985 until 1995, Daley held a position of Senior Scientist with the Meteorological Service of Canada in Toronto. His personal scientific work concentrated on the writing of a book entitled Atmospheric Data Assimilation, which was published in 1991. By the time he left Canada in 1995, he was firmly established as a world leader in data assimilation not only through his comprehensive book but also in terms of creative new developments in the theory and practice of data assimilation. Daley was largely responsible for elevating data assimilation to be a prestigious field of scientific enquiry.

Throughout his career, Daley was in demand as a consultant, as a scientific visitor and adjunct professor. He held visiting appointments at ECMWF; Météo-France; Florida State University and The Meteorological Institute of Stockholm University. He was an adjunct professor at McGill University, Colorado State University and the Naval Postgraduate School and a Scientist Emeritus with the Meteorological Service of Canada. He also lectured extensively throughout the world including a series of lectures in Beijing, China; as a principal lecturer at the 1990 Summer Colloquium at NCAR and at the University of Toulon in France. He served on many important international scientific committees, carrying out scientific reviews and serving as member of journal editorial boards of the AMS and the Swedish Geophysical Society. He was Chief Editor for the CMOS journal Atmosphere-Ocean from 1989 to 1992. Daley received many honors during his career. From the Canadian Meteorological and Oceanographic Society (CMOS) he received the Prize in Applied Meteorology in 1975 and the President's Prize in 1982. He was elected a Fellow of the Royal Society of Canada in 1993 and a Fellow of the American Meteorological Society (AMS) in 1997.

In 1995, Daley accepted a position as a UCAR Distinguished Scientific Visitor at the Marine Meteorology Division, Naval Research Laboratory, in Monterey, California, and moved his family to the Carmel Valley. Daley took on a project, in close partnership with Ed Barker, to design and construct a three-dimensional variational data assimilation system specifically meant to serve the needs of the US Navy. Over a period of 5 years, he and Ed have carefully built and tested this system. It is known as the NRL Atmospheric Variational Data Assimilation System, or NAVDAS, and went operational at FNMOC and at Navy regional METOC centers in 2003. NAVDAS is designed to meet data assimilation needs of both global models and regional nested models and holds great promise to provide a substantial increase in Navy model prediction accuracy.

In January 2001, the American Meteorological Society recognized Daley's achievements by awarding him the prestigious Jule Charney Medal for a lifetime of outstanding scientific achievement. NASA's Goddard Space Flight Center also recognized Daley's achievements by naming their new SGI Origin 3800 supercomputer after him. This 512-processor computer went into service at Goddard's Data Assimilation Office in 2001 to create significantly improved models of how the Earth's climate works.

== Death ==
Daley died at his home in Carmel Valley, California on August 29, 2001.
