= 2001 in British television =

This is a list of British television related events from 2001.

== Events ==
=== January ===
- 1 January – The BBC reality show Castaway 2000 comes to an end as its participants leave the island of Taransay.
- 4 January – The children's characters Bill and Ben return to television with a brand new stop-motion animated series on BBC One. The series features the voice of comedian and Cold Feet actor John Thomson.
- 7 January – Blankety Blank makes its debut on ITV, hosted by Lily Savage.
- 8 January – Debut of GMTV's Inch-Loss Island where volunteers attend a Castaway-style location in an attempt to collectively lose weight.
- 10 January – Debut of ITV's Popstars which will follow efforts to put together a five-piece band who will then record and release a single.
- 12 January – The Mole debuts on Channel 5, based on an idea from Belgium, the series sees ten contestants complete a number of tasks as they are whittled down to an eventual winner who will win £200,000. However, one of the contestants is a mole, deliberately planted to work against the team.
- 12 January – Johnny Vaughan and Denise van Outen end their second stint as presenters of The Big Breakfast, exactly 5 years after former presenter Gaby Roslin left the series. The show will be relaunched with a team of five presenters from 22 January as producers attempt to reverse the programme's falling ratings.
- 13 January – Debut of the ten-part BBC Two series I Love the '80s which examines the pop culture of the 1980s. The series debuts with I Love 1980 and concludes on 24 March with I Love 1989.
- 15 January
  - The ITC clears Celador and ITV of allegations that Judith Keppel's win on Who Wants to Be a Millionaire? had been rigged to draw audiences away from BBC One.
  - Carlton Television is criticised by the Independent Television Commission after the word "punami", popularised by comedian Sacha Baron Cohen was shown onscreen prior to an item about his alter ego, Ali G on its daytime show Celebrity TV in October 2000. The Commission felt the slang term for a part of the female anatomy would be offensive to the Afro-Caribbean community.
  - A new Jim Henson co-production called The Hoobs debuts on Channel 4 with early-morning repeats until 2014.
- 17 January
  - Prime Minister Tony Blair rejects calls to take part in US-style televised debates with opposition politicians during the forthcoming election campaign.
  - Vanessa Feltz has been dropped by the BBC following the conclusion of her two-year contract with the corporation, it is reported.
- 18 January – Channel 4 launches E4, a digital entertainment channel at 8:15pm.
- 19 January – The ITV Nightly News is shown on ITV for the last time after 2 years.
- 20 January – BBC Two airs live coverage of the inauguration of George W. Bush as the 43rd President of the United States.
- 22 January
  - News at Ten returns to ITV, having been axed 2 years earlier. It is once again presented by Trevor McDonald.
  - Footballer turned presenter Ian Wright signs a two-year contract with the BBC where he will front a number of shows, including replacing Ant & Dec as host of the game show Friends Like These.
  - Channel 4's The Big Breakfast is relaunched with Donna Air, Amanda Byram, Paul Tonkinson, Melanie Sykes and Richard Bacon as its main presenters.
- 26 January – Channel 5 airs the 1000th episode of its soap Family Affairs.
- 28 January – Carlton and Granada are holding discussions aimed at merging their internet operations to create a single online business for ITV under the brand itv.co.uk or itv.com. The current itv.co.uk is a basic information service, but the broadcasters wish to compete with the BBC.

=== February ===
- 1 February – Launch of the film channel The Studio, a joint venture between NTL and Vivendi Universal.
- 3 February – Danny Foster, Myleene Klass, Kym Marsh, Suzanne Shaw and Noel Sullivan are chosen as the winners of Popstars, an ITV series that sought to put together a five-member pop group from members of the public who were invited to audition for the series.
- 5 February – Four programmes aired on this day by E4, Popworld, North Hollywood High, Shipwrecked and Generation E are recorded as having a zero audience share by the Broadcasters' Audience Research Board's overnight viewing figures.
- 6 February – Mr. Bean: The Animated Series, an animated spinoff from Mr. Bean, is announced and would begin airing in March 2002.
- 8 February – A 1982 interview given by serial killer Dr. Harold Shipman to ITV's World in Action in which he speaks about the benefits of caring for patients in the community rather than hospitalising them is rebroadcast as part of the Tonight programme. The footage is shown as police continue an investigation to determine the number of people killed by the GP.
- 12 February – The Independent Television Commission reprimands Channel 4 for airing part of a World Wrestling Federation in October 2000 that featured a wrestler threatening a rival's assistant with a sledgehammer. The ITC deemed the scene was inappropriate when children could be watching. Also, a viewer's complaint of impartiality is upheld against an edition of Fifteen to One in which presenter William G. Stewart made a lengthy argument for returning the Elgin Marbles to Greece, but did not explore the opposing case.
- 14 February – On Valentine's Day, ITV's This Morning features a gay wedding as two men are "married" live on air. The ceremony, a blessing performed by a cleric from the Society for Independent Christian Ministry, is not recognised under UK law at the time when same-sex marriage is not legal in the UK. The segment results in 117 viewer complaints to the Independent Television Commission, many suggesting it was unsuitable for broadcast at a time when children could have been watching and undermined the religious significance of marriage. In response, Granada Television says that the ceremony was discussed at length at the beginning of the programme, meaning viewers would have been aware it was going to take place. The ITC subsequently rejects the complaints, but notes that due to the show's "drop in" nature offence may have been caused to those who did not see the start of the programme.
- 16 February – The Midlands-based talk show Central Weekend issues an onscreen apology after a complaint was made to the Independent Television Commission when it emerged that an edition of the show from July 2000 had featured fake guests. A debate on the effects of soap operas on the lives of individuals had featured two patients of a "soap clinic" who it later emerged had been fakes.
- 20 February – The network television premiere of Paul Verhoeven's 1997 American science-fiction action blockbuster Starship Troopers on Channel 5, starring Casper Van Dien, Denise Richards, Dina Meyer, Michael Ironside Jake Busey and Neil Patrick Harris.
- 24 February – Hear'Say, the band formed by ITV's Popstars make their singing debut on the channel's chart show CD:UK. They had been required to mime during a previous performance recorded for Channel 5's The Pepsi Chart Show because their backing tapes had not been completed.

=== March ===
- 1 March
  - The current foot-and-mouth outbreak has required rural-based soaps and continuing dramas such as Emmerdale and Heartbeat to adjust their filming schedules, it is reported.
  - EastEnders character Phil Mitchell (played by Steve McFadden) is wounded by a mystery gunman on his doorstep in one of the most memorable TV storylines of the year. The episode is watched by 17 million viewers.
  - BBC One airs Sailing through Heaven and Hell, a documentary chronicling Ellen MacArthur's participation in the 2000–2001 Vendée Globe solo round-the-world sailing race.
- 2 March – The Guardian reports that ITV have signed a deal with Universal Studios to air episodes of Northern Exposure, The Incredible Hulk and Dr. Katz. Northern Exposure which aired on Channel 4 during the 1990s, will begin showing nightly from 5 March, following The Late Show with David Letterman, while Dr. Katz will air on Saturdays.
- 4 March – A bomb explodes outside BBC Television Centre. The blast is later attributed to dissident Irish Republican terrorists and it is suggested the BBC Panorama programme which named individuals as participants in the Omagh bombing was the motive.
- 5 March
  - Anne Robinson appears as a guest on an edition of BBC Two's Room 101 in which she nominates Welsh people for inclusion in the fictional Orwellian Room 101, describing them as "irritating and annoying". Her comments provoke fury among Welsh politicians, an invitation to appear before the Welsh Affairs Select Committee as part of their investigation into Wales's overseas image and an investigation into the incident by the BBC Board of Governors. In addition, 427 complaints are received by the Broadcasting Standards Commission and North Wales Police launch an investigation into allegations of racial hatred.
  - The ITV soap Crossroads returns with a new series after an absence of 13 years. Response is initially favourable, but the show is soon criticised for its confusing storylines.
- 6 March – Shopping channel Ideal World goes off the air temporarily due to a large fire at its facilities in Peterborough. The channel would go back on the air within weeks of the fire, broadcasting from temporary facilities, but its main facilities in Peterborough would not be fully operational until September 2002.
- 7 March – BBC Two airs a special edition of TOTP2 in which Lionel Richie talks about his life and career and performs some of his hits.
- 9 March
  - The first series of Celebrity Big Brother sees six celebrities enter the Big Brother 1 house for a week-long series, in aid of Comic Relief. As Comic Relief is shown by the BBC this is a rare collaboration between two rival television networks. While Channel 4 airs daily highlight shows, BBC One also broadcasts 10-minute updates, as well as the final which is part of the Red Nose Day telethon.
  - Zi Khan wins the first series of Channel 5's The Mole.
- 11 March
  - ITV airs the 5000th episode of Coronation Street.
  - Channel 5 signs a deal with the distributors of Gladiator to give the film its British terrestrial television debut in 2003.
- 13 March
  - In an interview with the Radio Times, film director Ken Loach launches a scathing attack on the "destruction" of some of UK television's long-established news and current affairs programmes. In particular, he describes ITV's decision to scrap World in Action as "one of the television crimes of the century".
  - London's Chief Fire Officer Brian Robinson criticises the BBC for "grossly irresponsible behaviour" after the day's episode of EastEnders shows a character breaking a smoke alarm with a broom handle after it was activated in a smoke-filled kitchen.
- 14 March
  - ITV signs a £100 million deal with Luxembourg-based SES, the company that relays BSkyB channels in the United Kingdom to make its service available through the Astra satellite. The deal paves the way for negotiations with Sky to carry ITV as part of its digital satellite service. A deal between the two broadcasters is subsequently agreed on 18 November.
  - Channel 5 airs its first terrestrial television showing of Robert Kurtzman's 1997 American fantasy horror film Wishmaster, starring Tammy Lauren, Andrew Divoff and Ted Raimi, as well as the three slasher icons include A Nightmare on Elm Street's Robert Englund, Friday the 13th's Kane Hodder and Candyman's Tony Todd.
- 16 March
  - Highlights of the 2001 Comic Relief telethon include a prerecorded piece in which David and Victoria Beckham are interviewed by the character Ali G.
  - Comedian Jack Dee is voted the winner of Celebrity Big Brother.
- 17 March – William Friedkin's controversial 1973 Oscar-winning supernatural horror film The Exorcist is shown on British television for the first time when it is screened by Channel 4.
- 18 March – Hear'Say reach number one in the UK singles chart with their debut single "Pure and Simple". With sales of almost 550,000, the song enters the record books as Britain's most successful debut pop single. They also become the first British group to simultaneously top both the UK singles and album charts with a debut release when their album Popstars reaches number one on the album charts on 1 April.
- 22 March – A new television website called TV Whirl is launched.
- 23 March – The Mirror reports that Brookside actress Claire Sweeney has been offered the presenting role of a new ITV series, Challenge of a Lifetime, described as a spin-off of Don't Try This at Home, after impressing producers during her recent Celebrity Big Brother appearance. London Weekend Television confirms in April that Sweeney will front a 12-part series of the show.
- 28 March – Channel 5 attracts its largest audience to date as 5.5 million viewers tune in to watch the World Cup qualifier match between England and Albania.
- 30 March – Channel 5 celebrates its fourth birthday.

=== April ===
- 2 April
  - Imperial College London wins the 2000–01 series of University Challenge, beating St John's College, Oxford 250–195.
  - ITV launches an online version of Who Wants to Be a Millionaire?.
- 5 April – The culmination of the Who Shot Phil? storyline in EastEnders with the revelation that Phil Mitchell (played by Steve McFadden) was shot by Lisa Fowler (Lucy Benjamin). To make way for the 45-minute episode in the schedules, the BBC negotiated to have the kick-off of the UEFA Cup semi final between Liverpool and Barcelona delayed by fifteen minutes. The episode receives 20.05 million viewers, the highest rated EastEnders episode of the decade.
- 6 April – The Big Breakfast co-presenter Paul Tomkinson has been sacked from the show, it is reported, bosses having told him of their decision to let him go the previous day. His role on the morning's edition of the programme is filled by Mike McClean.
- 11 April – The Independent Television Commission turns down a request from Channel 5 to move its main evening news bulletin forward half an hour to 5:30pm. However, an extended Five News and Talk planned for the run-up to the general election beginning at 5:30pm is given the go-ahead.
- 16 April – The Broadcasting Standards Commission rules that Anne Robinson's comments about Welsh people "came close to the boundaries of acceptability", but fell short of being racist.
- 17 April – The Press Complaints Commission upholds a complaint against the News of the World made by Granada Television after the newspaper sent two undercover journalists to a Christmas party for the cast and crew of Emmerdale in the hope of finding a story. The assignment had proved to be fruitless because the reporters were ejected when their identity was discovered.
- 20 April
  - Celador Productions, makers of Who Wants to Be a Millionaire?, is awarded the Queen's Award for Enterprise for selling the ITV game show to over 60 countries worldwide.
  - Channel 4 scraps Right to Reply. The programme had been on air since the launch of the channel in 1982 and was the only programme that Channel 4 produced in-house.
- 21 April – David Edwards, a schoolteacher from Staffordshire and former Mastermind winner, becomes the second person to win the £1 million prize on ITV's Who Wants to Be a Millionaire?. News of his win has leaked out before the episode is transmitted.
- 24 April
  - Eric Richard makes his final appearance as Sergeant Bob Cryer in The Bill.
  - A little over a year after it began airing US soap Days of Our Lives, Channel 5 announces that the series will disappear from its schedules from the following day, an audience of 200,000 deemed not to be high enough for the timeslot in which it has been shown.
- 25 April – Carlton and Granada announce proposals to align their television and internet assets under the ITV banner. itv.co.uk will also relaunch as itv.com, allowing ITV to compete with the BBC for online users.
- 26 April – On the second anniversary of the murder of Jill Dando, the Jill Dando Institute, a teaching and research facility dedicated to crime science, is established at University College London.
- 27 April – Channel 4 game show Countdown celebrates its 3000th edition.

=== May ===
- 3 May – Kevin Lygo, head of music and entertainment at Channel 4, is to move to Channel 5 where he will become director of programming.
- 4 May – The BBC announces the closure of the loss-making BBC Experience.
- 7 May – The Guardian reports that BSkyB is planning to close its interactive shopping service Open after buying out the other partners in their parent company, British Interactive Broadcasting.
- 12 May
  - Tanel Padar, Dave Benton and 2XL win the 2001 Eurovision Song Contest (staged in Copenhagen) for Estonia with the song "Everybody".
  - ITV broadcasts the first episode of Slap Bang presented by Ant & Dec which is regarded as a prime time version of their Saturday morning show SMTV Live. The programme is not successful, and is not recommissioned following its initial six week run.
- 14 May – Channel 4 confirms that Donna Air has left The Big Breakfast. The show will now be presented by Richard Bacon and Amanda Byram, alongside various guest hosts.
- 15 May
  - The online version of Who Wants to Be a Millionaire? has made the ITV website the 48th most popular in the UK according to Nielsen, with half a million visits during April.
  - The Smash Hits TV channel is launched.
- 16 May
  - BBC Two airs a special edition of TOTP2 featuring performances by Billy Joel.
  - Ask Tony Blair, an election debate chaired by Jonathan Dimbleby, is aired on ITV.
- 17 May
  - BBC One airs a Question Time election special from Newcastle with Liberal Democrat leader Charles Kennedy.
  - Channel 5 have signed an £18m deal with Columbia Tristar International which will see the channel premiere the studio's films from 2000, including Erin Brockovich.
- 19 May – Match of the Day is shown on Saturday night on BBC One for the final time, following the loss of the BBC's rights to broadcast highlights from the FA Premiership. The programme is reformatted the following season as a brand name for its live coverage of the FA Cup, UEFA Cup, and England international football. The BBC would eventually regain the rights to Premiership highlights in 2004.
- 20 May – ITV airs the final episode of the thirteenth series of London's Burning. This is the last series to be aired with a hiatus.
- 21 May – The UK version of Survivor debuts on ITV.
- 22 May – Actors from the Australian soap Home and Away will fly to the UK to record episodes in London to coincide with the show's return to British TV, it is confirmed. The series will make its Channel 5 debut on Monday 16 July.
- 23 May
  - BBC One airs a Question Time election special from Manchester with Conservative leader William Hague.
  - ITV airs Ask Charles Kennedy, an election debate chaired by Jonathan Dimbleby.
- 24 May – Letitia Dean returns to EastEnders as Sharon Watts, having last appeared in 1995.
- 25 May – When singer Elton John pulls out of appearing on Have I Got News for You at the last minute, he is replaced by taxi driver Ray Johnson, credited as 'Ray Elton John Son' who works as a lookalike. However, Johnson is introduced to the audience as the genuine Elton John and keeps silent for the whole recording. On-screen captions between rounds provide the only clues to the deception.
- 30 May
  - BBC One airs a Question Time election special from Milton Keynes with Prime Minister and Labour Party leader Tony Blair.
  - ITV airs Ask William Hague, an election debate chaired by Jonathan Dimbleby.

=== June ===
- 7 June – Nestlé has signed a sponsorship with Carlton Cinema to sponsor the Heroes Season.
- 7–8 June – Coverage of the 2001 General Election is shown on television. The election sees the Labour Party attain a second successive general election victory.
- 8 June – Tessa Jowell is appointed as Culture Secretary in a post-election Cabinet reshuffle, replacing Chris Smith.
- 9 June
  - ITV screens an edited version of The Dam Busters in which all references to Commander Guy Gibson's dog, Nigger have been removed, leading to criticism from the anti-censorship group Index on Censorship who argue the cuts were "unnecessary and ridiculous" as the dog is an important part of the story. It is the second time the film has been aired with the cuts, it having originally been shown by the network in December 1999. ITV attributes the cuts to a London Weekend Television employee who did not seek approval before editing the film.
  - The BBC's National Lottery game show Winning Lines returns for its third series, in which Phillip Schofield replaces Simon Mayo as host.
- 11 June
  - British pop group Atomic Kitten will make a cameo appearance in Home and Away episodes to be filmed in London, it is confirmed. The storyline will feature Donald Fisher bringing his family to the UK.
  - Due to poor ratings, from this day weekly episodes of Survivor are reduced from two to one, airing on Mondays at 9pm.
- 19 June – Channel 4 announces plans to axe The Big Breakfast in early 2002, but signal their willingness to extend the series if suitable proposals to rework the programme are developed.
- 20 June – The Queen's Speech to the new session of parliament includes plans to legislate for the creation of Ofcom, a new media regulator to replace several existing authorities. The body is conceived as a "super-regulator" to oversee media channels that are rapidly converging through digital transmission and its introduction will see the largest shakeup in the British media since the Broadcasting Act 1990.
- 23 June – Late Night with Jerry Springer returns to Channel 5 for a ten-week run, with guests on the opening show including Hear'Say. Other guests to appear in this series include Emma Bunton, Atomic Kitten, Wyclef Jean, Clive James, Antony Worrall Thompson, Ron Atkinson, Sally Lindsay, Pat Cash and Victoria Beckham. The programme attracts some comment following a report about remarks made by Beckham about Geri Halliwell and Alex Ferguson in an interview recorded for the show's 24 August edition.
- 25 June
  - The BBC introduces its new interactive television service for the Wimbledon tennis tournament, allowing viewers to select from a choice of up to four matches at any one time in addition to the linear coverage across both BBC One and BBC Two.
  - ITV gameshow The People Versus returns for a second series, with Kaye Adams taking over as host. The show now airs in a weekday teatime slot, and viewers can now stand to win up to £1,000 for submitting a question that the studio contestant answers incorrectly, rather than take over their place on the show as had been the case in the first series.
- 28 June – Wish You Were Here...? presenter Mary Nightingale announces she is stepping down from the role after two years to spend more time with her family.
- 29 June – S4C's Chwaraeon/Sport 2000 promotional video has won three silver awards in the "Best In-House Promo" at the world Promax Awards ceremony in Miami, Florida.
- 30 June – A power failure at the BBC Television Centre knocks out all BBC television broadcasts for around 20 minutes.
- Cartoon Network shut down all its analogue signals to move to Telewest, Cable, NTL, Sky Digital and ON Digital.

=== July ===
- 3 July – Rosa Baden-Powell wins the 2001 series of MasterChef.
- 4 July – Stanley Kubrick's controversial 1971 film A Clockwork Orange makes its British television debut through Sky Box Office.
- 9 July – The first episode of the sitcom The Office is broadcast on BBC Two, starring Ricky Gervais.
- 11 July – ONdigital is rebranded ITV Digital.
- 12 July – Richard Madeley and Judy Finnigan host their final edition of This Morning, 13 years after the show launched, having previously announced their intention to leave the series. They have been approached by Channel 4 to host a similar show which will begin in the Autumn.
- 14 July – Emma Wilkinson, performing as Dusty Springfield, wins the thirteenth series of Stars in Their Eyes.
- 16 July
  - The Australian soap Home and Away makes its debut on Channel 5.
  - A one-minute news summary called 60 Seconds launches on BBC Choice.
- 21 July – ITV airs a one-off junior edition of Stars in Their Eyes. The episode is aired again in August 2002 as the first edition of an expanded junior series. The episode is won by Lewis Devine performing as Donny Osmond.
- 25 July – Charlotte Hobrough, a 25-year-old Detective Constable from Cardiff, wins the first UK series of Survivor and the show's £1million prize money.
- 26 July
  - Martin Kemp, who plays Steve Owen in EastEnders will leave the soap after signing a two-year contract with ITV, it is reported. He will depart from the series in March 2002 when his contract with the soap expires.
  - Channel 4 airs the controversial one-off special of the spoof documentary series Brass Eye which features celebrities endorsing a fake anti-paedophile campaign. The programme, presented by Chris Morris attracts more than 1,000 complaints to Channel 4 by the following day and a further 500 to the ITC. Both the ITC and Broadcasting Standards Commission launch investigations into the show. Despite the controversy caused by its broadcast, the episode is shown again in the early hours of 28 July, while Channel 4 defends its decision to show the programme, saying it makes a serious point about the media's sensational treatment of paedophilia.
- 27 July
  - London Weekend Television has been fined £100,000 by the Independent Television Commission for breaching rules on sponsorship and product placement in its series Club@vision which had charged nightclubs fees to be included in the programme.
  - The US series Will & Grace, the country's first primetime gay sitcom, makes its British television debut on Channel 4.
  - Brian Dowling, an air steward from Ireland, wins the second series of Big Brother.
  - S2 closes after two years on air. It is initially replaced by the ITV Sport Channel then later ITV2.
- 28 July – Former Spice Girl Melanie Brown makes her television presenting debut as the host of ITV's This is My Moment which returns for a full series. The programme performs poorly in the ratings and is axed in February 2002.
- 29 July – The BBC announces plans for The Saturday Show, a new Saturday morning entertainment programme to replace Live & Kicking. Dani Behr, former host of Channel 4's The Word and Joe Mace who presents the BBC's TOTP Plus are subsequently chosen as its presenters.
- 30 July – After watching the spoof Brass Eye documentary about paedophiles, Culture Secretary Tessa Jowell asks the Independent Television Commission to change its procedures so it can rule more swiftly on similar programmes in future.
- 31 July – The hit sitcom Small Potatoes returns to Channel 4 for a second series.

=== August ===
- 9 August – Lecturers at Teesside University have claimed that the raft of detective dramas on television has led to a surge of interest in a new course teaching forensic investigation and crime scene science offered by the university.
- 10 August – The BBC introduces a fourth weekly episode of EastEnders, to be broadcast on Fridays at 8pm. This causes some controversy as the first episode clashes with Coronation Street which has been moved to 8pm to make way for an hour-long episode of Emmerdale at 7pm. In this first head-to-head battle, EastEnders claims victory over its rival.
- 11 August – ITV in England and Wales changes its name to ITV1, due to the growing number of other ITV services, including ITV2, ITV Digital and the ITV Sport Channel which launches on the same day. The ITV1 name is used until 2013, but returns in 2022.
- 15 August
  - Unveiling its Autumn schedule, the BBC announces that the ten-part World War II drama, Band of Brothers will air on BBC Two, instead of BBC One as originally planned. The broadcaster says the decision to move the series is to allow "an uninterrupted 10-week run" and not because it was considered not to be mainstream enough.
  - Ruth England is named as the new presenter of Wish You Were Here...?, replacing Mary Nightingale.
- 16 August – Former model Twiggy (Lawson) and 70s pop singer Coleen Nolan are chosen to take over from Richard Madeley and Judy Finnigan as presenters of This Morning. They will host the show on a rotation basis with Fern Britton and John Leslie.
- 18 August
  - ITV1's The Premiership goes on air with much fanfare at 7pm. ITV had won the television rights to show FA Premier League highlights the previous year and had decided to air the show at a time when they thought that football fans and family alike could watch it together. A later edition of the show goes out at 11pm, providing extended highlights. The hugely controversial move proves unpopular with viewers, and the following week ITV suffers their worst Saturday night ratings for five years. After two months, figures have not greatly improved and in October the early evening slot is deemed to have been a failure and was axed.
  - Debut of the ten-part BBC Two series I Love the '90s which examines the pop culture of the 1990s. The series begins with I Love 1990 and concludes on 3 November with I Love 1999.
- 19 August – ITV1 broadcasts Beech on the Run, a 90-minute special of The Bill filmed in Sydney, Australia and featuring the return of Don Beech (played by Billy Murray). The episode is a precursor to a full series featuring Beech and titled Beech is Back.
- 22 August – Pay-per-view service ONrequest rebrands as ITV Select.
- 24 August – A special edition of the BBC One garden makeover programme Ground Force sees Alan Titchmarsh, Charlie Dimmock and Tommy Walsh design and create a memorial garden for Jill Dando in her home town of Weston-super-Mare.
- 29 August – American illusionist David Blaine appears on GMTV where he is interviewed by presenter Eamonn Holmes, but refuses to speak and instead gives him the "evil eye". Holmes has subsequently cited this interview as the most awkward moment of his professional career.
- 30 August – ITV1 will reduce its number of weekly episodes of Crossroads from five to four, dropping its Friday episode from the week beginning 10 September. The move is to make way for a new interactive game show, The Biggest Game in Town which will air on Fridays and also be part of the channel's daily lunchtime schedule.
- 31 August – After a five-year break, the hit sitcom Absolutely Fabulous returns for a full series on BBC One.

=== September ===
- 1 September – Northern Ireland air stewardess Ellie Barr wins the final edition of ITV1's This Is My Moment and a £135,000 prize, after impressing viewers with her rendition of Ralph McTell's "Streets of London".
- 2 September – .tv, formerly The Computer Channel, closes down due to low ratings.
- 3 September
  - Kent and Sussex get their own news programme, BBC South East Today.
  - Twiggy (Lawson) and Coleen Nolan make their debut as replacements for Richard Madeley and Judy Finnigan as presenters of the This Morning. Overnight viewing figures published the following day suggest the show had an audience of 1 million.
  - ITV1 debuts Soapstars, the broadcaster's latest reality series. It sees members of the public auditioning to become one of five new characters in Emmerdale.
- 5 September – The actors' union Equity criticises ITV1's Soapstars as demeaning to its members.
- 6 September
  - Stars from The Royle Family and Coronation Street help to launch Excuses Kill – Get a Smoke Alarm, a government campaign to fit smoke alarms.
  - The Independent Television Commission orders Channel 4 to broadcast an apology over the controversial special edition of satirical series Brass Eye that featured celebrities giving their backing to a spoof anti-paedophilia campaign and attracted a raft of complaints from viewers. The ITC rules that Channel 4 breached the guidelines by failing to give sufficient warning about the programme's nature and not doing enough to avoid causing "gratuitous offence". The ITC's findings are supported by the Broadcasting Standards Commission.
- 10 September
  - The BBC unveils more details of The Saturday Show which will compete with ITV1's SMTV Live by having a more grown-up feel to it.
  - During a recording of the ITV game show Who Wants to Be a Millionaire?, contestant Charles Ingram wins the £1,000,000 prize. However, the payout is later suspended when he is accused of cheating by having his wife, Diana and an accomplice, Tecwen Whittock, cough when host Chris Tarrant read out the correct answers.
- 11 September
  - British viewers witness a terrorist attack on the United States and the collapse of the Twin Towers in New York City, live on television. BBC One simulcasts BBC News 24's coverage immediately after the lunchtime showing of Neighbours, cancelling Diagnosis: Murder and a repeat of Birds of a Feather. Both afternoon and evening regional news magazines only runs for five minutes due to the news coverage. A news special replaces Holiday: You Call the Shots, while EastEnders and the season premiere of Changing Rooms airs as usual. A new episode of Murder Rooms: The Dark Beginnings of Sherlock Holmes is replaced by another news special, named America Under Siege, and presented by David Dimbleby, while the documentary series Brighton Bill and the film Fire in the Sky are also dropped, to make way for a repeat of the documentary series Boss Women. BBC One joins BBC News 24 one hour earlier than scheduled. In order to carry the CBBC programming block and the afternoon repeat of Neighbours, who were left over by BBC News 24 coverage on BBC One, BBC Two cancels Awash with Colour, Ready Steady Cook, and The Weakest Link. It also airs BBC News 24's news special while BBC One airs its normal programming, dropping as a result Star Trek: Voyager, Roswell High, a repeat of Bill Oddie Goes Wild and Food and Drink. In addition, the documentary Correspondent: Licence to Kill is replaced by an extended Newsnight. ITV1 made its first news report after the first part of Crossroads ended. The news coverage cancels a repeat of Catchphrase and sends the CITV programming block, The People Versus and the repeat of that day's episode of Crossroads to ITV2. Afternoon and evening local news and magazine programmes are dropped, while Emmerdale airs normally. Another news special replaces The Real Eastenders, with Who Wants to Be a Millionaire? airing in its normal time, while ITV News at Ten starts an hour early, (displacing The Bill) followed by delayed regional news and The Big Match. Nightime programming (The Web Review, another edition of The Big Match, World Sport, Nationwide Football League Extra, American Judge Judy and ITV Nightscreen) are all dropped, in favour of more news and a simulcast of NBC's coverage. Channel 4 is later criticised for its slow response after it continues showing the day's afternoon film That Hamilton Woman for over an hour after other networks have been covering the terrorist attacks.
  - ITV rejects claims that Twiggy has been demoted as the main presenter of This Morning after reports television insiders had criticised her presenting style as wooden. She will now take turns with Coleen Nolan anchoring the show alongside John Leslie.
- 12 September – Further changes are made to evening schedules on both BBC One and ITV1 in the aftermath of the 9/11 attacks. BBC One airs an hour long Six O'Clock News with regional news programmes following at 7pm. Two short news summaries are shown at 8pm and 8:55pm, inbetween The Weakest Link and The National Lottery Winning Lines whilst the first episode of The Blue Planet is aired as scheduled at 9pm. On ITV1, the Champions League match between Manchester United and Olympiacos is postponed by UEFA as a mark of respect, with the slot filled by that night's episode of Coronation Street being brought forward into its normal timeslot, followed by a repeat of It'll Be Alright on the Night before News at Ten is again extended and begins an hour early at 9pm.
- 13 September – An edition of the political debate show Question Time devoted to the political implications of the 9/11 attacks, features many contributions from members of the audience expressing strong anti-American views. The BBC receives more than 2,000 complaints in the show's aftermath and later apologises to viewers for causing offence, stating that the edition should not have been broadcast live, but rather should have been recorded and edited.
- 14 September – A national memorial service held at St Paul's Cathedral for the victims of the 11 September terrorist attacks. The service is broadcast on television on both BBC One (cancelling both Wipeout and Doctors, with Trading Up being replaced by a delayed Bargain Hunt) and ITV1 (dropping the lunchtime regional news magazines)
- 15 September – The BBC One Saturday morning magazine show Live & Kicking comes to an end after eight years. The final edition is presented by Sarah Cawood, Heather Suttie, Ortis Deley and Trey Farley.
- 17 September – Channel 4's The Big Breakfast is criticised by the Independent Television Commission after presenter Richard Bacon made jokes about Alzheimer's disease during a newspaper review of an article discussing a new vaccine against the illness.
- 21 September – BBC One and ITV airs a live feed of America: A Tribute to Heroes, a two-hour American telethon to raise money for the victims of the September 11 terrorist attacks. The event is repeated by BBC One on 23 September. The telethon raises $150m (£103m) which will be donated to the United Way's 11 September Fund.
- 22 September – Debut of The Saturday Show on BBC One, but with an audience of 800,000, the first edition fails to match the 1.9 million tuning into its ITV counterpart, SMTV Live.
- 24 September – The long-running Channel 4 game show Countdown starts its new 15-round format and 45-minute running time, its biggest change to its format since it first aired in 1982.
- 26 September – BBC Two airs a special edition of TOTP2, featuring a live concert from Elton John.
- 28 September – Granada Television's flagship nightly news programme Granada Tonight is rebranded to its original title Granada Reports.
- 29 September
  - Jason Hain, Dee Whitehead, Mark Jardine, Elspeth Brodie and Ruth Abram are announced as the winners of ITV1's Soapstars. They will play a new family in Emmerdale.
  - Former company director Robert Brydges becomes the third person ever to win £1 million on Who Wants to Be a Millionaire?. The edition including his win was recorded on 25 September and is broadcast on this day.
  - The final episode of Cilla's Moment of Truth is broadcast on ITV1. The programme is axed after a decline in ratings due to it being shown in an earlier timeslot because of The Premiership airing in its usual slot.
- 30 September – Twiggy is axed from This Morning because of falling ratings. ITV confirms on 2 October that she will not be seen on screen again, having presented her final show on 28 September.

=== October ===
- 1 October
  - BBC London is launched, replacing Newsroom South East.
  - Actors' union Equity denies reports in the Daily Star that its members have refused to work with the winners of ITV1's Soapstars.
  - Films such as A Bug's Life and Toy Story 2 will make their British television debut on the BBC after they signed a deal with Buena Vista International Television for the broadcast rights to several of its films.
- 2 October – With the following day's Channel 4 schedule including another showing of That Hamilton Woman, the film it was screening on the afternoon of 11 September, Mirror TV critic Jim Shelley uses his Shelley Vision column to criticise the channel's slow response to the 11 September terrorist attacks.
- 5 October
  - Tamzin Outhwaite bows out of EastEnders as Melanie Owen and will depart in April 2002.
  - The World War II epic Band of Brothers makes its UK television debut.
- 6 October
  - A Match of the Day special covering England's World Cup qualifier match against Greece is watched by 6.8 million viewers, gaining a 57.1% audience share and beating ITV1's Saturday afternoon lineup.
  - Challenge of a Lifetime debuts on ITV1.
  - The UK version of Pop Idol debuts on ITV1.
- 7 October – ITV1 airs Anybody's Nightmare, a dramatisation of the case of Sheila Bowler, a woman wrongly convicted of the murder of an aunt.
- 11 October – ITV's London Weekend Television says it is considering the future of one of its entertainers, Michael Barrymore, after he was cautioned by police for possession of cannabis and allowing it to be smoked at his home. The caution follows an investigation into the death of a 31-year-old man at a party at Barrymore's property earlier in the year. The broadcaster announces on 20 November that a new series of My Kind of Music has been commissioned for early 2002. But following an inquest into the death which records an open verdict, ITV announces in September 2002 that it will not be commissioning any more programmes from him. The case is reopened in December 2006 and Barrymore is subsequently questioned about the incident along with two other men, but the Crown Prosecution Service advises in September 2007 that nobody should be charged over the death.
- 14 October – An advert on the back pages of several Sunday newspapers appeals for potential participants for a new BBC series titled The Experiment which will attempt to recreate the controversial Stanford prison experiment of 1971, a psychological study that sought to study the effects of becoming a prisoner or prison guard on a group of students and which its creator had said should never be repeated because of the adverse effect on those who took part. In January 2002, it is reported that the project which had been due to last ten days, is finished early after the behaviour of those involved began to degenerate, a similar fate that befell the original experiment. However, psychologists say they have gathered a lot of useful data about the understanding of power and powerlessness.
- 30 October – Michael Barrymore speaks publicly for the first time about events preceding the death of a man at his home in an interview with journalist Martin Bashir for ITV1's Tonight with Trevor McDonald.

=== November ===
- 2 November – Jenny Richards, a young mother from Newport, Wales wins the first series of Channel 4's Model Behaviour. Her prize is a 12-month contract with Premier Model Management.
- 5 November
  - BBC 2W, a new digital channel for Wales, is launched.
  - Fern Britton returns to This Morning following her maternity leave and will alternate presenting it with John Leslie and Coleen Nolan. Her return leads to the programme's first increase in audience figures since the departure of Richard and Judy earlier in the year.
  - UK Food launches. Consequently, UK Style focusses on programming about the home.
- 6 November – Launch of ITV1's latest soap, Night and Day about the lives of six families living in a street in Greenwich. Three weekday episodes are aired on Tuesdays, Wednesdays and Thursdays, as well as a late night edited for adults version on Thursdays. The programme's theme tune, "Always & Forever", is sung by Kylie Minogue. The series is unusual for UK soaps in that it contains background music.
- 7 November – The soap family assembled by ITV1's reality series Soapstars make their debut in Emmerdale. Originally contracted to appear in the series for three months, their contract is extended by a further three months.
- 12 November
  - Figures released by the Independent Television Commission show a decline in the percentage of viewers watching ITV, down from 29.6% in 2000 to 28% in 2001. Audiences for BBC One and Channel 4 have also dropped, while BBC Two's audience share increased slightly.
  - The running time of ITV1's This Morning is reduced by 30 minutes, making it a 90-minute programme.
- 14 November
  - BBC Two announces that the current idents which have been in use since 1991 are to be axed and will be replaced by a new set of four computer generated idents on 19 November.
  - British terrestrial television premiere of the 1999 James Bond film The World Is Not Enough on ITV1, starring Pierce Brosnan, Sophie Marceau, Denise Richards and Robert Carlyle.
- 15 November – Debut of BBC One's Walking with Beasts, a six-part sequel to Walking with Dinosaurs that takes place after the extinction of the dinosaurs and recreates animals of the Cenozoic with computer-generated imagery and animatronics. The series concludes on 20 December.
- 16 November – The BBC's seven-hour Children in Need television fundraiser has so far raised nearly £13 million for charity.
- 17 November – The Premiership is moved from its original 7pm slot to a permanent later time of 10:30pm, with repeats shown early on Sunday mornings. The last 7pm show had aired the previous Saturday (10 November).
- 19 November
  - BBC Two introduces a new set of four computer generated idents at 7am, replacing the previous set of over 20, four of which dating back to 1991. ITV2 rebrands on the same day.
  - Helen O'Rahilly, a BBC producer and former Director of Television Production at RTÉ is appointed as the first Channels Executive for BBCi.
  - The BBC announces details of two forthcoming digital channels for children to be launched in Spring 2002. CBeebies will be aimed at preschool children, while CBBC will offer programming for a slightly older audience. The digital channels will have a budget of £40 million. The new channels would actually launch on 11 February 2002.
- 24 November – ITN reporter Andrea Catherwood is injured in the knee by shrapnel when a Taliban prisoner explodes a concealed grenade that kills himself and two other men close by. Catherwood was reporting from Mazari Sharif where she was watching captured Taliban prisoners disembarking from lorries.
- 26 November – Richard & Judy debuts on Channel 4.
- 27 November
  - The Independent Television Commission is investigating WHSmith's Christmas advertising campaign featuring a family of fat people from Newcastle upon Tyne after criticism and complaints that it is offensive to Geordies.
  - ITV dismisses media reports that its dilemma-based quiz show Shafted has been axed after three episodes. The programme, aired in the Monday night ITV1 schedule at 8:30pm is replaced by Who Wants to Be a Millionaire? because it was affecting audience figures for the drama Cold Feet which goes out afterwards, but an ITV spokeswoman says the show will return for an uninterrupted run in the channel's Winter schedule. The show did not return, however and in 2006 is included as one of the worst British television shows of the 2000s in the Penguin TV Companion.
- 29 November – ITV signs a £500,000 deal with Disneyland Paris for it to sponsor the broadcaster's New Year programming on 31 December and 1 January.

=== December ===
- 1 December
  - Ant & Dec present their final editions of SM:TV and CD:UK, having decided to leave the programmes to concentrate on developing their primetime television careers.
  - The Carlton channel Taste CFN closes after 5 years on the air.
- 8 December – The S Club 7 single "Don't Stop Movin'" is voted the 2001 Record of the Year by ITV viewers.
- 9 December
  - Footballer David Beckham is named as this year's BBC Sports Personality of the Year.
  - Chris Lintern wins the second series of The Mole.
- 12 December – BBC Director of Television Mark Thompson is named as the new Chief Executive of Channel 4, succeeding Michael Jackson in March 2002.
- 13 December – Lynette Lithgow, a 51-year-old former BBC newsreader, is found murdered with her mother and brother-in-law at the family home in Trinidad. Lester Pitman and Daniel Agard, the latter a relative of the family are subsequently charged and in July 2004 are sentenced to death by hanging after being convicted of the murders. A retrial is subsequently ordered for Agard, while Pitman's death sentence is later commuted to one of 40 years.
- 17 December
  - Former Culture Secretary Chris Smith has taken up a consultative role with Disney Television, his office confirms.
  - The original Top Gear airs for the last time. It is relaunched in its new format the following year.
  - Gullane Entertainment, the owners at this time of Thomas the Tank Engine, Sooty and Art Attack, purchases a majority stake in the Welsh children's series Fireman Sam for £16 million from S4C International. The deal allows for a new season of 26 episodes to be produced and a remaster of the first four series.
- 19 December – BSkyB has signed a deal with Channel 5 that will allow its breakfast show, Sky News Sunrise to be shown on the channel from 6am to 6:30am on weekdays and 7am to 8am at weekends. The programme will appear on Channel 5 from 7 January 2002 and will be the first time Sky News content has been seen on terrestrial television for a decade, the last time it was shown on terrestrial television was on the last few months of broadcasting of TV-am in 1992.
- 20 December – A joint venture between BSkyB and Princess Productions has been awarded the contract to produce a replacement breakfast programme for Channel 4 when The Big Breakfast is axed in March 2002.
- 22 December
  - Pop Idol contestant Rik Waller withdraws from the knockout stage of the competition because of a throat infection, having been allowed to sit out the previous week's show in the hope he would recover. His place is taken by Darius Danesh who was third in the same qualifying heat as Waller.
  - The pilot for Harry Hill's TV Burp is aired on ITV1. The first full series is shown from November next year.
- 23 December – BBC One airs the network television premiere of Notting Hill, starring Julia Roberts and Hugh Grant.
- 25 December – Only Fools and Horses returns for the first of three Christmas specials after previously ending in 1996 for the classic sitcom's 20th anniversary. The special, If They Could See Us Now gets 21.34 million viewers, the UK's highest rated show of the entire decade of 2000–2009. Other Christmas Day highlights on BBC One include Toy Story, the first part of a two-part dramatisation of Arthur Conan Doyle's The Lost World and Sliding Doors.
- 29 December – This evening's episode of Blind Date sees contestant Hannarle Davies from Essex propose to Mark Ackerell from Buckinghamshire after they fell in love on their date to Vienna, Austria. Davies later admits that the proposal was a joke.
- 31 December –
  - Smallville makes its UK television debut on Channel 4.
  - Wellbeing, a joint venture of Granada TV and the Boots Pharmacy chain, closes after less than a year on air.

== Debuts ==
=== BBC ===
- 1 January
  - Gentlemen's Relish (2001)
  - Two Thousand Acres of Sky (2001–2003)
  - Fun at the Funeral Parlour (2001–2002)
- 3 January – Custer's Last Stand-up (2001)
- 5 January – El Nombre (2001–2003)
- 7 January – Rebel Heart (2001)
- 9 January – Judge John Deed (2001–2007)
- 10 January – In a Land of Plenty (2001)
- 13 January – I Love the '80s (2001)
- 16 January – Look and Read: Zzaap and the Word Master (2001)
- 20 January – Jet Set (2001–2007)
- 30 January – Congo (2001)
- 2 February
  - Adrian Mole: The Cappuccino Years (2001)
  - Office Gossip (2001)
- 4 February – Love in a Cold Climate (2001)
- 18 February – Best of Both Worlds (2001)
- 19 February – In Deep (2001–2003)
- 25 February – Attention Scum (2001)
- 26 February – Two Pints of Lager and a Packet of Crisps (2001–2011)
- 4 March – Are You Dave Gorman? (2001)
- 12 March – The Inspector Lynley Mysteries (2001–2008)
- 20 March – Happiness (2001–2003)
- 26 March
  - So What Now? (2001)
  - NCS: Manhunt (2001–2002)
- 6 April – Malcolm in the Middle (2000–2006)
- 14 April – Dog Eat Dog (2001–2002)
- 22 April – Murder in Mind (2001–2003)
- 24 April – The Savages (2001)
- 9 May – Residents (2001)
- 10 May – Perfect Strangers (2001)
- 26 May – Messiah (2001–2008)
- 4 June – Score (2001)
- 9 June – The Joy of Text (2001)
- 10 June – Speed (2001)
- 14 June – Nice Guy Eddie (2001–2002)
- 22 June – The Cazalets (2001)
- 24 June – World of Pub (2001)
- 1 July – Velvet Soup (2001–2003)
- 9 July – The Office (2001–2003)
- 10 July – Strumpet (2001)
- 16 July
  - 60 Seconds (2001–2016)
  - Merseybeat (2001–2004)
- 22 July – Life as We Know It (2001)
- 2 August – Tales from Pleasure Beach (2001)
- 18 August – I Love the '90s (2001)
- 26 August – Victoria & Albert (2001)
- 28 August – Bedtime (2001–2003)
- 3 September
  - The Cramp Twins (2001–2005)
  - South East Today (2001–present)
  - What the Victorians Did for Us (2001)
- 4 September – Ultimate Book of Spells (2001–2002)
- 10 September – 'Orrible (2001)
- 12 September – The Blue Planet (2001)
- 16 September – Armadillo (2001)
- 17 September – Barnaby Bear (as part of Watch)
- 18 September — So Little Time (2001–2002)
- 22 September – The Saturday Show (2001–2005)
- 24 September – Eureka TV (2001–2005)
- 26 September – Oscar Charlie (2001)
- 27 September – Hollywood 7 (2001)
- 30 September – Vacuuming Completely Nude in Paradise (2001)
- 1 October – BBC London News (2001–present)
- 5 October – Band of Brothers (2001)
- 8 October – Robot Wars Extreme (2001–2003)
- 10 October – Babyfather (2001–2002)
- 14 October – LA Pool Party (2001–2002)
- 15 October – Sweet Revenge (2001)
- 17 October – The Bench (2001–2002)
- 28 October
  - Invasion (2001)
  - Aaagh! It's the Mr. Hell Show! (2001–2002)
- 30 October – Linda Green (2001–2002)
- 2 November – Friday Night with Jonathan Ross (2001–2010)
- 6 November – Blood of the Vikings (2001)
- 7 November – Wild Africa (2001)
- 11 November – The Way We Live Now (2001)
- 12 November
  - The Kumars at No. 42 (2001–2006 BBC, 2014–present Sky)
  - Dr. Terrible's House of Horrible (2001)
  - Mr. Charity (2001)
- 15 November – Walking with Beasts (2001)
- 17 November – The Waiting Game (2001–2002)
- 29 November – What Not to Wear (2001–2007)
- 8 December – The Private Life of a Masterpiece (2001–2010)
- 9 December – I Was a Rat (2001)
- 25 December – The Lost World (2001)
- 28 December – Red Cap (2001, 2003–2004)
- Unknown – Binka (2001)

=== ITV (Including ITV1 and ITV2) ===
- 10 January – Popstars (2001)
- 21 March – The Hunt (2001)
- 22 April – High Stakes (2001)
- 12 May – Slap Bang with Ant & Dec (2001)
- 14 May – Sam's Game (2001)
- 21 May – Survivor (2001–2002)
- 27 May – The Glass (2001)
- 6 June – Real Crime (2001–2011)
- 10 June – Tiny Planets (2001–2002)
- 1 July – Ky's Bommerang (2001–2003)
- 5 August – Take Me (2001)
- 18 August
  - The Goal Rush (2001–2003)
  - The Premiership (2001–2004)
- 3 September – Cardcaptors
- 3 September – Soapstars (2001)
- 10 September
  - Bob & Rose (2001)
  - The Biggest Game in Town (2001)
- 10 September The Sketch Show (2001–2003)
- 6 October – Pop Idol (2001–2003)
- 14 October
  - Hidden Treasure (2001)
  - 2DTV (2001–2004)
- 15 October – Angelina Ballerina (2001–2006)
- 22 October – Back Home (2001)
- 28 October – My Uncle Silas (2001–2003)
- 5 November
  - Sooty (2001–2004)
  - Shafted (2001)
- 6 November – Night and Day (2001–2003)
- 19 November – 24Seven (2001–2002)
- 28 November – Weirdsister College (2001)
- 26 December – Micawber (2001)
- Unknown – The Russian Bride (2001)

=== Channel 4 ===
- 2 January – The 1940s House (2001)
- 12 January – Get Your Kit Off (UK game show) (2001)
- 14 January – Phoenix Nights (2001–2002)
- 15 January – The Hoobs (2001–2003)
- 18 January – The West Wing (1999–2006)
- 20 January – Popworld (2001–2007)
- 22 January – As If (2001–2004)
- 17 February – Pelswick (2000–2002)
- 21 February – Metrosexuality (2001)
- 9 March – Celebrity Big Brother (Channel 4 2001–2010, Channel 5 2011–present)
- 21 March – Teachers (2001–2004)
- 3 April – Will & Grace (1998–2006)
- 3 June – Men Only (2001)
- 30 August – The Armando Iannucci Shows (2001)
- 10 September – The Six Wives of Henry VIII (2001)
- 25 September
  - Extinct (2001)
  - X-Fire (2001–2002)
- 26 September – Model Behaviour (2001–2002)
- 1 October – Lost (2001)
- 13 November – It's a Girl Thing (2001)
- 26 November – Richard & Judy (2001–2008)
- 5 December – Swallow (2001)
- 31 December – Smallville (2001–2011)

=== Channel 5 ===
- 12 January – The Mole (2001)
- 11 March – Touch the Truck (2001)
- 18 May – Greed (2001)
- 9 June – CSI: Crime Scene Investigation (2000–2015)

=== Sky ===
- 22 April – Do or Die (2001)
- 19 September – Now You See Her (2001)
- 20 October – Yu-Gi-Oh! (2001–2006)

=== Challenge TV ===
- 12 November – Stake Out (2001)

=== Play UK ===
- 6 October – The Mitchell and Webb Situation (2001)

=== E4 ===
- 18 January – Banzai (2001–2003)

=== S4C ===
- 7 January – Arachnid (2001)

=== Cartoon Network UK ===
- 15 January – Mobile Suit Gundam Wing
- 5 February – Tenchi Muyo!
- 4 May – Home Movies (1999–2004)
- 4 May – Sheep in the Big City (2000–2002)
- 3 September – The Cramp Twins (2001–2005)
- 3 September – X-Men: Evolution (2000–2004)
- 23 November – Samurai Jack (2001–2004)

=== Nickelodeon UK ===
- 8 January – As Told by Ginger (2000–2006)
- 30 April – Cardcaptors (2000–2002)
- 30 July – The Amanda Show (2001–2014)
- 1 October – Taina (2001–2002)
- 10 November – Pelswick (2000–2002)

=== Disney Channel UK ===
- 4 June – Lloyd In Space (2001–2004)
- 3 September – Lizzie McGuire (2001–2004)

=== Fox Kids UK ===
- 8 January – Power Rangers: Lightspeed Rescue (2000)
- 9 April – Jackie Chan Adventures (2001–2005)
- 3 September – Braceface (2001–2004)
- 3 September – Power Rangers: Time Force (2001)
- 3 November – Totally Spies! (2001–2008)

== Channels ==
=== New channels ===
Date	Channel
18 January	E4
1 February	The Studio
14 March	Wellbeing
1 May	MTV Hits
15 May	Smash Hits
11 August	ITV Sport Channel
5 October	Life TV
5 November	UK Food

=== Defunct channels ===
Date	Channel
17 March	SceneOne
31 March	BBC Choice Northern Ireland
31 March	BBC Choice Scotland
31 March	BBC Choice Wales
1 May	MTV Extra
27 July	S2
2 September	.tv
30 November	TasteCFN
31 December	Wellbeing

=== Rebranded channels ===
Date	Old Name	New Name
11 August	ITV	ITV1

== Television shows ==
=== Changes of network affiliation ===
Shows	Moved From	Moved To
7 January – Lily Savage's Blankety Blank	BBC One	ITV1
30 July – Star Trek	BBC Two	E4
The Practice	ITV1	BBC One
16 July – Home and Away	ITV1	Channel 5
Northern Exposure	Channel 4	ITV2
4 January – Sunset Beach	Channel 5	ITV1 ITV2
Will & Grace	Sky One	Channel 4
Malcolm In The Middle	Sky One	BBC Two
Jackie Chan Adventures	Fox Kids	BBC One

=== Returning this year after a break of one year or longer ===
- 2 January – The Flower Pot Men (1952–1958, 2001–2002)
- 22 January – ITV News at Ten (1967–1999, 2001–2004, 2008–present)
- 5 March – Crossroads (1964–1988, 2001–2003)
- 31 August – Absolutely Fabulous (1992–1996, 2001–2004, 2011–2012)
- 25 December – Only Fools and Horses (1981–1996, 2001–2003, 2014)

== Continuing television shows ==
=== 1920s ===
- BBC Wimbledon (1927–present)

=== 1930s ===
- Trooping the Colour (1937–1939, 1946–2019, 2023–present)
- The Boat Race (1938–1939, 1946–2019, 2021–present)

=== 1950s ===
- Panorama (1953–present)
- What the Papers Say (1956–2008)
- Captain Pugwash (1957–1975, 1997–2002)
- The Sky at Night (1957–present)
- Blue Peter (1958–present)
- Grandstand (1958–2007)

=== 1960s ===
- Coronation Street (1960–present)
- Songs of Praise (1961–present)
- Top of the Pops (1964–2006)
- Match of the Day (1964–present)
- Call My Bluff (1965–2005)
- The Money Programme (1966–2010)

=== 1970s ===
- Emmerdale (1972–present)
- Newsround (1972–present)
- Last of the Summer Wine (1973–2010)
- Wish You Were Here...? (1974–2003)
- Arena (1975–present)
- One Man and His Dog (1976–present)
- Grange Hill (1978–2008)
- Ski Sunday (1978–present)
- Blankety Blank (1979–1990, 1997–2002)
- Antiques Roadshow (1979–present)
- Question Time (1979–present)

=== 1980s ===
- Children in Need (1980–present)
- Timewatch (1982–present)
- Brookside (1982–2003)
- Countdown (1982–present)
- James the Cat (1984–1992, 1998–2003)
- The Bill (1984–2010)
- Channel 4 Racing (1984–2016)
- Thomas the Tank Engine & Friends (1984–present)
- EastEnders (1985–present)
- Comic Relief (1985–present)
- Casualty (1986–present)
- ChuckleVision (1987–2009)
- London's Burning (1988–2002)
- On the Record (1988–2002)
- Fifteen to One (1988–2003, 2013–2019)
- This Morning (1988–present)

=== 1990s ===
- Stars in Their Eyes (1990–2006)
- Big Break (1991–2002)
- Heartbeat (1992–2010)
- 999 (1992–2003)
- The Big Breakfast (1992–2002)
- Breakfast with Frost (1993–2005)
- Wipeout (1994–2002)
- Animal Hospital (1994–2004)
- Room 101 (1994–2007, 2012–present)
- Time Team (1994–2013)
- The National Lottery Draws (1994–2017)
- Top of the Pops 2 (1994–present)
- Dalziel and Pascoe (1996–2007)
- Teletubbies (1997–2002, 2007–2009, 2012, 2015–present)
- Y Clwb Rygbi, Wales (1997–present)
- Dream Team (1997–2007)
- Family Affairs (1997–2005)
- Midsomer Murders (1997–present)
- Who Wants to Be a Millionaire? (1998–2014)
- Bob the Builder (1998–present)
- British Soap Awards (1999–2019, 2022–present
- Holby City (1999–2022)
- My Parents Are Aliens (1999–2006)
- Small Potatoes (1999–2001)
- Tweenies (1999–2002)

=== 2000s ===
- Doctors (2000–present)
- Big Brother (2000–2018)
- The Weakest Link (2000–2012, 2017–present)
- The People Versus (2000–2002)
- Time Gentlemen Please (2000–2002)
- At Home with the Braithwaites (2000–2003)
- Clocking Off (2000–2003)

== Ending this year ==
- It's a Knockout (1966–1982, 1999–2001)
- Words and Pictures (1970–2001, 2006–2007)
- Record Breakers (1972–2001)
- The original Top Gear (1977–2001, 2002–present)
- Right to Reply (1982–2001)
- Blockbusters (1983–1993, 1994–1995, 1997, 2000–2001, 2012, 2019–present)
- Surprise, Surprise (1984–2001, 2012–present)
- Central Weekend (1986–2001)
- Equinox (1986–2001)
- Wheel of Fortune (1988–2001)
- Dale's Supermarket Sweep (1993–2001, 2007)
- Live & Kicking (1993–2001)
- ZZZap! (1993–2001)
- Numbertime (1993–2001)
- Kavanagh QC (1995–2001)
- Ballykissangel (1996–2001)
- 100% (1997–2001)
- Teletubbies (1997–2001, 2007–2009, 2012, 2015–2018)
- Don't Try This at Home (1998–2001)
- The Moment of Truth (1998–2001)
- Motorway Life (1998–2001)
- Big Bad World (1999–2001)
- ITV Nightly News (1999–2001)
- See It Saw It (1999–2001)
- Small Potatoes (1999–2001)
- Castaway 2000 (2000–2001)
- Without Motive (2000–2001)
- So What Now? (2001)
- Extinct (2001)
- The original Shipwrecked (2000–2001, 2006–2009, 2011–2012, 2019)

== Births ==
- 24 February – Ramona Marquez, actress
- 15 March – Ellie Leach, actress
- 9 July – Maisie Smith, actress and singer
- 16 December – Sebastian Croft, actor

== Deaths ==
Date	Name	Age	Cinematic credibility
11 January	Michael Williams	65	actor (The Hanged Man, A Fine Romance)
17 January	Robert Robertson	70	actor (Taggart)
1 February	Jack Milroy	86	Scottish comedian, one half of Francie and Josie
4 February	Barry Cockcroft	68	television documentary director and producer
4 February	Tony Steedman	73	actor (Dr Butterworth in Crossroads)
8 February	Brian Nissen	73	actor and television presenter
9 February	Reginald Marsh	74	actor
18 February	Clare Kelly	78	actress
22 February	Christopher Mitchell	52	actor (It Ain't Half Hot Mum)
19 March	Norman Mitchell	82	actor (Dad's Army, It Ain't Half Hot Mum, On the Buses, Beryl's Lot)
20 March	Doreen Gorsky	88	television producer
21 March	Anthony Steel	80	actor
24 March	Muriel Young	77	television presenter
31 March	Edward Jewesbury	83	actor
1 April	Jean Anderson	93	actress (The Brothers, Tenko)
10 April	Nyree Dawn Porter	65	actress (The Forsyte Saga)
11 April	George Hersee	76	BBC engineer who designed Test Card F
11 April	Harry Secombe	79	singer, comedian and television presenter (Songs of Praise, Stars on Sunday, Highway)
17 April	Terry Scully	68	actor
18 April	Tony Bartley	82	television executive
28 April	Paul Daneman	75	actor
2 May	Ted Rogers	65	comedian and host of 3-2-1
9 May	Leslie Sands	79	actor (Cluff, The Saint, The Avengers, Z-Cars)
19 May	John Warner	77	actor (Potter, Terry and June)
22 May	Jack Watling	78	actor (The Plane Makers, The Power Game, Pathfinders)
20 June	Angela Browne	62	actress (Ghost Squad, The Avengers, The Prisoner, Upstairs, Downstairs, The Adventures of Sherlock Holmes)
27 June	Joan Sims	71	actress (Till Death Us Do Part, Sykes, On the Up, As Time Goes By)
2 July	Jack Gwillim	91	actor (Danger Man, The Saint, The Troubleshooters)
5 July	George Ffitch	72	television presenter
13 July	Eleanor Summerfield	80	actress (The World of Wooster, Lovejoy, Midsomer Murders)
4 August	Joseph Cooper	88	television presenter (Face the Music)
6 August	Kenneth MacDonald	50	actor (It Ain't Half Hot Mum, Only Fools and Horses)
6 August	Dorothy Tutin	71	actress (The Six Wives of Henry VIII)
18 August	Tom Watson	69	actor
25 August	Inigo Jackson	68	actor
1 September	Brian Moore	69	sports commentator and television presenter
3 September	John Chapman	74	television scriptwriter
22 September	Gordon Reece	71	television producer and journalist
27 September	Helen Cherry	85	actress
29 September	Jimmy O'Connor	83	television scriptwriter (The Wednesday Play and Play for Today)
31 October	Jenny Laird	89	actress (All Creatures Great and Small)
13 November	Peggy Mount	86	actress (George and the Dragon)
14 November	Charlotte Coleman	33	actress (Oranges Are Not the Only Fruit, Worzel Gummidge)
18 November	Malcolm McFee	52	actor (Please Sir!)
24 November	Rachel Gurney	81	actress (Upstairs, Downstairs)
28 November	Michael Yates	82	television designer
11 December	Lynette Lithgow	51	newsreader and journalist
20 December	Edward Evans	87	actor (The Grove Family, Coronation Street)
26 December	Nigel Hawthorne	72	actor (Yes, Prime Minister, Mapp and Lucia)

== See also ==
- 2001 in British music
- 2001 in British radio
- 2001 in the United Kingdom
- List of British films of 2001
