= I Love the '70s (British TV series) =

2000 British television series

- Country of origin: United Kingdom
- No. of series: 1
- No. of episodes: 10

Production
- Producer: BBC
- Running time: 90 minutes

Original release
- Network: BBC Two
- Release: 22 July – 23 September 2000

Related
- I Love the '80s I Love the '90s

I Love the '70s is a television nostalgia series produced by the BBC that examines the pop culture of the 1970s. It was broadcast in ten hour-long episodes, one dedicated to each year, with the first episode, I Love 1970, premiering on BBC Two on 22 July 2000, and the last, I Love 1979, premiering on 23 September 2000. On the original broadcasts, each episode was followed by the host introducing a film from that particular year. Repeat editions have often been edited down in length by featuring fewer items, typically to half an hour runtime.

The series proved successful and thus was followed by two similar series, I Love the '80s and I Love the '90s, both of which aired during 2001.

The "I Love..."-series spawned a U.S. version, aired by VH1. Part of the series was repeated in the spring of 2012 on BBC Two as part of a special season dedicated to the 1970s.

== Topics covered by year ==
=== 1970 ===
Host: Jimmy Savile. Opening titles: "Band of Gold" by Freda Payne. Introduction to show: "Spirit in the Sky" by Norman Greenbaum. Ending credits: "The Liquidator" by the Harry J Allstars.

- Raleigh Chopper
- Scooby-Doo, Where Are You!
- Clangers
- The Goodies
- M*A*S*H
- Dubreq Stylophone
- 1970 FIFA World Cup (the England football team entered the World Cup as defending champions but failed to retain the trophy)
- Kes
- Midiskirt/maxiskirt
- Triumph Stag and Bond Bug
- The transition of popular music into a new decade
  - Break-up of the Beatles
  - Diana Ross leaves The Supremes
  - Simon and Garfunkel break-up
  - The Jackson 5
- Hollywood Music Festival

PIF of 1970: Joe and Petunia

Flashback Commercials of 1970: Cresta – Singing Polar Bear (actually aired in 1972) and

Notes:

- Subsequent repeats of this episode did not feature Scooby-Doo, Where Are You!, due to clearance rights only covering the original transmission of the episode.

- As a result of the 2012 revelations about Jimmy Savile's history of sexual abuse, this edition is very seldom repeated.

=== 1971 ===
Host: Britt Ekland. Opening titles and ending credits: "Move On Up" by Curtis Mayfield. Introduction to show: "Get Down and Get With It" by Slade.

- Space hopper
- The Banana Splits
- Shaft
- Hot pants
- Get Carter
- Clackers
- Harvey Smith
- Novelty Songs
  - "Ernie (The Fastest Milkman In The West)"
  - "Chirpy Chirpy Cheep Cheep"
- Middle of the Road
- Decimal Day
- Jackie Stewart
- The Liver Birds
- The Generation Game

=== 1972 ===
Host: David Cassidy. Opening titles: "Family Affair" by Sly and the Family Stone. Introduction to show: "Children of the Revolution" by T. Rex. Ending credits: "All the Young Dudes" by Mott the Hoople.

- David Cassidy & Donny Osmond
- Sweets
- The New Seekers
- Love Thy Neighbour
- Action Man
- Roller Skates
- Magpie
- Mark Spitz
- The Harlem Globetrotters
- Cabaret
- The Joy of Sex
- Cosmopolitan
- Marc Bolan

PIF of 1972: Learn to Swim

=== 1973 ===
Host: Noddy Holder. Opening titles: "Superstition" by Stevie Wonder. Introduction to show: "Something Tells Me (Something's Gonna Happen Tonight)" by Cilla Black and "Rock and Roll" by Gary Glitter. Ending credits: "Merry Xmas Everybody" by Slade.

- Three-Day Week
- Glam rock
  - Slade
  - Sweet
  - Gary Glitter
- Austin Allegro
- Big dresses and leisure suits
- Kojak
- Parka jackets
- The first divorce of Elizabeth Taylor and Richard Burton
- Mastermind
- Bruce Lee
- Man About the House
- Mike Yarwood
- The England football team's failure to qualify for the 1974 World Cup (just eight years after winning the trophy)
- Uri Geller

Flashback Commercial of 1973: Vymura Wallpaper

Note: This edition acted as the original pilot for the series, originally serving as an in-house demonstration of how a typical episode would run, and as such features Noddy Holder in a 'typical 1973 home'. Although the idea of each edition reflecting a different household in each year was dropped in favour of a different relevant scenario for each year, the house setting was later revived for BBC Two's Back in Time for... series.

=== 1974 ===
Host: Roobarb & Custard. Opening titles: "You Ain't Seen Nothing Yet" by Bachman Turner Overdrive. Ending credits: "The Golden Age of Rock 'n' Roll" by Mott the Hoople.

- Mud
- Alvin Stardust
- The Six Million Dollar Man and *The Bionic Woman (originally aired in 1976)
- Ready meals
  - Super Noodles
  - Angel Delight
  - Vesta
- Slimcea bread
- John Conteh
- Pong
- Videocassette recorders
- It Ain't Half Hot Mum
- Package holidays
- Roobarb
- Blazing Saddles
- Ford Capri
- Pan's People
- The Wombles

=== 1975 ===
Host: Dennis Waterman. Opening titles: "Pick Up the Pieces" by Average White Band. Introduction to show: "Shang-A-Lang" by Bay City Rollers. Ending credits: "Make Me Smile (Come Up and See Me)" by Steve Harley and Cockney Rebel.

- Bay City Rollers
- Fragrances
  - Censored Aftershave
  - Hai Karate
  - Denim For Men (originally founded in 1976)
  - Charlie
- World of Sport
- Frozen desserts
  - Arctic roll
  - Ski yogurt
- Bob Marley
- Barry Sheene
- The Rocky Horror Picture Show
- Happy Days
- Jim'll Fix It
- David Essex
- Jaws
- The Sweeney

=== 1976 ===
Host: Kermit the Frog. Opening titles: "Dancing Queen" by ABBA. Introduction to show: "You Should Be Dancing" by Bee Gees. Ending credits: "Young Hearts Run Free" by Candi Staton.

- The Muppet Show
- Starsky & Hutch
- Disco entering popular music
  - Donna Summer
  - Tina Charles
- Lip gloss
- Punk fashion
- Long hot summer
- Ice lollies
- Björn Borg
- Peter Powell
- "Convoy"
- Citizens' band radio
- ABBA
- Brotherhood of Man

=== 1977 ===
Host: Carrie Fisher. Opening titles: "Star Wars Theme/Cantina Band" by Meco. Ending credits: "Peaches" by The Stranglers.

- Space Dust
- Saturday Night Fever
- Skateboard
- Blue Jeans magazine
- Pot Noodle
- Take Hart
- Slime
- The Professionals
- Queen Elizabeth II's Silver Jubilee (which was marked by widespread public celebrations)
- The Sex Pistols
- Star Wars

=== 1978 ===
Host: Lynda Carter. Opening credits: "Blame It on the Boogie" by The Jacksons. Introduction to show: "No More Heroes" by The Stranglers. Ending credits: "Teenage Kicks" by The Undertones.

- Grease
- The Boomtown Rats
- The Incredible Hulk
- Soda Stream
- Blake's 7
- Kate Bush
- Top Trumps
- Simon
- Hot Gossip
- Space Invaders
- Dean Friedman
- Wonder Woman

Flashback Commercial of 1978: Glenryck Pilchards

=== 1979 ===
Host: Bo Derek. Opening credits: "Pop Muzik" by M. Introduction to show: "Heart of Glass" by Blondie. Ending credits: After the Love Has Gone" by Earth, Wind and Fire.

- Rubik's Cube and other puzzle games
- The Dukes of Hazzard
- Designer jeans (Gloria Vanderbilt and Lee Cooper)
- Quadrophenia
- Holly Hobbie
- Picture and coloured vinyl discs
- Gary Numan
- Monkey
- Leif Garrett
- Top Deck
- Ska and Madness
- 10

Flashback Commercial of 1979: Barbie

== That Was The Year That Was ==
In 2023, the BBC made a new version of the series for Channel 5, again featuring a number of 'talking heads' analysing footage from the BBC archives on a single year. Unlike the original series, ten random years from 1968 to 1990 were picked as they were deemed to be the most controversial, while instead of having a different in-screen presenter each week, a voice over by Jan Leeming was used throughout the series. Debuting as Totally 1976: That Was The Year That Was on 23 September 2023 with contributions from John Thomson, Claire Sweeney and Penny Smith, the programme was retitled as Controversially...That Was The Year That Was and Most Shocking Moments during its outings on the channel.

=== That Was The Year That Was 1970s episodes ===
- 1976: Most Shocking Moments (23 September 2023)
- 1979: Most Shocking Moments (07 October 2023)
- 1972: Most Shocking Moments (03 February 2024)

I Love the '70s	Next: I Love the '80s (British TV series)
