= 2001 in British radio =

This is a list of events in British radio during 2001.

== Events ==
=== January ===
- 31 January – BBC Radio 2 begins broadcasting the eight-part series, Kirsty MacColl's Cuba, which was postponed as a mark of respect following her death in December 2000.

=== February ===
- 16 February – Simon Mayo hosts his final show on BBC Radio 1 having been with the station since 1986.
- 19 February – Jo Whiley begins presenting her weekday morning programme, The Jo Whiley Show on BBC Radio 1.

=== March to April ===
- No events

=== May ===
- 4 May – Talksport secures rights to broadcast Premier League games for the first time after the Radio Authority grants the station permission to broadcast games involving Chelsea, Fulham and Tottenham Hotspur on their London transmitters only. Later, Talksport secures similar deals with Everton, Blackburn Rovers and Manchester City for their transmitters in Greater Manchester, Merseyside and Lancashire following approval from the Radio Authority. The station also has the ability to split their transmitters in the West Midlands for games involving Aston Villa but this never comes to fruition.
- 10 May – For the first time, BBC Radio 2 becomes the UK's most listened to radio station, overtaking BBC Radio 1. It holds this position ever since.

=== June ===
- 28 June – Chris Evans is dismissed by Virgin Radio for repeatedly failing to arrive at work. Evans is replaced by Steve Penk, whom Evans criticises for his age – 39 versus Evans's 35 at this time. Evans subsequently attempts to sue Virgin Radio, claiming that he was unfairly dismissed and denied share options worth £8.6 million but in 2003 is found to have been fairly dismissed and not entitled to the share options.

=== July ===
- No events

=== August ===
- Undated in August – The KM Group take full control of Neptune Radio and CTFM.

=== September ===
- 11 September – Following today's terrorist attacks on the United States, and the collapse of the Twin Towers in New York City live on television, most broadcasters abandon regular programming in order to provide up to date coverage of unfolding events.
- Undated in September – KM Group rebrands its newly acquired Mercury FM stations as KMFM West Kent and KMFM Medway.

=== October ===
- 1 October – BBC Radio 2 starts broadcasting a weekly album chart show. The one-hour programme is broadcast on Monday evenings and is presented by Simon Mayo.
- 4 October – Premier Christian Radio receives an official warning from the Radio Authority for broadcasting "items that were offensive to people of other, non-Christian beliefs".
- 16 October – Saga 105.7 FM, the first radio station dedicated to the over-50s, is launched in Birmingham.
- Undated in October
  - BBC London Live changes its name to BBC London 94.9.
  - BBC Three Counties Radio launches opt-out programming for the county of Buckinghamshire.
  - The Sky News Radio service is expanded to provide hourly news bulletins, audio and scripts for a number of clients in the commercial radio sector.

=== November ===
- 2 November – It is reported that police are to examine an edition of BBC Radio 2's Jimmy Young Show broadcast on 31 October to decide whether comments made on the programme by Abdul Haq, a spokesman for the extremist Muslim group al-Muhajiroun amount to incitement. Haq said he and other Muslims would "continue to struggle and strive until we see the flag of Islam flying over 10 Downing Street". The show has drawn over 200 complaints.
- 24 November – On the tenth anniversary of Freddie Mercury's death, BBC Radio 2 airs The Mercury Tapes, a programme featuring recently discovered recordings made by David Wigg in which he talks to the Queen frontman about his life and music.
- 25 November – After 42 years on air, Sing Something Simple broadcasts for the final time. The programme ends partly because of Cliff Adams's death on 22 October and partly because of Radio 2's repositioning to appeal to the former Radio 1 audience. A tribute to Cliff Adams is broadcast five weeks later.

=== December ===
- 17 December – Release of the Gordon Haskell song "How Wonderful You Are" which is issued as a single after mass promotion by BBC Radio 2 where it becomes a favourite of listeners after being played on the Johnnie Walker show. The song becomes the most requested song of all time at the station and the Christmas number-two in the UK charts.
- 20 December – Enda Caldwell presents Atlantic 252's final live programme before the station goes off air after twelve years. It continues with an automated output for a few weeks before finally ending in January 2002.
- 25 December – Classic FM broadcasts its Nation's Favourite Christmas Carol countdown for the first time.
- Undated in December – The eight medium wave Magic stations in northern England begin networking 10 am – 2 pm and 7 pm – 6 am with the London station Magic 105.4 providing the programmes.

== Station debuts ==
- 1 March – 107.8 Radio Jackie
- 3 March – Hertbeat FM
- 31 March – Bright 106.4
- 30 May – Castle Rock FM
- 3 June – Compass FM
- 16 June – KCR 106.7
- 4 July – Quay West 107.4 (2001–2010)
- 27 July – Energy FM
- 16 October – Saga 105.7 FM (2001–2007)
- 23 October – Lakeland Radio
- 31 October – Mix 107
- 5 November – 3TR FM (2001–2010)
- Unknown
  - Fusion FM
  - Garrison FM

== Programme debuts ==
- 28 January – Parsons and Naylor's Pull-Out Sections on BBC Radio 2 (2001–2007)
- 31 January – Kirsty MacColl's Cuba on BBC Radio 2 (2001)
- 19 February – The Jo Whiley Show on BBC Radio 1 (2001–2009)
- 4 April – The Leopard in Autumn on BBC Radio 4 (2001–2002)
- 15 April – Go4It on BBC Radio 4 (2001–2009)
- 16 May – Dave Podmore's Cricket Fix on BBC Radio 4 (2001–2020)
- June – Comedy Album Heroes on BBC Radio 4 (2001–2003)
- 12 July – Linda Smith's A Brief History of Timewasting on BBC Radio 4 (2001–2002)
- 28 July – Jammin' on BBC Radio 2 (2001–2008)
- 14 August – The Right Time on BBC Radio 4 (2001–2004)
- 24 August – Great Lives on BBC Radio 4 (2001–Present)
- 16 October
  - The Boosh on BBC Radio 4 (2001)
  - Think the Unthinkable on BBC Radio 4 (2001–2005)
- 17 October – Say the Word on BBC Radio 4 (2001)
- Unknown – Kermode and Mayo's Film Review on BBC Radio 5 Live (2001–2022)

== Continuing radio programmes ==
=== 1940s ===
- Sunday Half Hour (1940–2018)
- Desert Island Discs (1942–Present)
- Letter from America (1946–2004)
- Woman's Hour (1946–Present)
- A Book at Bedtime (1949–Present)

=== 1950s ===
- The Archers (1950–Present)
- The Today Programme (1957–Present)
- Your Hundred Best Tunes (1959–2007)

=== 1960s ===
- Farming Today (1960–Present)
- In Touch (1961–Present)
- The World at One (1965–Present)
- The Official Chart (1967–Present)
- Just a Minute (1967–Present)
- The Living World (1968–Present)
- The Organist Entertains (1969–2018)

=== 1970s ===
- PM (1970–Present)
- Start the Week (1970–Present)
- You and Yours (1970–Present)
- I'm Sorry I Haven't a Clue (1972–Present)
- Good Morning Scotland (1973–Present)
- Newsbeat (1973–Present)
- File on 4 (1977–Present)
- Money Box (1977–Present)
- The News Quiz (1977–Present)
- Feedback (1979–Present)
- The Food Programme (1979–Present)
- Science in Action (1979–Present)

=== 1980s ===
- Steve Wright in the Afternoon (1981–1993, 1999–2022)
- In Business (1983–Present)
- Sounds of the 60s (1983–Present)
- Loose Ends (1986–Present)

=== 1990s ===
- The Moral Maze (1990–Present)
- Essential Selection (1991–Present)
- No Commitments (1992–2007)
- The Pepsi Chart (1993–2002)
- Wake Up to Wogan (1993–2009)
- Essential Mix (1993–Present)
- Up All Night (1994–Present)
- Wake Up to Money (1994–Present)
- Private Passions (1995–Present)
- Parkinson's Sunday Supplement (1996–2007)
- The David Jacobs Collection (1996–2013)
- Westway (1997–2005)
- The 99p Challenge (1998–2004)
- Puzzle Panel (1998–2005)
- Drivetime with Johnnie Walker (1998–2006)
- Sunday Night at 10 (1998–2013)
- In Our Time (1998–Present)
- Material World (1998–Present)
- Scott Mills (1998–2022)
- The Now Show (1998–Present)
- The Attractive Young Rabbi (1999–2002)
- It's Been a Bad Week (1999–2006)
- Jonathan Ross (1999–2010)

=== 2000s ===
- Dead Ringers (2000–2007, 2014–Present)
- BBC Radio 2 Folk Awards (2000–Present)
- Sounds of the 70s (2000–2008, 2009–Present)
- The Human Zoo (2000–2002)
- Little Britain (2000–2002)
- Big John @ Breakfast (2000–Present)

== Ending this year ==
- 20 January – Saturday Night Jack (2000–2001)
- March – The Big Booth (2000–2001)
- 21 March – Kirsty MacColl's Cuba (2001)
- 8 November – The News Huddlines (1975–2001)
- 20 November – The Boosh (2001)
- 25 November – Sing Something Simple (1959–2001)

== Closing this year ==
- Oxygen FM

== Deaths ==
- 21 February – Ronnie Hilton, 75, radio presenter
- 27 March – Irene Thomas, 80, radio personality
- 26 April – Bryon Butler, 66, football correspondent
- 13 July – Eleanor Summerfield, 80, actress and radio panel show member
- 30 July – John Walters, 62, radio music producer and jazz trumpeter
- 1 September – Brian Moore, 69, football commentator
- 8 October – Laurie Macmillan, 54, Scottish-born radio newsreader and continuity announcer
- 22 October – Cliff Adams, 77, musician and bandleader

== See also ==
- 2001 in British music
- 2001 in British television
- 2001 in the United Kingdom
- List of British films of 2001
