= I Love the '90s (British TV series) =

2001 British TV series

- Opening title
- Country of origin: United Kingdom
- No. of series: 1
- No. of episodes: 10

Production
- Executive producer: Alan Brown
- Producer: Stephen McGinn
- Running time: 60 minutes
- Production company: BBC

Original release
- Network: BBC Two
- Release: 18 August – 3 November 2001

Related
- I Love the '70s (British TV series); I Love the '80s (British TV series)

I Love the '90s is a BBC television nostalgia series that examined the pop culture of the 1990s. It was commissioned following the success of I Love the '70s and I Love the '80s, with episodes being 60 minutes long, except for 1990, which was 90 minutes long. The series was executive produced by Alan Brown, with Stephen McGinn serving as series producer. In 2019, the series was repeated as a weekly show lasting 30 minutes per year, with I Love 1993 following on from the I Love 1987 episode in BBC Two's Monday night listings.

== Background ==
There were ten episodes, with one devoted to each year from 1990 to 1999. Each episode recalled major events (such as the 1991 Gulf War and 1997 death of Diana, Princess of Wales) from the given year, along with popular or memorable films, television series, music, video games and fashion trends, as well as short-lived fads, and was hosted by a celebrity (or celebrities, or in one stance cartoon characters) connected with one of the items from that year.

The final episode, I Love '99, ended with the Baz Luhrmann produced hit single of the year, "Everybody's Free (To Wear Sunscreen)", whilst a montage of all of the BBC "I Love..." episodes, from 1970 to 1999 was shown.

== Contributors ==
The series used many regular contributors, which included Peter Kay, Clare Grogan, Dee Hepburn, Kate Thornton, Stuart Maconie, Emma B, Ice-T, Toyah Willcox, Tommy Vance, Tara Palmer-Tomkinson, Ross Noble, Vernon Kay, Trevor Nelson and many others.

== Episodes ==
=== I Love 1990 – broadcast 18 August 2001 ===
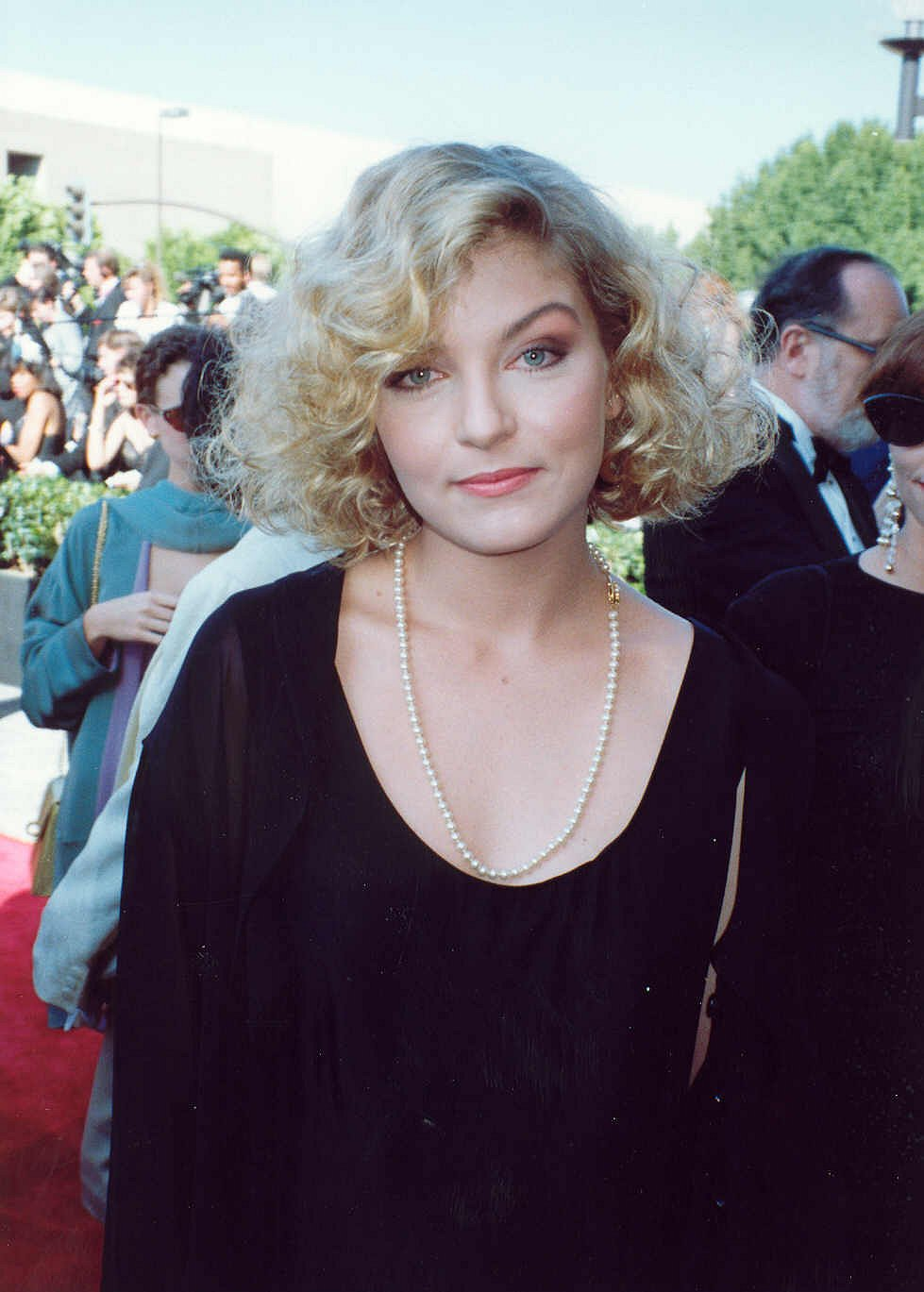
Season one of Twin Peaks focused on a mystery centred around the character of Laura Palmer, played by Sheryl Lee.

Presented by Sheryl Lee (from Twin Peaks). Opening titles: "Doin' the Do" by Betty Boo. Ending credits: "The Power" by Snap!. Produced and directed by Karina Brennan.

The episode features:

- Twin Peaks
- MC Hammer / Vanilla Ice
- Supermodels
- Volkswagen girl advert
- Goodfellas
- Vogueing
- Creature Comforts
- World Cup 90 / Gazza (featuring the England national football team's run to the semi-finals of the World Cup, and the iconic status achieved by player Paul Gascoigne)
- Sinéad O'Connor – "Nothing Compares 2 U"
- The Simpsons
- Adamski/ Seal
- Baywatch

=== I Love 1991 – broadcast 25 August 2001 ===
Presented by Vic Reeves and Bob Mortimer. Opening titles: "The Size of a Cow" by The Wonder Stuff. Ending credits: "Get the Message" by Electronic. Produced and directed by Martyn Smith.

The episode features:

- Chippendales
- The Commitments
- Häagen-Dazs
- Grunge / Nirvana
- Vic Reeves Big Night Out
- Right Said Fred
- Sonic the Hedgehog and Super Mario
- Sasha / the rise of the superstar DJ and UK club culture (including piano house)
- The Lovers' Guide

=== I Love 1992 – broadcast 1 September 2001 ===
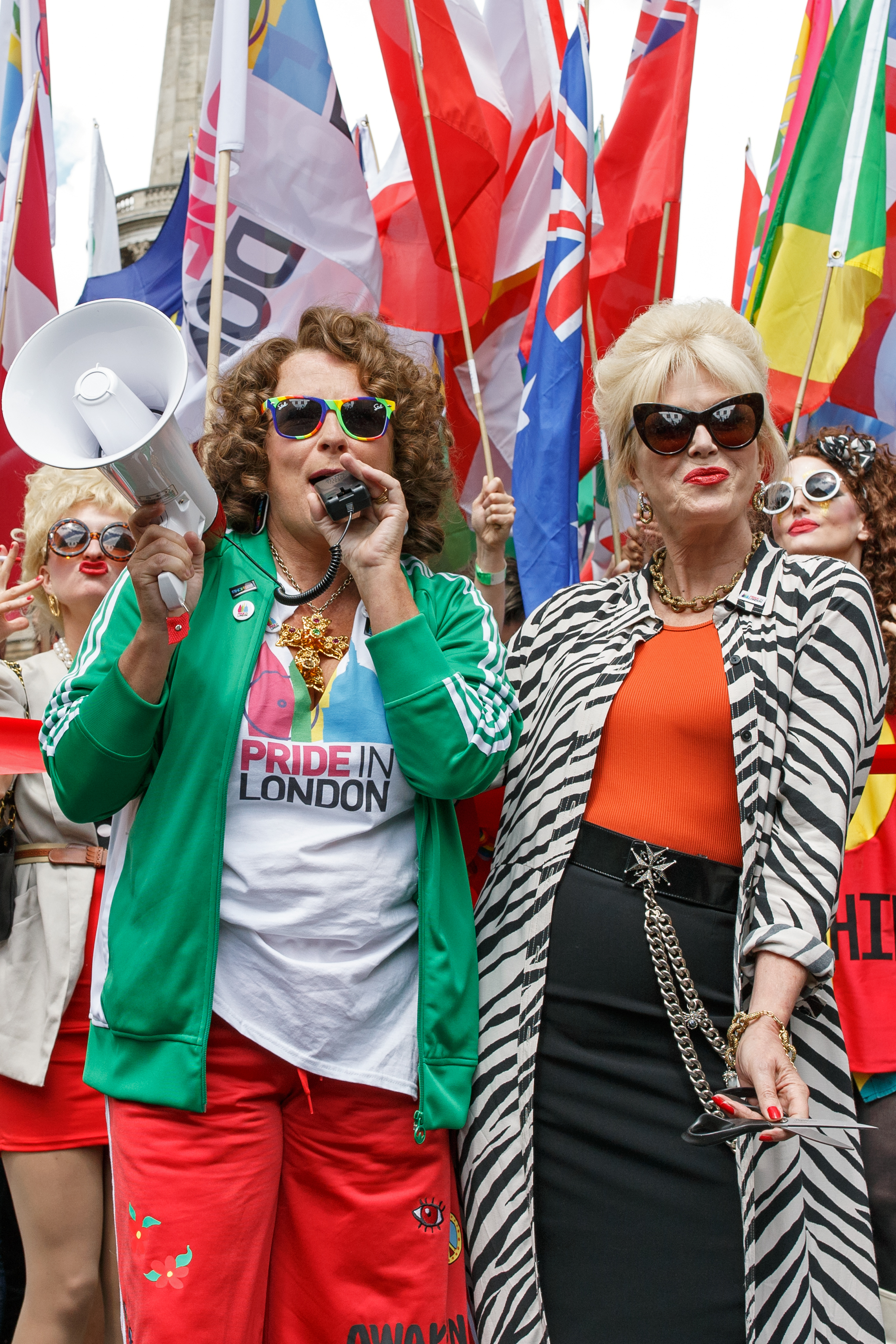
Jennifer Saunders and Joanna Lumley as their Absolutely Fabulous characters, in 2016.

Presented by Mark Owen (from Take That). Opening titles: "It Only Takes a Minute" by Take That. Ending credits: "Stay" by Shakespears Sister. Produced and directed by Andrew Nicholson.

The episode features:

- Take That
- Gladiators
- Wayne's World
- Tango advert
- The Shamen
- For Women (magazines) and Condoms
- Reservoir Dogs
- Billy Ray Cyrus – "Achy Breaky Heart"
- Absolutely Fabulous

=== I Love 1993 – broadcast 8 September 2001 ===
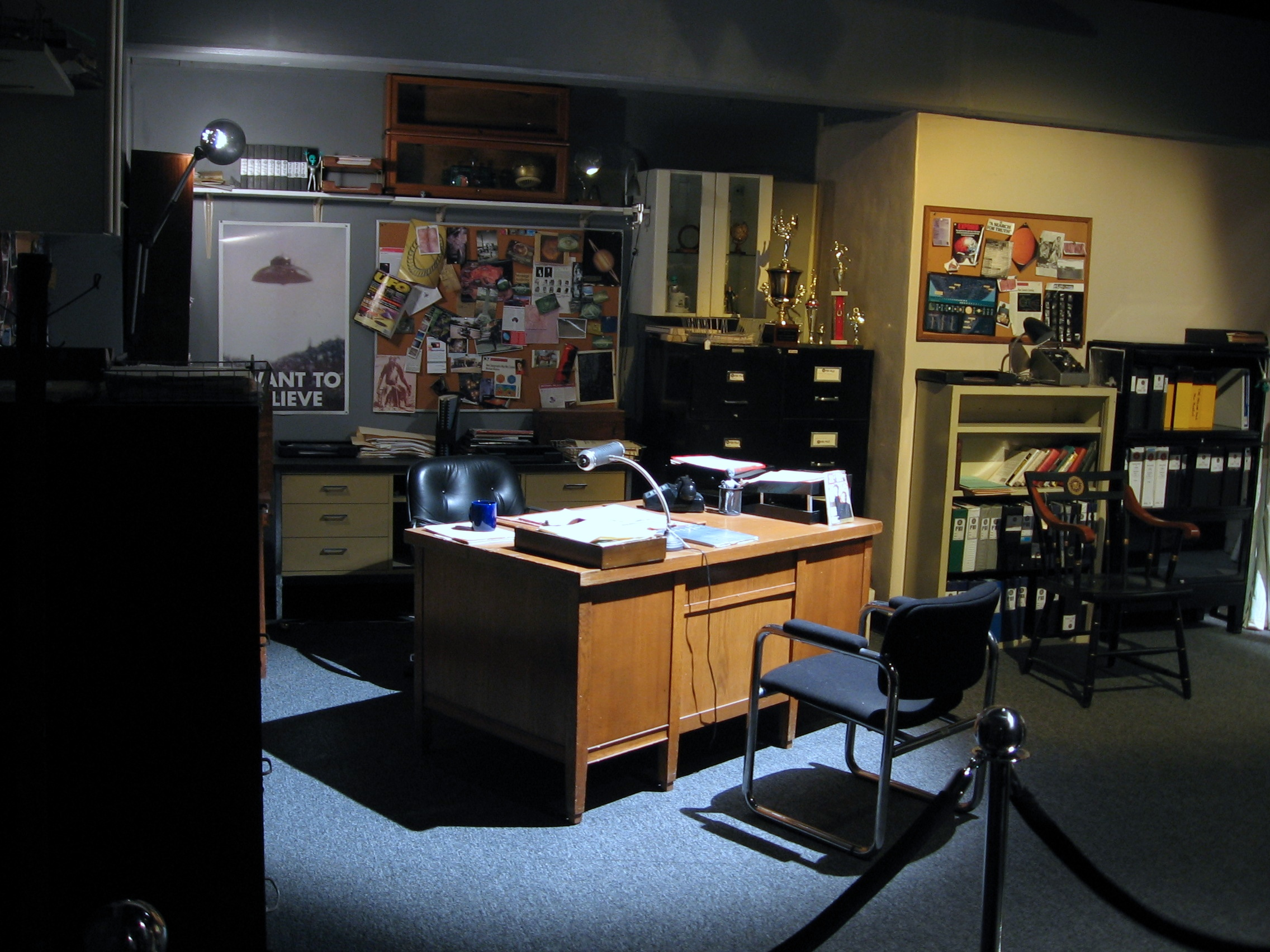
Aliens, government conspiracies and the paranormal were overarching themes of The X-Files, inspired by earlier series such as Twin Peaks.

Presented by Beavis and Butt-Head. Opening titles: "Jump Around" by House of Pain. Ending credits: "Regret" by New Order.

The episode features:

- Mr Blobby (iconic bulbous costume character first introduced by Noel Edmonds on TV in late 1992)
- Indecent Proposal
- John Wayne Bobbitt
- East 17
- Tattoo and body piercing
- Eternal
- Beavis and Butt-Head
- Boddingtons advert with Melanie Sykes
- The X-Files
- Shaggy and Jamaican music

=== I Love 1994 – broadcast 15 September 2001 ===
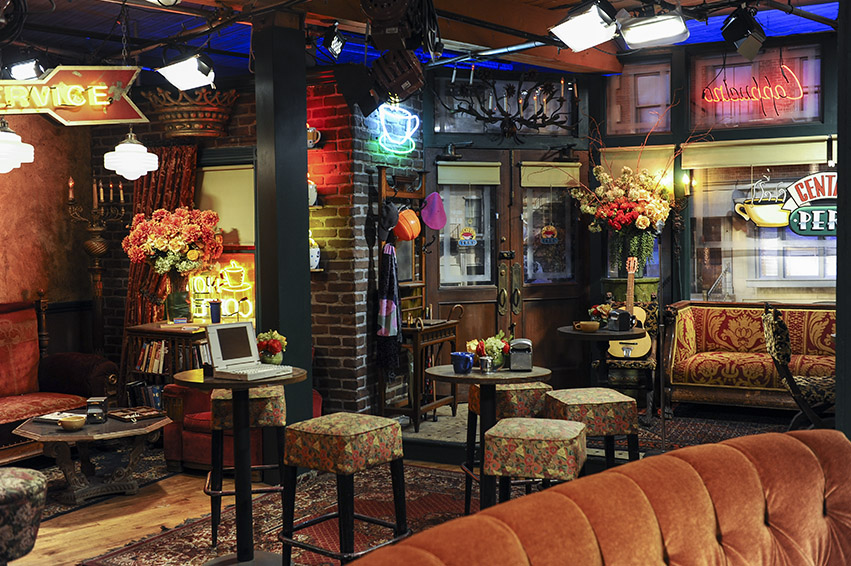
The set of Central Perk, a frequently featured setting in Friends.

Presented by Eva Herzigova. Opening titles: "Live Forever" by Oasis. Ending credits: "7 Seconds" by Youssou N'Dour and Neneh Cherry.

The episode features:

- Britpop
- Four Weddings and A Funeral / "Love Is All Around" by Wet Wet Wet (the hugely successful film and the soundtrack which accompanied it)
- Wonderbra and Tommy Hilfiger fashions
- OJ Simpson trial
- Friends
- Pulp Fiction

=== I Love 1995 – broadcast 29 September 2001 ===
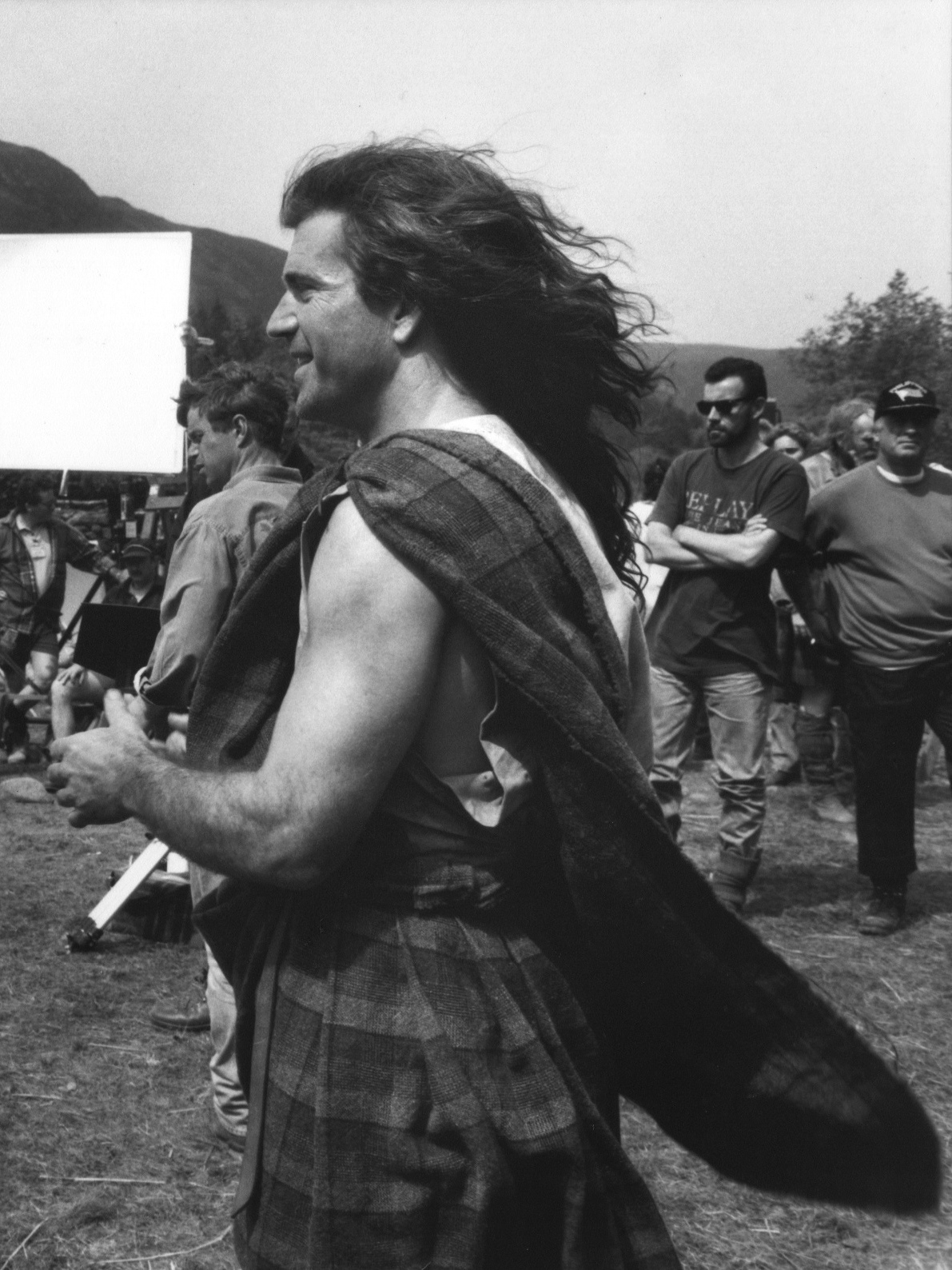
Mel Gibson on the set of Braveheart.

Presented by Edwyn Collins Opening titles: "Alright" by Supergrass. Ending credits "A Girl Like You" by Edwyn Collins.

The episode features:

- The Usual Suspects
- Club 18-30
- Alcopops
- Alanis Morissette
- CK One
- Guinness advert – Dancing man
- Braveheart
- Dennis Pennis
- Edwyn Collins

=== I Love 1996 – broadcast 6 October 2001 ===
Presented by Amita Dhiri (from This Life). Opening titles: "Female of the Species" by Space. Ending credits: "Slight Return" by The Bluetones.

The episode featured:

- Spice Girls
- This Life
- Toy Story
- Mark Morrison
- Euro '96 / "Three Lions" (the England football team's fortunes as hosts and semi-finalists of the European Championships)
- Ladettes / The Girlie Show
- Trainspotting
- "Macarena"
- Tomb Raider

=== I Love 1997 – broadcast 13 October 2001 ===
Presented by Melinda Messenger. Opening titles: "Ready to Go" by Republica. Ending credits: "Don't Speak" by No Doubt.

The episode features:

- Chumbawamba
- Diet Coke man
- The Full Monty
- Melinda Messenger
- The Prodigy
- Teletubbies
- Bridget Jones's Diary
- Driving School and Docusoaps
- Viagra

=== I Love 1998 – broadcast 27 October 2001 ===
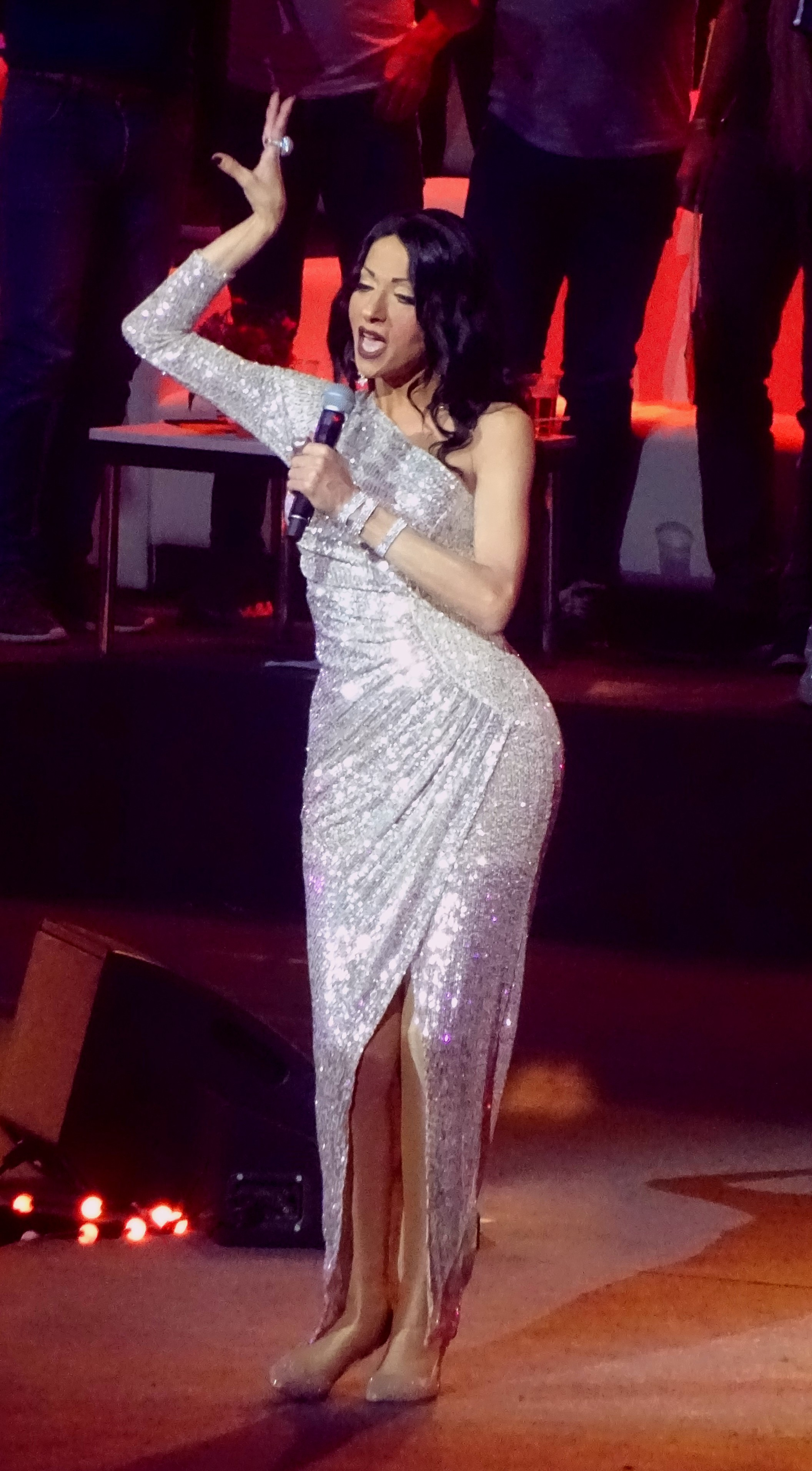
Dana International, pictured in 2019, won the 43rd Eurovision Song Contest, held in Birmingham.

Presented by Dana International. Opening titles: "Let Me Entertain You" by Robbie Williams. Ending credits: "The Rockafeller Skank" by Fatboy Slim.

The episode features:

- George Michael – gets arrested and comes out
- SunnyD
- Eurovision
- Cornershop – "Brimful of Asha"
- Fashion combat trousers
- Lock, Stock and Two Smoking Barrels
- Coronation Street – Free Deirdre (the campaign to free an iconic TV character after she was wrongly imprisoned for deception)
- There's Something About Mary
- South Park

=== I Love 1999 – broadcast 3 November 2001 ===
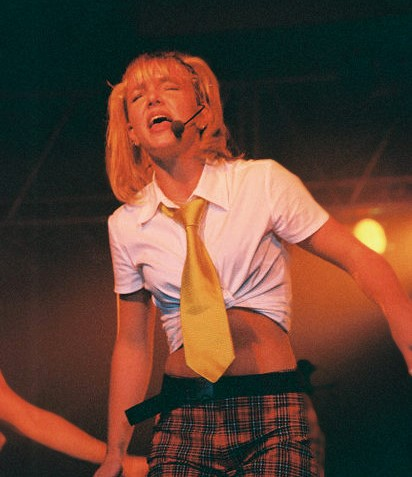
Britney Spears, pictured performing in 1999, achieved two UK number 1 singles – "Born to Make You Happy" and "...Baby One More Time".

Presented by Heather Donahue (from The Blair Witch Project). Opening Titles: "Praise You" by Fatboy Slim. Ending credits: "Livin' la Vida Loca" by Ricky Martin.

The episode features:

- Britney Spears (the emergence of a popular teenage American pop star)
- Flat Eric
- The Blair Witch Project
- Hello! magazine
- The wedding of Posh and Becks
- Kelly Brook on The Big Breakfast
- Spike Jonze directing the iconic video for Fatboy Slim's "Praise You"
- Queer as Folk
- Baz Luhrmann's hit "Everybody's Free (To Wear Sunscreen)", playing over a montage of the previous "I Love..." shows from 1970 to 1999.

== See also ==
- I Love the '70s
- I Love the '80s

Preceded by I Love the '80s (British TV series)	I Love the '90s (British TV series)
