= List of British films of 2001 =

A list of British films released in 2001.

Title	Director	Cast	Genre	Notes
The 51st State	Ronny Yu	Samuel L. Jackson, Robert Carlyle, Emily Mortimer, Ricky Tomlinson	Action/crime	
Another Life	Philip Goodhew	Ioan Gruffudd, Natasha Little	Drama	
Back to the Secret Garden	Michael Tuchner	Joan Plowright, George Baker	Family	
Beginner's Luck	James Callis, Nick Cohen	Julie Delpy, Steven Berkoff	Drama	
Birthday Girl	Jez Butterworth	Nicole Kidman, Ben Chaplin	Comedy/drama	
Black Hawk Down	Ridley Scott	Josh Hartnett, Eric Bana, Ewan McGregor, Tom Sizemore, William Fichtner, Sam Shepard	War	Co-production with the US
Blow Dry	Paddy Breathnach	Alan Rickman, Natasha Richardson	Comedy	
Bride of the Wind	Bruce Beresford	Sarah Wynter, Jonathan Pryce	Historical drama	
Bridget Jones's Diary	Sharon Maguire	Renée Zellweger, Hugh Grant, Colin Firth	Comedy	
The Bunker	Rob Green	Jason Flemyng, Andrew Tiernan, Jack Davenport, Andrew Lee Potts	Drama	
Captain Corelli's Mandolin	John Madden	Nicolas Cage, Penélope Cruz	Drama	Co-production with France and the US
The Cat's Meow	Peter Bogdanovich	Kirsten Dunst, Cary Elwes, Eddie Izzard	Drama	Co-production with Germany and the United States
Charlotte Gray	Gillian Armstrong	Cate Blanchett, Michael Gambon	Drama	
Christmas Carol: The Movie	Jimmy T. Murakami	Simon Callow, Kate Winslet, Nicolas Cage	Animation	
Cradle of Fear	Alex Chandon	Dani Filth, Emily Booth	Horror	
Crush	John McKay	Andie MacDowell, Imelda Staunton	Comedy/drama	
The Emperor's New Clothes	Alan Taylor	Ian Holm, Iben Hjejle	Historical	
Enigma	Michael Apted	Dougray Scott, Kate Winslet, Jeremy Northam	World War II/thriller	
The Fourth Angel	John Irvin	Jeremy Irons, Forest Whitaker	Thriller	
Girl from Rio	Christopher Monger	Hugh Laurie, Vanessa Nunes	Romance	
Gosford Park	Robert Altman	Maggie Smith, Helen Mirren, Michael Gambon, Kristin Scott Thomas, Eileen Atkins, Clive Owen, Kelly Macdonald, Emily Watson	Drama	Winner of the Best Original Screenplay Academy Award
Hannibal	Ridley Scott	Anthony Hopkins, Julianne Moore, Ray Liotta, Frankie R. Faison, Giancarlo Giannini, Francesca Neri, Gary Oldman	Psychological horror crime thriller	Co-production with Germany and the United States
Harry Potter and the Philosopher's Stone	Chris Columbus	Daniel Radcliffe, Rupert Grint, Emma Watson	Fantasy	
High Heels and Low Lifes	Mel Smith	Kevin McNally, Minnie Driver	Comedy/action	
The Hole	Nick Hamm	Thora Birch, Desmond Harrington	Horror	
Hotel	Mike Figgis	Saffron Burrows, Salma Hayek, Lucy Liu, Burt Reynolds	Drama	
Inferno	Paul Kousoulides	Emily Booth, Sanjeev Bhaskar	Sci-fi	Short film
Iris	Richard Eyre	Judi Dench, Kate Winslet, Jim Broadbent	Biographical drama	Winner of the Best Supporting Actor Academy Award
Jump Tomorrow	Joel Hopkins	Tunde Adebimpe, Hippolyte Girardot, Natalia Verbeke	Comedy	
Last Orders	Fred Schepisi	Michael Caine, Tom Courtenay	Drama	
Late Night Shopping	Saul Metzstein	Luke de Woolfson, James Lance	Drama	
Lagaan	Ashutosh Gowariker	Aamir Khan, Gracy Singh, Rachel Shelley, Paul Blackthorne	Historical Sports	
Lover's Prayer	Reverge Anselmo	Kirsten Dunst, Julie Walters	Period drama	
The Luzhin Defence	Marleen Gorris	John Turturro, Emily Watson	Drama	
The Martins	Tony Grounds	Lee Evans, Kathy Burke	Comedy	
Me Without You	Sandra Goldbacher	Anna Friel, Michelle Williams	Drama	
Mean Machine	Barry Skolnick	Vinnie Jones, Jason Statham	Sports	Remake of the US film The Longest Yard
Mike Bassett: England Manager	Steve Barron	Ricky Tomlinson, Amanda Redman	Sports/comedy	
My Kingdom	Don Boyd	Richard Harris, Lynn Redgrave	Crime	
Phoenix Blue	Tony Maylam	Amanda Donohoe, James Murray, Emily Hamilton	Thriller	
Strictly Sinatra	Peter Capaldi	Ian Hart, Kelly Macdonald	Drama	
Triumph of Love	Clare Peploe	Mira Sorvino, Ben Kingsley	Comedy	Co-production with Italy and Germany

== See also ==
- 2001 in film
- List of 2001 box office number-one films in the United Kingdom
- 2001 in British music
- 2001 in British radio
- 2001 in British television
- 2001 in the United Kingdom
