= The Studio (TV channel) =

- Country: United Kingdom
- Broadcast area: United Kingdom, Ireland

Programming
- Language(s): English
- Picture format: 576i (SDTV)

Ownership
- Owner: NTL/Vivendi Universal

History
- Launched: 1 February 2001
- Closed: 31 December 2002

The Studio was a cable television film channel in the United Kingdom and Ireland. It was a joint venture between NTL and Vivendi Universal who each had a 50 percent share.

== Overview ==
The Studio was announced on 29 September 2000 amid speculation that some Hollywood-based film studios were planning to launch subscription film channels through BSkyB. Ahead of its launch the channel was subject to analysis from the European Commission, who found that the film service would neither create nor reinforce a dominant position in any market.

The channel launched as a basic subscription service on 1 February 2001 on NTL's analogue cable TV platform, appearing on ntl's digital service on 7 February It launched on NTL Ireland's digital platform in January 2002. At its launch The Studio had access to around 1,000 films, with a selection of both classic titles, as well as newer releases. Films from Universal Pictures included Born on the Fourth of July, Carlito's Way, Babe, Leaving Las Vegas and Shine. Movies would also be packaged into blocks and strands to attract particular viewers.

NTL had hoped to launch The Studio on other platforms but its failure to do so meant the channel did not reach the number of viewers a deal with another provider would have allowed.

In May 2001, NTL attempted to sell its stake in The Studio in an effort to stem heavy losses, while Vivendi also began to run into trouble. With NTL and Vivendi deciding the channel was not financially viable despite meeting its financial targets, it was announced on 18 December 2002 that The Studio would close at the end of the month.

The channel continued until the late evening of 31 December 2002, closing after 22 months on air. NTL had agreed to provide a guarantee of £4.2 million in the event of termination of the joint venture, with closure costs totalling £4.8 million.

== See also ==
- Studio Universal
