= Extinct (2001 TV series) =

British television series from 2001

- Genre: Documentary
- Directed by: Jenny Ash; Russell Barnes
- Narrated by: Alun Armstrong
- Country of origin: United Kingdom
- Original language: English
- No. of seasons: 1
- No. of episodes: 6

Production
- Executive producer: Jonathan Hewes
- Producer: Alex West
- Production locations: California; Iceland; Mauritius; Oregon; Tasmania
- Running time: 30 mins
- Production company: Wall to Wall

Original release
- Network: Channel 4
- Release: 25 September – 30 October 2001

Extinct was a Channel 4 TV series, that originally aired between 25 September to 30 October 2001. There were 6 episodes.

== Episodes ==
1. Dodo

This episode recounts how the dodo became extinct. It starts with the introduction of people on the island of Mauritius. Animals are soon introduced that make life harder for the already endangered dodos. The settlers even tried to eat a dodo, but it was too chewy and tasted horrible. The episode explains how the dodo bred as well and recreates a flock of them eating fruit and snails, however, overhunting and competition with pigs, dogs, macaques, goats, rats, and cats finally destroyed the dodo forever.

2. Sabre-tooth cat

The episode commences at the La Brea Tar Pits in California, USA. Hundreds of bones from sabre-tooth cats (also known as Smilodon) and other animals are shown and the process of how they became stuck in the tar is explained. The program then describes how life was for the sabre-tooth cat in the Ice Age. It explains how the climate warmed up and the woodland forests that the sabre-tooth depended on for cover when stalking prey disappeared. It shows a mother sabre-tooth trying to hunt for her two cubs, but fails due to the open spaces and more numerous bison herds. Starving, she abandons her cubs (in doing so, will never reproduce again) and goes for the easiest prey, dead animals in the tar pit. Her hunger overpowers her sense of caution and drives her to the edge of the black abyss...

3. The Irish Elk

The Irish elk (also known as Megaloceros) was hunted to extinction by early man. This episode describes how overhunting and climate change killed this wonderful creature.

4. The Great Auk

This episode discusses the tragedy of the great auk, a puffin-like seabird killed by Europeans. Features a seabird ecologist, Dr Bill Montevecchi.

5. The Mammoth

The mammoth is one of the most iconic extinct creatures. The episode features palaeontologist Sylvia Gonzalez and describes how disease and overhunting killed a whole family of Columbian mammoths in Toquila, Mexico. The family was buried in a mass grave and ranged from babies to adults. The end of the Ice Age was also a major factor contributing to their extinction. Lush grasses began to be less common, and the pine trees that replaced them didn't have enough nutrients to sustain a mammoth's huge appetite. Thus, they were partially starved into extinction.

6. The Tasmanian Tiger

Perhaps the saddest extinction of all, this depressing episode tells the story of how one gunshot in Wilfrid Batty's gun not only ended the life of one of the last Tasmanian tigers but sounded the death knell for the entire species. The program covers basic anatomy of the marsupial and shows it hunting in the wild. It also shows actual footage of the animal in zoos. It is explained that the tiger's disappearance was due to the bounty system, in which the government paid everyone who killed a Tasmanian tiger 1 pound. When it was realized that the animal was becoming extinct, there was a rush to catch every last one and put them in zoos. Most zoo specimens died by the 1930s. The last tiger ever seen was "Ben", in Hobart Zoo. There were two final twists to this tale: "Ben" wasn't a male thylacine and, when she died in September 1936, "Ben" had endured her last 59 days as a protected species.
