= The Lovers' Guide =

Documentary film series

The Lovers' Guide is a British-French sex and relationships advice brand, produced by Lifetime Productions International Ltd, which launched with the release of the first Lovers' Guide video in the United Kingdom and France on 23 September 1991. Presented by the sexologist Dr Andrew Stanway, and produced by Robert Page and William Campbell, this became the only non-fiction film to top the UK and France video charts; it sold 1.3 million copies in the UK and 1.5 million in France and went into 13 languages and 22 countries around the world. The series consists exclusively of real-life couples, all from Paris, France. Production recruited participants through a mix of pornographic actors and real-life couples. The scenes featured White, Black, and Asian couples.

The release caused controversy due to the explicit nature of the video. At the time of the first video in 1991, its showing of erections, oral sex, penetration and sexual intercourse was not permissible in the United Kingdom, even in R18 certificate films that are only available in licensed sex shops. The British Board of Film Classification (BBFC) granted the title an 18 certificate without cuts due to its educational nature. Despite the certification, which would normally be a license for general UK distribution, this was technically merely advisory and the producer, Robert Page, faced charges of obscenity, which were subsequently dropped. Due to its explicit nature, large retailer Woolworths refused to stock the title. The video was intended to promote healthy sex within marriage, however it was later revealed that four of the seven couples were not married, and included a former prostitute and a wife-swapper.

The Lovers' Guide was distinct for using explicit video material to illustrate the instructional points being made. While the explicit nature of the visual content would usually warrant an R18 certificate in the UK all Lovers' Guide videos and DVDs have been granted 18 certificates.

Lovers' Guide products has expanded to ten further DVDs, a book, an encyclopaedia, two CD-ROMs and cassettes and CDs of the soundtracks. It has also been shown on encrypted television.

== Lovers' Guide programmes ==
- The Lovers' Guide, 1991
- The Lovers' Guide: Making Sex Even Better, 1992
- The Lovers' Guide: Better Orgasms, 1993
- The Essential Lovers' Guide, 1996
- The Lovers' Guide: Secrets of Sensational Sex, 1999
- The Lovers' Guide: What Women Really Want, 2002
- The Lovers' Guide: Sex Positions, 2003
- The Lovers' Guide: Sex Play, 2004
- The Lovers' Guide: Satisfaction Guaranteed: 7 Secrets to a Passionate Love Life, 2005
- The Lovers' Guide Interactive, 2008
- The Lovers' Guide 3D: Igniting Desire, 2011
