= Lynette Lithgow =

Trinidad-born British-based newsreader and journalist

Lynette Pearson (16 April 1950 – 11 December 2001), known professionally as Lynette Lithgow), was a Trinidad-born, British-based newsreader and journalist. Her first media job was as a broadcaster for Radio Television Brunei during the 1970s. During the 1980s, she moved to Britain. After working as a presenter for Midlands Today and a continuity announcer for Granada Television, Lithgow moved to London as a newsreader for the national BBC News in 1988.

Lithgow was one of the original presenters at BBC World Service Television when it launched in 1991 and she also presented BBC 2's Newsview. She left the BBC in 1996 upon gaining a law degree from the University of Oxford. She subsequently moved to the business news channel CNBC Asia (based in Singapore), where she worked until her death in Trinidad in December 2001.

== Murder ==
Lithgow was murdered, along with her 83-year-old mother, Maggie Lee, and her British brother-in-law, John Cropper, at the family home in Port of Spain. The family was found with their hands bound and their throats cut. A detective who spoke anonymously due to a rule forbidding police from contacting the media during an investigation said "I have visited a number of scenes in my career, but I never see anything as brutal or grisly as that."

While earlier reports stated that a "group of bandits" had ambushed the home, only two men were arrested and charged for their involvement in the crime: Lester Pittman and Daniel Agard. Both were convicted of murder in 2004, and sentenced to death; under Trinidadian law, murder convictions come with a mandatory death sentence. After several appeals, both Pittman and Agard had their sentences overturned in March 2010 due to a law prohibiting the executions of prisoners who had spent more than five years on death row. In December 2013, both were re-sentenced to a minimum of 40 years in prison.

== Personal life ==
Lithgow was married twice and had two children from her first marriage. Her second marriage, from 1998 until her death, was to Dominic Pearson.

In 2005, the Harvard Kennedy School established a fund in Lithgow's honor to support students interested in journalism.
