= Comedy Album Heroes =

BBC radio programme

- Genre: Comedy radio
- Running time: 30 minutes
- Country of origin: United Kingdom
- Language(s): English
- Home station: BBC Radio 4
- Starring: Greg Proops
- Original release: June 2001 – July 2003
- No. of episodes: 8

Comedy Album Heroes was a radio programme that aired from June 2001 to July 2003. There were eight half-hour episodes and it was broadcast on BBC Radio 4. It starred Greg Proops.
