= The Biggest Game in Town (game show) =

- Genre: Game show
- Presented by: Steve Le Fevre; Bobby Davro (stand-in)
- Starring: Ted Robbins
- Voices of: Richard Easter
- Country of origin: United Kingdom
- Original language: English
- No. of series: 1
- No. of episodes: 90

Production
- Production location: Granada Studios
- Running time: 30 minutes (inc. adverts)
- Production company: Granada Television

Original release
- Network: ITV
- Release: 10 September – 21 December 2001

The Biggest Game in Town was a British quiz show that aired on ITV between 10 September and 21 December 2001. The programme was broadcast live and was based on the game of bingo. It was presented by Steve Le Fevre.

== Premise ==
The programme was broadcast live on ITV each afternoon, originally at 1pm, but later moved to midday. On Fridays, an extra game was played at 5:30pm, which was known as the 'Friday Flyer'.

Each show featured two separate games that ran concurrently, a studio game between three contestants with a top prize of £5,550 and a home game with a daily jackpot pool of £5,000. Friday Flyer editions featured a larger home jackpot, starting at £7,500 plus any unclaimed cash prizes from the past week. The cash prizes in the studio game were also doubled but the top prize remained the same.

There was also a viewer competition in each show with different prize on offer each time.

Bobby Davro stood in as host for three editions, including a Friday Flyer celebrity special, towards the end of the series when Le Fevre was unable to host due to illness.

== Studio game ==
The studio game was divided into three rounds with the main aim being the first to fill up their game board of 15 squares. Each correct answer put a ball in one of the empty spaces of the game board, whilst incorrect answers resulted in contestants being frozen out of the next question, this was later changed to having a ball removed from their board.

=== Round 1 ===
In the first round, contestants played to fill the four corners on their game board. Questions were based on the past day's news stories (or the past week's events in Friday Flyer editions), with £250 (£500 in Friday Flyer editions) won for the first to fill all four corners.

=== Round 2 ===
In the second round, contestants played to fill the middle line of their game board. Questions were on various subjects of entertainment, usually movies, music and television. Some of the questions in this round were based on programmes being shown on ITV1 that evening. £500 was won (£1,000 in Friday Flyer editions) for the being the first to fill the middle line.

=== Round 3 ===
The third and final round of the main game saw contestants compete to fill the remaining spaces on their board with all questions being on general knowledge. The first to fill their board or with the most balls on their board when a time up klaxon sounded won the game. A full house was worth £1,000 to the contestant, otherwise an extra £50 was added to their winnings per each ball added in that round. These values were doubled to £2,000 and £100 respectively in Friday Flyer editions.

=== End Game ===
The winner of the studio game had 45 seconds to fill a cash board with three different amounts - £50, £500 and £5,000 - hence the show's top prize of £5,550. Every correct answer added one digit to the board and if the board was filled in time, the entire £5,550 was won, otherwise the contestant went away with the total value of the cash filled on the board, e.g. if the contestant filled in the £50 the £500 values but only filled the 5 and first zero of the £5,000 value, their total winnings for the round would be £600.

== Home game ==
The home game was done in the more traditional bingo standard of crossing off numbers on their board. In order to be within a chance of winning either the entire or a share of the jackpot pool, they had to register their game card by telephoning a hotline number before the show began. Game cards were available on a three week basis, each containing three weeks worth of game boards, and they were only available to collect for free by the show's internet website to be mailed to the recipient's home address.

In each game, every correct answer in the studio generated a number between 1 and 45 for home players to mark on their card. When each round in the studio game was completed, double numbers were generated for the home game and later editions saw double numbers used for every correct answer in the final round. A live leaderboard was used to track the progress of those who had registered their cards to play during the game.

The game was designed in such a way that a home winner was always determined first before that day's winner of the studio game.

Midway during the show's run, the voiceover artist Richard Easter, doubled as a co-presenter from the studio gallery, recapping the numbers generated before the advert break, and then giving an update on the location of the jackpot winners at the end of the show. On Friday Flyer editions, this role was taken up by Ted Robbins.

== Demise ==
The show was not recommissioned at the conclusion of the original series. Whilst no apparent reason was given, it has been suggested that low uptake of the home game was part of the reason for its abrupt cancellation, many viewers were reluctant in having to call a paid telephone line each day in order to take part.
