= I Love the '80s (British TV series) =

2001 British TV series

- Opening title
- Country of origin: United Kingdom
- No. of series: 1
- No. of episodes: 10

Production
- Producer: BBC
- Running time: 90 minutes

Original release
- Network: BBC Two
- Release: 13 January – 24 March 2001

Related
- I Love the '70s (British version); I Love the '90s (British version)

I Love the '80s is a BBC television nostalgia series that examines the pop culture of the 1980s. It was commissioned following the success of I Love the '70s and is part of the I Love... series. I Love 1980 premiered on BBC Two on 13 January 2001 and the last, I Love 1989, on 24 March 2001. Unlike with I Love the '70s, episodes were increased to 90 minutes long. The series was followed later in 2001 by I Love the '90s. The success of the series led to VH1 remaking the show for the American market: I Love the '80s USA, which is known simply as I Love the '80s in the US itself. The following repeat version in 2001 was cut down to an hour per year, then in 2019, the series was repeated again, this time cut down into a 30 minutes per year "highlights" version removing certain pop-culture and/or contributors.

== Contributors ==
The series used many regular contributors, which included Peter Kay, Clare Grogan, Dee Hepburn, Kate Thornton, Stuart Maconie, Emma B, Ice-T, Toyah Willcox, Tommy Vance, Tara Palmer-Tomkinson, Ross Noble, Jamie Theakston, and many others.

== Episode guide ==
=== I Love 1980 – broadcast 13 January 2001 ===
Presented by Larry Hagman. Opening titles and introduction to show: "Call Me" by Blondie. Ending credits: "Jump to the Beat" by Stacy Lattisaw.

- Fame
- The end of disco
  - The Gap Band – "Oops Up Side Your Head"
  - Liquid Gold
  - Kelly Marie
- Diff'rent Strokes
- Pac-Man
- Metal Mickey
- Kickers shoes
- Synthpop
  - The Human League
  - OMD
- Pierrot
- Roald Dahl's Tales of the Unexpected
- Alton Towers
- Clothing labels
  - Pringle
  - Kappa
  - Fred Perry
- Training Dogs the Woodhouse Way
- Catsuit / Sheena Easton
- The Face
- Moscow Olympic Games (the first to be hosted in a communist country)
- Who shot J. R.? / Dallas

Flashback commercial of 1980: Monster Munch – Three Monsters (actually aired in 1978).

=== I Love 1981 – broadcast 20 January 2001 ===
Presented by Adam Ant. Opening titles and introduction to show: "Prince Charming" by Adam and the Ants. Ending credits: "Swords of a Thousand Men" by Tenpole Tudor.

- Adam and the Ants
- Magnum, P.I.
- Wedding of Charles, Prince of Wales, and Lady Diana Spencer
- Valentine's Day
- Porky's
- Shakin' Stevens
- Danger Mouse
- Executive toys
- Kim Wilde
- Eric Bristow and Bullseye
- Chocolate biscuits
- New Romantic
- Pencil case, smelly rubbers, food stationery
- Protect and Survive and Threads (originally aired in 1984)
- Gregory's Girl / Clare Grogan

Flashback commercial of 1981: Kit Kat – Pop Band (actually aired in 1984).

=== I Love 1982 – broadcast 3 February 2001 ===
Presented by Dave Lee Travis, Mike Read and Tommy Vance in TOTP set. Opening titles and introduction to show: "Fantastic Day" by Haircut 100. Ending credits: "Poison Arrow" by ABC.

- The Young Ones
- Hair styles: Mullet, Jheri curl
- Rambo
- Boy George
- Deely Bobber
- BMX bike
- Sandwich toaster
- Musical Youth
- E.T. the Extra-Terrestrial
- School uniforms
- Boys from the Blackstuff
- Bubble gum
- Bananarama
- Alex Higgins
- Rah-rah skirt
- Imagination

=== I Love 1983 – broadcast 10 February 2001 ===
Presented by Roland Rat. Opening titles: "Karma Chameleon" by Culture Club. Introduction to show: "Young Guns (Go for It)" by Wham!. Ending credits: "Calling Your Name" by Marilyn.

- Knight Rider
- Cabbage Patch Kids
- Flashdance
- True/smooching
- Roland Rat
- Leg warmers
- Wham!
- Sloane Rangers and Hooray Henrys
- He-Man and the Masters of the Universe
- Fitness craze
- Break dancing
- Just Seventeen
- Blockbusters
- Thriller

=== I Love 1984 – broadcast 17 February 2001 ===
Presented by Holly Johnson. Opening titles: "Two Tribes" by Frankie Goes to Hollywood. Introduction to show: "Sexcrime (Nineteen Eighty-Four)" by Eurythmics. Ending credits: "Wood Beez (Pray Like Aretha Franklin)" by Scritti Politti.

- The A-Team
- Nik Kershaw
- Roller disco
- Tucker's Luck
- Madonna
- Videotape / Video Nasties
- Torvill and Dean
- Trivial Pursuit
- Paul Weller / The Style Council / Jazz pop / Sade
- Robin of Sherwood
- Dungeons & Dragons
- Care Bears
- The Smiths / Morrissey
- Transformers
- The Brat Pack
- Katharine Hamnett (Slogan T-shirts)
- Frankie Goes to Hollywood

=== I Love 1985 – broadcast 24 February 2001 ===
Presented by Grace Jones. Opening titles and introduction to show: "Take On Me" by A-ha. Ending credits: "Let's Go Crazy" by Prince and the Revolution.

- Grace Jones
- Levi 501
- Arnold Schwarzenegger
- McDonald's (fast food chain which had arrived in Britain in 1974 but was peaking in popularity by 1985)
- Bruce Springsteen
- My Beautiful Laundrette
- "19"
- Dr. Martens
- Goth culture
- Max Headroom
- Spot creams
- Miami Vice
- Perfume
- Prince
- Amusement arcades
- Spitting Image
- Live Aid

=== I Love 1986 – broadcast 3 March 2001 ===
Presented by Patsy Kensit. Opening titles and introduction to show: "Walk Like an Egyptian" by The Bangles. Ending credits: "Ain't Nothin' Goin' on But the Rent" by Gwen Guthrie.

- Samantha Fox
- Essex girl
- Moonlighting
- Boxer shorts / Nick Kamen
- Crocodile Dundee
- Australian beer commercials
- Neighbours
- Men's bedroom designs
- Sigue Sigue Sputnik
- Panini (stickers)
- Absolute Beginners
- No Limits / Jenny Powell
- Power ballads
- Big glasses / Timmy Mallett
- Sunday Sport
- Five Star

=== I Love 1987 – broadcast 10 March 2001 ===
Presented by Richard E. Grant. Opening titles and introduction to show: "I Wanna Dance with Somebody (Who Loves Me)" by Whitney Houston. Ending credits: "Respectable" by Mel and Kim.

- Terence Trent D'Arby
- Shellsuit / Bumbags
- Going Live!
- Nouvelle cuisine
- Run DMC / Beastie Boys
- Withnail and I
- Head sports bags
- Network 7
- Puffball skirts
- Wall Street / Yuppies
- Thirtysomething
- Pump trainers
- Brookside
- Rick Astley

=== I Love 1988 – broadcast 17 March 2001 ===
Presented by Raphael and Leonardo of The Teenage Mutant Hero Turtles. Opening titles: "Get Outta My Dreams, Get into My Car" by Billy Ocean. Introduction to show: "The Only Way Is Up" by Yazz. Ending credits: "Tell It to My Heart" by Taylor Dayne.

- Bros / Brother Beyond
- Harry Enfield – Loadsamoney
- Teenage Mutant Ninja Turtles
- This Morning
- Florence Griffith-Joyner
- Quiz machine – Give Us a Break
- Second Summer of Love
- Prisoner Cell Block H
- Inflatables at football matches
- Viz
- Debbie Gibson / Tiffany
- Sumo
- Bill and Ted
- Car accessories: Garfield, Mooning Man
- The Hit Man and Her

=== I Love 1989 – broadcast 24 March 2001 ===
Presented by Jason Donovan. Opening titles: "All Around the World" by Lisa Stansfield. Introduction to show: "Pump Up the Jam" by Technotronic. Ending credits: "Days" by Kirsty MacColl.

- Den Watts
- Lycra body
- Jason Donovan
- Challenge Anneka
- Mike Tyson vs Frank Bruno
- Decorating paint
- Soul II Soul
- Dancing flowers
- Guns N' Roses
- Shirley Valentine
- Crop circles
- Neneh Cherry
- Game Boy / Tetris
- Lambada
- Bodyform / Tampax / Bodyform advert
- Madchester

Flashback commercial of 1989: Carling Black Label – Mission Impossible Squirrel.

== Repeats ==
The series was repeated on BBC Two in 2002. In 2019, the same channel broadcast edited episodes lasting thirty minutes.

== That Was the Year That Was ==
In 2023, the BBC made a new version of the series for Channel 5, again featuring a number of 'talking heads' analysing footage from the BBC archives on a single year. Unlike the original series, ten non-sequential years from 1968 to 1990 were picked as they were deemed to be the most controversial, while instead of having a different in-screen presenter each week, a voice over by Jan Leeming was used throughout the series. Debuting as Totally 1976: That Was The Year That Was on 23 September 2023, the programme was retitled as Controversially...That Was The Year That Was and Most Shocking Moments during its outings on the channel.

=== That Was the Year That Was 1980s episodes ===
- 1983: Most Shocking Moments (30 September 2023)
- 1984: Most Shocking Moments (13 January 2024)
- 1988: Most Shocking Moments (27 January 2024)

== See also ==
- I Love the '70s
- I Love the '90s

Preceded by I Love the '70s (British TV series)	I Love the '80s (British TV series)	Next: I Love the '90s (British TV series)
