= Slimcea =

British Brand

Slimcea was a British brand selling reduced calorie foods between 1959 and the mid-1990s. The brand was launched in 1959 by Procea Products, which became part of Cavenham Foods in 1965. It was sold to Spillers in 1975 which in turn was taken over by Dalgety plc in 1979.

The brand's flagship product was its reduced calorie bread, which was advertised with the tagline "Show them you're a Slimcea girl". The "Slimcea girls" featured in the advertisements were usually winners of national Slimmer Of The Year competitions. A reduced calorie sweetener was also produced under the brand, along with a number of less successful products such as UHT milk.
