= All Jokes Aside =

All Jokes Aside may refer to:

- All Jokes Aside (comedy club), comedy club in south-side Chicago
  - All Jokes Aside (film), documentary about the club
