= Roddy Piper =

Canadian professional wrestler and actor (1954–2015)

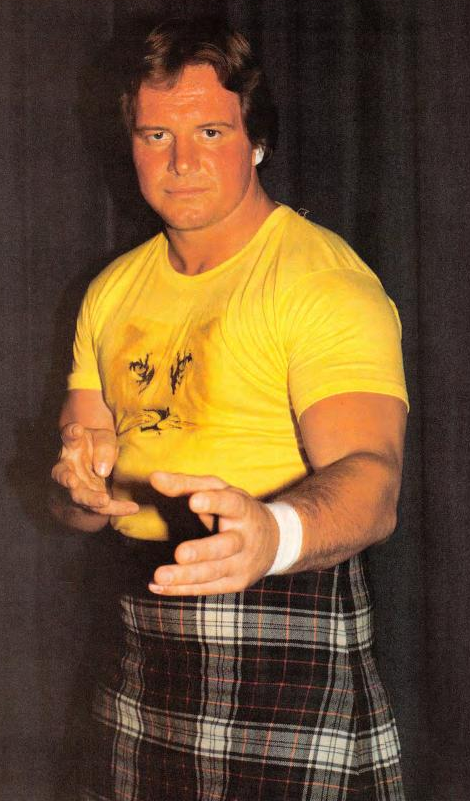
- Piper, c. 1983

Personal information
- Born: Roderick George Toombs; April 17, 1954 Saskatoon, Saskatchewan, Canada
- Died: July 31, 2015 (aged 61) Los Angeles, California, U.S.
- Cause of death: Cardiac arrest caused by hypertension
- Spouse: Kitty Jo Dittrich (m. 1982)
- Children: 4, including Teal Piper
- Family: Hart

Professional wrestling career
- Ring name(s): The Masked Canadian; Piper Machine "Rowdy" Roddy Piper
- Billed height: 6 ft 2 in (188 cm)
- Billed weight: 230 lb (104 kg)
- Billed from: Glasgow, Scotland
- Trained by: Gene LeBell; Leo Garibaldi; Tony Condello; Joe Fiorino; Stu Hart
- Debut: 1969
- Retired: 2011

Roderick George Toombs (April 17, 1954 – July 31, 2015), known by his ring name "Rowdy" Roddy Piper, was a Canadian professional wrestler and actor.

In professional wrestling, Piper was best known to international audiences for his work with the World Wrestling Federation (WWF, now WWE) and World Championship Wrestling (WCW) between 1984 and 2000. Although he was Canadian, Piper was billed as coming from Glasgow, Scotland and was known for his signature kilt and bagpipe entrance music, in reference to his Scottish heritage. Piper earned the nicknames "Rowdy" and "Hot Rod" by displaying his trademark "Scottish" short temper, spontaneity, and quick wit. According to The Daily Telegraph, he is "considered by many to be the greatest 'heel' (or villain) wrestler ever".

As one of wrestling's most recognizable stars, Piper headlined multiple pay-per-view events, including the WWF and WCW's respective premier annual events, WrestleMania and Starrcade. He accumulated 34 championships and hosted the popular WWF/WWE interview segment "Piper's Pit", which facilitated numerous kayfabe feuds. In 2005, Piper was inducted into the WWE Hall of Fame by Ric Flair, who dubbed him "the most gifted entertainer in the history of professional wrestling".

Outside of wrestling, Piper acted in dozens of films and TV shows. Most notably, he took the lead role of John Nada in the 1988 cult classic They Live, and a recurring role as deranged professional wrestler Da' Maniac on the FX comedy series It's Always Sunny in Philadelphia.

== Early life ==
Roderick George Toombs was born in Saskatoon, Saskatchewan, on April 17, 1954, the son of Eileen (née Anderson), a Scottish-Canadian and Stanley Baird Toombs, an Anglo-Canadian. He had family roots in British Columbia and Wisconsin, and was of partial Scottish descent on his mother's side. He was raised in Winnipeg, Manitoba, and attended Windsor Park Collegiate. His father was an RCMP officer while they lived in The Pas, Manitoba.

After being expelled from junior high school for having a switchblade and falling out with his father, Toombs left home and stayed in youth hostels. Several professional wrestlers hired him to run errands as he picked up odd jobs at nearby gyms. As a young man, he became proficient in playing the bagpipes, though he repeatedly stated that he was unsure exactly where he picked them up. His childhood and lifelong best friend was ex-NHL player Cam Connor.

Piper was an amateur boxer before he became a professional wrestler. He sometimes claimed to have won a Golden Gloves championship, though their lists of champions do not include any of his names. He was awarded a black belt in Judo from Gene LeBell.

== Professional wrestling career ==
=== Training and early career (1969–1975) ===
He started wrestling under the care of promoter Al Tomko in Canada, his first match involving "midget wrestlers" in front of a lumberjack audience in Churchill, Manitoba. He soon began earning money wrestling while still going to school. His first match in a famous organization was with Larry Hennig in the American Wrestling Association (AWA). Friends of his played the bagpipes during his entrance while he was handing out dandelions. Meanwhile, the ring announcer had to announce something, but all he knew was that Piper's name was Roddy. After seeing the pipe band, he announced, "Ladies and gentlemen, here comes Roddy the piper." This gave birth to the name "Roddy Piper".

From 1973 to 1975, Piper was a jobber in the AWA, NWA Central States territory surrounding Kansas City, and Eastern Sports Association in the Maritimes. He also worked in Texas for Paul Boesch's NWA Houston Wrestling promotion, and in Dallas for Fritz Von Erich's Big Time Rasslin.

=== National Wrestling Alliance territories (1975–1983) ===
==== California and Portland (1975–1980) ====
In late 1975 and early 1976, Piper was a top villain for Mike and Gene LeBell's NWA Hollywood Wrestling. In 1977–78, he also started to work for Roy Shire's NWA San Francisco Wrestling in addition to remaining with the Los Angeles office, where Piper developed his Rowdy character. During this time, he made continuous insults directed at the area's Mexican community; he later promised to make up for this by playing the Mexican national anthem on his bagpipes only to anger the fans further by playing "La Cucaracha" instead, which in turn caused a riot. Piper also managed a stable of wrestlers in California.

In the Los Angeles area, Piper feuded with Chavo Guerrero Sr., and his father Gory Guerrero. Piper and Chavo Guerrero faced each other in several matches for the Jules Strongbow Memorial Scientific Trophy. Piper also defeated Chavo for the Americas Heavyweight Title. During the feud, Piper lost a hair match and had his head shaved. Piper appeared in several loser leave town matches and was forced to leave the territory. He also appeared in the territory as The Masked Canadian. In his first televised match as The Masked Canadian, Piper teamed with Chavo in a match against Black Gordman and Goliath for the Americas Tag Team Championship. Piper and Guerrero lost the match and faced each other two days later, with Piper defeating Guerrero for the Americas Heavyweight Championship. Piper wrestled as The Masked Canadian for several months until he was unmasked by Hector Guerrero.

By late 1978-early 1979, Piper left the California promotions for even more fame in Don Owen's Portland-based Pacific Northwest territory. He teamed with Killer Tim Brooks and Rick Martel to win the NWA Pacific Northwest Tag Team Championship. Piper also won the NWA Pacific Northwest Heavyweight Championship with victories over both Lord Jonathan Boyd and "Playboy" Buddy Rose.

==== Georgia and Mid-Atlantic (1980–1983) ====
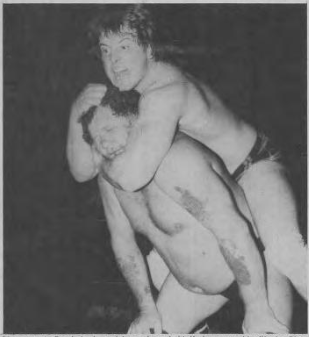
Piper applying a sleeper hold on Harley Race during a 1981 match

In the early 1980s, Piper ventured to Mid-Atlantic Championship Wrestling where he beat Jack Brisco for the NWA Mid-Atlantic Heavyweight Championship. He also defeated Ric Flair for the NWA United States Heavyweight Championship (Mid-Atlantic version) which turned into a feud.

From 1981 to 1982, Piper served as a commentator on Georgia Championship Wrestling (GCW) and feuded with the likes of Bob Armstrong, Dick Slater, and Tommy Rich. During the summer of 1982, Piper became a fan favorite after knocking out Don Muraco and Ole Anderson to save broadcast partner Gordon Solie from Muraco, who had grown angry at Solie questioning his tactics.

In Wrestling to Rasslin, Gerald W. Morton and George M. O'Brien described the transformation: "the drama finally played itself out on television when one of his [Piper's] hired assassins, Don Muraco, suddenly attacked the commentator Gordon Solie. Seeing Solie hurt, Piper unleashed his Scottish fury on Muraco. In the week that followed, like Achilles avenging Patroklas, he slaughtered villain after villain.... In the arenas fans chanted his name throughout his matches."

In 1982, Piper was fired because of showing up late for a match. He went to Puerto Rico for a month and was booked by Jim Barnett shortly thereafter. Piper returned to the Georgia area in the summer of 1983 to aid Tommy Rich during his rivalry with Buzz Sawyer. Eventually, Piper moved back to Jim Crockett Promotions. As a fan favorite, Piper feuded with Sgt. Slaughter, Ric Flair, and Greg Valentine. Piper's feud with Valentine culminated in a dog collar match at Starrcade '83: A Flare for the Gold. Valentine broke Piper's left eardrum during the match, causing Piper to permanently lose 50–75% percent of his hearing. This became known as "The Year of the Ear".

=== New Japan Pro-Wrestling (1977, 1978) ===
In August 1977, Piper debuted in New Japan Pro-Wrestling (NJPW) as part of its Toukon Series, teaming with Blackjack Mulligan in a loss to Antonio Inoki and Riki Choshu. Over the following weeks, he faced opponents including Inoki, Choshu, Seiji Sakaguchi, Kantaro Hoshino, and Osamu Kido. Piper returned to NJPW for a second tour in March 1978 as part of its Big Fight Series, this time wrestling under a mask as the "Masked Canadian". His bouts during the second tour included teaming with Masked Superstar in a loss to Haruka Eigen and Strong Kobayashi at the Tokyo Summerland and teaming with Ivan Koloff to defeat Haruka Eigen and Riki Choshu in Tokyo's Kuramae Kokugikan.

=== All Japan Pro Wrestling (1983) ===
Piper debuted in All Japan Pro Wrestling (AJPW) in May 1983 as part of its Grand Champion Carnival II series, teaming with Dick Slater to defeat Ashura Hara and Mighty Inoue. Throughout the tour, he primarily teamed with Slater to face opponents such as Genichiro Tenryu, Giant Baba, and Jumbo Tsuruta, with he and Slater unsuccessfully challenging Baba and Tsuruta for the NWA International Tag Team Championship. In his final match of the tour, he teamed with Bill Irwin in a loss to Ashura Hara and Takashi Ishikawa in Tokyo's Kuramae Kokugikan.

=== World Wrestling Federation (1979, 1984–1987) ===
==== Early appearances (1979) ====
Before entering the World Wrestling Federation (WWF) full-time in 1984, Piper wrestled five matches with the WWF under Vincent J. McMahon in 1979 at Madison Square Garden. In his first match for the WWF, he defeated jobber Frankie Williams on January 22. On an August 11 episode of All-Star Wrestling, Piper was presented as a babyface, wrestling Jose Estrada to a time-limit draw, and featured an appearance outside the ring by Captain Lou Albano who briefly attempted to taunt Piper. Before one match, Freddie Blassie stuffed Piper's bagpipes with toilet paper, so they would not play in front of the Garden crowd.

==== Piper's Pit (1984–1987) ====
In 1983, WWF owner Vince McMahon contacted Piper, who insisted on serving out his contract with Jim Crockett before starting his WWF run in 1984. Piper debuted in the WWF as a manager, working with "Dr. D" David Schultz and "Mr. Wonderful" Paul Orndorff, but eventually Piper's run as a manager quietly ended and he started wrestling full-time. Focusing on one of his strengths as a wrestler, the microphone, he was given his own interview segment called Piper's Pit on Championship Wrestling and Wrestling at the Chase in 1984, starting a run of the segment that ended in 1987. During one Piper's Pit, Piper insulted Jimmy Snuka's Polynesian heritage and attacked Snuka by smashing him over the head with a coconut. Piper also insulted Bruno Sammartino during a Piper's Pit segment, which led to a feud that ended in a steel cage match on February 8, 1986, at the Boston Garden which Piper lost.

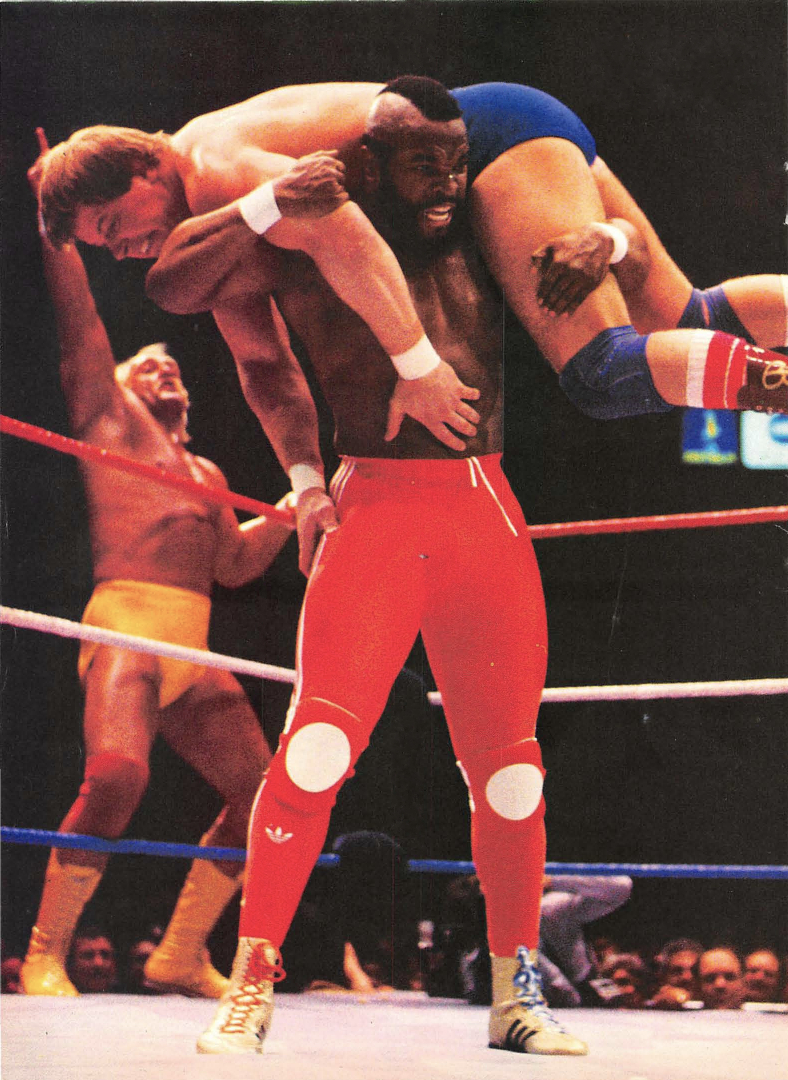
Mr T. hoists "Rowdy" Roddy Piper up onto his shoulders as Hulk Hogan cheers in the background during the main event of WrestleMania I in 1985

Piper's next major storyline was with Hulk Hogan and also involved pop singer Cyndi Lauper. In 1985, MTV broadcast The War to Settle the Score, which featured a main-event match between Piper and Hogan for the WWF championship. Hogan was accompanied to the ring by Lauper, Captain Lou Albano, and Mr. T. This event set up the first WrestleMania, which pitted Paul Orndorff and his former manager Piper against Hogan and Mr. T.

Orndorff was pinned by Hogan when Piper's bodyguard "Cowboy" Bob Orton interfered and mistakenly struck Orndorff instead of Hogan. In Born to Controversy, Piper recalled how during the match he had to keep Mr. T busy to cover Mr. T's lack of wrestling ability from being seen by the fans. From this situation, Piper and Mr. T's real-life relationship became hostile, leading to the inevitable conclusion that they be put into a feud with one another on-screen. Piper faced Mr. T in a boxing match at WrestleMania 2 in 1986, which Piper lost by disqualification after bodyslamming Mr. T.

Following a leave of absence from the WWF, Piper returned as a face. As part of the storyline, the returning Piper was distressed to find his Piper's Pit segment replaced by The Flower Shop, a segment hosted by Adrian Adonis, who had also hired Piper's former bodyguard Orton. During a TV taping of Championship Wrestling on August 23, 1986, against A. J. Petrucci, he was cheered and given a standing ovation by the crowd. Piper spent weeks crashing Adonis' show and trading insults, leading to a "showdown" between the two segments that ended with Piper being assaulted and humiliated by Adonis, Orton, and Don Muraco and the destruction of the original Piper's Pit set, resulting in Piper's face turn and the construction of a more permanent Piper's Pit set. In response, Piper stormed the set of Adonis' show and destroyed it with a baseball bat. This led to their Hair vs. Hair match at WrestleMania III, which was billed as Piper's retirement match from wrestling before he left to become an actor full-time. Piper won the match.

In early 1987, Piper's Pit also served as the backdrop for Andre the Giant's heel turn and challenging Piper's old foe, Hulk Hogan, for the WWF World Heavyweight Championship at WrestleMania III, and Hogan ultimately accepting the challenge.

=== Return to WWF (1989–1996) ===
==== Babyface Run and Intercontinental Champion (1989–1992) ====
In 1989, Piper returned from a two-year hiatus. Although WrestleMania V was billed as his return, he actually made his first appearance on March 19 in Denver, CO at a house show when he hosted a live Piper's Pit and interviewed Brother Love. Two weeks later at WrestleMania V he made his official return with another live Piper's Pit, where he hosed down a smoking Morton Downey Jr. with a fire extinguisher. He made his return to the ring on May 12, substituting for Jake Roberts and pinning Ted DiBiase on a house show in Los Angeles. Piper gained several more victories against DiBiase that month, and also against Randy Savage in June.

After this, Piper co-hosted Prime Time Wrestling from July 17, 1989, to December 25, 1989, with Gorilla Monsoon, feuding with Bobby Heenan, "Ravishing" Rick Rude, and Brother Love, he would return to the show in 1991 as well. Piper returned to the ring when he interfered in Rude's WWF Intercontinental Heavyweight Championship defense against Ultimate Warrior at SummerSlam, costing Rude the title. The feud was heavily promoted on TV and Piper would face Rude in many matches throughout the house show tours, including steel cage and lumberjack matches. The feud was so prominent that a Survivor Series match was built around it, which saw both men captain a team and simultaneously be eliminated by countout during their brawl, though Rude's team won the match.

The feud came to a head on Prime Time Wrestling, during an on-air bet between Heenan and Piper, which Piper won, resulting in Heenan having to dress as Santa Claus during the next episode of Prime Time. The feud continued until March 1990 with Piper winning the majority of their matches throughout 89-90 including a win over Bobby Heenan. He then feuded with Bad News Brown, who was upset at being eliminated by Piper at the 1990 Royal Rumble. Brown would go on to mock Piper for wearing a "skirt".

At WrestleMania VI in April 1990, Piper cut a promo towards his opponent Bad News Brown before the match, with half his face and body painted black, and also wrestled Bad News while painted this way. Bad News would take this display of blackface as being offensive behind the scenes. The match ended in a Double Count Out, with the issue between the two never being resolved despite plans to the contrary. According to a behind the scenes interview, neither man was willing to lose to the other.

In 1991, he supported Virgil in his feud against "The Million Dollar Man" (Ted DiBiase). Later in 1990 Piper was involved in a motorcycle accident, but was still present at their matches at WrestleMania VII and SummerSlam. He renewed his feud with Ric Flair and at the 1992 Royal Rumble defeated The Mountie for his first, and only, Intercontinental Heavyweight Championship. He lost it soon after to Bret Hart at WrestleMania VIII. Following his title loss to Hart, Piper made a handful of appearances at television tapings for Wrestling Challenge and WWF Superstars. Four Piper's Pit segments were recorded - two with Steve Lombardi and two with Shawn Michaels. None aired, and Piper disappeared from the WWF. He made his return playing the bagpipes at SummerSlam.

==== Return and The Bottom Line (1994–1996) ====
He reemerged once again in 1994 at WrestleMania X as guest referee for the WWF World Heavyweight Championship match between Bret Hart and Yokozuna. During the match, commentator Jerry "The King" Lawler remarked that he hated Piper and continued to taunt Piper on his King's Court segment on Monday Night Raw, eventually culminating with Lawler bringing out a young, skinny impersonator in a Piper T-shirt and kilt and forcing him to kiss his feet. Enraged, Piper agreed to wrestle Lawler at the King of the Ring, where Piper emerged victorious. Piper wrestled as a fan favorite, and adding to the face attitude by donating part of his purse from the fight with Lawler to a children's hospital in Ontario.

In spring 1994, Piper began hosting a regular weekly segment on All-American Wrestling called "The Bottom Line" where he commented on various happenings in the WWF, as well as on his feud with Lawler. Piper's segment aired regularly until the Summer of 1994.

Leaving the WWF again, he briefly returned in 1995 at WrestleMania XI, once again in a referee capacity, for the submission-only match between Hart and Bob Backlund. After this match Piper became the host for the replay editions of WWF pay-per-views for a brief period of time, commenting on the matches that had just happened, before disappearing again a few months later.

==== President of the WWF (1996) ====
On the January 29, 1996, episode of Monday Night RAW, Piper returned for another regular role: he was named as interim WWF President after Gorilla Monsoon had to take a leave of absence due to an attack by Vader. On February 24, at a house show at East Rutherford, New Jersey, he made his first match appearance in almost two years. As a substitute for Razor Ramon, Piper defeated The 1-2-3 Kid after hitting him with a ring bell. He wrestled twice more against the Kid on house shows that month.

As president, one of Piper's first acts was to reinstate Ultimate Warrior back into the WWF after a letter campaign written in by fans. Piper had become the object of affection for Goldust. Enraged, Piper claimed he would "make a man" out of Goldust at WrestleMania XII. The match, dubbed a "Hollywood Backlot Brawl", began in a pre-taped segment, recorded in an alleyway, but Goldust jumped into his gold Cadillac and ran Piper over, ultimately escaping (allegedly) onto the highways of Anaheim. Piper pursued in his white Ford Bronco. The aerial footage shown was actually that of the O. J. Simpson "low-speed" chase from two years prior.

This was made clear by Piper himself, who recalled the event on an episode of Pipers Pit the Podcast. The two eventually arrived at the arena, where Piper disrobed Goldust in the ring, effectively ending the confrontation. With Gorilla Monsoon back in control of the WWF by the end of the night, Piper once again left the company. His final appearance came on the September 6, 1996, edition of Monday Night RAW, where footage was shown of him participating with other WWF wrestlers at the CNE "Experience" in Toronto.

=== World Championship Wrestling (1996–2000) ===
==== Feuding with nWo (1996–1998) ====
Piper joined World Championship Wrestling (WCW) in the fall of 1996. He made his surprise WCW debut as a fan favorite at the Halloween Havoc pay-per-view in October to insult the nWo leader and the World Heavyweight Champion Hollywood Hogan. On the November 18 episode of Nitro, Piper revealed that Eric Bischoff was a member of the nWo, which ended with the nWo members attacking him. On the December 9 episode of Nitro, Piper told Flair that he didn't need the Four Horsemen's help in beating Hogan and he was going to do it on his own. Piper defeated Hogan with his signature sleeper hold in the non-title main event of the company's flagship pay-per-view Starrcade, which earned him a title shot against Hogan for the World Heavyweight Championship at SuperBrawl VII, where Piper was defeated.

On the March 10, 1997, episode of Nitro, Piper and his family joined forces with Ric Flair and The Four Horsemen in their battle with the nWo. At Uncensored, Piper competed in a triangle elimination match where he captained a team of Horsemen Chris Benoit, Steve McMichael and Jeff Jarrett against the nWo and WCW's team of Lex Luger, Steiner Brothers and The Giant. His team lost the match. On the March 31 episode of Nitro, Piper and Flair agreed to team up and stand side by side to fight. Piper moved on to feud with other members of nWo.

At 1997's Slamboree, Piper, Flair and Kevin Greene defeated nWo members Scott Hall, Kevin Nash and Syxx in a six-man tag team match. The following month, at The Great American Bash pay-per-view, Piper and Flair unsuccessfully challenged The Outsiders for the World Tag Team Championship. on the June 23 episode of Nitro, Flair and the Four Horsemen turned on Piper and attacked him. This led to a match between Piper and Flair at Bash at the Beach, which Piper won.

Piper took a hiatus from television before making his return to WCW on the September 8 episode of Nitro, where he was appointed the new on-air Commissioner of WCW, which reduced his in-ring work. He briefly resumed his feud with Hulk Hogan, beating him in a steel cage match at Halloween Havoc. on the March 23, 1998, episode of Nitro, Piper and Randy Savage battled to a no contest. On the March 30 episode of Nitro, Piper defeated Hogan by disqualification. At the 1998 Spring Stampede pay-per-view, Piper teamed with The Giant in a loss to Hogan and Nash in a Baseball Bat on a Pole match.

At Slamboree, Piper served as the special guest referee in a match between Randy Savage and Bret Hart, which Hart won but the following night on Nitro, Piper changed his decision and declared Savage as the winner by disqualification. At The Great American Bash, Piper and Savage lost to Hogan and Hart in a tag team match by submission. After the match, Piper wrestled Savage in the next match, which Piper defeated Savage by submission.

On the September 7 episode of Nitro, Piper and Diamond Dallas Page defeated Sting and Lex Luger by disqualification. Piper teamed with Diamond Dallas Page and The Warrior as Team WCW in a WarGames match at Fall Brawl for an opportunity at the WCW World Heavyweight Championship at the following month's Halloween Havoc. Page won the match for his team. On the September 14 episode of Nitro, Piper confronted Bret Hart.

==== Storylines and departure (1999–2000) ====
On the February 8, 1999, episode of Nitro, Piper defeated Bret Hart to win his third United States Heavyweight Championship; the first two reigns being in JCP. Piper held the title for only two weeks as he lost the title to Scott Hall at SuperBrawl IX. At Slamboree, Piper defeated Flair by disqualification after Eric Bischoff reversed Flair's pinfall win, disqualifying Flair for hitting Piper with a foreign object, which had been ignored by biased referee Charles Robinson.

On the May 17 episode of Nitro, Piper called out Bischoff for what Bischoff did to him in 1996, before Bischoff apologised to him and WCW fans. Piper and Bischoff were interrupted by Randy Savage and his Team Madness, before Savage and Team Madness attacked him and Bischoff until Kevin Nash saved him and Bischoff. In June at The Great American Bash, Flair defeated Piper by disqualification for control of WCW after interference from Buff Bagwell. Upset with Bagwell getting him disqualified, Piper knocked Bagwell out and joined Flair as vice president, turning Piper heel for the first time in WCW.

At Bash at the Beach, Piper competed against Bagwell in a boxing match with Mills Lane as special guest referee which he lost. In late 1999, Piper returned to WCW programming as a face, in an angle with Vince Russo, who was now portraying himself as the "Powers That Be" (an unseen power that was controlling WCW).

At Starrcade, Piper was the special referee in the WCW World Heavyweight Championship match featuring Goldberg and Hart. Forced by Russo, Piper called for the bell when Hart locked in the Sharpshooter on Goldberg, when it was apparent that Goldberg had not submitted. The feud between Piper and the Powers That Be ended shortly after. Piper's last appearance in WCW was at SuperBrawl 2000 in February 2000 where he was a surprise referee in the WCW World Heavyweight Championship match between Sid Vicious, Jeff Jarrett and Scott Hall. In July 2000, WCW terminated Piper's contract.

=== Xcitement Wrestling Federation (2001–2002) ===
Before going to the WWE in 2003, Piper served as the commissioner of the Xcitement Wrestling Federation (XWF). On November 5, 2002, Piper revealed in his autobiography, In the Pit with Piper: Roddy Gets Rowdy, that he was released rather than having left as had previously been thought.

=== Return to WWE (2003) ===
Piper returned to WWE on March 30, 2003, by conducting a surprise run in during the Hulk Hogan-Vince McMahon match at WrestleMania XIX in Seattle, Washington, where he attacked Hogan with a steel pipe to cement his heel status; Hogan nevertheless eventually won the match. Piper went on to align with Sean O'Haire; at Backlash in April, Rikishi hit Piper with Piper's own coconut, but this led to O'Haire defeating Rikishi.

In May, as Hulk Hogan had been banned in storyline from television by Vince McMahon, Hogan returned under a mask as Mr. America, and continued his feud with Piper, O'Haire and McMahon, who tried to reveal Mr. America's true identity. This storyline also saw Piper tear off the fake leg of one-legged wrestler Zach Gowen, who was playing a Hogan fan. At Judgment Day, Piper argued with Chris Jericho if Piper's Pit was better than Jericho's talk show The Highlight Reel. Later at the event, Piper lost to Mr. America.

Piper and O'Haire then moved on to challenge Tajiri and Eddie Guerrero for the WWE Tag Team Championship, but in June 2003, WWE fired Piper after a controversial interview with HBO's Real Sports with Bryant Gumbel in which Piper discussed the darker side of the wrestling industry. WWE cited that "Piper stated that he used drugs for many years while working in professional wrestling and that he does not like the person that he becomes when he actively performs as a professional wrestler", and dismissed Piper because of "inability to reach agreement on a contract and to assist Piper from engaging in any self-destructive behavior". On his 2006 DVD, Piper claimed that HBO took parts of his interviews out of context to make wrestling look bad.

=== Total Nonstop Action Wrestling (2002–2005) ===
Piper debuted for Total Nonstop Action Wrestling (TNA) promotion on December 4, 2002, at an NWA-TNA pay-per-view and started a feud with Vince Russo, cutting a promo where he blamed Russo for the death of Owen Hart. From September to December 2003, Piper gave video-tape messages. On the October 8, 2004, episode of Impact!, Piper crashed the Impact Zone and announced his talk segment In the Pit with Piper.

In November 2004, at Victory Road, he hosted In the Pit with Piper and interviewed Jimmy Snuka, who refused to accede to Piper's demands of hitting Piper with a coconut. On the December 24 episode of Impact, Piper hosted another In The Pit with Piper and interviewed Hector Garza but was interrupted by Scott Hall and Kevin Nash. At Final Resolution in January 2005, Piper refereed a match between Jeff Hardy and Scott Hall, helping Hardy win. This was Piper's final appearance for TNA.

=== Second return to WWE (2005–2015) ===
==== WWE Hall of Fame and World Tag Team Champion (2005–2006) ====
On February 21, 2005, it was announced that Piper was to be inducted into the WWE Hall of Fame. Piper held an episode of Piper's Pit at WrestleMania 21 where he interviewed Stone Cold Steve Austin. On the July 11, 2005, episode of Raw, Piper received a superkick from Shawn Michaels, the guest for Piper's Pit. In October and November 2005, Piper feuded with Cowboy Bob Orton and Randy Orton, after they attacked him during a session of Piper's Pit with Mick Foley. While Piper defeated both Ortons in a handicap match and made Bob submit in a six-man tag match, the feud ended with Randy interfering in a singles match between Piper and Bob, disqualifying Bob, but beating down Piper.

Piper returned to Raw on September 11, 2006, for a six-man tag team match win with The Highlanders against the Spirit Squad. He also appeared on the Raw Family Reunion, along with Money Inc. and Arn Anderson to accompany Ric Flair ringside for a match against Mitch of the Spirit Squad. On November 5, Piper would gain what would be his final championship in WWE, winning the World Tag Team Championship with Flair from The Spirit Squad at Cyber Sunday. On the November 13, 2006, episode of Raw, Piper and Flair lost the title to Rated-RKO (Edge and Randy Orton).

==== Final feuds and retirement (2007–2011) ====
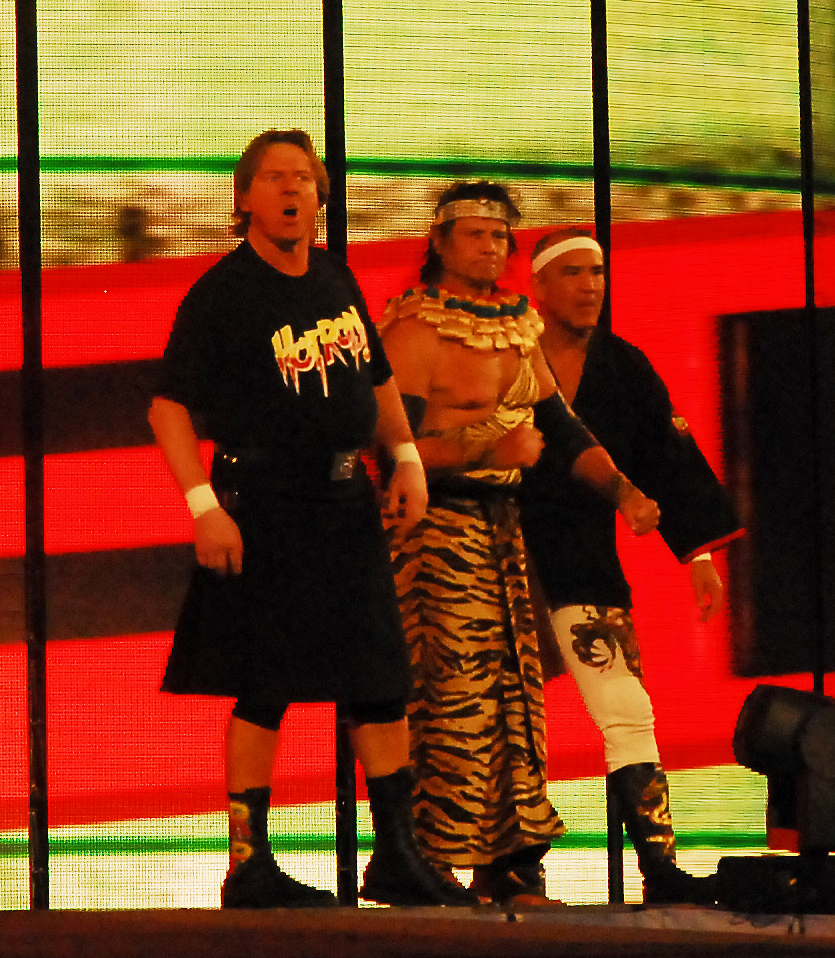
Piper with Ricky Steamboat and Jimmy Snuka before their match with Chris Jericho at WrestleMania 25 in 2009

In 2007, Piper appeared in February to announce Dusty Rhodes for the WWE Hall of Fame, and also in June for Vince McMahon Appreciation Night. In 2008, Piper made a surprise appearance in the Royal Rumble match by attacking Jimmy Snuka, but was eliminated by Kane. Piper then had a series of confrontations with Santino Marella in 2008, including on Jimmy Kimmel Live!. At Cyber Sunday (2008), Piper was one of three choices to be Santino Marella's opponent for the Intercontinental Championship, with The Honky Tonk Man being chosen. The match ended by disqualification and after the match Piper and Goldust made their way down to the ring confronting and attacking Marella.

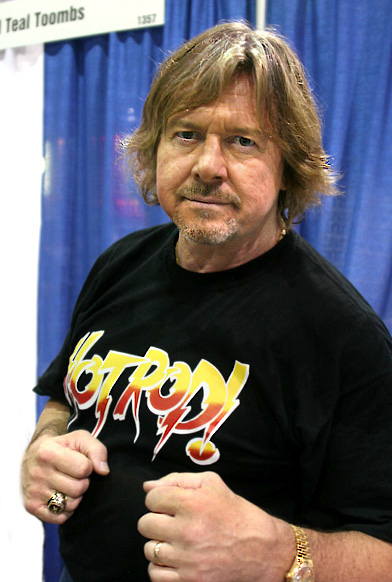
Piper in 2009

On the February 16, 2009 episode of Raw, after Chris Jericho insulted WWE legends, Piper interrupted him and was attacked by Jericho for it. The feud culminated in Jericho defeating Piper, Jimmy Snuka and Ricky Steamboat at WrestleMania 25 in a handicap elimination match. Piper later guest hosted Raw on November 16, 2009, at Madison Square Garden in New York City. Piper challenged Vince McMahon to a street fight later in the evening, but Randy Orton came out to fight in McMahon's place. Kofi Kingston came out to stop Randy's assault on Piper.

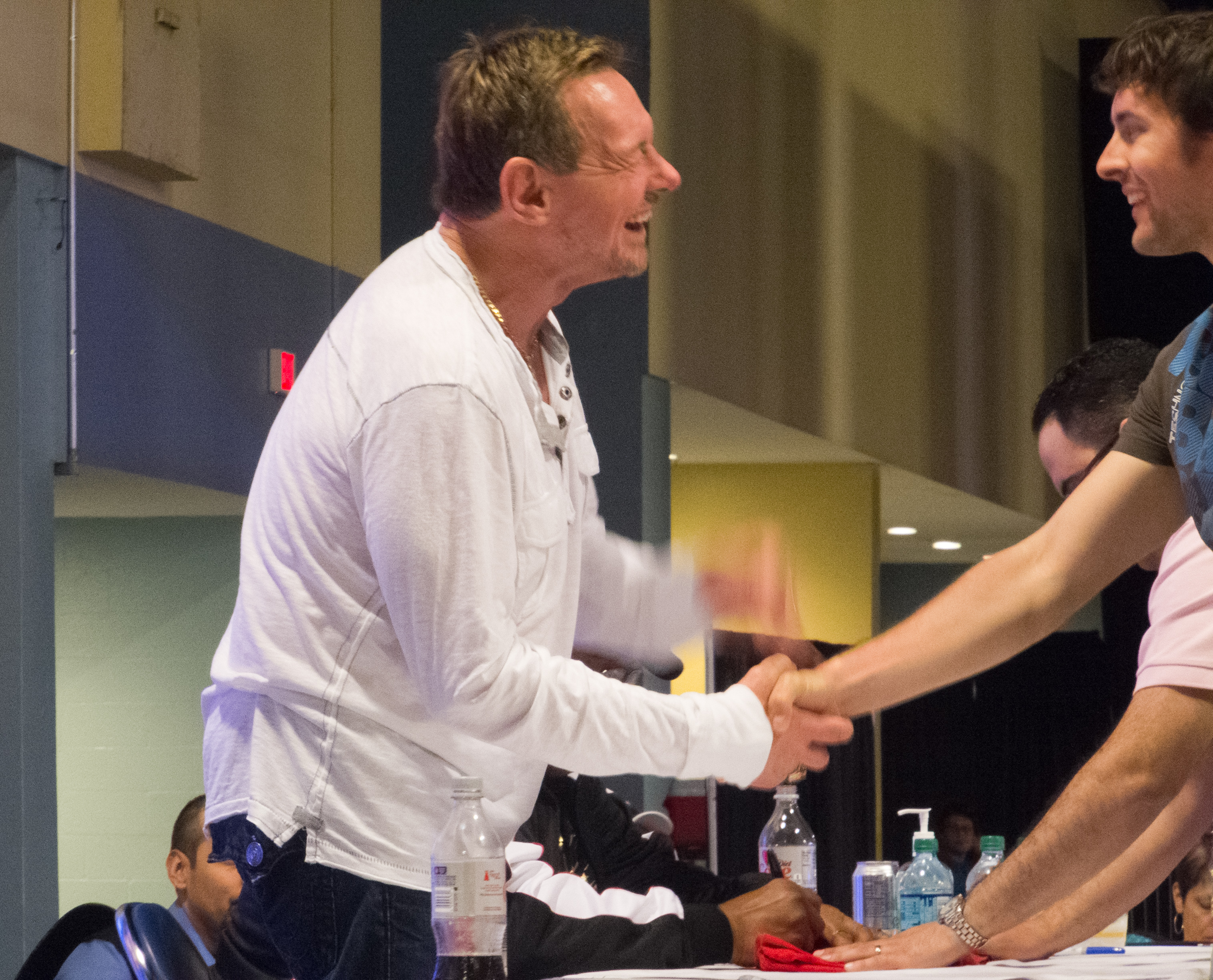
Piper in 2012

He inducted Wendi Richter into the 2010 WWE Hall of Fame on March 27, 2010. He also appeared the next night on Raw as one of the Legend Lumberjacks in a match that involved Christian and Ted DiBiase. Two months later, Piper hired DiBiase to capture guest host Quinton Jackson so he could "gain revenge on BA", but was unsuccessful.

At WrestleMania XXVII on April 3, 2011, Piper made an appearance by hitting Zack Ryder with a coconut while the latter was being interviewed. On the June 13, 2011 episode of Raw, The Miz and later Alex Riley were guests on Piper's Pit; this led to Piper defeating Miz in a match (to win $5000) because of help from Riley, the guest referee; this was Piper's last documented WWE match. John Cena was a guest for Piper's Pit on the November 28, 2011 episode of Raw.

==== Sporadic appearances and departure (2012–2015) ====
On the April 10, 2012 episode of SmackDown, Daniel Bryan and AJ Lee were guest of Piper's Pit. On the June 18 episode of Raw, Piper reunited with Cyndi Lauper. At Raw 1000, Piper and various other veterans helped Lita defeat Heath Slater. On the August 13, 2012, episode of Raw, Chris Jericho was the guest for Piper's Pit, but Dolph Ziggler and the Miz interrupted.

On the January 6, 2014 episode of Raw, The Shield were guests for Piper's Pit. On the March 31, 2014 episode of Raw, Piper hosted Piper's Pit with superstars who would compete in the André the Giant 31-man memorial battle royal, which ended in a brawl with Big Show clearing the ring and Piper raising his hand. At WrestleMania XXX, the four men who wrestled in the main event of WrestleMania I—Piper, Paul Orndorff, Hulk Hogan and Mr. T—buried the hatchet in a backstage segment. On the December 22, 2014 episode of Raw, Rusev and Lana were guests for the final edition of Piper's Pit. At WrestleMania 31, Piper and other legends appeared in a backstage segment after Daniel Bryan won the Intercontinental Championship.

In early July 2015, Ric Flair said Piper lost his WWE Legends contract with the company because of a public feud with Steve Austin, which resulted in Piper leaving PodcastOne. Piper later apologized to Austin on July 13, only three weeks before his death.

=== Later Career (2005–2012) ===
In February 2005 at WrestleReunion, Piper teamed with Jimmy Valiant and Jimmy Snuka against Colonel DeBeers, "Cowboy" Bob Orton, and "Playboy" Buddy Rose. On January 29, 2011, Piper made his debut for Pro Wrestling Guerrilla (PWG) during the WrestleReunion 5 weekend, defeating nineteen other men, last eliminating Terry Funk, to win the Legends Battle Royal.

Piper's last documented match occurred on August 12, 2011, at the JCW Legends and Icons event. What was originally a match for Piper against Terry Funk was altered mid-match to a tag match between Piper and Cowboy Bob Orton against Funk and Mick Foley, which Piper's team won.

In 2012, Piper, along with Don Coss, created Portland Wrestling Uncut, a revival of the original Portland Wrestling, with new and old wrestlers combined. Playing prominently in the show are Piper and Coss as announcers, The Grappler (Len Denton) as a manager, guest appearances by the likes of Matt Borne (among others), rewind segments that show partial matches from the original Portland Wrestling (owned by Don and Barry Owen), and Piper's son, Colt Toombs.

== Other media ==
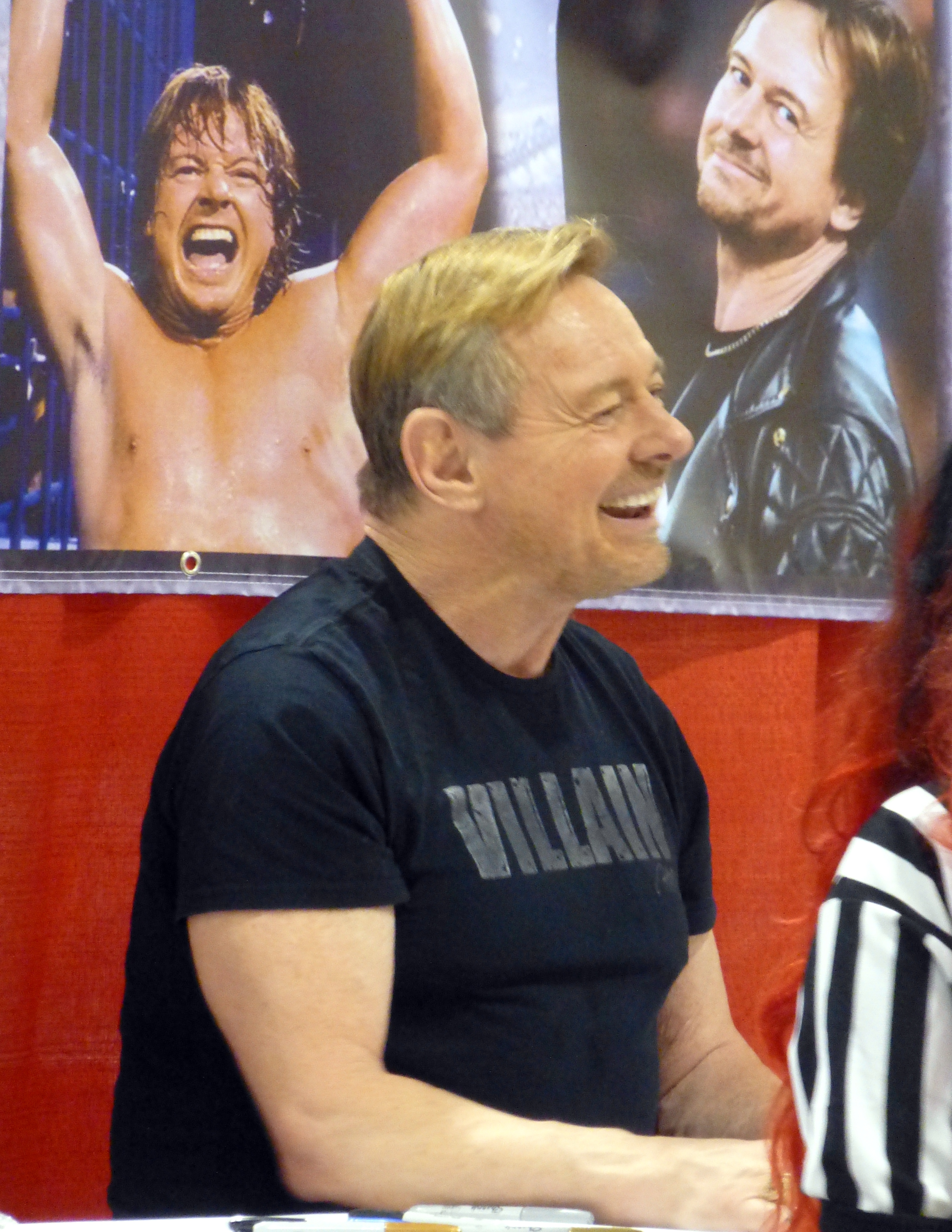
Piper in May 2015, two months before his death

=== Music videos ===
In the 1980s, Piper also appeared in singer Cyndi Lauper's music video for the song "The Goonies 'R' Good Enough". Piper performed the song, "For Everybody", on The Wrestling Album (Columbia Records, 1985), based on the Mike Angelo & the Idols song "Fuck Everybody", but without any of the profanity heard in the original. He also appeared as a guest VJ on MTV in 1988. In 1992, he released a UK only single and music video for his song, "I'm Your Man". The single came with the B-side, "Judy Come Back".

=== Acting and hosting ===
Deadline Hollywood wrote, "During and after his wrestling days, Piper racked up dozens of film and TV credits, starring in numerous action B-movies and later doing voice work". The most famous of Piper's acting exploits was in the 1988 science fiction film They Live, directed by John Carpenter, which spawned the catchphrase Piper came up with—"I have come here to chew bubble gum and kick ass. And I'm all out of bubble gum."—as well as the long fight scene over sunglasses against Keith David which took three weeks to rehearse. The line and the fight scene have since been parodied in Duke Nukem, South Park and Adventure Time. Entertainment Weekly wrote that Piper's role in They Live made him a "cult icon" and "some kind of legend". Rolling Stone wrote that Piper "had a memorable career as a cult actor", citing They Live and the 1987 film Hell Comes to Frogtown.

Piper was a guest on a 1985 Saturday Night Live episode, tormenting hosts Hulk Hogan and Mr. T, and appeared as a special guest on MADtv along with Bret Hart. In the early 1990s, Piper made guest-star appearances on two episodes of The New Zorro on The Family Channel. Piper had a role in a fourth season episode of the Superboy television series as an immortal Alchemist stealing the youth from his gym patrons. In 1991, Piper and Jesse "The Body" Ventura starred in Tag Team, a television film about two ex-professional wrestlers turned police officers. Piper appeared as a wrestler loosely based on himself in an episode called "Crusader" from Walker, Texas Ranger. Piper also appeared in an episode of The Outer Limits series.

Piper was the host of ITV's Celebrity Wrestling in the United Kingdom. Piper appeared on RoboCop: The Series.

Piper appeared in It's Always Sunny In Philadelphia as professional wrestler named "Da' Maniac" during season 5 and reprised this role in season 9. Although the character was a parody of Mickey Rourke's role in The Wrestler, Piper had previously endorsed The Wrestler and Rourke's performance during an appearance with Rourke on Jimmy Kimmel Live.

In 2008, he appeared as Mr. Thurgood in the low-budget film The Mystical Adventures of Billy Owens and its sequel Billy Owens and the Secret of the Runes in 2010. On March 14, 2010, Piper appeared in "One Fall", an episode in CBS's Cold Case, playing a wrestler named Sweet Sil. In September 2010, Piper appeared in a FunnyorDie.com video, fighting against childhood obesity in a PSA parody. The clip included him using wrestling moves on children eating junk food and the parents who feed junk food to their kids.

In 2012, Piper appeared on a Season 4 episode of Celebrity Ghost Stories, in which he conveyed a story of being visited by the ghost of Adrian Adonis. In May 2013, Piper appeared in "Barry's Angels"— episode 12 of the fourth season of the A&E reality show, Storage Wars —in which he appraised a set of Scottish kilts purchased by Barry Weiss. In June 2013, Piper appeared on Celebrity Wife Swap, where he swapped wives with Ric Flair.

Piper appeared as himself in the video game Saints Row IV. He also played himself as the protagonist in the 2013 film Pro Wrestlers vs. Zombies. In April 2014, Piper appeared as a regular cast member on the WWE Network original reality show Legends' House. He also started a podcast; Piper's Pit with Roddy Piper, in association with PodcastOne.

=== Voice acting ===
In 2006, Roddy Piper ventured into the realm of voice acting, providing the voice of himself in "Metal Militia"—an episode of Cartoon Network's animated series Robot Chicken—and the voice of The Pyro Messiah in the Night Traveler multimedia adventure series produced by Lunar Moth Entertainment. He provided the voice of Bolphunga in Green Lantern: Emerald Knights, and the voice of Don John in the Adventure Time episode "The Red Throne". He also voiced his own likeness in the 2013 video game Saints Row IV.

=== Toys ===
Piper is one of several real people to be immortalized with a 3.75 in (9.5 cm) G.I. Joe action figure of himself, as "Rowdy" Roddy Piper, the Iron Grenadier Trainer. The figure was released as an exclusive for the 2007 International G.I. Joe Convention from the Official G.I. Joe Collectors' Club. Piper appeared at the convention to sign autographs.

=== Video games ===
Piper appears as a playable character in 14 wrestling video games. He made his first appearance in WWF WrestleMania: Steel Cage Challenge. He later appeared in WCW/nWo Revenge, WCW/nWo Thunder, WCW Nitro, Legends of Wrestling II, WWE SmackDown! Here Comes the Pain, Showdown: Legends of Wrestling, WWE Day of Reckoning, WWE SmackDown! vs. Raw, WWE SmackDown vs. Raw 2007, WWE SmackDown vs. Raw 2008 and WWE All Stars as a legend. He also appeared in WWE 2K14 as a hidden character in the Superstar Head Creation mode. He was later included in WWE 2K16 as DLC. He also appears in WWE 2K19 as DLC in the game's Ric Flair-themed "Wooooo!" Edition, as well as in WWE 2K20, WWE 2K Battlegrounds, WWE 2K22, WWE 2K23, WWE 2K24, and WWE 2K25.

Outside of wrestling games, Piper voices a fictionalized version of himself in 2013's Saints Row IV. In the story, Piper helps the player rescue Keith David from a simulation by recreating their fight scene from They Live, and can be recruited as an ally during missions. Piper also made a cameo appearance in Abobo's Big Adventure.

== Personal life ==
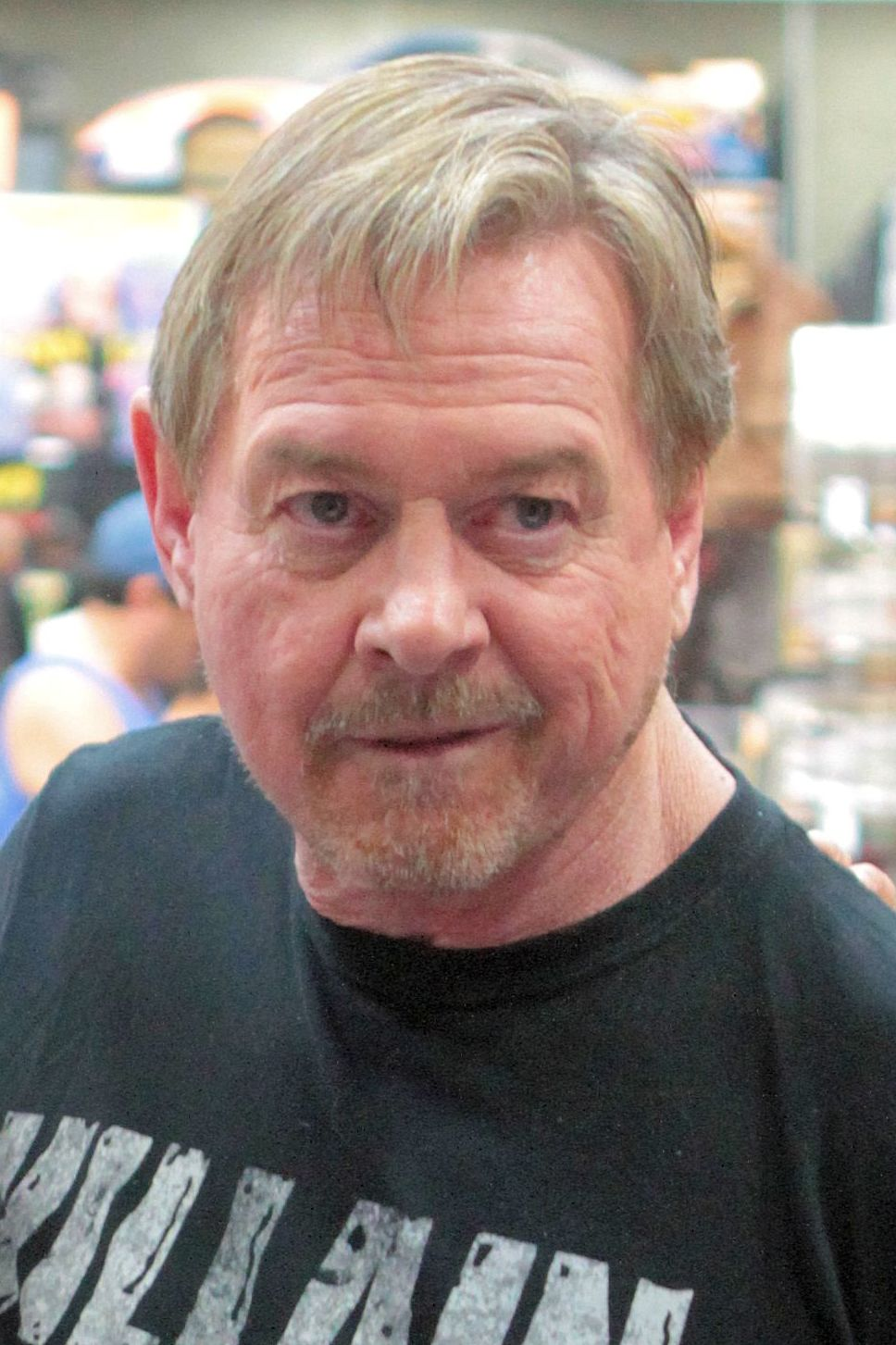
Piper in 2015

Toombs was a Christian. Toombs' last film that was released in his lifetime, The Masked Saint, was a biopic of wrestler-turned-Christian minister Chris Whaley. Toombs and his wife Kitty Jo Dittrich were married from 1982 until his death in 2015. They had four children. His daughter Teal Piper made her professional wrestling debut for All Elite Wrestling (AEW) in August 2019 at the All Out pay-per-view. Shortly after that announcement, it was revealed that she had signed a contract with Women of Wrestling (WOW).

On November 27, 2006, it was announced on WWE.com that Toombs had Hodgkin's lymphoma; he finished radiation therapy on January 15, 2007. This was also confirmed on Toombs' official website, where he posted messages of thanks to all his fans and stated that, had the fans not chosen him as Ric Flair's partner at Cyber Sunday, he would not have been taken to the hospital and diagnosed as having his disease in time.

In November 2008, a video spread around the internet showing Toombs smoking marijuana and taking a hit from a bong in front of a cheering crowd at the annual Gathering of the Juggalos, although he later acknowledged his use of medicinal marijuana "to alleviate the symptoms associated with cancer". This was reiterated on a blog from Jim Ross.

In his autobiography, Toombs claimed to be a cousin of Bret Hart, which would make him a relative of the Hart wrestling family. This fact was once used as a trivia question on Raw. Hart also revealed that Toombs was the only wrestler to visit him in the hospital after his stroke. Bruce Hart has stated that they were second cousins.

== Death ==
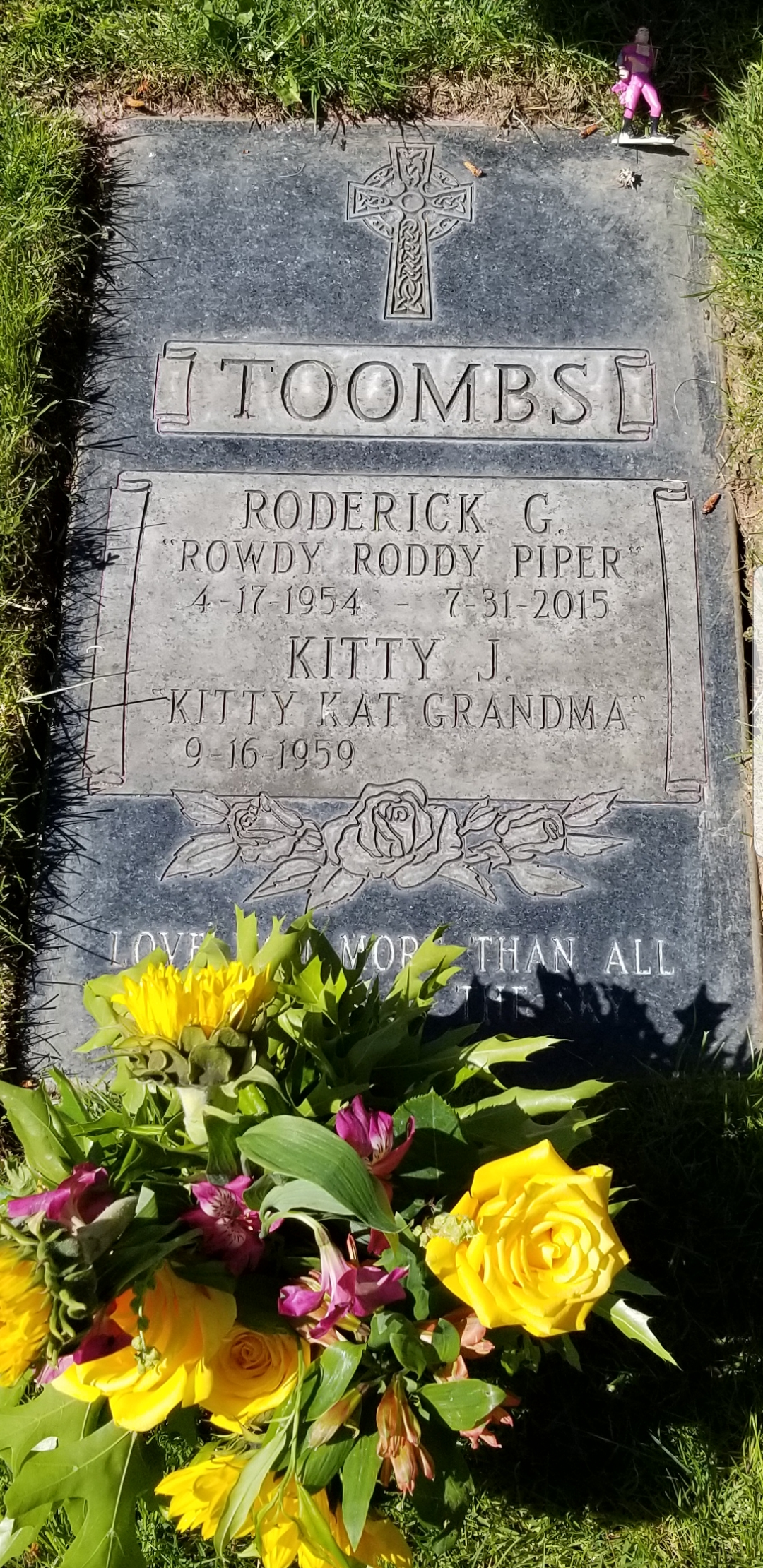
Roddy Piper's grave in 2021

On July 24, 2015, Piper appeared as a guest on The Rich Eisen Show. He had trouble collecting his thoughts and staying focused, often rambling and not answering Eisen's questions.

One week later on July 31, 2015, Piper died in his sleep at the age of 61 at his summer residence in Los Angeles, California. His death certificate cites a cardiopulmonary arrest caused by hypertension, listing a pulmonary embolism as a contributing factor; TMZ reported this as a heart attack caused by the embolism. Piper's long-time friend Bruce Prichard revealed on his podcast that he received a voicemail from Piper the night of his death.

News of his death broke minutes before the Hall of Heroes dinner to cap off the Mid-Atlantic Wrestling Legends FanFest in Charlotte, North Carolina, where about 600 current and former wrestling personalities and fans had gathered. He received a ten-bell salute after the planned salute to fellow former professional wrestler Dusty Rhodes, who had died the previous month. Another ten-bell salute was given at the beginning of the August 3, 2015, episode of Raw.

WWE CEO Vince McMahon said, "Roddy Piper was one of the most entertaining, controversial and bombastic performers ever in WWE, beloved by millions of fans around the world. I extend my deepest condolences to his family." Film director John Carpenter said, "Devastated to hear the news of my friend Roddy Piper's passing today. He was a great wrestler, a masterful entertainer and a good friend."

In an HBO Real Sports interview conducted by Piper in 2003, he had predicted that he was "not going to make 65" because of his poor health, and that he made his 2003 return to WWE because he could not access his pension fund until reaching the age of 65.

Piper was cremated and his ashes interred at Crescent Grove Cemetery in Tigard, Oregon.

== Legacy ==
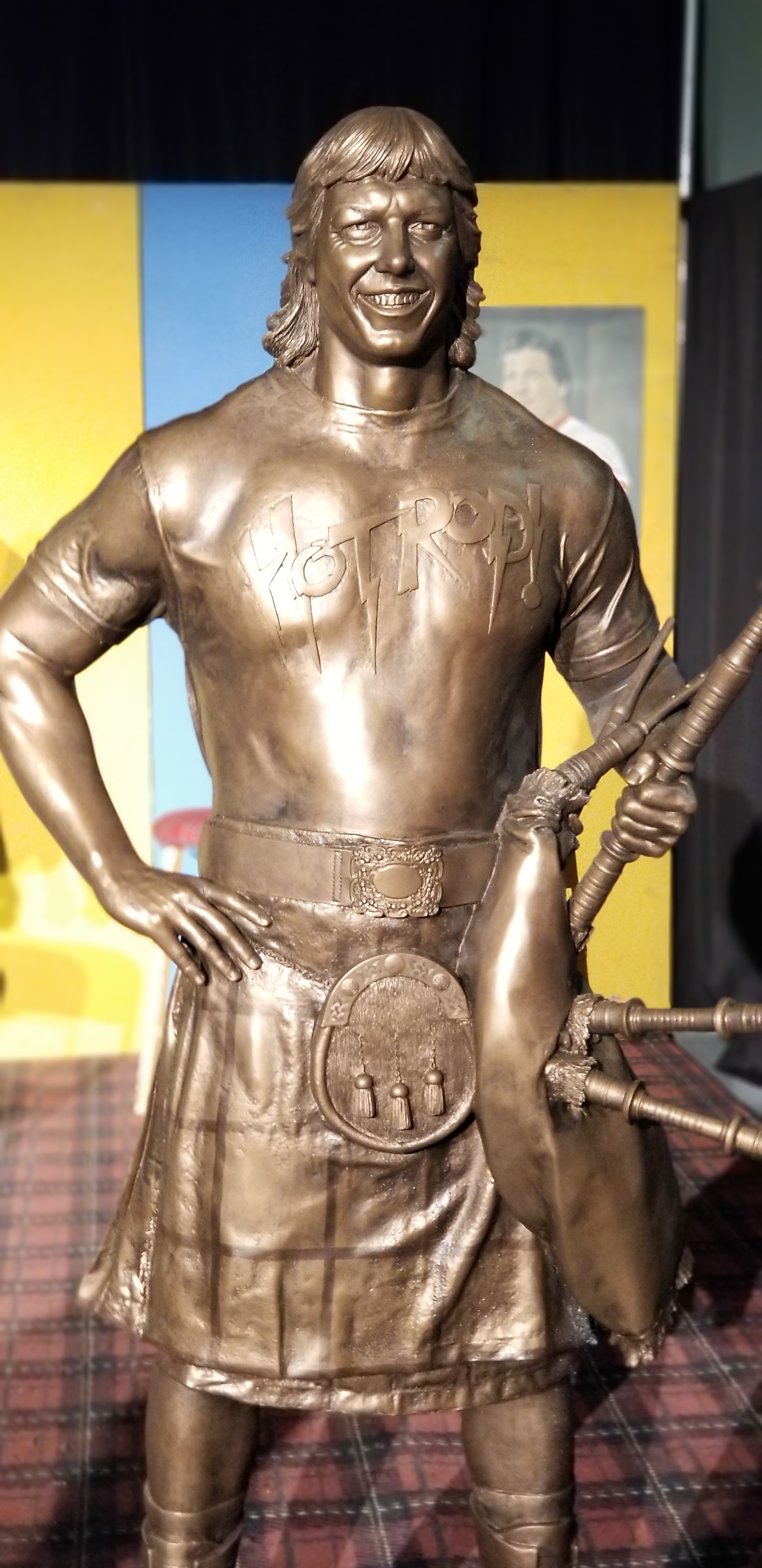
Piper was posthumously awarded a bronze statue in his likeness by WWE in April 2019 for his contributions to wrestling

Piper is considered one of the greatest talkers and heels in wrestling history. Piper's Pit interview segments were considered innovative, especially in an atmosphere where only the people like the world champion got to talk, and the wrestlers were the interviewees—never the interviewers. According to Bobby "The Brain" Heenan, he could just leave Piper in a room and return twenty minutes later with Piper having done a class-A promo. WWE named him the greatest villain in wrestling history.

Dave Meltzer of the Wrestling Observer Newsletter described Piper as "one of the key figures in the growth of WWF. In particular, he helped power the success of the first WrestleMania: the most important show in company history".

Piper was one of the first wrestlers to have his entrance music played by a live band. At the War to Settle the Score in February 1985 before his WWF Title match with Hulk Hogan at Madison Square Garden, Piper's theme was played by the NYPD Pipes and Drums out to the ring.

Mixed martial artist Ronda Rousey was nicknamed "Rowdy" by her friends. She initially rejected using it professionally, feeling it might disrespect Piper. After being introduced to him through Gene LeBell, Piper gave her his approval to use the nickname. On the day of his death, she dedicated her next day's UFC 190 title match with Bethe Correia to him. After quickly winning it, she noted him first in her post-fight interview. In 2018, when Rousey made her full-time WWE debut, she wore the jacket that Piper wore, which was given to her by his son. She also used a move called Piper's Pit, a reference to the talkshow he held during the WWF.

In April 2019, Piper was honored with a statue as part of WrestleMania Axxess in Brooklyn, New York.

== Filmography ==
=== Film ===
Year	Title	Role	Notes	Ref.
1978	The One and Only	Joe 'Leatherneck Joe' Grady	Uncredited	
1986	Body Slam	Rick 'Quick Rick' Roberts	Supporting role	
1988	Hell Comes to Frogtown	Sam Hell	Lead role	
1988	They Live	John Nada	Lead role	
1989	Buy & Cell	Cowboy	Supporting role	
1991	Tagteam	Rick McDonald	Lead role	
1994	Back in Action	Frank Rossi	Lead role	
1994	Immortal Combat	John Keller	Lead Role	
1995	No Contest	'Ice'	Supporting role	
1995	Tough & Deadly	Elmo Freech	Lead role	
1995	Jungleground	Lt. Jacob Cornell	Lead role	
1996	Terminal Rush	Bartel	Lead role	
1996	Marked Man	Frank Gibson	Lead role	
1996	Sci-Fighters	Detective Cameron Grayson	Lead role	
1997	First Encounter	Lieutenant Ed Ganz	Lead role	
1997	Dead Tides	Mick Leddy	Lead role	
1997	The Bad Pack	Dash Simms	Lead role	
1998	Hard Time	Randy	Supporting role	
1998	Last to Surrender	Nick Ford	Lead role	
1999	Legless Larry & the Lipstick Lady	Larry 'Legless Larry'	Lead role	
1999	The Shepherd	Miles	Also known as Cyber City	
2000	Jack of Hearts	Detective Deeks	Supporting role	
2005	Three Wise Guys	Pastor Roberts	Supporting role	
2005	Honor	LT Tyrell	3rd lead	
2006	Domestic Import	Bill 'Bronco Bill'	Also known as Nanny Insanity	
2006	Costa Chica: Confession of an Exorcist	Lucas McMurter	Also known as Legion: The Final Exorcism	
2006	Shut Up and Shoot!	Yokum the Bartender	Supporting role	
2006	Night Traveler	The Pyro Messiah	Voice, supporting role	
2006	Blind Eye	Fred Mears	Lead role	
2007	Ghosts of Goldfield	Jackson Smith		
2007	Super Sweet 16: The Movie	Mitch		
2008	Legion: The Final Exorcism	Unknown		
2009	The Mystical Adventures of Billy Owens	William Thurgood	Lead role	
2009	A Gothic Tale	Narrator		
2010	The Portal	George 'Homeless George'		
2010	Lights Out	Detective Callahan	Lead role	
2010	Billy Owens and the Secret of the Runes	William Thurgood		
2010	Alien Opponent	Father Melluzzo	Lead role	
2011	Clear Lake	Wayne	Lead role	
2011	Pizza Man	Roderick		
2011	Fancypants	Smiley	Lead role	
2011	Green Lantern: Emerald Knights	Bolphunga	Voice, direct-to-video	
2013	Black Dynamite Teaches a Hard Way!	Himself	Guest role	
2013	Pro Wrestlers vs Zombies	Himself	Lead role	
2014	Don't Look Back	Grandfather	Eddie Starks	
2015	The Reconciler	Russ		
2015	Portal to Hell	Jack	Lead role	
2015	The Masked Saint	Nicky Stone		
2016	The Bet	Mr. Jablonski	Posthumous release	
2016	The Chair	Murphy	Posthumous release	
2016	The Green Fairy	Oscar Wilde	Posthumous release	

=== Television ===
Year	Title	Role	Notes	Ref.
1987	The Highwayman	Preacher	Episode: "Pilot"	
1989	The Super Mario Bros. Super Show!	Himself	Guest appearance	
1990	The Love Boat: A Valentine Voyage	Maurice Steiger	Television film	
1992	Silk Stalkings	Jimmy Snow	Episode: "Wild Card"	
1993	Highlander	Anthony Gallen, Immortal	Episode: "Epitaph for Tommy"	
1994	RoboCop	Tex Jones/Faked Commander Cash	Episode: "Robocop vs. Commander Cash"	
1996	Joe Bob's MonsterVision Summer School	Himself	Episode: "They Live/Immortal Combat"	MonsterVision
1998	Walker, Texas Ranger	Cody 'The Crusader' Conway	Episode: "Crusader"	
1999	The Outer Limits	Marlon	Episode: "Small Friends"	
1999	Louis Theroux's Weird Weekends	Himself	Episode: "Wrestling"	
1999	Mentors	Daniel Boone	Episode: "The Rescue"	
2003	The Man Show	Himself	Episode: Apologizing	
2006	Robot Chicken	Himself	Voice, episode: "Metal Militia"	
2009–2013	It's Always Sunny in Philadelphia	Da' Maniac	2 episodes	
2010	Cold Case	"Sweet" Sil Tavern	Episode: "One Fall"	
2011	Rob Dyrdek's Fantasy Factory	Himself	Episode: "Kid Lightning"	
2012	Breaking In	Mr. Weller	Episode: "The Contra Club"	
2013	Storage Wars	Himself	Episode: "Barry's Angels"	
2013	Celebrity Wife Swap	Himself	1 episode	
2014	Adventure Time	Don John	Voice; episode: "The Red Throne"	
2014	WWE Legends' House	Himself	10 episodes - Season 1	
2015	Food Factory USA	Himself	Episode: "No Snout About It"	

=== Online streaming ===
Year	Title	Role	Notes
2014–2015	Piper's Pit	Himself	Podcast, with PodcastOne from April 2014 to July 2015, two last episodes on SoundCloud
2015	Table for 3	Himself	Three WWE personalities share stories over dinner.; Last appearance in WWE.; Aired posthumously on August 6, 2015.

=== Video games ===
Year	Title	Role
2013	Saints Row IV	Himself

== Championships and accomplishments ==
- Big Time Wrestling (San Francisco)
  - NWA United States Heavyweight Championship (San Francisco version) (1 time)
  - NWA World Tag Team Championship (San Francisco version) (1 time) – with Ed Wiskoski
- Canadian Pro-Wrestling Hall of Fame
  - Class of 2022
- Cauliflower Alley Club
  - Reel Member Inductee (2001)
- George Tragos/Lou Thesz Professional Wrestling Hall of Fame
  - Class of 2008
- International Professional Wrestling Hall of Fame
  - Class of 2026
- Mid-Atlantic Championship Wrestling/World Championship Wrestling
  - NWA Mid-Atlantic Heavyweight Championship (2 times)
  - NWA Television Championship (2 times)
  - NWA/WCW United States Heavyweight Championship (3 times)
- NWA All-Star Wrestling
  - NWA Canadian Tag Team Championship (Vancouver version) (1 time) – with Rick Martel
- NWA Hollywood Wrestling
  - NWA Americas Heavyweight Championship (5 times)
  - NWA Americas Tag Team Championship (5 times) – with Crusher Verdu (1), Keith Franks (1), Pak Choo (1), Ron Bass (1), and The Hangman (1)
  - NWA World Light Heavyweight Championship (1 time) (Note: The NWA World Light Heavyweight Championship is no longer recognized or sanctioned by the National Wrestling Alliance.)
- Pacific Northwest Wrestling
  - NWA Pacific Northwest Heavyweight Championship (2 times)
  - NWA Pacific Northwest Tag Team Championship (5 times) – with Killer Tim Brooks (1), Rick Martel (3), and Mike Popovich (1) (Note: Martel vacated the title after losing a loser-leaves-town match, and Piper chose Popovich as a replacement partner.)
- Pro Wrestling Guerrilla
  - Legends Battle Royal (2011)
- Pro Wrestling Illustrated
  - Inspirational Wrestler of the Year (1982)
  - Match of the Year (1985) with Paul Orndorff vs. Hulk Hogan and Mr. T at WrestleMania I
  - Most Hated Wrestler of the Year (1984, 1985)
  - Most Popular Wrestler of the Year (1986)
  - Stanley Weston Award (2015)
  - Ranked No. 45 of the top 500 singles wrestlers in the PWI 500 in 1992
  - Ranked No. 17 of the 500 singles wrestlers during the "PWI Years" in 2003
- Professional Wrestling Hall of Fame and Museum
  - Class of 2007
- Sports Illustrated
  - Ranked No. 13 of the 20 Greatest WWE Wrestlers Of All Time
- World Class Championship Wrestling
  - NWA American Tag Team Championship (1 time) – with Bulldog Brower
- World Wrestling Federation/World Wrestling Entertainment/WWE
  - WWF Intercontinental Championship (1 time)
  - World Tag Team Championship (1 time) – with Ric Flair
  - WWE Hall of Fame (Class of 2005)
  - WWE Bronze Statue (2019)
  - Slammy Award (1 time)
    - Best Personality in "Land of a Thousand Dances" (1986)
- Wrestling Observer Newsletter
  - Best Heel (1984, 1985)
  - Best on Interviews (1981–1983) (Note: 1981 award shared with Lou Albano.)
  - Worst Worked Match of the Year (1986) vs. Mr. T in a boxing match at WrestleMania 2
  - Worst Worked Match of the Year (1997) vs. Hollywood Hogan at SuperBrawl VII
  - Wrestling Observer Newsletter Hall of Fame (Class of 1996)

== Luchas de Apuestas record ==
Winner (wager)	Loser (wager)	Location	Event	Date	Notes
Roddy Piper (hair)	Luke Williams (hair)	Portland, Oregon	Live Event	March 1, 1980	
Roddy Piper (hair)	Adrian Adonis (hair)	Pontiac, Michigan	WrestleMania III	March 29, 1987	
