= The Masked Saint =

2015 American biographical drama film

- Theatrical release poster
- Directed by: Warren P. Sonoda
- Screenplay by: Scott Crowell
- Based on: The Masked Saint by Chris Whaley
- Produced by: Cliff McDowell
- Starring: Brett Granstaff; Lara Jean Chorostecki; Diahann Carroll; Patrick McKenna; Roddy Piper
- Cinematography: James Griffith
- Edited by: Aden Bahadori
- Music by: Roger St-Denis
- Production companies: P23 Entertainment; Ridgerock Entertainment Group
- Distributed by: Freestyle Releasing
- Release dates: April 2015 (International Christian Film Fest); January 8, 2016
- Running time: 105 minutes
- Country: Canada
- Language: English
- Budget: $3.5 million
- Box office: $182,695

The Masked Saint is a 2015 Canadian biographical drama film directed by Warren P. Sonoda. It is based on the 2009 book of the same name by Chris Whaley. The film stars Brett Granstaff, Lara Jean Chorostecki, T.J. McGibbon, Diahann Carroll (in her final film role before her death in October 2019), Roddy Piper (in his final film role before his death in July 2015), and James Preston Rogers. It was produced by Cliff McDowell and released in select theaters on January 8, 2016.

== Plot ==
Chris Samuels is a former professional wrestler who retires from the ring to settle down as a small town pastor. When the pastor witnesses rampant problems in the community, he decides to moonlight as a masked vigilante fighting the injustice. While facing crises at home and at the church, the pastor must evade the police and somehow reconcile his secret, violent identity with his calling as a pastor.

== Cast ==
- Brett Granstaff as Chris Samuels
- Lara Jean Chorostecki as Michelle
- T.J. McGibbon as Carrie Samuels
- Diahann Carroll as Ms. Edna
- Roddy Piper as Nicky Stone
- James Preston Rogers as The Reaper
- Mykel Shannon Jenkins as Detective Harper
- Patrick McKenna as Judd Lumpkin
- Scott Nichol as Tim McDonald
- Joan Gregson as Mrs. Beasley

== Reception ==
The Masked Saint received negative reviews from critics. On Rotten Tomatoes, the film holds a rating of 14%, based on 7 reviews, with an average rating of 4.1/10. On Metacritic, the film has a score of 22 out of 100, based on 5 critics, indicating "generally unfavorable reviews".
