= The It Factor =

American reality television series

- Genre: Reality
- Country of origin: United States
- Original language: English
- No. of seasons: 2

Production
- Running time: 30 minutes

Original release
- Network: Bravo
- Release: January 6, 2002 – March 31, 2003

The It Factor is an American reality television series that aired for two seasons on the American TV channel Bravo. It followed actors as they attempted to lead successful careers.

The first season profiled actors in New York City, and the second season did the same in Los Angeles. Notable actors who appeared on the show include Oscar nominee Jeremy Renner, Tony award winner Daisy Eagan, model/actress LisaRaye, Michaela Conlin (who went on to become a regular on the TV series Bones), Katheryn Winnick, and Godfrey (who became a spokesman for 7 Up).
