= Godfrey (comedian) =

American comedian (born 1969)

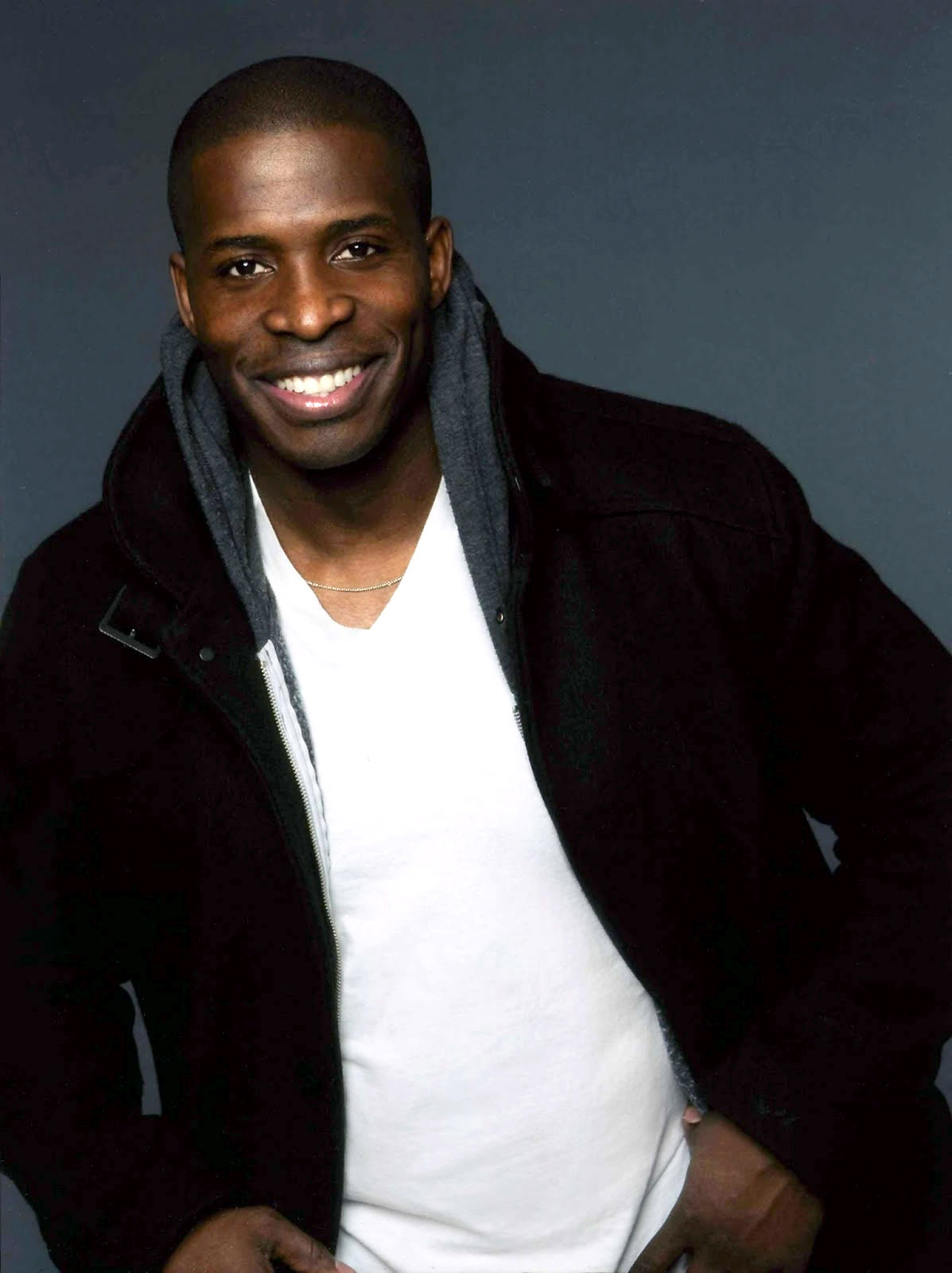
- Undated photo of Godfrey
- Born: Godfrey C. Ndubuisi. Danchimah Jr. July 21, 1969 (age 57); Lincoln, Nebraska, U.S.
- Occupations: Comedian; actor; podcaster
- Years active: 1995–present
- Website: godfreylive.com

Godfrey Chukwuma Ndubuisi Danchimah Jr. (born July 21, 1969), known mononymously as Godfrey, is an American comedian and actor who has appeared on BET, VH1, Comedy Central, and feature films, such as Soul Plane, Original Gangstas, Zoolander, and Johnson Family Vacation. He was also a spokesperson for 7 Up during their "7up yours" advertising campaign, and a cast member on the first season of The It Factor, a reality television series.

He is also known for performing the voices of Mr. Stubborn and Mr. Tall (season 2) in The Mr. Men Show, and hosting the FOX game show Bullseye. Danchimah also hosted his own radio show on SiriusXM until he parted ways with the show in July 2019. He has hosted the podcast In Godfrey We Trust on the Gas Digital Network since 2018.

== Biography ==
Godfrey Danchimah Jr. was born to Nigerian parents of Igbo descent. They immigrated to the US to escape the Nigerian Civil War. Godfrey is a nephew of Nigerian musician Sonny Okosun.

Godfrey was born in Lincoln, Nebraska, on July 21, 1969. Soon after, the family settled in Chicago where Godfrey grew up. He attended Lane Technical College Preparatory High School and received an academic scholarship to the University of Illinois at Urbana–Champaign, where he majored in psychology.

At the University of Illinois, he made the varsity football team and performed at a traditional talent show for new team members.

== Career ==
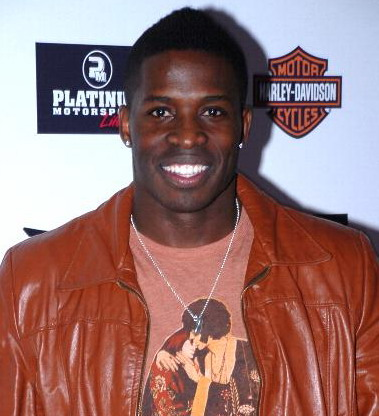
Godfrey in November 2007.

Godfrey honed his stand-up skills at the All Jokes Aside comedy club in Chicago in the early 1990s. In 1995, Godfrey made his New York debut at Carolines on Broadway and the Comic Strip Live and was soon signed by the William Morris Talent Agency. He began working regularly in television, first behind the cameras as a warm-up comedian for Cosby and Soul Man. His first on-camera appearance featured him performing stand-up comedy for NBC's Friday Night Videos, followed by more small television and film roles. In 2000, Godfrey appeared in the Aspen Comedy Festival and on Comedy Central's Premium Blend. He also played a comical role in the movie Soul Plane, acting as an African pilot. He has also been in numerous episodes of BET's Comic View.

A self-styled karate master, he continues to do film and television work alongside his stand-up career in New York. His first one-hour special, "Godfrey: Black by Accident" was shot for Comedy Central on January 22, 2011, at the Gramercy Theatre in New York City to a standing room only audience.

As a guest of Mike Ward's show called "F*ck les variétés", part of the Just for Laughs 2012 festival of Montreal, his performance was highly acclaimed. In the following year, he had his own solo show called "The Godfrey Complex" in the same festival for a whole week.

His second one-hour special, "Godfrey: Regular Black" was filmed for Showtime in Chicago, his home town, on August 12, 2016.

== Filmography and discography ==
=== Stand-up comedy releases ===
Solo albums and TV specials
Title	Release date	Debut medium
Premium Blend: Godfrey	2000	Television (Comedy Central)
Comedy Central Presents: Godfrey	February 18, 2005	Television (Comedy Central)
Godspeed	March 25, 2008	Audio CD
Black by Accident	August 27, 2011	Television (Comedy Central)
Regular Black	August 12, 2016	Television (Showtime)
Rebel With a Cause	January 14, 2026	Theatrical film

Collaborative albums and TV specials
Title	Release date	Debut medium
Just For Laughs: The Archives – Volume 23	October 15, 2018	Audio streaming
Just For Laughs: Premium – Volume 11	November 23, 2018	Audio streaming
Just For Laughs: Select – Volume 8	January 19, 2019	Audio streaming
Comedy In Color: Volume 1	December 10, 2021	Audio streaming

=== Film ===
Year	Title	Role	Notes
1996	Original Gangstas	Marcus	
1996	Joe's Apartment	Cockroach (voice)	
1996	Chain Reaction	Chidi Egbuna	
2000	In the Weeds	Stan	
2001	30 Years to Life	Comedian	
2001	Zoolander	Janitor Derek	
2004	Johnson Family Vacation	Motorcycle Cop	
2004	Soul Plane	First Officer Leslie Gaemon	
2004	The Cookout	Jasper	
2005	Virginia	Griffin	
2005	Short Fuse	Dogan	
2006	Phat Girlz	Akibo	
2007	A Dennis the Menace Christmas	Santa/Bob The Angel	Video
2007	Careless	Sabio	
2008	Stand Up	Dante	
2008	Show Stoppers	Final Judge	
2008	Bum Boot Camp	Bum	Short
2008	Don't Shoot the Pharmacist!	Kevin	
2008	The Sweep	Jerome	
2008	Unemployed	Jamal	
2009	Omar Saved from Cheating	Omar	Short
2010	Sexcut	TV Actor	Short
2010	A Man, a Woman, a Genie, a Gun	Genie	Short
2016	Like Lambs	Officer Michaels	
2016	The Hudson Tribes	Mayor Joubert Lafitte	
2019	Rapid Eye Movement	Marcus Crawford	
2020	The Binge	Hags' Father	
2020	The Truth About Santa Claus	Herbie	
2021	Americanish	Gabriel Jackson	
2023	The Perfect Find	Jimmy	
2023	Unbraided	Narrator (voice)	Short
2024	Athazagora	Stan the Driver	Short

=== Television ===
Year	Title	Role	Notes
1995	Midnight Mac	HBO Executive	Episode: "Episode #1.1"
1999	LateLine	Mfune Umbwebwe	Episode: "The Minister of Television"
2000	Thunderbox	Himself/Host	Main Host
2000	Rock of Ages	Himself/Host	Main Host
2001	30 by 30: Kid Flicks	Himself/Host	Main Host
2002	The It Factor	Himself	Main Cast
2002	I Bet You Will	Himself/Host	Main Host
2002	Late Friday	Himself	Episode: "Episode #2.6"
2002	It's Showtime at the Apollo	Himself	Episode: "Queen Latifah/Godfrey"
2002	Third Watch	Ricky	Episode: "Blackout"
2003	The Celebrity Look-Alike Show	Himself/Host	Main Host
2003	I Love the '80s Strikes Back	Himself	Recurring Guest
2004	I Love the '90s	Himself	Recurring Guest
2004	Retrosexual: The 80's	Himself	TV series
2005	I Love the '90s: Part Deux	Himself	TV series
2005	Black in the 80s	Himself	Recurring Guest
2005	Comedy Central Presents	Himself	Episode: "Godfrey"
2005	I Love the '80s 3-D	Himself	Episode: "1985"
2005	I Love the Holidays	Himself	TV series
2006	BET's Top 25 Countdown	Himself	Episode: "Moments in Black History"
2006	I Love Toys	Himself	TV series
2006	I Love the '70s: Volume 2	Himself	Recurring Guest
2006	Celebrity Paranormal Project	Himself	Episode: "Pearl's Story"
2006	100 Greatest Songs of the '80s	Himself	Main Guest
2006–14	Comics Unleashed	Himself	Recurring Guest
2007	What I Learned About... From the Movies	Himself	Episode: "Sports"
2008	I Love the New Millennium	Himself	Recurring Guest
2008	NESN Comedy All-Stars	Himself	Episode: "Episode #1.4"
2008	truTV Presents: World's Dumbest...	Himself	Recurring Cast: Season 1, Guest: Season 2
2008–09	The Mr. Men Show	Mr. Stubborn & Mr. Tall (voice)	Main Cast
2009	30 Rock	Rick	Episode: "The Bubble"
2009	Z Rock	Pure Dark	Episode: "Z Will Rock You"
2009	Black to the Future	Himself	Episode: "Hour 4: The 00s"
2009–11	Comedy.TV	Himself	Episode: "Episode #1.7" & "#1.18"
2010	Undateable	Himself	Main Guest
2010–11	Louie	Himself	Guest Cast: Season 1–2
2010–11	Latino 101	Himself	Main Guest
2010–12	Laugh Factory	Himself	Recurring Guest
2011	Love Lust	Himself	Episode: "Love Lust & Secret Societies"
2011	The Heart, She Holler	N-Word The Robot	Episode: "Fear Is Dog Spelled Bassackwards"
2012	20/20	Himself	Episode: "Best in TV: The Greatest TV Shows of Our Time"
2012	Just for Laughs: All-Access	Himself	Episode: "Episode #1.6"
2012–18	The Ha!ifax Comedy Fest	Himself	Recurring Guest
2013	Juste pour rire	Himself	Episode: "Gala Fuck les Variétés"
2013	PITtv	Himself	Episode: "Godfrey: Shout-Out!"
2013	Insane Clown Posse Theater	Himself	Episode: "Godfrey"
2013	Inside Joke at Moontower	Himself	Episode: "Episode #2.2" & "#2.26"
2013	Upload with Shaquille O'Neal	Himself/Co-Host	Main Co-Host
2014	Deadbeat	Shaky Hands	Recurring Cast: Season 1
2014	Law & Order: Special Victims Unit	Adam Church	Episode: "Reasonable Doubt"
2014	Black Dynamite	Al Sharpton (voice)	Episode: "Roots: The White Album"
2014–16	Steven Universe	Kofi Pizza (voice)	Recurring Cast
2015	The Nightly Show with Larry Wilmore	Himself/Panelist	Recurring Panelist: Season 1
2015	Bullseye	Himself/Co-Host	Main Co-Host
2015	ASSSSCAT 3000: New York	Himself	Episode: "Godfrey"
2015	World's Funniest	Himself/Panelist	Episode: "Cat's Entertainment"
2015	Get Your Life	Himself	Episode: "Girl Get Your NYPTSD"
2015	Benders	Rajon Tucker	Recurring Cast
2016	King Bachelor's Pad	Himself	Episode: "Angry Neighbor"
2016	Above Average Presents	Eric Simms	Episode: "The Kicker: For Fans. For Fun."
2017	What's Your F@#King Deal?!	Himself	Episode: "Brad Williams, Nick Vatterott and Godfrey"
2017	Neon Joe, Werewolf Hunter	Plaid Jeff	Main Cast: Season 2
2017–18	StarTalk	Himself/Co-Host	Episode: "Episode #4.12" & "#4.16"
2017–18	Lucha Underground	FBI Agent Winter	Recurring Cast: Season 3-4
2018	This Week at the Comedy Cellar	Himself	Recurring Guest
2018	Glimpse	Christian White	Episode: "Esperanto"
2018	Our Cartoon President	Barack Obama/Cory Booker (voice)	Recurring Cast: Season 1
2019	CBC Winnipeg Comedy Festival	Himself	Episode: "Just My Luck"
2019	King Bachelor's Pad	Himself	Episode: "Joker Parody"
2020	Tournament of Laughs	Himself	Episode: "And A Round of 32 We Go, Part 2"
2021	Tiffany Haddish Presents: They Ready	Himself	Episode: "Godfrey"
2021	Harlem	Cole Thompson	Episode: "Saturn Returns"
2021–22	Wild 'n Out	Himself/Cast Member	Main Cast: Season 16–18
2021–22	That Damn Michael Che	Calvin	Recurring Cast: Season 1, Guest: Season 2
2021–22	South Side	Delonte	Recurring Cast: Season 2, Guest: Season 3
2022	We Need to Talk About Cosby	Himself	Episode: "Part 1–4"
2022	So Dumb It's Criminal: Hosted by Snoop Dogg	Himself	Episode: "Hit and Run, Just for Fun"
2022	Dark Side of Comedy	Himself	Episode: "Richard Pryor"
2022	Human Resources	Mr. Beef (voice)	Recurring Cast: Season 1
2023	I'm a Virgo	A.I. Voice (voice)	Recurring Cast
2023	My Dad the Bounty Hunter	Ja Boluu (voice)	Episode: "This is Doloraam"

=== Documentaries ===
Year	Title
2002	Comedian
2009	Dane Cook, 30 Premeditated Acts
2010	I Am Comic
2011	Stars & Music
2012	40 Greatest Feuds 3
2012	The Science of Doctor Who
2023	Out of the Loop

== See also ==
- List of Igbo people
