= MTI Home Video =

United States-based movie distributor

- Type: DVD Distribution
- Founded: 1984
- Founder: Larry Brahms
- Headquarters: Miami, Florida, U.S.
- Owner: Privately held
- Website: mtivideo.com

MTI Home Video is a United States–based movie distributor in the direct-to-video market. MTI most often purchases the distribution rights to independent films and televised films that did not see a theatrical run in the U.S., for direct release to DVD.

== History ==
MTI Home Video was founded in 1984 by music industry veteran Larry Brahms. One of the company's first releases was Freedanse, an interactive fitness workout video featuring Marine Jahan from the film Flashdance.

The company was one of the first studios to successfully transfer from VHS to DVD format in 1999 by waiting until the major studios had decided upon standards before changing their business model.

MTI pioneered the sales of DVDs through alternative retailers such as dry cleaners, convenience stores and other non-traditional entertainment retail outlets in 2004.

== Films ==
The company releases an average of forty films each year and partners with studios such as the Asylum, Artist View Entertainment, Bedford Entertainment, Delta Entertainment, Fangoria Presents, and Redrum Entertainment. Although mostly known for releasing titles in the B-movie genre such as Sharknado and Stalked at 17; MTI has a line of family-oriented films and has released other independent films such as Bloom and Nate and the Colonel.

=== Partial filmography ===
- Albino Farm
- All Jokes Aside
- Americano
- Attack of the Herbals
- Billy Owens and the Secret of the Runes
- Black Cadillac
- The Black Ninja
- Bliss
- Bloom
- Choker
- Con Games
- Curse of the Queerwolf
- Dark Knight
- Death on Demand
- The Eliminator
- Flight 93
- Genius
- Goodbye America
- Hunting Humans
- I Downloaded a Ghost
- Ice Queen
- Illegal Aliens
- Kicking the Dog
- Malefactor
- Marching Out of Time
- Mystery Train
- The Mystical Adventures of Billy Owens
- Nate and the Colonel
- Never Too Late
- The Newcomers
- The Other Side of the Tracks
- Pirates
- A Place to Grow
- Remedy
- Safehouse
- Sharknado
- Slashers
- Stalked at 17
- Subhuman
- The Undying
- Walking the Halls
