= Bullseye (2015 American game show) =

2015 American television game show

- Genre: Game show
- Directed by: J. Rupert Thompson
- Presented by: Kellan Lutz; Godfrey
- Composer: Vanacore Music
- Country of origin: United States
- No. of seasons: 1
- No. of episodes: 8

Production
- Executive producers: Jon Kroll; Scott Larsen
- Producer: Pat Romano
- Editors: Eric Beetner, Conroy Browne, Tom Danon, Jason Dolder, Scott Morgan
- Running time: 60 minutes
- Production companies: Endemol; Lock and Key Productions

Original release
- Network: Fox
- Release: May 27 – July 15, 2015

Bullseye is an American game show on Fox hosted by action star Kellan Lutz and comedian Godfrey. The show features contestants who compete in extreme challenges in order to hit or come the closest to the bullseye. The first episode premiered on Wednesday, May 27, 2015, at 9:00 pm EDT. The first season concluded on July 15, 2015.

On August 21, 2016, Bullseye was cancelled by Fox after one season.

== Gameplay ==
In each episode, four women and four men compete in three "epic challenges" to hit, collect, or destroy bullseyes for a chance to win $50,000.

For the first challenge, placement is based on the contestants' distance from a bullseye, and the competition is separated by gender, with two men and two women being eliminated. The second is a challenge to claim as many targets as possible, and only the contestant in last place is eliminated. The final three competitors then race each other in a large course, and the person with the fastest time (or slowest depending on the challenge) after any applicable penalties (for example, for missing a target) wins that episode's money.

== Episodes ==
No.	Title	Original release date	Viewers (millions)
1	"Bullseye Buggy Jump"	May 27, 2015	3.32
Competitors: Women: Jhaza - Restaurant Host, Los Angeles, CA; Jena - Personal Trainer, Rockport, TX; Kristina - Health Teacher, Glendale, CA; Ashley - Hip Hop Instructor, Lynchburg, VA. Men: Matt - Full-Time Student, Marila, NY; Chris - Fashion Designer, Austin, TX; Deesil - Photographer Sao Paulo, Brazil; Rashad, Air Force Veteran, Tampa, FL.: First Challenge: "Bullseye Bomb": Competitors dangle 100 feet in the air from a swaying helicopter flying over a runway with a large target on the ground where they have two chances to pick the perfect moment to release their "bullseye bomb" and either hit the bullseye or come as close to the target as possible.; Eliminated: Jena (off the runway) and Ashley (44 feet). Matt (19 feet 8 inches) and Deesil (17 feet 11 inches) Women's Winner: Kristina with 39 feet from bullseye. Jhaza moves on with 41 feet 4 inches. Men's Winner: Rashad with 13 feet from center of bullseye. Chris moves on with 16 feet 10 inches: Second Challenge: "Bobbing for Bullseyes": Competitors are suspended upside-down 50 feet in the air above a massive tank of water which have bullseyes tethered to the bottom. Each competitor are plunged into the tank from a bungee cord 7 times and must try to release as many targets as possible.; Eliminated: Jhaza (10 bullseyes) Women's Winner: Kristina (12 bullseyes) Men's Winner: Rashad (16 bullseyes). Chris moves on with 11 bullseyes.: Final Challenge: "Bullseye Buggy Jump": Competitors race in an ATV buggy going around a dirt course hitting the 5 bullseyes placed on the ground on their way to an epic jump where they must blast through 3 moving bullseyes suspended in air. If they miss a target, they must go around the course again.; Eliminated: Chris missed 1 bullseye (0:64.2) and Kristina missed 1 bullseye (0:64.2). Winner: Rashad with a time of 0:56.2.: Overall Winner: Rashad
2	"Runaway Train"	June 3, 2015	3.32
Competitors: Men: Evan - Massage Therapist, Carlisle, PA; Skyler - Nanny, Santa Barbara, CA; John - Free Climber, Chicago, IL; Zack - Software Engineer, Studio City, CA. Women: Nakita - Telemarketer, Australia; Nivin - Mortgage Banker, Los Angeles, CA; Lindsey - Special Education Teacher, Redondo Beach, CA; Michelle - MMA Fighter/Single Mom, Fremont, LA.: First Challenge: This challenge involves a semi-truck and a platform. Each competitor, one by one, will be on the platform while the truck speeds down the pier. The competitor's task is to jump off the platform they are standing on, onto the bullseye. Their measurements from the center of the bullseye will be measured from where their back-side landed on the bullseye. Some competitors landed on the white of the bullseye, some landed on the black and blue (9ft-5ft).; Second Challenge: Competitors go head-to-head when they are harnessed onto a rope that pulls them up into the sky with loads of mini bullseye targets. Each competitor has to collect as many bullseyes as they can to beat their other opponent. They have to collect as many bullseyes before gravity pulls them back down to the ground.; Final Challenge: "Runaway Train": The competitors start at the back of a speeding train. When the horn goes off, they must race across the top of the train cars, and gather the bullseyes on the sides of the train. While the train rushes down the track. Finally, when they get to the end of the train, they have to jump in front of the moving train, trying to grab and pull the bonus bullseye, which divides their time by 7/6, or 1 1/6 to subtract seconds off their time. If they get the bullseye or not, they will hit the bullseye behind them, and that will stop the train, and the clock.; Winner: Skyler, with a time of 58 with bonus Bullseye.: Overall Winner: Skyler
3	"Bullseye Bumper Cars"	June 10, 2015	3.16
Competitors: Women: Rachel - Pepper Spray Maker, Findlay, OH; Erin - Teacher, Santa Maria, CA; Roxan - Event Planner, Paso Robles, CA; Tasha - Olympic Athlete, London, England Men: Dan - Musician, Visalia, CA; Jack - Waiter, New York, NY; Azmyth - Dee Jay, Snohomish, WA; Marquest - Cell Phone Sales, Toledo, OH: First Challenge: "Human Slingshot": Competitors are catapulted through the air on a giant slingshot over a 300 foot cliff. Holding a bullseye bomb as they whip back and forth above the cliff, they'll heave the bombs as close to the target bullsyeye as possible on the canyon floor below. if the competitors don't like their first attempt, they can try again. But if they decide to take a second shot, their first throw is void and will use the mark from the second attempt no matter where it lands.; Eliminated: Roxan (14 feet), Rachel (24 ft 2 in); Azmyth (33 feet), Dan (11 ft 10 in) Women's Winner: Tasha (5 ft 9 in). Erin moves on with 7 ft 9 in. Men's Winner: Jack hit the bullseye with 4 feet, Marquest moves on with 7 ft 8 in: Second Challenge: "Bullseye Baseball": Competitors ride on a semi-truck that speeds down a bumpy dirt road as it whips from side to side. Their job is to hit as many targets with a baseball bat while staying on their feet on top of the moving truck. If any time, they hit a target and they're not on their feet, it doesn't count.; Eliminated: Jack (11 bullseyes) Men's Winner: Marquest (13 bullseyes) Women's Winner: Erin (14 bullseyes), Tasha moves on with 13 bullseyes.: Final Challenge: "Bullseye Bumper Car": Competitors are driving a "bullseye bumper car" (dune buggy) when two semi-trucks get up to speed. A horn will sound and they have to catch up to the trucks and smash into the bullseye targets on the back of the trucks three times each. But they will have to crash through barriers, glass and debris as they move between the trucks. They must hit all six bullsyes or they get a 20 second penalty for each one they miss. As they rear-end each truck three times, they can speed ahead and smash through the one final bullseye to stop the clock. The fastest competitor will win $50,000.; Eliminated: Marquest with 5 hits and a time of 56.2, Tasha with 6 hits, but rolled car. Winner: Erin with 6 hits and a time of 44 seconds.: Overall Winner: Erin
4	"Jet Ski Jamboree"	June 17, 2015	2.78
Competitors: Men: Dustin - Chef, East Liverpool, OH; Evan - Ballet Dancer, Huntington Beach, CA; Paul - Semi-Pro Bowler, Camarillo, CA; Sedale - Masters Student, Boston, MA Women: Alyssa - Jewelry Artist, Omaha, NE; Nia - Food Inspector, Lima, Peru; Andrea - Hair Stylist, Shafter, CA; Sheri - Accountant, Green Valley, CA: First Challenge: "Bullseye Drag": Competitors will lie down holding onto a 15 foot steel bar that's attached to a helicopter flying above. The helicopter will race off dragging the competitors down a 500 foot track towards a large bullseye on the ground all while being distracted by 3,000-degree fireballs. All the way, they must move from one end of the bar to the other to line up with the target and release at just the right moment so they slide like a hockey puck. The two men and two women who get the closest to the bullseye move on to the next round.; Eliminated: Dustin (21 ft 3 in), Evan (24 ft 4 in), Nia (20 ft 5 in), Alyssa (13 ft 11 in) Women's Winner: Sheri (3 ft 4 in); Andrea moves on with 8 ft 1 in. Men's Winner: Sedale (1 ft 5 in); Paul moved on with 6 ft 2 in.: Second Challenge: "Bullseye Balls": Competitors will go head-to-head in a giant zorbing ball, trying to hit bulleye targets while rolling uncontrollably down a quarter-mile (1,320 feet) 35-degree grass hill course. The person who knocks down the most bullseyes will move on to the final challenge. The two winners go on to the next round while the two losers have a face-off for the final spot in the final challenge. First Round: Paul (0 bullseyes) vs. Sedale (5 bullseyes); Andrea (2 bullseyes) vs. Sheri (4 bullseyes). Final Round: Andrea (0 bullseyes) vs. Paul (7 bullseyes); Eliminated: Andrea failed to hit any bullseyes in final race. Women's Winner: Sheri wins her race with 4 bullseyes. Men's Winner: Sedale, Paul moves on with 7 bullseyes and winner of final race.: Final Challenge: "Bullseye Jet Ski": A speedboat pulls the competitors across a lake. Each competitor will shimmy across a 20-foot long pole as fast as they can to get to the jet ski waiting on the other side. The longer they take to get to the jet ski, the farther they will be from the finish line at the bullseye ramp when they jump on board. They must zigzag at a top speed of 60 MPH through the floating buoys towards the ramp and jump the bulleye to stop the clock and potentially win $50,000.; Eliminated: Sheri (286.0), Sedale (245.0) Winner: Paul (117.0): Overall Winner: Paul
5	"Defying Gravity"	June 24, 2015	2.66
Competitors: Rachelle - Administrative Assistant, San Carlos, CA; Krista - Gymnastics Coach, Philadelphia, PA; Jennifer - Dental Assistant, Laguna Niguel, CA; Brooklyn - Office Manager, Apple Valley, CA Men: Eugene - Stock Broker Yorba Linda, CA; Lucas - Real Estate Investor San Francisco, CA; Santwon - Cheer Choreographer, Louisville, KY; Tim - Surgical Sales, Detroit, MI: First Challenge: "Bullseye Drifting": Competitors must hang on to a bullseye disc attached to a drift car. When the car is spinning, they have to time their release and slide as close to the center of the giant bullseye as possible. The two women and two men that are the closest to the bullseye move on to the next round. And the rest of them slide away with nothing.; Eliminated: Rachelle (27 ft), Brooklyn (56 ft). Eugene (36 ft), Lucas (35 ft) Women's Winner: Krista (17 ft 4 in). Jennifer moves on with 20 ft 4 in. Men's Winner: Santwon (3 ft). Tim moves on with 31 ft.: Second Challenge: "Defy Gravity": Competitors will descend from the top of a skyscraper 35 stories (350 feet). On their way down, there are 46 bullseyes. They have to swing like a pendulum and tag as many bullseyes as they can with a hand or foot. The three competitors that tag the most bullseyes will move on to the final challenge.; Eliminated: Tim (3 bullseyes) Women's Winner: Krista (11 bullseyes), Jennifer moves on with 7 bullseyes). Men's Winner: Santwon (11 bullseyes): Final Challenge: "Copter Course": Competitors are harnessed to a hydraulic track hanging under a helicopter. They will use a remote control to shoot themselves from one side of the track to the other to line themselves up with the buoys along the slalom course in the water below. Their goal is to hit five of the mini bullseye targets perched on the top of the buoys. If they don't do that, they have to go back around the course until they do. Once they hit five targets, the helicopter will make a hard turn and take them directly to the final bullseye, where they will pull their quick release button and land on the large bullseye floating in the water. If they miss the bullseye, the clock won't stop until they swim to it. The fastest competitor to hit five targets and land on the floating bullseye will win $50,000.; Eliminated: Jennifer (178.1), Santwon (149.0) Winner: Krista (128.0): Overall Winner: Krista
6	"Corkscrewed"	July 1, 2015	2.76
Competitors: Women: Naomi - Casino Dealer, Tucson, AZ; Jasmine - Nanny, Anaheim, CA; Chrissy - Bike Tour Guide, Huntington Beach, CA; Aimee - Pastry Student, North Pole, AK Men: Bobby - Car Service Driver, Granada Hills, CA; Brent - Retired, Philadelphia, PA; Elliot - Former Cheerleader, Richmond, VA; Ricky - Realtor, Cerritos, CA: First Challenge: "Flip It to Win It": Competitors drive a car which has been modified to flip when they slam on the brakes at the right speed. The goal is to flip the car so the arrow on the front bumper ends up as close to the bullseye as possible. If they don't complete a full rotation, the mark still counts. But anyone who flips the car completely will advance over anyone who doesn't. If the wheels don't leave the ground at all, you are disqualified. The two men and the two women who get closed to the bullseye move on to the next round; Eliminated: Chrissy (didn't make a full rotation), Naomi (36 ft); Elliot (36 ft), Ricky (didn't hit the brakes hard enough, never rotated) Women's Winner: Jasmine (13 ft), Aimee moves on with a full rotation. Men's Winner: Bobby (18 ft 6 in), Brent moves on with 21 ft but didn't make a full rotation: Second Challenge: "Truck Drag": Competitors hang underneath a jackknifing and drifting semi truck which will spin around in a circle five times. As they are whirling around, they must grab as many bullseyes as they can from the underside of the truck and throw them at a large bullseye target on the ground. The three competitors who throw the most bullseyes on the target move on to the final challenge for a chance to win $50,000.; Eliminated: Brent (3 bullseyes, one in the black which is further from center) Women's Winner: Jasmine (5 bullseyes), Amiee moves on with 3 bullseyes, one in the blue which is closer to center) Men's Winner: Bobby (4 bullseyes): Final Challenge: "Corkscrew": Competitors are suspended in the air spun around at top speed, and then lowered onto a beam that is jutting out over a 400-foot cliff. Once on the beam, the dizzy competitors must keep their balance as they make their way back and forth along the beam to collect three targets and place each on a large bullseye at the other end. If they lose their balance or fall off, they have to climb across the cargo net below to the end of the beam and pull themselves back up, costing them valuable time. The fastest competitor to put the three targets on the bullseye wins the money.; Eliminated: Bobby (131.0), Amiee (128.1) Winner: Jasmine (82.0): Overall Winner: Jasmine
7	"Super Soakers"	July 8, 2015	2.73
Competitors: Women: Reagan - Hairstylist, Glendale, CA; Doris - Office Manager, Miami, FL; Davina - Waitress, Great Falls, VA; Katherine - Theme Park Security, Fillmore, CA Men: Steve - Bartender, East Windsor, NJ; Jay - Surfer, Ocean City, MD; James - Executive Assistant, Detroit, MI; Carlo - Systems Administrator, San Francisco, CA: First Challenge: "Bullseye Swing": Competitors will hang from a giant crane and will be dropped and swung over a giant bullseye on the ground below. They have to drop their bullseye bomb as close to the target as possible. At the top of the swing, they have a chance to grab a second bullseye bomb and come back down to drop it on the target. The two women and two men who are the closest to the bullseye move on to the next round.; Eliminated: Doris (35 ft), Davina (17 ft 1 in), Jay (30 ft 8 in), James (way off target) Women's Winner: Katherine (8 ft 10 in), Reagan moves on with 10 ft 2 in Men's Winner: Steve (6 ft 6 in), Carlo moves on with 13 ft 9 in: Second Challenge: "Crash Course": Competitors are towed around the course in a modified go-kart behind a busy soccer mom in a mini van as she races to do her errands. They have to steer the cart and hit as many bullseyes as possible while dodging soccer balls. The three competitors that hit the most bullseyes will move on to the final challenge.; Eliminated: Steve (9 bullseyes with 2 consecutive hits) Women's Winner: Reagan (9 bullseyes with 3 consecutive hits), Katherine moves on with 9 bullseyes and 4 consecutive hits) Men's Winner: Carlo (10 bullseyes): Final Challenge: "Super Soakers": Abroad the historic Lane Victory ship, competitors cling to the outside of a transparent ball (aka, "Spinning Ball of Doom"), hanging from a helicopter. They have to maneuver around the outside of the ball and remove all six targets from it while being blasted by a jet of water from the speedboat below. The water is going to cause the ball to spin out of control. Once they release the last target, the helicopter will turn around, and head to the final floating bullseye where they will jump off at exactly the right time to stop the clock. The competitor with the fastest time will win $50,000.; Eliminated: Reagan (112.2), Katherine (74.0) Winner: Carlo (66.0): Overall Winner: Carlo
8	"Zip Timeline"	July 15, 2015	2.59
Competitors: Women: Alyssa - Kids Party Entertainer, Johnstown, PA; Jessica - Competitive Gamer, Templeton, CA; Linnae - Sports Life Coach, Northridge, CA; Lisa - Hairstylist, Chicago, IL Men: Mandell - Drummer, Detroit, MI; Wes - English Teacher, Friendsville, TN; Roddy - Clothing Designer, Mililani, HI; Alex - Engineer, San Diego, California: First Challenge: "Cyclotron": Competitors are strapped to a giant rotating arm that spins. As they spin, they must grab one of the targets and throw it at the bullseye on the ground below. However, they can only throw one target for each rotation until they run out. The longer they're on the Cyclotron, the faster it will spin. Only the closet target to the center of the bullseye will be measured. For their toss to on target, they must have perfect timing, and at the same time, try to keep their heads on straight.; Eliminated: Lisa (target landed in the red ring), Alyssa (target landed in the red ring); Alex (target landed in the red ring), Women's Winner: Jessica (1 ft 2 in target landed in the gold center ring of the bullseye), Linnae moves on with 1 ft 9 in (target landed in the gold ring); Men's Winner: Wes (8 inches from center, landed in gold of bullseye), Roddy (9 inches from center of the bullseye), Mandell (10.5 inches from center, landed in gold); Second Challenge: "Semi Jump": Once the semi-trucks are up to speed, competitors have to jump back and forth as the convoy barrels down the runway. The gap between the trucks will widen the further they go. They must keep jumping until they come up short, face-planting on a semi. The three competitors that hot the most bullseyes move to the final challenge.; Eliminated: Linnae (11 jumps on the bullseyes); Women's Winner: Jessica (15 jumps on the bullseyes); Men's Winner: Roddy (19 jumps on the bullseye), Wes moves on with 17 jumps onto the bullseye.; Final Challenge: "Zip Timeline": Competitors must run in place on a giant wheel. The wheel will increase in speed while they collect as many bullseye bombs as possible and try to stay on the wheel the longest until they run out of steam and fall off the treadmill in the sky. Then they will zipline all the way over to the final bullseye on the other side. They have an opportunity to add time to their clock by dropping bullsyes on the three targets on the ground. Each target they hit will add another five seconds, but the clock won't stop until they smash through the final bullseye. The competitor with the slowest time will zip their way to $50,000.; Eliminated: Roddy (1 min 19 sec), Jessica (1 min 25 sec); Winner: Wes (1 min 26 sec); Overall Winner: Wes
