= The Mystical Adventures of Billy Owens =

- Directed by: Mark McNabb
- Written by: Charlie Fitzgerald; Virginia Carraway
- Produced by: Kelly Irwin; Mark McNabb
- Starring: Roddy Piper; Dalton Mugridge; Christopher Fazio
- Cinematography: Y. Robert Tymstra
- Edited by: Mark McNabb
- Music by: Iain Kelso
- Production companies: Artist View Entertainment, Skylight Films
- Distributed by: MTI Home Video
- Release date: December 15, 2008
- Running time: 87 minutes
- Country: Canada
- Language: English

The Mystical Adventures of Billy Owens is a 2008 Canadian mockbuster about a boy who discovers on his 11th birthday that he is capable of using magic and must save his town from destruction. This film was presented in two parts under a "To Be Continued" format, with a sequel, Billy Owens and the Secret of the Runes, which followed in 2010.

The film has been referred to as a knock-off of the Harry Potter franchise.

== Plot ==
Mandy (Ciara O'Hanlon) tells the story of her friend Billy Owens (Dalton Mugridge), an average boy who has just turned 11. She notes the strangeness of him being born at the stroke of 11 on November 11, which is later discovered to be a number of great power. Billy, along with Mandy and their cowardly but loyal best friend Devon (Christopher Fazio) discover that Billy's family has magical origins, and upon a chance encounter with a mysterious shopkeeper (Roddy Piper) who Billy buys a wand from for $11, they find out that he can use the wand to cast magic spells, and together they embark on a journey to save their town of Spirit River from a foretold prophecy and prevent the resurrection of a dragon under the influence of the ancient Viking trickster god Loki.

== Cast ==
- Dalton Mugridge - Willard "Billy" Owens
- Ciara O'Hanlon - Amanda "Mandy" Finch
- Christopher Fazio - Devon Turner
- Jennifer Pearson - Katherine Owens
- Jenny Elliott - Principal Gwendolyn Cups
- Jordan Goulet - Kurt Nemees
- Roddy Piper - William Thurgood
- Paul Germs - Victor Mould
- Bob Mugridge - William Owens

== Critical reception ==
The film was panned by several critics. DVD Verdict said about the movie "Nothing about this film is the least bit coherent. Nothing. Zero. Zip. Nada. Zilch," and went on to compare the movie's plot line to that of the Harry Potter franchise. Common Sense Media gave it one out of five stars, saying "At the end of the day, this is a poorly filmed, poorly executed attempt to get on board the Harry Potter train". The film was panned by both critics for both its poor quality and rushed nature.
