= Billy Owens and the Secret of the Runes =

- Directed by: Mark McNabb
- Written by: Barry Cowan
- Produced by: Kelly Irwin; Scott J. Jones; Mark McNabb
- Starring: Roddy Piper; Dalton Mugridge; Christopher Fazio
- Music by: Iain Kelso
- Production company: Skylight Films
- Distributed by: Artistview Entertainment; MTI Home Video
- Release date: May 11, 2010
- Running time: 85 minutes
- Country: Canada
- Language: English

Billy Owens and the Secret of the Runes is a 2010 fantasy film, a sequel to The Mystical Adventures of Billy Owens. The low-budget film was produced as a mockbuster, capitalizing on the success of Harry Potter film series. The film follows the adventures of Billy Owens and his friends Mandy and Devon as they attempt to save the town of Spirit River from the curse of the Norse god Loki.

== Plot ==
Billy, joined by his friends Mandy, Devon, and Danny, continue their adventure from the previous movie. With the help of their magical professor, Mr. Thurgood, the children are still learning about their new powers. When the carnival comes to town, it's revealed that Professor Mould has used the children to trap the soul of Mr. Thurgood in a magical amulet. As the legend goes, inserting the amulet into the scepter will result in the unlocking of the magical powers of the scepter, and release the treasure of the god Loki.

Billy and his friends set out on a journey through dark caves and enchanted forests as they attempt to solve the riddle of the ancient runes and find the scepter while being pursued by Professor Mould and his sidekick, Kurt Nemees.

== Cast ==
- Dalton Mugridge as Billy Owens
- Christopher Fazio as Devon
- Ciara O'Hanlon as Mandy
- Roddy Piper as Mr. Thurgood
- Jordan Goulet as Kurt Nemees
- Paul Germs as Professor Mould

== Release & critical reception ==
The movie was released via DVD on May 11, 2010 by MTI Home Video and Artistview Entertainment.

The film received mainly negative reviews. Rotten Tomatoes gave it an aggregate score of 0% based on 15 user reviews. DVD Verdict said of the movie: "It's a step up from the first entry" (referring to The Mystical Adventures of Billy Owens), but went on to say "It's worse than only 99 percent instead of 99.9 percent of all other films that get distributed". MatchFlick's Mike Thomas gave the movie 0 out of 5 stars, saying of the movie "(it's) an obvious Harry Potter rip-off".
