= All Jokes Aside (film) =

- DVD cover
- Directed by: Harell Smith
- Produced by: Otis Edwards
- Starring: Jamie Foxx; Cedric the Entertainer; Eddie Griffin
- Distributed by: MTI Home Video
- Release date: 2000
- Running time: 76 minutes
- Language: English

All Jokes Aside is a 2000 documentary about black comedians performing in the comedy club All Jokes Aside.
