= Chris Whaley =

American author, pastor and professional wrestler

Chris Whaley (born August 7, 1954) is an American author, Southern Baptist pastor and former professional wrestler who competed in Florida using the ring name The Saint. His novel The Masked Saint was turned into a movie in 2016. He grew up in Auburndale, Florida and graduated from Auburndale High School in 1972.

The Masked Saint won Best Picture at the 2015 International Christian Film & Music Festival.

== Wrestling ==
Whaley was trained by The Great Malenko. In the 1980s Whaley wrestled professionally in Florida and the southeastern states for ten years, competing with The Undertaker among others. His last three years he wrestled in Texas with Wild West Wrestling, WCCW and independent shows.

== Pastor ==
Whaley graduated from Palm Beach Atlantic University. Whaley quit professional wrestling and in 1988 studied theology at Southwestern Baptist Theological Seminary. By 2000, he had become senior pastor at First Baptist Church in Longwood, Florida. Drawing on real-life experiences from both wrestling and his career as a pastor, he wrote the novel The Masked Saint which was published by Morgan James Publishing. In 2013, a movie based on the book was filmed in Sault Ste. Marie. The movie was released by Freestyle on January 8, 2016, in the US and on January 22, 2016, in Canada.

His initial church was Westside Baptist Church in Lake Wales, Florida. He led First Baptist Church in Beverly Hills, Florida from 1990 to 2000. His final church tenure was at First Baptist Church in Longwood, Florida from 2000 to 2013. He currently serves on staff at First Baptist Church of Orlando as the Legacy Adult Pastor.
