= All Jokes Aside (comedy club) =

Past comedy club in Chicago

All Jokes Aside was a comedy club in south-side Chicago which catered almost exclusively to the African-American sector. It opened in 1992 with 275 seats, and ran for "less than a decade". The club's success led to a Comedy Central series as well as a second location in Detroit. In 1994 the company had a turnover of $470,000.

== Notable Performers ==
- Bill Bellamy
- Cedric the Entertainer
- Earthquake
- Mike Epps
- Jamie Foxx
- Adele Givens
- Donald Glover
- Godfrey
- Eddie Griffin
- Kevin Hart
- Steve Harvey
- D.L. Hughley
- Martin Lawrence
- Ali LeRoi
- Luenell
- Bernie Mac
- Henry Spoon
- Carlos Mencia
- Mo'Nique
- Charlie Murphy
- Patrice O'Neal
- Chris Rock
- Craig Robinson
- Sherri Shepherd
- J. B. Smoove
- Robert L. Hines
- Sommore
- Sheryl Underwood
- Thea Vidale
- Katt Williams

== Documentary ==
A 2010 documentary produced by John Davies and Reid Brody and aired on PBS, called "Phunny Business: A Black Comedy," interviewed many of the performers and the management of the club, and documented the club's demise.
